= 1982 World Snooker Championship =

Professional snooker tournament

1982 Embassy World Snooker Championship
Tournament information
- Dates: 30 April – 16 May 1982
- Venue: Crucible Theatre
- City: Sheffield
- Country: England
- Organisation: WPBSA
- Format: Ranking event
- Total prize fund: £110,000
- Winner's share: £25,000
- Highest break: Willie Thorne (ENG) (143)

Final
- Champion: Alex Higgins (NIR)
- Runner-up: Ray Reardon (WAL)
- Score: 18–15

The 1982 World Snooker Championship (officially the 1982 Embassy World Snooker Championship) was a professional snooker tournament that took place between 30 April and 16 May 1982 at the Crucible Theatre, in Sheffield, England. It was the only event of the 1981–82 snooker season which carried world ranking points. Embassy, a British cigarette company, sponsored the tournament, and the World Professional Billiards and Snooker Association (WPBSA) governed the organisation of the event. It had a prize fund of £110,000, with the winner receiving £25,000.

The defending champion Steve Davis had defeated Doug Mountjoy with a score of 18–12 in the previous year's final. In 1982, Davis lost 1–10 to Tony Knowles in the first round. Alex Higgins won his second world title by defeating Ray Reardon 18–15 in the final. Ten century breaks were made during the tournament, the highest of which was a 143 scored by Willie Thorne.

== Overview ==
The World Snooker Championship is an annual cue sport tournament and is the official world championship of the game of snooker. Snooker was founded in the late 19th century by British Army soldiers stationed in India. The sport was originated by players from the United Kingdom, and later spread to players from Europe and the Commonwealth. In more modern times, the sport has transferred to being played worldwide, specifically in Southeast Asia, such as in China, Thailand and Hong Kong. Joe Davis won the first World Championship, held in 1927 at Camkin's Hall in Birmingham, England. Since 1977, the tournament has been held at the Crucible Theatre in Sheffield.

The 1982 World Championship was promoted by Mike Watterson and governed by the World Professional Billiards and Snooker Association (WPBSA). Thirty-two professional players competed in one-on-one single-elimination matches that were played over several frames. The players were selected for the event using a combination of world snooker rankings and a qualification event. The defending champion was Steve Davis, who defeated Doug Mountjoy 18–12 in the 1981 championship final.

There were 67 entrants for the 1982 tournament including the qualifying event, a new record. This was the first world championship to have 32 players in the first round. In 1980, the number of players in the main event had been increased to 24, up from 16 in 1979. In 1980 and 1981, the top eight players received a bye into the second round. It was the only event of the season that carried ranking points. These were only awarded from the last-16 round onwards. British cigarette company Embassy sponsored the tournament.

=== Prize fund ===
The breakdown of prize money on offer for 1982 is shown below. The total of £110,000 was a new record for the world championship.

- Winner: £25,000
- Runner-up: £12,500
- Semi-final: £7,000
- Quarter-final: £3,500
- Last 16: £2,250
- Last 32: £1,250
- Highest break: £2,500
- Maximum break: £10,000
- Total: £110,000

== Tournament summary ==
=== First round ===
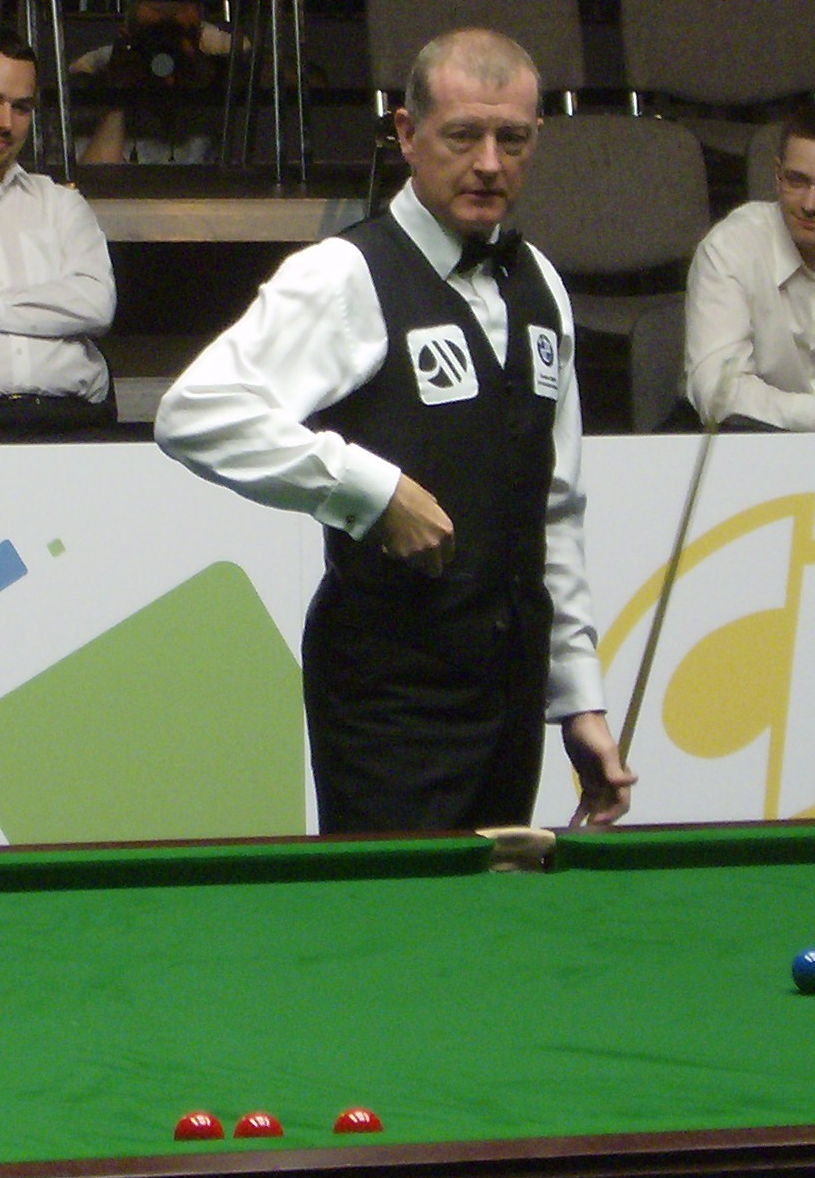
Defending champion Steve Davis (pictured in 2007) lost in the first round 1–10 to Tony Knowles.

The contest's first round took place between 30 April and 6 May, each best-of-19 frames match being played over two sessions. Defending champion Steve Davis was the bookmakers' favourite to win the tournament, with odds of 2/5. However, he lost his opening match 1–10 to Tony Knowles, who won the first and second frames after Davis twice failed to pot the final black ball. Knowles won the next two frames by more than 60 points, giving him a 4–0 lead during the mid-session interval. Without making a significant break, Davis won the fifth frame. Knowles then compiled a break of 67, the highest of the session, to win the sixth frame. Davis's highest break of the first session was 32, and he finished 1–8 behind. In the first frame of the second session, Davis made a foul shot by accidentally lightly feathering the cue ball while preparing to play a shot. Knowles won the frame. In the eleventh frame, Knowles took a 53–0 lead before Davis failed to pot the black ball after the last red ball, and Knowles won the frame and match. Knowles said he had been at a nightclub until 2:00 am that day and had slept for only five hours.

Graham Miles, who was tied at 5–5 with Dave Martin, won the next five frames to achieve a 10–5 victory. Bill Werbeniuk led John Bear 7–2 after their first session; Bear won the next three frames to reduce the lead to 7–5, but Werbeniuk ultimately won 10–7. Cliff Wilson led Eddie Charlton 5–4 but lost the match 5–10. Wilson, who had been taking medication for a viral infection prior to the first round, was feeling unwell and lost six consecutive frames in the second session. Dennis Taylor had lost one of his contact lenses the previous week and played without eyewear. He trailed Silvino Francisco 2–7 but won five of the next six, bringing the score to 7–8. Francisco then won three successive frames, winning 10–7.

Eight-time champion Fred Davis, the event's oldest competitor at the age of 68, lost 7–10 to Dean Reynolds, who at 19 was the youngest participant. After defeat in the first three frames, Davis had led 6–5. Ray Reardon faced Jim Donnelly, the first Scottish player to play at the Crucible, and built a 6–3 lead over him. Reardon lost the subsequent two frames but achieved victory in the next four, allowing him to win 10–5. John Virgo defeated Mike Hallett 10–4 after leading 7–2 in the first session. Terry Griffiths, the bookmakers' next favourite after Steve Davis's elimination, led 4–2 but finished his first session behind 4–5 to Willie Thorne, who had never won a match in his six earlier Crucible appearances. Thorne defeated Griffiths 10–6 and compiled a break of 106, which was the first century break of the 1982 tournament. John Spencer defeated John Dunning 10–4. Alex Higgins, who had said he was having the "worst season of his professional career", became the next bookmakers' favourite. He won his opening-round match against Jim Meadowcroft 10–5. Doug Mountjoy defeated Rex Williams, the reigning world billiards champion, 10–3.

David Taylor led Patsy Fagan 6–3 overnight then extended his lead to 7–3 before Fagan levelled at 7–7. Taylor asked Fagan, who was 7–8 behind, to play again after making a foul shot while failing to escape from a snooker. He failed to pot the green ball and hit the cue ball again as it was still moving, disturbing other balls from their position. The referee could have interpreted this as Fagan conceding the frame but instead replaced the balls. Fagan went on to win the frame. From 9–9, Fagan made the highest break of their match, 78, to win the deciding frame. Perrie Mans won 10–8 over Tony Meo, his first win at the Crucible since the 1978 semi-final. Jimmy White, who started his match against Cliff Thorburn with a break of 102 in the first frame, led 7–2 in the first session and won the match 10–4. Kirk Stevens defeated Jack Fitzmaurice 10–4. In the first round, five of the top eight seeds were eliminated: Steve Davis (seeded 1), Thorburn (2), Griffiths (3), Dennis Taylor (5), and David Taylor (7). This included the previous three world champions, who were also the top three seeds.

=== Second round ===
The second round took place between 5 and 10 May; each match was played over three sessions as the best-of-25 frames. Knowles defeated Miles 13–7. Charlton led Werbeniuk 6–1 and 11–4, and won 13–5. Francisco won the first four frames of his match against Reynolds to lead 4–0 and led at 5–3 and 9–5 before winning 13–8. Reardon was 6–2 and later 10–6 against Virgo, winning 13–8.

Thorne, after being 5–3 ahead of Spencer after the first session, made a break of 122 during the second and went on to win the match 13–5. Higgins won the first three frames of his match against Mountjoy, two of them on the final black ball after trailing on points in each of them, and finished their first session leading 6–2. Higgins moved to 9–7 ahead and Mountjoy then won three consecutive frames. Higgins then won the next three for 12–10. Mountjoy forced a deciding frame by winning the next two and was nearly 40 points ahead in the decider, but Higgins won the frame to win the match 13–12. Stevens defeated Fagan 13–7, having led 10–6 at the end of their second session. White led Mans 5–3 before winning 13–6.

=== Quarter-finals ===
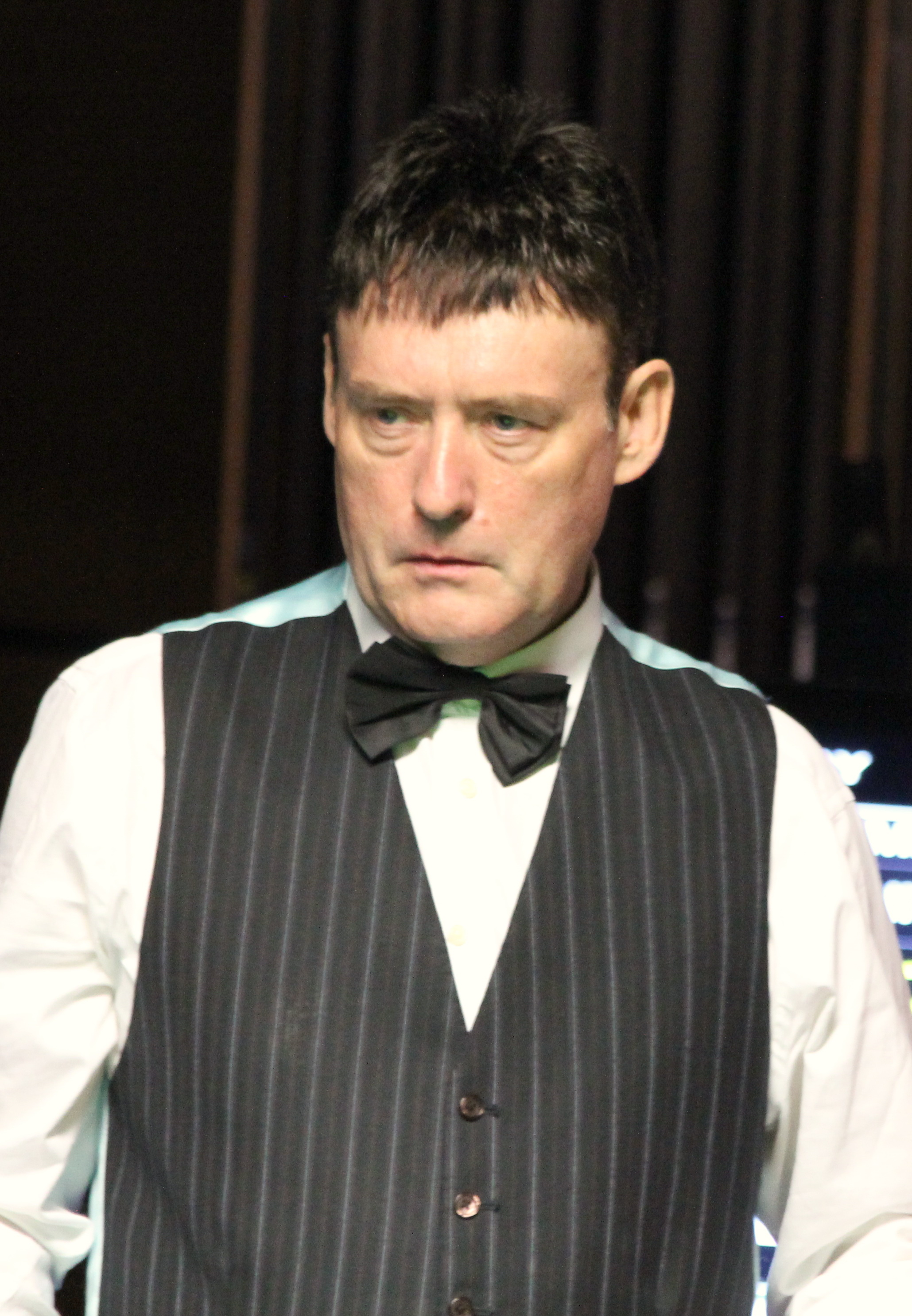
Jimmy White (pictured in 2016) was the only non-seeded player to reach the semi-finals, defeating Kirk Stevens 13–9.

The quarter-finals took place from 9 to 11 May; each match was played over three sessions as the best-of-25 frames. White led Stevens 5–3 in their first session, extending this to 10–6, and winning the match 13–9. Reardon led Francisco 6–2 and 10–6 after their sessions, and won 13–8. Thorne was 3–5 behind Higgins; despite scoring breaks of 143 – the highest of the tournament – in the 9th frame, and 112 in the 16th frame, he still trailed 7–9 at the end of the second session. Higgins won the match 13–10, compiling a 68 break in the last frame.

Knowles led Charlton 5–3 after their first session and 10–6 after the second. Knowles then won the first frame of the third session to lead 11–6. Charlton narrowed the lead to 9–11 and won another frame to score 10–11 when Knowles missed a routine green ball. Knowles missed a black ball from its spot in the 22nd frame, saying he was distracted by a member of the audience rustling paper. Charlton then made a break of 78 to level the match 11–11. Charlton took the following frame as well, then won the match 13–11 with a break of 58, concluding a seven-frame winning streak.

=== Semi-finals ===
The semi-finals took place from 12 to 14 May, with both matches played over four sessions as the best-of-31 frames. White, by defeating Stevens in the quarter-finals, had become the youngest-ever player to reach a world championship semi-final aged 20 years. Higgins, his opponent, won the opening frame of the match. White made breaks of 60 and 38, and won the second frame, before Higgins built a 4–1 lead. With breaks of 63, 69 and 44, White drew level at 4–4 by the end of the first session. White won the first four frames of the second session, compiling breaks of 69 in the first and 52 in the second. Higgins had a chance in the second frame but failed to pot the last red ball and conceded the frame. After the mid-session interval, Higgins made a break of 61 and won the 13th frame, and also took the 14th frame after White missed an easy black. After White missed a red ball, Higgins also won the next frame, ending the day one frame behind at 7–8. In the third session, White took three of the first four frames, compiling a break of 89 in the fourth of these to lead 11–8, Higgins then won the next three to level the match at 11–11 by the end of the session.

White won the first frame of the fourth session and Higgins fluked a brown in the following frame, which he went on to win. From 12–12, the next two frames were shared for 13–13. Higgins scored only nine points across two frames as White moved into a 15–13 lead with three frames to play. Higgins narrowed his deficit to one frame with a break of 72. In the 30th frame, White was 59 points ahead when he missed a mid distance red with the rest. Higgins then made a break of 69, showing excellent potting but poor positional play that is described in the book Masters of the Baize (2005) as "arguably the greatest clearance of all time" to take the match to a deciding frame. In the last frame, Higgins made a break of 59 to win the match 16–15.

Charlton gained a 3–0 lead over Reardon. Reardon, however, made breaks of 50, 47, 48 and 35 in the next four frames and finished the first session 4–3 ahead. Charlton scored a break of 83 in the first frame of the second session, levelling the score at 4–4. Reardon again moved a frame ahead with a break of 98. Charlton gained a two-frame lead at 7–5 by winning three consecutive frames but lost the 13th frame after snookering himself on the yellow ball. Reardon then equalised the match at 7–7, scoring a break of 59 in the last frame of the session. In the third session, the score went to 8–8 and Reardon then compiled breaks of 94 and 77 to win the next two frames. Charlton again equalised with a 54 break in the 17th frame and by winning the 18th frame on the pink. Reardon took the lead with a 93 clearance at 11–10 but Charlton won the last frame of the session with a break of 64 that started with a fluke. In the fourth session, Reardon had won five successive frames to win the match 16–11, making a 98 break in the fourth frame.

=== Final ===
The final between Reardon and Higgins was played on 15 and 16 May as the best-of-35 frames over four sessions. Reardon, a six-time champion, had never lost in the world championship final. It was Higgins's fourth world final following his win in 1972 and his losing appearances in the 1976 and 1980 finals. The 1982 final was a rematch of the 1976 final, which Reardon won 27–16. In the opening session, in which both players made a number of errors, Reardon built a 5–3 lead. Higgins had compiled a break of 118 in the fourth frame to equalise at 2–2. In the second session, Reardon was 6–4 ahead when he failed to pot the pink ball; Higgins won that frame and the next to equalise at 6–6. Reardon won the next frame but Higgins took the lead at 8–7, the first day finishing with Higgins 10–7 up.

On the second day, Reardon won the first frame with a break of 95 and also won the next frame. Higgins won the next two frames to gain a 12–9 lead, which Reardon reduced by winning frames 22 and 23, the session ending with Higgins leading 13–12. In the fourth and final session, Higgins won the first frame and took the second after Reardon missed an easy yellow. Now 15–12 ahead, Higgins missed a pot that allowed Reardon to win the frame and narrow Higgins's lead to two frames, 15–13. With Higgins showing signs of nervousness, Reardon won another two frames to level at 15–15, having required Higgins to concede points from a foul in the second of these. Higgins then won the 31st frame 79–0, the 32nd 112–0 with breaks of 38 and 73, and then won the match with a clearance of 135. A tearful Higgins summoned his wife and baby daughter from the audience to celebrate with him. The tournament was broadcast on BBC2, with 10.8 million viewers on the second day of the final.

Higgins had two ranking points deducted for misconduct in February 1981, which meant that he was second behind Reardon rather than first in the snooker world rankings 1982/1983 after his championship win. Before the tournament, Reardon was ranked fourth and Higgins was eleventh. Thorburn and Steve Davis dropped from first and second to third and fourth respectively. Griffiths, who had been third, dropped to 14th. The day after his 1982 Championship win, he attended a WPBSA disciplinary meeting, which considered incidents including Higgins urinating in a flower display at the Crucible during the event, and an incident at the 1982 Irish Masters where he had told audience members to "shut your traps". The Association fined him £1,000 for bringing the game into disrepute.

== Main draw ==
Shown below are the results for each round. The numbers in brackets are player seeds, whilst those in bold denote match winners.

**First round** Best of 19 frames
30 April & 1 May
Steve Davis (ENG) (1)	1
**Tony Knowles (ENG)**	**10**
30 April & 1 May
**Graham Miles (ENG) (16)**	**10**
Dave Martin (ENG)	5
1 & 2 May
**Bill Werbeniuk (CAN) (9)**	**10**
John Bear (CAN)	7
1 & 2 May
**Eddie Charlton (AUS) (8)**	**10**
Cliff Wilson (WAL)	5
1 & 2 May
Dennis Taylor (NIR) (5)	7
**Silvino Francisco (RSA)**	**10**
1 & 2 May
Fred Davis (ENG) (12)	7
**Dean Reynolds (ENG)**	**10**
2 & 3 May
**John Virgo (ENG) (13)**	**10**
Mike Hallett (ENG)	4
2 & 3 May
**Ray Reardon (WAL) (4)**	**10**
Jim Donnelly (SCO)	5
3 & 4 May
Terry Griffiths (WAL) (3)	6
**Willie Thorne (ENG)**	**10**
3 & 4 May
**John Spencer (ENG) (14)**	**10**
John Dunning (ENG)	4
3 & 4 May
**Alex Higgins (NIR) (11)**	**10**
Jim Meadowcroft (ENG)	5
3 & 4 May
**Doug Mountjoy (WAL) (6)**	**10**
Rex Williams (ENG)	3
4 & 5 May
David Taylor (ENG) (7)	9
**Patsy Fagan (IRL)**	**10**
4 & 5 May
**Kirk Stevens (CAN) (10)**	**10**
Jack Fitzmaurice (ENG)	4
5 & 6 May
**Perrie Mans (RSA) (15)**	**10**
Tony Meo (ENG)	8
5 & 6 May
Cliff Thorburn (CAN) (2)	4
**Jimmy White (ENG)**	**10**

**Second round** Best of 25 frames
5 & 6 May
(England) **Tony Knowles**	**13**
(England) Graham Miles (16)	7
5, 6 & 7 May
(Canada) Bill Werbeniuk (9)	5
(Australia) **Eddie Charlton (8)**	**13**
7 & 8 May
(South Africa) **Silvino Francisco**	**13**
(England) Dean Reynolds	8
6, 7 & 8 May
(England) John Virgo (13)	8
(Wales) **Ray Reardon (4)**	**13**
7 & 8 May
(England) **Willie Thorne**	**13**
(England) John Spencer (14)	5
7, 8 & 9 May
(Northern Ireland) **Alex Higgins (11)**	**13**
(Wales) Doug Mountjoy (6)	12
9 & 10 May
(Republic of Ireland) Patsy Fagan	7
(Canada) **Kirk Stevens (10)**	**13**
8 & 9 May
(South Africa) Perrie Mans (15)	6
(England) **Jimmy White**	**13**

**Quarter-finals**; Best of 25 frames
9, 10 & 11 May
(England) Tony Knowles	11
(Australia) **Eddie Charlton (8)**	**13**
10 & 11 May
(South Africa) Silvino Francisco	8
(Wales) **Ray Reardon (4)**	**13**
10 & 11 May
(England) Willie Thorne	10
(Northern Ireland) **Alex Higgins (11)**	**13**
10 & 11 May
(Canada) Kirk Stevens (10)	9
(England) **Jimmy White**	**13**

**Semi-finals**; Best of 31 frames
12, 13 & 14 May
(Australia) Eddie Charlton (8)	11
(Wales) **Ray Reardon (4)**	**16**
12, 13 & 14 May
(Northern Ireland) **Alex Higgins (11)**	**16**
(England) Jimmy White	15

**Final**; Best of 35 frames
15 & 16 May
(Wales) Ray Reardon (4)	15
(Northern Ireland) **Alex Higgins (11)**	**18**

Final: (Best of 35 frames) Crucible Theatre, Sheffield, 15 & 16 May 1982. Referee: John Smyth.
Ray Reardon (4) (Wales)				15–**18**			**Alex Higgins (11)** (Northern Ireland)			
Session 1: 5–3
Frame	1	2	3	4	5	6	7	8	9	10
Reardon	41	**64**^{†}	**84**^{†} (64)	0	**64**^{†}	**77**^{†}	**65**^{†}	28	N/A	N/A
Higgins	**61**^{†}	31	47	**121**^{†} (118)	53	30	55	**87**^{†}	N/A	N/A
Session 2: 7–10
Frame	1	2	3	4	5	6	7	8	9	10
Reardon	8	**76**^{†}	47	22	**69**^{†}	4	36	14	13	N/A
Higgins	**89**^{†}	8	**56**^{†}	**91**^{†} (51)	29	**96**^{†} (66)	**71**^{†} (58)	**94**^{†}	**73**^{†}	N/A
Session 3: 12–13
Frame	1	2	3	4	5	6	7	8	9	10
Reardon	**122**^{†} (95)	**81**^{†}	38	31	**69**^{†}	**79**^{†}	31	**52**^{†}	N/A	N/A
Higgins	22	13	**77**^{†}	**78**^{†}	40	36	**71**^{†}	37	N/A	N/A
Session 4: 15–**18**
Frame	1	2	3	4	5	6	7	8	9	10
Reardon	14	61 (54)	**84**^{†} (53)	**69**^{†}	**60**^{†}	0	9	0	N/A	N/A
Higgins	**115**^{†}	**70**^{†}	49	36	58	**79**^{†}	**112**^{†} (73)	**139**^{†} (135)	N/A	N/A
95				Highest break			135			
0				Century breaks			2			
4				50+ breaks			6			
Numbers in parentheses indicate breaks of 50 or more. † = Winner of frame

== Qualifying ==
Qualifying matches took place in April 1982 at Redwood Lodge Country Club, Bristol; Romiley Forum, Stockport; Astra La Reserve Club, Sutton Coldfield; and Sheffield Snooker Centre. Qualifying matches were played over two rounds as the best-of-17 frames. The results are shown below. Players in bold denote match winners. Former world champion John Pulman withdrew from the competition because he had not sufficiently recovered after sustaining a broken leg in October 1981.

**First qualifying round** Best-of-17 frames
**Eugene Hughes (IRL)**	**w.o.**
Derek Mienie (RSA)	w.d.
**Pat Houlihan (ENG)**	**9**
Ian Anderson (AUS)	5
**John Bear (CAN)**	**9**
Frank Jonik (CAN)	4
**Paul Medati (ENG)**	**9**
John Phillips (SCO)	3
**Silvino Francisco (RSA)**	**9**
Chris Ross (SCO)	0
**Paddy Morgan (AUS)**	**9**
David Greaves (ENG)	2
**Dean Reynolds (ENG)**	**9**
Dessie Sheehan (IRL)	5
**Joe Johnson (ENG)**	**9**
Vic Harris (ENG)	4
**Jim Donnelly (SCO)**	**9**
Matt Gibson (SCO)	8
**Eddie Sinclair (SCO)**	**9**
Billy Kelly (IRL)	8
**Colin Roscoe (WAL)**	**9**
Bernie Mikkelsen (CAN)	6
**Murdo Macleod (SCO)**	**9**
Eddie McLaughlin (SCO)	8
**Mike Watterson (ENG)**	**9**
Bert Demarco (SCO)	6
**Ian Black (SCO)**	**9**
Maurice Parkin (ENG)	6
**Doug French (ENG)**	**9**
Bernard Bennett (ENG)	3
**Jack Fitzmaurice (ENG)**	**w.o.**
John Pulman (ENG)	w.d.
**Mario Morra (CAN)**	**9**
Tommy Murphy (NIR)	5
**Dennis Hughes (ENG)**	**9**
Clive Everton (WAL)	4
**Mark Wildman (ENG)**	**9**
Geoff Foulds (ENG)	8

**Second qualifying round** Best-of-17 frames
**Tony Knowles (ENG)**	**9**
Eugene Hughes (IRL)	7
**Dave Martin (ENG)**	**9**
Pat Houlihan (ENG)	3
Jim Wych (CAN)	4
**John Bear (CAN)**	**9**
**Cliff Wilson (WAL)**	**9**
Paul Medati (ENG)	5
**Silvino Francisco (RSA)**	**9**
Paddy Morgan (AUS)	1
Ray Edmonds (ENG)	6
**Dean Reynolds (ENG)**	**9**
**Mike Hallett (ENG)**	**9**
Joe Johnson (ENG)	8
**Jim Donnelly (SCO)**	**9**
Eddie Sinclair (SCO)	8
**Willie Thorne (ENG)**	**9**
Colin Roscoe (WAL)	1
**John Dunning (ENG)**	**9**
Murdo Macleod (SCO)	4
**Jim Meadowcroft (ENG)**	**9**
Mike Watterson (ENG)	7
**Rex Williams (ENG)**	**9**
Ian Black (SCO)	2
**Patsy Fagan (IRL)**	**9**
Doug French (ENG)	6
**Jack Fitzmaurice (ENG)**	**9**
Mario Morra (CAN)	7
**Tony Meo (ENG)**	**9**
Dennis Hughes (ENG)	4
**Jimmy White (ENG)**	**9**
Mark Wildman (ENG)	4

== Century breaks ==
There were 10 century breaks at the championship, the highest being 143 by Willie Thorne. On offer was a £5,000 bonus for compiling a break higher than the championship record of 145.

- 143, 122, 112, 106 – Willie Thorne
- 135, 118 – Alex Higgins
- 126, 102 – Jimmy White
- 111 – Kirk Stevens
- 100 – John Virgo

Three century breaks were made in the qualifying competition.

- 127 – Dave Martin
- 107 – Mike Watterson
- 100 – Mike Hallett
