= Clive Everton =

English sports commentator (1937–2024)

Clive Everton MBE

Personal information
- Born: 7 September 1937 Worcester, England
- Died: 27 September 2024 (aged 87) West Midlands, England

Sport
- Sport: Snooker
- Professional: 1981–1991
- Highest ranking: 47 (1983–84)
- Best ranking finish: Last 32 (×1)

Clive Harold Everton (7 September 1937 – 27 September 2024) was an English sports commentator, journalist, author and professional billiards and snooker player. He founded Snooker Scene magazine, which was first published (as World Snooker) in 1971, and continued as editor until September 2022. He authored over twenty books about cue sports from 1972 onwards.

Everton began commentating on snooker for BBC radio in 1972 and for BBC Television from 1978 until 2010. In the snooker boom years of the 1980s, he commentated alongside Ted Lowe and Jack Karnehm, and became the leading commentator in the 1990s. As an amateur player, he won junior titles in English billiards and the Welsh billiards title several times. He was five-times runner up in the English amateur billiards championship and twice a semi-finalist at the world amateur championship. In snooker, he partnered Roger Bales as they won the United Kingdom National Pairs Championship. Everton turned professional in 1981, achieving a highest ranking of 47th in the world in ten years as a snooker professional. He reached a peak of ninth place in the professional billiards rankings and remained in the top 20 ranked players even into his sixties.

Everton played county-level tennis for Worcestershire for 13 years and was once the agent of Jonah Barrington, the former world number one squash player. In 2017, he was inducted into the Snooker Hall of Fame and was appointed Member of the Order of the British Empire (MBE) in the 2019 Birthday Honours for services to snooker. In 2022 the British Open tournament trophy was renamed the "Clive Everton Trophy".

== Early life ==
Clive Harold Everton was born in Worcester on 7 September 1937. He was educated at King's School, Worcester, City of Birmingham College of Commerce, and later at Cardiff University, where he obtained a B.A. in English. After graduating, he taught English and Liberal Studies at Halesowen College of Further Education, before a career change into freelance journalism.

== Cue sports career ==
Everton became interested in playing English billiards after his father took him to a match at Leicester Square Hall where Sidney Smith was playing. He started playing on a friend's quarter-size billiard table, before having his own bought for him, and then began to play on a full-size table several months later. He entered the British Boys (under-16) English billiards Championship for the first time in 1951, when he was 14, and lost in the first round to Brian Brooking by 147 points to 201. He won the 1953 under-16 billiards championship by defeating John Lambert by 401–197 in the final. The following year, he was runner-up in the under-19 Championship, losing 360–538 to Donald Scott. He reached the under-19 final again in 1956, and claimed the title with a 429–277 victory against Granville Hampson. He took the Welsh Amateur billiards championship title in 1960, 1972, 1973 and 1976, and was five times runner-up in the English Amateur billiards championship between 1967 and 1980.

He reached both the 1975 and 1977 world amateur billiards semi-finals, and won the 1980 Canadian Open, making a break of 141 after trailing Steve Davis 195–400 in the 500-up final. During the 1977 world championship he experienced a back injury which eventually required discs in his spine to be fused, and Everton felt that his game never quite recovered. Despite this he would reach a high ranking in the professional billiards game of ninth and remained in the top-20 ranked players even into his sixties. At the 2005 World Billiards championship he was one of 17 participants, and lost all three of his qualifying group matches. He resigned his membership of the WPBSA in April 2006 during a dispute with the Association, which was seeking to take action against him through the Sports Dispute Resolution Panel as a result of criticism of it that he had published in Snooker Scene. Re-instated as an amateur, he won the Midlands amateur billiards title for the 14th time in 2008, having first taken the title in 1962.

In snooker, he reached the southern area final of the 1977 English Amateur Championship where he lost 1–8 to Terry Griffiths. A couple of months later, Everton and his playing partner Roger Bales won the 1977 National (UK) Pairs Championship after a 3–0 victory against Dickie Laws and John Pike in the final. He was accepted by the World Professional Billiards and Snooker Association (WPBSA) as a professional in 1981. In his professional debut, at the qualifying tournament for the 1981 International Open, he won his first match 5–4 against Kingsley Kennerley. In Everton's second match, Mike Watterson, who was also the tournament promoter, arrived 15 minutes late after not realising that the official start time was thirty minutes earlier than on publicity and tickets for the event, and therefore conceded a frame to Everton as per the tournament rules. Watterson won the match 5–4.

Everton's most notable win as a professional snooker player was a 5–2 defeat of Patsy Fagan in the last 64 of the 1982 Professional Players Tournament, representing the furthest that he ever reached in a major tournament. He lost to Cliff Thorburn by the same score in the last 32. He played in the Welsh Professional Championship on seven occasions, being seeded to the quarter-finals on four of these and the first round three times, but never won a match in the competition. His last match in professional snooker before retiring from competition was a 3–5 defeat by Mark Wildman at the 1991 British Open. He achieved a highest ranking of 47th in the world in ten years as a snooker professional.

== Writing and television ==
After leaving Halesowen College, Everton worked as a freelance sports reporter, covering sports including hockey, tennis, badminton and squash for Birmingham Post, Birmingham Evening Mail, The Guardian, The Sunday Telegraph and other publications. He also commentated on snooker for BBC radio from 1972, and BBC television from the 1978 World Snooker Championship.

He was the editor of the magazine Billiards and Snooker, owned by the Billiards Association and Control Council, from the December 1966 issue until the February 1971 issue. According to Everton, he was sacked at the instigation of Jack Karnehm, the Chairman of the Billiards and Snooker Control Council (as the Billiards Association and Control Council had renamed itself) for "giving professionals publicity". In Everton's account, this followed him including pictures of four professional players on the cover of Billiards and Snooker at a time when the Billiards and Snooker Control Council and the professional players were in dispute over the World Billiards Championship. This dispute led to the Professional Billiards Players Association renaming itself as the WPBSA and splitting from the Billiards and Snooker Control Council (B&SCC). Following his sacking, Everton established his own magazine, World Snooker.

In 1972, the B&SCC approached Everton to take over Billiards and Snooker and paid him £1,000 to do so. Everton merged Billiards and Snooker and World Snooker into Snooker Scene, which published its first issue in April 1972. Snooker Scene has sometimes featured criticisms of the WPBSA which have led to legal disputes. Everton said of Snooker Scene: "I had started this as a simple journal of record of what was happening on the table, but it became a crusading vehicle ... Taking Wisden and Private Eye as our models we sometimes made our point through hard reporting, sometimes through satire."

Everton authored over twenty books about cue sports. As a snooker commentator, during the hey-day of the game in the 1980s, he worked alongside Ted Lowe and Karnehm, and became the leading commentator in the 1990s. In September 2007 he published Black Farce and Cueball Wizards: The Inside Story of the Snooker World, which has a history of snooker as well as being autobiographical. The Independent on Sunday praised the book at "Revelatory stuff, masterfully written." Nick Harris of The Independent, noting that Everton was a correspondent for the publication's Sunday sister publication but saying that "nepotism is not required to recommend this book", wrote that it was a "terrific memoir-cum-history of the game." A review for his 2013 book A History of Billiards in The Independent on Sunday stated that "his affection for and encyclopaedic knowledge of the three-ball game shines through"

In 2009, it was announced that Everton would effectively lose his position as the BBC's primary snooker commentator; he did not commentate on the Masters, and only commentated on the World Championship until the quarter-final stages. This was variously attributed to his criticism of the game's governing body, World Snooker, his age and old-fashioned style, and his lack of fame relative to the former players on the BBC's commentary roster. Everton commented, "I'm hurt and angry, because I find the reasons presented to me incomprehensible."

During the 2009–10 season, Everton's role at the BBC was reduced still further. He only commentated on two matches during the Grand Prix, and was not heard at all during the Masters. He commentated on days one to four of the 2010 World Snooker Championship and was heard again on day six, but that was his final commentary work of the tournament. According to Everton, the understanding for the 2010–11 season was that he would commentate if Steve Davis and Ken Doherty were not available due to them still participating in particular tournaments. Everton said that he was offered four days' work at the 2011 World Snooker Championship, but that this was rescinded when Stephen Hendry was eliminated from the competition and became available for commentary. Everton was later told that his work for the following season would depend on Hendry's availability, and decided that this was the end of his relationship with the BBC. After his departure from the BBC, Everton continued commentating for ITV until the Champion of Champions tournament in November 2019.

In the September 2022 issue of Snooker Scene, Everton announced that he would not be continuing as editor. From November 2022, Snooker Scene was revived under the ownership of Curtis Sport. Everton continued to work for the magazine as an editorial consultant, also contributing feature articles and reports on billiards events.

== Personal life, illness and death ==
Everton married Valerie (née Teasdale) in 1961 and they had four daughters and a son.

Everton played county-level tennis for Worcestershire for 13 years, and managed Jonah Barrington, the former world number one squash player. In 2017, he was inducted into the Snooker Hall of Fame at the annual Snooker Awards. He was appointed Member of the Order of the British Empire (MBE) in the 2019 Birthday Honours for services to snooker.

In later life, Everton suffered from Parkinson's disease. He died on 27 September 2024, aged 87, following a long period of ill health.

== Snooker performance and rankings timeline ==
Tournament	1979/ 80	1980/ 81	1981/ 82	1982/ 83	1983/ 84	1984/ 85	1985/ 86	1986/ 87	1987/ 88	1988/ 89	1989/ 90	1990/ 91	Ref.
Ranking	(Note: He was an amateur.)			(Note: New players on the Main Tour do not have a ranking.)	47	60	73	100	112	120	132	134	
Ranking tournaments
Grand Prix (Note: The event was also called the Professional Players Tournament (1982/93–1983/1984))	Not held			2R	1R	1R	LQ	LQ	LQ	LQ	A	A	
Dubai Classic	Tournament not held									NR	LQ	A	
UK Championship	Non-ranking event					LQ	LQ	LQ	LQ	LQ	A	A	
Classic	Non-ranking event				LQ	LQ	LQ	LQ	LQ	LQ	A	LQ	
British Open (Note: The event was also called the International Masters (1981/1982–1983/1984))	Non-ranking event					LQ	LQ	WD	WD	LQ	A	LQ	
European Open	Tournament not held									LQ	A	A	
World Championship	A	A	LQ	LQ	LQ	LQ	LQ	LQ	LQ	LQ	LQ	WD	
Non-ranking tournaments
Welsh Professional Championship	A	A	QF	QF	QF	QF	1R	1R	1R	A	A	A	
Former ranking tournaments
International Open (Note: The event was also called the Goya Matchroom Trophy (1985/1986))	Not held		NR	LQ	LQ	LQ	LQ	LQ	LQ	LQ	A	NH	
Canadian Masters (Note: The event was also called the Canadian Open (1978/1979–1980/1981))	NR		Tournament not held				Non-Ranking			LQ	Not held		
Former non-ranking tournaments
Canadian Masters (Note: The event was also called the Canadian Open (1978/1979–1980/1981))	LQ	A	Tournament not held				A	A	A	R	Not held		
International Open (Note: The event was also called the Goya Matchroom Trophy (1985/1986))	Not held		LQ	Ranking event								NH	
Bass & Golden Leisure Classic	Not held		1R	Tournament not held									
UK Championship	A	A	LQ	LQ	LQ	Ranking event							
British Open (Note: The event was also called the International Masters (1981/1982–1983/1984))	A	A	LQ	A	LQ	Ranking event							

Performance Table Legend
LQ	lost in the qualifying draw	#R	lost in the early rounds of the tournament (WR = Wildcard round, RR = Round robin)	QF	lost in the quarter-finals
A	did not participate in the tournament	WD	withdrew from the tournament		

NH / not held	means an event was not held.
NR / Non-ranking event	means an event is/was no longer a ranking event.
R / Ranking event	means an event is/was a ranking event.

== Career finals ==
Career finals (English billiards)
Outcome	Year	Championship	Opponent in the final	Score	Ref.
Winner	1953	British Junior (under 16) Championship	John Lambert	401–197	
Runner-up	1955	British Junior (under 19) Championship	Donald Scott	360–538	
Winner	1956	British Junior (under 19) Championship	Granville Hampson	429–277	
Winner	1960	Welsh Amateur Championship	P. J. Morris		
Runner-up	1967	English Amateur Championship	Leslie Driffield	2,328–3,395	
Runner-up	1968	English Amateur Championship	Mark Wildman	2,540–2,652	
Winner	1972	Welsh Amateur Championship	Roy Oriel	1,028–857	
Winner	1973	Welsh Amateur Championship	J. Terry		
Runner-up	1973	English Amateur Championship	Norman Dagley	1,976–2,804	
Winner	1975	Ironopolis Invitational	Herbert Beetham	829–760	
Winner	1976	Welsh Amateur Championship	Roy Oriel		
Runner-up	1976	English Amateur Championship	Bob Close	2,194–2,413	
Runner-up	1980	English Amateur Championship	Norman Dagley	2,172–2,825	
Winner	1980	Canadian Open	Steve Davis	500–468	

Career finals (snooker)
Outcome	Year	Championship	Opponents in the final	Score	Ref.
Winner	1977	National (UK) Pairs Championship (with Roger Bales)	Dickie Laws and John Pike	3–0	

== Publications ==
Everton authored, or-co-authored, the following books:

- Silverton, John; Everton, Clive (1972). Park Drive Official Snooker And Billiards Year book. Gallagher.
- Barrington, Jonah; Everton, Clive (1972). The Book of Jonah. Stanley Paul. ISBN 0-09-113610-5.
- Everton, Clive (1974). The Ladbroke Snooker International Handbook. Ladbrokes Leisure. ISBN 0-905606-00-0.
- Griffiths, Terry; Everton, Clive (1981). Championship Snooker. Queen Anne P. ISBN 0-362-00543-5.
- Everton, Clive (1982). Guinness Book of Snooker. Guinness World Records Limited. ISBN 0-85112-256-6.
- Everton, Clive, ed. (1984). Snooker Year: First Edition. London: Virgin Books. ISBN 0863690513.
- Everton, Clive (1985). Better Billiards and Snooker. Kaye & Ward. ISBN 0-7182-1480-3.
- Everton, Clive (1985). Snooker: The Records. Guinness World Records Limited. ISBN 0-85112-448-8.
- Everton, Clive, ed. (1985). Snooker Year: Second Edition. Virgin Books. ISBN 0-86369-104-8.
- Everton, Clive (1986). History of Snooker and Billiards. TBS The Book Service. ISBN 1-85225-013-5.
- Everton, Clive, ed. (1986). Snooker Year: Third Edition. Aylesbury: Pelham Books. ISBN 0863691668.
- Thorburn, Cliff; Everton, Clive (1987). Playing for Keeps. West Sussex, UK: Partridge Press. ISBN 1-85225-011-9.
- Everton, Clive (1987). Improve Your Snooker. London: Harper Collins Willow. ISBN 0-00-218255-6.
- Taylor, Dennis; Everton, Clive (1990). Play Snooker. BBC Books. ISBN 0-563-36037-2.
- Everton, Clive (1991). Snooker & Billiards: Technique · Tactics · Training. The Crowood Press. ISBN 1-85223-480-6.
- Spencer, John (1993). Clive, Everton (ed.). Snooker (Teach Yourself). NTC Publication Group. ISBN 0-8442-3940-2.
- Weber, Eugene; Everton, Clive (1993). The Book of Snooker and Billiard Quotations. Hutchinson. ISBN 0-09-177620-1.
- Everton, Clive (1993). The Embassy Book of World Snooker. London: Bloomsbury Publishing. ISBN 0-7475-1610-3.
- Everton, Clive (2007). Black Farce and Cue Ball Wizards: The Inside Story of the Snooker World. Mainstream Publishing. ISBN 978-1-84596-199-2.
- Everton, Clive (2012). A History of Billiards: The English Three-ball Game. englishBilliards.org. ISBN 978-0-9564054-5-6.
- Everton, Clive (2014). Snooker & Billiards. The Crowood Press. ISBN 9781847977922.
- Everton, Clive (2018). Simply the Best: A Biography of Ronnie O'Sullivan. Pitch Publishing. ISBN 978-1785314445.
