= Roger Bales =

English snooker player

Personal information
- Born: 15 August 1948 (age 78)

Sport
- Country: England
- Sport: Snooker
- Professional: 1984–1993
- Highest ranking: 57 (1986–87)
- Best ranking finish: Last 32 (x5)

Roger Bales (born 15 August 1948) is an English former professional snooker player.

== Career ==
Born in Birmingham on 15 August 1948, Bales first played competitive snooker in 1974, playing in that year's Pontin's Spring Open, a pro-am event, where he lost his first match 0–4 to Mario Berni. In the 1978 edition of that event, he whitewashed Cliff Wilson 4–0, but was defeated in the next round 3–4 by Dennis Taylor.

Partnering with Clive Everton, Bales won the national pairs snooker championship in 1977. He won the Pontins Autumn Open in 1983.

Having gained experience in the amateur game, Bales turned professional in 1984, aged 35. At the International Open, his first professional tournament, he defeated Dessie Sheehan, Tommy Murphy, and Mick Fisher to reach the last 48, where he led Dean Reynolds 4–2 but could not prevent Reynolds from coming back to beat him 4–5. Despite winning eight matches in his first professional season, he did not gain any ranking points, and was ranked 100 at the season's end.

In the 1985/1986 season, Bales reached the last 32 in a ranking event for the first time at the 1986 British Open; there, he beat Maurice Parkin 5–1 and Taylor, now the incumbent World Champion, 5–4, to set up a meeting with the veteran Rex Williams. In their match, Bales again led 4–2 but went on to lose 4–5.

Although he began the following season inside the top 64 of the rankings, at 57th, Bales earned only £1,695 in prize money during 1986–87, due to a sole last-32 finish which came at the International Open; he had beaten Fred Davis 5–4 and Kirk Stevens 5–3 to qualify, but was eliminated 1–5 by Wilson.

Over the course of the next five years, Bales' ranking declined steadily as he was able to produce only intermittently good results. He reached the last 32 in three more ranking events - the 1987 Grand Prix, where he lost 2–5 to Willie Thorne, the 1989 British Open, where Mike Hallett whitewashed him 5–0, and the 1989 International Open, where he was beaten 5–1 by Alain Robidoux - but, having begun the 1991–92 season ranked 116th, he finished it, having lost 1–10 to Chris Cookson in qualifying for the 1992 World Championship, without a ranking.

Bales entered ten tournaments during the 1992/1993 season, but won only one match - in the sixth round of qualifying for the International Open. He lost 3–5 to Mark O'Sullivan in the seventh qualifying round for the 1993 World Championship, and did not play competitive snooker thereafter.
