= 1987 Grand Prix =

1987 Grand Prix may refer to:

- 1987 Grand Prix (snooker)
- 1987 Grand Prix (tennis)
