= Singapore Masters (snooker) =

Tournament information
- Country: Singapore
- Established: 1984
- Organisation(s): WPBSA
- Format: Invitational event
- Final year: 1985
- Final champion: (England) Steve Davis

The Singapore Masters was a professional invitational snooker tournament held for two editions in Singapore. Sponsored by Camus, both tournaments were won by Terry Griffiths and Steve Davis respectively.

== Winners ==
| Year | Winner | Runner-up | Final score | Season |
|---|---|---|---|---|
| 1984 | (Wales) Terry Griffiths | (England) Steve Davis | Round-Robin | 1984/85 |
| 1985 | (England) Steve Davis | (Wales) Terry Griffiths | 4–2 | 1985/86 |
