= 1985–86 snooker season =

Details
- Duration: July 1985 – May 1986
- Tournaments: 28 (6 ranking events)

Triple Crown winners
- UK Championship: (England) Steve Davis
- Masters: (Canada) Cliff Thorburn
- World Championship: (England) Joe Johnson

The 1985–86 snooker season was a series of snooker tournaments played between July 1985 and May 1986. The following table outlines the results for ranking events and the invitational events.

== New professional players ==
The World Professional Billiards and Snooker Association (WPBSA) accepted the following fifteen players as snooker professionals. Thirty-two players had their applications rejected, including Joe O'Boye, Terry Whitthread and Jon Wright.

- Martin Smith (ENG)
- Dave Gilbert (ENG)
- Barry West (ENG)
- Omprakesh Agrawal (IND)
- Geet Sethi (IND)
- Tony Drago (MLT)
- Francois Ellis (SAF)
- Robbie Grace (SAF)
- Glen Wilkinson (AUS)
- Greg Jenkins (AUS)
- Gordon Robinson (AUS)
- Steve Mizerak (USA)
- Sakchai Sim Ngam (THA)
- Stephen Hendry (SCO)
- Jim Bear (CAN) (re-accepted)

== Calendar ==
Date (Note: Dates use the mm-dd date format.)			Rank	Tournament name	Venue	City	Winner	Runner-up	Score	Reference
08-??	08-??	CAN	NR	Canadian Professional Championship		Toronto	(Canada) Cliff Thorburn	(Canada) Bob Chaperon	6–4	
08–02	08–11	AUS	NR	Australian Professional Championship	Orange RSL	Sydney	(Australia) John Campbell	(Australia) Eddie Charlton	10–7	
08-??	08-??	AUS	NR	Australian Masters	Parmatta Club	Sydney	(England) Tony Meo	(Australia) John Campbell	7–2	
08–21	08–23	SGP	NR	Singapore Masters	Dynasty Hotel	Singapore	(England) Steve Davis	(Wales) Terry Griffiths	4–2	
09-??	09-??	THA	NR	Thailand Masters	Ambassador Hotel	Bangkok	(Northern Ireland) Dennis Taylor	(Wales) Terry Griffiths	4–3	
09–05	09–08	HKG	NR	Hong Kong Masters	Queen Elizabeth Stadium	Wan Chai	(Wales) Terry Griffiths	(England) Steve Davis	4–2	
09–06	09–08	IRL	NR	Carlsberg Challenge	RTÉ Studios	Dublin	(England) Jimmy White	(Northern Ireland) Alex Higgins	8–3	
09-09	09–10	CHN	NR	China Masters	White Swan Hotel	Guangzhou	(England) Steve Davis	(Northern Ireland) Dennis Taylor	2–1	
09–19	09–22	SCO	NR	Scottish Masters	Hospitality Inn	Glasgow	(Canada) Cliff Thorburn	(England) Willie Thorne	9–7	
09–23	10–06	ENG	WR	Matchroom Trophy	Trentham Gardens	Stoke-on-Trent	(Canada) Cliff Thorburn	(England) Jimmy White	12–10	
10-19	10-27	ENG	WR	Grand Prix	Hexagon Theatre	Reading	(England) Steve Davis	(Northern Ireland) Dennis Taylor	10–9	
10–29	11–02	CAN	NR	Canadian Masters	CBC Television Studios	Toronto	(Northern Ireland) Dennis Taylor	(England) Steve Davis	9–5	
11–15	12–01	ENG	WR	UK Championship	Guild Hall	Preston	(England) Steve Davis	(England) Willie Thorne	16–14	
12–04	12–15	ENG	TE	World Doubles Championship	Derngate Centre	Northampton	(England) Steve Davis (England) Tony Meo	(Wales) Ray Reardon (England) Tony Jones	12–5	
12–17	12–20	ENG	NR	Kit Kat Break for World Champions	East Midlands Conference Centre	Nottingham	(Northern Ireland) Dennis Taylor	(England) Steve Davis	9–5	
12-??	12-??	ENG	NR	Pot Black	BBC Studios	Birmingham	(England) Jimmy White	(Canada) Kirk Stevens	2–0	
01–03	01–12	ENG	WR	The Classic	Spectrum Arena	Warrington	(England) Jimmy White	(Canada) Cliff Thorburn	13–12	
01–14	01–17	BEL	NR	Belgian Classic	Ostend Casino	Ostend	(Wales) Terry Griffiths	(Canada) Kirk Stevens	9–7	
01–26	02-02	ENG	NR	The Masters	Wembley Conference Centre	London	(Canada) Cliff Thorburn	(England) Jimmy White	9–5	
02–04	02–09	ENG	NR	English Professional Championship	Corn Exchange	Ipswich	(England) Tony Meo	(England) Neal Foulds	9–7	
02–10	02–14	WAL	NR	Welsh Professional Championship	Abertillery Leisure Centre	Abertillery	(Wales) Terry Griffiths	(Wales) Doug Mountjoy	9–3	
02–16	03–02	ENG	WR	British Open	Assembly Rooms	Derby	(England) Steve Davis	(England) Willie Thorne	12–7	
03–10	03–16	SCO	NR	Scottish Professional Championship	Marco's Leisure Centre	Edinburgh	(Scotland) Stephen Hendry	(Scotland) Matt Gibson	10–5	
03–20	03–23	ENG	TE	World Cup	Bournemouth International Centre	Bournemouth	All Ireland A	Canada	9–7	
04–08	04–13	IRL	NR	Irish Masters	Goff's	Kill	(England) Jimmy White	(England) Willie Thorne	9–5	
04–19	05-05	ENG	WR	World Snooker Championship	Crucible Theatre	Sheffield	(England) Joe Johnson	(England) Steve Davis	18–12	
05–10	05–17	WAL	NR	Pontins Professional	Pontins	Prestatyn	(Wales) Terry Griffiths	(England) Willie Thorne	9–6	
05–20	05–23	NIR	NR	Irish Professional Championship	Mayfield Leisure Centre	Belfast	(Northern Ireland) Dennis Taylor	(Northern Ireland) Alex Higgins	10–7	

WR = World ranking event
NR = Non-ranking event
TE = Team event

== Official rankings ==
The top 16 of the world rankings, these players automatically played in the final rounds of the world ranking events and were invited for the Masters.

No.	Ch.	Name
1	Steady	(England) Steve Davis
2	▲	(Canada) Cliff Thorburn
3	▼	(England) Tony Knowles
4	▲	(Northern Ireland) Dennis Taylor
5	▼	(Canada) Kirk Stevens
6	▼	(Wales) Ray Reardon
7	Steady	(England) Jimmy White
8	Steady	(Wales) Terry Griffiths
9	Steady	(Northern Ireland) Alex Higgins
10	Steady	(England) Tony Meo
11	▲	(England) Willie Thorne
12	▼	(Australia) Eddie Charlton
13	▲	(South Africa) Silvino Francisco
14	▲	(England) David Taylor
15	Steady	(Wales) Doug Mountjoy
16	▲	(England) Joe Johnson
