= 1987 Irish Masters =

Irish Masters
Tournament information
- Dates: 24–29 March 1987
- Venue: Goffs
- City: Kill
- Country: Ireland
- Organisation: WPBSA
- Format: Non-Ranking event
- Total prize fund: £100,000
- Winner's share: £25,000
- Highest break: Dennis Taylor (NIR) (117)

Final
- Champion: (England) Steve Davis
- Runner-up: (England) Willie Thorne
- Score: 9–1

The 1987 Irish Masters was the thirteenth edition of the professional invitational snooker tournament, which took place from 24 to 29 March 1987. The tournament was played at Goffs in Kill, County Kildare, and featured twelve professional players.

Steve Davis won the title for the third time, beating Willie Thorne 9–1 in the final.

== Main draw ==
Round 1 Best of 9 frames
(England) Tony Meo	5
(England) Tony Knowles	2
(Wales) Terry Griffiths	5
(Northern Ireland) Alex Higgins	1
(England) Willie Thorne	5
(Canada) Kirk Stevens	1
(Northern Ireland) Dennis Taylor	5
(Republic of Ireland) Eugene Hughes	4

Quarter-finals; Best of 9 frames
(England) Steve Davis	5
(England) Tony Meo	2
(Wales) Terry Griffiths	5
(England) Joe Johnson	0
(England) Willie Thorne	5
(England) Jimmy White	4
(Northern Ireland) Dennis Taylor	5
(Canada) Cliff Thorburn	1

Semi-finals; Best of 11 frames
(England) Steve Davis	6
(Wales) Terry Griffiths	2
(England) Willie Thorne	6
(Northern Ireland) Dennis Taylor	2

Final; Best of 17 frames
(England) Steve Davis	9
(England) Willie Thorne	1
