= 1990 Scottish Masters =

Scottish Masters
Tournament information
- Dates: 12–16 September 1990
- Venue: Motherwell Civic Centre
- City: Motherwell
- Country: Scotland
- Organisation: WPBSA
- Format: Non-ranking event
- Total prize fund: £96,000
- Winner's share: £35,000
- Highest break: Stephen Hendry (SCO) (138)

Final
- Champion: (Scotland) Stephen Hendry
- Runner-up: (Wales) Terry Griffiths
- Score: 10–6

The 1990 Regal Scottish Masters was a professional non-ranking snooker tournament that took place between 12 and 16 September 1990 at the Motherwell Civic Centre in Motherwell, Scotland.

Stephen Hendry won the tournament by defeating Terry Griffiths 10–6 in the final.

== Prize fund ==
The breakdown of prize money for this year is shown below:

- Winner: £35,000
- Runner-up: £17,500
- Semi-final: £9,000
- Quarter-final: £4,500
- Round 1: £2,000
- Highest break: £3,500
- Total: £96,000

== Main draw ==
Round 1 Best of 11 Frames
(Wales) Darren Morgan | 6
(England) Dean Reynolds | 3
(England) Steve James | 6
(England) Mike Hallett | 5

Quarter-finals; Best of 11 Frames
(Scotland) Stephen Hendry | 6
(Wales) Darren Morgan | 4
(England) Jimmy White | 6
(Wales) Doug Mountjoy | 5
(England) Steve Davis | 1
(England) Steve James | 6
(Wales) Terry Griffiths | 6
(England) John Parrott | 3

Semi-finals; Best of 11 Frames
(Scotland) Stephen Hendry | 6
(England) Jimmy White | 4
(Wales) Terry Griffiths | 6
(England) Steve James | 3

Final; Best of 19 Frames
(Scotland) Stephen Hendry | 10
(Wales) Terry Griffiths | 6
