= 1984 Irish Masters =

Irish Masters
Tournament information
- Dates: 27 March – 1 April 1984
- Venue: Goffs
- City: Kill
- Country: Ireland
- Organisation: WPBSA
- Format: Non-Ranking event
- Total prize fund: £45,000
- Winner's share: £15,000
- Highest break: Steve Davis (ENG) (101)

Final
- Champion: (England) Steve Davis
- Runner-up: (Wales) Terry Griffiths
- Score: 9–1

The 1984 Irish Masters was the tenth edition of the professional invitational snooker tournament, which took place from 27 March to 1 April 1984. The tournament was played at Goffs in Kill, County Kildare, and featured twelve professional players.

Steve Davis won the title for the second time, beating Terry Griffiths 9–1 in the final.

== Main draw ==
Round 1 Best of 9 frames
(England) Tony Meo	5
(England) Jimmy White	4
(Northern Ireland) Alex Higgins	5
(Australia) Eddie Charlton	2
(Wales) Terry Griffiths	5
(Canada) Bill Werbeniuk	2
(Northern Ireland) Dennis Taylor	5
(Republic of Ireland) Eugene Hughes	1

Quarter-finals; Best of 9 frames
(England) Steve Davis	5
(England) Tony Meo	4
(Northern Ireland) Alex Higgins	5
(Wales) Ray Reardon	2
(Wales) Terry Griffiths	5
(England) Tony Knowles	0
(Northern Ireland) Dennis Taylor	5
(Canada) Cliff Thorburn	2

Semi-finals; Best of 11 frames
(England) Steve Davis	6
(Northern Ireland) Alex Higgins	4
(Wales) Terry Griffiths	6
(Northern Ireland) Dennis Taylor	5

Final; Best of 17 frames
(England) Steve Davis	9
(Wales) Terry Griffiths	1
