= 1984 Singapore Masters =

Singapore Masters
Tournament information
- Dates: 21–22 August 1984
- Venue: Mandarin Hotel
- Country: Singapore
- Organisation: WPBSA
- Format: Non-ranking event
- Highest break: Steve Davis (ENG) (81)

Final
- Champion: Terry Griffiths (WAL)
- Runner-up: Steve Davis (ENG)
- Score: Round-Robin

The 1984 Camus Singapore Masters was a professional non-ranking snooker tournament which took place between 21 and 22 August 1984 at the Mandarin Hotel in Singapore.

The event was held as a round robin with each player facing the others once. Professionals Steve Davis, Terry Griffiths and Tony Meo participated along with two local players, Benjamin Liu and Lau Weng Yew. Griffiths won the tournament, finishing unbeaten, and placing top of the round robin league table on points countback, ahead of Davis.

== Results ==
1984 Singapore Masters match results
Player	Score	Player
Steve Davis (ENG)	2–0	Lau Weng Yew (SIN)
Terry Griffiths (WAL)	1–1	Benjamin Liu (SIN)
Tony Meo (ENG)	1–1	Steve Davis (ENG)
Tony Meo (ENG)	2–0	Benjamin Liu (SIN)
Terry Griffiths (WAL)	2–0	Lau Weng Yew (SIN)
Lau Weng Yew (SIN)	1–1	Benjamin Liu (SIN)
Tony Meo (ENG)	2–0	Lau Weng Yew (SIN)
Steve Davis (ENG)	2–0	Benjamin Liu (SIN)
Terry Griffiths (WAL)	2–0	Tony Meo (ENG)
Steve Davis (ENG)	1–1	Terry Griffiths (WAL)
