= 1985 Irish Masters =

Irish Masters
Tournament information
- Dates: 26–31 March 1985
- Venue: Goffs
- City: Kill
- Country: Ireland
- Organisation: WPBSA
- Format: Non-Ranking event
- Total prize fund: £80,000
- Winner's share: £20,000
- Highest break: Jimmy White (ENG) (120)

Final
- Champion: (England) Jimmy White
- Runner-up: (Northern Ireland) Alex Higgins
- Score: 9–5

The 1985 Irish Masters was the eleventh edition of the professional invitational snooker tournament, which took place from 26 to 31 March 1985. The tournament was played at Goffs in Kill, County Kildare, and featured twelve professional players.

Jimmy White won the title for the first time, beating Alex Higgins 9–5 in the final.

== Main draw ==
Round 1 Best of 9 frames
(England) Jimmy White	5
(England) Tony Meo	1
(Australia) Eddie Charlton	5
(Northern Ireland) Dennis Taylor	4
(Northern Ireland) Alex Higgins	5
(Wales) Terry Griffiths	2
(Republic of Ireland) Eugene Hughes	5
(Wales) Ray Reardon	0

Quarter-finals; Best of 9 frames
(England) Jimmy White	5
(Canada) Cliff Thorburn	3
(England) Tony Knowles	5
(Australia) Eddie Charlton	3
(Northern Ireland) Alex Higgins	5
(Canada) Kirk Stevens	3
(England) Steve Davis	5
(Republic of Ireland) Eugene Hughes	4

Semi-finals; Best of 11 frames
(England) Jimmy White	6
(England) Tony Knowles	4
(Northern Ireland) Alex Higgins	6
(England) Steve Davis	2

Final; Best of 17 frames
(England) Jimmy White	9
(Northern Ireland) Alex Higgins	5
