= 1984 New Zealand Masters =

New Zealand Masters
Tournament information
- Dates: July 1984
- Venue: Kingsgate Convention Centre
- City: Auckland
- Country: New Zealand
- Organisation: WPBSA
- Format: Non-ranking event
- Total prize fund: NZ$12,000
- Winner's share: NZ$12,000
- Highest break: (England) Jimmy White, 108

Final
- Champion: (England) Jimmy White
- Runner-up: (Canada) Kirk Stevens
- Score: 5–3

The 1984 Winfield New Zealand Masters was a professional invitational snooker tournament, which took place in July 1984 at Trillos in the Kingsgate Convention Centre in Auckland, New Zealand. The tournament was recorded for a series of one-hour broadcasts on TV New Zealand starting in October 1984.

Jimmy White won the tournament by beating Kirk Stevens 5–3 in the final, in which White made breaks of 108 and 103. There was a prize fund of NZ$50,000. White won NZ$12,000 as champion, and a further NZ$2000 for manking the highest break of the tournament. Stevens took NZ$7000 as runner-up.

== Main draw ==
Results for the event are shown below.

Round 1 Best of 5 Frames
(England) Jimmy White	3
(Northern Ireland) Dennis Taylor	1
(England) David Taylor	3
(England) Willie Thorne	2
(Canada) Kirk Stevens	3
(England) Tony Meo	2
(Wales) Doug Mountjoy	3
(England) John Virgo	1

Quarter-finals; Best of 5 Frames
(England) Tony Knowles	0
(England) Jimmy White	3
(Canada) Cliff Thorburn	0
(England) David Taylor	3
(Canada) Bill Werbeniuk	1
(Canada) Kirk Stevens	3
(Australia) Eddie Charlton	3
(Wales) Doug Mountjoy	1

Semi-finals; Best of 7 Frames
(England) Jimmy White	4
(England) David Taylor	1
(Canada) Kirk Stevens	4
(Australia) Eddie Charlton	1

Final; Best of 9 Frames
(England) Jimmy White	5
(Canada) Kirk Stevens	3
