= Irish Masters =

Professional snooker tournament

Tournament information
- Venue: Ormonde Hotel
- Location: Kilkenny
- Country: Ireland
- Established: 1975
- Organisation(s): World Professional Billiards and Snooker Association
- Format: Non-ranking event
- Final year: 2007
- Final champion: (England) Ronnie O'Sullivan

The Irish Masters was a professional snooker tournament. It was founded in 1978, following on from the successful Benson & Hedges Ireland Tournament (alternatively known as the Benson & Hedges Ireland Championship). The final champion of the tournament was Ronnie O'Sullivan.

== History ==
=== Early events ===
The event started out in 1975 as the Benson & Hedges Challenge Match between Alex Higgins and John Spencer. The match initially carried a £250 prize for the winner and £150 for the runner-up, but both players agreed to a "winner-takes-all" format. Spencer scored two centuries (a 121 and a 109) and despite Higgins leading 7–5, Spencer won four frames in a row to win. In 1976 and 1977 it was expanded to a four-man invitational event, called the Benson & Hedges Ireland Tournament.

=== Irish Masters ===
In 1978 the tournament was renamed the Irish Masters and continued as an ever-present fixture on the snooker calendar until 2005. Benson & Hedges continued their sponsorship with the tournament being played at Goffs, County Kildare. After tobacco sponsorship was outlawed in the Ireland in 2000, the Irish government funded the event from 2001 and it was subsequently relocated to the Citywest Hotel, Saggart, County Dublin. The tournament was staged on an invitational basis for most of its existence but became a ranking tournament from the 2002/03 season. The event was dropped from the calendar in the 2005/2006 season. In 2007, a three-day invitational event known as the Kilkenny Irish Masters was staged with 16 players. It attracted a strong field with 9 of the world's top 16 players taking part, with Ronnie O'Sullivan winning the title.

The tournament was dominated most of all by Steve Davis, who won it eight times. It was won by Irish players on two occasions, Alex Higgins in 1989 and Ken Doherty in 1998. Doherty claimed the title despite losing in the final 3–9 against Ronnie O'Sullivan, as O'Sullivan subsequently failed a drugs test after testing positive for cannabis. There was only one official maximum break in the history of the tournament. John Higgins made it in the quarter-finals of the 2000 event against Jimmy White. There has been one further maximum break in 2007 by O'Sullivan, but it is not included in the list of official maximum breaks, as the table was not to the required standards used on the professional circuit.

== Winners ==
Year	Winner	Runner-up	Final score	Venue	Season
Benson & Hedges Challenge Match (non-ranking)
1975	(England) John Spencer	(Northern Ireland) Alex Higgins	9–7	(Republic of Ireland) Dublin	1974/75
Benson & Hedges Ireland Tournament (non-ranking)
1976	(England) John Spencer	(Northern Ireland) Alex Higgins	5–0	(Republic of Ireland) Dublin	1975/76
1977	(Northern Ireland) Alex Higgins	(Wales) Ray Reardon	5–3	(Republic of Ireland) Dublin (Leopardstown)	1976/77
Irish Masters (non-ranking)
1978	(England) John Spencer	(Wales) Doug Mountjoy	5–3	(Republic of Ireland) Kill	1977/78
1979	(Wales) Doug Mountjoy	(Wales) Ray Reardon	6–5	(Republic of Ireland) Kill	1978/79
1980	(Wales) Terry Griffiths	(Wales) Doug Mountjoy	9–8	(Republic of Ireland) Kill	1979/80
1981	(Wales) Terry Griffiths	(Wales) Ray Reardon	9–7	(Republic of Ireland) Kill	1980/81
1982	(Wales) Terry Griffiths	(England) Steve Davis	9–5	(Republic of Ireland) Kill	1981/82
1983	(England) Steve Davis	(Wales) Ray Reardon	9–2	(Republic of Ireland) Kill	1982/83
1984	(England) Steve Davis	(Wales) Terry Griffiths	9–1	(Republic of Ireland) Kill	1983/84
1985	(England) Jimmy White	(Northern Ireland) Alex Higgins	9–5	(Republic of Ireland) Kill	1984/85
1986	(England) Jimmy White	(England) Willie Thorne	9–5	(Republic of Ireland) Kill	1985/86
1987	(England) Steve Davis	(England) Willie Thorne	9–1	(Republic of Ireland) Kill	1986/87
1988	(England) Steve Davis	(England) Neal Foulds	9–4	(Republic of Ireland) Kill	1987/88
1989	(Northern Ireland) Alex Higgins	(Scotland) Stephen Hendry	9–8	(Republic of Ireland) Kill	1988/89
1990	(England) Steve Davis	(Northern Ireland) Dennis Taylor	9–4	(Republic of Ireland) Kill	1989/90
1991	(England) Steve Davis	(England) John Parrott	9–5	(Republic of Ireland) Kill	1990/91
1992	(Scotland) Stephen Hendry	(Republic of Ireland) Ken Doherty	9–6	(Republic of Ireland) Kill	1991/92
1993	(England) Steve Davis	(Scotland) Alan McManus	9–4	(Republic of Ireland) Kill	1992/93
1994	(England) Steve Davis	(Scotland) Alan McManus	9–8	(Republic of Ireland) Kill	1993/94
1995	(England) Peter Ebdon	(Scotland) Stephen Hendry	9–8	(Republic of Ireland) Kill	1994/95
1996	(Wales) Darren Morgan	(England) Steve Davis	9–8	(Republic of Ireland) Kill	1995/96
1997	(Scotland) Stephen Hendry	(Wales) Darren Morgan	9–8	(Republic of Ireland) Kill	1996/97
1998	(Republic of Ireland) Ken Doherty *	(England) Ronnie O'Sullivan	Disqualified	(Republic of Ireland) Kill	1997/98
1999	(Scotland) Stephen Hendry	(England) Stephen Lee	9–8	(Republic of Ireland) Kill	1998/99
2000	(Scotland) John Higgins	(Scotland) Stephen Hendry	9–4	(Republic of Ireland) Kill	1999/00
2001	(England) Ronnie O'Sullivan	(Scotland) Stephen Hendry	9–8	(Republic of Ireland) Saggart	2000/01
2002	(Scotland) John Higgins	(England) Peter Ebdon	10–3	(Republic of Ireland) Saggart	2001/02
Irish Masters (ranking)
2003	(England) Ronnie O'Sullivan	(Scotland) John Higgins	10–9	(Republic of Ireland) Saggart	2002/03
2004	(England) Peter Ebdon	(England) Mark King	10–7	(Republic of Ireland) Saggart	2003/04
2005	(England) Ronnie O'Sullivan	(Wales) Matthew Stevens	10–8	(Republic of Ireland) Saggart	2004/05
Kilkenny Irish Masters (non-ranking)
2007	(England) Ronnie O'Sullivan	(England) Barry Hawkins	9–1	(Republic of Ireland) Kilkenny	2006/07

== See also ==
- Irish Open
- Irish Professional Championship
- 2011 Alex Higgins International Trophy

== Notes ==
* Ronnie O'Sullivan was disqualified and stripped of the title in 1998 after a 9–3 win over Ken Doherty.
O'Sullivan failed a drugs test after testing positive for cannabis. Doherty was awarded the title.
