= 1980 World Challenge Cup =

State Express World Challenge Cup
Tournament information
- Dates: 18–26 October 1980
- Venue: New London Theatre
- City: London
- Country: England
- Format: Non-ranking event
- Total prize fund: £35,000
- Winner's share: £10,000
- Highest break: Terry Griffiths (WAL), 109

Final
- Champion: Wales
- Runner-up: Canada
- Score: 8–5

The 1980 World Challenge Cup sponsored by State Express was the second team snooker tournament. The format mostly remained the same as the previous championship although the group 2nd place players would now reach a semi-final stage with the group winners. It took place between 18 and 26 October 1980 and the tournament had now moved to the New London Theatre which had hosted the Masters championship between 1976 and 1978.

Terry Griffiths made the highest break of the tournament, 109.

== Main draw ==
Teams and results are shown below.

=== Teams ===
Country	Player 1 (Captain)	Player 2	Player 3
Wales	Ray Reardon	Terry Griffiths	Doug Mountjoy
England	Fred Davis	David Taylor	John Virgo
(Northern Ireland) (Republic of Ireland) Ireland	Alex Higgins	Dennis Taylor	Patsy Fagan
Canada	Cliff Thorburn	Bill Werbeniuk	Kirk Stevens
Australia	Eddie Charlton	Paddy Morgan	Ian Anderson
Rest of the World	(South Africa) Perrie Mans	(Scotland) Eddie Sinclair	(United States) Jim Rempe

=== Group A ===
Team 1	Score	Team 2	Date
Wales	10–5	Canada	
Canada	9–6	Rest of the World	
Wales	13–2	Rest of the World	

=== Group B ===
Team 1	Score	Team 2	Date
England	11–4	(Northern Ireland) (Republic of Ireland) Ireland	
England	7–8	Australia	
(Northern Ireland) (Republic of Ireland) Ireland	10–5	Australia	

=== Semi-finals ===
Team 1	Score	Team 2	Date
Wales	8–7	(Northern Ireland) (Republic of Ireland) Ireland	
England	5–8	Canada	

== Final ==
Final: Best of 15 frames. Referee: New London Theatre, London, England. 26 October 1980.
Wales; Ray Reardon, Terry Griffiths, Doug Mountjoy	8–5	Canada; Cliff Thorburn, Bill Werbeniuk, Kirk Stevens
Mountjoy v Stevens: 28–71, 60–43, 16-94; Reardon v Werbeniuk: 73–45; Griffiths v Thorburn: 43–86; Reardon v Stevens: 54–53; Mountjoy v Werbeniuk: 86–17; Griffiths v Stevens: 22–79; Mountjoy v Thorburn: 55–56; Griffiths v Werbeniuk: 92-38, 87-20, 55–46; Reardon v Thorburn: 111–26
	Highest break	
	Century breaks	
	50+ breaks	
