= 1981 Irish Masters =

Irish Masters
Tournament information
- Dates: 18–22 February 1981
- Venue: Goffs
- City: Kill
- Country: Ireland
- Organisation: WPBSA
- Format: Non-Ranking event
- Total prize fund: £14,000
- Winner's share: £5,000
- Highest break: Terry Griffiths (WAL) (93)

Final
- Champion: (Wales) Terry Griffiths
- Runner-up: (Wales) Ray Reardon
- Score: 9–7

The 1981 Irish Masters was the seventh edition of the professional invitational snooker tournament, which took place from 18 to 22 February 1981. The tournament was played at Goffs in Kill, County Kildare, and featured ten professional players.

Terry Griffiths won the title for the second time, beating Ray Reardon 9–7 in the final.

== Main draw ==
Round 1 Best of 7 frames
(England) Steve Davis	4
(England) John Virgo	3
(Northern Ireland) Dennis Taylor	4
(England) John Spencer	2

Quarter-finals; Best of 7 frames
(Wales) Terry Griffiths	4
(Canada) Kirk Stevens	0
(Canada) Cliff Thorburn	4
(Wales) Doug Mountjoy	0
(Wales) Ray Reardon	4
(England) Steve Davis	2
(Northern Ireland) Alex Higgins	4
(Northern Ireland) Dennis Taylor	2

Semi-finals; Best of 11 frames
(Wales) Terry Griffiths	6
(Canada) Cliff Thorburn	5
(Wales) Ray Reardon	6
(Northern Ireland) Alex Higgins	5

Final; Best of 17 frames
(Wales) Terry Griffiths	9
(Wales) Ray Reardon	7
