= 1980 Irish Masters =

Irish Masters
Tournament information
- Dates: 13–16 February 1980
- Venue: Goffs
- City: Kill
- Country: Ireland
- Organisation: WPBSA
- Format: Non-Ranking event
- Total prize fund: £8,000
- Winner's share: £2,500
- Highest break: Dennis Taylor (NIR) (91)

Final
- Champion: Terry Griffiths (WAL)
- Runner-up: Doug Mountjoy (WAL)
- Score: 10–9

The 1980 Irish Masters was the sixth edition of the professional invitational snooker tournament, which took place from 13 to 16 February 1980. The tournament was played at Goffs in Kill, County Kildare, and featured eight professional players.

Terry Griffiths won the title for the first time, beating Doug Mountjoy 10–9 in the final.

Dennis Taylor compiled the highest break of the tournament, 91, in his match against Alex Higgins.

== Results ==
Results from the tournament are shown below.

=== Group 1 ===
Table

POS	Player	MP	MW	FW	FL
1	Doug Mountjoy (WAL)	3	3	7	2
2	Fred Davis (ENG)	3	2	5	4
3	John Spencer (ENG)	3	1	4	5
4	Ray Reardon (WAL)	3	0	2	7

Results:

- Doug Mountjoy 3–0 Ray Reardon
- Doug Mountjoy 2–1 Fred Davis
- John Spencer 2–1 Ray Reardon
- Fred Davis 2–1 John Spencer
- Fred Davis 2–1 Ray Reardon
- Doug Mountjoy 2–1 John Spencer

=== Group 2 ===
Table

POS	Player	MP	MW	FW	FL
1	Alex Higgins (NIR)	3	3	6	3
2	Terry Griffiths (WAL)	3	2	4	3
3	Dennis Taylor (NIR)	3	1	3	6
4	Cliff Thorburn (CAN)	3	0	3	6

Results:

- Alex Higgins 2–1 Terry Griffiths
- Alex Higgins 2–1 Cliff Thorburn
- Alex Higgins 2–1 Dennis Taylor
- Dennis Taylor 2–1 Cliff Thorburn
- Terry Griffiths 2–1 Cliff Thorburn
- Terry Griffiths 3–0 Dennis Taylor

=== Semi-final ===
- Terry Griffiths (WAL) 4–1 Fred Davis (ENG)
- Doug Mountjoy (WAL) 4–1 Alex Higgins (NIR)

=== Final ===
- Terry Griffiths (WAL) 10–9 Doug Mountjoy (WAL)
