= 1990 Irish Masters =

Irish Masters
Tournament information
- Dates: 27 March – 1 April 1990
- Venue: Goffs
- City: Kill
- Country: Ireland
- Organisation: WPBSA
- Format: Non-Ranking event
- Total prize fund: £150,000
- Winner's share: £37,000
- Highest break: John Parrott (ENG) (99); Willie Thorne (ENG) (99)

Final
- Champion: (England) Steve Davis
- Runner-up: (Northern Ireland) Dennis Taylor
- Score: 9–4

The 1990 Irish Masters was the sixteenth edition of the professional invitational snooker tournament, which took place from 27 March to 1 April 1990. The tournament was played at Goffs in Kill, County Kildare, and featured twelve professional players.

Steve Davis won the title for the fifth time, beating Dennis Taylor 9–4 in the final.

== Main draw ==
Round 1 Best of 9 frames
(England) Willie Thorne	5
(England) Mike Hallett	1
(Wales) Terry Griffiths	5
(Wales) Doug Mountjoy	1
(Northern Ireland) Dennis Taylor	5
(Canada) Cliff Thorburn	4
(England) Jimmy White	5
(England) Joe Johnson	4

Quarter-finals; Best of 9 frames
(England) Steve Davis	5
(England) Willie Thorne	3
(Wales) Terry Griffiths	5
(England) John Parrott	3
(Northern Ireland) Dennis Taylor	5
(Northern Ireland) Alex Higgins	2
(England) Jimmy White	5
(Scotland) Stephen Hendry	2

Semi-finals; Best of 11 frames
(England) Steve Davis	6
(Wales) Terry Griffiths	3
(Northern Ireland) Dennis Taylor	6
(England) Jimmy White	5

Final; Best of 17 frames
(England) Steve Davis	9
(Northern Ireland) Dennis Taylor	4
