= 1981 Pontins Professional =

Tournament information
- Dates: 9–16 May 1981
- Venue: Pontin's
- City: Prestatyn
- Country: Wales
- Organisation: WPBSA
- Format: Non-Ranking event
- Winner's share: £3,500

Final
- Champion: (Wales) Terry Griffiths
- Runner-up: (England) Willie Thorne
- Score: 9–8

The 1981 Pontins Professional was the eighth edition of the professional invitational snooker tournament which took place between 9 and 16 May 1981 in Prestatyn, Wales.

The tournament featured eight professional players. The quarter-final matches were contested over the best of 9 frames, the semi-final matches over the best of 9 frames, and the final over the best of 17 frames.

Terry Griffiths won the event for the first time, beating Willie Thorne 9–8 in the final.

== Main draw ==
Quarter-finals; Best of 9 frames
(Wales) Terry Griffiths	5
(England) Steve Davis	2
(Wales) Doug Mountjoy	5
(Northern Ireland) Dennis Taylor	4
(England) Willie Thorne	5
(Wales) Ray Reardon	3
(Wales) Cliff Wilson	5
(England) John Virgo	3

Semi-finals; Best of 9 frames
(Wales) Terry Griffiths	5
(Wales) Doug Mountjoy	4
(England) Willie Thorne	5
(Wales) Cliff Wilson	4

Final; Best of 17 frames
(Wales) Terry Griffiths	9
(England) Willie Thorne	8
