= 1986 Irish Masters =

Irish Masters
Tournament information
- Dates: 8–13 April 1986
- Venue: Goffs
- City: Kill
- Country: Ireland
- Organisation: WPBSA
- Format: Non-Ranking event
- Total prize fund: £90,000
- Winner's share: £22,500
- Highest break: Willie Thorne (ENG) (112)

Final
- Champion: (England) Jimmy White
- Runner-up: (England) Willie Thorne
- Score: 9–5

The 1986 Irish Masters was the twelfth edition of the professional invitational snooker tournament, which took place from 8 to 13 April 1986. The tournament was played at Goffs in Kill, County Kildare, and featured twelve professional players.

Jimmy White won the title for the second time, beating Willie Thorne 9–5 in the final.

== Main draw ==
Round 1 Best of 9 frames
(England) Tony Meo	5
(Northern Ireland) Alex Higgins	4
(Republic of Ireland) Patsy Fagan	w/o
(Canada) Kirk Stevens	w/d
(England) Willie Thorne	5
(Wales) Terry Griffiths	2
(Republic of Ireland) Eugene Hughes	5
(Wales) Ray Reardon	2

Quarter-finals; Best of 9 frames
(England) Jimmy White	5
(England) Tony Meo	2
(Republic of Ireland) Patsy Fagan	5
(England) Tony Knowles	4
(England) Willie Thorne	5
(Northern Ireland) Dennis Taylor	2
(Canada) Cliff Thorburn	5
(Republic of Ireland) Eugene Hughes	1

Semi-finals; Best of 11 frames
(England) Jimmy White	6
(Republic of Ireland) Patsy Fagan	0
(England) Willie Thorne	6
(Canada) Cliff Thorburn	4

Final; Best of 17 frames
(England) Jimmy White	9
(England) Willie Thorne	5

== Century breaks ==
- 112 – Willie Thorne
- 108, 105 – Jimmy White
