= 1983 Irish Masters =

Irish Masters
Tournament information
- Dates: 22–27 March 1983
- Venue: Goffs
- City: Kill
- Country: Ireland
- Organisation: WPBSA
- Format: Non-Ranking event
- Total prize fund: £35,000
- Winner's share: £12,000
- Highest break: Steve Davis (ENG) (133)

Final
- Champion: (England) Steve Davis
- Runner-up: (Wales) Ray Reardon
- Score: 9–2

The 1983 Irish Masters was the ninth edition of the professional invitational snooker tournament, which took place from 22 to 27 March 1983. The tournament was played at Goffs in Kill, County Kildare, and featured twelve professional players.

Steve Davis won the title for the first time, beating Ray Reardon 9–2 in the final.

== Main draw ==
Round 1 Best of 9 frames
(Australia) Eddie Charlton	5
(England) David Taylor	4
(Wales) Doug Mountjoy	5
(England) Tony Knowles	1
(England) Jimmy White	5
(Northern Ireland) Dennis Taylor	4
(England) Tony Meo	5
(Republic of Ireland) Pascal Burke	0

Quarter-finals; Best of 9 frames
(England) Steve Davis	5
(Australia) Eddie Charlton	1
(Wales) Terry Griffiths	5
(Wales) Doug Mountjoy	4
(Northern Ireland) Alex Higgins	5
(England) Jimmy White	4
(Wales) Ray Reardon	5
(England) Tony Meo	4

Semi-finals; Best of 11 frames
(England) Steve Davis	6
(Wales) Terry Griffiths	2
(Northern Ireland) Alex Higgins	3
(Wales) Ray Reardon	6

Final; Best of 17 frames
(England) Steve Davis	9
(Wales) Ray Reardon	2
