= Terry Griffiths =

Welsh snooker player (1947–2024)

Terry Griffiths OBE
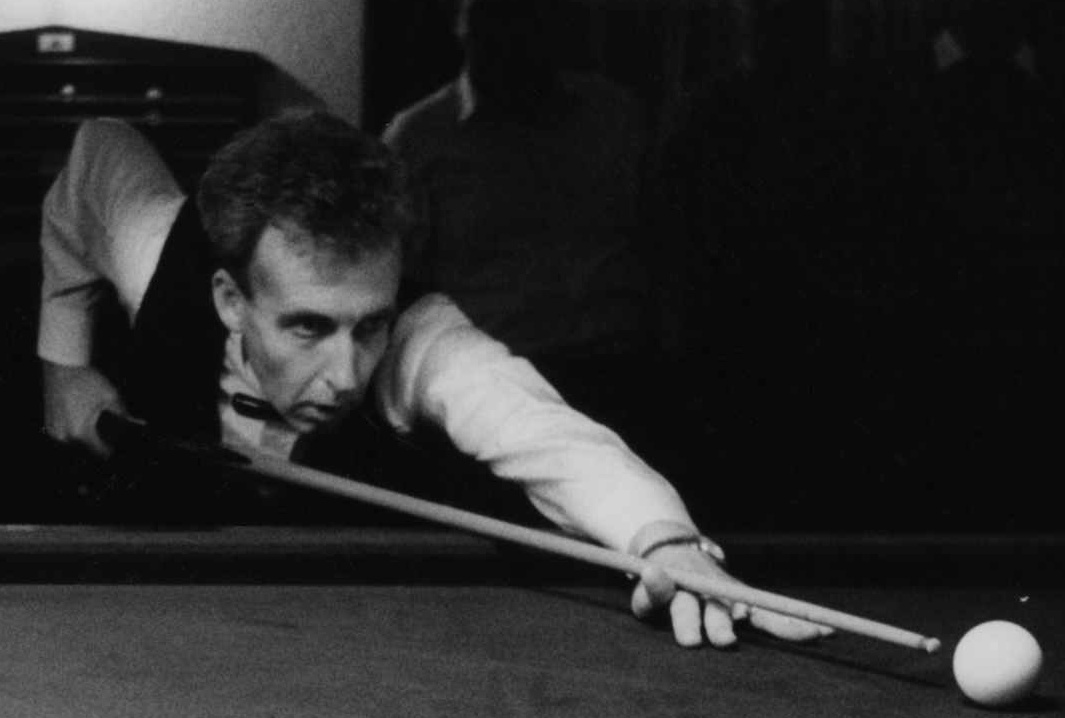
- Griffiths in 1991

Personal information
- Nickname: Griff
- Born: 16 October 1947 Llanelli, Carmarthenshire, Wales
- Died: 1 December 2024 (aged 77) Llanelli, Carmarthenshire, Wales

Sport
- Country: Wales
- Sport: Snooker
- Professional: 1978–1997
- Highest ranking: 3 (1981/82)

Tournament wins
- Ranking: 1
- World Championship: 1979

Terence Martin Griffiths (16 October 1947 – 1 December 2024) was a Welsh professional snooker player, coach, and commentator. He won several amateur championships, including the Welsh Amateur Championship in 1975 and consecutive English Amateur Championship titles in 1977 and 1978, before turning professional in 1978 at the age of 30.

Griffiths won the 1979 World Snooker Championship as a qualifier, defeating Alex Higgins in the quarter-finals, Eddie Charlton in the semi-finals, and Dennis Taylor 24–16 in the final. He was only the second qualifier to win the World Championship, after Higgins in 1972; only Shaun Murphy (2005) and Zhao Xintong (2025) have repeated the feat. He reached a second World Championship final in 1988, losing 11–18 to Steve Davis after being level at 8–8.

Between 1984 and 1992, Griffiths reached at least the quarter-finals of the World Championship for nine consecutive years. He won the Masters in 1980 and the UK Championship in 1982, completing snooker’s Triple Crown. He was also runner-up at the Masters three times and reached the final of the 1989 European Open, losing the deciding frame to John Parrott.

Later in his career, Griffiths focused on coaching and mentoring, serving as the World Professional Billiards and Snooker Association's director of coaching. He worked with several leading players, including Stephen Hendry, Mark Williams, and Ding Junhui. Griffiths retired from professional competition in 1997 and died in December 2024, aged 77, following a prolonged illness related to dementia.

== Early years ==
Griffiths was born in Llanelli on 16 October 1947. He was admitted to a grammar school but was expelled for truancy and became a student at a secondary modern school, where he played rugby union with future Welsh national-team members Phil Bennett and Derek Quinnell. Griffiths began playing snooker when he was 14. After leaving school at 15, he worked as a blacksmith's apprentice and as a coal miner and became the youngest winner of the Llanelli and District snooker championship at age 16. Griffiths subsequently began working as a bus conductor, a job which gave him more time to practise. He later worked as a postman and as an insurance salesman.

At age 17, Griffiths won the West Wales snooker championship. When he was 18 and working as a bus conductor, he met Annette Jones; they married in 1969. They had their first son, Wayne, a year and a half after their wedding, and their other son, Darren, two years later. Griffiths compiled his first century break at age 24, the first year he entered the Welsh Amateur Championship (where he was runner-up). Griffiths played in the amateur home internationals fourteen times, winning twelve of his matches; after winning the Welsh Amateur Championship in 1975, he reached the quarter-finals of the 1976 World Amateur Snooker Championship. He won the English Amateur Championship in 1977, defeating Sid Hood 13–3 in the final, and retained the title the following year, winning the final 13–6 against Joe Johnson.

== Professional career ==
=== 1978–1982 ===
Griffiths became a professional player on 1 June 1978 after he was accepted as a member by the World Professional Billiards and Snooker Association (WPBSA) at its meeting during the 1978 World Snooker Championship. Anticipating his acceptance as a professional, Snooker Scene said in May 1978 that "his power screws and long potting are second to no one's ... it will not be in the least surprising, if very soon he becomes a serious challenger for snooker's top professional titles."

In his first professional match, qualifying for the 1978 UK Championship, Griffiths lost 8–9 to Rex Williams after leading 8–2. Williams took a 2–1 lead; Griffiths won the next seven frames, and Williams took the following seven. In the deciding frame, Griffiths rushed when potting the pink ball and went in-off, a foul shot. Williams later potted the pink for the victory. After qualifying for the 1979 World Championship by eliminating Bernard Bennett 9–2 (from 0–2 behind) and Jim Meadowcroft 9–6 (from 6–6), Griffiths defeated the previous year's runner-up Perrie Mans 13–8 in the first round and Alex Higgins 13–12 in the quarter-finals. After beating Eddie Charlton 19–17 in a long semi-final which finished at 1:40 am, Griffiths told interviewer David Vine: "I'm in the final now, you know." In the final, he faced Dennis Taylor, who had been a professional since 1973 and was also playing in his first World Championship final. The match was close for the first four of the six sessions and level at 15–15 before Griffiths took a 17–16 lead and won 24–16, becoming World Champion at his first attempt. It was Griffiths's second tournament as a professional. The result saw him placed eighth in the 1979/1980 world rankings. He was the second player to win the championship after playing in qualifying (after Higgins in 1972), and the first to win it as a qualifier at the Crucible in Sheffield, the venue for the championship since 1977. As of 2025, only two other players have achieved the feat, Shaun Murphy in 2005, and Zhao Xintong in 2025.

Griffiths reached the final of the 1979 Canadian Open the following season, losing 16–17 to Cliff Thorburn, and was part of the Welsh team that won the inaugural World Cup of snooker; Ray Reardon, Doug Mountjoy and Griffiths defeated England 14–3 in the final. At the end of 1979, Griffiths faced John Virgo in the UK Championship final. Virgo had been penalised two frames for arriving late to a session (not realising that the start time had been moved up as requested by the television broadcasters), which reduced his lead to 9–11. When the scores were 11–11, Griffiths offered to split the prize money. Virgo declined and went on to win the match 14–13.

Griffiths was named the BBC Cymru Wales Sports Personality of the Year for 1979, and was the subject for a This Is Your Life episode the following year. He won the 1980 Masters, defeating Higgins 9–5 in front of 2,323 spectators (a record crowd for a UK snooker event) at the Wembley Conference Centre after compiling a break of 131 to win the deciding frame. It was his first Masters appearance and his only Masters title, although he was runner-up at the event three times in the subsequent four years. He also won the 1980 Irish Masters, defeating Mountjoy 10–9 in the final.

Defending champion at the 1980 World Championship, Griffiths lost the first seven frames against Davis in his first-round match and ended the first session trailing 1–7. Davis won the opening frame of the second session to extend his lead to 8–1, and had a seven-frame lead again at 10–3 before Griffiths won three frames to end the session 6–10 behind. In the third session, Griffiths won the first four frames to level at 10–10; Davis won the next three for a 13–10 victory, which included a 116 break in the 22nd frame. With this first-round defeat, Griffiths became the first victim of the so-called "Crucible curse", a term later adopted to describe the failure of any first-time champion to defend their title at the venue. He moved up three places to fifth in the annual rankings for 1980/1981.

Griffiths and his Wales teammates retained the 1980 World Challenge Cup, and he again won the Irish Masters in 1981 before losing to eventual winner Davis in the quarter-finals of the 1981 World Snooker Championship. Griffiths lost 3–16 to Davis in the 1981 UK Championship final, the first of five finals in consecutive events contested by the pair. Griffiths won two of the five, winning 9–8 on the final black in the deciding frame of the 1982 Classic after Davis had recovered from 3–8 to 8–8. He also won the 1982 Irish Masters, his third consecutive title at the event, defeating Davis 9–5 in the final. After Tony Knowles's surprise 10–1 win over Davis in the first round of the 1982 World Championship, Griffiths became the bookmakers' favourite for the title. However, Griffiths also exited in the first round, losing 6–10 to Willie Thorne. Despite this, he advanced again in the rankings, achieving third place, which would be his highest-ever ranking, in 1981/1982. He won the 1982 UK Championship at the end of the year, defeating Higgins 16–15 in the final.

=== 1983–1989 ===
Griffiths won several further invitational events, including Pot Black in 1984, and the 1984 Malaysian Masters (where he topped a round-robin group in which Tony Meo was the runner-up). He also gained titles at the 1984 Singapore Masters, where he also topped a round-robin group in which Davis was the runner-up; and the 1985 Hong Kong Masters, where he defeated Davis 4–2. The 1985–86 snooker season saw Griffiths win the Welsh Professional Championship for the first time after defeating Mountjoy 9–4. He also won the 1986 Belgian Classic, where he saw off Kirk Stevens 9–7 in the final.

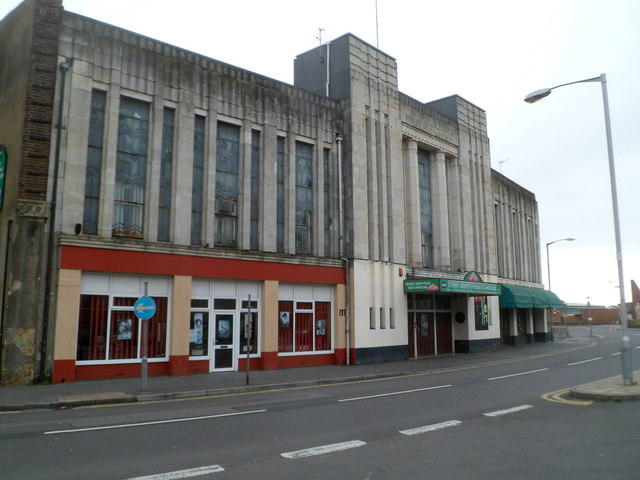
The Terry Griffiths Matchroom in Llanelli

His ranking had dropped to fourteenth in 1982/1983 when his 1979 points were no longer counted towards his total, which at the time was calculated purely on the basis of results in the preceding three World Championships. He improved to ninth in 1983/1984, and was eighth for both 1984/1985 and 1985/1986 before falling to tenth for 1986/1987.

Two months before the 1986 World Snooker Championship, Griffiths began working with coach Frank Callan. After eliminating Higgins 13–12 in the last 16, he praised Callan for helping his game: "I tried to do the right things myself for three years ... Frank has knitted it all together for me. I didn't think anyone knew that much about snooker." He led eventual winner Johnson 12–9 in their quarter-final match, but Johnson won four consecutive frames, two with century breaks, for a 13–12 victory. He ended the season by winning the 1986 Pontins Professional, defeating Thorne in the final.

Griffiths was the only player to reach the televised stages of each ranking tournament in the 1986–87 season, but did not reach the semi-finals in any of them. At the end of the season, he moved up four places in the rankings to sixth. He won the Welsh Professional Championship again in 1986, defeating Doug Mountjoy 9–3. In 1987, Griffiths opened a billiard hall: the Terry Griffiths Matchroom in Llanelli. The next year, he won the 1988 Welsh Professional Championship final 9–3 against Wayne Jones.

At the 1988 World Snooker Championship, Griffiths defeated Steve Longworth, Thorne, Neal Foulds and Jimmy White to reach his second world final, but lost 11–18 to defending champion Davis. The players had been level at 8–8 after the first of two days' play in the final, and Terry Smith of The Daily Telegraph said after the match: "Griffiths knows he produced his best snooker since he became world champion in 1979, and still lost." The 1989 European Open was his only final the following season. Although Griffiths won four of the first five frames, John Parrott tied the scores at 4–4 after the first session. Griffiths later led 8–7, but Parrott won the match (and his first major title) 9–8.

=== 1989–1997 ===
In the 1989–90 snooker season, Griffiths reached the semi-finals of the 1989 Asian Open and the 1989 UK Championship and the quarter-finals of the 1990 World Snooker Championship. His only final was in the 1989 Scottish Masters, where he lost 1–10 to Stephen Hendry. Griffiths dropped one place in the world rankings, to sixth, at the end of the season. The following season, he was again runner-up to Hendry at the Scottish Masters; he had little success in other ranking events, however, and fell from sixth to eleventh place at the season's end.

Griffiths moved back into sixth place after the 1991–92 season, during which he reached three ranking semi-finals, including that of the 1992 World Championship, where he scored victories over Bob Chaperon, Foulds and Peter Ebdon before losing to Hendry. His best performance at a ranking tournament the following season was the semi-final of the 1992 Grand Prix, which he lost 6–9 to Ken Doherty; his best showings at ranking tournaments over the next three seasons were a single quarter-final appearance in each.

At the 1996 World Snooker Championship, Griffiths eliminated Jamie Burnett 10–9 in a first-round final-frame decider after trailing 0–6 and 5–9. In the second round, he lost to old rival Davis (whom he never defeated at the Crucible in six attempts) and announced his retirement from the game to become the World Professional Billiards and Snooker Association's director of coaching. He retired at 23rd in the rankings (the first year since his debut season that he had not been in the top 16). Clive Everton wrote that Griffiths was "the only player to retire when his standard was still in touch with the circuit's top players."

At the 1997 World Championship, Griffiths came out of retirement, and won his qualifying match against Alfie Burden 10–4, to play in the main tournament at the Crucible one last time. He led fellow countryman Mark Williams 9–8 in the first round, but lost the next two frames, each on the final black ball, and was eliminated 9–10. During his professional career, he played a total of 999 frames at the Crucible.

In their book, Masters of the Baize, Luke Williams and Paul Gadsby wrote that Griffiths may have won more tournaments if he had not adjusted his playing technique to challenge Davis. Gordon Burn reported in his 1986 book, Pocket Money, that Reardon felt that Griffiths began to decline as a player after he signed a management contract with Barry Hearn (Davis's manager) at the end of the 1981–82 season, claiming changes Griffiths made to his stance and cueing cost him his "natural flair". Burn wrote that after Hearn became Griffiths's manager, "In the first year, Hearn tripled Griffiths's income and halved his work." He quotes Griffiths: "I just found it difficult to accept that there was a better player than me in the world", but "I wasn't even getting at Steve Davis, because other players were beating me first." Everton wrote about Griffiths's change of technique, "While he acquired an encyclopaedic technical knowledge in the process and maintained an admirable consistency, he could never quite recapture the flair and inspiration that had brought him the world title." As winner of the World Championship, UK Championship and Masters during his career, Griffiths achieved the snooker Triple Crown.

== Later career, retirement and death ==
Griffiths resigned as the WPBSA director of coaching in 1998, describing the association as "a hopeless set-up with no one giving the staff any direction at all." He coached a number of top players, including Mark Allen, Ali Carter, Ding Junhui, Marco Fu, Barry Hawkins, Stephen Hendry, Stephen Maguire, Joe Perry and Mark Williams. Griffiths said about his coaching that "it used to be a lot of technical stuff years ago – probably 90% on the technical side. Now it's the other way about, perhaps 80–20% on the mental side." He was the director of coaching at the South West Snooker Academy, and a snooker commentator for the BBC.

Griffiths received an OBE appointment in 2007 for his "services to snooker". He launched "SQ", a handicapping system for snooker, in 2021. His son, Wayne Griffiths, is head snooker coach at the Hong Kong Sports Institute and has coached three-time World Women's Champion Ng On-yee. During his career, Griffiths won over a million pounds in prize money.

In 2024, his family announced that he had dementia. He died in his hometown of Llanelli, on 1 December 2024, at the age of 77.

== Performance and rankings timeline ==
| Tournament | 1978/ 79 | 1979/ 80 | 1980/ 81 | 1981/ 82 | 1982/ 83 | 1983/ 84 | 1984/ 85 | 1985/ 86 | 1986/ 87 | 1987/ 88 | 1988/ 89 | 1989/ 90 | 1990/ 91 | 1991/ 92 | 1992/ 93 | 1993/ 94 | 1994/ 95 | 1995/ 96 | 1996/ 97 | Ref. |
|---|---|---|---|---|---|---|---|---|---|---|---|---|---|---|---|---|---|---|---|---|
| Ranking | (Note: New players on the Main Tour do not have a ranking.) | 8 | 5 | 3 | 14 | 9 | 8 | 8 | 10 | 6 | 5 | 5 | 6 | 11 | 6 | 8 | 14 | 15 | 23 | |
Ranking tournaments
| Asian Classic (Note: The event was also called the Dubai Masters (1988/1989), Dubai Classic (1989/90–1994/1995) and Thailand Classic (1995/1996).) | Tournament Not Held | | | | | | | | | | NR | A | QF | 2R | QF | 2R | 2R | QF | A | |
| Grand Prix (Note: The event was also called the Professional Players Tournament (1982/1983–1983/1984).) | Tournament Not Held | | | | QF | 3R | 1R | QF | 3R | 3R | QF | 1R | 2R | QF | SF | 1R | 2R | 1R | A | |
| UK Championship | Non-Ranking Event | | | | | | 1R | QF | 3R | QF | SF | SF | 2R | 3R | 1R | QF | 3R | 2R | A | |
| German Open | Tournament Not Held | | | | | | | | | | | | | | | | | 1R | A | |
| Welsh Open | Tournament Not Held | | | | | | | | | | | | | 3R | 2R | 1R | 1R | 2R | A | |
| International Open (Note: The event was also called the Goya Matchroom Trophy (1985/1986).) | Not Held | | | NR | QF | SF | 2R | 3R | 3R | 2R | 1R | 2R | Not Held | | 3R | 3R | 3R | 1R | A | |
| European Open | Tournament Not Held | | | | | | | | | | F | 1R | 2R | SF | 2R | 1R | QF | 2R | A | |
| Thailand Open (Note: The event was also called the Thailand Masters (1983/1984–1986/1987 & 1991/1992) and the Asian Open (1989/1990–1992/1993).) | Tournament Not Held | | | | | Non-Ranking Event | | | | Not Held | | SF | 1R | 1R | 1R | 2R | 1R | 1R | A | |
| British Open (Note: The event was also called the British Gold Cup (1979/1980), Yamaha Organs Trophy (1980/1981) and International Masters (1981/1982–1983/1984).) | NH | Non-Ranking Event | | | | | 2R | QF | 3R | 2R | 1R | 2R | 3R | QF | 1R | 1R | 1R | 1R | A | |
| World Championship | W | 2R | QF | 1R | 2R | QF | QF | QF | QF | F | QF | QF | QF | SF | 2R | 2R | 2R | 2R | 1R | |
Non-ranking tournaments
| Scottish Masters | Not Held | | | A | SF | QF | QF | A | A | F | NH | F | F | A | 1R | A | A | A | A | |
| Charity Challenge | Tournament Not Held | | | | | | | | | | | | | | | | SF | 1R | A | |
| The Masters | A | W | F | F | QF | F | SF | QF | 1R | QF | QF | 1R | SF | 1R | 1R | 1R | QF | WR | A | |
| Seniors Pot Black | Tournament Not Held | | | | | | | | | | | | | | | | | | F | |
| Irish Masters | A | W | W | W | SF | F | 1R | 1R | SF | SF | QF | SF | 1R | 1R | 1R | 1R | A | A | A | |
| Pontins Professional | A | QF | W | SF | RR | QF | W | W | SF | A | A | A | A | A | A | A | A | A | A | |
| Matchroom League (Note: The event was later called the Premier League.) | Tournament Not Held | | | | | A | Not Held | | RR | RR | RR | A | A | A | A | A | A | A | A | |
Former ranking tournaments
| Canadian Masters (Note: The event was also called the Canadian Open (1978/1979–1980/1981).) | Non-Ranking | | | Tournament Not Held | | | | Non-Ranking | | | QF | Tournament Not Held | | | | | | | | |
| Hong Kong Open (Note: The event was also called the Australian Open (1994/1995).) | NH | Ranking Event | | | | | | | | | NH | 2R | Tournament Not Held | | | | Ranking | | NH | |
| Classic | NH | Non-Ranking Event | | | | QF | QF | 1R | QF | QF | 3R | 1R | 1R | 3R | Tournament Not Held | | | | | |
| Strachan Open | Tournament Not Held | | | | | | | | | | | | | 2R | MR | NR | Not Held | | | |
Former non-ranking tournaments
| Champion of Champions | A | NH | RR | Tournament Not Held | | | | | | | | | | | | | | | | |
| International Open | Not Held | | | QF | Ranking Event | | | | | | | | Not Held | | Ranking Event | | | | | |
| Northern Ireland Classic | Not Held | | | SF | Tournament Not Held | | | | | | | | | | | | | | | |
| Classic | NH | SF | QF | W | 1R | Ranking Event | | | | | | | | | Tournament Not Held | | | | | |
| Tolly Cobbold Classic | A | SF | A | A | F | A | Ranking Event | | | | | | | | | | | | | |
| UK Championship | 1R | F | SF | F | W | SF | Ranking Event | | | | | | | | | | | | | |
| British Open | NH | RR | RR | F | 2R | 2R | Ranking Event | | | | | | | | | | | | | |
| Singapore Masters | Tournament Not Held | | | | | | W | F | Tournament Not Held | | | | | | | | | | | |
| KitKat Break for World Champions | Tournament Not Held | | | | | | | SF | Tournament Not Held | | | | | | | | | | | |
| Belgian Classic | Tournament Not Held | | | | | | | W | Tournament Not Held | | | | | | | | | | | |
| Australian Masters (Note: The event was also called the Hong Kong Open (1989/1990) and Australian Open (1994/1995).) | NH | A | A | A | A | A | A | A | SF | A | NH | R | Tournament Not Held | | | | A | A | NH | |
| Malaysian Masters | Tournament Not Held | | | | | | W | NH | QF | Tournament Not Held | | | | | | | | | A | |
| China Masters | Tournament Not Held | | | | | | | A | F | Tournament Not Held | | | | | | | | | A | |
| Tokyo Masters | Tournament Not Held | | | | | | | | | F | Tournament Not Held | | | | | | | | | |
| Canadian Masters | A | F | F | Tournament Not Held | | | | QF | A | QF | R | Tournament Not Held | | | | | | | | |
| Asian Classic | Tournament Not Held | | | | | | | | | | QF | Ranking Event | | | | | | | | |
| Matchroom Professional Championship | Tournament Not Held | | | | | | | | SF | 1R | QF | Tournament Not Held | | | | | | | | |
| London Masters | Tournament Not Held | | | | | | | | | | QF | A | A | Tournament Not Held | | | | | | |
| International League | Tournament Not Held | | | | | | | | | | | RR | Tournament Not Held | | | | | | | |
| Norwich Union Grand Prix | Tournament Not Held | | | | | | | | | | SF | A | QF | Tournament Not Held | | | | | | |
| European Grand Masters | Tournament Not Held | | | | | | | | | | | | QF (Note: Snooker Scene reported "Bond having arrived in the semi-final in unorthodox fashion by losing 3–0 to Griffiths in the quarter-finals".) | Tournament Not Held | | | | | | |
| World Masters | Tournament Not Held | | | | | | | | | | | | QF | Tournament Not Held | | | | | | |
| Welsh Professional Championship | NH | SF | SF | F | SF | SF | W | W | SF | W | F | QF | QF | Tournament Not Held | | | | | | |
| Thailand Masters | Tournament Not Held | | | | | SF | F | F | F | Not Held | | Ranking | | 2R | Ranking Event | | | | | |
| Hong Kong Challenge (Note: The event was also called the Hong Kong Masters (1983/1984–1988/1989).) | Tournament Not Held | | | | | F | QF | W | SF | QF | QF | NH | 1R | 1R | Tournament Not Held | | | | | |
| Indian Challenge | Tournament Not Held | | | | | | | | | | | | | 1R | Tournament Not Held | | | | | |
| World Seniors Championship | Tournament Not Held | | | | | | | | | | | | | SF | Tournament Not Held | | | | | |
| Belgian Challenge | Tournament Not Held | | | | | | | | | | | | | QF | Tournament Not Held | | | | | |
| Kent Classic (Note: The event was also called the Kent Cup (1986/1987–1987/1988 & 1989/90–1990/91.) | Tournament Not Held | | | | | | | | QF | A | A | A | A | NH | SF | Tournament Not Held | | | | |
| Belgian Masters | Tournament Not Held | | | | | | | | | | | | QF | A | 1R | Not Held | | A | NH | |
| World Matchplay | Tournament Not Held | | | | | | | | | | | QF | QF | SF | QF | 1R | Not Held | | | |
| Pot Black | A | RR | A | A | A | W | QF | 1R | Tournament Not Held | | | | | 1R | ?? | QF | Not Held | | | |

Performance Table Legend
| #R | lost in the early rounds of the tournament (WR = Wildcard round, RR = Round robin) | QF | lost in the quarter-finals | SF | lost in the semi-finals |
| F | lost in the final | W | won the tournament | A | did not participate in the tournament |
| ?? | no reliable source available | | | | |

| NH / Not Held | means an event was not held. |
| NR / Non-Ranking Event | means an event is/was no longer a ranking event. |
| R / Ranking Event | means an event is/was a ranking event. |

== Career finals ==
Sources for the ranking and non-ranking final results can be found in the Performance timeline section above.

=== Ranking finals: 3 (1 title) ===
Legend
World Championship (1–1)
Other (0–1)

Ranking tournament finals contested by Terry Griffiths
| Outcome | No. | Year | Championship | Opponent in the final | Score |
|---|---|---|---|---|---|
| Winner | 1. | 1979 | World Championship | Dennis Taylor (NIR) | 24–16 |
| Runner-up | 1. | 1988 | World Championship | Steve Davis (ENG) | 11–18 |
| Runner-up | 2. | 1989 | European Open | John Parrott (ENG) | 8–9 |

=== Non-ranking finals: 39 (17 titles) ===
Legend
UK Championship (1–2) (Note: The UK Championship did not become a ranking event until 1984.)
The Masters (1–3)
Other (15–18)

Non-ranking tournament finals contested by Terry Griffiths
| Outcome | No. | Year | Championship | Opponent in the final | Score |
|---|---|---|---|---|---|
| Runner-up | 1. | 1979 | Canadian Open | Cliff Thorburn (CAN) | 16–17 |
| Runner-up | 2. | 1979 | UK Championship | John Virgo (ENG) | 13–14 |
| Winner | 1. | 1980 | The Masters | Alex Higgins (NIR) | 9–5 |
| Winner | 2. | 1980 | Irish Masters | Doug Mountjoy (WAL) | 10–9 |
| Runner-up | 3. | 1980 | Canadian Open (2) | Cliff Thorburn (CAN) | 10–17 |
| Runner-up | 4. | 1981 | The Masters | Alex Higgins (NIR) | 6–9 |
| Winner | 3. | 1981 | Irish Masters (2) | Ray Reardon (WAL) | 9–7 |
| Winner | 4. | 1981 | Pontins Professional | Willie Thorne (ENG) | 9–8 |
| Runner-up | 5. | 1981 | UK Championship (2) | Steve Davis (ENG) | 3–16 |
| Winner | 5. | 1982 | The Classic | Steve Davis (ENG) | 9–8 |
| Runner-up | 6. | 1982 | The Masters (2) | Steve Davis (ENG) | 5–9 |
| Runner-up | 7. | 1982 | Welsh Professional Championship | Doug Mountjoy (WAL) | 8–9 |
| Runner-up | 8. | 1982 | International Masters | Steve Davis (ENG) | 7–9 |
| Winner | 6. | 1982 | Irish Masters (3) | Steve Davis (ENG) | 9–5 |
| Winner | 7. | 1982 | UK Championship | Alex Higgins (NIR) | 16–15 |
| Runner-up | 9. | 1983 | Tolly Cobbold Classic | Steve Davis (ENG) | 5–7 |
| Runner-up | 10. | 1983 | Hong Kong Masters | Doug Mountjoy (WAL) | 3–4 |
| Winner | 8. | 1984 | Pot Black | John Spencer (ENG) | 2–1 |
| Runner-up | 11. | 1984 | The Masters (3) | Jimmy White (ENG) | 5–9 |
| Runner-up | 12. | 1984 | Irish Masters | Steve Davis (ENG) | 1–9 |
| Runner-up | 13. | 1984 | Thailand Masters | Jimmy White (ENG) | 3–4 |
| Winner | 9. | 1984 | Malaysian Masters | Tony Meo (ENG) | Round-Robin (Note: No play-off. Winner decided via a league format.) |
| Winner | 10. | 1984 | Singapore Masters | Steve Davis (ENG) | Round-Robin |
| Winner | 11. | 1985 | Welsh Professional Championship | Doug Mountjoy (WAL) | 9–4 |
| Winner | 12. | 1985 | Pontins Professional (2) | John Spencer (ENG) | 9–7 |
| Winner | 13. | 1985 | Hong Kong Masters | Steve Davis (ENG) | 4–2 |
| Runner-up | 14. | 1985 | Thailand Masters (2) | Dennis Taylor (NIR) | 0–4 |
| Runner-up | 15. | 1985 | Singapore Masters | Steve Davis (ENG) | 2–4 |
| Winner | 14. | 1986 | Belgian Classic | Kirk Stevens (CAN) | 9–7 |
| Winner | 15. | 1986 | Welsh Professional Championship (2) | Doug Mountjoy (WAL) | 9–3 |
| Winner | 16. | 1986 | Pontins Professional (3) | Willie Thorne (ENG) | 9–6 |
| Runner-up | 16. | 1986 | Thailand Masters (3) | James Wattana (THA) | 1–2 |
| Runner-up | 17. | 1986 | China Masters | Steve Davis (ENG) | 0–3 |
| Runner-up | 18. | 1987 | Tokyo Masters | Dennis Taylor (NIR) | 3–6 |
| Runner-up | 19. | 1987 | Scottish Masters | Joe Johnson (ENG) | 7–9 |
| Winner | 17. | 1988 | Welsh Professional Championship (3) | Wayne Jones (WAL) | 9–3 |
| Runner-up | 20. | 1989 | Welsh Professional Championship (2) | Doug Mountjoy (WAL) | 6–9 |
| Runner-up | 21. | 1989 | Scottish Masters (2) | Stephen Hendry (SCO) | 1–10 |
| Runner-up | 22. | 1990 | Scottish Masters (3) | Stephen Hendry (SCO) | 6–10 |

=== Team finals: 5 (2 titles) ===
Team finals contested by Terry Griffiths
| Outcome | No. | Year | Championship | Team/partner | Opponent(s) in the final | Score | Ref. |
|---|---|---|---|---|---|---|---|
| Winner | 1. | 1979 | World Challenge Cup | Wales | England | 14–3 | |
| Winner | 2. | 1980 | World Challenge Cup (2) | Wales | Canada | 8–5 | |
| Runner-up | 1. | 1981 | World Team Classic | Wales | England | 3–4 | |
| Runner-up | 2. | 1982 | World Doubles Championship | Doug Mountjoy (WAL) | Steve Davis (ENG) and Tony Meo (ENG) | 2–13 | |
| Runner-up | 3. | 1983 | World Team Classic (2) | Wales | England | 2–4 | |

=== Pro-am finals: 3 (2 titles) ===
Pro-am finals contested by Terry Griffiths
| Outcome | No. | Year | Championship | Opponent in the final | Score | Ref. |
|---|---|---|---|---|---|---|
| Runner-up | 1. | 1977 | Pontins Spring Open | Alex Higgins (NIR) | 4–7 | |
| Winner | 1. | 1983 | Pontins Spring Open | Ray Reardon (WAL) | 7–3 | |
| Winner | 2. | 1980 | Rhydcar Pro-am | Doug Mountjoy (WAL) | 5–3 | |

=== Amateur finals: 4 (3 titles) ===
Amateur finals contested by Terry Griffiths
| Outcome | No. | Year | Championship | Opponent in the final | Score | Ref. |
|---|---|---|---|---|---|---|
| Runner-up | 1. | 1972 | Welsh Amateur Championship | Geoff Thomas (WAL) | 2–6 | |
| Winner | 1. | 1975 | Welsh Amateur Championship | Geoff Thomas (WAL) | 8–7 | |
| Winner | 2. | 1977 | English Amateur Championship | Sid Hood (ENG) | 13–3 | |
| Winner | 3. | 1978 | English Amateur Championship (2) | Joe Johnson (ENG) | 13–6 | |

=== Seniors finals: 1 ===
Seniors tournament finals contested by Terry Griffiths
| Outcome | No. | Year | Championship | Opponent in the final | Score |
|---|---|---|---|---|---|
| Runner-up | 1. | 1997 | Seniors Pot Black | Joe Johnson (ENG) | 0–2 |

== Publications ==
| Year | Title | Authors | Publisher | ISBN |
|---|---|---|---|---|
| 1981 | Championship Snooker | Terry Griffiths with Clive Everton | Queen Anne Press, London | ISBN 0362005435 |
| 1984 | Complete Snooker | Terry Griffiths with Julian Worthington | Pelham, London | ISBN 0720715024 |
| 1989 | Griff : the Autobiography of Terry Griffiths | Terry Griffiths with Julian Worthington | Pelham, London | ISBN 0720718864 |
