= 1984 Scottish Masters =

Tournament information
- Dates: 20–23 September 1984
- Venue: Skean Dhu Hotel
- City: Glasgow
- Country: Scotland
- Organisation: WPBSA
- Format: Non-ranking event
- Total prize fund: £28,500
- Winner's share: £10,000

Final
- Champion: Steve Davis (ENG)
- Runner-up: Jimmy White (ENG)
- Score: 9–4

The 1984 Langs Supreme Scottish Masters was a professional non-ranking snooker tournament that took place between 20 and 23 September 1984 at the Skean Dhu Hotel in Glasgow, Scotland.

On the first day Tony Knowles beat Terry Griffiths 5–3, including a break of 102. Jimmy White beat Murdo MacLeod 5–0 in the evening session. In the other two quarter-final matches, Steve Davis beat Cliff Thorburn 5–2 while Alex Higgins also beat Kirk Stevens by the same score.

Jimmy White beat Tony Knowles 6–5 in the semi-finals, the match including two break of 103 by White and a break of 126 by Knowles.

Steve Davis won the tournament by defeating Jimmy White 9–4 in the final.

== Tournament draw ==
Quarter-finals; Best of 9 frames
Steve Davis (ENG)	5
Cliff Thorburn (CAN)	2
Alex Higgins (NIR)	5
Kirk Stevens (CAN)	2
Jimmy White (ENG)	5
Murdo MacLeod (SCO)	0
Tony Knowles (ENG)	5
Terry Griffiths (WAL)	3

Semi-finals; Best of 11 frames
(England) Steve Davis	6
(Northern Ireland) Alex Higgins	4
(England) Jimmy White	6
(England) Tony Knowles	5

Final; Best of 17 Frames
(England) Steve Davis	9
(England) Jimmy White	4
