= 1986 Belgian Classic =

Belgian Classic
Tournament information
- Dates: 14–17 January 1986
- Venue: Ostend Casino
- City: Ostend
- Country: Belgium
- Organisation: WPBSA
- Format: Non-ranking event
- Total prize fund: £40,000
- Winner's share: £12,000
- Highest break: Terry Griffiths (WAL) (121)

Final
- Champion: (Wales) Terry Griffiths
- Runner-up: (Canada) Kirk Stevens
- Score: 9–7

The 1986 BCE Belgian Classic was a professional non-ranking snooker tournament only held once between 14 and 17 January 1986 at the Ostend Casino in Ostend, Belgium.

Terry Griffiths won the tournament, defeating Kirk Stevens 9–7 in the final.

Another championship was due to take place in 1987 played at the same venue between 7 and 15 March. With the withdrawal of all seven of Barry Hearn's Matchroom players including champion Griffiths (they were playing in the new Kent Cup in China around that time), the tournament was cancelled.

== Main draw ==
Quarter-finals; Best of 9 frames
(Wales) Terry Griffiths	5
(England) Steve Davis	2
(England) Tony Knowles	5
(England) Jimmy White	3
(Canada) Kirk Stevens	5
(Wales) Ray Reardon	1
(Northern Ireland) Alex Higgins	5
(Northern Ireland) Dennis Taylor	1

Semi-finals; Best of 9 frames
(Wales) Terry Griffiths	5
(England) Tony Knowles	2
(Canada) Kirk Stevens	5
(Northern Ireland) Alex Higgins	4

Final; Best of 17 frames
(Wales) Terry Griffiths	9
(Canada) Kirk Stevens	7
