= 1987 Grand Prix (snooker) =

Rothmans Grand Prix
Tournament information
- Dates: 17–25 October 1987
- Venue: Hexagon Theatre
- City: Reading
- Country: England
- Organisation: WPBSA
- Format: Ranking event
- Total prize fund: £300,000
- Winner's share: £60,000
- Highest break: John Parrott (ENG) (130)

Final
- Champion: Stephen Hendry (SCO)
- Runner-up: Dennis Taylor (NIR)
- Score: 10–7

The 1987 Rothmans Grand Prix was a professional ranking snooker tournament held at the Hexagon Theatre in Reading, England.

Stephen Hendry won in the final 10–7 against Dennis Taylor. It was his first ranking title and the youngest player to win a ranking tournament at 18 years and 9 months until Ronnie O'Sullivan's 1993 UK Championship title win. Earlier on he had beaten Steve Davis for the first time in his career in the last 16 with a 5–2 win.

== Main draw ==
Last 64; Best of 9 frames
(England) Jimmy White	5
(England) Jon Wright	1
(Malta) Tony Drago	5
(England) Jim Meadowcroft	1
(England) Willie Thorne	5
(Canada) Jim Bear	1
(England) Roger Bales	5
(Australia) John Campbell	3
(England) Paul Gibson	5
(England) Mike Hallett	4
(England) Graham Cripsey	5
(England) Barry West	3
(England) Joe Johnson	5
(England) Steve James	4
(South Africa) Peter Francisco	5
(Scotland) John Rea	3
(Northern Ireland) Dennis Taylor	5
(Wales) Ray Reardon	1
(Canada) Bill Werbeniuk	5
(Australia) Robby Foldvari	1
(Wales) Cliff Wilson	5
(Australia) Glen Wilkinson	4
(England) John Virgo	5
(Canada) Marcel Gauvreau	1
(South Africa) Silvino Francisco	5
(England) Danny Fowler	1
(England) Gary Wilkinson	5
(England) Steve Longworth	4
(Canada) Cliff Thorburn	5
(England) Tony Jones	2
(Wales) Steve Newbury	5
(England) Tony Meo	0
(England) Martin Clark	5
(England) Neal Foulds	4
(England) Mick Fisher	5
(Republic of Ireland) Eugene Hughes	4
(England) Pat Houlihan	5
(England) Dean Reynolds	4
(Canada) Bob Chaperon	5
(England) David Taylor	3
(England) John Parrott	5
(England) Les Dodd	1
(Canada) Kirk Stevens	5
(Wales) Wayne Jones	1
(Wales) Terry Griffiths	5
(Republic of Ireland) Tony Kearney	0
(Wales) Tony Chappel	5
(England) John Spencer	1
(England) Tony Knowles	5
(Northern Ireland) Jack McLaughlin	0
(England) David Roe	5
(England) Dave Martin	4
(England) Ray Edmonds	5
(England) Rex Williams	3
(Australia) Eddie Charlton	5
(South Africa) Jimmy van Rensberg	3
(England) Jim Chambers	5
(Wales) Doug Mountjoy	2
(Scotland) Stephen Hendry	5
(Wales) Mark Bennett	1
(England) Steve Davis	5
(England) Graham Miles	1
(Canada) Jim Wych	5
(Scotland) Murdo MacLeod	4

Last 32; Best of 9 frames
(England) Jimmy White	3
(Malta) Tony Drago	5
(England) Willie Thorne	5
(England) Roger Bales	2
(England) Paul Gibson	4
(England) Graham Cripsey	5
(England) Joe Johnson	2
(South Africa) Peter Francisco	5
(Northern Ireland) Dennis Taylor	5
(Canada) Bill Werbeniuk	3
(Wales) Cliff Wilson	5
(England) John Virgo	3
(South Africa) Silvino Francisco	3
(England) Gary Wilkinson	5
(Canada) Cliff Thorburn	0
(Wales) Steve Newbury	5
(England) Martin Clark	4
(England) Mick Fisher	5
(England) Pat Houlihan	0
(Canada) Bob Chaperon	5
(England) John Parrott	5
(Canada) Kirk Stevens	0
(Wales) Terry Griffiths	5
(Wales) Tony Chappel	3
(England) Tony Knowles	5
(England) David Roe	2
(England) Ray Edmonds	3
(Australia) Eddie Charlton	5
(England) Jim Chambers	1
(Scotland) Stephen Hendry	5
(England) Steve Davis	5
(Canada) Jim Wych	1

Last 16; Best of 9 frames
(Malta) Tony Drago	2
(England) Willie Thorne	5
(England) Graham Cripsey	1
(South Africa) Peter Francisco	5
(Northern Ireland) Dennis Taylor	5
(Wales) Cliff Wilson	2
(England) Gary Wilkinson	3
(Wales) Steve Newbury	5
(England) Mick Fisher	2
(Canada) Bob Chaperon	5
(England) John Parrott	5
(Wales) Terry Griffiths	4
(England) Tony Knowles	5
(Australia) Eddie Charlton	0
(Scotland) Stephen Hendry	5
(England) Steve Davis	2

Quarter-finals; Best of 9 frames
(England) Willie Thorne	3
(South Africa) Peter Francisco	5
(Northern Ireland) Dennis Taylor	5
(Wales) Steve Newbury	2
(Canada) Bob Chaperon	2
(England) John Parrott	5
(England) Tony Knowles	2
(Scotland) Stephen Hendry	5

Semi-finals; Best of 17 frames
(South Africa) Peter Francisco	4
(Northern Ireland) Dennis Taylor	9
(England) John Parrott	7
(Scotland) Stephen Hendry	9

Final; Best of 19 frames
(Northern Ireland) Dennis Taylor	7
(Scotland) Stephen Hendry	10

== Final ==
Final: Best of 19 frames. Referee: Len Ganley; Hexagon Theatre, Reading, England, 25 October 1987.
Stephen Hendry; Scotland	10–7	Dennis Taylor; Northern Ireland
60–68, 52–74 (60), 9–90, 79–0 (79), 26–60, 96–22, 89–11 (58), 73–13, 63–17, 63–48, 69–24, 98–0 (98), 13–121, 79–20, 29–73, 33–80 (52), 76–30
98	Highest break	60
0	Century breaks	0
3	50+ breaks	2
