= 1985 Singapore Masters =

Singapore Masters
Tournament information
- Dates: 21–23 August 1985
- Venue: Dynasty Hotel
- Country: Singapore
- Organisation: WPBSA
- Format: Non-ranking event

Final
- Champion: (England) Steve Davis
- Runner-up: (Wales) Terry Griffiths
- Score: 4–2

The 1985 Camus Singapore Masters was a professional non-ranking snooker tournament which took place between 21 and 23 August 1985 at the Dynasty Hotel in Singapore.

Steve Davis won the tournament, defeating Terry Griffiths 4–2 in the final.

== Results ==
=== Group A ===
POS	Player	MP	MW	FW	FL	FD	PTS
1	(England) Steve Davis	2	2	4	1	+3	4
2	(Singapore) Eddie Loh	2	1	2	2	0	2
3	(England) Tony Meo	2	0	1	4	-3	0

- Steve Davis 2–1 Tony Meo
- Steve Davis 2–0 Eddie Loh
- Eddie Loh 2–0 Tony Meo

=== Group B ===
POS	Player	MP	MW	FW	FL	FD	PTS
1	(Wales) Terry Griffiths	2	1	2	2	0	2
2	(Northern Ireland) Dennis Taylor	2	1	2	2	0	2
3	(Singapore) Lim Koon Guan	2	1	2	2	0	2

- Terry Griffiths 2–0 Lim Koon Guan
- Dennis Taylor 2–0 Terry Griffiths
- Lim Koon Guan 2–0 Dennis Taylor

=== Final ===
- (England) Steve Davis 4–2 Terry Griffiths (Wales)
