= Herbert Beetham =

English billiards player

Personal information
- Born: 1909 Pear Tree, Derby, England
- Died: April 1992 (aged 82) Derby, England

Sport
- Country: England
- Sport: Snooker

James Herbert Beetham (1909 – April 1992) was an English billiards player and soft drink manufacturer. He won the 1960 World Amateur Billiards Championship which also marked the pinnacle of his career. Beetham was regarded as one of the three main pillars of English amateur billiards alongside Frank Edwards and Leslie Driffield.

== Personal life ==
He was married to Florence Maud Beetham until her death in December 1975 and he had a son Philip and daughter Sheila.

== Biography ==
His father James Henry and mother Mary Jane Beetham ran family business which was into manufacturing and selling mineral water. His family moved to Normanton where he spent most of his life. His birthplace, 80 Havelock Road was eventually the factory house of White Brothers family business.

Beetham had not started playing the game of billiards seriously until the age of 19, although he had played billiards occasionally on sporadic circumstances around the age of 14. He began playing on a quarter sized table in the attic at his home. None of his family members were involved in any sport, but his father James Henry had developed a profound interest in the game of billiards.

== Career ==
Beetham ran the family business White Brothers mineral water manufacturing company in Derby taking over from his parents and also became a prominent successful businessman. Despite being a full-time businessman, he pursued his interest of playing billiards mostly considering it as a time pass and hobby. In one of the interviews, he insisted that billiards was always his hobby and never considered it as a his job. He also pointed out that if he had considered billiards as a profession he should have spent huge amount of pounds to play in club level.

He started playing billiards at St. Thomas's Church Institute in the Derby Institute League until 1960 before it was disbanded. He later joined the Walbrook Institute to continue his passion towards playing billiards.

He entered the All England Amateur Billiards Championship in the 1932-33 season and he reached his maiden English Amateur Billiards Championship final in 1936 and lost the final to Joe Thompson by 30 points. During the 1936 English Amateur Billiards Championship, he made a record break under the new 15 hazard limit of 266. He was set to take part at the 1942 English Amateur Billiards Championship but the tournament was called off due to World War II and he was sent back home. He joined the Burton Fire Brigade in 1942 temporarily and served as a firefighter. He was notably one of the firefighters who arrived at the scene early during the RAF Fauld explosion which happened on 27 November 1944 at the RAF Fauld underground munitions storage depot in Staffordshire.

He also reached English Amateur Billiards Championship final in 1946 which was also his post-war final but eventually lost to Manchester's Mendel Showman. In the 1952 English Amateur Championship final against Leslie Driffield he was leading with 98 points when Leslie's cue tip came off and had to use his reserve cue. In the first six visits using the reserve cue Leslie scored a total of only 31 points, compared to his average score per visit of 36.4 in the previous session. Beetham increased his lead to 271, but Driffield fought back, with the help of a 142 break, to be 174 behind at the end of that session. At the end of the match, Driffield was adjudged as the winner by 101 points, 2,894–2,793. He also lost the 1959 English Amateur Billiards Championship final, which was his fourth defeat in as many finals.

After being at the receiving end in four English Amateur Billiards Championship finals, Beetham finally broke the shackles by winning his maiden English Amateur Billiards Championship title in 1960 following a comfortable victory over Reg Wright in the final. He also ended the 24 year wait of registering a major Amateur Billiards Championship. During the 1960 tournament, where he clinched his maiden English Amateur title he averaged with a score of 21 in the tournament although he was on the receiving end in several occasions with such a score.

He also qualified to compete at the 1960 World Amateur Billiards Championship following his triumph at the 1960 English Amateur Billiards Championship. After his triumph at the 1960 English Amateur Billiards Championship, six months later he became the amateur world champion. He defeated Australia's Jim Long in the 1960 World Amateur Championship which was held in Edinburgh. It was his first World Amateur Championship title win as he remained undefeated during the course of the tournament. However, he couldn't defend his world title two years later at the 1962 World Amateur Championship which was held in Perth, Australia. He also won the English Amateur Billiards Championship titles in 1961 and 1962, making it as Hat-trick of titles in English Amateur Championship. He was regarded as a prominent billiards player during the post World War years.

He remained as an amateur billiards player throughout his career without attempting to enter the professional level and instead continued his soft drink manufacturing business from where he left off with his son Philip Beetham. Beetham also served as a founder member and the first President of Derbyshire Billiards and Snooker Association. He too served as Derbyshire's representative of the Billiards and Snooker Control Council.

== Death ==
Beetham died in April 1992 due to cancer at the age of 82 in Derby.
