= 1985 Thailand Masters =

Thailand Masters
Tournament information
- Dates: September 1985
- Venue: Ambassador Hotel
- City: Bangkok
- Country: Thailand
- Organisation: WPBSA
- Format: Non-ranking event

Final
- Champion: (Northern Ireland) Dennis Taylor
- Runner-up: (Wales) Terry Griffiths
- Score: 4–0

The 1985 Thailand Masters was a professional non-ranking snooker tournament held in September 1985 in Bangkok, Thailand.

Eight players entered into two groups four phase with each group winner progressing to the final. Dennis Taylor won the tournament, defeating Terry Griffiths 4–0 in the final.

== Main draw ==
=== Group stage ===
Group A

POS	Player	MP	MW	FW	FL	FD	PTS
1	(Northern Ireland) Dennis Taylor	2	2	4	0	+4	4
2	(England) Willie Thorne	3	1	2	4	-2	2
3	(England) Tony Meo	1	0	1	1	0	1
4	(Thailand) James Wattana	2	0	1	3	-2	1

- Dennis Taylor 2–0 Willie Thorne
- Dennis Taylor 2–0 James Wattana
- Willie Thorne 1–1 Tony Meo
- Willie Thorne 1–1 James Wattana

Group B

POS	Player	MP	MW	FW	FL	FD	PTS
1	(Wales) Terry Griffiths	3	3	6	0	+6	6
2	(England) Tony Knowles	3	2	4	2	+2	4
3	(England) Steve Davis	3	1	2	4	-2	2
4	(Thailand) Sakchai Sim Ngam	3	0	0	6	-6	0

- Terry Griffiths 2–0 Steve Davis
- Terry Griffiths 2–0 Tony Knowles
- Terry Griffiths 2–0 Sakchai Sim Ngam
- Tony Knowles 2–0 Steve Davis
- Tony Knowles 2–0 Sakchai Sim Ngam
- Steve Davis 2–0 Sakchai Sim Ngam

=== Final ===
- (Northern Ireland) Dennis Taylor 4–0 Terry Griffiths (Wales)
