= 1985 Hong Kong Masters =

Hong Kong Masters
Tournament information
- Dates: 5–8 September 1985
- Venue: Queen Elizabeth Stadium
- City: Wan Chai
- Country: Hong Kong
- Organisation: WPBSA
- Format: Non-ranking event

Final
- Champion: (Wales) Terry Griffiths
- Runner-up: (England) Steve Davis
- Score: 4–2

The 1985 Camus Hong Kong Masters was a professional non-ranking snooker tournament held in Hong Kong in September 1985.

Terry Griffiths won the tournament, defeating Steve Davis 4–2 in the final.

== Main draw ==
Quarter-finals; Best of 5 frames
(Wales) Terry Griffiths	3
(Hong Kong) Stanley Leung	1
(England) Tony Meo	3
(Northern Ireland) Dennis Taylor	2
(England) Steve Davis	3
(England) Tony Knowles	1
(England) Willie Thorne	3
(Hong Kong) Gary Kwok	0

Semi-finals; Best of 5 frames
(Wales) Terry Griffiths	3
(England) Tony Meo	2
(England) Steve Davis	3
(England) Willie Thorne	0

Final; Best of 7 frames
(Wales) Terry Griffiths	4
(England) Steve Davis	2
