= Kirk Stevens =

Canadian snooker player

Personal information
- Nickname: The Man in the White Suit
- Born: August 17, 1958 (age 68) Toronto, Ontario, Canada

Sport
- Country: Canada
- Sport: Snooker
- Professional: 1978–1993, 1998/1999
- Highest ranking: 4 (1984/85)
- Maximum breaks: 1
- Best ranking finish: Runner-up (x1)

Kirk Stevens (born August 17, 1958) is a Canadian former professional snooker player.

== Career ==
Stevens started playing young, achieving his first century break aged just 12. He turned professional aged 20, and reached the semi-finals of the World Championship aged 21. In 1984 he achieved a maximum 147 break in a televised match against Jimmy White in the Benson & Hedges Masters, which remained the only such break ever made in the competition until Ding Junhui achieved the same feat in 2007. His stylish choice of attire (he often appeared at major tournaments wearing an all-white suit, as opposed to the traditional black suit with a white shirt) and his youthful 'popstar' good looks made him a pin-up.

In 1985 he was wrongfully accused of taking stimulants before the final of the Dulux British Open Snooker Championship by South African Silvino Francisco. Stevens lost 9–12. Francisco was subsequently fined by the world governing body of snooker, the WPBSA, for the comments. The WPBSA accepted that the accusation was false and it is on record that Stevens has never failed a drugs test in the history of his career. Shortly after the comments were made public, Stevens admitted to an addiction to cocaine in his personal life.

Although he underwent treatment, his career never really recovered. He dropped out of the top 16 in 1986/87, but continued to play on until 1992/93, before returning home to Canada and retiring from professional tournament play on the world circuit.

After returning to Canada, Stevens won the Canadian Amateur Championship in 1997, 1998, 2000, 2002, and 2008. In 2011 he returned to the Crucible Theatre for the first time since 1988 to play in a "Snooker Legends" exhibition event.

On September 23, 2019, Jimmy White published an apology to Stevens on White's official Facebook page stating that in his autobiography Second Wind he misremembered a few stories as occurring with Stevens that in fact did not. These events were widely broadcast in the media and White wanted to make the apology public to prevent them from being repeated. White further stated that he did not intend his words to be interpreted as meaning that Stevens introduced him to crack cocaine or that Stevens ever played WPBSA snooker under the influence of drugs.

== Performance and rankings timeline ==
Tournament	1976/ 77	1977/ 78	1978/ 79	1979/ 80	1980/ 81	1981/ 82	1982/ 83	1983/ 84	1984/ 85	1985/ 86	1986/ 87	1987/ 88	1988/ 89	1989/ 90	1990/ 91	1991/ 92	1992/ 93	1998/ 99
Ranking	(Note: He was an amateur.)		(Note: New players on the tour don't have a ranking)	19	11	10	6	7	4	5	9	21	37	50	68	58	59	
Ranking tournaments
Grand Prix (Note: The event was also called the Professional Players Tournament (1982/83–1983/1984))	Tournament Not Held						2R	QF	QF	QF	1R	2R	1R	LQ	3R	LQ	LQ	LQ
UK Championship	NH	Non-Ranking Event							SF	QF	2R	2R	2R	2R	LQ	LQ	1R	LQ
Irish Open (Note: The event was also called the European Open (1988/1989–1992/1993))	Tournament Not Held												1R	LQ	LQ	1R	LQ	LQ
Welsh Open	Tournament Not Held															1R	LQ	LQ
Scottish Open (Note: The event was also called the Goya Matchroom Trophy and the International Open (1981/1982–1984/1985 & 1986/1987–1992/1993))	Tournament Not Held					NR	SF	WD	1R	1R	1R	1R	WD	LQ	Not Held		LQ	LQ
Thailand Masters (Note: The event was also called the Asian Open (1989/1990–1992/1993))	Tournament Not Held							Non-Ranking Event				Not Held		LQ	LQ	LQ	LQ	LQ
China International	Tournament Not Held																	LQ
British Open (Note: The event was also called the British Gold Cup (1979/1980), Yamaha Organs Trophy (1980/1981) and International Masters (1981/1982–1983/1984))	Not Held			Non-Ranking Event					F	3R	3R	WD	LQ	1R	2R	LQ	LQ	LQ
World Championship	A	A	1R	SF	2R	QF	QF	SF	2R	QF	1R	1R	LQ	LQ	LQ	LQ	LQ	LQ
Non-ranking tournaments
Scottish Masters	Tournament Not Held					QF	A	A	QF	A	SF	A	NH	A	A	A	A	A
Masters	A	A	A	A	1R	A	1R	SF	1R	1R	1R	A	A	A	A	A	A	A
Irish Masters	A	A	A	A	QF	A	A	A	QF	WD	1R	A	A	A	A	A	A	A
Premier League (Note: The event was also called the Professional Snooker League (1983/1984), Matchroom League (1986/1987 to 1991/1992) and the European League (1992/1993 to 1996/1997))	Tournament Not Held							WD	Not Held		A	A	A	A	A	A	A	A
Former ranking tournaments
Canadian Masters (Note: The event was also called the Canadian Open (1978/1979–1980/1981))	Non-Ranking Event					Tournament Not Held				Non-Ranking			LQ	Tournament Not Held				
Classic	Not Held			Non-Ranking Event				QF	2R	1R	2R	1R	1R	LQ	LQ	1R	Not Held	
Strachan Open	Tournament Not Held															1R	MR	NH
Dubai Classic (Note: The event was also called the Dubai Masters (1988/1989))	Tournament Not Held												NR	LQ	1R	2R	LQ	NH
Former non-ranking tournaments
Bombay International	Not Held		A	RR	Tournament Not Held													
Pontins Camber Sands	Not Held			QF	Tournament Not Held													
Canadian Masters (Note: The event was also called the Canadian Open (1976/1977–1980/1981))	1R	1R	QF	SF	SF	Tournament Not Held				A	A	A	R	Tournament Not Held				
Champion of Champions	Not Held		A	NH	RR	Tournament Not Held												
Scottish Open (Note: The event was also called the Goya Matchroom Trophy and the International Open (1981/1982–1984/1985 & 1986/1987–1992/1993))	Tournament Not Held					2R	Ranking Event								Not Held		Ranking	
Northern Ireland Classic	Tournament Not Held					QF	Tournament Not Held											
UK Championship	NH	A	A	A	A	2R	A	A	Ranking Event									
Classic	Not Held			A	A	A	SF	Ranking Event									Not Held	
Tolly Cobbold Classic	Not Held		A	A	SF	A	A	SF	Tournament Not Held									
British Open (Note: The event was also called the British Gold Cup (1979/1980), Yamaha Organs Trophy (1980/1981) and International Masters (1981/1982–1983/1984))	Not Held			A	SF	RR	RR	RR	Ranking Event									
New Zealand Masters	Tournament Not Held								F	Not Held			A	A	Tournament Not Held			
Carlsberg Challenge	Tournament Not Held								SF	A	A	A	A	Tournament Not Held				
Australian Masters	Not Held			A	A	A	A	SF	QF	A	A	A	NH	A	Tournament Not Held			
Pot Black	A	A	A	A	RR	A	RR	1R	1R	F	Tournament Not Held					A	A	NH
Belgian Classic	Tournament Not Held									F	Tournament Not Held							
Canadian Professional Championship	Tournament Not Held				SF	Not Held		W	SF	QF	SF	SF	QF	Tournament Not Held				
World Masters	Tournament Not Held														1R	Not Held		

Performance Table Legend
LQ	lost in the qualifying draw	#R	lost in the early rounds of the tournament (WR = Wildcard round, RR = Round robin)	QF	lost in the quarter-finals
SF	lost in the semi-finals	F	lost in the final	W	won the tournament
DNQ	did not qualify for the tournament	A	did not participate in the tournament	WD	withdrew from the tournament

NH / Not Held	means an event was not held.
NR / Non-Ranking Event	means an event is/was no longer a ranking event.
R / Ranking Event	means an event is/was a ranking event.

== Career finals ==
=== Ranking finals: 1 ===
Outcome	No.	Year	Championship	Opponent in the final	Score
Runner-up	1.	1985	British Open	(South Africa) Silvino Francisco	9–12

=== Non-ranking finals: 6 (3 titles) ===
Outcome	No.	Year	Championship	Opponent in the final	Score
Winner	1.	1979	Canadian Professional Championship	(Canada) Cliff Thorburn	#
Winner	2.	1981	Canadian Professional Championship		#
Winner	3.	1983	Canadian Professional Championship	(Canada) Frank Jonik	9–8
Runner-up	1.	1984	New Zealand Masters	(England) Jimmy White	3–5
Runner-up	2.	1986	Belgian Classic	(Wales) Terry Griffiths	7–9
Runner-up	3.	1986	Pot Black	(England) Jimmy White	0–2

=== Team finals: 4 (1 title) ===
Outcome	No.	Year	Championship	Team/partner	Opponent(s) in the final	Score
Runner-up	1.	1980	World Challenge Cup	Canada	Wales	5–8
Winner	1.	1982	World Team Classic	Canada	England	4–2
Runner-up	2.	1986	World Cup (2)	Canada	(Republic of Ireland) (Northern Ireland) Ireland	7–9
Runner-up	3.	1987	World Cup (3)	Canada	(Republic of Ireland) (Northern Ireland) Ireland	2–9

=== Amateur finals: 6 (6 titles) ===
Outcome	No.	Year	Championship	Opponent in the final	Score
Winner	1.	1978	Canadian Amateur Championship	(Canada) Bob Paquette	10–6
Winner	2.	1997	Canadian Amateur Championship (2)	(Canada) Charlie Brown	6–3
Winner	3.	1998	Canadian Amateur Championship (3)	(Canada) Tom Finstad	7–3
Winner	4.	2000	Canadian Amateur Championship (4)	(Canada) Bob Chaperon	6–3
Winner	5.	2002	Canadian Amateur Championship (5)	(Canada) Cliff Thorburn	6–1
Winner	6.	2008	Canadian Amateur Championship (6)	(Canada) Tom Finstad	6–2
