= 1982 Irish Masters =

Irish Masters
Tournament information
- Dates: 23–28 March 1982
- Venue: Goffs
- City: Kill
- Country: Ireland
- Organisation: WPBSA
- Format: Non-Ranking event
- Total prize fund: £25,000
- Winner's share: £8,000
- Highest break: Steve Davis (ENG) (128)

Final
- Champion: (Wales) Terry Griffiths
- Runner-up: (England) Steve Davis
- Score: 9–5

The 1982 Irish Masters was the eighth edition of the professional invitational snooker tournament, which took place from 23 to 28 March 1982. The tournament was played at Goffs in Kill, County Kildare, and featured twelve professional players.

Terry Griffiths won the title for the third year in a row, beating Steve Davis 9–5 in the final.

== Main draw ==
Round 1 Best of 9 frames
(Wales) Doug Mountjoy | 5
(Republic of Ireland) Eugene Hughes | 4
(Northern Ireland) Alex Higgins | 5
(Canada) Jim Wych | 3
(England) Tony Meo | 5
(England) John Spencer | 3
(Northern Ireland) Dennis Taylor | 5
(Republic of Ireland) Dessie Sheehan | 3

Quarter-finals; Best of 9 frames
(England) Steve Davis | 5
(Wales) Doug Mountjoy | 3
(Northern Ireland) Alex Higgins | 5
(Canada) Cliff Thorburn | 4
(Wales) Terry Griffiths | 5
(England) Tony Meo | 3
(Wales) Ray Reardon | 5
(Northern Ireland) Dennis Taylor | 4

Semi-finals; Best of 11 frames
(England) Steve Davis | 6
(Northern Ireland) Alex Higgins | 2
(Wales) Terry Griffiths | 6
(Wales) Ray Reardon | 3

Final; Best of 17 frames
(England) Steve Davis | 5
(Wales) Terry Griffiths | 9
