= 1981 International Open =

1981 Jameson International Open
Tournament information
- Dates: 14–20 September 1981
- Venue: Assembly Rooms
- City: Derby
- Country: England
- Organisation: WPBSA
- Format: Non-ranking event
- Total prize fund: £66,500
- Winner's share: £20,000
- Highest break: Steve Davis (ENG) (135)

Final
- Champion: (England) Steve Davis
- Runner-up: (Northern Ireland) Dennis Taylor
- Score: 9–0

The 1981 International Open (officially the 1981 Jameson International Open) was the first staging of the professional non-ranking snooker tournament that took place between 14 and 20 September 1981 at the Assembly Rooms in Derby, England. Television coverage was on ITV.

Earlier matches were played at the Romiley Forum in Stockport finishing on 12 September. Four of the last-16 matches were played there with the remaining four played in Derby.

Steve Davis won the tournament by defeating Dennis Taylor 9–0 in the final.

== Main draw ==
Last 24; Best of 9 Frames
(South Africa) Perrie Mans	5
(England) Tony Meo	3
(Canada) Kirk Stevens	5
(England) Jim Meadowcroft	1
(Northern Ireland) Alex Higgins	5
(Republic of Ireland) Patsy Fagan	3
(England) John Spencer	5
(England) Ray Edmonds	3
(England) Rex Williams	5
(England) Fred Davis	0
(England) John Virgo	5
(England) Tony Knowles	2
(England) Dave Martin	5
(Canada) Bill Werbeniuk	2
(England) Graham Miles	5
(England) Joe Johnson	3

Last 16; Best of 9 Frames
(England) Steve Davis	5
(South Africa) Perrie Mans	3
(England) David Taylor	5
(Canada) Kirk Stevens	0
(Wales) Doug Mountjoy	1
(Northern Ireland) Alex Higgins	5
(Wales) Terry Griffiths	5
(England) John Spencer	2
(Northern Ireland) Dennis Taylor	5
(England) Rex Williams	1
(Wales) Ray Reardon	3
(England) John Virgo	5
(Australia) Eddie Charlton	2
(England) Dave Martin	5
(Canada) Cliff Thorburn	0
(England) Graham Miles	5

Quarter-finals; Best of 9 Frames
(England) Steve Davis	5
(England) David Taylor	1
(Northern Ireland) Alex Higgins	5
(Wales) Terry Griffiths	2
(Northern Ireland) Dennis Taylor	5
(England) John Virgo	2
(England) Dave Martin	5
(England) Graham Miles	1

Semi-finals; Best of 17 Frames
(England) Steve Davis	9
(Northern Ireland) Alex Higgins	8
(Northern Ireland) Dennis Taylor	9
(England) Dave Martin	1

Final; Best of 17 Frames
(England) Steve Davis	9
(Northern Ireland) Dennis Taylor	0
