= 1981 Masters (snooker) =

Professional non-ranking snooker tournament, Jan/Feb 1981

1981 Benson & Hedges Masters
Tournament information
- Dates: 27 January – 1 February 1981
- Venue: Wembley Conference Centre
- City: London
- Country: England
- Format: Non-ranking event
- Total prize fund: £20,000
- Winner's share: £6,000
- Highest break: Terry Griffiths (WAL) (136)

Final
- Champion: Alex Higgins (NIR)
- Runner-up: Terry Griffiths (WAL)
- Score: 9–6

The 1981 Masters (officially the 1981 Benson & Hedges Masters) was a professional non-ranking snooker tournament that took place from 27 January to 1 February 1981 at the Wembley Conference Centre in London, England. It was organised by representatives of the sponsors, cigarette brand Benson & Hedges, and sanctioned by the World Professional Billiards and Snooker Association. Twelve players were invited to participate, including debutants Steve Davis and Kirk Stevens.

Terry Griffiths was the defending champion, having defeated Alex Higgins 9–5 in the 1980 final. The same two players contested the 1981 final, this time with Higgins prevailing 9–6. It was a fourth consecutive Masters final for Higgins, and he became the first player to win the Masters twice. Griffiths made the highest break of the tournament, 136, in the 12th frame of the final, surpassing the tournament record of 132 set by Higgins in 1979.

The tournament carried a total prize fund of £20,000, with £6,000 going to the winner. The tournament was televised daily on BBC2 from 29 January, and the final also received coverage on BBC1's Grandstand. There were 2,422 spectators for the final session, a new British record, and the cumulative attendance of 18,722 over six days was a record for an international snooker tournament.

== Overview ==
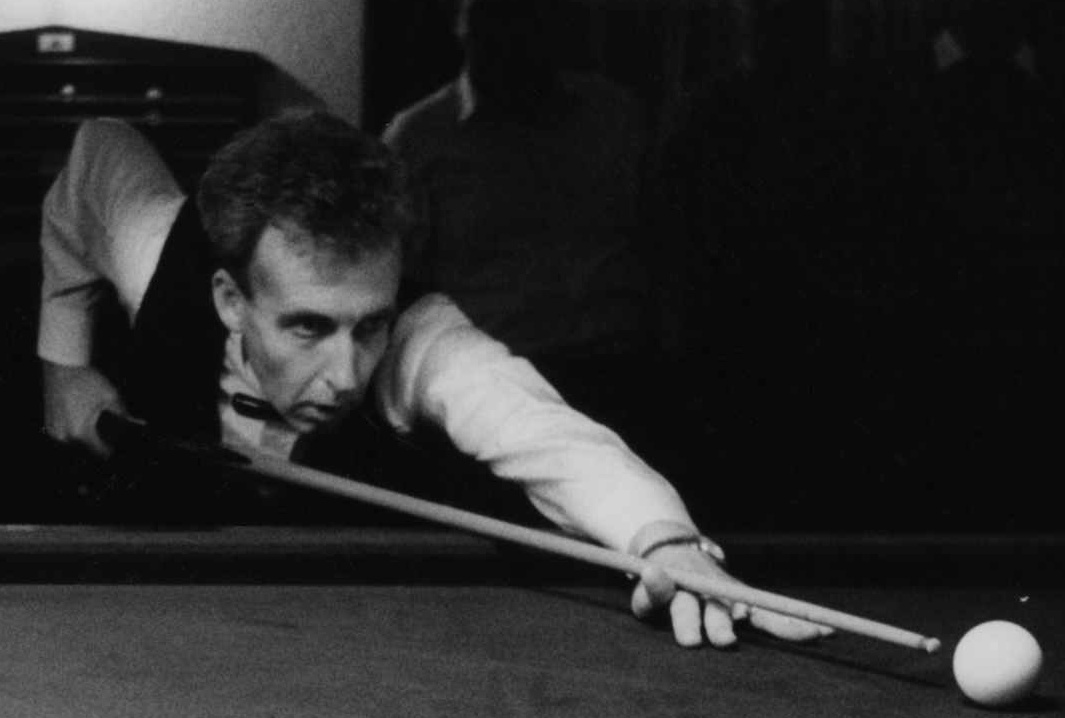
Terry Griffiths (pictured in 1991) was the defending champion.

The 1981 Masters was staged at the Wembley Conference Centre in London and was the seventh edition of the Masters after its establishment in 1975. It was organised by representatives of the sponsors, cigarette brand Benson & Hedges, and sanctioned by the World Professional Billiards and Snooker Association. The field had been extended from the ten in earlier editions to twelve players, and the event was held over six days rather than the previous five. In September 1980 Benson & Hedges invited the top eight players in the 1980–81 snooker world rankings, along with former Masters champions John Spencer and Doug Mountjoy. The last two places went to debutants Kirk Stevens, a semi-finalist at the 1980 World Snooker Championship, and Steve Davis. An article in Snooker Scene magazine speculated that Davis had been chosen "more on the basis of his undeniable promise, and, as a Londoner, his crowd-pulling potential" rather than his achievements. The writer of the article thought the Davis and Stevens were "better box office proposition[s]" than David Taylor, Bill Werbeniuk and John Virgo, who were all ranked above them. Virgo was aggrieved at his omission. After defeating four players who had received Masters invitations – Davis, Stevens, Ray Reardon and Dennis Taylor – at the 1980 Champion of Champions in October 1980, he argued that as the reigning UK Championship holder he should have been invited. Virgo lost his UK title the following month, and the championship was won by Davis, his first major title.

Terry Griffiths was the defending Masters champion, having defeated Alex Higgins 9–5 in the 1980 final. Steve Davis was the bookmakers' pre-tournament favourite to win, with odds of 7/2, followed by Higgins at 4/1, then Griffiths and Reardon both at 11/2.

The tournament was televised daily on BBC2 from 29 January, and the final also received coverage on BBC1's Grandstand.

=== Prize fund ===
The winner's prize was £6,000 from a total prize fund of £20,000. The breakdown of prize money is shown below. £10,000 would have been awarded to the first player making a maximum break. Griffiths received a £250 bonus in addition to the highest break prize of £250, as his break of 136 was a new tournament record.

- Winner: £6,000
- Runner-up: £3,000
- Semi-finals: £2,000
- Quarter-finals: £1,000
- First round: £750
- Highest break: £250
- Total: £20,000

== Summary ==
=== First round ===
First round matches were played on 27 and 28 January as the best-of-nine frames. Fred Davis led Kirk Stevens 2–0, 3–2 and 4–3, with Stevens then levelling the scores each time. Stevens was ahead in the decider when he failed to pot a red when on a break of 45 and Davis went on to win the frame and match. Stevens said afterwards that he had second thoughts when attempting to pot that red, and that "I've tried to absorb so much from [more experienced players] that I'm not playing according to my own instincts any more". Dennis Taylor maintained his streak of never having won a match at the Masters; from 2–2 against John Spencer at the interval, he lost 2–5.

Doug Mountjoy, who was recovering from a bout of Bell's palsy that left him unable to use the muscles on one side of his face, whitewashed Eddie Charlton. Clive Everton of The Guardian described the match between Steve Davis and Perrie Mans as "scrappy". Davis won the first frame, and a break of 91 in frame three gave him a 2–1 lead. Davis led in the fourth frame, but Mans came back and won it on the final pink. Mans moved into a 4–2 lead, and although Davis won frame seven with a break of 54, Mans sealed victory at 5–3 by winning the next frame.

=== Quarter-finals ===
The quarter-finals were played from 29 to 30 January as the best-of-nine frames. Defending champion Griffiths defeated Fred Davis 5–2 after they had been all-square at 2–2. Spencer had practiced intensively before the event, and felt that this paid off as he defeated Reardon 5–1. Reardon took the first frame, but Spencer's break of 51 in frame two, the highest of the match, heralded a run of five consecutive frame wins.

Higgins led Mountjoy 3–1 at their mid-session interval and completed a 5–1 victory. Thorburn made a break of 102 in the fourth frame against Mans. The match went to a deciding frame, which Thorburn won with a break of 84.

=== Semi-finals ===
The semi-finals were held on 31 January as the best-of-eleven frames across two sessions. Spencer established a 5–2 lead against Griffiths, and in the eighth frame Griffiths required two snookers. Griffiths successfully achieved that and won the frame, going on to win 6–5. The match report in Snooker Scene magazine said that Griffiths "ground along in second gear" while, towards the end of the match, Spencer's "cue action had become a little ragged and he was unable to pot vital balls which carried any degree of difficulty."

Thorburn played Higgins, as he had in the 1980 World Championship final. Higgins looked unwell at the beginning of the match, and had an upset stomach that he ascribed to "west country mustard" that he had eaten with a steak the previous evening. At the mid-session interval, Higgins, who was 1–4 behind, had a brief nap. Thorburn won the next frame for a 5–1 lead, then Higgins recovered to 3–5. In the ninth frame, Thorburn was 57 points ahead but after he missed a pot, Higgins compiled a break of 85 to win it. The match went to a deciding frame, which Higgins won with a break of 77 that started with a fluke, to reach the final for the fourth consecutive year. Stevens remarked afterwards that "Cliff [Thorburn] didn't lose that match. Alex [Higgins] won it. Alex is the only player who could have won it from that position."

=== Final ===
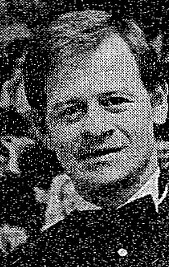
Alex Higgins (pictured in 1988) became the first player to win the Masters twice.

The final between Higgins and Griffiths was played on 1 February as the best-of-17 frames across two sessions. The referee was John Smyth. Higgins won the first frame with a 75 break, which turned out to be the highest of the first session. Griffiths won the next two frames, then Higgins won frame four aided by fluked pots of both the yellow and blue. He increased his lead to 4–2, and was 5–3 ahead at the end of the first session.

In the interval of the 1980 final, Higgins had offered to split the prize money equally, which Griffiths had accepted. In 1981, according to Griffiths in his autobiography, "we were very much in the same position at the interval, [but] he did not ask me to share the money. And when I mentioned this to him later, he said, 'Oh, I fancied beating you that day.'"

Higgins won the first three frames of the second session to lead 8–3. Griffiths made the highest break of the tournament, 136, in the 12th frame, surpassing the tournament record of 132 set by Higgins in 1979. He added the next two frames, but Higgins won frame 15, aided by a break of 34, to secure the title at 9–6 and become the first player to win the Masters for a second time.

There were 2,422 spectators for the final session, a new British record, and the cumulative attendance of 18,722 over six days was a record for an international snooker tournament.

== Main draw ==
The draw for the tournament is shown below. The match winners are shown in bold.

**First round** Best of 9 frames
**Fred Davis (ENG)**	**5**
Kirk Stevens (CAN)	4
Dennis Taylor (NIR)	2
**John Spencer (ENG)**	**5**
Eddie Charlton (AUS)	0
**Doug Mountjoy (WAL)**	**5**
**Perrie Mans (RSA)**	**5**
Steve Davis (ENG)	3

**Quarter-finals**; Best of 9 frames
**Terry Griffiths (WAL)**	**5**
Fred Davis (ENG)	2
Ray Reardon (WAL)	1
**John Spencer (ENG)**	**5**
**Alex Higgins (NIR)**	**5**
Doug Mountjoy (WAL)	1
**Cliff Thorburn (CAN)**	**5**
Perrie Mans (RSA)	4

**Semi-finals**; Best of 11 frames
**Terry Griffiths (WAL)**	**6**
John Spencer (ENG)	5
**Alex Higgins (NIR)**	**6**
Cliff Thorburn (CAN)	5

**Final**; Best of 17 frames
Terry Griffiths (WAL)	6
**Alex Higgins (NIR)**	**9**

== Final: details and frame scores ==
Final
Best of 17 frames. Referee: John Smyth; Wembley Conference Centre, London, England, 1 February 1981. Numbers in parentheses are breaks of 50 or more.
**Alex Higgins (NIR)**	**9**–6	Terry Griffiths (WAL)
First session: **117**–10 (75), 38–**69**, 54–**64**, **62**–47, **99**–38, **58**–31, 20–**69**, **69**–10; Second session: **77**–37, **75**–39, **113**–5, 0–**136** (136), 31–**97**, 51–**62**, **85**–48
75	Highest break	136
0	Century breaks	1
1	50+ breaks	1

== Century breaks ==
The following century breaks were made during the tournament:

- 136 – Terry Griffiths
- 102 – Cliff Thorburn
