= 1987 Masters (snooker) =

Professional non-ranking snooker tournament

1987 Benson & Hedges Masters
Tournament information
- Dates: 25 January – 1 February 1987
- Venue: Wembley Conference Centre
- City: London
- Country: England
- Format: Non-ranking event
- Total prize fund: £200,000
- Winner's share: £51,000
- Highest break: Jimmy White (ENG) (136)

Final
- Champion: Dennis Taylor (NIR)
- Runner-up: Alex Higgins (NIR)
- Score: 9–8

The 1987 Masters (also known as the 1987 Benson and Hedge Masters for sponsorship reasons) was a professional non-ranking snooker tournament that took place from 25 January to 1 February at the Wembley Conference Centre in London, England. The tournament was the 13th edition of the Masters, which was first held in 1975. Organised and sponsored by the cigarette brand Benson and Hedges with the sanction of the World Professional Billiards and Snooker Association, the event was broadcast by the BBC. The winner received £51,000 from a total prize fund of £200,000.

The top 16 players in the 1986–87 snooker world rankings were invited to the event. The defending champion was Cliff Thorburn, who had defeated Jimmy White 9–5 in the previous year's final to win a record-extending third Masters title.

Dennis Taylor won the tournament, defeating Alex Higgins 9–8 in the final to secure his first Masters title. The tournament produced seven century breaks, of which the highest was 136 by White in his first round match against Tony Meo. Ray Reardon made his last appearance in the competition, having participated each year since its inception.

As of 2026, this is the last triple crown final to feature two players from Northern Ireland. This was also the last time a player from Norther Ireland had won the Masters title until Mark Allen triumphed in 2018.

== Overview ==
The Masters was first held in 1975 as an invitational event for ten top players. For 27 years, the annual tournament was organised and promoted by the Gallaher cigarette brand Benson & Hedges with the sanction of the World Professional Billiards and Snooker Association. In 1979 the annual event moved to the Wembley Conference Centre.

As of 1987, the Masters was widely regarded by players as the second-most prestigious snooker tournament, after the World Snooker Championship. Cliff Thorburn was the defending champion, having defeated Jimmy White 9–5 in the 1986 final. Thorburn had also won in 1983 and 1985. The other player to have won the title more than once was Alex Higgins, champion in 1978 and 1981.

The tournament trophy was kept at the Benson and Hedges shop in Mayfair; the winner received a gilded wine jug to keep. The tournament chairman for 1987 was Leonard Owen, the tournament director and MC was Nicholas Hill, and the referees were John Smyth and John Street.

=== Format ===
The top 16 players in the 1986–87 snooker world rankings were invited to participate in the tournament. As the defending champion, Thorburn was the number one seed. Reigning World Champion Joe Johnson was the second seed and the remaining places were allocated to players based on the world rankings.

=== Prize fund ===
The winner of the event received £51,000 from a total prize fund of £200,000. The breakdown of prize money is shown below. The first player to have made a maximum break would have received a gold coloured Ford Sierra as well as the prize for the highest break.

- Winner: £51,000
- Runner-up: £28,000
- Semi-finalists: £16,000
- Quarter-finalists: £11,000
- First round losers: £5,000
- Highest break (qualifying stage included): £5,000
- Total: £200,000

== Summary ==
=== First round ===
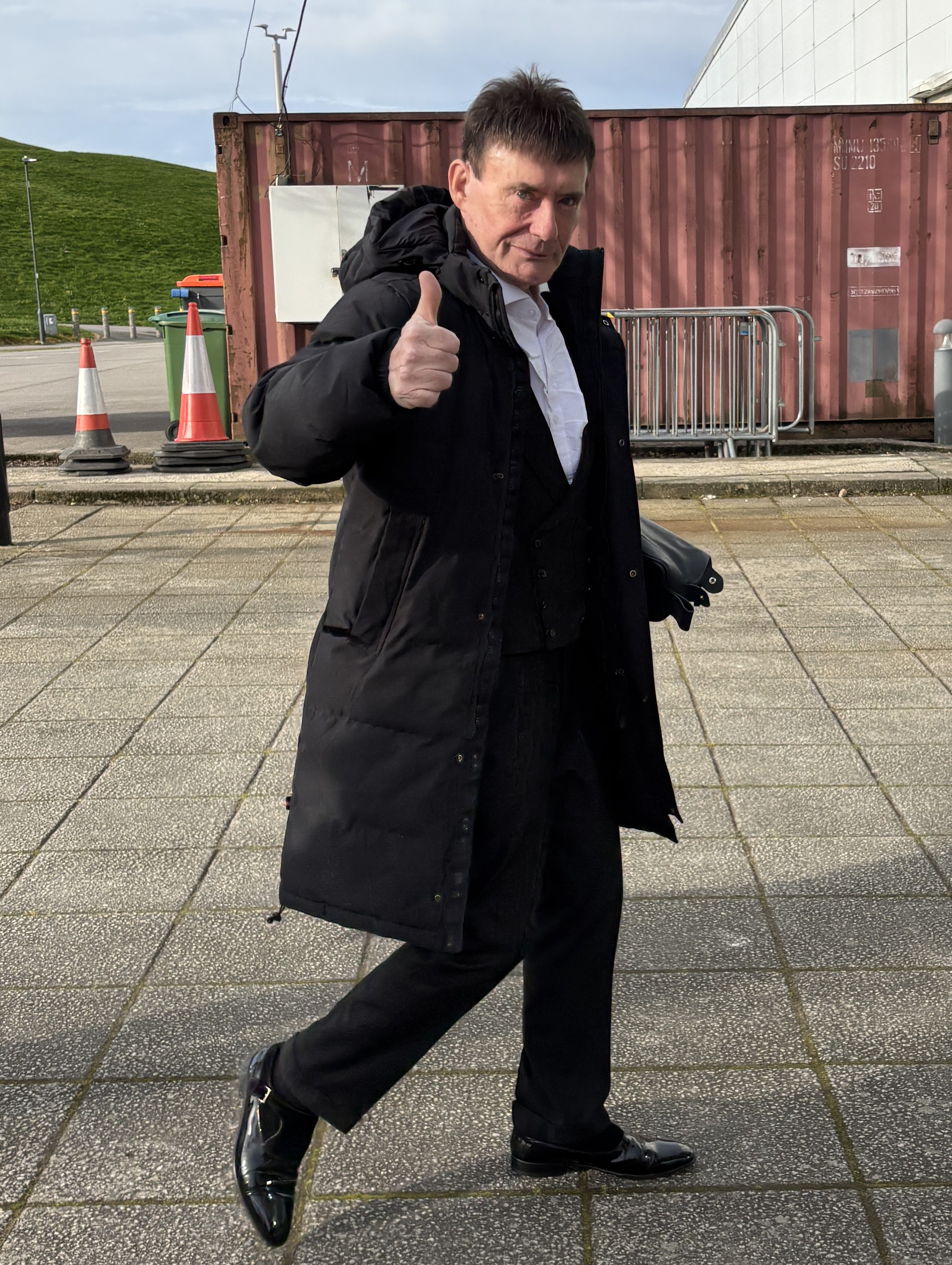
Jimmy White (pictured in 2026) made the highest break of the championship, 136.

The first-round matches were played from 25 to 28 January as the best-of-nine frames. Defending champion Cliff Thorburn took a 3–0 lead against Rex Williams, who was competing in the Masters for the first time in ten years. Williams won only frame four as Thorburn completed a 5–1 victory. The snooker journalist Clive Everton, of Snooker Scene magazine, described Thorburn's performance as "successful if turgid". Kirk Stevens won the first frame against Willie Thorne but lost the next four, including frame five, which was lost on the final black ball. Steven narrowed his deficit to 3–4 before Thorne won frame eight 84–0 to secure a 5–3 victory. According to Everton, Tony Knowles was "testy and uptight, [and] made too many mistakes" as he lost 2–5 to Silvino Francisco. Knowles won frames four and six. Knowles said after the match that he was "annoyed at the way I played. Silvino is an awkward player. He's a good potter, but not that good a player."

Coming into the Masters, Steve Davis was on a 21-match winning streak and had won four consecutive titles. He led 52–7 in the first frame against Doug Mountjoy, but Mountjoy made a break of 44, and after Davis missed an attempt to pot the final red ball, Mountjoy went on to win the frame. Mountjoy built a 4–0 lead, but Davis recovered to 2–4. In frame seven Davis led 27–0 but a break of 90 by Mountjoy clinched victory for him at 5–2. Davis praised Mountjoy's play, saying that "I made only one real mistake the whole match and I got punished severely. Doug never stopped potting balls." Davis also commented that "To me, the Masters is just a money tournament. There's no prestige except the money".

Tony Meo established a 4–1 lead against his old school friend Jimmy White; during the first three frames, White scored only 19 points. White took frame four, but missed potting the green ball in frame five which allowed Meo the opportunity to win that frame. With breaks of 66 in frame seven and 136 in frame eight, White levelled at 4–4. Meo missed two chances to win frame nine before eventually clinching it by a narrow margin.

Dennis Taylor had changed the top section of his cue after it was chewed by his dog shortly before the 1986 Grand Prix. After making the change, he experienced a slump in form, described by Cue World magazine as "the worst playing period of his professional career for at least ten years." A few days before the start of the Masters, he noticed that White's cue also had tooth marks, and decided to revert to using his old top section. Neal Foulds, making his Masters debut, won the fourth frame against Taylor after needing four snookers. Taylor had played in ten previous editions of the Masters but had previously only won one match. The sixth frame was re-racked twice, the first after 13 minutes had been played, and the second after 7 minutes. It was the first time in tournament history that a frame had been restarted twice. Taylor made a break of 101, then took frame seven for a 5–2 win. Foulds said afterwards: "It is a terrible thing to say but I lost interest after the sixth frame in which there were two re-racks. Dennis ... was able to adopt a much more professional attitude."

Before his match against Terry Griffiths, Alex Higgins had left his cue next to a radiator in his dressing room, which warped it. Some supporters of Higgins in the audience booed Griffiths as he entered the arena, and during the match even straightforward shots by Higgins were acclaimed noisily. Higgins won the first frame, and after Griffiths had taken the next two frames, compiled a 118 break to level at 2–2. Griffiths then won frames five and six; during frame six Higgins made what journalist Janice Hale called a "dignified and justified call for order". Higgins took the next two frames to force a decider, which he won. At the end of the match, some spectators jumped into the arena, and the referee John Smyth and stewards intervened to protect Higgins. Griffiths remarked that "I've never been booed ... But I'd like to think that it wasn't directed at me personally. They would have booed anyone playing Alex." Higgins said that the "constant shouting upsets my concentration, just as it must do my opponent."

Ray Reardon, winner of the 1976 Masters, and competing in the event for the 13th time, lost 2–5 to Joe Johnson. Having lost his place in the top 16 of the rankings at the end of the season, he would not be invited back for 1988. Higgins was the only other player to have participated in each Masters tournament since its inception.

=== Quarter-finals ===
The quarter-final matches were the best-of-nine frames and took place on 29 and 30 January. Thorne won the opening frame against Thorburn on the final black, and after Thorburn had levelled at 1–1, took frame three for a 2–1 lead. Thorburn took the next two frames and eventually defeated Thorne 5–2. Everton wrote that "Thorburn never looked really authoritative but ... effectively frustrated Thorne's talents." Francisco built a 3–0 lead against Taylor and looked likely to win frame four until he overstretched when attempting to pot the final red and lost position. Taylor won that frame on the black ball, and, after drawing level at 3–3, finished the match with breaks of 111 in frame seven and 106 in frame eight.

Having led Meo 2–1, Mountjoy lost the next two frames after being well ahead in each. Breaks of 70 and 51 saw him regain the lead at 4–3 before Meo's break of 101 in frame eight put the pair all-square again. In the deciding frame, Meo led by 22 points with one red left. Mountjoy then cleared to the pink, but a failed positional shot on his attempt to pot the black saw it finish in the jaws of the pocket. After potting the black to win the match, Meo said "Doug played better than I did ... I don't think many have played as well as Doug and got beaten." Mountjoy said of the final black that "There was no way I was going to play safe. That never entered my mind." Johnson won only frame four as Higgins defeated him 5–1. Johnson had led 57–0 in the first frame but lost it 57–69. Johnson remarked that he was "delighted" not to be booed, and commended Higgins as a "sportsman".

=== Semi-finals ===
The semi-finals were scheduled for 31 January as the best-of-eleven frames. Thorburn took a 2–0 lead against Taylor. Taylor took the third frame, and added the fourth with a break of 105, his fourth century break of the tournament. Taylor later fluked the black to level the match at 4–4, and went on to lead 5–4, but Thorburn won frame ten to force a decider, which Taylor won on the final black.

Meo won the first frame against Higgins, but then lost the next four; the third frame went to a respotted black. Meo lost 2–6 and commented afterward that "He just shut me out."

=== Final ===
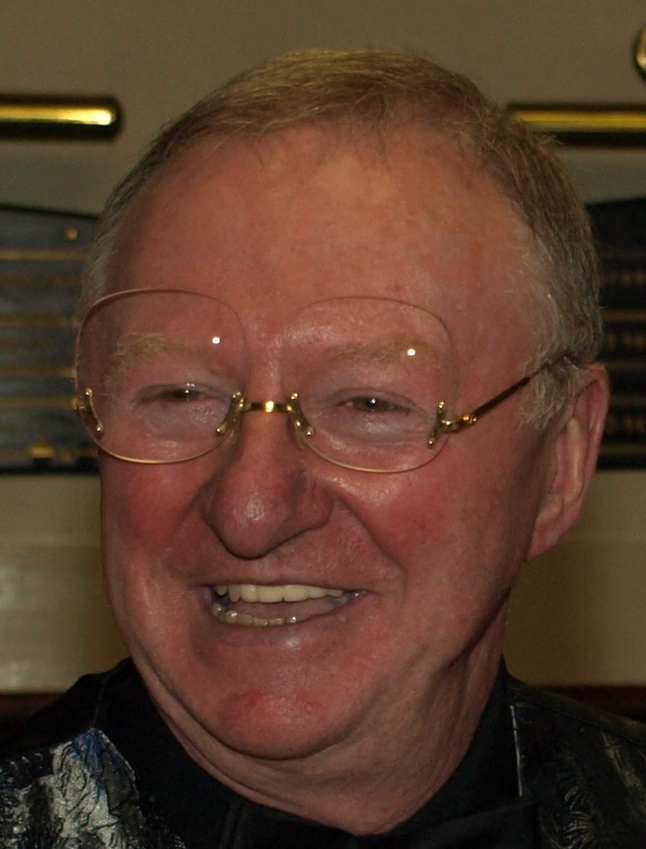
Dennis Taylor (pictured in 2009) won the tournament on the deciding frame.

The final between Higgins and Taylor was played as the best-of-17 frames across two sessions, starting at 2:00 pm and 7:00 pm, on 1 February. The first session was of seven frames, and the second had ten frames. John Smyth was the referee. Higgins led Taylor 4–3 after the first session. From 5–5, he built an 8–5 lead. In frame 14, Higgins led by 40 points with three reds remaining. Attempting a safety shot on the only red that was not in a safe position, Higgins failed and left it in a position where Taylor potted it. The cue ball moved the other two reds into pottable positions, and Taylor cleared to the pink with a break of 44. Taylor played safe on the final red, and Higgins's attempt to keep it safe was unsuccessful, as Taylor potted the black to win the frame. Taylor won the next three frames to win the title on the decider. Higgins said after the final that "After Dennis had won that [14th] frame he stayed on top. I didn't get the run of the balls but he played very grittily." He added "that's snooker. The game can be kind to you and it can be cruel." Taylor remarked that he hadn't seen Higgins "play better for some time. I expected him to lash out but he refused those sort of shots."

In Snooker Scene magazine, Everton wrote that "there was never a hint of flamboyance as [Higgins's] cautious, canny approach emphasised the change in his game which has occurred since he burst open the scene as the game's most impetuous, exciting, attacking talent." Higgins later wrote "I played some magnificent snooker in that final ... I was shattered that I'd lost."

The match finished at 1:09 am, becoming the second-latest finish for a televised snooker final, after the 1985 UK Championship, which finished at 2:14 am and which Taylor also won. The Masters victory was Taylor's first title since the Canadian Masters in November 1985; Higgins's last major title had been the 1983 UK Championship.

The final had an average of 9.2 million viewers on BBC1, peaking at 13.3 million. The most spectators for a match at the tournament was 2,693 for the semi-final between Higgins and Meo, followed by 2,678 for the second session of the final. The match between Francisco and Knowles in the first round attracted the fewest spectators, 896.

== Tournament draw ==
The draw of the tournament is shown below. Numbers in parentheses after the players' names denote the players' seedings, and players in bold denote match winners.

**First round** Best of 9 frames
**Cliff Thorburn (CAN) (1)** | **5**
Rex Williams (ENG) (16) | 1
**Willie Thorne (ENG) (8)** | **5**
Kirk Stevens (CAN) (9) | 3
Tony Knowles (ENG) (5) | 2
**Silvino Francisco (RSA) (12)** | **5**
**Dennis Taylor (NIR) (4)** | **5**
Neal Foulds (ENG) (13) | 2
Steve Davis (ENG) (3) | 2
**Doug Mountjoy (WAL) (14)** | **5**
Jimmy White (ENG) (6) | 4
**Tony Meo (ENG) (11)** | **5**
**Alex Higgins (NIR) (7)** | **5**
Terry Griffiths (WAL) (10) | 4
**Joe Johnson (ENG) (2)** | **5**
Ray Reardon (WAL) (15) | 2

**Quarter-finals**; Best of 9 frames
**Cliff Thorburn (CAN) (1)** | **5**
Willie Thorne (ENG) (8) | 3
Silvino Francisco (RSA) (12) | 3
**Dennis Taylor (NIR) (4)** | **5**
Doug Mountjoy (WAL) (14) | 4
**Tony Meo (ENG) (11)** | **5**
**Alex Higgins (NIR) (7)** | **5**
Joe Johnson (ENG) (2) | 1

**Semi-finals**; Best of 11 frames
Cliff Thorburn (CAN) (1) | 5
**Dennis Taylor (NIR) (4)** | **6**
Tony Meo (ENG) (11) | 2
**Alex Higgins (NIR) (7)** | **6**

**Final**; Best of 17 frames
**Dennis Taylor (NIR) (4)** | **9**
Alex Higgins (NIR) (7) | 8

=== Final: frame scores ===
**Final**; Best of 17 frames. Referee: John Smyth; Wembley Conference Centre, London, England, 1 February 1987. Figures in parentheses are breaks of 50 or more.
| **Dennis Taylor (NIR)** | **9**–8 | Alex Higgins (NIR) |
First session: **63**–37, 16–**89** (56), 49–**69**, **89**–41, **69**–33 (65), 48–**74**, **73**–11; Second session: **60**–40 (60), 22–**66**, **53**–30, 0–**113** (98), 63–**77**, 25–**92** (88), **61**–50, **118**–9 (74), **50**–40, **82**–0
| 74 | Highest break | **98** |
| 3 | 50+ breaks | 3 |

== Century breaks ==
Seven century breaks were made during the tournament.

- 136 – Jimmy White
- 111, 106, 105, 101 – Dennis Taylor
- 108 – Alex Higgins
- 101 – Tony Meo
