= 1982–83 snooker season =

Details
- Duration: 7 July 1982 – 27 May 1983
- Tournaments: 18 (3 ranking events)

Triple Crown winners
- UK Championship: (Wales) Terry Griffiths
- Masters: (Canada) Cliff Thorburn
- World Championship: (England) Steve Davis

The 1982–83 snooker season was a series of snooker tournaments played between 7 July 1982 and 27 May 1983. The following table outlines the results for ranking events and the invitational events.

== New professional players ==
In May 1982, the World Professional Billiards and Snooker Association accepted the applications of six players to become professional: Pascal Burke, Bob Harris, Graham Cripsey, Ian Williamson, Les Dodd and Mick Fisher. There were 13 rejected applications, including those of Barry West, Tony Kearney, Paul Watchorn, and Steve Longworth.

In October, John Campbell, Mike Darrington, Warren King, Wayne Sanderson, and Watchorn were admitted as professionals. Joe O'Boye, Dave Gilbert and Longworth were among several applicants who were refused.

== Calendar ==
Date (Note: Dates use the mm-dd date format.)			Rank	Tournament name	Venue	City	Winner	Runner-up	Score	Reference
07-07	07–09	AUS	NR	Australian Masters	Channel 10 Television Studios	Sydney	(England) Steve Davis	(Australia) Eddie Charlton	(Note: The final was decided on aggregate score over three frames.)	
09-23	09-26	SCO	NR	Scottish Masters	Holiday Inn	Glasgow	(England) Steve Davis	(Northern Ireland) Alex Higgins	9–4	
09–27	10-10	ENG	WR	International Open	Assembly Rooms	Derby	(England) Tony Knowles	(England) David Taylor	9–6	
10-11	10-22	ENG	WR	Professional Players Tournament	La Reserve	Sutton Coldfield	(Wales) Ray Reardon	(England) Jimmy White	10–5	
10-11	10-22	ENG	WR	Professional Players Tournament	International Snooker Club	Aston	(Wales) Ray Reardon	(England) Jimmy White	10–5	
10–23	10–31	ENG	TE	World Team Classic	Hexagon Theatre	Reading	Canada	England	4–2	
11–20	12–04	ENG	NR	UK Championship	Guild Hall	Preston	(Wales) Terry Griffiths	(Northern Ireland) Alex Higgins	16–15	
12–16	12–19	ENG	TE	World Doubles Championship	Crystal Palace	London	(England) Steve Davis (England) Tony Meo	(Wales) Terry Griffiths (Wales) Doug Mountjoy	13–2	
12-??	12-??	ENG	NR	Pot Black	BBC Studios	Birmingham	(England) Steve Davis	(Wales) Ray Reardon	2–0	
01–09	01–16	ENG	NR	The Classic	Spectrum Arena	Warrington	(England) Steve Davis	(Canada) Bill Werbeniuk	9–5	
01–23	01–30	ENG	NR	The Masters	Wembley Conference Centre	London	(Canada) Cliff Thorburn	(Wales) Ray Reardon	9–7	
02–16	02–20	WAL	NR	Welsh Professional Championship	Ebbw Vale Leisure Centre	Ebbw Vale	(Wales) Ray Reardon	(Wales) Doug Mountjoy	9–1	
02–21	02–23	ENG	NR	Tolly Cobbold Classic	Corn Exchange	Ipswich	(England) Steve Davis	(Wales) Terry Griffiths	7–5	
02–28	03–06	ENG	NR	International Masters	Assembly Rooms	Derby	(Wales) Ray Reardon	(England) Jimmy White	9–6	
03–09	03–13	NIR	NR	Irish Professional Championship	Mayfield Leisure Centre	Belfast	(Northern Ireland) Alex Higgins	(Northern Ireland) Dennis Taylor	16–11	
03–22	03–27	IRL	NR	Irish Masters	Goff's	Kill	(England) Steve Davis	(Wales) Ray Reardon	9–2	
04–16	05–02	ENG	WR	World Snooker Championship	Crucible Theatre	Sheffield	(England) Steve Davis	(Canada) Cliff Thorburn	18–6	
05–07	05–14	WAL	NR	Pontins Professional	Pontins	Prestatyn	(Wales) Doug Mountjoy	(Wales) Ray Reardon	9–7	
05–21	05–27	ENG	NR	Pontins Brean Sands	Sands Holiday Village	Burnham-on-Sea	(England) Tony Meo	(South Africa) Silvino Francisco	9–7	

WR = World ranking event
NR = Non-ranking event
TE = Team event

== Official rankings ==
The top 16 of the world rankings, these players automatically played in the final rounds of the world ranking events and were invited for the Masters.

No.	Ch.	Name
1	▲	(Wales) Ray Reardon
2	▲	(Northern Ireland) Alex Higgins
3	▼	(Canada) Cliff Thorburn
4	▼	(England) Steve Davis
5	▲	(Australia) Eddie Charlton
6	▲	(Canada) Kirk Stevens
7	▼	(Wales) Doug Mountjoy
8	▼	(England) David Taylor
9	Steady	(Canada) Bill Werbeniuk
10	▲	(England) Jimmy White
11	▲	(South Africa) Perrie Mans
12	▲	(England) John Spencer
13	▼	(Northern Ireland) Dennis Taylor
14	▼	(Wales) Terry Griffiths
15	▲	(England) Tony Knowles
16	▲	(England) Willie Thorne
