= Bill Werbeniuk =

Canadian snooker player

Personal information
- Nickname: Big Bill
- Born: 14 January 1947 Winnipeg, Manitoba, Canada
- Died: 20 January 2003 (aged 56) Vancouver, British Columbia, Canada

Sport
- Country: Canada
- Sport: Snooker
- Professional: 1973–1992
- Highest ranking: 8 (1983/84)
- Best ranking finish: Quarter-final (x6)

William Alexander Werbeniuk (/ˌwɜːrbɛˈnɪk/ WURR-ben-IK; 14 January 1947 – 20 January 2003) was a Canadian professional snooker and pool player. Recognisable for his girth, he was nicknamed "Big Bill". Werbeniuk was a four-time snooker World Championship quarter-finalist and also a snooker UK Championship semi-finalist, reaching a career high world ranking of #8 for the 1983–84 season.

== Early life ==
Werbeniuk was born on 14 January 1947 in Winnipeg. His paternal grandfather had emigrated to Canada from Ukraine; his father, according to Werbeniuk, "was one of the biggest fences in Canada" and "committed armed robberies, peddled drugs, every larceny in the language." His father also owned Pop's Billiards on Logan Avenue in Winnipeg, where Werbeniuk began playing snooker as a child. Werbeniuk spent a portion of his youth travelling with Cliff Thorburn and playing pool for money.

== Career ==
Werbeniuk won the Amateur Championship in 1973, with a 16–15 victory against Robert Paquette after being 12–15 behind. This qualified him for the North American Amateur Championship. He won the North American Amateur Championship by defeating Cliff Thorburn 26–22, winning five of the last six frames after the pair were level at 21–21.

His playing record included a 9–8 quarter-final loss to John Pulman in the 1975 Canadian Open and quarter-final losses in the 1978 and 1979 World Championships to Ray Reardon and John Virgo respectively. He reached the semi-finals of the UK Championships (when it opened to non-UK based residents) but lost 9–3 to the reigning world champion Terry Griffiths. He suffered a third World quarter-final defeat to Reardon in 1981 by 13–10.

In the 1983 Lada Classic, Bill reached his first major final, but was beaten by Steve Davis 9–5. Werbeniuk again reached the quarter-finals of the World Championships, in the same year, losing 13–11 to Alex Higgins, and reached his second major final in the summer, losing 7–3 to compatriot Cliff Thorburn in the Winfield Masters in Australia.

=== Alcohol consumption ===
Werbeniuk was noted for the copious amounts of alcohol he consumed before and during matches – at least six pints before a match and then one pint for each frame. In total, he drank between 40 and 50 pints of lager per day. Doctors advised Werbeniuk to drink alcohol to counteract a familial benign essential tremor. Later in his career he also took propranolol, a beta blocker, to cope with the effects of his alcohol consumption on his heart.

Werbeniuk was reported to have successfully claimed the cost of six pints of lager before every match as a tax deductible expense.

Some of Werbeniuk's alleged feats of drinking include: 76 cans of lager during a game with John Spencer in Australia in the 1970s; 43 pints of lager in a snooker match/drinking contest against Scotsman Eddie Sinclair in which, after Sinclair had passed out following his 42nd pint, Werbeniuk was reported to say "I'm away to the bar now for a proper drink"; 28 pints of lager and 16 whiskies over the course of 11 frames during a match against Nigel Bond, in January 1990 – after which Werbeniuk then consumed an entire bottle of Scotch to "drown his sorrows" after losing the match.

=== Split trouser incident ===
A memorable incident occurred during a televised match against Dennis Taylor in the World Team Tournament. Werbeniuk tried to stretch across the table, but due to his size was having some difficulty. Eventually he split his trousers. The ripping noise it made caused many in the audience, including his opponent, to laugh out loud.

=== Trick shot ===
In another incident, playing against Joe Johnson, Werbeniuk made what the announcer termed the "pot of the century" when he potted a long red by jumping the cue ball so that it bounced in front of and over an interposing red, knocking the object red in. Later in the match, he had an unusual fluke, when he missed a simple brown to the top corner, but it cannoned out of the pocket, off the opposite cushion and into the centre pocket on the same side.

=== Use of propranolol ===
Werbeniuk was ranked 8th in the world in 1983 and reached the quarter-finals of the World Snooker Championship four times before propranolol was banned in snooker competition, as it was classified as a performance-enhancing drug by the International Olympic Committee, the anti-doping rules of which were adopted by World Snooker. Werbeniuk said that his use was medicinal only and under doctor's orders, but he was fined and sanctioned.

His career effectively over, he returned to Vancouver, where he lived with his mother and brother. A bankruptcy order was filed against him in 1991 and he lived on disability benefits.

== Death ==
Werbeniuk died of heart failure on 20 January 2003, aged 56.

== Performance and rankings timeline ==
Tournament	1973/ 74	1974/ 75	1975/ 76	1976/ 77	1977/ 78	1978/ 79	1979/ 80	1980/ 81	1981/ 82	1982/ 83	1983/ 84	1984/ 85	1985/ 86	1986/ 87	1987/ 88	1988/ 89	1989/ 90	1990/ 91	1991/ 92
Ranking	No ranking system			14	17	12	12	10	9	9	8	14	17	24	33	47	UR	UR	146
Ranking tournaments
Grand Prix (Note: The event was also called the Professional Players Tournament (1982/93–1983/1984))	Tournament Not Held									QF	2R	1R	1R	1R	2R	WD	A	A	LQ
UK Championship	Tournament Not Held				Non-Ranking Event							1R	1R	1R	1R	LQ	A	A	LQ
Classic	Tournament Not Held						Non-Ranking Event				1R	1R	3R	2R	1R	WD	A	A	LQ
British Open (Note: The event was also called the British Gold Cup (1979/1980), Yamaha Organs Trophy (1980/1981) and International Masters (1981/1982–1983/1984))	Tournament Not Held						Non-Ranking Event					1R	QF	1R	LQ	WD	A	LQ	LQ
World Championship	2R	2R	2R	A	QF	QF	2R	QF	2R	QF	2R	2R	1R	LQ	1R	WD	LQ	LQ	WD
Non-ranking tournaments
The Masters	NH	1R	A	A	A	A	A	A	A	QF	1R	1R	A	A	A	A	A	A	A
Irish Masters (Note: The event was also called the Benson & Hedges Ireland Tournament (1974/1975–1976/1977))	NH	A	A	A	A	A	A	A	A	A	1R	A	A	A	A	A	A	A	A
Matchroom League (Note: The event was also called the Professional Snooker League (1983/1984))	Tournament Not Held										RR	Not Held		A	A	A	A	A	A
Former ranking tournaments
Canadian Masters (Note: The event was also called the Canadian Open (1978/1979–1980/1981))	NH	Non-Ranking							Tournament Not Held				Non-Ranking			LQ	Not Held		
International Open (Note: The event was also called the Goya Matchroom Trophy (1985/1986))	Tournament Not Held								NR	2R	1R	1R	2R	1R	2R	LQ	A	Not Held	
Former non-ranking tournaments
Norwich Union Open	A	QF	Tournament Not Held																
World Matchplay Championship	Not Held			QF	Tournament Not Held														
Holsten Lager International	Tournament Not Held					1R	Tournament Not Held												
Canadian Masters (Note: The event was also called the Canadian Open (1978/1979–1980/1981))	NH	1R	QF	QF	QF	2R	QF	A	Tournament Not Held				A	A	A	R	Not Held		
Padmore Super Crystalate	Tournament Not Held						QF	Tournament Not Held											
Pontins Camber Sands	Tournament Not Held						QF	Tournament Not Held											
International Open (Note: The event was also called the Goya Matchroom Trophy (1985/1986))	Tournament Not Held								1R	Ranking Event								Not Held	
UK Championship	Tournament Not Held				A	A	SF	2R	QF	A	A	Ranking Event							
Classic	Tournament Not Held						A	A	A	F	Ranking Event								
Tolly Cobbold Classic	Tournament Not Held					A	A	A	A	SF	A	Tournament Not Held							
British Open (Note: The event was also called the British Gold Cup (1979/1980), Yamaha Organs Trophy (1980/1981) and International Masters (1981/1982–1983/1984))	Tournament Not Held						RR	RR	RR	RR	RR	Ranking Event							
New Zealand Masters	Tournament Not Held										W	QF	Not Held			A	A	Not Held	
Australian Masters (Note: The event was also called the Hong Kong Open (1989/1990) and Australian Open (1994/1995))	Tournament Not Held						A	A	A	A	F	1R	1R	A	A	NH	A	Not Held	
Pot Black	A	A	A	A	A	A	A	A	A	A	A	1R	QF	Tournament Not Held					

Performance Table Legend
LQ	lost in the qualifying draw	#R	lost in the early rounds of the tournament (WR = Wildcard round, RR = Round robin)	QF	lost in the quarter-finals
SF	lost in the semi-finals	F	lost in the final	W	won the tournament
DNQ	did not qualify for the tournament	A	did not participate in the tournament	WD	withdrew from the tournament

NH / Not Held	means an event was not held.
NR / Non-Ranking Event	means an event is/was no longer a ranking event.
R / Ranking Event	means an event is/was a ranking event.

== Career finals ==
=== Non-ranking finals: 4 (2 titles) ===
Outcome	No.	Year	Championship	Opponent in the final	Score	Ref.
Winner	1.	1973	Canadian Professional Championship			
Runner-up	1.	1983	The Classic	(England) Steve Davis	5–9	
Winner	2.	1983	New Zealand Masters	(Wales) Doug Mountjoy	1–0	
Runner-up	2.	1983	Australian Masters	(Canada) Cliff Thorburn	3–7	

=== Team finals: 4 (1 title) ===
Outcome	No.	Year	Championship	Team/partner	Opponent(s) in the final	Score	Ref.
Runner-up	1.	1980	World Challenge Cup	Canada	Wales	5–8	
Winner	1.	1982	World Cup	Canada	England	4–2	
Runner-up	2.	1986	World Cup (2)	Canada	(Republic of Ireland) Ireland "A"	7–9	
Runner-up	3.	1987	World Cup (3)	Canada	(Republic of Ireland) Ireland "A"	2–9	

=== Amateur finals: 7 (5 titles) ===
Outcome	No.	Year	Championship	Opponent in the final	Score	Ref.
Winner	1.	1973	Canadian Amateur Championship	(Canada) Robert Paquette	16–15	
Winner	2.	1973	North American Amateur Championship	(Canada) Cliff Thorburn	26–22	
Winner	3.	1974	North American Amateur Championship (2)			
Runner-up	1.	1975	Canadian Amateur Championship	(Canada) Cliff Thorburn	1–11	
Winner	4.	1975	North American Amateur Championship (3)	(Canada) Cliff Thorburn	11–9	
Runner-up	2.	1976	Canadian Amateur Championship (2)	(Canada) Cliff Thorburn	2–9	
Winner	5.	1976	North American Amateur Championship (4)	(Canada) Cliff Thorburn	11–10	
