= 1972 Marrickville Professional =

Professional snooker tournament in Australia

Tournament information
- Dates: August 1972
- Venue: Marrickville RSL
- City: Marrickville
- Country: Australia
- Highest break: Eddie Charlton (AUS), 110

Final
- Champion: Eddie Charlton (AUS)
- Runner-up: Alex Higgins (NIR)
- Score: 19–17

The 1972 Marrickville Professional was a non-ranking professional snooker tournament held in Marrickville, Australia in August 1972. It featured three professional players: Alex Higgins, John Pulman, and Eddie Charlton. Charlton eliminated Pulman to meet Higgins in the final, which Charlton won 19–17.

Charlton won the first six frames of the final. Higgins took the next session 5–1, and Charlton won five of six frames in the third session to lead 12–6. The next two sessions were won 5–1 by Higgins to lead 16–14. The players were level at 16–16 before Charlton won frame 33. Higgins levelled the match again, but Charlton won the next two frames to secure victory. Charlton praised Higgins as a "bold player", and Higgins remarked that Charlton's "steadiness proved my downfall".

Higgins played two challenge matches against Paddy Morgan prior to the start of the tournament. He won 4–3 at Helensburg Workers' Club. but lost 4–5 at Lithgow Workers' Club. Charlton took a 4–2 lead against Pulman after their first session, and led 9–5 after to sessions, but Pulman went on to level at 10–10 before Charlton won the deciding frame.

Charlton compiled the highest break of the tournament, 110, during the final, although Higgins made a 136 break against Morgan.

== Results ==
Results are shown below.

Challenge matches
Player	Score	Player
Alex Higgins (NIR)	4–3	Paddy Morgan (AUS)
Alex Higgins (NIR)	4–5	Paddy Morgan (AUS)

Playoff		Final
		Alex Higgins (NIR)	17
Eddie Charlton (AUS)	11	Eddie Charlton (AUS)	19
John Pulman (ENG)	10
