= 1980 British Gold Cup =

Tournament information
- Dates: 24–28 February 1980
- Venue: Assembly Rooms
- City: Derby
- Country: England
- Format: Non-ranking event
- Total prize fund: £9,000
- Winner's share: £4,000
- Highest break: (Northern Ireland) Alex Higgins (135)

Final
- Champion: (Northern Ireland) Alex Higgins
- Runner-up: (Wales) Ray Reardon
- Score: 5–1

The 1980 British Gold Cup was a non-ranking snooker tournament, that was held between 24 and 28 February 1980 at the Assembly Rooms in Derby, England.

== Main draw ==
=== Group 1 ===
Player 1	Score	Player 2	Date
(England) John Virgo	3–0	(England) John Pulman	
(England) John Virgo	0–3	(England) Willie Thorne	
(England) John Pulman	1–2	(England) Willie Thorne	
(Northern Ireland) Dennis Taylor	3–0	(England) Willie Thorne	
(Northern Ireland) Dennis Taylor	3–0	(England) John Virgo	
(Northern Ireland) Dennis Taylor	3–0	(England) John Pulman	

=== Group 2 ===
Player 1	Score	Player 2	Date
(England) John Spencer	2–1	(Wales) Doug Mountjoy	
(Wales) Doug Mountjoy	2–1	(England) Graham Miles	
(England) John Spencer	0–3	(England) Graham Miles	
(England) Graham Miles	2–1	(England) Tony Meo	
(England) John Spencer	0–3	(England) Tony Meo	
(Wales) Doug Mountjoy	1–2	(England) Tony Meo	

Single frame play-off

Player 1	Score	Player 2	Date
(England) Graham Miles	19–66	(England) Tony Meo	

=== Group 3 ===
Player 1	Score	Player 2	Date
(Republic of Ireland) Patsy Fagan	1–2	(England) David Taylor	
(Northern Ireland) Alex Higgins	1–2	(England) David Taylor	
(Northern Ireland) Alex Higgins	3–0	(Wales) Terry Griffiths	
(Northern Ireland) Alex Higgins	2–1	(Republic of Ireland) Patsy Fagan	
(Wales) Terry Griffiths	3–0	(Republic of Ireland) Patsy Fagan	
(Wales) Terry Griffiths	3–0	(England) David Taylor	

=== Group 4 ===
Player 1	Score	Player 2	Date
(Canada) Bill Werbeniuk	3–0	(England) Pat Houlihan	
(Canada) Bill Werbeniuk	2–1	(England) Fred Davis	
(Wales) Ray Reardon	3–0	(England) Fred Davis	
(Wales) Ray Reardon	3–0	(England) Pat Houlihan	
(Wales) Ray Reardon	2–1	(Canada) Bill Werbeniuk	
(England) Fred Davis	2–1	(England) Pat Houlihan	

=== Semi-finals ===
Player 1	Score	Player 2	Date
(Wales) Ray Reardon	4–3	(Northern Ireland) Dennis Taylor	
(Northern Ireland) Alex Higgins	4–0	(England) Tony Meo	

=== Final ===
Final: Best of 9 frames. Referee: Assembly Rooms, Derby, England. 28 February 1980.
Alex Higgins; Northern Ireland	5–1	Ray Reardon; Wales
12–109 (77), 70–45, 132–1 (132), 104–8 (65), 66–37, 92–37
132	Highest break	77
1	Century breaks	0
2	50+ breaks	1

== Qualifying ==
=== Group 1 ===
Player 1	Score	Player 2	Date
(Wales) Cliff Wilson	3–0	(England) Mark Wildman	
(England) Graham Miles	3–0	(England) Tony Meo	
(England) Graham Miles	2–1	(England) Mark Wildman	
(England) Graham Miles	2–1	(Wales) Cliff Wilson	
(England) Tony Meo	3–0	(England) Mark Wildman	
(England) Tony Meo	2–1	(Wales) Cliff Wilson	

=== Group 2 ===
Player 1	Score	Player 2	Date
(Republic of Ireland) Patsy Fagan	1–2	(England) Jimmy White	
(England) John Pulman	1–2	(England) Jimmy White	
(England) Pat Houlihan	1–2	(England) Jimmy White	
(Republic of Ireland) Patsy Fagan	0–3	(England) John Pulman	
(Republic of Ireland) Patsy Fagan	1–2	(England) Pat Houlihan	
(England) John Pulman	1–2	(England) Pat Houlihan	

=== Group 3 ===
Player 1	Score	Player 2	Date
(England) Willie Thorne	2–1	(England) Tony Knowles	
(England) Willie Thorne	2–1	(England) Joe Johnson	
(England) Tony Knowles	3–0	(England) Joe Johnson	
(England) Mike Hallett	3–0	(England) Joe Johnson	
(England) Willie Thorne	1–2	(England) Mike Hallett	
(England) Mike Hallett	2–1	(England) Tony Knowles	

=== Group 4 ===
Player 1	Score	Player 2	Date
(England) John Spencer	3–0	(England) Jim Meadowcroft	
(England) John Spencer	2–1	(England) Dave Martin	
(England) Jim Meadowcroft	2–1	(England) Dave Martin	
(England) John Spencer	1–2	(England) Ray Edmonds	
(England) Ray Edmonds	2–1	(England) Jim Meadowcroft	
(England) Ray Edmonds	2–1	(England) Dave Martin	
