= 1979 Tolly Cobbold Classic =

Tolly Cobbold Classic
Tournament information
- Dates: 20–21 February 1979
- Venue: Corn Exchange
- City: Ipswich
- Country: England
- Organisation: WPBSA
- Format: Non-ranking event
- Winner's share: £600

Final
- Champion: (Northern Ireland) Alex Higgins
- Runner-up: (Wales) Ray Reardon
- Score: 5–4

The 1979 Tolly Cobbold Classic was a professional invitational snooker tournament which took place between 20 and 21 February 1979 at the Corn Exchange, Ipswich, England.

Four professionals played in a round-robin group, with the top two progressing to the final. Alex Higgins won the tournament by defeating Ray Reardon 5–4 in the final.

== Main draw ==
=== Round-Robin ===
Player 1	Score	Player 2
(Northern Ireland) Alex Higgins	4–0	(Wales) Ray Reardon
(Wales) Ray Reardon	4–0	(England) Steve Davis
(Wales) Ray Reardon	3–1	(Wales) Doug Mountjoy
(England) Steve Davis	2–2	(Wales) Doug Mountjoy
(England) Steve Davis	4–0	(Northern Ireland) Alex Higgins
(Northern Ireland) Alex Higgins	2–2	(Wales) Doug Mountjoy

=== Final ===
Best of 9 frames
(Northern Ireland) Alex Higgins	5
(Wales) Ray Reardon	4
