= 1980 Pontins Camber Sands =

Tournament information
- Dates: 10–17 May 1980
- Venue: Camber Sands Holiday Village
- City: Rye
- Country: England
- Organisation: WPBSA
- Format: Non-ranking event
- Winner's share: £2,000
- Highest break: Alex Higgins (NIR) 111

Final
- Champion: Alex Higgins (NIR)
- Runner-up: Dennis Taylor (NIR)
- Score: 9–7

The 1980 Pontins Camber Sands Championship was a professional invitational snooker tournament which took place in May 1980 in Rye, England.

Laid out similarly to the Pontins Professional championships, the tournament featured eight professional players. The quarter-final matches were contested over the best of 7 frames, the semi-final matches over the best of 9 frames, and the final over the best of 17 frames.

Alex Higgins won the event, beating Dennis Taylor 9–7 in the final after Taylor had taken a 5–0 lead. Higgins received £2,000 as winner, with Taylor taking £1,500 as runner-up.

== Main draw ==
Quarter-finals; Best of 7 frames
(Northern Ireland) Alex Higgins	4
(Canada) Bill Werbeniuk	2
(England) Graham Miles	4
(England) John Pulman	0
(Northern Ireland) Dennis Taylor	4
(Canada) Cliff Thorburn	3
(Wales) Doug Mountjoy	4
(Canada) Kirk Stevens	1

Semi-finals; Best of 9 frames
(Northern Ireland) Alex Higgins	5
(England) Graham Miles	1
(Northern Ireland) Dennis Taylor	5
(Wales) Doug Mountjoy	3

Final; Best of 17 frames
(Northern Ireland) Alex Higgins	9
(Northern Ireland) Dennis Taylor	7
