= 1980 Masters (snooker) =

Professional non-ranking snooker tournament, Feb 1980

1980 Benson & Hedges Masters
Tournament information
- Dates: 5–9 February 1980
- Venue: Wembley Conference Centre
- City: London
- Country: England
- Format: Non-ranking event
- Total prize fund: £14,000
- Winner's share: £4,500
- Highest break: Terry Griffiths (WAL) (131)

Final
- Champion: Terry Griffiths (WAL)
- Runner-up: Alex Higgins (NIR)
- Score: 9–5

The 1980 Masters (officially the 1980 Benson & Hedges Masters) was a professional non-ranking snooker tournament that took place from 5 to 9 February 1980 at the Wembley Conference Centre in London, England. It was organised by representatives of the sponsors, cigarette brand Benson & Hedges, and sanctioned by the World Professional Billiards and Snooker Association. Ten players were invited to participate, including debutants Terry Griffiths and John Virgo.

Perrie Mans was the defending champion, having defeated Alex Higgins 8–4 in the 1979 final. Mans failed to retain his title, losing 4–8 to Higgins in the quarter-finals.

Griffiths won the title by defeating Higgins 8–5 in the final, after they had been level at 4–4 following the first session. Griffiths made the highest break of the tournament, 131, in the 13th frame of the final to clinch victory. An audience of 2,323 people attended the final session of the match, which was a British record at the time.

The tournament carried a total prize fund of £14,000, with £4,500 going to the winner. Matches from 7 February onwards received television coverage on BBC2, and parts of the final were broadcast on BBC1's Grandstand.

== Overview ==
The 1980 Masters was staged at the Wembley Conference Centre in London, with ten invited players and was the sixth edition of the Masters after its establishment in 1975. It was organised by representatives of the sponsors, cigarette brand Benson & Hedges, and sanctioned by the World Professional Billiards and Snooker Association. Terry Griffiths, the reigning World Champion, and John Virgo, who had won the 1979 UK Championship, were invited to participate in the Masters for the first time.

Perrie Mans was the defending champion, having defeated Alex Higgins 8–4 in the 1979 final. Ray Reardon was the bookmakers' pre-tournament favourite to win, with odds of 7/2, and Griffiths was second-favourite.

There was daily coverage on BBC2 from 7 February onwards. Part of the final was televised as part of Grandstand on BBC1, with commentary by Ted Lowe, Jack Karnehm and John Pulman.

=== Prize fund ===
The winner's prize was £4,500 from a total prize fund of £14,000. The breakdown of prize money, where known, is shown below. £10,000 would have been awarded to the first player making a maximum break.

- Winner: £4,500
- Runner-up: £2,500
- Semi-finals: £1,500
- Total: £14,000

== Summary ==
=== First round ===
First round matches were played on 5 and 6 February as the best-of-nine frames. Fred Davis, in his 50th year as a professional player, won the first frame against Alex Higgins. Higgins won the second frame, and, after Davis had twice failed to pot the final pink in frame three, Higgins fluked it and then potted the black for 2–1. Higgins advanced to a 4–1 lead. In the sixth frame, he led by 48 points. Davis then made a 50 break, but failed to pot the final black, leaving an easy opportunity that Higgins took to seal a 5–1 win.

John Virgo made a 41 break at his first visit to the table in the opening frame against Cliff Thorburn, and went on to win the frame. The lead changed three times, and eventually Thorburn made the highest break of the match, 71, in the eighth frame to secure a 5–3 win.

=== Quarter-finals ===
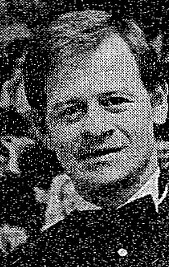
Alex Higgins (pictured in 1988) reached the Masters final for the third consecutive year.

The quarter-finals were played from 5 to 7 February as the best-of-nine frames. In a replay of the 1979 final, Higgins faced Perrie Mans. Mans won the first frame, but Higgins won the next five to reverse the outcome from the previous year. The match report in The Daily Telegraph called it a "blistering victory ... that left [the crowd] gasping". Ronnie Harper of Belfast Telegraph said Higgins's performance against Mans "fringed on the unbelievable ... a power packed display of potting and cueball control that television audiences have never seen before."

Dennis Taylor took a 2–0 lead against Ray Reardon, and led 3–1 at the end of their first session. Reardon made a break of 59 in the fourth frame, which was followed with a 61 by Taylor; after both missed chances to win, Taylor won the frame. Reardon left few chances for Taylor as he took the first four frames of the second session to wrap up a 5–3 win.

John Spencer lost the first two frames against Eddie Charlton, but went on to win 5–2. He won the last three frames by a 282–40 point margin, with breaks including 58, 50 and 54. Terry Griffiths beat Thorburn 5–3 after the pair had been all square at 2–2 after their first session, and Thorburn had produced a break of 96 to win the first frame of the second session. Griffiths later described Thorburn as "curiously careless" during the match. Thorburn reflected that Griffiths "was playing very well and he had a slow, even pace that he stuck to all the time", while his own play was often "jerky".

=== Semi-finals ===
The semi-finals were held on 8 February as the best-of-nine frames across two sessions. Higgins took a 3–1 lead against Reardon in their first session, although Everton thought Higgins's play was "edgy and erratic". After Higgins had added the fifth frame, Reardon made a break of 93 to win frame six. In the seventh frame, Reardon was 15 points ahead with only the last three colours remaining when Higgins fluked potting the blue ball when escaping from a snooker and went on to secure the frame for a 5–2 victory.

Griffiths whitewashed Spencer. Everton described his play in the first session as "formidable by any standards". He completed his win with a break on 100 in the first frame of the second session. After the match, Griffiths commented: "That is the best I have played since winning the world title. But I can still play better."

=== Final ===
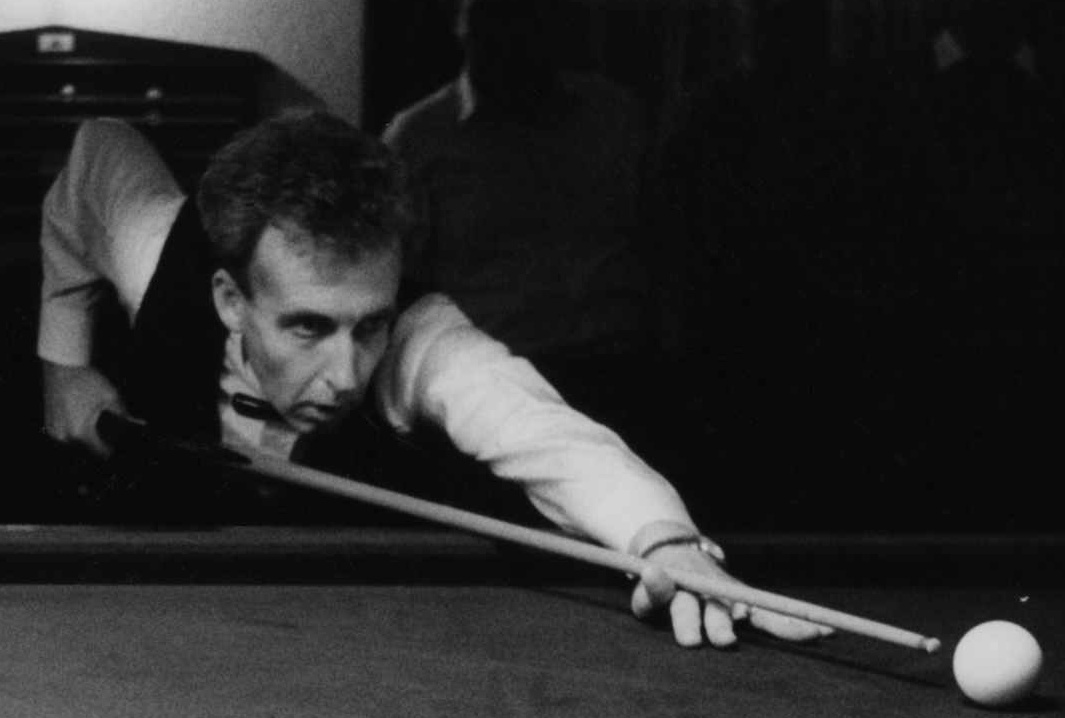
Terry Griffiths (pictured in 1991) won the Masters title at his first attempt.

The final between Griffiths and Higgins was played on 9 February as the best-of-17 frames across two sessions. John Street was the referee. Higgins was a few minutes late, and said that this was because he had mislaid his bow tie and needed to borrow one. In his customary manner, he removed the bow tie at the start of the match. Griffiths won the first two frames, each following a miss by Higgins: what Everton described as an "easy pink" in the first frame, and a black from its spot in the second frame. A break of 81, completed in just over four minutes, gave Higgins the third frame. Higgins drew level at 2–2 after potting the re-spotted black after the fourth frame ended in a tie. Griffiths moved into a 3–2 lead with a 77 break in frame five. After Higgins capitalised following missed pots by Griffiths in the next two frames to lead 4–3, Griffiths levelled the match at 4–4, taking a 71-point lead and winning the frame 102–25.

In the interval between frames, Higgins offered to split the prize money from the final equally. Griffiths accepted, reasoning that "In this case, it really did not matter because we both wanted to win." In the first frame of the second session, Higgins was 52 ahead when he accidentally potted the brown ball along with the yellow ball that he intended to pot. There were three reds left on the table, which would have meant only 51 points available, but as Griffiths was snookered, he was awarded a free ball and went on to clear the table, winning the frame on the black. In the tenth frame, Griffiths led after making a 58 break, but Higgins responded with a 70 break and took the frame. Griffiths moved into an 8–5 lead after mistakes from Higgins in the next three frames; the 13th frame was won on a re-spotted black. Griffiths compiled a break of 131, the highest of the tournament, to win frame fourteen and take the match 9–5. The attendance of 2,323 was a record for a snooker match in Britain. The match report in The Daily Telegraph described the contest as "spellbinding entertainment".

== Main draw ==
The draw for the tournament is shown below. The match winners are shown in bold.

**First round** Best of 9 frames
Fred Davis (ENG)	1
**Alex Higgins (NIR)**	**5**
**Cliff Thorburn (CAN)**	**5**
John Virgo (ENG)	3

**Quarter-finals**; Best of 9 frames
Perrie Mans (RSA)	1
**Alex Higgins (NIR)**	**5**
**Ray Reardon (WAL)**	**5**
Dennis Taylor (NIR)	3
Eddie Charlton (AUS)	2
**John Spencer (ENG)**	**5**
**Terry Griffiths (WAL)**	**5**
Cliff Thorburn (CAN)	3

**Semi-finals**; Best of 9 frames
**Alex Higgins (NIR)**	**5**
Ray Reardon (WAL)	2
John Spencer (ENG)	0
**Terry Griffiths (WAL)**	**5**

**Final**; Best of 17 frames
Alex Higgins (NIR)	5
**Terry Griffiths (WAL)**	**9**

== Final: details and frame scores ==
Final
Best of 17 frames. Referee: John Street; Wembley Conference Centre, London, England, 9 February 1980. Numbers in parentheses are breaks of 50 or more
Terry Griffiths (WAL)	**9**–5	Alex Higgins (NIR)
First session: **67**–39, **73**–30 (73), 4–**81** (81), 61–**68**, **104**–15 (77), 61–**67** (Griffiths 52), 54–**55**, **102**–25; Second session: **63**–61 (Griffiths 53), 58–**70** (Griffiths 58, Higgins 70), **75**–49, **117**–3 (51), **67**–60, **131**–0 (131)
**131**	Highest break	81
**1**	Century breaks	0
**6**	50+ breaks	1

== Century breaks ==
The following century breaks were made during the tournament:

- 131, 100 – Terry Griffiths
