= Tolly Cobbold Classic =

Snooker tournament

Tournament information
- Venue: Corn Exchange
- Location: Ipswich
- Country: England
- Established: 1979
- Organisation(s): World Professional Billiards and Snooker Association
- Format: Non-ranking event
- Final year: 1984
- Final champion: (England) Steve Davis

The Tolly Cobbold Classic was a non-ranking snooker tournament staged between 1979 and 1984. It was held at the Corn Exchange in Ipswich and sponsored by local brewers Tolly Cobbold. It is not to be confused with the Classic ranking event.

== History ==
Tolly Cobbold began a four-man tournament in Corn Exchange, Ipswich in 1978, and with television coverage by Anglia TV the Tolly Cobbold Classic began in 1979 at the same location.

The event used three different formats during its history. In 1979 and 1981 there were two groups of four, with the winner of the groups advancing to the final. In 1980 only four players participated in a round-robin group, with the top 2 players advancing to the final. Between 1982 and 1984 the tournament was converted to a knock-out format with eight players. After the 1984 event Tolly Cobbold decided to sponsor the English Professional Championship instead, and the event was abandoned.

== Winners ==
Year	Winner	Runner-up	Final score	Season
1979	(Northern Ireland) Alex Higgins	(Wales) Ray Reardon	5–4	1978/79
1980	(Northern Ireland) Alex Higgins	(Northern Ireland) Dennis Taylor	5–4	1979/80
1981	(England) Graham Miles	(Canada) Cliff Thorburn	5–1	1980/81
1982	(England) Steve Davis	(Northern Ireland) Dennis Taylor	8–3	1981/82
1983	(England) Steve Davis	(Wales) Terry Griffiths	7–5	1982/83
1984	(England) Steve Davis	(England) Tony Knowles	8–2	1983/84
