= 1989 Irish Masters =

Irish Masters
Tournament information
- Dates: 28 March – 2 April 1989
- Venue: Goffs
- City: Kill
- Country: Ireland
- Organisation: WPBSA
- Format: Non-Ranking event
- Total prize fund: £135,000
- Winner's share: £32,000
- Highest break: (Scotland) Stephen Hendry (136)

Final
- Champion: (Northern Ireland) Alex Higgins
- Runner-up: (Scotland) Stephen Hendry
- Score: 9–8

The 1989 Irish Masters was the fifteenth edition of the professional invitational snooker tournament, which took place from 28 March to 2 April 1989. The tournament was played at Goffs in Kill, County Kildare, and featured twelve professional players.

Alex Higgins won the title for the second time, beating Stephen Hendry 9–8 in the final. This was the last professional title of Higgins' career.

== Main draw ==
Round 1 Best of 9 frames
(Northern Ireland) Alex Higgins	5
(Canada) Cliff Thorburn	4
(England) John Parrott	5
(Northern Ireland) Dennis Taylor	1
(Wales) Terry Griffiths	5
(Northern Ireland) Jack McLaughlin	4
(England) Mike Hallett	5
(England) Tony Knowles	0

Quarter-finals; Best of 9 frames
(Northern Ireland) Alex Higgins	5
(England) Neal Foulds	2
(England) John Parrott	5
(England) Jimmy White	1
(Scotland) Stephen Hendry	5
(Wales) Terry Griffiths	2
(England) Steve Davis	5
(England) Mike Hallett	4

Semi-finals; Best of 11 frames
(Northern Ireland) Alex Higgins	6
(England) John Parrott	4
(Scotland) Stephen Hendry	6
(England) Steve Davis	4

Final; Best of 17 frames
(Northern Ireland) Alex Higgins	9
(Scotland) Stephen Hendry	8

== Final ==
Final: Best of 17 frames. Referee: John Street. Goffs, Kildare, Ireland, 2 April 1989.
Alex Higgins; Northern Ireland	9–8	Stephen Hendry; Scotland
55-64; 44-68; 7-111(62); 1-129(105); 88(68)-30; 28-111(70); 79-20; 68-18; 101-7; 77-45; 62-15; 14-109(109); 45-55; 33-74; 86(54)-22; 66-8; 67(62)-21
68	Highest break	109
0	Century breaks	2
3	50+ breaks	4
