= 1980 Tolly Cobbold Classic =

Tolly Cobbold Classic
Tournament information
- Dates: February 1980
- Venue: Corn Exchange
- City: Ipswich
- Country: England
- Organisation: WPBSA
- Format: Non-Ranking event
- Highest break: Alex Higgins (NIR) (114)

Final
- Champion: Alex Higgins (NIR)
- Runner-up: Dennis Taylor (NIR)
- Score: 5–4

The 1980 Tolly Cobbold Classic was the second edition of the professional invitational snooker tournament, which took place in February 1980. The tournament was played at the Corn Exchange in Ipswich, and featured four professional players competing in a round-robin; the two players at the top of the group contested the final, and a play-off was held to determine the third-placed player.

Alex Higgins won the title for the second time in succession, beating Dennis Taylor 5–4 in the final.

== Group phase ==
All matches in the group phase were played over four frames. Results were as follows.

- (Northern Ireland) Alex Higgins 4–0 Dennis Taylor (Northern Ireland)
- (Northern Ireland) Alex Higgins 3–1 John Virgo (England)
- (Northern Ireland) Alex Higgins 2–2 Terry Griffiths (Wales)
- (Northern Ireland) Dennis Taylor 4–0 John Virgo (England)
- (Northern Ireland) Dennis Taylor 3–1 Terry Griffiths (Wales)
- (England) John Virgo 3–1 Terry Griffiths (Wales)

== Final ==
Final; Best of 9 frames
(Northern Ireland) Alex Higgins	5
(Northern Ireland) Dennis Taylor	4

== Third-place play-off ==
Griffiths and Virgo played off for third place.

Play-off; Best of 3 frames
(Wales) Terry Griffiths	2
(England) John Virgo	1
