= 1989 Hong Kong Gold Cup =

Hong Kong Gold Cup
Tournament information
- Dates: 2–3 September 1989
- Venue: Queen Elizabeth Stadium
- City: Wan Chai
- Country: Hong Kong
- Organisation: HKBSCC
- Format: Non-ranking event
- Winner's share: £25,000

Final
- Champion: (England) Steve Davis
- Runner-up: (Northern Ireland) Alex Higgins
- Score: 6–3

The 1989 Hong Kong Gold Cup was a professional non-ranking snooker tournament that took place in September 1989 in Hong Kong.

The tournament was a three-man tournament featuring Steve Davis, Alex Higgins and Jimmy White, each of whom played each other in a round robin match with the two best players advancing to the final, where Davis defeated Higgins 6–3.

== Results ==
=== Group ===
Table

| POS | Player | MP | MW | ML | FW | FL | FD | Pts |
|---|---|---|---|---|---|---|---|---|
| 1 | (Northern Ireland) Alex Higgins | 2 | 2 | 0 | 6 | 4 | +2 | 2 |
| 2 | (England) Steve Davis | 2 | 1 | 1 | 5 | 4 | +1 | 1 |
| 3 | (England) Jimmy White | 2 | 0 | 2 | 3 | 6 | –3 | 0 |

Results:

- (Northern Ireland) Alex Higgins 3 – 2 (England) Steve Davis
- (England) Steve Davis 3 – 1 (England) Jimmy White
- (Northern Ireland) Alex Higgins 3– 2 (England) Jimmy White

=== Final ===
| Final; Best of 11 frames |
| (England) Steve Davis | 6 |
| (Northern Ireland) Alex Higgins | 3 |
