= 1974 Canadian Open =

Canadian Open
Tournament information
- Dates: 14 August – 2 September 1974
- Venue: Canadian National Exhibition Stadium
- City: Toronto
- Country: Canada
- Organisation: Snooker Canada
- Format: Non-ranking event
- Total prize fund: $3,000
- Winner's share: $1,500
- Highest break: Alex Higgins (NIR) (139)

Final
- Champion: (Canada) Cliff Thorburn
- Runner-up: (Northern Ireland) Dennis Taylor
- Score: 8–6

The 1974 Canadian Open was the first edition of the professional invitational snooker tournament, the Canadian Open, which took place between 14 August and 2 September 1974. It was also referred to as the "Player's International Snooker Championship".

Cliff Thorburn won the title defeating Dennis Taylor 8–6 in the final. There was a total prize fund of $3,000, with $1,500 awarded to the winner and $500 for the runner-up. Alex Higgins compiled the highest break of the tournament, 139.

== Main draw ==
Last 16; Best of 9 frames
(Canada) Cliff Thorburn	5
(Canada) Joe Lapello	3
(England) Willie Thorne	5
(Canada) Dave Ridge	1
(England) Graham Miles	5
(Canada) Tom Regina	2
(Canada) Gabe Tarini	5
(Canada) Julien St Dennis	4
(Northern Ireland) Dennis Taylor	5
(Canada) Fred Pepper	1
(Canada) Eddy Agha	5
(Canada) Bill Werbeniuk	1
(Northern Ireland) Alex Higgins	5
(Canada) Mike Evans	2
(England) John Virgo	5
(Canada) Tino Malo	4

Quarter-finals; Best of 15 frames
(Canada) Cliff Thorburn	8
(England) Willie Thorne	6
(England) Graham Miles	8
(Canada) Gabe Tarini	1
(Northern Ireland) Dennis Taylor	8
(Canada) Eddy Agha	3
(Northern Ireland) Alex Higgins	8
(England) John Virgo	3

Semi-finals; Best of 15 frames
(Canada) Cliff Thorburn	8
(England) Graham Miles	5
(Northern Ireland) Dennis Taylor	8
(Northern Ireland) Alex Higgins	6

Final; Best of 15 frames
(Canada) Cliff Thorburn	8
(Northern Ireland) Dennis Taylor	6
