= 1976 Canadian Club Masters =

Canadian Club Masters
Tournament information
- Dates: 8–11 May 1976
- Venue: Northern Snooker Centre
- City: Leeds
- Country: England
- Organisation: WPBSA
- Format: Non-ranking event
- Total prize fund: £2,200
- Winner's share: £1,000

Final
- Champion: (Northern Ireland) Alex Higgins
- Runner-up: (Wales) Ray Reardon
- Score: 6–4

The 1976 Canadian Club Masters was a professional non-ranking snooker tournament, which took place in the Northern Snooker Centre in Leeds, England from 8 to 11 May 1976. Alex Higgins won the tournament, defeating Ray Reardon 6–4 in the final. The prize fund was £2,200, with the winner receiving £1,000.

The television coverage was presented by Fred Dinenage. The commentator was Ted Lowe.

== Main draw ==
Quarter-finals; Best of 5 frames
(Northern Ireland) Alex Higgins	3
(England) Graham Miles	1
(England) John Pulman	3
(England) John Dunning	2
(Wales) Ray Reardon	3
(Wales) Roy Andrewartha	2
(England) John Spencer	3
(England) John Virgo	0

Semi-finals; Best of 5 frames
(Northern Ireland) Alex Higgins	3
(England) John Pulman	0
(Wales) Ray Reardon	3
(England) John Spencer	1

Final; Best of 11 frames
(Northern Ireland) Alex Higgins	6
(Wales) Ray Reardon	4
