= 1982 Scottish Masters =

Tournament information
- Dates: 23–26 September 1982
- Venue: Holiday Inn
- City: Glasgow
- Country: Scotland
- Organisation: WPBSA
- Format: Non-ranking event
- Total prize fund: £23,000
- Winner's share: £9,000
- Highest break: Steve Davis (ENG) (89)

Final
- Champion: Steve Davis (ENG)
- Runner-up: Alex Higgins (NIR)
- Score: 9–4

The 1982 Langs Supreme Scottish Masters was a professional non-ranking snooker tournament that took place between 23 and 26 September 1982 at the Holiday Inn in Glasgow, Scotland.

The field of 8 included Scot Eddie Sinclair who was beaten 1–5 in his opening match against Alex Higgins.

Steve Davis won the tournament by defeating Alex Higgins 9–4 in the final, winning the first prize of £9,000. Davis led 6–1 after the afternoon session and extended his lead by winning the first frame of the evening session. Higgins won three of the next four frames before Davis won the match by taking the 13th frame.

== Prize fund ==
The breakdown of prize money for this year is shown below:

- Winner: £9,000
- Runner-up: £4,500
- Semi-final: £2,250
- Quarter-final: £1,125
- Highest break: £500
- Total: £23,000

== Tournament draw ==
Quarter-finals; Best of 9 frames
Steve Davis (ENG)	5
Tony Knowles (ENG)	4
Dennis Taylor (NIR)	5
Jimmy White (ENG)	4
Alex Higgins (NIR)	5
Eddie Sinclair (SCO)	1
Terry Griffiths (WAL)	5
Ray Reardon (WAL)	3

Semi-finals; Best of 11 frames
(England) Steve Davis	6
(Northern Ireland) Dennis Taylor	1
(Northern Ireland) Alex Higgins	6
(Wales) Terry Griffiths	5

Final; Best of 17 Frames
(England) Steve Davis	9
(Northern Ireland) Alex Higgins	4
