= Alex Higgins =

Northern Irish snooker player (1949–2010)

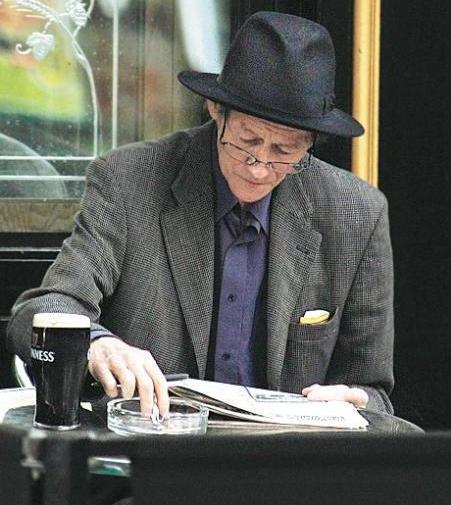
- Higgins in 2008

Personal information
- Nickname: The Hurricane
- Born: 18 March 1949 Belfast, Northern Ireland
- Died: 24 July 2010 (aged 61) Belfast, Northern Ireland

Sport
- Country: Northern Ireland
- Sport: Snooker
- Professional: 1968, 1970–1997
- Highest ranking: 2 (1976–77 and 1982–83)

Tournament wins
- Ranking: 1
- World Championship: 1972; 1982

Alexander Gordon Higgins (18 March 1949 – 24 July 2010) was a Northern Irish professional snooker player and two-time World Champion. Nicknamed "The Hurricane" for his rapid play and known as "The People's Champion" for his popularity and charisma, he is remembered as one of the sport's most iconic figures and is often credited with helping to make snooker a mainstream televised sport in the 1980s.

Higgins won the World Snooker Championship on his first attempt in 1972, beating the defending champion John Spencer 37–31 in the final. Aged 22, he was then the sport's youngest World Champion, a record he held until 21-year-old Stephen Hendry won the title in 1990. He was runner-up to Ray Reardon in 1976 and Cliff Thorburn in 1980. At the 1982 tournament, he defeated Jimmy White 16–15 in the semi-finals, making a 69 clearance in the penultimate frame that is regarded as one of the finest breaks in the sport's history, and then beat Reardon 18–15 in the final to secure his second world title. Images of Higgins tearfully holding his baby daughter after the final are regarded as some of the most iconic in British sport.

Higgins won the Masters in 1978 and 1981 and won the UK Championship in 1983, when he recovered from 0–7 behind to defeat Steve Davis 16–15 in the final. As of 2026, he is one of eleven players to have completed a career Triple Crown. He won the 1984 World Doubles Championship with White and, alongside Dennis Taylor and Eugene Hughes, was a member of the all-Ireland team that won three consecutive World Cups from 1985 to 1987. He won his last professional title at the 1989 Irish Masters, defeating Hendry 9–8 in the final. He dropped off the professional tour in 1997.

Higgins led a chaotic personal life. A lifelong heavy smoker, he struggled with drinking and gambling and admitted to using cocaine and cannabis. His relationships were turbulent; both of his marriages ended in divorce, and he had widely publicised altercations with later partners. Unpredictable and volatile, he was often disciplined by the WPBSA, most notably in 1986, when he was fined £12,000 and banned from five tournaments for assaulting an official, and in 1990, when he was banned for more than a year for punching another official and threatening Taylor. He was diagnosed with throat cancer in 1998 and died of multiple causes at his Belfast home on 24 July 2010, aged 61.

== Life and career ==
=== Early life ===
Alexander Gordon Higgins was born on 18 March 1949 in Belfast, the only son of Alexander Gordon Higgins, a labourer, and his wife Elizabeth (née Stockman), a cleaner; he had three sisters, Isobel, Ann and Jean. He was raised primarily by his mother because his father had sustained a brain injury after being struck by a lorry. The family lived on Abingdon Drive in Sandy Row, a predominantly Protestant working-class area of inner-city south Belfast; Higgins was educated at the local Mabel Street Primary School and Kelvin Secondary School. From age 10, he began frequenting the Jam Pot, a local snooker and billiards hall, running bets for his father and doing odd jobs. He started playing snooker at the Jam Pot at age 11, and he later faced some more challenging opponents at the Shaftesbury and YMCA clubs in the city centre.

After leaving school in 1964, he briefly worked as a messenger for the Irish Linen Company, but the job offered few prospects as the business was in decline. At 15, Higgins spotted an advert for stable boys at Eddie Reavey's stables in Wantage, Berkshire, so he left Belfast in the hope of following in the footsteps of his idol Lester Piggott and becoming a jockey. His employer later recalled Higgins as "a starved little rat from the slums". Despite being fired six times, he was taken back on board and stayed with Reavey for almost two years, during which time he became too heavy to be able to ride competitively. He left the stables and moved to London, where he settled in a flat in Leytonstone and took up snooker again. He won several money matches and earned extra income at a paper mill near London Bridge, but he grew homesick and returned to Belfast in late 1967.

Higgins joined the snooker league at the Mountpottinger YMCA, where he played tougher opponents and practised up to six hours a day, studying weaknesses in the other players and devising new shots in his game. In January 1968, he entered and won the Northern Ireland Amateur Championship, defeating Maurice Gill 4–1 in the final. Winning the title at his first appearance, aged 18, he became the tournament's youngest-ever champion. Shortly afterwards, he won the All-Ireland Amateur Championship and turned professional for a short spell before reverting to amateur status. Around this time, he was appointed captain of the Mountpottinger YMCA snooker team. He defended his Northern Ireland amateur title the following year but lost 0–4 to Dessie Anderson in the final. Higgins defeated world champion John Spencer in several exhibition matches, where he was given a head start of 14 points per frame. These victories, coupled with his rise in popularity (his matches were attended by as many as several hundred people), convinced Higgins to return to England and turn professional.

=== Professional career ===
==== 1970s ====
Higgins settled in Blackburn, Lancashire, as it presented favourable opportunities for pursuing a career in snooker. His talent for the game was recognised by local salesman Dennis Broderick and bingo tycoons Jack Leeming and John McLaughlin, who became his agents and bought him a flat and some new clothes. McLaughlin originated the nickname "Hurricane", although Higgins would have preferred "Alexander the Great". Higgins applied to the Billiards Association and Control Council (BACC) to become a professional player, and his application was accepted in January 1970. He was initially a probationary member, meaning that he had to prove to the BACC that he could earn a living from playing snooker. By this time, he had worked out his strategy against the top professionals, noting that they were 'percentage players' and the way to beat them was to "attack with brute force and scare them to death". His sister Isobel offered to pay the £100 fee for entry into the 1971 World Championship, but Higgins declined because he felt not quite ready.

At the 1972 World Championship, which began in March 1971 and concluded in February 1972, Higgins defeated John Spencer 37–31 in the final to win the world title at his first attempt. (Note: Some sources give the score as 37–32. The CueSport Book of Professional Snooker: The Complete Record & History (2004) says "Higgins triumphed 37–31 (not 37–32 as so many publications have wrongly printed)".) He had won ten consecutive frames in the qualifying competition, defeating Maurice Parkin 11–3 for a place in the main draw. He had then eliminated Jackie Rea 19–11 in the first round, making breaks of 103 and 133 during the match. Rea complimented Higgins on his performance, saying that "He does everything wrong. And yet he knocks such a lot in." (In January 1972, whilst the World Championship was still in progress, Higgins defeated Rea in the final of the Irish Professional Championship, a title that Rea had held for two decades.) In the quarter-finals, Higgins defeated former world champion John Pulman 31–23. In the semi-finals, Rex Williams established a 12–6 lead against him by winning nine consecutive frames; Higgins trailed until the 50th frame, when he was able to draw level and then pull ahead 26–25. The match ended with a deciding frame, in which Williams was leading by 14 points but missed an attempt to pot the blue ball from its spot into a middle pocket. Higgins then compiled a break of 32, and after an exchange of safety play he potted the green ball to clinch victory. Williams later commented: "That blue could have changed the direction of both our careers."

Spectators at the 1972 world final, held at Selly Park British Legion in Birmingham, were seated on makeshift benches made from wooden boards supported on beer barrels. There was a miners' strike in progress at the time of the final, and without normal power on the first evening of play, the opening session was conducted with dim lighting provided by a mobile generator. The scores were tied at 6–6 after the first day of play and 9–9 at the end of the third session; Spencer then pulled ahead in the fourth session to lead 13–11. Higgins kept pace and ended day three tied again at 18–18, this the half-way point of the match. After once more drawing level, at 21–21, Higgins won six consecutive frames to lead 27–21. He also took the first frame on day five but lost four of the next five frames to finish 29–25 ahead. On the last day, Higgins made a break of 82 in the 66th frame, maintaining a four-frame lead at 35–31. He took the opening frame of the concluding session, before compiling breaks of 94 and 46 to win the last frame he needed by 140 points to 0 to secure a 37–31 victory. On winning the championship, Higgins earned £480 in prize money. Aged 22, he was the youngest-ever snooker world champion, a record he held until 21-year-old Stephen Hendry won the title in 1990. Higgins was also the first qualifier to win the world title, a feat since achieved by only three other players—Terry Griffiths in 1979, Shaun Murphy in 2005 and Zhao Xintong in 2025.

During an exhibition match in Bombay, India, an inebriated Higgins was unable to play because of the high temperatures and proceeded to play shirtless, for which he was fined £200. Making his debut appearance on Pot Black in 1973, he lost his first game and stormed off the set; Ted Lowe, the former manager of the Leicester Square Hall snooker venue, who had devised the programme, persuaded him to return and complete his other games, but Higgins was excluded from the show for the next five years due to ongoing friction between the two. Defending his title at the 1973 World Championship, Higgins lost 9–23 to Eddie Charlton in the semi-finals. He blamed the defeat on having to use a new cue, as his usual cue had been broken a few months before the tournament. At the time, the World Professional Billiards and Snooker Association (WPBSA) had scheduled a meeting to hear a complaint that Higgins had dropped out of a tournament after objecting to the lighting conditions. Pulman, the WPBSA chairman, declared that he welcomed Higgins losing because he had "dragged the game down".

By the end of 1974, Higgins had started to alter his attacking style of play, adding more tactical and safety elements, but he produced inconsistent results for the rest of the decade. He reached the world championship final again in 1976 after narrow victories over Cliff Thorburn, Spencer and Charlton. Higgins was leading 10–9 against Ray Reardon in the final, but his game faded as the match progressed. In a contest marred by erratic refereeing and a sub-standard table, Reardon pulled away to win the title for the fifth time, the score finishing at 27–16. At the 1977 World Championship, the first to be held at the Crucible Theatre in Sheffield, Higgins lost the deciding frame of his first-round match against Doug Mountjoy. Although he was not one of the eight invited professionals to enter the 1977 Pontins Open, for which Lowe was an organiser, Higgins was one of 24 players from an entry of 864 to reach the stage where the invited professionals joined the draw, despite having to concede 21 points per frame against amateur players. He whitewashed Reardon and Fred Davis, then defeated Griffiths 7–4 in the final, watched by an audience of around 2,000 people. In their book about world snooker champions, Masters of the Baize (2005), Luke Williams and Paul Gadsby wrote that the tournament "cemented his status as 'The People's Champion'".

Outside competition, Higgins completed a 16-red clearance in a challenge match in 1976, making a break of 146; he potted the brown ball as the first "red", and his 16 chosen colours were ten blacks, five pinks and one green. Higgins retained the Irish Professional title 21–7 against Dennis Taylor in February 1978. The following week, he defeated Taylor 4–3 in their quarter-final match at the 1978 Masters, then beat Reardon 5–1 in the semi-finals. He secured the Masters title, the second-most prestigious tournament behind the world championship at the time, with a 7–5 victory over Thorburn. Having led 3–0, Higgins fell 4–5 behind, but went on to win 7–5.

At the 1978 World Championship, he led Patsy Fagan 12–11 in the first round but was eliminated after losing three close frames: the first on a re-spotted black, the second on the final black, and the third on the final pink. He saw off challenges from Fagan for the Irish Professional title in 1978 and 1979.

==== 1980s ====
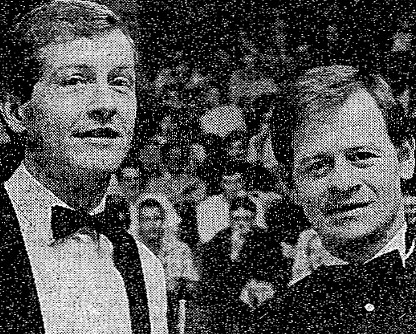
Steve Davis (left) and Alex Higgins in 1988. Higgins wrote in 1987 that, "Playing big match snooker can be as great a turn-on as sex. There's nothing more exhilarating than walking into a room bursting with people to challenge my old enemy, Steve Davis."

In January 1980, Higgins was runner-up at the Classic and won the Padmore Super Crystalate International. The following month, he was fined £200 by the WPBSA for abusive language towards referees and for bringing the game into disrepute. He reached the final of the Masters, losing 5–9 to Griffiths. At the end of February he won both the Tolly Cobbold Classic and the British Gold Cup. By April he had competed in six tournaments in 1980: winning three, finishing as runner-up in two, and reaching the semi-finals of the other.

A few days before the start of the 1980 World Championship, Higgins lost the Irish Professional Championship to Dennis Taylor, having held the title for eight years. At the World Championship, he won a deciding frame against Tony Meo in the first round, then eliminated Perrie Mans, Steve Davis, and Kirk Stevens to reach the final against Cliff Thorburn. Sydney Friskin of The Times described the match as a contrast of styles: "the shrewd cumulative processes of Thorburn against the explosive break-building of Higgins". He also noted that both players had accused the other player of distracting them during the match. Higgins began the final playing the matchplay snooker for which he had been commended, leading 6–3 at the end of the first session and extending his advantage to 9–5. However, Thorburn tied the match at 9–9; they then drew level at 11–11, 13–13, 15–15 and 16–16, after which Thorburn won the two frames he needed to secure victory at 18–16.

In August 1980 Higgins was fined another £200 by the WPBSA following various incidents. He was also banned from continuing his habits of removing his bow tie at the start of the match and licking the cue ball to clean it. He contended that he got a rash on his neck from playing when wearing a tie, and submitted a doctor's note in support; he also argued that "You don't want to be constricted around the throat when you’re playing under pressure." He said that as referees sometimes forgot to clean the cue ball at the end of the frame, he licked it then wiped it with a cloth to prevent kicks, adding that "I'm not doing any harm licking the cue ball. Nobody else is going to lick it, so they're not likely to catch anything." He noted that bowlers would spit on a cricket ball.

Higgins was runner-up to Davis at the 1980 UK Championship, losing the final 6–16. He was the first player to win a second Masters title, beating Terry Griffiths 9–7 in the 1981 final after finishing runner-up to Griffiths the previous year. He lost to Davis in the second round of the 1981 World Championship. The same year, Souvenir Press published "Hurricane" Higgins' Snooker Scrapbook, an autobiographical work that Higgins had written in collaboration with Angela Patmore, having worked on the manuscript for almost a decade.

Higgins won his second world title in 1982. After eliminating Jim Meadowcroft 10–5 in the first round, he won the deciding frame of his match against Doug Mountjoy and prevailed 13–10 against Willie Thorne. He trailed Jimmy White 13–15 in their best-of-31 semi-final match, before taking the 29th frame and then compiling a break of 69 in the penultimate frame. Higgins had been 0–59 points behind but managed to complete an extremely challenging clearance, during which he was rarely in good position; this is regarded as one of the finest breaks in snooker history. He faced Ray Reardon in the final; from 15–15, Higgins took the next three frames for an 18–15 victory, achieving a 135 total clearance in the final frame. A tearful Higgins summoned his wife and baby daughter from the audience to celebrate with him. The images of Higgins holding his daughter after the 1982 world final are regarded as some of the most iconic in British sport. He would have been top of the world rankings for the 1982–83 season had he not forfeited ranking points as a result of disciplinary action. Higgins released a country and western styled single in 1982, titled "One-Four-Seven", but it failed to chart.

He lost 5–16 to Davis in the semi-finals of the 1983 World Championship. Later that year, he reached the final of the UK Championship, where he trailed Davis 0–7 before producing a comeback to win 16–15 for his first UK title. After recovering to two frames behind at 7–9 and levelling the match at 12–12, Higgins had again fallen behind at 12–14 on his way to victory. Snooker journalist and historian David Hendon wrote in 2025 that Higgins had "demonstrat[ed] the heart for a fight that so thrilled audiences". On winning the 1983 UK title, Higgins became the third player—after Steve Davis and Terry Griffiths—to achieve a career Triple Crown. He wrote in 2007: "I knew I had triumphed in one of the greatest comebacks in snooker history. I was back on top, and nothing was going to stand in my way. – How wrong I was. This was just the beginning of the end." Williams and Gadsby wrote that after this win "his career drifted into a gradual downward spiral", and they commented that Higgins was to lose many more matches as he moved "from one crisis and scandal to another". The 1983 UK Championship proved to be the last individual title that Higgins won in the UK. At the 1984 World Championship he lost 9–10 to Neal Foulds after the pair had been level at 7–7.

In the 1984–85 snooker season, he lost 8–16 to Davis in the final of the UK Championship. Higgins and White won the 1984 World Doubles Championship, knocking out the holders Davis and Meo in the semi-finals before beating Thorburn and Thorne 10–2 in the final. He captained the Ireland team to their first snooker World Cup victory in 1985. In the final, he won two frames against Meo to take Ireland from 5–7 behind England to level at 7–7, then won two frames against Davis to clinch the title at 9–7. With his other results including runs to the semi-finals of the 1985 British Open and the final of the 1985 Irish Masters, Higgins earnt over £100,000 in prize money during a season for the first time. His break of 142 in the last-16 round of the British Open was the highest of his career. At the 1985 World Championship, he lost 7–13 to Griffiths in the second round.

Higgins moved up from ninth in the rankings in 1985 to sixth at the end of the 1985–86 snooker season. His best performance in a ranking tournament was reaching the semi-finals of the 1986 British Open where he lost 3–9 to Davis. In the 1985 World Doubles Championship Higgins and White lost their first match, 4–5 to Danny Fowler and Barry West. The Ireland team of Higgins, Dennis Taylor and Eugene Hughes successfully defended their title at the 1986 World Cup. He lost again to Griffiths in the second round of the World Championship, this time 12–13.

In 1986, Higgins split with his manager Del Simmons and signed with Framework, a management group run by Howard Kruger who also managed White, Stevens and Tony Knowles. Later that year, the four players and the band Status Quo released a cover of "The Wanderer" by Dion as a counter to "Snooker Loopy", a pop single featuring snooker players managed by Barry Hearn's Matchroom. At the 1986 UK Championship, Higgins head-butted tournament director Paul Hatherell after an argument; he was fined £12,000 and banned from five tournaments, as well as being convicted of assault and criminal damage arising from the incident and fined £250 by a court. At the 1987 Irish Masters, he was fined £500 for being abusive towards tournament director Kevin Norton. He reached the Masters final for the fifth time in 1987, losing to Dennis Taylor in the deciding frame. The team of Higgins, Taylor and Hughes won the World Cup for a third consecutive year, defeating Canada in the final for the second time. Griffiths beat him 13–10 in the second round of the 1987 World Championship,

By 1988, Higgins had been fined a total of £17,200 in his professional career. That year, he was dropped by Kruger and acquired a new manager, Robin Driscoll. In January 1989, he fell from the window of his partner's first-floor flat, breaking multiple bones in his ankle. He arrived at several subsequent matches on crutches and played while hopping on one leg. Later that year, Kruger's Framework management company was wound up at his instigation, with Higgins claiming that he was owed over £50,000. After Higgins had died, Clive Everton wrote that the money lost to Framework was "a financial blow from which [Higgins] never recovered." The last professional tournament that he won was the 1989 Irish Masters, where he beat Hendry 9–8 in the final.

==== 1990s ====
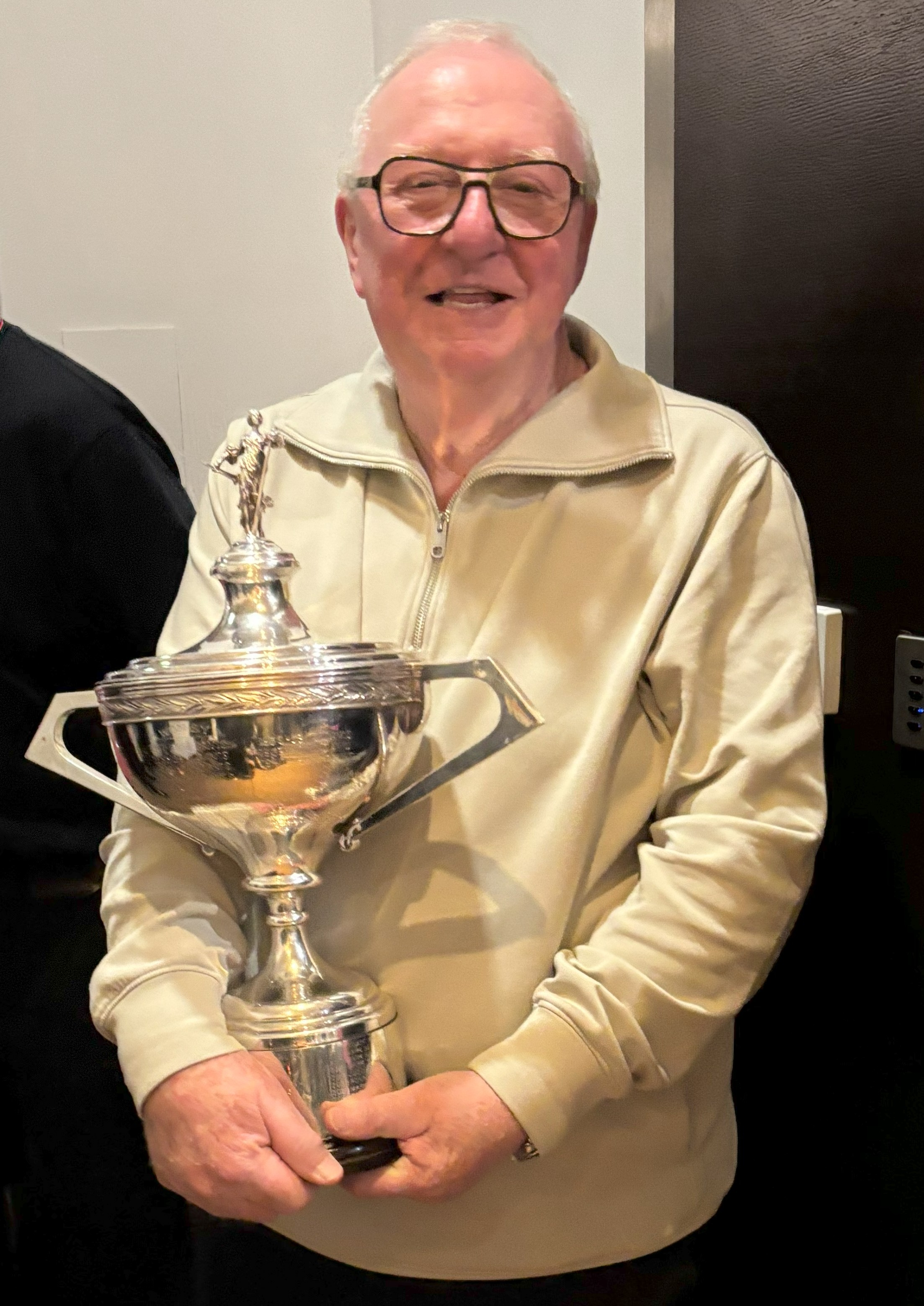
At the 1990 World Cup, Higgins threatened his team captain, Dennis Taylor (pictured in 2025 holding the World Championship trophy).

Higgins made two century breaks in drawing 4–4 with Davis in Reykjavík as part of the 1990 International League. It was the last of 31 matches between the pair in tournaments; Davis won 25 of them. Hendon wrote that in the 1980s, "Higgins served as an unpredictable counterpoint to the reliable Steve Davis". Desmond Kane described the contrast as "snooker's technically and mentally unshakeable champion against the twitching, animated, epic sporting hellraiser Higgins". Davis said that despite the number of times they played each other in tournaments and exhibition matches, the pair were never close. He commented that "I used to be quite frightened of him as an individual. He could be quite vexatious. But on the snooker table, my admiration was immense." Higgins wrote in 1986 that "There's never been any warmth between us. I doubt we've exchanged more than a dozen words in ten years." In his 2007 book, he remarked "I have never said I hated [Davis] ... well, I didn't say it and mean it. How could I? I hardly know him." He also commented that he respected Davis and recognised his talent, although he felt that Davis's manager Barry Hearn was responsible for his success "to a large extent".

Higgins made his last appearance in a major final in March 1990, at the British Open, losing 8–10 against Canadian player Bob Chaperon. Higgins received a runner-up prize of £45,000, the highest of his career. After losing his first-round match to Steve James at the 1990 World Championship, he remained seated in the arena for some time, ordering several vodka and orange drinks, slouched in his chair and twitching. Afterwards, he punched tournament official Colin Randle in the abdomen before attending a press conference at which he announced his retirement, and he threw insults at the media as he left. This followed another incident at the 1990 World Cup, where he had repeatedly argued with fellow player and compatriot Dennis Taylor, insulting his late mother and threatening to have Taylor shot if he returned to Northern Ireland. For his conduct, Higgins was banned from the professional circuit for the remainder of the season (1989–90) and the whole of the next (1990–91). During his 15-month ban, he put together a biography video titled I'm No Angel (1991). He released a cover version of "Wild Thing" in 1992, in collaboration with actor Oliver Reed and the Troggs.

In August 1991, Higgins began his return to the professional circuit by registering for pre-season qualifying matches. Now ranked 120th in the world, he was whitewashed by 20-year-old Adrian Rosa and subsequently failed to qualify for another five tournaments. He reached the last 16 of the 1991 Dubai Classic but lost to James. He also reached the televised stages of the 1991 UK Championship but lost 4–9 to Stephen Hendry in the first round. Hendry claimed that Higgins had said "Up your arse, you cunt" to him during their post-match handshake; he reported the incident to the governing body, and the case was settled in a London court nine months later. Higgins was fined £500, bringing the total amount of fines that he had received as a professional to £23,200. He was heavily defeated 1–10 by Darren Morgan in qualifying for the 1992 World Championship, in a match described by Higgins as "surreal snooker ... never in ten years would I believe that result"; he demanded that he and Morgan take a drug test but later apologised.

Higgins competed in pre-season qualifying matches against amateurs, including former women's champion Stacey Hillyard. He reached the televised rounds of the 1994 World Championship, his first appearance in the last-32 of an event in three years. Drawn against fellow Irishman Ken Doherty in the first round, Higgins was defeated 6–10. The following year, during the qualifying rounds, he complained that the match referee John Williams was distracting him, not by standing in his line of vision but by being "in his line of thought", when he was on a break that had reached 103. When Williams refused to move, Higgins continued his break in tears, eventually making 137, his highest-ever in a world championship match. In December 1995, he was a member of the victorious Team Europe for the Mosconi Cup, a nine-ball pool competition.

Shortly after winning the 1997 World Championship, Doherty agreed to play Higgins in an exhibition match at the Waterfront Hall in Belfast as a benefit event. Doherty, who had idolised Higgins as a youngster, secured a 5–4 victory, and the event raised £10,000 for Higgins. At the end of the 1996–97 season, Higgins was ranked 156th in the world, at a time when only the top 64 players earned a place on the main tour for the following season. Other players could opt to join a "qualifying school" played over the summer of 1997. In August of that year, Higgins played what was to become his final match on the professional circuit with a 1–5 defeat to Neil Mosley at the Plymouth Pavilions. He became aggressive after the match and was escorted out of the venue by police. He then failed to appear at his next two scheduled qualifying matches, saying that he had been attacked with an iron bar; he had a sprained wrist and a sprained ankle.

=== Post-retirement ===
After his exit from the professional game, Higgins spent time playing for small sums of money in and around Northern Ireland. He made appearances in the 2005 and 2006 Irish Professional Championship, experiencing first-round defeats by Garry Hardiman and Joe Delaney, respectively.

On 12 June 2007, it was reported that Higgins had assaulted a referee at a charity match in the north-east of England. Higgins returned to competitive action in September 2007 at the Irish Professional Championship in Dublin, where he was whitewashed 0–5 by former British Open champion Fergal O'Brien in the first round. His autobiography, From the Eye of the Hurricane: My Story, was published in 2007.

In his final years, Higgins earned a meagre living in Belfast by playing against amateurs for small sums of money. He entered the Northern Ireland Amateur Championship in May 2009, "to give it a crack", but he failed to appear for his match.

Higgins played in the 2009 Legends of Snooker but lost 0–2 to Cliff Thorburn and had a highest break of only 13. Thorburn went over to Higgins, who was looking unwell from the effects of cancer treatment, and embraced him after the match, later saying that he did not like to see Higgins in that condition and "We've had our differences over the years, but that's all gone now". In April 2010, Higgins was part of the debut Snooker Legends Tour event at the Crucible in Sheffield, appearing alongside other retired or close-to-retiring professionals, including John Parrott, Jimmy White, John Virgo and Thorburn. He faced Thorburn in his match but lost 0–2.

It is estimated that Higgins earned (and spent) £3–4 million in his career as a snooker player.

== Playing style ==
In describing the unconventional playing technique used by Higgins, his fellow professional Willie Thorne said that "He does everything wrong: his stance is square, he lifts his head, his arm's bent, he snatches at some of his shots." Thorne concluded that Higgins would be the worst example for an aspiring player to imitate. His grip on the cue was less firm than typically employed by professional players. Author Brendan Cooper wrote that "Beset with twitches, sniffs, and odd jerks of the limbs, Higgins would approach the table like a battered boxer trying to stay upright."

Originally an out-and-out attacking player, Higgins developed his tactical game throughout the 1970s and 1980s. Cliff Thorburn praised his innovative positional play, citing him as one of the first players to "break out reds from potting the red, which is a very difficult thing to do." Williams and Gadsby wrote that as Higgins grew older, his "technical shortcomings became burdensome", and that he began to fail on more shots as his hand–eye coordination declined, but noted that his world championship career lasted over two decades. Writing for the Dictionary of Irish Biography, James Quinn said that "His daredevil style thrilled audiences and inspired the kind of adulation and raucous cheering normally heard in football stadiums rather than snooker halls", but a lack of consistency and discipline meant that Higgins failed to achieve as much as his potential should have allowed.

== Media appearances ==
In the summer of 1972, Higgins was the subject of a half-hour Thames TV documentary, Hurricane Higgins. He teamed up with Kenny Lynch in Pro-Celebrity Snooker on ITV in 1978. He was a guest on A Question of Sport in 1980, and on Give Us a Clue the following year. In 1984, he appeared in an episode of International Pro Celebrity Golf on BBC2, partnered with Greg Norman against Lynch and Tom Watson.

Two video games were released for Amstrad computers in 1985, with his endorsement, titled Alex Higgins' World Snooker and Alex Higgins' World Pool. He appeared with Howard Kruger on the chat show Wogan on 6 April 1987, just minutes after being fined £12,000 and banned for five tournaments by the WPBSA; Higgins seemed relaxed and said that he accepted the sanctions. He made another appearance on Wogan in 1991 to promote his documentary video I'm No Angel.

In December 1997, he was featured in the TV documentary Alex Higgins: Rebel Without a Pause, which was broadcast in the Northern Ireland region on BBC1. The Irish Independent reviewer Vincent Gribbin described the show as a "40 minute paranoid rant" by Higgins. According to The Sunday Telegraph reviewer John Preston, Like a Hurricane: The Alex Higgins Story (2001) on BBC2 portrayed Higgins as "a wildly emotional and hopelessly insecure man: vain, fragile, peaceable enough off booze, a terror on it." The RTÉ One documentary Blood Sweat and Tears (2005) charted his career and featured positive remarks about him from Ray Reardon and Steve Davis, despite their past differences. In July 2009, Higgins was a contestant in the Sporting Stars edition of the British television quiz The Weakest Link.

== Personal life ==
Remembered for his turbulent lifestyle, Higgins was a heavy smoker, struggled with drinking and gambling, and admitted to using cocaine and marijuana. He had tempestuous relationships with women—his two marriages both ended in divorce, and he had widely publicised altercations with other girlfriends. He was known as an unpredictable, difficult, and volatile character.

At the time of his 1972 victory at the World Championship, Higgins revealed that he had no permanent address and had recently been living in a row of condemned houses in Blackburn that were awaiting demolition. In the space of one week, he had drifted between five different houses on the same street, moving on to the next one each time his current dwelling was demolished.

He was twice married and had four children from three different relationships. He met Joyce Fox in 1971, and they had a son, Chris, in 1975. They separated six months later; in 2001, Fox told her son that Higgins was his father, and they reconnected in 2003. In April 1975, Higgins married Australian Cara Hasler in Sydney. They had a daughter, Christel, and their divorce was finalised in 1979. He married Lynn Avison in Wilmslow, Cheshire, in January 1980. Their daughter, Lauren, was born in 1980, followed by son Jordan in 1983. Higgins split from Lynn in 1985, and they divorced. That same year, he began a relationship with Siobhan Kidd, which ended in 1989 after he allegedly hit her with a hairdryer. In 1990, he began a relationship with former call girl Holly Haise (a pseudonym of Laura Croucher, her real name). They split in August 1997 after Croucher stabbed Higgins three times during a domestic argument.

Higgins had a long and enduring friendship with actor Oliver Reed, who appeared as a guest on This Is Your Life when Higgins was the subject in 1981. Higgins met Marianne Faithfull during the 1980s and renewed his acquaintance with her in 1992.

Higgins helped a young boy from Manchester, a fan of his who had been in a coma for two months, after his parents had written to him. He recorded messages on tape and sent them to the boy with his best wishes in 1983. He later visited the boy in hospital and played a snooker match that he had promised to have with him when he recovered.

In 1996, Higgins was convicted of assaulting a 14-year-old boy and was given a conditional discharge. He later described the case as "a farce which should not have been brought to court". During his lifetime, Higgins was arrested 17 times.

=== Illness and death ===
Higgins reportedly smoked 80 cigarettes a day. In 1996, he had an operation to remove cancerous growths from his palate. Diagnosed with throat cancer in June 1998, he underwent major surgery on 13 October of that year. He could only speak in a hoarse whisper in his final years because of the damage to his vocal cords.

He was admitted to hospital on 31 March 2010, suffering from pneumonia and breathing problems. The following month, his friends launched a campaign to help raise the £20,000 needed for him to have tooth implants, which would allow him to eat properly and gain weight. He had lost his teeth as a result of the intensive radiotherapy used to treat the throat cancer. It was reported that after losing his teeth, he could only manage a liquid diet and had become increasingly depressed, even contemplating suicide. He was not well enough to have the tooth implants fitted. Despite his illness, Higgins continued to smoke cigarettes and drink heavily until the end of his life. He was admitted to hospital again in May.

By the summer of 2010, his weight had fallen to around 6 stone (38 kg). Despite his £4 million career earnings, Higgins was now bankrupt and having to survive on a £200-a-week disability allowance. He was found dead in bed at his Belfast flat on 24 July 2010, aged 61. The cause of death was a combination of malnutrition, pneumonia, tooth decay and a bronchial condition; his daughter Lauren stated that he had been clear of throat cancer when he died.

Higgins's funeral service was held at St Anne's Cathedral, Belfast, on 2 August 2010. He was buried in Carnmoney Cemetery in Newtownabbey, County Antrim. Among the snooker professionals in attendance were Jimmy White, Willie Thorne, Stephen Hendry, Ken Doherty, Joe Swail, Shaun Murphy and John Virgo.

== Legacy ==
On account of his exciting playing style and explosive persona, Higgins is remembered as one of the most iconic figures in snooker's history. Nicknamed "Alex 'Hurricane' Higgins" (or simply "the Hurricane") for his rapid play, and known as the "People's Champion" for his popularity and charisma, he is often credited as being a key figure in the success of snooker as a mainstream televised sport in the 1980s. Journalist Donald Trelford wrote in 1986 that "it was undoubtedly Higgins who first brought the money into snooker after his dramatic victory in 1972 and all the attendant publicity."

In Steve Davis's Interesting: My Autobiography (2015), he wrote that Higgins as a player was "a true genius. Perhaps only Ronnie O'Sullivan has achieved that same style of mercurial ability since." Higgins arguably fulfilled his potential only intermittently during the peak of his career in the 1970s and 1980s; the snooker journalist and historian Clive Everton put this down to Davis and Ray Reardon both being too consistent for him. Ronnie O'Sullivan has called Higgins "the greatest snooker player I have ever seen" when he was playing at his best, while also acknowledging that his erratic lifestyle caused a lack of consistency on the table. Reardon wrote in 1986 that "Unlike Steve Davis, Alex has a natural snooker brain. He sees situations and knows what to do in a flash. We can all see it eventually but he spots it immediately. Reverse side, screw, deep screw ... he created a lot of the modern play that you see today." Similarly, John Spencer wrote that "Alex probably had the quickest snooker brain in the game." As of 2023, he is one of only eleven players to have completed the "Triple Crown" of winning the World Championship, the UK Championship and the Masters. However, both Davis and Reardon felt that the number of titles won by Higgins was low, considering his sizeable talent.

In 2011, Event 8 of the Players Tour Championship was renamed the 'Alex Higgins International Trophy'. That year, Higgins was one of the eight players added to the World Snooker Tour Hall of Fame in its inaugural year. In 2016, WPBSA chairman Barry Hearn announced that the trophy for the new Northern Ireland Open tournament would be named after Higgins.

Richard Dormer wrote and directed a one-person play based on the career of Alex Higgins, titled Hurricane (2004). Following performances at the Edinburgh Festival Fringe, for which Dormer won The Stage Edinburgh Fringe Best Actor award, the production transferred to the West End and then toured the UK. The professional rivalry between Higgins and Davis was portrayed in a 2016 BBC feature film titled The Rack Pack, in which Higgins was played by Luke Treadaway. He was featured in the 2021 BBC documentary series Gods of Snooker, and was the main focus of the first of the three episodes.

== Performance and rankings timeline ==
Ranking history
Season	1971/ 72	1972/ 73	1973/ 74	1974/ 75	1975/ 76	1976/ 77	1977/ 78	1978/ 79	1979/ 80	1980/ 81	1981/ 82	1982/ 83	1983/ 84	1984/ 85	1985/ 86	1986/ 87	1987/ 88	1988/ 89	1989/ 90	1990/ 91	1991/ 92	1992/ 93	1993/ 94	1994/ 95	1995/ 96	1996/ 97	1997/ 98	Ref.
Ranking	No ranking system					2	5	7	11	4	11	2	5	9	9	6	9	17	24	97	120	72	61	48	51	99	156	

Ranking tournaments
Tournament	1971/ 72	1972/ 73	1973/ 74	1974/ 75	1975/ 76	1976/ 77	1977/ 78	1978/ 79	1979/ 80	1980/ 81	1981/ 82	1982/ 83	1983/ 84	1984/ 85	1985/ 86	1986/ 87	1987/ 88	1988/ 89	1989/ 90	1990/ 91	1991/ 92	1992/ 93	1993/ 94	1994/ 95	1995/ 96	1996/ 97	1997/ 98	Ref.
Hong Kong Open (Note: The event was called the Australian Masters (to 1987), Hong Kong Open (1989/1990) and Australian Open (1994/1995).) (Ranking from 1989)	Not Held								A	A	A	RR	QF	A	1R	A	SF	NH	3R	Not Held					NR	NR	NH	
Grand Prix	Not Held											2R	1R	2R	3R	3R	A	F	2R	A	LQ	LQ	1R	LQ	LQ	LQ	A	
Canadian Masters (Note: The event was also called the Canadian Open (1974/1975–1980/1981)) (Ranking in 1989)	Not Held			SF	W	F	W	SF	SF	SF	Not Held				A	SF	A	LQ	Not Held									
Asian Classic (Note: The event was also called the Dubai Masters (1988/1989), Dubai Classic (1989/90–1994/1995) and Thailand Classic (1995/1996).)	Not Held																	NR	QF	WD	3R	LQ	LQ	LQ	LQ	LQ	NH	
European Open	Not Held																	2R	2R	WD	LQ	1R	LQ	LQ	LQ	LQ	NH	
UK Championship (Ranking from 1984)	Not Held						SF	SF	QF	F	QF	F	W	F	3R	SF	2R	2R	2R	A	1R	1R	1R	3R	LQ	LQ	A	
German Open	Not Held																								LQ	WD	A	
Welsh Open	Not Held																				LQ	LQ	LQ	LQ	LQ	LQ	A	
International Open (Note: The event was also called the Goya Matchroom Trophy (1985/1986).) (Ranking from 1982)	Not Held										SF	2R	1R	QF	3R	2R	A	1R	1R	Not Held		LQ	1R	LQ	LQ	LQ	A	
Strachan Open	Not Held																				LQ	MR	NR	Not Held				
Thailand Open (Note: The event was also called the Thailand Masters (1983/1984–1986/1987 & 1991/1992) and the Asian Open (1989/1990–1992/1993))	Not Held												A				Not Held		2R	WD	LQ	LQ	LQ	LQ	LQ	WD	A	
Classic (Ranking from 1985)	Not Held								F	QF	SF	1R	2R	2R	QF	2R	3R	2R	2R	A	LQ	Not Held						
British Open (Note: The event was also called the British Gold Cup (1979/1980), Yamaha Organs Trophy (1980/1981) and International Masters (1981/1982–1983/1984).) (Ranking from 1985)	Not Held								W	RR	RR	RR	RR	SF	SF	1R	1R	2R	F	A	LQ	1R	LQ	1R	LQ	LQ	A	
World Championship (Ranking from 1974)	W	SF	QF	SF	F	1R	1R	QF	F	2R	W	SF	1R	2R	2R	2R	1R	LQ	1R	A	LQ	LQ	1R	LQ	LQ	LQ	WD	

Non-ranking tournaments
Tournament	1971/ 72	1972/ 73	1973/ 74	1974/ 75	1975/ 76	1976/ 77	1977/ 78		1978/ 79	1979/ 80	1980/ 81	1981/ 82	1982/ 83	1983/ 84	1984/ 85	1985/ 86	1986/ 87	1987/ 88	1988/ 89	1989/ 90	1990/ 91	1991/ 92	1992/ 93	1993/ 94	1994/ 95	1995/ 96	1996/ 97	1997/ 98	Ref.
Park Drive 2000 (Spring)	F	Not Held																											
Park Drive 2000 (Autumn)	A	F	Not Held																										
Men of the Midlands	W	W	Not Held																										
Norwich Union Open	Not Held		SF	SF	Not Held																								
Watney Open	Not Held			W	Not Held																								
Scottish Masters	Not Held											SF	F	SF	SF	QF	F	QF	NH	A	A	A	A	A	A	A	A	A	
The Masters	Not Held			QF	QF	SF	W		F	F	W	SF	1R	QF	QF	1R	F	QF	A	WR	A	LQ	LQ	LQ	A	LQ	A	A	
Irish Masters (Note: The event was also called the Benson & Hedges Ireland Tournament (1974/1975–1976/1977).)	Not Held			F	F	W	SF		SF	SF	SF	SF	SF	SF	F	1R	1R	SF	W	QF	A	1R	A	A	A	A	A	A	
European League (Note: The event was also called the Professional Snooker League (1983/1984), Matchroom League (1986/1987 to 1991/1992), and Premier League (1997/98)/)	Not Held													RR	Not Held		A	A	RR	A	A	A	A	A	A	A	A	A	
Pontins Professional	Not Held		A	A	A	A	RR		A	A	A	QF	A	A	A	A	A	A	A	A	A	A	A	A	A	A	A	A	
Canadian Club Masters	Not Held				W	Not Held																							
World Matchplay Championship	Not Held					QF	Not Held																						
Dry Blackthorn Cup	Not Held						F		Not Held																				
Holsten Lager International	Not Held								SF	Not Held																			
Forward Chemicals Tournament	Not Held								RR	Not Held																			
Padmore Super Crystalate	Not Held									W	Not Held																		
Pontins Camber Sands	Not Held									W	Not Held																		
Champion of Champions	Not Held								F	NH	RR	Not Held																	
Northern Ireland Classic	Not Held											QF	Not Held																
Highland Masters	Not Held											SF	Not Held																
Tolly Cobbold Classic	Not Held								W	W	SF	A	QF	A	Not Held														
KitKat Break for World Champions	Not Held															SF	Not Held												
Pot Black	A	RR	A	A	A	A	RR		A	A	RR	RR	RR	1R	A	1R	Not Held						A	A	A	Not Held			
Belgian Classic	Not Held															SF	Not Held												
Carlsberg Challenge	Not Held														SF	F	SF	A	A	Not Held									
Kent Cup	Not Held																A	QF	A	A	A	NH	A	Not Held					
Hong Kong Gold Cup	Not Held																			F	Not Held								
International League	Not Held																			RR	Not Held								
World Seniors Championship	Not Held																					1R	Not Held						
Irish Professional Championship	W	Not Held					W	W	W	F	A	F	W	NH	F	F	WD	QF	W	Not Held		A	QF	Not Held					
Tenball	Not Held																								QF	Not Held			

Performance Table Legend
LQ	lost in the qualifying draw	#R	lost in the early rounds of the tournament (WR = Wildcard round, RR = Round robin)	QF	lost in the quarter-finals
SF	lost in the semi-finals	F	lost in the final	W	won the tournament
DNQ	did not qualify for the tournament	A	did not participate in the tournament	WD	withdrew from the tournament

NH / Not Held	means an event was not held.
NR / Non-Ranking Event	means an event is/was no longer a ranking event.
R / Ranking Event	means an event is/was a ranking event.
MR / Minor ranking Event	means an event was a minor ranking event.

== Career finals ==
=== Ranking finals: 6 (1 title) ===
Legend
World Championship (1–2) (Note: The World Championship first became a ranking event in 1974.)
UK Championship (0–1) (Note: The UK Championship first became a ranking event in 1984.)
Other (0–2)

Ranking finals contested by Alex Higgins
Outcome	No.	Year	Championship	Opponent in the final	Score
Runner-up	1.	1976	World Championship	Ray Reardon (WAL)	16–27
Runner-up	2.	1980	World Championship (2)	Cliff Thorburn (CAN)	16–18
Winner	1.	1982	World Championship (2)	Ray Reardon (WAL)	18–15
Runner-up	3.	1984	UK Championship (3)	Steve Davis (ENG)	8–16
Runner-up	4.	1988	Grand Prix	Steve Davis (ENG)	6–10
Runner-up	5.	1990	British Open	Bob Chaperon (CAN)	8–10

=== Non-ranking finals: 65 (34 titles) ===
Legend
World Championship (1–0) (Note: The World Championship was a non-ranking event until 1973.)
UK Championship (1–2) (Note: The UK Championship was a non-ranking event until 1983.)
The Masters (2–3)
Other (30–25)

Non-ranking finals contested by Alex Higgins
Outcome	No.	Year	Championship	Opponent in the final	Score	Ref.
Winner	1.	1972	Men of the Midlands	John Spencer (ENG)	4–2	
Winner	2.	1972	Castle Professional	John Spencer (ENG)	Round–Robin	
Winner	3.	1972	Willie Smith Trophy	John Dunning (ENG)	25–13	
Winner	4.	1972	Irish Professional Championship	Jackie Rea (NIR)	28–12	
Winner	5.	1972	World Championship	John Spencer (ENG)	37–31	
Winner	6.	1972	Stratford Professional	John Spencer (ENG)	6–3	
Runner-up	1.	1972	Park Drive 2000 – Spring	John Spencer (ENG)	3–4	
Runner-up	2.	1972	Park Drive 2000 – Autumn	John Spencer (ENG)	3–5	
Runner-up	3.	1972	Marrickville Professional	Eddie Charlton (AUS)	17–19	
Winner	7.	1972	Ford Series Tournament	John Pulman (ENG)	4–2	
Runner-up	4.	1972	Ryde Tournament	Ray Reardon (WAL)	1–4	
Winner	8.	1973	Men of the Midlands (2)	Ray Reardon (WAL)	5–3	
Runner-up	5.	1973	Castle Professional – Event 1	John Spencer (ENG)	Round–Robin	
Winner	9.	1973	Castle Professional – Event 2	John Pulman (ENG)	Round–Robin	
Winner	10.	1974	Watney Open	Fred Davis (ENG)	17–11	
Winner	11.	1974	Castle Professional	John Pulman (ENG)	Round–Robin	
Winner	12.	1974	Ladywood Professional	Graham Miles (ENG)	6–4	
Runner-up	6.	1974	Jackpot Automatics	John Spencer (ENG)	0–5	
Winner	13.	1974	Victorian Professional Championship	Paddy Morgan (AUS)	37–3	
Runner-up	7.	1974	Sydney Professional Tournament	Paddy Morgan (AUS)	0–4	
Runner-up	8.	1975	Ashton Court Country Club Event	John Spencer (ENG)	1–5	
Winner	14.	1975	Canadian Open	John Pulman (ENG)	15–7	
Winner	15.	1975	Suffolk Invitation	Graham Miles (ENG)	5–1	
Winner	16.	1975	Marton Hotel and Country Club Professional	David Taylor (ENG)	6–5	
Runner-up	9.	1975	Benson & Hedges Challenge	John Spencer (ENG)	7–9	
Winner	17.	1976	Canadian Club Masters	Ray Reardon (WAL)	6–4	
Runner-up	10.	1976	Canadian Open	John Spencer (ENG)	9–17	
Runner-up	11.	1976	Benson & Hedges Ireland Tournament (2)	John Spencer (ENG)	0–5	
Winner	18.	1976	Tony's Club Tournament	John Spencer (ENG)	4–1	
Winner	19.	1977	Canadian Open (2)	John Spencer (ENG)	17–14	
Runner-up	12.	1977	Dry Blackthorn Cup	Patsy Fagan (IRE)	2–4	
Winner	20.	1977	Benson & Hedges Ireland Tournament	Ray Reardon (WAL)	5–3	
Winner	21.	1978	Irish Professional Championship (2)	Dennis Taylor (NIR)	21–7	
Winner	22.	1978	The Masters	Cliff Thorburn (CAN)	7–5	
Runner-up	13.	1978	Castle Professional	John Spencer (ENG)	3–5	
Winner	23.	1978	Irish Professional Championship (3)	Patsy Fagan (IRE)	21–13	
Runner-up	14.	1978	Champion of Champions	Ray Reardon (WAL)	9–11	
Runner-up	15.	1978	Suffolk Professional Invitational	Patsy Fagan (IRE)	3–7	
Runner-up	16.	1979	The Masters	Perrie Mans (SAF)	4–8	
Winner	24.	1979	Tolly Cobbold Classic	Ray Reardon (WAL)	5–4	
Winner	25.	1979	Irish Professional Championship (4)	Patsy Fagan (IRE)	21–12	
Winner	26.	1980	Padmore Super Crystalate International	Perrie Mans (SAF)	4–2	
Runner-up	17.	1980	The Classic	John Spencer (ENG)	3–4	
Winner	27.	1980	Tolly Cobbold Classic (2)	Dennis Taylor (NIR)	5–4	
Runner-up	18.	1980	The Masters (2)	Terry Griffiths (WAL)	5–9	
Winner	28.	1980	British Gold Cup	Ray Reardon (WAL)	5–1	
Runner-up	19.	1980	Irish Professional Championship	Dennis Taylor (NIR)	15–21	
Winner	29.	1980	Pontins Camber Sands	Dennis Taylor (NIR)	9–7	
Runner-up	20.	1980	UK Championship	Steve Davis (ENG)	6–16	
Winner	30.	1981	The Masters (2)	Terry Griffiths (WAL)	9–6	
Runner-up	21.	1982	Irish Professional Championship (2)	Dennis Taylor (NIR)	13–16	
Runner-up	22.	1982	Scottish Masters	Steve Davis (ENG)	4–9	
Runner-up	23.	1982	UK Championship (2)	Terry Griffiths (WAL)	15–16	
Winner	31.	1983	Irish Professional Championship (5)	Dennis Taylor (NIR)	16–11	
Winner	32.	1983	UK Championship	Steve Davis (ENG)	16–15	
Runner-up	24.	1985	Irish Masters	Jimmy White (ENG)	5–9	
Runner-up	25.	1985	Irish Professional Championship (3)	Dennis Taylor (NIR)	5–10	
Runner-up	26.	1985	Carlsberg Challenge	Jimmy White (ENG)	3–8	
Runner-up	27.	1986	Irish Professional Championship (4)	Dennis Taylor (NIR)	7–10	
Runner-up	28.	1986	Scottish Masters (2)	Cliff Thorburn (CAN)	8–9	
Runner-up	29.	1987	The Masters (3)	Dennis Taylor (NIR)	8–9	
Runner-up	30.	1988	WPBSA Satellite Tournament (Glasgow)	Gary Wilkinson (ENG)	4–5	
Winner	33.	1989	Irish Professional Championship (6)	Jack McLaughlin (NIR)	9–7	
Runner-up	31.	1989	Hong Kong Gold Cup	Steve Davis (ENG)	3–6	
Winner	34.	1989	Irish Masters	Stephen Hendry (SCO)	9–8	

=== Pro-am finals: 4 (3 titles) ===
Pro-am finals contested by Alex Higgins
Outcome	No.	Year	Championship	Opponent in the final	Score	Ref.
Winner	1.	1975	Castle Open	John Spencer (ENG)	5–2	
Winner	2.	1977	Pontins Spring Open	Terry Griffiths (WAL)	7–4	
Winner	3.	1979	Castle Open (2)	Fred Davis (ENG)	5–1	
Runner-up	1.	1987	Dutch Open	Jonathan Birch (ENG)	2–6	

=== Team finals: 6 (5 titles) ===
Team finals contested by Alex Higgins
Outcome	No.	Year	Championship	Team	Opponent(s) in the final	Score	Ref.
Winner	1.	1975	Ladbroke International	Rest of the World: Cliff Thorburn (CAN); Ray Reardon (WAL); Eddie Charlton (AUS); Alex Higgins (NIR); Jackie Rea (NIR)	England: Rex Williams (ENG); Fred Davis (ENG); Graham Miles (ENG); John Spencer (ENG); John Pulman (ENG)	+113 (Note: Difference in cumulative points scored)	
Winner	2.	1984	World Doubles Championship	Alex Higgins (NIR); Jimmy White (ENG)	Cliff Thorburn (CAN); Willie Thorne (ENG)	10–2	
Winner	3.	1985	World Cup	Ireland "A": Dennis Taylor (NIR); Alex Higgins (NIR); Eugene Hughes (IRE)	England: Steve Davis (ENG); Tony Knowles (ENG); Tony Meo (ENG)	9–7	
Winner	4.	1986	World Cup (2)	Ireland "A": Dennis Taylor (NIR); Alex Higgins (NIR); Eugene Hughes (IRE)	Canada: Cliff Thorburn (CAN); Bill Werbeniuk (CAN); Kirk Stevens (CAN)	9–7	
Winner	5.	1987	World Cup (3)	Ireland "A": Dennis Taylor (NIR); Alex Higgins (NIR); Eugene Hughes (IRE)	Canada: Cliff Thorburn (CAN); Bill Werbeniuk (CAN); Kirk Stevens (CAN)	9–2	
Runner-up	1.	1990	World Cup	Northern Ireland Ireland "A": Dennis Taylor (NIR); Alex Higgins (NIR); Tommy Murphy (NIR)	Canada: Cliff Thorburn (CAN); Bob Chaperon (CAN); Alain Robidoux (CAN)	5–9	

=== Amateur finals: 3 (2 titles) ===
Amateur finals contested by Alex Higgins
Outcome	No.	Year	Championship	Opponent in the final	Score	Ref.
Winner	1.	1968	Northern Ireland Amateur Championship	Maurice Gill (NIR)	4–1	
Winner	2.	1968	All-Ireland Amateur Championship	Gerry Hanway (IRL)	4–1	
Runner-up	1.	1969	Northern Ireland Amateur Championship	Dessie Anderson (NIR)	0–4	

=== Straight pool ===
Pool finals contested by Alex Higgins
Outcome	Year	Championship	Opponent in the final	Score	Ref.
Winner	1976	Australian Invitational Pocket Billiards Championship	Warren Simpson (AUS)	200–98	
