= 1983 Tolly Cobbold Classic =

Tolly Cobbold Classic
Tournament information
- Dates: 21–24 February 1983
- Venue: Corn Exchange
- City: Ipswich
- Country: England
- Organisation: WPBSA
- Format: Non-Ranking event
- Total prize fund: £15,000 plus highest break prize
- Winner's share: £5,000
- Highest break: (England) Steve Davis (100)

Final
- Champion: (England) Steve Davis
- Runner-up: (Wales) Terry Griffiths
- Score: 7–5

The 1983 Tolly Cobbold Classic was the fifth edition of the professional invitational snooker tournament, which was scheduled from 21 to 23 February 1983. The tournament was played at the Corn Exchange in Ipswich, and featured eight professional players.

Steve Davis won the title for the second time in succession, beating Terry Griffiths 7–5 in the final, which finished at 1:50am. Davis also made the highest break of the competition, 100, in the last frame of his match against Dennis Taylor.

== Prize fund ==
The prize fundwas allocated as follows:

- Winner: £5,0000
- Runner-up: £3,000
- Semi-finals: £1,500
- First round: £1,000
- Highest break: £2 per point.

== Main draw ==
Results for the tournament are shown below. Winning players are denoted in bold.

First round Best of 7 frames
(Wales) **Terry Griffiths**	**4**
(Wales) Ray Reardon	2
(Canada) **Bill Werbeniuk**	**4**
(Wales) Doug Mountjoy	2
(England) **Steve Davis**	**4**
(England) Jimmy White	3
(Northern Ireland) Alex Higgins	2
(Northern Ireland) **Dennis Taylor**	**4**

Semi-finals; Best of 9 frames
(Wales) **Terry Griffiths**	**5**
(Canada) Bill Werbeniuk	3
(England) **Steve Davis**	**5**
(Northern Ireland) Dennis Taylor	1

Final; Best of 13 frames
(Wales) Terry Griffiths	5
(England) **Steve Davis**	**7**

== Final ==
Final: Best of 13 frames. Corn Exchange, Ipswich, England, 23 February 1983.
**Steve Davis**; England	**7**–5	Terry Griffiths; Wales
1–106, **83**(57)–39, **68**–41, 20–61, **66**(52)–16, **64**–52, **90**–26, 40–75, 43–52, 69–74(64), **69**–45, **92**(63)–52
63	Highest break	**64**
0	Century breaks	0
**3**	50+ breaks	1

== Century breaks ==
100 (England) Steve Davis
