= 1979 Masters (snooker) =

Professional non-ranking snooker tournament, Jan 1979

1979 Benson & Hedges Masters
Tournament information
- Dates: 22–26 January 1979
- Venue: Wembley Conference Centre
- City: London
- Country: England
- Format: Non-ranking event
- Total prize fund: £8,000
- Winner's share: £3,000
- Highest break: Alex Higgins (NIR) (132)

Final
- Champion: Perrie Mans (RSA)
- Runner-up: Alex Higgins (NIR)
- Score: 8–4

The 1979 Masters (officially the 1979 Benson & Hedges Masters) was a professional non-ranking snooker tournament that took place from 22 to 26 January 1979 at the Wembley Conference Centre in London, England. It was organised by representatives of the sponsors, cigarette brand Benson & Hedges, and sanctioned by the World Professional Billiards and Snooker Association. Ten players were invited to participate, including debutant David Taylor.

Alex Higgins was the defending champion, having defeated Cliff Thorburn 7–5 in the 1978 final. Higgins failed to retain his title, losing 4–8 to Perrie Mans in the final. Mans won the event without making a break above 50. Higgins made the highest break of the tournament, 132, in his quarter-final defeat of Eddie Charlton, surpassing the Masters record of 97 set by Charlton in 1976.

The tournament carried a total prize fund of £8,000, with £3,000 going to the winner. Highlights were broadcast on BBC1's Grandstand, with commentary by Ted Lowe.

== Overview ==
The 1979 Masters was staged at the Wembley Conference Centre in London, with ten invited players and was the fifth edition of the Masters after its establishment in 1975. It was organised by representatives of the sponsors, cigarette brand Benson & Hedges, and sanctioned by the World Professional Billiards and Snooker Association.

Alex Higgins was the defending champion, having defeated Cliff Thorburn 7–5 in the 1978 final. Following his 1978 World Amateur Snooker Championship victory, Cliff Wilson was invited and would have been the first amateur to play in the Masters, but he withdrew due to a threatened boycott by the professional players. Wilson was replaced by David Taylor, who made his debut appearance at the Masters.

The final received coverage on BBC2, and highlights were broadcast as part of Grandstand on BBC1 the next day, with commentary by Ted Lowe for both.

=== Prize fund ===
The winner of the event received £3,000 from a total prize fund of £8,000. The breakdown of prize money is shown below. £10,000 would have been awarded to any player making a maximum break.

- Winner: £3,000
- Runner-up: £1,500
- Semi-finals: £750
- Quarter-finals: £400
- First round: £200
- Total: £8,000

== Summary ==
=== First round ===
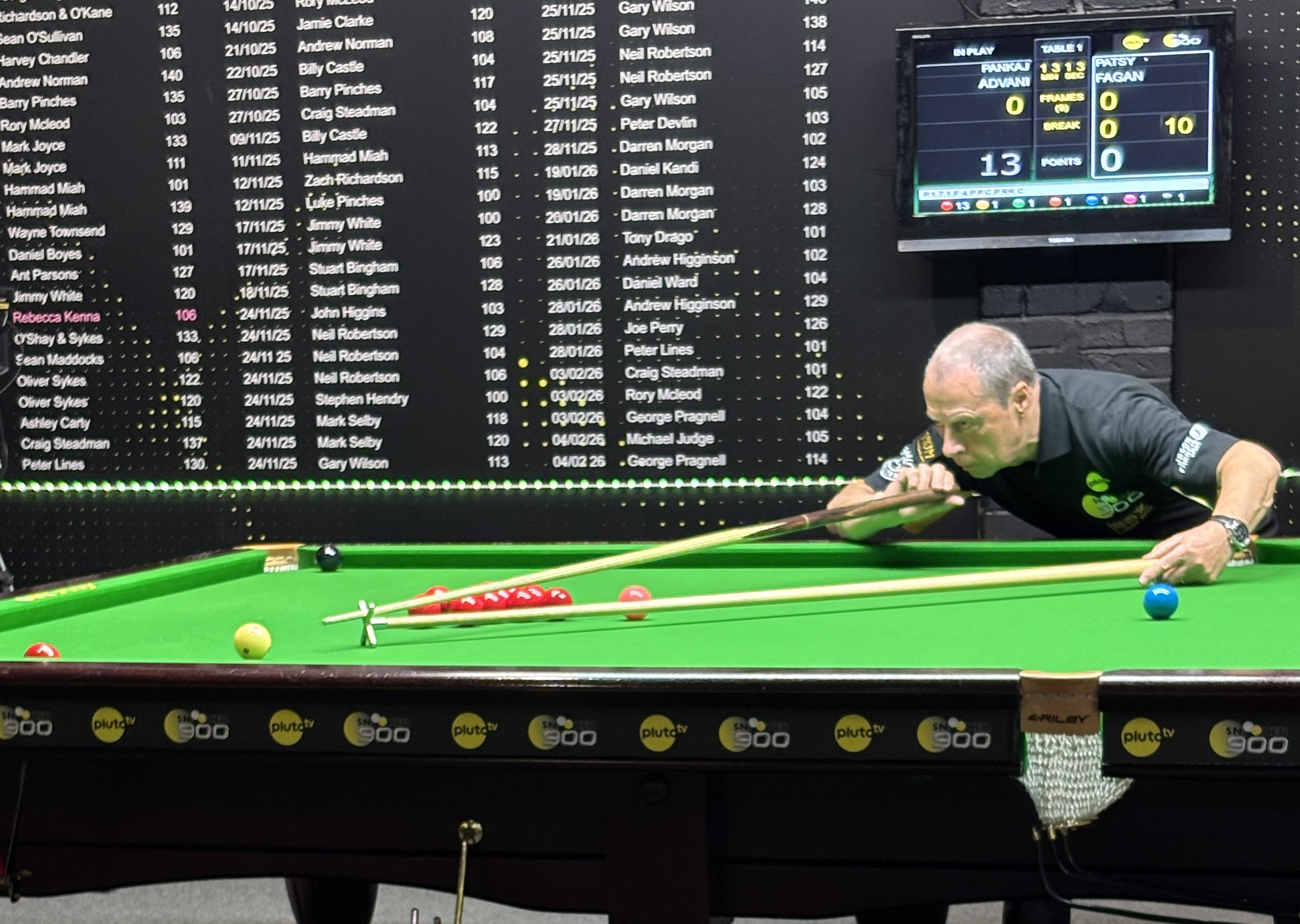
Patsy Fagan playing with a rest in 2026

First round matches were played on 22 and 23 January as the best-of-nine frames. Fred Davis moved into a 2–1 lead against Doug Mountjoy with a break of 69 in the third frame. According to Clive Everton in The Guardian, Davis "always looked slightly uneasy with his game", and Mountjoy won the match by taking the next four frames.

From late 1978, following a car accident, Patsy Fagan started to experience a psychological block when using the rest. This version of the "yips" caused him to spend a long time cueing and then usually miscueing; because of this, he would play left-handed rather than using the rest where possible. This problem affected his match against David Taylor. In what Snooker Scene described as "a match of singularly poor quality", Fagan built a 4–2 lead before Taylor took three successive frames to win 5–4.

=== Quarter-finals ===
The quarter-finals were played from 22 to 24 January as the best-of-nine frames. Alex Higgins was still asleep in his hotel at the start time of his match with Eddie Charlton. Tournament officials sent a message to wake him up, and the match started 30 minutes late. Higgins won the first frame 91–14, and led 3–1 by the end of the first session. In the first frame of the second session, Higgins made a break of 132, surpassing the Masters record of 97 set by Charlton in 1976. Charlton won the next frame aided by a break of 45, but Higgins sealed victory at 5–2 with a 42 break in frame seven.

Doug Mountjoy, who had defeated John Spencer in three of their previous four contests, won the first frame 138–0 with breaks of 27 and 111 and won the next by 85 points. By this stage, Spencer had only potted three balls. Everton commented in his match report in the Guardian that Mountjoy was potting well and "showing a fine touch in his positional play". Mountjoy won the next three frames to complete a 5–0 whitewash.

Perrie Mans led Cliff Thorburn 4–1, but Thorburn went on to level at 4–4. In the deciding frame, Mans fluked the green when escaping from a snooker, and cleared the rest of the colours up to the pink to win. Ray Reardon established a 3–0 lead against Taylor, but then lost the next two frames. Taylor went in-off the final pink in frame six, and Reardon went on to win the frame, clinching victory at 5–2 by taking the following frame as well.

=== Semi-finals ===
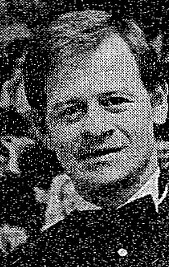
Alex Higgins (pictured in 1988) finished as runner-up.

The semi-finals were held on 25 January as the best-of-nine frames across two sessions. Higgins beat Mountjoy 5–1; Mountjoy won only the second frame, with breaks of 50 and 30. The highest break of the match was 77 by Higgins in the fifth frame, which was interrupted at 24 points when a member of the audience became ill and fell across the table where the tournament trophy was situated.

Mans took a 3–1 lead against Reardon. In the fourth frame, Reardon gained the four snookers he required and cleared the first five colours but then failed to pot the final black; Mans won the frame. Breaks of 50 and 47 respectively in the first two frames of the second session saw Reardon level the match at 3–3. Mans made his highest break of the match, 36, in winning frame seven, and added frame eight to secure his place in the final.

=== Final ===
The final between Higgins and Mans was played on 26 January as the best-of-15 frames across two sessions. The referee was John Smyth. Higgins won the first frame. After trailing by 37 points in the second frame, he compiled consecutive breaks of 33 and 26, with a tactical safety exchange in between, to win the frame and move 2–0 ahead. At this stage, according to the match report in Snooker Scene, "it was difficult to envisage anything other than a Higgins victory." From there, however, Higgins appeared to lose his focus. Higgins's biographer John Hennessey wrote that Higgins "could only watch as Mans swarmed all over him". Mans won the next five frames of the afternoon session to lead 5–2 at the interval, with breaks of 36 in both the fifth and sixth frames.

In the second session, Higgins opened with a break of 24 but broke down with an in-off, leaving Mans in to clear to 42 and extend his lead to 6–2. Higgins made an early break of 43 in the next frame but, needing the last three colours to tie it, went in-off the middle pocket at an unlikely angle and then lost the frame by going in-off when potting the re-spotted black. Higgins won the next two frames to close the gap to 4–7 going into the mid-session interval. Mans won the 12th frame 62–38 to complete an 8–4 victory and win the title.

Mans won the event without making a break above 50. Everton commented that Mans was "an outstanding, single ball potter, and he cramps his opponent's style with tight safety play." Higgins later wrote, "A poor first session against Perrie Mans in the final cost me that match ... I never really hit my stride till it was too late." In 2007, he reflected that Mans played in a style much like his own and had been "a worthy winner. He smashed his way through the frames by taking long shots and risky pots and it paid off for him."

== Main draw ==
The draw for the tournament is shown below. The match winners are shown in bold.

**First round** Best of 9 frames
Fred Davis (ENG)	2
**Doug Mountjoy (WAL)**	**5**
Patsy Fagan (IRL)	4
**David Taylor (ENG)**	**5**

**Quarter-finals**; Best of 9 frames
**Alex Higgins (NIR)**	**5**
Eddie Charlton (AUS)	2
John Spencer (ENG)	0
**Doug Mountjoy (WAL)**	**5**
**Perrie Mans (RSA)**	**5**
Cliff Thorburn (CAN)	4
**Ray Reardon (WAL)**	**5**
David Taylor (ENG)	2

**Semi-finals**; Best of 9 frames
**Alex Higgins (NIR)**	**5**
Doug Mountjoy (WAL)	1
**Perrie Mans (RSA)**	**5**
Ray Reardon (WAL)	3

**Final**; Best of 15 frames
Alex Higgins (NIR)	4
**Perrie Mans (RSA)**	**8**

== Final: details and frame scores ==
Final
Best of 15 frames. Referee: John Smyth; Wembley Conference Centre, London, England, 26 January 1979.
Perrie Mans (RSA)	**8**–4	Alex Higgins (NIR)
First session: 28–**97**, 43–**69**, **75**–60, **69**–37, **97**–38, **72**–29, **71**–23; Second session: **87**–28, **74**–67, 21–**90**, 36–**76**, **62**–38
42	Highest break	43

== Century breaks ==
The following century breaks were made during the tournament:

- 132 – Alex Higgins
- 111 – Doug Mountjoy
