= John Smyth (snooker referee) =

Irish snooker player and official (1928–2007)

Personal information
- Born: 28 May 1928 Dublin, Ireland
- Died: 4 January 2007 (aged 78) Chesterfield, Derbyshire, England

Sport
- Country: Ireland
- Sport: Snooker
- Professional: 1967–1996

John Smyth (28 May 1928 – 4 January 2007) was one of snooker's leading referees in the 1970s and 1980s. He officiated in two World Snooker Championship finals, including the first to be held at the Crucible Theatre in 1977. The second came in 1982 when Alex Higgins won his second world title. He also oversaw the match in which Kirk Stevens compiled a maximum 147 break at the 1984 Wembley Masters.

== Biography ==
Born in Dublin on 28 May 1928, Smyth moved to England when he was 21 and worked as a London Underground driver, becoming Piccadilly line snooker champion six times. He started refereeing in 1967, and first officiated a match involving a professional snooker player at the 1973 Norwich Union Open, which was Sid Hood's 4–0 defeat of Jackie Rea. He became a full-time referee in 1978.

He retired from the circuit in 1996. Shortly afterwards, he looked back on his career and said "I spent 28 years on the Underground, but gave it all up when snooker began to get big on television. John Street, John Williams, and myself, got more and more work as the circuit grew. In the end, my employers saw more of me on TV than they did at work. People told me it was daft to give up the Tube, and that I'd never earn a living from snooker. They said it would never last on TV, but they were wrong."

In 1977, Smyth was instrumental in the formation of the Professional Referees' Association, and was PRA president at the time of his death in 2007. He died of cancer at the age of 78 on 4 January 2007 at his home in Chesterfield.
