= 1980 Canadian Open =

Snooker tournament

Canadian Open
Tournament information
- Dates: 13–31 August 1980
- Venue: Canadian National Exhibition Stadium
- City: Toronto
- Country: Canada
- Organisation: WPBSA
- Format: Non-ranking event
- Total prize fund: $25,000
- Winner's share: $9,000
- Highest break: Willie Thorne (ENG) (139)

Final
- Champion: (Canada) Cliff Thorburn
- Runner-up: (Wales) Terry Griffiths
- Score: 17–10

The 1980 Canadian Open was the seventh edition of the professional invitational snooker tournament, the Canadian Open, which took place between 13 and 31 August 1980. This was the last time the tournament was played until 1985, when the tournament was rebranded as the Canadian Masters.

Cliff Thorburn won the title for the fourth time, beating Terry Griffiths 17–10 in the final.

== Main draw ==
Round 1 Best of 17 frames
(Canada) Eddy Agha | 9
(England) Tony Knowles | 3
(Canada) Mario Morra | 9
(England) Jason Whittaker | 2
(Canada) Ken Shea | 9
(Canada) Paul Thornley | 8
(Canada) Frank Jonik | 9
(Canada) Jim Bear | 6
(Canada) John Bear | 9
(Canada) R Tammett | 4
(England) Willie Thorne | 9
(England) Terry Whitthread | 3
(England) Jimmy White | 9
(England) Vic Harris | 8
(Canada) Bernie Mikkelsen | 9
(Canada) Gilles Boismenu | 1

Round 2 Best of 17 frames
(Canada) Cliff Thorburn | 9
(Canada) Eddy Agha | 1
(Canada) Mario Morra | 9
(Canada) Jim Wych | 3
(Canada) Kirk Stevens | 9
(Canada) Ken Shea | 4
(Canada) Frank Jonik | 9
(England) John Spencer | 7
(Wales) Terry Griffiths | 9
(Canada) John Bear | 4
(England) Steve Davis | 9
(England) Willie Thorne | 3
(Northern Ireland) Alex Higgins | 9
(England) Jimmy White | 7
(England) Tony Meo | 9
(Canada) Bernie Mikkelsen | 1

Quarter-finals; Best of 17 frames
(Canada) Cliff Thorburn | 9
(Canada) Mario Morra | 5
(Canada) Kirk Stevens | 9
(Canada) Frank Jonik | 5
(Wales) Terry Griffiths | 9
(England) Steve Davis | 2
(Northern Ireland) Alex Higgins | 9
(England) Tony Meo | 7

Semi-finals; Best of 17 frames
(Canada) Cliff Thorburn | 9
(Canada) Kirk Stevens | 5
(Wales) Terry Griffiths | 9
(Northern Ireland) Alex Higgins | 6

Final; Best of 33 frames
(Canada) Cliff Thorburn | 17
(Wales) Terry Griffiths | 10
