= 1985 Canadian Professional Championship =

Canadian Professional Championship
Tournament information
- Dates: August 1985
- City: Toronto
- Country: Canada
- Format: Non-ranking event
- Total prize fund: £3,000

Final
- Champion: Cliff Thorburn
- Runner-up: Bob Chaperon
- Score: 6–4

The 1985 Canadian Professional Championship was a professional non-ranking snooker tournament, which took place in August 1985 in Toronto, Canada.

Cliff Thorburn won the title for the second year in a row, and third overall, by beating Bob Chaperon 6–4 in the final.

== Main draw ==
First round Best of 9 frames
Joe Cagianello	5
Jim Bear	4
Jim Wych	5
Wayne Sanderson	2
John Bear	5
Mario Morra	4
Bob Chaperon	5
Paul Thornley	1
Bernie Mikkelsen	5
Gerry Watson	3

Quarter-finals; Best of 11 frames
Cliff Thorburn	6
Joe Cagianello	2
Jim Wych	6
John Bear	3
Bob Chaperon	6
Kirk Stevens	4
Frank Jonik	6
Bernie Mikkelsen	4

Semi-finals; Best of 11 frames
Cliff Thorburn	6
Jim Wych	5
Bob Chaperon	6
Frank Jonik	3

Final; Best of 11 frames
Cliff Thorburn	6
Bob Chaperon	4
