= 1980 Canadian Professional Championship =

Snooker tournament

Canadian Professional Championship
Tournament information
- Dates: 18–22 March 1980
- Venue: Masonic Temple
- City: Toronto
- Country: Canada
- Format: Non-ranking event
- Total prize fund: $15,000
- Winner's share: $4,500
- Highest break: Cliff Thorburn (131)

Final
- Champion: Cliff Thorburn
- Runner-up: Jim Wych
- Score: 9–6

The 1980 Canadian Professional Championship was a professional non-ranking snooker tournament, which took place between 18 and 22 March 1980 at the Masonic Temple in Toronto, Canada.

Cliff Thorburn won the title beating Jim Wych 9–6 in the final.

== Main draw ==
First round Best of 9 frames
Frank Jonik	5
Kevin Robitaille	2

Quarter-finals; Best of 17 frames
Cliff Thorburn	9
Frank Jonik	3
John Bear	9
Bernie Mikkelsen	4
Jim Wych	9
Paul Thornley	2
Kirk Stevens	9
Mario Morra	4

Semi-finals; Best of 17 frames
Cliff Thorburn	9
John Bear	3
Jim Wych	9
Kirk Stevens	7

Final; Best of 17 frames
Cliff Thorburn	9
Jim Wych	6

== Century breaks ==
- 131, 130, 112 – Cliff Thorburn
- 119 – Kevin Robitaille
- 114 – John Bear
