= 1984–85 snooker world rankings =

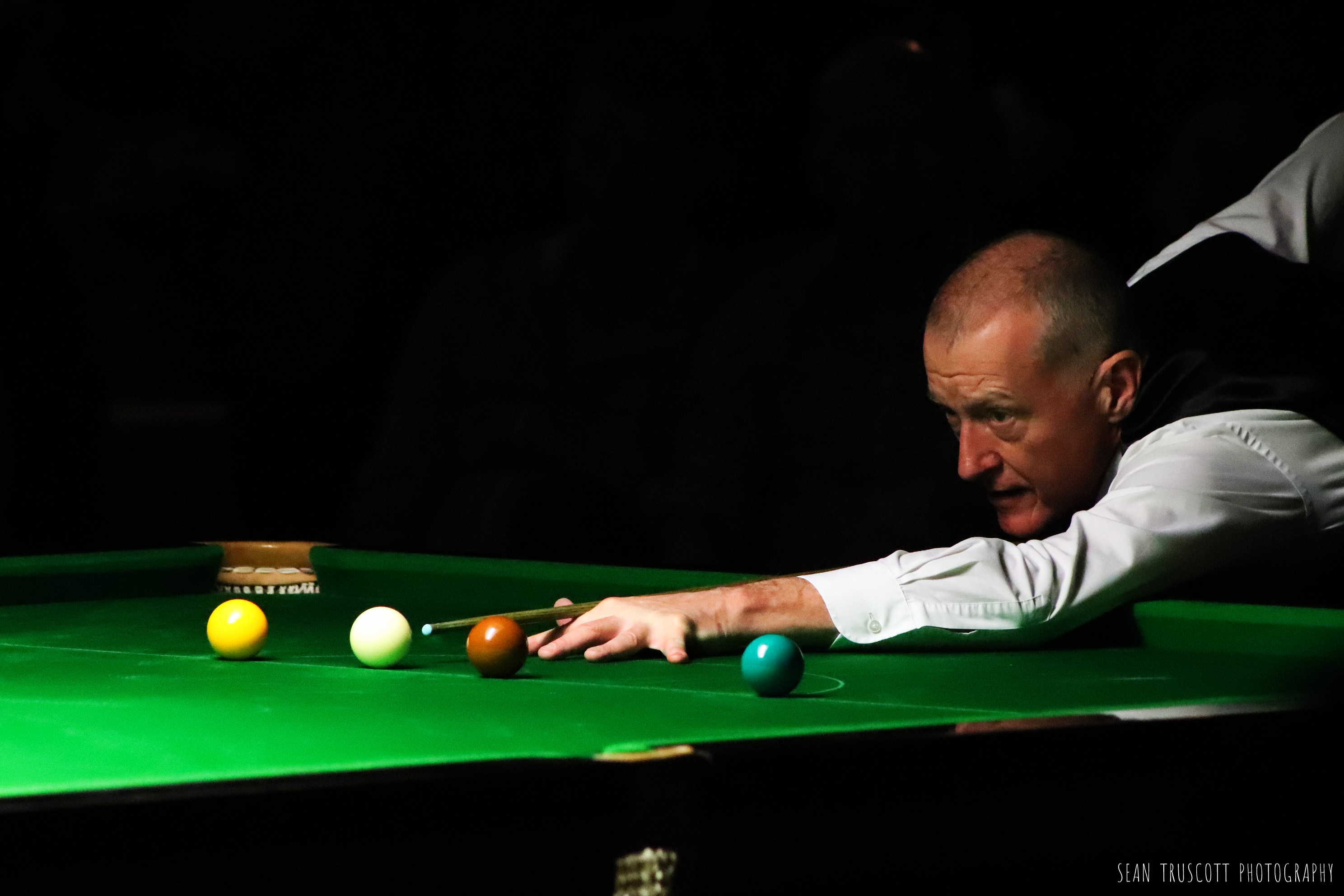
Steve Davis (pictured in 2018) retained his top place in the rankings from the previous list.

The World Professional Billiards and Snooker Association (WPBSA), the governing body for professional snooker, first introduced a ranking system for professional players in 1976, with the aim of seeding players for the World Snooker Championship. The reigning champion would be automatically seeded first, the losing finalist from the previous year seeded second, and the other seedings based on the ranking list. Initially the rankings were based on performances in the preceding three world championships, with five points for the winner, four for the runner-up, three for losing semi-finalists, two for losing quarter-finalists, and one for losers in the last 16 round.

After the 1982 World Snooker Championship, two other tournaments – the International Open and the Professional Players Tournament – which were open to all members of the WPBSA carried points as per the previous system. Points for world championship finishes from 1983 became worth double the previous tariff, with ten points for the winner, eight for the runner up, and so on. In the 1983/84 snooker season, the Lada Classic was added as a ranking tournament. Merit points were awarded to players who were required to compete in qualifying rounds of ranking tournaments and reached the last 32, with a full merit point awarded if this was achieved in the world championship, and half a merit point otherwise. No points were awarded to a player who did not win any matches in a given tournament: for example, a top 16 player seeded into the last 32 of the world championship would not win any merit points if they lost their first match.

The tournaments that counted towards the 1984/1985 rankings were those which were open to all professional players, over three seasons. These were the Jameson International Open 1982 and 1983, the Professional Players Tournament 1982 and 1983, the 1984 Lada Classic, and the 1982, 1983 and 1984 Embassy World Championships. The list was published after the 1984 World Championship.

Steve Davis was ranked first with 32 points, ahead of Tony Knowles in second place with 21 points. Cliff Thorburn was third, with 20 points, a point ahead of Kirk Stevens in fourth. Ray Reardon dropped from second to fifth place. The top 16 players in the rankings were seeded into the main event of the 1985 World Snooker Championship, while all other players would need to enter the qualifying rounds. John Virgo, who did not win any ranking points in the 1983/1984 season, was the only player to lose their place in the top 16 from the previous year. Willie Thorne joined the top 16.

After the initial ranking list was published, the board of the WPBSA voted to award merit points, as well as ranking points, to players who had won qualifying groups and then progressed in the main tournament; the initial list had not included merit points for those players. Three pairs of players exchanged positions as a result: Tony Meo moved from eleventh to tenth place, ahead of Dennis Taylor; Dean Reynolds took 22nd place from Cliff Wilson who moved to 23rd; and Patsy Fagan overtook George Scott to be ranked 37th rather than 38th.

== Points tariff ==
Points tariff contributing to the Snooker world rankings 1984/1985
Position	1982 World Championship	1983 and 1984 World Championships	Other ranking tournaments
Champion	5	10	5
Runner-up	4	8	4
Losing semi-finalist	3	6	3
Losing Quarter-finalist	2	4	2
Last 16 Loser	1	2	1
Last 32 Loser	1 merit point	1 merit point	0.5 merit point

== Rankings ==
The world rankings for the professional snooker players in the 1984/85 season are listed below. In the table, numbers in parentheses indicate that the player earned merit points. (Note: Merit points were awarded in addition to ranking points to players who had won a qualifying-stage group for all of the following tournaments: 1982 World Snooker Championship; 1982 International Open; 1982 Professional Players Tournament; 1983 World Snooker Championship; 1983 International Open; 1983 Professional Players Tournament; 1984 Classic; 1984 World Snooker Championship)

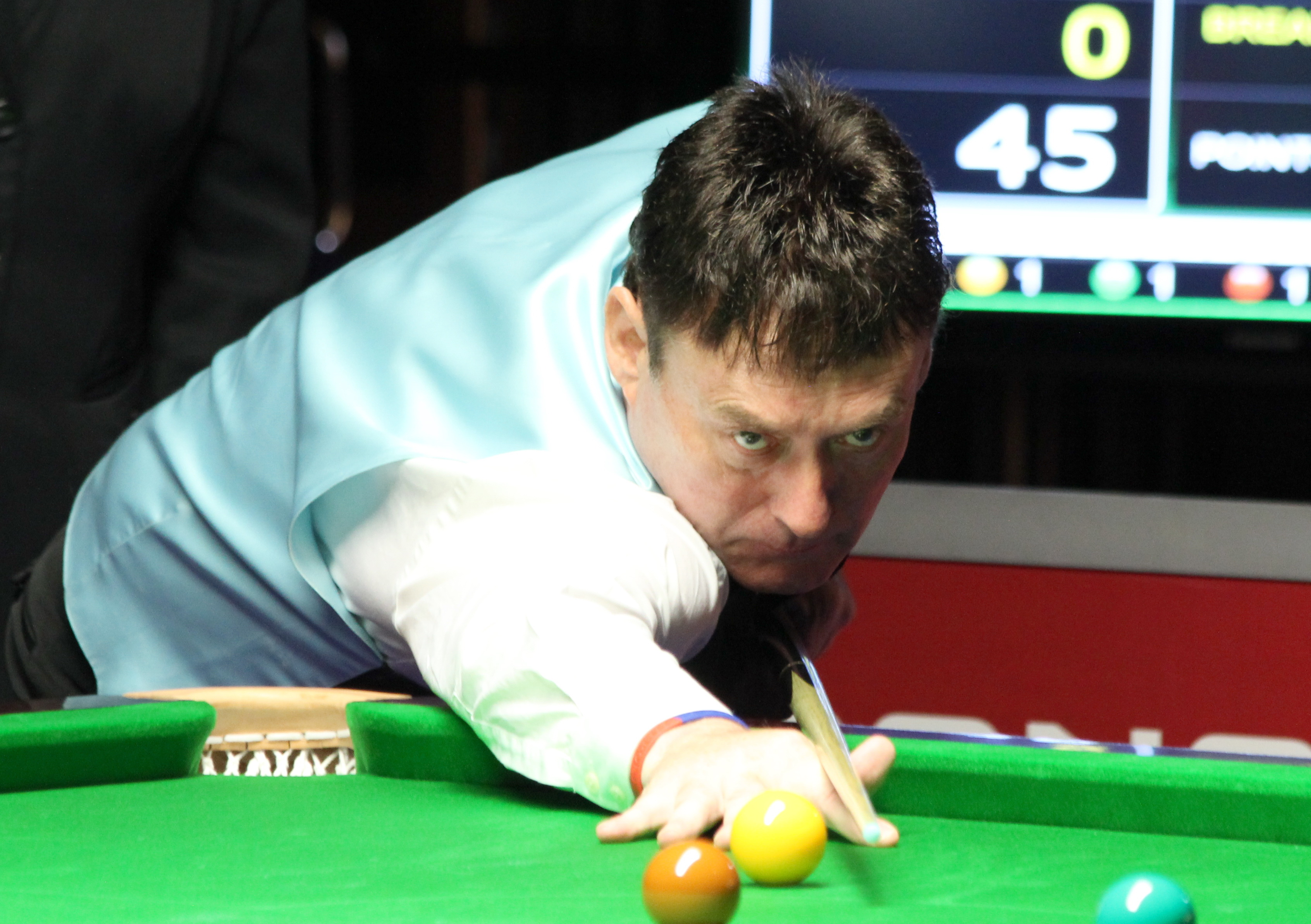
Jimmy White (pictured in 2016) was the losing finalist at the 1984 World Snooker Championship; he advanced from eleventh to seventh place in the rankings.

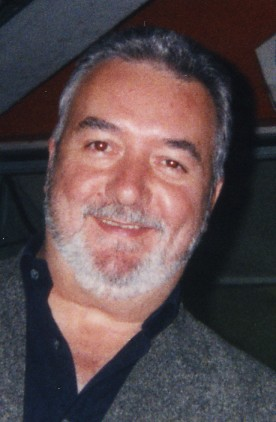
John Virgo (pictured in 2008) did not gain any ranking points in the 1983/84 snooker season, and dropped out of the top 16.

Snooker world rankings 1984/1985
Ranking	Name	1982	1982/83 season			1983/84 season				Ranking points	Merit points
Ranking	Name	WC	IO	PPT	WC	IO	PPT	Cl	WC	Ranking points	Merit points
1	Steve Davis (ENG)	0	2	–	10	5	(0.5)	5	10	32	(0.5)
2	Tony Knowles (ENG)	2+(1)	5	(0.5)	6	1	5+(0.5)	2	0	21	(2)
3	Cliff Thorburn (CAN)	0	1	1+(0.5)	8	4	2+(0.5)	0	4	20	(1)
4	Kirk Stevens (CAN)	2	3	(0.5)	4	–	2+(0.5)	2	6	19	(1)
5	Ray Reardon (WAL)	4	1	5+(0.5)	2	1	1+(0.5)	0	4	18	(1)
6	Eddie Charlton (AUS)	3	0	3+(0.5)	4	3	1+(0.5)	2	2	18	(1)
7	Jimmy White (ENG)	3+(1)	1	4+(0.5)	0	0	(0.5)	1	8	17	(2)
8	Terry Griffiths (WAL)	0	2	2+(0.5)	2	3	1+(0.5)	2	4	16	(1)
9	Alex Higgins (NIR)	5	1	(0.5)	6	0	0	1	0	13	(0.5)
10	Tony Meo (ENG)	(1)	0	1+(0.5)	4+(0.5)	0	3+(0.5)	4	0	12	(3)
11	Dennis Taylor (NIR)	0	2	1+(0.5)	2	1	0	0	6	12	(0.5)
12	Willie Thorne (ENG)	2+(1)	0	(0.5)	2	2+(0.5)	3+(0.5)	0	2+(1)	11	(3.5)
13	John Spencer (ENG)	1	1	1+(0.5)	2	2	(0.5)	1	2	10	(1)
14	Bill Werbeniuk (CAN)	1	1	2+(0.5)	4	0	(0.5)	0	2	10	(1)
15	Doug Mountjoy (WAL)	1	0	0	2	2	0	0	4	9	(0)
16	David Taylor (ENG)	0	4	(0.5)	2	0	(0.5)	0	2	8	(1)
17	Silvino Francisco (RSA)	2+(1)	–	–	(1)	2+(0.5)	1+(0.5)	1+(0.5)	2+(1)	8	(4.5)
18	John Virgo (ENG)	1	3+(0.5)	3+(0.5)	(1)	0	(0.5)	0	0	7	(2.5) (Note: The July 1984 issue of Snooker Scene has 1.5, but this is presumably a typographical error.)
19	Joe Johnson (ENG)	0	0	2+(0.5)	0	(0.5)	4+(0.5)	(0.5)	(1)	6	(3)
20	John Parrott (ENG)	–	–	–	–	–	(0.5)	3+(0.5)	2+(1)	5	(2)
21	Mark Wildman (ENG)	0	(0.5)	1+(0.5)	(1)	(0.5)	1+(0.5)	3+(0.5)	0	5	(3.5)
22	Dean Reynolds (ENG)	1+(1)	1+(0.5)	2+(0.5)	(1)	(0.5)	(0.5)	(0.5)	0	4	(4.5)
23	Cliff Wilson (WAL)	(1)	2+(0.5)	1+(0.5)	(1)	0	1+(0.5)	(0.5)	0	4	(4)
24	Perrie Mans (RSA)	1	1	(0.5)	2	0	–	–	0	4	(0.5)
25	Mike Hallett (ENG)	(1)	0	(0.5)	(1)	0	1+(0.5)	1+(0.5)	(1)	2	(4.5) (Note: The July 1984 issue of Snooker Scene has 4, but this is presumably a typographical error.)
26	Dave Martin (ENG)	(1)	0	(0.5)	(1)	1+(0.5)	1+(0.5)	0	0	2	(3.5)
27	Eugene Hughes (IRL)	0	(0.5)	0	(1)	(0.5)	2+(0.5)	(0.5)	0	2	(3)
28	John Campbell (AUS)	–	–	–	(1)	0	2+(0.5)	(0.5)	0	2	(2)
29	Murdo MacLeod (SCO)	0	0	1+(0.5)	0	(0.5)	0	1+(0.5)	0	2	(1.5)
30	Neal Foulds (ENG)	–	–	–	–	–	0	0	2+(1)	2	(1)
31	Rex Williams (ENG)	(1)	(0.5)	(0.5)	(1)	0	(0.5)	1+(0.5)	(1)	1	(5)
32	Graham Miles (ENG)	1	0	0	(1)	(0.5)	(0.5)	0	(1)	1	(3)
33	Eddie Sinclair (SCO)	0	(0.5)	1+(0.5)	0	(0.5)	0	(0.5)	(1)	1	(3)
34	Mike Watterson (ENG)	0	(0.5)	(0.5)	0	1+(0.5)	(0.5)	0	0	1	(2)
35	Mario Morra (CAN)	0	0	0	0	1+(0.5)	0	0	(1)	1	(1.5)
36	Jim Donnelly (SCO)	(1)	0	0	0	1+(0.5)	0	0	0	1	(1.5)
37	Patsy Fagan (IRL)	(1)	0	0	0	0	0	(0.5)	0	1	(1.5)
38	George Scott (ENG)	–	(0.5)	–	–	1+(0.5)	(0.5)	0	0	1	(1.5)
39	Colin Roscoe (WAL)	0	(0.5)	0	0	0	0	1+(0.5)	0	1	(1)
40	Jim Meadowcroft (ENG)	(1)	(0.5)	(0.5)	(1)	–	(0.5)	(0.5)	0	0	(4)
41	Jim Wych (CAN)	0	(0.5)	(0.5)	–	–	–	–	(1)	0	(2)
42	Mick Fisher (ENG)	–	(0.5)	–	(1)	0	(0.5)	0	0	0	(2)
43	Les Dodd (ENG)	–	(0.5)	–	(1)	0	0	0	0	0	(1.5)
44	Jack Fitzmaurice (ENG)	(1)	0	(0.5)	0	0	0	0	0	0	(1.5)
45	Marcel Gauvreau (CAN)	–	–	–	–	–	0	0	(1)	0	(1)
46	Fred Davis (ENG)	0	0	0	0	0	0	0	(1)	0	(1)
47	Roy Andrewartha (WAL)	–	–	–	0	0	0	0	(1)	0	(1)
48	Warren King (AUS)	–	–	–	0	0	0	0	(1)	0	(1)
49	Paul Mifsud (MLT)	–	–	–	–	–	–	–	(1)	0	(1)
50	Ray Edmonds (ENG)	0	(0.5)	0	0	(0.5)	0	0	0	0	(1)
51	Ian Black (SCO)	0	0	0	(1)	0	0	0	0	0	(1)
52	John Dunning (ENG)	(1)	0	0	–	0	0	0	0	0	(1)
53	John Bear (CAN)	(1)	–	–	–	–	–	–	–	0	(1)
54	Eddie McLaughlin (SCO)	0	0	0	0	0	0	(0.5)	0	0	(0.5)
55	Tommy Murphy (NIR)	0	0	0	0	0	(0.5)	0	0	0	(0.5)
56	Frank Jonik (CAN)	0	0	(0.5)	0	–	0	0	0	0	(0.5)
57	Steve Duggan (ENG)	–	–	–	–	–	(0.5)	0	0	0	(0.5)
58	Paddy Morgan (AUS)	0	–	0	0	(0.5)	0	0	0	0	(0.5)
59	Billy Kelly (IRL)	0	(0.5)	0	0	0	0	0	0	0	(0.5)
60	Clive Everton (WAL)	0	0	(0.5)	0	0	0	0	0	0	(0.5)
61	Jackie Rea (NIR)	–	–	(0.5)	–	0	–	0	–	0	(0.5)

Preceded by 1983/1984	1984/1985	Succeeded by 1985/1986
