= 1983–84 snooker world rankings =

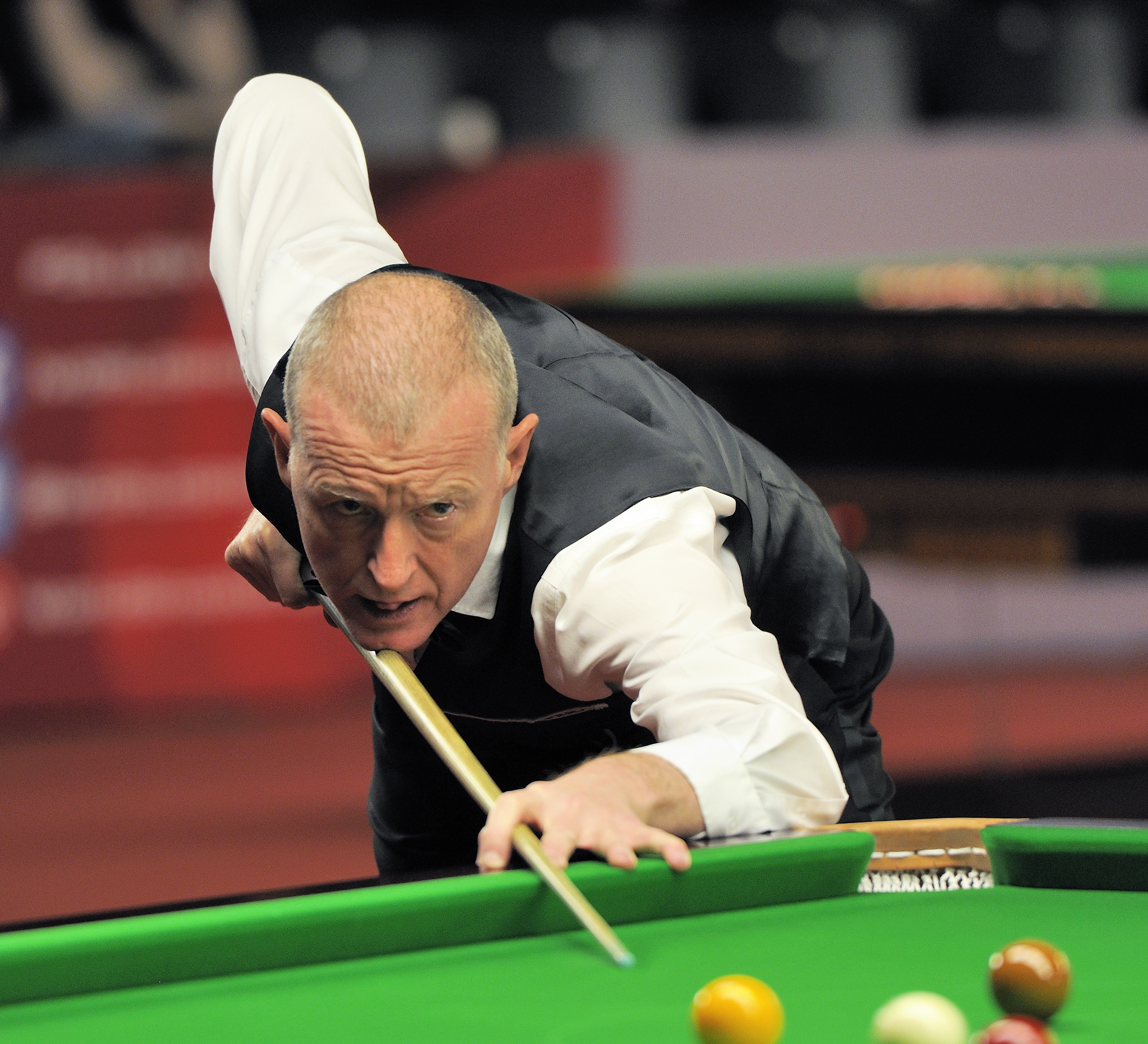
Steve Davis (pictured in 2014) topped the ranking list for the first time.

The World Professional Billiards and Snooker Association, the governing body for professional snooker, first published official world rankings for players on the main tour for the 1976–77 season. Before this, for each tournament the defending champion was seeded first, and the previous year's runner-up second.

A ranking list for the 1983–84 snooker season was issued by the World Professional Billiards and Snooker Association (WPBSA) following the 1983 World Snooker Championship. Players' performances in the previous three World Snooker Championships (1981, 1982 and 1983) contributed to their points total. For 1981 and 1982, the World Champion gained five points, the runner-up received four, losing semi-finalists got three, losing quarter-finalists got two, and losers in the last-16 round received a single point, while for 1983 the points were double this. For the first time, tournaments other than world championship were taken into account, with the 1982 International Open and 1982 Professional Players Tournament both at the same points tariff as the 1981 and 1982 World Championships. Players with no ranking points were ranked on the basis of their performance in the 1983 World Championship. A revised ranking list was issued following a vote by the WPBSA board to amend the rules so that players without any ranking points, which were those ranked lower than 28th, would receive one "merit" point if they had reached the last-32 of the World Championships in scope and half a merit point if they had reached the last 32 of the 1982 International Open or the second round of the 1982 Professional Players Tournament.

Steve Davis was the top-ranked player for the first time, displacing Ray Reardon who moved to second place. Cliff Thorburn retained third place from the previous year, and Tony Knowles rose from fifteenth up to fourth. Perrie Mans and Willie Thorne both dropped out of the top sixteen, which meant they would need to enter the qualifying rounds of the 1984 World Snooker Championship rather than be seeded into the main event. Tony Meo and John Virgo moved into the top 16.

In her book Cruel Game: The Inside Story of Snooker, published in April 1983, Jean Rafferty wrote that "The world rankings are calculated with such little regard for the synchronisation of achievement and reward that they must be seen as creative rather than informative."

== Rankings ==
The rankings including players with merit points (which are indicated with a ^{†} symbol) are shown below. In the original list there were 32 players; Mike Hallett was 29th, followed by Eugene Hughes, Les Dodd and John Campbell.

Ranking	Name	1981	1982	1982–83 season			Total
Ranking	Name	WC	WC	IO	PPT	WC	Total
1	Steve Davis (ENG)	5	0	2	–	10	17
2	Ray Reardon (WAL)	3	4	1	5	2	15
3	Cliff Thorburn (CAN)	3	0	1	1	8	13
4	Tony Knowles (ENG)	0	2	5	0	6	13
5	Alex Higgins (NIR)	1 (Note: Two points were deducted for misconduct.)	5	1	0	6	11
6	Eddie Charlton (AUS)	1	3	0	3	4	11
7	Kirk Stevens (CAN)	1	2	3	0	4	10
8	Bill Werbeniuk (CAN)	2	1	1	2	4	10
9	Terry Griffiths (WAL)	2	0	2	2	2	8
10	David Taylor (ENG)	2	0	4	0	2	8
11	Jimmy White (ENG)	0	3	1	4	0	8
12	Doug Mountjoy (WAL)	4	1	0	0	2	7
13	Dennis Taylor (NIR)	2	0	2	1	2	7
14	John Virgo (ENG)	0	1	3	3	0	7
15	Tony Meo (ENG)	1	0	0	1	4	6
16	John Spencer (ENG)	1	1	1	1	2	6
17	Perrie Mans (RSA)	1	1	1	0	2	5
18	Willie Thorne (ENG)	0	2	0	0	2	4
19	Dean Reynolds (ENG)	–	1	1	2	0	4
20	Cliff Wilson (WAL)	0	0	2	1	0	3
21	Silvino Francisco (RSA)	–	2	–	–	0	2
22	Graham Miles (ENG)	1	1	0	0	0	2
23	Joe Johnson (ENG)	0	0	0	2	0	2
24	Mark Wildman (ENG)	0	0	0	1	0	1
25	Patsy Fagan (IRL)	0	1	0	0	0	1
26	Eddie Sinclair (SCO)	0	0	0	1	0	1
27	Murdo MacLeod (SCO)	–	0	0	1	0	1
28	Fred Davis (ENG)	1	0	0	0	0	1
29	Dave Martin (ENG)	1^{†}	1^{†}	0	0.5^{†}	1^{†}	3.5^{†}
30	Rex Williams (ENG)	0	1^{†}	0.5^{†}	0.5^{†}	1^{†}	3^{†}
31	Jim Meadowcroft (ENG)	0	1^{†}	0.5^{†}	0.5^{†}	1^{†}	3^{†}
32	Mike Hallett (ENG)	0	1^{†}	0	0.5^{†}	1^{†}	2.5^{†}
33	John Dunning (ENG)	1^{†}	1^{†}	0	0	0	2^{†}
34	Ray Edmonds (ENG)	1^{†}	0	0.5^{†}	0	0	1.5^{†}
35	Eugene Hughes (IRE)	0	0	0.5^{†}	0	1^{†}	1.5^{†}
36	Les Dodd (ENG)	0	0	0.5^{†}	0	1^{†}	1.5^{†}
37	Mick Fisher (ENG)	0	0	0.5^{†}	0	1^{†}	1.5^{†}
38	Jack Fitzmaurice (ENG)	0	1^{†}	0.5^{†}	0	0	1.5^{†}
39	John Campbell (AUS)	0	0	0	0	1^{†}	1^{†}
40	Ian Black (SCO)	0	0	0	0	1^{†}	1^{†}
41	Jim Donnelly (SCO)	0	1^{†}	0	0	0	1^{†}
42	Mike Watterson (ENG)	0	0	0.5^{†}	0.5^{†}	0	1^{†}
43	Jim Wych (CAN)	0	0	0.5^{†}	0.5^{†}	0	1^{†}
44	Billy Kelly (IRE)	0	0	0.5^{†}	0	0	0.5^{†}
45	Frank Jonik (CAN)	0	0	0	0.5^{†}	0	0.5^{†}
46	Colin Roscoe (WAL)	0	0	0.5^{†}	0	0	0.5^{†}
47	Clive Everton (WAL)	0	0	0	0.5^{†}	0	0.5^{†}
48	Jackie Rea (NIR)	0	0	0	0.5^{†}	0	0.5^{†}
49	George Scott (ENG)	0	0	0.5^{†}	0	0	0.5^{†}

Preceded by 1982/1983	1983/1984	Succeeded by 1984/1985
