= 1987 Canadian Professional Championship =

Canadian Professional Championship
Tournament information
- Dates: 2–8 August 1987
- Venue: Scarborough Village Theatre
- City: Toronto
- Country: Canada
- Format: Non-ranking event
- Total prize fund: $30,000
- Winner's share: $6,000
- Highest break: Cliff Thorburn (84)

Final
- Champion: Cliff Thorburn
- Runner-up: Jim Bear
- Score: 8–4

The 1987 BCE Canadian Professional Championship was a professional non-ranking snooker tournament, which took place between 2 and 8 August 1987 at the Scarborough Village Theatre in Toronto, Canada.

Cliff Thorburn won the title for the fourth year in a row, and fifth overall, by beating Jim Bear 8–4 in the final.

== Main draw ==
First round Best of 11 frames
Gerry Watson	6
Paul Thornley	4
Mario Morra	6
Bob Chaperon	5
Frank Jonik	6
Wayne Sanderson	3
Jim Bear	6
Bernie Mikkelsen	0
Jim Wych	6
Gino Rigitano	4

Quarter-finals; Best of 11 frames
Cliff Thorburn	6
Gerry Watson	3
Mario Morra	6
Frank Jonik	2
Jim Bear	6
Jim Wych	4
Kirk Stevens	6
Joe Cagianello	0

Semi-finals; Best of 13 frames
Cliff Thorburn	7
Mario Morra	4
Jim Bear	7
Kirk Stevens	2

Final; Best of 15 frames
Cliff Thorburn	8
Jim Bear	4
