= 1986 Canadian Professional Championship =

Canadian Professional Championship
Tournament information
- Dates: 28 July – 3 August 1986
- Venue: Snooker Centre
- City: Toronto
- Country: Canada
- Format: Non-ranking event
- Total prize fund: £13,000
- Winner's share: £2,900
- Highest break: Jim Wych (129)

Final
- Champion: Cliff Thorburn
- Runner-up: Jim Wych
- Score: 6–2

The 1986 Canadian Professional Championship was a professional non-ranking snooker tournament, which took place between 28 July and 3 August 1986, at the Snooker Centre in Toronto, Canada.

Cliff Thorburn won the title for the third year in a row, and fourth overall, by beating Jim Wych with a score of 6–2 in the final. Wych compiled the highest break of the tournament, 129, in his quarter-final match against Bernie Mikkelsen.

The World Professional Billiards and Snooker Association funded £13,000 in prize money through its national championship subsidy, a scheme which provided £1,000 per entrant. Thorburn received £2,900 as winner.

== Main draw ==
Best of 11 frames

First round
Gerry Watson | 6
Joe Cagianello | 3
Frank Jonik | 6
Gino Rigitano | 1
Bob Chaperon | 6
Jim Bear | 3
Bernie Mikkelsen | 6
Wayne Sanderson | 1
Paul Thornley | 6
Mario Morra | 4

Quarter-finals
Cliff Thorburn | 6
Gerry Watson | 1
Frank Jonik | 6
Bob Chaperon | 3
Jim Wych | 6
Bernie Mikkelsen | 3
Kirk Stevens | 6
Paul Thornley | 2

Semi-finals
Cliff Thorburn | 6
Frank Jonik | 3
Jim Wych | 6
Kirk Stevens | 2

Final
Cliff Thorburn | 6
Jim Wych | 2
