= 1983 Canadian Professional Championship =

Canadian Professional Championship
Tournament information
- Dates: 23 August – 4 September 1983
- Venue: Canadian National Exhibition Stadium
- City: Toronto
- Country: Canada
- Format: Non-ranking event
- Total prize fund: $20,000
- Winner's share: $5,000
- Highest break: Jim Bear (128)

Final
- Champion: Kirk Stevens
- Runner-up: Frank Jonik
- Score: 9–8

The 1983 Canadian Professional Championship was a professional non-ranking snooker tournament, which took place between 23 August and 4 September 1983 at the Canadian National Exhibition Stadium in Toronto, Canada.

Kirk Stevens won his first professional title, beating Frank Jonik 9–6 in the final.

== Main draw ==
Quarter-finals; Best of 17 Frames
Kirk Stevens	9
Joe Cagianello	1
Jim Bear	9
John Bear	5
Frank Jonik	9
Jim Wych	5
Cliff Thorburn	9
Bernie Mikkelsen	2

Semi-finals; Best of 17 Frames
Kirk Stevens	9
Jim Bear	8
Frank Jonik	9
Cliff Thorburn	6

Final; Best of 17 Frames
Kirk Stevens	9
Frank Jonik	8
