= 1982–83 snooker world rankings =

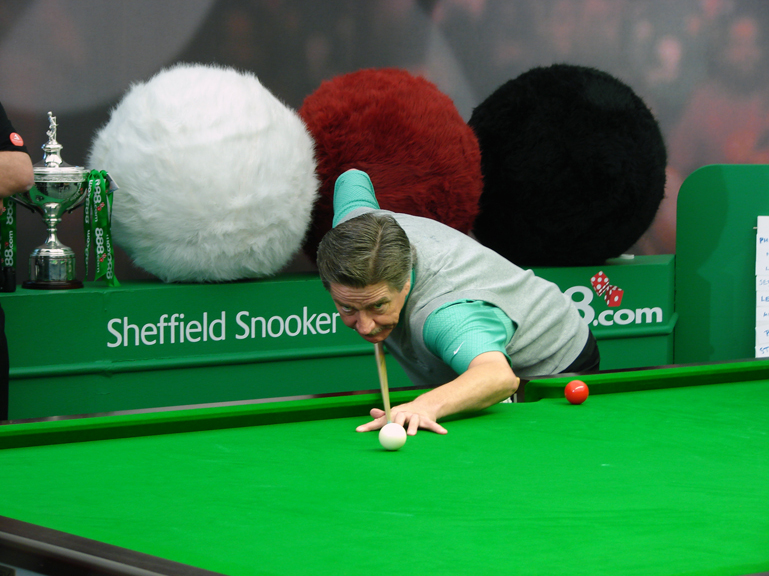
Cliff Thorburn (pictured in 2007) dropped from first place in the previous list to third in 1982/1983.

The World Professional Billiards and Snooker Association, the governing body for professional snooker, first published official world rankings for players on the main tour for the 1976–77 season. Before this, for each tournament the defending champion was seeded first, and the previous year's runner-up second.

For the 1982–83 season, players' performances in the previous three World Snooker Championships (1980, 1981 and 1982) contributed to their points total. For each of the three years, the World Champion gained five points, the runner-up received four, losing semi-finalists got three, losing quarter-finalists got two, and losers in the last-16 round received a single point. For players with no points, placings were determined on the basis of their results at the 1982 World Championship.

Ray Reardon, who had topped every previous ranking list except during 1981/1982, returned to first position, with nine points. The player whom Reardon replaced as number one, Cliff Thorburn, had eight points and dropped to third position. Also with eight points, Alex Higgins was ranked ahead of Thorburn by virtue of better progress at the 1982 championship. Higgins had two ranking points deducted for misconduct which meant that he was ranked second rather than first. The penalty was applied in respect of Higgins's conduct at an exhibition match at Herringthorpe Leisure Centre in February 1981, when he was late returning to his match against Steve Davis, reportedly because he was playing Space Invaders. Davis moved down two places from second to fourth, while Terry Griffiths fell from third to fourteenth. The top sixteen players in the rankings were seeded through to the main stage of the 1983 World Snooker Championship.

== Rankings ==
The world rankings for professional snooker players in the 1982–1983 season are listed below. Points gained in each of the three World Snooker Championships are shown, with the total number of points given in the last column. A "–" symbol indicates that the player did not participate in that year's championship.

Snooker world rankings 1982/1983
Ranking	Name	1980	1981	1982	Total
1	Ray Reardon (WAL)	2	3	4	9
2	Alex Higgins (NIR)	4	1 (Note: Two points were deducted for misconduct.)	5	8
3	Cliff Thorburn (CAN)	5	3	0	8
4	Steve Davis (ENG)	2	5	0	7
5	Eddie Charlton (AUS)	2	1	3	6
6	Kirk Stevens (CAN)	3	1	2	6
7	Doug Mountjoy (WAL)	1	4	1	6
8	David Taylor (ENG)	3	2	0	5
9	Bill Werbeniuk (CAN)	1	2	1	4
10	Jimmy White (ENG)	–	0	3	3
11	Perrie Mans (RSA)	1	1	1	3
12	John Spencer (ENG)	1	1	1	3
13	Dennis Taylor (NIR)	1	2	0	3
14	Terry Griffiths (WAL)	1	2	0	3
15	Tony Knowles (ENG)	–	0	2	2
16	Willie Thorne (ENG)	0	0	2	2
17	Silvino Francisco (RSA)	–	–	2	2
18	Graham Miles (ENG)	0	1	1	2
19	John Virgo (ENG)	1	0	1	2
20	Fred Davis (ENG)	1	1	0	2
21	Jim Wych (CAN)	2	0	0	2
22	Dean Reynolds (ENG)	–	–	1	1
23	Patsy Fagan (IRL)	0	0	1	1
24	Tony Meo (ENG)	0	1	0	1
25	John Bear (CAN)	0	–	0	0
26	Cliff Wilson (WAL)	0	0	0	0
27	Dave Martin (ENG)	–	0	0	0
28	Jim Meadowcroft (ENG)	0	0	0	0
29	Jim Donnelly (SCO)	–	–	0	0
30	John Dunning (ENG)	0	0	0	0
31	Mike Hallett (ENG)	0	0	0	0
32	Jack Fitzmaurice (ENG)	–	–	0	0

Preceded by 1981/1982	1982/1983	Succeeded by 1983/1984
