= 1982 Professional Players Tournament =

Professional Players Tournament
Tournament information
- Dates: 11–22 October 1982
- Venue: La Reserve; International Snooker Club
- City: Sutton Coldfield; Aston
- Country: England
- Organisation: WPBSA
- Format: Ranking event
- Total prize fund: £32,000
- Winner's share: £5,000

Final
- Champion: Ray Reardon (WAL)
- Runner-up: Jimmy White (ENG)
- Score: 10–5

The 1982 Professional Players Tournament was a professional ranking snooker tournament that took place in two venues in the Birmingham area. One was at the La Reserve in Sutton Coldfield and the other was the International Snooker Club in Aston. It was the first tournament in a series which is now known as the World Open. The event was untelevised and unsponsored.

Ray Reardon defeated Jimmy White 10–5 in the final to win the first prize of £5,000 and his first ranking title since the 1978 World Championship. Reardon became the oldest winner of a ranking event at the age of 50 years and 14 days. This record stood for 43 years, until Mark Williams won the 2025 Xi'an Grand Prix aged 50 years and 206 days.

Six places in the 1983 Masters were allocated to the players – those not already in the field – who advanced furthest in this event. These were semi-finalist John Virgo; quarter-finalists Joe Johnson, Dean Reynolds and Bill Werbeniuk; and Mark Wildman and Tony Meo who lost in the last 16.

== Main draw ==
Last 64; Best of 9 frames
Eddie Sinclair (SCO)	5
Fred Davis (ENG)	2
Jim Meadowcroft (ENG)	5
Bernard Bennett (ENG)	4
Mike Watterson (ENG)	5
Jim Donnelly (SCO)	4
Terry Griffiths (WAL)	5
Colin Roscoe (WAL)	1
Dennis Taylor (NIR)	5
Ray Edmonds (ENG)	4
David Taylor (ENG)	5
Ian Anderson (AUS)	1
Jimmy White (ENG)	w/o
John Phillips (SCO)	w/d
Jim Wych (CAN)	5
Billy Kelly (IRL)	0
John Virgo (ENG)	5
Ian Black (SCO)	2
Mike Hallett (ENG)	5
Vic Harris (ENG)	3
John Spencer (ENG)	5
Geoff Foulds (ENG)	1
Dave Martin (ENG)	5
Matt Gibson (SCO)	2
Kirk Stevens (CAN)	5
Eugene Hughes (IRL)	2
Joe Johnson (ENG)	5
Graham Miles (ENG)	1
Perrie Mans (RSA)	5
Eddie McLaughlin (SCO)	2
Mark Wildman (ENG)	5
John Dunning (ENG)	4

Last 32; Best of 9 frames
(Scotland) Eddie Sinclair	5
(England) Jim Meadowcroft	3
(England) Mike Watterson	2
(Wales) Terry Griffiths	5
(Northern Ireland) Dennis Taylor	5
(England) David Taylor	1
(England) Jimmy White	5
(Canada) Jim Wych	0
(England) John Virgo	5
(England) Mike Hallett	2
(England) John Spencer	5
(England) Dave Martin	3
(Canada) Kirk Stevens	1
(England) Joe Johnson	5
(South Africa) Perrie Mans	4
(England) Mark Wildman	5

Last 16; Best of 9 frames
(Scotland) Eddie Sinclair	3
(Wales) Terry Griffiths	5
(Northern Ireland) Dennis Taylor	3
(England) Jimmy White	5
(England) John Virgo	5
(England) John Spencer	1
(England) Joe Johnson	5
(England) Mark Wildman	4

Quarter-finals; Best of 9 frames
(Wales) Terry Griffiths	2
(England) Jimmy White	5
(England) John Virgo	5
(England) Joe Johnson	1

Semi-finals; Best of 19 frames
(England) Jimmy White	10
(England) John Virgo	4

Last 64; Best of 9 frames
Ray Reardon (WAL)	5
Tommy Murphy (NIR)	1
Alex Higgins (NIR)	5
Doug French (ENG)	3
Murdo MacLeod (SCO)	w/o
Steve Davis (ENG)	w/d
Willie Thorne (ENG)	5
Bert Demarco (SCO)	3
Bill Werbeniuk (CAN)	5
Paddy Morgan (AUS)	3
Jackie Rea (NIR)	w/o
John Bear (CAN)	w/d
Cliff Thorburn (CAN)	5
Paul Medati (ENG)	1
Clive Everton (WAL)	5
Patsy Fagan (IRL)	2
Tony Meo (ENG)	5
Marcus Owen (WAL)	4
Frank Jonik (CAN)	5
Doug Mountjoy (WAL)	3
Eddie Charlton (AUS)	5
Dennis Hughes (ENG)	2
Rex Williams (ENG)	5
Chris Ross (SCO)	0
Tony Knowles (ENG)	5
Pat Houlihan (ENG)	4
Cliff Wilson (WAL)	5
Mario Morra (CAN)	2
Jack Fitzmaurice (ENG)	5
Dessie Sheehan (IRL)	1
Dean Reynolds (ENG)	w/o
David Greaves (ENG)	w/d

Last 32; Best of 9 frames
(Wales) Ray Reardon	5
(Northern Ireland) Alex Higgins	2
(Scotland) Murdo MacLeod	5
(England) Willie Thorne	4
(Canada) Bill Werbeniuk	5
(Northern Ireland) Jackie Rea	2
(Canada) Cliff Thorburn	5
(Wales) Clive Everton	2
(England) Tony Meo	5
(Canada) Frank Jonik	0
(Australia) Eddie Charlton	5
(England) Rex Williams	2
(England) Tony Knowles	4
(Wales) Cliff Wilson	5
(England) Jack Fitzmaurice	0
(England) Dean Reynolds	5

Last 16; Best of 9 frames
(Wales) Ray Reardon	5
(Scotland) Murdo MacLeod	2
(Canada) Bill Werbeniuk	5
(Canada) Cliff Thorburn	2
(England) Tony Meo	3
(Australia) Eddie Charlton	5
(Wales) Cliff Wilson	1
(England) Dean Reynolds	5

Quarter-finals; Best of 9 frames
(Wales) Ray Reardon	5
(Canada) Bill Werbeniuk	3
(Australia) Eddie Charlton	5
(England) Dean Reynolds	1

Semi-finals; Best of 19 frames
(Wales) Ray Reardon	10
(Australia) Eddie Charlton	7

=== Final ===
Final: Best of 19 frames. Astra International Snooker Club, Aston, Birmingham, England, 22 October 1982.
Ray Reardon; Wales	10–5	Jimmy White; England
50–66, 46–59, 90–28, 74–60, 133–0 (132), 9–80, 80–15, 66–7, 29–91, 90–0, 57–66, 69–2, 76–23, 93–17, 60–52
132	Highest break	62
1	Century breaks	0

== Century breaks ==
- 135, 109 – Willie Thorne
- 132 – Ray Reardon
- 126 – John Spencer
- 119 – Terry Griffiths
- 113 – Ian Black
- 112 – Dean Reynolds
- 101 – Bill Werbeniuk
