= 1981–82 snooker world rankings =

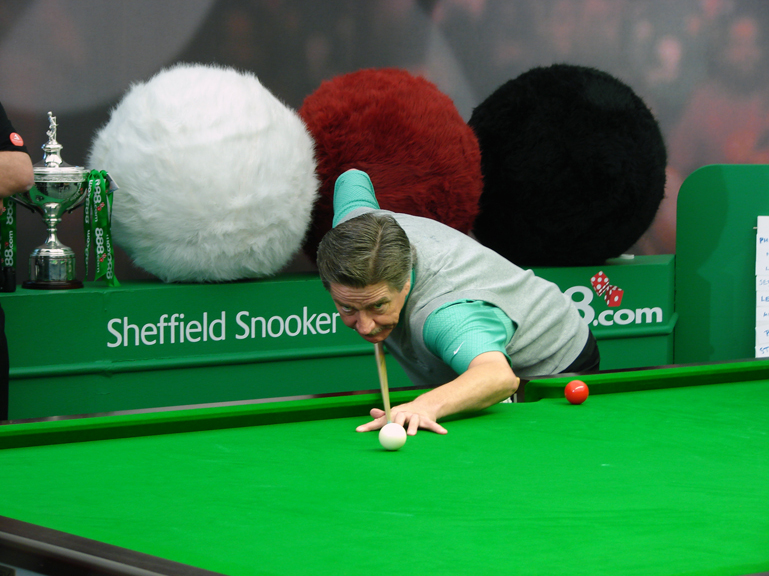
Cliff Thorburn (pictured in 2007) took top place in the rankings.

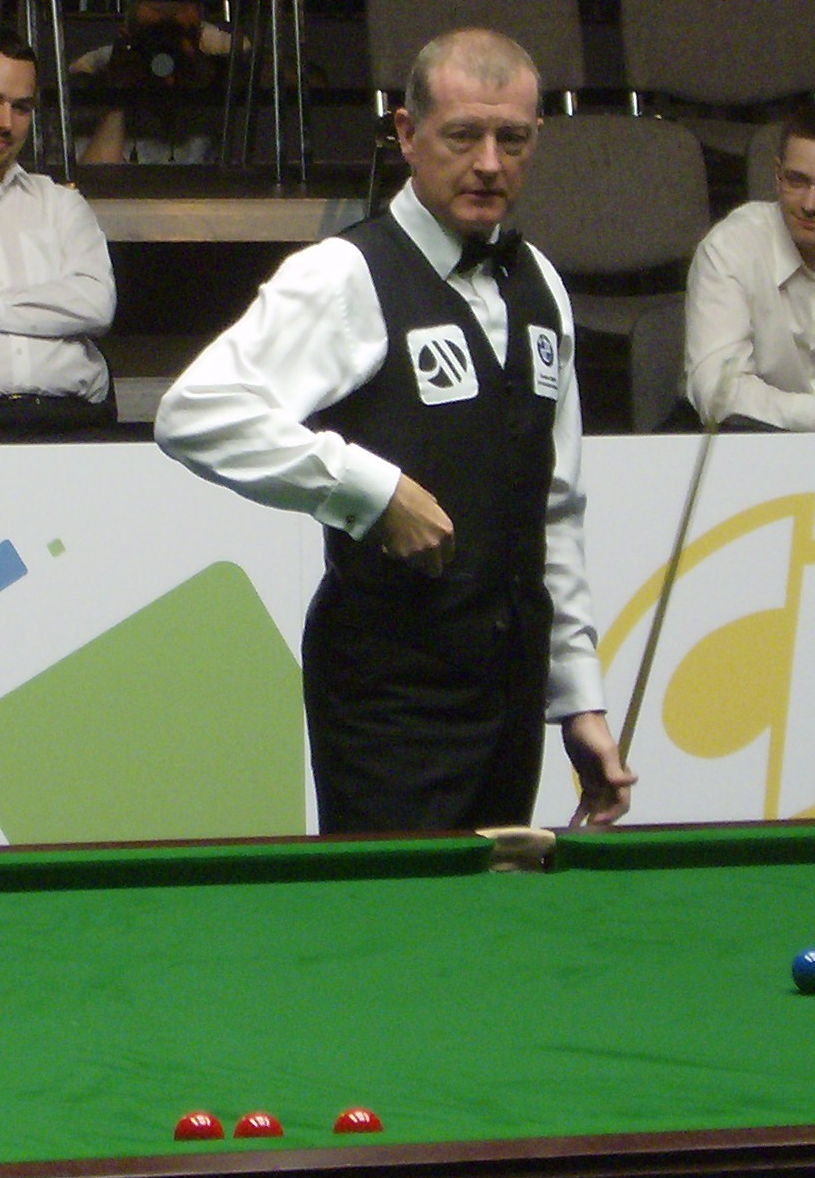
The 1981 World Champion Steve Davis (pictured in 2007) was ranked second.

The World Professional Billiards and Snooker Association (WPBSA), the governing body for professional snooker, first published official world rankings for players on the main tour for the 1976–77 season. Before this, for each tournament the defending champion was seeded first, and the previous year's runner-up second.

Players' performances in the previous three World Snooker Championships (1979, 1980 and 1981) contributed to their points total. For each of the three years, the World Champion gained five points, the runner-up received four, losing semi-finalists got three, losing quarter-finalists got two, and losers in the last-16 round received a single point. Players without any ranking points were listed in order of their performances at the 1981 World Snooker Championship. Cliff Thorburn, the 1980 champion, led the ranking list, with nine points, having been ranked second the previous year. The reigning champion, Steve Davis, held eight points and moved from thirteenth place to second, while the 1979 winner Terry Griffiths, also with eight points, rose from fifth to third. Ray Reardon, who had been ranked first in each of the five previous lists since the establishment of the rankings, was in fourth place with seven points, the same total as Dennis Taylor in fifth. The WPBSA deducted two ranking points from Alex Higgins's total for his behaviour at Herringthorpe Leisure Centre, Rotherham on 24 February 1981. Higgins had arrived late for the second session of an exhibition match against Davis, reportedly because he was playing Space Invaders.

The top sixteen players in the rankings were seeded into the 32-player first round of the main competition for the 1982 World Snooker Championship. Janice Hale, a snooker reporter for The Daily Telegraph, wrote that the system, with points accumulated across three years, gave established players an advantage. An article in Snooker Scene magazine discussing the ranking list for 1980/1981, which was compiled on the same basis as the 1981/1982 list, had also contained concerns about the advantage to established players, while arguing that no better alternative system had been proposed. Player and commentator Jack Karnehm, who had previously criticised the ranking system for not taking into consideration players' performances at tournaments other than the world championship, agreed that no fairer system had been proposed. Karnehm published a "Supreme Snooker League Table" based on percentage of frames won in nine tournaments during the 1980–81 snooker season, which was headed by Steve Davis with 66.67% of frames won across 29 matches, followed by Willie Thorne who won 61.54% of frames in six matches. This method, in Karnehm's own assessment, produced rankings "every bit as unfair and inconsistent as the official ratings list".

== Rankings ==
The professional world rankings for snooker players in the 1981/1982 season are listed below. Points gained in each of the three World Snooker Championships are shown, with the total number of points given in the last column. A "–" symbol indicates that the player did not participate in that year's championship. (Note: The June 1981 issue of Snooker Scene and Chris Turner's Snooker Archive both have Alex Higgins ranked tenth and Kirk Stevens ranked eleventh, but all other sources consulted have them in the order shown in the table)

Snooker world rankings 1981/1982
Ranking	Name	1979	1980	1981	Total
1	Cliff Thorburn (CAN)	1	5	3	9
2	Steve Davis (ENG)	1	2	5	8
3	Terry Griffiths (WAL)	5	1	2	8
4	Ray Reardon (WAL)	2	2	3	7
5	Dennis Taylor (NIR)	4	1	2	7
6	Doug Mountjoy (WAL)	1	1	4	6
7	David Taylor (ENG)	1	3	2	6
8	Eddie Charlton (AUS)	3	2	1	6
9	Bill Werbeniuk (CAN)	2	1	2	5
10	Kirk Stevens (CAN)	1	3	1	5
11	Alex Higgins (NIR)	2	4	1 (Note: Two points were deducted.)	5
12	Fred Davis (ENG)	2	1	1	4
13	John Virgo (ENG)	3	1	0	4
14	John Spencer (ENG)	1	1	1	3
15	Perrie Mans (RSA)	1	1	1	3
16	Graham Miles (ENG)	1	0	1	2
17	Jim Wych (CAN)	–	2	0	2
18	Tony Meo (ENG)	–	0	1	1
19	Ray Edmonds (ENG)	0	0	0	0
20	Tony Knowles (ENG)	–	–	0	0
21	Jimmy White (ENG)	–	–	0	0
22	Willie Thorne (ENG)	0	0	0	0
23	Cliff Wilson (WAL)	–	0	0	0
24	Dave Martin (ENG)	–	–	0	0
25	John Dunning (ENG)	0	0	0	0
26	Jim Meadowcroft (ENG)	0	0	0	0
27	Patsy Fagan (IRL)	0	0	0	0
28	Rex Williams (ENG)	0	0	0	0
29	Mike Hallett (ENG)	–	0	0	0
30	Eddie Sinclair (SCO)	–	0	0	0
31	David Greaves (ENG)	0	0	0	0
32	John Pulman (ENG)	0	0	0	0

Preceded by 1980/1981	1981/1982	Succeeded by 1982/1983
