= 1983 Masters (snooker) =

Professional non-ranking snooker tournament, Jan 1983

1983 Benson & Hedges Masters
Tournament information
- Dates: 23–30 January 1983
- Venue: Wembley Conference Centre
- City: London
- Country: England
- Organisation: WPBSA
- Format: Non-ranking event
- Total prize fund: £55,000
- Winner's share: £16,000
- Highest break: Terry Griffiths (WAL) (128)

Final
- Champion: Cliff Thorburn (CAN)
- Runner-up: Ray Reardon (WAL)
- Score: 9–7

The 1983 Masters (officially the 1983 Benson & Hedges Masters) was a professional non-ranking snooker tournament that took place from Sunday 23 January to Sunday 30 January 1983 at the Wembley Conference Centre in London, England. The event was increased to 16 players and extended from 6 to 8 days. Although there were 16 players, they were not the top 16 ranked players that would compete in the following years. BBC Television coverage did not start until 26 January and so only two of the eight first round matches were televised.

Cliff Thorburn of Canada became the first overseas player to win the competition beating Ray Reardon in the final to win the first of his three titles. The first round match between Bill Werbeniuk and Alex Higgins saw the biggest crowd ever recorded at a snooker match in the UK 2,836 attended the match at the Conference Centre. The highest break of the tournament was 128 made by Terry Griffiths.

== Field ==
For the first time there were 16 players in the event. Alex Higgins, the World Champion was the number 1 seed with Steve Davis, the defending champion seeded 2. Places were allocated to the leading 8 players in the world rankings and there were two sponsors wild-card entries, Jimmy White (ranked 10) and Terry Griffiths (ranked 14). The remaining six players qualified based on their performance in the Professional Players Tournament in October. They were semi-finalist John Virgo, quarter-finalists Joe Johnson, Dean Reynolds and Bill Werbeniuk, and Mark Wildman and Tony Meo who lost in the last 16. Joe Johnson, Dean Reynolds and Mark Wildman were making their debuts in the Masters.

== Main draw ==
Last 16; Best of 9 frames
1	Alex Higgins (NIR)	4
Bill Werbeniuk (CAN)	5
5	Eddie Charlton (AUS)	5
Tony Meo (ENG)	3
6	Kirk Stevens (CAN)	3
Terry Griffiths (WAL)	5
4	Cliff Thorburn (CAN)	5
Joe Johnson (ENG)	2
3	Ray Reardon (WAL)	5
Dean Reynolds (ENG)	1
8	David Taylor (ENG)	2
Jimmy White (ENG)	5
7	Doug Mountjoy (WAL)	5
John Virgo (ENG)	1
2	Steve Davis (ENG)	5
Mark Wildman (ENG)	2

Quarter-finals; Best of 9 frames
(Canada) Bill Werbeniuk	3
5	(Australia) Eddie Charlton	5
(Wales) Terry Griffiths	3
4	(Canada) Cliff Thorburn	5
3	(Wales) Ray Reardon	5
(England) Jimmy White	2
7	(Wales) Doug Mountjoy	5
2	(England) Steve Davis	4

Semi-finals; Best of 11 frames
5	(Australia) Eddie Charlton	5
4	(Canada) Cliff Thorburn	6
3	(Wales) Ray Reardon	6
7	(Wales) Doug Mountjoy	3

Final; Best of 17 frames
4	(Canada) Cliff Thorburn	9
3	(Wales) Ray Reardon	7

== Final ==
Final: Best of 17 frames. Referee: John Smyth; Wembley Conference Centre, London, England, 30 January 1983.
Cliff Thorburn; Canada	9–7	Ray Reardon; Wales
First session: 85–21 (60), 88–30, 1–77, 74–24 (59), 29–63, 57–25, 50–61, 72–44, 97–31, 66–28, 58–69, 74–68 (Thorburn 69, Reardon 54), 34–88 (65), 4–113 (113), 39–76, 77–19 (56)
69	Highest break	113
0	Century breaks	1
4	50+ breaks	3

== Century breaks ==
Total: 4

- 128 – Terry Griffiths
- 114 – Tony Meo
- 113 – Ray Reardon
- 108 – Eddie Charlton
