= 1986 Masters =

1986 Masters may refer to:

- 1986 Masters Tournament, golf
- 1986 Masters (snooker)
- 1986 Nabisco Masters, tennis
