= Bob Chaperon =

Canadian snooker player

Personal information
- Born: 18 May 1958 Sudbury, Ontario, Canada
- Died: 21 November 2026 (aged 68)

Sport
- Country: Canada
- Sport: Snooker
- Professional: 1984–1995, 1998/99, 2000/01, 2002/03
- Highest ranking: 25 (1990/91)

Tournament wins
- Ranking: 1

Robert Chaperon (18 May 1958 – 21 November 2026) was a Canadian professional snooker player.

== Career ==
Chaperon was born on 18 May 1958. He played snooker on the professional tour from 1984 to 1995, and in the 1998/99, 2000/01, 2002/03 seasons, and also participated in the World Snooker Americas Tour in 1998/99, 1999/2000 and 2001/02. He won the 1990 British Open, beating Alex Higgins 10–8 in Higgins' last appearance in a major final. He reached one other ranking quarter-final, at the 1987 Grand Prix. He also won the 1990 World Cup as a member of the Canadian team, and the Canadian Snooker Championship in 1981, defeating Carey Lorraine in Ottawa.

Having not played competitively for about three years, Chaperon resumed in 2007. In October 2019 he won a qualifier for the 2020 World Seniors Championship and although he was due to play in the event at the Crucible Theatre in August 2020, did not participate in the tournament. He finally made his return to the Crucible after 30 years at the 2022 World Seniors Championship, but lost in the last 24 by 3–1 to Philip Williams.

His highest world ranking as a professional was 25.

== Death ==
Chaperon died on 21 November 2026, at the age of 68.

== Performance and rankings timeline ==
Tournament	1983/ 84	1984/ 85	1985/ 86	1986/ 87	1987/ 88	1988/ 89	1989/ 90	1990/ 91	1991/ 92	1992/ 93	1993/ 94	1994/ 95	1998/ 99	2000/ 01	2002/ 03
Ranking	(Note: He was an amateur.)	(Note: New players on the Main Tour do not have a ranking.)	44	53	41	29	29	25	30	40	39	72			
Ranking tournaments
LG Cup (Note: The event ran under different names as the Grand Prix (1984/1985 to 2000/2001).)	A	1R	LQ	2R	QF	2R	1R	1R	1R	LQ	LQ	LQ	LQ	LQ	LQ
British Open	NR	3R	1R	1R	2R	1R	W	1R	1R	LQ	LQ	LQ	LQ	A	LQ
UK Championship	NR	LQ	LQ	1R	1R	1R	2R	1R	2R	LQ	LQ	LQ	LQ	A	LQ
Welsh Open	Tournament Not Held								2R	1R	LQ	LQ	LQ	LQ	LQ
European Open (Note: The event also ran under the name Irish Open (1998/1999).)	Tournament Not Held					1R	2R	1R	1R	1R	LQ	LQ	LQ	NH	LQ
Irish Masters	Non-Ranking Event														LQ
Scottish Open (Note: The event ran under different names such as International Open (1983/1984 to 1984/1985, 1986/1987 to 1996/1997) and the Matchroom Trophy (1985/1986).)	A	LQ	2R	3R	2R	3R	2R	Not Held		2R	LQ	LQ	LQ	LQ	LQ
World Championship	A	LQ	LQ	LQ	1R	1R	LQ	LQ	1R	LQ	LQ	WD	LQ	LQ	LQ
Non-ranking tournaments
The Masters	A	A	A	A	A	A	A	LQ	LQ	A	A	A	A	A	A
Former ranking tournaments
Canadian Masters	NH		Non-Ranking			LQ	Tournament Not Held								
Hong Kong Open	Non-Ranking Event					NH	LQ	Tournament Not Held				NR	Not Held		
Classic	A	LQ	1R	1R	1R	2R	2R	3R	2R	Tournament Not Held					
Dubai Classic	Tournament Not Held					NR	1R	1R	1R	LQ	LQ	LQ	Not Held		
China Open (Note: The event ran under different names as China International (1997/1998 and 1998/1999))	Tournament Not Held												LQ	LQ	NH
Thailand Masters (Note: The event ran under different names such as Asian Open (1989/1990 to 1992/1993) and Thailand Open (1993/1994 to 1996/1997).)	Non-Ranking Event				Not Held		1R	2R	2R	LQ	LQ	LQ	LQ	LQ	NR
Former non-ranking tournaments
Canadian Professional Championship	2R	1R	F	QF	1R	1R	Tournament Not Held								

Performance Table Legend
LQ	lost in the qualifying draw	#R	lost in the early rounds of the tournament (WR = Wildcard round, RR = Round robin)	QF	lost in the quarter-finals
SF	lost in the semi–finals	F	lost in the final	W	won the tournament
DNQ	did not qualify for the tournament	A	did not participate in the tournament	WD	withdrew from the tournament

NH / Not Held	means an event was not held.
NR / Non-Ranking Event	means an event is/was no longer a ranking event.
R / Ranking Event	means an event is/was a ranking event.
MR / Minor-Ranking Event	means an event is/was a minor-ranking event.

== Career finals ==
=== Ranking finals: 1 (1 title) ===
Outcome	No.	Year	Championship	Opponent(s) in the final	Score
Winner	1.	1990	British Open	(Northern Ireland) Alex Higgins	10–8

=== Non-ranking finals: 1 ===
Outcome	No.	Year	Championship	Opponent(s) in the final	Score
Runner-up	1.	1985	Canadian Professional Championship	(Canada) Cliff Thorburn	4–6

=== Team finals: 1 (1 title) ===
Outcome	No.	Year	Championship	Team/partner	Opponent(s) in the final	Score
Winner	1.	1990	World Cup	Canada	Northern Ireland	9–5

=== Amateur finals: 3 (2 titles) ===
Outcome	No.	Year	Championship	Opponent(s) in the final	Score
Winner	1.	1981	Canadian Amateur Championship	(Canada) Carey Lorraine	9–5
Runner-up	1.	2000	Canadian Amateur Championship	(Canada) Kirk Stevens	3–6
Winner	2.	2019	Canadian Amateur Championship (2)	(Canada) Lobsang Lama	6–5
