= 1984 Canadian Professional Championship =

Canadian Professional Championship
Tournament information
- Dates: August 1984
- Venue: Brass Cannon Club
- City: Toronto
- Country: Canada
- Format: Non-ranking event

Final
- Champion: Cliff Thorburn
- Runner-up: Mario Morra
- Score: 9–2

The 1984 Canadian Professional Championship was a professional non-ranking snooker tournament, which took place in August 1984 in Toronto, Canada.

Cliff Thorburn won the title beating Mario Morra 9–2 in the final.

== Main draw ==
Quarter-finals; Best of 11 Frames
Cliff Thorburn	6
Gino Rigitano	1
Frank Jonik	6
Bernie Mikkelsen	3
Mario Morra	6
Jim Wych	4
Kirk Stevens	6
Marcel Gauvreau	2

Semi-finals; Best of 13 Frames
Cliff Thorburn	7
Frank Jonik	3
Mario Morra	7
Kirk Stevens	6

Final; Best of 17 Frames
Cliff Thorburn	9
Mario Morra	2
