= Canadian Professional Championship =

Snooker tournament in Canada (1974–1988)

Tournament information
- Location: Toronto
- Country: Canada
- Established: 1974
- Format: Non-ranking event
- Final year: 1988
- Final champion: Alain Robidoux

The Canadian Professional Championship was a professional snooker tournament which was open only for Canadian players.

== History ==
The championship was first played unofficially in 1974 with Cliff Thorburn winning the title.

The first official Canadian tournament was played in 1983 when the WPBSA offered a subsidy of £1,000 per player to any country holding a professional national championship. Like other similar tournaments in Australia and South Africa, it was discontinued when WPBSA funding was withdrawn after the 1988/89 season.

== Winners ==
Year	Winner	Runner-up	Final score	Season
1980	Cliff Thorburn	Jim Wych	9–6	1979/80
1983	Kirk Stevens	Frank Jonik	9–8	1983/84
1984	Cliff Thorburn	Mario Morra	9–2	1984/85
1985	Cliff Thorburn	Bob Chaperon	6–4	1985/86
1986	Cliff Thorburn	Jim Wych	6–2	1986/87
1987	Cliff Thorburn	Jim Bear	8–4	1987/88
1988	Alain Robidoux	Jim Wych	8–4	1988/89
