= 1981 World Snooker Championship =

Professional snooker tournament

1981 Embassy World Snooker Championship
Tournament information
- Dates: 7–20 April 1981
- Venue: Crucible Theatre
- City: Sheffield
- Country: England
- Organisation: WPBSA
- Format: Ranking event
- Total prize fund: £75,000
- Winner's share: £20,000
- Highest break: Doug Mountjoy (WAL) (145)

Final
- Champion: Steve Davis (ENG)
- Runner-up: Doug Mountjoy (WAL)
- Score: 18–12

The 1981 World Snooker Championship (officially the 1981 Embassy World Snooker Championship) was a ranking professional snooker tournament which took place from 7 April to 20 April 1981 at the Crucible Theatre in Sheffield, England. The tournament was the 1981 edition of the World Snooker Championship, and was the fifth consecutive world championship to take place at the Crucible Theatre since 1977. It was sanctioned by the World Professional Billiards and Snooker Association. The total prize fund for the tournament was £75,000, of which £20,000 went to the winner.

Qualifying rounds for the tournament took place from 23 March to 4 April 1981 at two locations — Redwood Lodge Country Club, near Bristol, and at Romiley Forum, near Stockport. The main stage of the tournament featured 24 players: the top 16 players from the snooker world rankings and another eight players from the qualifying rounds. Jimmy White, Tony Knowles and Dave Martin were debutants at the main stage. The defending champion and top seed in the tournament was Cliff Thorburn, who had defeated Alex Higgins 18–16 in the 1980 final.

Thorburn lost by 10 frames to 16 to Steve Davis in the semi-finals. In the other semi-final, Doug Mountjoy defeated second seed Ray Reardon 16–10. Davis went on to achieve the first of his six world titles, taking a 6–0 lead in the final and winning four consecutive frames at the end of the match to win 18–12. There were 13 century breaks made during the tournament, including a new championship record break of 145 by Mountjoy. The cigarette manufacturer Embassy sponsored the tournament, which received daily coverage on BBC television.

== Overview ==
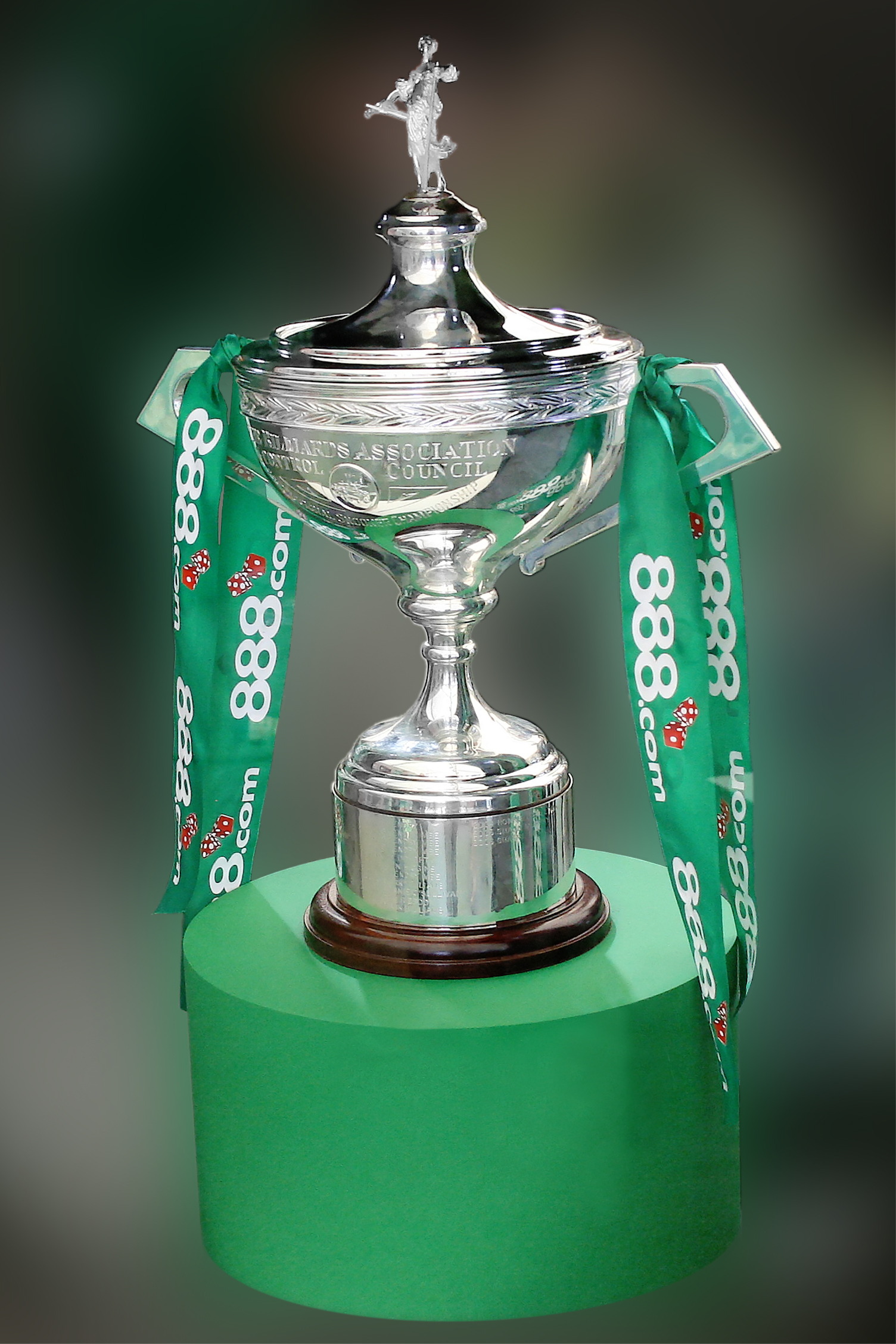
The World Snooker Championship Trophy

The World Snooker Championship is the official world championship of the game of snooker. The first world championship final took place in 1927 at Camkin's Hall, Birmingham, England. Joe Davis won the inaugural title. Each year since 1977, the event has been held at the Crucible Theatre in Sheffield, England.

The 1981 tournament brought together 24 professional snooker players, selected through a mix of the snooker world rankings and a pre-tournament qualification competition. Seedings were based on players' performances in the previous three editions of the world championship. The draw for the event took place on 5 January 1981, in West Bromwich. There were a total of eight qualifying groups, each with one winner meeting a player seeded into the first round, followed by the eight winners of the first-round matches meeting one of eight new players seeded into the second round. Despite not winning any major tournament since the 1978 World Snooker Championship, Ray Reardon was the bookmakers' favourite to win at the time of the draw with bets priced at 3–1. Steve Davis was the second-favourite and priced at 5–1, followed by Terry Griffiths and Alex Higgins both priced at 6–1, and defending champion Cliff Thorburn, who had defeated Higgins 18–16 in the 1980 final, at 10–1. Bookmakers assessed Doug Mountjoy's odds of winning as 20–1. By the time the main event started on 7 April, Davis — who during the season had won his first professional title at the 1980 UK Championship, as well as the 1980 Classic, 1981 Yamaha Organs Trophy and 1981 English Professional Championship — had become the bookmakers' favourite to win, at 7–2.

Mike Watterson promoted the championship tournament, with the authority of the World Professional Billiards and Snooker Association (WPBSA). It was broadcast in the United Kingdom on the BBC, with over 80 hours of programming scheduled. Cigarette company Embassy sponsored the event.

=== Prize money allocation ===
The breakdown of prize money for the 1981 tournament is shown below:

- Winner: £20,000
- Runner-up: £10,000
- Semi-final: £5,000
- Quarter-final: £2,500
- Last 16: £1,800
- Last 24: £875
- Highest break: £1,200
- Maximum break: £10,000
- Total: £75,000

== Tournament rounds ==
=== Qualifying ===
Qualifying matches took place from 23 March to 4 April, and were held at two locations — Redwood Lodge Country Club, near Bristol, and at Romiley Forum, near Stockport. All qualifying matches were scheduled in best-of-17 format with the first player to win nine frames progressing to the next round. Former champion John Pulman lost 2–9 to Dave Martin, who was accepted by the WPBSA as a professional only a few days before entries closed. Chris Ross — who experienced a nervous breakdown in his first year playing professionally after winning the 1976 English Amateur Championship — found that his bridge hand was unsteady, and he was unable to control his cue properly, resulting in his conceding the match to opponent Tony Knowles when 0–7 behind.

=== First round ===
The first-round matches took place from 7 to 10 April and were played as best-of-19 frames. Jimmy White, who turned professional after winning the 1980 World Amateur Championship, made his World Snooker Championship debut at the tournament, as did Tony Knowles and Dave Martin.

Steve Davis made the first century break of the tournament, 119, in the fifth frame of his match against White, while building a 4–2 lead by the end of their first session. He compiled another century, 102, in their second session, and led 8–4 by the end of that session. In the last session, White closed the gap to one frame, but from 9–8 ahead, Davis won the next and prevailed 10–8. Knowles constructed a 101 break in his match against Graham Miles, but lost the match after being tied at 6–6 and 8–8. In the seventeenth frame, at one frame behind, Knowles played a forceful shot on the black, to get a position on the final yellow. He failed to pot the black, which would have left Miles unable to win the frame without Knowles conceding penalty points. Miles won that frame, then took the next to win 10–8.

David Taylor, the 1968 World Amateur Champion, won the first three frames against Cliff Wilson, the 1978 World Amateur Champion, but then lost the next four. Taylor finished the first session 5–4 ahead and went on to defeat Wilson 10–6. Tony Meo was 4–2 ahead, then later 4–5 behind and 7–5 ahead of John Virgo, before securing his progression to the next round 10–6. Meo made a break of 134 during the match. From 5–4, Kirk Stevens won the next five frames to defeat John Dunning 10–4. Doug Mountjoy was a frame ahead of Willie Thorne at 5–4, and extended his lead to 9–4 before winning 10–6. Bill Werbeniuk eliminated Martin 10–4.

Ray Edmonds, twice World Amateur Champion, had never recorded a victory against John Spencer in a significant match and had lost to him twice in the final of the English Amateur Championship, in 1965 and 1966. Edmonds led 5–4 after the first session of their match but then found himself 5–7 behind as Spencer won three consecutive frames. Edmonds equalised the score at 7–7, before Spencer drew ahead again to lead 9–7. Edmonds, aided by fluking a pink ball, won the next two frames to force the match to go to a deciding frame. Jack Karnehm, a snooker commentator and author, later suggested that Spencer was able to win the last frame, in which he made a break of 38, because he had the ability to handle pressure better than Edmonds did.

=== Second round ===
The second-round matches took place from 10 to 14 April and were played as best-of-25 frames. Steve Davis led 6–2 against Alex Higgins after their first session, but in the second session Davis lost five of the eight frames and made only one break over 30. By the end of the session, Davis led by two frames, 9–7. In the third session, Higgins made a break of 47 in the first frame, but Davis responded with a 45 break and won the frame to move into a three-frame lead rather than having only a one-frame advantage, saying afterwards that his 45 was "the most important break [he had] made for months." Higgins won the second frame of the session before Davis won the third with a break of 71. Davis then took the next two frames for a 13–9 victory. Doug Mountjoy took the first four frames, then lost the next four, against Eddie Charlton. Mountjoy went on to lead 9–6, and won 13–7 to reach his first world championship quarter-final since 1977.

Graham Miles only gained a single frame in each of the two sessions against defending champion Cliff Thorburn. He lost the first session 1–7 and the match 2–13. Eight-time former world snooker champion Fred Davis, who was also the reigning world billiards champion, also lost his first session 1–7, and was eliminated 3–13 by David Taylor. Terry Griffiths and Tony Meo finished their first session all-square at 4–4, but Griffiths added nine of the next eleven frames to his tally, and won 13–6.

Dennis Taylor went from 9–11 against Kirk Stevens to progress to the next round with a 13–11 scoreline; he compiled breaks of 135 and 133 during the match. Stevens had been unable to use the practice table at the venue before the match because it was being used to record a programme for a television broadcast. According to Karnehm, Stevens was "frustrated and bitterly hot-tempered when he came out for the second session... his pots missed by fractions, his safety shots would unluckily stay in the open, his judgement was becoming erratic." Bill Werbeniuk led Perrie Mans 6–2 after their first session, and went on to win 13–5. Former champions Ray Reardon and John Spencer were level at 11–11, with Reardon then winning 13–11.

=== Quarter-finals ===
The tournament's quarter-final matches took place from 10 to 12 April and were played as best-of-25 frames. Steve Davis and Terry Griffiths shared the first eight frames, finishing their first session 4–4. After that, Davis pulled ahead to 9–5, Griffiths compiled a break of 100 in the first frame of the third session, making the scoreline 6–9. The players then won alternate frames until Davis took the match 13–9. Snooker historian Clive Everton later wrote that "strongly as the opposition resisted, Davis never really looked like being broken". David Taylor, who had lost to Cliff Thorburn in the semi-finals in 1980, won two of the first three frames in their quarter-final. Taylor took a lead of 4–3, but Thorburn then had the better of the second session, establishing a 10–6 advantage. He eliminated Taylor 13–6. Doug Mountjoy was 5–3 ahead of Dennis Taylor, before falling 5–6 behind, and defeated Taylor 13–8. The highest break of the match was 100, by Thorburn in the 15th frame. Ray Reardon defeated Bill Werbeniuk 13–8, to reach his first semi-final since 1978, and compiled a 112 break in the 16th frame.

=== Semi-finals ===
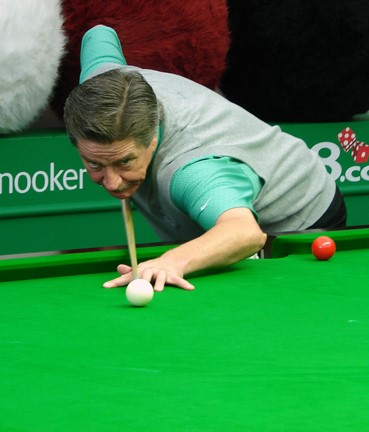
Defending champion Cliff Thorburn (pictured in 2007) lost his semi-final match.

The semi-final matches took place from 17 to 18 April and were played as best-of-31 frames. Doug Mountjoy made a new record world snooker championship break of 145 in the 12th frame against Ray Reardon, pocketing blacks after all reds except the eighth, when he potted the blue. Mountjoy won the match 16–10. Everton's analysis was that whilst in previous matches between the players Reardon had been able to prevail due to his superior tactics, by 1981 Mountjoy's tactical capacity had improved greatly, and his break-building was better than Reardon's.

The second semi-final match, which was played between Davis and Thorburn, was described by Karnehm as the best of the 1981 World Championship. Two weeks before the tournament, Thorburn lost 0–6 to Davis in a challenge match in Romford, Davis's home area. According to Karnehm, Thorburn "was still seething at this result and the remarks of the gloating Romford fans in their own stronghold." According to Karnehm, the players barely acknowledged each other's presence in the first session of the semi-final. Davis went 4–3 ahead of Thorburn after the first session, extending his lead to 6–4 after the break, but went 6–8 behind as Thorburn won four frames in succession, scoring 347 points across these frames to Davis's 35. It was level at 9–9, before Davis won 16–10. In the 22nd frame, Davis was ahead with a score of 80–23 with only the pink and black remaining, leaving Thorburn no realistic chance of winning the frame. However, when Davis offered Thorburn a handshake, the acceptance of which would have been an acknowledgement by Thorburn that the frame was lost, Thorburn declined, started to aim for the pink, and "in an elaborate mockery of the Steve Davis habit, went over to his chair, [and] took a minute sip of water." Thorburn later apologised for this behaviour to Davis and, on television, to the public. In his autobiography, Playing for Keeps (1987), Thorburn wrote that in the third session he had been distracted by Davis's supporters in the arena whistling when he was playing, and that he was frustrated that Davis did nothing to stop this.

=== Final ===
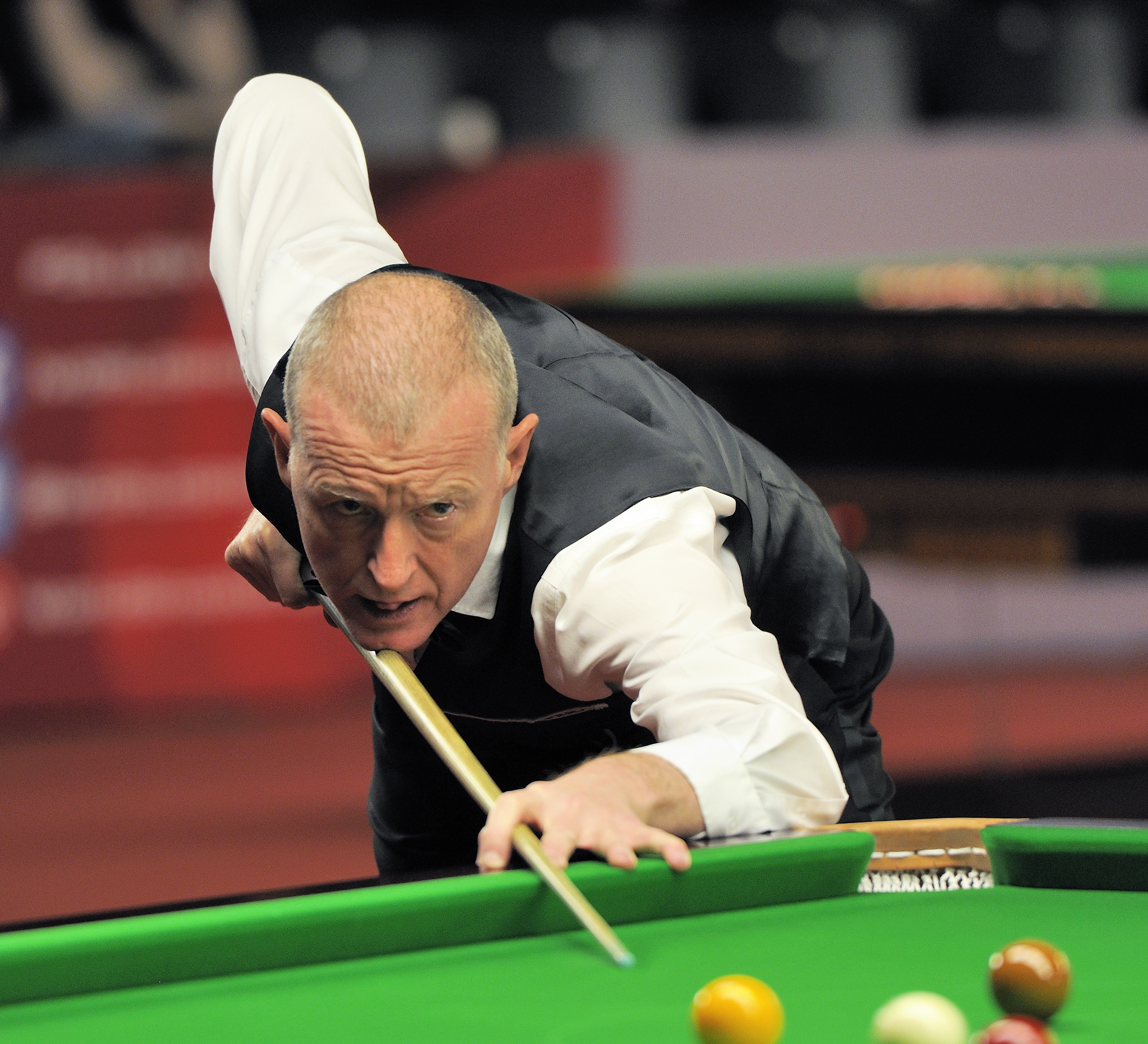
Steve Davis (pictured in 2014) won his first world championship, defeating Doug Mountjoy 18–12.

The final was played across four sessions on 19 and 20 April as a best-of-35 frames match. It was the first world professional snooker championship final for both players, Steve Davis and Doug Mountjoy. Mountjoy led 40–0 in points in the first frame, but Davis made a break of 59 to win the frame. Davis went on to take all of the first six frames, making breaks of 52, 49, 56, and 40. In the eighth frame, Davis was 49–48 ahead with only the last three balls left on the table. The black ball was very close to the pocket, with the blue ball nearby. The two players had a total of 37 turns playing whilst three coloured balls were left, before the frame was abandoned and restarted due to the stalemate. Mountjoy won the restarted frame with a break of 76 – which was the highest of the first session. Mountjoy won the last frame of the first session, leaving Davis 6–3 ahead.

In the second session, Davis won the first frame, then Mountjoy the next two, and Davis took the following one, leaving Davis 8–5 ahead at the mid-session interval. Mountjoy compiled a break of 129, his fourth century of the event, in frame 14, and a couple of frames later, Davis fluked the blue to win the 17th. Mountjoy won the last frame of the second session to finish 8–10 behind.

On the second day of the final, Davis compiled a break of 83 to win the first frame and took the next frame, making it 12–8. Mountjoy then won two consecutive frames to halve Davis's lead. He subsequently won two of the session's last four frames to leave Davis 14–12 ahead of the fourth and final session. Mountjoy led by 46 points in the 24th frame before Davis made a break of 55 to win it. Davis made a break of 84 in the first frame of the fourth session, followed by a break of 119 in the second, and won the next two frames to defeat Mountjoy 18–12. After his win, Davis's manager Barry Hearn ran excitedly into the arena, lifting Davis in celebration. In a post-match interview, Mountjoy said of Davis, "He's the player to beat from now on. The top players are all on a par, but he is a black better."

It was the first of a total of six World Snooker Championship wins for Davis as he dominated the sport in the 1980s, the last of them in 1989. In 1982, the number of players in the main tournament increased to 32; the level of public interest in the 1981 tournament was high enough for the BBC to decide to increase its television coverage to 17 days, the full duration of the championship, in 1982.

== Main draw ==
The tournament ladder and results are shown below. The numbers in brackets to the right of players' names indicate the top 16 seeds, whilst match winners are noted by bold type.

Round 1 Best of 19 frames
Graham Miles (ENG) (16)	10
Tony Knowles (ENG)	8
David Taylor (ENG) (9)	10
Cliff Wilson (WAL)	6
John Virgo (ENG) (12)	6
Tony Meo (ENG)	10
Steve Davis (ENG) (13)	10
Jimmy White (ENG)	8
Doug Mountjoy (WAL) (14)	10
Willie Thorne (ENG)	6
Kirk Stevens (CAN) (11)	10
John Dunning (ENG)	4
Bill Werbeniuk (CAN) (10)	10
Dave Martin (ENG)	4
John Spencer (ENG) (15)	10
Ray Edmonds (ENG)	9

Round 2 Best of 25 frames
Cliff Thorburn (CAN) (1)	13
Graham Miles (ENG) (16)	2
Fred Davis (ENG) (8)	3
David Taylor (ENG) (9)	13
Terry Griffiths (WAL) (5)	13
Tony Meo (ENG)	6
Alex Higgins (NIR) (4)	8
Steve Davis (ENG) (13)	13
Eddie Charlton (AUS) (3)	7
Doug Mountjoy (WAL) (14)	13
Dennis Taylor (NIR) (6)	13
Kirk Stevens (CAN) (11)	11
Perrie Mans (RSA) (7)	5
Bill Werbeniuk (CAN) (10)	13
Ray Reardon (WAL) (2)	13
John Spencer (ENG) (15)	11

Quarter-finals; Best of 25 frames
(Canada) Cliff Thorburn (1)	13
(England) David Taylor (9)	6
(Wales) Terry Griffiths (5)	9
(England) Steve Davis (13)	13
(Wales) Doug Mountjoy (14)	13
(Northern Ireland) Dennis Taylor (6)	8
(Canada) Bill Werbeniuk (10)	10
(Wales) Ray Reardon (2)	13

Semi-finals; Best of 31 frames
(Canada) Cliff Thorburn (1)	10
(England) Steve Davis (13)	16
(Wales) Doug Mountjoy (14)	16
(Wales) Ray Reardon (2)	10

Final; Best of 35 frames
(England) Steve Davis (13)	18
(Wales) Doug Mountjoy (14)	12

=== Final ===
The final was played as a best-of-35 frames match at the Crucible Theatre, Sheffield, on 19 and 20 April 1981, refereed by John Williams. Two sessions were held each day. Davis won the match by 18 frames to 12. Both players compiled one century break during the final; Mountjoy compiled a 129, and Davis made a 119. Davis had a further eight breaks of fifty or more, against two by Mountjoy.

1981 World Snooker Championship final frame scores (Davis first)
19 April afternoon session: 74–40, 71–38, 80–7, 81–1, 92–14, 93–0, 44–77, 9–110, 2–70. Davis led by 6 frames to 3.

19 April evening session: 81–28, 61–62, 47–57, 73–24, 0–129, 89(81)-9, 39–63, 69–43, 49–98. Davis led by 10 frames to 8.

20 April afternoon session: 112–15, 81–34, 29–79, 30–86, 102–9, 15–75, 79–60, 49–57. Davis led by 14 frames to 12.

20 April evening session: 100–32, 119–8, 62–30, 73–36. Davis won by 18 frames to 12.

== Qualifying matches ==
The results from the qualifying competition are shown below with match winners shown in bold type. Qualifying matches were held at Redwood Lodge Country Club, near Bristol, and at Romiley Forum, Stockport.

**First Qualifying Round**; Best of 17 frames
**Willie Thorne (ENG)**	**9**
Mario Morra (CAN)	5
**David Greaves (ENG)**	**9**
Maurice Parkin (ENG)	5
**Jim Meadowcroft (ENG)**	w/o
John Barrie (ENG)	w/d
**Jimmy White (ENG)**	**9**
Bernie Mikkelsen (CAN)	4
**Ray Edmonds (ENG)**	**9**
Mark Wildman (ENG)	3
**Rex Williams (ENG)**	**9**
Sid Hood (ENG)	4
**Tony Meo (ENG)**	**9**
Joe Johnson (ENG)	8
**Mike Hallett (ENG)**	**9**
Frank Jonik (CAN)	1
**John Dunning (ENG)**	**9**
Bernard Bennett (ENG)	6
**Dave Martin (ENG)**	**9**
Ian Anderson (AUS)	3
**Cliff Wilson (WAL)**	**9**
Roy Andrewartha (WAL)	4
**Eddie Sinclair (SCO)**	**9**
Paddy Morgan (AUS)	8
**Tony Knowles (ENG)**	**7**
Chris Ross (SCO) (Note: Ross retired from the match at 0–7)	0

**Second Qualifying Round**; Best of 17 frames
**Willie Thorne (ENG)**	**9**
David Greaves (ENG)	3
Jim Meadowcroft (ENG)	8
**Jimmy White (ENG)**	**9**
**Ray Edmonds (ENG)**	**9**
Rex Williams (ENG)	7
**Tony Meo (ENG)**	**9**
Mike Hallett (ENG)	4
Patsy Fagan (IRL)	7
**John Dunning (ENG)**	**9**
John Pulman (ENG)	2
**Dave Martin (ENG)**	**9**
**Cliff Wilson (WAL)**	**9**
Eddie Sinclair (SCO)	4
Jim Wych (CAN)	3
**Tony Knowles (ENG)**	**9**

== Century breaks ==
There were 13 century breaks during the championship, equalling the record from 1979. Mountjoy set a World Championship record by compiling a 145 break, surpassing the 142 breaks by Rex Williams in 1965 and Bill Werbeniuk in 1979. Mountjoy earned a £5,000 bonus for his achievement, and his record stood until the 1983 tournament, when Thorburn compiled a maximum break.

- 145, 129, 110 — Doug Mountjoy
- 135, 133 — Dennis Taylor
- 134 — Tony Meo
- 119, 119, 106 — Steve Davis
- 112 — Ray Reardon
- 101 — Tony Knowles
- 100 — Terry Griffiths
- 100 — Cliff Thorburn
