= 1986 Scottish Masters =

Tournament information
- Dates: 18–21 September 1986
- Venue: Hospitality Inn
- City: Glasgow
- Country: Scotland
- Organisation: WPBSA
- Format: Non-ranking event
- Total prize fund: £40,000
- Winner's share: £13,000
- Highest break: Alex Higgins (NIR) (131)

Final
- Champion: Cliff Thorburn (CAN)
- Runner-up: Alex Higgins (NIR)
- Score: 9–8

The 1986 Langs Supreme Scottish Masters was a professional non-ranking snooker tournament that took place between 18 and 21 September 1986 at the Hospitality Inn in Glasgow, Scotland.

Cliff Thorburn retained the title by defeating Alex Higgins 9–8 in the final. At the same match, Higgins won £1,000 for the highest break of the championship with 131, which was made in the final.

The event was played at the same time as the Matchroom Professional Championship which involved six players from the Matchroom Sport stable, including Steve Davis.

== Prize fund ==
The breakdown of prize money for this year is shown below:

- Winner: £13,000
- Runner-up: £8,000
- Semi-final: £4,000
- Quarter-final: £2,500
- Highest break: £1,000
- Total: £40,000

== Tournament draw ==
Quarter-finals; Best of 9 frames
Cliff Thorburn (CAN)	5
John Parrott (ENG)	1
Jimmy White (ENG)	5
Stephen Hendry (SCO)	1
Alex Higgins (NIR)	5
Joe Johnson (ENG)	2
Kirk Stevens (CAN)	5
Tony Knowles (ENG)	3

Semi-finals; Best of 11 frames
(Canada) Cliff Thorburn	6
(England) Jimmy White	2
(Northern Ireland) Alex Higgins	6
(Canada) Kirk Stevens	2

Final; Best of 17 Frames
(Canada) Cliff Thorburn	9
(Northern Ireland) Alex Higgins	8
