= 1985 Scottish Masters =

Tournament information
- Dates: 19–22 September 1985
- Venue: Hospitality Inn
- City: Glasgow
- Country: Scotland
- Organisation: WPBSA
- Format: Non-ranking event
- Total prize fund: £31,000
- Winner's share: £10,500
- Highest break: Cliff Thorburn (CAN) (142)

Final
- Champion: Cliff Thorburn (CAN)
- Runner-up: Willie Thorne (ENG)
- Score: 9–7

The 1985 Langs Supreme Scottish Masters was a professional non-ranking snooker tournament that took place between 19 and 22 September 1985 at the Hospitality Inn in Glasgow, Scotland. Total prize money was £31,000 with a first prize of £10,500.

Cliff Thorburn won the tournament by defeating Willie Thorne 9–7 in the final. Thorburn also won the high break prize of £500 for his break of 142 in the semi-finals against Silvino Francisco.

== Tournament draw ==
Quarter-finals; Best of 9 frames
Cliff Thorburn (CAN)	5
Murdo MacLeod (SCO)	1
Silvino Francisco (RSA)	5
Tony Knowles (ENG)	4
Willie Thorne (ENG)	5
Dennis Taylor (NIR)	2
Jimmy White (ENG)	5
Alex Higgins (NIR)	0

Semi-finals; Best of 11 frames
(Canada) Cliff Thorburn	6
(South Africa) Silvino Francisco	0
(England) Willie Thorne	6
(England) Jimmy White	2

Final; Best of 17 Frames
(Canada) Cliff Thorburn	9
(England) Willie Thorne	7
