= 1986 Masters (snooker) =

Professional non-ranking snooker tournament, Jan/Feb 1986

1986 Benson & Hedges Masters
Tournament information
- Dates: 26 January – 2 February 1986
- Venue: Wembley Conference Centre
- City: London
- Country: England
- Organisation: WPBSA
- Format: Non-ranking event
- Total prize fund: £175,000
- Winner's share: £45,000
- Highest break: Willie Thorne (ENG) (138)

Final
- Champion: Cliff Thorburn (CAN)
- Runner-up: Jimmy White (ENG)
- Score: 9–5

The 1986 Masters (officially the 1986 Benson & Hedges Masters) was a professional non-ranking snooker tournament that took place between 26 January and 2 February 1986 at the Wembley Conference Centre in London, England. The top 16 ranked players took part in the competition.

Cliff Thorburn made history in the competition, when he became the first player to retain the title by defeating Jimmy White 9–5 in the final. It was also Thorburn's third and last Masters title.

Earlier in the tournament the last 16 match between Eddie Charlton and Kirk Stevens, which took place on the afternoon of 28 January, had to stop play at 19:20 when the players were level at 4–4 to make way for that day's evening match between Jimmy White and Tony Meo, which was due to start at 19:30. That match started an hour later due to a settling crowd. The White/Meo ended 5–4 to the Whirlwind and then the Charlton/Stevens match resumed just after midnight with Charlton taking the last frame to a 5–4 win, taking him to play Tony Knowles in the quarter-finals, which he lost in another final frame decider 4–5. This was to be Charlton's last Masters appearance as he lost his top 16 place at the end of the season. The same happened with David Taylor too, who lost against Steve Davis in the last 16.

== Field ==
Defending champion Cliff Thorburn was the number 1 seed with World Champion Dennis Taylor seeded 2. The remaining places were allocated to the top 16 players in the world rankings. Silvino Francisco was making his debut in the Masters.

== Main draw ==
Last 16; Best of 9 frames
1	Cliff Thorburn (CAN)	5
16	Joe Johnson (ENG)	3
8	Terry Griffiths (WAL)	5
9	Alex Higgins (NIR)	4
5	Kirk Stevens (CAN)	4
12	Eddie Charlton (AUS)	5
4	Tony Knowles (ENG)	5
13	Silvino Francisco (RSA)	1
3	Steve Davis (ENG)	5
14	David Taylor (ENG)	4
6	Ray Reardon (WAL)	4
11	Willie Thorne (ENG)	5
7	Jimmy White (ENG)	5
10	Tony Meo (ENG)	4
2	Dennis Taylor (NIR)	5
15	Doug Mountjoy (WAL)	2

Quarter-finals; Best of 9 frames
1	(Canada) Cliff Thorburn	5
8	(Wales) Terry Griffiths	2
12	(Australia) Eddie Charlton	4
4	(England) Tony Knowles	5
3	(England) Steve Davis	5
11	(England) Willie Thorne	4
7	(England) Jimmy White	5
2	(Northern Ireland) Dennis Taylor	3

Semi-finals; Best of 11 frames
1	(Canada) Cliff Thorburn	6
4	(England) Tony Knowles	4
3	(England) Steve Davis	3
7	(England) Jimmy White	6

Final; Best of 17 frames
1	(Canada) Cliff Thorburn	9
7	(England) Jimmy White	5

== Final ==
Final: Best of 17 frames. Referee: John Street; Wembley Conference Centre, London, England, 2 February 1986.
Cliff Thorburn; Canada	9–5	Jimmy White; England
First session: 35–68, 75–29, 68–25, 70–27, 21–90 (75), 69–14, 61–52, 9–65, 63–53 (Thorburn 61, White 53), 56–69, 12–76, 73–16, 65–60 (Thorburn 52, White 59), 68–33
61	Highest break	75
0	Century breaks	0
2	50+ breaks	3

== Century breaks ==
Total: 5

- 138, 110 – Willie Thorne
- 132 – Steve Davis
- 106 – Jimmy White
- 101 – Eddie Charlton
