= Cliff Thorburn =

Canadian snooker player (born 1948)

Cliff Thorburn CM
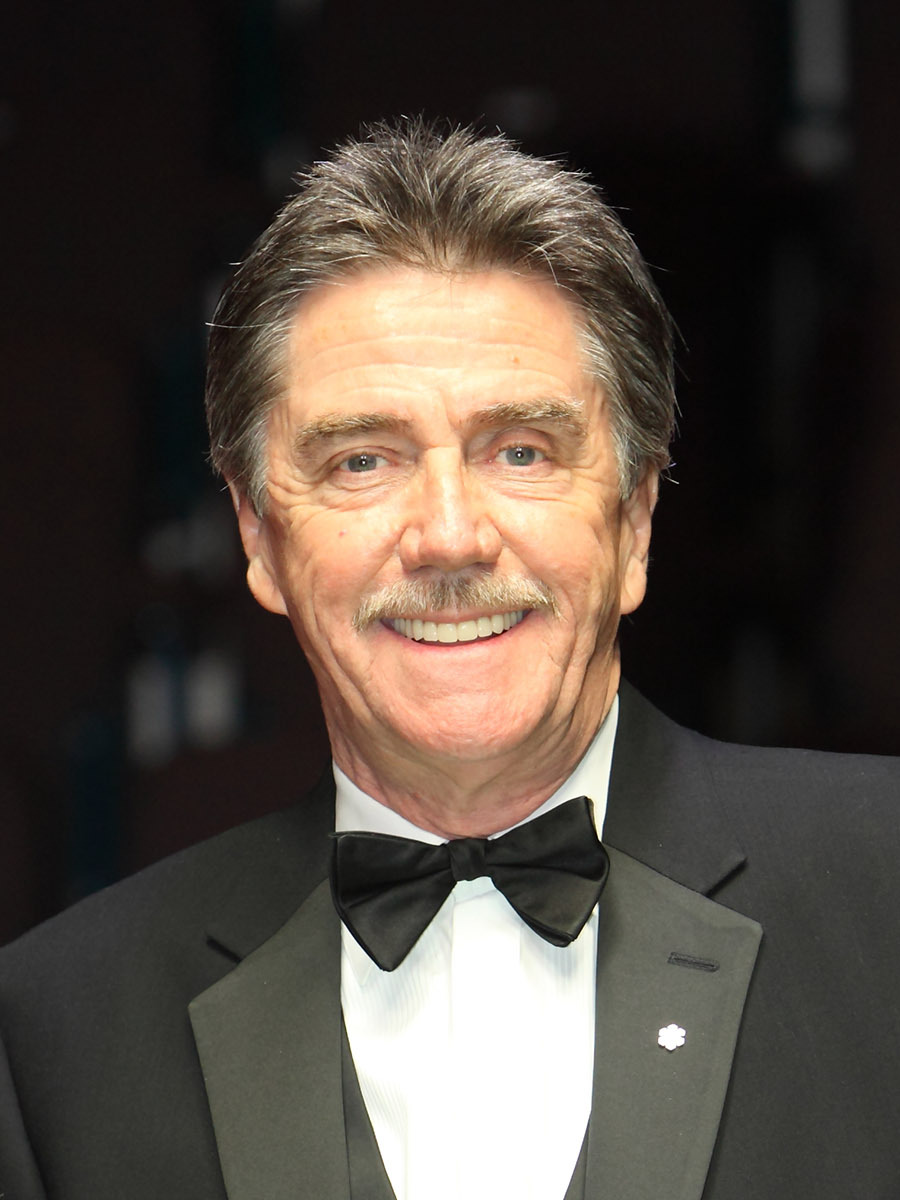
- Thorburn in 2010

Personal information
- Nickname: The Grinder
- Born: 16 January 1948 (age 78) Victoria, British Columbia, Canada

Sport
- Country: Canada
- Sport: Snooker
- Professional: 1972–1996
- Highest ranking: 1 (1981/82)
- Maximum breaks: 2

Tournament wins
- Ranking: 2
- World Championship: 1980

Clifford Charles Devlin Thorburn (born 16 January 1948) is a Canadian retired professional snooker player. Nicknamed "The Grinder" because of his slow, determined style of play, he won the World Snooker Championship in 1980, defeating Alex Higgins 18–16 in the final. He is generally recognised as the sport's first world champion from outside the United Kingdom—since Australian Horace Lindrum's 1952 title is usually disregarded—and he remains the only world champion from the Americas. He was runner-up in two other world championships, losing 21–25 to John Spencer in the 1977 final and 6–18 to Steve Davis in the 1983 final. At the 1983 tournament, Thorburn became the first player to make a maximum break in a World Championship match, achieving the feat in his second-round encounter with Terry Griffiths.

Ranked world number one during the 1981–82 season, Thorburn was the first non-British player to top the snooker world rankings. He won the invitational Masters in 1983, 1985, and 1986, making him the first player to win the tournament three times and the first to retain the title. He retired from the main professional tour in 1996. Inducted into Canada's Sports Hall of Fame in 2001 and the Snooker Hall of Fame in 2014, he competed later in his career in Snooker Legends events and on the World Seniors Tour, winning the 2018 Seniors Masters at the Crucible Theatre at age 70. He retired from competitive snooker after the 2022 UK Seniors Championship.

== Early life ==
Thorburn was born on 16 January 1948 in Victoria, British Columbia. His parents separated when he was eighteen months old. He was abandoned by his mother, and after spending about two years in an orphanage during a custody dispute, was raised by his father and his paternal grandmother. He was told that his mother had died, but, aged twenty, learnt that she was still alive.

Thorburn played pool and lacrosse in his youth, and set a one-game scoring record of ten goals in the Greater Victoria Minor Lacrosse Association "midget division" in 1958. He left school at the age of 16, and travelled across Canada playing pool and snooker money matches, taking jobs as a dishwasher and working on a garbage truck to help earn money for his stakes. In 1968 he entered his first tournaments, and won the Toronto City Championship. He spent time with Fred Davis and Rex Williams when they toured Canada in 1970, and afterwards became a resident professional at the House of Champions club in Toronto.

In July 1970, Thorburn reportedly made a maximum break of 147 in a non-competitive game against Fred Hardwick. He made six century breaks in winning the North American Amateur Championship in 1971, equalling the record, jointly held by Joe Davis and George Chenier, for most century breaks in a single tournament.

== Early professional career ==
Thorburn played John Spencer in a series of three exhibition matches in 1971; although he lost all three, he was recommended by Spencer to the World Professional Billiards and Snooker Association, and he was accepted as a professional in 1972. Thorburn travelled to England in 1973, and on the day of his arrival, the reigning world snooker champion Alex Higgins offered to play him for £5 a frame. Thorburn, receiving 28 points start in each frame, claims to have beaten Higgins in every frame they played, and that Higgins refused to pay up.

At the 1973 World Snooker Championship, his first major tournament on the professional snooker circuit, Thorburn defeated Dennis Taylor 9–8 in the first round then lost 15–16 to Williams in the second round. Later that year, he had a 4–0 win over Pat Houlihan at the 1973 Norwich Union Open before losing 2–4 to Higgins in the quarter-final. In the 1974 World Snooker Championship he defeated Alex McDonald 8–3 in qualifying then lost 4–8 to Paddy Morgan in the first round. He started the 1974–75 snooker season with a victory in the 1974 Canadian Open, knocking out Willie Thorne and Graham Miles to reach the final, where he won 8–6 against Taylor. He reached the quarter-finals of the 1975 World Snooker Championship with wins over Morgan and Miles, losing the quarter-final 12–19 to Eddie Charlton, and, the following year, was eliminated 14–15 by Higgins in the first round of the 1976 World Snooker Championship.

The 1977 World Snooker Championship was the first to be held at the Crucible Theatre in Sheffield. Thorburn became the first Canadian world snooker championship finalist. He whitewashed Chris Ross 11–0 in qualifying, then recorded a 13–6 win over Williams. In the quarter-final, he won in the deciding frame, 13–12, against Charlton. He overcame Taylor 18–16 in the semi-final, and twelve hours later was facing Spencer in the final. Spencer built a 4–2 lead at the end of the first session, but Thorburn won four of the next six frames and they finished the second session level at 6–6. Thorburn took the first two frames of the third session, and it finished with them level again, at 9–9. Thorburn built a 13–11 lead during the fourth session, and extended it to 15–11 before Spencer won four consecutive frames to make it 15–15; the next session again saw them share the frames, finishing at 18–18. Spencer won three frames in a row to lead 21–18, and Thorburn took the next two to trail by a single frame. Spencer took the last frame of the session, leading 22–20. In the last session, Thorburn again narrowed the gap to one frame, but then Spencer won three in a row to achieve victory at 25–21.

Thorburn reached the final of the 1978 Masters with wins over Doug Mountjoy and Spencer, losing 5–7 to Higgins in the final. He was knocked out of the 1978 World Snooker Championship by Charlton, 12–13 in the quarter-finals. In the 1978–79 snooker season he defeated Tony Meo 17–15 in the final to win the 1978 Canadian Open after having trailed 6–10 at the end of the first day of the final, but lost his opening matches in both the Masters (4–5 to Perrie Mans) and the World Championship (10–13 to John Virgo). He retained his Canadian Open title in 1979, taking a 10–3 lead over Terry Griffiths before winning the match in the deciding frame, at 17–16.

== 1980s ==
=== 1980 world snooker champion ===
Thorburn had defeated Virgo 6–1 in the round robin phase of the 1980 Bombay International, but lost 7–13 to him in the final. He won 5–3 against Virgo in the first round of the 1980 Masters, then lost 3–5 to Griffiths in the quarter-final. In advance of the 1980 World Championship, he practiced at a club near the Crucible that was owned by a friend, and gave up smoking and drinking alcohol for a week before the tournament. His first match was against Mountjoy, Thorburn finishing their first session behind 3–5. In the evening, he played cards and drank alcohol with friends until 5:00 am, resuming the match the next day by winning the first five frames in succession. Thorburn won the match 13–10. In the quarter-final, he beat Jim Wych 13–6, having led 5–3, and 10–6. He led David Taylor 5–3 after their first semi-final session, and 11–4 at the end of the second. In the last session of the match, Thorburn extended his lead to 15–7 by the mid-session interval, then won 16–7 with a break of 114 in the 23rd frame, becoming the first player to reach a second final at the Crucible.

His opponent in the final was Higgins, the 1972 champion. Thorburn won the first frame, and Higgins won the next five. Thorburn won the seventh to make it 5–2, Higgins complaining after the frame that Thorburn had been standing in his line of sight, a claim that author and sports statistician Ian Morrison called "unfounded". Higgins led 6–3 at the end of the first session, extending this to 9–5 before Thorburn levelled the match at 9–9. Writing in The Times, Sydney Friskin described the match to this point as a contrast of styles: "the shrewd cumulative processes of Thorburn against the explosive break-building of Higgins". He also noted that each player had accused the other of distracting them during the match. Thorburn won the 19th and 20th frames, Higgins taking the following two to level at 11–11. Thorburn went ahead at 12–11 and 13–12, Higgins levelling the match both times, and the third session ending 13–13.

In the final session, Higgins won the first frame then Thorburn won the next two, before Higgins equalized at 15–15. Thorburn led 16–15, and missed an easy brown ball that let Higgins in to make it 16–16. With a break of 119, Thorburn moved within a frame of victory at 17–16. In the 34th frame, leading 45–9 in points, he laid a snooker for Higgins, and made a 51 break after that to win the title. The BBC's television coverage of the final had been interrupted by the broadcast of live footage of the Iranian Embassy Siege. The conclusion of the final was watched by 14.5 million television viewers. Thorburn is generally regarded as the first player from outside the United Kingdom to win the world championship, Horace Lindrum's victory in the 1952 World Snooker Championship usually being disregarded. (Note: Following a dispute over money between professional players and the Billiards Association and Control Council (BA&CC), the players decided to organize the 1952 World Professional Match-play Championship. The only players to enter the BA&CC's 1952 World Snooker Championship were Lindrum and Clark McConachy. According to Clive Everton, it was the World Professional Match-play Championship that was "recognised by the public as the genuine article".) After the match, Higgins said of Thorburn "he's a grinder", and the nickname "The Grinder" was subsequently associated with Thorburn, seen as apt for his slow, determined style of play. Thorburn has aspired to be known by the nickname "Champagne Cliff", but admitted later that it never caught on.

He won the Canadian Open for a third successive year in 1980, defeating Griffiths 17–10 in the final, and was part of the Canada Team that reached the final of the 1980 World Challenge Cup, where they lost 5–8 to Wales. He led Higgins 5–1 in the semi-final of the 1981 Masters, but lost the match 5–6. At the 1981 World Championship, as defending champion, he reached the semi-final where he lost 10–16 to Steve Davis. Following a 4–10 loss to Jimmy White in the first round of the 1982 World Snooker Championship, Thorburn decided to return to Canada. Thorburn had been number two in the 1980/1981 world rankings, and reached number one in the 1981/1982 rankings. He won the 1983 Masters, recovering from 2–5 against Charlton to win 6–5 in the semi-final, and defeating Ray Reardon 9–7 in the final.

=== 1983 world championship maximum break ===
In 1983, Thorburn became the first player to make a maximum break at the World Championship, during the fourth frame of his second-round match against Griffiths, and only the second player to make an official maximum in professional competition (after Davis at the 1982 Classic). Thorburn started the break by fluking a red. While he was completing the break, play stopped on the tournament's second table because his friend and fellow Canadian Bill Werbeniuk wanted to watch. The match against Griffiths ended at 3:51 am, Thorburn emerging as the winner, 13–12. He then defeated Kirk Stevens 13–12 (from 10–12) in the quarter-final, and Tony Knowles 16–15 (from 13–15) in the semi-final. During the semi-final, which finished at 12:45 am, Thorburn learnt that his wife Barbara had suffered a miscarriage on the day of his maximum break. He played Steve Davis in the final. From 2–2 after the first four frames, Davis won four in a row to leave Thorburn behind 2–6, extending this to 2–9 at the start of the second session, and 5–12 at the end of the first day. Davis wrapped up victory on the second day, at 18–6, this being the first final at the Crucible to be completed in only three sessions. Commenting on Thorburn's performance in the final, snooker historian Clive Everton observed that the long matches he had played in reaching the final had "left him so drained ... that he was able to offer only token resistance."

=== 1984 to 1989 ===
Thorburn enjoyed a resurgence in form during the 1984–85 season. He reached the final of the Grand Prix, where he lost to Dennis Taylor 2–10. In the semi-final, Thorburn had defeated the reigning world champion Steve Davis 9–7. He also reached the final of the Classic in January 1985, where he met Thorne, the latter winning five frames in a row to win 13–8 after the pair had been tied at 8–8. Thorburn was again runner-up in the 1986 Classic, this time losing to Jimmy White in the final 12–13. Thorburn fluked a pot on the green ball in the deciding frame, to leave White requiring snookers to win. White potted the brown and blue, then laid a snooker on the pink. Thorburn failed to hit the pink, which gave White the points he needed, and White then potted the pink and black to win the title.

He won further Masters titles by defeating Mountjoy 9–6 in 1985, and White 9–5 in 1986. He became the first player ever to retain the Masters title, and the first to win it three times. Thorburn experienced success in the Scottish Masters, an invitational event which opened the snooker season, in 1985 and 1986. He defeated Thorne 9–7 in the 1985 final, and Alex Higgins 9–8 the following year. He won the opening ranking event in the 1985–86 snooker calendar, the Matchroom Trophy, where he beat Jimmy White in the final 12–10, having trailed 0–7. He was then runner-up in the corresponding event the following two seasons, 9–12 to Neal Foulds in 1986, and 5–12 to Davis in 1987.

In 1988 Thorburn was fined £10,000, had two ranking points deducted, and was banned for two ranking tournaments, by the World Professional Billiards and Snooker Association. The Association's disciplinary committee had decided that Thorburn had brought the sport into disrepute, as a drug test that he took at the 1988 British Open showed that he had "minute traces of cocaine in his urine sample". He compiled another maximum break in the 1989 Matchroom League, during a match against White.

== Later years ==
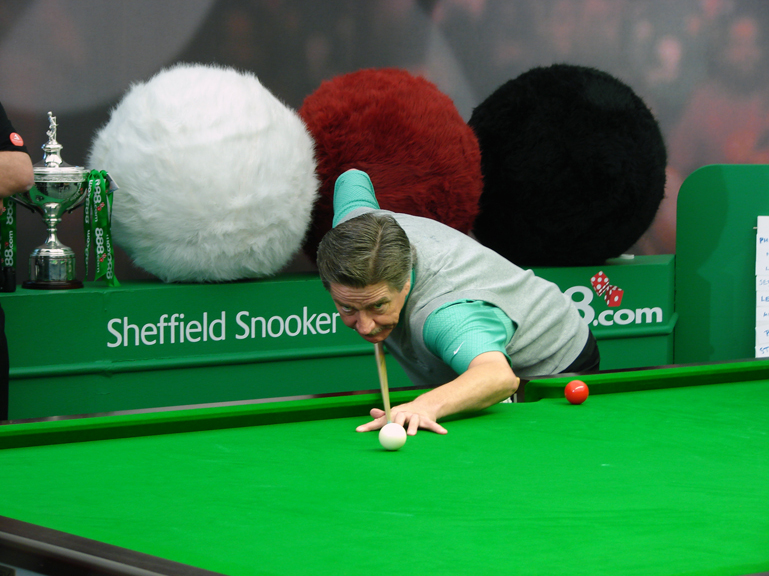
Thorburn in 2007

Thorburn last qualified for the World Championship in 1994, where he faced Nigel Bond in the first round. Thorburn led by 9–2 but eventually lost 9–10. At the 1995 Thailand Open, ranked 54th, he defeated three players from the top 16, including second-ranked Steve Davis, to reach the semi-finals. It was the first time he had reached this stage of a major event since the 1991 European Open. He lost the semi-final 0–5 to Ronnie O'Sullivan.

Thorburn effectively retired from the professional tournament circuit after the 1995–96 season. Ranked 91st, and having not entered for any ranking tournaments in the 1996–97 season, he was quoted as saying that when he realized he would have to take part in tournament qualifying rounds for several weeks, "I just couldn't accept that ... When you've played at all of the major venues in front of capacity crowds, it's hard to focus and get motivated playing with just one man and a dog watching." He played for Canada in the 1996 World Cup, where his team reached the quarter-finals.

Thorburn won over one million pounds in prize money during the course of his professional career. Playing as an amateur again, he won the Canadian Amateur Championship in 2001; he had previously won the tournament in 1974, 1975, 1976, and 1977. During the 2006 World Championship, he flew to Sheffield to unveil a life-size painting of the maximum break that he made at the tournament in 1983. Painted by the artist Michael Myers, the work is on display at the Macdonald St. Paul's Hotel in Sheffield. Thorburn competed on the inaugural Snooker Legends Tour in 2010.

At the age of 70, Thorburn won the 2018 Seniors Masters at the Crucible Theatre, defeating Jonathan Bagley 2–0 in the final. Shortly before turning 74, he announced that the 2022 UK Seniors Championship would be his last competitive event. Thorburn played his last competitive match on 5 January 2022 against Kuldesh Johal, losing 0–3.

== Personal life ==
Thorburn is the father of one son and one daughter, the latter of whom is transgender. Following his World Championship victory, he bought a house in England with the intention of spending more time in Britain. His manager Darryl McKerrow was killed in a hunting accident during the 1984–85 season, and Thorburn was subsequently managed by Robert Windsor, until joining Barry Hearn's Matchroom Sport in January 1988. Thorburn was made a Member of the Order of Canada in 1984. He was added to the BC Sports Hall of Fame in 1995, and inducted into Canada's Sports Hall of Fame in 2001.

His instruction book, Cliff Thorburn's Snooker Skills, was published in 1987 by Hamlyn, and his autobiography, Playing for Keeps, co-written with Clive Everton, was published by Partridge Press in the same year. Thorburn is the head coach for cue sports at the Canadian Billiards and Snooker Association, director of coaching and an ambassador for the Pan American Billiards & Snooker Association, and a member of the World Professional Billiards and Snooker Association International Expert Coaching Advisory Panel.

== Performance and rankings timeline ==
Tournament	1972/ 73	1973/ 74	1974/ 75	1975/ 76	1976/ 77	1977/ 78	1978/ 79	1979/ 80	1980/ 81	1981/ 82	1982/ 83	1983/ 84	1984/ 85	1985/ 86	1986/ 87	1987/ 88	1988/ 89	1989/ 90	1990/ 91	1991/ 92	1992/ 93	1993/ 94	1994/ 95	1995/ 96	Ref.
Ranking	No ranking system				13	6	5	5	2	1	3	3	3	2	2	4	6	7	18	36	36	41	54	41	
Ranking tournaments
Thailand Classic (Note: The event was also called the Dubai Masters (1988/1989) and Dubai Classic (1989/1990–1994/1995).)	Tournament not held																NR	A	1R	1R	1R	LQ	LQ	LQ	
Grand Prix (Note: The event was also called the Professional Players Tournament (1982/1983–1983/1984).)	Tournament not held										3R	QF	F	SF	1R	2R	A	2R	1R	1R	LQ	LQ	1R	LQ	
UK Championship	Non-ranking event												SF	3R	QF	QF	QF	2R	WD	1R	LQ	LQ	LQ	LQ	
German Open	Tournament not held																							LQ	
Welsh Open	Tournament not held																			1R	LQ	LQ	LQ	LQ	
International Open (Note: The event was also called the Goya Matchroom Trophy (1985/1986).)	Tournament not held									NR	2R	F	1R	W	F	F	A	1R	Not held		LQ	2R	1R	LQ	
European Open	Tournament not held																QF	1R	SF	2R	1R	LQ	LQ	LQ	
Thailand Open (Note: The event was also called the Thailand Masters (1983/1984–1986/1987 & 1991/1992) and the Asian Open (1989/1990–1992/1993).)	Tournament not held											Non-ranking event				Not held		1R	1R	LQ	LQ	1R	SF	WD	
British Open (Note: The event was also called the British Gold Cup (1979/1980), Yamaha Organs Trophy (1980/1981) and International Masters (1981/1982–1983/1984).)	Tournament not held							Non-ranking event					3R	3R	SF	SF	3R	1R	1R	1R	LQ	1R	LQ	LQ	
World Championship	NR	1R	QF	1R	F	QF	1R	W	SF	1R	F	QF	QF	SF	1R	SF	1R	QF	LQ	LQ	LQ	1R	LQ	LQ	
Non-ranking tournaments
Australian Masters (Note: The event was also called the Hong Kong Open (1989/1990) and Australian Open (1994/1995).)	Tournament not held							A	A	A	RR	W	1R	A	A	QF	NH	R	Tournament not held				A	A	
Scottish Masters	Tournament not held									F	A	SF	QF	W	W	SF	NH	QF	A	A	A	A	A	A	
The Masters	Not held		1R	1R	A	F	QF	QF	SF	QF	W	1R	W	W	SF	QF	QF	1R	A	LQ	A	A	A	A	
Irish Masters (Note: The event was also called the Benson & Hedges Ireland Tournament (1974/1975–1976/1977).)	Not held		A	A	A	A	A	RR	SF	QF	A	QF	QF	SF	QF	QF	1R	1R	A	A	A	A	A	A	
European League (Note: The event was also called the Matchroom League (1978/1979–1980/1981).)	Tournament not held											A	Not held		RR	RR	RR	RR	A	A	A	A	A	A	
Pontins Professional	NH	SF	SF	A	SF	RR	A	A	A	A	A	A	A	A	A	A	A	A	A	A	A	A	A	A	
Former ranking tournaments
Canadian Masters (Note: The event was also called the Canadian Open (1978/1979–1980/1981).)	Not held		Non-ranking event							Tournament not held				Non-ranking event			QF	Tournament not held							
Hong Kong Open	Tournament not held							Non-ranking event									NH	LQ	Tournament not held				NR		
Classic	Tournament not held							Non-ranking event				1R	F	F	2R	2R	SF	2R	1R	2R	Tournament not held				
Strachan Open	Tournament not held																			QF	MR	NR	Not held		
Former non-ranking tournaments
World Championship	2R	Ranking event																							
World Masters	Not held		W	Tournament not held																					
Norwich Union Open	NH	QF	SF	Tournament not held																					
World Matchplay Championship	Tournament not held				1R	Tournament not held																			
Holsten Lager International	Tournament not held						QF	Tournament not held																	
Limosin International	Tournament not held							SF	Tournament not held																
Bombay International	Tournament not held						RR	F	Tournament not held																
Pontins Camber Sands	Tournament not held							QF	Tournament not held																
Champion of Champions	Tournament not held						A	NH	RR	Tournament not held															
International Open	Tournament not held									2R	Ranking event								Not held		Ranking event				
Northern Ireland Classic	Tournament not held									QF	Tournament not held														
UK Championship	Tournament not held					A	A	A	A	2R	A	A	Ranking event												
British Open	Tournament not held							A	RR	2R	A	A	Ranking event												
Classic	Tournament not held							A	QF (Note: The quarter-finals were the first round.)	QF	QF	Ranking event									Tournament not held				
Tolly Cobbold Classic	Tournament not held						A	A	F	A	A	SF	Tournament not held												
New Zealand Masters	Tournament not held												QF	Not held			A	A	Tournament not held						
Carlsberg Challenge	Tournament not held												A	SF	A	A	A	Tournament not held							
KitKat Break for World Champions	Tournament not held													QF	Tournament not held										
Pot Black	A	RR	A	A	SF	RR	A	A	W	SF	A	A	SF	SF	Tournament not held						A	A	A	NH	
Hong Kong Masters	Tournament not held											A	A	A	QF	QF	A	NH	A	A	Tournament not held				
Canadian Masters	Not held		W	QF	QF	QF	W	W	W	Tournament not held				SF	QF	SF	R	Tournament not held							
Canadian Professional Championship	Tournament not held								W	Not held		SF	W	W	W	W	SF	Tournament not held							
Dubai Masters	Tournament not held																QF	Ranking event							
Matchroom Professional Championship	Tournament not held														A	A	QF	Ranking event							
Norwich Union Grand Prix	Tournament not held																RR	A	A	Tournament not held					
World Matchplay	Tournament not held																1R	1R	A	A	A	Not held			
Shoot-Out	Tournament not held																		3R	Tournament not held					
European Grand Masters	Tournament not held																		QF	Tournament not held					
World Masters	Tournament not held																		1R	Tournament not held					
European Challenge	Tournament not held																			QF	A	Not held			
World Seniors Championship	Tournament not held																			1R	Tournament not held				

Legend
LQ	lost in the qualifying draw	#R	lost in the early rounds of the tournament (WR = Wildcard round, RR = Round robin)	QF	lost in the quarter-finals
SF	lost in the semi-finals	F	lost in the final	W	won the tournament
DNQ	did not qualify for the tournament	A	did not participate in the tournament	WD	withdrew from the tournament

NH / Not held	means an event was not held.
NR / Non-ranking event	means an event is/was no longer a ranking event.
R / Ranking event	means an event is/was a ranking event.

== Career finals ==
=== Ranking finals: 10 (2 titles) ===
Thorburn's record in ranking tournament finals is shown below.

Legend
World Championship (1–2)
Other (1–6)

Outcome	No.	Year	Championship	Opponent in the final	Score
Runner-up	1.	1977	World Snooker Championship	John Spencer (ENG)	21–25
Winner	1.	1980	World Snooker Championship	Alex Higgins (NIR)	18–16
Runner-up	2.	1983	World Snooker Championship (2)	Steve Davis (ENG)	6–18
Runner-up	3.	1983	International Open	Steve Davis (ENG)	4–9
Runner-up	4.	1984	Grand Prix	Dennis Taylor (NIR)	2–10
Runner-up	5.	1985	The Classic	Willie Thorne (ENG)	8–13
Winner	2.	1985	Matchroom Trophy	Jimmy White (ENG)	12–10
Runner-up	6.	1986	The Classic (2)	Jimmy White (ENG)	12–13
Runner-up	7.	1986	International Open (2)	Neal Foulds (ENG)	9–12
Runner-up	8.	1987	International Open (3)	Steve Davis (ENG)	5–12

=== Non-ranking finals: 24 (18 titles) ===
World Professional Billiards and Snooker Association, the governing body for professional snooker, first published official world rankings for players on the main tour for the 1976–77 season. Thorburn's record in non-ranking tournament finals is shown below.

Legend
The Masters (3–1)
Other (15–5)

Outcome	No.	Year	Championship	Opponent in the final	Score	Ref.
Runner-up	1.	1972	Championship Plate	John Pulman (ENG)	13–16	(Note: Thorburn's entry for the 1972 World Snooker Championship arrived too late for him to be included in the main draw. He was placed in the plate competition.)
Runner-up	2.	1973	Championship Plate	John Pulman (ENG)	12–16	
Winner	1.	1974	World Masters	John Spencer (ENG)	160–67 (Note: Aggregate points score across two frames)	
Winner	2.	1974	Canadian Open	Dennis Taylor (NIR)	8–6	
Runner-up	3.	1978	The Masters	Alex Higgins (NIR)	5–7	
Winner	3.	1978	Canadian Open (2)	Tony Meo (ENG)	17–15	
Winner	4.	1979	Canadian Open (3)	Terry Griffiths (WAL)	17–16	
Runner-up	4.	1980	Bombay International	John Virgo (ENG)	7–13	
Winner	5.	1980	Canadian Professional Championship	Jim Wych (CAN)	9–6	
Winner	6.	1980	Canadian Open (4)	Terry Griffiths (WAL)	17–10	
Winner	7.	1981	Pot Black	Jim Wych (CAN)	2–0	
Runner-up	5.	1981	Tolly Cobbold Classic	Graham Miles (ENG)	1–5	
Winner	8.	1981	Classic Tournament	Kirk Stevens (CAN)	6–2	
Runner-up	6.	1981	Scottish Masters	Jimmy White (ENG)	4–9	
Winner	9.	1983	The Masters	Ray Reardon (WAL)	9–7	
Winner	10.	1983	Australian Masters	Bill Werbeniuk (CAN)	7–3	
Winner	11.	1984	Canadian Professional Championship (2)	Mario Morra (CAN)	9–2	
Winner	12.	1985	The Masters (2)	Doug Mountjoy (WAL)	9–6	
Winner	13.	1985	Canadian Professional Championship (3)	Bob Chaperon (CAN)	6–4	
Winner	14.	1985	Scottish Masters	Willie Thorne (ENG)	9–7	
Winner	15.	1986	The Masters (3)	Jimmy White (ENG)	9–5	
Winner	16.	1986	Canadian Professional Championship (4)	Jim Wych (CAN)	6–2	
Winner	17.	1986	Scottish Masters (2)	Alex Higgins (NIR)	9–8	
Winner	18.	1987	Canadian Professional Championship (5)	Jim Bear (CAN)	8–4	

=== Team finals: 9 (4 titles) ===
Outcome	No.	Year	Championship	Team/partner	Opponent(s) in the final	Score	Ref.
Winner	1.	1975	Ladbroke International	Rest of the World (Note: The "Rest of the World" team was Thorburn, Ray Reardon (Wales), Eddie Charlton (Australia), and Alex Higgins and Jackie Rea (both Northern Ireland).)	England (Note: The England team was Rex Williams, Fred Davis, Graham Miles, John Spencer and John Pulman.)	+113 (Note: Difference in cumulative points scored)	
Runner-up	1.	1980	World Challenge Cup	Canada (Note: The other players were Bill Werbeniuk and Kirk Stevens.)	Wales (Note: The Wales team was Ray Reardon, Terry Griffiths and Doug Mountjoy)	5–8	
Winner	2.	1981	World Mixed Doubles Championship	Natalie Stelmach (CAN)	John Virgo (ENG); Vera Selby (ENG)	269–239 (Note: Aggregate points across four frames)	
Winner	3.	1982	World Team Classic	Canada	England (Note: The England team was Steve Davis, Jimmy White and Tony Knowles.)	4–2	
Runner-up	2.	1984	World Doubles Championship (2)	Willie Thorne (ENG)	Alex Higgins (NIR); Jimmy White (ENG)	2–10	
Runner-up	3.	1986	World Cup (2)	Canada	Ireland "A" (Note: The Ireland "A" team was Dennis Taylor and Alex Higgins from Northern Ireland, and Eugene Hughes from the Republic of Ireland.)	7–9	
Runner-up	4.	1987	World Cup (3)	Canada	Ireland "A"	2–9	
Runner-up	5.	1987	World Doubles Championship (2)	Dennis Taylor (NIR)	Stephen Hendry (SCO); Mike Hallett (ENG)	8–12	
Winner	4.	1990	World Cup (2)	Canada (Note: The other team members were Bob Chaperon and Alain Robidoux.)	Northern Ireland (Note: The Northern Ireland team was Dennis Taylor, Alex Higgins and Tommy Murphy,)	9–5	

=== Amateur finals: 12 (7 titles) ===
Outcome	No.	Year	Championship	Opponent in the final	Score	Ref.
Winner	1.	1971	North American Amateur Championship	Kenny Shea (CAN)	36–15	
Winner	2.	1972	Canadian Amateur Championship			
Runner-up	1.	1973	North American Amateur Championship	Bill Werbeniuk (CAN)	22–26	
Winner	3.	1974	Canadian Amateur Championship (2)	Julien St Dennis (CAN)	13–11	
Winner	4.	1975	Canadian Amateur Championship (3)	Bill Werbeniuk (CAN)	11–1	
Runner-up	2.	1975	North American Amateur Championship (2)	Bill Werbeniuk (CAN)	9–11	
Winner	5.	1976	Canadian Amateur Championship (4)	Bill Werbeniuk (CAN)	9–2	
Runner-up	3.	1976	North American Amateur Championship (3)	Bill Werbeniuk (CAN)	10–11	
Winner	6.	1977	Canadian Amateur Championship (5)	Robert Paquette (CAN)	10–6	
Winner	7.	2001	Canadian Amateur Championship (6)	Tom Finstad (CAN)	4–3	
Runner-up	4.	2002	Canadian Amateur Championship	Kirk Stevens (CAN)	1–6	
Runner-up	5.	2003	Canadian Amateur Championship (2)	Alain Robidoux (CAN)	2–6	

=== Seniors finals: 2 (1 title) ===
Outcome	No.	Year	Championship	Opponent in the final	Score	Ref.
Runner-up	1.	2000	World Seniors Masters	Willie Thorne (ENG)	0–1 (Note: 8–84 points)	
Winner	1.	2018	The Seniors Masters	Jonathan Bagley (ENG)	2–1	
