= John Bear (snooker player) =

Canadian snooker player (1944–2007)

Personal information
- Born: 8 August 1944 Kinistino, Saskatchewan, Canada
- Died: 17 March 2007 (aged 62) Victoria, British Columbia, Canada

Sport
- Country: Canada
- Sport: Snooker
- Professional: 1979–1982, 1983–1986
- Highest ranking: 25 (1982–1983)
- Best ranking finish: Last 32 (x1)

John Norman Bear (8 August 1944 – 17 March 2007) was a Canadian professional snooker player.

== Career ==
Born in Kinistino, Saskatchewan in 1944, Bear spent much of his childhood in Flin Flon where he learned how to play pool as a child and became a hustler.

In 1979, he turned professional, entering his first tournament at the 1979 Canadian Open, where he beat Bernie Mikkelsen 5–3 before losing in the second round 7–9 to the young Englishman Joe Johnson. He beat Mikkelsen again in the Canadian Professional Championship of that year by 9 frames to 4, having at one stage led 7–0, but lost his semi-final match 3–9 to Cliff Thorburn. Bear's first attempt at the World Championship resulted in a 5–9 loss in the last 48 to fellow countryman Jim Wych.

The following season, Bear entered only the Canadian Open, defeating R. Tammett 9–4 before exiting at the last 16 stage, 4–9 to Terry Griffiths. He recorded a 118 break, the highest of his career and first of only two competitive centuries, in his win over Tammett.

The 1981–82 season was similar, but this time, Bear's only event was the 1982 World Championship. Fellow Canadians Cliff Thorburn, Bill Werbeniuk and Kirk Stevens were among the world's top players at this time, and Bear faced two matches in order to play alongside them at the Crucible Theatre. His first was a 9–4 defeat of Frank Jonik, and in the second, he was victorious by the same scoreline over Wych, securing himself a meeting with Werbeniuk in the last 32. Having held Werbeniuk to 2–4 and later recovered from 2–7 to 6–8, Bear eventually lost the match 7–10. Uniquely, each of his three matches in 1982 were between two Canadian players. He did not progress to the main stages of the World Championship again.

The only tournament Bear entered the following season was the 1983 World Championship; here, he was unable to repeat his feats of the previous year, losing at the first attempt 7–10 to Paul Medati.

In the 1983 Canadian Professional Championship, Bear was defeated 5–9 in the quarter-finals by his brother Jim; the final event he entered as a professional was the 1985 edition, where he beat Mario Morra 5–4 before losing 3–6 to Wych.

Well-respected in his local community and in the world of pool, Bear died on 17 March 2007 at Royal Jubilee Hospital, aged 62.

== Career finals ==
=== Amateur finals: 1 ===
Outcome	No.	Year	Championship	Opponent in the final	Score
Runner-up	1.	1988	Canadian Amateur Championship	(Canada) Brady Gollan	3–7
