= Bernie Mikkelsen =

Canadian snooker player (born 1950)

Personal information
- Born: 11 April 1950 (age 76) Hamilton, Ontario

Sport
- Country: Canada
- Sport: Snooker
- Professional: 1979–1989
- Highest ranking: 37

Bernie Mikkelsen (born 11 April 1950) is a Canadian former professional snooker player.

== Career ==
Mikkelsen recorded a 9–8 victory over John Pulman to reach the semi-finals of the 1976 Canadian Open where he lost 1–9 to Alex Higgins. At the 1976 World Amateur Snooker Championship, representing Canada, Mikkelsen recovered from 0-3 behind against Bert Demarco to win 4–3, but with only three wins in eight matches in the qualifying round-robin group, he did not progress to the later stages. In 1977 he became the first Canadian player to make a maximum break in competition.

Mikkelsen turned professional in 1979, and played only at the World Snooker Championship in his first three seasons. He lost in the first qualifying round each time; 7–9 to Roy Amdor in 1980, 4–9 to Jimmy White in 1981, and 6–9 to Colin Roscoe in 1982. After not competing during the 1982–83 snooker season, Mikkelsen reached the third qualifying round of the 1984 World Snooker Championship with wins over Paul Medati and Frank Jonik before being eliminated 3–10 by Willie Thorne. In a qualifying match for the 1985 World Snooker Championship, Mikkelsen compiled a break of 132, but lost 9–10 to Malcolm Bradley.

Reaching the last 48 of the 1984 World Championship was to be the furthest that Mikkelsen progressed in a major tournament as a professional. His highest snooker world ranking was 37. He lost his professional status after withdrawing from a play-off match against the then-amateur James Wattana in 1989.

In 1996, Mikkelsen won the Canadian Open Nine-ball pool championship by defeating Paul Potier 15–14 in the final.

== Career highlights ==
Sport	Outcome	Year	Championship	Opponent in the final	Score	Ref.
Nine-ball pool	Winner	1996	Canadian Open Nine-ball Championship	Paul Potier	15–14	
