= Frank Jonik =

Canadian snooker player (1957–2019)

Personal information
- Born: December 2, 1957
- Died: 31 March 2019 (aged 61) Greater Sudbury

Sport
- Country: Canada
- Sport: Snooker
- Professional: 1979–1990
- Highest ranking: 45 (1983/1984)
- Best ranking finish: Last 32 (x1)

Francis "Frank" Jonik (2 December 1957 – 31 March 2019) was a Canadian professional snooker player.

== Career ==
Born in 1957, Jonik first played competitive snooker in 1978 at the Canadian Professional Championship, and turned professional in 1979.

After several seasons on the tour, Jonik reached the last 32 at the 1982 Professional Players Tournament, defeating Welshman Doug Mountjoy 5–3 in his last-64 match before being whitewashed 5–0 by Tony Meo.

Starting the 1983/1984 season ranked 45th, Jonik reached the final of the non-ranking Canadian Professional Championship that year, beating Bob Chaperon, Jim Wych and Cliff Thorburn to set up an encounter with Kirk Stevens. Their match went to a deciding frame, in which Stevens prevailed to win the final, 9–8, and the tournament.

In the 1984/1985 season, Jonik defeated Jack McLaughlin 6–2 in the British Open, facing the veteran John Spencer in the last 64. Although Jonik came close to winning the third frame before a 61 break by Spencer, the three-time World Champion was consummate in beating him 6–0.

Jonik's form in the following several seasons was poor; in the 1987 Classic, he overcame Steve James 5–4 and Tony Drago 5–2 before exiting at the last-64 stage, 4–5 to Barry West.

During the 1988/1989 season, Jonik played only in that year's Canadian Professional Championship; entering at the quarter-final stage after his opponent Gino Rigitano's withdrawal, he played Thorburn in his first match, leading 4–2 but losing 4–6.

The match against Thorburn was Jonik's last at competitive level. He did not play at all the following season and was relegated from the tour, ranked 127th, at its conclusion in 1990.

== Career finals ==
=== Non-ranking finals: 1 ===
Outcome	Year	Championship	Opponent in the final	Score
Runner-up	1983	Canadian Professional Championship	(Canada) Kirk Stevens	8–9
