= Mario Morra (pool player) =

Canadian snooker and pool player (born 1953)

Personal information
- Born: 8 September 1953 (age 72) Hamilton, Ontario

Pool career
- Country: Canada
- Turned pro: 1979
- Pool games: Snooker, eight-ball, nine-ball, ten-ball
- Current rank: Not WPA ranked
- Highest rank: Not WPA ranked

Mario Morra (born 8 September 1953) is a Canadian professional pool player and former professional snooker player. He reached the tournament finals of the 1984 Canadian Professional Championship, the 2008 Canadian Nine-ball championship, and the 2010 Canadian Ten-ball championship.

== Career ==
Morra became a snooker professional in 1979 and had limited success although he defeated both Mike Hallett and Jimmy White in the 1983 Jameson International Open, and, by winning three qualifying matches, reached the last 32 of the 1984 World Snooker Championship, where he lost 10–3 to Cliff Thorburn. He narrowly missed joining last 32 for the 1985 World Snooker Championship, losing 10–9 to John Campbell.

He was runner-up to Cliff Thorburn in the 1984 Canadian Professional Championship.

His highest ranking was 35, in the Snooker world rankings 1984/1985.

More recently, Morra is known as a pool player, and was runner up in both the 2008 Canadian Nine-ball Championship and the 2010 Canadian Ten-ball Championship.

He has a son, John Morra, with professional pool and snooker player Anita McMahon. McMahon has won 15 Canadian pool titles, and won the Canadian Women's Snooker title three times, from 2004 to 2006. John Morra is a top ranked professional pool player. Alex Pagulayan won the 2012 Canadian Eight-ball Championship after defeating Mario Morra in the semi-final, and John Morra in the final. Pagulayan also beat Mario Morra in the early rounds of the 2016 Canadian Nine-ball Championship before defeating John Morra in the final.

== Achievements ==
Snooker

- 1984 Canadian Professional Championship runner-up
- 1987 Canadian Professional Championship semi-finalist

Pool

- Molson Cup 2003, 3rd place
- Canadian ST 2004 Stop, 3rd place
- Canadian 30K Tour 2006 #14 runner-up
- Canadian Nine-ball Tour 2007 #5, 3rd place
- Canadian Nine-ball Tour 2007 #4, 3rd place
- Canadian Nine-ball Tour 2008 #5, 3rd place
- 2008 Canadian Open Nine-ball Championship runner-up
- 2010 Canadian Open Ten-ball Championship runner-up
- 2014 Canadian Open Ten-ball Championship – 3rd place
- 2015 Canadian Open Nine-ball Championship – 3rd place
- 2018 Canadian Open Ten-ball Championship – 4th place
