= Jim Wych =

Canadian sports commentator and snooker player (born 1955)

Personal information
- Born: 11 January 1955 (age 71) Calgary, Alberta

Sport
- Country: Canada
- Sport: Snooker
- Professional: 1979–1997
- Highest ranking: 17 (1980–1982)
- Best ranking finish: Quarter-final (x4)

Jim Wych (Note: Pronounced /ˈwaɪtʃ/ WYCHE) (born 11 January 1955) is a Canadian sports commentator, tv presenter and former professional snooker and pocket billiards player. He turned professional in 1979 and reached the quarter-final of the 1980 World Snooker Championship in his debut year, and reached the world championship quarter-final stage again in 1992. Wych also reached the quarter-finals of two other ranking tournaments, the 1986 British Open and the 1989 European Open. He reached the final of the men's doubles at the 1991 World Masters, playing with Brady Gollan.

A two-time Canadian amateur champion, in 1979 and 1999, Wych retired from professional snooker in 1997 and now works mainly as a television pool and snooker commentator, including for Sky Sports, where he started working in the early 1990s.

Wych was ranked in the top 64 players each year for 15 consecutive seasons, from 1980/1981 to 1994/1995. His highest career ranking was 17, in the snooker world ranking lists for 1980/1981 and 1981/1982.

== Career finals ==
=== Non-ranking finals: 4 ===
Outcome	No.	Year	Championship	Opponent in the final	Score
Runner-up	1.	1980	Canadian Professional Championship	(Canada) Cliff Thorburn	6–9
Runner-up	2.	1981	Pot Black	(Canada) Cliff Thorburn	0-2
Runner-up	3.	1986	Canadian Professional Championship (2)	(Canada) Cliff Thorburn	2–6
Runner-up	4.	1988	Canadian Professional Championship (3)	(Canada) Alain Robidoux	4–8

=== Team finals: 1 ===
Outcome	No.	Year	Championship	Team/partner	Opponent(s) in the final	Score
Runner-up	1.	1991	World Masters	(Canada) Brady Gollan	(England) Mike Hallett (Scotland) Stephen Hendry	5–8

=== Amateur finals: 2 (2 titles) ===
Outcome	No.	Year	Championship	Opponent in the final	Score
Winner	1.	1979	Canadian Amateur Championship	(Canada) Bob Paquette	10–7
Winner	2.	1999	Canadian Amateur Championship (2)	(Canada) Tom Finstad	6–4
