= 1979–80 snooker world rankings =

The World Professional Billiards and Snooker Association (WPBSA), the governing body for professional snooker, first published official world rankings for players on the main tour for the 1976–77 season. Before this, for each tournament the defending champion was seeded first, and the previous year's runner-up second.

For the 1979/1980 ranking list, players' performances in the previous three World Snooker Championships (1977, 1978 and 1979) contributed to their points total. For each of the three years, the World Champion gained five points, the runner-up received four, losing semi-finalists got three, losing quarter-finalists got two, and losers in the last-16 round received a single point. Ray Reardon retained top place in the rankings from the 1978/1979 listing, with 12 points.

The day following the 1979 World Championship, on 29 April, the WPBSA voted that only two players would receive direct entry into the last 16 of the 1980 World Championship: the 1979 champion Terry Griffiths and runner-up Dennis Taylor. (Note: According to John Virgo, this was proposed by Derek Mienie and seconded by Taylor before being agreed by a vote of the professional players at a well-attended meeting.) This resolution was poorly received by the BBC, who televised the championship, and by tournament sponsors Embassy; both organisations were concerned that star players could be eliminated before the televised stage. The Professional Snooker Association (PSA), formed soon after the meeting, challenged the decision. The PSA included many leading players, and had Reardon, John Spencer and snooker agent Del Simmonds as directors. According to Griffiths, both he and Taylor joined the PSA in "solidarity". Within weeks, the next meeting of the WPBSA voted to revert to the previous system, where the top eight players in the rankings were exempted to the last 16 of the world championship, and the players ranked nine to 16 would each be exempted to the first round (last 24) where they would each face a player from the qualifying competition. At the meeting which backed reverting to the previous system for the world championship, the WPBSA also determined that the world champion would be the top seed for the UK Championship, with the defending UK champion as second seed. A subsequent WPBSA decision to seed all players for the 1979 UK Championship except the world champion based on the results from the 1977 and 1978 UK championships was reversed at the request of the tournament sponsors, Coral.

== Rankings ==
The professional world rankings for the snooker players in the 1979–80 season are listed below. Points gained in each of the three World Snooker Championships are shown, with the total number of points given in the last column. A "–" symbol indicates that the player did not participate in that year's championship. (Note: It is unclear why seven players with 0 points were included in the rankings.)

Snooker world rankings 1979/1980
Ranking	Name	1977	1978	1979	Total
1	Ray Reardon (WAL)	2	5	2	9
2	Dennis Taylor (NIR)	3	1	4	8
3	Eddie Charlton (AUS)	2	3	3	8
4	John Spencer (ENG)	5	1	1	7
5	Cliff Thorburn (CAN)	4	2	1	7
6	Fred Davis (ENG)	1	3	2	6
7	Perrie Mans (RSA)	1	4	1	6
8	Terry Griffiths (WAL)	–	–	5	5
9	Graham Miles (ENG)	2	2	1	5
10	John Virgo (ENG)	1	0	3	4
11	Alex Higgins (NIR)	1	1	2	4
12	Bill Werbeniuk (CAN)	–	2	2	4
13	Doug Mountjoy (WAL)	2	1	1	4
14	John Pulman (ENG)	3	1	0	4
15	David Taylor (ENG)	1	1	1	3
16	Patsy Fagan (IRL)	1	2	0	3
17	Willie Thorne (ENG)	1	1	0	2
18	Steve Davis (ENG)	–	–	1	1
19	Kirk Stevens (CAN)	–	–	1	1
20	Pat Houlihan (ENG)	–	1	0	1
21	Rex Williams (ENG)	1	0	0	1
22	Jim Meadowcroft (ENG)	0	0	0	0
23	John Dunning (ENG)	0	0	0	0
24	Warren Simpson (AUS)	–	–	–	0
25	Ian Anderson (AUS)	–	–	0	0
26	Marcus Owen (WAL)	–	–	–	0
27	Bernard Bennett (ENG)	0	0	0	0
28	Paddy Morgan (AUS)	–	0	–	0

Preceded by 1978/1979	1979/1980	Succeeded by 1980/1981
