= 1978 Masters (snooker) =

Professional non-ranking snooker tournament, Feb 1978

1978 Benson & Hedges Masters
Tournament information
- Dates: 6–10 February 1978
- Venue: New London Theatre
- City: London
- Country: England
- Format: Non-ranking event
- Total prize fund: £8,000
- Winner's share: £3,000
- Highest break: Cliff Thorburn (CAN) (88)

Final
- Champion: Alex Higgins (NIR)
- Runner-up: Cliff Thorburn (CAN)
- Score: 7–5

The 1978 Masters (officially the 1978 Benson & Hedges Masters) was a professional non-ranking snooker tournament that took place from 6 to 10 February 1978 at the New London Theatre in London, England. It was organised by representatives of the sponsors, cigarette brand Benson & Hedges, and sanctioned by the World Professional Billiards and Snooker Association. Ten players were invited to participate, including debutant Patsy Fagan.

Doug Mountjoy was the defending champion, having defeated Ray Reardon 7–6 in the 1977 final. Mountjoy failed to retain his title, losing 2–4 to Cliff Thorburn in the quarter-finals.

Alex Higgins won the title by defeating Thorburn 7–5 in the final, having led 3–0 before Thorburn fought back to level the match at 3–3 and later 5–5. Higgins ultimately won three of the last four frames to take the match. It was his first Masters title and his first win in a major tournament since the 1972 World Snooker Championship. Thorburn made the highest break of the tournament, 88, in the fourth frame of the final.

The tournament carried a total prize fund of £8,000, with £3,000 going to the winner. Highlights were broadcast on BBC1's Grandstand, with commentary by Ted Lowe.

== Overview ==
The 1978 Masters was staged at the New London Theatre in Drury Lane, London, with ten invited players and was the fourth edition of the Masters after its establishment in 1975. It was organised by representatives of the sponsors, cigarette brand Benson & Hedges, and sanctioned by the World Professional Billiards and Snooker Association. Snooker Scene magazine wrote that the Masters was "snooker's second most important title" after the World Snooker Championship.

Doug Mountjoy was the defending champion, having defeated Ray Reardon 7–6 in the 1977 final. The invited players included debutant Patsy Fagan.

Highlights of the 1978 Masters were broadcast as part of Grandstand on BBC1, with commentary by Ted Lowe. A pro-celebrity match featuring John Spencer and Eric Sykes against Ray Reardon and Peter Alliss was advertised as happening as part of the event, on the day of the final.

=== Prize fund ===
The winner of the event received £3,000 from a total prize fund of £8,000. The breakdown of prize money is shown below:

- Winner: £3,000
- Runner-up: £1,500
- Semi-finals: £750
- Quarter-finals: £400
- First round: £250
- Total: £8,000

== Summary ==
=== First round ===
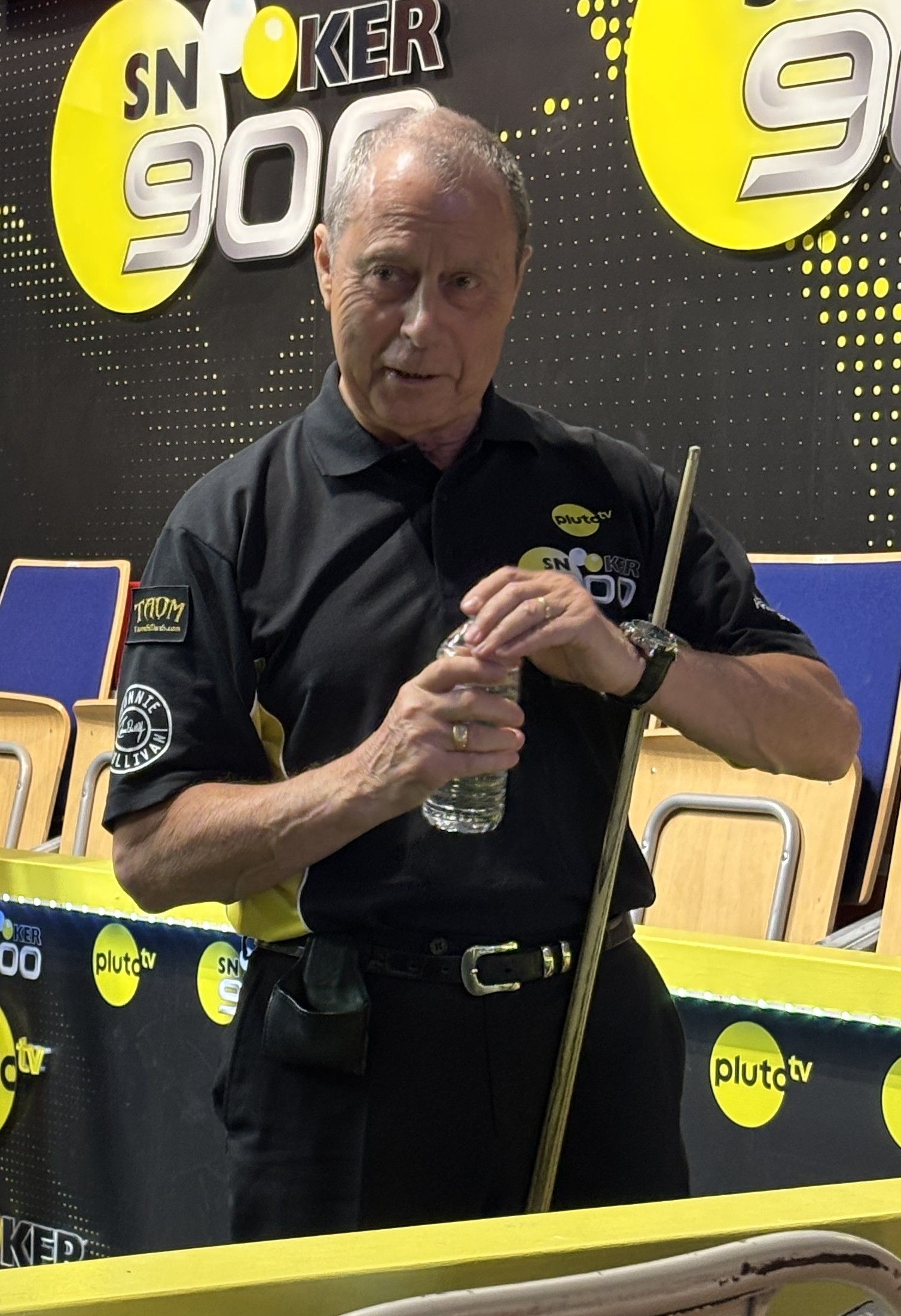
Patsy Fagan (pictured in 2026) made his debut at the Masters.

First round matches were played on 6 and 7 February as the best-of-seven frames. Patsy Fagan came into the tournament having earnt £2,000 winner's prizes at both the UK Championship and the Dry Blackthorn Cup in December. He took the first frame against John Pulman, but according to the correspondent for The Daily Telegraph, Fagan then "became increasingly hesitant as the match progressed." Pulman took a 3–1 lead, then Fagan won frame five. The sixth frame was decided on the final black ball. Pulman missed five attempts to pot the black; Fagan conceded when he left the black over a pocket, meaning Pulman won 4–2.

Fred Davis won a lengthy first frame against Graham Miles with a break of 47, and he added the second with a break of 68. Miles won the third frame; Clive Everton wrote in The Guardian that apart from the larger breaks, "the exchanges were tortuously slow, and a gently soporific air descended on the arena". Davis established a 3–1 lead by winning the fourth frame on the final black. In the fifth frame, Davis was 34 points behind, but took the lead with a break of 42. Miles, however, went on to win the frame on the black, then added the sixth frame to force a decider, which he won.

=== Quarter-finals ===
The quarter-finals were played from 6 to 8 February as the best-of-seven frames. Defending champion Doug Mountjoy lost 2–4 to Cliff Thorburn despite making the two highest breaks of the match, 55 and 52. Trailing 1–28 in the first frame, Mountjoy took the lead, but an attempted safety shot sent the cue ball into a baulk pocket, leaving Thorburn to clear the table and win the frame. Thorburn went on to lead 3–1, made a break of 55 in the sixth frame to win 4–2.

The match between Pulman and John Spencer was "marred by numerous mistakes" according to the report in The Daily Telegraph. Pulman was making his first tournament appearance of the season, having been kept out of the UK Championship at Blackpool by an eye injury. He won the first frame, but the same report commented that the standard of Pulman's play then declined and "Spencer, also below his best" ran out a 4–2 winner.

Alex Higgins defeated Dennis Taylor 4–3, a week after defeating him 21–7 for the Irish Professional Championship title.

Ray Reardon compiled a break of 40 in the first frame against Miles, and breaks of 28 and 27 helped him to a 56–1 lead in the second; although Miles replied with a break of 30, his failure to pot the yellow ball allowed Reardon to conclude the frame. Miles made the highest break of the tournament to that point, 64, to win the third frame. Reardon won the match 4–1 with a break of 37 in the fifth frame that left Miles needing snookers.

=== Semi-finals ===
The semi-finals were held on 9 February as the best-of-nine frames across two sessions. Spencer played Thorburn in a rematch of the 1977 World Snooker Championship final won by Spencer. Spencer built a 3–1 lead, which included a break of 80 in the second frame, and Everton wrote that Spencer "appeared a different player altogether from that suggested by his scrappy [win against Pulman]". Thorburn won four consecutive frames from the start of the second session to win 5–3.

Higgins won the first two frames against Reardon within twenty minutes, making an 87 break in the second frame and after 61 minutes he was 4–0 ahead. He wrote in 1981 that, "It would have been a lot faster but Ray takes a while to chalk his cue. He tried to slow the tempo down with a lot of sly safety in the fourth frame, but I was on song and the balls were running for me." He won the match 5–1.

=== Final ===
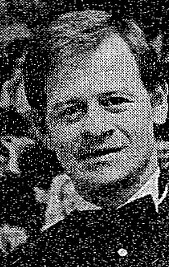
Alex Higgins (pictured in 1988) won his first Masters title.

The final between Higgins and Thorburn was played on 10 February as the best-of-13 frames across two sessions. The referee was John Street.

Higgins won the first three frames comfortably, 107–17, 71–41 and 94–6, racing round the table and chain-smoking as he played. Thorburn, who had been below his best after a tiring semi-final win over John Spencer the previous day, appeared to find his form after the mid-session interval, while Higgins seemed to lose his early impetus. Thorburn won the next two frames, 69–17 and 104–16, and then completed an 88 clearance – the highest break of the tournament – to level the match at 3–3.

Thorburn continued his recovery into the evening session, taking the seventh frame 62–14 as Higgins conceded with two reds still remaining. Higgins responded with an 80 break, playing black after each of his first seven reds in an attempt at a maximum, to level at 4–4. Thorburn edged back in front, winning the ninth frame with a 29 clearance on the black after a fortunate snooker and a free ball. He then led 40–5 in the tenth before Higgins compiled a 41 break to close to within 20 points with only the pink and black remaining; after Higgins missed the pink, Thorburn asked him to play again from an awkward position, and Higgins's response – a fast doubled pink from baulk to a top pocket – won him the frame and levelled the match at 5–5.

Thorburn led 47–20 in the eleventh frame but Higgins, helped by a couple of snookers and a long pink, won the frame 61–47 to go 6–5 ahead. This proved decisive, and Higgins completed victory in the twelfth frame with a break of 44, winning 52–8 to take the match 7–5. It was Higgins's first victory in the Masters, and represented his first major tournament win since the 1972 World Snooker Championship. One of Higgins's biographers, John Hennessey, commented that for Higgins not to have won another significant title for so long was "a fact barely believable considering his towering talent."

Former world champion John Pulman praised Higgins afterwards, remarking that when things go Higgins's way, "he is unbelievable". Higgins later wrote, "I won't say I was unstoppable. You could have stopped me with an elephant gun. But I meant to win."

== Main draw ==
The draw for the tournament is shown below. The match winners are shown in bold.

**First round** Best of 7 frames
**John Pulman (ENG)**	**4**
Patsy Fagan (IRL)	2
Fred Davis (ENG)	3
**Graham Miles (ENG)**	**4**

**Quarter-finals**; Best of 7 frames
Doug Mountjoy (WAL)	2
**Cliff Thorburn (CAN)**	**4**
**John Spencer (ENG)**	**4**
John Pulman (ENG)	2
**Alex Higgins (NIR)**	**4**
Dennis Taylor (NIR)	3
**Ray Reardon (WAL)**	**4**
Graham Miles (ENG)	1

**Semi-finals**; Best of 9 frames
**Cliff Thorburn (CAN)**	**5**
John Spencer (ENG)	3
**Alex Higgins (NIR)**	**5**
Ray Reardon (WAL)	1

**Final**; Best of 13 frames
Cliff Thorburn (CAN)	5
**Alex Higgins (NIR)**	**7**

== Final: details and frame scores ==
Final
Best of 13 frames. Referee: John Street; New London Theatre, London, England, 10 February 1978. Numbers in parentheses are breaks of 50 or more.
**Alex Higgins (NIR)**	**7**–5	Cliff Thorburn (CAN)
First session: **107**–7, **71**–41, **94**–6, 17–**69**, 16–**104**, 13–**101** (88); Second session: 14–**62**, **84**–29 (80), 58–**70**, **68**–48, **61**–47, **72**–15
80	Highest break	**88**
1	50+ breaks	1
