= 1980–81 snooker world rankings =

The World Professional Billiards and Snooker Association (WPBSA), the governing body for professional snooker, first published official world rankings for players on the main tour for the 1976–77 season. Before this, for each tournament the defending champion was seeded first, and the previous year's runner-up second.

Players' performances in the previous three World Snooker Championships (1978, 1979 and 1980) contributed to their points total. For each of the three years, the World Champion gained five points, the runner-up received four, losing semi-finalists got three, losing quarter-finalists got two, and losers in the last-16 round received a single point. Ray Reardon, who had not won a major title for two years, retained the number one ranking that he had held since the inception of the rankings, despite only reaching the quarter-finals of the 1979 and 1980 championships. The 1980 World Champion, Cliff Thorburn, was ranked second, and Eddie Charlton was placed third, as he had been for each year since the 1976/1977 list. John Spencer, the 1977 champion, dropped from fourth place to 15th. Player and commentator Jack Karnehm remarked that in the 1976/1977 rankings Reardon was ten points ahead of the player ranked tenth, but in the 1980/1981 list there were only four points between the first and tenth-ranked places, which Karnehm considered showed a greater parity between the top players.

The eight highest-ranked players were placed directly into the last-16 round of the 1981 World Snooker Championship, with defending champion Thorburn as the top seed. The next eight from the list were placed into the first round and would face a player from the qualifying competition. Karnehm criticised the ranking system for not taking into consideration players' performances at tournaments other than the world championship and, because the points were accumulated over three years, having a bias against new players. The article in Snooker Scene magazine discussing the ranking list for 1980/1981 also contained concerns about the advantage to established players, whilst arguing that no better alternative system had been proposed.

== Rankings ==
The professional world rankings for snooker players in the 1980–81 season are listed below. Points gained in each of the three World Snooker Championships are shown, with the total number of points given in the last column. A "–" symbol indicates that the player did not participate in that year's championship. (Note: It is unclear why six players with 0 points were included in the rankings.)

Snooker world rankings 1980/1981
Ranking	Name	1978	1979	1980	Total
1	Ray Reardon (WAL)	5	2	2	9
2	Cliff Thorburn (CAN)	2	1	5	8
3	Eddie Charlton (AUS)	3	3	2	8
4	Alex Higgins (NIR)	1	2	4	7
5	Terry Griffiths (WAL)	–	5	1	6
6	Dennis Taylor (NIR)	1	4	1	6
7	Perrie Mans (RSA)	4	1	1	6
8	Fred Davis (ENG)	3	2	1	6
9	David Taylor (ENG)	1	1	3	5
10	Bill Werbeniuk (CAN)	2	2	1	5
11	Kirk Stevens (CAN)	–	1	3	4
12	John Virgo (ENG)	0	3	1	4
13	Steve Davis (ENG)	–	1	2	3
14	Doug Mountjoy (WAL)	1	1	1	3
15	John Spencer (ENG)	1	1	1	3
16	Graham Miles (ENG)	2	1	0	3
17	Jim Wych (CAN)	–	–	2	2
18	Patsy Fagan (IRL)	2	0	0	2
19	John Pulman (ENG)	1	0	0	1
20	Willie Thorne (ENG)	1	0	0	1
21	Pat Houlihan (ENG)	1	0	0	1
22	Rex Williams (ENG)	0	0	0	0
23	Jim Meadowcroft (ENG)	0	0	0	0
24	John Dunning (ENG)	0	0	0	0
25	Ian Anderson (AUS)	–	0	0	0
26	Bernard Bennett (ENG)	0	0	0	0
27	Paddy Morgan (AUS)	0	–	0	0

Preceded by 1979/1980	1980/1981	Succeeded by 1981/1982
