= 1980 World Snooker Championship =

Professional snooker tournament

1980 Embassy World Snooker Championship
Tournament information
- Dates: 22 April – 5 May 1980
- Venue: Crucible Theatre
- City: Sheffield
- Country: England
- Organisation: WPBSA
- Format: Ranking event
- Total prize fund: £60,000
- Winner's share: £15,000
- Highest break: Kirk Stevens (CAN) (136); Steve Davis (ENG) (136)

Final
- Champion: Cliff Thorburn (CAN)
- Runner-up: Alex Higgins (NIR)
- Score: 18–16

The 1980 World Snooker Championship, officially known as the 1980 Embassy World Snooker Championship for sponsorship reasons, was a ranking professional snooker tournament that took place from 22 April to 5 May 1980 at the Crucible Theatre in Sheffield, England. The tournament was the 1980 edition of the World Snooker Championship and was the fourth consecutive world championship to take place at the Crucible Theatre since 1977. It was authorised by the World Professional Billiards and Snooker Association. The total prize fund for the tournament was £60,000, of which £15,000 went to the winner.

There were 53 entrants to the competition, although four later withdrew. Qualifying rounds for the tournament took place at Romiley Forum, Stockport, from 5 to 18 April 1980; at the Redwood Lodge Country Club, Bristol, from 11 to 16 April; and at Sheffield Snooker Centre from 12 to 17 April. The main stage of the tournament featured 24 players: the top 16 players from the snooker world rankings and another eight players from the qualifying rounds. Ray Edmonds, Jim Meadowcroft, Tony Meo, Cliff Wilson and Jim Wych made their Crucible debuts. The defending champion and top seed in the tournament was Terry Griffiths, who had defeated Dennis Taylor 24–16 in the 1979 final.

Griffiths lost in his first match, by 10 frames to 13 against Steve Davis. Canadian Cliff Thorburn met the 1972 champion Alex Higgins from Northern Ireland in the final, which was a best-of-35-frames match. Thorburn won the match 18–16 to become the first world champion from outside the United Kingdom in the sport's modern era. There were 11 century breaks compiled during the championship, the highest of which was 136, achieved by both Kirk Stevens and Steve Davis. The cigarette manufacturer Embassy sponsored the tournament. It received 70 hours of television coverage by the BBC in the United Kingdom, attracting 14.5 million viewers for the conclusion of the final. Coverage of the final was interrupted by the broadcast of live coverage of the Iranian Embassy Siege, which caused numerous viewers to complain to the broadcaster.

== Overview ==
The World Snooker Championship is the preeminent tournament in professional snooker. Joe Davis won the first World Championship in 1927, organised by the Billiards Association and Control Council, the final match being held at Camkin's Hall in Birmingham, England. Staged annually until 1940, the tournament was put on hiatus during World War II and went into decline in the post-war era; the 1952 World Snooker Championship was contested by only two players and was replaced by the World Professional Match-play Championship, which was also discontinued in 1957. The title was contested on an occasional challenge basis until 1969, when the World Championship reverted to a knockout tournament format. Staged annually since then, the tournament moved in 1977 to the Crucible Theatre in Sheffield, England, which remains the venue for the tournament as of 2023. The 1980 event, organised by the World Professional Billiards and Snooker Association (WPBSA), was the fourth edition of the World Championship to be staged at the Crucible.

The 1980 championship featured 24 professional players competing in one-on-one snooker matches in a single-elimination format, each match played over several frames. The number of participants who played at the Crucible was increased from 16 in 1979. The competitors in the main tournament were selected using a combination of the top players in the world rankings, which were based on performances at the three preceding editions of the world championship, and the winners of a pre-tournament qualification stage. In all, 53 players entered the championship, but four later withdrew. The top eight seeded players were placed in round two of the draw. The next eight seeds were placed in round one, each to meet a player that emerged from the qualifying competition. At the start of the main event, defending champion Terry Griffiths and six-time champion Ray Reardon were joint bookmakers' favourites, both priced at 3–1, with Alex Higgins the third-favourite priced at 7–1.

The duration of the event, which had been 13 days in each of the three previous years, was increased to 14 days, with the semi-finals being reduced to best-of-31 frames (from best-of-37 in 1979) and the final to the best-of-35 frames (from best-of-47 in 1979). There had been a third place playoff in 1978 and 1979, but this was not continued in 1980. The competition was promoted by Mike Watterson and received 70 hours of television coverage by the BBC in the United Kingdom, attracting 14.5 million viewers for the conclusion of the final. The tournament was a ranking event and was sponsored by cigarette company Embassy.

=== Prize fund ===
The breakdown of prize money for this year is shown below:

- Winner: £15,000
- Runner-up: £8,000
- Semi-final: £4,000
- Quarter-final: £2,000
- Last 16: £1,500
- Last 24: £750
- Highest break: £1,000
- Championship record break (143 or above): £5,000 (not awarded)
- Maximum break: £10,000 (not awarded)
- Total: £60,000

== Tournament summary ==
=== Qualifying ===
Qualifying matches took place across three venues: at Romiley Forum, Stockport, from 5 April to 18 April 1980; at the Redwood Lodge Country Club, Bristol, from 11 April to 16 April; and at Sheffield Snooker Centre from 12 April to 17 April 1980. The qualifying rounds produced eight players who progressed to the main event, where they met the 16 invited seeded players.

The 1957 runner-up Jackie Rea defeated Bernard Bennett 9–1 before being eliminated 1–9 by Willie Thorne. Thorne was on course to make a maximum break in the first frame but missed a black ball after potting eleven reds and ten blacks. Steve Davis qualified after defeating Chris Ross 9–3 and Paddy Morgan 9–0. Kingsley Kennerley, in his first competitive match since 1974, lost 2–9 to Mike Hallett. Pat Houlihan, playing without his contact lenses due to conjunctivitis, compiled the only century break of the qualifying rounds—108—during a 9–6 victory over Joe Johnson; however he lost 1–9 in his following match to Tony Meo. Jim Wych progressed to the main event with a 9–7 win against Rex Williams, the world champion of English billiards.

=== First round ===
The first round took place between 22 and 25 April, each match played over either two or three scheduled sessions as the best of 19 frames. Meo, Wych, Cliff Wilson, Ray Edmonds, and Jim Meadowcroft made their Crucible debuts. Steve Davis led Patsy Fagan 6–3 after their first session and won 10–6. Fagan had led 2–0 but, from 5–6, lost four of the following five frames. Meo was 5–4 ahead of Higgins after their first session and, at 9–8, was a frame away from winning before Higgins took the last two frames with breaks of 77 and 62 to progress. Kirk Stevens compiled a break of 136 in the third frame against Graham Miles, missing the final black that would have made it an all-time championship record 143. After leading Miles 6–0 then 9–3 after the first two sessions, Stevens won 10–3. John Virgo won all six frames of his first session against Meadowcroft, with Meadowcroft winning two of the first three frames in the second session before being eliminated 2–10.

Wilson, the reigning World Amateur Snooker Champion, won the first frame against Doug Mountjoy on the black as part of a 66 clearance and took a 4–1 lead before finishing the first session at 5–4. Wilson then lost six of the last seven frames, resulting in a 6–10 loss. Mountjoy recorded a break of 104 in the fourteenth frame. Wych won 10–5 against former champion John Pulman after leading 5–4. This was Pulman's final appearance at the World Championship. Edmonds had replaced his cue tip the night before the match; playing with the unfamiliar tip, he lost the first four frames, then went 2–7 behind David Taylor before losing 3–10. Thorne, having led 3–1, took a 5–4 lead over Bill Werbeniuk with a 97 break in the ninth frame. He led in the match until Werbeniuk, who compiled a break of 101 in the thirteenth frame, made it 7–7. The contest went to a deciding frame which Werbeniuk won 84–8 with breaks of 39 and 36.

=== Second round ===
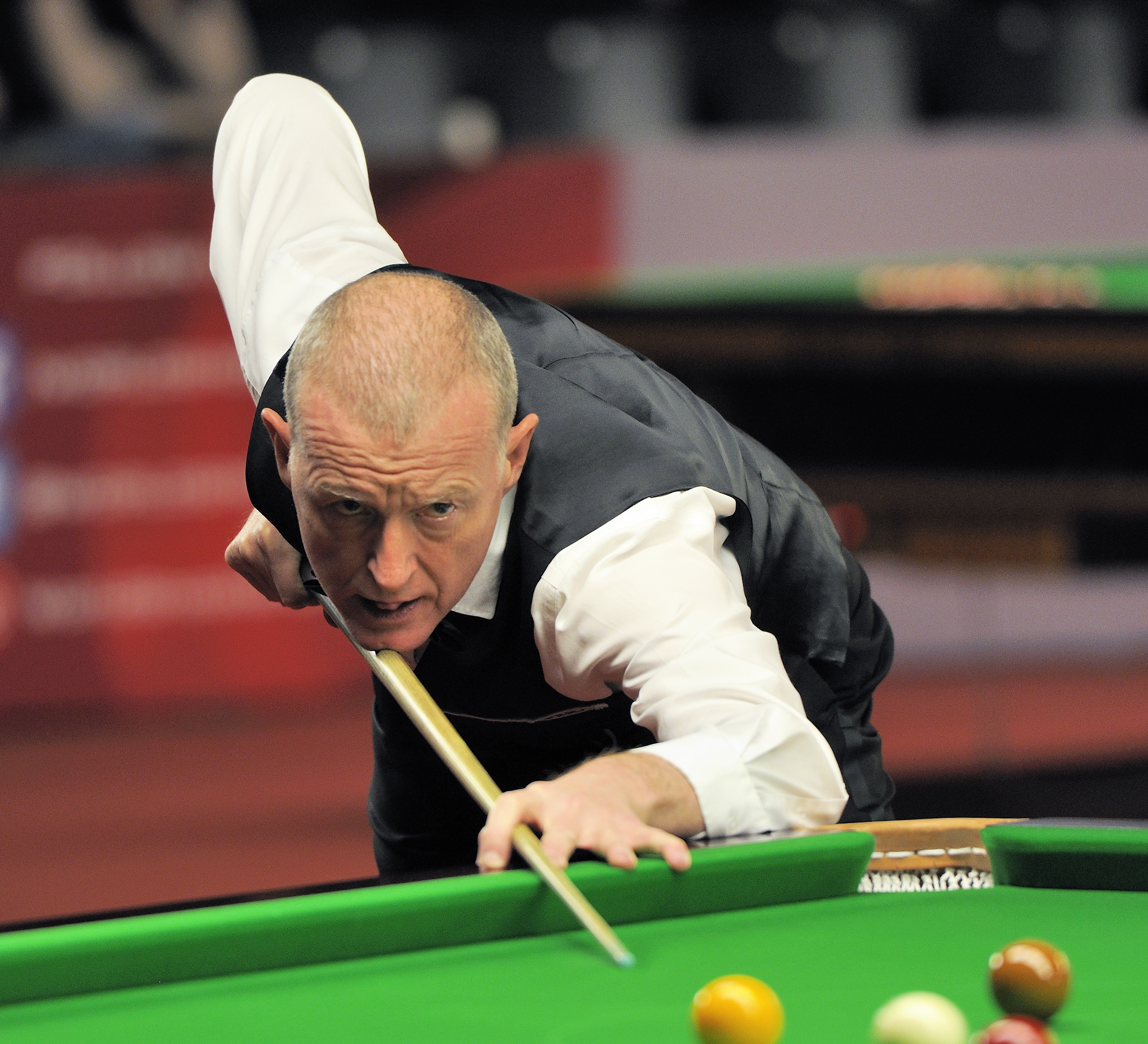
Steve Davis (pictured in 2014) eliminated defending champion Terry Griffiths.

The second round, which took place between 24 and 29 April, was played as best-of-25-frames matches spread over three sessions. Defending champion Griffiths lost the first seven frames against Steve Davis and ended the first session trailing 1–7. Davis won the opening frame of the second session to extend his lead to 8–1, and had a seven frame lead again at 10–3, before Griffiths won three frames to end the session 6–10 behind. In the third session, Griffiths won the first four frames to level at 10–10, with Davis then winning the next three to secure a 13–10 victory, which included a 116 break in the 22nd frame. The failure of first-time world snooker champions to defend their title has become known as the "Crucible curse".

Higgins won six of the eight frames in each of the first two sessions against Perrie Mans and eliminated Mans 13–6. Despite leading 4–1 after making breaks of 95 and 108 in consecutive frames, former champion John Spencer lost in his first match for the third consecutive year, 8–13 to Stevens. Virgo took an early lead of 4–1 against Eddie Charlton, with their first session finishing 4–4. At 11–10 ahead, Virgo missed a pot on the brown ball, and Charlton then levelled the match 11–11. The match went to a deciding frame, where Charlton made a break of 33, and Virgo missed a black that allowed Charlton back in to win 13–12. The report in Snooker Scene characterised the match as one where the "famed tenacity" of Charlton overcame the "brittle, edgy side of Virgo's temperament".

Cliff Thorburn finished the first session against Mountjoy 3–5 behind. In the evening, Thorburn played cards and drank alcohol with friends until 5:00 am, resuming the match by winning the first five frames in succession and going on to win 13–10. From 10–10 Thorburn won two frames on the pink ball and one on the black. The match featured a 69-minute 18th frame, including 21 minutes for the brown ball to be potted, and a 123 break in the 19th frame by Mountjoy. The previous year's runner-up Dennis Taylor was eliminated by Wych, who won the first three frames, and, after Taylor had equalised, took the seventh frame on a respotted black. The pair were level again at 8–8 before Wych won 13–10. Ray Reardon had session-end leads of 5–3 and 11–5 against Werbeniuk, and won 13–6. Fred Davis compiled a 106 break, the highest of the match, but lost 5–13 to David Taylor.

=== Quarter-finals ===
The quarter-finals were played as best-of-25-frames matches over three sessions on 29 and 30 April. Davis compiled a 136 break in the third frame against Higgins. In the eighth frame, Higgins was on course to achieve a maximum break, when he became the first player in the history of the world championship to pot black balls after each of the fifteen red balls during a break. After running out of position on the fifteenth black, he managed to pot the yellow ball, but failed in an attempt to then double the green ball. The pair finished their first session tied at 4–4. In the second session, the players were level at 7–7 before Higgins won the next two frames to carry a 9–7 lead into the last session, in which he won the match 13–9. It was the first time that Higgins had reached the semi-finals since 1976.

Having lost the first two frames to Wych, Thorburn built a 5–3 lead at the end of their first session and, after having led 9–3 and 10–6, progressed 13–6. With Stevens's "all-out attacking" play featuring "brilliant" potting, according to snooker historian Clive Everton, he was 5–3 and 10–6 in front of Charlton after the first and second sessions, and won 13–7, becoming the youngest-ever world championship semi-finalist, aged 21. Reardon had three breaks over 40 in the first frame against Taylor and won three of the next four for 4–1 before losing the next two and then finishing the first session 5–3 up. He extended his lead to 7–3, but Taylor then won six successive frames leaving Reardon 7–9 behind at the start of the last session. Taylor added a frame, but Reardon tied at 10–10 by winning the next three. From 11 to 11, Reardon missed several shots as Taylor won 13–11 for what Snooker Scene described in their match report as "the best win of his career".

=== Semi-finals ===
The semi-finals took place between 1 and 3 May as best-of-31-frames matches played over four sessions. Stevens led 5–2 against Higgins after winning four frames in a row from 1–2. Their second session finished at 7–7. Stevens made a number of mistakes during the third session, including missing a black from its spot when he was 8–9 behind and the session ended with him 9–13 in arrears. Higgins won the first frame of the fourth session. Stevens successfully potted a number of long-distance shots in taking the next two frames. He then won the 26th frame on the black to make it 12–14. Although Higgins appeared tense, he won the 27th frame on the pink and went on to secure a 16–13 victory.

Thorburn was 5–3 ahead of Taylor after their first session and, having won eight consecutive frames to lead 10–3, was 11–4 up at the end of the second session. Thorburn extended his lead to 15–7 by the end of the third session, then won 16–7 with a break of 114 in the 23rd frame.

=== Final ===
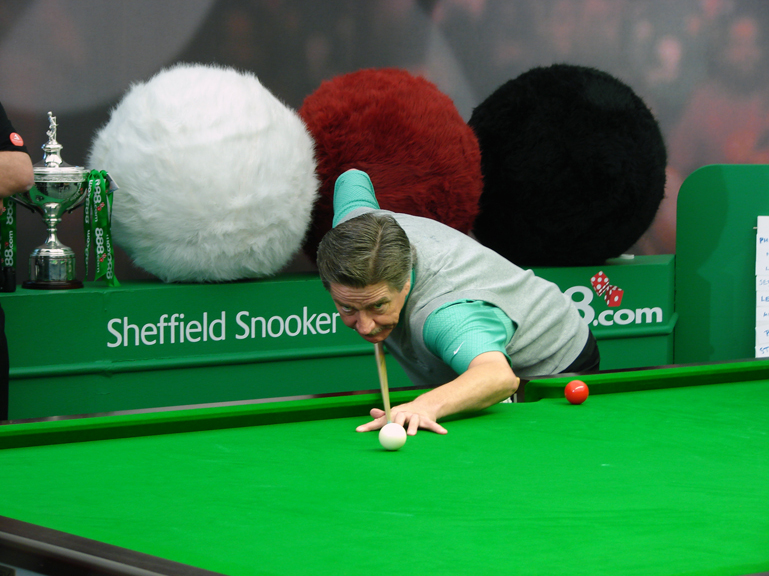
Cliff Thorburn (pictured in 2007) won the Championship.

The final, between Canadian Cliff Thorburn and Alex Higgins from Northern Ireland, took place on 4 and 5 May, as a best-of-35 frames match scheduled for four sessions. Higgins and Thorburn had an ongoing rivalry during their playing careers and were perceived as adversaries. Thorburn became the first player to reach a second final at the Crucible; he lost to Spencer in the first final played at the Crucible, in 1977. After Thorburn won the first frame, Higgins won the next five. Thorburn won the seventh to make it 5–2, with Higgins complaining after the frame that Thorburn had been standing in his line of sight, a claim that author and sports statistician Ian Morrison called "unfounded".

Higgins led 6–3 at the end of the first session, extending this to 9–5 before Thorburn levelled the match at 9–9. Writing in The Times, Sydney Friskin described the match to this point as a contrast of styles: "the shrewd cumulative processes of Thorburn against the explosive break-building of Higgins". He also noted that each player had accused the other of distracting them during the match. Thorburn won the 19th and 20th frames, with Higgins taking the following two to level at 11–11. Thorburn went ahead at 12–11 and 13–12, with Higgins then levelling the match both times, with the third session ending 13–13. In the final session, Higgins won the first frame; Thorburn then won the next two before Higgins equalised at 15–15. Thorburn led 16–15 and missed a brown ball that let Higgins in to make it 16–16. With a break of 119, Thorburn moved within a frame of victory at 17–16. In the 34th frame, leading 45–9 in points, he laid a snooker for Higgins, and made a 51 break after that to win the title.

The BBC's television coverage of the final had been interrupted by the broadcast of live coverage of the Iranian Embassy Siege, which caused numerous viewers to complain to the broadcaster. The conclusion of the final was watched by 14.5 million television viewers. Thorburn is generally regarded as the first player from outside Britain to win the world championship, with Horace Lindrum's victory in the 1952 World Snooker Championship usually being disregarded. (Note: Following a dispute over money between professional players and the Billiards Association and Control Council (BA&CC), the players decided to organise the 1952 World Professional Match-play Championship. The only players to enter the BA&CC's 1952 World Snooker Championship were Lindrum and Clark McConachy. According to Clive Everton, it was the World Professional Match-play Championship that was "recognised by the public as the genuine article.") After the match, Higgins said of Thorburn, "he's a grinder", and the nickname "The Grinder" was subsequently associated with Thorburn, seen as apt for his slow, determined style of play. Higgins also posed for pictures with a cake decorated with icing reading "World Champion 1980" that his wife Lynne had brought for him. In the snooker world rankings 1980/1981, based on the results at the three world championships from 1978 to 1980, Thorburn was ranked second (behind Reardon) and Higgins was placed fourth. Higgins won a second world championship in 1982, and Thorburn made the World Championship's first maximum break in 1983.

== Main draw ==
The results for the tournament are shown below. The numbers in brackets denote players seedings, whilst players in bold are match winners. (Note: The Crucible Almanac shows Spencer as the fourth seed and Charlton as the fifth seed; other sources show those placings reversed, e.g. "Champion goes down in snooker", The Sydney Morning Herald, 28 April 1980, p.28; The Times for 1 May 1980 states that Charlton was seeded 4th.)

**Round 1** Best of 19 frames
Patsy Fagan (IRL) (16) | 6
**Steve Davis (ENG)** | **10**
**Alex Higgins (NIR) (11)** | **10**
Tony Meo (ENG) | 9
Graham Miles (ENG) (9) | 3
**Kirk Stevens (CAN)** | **10**
**John Virgo (ENG) (10)** | **10**
Jim Meadowcroft (ENG) | 2
**Doug Mountjoy (WAL) (13)** | **10**
Cliff Wilson (WAL) | 6
John Pulman (ENG) (14) | 5
**Jim Wych (CAN)** | **10**
**David Taylor (ENG) (15)** | **10**
Ray Edmonds (ENG) | 3
**Bill Werbeniuk (CAN) (12)** | **10**
Willie Thorne (ENG) | 9

**Round 2** Best of 25 frames
Terry Griffiths (WAL) (1) | 10
**Steve Davis (ENG)** | **13**
Perrie Mans (RSA) (8) | 6
**Alex Higgins (NIR) (11)** | **13**
John Spencer (ENG) (5) | 8
**Kirk Stevens (CAN)** | **13**
**Eddie Charlton (AUS) (4)** | **13**
John Virgo (ENG) (10) | 12
**Cliff Thorburn (CAN) (3)** | **13**
Doug Mountjoy (WAL) (13) | 10
Dennis Taylor (NIR) (6) | 10
**Jim Wych (CAN)** | **13**
Fred Davis (ENG) (7) | 5
**David Taylor (ENG) (15)** | **13**
**Ray Reardon (WAL) (2)** | **13**
Bill Werbeniuk (CAN) (12) | 6

**Quarter-finals**; Best of 25 frames
(England) Steve Davis | 9
(Northern Ireland) **Alex Higgins (11)** | **13**
(Canada) **Kirk Stevens** | **13**
(Australia) Eddie Charlton (4) | 7
(Canada) **Cliff Thorburn (3)** | **13**
(Canada) Jim Wych | 6
(England) **David Taylor (15)** | **13**
(Wales) Ray Reardon (2) | 11

**Semi-finals**; Best of 31 frames
(Northern Ireland) **Alex Higgins (11)** | **16**
(Canada) Kirk Stevens | 13
(Canada) **Cliff Thorburn (3)** | **16**
(England) David Taylor (15) | 7

**Final**; Best of 35 frames
(Northern Ireland) Alex Higgins (11) | 16
(Canada) **Cliff Thorburn (3)** | **18**

Final: Best-of-35 frames. Referee: John Street; Crucible Theatre. 4 & 5 May 1980. Numbers in bold represent winning scores.
| **Cliff Thorburn** (Canada) | | | **18**–16 | | Alex Higgins (Northern Ireland) | | | | |
First session, 4 May (afternoon)
| Frame | 1 | 2 | 3 | 4 | 5 | 6 | 7 | 8 | 9 |
| Thorburn; 50+ Breaks | **52** - | 46 - | 5 - | 47 - | 26 - | 18 - | **74** (68) | 0 - | **62** (62) |
| Higgins; 50+ Breaks | 40 - | **55** - | **69** - | **61** - | **82** - | **98** (93) | 31 - | **81** (81) | 9 - |
| Frames (Thorburn first) | 1–0 | 1–1 | 1–2 | 1–3 | 1–4 | 1–5 | 2–5 | 2–6 | 3–6 |
Second session, 4 May (evening)
| Frame | 1 | 2 | 3 | 4 | 5 | 6 | 7 | 8 | 9 |
| Thorburn; 50+ Breaks | 49 - | **62** (53) | **86** (76) | 36 - | 45 - | **75** - | **67** - | **78** (57) | **95** (64) |
| Higgins; 50+ Breaks | **61** - | 58 (54) | 27 - | **75** - | **63** - | 17 - | 45 - | 38 - | 38 - |
| Frames (Thorburn first) | 3–7 | 4–7 | 5–7 | 5–8 | 5–9 | 6–9 | 7–9 | 8–9 | 9–9 |
Third session, 5 May (afternoon)
| Frame | 1 | 2 | 3 | 4 | 5 | 6 | 7 | 8 | |
| Thorburn; 50+ Breaks | **86** - | **60** - | 18 - | 27 - | **73** - | 51 - | **115** (58) | 61 - | |
| Higgins; 50+ Breaks | 14 - | 21 - | **70** - | **93** - | 43 - | **74** - | 25 - | **73** - | |
| Frames (Thorburn first) | 10–9 | 11–9 | 11–10 | 11–11 | 12–11 | 12–12 | 13–12 | 13–13 | |
Fourth session, 5 May (evening)
| Frame | 1 | 2 | 3 | 4 | 5 | 6 | 7 | 8 | 9 |
| Thorburn; 50+ Breaks | 21 - | **58** - | **100** (53) | 53 - | **73** - | 57 - | **119** (119) | **96** (51) | |
| Higgins; 50+ Breaks | **67** - | 47 - | 55 - | **55** - | 41 - | **63** - | 7 - | 9 - | |
| Frames (Thorburn first) | 13–14 | 14–14 | 15–14 | 15–15 | 16–15 | 16–16 | 17–16 | **18**–16 | |
| 119 | | | Highest break | | 93 | | | | |
| 1 | | | Century breaks | | 0 | | | | |
| 9 | | | 50+ breaks | | 3 | | | | |
**Cliff Thorburn wins the 1980 World Snooker Championship**

== Qualifying ==
The results from the qualifying competition are shown below, with match winners denoted in bold.

‡ indicates a player that was in the original draw (in January 1980) but did not compete.

First Round (best of 17 frames)
| Player | Score | Player |
|---|---|---|
| **Roy Amdor (RSA)** | **9**–7 | Bernie Mikkelsen (CAN) |
| **Joe Johnson (ENG)** | **9**–5 | Roy Andrewartha (WAL) |
| **Eddie Sinclair (SCO)** | **9**–5 | Mario Morra (CAN) |
| **Maurice Parkin (ENG)** | w/o–‡ | Gary Owen (WAL) |
| **Frank Jonik (CAN)** | **9**–7 | Mark Wildman (ENG) |

**Last 48**; Best of 17 frames
**Jackie Rea (NIR)** | **9**
Bernard Bennett (ENG) | 1
**Willie Thorne (ENG)** | **9**
Kevin Robitaille (CAN) | 4
**Steve Davis (ENG)** | **9**
Chris Ross (SCO) | 3
**Paddy Morgan (AUS)** | **9**
Paul Thornley (CAN) | 4
**Mike Hallett (ENG)** | **9**
Kingsley Kennerley (ENG) | 2
**Kirk Stevens (CAN)** | **9**
David Greaves (ENG) | 3
**Pat Houlihan (ENG)** | **9**
Joe Johnson (ENG) | 6
**Tony Meo (ENG)** | **9**
Jimmy van Rensberg (RSA) | 1
**Rex Williams (ENG)** | **9**
Roy Amdor (RSA) | 4
**Jim Wych (CAN)** | **9**
John Bear (CAN) | 5
Lou Condo (AUS) | ‡
Ian Anderson (AUS) | ‡
**Cliff Wilson (WAL)** | **9**
Frank Jonik (CAN) | 7
**Ray Edmonds (ENG)** | **9**
Maurice Parkin (ENG) | 2
**Sid Hood (ENG)** | **9**
John Dunning (ENG) | 7
Derek Mienie (RSA) | 7
**Eddie Sinclair (SCO)** | **9**
Jim Meadowcroft (ENG) | w/o
Jim Charlton (AUS) | ‡

**Last 32**; Best of 17 frames
Jackie Rea (NIR) | 1
**Willie Thorne (ENG)** | **9**
**Steve Davis (ENG)** | **9**
Paddy Morgan (AUS) | 0
Mike Hallett (ENG) | 3
**Kirk Stevens (CAN)** | **9**
Pat Houlihan (ENG) | 1
**Tony Meo (ENG)** | **9**
Rex Williams (ENG) | 7
**Jim Wych (CAN)** | **9**
Bye
**Cliff Wilson (WAL)**
**Ray Edmonds (ENG)** | **9**
Sid Hood (ENG) | 6
Eddie Sinclair (SCO) | 1
**Jim Meadowcroft (ENG)** | **9**

== Century breaks ==
There were 11 century breaks at the main championship. Kirk Stevens and Steve Davis each made a 136 break, the highest of the tournament. There was also a £5,000 bonus on offer for compiling a higher break than the championship record of 142. The only century break in the qualifying competition was a 108 scored by Pat Houlihan in his match against Joe Johnson.

- 136, 116 – Steve Davis
- 136 – Kirk Stevens
- 123, 104 – Doug Mountjoy
- 122 – Alex Higgins
- 119, 114 – Cliff Thorburn
- 108 – John Spencer
- 106 – Fred Davis
- 101 – Bill Werbeniuk
