= 1978–79 snooker world rankings =

The World Professional Billiards and Snooker Association, the governing body for professional snooker, first published official world rankings for players on the main tour for the 1976–77 season. Before this, the defending champion was seeded first, and the previous year's runner-up second, for each tournament.

For the 1978–79 season, players' performances in the previous three World Snooker Championships (1976, 1977, and 1978) contributed to their points total. For each of the three years, the World Champion was awarded five points, the runner-up received four, losing semi-finalists got three, players eliminated in the quarter-finals gained two, and losers in the last-16 round received a single point. If players were level on points, then those gained in the most recent event determined positioning. If this was still equal, then the losing margin on frames was taken into account.

Ray Reardon retained top place in the rankings from the 1977/1978 listing, with 12 points. Perrie Mans, the 1978 World Championship runner-up, was second, eight places higher than in the previous season's list, on 8 points. Eddie Charlton, who retained third place from the previous year's rankings, and John Spencer, who dropped from second to fourth, also had 8 points. The eight highest-ranked players were placed directly into the last-16 round of the 1979 World Snooker Championship, whilst all other entrants were required to participate in a qualifying competition to produce the eight players to play the exempted seeds.

== Rankings ==
The professional world rankings for the snooker players in the 1978–79 season are listed below. Points gained in each of the three World Snooker Championships are shown, with the total number of points given in the last column. A "–" symbol indicates that the player did not participate in that year's championship. (Note: It is unclear why five players with 0 points were included in the rankings.)

Snooker world rankings 1978/1979
Ranking	Name	1976	1977	1978	Total
1	Ray Reardon (WAL)	5	2	5	12
2	Perrie Mans (RSA)	3	1	4	8
3	Eddie Charlton (AUS)	3	2	3	8
4	John Spencer (ENG)	2	5	1	8
5	Cliff Thorburn (CAN)	1	4	2	7
6	Fred Davis (ENG)	2	1	3	6
7	Alex Higgins (NIR)	4	1	1	6
8	Dennis Taylor (NIR)	2	3	1	6
9	Graham Miles (ENG)	1	2	2	5
10	John Pulman (ENG)	1	3	1	5
11	Patsy Fagan (IRL)	–	1	2	3
12	Bill Werbeniuk (CAN)	1	–	2	3
13	David Taylor (ENG)	1	1	1	3
14	Doug Mountjoy (WAL)	–	2	1	3
15	Willie Thorne (ENG)	0	1	1	2
16	Jim Meadowcroft (ENG)	2	0	0	2
17	Rex Williams (ENG)	1	1	0	2
18	Pat Houlihan (ENG)	–	–	1	1
19	John Virgo (ENG)	–	1	0	1
20	John Dunning (ENG)	1	0	0	1
21	Gary Owen (WAL)	1	–	–	1
22	Warren Simpson (AUS)	0	–	–	0
23	Ian Anderson (AUS)	0	–	–	0
24	Marcus Owen (WAL)	0	–	–	0
25	Bernard Bennett (ENG)	0	0	0	0
26	Paddy Morgan (AUS)	0	–	0	0

Preceded by 1977/1978	1978/1979	Succeeded by 1979/1980
