= 1977 Dry Blackthorn Cup =

Invitational professional snooker tournament, December 1977

Dry Blackthorn Cup
Tournament information
- Dates: 21 December 1977
- Venue: Wembley Conference Centre
- City: London
- Country: England
- Format: Non-ranking event
- Total prize fund: £4,350
- Winner's share: £2,000
- Highest break: Ray Reardon (WAL) 77

Final
- Champion: Patsy Fagan (IRL)
- Runner-up: Alex Higgins (NIR)
- Score: 4–2

The 1977 Dry Blackthorn Cup was a professional invitational snooker tournament on 21 December 1977. Created by promoter Mike Barrett, it was played at the Wembley Conference Centre in London and featured four professional players. The participants included three players who between them had won each edition of the World Snooker Championship since 1969: John Spencer (1969, 1971, 1977), Ray Reardon (1970, 1973, 1974, 1975, 1976) and Alex Higgins (1972). The fourth player was Patsy Fagan, who had won the 1977 UK Championship earlier in the month.

The event attracted around 1,500 spectators and was televised, with a forty-minute programme on ITV being broadcast on Christmas Eve, 24 December 1977. Fagan won the tournament by defeating Higgins by 4 frames to 2 in the final. Reardon made the highest break of the competition, 77.

== Background ==
Created by promoter Mike Barrett, who later promoted boxing matches involving Frank Bruno, The 1977 Dry Blackthorn Cup was an invitational snooker event, named after the event's sponsors, a cider company based in Taunton. It took place at the Wembley Conference Centre in London and featured four professional players. This was the first snooker event to be held at the venue, which from 1979 to 2006 hosted the Masters Championship.

The tournament was played on a knockout basis, and all three matches were the best-of-seven frames. The participants included three players who between them had won each edition of the World Snooker Championship since 1969: John Spencer (1969, 1971, 1977), Ray Reardon (1970, 1973, 1974, 1975, 1976) and Alex Higgins (1972). The fourth player was Patsy Fagan, who had won the 1977 UK Championship earlier in the month. The event attracted around 1,500 spectators and was televised, with a forty-minute programme on ITV being broadcast on Christmas Eve, 24 December 1977.

== Tournament summary ==
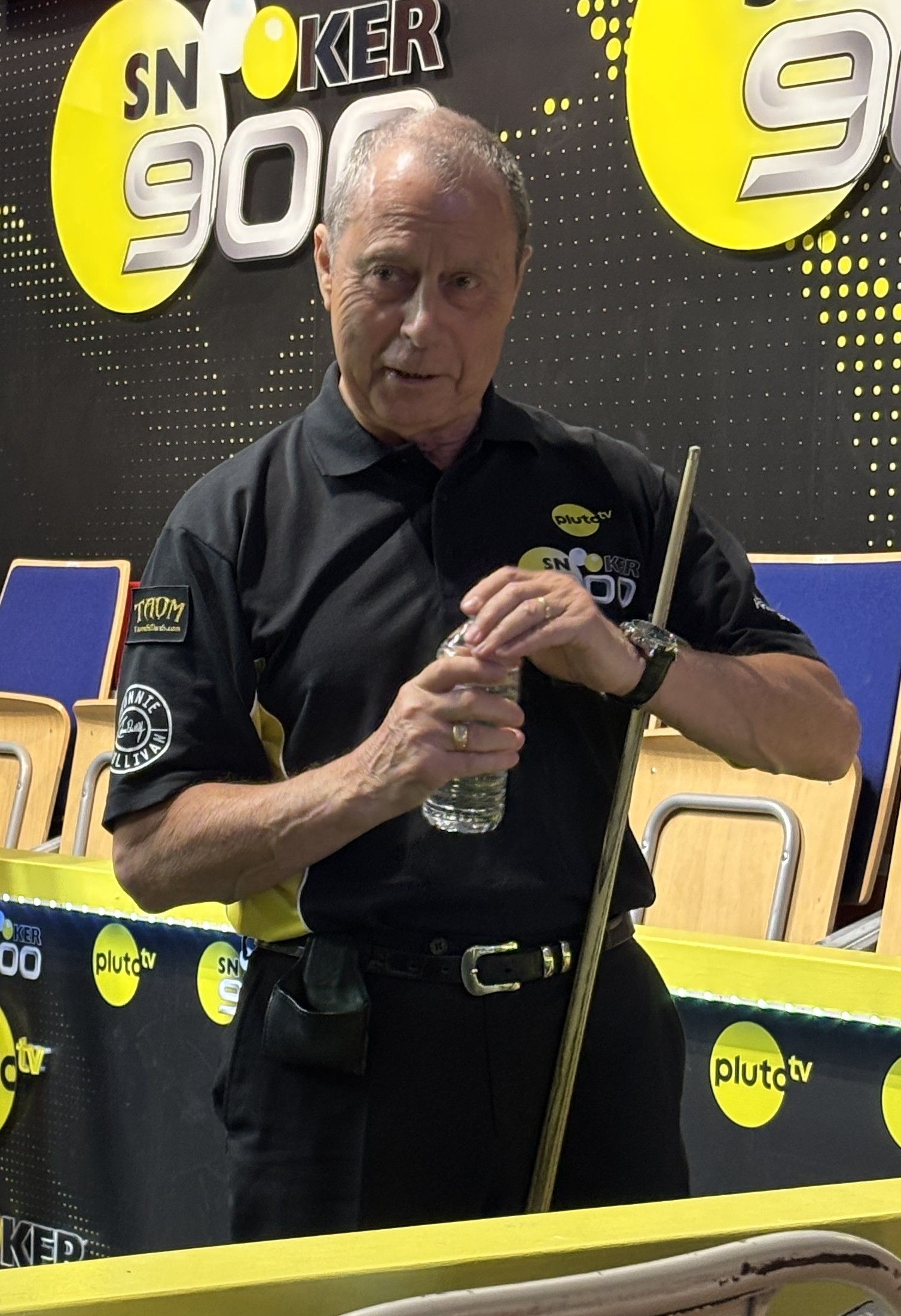
Patsy Fagan (pictured in 2026) won the tournament

In the semi-finals, Fagan faced Spencer, and Higgins played Reardon. Fagan won the first frame but lost the second after failing in an attempt to pot the last red ball, following which Spencer compiled a break of 30 and won the frame on the final black ball. Spencer had breaks of 43 and 51 in third frame and won it by 102 points to 28. The match was level at 2–2 when Fagan, having made a break of 25 early on, won the fourth frame. He was ahead in the fifth frame, after which Spencer made a 43 break which concluded when he opted to snooker Fagan rather than attempt a pot. Fagan escaped from the snooker successfully; he hit a red ball by sending the cue ball on a trajectory that saw it rebound from four cushions. He went on to add the frame to his tally. A break of 53 early in the sixth frame contributed to Fagan taking a 58-point lead in the sixth frame, but the break ended when he failed in an attempt to pot the next ball. Spencer followed this with a break of 32, but after failing to pot the yellow ball when only the colours were left and leaving it in a position close to the pocket, where Fagan could easily pot it, Spencer conceded the match.

Higgins took three of the first four frame against Reardon, making breaks of 44, 36, 30 and 64 in the process. Reardon won the third frame with a break of 77, the highest of the tournament. in the fifth frame, Higgins recorded a 42 break, but Reardon prevailed, concluding with a break of 48. Higgins secured his progression to the final with a 28 break after Reardon erred with a safety shot in the sixth frame.

In the final, Higgins won the first frame after a break of 38. Fagan equalised with a 58 break in the second frame and took the lead with breaks of 62 and 53 contributing to a 123–1 points score in the next frame. Higgins then levelled the match at 2–2. Both players made errors during the fifth frame, won by Fagan. Higgins established a 39–22 points lead in the sixth frame, but Fagan exhibited high-quality safety play and won the frame after potting a long-distance green ball then completing a clearance to secure the title. The reporter for Snooker Scene magazine wrote that "winning two important tournaments within a month confirms not so much an advance in his technique as Fagan's ability—hitherto in doubt—of being able to win on the showcase occasion" and praised his "soundness and consistency".

Fagan received prize money of £2,000 as the winner, and Higgins received £1,000 as runner-up. Spencer and Reardon received £500 each as losers in the semi-finals. £50,000 would have been awarded to any player making a maximum break of 147. To cover the potential award of the maximum break prize, promoter Mike Barrett paid an insurance premium of £500. Players making breaks of over 100 points would have been rewarded with £100 for each one; breaks of 50 or more attracted a prize of £50. The total prize fund of £4,350 was a record for a one-day snooker tournament.

The following year, Barrett promoted the 1978 Champion of Champions event at the same venue. Like the Dry Blackthorn Cup, this was an invitational event for four players. Fagan, Reardon and Higgins participated in the 1978 tournament, along with Doug Mountjoy.

== Main draw ==
Results are shown below. Players in bold are match winners.

**Semi-finals**; Best of 7 frames		**Final**; Best of 7 frames
**Patsy Fagan (IRL)**	**4**
John Spencer (ENG)	2	(Republic of Ireland) **Patsy Fagan**	**4**
**Alex Higgins (NIR)**	**4**	(Northern Ireland) Alex Higgins	2
Ray Reardon (WAL)	2
