= 1979 World Snooker Championship =

Professional snooker tournament

1979 Embassy World Snooker Championship
Tournament information
- Dates: 16–28 April 1979
- Venue: Crucible Theatre
- City: Sheffield
- Country: England
- Organisation: WPBSA
- Format: Ranking event
- Total prize fund: £35,000
- Winner's share: £10,000
- Highest break: Bill Werbeniuk (CAN) (142)

Final
- Champion: Terry Griffiths (WAL)
- Runner-up: Dennis Taylor (NIR)
- Score: 24–16

The 1979 World Snooker Championship (officially known as the 1979 Embassy World Snooker Championship) was a ranking professional snooker tournament that took place from 16 to 28 April 1979 at the Crucible Theatre in Sheffield, England. Promoted by Mike Watterson for the World Professional Billiards and Snooker Association, it was the third consecutive World Snooker Championship to be held at the Crucible, the first tournament having taken place in 1977.

A qualifying event for the championship was held from 25 March to 7 April, producing eight qualifiers who joined the eight invited seeded players in the main event staged from 16 to 28 April. The main tournament was broadcast in the United Kingdom by the BBC, and was sponsored by the Embassy cigarette company. The winner received £10,000 from the total prize fund of £35,000. Steve Davis, Terry Griffiths and Kirk Stevens all qualified for the Crucible stage for the first time. The defending champion was Ray Reardon, who had won the title for a sixth time by defeating Perrie Mans by 25 frames to 18 in the 1978 final. Reardon was eliminated in the quarter-finals after losing 8–13 to Dennis Taylor.

Griffiths met Taylor in the final, which was a best-of-47-frame match. Griffiths won 24–16, to become the first player to proceed from the qualifying competition and win the title at the Crucible. There were 13 century breaks compiled during the championship, the highest of which was a championship record-equalling 142 by Bill Werbeniuk.

== Background ==
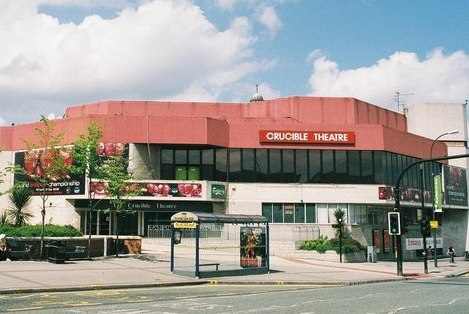
The tournament was held at the Crucible Theatre (pictured in 2005)

The World Snooker Championship is the preeminent tournament in professional snooker. Joe Davis won the first edition, in 1927 at Camkin's Hall in Birmingham, England. Since 1977, the venue for the tournament, held annually, has been the Crucible Theatre, Sheffield. The 1979 tournament was promoted for the World Professional Billiards and Snooker Association by Mike Watterson and featured professional players competing in one-on-one snooker matches in a single-elimination format, each match played over a defined number of frames. The eight highest-ranked players from the Snooker world rankings 1978/1979 were placed directly into the last-16 round of the main tournament in 1979, whilst all other entrants were required to participate in a qualifying competition to produce the eight players to play the exempted seeds. The defending champion was Ray Reardon, who had won his sixth world title by defeating Perrie Mans 25–18 in the 1978 final. The 1979 tournament was a ranking event. It received daily BBC television coverage, and was sponsored by cigarette brand Embassy. Following the qualifying competition that was held from 25 March to 7 April, the main tournament took place from 16 to 28 April.

== Prize fund ==
The breakdown of prize money for this year is shown below:

- Winner: £10,000
- Runner-up: £5,000
- Third place: £3,000
- Fourth place: £2,000
- Quarter-final: £1,250
- Last 16: £1,000
- Highest break: £500
- Maximum break: £10,000 (not awarded)
- Total: £35,500

== Tournament summary ==
=== Qualifying ===
The qualifying competition took place from 25 March to 7 April at Romiley Forum, Stockport, and the Northern Snooker Centre, Leeds. Played over two rounds, with each match a best-of-17 frame contest, it produced eight qualifying players who joined the top eight seeded players in the main competition. There were 11 matches in the preliminary round. Bernard Bennett took a 2–0 lead against Terry Griffiths, but lost 2–9. Pat Houlihan won five consecutive frames from 4–5 behind against John Barrie to progress to the next round. Willie Thorne compiled a 131 break in the second frame of his 9–3 victory against Jim Charlton. John Virgo recorded a break of 137 in the seventh frame of his whitewash of Maurice Parkin. Veteran Jackie Rea took the first two frames against John Dunning, but then lost the tip from his cue during the third frame, and, using a borrowed cue, saw Dunning level the match at 2–2. He reverted to using his own cue, now retipped, but the tip came off again and he eventually lost 5–9. Roy Andrewartha won the deciding frame against Ray Edmonds. Tournament debutants Steve Davis and Kirk Stevens both achieved 9–1 wins, against Ian Anderson and Roy Amdor respectively.

In the qualifying round, Virgo won the last four frames, which included a break of 120 in frame 15, to eliminate Thorne 9–8. In a match that lasted over nine hours, David Taylor won the deciding frame against Dunning. Stevens whitewashed former champion John Pulman. In the other matches, Bill Werbeniuk defeated Andrewartha 9–2, Doug Mountjoy won 9–6 against Houlihan, Davis eliminated Patsy Fagan 9–2, Jim Meadowcroft lost 6–9 to Griffiths, and Rex Williams lost 5–9 to Graham Miles. Davis, Griffiths, and Stevens all qualified for the Crucible stage for the first time.

=== First round ===
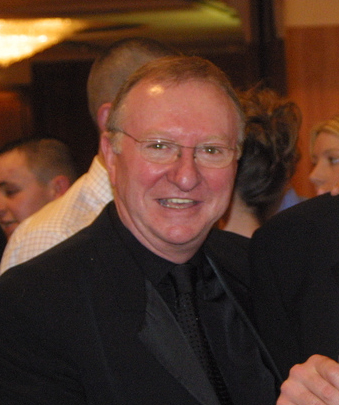
Dennis Taylor (pictured in 2004) eliminated defending champion Reardon in the quarter-finals, and finished as runner-up.

Before the main competition started, Coral made Reardon their bookmaker's favourite, at odds of 2–1, followed by Eddie Charlton at 5–1, and John Spencer and Alex Higgins who were each priced at 6–1. The first round took place between 16 and 20 April, with matches scheduled three over sessions as the best of 25 frames. Fred Davis made a break of 109, the first century break in that year's main competition, to level at 3–3 with Stevens, but finished their first session 3–5 behind. Aged 65 years and 247 days, he became the oldest ever player to win a match at the Crucible when he defeated Stevens 13–8.

Werbeniuk defeated Spencer 13–11, and said that he was treating a nerve-related trembling in his cue arm by drinking lager. Cliff Thorburn, runner-up in 1977, compiled a break of 125 in the second session against Virgo, but lost the match 10–13. David Taylor, who had defeated Higgins earlier in the season at the 1978 UK Championship, lost 5–13 to him. Charlton made a 95 break to complete a 13–6 win against Mountjoy. Defending champion Reardon trailed Miles 3–5 after their first session, but then won eight of the nine frames in the second session. Griffiths defeated Mans 13–8, and Steve Davis lost 11–13 to Dennis Taylor.

=== Quarter-finals ===
The quarter-finals were played as best-of-25-frames matches over three sessions between 19 and 21 April. Higgins made breaks of 105 and 112 in the second and third frames respectively of his match against Griffiths, and finished the first session leading 6–2. Griffiths drew level at 8–8 in the second session, aided by a 121 break. Griffiths took the final frame with a 107 break to win won 13–12; it was the third world championship in a row where Higgins was defeated in a deciding frame.

Charlton defeated Fred Davis 13–4, after taking a 5–0 lead. Davis compiled a 110 break in the eighth frame. Reardon took an early lead of 5–2 against Dennis Taylor; the players were later level at 7–7 when Reardon was distracted by applause from spectators at the other table at the venue, and missed an attempt to pot a brown. Taylor won that frame, and the next, to lead 9–7 after two sessions. He won only one further frame, as Taylor achieved victory at 13–8. Virgo built an 8–1 lead against Webeniuk in their first session, and was six frames clear after the second session, at 11–5. Werbeniuk won the initial frame of the third session, and in the next frame equalled the record championship break of 142 that had been set by Williams in 1965. The prize money for the tournament's highest break was £500, whilst beating the record would have earnt an additional £5,000. Werbeniuk received a further £500 donated jointly from tournament promoter Watterson, Harmsworth, manufacturers of the cloth used on the snooker tables at the event, and tournament table makers Karnehm and Hillman. Virgo won 13–9.

=== Semi-finals and third place playoff ===
The semi-finals took place between 22 and 25 April as best-of-37-frames matches played over four sessions. Griffiths recorded a 101 break in the second frame against Charlton, and after leading 4–3 after one session, increased his advantage during the second session to 10–4. Despite a highest break of just 46, Charlton won the next six frames to draw level. Griffiths won the last frame of the second day to take an 11–10 lead into the concluding day; at the close of the fifth session he was two frames up, at 15–13. The last session ended at 1:40 a.m., having taken five hours and 25 minutes to play, and set a record for the latest finish of any match. This duration was just eight minutes less than the longest world championship session on record, which occurred during Reardon and Fred Davis's match in 1969. Charlton led for the first time in the match at 16–15, and was again a frame ahead at 17–16. Griffiths took the next two frames, and completed his passage into the final at 19–17 after Charlton, who was leading by 48 points, missed an attempt to pot a red while using the half-butt. Griffiths compiled a 97 break to secure victory. In a post-match interview with David Vine, Griffiths said "I'm in the final now, you know", with what snooker historian Clive Everton described as "an engaging mixture of pride and disbelief".

Taylor led after each session against Virgo, with his three frame advantage after the initial session increasing by an additional frame after each of the following three sessions, from 5–2 to 9–5, 13–8, and 17–11. According to Snooker Scene, Taylor displayed the "more mature match temperament" throughout, while Virgo "fumed visibly" after he made errors or was unlucky. Taylor won 19–12.

Charlton defeated Virgo 7–3 in the third-place playoff match.

=== Final ===
The final, between Dennis Taylor and Terry Griffiths, took place from 26 to 28 April, as a best-of-47 frames match scheduled over six sessions, and was refereed by John Williams. Griffiths miscued three times in four shots during the first frame, but won it on the final pink ball. Griffiths led 3–1 when in the fifth frame he recorded a break of 120 which broke down on the final brown ball; had he potted the four remaining colours he would have equalled the championship record break of 142. Having increased his lead to 5–1 before the last frame of the first session, he made a break of 65 in the seventh frame, but Taylor countered with a 71 break win the frame on the final black ball and make it 5–2. In the second session, Griffiths took the 15th frame after the pair had been tied at 7–7. The next day, Taylor took an 11–9 lead, and later led 14–12, before Griffiths won twelve of the following 14 frames. With the pair level at 15–15 at the start of the final day of play, Griffiths added two of the next three frames for a 17–16 lead, then won seven consecutive frames, to secure victory at 24–16.

Griffiths became the first qualifier to win the title at the Crucible. After the match, he commented that he "didn't really feel I was playing for the championship until the last day ...Once I saw the winning post, Dennis did seem to fade a bit." Fred Davis hailed Griffith's victory as "the greatest achievement the game's ever known", adding that for a player without experience of long matches to win the title was "just remarkable". Everton wrote that Griffiths was "the first authentic television age champion, a working class hero".

== Main draw ==
The results for the tournament are shown below. The numbers in brackets denote players seedings, whilst players in bold are match winners.

**Last 16**; Best of 25 frames
17, 18 & 19 April
**Ray Reardon (WAL) (1)**	**13**
Graham Miles (ENG)	8
18 & 19 April
**Dennis Taylor (NIR) (8)**	**13**
Steve Davis (ENG)	11
19 & 20 April
Cliff Thorburn (CAN) (5)	10
**John Virgo (ENG)**	**13**
17 & 18 April
John Spencer (ENG) (4)	11
**Bill Werbeniuk (CAN)**	**13**
16 & 17 April
**Eddie Charlton (AUS) (3)**	**13**
Doug Mountjoy (WAL)	6
16, 17 & 18 April
**Fred Davis (ENG) (6)**	**13**
Kirk Stevens (CAN)	8
16, 17 & 18 April
**Alex Higgins (NIR) (7)**	**13**
David Taylor (ENG)	5
16 & 17 April
Perrie Mans (RSA) (2)	8
**Terry Griffiths (WAL)**	**13**

**Quarter-finals**; Best of 25 frames
20 & 21 April
(Wales) Ray Reardon (1)	8
(Northern Ireland) **Dennis Taylor (8)**	**13**
20 & 21 April
(England) **John Virgo**	**13**
(Canada) Bill Werbeniuk	9
19, 20 & 21 April
(Australia) **Eddie Charlton (3)**	**13**
(England) Fred Davis (6)	4
19, 20 & 21 April
(Northern Ireland) Alex Higgins (7)	12
(Wales) **Terry Griffiths**	**13**

**Semi-finals**; Best of 37 frames
22, 23, 24 & 25 April
(Northern Ireland) **Dennis Taylor (8)**	**19**
(England) John Virgo	12
22, 23, 24 & 25 April
(Australia) Eddie Charlton (3)	17
(Wales) **Terry Griffiths**	**19**

**Final**; Best of 47 frames
26, 27 & 28 April
(Northern Ireland) Dennis Taylor (8)	16
(Wales) **Terry Griffiths**	**24**
**Third place** Best of 13 frames
26 & 27 April
(England) John Virgo	3
(Australia) **Eddie Charlton (3)**	**7**

== Qualifying ==
The results from the qualifying competition are shown below, with match winners denoted in bold:

Preliminary Round (Best of 17 frames)Venues: Romiley Forum, Stockport; Northern Snooker Centre, Leeds
Player	Score	Player
Doug Mountjoy (WAL)	**9**–1	Derek Mienie (RSA)
Terry Griffiths (WAL)	**9**–2	Bernard Bennett (ENG)
Pat Houlihan (ENG)	**9**–5	John Barrie (ENG)
Willie Thorne (ENG)	**9**–3	Jim Charlton (AUS)
John Virgo (ENG)	**9**–0	Maurice Parkin (ENG)
John Dunning (ENG)	**9**–5	Jackie Rea (NIR)
Rex Williams (ENG)	**9**–2	David Greaves (ENG)
Jim Meadowcroft (ENG)	**9**–7	Jimmy van Rensberg (RSA)
Roy Andrewartha (WAL)	**9**–8	Ray Edmonds (ENG)
Steve Davis (ENG)	**9**–1	Ian Anderson (AUS)
Kirk Stevens (CAN)	**9**–1	Roy Amdor (RSA)

Qualifying Round (Best of 17 frames)Venue: Romiley Forum, Stockport
Player	Score	Player
John Virgo (ENG)	**9**–8	Willie Thorne (ENG)
Bill Werbeniuk (CAN)	**9**–2	Roy Andrewartha (WAL)
David Taylor (ENG)	**9**–8	John Dunning (ENG)
Doug Mountjoy (WAL)	**9**–6	Pat Houlihan (ENG)
Steve Davis (ENG)	**9**–2	Patsy Fagan (IRL)
Terry Griffiths (WAL)	**9**–6	Jim Meadowcroft (ENG)
Kirk Stevens (CAN)	**9**–0	John Pulman (ENG)
Graham Miles (ENG)	**9**–5	Rex Williams (ENG)

== Century breaks ==
There were 13 century breaks at the championship, the highest being 142 by Werbeniuk. There was also a £5,000 bonus for compiling a higher break than the championship record of 142.

- 142 – Bill Werbeniuk
- 125 – Cliff Thorburn
- 121, 120, 107, 101 – Terry Griffiths
- 112, 105 – Alex Higgins
- 112 – John Spencer
- 110, 109 – Fred Davis
- 106 – Eddie Charlton
- 106 – Dennis Taylor
