= Patsy Fagan =

Irish snooker player

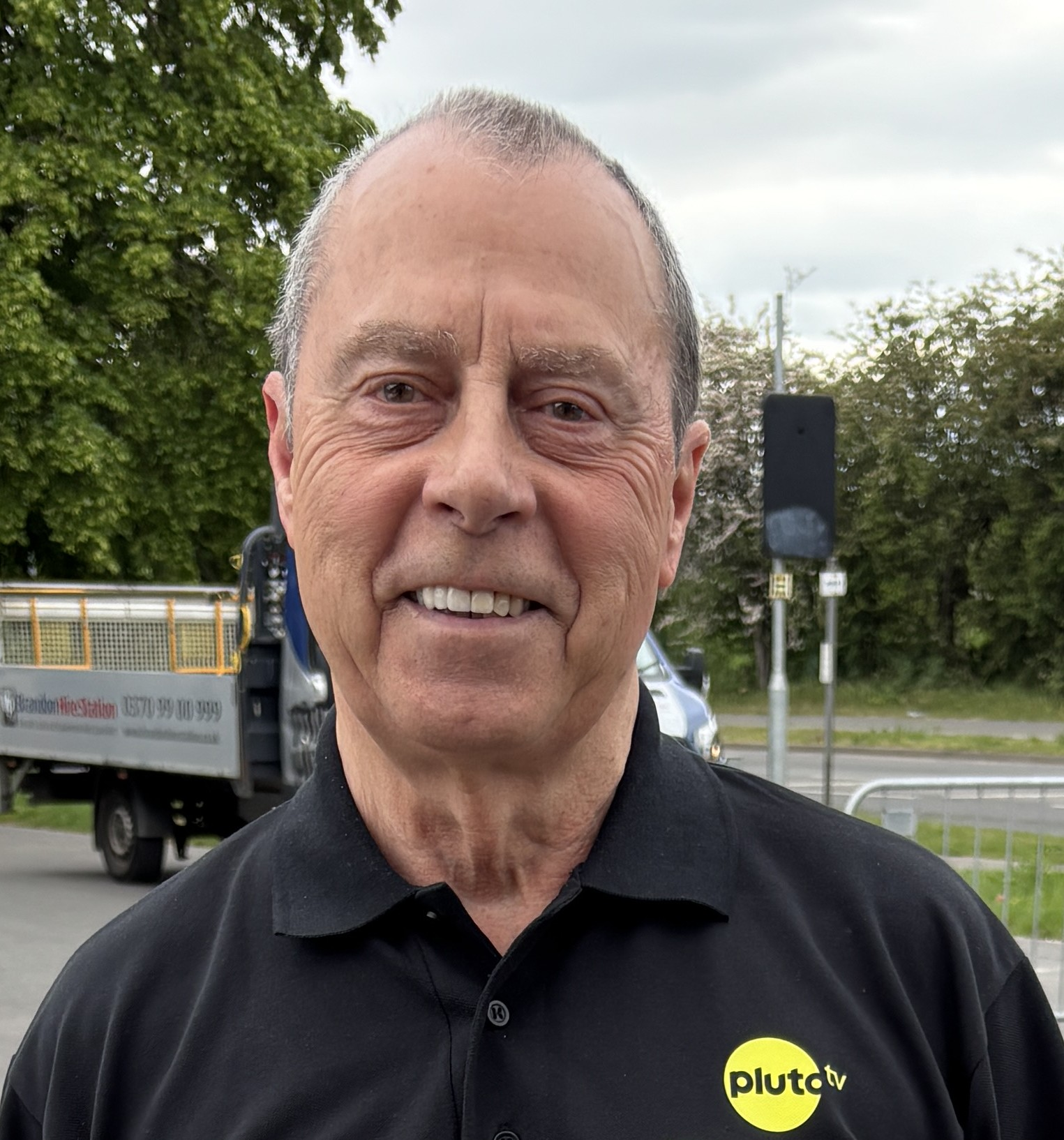
- Fagan in 2026

Personal information
- Born: 15 January 1951 (age 75) Dublin, Ireland

Sport
- Country: Ireland
- Sport: Snooker
- Professional: 1976–1989
- Highest ranking: 11 (1978/79)
- Best ranking finish: Quarter-final (×1)

Patsy Fagan (born 15 January 1951) is an Irish former professional snooker player. Having been runner-up in the 1974 English Amateur Championship, he turned professional in October 1976. He experienced early success with victories at the 1977 UK Championship and the 1977 Dry Blackthorn Cup but following a car accident, developed a psychological block when using the rest which affected his playing and he did not win another title. He lost his professional status in 1989 following a 2–9 playoff defeat by Brady Gollan and now works as a snooker coach. His highest career ranking was 11, in 1978/79.

== Early life and amateur career ==
Fagan was born in Dublin on 15 January 1951, one of twelve children. He started playing snooker at the age of 12, and moved to London in 1968.

He played at the Chiswick Memorial Club, and in 1974 it was reported in a local newspaper that in a six-frame session he had recorded a break of 106, another over 80, and three more over 70. In the 1974 English Amateur Championship, he defeated Mick Fisher 6–1 in the Southern section final before being beaten 7–11 by the reigning world amateur champion Ray Edmonds in the main final. In 1975, Fagan became the youngest player ever to win the London and Home Counties billiards championship, playing with a focus on potting the red ball as he defeated Ron Riggins 1,176–881 in the final. In the 1975 English Amateur Snooker Championship he lost 1–4 to Terry Griffiths in the Southern region quarter-finals, and in the 1976 Southern area final he lost 6–8 to Chris Ross despite making a tournament record break of 115.

In 1974, Fagan won a money match against Alex Higgins for £2,000, an amount equal to that received by the winner of the 1974 World Snooker Championship.

== Early professional success ==
Regarded as "one of the most exciting players of the mid-seventies", and "one of the men most likely to succeed when he turned professional", Fagan turned professional in October 1976. He made his first maximum break on 15 January 1977, his 26th birthday, against Dave Gilbert at the Clapton Bus Garage Social Club. At the 1977 World Snooker Championship, he beat Jim Meadowcroft 11–9 in qualifying and then lost 7–13 to defending champion Ray Reardon in the last 16, having finished the first session of the match level at 4–4 and the second 7–10 behind. Reardon then won all three frames in the final session, taking the last two of them on the black. The matches between Fagan and Reardon, and between Fred Davis and John Pulman, were the first to be held at the Crucible Theatre, which as of 2022 had remained as the venue for the World Snooker Championship for 45 years.

At the UK Championship in 1977, which at the time was a non-ranking event open only to UK passport holders, Fagan beat Jackie Rea 5–1 in the first round, and Fred Davis 5–0 in the second round. He won in the deciding frame in each of the next two rounds, 5–4 against Jim Meadowcroft in the quarter-finals and 9–8 against John Virgo in the semi-finals, to reach the final against another player in his first year as a professional, Doug Mountjoy. The two finalists shared the first four frames but Fagan won the next four to take a 6–2 lead, after which Mountjoy also won four frames in a row to level the match at 6–6. Fagan then took the next two frames to lead 8–6, eventually winning the match 12–9.

Before the UK championship, Fagan had been announced as one of the four invited contenders for the 1977 Dry Blackthorn Cup, along with world championship winners Alex Higgins, John Spencer and Reardon. He beat Spencer in the semi-final then Higgins 4–2 in the final to win the tournament. He received £2,000 prize money for his Dry Blackthorn Cup win, the same amount he had received for his UK championship victory a couple of weeks earlier.

== Later professional career ==
Fagan failed to make an impact at the 1978 Masters, losing 2–4 to John Pulman in the first round. At the 1978 World Snooker Championship he beat John Dunning 9–5 and then Alex Higgins 13–12. In the match against Higgins, Fagan was 10–12 behind but won two frames on the black and the last on the pink. He lost 10–13 to Fred Davis in the quarter-finals.

In the 1970s and until 1982, the Irish Professional Championship was played on a challenge basis, and in April 1978 Fagan played defending champion Alex Higgins for the title. Fagan was a frame ahead after the first day of the match, at 5–4. At the start of the next day's play he extended his lead to 8–5 before Higgins drew level at 8–8 and then won seven of the next nine to leave Fagan 10–15 behind at the end of the second day. Higgins won the match 21–13.

Entering the 1978 UK Championship as defending champion, Fagan lost the first four frames of his opening match against David Taylor before tying the match at 4–4, eventually losing 7–9. He was also defeated by Taylor in the first round of the 1979 Masters, losing 3–5 after having been 3–2 ahead. From late 1978, following a car accident, Fagan started to experience a psychological block when using the rest. This version of the "yips" caused him to spend a long time cueing and then usually miscueing; because of this, he would play left-handed rather than using the rest where possible. This problem affected his match against Taylor at the Masters in January 1979. Two months later, he challenged Higgins again for the Irish Professional title. Higgins won the match 21–12, making a break of 124 in 2 minutes and 45 seconds on the final day.

Fagan was part of the "rest of the world" team at the 1979 World Challenge Cup, along with Perrie Mans and Jimmy van Rensberg. In their match against the Northern Ireland team, Fagan lost 0–1 to Dennis Taylor on the first day, in a match where Taylor asked him to play again after Fagan had fouled by touching the blue ball with his sleeve whilst using the rest in attempting to hit the yellow ball. Fagan was quoted afterwards as saying "Dennis took advantage of my rest problems but it didn't bother me." On the second day, he beat Jackie Rea 1–0 but then lost 0–3 to Higgins on the second. Northern Ireland won the match 8–7 after having been 2–7 behind. Fagan and his fellow team members also lost 7–8 against the England team.

Dennis Taylor also beat Fagan in the quarter-finals of the 1979 UK Championship, 9–6, after Fagan had knocked out Mike Hallett 9–4 and Graham Miles 9–5. In the 1980 World Snooker Championship Fagan lost in his first match, 6–10 to Steve Davis. He lost to Dennis Taylor in a challenge for the Irish Professional Championship in 1981, coming from 0–3 down to lead 5–4 at the end of the first session, and 10–8 at the close of the second session. The third session saw Fagan make a break of 107 on his way to building a 15–12 lead. However, Taylor retained the title, winning 22–21.

A 2–9 professional playoff defeat by Brady Gollan in April 1989 meant that Fagan lost his professional status. His highest career ranking had been 11, in 1978/79, and his best finish in a ranking tournament was reaching the quarter-final at the 1978 World Snooker Championship. He subsequently worked as a landscape gardener and a night-shift sorter for the Post Office. Fagan works as a snooker coach and has coached the Paddington professional Alfie Burden, who was the world amateur champion in 2009. Ronnie O'Sullivan sought coaching advice from Fagan in 2011.

He entered the 2021 World Seniors Championship, losing 0–3 to Stephen Hendry in the first round.

== Performance and rankings timeline ==
Tournament	1974/ 75	1975/ 76	1976/ 77	1977/ 78	1978/ 79	1979/ 80	1980/ 81	1981/ 82	1982/ 83	1983/ 84	1984/ 85	1985/ 86	1986/ 87	1987/ 88	1988/ 89	1989/ 90
Ranking	(Note: He was an amateur.)		(Note: New players on the Main Tour do not have a ranking.)	19	11	16	18	27	23	25	38	33	42	75	103	123
Ranking tournaments
International Open (Note: The event was also called the Goya Matchroom Trophy (1985/1986))	Tournament Not Held							NR	LQ	LQ	LQ	1R	WD	LQ	LQ	A
Grand Prix (Note: The event was also called the Professional Players Tournament (1982/93–1983/1984))	Tournament Not Held								1R	1R	WD	LQ	1R	LQ	LQ	A
Dubai Classic (Note: The event was also called the Dubai Masters (1988/1989))	Tournament Not Held														NR	LQ
UK Championship	Not Held			Non-Ranking Event							LQ	1R	LQ	LQ	LQ	A
Classic	Tournament Not Held					Non-Ranking Event				1R	1R	LQ	WD	LQ	LQ	A
British Open (Note: The event was also called the British Gold Cup (1979/1980), Yamaha Organs Trophy (1980/1981) and International Masters (1981/1982–1983/1984))	Tournament Not Held					Non-Ranking Event					LQ	2R	LQ	LQ	LQ	A
European Open	Tournament Not Held														LQ	A
World Championship	A	A	1R	QF	LQ	1R	LQ	2R	LQ	LQ	2R	LQ	LQ	LQ	LQ	A
Non-ranking tournaments
The Masters	A	A	A	1R	1R	A	A	A	A	A	A	A	A	A	A	A
Irish Masters	A	A	A	A	A	A	A	A	A	A	A	SF	A	A	A	A
Pontins Professional	A	A	A	RR	A	A	A	A	A	A	A	A	A	A	A	A
Former ranking tournaments
Canadian Masters (Note: The event was also called the Canadian Open (1978/1979–1980/1981))	Non-Ranking Event							Tournament Not Held				Non-Ranking			LQ	NH
Former non-ranking tournaments
Watney Open	QF	Tournament Not Held														
Dry Blackthorn Cup	Not Held			W	Tournament Not Held											
Champion of Champions	Tournament Not Held				SF	NH	A	Tournament Not Held								
Holsten Lager International	Tournament Not Held				1R	Tournament Not Held										
Bombay International	Tournament Not Held				RR	A	Tournament Not Held									
International Open (Note: The event was also called the Goya Matchroom Trophy (1985/1986))	Tournament Not Held							1R	Ranking Event							
UK Championship	Not Held			W	2R	QF	2R	LQ	2R	A	Ranking Event					
British Open (Note: The event was also called the British Gold Cup (1979/1980), Yamaha Organs Trophy (1980/1981) and International Masters (1981/1982–1983/1984))	Tournament Not Held					RR	LQ	LQ	LQ	LQ	Ranking Event					
Pot Black	A	A	A	A	A	A	A	A	A	A	A	1R	Tournament Not Held			
Irish Professional Championship	Tournament Not Held			F	F	A	F	QF	SF	NH	SF	1R	1R	1R	WD	NH

Performance Table Legend
LQ	lost in the qualifying draw	#R	lost in the early rounds of the tournament (WR = Wildcard round, RR = Round robin)	QF	lost in the quarter-finals
SF	lost in the semi-finals	F	lost in the final	W	won the tournament
DNQ	did not qualify for the tournament	A	did not participate in the tournament	WD	withdrew from the tournament

NH / Not Held	means an event was not held.
NR / Non-Ranking Event	means an event is/was no longer a ranking event.
R / Ranking Event	means an event is/was a ranking event.

== Career finals ==
=== Non-ranking finals: 6 (3 titles) ===
Outcome	No.	Year	Championship	Opponent in the final	Score	Ref.
Winner	1.	1977	UK Championship	(Wales) Doug Mountjoy	12–9	
Winner	2.	1977	Dry Blackthorn Cup	(Northern Ireland) Alex Higgins	4–2	
Winner	3.	1978	Suffolk Professional Invitational	(Northern Ireland) Alex Higgins	7–3	
Runner-up	1.	1978	Irish Professional Championship	(Northern Ireland) Alex Higgins	13–21	
Runner-up	2.	1979	Irish Professional Championship (2)	(Northern Ireland) Alex Higgins	12–21	
Runner-up	3.	1981	Irish Professional Championship (3)	(Northern Ireland) Dennis Taylor	21–22	

=== Pro-am finals: 2 (2 titles) ===
Outcome	No.	Year	Championship	Opponent in the final	Score	Ref.
Winner	1.	1977	Billy Hill Trophy	(Scotland) Eddie Sinclair	8–4	
Winner	2.	1977	Louth Town & Country Club Pro-am	(England) John Virgo	8–5	

=== Amateur finals: 1 ===
Outcome	No.	Year	Championship	Opponent in the final	Score	Ref.
Runner-up	1.	1974	English Amateur Championship	(England) Ray Edmonds	7–11	
