= 1977 UK Championship =

1977 Super Crystalate UK Championship
Tournament information
- Dates: 26 November – 3 December 1977
- Venue: Tower Circus
- City: Blackpool
- Country: England
- Organisation: WPBSA
- Format: Non-ranking event
- Total prize fund: £7,000
- Winner's share: £2,000
- Highest break: Alex Higgins (NIR) (129)

Final
- Champion: Patsy Fagan (IRL)
- Runner-up: Doug Mountjoy (WAL)
- Score: 12–9

The 1977 UK Championship (officially the 1977 Super Crystalate UK Championship) was a professional non-ranking snooker tournament that took place at the Tower Circus in Blackpool between 26 November and 3 December 1977.

Mike Watterson instituted this new championship with sponsorship from manufacturers of the Super Crystalate balls. The inaugural UK Championship was held in Blackpool, but the following year the tournament moved to the Guild Hall in Preston, where it remained for twenty years.

The event was won by Patsy Fagan, a London-based Dubliner, who had been a professional for less than a year. The final was televised and shown on BBC One's Grandstand programme. Retired English snooker player Joe Davis presented Fagan with the trophy.

Fagan earned £2,000 out of the £7,000 total prize money.

== Main draw ==
Last 24; Best of 9 frames
10	Doug Mountjoy (WAL)	5
Roy Andrewartha (WAL)	2
15	Willie Thorne (ENG)	5
Bernard Bennett (ENG)	4
12	John Dunning (ENG)	5
Maurice Parkin (ENG)	4
9	David Taylor (ENG)	5
David Greaves (ENG)	4
13	John Virgo (ENG)	w/o
John Barrie (ENG)	w/d
16	Jack Karnehm (ENG)	4
Chris Ross (SCO)	5
14	Patsy Fagan (IRL)	5
Jackie Rea (NIR)	1
11	Jim Meadowcroft (ENG)	5
Pat Houlihan (ENG)	4

Last 16; Best of 9 frames
1	John Spencer (ENG)	3
10	(Wales) Doug Mountjoy	5
8	Rex Williams (ENG)	4
15	(England) Willie Thorne	5
5	John Pulman (ENG)	w/d
12	(England) John Dunning	w/o
4	Alex Higgins (NIR)	5
9	(England) David Taylor	4
3	Dennis Taylor (NIR)	2
13	(England) John Virgo	5
6	Graham Miles (ENG)	5
(Scotland) Chris Ross	1
7	Fred Davis (ENG)	0
14	(Republic of Ireland) Patsy Fagan	5
2	Ray Reardon (WAL)	4
11	(England) Jim Meadowcroft	5

Quarter-finals; Best of 9 frames
10	(Wales) Doug Mountjoy	5
15	(England) Willie Thorne	4
12	(England) John Dunning	0
4	(Northern Ireland) Alex Higgins	5
13	(England) John Virgo	5
6	(England) Graham Miles	2
14	(Republic of Ireland) Patsy Fagan	5
11	(England) Jim Meadowcroft	4

Semi-finals; Best of 17 frames
10	(Wales) Doug Mountjoy	9
4	(Northern Ireland) Alex Higgins	2
13	(England) John Virgo	8
14	(Republic of Ireland) Patsy Fagan	9

Final; Best of 23 frames
10	(Wales) Doug Mountjoy	9
14	(Republic of Ireland) Patsy Fagan	12

== Final ==
Final: Best of 23 frames. Referee: John Williams; Tower Circus, Blackpool, England, 2 and 3 December 1977.
Patsy Fagan; Ireland	12–9	Doug Mountjoy; Wales
First session: 57–21, 34–81, 48–47, 48–57, 40–68, 45–13, 68–31 (53), 64–57; Second session: 64–43 (57), 48–73, 52–79 (Fagan 52, Mountjoy 51), 38–73, 41–70, 98–0 (68), 58–57; Third session: 37–87, 34–72, 75–16 (53), 73–55 (52), 47–39, 80–28 (63)
68	Highest break	51
0	Century breaks	0
7	50+ breaks	1

== Century breaks ==
- 129 – Alex Higgins
