= 1978 World Snooker Championship =

1978 Embassy World Snooker Championship
Tournament information
- Dates: 17–29 April 1978
- Venue: Crucible Theatre
- City: Sheffield
- Country: England
- Organisation: WPBSA
- Format: Ranking event
- Total prize fund: £24,000
- Winner's share: £7,500
- Highest break: John Spencer (ENG) (138)

Final
- Champion: Ray Reardon (WAL)
- Runner-up: Perrie Mans (RSA)
- Score: 25–18

The 1978 World Snooker Championship (officially known as the 1978 Embassy World Snooker Championship) was a professional ranking snooker tournament that took place between 17 and 29 April 1978 at the Crucible Theatre in Sheffield, England, the second consecutive year the tournament had been held at the venue. A qualifying competition was held at Romiley Forum, Stockport, from 27 March to 7 April. The tournament was promoted by Mike Watterson on behalf of the World Professional Billiards and Snooker Association. It had a total prize fund of £24,000, of which £7,500 went to the champion.

John Spencer was the defending champion, having won the 1977 event by defeating Cliff Thorburn 25–21 in the final. Spencer lost 8–13 in the first round to Perrie Mans. The final was contested by Mans and Ray Reardon. Reardon led 5–2 after the first session, before Mans levelled the match at 8–8 after the first day's play. After the third interval Reardon led 12–11 and won the 24th frame with a 64 break to lead 13–11. After the second day, Reardon led 18–14, and eventually won the match 25–18 to secure his sixth and last world title. Aged 45 years and 203 days, Reardon became the oldest world champion in the sport's history, a record that stood for 44 years until Ronnie O'Sullivan won his seventh world title at the 2022 event, aged 46 years and 148 days. The tournament was sponsored by cigarette company Embassy. It was the first snooker world championship tournament to be broadcast in depth by the BBC.

== Background ==
The cue sport of snooker was founded in the late 19th century by British Army soldiers stationed in India. Joe Davis won the first World Championship in 1927, hosted by the Billiards Association and Control Council, the final match being held at Camkin's Hall in Birmingham, England. Since 1977, the event has been held at the Crucible Theatre in Sheffield, England' The sport's popularity in the United Kingdom grew after this.

The 1978 championship featured sixteen professional players competing in one-on-one snooker matches in a single-elimination format, each match played over several frames. These competitors in the main tournament were selected using a combination of the top players in the snooker world rankings and the winners of a pre-tournament qualification stage. The tournament was promoted by Mike Watterson on behalf of the World Professional Billiards and Snooker Association. It was sponsored by cigarette brand Embassy for the third consecutive year. It was the first championship to have daily BBC coverage throughout the main event.

=== Format ===
The 1978 World Snooker Championship main tournament took place between 17 and 20 April 1978 at the Crucible Theatre. The top eight players from that season's world rankings, calculated from performances at the championship in the previous three years, were seeded into the first round, where they each faced an opponent from the qualifying competition, which was held across two rounds at Romiley Forum, Stockport, from 27 March to 7 April. It was the second time that the event was staged at the Crucible, which as of 2023 has remained the venue for the annual tournament.

Defending champion John Spencer, who had defeated Cliff Thorburn 25–21 in the 1977 final, was the top seed, and top-ranked Ray Reardon was the second seed.

=== Prize fund ===
The breakdown of prize money for this year is shown below:

- Winner: £7,500
- Runner-up: £3,500
- Third place: £2,500
- Fourth place: £2,000
- Quarter-final: £1,000
- Last 16: £500
- Highest break: £500
- Maximum break: £10,000
- Total: £24,000

== Tournament summary ==
=== Qualifying ===
The qualifying competition was held across two rounds at Romiley Forum, Stockport, from 27 March to 7 April. Matches were played as the best of 17 frames, across two sessions. In the preliminary round, Maurice Parkin defeated Bernard Bennett 9–4, in a match where the highest break was just 31. The report in Snooker Scene magazine concluded that "the standard of play was not really appropriate to a world championship". Jack Karnehm was whitewashed 9–0 by Roy Andrewartha. It was the third time that Karnehm had entered the championship, and each time he failed to win a frame. He did not enter again. David Greaves was 12 minutes late to his match against John Barrie, and so, for the first time in the tournament's history, a frame was awarded to a player because of their opponent's late arrival. Barrie had not played in the championship since 1955; he had last won a championship match in 1951. Barrie won 9–3. Pat Houlihan, who had defeated both Reardon and Spencer to win the 1965 English Amateur Championship, took an 8–0 lead against Chris Ross, and won 9–1.

In the qualifying round, Doug Mountjoy defeated Andrewartha 9–3 after losing the opening two frames. In the other qualifying matches, Houlihan won 9–7 against Jim Meadowcroft, Patsy Fagan eliminated John Dunning 9–5, Willie Thorne defeated Rex Williams 9–3, Parkin lost 2–9 to Bill Werbeniuk, and David Taylor won 9–7 against Paddy Morgan

=== First round ===
The first round took place from 17 to 21 April, each match played over three sessions as the best of 25 frames. Defending champion Spencer became the first player to experience the so-called "Crucible curse", a superstition that says every first-time world champion at the Crucible will fail to retain the title the following year. He lost 8–13 to Perrie Mans in the first round, despite making breaks of 138 and 118. David Taylor won the first three frames against Graham Miles. The pair were level at 8–8 before Miles went on to win 13–10. Fagan was 10–12 behind Alex Higgins but won three close frames – on a re-spotted black, then the final black ball and, in the deciding frame, on the final pink ball – to complete a 13–12 victory.

The first session between Fred Davis and Dennis Taylor saw them each win four frames; in the second session Davis moved into an 11–6 lead, and he eventually won 13–9. Thorne missed at an attempt to pot the black ball when leading Eddie Charlton 12–9, and lost the match 12–13. Houlihan made his only appearance in the World Championship at the Crucible, aged 48. He lost 8–13 to Thorburn, who later described him as "a smooth player ... I had to be very careful against Patsy because if the balls were open he could get to you. A very dangerous player." Reardon trailed Mountjoy 2–7, but went on to win 13–9. Werbeniuk defeated John Pulman 13–4.

=== Quarter-finals ===
The quarter-finals took place from 20 to 22 April, each match played over three sessions as the best of 25 frames. Mans took a lead of 9–7 into the last session against Miles, and went on to win 13–7. Davis made a 105 break in the fifth frame, and held a one-frame lead after the nine frames of their first session. Fagan levelled at 7–7 with a break of 105 in the 14th frame, and the pair were again tied at 8–8. Davis took the first three frames of the concluding session for 11–8, and secured his passage into the semi-finals at 13–10.

Charlton won five successive frames to recover from 8–12 and win 13–12 against Thorburn. He compiled a 108 break in the 16th frame. Reardon's four frame advantage in the initial session was maintained during the second session as he went from 6–2 to 10–6. In the third session he won three successive frames, to defeat Werbeniuk 13–6, and compiled a break of 119 in the 18th frame.

=== Semi-finals ===
The semi-finals took place from 23 to 26 April, both matches played over five sessions as the best of 35 frames. Davis became the oldest championship semi-finalist, at the age of 64 years and 251 days. He lost 16–18 to Mans. Davis reflected afterwards that, "If I left him anything at all in the open, no matter how far away, he invariably potted it". Fred's brother Joe Davis, aged 77, who was watching in the audience, was taken ill during the match. According to snooker historian Clive Everton, Joe had been "swinging in his seat this way and that as he mentally played each shot for his brother". Joe collapsed two days later and required surgery; he died several weeks after from a chest infection.

Reardon won four of the seven frames in each of the first two sessions against Charlton. Charlton took six of seven frames in the next session to lead 12–9, but then lost all seven frames in the fourth session. This was the only time in the main tournament that year in which a player won all the frames in a complete session. Reardon said afterwards that "The previous day I'd felt wonderful and couldn't hit a ball. This time I felt tired and listless and played marvellous." Reardon won 18–14. A third-place playoff was over two sessions on 27 and 28 April as the best of 13 frames. Charlton won 7–3 against Davis.

=== Final ===
The final took place from 27 to 29 April, played over six sessions as the best of 49 frames, with John Williams as referee. Reardon and Mans were level at 2–2 but Reardon finished the first session 5–2 ahead. Mans levelled by taking the first three frames of the second session; Reardon later led 7–5, but the session finished with the score at 8–8. During the third session, they were level again at 10–10; the session finished with Reardon one frame ahead at 12–11. He increased his advantage by taking the first three frames in the next session. Sports historian Ian Morrison later wrote that at 15–11, "for the first time since the opening session, the scoreboard reflected the true difference between the two players." With each player winning three of the next six frames, Reardon was still four frames up, at 18–14. On the third day, Mans narrowed the gap to a single frame, but a 100 break by Reardon in the 36th frame doubled that deficit, and the session finished with Reardon four frames in front again, at 22–18. In the concluding session, Reardon made an 81 break in winning the opening frame, and added the next two frames to secure victory at 25–18.

Reardon became the oldest ever World Champion at the age of 45 years and 203 days, a record that lasted until 2022 when Ronnie O'Sullivan won the title aged 46 years and 148 days. It was Reardon's sixth and last world championship title. In a post-match interview, Reardon stated that he felt he had "played well throughout", and praised Mans's ability to pot balls, commenting that "He makes shots that I would not even dream of attempting." Mans said that "I felt good when I won the first three frames. But then Ray made a century. He found his rhythm and I just couldn't do anything about it."

John Hennessy of The Times felt that the pair were generally evenly matched, but "temperament, allied to superlative technique, seemed always on Reardon's side. Whereas Mans seemed in just too much of a hurry between strokes Reardon took a measured tread round the table, gathering his thoughts and concentration on the way." He speculated that Mans had lost his nerve towards the end of the match, as shown in him playing more safety shots and attempting fewer of the audacious pots that he had been playing throughout the tournament. Television critic Clive James, television critic for The Observer, praised how Reardon "embodies in its highest form snooker's heady combination of requirements: he has uncanny physical skill and a subtle mind to go with it."

During the final, Peter Fiddick of The Guardian commented on how "this nation has been taking an extraordinary interest ... in snooker", and how the players were "very conscious of their new audience and its implications." A few days later, in the same newspaper, Frank Keating wrote that "snooker finally managed its coming out party at the grand old age of 103." Hennessy felt that the substitution of snooker in place of the scheduled coverage of horse racing in the BBC's Grandstand was "a remarkable testimony to the grip that the world professional championship took on the British public during the preceding fortnight." He predicted that "One way and another the game is not likely to be the same again." Everton, who made his BBC commentary debut for the match between Charlton and Thorne, suggested in 1993 that the BBC's decision to screen daily coverage of the tournament was "the single most influential decision ever made in the history of snooker, broadening its commercial horizons forever."

== Main draw ==
Numbers in parentheses indicate seedings. Players in bold are match winners.

**Last 16**; Best of 25 frames
18, 19 & 20 April
John Spencer (ENG) (1) | 8
**Perrie Mans (RSA)** | **13**
19 & 20 April
**Graham Miles (ENG) (8)** | **13**
David Taylor (ENG) | 10
18 & 19 April
Alex Higgins (NIR) (5) | 12
**Patsy Fagan (IRL)** | **13**
20 & 21 April
Dennis Taylor (NIR) (4) | 9
**Fred Davis (ENG)** | **13**
17, 18 & 19 April
**Eddie Charlton (AUS) (3)** | **13**
Willie Thorne (ENG) | 12
17 & 18 April
**Cliff Thorburn (CAN) (6)** | **13**
Pat Houlihan (ENG) | 8
17, 18 & 19 April
John Pulman (ENG) (7) | 4
**Bill Werbeniuk (CAN)** | **13**
17 & 18 April
**Ray Reardon (WAL) (2)** | **13**
Doug Mountjoy (WAL) | 9

**Quarter-finals**; Best of 25 frames
21 & 22 April
(South Africa) **Perrie Mans** | **13**
(England) Graham Miles (8) | 7
21 & 22 April
(Republic of Ireland) Patsy Fagan | 10
(England) **Fred Davis** | **13**
20, 21 & 22 April
(Australia) **Eddie Charlton (3)** | **13**
(Canada) Cliff Thorburn (6) | 12
21 & 22 April
(Canada) Bill Werbeniuk | 6
(Wales) **Ray Reardon (2)** | **13**

**Semi-finals**; Best of 35 frames
24, 25 & 26 April
(South Africa) **Perrie Mans** | **18**
(England) Fred Davis | 16
23, 24 & 25 April
(Australia) Eddie Charlton (3) | 14
(Wales) **Ray Reardon (2)** | **18**

**Final**; Best of 49 frames
27, 28 & 29 April
(South Africa) Perrie Mans | 18
(Wales) **Ray Reardon (2)** | **25**
**Third place** Best of 13 frames
27 & 28 April
(England) Fred Davis | 3
(Australia) **Eddie Charlton (3)** | **7**

== Qualifying ==
The results of the qualifying competition are shown below. Winning players are denoted in bold.

Preliminary round (Best of 17 frames)Venue: Romiley Forum, Stockport
| Player | Score | Player |
|---|---|---|
| **Maurice Parkin (ENG)** | **9**–4 | Bernard Bennett (ENG) |
| **Roy Andrewartha (WAL)** | **9**–0 | Jack Karnehm (ENG) |
| **John Barrie (ENG)** | **9**–3 | David Greaves (ENG) |
| **Pat Houlihan (ENG)** | **9**–1 | Chris Ross (SCO) |

Qualifying round (Best of 17 frames)Venue: Romiley Forum, Stockport
| Player | Score | Player |
|---|---|---|
| Doug Mountjoy (WAL) | **9**–3 | Roy Andrewartha (WAL) |
| Patsy Fagan (IRL) | **9**–5 | John Dunning (ENG) |
| Willie Thorne (ENG) | **9**–3 | Rex Williams (ENG) |
| Bill Werbeniuk (CAN) | **9**–2 | Maurice Parkin (ENG) |
| Perrie Mans (RSA) | **9**–6 | John Barrie (ENG) |
| David Taylor (ENG) | **9**–7 | Paddy Morgan (AUS) |
| Pat Houlihan (ENG) | **9**–6 | Jim Meadowcroft (ENG) |
| Fred Davis (ENG) | **9**–8 | John Virgo (ENG) |

== Century breaks ==
There were seven century breaks at the championship, the highest being 138 by John Spencer.

- 138, 118 – John Spencer
- 119, 100 – Ray Reardon
- 108 – Eddie Charlton
- 105 – Fred Davis
- 105 – Patsy Fagan
