= 1977 World Snooker Championship =

Professional snooker tournament

1977 Embassy World Snooker Championship
Tournament information
- Dates: 18–30 April 1977
- Venue: Crucible Theatre
- City: Sheffield
- Country: England
- Organisation: WPBSA
- Format: Ranking event
- Total prize fund: £17,000
- Winner's share: £6,000
- Highest break: John Spencer (ENG) (135)

Final
- Champion: John Spencer (ENG)
- Runner-up: Cliff Thorburn (CAN)
- Score: 25–21

The 1977 World Snooker Championship (officially known as the 1977 Embassy World Snooker Championship) was a professional snooker tournament that took place from 18 to 30 April 1977 at the Crucible Theatre in Sheffield, England. It was the first time that the World Snooker Championship was held at the Crucible, which has hosted it annually ever since, becoming known as the "spiritual home of snooker". The tournament featured 16 competitors, the top eight players from the 1976–77 snooker world rankings and another eight players who came through a qualifying competition held from 28 March to 7 April 1977 at Hounslow Civic Centre and Fisher's Snooker Centre, Acton. Sponsored by cigarette manufacturer Embassy, the tournament was the only ranking event of the 1976–77 snooker season.

The defending champion was Ray Reardon, who had won the championship every year from 1973 to 1976, but he lost by 6 frames to 13 against John Spencer in the quarter-finals. Spencer, who had previously won the tournament in 1969 and 1971, claimed the third and last world title of his career by defeating Cliff Thorburn 25–21 in the final. Spencer became the first player to win the championship using a two-piece cue. As champion, he received £6,000 (equivalent to £35,252 in 2025) from the prize fund of £17,000. The championship produced six century breaks, the highest of which was a 135 by Spencer in the sixth frame of his semi-final match against John Pulman.

The tournament was considered a success by contemporaries, selling more than 20,000 tickets across its thirteen days at the 980-seat Crucible and producing a financial surplus. Commentators credited the venue and Mike Watterson's promotion with putting the championship on a stable footing for the future. Later economic-impact assessments estimated the tournament's annual benefit to Sheffield's local economy at £2.6–4.5 million.

== Overview ==
The inaugural 1927 World Snooker Championship, then known as the Professional Championship of Snooker, took place at various venues in England between November 1926 and May 1927. After a post-war decline and being contested on a challenge basis during the 1960s, the World Snooker Championship reverted to an annual knockout tournament for the 1969 edition.

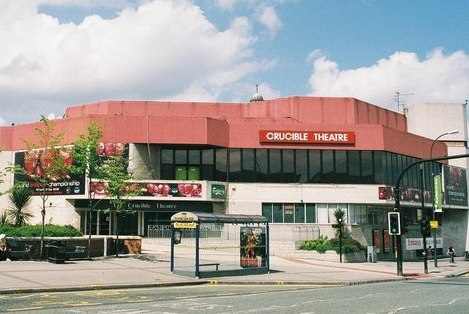
The Crucible Theatre in 2005

In the 1977 championship, 16 professional players competed in one-on-one snooker matches in a single-elimination format, each match being played over several frames. Ray Reardon was the defending champion, having defeated Alex Higgins 27–16 in the final of the 1976 World Snooker Championship. The top-eight players in the 1976–77 snooker world rankings were exempted to the main tournament, where they each faced a player from a qualifying competition. The championship was organised by the governing body for professional snooker, the World Professional Billiards and Snooker Association (WPBSA), and promoted by Mike Watterson, with sponsorship by cigarette brand Embassy.

Watterson had business interests in the motor trade and recycling business, and since 1972 had also promoted snooker exhibition matches involving Higgins, Reardon, and, most often, Fred Davis and John Pulman. Pulman was staying with Watterson in August 1976 when he mentioned that the WPBSA had no sponsor, venue, promoter or television deal for the 1977 World Championship. Watterson, despite not having a venue or sponsor lined up, made an offer to the WPBSA to promote the championship, which he personally underwrote. The WPBSA accepted his bid in November 1976. Watterson chose the Crucible as the venue after his wife Carol saw a play there and recommended it, and he booked the venue at a cost of £6,600. After arranging the dates of television coverage with the BBC, in February 1977 Watterson persuaded Peter Dyke of 1976 championship sponsors W.D. & H.O. Wills to sponsor the 1977 edition under its Embassy cigarette brand; Embassy were hesitant to repeat their sponsorship because they had experienced problems dealing with the previous promoter and were not familiar with Watterson.

Audience ticket prices ranged from £0.75 (equivalent to £3 in 2025) to £3.50. Highlights of the semi-finals and final were broadcast on the national television channel BBC2. There were three sessions of play scheduled each day except for 25, 27 and 30 April when there were two sessions. Up to the quarter-finals, there was play on two snooker tables concurrently. Two Karnehm & Hillman Windsor Royal snooker tables were installed in the arena; a freestanding wooden partition was used to divide the arena into two match areas.

=== Prize fund ===
The breakdown of prize money for 1977 was:

- Winner: £6,000
- Runner-up: £2,000
- Semi-final: £1,200
- Quarter-final: £750
- Last 16: £350
- Highest break: £500
- Total: £17,000

== Tournament summary ==
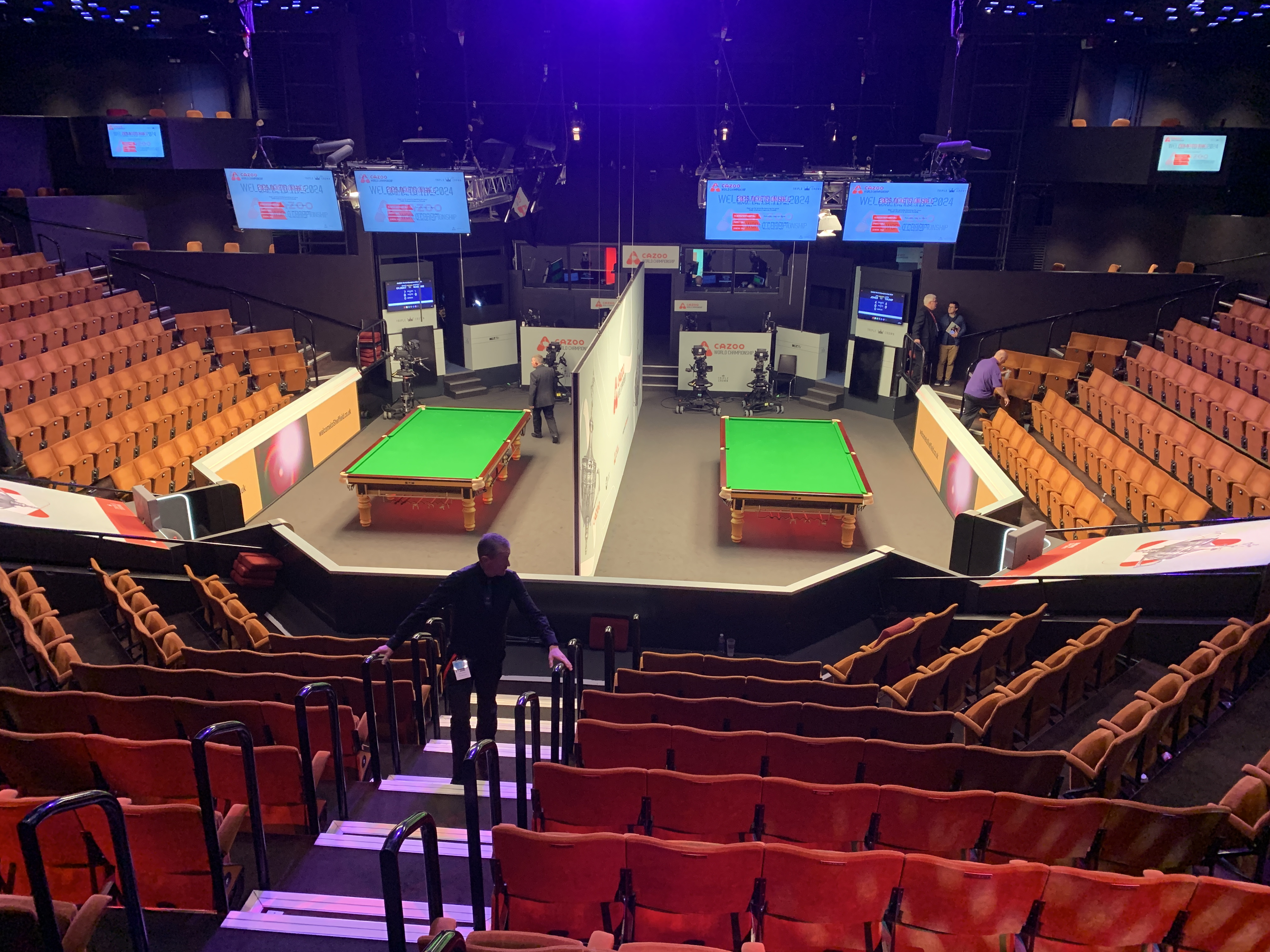
The Crucible Theatre (pictured during the 2024 World Snooker Championship) has been the venue for the World Snooker Championship since 1977.

=== Qualifying ===
The WPBSA first published official world rankings for players on the main tour for the 1976–77 season. Players' performances in the previous three World Snooker Championships—1974, 1975, and 1976—contributed to their points totals. These rankings were used for seedings for the tournament. As defending champion, Reardon was seeded first and was also number one on the ranking list. Originally, the top fourteen players were due to be seeded into the last-16 round, but the WPBSA members voted 11–10 to change this so that only the top eight players were exempted to the last-16. The draw for the tournament was conducted by journalist Janice Hale at Albany Hotel, Birmingham. The 1977 World Championship was the only ranking event of the 1976–77 season.

Qualifying matches were scheduled from 28 March to 7 April 1977, and took place at Hounslow Civic Centre and Fisher's Snooker Centre, Acton. In the first round, John Virgo beat Roy Andrewartha 11–1. In the next round, Virgo won four consecutive frames to go from 7–6 against John Dunning to win 11–6. Willie Thorne won six consecutive frames to complete an 11–4 defeat of Bernard Bennett. Jim Meadowcroft gained a 6–3 lead against Patsy Fagan but lost 9–11 after the pair had been level at 8–8. David Taylor defeated David Greaves 11–0 and made a century break in the fourth frame. There were two other 11–0 defeats: by Cliff Thorburn against Chris Ross and by Dennis Taylor against Jack Karnehm. Veteran Jackie Rea was 8–6 and later 9–8 ahead of Masters champion Doug Mountjoy, a first-season professional who was the reigning World Amateur Champion. Mountjoy took three consecutive frames to win the match 11–9. Maurice Parkin withdrew from the tournament due to illness, giving John Pulman a win by default. Fagan and Virgo, both playing in their first professional tournament, qualified to make their World Championship debuts. Mountjoy, in his first season as a professional, also qualified for a Championship debut.

=== First round ===
The first round took place from 18 to 21 April; each match was played over three sessions as the best of 25 frames. Reardon, who had won the championship each year from 1973 to 1976, was the bookmakers' favourite to win the tournament, with odds of 11/4. The 1973 runner-up Eddie Charlton was second-favourite at 7/2, followed by 1969 and 1971 champion John Spencer at 7/1. Reardon and Fagan each won four frames in their first session, before Reardon opened a 10–7 lead during the second session and won the match 13–7 the following day. Spencer was three frames behind Virgo at 1–4 and 4–7 but won three successive frames to equalise both times, and won the match 13–9. Virgo later wrote that when he was leading 4–1 and had asked the refreee to clean the cue ball, the cue ball had been replaced wrongly, making Virgo's planned attempt at a pot impossible. Having lost that frame, Virgo added, he was "unable to shake off my sense of injustice, lost the next two after that." Despite losing, Virgo was satisfied with his own standard of play during the match. Graham Miles was one frame in front of Thorne at 4–3 after their first session, and from 5–4 ahead, Miles won eight consecutive frames to win the match. Pulman led his fellow former world champion Fred Davis 5–3, and then 11–6, winning 13–12. Davis later wrote that he felt "unaccountably out of touch", while Pulman "played better than I had seen for about five years".

Charlton won seven of the first eight frames against David Taylor, made a 105 break in the 12th frame and progressed to the next round with a 13–5 win. Thorburn won seven successive frames during his 13–6 defeat of Rex Williams. Dennis Taylor concluded a 13–11 win against Perrie Mans with a break of 76, the highest of their match, in the 24th frame. The second seed Alex Higgins was 9–7 ahead of Mountjoy after two sessions but Mountjoy won the opening frame of their third session with a 102 break, and then four of the following five frames. Higgins won the following two frames and led by 36 points in the deciding frame. Higgins missed an attempt to pot the pink ball, and a break of 31 by Mountjoy immediately afterwards terminated when he failed to double the final black ball. Two visits later, Mountjoy potted the black to win the match.

=== Quarter-finals ===
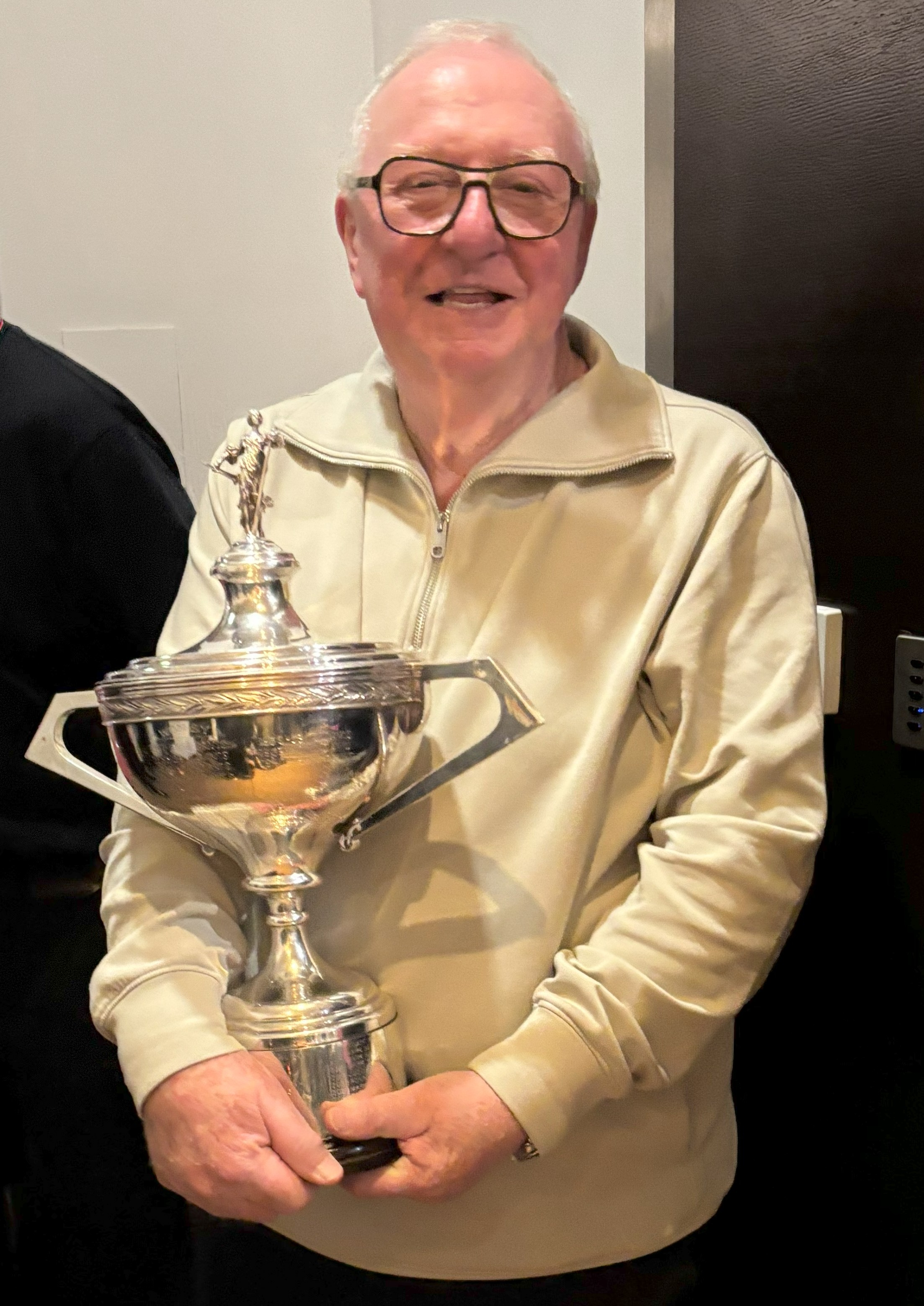
Dennis Taylor, (pictured in 2025 holding the Championship Trophy] reached the semi-finals in 1977.

The quarter-finals were played as best-of-25-frames matches over three sessions on 23 and 24 April. Reardon was never ahead of Spencer, who won the match 13–6. The Snooker Scene match-report assessment said: "Even when the title was slipping away from [Reardon] he never seemed able to focus his concentration and stop making mistakes". Reardon later reflected that although he had been confident of retaining the title going into the tournament, he "was too relaxed and the adrenalin was not flowing" when he played Spencer. Pulman reached the semi-finals for the first time since 1970 by defeating Miles 13–10. The reporter for Snooker Scene said Pulman played "the smooth, attractive snooker of his great days" in the final session.

Thorburn and Charlton were level several times at 3–3, 7–7, 10–10 and 11–11. Charlton won the 23rd frame on the final black but lost the match when Thorburn claimed the next two frames to win the match 13–12. Mountjoy won the first three frames of his match against Dennis Taylor but then lost the next five frames. Each player won four frames in the second session and then Taylor won the opening frame in the third session to lead 10–7. Mountjoy won the next two frames, each on the final black ball, but lost the 20th frame after he went in-off the last black. Taylor won 13–11.

=== Semi-finals ===
The semi-finals took place from 24 to 27 April as best-of-35-frames matches played over five sessions. Pulman took a 3–0 lead but Spencer recovered to 3–3 and compiled a total clearance of 135 in the sixth frame. Pulman then went ahead 7–3 before Spencer levelled the match by winning the next four frames. Spencer went on to lead 13–9 and 16–12, and won 18–16, qualifying for the final for the first time since 1972.

Thorburn led 4–3 after the first session and was level at 7–7 with Taylor after the second session. At the start of the third session, Thorburn made a 100 break, which included a cocked-hat double on the final red ball, and led 12–9 at the close of the penultimate day. Taylor added three frames to his tally at the start of the fourth session to equalise, and four frames later, the pair were again level at 14–14. Four frames into the last session, they were at 16–16. Thorburn made a break of 111 in the 33rd frame, during which the only time he potted the black ball was at the end, then took a lead of 80–0 points in the 34th frame, which ended 98–30, meaning Thorburn qualified for the final for the first time.

=== Final ===
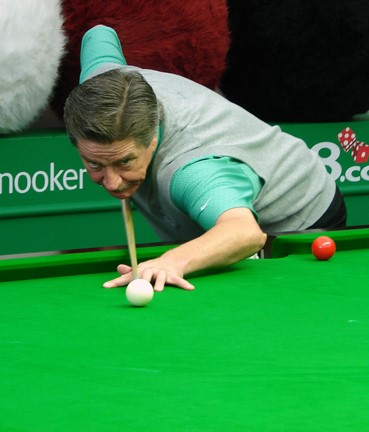
Cliff Thorburn (pictured in 2007) reached the final for the first time, and was runner-up to John Spencer.

The tournament's final between John Spencer and Cliff Thorburn took place from 28 to 30 April as the best of 49 frames. John Smyth was the referee. Spencer won his third world title by defeating Thorburn 25–21. The first session ended with Spencer 4–2 ahead after he won the opening three frames, and he extended his lead to 5–2 before Thorburn won four of the next five frames to leave the score at 6–6. Thorburn took the lead in the match for the first time by winning the first two frames of the evening session. Spencer made a break of 54 to win frame 15, followed by a 97 clearance to draw level at 8–8. After Thorburn won frame 17, Spencer compiled a break of 105 in the 18th frame, meaning that the pair were tied at 9–9 at the conclusion of the first day.

During the fourth session, Thorburn won the last three frames to establish a 13–11 advantage. He added the first two frames of the afternoon session to lead 15–11, but then Spencer won the next three frames. In the final frame of the session, Spencer had a 46-point lead but Thorburn recovered and had a chance to win the frame by potting the final pink; he missed his attempt to pot it, and Spencer won on the final black for 15–15. In the second day's evening session, Thorburn won frame 31 and Spencer won frame 32. Thorburn led by 58–0 in frame 33 but Spencer won it with a clearance of 78. Spencer progressed into an 18–16 lead and led 34–0 in the next frame, which he lost when Thorburn made a break of 75. Thorburn won the next frame as well, meaning that the players were level at 18–18 going into the last day.

Spencer won the first three frames of the third day, and Thorburn won the following two frames. Spencer won the 42nd frame with a break of 67 to lead 22–20 at the end of the penultimate session after Thorburn had missed potting a black off its spot in the last frame of the session; Thorburn commented afterwards that "I should be used to these balls by now but it just refused my mind as I was playing it whether I could hold position for the next red just by running through it or whether I needed a touch of running side". Thorburn narrowed his deficit to one frame at 21–22 but Spencer won the next frame with a break of 43, and the following frame by steadily building a points advantage. In frame 46, a break of 51 gave Spencer a substantial lead and Thorburn conceded the frame and match while there were still two reds left on the table. Spencer claimed his third world title with a 25–21 victory. The trophy was presented to Spencer by John Goodchap, Chief Accountant of Embassy brand owners W.D. & H.O. Wills.

Spencer was the first player to win the title with a two-piece cue. His previous cue was smashed in a car accident just before the 1974 Norwich Union Open; despite repairs, Spencer was not confident about using it so he purchased a new, two-piece implement whilst on tour in Canada. Having made several century breaks with the new cue following his return to England, Spencer decided to use it for the championship only two months before the tournament. A few months after his victory, he replaced it with a different, Japanese-made cue. Snooker historian Clive Everton wrote Spencer "exploded two myths" by winning with a two-piece cue, a type of implement that was generally seen as suitable for pool but not snooker, and having only used it for two months, when most professional players thought it took many months to become proficient with a new cue. Thorburn also used a two-piece cue for the match as was common in his native Canada.

An article in Snooker Scene contrasted Spencer's playing style in his earlier World Championship victories, which featured "aggressive" long potting, to the way he played in 1977, which included fewer long pots and consistent mid-distance potting, and praised his "coolness and steadiness of nerve" and his choice of shots to play. The same magazine described Thorburn's strengths at the tournament as "concentration and consistency". Everton later wrote that Thorburn "admitted that he was psychologically not quite ready to win" a world championship. Thorburn himself commented in his 1987 autobiography, written with Everton, that towards the end of the match "I felt myself slipping ... I don't think it was through nerves but it was all just a bit too much for me." Spencer wrote that he "felt that my determination had carried me through".

== Reception and legacy ==
Having sessions in the morning, at 11 am, was unusual in professional snooker. Virgo later remarked that snooker players were "the sort of people who got up at that time." The crowd was seated closer to the players than at other tournaments, and, according to Taylor, many of the players disliked the two-table setup because of the lack of space. Thorne wrote that "The two-table set-up was very cramped and claustrophobic". Taylor himself liked the venue. He compared the atmosphere to a church, and thought that using the Crucible was "an inspired move." Reardon called the Crucible "fantastic, a proper venue." He added that "All the other venues weren't." In Spencer's 2005 autobiography, he wrote that "the Crucible did more for snooker than any player did." Thorburn also praised the venue for being "perfectly shaped ... I was mesmerised to be there." Joe Davis considered the venue to be "an absolutely perfect setting", and the Billiards and Snooker Control Council referred to the 1977 championship as "in many ways the most successful ever staged."

Over 20,000 audience tickets were sold for matches at the 980-seat Crucible, and the event made a surplus of £12,000. Everton remarked that Watterson had promoted with "an efficiency and flair" unprecedented in snooker and provided "an important foundation" for the championship's future. There was little coverage of the tournament in the national press. As of 2026, the championship has been held at the Crucible each year since 1977, and it is expected to continue there until at least 2045, apart from in 2029 when redevelopment works are scheduled.

Embassy remained as the championship sponsors until 2005, when UK law prevented tobacco companies from sponsoring sporting events. Nick Hunter, executive producer of the BBC TV coverage, persuaded Aubrey Singer, the controller of BBC2, to televise the entire championship from 1978 onwards.

The Crucible Theatre has become known as "the spiritual home of snooker". In 2017, researchers from Sheffield Hallam University's Sport Industry Research Centre estimated that the Championship had benefited Sheffield's economy by £100m over 40 years, and had an annual positive economic benefit of £2.6m. In 2025, Sheffield City Council assessed the economic benefit of the championship to the city as £4.5m a year. Before 1977, the Crucible Theatre had been struggling financially, and Tedd George, son of the Crucible's first artistic director Colin George, later wrote that staging the tournament raised the venue's profile and "secured the theatre's financial stability."

== Main draw ==
The results for the tournament are shown below. The numbers in brackets denote player seedings and match winners are denoted in bold.

**Last 16**; Best of 25 frames
18 & 19 April
**Ray Reardon (WAL) (1)**	**13**
Patsy Fagan (IRL)	7
18 & 19 April
**John Spencer (ENG) (8)**	**13**
John Virgo (ENG)	9
18 & 19 April
**Graham Miles (ENG) (5)**	**13**
Willie Thorne (ENG)	4
18 & 19 April
Fred Davis (ENG) (4)	12
**John Pulman (ENG)**	**13**
20 & 21 April
**Eddie Charlton (AUS) (3)**	**13**
David Taylor (ENG)	5
20 & 21 April
Rex Williams (ENG) (6)	6
**Cliff Thorburn (CAN)**	**13**
20 & 21 April
Perrie Mans (RSA) (7)	11
**Dennis Taylor (NIR)**	**13**
20 & 21 April
Alex Higgins (NIR) (2)	12
**Doug Mountjoy (WAL)**	**13**

**Quarter-finals**; Best of 25 frames
22 & 23 April
Ray Reardon (WAL) (1)	6
**John Spencer (ENG) (8)**	**13**
22 & 23 April
Graham Miles (ENG) (5)	10
**John Pulman (ENG)**	**13**
22 & 23 April
Eddie Charlton (AUS) (3)	12
**Cliff Thorburn (CAN)**	**13**
22 & 23 April
**Dennis Taylor (NIR)**	**13**
Doug Mountjoy (WAL)	11

**Semi-finals**; Best of 35 frames
24, 25, 26 & 27 April
**John Spencer (ENG) (8)**	**18**
John Pulman (ENG)	16
24, 25, 26 & 27 April
**Cliff Thorburn (CAN)**	**18**
Dennis Taylor (NIR)	16

**Final**; Best of 49 frames
28, 29, & 30 April
**John Spencer (ENG) (8)**	**25**
Cliff Thorburn (CAN)	21

=== Final ===
Details for the final are shown below. Numbers in bold and with a ^{†} symbol represent frame-winning scores. Numbers in brackets and italics represent breaks of 50 or more.

Final: Best-of-49 frames. Crucible Theatre, Sheffield. 28–30 April 1977. Referee: John Smyth.
**John Spencer (ENG)**		**25**–21		Cliff Thorburn (CAN)			
First session, 28 April, 11:00 a.m. start
Frame	1	2	3	4	5	6	
Spencer	**63**^{†}	**98**^{†}	**79**^{†}	41	28	**73**^{†}	
Thorburn	49	21	24	**46**^{†}	**94**^{†}	13	
Frames (Spencer first)	1–0	2–0	3–0	3–1	3–2	4–2	
Second session, 28 April, 3:15 p.m. start
Frame	7	8	9	10	11	12	
Spencer	**70**^{†} (68)	39	11	29	**87**^{†} (75)	32	
Thorburn	46	**77**^{†}	**72**^{†}	**64**^{†}	21	**70**^{†}	
Frames (Spencer first)	5–2	5–3	5–4	5–5	6–5	6–6	
Third session, 28 April, 7:30 p.m. start
Frame	13	14	15	16	17	18	
Spencer	41	51	**84**^{†} (54)	**105**^{†} (97)	44	**118**^{†} (105)	
Thorburn	**90**^{†}	**62**^{†}	40	21	**69**^{†}	0	
Frames (Spencer first)	6–7	6–8	7–8	8–8	8–9	9–9	
Fourth session, 29 April, 11:00 a.m. start
Frame	19	20	21	22	23	24	
Spencer	60	**71**^{†}	**73**^{†}	33	53	38	
Thorburn	**71**^{†}	31	45	**85**^{†}	**85**^{†} (58)	**70**^{†}	
Frames (Spencer first)	9–10	10–10	11–10	11–11	11–12	11–13	
Fifth session, 29 April, 3:15 p.m. start
Frame	25	26	27	28	29	30	
Spencer	38	48	**87**^{†}	**90**^{†}	**81**^{†}	**63**^{†}	
Thorburn	**58**^{†}	**77**^{†} (77)	31	40	20	58	
Frames (Spencer first)	11–14	11–15	12–15	13–15	14–15	15–15	
Sixth session, 29 April, 7:30 p.m. start
Frame	31	32	33	34	35	36	
Spencer	29	**59**^{†}	**78**^{†} (78)	**70**^{†}	39	46	
Thorburn	**82**^{†}	26	58	44	**75**^{†} (75)	**85**^{†}	
Frames (Spencer first)	15–16	16–16	17–16	18–16	18–17	18–18	
Seventh session, 30 April, 11:00 a.m. start
Frame	37	38	39	40	41	42	
Spencer	**93**^{†}	**64**^{†}	**74**^{†}	9	36	**107**^{†} (67)	
Thorburn	20	51	21	**83**^{†} (58)	**72**^{†}	20	
Frames (Spencer first)	19–18	20–18	21–18	21–19	21–20	22–20	
Eighth session, 30 April, 2:30 p.m. start
Frame	43	44	45	46	47	48	49
Spencer	17	**83**^{†}	**69**^{†}	**72**^{†} (51)			
Thorburn	**74**^{†}	14	36	12			
Frames (Spencer first)	22–21	23–21	24–21	**25**–21			
105		Highest break		77			
1		Century breaks		0			
7		Other 50+ breaks		4			
**John Spencer won the 1977 World Snooker Championship**

== Qualifying draw ==
Results for the qualifying rounds are shown below. Bold text denotes match winners.

Round 1 (Best of 21 frames)
Player	Score	Player
**John Virgo (ENG)**	**11**–1	Roy Andrewartha (WAL)

Round 2 (Best of 21 frames)
Player	Score	Player
Patsy Fagan (IRL)	**11**–9	Jim Meadowcroft (ENG)
John Virgo (ENG)	**11**–6	John Dunning (ENG)
Willie Thorne (ENG)	**11**–4	Bernard Bennett (ENG)
John Pulman (ENG)	**w/o**–w/d	Maurice Parkin (ENG)
David Taylor (ENG)	**11**–0	David Greaves (ENG)
Cliff Thorburn (CAN)	**11**–0	Chris Ross (SCO)
Dennis Taylor (NIR)	**11**–0	Jack Karnehm (ENG)
Doug Mountjoy (WAL)	**11**–9	Jackie Rea (NIR)

== Century breaks ==
There were six century breaks at the championship. The highest break of the tournament was 135, which was made by John Spencer.

- 135, 105 – John Spencer
- 111, 100 – Cliff Thorburn
- 105 – Eddie Charlton
- 102 – Doug Mountjoy
