= Snooker Scene =

Cue sports magazine

- Editor: Marcus Stead
- Former editors: Clive Everton; Nick Metcalfe
- Publisher: Curtis Sport
- Founder: Clive Everton
- Founded: 1972
- Country: United Kingdom
- Based in: Aldridge
- Language: English

Snooker Scene is a monthly magazine about snooker and other cue sports. It was established by Clive Everton in 1972 from the amalgamation of the Billiards and Snooker Control Council's Billiards and Snooker and his own World Snooker. Everton was editor until he retired in September 2022; the following month, it was announced that the magazine would be returning under new owners, Curtis Sport.

== History ==
Everton had been the editor of Billiards and Snooker from the December 1966 issue until the February 1971 issue when he was succeeded by Doug Organ. According to Everton, he was sacked at the instigation of Jack Karnehm, the chairman of the Billiards and Snooker Control Council (as the Billiards Association and Control Council had renamed itself) for "giving professionals publicity" by including picture of four professional players on the cover of Billiards and Snooker at a time when the Billiards and Snooker Control Council and the professional players were in dispute over the World Billiards Championship. This dispute led to the Professional Billiards Players Association renaming itself as the World Professional Billiards and Snooker Association (WPBSA) and splitting from the Billiards and Snooker Control Council (B&SCC). Following his sacking, Everton established his own magazine, World Snooker, which printed and sold 3,000 copies of its first issue published in January 1971.

In 1972, the B&SCC approached Everton to take over Billiards and Snooker and paid him £1,000 to do so. Everton merged Billiards and Snooker and World Snooker into Snooker Scene, which published its first issue in April 1972, priced at 12p and featuring a report on the 1972 World Snooker Championship.

The magazine has sometimes featured criticisms of the WPBSA which have led to legal disputes.

Snooker Scene was originally published by Everton's News Agency before being published by Snooker Scene Ltd. The magazine purchased and absorbed two other periodicals. Cue World was acquired in 1989, and Pot Black was purchased from the WPBSA in 1999. Janice Hale who joined Everton's News Agency in 1972 served as assistant editor, before leaving in 1992. Later, under Everton's editorship, the deputy editor was David Hendon, and the chief reporter was Phil Yates, and additional reporting was provided by Marcus Stead. The magazine was based at Halesowen for 14 years before moving to Stourbridge in late 2020.

Everton has said of Snooker Scene: "I had started this as a simple journal of record of what was happening on the table, but it became a crusading vehicle … Taking Wisden and Private Eye as our models we sometimes made our point through hard reporting, sometimes through satire."

In the September 2022 issue of Snooker Scene, Everton announced that he would not be continuing as editor. In October 2022 it was announced that the magazine would be returning under new owners, Curtis Sport, and with a new editor, Nick Metcalfe. Metcalfe brought a number of writers into the team, including Phil Haigh, Michael McMullan and Annette Lord. Following editorial disagreements with Everton, who retained legal ownership of the magazine, Metcalfe was removed as editor in December 2022. Long-time contributor Marcus Stead was appointed as acting editor, and he took on the role on a permanent basis from January 2023. The other current writers are Phil Yates, Annette Lord, Jonathan Davies, Stuart Pike and James Lodge. Clive Everton continued to work for the magazine as Editorial Consultant until shortly before his death in October 2024. He also continued to cover billiards and wrote occasional features.
