= 1984–85 snooker season =

Details
- Duration: July 1984 – 18 May 1985
- Tournaments: 27 (6 ranking events)

Triple Crown winners
- UK Championship: (England) Steve Davis
- Masters: (Canada) Cliff Thorburn
- World Championship: (Northern Ireland) Dennis Taylor

The 1984–85 snooker season was a series of snooker tournaments played between July 1984 and May 1985. The following table outlines the results for the ranking and the invitational events.

== New professional players ==
The World Professional Billiards and Snooker Association (WPBSA) accepted the following players as professionals. Lou Condo was readmitted after having allowed his WPBSA membership to lapse. Tony Drago was also accepted, but he informed the Association that he had not wanted his application to be progressed and so was not included. Thirteen players had their applications rejected, including Terry Whitthread, Joe O'Boye, Steve Meakin, Barry West, and Dave Gilbert.

- Roger Bales (ENG)
- Malcolm Bradley (ENG)
- Dave Chalmers (ENG)
- Tony Chappel (WAL)
- Lou Condo (AUS)
- Robby Foldvari (AUS)
- Danny Fowler (ENG)
- Peter Francisco (RSA)
- Wayne Jones (WAL)
- Tony Kearney (IRL)
- Steve Longworth (ENG)
- Jack McLaughlin (NIR)
- Steve Newbury (WAL)
- Dene O'Kane (NZL)
- John Rea (SCO)

== Calendar ==
Date (Note: Dates use the mm-dd date format.)			Rank	Tournament name	Venue	City	Winner	Runner-up	Score	Refs
06–25	07–08	AUS	NR	Australian Masters	Parmatta Club	Sydney	(England) Tony Knowles	(England) John Virgo	7–3	
07–11	07–13	NZL	NR	New Zealand Masters	Kingsgate Convention Centre	Auckland	(England) Jimmy White	(Canada) Kirk Stevens	5–3	
08-??	08-??	CAN	NR	Canadian Professional Championship	Brass Cannon Club	Toronto	(Canada) Cliff Thorburn	(Canada) Mario Morra	9–2	
08–13	08–17	AUS	NR	Australian Professional Championship	RSL Club	Dubbo	(Australia) Eddie Charlton	(Australia) Warren King	10–3	
08–21	08–22	SGP	NR	Singapore Masters	Mandarin Stadium	Singapore	(Wales) Terry Griffiths	(England) Steve Davis	(Note: No play-off was held and the title was decided on league table only.)	
08–20	08–23	ESP	NR	Costa Del Sol Classic	Las Palmeras Hotel	Fuengirola	(Northern Ireland) Dennis Taylor	(England) Mike Hallett	5–2	
08–28	08–29	MYS	NR	Malaysian Masters	Selangor Club	Kuala Lumpur	(Wales) Terry Griffiths	(England) Tony Meo		
08–30	08–31	THA	NR	Thailand Masters	Ambassador Hotel	Bangkok	(England) Jimmy White	(Wales) Terry Griffiths	4–3	
09-05	09-08	HKG	NR	Hong Kong Masters	Queen Elisabeth Stadium	Hong Kong	(England) Steve Davis	(Wales) Doug Mountjoy	4–2	
09–14	09–16	IRL	NR	Carlsberg Challenge	RTÉ Studios	Dublin	(England) Jimmy White	(England) Tony Knowles	9–7	
09–20	09–23	SCO	NR	Scottish Masters	Hospitality Inn	Glasgow	(England) Steve Davis	(England) Jimmy White	9–4	
09–24	10–07	ENG	WR	International Open	Eldon Square Recreation Centre	Newcastle	(England) Steve Davis	(England) Tony Knowles	9–2	
10–20	10–28	ENG	WR	Grand Prix	Hexagon Theatre	Reading	(Northern Ireland) Dennis Taylor	(Canada) Cliff Thorburn	10–2	
11–18	12–02	ENG	WR	UK Championship	Guild Hall	Preston	(England) Steve Davis	(Northern Ireland) Alex Higgins	16–8	
12–05	12–16	ENG	TE	World Doubles Championship	Derngate Centre	Northampton	(Northern Ireland) Alex Higgins (England) Jimmy White	(Canada) Cliff Thorburn (England) Willie Thorne	10–2	
??-??	??-??	RSA	NR	South African Professional Championship	MOTHS Club	Johannesburg	(South Africa) Jimmy van Rensberg	(South Africa) Perrie Mans	10–7	
12-??	12-??	ENG	NR	Pot Black	BBC Studios	Birmingham	(Wales) Doug Mountjoy	(England) Jimmy White	2–0	
01–04	01–13	ENG	WR	The Classic	Spectrum Arena	Warrington	(England) Willie Thorne	(Canada) Cliff Thorburn	13–8	
01–27	02–03	ENG	NR	The Masters	Wembley Conference Centre	London	(Canada) Cliff Thorburn	(Wales) Doug Mountjoy	9–6	
02–05	02–10	ENG	NR	English Professional Championship	Corn Exchange	Ipswich	(England) Steve Davis	(England) Tony Knowles	9–2	
02–05	02–10	SCO	NR	Scottish Professional Championship	Marco's Leisure Centre	Edinburgh	(Scotland) Murdo MacLeod	(Scotland) Eddie Sinclair	10–2	
02–17	03-03	ENG	WR	British Open	Assembly Rooms	Derby	(South Africa) Silvino Francisco	(Canada) Kirk Stevens	12–9	
03–20	03–23	ENG	TE	World Cup	Bournemouth International Centre	Bournemouth	All-Ireland	England A	9–7	
03–26	03–31	IRL	NR	Irish Masters	Goff's	Kill	(England) Jimmy White	(Northern Ireland) Alex Higgins	9–5	
04–08	04–11	NIR	NR	Irish Professional Championship	Ulster Hall	Belfast	(Northern Ireland) Dennis Taylor	(Northern Ireland) Alex Higgins	10–5	
04–12	04–28	ENG	WR	World Snooker Championship	Crucible Theatre	Sheffield	(Northern Ireland) Dennis Taylor	(England) Steve Davis	18–17	
05–07	05–11	WAL	NR	Welsh Professional Championship	Abertillery Leisure Centre	Abertillery	(Wales) Terry Griffiths	(Wales) Doug Mountjoy	9–4	
05–11	05–18	WAL	NR	Pontins Professional	Pontins	Prestatyn	(Wales) Terry Griffiths	(England) John Spencer	9–7	

WR = World ranking event
NR = Non-ranking event
TE = Team event

== Official rankings ==
The top 16 of the world rankings, these players automatically played in the final rounds of the world ranking events and were invited for the Masters.

No.	Ch.	Name
1	Steady	(England) Steve Davis
2	▲	(England) Tony Knowles
3	Steady	(Canada) Cliff Thorburn
4	▲	(Canada) Kirk Stevens
5	▼	(Wales) Ray Reardon
6	Steady	(Australia) Eddie Charlton
7	▲	(England) Jimmy White
8	▲	(Wales) Terry Griffiths
9	▼	(Northern Ireland) Alex Higgins
10	▲	(England) Tony Meo
11	▲	(Northern Ireland) Dennis Taylor
12	▲	(England) Willie Thorne
13	▲	(England) John Spencer
14	▼	(Canada) Bill Werbeniuk
15	▼	(Wales) Doug Mountjoy
16	▼	(England) David Taylor
