= 1987 Welsh Professional Championship =

Welsh Professional Championship
Tournament information
- Dates: 9–13 February 1987
- Venue: Newport Centre
- City: Newport
- Country: Wales
- Organisation: WPBSA
- Format: Non-ranking event
- Total prize fund: £20,000
- Winner's share: £8,000
- Highest break: Doug Mountjoy (108)

Final
- Champion: Doug Mountjoy
- Runner-up: Steve Newbury
- Score: 9–7

The 1987 Matchroom Welsh Professional Championship was a professional non-ranking snooker tournament, which took place between 9 and 13 February 1987 at the Newport Centre in Newport, Wales.

Doug Mountjoy won the tournament defeating Steve Newbury 9–7 in the final.

== Prize fund ==
The breakdown of prize money for this year is shown below:

- Winner: £8,000
- Runner-up: £5,000
- Semi-final: £2,000
- Quarter-final: £500
- Highest break: £1,000
- Total: £20,000

== Main draw ==
Last 16; Best of 11 frames
Colin Roscoe	6
Clive Everton	2
Wayne Jones	6
Mark Bennett	3

Quarter-finals; Best of 11 frames
Doug Mountjoy	6
Colin Roscoe	2
Tony Chappel	6
Ray Reardon	4
Steve Newbury	6
Cliff Wilson	2
Terry Griffiths	6
Wayne Jones	2

Semi-finals; Best of 17 frames
Doug Mountjoy	9
Tony Chappel	2
Steve Newbury	9
Terry Griffiths	6

Final; Best of 17 frames
Doug Mountjoy	9
Steve Newbury	7
