= 1990–91 snooker world rankings =

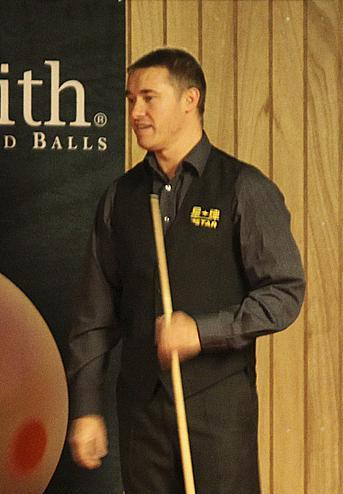
Stephen Hendry (pictured in 2010) topped the rankings for the first time.

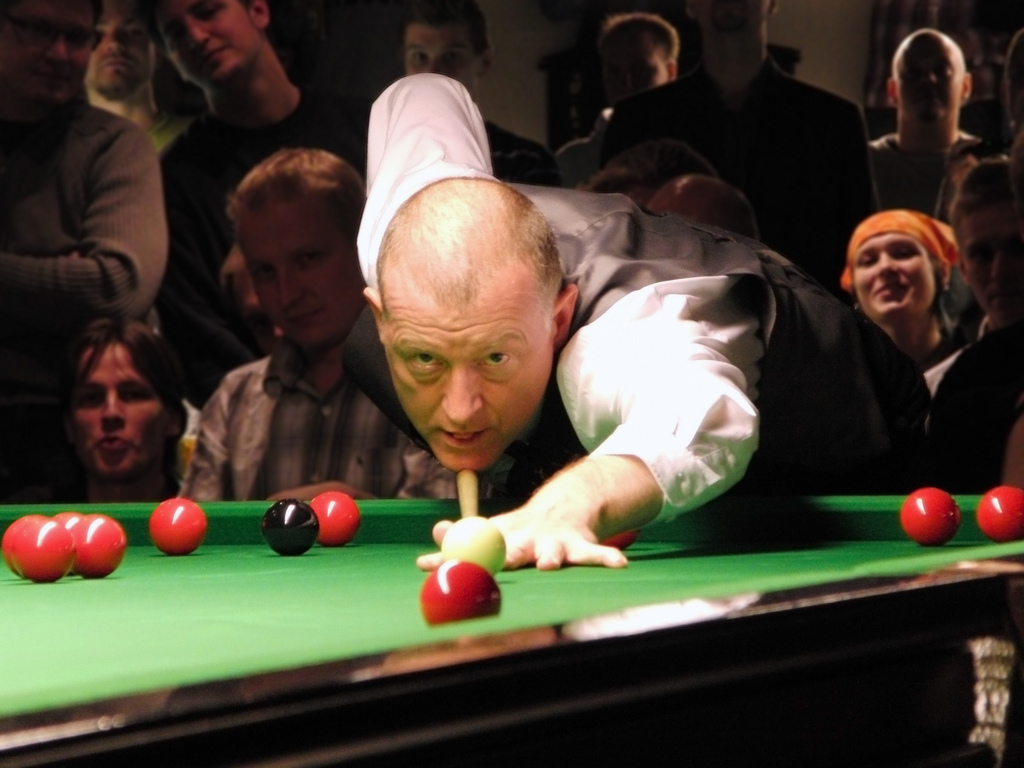
Steve Davis (pictured in 2008), who had been the number-one ranked player for the preceding seven years, was ranked second.

The World Professional Billiards and Snooker Association (WPBSA), the governing body for professional snooker, first introduced a ranking system for professional players in 1976, with the aim of seeding players for the World Snooker Championship. The reigning champion would be automatically seeded first, the losing finalist from the previous year seeded second, and the other seedings based on the ranking list. Initially, the rankings were based on performances in the preceding three world championships. The 1983–84 snooker world rankings were the first to take tournaments other than the world championship into account and several additional tournaments were designated as ranking tournaments over the following years. The list for the 1986–87 snooker season was the first to only take account of results over two seasons and the rankings for 1990–91 were also based on results from the preceding two seasons.

1990 World Snooker Championship winner Stephen Hendry took first place in the 1990–91 ranking list, followed by Steve Davis. Davis, who had held the number one ranking since the 1983–84 list, withdrew from three ranking events held outside of the UK in the 1989–90 season. He commented that he felt that the increase in the number of ranking events was too rapid and said that "I won't jeopardize my form just for the sake of staying at number one. If I lose my number one place, that's the price I have to pay." The other seven players managed by Barry Hearn's Matchroom company also boycotted the 1989 Dubai Classic. Because of this, a number of "non-tournament" players, usually only allowed to play in the World Championship, were given places in the Dubai Classic. John Parrott was placed third, down one place from the previous season, and Jimmy White stayed in fourth. Doug Mountjoy, who had won the 1988 UK Championship and the 1989 Classic to become the only player apart from Davis to win successive ranking titles, rose five places to fifth.

The top 16 in the rankings were exempted from the qualifying rounds for the World Snooker Championship and were included in certain invitational events. Martin Clark, at 12th, joined the top 16 for the first time. Former world number three Neal Foulds gained seven places, to 13th. Alex Higgins was ranked 14th in the original list for the season, having been 24th the year before, but was docked 25 points and banned from competing for ten months in July 1990. These penalties were imposed by the WPBSA following a hearing conducted for the Association by Gavin Lightman, a barrister, which considered several incidents including Higgins punching a press officer, threatening to arrange for fellow player Dennis Taylor to be shot, and insulting both Taylor and WPBSA chairman John Spencer. This meant that Alain Robidoux gained 16th place. Cliff Thorburn, Joe Johnson and Tony Knowles were the three players to drop out of the top 16.

== Points tariff and basis of ranking ==
Points tariff contributing to the Snooker world rankings 1990–91
Placing	1989 and 1990 world championships	Other ranking tournaments 1988–89 and 1990–91
Champion	10	6
Runner-up	8	5
Losing semi-finalist	6	4
Losing quarter-finalist	4	3
Last 16 loser	2	2
Last 32 loser	1 ranking point or 2 merit points (Note: Players who qualified received a ranking point. Players exempted until this round received two merit points.)	1
Final qualifying round loser	2 merit points	1 merit point
Penultimate qualifying round loser	1 merit point	1 A point
Third-from-last qualifying round loser	1 A point	Frames won counted
Preliminary round loser	Frames won counted	–

Ranking was determined as follows:

- By number of ranking points.
- If players had an equal number of ranking points, precedence was given to the player with the better performances in the later season.
- If players were still equal, merit points were considered. If they were still tied, precedence was given to the player with the better performances in the later season.
- If players were still equal, A points were considered. If they were still tied, precedence was given to the player with the better performances in the later season.
- If players were still equal, frames won were considered. If they were still tied, precedence was given the player with the better performances in the later season.

== Rankings ==
Key:

- "(New)" denotes a player that was a new professional for 1989–90.
- "(NT)" denotes a non-tournament player, i.e. a player who was permitted to enter the world championship but no other tournaments in 1990–91.
- "N" denotes that as a non-tournament player, the player was not eligible to enter.
- "–" denotes that the player did not compete in the tournament.
- "X" denotes that the player was banned from competing in the tournament.
- "PL" denotes that the player lost in the professional play-offs.

Snooker world rankings 1990–91
Ranking	Name	1988–89 season								1989–90 season										Ranking points	Merit	A points	Frames
Ranking	Name	IO	GP	CM	UK	Cl	EO	BO	WC	HK	AO	IO	GP	DC	UK	Cl	BO	EO	WC	Ranking points	Merit	A points	Frames
1	Stephen Hendry (SCO)	2	1	4	5	3	2	2	6	3	6	5	2	6	6	1	0	5	10	69	1	0	0
2	Steve Davis (ENG)	6	6	5	4	0	–	3	10	–	–	6	6	–	5	4	2	4	6	67	1	0	0
3	John Parrott (ENG)	0	1	3	3	3	6	4	8	1	0	3	2	4	2	2	0	6	6	54	2	0	0
4	Jimmy White (ENG)	5	3	6	1	0	4	1	4	4	0	3	2	–	3	0	2	2	8	48	2	0	0
5	Doug Mountjoy (WAL)	1	2	2	6	6	2	2	1	2	2	0	3	5	0	0	2	3	2	41	3	0	0
6	Terry Griffiths (WAL)	0	3	3	4	2	5	0	4	1	4	1	0	–	4	0	1	0	4	36	5	0	0
7	Mike Hallett (ENG)	1	2	4	0	0	4	4	4	6	1	1	1	0	3	1	1	0	2	35	4	0	0
8	Dean Reynolds (ENG)	4	1	1	2	1	–	5	4	0	1	0	5	3	2	1	1	1	2	34	2	0	0
9	Steve James (ENG)	4	1	2	1	1	0	0	1	1	1	2	0	2	0	6	4	4	2	32	4	0	0
10	Dennis Taylor (NIR)	3	4	3	2	1	1	0	2	3	0	2	3	–	2	1	2	0	0	29	5	0	0
11	Willie Thorne (ENG)	2	0	1	2	4	2	2	2	2	3	2	1	–	2	0	0	1	2	28	3	0	0
12	Martin Clark (ENG)	0	0	1	1	3	3	3	0	2	3	1	1	2	1	2	3	1	0	27	6	0	0
13	Neal Foulds (ENG)	1	2	0	1	1	0	2	0	3	1	2	1	–	1	0	3	3	4	25	5	0	0
14	John Virgo (ENG)	1	0	2	3	2	2	1	2	2	2	0	1	2	0	2	0	1	2	25	4	0	0
15	Tony Meo (ENG)	3	1	0	0	1	0	6	6	1	1	0	1	–	0	1	1	0	2	24	6	0	0
16	Alain Robidoux (CAN)	1	4	0	0	0	2	1	0	1	0	4	2	1	3	0	2	1	1	23	4	3	0
17	Joe Johnson (ENG)	3	1	1	2	2	2	3	0	0	1	0	3	0	2	0	1	2	0	23	8	0	0
18	Cliff Thorburn (CAN)	X	X	3	3	4	3	2	0	0	0	0	1	–	1	1	0	0	4	22	7	0	0
19	Gary Wilkinson (ENG)	0	1	0	1	0	1	0	1	4	4	0	1	1	4	2	0	0	1	21	4	3	0
20	Steve Newbury (WAL)	2	1	1	0	2	0	0	1	2	0	2	2	0	0	3	3	1	1	21	6	0	0
21	Tony Knowles (ENG)	1	2	0	2	2	0	1	0	0	2	2	3	0	2	0	2	0	2	21	8	0	0
22	Wayne Jones (WAL)	0	1	0	0	5	0	0	2	1	2	1	0	1	1	3	0	1	1	19	6	1	0
23	Dene O'Kane (NZL)	1	1	0	1	1	0	1	1	5	1	0	0	1	1	3	0	1	0	18	7	0	0
24	Peter Francisco (RSA)	0	0	0	1	0	0	3	0	0	2	0	0	3	2	2	2	0	1	16	11	0	0
25	Bob Chaperon (CAN)	2	1	0	0	1	0	0	1	1	0	1	0	0	1	1	6	1	0	16	9	0	0
26	Silvino Francisco (RSA)	1	0	0	1	2	0	0	2	0	3	1	0	0	1	4	0	1	0	16	10	0	0
27	Barry West (ENG)	3	1	0	3	0	0	2	0	1	2	1	0	2	1	0	0	0	0	16	11	0	0
28	Cliff Wilson (WAL)	0	2	2	1	1	1	2	0	1	0	3	0	1	1	0	0	0	1	16	8	0	0
29	Danny Fowler (ENG)	0	0	1	2	0	2	0	0	0	0	0	4	4	0	0	0	1	1	15	10	1	0
30	Tony Drago (MLT)	1	1	0	0	1	0	1	0	0	2	1	0	2	1	2	1	0	1	14	8	0	0
31	Eddie Charlton (AUS)	0	1	1	0	0	3	0	2	1	0	1	0	1	0	1	0	2	1	14	8	0	0
32	James Wattana (THA) (New)	–	–	–	–	–	–	–	–	0	5	1	4	1	0	0	1	0	0	12	3	3	0
33	Mark Bennett (WAL)	0	0	1	2	0	1	0	0	0	0	1	0	0	3	0	1	2	1	12	6	4	0
34	Eugene Hughes (IRL)	1	2	0	0	1	1	1	1	0	1	1	1	0	0	0	2	0	0	12	9	0	0
35	Tony Jones (ENG)	0	0	0	0	0	0	0	0	2	3	2	2	1	1	0	0	0	0	11	8	5	0
36	David Roe (ENG)	0	0	0	2	0	1	1	2	1	1	0	0	2	0	0	0	1	0	11	11	0	0
37	Rex Williams (ENG)	2	3	0	1	0	1	0	0	0	0	0	0	0	1	1	1	1	0	11	12	0	0
38	Nigel Bond (ENG) (New)	–	–	–	–	–	–	–	–	0	0	4	1	2	0	0	0	3	0	10	4	2	0
39	Warren King (AUS)	0	0	2	0	0	0	0	0	0	1	0	1	1	0	5	0	0	0	10	7	6	0
40	Darren Morgan (WAL)	0	0	1	0	0	0	1	1	0	0	0	0	0	0	2	1	0	4	10	5	6	0
41	Steve Duggan (ENG)	1	1	1	1	0	0	0	2	0	2	0	0	0	0	1	1	0	0	10	6	4	0
42	Brian Morgan (ENG) (New)	–	–	–	–	–	–	–	–	1	0	3	0	0	1	3	0	0	0	8	2	1	0
43	Tony Chappel (WAL)	0	0	0	0	2	1	1	0	0	0	0	0	1	0	0	0	2	1	8	8	4	0
44	David Taylor (ENG)	2	0	2	0	2	0	0	0	0	0	0	0	0	0	1	0	1	0	8	11	3	0
45	Les Dodd (ENG)	1	0	0	0	0	0	0	0	2	0	0	1	0	0	0	3	0	0	7	11	2	5
46	Robert Marshall (ENG)	0	0	0	0	0	0	1	0	0	0	2	0	0	0	0	4	0	0	7	5	5	17
47	John Campbell (AUS)	1	0	0	0	0	2	0	0	0	0	0	0	1	0	1	0	2	0	7	6	7	0
48	Colin Roscoe (WAL)	0	0	1	1	0	0	1	0	0	1	0	0	0	0	0	0	3	0	7	4	7	10
49	Jack McLaughlin (NIR)	0	2	0	0	0	0	0	0	0	0	0	0	3	0	1	0	0	0	6	11	4	0
50	Ian Graham (ENG)	0	0	2	0	0	0	0	0	3	1	0	0	0	0	0	0	0	0	6	9	5	10
51	Nigel Gilbert (ENG)	0	3	0	1	0	0	0	0	0	0	0	0	0	0	1	0	0	1	6	8	7	0
52	Jim Wych (CAN)	2	0	0	0	0	3	0	0	0	0	0	0	1	0	0	0	0	0	6	10	3	0
53	Paddy Browne (IRL)	0	0	0	0	3	1	0	1	0	0	0	0	0	0	0	1	0	0	6	7	7	0
54	Brady Gollan (CAN) (New)	–	–	–	–	–	–	–	–	1	1	0	0	0	2	0	0	0	1	5	2	2	6
55	John Spencer (ENG)	2	1	1	0	0	–	0	0	0	0	0	0	1	0	0	0	0	0	5	11	3	0
56	Murdo MacLeod (SCO)	1	0	1	0	0	1	1	0	0	0	0	0	0	0	0	1	0	0	5	8	5	0
57	Steve Longworth (ENG)	1	0	2	0	0	1	1	0	0	0	0	0	0	0	0	0	0	0	5	9	6	0
58	Jim Chambers (ENG)	0	0	0	0	0	1	0	0	1	0	0	1	1	0	0	0	0	0	4	8	6	2
59	Mark Johnston-Allen (ENG)	0	0	0	0	0	1	2	0	0	0	1	0	0	0	0	0	0	0	4	10	6	0
60	Mark Rowing (ENG)	0	0	0	0	0	0	0	0	0	0	0	0	0	0	2	1	0	0	3	5	4	17
61	Craig Edwards (ENG)	0	0	0	0	0	1	0	0	0	0	0	0	0	0	0	0	2	0	3	4	5	16
62	Joe O'Boye (IRL)	0	0	0	1	0	0	0	1	0	0	0	0	0	1	0	0	0	0	3	8	7	0
63	Brian Rowswell (ENG)	0	0	0	0	0	0	0	0	0	0	0	1	1	0	0	0	0	0	2	5	6	14
64	Nick Dyson (ENG) (New)	–	–	–	–	–	–	–	–	0	0	0	0	0	0	0	0	2	0	2	2	4	11
65	Jason Smith (ENG)	0	0	0	0	0	0	0	0	0	0	0	2	0	0	0	0	0	0	2	2	10	18
66	Paul Gibson (ENG)	0	0	0	0	0	0	0	0	0	0	0	2	0	0	0	0	0	0	2	1	4	11
67	Joe Grech (MLT)	0	0	0	0	0	0	0	0	N	N	N	N	2	N	N	N	N	0	2	0	1	0
68	Kirk Stevens (CAN)	0	0	0	1	0	0	0	0	0	0	0	0	0	1	0	0	0	0	2	7	9	0
69	Roger Bales (ENG)	0	0	0	0	0	0	1	0	0	0	1	0	0	0	0	0	0	0	2	4	12	0
70	Tony Wilson (IOM)	0	0	0	0	0	1	0	0	0	0	0	0	0	0	0	1	0	0	2	3	7	23
71	Marcel Gauvreau (CAN)	0	0	1	0	0	0	0	0	1	0	0	0	0	0	0	0	0	0	2	2	13	3
72	Ray Edmonds (ENG)	0	2	0	0	0	0	0	0	0	0	0	0	0	0	0	0	0	0	2	8	9	0
73	Ray Reardon (WAL)	0	0	1	0	1	0	0	0	0	0	0	0	0	0	0	0	0	0	2	5	5	0
74	Dave Gilbert (ENG)	0	0	0	0	0	0	0	0	0	1	0	0	0	0	0	0	0	0	1	9	9	0
75	Tommy Murphy (NIR)	0	0	0	0	0	0	0	0	0	0	0	0	0	0	0	1	0	0	1	9	8	0
76	Mick Price (ENG)	0	0	0	0	0	0	0	0	0	0	0	0	0	0	0	0	1	0	1	8	5	13
77	Bill Oliver (ENG)	0	0	0	0	0	0	0	0	0	1	0	0	0	0	0	0	0	0	1	5	6	26
78	Paul Medati (ENG)	0	0	0	0	0	0	0	0	0	0	0	0	1	0	0	0	0	0	1	4	4	32
79	Martin Smith (ENG)	0	0	0	0	0	0	0	0	0	0	1	0	0	0	0	0	0	0	1	4	8	17
80	Andrew Cairns (ENG) (New)	–	–	–	–	–	–	–	–	0	0	1	0	0	0	0	0	0	0	1	3	3	8
81	Mario Morra (CAN)	0	0	0	0	0	0	0	0	0	0	0	1	0	0	0	0	0	0	1	3	8	13
82	Barry Pinches (ENG) (New)	–	–	–	–	–	–	–	–	1	0	0	0	0	0	0	0	0	0	1	2	4	7
83	Ian Brumby (ENG) (New)	–	–	–	–	–	–	–	–	0	0	0	0	0	0	1	0	0	0	1	2	3	14
84	Jon Wright (ENG)	0	0	0	0	1	0	0	0	0	0	0	0	0	0	0	0	0	0	1	8	7	8
85	John Rea (SCO)	1	0	0	0	0	0	0	0	0	0	0	0	0	0	0	0	0	0	1	7	5	19
86	Nick Terry (ENG)	0	0	0	0	1	0	0	0	0	0	0	0	0	0	0	0	0	0	1	6	7	8
87	Graham Cripsey (ENG)	0	0	0	0	1	0	0	0	0	0	0	0	0	0	0	0	0	0	1	5	12	0
88	George Scott (ENG)	0	0	1	0	0	0	0	0	0	0	0	0	0	0	0	0	0	0	1	1	1	26
89	Anthony Harris (ENG)	0	0	0	0	1	0	0	0	0	0	0	0	0	0	0	0	0	0	1	0	9	37
90	Dave Martin (ENG)	0	0	0	0	0	0	0	0	0	0	0	0	0	0	0	0	0	0	0	10	8	0
91	Steve Campbell (ENG)	0	0	0	0	0	0	0	0	0	0	0	0	0	0	0	0	0	0	0	7	7	22
92	Bob Harris (ENG)	0	0	0	0	0	0	0	0	0	0	0	0	0	0	0	0	0	0	0	6	5	13
93	Eddie Sinclair (SCO)	0	0	0	0	0	0	0	0	0	0	0	0	0	0	0	0	0	0	0	6	5	33
94	Graham Miles (ENG)	0	0	0	0	0	0	0	0	0	0	0	0	0	0	0	0	0	0	0	6	6	18
95	Ken Owers (ENG)	0	0	0	0	0	0	0	0	0	0	0	0	0	0	0	0	0	0	0	6	6	14
96	Pat Houlihan (ENG)	0	0	0	0	0	0	0	0	0	0	0	0	0	0	0	0	0	0	0	5	10	6
97	Alex Higgins (NIR)	0	5	0	1	1	1	1	0	2	1	0	1	3	1	1	5	1	1	0 (Note: Penalised 25 ranking points.)	5	0	0
98	Stephen Murphy (IRE) (New)	–	–	–	–	–	–	–	–	0	0	0	0	0	0	0	0	0	0	0	4	2	12
99	Mick Fisher (ENG)	0	0	0	0	0	0	0	0	0	0	0	0	0	0	0	0	0	0	0	4	14	0
100	Robby Foldvari (AUS)	0	0	0	0	0	0	0	0	0	0	0	0	0	0	0	0	0	0	0	4	5	37
101	Steve Meakin (ENG)	0	0	0	0	0	0	0	0	0	0	0	0	0	0	0	0	0	0	0	3	5	29
102	Paul Watchorn (IRL)	0	0	0	0	0	0	0	0	0	0	0	0	0	0	0	0	0	0	0	2	6	32
103	Ian Williamson (ENG)	0	0	0	0	0	0	0	0	0	0	0	0	0	0	0	0	0	0	0	2	10	22
105	Anthony Kearney (IRL)	0	0	0	0	0	0	0	0	0	0	0	0	0	0	0	0	0	0	0	2	8	19
104	Eric Lawlor (ENG)	0	0	0	0	0	0	0	0	0	0	0	0	0	0	0	0	0	0	0	2	8	22
106	François Ellis (RSA)	0	0	0	0	0	0	0	0	0	0	0	0	0	0	0	0	0	0	0	2	5	29
107	Malcolm Bradley (ENG)	0	0	0	0	0	0	0	0	0	0	0	0	0	0	0	0	0	0	0	2	10	27
108	Glen Wilkinson (AUS)	0	0	0	0	0	0	0	0	0	0	0	0	0	0	0	0	0	0	0	2	5	25
109	Duncan Campbell (SCO) (New)	–	–	–	–	–	–	–	–	0	0	0	0	0	0	0	0	0	0	0	1	7	4
110	Matt Gibson (SCO)	0	0	0	0	0	0	0	0	0	0	0	0	0	0	0	0	0	0	0	1	7	31
111	Vic Harris (ENG)	0	0	0	0	0	0	0	0	0	0	0	0	0	0	0	0	0	0	0	1	7	23
112	Gino Rigitano (CAN)	0	0	0	0	0	0	0	0	0	0	0	0	0	0	0	0	0	0	0	1	6	35
113	Robbie Grace (RSA)	0	0	0	0	0	0	0	0	0	0	0	0	0	0	0	0	0	0	0	1	6	30
114	Jim Donnelly (SCO)	0	0	0	0	0	0	0	0	0	0	0	0	0	0	0	0	0	0	0	1	3	45
115	Jimmy van Rensberg (RSA)	0	0	0	0	0	0	0	0	0	0	0	0	0	0	0	0	0	0	0	1	3	39
116	Jack Fitzmaurice (ENG)	0	0	0	0	0	0	0	0	0	0	0	0	0	0	0	0	0	0	0	1	8	23
117	John Dunning (ENG)	0	0	0	0	0	0	0	0	0	0	0	0	0	0	0	0	0	0	0	1	8	28
118	Terry Whitthread (ENG)	0	0	0	0	0	0	0	0	0	0	0	0	0	0	0	0	0	0	0	1	6	14
119	Jim Bear (CAN) (NT) (PL)	0	0	0	0	0	0	0	0	0	0	0	0	0	0	0	0	0	0	0	1	5	32
120	Mike Darrington (ENG) (NT) (PL)	0	0	0	0	0	0	0	0	0	0	0	0	0	0	0	0	0	0	0	1	5	32
121	Dessie Sheehan (IRL) (NT) (PL)	0	0	0	0	0	0	0	0	0	0	0	0	0	0	0	0	0	0	0	1	4	41
122	Dennis Hughes (ENG) (NT) (PL)	0	0	0	0	0	0	0	0	0	0	0	0	0	0	0	0	0	0	0	1	3	25
123	Mike Watterson (ENG) (NT) (PL)	0	0	0	0	0	0	0	0	0	0	0	0	0	0	0	0	0	0	0	1	3	32
124	Paul Thornley (CAN) (NT)	N	N	N	N	N	N	N	0	N	N	N	N	0	N	N	N	N	0	0	1	0	20
125	Mark Wildman (ENG) (NT)	0	0	0	0	0	0	0	0	0	0	0	0	0	0	0	0	0	0	0	0	7	32
126	Billy Kelly (IRL) (NT) (PL)	0	0	0	0	0	0	0	0	N	N	N	N	0	N	N	N	N	0	0	0	7	11
127	Jim Meadowcroft (ENG) (NT) (PL)	0	0	0	0	0	0	0	0	0	0	0	0	0	0	0	0	0	0	0	0	6	21
128	Fred Davis (ENG) (NT) (PL)	0	0	0	0	0	0	0	0	0	0	0	0	0	0	0	0	0	0	0	0	5	32
129	Geoff Foulds (ENG) (NT)	0	0	0	0	0	0	0	0	0	0	0	0	0	0	0	0	0	0	0	0	5	29
130	Greg Jenkins (AUS) (NT)	0	0	0	0	0	0	0	0	N	N	N	N	0	N	N	N	N	0	0	0	3	24
131	Jackie Rea (NIR) (NT)	0	0	0	0	0	0	0	0	0	0	0	0	0	0	0	0	0	0	0	0	2	38
132	Bernie Mikkelsen (CAN) (NT)	0	0	0	0	0	0	0	0	N	N	N	N	0	N	N	N	N	0	0	0	2	20
133	Ian Black (SCO) (NT)	0	0	0	0	0	0	0	0	N	N	N	N	0	N	N	N	N	0	0	0	2	10
134	Clive Everton (WAL) (NT)	N	N	N	N	N	N	N	N	0	N	N	N	0	N	N	N	N	0	0	0	1	3
135	Derek Mienie (RSA) (NT)	N	N	N	N	N	N	N	0	N	N	N	N	N	N	N	N	N	0	0	0	1	20
136	Patsy Fagan (IRL) (NT)	0	0	0	0	0	0	0	0	N	N	N	N	0	N	N	N	N	0	0	0	1	13
137	Pascal Burke (IRL) (NT)	0	0	0	0	0	0	0	0	N	N	N	N	0	N	N	N	N	0	0	0	1	12
138	Jim Rempe (USA) (NT)	0	0	0	0	0	0	0	0	N	N	N	N	N	N	N	N	N	0	0	0	1	12
139	Ian Anderson (AUS) (NT)	0	0	0	0	0	0	0	0	N	N	N	N	N	N	N	N	N	0	0	0	0	7
140	Bernard Bennett (ENG) (NT)	N	N	N	N	N	N	N	0	N	N	N	N	N	N	N	N	N	0	0	0	0	4
141	Derek Heaton (ENG) (NT)	N	N	N	N	N	N	N	0	N	N	N	N	0	N	N	N	N	0	0	0	0	3
142	Joe Cagianello (CAN) (NT)	N	N	N	N	N	N	N	0	N	N	N	N	N	N	N	N	N	0	0	0	0	0
143	Lou Condo (AUS) (NT)	N	N	N	N	N	N	N	0	N	N	N	N	N	N	N	N	N	0	0	0	0	0
144	Bert Demarco (SCO) (NT)	N	N	N	N	N	N	N	0	N	N	N	N	N	N	N	N	N	0	0	0	0	0
145	Manuel Francisco (RSA) (NT)	N	N	N	N	N	N	N	0	N	N	N	N	N	N	N	N	N	0	0	0	0	0
146	Sam Frangie (AUS) (NT)	0	0	0	0	0	0	0	0	0	0	0	0	0	0	0	0	0	0	0	0	0	0
147	James Giannaros (AUS) (NT)	N	N	N	N	N	N	N	0	N	N	N	N	N	N	N	N	N	0	0	0	0	0
148	David Greaves (ENG) (NT)	N	N	N	N	N	N	N	0	N	N	N	N	N	N	N	N	N	0	0	0	0	0
149	John Hargreaves (ENG) (NT)	N	N	N	N	N	N	N	0	N	N	N	N	N	N	N	N	N	0	0	0	0	0
150	Mike Hines (RSA) (NT)	N	N	N	N	N	N	N	0	N	N	N	N	N	N	N	N	N	0	0	0	0	0
151	Frank Jonik (CAN) (NT)	0	0	0	0	0	0	0	0	N	N	N	N	N	N	N	N	N	0	0	0	0	0
152	Eddie McLaughlin (SCO) (NT)	N	N	N	N	N	N	N	0	N	N	N	N	N	N	N	N	N	0	0	0	0	0
153	Steve Mizerak (USA) (NT)	N	N	N	N	N	N	N	0	N	N	N	N	N	N	N	N	N	0	0	0	0	0
154	Paddy Morgan (AUS) (NT)	N	N	N	N	N	N	N	0	N	N	N	N	N	N	N	N	N	0	0	0	0	0
155	Maurice Parkin (ENG) (NT)	N	N	N	N	N	N	N	0	N	N	N	N	N	N	N	N	N	0	0	0	0	0
156	Vladimir Potazsnyk (AUS) (NT)	0	0	0	0	0	0	0	0	0	0	0	0	0	0	0	0	0	0	0	0	0	0
157	Gerry Watson (CAN) (NT)	N	N	N	N	N	N	N	–	N	N	N	N	N	N	N	N	N	0	0	0	0	0
158	Bill Werbeniuk (CAN) (NT)	0	0	0	0	0	0	0	0	0	0	0	0	0	0	0	0	0	0	0	0	0	0

Preceded by 1989–90	1990–91	Succeeded by 1991–92
