= 1989 Welsh Professional Championship =

Welsh Professional Championship
Tournament information
- Dates: 13–18 February 1989
- Venue: Newport Centre
- City: Newport
- Country: Wales
- Organisation: WPBSA
- Format: Non-ranking event
- Total prize fund: £26,000
- Winner's share: £10,500
- Highest break: Doug Mountjoy (124)

Final
- Champion: Doug Mountjoy
- Runner-up: Terry Griffiths
- Score: 9–6

The 1989 Senator Windows Welsh Professional Championship was a professional non-ranking snooker tournament, which took place between 13 and 18 February 1989 at the Newport Centre in Newport, Wales.

Doug Mountjoy won the tournament defeating Terry Griffiths 9–6 in the final.

== Prize fund ==
The breakdown of prize money for this year is shown below:

- Winner: £10,500
- Runner-up: £6,000
- Semi-final: £2,500
- Quarter-final: £750
- Round 1: £150
- Highest break: £1,200
- Total: £26,000

== Main draw ==
Last 16; Best of 11 frames
Mark Bennett	6
Colin Roscoe	4
Darren Morgan	6
Tony Chappel	5

Quarter-finals; Best of 11 frames
Doug Mountjoy	6
Ray Reardon	3
Mark Bennett	6
Cliff Wilson	1
Terry Griffiths	6
Darren Morgan	5
Steve Newbury	6
Wayne Jones	5

Semi-finals; Best of 17 frames
Doug Mountjoy	9
Mark Bennett	5
Terry Griffiths	9
Steve Newbury	7

Final; Best of 17 frames
Doug Mountjoy	9
Terry Griffiths	6
