= 1990 Welsh Professional Championship =

Welsh Professional Championship
Tournament information
- Dates: 12–17 February 1990
- Venue: Newport Centre
- City: Newport
- Country: Wales
- Organisation: WPBSA
- Format: Non-ranking event
- Total prize fund: £27,500
- Winner's share: £10,500
- Highest break: Darren Morgan (130)

Final
- Champion: Darren Morgan
- Runner-up: Doug Mountjoy
- Score: 9–7

The 1990 Senator Windows Welsh Professional Championship was a professional non-ranking snooker tournament, which took place between 12 and 17 February 1990 at the Newport Centre in Newport, Wales.

Darren Morgan won the tournament defeating Doug Mountjoy 9–7 in the final.

== Prize fund ==
The breakdown of prize money for this year is shown below:

- Winner: £10,500
- Runner-up: £6,000
- Semi-final: £2,750
- Quarter-final: £900
- Round 1: £350
- Highest break: £1,200
- Total: £27,500

== Main draw ==
Last 16; Best of 11 frames
Darren Morgan	6
Colin Roscoe	4
Ray Reardon	6
Mark Bennett	2

Quarter-finals; Best of 11 frames
Darren Morgan	6
Terry Griffiths	4
Tony Chappel	6
Cliff Wilson	4
Doug Mountjoy	6
Ray Reardon	3
Wayne Jones	6
Steve Newbury	3

Semi-finals; Best of 17 frames
Darren Morgan	9
Tony Chappel	8
Doug Mountjoy	9
Wayne Jones	7

Final; Best of 17 frames
Darren Morgan	9
Doug Mountjoy	7
