= 1991 Welsh Professional Championship =

Welsh Professional Championship
Tournament information
- Dates: 10–15 February 1991
- Venue: Newport Centre
- City: Newport
- Country: Wales
- Organisation: WPBSA
- Format: Non-ranking event
- Total prize fund: £35,000
- Winner's share: £11,000
- Highest break: Darren Morgan (123)

Final
- Champion: Darren Morgan
- Runner-up: Mark Bennett
- Score: 9–3

The 1991 Regal Welsh Professional Championship was a professional non-ranking snooker tournament, which took place between 10 and 15 February 1991 at the Newport Centre in Newport, Wales. This was the final edition of the tournament.

Darren Morgan won the tournament defeating Mark Bennett 9–3 in the final.

== Prize fund ==
The breakdown of prize money for this year is shown below:

- Winner: £11,000
- Runner-up: £7,000
- Semi-final: £3,750
- Quarter-final: £1,750
- Round 1: £1,000
- Highest break: £1,500
- Total: £35,000

== Main draw ==
Last 16; Best of 11 frames
Ray Reardon	6
Colin Roscoe	5

Quarter-finals; Best of 11 frames
Darren Morgan	6
Ray Reardon	4
Wayne Jones	6
Cliff Wilson	4
Mark Bennett	6
Steve Newbury	4
Tony Chappel	6
Terry Griffiths	3

Semi-finals; Best of 17 frames
Darren Morgan	9
Wayne Jones	8
Mark Bennett	9
Tony Chappel	5

Final; Best of 17 frames
Darren Morgan	9
Mark Bennett	3
