= Tony Chappel =

Welsh snooker player

Personal information
- Born: May 28, 1960 (age 66)

Sport
- Country: Wales
- Sport: Snooker
- Professional: 1984–2001
- Highest ranking: 37
- Best ranking finish: Semi-final (1990 Asian Open)

Tony Chappel (born 28 May 1960) is a former Welsh professional snooker player, whose career spanned seventeen years from 1984 to 2001.

== Career ==
Tony Chappel was born in Wales, on 28 May 1960. He started playing snooker aged 14. He reached the final of the 1974 Welsh Boys' Championship, won the title in 1976, and retained it in 1977. He was also runner-up in the Welsh Youth Championship in 1977. In 1982 he became an "apprentice professional" employed by the Mackworth Billiards company, where he was coached by Terry Griffiths, the 1979 World Snooker Champion. That year, he defeated professional Cliff Wilson in the final of a pro-am tournament at Ealing Snooker Centre.

Chappel was accepted by the World Professional Billiards and Snooker Association as a professional player in 1984. Some of the players he defeated during his career include: Steve Davis, Terry Griffiths, John Parrott, Stephen Hendry, Alan McManus, Stephen Lee and Ken Doherty. His best finish was one semi-final appearance, at the 1990 Asian Open, where he lost just 5–6, to Dennis Taylor. He also reached the quarter-finals and last 16 of other tournaments throughout his career, his last run to this stage of an event being the last 16 of the 1997 Welsh Open.

He qualified for the main stage of the World Snooker Championship in 1990, losing 4–10 to Tony Knowles in the last 32.

He was relegated from the professional tour after finishing 115th in the rankings at the end of the 2000/01 snooker season. In April 2013 Chappel took part in the preliminary qualifiers for the 2013 World Snooker Championship. He beat David Singh 5–2 in the second round. but then lost 5–1 to Patrick Wallace in the third round.

== Performance and rankings timeline ==
Tournament	1984/ 85	1985/ 86	1986/ 87	1987/ 88	1988/ 89	1989/ 90	1990/ 91	1991/ 92	1992/ 93	1993/ 94		1994/ 95	1995/ 96	1996/ 97	1997/ 98	1998/ 99	1999/ 00	2000/ 01	2001/ 02	2002/ 03	2011/ 12	2012/ 13	2013/ 14	2014/ 15	2015/ 16
Ranking (Note: It shows the ranking at the beginning of the season)	(Note: New players on the Main Tour do not have a ranking)	68	49	58	51	41	43	37	52	48		53	53	45	46	47	76	90	(Note: He was an amateur)						
Ranking tournaments
Australian Goldfields Open (Note: The event was also called the Australian Masters (1984/1985-1987/1988 and 1995/1996), the Hong Kong Open (1989/1990) and the Australian Open (1994/1995-1995/1996))	Non-Ranking Event				NH	LQ	Tournament Not Held					Non-Ranking		Tournament Not Held							A	A	A	A	A
UK Championship	1R	2R	1R	3R	1R	1R	2R	LQ	LQ	2R		LQ	LQ	1R	LQ	1R	LQ	LQ	A	A	A	A	A	A	A
German Masters (Note: The event was called the German Open (1995/1996-1997/1998))	Tournament Not Held												LQ	LQ	LQ	NR	Tournament Not Held				A	A	A	A	A
Welsh Open	Tournament Not Held							1R	1R	1R		1R	3R	3R	2R	2R	LQ	LQ	A	A	A	A	A	A	A
World Grand Prix	Tournament Not Held																							NR	DNQ
Players Tour Championship Grand Final	Tournament Not Held																				DNQ	DNQ	DNQ	DNQ	DNQ
China Open	Tournament Not Held														NR	LQ	LQ	LQ	A	NH	A	A	A	A	A
World Championship	LQ	LQ	LQ	LQ	LQ	1R	LQ	LQ	LQ	LQ		LQ	LQ	LQ	LQ	LQ	LQ	LQ	LQ	A	A	LQ	A	A	A
Non-ranking tournaments
World Seniors Championship	Tournament Not Held							A	Tournament Not Held												LQ	F	QF	LQ	LQ
The Masters	A	A	A	A	A	A	LQ	LQ	LQ	LQ		LQ	LQ	LQ	LQ	LQ	LQ	LQ	LQ	LQ	A	A	A	A	A
Shoot-Out	Tournament Not Held						WD	Tournament Not Held													A	A	A	A	A
Former ranking tournaments
Canadian Masters	NH	Non-Ranking			LQ	Tournament Not Held																			
The Classic	LQ	LQ	LQ	1R	3R	1R	2R	LQ	Tournament Not Held																
Strachan Open (Note: The event was called the Strachan Challenge (1992/1993-1993/1994))	Tournament Not Held							1R	MR	NR		Tournament Not Held													
Asian Classic (Note: The event was called the Dubai Masters (1988/1989), the Dubai Classic (1989/1990-1994/1995) and the Thailand Classic (1995/1996))	Tournament Not Held				NR	2R	LQ	LQ	1R	1R		LQ	LQ	LQ	Tournament Not Held										
Malta Grand Prix	Tournament Not Held											Non-Ranking Event					LQ	NR	Tournament Not Held						
Thailand Masters (Note: The event was called the Asian Open (1989/1990-1992/1993) and the Thailand Open (1993/1994-1996/1997))	Non-Ranking			Not Held		1R	SF	1R	LQ	LQ		1R	LQ	LQ	LQ	LQ	LQ	LQ	A	NR	Tournament Not Held				
British Open	1R	LQ	1R	1R	2R	1R	LQ	1R	LQ	LQ		1R	LQ	1R	LQ	LQ	LQ	LQ	A	A	Tournament Not Held				
European Open (Note: The event was called the European Open (1988/1989-1996/1997 and 2001/2002-2002/2003) and the Irish Open (1998/1999))	Tournament Not Held				2R	3R	1R	1R	LQ	LQ		LQ	QF	1R	NH	LQ	Not Held		A	A	Tournament Not Held				
Scottish Open (Note: The event was also called the International Open (1984/1985, 1986/1987-1989/1990 and 1992/1993-1996/1997) and the Matchroom Trophy (1985/1986))	LQ	2R	1R	1R	1R	LQ	Not Held		LQ	LQ		1R	LQ	1R	1R	LQ	LQ	LQ	A	A	NH	MR	Not Held		
World Open (Note: The event was called the Grand Prix (1984/1985-2000/2001) and the LG Cup (2001/2002-2002/2003))	LQ	LQ	1R	2R	1R	LQ	LQ	LQ	3R	LQ		2R	LQ	LQ	LQ	LQ	LQ	LQ	A	A	A	A	A	Not Held	
Former non-ranking tournaments
World Masters	Tournament Not Held						3R	Tournament Not Held																	
Welsh Professional Championship	QF	QF	SF	QF	1R	SF	SF	Tournament Not Held																	
Strachan Challenge	Tournament Not Held							R	MR	LQ	LQ	Tournament Not Held													

Performance Table Legend
LQ	lost in the qualifying draw	#R	lost in the early rounds of the tournament (WR = Wildcard round, RR = Round robin)	QF	lost in the quarter-finals
SF	lost in the semi-finals	F	lost in the final	W	won the tournament
DNQ	did not qualify for the tournament	A	did not participate in the tournament	WD	withdrew from the tournament

NH / Not Held	means an event was not held.
NR / Non-Ranking Event	means an event is/was no longer a ranking event.
R / Ranking Event	means an event is/was a ranking event.
MR / Minor-Ranking Event	means an event is/was a minor-ranking event.
PA / Pro-am Event	means an event is/was a pro-am event.
