= Welsh Professional Championship =

Tournament information
- Venue: Newport Centre
- Location: Cardiff (1922); Caerphilly (1977); Ebbw Vale (1980-1984); Abertillery (1985-1986); Newport (1987-1991)
- Country: Wales
- Established: 1977
- Format: Non-ranking event
- Final year: 1991
- Final champion: Darren Morgan

The Welsh Professional Championship was a professional snooker tournament which was open only for Welsh players. It was the first of the four home countries to revive its national professional championship on a regular basis.

== History ==
The championship was first played in 1922, but it was more than 50 years before Ray Reardon and Doug Mountjoy met, in 1977, for an 'unofficial' Welsh Professional title. Reardon won that encounter 12–8. Even though the event was sponsored by William Hill it was not a success and was not held again until 1980.

The Ebbw Vale Leisure Centre staged the first official revived championship in 1980 and would host the championship until 1984. The event was sponsored by cider producers H. P. Bulmer, using their Woodpecker brand from 1980 until 1983 and their Strongbow brand in 1984. In 1985 and 1986 the event was held at the Abertillery Leisure Centre. The sponsorship was taken over by BCE for 1985 and Zetters for 1986. The event moved to the Newport Centre in 1985 and remained there until 1991. In the last five years the event had three different sponsors: Matchroom in 1987, Senator Windows between 1988 and 1990, and Regal in 1991.

After the 1991 event Regal withdraw their sponsorship and began to sponsor the Welsh Open – a new ranking event at the same venue, and the Welsh Professional Championship event hasn't been held since then.

== Winners ==
Year	Winner	Runner-up	Final score	Season
Challenge matches
1922	J.S Nicholls	W. Davies	1032–777 (Note: Aggregate score over 18 frames.)	
1977	Ray Reardon	Doug Mountjoy	12–8	1976/77
Knockout tournaments
1980	Doug Mountjoy	Ray Reardon	9–6	1979/80
1981	Ray Reardon	Cliff Wilson	9–6	1980/81
1982	Doug Mountjoy	Terry Griffiths	9–8	1981/82
1983	Ray Reardon	Doug Mountjoy	9–1	1982/83
1984	Doug Mountjoy	Cliff Wilson	9–3	1983/84
1985	Terry Griffiths	Doug Mountjoy	9–4	1984/85
1986	Terry Griffiths	Doug Mountjoy	9–3	1985/86
1987	Doug Mountjoy	Steve Newbury	9–7	1986/87
1988	Terry Griffiths	Wayne Jones	9–3	1987/88
1989	Doug Mountjoy	Terry Griffiths	9–6	1988/89
1990	Darren Morgan	Doug Mountjoy	9–7	1989/90
1991	Darren Morgan	Mark Bennett	9–3	1990/91
