= 1986 Welsh Professional Championship =

Welsh Professional Championship
Tournament information
- Dates: 10–14 February 1986
- Venue: Abertillery Leisure Centre
- City: Abertillery
- Country: Wales
- Organisation: WPBSA
- Format: Non-ranking event
- Total prize fund: £15,000
- Winner's share: £5,000
- Highest break: Colin Roscoe (81)

Final
- Champion: Terry Griffiths
- Runner-up: Doug Mountjoy
- Score: 9–3

The 1986 Zetters Welsh Professional Championship was a professional non-ranking snooker tournament, which took place between 10 and 14 February 1986 at the Abertillery Leisure Centre in Abertillery, Wales.

Terry Griffiths won the tournament defeating Doug Mountjoy 9–3 in the final.

== Prize fund ==
The breakdown of prize money for this year is shown below:

- Winner: £5,000
- Runner-up: £3,500
- Semi-final: £1,500
- Quarter-final: £750
- Highest break: £500
- Total: £15,000

== Main draw ==
Last 16; Best of 11 frames
Tony Chappel	w/o
Marcus Owen	w/d
Wayne Jones	6
Clive Everton	2

Quarter-finals; Best of 11 frames
Terry Griffiths	6
Tony Chappel	4
Cliff Wilson	6
Steve Newbury	4
Doug Mountjoy	6
Colin Roscoe	4
Wayne Jones	6
Ray Reardon	4

Semi-finals; Best of 17 frames
Terry Griffiths	9
Cliff Wilson	1
Doug Mountjoy	9
Wayne Jones	7

Final; Best of 17 frames
Terry Griffiths	9
Doug Mountjoy	3
