= 1988 Welsh Professional Championship =

Welsh Professional Championship
Tournament information
- Dates: 8–12 February 1988
- Venue: Newport Centre
- City: Newport
- Country: Wales
- Organisation: WPBSA
- Format: Non-ranking event
- Total prize fund: £22,500
- Winner's share: £9,000
- Highest break: Terry Griffiths (119)

Final
- Champion: Terry Griffiths
- Runner-up: Wayne Jones
- Score: 9–3

The 1988 Senator Windows Welsh Professional Championship was a professional non-ranking snooker tournament, which took place between 8 and 12 February 1988 at the Newport Centre in Newport, Wales.

Terry Griffiths won the tournament defeating Wayne Jones 9–3 in the final.

== Prize fund ==
The breakdown of prize money for this year is shown below:

- Winner: £9,000
- Runner-up: £5,500
- Semi-final: £2,250
- Quarter-final: £625
- Highest break: £1,000
- Total: £22,500

== Main draw ==
Last 16; Best of 11 frames
Tony Chappel	6
Colin Roscoe	4
Mark Bennett	6
Clive Everton	0

Quarter-finals; Best of 11 frames
Terry Griffiths	6
Tony Chappel	4
Cliff Wilson	6
Steve Newbury	3
Wayne Jones	6
Ray Reardon	5
Doug Mountjoy	6
Mark Bennett	3

Semi-finals; Best of 17 frames
Terry Griffiths	9
Cliff Wilson	7
Wayne Jones	9
Doug Mountjoy	5

Final; Best of 17 frames
Terry Griffiths	9
Wayne Jones	3
