= 1978 Champion of Champions =

1978 Daily Mirror Champion of Champions
Tournament information
- Dates: 2–3 November 1978
- Venue: Wembley Conference Centre
- City: London
- Country: England
- Organisation: WPBSA
- Format: Non-ranking event
- Total prize fund: £4,000
- Winner's share: £2,000
- Highest break: 94

Final
- Champion: Ray Reardon (WAL)
- Runner-up: Alex Higgins (NIR)
- Score: 11–9

The 1978 Champion of Champions (officially the 1978 Daily Mirror Champion of Champions) was a professional non‑ranking snooker tournament held on 2 and 3 November 1978 at the Wembley Conference Centre in London, England.

== Summary ==
Four players contested the tournament which was held over two days. The event was promoted by Michael Barrett, a boxing promoter.

Ray Reardon easily won the first semi‑final 6‍–‍1 after taking a 5‍–‍0 lead. In the evening match Doug Mountjoy led 3‍–‍2 but Alex Higgins won the next four frames to win 6‍–‍3. The 8th frame was won on a respotted black. In the final Reardon led Higgins 6‍–‍4 after the afternoon session. In the evening Reardon extended his lead to 9‍–‍5 before Higgins won the next four frames to level the match. In the 19th frame Reardon had a 77 clearance to win the frame and then won the 20th frame easily to win the match.

Brief highlights were shown on ITV's World of Sport on the following afternoon (Saturday 4 November, 3:10 pm).

== Prize fund ==
The breakdown of prize money for this year is shown below:

- Winner: £2,000
- Runner-up: £1,000
- Semi-finals: £500
- Total: £4,000

There was a £100 prize for every century break.

== Players ==
The following 4 players qualified for the tournament:

Player	Qualified as
Ray Reardon (WAL)	1978 World Snooker Championship winner
Patsy Fagan (IRL)	1977 UK Championship winner
Alex Higgins (NIR)	1978 Masters winner
Doug Mountjoy (WAL)	1978 Pot Black winner

== Main draw ==
Semi-finals; Best of 11 frames (2 November)
Ray Reardon (WAL)	6
Patsy Fagan (IRL)	1
Alex Higgins (NIR)	6
Doug Mountjoy (WAL)	3

Final; Best of 21 frames (3 November)
Ray Reardon (WAL)	11
Alex Higgins (NIR)	9

== Final ==
Final: Best of 21 frames. Referee: John Smyth. Wembley Conference Centre, London, England, 3 November 1978.
Ray Reardon; Wales	11–9	Alex Higgins; Northern Ireland
Afternoon: 125–8 (52), 90–43 (90), 75–46, 28–108, 60–43, 20–114 (83), 13–101 (76), 104–19 (70), 1–140 (61, 62), 84–22; Evening: 78–36, 101–18 (67), 12–100, 73–48 (61), 41–90, 51–60, 23–83 (51), 30–72, 78–46 (77), 94–12
(frame 2) 90	Highest break	83 (frame 6)
0	Century breaks	0
6	50+ breaks	5

== Century breaks ==
None. The highest break: 94 – Alex Higgins in the semi‑final.
