= Hong Kong Masters =

Snooker tournament

Tournament information
- Venue: Queen Elizabeth Stadium
- Location: Wan Chai
- Country: Hong Kong
- Established: 1983
- Organisation(s): WPBSA
- Format: Non-ranking event
- Total prize fund: £315,000
- Current champion: (England) Ronnie O'Sullivan

The Hong Kong Masters is a professional invitational snooker tournament which was initially held for six editions in the 1980s, before being revived in 2017.

The tournament was originally one of several established in Asia in the 1980s by Barry Hearn’s Matchroom organisation. The event became part of the World Series of Snooker in 1987. The final edition was in 1988, before running in 1990 as the World Series Challenge and 1991 as the Hong Kong Challenge. World Snooker announced it would be held again in 2017.

== Winners ==
Year	Winner	Runner-up	Final score	Season
Hong Kong Masters
1983	(Wales) Doug Mountjoy	(Wales) Terry Griffiths	4–3	1983/84
1984	(England) Steve Davis	(Wales) Doug Mountjoy	4–2	1984/85
1985	(Wales) Terry Griffiths	(England) Steve Davis	4–2	1985/86
1986	(England) Willie Thorne	(Northern Ireland) Dennis Taylor	8–3	1986/87
1987	(England) Steve Davis	(Scotland) Stephen Hendry	9–3	1987/88
1988	(England) Jimmy White	(England) Neal Foulds	9–3	1988/89
World Series Challenge
1990	(Thailand) James Wattana	(England) Jimmy White	9–3	1990/91
Hong Kong Challenge
1991	(Scotland) Stephen Hendry	(Thailand) James Wattana	9–1	1991/92
Hong Kong Masters
2017	(Australia) Neil Robertson	(England) Ronnie O'Sullivan	6–3	2017/18
2022	(England) Ronnie O'Sullivan	(Hong Kong) Marco Fu	6–4	2022/23
