= 1990 World Snooker Championship =

Professional snooker tournament

1990 Embassy World Snooker Championship
Tournament information
- Dates: 13–29 April 1990
- Venue: Crucible Theatre
- City: Sheffield
- Country: England
- Organisation: World Professional Billiards and Snooker Association
- Format: Ranking event
- Total prize fund: £620,800
- Winner's share: £120,000
- Highest break: John Parrott (ENG) (140)

Final
- Champion: Stephen Hendry (SCO)
- Runner-up: Jimmy White (ENG)
- Score: 18–12

The 1990 World Snooker Championship, (Note: also referred to as the 1990 Embassy World Snooker Championship for the purposes of sponsorship) was a professional snooker tournament that took place between 13 and 29 April 1990 at the Crucible Theatre in Sheffield, England. There was a total prize fund of £620,800. Organised by the World Professional Billiards and Snooker Association, it was the tenth and final ranking event of the 1989–90 snooker season and the fourteenth consecutive World Snooker Championship to be held at the Crucible, the first tournament at this location having taken place in 1977.

The defending champion was Steve Davis, who won the previous year's final 18–3 over John Parrott. Davis reached the semi-finals of the event, where he was defeated 14–16 by Jimmy White. White contested the final against Stephen Hendry, who defeated Parrott in the other semi-final 16–11. Hendry led 9–7 after the first day's play and won the first four frames of the second day to lead 13–7, before White reduced the gap to four frames. At 16–12, Hendry compiled breaks of 81 and 71 to win the match 18–12, claiming his first world title. In so doing, he became the youngest-ever world champion at the age of 21 years and 106 days. There were 18 century breaks made during the tournament, the highest of which was 140 made by Parrott.

The first four rounds of the qualifying competition were played at the Norbreck Castle Hotel, Blackpool from 22 to 27 January 1990, and the fifth and final round was played at Preston Guild Hall from 26 to 27 March. From this, 16 players qualified for the main event, where they met the 16 invited seeded players. The tournament was broadcast in the United Kingdom by the BBC, and was sponsored by the Embassy cigarette company. As champion, Hendry received £120,000 out of the total prize fund.

== Overview ==
The World Snooker Championship is an annual professional snooker tournament organised by the World Professional Billiards and Snooker Association (WPBSA). The cue sport of snooker was invented in the late 19th century by British Army soldiers stationed in India, and later became popular in the British Isles. However, in the modern era, which started in 1969 when the World Championship reverted to a knockout format, it has become increasingly popular worldwide, especially in East and Southeast Asian nations such as China, Hong Kong and Thailand.

The 1990 championship featured 32 professional players competing in one-on-one snooker matches in a single-elimination format, each round being played over a pre-determined number of frames, and each match divided into two or more sessions containing a set number of frames. These competitors in the main tournament were selected using a combination of the top players in the snooker world rankings and the winners of a pre-tournament qualification stage. The top 16 players in the world rankings automatically qualified for the event, the remaining 16 players coming through the qualification rounds. It was the tenth and final ranking event of the 1989–90 snooker season, and the fourteenth consecutive World Snooker Championship to be held at the Crucible, the first tournament there having taken place in 1977. The defending champion in 1989 was Steve Davis, who had defeated John Parrott 18–3 in the final of the 1988 World Snooker Championship to win his sixth world title. The tournament was sponsored by cigarette brand Embassy, and was also referred to as the Embassy World Snooker Championship. The tournament was broadcast in the United Kingdom by the BBC.

=== Prize fund ===
The winner of the event received £120,000 (equivalent to £427,852 in 2025) from a total prize fund of £620,800 (equivalent to £2,213,422 in 2025). The breakdown of prize money for this year is shown below:

- Winner: £120,000
- Runner-up: £72,000
- Semi-final: £36,000
- Quarter-final: £18,000
- Last 16: £9,000
- Last 32: £5,000
- Fifth qualifying round losers: £4,000
- Fourth qualifying round losers: £2062.50
- Third qualifying round losers: £400
- Second qualifying round losers: £250
- Televised rounds highest break: £12,000
- Qualifying rounds highest break: £3,000
- Televised rounds maximum break: £100,000

== Tournament summary ==
=== Qualifying ===
The first four rounds of the qualifying competition were played at the Norbreck Castle Hotel, Blackpool from 22 to 27 January 1990, and the fifth round was played at Preston Guild Hall from 26 to 27 March. All qualifying round matches were the best-of-19 frames. Bill Werbeniuk, who had been expelled from the World Professional Billiards and Snooker Association for refusing to pay a fine relating to the use of Beta blockers, was permitted to compete in a tournament for the first time since September 1988. He lost 1–10 to Nigel Bond. Bond was one of nine first-season professionals in the championship; all nine won their first-round matches, including James Wattana who eliminated Joe Grech 10–4.

In the second round, Marcel Gauvreau defeated 1957 runner-up Jackie Rea after needing two snookers in the deciding frame. Eight-time champion Fred Davis, aged 76, was eliminated 6–10 by Ian Brumby. In the third round, Murdo MacLeod recovered from 2–7 behind to defeat Nick Dyson 10–9. In another match that went to the deciding frame, Mick Price won the last three frames to defeat Steve Duggan. Brady Gollan beat Kirk Stevens 10–6, and Andrew Cairns defeated six-time champion Ray Reardon 10–8. Round four saw three-time former champion John Spencer eliminated 8–10 by Wattana. Jim Chambers defeated 1974 runner-up Graham Miles 10–5.

In the final qualifying round, Darren Morgan, Mark Bennett and Danny Fowler all recovered from 7–9 down, to defeat Bob Chaperon, Rex Williams and Barry West respectively. Nigel Gilbert made the highest break of the qualifying competition, 135, in the eleventh frame of his 10–6 win against David Roe. Bond and Price had both made breaks of 131 that were the highest before this. Silvino Francisco lost 7–10 to Gary Wilkinson and thus failed to qualify for the main event for the first time since 1982. Two-time world champion Alex Higgins qualified for the Crucible by beating Wattana 10–6, after missing out the previous year.

=== First round ===
The first round took place between 13 and 18 April, each match played over two sessions as the best of 19 frames. Eight different nationalities were represented, and there were four debutants at the main event this year: Gilbert, Gollan, Tony Chappel and Alain Robidoux, who all lost in the opening round. Chappel, in what turned out to be his only appearance at the main tournament, and Gilbert who both lost 4–10, to Tony Knowles and Terry Griffiths respectively. Gollan, who had won five matches just to qualify, led Doug Mountjoy 8–7 before losing the last three frames. Robidoux and Stephen Hendry were level at 7–7 in their first round match when the referee announced that Robidoux had committed a foul by making a push shot. Hendry compiled a break of 58 to win that frame, and added the following two frames to progress 10–7.

Defending champion Steve Davis lost the first frame to Eddie Charlton but won 10–1. Higgins lost 5–10 to Steve James in the first round. In the eleventh frame, James was awarded a free ball in a frame before any reds had been potted. In taking a baulk colour as an extra red ball and compiling a total clearance of 135; the break became the first 16-red clearance in a professional tournament. After losing the match, Higgins remained in his seat in the arena for some time, ordering several vodka and orange drinks, slouched in his chair and twitching. Afterwards, he punched tournament official Colin Randle in the abdomen before the start of a press conference at which he announced his retirement, and criticised the WPBSA and the press. This followed another incident at the 1990 World Cup, where he repeatedly argued with fellow player and compatriot Dennis Taylor, insulting his late mother and threatening to have him shot if he returned to Northern Ireland. For his conduct, Higgins was banned for the rest of the season and all of the next.

Although he made a 102 break in the 5th frame, Tony Drago trailed Willie Thorne 3–6 after their first session. Drago, who playing rashly according to journalist Janice Hale, lost the match 4–10. Dennis Taylor was 1–5 behind Neal Foulds but recovered to 4–5. Foulds had a four-frame lead at 9–5 and eventually won 10–8. John Virgo defeated Wilkinson 10–6 for only his second win in eight appearances at the Crucible. Jimmy White led Fowler 6–3 after their first session and went on to win 10–4. Tony Meo beat Wayne Jones 10–8.

Morgan caught chicken pox the week before the championship and was treated in hospital for three days before receiving a certification that he was not infectious, which enabled him to participate. From 4–5 down against 1986 champion Joe Johnson he went on to win 10–8. Although Mike Hallett defeated Steve Newbury 10–9, his own manager Ian Doyle criticised Hallett, saying that his professional attitude ha[d] been poor since winning the 1989 Hong Kong Open. Hallett accepted Doyle's comments and remarked that he "needed a kick up the backside." Cliff Wilson made his 8th and final crucible appearance at the age of 55. He never got past the world championship first round in his career and that run was not to change as he was eliminated 6–10 by Cliff Thorburn. Dean Reynolds led Peter Francisco 6–3 after their first session. During the second session, Francisco fluked a re-spotted black in the 12th frame. Parrott trailed Bennett 7–9, but took the next two to force a deciding frame that he won on the pink ball after a break of 69 after being 59 points behind.

=== Second round ===
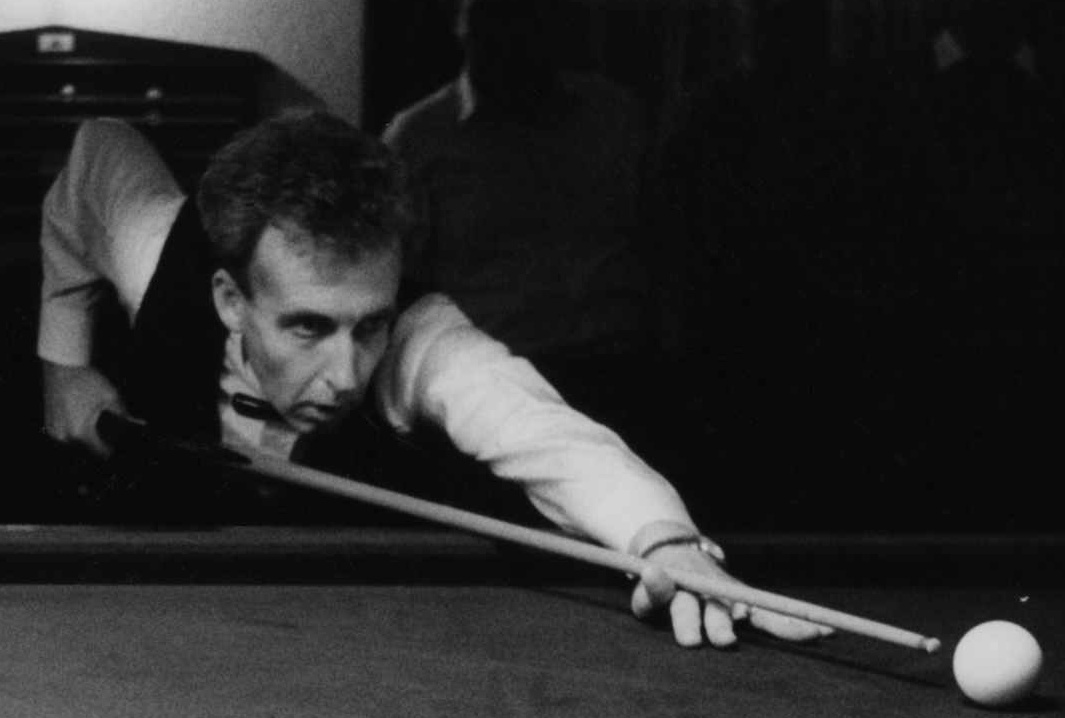
Terry Griffiths (pictured in 1991) reached the quarter-finals for the seventh consecutive year.

The second round, which took place between 18 and 22 April, was played as best-of-25-frames matches spread over three sessions. Davis led James 5–3 after their first session, and added the first five frames of the second session. The second session finished with Davis 11–5 up, and he went on to win 13–7. Foulds and Thorne each won four frames in the first session of their match, with Foulds taking the eighth frame on a re-spotted black. Foulds won five consecutive frames from 8–11 and eliminated Thorne. Griffiths led Knowles 10–3 and 11–5, and won 13–6. Virgo won the first three frames against White, but the pair were at 4–4 when the first session finished. White took all eight frames in the second session and progressed with the score at 13–6.

Hendry established a 4–1 lead against Meo, but then lost two of the next three frames. During the second session, Hendry compiled three century breaks, and finished it 11–5 ahead. During the 16th frame, referee John Williams judged that Meo had made a foul push shot; after this, Hendry made a break of 106. He eventually won the match 13–7. Morgan and Hallett were level at 4–4 after their first session. Morgan compiled a 104 break to win the first frame of the next session, and went on to establish an 8–4 lead, before finishing the session 10–6 ahead and winning the match 13–8. Thorburn won the deciding frame against Mountjoy at nearly 1:00 a.m., in a match that took 12 hours and 37 minutes. In another lengthy match, where the players had to suspend play as they over-ran the session time and had to return for the last two frames after another match finished, Parrott defeated Reynolds 13–11. Parrot won the 24th frame by fluking the pink ball. The pair had been level at 5–5, 7–7, and 9–9.

=== Quarter-finals ===
The quarter-finals were played as best-of-25-frames matches over three sessions on 23 and 24 April. None of the matches produced a close finish. Davis led Foulds 6–2 after their first session. Foulds won six of the first seven frames in the second session; the only one he lost was after referee Len Ganley called a foul for Foulds striking the cueball twice on a shot. Leading 8–7 going into the final session, Foulds saw Davis win five successive frames to progress 13–8. Griffiths, who was under treatment for a trapped nerve in his shoulder, was a frame behind White at 4–5 but then lost eight of the next nine frames and was eliminated. White commented that "Every time he made a mistake, I punished him heavily."

Hendry was level with Morgan at 4–4 but then pulled away and won 13–6. After the match, Hendry commented "I think I'm getting stronger and playing well when it matters". Parrott compiled the highest break of the tournament, 140, while building an 8–4 lead against Thorburn, and went on to win 13–6.

=== Semi-finals ===
The semi-finals took place between 25 and 27 April as best-of-31-frames matches played over four sessions. For the first time since 1982, Davis failed to reach the final, losing 14–16 to White in the semi-final. It was the first time White had defeated Davis at the Crucible after Davis had eliminated White in four previous encounters. From 6–8 at the close of the second session, White won seven of the eight frames in the third session to lead 13–9. After winning the 27th frame on the black ball after needing a snooker, Davis moved to within one frame of White at 13–14, and led by 40 points in the 28th frame before White won that to go two frames clear with three to play, conceding one further frame before clinching victory.

In beating Parrott, Hendry ensured that he would replace Davis as snooker's world number 1 in the rankings. Davis had held first place since 1983. Parrott had led 4–0, and was 5–3 ahead at the end of their first session. Hendry won the next six frames to lead 9–5, followed by Parrott winning six consecutive frames, leaving Hendry 9–11 behind. Hendry won the last two frames of the third session to equalise at 11–11 and added the first five frames of the fourth session to complete a 16–11 victory.

=== Final ===
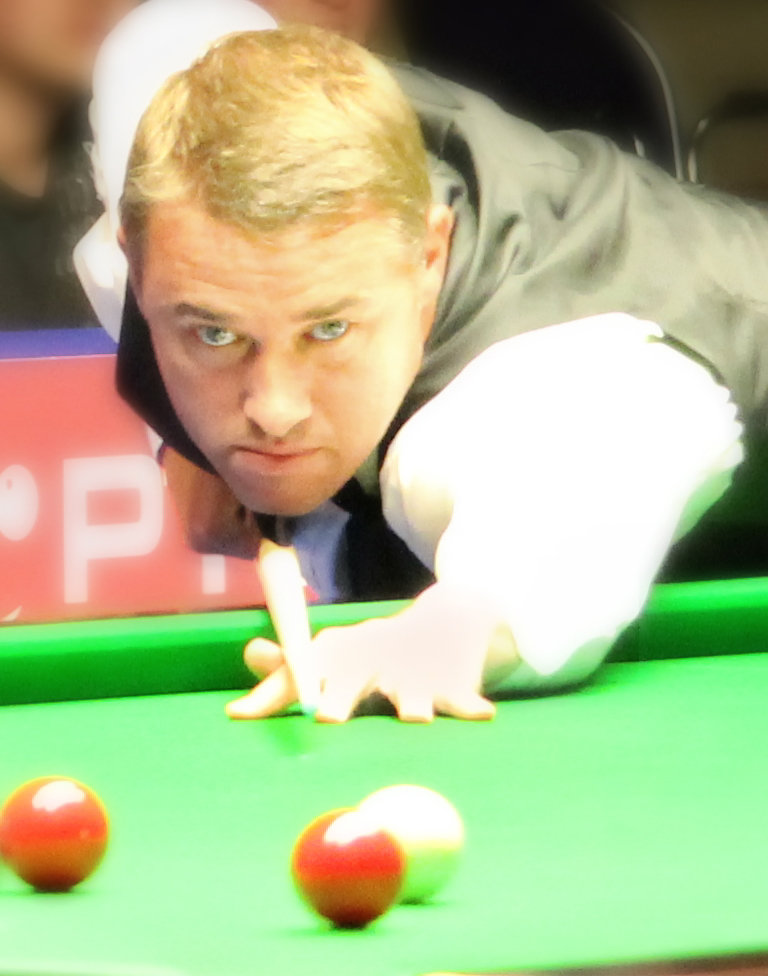
Stephen Hendry (pictured in 2011) became the youngest-ever World Snooker Champion.

The final between Stephen Hendry and Jimmy White took place on 28 and 29 April. The first seven frames of the final saw a total of seven breaks over 40, and saw Hendry leading 4–3. After White had won the first frame, Hendry equalised with a break of 72, but a miss and foul by Hendry in the third frame gave White the chance to regain the lead. Hendry took the next three frames for 4–2, then White claimed frame seven with a break of 82. Hendry led 9–7 after the first day, having compiled a 108 break in the 16th frame.

On the second day, Hendry won the first four frames, making a break of 104 in the second, with White failing to pot a ball in three of them. He later wrote that at the start of the day, he perceived that White showed "that he's desperate to win, yet secretly knows he will struggle. It's almost imperceptible — a tiny inwards movement around the eyes, a fleeting nip of teeth on lip — but it's there." White reflected that "Every time I got near him, he eased into a higher gear." From 7–13, White took the 21st frame with a break of 82, and added the following frame to reduce his deficit to 9–13. In the 23rd frame, White led by 63 points before Hendry produced a clearance of 72 to win on the black ball. The session finished with Hendry 14–10 ahead after White won the session's last frame with breaks of 51 and 45. The first three frames of the fourth session were completed in 27 minutes and included a 108 clearance by Hendry. White took the following frame, before breaks of 81 and 71 secured a first world championship title for Hendry. He became the youngest-ever world champion at the age of 21 years and 106 days, overtaking Alex Higgins, who had won the 1972 World Snooker Championship a few days before his 23rd birthday. The final was described by the snooker journalist Terry Smith as "a two-day high-speed potting battle that left the sell-out crowd virtually breathless."

Hendry commented after his win that "I was determined to win and confident that I could do it. I was glad I was able to keep my concentration and cope with the pressure. All through the match I was nervous. My stomach was churning tonight." White said that he was disappointed with the standard of his own safety play during the match, but said that he had enjoyed the match, and added "In a way I'm pleased for Stephen. He's a great kid and he puts in enough work to be world champion. He played tremendous snooker. You could count his misses on one hand." The final attracted 7.55 million viewers on BBC2. Hendry went on to win six more world titles, including further victories over White in the 1992, 1993 and 1994 finals.

== Main draw ==
Shown below are the results for each round. The numbers in parentheses beside some of the players are their seeding ranks; there were 16 seeds and 16 qualifiers.

First round Best of 19 frames
13 April
Steve Davis (ENG) (1)	10
Eddie Charlton (AUS)	1
13 & 14 April
Steve James (ENG) (16)	10
Alex Higgins (NIR)	5
14 & 15 April
Willie Thorne (ENG) (9)	10
Tony Drago (MLT)	4
15 & 15 April
Dennis Taylor (NIR) (8)	8
Neal Foulds (ENG)	10
15 & 16 April
Terry Griffiths (WAL) (5)	10
Nigel Gilbert (ENG)	4
16 & 17 April
Tony Knowles (ENG) (12)	10
Tony Chappel (WAL)	4
16 & 17 April
John Virgo (ENG) (13)	10
Gary Wilkinson (ENG)	6
17 & 18 April
Jimmy White (ENG) (4)	10
Danny Fowler (ENG)	4
17 & 18 April
Stephen Hendry (SCO) (3)	10
Alain Robidoux (CAN)	7
17 April
Tony Meo (ENG) (14)	10
Wayne Jones (WAL)	8
16 April
Joe Johnson (ENG) (11)	8
Darren Morgan (WAL)	10
15 & 16 April
Mike Hallett (ENG) (6)	10
Steve Newbury (WAL)	9
14 & 15 April
Cliff Thorburn (CAN) (7)	10
Cliff Wilson (WAL)	6
14 & 15 April
Doug Mountjoy (WAL) (10)	10
Brady Gollan (CAN)	8
13 & 14 April
Dean Reynolds (ENG) (15)	10
Peter Francisco (RSA)	7
13 April
John Parrott (ENG) (2)	10
Mark Bennett (WAL)	9

Second round Best of 25 frames
18 & 19 April
Steve Davis (ENG) (1)	13
Steve James (ENG) (16)	7
19 & 20 April
Willie Thorne (ENG) (9)	11
Neal Foulds (ENG)	13
20, 21 & 22 April
Terry Griffiths (WAL) (5)	13
Tony Knowles (ENG) (12)	6
21 & 22 April
John Virgo (ENG) (13)	6
Jimmy White (ENG) (4)	13
21 & 22 April
Stephen Hendry (SCO) (3)	13
Tony Meo (ENG) (14)	7
20, 21 & 22 April
Darren Morgan (WAL)	13
Mike Hallett (ENG) (6)	8
19 & 20 April
Cliff Thorburn (CAN) (7)	13
Doug Mountjoy (WAL) (10)	12
18, 19 & 20 April
Dean Reynolds (ENG) (15)	11
John Parrott (ENG) (2)	13

Quarter-finals; Best of 25 frames
23 & 24 April
Steve Davis (ENG) (1)	13
Neal Foulds (ENG)	8
23 & 24 April
Terry Griffiths (WAL) (5)	5
Jimmy White (ENG) (4)	13
23 & 24 April
Stephen Hendry (SCO) (3)	13
Darren Morgan (WAL)	6
23 & 24 April
Cliff Thorburn (CAN) (7)	6
John Parrott (ENG) (2)	13

Semi-finals; Best of 31 frames
25, 26 & 27 April
Steve Davis (ENG) (1)	14
Jimmy White (ENG) (4)	16
25, 26 & 27 April
Stephen Hendry (SCO) (3)	16
John Parrott (ENG) (2)	11

Final; Best of 35 frames
28 and 29 April
Jimmy White (ENG) (4)	12
Stephen Hendry (SCO) (3)	18

Final: (Best of 35 frames) Crucible Theatre, Sheffield, 28 and 29 April 1990. Referee: Len Ganley
Jimmy White (ENG)				12–18			Stephen Hendry (SCO)			
Session 1: 3–4
Frame	1	2	3	4	5	6	7	8	9	10
White	78^{†}	13	85^{†}	49	14	27	86^{†} (82)	N/A	N/A	N/A
Hendry	37	73^{†} (72)	48	71^{†}	79^{†}	60^{†}	0	N/A	N/A	N/A
Session 2: 7–9
Frame	1	2	3	4	5	6	7	8	9	10
White	27	75^{†} (67)	68^{†}	46	4	63^{†} (62)	0	76^{†}	0	N/A
Hendry	87^{†}	64	57	77^{†}	99^{†} (66)	52	88^{†} (53)	1	108^{†} (108)	N/A
Session 3: 10–14
Frame	1	2	3	4	5	6	7	8	9	10
White	0	5	4	0	87^{†} (82)	75^{†}	63	109^{†} (51)	N/A	N/A
Hendry	100^{†} (66)	104^{†} (104)	73^{†} (58)	81^{†} (81)	50	17	72^{†} (72)	0	N/A	N/A
Session 4: 12–18
Frame	1	2	3	4	5	6	7	8	9	10
White	6	127^{†} (87)	0	69^{†} (51)	27	1	N/A	N/A	N/A	N/A
Hendry	97^{†} (57)	0	124^{†} (108)	43	90^{†} (81)	101^{†} (71)	N/A	N/A	N/A	N/A
87				Highest break			108			
0				Century breaks			2			
7				50+ breaks			13			
† = Winner of frame

== Qualifying ==
Players in bold denote match winners.

**First qualifying round** Best of 19 frames
Player	Score	Player
**Duncan Campbell (SCO)**	**10**–3	David Greaves (ENG)
**James Wattana (THA)**	**10**–4	Joe Grech (MLT)
**Andrew Cairns (ENG)**	**10**–4	Bernard Bennett (ENG)
**Barry Pinches (ENG)**	**10**–0	Maurice Parkin (ENG)
**Jackie Rea (NIR)**	**10**–4	Pascal Burke (IRL)
**Gino Rigitano (CAN)**	w.o. –w.d.	Eddie McLaughlin (SCO)
**Greg Jenkins (AUS)**	**10**–5	Geoff Foulds (ENG)
**Paul Watchorn (IRL)**	**10**–4	Billy Kelly (IRL)
**Nigel Bond (ENG)**	**10**–1	Bill Werbeniuk (CAN)
**Derek Mienie (RSA)**	**10**–1	Jim Meadowcroft (ENG)
**Brady Gollan (CAN)**	**10**–2	Clive Everton (WAL)
**Brian Morgan (ENG)**	**10**–1	Derek Heaton (ENG)
**Stephen Murphy (IRL)**	**10**–7	Bernie Mikkelsen (CAN)
**Ian Brumby (ENG)**	**10**–6	Bert Demarco (SCO)
**Nick Dyson (ENG)**	**10**–5	Ian Black (SCO)

**Second qualifying round** Best of 19 frames
**Mick Price (ENG)**	**10**
Terry Whitthread (ENG)	6
Jon Wright (ENG)	6
**Duncan Campbell (SCO)**	**10**
**Ken Owers (ENG)**	**10**
Mike Darrington (ENG)	1
John Dunning (ENG)	2
**James Wattana (THA)**	**10**
**Eddie Sinclair (SCO)**	**10**
Mark Wildman (ENG)	5
**Mark Rowing (ENG)**	**10**
Robby Foldvari (AUS)	9
**Les Dodd (ENG)**	**10**
Mike Watterson (ENG)	3
**Steve Campbell (ENG)**	**10**
Glen Wilkinson (AUS)	2
George Scott (ENG)	3
**Andrew Cairns (ENG)**	**10**
**Tony Kearney (IRL)**	**10**
Paul Medati (ENG)	7
Bill Oliver (ENG)	8
**Barry Pinches (ENG)**	**10**
**Mario Morra (CAN)**	w.o.
Jimmy van Rensberg (RSA)	w.d.
**Marcel Gauvreau (CAN)**	**10**
Jackie Rea (NIR)	9
**Robert Marshall (ENG)**	**10**
Paul Thornley (CAN)	0
Jim Donnelly (SCO)	6
**Gino Rigitano (CAN)**	**10**
**Robbie Grace (RSA)**	**10**
Anthony Harris (ENG)	8
**Craig Edwards (ENG)**	**10**
Dessie Sheehan (IRL)	8
**Bob Harris (ENG)**	**10**
Greg Jenkins (AUS)	4
**Jim Bear (CAN)**	**10**
Jack Fitzmaurice (ENG)	5
**Graham Miles (ENG)**	**10**
Dennis Hughes (ENG)	5
**John Rea (SCO)**	**10**
Jason Smith (ENG)	4
**Martin Smith (ENG)**	**10**
Francois Ellis (RSA)	6
Vic Harris (ENG)	6
**Paul Watchorn (IRL)**	**10**
Brian Rowswell (ENG)	1
**Nigel Bond (ENG)**	**10**
**Pat Houlihan (ENG)**	**10**
Derek Mienie (RSA)	5
**Tony Wilson (IOM)**	**10**
Steve Meakin (ENG)	5
Paul Gibson (ENG)	5
**Brady Gollan (CAN)**	**10**
Ian Williamson (ENG)	4
**Brian Morgan (ENG)**	**10**
**Nick Terry (ENG)**	**10**
Stephen Murphy (IRL)	4
Fred Davis (ENG)	6
**Ian Brumby (ENG)**	**10**
**Eric Lawlor (ENG)**	**10**
Matt Gibson (SCO)	6
Malcolm Bradley (ENG)	6
**Nick Dyson (ENG)**	**10**

**Third qualifying round** Best of 19 frames
Steve Duggan (ENG)	9
**Mick Price (ENG)**	**10**
**John Campbell (AUS)**	**10**
Duncan Campbell (SCO)	5
**John Spencer (ENG)**	**10**
Ken Owers (ENG)	8
David Taylor (ENG)	5
**James Wattana (THA)**	**10**
**Ian Graham (ENG)**	**10**
Eddie Sinclair (SCO)	3
Jim Wych (CAN)	w.d.
**Mark Rowing (ENG)**	w.o.
Warren King (AUS)	8
**Les Dodd (ENG)**	**10**
Steve Longworth (ENG)	6
**Steve Campbell (ENG)**	**10**
Ray Reardon (WAL)	8
**Andrew Cairns (ENG)**	**10**
**Nigel Gilbert (ENG)**	**10**
Tony Kearney (IRL)	6
Colin Roscoe (WAL)	6
**Barry Pinches (ENG)**	**10**
**Tony Chappel (WAL)**	**10**
Mario Morra (CAN)	8
**Gary Wilkinson (ENG)**	**10**
Marcel Gauvreau (CAN)	5
Dave Martin (ENG)	6
**Robert Marshall (ENG)**	**10**
**Danny Fowler (ENG)**	**10**
Gino Rigitano (CAN)	6
**Dave Gilbert (ENG)**	**10**
Robbie Grace (RSA)	9
**Alain Robidoux (CAN)**	**10**
Craig Edwards (ENG)	3
**Ray Edmonds (ENG)**	**10**
Bob Harris (ENG)	4
**Jim Chambers (ENG)**	**10**
Jim Bear (CAN)	3
Roger Bales (ENG)	7
**Graham Miles (ENG)**	**10**
Tommy Murphy (NIR)	7
**John Rea (SCO)**	**10**
**Darren Morgan (WAL)**	**10**
Martin Smith (ENG)	6
Mick Fisher (ENG)	7
**Paul Watchorn (IRL)**	**10**
Tony Jones (ENG)	2
**Nigel Bond (ENG)**	**10**
Jack McLaughlin (NIR)	5
**Pat Houlihan (ENG)**	**10**
Graham Cripsey (ENG)	6
**Tony Wilson (IOM)**	**10**
Kirk Stevens (CAN)	6
**Brady Gollan (CAN)**	**10**
Joe O'Boye (ENG)	2
**Brian Morgan (ENG)**	**10**
**Mark Johnston-Allen (ENG)**	**10**
Nick Terry (ENG)	1
**Paddy Browne (IRL)**	**10**
Ian Brumby (ENG)	6
**Mark Bennett (WAL)**	**10**
Eric Lawlor (ENG)	3
**Murdo MacLeod (SCO)**	**10**
Nick Dyson (ENG)	9

**Fourth qualifying round** Best of 19 frames
**Mick Price (ENG)**	**10**
John Campbell (AUS)	5
John Spencer (ENG)	8
**James Wattana (THA)**	**10**
**Ian Graham (ENG)**	**10**
Mark Rowing (ENG)	8
Les Dodd (ENG)	7
**Steve Campbell (ENG)**	**10**
Andrew Cairns (ENG)	6
**Nigel Gilbert (ENG)**	**10**
Barry Pinches (ENG)	3
**Tony Chappel (WAL)**	**10**
**Gary Wilkinson (ENG)**	**10**
Robert Marshall (ENG)	7
**Danny Fowler (ENG)**	**10**
Dave Gilbert (ENG)	3
**Alain Robidoux (CAN)**	**10**
Ray Edmonds (ENG)	6
**Jim Chambers (ENG)**	**10**
Graham Miles (ENG)	5
John Rea (SCO)	7
**Darren Morgan (WAL)**	**10**
Paul Watchorn (IRL)	2
**Nigel Bond (ENG)**	**10**
Pat Houlihan (ENG)	6
**Tony Wilson (IOM)**	**10**
**Brady Gollan (CAN)**	**10**
Brian Morgan (ENG)	6
**Mark Johnston-Allen (ENG)**	**10**
Paddy Browne (IRL)	2
**Mark Bennett (WAL)**	**10**
Murdo MacLeod (SCO)	1

**Fifth qualifying round** Best of 19 frames
**Eddie Charlton (AUS)**	**10**
Mick Price (ENG)	5
**Alex Higgins (NIR)**	**10**
James Wattana (THA)	6
**Tony Drago (MLT)**	**10**
Ian Graham (ENG)	7
**Neal Foulds (ENG)**	**10**
Steve Campbell (ENG)	7
David Roe (ENG)	6
**Nigel Gilbert (ENG)**	**10**
Martin Clark (ENG)	9
**Tony Chappel (WAL)**	**10**
Silvino Francisco (RSA)	7
**Gary Wilkinson (ENG)**	**10**
Barry West (ENG)	9
**Danny Fowler (ENG)**	**10**
Dene O'Kane (NZL)	2
**Alain Robidoux (CAN)**	**10**
**Wayne Jones (WAL)**	**10**
Jim Chambers (ENG)	6
Bob Chaperon (CAN)	9
Darren Morgan (WAL)	**10**
**Steve Newbury (ENG)**	**10**
Nigel Bond (ENG)	6
**Cliff Wilson (WAL)**	**10**
Tony Wilson (IOM)	6
Eugene Hughes (IRL)	7
**Brady Gollan (CAN)**	**10**
**Peter Francisco (RSA)**	**10**
Mark Johnston-Allen (ENG)	7
Rex Williams (ENG)	9
**Mark Bennett (WAL)**	**10**

== Century breaks ==
There were 18 century breaks in the championship. The highest break was 140 made by John Parrott.

- 140 – John Parrott
- 135 – Steve James
- 131, 100 – Terry Griffiths
- 128 – Cliff Thorburn
- 118, 117, 112 – Steve Davis
- 117, 108, 108, 106, 104, 103 – Stephen Hendry
- 109 – Willie Thorne
- 105 – Jimmy White
- 104 – Darren Morgan
- 102 – Tony Drago

=== Qualifying stages ===
There were 22 century breaks in the qualifying stages; the highest, 135, was made by Nigel Gilbert in his fifth round defeat of David Roe.

- 135, 131 – Nigel Gilbert
- 133 – Neal Foulds
- 131, 105 – Mick Price
- 126, 109, 101 – Mark Johnston-Allen
- 123 – Danny Fowler
- 120 – Ray Reardon
- 117 – Tony Chappel
- 113 – Brian Morgan
- 111 – Ken Owers
- 110, 110, 106, 101 – Alain Robidoux
- 110 – Robert Marshall
- 107 – Tony Kearney
- 105 – Nigel Bond
- 104 – Steve Duggan
- 100 – Tommy Murphy
