= 1985 Pot Black =

Pot Black 85
Tournament information
- Dates: December 1984 (broadcast weekly 8 January – 9 April 1985)
- Venue: Pebble Mill Studios
- City: Birmingham
- Country: England
- Organisation: WPBSA
- Format: Non-Ranking event
- Highest break: (England) Jimmy White (80)

Final
- Champion: (Wales) Doug Mountjoy
- Runner-up: (England) Jimmy White
- Score: 2–0

The 1985 Pot Black was the seventeenth edition of the professional invitational snooker tournament, which took place in December 1984 but was broadcast in 1985. The tournament was held at Pebble Mill Studios in Birmingham, and featured sixteen professional players in a knock-out system. All matches until the semi-final were one-frame shoot-outs, the semi-final was aggregate score of two frames and the final being contested over the best of three frames.

Broadcasts were on BBC2 and started at 21:00 on Tuesday 8 January 1985 David Icke took over from Alan Weeks as presenter with Ted Lowe remaining as commentator and John Williams as referee.

The 16 players competing were all the last 16 players from the 1984 World Snooker Championship. Debuts include John Parrott and Neal Foulds who previously played in Junior Pot Black and Bill Werbeniuk. Doug Mountjoy won the event, his thirteenth professional title, beating Jimmy White 2–0 in the final. This was also Mountjoy's second Pot Black title; previously, he had won the 1978 edition.

== Main draw ==
Last 16
(England) Jimmy White	1
(England) John Parrott	0
(England) Steve Davis	1
(England) John Spencer	0
(Canada) Cliff Thorburn	72
(England) David Taylor	45
(England) Willie Thorne	1
(Australia) Eddie Charlton	0
(Northern Ireland) Dennis Taylor	79
(Canada) Bill Werbeniuk	56
(Wales) Terry Griffiths	1
(South Africa) Silvino Francisco	0
(England) Neal Foulds	1
(Wales) Ray Reardon	0
(Wales) Doug Mountjoy	110
(Canada) Kirk Stevens	16

Quarter-finals
(England) Jimmy White	1
(England) Steve Davis	0
(Canada) Cliff Thorburn	1
(England) Willie Thorne	0
(Northern Ireland) Dennis Taylor	1
(Wales) Terry Griffiths	0
(England) Neal Foulds	0
(Wales) Doug Mountjoy	1

Semi-finals; Aggregate score of 2 frames
(England) Jimmy White	1
(Canada) Cliff Thorburn	0
(Northern Ireland) Dennis Taylor	0
(Wales) Doug Mountjoy	1

Final; Best of 3 frames
(England) Jimmy White	0
(Wales) Doug Mountjoy	2

Match dates of transmission

Player 1	Player 2	Broadcast Date
(Wales) Doug Mountjoy	(Canada) Kirk Stevens	8 January 1985
(Canada) Cliff Thorburn	(England) David Taylor	15 January 1985
(Northern Ireland) Dennis Taylor	(Canada) Bill Werbeniuk	22 January 1985
(England) Jimmy White	(England) John Parrott	29 January 1985
(England) Neal Foulds	(Wales) Ray Reardon	5 February 1985
(England) Willie Thorne	(Australia) Eddie Charlton	12 February 1985
(Wales) Terry Griffiths	(South Africa) Silvino Francisco	19 February 1985
(England) Steve Davis	(England) John Spencer	26 February 1985
(Wales) Doug Mountjoy	(England) Neal Foulds	5 March 1985
(Canada) Cliff Thorburn	(England) Willie Thorne	12 March 1985
(Northern Ireland) Dennis Taylor	(Wales) Terry Griffiths	19 March 1985
(England) Jimmy White	(England) Steve Davis	26 March 1985
(Wales) Doug Mountjoy	(Northern Ireland) Dennis Taylor	2 April 1985
(England) Jimmy White	(England) Cliff Thorburn	3 April 1985
(Wales) Doug Mountjoy	(England) Jimmy White	9 April 1985

== Final ==
Final: Best of 3 frames. Pebble Mill Studios, Birmingham, England, 20 December 1984 (Broadcast 9 April 1985).
Doug Mountjoy; Wales	2–0	Jimmy White; England
