= 1979 Irish Masters =

Irish Masters
Tournament information
- Dates: 1–3 February 1979
- Venue: Goffs
- City: Kill
- Country: Ireland
- Organisation: WPBSA
- Format: Non-Ranking event
- Total prize fund: £6,000
- Winner's share: £2,000
- Highest break: John Spencer (ENG) (121)

Final
- Champion: (Wales) Doug Mountjoy
- Runner-up: (Wales) Ray Reardon
- Score: 6–5

The 1979 Irish Masters was the fifth edition of the professional invitational snooker tournament, which took place from 1 to 3 February 1979. The tournament was played at Goffs in Kill, County Kildare, and featured six professional players. Spencer, Mountjoy and Fagan played in Group A, Reardon, Higgins and Thorburn in Group B.

Doug Mountjoy won the title for the first time, beating Ray Reardon 6–5 in the final.

== Main draw ==
Semi-finals; Best of 5 frames		Final; Best of 11 frames
(Wales) Doug Mountjoy	3
(Northern Ireland) Alex Higgins	1	(Wales) Doug Mountjoy	6
(Wales) Ray Reardon	3	(Wales) Ray Reardon	5
(England) John Spencer	2
