= 1985 Welsh Professional Championship =

Welsh Professional Championship
Tournament information
- Dates: 7–11 May 1985
- Venue: Abertillery Leisure Centre
- City: Abertillery
- Country: Wales
- Organisation: WPBSA
- Format: Non-ranking event
- Winner's share: £6,000

Final
- Champion: Terry Griffiths
- Runner-up: Doug Mountjoy
- Score: 9–4

The 1985 BCE Welsh Professional Championship was a professional non-ranking snooker tournament, which took place in May 1985.

Terry Griffiths won the tournament defeating Doug Mountjoy 9–4 in the final.

== Main draw ==
Last 16; Best of 11 frames
Tony Chappel | 6
Marcus Owen | 0
Steve Newbury | 6
Wayne Jones | 2

Quarter-finals; Best of 11 frames
Terry Griffiths | 6
Tony Chappel | 0
Ray Reardon | 6
Clive Everton | 2
Doug Mountjoy | 6
Steve Newbury | 5
Cliff Wilson | 6
Colin Roscoe | 3

Semi-finals; Best of 17 frames
Terry Griffiths | 9
Ray Reardon | 3
Doug Mountjoy | 9
Cliff Wilson | 2

Final; Best of 17 frames
Terry Griffiths | 9
Doug Mountjoy | 4
