= 1983 Pontins Professional =

Tournament information
- Dates: 7–14 May 1983
- Venue: Pontin's
- City: Prestatyn
- Country: Wales
- Organisation: WPBSA
- Format: Non-Ranking event

Final
- Champion: (Wales) Doug Mountjoy
- Runner-up: (Wales) Ray Reardon
- Score: 9–7

The 1983 Pontins Professional was the tenth edition of the professional invitational snooker tournament which took place in May 1983 in Prestatyn, Wales.

The tournament featured six professional players. Two players were eliminated in the group stage, with the other four advancing to the semi-finals. All frames were played in the group stage matches even when the result had already been decided.

Doug Mountjoy won the event, beating Ray Reardon 9–7 in the final.

== Group stage ==
- (Wales) Doug Mountjoy 7–2 Tony Knowles (England)
- (Wales) Doug Mountjoy 7–2 Dennis Taylor (Northern Ireland)
- (Wales) Ray Reardon 5–4 Willie Thorne (England)
- (Wales) Ray Reardon 6–3 Terry Griffiths (Wales)
- (Northern Ireland) Dennis Taylor 5–3 Tony Knowles (England)
- (England) Willie Thorne 5–3 Terry Griffiths (Wales)

== Knockout stage ==
Semi-finals; Best of 9 frames
(Wales) Doug Mountjoy	5
(England) Willie Thorne	4
(Wales) Ray Reardon	5
(Northern Ireland) Dennis Taylor	2

Final; Best of 17 frames
(Wales) Doug Mountjoy	9
(Wales) Ray Reardon	7
