= 1983 Hong Kong Masters =

Hong Kong Masters
Tournament information
- Dates: 5–7 August 1983
- Venue: Queen Elizabeth Stadium
- Country: Hong Kong
- Organisation: WPBSA
- Format: Non-ranking event
- Highest break: 140, (Wales) Terry Griffiths

Final
- Champion: (Wales) Doug Mountjoy
- Runner-up: (Wales) Terry Griffiths
- Score: 4–3

The 1983 Camus Hong Kong Masters was a professional non-ranking snooker tournament that took place between 5 and 7 August 1983 at the Queen Elizabeth Stadium in Hong Kong.

Doug Mountjoy won the tournament, defeating Terry Griffiths 4–3 in the final. Griffiths compiled the tournament's highest break, 140, in the sixth frame of the final. Mountjoy commented that although he was pleased to win and hoped it would build his confidence, the event "doesn't mean much in comparison with the British tournaments".

== Main draw ==
Quarter-finals; Best of 3 frames
(Wales) Doug Mountjoy | 2
(Hong Kong) Cheun Chi-Ming | 1
(England) Tony Meo | 2
(Hong Kong) Stanley Leung | 1

Semi-finals; Best of 5 frames
(Wales) Doug Mountjoy | 3
(England) Steve Davis | 0
(Wales) Terry Griffiths | 3
(England) Tony Meo | 2

Final; Best of 7 frames
(Wales) Doug Mountjoy | 4
(Wales) Terry Griffiths | 3
