= 1983 Welsh Professional Championship =

Welsh Professional Championship
Tournament information
- Dates: 16–20 February 1983
- Venue: Ebbw Vale Leisure Centre
- City: Ebbw Vale
- Country: Wales
- Organisation: WPBSA
- Format: Non-ranking event
- Total prize fund: £13,500
- Winner's share: £6,000
- Highest break: Cliff Wilson (93)

Final
- Champion: Ray Reardon
- Runner-up: Doug Mountjoy
- Score: 9–1

The 1983 Woodpecker Welsh Professional Championship was a professional non-ranking snooker tournament, which took place between 16 and 20 February 1983 at the Ebbw Vale Leisure Centre in Ebbw Vale, Wales.

Ray Reardon won the tournament defeating Doug Mountjoy 9–1 in the final.

== Prize fund ==
The breakdown of prize money for this year is shown below:

- Winner: £6,000
- Runner-up: £3,000
- Semi-final: £1,700
- Quarter-final: £150
- Highest break: £500
- Total: £13,500

== Main draw ==
Quarter-finals; Best of 11 frames
Ray Reardon	6
Roy Andrewartha	2
Terry Griffiths	6
Clive Everton	1
Doug Mountjoy	6
Marcus Owen	0
Cliff Wilson	6
Colin Roscoe	4

Semi-finals; Best of 17 frames
Ray Reardon	9
Terry Griffiths	4
Doug Mountjoy	9
Cliff Wilson	3

Final; Best of 17 frames
Ray Reardon	9
Doug Mountjoy	1
