= 1979 Pot Black =

Tournament information
- Dates: Recorded late Dec 1978 (broadcast 29 December 1978 – 6 April 1979)
- Venue: Pebble Mill Studios
- City: Birmingham
- Country: England
- Format: Non-ranking event
- Winner's share: £1000
- Highest break: (Wales) Doug Mountjoy (82)

Final
- Champion: (Wales) Ray Reardon
- Runner-up: (Wales) Doug Mountjoy
- Score: 2–1

The 1979 Pot Black was a professional invitational snooker tournament, which was held in the Pebble Mill Studios in Birmingham. 8 players were competing in 2 four player groups. All matches were one-frame shoot-outs except the final which was played in the best of 3 frames on a one-hour programme.

Broadcasts were on BBC2 and started at 21:00 on Friday 29 December 1978 Alan Weeks presented the programme with Ted Lowe as commentator and Sydney Lee as referee.

This tournament had the TV debut of Steve Davis who played veteran namesake Fred Davis on the programme transmitted 19 January and won the frame 83-23 but failed to reach the semi-finals. The first Pot Black champion Ray Reardon regained the title 10 years after his first beating reigning champion Doug Mountjoy 2–1.

== Main draw ==
=== Group 1 ===
Player 1	Score	Player 2	Broadcast Date
(Wales) Ray Reardon	1–0	(England) John Spencer	29 December 1978
(Australia) Eddie Charlton	0–1	(England) Graham Miles	12 January 1979
(Wales) Ray Reardon	1–0	(Australia) Eddie Charlton	26 January 1979
(England) John Spencer	0–1	(England) Graham Miles	9 February 1979
(Wales) Ray Reardon	0–1	(England) Graham Miles	23 February 1979
(England) John Spencer	0–1	(Australia) Eddie Charlton	9 March 1979

=== Group 2 ===
Player 1	Score	Player 2	Broadcast Date
(Wales) Doug Mountjoy	0–1	(South Africa) Perrie Mans	5 January 1979
(England) Fred Davis	23–83	(England) Steve Davis	19 January 1979
(South Africa) Perrie Mans	1–0	(England) Fred Davis	2 February 1979
(Wales) Doug Mountjoy	97–26	(England) Steve Davis	16 February 1979
(South Africa) Perrie Mans	60–45	(England) Steve Davis	2 March 1979
(Wales) Doug Mountjoy	1–0	(England) Fred Davis	16 March 1979

=== Knockout stage ===
Semi-finals (23 and 30 March 1979)
(England) Graham Miles	0
(Wales) Doug Mountjoy	1
(Wales) Ray Reardon	1
(South Africa) Perrie Mans	0

Final (6 April 1979)
(Wales) Ray Reardon	2
(Wales) Doug Mountjoy	1
