= Doug Mountjoy =

Welsh snooker player (1942–2021)

Personal information
- Born: 8 June 1942 Tir-y-Berth, Gelligaer, Wales
- Died: 14 February 2021 (aged 78)

Sport
- Country: Wales
- Sport: Snooker
- Professional: 1976–1997
- Highest ranking: 5 (1990–91)

Tournament wins
- Ranking: 2

Douglas James Mountjoy (8 June 1942 – 14 February 2021) was a Welsh snooker player. He was a member of the professional snooker circuit from the late 1970s and throughout the 1980s, and remained within the top 16 of the world rankings for 11 consecutive years. He began his professional snooker career by taking the 1977 Masters, which he entered as a reserve player. He won both the 1978 UK Championship and the 1979 Irish Masters. Mountjoy reached the final of the 1981 World Snooker Championship where he was defeated by Steve Davis. He was also runner-up at the 1985 Masters losing to Cliff Thorburn, but by 1988 he had dropped out of the top 16.

Mountjoy enjoyed a resurgence in his 40s, and at the age of 46 he defeated Stephen Hendry in the final of the 1988 UK Championship. He followed up by also winning the next ranking event, the 1989 Classic, and by the end of the 1988–89 season he was back in the top 16, where he remained until 1992. His world ranking peaked at number five in 1990–1991. He also won five Welsh Professional Championship titles during his career.

Diagnosed with lung cancer in 1993, Mountjoy qualified for the World Championship at the age of 50, just weeks before having a lung surgically removed. He continued to play professionally until 1997, and he was coach to the United Arab Emirates snooker association between 1997 and 1999 and appeared sporadically at the World Snooker Championship until 2002. Mountjoy died in February 2021 after a stroke.

== Early life ==
Mountjoy was born on 8 June 1942, in Tir-y-Berth, Gelligaer, Glamorgan, Wales. He was brought up just outside Ebbw Vale and worked for some years as a coal miner, playing snooker in his spare time. At the age of 17 an underground accident trapped him for several hours when the roof collapsed; he was fortunate to escape.

A popular player in the South Wales Valleys as a junior, he won many amateur tournaments including two Welsh Amateur titles and the World Amateur title in 1976, after defeating Paul Mifsud 11–1. After the World Amateur victory he turned professional at the age of 34.

== Career ==
Mountjoy's first professional tournament, which he entered as a late replacement, was the 1977 Masters at the New London Theatre. After defeating former world champions John Pulman, Fred Davis, and Alex Higgins to reach the final, he beat the defending Masters champion and reigning world champion Ray Reardon 7–6 to win the title.

At the 1977 World Championship a couple of months later, he defeated Higgins again in the first round but lost to Dennis Taylor in the quarter-final 11–13. At the end of 1977, he reached the final of the first UK Snooker Championship, losing to Patsy Fagan 9–12. He won the title at the 1978 UK Championship, however, beating David Taylor 15–9, and he defeated Ray Reardon in the same season to win the Irish Masters 6–5. He won the 1980 Champion of Champions, with a 10–8 victory over John Virgo in the final. Mountjoy also won the 1978 Pot Black event.

After being part of the winning Wales team in the first two snooker World Challenge Cups, in 1979 and 1980, and winning the 1980 Welsh Professional Championship he had an attack of Bell's palsy which partially paralysed his face. Recovering from the attack, he reached the final of the 1981 World Championship, defeating Eddie Charlton, Dennis Taylor and, in the semi-final, Ray Reardon (against whom he made a 145 break, a championship record at the time). He then played Steve Davis in the final. Davis was favourite to win his first world title, and appeared to be racing to an easy victory by winning the first six frames of the match. However, Mountjoy recovered and came close to drawing level on several occasions. Trailing 11–13, and with the score at 60–63 in the 25th frame, he looked certain to cut Davis's lead to one frame but missed a simple blue from its spot; Davis went on to clear the colours, fluking the final black. Mountjoy won only one more frame as Davis won the match 18–12.

After that run at the World Championship, he had only a short run of titles; he won the Welsh Professional Championship in 1982 and 1984 to go with his 1980 title. He was back in the final of a major again in the 1985 Masters tournament, losing to Cliff Thorburn 9–6. Mountjoy also reclaimed the Pot Black title in March that year.

He won another Welsh title in 1987 but otherwise struggled to regain his previous form, including a 1–9 defeat to Steve Longworth in the first round of the 1986 UK Championship. By 1988 he was out of the top 16 in the world rankings. In the 1988–89 snooker season, however, he reached the final of the 1988 UK Championship where he met Stephen Hendry. He won 16–12 and gained his first ranking tournament victory, having at one stage scored centuries in three consecutive frames. In January 1989 he won the Classic, beating fellow Welshman Wayne Jones in the final, to win consecutive ranking titles. This was enough for him to return to the top 16 the next season, and by 1990 he was number five in the world. He remained in the top 16 until 1992.

Mountjoy was diagnosed with lung cancer in 1993, having been a smoker for many years. That year, at the age of 50, he defeated Alain Robidoux 10–6 in the first round of the World Championship, only weeks before an operation to remove his left lung. This was his last appearance in the final stages of the championship and for fifteen years he was the last player aged over 50 to appear at The Crucible. He survived the cancer and continued to play snooker until 1997, after which he concentrated on snooker coaching. He would coach in the United Arab Emirates, but did appear in qualifying for the 2002 World Snooker Championship.

== Personal life and death ==
He married Mary (née Richards), a hairdresser and the couple had two children. He died on 14 February 2021, aged 78, following a stroke.

In a joint statement, World Snooker chairman Barry Hearn and World Professional Billiards and Snooker Association chairman Jason Ferguson said: "Doug was first and foremost a lovely man, who had great friendships with many players on the tour throughout the 1970s and onwards."

== Performance and rankings timeline ==
Tournament	1976/ 77	1977/ 78	1978/ 79	1979/ 80	1980/ 81	1981/ 82	1982/ 83	1983/ 84	1984/ 85	1985/ 86	1986/ 87	1987/ 88	1988/ 89	1989/ 90	1990/ 91	1991/ 92	1992/ 93	1993/ 94	1994/ 95	1995/ 96	1996/ 97
Ranking	(Note: New players on the Main Tour do not have a ranking.)	14	14	13	14	6	7	12	15	15	14	14	24	10	5	10	26	30	26	36	59
Ranking tournaments
Asian Classic (Note: The event was also called the Dubai Masters (1988/1989), Dubai Classic (1989/90–1994/1995) and Thailand Classic (1995/1996))	Tournament Not Held												NR	F	QF	1R	2R	WD	LQ	LQ	LQ
Grand Prix (Note: The event was also called the Professional Players Tournament (1982/83–1983/1984))	Tournament Not Held						1R	1R	QF	2R	3R	1R	3R	QF	1R	2R	1R	1R	2R	1R	LQ
UK Championship	NH	Non-Ranking Event							2R	2R	2R	1R	W	1R	2R	1R	2R	2R	1R	1R	LQ
German Open	Tournament Not Held																			LQ	LQ
Welsh Open	Tournament Not Held															1R	2R	1R	1R	LQ	1R
International Open (Note: The event was also called the Goya Matchroom Trophy (1985/1986))	Tournament Not Held					NR	1R	QF	1R	2R	2R	1R	2R	1R	Not Held		1R	1R	1R	LQ	LQ
European Open	Tournament Not Held												3R	QF	QF	2R	3R	LQ	1R	LQ	LQ
Thailand Open (Note: The event was also called the Thailand Masters (1983/1984–1986/1987 & 1991/1992) and the Asian Open (1989/1990–1992/1993))	Tournament Not Held							Non-Ranking Event				Not Held		3R	3R	1R	1R	LQ	1R	LQ	LQ
British Open (Note: The event was also called the British Gold Cup (1979/1980), Yamaha Organs Trophy (1980/1981) and International Masters (1981/1982–1983/1984))	Not Held			Non-Ranking Event					1R	1R	3R	1R	3R	3R	2R	QF	1R	QF	1R	LQ	LQ
World Championship	QF	1R	1R	2R	F	2R	2R	QF	2R	2R	2R	2R	1R	2R	1R	1R	2R	LQ	LQ	LQ	LQ
Non-ranking tournaments
Scottish Masters	Tournament Not Held					QF	A	A	A	A	A	A	NH	A	QF	A	A	A	A	A	A
The Masters	W	QF	SF	A	QF	QF	SF	1R	F	1R	QF	1R	A	QF	1R	1R	LQ	LQ	A	A	A
Seniors Pot Black	Tournament Not Held																				QF
Irish Masters (Note: The event was also called the Benson & Hedges Ireland Tournament (1974/1975–1976/1977))	A	F	W	F	QF	QF	QF	A	A	A	A	A	A	1R	1R	A	A	A	A	A	A
Pontins Professional	RR	RR	W	A	SF	SF	W	QF	A	A	A	A	QF	A	SF	SF	A	A	A	A	A
European League (Note: The event was also called the Professional Snooker League (1983/1984) and the Matchroom League (1986/1987 to 1991/1992))	Tournament Not Held							RR	Not Held		A	A	A	RR	RR	A	A	A	A	A	A
Former ranking tournaments
Canadian Masters (Note: The event was also called the Canadian Open (1978/1979–1980/1981))	Non-Ranking Event					Tournament Not Held				Non-Ranking			2R	Tournament Not Held							
Hong Kong Open (Note: The event was also called the Australian Masters (1979/1980–1987/1988 & 1995/1996) and Australian Open (1994/1995))	Not Held			Non-Ranking Event									NH	3R	Tournament Not Held				NR		NH
Classic	Not Held			Non-Ranking Event				1R	1R	SF	1R	2R	W	1R	2R	1R	Tournament Not Held				
Strachan Open	Tournament Not Held															1R	MR	NR	Not Held		
Former non-ranking tournaments
Canadian Masters	A	1R	A	A	A	Tournament Not Held				A	A	A	R	Tournament Not Held							
Holsten Lager International	Not Held		1R	Tournament Not Held																	
Forward Chemicals Tournament	Not Held		RR	Tournament Not Held																	
Golden Masters	NH	W	SF	Tournament Not Held																	
Padmore Super Crystalate	Not Held			QF	Tournament Not Held																
Bombay International	Not Held		A	RR	Tournament Not Held																
Pontins Camber Sands	Not Held			SF	Tournament Not Held																
Champion of Champions	Not Held		SF	NH	W	Tournament Not Held															
International Open	Tournament Not Held					2R	Ranking Event								Not Held		Ranking Event				
Northern Ireland Classic	Tournament Not Held					SF	Tournament Not Held														
Classic	Not Held			QF	A	A	QF	Ranking Event									Tournament Not Held				
Tolly Cobbold Classic	Not Held		RR	A	A	A	QF	A	Tournament Not Held												
Thailand Masters	Tournament Not Held							SF	A	A	A	Not Held		Ranking Event							
UK Championship	NH	F	W	2R	1R	2R	2R	2R	Ranking Event												
British Open	Not Held			RR	RR	RR	2R	RR	Ranking Event												
New Zealand Masters	Tournament Not Held							F	QF	Not Held			A	A	Tournament Not Held						
Australian Masters (Note: The event was also called the Hong Kong Open (1989/1990) and Australian Open (1994/1995))	Not Held			A	A	A	A	1R	1R	A	A	A	NH	R	Tournament Not Held				A	A	NH
Norwich Union Grand Prix	Tournament Not Held													QF	Tournament Not Held						
Welsh Professional Championship	F	Not Held		W	SF	W	F	W	F	F	W	SF	W	F	A	Tournament Not Held					
Hong Kong Challenge (Note: The event was also called the Hong Kong Masters (1983/1984–1988/1989))	Tournament Not Held							W	F	A	A	A	A	NH	QF	A	Tournament Not Held				
Belgian Masters	Tournament Not Held														QF	A	A	Not Held		A	NH
Shoot-Out	Tournament Not Held														1R	Tournament Not Held					
World Matchplay	Tournament Not Held												A	QF	1R	A	A	Tournament Not Held			
World Masters	Tournament Not Held														1R	Tournament Not Held					
Pot Black	F	W	F	SF	A	SF	A	1R	W	1R	Tournament Not Held					SF	A	A	Not Held		
World Seniors Championship	Tournament Not Held															QF	Tournament Not Held				

Performance Table Legend
LQ	lost in the qualifying draw	#R	lost in the early rounds of the tournament (WR = Wildcard round, RR = Round robin)	QF	lost in the quarter-finals
SF	lost in the semi-finals	F	lost in the final	W	won the tournament
DNQ	did not qualify for the tournament	A	did not participate in the tournament	WD	withdrew from the tournament

NH / Not Held	means an event was not held.
NR / Non-Ranking Event	means an event is/was no longer a ranking event.
R / Ranking Event	means an event is/was a ranking event.

== Career finals ==
=== Ranking finals: 4 (2 titles) ===
Legend
World Championship (0–1)
UK Championship (1–0)
Other (1–1)

Outcome	No.	Year	Championship	Opponent in the final	Score	Ref
Runner-up	1.	1981	World Snooker Championship	(England) Steve Davis	12–18	
Winner	1.	1988	UK Championship (2)	(Scotland) Stephen Hendry	16–12	
Winner	2.	1989	The Classic	(Wales) Wayne Jones	13–11	
Runner-up	2.	1989	Dubai Classic	(Scotland) Stephen Hendry	2–9	

=== Non-ranking finals: 28 (15 titles) ===
Legend
UK Championship (1–1)
The Masters (1–1)
Other (13–11)

Outcome	No.	Year	Championship	Opponent in the final	Score	Ref
Runner-up	1.	1977	Pot Black	(South Africa) Perrie Mans	0–1	
Winner	1.	1977	The Masters	(Wales) Ray Reardon	7–6	
Runner-up	2.	1977	Welsh Professional Championship	(Wales) Ray Reardon	8–12	
Runner-up	3.	1977	UK Championship	(Republic of Ireland) Patsy Fagan	9–12	
Runner-up	4.	1978	Irish Masters	(England) John Spencer	3–5	
Winner	2.	1978	Pot Black	(England) Graham Miles	2–1	
Winner	3.	1978	Golden Masters	(Wales) Ray Reardon	4–2	
Winner	4.	1978	UK Championship	(England) David Taylor	15–9	
Runner-up	5.	1979	Pot Black	(Wales) Ray Reardon	1–2	
Winner	5.	1979	Irish Masters	(Wales) Ray Reardon	6–5	
Winner	6.	1979	Pontins Professional	(England) Graham Miles	8–4	
Winner	7.	1980	Welsh Professional Championship	(Wales) Ray Reardon	9–6	
Runner-up	6.	1980	Irish Masters	(Wales) Terry Griffiths	9–10	
Winner	8.	1980	Champion of Champions	(England) John Virgo	10–8	
Winner	9.	1982	Welsh Professional Championship (2)	(Wales) Terry Griffiths	9–8	
Runner-up	7.	1983	Welsh Professional Championship (2)	(Wales) Ray Reardon	1–9	
Winner	10.	1983	Pontins Professional (2)	(Wales) Ray Reardon	9–7	
Runner-up	8.	1983	New Zealand Masters	(Canada) Bill Werbeniuk	0–1	
Winner	11.	1983	Hong Kong Masters	(Wales) Terry Griffiths	4–3	
Winner	12.	1984	Welsh Professional Championship (3)	(Wales) Cliff Wilson	9–3	
Runner-up	9.	1984	Hong Kong Masters	(England) Steve Davis	2–4	
Runner-up	10.	1985	The Masters	(Canada) Cliff Thorburn	6–9	
Runner-up	11.	1985	Welsh Professional Championship (3)	(Wales) Terry Griffiths	4–9	
Winner	13.	1985	Pot Black (2)	(England) Jimmy White	2–0	
Runner-up	12.	1986	Welsh Professional Championship (4)	(Wales) Terry Griffiths	3–9	
Winner	14.	1987	Welsh Professional Championship (4)	(Wales) Steve Newbury	9–7	
Winner	15.	1989	Welsh Professional Championship (5)	(Wales) Terry Griffiths	9–6	
Runner-up	13.	1990	Welsh Professional Championship (5)	(Wales) Darren Morgan	7–9	

=== Pro-am finals: 4 (2 titles) ===
Outcome	No.	Year	Championship	Opponent in the final	Score	Ref
Winner	1.	1974	Pontins Spring Open	(England) John Spencer	7–4	
Winner	2.	1976	Pontins Spring Open (2)	(England) Lance Pibworth	7–1	
Runner-up	1.	1977	Warners Open	(England) Tony Meo	4–5	
Runner-up	2.	1984	Pontins Spring Open	(England) Neal Foulds	4–7	

=== Team finals: 5 (2 titles) ===
Outcome	No.	Year	Championship	Team/partner	Opponent(s) in the final	Score	Ref
Winner	1.	1979	World Challenge Cup	Wales	England	14–3	
Winner	1.	1980	World Challenge Cup (2)	Wales	Canada	8–5	
Runner-up	1.	1981	World Team Classic	Wales	England	3–4	
Runner-up	2.	1982	World Doubles Championship	(Wales) Terry Griffiths	(England) Steve Davis (England) Tony Meo	3–4	
Runner-up	3.	1983	World Team Classic (2)	Wales	England	2–4	

=== Amateur finals: 4 (3 titles) ===
Outcome	No.	Year	Championship	Opponent in the final	Score	Ref
Runner-up	1.	1966	Welsh Amateur Championship	(Wales) Lynn O'Neill	5–9	
Winner	1.	1968	Welsh Amateur Championship	(Wales) John Terry	6–5	
Winner	2.	1976	Welsh Amateur Championship (2)	(Wales) Alwyn Lloyd	8–6	
Winner	3.	1976	World Amateur Championship	(Malta) Paul Mifsud	11–1	
