= 1980 Welsh Professional Championship =

Welsh Professional Championship
Tournament information
- Dates: 27–29 January 1980
- Venue: Ebbw Vale Leisure Centre
- City: Ebbw Vale
- Country: Wales
- Organisation: WPBSA
- Format: Non-ranking event
- Total prize fund: £5,000
- Winner's share: £2,250
- Highest break: Terry Griffiths (127)

Final
- Champion: Doug Mountjoy
- Runner-up: Ray Reardon
- Score: 9–6

The 1980 Woodpecker Welsh Professional Championship was a professional non-ranking snooker tournament, which took place between 27 and 29 January 1980 at the Ebbw Vale Leisure Centre in Ebbw Vale, Wales.

Doug Mountjoy won the tournament defeating Ray Reardon 9–6 in the final.

== Prize fund ==
The breakdown of prize money for this year is shown below:

- Winner: £2,250
- Runner-up: £1,250
- Semi-final: £750
- Total: £5,000

== Main draw ==
Best of 17 frames

Semi-finals; Best of 17 Frames
Doug Mountjoy	9
Terry Griffiths	6
Ray Reardon	9
Cliff Wilson	3

Final; Best of 17 Frames
Doug Mountjoy	9
Ray Reardon	6
