= 1984 Welsh Professional Championship =

Welsh Professional Championship
Tournament information
- Dates: 7–11 March 1984
- Venue: Ebbw Vale Leisure Centre
- City: Ebbw Vale
- Country: Wales
- Organisation: WPBSA
- Format: Non-ranking event
- Total prize fund: £15,000
- Winner's share: £6,500
- Highest break: Ray Reardon (104)

Final
- Champion: Doug Mountjoy
- Runner-up: Cliff Wilson
- Score: 9–3

The 1984 Strongbow Welsh Professional Championship was a professional non-ranking snooker tournament, which took place between 7 and 11 March 1984 at the Ebbw Vale Leisure Centre in Ebbw Vale, Wales.

Doug Mountjoy won the tournament, defeating Cliff Wilson 9–3 in the final.

== Main draw ==
Quarter-finals; Best of 11 frames
Doug Mountjoy	6
Clive Everton	1
Terry Griffiths	6
Roy Andrewartha	1
Cliff Wilson	6
Colin Roscoe	2
Ray Reardon	6
Marcus Owen	1

Semi-finals; Best of 17 frames
Doug Mountjoy	9
Terry Griffiths	5
Cliff Wilson	9
Ray Reardon	4

Final; Best of 17 frames
Doug Mountjoy	9
Cliff Wilson	3
