= 1982 Welsh Professional Championship =

Welsh Professional Championship
Tournament information
- Dates: 24–28 February 1982
- Venue: Ebbw Vale Leisure Centre
- City: Ebbw Vale
- Country: Wales
- Organisation: WPBSA
- Format: Non-ranking event
- Total prize fund: £12,000
- Winner's share: £5,000
- Highest break: Cliff Wilson (104)

Final
- Champion: Doug Mountjoy
- Runner-up: Terry Griffiths
- Score: 9–8

The 1982 Woodpecker Welsh Professional Championship was a professional non-ranking snooker tournament, which took place between 24 and 28 February 1982 at the Ebbw Vale Leisure Centre in Ebbw Vale, Wales.

Doug Mountjoy won the tournament defeating Terry Griffiths 9–8 in the final.

== Main draw ==
Quarter-finals; Best of 11 frames
Doug Mountjoy	6
Roy Andrewartha	3
Ray Reardon	6
Clive Everton	1
Terry Griffiths	6
Colin Roscoe	2
Cliff Wilson	6
Marcus Owen	0

Semi-finals; Best of 17 frames
Doug Mountjoy	9
Ray Reardon	7
Terry Griffiths	9
Cliff Wilson	6

Final; Best of 17 frames
Doug Mountjoy	9
Terry Griffiths	8
