= 1988 Canadian Masters =

Canadian Masters
Tournament information
- Dates: 26 October – 5 November 1988
- Venue: Minkler Auditorium
- City: Toronto
- Country: Canada
- Organisation: WPBSA
- Format: Ranking event
- Total prize fund: £200,000
- Winner's share: £40,000
- Highest break: Dennis Taylor (NIR) (132)

Final
- Champion: Jimmy White (ENG)
- Runner-up: Steve Davis (ENG)
- Score: 9–4

The 1988 BCE Canadian Masters was a professional ranking snooker tournament, that was held from 26 October to 5 November 1988 at the Minkler Auditorium, Toronto, Canada. This was the first and only year the event was held as a ranking event. All preliminary rounds were played in the UK and only the last 32 players travelled to Canada.

Jimmy White won the tournament by defeating Steve Davis nine frames to four in the final.

As of 2025 it remains the only ranking event to take place in North America.

== Main draw ==
Last 32; Best of 9 frames
(England) Steve Davis	5
(England) George Scott	1
(England) Steve James	5
(England) Joe Johnson	4
(Wales) Doug Mountjoy	5
(England) Willie Thorne	4
(Wales) Terry Griffiths	5
(Wales) Ray Reardon	2
(Canada) Cliff Thorburn	5
(England) John Spencer	2
(England) Ian Graham	5
(Australia) Eddie Charlton	2
(Wales) Cliff Wilson	5
(England) Dean Reynolds	4
(Scotland) Stephen Hendry	5
(England) Danny Fowler	2
(Australia) Warren King	5
(England) Steve Duggan	4
(England) Mike Hallett	5
(Canada) Marcel Gauvreau	3
(England) John Virgo	5
(Wales) Steve Newbury	2
(England) John Parrott	5
(Wales) Darren Morgan	3
(England) David Taylor	5
(Wales) Colin Roscoe	1
(Northern Ireland) Dennis Taylor	5
(England) Martin Clark	4
(England) Steve Longworth	5
(Scotland) Murdo MacLeod	3
(England) Jimmy White	5
(Wales) Mark Bennett	3

Last 16; Best of 9 frames
(England) Steve Davis	5
(England) Steve James	0
(Wales) Doug Mountjoy	4
(Wales) Terry Griffiths	5
(Canada) Cliff Thorburn	5
(England) Ian Graham	4
(Wales) Cliff Wilson	1
(Scotland) Stephen Hendry	5
(Australia) Warren King	2
(England) Mike Hallett	5
(England) John Virgo	4
(England) John Parrott	5
(England) David Taylor	2
(Northern Ireland) Dennis Taylor	5
(England) Steve Longworth	0
(England) Jimmy White	5

Quarter-finals; Best of 9 frames
(England) Steve Davis	5
(Wales) Terry Griffiths	3
(Canada) Cliff Thorburn	4
(Scotland) Stephen Hendry	5
(England) Mike Hallett	5
(England) John Parrott	3
(Northern Ireland) Dennis Taylor	3
(England) Jimmy White	5

Semi-finals; Best of 11 frames
(England) Steve Davis	9
(Scotland) Stephen Hendry	5
(England) Mike Hallett	2
(England) Jimmy White	9

Final; Best of 17 frames
(England) Steve Davis	4
(England) Jimmy White	9
