= 1989 Classic (snooker) =

Mercantile Credit Classic
Tournament information
- Dates: 1–15 January 1989
- Venue: Norbreck Castle Hotel
- City: Blackpool
- Country: England
- Organisation: WPBSA
- Format: Ranking event
- Total prize fund: £275,000
- Winner's share: £55,000
- Highest break: Nigel Gilbert (ENG) (143)

Final
- Champion: Doug Mountjoy (WAL)
- Runner-up: Wayne Jones (WAL)
- Score: 13–11

The 1989 Mercantile Credit Classic was the tenth edition of the professional snooker tournament which took place from 1–15 January 1989 with ITV coverage beginning on the 7th. The tournament was played at the Norbreck Castle Hotel, Blackpool, Lancashire.

Reigning UK Champion Doug Mountjoy won his second title in succession, beating Wayne Jones 13–11 in the final.

== Main draw ==
First Round; Best of 9 frames
(Wales) Tony Chappel	5
(England) Steve Davis	3
(England) Anthony Harris	5
(England) Barry West	4
(Republic of Ireland) Paddy Browne	5
(England) Mike Hallett	2
(England) Steve James	5
(England) Gary Wilkinson	1
(England) Nick Terry	5
(South Africa) Peter Francisco	4
(Wales) Doug Mountjoy	5
(England) Dennis Hughes	0
(England) Tony Knowles	5
(Wales) Colin Roscoe	4
(England) Dean Reynolds	5
(England) Steve Duggan	1
(Canada) Cliff Thorburn	5
(Australia) Glen Wilkinson	2
(England) Graham Cripsey	5
(England) Steve Longworth	3
(England) John Virgo	5
(England) Les Dodd	2
(Canada) Bob Chaperon	5
(Northern Ireland) Jack McLaughlin	3
(Northern Ireland) Dennis Taylor	5
(England) Danny Fowler	3
(Wales) Steve Newbury	5
(England) Malcolm Bradley	3
(Scotland) Stephen Hendry	5
(Northern Ireland) Tommy Murphy	2
(Wales) Ray Reardon	5
(Australia) Eddie Charlton	1
(England) Neal Foulds	5
(England) Dave Martin	1
(England) Martin Clark	5
(England) John Spencer	2
(England) Joe Johnson	5
(Republic of Ireland) Dessie Sheehan	2
(Northern Ireland) Alex Higgins	5
(Scotland) Murdo MacLeod	2
(England) Willie Thorne	5
(England) Jason Smith	1
(New Zealand) Dene O'Kane	'5
(England) Nigel Gilbert	2
(Wales) Terry Griffiths	5
(Australia) Warren King	2
(Malta) Tony Drago	5
(England) Robert Marshall	3
(England) John Parrott	5
(England) David Roe	2
(England) Jon Wright	5
(England) Rex Williams	0
(South Africa) Silvino Francisco	w/o
(Canada) Bill Werbeniuk	w/d
(England) Tony Meo	5
(Canada) Kirk Stevens	3
(Wales) Cliff Wilson	5
(England) Steve Campbell	3
(England) David Taylor	5
(England) Mike Darrington	2
(Wales) Wayne Jones	5
(England) Jimmy White	3
(Republic of Ireland) Eugene Hughes	5
(England) Graham Miles	2

Second Round; Best of 9 frames
(Wales) Tony Chappel	5
(England) Anthony Harris	1
(Republic of Ireland) Paddy Browne	5
(England) Steve James	4
(England) Nick Terry	4
(Wales) Doug Mountjoy	5
(England) Tony Knowles	5
(England) Dean Reynolds	4
(Canada) Cliff Thorburn	5
(England) Graham Cripsey	1
(England) John Virgo	5
(Canada) Bob Chaperon	1
(Northern Ireland) Dennis Taylor	4
(Wales) Steve Newbury	5
(Scotland) Stephen Hendry	5
(Wales) Ray Reardon	4
(England) Neal Foulds	4
(England) Martin Clark	5
(England) Joe Johnson	5
(Northern Ireland) Alex Higgins	0
(England) Willie Thorne	5
(New Zealand) Dene O'Kane	3
(Wales) Terry Griffiths	5
(Malta) Tony Drago	0
(England) John Parrott	5
(England) Jon Wright	2
(South Africa) Silvino Francisco	5
(England) Tony Meo	1
(Wales) Cliff Wilson	3
(England) David Taylor	5
(Wales) Wayne Jones	5
(Republic of Ireland) Eugene Hughes	1

Third Round; Best of 9 frames
(Wales) Tony Chappel	1
(Republic of Ireland) Paddy Browne	5
(Wales) Doug Mountjoy	5
(England) Tony Knowles	4
(Canada) Cliff Thorburn	5
(England) John Virgo	3
(Wales) Steve Newbury	1
(Scotland) Stephen Hendry	5
(England) Martin Clark	5
(England) Joe Johnson	3
(England) Willie Thorne	5
(Wales) Terry Griffiths	1
(England) John Parrott	5
(South Africa) Silvino Francisco	1
(England) David Taylor	3
(Wales) Wayne Jones	5

Quarter-finals; Best of 9 frames
(Republic of Ireland) Paddy Browne	3
(Wales) Doug Mountjoy	5
(Canada) Cliff Thorburn	5
(Scotland) Stephen Hendry	4
(England) Martin Clark	4
(England) Willie Thorne	5
(England) John Parrott	4
(Wales) Wayne Jones	5

Semi-finals; Best of 17 frames
(Wales) Doug Mountjoy	9
(Canada) Cliff Thorburn	5
(England) Willie Thorne	4
(Wales) Wayne Jones	9

Final; Best of 25 frames
(Wales) Doug Mountjoy	13
(Wales) Wayne Jones	11

== Final ==
Final: Best of 25 frames. Referee: Len Ganley. Norbreck Castle Hotel, Blackpool, England, 14 & 15 January 1989.
Doug Mountjoy; Wales	13–11	Wayne Jones; Wales
First session: 4–125 (52), 71–14, 49–35, 14–71, 58–46, 23–72, 31–58; Second session: 99–13 (58), 72–53, 33–71, 54–64, 96–0 (96), 50–63, 78–36 (56); Third session: 72–35, 46–56, 36–67 (52), 96–83 (74), 42–74, 11–82 (75), 114–12 (54, 60), 64–24, 81–8 (67), 71–11
96	Highest break	75
0	Century breaks	0
7	50+ breaks	3

== Century breaks ==
(Including qualifying rounds)

- 143 – Nigel Gilbert
- 138 – Tony Knowles
- 137 – Wayne Jones
- 134 – Willie Thorne
- 127 – Malcolm Bradley
- 127 – Marcel Gauvreau
- 121 – Graham Cripsey
- 121 – Jimmy White
- 116, 105 – Cliff Thorburn
- 109 – Tony Chappel
- 109 – Mark Johnston-Allen
- 104 – Les Dodd
- 105 – John Parrott
- 100 – Dene O'Kane
