= 1984 Hong Kong Masters =

Hong Kong Masters
Tournament information
- Dates: September 1984
- Venue: Queen Elizabeth Stadium
- Country: Hong Kong
- Organisation: WPBSA
- Format: Non-ranking event

Final
- Champion: (England) Steve Davis
- Runner-up: (Wales) Doug Mountjoy
- Score: 4–2

The 1984 Camus Hong Kong Masters was a professional non-ranking snooker tournament held in Hong Kong in September 1984.

Steve Davis won the tournament, defeating Doug Mountjoy 4–2 in the final.

== Main draw ==
Quarter-finals; Best of 5 frames
(England) Steve Davis	3
(Hong Kong) Kwong Wai Chuen	0
(England) Tony Meo	3
(England) John Parrott	0
(Wales) Doug Mountjoy	3
(Wales) Terry Griffiths	2
(Hong Kong) Gary Kwok	3
(England) Jimmy White	1

Semi-finals; Best of 5 frames
(England) Steve Davis	3
(England) Tony Meo	2
(Wales) Doug Mountjoy	3
(Hong Kong) Gary Kwok	0

Final; Best of 7 frames
(England) Steve Davis	4
(Wales) Doug Mountjoy	2
