= 1985 Masters (snooker) =

Professional non-ranking snooker tournament, Jan/Feb 1985

1985 Benson & Hedges Masters
Tournament information
- Dates: 27 January – 3 February 1985
- Venue: Wembley Conference Centre
- City: London
- Country: England
- Organisation: WPBSA
- Format: Non-ranking event
- Total prize fund: £150,000
- Winner's share: £37,500
- Highest break: Cliff Thorburn (CAN) (103)

Final
- Champion: Cliff Thorburn (CAN)
- Runner-up: Doug Mountjoy (WAL)
- Score: 9–6

The 1985 Masters (officially the 1985 Benson & Hedges Masters) was a professional non-ranking snooker tournament that took place between 27 January and 3 February 1985 at the Wembley Conference Centre in London, England. The highest break of the tournament was 103 made by Cliff Thorburn, for which Thorburn earned £3,750.

The top 16 ranked players took part in the competition. The first round match between Alex Higgins and Steve Davis on 30 January turned out to be one of the all-time greatest matches between the pair when Higgins won 5–4 in front of an ecstatic Wembley crowd. The final on 3 February gave Cliff Thorburn his second Masters title defeating Doug Mountjoy 9–6 in the final, and he became the second player to win two Masters titles.

== Field ==
Defending champion Jimmy White was the number 1 seed with World Champion Steve Davis seeded 2. The remaining places were allocated to the top 16 players in the world rankings. Willie Thorne was making his debut in the Masters.

== Main draw ==
Last 16; Best of 9 frames
1	Jimmy White (ENG)	5
12	Willie Thorne (ENG)	2
7	Eddie Charlton (AUS)	3
13	John Spencer (ENG)	5
6	Ray Reardon (WAL)	5
16	David Taylor (ENG)	1
4	Cliff Thorburn (CAN)	5
11	Dennis Taylor (NIR)	3
3	Tony Knowles (ENG)	3
15	Doug Mountjoy (WAL)	5
5	Kirk Stevens (CAN)	2
10	Tony Meo (ENG)	5
8	Terry Griffiths (WAL)	5
14	Bill Werbeniuk (CAN)	2
2	Steve Davis (ENG)	4
9	Alex Higgins (NIR)	5

Quarter-finals; Best of 9 frames
1	(England) Jimmy White	5
13	(England) John Spencer	2
6	(Wales) Ray Reardon	0
4	(Canada) Cliff Thorburn	5
15	(Wales) Doug Mountjoy	5
10	(England) Tony Meo	4
8	(Wales) Terry Griffiths	5
9	(Northern Ireland) Alex Higgins	1

Semi-finals; Best of 11 frames
1	(England) Jimmy White	4
4	(Canada) Cliff Thorburn	6
15	(Wales) Doug Mountjoy	6
8	(Wales) Terry Griffiths	2

Final; Best of 17 frames
4	(Canada) Cliff Thorburn	9
15	(Wales) Doug Mountjoy	6

=== Final ===
Final: Best of 17 frames. Referee: John Smyth; Wembley Conference Centre, London, England, 3 February 1985.
Cliff Thorburn; Canada	9–6	Doug Mountjoy; Wales
First session: 67–42, 20–72, 8–78, 60–48, 52–63, 94–0 (54), 53–45, 94–0 (60), 75–18, 62–73, 60–67, 93–58 (72), 83–49 (64), 42–64, 65–25
72	Highest break	
0	Century breaks	0
4	50+ breaks	0

== Century breaks ==
Total: 1

- 103 – Cliff Thorburn
