= 1978 Pot Black =

Tournament information
- Dates: Recorded late December 1977 (broadcast 6 January – 14 April 1978)
- Venue: Pebble Mill Studios
- City: Birmingham
- Country: England
- Format: Non-ranking event
- Winner's share: £1000
- Highest break: (Wales) Doug Mountjoy (101)

Final
- Champion: (Wales) Doug Mountjoy
- Runner-up: (England) Graham Miles
- Score: 2–1

The 1978 Pot Black was a professional invitational snooker tournament, which was held in the Pebble Mill Studios in Birmingham, and this year, the tournament returned to 8 players competing in 2 four player groups. All matches were one-frame shoot-outs but the final this year was played in the best of 3 frames on a one-hour programme.

Broadcasts were on BBC2 and started at 21:00 on Friday 6 January 1978 Alan Weeks presented the programme with Ted Lowe as commentator and Sydney Lee as referee.

The previous year's finalist Doug Mountjoy beat twice Pot Black Champion Graham Miles in the first final to have a best of 3 frames format 2–1.

== Main draw ==
The draw for the group stages was made by comedian Eric Morecambe and shown before the first match.

=== Group 1 ===
Player 1	Score	Player 2	Broadcast Date
(Wales) Doug Mountjoy	1–0	(Northern Ireland) Alex Higgins	6 January 1978
(Wales) Ray Reardon	1–0	(Northern Ireland) Dennis Taylor	20 January 1978
(Wales) Ray Reardon	1–0	(Wales) Doug Mountjoy	3 February 1978
(Northern Ireland) Alex Higgins	0–1	(Northern Ireland) Dennis Taylor	17 February 1978
(Wales) Ray Reardon	0–1	(Northern Ireland) Alex Higgins	3 March 1978
(Northern Ireland) Dennis Taylor	0–1	(Wales) Doug Mountjoy	17 March 1978

=== Group 2 ===
Player 1	Score	Player 2	Broadcast Date
(England) John Spencer	0–1	(Australia) Eddie Charlton	13 January 1978
(Canada) Cliff Thorburn	0–1	(England) Graham Miles	27 January 1978
(England) John Spencer	0–1	(England) Graham Miles	10 February 1978
(Australia) Eddie Charlton	1–0	(Canada) Cliff Thorburn	24 February 1978
(England) John Spencer	1–0	(Canada) Cliff Thorburn	10 March 1978
(England) Graham Miles	1–0	(Australia) Eddie Charlton	24 March 1978

=== Knockout stage ===
Semi-finals (31 March and 7 April 1978)
(Wales) Doug Mountjoy	1
(Australia) Eddie Charlton	0
(Wales) Ray Reardon	0
(England) Graham Miles	1

Final (14 April 1978)
(Wales) Doug Mountjoy	2
(England) Graham Miles	1
