= Newport Centre (Wales) =

Leisure centre in Newport, Wales

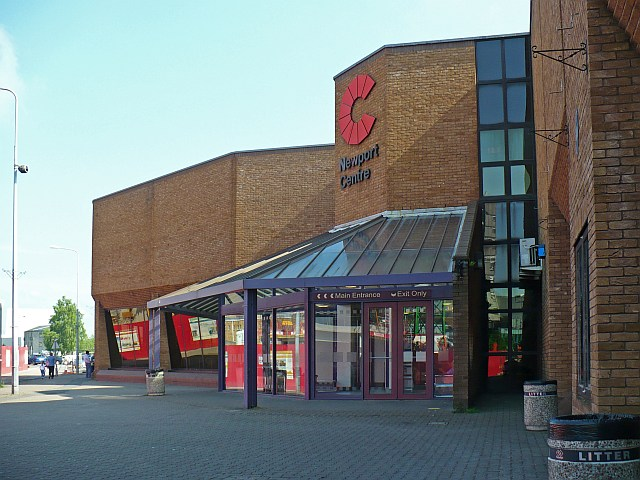
- Main entrance, 2008
- Interactive map of Newport Centre
- Location: Newport, South Wales
- Coordinates: 51°35′08.47″N 2°59′28.69″W
- Owner: Newport City Council
- Capacity: 2,000
- Type: Concert hall, leisure centre

Construction
- Opened: 1985
- Closed: 2023

Website
- Newport Centre

Newport Centre was a leisure centre in Newport, South Wales. Located in Newport city centre on the west bank of the River Usk adjacent to the Kingsway Shopping Centre, it included a pool and sports facilities as well as suites. Events including concerts, international business conferences and art exhibitions were held there. The centre opened in 1985 and closed in 2023, when it was demolished; Newport City Council plans to replace it with a new leisure centre nearby, without concert facilities.

== Facilities ==
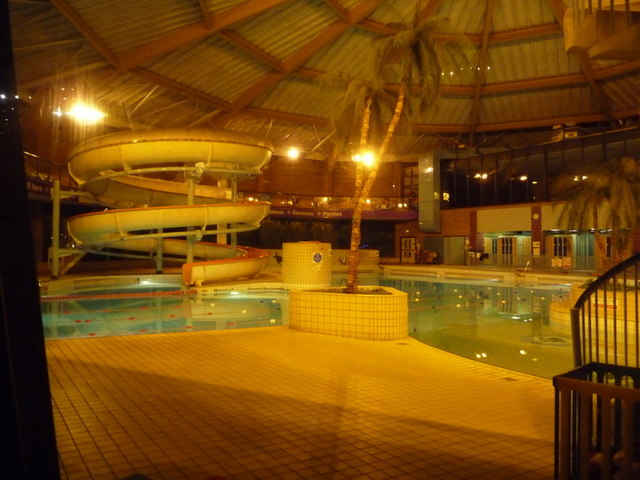
Swimming pool after hours, 2009

The centre had a leisure pool with flume and wave machine, and a multi-purpose sports hall with facilities for badminton, netball, tennis, basketball and volleyball. There was a fitness centre and health suite with a sauna, Jacuzzi and sun bed. Function rooms and an exhibition space were available for hire. There was a cafeteria and parking for 1,200 vehicles.

== Events ==
Newport Centre opened in 1985 and hosted performers including Elton John, David Bowie, Run DMC, Elvis Costello, Alice Cooper, Cinderella, The Black Crowes, Metallica, RATT, Manic Street Preachers, Robert Palmer, Iron Maiden, Ronnie James Dio, Kasabian and Marilyn Manson (in 1997 and 2017).

The centre also hosted snooker tournaments, the Welsh Professional Championship from 1987 until 1991 and the Welsh Open from 1992 until 1998 and also from 2005 until 2014.

== Closure and demolition ==
In February 2021, with the facility (particularly the pool area) requiring expensive repairs to reopen, Newport City Council decided to demolish it. The pool closed in August 2021 and the rest of the centre in March 2023, when demolition began. The site is to be used by Coleg Gwent and a new leisure centre without concert facilities is to be built on a riverfront brownfield site approximately 100 metres away.

== See also ==
- Newport International Sports Village
