= Wayne Jones (snooker player) =

Welsh snooker player

Personal information
- Born: 24 December 1959 (age 66) Tredegar, Wales

Sport
- Country: Wales
- Sport: Snooker
- Professional: 1984–2001
- Highest ranking: 22 (1990/1991)
- Best ranking finish: Runner-up (x1)

Wayne Jones (born 24 December 1959) is a Welsh former professional snooker player.

== Early and personal life ==
Jones started playing snooker at the age of nine. He was raised by his grandfather who encouraged his snooker playing after his mother died and his father remarried and moved away. He would play at Abertysswg Working Men’s Club, where he made his first 147 in practice in 1986. He would also practise at the Scala Snooker Club in Merthyr Tydfil. He worked as a bricklayer and landscape gardener prior to turning professional.

== Career ==
He won the Welsh Amateur snooker championship in 1983 by defeating Terry Parsons in the final. He was runner-up to Steve Longworth in the final of the English Amateur Championship in 1984. He turned professional in 1984.

He was runner-up to Terry Griffiths at the 1988 Welsh Professional Championship. He defeated Ray Reardon to reach the semi-final of the Welsh Professional Championship in 1986. He was a quarter-finalist at the 1986 UK Championship, defeating World Champion Dennis Taylor and Eugene Hughes, against whom he made his first televised century, before losing 9-5 to Alex Higgins. He was a finalist in the 1998 Welsh Professional Championship where he lost to Terry Griffiths.

Despite never breaking into the top 16, he reached the last 16 and quarter-finals of several ranking events. He reached the final of the 1989 Classic after eliminating Jimmy White, Eugene Hughes, David Taylor, John Parrott and Willie Thorne. He lost the final 11–13 to Doug Mountjoy.

He qualified for the main World Championship on four occasions. The first being in his first year as a professional, when he lost 10-4 to Jimmy White. He progressed beyond the first round once, in 1989, when his 10–9 victory over Neal Foulds, but was followed by a 3–13 defeat by Dean Reynolds in the last 16. He was relegated from the professional tour after placing 143rd in the world rankings in 2001.
