= Marcus Owen =

Welsh snooker player

Personal information
- Born: 4 April 1935 Carmarthenshire, Wales
- Died: December 1987 (aged 52) Hackney, London

Sport
- Country: Wales
- Sport: Snooker
- Professional: 1973–1985
- Highest ranking: 17 (1976–1977)
- Best ranking finish: Quarter-final (x1)

Marcus Willoughby Owen (4 April 1935 – December 1987) was a Welsh professional snooker player.

== Career ==
Before turning professional, Owen won the English Under-16 Championship in 1949, and reached the final in 1950. Owen also won the English Amateur Championship on four occasions, in 1958, 1959, 1967 and 1973.

His elder brother Gary was a professional snooker player, and Marcus followed him into the professional game in 1973, entering the 1974 World Championship. There, he beat Dennis Taylor (8-1) and Maurice Parkin (8-5) to set up a last-16 meeting with Gary. Gary held Marcus to 5–5 at one point, but could not prevent him from pulling away to reach the quarter-final with a 15–8 victory. Facing defending champion Ray Reardon, Marcus recovered from 3–9 to 7–9 but was eventually defeated 11–15.

Owen next played a quarter-final at the 1982 Welsh Professional Championship, which was itself an eight-man event. He lost his first match 0–6 to Cliff Wilson.

Owen had no further success in professional snooker, his last match being a 0–6 loss to Tony Chappel in the first round of the 1985 edition of the Welsh Professional Championship; having held 17th place in the inaugural world rankings in 1976, he had not occupied a position on the list since 1980.

He resigned as a professional player in 1987.

== Personal life ==
Owen died in hospital in December 1987, under 'tragic circumstances'.

== Performance and rankings timeline ==
| Tournament | 1973/ 74 | 1974/ 75 | 1975/ 76 | 1976/ 77 | 1977/ 78 | 1981/ 82 | 1982/ 83 | 1983/ 84 | 1984/ 85 |
|---|---|---|---|---|---|---|---|---|---|
| Ranking | No ranking system | | | 17 | 23 | UR | UR | UR | UR |
Ranking tournaments
| Professional Players Tournament | Tournament Not Held | | | | | | LQ | A | A |
| International Open | Tournament Not Held | | | | | NR | LQ | A | A |
| World Championship | QF | A | LQ | A | A | A | LQ | A | A |
Non-ranking tournaments
| Welsh Professional Championship | Not Held | | | A | NH | QF | QF | QF | 1R |
Former non-ranking tournaments
| Norwich Union Open | 1R | 1R | Not Held | | | | | | |
| Watney Open | NH | WD | Not Held | | | | | | |
| International Open | Tournament Not Held | | | | | LQ | Ranking | | |
| UK Championship | Tournament Not Held | | | | A | A | LQ | A | R |

Performance Table Legend
| LQ | lost in the qualifying draw | #R | lost in the early rounds of the tournament (WR = Wildcard round, RR = Round robin) | QF | lost in the quarter-finals |
| SF | lost in the semi-finals | F | lost in the final | W | won the tournament |
| DNQ | did not qualify for the tournament | A | did not participate in the tournament | WD | withdrew from the tournament |

| NH / Not Held | means an event was not held. |
| NR / Non-Ranking Event | means an event is/was no longer a ranking event. |
| R / Ranking Event | means an event is/was a ranking event. |

== Career finals ==
=== Amateur finals: 4 (3 titles) ===
| Outcome | No. | Year | Championship | Opponent in the final | Score |
|---|---|---|---|---|---|
| Winner | 1. | 1958 | English Amateur Championship | (England) Jack Fitzmaurice | 11–8 |
| Winner | 2. | 1959 | English Amateur Championship (2) | (England) Allan Barnett | 11–5 |
| Runner-up | 1. | 1966 | English Amateur Championship | (England) John Spencer | 5–11 |
| Winner | 3. | 1967 | English Amateur Championship (3) | (England) Sid Hood | 11–4 |
| Winner | 4. | 1973 | English Amateur Championship (4) | (England) Ray Edmonds | 11–6 |
