= 1970 Pot Black =

Tournament information
- Dates: Recorded early 1970 (broadcast 23 March – 6 July 1970)
- Venue: BBC Studios
- City: Birmingham
- Country: England
- Format: Non-ranking event
- Highest break: (England) Fred Davis (54)

Final
- Champion: (England) John Spencer
- Runner-up: (Wales) Ray Reardon
- Score: 88–27

The 1970 Pot Black event was the second edition of Pot Black, a professional invitational snooker tournament which was first broadcast in 1969. The event was recorded in early 1970 at the BBC TV Studios in Gosta Green, Birmingham. The tournament featured eight professional players. All matches were one-frame shoot-outs.

Broadcasts were on BBC2, starting with an introductory programme at 9:45 pm on Monday 23 March 1970. This year, the tournament moved to a round-robin format with two groups of four players, the top two players from each group qualifying for a place in the semi-finals. Alan Weeks took over as presenter, with Ted Lowe remaining as commentator and Sydney Lee as referee.

The two finalists were the same as the previous year but the result was in reverse. John Spencer defeated Ray Reardon 88–27 in the one-frame final which was broadcast on 6 July 1970.

== Main draw ==
=== League 1 ===
Player 1	Score	Player 2	Broadcast Date
(England) Fred Davis	0–1	(England) Rex Williams	30 March 1970
(England) John Spencer	1–0	(England) Kingsley Kennerley	13 April 1970
(England) Fred Davis	0–1	(England) John Spencer	27 April 1970
(England) Rex Williams	1–0	(England) Kingsley Kennerley	11 May 1970
(England) Fred Davis	1–0	(England) Kingsley Kennerley	25 May 1970
(England) Rex Williams	1–0	(England) John Spencer	8 June 1970

=== League 2 ===
Player 1	Score	Player 2	Broadcast Date
(Wales) Gary Owen	0–1	(England) John Pulman	6 April 1970
(Wales) Ray Reardon	1–0	(Northern Ireland) Jackie Rea	20 April 1970
(Wales) Gary Owen	0–1	(Wales) Ray Reardon	4 May 1970
(England) John Pulman	1–0	(Northern Ireland) Jackie Rea	18 May 1970
(Wales) Gary Owen	1–0	(Northern Ireland) Jackie Rea	1 June 1970
(England) John Pulman	1–0	(Wales) Ray Reardon	15 June 1970

=== Knockout stage ===
Semi-finals (22 and 29 June 1970)		Final (6 July 1970)
(England) John Spencer	1
(England) John Pulman	0	(England) John Spencer	88
(England) Rex Williams	0	(Wales) Ray Reardon	27
(Wales) Ray Reardon	1
