= 1978–79 snooker season =

Details
- Duration: August 1978 – June 1979
- Tournaments: 16 (1 ranking event)

Triple Crown winners
- UK Championship: (Wales) Doug Mountjoy
- Masters: (South Africa) Perrie Mans
- World Championship: (Wales) Terry Griffiths

The 1978–79 snooker season was a series of snooker tournaments played between August 1978 and June 1979. The following table outlines the results for the ranking and the invitational events.

== New professional players ==
Terry Griffiths became a professional player on 1 June 1978 after he was accepted as a member by the World Professional Billiards and Snooker Association (WPBSA) at its meeting during the 1978 World Snooker Championship. At the same meeting, South African players Mannie Francisco, Silvino Francisco, Jimmy van Rensberg, Roy Amdor and Derek Mienie were recognised as professionals. Ray Edmonds was accepted later that month, while Steve Davis and Mark Wildman were rejected. Later that year, Davis was accepted, with effect from 17 September 1978. In December, Kirk Stevens was accepted, but Wildman and Eddie Sinclair were refused.

== Calendar ==
| Date (Note: Dates use the mm-dd date format.) | | | Rank | Tournament name | Venue | City | Winner | Runner-up | Score | Reference |
|---|---|---|---|---|---|---|---|---|---|---|
| 08-?? | 08-?? | RSA | NR | South African Professional Championship | | | (South Africa) Perrie Mans | (South Africa) Silvino Francisco | 9–5 | |
| 08–16 | 09–04 | CAN | NR | Canadian Open | Canadian National Exhibition Stadium | Toronto | (Canada) Cliff Thorburn | (England) Tony Meo | 17–15 | |
| 11–02 | 11–03 | ENG | NR | Champion of Champions | Wembley Conference Centre | London | (Wales) Ray Reardon | (Northern Ireland) Alex Higgins | 11–9 | |
| 11–22 | 12–01 | ENG | NR | UK Championship | Guild Hall | Preston | (Wales) Doug Mountjoy | (England) David Taylor | 15–9 | |
| 12–04 | 12–15 | AUS | NR | Australian Professional Championship | Grafton Services Club | Grafton | (Australia) Eddie Charlton | (Australia) Ian Anderson | (Note: The result of the final is unknown.) | |
| 12-?? | 12-?? | ENG | NR | Pot Black | BBC Studios | Birmingham | (Wales) Ray Reardon | (Wales) Doug Mountjoy | 2–1 | |
| 01–14 | 01–17 | ENG | NR | Holsten Lager International | Fulcrum Centre | Slough | (England) John Spencer | (England) Graham Miles | 11–7 | |
| 01–22 | 01–26 | ENG | NR | The Masters | Wembley Conference Centre | London | (South Africa) Perrie Mans | (Northern Ireland) Alex Higgins | 8–4 | |
| 10–23 | 01–28 | ENG | NR | Forward Chemicals Tournament | Royal Exchange Theatre (Note: Played at various venues throughout the country under a round robin system, with the top two players meeting at the Royal Exchange Theatre in Manchester.) | Manchester | (Wales) Ray Reardon | (England) John Spencer | 9–6 | |
| 02–01 | 02–03 | IRL | NR | Irish Masters | Goff's | Kill | (Wales) Doug Mountjoy | (Wales) Ray Reardon | 6–5 | |
| 02–10 | 02–14 | IND | NR | Bombay International | Bombay Gymkhana | Bombay | (England) John Spencer | (Northern Ireland) Dennis Taylor | (Note: No play-off was held and the title was decided on league table only.) | |
| 02–20 | 02–21 | ENG | NR | Tolly Cobbold Classic | Corn Exchange | Ipswich | (Northern Ireland) Alex Higgins | (Wales) Ray Reardon | 5–4 | |
| 03–20 | 03–22 | NIR | NR | Irish Professional Championship | Ulster Hall | Belfast | (Northern Ireland) Alex Higgins | (Republic of Ireland) Patsy Fagan | 21–12 | |
| 04–16 | 04–28 | ENG | WR | World Snooker Championship | Crucible Theatre | Sheffield | (Wales) Terry Griffiths | (Northern Ireland) Dennis Taylor | 24–16 | |
| 05-05 | 05–12 | WAL | NR | Pontins Professional | Pontins | Prestatyn | (Wales) Doug Mountjoy | (England) Graham Miles | 8–4 | |
| 06–09 | | NIR | NR | Golden Masters | Queen's Hall | Newtownards | (Wales) Ray Reardon | (England) Graham Miles | 4–2 | |

WR = World ranking event
NR = Non-ranking event

== Official rankings ==
The top 16 of the world rankings.

| No. | Ch. | Name |
|---|---|---|
| 1 | Steady | (Wales) Ray Reardon |
| 2 | ▲ | (South Africa) Perrie Mans |
| 3 | Steady | (Australia) Eddie Charlton |
| 4 | ▼ | (England) John Spencer |
| 5 | ▲ | (Canada) Cliff Thorburn |
| 6 | ▲ | (England) Fred Davis |
| 7 | ▼ | (Northern Ireland) Alex Higgins |
| 8 | ▼ | (Northern Ireland) Dennis Taylor |
| 9 | ▼ | (England) Graham Miles |
| 10 | ▼ | (England) John Pulman |
| 11 | ▲ | (Republic of Ireland) Patsy Fagan |
| 12 | ▲ | (Canada) Bill Werbeniuk |
| 13 | ▼ | (England) David Taylor |
| 14 | Steady | (Wales) Doug Mountjoy |
| 15 | ▲ | (England) Willie Thorne |
| 16 | ▼ | (England) Jim Meadowcroft |
