= 1971 Pot Black =

Tournament information
- Dates: Recorded early 1971 (broadcast 17 February – 2 June 1971)
- Venue: BBC Studios
- City: Birmingham
- Country: England
- Format: Non-ranking event
- Highest break: (England) Fred Davis (73)

Final
- Champion: (England) John Spencer
- Runner-up: (England) Fred Davis
- Score: 61–40

The 1971 Pot Black event was the third edition of Pot Black, a professional invitational snooker tournament which was first broadcast in 1969. The event was recorded in early 1971 at the BBC TV Studios in Gosta Green, Birmingham. The tournament featured eight professional players. All matches were one-frame shoot-outs.

Broadcasts were on BBC2, starting with an introductory programme at 9:00 pm on Wednesday 17 February 1971 The tournament again used a round-robin format with two groups of four players, the top two from each group qualifying for a place in the semi-finals. The players in this event were mainly the same as the previous two, but Ray Reardon was replaced by David Taylor who was making his television debut. Alan Weeks presented the programme, with Ted Lowe as commentator and Sydney Lee as referee.

John Spencer retained his Pot Black title, beating Fred Davis 88–27 in the one-frame final which was broadcast on 2 June 1971.

== Main draw ==
=== League 1 ===
Player 1	Score	Player 2	Broadcast Date
(England) John Spencer	1–0	(England) David Taylor	24 February 1971
(England) John Pulman	0–1	(England) Rex Williams	10 March 1971
(England) John Spencer	0–1	(England) John Pulman	24 March 1971
(England) David Taylor	0–1	(England) Rex Williams	7 April 1971
(England) John Spencer	1–0	(England) Rex Williams	21 April 1971
(England) David Taylor	0–1	(England) John Pulman	5 May 1971

=== League 2 ===
Player 1	Score	Player 2	Broadcast Date
(England) Kingsley Kennerley	0–1	(Northern Ireland) Jackie Rea	3 March 1971
(Wales) Gary Owen	1–0	(England) Fred Davis	17 March 1971
(England) Kingsley Kennerley	0–1	(Wales) Gary Owen	31 March 1971
(Northern Ireland) Jackie Rea	0–1	(England) Fred Davis	14 April 1971
(England) Kingsley Kennerley	1–0	(England) Fred Davis	28 April 1971
(Northern Ireland) Jackie Rea	0–1	(Wales) Gary Owen	12 May 1971

=== Knockout stage ===
Semi-finals (19 and 26 May 1971)		Final (2 June 1971)
(England) John Spencer	1
(Wales) Gary Owen	0	(England) John Spencer	1
(England) Rex Williams	0	(England) Fred Davis	0
(England) Fred Davis	1
