= 1984 Pot Black =

Pot Black 84
Tournament information
- Dates: 28–30 December 1983 (broadcast 4 January – 11 April 1984)
- Venue: Pebble Mill Studios
- City: Birmingham
- Country: England
- Organisation: WPBSA
- Format: Non-Ranking event
- Total prize fund: £41,250
- Winner's share: £5,000
- Highest break: (Northern Ireland) Dennis Taylor (81)

Final
- Champion: (Wales) Terry Griffiths
- Runner-up: (England) John Spencer
- Score: 2–1

The 1984 Pot Black was the sixteenth edition of the professional invitational snooker tournament, which took place between 28 and 30 December 1983 but was broadcast in early 1984. The tournament was held at Pebble Mill Studios in Birmingham. For the first time since the inaugural tournament in 1969, the championship was reverted to a knockout format and players risen from 8 to 16. This change was made at the request of the players, who asked for a competition, in which more of them could take part. All matches until the final were one-frame shoot-outs, the final being contested over the best of three frames.

Broadcasts were on BBC2 and started at 21:00 on Wednesday 4 January 1984 Alan Weeks presented the programme with Ted Lowe as commentator and John Williams as referee.

With the tournament now risen to 16 players, there were Pot Black debuts for Tony Meo, Silvino Francisco and Mark Wildman and original series player John Spencer played for the first time since 1980. Terry Griffiths who also last played in 1980 won the event, his ninth professional title, beating Spencer 2–1 in the final.

== Main draw ==
Last 16
(England) John Spencer	110
(Northern Ireland) Alex Higgins	9
(Australia) Eddie Charlton	1
(England) Tony Meo	0
(England) Jimmy White	94
(England) David Taylor	12
(England) Steve Davis	1
(England) Mark Wildman	0
(England) Willie Thorne	55
(England) Tony Knowles	42
(Northern Ireland) Dennis Taylor	1
(Canada) Kirk Stevens	0
(South Africa) Silvino Francisco	1
(Wales) Ray Reardon	0
(Wales) Terry Griffiths	81
(Wales) Doug Mountjoy	40

Quarter-finals
(England) John Spencer	70
(Australia) Eddie Charlton	26
(England) Jimmy White	71
(England) Steve Davis	9
(England) Willie Thorne	65
(Northern Ireland) Dennis Taylor	34
(South Africa) Silvino Francisco	16
(Wales) Terry Griffiths	106

Semi-finals; Aggregate score of 2 frames
(England) John Spencer	142
(England) Jimmy White	80
(England) Willie Thorne	0
(Wales) Terry Griffiths	1

Final; Best of 3 frames
(England) John Spencer	1
(Wales) Terry Griffiths	2

Match dates of transmission

Player 1	Player 2	Broadcast Date
(England) John Spencer	(Northern Ireland) Alex Higgins	4 January 1984
(England) Willie Thorne	(England) Tony Knowles	11 January 1984
(England) Jimmy White	(England) David Taylor	18 January 1984
(Wales) Terry Griffiths	(Wales) Doug Mountjoy	25 January 1984
(Australia) Eddie Charlton	(England) Tony Meo	1 February 1984
(Northern Ireland) Dennis Taylor	(Canada) Kirk Stevens	8 February 1984
(England) Steve Davis	(England) Mark Wildman	15 February 1984
(South Africa) Silvino Francisco	(Wales) Ray Reardon	22 February 1984
(England) John Spencer	(Australia) Eddie Charlton	29 February 1984
(England) Willie Thorne	(Northern Ireland) Dennis Taylor	7 March 1984
(England) Jimmy White	(England) Steve Davis	14 March 1984
(Wales) Terry Griffiths	(South Africa) Silvino Francisco	21 March 1984
(England) John Spencer	(England) Jimmy White	28 March 1984
(Wales) Terry Griffiths	(England) Willie Thorne	4 April 1984
(Wales) Terry Griffiths	(England) John Spencer	11 April 1984

== Final ==
Final: Best of 3 frames. Pebble Mill Studios, Birmingham, England, 30 December 1983 (Broadcast 11 April 1984).
Terry Griffiths; Wales	2–1	John Spencer; England
