= 1977–78 snooker season =

Details
- Duration: 17 September 1977 – June 1978
- Tournaments: 13 (1 ranking event)

Triple Crown winners
- UK Championship: (Republic of Ireland) Patsy Fagan
- Masters: (Northern Ireland) Alex Higgins
- World Championship: (Wales) Ray Reardon

The 1977–78 snooker season was a series of snooker tournaments played between September 1977 and June 1978. The following table outlines the results for the ranking and the invitational events.

== Calendar ==
Date (Note: Dates use the mm-dd date format.)			Rank	Tournament name	Venue	City	Winner	Runner-up	Score	Reference
08-17	09-05	CAN	NR	Canadian Open	Canadian National Exhibition Stadium	Toronto	(Northern Ireland) Alex Higgins	(England) John Spencer	17–14	
09-??	09-??	AUS	NR	Australian Professional Championship	Golden Bowl	Melbourne	(Australia) Eddie Charlton	(Australia) Paddy Morgan	25–21	
09–25	09–26	WAL	NR	Welsh Professional Championship	Club Double Diamond	Caerphilly	(Wales) Ray Reardon	(Wales) Doug Mountjoy	12–8	
11–26	12–03	ENG	NR	UK Championship	Tower Circus	Blackpool	(Republic of Ireland) Patsy Fagan	(Wales) Doug Mountjoy	12–9	
12-??	12-??	ENG	NR	Pot Black	BBC Studios	Birmingham	(Wales) Doug Mountjoy	(England) Graham Miles	2–1	
12–21		ENG	NR	Dry Blackthorn Cup	Wembley Conference Centre	London	(Republic of Ireland) Patsy Fagan	(Northern Ireland) Alex Higgins	4–2	
02-02	02–04	NIR	NR	Irish Professional Championship	Ulster Hall	Belfast	(Northern Ireland) Alex Higgins	(Northern Ireland) Dennis Taylor	21–7	
02–06	02–10	ENG	NR	The Masters	New London Theatre	London	(Northern Ireland) Alex Higgins	(Canada) Cliff Thorburn	7–5	
03–08	03–10	IRL	NR	Irish Masters	Goff's	Kill	(England) John Spencer	(Wales) Doug Mountjoy	5–3	
04–13	04–16	NIR	NR	Irish Professional Championship	Ulster Hall	Belfast	(Northern Ireland) Alex Higgins	(Republic of Ireland) Patsy Fagan	21–13	
04–17	04–29	ENG	WR	World Snooker Championship	Crucible Theatre	Sheffield	(Wales) Ray Reardon	(South Africa) Perrie Mans	25–18	
04–29	05–06	WAL	NR	Pontins Professional	Pontins	Prestatyn	(Wales) Ray Reardon	(England) John Spencer	7–2	
06–10		NIR	NR	Golden Masters	Queen's Hall	Newtownards	(Wales) Doug Mountjoy	(Wales) Ray Reardon	4–2	

WR = World ranking event
NR = Non-ranking event

== Official rankings ==
The top 16 of the world rankings.

No.	Ch.	Name
1	Steady	(Wales) Ray Reardon
2	▲	(England) John Spencer
3	Steady	(Australia) Eddie Charlton
4	▲	(Northern Ireland) Dennis Taylor
5	▼	(Northern Ireland) Alex Higgins
6	▲	(Canada) Cliff Thorburn
7	▲	(England) John Pulman
8	▼	(England) Graham Miles
9	▼	(England) Fred Davis
10	▼	(South Africa) Perrie Mans
11	▼	(England) Rex Williams
12	▲	(England) David Taylor
13	▼	(Wales) Gary Owen
14	New entry	(Wales) Doug Mountjoy
15	▼	(England) Jim Meadowcroft
16	▼	(England) John Dunning
