= Norwich Union Open =

Tournament information
- Venue: Piccadilly Hotel
- Location: London
- Country: England
- Established: 1973
- Organisation(s): WPBSA
- Format: Invitational event
- Final year: 1974
- Final champion: (England) John Spencer

The Norwich Union Open was a professional invitational snooker tournament. The winner of both editions was John Spencer.

== History ==
The Norwich Union Open was a tournament open to both professionals and amateurs and featured 24 players in its first season. In the second year it featured just 16 players, but the prize money was increased. Both editions of the tournament were held at the Piccadilly Hotel in London.

== Winners ==
| Year | Winner | Runner-up | Final score | Season |
|---|---|---|---|---|
| 1973 | (England) John Spencer | (England) John Pulman | 8–7 | 1973/74 |
| 1974 | (England) John Spencer | (Wales) Ray Reardon | 10–9 | 1974/75 |

== See also ==
- Norwich Union Grand Prix
