= 1974–75 snooker season =

Details
- Duration: July 1974 – May 1975
- Tournaments: 11 (non-ranking)

Triple Crown winners
- Masters: (England) John Spencer
- World Championship: (Wales) Ray Reardon

The 1974–75 snooker season was a series of snooker tournaments played between August 1974 and May 1975. The following table outlines the results for the season's events.

== Calendar ==
Date (Note: Dates use the mm-dd date format.)			Rank	Tournament name	Venue	City	Winner	Runner-up	Score	Reference
07-01	07-05	AUS	NR	World Masters	Victorian Club	South Yarra	(Canada) Cliff Thorburn	(England) John Spencer	(Note: The result was determined by cumulative points over two frames. Thorburn won 160–67.)	
08-01	08-30	AUS	NR	Australian Professional Championship	Wagga RSL Club	Wagga Wagga	(Australia) Eddie Charlton	(Australia) Warren Simpson	44–17	
09-??	09-??	CAN	NR	Canadian Open	Canadian National Exhibition Stadium	Toronto	(Canada) Cliff Thorburn	(Northern Ireland) Dennis Taylor	8–6	
10–23	10–25	ENG	NR	Jackpot Automatics	Cliffs Pavilion	Westcliff-on-Sea	(England) John Spencer	(Northern Ireland) Alex Higgins	5–0	
11–18	11–22	ENG	NR	Norwich Union Open	Piccadilly Hotel	London	(England) John Spencer	(Wales) Ray Reardon	10–9	
11–25	11–26	ENG	NR	Ladywood Professional	Rock Gardens Pavilion	Southsea	(Northern Ireland) Alex Higgins	(England) Graham Miles	6–4	
12–02	12–03	ENG	NR	Burscough Professional	Stanley Club	Burscough	(England) Graham Miles	unknown (Note: Round-robin with Ray Reardon, John Spencer, and John Pulman)	RR	
09–07	12–22	ENG	NR	Watney Open	Northern Snooker Centre	Leeds	(Northern Ireland) Alex Higgins	(England) Fred Davis	17–11	
12–28	12–31	ENG	NR	Pot Black	BBC Studios	Birmingham	(England) Graham Miles	(Northern Ireland) Dennis Taylor	1–0	
01–03	01–06	ENG	NR	Ladbroke International			Rest of the World	England	(Note: The result was determined by cumulative score.)	
01–13	01–17	ENG	NR	The Masters	West Centre Hotel	London	(England) John Spencer	(Wales) Ray Reardon	9–8	
02-24		IRL	NR	Benson & Hedges Ireland Tournament	National Boxing Stadium	Dublin	(England) John Spencer	(Northern Ireland) Alex Higgins	9–7	
10-??	04–02	ENG	NR	Ashton Court Country Club Professional	Ashton Court Country Club	Bristol	(England) John Spencer	(Northern Ireland) Alex Higgins	5–1	
04-??	04-??	ENG	NR	Suffolk Invitation	Mid-Suffolk Sports Centre	Stowmarket	(Northern Ireland) Alex Higgins	(Northern Ireland) Graham Miles	5–1	
04–09	05–01	AUS	NR	World Snooker Championship	Nunawading Basketball Centre	Melbourne	(Wales) Ray Reardon	(Australia) Eddie Charlton	31–30	
05-??	05-??	WAL	NR	Pontins Professional	Pontins	Prestatyn	(Wales) Ray Reardon	(England) John Spencer	10–4	
05–27	05–29	ENG	NR	Marton Hotel and Country Club Professional	Marton Hotel and Country Club	Middlesbrough	(Northern Ireland) Alex Higgins	(England) David Taylor	6–5	
