= 1975–76 snooker season =

Details
- Duration: August 1975 – 8 May 1976
- Tournaments: 8 (1 ranking event)

Triple Crown winners
- Masters: (Wales) Ray Reardon
- World Championship: (Wales) Ray Reardon

The 1975–76 snooker season was a series of snooker tournaments played between August 1975 and May 1976. The following table outlines the results for the ranking and the invitational events.

== New professional ==
Willie Thorne was accepted as a professional player by the World Professional Billiards and Snooker Association at its meeting on 15 November 1975.

== Calendar ==
| Date (Note: Dates use the mm-dd date format.) | | | Rank | Tournament name | Venue | City | Winner | Runner-up | Score | Reference |
|---|---|---|---|---|---|---|---|---|---|---|
| 08-?? | 08-29 | AUS | NR | Australian Professional Championship | Wagga RSL Club | Wagga Wagga | (Australia) Eddie Charlton | (Australia) Dennis Wheelwright | 31–10 | |
| 08–13 | 09–01 | CAN | NR | Canadian Open | Canadian National Exhibition Stadium | Toronto | (Northern Ireland) Alex Higgins | (England) John Pulman | 15–7 | |
| 09-09 | 09–11 | ENG | NR | Ford/Riley Burwat Tournament | Greyhound Garage | Accrington | (Northern Ireland) Dennis Taylor | (Northern Ireland) Alex Higgins | 4–2 | |
| 12–27 | 12–30 | ENG | NR | Pot Black | BBC Studios | Birmingham | (England) John Spencer | (Northern Ireland) Dennis Taylor | 1–0 | |
| 01–10 | 01–11 | ENG | NR | Champion of Champions | Middlesbrough Town Hall | Middlesbrough | (England) John Spencer | (England) Graham Miles | 5–4 | |
| 01-?? | 01-?? | ENG | NR | Tony's Club Tournament | Tony's Club | Weybridge | (Northern Ireland) Alex Higgins | (England) John Spencer | 4–1 | |
| 01-?? | 01-?? | ENG | NR | Suffolk Invitation | Corn Exchange | Ipswich | (Northern Ireland) Dennis Taylor | (Canada) Cliff Thorburn | 7–4 | |
| 01-?? | 01-?? | ENG | NR | Southsea Invitational | New Pier | Southsea | (Northern Ireland) Dennis Taylor | (England) Willie Thorne | 4–1 | |
| 01–26 | 01–30 | ENG | NR | The Masters | New London Theatre | London | (Wales) Ray Reardon | (England) Graham Miles | 7–3 | |
| 02-21 | | IRL | NR | Benson & Hedges Ireland Tournament | National Boxing Stadium | Dublin | (England) John Spencer | (Northern Ireland) Alex Higgins | 5–0 | |
| ??-?? | 04–05 | ENG | NR | Ashton Club Jubilee Snooker Tournament | Ashton Court Country Club | Bristol | (Northern Ireland) Dennis Taylor | (Northern Ireland) Alex Higgins | 5–2 | |
| 04-11 | 04-23 | ENG | WR | World Snooker Championship | Middlesbrough Town Hall | Middlesbrough | (Wales) Ray Reardon | (Northern Ireland) Alex Higgins | 27–16 | |
| 04-11 | 04-23 | ENG | WR | World Snooker Championship | Wythenshawe Forum | Manchester | (Wales) Ray Reardon | (Northern Ireland) Alex Higgins | 27–16 | |
| 05–01 | 05–08 | WAL | NR | Pontins Professional | Pontins | Prestatyn | (Wales) Ray Reardon | (England) Fred Davis | 10–9 | |
| 05–08 | 05–11 | ENG | NR | Canadian Club Masters | Northern Snooker Centre | Leeds | (Northern Ireland) Alex Higgins | (Wales) Ray Reardon | 6–4 | |

WR = World ranking event
NR = Non-ranking event

== Order of Merit ==
This Order of Merit was published after the 1975 World Snooker Championship, and was used for seeding purposes. It used the same criteria as the first official rankings list for the next season.

| No. | Name |
|---|---|
| 1 | (Wales) Ray Reardon |
| 2 | (Australia) Eddie Charlton |
| 3 | (Northern Ireland) Alex Higgins |
| 4 | (England) Rex Williams |
| 5 | (England) Graham Miles |
| 6 | (England) John Spencer |
| 7 | (England) Fred Davis |
| 8 | (Wales) Gary Owen |
| 9 | (Northern Ireland) Dennis Taylor |
| 10 | (Canada) Cliff Thorburn |
| 11 | (England) John Pulman |
| 12 | (England) John Dunning |
| 13 | (South Africa) Perrie Mans |
| 14 | (Canada) Bill Werbeniuk |
| 15 | (Australia) Warren Simpson |
| 16 | (England) David Taylor |
| 17 | (England) Jim Meadowcroft |
| 18 | (Wales) Marcus Owen |
| 19 | (Australia) Ian Anderson |
| 20 | (Australia) Paddy Morgan |
| 21 | (England) Bernard Bennett |
| 22 | (England) David Greaves |
| 23 | (England) Pat Houlihan |
