= 1976 Pot Black =

Tournament information
- Dates: Recorded early 1976 (broadcast 21 May – 17 September 1976)
- Venue: Pebble Mill Studios
- City: Birmingham
- Country: England
- Format: Non-ranking event
- Winner's share: £1000
- Highest break: (Australia) Eddie Charlton (64)

Final
- Champion: (England) John Spencer
- Runner-up: (Northern Ireland) Dennis Taylor
- Score: 69–42

The 1976 Pot Black was a professional invitational snooker tournament, which was held in the Pebble Mill Studios in Birmingham, and featured eight professional players. All matches were one-frame shoot-outs.

Broadcasts were on BBC2 and started at 21:00 on Friday 21 May 1976 Alan Weeks presented the programme with Ted Lowe as commentator and Sydney Lee as referee.

Willie Thorne made his debut in this year's tournament against Fred Davis in the first show of the series. John Spencer won his third title beating Dennis Taylor 69-42

== Main draw ==
=== Challengers League ===
Player 1	Score	Player 2	Broadcast Date
(England) Fred Davis	1–0	(England) Willie Thorne	21 May 1976
(Northern Ireland) Dennis Taylor	0–1	(England) Rex Williams	4 June 1976
(England) Willie Thorne	0–1	(Northern Ireland) Dennis Taylor	18 June 1976
(England) Fred Davis	0–1	(England) Rex Williams	2 July 1976
(England) Willie Thorne	0–1	(England) Rex Williams	30 July 1976
(England) Fred Davis	0–1	(Northern Ireland) Dennis Taylor	13 August 1976

=== Champions League ===
Player 1	Score	Player 2	Broadcast Date
(Australia) Eddie Charlton	1–0	(England) Graham Miles	28 May 1976
(England) John Spencer	0–1	(Wales) Ray Reardon	11 June 1976
(Wales) Ray Reardon	0–1	(Australia) Eddie Charlton	25 June 1976
(England) Graham Miles	0–1	(England) John Spencer	23 July 1976
(Australia) Eddie Charlton	0–1	(England) John Spencer	6 August 1976
(Wales) Ray Reardon	0–1	(England) Graham Miles	20 August 1976

=== Knockout stage ===
Semi-finals (27 August and 3 September 1976)
(Northern Ireland) Dennis Taylor	1
(England) Rex Williams	0
(England) John Spencer	1
(Australia) Eddie Charlton	0

Final (17 September 1976)
(Northern Ireland) Dennis Taylor	0
(England) John Spencer	1
3rd place Play-off (10 September 1976)
(England) Rex Williams	1
(Australia) Eddie Charlton	0
