= John Spencer (snooker player) =

English snooker player (1935–2006)

Personal information
- Born: 18 September 1935 Radcliffe, Lancashire, England
- Died: 11 July 2006 (aged 70) Bolton, Lancashire, England

Sport
- Country: England
- Sport: Snooker
- Professional: 1967–1992
- Highest ranking: 2 (1977/78)

Tournament wins
- Ranking: 1
- World Championship: 1969; 1971; 1977

John Spencer (18 September 1935 – 11 July 2006) was an English professional snooker player. One of the most dominant players of the 1970s, he won the World Snooker Championship three times, in 1969, 1971 and 1977. He worked as a snooker commentator for the BBC from 1978 to 1998 and served for 25 years on the board of the sport's governing body, the World Professional Billiards and Snooker Association (WPBSA), including a stint as chairman from 1990 until his retirement from the board in 1996.

Born in Radcliffe, Lancashire, Spencer started playing snooker on a full-sized table at age 14 and compiled his first century break aged 15. He was conscripted for National Service at age 18 and lost interest in playing snooker for over ten years before taking it up again in 1964. He reached the final of the English Amateur Championship for three years in a row, claiming the title at his third attempt in 1966. He turned professional in 1967—the same year as his amateur rivals Gary Owen and Ray Reardon—and won the world title as a debutant at the 1969 World Snooker Championship, which was staged as a knockout tournament for the first time since 1957, following a series of challenge matches from 1964 to 1968. Spencer defeated Owen 37–24 in the final to become the first World Champion of snooker's modern era. His title defence in 1970 ended with a 33–37 loss in the semi-finals to Reardon, the eventual winner.

He secured his second world title at the 1971 World Championship in Sydney, Australia, defeating Warren Simpson 37–29 in the final to become the first player to win the world title at a knockout event staged overseas. He reached the final again in 1972 but lost 31–37 to Alex Higgins. He won his third world title in 1977, beating Cliff Thorburn 25–21 in the final to become the first player to win the World Championship at Sheffield's Crucible Theatre, where the tournament has been staged annually ever since. Spencer's other notable victories include the inaugural Masters in 1975, where he defeated Reardon on a re-spotted black in the deciding frame of the final, the inaugural Irish Masters in 1978 and three editions of the BBC's Pot Black series. In 1979, he became the first player to compile a maximum break at a professional tournament, although it was not recorded as an official maximum because the pockets on the table had not been measured against the required specifications.

One of the first major professional players to use a two-piece cue, Spencer was noted for his unusual cue action and immense cue power. His later career was severely affected by the ocular version of myasthenia gravis, which was first diagnosed in 1985 and had symptoms including double vision. He made his last Crucible appearance at the 1986 World Championship, losing 7–10 to Higgins in the first round. His last notable achievement in professional play was reaching the quarter-finals of the 1987 British Open at age 51, where he lost 3–5 to Jimmy White. He retired from professional competition in 1992 because of ill health, but continued to perform in exhibition matches and served as chairman of the WPBSA for another four years. Diagnosed with stomach cancer in 2003, he died in a hospice near Bolton on 11 July 2006, aged 70. The trophy for the World Seniors Masters tournament was named in his memory in 2018.

== Early years and amateur snooker career ==
John Spencer was born on 18 September 1935 at Bealey Maternity Home in Radcliffe, Lancashire, the youngest child of William Spencer, a night watchman and bookkeeper's runner, and his wife Annie, née Bleakley. He attended Stand Grammar School for Boys in Whitefield. He first played snooker on a makeshift table using tape for cushions and nails to mark out the pockets, before being introduced by his father to playing snooker on a full-sized table when aged 14. He compiled his first century break at age 15. He was conscripted to National Service at age 18.

After completing three years of compulsory service in the RAF, Spencer tried out various jobs, including labourer, van driver and betting shop settler, and showed no interest in playing snooker for over ten years. Reintroduced to the sport by an old friend, he opted to take up snooker again at the age of 29. His first tournament was the 1964 English Amateur Snooker Championship, where he finished runner-up to Ray Reardon; the following year, he lost to Pat Houlihan in the final of the same event. Spencer lifted the trophy at his third attempt, in 1966, after an 11–5 victory over Marcus Owen in the final.

He married Margot Sawbridge in 1969. The couple separated in the 1980s, but did not divorce and remained good friends for the rest of Spencer's life.

== Professional snooker career ==
=== 1967–1971: First two world titles ===
Spencer took on professional status in February 1967, becoming the first UK player to do so since Rex Williams in 1951. Spencer was encouraged to turn professional because of the income he could expect to earn from performing regular exhibition matches for the National Spastics Society at £14 a time (equivalent to £223 in 2025), and at Pontins holiday camps during the summer season for a weekly fee of £20, to be increased to £50 a week the following year. His amateur rivals, Gary Owen and Reardon, turned professional in September and December 1967, respectively.

In 1957, the professional world snooker title had passed to John Pulman, and he had retained it through a series of challenge matches from 1964 to 1968. After touring snooker clubs in promotion of the tobacco brand John Player, Pulman had secured sponsorship from the company for his world title challenge against Eddie Charlton in March 1968. The good attendances for this match led to John Player's decision to sponsor the 1969 World Championship as a knockout format tournament. Four of the eight entrants—Spencer, Reardon, Gary Owen and Bernard Bennett—were World Championship debutants; the other four—Pulman, Williams, Fred Davis and Jackie Rea—had played professionally since at least the 1950s. For the entry fee, Spencer took out a bank loan of £100 (equivalent to £1,529 in 2025). He was drawn against Pulman, the defending champion, whom he had recently defeated 17–14 in a non-title challenge match. In November 1968, Spencer eliminated Pulman 25–18 in the opening match of the tournament, before defeating Williams 37–12 in the semi-finals. (Note: After completing the dead frames, the final score was 55–18.)

The best-of-73-frames final between Spencer and Owen was held at Victoria Halls in London, from 17 to 22 March 1969. Spencer developed a 6–2 lead in the first session, but Owen took the next four frames to level the match at 6–6. The correspondent for the Birmingham Daily Post praised the players for bringing a "refreshing new look to the game, with bold attacking play, wonderful potting and a sprinkling of good-sized breaks". Both players missed easy pots at the start of the second day, sharing the first two frames for 7–7; Spencer won the next four to lead 11–7 by the interval, and added four of the subsequent six frames to extend his lead to 15–9. Maintaining his six-frame advantage, he ended the third day's play 21–15 ahead. Owen closed slightly to 19–23 on the fourth day, but Spencer then won four of the six frames in the evening session to end the day six frames ahead again, at 27–21. By the close of play on the fifth day, he was just one frame from victory at 36–24. Spencer took the opening frame on the final day to claim the world title with a winning margin of 37–24. (Note: After completing the dead frames, the final score was 46–27.) His prize money was £1,780 (equivalent to £25,863 in 2025).

Snooker historian Clive Everton later wrote of Spencer's performance in the 1969 World Championship final:

"the new champion's display was a revelation. His long potting, his prodigious screw shots even when cue-ball and object-ball were seven or eight feet apart, his uninhibited use of side, his bright attacking style, even the mere fact that here was a bright new face, made Spencer's win a memorable one."

At the 1970 World Championship, Spencer defeated the veteran Irish Professional Champion, Jackie Rea, 31–15, but then lost his semi-final 33–37 to Reardon, who claimed his first world title. The 1971 World Championship was in fact held in late 1970, and took place in Sydney, Australia. After surviving an incomplete round-robin stage, Spencer decisively eliminated Reardon 34–15 in the semi-finals before defeating Warren Simpson 37–29 in the final to regain the world title. During the final match, he compiled three century breaks over the course of four frames. Between 1969 and 1978, the only three players able to defeat Spencer in World Championship matches were Reardon, Higgins and Perrie Mans; and from 1973 to 1977, he did not lose a match at the World Championship by more than two frames.

Spencer gained some valuable TV exposure by appearing on the BBC's Pot Black series. He won the tournament in 1970—reversing his defeat by Reardon in the 1969 final—and again in 1971, when he beat Fred Davis in the final. He claimed the highest break prize in 1972, finished runner-up to Graham Miles in 1974, and won again in 1976, becoming the first three-time Pot Black champion. In 1971 and 1972, he appeared in four events sponsored by Park Drive cigarettes, known collectively as the Park Drive 2000. Each separate event featured four invited professionals who took part in a triple round-robin contest (playing nine matches each), and the top two players then competed in a final match. Spencer won three of the Park Drive events and reached the final of the fourth, narrowly losing 3–4 to Reardon. In 1971, he won the Stratford Professional with a 5–2 victory over David Taylor.

=== 1972–1976: The resurgence of snooker in Britain ===
The 1972 World Championship final was pivotal in the rise of snooker as one of Britain's most popular sports. Defending his second world title, Spencer eliminated Fred Davis 31–21 and Charlton 37–32, before facing championship debutant Alex Higgins in the final. Dominic Sandbrook wrote in 2019 that the final was contested under "risibly ramshackle conditions". The spectators were seated on wooden boards supported on beer barrels. There was a miners' strike in progress at the time, giving rise to power shortages; in the absence of normal power, the first evening session was conducted with reduced lighting provided by a mobile generator. The week-long final was closely balanced until Higgins won the Thursday evening session 6–0, creating a gap in the scores that Spencer seemed unlikely to overcome. Higgins proceeded to take the match 37–31. (Note: Some sources give the score as 37–32. Hayton & Dee (2004) states: "Higgins triumphed 37–31 (not 37–32 as so many publications have wrongly printed)".)

Spencer made no excuses for his defeat, even though he was feeling exhausted and ill after a major tour of Canada, had been trapped in a lift ahead of one of the sessions, and involved in a minor car crash on the way to another. In his 2005 memoir, he pointed out that he thought Higgins had produced the better snooker in the 1972 world final and had won the match "fair and square". He was also willing to accept that Higgins's win had attracted more sponsorship and promotions, and a greater degree of media interest than if he himself had won the championship. Later the same year, Spencer relinquished another of his titles to Higgins, losing 3–6 in the final of the Stratford Professional tournament.

In 1973 and 1974, the British insurance company Norwich Union sponsored an invitational snooker tournament containing a mix of professional and amateur players. Spencer won both events: in 1973, he defeated Higgins 8–2 in the semi-finals and Pulman 8–7 in the final; and in 1974, he beat Cliff Thorburn 9–7 in the semi-finals and Reardon 10–9 in the final. His 1974 victory came weeks after his cue had been broken into several pieces in a traffic collision and had needed to be repaired. He was runner-up in the two inaugural Pontins events, which both took place in 1974. He lost the Open final 4–7 to amateur Doug Mountjoy, having conceded a handicap of 25 points per frame (due to his professional status), and was runner-up in the Professional event to Reardon, after recovering from 4–9 behind to force a deciding frame. A further sign of snooker's growing popularity came when sports betting company Ladbrokes held a gala evening at London's Café Royal towards the end of 1973, to celebrate the firm's £8,000 investment into the sport in the 1973–74 season. Spencer took the £150 first prize with a 3–2 win over Ray Edmonds. In late 1974, he won the Jackpot Automatics tournament (a minor eight-player invitational) with a 5–0 whitewash of Higgins in the final.

Spencer's good form during this period was not translated into a third world title. At the 1973 World Championship, after showing decisive form in defeating David Taylor 16–5 and Williams 16–7, he lost by a single frame to Reardon in the semi-finals, 22–23; in 1974, after suffering from a dose of influenza, he lost his opening match 13–15 to Mans (whom he next met at the World Championship in 1978 with the same outcome). Spencer won the 1974 'plate' competition—for those knocked out in the first and second rounds of the main tournament—and recorded six centuries in the process of defeating David Greaves 5–1, Dennis Taylor 9–4, Jim Meadowcroft 9–3, and Pulman 15–5 in the final.

In January 1975, Spencer won the inaugural Masters event, held at the West Centre Hotel in Fulham, West London. He eliminated Pulman 5–3 and Charlton 5–2, before defeating Reardon 9–8 in the final. After trailing 6–8, Spencer levelled at 8–8 and took the deciding frame on a re-spotted black. Early the same year, he won the invitational Ashton Court Country Club event, defeating Higgins 5–1 in front of a sellout crowd in the final, as well as taking the highest break prize. He lost 2–5 to Higgins in the final of the Castle Open pro-am, held at Bernard Bennett's Castle Club in Southampton at the end of the year.

There was a degree of controversy over Spencer's elimination from the 1975 World Championship. With the tournament staged in Australia and organised by Charlton, Spencer found himself in the same half of the draw as both Reardon and Higgins, meaning that all of the previous World Champions since 1969 were in one half of the draw and Charlton was in the other. Additionally, Spencer was placed eighth in the organisational seedings, which resulted in his meeting Reardon in the quarter-finals. At the time, both players considered it to be the best match they had yet played against one another, but despite recording two centuries in the first four frames and leading 17–16, Spencer lost the match 17–19. The following year, Spencer experienced an even narrower defeat at the same stage in the 1976 World Championship. After eliminating David Taylor 15–5, and making the highest break of the tournament, 138, in the process, he lost to Higgins in the quarter-finals 14–15. He won the Canadian Open later the same year, defeating John Virgo 9–4 in the semi-finals and Higgins 17–9 in the final to claim the $5,000 prize.

=== 1977–1980: Third world title and first unofficial 147 break ===
Spencer won his third world title in 1977, the first year that the World Snooker Championship was held at the Crucible Theatre in Sheffield. Seeded eighth, he defeated Virgo 13–9 (having trailed 1–4 earlier in the match), Reardon 13–6, Pulman 18–16, and Thorburn 25–21 (recovering from an 11–15 deficit) in the final, to claim the winner's prize of £6,000. This was the last time he would seriously challenge for the world title, and he never again progressed beyond the last-16 stage of the tournament. He followed his World Championship victory by winning the Pontins Professional title, defeating Pulman 7–5 in the final. In September, he again faced Higgins in the final of the Canadian Open, but lost his title 14–17. The tournament was played inside a "big top" circus tent, alongside a traditional circus setup. The conditions were so hot and humid that an accumulation of moisture inside Spencer's breast pocket caused his chalk to snap in half when he tried to use it.

In the spring of 1978, he won the inaugural Irish Masters at Goffs Sales Room in County Kildare, beating Mountjoy 5–3 in the final. He was undefeated in the group stages of the Pontins Professional tournament, winning all five of his matches, before losing 2–7 to Reardon in the final. Spencer warmed up for the 1978 World Championship by winning the Castle Club Professional event, with a 5–3 victory over Higgins in the final. However, he lost his opening World Championship match to Mans, 8–13, despite earlier compiling a 118 break to develop a 3–1 lead. After beginning the final session with a break of 138—which later proved to be the highest of the championship—he then failed to win another frame. The high break prize doubled Spencer's total earnings from the tournament to £1,000.

In January 1979, at the Holsten Lager International, Spencer completed the first ever 147 maximum break in tournament play. Having already taken the first three frames of his quarter-final match against Cliff Thorburn, he compiled a maximum in the fourth. Thames Television were resting their TV crew after filming the previous match between Alex Higgins and David Taylor, so the historic moment was not captured by the TV cameras. Although documented as the first maximum break at a tournament, Spencer's 147 remains unofficial because it could not be verified; the tables at the event had pockets that were not checked against specification using official templates. Spencer won the tournament, defeating Rex Williams 6–2 in the semi-finals and Graham Miles 11–7 in the final. As well as his £3,500 first prize, the sponsors awarded Spencer an additional £500 for the unofficial maximum. (Note: The figure is given as £50 in Spencer's 2005 autobiography Out of the Blue – Into the Black.) Three years later, on 11 January 1982, when Steve Davis made the first televised 147 break at the Lada Classic tournament in Oldham's Queen Elizabeth Hall, Spencer was his onlooking opponent. The maximum was compiled in the fifth frame of their quarter-final match when the scores had been poised at two frames each.

In February 1979, Spencer won the Garware Paints Invitational event in Bombay, which at the time was the biggest tournament yet staged in India. He defeated India's Arvind Savur 6–1, Patsy Fagan 6–4, Miles 6–5, and Thorburn 6–3 in the final, to take the £2,000 first prize and another £200 for the highest break (108), also claiming the 'Man of the Series' award. He reached the semi-finals of the Irish Masters in early 1979, losing 2–3 to Reardon, after making the highest break of the tournament (121) at the group stage. He was runner-up in the 1979 Forward Chemicals Tournament, an extended event that used the old Park Drive 2000 format; Spencer lost to Reardon in the final 6–9. In January 1980, at the first of two Wilson's Classic invitational events, Spencer won £3,000—which at the time was a record for a two-day event. Broadcast by Granada TV, the final included a push-shot incident declared by the referee, Jim Thorpe, against Spencer's opponent Higgins, who was fined £200 for his reaction to the controversial decision. Spencer also won the 1980 Winfield Australian Masters, beating Dennis Taylor on aggregate in the final.

=== 1981–1986: Later years and declining health ===
Spencer's 10–9 first-round victory over Edmonds at the 1981 World Championship was his first success at the tournament since claiming the title in 1977. He lost to Reardon in the second round, 11–13, after leading 3–0 and 7–5. This was the last time the two players faced each other in a World Championship match. In 1981, Spencer was part of the first English team to win the World Cup. Crucially, he defeated Terry Griffiths in the final with the aid of a 103 break, the Welsh player having not lost any of his matches prior to that stage in the competition. Steve Davis then secured victory against Reardon in the tie-break to win the title and the £12,000 prize money. Spencer paired up with Reardon for the first two World Doubles Championships. In 1982, they lost 2–6 to Jimmy White and Tony Knowles in the quarter-finals; and in 1983, they lost 0–5 to Thorburn and Virgo, also in the quarter-finals. The partnership ended when Spencer believed he would be unable to play in the 1984 event due to problems with his vision, and advised Reardon to seek another playing partner. However, a few days later Spencer felt that his medication had improved his symptoms sufficiently that he could play, and he partnered with Knowles, whose own former team-mate White had decided to ally with Higgins.

In April 1982, in the semi-finals of the Highland Masters in Inverness, Spencer achieved a 6–0 whitewash against Higgins (who lifted the world title just four weeks later), before losing 4–11 to Reardon in the final. Spencer took the highest break prize with an effort of 119. That year's World Championship produced a number of upsets and the loss of the top three seeds in round one. Despite a strong performance in defeating John Dunning 10–4 in the first round, Spencer was unable to profit from the more open draw. After keeping pace with Willie Thorne 3–3 in round two, his form deteriorated and he lost the match 5–13. At the end of 1982, Spencer finally won a match in the UK Championship, having lost in the first round every year since the inaugural tournament in 1977. He defeated Eddie Sinclair 9–8 and eliminated Knowles 9–6, before losing to Higgins 5–9 in the quarter-finals.

In 1983, Spencer defeated Reardon 5–3 and David Taylor 5–2 in the first two rounds of the Lada Classic, securing a cheque for £6,000 (equal to the amount he had received for winning the 1977 World Championship). In the semi-finals, he led Steve Davis 3–1, then 4–2, and gained a 45–29 advantage in the deciding frame, but Davis clinched the match. At the 1983 World Championship, Spencer eliminated Mike Hallett 10–7 in the first round before facing Charlton in the second. After taking a 4–0 lead, his intensity waned and, despite a break of 106, he allowed Charlton to pull ahead 12–7. Spencer fought back to win four consecutive frames but, on the verge of levelling at 12–12, he went in-off and subsequently lost the match 11–13.

Spencer's later career was blighted by the ocular version of myasthenia gravis, with symptoms including double vision. He first noticed a problem when he felt unwell at the Pontin's Professional tournament in 1984. (Note: In his 2005 autobiography (p. 9), Spencer gives the date as 9 May 1985 and calls it "the worst day of [his] life". Snooker Scene first reported his condition in their July 1984 issue, and published an update in September 1984.) He later wrote that when the news broke in the press about his condition, only two players sent personal messages to him; one was Thorburn, the other Higgins, who turned up at Spencer's house with a bottle of Bacardi rum but drank it himself as Spencer was not allowed any alcohol at this stage.

He failed to secure the 1984 Pontins Professional title, losing 7–9 to Willie Thorne in the final. During the 1984 World Championship, he defeated Miles 10–3 in the first round and held top seed Steve Davis to 4–6 in round two, before falling behind and losing 5–13. The Miles match was Spencer's last victory at the Crucible. He won only one ranking match during the 1984–85 season, when he whitewashed Frank Jonik 6–0 in the Dulux British Open. He narrowly lost in the 1984 Pot Black final to Griffiths. Spencer's condition made him susceptible to eye strain under bright TV lighting; when he competed in the 1985 Pontins Professional event under ordinary shaded lighting, he once again reached the final, but lost 7–9 to Griffiths. This would prove to be his last notable tournament final.

Ahead of the 1986 World Championship, Spencer journeyed to Scotland for some concentrated practice which helped him to qualify for the main stage of the tournament, where he met Higgins in the first round. Higgins led 8–2 and eventually won by a reduced margin at 10–7. This was the last time Spencer appeared at the Crucible as a participant in the World Snooker Championship. Sports writer Gordon Burn relates that part of Spencer's time practising in Scotland included playing a young Stephen Hendry. After two money-match defeats, Spencer had proposed that they wear casual clothes for the next match, to which Hendry agreed, and Spencer subsequently won their third encounter 6–4. Hendry told his father afterwards that he thought he had been set up, saying "[Spencer] knew that if I was dressed casually, I'd play casually."

=== 1987–1997: Retirement and final years ===
After falling to a career-low 34th in the world rankings for the 1986–87 season, Spencer made a break of 129 in defeating Terry Whitthread 5–2 at the British Open in February 1987. In the final stages of this event, he defeated then-World Champion Joe Johnson 5–3 to reach the quarter-finals. He compiled a century in his last-eight match against White, and captured the sixth frame after requiring six snookers. Despite losing the match 3–5, Spencer enjoyed his highest ever snooker payday with a cheque for £9,000 (equivalent to £26,034 in 2025). He achieved a 5–0 victory over Fred Davis in the 1988 British Open, followed by a 5–0 win over Dennis Taylor, but lost 4–5 in the fifth round to Rex Williams.

Spencer used steroids to reduce the symptoms of his illness, but their effectiveness was inconsistent. He eliminated Ken Owers 10–8 in the 1990 World Championship qualifiers, before proving a tough test in the fourth round for rising star James Wattana, who sealed a 10–8 victory by winning the penultimate frame on the final black and the last frame on the pink. At the 1991 World Championship, he lost 4–10 to Ray Edmonds in his first qualifying match, giving Edmonds a long-awaited victory over Spencer in a rivalry that stretched back to the 1965 English Amateur Championship.

Despite indicating a strong desire to keep playing into the 1991–92 season, and stating an intention to enter all of the events on the calendar, Spencer was too ill to compete in the first six events after a worsening of his condition in June 1991. He kept his playing hopes alive by joining the management group of Six Colours Promotions in February 1992, hoping that this might provide him with a much-needed 'morale boost'. Also involved was then-World Champion John Parrott, whom Spencer had advised ahead of his successful 1991 World Championship campaign. Although well enough to play in the remaining four ranking events of the season, he was only able to win a single frame (against Euan Henderson in the British Open). In his last appearance at the World Championship in 1992, he scored just 207 points against Bjorn L'Orange in the second round of qualifying, losing the match 0–10.

Spencer retired from professional competition in 1992, but continued to perform in exhibition matches. In his 2005 autobiography, he expressed his gratitude to Stephen Hendry's manager, Ian Doyle, for arranging some exhibitions for him after he had stepped down as chairman of the WPBSA. He then began to have trouble with the veins in his legs, leading to problems with mobility. He took part in Seniors Pot Black in 1997, losing to Dennis Taylor. Spencer later wrote that he had been suffering from severe depression caused by his illness at the time of this particular match.

== Playing style and legacy ==
Professional snooker was dominated in the 1970s by two rival players: Spencer and Reardon. Spencer played down talk of a friendship between the two, and stated that they never socialised together. He referred to Reardon as "the sort of person who could laugh 24 hours a day if it was to his advantage."

Spencer was one of the first major professional snooker players to use a two-piece cue, and the first to win the World Championship with a two-piece (in 1977). This particular cue was given to him by Al Selinger of the Dufferin Cue Company during Spencer's victorious run in the 1976 Canadian Open. He chose not to make immediate use of the new cue but began using it in the run-up to the 1977 World Championship. He changed his cue again a few months later, this time opting for a two-piece made in Japan.

Spencer's cue action included an unusually long backswing which gave him immense cue power, allowing him to develop long-distance shots using deep screw and maximum side spin. Everton wrote that in his early career, Spencer "had an attractive, attacking style based on long potting, prodigious screw shots [...] and the kind of confidence usually seen only in a much younger man." Williams and Gadsby commented that Spencer was distinctive for his "immense zest for the sport and his perfection of a stroke few could master – the deep screw shot", and his "fine judgement of lethal long-range pots, a tactic [...] considered fairly risky at the time and nothing like as common as it is today." Spencer's obituarist in the Daily Telegraph wrote that despite his cue power, "his unflappable temperament was perhaps his greatest asset."

In 2018, the WPBSA announced that the World Seniors Masters trophy was being named the John Spencer Trophy in his memory.

== Non-playing career and personal life ==
In 1973, Cassell published Spencer's instructional book, Spencer on Snooker, in which he also gave his opinions on the strengths and weaknesses of other leading professional snooker players. (Note: A second edition was published in 1978.) A revised version, edited by Everton, was published in 1986 as Snooker in the Teach Yourself book series. (Note: A second edition was published in 1992.)

Following his defeat by Mans in the 1978 World Championship, Spencer was invited by producer and Question of Sport creator Nick Hunter to try his hand at snooker commentary for the BBC, a task that he enjoyed for the next 19 years. He featured in a televised pro-am golf show in 1980, and guested on the quiz show Pot the Question on BBC1 in 1984. He opened a snooker club in Bolton called "Spencer's" in 1985, and another in the same town the following year. In 1987, he and his wife Margot agreed to separate after 18 years of marriage.

Spencer appeared in three episodes of the snooker-themed show Big Break—in 1991, 1992, and 1997. Despite his poor health, he chaired the WPBSA for seven years; he resigned in November 1996, completing a 25-year tenure on the governing board. Poor health also led to his departure from the role of commentator in 1998. In his memoirs, he recalled struggling through the role before retiring back to his hotel room, and he related that he was deeply moved by the kindness of fellow commentators Ted Lowe and Ray Edmonds.

Diagnosed with stomach cancer in early 2003, Spencer refused to undergo chemotherapy, choosing to enjoy the rest of his life without its side effects. He attended the Crucible in May 2005 for the Parade of Champions, which took place before the final session of the 2005 World Championship final. Despite his ill health, he took part in a sponsored parachute jump in 2005 to raise funds for the Myasthenia Gravis Association. The same year, his autobiography Out of the Blue – Into the Black was published. Everton concluded his review of the book with: "After a long spell of obscurity, Snooker needed new heroes and in that small cast he was at the forefront. He has an honourable place in Snooker's history."

Spencer's later years were spent with his new partner, Jean Shepherd, while he also remained amicable with his wife Margot. He died on 11 July 2006 in a hospice near Bolton, aged 70, from the effects of stomach cancer.

== Performance and rankings timelines ==
Performance and ranking timeline for John Spencer
	1968/ 69	1969/ 70	1970/ 71	1971/ 72	1972/ 73	1973/ 74	1974/ 75	1975/ 76	1976/ 77	1977/ 78	1978/ 79	1979/ 80	1980/ 81	1981/ 82	1982/ 83	1983/ 84	1984/ 85	1985/ 86	1986/ 87	1987/ 88	1988/ 89	1989/ 90	1990/ 91	1991/ 92	1992/ 93	1993/ 94	Ref.
Ranking	No ranking system								8	2	4	4	15	14	12	16	13	20	34	28	27	39	56	85	155	296	

Ranking tournament performances for John Spencer
Tournament	1968/ 69	1969/ 70	1970/ 71	1971/ 72	1972/ 73	1973/ 74	1974/ 75	1975/ 76	1976/ 77	1977/ 78	1978/ 79	1979/ 80	1980/ 81	1981/ 82	1982/ 83	1983/ 84	1984/ 85	1985/ 86	1986/ 87	1987/ 88	1988/ 89	1989/ 90	1990/ 91	1991/ 92	Ref.
Hong Kong Open (Note: The event was called the Australian Masters (to 1987), Hong Kong Open (1989/1990) and Australian Open (1994/1995).)	Tournament Not Held											Non-Ranking Event									NH	1R	Not Held		
Dubai Classic (Note: The event was also called the Dubai Masters (1988/1989).)	Tournament Not Held																				NR	2R	LQ	WD	
International Open (Note: The event was also called the Goya Matchroom Trophy (1985/1986).)	Tournament Not Held													NR	2R	QF	1R	2R	1R	2R	3R	LQ	Not Held		
Grand Prix (Note: The event was also called the Professional Players Tournament (1982/1983–1983/1984).)	Tournament Not Held														3R	2R	1R	1R	1R	1R	2R	LQ	LQ	WD	
Canadian Masters (Note: The event was also called the Canadian Open (1978/1979–1980/1981).)	Tournament Not Held						Non-Ranking							Tournament Not Held				Non-Ranking			1R	Not Held			
UK Championship	Tournament Not Held									Non-Ranking Event							1R	2R	3R	1R	1R	1R	LQ	LQ	
Classic	Tournament Not Held											Non-Ranking Event				2R	1R	1R	2R	2R	1R	LQ	LQ	WD	
Asian Open (Note: The event was called the Thailand Masters (1983/1984–1986/1987 & 1991/1992), and the Asian Open (1989/1990–1992/1993).)	Tournament Not Held															Non-Ranking Event				Not Held		1R	LQ	WD	
British Open (Note: The event was also called the British Gold Cup (1979/1980), Yamaha Organs Trophy (1980/1981) and International Masters (1981/1982–1983/1984).)	Tournament Not Held											Non-Ranking Event					2R	1R	QF	3R	1R	1R	LQ	LQ	
European Open	Tournament Not Held																				WD	1R	LQ	LQ	
World Championship	Non-Ranking Event					2R	QF	QF	W	1R	1R	2R	2R	2R	2R	2R	1R	1R	LQ	LQ	LQ	LQ	LQ	LQ	

Non-ranking tournament performances for John Spencer
Tournament	1968/ 69	1969/ 70	1970/ 71	1971/ 72	1972/ 73	1973/ 74	1974/ 75	1975/ 76	1976/ 77	1977/ 78	1978/ 79	1979/ 80	1980/ 81	1981/ 82	1982/ 83	1983/ 84	1984/ 85	1985/ 86	1986/ 87	1987/ 88	1988/ 89	1989/ 90	1990/ 91	1991/ 92	Ref.
World Championship	W	SF	W	F	SF	Ranking Event																			
Pot Black	F	W	W	??	??	F	??	W	??	??	??	??	A	A	A	F	??	A	Tournament Not Held					A	
The Masters	Tournament Not Held						W	SF	QF	SF	QF	SF	SF	1R	A	QF	QF	A	A	A	A	A	LQ	A	
Irish Masters (Note: The event was also called the Benson & Hedges Ireland Tournament (1974/1975–1976/1977).)	Tournament Not Held						W	W	A	W	SF	RR	1R	1R	A	A	A	A	A	A	A	A	A	A	
Professional Snooker League (Note: The event was later called the Matchroom League.)	Tournament Not Held															7th	Not Held		A	A	A	A	A	A	
Pontins Professional	Tournament Not Held					F	F	SF	W	F	RR	QF	A	A	A	F	F	QF	A	A	A	A	A	A	
Park Drive 2000 (Spring)	Not Held		W	W	Tournament Not Held																				
Stratford Professional	Not Held		A	W	F	Tournament Not Held																			
Park Drive 2000 (Autumn)	Not Held			F	W	Tournament Not Held																			
Men of the Midlands	Not Held			F	RR	Tournament Not Held																			
World Masters	Tournament Not Held						F	Tournament Not Held																	
Norwich Union Open	Tournament Not Held					W	W	Tournament Not Held																	
Watney Open	Tournament Not Held						SF	Tournament Not Held																	
Canadian Club Masters	Tournament Not Held							SF	Tournament Not Held																
Dry Blackthorn Cup	Tournament Not Held									SF	Tournament Not Held														
Holsten Lager International	Tournament Not Held										W	Tournament Not Held													
Forward Chemicals Tournament	Tournament Not Held										F	Tournament Not Held													
Limosin International	Tournament Not Held											F	Tournament Not Held												
Padmore Super Crystalate	Tournament Not Held											SF	Tournament Not Held												
Bombay International	Tournament Not Held										W	SF	Tournament Not Held												
Canadian Masters	Tournament Not Held						A	QF	W	F	A	A	2R	Tournament Not Held				A	A	A	R	Not Held			
International Open	Tournament Not Held													2R	Ranking Event								Not Held		
Highland Masters	Tournament Not Held													F	Tournament Not Held										
Classic	Tournament Not Held											W	QF	QF	SF	Ranking Event									
Pontins Brean Sands	Tournament Not Held														SF	Tournament Not Held									
Australian Masters	Tournament Not Held											A	W	F	RR	1R	A	A	A	A	NH	R	Not Held		
UK Championship	Tournament Not Held									2R	2R	2R	1R	1R	QF	2R	Ranking Event								
British Open	Tournament Not Held											RR	LQ	LQ	RR	LQ	Ranking Event								
KitKat Break for World Champions	Tournament Not Held																	QF	Tournament Not Held						
English Professional Championship	Tournament Not Held												QF	Not Held			1R	2R	1R	1R	1R	Not Held			
European Grand Masters	Tournament Not Held																						QF	NH	
World Seniors Championship	Tournament Not Held																							1R	

Performance Table Legend for results
LQ	lost in the qualifying draw	#R	lost in the early rounds of the tournament (WR = Wildcard round, RR = Round robin)	QF	lost in the quarter-finals
SF	lost in the semi-finals	F	lost in the final	W	won the tournament
??	no reliable source available	A	did not participate in the tournament	WD	withdrew from the tournament

Performance Table Legend abbreviations for tournament status
NH / Not Held	means an event was not held.
NR / Non-Ranking Event	means an event is/was no longer a ranking event.
R / Ranking Event	means an event is/was a ranking event.

== Career finals ==
=== Ranking finals: 1 (1 title) ===
Ranking event final contested by John Spencer
Outcome	Year	Championship	Opponent in the final	Score	Ref.
Winner	1977	World Snooker Championship (3)	Cliff Thorburn (CAN)	25–21	

=== Non-ranking finals: 51 (31 titles) ===
Non-ranking finals contested by John Spencer
Outcome	Number	Year	Championship	Opponent in the final	Score	Ref.
Winner	1.	1969	World Snooker Championship (Note: The World Championship did not become a ranking event until 1974.)	Gary Owen (WAL)	46–27	
Runner-up	1.	1969	Pot Black	Ray Reardon (WAL)	0–1	
Winner	2.	1970	Pot Black	Ray Reardon (WAL)	1–0	
Winner	3.	1971	World Snooker Championship (2) (Note: The World Championship did not become a ranking event until 1974.)	Warren Simpson (AUS)	37–29	
Winner	4.	1971	Pot Black (2)	Fred Davis (ENG)	1–0	
Winner	5.	1971	Park Drive 2000 – Spring	Rex Williams (ENG)	4–1	
Runner-up	2.	1971	Park Drive 600	Ray Reardon (WAL)	0–4	
Winner	6.	1971	Stratford Professional	David Taylor (ENG)	5–2	
Runner-up	3.	1971	Park Drive 2000 – Autumn	Ray Reardon (WAL)	3–4	
Runner-up	4.	1972	Men of the Midlands	Alex Higgins (NIR)	2–4	
Winner	7.	1972	Park Drive 2000 – Spring	Alex Higgins (NIR)	4–3	
Runner-up	5.	1972	Castle Professional	Alex Higgins (NIR)	Round–Robin	
Runner-up	6.	1972	World Snooker Championship (Note: The World Championship did not become a ranking event until 1974.)	Alex Higgins (NIR)	31–37	
Runner-up	7.	1972	Stratford Professional	Alex Higgins (NIR)	3–6	
Winner	8.	1972	Park Drive 2000 – Autumn	Alex Higgins (NIR)	5–3	
Winner	9.	1972	Scottish Professional Tournament	John Pulman (ENG)	5–1	
Winner	10.	1973	Norwich Union Open	John Pulman (ENG)	8–7	
Winner	11.	1973	Coventry Invitation	Ray Reardon (WAL)	5–0	
Winner	12.	1973	Castle Professional – Event 1	Alex Higgins (NIR)	Round–Robin	
Winner	13.	1974	Ladbrokes Gala Event	Ray Edmonds (ENG)	3–2	
Runner-up	8.	1974	Pot Black (2)	Graham Miles (ENG)	Aggregate score (Note: The winning aggregate score (combined points scored across two frames) was 147–86.)	
Runner-up	9.	1974	Pontins Professional	Ray Reardon (WAL)	9–10	
Winner	14.	1974	World Plate Championship	John Pulman (ENG)	15–5	
Runner-up	10.	1974	World Masters	Cliff Thorburn (CAN)	Aggregate score (Note: The winning aggregate score (combined points scored across two frames) was 160–67.)	
Winner	15.	1974	Norwich Union Open (2)	Ray Reardon (WAL)	10–9	
Winner	16.	1974	Jackpot Automatics	Alex Higgins (NIR)	5–0	
Winner	17.	1974	Willie Smith Trophy	David Taylor (ENG)	15–5	
Winner	18.	1975	The Masters	Ray Reardon (WAL)	9–8	
Winner	19.	1975	Benson & Hedges Ireland Tournament	Alex Higgins (NIR)	9–7	
Runner-up	11.	1975	Pontins Professional (2)	Ray Reardon (WAL)	4–10	
Winner	20.	1975	Ashton Court Country Club Event	Alex Higgins (NIR)	5–1	
Winner	21.	1975	Champion of Champions	(England) Graham Miles	5–4	
Winner	22.	1976	Benson & Hedges Ireland Tournament (2)	Alex Higgins (NIR)	5–0	
Winner	23.	1976	Pot Black (3)	Dennis Taylor (NIR)	1–0	
Winner	24.	1976	Canadian Open	Alex Higgins (NIR)	17–9	
Winner	25.	1977	Pontins Professional	John Pulman (ENG)	7–5	
Runner-up	12.	1977	Canadian Open	Alex Higgins (NIR)	14–17	
Winner	26.	1978	Irish Masters (3)	Doug Mountjoy (WAL)	5–3	
Winner	27.	1978	Castle Professional	Alex Higgins (NIR)	5–3	
Runner-up	13.	1978	Pontins Professional (3)	Ray Reardon (WAL)	2–7	
Runner-up	14.	1979	Forward Chemicals Tournament	Ray Reardon (WAL)	6–9	
Winner	28.	1979	Holsten Lager International	Graham Miles (ENG)	11–7	
Winner	29.	1979	Bombay International	Dennis Taylor (NIR)	Round-robin	
Runner-up	15.	1979	Limosin International	Eddie Charlton (AUS)	19–23	
Winner	30.	1980	The Classic	Alex Higgins (NIR)	4–3	
Winner	31.	1980	Australian Masters	Dennis Taylor (NIR)	Aggregate score (Note: The winning aggregate score is not mentioned in The Hamlyn Encyclopedia of Snooker, Snooker: Records, Facts and Champions, or The CueSport Book of Professional Snooker: The Complete Record & History.)	
Runner-up	16.	1981	Australian Masters	Tony Meo (ENG)	Aggregate score	
Runner-up	17.	1982	Highland Masters	Ray Reardon (WAL)	4–9	
Runner-up	18.	1984	Pot Black (3)	Terry Griffiths (WAL)	1–2	
Runner-up	19.	1984	Pontins Professional (4)	Willie Thorne (ENG)	7–9	
Runner-up	20.	1985	Pontins Professional (5)	Terry Griffiths (WAL)	7–9	

=== Pro-am finals: 3 (1 title) ===
Pro-am finals contested by John Spencer
Outcome	No.	Year	Championship	Opponent in the final	Score	Ref.
Runner-up	1.	1974	Pontins Spring Open	Doug Mountjoy (WAL)	4–7	
Runner-up	2.	1975	Castle Open	Alex Higgins (NIR)	2–5	
Winner	1.	1978	Warners Open	Tony Knowles (ENG)	7–4	

=== Team finals: 3 (1 title) ===
Team finals contested by John Spencer
Outcome	No.	Year	Championship	Team/partner	Opponent in the final	Score	Ref.
Runner-up	1.	1975	Ladbroke International	England (Note: The England team was Rex Williams, Fred Davis, Graham Miles, John Spencer and John Pulman.)	Rest of the World (Note: The "Rest of the World" team was Cliff Thorburn (Canada), Ray Reardon (Wales), Eddie Charlton (Australia), Alex Higgins (Northern Ireland) and Jackie Rea (Northern Ireland).)	Cumulative score	
Runner-up	2.	1979	World Challenge Cup	England (Note: The England team was Spencer, Fred Davis and Graham Miles)	Wales (Note: The Wales team was Ray Reardon, Terry Griffiths and Doug Mountjoy)	3–14	
Winner	1.	1981	World Team Classic	England (Note: The England team was Steve Davis, Spencer and David Taylor)	Wales (Note: The Wales team was Ray Reardon, Terry Griffiths and Doug Mountjoy)	4–3	

=== Amateur finals: 4 (1 title) ===
Amateur finals contested by John Spencer
Outcome	No.	Year	Championship	Opponent in the final	Score	Ref.
Runner-up	1.	1964	English Amateur Championship	Ray Reardon (WAL)	8–11	
Runner-up	2.	1965	English Amateur Championship (2)	Pat Houlihan (ENG)	3–11	
Winner	1.	1966	English Amateur Championship	Marcus Owen (WAL)	11–5	
Runner-up	3.	1966	World Amateur Championship	Gary Owen (WAL)	Round-robin	
