= 1973–74 snooker season =

Details
- Duration: July 1973 – May 1974
- Tournaments: 5 (non-ranking)

Triple Crown winners
- World Championship: (Wales) Ray Reardon

The 1973–74 snooker season was a series of snooker tournaments played between July 1973 and May 1974. The following table outlines the results for the season's events.

== Calendar ==
Date (Note: Dates use the mm-dd date format.)			Rank	Tournament name	Venue	City	Winner	Runner-up	Score	Reference
07-23	08-22	AUS	NR	Australian Professional Championship	Wagga RSL Club	Wagga Wagga	(Australia) Eddie Charlton	(Wales) Gary Owen	31–10	
11–24	11–29	ENG	NR	Norwich Union Open	Piccadilly Hotel	London	(England) John Spencer	(England) John Pulman	8–7	
11–30	12–01	ENG	NR	Coventry Invitation	Standard Triumph Social Club	Coventry	(England) John Spencer	(Wales) Ray Reardon	5–0	
01-??	01-??	ENG	NR	Pot Black	BBC Studios	Birmingham	(England) Graham Miles	(England) John Spencer	1–0	
03-??	03-??	ENG	NR	Willie Smith Trophy	Northern Snooker Centre	Leeds	(England) John Spencer	(England) David Taylor	15–5	
04–16	04–25	ENG	NR	World Snooker Championship	Belle Vue Stadium	Manchester	(Wales) Ray Reardon	(England) Graham Miles	22–12	
05–04	05–11	WAL	NR	Pontins Professional	Pontins	Prestatyn	(Wales) Ray Reardon	(England) John Spencer	10–9	
