= 1971–72 snooker season =

Details
- Duration: March 1971 – April 1972
- Tournaments: 8 (non-ranking)

Triple Crown winners
- World Championship: (Northern Ireland) Alex Higgins

The 1971–72 snooker season was a series of snooker tournaments played between March 1971 and April 1972. The following table outlines the results for the season's events.

== Calendar ==
Date (Note: Dates use the mm-dd date format.)			Rank	Tournament name	Venue	City	Winner	Runner-up	Score	Reference
04-28	04-29	ENG	NR	Park Drive 600	St Phillips Social Club	Sheffield	(Wales) Ray Reardon	(England) John Spencer	4–0	
05-17	05-19	AUS	NR	Hunter Valley Championship	Maitland Leagues Club	Maitland	(Australia) Eddie Charlton	(Australia) Warren Simpson	5–4	
05-??	06-??	ENG	NR	Willie Smith Trophy	East Ward Liberal Club	Leeds	(Northern Ireland) Alex Higgins	(England) John Dunning	25–13	
09-17		ENG	NR	Stratford Professional	Wilmcote Working Men's Club	Wilmcote	(England) John Spencer	(England) David Taylor	5–2	
10–04	10–31	ENG	NR	Park Drive 2000 (October 1971)		Various	(Wales) Ray Reardon	(England) John Spencer	4–3	
11–08	11–30	AUS	NR	Australian Professional Championship	Junior Rugby League Club	Sydney	(Australia) Eddie Charlton	(Australia) Warren Simpson	15–7	
12–29	01-01	ENG	NR	Pot Black	BBC Studios	Birmingham	(Australia) Eddie Charlton	(Wales) Ray Reardon	1–0	
01–03	01–08	NIR	NR	Irish Professional Championship		Various	(Northern Ireland) Alex Higgins	(Northern Ireland) Jackie Rea	28–12	
01–31	02–20	ENG	NR	Park Drive 2000 (Spring 1972)		Various	(England) John Spencer	(Northern Ireland) Alex Higgins	4–3	
03–01	02–26	ENG	NR	World Snooker Championship	Selly Park British Legion	Birmingham	(Northern Ireland) Alex Higgins	(England) John Spencer	37–31	(Note: Some sources give the score as 37–32. The CueSport Book of Professional Snooker: The Complete Record & History (2004) says "Higgins triumphed 37–31 (not 37–32 as so many publications have wrongly printed).")
01–03	03–20	ENG	NR	Men Of The Midlands		Various	(Northern Ireland) Alex Higgins	(England) John Spencer	4–2	
