= 1968–69 snooker season =

Details
- Duration: July 1968 – March 1969
- Tournaments: 4 (non-ranking)

Triple Crown winners
- World Championship: (England) John Spencer

The 1968–69 snooker season, the first season of the modern era of snooker, was a series of snooker tournaments played between July 1968 and March 1969. The following table outlines the results for the season's events.

== New professional players ==
The following players turned professional during the season: Maureen Baynton, Bernard Bennett, Maurice Parkin, David Taylor,Graham Miles Ron Gross, Pat Houlihan, and John Dunning.

== Calendar ==
Date (Note: Dates use the mm-dd date format.)			Rank	Tournament name	Venue	City	Winner	Runner-up	Score	Reference
07-24	07-29	AUS	NR	World Open Match Play Snooker Championship	St George Leagues Club	Sydney	(Australia) Eddie Charlton	(England) Rex Williams	43–30	
07–29	08–14	AUS	NR	Australian Professional Championship	Junior Rugby League Club	Sydney	(Australia) Warren Simpson	(Australia) Eddie Charlton	11–10	
01-??	01-??	ENG	NR	Pot Black	BBC Studios	Birmingham	(Wales) Ray Reardon	(England) John Spencer	1–0	
11–18	03–22	ENG	NR	World Snooker Championship	Victoria Hall	London	(England) John Spencer	(Wales) Gary Owen	37–24	
