= 1970–71 snooker season =

Details
- Duration: July 1970 – January 1971
- Tournaments: 6 (non-ranking)

Triple Crown winners
- World Championship: (England) John Spencer

The 1970–71 snooker season was a series of snooker tournaments played between July 1970 and January 1971. The following table outlines the results for the season's events.

== Calendar ==
Date (Note: Dates use the mm-dd date format.)			Rank	Tournament name	Venue	City	Winner	Runner-up	Score	Ref.
07–13	07–15	ENG	NR	Chester Professional Tournament	Upton-By-Chester British Legion	Chester	(Northern Ireland) Jackie Rea	(England) John Spencer	4–3 (Note: Winning margin achieved at 4–1)	
07-26	08-30	AUS	NR	Australian Professional Championship	Heiron and Smith	Sydney	(Australia) Eddie Charlton	(Australia) Warren Simpson	RR	
09-04		ENG	NR	Stratford Professional		Stratford-upon-Avon	(Wales) Gary Owen	(Wales) Ray Reardon	6–4	
09–28	11–07	AUS	NR	World Snooker Championship		Various	(England) John Spencer	(Australia) Warren Simpson	37–29	
01-??	01-??	ENG	NR	Pot Black	BBC Studios	Birmingham	(England) John Spencer	(England) Fred Davis	1–0	
01–04	01–31	ENG	NR	Park Drive 2000 (January 1971)		Various	(England) John Spencer	(England) Rex Williams	4–1	
