= 1979 Forward Chemicals Tournament =

Forward Chemicals Tournament
Tournament information
- Dates: 23 October 1978 – 28 January 1979
- Venue: Royal Exchange Theatre
- City: Manchester
- Country: England
- Organisation: WPBSA
- Format: Non-ranking event
- Winner's share: £3,000

Final
- Champion: (Wales) Ray Reardon
- Runner-up: (England) John Spencer
- Score: 9–6

The 1979 Forward Chemicals Tournament was a non-ranking snooker tournament held on one occasion between October 1978 and January 1979.

Similar in format to previous Park Drive 2000 events, four professionals played each other three times in a round-robin format at various venues around the country, with the two best performing players reaching the final. Held at the Royal Exchange Theatre in Manchester, Ray Reardon defeated John Spencer 9–6 in the final.

== Main draw ==
=== Round-robin ===
Player 1	Score	Player 2
(Northern Ireland) Alex Higgins	5–3	(England) John Spencer
(Northern Ireland) Alex Higgins	5–3	(Wales) Ray Reardon
(Northern Ireland) Alex Higgins	5–4	(Wales) Doug Mountjoy
(Wales) Doug Mountjoy	5–1	(England) John Spencer
(Wales) Doug Mountjoy	5–2	(England) John Spencer
(Wales) Doug Mountjoy	5–3	(Northern Ireland) Alex Higgins
(Wales) Doug Mountjoy	5–3	(Northern Ireland) Alex Higgins
(Wales) Ray Reardon	5–0	(Wales) Doug Mountjoy
(Wales) Ray Reardon	5–1	(Wales) Doug Mountjoy
(Wales) Ray Reardon	5–2	(Wales) Doug Mountjoy
(Wales) Ray Reardon	5–3	(England) John Spencer
(Wales) Ray Reardon	5–3	(Northern Ireland) Alex Higgins
(Wales) Ray Reardon	5–3	(Northern Ireland) Alex Higgins
(England) John Spencer	5–0	(Northern Ireland) Alex Higgins
(England) John Spencer	5–3	(Wales) Ray Reardon
(England) John Spencer	5–3	(Northern Ireland) Alex Higgins
(England) John Spencer	5–4	(Wales) Ray Reardon
(England) John Spencer	5–4	(Wales) Doug Mountjoy

=== Knockout stage ===
Final; Best of 17 frames
1	(Wales) Ray Reardon	9
2	(England) John Spencer	6
