= 1984 Pontins Professional =

Tournament information
- Dates: 12–19 May 1984
- Venue: Pontin's
- City: Prestatyn
- Country: Wales
- Organisation: WPBSA
- Format: Non-Ranking event
- Total prize fund: £12,000
- Winner's share: £3,500

Final
- Champion: (England) Willie Thorne
- Runner-up: (England) John Spencer
- Score: 9–7

The 1984 Pontins Professional was the eleventh edition of the professional invitational snooker tournament which took place between 12 and 19 May 1984 at Pontin's in Prestatyn, Wales.

The tournament featured eight professional players. The quarter-final matches were contested over the best of 9 frames, the semi-final matches over the best of 13 frames, and the final over the best of 17 frames.

Willie Thorne won the event, beating John Spencer 9–7 in the final.

== Main draw ==
Quarter-finals; Best of 9 frames
(England) Willie Thorne	5
(Wales) Terry Griffiths	2
(England) Tony Knowles	5
(Wales) Cliff Wilson	0
(England) John Spencer	5
(Wales) Doug Mountjoy	1
(Wales) Ray Reardon	5
(South Africa) Silvino Francisco	3

Semi-finals; Best of 13 frames
(England) Willie Thorne	7
(England) Tony Knowles	5
(England) John Spencer	7
(Wales) Ray Reardon	6

Final; Best of 17 frames
(England) Willie Thorne	9
(England) John Spencer	7
