= Stratford Professional =

Tournament information
- Location: Stratford-upon-Avon
- Country: England
- Established: 1970
- Format: Non-ranking event
- Final year: 1972
- Final champion: (Northern Ireland) Alex Higgins

The Stratford Professional was a non-ranking snooker tournament held on three occasions from 1970 to 1972.

The first tournament, played on 4 September 1970, was won by Gary Owen, who defeated Ray Reardon 6–4. Owen achieved a top break of 66, while Reardon's high break was 54. The following year featured two different finalists, with John Spencer defeating David Taylor 5–2 at Wilmcote Men's Club. Spencer also had the highest break of the match, with 91. The third edition took place the following year at Wootton Wawen Social Club, with Spencer attempting to defend his title against Alex Higgins. Although Spencer made the highest break of 77, Higgins won 6–3.

== Winners ==
Year	Winner	Runner-up	Final score	Season
1970	(Wales) Gary Owen	(Wales) Ray Reardon	6–4	1970/71
1971	(England) John Spencer	(England) David Taylor	5–2	1971/72
1972	(Northern Ireland) Alex Higgins	(England) John Spencer	6–3	1972/73
