= 1982 Highland Masters =

Highland Masters
Tournament information
- Dates: 16–18 April 1982
- Venue: Eden Court Theatre
- City: Inverness
- Country: Scotland
- Organisation: WPBSA
- Format: Non-ranking event
- Winner's share: £5,000

Final
- Champion: (Wales) Ray Reardon
- Runner-up: (England) John Spencer
- Score: 11–4

The 1982 Highland Masters was a professional invitational snooker tournament, which took place between 16 and 18 April 1982 at the Eden Court Theatre in Inverness, Scotland.

Ray Reardon won the tournament beating John Spencer 11–4 in the final.

== Main draw ==
Quarter-finals; Best of 7 frames		Semi-finals; Best of 11 frames		Final; Best of 21 frames
(Wales) Ray Reardon	4
(Scotland) Bert Demarco	3	(Wales) Ray Reardon	6
(England) Steve Davis	4	(England) Steve Davis	0
(Scotland) Matt Gibson	3			(Wales) Ray Reardon	11
(England) John Spencer	4			(England) John Spencer	4
(Scotland) Murdo MacLeod	0	(England) John Spencer	6
(Northern Ireland) Alex Higgins	4	(Northern Ireland) Alex Higgins	0
(Scotland) Eddie Sinclair	3
