= 1974 Norwich Union Open =

Tournament information
- Dates: 18–22 November 1974
- Venue: Piccadilly Hotel
- City: London
- Country: England
- Organisation: WPBSA
- Format: Invitational event
- Total prize fund: £4,750
- Winner's share: £1,500
- Highest break: (Wales) Ray Reardon (130)

Final
- Champion: (England) John Spencer
- Runner-up: (Wales) Ray Reardon
- Score: 10–9

The 1974 Norwich Union Open was the second edition of the invitational snooker tournament, which took place between 18 and 22 November 1974 at the Piccadilly Hotel in London. It was open to both professionals and amateurs and featured 16 players. Reigning champion John Spencer won 10–9 in the final against Ray Reardon.

== Prize fund ==
The breakdown of prize money for this year is shown below:

- Winner: £1,500
- Runner-up: £750
- Semi-final: £400
- Quarter-final: £200
- Last 16: £100
- Highest break: £100
- Total: £4,750

== Main draw ==
Round 1 Best of 9 frames
(England) John Spencer	5
(England) Ray Edmonds	0
(England) Graham Miles	5
(Scotland) Eddie Sinclair	0
(Canada) Cliff Thorburn	5
(England) Fred Davis	4
(England) John Pulman	5
(Wales) Geoff Thomas	0
(Northern Ireland) Alex Higgins	5
(Northern Ireland) Dennis Taylor	1
(Canada) Bill Werbeniuk	5
(England) John Dunning	1
(England) Rex Williams	5
(Wales) Marcus Owen	3
(Wales) Ray Reardon	5
(Republic of Ireland) Pascal Burke	2

Quarter-finals; Best of 9 frames
(England) John Spencer	5
(England) Graham Miles	2
(Canada) Cliff Thorburn	5
(England) John Pulman	3
(Northern Ireland) Alex Higgins	5
(Canada) Bill Werbeniuk	4
(Wales) Ray Reardon	5
(England) Rex Williams	2

Semi-finals; Best of 17 frames
(England) John Spencer	9
(Canada) Cliff Thorburn	7
(Wales) Ray Reardon	9
(Northern Ireland) Alex Higgins	8

Final; Best of 19 frames
(England) John Spencer	10
(Wales) Ray Reardon	9
