= 1973 Norwich Union Open =

Tournament information
- Dates: 24–29 November 1973
- Venue: Piccadilly Hotel
- City: London
- Country: England
- Organisation: WPBSA
- Format: Invitational event
- Total prize fund: £3,500
- Winner's share: £1,000

Final
- Champion: (England) John Spencer
- Runner-up: (England) John Pulman
- Score: 8–7

The 1973 Norwich Union Open was an invitational snooker tournament which took place between 24 and 29 November 1973 at the Piccadilly Hotel in London. It was open to both professionals and amateurs and featured 24 players. John Spencer won 8–7 in the final against John Pulman.

== Prize fund ==
The breakdown of prize money for this year is shown below:

- Winner: £1,000
- Runner-up: £500
- Third place: £300
- Fourth place: £200
- Quarter-final: £125
- Last 16: £75
- Last 24: £50
- Total: £3,500

== Main draw ==
Round 1 Best of 7 frames
(England) John Dunning	4
(England) Jim Meadowcroft	0
(England) Jonathan Barron	4
(England) Ron Gross	2
(Northern Ireland) Dennis Taylor	4
(Wales) Alwyn Lloyd	1
(England) Pat Houlihan	4
(England) John Virgo	3
(England) David Taylor	4
(England) Jack Karnehm	2
(India) Arvind Savur	4
(England) David Greaves	2
(Scotland) Chris Ross	4
(Wales) Marcus Owen	3
(England) Sid Hood	4
(Northern Ireland) Jackie Rea	0

Round 2 Best of 7 frames
(England) John Spencer	4
(England) John Dunning	3
(England) Ray Edmonds	4
(England) Jonathan Barron	3
(Northern Ireland) Alex Higgins	4
(Northern Ireland) Dennis Taylor	3
(Canada) Cliff Thorburn	4
(England) Pat Houlihan	0
(England) John Pulman	4
(England) David Taylor	3
(England) Graham Miles	4
(India) Arvind Savur	1
(Australia) Eddie Charlton	4
(Scotland) Chris Ross	0
(England) Sid Hood	4
(South Africa) Manuel Francisco	3

Quarter-finals; Best of 7 frames
(England) John Spencer	4
(England) Ray Edmonds	0
(Northern Ireland) Alex Higgins	4
(Canada) Cliff Thorburn	2
(England) John Pulman	4
(England) Graham Miles	3
(Australia) Eddie Charlton	4
(England) Sid Hood	0

Semi-finals; Best of 15 frames
(England) John Spencer	8
(Northern Ireland) Alex Higgins	2
(England) John Pulman	8
(Australia) Eddie Charlton	3

Final; Best of 15 frames
(England) John Spencer	8
(England) John Pulman	7

- Eddie Charlton defeated Alex Higgins 8–5 in the third-place playoff.
