= 1985 Pontins Professional =

Tournament information
- Dates: 11–18 May 1985
- Venue: Pontin's
- City: Prestatyn
- Country: Wales
- Organisation: WPBSA
- Format: Non-Ranking event
- Total prize fund: £12,000
- Winner's share: £3,500

Final
- Champion: (Wales) Terry Griffiths
- Runner-up: (England) John Spencer
- Score: 9–7

The 1985 Pontins Professional was the twelfth edition of the professional invitational snooker tournament which took place between 11 and 18 May 1985 at Pontin's in Prestatyn, Wales.

The tournament featured eight professional players. The quarter-final matches were contested over the best of 9 frames, the semi-final matches over the best of 11 frames, and the final over the best of 17 frames.

Terry Griffiths won the event for the second time, beating John Spencer 9–7 in the final.

== Main draw ==
Quarter-finals; Best of 9 frames
(Wales) Terry Griffiths	5
(Wales) Cliff Wilson	1
(England) Willie Thorne	5
(England) John Parrott	3
(England) John Spencer	5
(England) John Virgo	4
(Wales) Ray Reardon	5
(England) Neal Foulds	1

Semi-finals; Best of 13 frames
(Wales) Terry Griffiths	7
(England) Willie Thorne	5
(England) John Spencer	7
(Wales) Ray Reardon	3

Final; Best of 17 frames
(Wales) Terry Griffiths	9
(England) John Spencer	7
