= 1976–77 snooker season =

Details
- Duration: September 1976 – 7 May 1977
- Tournaments: 8 (1 ranking event)

Triple Crown winners
- Masters: (Wales) Doug Mountjoy
- World Championship: (England) John Spencer

The 1976–77 snooker season was a series of snooker tournaments played between September 1976 and May 1977. The following table outlines the results for the ranking and the invitational events.

== New professionals ==
John Virgo was accepted by the World Professional Billiards and Snooker Association as a professional player at the Association's July 1976 meeting. Doug Mountjoy, Roy Andrewartha and Chris Ross all became professionals after competing in the 1976 World Amateur Snooker Championship in October, which Mountjoy won. Patsy Fagan joined the professional ranks in October.

== Calendar ==
Date (Note: Dates use the mm-dd date format.)			Rank	Tournament name	Venue	City	Winner	Runner-up	Score	Reference
09-??	09-??	AUS	NR	Australian Professional Championship	Dandenong Football Club	Melbourne	(Australia) Eddie Charlton	(Australia) Paddy Morgan	w/o–w/d	
09-??	09-??	CAN	NR	Canadian Open	Canadian National Exhibition Stadium	Toronto	(England) John Spencer	(Northern Ireland) Alex Higgins	17–9	
11–28	12–11	AUS	NR	World Professional Match-play Championship	Nunawading Basketball Centre	Melbourne	(Australia) Eddie Charlton	(Wales) Ray Reardon	31–24	
01-??	01-??	ENG	NR	Pot Black	BBC Studios	Birmingham	(South Africa) Perrie Mans	(Wales) Doug Mountjoy	1–0	
02–07	02–11	ENG	NR	The Masters	New London Theatre	London	(Wales) Doug Mountjoy	(Wales) Ray Reardon	7–6	
02–17	02–18	IRL	NR	Benson & Hedges Ireland Tournament	Leopardstown Racecourse	Dublin	(Northern Ireland) Alex Higgins	(Wales) Ray Reardon	5–3	
04–18	04–30	ENG	WR	World Snooker Championship	Crucible Theatre	Sheffield	(England) John Spencer	(Canada) Cliff Thorburn	25–21	
04–30	05–07	WAL	NR	Pontins Professional	Pontins	Prestatyn	(England) John Spencer	(England) John Pulman	7–5	

WR = World ranking event
NR = Non-ranking event

== Official rankings ==
The top 16 of the world rankings.

No.	Ch. (Note: Indicates a relation to the Order of Merit used during the 1975/1976 season.)	Name	Points
1	Steady	(Wales) Ray Reardon	15
2	▲	(Northern Ireland) Alex Higgins	9
3	▼	(Australia) Eddie Charlton	8
4	▲	(England) Fred Davis	6
5	Steady	(England) Graham Miles	6
6	▼	(England) Rex Williams	6
7	▲	(South Africa) Perrie Mans	5
8	▼	(England) John Spencer	5
9	Steady	(Northern Ireland) Dennis Taylor	5
10	▼	(Wales) Gary Owen	4
11	▲	(England) John Dunning	4
12	▲	(England) Jim Meadowcroft	3
13	▼	(Canada) Cliff Thorburn	3
14	Steady	(Canada) Bill Werbeniuk	3
15	▼	(England) John Pulman	3
16	Steady	(England) David Taylor	2
