= Park Drive 2000 =

Tournament information
- Location: Various
- Country: England
- Established: 1971
- Format: Invitational event
- Final year: 1972
- Final champion: (England) John Spencer

The Park Drive 2000 was a series of invitational snooker tournaments staged between 1971 and 1972. All four editions were sponsored by Park Drive cigarettes. The four invited players played each other in a round-robin, with the top two then contesting a final. The winner of the final received prize money of £750 and the runner up received £550.

John Spencer won three of the tournaments, with Ray Reardon winning the other. Each final was recorded and shown on BBC Grandstand. The highest break in any of the matches was a 146 compiled by Reardon in the Spring 1972 event.

== Winners ==
Year	Winner	Runner-up	Final score	Season
1971 (January)	(England) John Spencer	(England) Rex Williams	4–1	1970/71
1971 (October)	(Wales) Ray Reardon	(England) John Spencer	4–3	1971/72
1972 (Spring)	(England) John Spencer	(Northern Ireland) Alex Higgins	4–3	1971/72
1972 (Autumn)	(England) John Spencer	(Northern Ireland) Alex Higgins	5–3	1972/73

== 1971 (January) ==
The event was played between four invited professionals, as a triple round-robin. Matches were played across 18 club venues, with the final placing below. As the top two players in the round-robin, Spencer and Williams played each other in the final, which was televised by the BBC. Spencer won the final 4–1.

	Played	Won	Lost	Prize money
John Spencer	9	8	1	£750
Rex Williams	9	5	4	£550
Gary Owen	9	5	4	£400
John Pulman	9	0	9	£300

== 1971 (October) ==
The event took place at venues throughout England between 2 and 31 October 1971 and was played between four invited professionals, as a triple round-robin. Ray Reardon, who had not been able to participate in the January event as he had been on a tour of South Africa, was included. As the top two players in the round-robin, Spencer and Reardon played each other in the final which took place at the RAFA Club, Manchester, with Reardon winning 4–3. Reardon had needed Spencer to concede points from a foul shot when only the pink and black were left in the deciding frame, to obtain enough points to win.

	Played	Won	Lost	Prize money
John Spencer	9	7	2	£550
Ray Reardon	9	4	5	£750
John Pulman	9	4	5	£400
Rex Williams	9	3	6	£300

== 1972 (Spring) ==
The event was played between four invited professionals, as a triple round-robin. Reardon made a break of 146 in the round-robin stage, which was the highest-ever break in competitive play until overtaken by Spencer's maximum break at the 1979 Holsten Lager International. Alex Higgins, playing in his first major professional tournament, came second in the round robin rankings and lost 3–4 to Spencer. The following day, the same two players played the start of the week-long final of the 1972 World Snooker Championship.

	Played	Won	Lost	Prize money
John Spencer	9	6	3	£750
Alex Higgins	9	5	4	£550
John Pulman	9	4	5	£400
Ray Reardon	9	3	6	£300

== 1972 (Autumn) ==
The event took place at venues throughout England between 27 September and 29 October 1972 and was played between four invited professionals, as a triple round-robin. Spencer finished behind Higgins in the round-robin standings, but beat him 5–3 in the final. The final was held at Belle Vue, Manchester, in front of 2,000 spectators.

	Played	Won	Lost	Prize money
Alex Higgins	9	7	2	£550
John Spencer	9	6	3	£750
Ray Reardon	9	3	6	£400
John Pulman	9	2	7	£300
