= 1980 Classic (1979/1980) =

Wilson's Classic
Tournament information
- Dates: 7–8 January 1980
- Venue: New Century Hall
- City: Manchester
- Country: England
- Organisation: WPBSA
- Format: Non-Ranking event
- Total prize fund: £9,500
- Winner's share: £3,000
- Highest break: Alex Higgins (NIR) (75)

Final
- Champion: (England) John Spencer
- Runner-up: (Northern Ireland) Alex Higgins
- Score: 4–3

The 1980 Wilson's Classic (January) was the inaugural edition of the professional invitational snooker tournament, which took place on 7 and 8 January 1980. The tournament was played at the New Century Hall in Manchester, and featured eight professional players.

John Spencer won the tournament, beating Alex Higgins 4–3 in the final. A second Classic was staged in 1980 in December with Steve Davis winning the title.

Higgins made the highest break of the tournament, 75, during the final.

== Prize fund ==
The breakdown of prize money for this year is shown below:

- Winner: £3,000
- Runner-up: £1,500
- Semi-final: £1,000
- Quarter-final: £600
- Highest break: £600
- Total: £9,500

== Main draw ==
Quarter-finals; Best of 3 frames		Semi-finals; Best of 3 frames		Final; Best of 7 frames
(Wales) Terry Griffiths	2
(England) Jim Meadowcroft	0	(Wales) Terry Griffiths	0
(Northern Ireland) Alex Higgins	2	(Northern Ireland) Alex Higgins	2
(Northern Ireland) Dennis Taylor	0			(Northern Ireland) Alex Higgins	3
(England) John Spencer	2			(England) John Spencer	4
(England) Graham Miles	0	(England) John Spencer	2
(England) John Virgo	2	(England) John Virgo	0
(Wales) Doug Mountjoy	0

== Final ==
Final: Best of 7 frames. Referee: Jim Thorpe. New Century Hall, Manchester, England, 8 January 1980.
Alex Higgins; Northern Ireland	3–4	John Spencer; England
46–64, 50–51, 102–39, 97(75)–19, 70 (52)–26, 29–67, 90(52)–30
75	Highest break	52
0	Century breaks	0
2	50+ breaks	1
