= 1977 Canadian Open =

Canadian Open
Tournament information
- Dates: 17 August – 5 September 1977
- Venue: Canadian National Exhibition Stadium
- City: Toronto
- Country: Canada
- Organisation: WPBSA
- Format: Non-ranking event
- Total prize fund: $15,000
- Winner's share: $6,000
- Highest break: John Spencer (ENG) (146)

Final
- Champion: (Northern Ireland) Alex Higgins
- Runner-up: (England) John Spencer
- Score: 17–14

The 1977 Canadian Open was the fourth edition of the professional invitational snooker tournament, the Canadian Open, which took place between 17 August and 5 September 1977.

Alex Higgins won the title defeating John Spencer 17–14 in the final.

== Main draw ==
Last 16; Best of 17 frames
(Northern Ireland) Alex Higgins | 9
(Canada) John Dillon | 1
(Canada) Cliff Thorburn | 9
(Canada) Eddy Agha | 1
(Wales) Ray Reardon | 9
(Canada) Kirk Stevens | 6
(Canada) Stan Holden | 9
(England) John Pulman | 6
(England) John Spencer | 9
(Canada) Mario Morra | 3
(Canada) Kevin Robitaille | 9
(Wales) Doug Mountjoy | 8
(Northern Ireland) Dennis Taylor | 9
(Canada) Jim Wych | 8
(Canada) Bill Werbeniuk | 9
(England) Willie Thorne | 7

Quarter-finals; Best of 17 frames
(Northern Ireland) Alex Higgins | 9
(Canada) Cliff Thorburn | 6
(Wales) Ray Reardon | 9
(Canada) Stan Holden | 2
(England) John Spencer | 9
(Canada) Kevin Robitaille | 3
(Northern Ireland) Dennis Taylor | 9
(Canada) Bill Werbeniuk | 7

Semi-finals; Best of 17 frames
(Northern Ireland) Alex Higgins | 9
(Wales) Ray Reardon | 7
(England) John Spencer | 9
(Northern Ireland) Dennis Taylor | 6

Final; Best of 33 frames
(Northern Ireland) Alex Higgins | 17
(England) John Spencer | 14
