= 1978 Pontins Professional =

Tournament information
- Dates: 29 April – 6 May 1978
- Venue: Pontin's
- City: Prestatyn
- Country: Wales
- Organisation: WPBSA
- Format: Non-ranking event

Final
- Champion: (Wales) Ray Reardon
- Runner-up: (England) John Spencer
- Score: 7–2

The 1978 Pontins Professional was the fifth edition of the professional invitational snooker tournament which took place from April to May 1978 in Prestatyn, Wales.

The tournament featured twelve professional players. Two players advance to the final while the other ten were eliminated in the group stage. All frames were played during the group stage matches.

Ray Reardon won the event, beating John Spencer 7–2 in the final.

== Group stage ==
- (England) Fred Davis 4–1 Alex Higgins (Northern Ireland)
- (England) Fred Davis 4–1 Perrie Mans (South Africa)
- (Republic of Ireland) Patsy Fagan 3–2 Graham Miles (England)
- (Republic of Ireland) Patsy Fagan 3–2 Ray Reardon (Wales)
- (Northern Ireland) Alex Higgins 3–2 Cliff Thorburn (Canada)
- (South Africa) Perrie Mans 4–1 Alex Higgins (Northern Ireland)
- (South Africa) Perrie Mans 4–1 Rex Williams (England)
- (England) Graham Miles 3–2 Doug Mountjoy (Wales)
- (England) Graham Miles 4–1 John Pulman (England)
- (Wales) Doug Mountjoy 4–1 Dennis Taylor (Northern Ireland)
- (Wales) Doug Mountjoy 4–1 John Pulman (England)
- (Wales) Doug Mountjoy 4–1 Patsy Fagan (Republic of Ireland)
- (England) John Pulman 3–2 Patsy Fagan (Republic of Ireland)
- (Wales) Ray Reardon 3–2 Dennis Taylor (Northern Ireland)
- (Wales) Ray Reardon 4–1 Doug Mountjoy (Wales)
- (Wales) Ray Reardon 4–1 John Pulman (England)
- (Wales) Ray Reardon 5–0 Graham Miles (England)
- (England) John Spencer 3–2 Fred Davis (England)
- (England) John Spencer 3–2 Perrie Mans (South Africa)
- (England) John Spencer 4–1 Alex Higgins (Northern Ireland)
- (England) John Spencer 4–1 Cliff Thorburn (Canada)
- (England) John Spencer 4–1 Rex Williams (England)
- (Northern Ireland) Dennis Taylor 3–2 Patsy Fagan (Republic of Ireland)
- (Northern Ireland) Dennis Taylor 4–1 Graham Miles (England)
- (Northern Ireland) Dennis Taylor 5–0 John Pulman (England)
- (Canada) Cliff Thorburn 3–2 Fred Davis (England)
- (Canada) Cliff Thorburn 3–2 Rex Williams (England)
- (Canada) Cliff Thorburn 4–1 Perrie Mans (South Africa)
- (England) Rex Williams 3–2 Fred Davis (England)
- (England) Rex Williams 4–1 Alex Higgins (Northern Ireland)

== Final ==
- (Wales) Ray Reardon 7–2 John Spencer (England)
