= 1971 Park Drive 600 =

Professional snooker tournament

Park Drive 600
Tournament information
- Dates: 28–29 April 1971
- Venue: St Phillips Social Club
- City: Sheffield
- Country: England
- Format: Invitational event
- Total prize fund: £600
- Winner's share: £600

Final
- Champion: Ray Reardon (WAL)
- Runner-up: John Spencer (ENG)
- Score: 4–0

The Park Drive 600 was an invitational professional snooker tournament, which took place on 28 and 29 April 1971 at the St Phillips Social Club in Sheffield with six professional players participating. Reardon claimed the title with a 4–0 victory against Spencer in the final, making a break of 127 during the match.

There was £600 prize money for the winner, on a "winner takes all" basis. Additionally, there was a prize of £1 per point for the highest break achieved. The tournament was broadcast on Yorkshire Television in weekly programmes.

The first round matches and semi-finals were each decided on the aggregate score across three frames. Pulman defeated Rea by 10 points after taking the last three colours in their second frame, and Williams eliminated Davis by winning 184–165 on the final pink ball. In the first semi-final, Spencer won 228–134 against Pulman.

== Main draw ==
Players in bold denote match winners.

**First round** Aggregate score over three frames
**John Pulman (ENG)** | **180**
Jackie Rea (NIR) | 170
Fred Davis (ENG) | 165
**Rex Williams (ENG)** | **184**

**Semi-finals**; Aggregate score over three frames
**John Spencer (ENG)** | **228**
John Pulman (ENG) | 134
**Ray Reardon (WAL)** | unknown
Rex Williams (ENG) | unknown

**Final**; Best of 7 frames
John Spencer (ENG) | 0
**Ray Reardon (WAL)** | **4**
