= 1975 Pontins Professional =

Tournament information
- Dates: May 1975
- Venue: Pontin's
- City: Prestatyn
- Country: Wales
- Organisation: WPBSA
- Format: Non-Ranking event
- Total prize fund: £2,500
- Winner's share: £1,000

Final
- Champion: (Wales) Ray Reardon
- Runner-up: (England) John Spencer
- Score: 10–4

The 1975 Pontins Professional was the second edition of the professional invitational snooker tournament which took place in May 1975 in Prestatyn, Wales.

The tournament featured eight professional players. The quarter-final and semi-final matches were contested over the best of 13 frames, and the final was the best of 19 frames.

Ray Reardon won the event, beating John Spencer 10–4 in the final.

== Prize money ==
The winner of the event received £1,000 from a total prize pool of £2,500. The breakdown of prize money for the event is shown below:

- Winner: £1,000
- Runner-up: £500
- Semi-finals: £250
- Quarter-finals: £125
- Total: £2,500

== Main draw ==
Quarter-finals; Best of 13 frames
(Wales) Ray Reardon	7
(England) Graham Miles	6
(Canada) Cliff Thorburn	7
(England) Fred Davis	3
(England) John Spencer	7
(Northern Ireland) Dennis Taylor	4
(England) Rex Williams	7
(England) John Pulman	6

Semi-finals; Best of 13 frames
(Wales) Ray Reardon	7
(Canada) Cliff Thorburn	5
(England) John Spencer	7
(England) Rex Williams	5

Final; Best of 19 frames
(Wales) Ray Reardon	10
(England) John Spencer	4
