= 1976 Canadian Open =

Canadian Open
Tournament information
- Dates: September 1976
- Venue: Canadian National Exhibition Stadium
- City: Toronto
- Country: Canada
- Organisation: WPBSA
- Format: Non-ranking event

Final
- Champion: (England) John Spencer
- Runner-up: (Northern Ireland) Alex Higgins
- Score: 17–9

The 1976 Canadian Open was the third edition of the professional invitational snooker tournament, the Canadian Open, which took place in September 1976.

John Spencer won the title defeating Alex Higgins 17–9 in the final.

== Main draw ==
Last 16; Best of 17 frames
(England) John Spencer	9
(Canada) Denis McColgan	1
(Canada) Winnie McKinlay	9
(England) Willie Thorne	8
(England) John Virgo	9
(Canada) Stan Holden	6
(Canada) Cliff Thorburn	9
(Canada) Eddy Agha	1
(Northern Ireland) Alex Higgins	9
(Canada) Kirk Stevens	4
(Canada) Bill Werbeniuk	9
(Canada) Paul Lanning	6
(Canada) Bernie Mikkelsen	9
(England) David Greaves	6
(England) John Pulman	9
(Canada) Mario Morra	4

Quarter-finals; Best of 17 frames
(England) John Spencer	9
(Canada) Winnie McKinlay	2
(England) John Virgo	9
(Canada) Cliff Thorburn	5
(Northern Ireland) Alex Higgins	9
(Canada) Bill Werbeniuk	3
(Canada) Bernie Mikkelsen	9
(England) John Pulman	8

Semi-finals; Best of 17 frames
(England) John Spencer	9
(England) John Virgo	4
(Northern Ireland) Alex Higgins	9
(Canada) Bernie Mikkelsen	1

Final; Best of 33 frames
(England) John Spencer	17
(Northern Ireland) Alex Higgins	9
