= 1979 Bombay International =

Bombay International
Tournament information
- Dates: 10–14 February 1979
- Venue: Bombay Gymkhana
- City: Bombay
- Country: India
- Organisation: WPBSA
- Format: Non-ranking event
- Winner's share: £2,000

Final
- Champion: (England) John Spener
- Runner-up: (Northern Ireland) Dennis Taylor

The 1979 Garware Paints Bombay International was a professional invitational snooker tournament held in February 1979 in Bombay (modern-day Mumbai), India. This was the first professional snooker tournament to be held in India.

Six professionals played in a round-robin format, with John Spencer emerging as the winner.

== Main draw ==
| Player 1 | Score | Player 2 |
|---|---|---|
| (Republic of Ireland) Patsy Fagan | 6–2 | (Canada) Cliff Thorburn |
| (Republic of Ireland) Patsy Fagan | 6–4 | (India) Arvind Savur |
| (England) Graham Miles | 6–0 | (Republic of Ireland) Patsy Fagan |
| (England) Graham Miles | 6–3 | (Northern Ireland) Dennis Taylor |
| (India) Arvind Savur | 6–3 | (Northern Ireland) Dennis Taylor |
| (India) Arvind Savur | 6–4 | (England) Graham Miles |
| (England) John Spencer | 6–1 | (India) Arvind Savur |
| (England) John Spencer | 6–3 | (Canada) Cliff Thorburn |
| (England) John Spencer | 6–4 | (Republic of Ireland) Patsy Fagan |
| (England) John Spencer | 6–5 | (England) Graham Miles |
| (Northern Ireland) Dennis Taylor | 6–2 | (Republic of Ireland) Patsy Fagan |
| (Northern Ireland) Dennis Taylor | 6–5 | (England) John Spencer |
| (Northern Ireland) Dennis Taylor | 6–5 | (Canada) Cliff Thorburn |
| (Canada) Cliff Thorburn | 6–2 | (India) Arvind Savur |
| (Canada) Cliff Thorburn | 6–4 | (England) Graham Miles |
