= 1974 Pontins Professional =

Tournament information
- Dates: 4–11 May 1974
- Venue: Pontin's
- City: Prestatyn
- Country: Wales
- Organisation: WPBSA
- Format: Non-Ranking event
- Total prize fund: £2,500
- Winner's share: £1,000

Final
- Champion: (Wales) Ray Reardon
- Runner-up: (England) John Spencer
- Score: 10–9

The 1974 Pontins Professional was the first edition of the professional invitational snooker tournament which took place in May 1974 in Prestatyn, Wales.

The tournament featured eight professional players. The quarter-final matches were contested over the best of 13 frames, the semi-final matches over 15 frames, and the final was the best of 19 frames.

Ray Reardon won the event, beating John Spencer 10–9 in the final.

== Prize money ==
The winner of the event received £1,000 from a total prize pool of £2,500. The breakdown of prize money for the event is shown below:

- Winner: £1,000
- Runner-up: £500
- Semi-finals: £250
- Quarter-finals: £125
- Total: £2,500

== Main draw ==
Quarter-finals; Best of 13 frames
(Wales) Ray Reardon	7
(England) Fred Davis	4
(Canada) Cliff Thorburn	7
(Northern Ireland) Jackie Rea	2
(England) John Spencer	7
(Australia) Eddie Charlton	5
(England) Rex Williams	7
(England) John Pulman	6

Semi-finals; Best of 15 frames
(Wales) Ray Reardon	8
(Canada) Cliff Thorburn	5
(England) John Spencer	8
(England) Rex Williams	4

Final; Best of 19 frames
(Wales) Ray Reardon	10
(England) John Spencer	9
