= 1978 Irish Masters =

Irish Masters
Tournament information
- Dates: 8–10 March 1978
- Venue: Goffs
- City: Kill
- Country: Ireland
- Organisation: WPBSA
- Format: Non-Ranking event
- Total prize fund: £3,100
- Winner's share: £1,000
- Highest break: Alex Higgins (NIR) (108)

Final
- Champion: (England) John Spencer
- Runner-up: (Wales) Doug Mountjoy
- Score: 5–3

The 1978 Irish Masters was the fourth edition of the professional invitational snooker tournament (and the first under the Irish Masters name) which took place from 8 to 10 March 1978. The tournament was played at Goffs in Kill, County Kildare, and featured six professional players. The first round was played in two groups : Reardon, Spencer and Miles in Group A, Higgins, Mountjoy and Dennis Taylor in Group B. John Spencer won the title for the third time, beating Doug Mountjoy 5–3 in the final.

== Main draw ==
RR play-off 1 frame		Semi-finals; Best of 5 frames		Final; Best of 9 frames
		(England) John Spencer	3
(Northern Ireland) Alex Higgins	1	(Northern Ireland) Alex Higgins	1
(Northern Ireland) Dennis Taylor	0			(England) John Spencer	5
				(Wales) Doug Mountjoy	3
		(Wales) Doug Mountjoy	3
		(Wales) Ray Reardon	2
