= 1976 Benson & Hedges Ireland Tournament =

Benson & Hedges Ireland Tournament
Tournament information
- Dates: 21 February 1976
- Venue: National Boxing Stadium
- City: Dublin
- Country: Ireland
- Organisation: WPBSA
- Format: Non-ranking event
- Total prize fund: £1,300
- Winner's share: £600
- Highest break: (Northern Ireland) Dennis Taylor (115)

Final
- Champion: (England) John Spencer
- Runner-up: (Northern Ireland) Alex Higgins
- Score: 5–0

The 1976 Benson & Hedges Ireland Tournament was the second edition of the professional invitational snooker tournament and took place on 21 February 1976. While the previous edition was a challenge match between John Spencer and Alex Higgins, this year the tournament was expanded to four professional players, with Graham Miles and Dennis Taylor also participating. The prize fund was £1,300, with £600 going to the winner and £300 to the runner-up.

John Spencer won the title, defeating Alex Higgins 5–0 in the final. Dennis Taylor had the highest break of 115 which earned him an extra £100 in addition to his £100 prize for finishing fourth. Graham Miles earned £200 in prize money.

== Main draw ==
Semi-finals; Best of 7 frames		Final; Best of 9 frames
(England) John Spencer	4
(England) Graham Miles	2	(England) John Spencer	5
(Northern Ireland) Alex Higgins	4	(Northern Ireland) Alex Higgins	0
(Northern Ireland) Dennis Taylor	1

Third-place match

- (England) Graham Miles 4–1 Dennis Taylor (Northern Ireland)
