= Hamilton Bland =

British swimming commentator

Hamilton Bland (born 1943) was a leading BBC swimming commentator, once known as the "Voice of Swimming".

Bland originally worked at Rugby School before he became the chief coach to the British Olympic swimming team from 1968 to 1972.

Bland was employed as a swimming commentator by the BBC from 1975 to 1998. He was dropped from the role due to allegations of corruption arising from his employment by the Amateur Swimming Association (ASA) as Facilities Advisor. In this position Bland advised bodies such as councils who were planning construction or development of swimming pools, as an example Bland worked as swimming consultant on the Ponds Forge pool in Sheffield. It was alleged that Bland took secret commissions from suppliers who were then recommended by him in his position as facilities advisor. The ASA sacked Bland after they found him guilty of bringing the sport of swimming into disrepute, although Bland himself denies any wrongdoing.

Bland then set up a company (Sportizus Ltd) dealing in celebrity memorabilia which, although initially successful, eventually went into administration in 2006. He now works as a public speaker.

In 2011 Bland won a court case against Coventry City Council claiming that his Mercedes had been damaged by potholes.
