= 1974 World Masters =

Tournament information
- Dates: 1–5 July 1974
- Venue: Victorian Club
- City: South Yarra, Melbourne
- Country: Australia
- Format: Non-ranking event
- Total prize fund: AUD20,000

Final
- Champion: Cliff Thorburn (CAN)
- Runner-up: John Spencer (ENG)
- Score: Aggregate Score (160–67)

The 1974 World Masters was a professional non-ranking snooker tournament held from 1 to 5 July 1974 at the Victorian Club in South Yarra, Melbourne, Australia. Cliff Thorburn won the title by defeating John Spencer 160–67 in the final. Thorburn, aged 26, was the youngest player in the event and the 8th seed.

The tournament started on 1 July. The eight players were divided into two round-robin groups to produce semi-finalists, with the semi-finals and final played on 5 July. The total prize fund was AUD20,000.

John Spencer beat Perrie Mans in the first semi-final, whilst Cliff Thorburn beat Eddie Charlton in the other semi-final.

The final was decided on the aggregate score across two frames. Thorburn led 81–29 after the first frame, and 160–67 at the conclusion, to win the title.

== Seedings ==
Players were seeded as follows:

1. Ray Reardon (WAL)
2. Eddie Charlton (AUS)
3. John Spencer (ENG)
4. Rex Williams (ENG)
5. John Pulman (ENG)
6. Gary Owen (WAL)
7. Perrie Mans (RSA)
8. Cliff Thorburn (CAN)

== Group matches ==
Players in bold are match winners; "??" denotes that the result is missing.

Division 1

Date	Player	Score	Player	Ref.
1 July	**Gary Owen (WAL)**	**54**–53	Rex Williams (ENG)	
1 July	**Cliff Thorburn (CAN)**	**88**–52	Eddie Charlton (AUS)	
2 July	Eddie Charlton (AUS)	??	Gary Owen (WAL)	
2 July	**Cliff Thorburn (CAN)**	**61**–52	Rex Williams (ENG)	
4 July	Cliff Thorburn (CAN)	??	Gary Owen (WAL)	
4 July	**Eddie Charlton (AUS)**	**120**-13	Rex Williams (ENG)	

Division 2

Date	Player	Score	Player	Ref.
1 July	**John Spencer (ENG)**	**80**–39	Perrie Mans (RSA)	
1 July	**Ray Reardon (WAL)**	**92**–19	John Pulman (ENG)	
2 July	**John Spencer (ENG)**	**77**–38	Ray Reardon (WAL)	
2 July	John Pulman (ENG)	??	Perrie Mans (RSA)	
4 July	**Perrie Mans (RSA)**	**79**-15	Ray Reardon (WAL)	
4 July	John Pulman (ENG)	??	John Spencer (ENG)	
