= 1979 Holsten Lager International =

Holsten Lager International
Tournament information
- Dates: 14–17 January 1979
- Venue: Fulcrum Centre
- City: Slough
- Country: England
- Organisation: WPBSA
- Format: Non-ranking event
- Winner's share: £3,500
- Highest break: (England) John Spencer (147)

Final
- Champion: (England) John Spencer
- Runner-up: (England) Graham Miles
- Score: 11–7

The 1979 Holsten Lager International was a non-ranking snooker tournament held on one occasion in January 1979 in Slough, England.

The tournament had an unusual format. There were sixteen players in a straight knockout but the first round was decided by aggregate scores over four frames and the second by aggregate over six frames. The semi finals and final were ‘Best of 11’ and ‘Best of 21’ respectively.

The quarter final between John Spencer and Cliff Thorburn is how the event is best remembered. In the afternoon session, Spencer made the first ever 147 in a professional tournament. As it was the afternoon, the TV cameras were not running and the pockets were not measured to check conformity, so the break was never officially ratified for record purposes. Spencer went on to beat Graham Miles 11–7 in the final.

== Main draw ==
Last 16; Aggregate score (4 frames)
(England) John Spencer	206
(Republic of Ireland) Patsy Fagan	185
(Canada) Cliff Thorburn	206
(Wales) Doug Mountjoy	110
(England) Rex Williams	180
(Canada) Bill Werbeniuk	166
(Wales) Ray Reardon	221
(England) Ray Edmonds	112
(England) Graham Miles	235
(England) John Pulman	118
(Northern Ireland) Dennis Taylor	217
(England) Fred Davis	151
(Northern Ireland) Alex Higgins	233
(Australia) Eddie Charlton	138
(England) David Taylor	241
(South Africa) Perrie Mans	182

Quarter-finals; Aggregate score (6 frames)
(England) John Spencer	467
(Canada) Cliff Thorburn	296
(England) Rex Williams	364
(Wales) Ray Reardon	362
(England) Graham Miles	395
(Northern Ireland) Dennis Taylor	340
(Northern Ireland) Alex Higgins	391
(England) David Taylor	300

Semi-finals; Best of 11 frames
(England) John Spencer	6
(England) Rex Williams	2
(England) Graham Miles	6
(Northern Ireland) Alex Higgins	3

Final; Best of 21 frames
(England) John Spencer	11
(England) Graham Miles	7
