= 1969 Pot Black =

Tournament information
- Dates: 23 July – 10 September 1969 (broadcast)
- Venue: BBC Studios
- City: Birmingham
- Country: England
- Organisation: WPBSA
- Format: Non-ranking event
- Highest break: (Wales) Ray Reardon (99)

Final
- Champion: (Wales) Ray Reardon
- Runner-up: (England) John Spencer
- Score: 88–29

The 1969 Pot Black event was the first edition of the professional invitational snooker tournament, which was broadcast in July, August and September 1969. This first recording of Pot Black took place at the BBC TV Studios in Gosta Green, Birmingham, a converted turn-of-the-century cinema. Later it was recorded at the new Pebble Mill Studios in Birmingham which replaced the Gosta Green Studios. The event featured eight professional players. All matches were one-frame shoot-outs.

Broadcasts were on BBC2, starting with an introductory programme at 8:50 pm on Wednesday 23 July 1969. The first match, between John Spencer and Jackie Rea, was broadcast on 30 July, followed by weekly broadcasts until the final on 10 September. The programmes were presented by Keith Macklin with Ted Lowe as the commentator.

Ray Reardon won the event, beating John Spencer 88–29 in the one-frame final, and received the BBC2 Pot Black Trophy.

== Main draw ==
Quarter-finals		Semi-finals		Final
(England) John Spencer	1
(Northern Ireland) Jackie Rea	0	(England) John Spencer	1
(England) Rex Williams	0	(England) Kingsley Kennerley	0
(England) Kingsley Kennerley	1			(England) John Spencer	29
(England) John Pulman	1			(Wales) Ray Reardon	88
(Wales) Gary Owen	0	(England) John Pulman	0
(England) Fred Davis	26	(Wales) Ray Reardon	1
(Wales) Ray Reardon	83

Match dates of transmission

Player 1	Player 2	Broadcast Date
(England) John Spencer	(Northern Ireland) Jackie Rea	30 July 1969
(England) Kingsley Kennerley	(England) Rex Williams	6 August 1969
(England) John Pulman	(Wales) Gary Owen	13 August 1969
(Wales) Ray Reardon	(England) Fred Davis	20 August 1969
(England) John Spencer	(England) Kingsley Kennerley	27 August 1969
(Wales) Ray Reardon	(England) John Pulman	3 September 1969
(Wales) Ray Reardon	(England) John Spencer	10 September 1969
