= Gosta Green =

- District
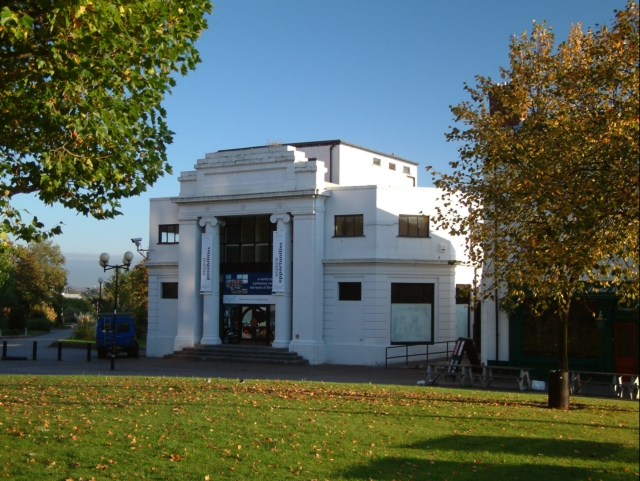
- Gosta Green Arts Centre in 2005
- Interactive map of Gosta Green
- Coordinates: 52.48806°N 1.88803°W
- Country: England
- City: Birmingham

Gosta Green shown within the West Midlands
(grid reference SP077878)

Gosta Green is an area in the city of Birmingham, England. It lies at the edge of the city centre, 3/4 mile (1.2 kilometres) northeast of Birmingham New Street station.

== University ==
Gosta Green is the home of the Aston University campus. The campus is also adjacent to the Aston Science Park.

== Pubs ==
There are two pubs – the "Gosta Green" on Great Lister Street, and "The Sacks of Potatoes" near Aston Street. The "Gosta Green" pub was originally called the "Pot of Beer". During the 1980s and early 1990s, it was a venue for indie music. Bands who performed at the pub include Pop Will Eat Itself and Blur. It later became a Scream pub; part of the Firkin chain, known as the "Faculty and Firkin" in the late 1990s. The Pub has recently been changed (2015) from being a Scream pub to the Common Room brand owned by Stonegate. It is now called the 'Gosta Green'.

== History ==
Historically Gosta Green ('Gosty Green') was part of the parish of Aston.

Probably named from its holding by William de Gorsty in the early 14th century. It was known as Gostie Green by the mid 18th century, the name being a corruption of Gorsty to gorse (i.e. gorse bushes, locally called 'goss', which were common nearby).

The Green was actually two greens by the mid 18th century; Lower Gorsty Green being the larger, encircled by a road.

It was the location of Bishop Ryder Memorial Church from 1838 to 1960.

Methodist preacher John Wesley was roughly handled while preaching on Gosta Green. In 1840, the Chartists Lovett and Collins, directly on their release from prison, gave speeches to 30,000 people on Gosta Green.

The Gosta Green Gun Quarter was visited by Queen Victoria in 1858, when it was described as: "the centre of the locality in which the gun-trade carried on", and the local gun-makers guild spent around £6,000 on street decorations.

During the 19th century, until the late 1880s, Gosta Green was the location of a regular market. The surrounding streets were filled with back-to-back houses, small workshops, and a dozen pubs. Only a few pubs now remain to remind visitors of its Victorian past.

Eccles Motor Transport Ltd., a pioneer in the production of automobile pulled caravans, established its Gosta Green factory in 1919.

Gosta Green's Birmingham Arts Lab was formerly the Centre for the Arts as which it had been an important centre for theatre and music in the late 1970s having been established for Aston University by Theatre Organiser Nick Arnold, Music Organiser Tony Pither and Technical Manager Cliff Dix during that decade in the former Delica Cinema (later the BBC Midland television studios before the opening of Pebble Mill in 1971). Following the Lab take over the building became The Triangle Cinema, then the frontage became a Waterstones bookshop. The building has subsequently become the home of the European Bio-Energy Research Institute (EBRI), part of Aston University.
