= Alan Weeks (sports reporter) =

British sports reporter and commentator (1923–1996)

- Born: Alan Frederick Weeks; 8 September 1923; Bristol, England
- Died: 11 June 1996 (aged 72); Hove, East Sussex, England
- Occupations: Television sports broadcaster; Sports commentator
- Years active: 1946–1996
- Employer: BBC
- Spouse: Barbara Jane Huckle (m. 1947–1996)
- Children: 3

Alan Frederick Weeks (8 September 1923 – 11 June 1996) was an English television sports reporter and commentator for the BBC from 1951 to 1996. He was assigned to work as the publicity manager of the Brighton Sports Stadium after he was demobbed from the Royal Naval Reserve in 1946. Three years later, Weeks was discovered by BBC Television outside broadcast producer Peter Dimmock and joined the corporation as a regular sports commentator in 1951. He covered more than 30 sports for the BBC such as ice skating, ice hockey, swimming, gymnastics, football, snooker, the Summer Olympic Games, the Winter Olympic Games and the Commonwealth Games until his retirement in 1996. Weeks was the first director of the Sports Aid Foundation between 1976 and 1983, later serving as an elected governor of the foundation.

== Early life and war service ==
Weeks was born on 8 September 1923 in Bristol, the son of the Captain Frederick Charles Weeks and his wife Ada Frances Weeks. His family moved to Brighton when he was five upon his father becoming piermaster of the Palace Pier because of his deteriorating eyesight. Weeks attended Brighton Hove and Sussex Grammar School. He was a team swimmer and a First XI footballer at school.

When he was 16 years old, Weeks left school to go to sea as a cadet in the British Merchant Navy. He was transferred to the Royal Naval Reserve as a midshipman in 1941, serving his country through the Second World War on the Renown, Rother and Helmsdale. Weeks went through Arctic convoys in Russia and two runs in Malta and warned his crew of an imminent attack through the public address system, before eventually being demobilised in April 1946 as a lieutenant.

== Career ==
He returned to Brighton after he was demobbed, and was assigned to be the publicity manager of the Brighton Sports Stadium by the London-based Tom Arnold entertainments organisation in 1946. Weeks arranged table tennis tournaments, publicised boxing matches, prepared ice shows, and was secretary of the Brighton Tigers Ice Hockey Club. He lost his job when the stadium's ice rink was closed and demolished in 1965.

In 1949, Weeks was heard commentating over the public address system for an ice hockey match on the ice rink by the BBC Television outside broadcast producer Peter Dimmock. He was asked to audition at the BBC by Dimmock, who was impressed by him. Weeks did his audition during the second half of an ice hockey match and was told it would not be broadcast live but be recorded. But he was told to broadcast the third and final period live because of his performance.

Weeks became a regular sports commentator for the BBC in 1951, and commentated on the BBC's first live television broadcast away from the South Coast at the Brighton Ice Circus in 1952 for a one-hour excerpt. He covered more than 30 sports, and was a presenter of Summer Grandstand between 1959 and 1962. In 1974 and 1975, Weeks provided commentary on the BBC1 pantomime from the Empire Pool, Wembley. He reported on every Winter Olympic Games held between 1964 and 1994, every Summer Olympic Games from 1968 to 1988, and the five Commonwealth Games that took place from 1970 to 1986.

Principally remembered for his commentary on winter sports such as ice skating and ice hockey. Weeks also presented swimming from 1971 to 1990, gymnastics from 1962 to 1989, and volleyball. Weeks provided commentary on events such as the Speedway World Championship, Gymnastics World Championships, the World Archery Championships the World Handball Championship. the European Figure Skating Championships and the World Figure Skating Championships. He commented on the memorable gold medal wins of sports stars such as Olga Korbut, Mark Spitz, John Curry, Torvill and Dean and David Wilkie. For all this, he was affectionately nicknamed 'The Gold Medal Commentator' by his peers. Barry Davies took over his gymnastics duties in the Olympics, and Hamilton Bland in swimming. Davies and Weeks continued to commentate in ice-skating together, including the Torvill and Dean comeback at the 1994 Winter Olympics in Lillehammer, before a record audience of 23.9 million viewers in the UK on the BBC - a record audience for a non-football broadcast. In December 1987, Weeks had a massive heart attack. He recovered to report on the 1988 Winter Olympics in Calgary but he was required to reduce his broadcasting commitments as a result.

He commented on football for 23 years. Weeks began working on the Match of the Day football highlights programme as its Midlands-based correspondent in August 1969. Major competitions he covered included five FIFA World Cup final tournaments from 1962 to 1978, and Newcastle United's last trophy win, the second leg of the 1969 Fairs Cup Final against Ujpest Dozja. From 1970 to 1984, Weeks presented the BBC2 snooker series Pot Black, which popularised the game in the country. He presented highlights of the 1978 World Snooker Championship at the Crucible Theatre, Sheffield.

From 1973 to 1974, Weeks was director of the London Lions Ice Hockey Club, the farm team of the Detroit Red Wings of the National Hockey League. He became the first director of the Sports Aid Foundation in January 1976 after being asked to take up the position by Denis Howell, the Minister of Sport. Weeks replaced the businessman and foundation chairman Peter Cadbury, and remained in the post until 1983. He went on to serve as an elected governor of the foundation from October 1983 until 1986. Weeks was the president of the English National League from 1981 to 1982, and was inducted into the British Ice Hockey Hall of Fame in 1988. He chaired the National Ice Skating Association's board of trustees, was president of the Brighton and Hove Entertainment Managers and was a member of both the Lord's Taverners, the cricket charity, and the Amateur Swimming Association. In 1989, British Ice Hockey honoured him by naming the award for Best British Defenceman after him, the Alan Weeks Trophy. Weeks was awarded the SJA Doug Gardner Award for services to Sports Journalism and the SJA in 1995.

He made his last broadcast in March 1996, commentating at the 1996 World Figure Skating Championships in Edmonton, Alberta, after which he announced his retirement.

== Personal life ==
He married Barbara Jane Huckle, a figure skater, on 6 September 1947. They had two sons and one daughter. His daughter Beverley died at the age of 43 in 1992, following serious health problems. Nine years earlier, his son Nigel was found hanged at the age of 28. In 1967, he was cleared of charges of driving under the impairment of drink or drugs in Ewell, Surrey. Weeks died of cancer at his home in Hove, East Sussex early on 11 June 1996 at the age of 72.
