= The Dilly Hotel =

Hotel in London, England

The Dilly London
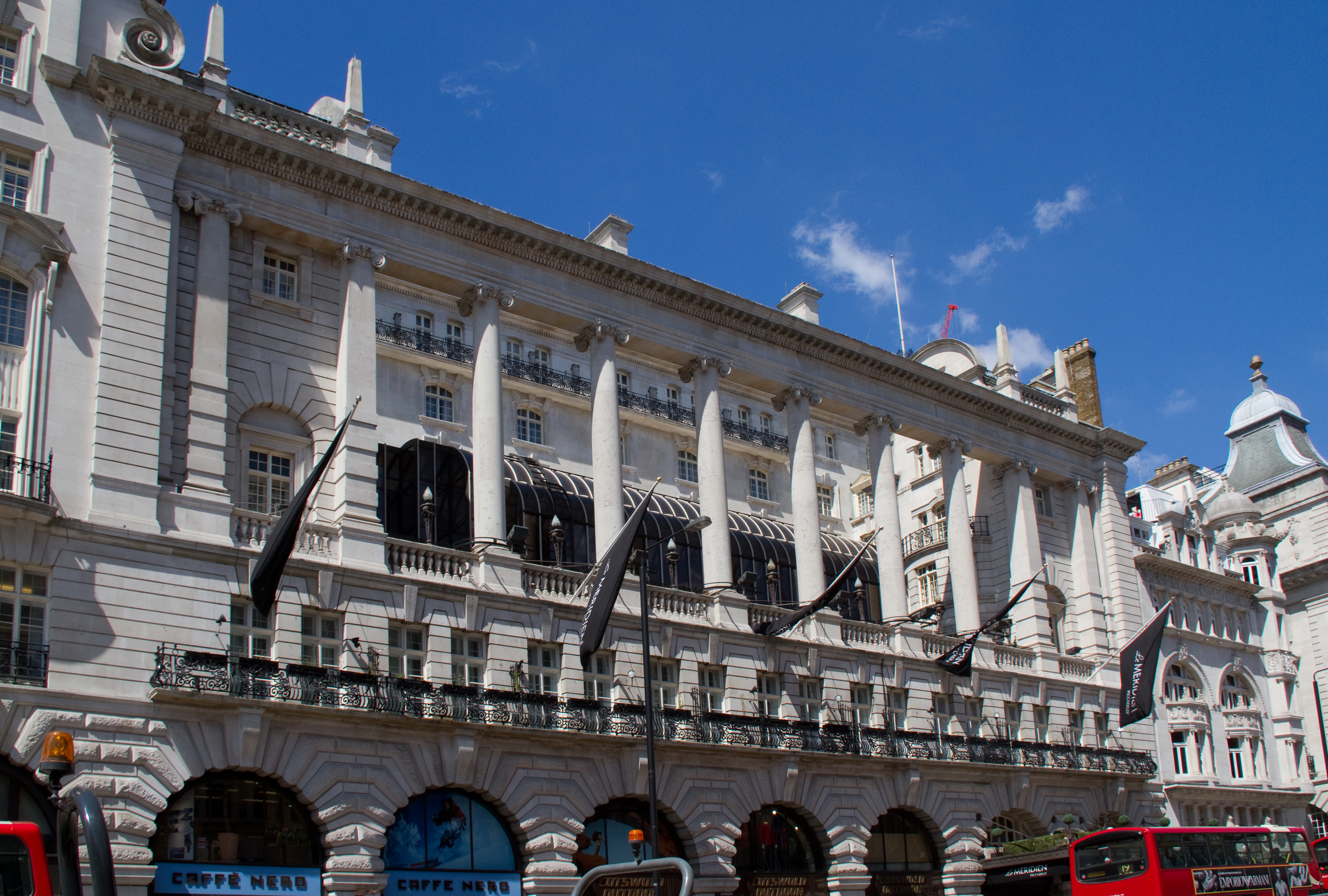
- The hotel's front façade on Piccadilly

- Location within Central London

General information
- Location: 21 Piccadilly, London, England, United Kingdom
- Coordinates: 51°30′33.77″N 0°8′11.54″W
- Opened: 1908; 118 years ago (as The Piccadilly Hotel)
- Owner: Fattal Hotels

Design and construction
- Architect: Richard Norman Shaw

Other information
- Number of rooms: 280
- Number of restaurants: 2
- Number of bars: 1

Website
- thedillylondon.com

The Dilly London, known for over a hundred years as The Piccadilly Hotel, is a historic luxury hotel located at 21 Piccadilly in London, England.

== History ==
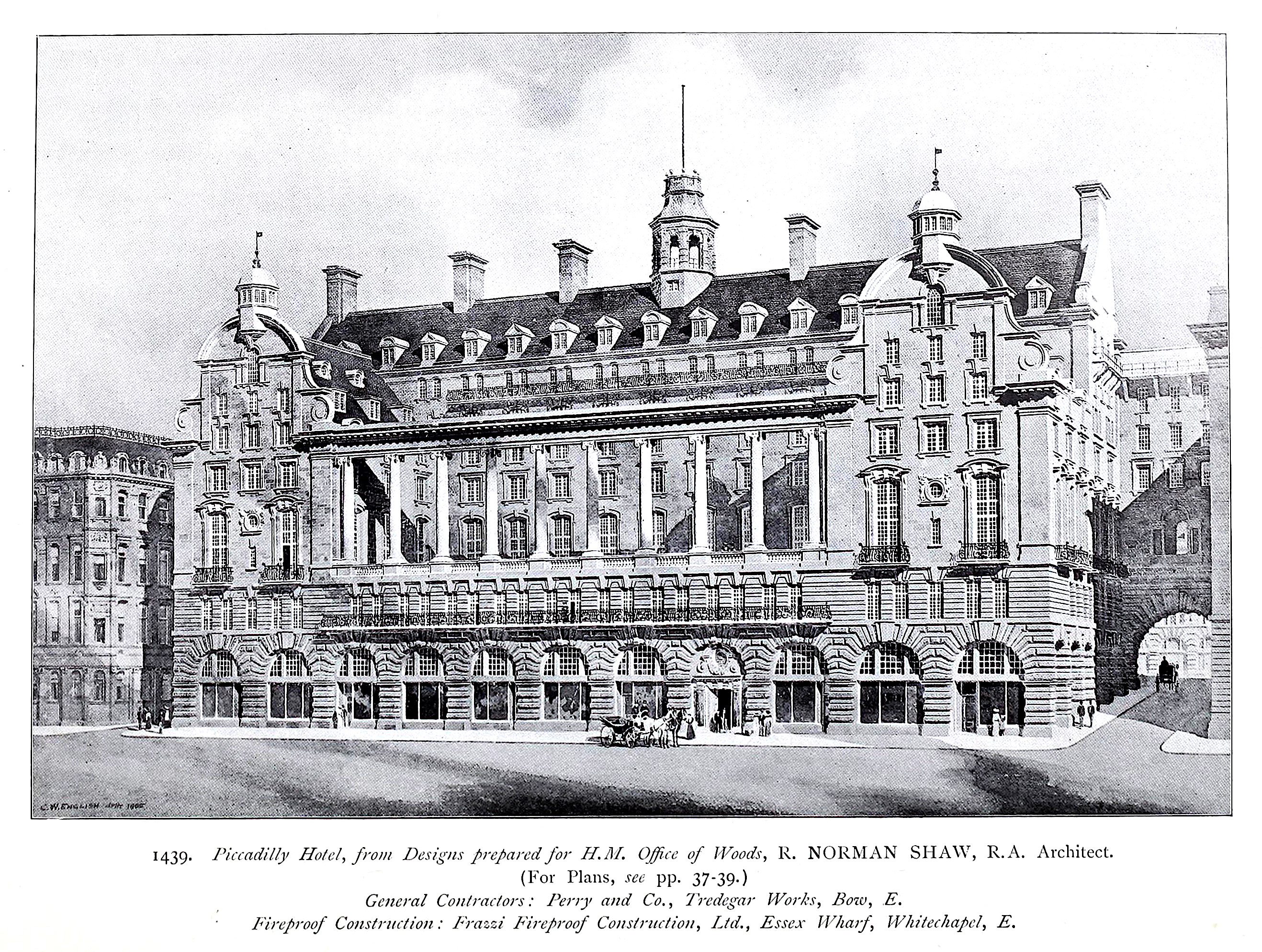
Artist's rendering of The Piccadilly Hotel from 1906

The hotel opened in 1908 as The Piccadilly Hotel. The building was designed by Richard Norman Shaw, and it was the first portion of the great scheme for the rebuilding of Piccadilly Circus and the Quadrant of Regent Street to be realised. Its original design however has never been entirely completed due to the presence of Denman House on the southeast corner which the hotel company was unable to acquire. It would have had a symmetrical eastern gable to match that on the west. The addition of two secondary gables pointing inwards that create a back-wall for the outermost sections of the screen was a change made to accommodate such a situation. The hotel was bought by Le Méridien in 1986 and renamed Le Méridien Piccadilly.

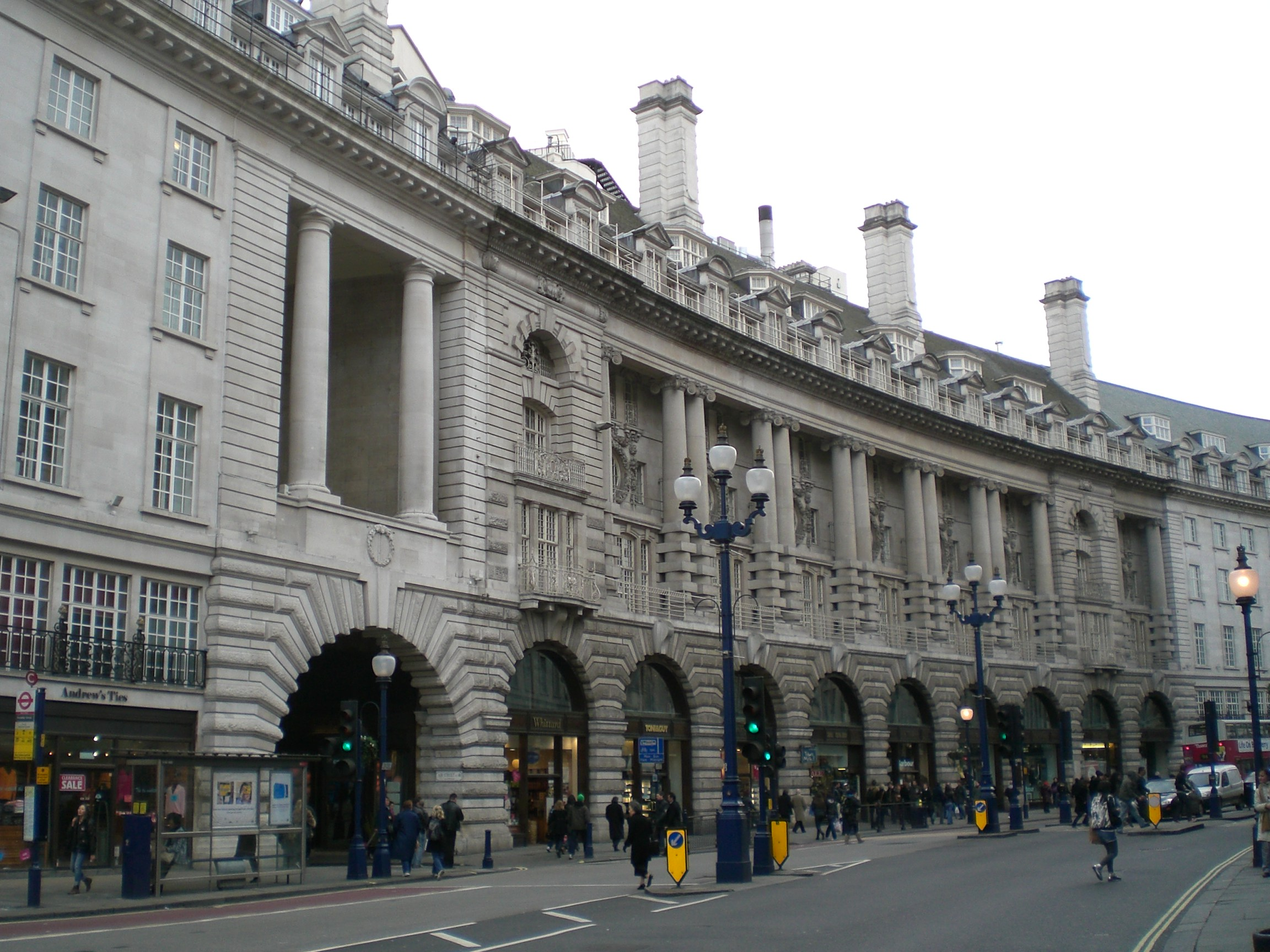
The hotel's rear façade, facing Regent Street

In 2010, Starman Hotels, a joint venture between Starwood Capital Group and Lehman Brothers, sold the hotel for £64 million to Host Hotels & Resorts, Dutch pension fund APG and Singaporean sovereign wealth fund GIC. In 2019, APG and GIC bought out Host's share, forming Archer Hotel Capital.

The hotel left the Le Méridien division of the Marriott chain on 26 November 2020, and was renamed The Dilly London. In 2022, Archer Hotel Capital sold the hotel to Israel-based Fattal Hotels, which announced plans for a £90 million renovation to convert the establishment into a luxury hotel.

Jack Hylton put 22 year old Ray Starita in charge of the band which played for the Revels cabaret and floorshow at the hotel from 1927 until 1928, a rival to the bands at the Savoy Hotel and Kit-Cat. The band reatured Ray Starita on tenor, Donald Thorne on piano and Eric Siday on violin. In the 1930s, the hotel had a resident orchestra which broadcast on the radio and was led by Sydney Kyte. They also appeared on commercial recordings, billed as Sydney Kyte and his Piccadilly Hotel Band.

In 1969, the hotel hosted the first international symposium on gender identity, named "Aims, Functions and Clinical Problems of a Gender Identity Unit".

== Facilities ==
The hotel has a health club with an indoor swimming pool, steam room and massage facilities. It is also home to a dance studio where world-competitors practice, and two squash courts. One of the hotel's two restaurants is Terrace at The Dilly, with views overlooking Piccadilly.

== Dining ==
The hotel's second restaurant is Madhu's of Mayfair, a fine dining Indian restaurant occupying the hotel's Grade II listed Oak Room and Lounge. Run by the Madhu's, which has been serving Indian cuisine and hospitality for over 45 years, the restaurant serves Punjabi cuisine with Kenyan influences. It was named Fine Dining Restaurant of the Year at the Nation's Curry Awards in 2023, and relaunched in 2026 under executive chef Sachin Bhusari head chef Amit Sharma.
