= Ted Lowe =

English snooker commentator (1920–2011)

Ted Lowe MBE
- Lowe in 1982
- Born: Edwin Charles Ernest Lowe; 1 November 1920; Lambourn, Berkshire, England
- Died: 1 May 2011 (aged 90); Bexhill-on-Sea, East Sussex, England
- Other name: "Whispering Ted" Lowe
- Occupation: Snooker commentator
- Known for: Pot Black
- Spouse: Jean Lowe
- Children: 2

Edwin Charles Ernest Lowe, MBE, (1 November 1920 – 1 May 2011) was an English snooker commentator for the BBC and ITV. His husky, hushed tones earned him the nickname "Whispering Ted".

== Life and career ==
Lowe was born on 1 November 1920 in Lambourn, Berkshire. Until its closure in 1955, he was general manager of London's Leicester Square Hall, then the home of professional billiards and snooker, after which he became a sales manager for the brewery firm Ind Coope. He got his break as a broadcaster in 1946 when the BBC's regular commentator, Raymond Glendenning, was suffering from laryngitis. Because there was no commentary box and he sat in the audience, Lowe spoke in a whisper, which became his trademark.

Lowe became the commentator for the snooker television show Pot Black in 1969 and went on to become the "voice of snooker" and led the commentary in many tournaments. He also commentated in what is generally regarded as snooker's greatest final, that between Steve Davis and Dennis Taylor in the 1985 World Snooker Championship.

Lowe occasionally uttered a gaffe on air; one of his most famous quotes being "and for those of you who are watching in black and white, the pink is next to the green." He once told viewers that Fred Davis, struggling to rest one leg on the edge of the table in order to reach a long shot, "is getting on a bit and is having trouble getting his leg over".

Lowe retired after the 1996 World Snooker Championship final, although he briefly joined in the commentary for the 2005 World Snooker Championship final, where Shaun Murphy defeated Matthew Stevens. He also came out of retirement to commentate on the 1997 Pot Black Seniors tournament.

Lowe died on 1 May 2011, aged 90, following a short illness, in Bexhill-on-Sea, on the morning of the first session of the 2011 World Snooker Championship final.

Recalling Lowe after his death, seven-time World Champion Stephen Hendry, who was once described by Lowe as the "wonder bairn of Scotland", said: "I remember playing Junior Pot Black, I was only 12 and he was a complete gentleman. Me and my father were down there and he was so nice to us."
