= 2008 Masters (snooker) =

Professional non-ranking snooker tournament, Jan 2008

2008 SAGA Insurance Masters

Tournament information
- Dates: 13–20 January 2008
- Venue: Wembley Arena
- City: London
- Country: England
- Organisation: WPBSA
- Format: Non-ranking event
- Total prize fund: £460,000
- Winner's share: £150,000
- Highest break: Mark Selby (ENG) (141); Ken Doherty (IRL) (141)

Final
- Champion: Mark Selby (ENG)
- Runner-up: Stephen Lee (ENG)
- Score: 10–3

The 2008 Masters (officially the 2008 SAGA Insurance Masters) was a professional non-ranking snooker tournament that took place from 13 to 20 January 2008 at the Wembley Arena in London, England. The second Triple Crown event of the 2007‍–‍08 season, following the 2007 UK Championship and preceding the 2008 World Snooker Championship, the tournament was the 34th edition of the Masters, which was first held in 1975. Organised by the World Professional Billiards and Snooker Association, the event was sponsored by Saga Insurance. The winner received £150,000 from a total prize fund of £460,000.

The defending champion, Ronnie O'Sullivan, lost to Stephen Maguire in the first round; it was the first time since 2003 that O'Sullivan did not make it to the final. Debutant Mark Selby won the tournament by defeating Stephen Lee 10–3 in the final. In the last frame, he tied Ken Doherty for the highest break of the tournament, recording a total clearance of 141. The tournament produced a total of 23 century breaks, with a further 27 made in the qualifying stages.

== Overview ==
The 2008 Masters was a professional non-ranking snooker tournament that took place from 13 to 20 January 2008 at the Wembley Arena in London, England. It was sponsored by Saga Insurance. The second Triple Crown event of the 2007‍–‍08 season, following the 2007 UK Championship and preceding the 2008 World Snooker Championship, the tournament was the 34th edition of the Masters, which was first held in 1975 for ten invited players at the West Centre Hotel in London. John Spencer won the inaugural event, defeating Ray Reardon on a re-spotted black in the deciding frame of the final. The second-oldest professional snooker tournament, after the World Snooker Championship, the Masters had been staged at the Wembley Arena since 2007. As of 2008, Stephen Hendry was the most successful player in the tournament's history, having won the title six times. Ronnie O'Sullivan held the record as the tournament's youngest winner, having won his first title in 1995, aged 19. Reardon stood as the oldest winner, as he was 43 when he prevailed in the 1976 final.

=== Participants ===
Defending champion Ronnie O'Sullivan was the number 1 seed with World Champion John Higgins seeded 2. Places were allocated to the top 16 players in the world rankings. Players seeded 15 and 16 played in the wild-card round against the winner of the qualifying event, Barry Hawkins (ranked 19), and wild-card selection Marco Fu (ranked 27). Mark Selby was making his debut in the Masters.

=== Prize money ===
The winner of the event received £150,000 from a total prize fund of £460,000. The breakdown of prize money for the event is shown below:

==== Qualifying stage ====
- Winner: £2,000
- Runner-up: £680
- Semi-final: £250
- Quarter-final: £105
- Total: £3,600

==== Televised stage ====
- Winner: £150,000
- Runner-up: £68,000
- Semi-final: £34,000
- Quarter-finalist: £16,000
- First round: £12,000
- Last 18 (wild-cards): £2,000
- Highest break: £10,000
- Maximum break: £25,000
- Total: £460,000

== Summary ==
=== Wild-card round ===
The wild-card-round matches were played as the best of 11 frames. In his match against Barry Hawkins, Ryan Day potted fifteen reds and was on course for a maximum break, but lost position and missed the fifteenth black. He went on to win 6‍–‍2. Marco Fu compiled a century break and four further half-centuries to defeat Steve Davis 6‍–‍2. "I was capitalising more on Steve [Davis]'s errors than creating good chances of my own," Fu said.

=== First round ===
The first-round matches were played as the best of 11 frames. Stephen Maguire faced Ronnie O'Sullivan, who was the defending champion and had defeated him 10‍–‍2 in the final of the 2007 UK Championship a month earlier. Maguire produced breaks of 103 and 84 as he moved into a 4‍–‍1 lead. O'Sullivan made breaks of 112 and 72 as he reduced the deficit and went on to force a decider. In the final frame, O'Sullivan missed the final blue when he was clearing the table and allowed Maguire to get back in and clinch victory with blue and pink. "I had my chance and I didn't take it. If you don't take your chances then don't expect another one," O'Sullivan lamented. It was the first time since 2003 that O'Sullivan did not reach the final of the event. The runner-up in the previous edition, Ding Junhui, was 1‍–‍3 and 3‍–‍4 in arrears to John Higgins, but took three frames on the spin to win 6‍–‍4. Stephen Lee won 6‍–‍5 over Graeme Dott. Shaun Murphy, who was feeling unwell, faced Ali Carter. Carter took the first frame on the final black and doubled his lead in the next, but Murphy levelled at 2‍–‍2 and 3‍–‍3. Murphy went on to win 6‍–‍3. "Ali [Carter] was poorly through the match as well. He said he wasn't feeling very well, so we both struggled," Murphy said afterwards.

Mark Williams took a 2‍–‍0 lead against Ken Doherty with breaks of 118 and 69. Doherty replied with breaks of 101, 89, 53 and 68 to win six consecutive breaks and advance into the quarter-finals. Out of the top 32 and facing the possibility of having to play in the qualifying stages of the following World Championship, Williams admitted after the defeat he has contemplating retiring from professional snooker. "I'll mull over my situation in the summer. There are plenty of things to do outside snooker, but hopefully I won't have to think about that," he said. Peter Ebdon compiled breaks of 92, 76, 52 and 50 as he built a 4‍–‍2 lead against Day. Day levelled the match with back-to-back 50 breaks, but Ebdon also won two on the spin to seal a 6‍–‍4 victory. Neil Robertson made breaks of 63 and 118 to take the two first frames of his match against Fu. Fu, winner of the 2007 Grand Prix, replied with breaks of 89, 71, 69 and 100 to go 4‍–‍2 in front. The match went to a decider, which Fu won on the colours. Stephen Hendry met Mark Selby in a match which, according to Sam Lyon's report for BBC Sport, was characterised "by missed pots and poor safety play". Hendry took a 5‍–‍3 lead with a break of 105, but Selby won three consecutive frames to win the match. "I feel I'm too good not to come back. People keep saying that Hendry's gone but that's all rubbish. One good performance and I'll be back," Hendry said afterwards.

=== Quarter-finals ===
The quarter-finals were played as the best of 11 frames. Doherty, who had recently been a father, fell 1‍–‍4 behind Murphy. Doherty manufactured breaks of 141 and 114 as he forced a decider, which he won with another century break. "There's never any disgrace in losing to someone who's playing as well as Ken [Doherty] was," Murphy said. Maguire, winner of the 2007 Northern Ireland Trophy, produced a 105 break as he raced into a 3‍–‍1 lead against Selby. A miss on the yellow in frame eight allowed Maguire to maintain a two-frame cushion at 5‍–‍3, one shy of victory. Selby made breaks of 55, 103 and 54 to win three consecutive frames and take the match. "I just can't believe I've got beat. I was thinking I was in the next round, but he stepped up a gear and played great," Maguire said.

Lee won the two first frames of his match against Ebdon. In the third, Ebdon went for a more difficult black ball so as to stay on course to a maximum break, but missed it and allowed Lee to steal it with an 87 clearance. "I shouldn't have gone for the maximum and I got what I deserved," Ebdon said after the match. Lee then extended his lead to five frames, only one away from a place in the final. In the sixth frame, Ebdon was on a break of 105 in another attempt to get a 147, but missed a black off its spot. Lee clinched victory in the following frame. "It was a strange game, he never settled and kept giving me some nice chances," Lee said after the match. Ding made an 87 break and Fu compiled a 93 as they shared the first four frames. Ding won the next, but Fu produced breaks of 62, 86 and 51 to win four consecutive frames for a 6‍–‍3 victory.

=== Semi-finals ===
The semi-finals were played as the best of 11 frames. Selby won the opening frame, but Doherty then edged 2‍–‍1 in front. Although Selby replied with three consecutive frames to lead 3‍–‍2, the match went into a decider. Selby won it. Doherty regretted that, having had a chance in the decider, he did not win it. "I have had a good tournament but at this moment in time I'm not thinking about that," he said after the match.

In the other semi-final, Lee enjoyed a 3‍–‍1 lead against Fu, who narrowed the deficit in the following frame. Lee went on to secure a place in the final with a 6‍–‍2 victory. "I felt quite nervous at the start of the match but then got stuck in. I just kept Marco away from the table today and that proved decisive," Lee said. Fu argued that he was tired, not having been able to sleep after his quarter-final match against Ding.

=== Final ===
The final took place on 20 January as the best of 19 frames, between Selby and Lee. Referee Michaela Tabb, who had been in charge of the final of the 2007 Welsh Open during the season, became the first woman to officiate a Masters final. "I'll be making a little bit of history," she said ahead of the match. Selby reached the final having won all his matches in the deciding frame. While Selby was playing in the final as a Masters debutant, Lee reached the final on his eleventh appearance. Lee won the opening frame with a 41 break, which would remain as his highest of the match. Lee was also ahead at 3‍–‍1, but Selby won four on the spin before the interval aided by breaks of 124 and 88. In the first of the evening session, Selby compiled a break of 132. Selby clinched a 10‍–‍3 victory with another century break in the last frame, a 141 break which tied the one made by Doherty as the highest of the tournament and secured him an additional prize of £5,000.

Selby became the fourth debutant—after John Spencer in 1975, Doug Mountjoy in 1977, Terry Griffiths in 1980 and Hendry in 1989—to win the Masters as a debutant. "I've been knocking on the door for a while. The world championship would have been nice last season, but to win the Masters is amazing," Selby said, and he added: "I'm only 24 but I feel about 40 after those close matches". Lee was disappointed with his performance in the final. "I'm gutted for people who turned up to watch me," he said.

== Wild-card round ==
In the wild-card round, the qualifier and wild-card players played the 15th and 16th seeds:

Match	Date		Score	
WC1	Monday 14 January	Steve Davis (ENG) (15)	2–6	Marco Fu (HKG)
WC2	Sunday 13 January	Ryan Day (WAL) (16)	6–2	Barry Hawkins (ENG)

== Main draw ==
The results for the main draw are shown below. Match winners are shown in bold. The numbers in parentheses after the players' names denote the seedings.

**First round** Best of 11 frames
Ronnie O'Sullivan (ENG) (1)	5
**Stephen Maguire (SCO) (10)**	**6**
Stephen Hendry (SCO) (8)	5
**Mark Selby (ENG) (11)**	**6**
**Ken Doherty (IRL) (5)**	**6**
Mark Williams (WAL) (12)	2
**Shaun Murphy (ENG) (4)**	**6**
Ali Carter (ENG) (14)	3
Graeme Dott (SCO) (3)	5
**Stephen Lee (ENG) (13)**	**6**
**Peter Ebdon (ENG) (6)**	**6**
Ryan Day (WAL) (16)	4
Neil Robertson (AUS) (7)	5
**Marco Fu (HKG)**	**6**
John Higgins (SCO) (2)	4
**Ding Junhui (CHN) (9)**	**6**

**Quarter-finals**; Best of 11 frames
Stephen Maguire (SCO) (10)	5
**Mark Selby (ENG) (11)**	**6**
**Ken Doherty (IRL) (5)**	**6**
Shaun Murphy (ENG) (4)	5
**Stephen Lee (ENG) (13)**	**6**
Peter Ebdon (ENG) (6)	1
**Marco Fu (HKG)**	**6**
Ding Junhui (CHN) (9)	3

**Semi-finals**; Best of 11 frames
**Mark Selby (ENG) (11)**	**6**
Ken Doherty (IRL) (5)	5
**Stephen Lee (ENG) (13)**	**6**
Marco Fu (HKG)	2

**Final**; Best of 19 frames
**Mark Selby (ENG) (11)**	**10**
Stephen Lee (ENG) (13)	3

== Final ==
Final: Best of 19 frames. Referee: Michaela Tabb. Wembley Arena, London, England, 20 January 2008.
Mark Selby (11); England	10–3	Stephen Lee (13); England
Afternoon: 50–65, 124–1 (124), 88–0 (88), 21–77, 13–61, 76–16, 79–1 (60), 73–9; Evening: 132–0 (132), 76–32, 72–52, 125–5 (125), 141–0 (141)
141	Highest break	41
4	Century breaks	0
6	50+ breaks	0

== Qualifying ==
The 2007 Masters Qualifying Event was held between 7 September and 12 September 2007 at the English Institute of Sport in Sheffield. The winner of this series of matches, who qualified for the tournament, was Barry Hawkins.

Last 64; Best of 7 frames
(Northern Ireland) Joe Swail
Bye
(Scotland) Jamie Burnett	4
(China) Xiao Guodong	2
(Wales) Matthew Stevens	0
(England) Jimmy White	4
(England) Andy Hicks	4
(Republic of Ireland) Leo Fernandez	2
(England) Michael Holt	2
(England) Ben Woollaston	4
(Republic of Ireland) Fergal O'Brien	4
(England) Ian Preece	0
(England) Anthony Hamilton	4
(England) Alex Davies	0
(England) Mark Davis	4
(England) Jamie O'Neill	0
(Northern Ireland) Mark Allen	4
(England) Ashley Wright	3
(England) Rod Lawler	4
(England) Jimmy Robertson	0
(Wales) Dominic Dale	1
(China) Liang Wenbo	4
(Republic of Ireland) Joe Delaney	4
(England) Munraj Pal	2
(Northern Ireland) Gerard Greene	2
(Norway) Kurt Maflin	4
(England) Judd Trump	4
(England) Matthew Selt	2
(England) Dave Harold	1
(Wales) Paul Davies	4
(England) Andrew Higginson	4
(England) Joe Jogia	1
(England) Stuart Bingham	2
(England) Alfie Burden	4
(England) Ricky Walden	4
(England) Lee Spick	1
(England) Jamie Cope	4
(England) Mark Joyce	2
(England) Rory McLeod	4
(England) Lee Walker	1
(England) Mark King	4
(Thailand) Issara Kachaiwong	3
(England) David Gray	w/o
(Malta) Tony Drago	w/d
(Republic of Ireland) Michael Judge	4
(Scotland) James McBain	0
(England) Andrew Norman	4
(Australia) Steve Mifsud	2
(England) Nigel Bond	4
(Wales) Gareth Coppack	1
(Finland) Robin Hull	2
(China) Tian Pengfei	4
(England) Barry Hawkins	4
(Scotland) Fraser Patrick	3
(England) Tom Ford	0
(Wales) Michael White	4
(England) Ian McCulloch	3
(England) Martin Gould	4
(England) Barry Pinches	3
(China) Liu Chuang	4
(England) David Gilbert	4
(Thailand) Supoj Saenla	2
(England) Joe Perry
Bye

Last 32; Best of 9 frames
(Northern Ireland) Joe Swail	2
(Scotland) Jamie Burnett	5
(England) Jimmy White	5
(England) Andy Hicks	1
(England) Ben Woollaston	5
(Republic of Ireland) Fergal O'Brien	4
(England) Anthony Hamilton	5
(England) Mark Davis	1
(Northern Ireland) Mark Allen	5
(England) Rod Lawler	2
(China) Liang Wenbo	5
(Republic of Ireland) Joe Delaney	2
(Norway) Kurt Maflin	5
(England) Judd Trump	4
(Wales) Paul Davies	1
(England) Andrew Higginson	5
(England) Alfie Burden	0
(England) Ricky Walden	5
(England) Jamie Cope	5
(England) Rory McLeod	2
(England) Mark King	5
(England) David Gray	4
(Republic of Ireland) Michael Judge	5
(England) Andrew Norman	4
(England) Nigel Bond	5
(China) Tian Pengfei	4
(England) Barry Hawkins	5
(Wales) Michael White	2
(England) Martin Gould	4
(China) Liu Chuang	5
(England) David Gilbert	5
(England) Joe Perry	3

Last 16; Best of 9 frames
(Scotland) Jamie Burnett	4
(England) Jimmy White	5
(England) Ben Woollaston	5
(England) Anthony Hamilton	4
(Northern Ireland) Mark Allen	4
(China) Liang Wenbo	5
(Norway) Kurt Maflin	5
(England) Andrew Higginson	4
(England) Ricky Walden	3
(England) Jamie Cope	5
(England) Mark King	0
(Republic of Ireland) Michael Judge	5
(England) Nigel Bond	2
(England) Barry Hawkins	5
(China) Liu Chuang	5
(England) David Gilbert	0

Quarter-finals; Best of 9 frames
(England) Jimmy White	5
(England) Ben Woollaston	0
(China) Liang Wenbo	0
(Norway) Kurt Maflin	5
(England) Jamie Cope	5
(Republic of Ireland) Michael Judge	1
(England) Barry Hawkins	5
(China) Liu Chuang	3

Semi-finals; Best of 9 frames
(England) Jimmy White	4
(Norway) Kurt Maflin	5
(England) Jamie Cope	3
(England) Barry Hawkins	5

Final; Best of 11 frames
(Norway) Kurt Maflin	4
(England) Barry Hawkins	6

== Century breaks ==
=== Main stage centuries ===
A total of 23 century breaks were made during the main stage of the tournament.

- 141, 132, 125, 124, 107, 103 – Mark Selby
- 141, 123, 114, 101 – Ken Doherty
- 135 – Ding Junhui
- 120, 113 – Ryan Day
- 118 – Neil Robertson
- 118 – Mark Williams
- 112 – Ronnie O'Sullivan
- 107 – Graeme Dott
- 105, 103 – Stephen Maguire
- 105 – Peter Ebdon
- 105 – Stephen Hendry
- 104, 100 – Marco Fu

=== Qualifying stage centuries ===
A total of 27 century breaks were made during the qualifying rounds.

- 140 – Jamie Burnett
- 137, 104 – Liu Chuang
- 136 – Anthony Hamilton
- 135, 123, 109, 107, 103 – Jamie Cope
- 125 – Joe Perry
- 122, 110 – Kurt Maflin
- 119, 113 – Judd Trump
- 114, 105 – Andrew Higginson
- 114 – Jimmy White
- 110, 102 – Mark Allen
- 110 – Xiao Guodong
- 107, 104 – Ricky Walden
- 107 – Joe Delaney
- 103 – David Gilbert
- 101 – Andrew Norman
- 100 – Alfie Burden
- 100 – Nigel Bond
