= Triple Crown (snooker) =

Series of professional snooker tournaments

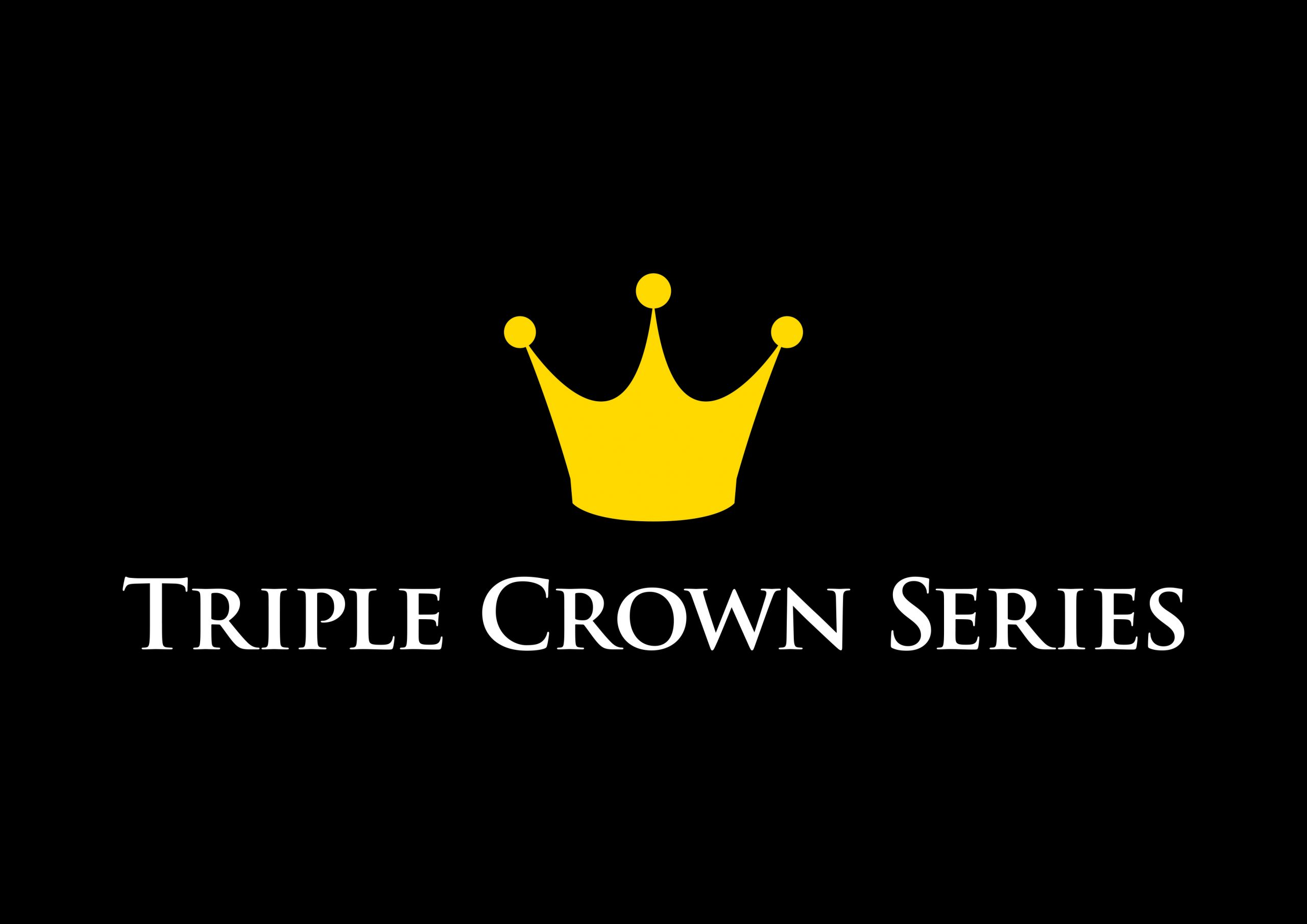
The current Triple Crown logo since January 2024 (left) and previous logo (right).

The Triple Crown in professional snooker refers to winning the sport's three longest-running and most prestigious tournaments: the World Snooker Championship (first held in 1927 and staged as a knockout tournament continuously since 1969), the invitational Masters (held annually since 1975) and the UK Championship (held annually since 1977). Any player who has won all three Triple Crown tournaments at least once over the course of their career is said to have won a "career Triple Crown" and they gain the right to wear an embroidered crown on their waistcoat to reflect the achievement.

As of 2026, eleven players have won a career Triple Crown: Steve Davis, Terry Griffiths, Alex Higgins, Stephen Hendry, John Higgins, Mark Williams, Ronnie O'Sullivan, Neil Robertson, Mark Selby, Shaun Murphy and Judd Trump. O'Sullivan has won the most Triple Crown titles with 23, Hendry 18 and Davis 15; Davis, Hendry and Williams are the only three players to have won all three Triple Crown events in a single season (Davis in 1987–88, Hendry in both 1989–90 and 1995–96 and Williams in 2002–03).

== History ==
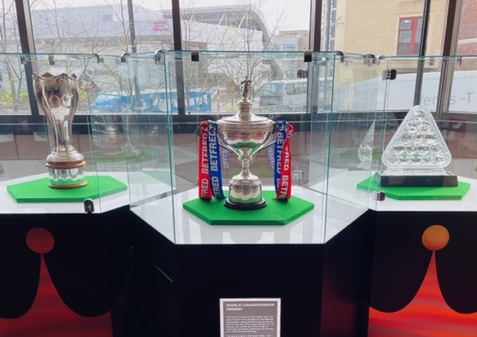
Trophies of the Triple Crown tournaments, from left to right: UK Championship, World Snooker Championship and Masters.

In 1969, the World Snooker Championship became a single elimination tournament, replacing the previous challenge format. This change marks the start of professional snooker's "modern era". Six years later, a non-ranking invitational event, the Masters, was introduced. There were 10 competitors in the inaugural Masters in 1975, later increasing to 16 players. John Spencer, who had won the world championships in 1969 and 1971, won the 1975 Masters tournament. The following year, Ray Reardon won both the Masters and World Championship in the same season.

In 1977, the UK Championship was created. Originally restricted to British residents and passport holders, the tournament was opened to all professionals in 1984 and also became a ranking event. Patsy Fagan won the 1977 UK Championship, in his only Triple Crown final. In the 1980–81 season, Steve Davis won both the UK Championship and the World Championship, and was the first player to complete the career Triple Crown when he won the Masters the following season. Davis was also the first player to complete the season Triple Crown, winning all three events in the 1987–88 season.

=== Branding and prizes ===
From the 2020 Masters onward, players who have completed the Triple Crown are eligible to have a gold crown embroidered on their playing waistcoats in recognition of the achievement, and the three tournaments were formally named the Triple Crown Series.

In 2023, World Snooker Tour introduced a £147,000 bonus for any player making two maximum breaks during the season's Triple Crown Series. The bonus could be awarded up to three times, for a total of £441,000, if three players each made two maximums. The same player could potentially win £441,000 by making six maximums in the events. This bonus was discontinued as of the 2026-27 snooker season.

In January 2024, World Snooker Tour introduced a new Triple Crown logo, as part of the new branding of the organisation.

=== Major event status and debate ===
The Triple Crown events are sometimes referred to as the "big three BBC events", due to them having been broadcast by the British Broadcasting Corporation since inception. They are also sometimes called "snooker's majors", or the "big three" events. However, some have questioned the status of the Triple Crown events, arguing that the World Championship is snooker's only major tournament. John Higgins has described the Tour Championship, first held in 2019, as "far bigger than the UK [Championship]".

Triple Crown events are considered the most prestigious snooker titles, and have historically offered the most prize money. However, the total prize money for other events, such as the China Open, has exceeded that of the UK Championship and Masters in recent years. The defunct Saudi Arabia Snooker Masters had also matched the World Championship's winner's share, and was officially marketed as the "snooker's fourth major". When the International Championship was first held, it was also marketed in the same way and deemed as an overseas replica of the World Championship.

== Career Triple Crown winners ==
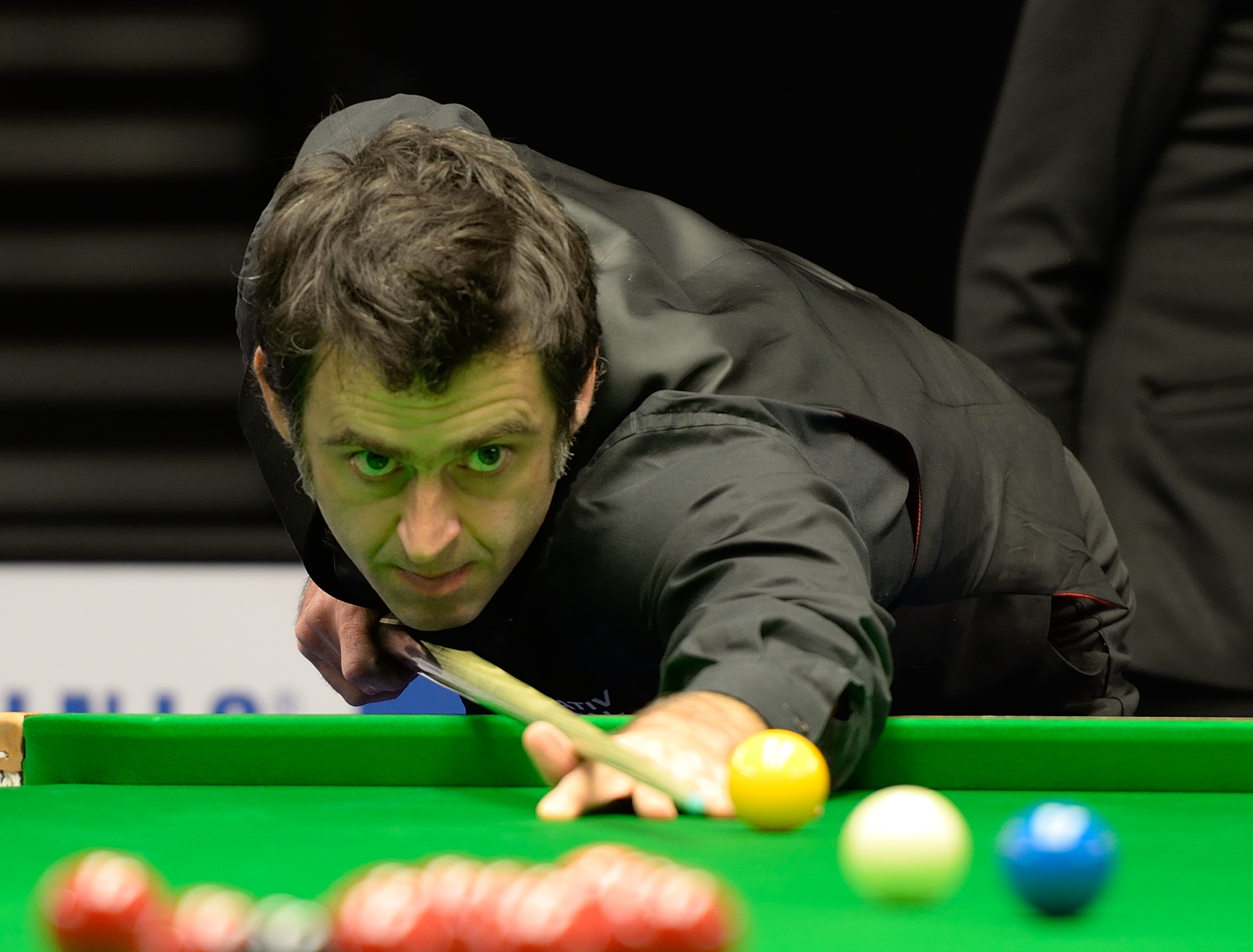
Ronnie O'Sullivan has won 23 Triple Crown titles – the most won by any player.

Eleven players have completed a career Triple Crown: Steve Davis, Terry Griffiths, Alex Higgins, Stephen Hendry, John Higgins, Mark Williams, Ronnie O'Sullivan, Neil Robertson, Mark Selby, Shaun Murphy and Judd Trump. Only Davis, Hendry and Williams have won all three Triple Crown events in the same season. As of 2025, Hendry is the only player to have achieved the feat twice, in the 1989–90 and 1995–96 seasons.

On winning the 1999 Masters, John Higgins held all three Triple Crown titles at the same time but his victories spanned two separate seasons. O'Sullivan came close to holding all three titles at once, making the final of all three events in 2014. He won the Masters and UK titles that year but not the World title, despite being the defending champion for the second successive year. Only O'Sullivan and Hendry have managed to successfully defend all three Triple Crown events. In 2013, Robertson became the first player from outside the United Kingdom to complete the career Triple Crown.

Following his win in the 2018 UK Championship, O'Sullivan surpassed Hendry's previous record of 18 Triple Crown titles, and has now won 23. As of 2025, Trump is the latest player to have achieved a career Triple Crown, winning both the Masters and World Championship in the 2018–19 season after having already won the UK Championship in 2011.

Player	Total	WSC	UK	Masters	Winning span	Career Triple Crown first achieved	Single season Triple Crown
Ronnie O'Sullivan (ENG) †	23	7	8	8	1993–2024	2001 World Championship	
Stephen Hendry (SCO)	18	7	5	6	1989–1999	1990 World Championship	2 (1989–90, 1995–96)
Steve Davis (ENG)	15	6	6	3	1980–1997	1982 Masters	1 (1987–88)
Mark Selby (ENG) †	10	4	3	3	2008–2025	2014 World Championship	
John Higgins (SCO) †	9	4	3	2	1998–2011	1999 Masters	
Mark Williams (WAL) †	7	3	2	2	1998–2018	2000 World Championship	1 (2002–03)
Neil Robertson (AUS) †	6	1	3	2	2010–2022	2013 UK Championship	
Alex Higgins (NIR)	5	2	1	2	1972–1983	1983 UK Championship	
Judd Trump (ENG) †	5	1	2	2	2011–2024	2019 World Championship	
Shaun Murphy (ENG) †	4	1	1	2	2005–2025	2015 Masters	
Terry Griffiths (WAL)	3	1	1	1	1979–1982	1982 UK Championship	

Legend
†	Active player.

Sources: World Championship; UK Championship; Masters.

=== One win away from Triple Crown ===
Of those still active on the main professional tour (as of 2026), seven players have won two of the three Triple Crown events, leaving them one away from completing a career Triple Crown. Jimmy White, Matthew Stevens, Ding Junhui and Mark Allen have all won the Masters and UK Championship at least once, but all four players need to win the World Championship to complete their Triple Crown. Of these, three have reached the final of the event, those being White (6 times), Stevens (2 times) and Ding (1 time), while Allen has reached the semi-final 3 times. Stuart Bingham and Kyren Wilson have a World title and a Masters title, but are yet to win the UK Championship for their career Triple Crown. Zhao Xintong has won the World and UK Championships, but has not won the Masters.

Seven former professional players—Peter Ebdon, John Parrott, Ray Reardon, John Spencer, Dennis Taylor, Doug Mountjoy and Cliff Thorburn—won two of the three Triple Crown events before their retirement. Ebdon and Parrott both won UK and World titles, and Parrott reached the final of the Masters on three occasions between 1989 and 1992 but never won the title. Reardon, Spencer, Taylor and Thorburn won the World Championship and Masters tournaments during their careers, but not the UK Championship. Mountjoy came close to winning the World Championship in 1981, only to lose to Steve Davis in the final.

== Tournament winners ==
A list of all winners of the three Triple Crown events is shown below by season:

Season	UK Championship	Masters	World Championship	Ref.
1968–69	Started in 1977–1978	Started in 1974–1975	John Spencer (ENG) (1/4)	
1969–70	Started in 1977–1978	Started in 1974–1975	Ray Reardon (WAL) (1/7)	
1970–71	Started in 1977–1978	Started in 1974–1975	John Spencer (ENG) (2/4)	
1971–72	Started in 1977–1978	Started in 1974–1975	Alex Higgins (NIR) (1/5)	
1972–73	Started in 1977–1978	Started in 1974–1975	Ray Reardon (WAL) (2/7)	
1973–74	Started in 1977–1978	Started in 1974–1975	Ray Reardon (WAL) (3/7)	
1974–75	Started in 1977–1978	John Spencer (ENG) (3/4)	Ray Reardon (WAL) (4/7)	
1975–76	Started in 1977–1978	Ray Reardon (WAL)† (5/7)	Ray Reardon (WAL)† (6/7)	
1976–77	Started in 1977–1978	Doug Mountjoy (WAL) (1/3)	John Spencer (ENG) (4/4)	
1977–78	Patsy Fagan (IRL) (1/1)	Alex Higgins (NIR) (2/5)	Ray Reardon (WAL) (7/7)	
1978–79	Doug Mountjoy (WAL) (2/3)	Perrie Mans (RSA) (1/1)	Terry Griffiths (WAL) (1/3)	
1979–80	John Virgo (ENG) (1/1)	Terry Griffiths (WAL) (2/3)	Cliff Thorburn (CAN) (1/4)	
1980–81	Steve Davis (ENG)† (1/15)	Alex Higgins (NIR) (3/5)	Steve Davis (ENG)† (2/15)	
1981–82	Steve Davis (ENG)† (3/15)	Steve Davis (ENG)† (4/15)	Alex Higgins (NIR) (4/5)	
1982–83	Terry Griffiths (WAL) (3/3)	Cliff Thorburn (CAN) (2/4)	Steve Davis (ENG) (5/15)	
1983–84	Alex Higgins (NIR) (5/5)	Jimmy White (ENG) (1/2)	Steve Davis (ENG) (6/15)	
1984–85	Steve Davis (ENG) (7/15)	Cliff Thorburn (CAN) (3/4)	Dennis Taylor (NIR) (1/2)	
1985–86	Steve Davis (ENG) (8/15)	Cliff Thorburn (CAN) (4/4)	Joe Johnson (ENG) (1/1)	
1986–87	Steve Davis (ENG)† (9/15)	Dennis Taylor (NIR) (2/2)	Steve Davis (ENG)† (10/15)	
1987–88	Steve Davis (ENG)‡ (11/15)	Steve Davis (ENG)‡ (12/15)	Steve Davis (ENG)‡ (13/15)	
1988–89	Doug Mountjoy (WAL) (3/3)	Stephen Hendry (SCO) (1/18)	Steve Davis (ENG) (14/15)	
1989–90	Stephen Hendry (SCO)‡ (2/18)	Stephen Hendry (SCO)‡ (3/18)	Stephen Hendry (SCO)‡ (4/18)	
1990–91	Stephen Hendry (SCO)† (5/18)	Stephen Hendry (SCO)† (6/18)	John Parrott (ENG) (1/2)	
1991–92	John Parrott (ENG) (2/2)	Stephen Hendry (SCO)† (7/18)	Stephen Hendry (SCO)† (8/18)	
1992–93	Jimmy White (ENG) (2/2)	Stephen Hendry (SCO)† (9/18)	Stephen Hendry (SCO)† (10/18)	
1993–94	Ronnie O'Sullivan (ENG) (1/23)	Alan McManus (SCO) (1/1)	Stephen Hendry (SCO) (11/18)	
1994–95	Stephen Hendry (SCO)† (12/18)	Ronnie O'Sullivan (ENG) (2/23)	Stephen Hendry (SCO)† (13/18)	
1995–96	Stephen Hendry (SCO)‡ (14/18)	Stephen Hendry (SCO)‡ (15/18)	Stephen Hendry (SCO)‡ (16/18)	
1996–97	Stephen Hendry (SCO) (17/18)	Steve Davis (ENG) (15/15)	Ken Doherty (IRL) (1/1)	
1997–98	Ronnie O'Sullivan (ENG) (3/23)	Mark Williams (WAL) (1/7)	John Higgins (SCO) (1/9)	
1998–99	John Higgins (SCO)† (2/9)	John Higgins (SCO)† (3/9)	Stephen Hendry (SCO) (18/18)	
1999–00	Mark Williams (WAL)† (2/7)	Matthew Stevens (WAL) (1/2)	Mark Williams (WAL)† (3/7)	
2000–01	John Higgins (SCO) (4/9)	Paul Hunter (ENG) (1/3)	Ronnie O'Sullivan (ENG) (4/23)	
2001–02	Ronnie O'Sullivan (ENG) (5/23)	Paul Hunter (ENG) (2/3)	Peter Ebdon (ENG) (1/2)	
2002–03	Mark Williams (WAL)‡ (4/7)	Mark Williams (WAL)‡ (5/7)	Mark Williams (WAL)‡ (6/7)	
2003–04	Matthew Stevens (WAL) (2/2)	Paul Hunter (ENG) (3/3)	Ronnie O'Sullivan (ENG) (6/23)	
2004–05	Stephen Maguire (SCO) (1/1)	Ronnie O'Sullivan (ENG) (7/23)	Shaun Murphy (ENG) (1/4)	
2005–06	Ding Junhui (CHN) (1/4)	John Higgins (SCO) (5/9)	Graeme Dott (SCO) (1/1)	
2006–07	Peter Ebdon (ENG) (2/2)	Ronnie O'Sullivan (ENG) (8/23)	John Higgins (SCO) (6/9)	
2007–08	Ronnie O'Sullivan (ENG)† (9/23)	Mark Selby (ENG) (1/10)	Ronnie O'Sullivan (ENG)† (10/23)	
2008–09	Shaun Murphy (ENG) (2/4)	Ronnie O'Sullivan (ENG) (11/23)	John Higgins (SCO) (7/9)	
2009–10	Ding Junhui (CHN) (2/4)	Mark Selby (ENG) (2/10)	Neil Robertson (AUS) (1/6)	
2010–11	John Higgins (SCO)† (8/9)	Ding Junhui (CHN) (3/4)	John Higgins (SCO)† (9/9)	
2011–12	Judd Trump (ENG) (1/5)	Neil Robertson (AUS) (2/6)	Ronnie O'Sullivan (ENG) (12/23)	
2012–13	Mark Selby (ENG)† (3/10)	Mark Selby (ENG)† (4/10)	Ronnie O'Sullivan (ENG) (13/23)	
2013–14	Neil Robertson (AUS) (3/6)	Ronnie O'Sullivan (ENG) (14/23)	Mark Selby (ENG) (5/10)	
2014–15	Ronnie O'Sullivan (ENG) (15/23)	Shaun Murphy (ENG) (3/4)	Stuart Bingham (ENG) (1/2)	
2015–16	Neil Robertson (AUS) (4/6)	Ronnie O'Sullivan (ENG) (16/23)	Mark Selby (ENG) (6/10)	
2016–17	Mark Selby (ENG)† (7/10)	Ronnie O'Sullivan (ENG) (17/23)	Mark Selby (ENG)† (8/10)	
2017–18	Ronnie O'Sullivan (ENG) (18/23)	Mark Allen (NIR) (1/2)	Mark Williams (WAL) (7/7)	
2018–19	Ronnie O'Sullivan (ENG) (19/23)	Judd Trump (ENG)† (2/5)	Judd Trump (ENG)† (3/5)	
2019–20	Ding Junhui (CHN) (4/4)	Stuart Bingham (ENG) (2/2)	Ronnie O'Sullivan (ENG) (20/23)	
2020–21	Neil Robertson (AUS) (5/6)	Yan Bingtao (CHN) (1/1)	Mark Selby (ENG) (9/10)	
2021–22	Zhao Xintong (CHN) (1/2)	Neil Robertson (AUS) (6/6)	Ronnie O'Sullivan (ENG) (21/23)	
2022–23	Mark Allen (NIR) (2/2)	Judd Trump (ENG) (4/5)	Luca Brecel (BEL) (1/1)	
2023–24	Ronnie O'Sullivan (ENG)† (22/23)	Ronnie O'Sullivan (ENG)† (23/23)	Kyren Wilson (ENG) (1/2)	
2024–25	Judd Trump (ENG) (5/5)	Shaun Murphy (ENG) (4/4)	Zhao Xintong (CHN) (2/2)	
2025–26	Mark Selby (ENG) (10/10)	Kyren Wilson (ENG) (2/2)	Wu Yize (CHN) (1/1)	

Legend
‡	Player won all three Triple Crown tournaments in the same season.
†	Player won two of the three Triple Crown tournaments in the same season.

Sources: UK Championship; Masters; World Championship.

== See also ==
- List of snooker Triple Crown finals
- List of snooker players by number of ranking titles
