= 1974 Pot Black =

Tournament information
- Dates: 29 December 1973 – 1 January 1974 (broadcast 5 February – 21 May 1974)
- Venue: Pebble Mill Studios
- City: Birmingham
- Country: England
- Format: Non-ranking event
- Winner's share: £1,000
- Highest break: (England) Graham Miles (68)

Final
- Champion: (England) Graham Miles
- Runner-up: (England) John Spencer
- Score: Aggregate score (147–86)

The 1974 Pot Black was a professional invitational snooker tournament, which took place between 29 December 1973 and 1 January 1974 in the Pebble Mill Studios in Birmingham, and featured eight professional players. All matches were one-frame shoot-outs.

Broadcasts were on BBC2 and started at 21:00 on Tuesday 5 February 1974 Alan Weeks presented the programme with Ted Lowe as commentator and Sydney Lee as referee.

The tournament was contested by 8 players in two round-robin groups of 4 with the top two players from each group qualifying for the semi-finals. This year's tournament featured the debuts of Cliff Thorburn and Graham Miles who went on to win the Pot Black title at the first attempt beating John Spencer in the final. For the first time the final was decided on aggregate score over two frames, shown on 14 and 21 May, Miles won both frames, 77–37 and 70–49, winning by a score of 147–86.

== Main draw ==
=== League 1 ===
Player 1	Score	Player 2	Broadcast Date
(Australia) Eddie Charlton	1–0	(Wales) Ray Reardon	5 February 1974
(England) John Spencer	0–1	(England) Rex Williams	19 February 1974
(Wales) Ray Reardon	0–1	(England) John Spencer	5 March 1974
(Australia) Eddie Charlton	1–0	(England) Rex Williams	19 March 1974
(Wales) Ray Reardon	1–0	(England) Rex Williams	2 April 1974
(Australia) Eddie Charlton	0–1	(England) John Spencer	16 April 1974

=== League 2 ===
Player 1	Score	Player 2	Broadcast Date
(Canada) Cliff Thorburn	0–1	(England) John Pulman	12 February 1974
(Northern Ireland) Jackie Rea	1–0	(England) Graham Miles	26 February 1974
(Canada) Cliff Thorburn	0–1	(England) Graham Miles	12 March 1974
(England) John Pulman	1–0	(Northern Ireland) Jackie Rea	26 March 1974
(Canada) Cliff Thorburn	1–0	(Northern Ireland) Jackie Rea	9 April 1974
(England) John Pulman	0–1	(England) Graham Miles	23 April 1974

=== Knockout stage ===
Semi-finals (30 April and 7 May 1974)		Final (14 and 21 May 1974)
(Australia) Eddie Charlton	0
(England) Graham Miles	1	(England) Graham Miles	147
(England) John Pulman	0	(England) John Spencer	86
(England) John Spencer	1
