= 1977 Masters =

1977 Masters may refer to:

- 1977 Colgate-Palmolive Masters (tennis)
- 1977 Masters (snooker)
- 1977 Masters Tournament (golf)
