= 1982 International Masters =

1982 Yamaha International Masters
Tournament information
- Dates: 1–7 March 1982
- Venue: Assembly Rooms
- City: Derby
- Country: England
- Organisation: WPBSA
- Format: Non-ranking event
- Total prize fund: £38,000
- Winner's share: £10,000
- Highest break: (England) Steve Davis (135)

Final
- Champion: (England) Steve Davis
- Runner-up: (Wales) Terry Griffiths
- Score: 9–7

The 1982 International Masters (officially the 1982 Yamaha International Masters) was a non-ranking snooker tournament, that was held between 1 and 7 March 1982 at the Assembly Rooms in Derby, England.

The final attracted an average of 11.9 million viewers on ITV, peaking at 13.3 million.

== Main draw ==
=== Group 1 ===
Player 1	Score	Player 2	Date
(Canada) Kirk Stevens	2–1	(England) Ray Edmonds	
(Canada) Kirk Stevens	2–1	(Canada) Bill Werbeniuk	
(England) Steve Davis	1–2	(England) Ray Edmonds	
(Canada) Bill Werbeniuk	0–2	(England) Ray Edmonds	
(England) Steve Davis	2–0	(Canada) Kirk Stevens	
(England) Steve Davis	2–0	(Canada) Bill Werbeniuk	

=== Group 2 ===
Player 1	Score	Player 2	Date
(Northern Ireland) Dennis Taylor	1–2	(England) John Virgo	
(Wales) Ray Reardon	0–2	(England) John Virgo	
(Wales) Ray Reardon	1–2	(Northern Ireland) Dennis Taylor	
(Northern Ireland) Dennis Taylor	2–0	(England) Joe Johnson	
(Wales) Ray Reardon	2–0	(England) Joe Johnson	
(England) John Virgo	1–2	(England) Joe Johnson	

=== Group 3 ===
Player 1	Score	Player 2	Date
(Wales) Doug Mountjoy	2–0	(England) Jimmy White	
(England) Graham Miles	2–1	(England) Jimmy White	
(Wales) Doug Mountjoy	0–2	(England) Graham Miles	
(Wales) Terry Griffiths	2–1	(England) Jimmy White	
(Wales) Terry Griffiths	2–1	(England) Graham Miles	
(Wales) Terry Griffiths	2–1	(Wales) Doug Mountjoy	

=== Group 4 ===
Player 1	Score	Player 2	Date
(Canada) Cliff Thorburn	2–0	(England) Tony Meo	
(England) David Taylor	2–1	(England) Tony Meo	
(Canada) Cliff Thorburn	1–2	(England) David Taylor	
(Northern Ireland) Alex Higgins	1–2	(England) David Taylor	
(Canada) Cliff Thorburn	1–2	(Northern Ireland) Alex Higgins	
(Northern Ireland) Alex Higgins	0–2	(England) Tony Meo	

=== Semi-final Group 1 ===
Player 1	Score	Player 2	Date
(England) John Virgo	2–0	(England) Ray Edmonds	
(Northern Ireland) Dennis Taylor	0–2	(England) John Virgo	
(Northern Ireland) Dennis Taylor	1–2	(England) Ray Edmonds	
(England) Steve Davis	2–1	(Northern Ireland) Dennis Taylor	
(England) Steve Davis	2–0	(England) Ray Edmonds	
(England) Steve Davis	2–0	(England) John Virgo	

=== Semi-final Group 2 ===
Player 1	Score	Player 2	Date
(Canada) Cliff Thorburn	2–1	(England) David Taylor	
(Canada) Cliff Thorburn	2–1	(England) Graham Miles	
(England) David Taylor	0–2	(England) Graham Miles	
(Wales) Terry Griffiths	2–1	(Canada) Cliff Thorburn	
(Wales) Terry Griffiths	2–0	(England) Graham Miles	
(Wales) Terry Griffiths	2–0	(England) David Taylor	

=== Final ===
Final: Best of 17 frames. Referee: Assembly Rooms, Derby, England. 7 March 1982.
Steve Davis; England	9–7	Terry Griffiths; Wales
120–0 (74), 50–78 (Davis 55), 11–91 (83), 39–76 (67), 53–37, 74–9 (74), 64–53 (50), 62–69, 71–42, 52–82 (Griffiths 52), 73–54 (73), 29–83, 93–28 (68), 82–30 (80), 65–77 (Davis 59, Griffiths 55), 135–0 (135)
135	Highest break	83
1	Century breaks	0
7	50+ breaks	6

== Qualifying ==
=== Group 1 ===
Player 1	Score	Player 2	Date
(England) Willie Thorne	0–2	(England) Jimmy White	
(England) Graham Miles	0–2	(England) Jimmy White	
(England) Fred Davis	0–2	(England) Jimmy White	
(England) Willie Thorne	2–1	(England) Fred Davis	
(England) Graham Miles	2–0	(England) Fred Davis	
(England) Willie Thorne	1–2	(England) Graham Miles	

=== Group 2 ===
Player 1	Score	Player 2	Date
(England) John Virgo	2–1	(England) Dave Martin	
(England) John Virgo	2–1	(England) Joe Johnson	
(England) John Spencer	0–2	(England) John Virgo	
(England) John Spencer	2–0	(England) Dave Martin	
(England) John Spencer	1–2	(England) Joe Johnson	
(England) Joe Johnson	2–0	(England) Dave Martin	

=== Group 3 ===
Player 1	Score	Player 2	Date
(England) Tony Meo	2–0	(England) Mike Watterson	
(England) Tony Meo	2–0	(England) Jim Meadowcroft	
(England) Jim Meadowcroft	2–1	(England) Mike Watterson	
(Northern Ireland) Alex Higgins	2–1	(England) Mike Watterson	
(Northern Ireland) Alex Higgins	2–1	(England) Tony Meo	
(Northern Ireland) Alex Higgins	2–0	(England) Jim Meadowcroft	

=== Group 4 ===
Player 1	Score	Player 2	Date
(Canada) Kirk Stevens	2–1	(England) Dean Reynolds	
(Canada) Kirk Stevens	2–1	(England) Tony Knowles	
(Canada) Kirk Stevens	2–0	(England) Ray Edmonds	
(England) Tony Knowles	1–2	(England) Dean Reynolds	
(England) Tony Knowles	2–0	(England) Ray Edmonds	
(England) Ray Edmonds	2–0	(England) Dean Reynolds	
