= 1979 Pontins Professional =

Tournament information
- Dates: 5–12 May 1979
- Venue: Pontin's
- City: Prestatyn
- Country: Wales
- Organisation: WPBSA
- Format: Non-ranking event
- Winner's share: £1,500

Final
- Champion: (Wales) Doug Mountjoy
- Runner-up: (England) Graham Miles
- Score: 8–4

The 1979 Pontins Professional was the sixth edition of the professional invitational snooker tournament which took place between 5 and 12 May 1979 in Prestatyn, Wales.

The tournament featured eight professional players. Four players advance to the semi-final while the other four were eliminated in the group stage. All frames were played during the group stage matches.

Doug Mountjoy won the event, beating Graham Miles 8–4 in the final.

== Group stage ==
- (England) Fred Davis 4–3 Ian Anderson (Australia)
- (England) Steve Davis 4–3 Ian Anderson (Australia)
- (England) Steve Davis 5–2 Fred Davis (England)
- (England) Steve Davis 6–1 Ray Reardon (Wales)
- (England) Graham Miles 4–3 Doug Mountjoy (Wales)
- (England) Graham Miles 5–2 Perrie Mans (South Africa)
- (Wales) Doug Mountjoy 5–2 John Spencer (England)
- (Wales) Doug Mountjoy 6–1 Perrie Mans (South Africa)
- (Wales) Ray Reardon 5–2 Fred Davis (England)
- (Wales) Ray Reardon 6–1 Ian Anderson (Australia)
- (England) John Spencer 4–3 Graham Miles (England)
- (England) John Spencer 5–2 Perrie Mans (South Africa)

== Knockout stage ==
Semi-final; Best of 7 frames
(Wales) Doug Mountjoy	4
(Wales) Ray Reardon	3
(England) Graham Miles	4
(England) Steve Davis	0

Final; Best of 15 frames
(Wales) Doug Mountjoy	8
(England) Graham Miles	4
