= 1981 Tolly Cobbold Classic =

Tolly Cobbold Classic
Tournament information
- Dates: February 1981
- Venue: Corn Exchange
- City: Ipswich
- Country: England
- Organisation: WPBSA
- Format: Non-ranking event
- Winner's share: £2,000

Final
- Champion: (England) Graham Miles
- Runner-up: (Canada) Cliff Thorburn
- Score: 5–1

The 1981 Tolly Cobbold Classic was the third edition of the professional invitational snooker tournament, which took place between 24th and 25 February 1981 at the Corn Exchange in Ipswich, England.

Graham Miles won the tournament beating Cliff Thorburn 5–1 in the final.

== Group phase ==
All matches in the group phase were played over four frames.

- (England) Graham Miles 4–0 Alex Higgins (Northern Ireland)
- (England) Graham Miles 4–0 Kirk Stevens (Canada)
- (Canada) Kirk Stevens 3–1 Alex Higgins (Northern Ireland)
- (Canada) Cliff Thorburn 2–2 Graham Miles (England)
- (Canada) Cliff Thorburn 4–0 Kirk Stevens (Canada)
- (Canada) Cliff Thorburn 4–2 Alex Higgins (Northern Ireland)

== Final ==
Final; Best of 9 frames
(England) Graham Miles	5
(Canada) Cliff Thorburn	1

== Third-place play-off ==
Play-off; Best of 3 frames
(Canada) Kirk Stevens	2
(Northern Ireland) Alex Higgins	0
