= Golden Masters =

Former professional snooker tournament

Tournament information
- Venue: Queen's Hall
- Location: Newtownards
- Country: Northern Ireland
- Established: 1978
- Organisation(s): WPBSA
- Format: Invitational event
- Final year: 1979
- Final champion: (Wales) Ray Reardon

The Golden Masters was a professional invitational snooker tournament held for two editions in Newtownards, Northern Ireland. Sponsored by McEwan's lager, both tournaments were won by Welsh players (Doug Mountjoy and Ray Reardon).

The tournament featured four professionals - Ray Reardon, Dennis Taylor, Doug Mountjoy and Graham Miles.

== Winners ==
Year	Winner	Runner-up	Final score	Season
1978	(Wales) Doug Mountjoy	(Wales) Ray Reardon	4–2	1977/78
1979	(Wales) Ray Reardon	(England) Graham Miles	4–2	1978/79
