= 1977 Benson & Hedges Ireland Tournament =

Benson & Hedges Ireland Tournament
Tournament information
- Dates: 17–18 February 1977
- Venue: Leopardstown Racecourse
- City: Dublin
- Country: Ireland
- Organisation: WPBSA
- Format: Non-ranking event
- Winner's share: £750
- Highest break: (Northern Ireland) Alex Higgins (126)

Final
- Champion: (Northern Ireland) Alex Higgins
- Runner-up: (Wales) Ray Reardon
- Score: 5–3

The 1977 Benson & Hedges Ireland Tournament was the third edition of the professional invitational snooker tournament and took place in February 1977. For the second year running the tournament featured four professional players, although defending champion John Spencer did not compete this year and was replaced by Ray Reardon. The prize fund for the winner this year was £750, up from £600 the previous year.

In a format tweak to the previous year, the four players competed in a group format, with the top two winning the most frames advancing to the final. Higgins earned £100 for the tournament high break - 126 in his group match with Taylor. Reardon topped the group, with Higgins and Taylor tied for second. In a one-frame shoot-out, Higgins defeated Taylor 71-57 and advanced to the final, in which he defeated Reardon 5–3.

== Main draw ==
=== Group stage ===
| POS | Player | MP | MW | FW | FL | PTS |
|---|---|---|---|---|---|---|
| 1 | (Wales) Ray Reardon | 3 | 2 | 10 | 5 | 10 |
| 2 | (Northern Ireland) Dennis Taylor | 3 | 2 | 7 | 8 | 7 |
| 2 | (Northern Ireland) Alex Higgins | 3 | 1 | 7 | 8 | 7 |
| 4 | (England) Graham Miles | 3 | 1 | 6 | 9 | 6 |

- Alex Higgins 4–1 Dennis Taylor
- Ray Reardon 4–1 Graham Miles
- Dennis Taylor 3–2 Graham Miles
- Ray Reardon 4–1 Alex Higgins
- Graham Miles 3–2 Alex Higgins
- Dennis Taylor 3–2 Ray Reardon

=== Group playoff ===
- (Northern Ireland) Alex Higgins 71–57 Dennis Taylor (Northern Ireland) (one-frame shoot-out)

=== Final ===
- (Northern Ireland) Alex Higgins 5–3 Ray Reardon (Wales)
