= 1975 Ladbroke International (snooker) =

Professional invitational team snooker event

Tournament information
- Dates: 1975
- Format: Non-ranking team event

Final
- Champion: Rest of the World
- Runner-up: England

The 1975 Ladbroke International was a professional invitational team snooker tournament, that took place from 3 to 6 January 1975 and was recorded by Thames Television for broadcast. The event featured two teams, "England" and "Rest of the World", with representatives from each team playing single frame matches. The winning team was determined by the aggregate score in points across all matches. The "Rest of the World" team won by 113 points.

The "England" team was Rex Williams, Fred Davis, Graham Miles, John Spencer and John Pulman. The "Rest of the World" team was Ray Reardon (Wales), Eddie Charlton (Australia), Cliff Thorburn (Canada) and Alex Higgins and Jackie Rea (both Northern Ireland).

Broadcasts were on ITV from 7 April 1975, with commentary by Shaw Taylor.

== Results ==
Rest of the World player(s)	Score	England player(s)	Cumulative score difference
Ray Reardon (WAL)	88–41	Rex Williams (ENG)	47
Eddie Charlton (AUS)	19–100	Fred Davis (ENG)	-34
Jackie Rea (NIR)	70–52	Graham Miles (ENG)	-16
Ray Reardon (WAL) & Alex Higgins (NIR)	41–81	John Spencer (ENG) & Rex Williams (ENG)	-56
Cliff Thorburn (CAN)	64–58	John Pulman (ENG)	-50
Alex Higgins (NIR)	95–43	John Spencer (ENG)	2
Cliff Thorburn (CAN) & Eddie Charlton (AUS)	91–24	Graham Miles (ENG) & Fred Davis (ENG)	69
Jackie Rea (NIR)	39–63	John Pulman (ENG)	45
Cliff Thorburn (CAN)	73–43	Rex Williams (ENG)	75
Alex Higgins (NIR) & Jackie Rea (NIR)	100–21	John Pulman (ENG) & Fred Davis (ENG)	154
Eddie Charlton (AUS)	45–66	Graham Miles (ENG)	133
Alex Higgins (NIR)	57–55	Fred Davis (ENG)	135
Ray Reardon (WAL)	47–69	John Spencer (ENG)	113
