= Graham Miles =

English snooker player (1941–2014)

Personal information
- Born: 11 May 1941 Birmingham, England
- Died: 12 October 2014 (aged 73)

Sport
- Country: England
- Sport: Snooker
- Professional: 1971–1994
- Highest ranking: 5 (1976/77)
- Best ranking finish: Runner-up (x1)

Graham Miles (11 May 1941 – 12 October 2014) was an English snooker player.

== Career ==
Miles turned professional in 1971. He first gained recognition in 1974, when he reached the final of the World Championship, losing 12–22 to Ray Reardon. As he was left-eye dominant, the right-handed Miles developed an idiosyncratic sighting style with his cue crossing his chin on the left side. This style became more pronounced over time, to the point where the cue ran beneath his left ear.

Miles became one of the best known players in Britain, in an era when there was little televised snooker other than the Pot Black series. He won this tournament at his first attempt in 1974 (after entering as a late replacement for Fred Davis, who withdrew because of illness) and again in 1975. Other notable moments in his career included reaching the final of the 1976 Masters, where he again lost to Reardon.

The 1978/79 season saw something of a purple patch for Miles. At the 1978 UK Championship, he defeated Rex Williams 9–8 and then easily beat Willie Thorne 9–1, which included what was then a championship record break of 139 in the last frame. However, he was then dispatched 1–9 by eventual winner Doug Mountjoy.

This form continued in January 1979, when he reached the final of the Holsten Lager International by defeating John Pulman, Dennis Taylor and Alex Higgins. He led John Spencer 7–6 in the final, having made a break of 107, but eventually lost 7–11 to take £2,000 as runner-up.

Miles led defending champion Ray Reardon 3–0 and 5–3 in the first round of the 1979 World Championship, but he came down with flu and lost 8–13. Straight after this, Miles defeated Doug Mountjoy 4–3 and Perrie Mans 5–2 in the group stages of the Pontins Professional Event. Miles then beat Steve Davis 4–0 in the semi-final but lost 4–8 in the final to Doug Mountjoy.

At the inaugural World Team Cup, Miles represented England along with John Spencer and Fred Davis, where they reached the final only to be beaten 3–14 by Wales. His last major victory was the 1981 Tolly Cobbold Classic, when he beat Cliff Thorburn 5–1 in Ipswich. During the 1980s, he slid down the rankings, and 1984 saw his last appearance at the World Championship.

== Personal life and death ==
After retiring from the game in 1992, Miles ran two snooker clubs at Sandwell, West Midlands and one in Crewe, Cheshire. He came out of retirement to play at the Seniors Pot Black competition in 1997.

Miles died on 12 October 2014, aged 73.

== Performance and rankings timeline ==
Tournament	1971/ 72	1972/ 73	1973/ 74	1974/ 75	1975/ 76	1976/ 77	1977/ 78	1978/ 79	1979/ 80	1980/ 81	1981/ 82	1982/ 83	1983/ 84	1984/ 85	1985/ 86	1986/ 87	1987/ 88	1988/ 89	1989/ 90	1990/ 91	1991/ 92	1993/ 94
Ranking	No ranking system					5	8	9	9	16	16	18	22	32	36	52	68	65	78	94	101	254
Ranking tournaments
Dubai Classic (Note: The event was also called the Dubai Masters (1988/1989))	Tournament Not Held																	NR	1R	LQ	A	A
Grand Prix (Note: The event was also called the Professional Players Tournament (1982/93–1983/1984))	Tournament Not Held											1R	2R	2R	2R	1R	1R	LQ	LQ	1R	LQ	LQ
UK Championship	Tournament Not Held						Non-Ranking Event							LQ	1R	1R	2R	LQ	LQ	LQ	LQ	LQ
European Open	Tournament Not Held																	LQ	LQ	LQ	A	A
Welsh Open	Tournament Not Held																				LQ	LQ
International Open (Note: The event was also called the Matchroom Trophy (1985/1986))	Tournament Not Held										NR	LQ	1R	LQ	1R	1R	LQ	1R	LQ	Not Held		LQ
Thailand Open (Note: The event was also called the Thailand Masters (1983/1984–1986/1987) and the Asian Open (1989/1990–1993/1994))	Tournament Not Held												Non-Ranking Event				Not Held		1R	LQ	A	A
British Open (Note: The event was also called the British Gold Cup (1979/1980), Yamaha Organs Trophy (1980/1981) and International Masters (1981/1982–1983/1984))	Tournament Not Held								Non-Ranking Event					3R	1R	LQ	1R	LQ	1R	LQ	LQ	LQ
World Championship	Non-Ranking		F	2R	1R	QF	QF	1R	1R	2R	2R	1R	1R	LQ	LQ	LQ	LQ	LQ	LQ	LQ	LQ	A
Non-ranking tournaments
The Masters	Not Held			QF	F	SF	QF	A	A	A	A	A	A	A	A	A	A	A	A	LQ	A	A
Pontins Professional	Not Held		A	QF	SF	SF	RR	F	A	A	A	A	A	A	A	A	A	A	A	A	A	A
Former ranking tournaments
Canadian Masters (Note: The event was also called the Canadian Open (1978/1979–1980/1981))	Not Held			Non-Ranking							Tournament Not Held				Non-Ranking			LQ	Tournament Not Held			
Hong Kong Open (Note: The event ran under different names as Australian Masters (1979/1980 to 1987/1988) and the Hong Kong Open (1989/1990).)	Tournament Not Held								Non-Ranking Event									NH	LQ	Not Held		
Classic	Tournament Not Held								Non-Ranking Event				LQ	LQ	LQ	LQ	LQ	1R	LQ	LQ	LQ	NH
Strachan Open	Tournament Not Held																				LQ	MR
Former non-ranking tournaments
Men of the Midlands	SF	A	Tournament Not Held																			
World Championship	LQ	QF	Ranking Event																			
Norwich Union Open	Not Held		QF	QF	Tournament Not Held																	
Watney Open	Not Held			QF	Tournament Not Held																	
Canadian Masters (Note: The event was also called the Canadian Open (1978/1979–1980/1981))	Not Held			SF	SF	A	A	A	A	A	Tournament Not Held				A	A	A	R	Tournament Not Held			
Canadian Club Masters	Tournament Not Held				QF	Tournament Not Held																
World Matchplay Championship	Tournament Not Held					SF	Tournament Not Held															
Benson & Hedges Ireland Tournament	Not Held			A	SF	RR	A	A	A	A	A	A	A	A	A	A	A	A	A	A	A	A
Holsten Lager International	Tournament Not Held							F	Tournament Not Held													
Bombay International	Tournament Not Held							RR	Tournament Not Held													
Golden Masters	Tournament Not Held						SF	F	Tournament Not Held													
Limosin International	Tournament Not Held								QF	Tournament Not Held												
Pot Black	A	A	W	W	RR	RR	F	SF	RR	A	A	A	A	A	A	Tournament Not Held				A	A	NH
Padmore Super Crystalate	Tournament Not Held								QF	Tournament Not Held												
Pontins Camber Sands	Tournament Not Held								SF	Tournament Not Held												
Champion of Champions	Tournament Not Held							A	NH	RR	Tournament Not Held											
Classic	Tournament Not Held								A	QF	A	A	Ranking Event								Not Held	
International Open (Note: The event was also called the Goya Matchroom Trophy (1985/1986))	Tournament Not Held										QF	Ranking Event								Tournament Not Held		
Tolly Cobbold Classic	Tournament Not Held							A	A	W	SF	A	A	Tournament Not Held								
UK Championship	Tournament Not Held						QF	SF	2R	1R	2R	1R	1R	Ranking Event								
British Open (Note: The event was also called the British Gold Cup (1979/1980), Yamaha Organs Trophy (1980/1981) and International Masters (1981/1982–1983/1984))	Tournament Not Held								RR	RR	2R	LQ	LQ	Ranking Event								
English Professional Championship	Tournament Not Held							QF	Not Held			1R	1R	1R	LQ	1R	Tournament Not Held					
Shoot-Out	Tournament Not Held																			1R	Not Held	

Performance Table Legend
LQ	lost in the qualifying draw	#R	lost in the early rounds of the tournament (WR = Wildcard round, RR = Round robin)	QF	lost in the quarter-finals
SF	lost in the semi-finals	F	lost in the final	W	won the tournament
DNQ	did not qualify for the tournament	A	did not participate in the tournament	WD	withdrew from the tournament

NH / Not Held	means an event was not held.
NR / Non-Ranking Event	means an event is/was no longer a ranking event.
R / Ranking Event	means an event is/was a ranking event.

== Career finals ==
=== Ranking finals: 1 ===
Legend
World Championship (0–1)
Other (0–0)

Outcome	No.	Year	Championship	Opponent in the final	Score
Runner-up	1.	1974	World Snooker Championship	(Wales) Ray Reardon	12–22

=== Non-ranking finals: 10 (5 titles) ===
Legend
The Masters (0–1)
Other (5–4)

Outcome	No.	Year	Championship	Opponent in the final	Score
Winner	1.	1974	Pot Black	(England) John Spencer	2-0
Winner	2.	1974	Burscough Professional	Unknown (Note: Round-robin with Ray Reardon, John Spencer, and John Pulman)	Round–Robin
Winner	3.	1975	Pot Black (2)	(Northern Ireland) Dennis Taylor	1–0
Runner-up	1.	1976	The Masters	(Wales) Ray Reardon	3–7
Winner	4.	1977	Castle Professional Tournament	(England) Bernard Bennett	Shared Title
Runner-up	2.	1978	Pot Black	(Wales) Doug Mountjoy	1–2
Runner-up	3.	1979	Holsten Lager International	(England) John Spencer	7–11
Runner-up	4.	1979	Pontins Professional	(Wales) Doug Mountjoy	4–8
Runner-up	5.	1979	Golden Masters	(Wales) Ray Reardon	2–4
Winner	5.	1981	Tolly Cobbold Classic	(Canada) Cliff Thorburn	5–1

=== Pro-am finals: 1 (1 title) ===
Outcome	No.	Year	Championship	Opponent in the final	Score
Winner	1.	1973	Castle Open	(England) Jim Meadowcroft	4–1

=== Team finals: 2 ===
Outcome	No.	Year	Championship	Team/partner	Opponent(s) in the final	Score
Runner-up	1.	1975	Ladbroke International	England	Rest of the World	Cumulative score
Runner-up	2.	1979	World Challenge Cup	England	Wales	3–14
