= 1979 Golden Masters =

Golden Masters
Tournament information
- Dates: 9 June 1979
- Venue: Queen's Hall
- City: Newtownards
- Country: Northern Ireland
- Organisation: WPBSA
- Format: Non-ranking event
- Total prize fund: £2,000
- Winner's share: £750

Final
- Champion: (Wales) Ray Reardon
- Runner-up: (England) Graham Miles
- Score: 4–2

The 1979 McEwans Golden Masters was an invitational snooker tournament which took place on 9 June 1979 at the Queen's Hall in Newtownards, Northern Ireland. Similar to the previous year, the tournament featured four professional players - Ray Reardon, Dennis Taylor, Doug Mountjoy and Graham Miles.

Reardon won the title beating Miles 4–2 in the final.

== Main draw ==
Semi-finals; Best of 5 frames
(Wales) Ray Reardon	3
(Wales) Doug Mountjoy	1
(England) Graham Miles	3
(Northern Ireland) Dennis Taylor	2

Final; Best of 7 frames
(Wales) Ray Reardon	4
(England) Graham Miles	2
