= 1978 Golden Masters =

Golden Masters
Tournament information
- Dates: 10 June 1978
- Venue: Queen's Hall
- City: Newtownards
- Country: Northern Ireland
- Organisation: WPBSA
- Format: Non-ranking event
- Total prize fund: £2,000
- Winner's share: £750

Final
- Champion: (Wales) Doug Mountjoy
- Runner-up: (Wales) Ray Reardon
- Score: 4–2

The 1978 McEwans Golden Masters was an invitational snooker tournament which took place on 10 June 1978 at the Queen's Hall in Newtownards, Northern Ireland. The tournament featured four professional players - Ray Reardon, Dennis Taylor, Doug Mountjoy and Graham Miles.

Mountjoy won the title beating Reardon 4–2 in the final.

== Main draw ==
Semi-finals; Best of 5 frames
(Wales) Doug Mountjoy	3
(Northern Ireland) Dennis Taylor	2
(Wales) Ray Reardon	3
(England) Graham Miles	0

Final; Best of 7 frames
(Wales) Doug Mountjoy	4
(Wales) Ray Reardon	2
Third place
(Northern Ireland) Dennis Taylor	3
(England) Graham Miles	0
