= 1977 Masters (snooker) =

Professional non-ranking snooker tournament, Feb 1977

1977 Benson & Hedges Masters
Tournament information
- Dates: 7–11 February 1977
- Venue: New London Theatre
- City: London
- Country: England
- Format: Non-ranking event
- Total prize fund: £5,200
- Winner's share: £2,000
- Highest break: Doug Mountjoy (WAL) (88)

Final
- Champion: Doug Mountjoy (WAL)
- Runner-up: Ray Reardon (WAL)
- Score: 7–6

The 1977 Masters (officially the 1977 Benson & Hedges Masters) was a professional non-ranking snooker tournament that took place between 7 and 11 February 1977 at the New London Theatre in London, England. It was organised by representatives of the sponsors, cigarette brand Benson & Hedges, and sanctioned by the World Professional Billiards and Snooker Association. Ten players were invited to participate.

Ray Reardon was the defending champion, having defeated Graham Miles 7–3 in the 1976 final. Doug Mountjoy, who was a replacement after Eddie Charlton dropped out, won his first professional title, defeating Reardon 7–6 in the final. Mountjoy made the highest break of the tournament, 88, in the tenth frame of the final.

An English billiards tournament was held alongside the snooker, won by Rex Williams who defeated Fred Davis, by 277 points to 153.

== Overview ==
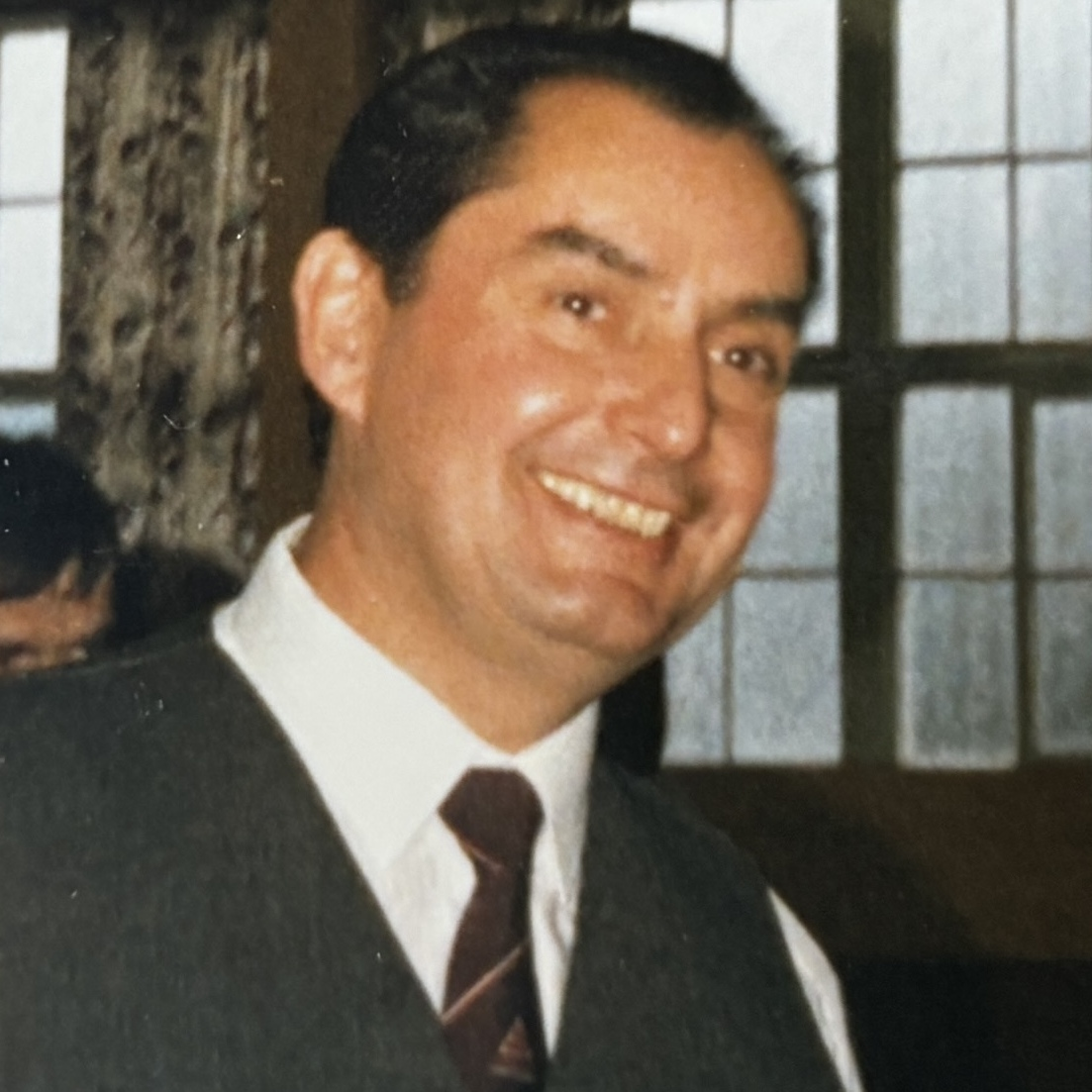
Ray Reardon (pictured circa 1983) was the defending champion.

The 1977 Masters was staged at the New London Theatre in Drury Lane, London, with ten invited players and was the third edition of the Masters after its establishment in 1975. It was organised by representatives of the sponsors, cigarette brand Benson & Hedges, and sanctioned by the World Professional Billiards and Snooker Association. Anthony Holden wrote in The Sunday Times that the event was "lavish enough to be dubbed the game's 'showcase event.'"

Ray Reardon was the defending champion, having defeated Graham Miles 7–3 in the 1976 final. The top eight players on the world ranking list were invited, along with Dennis Taylor (ranked ninth) and John Pulman (ranked fifteenth) as wild cards. Perrie Mans was included for the first time, replacing Cliff Thorburn. Eddie Charlton withdrew because of business commitments and was replaced by Doug Mountjoy, who had won the World Amateur Snooker Championship in October 1976 and then turned professional.

Highlights of the 1977 Masters final were broadcast as part of Grandstand on BBC1, with commentary by Ted Lowe.

=== Prize fund ===
The winner of the event received £2,000 from a total prize fund of £5,200. The breakdown of prize money for the event, where known, is shown below:

- Winner: £2,000
- Runner-up: £1,000
- Semi-finals: £500
- Total: £5,200

== Summary ==
=== First round ===
First round matches were played on 7 and 8 February as the best-of-seven frames. Doug Mountjoy won the first and third frames both on the final black ball and made a break of 87 in the second frame, to establish a 3–0 lead against John Pulman. Pulman took the next two frames, then Mountjoy sealed a 4–2 win with a break of 64. John Spencer and Dennis Taylor were level at 2–2. Spencer went on to win 4–2, compiling a break of 66 in the sixth frame.

=== Quarter-finals ===
The quarter-finals were played from 7 to 9 February as the best-of-seven frames. Ray Reardon, holder of both Masters and World Professional Snooker Championship titles, faced the reigning World Professional Billiards Champion, Rex Williams. Williams took a 38-point lead in the first frame, but lost it after Reardon made breaks of 23, 43 and 20. A break of 84 by Reardon won him the second frame, then he took a 3–0 lead after breaks of 30 and 22. Williams took the fourth frame with a break of 43. Breaks of 40 and 33 contributed to Reardon completing a 4–1 win. Reardon, who said "I love it when something goes a little bit wrong. I need a bit of aggro to get my adrenaline going", commented that Williams "started well, didn't he? Worst thing he could have done."

Graham Miles defeated Spencer 4–1. Miles made breaks of at least 32 in each frame; he lost frame four despite making a break of 51. Fred Davis won the second frame on the black to establish a 2–0 lead against Mountjoy. Mountjoy levelled at 2–2 and, with breaks of 53 and 50, added the fourth frame with 115 points to 0 and the fifth by 82 points to 7. Perrie Mans won the first frame against Alex Higgins on the final black ball. Breaks of 45 in frame two and 63 in frame three gave Higgins a 2–1 lead. Mans took frame four, and Higgins took the lead again by clearing the colours in frame five. Mans led on points in the sixth frame before breaks of 31 and 25 by Higgins secured his victory at 4–2.

=== Semi-finals ===
The semi-finals were held on 10 February as the best-of-nine frames. Reardon moved into a 3–1 lead against Miles, and although Miles made it 3–2, Reardon went on to win 5–2. The match report in the Daily Telegraph said that Reardon "potted soundly". In The Guardian, Clive Everton wrote that "Ray Reardon, who rarely raises to the heights in afternoon sessions, made an exception for Graham Miles".

Mountjoy sealed a 5–3 win against Higgins with a break of 54 in frame eight. Higgins was never ahead in the match, although he levelled the scoreline three times after Mountjoy had held a one-frame lead. The Snooker Scene report commented that the match "contained many errors" Higgins later wrote, "by [the semi-finals] I had tasted the nightlife of the Big Smoke and succumbed to my bad habits of late nights and too much booze. I was beaten fair and square by the new kid on the block, Doug Mountjoy".

=== Final ===
The final between Reardon and Mountjoy was played on 11 February as the best-of-13 frames across two sessions. John Street was the referee. Reardon won the opening frame, and added the second frame with a break of 51. He compiled an early break of 54 in the third frame and appeared to be heading for a 3–0 lead, but lost position, allowing Mountjoy to make his first significant contribution to the match and make it 2–1. The first session finished with them level at 3–3.

Mountjoy took the first frame of the second session, but Reardon equalised the match by winning frame eight. Reardon added frame nine with breaks of 22, 30 and 56. Mountjoy made a break of 88, the highest of the tournament, to win the 10th frame, after Reardon had committed a foul by potting a red when he broke into the pack of reds as he potted a black. Reardon regained the lead at 6–5 with a break of 75 in the twelfth frame, but Mountjoy responded immediately with a break of 76 to level the match at 6–6. In the deciding frame, Reardon missed an attempt to pot a black after the last red, and Mountjoy cleared the colours from yellow to pink to claim victory.

Mountjoy had started the event as a 33–1 outsider. The win was his first professional title. He said afterwards, "I feel as if I have leaped to the top of a mountain at the first attempt." In 1987, Reardon recalled that "The final with Doug was a great match. It was close; there were big breaks in almost every frame; and it's probably the most enjoyable match I've ever had in the competition, even though I lost." In 1982 he had written, "Mountjoy deserved his success, though I lost concentration a little."

Snooker Scene magazine described the final as an "engrossing match" and welcomed Mountjoy's victory, as it saw newcomers challenging the established order as being in the sport's best interests.

== Tournament draw ==
The draw for the tournament is shown below. The match winners are shown in bold.

**First round** Best of 7 frames
Dennis Taylor (NIR)	2
**John Spencer (ENG)**	**4**
John Pulman (ENG)	2
**Doug Mountjoy (WAL)**	**4**

**Quarter-finals**; Best of 7 frames
**Ray Reardon (WAL)**	**4**
Rex Williams (ENG)	1
**Graham Miles (ENG)**	**4**
John Spencer (ENG)	1
Fred Davis (ENG)	2
**Doug Mountjoy (WAL)**	**4**
**Alex Higgins (NIR)**	**4**
Perrie Mans (RSA)	2

**Semi-finals**; Best of 9 frames
**Ray Reardon (WAL)**	**5**
Graham Miles (ENG)	2
**Doug Mountjoy (WAL)**	**5**
Alex Higgins (NIR)	3

**Final**; Best of 13 frames
Ray Reardon (WAL)	6
**Doug Mountjoy (WAL)**	**7**

=== Final: details and frame scores ===
Final
Best of 13 frames. Referee: John Street; New London Theatre, London, England, 11 February 1977. Numbers in parentheses are breaks of 50 or more.
**Doug Mountjoy (WAL)**	**7**–6	Ray Reardon (WAL)
First session: 57–**74**, 21–**97** (51), **74**–60 (54), 49–**62**, **99**–6 (70), **96**–32 (78); Second session: **61**–29, 46–**73**, 6–**120** (56), **95**–28 (88), 59–**75** (75), **76**–25 (76), **55**–41
**88**	Highest break	75
4	50+ breaks	4

== Billiards ==
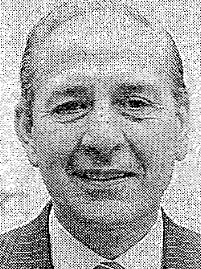
Rex Williams (pictured in 1988), the reigning World Billiards Champion since 1968, defeated Fred Davis in the final.

An English billiards tournament was held alongside the snooker. It was the first professional billiards event staged in London for almost 25 years. Seven of the players from the snooker tournament played for the right to meet Williams, world champion since 1968, in a match where £500 went to the winner.

In the first round, Higgins defeated Taylor, the 1968 under-19 British junior billiards champion, by 140–133. Taylor had not played billiards since winning the junior title, and commented that "If you don't play billiards, you lose all touch for the game." Davis, the under-16 British champion in 1928, and the holder of the UK Billiards title since it was last staged in 1951, made a break of 87 in his defeat of Miles. Pulman, a quarter-finalist in the English Amateur Billiards Championship in 1946, beat Mountjoy; Mountjoy commented "To me billiards is more difficult because I don't know what to do."

Spencer received a walkover when Higgins failed to appear for their second round match. Higgins had been practicing at the time, under the mistaken impression that the match was on the following day. Davis beat Pulman 175–66. In the play-off to meet Williams, Davis compiled a break of 219, the highest of the tournament, and 98, in his 392–74 defeat of Spencer. Davis led Williams 153–68 in the 45-minute final, but Williams made an unfinished break of 209 to secure victory at 277–153.

== Billiards tournament draw and results ==
The draw for the tournament is shown below. Players in bold denote match winners.

**First round** 30 minutes
**Alex Higgins (NIR)**	**140**
Dennis Taylor (NIR)	133
**John Pulman (ENG)**	**162**
Doug Mountjoy (WAL)	90
**Fred Davis (ENG)**	**150**
Graham Miles (ENG)	86

**Second round** 30 minutes
**John Spencer** (ENG)	**w/o**
Alex Higgins (NIR)	w/d
John Pulman (ENG)	66
**Fred Davis (ENG)**	**175**

**Third round** 45 minutes
John Spencer (ENG)	74
**Fred Davis (ENG)**	**392**

**Final**; 45 minutes
**Rex Williams (ENG)**	**277**
Fred Davis (ENG)	153
