= 1975 Masters (snooker) =

Professional non-ranking snooker tournament held in January 1975

1975 Benson & Hedges Masters
Tournament information
- Dates: 13–17 January 1975
- Venue: West Centre Hotel
- City: London
- Country: England
- Format: Single elimination; non-ranking event
- Total prize fund: £5,292
- Winner's share: £2,000
- Highest break: John Spencer (ENG) (92)

Final
- Champion: John Spencer (ENG)
- Runner-up: Ray Reardon (WAL)
- Score: 9–8

The 1975 Masters (officially the 1975 Benson & Hedges Masters) was a professional snooker tournament that took place from 13 to 17 January 1975 at the West Centre Hotel in London. It was the inaugural edition of the Masters and featured ten invited players. The tournament was organised by representatives of the cigarette brand Benson & Hedges and sanctioned by the World Professional Billiards and Snooker Association.

John Spencer won the event, defeating Ray Reardon 9–8 on a re-spotted black in the final frame. The highest break of the tournament was 92, made by Spencer in the first frame of the final.

The inaugural tournament was not considered a great success, with sparse attendance attributed in part to its venue, and difficult playing conditions caused by the television lighting. Benson & Hedges continued to sponsor the Masters annually until 2003, when UK restrictions on tobacco advertising ended the arrangement, and the tournament has continued since under different sponsors. It is now regarded as one of snooker's most prestigious events, forming part of the sport's "Triple Crown" alongside the World Snooker Championship and the UK Championship.

== Overview ==
The snooker journalist Clive Everton managed squash player Jonah Barrington and because of this got to know the sports sponsorship consultants Peter West and Patrick Nally. Everton suggested to West and Nally that in their pitch to tobacco company Gallaher, they include a proposal to sponsor snooker tournaments. West and Nally won a contract with Gallaher that led to the company sponsoring events under its Park Drive brand: Park Drive 2000 events in 1971 and 1972 and the World Snooker Championship in 1973 and 1974. The 1975 World Championship was scheduled to be played in Australia and Park Drive exited from the sport, but another Gallaher brand, Benson & Hedges, instituted the Masters for 1975. Ten leading professionals were invited, and the winner's prize of £2,000 was a record in the game. The tournament was held in the ballroom of the West Centre Hotel, London, which could accommodate 750 spectators. It was organised by representatives of Benson & Hedges and sanctioned by the World Professional Billiards and Snooker Association (WPBSA).

Leonard Owen, director of special events for the sponsors, said that their ambition was to make the Masters the most stylish event in snooker and to "recreate the atmosphere" of Leicester Square Hall. The chairman of the WPBSA, Rex Williams, who was one of the ten players invited to participate, commented that "The style and scope of this new event is a real boost for the game. It's what the professional players have been trying to achieve for some time." Reardon, who was the World Champion at the time of the event, later wrote that "Snooker's rise in social status was amply illustrated by a dinner jacket, champagne and smoked salmon setting for the Benson and Hedges Masters tournament". Television lighting was in place throughout the event for consistency, although only highlights of the final received television coverage. The broadcast was part of Grandstand on BBC1, with commentary by Ted Lowe.

=== Prize fund ===
The winner of the event received £2,000 from a total prize fund of £5,000 (excluding the highest break prize). The breakdown of prize money is shown below:

- Winner: £2,000
- Runner-up: £1,000
- Semi-finals: £500
- Quarter-finals: £250
- First round: £100
- Highest break: £92 (£1 per point)
- Total: £5,292

== Summary ==
=== First round ===
First-round matches were played on 13 January as the best of nine frames. Bill Werbeniuk was whitewashed 5–0 by Alex Higgins. Werbeniuk's cue had been stolen in December, and he was still not used to his new cue. He led by 31 points in frame two with one red remaining, but after losing that frame he never appeared to be in contention to win.

Cliff Thorburn won the first three frames against John Pulman by comfortable margins. Pulman then took the next four frames and in frame eight he fluked a snooker on the final blue ball; Thorburn failed to hit the blue and lost the frame and match.

=== Quarter-finals ===
The quarter-finals were played on 14 and 15 January as the best of nine frames. Graham Miles took a 2–0 lead against Ray Reardon, who had defeated him in the final of the 1974 World Snooker Championship. Reardon levelled the match at 2–2 and Miles won frame five. Miles lost frame six when he went in-off the re-spotted black. Reardon took the next two frames, to lead for the first time at 4–3 and then win 5–3. Rex Williams, the billiards world champion, trailed 0–3 to Higgins, but went on to win 5–3. The match report in Snooker Scene magazine said that although Williams's standard of potting was unremarkable, after winning frame four, "he dictated the pace of the game with his impeccable safety" and improved as the game went on and "nagged [Higgins] into impetuosity and error." The reporter wrote that Higgins missed many easy shots, "sometimes after playing a shot of extraordinary virtuosity."

Fred Davis took a 3–1 lead against Eddie Charlton and looked likely to lead 4–1, but he missed a straightforward pot on the final pink ball and Charlton potted the pink to win the frame. Charlton added the next three frames and won 5–3. The match was described in The Daily Telegraph as "a dogged battle full of errors and hardly worthy of the 'Masters' tag." Pulman recovered from 0–3 to 2–3 against John Spencer, the player who had defeated him in 1968 to end his ten-year reign as World Champion. Spencer won frame six 87–9 and Pulman took frame seven with a break of 64. Spencer won the match in frame eight with a break of 46.

=== Semi-finals ===
The semi-finals were held on 16 January as the best of nine frames. Spencer compiled a break of 73, the highest in the tournament at that point, in the second frame against Charlton, for a 2–0 lead. He made a break of 49 in the third frame, but Charlton made a clearance of 44 to take the frame. Spencer moved into a 4–1 lead and won the match 5–3.

Reardon defeated Williams 5–4 in a match described by Snooker Scene magazine as "one of the most gripping matches of the season". Williams's consistent safety play kept pressure on Reardon throughout. Williams won the opening frame, aided by breaks of 21 and 32, and followed it with breaks of 34 and 23 to take the second frame. Reardon responded with a break of 61 to win the third frame and then levelled the match at 2–2, but Williams regained the lead in the next frame with a break of 42. Reardon then equalised with a break of 63 in the sixth frame. According to Snooker Scene, Williams generally controlled the tactical exchanges and demonstrated tighter concentration. Williams went into a 4–3 lead before Reardon squared the match at 4–4, setting up a deciding frame that was tightly fought and low-scoring, with neither player managing a break above 20. In the closing stages, Reardon appeared to have secured the win with a long shot sending the blue into a top pocket, but the frame remained unsettled as both players became snookered in the following exchanges; Reardon went in-off attempting to escape one of them. Williams also had an opportunity when he fluked a snooker of his own, and later had a further chance to win the frame but was unable to convert it. Reardon ultimately won the match by potting a pink down the middle of the table at a half-ball angle.

=== Final ===
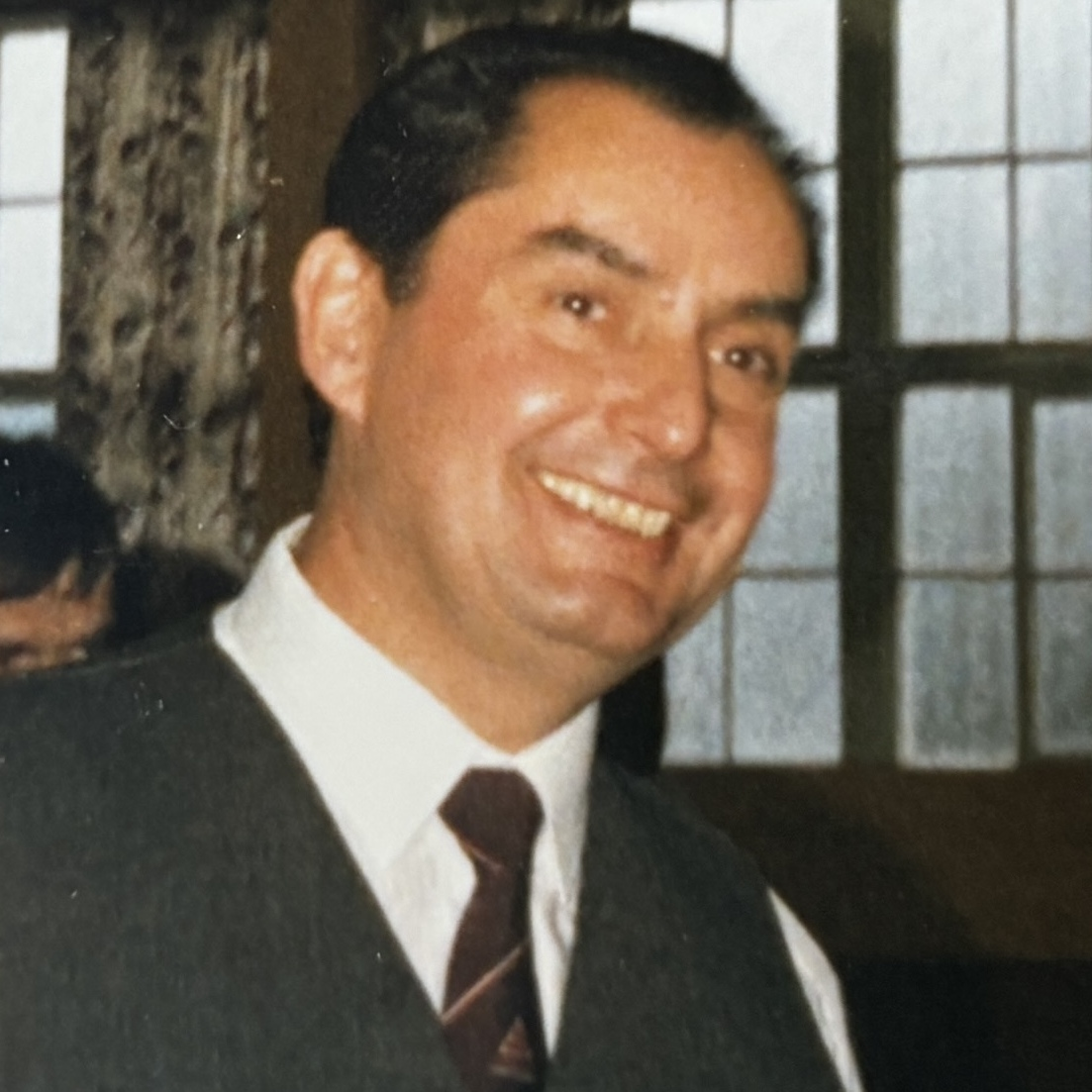
Ray Reardon (pictured circa 1983) lost the final on a re-spotted black.

The final between Spencer and Reardon was played on 17 January as the best of 17 frames across two sessions. Gus Lillygreen was the referee. In the first frame, Spencer made a 92 break, the highest of the tournament. During the first session of eight frames, Spencer was a frame ahead four times with Reardon levelling the match each time.

In the evening session, the highest break by each player was only 37. Reardon's break of 37 contributed to him taking the lead at 5–4; Spencer's 37 in frame ten helped him to draw level. According to the match report in Snooker Scene magazine, "As the session wore on ... mistakes became more and more frequent." Reardon was in the lead at 6–5 and the pair were level at 6–6. In the 13th frame, Reardon was on the final pink ball, needing to pot that and the black to win the frame, when he jumped the cue ball over the pink, leaving it pottable for Spencer. Spencer failed to take that opportunity and Reardon won the frame, also adding frame 14 for 8–6. Spencer won frames 15 and 16 to force a decider.

In the deciding frame, Reardon was on a break when he was disturbed by the presentation party getting ready. In 1987, the snooker journalist Janice Hale described how the "golden haired, golden clad" women of the party started to make their way down to the playing area while Reardon was on the colours in the final frame. She added that Reardon recalled they were "Altogether. Just like the Tiller Girls. I can see the funny side of it now." Reardon had been 33 points behind at one point, but when he potted the final black both players had 58 points, meaning that the match would be decided on a re-spotted black. After Reardon had played the ball first, Spencer potted the re-spotted black from distance to claim victory. Spencer remarked afterwards, "I'm not going to thank Ray for giving me a match like that. If I have any more like that I won't be playing snooker for long. I will be a nervous wreck."

== Reception and legacy ==
Ian Morrison wrote in The Hamlyn Encyclopedia of Snooker (1987) that "the tournament was not a resounding success in its first year, largely because of its location". An editorial in Snooker Scene noted that the event attracted "sparse crowds – barely a hundred for some sessions" and suggested that the short time between the announcement of the event and its staging contributed to this. The ticket prices were double those of the recent 1974 Norwich Union Open, which, the editorial commented, seemed to be designed to "attract an exclusive, upper crust type audience composed of the sort of people Gallahers believe smoke their classiest brand." Formal dress was advised for the audience, with evening dress required for the final. The television lighting that was in place throughout the tournament caused dry conditions, making the balls run very quickly on the table as the event progressed. Everton's assessment was that the table was "running between seven and eight lengths, as opposed to the ideal five and a half." The Snooker Scene editorial suggested that these conditions meant that players played less freely: "Tentative cueing engenders mistakes and any imperfections tended to be magnified by the far from true table."

Benson & Hedges continued to sponsor the annual Masters until 2003, after which they were prevented from doing so by UK restrictions on tobacco advertising. The event was staged at the New London Theatre from 1976 to 1978 and then at Wembley Conference Centre. The tournament has continued on an annual basis with different sponsors and is regarded as a prestigious event, forming part of snooker's "Triple Crown" together with the World Snooker Championship and the UK Championship.

== Tournament draw ==
The draw of the tournament is shown below. The match winners are shown in bold.

**First round** Best of 9 frames
**Alex Higgins (NIR)**	**5**
Bill Werbeniuk (CAN)	0
**John Pulman (ENG)**	**5**
Cliff Thorburn (CAN)	3

**Quarter-finals**; Best of 9 frames
**Ray Reardon (WAL)**	**5**
Graham Miles (ENG)	3
**Rex Williams (ENG)**	**5**
Alex Higgins (NIR)	3
Fred Davis (ENG)	3
**Eddie Charlton (AUS)**	**5**
**John Spencer (ENG)**	**5**
John Pulman (ENG)	3

**Semi-finals**; Best of 9 frames
**Ray Reardon (WAL)**	**5**
Rex Williams (ENG)	4
Eddie Charlton (AUS)	2
**John Spencer (ENG)**	**5**

**Final**; Best of 17 frames
Ray Reardon (WAL)	8
**John Spencer (ENG)**	**9**

=== Final: details and frame scores ===
Final
Best of 17 frames. Referee: Gus Lillygreen; West Centre Hotel, London, England, 17 January 1975. Numbers in parentheses are breaks over 50.
**John Spencer (ENG)**	**9**–8	Ray Reardon (WAL)
First session: **121**–13 (92), 52–**81**, **63**–37, 59–**68** (Spencer 57), **67**–51, 22–**77**, **82**–22 (70), 16–**96**; Second session: 46–**63**, **68**–20, 50–**72**, **68**–40, 57–**63**, 22–**82**, **53**–3, **64**–25, **65**–58
**92**	Highest break	40
**3**	50+ breaks	0
