= 1976 Masters (snooker) =

Professional non-ranking snooker tournament, Jan 1976

1976 Benson & Hedges Masters
Tournament information
- Dates: 26–30 January 1976
- Venue: New London Theatre
- City: London
- Country: England
- Format: Single elimination; non-Ranking event
- Total prize fund: £5,200
- Winner's share: £2,000
- Highest break: Eddie Charlton (AUS) (97)

Final
- Champion: Ray Reardon (WAL)
- Runner-up: Graham Miles (ENG)
- Score: 7–3

The 1976 Masters (officially the 1976 Benson & Hedges Masters) was a professional snooker tournament that took place from 26 to 30 January 1976 at the New London Theatre in London, England. It was the second edition of The Masters and was organised and sponsored by the cigarette brand Benson & Hedges with the sanction of the World Professional Billiards and Snooker Association.

John Spencer was the defending champion, having defeated Ray Reardon 9–8 on a re-spotted black in the 1975 final. Reardon won the 1976 event, defeating Graham Miles 7–3 in the final. Aged 43 years and three months at the time of his win, Reardon remained the oldest winner of the event until Stuart Bingham won the title in 2020.

The highest break of the tournament was 97 by Eddie Charlton.

== Overview ==
The 1976 Masters was staged at the New London Theatre in Drury Lane, London, with ten invited players and was the second edition of the Masters after its establishment in 1975. It was organised by representatives of the sponsors, cigarette brand Benson & Hedges, and sanctioned by the World Professional Billiards and Snooker Association.

John Spencer was the defending champion, having defeated Ray Reardon 9–8 on a re-spotted black in the 1975 final. The 1975 tournament had been held at the West Centre Hotel in Fulham and had not been successful, with relatively high ticket prices, difficult playing conditions caused by the snooker table cloth drying out because of the television lighting, and the tournament being located out of the centre of town.. Fred Davis commented that the New London Theatre was "just the sort of prestigious venue at which snooker should be presented, particularly in London."

Reardon was the bookmakers' pre-tournament favourite to win, with odds of 6/4. The second-favourite was Spencer at 7/4, followed by both Alex Higgins and Eddie Charlton at 6/1. Highlights were broadcast as part of Grandstand on BBC1, with commentary by Ted Lowe.

=== Prize fund ===
The winner of the event received £2,000 from a total prize fund of £5,200. The breakdown of prize money is shown below:

- Winner: £2,000
- Runner-up: £1,000
- Semi-finals: £500
- Quarter-finals: £250
- First round: £100
- Total: £5,200

== Summary ==
=== First round ===
First round matches were played on 26 and 27 January as the best-of-seven frames. Fred Davis made a break of 71 to win the opening frame against Cliff Thorburn but lost the second frame on a re-spotted black after having led by 46 points to 0. Davis won frame three, and added frame four when he fluked the final black ball. A break of 54 by Thorburn saw him win frame five, but Davis won the sixth frame on the final pink to prevail 4–2.

The highest break of the match between John Pulman and Dennis Taylor was a 33 by Pulman in the second frame. Pulman had won the first frame but lost the second frame on the final black. Pulman won the third frame, and added the fourth on the final black after Taylor had made a break of 32. Taylor had a break of 30 and won frame five, then Pulman, also with a break of 30, sealed the match at 4–2 in the next frame.

=== Quarter-finals ===
The quarter-finals were played from 26 to 28 January as the best-of-nine frames. Davis led John Spencer by 40 points to 0 in frame one and by 35 to 0 in frame two, but lost both frames. Spencer went on to complete a whitewash, with breaks of 77 in frame three and 60 in frame four. Graham Miles won the first three frames against Alex Higgins with what Snooker Scene magazine described as "cue ball control of the highest quality." Miles produced an 86 break in the third frame and followed it with a 56 in frame four. Higgins had an opportunity to win the third frame, but missed when attempting to pot the yellow ball. Higgins did take the fourth frame, but Miles won the match 4–1.

Eddie Charlton faced Rex Williams, who was the reigning world billiards champion, having successfully seen off Charlton's challenge for that title in September 1974. Charlton made a break of 97 in the first frame, which turned out to be the highest of the tournament. After Charlton had compiled a break of 38 in frame two, Williams responded with a break of 21 that ended when he accidentally jumped the cue ball over the black during a break. Charlton won that frame, and added frame three, which he won by doubling the final black. A break of 48 helped Williams win the fourth frame, but Charlton secured a win at 4–1 after making a break of 55 in frame five.

Ray Reardon defeated Pulman 4–1 in what Snooker Scene magazine described as "a match for connoisseurs of the ghastly." Reardon later described it as "a dreadful match." Both players made a number of mistakes, and the highest break of the match was a 22 by Pulman. At the end of frame four, Pulman missed the final black, which would have put him level at 2–2. Reardon potted the black to win the frame and then won frame five for what Snooker Scene called "one of the most undistinguished wins of his career." Tickets for the match were priced at £1.50 but ticket touts had been reselling them for up to £12.50.

=== Semi-finals ===
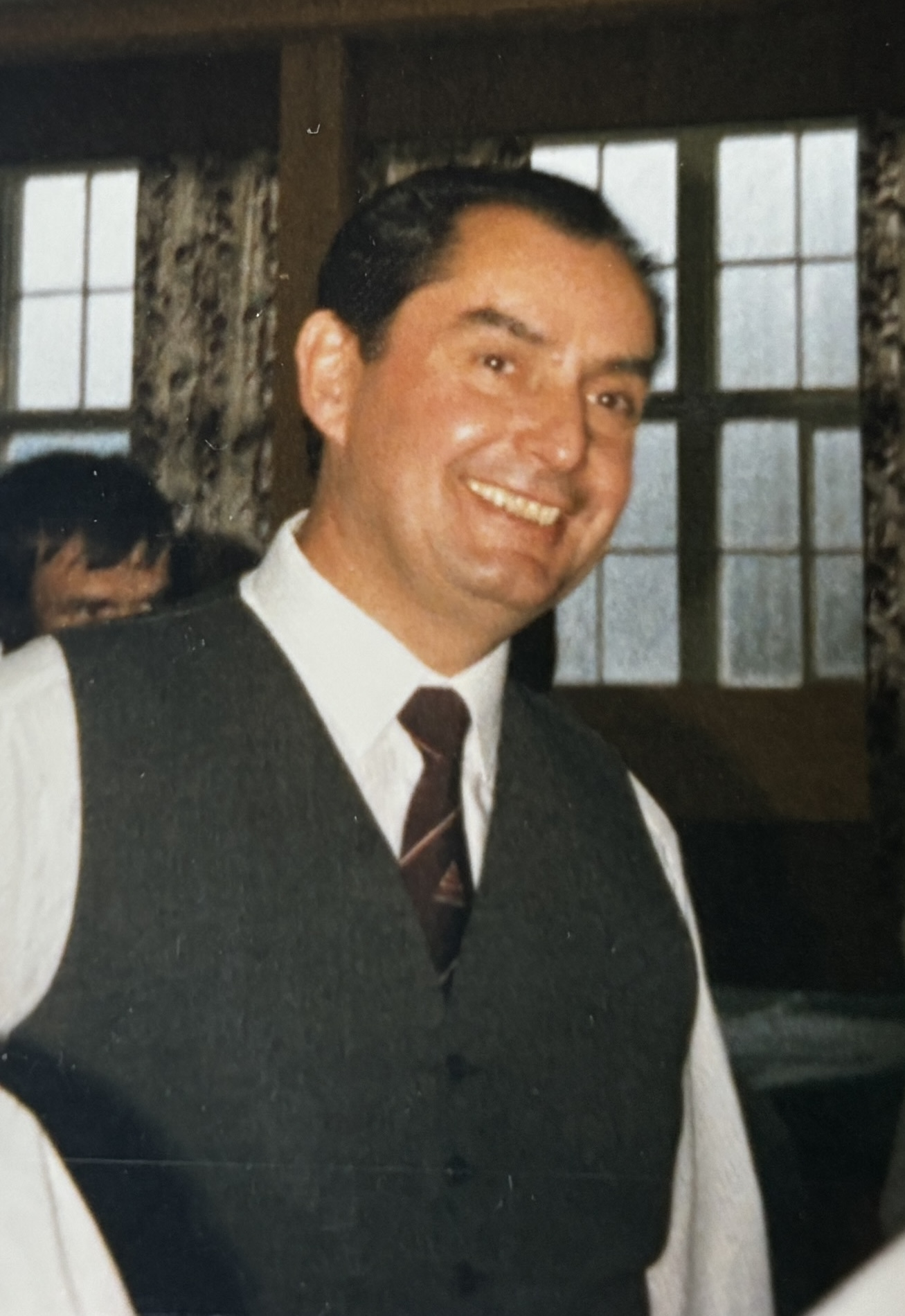
Ray Reardon (pictured circa 1983) won the title.

The semi-finals were held on 29 January as the best-of-nine frames. Both matches went to a deciding frame. Miles won the first frame against Spencer, capitalising after Spencer had missed an attempt at a long pot on a green ball. Spencer won the next two frames comfortably, and made breaks of 44 and 45 in frame three. He led Miles in frame four, but Miles made a break of 42, and twice snookered him. Miles won the frame on the green ball. Spencer fluked the re-spotted black to win frame five. Miles levelled the match at 3–3, and again at 4–4 after Spencer had won frame seven with a break of 74. Miles won the deciding frame 61–9.

Charlton, despite not missing any straightforward pots, lost the first three frames to Reardon, who recorded a 65 break in the first frame. A 52 break earnt Charlton the fourth frame, to which he added the next frame, and then frame 6 by 110 points to 0. Reardon took the lead again with a 43 break in frame seven. In the eighth frame, Charlton went in-off the penultimate red ball and again off the last red ball. Reardon cleared to the pink, but failed to pot it; Charlton did pot it, to level again at 4–4. Charlton led by 28 points to 0 in the deciding frame, but was later 33–44 behind after a 35 break by Reardon. Reardon failed to pot the final red ball, but fluked a snooker, and after Charlton played and left the last red pottable, Reardon completed a clearance to win 5–4.

=== Final ===
The final between Reardon and Miles was played on 30 January as the best-of-13 frames across two sessions. Gus Lillygreen was the referee. The match was sold out, and tickets exchanged hands for as much as £50, against a face value of £2. Reardon took the first three frames, with breaks of 40, 46 and 57; Miles conceded the third frame at 1–63 with two reds remaining. A break of 32 contributed to Miles winning frame four. Reardon re-established a three-frame lead with a break of 70 in the fifth frame; the break ended when he went in-off the final brown ball. Reardon added the sixth frame, then Miles won the final frame of the first session, coming from behind with a break of 34.

Reardon compiled a clearance of 90 in the first frame of the second session. Miles made it 3–6 with breaks of 24 and 39 in frame nine, but Reardon won frame ten, including a 35 break, to claim victory at 7–3. He said afterwards that "I began the tournament out of form because I had not handled a cue for four days. I really can't see anyone around who can beat me for my world title in April." Miles commented that "Ray was terrific. He left nothing for me." The match report in Snooker Scene magazine commented that "A capacity crowd, a magnificent arena and a sense of occasion always seems to inspire Reardon's best". The report also said that Miles had "emerged as a fully fledged member of the very top group of players after spending quite a few years on the immediate fringe." Reardon was 43 years and three months old when he won, and remained the oldest player to win the Masters until Stuart Bingham captured the 2020 edition at 43 years and eight months old.

The Snooker Scene editorial also stated that the event was free from the issues that had adversely affected the inaugural event, and was "thoroughly well presented" and a suitable showcase for the sport in London, "attracting as it did not only the hardcore enthusiasts but a more general public". Clive Everton wrote in 2012 that "There was a new sense of prestige and occasion to which the public responded." All 1,500 tickets were sold for the final and semi-finals, and some of the other matches attracted near-capacity audiences.

== Tournament draw ==
The draw of the tournament is shown below. The match winners are shown in bold.

**First round** Best of 7 frames
**Fred Davis (ENG)**	**4**
Cliff Thorburn (CAN)	2
**John Pulman (ENG)**	**4**
Dennis Taylor (NIR)	2

**Quarter-finals**; Best of 7 frames
**John Spencer (ENG)**	**4**
Fred Davis (ENG)	0
Alex Higgins (NIR)	1
**Graham Miles (ENG)**	**4**
Rex Williams (ENG)	1
**Eddie Charlton (AUS)**	**4**
**Ray Reardon (WAL)**	**4**
John Pulman (ENG)	1

**Semi-finals**; Best of 9 frames
John Spencer (ENG)	4
**Graham Miles (ENG)**	**5**
Eddie Charlton (AUS)	4
**Ray Reardon (WAL)**	**5**

**Final**; Best of 13 frames
Graham Miles (ENG)	3
**Ray Reardon (WAL)**	**7**

=== Final: details and frame scores ===
Final
Best of 13 frames. Referee: Gus Lillygreen; New London Theatre, London, England, 30 January 1976. Numbers in parentheses are breaks of 50 or more.
**Ray Reardon (WAL)**	**7**–3	Graham Miles (ENG)
First session: **79**–34, **88**–11, **63**–1 (57), 42–**68**, **73**–18 (70), **61**–22, 41–**95**; Second session: **104**–17 (90), 11–**85**, **57**–16
**90**	Highest break	39
**3**	50+ breaks	0
