= Ray Reardon =

Welsh professional snooker player (1932–2024)

Ray Reardon MBE
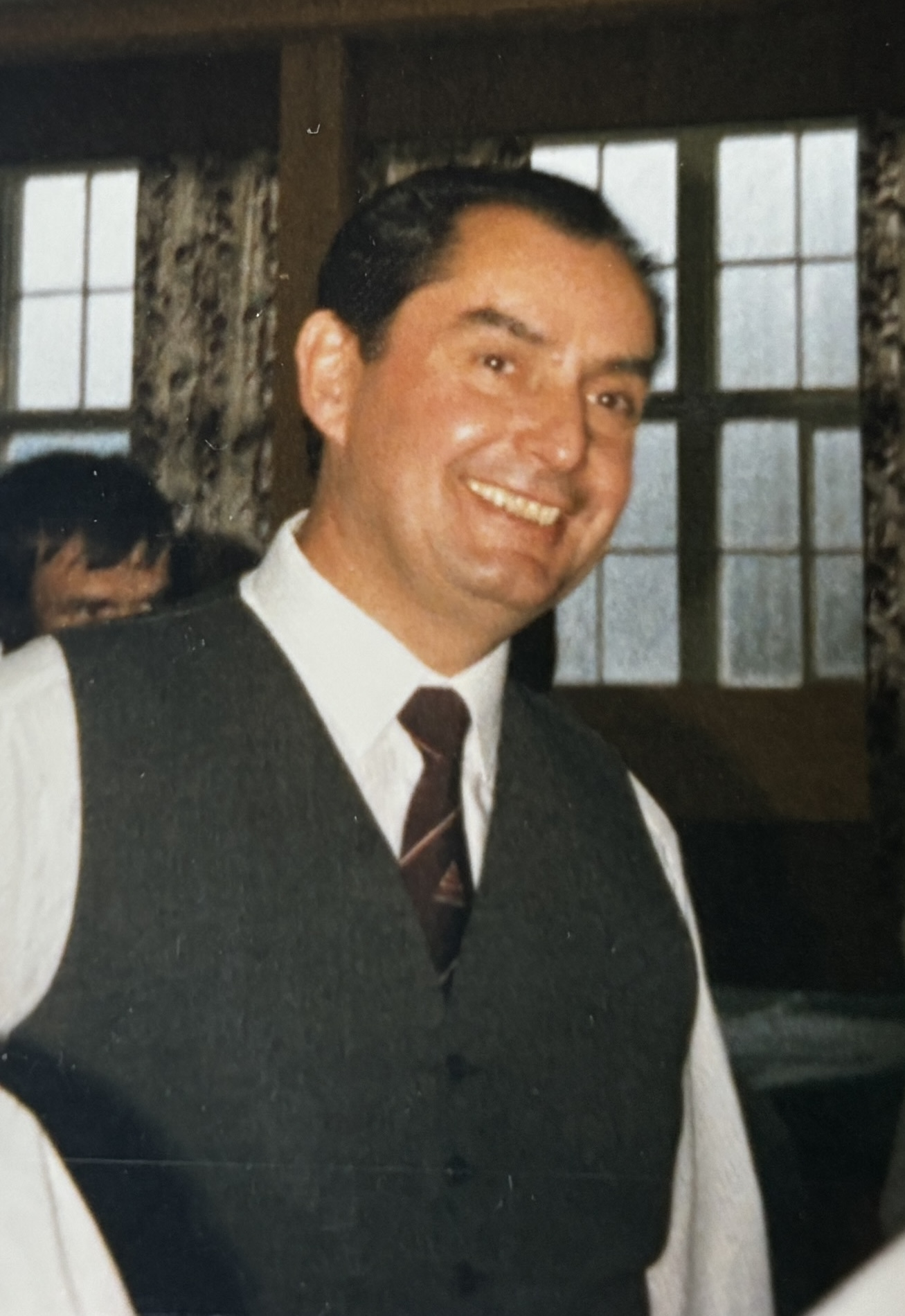
- Reardon circa 1983

Personal information
- Nickname: Dracula
- Born: 8 October 1932 Tredegar, Monmouthshire, Wales
- Died: 19 July 2024 (aged 91)

Sport
- Country: Wales
- Sport: Snooker
- Professional: 1967–1991
- Highest ranking: 1 (1976–1981, 1982–1983)

Tournament wins
- Ranking: 5
- World Championship: 1970; 1973; 1974; 1975; 1976; 1978

Raymond Reardon (8 October 1932 – 19 July 2024) was a Welsh professional snooker player who dominated the sport in the 1970s, winning the World Snooker Championship six times and claiming more than a dozen other professional titles. Due to his dark widow's peak and prominent eye teeth, he was nicknamed "Dracula".

Until his mid-thirties, Reardon worked as a coal miner and then as a police officer while pursuing snooker at an amateur level. His titles during this era included six consecutive Welsh Amateur Championships from 1950 to 1955 and the English Amateur Championship in 1964. He turned professional in 1967 and became World Champion in 1970, 1973, 1974, 1975, 1976, and 1978; he was also runner-up in 1982. His other major tournament wins included the inaugural Pot Black tournament in 1969, the 1976 Masters, and the 1982 Professional Players Tournament. The first player to be ranked "world number one" when world rankings were introduced during the 1976–77 season, he held the position for the next five years. He regained the top ranking position in 1982, after which his form declined; he dropped out of the elite top-16 ranked players after the 1986–87 season.

In 1978, Reardon became the oldest World Champion, aged 45 years and 203 days, a record he held for the next 44 years, until Ronnie O'Sullivan won his seventh world title at the 2022 event, aged 46 years and 148 days. Reardon became the oldest winner of a ranking title when he won the 1982 Professional Players Tournament aged 50 years and 14 days; his record endured for 43 years, until Mark Williams won the 2025 Xi'an Grand Prix at the age of 50 years and 206 days. Appointed a Member of the Order of the British Empire in 1985, Reardon retired from professional competition in 1991, aged 58. He never achieved a maximum break in tournament play; his highest break in competition was 146.

During his retirement, Reardon served as president of Churston Ferrers golf club in Devon, where he was a member for over 40 years. He mentored O'Sullivan in preparation for his 2004 World Championship campaign, helping him lift his second world title. In 2017, the Welsh Open trophy was renamed the Ray Reardon Trophy in his honour. Reardon died from cancer in July 2024, aged 91.

== Early life ==
The son of Ben and Cynthia Reardon, he was born on 8 October 1932 in the coal mining community of Tredegar in Monmouthshire, Wales. When eight years old, he was introduced to a version of snooker by his uncle, and at ten he was practising cue sports twice-weekly at Tredegar Workmen's Institute as well as on a scaled-down billiard table at home. He primarily played English billiards rather than snooker, which, according to authors Luke Williams and Paul Gadsby, helped improve his control of the cue ball and his potting. At the age of 14, following in the footsteps of his father, Reardon turned down a place at a grammar school to become a miner at Ty Trist Colliery. He wore white gloves while mining, to protect his hands for snooker. He made his first century break on his 17th birthday.

In March 1959, Reardon married Sue, a pottery painter. After a rockfall in which he was buried for three hours, and with Sue's encouragement, he quit mining and became a police officer in 1960 when his family moved to Stoke-on-Trent in Staffordshire, England. While serving in the police force, Reardon earned commendations for bravery. On one occasion, he disarmed a man who was wielding a shotgun. On another, he crawled across an icy rooftop and dropped through a skylight onto a burglar.

== Amateur snooker career ==
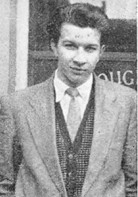
Cliff Wilson (pictured in 1955)

In 1949, Reardon won the News of the World Amateur title and was awarded an ash cue stick, presented to him by 15-time world snooker champion, Joe Davis. Reardon used this cue for almost 30 years until it came apart shortly after the 1978 World Championship final. He reached the final of the 1949–50 under-19 Junior championship, losing 2–3 to Jack Carney. Reardon first won the Welsh Amateur Championship in 1950, defeating the defending champion John Ford 5–3 in the final, and he retained the title every year until 1955. He reached the final of the 1956 English Amateur Championship, where he led Tommy Gordon 7–3 after the first day, but lost the tip from his cue early on the second day and was defeated 9–11.

Reardon played a fellow Tredegar resident, Cliff Wilson, in a succession of money matches and faced him several times in amateur tournaments. Their contests attracted hundreds of spectators and in his 1979 book, The Story of Billiards and Snooker, Clive Everton describes them as "modern snooker's nearest equivalent to a bare knuckle prize fight."

After losing in the first round of the 1957 English Amateur Championship, Reardon decided to take some time out from competitive snooker to work on improving his game. He next entered the championship in 1964, when he won the title by defeating John Spencer 11–8 in the final.

== Professional career ==
=== Six times world snooker champion ===
That victory in 1964 led to an invitation to tour South Africa with Jonathan Barron, which proved so successful that Reardon was offered the opportunity to return and tour again as a professional. He returned there after having resigned from the police force and turned professional in 1967. When he played Jimmy van Rensberg in the South African Challenge, Reardon won the best-of-three matches event 2–1.

Reardon's first appearance at the World Snooker Championship was in 1969 in a quarter-final against Fred Davis in Stoke-on-Trent. The match featured lengthy tactical exchanges between the players, resulting in some of the longest sessions ever recorded in World Championship play. Neither player was ahead by more than two frames until Reardon won the 27th frame to lead 15–12, after which Davis won six frames in a row. The best-of-49-frames match went to a deciding frame, which Davis won. In July 1969, the BBC began broadcasting Pot Black, a competition of one-frame matches which became popular with viewers and enhanced the profile and earning power of the participants. Reardon won the first series by defeating Spencer 88–29 in the one-frame final.

In London in April 1970, Reardon won the World Championship for the first time, defeating Davis in the quarter-finals, Spencer in the semi-finals, and John Pulman 37–33 in the final, having led 27–14 before Pulman reduced the lead to one frame at 34–33. At the next World Championship, played in Australia in November 1970, Reardon won all four of his round-robin group matches, and qualified for a place in the semi-finals, where Spencer established a winning margin against him at 25–7 and finished the match 34–15 ahead after dead frames. Reardon won the October 1971 edition of the Park Drive 2000, defeating Spencer 4–3 in the final after placing second in the round-robin stage (behind Spencer who had placed first). In the Spring 1972 edition, he made a break of 146 in the round-robin, which was the highest-ever break in competitive play at that time. This remained the highest official break of Reardon's career, as he never achieved a maximum break of 147 in tournament play.

At the 1972 World Championship, Reardon lost his first match 22–25 to Rex Williams in the quarter-finals. He reached the final of the 1973 World Championship in Manchester, beating Jim Meadowcroft 16–10, and Spencer 23–22. He lost the first seven frames of the final to Eddie Charlton, but took 17 of the next 23 to hold a four-frame advantage at 17–13 and then moved further ahead into a 27–25 lead. At this point in the match, he complained to the organisers about the television lighting reflecting on the object balls; when his complaint was not resolved by the organisers, he approached the tournament sponsors and threatened to withdraw from the competition, after which the lighting was changed. Reardon was ahead 31–29 going into the last day, and won 38–32 to claim his second world title.

Reardon defended his World Championship title in 1974, defeating Meadowcroft 15–3, Marcus Owen 15–11 and Davis 15–3 before beating Graham Miles 22–12 in the final. In a post-match interview, Reardon suggested that he had not played "any better than mediocre" in the final, but that Miles had not created any pressure for him, adding: "I don't feel the elation that I felt at winning last year." He also won the 1974 Pontins Professional, leading 9–4 in the final and winning it 10–9 after Spencer took five consecutive frames to force a decider.

In 1975, Reardon reached the final of the inaugural Masters by winning 5–4 on the pink ball against Williams in the semi-final, but lost the final 8–9 to Spencer on a re-spotted black. At the 1975 World Championship in Australia, he won a tough quarter-final against Spencer, 19–17, and then eliminated Alex Higgins 19–14 in the semi-finals to meet Charlton in the final. Reardon was leading 16–8, but Charlton won the following nine frames and then went ahead 28–23 before Reardon pulled back seven of the next eight frames to lead 30–29. Charlton took the 60th frame to tie the match but Reardon won the vital 61st frame to secure the world title for the third successive year. A week later, at Pontins in Prestatyn, Wales, he retained the Professional title and won the Spring Open title.

Reardon won the Masters in January 1976, beating Miles 7–3 in the final. He had earned his place in the final by defeating Pulman 4–1 in the quarter-finals, in a match where the highest break (compiled by Pulman) was only 22, and then Charlton 5–4 in the semi-finals.

In 1976, Reardon won his fifth world title, defeating John Dunning 15–7, Dennis Taylor 15–2 and Perrie Mans 20–10. During the final in Manchester against Higgins, Reardon complained about the television lighting (which was changed), the quality of the table (to which adjustments were subsequently made), and the referee (who was replaced). Higgins led in the early stages of the match, but Reardon recovered to 15–13 before winning 12 of the next 15 frames for a 27–16 victory. He claimed the Pontins Professional title for the third consecutive year, defeating Fred Davis 10–9 in a contest described by Snooker Scene's correspondent as the best match of the professional season for "quality, interest and excitement". Both players made a century break in the match, Reardon pulling ahead to 8–5 after losing all of the first three frames, but then needing the last two when Davis took the score to 9–8. Reardon also won the 1976 World Professional Match-play Championship in Australia, defeating the event's promoter Charlton 31–24 in the final.

Reardon reached the final of the 1977 Masters, beating Williams 4–1 in the quarter-finals and Miles 5–2 in the semi-finals, but lost the final 6–7 to Doug Mountjoy. He was also runner-up at the 1977 Benson & Hedges Ireland Tournament, losing 2–5 to Higgins. Reardon's successful run at the World Championship ended in 1977 at the Crucible Theatre in Sheffield, (Note: This was the first year that the World Championship was held at the Crucible.) when he lost to Spencer in the quarter-finals 6–13; it was his first defeat at the World Championship since his quarter-final loss to Williams in 1972.

Reardon regained the world title in 1978 in Sheffield; after recovering from 2–7 down to beat Mountjoy 13–9 in the last-16 round, he defeated Bill Werbeniuk 13–6, Charlton 18–14, and Mans 25–18 in the final to lift the trophy for the sixth and final time. Aged 45 years and 203 days, Reardon was the oldest winner of the World Snooker Championship, a record that lasted until 2022 when Ronnie O'Sullivan won the title aged 46 years and 148 days. Soon after establishing this record, Reardon regained the Pontins Professional title, taking it for the fourth time in five years, defeating Spencer 7–2 in the final. The same year, his old rival from Tredegar, Wilson, won the World Amateur Championship.

=== Later professional career ===
Toward the end of 1978, Reardon beat Patsy Fagan 6–1 and Higgins 11–9 to win the one-off "Champion of Champions" event, sponsored by the Daily Mirror and held at the Wembley Conference Centre. He also won the 1979 Forward Chemicals Tournament.

Reardon regained his Pot Black title in 1979 by defeating Mountjoy 2–1 in the final. This was Reardon's first win since he won the inaugural event in 1969, although he was runner-up in 1970, 1972 and 1980. At the 1979 World Championship, he lost to Dennis Taylor in the quarter-finals, and was eliminated by David Taylor at the same stage in 1980. He progressed one stage further in 1981, beating Spencer 13–11 and Werbeniuk 13–10 before being defeated by Mountjoy in the semi-finals. Mountjoy scored a championship record break of 145 during the match, which he won 16–10.

In 1979, Reardon joined with Mountjoy and the reigning World Champion, Terry Griffiths, to win the first World Challenge Cup for Wales, defeating England (Fred Davis, Spencer and Miles) in the final, 14–3. The same Wales team retained the title in 1980.

At the 1982 Highland Masters, Reardon eliminated Steve Davis in the semi-finals before winning the event by defeating Spencer 11–4 in the final.He reached the final of the 1982 World Championship, losing to Higgins 15–18. En route to the final, he defeated Jim Donnelly 10–5, John Virgo 13–8, Silvino Francisco 13–8, and Charlton, in the semi-finals, by 16–11 after winning five successive frames from 11-all. In the final, Reardon built a 5–3 lead, but was behind 7–10 at the end of the first day. He later levelled the match at 15–15, but Higgins won the last three frames to claim the title.

For the 1982–83 season, Reardon returned to number one in the world rankings, which at the time was only based on performances at the World Championships over previous years. He won the Professional Players Tournament in October 1982, beating Jimmy White 10–5 in the final, reached the final of the Benson & Hedges Masters, losing 7–9 to Cliff Thorburn, and won the 1983 International Masters, where he defeated Davis 2–1 in the semi-final group stages, before prevailing 9–6 against White in the final, having trailed 3–5. At the Professional Players Tournament, Reardon set a record as the oldest winner of a ranking tournament at the age of 50 years and 14 days; this record stood for 43 years, until Mark Williams won the 2025 Xi'an Grand Prix at the age of 50 years and 206 days. He also regained the Welsh Professional Title, eliminating Griffiths 9–4 and Mountjoy 9–1 in the semi-final and final respectively. At the 1983 World Championship, he lost 12–13 in the second round to Tony Knowles; he reached the quarter-finals in 1984 but was eliminated 2–13 by Kirk Stevens.

Reardon first wore spectacles in a match at the 1985 British Open, which he lost 4–5 to Dave Martin after leading 4–1. He reached the semi-finals of the 1985 World Championship (playing with unassisted vision), where he lost 5–16 to Davis. He lost to John Campbell in the first round of the 1986 World Championship, and to Davis in the second round in 1987.

After dropping out of the top-16 rankings in 1987, Reardon whitewashed Davis 5–0 in the third round of the 1988 British Open, using his old cue (encouraged to rebuild it by Davis) with which he had won his world titles. In the next round, playing under TV lighting, he suffered a drying of contact lenses (which he started using in 1987) and lost 2–5 to David Roe, having led 2–1.

In 1985, Reardon left his wife Sue, with whom he had two children, to live with Carol Covington. He told reporters from the Daily Mirror that Sue had been "fully informed" of his eight-year affair with Covington. The Reardons divorced in December 1986, and Reardon married Covington in June 1987.

== Retirement, death and legacy ==
Reardon played his last competitive ranking match in the second round of qualifying for the 1991 World Championship, where he was defeated 5–10 by Jason Prince, losing three frames on the final black. Afterwards, Reardon said that he felt "no bitterness" but that he would not be returning. Aged 58 and having slipped to 127th in the provisional rankings, Reardon halted his playing career, mentioning that he had not entered any tournaments for the following season because the qualifying event dates clashed with his exhibition commitments on the holiday camp circuit, but adding that "even if it were feasible, [he] wouldn't play" except in invitation or seniors events. He later played in the 2000 World Seniors Masters where he lost his opening one-frame match 46–69 to Miles. He advised Ronnie O'Sullivan on the way to his 2004 World Championship victory, giving him psychological and tactical help.

When the snooker world rankings were introduced in 1976, Reardon was the first to claim the position of world number one, retaining it until 1981. His win in the 1982 Professional Players Tournament at 50 contributed to his recapturing the world number one position in the first set of rankings to be calculated on tournaments other than the World Championship. Reardon and Spencer were the first players to exploit the commercial opportunities made available by the increasing interest in snooker in the early 1970s. After winning Pot Black in 1969 and the world title in 1970, Reardon took up offers for exhibition matches and holiday camp exhibition engagements. Everton and Gordon Burn (1986) have both noted that his peak as a player pre-dated the real boom in snooker that happened in the 1980s.

In January 1976, Reardon was the subject of an episode of the British TV show, This is Your Life, the guests including Spencer, Charlton, Higgins, Pulman, Miles, Thorburn, Jackie Rea and Joyce Gardner. Later that year, he was a guest on The David Nixon Show, and in 1979 he was a guest on Parkinson, A Question of Sport, and The Paul Daniels Magic Show. His later guest appearances included Punchlines (1981), Saturday Superstore (1984), The Rod and Emu Show (1984), Sorry! (1985), and The Little and Large Show (1987). He appeared on the snooker-themed game show Big Break several times. Ian Wooldridge wrote and presented a Ray Reardon special on BBC2 in 1984, and the same channel broadcast Ray Reardon at 80 in 2012. Reardon was a castaway on BBC Radio 4's Desert Island Discs in 1979, and chose a set of golf clubs and balls as his luxury item.

His prominent eye teeth and widow's peak led to him being nicknamed "Dracula"; the sobriquet was first used by Paul Daniels after Reardon appeared on one of his television shows. Everton has described Reardon in his early career as a "deadly long potter", and praised his "nerve with which he identifies and seizes frame winning openings." Jack Karnehm wrote that Reardon achieved "complete and utter dominance of the game" by 1976, and "had a determination and will to win unequalled since the heyday of Joe Davis." Williams and Gadsby described Reardon as "without doubt the most successful snooker player of the 1970s", and claimed "he set new standards for mental fortitude" in the game.

After seeing Reardon play at Pontins in 1975, Steve Davis incorporated elements that he had observed in Reardon's game into his own, including a pause before hitting the cue ball, and his "approach" to the shot. Burn wrote "Ray Reardon behaved as if he thought he was special. And Steve—with a little encouragement from [his manager] Barry [Hearn]—decided that was how he was going to behave from now on." Davis admitted that he had lost some respect for Reardon when, as a new professional, he experienced Reardon asking for the pack of red balls to be re-racked six times, claiming that the referee had not placed them correctly. Unsettled by what he felt was gamesmanship on Reardon's part, Davis had lost the match 0–4. Spencer stated in his autobiography that he was never friendly with Reardon, and suggested that he was "the sort of person who could laugh 24 hours a day if it was to his advantage".

Reardon was appointed a Member of the Order of the British Empire (MBE) in the 1985 Birthday Honours for services to snooker. He resided in Devon, and was the president of the golf club in Churston, a position that he had held since 2001, having been a member since the 1970s. He made a playing appearance at a Snooker Legends evening in Plymouth in July 2010. The Welsh Open trophy was renamed the Ray Reardon Trophy in his honour, starting with the 2017 edition of the tournament.

Reardon died of cancer on 19 July 2024, at the age of 91. Three-time world champion Mark Williams led tributes to his fellow Welshman, describing Reardon as "one of the best sportspeople ever from Wales and the best snooker player."

== Performance and rankings timeline ==
Tournament	1968/ 69	1969/ 70	1970/ 71	1971/ 72	1972/ 73	1973/ 74	1974/ 75	1975/ 76	1976/ 77	1977/ 78	1978/ 79	1979/ 80	1980/ 81	1981/ 82	1982/ 83	1983/ 84	1984/ 85	1985/ 86	1986/ 87	1987/ 88	1988/ 89	1989/ 90	1990/ 91	Ref.
Ranking	No ranking system								1	1	1	1	1	4	1	2	5	6	15	38	40	54	74	
Ranking tournaments
Grand Prix (Note: The event was also called the Professional Players Tournament (1982/1983–1983/1984).)	Tournament Not Held														W	3R	3R	1R	1R	1R	LQ	A	LQ	
Asian Open (Note: The event was also called the Thailand Masters (1983/1984–1986/1987 & 1991/1992) and the Asian Open (1989/1990–1992/1993).)	Tournament Not Held															Non-Ranking Event				Not Held		A	LQ	
Dubai Classic (Note: The event was also called the Dubai Masters (1988/1989).)	Tournament Not Held																				NR	A	LQ	
UK Championship	Tournament Not Held									Non-Ranking Event							QF	2R	2R	1R	1R	LQ	LQ	
Classic	Tournament Not Held											Non-Ranking Event				1R	QF	1R	1R	1R	2R	LQ	A	
British Open (Note: The event was also called the British Gold Cup (1979/1980), Yamaha Organs Trophy (1980/1981) and International Masters (1981/1982–1983/1984).)	Tournament Not Held											Non-Ranking Event					2R	1R	2R	2R	1R	LQ	A	
European Open	Tournament Not Held																				1R	A	LQ	
World Championship	Non-Ranking Event					W	W	W	QF	W	QF	QF	SF	F	2R	QF	SF	1R	2R	LQ	LQ	LQ	LQ	
Non-ranking tournaments
Scottish Masters	Tournament Not Held													QF	QF	A	A	A	A	A	NH	A	A	
European Grand Masters	Tournament Not Held																						F	
The Masters	Tournament Not Held						F	W	F	SF	SF	SF	QF	QF	F	QF	QF	1R	1R	A	A	A	A	
Irish Masters (Note: The event was also called the Benson & Hedges Ireland Tournament (1974/1975–1976/1977).)	Tournament Not Held						A	A	F	SF	F	RR	F	SF	F	QF	1R	1R	A	A	A	A	A	
Welsh Professional Championship	Tournament Not Held									W	NH	F	W	SF	W	SF	SF	QF	QF	QF	QF	QF	QF	
Professional Snooker League (Note: The event was later called the Premier League.)	Tournament Not Held															RR	Not Held		A	A	A	A	A	
Pontins Professional	Tournament Not Held					W	W	W	RR	W	SF	F	QF	F	F	SF	SF	QF	A	A	A	A	A	
Former ranking tournaments
Canadian Masters (Note: The event was also called the Canadian Open (1978/1979–1980/1981).)	Tournament Not Held						Non-Ranking							Tournament Not Held				Non-Ranking			1R	Not Held		
International Open (Note: The event was also called the Goya Matchroom Trophy (1985/1986).)	Tournament Not Held													NR	2R	2R	2R	1R	2R	1R	1R	A	NH	
Former non-ranking tournaments
Stratford Professional	Not Held		F	A	A	Tournament Not Held																		
Park Drive 2000 (Spring)	Not Held		A	RR	Tournament Not Held																			
Park Drive 2000 (Autumn)	Not Held			W	RR	Tournament Not Held																		
Men of the Midlands	Not Held			SF	F	Tournament Not Held																		
World Championship	QF	W	SF	QF	W	Ranking Event																		
World Masters	Tournament Not Held						RR	Tournament Not Held																
Norwich Union Open	Tournament Not Held					A	F	Tournament Not Held																
Watney Open	Tournament Not Held						SF	Tournament Not Held																
Canadian Club Masters	Tournament Not Held							F	Tournament Not Held															
World Matchplay Championship	Tournament Not Held								F	Tournament Not Held														
Dry Blackthorn Cup	Tournament Not Held									SF	Tournament Not Held													
Holsten Lager International	Tournament Not Held										QF	Tournament Not Held												
Forward Chemicals Tournament	Tournament Not Held										W	Tournament Not Held												
Golden Masters	Tournament Not Held									F	W	Tournament Not Held												
Kronenbrau 1308 Classic	Tournament Not Held											F	Tournament Not Held											
Champion of Champions	Tournament Not Held										W	NH	RR	Tournament Not Held										
International Open	Tournament Not Held													2R	Ranking Event								NH	
Highland Masters	Tournament Not Held													W	Tournament Not Held									
Classic	Tournament Not Held											A	SF	SF	1R	Ranking Event								
Tolly Cobbold Classic	Tournament Not Held										F	A	A	A	QF	A	Tournament Not Held							
UK Championship	Tournament Not Held									2R	2R	A	SF	QF	SF	QF	Ranking Event							
British Open	Tournament Not Held											F	RR	RR	W	2R	Ranking Event							
KitKat Break for World Champions	Tournament Not Held																	QF	Tournament Not Held					
Belgian Classic	Tournament Not Held																	QF	Tournament Not Held					
Canadian Masters	Tournament Not Held						A	A	A	SF	A	A	A	Tournament Not Held				SF	A	A	R	Not Held		

Performance Table Legend
LQ	lost in the qualifying draw	#R	lost in the early rounds of the tournament (WR = Wildcard round, RR = Round robin)	QF	lost in the quarter-finals
SF	lost in the semi-finals	F	lost in the final	W	won the tournament
DNQ	did not qualify for the tournament	A	did not participate in the tournament	??	no reliable source available

NH / Not Held	means an event was not held.
NR / Non-Ranking Event	means an event is/was no longer a ranking event.
R / Ranking Event	means an event is/was a ranking event.

== Career finals ==
Sources for the ranking and non-ranking final results can be found in the Performance timeline section above.

=== Ranking finals: 6 (5 titles) ===
Legend
World Championship (4–1)
Other (1–0)

Ranking tournament finals
Outcome	No.	Year	Championship	Opponent in the final	Score
Winner	1.	1974	World Championship (3)	Graham Miles (ENG)	22–12
Winner	2.	1975	World Championship (4)	Eddie Charlton (AUS)	31–30
Winner	3.	1976	World Championship (5)	Alex Higgins (NIR)	27–16
Winner	4.	1978	World Championship (6)	Perrie Mans (SAF)	25–18
Runner-up	1.	1982	World Championship	Alex Higgins (NIR)	15–18
Winner	5.	1982	Professional Players Tournament	Jimmy White (ENG)	10–5

=== Non-ranking finals: 47 (22 titles) ===
Legend
World Championship (2–0) (Note: The World Professional Billiards and Snooker Association implemented the ranking system following the 1976 World Snooker Championship. In the initial list, points were awarded based on performances in the 1974, 1975 and 1976 World Championships.)
The Masters (1–3)
Other (19–22)

Outcome	No.	Year	Championship	Opponent in the final	Score
Winner	1.	1967	South African Challenge	Jimmy van Rensberg (ZAF)	2–1 (Note: matches)
Winner	2.	1969	Pot Black	John Spencer (ENG)	1–0
Runner-up	1.	1970	Pot Black	John Spencer (ENG)	0–1
Winner	3.	1970	World Championship	John Pulman (ENG)	37–33
Runner-up	2.	1970	Stratford Professional	Gary Owen (WAL)	4–6
Winner	4.	1971	Park Drive 600	John Spencer (ENG)	4–0
Winner	5.	1971	Park Drive 2000 – Autumn	John Spencer (ENG)	4–3
Runner-up	3.	1972	Pot Black (2)	Eddie Charlton (AUS)	0–1
Winner	6.	1972	Ryde Tournament	Alex Higgins (NIR)	4–1
Runner-up	4.	1973	Men of the Midlands	Alex Higgins (NIR)	3–5
Winner	7.	1973	World Championship (2)	Eddie Charlton (AUS)	38–32
Winner	8.	1973	Castle Professional – Event 3	John Pulman (ENG)	Round–Robin
Winner	9.	1974	Pontins Professional	John Spencer (ENG)	10–9
Runner-up	5.	1974	Norwich Union Open	John Spencer (ENG)	9–10
Runner-up	6.	1975	The Masters	John Spencer (ENG)	8–9
Winner	10.	1975	Pontins Professional (2)	John Spencer (ENG)	10–4
Winner	11.	1976	The Masters	Graham Miles (ENG)	7–3
Winner	12.	1976	Pontins Professional (3)	Fred Davis (ENG)	10–9
Runner-up	7.	1976	Canadian Club Masters	Alex Higgins (NIR)	4–6
Runner-up	8.	1976	World Professional Match-play Championship	Eddie Charlton (AUS)	24–31
Runner-up	9.	1977	The Masters (2)	Doug Mountjoy (WAL)	6–7
Winner	13.	1977	Welsh Professional Championship	Doug Mountjoy (WAL)	12–8
Runner-up	10.	1977	Benson & Hedges Ireland Tournament	Alex Higgins (NIR)	3–5
Winner	14.	1978	Pontins Professional (4)	John Spencer (ENG)	7–2
Runner-up	11.	1978	Golden Masters	Doug Mountjoy (WAL)	2–4
Winner	15.	1978	Champion of Champions	Alex Higgins (NIR)	11–9
Winner	16.	1978	Pot Black (2)	Doug Mountjoy (WAL)	2–1
Winner	17.	1979	Forward Chemicals Tournament	John Spencer (ENG)	9–6
Runner-up	12.	1979	Irish Masters	Doug Mountjoy (WAL)	5–6
Runner-up	13.	1979	Tolly Cobbold Classic	Alex Higgins (NIR)	4–5
Winner	18.	1979	Golden Masters	Graham Miles (ENG)	4–2
Runner-up	14.	1979	Kronenbrau 1308 Classic	Eddie Charlton (AUS)	4–7
Runner-up	15.	1980	Pot Black (3)	Eddie Charlton (AUS)	1–2
Runner-up	16.	1980	Welsh Professional Championship	Doug Mountjoy (WAL)	6–9
Runner-up	17.	1980	British Gold Cup	Alex Higgins (NIR)	1–5
Runner-up	18.	1980	Pontins Professional	John Virgo (ENG)	6–9
Winner	19.	1981	Welsh Professional Championship (2)	Cliff Wilson (WAL)	9–6
Runner-up	19.	1981	Irish Masters (2)	Terry Griffiths (WAL)	7–9
Winner	20.	1982	Highland Masters	John Spencer (ENG)	11–4
Runner-up	20.	1982	Pontins Professional (2)	Steve Davis (ENG)	4–9
Runner-up	21.	1983	Pot Black (4)	Steve Davis (ENG)	0–2
Runner-up	22.	1983	The Masters (3)	Cliff Thorburn (CAN)	7–9
Winner	21.	1983	Welsh Professional Championship (3)	Doug Mountjoy (WAL)	9–1
Winner	22.	1983	International Masters	Jimmy White (ENG)	9–6
Runner-up	23.	1983	Irish Masters (3)	Steve Davis (ENG)	2–9
Runner-up	24.	1983	Pontins Professional (3)	Doug Mountjoy (WAL)	7–9
Runner-up	25.	1990	European Grand Masters	Martin Clark (ENG)	2–4

=== Team finals: 6 (3 titles) ===
Outcome	No.	Year	Championship	Team/partner	Opponent(s) in the final	Score	Ref.
Winner	1.	1975	Ladbroke International	Rest of the World (Note: "Rest of the World" team: Reardon, Cliff Thorburn (Canada), Eddie Charlton (Australia), Alex Higgins and Jackie Rea (both Northern Ireland))	England (Note: England team: Rex Williams, Fred Davis, Graham Miles, John Spencer, John Pulman)	Cumulative score	
Winner	2.	1979	World Challenge Cup	Wales (Note: Wales team: Reardon, Terry Griffiths, Doug Mountjoy)	England (Note: England team: John Spencer, Fred Davis, Graham Miles)	14–3	
Winner	3.	1980	World Challenge Cup (2)	Wales (Note: Wales team: Reardon, Terry Griffiths, Doug Mountjoy)	Canada (Note: Canada team: Cliff Thorburn, Bill Werbeniuk, Kirk Stevens)	8–5	
Runner-up	1.	1981	World Team Classic	Wales (Note: Wales team: Reardon, Terry Griffiths, Doug Mountjoy)	England (Note: England team: Steve Davis, John Spencer, David Taylor)	3–4	
Runner-up	2.	1983	World Team Classic (2)	Wales (Note: Wales team: Reardon, Terry Griffiths, Doug Mountjoy)	England (Note: England team: Steve Davis, Tony Knowles, Tony Meo)	2–4	
Runner-up	3.	1985	World Doubles Championship	Tony Jones (ENG)	Steve Davis (ENG), Tony Meo (ENG)	5–12	

=== Pro-am finals: 4 (2 titles) ===
Outcome	No.	Year	Championship	Opponent in the final	Score	Ref.
Winner	1.	1975	Pontins Spring Open	John Virgo (ENG)	7–1	
Winner	2.	1980	Union Billiards Classic	Perrie Mans (RSA)	6–4	
Runner-up	1.	1982	Pontins Spring Open	John Parrott (ENG)	4–7	
Runner-up	2.	1983	Pontins Spring Open (2)	Terry Griffiths (WAL)	3–7	

=== Amateur finals: 8 (7 titles) ===
Outcome	No.	Year	Championship	Opponent in the final	Score	Ref.
Winner	1.	1950	Welsh Amateur Championship	John Ford (WAL)	5–3	
Winner	2.	1951	Welsh Amateur Championship (2)	Richie Smith (WAL)	5–2	
Winner	3.	1952	Welsh Amateur Championship (3)	John Ford (WAL)	5–3	
Winner	4.	1953	Welsh Amateur Championship (4)	Aubrey Kemp (WAL)	5–3	
Winner	5.	1954	Welsh Amateur Championship (5)	John Ford (WAL)	unknown	
Winner	6.	1955	Welsh Amateur Championship (6)	John Ford (WAL)	5–2	
Runner-up	1.	1956	English Amateur Championship	Tommy Gordon (ENG)	9–11	
Winner	7.	1964	English Amateur Championship	John Spencer (ENG)	11–8	

== Publications ==
- Reardon, Ray (1976). Classic Snooker. Newton Abbot: David & Charles. ISBN 978-0-340-23112-8. OCLC 16431293.
- Reardon, Ray (1980). Ray Reardon's 50 Best Trick Shots. Newton Abbot: David & Charles. ISBN 978-0-7153-7993-6. OCLC 9431755.
- Reardon, Ray; Buxton, Peter (1982). Ray Reardon. Newton Abbot: David & Charles. ISBN 978-0-7153-8262-2. OCLC 16539704.
- Reardon, Ray (1983). Bedside Snooker. Newton Abbot: Century. ISBN 978-0-00-636845-8. OCLC 12507221.
- Reardon, Ray; Hennessey, John (1985). Enjoying Snooker with Ray Reardon: A Personal Guide to the Game. London: Orbis. ISBN 978-0-85613-909-3. OCLC 60071113.

== Bibliography ==
- Burn, Gordon (2008) [1986]. Pocket Money. London: Faber & Faber. ISBN 978-0-571-23683-1.
- Davis, Steve (2015). Interesting: My Autobiography. London: Ebury. ISBN 978-0-09-195864-0.
- Everton, Clive; Silverton, John (1972). Park Drive Official Snooker and Billiards Year Book. London: Gallagher Ltd. OCLC 498112105.
- Everton, Clive (1976). The Ladbroke Snooker International Handbook. Birmingham: Ladbrokes Leisure. ISBN 978-0-905606-00-2.
- Everton, Clive (1979). The Story of Billiards and Snooker. London: Cassell. ISBN 978-0-304-30373-1.
- Everton, Clive (1981). The Guinness Book of Snooker. Enfield: Guinness Superlatives. ISBN 978-0-85112-230-4.
- Everton, Clive, ed. (1984). Benson and Hedges Snooker Year (First ed.). London: Virgin Books. ISBN 978-0-86369-051-8.
- Everton, Clive (1985). Snooker: The Records. Enfield: Guinness Superlatives. ISBN 978-0-85112-448-3.
- Everton, Clive (1986). The History of Snooker and Billiards. Haywards Heath: Partridge Press. ISBN 978-1-85225-013-3.
- Hale, Janice (1987). Rothmans Snooker Yearbook 1987–88. Aylesbury: Queen Anne Press. ISBN 978-0-356-14690-4.
- Hayton, Eric; Dee, John (2004). The CueSport Book of Professional Snooker: The Complete Record & History. Lowestoft: Rose Villa Publications. ISBN 978-0-9548549-0-4.
- Karnehm, Jack (1982). World Snooker No. 2. London: Pelham. ISBN 978-0-7207-1398-5.
- Morrison, Ian (1987). The Hamlyn Encyclopedia of Snooker (Revised ed.). Twickenham: Hamlyn Publishing Group. ISBN 978-0-600-55604-6.
- Morrison, Ian (1988). Hamlyn Who's Who in Snooker. London: Hamlyn. ISBN 978-0-600-55713-5.
- Morrison, Ian (1989). Snooker: Records, Facts and Champions. Enfield: Guinness Superlatives Ltd. ISBN 978-0-85112-364-6.
- Perrin, Reg (1983). Pot Black. London: BBC Books. ISBN 978-0-563-20132-8.
- Spencer, John (2006). Out of the Blue – Into the Black: The Autobiography of John Spencer. Manchester: Parrs Wood Press. ISBN 978-1-903158-63-0.
- Williams, Luke; Gadsby, Paul (2005). Masters of the Baize. Edinburgh: Mainstream. ISBN 978-1-84018-872-1.
