= 1979–80 snooker season =

Details
- Duration: 9 July 1979 – 17 May 1980
- Tournaments: 22 (1 ranking event)

Triple Crown winners
- UK Championship: (England) John Virgo
- Masters: (Wales) Terry Griffiths
- World Championship: (Canada) Cliff Thorburn

The 1979–80 snooker season was a series of snooker tournaments played between 9 July 1979 and 17 May 1980. The following table outlines the results for the ranking and the invitational events.

== New professional players ==
The World Professional Billiards and Snooker Association (WPBSA) accepted applications for professional status by Cliff Wilson, Joe Johnson, Tony Meo and Mike Hallett before the start of the season; and from Sid Hood, Eddie Sinclair, and Mark Wildman later in 1979r. Kingsley Kennerley moved from honorary member status back to playing status. Jim Wych, John Bear, Mario Morra, Paul Thornley, Bernie Mikkelsen, Frank Jonik and Kevin Robitaille were recognised as professionals as members of the new Canadian Professional Snooker Association.

== Calendar ==
Date (Note: Dates use the mm-dd date format.)			Rank	Tournament name	Venue	City	Winner	Runner-up	Score	Reference
07-09	07-20	RSA	NR	Limosin International	Good Hope Centre	Cape Town	(Australia) Eddie Charlton	(England) John Spencer	23–19	
07-??	07-??	RSA	NR	Kronenbrau 1308 Classic		Johannesburg	(Australia) Eddie Charlton	(Wales) Ray Reardon	7–4	
08-??	08-??	RSA	NR	South African Professional Championship			(South Africa) Derek Mienie	(South Africa) Jimmy van Rensberg	9–6	
08-??	08-??	AUS	NR	Australian Masters	Channel 10 Television Studios	Sydney	(Australia) Ian Anderson	(South Africa) Perrie Mans	(Note: The final was decided on aggregate score over three frames.)	
09-??	09-??	CAN	NR	Canadian Open	Canadian National Exhibition Stadium	Toronto	(Canada) Cliff Thorburn	(Wales) Terry Griffiths	17–16	
10–20	10–27	ENG	TE	World Challenge Cup	Haden Hill Leisure Centre	Birmingham	Wales	England	14–3	
11–19	12–01	ENG	NR	UK Championship	Guild Hall	Preston	(England) John Virgo	(Wales) Terry Griffiths	14–13	
12–27	12–30	ENG	NR	Pot Black (Note: Event was played and recorded in December 1979, but broadcast in the spring of 1980.)	BBC Studios	Birmingham	(Australia) Eddie Charlton	(Wales) Ray Reardon	2–1	
01–07	01–08	ENG	NR	The Classic	New Century Hall	Manchester	(England) John Spencer	(Northern Ireland) Alex Higgins	4–3	
01–14	01–17	ENG	NR	Padmore Super Crystalate International	Gala Baths	West Bromwich	(Northern Ireland) Alex Higgins	(South Africa) Perrie Mans	4–2	
01–27	01–29	WAL	NR	Welsh Professional Championship	Ebbw Vale Leisure Centre	Ebbw Vale	(Wales) Doug Mountjoy	(Wales) Ray Reardon	9–6	
02-??	02-??	ENG	NR	Tolly Cobbold Classic	Corn Exchange	Ipswich	(Northern Ireland) Alex Higgins	(Northern Ireland) Dennis Taylor	5–4	
02–05	02–09	ENG	NR	The Masters	Wembley Conference Centre	London	(Wales) Terry Griffiths	(Northern Ireland) Alex Higgins	9–5	
02-02	02–12	IND	NR	Bombay International	Bombay Gymkhana	Bombay	(England) John Virgo	(Canada) Cliff Thorburn	13–7	
02–13	02–16	IRL	NR	Irish Masters	Goff's	Kill	(Wales) Terry Griffiths	(Wales) Doug Mountjoy	9–8	
02–24	02–28	ENG	NR	British Gold Cup	Assembly Rooms	Derby	(Northern Ireland) Alex Higgins	(Wales) Ray Reardon	5–1	
03–18	03–22	CAN	NR	Canadian Professional Championship	Masonic Temple	Toronto	(Canada) Cliff Thorburn	(Canada) Jim Wych	9–6	
04–02	04–03	SCO	NR	Scottish Professional Championship	Cumbernauld Theatre	Kildrum	(Scotland) Eddie Sinclair	(Scotland) Chris Ross	11–6	
04–17	04–19	NIR	NR	Irish Professional Championship	Ulster Hall	Belfast	(Northern Ireland) Dennis Taylor	(Northern Ireland) Alex Higgins	21–15	
04–22	05-05	ENG	WR	World Snooker Championship	Crucible Theatre	Sheffield	(Canada) Cliff Thorburn	(Northern Ireland) Alex Higgins	18–16	
05–03	05–10	WAL	NR	Pontins Professional	Pontins	Prestatyn	(England) John Virgo	(Wales) Ray Reardon	9–6	
05–10	05–17	ENG	NR	Pontins Camber Sands	Camber Sands Holiday Village	Rye	(Northern Ireland) Alex Higgins	(Northern Ireland) Dennis Taylor	9–7	

WR = World ranking event
NR = Non-ranking event
TE = Team event

== Official rankings ==
The top 16 of the world rankings.

No.	Ch.	Name
1	Steady	(Wales) Ray Reardon
2	▲	(Northern Ireland) Dennis Taylor
3	Steady	(Australia) Eddie Charlton
4	Steady	(England) John Spencer
5	Steady	(Canada) Cliff Thorburn
6	Steady	(England) Fred Davis
7	▼	(South Africa) Perrie Mans
8	New entry	(Wales) Terry Griffiths
9	Steady	(England) Graham Miles
10	▲	(England) John Virgo
11	▼	(Northern Ireland) Alex Higgins
12	Steady	(Canada) Bill Werbeniuk
13	▲	(Wales) Doug Mountjoy
14	▼	(England) John Pulman
15	▼	(England) David Taylor
16	▼	(Republic of Ireland) Patsy Fagan
