= 1986 South African Professional Championship =

South African Professional Championship
Tournament information
- Dates: August 1986
- Venue: Summit Club
- City: Johannesburg
- Country: South Africa
- Organisation: WPBSA
- Format: Non-ranking event
- Total prize fund: R50,000 and £8,000
- Winner's share: R7,000 and £2,500

Final
- Champion: Silvino Francisco
- Runner-up: Francois Ellis
- Score: 9–1

The 1986 South African Professional Championship was a non-ranking snooker tournament, which took place in August 1986 at the Summit Club, Johannesburg. The tournament featured eleven South African players.

Silvino Francisco won his first national title with a 9–1 victory over Francois Ellis in the final.

The tournament was sponsored by the South African insurance company Colonial Mutual, which provided R50,000 in prize money. Francisco received R7,000 of this as winner. Additionally, the World Professional Billiards and Snooker Association (WPBSA) funded £8,000 in prize money through its national championship subsidy, a scheme which provided £1,000 per entrant. Three of the eleven entrants (Blignaut, Amdor and Johnston) were recognised as professionals only in South Africa and not by the WPBSA. Francisco received £2,500 as winner.

== Main draw ==
Round 1 Best of 11 Frames
Peter Francisco	6
Victor Blignaut	3
Francois Ellis	6
Roy Amdor	2
Derek Mienie	6
Mike Hines	5

Quarter-finals; Best of 13 Frames
Silvino Francisco	7
Gary Johnston	0
Peter Francisco	7
Robbie Grace	1
Francois Ellis	7
Perrie Mans	6
Jimmy van Rensberg	7
Derek Mienie	1

Semi-finals; Best of 15 Frames
Silvino Francisco	8
Peter Francisco	3
Francois Ellis	8
Jimmy van Rensberg	2

Final; Best of 17 Frames
Silvino Francisco	9
Francois Ellis	1
