= 1988 South African Professional Championship =

South African Professional Championship
Tournament information
- Dates: January 1988
- Country: South Africa
- Organisation: WPBSA
- Format: Non-ranking event

Final
- Champion: Francois Ellis
- Runner-up: Jimmy van Rensberg
- Score: 9–4

The 1988 South African Professional Championship was a non-ranking snooker tournament, which took place in January 1988. The tournament featured four South African players.

Francois Ellis won the title, beating Jimmy van Rensberg 9–4 in the final.

== Main draw ==
Best of 17 frames

Semi-final
Francois Ellis	9
Robbie Grace	8
Jimmy van Rensberg	9
Perrie Mans	4

Final
Francois Ellis	9
Jimmy van Rensberg	4
