= 1989 South African Professional Championship =

South African Professional Championship
Tournament information
- Dates: January 1989
- Country: South Africa
- Organisation: WPBSA
- Format: Non-ranking event

Final
- Champion: Perrie Mans
- Runner-up: Robbie Grace
- Score: 8–5

The 1989 South African Professional Championship was a non-ranking snooker tournament, which took place in January 1989. The tournament featured eleven South African players.

Perrie Mans won the title, beating Robbie Grace 8–5 in the final.

== Main draw ==
Round 1 Best of 9 Frames
Mike Hines	5
Roy Amdor	2

Quarter-finals; Best of 9 Frames
Perrie Mans	5
Derek Mienie	0
Mike Hines	5
Francois Ellis	1
Robbie Grace	5
Lucas Blignaut	3
Victor Blignaut	5
Jimmy van Rensberg	4

Semi-finals; Best of 11 Frames
Perrie Mans	6
Mike Hines	4
Robbie Grace	6
Victor Blignaut	2

Final; Best of 15 Frames
Perrie Mans	8
Robbie Grace	5
