= 1968 World Open Match Play Snooker Championship =

Tournament information
- Dates: 24–29 July 1968
- Venue: St George's Leagues Club
- City: Sydney
- Country: Australia
- Winner's share: AUD1,000
- Highest break: Eddie Charlton (AUS), 110

Final
- Champion: Eddie Charlton (AUS)
- Runner-up: Rex Williams (ENG)
- Score: 43–30

The 1968 World Open Match Play Snooker Championship was a snooker match between Rex Williams and Eddie Charlton for the title won first won by Fred Davis at the 1960 World Open Snooker Championship and then by Williams in the 1967 World Open Snooker Championship. Despite the name of the competition, Williams and Charlton were the only contestants in 1968. Charlton took the title by winning 43 frames to Williams' 30, a winning margin having been achieved at 37–20.

== Summary ==
Fred Davis had won the 1960 World Open Snooker Championship, which was held in Australia with eight players competing in a round-robin. Davis and Rex Williams arranged to play a series of 51 five-frame matches from November 1966 to April 1967, with the winner taking the title, billed as the World Open Snooker Championship. Williams reached a winning margin at 26–23, after which Davis won the last two matches to make the final score 26–25.

In July 1968, in a match sanctioned by the Billiards Association and Control Council, Charlton challenged Williams for the title, now referred to as the World Open Match Play Snooker Championship, and AUD1,000. The match took place at the St George's Leagues Club, Sydney, as the best of 73 frames, with twelve frames played on each day except the last, when thirteen were played. The start of the match was delayed for two days as Williams was suffering from tonsillitis, and started on 24 July, with Charlton taking a 7–5 lead on the first day, overturning Williams' 4–2 lead from the afternoon session by winning five of the six frames in the evening. Charlton extended this to 14–10 by the end of the second day, and by the end of play on 28 July, had reached a winning margin, at 37–23. The last day, 29 July, finished with Charlton 43–30 ahead.

The highest break of the match was 110, compiled by Charlton in the 61st frame. Williams' highest break, and the second-highest of the match, was 89.
