= Bombay International =

Snooker tournament

Tournament information
- Venue: Bombay Gymkhana
- Location: Bombay
- Country: India
- Established: 1979
- Organisation(s): WPBSA
- Format: Invitational event
- Final year: 1980
- Final champion: (England) John Virgo

The Bombay International was a professional invitational snooker tournament. The winners of the two editions were John Spencer and John Virgo respectively.

== History ==
This was the first snooker tournament to be held in both India and Asia. In its first year it featured six players in round-robin, with John Spencer winning the most matches and topping the table to collect the £2,000 prize. In its second year, eight players competed, with the addition of a knockout stage. John Virgo collected the £3,000 winners cheque, defeating Cliff Thorburn 13–7 in the final.

== Winners ==
Year	Winner	Runner-up	Final score	Season
1979	(England) John Spencer	(Northern Ireland) Dennis Taylor	Round-Robin	1978/79
1980	(England) John Virgo	(Canada) Cliff Thorburn	13–7	1979/80
