= 2005 Pot Black =

Pot Black
Tournament information
- Dates: 29 October 2005
- Venue: Royal Automobile Club
- City: London
- Country: England
- Organisation: WPBSA
- Format: Non-ranking event
- Highest break: Shaun Murphy (ENG) (111)

Final
- Champion: (Wales) Matthew Stevens
- Runner-up: (England) Shaun Murphy
- Score: 53–27

The 2005 Pot Black was a professional non-ranking snooker tournament that took place on 29 October 2005 at the Royal Automobile Club in London, England. All matches were played over one frame.

Pot Black returned after a 12-year absence (or 8 including Senior Pot Black) and unlike the original TV series of matches being recorded in 2 days and transmitted months later, this new format was shown on BBC1's Grandstand showing highlights of the matches during the programme before showing the final live. Presented by the usual BBC snooker team of Hazel Irvine, Steve Davis and John Parrott and commentary by Clive Everton. Referees include Jan Verhass and Michaela Tabb who refereed the final.

Out of this year's players, only Jimmy White, Stephen Hendry and Ronnie O'Sullivan had previously played in Pot Black in its old form while the latter two and Matthew Stevens played in Junior Pot Black and White being the only former champion competing. Although there was no prize money for the winners, every participating player was guaranteed an appearance fee of £3,500.

Matthew Stevens won the final 53–27 against Shaun Murphy. Murphy meanwhile ended Eddie Charlton's 32-year-old record of having the highest break in Pot Black with 110 when he made a 111 against Jimmy White in the quarter-finals.

== Main draw ==
Players in bold indicate match winners.

Quarter-finals
(Scotland) **John Higgins**	**64**
(Scotland) Stephen Maguire	5
(England) **Shaun Murphy**	**120**
(England) Jimmy White	2
(Scotland) Stephen Hendry	40
(Wales) **Matthew Stevens**	**73**
(England) Ronnie O'Sullivan	44
(England) **Paul Hunter**	**56**

Semi-finals
(Scotland) John Higgins	49
(England) **Shaun Murphy**	**71**
(Wales) **Matthew Stevens**	**96**
(England) Paul Hunter	7

Final
(England) Shaun Murphy	27
(Wales) **Matthew Stevens**	**53**
