= 1980 Champion of Champions =

Tournament information
- Dates: 2–12 October 1980
- Venue: New London Theatre
- City: London
- Country: England
- Organisation: WPBSA
- Format: Non-ranking event
- Total prize fund: £20,000
- Winner's share: £5,000
- Highest break: Steve Davis (ENG) (128)

Final
- Champion: Doug Mountjoy (WAL)
- Runner-up: John Virgo (ENG)
- Score: 10–8

The 1980 Champion of Champions was a professional non-ranking snooker tournament held from 2–12 October 1980 at the New London Theatre in Drury Lane, London.

== Summary ==
10 players contested the event, divided into two groups of 5. Within each group everyone played all the others in a round robin format. The winners of the groups played in the 19-frame final. In the round-robin stage matches were over 9 frames with all frames played, even after the match had been won. The New London Theatre had hosted the Masters between 1976 and 1978.

Group B was completed first. Terry Griffiths needed to win his last two matches by good margins to finish ahead of Doug Mountjoy. He led Graham Miles 5–1 but eventually only won 6–3. This result left him having to beat Mountjoy by at least 6–3 to qualify. Mountjoy took a 4–3 lead and, although Griffiths won the match 5–4, Mountjoy qualified for the final. In group A, John Virgo won all his matches 5–4 to qualify ahead of Steve Davis. In the final Virgo took a 3–0 lead but Mountjoy fought back to be just 5–4 behind after the afternoon session. In the evening session the match was level at 8–8 before Mountjoy won the next two frames to win the match in front of a crowd of 700.

The playing of "dead" frames was not popular with the players. In the first match of the tournament Steve Davis beat Dennis Taylor 5–0 but then lost the last 4 frames. He later complained that it was difficult to motivate himself after winning the match.

The tournament was not broadcast. Later in October the same venue was used for the 1980 edition of the State Express World Challenge Cup which was covered on BBC television. With no TV coverage and no sponsor the Champion of Champions was dropped from the schedule.

== Players ==
The following 10 players competed in the tournament:

Group A

- (Wales) Ray Reardon
- (England) Steve Davis
- (Canada) Kirk Stevens
- (Northern Ireland) Dennis Taylor
- (England) John Virgo

Group B

- (Wales) Terry Griffiths
- (Northern Ireland) Alex Higgins
- (England) Graham Miles
- (Wales) Doug Mountjoy
- (Canada) Cliff Thorburn

== Round-robin stage ==
=== Group A ===
John Virgo won all four of his matches 5–4 to qualify for the final.

Table

POS	Player	MP	MW	FW	FL
1	(England) John Virgo	4	4	20	16
2	(England) Steve Davis	4	3	21	15
3	(Wales) Ray Reardon	4	2	20	16
4	(Northern Ireland) Dennis Taylor	4	1	21	15
5	(Canada) Kirk Stevens	4	0	8	28

Results:

- (2 Oct) Steve Davis 5–4 Dennis Taylor
- (2 Oct) John Virgo 5–4 Kirk Stevens
- (3 Oct) John Virgo 5–4 Dennis Taylor
- (3 Oct) Steve Davis 7–2 Kirk Stevens
- (9 Oct) John Virgo 5–4 Steve Davis
- (9 Oct) Ray Reardon 5–4 Dennis Taylor
- (10 Oct) John Virgo 5–4 Ray Reardon
- (10 Oct) Dennis Taylor w/o Kirk Stevens
- (11 Oct) Ray Reardon 7–2 Kirk Stevens
- (11 Oct) Steve Davis 5–4 Ray Reardon

Kirk Stevens did not turn up for his match against Dennis Taylor. Taylor played an exhibition match against Perrie Mans, who played with a borrowed cue. In the table above a 9–0 result is used for this match.

=== Group B ===
Doug Mountjoy lost his final match to Terry Griffiths 5–4 but qualified by winning more frames overall.

Table

POS	Player	MP	MW	FW	FL
1	(Wales) Doug Mountjoy	4	3	25	11
2	(Wales) Terry Griffiths	4	3	23	13
3	(Northern Ireland) Alex Higgins	4	2	16	20
4	(England) Graham Miles	4	1	15	21
5	(Canada) Cliff Thorburn	4	1	11	25

Results:

- (4 Oct) Graham Miles 5–4 Alex Higgins
- (4 Oct) Doug Mountjoy 7–2 Alex Higgins
- (5 Oct) Alex Higgins 5–4 Terry Griffiths
- (5 Oct) Terry Griffiths 8–1 Cliff Thorburn
- (6 Oct) Doug Mountjoy 6–3 Graham Miles
- (6 Oct) Alex Higgins 5–4 Cliff Thorburn
- (7 Oct) Doug Mountjoy 8–1 Cliff Thorburn
- (7 Oct) Cliff Thorburn 5–4 Graham Miles
- (8 Oct) Terry Griffiths 6–3 Graham Miles
- (8 Oct) Terry Griffiths 5–4 Doug Mountjoy

== Final ==
Final: Best of 19 frames. Referee: unknown. New London Theatre, London, England, 12 November 1980.
Doug Mountjoy; Wales	10–8	John Virgo; England
Afternoon: 51–76; 49–81 (56); 26–108 (54); 77–15; 57–53; 60–9; 15–83 (51); 57–61 (50); 101 (101)–1; Evening: 69 (53)–47; 98 (53)–16; 31–89; 22–60 (60); 74 (53)–18; 40–35; 55–61; 65–5; 64–60
101	Highest break	60
1	Century breaks	0
4	50+ breaks	5

== Century breaks ==
The following century breaks were made during the tournament:

- 128, 100 – Steve Davis
- 119, 100 – John Virgo
- 114 – Alex Higgins
- 101 – Doug Mountjoy
- 100 – Kirk Stevens
