= 1979 UK Championship =

Non-ranking snooker tournament, November–December 1979

1979 Coral UK Championship
Tournament information
- Dates: 19 November – 1 December 1979
- Venue: Preston Guild Hall
- City: Preston
- Country: England
- Organisation: WPBSA
- Format: Non-ranking event
- Total prize fund: £15,000
- Winner's share: £4,500
- Highest break: Terry Griffiths (WAL) (119)

Final
- Champion: John Virgo (ENG)
- Runner-up: Terry Griffiths (WAL)
- Score: 14–13

The 1979 UK Championship (officially the 1979 Coral UK Championship) was a professional non-ranking snooker tournament that took place between 19 November and 1 December 1979 at the Guild Hall in Preston, England. This was the third edition of the UK Championship that would later become part of snooker's Triple Crown. The event was sponsored by Coral for the second year in a row.

John Virgo won the championship, in his only major tournament win, by defeating Terry Griffiths 14–13 in the final, despite being deducted two frames for arriving late. The defending champion, Doug Mountjoy, was defeated 5–9 by Steve Davis in the opening round. Griffiths compiled the tournament's highest break of 119 in his semi-final win over Bill Werbeniuk. The last session of the final was broadcast by the BBC on its Grandstand programme; however, due to a strike by BBC personnel, the final frames of the match – including Virgo being awarded the championship – were never broadcast or recorded.

== Tournament summary ==
The 1979 UK Championship was a professional non-ranking event held between 19 November and 1 December 1979 at the Preston Guild Hall, England. The tournament was the third edition of the annual UK Championship (the first edition was held in 1977). The event saw 27 players compete, with the highest-ranked eight players based on the previous year's World Championship receiving a bye to the last 16, and the last six players competing in a playoff round. This was the first time that any seedings list for a professional snooker tournament had occurred. Ray Reardon did not compete at the event, having signed a sponsorship contract with General Motors to only play in specific tournaments and exhibitions. Rex Williams and 1979 World Championship semi-finalist Eddie Charlton did not play at the event; they instead opted to play in a tour of Australia.

Matches until the final were contested as best-of-17-frames matches, with the final played as best-of-27-frames. The preliminary rounds saw two matches reach a final-frame decider, with both John Dunning and Jackie Rea winning matches 9–8.

=== Early rounds ===
The last 24 round was played from 20 to 23 November 1979. Future six-time world champion Steve Davis made his debut in the competition and defeated John Dunning 9–3. Another future world champion Joe Johnson also made his debut in the competition, playing his third professional tournament, but lost 3–9 to Bill Werbeniuk. All three players who competed in the preliminary round were defeated in the last 24.

The round of 16 saw Steve Davis overcome reigning champion Doug Mountjoy 9–5. World number four and three-time world champion John Spencer was defeated by Bill Werbeniuk 8–9. Former winner Patsy Fagan defeated two-time Pot Black champion Graham Miles 9–5. John Virgo defeated Tony Meo 9–6, despite being 5–0 and 5–3 down after the first session, making a break of 102 in frame 11. Dennis Taylor and Willie Thorne contested a final frame decider, with Taylor defeating Thorne to win 9–8. Having won the 1979 World Snooker Championship earlier that year, Terry Griffiths defeated Cliff Wilson 9–4.

=== Quarter–semi-finals ===
The quarter-finals were contested from 24 to 26 November 1979. John Virgo took an early lead over Steve Davis 4–3, and later 8–7 in their match. In frame 16, Virgo had the chance to win, and Davis accidentally dropped his cue, making a loud sound. Virgo still potted the next shot during the noise and make a clearance to win the match 9–7. Post-match, Davis commented to Virgo that it was the only time he had ever wanted his opponent to not miss. Elsewhere, Dennis Taylor defeated Patsy Fagan 9–6, Bill Werbeniuk defeated Ray Edmonds 9–8, and Terry Griffiths defeated Alex Higgins 9–7.

The semi-finals were played from 27 to 29 November 1979. The semi-finals were similar to the 1979 World Snooker Championship, where John Virgo played Dennis Taylor and Terry Griffiths played Eddie Charlton. In place of Charlton, Bill Webeniuk took on Griffiths. Despite having lost heavily at the world championships (12–19), Virgo defeated Taylor 9–4 to reach his only major final. In the second semi-final, Terry Griffiths defeated Werbeniuk 9–3.

=== Final ===
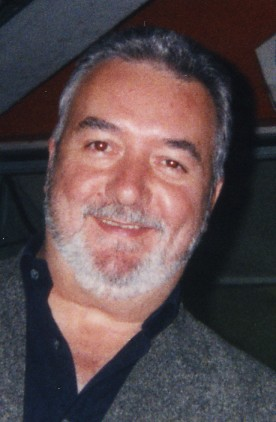
John Virgo (pictured in 2003) won his only major title defeating Terry Griffiths 14–13.

The final was contested as a best-of-27 frame match, held between 30 November and 1 December 1979. The match was held over three sessions, with two on the first day and the final on the second, between John Virgo and world champion Terry Griffiths. Virgo took an early lead, winning the first five frames including breaks of 63 and 67. Griffiths won two of the remaining frames, but trailed 7–2 after the first session. The second session saw Griffiths win the first three frames to trail 7–5 before Virgo led 11–7 at the end of the session.

The final session was played on 1 December 1979 and was broadcast on Grandstand. With the final being live on national television, the match was moved from the regular 1:45 p.m. start time to 12 noon. Virgo, having not seen that the times had changed, was reading a paper in his hotel room when he was informed that he had missed the start time for the session. Virgo was over 30 minutes late to the arena and was docked two frames for arriving late. Griffiths took the two remaining frames before the interval to tie the match 11–11.

During the interval, Griffiths approached Virgo and offered half of the prize money for the event, apologetic at the situation of having frames awarded. Virgo replied: "You haven't won it yet," noting the match hadn't finished. Virgo won frame 23 to lead 12–11, before Griffiths tied the match again at 12–12. Griffiths made a break of 68 to lead 13–12, before a break of 50 in frame 26 by Virgo took the match into a deciding frame. Virgo won the final frame to claim the match 14–13 and his sole major title win. The final frames of the final were unaired, due to a strike of BBC staff, with cameramen leaving the arena during the final frame.

== Main draw ==
The following is the full results from the event. Players in bold are denoting match winners.

**Preliminary round**
Best of 17 frames

**John Dunning** (ENG) **9**–8 David Greaves (ENG)

**Mike Hallett** (ENG) **9**–1 Maurice Parkin (ENG)

**Jackie Rea** (NIR) **9**–8 Bernard Bennett (ENG)

**Last 24**
Best of 17 frames

**Steve Davis** (ENG) **9**–3 John Dunning (ENG)

**Tony Meo** (ENG) **9**–7 David Taylor (ENG)

**Willie Thorne** (ENG) **9**–4 Roy Andrewartha (WAL)

**Patsy Fagan** (IRL) **9**–4 Mike Hallett (ENG)

**Bill Werbeniuk** (CAN) **9**–3 Joe Johnson (ENG)

**Ray Edmonds** (ENG) **9**–3 Jim Meadowcroft (ENG)

**Pat Houlihan** (ENG) **9**–3 Jackie Rea (NIR)

**Cliff Wilson** (WAL) **9**–7 John Pulman (ENG)

Round of 16
(Wales) Doug Mountjoy	5
(England) **Steve Davis**	**9**
(England) **John Virgo**	**9**
(England) Tony Meo	6
(Northern Ireland) **Dennis Taylor**	**9**
(England) Willie Thorne	8
(England) Graham Miles	5
(Republic of Ireland) **Patsy Fagan**	**9**
(England) John Spencer	8
(Canada) **Bill Werbeniuk**	**9**
(England) Fred Davis	6
(England) **Ray Edmonds**	**9**
(Northern Ireland) **Alex Higgins**	**9**
(England) Pat Houlihan	3
(Wales) **Terry Griffiths**	**9**
(Wales) Cliff Wilson	4

Quarter-finals
(England) Steve Davis	7
(England) **John Virgo**	**9**
(Northern Ireland) **Dennis Taylor**	**9**
(Republic of Ireland) Patsy Fagan	6
(Canada) **Bill Werbeniuk**	**9**
(England) Ray Edmonds	8
(Northern Ireland) Alex Higgins	7
(Wales) **Terry Griffiths**	**9**

Semi-finals
(England) **John Virgo**	**9**
(Northern Ireland) Dennis Taylor	4
(Canada) Bill Werbeniuk	3
(Wales) **Terry Griffiths**	**9**

Final
(England) **John Virgo**	**14**
(Wales) Terry Griffiths	13

=== Final ===
Final: Best of 27 frames. Referee: The Guild Hall, Preston, England, 30 November and 1 December 1979.
**John Virgo**; England	**14**–13	Terry Griffiths; Wales
First session: **70**–60, **67**–9, **81**–24, **100**–24 (**63**), **103**–26 (**67**), 52–**61**, **73**–24 (**69**), **96**–29, 22–**90**; Second session: 32–**68**, 4–**126** (**60**), 49–**51**, **86**–38, 50–**59**, **136**–3 (**93**), **57**–56 (**57**), 8–**108** (**71**), **55**–45; Third session: **2–0 Griffiths** (Virgo docked 2 frames) 43–**61**, 50–**73**, **65**–44, 17–**91** (**56**), 26–**96** (**68**), **74**–19 (**50**), **78**–8
**93**	Highest break	71
0	Century breaks	0
**6**	50+ breaks	4

== Century breaks ==
A total of five century breaks were made during the tournament, the highest of which being a 119 by Terry Griffiths.

- 119, 118 – Terry Griffiths
- 104 – Alex Higgins
- 103 – Pat Houlihan
- 102 – John Virgo
