= Perrie Mans =

South African snooker player (1940–2023)

Personal information
- Born: 15 October 1940 Lichtenburg, Cape Province, Union of South Africa
- Died: 13 September 2023 (aged 82)

Sport
- Country: South Africa
- Sport: Snooker
- Professional: 1961–1987
- Highest ranking: 2 (1978/79)
- Best ranking finish: Runner-up (x1)

Pierre "Perrie" Mans (25 October 1940 – 13 September 2023) was a South African professional snooker player. He first won the South African Professional Championship in 1965 and lifted the title 20 times. Mans won the Benson & Hedges Masters in 1979 and reached the final of the World Championship in 1978.

He was also the 1991 South African Eightball champion, beating Robbie Grace.

== Background ==
Mans' father, Peter Mans, who died in 1975, was also a professional snooker player, making the quarter-finals of the 1950 World Snooker Championship.

== Snooker career ==
Mans won the South African Amateur Championship in 1960, the only occasion in which he competed in the event. He then turned professional and took the South African Professional Championship from Fred Van Rensburg in 1965.

Mans first entered the World Snooker Championship in 1970. His first victory in the Championship came in the 1973 event when he defeated Ron Gross 9–2 before losing 8–16 to Eddie Charlton. However, in 1974, he pulled off a major surprise by defeating John Spencer 15–13 in the second round, before being defeated by Rex Williams in the quarter-final 4–15. In the 1976 event, he defeated Graham Miles 15–10 and Jim Meadowcroft 15–8 to reach the semi-final where he lost 10–20 to defending champion Ray Reardon.

In 1977, he was invited to take part in BBC TV's Pot Black programme which he duly won at his first attempt beating Fred Davis, Ray Reardon and Willie Thorne (over single frames) before defeating Doug Mountjoy 90 points to 21 in the final. During the final he also took the highest break prize with an effort of 59.

His career peaked in 1978, when he reached the final of the world championships, losing 18–25 to Ray Reardon. During that championship he defeated reigning Champion John Spencer 13–8, before achieving wins over Graham Miles (13–7) and Fred Davis (18–16). In the final, he never led Reardon, but held him to 17–18, before Reardon pulled away. He reached number two in the world rankings as a result; at that time rankings were based purely on the world championships of the three previous seasons.

1978 also saw Mans win the Heidelberg 100 event, defeating Silvino Francisco 9–3 in the final. This same year brought him greater company in the South African professional ranks when Silvino Francisco, Mannie Francisco, Jimmy van Rensberg, Derek Mienie and Roy Amdor all turned professional.

Mans' most notable tournament success was the Benson and Hedges Masters in 1979, beating Cliff Thorburn 5–4, Ray Reardon 5–3 and, in the final, Alex Higgins 8–4, winning the competition with a top break of just 48.

In January 1980, Mans defeated Bill Werbeniuk 3–0 and John Spencer 3–2 before losing 2–4 to Alex Higgins in the final of the Padmore/Super Crystalate International event held at the Gala Baths, West Bromwich.

In January 1981, he pulled off the shock of the season by defeating strong favourite Steve Davis 5–3 in the first round of the 1981 Masters event. Mans lost 4–5 to Cliff Thorburn in the quarter-final.

In the 1982 World Championship, he defeated Tony Meo in the first round. Meo led 3–0, but Mans overtook him to lead 9–8. This looked likely to become 9–9 when Mans trailed 54 points to 0 in the penultimate frame. However, Mans then completed a clearance of 62 to win frame and match. He went on to lose 6–13 in the next round to Jimmy White.

Mans' last victory at the Crucible Theatre came in 1983 when he defeated Scottish debutant Ian Black 10–3, compiling breaks of 57, 65 and 69. However, an in-form Kirk Stevens defeated Mans 13–3 in the second round, a defeat which put Mans outside the top 16 in the world rankings.

Mans last played in the World Championship in 1986. He defeated Les Dodd 10–7 in the final qualifying round but despite holding Doug Mountjoy to 3–4, he lost his first round match 3–10. Earlier in the season he had partnered Australian John Campbell to the quarter-final of the Hofmeister World Doubles, where they lost just 4–5 to Ray Reardon and Tony Jones.

Mans played in only two ranking events the following season (and the world doubles), failing to win any matches he slumped to fiftieth in the world rankings. He announced his retirement from professional snooker in July 1987 at the age of 46. After this, he ran a business in Johannesburg, importing snooker accessories.

In 1997, Mans returned briefly to the UK snooker scene after a twelve-year hiatus, participating in the "Seniors" Pot Black special on BBC2 timed to coincide with the 1997 World Championship, which marked the 20th anniversary of the tournament being held at the Crucible Theatre. At 57, Mans lost to eventual winner Joe Johnson. Mans returned again to play in the seniors event in the autumn of 2000, losing his first match 82 points to 13 to Canadian Jim Wych.

== Playing style ==
A left-hander, Mans was famous for his long powerful pots, as well as his fashionable waistcoats.

== Death ==
Mans died on 13 September 2023, aged 82.

== Performance and rankings timeline ==
| Tournament | 1970/ 71 | 1971/ 72 | 1972/ 73 | 1973/ 74 | 1974/ 75 | 1975/ 76 | 1976/ 77 | 1977/ 78 | 1978/ 79 | 1979/ 80 | 1980/ 81 | 1981/ 82 | 1982/ 83 | 1983/ 84 | 1984/ 85 | 1985/ 86 | 1986/ 87 | 1987/ 88 | 1988/ 89 |
|---|---|---|---|---|---|---|---|---|---|---|---|---|---|---|---|---|---|---|---|
| Ranking | No ranking system | | | | | | 7 | 10 | 2 | 7 | 7 | 15 | 11 | 17 | 24 | 30 | 36 | (Note: He was an amateur.) | |
Ranking tournaments
| International Open (Note: The event was also called the Goya Matchroom Trophy (1985/1986)) | Tournament Not Held | | | | | | | | | | | NR | 2R | LQ | LQ | 1R | WD | A | A |
| Grand Prix (Note: The event was also called the Professional Players Tournament (1982/93–1983/1984)) | Tournament Not Held | | | | | | | | | | | | 2R | A | 1R | 1R | WD | A | A |
| UK Championship | Tournament Not Held | | | | | | | Non-Ranking Event | | | | | | | LQ | 1R | WD | A | A |
| Classic | Tournament Not Held | | | | | | | | | Non-Ranking Event | | | | A | A | 2R | LQ | A | A |
| British Open (Note: The event was also called the British Gold Cup (1979/1980), Yamaha Organs Trophy (1980/1981) and International Masters (1981/1982–1983/1984)) | Tournament Not Held | | | | | | | | | Non-Ranking Event | | | | | A | 2R | LQ | A | A |
| World Championship | Non-Ranking | | | QF | 1R | SF | 1R | F | 1R | 2R | 2R | 2R | 2R | LQ | A | 1R | A | A | A |
Non-ranking tournaments
| South African Professional Championship | W | W | W | W | W | W | W | W | W | SF | W | W | W | W | A | A | QF | SF | W |
| The Masters | Tournament Not Held | | | | A | A | QF | A | W | QF | QF | A | A | A | A | A | A | A | A |
| Pontins Professional | Not Held | | | A | A | A | RR | RR | RR | QF | A | A | A | A | A | A | A | A | A |
Former non-ranking tournaments
| World Championship | RR | A | 2R | Ranking Event | | | | | | | | | | | | | | | |
| World Masters | Tournament Not Held | | | | RR | Tournament Not Held | | | | | | | | | | | | | |
| World Matchplay Championship | Tournament Not Held | | | | | | QF | Tournament Not Held | | | | | | | | | | | |
| Holsten Lager International | Tournament Not Held | | | | | | | | 1R | Tournament Not Held | | | | | | | | | |
| Limosin International | Tournament Not Held | | | | | | | | | QF | Tournament Not Held | | | | | | | | |
| Kronenbrau 1308 Classic | Tournament Not Held | | | | | | | | | SF | Tournament Not Held | | | | | | | | |
| Padmore Super Crystalate | Tournament Not Held | | | | | | | | | F | Tournament Not Held | | | | | | | | |
| Pot Black | A | A | A | A | A | A | W | A | SF | RR | A | A | A | A | A | A | Not Held | | |
| International Open (Note: The event was also called the Goya Matchroom Trophy (1985/1986)) | Tournament Not Held | | | | | | | | | | | 2R | Ranking Event | | | | | | |

Performance Table Legend
| LQ | lost in the qualifying draw | #R | lost in the early rounds of the tournament (WR = Wildcard round, RR = Round robin) | QF | lost in the quarter-finals |
| SF | lost in the semi-finals | F | lost in the final | W | won the tournament |
| DNQ | did not qualify for the tournament | A | did not participate in the tournament | WD | withdrew from the tournament |

| NH / Not Held | means an event was not held. |
| NR / Non-Ranking Event | means an event is/was no longer a ranking event. |
| R / Ranking Event | means an event is/was a ranking event. |

== Career finals ==
=== Ranking finals: 1 ===
Legend
World Championship (0–1)
Other (0–0)

| Outcome | No. | Year | Championship | Opponent in the final | Score |
|---|---|---|---|---|---|
| Runner-up | 1. | 1978 | World Snooker Championship | (Wales) Ray Reardon | 18–25 |

=== Non-ranking finals: 26 (23 titles) ===
Legend
The Masters (1–0)
Other (22–3)

| Outcome | No. | Year | Championship | Opponent in the final | Score |
|---|---|---|---|---|---|
| Winner | 1–13. | 1965–1977 | South African Professional Championship (1–13) | (South Africa) Various challengers | N/A |
| Winner | 14. | 1977 | Pot Black | (Wales) Doug Mountjoy | 1–0 |
| Winner | 15. | 1978 | South African Professional Championship (14) | (South Africa) Silvino Francisco | 9–5 |
| Winner | 16. | 1978 | Heidelberg 100 Tournament | (South Africa) Silvino Francisco | 9–3 |
| Runner-up | 1. | 1979 | Australian Masters | (Australia) Ian Anderson | Aggregate Score |
| Winner | 17. | 1979 | The Masters | (Northern Ireland) Alex Higgins | 8–4 |
| Runner-up | 2. | 1980 | Padmore Super Crystalate International | (Northern Ireland) Alex Higgins | 2–4 |
| Winner | 18–22. | 1980–1984 | South African Professional Championship (15–19) | (South Africa) Various challengers | N/A |
| Runner-up | 3. | 1984 | South African Professional Championship | (South Africa) Jimmy van Rensberg | 7–10 |
| Winner | 23. | 1989 | South African Professional Championship (20) | (South Africa) Robbie Grace | 8–5 |

=== Amateur finals: 1 (1 title) ===
| Outcome | No. | Year | Championship | Opponent in the final | Score |
|---|---|---|---|---|---|
| Winner | 1. | 1960 | South African Amateur Championship | (South Africa) | |
