= Pot Black =

Snooker tournament

Tournament information
- Venue: Sheffield City Hall
- Location: Sheffield
- Country: England
- Established: 1969
- Organisation(s): World Professional Billiards and Snooker Association
- Format: Non-ranking event
- Final year: 2007
- Final champion: Ken Doherty (IRL)

Pot Black was a snooker tournament in the United Kingdom broadcast on the BBC. Each match was contested over a single frame, where other tournaments were significantly longer. The event carried no ranking points, but played a large part in the popularisation of the modern game of snooker. The event was first held in 1969 with a field of eight players and ran annually until 1986. The event resurfaced for three years in both 1991 and 2005. The series was followed by events for other categories of players, with juniors and seniors events, and a celebrity version held in 2006.

The series was created by the BBC2 controller David Attenborough, shortly after BBC2 began broadcasting in colour. Snooker, a game using coloured balls, was suggested as a suitable way to sell the new technology. The series helped transform snooker from a minority sport played by just a handful of professionals into one of the most popular sports in the UK. Mark Williams made the highest break in the competition's history, a 119.

== History ==
The BBC began broadcasting in colour in 1967 and was on the lookout for programmes that would exploit the new technology. The idea of broadcasting snooker, then still a minor sport, was the brainchild of David Attenborough, who was the controller of BBC2 at the time. Based on coloured balls, the game of snooker was recognised as a good way to promote the BBC's new colour broadcasting capability.

The first Pot Black tournament was held in 1969 at the BBC Studios in Birmingham, and the recorded Pot Black programme was aired on BBC2 on 23 July 1969. This first edition featured eight players: Gary Owen, Jackie Rea, John Pulman, Ray Reardon, Fred Davis, Rex Williams, Kingsley Kennerley and John Spencer, the eventual winner being Reardon. The programme continued until 1986, by which time an increasing number of snooker events were being televised and the Pot Black format was becoming outdated. The programme was revived in 1990 but was then discontinued after the 1993 edition.

A one-day Pot Black tournament was held on 29 October 2005, and the final match was broadcast live on the BBC's Grandstand programme. The eight players in the 2005 event were: Ronnie O'Sullivan, Stephen Hendry, Stephen Maguire, Matthew Stevens, Paul Hunter, John Higgins, Jimmy White and Shaun Murphy, with Stevens beating Murphy in the final. The 2006 edition of the tournament took place at the Royal Automobile Club in Central London on 2 September 2006; Mark Williams defeated John Higgins in the final with a 119 clearance, the highest break in the event's history. In the 2007 edition, the last Pot Black (to date) which aired on Saturday 6 October 2007, Ken Doherty won the final 71–36 against Murphy.

There have been six century breaks compiled at the event. The first was Eddie Charlton's break of 110 against Spencer in 1973, which stood as the tournament's record for many years until overtaken by Murphy's 111 against White in 2005, and the 119 clearance by Williams in 2006.

== Format ==
The Pot Black tournament used several formats over its history. Eight players participated in the first event, but the number of players varied between six and sixteen over the years. It was originally played as a knockout tournament, but later employed a round-robin format. The total number of points scored by each player could often become crucial, so the matches were always played to a conclusion with the potting of the black ball. Most of the matches were played over a single frame. Several formats were employed for the final match, which was also played over just one frame for the first few years; an aggregate score over two frames was tried in 1974, but this format was abandoned and the single-frame final was reinstated in 1975; the final was decided over three frames from 1978 to 1986, and in 1991. A shot clock timer was added in 1991, to limit the amount of time each player could spend at the table.

A Junior Pot Black ran for three years, from 1981 to 1983, and again in 1991. The winners were Dean Reynolds, John Parrott (twice) and Ronnie O'Sullivan. The junior tournament was revived in 2006 as a side event to the World Snooker Championship, with the final played on the main match table. A Seniors Pot Black was held in 1997, featuring players aged over 40 at the time. Joe Johnson won the senior event.

A one-frame Celebrity Pot Black took place on 15 July 2006 for Sport Relief. It was contested between two teams: Ronnie O'Sullivan and Bradley Walsh against Steve Davis and Vernon Kay. The winning team was Davis and Kay. The match was refereed by Michaela Tabb, presented by Dermot O'Leary and commentated by John Parrott.

== Production ==
Each Pot Black tournament was recorded in a single day at the BBC's Pebble Mill Studios in Birmingham, and the matches were then shown in half-hour Pot Black programmes on BBC2 over the winter. The press co-operated by not revealing the scores until after a match had been transmitted. In 2005 and 2006, the whole tournament was broadcast in a single day. Pot Black's theme tune was "Black and White Rag", composed by George Botsford and performed by Winifred Atwell.

The first series of Pot Black in 1969 was presented by Keith Macklin. It was then hosted by Alan Weeks until 1984, and David Icke in 1985 and 1986. Eamonn Holmes was host in 1991 and 1992, and he was replaced by David Vine in 1993. Vine also presented Senior Pot Black in 1997. The latest revival of the programme in the early 2000s was hosted by Hazel Irvine.

Pot Black is credited with producing one of the most memorable British sports quotes. Commentator Ted Lowe, aware that not all viewers had colour televisions at the time, said "Steve is going for the pink ball – and for those of you who are watching in black and white, the pink is next to the green."

== Winners ==
Below is a list of the winners by tournament.

=== Pot Black ===
Year	Winner	Runner-up	Final score (frames)	Final score (points)	Highest break
1969	Ray Reardon (WAL)	John Spencer (ENG)	1–0	88–29	Ray Reardon (WAL) (99)
1970	John Spencer (ENG)	Ray Reardon (WAL)	1–0	88–27	Fred Davis (ENG) (54)
1971	John Spencer (ENG)	Fred Davis (ENG)	1–0	61–40	Fred Davis (ENG) (73)
1972	Eddie Charlton (AUS)	Ray Reardon (WAL)	1–0	75–43	John Spencer (ENG) (66)
1973	Eddie Charlton (AUS)	Rex Williams (ENG)	1–0	93–33	Eddie Charlton (AUS) (110)
1974	Graham Miles (ENG)	John Spencer (ENG)	Aggregate score (Note: Final decided on aggregate score over two frames. The individual frame scores were 77–37 and 70–49.)	147–86	Graham Miles (ENG) (68)
1975	Graham Miles (ENG)	Dennis Taylor (NIR)	1–0	81–27	Fred Davis (ENG) (87)
1976	John Spencer (ENG)	Dennis Taylor (NIR)	1–0	69–42	Eddie Charlton (AUS) (64)
1977	Perrie Mans (RSA)	Doug Mountjoy (WAL)	1–0	90–21	Perrie Mans (RSA) (59)
1978	Doug Mountjoy (WAL)	Graham Miles (ENG)	2–1	43–55, 97–23, 111–16	Doug Mountjoy (WAL) (101)
1979	Ray Reardon (WAL)	Doug Mountjoy (WAL)	2–1	79–51, 25–82, 84–41	Doug Mountjoy (WAL) (82)
1980	Eddie Charlton (AUS)	Ray Reardon (WAL)	2–1	16–74, 85–30, 68–54	Dennis Taylor (NIR) (87)
1981	Cliff Thorburn (CAN)	Jim Wych (CAN)	2–0	68–39, 85–50	Kirk Stevens (CAN) (79)
1982	Steve Davis (ENG)	Eddie Charlton (AUS)	2–0	82–40, 85–38	Eddie Charlton (AUS) (98)
1983	Steve Davis (ENG)	Ray Reardon (WAL)	2–0	61–60, 82–47	Ray Reardon (WAL) (91)
1984	Terry Griffiths (WAL)	John Spencer (ENG)	2–1	57–65, 77–8, 70–35	Dennis Taylor (NIR) (81)
1985	Doug Mountjoy (WAL)	Jimmy White (ENG)	2–0	64–5, 66–30	Jimmy White (ENG) (80)
1986	Jimmy White (ENG)	Kirk Stevens (CAN)	2–0	60–46, 106–21	Jimmy White (ENG) (106)
1991	Steve Davis (ENG)	Stephen Hendry (SCO)	2–1	62–40, 4–101, 80–18	
1992	Neal Foulds (ENG)	James Wattana (THA)	252–176 points		
1993	Steve Davis (ENG)	Mike Hallett (ENG)	2–0		David Roe (ENG) (104)
2005	Matthew Stevens (WAL)	Shaun Murphy (ENG)	1–0	53–27	Shaun Murphy (ENG) (111)
2006	Mark Williams (WAL)	John Higgins (SCO)	1–0	119–13	Mark Williams (WAL) (119)
2007	Ken Doherty (IRL)	Shaun Murphy (ENG)	1–0	71–36	Graeme Dott (SCO) (67)

=== Junior Pot Black ===
Year	Winner	Runner-up	Final score (frames)	Final score (points)
1981	Dean Reynolds (ENG)	Dene O'Kane (NZL)		151–79 (Note: Final decided on aggregate score over two frames)
1982	John Parrott (ENG)	John Keers (ENG)		169–70
1983	John Parrott (ENG)	Steve Ventham (ENG)	1–1	Pink ball game
1991	Ronnie O'Sullivan (ENG)	Declan Murphy (IRL)	2–0	126–0, 98–30
2006	Stuart Carrington (ENG)	Anthony McGill (SCO)	1–0	58–46
2007	Mitchell Mann (ENG)	Jack Lisowski (ENG)	1–0	76–23
2008	Jason Devaney (IRL)	Duane Jones (WAL)	1–0	61–28
2009	Ross Muir (SCO)	Jak Jones (WAL)	1–0	24–13 (Note: Events were played with the six-red snooker variant.)
2010	Jamie Clarke (WAL)	Tom Rees (WAL)	1–0	43–30

=== Seniors Pot Black ===
Year	Winner	Runner-up	Final score (frames)	Final score (points)
1997	Joe Johnson (ENG)	Terry Griffiths (WAL)	2–0	85–32, 70–17
