= 1979 Kronenbrau 1308 Classic =

Kronenbrau 1308 Classic
Tournament information
- Dates: July 1979
- City: Johannesburg
- Country: South Africa
- Organisation: WPBSA
- Format: Non-Ranking event
- Winner's share: R2,500

Final
- Champion: (Australia) Eddie Charlton
- Runner-up: (Wales) Ray Reardon
- Score: 7–4

The 1979 Kronenbrau 1308 Classic was a non-ranking invitational snooker tournament, which took place in July 1979. The tournament was played in Johannesburg and featured four professional players - Ray Reardon of Wales, Eddie Charlton of Australia and South Africans Perrie Mans and Jimmy van Rensberg. Charlton received R2,500 prize money as the champion.

Charlton won the title, beating Reardon 7–4 in the final.

== Main draw ==
Results for the tournament are shown below.

Best of 11 frames
(Australia) Eddie Charlton	6
(South Africa) Jimmy van Rensberg	1
(Wales) Ray Reardon	6
(South Africa) Perrie Mans	1

Best of 13 frames
(Australia) Eddie Charlton	7
(Wales) Ray Reardon	4
