= 2007 Pot Black =

Pot Black
Tournament information
- Dates: 6 October 2007
- Venue: Sheffield City Hall
- City: Sheffield
- Country: England
- Organisation: WPBSA
- Format: Non-ranking event
- Highest break: 67 – Graeme Dott

Final
- Champion: (Republic of Ireland) Ken Doherty
- Runner-up: (England) Shaun Murphy
- Score: 1–0 (71–36)

The 2007 Pot Black was a professional non-ranking snooker tournament that was held on 6 October 2007 at the Sheffield City Hall in Sheffield, England. All matches were played over one frame.

Ken Doherty became the first Irish Pot Black champion by defeating Shaun Murphy 1–0 (71–36) in the final. The two-time world champion Ronnie O'Sullivan turned down an invitation to participate in the tournament, citing "personal commitments". This was the last edition of Pot Black to be staged.

== Main draw ==
Players highlighted in bold denote match winners.

Quarter-finals
(England) Peter Ebdon	4
(England) **Shaun Murphy**	**74**
(Scotland) **Stephen Hendry**	**63**
(Australia) Neil Robertson	45
(Republic of Ireland) **Ken Doherty**	**72**
(Scotland) John Higgins	20
(Wales) Mark Williams	1
(Scotland) **Graeme Dott**	**80**

Semi-finals
(England) **Shaun Murphy**	**63**
(Scotland) Stephen Hendry	0
(Republic of Ireland) **Ken Doherty**	**79**
(Scotland) Graeme Dott	6

Final
(England) Shaun Murphy	36
(Republic of Ireland) **Ken Doherty**	**71**
