= 1986 Pot Black =

Pot Black 86
Tournament information
- Dates: December 1985 (broadcast weekly, 16 January – 17 April 1986)
- Venue: Pebble Mill Studios
- City: Birmingham
- Country: England
- Organisation: WPBSA
- Format: Non-Ranking event
- Highest break: (England) Jimmy White (106)

Final
- Champion: (England) Jimmy White
- Runner-up: (Canada) Kirk Stevens
- Score: 2–0

The 1986 Pot Black was the eighteenth edition of the professional invitational snooker tournament, and the last of its original run. It took place in December 1985, but was broadcast in 1986. The tournament was held at Pebble Mill Studios in Birmingham, and featured sixteen professional players in a knock-out system. All matches until the semi-final were one-frame shoot-outs, the semi-final was won by aggregate score over two frames, and the final was decided by the best of three frames.

Broadcasts were on BBC2 and started at 22:10 on Thursday 16 January 1986, later than in previous series. David Icke presented, with Ted Lowe as commentator and John Williams as referee.

The only Pot Black debut in this series was that of Patsy Fagan. All the competitors in this series were 1985 World Championship last-16 players. Jimmy White won the event, beating Kirk Stevens 2–0 with a break of 106 in the last frame.

== Main draw ==
Last 16
(Wales) Doug Mountjoy	62
(Republic of Ireland) Patsy Fagan	67
(England) Jimmy White	76
(Wales) Terry Griffiths	47
(Canada) Cliff Thorburn	58
(England) David Taylor	38
(England) Tony Knowles	100
(Australia) Eddie Charlton	13
(England) Steve Davis	45
(Canada) Bill Werbeniuk	65
(Canada) Kirk Stevens	62
(England) Tony Meo	54
(Wales) Ray Reardon	1
(Northern Ireland) Alex Higgins	0
(Northern Ireland) Dennis Taylor	1
(England) John Parrott	0

Quarter-finals
(Republic of Ireland) Patsy Fagan	0
(England) Jimmy White	1
(Canada) Cliff Thorburn	1
(England) Tony Knowles	0
(Canada) Bill Werbeniuk	0
(Canada) Kirk Stevens	1
(Wales) Ray Reardon	0
(Northern Ireland) Dennis Taylor	1

Semi-finals; Aggregate score of 2 frames
(England) Jimmy White	1
(Canada) Cliff Thorburn	0
(Canada) Kirk Stevens	1
(Northern Ireland) Dennis Taylor	0

Final; Best of 3 frames
(England) Jimmy White	2
(Canada) Kirk Stevens	0

Match dates of transmission

Player 1	Player 2	Broadcast Date
(Republic of Ireland) Patsy Fagan	(Wales) Doug Mountjoy	16 January 1986
(Canada) Bill Werbeniuk	(England) Steve Davis	23 January 1986
(England) Jimmy White	(Wales) Terry Griffiths	30 January 1986
(Canada) Kirk Stevens	(England) Tony Meo	6 February 1986
(England) Tony Knowles	(Australia) Eddie Charlton	13 February 1986
(Wales) Ray Reardon	(Northern Ireland) Alex Higgins	20 February 1986
(Canada) Cliff Thorburn	(England) David Taylor	27 February 1986
(Northern Ireland) Dennis Taylor	(England) John Parrott	6 March 1986
(England) Jimmy White	(Republic of Ireland) Patsy Fagan	13 March 1986
(Canada) Kirk Stevens	(Canada) Bill Werbeniuk	27 March 1986
(Canada) Cliff Thorburn	(England) Tony Knowles	29 March 1986
(Northern Ireland) Dennis Taylor	(Wales) Ray Reardon	3 April 1986
(England) Jimmy White	(Canada) Cliff Thorburn	5 April 1986
(Canada) Kirk Stevens	(Northern Ireland) Dennis Taylor	10 April 1986
(England) Jimmy White	(Canada) Kirk Stevens	17 April 1986

== Final ==
Final: Best of 3 frames. Referee: John Williams. Pebble Mill Studios, Birmingham, England, December 1985 (Broadcast 17 April 1986).
Jimmy White; England	2–0	Kirk Stevens; Canada
60–46, 106–21 (106)
106	Highest break	45
1	Century breaks	0
1	50+ breaks	1
