= 1967 World Open Snooker Championship =

Tournament information
- Dates: November 1966 – April 1967
- Venue: Various
- Country: United Kingdom

Final
- Champion: Rex Williams (ENG)
- Runner-up: Fred Davis (ENG)
- Score: 26–25 (Series of match wins)

The 1967 World Open Snooker Championship was a series of 51 matches between Fred Davis and Rex Williams for the title won by Davis at the 1960 World Open Snooker Championship. Despite the name of the competition, Davis and Williams were the only contestants. Williams took the title by winning 26 matches to Davis' 25, a winning margin having been achieved at 26–23.

== Summary ==
Fred Davis had won the 1960 World Open Snooker Championship, which had been held in Australia with eight players competing in a round-robin. Davis and Rex Williams arranged to play a series of 31 matches with the winner taking the title, and with each player taking a fee from each of the match venues. Snooker historian Clive Everton has suggested that the agenda behind the contest was to allow Williams to gain a world snooker title and become more marketable, at a time when he was unlikely to win against the reigning world champion John Pulman. Everton claims that Davis remarked "I had a devil of a job to let him win."

All matches were of five frames. Originally there were going to be 31 matches in the series, but this was later extended to 51.

Davis won the first three matches, before Williams had his first win in the fourth match. These were played in front of capacity crowds at each venue. Williams later levelled at 5–5, with Davis then winning three of the next five matches to lead 8–7 by Christmas 1966. After the resumption of the series in January 1967, Williams won two matches to take the lead for the first time, at 9–8, but then lost the next three to trail 9–11, before winning four in succession to lead 13–11. With the pair each obtaining four wins from the next eight matches, Williams led 17–16. Thirteen matches later, Williams had increased his lead to 25–21, needing only one further win out of the remaining five matches.

Williams reached a winning margin at British Sidac, St. Helens, to win the title at 26–23. Davis won the last two matches to make the final score 26–25. Williams was presented with the trophy by Harold Phillips, Chairman of the Billiards Association and Control Council, after the final match, which was held at Ferranti Recreation, Manchester.

== Known match details ==
Date	No.	Winner	Score	Matches	Venue	Notes	Ref.
November 1966	1.	Davis	3–2	0–1	United Club, Workington	Davis compiled an 89 break.	
November 1966	2.	Davis	3–2	0–2	Heaton Norris Conservative Club, Stockport	Williams had led 2–0.	
November 1966	3.	Davis	3–2	0–3	Wilmslow British Legion		
November 1966	4.	Williams	3–2	1–3	Acregate Labour Club, Preston	Williams won the first three frames.	
December 1966	5.	Davis	4–1	1–4	Boscombe Conservative Club, Bournemouth	Davis compiled an 87 break.	
December 1966	6.	Davis	3–2	1–5	Mackworth Club, Neath	Davis compiled a 103 break, in his second visit to the table.	
December 1966	7.	Williams	3–2	2–5	Crewkerne Conservative Club		
5 December 1966	8.	Williams	4–1	3–5	Moreton Social Club, Birkenhead		
December 1966	9.	Williams	3–2	4–5	Hall Green Home Guard Club, Birmingham		
December 1966	10.	Williams	4–1	5–5	Central Conservative Club, Ashton-under-Lyne		
December 1966	11.	Davis	4–1	5–6	Sleaford Social Club	Davis compiled a break of 89.	
December 1966	12.	Davis	3–2	5–7	Kirkby-in-Ashfield	Williams compiled breaks of 77 and 102.	
December 1966	13.	Williams	4–1	6–7	Lancing British Legion	Williams compiled a break of 87.	
December 1966	14.	Davis	4–1	6–8	Tooting Conservative Club		
December 1966	15.	Davis	3–2	7–8	High Wycombe British Legion	Williams compiled a break of 97 in the deciding frame.	
9 January 1967	16.	Williams	3–2	8–8	James Gibbons Social Club, Pensnett		
11 January 1967	17.	Williams	4–1	9–8	Belmont Conservative Club, Swadlincote		
12 January 1967	18.	Davis	3–2	9–9	Eastwood View Working Men's Club, Rotherham	Davis won on the black ball in the deciding frame.	
13 January 1967	19.	Davis	4–1	9–10	Wellington Tube, Tipton		
16 January 1967	20.	Davis	3–2	9–11	Louth Town and Country Club		
17 January 1967	21.	Williams	3–2	10–11	Ironopolis Men's Club, Middlesbrough		
18 January 1967	22.	Williams	3–2	11–11	Castle Ward Conservative Club, Lenton		
19 January 1967	23.	Williams	3–2	12–11	Retford Conservative Club, Nottingham		
20 January 1967	24.	Williams	3–2	13–11	Nu-Way Sports and Social Club, Droitwich	Williams compiled a break of 109.	
1 February 1967	25.				Elliot Lucas Sports and Social, Cannock		
2 February 1967	26.				Elliot Lucas Sports and Social, Cannock		
3 February 1967	27.				Audco Sports and Social, Newport, Shropshire		
9 February 1967	28.				Parish Hall, Rhabon, near Wrexham		
13 February 1967	29.				Hitchin Conservative Club		
14 February 1967	30.				Fordham British Legion, Ely		
15 February 1967	31.				Maldon Constitutional Club		
16 February 1967	32.				Victoria Billiards Club, Southend		
17 February 1967	33.				Eastbourne Constitutional Club		
23 February 1967	34.				Marconi Athletic, Chelmsford		
24 February 1967	35.				A.C. Delco Sports and Social, Dunstable		
27 February 1967	36.				Port Sunlight Men's Club		
28 February 1967	37.				Grange Town British Legion, Middlesbrough		
	??						
8 March 1967	??	Davis	4–1	19–17	Friendly Societies' Hall, Tunbridge Wells		
	??						
	46.			25–21			
April 1967	47.	Davis	5–0	25–22	Newark Conservative Club		
4 April 1967	48.	Davis	5–0	25–23	Skipton British Legion		
April 1967	49.	Williams	3–2	26–23	British Sidac, St. Helens	Williams achieved a winning margin.	
April 1967	50.	Davis	3–2	26–24	Merthyr Labour Club		
April 1967	51.	Davis	4–1	26–25	Ferranti Recreation, Manchester		
