= Subhash Agarwal =

Indian billiards and snooker player and coach

Subhash Agarwal (born 28 July 1948) is an Indian professional player and coach of English billiards and snooker. A National Snooker Champion of India, he was the runner-up in the 1983 amateur IBSF World Billiards Championship, losing to Michael Ferreira 2744–3933. In 1995 he defeated Peter Gilchrist in the final of the UK Championship, making him the first Indian national to win a ranking event held in the UK. He received the prestigious Arjuna Award in 1983, Agarwal is the coach of the Indian national billiards team, working with Pankaj Advani among others. He is the brother of the late World Amateur snooker champion Om Agarwal, and a protégé of Anglo-Indian champion Wilson Jones. Agarwal's family name is sometimes misspelled "Agrawal".
