= 2006 Pot Black =

Pot Black
Tournament information
- Dates: 2 September 2006
- Venue: Royal Automobile Club
- City: London
- Country: England
- Organisation: WPBSA
- Format: Non-ranking event
- Total prize fund: £40,000
- Winner's share: £10,000
- Highest break: 119 – Mark Williams

Final
- Champion: (Wales) Mark Williams
- Runner-up: (Scotland) John Higgins
- Score: 1–0 (119–13)

The 2006 Pot Black was a professional non-ranking snooker tournament that was held on 2 September 2006 at the Royal Automobile Club in London, England. All matches were played over one frame. Matthew Stevens was the defending champion, but lost in the first round 0–1 (64–70) against John Higgins.

Mark Williams won the final 1–0 (119–13) against John Higgins. During the final Williams compiled a 119 break, the highest in the tournament's history.

== Prize fund ==
The breakdown of prize money for this year is shown below:

- Winner: £10,000
- Runner-up: £6,000
- Semi-final: £4,000
- Quarter-final: £3,500
- Highest break: £2,000
- Total: £40,000

== Main draw ==
Players highlighted in bold are the match winners.

Quarter-finals
(Wales) Matthew Stevens	64
(Scotland) **John Higgins**	**70**
(Scotland) Graeme Dott	20
(England) **Peter Ebdon**	**61**
(England) Shaun Murphy	46
(Wales) **Mark Williams**	**60**
(Scotland) Stephen Hendry	1
(Republic of Ireland) **Ken Doherty**	88'

Semi-finals
(Scotland) **John Higgins**	**81**
(England) Peter Ebdon	0
(Wales) **Mark Williams**	**72**
(Republic of Ireland) Ken Doherty	50

Final
(Scotland) John Higgins	13
(Wales) **Mark Williams**	**119**
