= 1982 Australian Masters =

Professional invitational snooker tournament

Tournament information
- Dates: 7–9 July 1982
- Venue: Channel 10 Television Studios
- City: Sydney
- Country: Australia
- Format: Non-ranking event
- Total prize fund: $100,000
- Highest break: Steve Davis (ENG) 86

Final
- Champion: Steve Davis (ENG)
- Runner-up: Eddie Charlton (AUS)
- Score: 254–100 points

The 1982 Winfield Australian Masters was a professional non-ranking snooker tournament that took place between 7 and 9 July 1982 in the Channel 10 Television Studios in Sydney, Australia. The tournament was sponsored by Winfield and had a total prize fund of $100,000. There were two qualifying groups, played on a round-robin basis, with the top two players from each group progressing to the knockout stage. The semi-finals and final were decided on aggregated points scored: over two frames in the semi-finals, and over three frames in the final. The event was recorded for broadcast on Channel 10, with transmissions starting from 30 August 1982.

Steve Davis won the tournament by defeating Eddie Charlton 254–100 in the final. Davis also made the highest break, 86, in his match against Cliff Thorburn.

== Results ==
Group A (one frame)

Player	Score	Player
Tony Meo (ENG)	11–98	Ray Reardon (WAL)
Alex Higgins (NIR)	50–70	Ian Anderson (AUS)
Tony Meo (ENG)	79–67	Alex Higgins (NIR)
Ray Reardon (WAL)	48–70	Ian Anderson (AUS)
Tony Meo (ENG)	85–38	Ian Anderson (AUS)
Alex Higgins (NIR)	58–54	Ray Reardon (WAL)

Group B (one frame)

Player	Score	Player
John Spencer (ENG)	15–100	Eddie Charlton (AUS)
Steve Davis (ENG)	111–31	Cliff Thorburn (CAN)
John Spencer (ENG)	28–95	Steve Davis (ENG)
Eddie Charlton (AUS)	69–36	Cliff Thorburn (CAN)
John Spencer (ENG)	105–8	Cliff Thorburn (CAN)
Steve Davis (ENG)	4–123	Eddie Charlton (AUS)

Knockout

Semi-finals; Aggregate score over two frames
1	Ian Anderson (AUS)	115
4	Steve Davis (ENG)	119
3	Tony Meo (ENG)	94
2	Eddie Charlton (AUS)	138

Final; Aggregate score over three frames
Steve Davis (ENG)	254
Eddie Charlton (AUS)	100
