= John Virgo =

English snooker player (1946–2026)

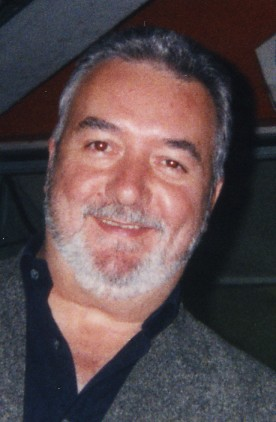
- Virgo in 2003

Personal information
- Nickname: JV
- Born: 4 March 1946 Salford, Lancashire, England
- Died: 4 February 2026 (aged 79) Benalmádena, Andalusia, Spain

Sport
- Country: England
- Sport: Snooker
- Professional: 1976–1994
- Highest ranking: 10 (1979/80)
- Best ranking finish: Semi-final (x4)

John Trevor Virgo (4 March 1946 – 4 February 2026) was an English professional snooker player and broadcaster. After achieving success as an amateur, Virgo turned professional in 1976 at age 30 and won four professional titles during his career, including the 1979 UK Championship, where he defeated the reigning World Champion Terry Griffiths 14–13 in the final. A runner-up at the 1980 Champion of Champions, he was a semi-finalist at the 1979 World Championship and the 1986 British Open. He retired from professional play in 1994.

Virgo had a successful broadcasting career working for the BBC. He was a co-presenter of Big Break alongside Jim Davidson from 1991 to 2002 and worked as a commentator on the BBC's coverage of Triple Crown events from his retirement until shortly before his death. Known for his catchphrases in commentary and his impressions of other players, he was inducted into the World Snooker Tour Hall of Fame in 2023. Virgo died in February 2026 at his home in Spain, aged 79. A special invitational tournament, the 2026 John Virgo Trophy was held in April 2026 as a tribute to his life and work as a snooker player.

== Early life ==
John Trevor Virgo was born on 4 March 1946 at home in Robertson Street, Salford, the youngest child of William, a dockyard crane driver, and his wife Florence, a shop assistant. His mother's family were from the Salford area and his father's family were from Newport, Wales, although his father had been born in Hereford. Virgo had four older siblings, a brother and three sisters. The family lived in a two-up two-down terraced house that had no running water and an outside lavatory.

Virgo first began playing snooker at eight years old when he received a six-by-three-foot snooker table for Christmas. At age 12, he began frequenting a snooker club on Small Street in Salford, despite his father calling it a "den of iniquity" and forbidding him from going there. He attended Ordsall Secondary Modern School, but left school at age 15 to work as a delivery boy at an engineering firm.

== Snooker career ==
=== Amateur ===
Virgo practised at Potters Club in Salford and earned a reputation by winning several big money matches. As an amateur snooker player, he won the National Under-16 Championship in 1962 and the National Under-19 Championship in 1965. In total, he represented England in the amateur championships fifteen times. His first notable appearance in a major tournament was the 1973 American pool tournament for The Indoor League, where he lost in the semi-final. Virgo reached the final of the Pontins Open in 1975 but lost 1–7 to world champion Ray Reardon, despite receiving a 25-point head start per frame. He won the 1976 Coral Pairs Championship with fellow Salford player Paul Medati.

=== Professional ===
Virgo turned professional in 1976 at the age of 30 as one of the youngest players on the circuit at the time. He compiled his first maximum break in the same year against Roy Andrewartha. He reached the semi-finals of the 1977 UK Championship but lost to eventual winner Patsy Fagan 8‍–‍9.

In 1979, Virgo moved south and joined the group of snooker players that Henry West managed. His snooker-playing fortunes peaked in 1979 when he reached the semi-final of the World Championship, losing 12–19 to the eventual runner-up Dennis Taylor. In the 28th frame, Virgo was close to making a maximum break but missed the twelfth black. He won the 1979 UK Championship, which was not a ranking event at the time. En-route to the final, he defeated Tony Meo, Steve Davis and Dennis Taylor. Virgo overcame the reigning world champion Terry Griffiths in the final by 14–13, despite being docked two frames because of a miscommunication regarding the start time of the next session of play and arrived 20 minutes late for the match. His victory was not broadcast as the television cameramen were on strike at the time.

In October 1980, Virgo was runner-up in the Group A bracket of the Champion of Champions tournament at the New London Theatre, losing to Doug Mountjoy. Virgo reached his highest ranking, world number 10, during the 1979–80 season. Virgo would not reach the semi-final of a major professional event until the 1982 Jameson International. He was runner-up at the 1984 Australian Masters and won the inaugural 1984 Professional Snooker League. Virgo produced some of his strongest performances, losing just one out of his 11 matches. The prize for the winner was to be £50,000 and a gold cue, but the sponsor ran out of money during the tournament and Virgo received nothing for his victory.

In 1986, Virgo reached the semi-finals of the British Open, losing 4–9 to Willie Thorne. In 1987, he defeated Steve Davis at the same event, which marked the first time Davis had failed to reach the televised stages of a professional tournament. From 1987 to 1989, Virgo was chairman of the World Professional Billiards and Snooker Association (WPBSA). Virgo ended the 1989–90 season as world number 14, but dropped out of the elite top 16 the following season. In August 1993, Virgo entered the qualifying stages of the 1993 UK Championship in Blackpool. He had struggled to put in the time for practise due to his commitments with Big Break, and his 5–2 defeat to Spencer Dunn led to his decision not to enter the 1994 World Championship.

== Television career ==
As part of his exhibition performances, Virgo performed trick shots and comedic impressions of other snooker players of the day. He was inspired from watching Northern Irish player Jackie Rea do impressions during his time as an amateur player. Virgo debuted his act on television for the first time at the 1982 World Championship, when the BBC television producers and cameraman had time to spare. He developed his routines by incorporating props and at one point, hired a professional scriptwriter to boost his material. Virgo credits his televised routine at the 1984 World Championship that boosted his national profile and increased work on the exhibition circuit.

From 1991 to 2002, Virgo was co-presenter of the snooker-based TV game show Big Break with Jim Davidson. The 30-min show paired three contestants with three tour snooker players in a three-round format to win the contestants prizes. He said his catchphrase "pot as many balls as you can" when asked by Davidson to explain the first round rules. After that round, Virgo presented a trick shot segment, where the losing contestant would try to win a consolation prize by playing a snooker trick shot demonstrated by Virgo.

Virgo was a television snooker commentator, working primarily for the BBC. He made his commentating debut at the 1985 World Championship. In later years, Virgo was known for catchphrases, such as, "Where's the cue ball going?", if he saw the cue ball heading towards a pocket for a possible foul, and "there's always a gap" when players were able to hit a ball that seemed unlikely. On the Talking Snooker podcast in September 2021, Virgo announced that he and his colleague Dennis Taylor were to be dropped by the BBC at the end of that season. It was reported in April 2022 that their time with the BBC would be extended to take in the 2022–23 season, but in late 2022 the BBC production team informed Virgo that he would stay on for the "foreseeable future".

In April 2023, Virgo became the 35th person to be inducted into the World Snooker Tour Hall of Fame. Virgo's final broadcast as a commentator, seventeen days before his death, was during the 2026 Masters final in which Kyren Wilson defeated John Higgins.

== Other activities ==
Virgo bought a two-way share in Jokist, a racehorse, in 1985. The success of Big Break led Virgo to form his own line of snooker waistcoats with manufacturer Piscador. He also had line sold in John Lewis stores.

Virgo released three books. He wrote a tribute to Alex Higgins, titled Let Me Tell You About Alex, which was published in February 2011. His book Amazing Snooker Trick Shots was published in April 2012. An autobiography, titled Say Goodnight, JV based on a catchphrase of his on Big Break was published in 2017.

In 2012, Virgo featured as himself in Nicholas Gleaves' debut radio play Sunk, in which he guides a young man in his dream of becoming a snooker champion to avoid a life of crime, broadcast on BBC Radio 4. Virgo worked with a pool and snooker table company called Liberty Games to create a web-based series of trick shot videos known as the Trick Shot Academy. In 2014, Virgo released a trick shot app, John Virgo's Snooker Trick Shots, available on Apple and Android devices.

Following his death, the inaugural John Virgo Trophy invitational tournament was held on 11–12 April at Goffs in County Kildare, Ireland. It featured four players–Ronnie O'Sullivan, Mark Williams, John Higgins, and Stephen Hendry.

== Personal life and death ==
Virgo suffered from problem gambling during his playing career, especially when his earnings from professional snooker declined after the mid-1980s. He once lost £10,000 in two weeks betting on horse races. He borrowed £200,000 against his mortgage to maintain the appearance of success, but his home in Surrey was later repossessed.

He married three times and had two children. He had a son with his first wife, Susan, but left her in the late 1970s to live with Avril, who became his second wife. They had a daughter before splitting up in 1991. In 2009, he married Rosie (née Ries), a publishing executive. The couple relocated to the Costa del Sol in Spain in 2020 as the warmer climate provided relief to Virgo's longstanding neck injury.

Virgo died from a ruptured aorta in Benalmádena, Spain, on 4 February 2026, aged 79.

Paying tribute to Virgo as an entertainer, Dennis Taylor said: "He had it all".

== Performance and rankings timeline ==
Tournament	1973/ 74	1974/ 75	1975/ 76	1976/ 77	1977/ 78	1978/ 79	1979/ 80	1980/ 81	1981/ 82	1982/ 83	1983/ 84	1984/ 85	1985/ 86	1986/ 87	1987/ 88	1988/ 89	1989/ 90	1990/ 91	1991/ 92	1992/ 93	1993/ 94
Ranking	(Note: He was an amateur.)			(Note: New players on the Main Tour do not have a ranking.)	18	19	10	12	13	19	14	18	19	19	19	15	13	14	31	49	72
Ranking tournaments
Dubai Classic (Note: The event was also called the Dubai Masters (1988/1989))	Tournament Not Held															NR	3R	1R	1R	LQ	A
Grand Prix (Note: The event was also called the Professional Players Tournament (1982/83–1983/84))	Tournament Not Held									SF	2R	2R	1R	2R	2R	1R	2R	1R	1R	LQ	LQ
UK Championship	Tournament Not Held				Non-Ranking Event							LQ	2R	2R	2R	QF	1R	1R	1R	LQ	LQ
European Open	Tournament Not Held															3R	2R	2R	2R	LQ	A
Welsh Open	Tournament Not Held																		2R	LQ	WD
International Open (Note: The event was also called the Goya Matchroom Trophy (1985/1986))	Tournament Not Held								NR	SF	1R	2R	2R	2R	QF	2R	1R	Not Held		1R	WD
Thailand Open (Note: The event was also called the Asian Open (1989/1990–1992/1993))	Tournament Not Held										Non-Ranking Event				Not Held		3R	2R	1R	LQ	A
British Open (Note: The event was also called the British Gold Cup (1979/1980), Yamaha Organs Trophy (1980/1981) and International Masters (1981/1982–1983/1984))	Tournament Not Held						Non-Ranking Event					2R	SF	QF	2R	2R	1R	1R	1R	LQ	WD
World Championship	A	A	A	1R	LQ	SF	2R	1R	2R	1R	1R	1R	1R	1R	1R	2R	2R	1R	LQ	LQ	A
Non-ranking tournaments
The Masters	A	A	A	A	A	A	1R	A	A	1R	1R	A	A	A	A	1R	1R	1R	A	A	A
Irish Masters (Note: The event was also called the Benson & Hedges Ireland Tournament (1974/1975–1976/1977))	A	A	A	A	A	A	A	1R	A	A	A	A	A	A	A	A	A	A	A	A	A
Pontins Professional	A	A	A	A	A	A	W	QF	QF	A	A	QF	A	QF	A	A	A	A	A	A	A
European League (Note: The event was also called the Professional Snooker League (1983/1984) and the Matchroom League (1986/1987 to 1991/1992))	Tournament Not Held										W	Not Held		A	A	A	A	A	A	A	A
Former ranking tournaments
Canadian Masters (Note: The event was also called the Canadian Open (1974/1975–1980/1981))	Not Held		Non-Ranking Event						Tournament Not Held				Non-Ranking			2R	Tournament Not Held				
Hong Kong Open (Note: The event was also called the Australian Masters (1979/1980–1987/1988 & 1995/1996) and Australian Open (1994/1995))	Tournament Not Held						Non-Ranking Event									NH	3R	Tournament Not Held			
Classic	Tournament Not Held						Non-Ranking Event				1R	QF	2R	2R	3R	3R	3R	1R	3R	Not Held	
Strachan Open	Tournament Not Held																		1R	MR	NR
Former non-ranking tournaments
Norwich Union Open	1R	Tournament Not Held																			
Canadian Club Masters	Not Held		QF	Tournament Not Held																	
Canadian Masters	NH	QF	A	SF	A	A	A	A	Tournament Not Held				A	A	A	R	Tournament Not Held]				
Tolly Cobbold Classic	Tournament Not Held					A	SF	A	A	A	A	Tournament Not Held									
Bombay International	Tournament Not Held					A	W	Tournament Not Held													
Champion of Champions	Tournament Not Held					A	NH	F	Tournament Not Held												
International Open	Tournament Not Held								QF	Ranking Event								Not Held		Ranking	
Classic	Tournament Not Held						SF	A	A	1R	Ranking Event									Not Held	
Pontins Brean Sands	Tournament Not Held									SF	Tournament Not Held										
UK Championship	Tournament Not Held				SF	QF	W	2R	1R	QF	1R	Ranking Event									
British Open	Tournament Not Held						RR	RR	2R	LQ	RR	Ranking Event									
New Zealand Masters	Tournament Not Held											1R	Not Held			A	A	Tournament Not Held			
Australian Masters (Note: The event was also called the Hong Kong Open (1989/1990) and Australian Open (1994/1995))	Tournament Not Held						A	A	A	A	A	F	QF	A	A	NH	R	Tournament Not Held			
English Professional Championship	Tournament Not Held							2R	Not Held			QF	QF	2R	2R	1R	Tournament Not Held				
Norwich Union Grand Prix	Tournament Not Held															A	QF	A	Not Held		
World Seniors Championship	Tournament Not Held																		1R	Not Held	

Performance Table Legend
LQ	lost in the qualifying draw	#R	lost in the early rounds of the tournament (WR = Wildcard round, RR = Round robin)	QF	lost in the quarter-finals
SF	lost in the semi-finals	F	lost in the final	W	won the tournament
DNQ	did not qualify for the tournament	A	did not participate in the tournament	WD	withdrew from the tournament

NH / Not Held	means an event was not held.
NR / Non-Ranking Event	means an event is/was no longer a ranking event.
R / Ranking Event	means an event is/was a ranking event.

== Career finals ==
=== Non-ranking finals: 6 (4 titles) ===
Legend
UK Championship (1–0)
Other (3–2)

Outcome	No.	Year	Championship	Opponent in the final	Score	Ref
Winner	1.	1979	UK Championship	(Wales) Terry Griffiths	14–13	
Winner	2.	1980	Bombay International	(Canada) Cliff Thorburn	13–7	
Winner	3.	1980	Pontins Professional	(Wales) Ray Reardon	9–6	
Runner-up	1.	1980	Champion of Champions	(Wales) Doug Mountjoy	8–10	
Winner	4.	1984	Professional Snooker League	(Northern Ireland) Dennis Taylor	Round-Robin	
Runner-up	2.	1984	Australian Masters	(England) Tony Knowles	3–7	

=== Pro-am finals: 1 ===
Outcome	No.	Year	Championship	Opponent in the final	Score	Ref
Runner-up	1.	1975	Pontins Spring Open	(Wales) Ray Reardon	1–7	
