= 1973 Pot Black =

Tournament information
- Dates: Recorded 29 December 1972 – 1 January 1973 (broadcast 13 February – 29 May 1973)
- Venue: Pebble Mill Studios
- City: Birmingham
- Country: England
- Format: Non-ranking event
- Winner's share: £1000
- Highest break: (Australia) Eddie Charlton (110)

Final
- Champion: (Australia) Eddie Charlton
- Runner-up: (England) Rex Williams
- Score: 93–33

The 1973 Pot Black was a professional invitational snooker tournament, which was broadcast in 1973. The tournament was held in the Pebble Mill Studios in Birmingham, and featured eight professional players. All matches were one-frame shoot-outs.

Broadcasts were on BBC2 and started at 21:00 on Tuesday 13 February 1973 The tournament this year was reverted to 8 players. The three ex-winners were in a Pot Black Champions group while the remaining five players were in a League of Champions group. The top two from each group qualified for the semi-finals. Alan Weeks presented the programme with Ted Lowe as commentator and Sydney Lee as referee.

The tournament featured the TV debut of Alex Higgins who beat John Pulman in the first match of the series. Eddie Charlton retained the Pot Black title beating Rex Williams 93–33 shown on 29 May and also made the first century break making 110 against John Spencer which remained a record until 2005.

The winner's trophy was presented by Percy Thrower.

== Main draw ==
=== League of Champions Group ===
Player 1	Score	Player 2	Broadcast Date
(Northern Ireland) Alex Higgins	1–0	(England) John Pulman	13 February 1973
(England) Rex Williams	1–0	(Northern Ireland) Jackie Rea	20 February 1973
(England) Fred Davis	0–1	(England) John Pulman	6 March 1973
(Northern Ireland) Alex Higgins	0–1	(England) Rex Williams	13 March 1973
(England) Fred Davis	1–0	(Northern Ireland) Jackie Rea	27 March 1973
(England) John Pulman	1–0	(England) Rex Williams	3 April 1973
(Northern Ireland) Alex Higgins	0–1	(Northern Ireland) Jackie Rea	10 April 1973
(England) Fred Davis	1–0	(England) Rex Williams	24 April 1973
(Northern Ireland) Jackie Rea	1–0	(England) John Pulman	1 May 1973
(Northern Ireland) Alex Higgins	0–1	(England) Fred Davis	8 May 1973

=== Pot Black Champions Group ===
Player 1	Score	Player 2	Broadcast Date
(England) John Spencer	0–1	(Wales) Ray Reardon	27 February 1973
(England) John Spencer	0–1	(Australia) Eddie Charlton	20 March 1973
(Australia) Eddie Charlton	1–0	(Wales) Ray Reardon	17 April 1973

=== Knockout stage ===
Semi-finals (15 and 22 May 1973)		Final (29 May 1973)
(England) Rex Williams	1
(England) Fred Davis	0	(England) Rex Williams	0
(Wales) Ray Reardon	0	(Australia) Eddie Charlton	1
(Australia) Eddie Charlton	1
