= 1976 World Professional Match-play Championship =

World Professional Match-play Championship
Tournament information
- Dates: 28 November – 11 December 1976
- Venue: Nunawading Basketball Centre
- City: Melbourne
- Country: Australia
- Format: Non-ranking event
- Total prize fund: A$30,000
- Winner's share: A$6,500
- Highest break: Paddy Morgan (AUS), 104

Final
- Champion: Eddie Charlton (AUS)
- Runner-up: Ray Reardon (WAL)
- Score: 31–24

The 1976 World Professional Match-play Championship was a professional invitational snooker tournament held from 28 November to 11 December 1976 at the Nunawading Basketball Centre in Burwood East, Melbourne, Australia. Eddie Charlton, the event's promoter, won the title by defeating Ray Reardon by 31 frames to 24 in the final. The Championship was sanctioned by the World Professional Billiards and Snooker Association, with the event's title causing confusion with the World Snooker Championship in some media reports. The tournament was not repeated.

A World Professional Match-play Championship for professional snooker was staged each year from 1952 to 1957, having been created following a dispute between the Professional Billiards Players' Association (PBPA) and the Billiards Association and Control Council. The PBPA members established a competition, which became known as the World Professional Match-play Championship, as an alternative to the World Snooker Championship. Although at first these were not deemed to be world championships, they were later recognised as editions of the World Snooker Championship. After 1957, the event was discontinued due to a decline in the popularity of snooker. The World Championship was re-instituted on a challenge basis from 1964 to 1968, and as a knock-out format tournament from 1969.

The 1976 tournament, which is not recognised as an edition of the World Snooker Championship, featured sixteen invited players. Alex Higgins was the only one of the top four seeds not to reach the semi-finals. Higgins was defeated 6–13 by Paddy Morgan, who then lost in the deciding frame of his semi-final match against Charlton. Reardon played Graham Miles in the other semi-final, which he won 19–16 after recovering from five frames behind.

== Background ==
A World Professional Match-play Championship for professional snooker was staged each year from 1952 to 1957, having been created following a dispute between the Professional Billiards Players' Association (PBPA) and the Billiards Association and Control Council. The PBPA members established a competition, which became known as the World Professional Match-play Championship, as an alternative to the World Snooker Championship. Although at first these were not deemed to be world championships, they were later recognised as editions of the World Snooker Championship. After 1957, the event was discontinued due to a decline in the popularity of snooker.

After this, there were no world championship matches until professional Rex Williams gained agreement from the BACC that the world championship would be staged on a challenge basis, with defending World Professional Match-play Championship Pulman featuring in the first match. Pulman retained the title in several challenges from 1964 to 1968. From 1969, the World Snooker Championship we re-established by the Imperial Tobacco Company as a knock-out format tournament, using their "Players No. 6" brand.

In 1976, Eddie Charlton gained the recognition of the World Professional Billiards and Snooker Association (WPBSA) for a World Professional Match-play Championship to be held in Australia, promoted by him. The tournament was staged from 28 November to 11 December 1976, at the Nunawading Basketball Centre in Burwood East, Melbourne, Australia, with 16 invited players participating, as an event distinct from the World Championship. John Spencer declined to participate as he was dissatisfied with how the 1975 World Snooker Championship had been conducted by Charlton's promotions company. Clive Everton, editor of Snooker Scene magazine, criticised the WPBSA's decision to approve a tournament with a name that could be confused with the World Snooker Championship, and the decision to include lower-ranked Australian players rather than higher ranked players. Ray Reardon was the top seed, with Alex Higgins second.

On two further occasions after 1976, the WPBSA sanctioned the staging of the tournament, but it did not take place on either of them due to problems with organising the event. The tournament is recognised in Ian Morrison's Hamlyn Encyclopedia of Snooker (1987) as part of the same series as the World Professional Match-play Championship, whilst snooker statistician Chris Turner views them, and the later World Matchplay events as distinct from each other despite the similar titles.

=== Prize money ===
Prize money was awarded as follows:

- First round losers: A$1,000
- Quarter-finals: A$1,750
- Semi-Finals: A$2,500
- Runner-up: A$3,500
- Winner: A$6,500
- Total: A$30,000

== Summary ==
The first round matches commenced on 25 November, and were contested over 25 frames, finishing on 2 December. Three of the Australian professionals were comprehensively defeated, with Reardon eliminating Ron Mares 13–1 (21–4 after dead frames), Charlton defeating Lou Condo by the same margin (and 17–1 after dead frames), and Higgins whitewashing Dennis Wheelwright 13–0 (16–9 after dead frames). Perrie Mans achieved a winning margin at 13–6 against John Dunning, and the pair split to remaining dead frames for a final scoreline of 16–9. Graham Miles defeated Jim Meadowcroft 13–5, increasing his margin to 18–7 after dead frames.

Dennis Taylor led Paddy Morgan, the Australian national English billiards champion, 4–2 and 9–6, before Morgan won three consecutive frames to equalise at level at 9–9. Taylor took the following two frames to lead 12–10, but Morgan qualified for the quarter-finals by completing another three-frame run. Cliff Thorburn, facing Gary Owen, had difficulties with the joint of his two-piece cue stick. Owen led 4–2 and 12–6 before securing a win at 13–6. Williams led Bill Werbeniuk 11–7, before Werbeniuk won six successive frames for a 13–11 victory.

The quarter-final round was held from 3 to 4 December, with matches played over 25 frames. Having led Owen 11–7, Reardon won 13–9, and added the three dead frames to finish at 16–9. Charlton defeated Mans 13–8 after they had been level at 7–7, and won all the dead frames for 17–8. Miles defeated Werbeniuk 13–11 after they had been tied at 11–11. They did not play the scheduled dead frame. Morgan made a break of 104, consisting of thirteen reds and blacks, as he built a 12–6 lead against Higgins, and then won 13–6, with each of the pair winning three dead frames to leave the final score 16–9. Higgins was the only one of the top four seeds not to reach the semi-finals.

The semi-finals took place from 5 to 7 December, with both matches across 37 frames. Morgan led Charlton 16–14 at the start of their final session, and increased this to 17–14 before Charlton won the next three frames to equalise. Morgan then regained a lead at 18–17, but Charlton took the following two frames to progress to the final after the deciding frame, 19–18. Reardon and Miles were level at 15–15, before Reardon won 19–16. Miles had been leading 10–5, but lost eight of the following nine frames.

The final was played from 8 to 11 December over 61 frames. Charlton established a 5–1 lead during the first session, after winning each of the first five frames. and later led 10–8 and 13–11. From 15 to 15, Charlton added four of the six frames from each of the next two session, for 23–19. From two frames ahead, 25–23, at the start of the penultimate session, Charlton took five of the session's six frames, to increase his advantage to 30–24 going into the last session. Charlton won the title 31–24 by clearing the colours after Reardon had failed an attempt to pot the black ball.

Reardon congratulated Charlton after the match, saying that he was a worthy winner, whereas Reardon himself had "played like a loser", adding "In fact I didn't really deserve to get to the final at all. I was almost relieved to lose and I was certainly glad when it was over." After winning the title, Charlton was erroneously reported as being "world champion" by Grandstand, World of Sport and several newspapers. The highest break of the tournament was 104, made by Morgan.

== Main draw ==
Results for the tournament are shown below. Numbers in parentheses indicate seedings.

Last 16; Best of 25 frames
1	Ray Reardon (WAL)	13
Ron Mares (AUS)	1
8	Gary Owen (WAL)	13
Cliff Thorburn (CAN)	6
5	Rex Williams (ENG)	11
Bill Werbeniuk (CAN)	13
4	Graham Miles (ENG)	13
Jim Meadowcroft (ENG)	5
3	Eddie Charlton (AUS)	13
Lou Condo (AUS)	1
6	Perrie Mans (RSA)	13
John Dunning (ENG)	6
7	Dennis Taylor (NIR)	12
Paddy Morgan (AUS)	13
2	Alex Higgins (NIR)	13
Dennis Wheelwright (AUS)	0

Quarter-finals; Best of 25 frames
1	(Wales) Ray Reardon	13
8	(Wales) Gary Owen	9
(Canada) Bill Werbeniuk	11
4	(England) Graham Miles	13
3	(Australia) Eddie Charlton	13
6	(South Africa) Perrie Mans	8
(Australia) Paddy Morgan	13
2	(Northern Ireland) Alex Higgins	6

Semi-finals; Best of 37 frames
1	(Wales) Ray Reardon	19
4	(England) Graham Miles	16
3	(Australia) Eddie Charlton	19
(Australia) Paddy Morgan	18

Final; Best of 61 frames
1	(Wales) Ray Reardon	24
3	(Australia) Eddie Charlton	31
