= 1979 South African Professional Championship =

South African Professional Championship
Tournament information
- Dates: August 1979
- Country: South Africa
- Organisation: WPBSA
- Format: Non-Ranking event

Final
- Champion: Derek Mienie
- Runner-up: Jimmy van Rensberg
- Score: 9–6

The 1979 South African Professional Championship was a non-ranking snooker tournament, which took place in August 1979. The tournament featured five exclusively South African players - Derek Mienie, Jimmy van Rensberg, Mannie Francisco, Peter Francisco and the incumbent champion, Perrie Mans.

Mienie won the title, beating van Rensberg 9–6 in the final.

== Qualifying ==
A first-round match was played between Mienie and Mannie Francisco, to determine who would advance to the semi-finals to play Mans, who was seeded through to this stage.

- Derek Mienie 9–3 Mannie Francisco

== Main draw ==
Semi-finals; Best of 17 frames
Derek Mienie	9
Perrie Mans	3
Jimmy van Rensberg	9
Silvino Francisco	7

Final; Best of 17 frames
Derek Mienie	9
Jimmy van Rensberg	6
