= 1977 Pot Black =

Tournament information
- Dates: Recorded late December 1976 (broadcast 7 January – 22 April 1977)
- Venue: Pebble Mill Studios
- City: Birmingham
- Country: England
- Format: Non-ranking event
- Winner's share: £1000
- Highest break: (South Africa) Perrie Mans (59)

Final
- Champion: (South Africa) Perrie Mans
- Runner-up: (Wales) Doug Mountjoy
- Score: 90–21

The 1977 Pot Black was a professional invitational snooker tournament, which was held in the Pebble Mill Studios in Birmingham, and this year, the tournament expanded from 8 to 12 players. All matches were one-frame shoot-outs.

Broadcasts were on BBC2 and started at 21:00 on Friday 7 January 1977 Alan Weeks presented the programme with Ted Lowe as commentator and Sydney Lee as referee.

With 12 players now competing in this series, the round robin format has now become 4 groups of 3 players. The two debutants Perrie Mans and Doug Mountjoy faced each other in the final which Mans won 90–21.

== Main draw ==
The draw for the group stages was done by Denis Howell, the Minister of Sport and shown before the first match.

=== Group 1 ===
| Player 1 | Score | Player 2 | Broadcast Date |
|---|---|---|---|
| (Australia) Eddie Charlton | 1–0 | (England) Rex Williams | 7 January 1977 |
| (Canada) Cliff Thorburn | 1–0 | (England) Rex Williams | 4 February 1977 |
| (Australia) Eddie Charlton | 0–1 | (Canada) Cliff Thorburn | 4 March 1977 |

=== Group 2 ===
| Player 1 | Score | Player 2 | Broadcast Date |
|---|---|---|---|
| (England) John Spencer | 0–1 | (Wales) Doug Mountjoy | 14 January 1977 |
| (Wales) Doug Mountjoy | 1–0 | (England) John Pulman | 11 February 1977 |
| (England) John Spencer | 0–1 | (England) John Pulman | 11 March 1977 |

=== Group 3 ===
| Player 1 | Score | Player 2 | Broadcast Date |
|---|---|---|---|
| (England) Fred Davis | 1–0 | (Wales) Ray Reardon | 21 January 1977 |
| (South Africa) Perrie Mans | 1–0 | (England) Fred Davis | 18 February 1977 |
| (Wales) Ray Reardon | 0–1 | (South Africa) Perrie Mans | 18 March 1977 |

=== Group 4 ===
| Player 1 | Score | Player 2 | Broadcast Date |
|---|---|---|---|
| (England) Graham Miles | 1–0 | (Northern Ireland) Dennis Taylor | 28 January 1977 |
| (England) Willie Thorne | 1–0 | (Northern Ireland) Dennis Taylor | 25 February 1977 |
| (England) Graham Miles | 0–1 | (England) Willie Thorne | 25 March 1977 |

=== Knockout stage ===
Semi-finals (1 and 8 April 1977)
(Canada) Cliff Thorburn | 0
(Wales) Doug Mountjoy | 1
(South Africa) Perrie Mans | 1
(England) Willie Thorne | 0

Final (22 April 1977)
(Wales) Doug Mountjoy | 0
(South Africa) Perrie Mans | 1
3rd place Play-off (15 April 1977)
(Canada) Cliff Thorburn | 1
(England) Willie Thorne | 0
