= 1975 Australian Professional Championship =

Australian Professional Championship
Tournament information
- Dates: August 1975
- Venue: Wagga RSL Club
- City: Wagga Wagga
- Country: Australia
- Organisation: WPBSA
- Format: Non-ranking event

Final
- Champion: Eddie Charlton
- Runner-up: Dennis Wheelwright
- Score: 31–10

The 1975 Australian Professional Championship was a professional non-ranking snooker tournament, which took place in August 1975.

Eddie Charlton won the tournament defeating Dennis Wheelwright 31–10 in the final.

== Main draw ==
Quarter-finals; Best of 21 frames		Semi-finals; Best of 37 frames		Final; Best of 61 frames
		Eddie Charlton	19
Jim Charlton	11	Jim Charlton	9
Phillip Tarrant	8			Eddie Charlton	31
Dennis Wheelwright	11			Dennis Wheelwright	10
Lou Condo	4	Dennis Wheelwright	19
		Ron Mares	15
