= 1984 Professional Snooker League =

Professional Snooker League
Tournament information
- Dates: 11 November 1983 – 14 April 1984
- Organisation: WPBSA
- Format: Non-ranking event

Final
- Champion: (England) John Virgo
- Runner-up: (Northern Ireland) Dennis Taylor
- Score: Round-Robin

The 1984 Senator Windows Professional Snooker League was a professional non-ranking snooker tournament that was played from November 1983 to April 1984.

John Virgo topped the table and won the tournament. Kirk Stevens withdrew during the tournament, leaving some matches unplayed. Due to financial issues, the tournament was not played again until the format was revived in 1987 by Matchroom Sport.

== League table ==
Ranking		(England) VIR	(Northern Ireland) TAY	(Australia) CHA	(Wales) MOU	(Northern Ireland) HIG	(England) SPE	(England) WHI	(England) KNO	(Canada) WER	(Wales) REA	(England) TAY	Frame W-L	Match W-D-L	Pts
Winner	John Virgo	x	6	3	5	6	5	6	6	8	6	6	57–43	7–2–1	16
Runner-up	Dennis Taylor	4	x	8	6	4	7	7	5	6	7	7	62–38	7–1–2	15
3	Eddie Charlton	7	2	x	6	3	7	6	8	5	6	6	56–44	7–1–2	15
4	Alex Higgins	4	6	7	6	x	4	4	5	7	5	5	53–47	4–3–3	11
5	Doug Mountjoy	5	4	4	x	4	2	7	7	7	5	9	54–46	4–2–4	10
6	Tony Knowles	4	5	2	3	5	6	5	x	7	5	6	48–52	3–4–3	10
7	John Spencer	5	3	3	8	6	x	5	4	7	5	4	49–51	3–3–4	9
8	Jimmy White	4	3	4	3	6	5	x	5	4	6	6	46–54	3–2–5	8
9	Ray Reardon	4	3	4	5	5	5	4	5	6	x	5	46–54	1–5–4	7
10	Bill Werbeniuk	2	4	5	3	3	3	6	3	x	4	6	39–61	2–1–7	5
11	David Taylor	4	3	4	1	5	6	4	4	4	5	x	40–60	1–2–7	4

If points were level then most draws, then most frames won determined their positions. If two players had an identical record then the result in their match determined their positions. If that ended 4–4 then the player who got to four first was higher. Stevens did not complete his matches and matches involving him were removed from consideration for the league table.

Match results

- Tony Knowles 7–3 Bill Werbeniuk
- John Spencer 5–5 Jimmy White
- Eddie Charlton 5–5 Bill Werbeniuk
- Tony Knowles 6–4 David Taylor
- John Spencer 6–4 Kirk Stevens
- Bill Werbeniuk 6–4 David Taylor
- Eddie Charlton 6–4 Doug Mountjoy
- Ray Reardon 5–5 John Spencer
- Ray Reardon 5–5 David Taylor
- Dennis Taylor 6–4 Doug Mountjoy
- John Virgo 6–4 David Taylor
- Jimmy White 6–4 Kirk Stevens
- Dennis Taylor 8–2 Eddie Charlton
- Eddie Charlton 6–4 Ray Reardon
- Eddie Charlton 7–3 John Spencer
- Alex Higgins 5–5 Tony Knowles
- Alex Higgins 6–4 Doug Mountjoy
- Tony Knowles 5–5 Ray Reardon
- Tony Knowles 5–5 Dennis Taylor
- Doug Mountjoy 5–5 Ray Reardon
- Doug Mountjoy 7–3 Kirk Stevens
- John Spencer 6–4 Alex Higgins
- John Spencer 7–3 Bill Werbeniuk
- John Spencer 8–2 Doug Mountjoy
- Kirk Stevens 6–4 Tony Knowles
- Kirk Stevens 6–4 Alex Higgins
- David Taylor 6–4 John Spencer
- Dennis Taylor 6–4 Bill Werbeniuk
- Dennis Taylor 7–3 David Taylor
- John Virgo 6–4 Alex Higgins
- John Virgo 6–4 Jimmy White
- John Virgo 6–4 Ray Reardon
- John Virgo 6–4 Kirk Stevens
- Bill Werbeniuk 6–4 Jimmy White
- Jimmy White 6–4 David Taylor
- Eddie Charlton 6–4 Jimmy White
- Eddie Charlton 6–4 David Taylor
- Eddie Charlton 7–3 John Virgo
- Eddie Charlton 8–2 Tony Knowles
- Alex Higgins 5–5 David Taylor
- Doug Mountjoy 7–3 Bill Werbeniuk
- Doug Mountjoy 9–1 David Taylor
- John Spencer 5–5 John Virgo
- Dennis Taylor 8–2 Kirk Stevens
- John Virgo 6–4 Dennis Taylor
- John Virgo 8–2 Bill Werbeniuk
- Jimmy White 6–4 Ray Reardon
- Jimmy White 6–4 Alex Higgins
- Alex Higgins 6–4 Dennis Taylor
- Alex Higgins 7–3 Bill Werbeniuk
- Tony Knowles 5–5 Jimmy White
- Doug Mountjoy 7–3 Jimmy White
- Doug Mountjoy 7–3 Tony Knowles
- Dennis Taylor 7–3 John Spencer
- Alex Higgins 5–5 Ray Reardon
- Alex Higgins 7–3 Eddie Charlton
- Tony Knowles 6–4 John Spencer
- Doug Mountjoy 5–5 John Virgo
- Ray Reardon 6–4 Bill Werbeniuk
- Kirk Stevens *–* Eddie Charlton
- Kirk Stevens *–* Ray Reardon
- Kirk Stevens *–* David Taylor
- Kirk Stevens *–* Bill Werbeniuk
- Dennis Taylor 7–3 Jimmy White
- Dennis Taylor 7–3 Ray Reardon
- John Virgo 6–4 Tony Knowles
