= 1981 Pot Black =

Snooker tournament

Pot Black 81
Tournament information
- Dates: 28–31 December 1980 (Broadcast 30 December 1980 – 31 March 1981)
- Venue: Pebble Mill Studios
- City: Birmingham
- Country: England
- Format: Non-Ranking event
- Winner's share: £2,500
- Highest break: (Canada) Kirk Stevens (79)

Final
- Champion: (Canada) Cliff Thorburn
- Runner-up: (Canada) Jim Wych
- Score: 2–0

The 1981 Pot Black was a professional invitational snooker tournament, which was held between 28 and 31 December 1980 in the Pebble Mill Studios in Birmingham. 8 players were competing in 2 four player groups. The matches are one-frame shoot-outs in the group stages, 2 frame aggregate scores in the semi-finals and the best of 3 frames in the final.

Broadcasts were on BBC2 and started at 21:00 on Tuesday 30 December 1980 Alan Weeks presented the programme with Ted Lowe as commentator and top referee John Williams replaced Sydney Lee after 13 years after Lee retired to ill health.

First time players this year are Canadians Kirk Stevens and Jim Wych. The latter made the final against fellow Canadian Cliff Thorburn before losing 0–2.

== Main draw ==
=== Group 1 ===
Player 1	Score	Player 2	Broadcast Date
(Wales) Ray Reardon	1–0	(Canada) Cliff Thorburn	30 December 1980
(Canada) Kirk Stevens	1–0	(England) Steve Davis	13 January 1981
(Canada) Cliff Thorburn	1–0	(Canada) Kirk Stevens	27 January 1981
(Wales) Ray Reardon	1–0	(England) Steve Davis	10 February 1981
(Canada) Cliff Thorburn	1–0	(England) Steve Davis	24 February 1981
(Wales) Ray Reardon	1–0	(Canada) Kirk Stevens	3 March 1981

=== Group 2 ===
Player 1	Score	Player 2	Broadcast Date
(Australia) Eddie Charlton	1–0	(Northern Ireland) Alex Higgins	6 January 1981
(Canada) Jim Wych	0–1	(England) David Taylor	20 January 1981
(Australia) Eddie Charlton	0–1	(Canada) Jim Wych	3 February 1981
(Northern Ireland) Alex Higgins	1–0	(England) David Taylor	17 February 1981
(Australia) Eddie Charlton	1–0	(England) David Taylor	24 February 1981
(Northern Ireland) Alex Higgins	0–1	(Canada) Jim Wych	3 March 1981

=== Knockout stage ===
Semi-finals (10 and 17 March 1981)
(Wales) Ray Reardon	0
(Canada) Jim Wych	1
(Australia) Eddie Charlton	0
(Canada) Cliff Thorburn	1

Final (31 March 1981)
(Canada) Jim Wych	0
(Canada) Cliff Thorburn	2
3rd place Play-off (24 March 1981)
(Wales) Ray Reardon	1
(Australia) Eddie Charlton	0
