= 1977 Australian Professional Championship =

Australian Professional Championship
Tournament information
- Dates: September 1977
- Venue: Golden Bowl Sports Centre
- City: Melbourne
- Country: Australia
- Organisation: WPBSA
- Format: Non-ranking event

Final
- Champion: Eddie Charlton
- Runner-up: Paddy Morgan
- Score: 25–21

The 1977 Australian Professional Championship was a professional non-ranking snooker tournament, which took place in September 1977.

Eddie Charlton won the tournament defeating Paddy Morgan 25–21 in the final.

== Main draw ==
Semi-finals; Best of 37 frames		Final; Best of 11 frames
Eddie Charlton	19
Warren Simpson	6	Eddie Charlton	25
Paddy Morgan	19	Paddy Morgan	21
Philip Tarrant	13
