= South African Professional Championship =

Professional snooker tournament

Tournament information
- Country: South Africa
- Established: 1948
- Format: Non-ranking event
- Final year: 1989
- Final champion: (South Africa) Perrie Mans

The South African Professional Championship was a professional snooker tournament which was open only for South African players.

== History ==
South Africa held a professional championship beginning in 1948. As with Australia it was originally held as a challenge match until 1984 (the only exception to this was 1979, when five players competed), when the WPBSA offered a subsidy of £1,000 per man to any country holding a national professional championship. This subsidy ended in 1988/1989 after which date most national championships were discontinued, with Perrie Mans winning the final edition of the tournament.

== Winners ==
Year	Winner	Runner-up	Final score	Venue	Season
Challenge matches
1948–1950	Peter Mans	various challenges	n/a		
1950–1965	Fred Van Rensburg	various challenges	n/a		
1965–1977	Perrie Mans	various challenges	n/a		
1978	Perrie Mans	Silvino Francisco	9–5		1978/79
Knockout tournament
1979	Derek Mienie	Jimmy van Rensberg	9–6		1979/80
Challenge matches
1980–1984	Perrie Mans	various challenges	n/a		
Knockout tournaments
1984	Jimmy van Rensberg	Perrie Mans	10–7	MOTHS Club, Johannesburg	1984/85
1986	Silvino Francisco	Francois Ellis	9–1	Johannesburg	1986/87
1988	Francois Ellis	Jimmy van Rensberg	9–4	Germiston	1987/88
1989	Perrie Mans	Robbie Grace	8–5	Johannesburg	1988/89
