= 1982 Pot Black =

Pot Black 82
Tournament information
- Dates: 28–31 December 1981 (Broadcast 5 January – 20 April 1982)
- Venue: Pebble Mill Studios
- City: Birmingham
- Country: England
- Format: Non-Ranking event
- Winner's share: £2,500
- Highest break: (Australia) Eddie Charlton (98)

Final
- Champion: (England) Steve Davis
- Runner-up: (Australia) Eddie Charlton
- Score: 2–0

The 1982 Pot Black was a professional invitational snooker tournament, which was held between 28 and 31 December 1981 in the Pebble Mill Studios in Birmingham. 8 players were competing in 2 four player groups. The matches are one-frame shoot-outs in the group stages, 2 frame aggregate scores in the semi-finals and the best of 3 frames in the final.

Broadcasts were on BBC2 and started at 21:00 on Tuesday 5 January 1982 Alan Weeks presented the programme with Ted Lowe as commentator and John Williams as referee.

World snooker champion Steve Davis won his first Pot Black title beating show veteran Eddie Charlton 2–0.

== Main draw ==
=== Group 1 ===
Player 1	Score	Player 2	Broadcast Date
(Canada) Cliff Thorburn	1–0	(Wales) Doug Mountjoy	5 January 1982
(Northern Ireland) Alex Higgins	0–1	(England) David Taylor	19 January 1982
(Canada) Cliff Thorburn	77–57	(England) David Taylor	2 February 1982
(Wales) Doug Mountjoy	1–0	(Northern Ireland) Alex Higgins	16 February 1982
(Wales) Doug Mountjoy	1–0	(England) David Taylor	2 March 1982
(Canada) Cliff Thorburn	39–81	(Northern Ireland) Alex Higgins	16 March 1982

=== Group 2 ===
Player 1	Score	Player 2	Broadcast Date
(Australia) Eddie Charlton	1–0	(Wales) Ray Reardon	12 January 1982
(England) Steve Davis	1–0	(Northern Ireland) Dennis Taylor	26 January 1982
(Australia) Eddie Charlton	1–0	(Northern Ireland) Dennis Taylor	9 February 1982
(Wales) Ray Reardon	1–0	(England) Steve Davis	23 February 1982
(Wales) Ray Reardon	1–0	(Northern Ireland) Dennis Taylor	9 March 1982
(England) Steve Davis	76–30	(Australia) Eddie Charlton	23 March 1982

=== Knockout stage ===
Semi-finals (30 March and 6 April 1982)
(Wales) Doug Mountjoy	0
(Australia) Eddie Charlton	1
(England) Steve Davis	113
(Canada) Cliff Thorburn	24

Final (20 April 1982)
(Australia) Eddie Charlton	0
(England) Steve Davis	2
3rd place Play-off (13 April 1982)
(Wales) Doug Mountjoy	1
(Canada) Cliff Thorburn	0
