= 1980 Bombay International =

Bombay International
Tournament information
- Dates: 2–12 February 1980
- Venue: Bombay Gymkhana
- City: Bombay
- Country: India
- Organisation: WPBSA
- Format: Non-ranking event
- Winner's share: £3,000

Final
- Champion: (England) John Virgo
- Runner-up: (Canada) Cliff Thorburn
- Score: 13–7

The 1980 Gaware Paints Bombay International was a professional invitational snooker tournament held in February 1980 in Bombay (modern-day Mumbai), India.

In a slight tweak to the previous season, eight professionals played in a round-robin format of three matches each. Four players progressed to the knockout stages, with John Virgo winning the tournament by defeating Cliff Thorburn 13–7 in the final.

== Main draw ==
=== Round-robin ===
Player 1	Score	Player 2
(England) Steve Davis	6–0	(Wales) Doug Mountjoy
(England) Steve Davis	6–0	(Canada) Kirk Stevens
(Wales) Doug Mountjoy	6–2	(Canada) Kirk Stevens
(India) Arvind Savur	6–3	(Northern Ireland) Dennis Taylor
(England) John Spencer	6–3	(Wales) Doug Mountjoy
(England) John Spencer	6–4	(Canada) Kirk Stevens
(England) John Spencer	6–4	(England) Steve Davis
(Canada) Cliff Thorburn	6–1	(England) John Virgo
(Canada) Cliff Thorburn	6–4	(Northern Ireland) Dennis Taylor
(Canada) Cliff Thorburn	6–5	(India) Arvind Savur
(England) John Virgo	6–1	(India) Arvind Savur
(England) John Virgo	6–2	(Northern Ireland) Dennis Taylor

=== Knockout stage ===
Semi-finals; Best of 15 frames
(England) John Virgo	8
(England) John Spencer	6
(Canada) Cliff Thorburn	8
(England) Steve Davis	5

Final; Best of 25 frames
(England) John Virgo	13
(Canada) Cliff Thorburn	7
