= Liberty Games =

British retailer

- Company type: Trading Entity
- Industry: Games retail
- Founded: Surbiton, UK (2004)
- Headquarters: Epsom, UK
- Parent: Majestic Leisure
- Website: libertygames.co.uk

Liberty Games is a UK-based retailer, distributor, and designer of games room equipment located in Epsom, England. The company was first founded in 1989 as "Liberty Leisure", renting out equipment to various establishments in England. In 2001, it switched to manufacturing gaming products and changed to its current name after Liberty Leisure was sold. It is now incorporated under the name of Majestic Leisure Ltd.

Their products include pool tables, snooker tables, table tennis tables, pinball machines, dartboards, casino tables, driving simulators, slot machines, football tables, and multi-game tables. They also manufacture retro products, including old-fashioned jukeboxes and old-school arcade machines. Liberty Games products are commonly found in liquor stores, supermarkets, and restaurants around the United Kingdom.

Popular products of theirs include an Internet meme-themed pinball machine entitled "Meme Ball" and a customisable arcade machine.

Liberty Games have supplied products to television shows such as Big Brother UK and Saturday Kitchen.

Liberty Games were official sponsors of the British Foosball Association for 2012/2013.
