= 1960 World Open Snooker Championship =

Tournament information
- Dates: 6–17 July 1960
- Venue: Science Hall, Exhibition Grounds
- City: Brisbane
- Country: Australia
- Format: Round-robin
- Winner's share: £750
- Highest break: Fred Davis (ENG), 123

Final
- Champion: Fred Davis (ENG)
- Runner-up: Kevin Burles (AUS)

The 1960 World Open Snooker Championship was a Round-robin snooker tournament held at the Science Hall, Exhibition Grounds, Brisbane, from 6 to 17 July 1960. Fred Davis was the champion, winning all seven of his matches. The tournament received press coverage under several different names, including "World Championship", "World Professional Tournament" and "World Snooker Tournament." The tournament was organised by Cecil Klingner, the president of the Queensland Snooker Association, and was sanctioned by the Billiards Association and Control Council. All matches were the best of nine frames.

In his opening match, against Frank Harris, Davis compiled a break of 123, which at the time the highest ever recorded in Australia, and remained the highest of the tournament. His later break of 102 in the tournament was the second century break ever scored in competition in Australia. During his visit to Australia he also made a 103 break during an exhibition match, that was broadcast on 18 July 1960 on the ABN show Sports Cavalcade. Davis received £750 as champion.

Kevin Burles defeated Frank Harris 5–2 in a play-off for second place.

== Final table ==
Pos.	Player	P	W	L	Frames	Av. Pts.	Agg. Pts.	Top Breaks
1	Fred Davis (ENG)	7	7	0	35–11	505	3,535	123, 102,80
2	Kevin Burles (AUS)	7	5	2	27–24	385	2,700	46, 46, 42
3	Frank Harris (AUS)	7	5	2	29–21	376	26,637	58, 49, 40
4	Freddie van Rensberg (RSA)	7	3	4	29–30	452	3,166	70, 68, 52
5	Norman Squire (AUS)	7	3	4	25–27	390	2,733	99, 75, 62
6	Warren Simpson (AUS)	7	3	4	20–28	345	2,415	52, 47, 44
7	Clark McConachy (NZL)	7	2	5	26–28	303	2,287	87, 73, 64
8	Wilson Jones (IND)	7	0	7	13–35	277	1,945	43, 42, 38

== Match results ==
Match winners are shown in bold.

Player	Score	Player
Fred Davis (ENG)	**5**–0	Frank Harris (AUS)
Fred Davis (ENG)	**5**–0	Kevin Burles (AUS)
Frank Harris (AUS)	**5**–4	Clark McConachy (NZL)
Norman Squire (AUS)	**5**–3	Wilson Jones (IND)
Fred Davis (ENG)	**5**–4	Freddie van Rensberg (RSA)
Clark McConachy (NZL)	**5**–0	Wilson Jones (IND)
Kevin Burles (AUS)	**5**–4	Frank Harris (AUS)
Fred Davis (ENG)	**5**–0	Warren Simpson (AUS)
Warren Simpson (AUS)	**5**–0	Wilson Jones (IND)
Frank Harris (AUS)	**5**–2	Freddie van Rensberg (RSA)
Clark McConachy (NZL)	**5**–3	Norman Squire (AUS)
Fred Davis (ENG)	**5**–2	Norman Squire (AUS)
Fred Davis (ENG)	**5**–3	Clark McConachy (NZL)
Fred Davis (ENG)	**5**–2	Wilson Jones (IND)
Kevin Burles (AUS)	**5**–4	Freddie van Rensberg (RSA)
Norman Squire (AUS)	**5**–2	Kevin Burles (AUS)
Kevin Burles (AUS)	**5**–1	Warren Simpson (AUS)
Kevin Burles (AUS)	**5**–1	Clark McConachy (NZL)
Kevin Burles (AUS)	**5**–3	Wilson Jones (IND)
Frank Harris (AUS)	**5**–1	Norman Squire (AUS)
Frank Harris (AUS)	**5**–2	Warren Simpson (AUS)
Frank Harris (AUS)	**5**–2	Wilson Jones (IND)
Freddie van Rensberg (RSA)	**5**–4	Norman Squire (AUS)
Warren Simpson (AUS)	**5**–4	Freddie van Rensberg (RSA)
Freddie van Rensberg (RSA)	**5**–3	Clark McConachy (NZL)
Freddie van Rensberg (RSA)	**5**–3	Wilson Jones (IND)
Norman Squire (AUS)	**5**–2	Warren Simpson (AUS)
Warren Simpson (AUS)	**5**–4	Clark McConachy (NZL)
