= Wilson Jones (billiards player) =

Indian billiards player

- Born: 2 May 1922; Pune, Bombay Presidency, British India
- Died: 4 October 2003 (aged 81); Mumbai
- Sport country: India
- IBSF World Billiards Champion: 1958, 1964

Wilson Lionel Garton-Jones (2 May 1922 – 4 October 2003) was a professional player of English billiards from India. Jones, a dominant national amateur champion for more than a decade, won the amateur world championship twice, in 1958 and 1964. He was awarded the Arjuna Award in 1963, the Padma Shri Award in 1965, and the Dronacharya Award in 1996. He was the first Indian to be a World champion in any sport.

== Early life and education ==
Jones, an Anglo-Indian, was born in Pune in Maharashtra, and studied at Bishop High School and St. Vincent's High School, before joining the War Service in 1939. Jones appeared in the national championship for the first time in 1947. In 1950, he won his first national title, defeating T. A. Selvaraj in the final. During the next sixteen years, he won the amateur National Billiards Championship of Indian twelve times. He won both the national billiards and snooker titles in 1952 and 1954.

== World championship attempts ==
Jones' first World Billiards Championship was in London in 1951. In Calcutta in 1952, he won only one match, against Ameen Yunoos of Burma. He failed in the next Championship in Sydney in 1954 as well but it gave him a chance to spend time with Walter Lindrum.

On his fourth attempt, on 11 December 1958 Jones won the World Amateur Billiards Championship held at Great Eastern Hotel in Calcutta. In his final match, he defeated Chandra Hirjee of India 4655–2287 in four two-hour sessions. On the previous day, he defeated Leslie Driffield after trailing by more than 660 points with 105 minutes left. Jones took lead with fifteen minutes left and scored 123 unfinished in his last visit. Driffield finished second in the round robin.

This was followed up by another world title in 1964 in New Zealand. After retirement, Jones moved on to coaching, and mentored professional champions such Om Agarwal, Subhash Agarwal, and Ashok Shandilya.

== Death ==
In 2003, Jones died following a heart attack.
