= 1980 Pot Black =

Tournament information
- Dates: Recorded late December 1979 (broadcast 4 January – 18 April 1980)
- Venue: Pebble Mill Studios
- City: Birmingham
- Country: England
- Format: Non-ranking event
- Winner's share: £2000
- Highest break: (Northern Ireland) Dennis Taylor (87)

Final
- Champion: (Australia) Eddie Charlton
- Runner-up: (Wales) Ray Reardon
- Score: 2–1

The 1980 Pot Black event was a professional invitational snooker tournament, which was held at the Pebble Mill Studios in Birmingham. The tournament began with eight players competing in two groups of four using a round-robin format. The matches were one-frame shoot-outs in the group stages, two-frame aggregate scores in the semi-finals, and best-of-three-frames in the final.

Broadcast on BBC2, the programmes started at 21:00 on Friday 4 January 1980. Alan Weeks presented the programme with Ted Lowe as commentator and Sydney Lee as referee.

The first programme of the series featured reigning Pot Black champion Ray Reardon playing against the then world champion Terry Griffiths making his Pot Black debut. Reardon reached the final where he lost 1–2 to Eddie Charlton who himself won his third title equalling the record set by John Spencer.

== Main draw ==
=== Group 1 ===
Player 1	Score	Player 2	Broadcast Date
(Wales) Ray Reardon	1–0	(Wales) Terry Griffiths	4 January 1980
(England) John Spencer	0–1	(Northern Ireland) Dennis Taylor	18 January 1980
(Wales) Ray Reardon	1–0	(England) John Spencer	1 February 1980
(Wales) Terry Griffiths	0–1	(Northern Ireland) Dennis Taylor	22 February 1980
(Wales) Terry Griffiths	0–1	(England) John Spencer	29 February 1980
(Wales) Ray Reardon	0–1	(Northern Ireland) Dennis Taylor	14 March 1980

=== Group 2 ===
Player 1	Score	Player 2	Broadcast Date
(Wales) Doug Mountjoy	125–10	(England) Graham Miles	11 January 1980
(South Africa) Perrie Mans	0–1	(Australia) Eddie Charlton	25 January 1980
(Wales) Doug Mountjoy	0–1	(South Africa) Perrie Mans	15 February 1980
(England) Graham Miles	0–1	(Australia) Eddie Charlton	29 February 1980
(Wales) Doug Mountjoy	0–1	(Australia) Eddie Charlton	7 March 1980
(England) Graham Miles	93-18	(South Africa) Perrie Mans	21 March 1980

=== Knockout stage ===
Semi-finals (28 March and 4 April 1980)
(Wales) Ray Reardon	1
(Wales) Doug Mountjoy	0
(Australia) Eddie Charlton	1
(Northern Ireland) Dennis Taylor	0

Final (18 April 1980)
(Wales) Ray Reardon	1
(Australia) Eddie Charlton	2
3rd place Play-off (11 April 1980)
(Wales) Doug Mountjoy	1
(Northern Ireland) Dennis Taylor	0
