= 1972 Pot Black =

Tournament information
- Dates: 29 December 1971 – 1 January 1972 (broadcast 12 April – 26 July 1972)
- Venue: Pebble Mill Studios
- City: Birmingham
- Country: England
- Format: Non-ranking event
- Highest break: (England) John Spencer (66)

Final
- Champion: (Australia) Eddie Charlton
- Runner-up: (Wales) Ray Reardon
- Score: 75–43

The 1972 Pot Black was a professional invitational snooker tournament that was broadcast in 1972. The tournament was held between 29 December 1971 and 1 January 1972 in the Pebble Mill Studios in Birmingham, and featured six professional players. All matches were one-frame shoot-outs.

Broadcasts were on BBC2 and began at 21:00 on Wednesday 12 April 1972. The tournament in this year was reduced to six players. There was a qualifying stage in which each competitor played three matches. The leading four then played in a round-robin group, from which the top two players qualified for the final. Alan Weeks presented the programme, with Ted Lowe as commentator and Sydney Lee as referee.

The tournament featured its first overseas player, Australia's Eddie Charlton (making his TV debut), who went on to win the tournament by beating Ray Reardon 75–43 in the final, broadcast on 26 July.

== Main draw ==
=== Qualifying group ===
Player 1	Score	Player 2	Broadcast Date
(England) John Spencer	0–1	(Australia) Eddie Charlton	12 April 1972
(Wales) Ray Reardon	1–0	(England) John Pulman	19 April 1972
(England) Fred Davis	0–1	(England) Rex Williams	26 April 1972
(England) John Spencer	0–1	(Wales) Ray Reardon	3 May 1972
(Australia) Eddie Charlton	1–0	(England) Fred Davis	10 May 1972
(England) John Pulman	0–1	(England) Rex Williams	17 May 1972
(England) John Spencer	1–0	(England) Fred Davis	24 May 1972
(Wales) Ray Reardon	1–0	(England) Rex Williams	31 May 1972
(Australia) Eddie Charlton	0–1	(England) John Pulman	7 June 1972

=== Round-robin ===
Player 1	Score	Player 2	Broadcast Date
(England) Rex Williams	1–0	(England) John Spencer	14 June 1972
(Australia) Eddie Charlton	0–1	(Wales) Ray Reardon	21 June 1972
(England) Rex Williams	0–1	(Wales) Ray Reardon	28 June 1972
(Australia) Eddie Charlton	1–0	(England) John Spencer	5 July 1972
(England) John Spencer	1–0	(Wales) Ray Reardon	12 July 1972
(Australia) Eddie Charlton	1–0	(England) Rex Williams	19 July 1972

=== Final ===
26 July 1972
(Wales) Ray Reardon	0
(Australia) Eddie Charlton	1
