= 1980 Pontins Professional =

Tournament information
- Dates: 3–10 May 1980
- Venue: Pontin's
- City: Prestatyn
- Country: Wales
- Organisation: WPBSA
- Format: Non-Ranking event
- Winner's share: £2,000

Final
- Champion: (England) John Virgo
- Runner-up: (Wales) Ray Reardon
- Score: 9–6

The 1980 Pontins Professional was the seventh edition of the professional invitational snooker tournament which took place between 3 and 10 May 1980 in Prestatyn, Wales.

The tournament featured eight professional players. The quarter-final matches were contested over the best of 7 frames, the semi-final matches over the best of 9 frames, and the final over the best of 17 frames.

John Virgo won the event, beating Ray Reardon 9–6 in the final.

== Main draw ==
Quarter-finals; Best of 7 frames
(England) John Virgo	4
(England) Fred Davis	2
(England) Steve Davis	4
(Wales) Terry Griffiths	2
(Wales) Ray Reardon	4
(England) John Spencer	2
(Australia) Eddie Charlton	4
(South Africa) Perrie Mans	3

Semi-finals; Best of 9 frames
(England) John Virgo	5
(England) Steve Davis	3
(Wales) Ray Reardon	5
(Australia) Eddie Charlton	2

Final; Best of 17 frames
(England) John Virgo	9
(Wales) Ray Reardon	6
