= Robbie Grace =

South African snooker player

Personal information
- Born: 14 June 1954 (age 72) Cape Town, South Africa

Sport
- Country: South Africa
- Sport: Snooker
- Professional: 1985–1993
- Highest ranking: 63 (1986–87)
- Best ranking finish: Last 32 (x1)

Robbie Grace (born 14 June 1954) is a South African former professional snooker player.

== Career ==
Robbie Grace was born on 14 June 1954. He started playing professionally in that season, at the 1986 World Championship. In his first match as a professional, he beat Maurice Parkin 10–8, but he lost in the second round of qualifying 3–10 to Wayne Jones.

Despite only winning one match, Grace began the next season ranked 63rd of the 118 players on the main tour; he entered five tournaments during that season, including the 1986 UK Championship, where he defeated Pat Houlihan 9–6, Paul Medati 9–6 and Murdo MacLeod 9–6 to reach the last 32, where he was eliminated 1–9 by Willie Thorne.

Between 1990 and 1992, Grace played nine professional matches, but did not win any. His last victory had come in the first qualifying round of the 1990 World Championship, where he beat Anthony Harris 10–8 but lost in the second round 9–10 to Dave Gilbert. Having not played at all during the 1991/1992 season, he was relegated from the tour at its conclusion, ranked 193rd.

He won the South African Amateur Championship in 1997.

He entered the South African Professional Championship during the 1980s, finishing as runner-up in the 1989 edition, losing 5–8 to Perrie Mans.
