= Eddie Charlton =

Australian snooker player (1929–2004)

Eddie Charlton AM

Personal information
- Nickname: Steady Eddie
- Born: 31 October 1929 Newcastle, New South Wales, Australia
- Died: 7 November 2004 (aged 75) Palmerston North, New Zealand

Sport
- Country: Australia
- Sport: Snooker
- Professional: 1963–1995
- Highest ranking: 3 (1976–1981)
- Best ranking finish: Runner-up (×1)

Edward Francis Charlton (31 October 1929 – 7 November 2004) was an Australian professional snooker and billiards player. He remains the only player to have been world championship runner-up in both snooker and billiards without winning either title. He later became a successful marketer of sporting goods, launching a popular brand of billiard room equipment bearing his name.

== Early life ==
Charlton was born in Newcastle, New South Wales, Australia and came from a sporting family. His grandfather ran a billiards club in Swansea, New South Wales, and Charlton began playing cue sports when he was nine years old. At the age of eleven, he defeated fellow Australian Walter Lindrum in a wartime snooker exhibition match, and he made his first century break when he was seventeen.

He was involved in numerous other sports during his youth: he was a first-grade footballer and played in the Australian First Division Football (soccer) for ten years; he was a champion surfer, and played state-level rugby league and competitive cricket; he also excelled in speed roller skating, rowing, boxing and tennis. In 1956, he was chosen to carry the Olympic torch on part of its journey to the Melbourne Games.

Charlton worked as a coal miner until the age of 31. After winning four amateur snooker titles, he decided to turn professional in 1963 on the advice of Fred Davis. His brother Jim was also a professional snooker player but never joined the world ranks.

== Career ==
Charlton became a professional player in 1963 at the age of 34 and won his first Australian Professional Championship the following season. For the next ten years he won the title annually and made at least the semi-finals in every subsequent meeting through its last edition in 1988. He unsuccessfully challenged Rex Williams for the World Billiards Championship title in 1974 and 1976. His third appearance was in 1984 when he lost by a handful of points to Mark Wildman. Four years later, he lost to two-time champion Norman Dagley in his last World Billiards final.

Charlton was the most successful Australian snooker player until the emergence of Neil Robertson. From the first year of the snooker world rankings in 1976/77, he was ranked number three in the world for the next five consecutive seasons.

Charlton, who was known for his focused and dogged performances, challenged for the World Championship in 1968 and was the runner-up in the final of the World Championship in 1973 and 1975, losing the 1975 world final by just one frame (30–31) to Ray Reardon. He won the BBC's Pot Black competition in 1972, 1973 and 1980. He also recorded the first century break (110) on Pot Black.

In the final of the 1973 World Snooker Championship, played as the best-of-75-frames, Charlton led Ray Reardon 10–5 and 12–10, before the pair were on level terms at both 12–12 and 13–13. Reardon moved into a 17–13 lead, and was 27–25 up after seven sessions of play. At the start of the eighth session, Reardon was affected by the bright lighting that had been installed for the purposes of television coverage, and he lost the first three frames. He complained about the lighting, and two large lights that were focused on the audience were switched off. From 27–28 behind, Reardon won four of the next five frames in the session, and sustained the momentum for an eventual 38–32 victory. According to snooker historian Clive Everton, "Charlton's dogged consistency proved no match for Reardon's flair and wider range of shots."

Charlton faced Reardon in the final of the 1975 World Snooker Championship in a match of 61 frames. Reardon led 16–8, but Charlton then won the next nine frames to take the lead. Reardon was ahead at 22–20, but Charlton won nine of the following ten frames to lead 29–23. Reardon produced a seven-frame winning streak to leave himself needing one further frame at 30–29, then Charlton won the 60th frame. In the deciding frame, Reardon made a 62 break, and secured his victory at 31–30.

He reached the final of the 1991 World Seniors Championship and was a frame away from clinching the title when he led Cliff Wilson 4–2. According to the match report in Snooker Scene magazine, Charlton then "started to falter in a fashion all too familiar with his failures on the brink of other world titles", and he lost 4–5.

His last major achievement at the World Championship was his 10–9 first-round win over Cliff Thorburn at the 1989 World Championship. He qualified for the 1990 and 1991 World Championships but lost in the first round on both occasions. Charlton's final appearance at the Crucible came in 1992, where he was defeated 10–0 by defending champion John Parrott in the first round, the only recorded whitewash in the World Championship until 2019.

Charlton was known for playing with a very straight cue action and rarely hitting the ball with any sidespin, when a less conservative approach might have paid dividends. In retirement from professional snooker Charlton often commentated during the BBC's world championship coverage.

== Personal life ==
Always active in the organisation and promotion of the game, Charlton was appointed a Member of the Order of Australia (AM) in 1980. He formed the Australian Professional Players Association and was responsible for bringing many of the top players to play in Australia. He released a 30-minute beginners' instructional video, Eddie Charlton's Snooker, Pool & Trick Shots, in PAL VHS format. In 1993 he was inducted into the Sport Australia Hall of Fame. He stopped competing in 1995 and died in Palmerston North, New Zealand on 8 November 2004 following an operation.

== Performance and rankings timeline ==
Tournament	1968/ 69	1969/ 70	1970/ 71	1971/ 72	1972/ 73	1973/ 74	1974/ 75	1975/ 76	1976/ 77	1977/ 78	1978/ 79	1979/ 80	1980/ 81	1981/ 82	1982/ 83	1983/ 84	1984/ 85	1985/ 86	1986/ 87	1987/ 88	1988/ 89	1989/ 90	1990/ 91	1991/ 92	1992/ 93	1993/ 94	1994/ 95	1995/ 96
Ranking	No ranking system								3	3	3	3	3	8	5	6	6	12	25	26	19	22	31	27	29	34	60	77
Ranking tournaments
Dubai Classic (Note: The event was also called the Dubai Masters (1988/1989).)	Tournament not held																				NR	2R	1R	LQ	1R	LQ	LQ	A
Grand Prix (Note: The event was also called the Professional Players Tournament (1982/93–1983/1984).)	Tournament not held														SF	3R	3R	2R	1R	3R	2R	1R	2R	1R	1R	LQ	LQ	A
UK Championship	Tournament not held									Non-ranking event							2R	1R	2R	1R	1R	1R	1R	2R	2R	1R	LQ	A
Welsh Open	Tournament not held																							2R	1R	LQ	LQ	A
International Open (Note: The event was also called the Goya Matchroom Trophy (1985/1986).)	Tournament not held													NR	1R	SF	1R	1R	2R	QF	1R	2R	Not held		2R	LQ	LQ	A
European Open	Tournament not held																				QF	3R	2R	1R	1R	LQ	LQ	A
Thailand Open (Note: The event was also called the Thailand Masters (1983/1984–1986/1987) and Asian Open (1989/1990–1992/1993).)	Tournament not held															Non-ranking event				Not held		1R	3R	2R	1R	LQ	LQ	A
British Open (Note: The event was also called the British Gold Cup (1979/1980), Yamaha Organs Trophy (1980/1981) and International Masters (1981/1982–1983/1984).)	Tournament not held											Non-ranking event					1R	3R	2R	1R	1R	1R	2R	3R	2R	WD	LQ	A
World Championship	Non-ranking event					2R	F	SF	QF	SF	SF	QF	2R	SF	QF	2R	2R	2R	LQ	2R	2R	1R	1R	1R	WD	LQ	LQ	A
Non-ranking tournaments
Australian Masters (Note: The event was also called the Hong Kong Open (1989/1990) and Australian Open (1994/1995).)	Tournament not held											A	A	A	F	QF	SF	QF	1R	SF	NH	R	Tournament not held				QF	1R
The Masters	Tournament not held						SF	SF	A	A	QF	QF	1R	QF	SF	1R	1R	QF	A	A	A	A	LQ	LQ	LQ	A	A	A
Irish Masters (Note: The event was also called the Benson & Hedges Ireland Tournament (1974/1975–1976/1977).)	Tournament not held						A	A	A	A	A	A	A	A	QF	1R	QF	A	A	A	A	A	A	A	A	A	A	A
European League (Note: The event was also called the Professional Snooker League (1983/1984) and the Matchroom League (1986/1987 to 1991/1992).)	Tournament not held															RR	Not held		A	A	A	A	A	A	A	A	A	A
Pontins Professional	Tournament not held					QF	A	A	RR	A	A	SF	A	A	A	A	A	A	A	A	A	A	A	A	A	A	A	A
Former ranking tournaments
Canadian Masters (Note: The event was also called the Canadian Open (1978/1979–1980/1981).)	Tournament not held						Non-Ranking							Tournament not held				Non-Ranking			1R	Tournament not held						
Hong Kong Open (Note: The event was also called the Australian Masters (1979/1980–1987/1988).)	Tournament not held											Non-ranking event									NH	2R	Tournament not held				NR	
Classic	Tournament not held											Non-ranking event				QF	1R	1R	3R	1R	1R	2R	3R	1R	Tournament not held			
Strachan Open	Tournament not held																							2R	Tournament not held			
Former non-ranking tournaments
World Championship	A	A	SF	SF	F	Ranking event																						
Norwich Union Open	Tournament not held					SF	A	Tournament not held																				
World Masters	Tournament not held						RR	Tournament not held																				
World Matchplay Championship	Tournament not held								W	Tournament not held																		
Holsten Lager International	Tournament not held										1R	Tournament not held																
Limosin International	Tournament not held											W	Tournament not held															
Kronenbrau 1308 Classic	Tournament not held											W	Tournament not held															
International Open (Note: The event was also called the Goya Matchroom Trophy (1985/1986).)	Tournament not held													2R	Ranking event								Not held		Ranking event			
Classic	Tournament not held											A	A	A	QF	Ranking event												
British Open (Note: The event was also called the British Gold Cup (1979/1980), Yamaha Organs Trophy (1980/1981) and International Masters (1981/1982–1983/1984).)	Tournament not held											A	A	A	2R	2R	Ranking event											
Tolly Cobbold Classic	Tournament not held										A	A	A	A	A	QF	Tournament not held											
New Zealand Masters	Tournament not held																SF	Not held			A	A	Tournament not held					
Pot Black	A	A	A	W	W	SF	RR	SF	RR	SF	RR	W	SF	F	SF	QF	1R	1R	Tournament not held					A	A	A	Not held	
Australian Professional Championship	F	W	W	W	W	W	W	W	W	W	W	Tournament not held					W	F	SF	F	SF	Tournament not held						
Shoot-Out	Tournament not held																						3R	Tournament not held				
World Seniors Championship	Tournament not held																							F	Tournament not held			

Performance Table Legend
LQ	lost in the qualifying draw	#R	lost in the early rounds of the tournament (WR = Wildcard round, RR = Round robin)	QF	lost in the quarter-finals
SF	lost in the semi-finals	F	lost in the final	W	won the tournament
DNQ	did not qualify for the tournament	A	did not participate in the tournament	WD	withdrew from the tournament

NH / not held	means an event was not held.
NR / Non-ranking event	means an event is/was no longer a ranking event.
R / Ranking event	means an event is/was a ranking event.

== Career finals ==
=== Ranking finals: 1 ===
Legend
World Championship (0–1)
Other (0–0)

Outcome	No.	Year	Championship	Opponent in the final	Score
Runner-up	1.	1975	World Snooker Championship (3)	Ray Reardon (WAL)	30–31

=== Non-ranking finals: 34 (26 titles) ===
Legend
World Championship (0–2) (Note: The World Championship did not become a ranking event until 1974.)
Other (26–6)

Outcome	No.	Year	Championship	Opponent in the final	Score
Winner	1.	1963	Australian Professional Championship	Warren Simpson (AUS)	46–45
Runner-up	2.	1964	Australian Professional Championship	Norman Squire (AUS)	Round-robin
Winner	2.	1965	Australian Professional Championship (2)	Warren Simpson (AUS)	Round-robin
Winner	3.	1965	Commonwealth Snooker Championship	Warren Simpson (AUS)	Aggregate Score
Winner	4.	1966	Australian Professional Championship (3)	Warren Simpson (AUS)	7–4
Winner	5.	1967	Australian Professional Championship (4)	Warren Simpson (AUS)	7–1
Runner-up	2.	1968	World Snooker Championship	John Pulman (ENG)	34–39
Runner-up	3.	1968	Australian Professional Championship (2)	Warren Simpson (AUS)	10–11
Winner	6.	1968	World Open Matchplay Championship	Rex Williams (ENG)	43–30
Winner	7.	1969	Australian Professional Championship (5)	Norman Squire (AUS)	8–3
Winner	8.	1969	Australasian Championship	Warren Simpson (AUS)	11–6
Winner	9.	1970	Australian Professional Championship (6)	Warren Simpson (AUS)	Round-robin
Winner	10.	1971	Australian Professional Championship (7)	Warren Simpson (AUS)	11–7
Winner	11.	1971	Hunter Valley Championship	Warren Simpson (AUS)	5–4
Winner	12.	1972	Pot Black	Ray Reardon (WAL)	1–0
Winner	13.	1972	Marrickville Professional	Alex Higgins (NIR)	19–17
Winner	14.	1972	Australian Professional Championship (8)	Gary Owen (WAL)	19–10
Winner	15.	1973	Pot Black (2)	Rex Williams (ENG)	1–0
Runner-up	4.	1973	World Snooker Championship (2)	Ray Reardon (WAL)	32–38
Winner	16.	1973	Australian Professional Championship (9)	Gary Owen (WAL)	31–10
Winner	17.	1974	Australian Professional Championship (10)	Warren Simpson (AUS)	44–17
Winner	18.	1975	Australian Professional Championship (11)	Dennis Wheelwright (AUS)	31–10
Winner	19.	1976	Australian Professional Championship (12)	Paddy Morgan (AUS)	Walkover
Winner	20.	1976	World Professional Match-play Championship	Ray Reardon (WAL)	31–24
Winner	21.	1977	Australian Professional Championship (13)	Paddy Morgan (AUS)	25–21
Winner	22.	1978	Australian Professional Championship (14)	Ian Anderson (AUS)	29–13
Winner	23.	1979	Kronenbrau 1308 Classic	Ray Reardon (WAL)	7–4
Winner	24.	1979	Limosin International	John Spencer (ENG)	23–19
Winner	25.	1980	Pot Black (3)	Ray Reardon (WAL)	2–1
Runner-up	5.	1982	Pot Black	Steve Davis (ENG)	0–2
Runner-up	6.	1982	Australian Masters	Steve Davis (ENG)	100–254 points
Winner	26.	1984	Australian Professional Championship (15)	Warren King (AUS)	10–3
Runner-up	7.	1985	Australian Professional Championship (3)	John Campbell (AUS)	7–10
Runner-up	8.	1987	Australian Professional Championship (4)	Warren King (AUS)	7–10

=== Team finals: 2 (1 title) ===
Outcome	No.	Year	Championship	Team/partner	Opponent(s) in the final	Score
Winner	1.	1975	Ladbroke International	Rest of the World	England	Cumulative score
Runner-up	1.	1988	World Cup	Australia	England	7–9

=== Seniors finals: 1 ===
Outcome	No.	Year	Championship	Opponent in the final	Score
Runner-up	1.	1991	World Seniors Championship	Cliff Wilson (WAL)	4–5

== In popular culture ==
Charlton appeared in a comedy sketch in a 1992 episode of ABC Television's The Late Show, alongside Mick Molloy. The sketch begins with Charlton, as himself, competing in a televised professional snooker game, then being interrupted by a comically boorish Molloy, behaving as if it were a casual eight-ball game in an Australian pub, demanding to play against Charlton and insisting the game be played according to "pub rules". The game proceeds, with Molloy heckling and interfering so much that Molloy wins the game with Charlton failing to pocket a single ball. At Molloy's suggestion, in accordance with unwritten rules of Australian pub pool, Charlton proceeds to drop his trousers and run a lap of the table.
