= Jimmy van Rensberg =

South African snooker player

Personal information
- Born: 24 October 1931 (age 94) Johannesburg, South Africa

Sport
- Country: South Africa
- Sport: Snooker
- Professional: 1978–1991
- Highest ranking: 59 (1986/1987)
- Best ranking finish: Last 32 (x1)

Jimmy van Rensberg (born 24 October 1931) is a South African former professional snooker player. He won the South African Professional Championship in 1984. He was a record 12-time winner of the South African Amateur Championship.

== Career ==
Born in 1931, van Rensberg turned professional in 1978 at the relatively advanced age of 46. He entered few tournaments in his first several seasons on tour, reaching the final of the 1979 South African Professional Championship after beating Silvino Francisco in the semi-finals; this was van Rensberg's first match in the event, and he lost the final 6–9 to Derek Mienie.

After losing 1–9 to Tony Meo in qualifying for the 1980 World Championship, van Rensberg next played a competitive match in the 1984 edition of the tournament. There, he beat Vic Harris 10–7 and in his last-64 match, came to trail Ray Edmonds 0–7. He won the next three frames, but Edmonds took the eleventh and twelfth to leave van Rensberg 3–9 behind; however, from there the latter won seven consecutive frames to prevail 10–9. In the last 48, he faced Francisco again, but a 0–9 deficit proved too much to recover, and he lost 3–10.

The 1985 World Championship saw van Rensberg himself fall victim to a comeback, as the Canadian Marcel Gauvreau recovered from 0–3 and 6–9 to defeat him 10–9.

Van Rensberg was able to enter six tournaments in the 1985/1986 season, and recorded his first last-32 finish at the 1986 Classic, where he beat Wayne Jones 5–4 and John Parrott 5–3 before Steve Davis ended his run with a 1–5 loss.

Ranked 59th, a career-best, for 1986/1987, van Rensberg registered three last-64 finishes therein; at the International Open, he lost 3–5 to Barry West, while Francisco beat him 5–4 in the 1987 Classic and his World Championship qualifying attempt culminated in a 0–10 whitewash by Tony Jones.

Poor form followed in the next few years, and during the 1988/1989 season, van Rensberg lost all nine of the matches he played. In the 1989 Hong Kong Open, he made a break of 104 - his first and only century break - in a match against Alain Robidoux, but lost 1–5; his best performance that season, and best for several years, was a run to the last 64 at the 1990 Dubai Classic. There, he was beaten 5–4 by John Virgo.

A 1–5 loss to Tony Wilson of the Isle of Man, in the 1990 British Open, would be van Rensberg's final at competitive level; he never played again, and was relegated from the tour in 1991, aged 59.
