= 1983 Professional Players Tournament =

Professional Players Tournament
Tournament information
- Dates: 10–21 October 1983
- Venue: Redwood Lodge
- City: Bristol
- Country: England
- Organisation: WPBSA
- Format: Ranking event
- Total prize fund: £60,000
- Winner's share: £12,500
- Highest break: Joe Johnson (ENG) (135)

Final
- Champion: Tony Knowles (ENG)
- Runner-up: Joe Johnson (ENG)
- Score: 9–8

The 1983 Professional Players Tournament was a professional ranking snooker tournament which took place between 3 September and 21 October 1983.

In a change from the previous year, the event was hosted at one venue, the 600-seater Redwood Lodge in Bristol. The following year, it would be renamed as the Grand Prix.

The event started on 10 October, the day after the finish of the International Open at Newcastle-upon-Tyne. Cliff Thorburn, a finalist in the International Open, had to travel overnight to Bristol for his first match the following morning, but won against Vic Harris 5–1. World number one Steve Davis was beaten 5–2 at the last-32 stage by Mike Hallett.

Willie Thorne reached his first major semi-final after beating Eugene Hughes 5–2 in the quarter-finals. Hughes had reached the quarter-finals after beating Bill Werbeniuk 5–0 and then Terry Griffiths 5–2 at the last-16 stage.

Joe Johnson reached the first ranking final of his four-year professional career, defeating Pascal Burke, Jimmy White, Eddie Charlton, Cliff Thorburn and Tony Meo. His opponent Tony Knowles reached his second ranking final, overcoming Paul Medati, Rex Williams, Silvino Francisco, John Campbell and Willie Thorne.

In the final, Knowles dominated most of the match, building a 6–1 lead. Johnson then made the highest break of the tournament, a 135, in recovering to a score of 5–7 and eventually levelled the match at 8–8. Knowles won the deciding frame on the colours, to prevail 9–8, winning the first prize of £12,500. Johnson won £7,500 as runner-up and £1,000 for the high break prize.

== Main draw ==
Last 64; Best of 9 frames
Ray Reardon (WAL) (1) | 5
George Ganim (AUS) | 4
Steve Duggan (ENG) | 5
John Dunning (ENG) | 2
Willie Thorne (ENG) | 5
Clive Everton (WAL) | 1
John Spencer (ENG) (16) | 5
Ian Black (SCO) | 2
Eugene Hughes (IRL) | 5
Eddie Sinclair (SCO) | 4
Bill Werbeniuk (CAN) (8) | 5
Tony Jones (ENG) | 4
Terry Griffiths (WAL) (9) | 5
Les Dodd (ENG) | 1
John Parrott (ENG) | 5
Patsy Fagan (IRL) | 2
Tony Knowles (ENG) (4) | 5
Paul Medati (ENG) | 1
Rex Williams (ENG) | 5
Dessie Sheehan (IRL) | 1
Silvino Francisco (RSA) | 5
Mario Morra (CAN) | 3
George Scott (ENG) | 5
Dennis Taylor (NIR) (13) | 4
John Campbell (AUS) | 5
Doug Mountjoy (WAL) (12) | 3
Graham Miles (ENG) | 5
Marcel Gauvreau (CAN) | 3
Dave Martin (ENG) | 5
Jack Fitzmaurice (ENG) | 0
Mike Watterson (ENG) | 5
Alex Higgins (NIR) (5) | 2

Last 32; Best of 9 frames
(Wales) Ray Reardon (1) | 5
(England) Steve Duggan | 2
(England) Willie Thorne | 5
(England) John Spencer (16) | 1
(Republic of Ireland) Eugene Hughes | 5
(Canada) Bill Werbeniuk (8) | 0
(Wales) Terry Griffiths (9) | 5
(England) John Parrott | 1
(England) Tony Knowles (4) | 5
(England) Rex Williams | 4
(South Africa) Silvino Francisco | 5
(England) George Scott | 1
(Australia) John Campbell | 5
(England) Graham Miles | 2
(England) Dave Martin | 5
(England) Mike Watterson | 4

Last 16; Best of 9 frames
(Wales) Ray Reardon (1) | 3
(England) Willie Thorne | 5
(Republic of Ireland) Eugene Hughes | 5
(Wales) Terry Griffiths (9) | 2
(England) Tony Knowles (4) | 5
(South Africa) Silvino Francisco | 0
(Australia) John Campbell | 5
(England) Dave Martin | 0

Quarter-finals; Best of 9 frames
(England) Willie Thorne | 5
(Republic of Ireland) Eugene Hughes | 1
(England) Tony Knowles (4) | 5
(Australia) John Campbell | 3

Semi-finals; Best of 17 frames
(England) Willie Thorne | 7
(England) Tony Knowles (4) | 9

Last 64; Best of 9 frames
Joe Johnson (ENG) | 5
Pascal Burke (IRL) | 3
Jimmy White (ENG) (11) | 5
Ian Williamson (ENG) | 2
Eddie Charlton (AUS) (6) | 5
Eddie McLaughlin (SCO) | 0
Mick Fisher (ENG) | 5
Fred Davis (ENG) | 4
Cliff Thorburn (CAN) (3) | 5
Vic Harris (ENG) | 1
Jim Meadowcroft (ENG) | 5
Colin Roscoe (WAL) | 4
Cliff Wilson (WAL) | 5
Bernard Bennett (ENG) | 1
John Virgo (ENG) (14) | 5
Doug French (ENG) | 4
Tony Meo (ENG) (15) | 5
Warren King (AUS) | 2
Dean Reynolds (ENG) | 5
David Greaves (ENG) | 1
Mike Hallett (ENG) | 5
Billy Kelly (IRL) | 4
Steve Davis (ENG) (2) | 5
Jim Donnelly (SCO) | 1
Kirk Stevens (CAN) (7) | 5
Ray Edmonds (ENG) | 1
Tommy Murphy (NIR) | 5
Murdo MacLeod (SCO) | 0
Mark Wildman (ENG) | 5
Frank Jonik (CAN) | 4
David Taylor (ENG) (10) | 5
Paddy Morgan (AUS) | 3

Last 32; Best of 9 frames
(England) Joe Johnson | 5
(England) Jimmy White (11) | 3
(Australia) Eddie Charlton (6) | 5
(England) Mick Fisher | 4
(Canada) Cliff Thorburn (3) | 5
(England) Jim Meadowcroft | 1
(Wales) Cliff Wilson | 5
(England) John Virgo (14) | 1
(England) Tony Meo (15) | 5
(England) Dean Reynolds | 0
(England) Mike Hallett | 5
(England) Steve Davis (2) | 2
(Canada) Kirk Stevens (7) | 5
(Northern Ireland) Tommy Murphy | 1
(England) Mark Wildman | 5
(England) David Taylor (10) | 3

Last 16; Best of 9 frames
(England) Joe Johnson | 5
(Australia) Eddie Charlton (6) | 0
(Canada) Cliff Thorburn (3) | 5
(Wales) Cliff Wilson | 3
(England) Tony Meo (15) | 5
(England) Mike Hallett | 3
(Canada) Kirk Stevens (7) | 5
(England) Mark Wildman | 0

Quarter-finals; Best of 9 frames
(England) Joe Johnson | 5
(Canada) Cliff Thorburn (3) | 1
(England) Tony Meo (15) | 5
(Canada) Kirk Stevens (7) | 3

Semi-finals; Best of 17 frames
(England) Joe Johnson | 9
(England) Tony Meo (15) | 6

== Final ==
Final: Best of 17 frames. Redwood Lodge, Bristol, England, 21 October 1983.
| Tony Knowles; England | 9–8 | Joe Johnson; England |
92–22, 80–16, 67–41, 26–81, 84–17, 82–18, 62–17, 0–135 (135), 58–61, 28–63, 78–32, 17–100, 76–0, 39–90, 9–76, 14–93, 73–33
| 75 | Highest break | 135 |
| 0 | Century breaks | 1 |

== Century breaks ==
- 135, 117, 111 – Joe Johnson
- 122 – John Campbell
- 112, 100 – Eugene Hughes
- 102 – Tony Knowles
