= 1984 World Doubles Championship =

Hofmeister World Doubles
Tournament information
- Dates: 5–16 December 1984
- Venue: Derngate
- City: Northampton
- Country: England
- Format: Non-ranking event
- Total prize fund: £150,000
- Winner's share: £34,500
- Highest break: 200 Hallett/Taylor (combined)

Final
- Champion: Higgins/White
- Runner-up: Thorburn/Thorne
- Score: 10–2

The 1984 Hofmeister World Doubles was the second staging of the doubles snooker tournament. It was played at the Derngate in Northampton and held between 5 and 16 December 1984 with the tournament televised on ITV.

Defending champions Steve Davis and Tony Meo chances for a third title ended by the teaming of Alex Higgins and Jimmy White in the semi-final by 6–9 and Higgins and White went on to beat Cliff Thorburn and Willie Thorne 10–2 in the final. The highest break of the tournament did not go to the champions but to David Taylor and Mike Hallett with a combined break of 200.

== Selected early results ==
Qualifying Round Played at Hatton Garden on 2 and 3 November 1984

| (Canada) (England) Morra/Bradley | 5–1 | (England) (Scotland) Williamson/Mike Darrington |
| (England) (South Africa) Miles/P. Francisco | 5– 4 | (England) (England) Hargreaves/Duggan |
| (England) (Northern Ireland) Chalmers/McLaughlin | 5–0 | (Republic of Ireland) (England) Fagan/B. Harris |
| (Republic of Ireland) (England) Sheehan/Watchorn | 5–0 | (Scotland) (Scotland) MacLeod/Gibson |
| (England) (England) F. Davis/Watterson | 5–3 | (Australia) (Wales) Foldvari/Everton |
| (Canada) (England) Gauvreau/Fowler | 5–1 | (England) (England) Houlihan/Bennett |

Last 32

Played at the Derngate, Northampton before the TV coverage began with the last 16 on 8 December.

| (England) (England) S. Davis/Meo | 5–2 | (England) (Republic of Ireland) D. Hughes/Kearney |
| (England) (South Africa) Miles/P. Francisco | 5– 4 | (England) (Wales) Johnson/Wilson |
| (Canada) (England) Werbeniuk/Charlton | 5–2 | (Republic of Ireland) (England) Sheehan/Watchorn |
| (England) (England) David Taylor/Hallett | 5–3 | (Republic of Ireland) (England) Hughes/Dodd |
| (Northern Ireland) (England) Higgins/White | 5–2 | (England) (England) Martin/Crispey |
| (England) (New Zealand) Reynolds/O'Kane | 5–4 | (Canada) (England) Gauvreau/Fowler |
| (Wales) (England) Griffiths/Parrott | 5–0 | (England) (Northern Ireland) Chalmers/McLaughlin |
| (England) (England) Bales/Oliver | 5–2 | (England) (England) N. Foulds/G. Foulds |
| (Canada) (England) Thorburn/Thorne | 5–2 | (Canada) (England) Morra/Bradley |
| (Wales) (Wales) Mountjoy/Jones | 5–1 | (Wales) (Wales) Chappel/Newbury |
| (Canada) (England) Stevens/Virgo | 5–0 | (Scotland) (Wales) Donnelly/Roscoe |
| (Northern Ireland) (England) Dennis Taylor/Williams | 5–0 | (England) (Republic of Ireland) Medati/Browne |
| (England) (England) Knowles/Spencer | 5–? | (England) (England) Harris/Fitzmaurice |
| (England) (England) Wildman/Fisher | 5–3 | (England) (England) Edmonds/Meadowcroft |
| (Wales) (Northern Ireland) Reardon/Murphy | 5–2 | (England) (England) F. Davis/Watterson |
| (South Africa) (England) S. Francisco/Jones | 5–4 | (Australia) (Australia) Campbell/King |

== Main draw ==
Last 16; Best of 9 frames
(England) (England) Davis/Meo | 5
(England) (South Africa) Miles/Francisco | 2
(Canada) (Australia) Werbeniuk/Charlton | 4
(England) (England) Taylor/Hallett | 5
(Northern Ireland) (England) Higgins/White | 5
(England) (New Zealand) Reynolds/O'Kane | 4
(Wales) (England) Griffiths/Parrott | 5
(England) (England) Bales/Oliver | 4
(Canada) (England) Thorburn/Thorne | 5
(Wales) (Wales) Mountjoy/Jones | 3
(Canada) (England) Stevens/Virgo | 5
(Northern Ireland) (England) Taylor/Williams | 3
(England) (England) Knowles/Spencer | 5
(England) (England) Wildman/Fisher | 4
(South Africa) (England) Francisco/Jones | 3
(Wales) (Northern Ireland) Reardon/Murphy | 5

Quarter-finals; Best of 9 frames
(England) (England) Davis/Meo | 5
(England) (England) Taylor/Hallett | 1
(Northern Ireland) (England) Higgins/White | 5
(Wales) (England) Griffiths/Parrott | 2
(Canada) (England) Thorburn/Thorne | 5
(Canada) (England) Stevens/Virgo | 3
(England) (England) Knowles/Spencer | 5
(Wales) (Northern Ireland) Reardon/Murphy | 4

Semi-finals; Best of 17 frames
(England) (England) Davis/Meo | 6
(Northern Ireland) (England) Higgins/White | 9
(Canada) (England) Thorburn/Thorne | 9
(England) (England) Knowles/Spencer | 1

Final; Best of 19 frames
(Northern Ireland) (England) Higgins/White | 10
(Canada) (England) Thorburn/Thorne | 2
