= 1986 British Open =

1986 Dulux British Open
Tournament information
- Dates: 16 February – 2 March 1986
- Venue: Assembly Rooms
- City: Derby
- Country: England
- Organisation: WPBSA
- Format: Ranking event
- Total prize fund: £275,000
- Winner's share: £55,000
- Highest break: Dave Martin (ENG) (145)

Final
- Champion: Steve Davis (ENG)
- Runner-up: Willie Thorne (ENG)
- Score: 12–7

The 1986 British Open (officially the 1986 Dulux British Open) was a professional ranking snooker tournament, that was held from 16 February to 2 March 1986 with television coverage beginning on 21 February at the Assembly Rooms in Derby, England.

== Main draw ==
The Last 64 was played at Solihull on 4 and 5 December 1985. The last 32 onwards was played at Derby.

Last 64; Best of 9 frames
(South Africa) Silvino Francisco	5
(England) Tony Jones	2
(Scotland) Murdo MacLeod	5
(England) Fred Davis	4
(Wales) Terry Griffiths	5
(England) George Scott	3
(England) Neal Foulds	5
(England) John Hargreaves	4
(England) Willie Thorne	5
(England) Les Dodd	2
(South Africa) Perrie Mans	5
(Wales) Wayne Jones	2
(Canada) Kirk Stevens	5
(England) Graham Miles	3
(Wales) Cliff Wilson	5
(Canada) Bob Chaperon	3
(Canada) Cliff Thorburn	5
(Republic of Ireland) Dessie Sheehan	0
(England) Mark Wildman	5
(Australia) Greg Jenkins	4
(England) Tony Meo	5
(Scotland) Jim Donnelly	3
(Wales) Steve Newbury	5
(New Zealand) Dene O'Kane	3
(England) John Virgo	5
(England) Danny Fowler	1
(Scotland) John Rea	5
(Wales) Ray Reardon	3
(Australia) Eddie Charlton	5
(England) Dave Gilbert	2
(Republic of Ireland) Paddy Browne	5
(England) John Spencer	0
(Northern Ireland) Alex Higgins	5
(England) Malcolm Bradley	3
(England) Mike Hallett	5
(England) Steve Duggan	3
(South Africa) Peter Francisco	5
(England) Jimmy White	4
(England) Steve Longworth	5
(Republic of Ireland) Eugene Hughes	4
(England) Rex Williams	5
(Malta) Tony Drago	1
(England) Roger Bales	5
(Northern Ireland) Dennis Taylor	4
(England) Joe Johnson	5
(Northern Ireland) Jack McLaughlin	2
(Canada) Bill Werbeniuk	5
(Australia) Robby Foldvari	4
(England) John Parrott	5
(Wales) Colin Roscoe	2
(Republic of Ireland) Patsy Fagan	5
(Wales) Doug Mountjoy	1
(Canada) Jim Wych	5
(England) Dean Reynolds	3
(England) Tony Knowles	5
(England) Ian Williamson	1
(Australia) John Campbell	5
(England) Barry West	4
(England) Paul Medati	5
(England) David Taylor	1
(England) Dave Martin	5
(England) Bob Harris	1
(England) Steve Davis	5
(Scotland) Ian Black	2

Last 32; Best of 9 frames
(South Africa) Silvino Francisco	1
(Scotland) Murdo MacLeod	5
(Wales) Terry Griffiths	5
(England) Neal Foulds	3
(England) Willie Thorne	5
(South Africa) Perrie Mans	1
(Canada) Kirk Stevens	5
(Wales) Cliff Wilson	0
(Canada) Cliff Thorburn	5
(England) Mark Wildman	1
(England) Tony Meo	5
(Wales) Steve Newbury	0
(England) John Virgo	5
(Scotland) John Rea	0
(Australia) Eddie Charlton	5
(Republic of Ireland) Paddy Browne	1
(England) Alex Higgins	5
(England) Mike Hallett	1
(South Africa) Peter Francisco	5
(England) Steve Longworth	2
(England) Rex Williams	5
(England) Roger Bales	4
(England) Joe Johnson	3
(Canada) Bill Werbeniuk	5
(England) John Parrott	5
(Republic of Ireland) Patsy Fagan	0
(Canada) Jim Wych	5
(England) Tony Knowles	4
(Australia) John Campbell	5
(England) Paul Medati	4
(England) Dave Martin	1
(England) Steve Davis	5

Last 16; Best of 9 frames
(Scotland) Murdo MacLeod	2
(Wales) Terry Griffiths	5
(England) Willie Thorne	5
(Canada) Kirk Stevens	4
(Canada) Cliff Thorburn	3
(England) Tony Meo	5
(England) John Virgo	5
(Australia) Eddie Charlton	4
(Northern Ireland) Alex Higgins	5
(South Africa) Peter Francisco	2
(England) Rex Williams	3
(Canada) Bill Werbeniuk	5
(England) John Parrott	4
(Canada) Jim Wych	5
(Australia) John Campbell	0
(England) Steve Davis	5

Quarter-finals; Best of 9 frames
(Wales) Terry Griffiths	4
(England) Willie Thorne	5
(England) Tony Meo	3
(England) John Virgo	5
(Northern Ireland) Alex Higgins	5
(Canada) Bill Werbeniuk	1
(Canada) Jim Wych	2
(England) Steve Davis	5

Semi-finals; Best of 17 frames
(England) Willie Thorne	9
(England) John Virgo	4
(Northern Ireland) Alex Higgins	3
(England) Steve Davis	9

Final; Best of 23 frames
(England) Willie Thorne	7
(England) Steve Davis	12

== Final ==
Final: Best of 23 frames. Referee: Assembly Rooms, Derby, England. 1 and 2 March 1986.
Steve Davis; England	12–7	Willie Thorne; England
Afternoon: 61–66 (Davis 60), 80–18, 72–37, 84–27 (60), 84–13 (59), 63–27, 71–46 (60), Evening: 85–8 (77), 127–1 (127), 30–65, 26–65, 74–15 (74), 43–66, 1–102 (60); Afternoon: 64–78, 70–16, 25–108 (81), 113–0 (93), 85–39 (85)
127	Highest break	81
1	Century breaks	0
9	50+ breaks	2
