= 1983 World Doubles Championship =

Hofmeister World Doubles
Tournament information
- Dates: 9–18 December 1983
- Venue: Derngate
- City: Northampton
- Country: England
- Format: Non-ranking event
- Total prize fund: £75,000
- Winner's share: £25,000
- Highest break: 196 Davis/Meo (combined)

Final
- Champion: Steve Davis/Tony Meo
- Runner-up: Tony Knowles/Jimmy White
- Score: 10–2

The 1983 Hofmeister World Doubles was the second staging of the doubles professional snooker tournament. It was played between 9 and 18 December 1983 with the tournament televised on ITV now showing it in eight days.

The venue was the Derngate in Northampton which proved to be a better environment for snooker matches than the National Sports Centre used the previous year. Steve Davis and Tony Meo successfully defended their title, beating Tony Knowles and Jimmy White 10–2 in the final. They also won the highest combined break prize with 196 from their semi-final, with Davis compiling a 140 and Meo making a 56. The event was sponsored by Courage, and the total prize fund was £75,000 including £25,000 for the winning pair.

== Main draw ==
Last 16; Best of 9 frames
(England) (England) S. Davis/Meo (1) | 5
(Northern Ireland) (Australia) Murphy/Morgan | 2
(England) (England) David Taylor/Thorne (8) | 5
(Northern Ireland) (England) Dennis Taylor/Williams | 4
(Canada) (Australia) Werbeniuk/Charlton (5) | 5
(South Africa) (England) Francisco/Jones | 3
(Northern Ireland) (Canada) Higgins/Stevens (4) | w.o.
(England) (Australia) Miles/Ganim
(Wales) (England) Reardon/Spencer (3) | 5
(England) (England) F. Davis/Watterson | 2
(Canada) (England) Thorburn/Virgo (6) | 5
(England) (Republic of Ireland) Reynolds/Fagan | 2
(Wales) (Wales) Griffiths/Mountjoy (7) | 5
(Republic of Ireland) (England) Hughes/Dodd | 3
(England) (England) Knowles/White (2) | 5
(Canada) (England) Morra/B. Harris | 4

Quarter-finals; Best of 9 frames
(England) (England) Davis/Meo (1) | 5
(England) (England) Taylor/Thorne (8) | 3
(Canada) (Australia) Werbeniuk/Charlton (5) | 5
(Northern Ireland) (Canada) Higgins/Stevens (4) | 1
(Wales) (England) Reardon/Spencer (3) | 0
(Canada) (England) Thorburn/Virgo (6) | 5
(Wales) (Wales) Griffiths/Mountjoy (7) | 0
(England) (England) Knowles/White (2) | 5

Semi-finals; Best of 17 frames
(England) (England) Davis/Meo (1) | 9
(Canada) (Australia) Werbeniuk/Charlton (5) | 1
(Canada) (England) Thorburn/Virgo (6) | 7
(England) (England) Knowles/White (2) | 9

Final; Best of 19 frames
(England) (England) Davis/Meo (1) | 10
(England) (England) Knowles/White (2) | 2

Miles /Ganim were disqualified after Miles failed to turn up.

== Earlier Rounds ==
A pre-qualifying round and qualifying round took place leading up to the first round.

=== Pre-qualifying ===
| (England) (England) Bennett/Houlihan | 5–2 | (Scotland) (Scotland) Gibson/MacLeod |
| (England) (England) Duggan/Hargreaves | 5–1 | (England) (Republic of Ireland) Oliver/Browne |
| (England) (England) Scott/Parrott | 5–4 | (England) (England) G. Foulds/N. Foulds |
| (Canada) (England) Morra/B. Harris | 5–2 | (Republic of Ireland) (Scotland) Sheehan/Eddie McLauglin |

=== Qualifying ===
| (Northern Ireland) (Australia) Murphy/Morgan | 5–4 | (Republic of Ireland) (England) Burke/Martin |
| (England) (England) Fitzmaurice/V. Harris | 5–4 | (England) (England) Bennett/Houlihan |
| (Scotland) (Wales) Donnelly/Roscoe | 5–3 | (Australia) (Australia) King/Campbell |
| (England) (England) Duggan/Hargreaves | 5–0 | (England) (Republic of Ireland) Hughes/Kelly |
| (England) (Scotland) Dunning/Demarco | 5–4 | (England) (England) Hallett/Cripsey |
| (England) (England) Edmonds/Meadowcroft | 5–2 | (Wales) (England) Everton/French |
| (Republic of Ireland) (England) Hughes/Dodd | 5–2 | (England) (England) Scott/Parrott |
| (Canada) (England) Morra/B. Harris | 5–1 | (England) (England) Darrington/Williamson |

=== First round ===
| (Northern Ireland) (Australia) Murphy/Morgan | 5–1 | (Scotland) (Scotland) Black/Sinclair |
| (Northern Ireland) (England) Taylor/Williams | 5–1 | (England) (England) Fitzmaurice/V. Harris |
| (South Africa) (England) Francisco/Jones | 5–2 | (Scotland) (Wales) Donnelly/Roscoe |
| (England) (Australia) Miles/Ganim | 5–3 | (England) (England) Duggan/Hargreaves |
| (England) (England) F. Davis/Watterson | 5–3 | (England) (Scotland) Dunning/Demarco |
| (England) (Republic of Ireland) Reynolds/Fagan | 5–0 | (England) (England) Edmonds/Meadowcroft |
| (Republic of Ireland) (England) Hughes/Dodd | 5–1 | (Wales) (England) Wilson/Johnson |
| (Canada) (England) Morra/B. Harris | 5–2 | (England) (England) Fisher/Wildman |
