= 1982 World Doubles Championship =

Hofmeister World Doubles
Tournament information
- Dates: 13–19 December 1982
- Venue: Crystal Palace National Recreation Centre
- City: London
- Country: England
- Format: Non-ranking event
- Total prize fund: £66,000
- Winner's share: £24,000
- Highest break: 193 Davis/Meo (combined)

Final
- Champion: Davis/Meo
- Runner-up: Griffiths/Mountjoy
- Score: 13–2

The 1982 World Doubles was the first championship of a doubles tournament for professional snooker players. The championship was sponsored by brewers Hofmeister and 29 teams entered the event with the last 16 competing at the National Recreation Centre in Crystal Palace, London. It was played in December with the semi-finals and final televised on ITV between 15 and 19 December 1982.

Steve Davis and Tony Meo went on to win the tournament, defeating Terry Griffiths and Doug Mountjoy 13–2 in the final. Davis and Meo achieved a combined break of 193 in their semi-final with Tony Knowles and Jimmy White, which included a single 124 break by Meo. Davis became the first player to have won three types of world professional titles individual, team and doubles. Audience ticket sales were below expectations.

== Results ==
Winning players are denoted in bold.

First round Best of 11 frames
(England) (England) **Davis/Meo**	**6**
(Canada) (England) Thorburn/Virgo	2
(Wales) (England) Reardon/Spencer	2
(England) (England) **Knowles/White**	**6**
(Northern Ireland) (Australia) **Higgins/Charlton**	**6**
(Canada) (England) Werbeniuk/Miles	3
(Wales) (Wales) **Griffiths/Mountjoy**	**6**
(Canada) (Canada) Stevens/Wych	1

Semi-finals; Best of 19 frames
(England) (England) **Davis/Meo**	**10**
(England) (England) Knowles/White	5
(Northern Ireland) (Australia) Higgins/Charlton	7
(Wales) (Wales) **Griffiths/Mountjoy**	**10**

Final; Best of 25 frames
(England) (England) **Davis/Meo**	**13**
(Wales) (Wales) Griffiths/Mountjoy	2

== Earlier Rounds ==
A pre-qualifying round and qualifying round took place leading up to the first round. Winning players are denoted in bold. Played at Redwood Lodge, Bristol and Warwick University Arts Centre between 1–3 November 1982.

=== Pre-qualifying ===
(Wales) (England) **Wilson/Johnson**	w.o.	(Canada) (Canada) Morra/Jonik
(England) (England) **Bennett/Houlihan**	**6**–2	(Scotland) (Scotland) Sinclair/Black
(England) (England) **Hallett/Cripsey**	**6**–3	(Scotland) (Scotland) MacLeod/McLaughlin
(England) (England) **Harris/Williamson**	**6**–1	(Northern Ireland) (Republic of Ireland) Murphy/Hughes
(England) (England) **Fisher/Wildman**	**6**–3	(Wales) (Wales) Everton/Roscoe

(England) (England) **Reynolds/Watterson**	**6**–3	(England) (England) Bennett/Houlihan
(England) (England) **F. Davis/Medati**	**6**–0	(England) (Scotland) Dunning/Demarco
(Northern Ireland) (England) **Dennis Taylor/Dave Martin**	**6**–2	(England) (England) French/Dodd
(England) (England) **Hallett/Cripsey**	**6**–2	(Republic of Ireland) (England) Fagan/Foulds
(England) (England) **Williams/Fitzmaurice**	**6**–1	(England) (England) Harris/Williamson
(England) (England) **White/Knowles**	**6**–2	(England) (England) Hughes/Scott
(England) (England) **Fisher/Wildman**	**6**–5	(Scotland) (Scotland) Gibson/Donnelly
(Wales) (England) **Wilson/Johnson**	**6**–4	(England) (England) Meadowcroft/Edmonds

(England) (England) **S. Davis/Meo**	**6**–3	(England) (England) Reynolds/Watterson
(Canada) (England) **Thorburn/Virgo**	**6**–2	(England) (England) Fisher/Wildman
(Wales) (England) **Reardon/Spencer**	**6**–2	(England) (Wales) Johnson/Wilson
(England) (England) **White/Knowles**	**6**–1	(England) (England) David Taylor/Thorne
(Canada) (England) **Werbeniuk/Miles**	**6**–5	(England) (England) Williams/Fitzmaurice
(Canada) (Canada) **Stevens/Wych**	**6**–4	(England) (England) Hallett/Cripsey
(Wales) (Wales) **Griffiths/Mountjoy**	**6**–0	(Northern Ireland) (England) Dennis Taylor/Dave Martin
(Northern Ireland) (Australia) **Higgins/Charlton**	**6**–3	(England) (England) F. Davis/Medati
