= 1985 English Professional Championship =

English Professional Championship
Tournament information
- Dates: 5–10 February 1985
- Venue: Corn Exchange
- City: Ipswich
- Country: England
- Format: Non-ranking event
- Total prize fund: £75,000
- Winner's share: £17,500
- Highest break: Tony Knowles (139)

Final
- Champion: Steve Davis
- Runner-up: Tony Knowles
- Score: 9–2

The 1985 Tolly Cobbold English Professional Championship was a professional non-ranking snooker tournament, which took place between 5 and 10 February 1985 in Ipswich, England.

Steve Davis won the title by defeating Tony Knowles 9–2 in the final.

== Main draw ==
Best of 17 frames

Last 32
Steve Davis	9
Danny Fowler	3
Rex Williams	9
Tony Jones	6
John Virgo	9
Mike Darrington	0
Joe Johnson	9
George Scott	1
Tony Meo	9
Mick Fisher	3
Mike Hallett	9
Steve Duggan	4
Dean Reynolds	9
Jack Fitzmaurice	2
Willie Thorne	9
Les Dodd	1
Tony Knowles	9
Malcolm Bradley	8
Dave Martin	9
Graham Miles	7
David Taylor	9
Graham Cripsey	5
John Parrott	9
Geoff Foulds	4
Steve Longworth	9
Mark Wildman	3
Paul Medati	9
John Spencer	4
Jimmy White	9
Dave Chalmers	5
Neal Foulds	9
Dennis Hughes	3

Last 16
Steve Davis	9
Rex Williams	2
John Virgo	9
Joe Johnson	4
Tony Meo	9
Mike Hallett	4
Dean Reynolds	9
Willie Thorne	6
Tony Knowles	9
Dave Martin	3
David Taylor	9
John Parrott	7
Steve Longworth	9
Paul Medati	7
Jimmy White	9
Neal Foulds	7

Quarter-final
Steve Davis	9
John Virgo	2
Tony Meo	9
Dean Reynolds	4
Tony Knowles	9
David Taylor	2
Steve Longworth	9
Jimmy White	5

Semi-final
Steve Davis	9
Tony Meo	8
Tony Knowles	9
Steve Longworth	6

Final
Steve Davis	9
Tony Knowles	2
