= 1985 World Doubles Championship =

Professional snooker tournament

Hofmeister World Doubles
Tournament information
- Dates: 4–15 December 1985
- Venue: Derngate
- City: Northampton
- Country: England
- Format: Non-ranking event
- Winner's share: £40,000
- Highest break: 174 Davis/Meo (combined)

Final
- Champion: Davis/Meo
- Runner-up: Reardon/Jones
- Score: 12–5

The 1985 Hofmeister World Doubles was the fourth staging of the doubles snooker tournament. It was played at the Derngate in Northampton and held between 4 and 15 December 1985 with the tournament televised on ITV.

Defending champions Alex Higgins and Jimmy White's hopes ended at the qualifying stages. Steve Davis and Tony Meo went on to regain the title beating Ray Reardon and Tony Jones who beat Dennis Taylor and Terry Griffiths in the semi-final in by now a three session final as it was with the other ITV snooker tournaments but all sessions of the final were never televised due to a strike by electricians. Davis and Meo also got the highest combined break of 174 in their semi-final match against Cliff Thorburn and Willie Thorne.

== Results ==
Results from the last 16 onwards are shown below. Winning players are denoted in bold.

Last 16; Best of 9 frames
(England) (England) Fowler/West	4
(Australia) (South Africa) **Campbell/Mans**	**5**
(Wales) (England) **Reardon/Jones**	**5**
(England) (England) Taylor/Hallett	0
(Northern Ireland) (Wales) **Taylor/Griffiths**	**5**
(England) (Wales) Spencer/Newbury	0
(England) (England) Knowles/Johnson	4
(Wales) (Wales) **Mountjoy/Jones**	**5**
(England) (England) **Davis/Meo**	**5**
(Republic of Ireland) (England) E. Hughes/M. Smith	4
(Canada) (Australia) Werbeniuk/Charlton	4
(England) (England) **Parrott/Foulds**	**5**
(Canada) (England) **Thorburn/Thorne**	**5**
(Wales) (Australia) Wilson/King	2
(Canada) (England) Stevens/Virgo	3
(South Africa) (South Africa) **S Francisco/P Francisco**	**5**

Quarter-finals; Best of 9 frames
(Australia) (South Africa) Campbell/Mans	4
(Wales) (England) **Reardon/Jones**	**5**
(Northern Ireland) (Wales) **Taylor/Griffiths**	**5**
(Wales) (Wales) Mountjoy/Jones	2
(England) (England) **Davis/Meo**	**5**
(England) (England) Parrott/Foulds	3
(Canada) (England) **Thorburn/Thorne**	**5**
(South Africa) (South Africa) S Francisco/P Francisco	2

Semi-finals; Best of 17 frames
(Wales) (England) **Reardon/Jones**	**9**
(Northern Ireland) (Wales) Taylor/Griffiths	6
(England) (England) **Davis/Meo**	**9**
(Canada) (England) Thorburn/Thorne	6

Final; Best of 23 frames
(Wales) (England) Reardon/Jones	5
(England) (England) **Davis/Meo**	**12**

== Selected earlier results ==
Played in Birmingham 6–7 November 1985

First Round

(England) (Australia) Cripsey/Wilkinson	5–2	(England) (England) Houlihan/Bennett

Sccond Round

(Scotland) (Scotland) Rea/McLaughlin	5–0	(England) (England) G. Foulds/Scott
(England) (England) Fowler/West	5– 4	(Canada) (Canada) Chaperon/Gauvreau
(England) (England) Williamson/Duggan	5– 1	(England) (England) Gilbert/Harris

Last 32

(England) (England) Fowler/West	5– 4	(Northern Ireland) (England) Higgins/White
(Australia) (South Africa) Campbell/Mans	5– 3	(England) (Scotland) Martin/MacLeod
(Wales) (England) Reardon/Jones	5–3	(England) (Australia) Cripsey/Wilkinson
(England) (England) Hallett/David Taylor	5– 4	(England) (Republic of Ireland) Medati/Browne
(Wales) (Northern Ireland) Griffiths/Dennis Taylor	5– 4	(England) (England) Wildman/Edmonds
(England) (Wales) Spencer/Newbury	5– 4	(England) (Northern Ireland) Bales/McLaughlin
(England) (England) Knowles/Johnson	5–2	(Northern Ireland) (Republic of Ireland) Murphy/Fagan
(Wales) (Wales) Mountjoy/W.Jones	5– 2	(England) (England) Bradley/Chalmers
(England) (England) S. Davis/Meo	5– 2	(England) (England) Williams/Miles
(Republic of Ireland) (England) Hughes/Smith	5–4	(Scotland) (Scotland) Rea/McLaughlin
(Canada) (Australia) Werbeniuk/Charlton	5– 4	(England) (Canada) Dodd/Bear
(England) (England) N. Foulds/Parrott	5–1	(Scotland) (Wales) Donnelly/Roscoe
(Canada) (England) Thorburn/Thorne	5– 1	(Wales) (Canada) Chappel/Jonik
(Wales) (Australia) Wilson/King	5– 3	(England) (England) Williamson/Duggan
(South Africa) (South Africa) S. Francisco/P. Francisco	5–0	(England) (England) F. Davis/Watterson
(Canada) (England) Stevens/Virgo	5– 0	(England) (England) Reynolds/Longworth
