= 1986 International Open =

1986 BCE International Open
Tournament information
- Dates: 26 September – 5 October 1986
- Venue: Trentham Gardens
- City: Stoke-on-Trent
- Country: England
- Organisation: WPBSA
- Format: Ranking event
- Total prize fund: £175,000
- Winner's share: £35,000
- Highest break: Cliff Thorburn (CAN) (116)

Final
- Champion: Neal Foulds (ENG)
- Runner-up: Cliff Thorburn (CAN)
- Score: 12–9

The 1986 International Open (officially the 1986 BCE International Open) was a professional ranking snooker tournament that took place between 26 September and 5 October 1986 at Trentham Gardens in Stoke-on-Trent, England.

Neal Foulds won his only ranking title by defeating Cliff Thorburn 12–9 in the final. Foulds defeated his father, Geoff, 5–0 in 70 minutes in their last-32 match. This was the only time a father and son have faced each other in a ranking event until Peter and Oliver Lines played each other in the 2021 WST Pro Series. Additionally, Peter Francisco beat his uncle Silvinho in the quarter-finals.

== Main draw ==
Last 64; Best of 9 frames
(Canada) Cliff Thorburn	5
(Republic of Ireland) Pascal Burke	0
(Canada) Jim Wych	5
(England) Malcolm Bradley	2
(Wales) Terry Griffiths	5
(England) Paul Medati	3
(England) Barry West	5
(South Africa) Jimmy van Rensberg	3
(England) Roger Bales	5
(Canada) Kirk Stevens	3
(Wales) Cliff Wilson	5
(Northern Ireland) Jack McLaughlin	2
(England) Tony Knowles	5
(England) John Spencer	0
(Australia) Eddie Charlton	5
(Scotland) Ian Black	0
(Northern Ireland) Alex Higgins	5
(Scotland) Eddie Sinclair	3
(South Africa) Peter Francisco	5
(England) Mark Wildman	2
(Wales) Ray Reardon	5
(Wales) Wayne Jones	4
(Canada) Marcel Gauvreau	5
(Scotland) Murdo MacLeod	4
(South Africa) Silvino Francisco	5
(Wales) Steve Newbury	4
(England) John Virgo	5
(Wales) Mark Bennett	1
(Northern Ireland) Dennis Taylor	5
(Australia) Robby Foldvari	1
(Scotland) Stephen Hendry	5
(England) John Parrott	3
(England) Steve Davis	5
(Scotland) John Rea	1
(Australia) Warren King	5
(England) Steve Longworth	0
(England) Rex Williams	5
(Northern Ireland) Joe O'Boye	0
(England) Steve Duggan	5
(Australia) John Campbell	3
(England) Pat Houlihan	5
(England) Tony Meo	4
(Republic of Ireland) Eugene Hughes	5
(Wales) Tony Chappel	4
(Malta) Tony Drago	5
(England) Willie Thorne	2
(Canada) Bob Chaperon	5
(England) Dave Martin	4
(England) Ken Owers	5
(England) Jimmy White	2
(New Zealand) Dene O'Kane	5
(England) Mike Hallett	1
(England) Neal Foulds	5
(England) Graham Miles	2
(England) Geoff Foulds	5
(Canada) Bill Werbeniuk	2
(Wales) Doug Mountjoy	5
(Scotland) Matt Gibson	3
(England) Dean Reynolds	5
(England) Les Dodd	2
(England) Joe Johnson	5
(Northern Ireland) Tommy Murphy	4
(England) David Taylor	5
(England) Ray Edmonds	4

Last 32; Best of 9 frames
(Canada) Cliff Thorburn	5
(Canada) Jim Wych	3
(Wales) Terry Griffiths	5
(England) Barry West	1
(England) Roger Bales	1
(Wales) Cliff Wilson	5
(England) Tony Knowles	5
(Australia) Eddie Charlton	1
(Northern Ireland) Alex Higgins	4
(South Africa) Peter Francisco	5
(Wales) Ray Reardon	2
(Canada) Marcel Gauvreau	5
(South Africa) Silvino Francisco	5
(England) John Virgo	0
(Northern Ireland) Dennis Taylor	5
(Scotland) Stephen Hendry	3
(England) Steve Davis	5
(Australia) Warren King	4
(England) Rex Williams	5
(England) Steve Duggan	4
(England) Pat Houlihan	1
(Republic of Ireland) Eugene Hughes	5
(Malta) Tony Drago	1
(Canada) Bob Chaperon	5
(England) Ken Owers	5
(New Zealand) Dene O'Kane	0
(England) Neal Foulds	5
(England) Geoff Foulds	0
(Wales) Doug Mountjoy	2
(England) Dean Reynolds	5
(England) Joe Johnson	3
(England) David Taylor	5

Last 16; Best of 9 frames
(Canada) Cliff Thorburn	5
(Wales) Terry Griffiths	4
(Wales) Cliff Wilson	5
(England) Tony Knowles	4
(South Africa) Peter Francisco	5
(Canada) Marcel Gauvreau	2
(South Africa) Silvino Francisco	5
(Northern Ireland) Dennis Taylor	0
(England) Steve Davis	5
(England) Rex Williams	4
(Republic of Ireland) Eugene Hughes	5
(Canada) Bob Chaperon	0
(England) Ken Owers	1
(England) Neal Foulds	5
(England) Dean Reynolds	5
(England) David Taylor	1

Quarter-finals; Best of 9 frames
(Canada) Cliff Thorburn	5
(Wales) Cliff Wilson	1
(South Africa) Peter Francisco	5
(South Africa) Silvino Francisco	3
(England) Steve Davis	4
(Republic of Ireland) Eugene Hughes	5
(England) Neal Foulds	5
(England) Dean Reynolds	2

Semi-finals; Best of 17 frames
(Canada) Cliff Thorburn	9
(South Africa) Peter Francisco	7
(Republic of Ireland) Eugene Hughes	8
(England) Neal Foulds	9

Final; Best of 23 frames
(Canada) Cliff Thorburn	9
(England) Neal Foulds	12
