= 1987 English Professional Championship =

English Professional Championship
Tournament information
- Dates: 6–11 February 1987
- Venue: Corn Exchange
- City: Ipswich
- Country: England
- Format: Non-ranking event
- Total prize fund: £86,000
- Winner's share: £20,000
- Highest break: Tony Meo (125)

Final
- Champion: Tony Meo
- Runner-up: Les Dodd
- Score: 9–5

The 1987 Tolly Ales English Professional Championship was a professional non-ranking snooker tournament, which took place between 6 and 11 February 1987 at the Corn Exchange in Ipswich, England.

Tony Meo won the title by defeating Les Dodd 9–5 in the final.

== Main draw ==
Last 32 was played at Bristol between 16 and 17 December 1986.

Last 32; Best of 11 frames
Tony Meo	6
Steve Duggan	3
Danny Fowler	6
Malcolm Bradley	3
John Parrott	6
Mark Wildman	1
John Virgo	6
Paul Medati	1
Willie Thorne	6
Bob Harris	2
Dave Martin	6
John Spencer	5
Dean Reynolds	6
Ray Edmonds	3
Jimmy White	6
Graham Cripsey	4
Les Dodd	6
Tony Knowles	2
Barry West	6
Vic Harris	3
Mike Hallett	6
Ian Williamson	2
Ken Owers	6
Neal Foulds	3
Joe Johnson	6
Graham Miles	3
Steve James	6
Steve Longworth	2
Rex Williams	6
Tony Jones	4
David Taylor	6
Jack Fitzmaurice	1

Last 16; Best of 11 frames
Tony Meo	6
Danny Fowler	0
John Parrott	6
John Virgo	2
Willie Thorne	6
Dave Martin	3
Dean Reynolds	6
Jimmy White	5
Les Dodd	6
Barry West	3
Mike Hallett	6
Ken Owers	2
Joe Johnson	6
Steve James	3
Rex Williams	6
David Taylor	2

Quarter-final; Best of 11 frames
Tony Meo	6
John Parrott	3
Willie Thorne	6
Dean Reynolds	4
Les Dodd	9
Mike Hallett	5
Joe Johnson	6
Rex Williams	5

Semi-final; Best of 17 frames
Tony Meo	9
Willie Thorne	3
Les Dodd	9
Joe Johnson	5

Final; Best of 17 frames
Tony Meo	9
Les Dodd	5
