= 1985 Matchroom Trophy =

1985 Goya Matchroom Trophy
Tournament information
- Dates: 23 September – 6 October 1985
- Venue: Trentham Gardens
- City: Stoke-on-Trent
- Country: England
- Organisation: WPBSA
- Format: Ranking event
- Winner's share: £35,000

Final
- Champion: Cliff Thorburn (CAN)
- Runner-up: Jimmy White (ENG)
- Score: 12–10

The 1985 Matchroom Trophy (officially the 1985 Goya Matchroom Trophy) was a professional ranking snooker tournament that took place between 23 September to 6 October 1985 at Trentham Gardens in Stoke-on-Trent, England.

Cliff Thorburn won the tournament defeating Jimmy White 12–10 in the final having trailed 0–7. The defending champion Steve Davis was defeated by White in the quarter-finals.

== Main draw ==
Last 64; Best of 9 frames
(Canada) Cliff Thorburn	5
(England) Steve Longworth	3
(England) Dave Martin	5
(Scotland) Eddie Sinclair	1
(Australia) John Campbell	5
(Canada) Mario Morra	2
(Wales) Doug Mountjoy	5
(Canada) Jim Wych	1
(England) Steve Duggan	5
(Wales) Ray Reardon	4
(Scotland) Ian Black	5
(South Africa) Perrie Mans	4
(England) Willie Thorne	5
(England) Danny Fowler	1
(England) George Scott	5
(England) Mark Wildman	1
(Northern Ireland) Dennis Taylor	5
(England) Graham Cripsey	1
(England) Bob Harris	5
(New Zealand) Dene O'Kane	3
(Northern Ireland) Alex Higgins	5
(England) Dennis Hughes	1
(Northern Ireland) Tommy Murphy	5
(Republic of Ireland) Eugene Hughes	3
(England) John Parrott	5
(Wales) Wayne Jones	3
(England) Tony Meo	5
(England) John Dunning	0
(Wales) Terry Griffiths	5
(Wales) Steve Newbury	2
(England) John Spencer	5
(Australia) Robby Foldvari	4
(England) Jimmy White	5
(Republic of Ireland) Patsy Fagan	2
(Australia) Warren King	5
(England) Rex Williams	3
(England) Dean Reynolds	5
(Canada) Bernie Mikkelsen	0
(Scotland) Matt Gibson	5
(Australia) Eddie Charlton	4
(England) Steve Davis	5
(England) Roger Bales	2
(England) John Virgo	5
(England) Graham Miles	2
(Scotland) Murdo MacLeod	5
(England) Jack Fitzmaurice	1
(Canada) Bob Chaperon	5
(South Africa) Silvino Francisco	3
(England) Neal Foulds	5
(England) Les Dodd	3
(England) Tony Knowles	5
(Scotland) Eddie McLaughlin	1
(England) David Taylor	5
(England) Tony Jones	4
(Canada) Bill Werbeniuk	5
(England) Ian Williamson	2
(England) Joe Johnson	5
(Canada) Jim Bear	1
(England) Malcolm Bradley	5
(England) Mike Hallett	4
(Wales) Cliff Wilson	5
(Wales) Colin Roscoe	1
(Wales) Tony Chappel	5
(Canada) Kirk Stevens	3

Last 32; Best of 9 frames
(Canada) Cliff Thorburn	5
(England) Dave Martin	3
(Australia) John Campbell	5
(Wales) Doug Mountjoy	1
(England) Steve Duggan	5
(Scotland) Ian Black	1
(England) Willie Thorne	5
(England) George Scott	1
(Northern Ireland) Dennis Taylor	5
(England) Bob Harris	3
(Northern Ireland) Alex Higgins	5
(Northern Ireland) Tommy Murphy	2
(England) John Parrott	5
(England) Tony Meo	4
(Wales) Terry Griffiths	5
(England) John Spencer	1
(England) Jimmy White	5
(Australia) Warren King	2
(England) Dean Reynolds	5
(Scotland) Matt Gibson	0
(England) Steve Davis	5
(England) John Virgo	1
(Scotland) Murdo MacLeod	5
(Canada) Bob Chaperon	4
(England) Neal Foulds	5
(England) Tony Knowles	3
(England) David Taylor	5
(Canada) Bill Werbeniuk	4
(England) Joe Johnson	5
(England) Malcolm Bradley	2
(Wales) Cliff Wilson	5
(Wales) Tony Chappel	0

Last 16; Best of 9 frames
(Canada) Cliff Thorburn	5
(Australia) John Campbell	0
(England) Steve Duggan	5
(England) Willie Thorne	4
(Northern Ireland) Dennis Taylor	5
(Northern Ireland) Alex Higgins	1
(England) John Parrott	5
(Wales) Terry Griffiths	1
(England) Jimmy White	5
(England) Dean Reynolds	1
(England) Steve Davis	5
(Scotland) Murdo MacLeod	1
(England) Neal Foulds	5
(England) David Taylor	4
(England) Joe Johnson	5
(Wales) Cliff Wilson	1

Quarter-finals; Best of 9 frames
(Canada) Cliff Thorburn	5
(England) Steve Duggan	2
(Northern Ireland) Dennis Taylor	5
(England) John Parrott	1
(England) Jimmy White	5
(England) Steve Davis	3
(England) Neal Foulds	5
(England) Joe Johnson	3

Semi-finals; Best of 17 frames
(Canada) Cliff Thorburn	9
(Northern Ireland) Dennis Taylor	5
(England) Jimmy White	9
(England) Neal Foulds	5

Final; Best of 23 frames
(Canada) Cliff Thorburn	12
(England) Jimmy White	10
