= 1989 British Open =

1989 Anglian Windows British Open
Tournament information
- Dates: 19 February – 5 March 1989
- Venue: Assembly Rooms
- City: Derby
- Country: England
- Organisation: WPBSA
- Format: Ranking event
- Total prize fund: £350,000
- Winner's share: £70,000
- Highest break: Mark Johnston-Allen (ENG) (140)

Final
- Champion: Tony Meo (ENG)
- Runner-up: Dean Reynolds (ENG)
- Score: 13–6

The 1989 British Open (officially the 1989 Anglian Windows British Open) was a professional ranking snooker tournament, that was held from 19 February to 5 March 1989 with television coverage beginning on 25 February at the Assembly Rooms in Derby, England.

Tony Meo would win his only ranking event in snooker, defeating Dean Reynolds 13 frames to 6 in the Final.

== Main draw ==
Last 64; Best of 9 frames
(Scotland) Stephen Hendry	5
(England) Craig Edwards	0
(New Zealand) Dene O'Kane	5
(England) Tony Jones	4
(England) Tony Meo	5
(Wales) Mark Bennett	1
(Northern Ireland) Dennis Taylor	4
(Wales) Colin Roscoe	5
(South Africa) Peter Francisco	5
(Australia) John Campbell	2
(England) Rex Williams	2
(England) David Roe	5
(England) Tony Knowles	5
(Canada) Jim Wych	2
(England) Barry West	5
(England) Ian Graham	1
(Canada) Cliff Thorburn	5
(Republic of Ireland) Paddy Browne	0
(Australia) Eddie Charlton	3
(Wales) Darren Morgan	5
(England) Mike Hallett	5
(England) Nigel Gilbert	3
(Wales) Steve Newbury	3
(England) Roger Bales	5
(England) Neal Foulds	5
(Wales) Ray Reardon	1
(England) John Spencer	1
(Canada) Alain Robidoux	5
(England) John Virgo	5
(England) Danny Fowler	2
(England) David Taylor	2
(England) Martin Clark	5
(England) Joe Johnson	5
(England) Terry Whitthread	2
(Malta) Tony Drago	5
(Canada) Jim Bear	2
(Republic of Ireland) Eugene Hughes	5
(Wales) Wayne Jones	2
(Wales) Terry Griffiths	1
(England) Mark Johnston-Allen	5
(England) Jimmy White	5
(England) Pat Houlihan	3
(England) Dean Reynolds	5
(England) Les Dodd	2
(Wales) Cliff Wilson	5
(Scotland) John Rea	2
(England) Steve James	3
(Wales) Tony Chappel	5
(England) John Parrott	5
(England) Jon Wright	1
(England) Steve Longworth	5
(England) Ken Owers	1
(Wales) Doug Mountjoy	5
(Canada) Marcel Gauvreau	0
(South Africa) Silvino Francisco	4
(Scotland) Murdo MacLeod	5
(England) Willie Thorne	5
(England) Gary Wilkinson	1
(Canada) Bob Chaperon	2
(England) Robert Marshall	5
(England) Steve Davis	5
(England) Graham Cripsey	1
(Northern Ireland) Alex Higgins	5
(Australia) Robby Foldvari	1

Last 32; Best of 9 frames
(Scotland) Stephen Hendry	5
(New Zealand) Dene O'Kane	2
(England) Tony Meo	5
(Wales) Colin Roscoe	3
(South Africa) Peter Francisco	5
(England) David Roe	3
(England) Tony Knowles	0
(England) Barry West	5
(Canada) Cliff Thorburn	5
(Wales) Darren Morgan	4
(England) Mike Hallett	5
(England) Roger Bales	0
(England) Neal Foulds	5
(Canada) Alain Robidoux	1
(England) John Virgo	1
(England) Martin Clark	5
(England) Joe Johnson	5
(Malta) Tony Drago	3
(Republic of Ireland) Eugene Hughes	2
(England) Mark Johnston-Allen	5
(England) Jimmy White	w/d
(England) Dean Reynolds	w/o
(Wales) Cliff Wilson	5
(Wales) Tony Chappel	3
(England) John Parrott	5
(England) Steve Longworth	1
(Wales) Doug Mountjoy	5
(Scotland) Murdo MacLeod	0
(England) Willie Thorne	5
(England) Robert Marshall	1
(England) Steve Davis	5
(Northern Ireland) Alex Higgins	0

Last 16; Best of 9 frames
(Scotland) Stephen Hendry	3
(England) Tony Meo	5
(South Africa) Peter Francisco	5
(England) Barry West	1
(Canada) Cliff Thorburn	4
(England) Mike Hallett	5
(England) Neal Foulds	4
(England) Martin Clark	5
(England) Joe Johnson	5
(England) Mark Johnston-Allen	2
(England) Dean Reynolds	5
(Wales) Cliff Wilson	0
(England) John Parrott	5
(Wales) Doug Mountjoy	2
(England) Willie Thorne	0
(England) Steve Davis	5

Quarter-finals; Best of 9 frames
(England) Tony Meo	5
(South Africa) Peter Francisco	3
(England) Mike Hallett	5
(England) Martin Clark	3
(England) Joe Johnson	4
(England) Dean Reynolds	5
(England) John Parrott	5
(England) Steve Davis	1

Semi-finals; Best of 17 frames
(England) Tony Meo	9
(England) Mike Hallett	8
(England) Dean Reynolds	9
(England) John Parrott	8

Final; Best of 25 frames
(England) Tony Meo	13
(England) Dean Reynolds	6

== Final ==
Final: Best of 25 frames. Referee: Assembly Rooms, Derby, England. 4 and 5 March 1989.
Tony Meo; England	13–6	Dean Reynolds; England
Afternoon: 63–38, 33–82, 101–29 (84), 54–20, 66–58, 65–27, 11–82; Evening: 63–22, 34–74 (53), 74–17, 60–50, 67–15, 43–58, 65–60; Afternoon:, 19–73 (53), 41–60, 71–51, 60–7, 59–54,
84	Highest break	53 (x2)
0	Century breaks	0
1	50+ breaks	2
