= 1986 English Professional Championship =

English Professional Championship
Tournament information
- Dates: 4–12 February 1986
- Venue: Corn Exchange
- City: Ipswich
- Country: England
- Format: Non-ranking event
- Total prize fund: £18,500

Final
- Champion: Tony Meo
- Runner-up: Neal Foulds
- Score: 9–7

The 1986 Tolly Cobbold English Professional Championship was a professional non-ranking snooker tournament that took place in February 1986 in Ipswich, England.

Tony Meo won the title by defeating Neal Foulds 9–7 in the final.

== Main draw ==
The Last 32 and 16 were played between 20 and 24 January 1986 at Bristol.

Last 32; Best of 17 frames
Tony Meo	9
George Scott	1
Mark Wildman	9
Graham Cripsey	5
Dean Reynolds	9
Steve Longworth	5
Willie Thorne	9
Paul Medati	2
Steve Davis	9
Malcolm Bradley	3
Dave Martin	9
Fred Davis	8
John Virgo	9
Tony Jones	7
John Parrott	9
Bill Oliver	0
Neal Foulds	9
Geoff Foulds	4
Ray Edmonds	9
David Taylor	6
Jimmy White	9
Ian Williamson	1
Rex Williams	9
Graham Miles	6
Mike Hallett	9
Dave Chalmers	1
Tony Knowles	9
Roger Bales	4
Joe Johnson	9
Danny Fowler	7
John Spencer	9
Pat Houlihan	5

Last 16; Best of 17 frames
Tony Meo	9
Mark Wildman	3
Dean Reynolds	9
Willie Thorne	8
Steve Davis	9
Dave Martin	4
John Virgo	9
John Parrott	6
Neal Foulds	9
Ray Edmonds	4
Jimmy White	9
Rex Williams	5
Mike Hallett	9
Tony Knowles	5
Joe Johnson	9
John Spencer	7

Quarter-final; Best of 17 frames
Tony Meo	9
Dean Reynolds	4
Steve Davis	9
John Virgo	2
Neal Foulds	9
Jimmy White	4
Mike Hallett	9
Joe Johnson	6

Semi-final; Best of 17 frames
Tony Meo	9
Steve Davis	7
Neal Foulds	9
Mike Hallett	8

Final; Best of 17 frames
Tony Meo	9
Neal Foulds	7
