= 1988 International Open =

1988 Fidelity Unit Trusts International Open
Tournament information
- Dates: 25 August – 11 September 1988
- Venue: Trentham Gardens
- City: Stoke-on-Trent
- Country: England
- Organisation: WPBSA
- Format: Ranking event
- Winner's share: £45,000

Final
- Champion: Steve Davis (ENG)
- Runner-up: Jimmy White (ENG)
- Score: 12–6

The 1988 International Open (officially the 1988 Fidelity Unit Trusts International Open) was a professional ranking snooker tournament that took place from August to September 1988 at Trentham Gardens in Stoke-on-Trent, England.

Steve Davis retained the title by defeating Jimmy White 12–6 in the final. Frame 5 of the match between Tony Drago and Danny Fowler was the fastest frame in the history of professional Snooker, with Drago winning 62–0 after just 3 minutes. In the final, Davis became the first player to achieve 3 century breaks in a row.

== Main draw ==
Last 64; Best of 9 frames
(England) Steve Davis	5
(Wales) Wayne Jones	1
(Canada) Alain Robidoux	5
(Australia) Eddie Charlton	2
(Scotland) John Rea	5
(South Africa) Peter Francisco	0
(England) David Taylor	5
(Isle of Man) Tony Wilson	1
(Northern Ireland) Dennis Taylor	5
(Wales) Tony Chappel	1
(Australia) John Campbell	w/o
(Canada) Kirk Stevens	w/d
(Canada) Jim Wych	5
(Wales) Terry Griffiths	0
(New Zealand) Dene O'Kane	5
(England) Mark Johnston-Allen	3
(England) Mike Hallett	5
(Northern Ireland) Joe O'Boye	3
(England) Tony Meo	5
(England) Nigel Gilbert	1
(South Africa) Silvino Francisco	5
(England) Ken Owers	1
(Canada) Bob Chaperon	5
(England) Mick Fisher	3
(Scotland) Murdo MacLeod	5
(Northern Ireland) Alex Higgins	2
(England) Steve James	5
(England) Jon Wright	3
(Scotland) Stephen Hendry	5
(England) Ray Edmonds	1
(England) Steve Longworth	5
(England) Mick Price	4
(England) Neal Foulds	5
(Northern Ireland) Tommy Murphy	3
(England) Dean Reynolds	5
(England) Tony Jones	4
(England) John Virgo	5
(Northern Ireland) Jack McLaughlin	0
(England) John Spencer	5
(Wales) Ray Reardon	4
(England) Joe Johnson	5
(England) Graham Cripsey	3
(Wales) Doug Mountjoy	5
(England) Dave Martin	1
(England) Tony Knowles	5
(England) Graham Miles	4
(Wales) Steve Newbury	5
(Wales) Mark Bennett	0
(England) Les Dodd	5
(England) John Parrott	4
(England) Barry West	5
(Australia) Warren King	4
(England) Steve Duggan	5
(Wales) Cliff Wilson	2
(England) Rex Williams	5
(England) David Roe	3
(England) Willie Thorne	5
(England) Jim Chambers	2
(Malta) Tony Drago	5
(England) Danny Fowler	3
(England) Jimmy White	5
(England) Martin Clark	2
(Republic of Ireland) Eugene Hughes	5
(England) Steve Meakin	0

Last 32; Best of 9 frames
(England) Steve Davis	5
(Canada) Alain Robidoux	4
(Scotland) John Rea	4
(England) David Taylor	5
(Northern Ireland) Dennis Taylor	5
(Australia) John Campbell	4
(Canada) Jim Wych	5
(New Zealand) Dene O'Kane	4
(England) Mike Hallett	3
(England) Tony Meo	5
(South Africa) Silvino Francisco	2
(Canada) Bob Chaperon	5
(Scotland) Murdo MacLeod	2
(England) Steve James	5
(Scotland) Stephen Hendry	5
(England) Steve Longworth	3
(England) Neal Foulds	3
(England) Dean Reynolds	5
(England) John Virgo	1
(England) John Spencer	5
(England) Joe Johnson	5
(Wales) Doug Mountjoy	4
(England) Tony Knowles	4
(Wales) Steve Newbury	5
(England) Les Dodd	3
(England) Barry West	5
(England) Steve Duggan	4
(England) Rex Williams	5
(England) Willie Thorne	5
(Malta) Tony Drago	2
(England) Jimmy White	5
(Republic of Ireland) Eugene Hughes	1

Last 16; Best of 9 frames
(England) Steve Davis	5
(England) David Taylor	1
(Northern Ireland) Dennis Taylor	5
(Canada) Jim Wych	2
(England) Tony Meo	5
(Canada) Bob Chaperon	4
(England) Steve James	5
(Scotland) Stephen Hendry	2
(England) Dean Reynolds	5
(England) John Spencer	2
(England) Joe Johnson	5
(Wales) Steve Newbury	2
(England) Barry West	5
(England) Rex Williams	4
(England) Willie Thorne	4
(England) Jimmy White	5

Quarter-finals; Best of 9 frames
(England) Steve Davis	5
(Northern Ireland) Dennis Taylor	2
(England) Tony Meo	1
(England) Steve James	5
(England) Dean Reynolds	5
(England) Joe Johnson	1
(England) Barry West	2
(England) Jimmy White	5

Semi-finals; Best of 17 frames
(England) Steve Davis	9
(England) Steve James	1
(England) Dean Reynolds	5
(England) Jimmy White	9

Final; Best of 23 frames
(England) Steve Davis	12
(England) Jimmy White	6
