= 1990 Matchroom League =

Stormseal Matchroom League
Tournament information
- Dates: 25 January – 20 May 1990
- Organisation: Matchroom Sport
- Format: Non-ranking event
- Total prize fund: £220,000
- Winner's share: £70,000
- Highest break: John Parrott (ENG) (142)

Final
- Champion: Steve Davis (ENG)
- Runner-up: Stephen Hendry (SCO)
- Score: Round-Robin

The 1990 Stormseal Matchroom League was a professional non-ranking snooker tournament that was played from 25 January to 20 May 1990. It featured ten players with seven from the Matchroom stable minus Terry Griffiths after being relegated the previous year along with Alex Higgins. Dennis Taylor returned to the league this year along with Doug Mountjoy who competed for the first time. Matches were played around sports and leisure centres and town halls exclusively across the UK this year while there was a Matchroom International League played across venues in some European countries which featured six players competing including Higgins and Griffiths.

Steve Davis topped the table and won the tournament for the fourth time.

== Prize fund ==
The breakdown of prize money for this year is shown below:

- Winner: £70,000
- Runner-up: £30,000
- 3rd place: £25,000
- 4th place: £20,000
- 5th Place: £17,000
- 6th Place: £15,000
- 7th Place: £13,000
- 8th Place: £11,000
- 9th Place: £9,000
- 10th Place: £5,000
- Highest break: £5,000
- Total: £220,000

== League phase ==
Ranking		(England) DAV	(Scotland) HEN	(England) THO	(Wales) MOU	(Northern Ireland) TAY	(England) WHI	(England) FOU	(England) MEO	(England) PAR	(Canada) THO	Frame W-L	Match W-D-L	Pld-Pts
Winner	Steve Davis	x	2	7	5	6	4	5	5	4	6	44–28	6–2–1	9–20
Runner-up	Stephen Hendry	6	x	5	5	4	3	6	3	3	6	41–31	5–1–3	9–16
3	Willie Thorne	1	3	x	4	5	4	5	6	4	6	38–34	4–3–2	9–15
4	Doug Mountjoy	3	3	4	x	4	5	6	5	5	2	37–35	4–2–3	9–14
5	Dennis Taylor	2	4	3	4	x	6	0	6	4	5	34–38	3–3–3	9–12
6	Neal Foulds	3	2	3	2	8	4	x	3	7	5	37–35	3–1–5	9–10
6	Jimmy White	4	5	4	3	2	x	4	4	5	1	32–40	2–4–3	9–10
8	Tony Meo	3	5	2	3	2	4	5	x	2	5	31–41	3–1–5	9–10
9	Cliff Thorburn	2	2	2	6	3	7	3	3	5	x	33–39	3–0–6	9–9
10	John Parrott	4	5	4	3	4	3	1	6	x	3	33–39	2–3–4	9–9

If points were level then match wins, followed by most frames won determined their positions. If two players had an identical record then the result in their match determined their positions. If that ended 4–4 then the player who got to four first was higher.

- 25 January – The Hawth, Crawley
  - Stephen Hendry 5–3 Willie Thorne
- 27 January – Medway Arts Centre, Chatham
  - Neal Foulds 5–3 Cliff Thorburn
  - Doug Mountjoy 5–3 Tony Meo
- 28 January – St David's Hall, Cardiff
  - Tony Meo 5–3 Neal Foulds
  - Steve Davis 7–1 Willie Thorne
- 2 February – Warwick Arts Centre, Coventry
  - Dennis Taylor 4–4 Stephen Hendry
- 3 February – Gateshead Lesuire Centre, Gateshead
  - Dennis Taylor 6–2 Tony Meo
  - Stephen Hendry 6–2 Cliff Thorburn
- 14 February – Central Hall, York
  - Jimmy White 4–4 Willie Thorne
- 15 February – Town Hall, St Helens
  - Cliff Thorburn 5–3 John Parrott
- 17 February – Aberdeen Exhibition and Conference Centre, Aberdeen
  - Neal Foulds 7–1 John Parrott
  - Jimmy White 4–4 Steve Davis
- 23 March – The Dome, Morecambe
  - Willie Thorne 6–2 Tony Meo
- 25 March – Sands Centre, Carlisle
  - Doug Mountjoy 4–4 Willie Thorne
  - Jimmy White 5–3 John Parrott
- 5 April – Thornaby Pavilion, Thornaby-on-Tees
  - Steve Davis 6–2 Cliff Thorburn
- 6 April – Parr Hall, Warrington
  - Stephen Hendry 6–2 Neal Foulds
- 7 April – Metrodome Leisure Complex, Barnsley
  - Neal Foulds 8–0 Dennis Taylor
  - Stephen Hendry 5–3 Doug Mountjoy
- 8 April – Octagon Theatre, Bolton
  - Willie Thorne 6–2 Cliff Thorburn
  - Dennis Taylor 4–4 John Parrott
- 2 May – The Bowl, Redcar
  - Steve Davis 5–3 Doug Mountjoy
- 3 May – Northgate Arena Leisure Centre, Chester
  - Steve Davis 5–3 Neal Foulds
- 4 May – Castle Leisure Centre, Bury
  - John Parrott 5–3 Stephen Hendry
- 5 May – The Dome, Doncaster
  - Willie Thorne 5–3 Neal Foulds
  - Steve Davis 5–3 Tony Meo
- 6 May – Fairfield Halls, Croydon
  - Tony Meo 5–3 Cliff Thorburn
  - Steve Davis 4–4 John Parrott
- 7 May – New Victoria Theatre, Newcastle-under-Lyme
  - Willie Thorne 4–4 John Parrott
  - Cliff Thorburn 7–1 Jimmy White
- 8 May – Taliesin Arts Centre, Swansea University, Swansea
  - Doug Mountjoy 4–4 Dennis Taylor
- 10 May – Walsall Council House, Walsall
  - Jimmy White 4–4 Neal Foulds
- 11 May – Queensway Hall, Dunstable
  - Doug Mountjoy 5–3 Jimmy White
- 12 May – Meadowside Centre, Burton upon Trent
  - Doug Mountjoy 6–2 Neal Foulds
  - Tony Meo 5–3 Stephen Hendry
- 13 May – Harrogate International Centre, Harrogate
  - Doug Mountjoy 5–3 John Parrott
  - Steve Davis 6–2 Dennis Taylor
- 14 May – Oldham Sports Centre, Oldham
  - Jimmy White 5–3 Stephen Hendry
- 16 May – The Floral Hall, Southport
  - Dennis Taylor 6–2 Jimmy White
- 17 May – Burnley Mechanics Theatre, Burnley
  - Willie Thorne 5–3 Dennis Taylor
- 18 May – Stoke Rochford Hall, near Grantham
  - Dennis Taylor 5–3 Cliff Thorburn
- 19 May – Watford Town Hall, Watford
  - Cliff Thorburn 6–2 Doug Mountjoy
  - Tony Meo 4–4 Jimmy White
- 20 May – Brentwood International Centre, Brentwood
  - John Parrott 6–2 Tony Meo
  - Stephen Hendry 6–2 Steve Davis
