= 1988 Classic (snooker) =

1987 Classic
Tournament information
- Dates: 1–10 January 1988
- Venue: Norbreck Castle Hotel
- City: Blackpool
- Country: England
- Organisation: WPBSA
- Format: Ranking event
- Total prize fund: £250,000
- Winner's share: £50,000
- Highest break: Dennis Taylor (NIR) (132)

Final
- Champion: Steve Davis (ENG)
- Runner-up: John Parrott (ENG)
- Score: 13–11

The 1988 Mercantile Credit Classic was the ninth edition of the professional snooker tournament which took place from 1–10 January 1988. The tournament was played at the Norbreck Castle Hotel, Blackpool, Lancashire. Steve Davis won his fifth Classic title, beating John Parrott 13–11 in the final.

== Main draw ==
First Round; Best of 9 frames
(England) Steve Davis	5
(England) Les Dodd	0
(Scotland) Jim Donnelly	5
(Scotland) Murdo MacLeod	4
(Northern Ireland) Alex Higgins	5
(England) Tony Jones	0
(England) Tony Meo	5
(Canada) Mario Morra	1
(South Africa) Silvino Francisco	5
(England) Brian Rowswell	3
(England) Steve Longworth	5
(England) Ray Edmonds	3
(England) Joe Johnson	5
(Wales) Tony Chappel	2
(Scotland) Stephen Hendry	5
(Canada) Bill Werbeniuk	2
(Wales) Terry Griffiths	5
(South Africa) Jimmy van Rensberg	2
(Wales) Cliff Wilson	5
(England) Dave Gilbert	3
(England) Willie Thorne	5
(England) Malcolm Bradley	1
(England) Barry West	5
(England) Bill Oliver	3
(England) Martin Clark	5
(England) Mike Hallett	4
(Wales) Mark Bennett	5
(Canada) Kirk Stevens	2
(Canada) Cliff Thorburn	5
(Wales) Ray Reardon	3
(Wales) Steve Newbury	5
(Republic of Ireland) Eugene Hughes	1
(England) Neal Foulds	5
(Canada) Bob Chaperon	1
(England) John Virgo	5
(Canada) Gino Rigitano	2
(England) John Parrott	5
(England) Mark Wildman	2
(England) David Taylor	5
(England) Martin Smith	3
(England) Ken Owers	5
(England) Rex Williams	3
(South Africa) Peter Francisco	5
(England) Graham Cripsey	2
(Northern Ireland) Dennis Taylor	5
(England) Terry Whitthread	2
(Malta) Tony Drago	5
(England) George Scott	3
(England) Tony Knowles	5
(England) Jon Wright	1
(Wales) Colin Roscoe	5
(Australia) Eddie Charlton	3
(England) Dean Reynolds	5
(Northern Ireland) Joe O'Boye	3
(Northern Ireland) Tommy Murphy	5
(Australia) John Campbell	3
(Wales) Doug Mountjoy	5
(England) Fred Davis	0
(England) Dave Martin	5
(Northern Ireland) Jack McLaughlin	2
(England) Jimmy White	5
(England) Steve James	1
(England) John Spencer	5
(Scotland) John Rea	3

Second Round; Best of 9 frames
(England) Steve Davis	5
(Scotland) Jim Donnelly	0
(Northern Ireland) Alex Higgins	5
(England) Tony Meo	3
(South Africa) Silvino Francisco	5
(England) Steve Longworth	2
(England) Joe Johnson	2
(Scotland) Stephen Hendry	5
(Wales) Terry Griffiths	5
(Wales) Cliff Wilson	2
(England) Willie Thorne	2
(England) Barry West	5
(England) Martin Clark	5
(Wales) Mark Bennett	2
(Canada) Cliff Thorburn	3
(Wales) Steve Newbury	5
(England) Neal Foulds	3
(England) John Virgo	5
(England) John Parrott	5
(England) David Taylor	0
(England) Ken Owers	0
(South Africa) Peter Francisco	5
(Northern Ireland) Dennis Taylor	5
(Malta) Tony Drago	0
(England) Tony Knowles	5
(Wales) Colin Roscoe	0
(England) Dean Reynolds	4
(Northern Ireland) Tommy Murphy	5
(Wales) Doug Mountjoy	4
(England) Dave Martin	5
(England) Jimmy White	5
(England) John Spencer	1

Third Round; Best of 9 frames
(England) Steve Davis	5
(Northern Ireland) Alex Higgins	0
(South Africa) Silvino Francisco	3
(Scotland) Stephen Hendry	5
(Wales) Terry Griffiths	5
(England) Barry West	2
(England) Martin Clark	2
(Wales) Steve Newbury	5
(England) John Virgo	0
(England) John Parrott	5
(South Africa) Peter Francisco	3
(Northern Ireland) Dennis Taylor	5
(England) Tony Knowles	5
(Northern Ireland) Tommy Murphy	3
(England) Dave Martin	5
(England) Jimmy White	2

Quarter-finals; Best of 9 frames
(England) Steve Davis	5
(Scotland) Stephen Hendry	3
(Wales) Terry Griffiths	4
(Wales) Steve Newbury	5
(England) John Parrott	5
(Northern Ireland) Dennis Taylor	1
(England) Tony Knowles	5
(England) Dave Martin	1

Semi-finals; Best of 17 frames
(England) Steve Davis	9
(Wales) Steve Newbury	2
(England) John Parrott	9
(England) Tony Knowles	4

Final; Best of 25 frames
(England) Steve Davis	13
(England) John Parrott	11

== Final ==
Final: Best of 25 frames. Referee: Alan Chamberlain. Norbreck Castle Hotel, Blackpool, England, 9 & 10 January 1988.
Steve Davis; England	13–11	John Parrott; England
First session: 139–0 (99), 31–72, 34–68, 34–76 (69), 61–20, 76–18, 51–65; Second session: 88–47, 79–0 (79), 63–14, 63–12, 66–57, 94–0 (60), 28–64; Third session: 31–107 (103), 74–43, 39–68, 49–58, 9–114 (56), 60–62, 47–67 (58), 99–31 (83), 69–0 (68), 113–4 (99)
99 x2	Highest break	103
0	Century breaks	1
6	50+ breaks	4

== Century breaks ==
(Including qualifying rounds)

- 132 – Dennis Taylor
- 129, 106 – Steve Newbury
- 121 – Bob Chaperon
- 116 – Steve James
- 116 – Dave Martin
- 111 – Joe O'Boye
- 107 – Tony Chappel
- 105 – Steve Davis
- 103, 101 – John Parrott
- 100 – Robby Foldvari
- 100 – David Taylor
