= 1981 Australian Masters =

Australian Masters
Tournament information
- Dates: 25–27 June 1981
- Venue: Tattersalls Club
- City: Sydney
- Country: Australia
- Organisation: WPBSA
- Format: Non-Ranking event
- Total prize fund: $60,000

Final
- Champion: (England) Tony Meo
- Runner-up: (England) John Spencer
- Score: Aggregate Score

The 1981 Winfield Australian Masters was a professional invitational snooker tournament which took place between 25 and 27 June 1981 at the Tattersalls Club in Sydney, Australia.

The tournament was sponsored by Winfield and had a total prize fund of $60,000. There were two qualifying groups, played on a round-robin basis, with the top two players from each group progressing to the semi-finals. The final was decided on aggregated points scored over three frames. The event was recorded for broadcast on Channel 2, with transmissions running from 8 September 1981 to 10 November 1981.

There were four players in each group:

Group A	Group B
(England) John Spencer	(Northern Ireland) Dennis Taylor
(England) Tony Meo	(Canada) Cliff Thorburn
(Wales) Doug Mountjoy	(Australia) Eddie Charlton
(Australia) Paddy Morgan	(Australia) Ian Anderson

Eighteenth-ranked Tony Meo won his first title as a professional by defeating world number fourteen John Spencer over three frames in the final. The winning aggregate score is unknown.
