= English Professional Championship =

Professional snooker tournament

Tournament information
- Venue: Redwood Lodge Hotel & Country Club
- Location: Bristol
- Country: England
- Established: 1981
- Format: Non-ranking event
- Final year: 1989
- Final champion: Mike Hallett

The English Professional Championship was a professional snooker tournament which was open only for English players.

== History ==
The championship was first played in 1981 in Birmingham. Steve Davis won the first title by defeating Tony Meo in the final.

In 1985 the competition was revived again and received financial support from the WPBSA, along with professional championship in Scotland, Wales, Ireland, Canada, Australia and South Africa). After WPBSA financial support ended after the 1988/89 edition, the tournament was unable to find a sponsor has not been held since.

== Winners ==
Year	Winner	Runner-up	Final score	Venue	Season
1981	Steve Davis	Tony Meo	9–3	Birmingham	1980/81
1985	Steve Davis	Tony Knowles	9–2	Ipswich	1984/85
1986	Tony Meo	Neal Foulds	9–7	Ipswich	1985/86
1987	Tony Meo	Les Dodd	9–5	Ipswich	1986/87
1988	Dean Reynolds	Neal Foulds	9–5	Ipswich	1987/88
1989	Mike Hallett	John Parrott	9–7	Bristol	1988/89
