= 1983 Thailand Masters =

Thailand Masters
Tournament information
- Dates: 11–13 August 1983
- Venue: Thai Nippon Stadium
- City: Bangkok
- Country: Thailand
- Organisation: WPBSA
- Format: Non-ranking event

Final
- Champion: (England) Tony Meo
- Runner-up: (England) Steve Davis
- Score: 2–1

The 1983 Thailand Masters, also known as the Bangkok Golden Cue Tournament, was a professional non-ranking snooker tournament held in August 1983 at the Thai Nippon Stadium, Bangkok, Thailand. Tony Meo won the tournament, defeating Steve Davis 2–1 in the final after Davis had taken the first frame. Meo won the deciding frame on the final black.

== Main draw ==
Quarter-finals; Best of 3 frames
(England) Tony Meo	2
(Thailand) Ta Tanyuthitham	0
(Wales) Doug Mountjoy	2
(Thailand) Vichien Saengtong	0

Semi-finals; Best of 3 frames
(England) Tony Meo	2
(Wales) Terry Griffiths	1
(England) Steve Davis	2
(Wales) Doug Mountjoy	1

Final; Best of 3 frames
(England) Tony Meo	2
(England) Steve Davis	1

== Preliminary event ==
In advance of the tournament, a short-format tournament similar to Pot Black was played. In the single-frame round-robin, Meo defeated Griffiths and Davis, Griffiths defeated Mountjoy and Davis, Davis defeated Mountjoy, and Mountjoy defeated Meo. Meo then defeated Griffiths 2–1 in the final.
