= 1990 Grand Prix (snooker) =

Rothmans Grand Prix
Tournament information
- Dates: 8–21 October 1990
- Venue: Hexagon Theatre
- City: Reading
- Country: England
- Organisation: WPBSA
- Format: Ranking event
- Total prize fund: £368,000
- Winner's share: £75,000
- Highest break: Jimmy White (ENG) (140)

Final
- Champion: Stephen Hendry (SCO)
- Runner-up: Nigel Bond (ENG)
- Score: 10–5

The 1990 Rothmans Grand Prix was a professional ranking snooker tournament held at the Hexagon Theatre in Reading, England.

Stephen Hendry won in the final 10–5 against Nigel Bond to which Bond in his second season as a professional reached his first major final after also beating defending champion of the last two years Steve Davis 5–2 in the last 64.

== Main draw ==
Last 64; Best of 9 frames
(England) Nigel Bond	5
(England) Steve Davis	2
(Australia) Eddie Charlton	5
(England) Paul Gibson	2
(England) Willie Thorne	5
(Scotland) Alan McManus	1
(Malta) Tony Drago	5
(England) Rod Lawler	4
(England) Neal Foulds	5
(Scotland) Murdo MacLeod	0
(Wales) Colin Roscoe	5
(England) Joe Johnson	2
(England) Mike Hallett	5
(Northern Ireland) Joe O'Boye	1
(Wales) Wayne Jones	5
(England) Mark Johnston-Allen	1
(England) Ian Graham	5
(Wales) Doug Mountjoy	1
(Wales) Cliff Wilson	5
(England) Chris Cookson	3
(England) Nick Dyson	5
(England) Tony Meo	1
(Republic of Ireland) Eugene Hughes	5
(Canada) Cliff Thorburn	3
(Northern Ireland) Dennis Taylor	5
(Republic of Ireland) Stephen Murphy	0
(England) Gary Wilkinson	5
(England) Graham Miles	1
(England) Jimmy White	5
(Republic of Ireland) Paddy Browne	3
(Wales) Steve Newbury	5
(England) Jason Ferguson	2
(England) John Parrott	5
(Canada) Brady Gollan	2
(England) Barry West	5
(Wales) Mark Bennett	4
(Australia) John Campbell	w/o
(Northern Ireland) Alex Higgins	w/d
(New Zealand) Dene O'Kane	5
(England) Rex Williams	0
(England) Steve James	5
(England) Robert Marshall	1
(England) Jim Chambers	5
(England) Danny Fowler	2
(Wales) Terry Griffiths	5
(England) Roger Bales	3
(Canada) Kirk Stevens	5
(Canada) Bob Chaperon	0
(Wales) Darren Morgan	5
(England) Dean Reynolds	2
(South Africa) Peter Francisco	5
(Canada) Marcel Gauvreau	2
(England) Ken Owers	5
(England) John Virgo	2
(England) Tony Knowles	5
(England) Tony Jones	2
(England) Martin Clark	5
(England) Jason Smith	1
(Canada) Alain Robidoux	5
(England) Nigel Gilbert	2
(Scotland) Stephen Hendry	5
(England) Jon Wright	2
(South Africa) Silvino Francisco	5
(England) Bob Harris	2

Last 32; Best of 9 frames
(England) Nigel Bond	5
(Australia) Eddie Charlton	3
(England) Willie Thorne	5
(Malta) Tony Drago	3
(England) Neal Foulds	5
(Wales) Colin Roscoe	2
(England) Mike Hallett	5
(Wales) Wayne Jones	2
(England) Ian Graham	5
(Wales) Cliff Wilson	3
(England) Nick Dyson	3
(Republic of Ireland) Eugene Hughes	5
(Northern Ireland) Dennis Taylor	3
(England) Gary Wilkinson	5
(England) Jimmy White	5
(Wales) Steve Newbury	2
(England) John Parrott	5
(England) Barry West	1
(Australia) John Campbell	3
(New Zealand) Dene O'Kane	5
(England) Steve James	5
(England) Jim Chambers	2
(Wales) Terry Griffiths	2
(Canada) Kirk Stevens	5
(Wales) Darren Morgan	1
(South Africa) Peter Francisco	5
(England) Ken Owers	5
(England) Tony Knowles	4
(England) Martin Clark	3
(Canada) Alain Robidoux	5
(Scotland) Stephen Hendry	5
(South Africa) Silvino Francisco	4

Last 16; Best of 9 frames
(England) Nigel Bond	5
(England) Willie Thorne	1
(England) Neal Foulds	5
(England) Mike Hallett	2
(England) Ian Graham	2
(Republic of Ireland) Eugene Hughes	5
(England) Gary Wilkinson	0
(England) Jimmy White	5
(England) John Parrott	5
(New Zealand) Dene O'Kane	2
(England) Steve James	5
(Canada) Kirk Stevens	2
(South Africa) Peter Francisco	5
(England) Ken Owers	1
(Canada) Alain Robidoux	3
(Scotland) Stephen Hendry	5

Quarter-finals; Best of 9 frames
(England) Nigel Bond	5
(England) Neal Foulds	2
(Republic of Ireland) Eugene Hughes	2
(England) Jimmy White	5
(England) John Parrott	3
(England) Steve James	5
(South Africa) Peter Francisco	0
(Scotland) Stephen Hendry	5

Semi-finals; Best of 17 frames
(England) Nigel Bond	9
(England) Jimmy White	8
(England) Steve James	5
(Scotland) Stephen Hendry	9

Final; Best of 19 frames
(England) Nigel Bond	5
(Scotland) Stephen Hendry	10

== Final ==
Final: Best of 19 frames. Referee: Len Ganley; Hexagon Theatre, Reading, England, 21 October 1990.
Stephen Hendry; Scotland	10–5	Nigel Bond; England
81–15, 82–0 (82), 64–63, 0–108 (100), 2–80 (65), 0–139 (139), 0–86 (85), 43–78, 72–16, 106–0 (106), 70–40, 77–18, 105–1 (61), 93–31 (93), 63–41
106	Highest break	139
1	Century breaks	2
4	50+ breaks	4

== Century breaks ==
- 140 – Jimmy White
- 139, 100 – Nigel Bond
- 134, 106 – Stephen Hendry
- 133 – John Parrott
- 122, 101 – Dene O'Kane
- 122 – Kirk Stevens
- 122 – Willie Thorne
- 119 – Andrew Cairns
- 117 – Martin Clark
- 114 – Gary Wilkinson
- 111 – Brady Gollan
- 110 – Alain Robidoux
- 107 – Murdo MacLeod
- 104 – Peter Francisco
- 102 – Stephen Murphy
- 101 – Paul Watchorn
