= 1984 Malaysian Masters =

Snooker tournament in Malaysia

Malaysian Masters
Tournament information
- Dates: 23–24 August 1984
- Venue: Royal Selangor Club
- City: Kuala Lumpur
- Country: Malaysia
- Organisation: WPBSA
- Format: Non-ranking event

Final
- Champion: Terry Griffiths (WAL)
- Runner-up: Tony Meo (ENG)
- Score: Round-Robin

The 1984 Camus Malaysian Masters was a professional non-ranking snooker tournament, which took place between 23 and 24 August 1984 at the Royal Selangor Club in Kuala Lumpur, Malaysia.

The event was held as a round robin with each player playing each other once. Professionals Steve Davis, Terry Griffiths and Tony Meo participated along with two local players. Terry Griffiths won the tournament by virtue of finishing top of the round robin league table, winning three and drawing one of his matches.

== Results ==
1984 Malaysian Masters match results
Player	Score	Player
Steve Davis (ENG)	1–1	M. Oy (MAS)
Terry Griffiths (WAL)	2–0	Hoy Eng Lok (MAS)
Tony Meo (ENG)	2–0	Hoy Eng Lok (MAS)
Terry Griffiths (WAL)	2–0	M. Oy (MAS)
Tony Meo (ENG)	2–0	Steve Davis (ENG)
M. Oy (MAS)	2–0	Hoy Eng Lok (MAS)
Terry Griffiths (WAL)	2–0	Tony Meo (ENG)
Steve Davis (ENG)	2–0	Hoy Eng Lok (MAS)
Tony Meo (ENG)	2–0	M. Oy (MAS)
Steve Davis (ENG)	1–1	Terry Griffiths (WAL)
