= Ken Owers =

English snooker player (born 1953)

Personal information
- Born: 30 March 1953 (age 73)

Sport
- Country: England
- Sport: Snooker
- Professional: 1986–1997
- Highest ranking: 52 (1987/1988)
- Best ranking finish: Last 16 (x2)

Ken Owers (born 30 March 1953) is an English former professional snooker player. He played professionally from 1986 to 1997, and won the World Professional Billiards and Snooker Association's Non-ranking Event 2 in 1989.

== Career ==
Ken Owers was born on 30 March 1953. He started playing snooker when he was 11 and applied to the World Professional Billiards and Snooker Association (WPBSA) to be a professional player in 1985, but was rejected. The following year, he won the Working Men's Club and Institute Union Snooker Championship, regarded as the second-most prestigious amateur snooker event in the UK, behind the English Amateur Championship. Owers and his playing partner Steve Meakin reached the final of the 1986 National Pairs Championship but they were defeated by P. Fryat and A. Durham. The same year, Owers finished third in the professional ticket series, which meant he was eligible to turn professional in the 1986–87 snooker season.

His first tournament as a professional was the 1986 International Open. There, he defeated John Hargreaves 5–3, George Scott 5–1, Jimmy White 5–2 and Dene O'Kane 5–0, before losing 1–5 to Neal Foulds in the last-16 round. Later in the same season he reached the last 16 at the 1987 English Professional Championship, exiting 2–6 to Mike Hallett, and twice beat the veteran Fred Davis – 5–3 in the British Open, and 10–5 in the 1987 World Championship, where he eventually lost in the last 64 to Warren King. In the 1987–88 snooker world rankings he was 52nd, and the highest-ranked of the players who had been on the professional circuit for only a year.

The following season, Owers beat Mick Fisher 5–0 and Rex Williams 5–3 before losing 0–5 to Peter Francisco in the last 32 at the 1988 Classic, and again progressed to the last 16 of the English Professional Championship, this time losing 4–6 to Tony Knowles. Owers won the 1989 WPBSA Invitational Event Two beating Dave Gilbert 9–6 in the final.

In the 1989–90 snooker season he reached the last 64 at the 1990 European Open; there, he lost 2–5 to Alex Higgins. At the 1990 World Championship, Owers beat Mike Darrington 10–1, but was eliminated in the last 96, losing 8–10 to John Spencer.

Owers reached the last 16 at a ranking event for the first time in four years at the 1990 Grand Prix. There, he was victorious over Gary Natale, Brian Rowswell, John Virgo and Knowles, before losing once more to Peter Francisco – this time taking the third frame in a 1–5 defeat.

This proved to be Owers' last showing in the latter stages of a tournament; at the 1993 World Championship, he lost his second-round qualifying match 0–10 to Drew Henry, having beaten Sefton Payne 5–1 in the first round. In the 1997 World Championship, Owers lost 5–10 to Leigh Robinson in his first qualifying match; this was his final match on the professional circuit. He was ranked 256th in the world at the end of the 1996–97 snooker season, when only the top 64 players qualified for the main circuit for the following season.

=== Non-ranking wins: (1) ===
- WPBSA Non-ranking Event 2 – 1989
