= 1988 Matchroom League =

Rothmans Matchroom League
Tournament information
- Dates: 23 January – 15 May 1988
- Organisation: Matchroom Sport
- Format: Non-ranking event
- Total prize fund: £220,000
- Winner's share: £70,000
- Highest break: (England) Tony Meo (147)

Final
- Champion: (England) Steve Davis
- Runner-up: (Scotland) Stephen Hendry
- Score: Round-Robin

The 1988 Rothmans Matchroom League was a professional non-ranking snooker tournament that was played from 23 January to 15 May 1988. It featured by now eight players under contract from Barry Hearn's Matchroom stable which Cliff Thorburn had now joined. Non Matchroom players this year were former world snooker champion Joe Johnson and Grand Prix champion Stephen Hendry who celebrated his 19th birthday just before the league started. Matches were played mostly around sports and leisure centres and town halls across the UK and also some overseas countries with Ostend in Belgium for the first weekend before some other matches taking place in Luxembourg, Monaco and Spain and a return to Belgium later on.

Steve Davis topped the table and won the tournament. Tony Meo recorded a maximum break in his match against Stephen Hendry at Chesterfield on 20th February.

== Prize fund ==
The breakdown of prize money for this year is shown below:

- Winner: £70,000
- Runner-up: £30,000
- 3rd place: £25,000
- 4th place: £20,000
- 5th Place: £17,000
- 6th Place: £15,000
- 7th Place: £13,000
- 8th Place: £11,000
- 9th Place: £9,000
- 10th Place: £5,000
- Highest break: £5,000
- Total: £220,000

== League phase ==
Ranking		(England) DAV	(Scotland) HEN	(England) THO	(England) FOU	(England) WHI	(Wales) GRI	(Canada) THO	(England) MEO	(Northern Ireland) TAY	(England) JOH	Frame W-L	Match W-D-L	Pld-Pts
Winner	Steve Davis	x	4	5	5	8	4	5	5	5	4	45–27	6–3–0	9–21
Runner-up	Stephen Hendry	4	x	2	4	4	6	6	6	7	7	46–26	5–3–1	9–18
3	Willie Thorne	3	6	x	3	6	4	6	4	4	5	41–31	4–3–2	9–15
4	Neal Foulds	3	4	5	x	4	4	5	3	6	6	40–32	4–3–2	9–15
5	Jimmy White	0	4	2	4	x	6	2	5	5	6	34–38	4–2–3	9–14
6	Terry Griffiths	4	2	4	4	2	x	4	5	5	5	35–37	3–4–2	9–13
7	Cliff Thorburn	3	2	2	3	6	4	x	4	6	7	37–35	3–2–4	9–11
8	Tony Meo	3	2	4	5	3	3	4	x	4	6	34–38	2–3–4	9–9
9	Dennis Taylor	3	1	4	2	3	3	2	4	x	8	30–42	1–2–6	9–5
10	Joe Johnson	4	1	3	2	2	3	1	2	0	x	18–54	0–1–8	9–1

If points were level then match wins, followed by most frames won determined their positions. If two players had an identical record then the result in their match determined their positions. If that ended 4–4 then the player who got to four first was higher.

- 23 January – Thermae Palace Hotel, Ostend
  - Cliff Thorburn 6–2 Dennis Taylor
- 24 January – Thermae Palace Hotel, Ostend
  - Steve Davis 4–4 Stephen Hendry
- 24 January – St David's Hall, Cardiff
  - Tony Meo 5–3 Neal Foulds
  - Jimmy White 6–2 Terry Griffiths
- 13 February – Ritz Billiard Club, Helsinki
  - Willie Thorne 5–3 Joe Johnson
- 13 February – Antrim Forum, Antrim
  - Terry Griffiths 4–4 Cliff Thorburn
  - Steve Davis 5–3 Neal Foulds
- 14 February – The George and Dragon Pub, Luxembourg
  - Jimmy White 5–3 Tony Meo
- 14 February – Newry Leisure Centre, Newry
  - Neal Foulds 5–3 Cliff Thorburn
  - Terry Griffiths 5–3 Dennis Taylor
- 19 February – Aston Villa Sports and Leisure Centre, Birmingham
  - Jimmy White 5–3 Dennis Taylor
- 20 February – The Winding Wheel, Chesterfield
  - Stephen Hendry 6–2 Tony Meo
  - Dennis Taylor 4–4 Willie Thorne
- 20 February – Beach Plaza Hotel. Monte Carlo
  - Neal Foulds 4–4 Terry Griffiths
- 21 February – Gateshead Lesuire Centre, Gateshead
  - Willie Thorne 6–2 Stephen Hendry
  - Jimmy White 6–2 Joe Johnson
- 21 February – Beach Plaza Hotel, Monte Carlo
  - Steve Davis 5–3 Cliff Thorburn
- 20 March – Central Hall, York
  - Steve Davis 5–3 Tony Meo
- 20 March – Woodford Leisure Centre, Kingston-upon-Hull
  - Neal Foulds 5–3 Willie Thorne
  - Dennis Taylor 8–0 Joe Johnson
- 2 April – New Victoria Theatre, Stoke-on-Trent
  - Tony Meo 4–4 Willie Thorne
  - Steve Davis 5–3 Dennis Taylor
- 3 April – The Hotel Andalucia Plaza Casino, Marbella
  - Neal Foulds 6–2 Joe Johnson
- 4 April – The Hotel Andalucia Plaza Casino, Marbella
  - Stephen Hendry 7–1 Dennis Taylor
- 4 April – Corn Exchange, Cambridge
  - Willie Thorne 6–2 Cliff Thorburn
  - Terry Griffiths 5–3 Joe Johnson
- 9 April – Cleethorpes Leisure Centre, Cleethorpes
  - Tony Meo 4–4 Dennis Taylor
  - Steve Davis 4–4 Terry Griffiths
- 9 April – Northgate Arena Leisure Centre, Chester
  - Neal Foulds 4–4 Stephen Hendry
  - Cliff Thorburn 6–2 Jimmy White
- 10 April – Thornaby Pavilion Leisure Centre, Thornaby-on-Tees
  - Tony Meo 4–4 Cliff Thorburn
  - Stephen Hendry 7–1 Joe Johnson
- 10 April – Victoria Community Centre, Crewe
  - Willie Thorne 4–4 Terry Griffiths
  - Jimmy White 4–4 Neal Foulds
- 7 May – Perdiswell Sports Centre, Worcester
  - Tony Meo 6–2 Joe Johnson
  - Jimmy White 4–4 Stephen Hendry
- 7 May – Granby Halls Leisure Centre, Leicester
  - Steve Davis 5–3 Willie Thorne
- 8 May – Royal Concert Hall, Nottingham
  - Steve Davis 8–0 Jimmy White
- 8 May – Swansea Leisure Centre, Swansea
  - Cliff Thorburn 7–1 Joe Johnson
  - Stephen Hendry 6–2 Terry Griffiths
- 13 May – Brighton Centre, Brighton
  - Steve Davis 4–4 Joe Johnson
- 14 May – Crest Hotel, Antwerp
  - Terry Griffiths 5–3 Tony Meo
- 14 May – The Court Centre, Peterborough
  - Stephen Hendry 6–2 Cliff Thorburn
- 15 May – Fairfield Halls, Croydon
  - Neal Foulds 6–2 Dennis Taylor
  - Willie Thorne 6–2 Jimmy White
