= 1983 Pontins Brean Sands =

Tournament information
- Dates: 21–27 May 1983
- Venue: Sands Holiday Village
- City: Burnham-on-Sea
- Country: England
- Organisation: WPBSA
- Format: Non-ranking event

Final
- Champion: (England) Tony Meo
- Runner-up: (South Africa) Silvino Francisco
- Score: 9–7

The 1983 Pontins Brean Sands Championship was a professional invitational snooker tournament which took place in May 1983 in Burnham-on-Sea, England.

The tournament featured six professional players. Beginning with a single group stage, four players advanced to the semi-finals. The group matches and semi-finals were contested over the best of 9 frames, and the final over the best of 17 frames. Unlike other tournaments, all 9 frames in the group stage were played even when a match had already been won.

Tony Meo won the event, beating Silvino Francisco 9–7 in the final.

== Group stage ==
- (South Africa) Silvino Francisco 5–4 Jimmy White (England)
- (England) Tony Meo 5–4 Silvino Francisco (South Africa)
- (England) Tony Meo 6–3 Jimmy White (England)
- (England) John Spencer 6–3 Cliff Wilson (Wales)
- (England) John Virgo 7–2 Cliff Wilson (Wales)
- (England) John Virgo 8–1 John Spencer (England)

== Knockout stage ==
Semi-finals; Best of 9 frames
(England) Tony Meo	5
(England) John Spencer	4
(South Africa) Silvino Francisco	5
(England) John Virgo	0

Final; Best of 17 frames
(England) Tony Meo	9
(South Africa) Silvino Francisco	7
