= World Doubles Championship =

Tournament information
- Venue: Derngate Centre
- Location: London (1982) / Northampton (1983–1987)
- Country: England
- Established: 1982
- Organisation(s): World Professional Billiards and Snooker Association
- Format: Non-ranking team event
- Final year: 1987
- Final champion: (England) Mike Hallett (Scotland) Stephen Hendry

The World Doubles Championship, also known as the Hofmeister World Doubles (1982–1986) or the Fosters World Doubles (1987) for sponsorship purposes, was a non-ranking team snooker tournament held from 1982 to 1987 as the major doubles event.

== History ==
Created to capitalise on the growing popularity of televised snooker, as well as to offer a slightly different version of the game, the event was initially staged at the Crystal Palace in London, sponsored by Courage Brewery through their Hofmeister brand. 29 pairs entered the event, which was played from the last 16 in London.

Due to poor attendance of the inaugural event it was moved to the Derngate in Northampton. In 1987 the sponsorship of the event was moved to the Fosters brand, but the sponsorship contract expired the same year. By the end of the 1980s, other more significant events were making up the snooker calendar and the tournament was eventually abandoned. Four of the six tournaments were won by the pairing of Steve Davis and Tony Meo.

== Winners ==
Year	Winners	Runners-up	Final score	Season
1982	(England) Steve Davis & (England) Tony Meo	(Wales) Terry Griffiths & (Wales) Doug Mountjoy	13–2	1982/83
1983	(England) Steve Davis & (England) Tony Meo	(England) Tony Knowles & (England) Jimmy White	10–2	1983/84
1984	(Northern Ireland) Alex Higgins & (England) Jimmy White	(Canada) Cliff Thorburn & (England) Willie Thorne	10–2	1984/85
1985	(England) Steve Davis & (England) Tony Meo	(England) Tony Jones & (Wales) Ray Reardon	12–5	1985/86
1986	(England) Steve Davis & (England) Tony Meo	(England) Mike Hallett & (Scotland) Stephen Hendry	12–3	1986/87
1987	(England) Mike Hallett & (Scotland) Stephen Hendry	(Canada) Cliff Thorburn & (Northern Ireland) Dennis Taylor	12–8	1987/88
