= 1985 Australian Masters =

Australian Masters
Tournament information
- Dates: August 1985
- Venue: Parmatta Club
- City: Sydney
- Country: Australia
- Organisation: WPBSA
- Format: Non-ranking event
- Winner's share: £10,000

Final
- Champion: (England) Tony Meo
- Runner-up: (Australia) John Campbell
- Score: 7–2

The 1985 Winfield Australian Masters was a professional non-ranking snooker tournament that took place in August 1985 at the Parmatta Club in Sydney, Australia.

Tony Meo won the tournament by defeating John Campbell 7–2 in the final.

== Main draw ==
Round 1 Best of 7 Frames
(England) Tony Meo	4
(Australia) Warren King	1
(England) John Virgo	4
(England) Tony Knowles	1
(England) Jimmy White	4
(England) David Taylor	0
(England) Joe Johnson	4
(Canada) Bill Werbeniuk	1
(Australia) John Campbell	4
(Northern Ireland) Alex Higgins	1
(Australia) Eddie Charlton	4
(Australia) Ian Anderson	2
(England) John Parrott	4
(South Africa) Silvino Francisco	3
(England) Willie Thorne	4
(Australia) Paddy Morgan	2

Quarter-finals; Best of 9 Frames
(England) Tony Meo	5
(England) John Virgo	3
(England) Jimmy White	5
(England) Joe Johnson	4
(Australia) John Campbell	5
(Australia) Eddie Charlton	4
(England) John Parrott	5
(England) Willie Thorne	0

Semi-finals; Best of 11 Frames
(England) Tony Meo	6
(England) Jimmy White	3
(Australia) John Campbell	6
(England) John Parrott	4

Final; Best of 13 Frames
(England) Tony Meo	7
(Australia) John Campbell	2
