= 1978 Canadian Open =

Canadian Open
Tournament information
- Dates: 16 August – 4 September 1978
- Venue: Canadian National Exhibition Stadium
- City: Toronto
- Country: Canada
- Organisation: WPBSA
- Format: Non-ranking event
- Total prize fund: $15,000
- Winner's share: $6,000
- Highest break: Tony Meo (ENG) (131)

Final
- Champion: (Canada) Cliff Thorburn
- Runner-up: (England) Tony Meo
- Score: 17–15

The 1978 Canadian Open was the fifth edition of the professional invitational snooker tournament, the Canadian Open, which took place between 16 August and 4 September 1978.

Cliff Thorburn won the title defeating Tony Meo 17–15 in the final.

== Main draw ==
Round 1 Best of 17 frames
(England) Tony Knowles	9
(United States) Steve Mizerak	7
(England) Tony Meo	9
(Canada) Frank Jonik	8
(England) Steve Davis	9
(Canada) Kari Elovaara	0

Round 2 Best of 17 frames
(Canada) Cliff Thorburn	9
(Canada) Leo Levitt	1
(Canada) Paul Thornley	9
(England) John Pulman	6
(Canada) Kevin Robitaille	9
(Canada) Tom Regina	2
(England) Tony Knowles	9
(England) Rex Williams	2
(England) Tony Meo	9
(Canada) Bill Werbeniuk	3
(Canada) Kirk Stevens	9
?	?	?
(Northern Ireland) Alex Higgins	9
(Canada) Mario Morra	5
(England) Steve Davis	9
(England) Willie Thorne	3

Quarter-finals; Best of 17 frames
(Canada) Cliff Thorburn	9
(Canada) Paul Thornley	7
(Canada) Kevin Robitaille	9
(England) Tony Knowles	5
(England) Tony Meo	9
(Canada) Kirk Stevens	3
(Northern Ireland) Alex Higgins	9
(England) Steve Davis	8

Semi-finals; Best of 17 frames
(Canada) Cliff Thorburn	9
(Canada) Kevin Robitaille	5
(England) Tony Meo	9
(Northern Ireland) Alex Higgins	7

Final; Best of 33 frames
(Canada) Cliff Thorburn	17
(England) Tony Meo	15
