= Malaysian Masters (snooker) =

Tournament information
- Country: Malaysia
- Established: 1984
- Organisation(s): Matchroom Sport; WPBSA
- Format: Non-ranking event
- Final year: 1996
- Final champion: (Wales) Dominic Dale

The Malaysian Masters was a non-ranking snooker tournament staged on three occasions in 1984, 1986 and 1996.

The first tournament was played as a round-robin in 1984, with Terry Griffiths winning the tournament by topping the group. The tournament was not played the following season, but returned in a knockout format in 1986, with Jimmy White winning by defeating Dennis Taylor 2–1 in the final. A third tournament was held in 1996 for lower-ranked players; Dominic Dale won the first professional tournament of his career by defeating Drew Henry 8–3 in the final.

== Winners ==
Year	Winner	Runner-up	Final score	Season
1984	(Wales) Terry Griffiths	(England) Tony Meo	Round-Robin	1984/85
1986	(England) Jimmy White	(Northern Ireland) Dennis Taylor	2–1	1986/87
1996	(Wales) Dominic Dale	(Scotland) Drew Henry	8–3	1995/96
