= 1990 International League =

Matchroom International League
Tournament information
- Dates: 16 January–17 June 1990
- Country: Europe
- Organisation: Matchroom Sport
- Format: Non-ranking event

Final
- Champion: (England) Tony Meo
- Runner-up: (England) Jimmy White
- Score: Round-Robin

The 1990 Matchroom International League was a professional non-ranking snooker tournament that was played from January to May 1990.

Tony Meo topped the table and won the tournament.

== League phase ==
Ranking		(England) MEO	(England) WHI	(Wales) GRI	(England) DAV	(England) HAL	(Northern Ireland) HIG	Frame W-L	Match W-D-L	Pld-Pts
Winner	Tony Meo	x	5	4	5	8	5	27–13	4–1–0	5–13
Runner-up	Jimmy White	3	x	4	5	6	5	23–17	3–1–1	5–10
3	Terry Griffiths	4	4	x	4	6	7	25–15	2–3–0	5–9
4	Steve Davis	3	3	4	x	6	4	20–20	1–2–2	5–5
5	Mike Hallett	0	2	2	2	x	6	12–28	1–0–4	5–3
6	Alex Higgins	3	3	1	4	2	x	13–27	0–1–4	5–1

If points were level then match wins, followed by most frames won determined their positions. If two players had an identical record then the result in their match determined their positions. If that ended 4–4 then the player who got to four first was higher.

- 17 January – Paris
  - Jimmy White 5–3 Steve Davis
- 25 January – Frankfurt
  - Tony Meo 5–3 Steve Davis
- 1 February – Reykjavík
  - Alex Higgins 4–4 Steve Davis
- 17 February – Turku
  - Tony Meo 5–3 Alex Higgins
- 18 March – Zwolle
  - Terry Griffiths 7–1 Alex Higgins

Unknown dates

- Switel Hotel, Antwerp
  - Jimmy White 5–3 Alex Higgins
  - Steve Davis 4–4 Terry Griffiths
- Marriott Hotel, Munich
  - Jimmy White 6–2 Mike Hallett
- Cafe Winker, Salzburg
  - Jimmy White 4–4 Terry Griffiths
- Algarve
  - Steve Davis 6–2 Mike Hallett
- Vigo
  - Terry Griffiths 6–2 Mike Hallett
- Mijas
  - Tony Meo 5–3 Jimmy White
  - Tony Meo 4–4 Terry Griffiths
  - Tony Meo 8–0 Mike Hallett
  - Mike Hallett 6–2 Alex Higgins
