= 1984 Classic (snooker) =

Tournament information
- Dates: 8–15 January 1984
- Venue: Spectrum Arena
- City: Warrington
- Country: England
- Organisation: WPBSA
- Format: Ranking event
- Total prize fund: £82,000
- Winner's share: £18,000
- Highest break: Rex Williams (ENG) (143)

Final
- Champion: Steve Davis (ENG)
- Runner-up: Tony Meo (ENG)
- Score: 9–8

The 1984 Lada Classic was the fifth edition of the professional snooker tournament, which took place from 8–15 January 1984. The tournament was played at the Spectrum Arena, Warrington, Cheshire. This was the first year in which the tournament was held as a ranking event. Television coverage was on ITV.

Rex Williams made a total clearance of 143 in the seventh frame of his match against Tony Meo, but lost the match 3–5. Williams won the high break prize of £1,000.

Steve Davis won his third Classic title beating fellow Londoner Tony Meo by 9–8. Meo led 4–2 before Davis won the last frame of the afternoon session with a break of 122 and then four more frames in a row in the evening to lead 7–4. Meo then won the next four frames to lead 8–7 before Davis levelled the match at 8–8 with a break of 84. With only the colours left in the deciding frame and Meo lined up on the yellow, a spectator yelled out "Come on, Tony!". Although Meo took time to compose himself after the shout, he missed the yellow and a few shots later Davis the frame after potting the final pink.

== Main draw ==
Last 16; Best of 9 frames
1	Steve Davis (ENG)	5
16	John Spencer (ENG)	1
Colin Roscoe (WAL)	2
9	Terry Griffiths (WAL)	5
4	Tony Knowles (ENG)	5
Mike Hallett (ENG)	3
5	Alex Higgins (NIR)	2
John Parrott (ENG)	5
Rex Williams (ENG)	3
15	Tony Meo (ENG)	5
7	Kirk Stevens (CAN)	5
Murdo MacLeod (SCO)	1
6	Eddie Charlton (AUS)	5
11	Jimmy White (ENG)	2
Silvino Francisco (RSA)	1
Mark Wildman (ENG)	5

Quarter-finals; Best of 9 frames
1	(England) Steve Davis	5
9	(Wales) Terry Griffiths	4
4	(England) Tony Knowles	2
(England) John Parrott	5
15	(England) Tony Meo	5
7	(Canada) Kirk Stevens	1
6	(Australia) Eddie Charlton	4
(England) Mark Wildman	5

Semi-finals; Best of 9 frames
1	(England) Steve Davis	5
(England) John Parrott	4
15	(England) Tony Meo	5
(England) Mark Wildman	3

Final; Best of 17 frames
1	(England) Steve Davis	9
15	(England) Tony Meo	8

== Final ==
Final: Best of 17 frames. Referee: Jim Thorpe. Spectrum Arena, Warrington, England, 15 January 1984.
Steve Davis; England	9–8	Tony Meo; England
Afternoon: 119–0, 51–41, 19–83, 33–84, 7–60, 44–87, 130–0 (122); Evening: 108–1 76–5, 112–9, 63–2, 47–85, 33–69, 16–67, 57–64, 101–0, 60–42
122	Highest break	52
1	Century breaks	0

== Qualifying ==
The final qualifying round was played in Warrington in November 1983.

=== Final qualifying round ===
Steve Davis (ENG)	5–2	Eddie Sinclair (SCO)
John Spencer (ENG)	5–4	Joe Johnson (ENG)
Bill Werbeniuk (CAN)	4–5	Colin Roscoe (WAL)
Terry Griffiths (WAL)	5–2	Dean Reynolds (ENG)
Tony Knowles (ENG)	5–1	Eugene Hughes (IRL)
Dennis Taylor (NIR)	4–5	Mike Hallett (ENG)
Alex Higgins (NIR)	5–3	Patsy Fagan (IRL)
Doug Mountjoy (WAL)	4–5	John Parrott (ENG)

Ray Reardon (WAL)	4–5	Rex Williams (ENG)
Tony Meo (ENG)	5–1	Jim Meadowcroft (ENG)
Kirk Stevens (CAN)	5–4	Eddie McLaughlin (SCO)
David Taylor (ENG)	4–5	Murdo MacLeod (SCO)
Eddie Charlton (AUS)	5–0	Cliff Wilson (WAL)
Jimmy White (ENG)	5–1	John Campbell (AUS)
Cliff Thorburn (CAN)	1–5	Silvino Francisco (RSA)
John Virgo (ENG)	2–5	Mark Wildman (NIR)

== Century breaks ==
(Including qualifying rounds)

- 143, 105 – Rex Williams
- 125 – Mario Morra
- 122 – Steve Davis
- 111 – Silvino Francisco
- 104 – Jimmy White
- 102 – John Parrott
- 102 – Ray Reardon
