= John Hargreaves (snooker player) =

English snooker player (1945–2024)

Personal information
- Born: December 2, 1945
- Died: 27 March 2024 (aged 78) Stoke-on-Trent

Sport
- Country: England
- Sport: Snooker
- Professional: 1983–1988
- Highest ranking: 92 (1986/1987)

John Hargreaves (2 December 1945 – 27 March 2024) was an English professional snooker player.

== Snooker career ==
As an amateur, he won the 1981 Pontins Spring Open, beating Cliff Wilson 7–2 in the final.

Hargreaves turned professional in 1983. He was beaten in his first matches in the qualifying rounds of the 1983 Professional Players Tournament (0–5 by Mario Morra), the 1983 UK Championship (4–9 by Ian Williamson and the 1984 World Snooker Championship (5–10 to Eddie McLaughlin. He did however record wins over Warren King (5–3) and Billy Kelly (5–4) in the qualifying rounds of the 1984 Classic before losing 1–5 to Mark Wildman in the third qualifying round. Having failed to gain any ranking points, we was unranked in the snooker world rankings 1984/1985.

Following the 1984–85 snooker season, during which he did not progress beyond the qualifying rounds of any tournament, Hargreaves was the lowest ranked of 102 players in the Snooker world rankings 1985/1986. Despite again failing to get past the qualifying rounds during the 1985–86 snooker season, Hargreaves improved his ranking to 92nd, a career high.

He again failed to reach the final stages of any tournament in the 1986–87 snooker season, and in the 1987–88 snooker season played only one match, losing 4–5 to Morra in the first qualifying round of the 1987 International Open. It was to be his last professional tournament appearance.

During the 2023-24 season, having not played competitively for thirty-six years, Hargreaves entered two amateur events; in the first, at the Cueball in Derby in January 2024, he lost 0–3 to Daniel Bagley and in the second, at the Landywood Snooker Club in Walsall in late February, he took the first frame against Luke Newman but lost the match 1–3.

On 27 March 2024, a month after his final competitive match, Hargreaves died at the age of 78 in Stoke-on-Trent.

== Career finals ==
=== Pro-am finals: 1 (1 title) ===
Outcome	No.	Year	Championship	Opponent in the final	Score
Winner	1.	1981	Pontins Spring Open	(Wales) Cliff Wilson	7–2
