= 1983 International Open =

1983 Jameson International Open
Tournament information
- Dates: 1–9 October 1983
- Venue: Eldon Square Recreation Centre
- City: Newcastle-upon-Tyne
- Country: England
- Organisation: WPBSA
- Format: Ranking event
- Total prize fund: £85,000
- Winner's share: £24,000
- Highest break: Steve Davis (ENG) (120)

Final
- Champion: Steve Davis (ENG)
- Runner-up: Cliff Thorburn (CAN)
- Score: 9–4

The 1983 International Open (officially the 1983 Jameson International Open) was a professional ranking snooker tournament that took place between 1 and 9 October 1983 at the Eldon Square Recreation Centre in Newcastle-upon-Tyne, England. Steve Davis won the tournament, beating Cliff Thorburn 9–4 in the final. Television coverage was on ITV.

== Summary ==
The defending champion Tony Knowles was defeated by John Spencer in the last 16 round.

Cliff Thorburn beat Terry Griffiths 9–8 in the first semi-final after winning the last four frames. At one stage Griffiths had led 5–1. Steve Davis beat Eddie Charlton 9–2 in the second semi-final.

Steve Davis met Cliff Thorburn in the final. Davis led 6–2 after the afternoon session and eventually won 9–4. He took the first prize of £24,000 for his win and another £1,500 for the high break prize, for a break of 120 against Mike Watterson at the last-16 stage.

== Main draw ==
Last 16; Best of 9 frames
1	Tony Knowles (ENG)	4
16	John Spencer (ENG)	5
George Scott (ENG)	0
9	Terry Griffiths (WAL)	5
Dave Martin (ENG)	0
12	Doug Mountjoy (WAL)	5
4	Cliff Thorburn (CAN)	5
13	Dennis Taylor (NIR)	3
3	Ray Reardon (WAL)	0
Willie Thorne (ENG)	5
6	Eddie Charlton (AUS)	5
Mario Morra (CAN)	3
Silvino Francisco (RSA)	5
Jim Donnelly (SCO)	1
2	Steve Davis (ENG)	5
Mike Watterson (ENG)	0

Quarter-finals; Best of 9 frames
16	(England) John Spencer	4
9	(Wales) Terry Griffiths	5
12	(Wales) Doug Mountjoy	2
4	(Canada) Cliff Thorburn	5
(England) Willie Thorne	0
6	(Australia) Eddie Charlton	5
(South Africa) Silvino Francisco	1
2	(England) Steve Davis	5

Semi-finals; Best of 17 frames
9	(Wales) Terry Griffiths	8
4	(Canada) Cliff Thorburn	9
(Australia) Eddie Charlton	2
2	(England) Steve Davis	9

Final; Best of 17 frames
4	(Canada) Cliff Thorburn	4
2	(England) Steve Davis	9

== Qualifying ==
The final qualifying round was played at the Romiley Forum in Stockport in September.

=== Final qualifying round ===
Tony Knowles (ENG)	5–1	Ray Edmonds (ENG)
John Spencer (ENG)	5–1	Paddy Morgan (AUS)
Bill Werbeniuk (CAN)	3–5	George Scott (ENG)
Terry Griffiths (WAL)	5–2	Graham Miles (ENG)
Alex Higgins (NIR)	2–5	Dave Martin (ENG)
Doug Mountjoy (WAL)	5–4	Mark Wildman (ENG)
Cliff Thorburn (CAN)	5–0	Eddie Sinclair (SCO)
Dennis Taylor (NIR)	5–3	Dean Reynolds (ENG)

Ray Reardon (WAL)	5–2	Murdo MacLeod (SCO)
John Virgo (ENG)	2–5	Willie Thorne (ENG)
Eddie Charlton (AUS)	5–2	Joe Johnson (ENG)
Jimmy White (ENG)	5–3	Mario Morra (CAN)
Kirk Stevens (CAN)	w/d–w/o	Silvino Francisco (RSA)
David Taylor (ENG)	3–5	Jim Donnelly (SCO)
Steve Davis (ENG)	5–1	Eugene Hughes (IRL)
Tony Meo (ENG)	3–5	Mike Watterson (ENG)
