= Eddie McLaughlin (snooker player) =

Scottish snooker player

Sport
- Country: Scotland
- Sport: Snooker
- Highest ranking: 54
- Best ranking finish: Last 32, 1984 Classic

Eddie McLaughlin (born 27 June 1952) is a Scottish former professional snooker player. He turned professional in 1981 and reached a highest ranking of 54th.

== Biography ==
McLauglin was runner-up to W. McKerron in the Scottish Open Championship, but defeated McKerron in 1980 to win the title. He was runner-up in the Scottish Amateur Snooker Championship in 1977 and 1978, losing to R. Miller and Jim Donnelly respectively. At the 1980 World Amateur Snooker Championship, McLauglin won three of his six matches in the qualifying group, including 4–2 defeats both of the tournament's eventual runner-up Ron Atkins and of Joe O'Boye, the reigning English Amateur Champion. He did not qualify for the next stage.

He was accepted as a professional player by the World Professional Billiards and Snooker Association in April 1981. There had only been one active Scottish professional, Eddie Sinclair, but the admission of McLaughlin, Bert Demarco, Matt Gibson, Ian Black, Jim Donnelly, and Murdo McLeod that month meant that there were now seven. McLaughlin retained a job as an Estates Manager for British Telecom while playing professionally.

In the 1980–81 snooker season he played in the Scottish Professional Championship and defeated Chris Ross 5-3 in the quarter-finals before losing 3–6 to Ian Black in the semi-finals. In next season he beat Black, Mark Wildman and David Greaves at the 1981 International Open before losing to Tony Meo, but lost his opening matches at the UK Championship, World Championship qualifying, and Scottish professional championship.

He defeated Geoff Foulds and Willie Thorne in the 1984 Classic qualifying before losing 4–5 to Kirk Stevens. He also won two matches at the 1984 Classic, against Dessie Sheehan and Fred Davis, but again lost a deciding frame, this time to MacLeod. In the 1984–85 snooker world rankings he was placed 54th, a career high. He started the season with a 5–3 win against Stephen Hendry in the qualifying competition for the 1985 Matchroom Trophy, bet was beaten by Tony Knowles in the next round and did not win any of his other five matches that season.

He broke his back in a car accident in July 1986, and was unable to play for nearly two full professional seasons. His first professional match after the accident was against Demarco in the qualifying round of the 1988 Scottish Professional Championship, which he lost 0–6. He then lost 1–10 to Colin Roscoe in his first match at the 1988 World Championship qualifying competition.

In the season, McLaughlin lost four matches and withdrew from another. In 1989, McLaughlin was in a Glasgow pub when he was struck on the head during a brawl that he was not a participant in. He experienced headaches following this, and an x-ray showed a blood clot. He had surgery, but complications emerged and after three further operations he lapsed into a coma. By 1991 he showed no signs of brain activity and was assessed as having no prospect of recovery. As of 1994 he was still comatose. A 1994 article in The Sunday Times called him "An immense talent [who] was tragically removed from the game".
