= Tony Meo =

English snooker player

Personal information
- Nicknames: The Cat (Meo, Meo)
- Born: 4 October 1959 (age 67) Tooting, London

Sport
- Country: England
- Sport: Snooker
- Professional: 1979–1997
- Highest ranking: 10 (1984–1986)
- Maximum breaks: 1

Tournament wins
- Ranking: 1

Anthony Christian Meo (born 4 October 1959) is a retired English snooker player. He won the 1989 British Open by defeating Dean Reynolds 13–6 in the final, and was runner-up to Steve Davis at the 1984 Classic. He won four World Doubles Championship titles, partnering Davis, and the 1983 World Team Classic representing England alongside Davis and Tony Knowles.

He played snooker together with his schoolfriend Jimmy White as a teenager. Aged seventeen, Meo became the then-youngest person known to have made an unofficial maximum break of 147. He won the British under-19 title in 1978, as well as other junior titles. He turned professional in 1979, and won the 1981 Australian Masters, 1983 Thailand Masters and 1985 Australian Masters. He reached the final of the 1984 Lada Classic but lost in the deciding frame. He took the 1986 English Professional Championship title, and retained it in 1987. He made a break of 147 in his 1988 Matchroom League match against Stephen Hendry, and won the 1990 International League.

He retired from professional play after the 1996–97 snooker season and became a wrist watch consultant. In 1986, Meo was one of five players under Barry Hearn's management (along with Davis, Terry Griffiths, Willie Thorne and Dennis Taylor) who appeared on "Snooker Loopy", a hit single about the game recorded with Chas & Dave.

== Early life ==
Anthony Christian Meo was born on 4 October 1959 in Tooting, London, and started playing snooker aged 13. He was a schoolfriend of Jimmy White at Ernest Bevin Comprehensive, and the pair regularly skipped school to play snooker together. When he was 15 (and White was 13), they were approached by "Dodgy" Bob Davis who arranged money matches for them and became their manager. The players later signed to be managed, alongside the leading London amateur Patsy Fagan, by Henry West. At 17, Meo became the then-youngest person known to have made an unofficial maximum break of 147.

== Amateur career ==
Meo defeated White in the final to win the 1977 Pontins Junior title as well as taking the Warners Pro-Am title by winning against professional Doug Mountjoy 5–4 in the final. Meo took the British under-19 title in 1978 with a 3–1 victory against defending champion Ian Williamson in the final. At the 1978 Canadian Open, he achieved the most notable win of his career to that point by eliminating Alex Higgins in the semi-final, and led 10–6 in the final against Cliff Thorburn before losing the match 15–17. He won a second Warners Open title in 1979, 5–2 against White in the final.

== Professional career ==
Meo turned professional in June 1979. At the 1979 Canadian Open he was seeded into the last 16, where he lost 7–9 to Jim Wych. He eliminated David Taylor from the 1979 UK Championship 9–7, and then lost to the eventual champion John Virgo 6–9 in the following round. He made his world championship debut at the 1980 World Snooker Championship, after progressing past Jimmy van Rensberg and Pat Houlihan (both 9–1) in qualifying. Facing Higgins, Meo was ahead after their first session, and at 9–8 was a frame away from winning before Higgins took the last two frames with breaks of 77 and 62 to claim victory.

At the 1980 UK Championship, Meo eliminated defending champion Virgo 9–1 before losing to Steve Davis in the quarter-finals. The 1981 English Professional Championship saw Meo eliminate Virgo, Graham Miles and Willie Thorne to reach the final. Meo finished as runner-up, losing 3–9 to Davis. Meo recorded his third win against Virgo in the season with a 10–6 win at the 1981 World Snooker Championship, making a break of 134 during the match. In the second round, Meo finished his first session with Terry Griffiths at 4–4, but only won two of the next eleven frames, with Griffiths taking the match 13–6.

At the start of the 1981–82 snooker season, Meo won the 1981 Australian Masters, a short-format competition that saw two groups each of four professional players play one-frame round-robin matches, with the group winners then playing the final over three frames. He lost 3–9 to Griffiths in the semi-finals at the 1981 UK Championship after eliminating both Higgins and Thorburn. Davis and Meo won the 1982 World Doubles Championship. Meo also reached the semi-finals of the 1982 Masters. The 1982 UK Championship was a repeat of 1981 in that he reached the semi-finals and lost to Griffiths, this time 7–9. He reached the World Championship quarter-finals for the first time at the 1983 tournament, and finished the season by winning the 1983 Pontins Brean Sands tournament, with a 9–7 final victory against Silvino Francisco.

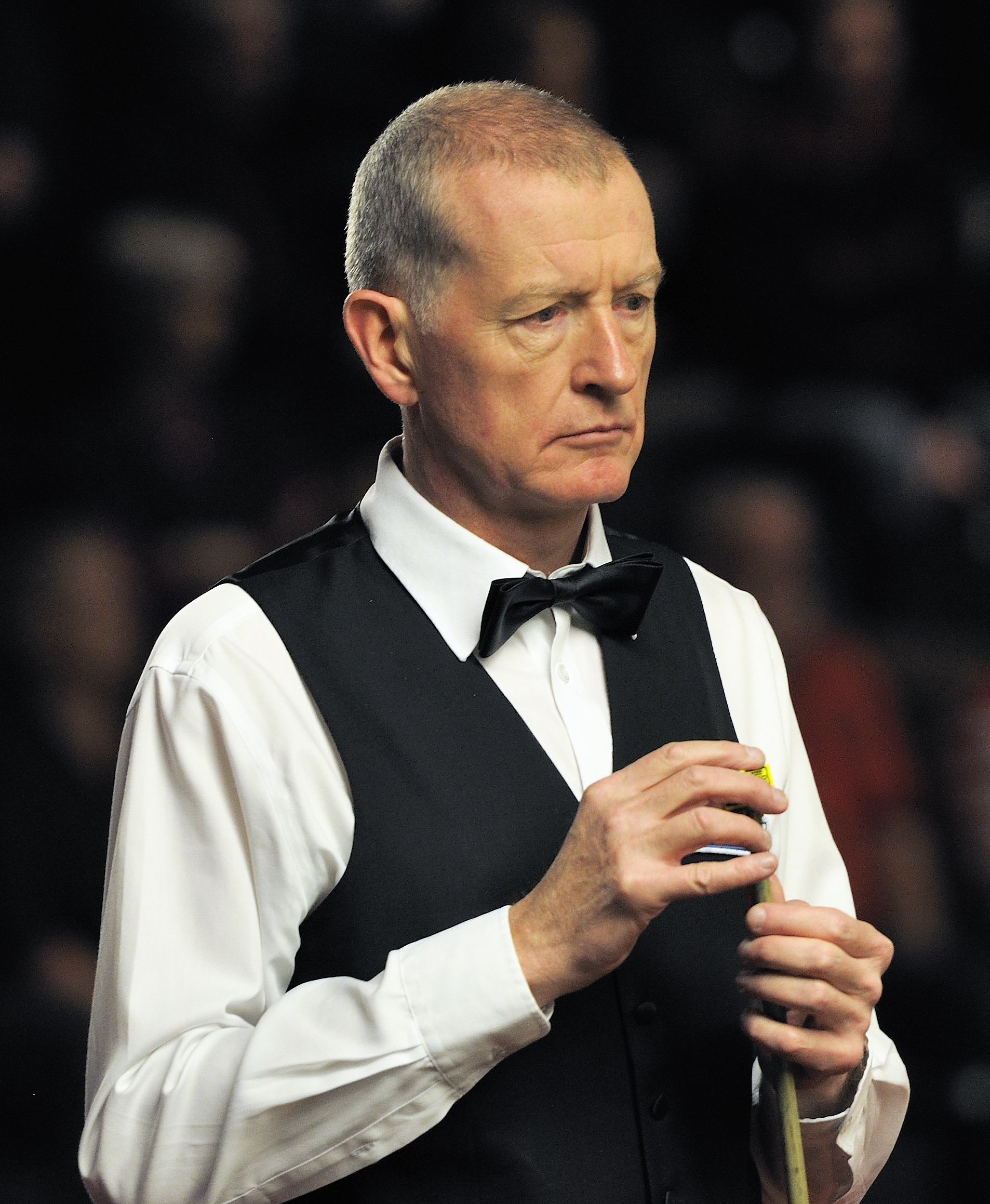
Steve Davis (pictured in 2014) and Meo won four World Doubles Championships together.

In the 1983–84 snooker season, he won the 1983 Thailand Masters, and was a semi-finalist at the 1983 Professional Players Tournament. In December 1983, Davis and Meo retained the World Doubles Championship. The following month, they faced each other in the final of the Lada Classic. Meo had reached the final by eliminating Rex Williams 5–3, Kirk Stevens 5–2 and Mark Wildman 5–3. After losing the first two frames in the final, Meo established a 4–2 lead, which was reduced to 4–3 after Davis won the concluding frame of the first session with a 122 clearance. In the second session, Davis took the first four frames, compiling six breaks of 35 or more. Meo claimed the next four frames, to require just one more frame at 8–7, having recovered from more than 40 points behind in both the 12th and 15th frames. Davis won the 16th frame with a break of 84 to force a deciding frame. Davis built a lead of 38 points, but Meo recovered to 12 points behind with a break of 26. Meo only needed to clear the colours to win the title, but missed potting the yellow ball after being distracted by a shout of "Come on, Tony" from a spectator. Davis went on to win the frame and match.

The non-ranking 1984 Malaysian Masters was the only final that Meo reached in 1984–85 snooker season, but he retained his ranking of tenth for 1985–86. He won the 1985 Australian Masters by defeating John Campbell 7–2 in the final, and the 1986 English Professional Championship. In the latter, he defeated Davis 9–7 in the semi-finals, his first victory over Davis in their eleven professional matches against each other. In the final, Meo led Neal Foulds 3–1, but the first session finished with the pair level at 3–3. Meo was a frame ahead at 4–3 and 5–4, with Foulds then taking the next two frames to lead for the first time in the match at 6–5. Meo added the 12th frame, but Foulds moved ahead again by claiming the 13th. Meo won the next three frames for a 9–7 victory, finishing with a break of 94 in the 16th frame.

The 1987 English Professional Championship saw him retain the title by defeating Les Dodd 9–5 in the final, but his ranking tournament performances in the 1986–87 snooker season meant he slipped from 11th to 20th place in the rankings, and his results in the following season saw him fall to 31st in the 1988/1989 rankings. He compiled a maximum break of 147 in his 1988 Matchroom League match against Stephen Hendry.

In the 1988–89 snooker season, he reached the quarter-finals of the 1988 International Open. At the 1989 British Open he eliminated Colin Roscoe 5–3, then the defending champion Hendry and Peter Francisco, each by the same scoreline. In the semi-final against Mike Hallett, Meo was two frames behind with three to play at 6–8. He won the 15th frame by a single point after requiring two snookers, then added the next two frames to win 9–8. In the final, he played Dean Reynolds, and won each of the first two sessions 5–2, thus leading 10–4 by the third session. Reynolds reduced his deficit to 6–10, but Meo won the next three frames to claim victory at 13–6 and achieve his first ranking title victory. Before the tournament, he had been rated as a 200–1 outsider to win. In the post-match speeches, Reynolds complained that he had been "totally bored" by Meo's cautious style of play. Meo acknowledged that "It wasn't very spectacular" and added that he felt that it was "the best tactical snooker" that he had ever played.

Meo was a semi-finalist at the World Championship, losing 7–16 to John Parrott. His performances in ranking tournaments led to him moving up from 31st place to 14th in the rankings for the following season, during which he won the round-robin 1990 International League by winning four of his five matches, and drawing the other one. However, in the following years, he failed to reach as far as the quarter-finals in any ranking tournament, and his ranking fell one place to 15th, then out of the top 32. Meo was ranked 160th after the 1996–97 snooker season, but did not participate in any further tournaments in the following seasons. He became a wrist watch consultant.

In 1982, Meo signed up to be managed by Barry Hearn, Davis's manager. With Davis, Meo won four World Doubles titles, and was also part of the victorious England team at the 1983 World Team Classic. In 1986, Meo was one of five players under Hearn's management (along with Davis, Griffiths, Thorne and Dennis Taylor) who appeared on "Snooker Loopy", a hit single about the game recorded with Chas & Dave. He was nicknamed "The Cat" and "Meo, Meo". The highest ranking that he attained was tenth.

== Personal life ==
By 1981, Meo had married Denise, and in 1991 they had their fifth child. After retiring from snooker in 1997, Meo managed a wristwatch and jewellery store in Hatton Garden.

== Performance and rankings timeline ==
| Tournament | 1978/ 79 | 1979/ 80 | 1980/ 81 | 1981/ 82 | 1982/ 83 | 1983/ 84 | 1984/ 85 | 1985/ 86 | 1986/ 87 | 1987/ 88 | 1988/ 89 | 1989/ 90 | 1990/ 91 | 1991/ 92 | 1992/ 93 | 1993/ 94 | 1994/ 95 | 1995/ 96 | 1996/ 97 | Ref. |
|---|---|---|---|---|---|---|---|---|---|---|---|---|---|---|---|---|---|---|---|---|
| Ranking | (Note: He was an amateur.) | | (Note: New players on the Main Tour do not have a ranking.) | 18 | 24 | 15 | 10 | 10 | 11 | 20 | 31 | 14 | 15 | 34 | 38 | 51 | 69 | 75 | 75 | |
Ranking tournaments
| Asian Classic (Note: The event was also called the Dubai Masters (1988/1989), Dubai Classic (1989/90–1994/1995) and Thailand Classic (1995/1996)) | Tournament Not Held | | | | | | | | | | NR | A | 1R | 1R | LQ | LQ | LQ | LQ | LQ | |
| Grand Prix (Note: The event was also called the Professional Players Tournament (1982/83–1983/1984)) | Tournament Not Held | | | | 3R | SF | 1R | 3R | QF | 1R | 2R | 2R | 1R | 1R | LQ | 1R | LQ | LQ | LQ | |
| UK Championship | Non-Ranking Event | | | | | | 2R | 3R | 2R | 2R | 1R | 1R | 1R | LQ | LQ | LQ | LQ | 1R | LQ | |
| German Open | Tournament Not Held | | | | | | | | | | | | | | | | | LQ | WD | |
| Welsh Open | Tournament Not Held | | | | | | | | | | | | | 2R | LQ | LQ | LQ | LQ | LQ | |
| International Open (Note: The event was also called the Goya Matchroom Trophy (1985/1986)) | Not Held | | | NR | LQ | 1R | 2R | 2R | 1R | 2R | QF | 1R | Not Held | | 1R | LQ | LQ | LQ | LQ | |
| European Open | Tournament Not Held | | | | | | | | | | 1R | 1R | 2R | LQ | 1R | LQ | LQ | LQ | WD | |
| Thailand Open (Note: The event was also called the Thailand Masters (1983/1984–1986/1987 & 1991/1992) and the Asian Open (1989/1990–1992/1993)) | Tournament Not Held | | | | | Non-Ranking Event | | | | Not Held | | 2R | 1R | 2R | 1R | LQ | LQ | LQ | WD | |
| British Open (Note: The event was also called the British Gold Cup (1979/1980), Yamaha Organs Trophy (1980/1981) and International Masters (1981/1982–1983/1984)) | NH | Non-Ranking Event | | | | | QF | QF | 1R | 1R | W | 2R | 3R | LQ | 1R | 1R | LQ | LQ | WD | |
| World Championship | A | 1R | 2R | 1R | QF | 1R | 2R | 1R | 1R | LQ | SF | 2R | 2R | LQ | LQ | LQ | LQ | LQ | LQ | |
Non-ranking tournaments
| Scottish Masters | Not Held | | | A | A | QF | A | A | A | A | NH | A | A | A | A | A | A | A | A | |
| The Masters | A | A | A | SF | 1R | 1R | QF | 1R | SF | A | A | 1R | QF | WD | LQ | LQ | A | A | A | |
| Irish Masters | A | A | A | QF | QF | QF | 1R | QF | QF | A | A | A | A | A | A | A | A | A | A | |
| Pontins Professional | A | A | A | A | A | A | A | A | QF | SF | A | A | A | A | A | A | A | A | A | |
| European League (Note: The event was also called the Professional Snooker League (1983/1984) and the Matchroom League (1986/1987–1991/1992)) | Tournament Not Held | | | | | A | Not Held | | RR | RR | RR | RR | RR | RR | A | A | A | A | A | |
Former ranking tournaments
| Canadian Masters (Note: The event was also called the Canadian Open (1978/1979–1980/1981)) | Non-Ranking | | | Tournament Not Held | | | | Non-Ranking | | | LQ | Tournament Not Held | | | | | | | | |
| Hong Kong Open (Note: The event was also called the Australian Masters (1979/1980–1987/1988) and Australian Open (1994/1995)) | NH | Ranking Event | | | | | | | | | NH | 2R | Tournament Not Held | | | | Ranking | | NH | |
| Classic | NH | Non-Ranking Event | | | | F | 1R | 3R | 3R | 2R | 2R | 2R | 1R | LQ | Tournament Not Held | | | | | |
| Strachan Open | Tournament Not Held | | | | | | | | | | | | | 3R | MR | NR | Not Held | | | |
Former non-ranking tournaments
| Canadian Masters (Note: The event was also called the Canadian Open (1978/1979–1980/1981)) | F | 2R | QF | Tournament Not Held | | | | A | A | A | R | Tournament Not Held | | | | | | | | |
| International Open (Note: The event was also called the Goya Matchroom Trophy (1985/1986)) | Not Held | | | 1R | Ranking Event | | | | | | | | Not Held | | Ranking Event | | | | | |
| Pontins Brean Sands | Tournament Not Held | | | | W | Tournament Not Held | | | | | | | | | | | | | | |
| UK Championship | A | 2R | QF | SF | SF | QF | Ranking Event | | | | | | | | | | | | | |
| British Open (Note: The event was also called the British Gold Cup (1979/1980), Yamaha Organs Trophy (1980/1981) and International Masters (1981/1982–1983/1984)) | NH | SF | LQ | RR | RR | LQ | Ranking Event | | | | | | | | | | | | | |
| Tolly Cobbold Classic | A | A | A | QF | A | QF | Tournament Not Held | | | | | | | | | | | | | |
| New Zealand Masters | Tournament Not Held | | | | | | 1R | Not Held | | | A | A | Tournament Not Held | | | | | | | |
| Thailand Open (Note: The event was also called the Thailand Masters (1983/1984–1986/1987 & 1991/1992) and the Asian Open (1989/1990–1992/1993)) | Tournament Not Held | | | | | W | RR | RR | A | Not Held | | Ranking Event | | | | | | | | |
| Singapore Masters | Tournament Not Held | | | | | | RR (Note: Tournament was a 5 player round-robin. Meo did not finish in the top two places.) | RR | Tournament Not Held | | | | | | | | | | | |
| Pot Black | A | A | A | A | A | 1R | A | 1R | Tournament Not Held | | | | | A | A | A | Not Held | | | |
| Australian Masters (Note: The event was also called the Hong Kong Open (1989/1990) and Australian Open (1994/1995)) | NH | A | A | W | SF | QF | SF | W | QF | A | NH | R | Tournament Not Held | | | | A | A | NH | |
| Malaysian Masters | Tournament Not Held | | | | | | F | NH | QF | Tournament Not Held | | | | | | | | | A | |
| Kent Cup | Tournament Not Held | | | | | | | | QF | A | A | A | A | NH | A | Tournament Not Held | | | | |
| Tokyo Masters | Tournament Not Held | | | | | | | | | QF | Tournament Not Held | | | | | | | | | |
| Hong Kong Masters | Tournament Not Held | | | | | SF | SF | SF | QF | A | QF | NH | A | A | Tournament Not Held | | | | | |
| Dubai Masters (Note: The event was also called the Dubai Classic (1989/90–1994/1995), Thailand Classic (1995/1996), and Asian Classic (1996/1997)) | Tournament Not Held | | | | | | | | | | SF | Ranking Event | | | | | | | | |
| Matchroom Professional Championship | Tournament Not Held | | | | | | | | 1R | 1R | QF | Tournament Not Held | | | | | | | | |
| Norwich Union Grand Prix | Tournament Not Held | | | | | | | | | | RR | A | A | Tournament Not Held | | | | | | |
| English Professional Championship | Not Held | | F | Not Held | | | SF | W | W | QF | 1R | Tournament Not Held | | | | | | | | |
| World Matchplay | Tournament Not Held | | | | | | | | | | A | 1R | A | A | A | Tournament Not Held | | | | |
| International League | Tournament Not Held | | | | | | | | | | | W | Tournament Not Held | | | | | | | |
| London Masters | Tournament Not Held | | | | | | | | | | A | SF | A | Tournament Not Held | | | | | | |
| Shoot-Out | Tournament Not Held | | | | | | | | | | | | 1R | Tournament Not Held | | | | | | |
| World Masters | Tournament Not Held | | | | | | | | | | | | 3R | Tournament Not Held | | | | | | |

Performance and rankings timeline notes

Performance Table Legend
| LQ | lost in the qualifying draw | #R | lost in the early rounds of the tournament (WR = Wildcard round, RR = Round robin) | QF | lost in the quarter-finals |
| SF | lost in the semi-finals | F | lost in the final | W | won the tournament |
| DNQ | did not qualify for the tournament | A | did not participate in the tournament | WD | withdrew from the tournament |

| NH / Not Held | means an event was not held. |
| NR / Non-Ranking Event | means an event is/was no longer a ranking event. |
| R / Ranking Event | means an event is/was a ranking event. |

== Career finals ==
=== Ranking finals: 2 (1 title) ===
| Outcome | No. | Year | Championship | Opponent in the final | Score | Ref. |
|---|---|---|---|---|---|---|
| Runner-up | 1. | 1984 | The Classic | Steve Davis (ENG) | 8–9 | |
| Winner | 1. | 1989 | British Open | Dean Reynolds (ENG) | 13–6 | |

=== Non-ranking finals: 11 (8 titles) ===
| Outcome | No. | Year | Championship | Opponent in the final | Score | Ref. |
|---|---|---|---|---|---|---|
| Runner-up | 1. | 1978 | Canadian Open | Cliff Thorburn (CAN) | 15–17 | |
| Runner-up | 2. | 1981 | English Professional Championship | Steve Davis (ENG) | 3–9 | |
| Winner | 1. | 1981 | Australian Masters | John Spencer (ENG) | Aggregate Score | |
| Winner | 2. | 1983 | Pontins Brean Sands | Silvino Francisco (RSA) | 9–7 | |
| Winner | 3. | 1983 | Thailand Masters | Steve Davis (ENG) | 2–1 | |
| Winner | 4. | 1983 | Bangkok Golden Cue Tournament | Terry Griffiths (WAL) | 2–1 | |
| Runner-up | 3. | 1984 | Malaysian Masters | Terry Griffiths (WAL) | Round-Robin | |
| Winner | 5. | 1985 | Australian Masters (2) | John Campbell (AUS) | 7–2 | |
| Winner | 6. | 1986 | English Professional Championship | Neal Foulds (ENG) | 9–7 | |
| Winner | 7. | 1987 | English Professional Championship (2) | Les Dodd (ENG) | 9–5 | |
| Winner | 8. | 1990 | Matchroom International League | Jimmy White (ENG) | Round-Robin | |

=== Team finals: 6 (5 titles) ===
| Outcome | No. | Year | Championship | Team/partner | Opponent(s) in the final | Score | Ref. |
|---|---|---|---|---|---|---|---|
| Winner | 1. | 1982 | World Doubles Championship | Steve Davis (ENG) | Terry Griffiths (WAL); Doug Mountjoy (WAL) | 13–2 | |
| Winner | 2. | 1983 | World Team Classic | England | Wales | 4–2 | |
| Winner | 3. | 1983 | World Doubles Championship (2) | Steve Davis (ENG) | Tony Knowles (ENG); Jimmy White (ENG) | 10–2 | |
| Runner-up | 1. | 1985 | World Cup | England A | (Republic of Ireland) All-Ireland | 7–9 | |
| Winner | 4. | 1985 | World Doubles Championship (3) | Steve Davis (ENG) | Tony Jones (ENG); Ray Reardon (WAL) | 12–5 | |
| Winner | 5. | 1986 | World Doubles Championship (4) | Steve Davis (ENG) | Mike Hallett (ENG); Stephen Hendry (SCO) | 12–3 | |

=== Pro-am finals: 3 (2 titles) ===
| Outcome | No. | Year | Championship | Opponent in the final | Score | Ref. |
|---|---|---|---|---|---|---|
| Winner | 1. | 1977 | Warners Open | Doug Mountjoy (WAL) | 5–4 | |
| Runner-up | 1. | 1978 | Pontins Spring Open | Steve Davis (ENG) | 6–7 | |
| Winner | 2. | 1979 | Warners Open (2) | Jimmy White (ENG) | 5–2 | |

=== Amateur finals: 2 (2 titles) ===
| Outcome | No. | Year | Championship | Opponent in the final | Score | Ref. |
|---|---|---|---|---|---|---|
| Winner | 1. | 1977 | Pontins Junior Championship | Jimmy White (ENG) | 3–2 | |
| Winner | 2. | 1978 | British Under-19 Championship | Ian Williamson (ENG) | 3–1 | |

== Bibliography ==
- Everton, Clive (1985). Snooker: The Records. Enfield: Guinness Superlatives. ISBN 0-85112448-8.
- Everton, Clive; Hale, Janice; Dee, John (April 1989). "How the favourites lost, how the outsider won". Snooker Scene. Everton's News Agency. pp. 19–23.
- Hayton, Eric; Dee, John (2004). The CueSport Book of Professional Snooker: The Complete Record & History. Lowestoft: Rose Villa Publications. ISBN 978-0-95485490-4.
- Morrison, Ian (1987). The Hamlyn Encyclopedia of Snooker - revised edition. Twickenham: Hamlyn Publishing Group. ISBN 0-60055604-2.
- Morrison, Ian (1988). Hamlyn Who's Who in Snooker. London: Hamlyn. ISBN 0-60055713-8.
- Smith, Terry, ed. (1989). Benson and Hedges Snooker Year (6th ed.). Aylesbury: Pelham Books. ISBN 0-72071944-5.
