= George Scott (snooker player) =

English snooker player

Personal information
- Born: 16 September 1928
- Died: 14 September 1998 (aged 69)

Sport
- Country: England
- Sport: Snooker
- Professional: 1981–1995
- Highest ranking: 37 (1984–1985)
- Best ranking finish: Last 16 (x1)

George Scott (16 September 1928 – 14 September 1998) was an English professional snooker player.

== Snooker career ==
Scott worked in his family's ice cream business. After an amateur snooker career that included winning the Merseyside snooker title 13 times in a span from the 1950s to the 1970s, Scott turned professional in 1981. He played in the 1982 Bass and Golden Leisure Classic, where he was defeated 1–3 by the eventual champion Rex Williams in the last 16.

Scott reached the last 32 of the 1982 International Open, losing 1–5 to Cliff Thorburn, and the last 16 of the 1983 edition of the event, where he defeated Pat Houlihan 5–0, Matt Gibson 5–3 and Bill Werbeniuk also 5–3 before himself being whitewashed 0–5 by Terry Griffiths.

In the 1984–85 snooker season, his best performance was a run to the last 32 of the Classic, where he lost 1–5 to eventual runner-up Thorburn. Several last-32 finishes came during the 1985–86 snooker season; Scott lost 1–5 to Willie Thorne in the 1985 Matchroom Trophy; 3–5 to Cliff Wilson in the Grand Prix; and 1–9 to Tony Meo in the English Professional Championship, having earlier beaten Bernard Bennett by the same scoreline.

Scott next featured in the latter stages of a ranking tournament at the 1988 Canadian Masters, defeating Clive Everton, Ray Edmonds and Williams before losing 1–5 to Steve Davis. Scott last played professionally 1993. In 1997 he had a lung removed due to cancer; he died of lung cancer the following year.

== Personal life ==
Scott died in September 1998, shortly before his 70th birthday.
