= Jack Fitzmaurice =

English snooker player (1928–2005)

Personal information
- Born: 25 April 1928 Solihull, England
- Died: January 2005 (aged 76) Birmingham, England

Sport
- Country: England
- Sport: Snooker
- Professional: 1981–2001
- Highest ranking: 32 (1982–1983)
- Best ranking finish: Last 32 (x2)

Jack Fitzmaurice (25 April 1928 – January 2005) was an English professional snooker player.

== Career ==
Born in Solihull, Fitzmaurice was runner-up in the English Amateur Championship in 1958, defeated 8–11 by Marcus Owen in the final.

He turned professional in 1981 at the age of 53. He reached the last 32 of the 1982 World Snooker Championship, defeating Mario Morra 9–7 before losing his match against Kirk Stevens 4–10. At the time of Fitzmaurice's death, the 548 minutes match duration of his defeat of Morra was still the longest best-of-seventeen frames match on record.

Fitzmaurice never again progressed beyond the last 32 of a ranking tournament, recording his final victory at the 1997 European Open, 5–4 over Ian Glover. Without a ranking after the 1998–99 season, he played his final match in 2001 at the World Championship, losing 0–5 to Carl Stringer, and subsequently left the tour, concluding his professional career aged 73.

== Personal life ==
Fitzmaurice died in Birmingham in January 2005, aged 76.
