= Ian Black (snooker player) =

Scottish snooker player (1954–2006)

Ian Black (11 December 1954 – 25 October 2006) was a professional snooker player from Scotland.

Black had 11 seasons on the world snooker tour from 1981 to 1992, and achieved a best ranking of 47th.

He won the 1981 Scottish Professional Championship defeating Matt Gibson 11–7 in the final. In 1982 he reached the final again, losing 11–7 to Eddie Sinclair.

== Death ==
Black died 25 October 2006 aged 51.
