= Paul Medati =

English snooker and pool player

Personal information
- Born: 14 November 1943 Salford, England
- Died: 29 November 2008 (aged 65) Salford, England

Sport
- Country: England
- Sport: Snooker
- Professional: 1981–1995
- Highest ranking: 58 (1986–87)
- Best ranking finish: Last 32 (x4)

Paul Medati (14 November 1943 – 29 November 2008) was an English professional snooker and pool player.

== Career ==
Medati was born in Ordsall, Salford, Lancashire to Maltese parents, and attended St. Joseph's Primary School.

After playing snooker for many years, he turned professional in 1981, and perhaps the best performance of his career came when he reached the last 16 of the 1983 UK Championship, where he was defeated 9-1 by eventual winner Alex Higgins. In 1986, Higgins appeared at the 1986 Classic with a black eye, courtesy of a disagreement with Medati.

He had other notable victories in his career defeating the likes of John Parrott, John Spencer and Dean Reynolds. In his later years he became a pool player, and the Paul Medati Trophy is a pool tournament named in his honour. Medati died of cancer at home in Salford in 2008.
