= 1985–86 snooker world rankings =

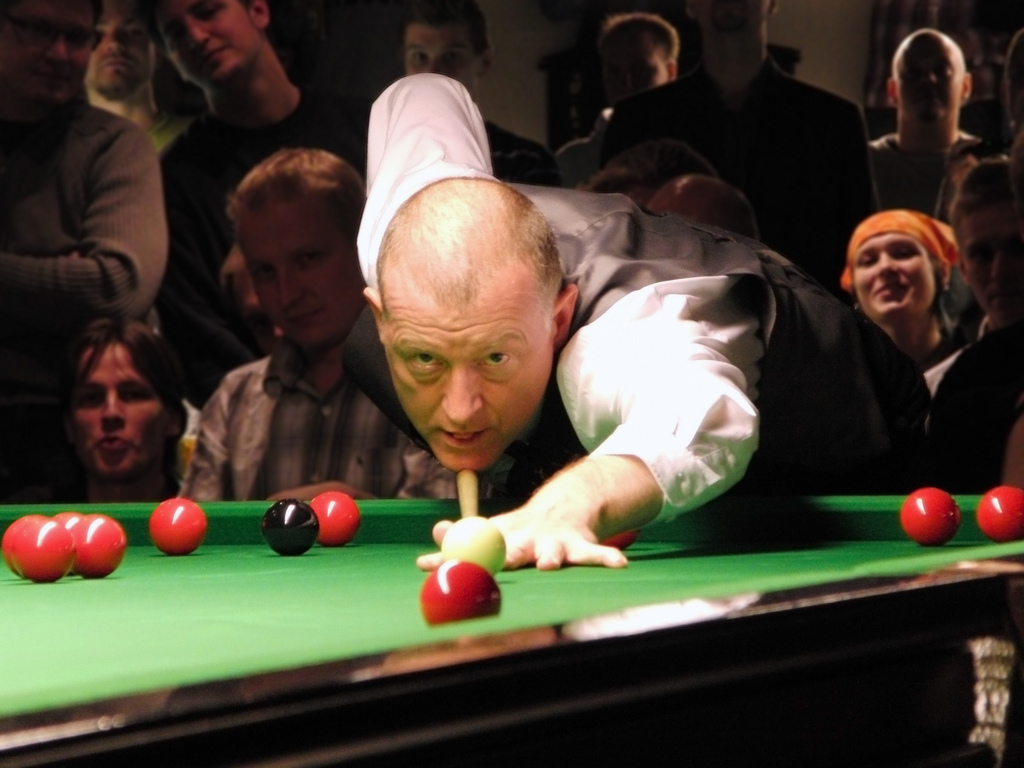
Steve Davis (pictured in 2008) retained his place at the top of the rankings.

The World Professional Billiards and Snooker Association (WPBSA), the governing body for professional snooker, first introduced a ranking system for professional players in 1976, with the aim of seeding players for the World Snooker Championship. The reigning champion would be automatically seeded first, the losing finalist from the previous year seeded second, and the other seedings based on the ranking list. Initially, the rankings were based on performances in the preceding three world championships.

After the 1982 World Snooker Championship, two other tournaments which were open to all members of the WPBSA – the International Open and the Professional Players Tournament – carried ranking points. Points for world championship finishes from 1983 became worth double the previous tariff, with ten points for the winner, eight for the runner up, and so on. In the 1983/1984 snooker season, the Lada Classic was added as a ranking tournament. The UK Championship and Dulux British Open were added to the ranking list from the 1984/1985 season, which meant that performances in those events were taken into account for the 1985/1986 rankings. In the same season, due to changes in sponsors, the Professional Players Tournament became the Rothmans Grand Prix, and the Lada Classic became the Mercantile Credit Classic. The tournaments that counted towards the 1985/1986 rankings were those which were open to all professional players over the preceding three seasons.

Merit points were awarded to players who were required to compete in qualifying rounds of ranking tournaments and reached the last 32, with a full merit point awarded if this was achieved in the world championship, and half a merit point otherwise. No points were awarded to a player who did not win any matches in a given tournament (for example, a top 16 player seeded into the last 32 of the world championship would not win any merit points if they lost their first match).

The journalist Janice Hale commented in March 1985 that as the ranking list was updated only annually, players such as John Spencer who had won only one match in the year since the 1984 World Championship, and Bill Werbeniuk, who had not won any, were at an advantage over other players who had performed better in that time, as the top 16 received direct entry to the last-32 round of the 1985 World Snooker Championship, meaning that their minimum guaranteed prize money was higher.

Steve Davis retained the number one position that he had held in the previous two ranking lists, while Cliff Thorburn moved up from second to third, exchanging places with Tony Knowles. The 1985 World champion Dennis Taylor moved up from 11th to fourth. Of the top 16 players from the previous year, the largest drops were by Eddie Charlton, from sixth to 12th, and by Spencer, who went from 13th to 20th.

== Points tariff ==
In addition to standard ranking points, a "merit" point was awarded for losers in the last 32 of the World Championship, and a half merit point awarded to losers in the last 32 of other ranking tournaments. No points were awarded to a player who did not win any matches in a given tournament (for example, a top 16 player seeded into the last 32 of the world championship would not win any merit points if they lost their first match). Merit points were only used to determine placings between players that had an equal opportunity to earn them; players in the top 16 could not earn merit points from tournaments where they were exempted into the last-32 round. Players ranked from 77 to 102 had no ranking or merit points, with their positions determined by their performances in the 1985 World Snooker Championship, with frames won being taken into consideration if the round reached was equal.

Points tariff contributing to the Snooker world rankings 1985/1986
Placing	World Championships	Other Ranking Tournaments
Champion	10	5
Runner-up	8	4
Losing semi-finalist	6	3
Losing Quarter-finalist	4	2
Last 16 Loser	2	1
Last 32 Loser	1 merit point	0.5 merit point

== Rankings ==
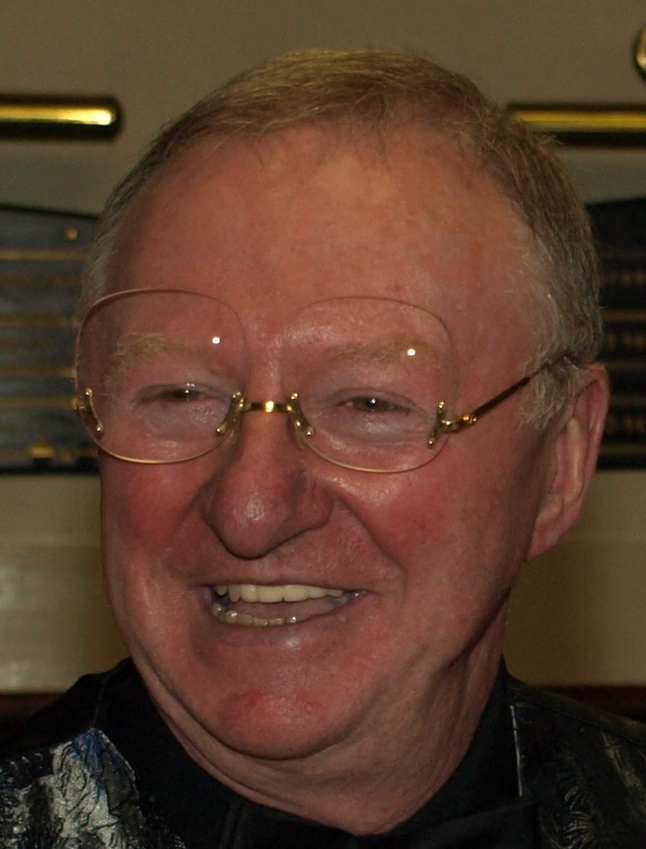
Dennis Taylor (pictured in 2008) rose seven places in the rankings, to fourth, after winning the 1985 World Snooker Championship

The rankings for the 1985/1986 season are shown in the tables below.

Snooker world rankings 1985/1986 for players with ranking points or merit points
Ranking	Name	1982–83 season			1983–84 season				1984–85 season						Total	Merit points
Ranking	Name	IO	PPT	WC	IO	PPT	Cl	WC	IO	GP	UK	Cl	BO	WC	Total	Merit points
1	Steve Davis (ENG)	2	–	10	5	(0.5)	5	10	5	3+(0.5)	5	3	3+(0.5)	8	59	(1.5)
2	Cliff Thorburn (CAN)	1	1+(0.5)	8	4	2+(0.5)	0	4	0	4+(0.5)	3	4	1+(0.5)	4	36	(2)
3	Tony Knowles (ENG)	5	(0.5)	6	1	5+(0.5)	2	0	4	2+(0.5)	2	0	1+(0.5)	6	34	(2)
4	Dennis Taylor (NIR)	2	1+(0.5)	2	1	0	0	6	2	5+(0.5)	1	0	2+(0.5)	10	32	(1.5)
5	Kirk Stevens (CAN)	3	(0.5)	4	–	2+(0.5)	2	6	0	2+(0.5)	3	1	4+(0.5)	2	29	(2)
6	Ray Reardon (WAL)	1	5+(0.5)	2	1	1+(0.5)	0	4	1	1+(0.5)	2	2	(0.5)	6	26	(2)
7	Jimmy White (ENG)	1	4+(0.5)	0	0	(0.5)	1	8	2	(0.5)	2	1	(0.5)	4	23	(2)
8	Terry Griffiths (WAL)	2	2+(0.5)	2	3	1+(0.5)	2	4	1	0	0	2	(0.5)	4	23	(1.5)
9	Alex Higgins (NIR)	1	(0.5)	6	0	0	1	0	2	(0.5)	4	1	3+(0.5)	2	20	(1.5)
10	Tony Meo (ENG)	0	1+(0.5)	4+(1)	0	3+(0.5)	4	0	1	1+(0.5)	1	0	2+(0.5)	2	19	(3)
11	Willie Thorne (ENG)	0	(0.5)	2	2+(0.5)	3+(0.5)	0	2+(1)	2	1+(0.5)	2	5	(0.5)	0	19	(3.5)
12	Eddie Charlton (AUS)	0	3+(0.5)	4	3	1+(0.5)	2	2	0	1+(0.5)	1	0	0	2	19	(1.5)
13	Silvino Francisco (RSA)	–	–	(1)	2+(0.5)	1+(0.5)	1+(0.5)	2+(1)	3+(0.5)	1+(0.5)	(0.5)	(0.5)	5+(0.5)	(1)	15 (Note: The WPBSA decided at their meeting on 10 June 1985 to deduct two ranking points from Francisco for misconduct at the 1985 British Open, leaving him with 13. The penalty was revoked in December 1985.)	(7)
14	David Taylor (ENG)	4	(0.5)	2	0	(0.5)	0	2	1	1+(0.5)	1	0	0	2	13	(1.5)
15	Doug Mountjoy (WAL)	0	0	2	2	0	0	4	0	2+(0.5)	1	0	0	2	13	(0.5)
16	Joe Johnson (ENG)	0	2+(0.5)	0	(0.5)	4+(0.5)	(0.5)	(1)	1+(0.5)	(0.5)	1+(0.5)	3+(0.5)	0	(1)	11	(6)
17	Bill Werbeniuk (CAN)	1	2+(0.5)	4	0	(0.5)	0	2	0	0	0	0	0	2	11	(1)
18	John Parrott (ENG)	–	–	–	–	(0.5)	3+(0.5)	2+(1)	0	(0.5)	(0.5)	0	(0.5)	4+(1)	9	(4.5)
19	John Virgo (ENG)	3+(0.5)	3+(0.5)	(1)	0	(0.5)	0	0	1+(0.5)	(0.5)	0	2+(0.5)	(0.5)	(1)	9	(5.5)
20	John Spencer (ENG)	1	1+(0.5)	2	2	(0.5)	1	2	0	0	0	0	(0.5)	0	9	(1.5)
21	Eugene Hughes (IRL)	(0.5)	0	(1)	(0.5)	2+(0.5)	(0.5)	0	3+(0.5)	0	(0.5)	1+(0.5)	2+(0.5)	(1)	8	(6)
22	Cliff Wilson (WAL)	2+(0.5)	1+(0.5)	(1)	0	1+(0.5)	(0.5)	0	0	(0.5)	1+(0.5)	1+(0.5)	0	0	6	(4.5)
23	Neal Foulds (ENG)	–	–	–	–	0	0	2+(1)	(0.5)	3+(0.5)	0	0	(0.5)	(1)	5	(3.5)
24	Dean Reynolds (ENG)	1+(0.5)	2+(0.5)	(1)	(0.5)	(0.5)	(0.5)	0	(0.5)	2+(0.5)	0	0	(0.5)	(1)	5	(6)
25	Mark Wildman (ENG)	(0.5)	1+(0.5)	(1)	(0.5)	1+(0.5)	3+(0.5)	0	0	(0.5)	0	0	(0.5)	0	5	(4.5)
26	Murdo MacLeod (SCO)	0	1+(0.5)	0	(0.5)	0	1+(0.5)	0	(0.5)	(0.5)	(0.5)	1+(0.5)	1+(0.5)	(1)	4	(5)
27	Rex Williams (ENG)	(0.5)	(0.5)	(1)	0	(0.5)	1+(0.5)	(1)	(0.5)	(0.5)	1+(0.5)	1+(0.5)	0	(1)	3	(7)
28	Mike Hallett (ENG)	0	(0.5)	(1)	0	1+(0.5)	1+(0.5)	(1)	0	1+(0.5)	(0.5)	(0.5)	(0.5)	(1)	3	(6.5)
29	Dave Martin (ENG)	0	(0.5)	(1)	1+(0.5)	1+(0.5)	0	0	0	(0.5)	0	0	1+(0.5)	0	3	(3.5)
30	Perrie Mans (RSA)	1	(0.5)	2	0	–	–	0	0	0	0	–	–	–	3	(0.5)
31	John Campbell (AUS)	–	–	(1)	0	2+(0.5)	(0.5)	0	(0.5)	(0.5)	(0.5)	0	0	(1)	2	(4.5)
32	Dene O'Kane (NZL)	–	–	–	–	–	–	–	(0.5)	0	0	0	2+(0.5)	(1)	2	(2)
33	Patsy Fagan (IRL)	0	0	0	0	0	(0.5)	0	0	–	0	(0.5)	0	2+(1)	2	(2)
34	Steve Newbury (WAL)	–	–	–	–	–	–	–	1+(0.5)	0	0	0	1+(0.5)	0	2	(1)
35	Warren King (AUS)	–	–	0	0	0	0	(1)	0	0	(0.5)	2+(0.5)	0	0	2	(2)
36	Graham Miles (ENG)	0	0	(1)	(0.5)	(0.5)	0	(1)	0	(0.5)	0	0	1+(0.5)	0	1	(4)
37	Steve Longworth (ENG)	–	–	–	–	–	–	–	0	0	0	1+(0.5)	(0.5)	0	1	(1)
38	Eddie Sinclair (SCO)	(0.5)	1+(0.5)	0	(0.5)	0	(0.5)	(1)	(0.5)	0	0	0	0	0	1	(3.5)
39	Marcel Gauvreau (CAN)	–	–	–	–	0	0	(1)	1+(0.5)	0	(0.5)	(0.5)	0	0	1	(2.5)
40	Malcolm Bradley (ENG)	–	–	–	–	–	–	–	0	0	0	0	1+(0.5)	0	1	(0.5)
41	George Scott (ENG)	(0.5)	–	–	1+(0.5)	(0.5)	0	0	0	0	0	(0.5)	0	0	1	(2)
42	Mike Watterson (ENG)	(0.5)	(0.5)	0	1+(0.5)	(0.5)	0	0	0	0	0	0	0	0	1	(2)
43	Mario Morra (CAN)	0	0	0	1+(0.5)	0	0	(1)	0	0	0	0	0	0	1	(1.5)
44	Bob Chaperon (CAN)	–	–	–	–	–	–	–	0	0	0	0	1+(0.5)	0	1	(0.5)
45	Colin Roscoe (WAL)	(0.5)	0	0	0	0	1+(0.5)	0	0	0	0	0	0	0	1	(1)
46	Jim Donnelly (SCO)	0	0	0	1+(0.5)	0	0	0	0	0	0	0	0	0	1	(0.5)
47	Ian Williamson (ENG)	0	–	0	0	0	0	0	0	1+(0.5)	0	0	0	0	1	(0.5)
48	Jim Meadowcroft (ENG)	(0.5)	(0.5)	(1)	–	(0.5)	(0.5)	0	0	0	0	0	0	0	0	(3)
49	Wayne Jones (WAL)	–	–	–	–	–	–	–	(0.5)	0	0	0	(0.5)	(1)	0	(2)
50	Tony Jones (ENG)	–	–	–	–	0	0	0	0	(0.5)	(0.5)	0	0	(1)	0	(2)
51	Ray Edmonds (ENG)	(0.5)	0	0	(0.5)	0	0	0	0	0	0	0	0	(1)	0	(2)
52	Jim Wych (CAN)	(0.5)	(0.5)	–	–	–	–	(1)	–	–	–	–	–	0	0	(2)
53	Les Dodd (ENG)	(0.5)	–	(1)	0	0	0	0	(0.5)	0	0	0	0	0	0	(2)
54	Mick Fisher (ENG)	(0.5)	–	(1)	0	(0.5)	0	0	0	0	0	0	0	0	0	(2)
55	Danny Fowler (ENG)	–	–	–	–	–	–	–	(0.5)	0	(0.5)	0	(0.5)	0	0	(1.5)
56	Fred Davis (ENG)	0	0	0	0	0	0	(1)	0	0	0	0	0	0	0	(1)
57	Ian Black (SCO)	0	0	(1)	0	0	0	0	0	0	0	0	0	0	0	(1)
58	Tommy Murphy (NIR)	0	0	0	0	(0.5)	0	0	0	0	(0.5)	0	0	0	0	(1)
59	Peter Francisco (RSA)	–	–	–	–	–	–	–	0	(0.5)	0	0	0	0	0	(0.5)
60	Paul Medati (ENG)	0	0	0	0	0	0	0	0	0	0	(0.5)	0	0	0	(0.5)
61	Paddy Browne (IRL)	–	–	–	–	0	0	0	0	0	0	(0.5)	0	0	0	(0.5)
62	Robby Foldvari (AUS)	–	–	–	–	–	–	–	0	0	0	(0.5)	0	0	0	(0.5)
63	Eddie McLaughlin (SCO)	0	0	0	0	0	(0.5)	0	0	0	0	0	0	0	0	(0.5)
64	John Dunning (ENG)	0	0	–	0	0	0	0	0	(0.5)	0	–	–	0	0	(0.5)
65	Vic Harris (ENG)	0	0	0	0	0	0	0	0	0	0	0	(0.5)	0	0	(0.5)
66	Bob Harris (ENG)	0	–	0	0	0	0	0	–	–	0	–	(0.5)	0	0	(0.5)
67	John Rea (SCO)	–	–	–	–	–	–	–	0	(0.5)	0	0	0	0	0	(0.5)
68	Tony Chappel (WAL)	–	–	–	–	–	–	–	0	0	(0.5)	0	0	0	0	(0.5)
69	Jack McLaughlin (NIR)	–	–	–	–	–	–	–	0	0	(0.5)	0	0	–	0	(0.5)
70	Steve Duggan (ENG)	–	–	–	–	(0.5)	0	0	0	0	0	0	0	0	0	(0.5)
71	Billy Kelly (IRL)	(0.5)	0	0	0	0	0	0	0	0	0	0	0	0	0	(0.5)
72	Frank Jonik (CAN)	0	(0.5)	0	–	0	0	0	0	0	0	0	0	0	0	(0.5)
73	Clive Everton (WAL)	0	(0.5)	0	0	0	0	0	0	0	0	0	0	0	0	(0.5)
74	Jack Fitzmaurice (ENG)	0	(0.5)	0	0	0	0	0	0	0	0	0	0	0	0	(0.5)
75	Paddy Morgan (AUS)	–	0	0	(0.5)	0	0	0	–	–	–	–	–	0	0	(0.5)
76	Jackie Rea (NIR)	–	(0.5)	–	0	–	0	–	0	–	–	0	–	–	0	(0.5)

Snooker world rankings 1985/1986 for players without ranking points or merit points
Ranking	Name	1985 WC result
77	Gino Rigitano (CAN)	Lost 8–10 at last 48 stage
78	Geoff Foulds (ENG)	Lost 6–10 at last 48 stage
79	Dave Chalmers (ENG)	Lost 1–10 at last 48 stage
80	Jimmy van Rensberg (RSA)	Lost 9–10 at last 48 stage
81	Matt Gibson (SCO)	Lost 8–10 at last 48 stage
82	Bernie Mikkelsen (CAN)	Lost 9–10 at last-80 stage
83	Mike Hines (RSA)	Lost 7–10 at last-80 stage
84	Ian Anderson (AUS)	Lost 5–10 at last-80 stage
85	Bill Oliver (ENG)	Lost 3–10 at last-80 stage
86	Pascal Burke (IRL)	Lost 3–10 at last-80 stage
87	Joe Cagianello (CAN)	Withdrew at last-80 stage
88	Dennis Hughes (ENG)	Lost 9–10 at last-96 stage
89	Graham Cripsey (ENG)	Lost 8–10 at last-96 stage
90	Anthony Kearney (IRL)	Lost 8–10 at last-96 stage
91	Maurice Parkin (ENG)	Lost 6–10 at last-96 stage
92	Bert Demarco (SCO)	Lost 4–10 at last-96 stage
93	Paul Watchorn (IRL)	Lost 4–10 at last-96 stage
94	Bernard Bennett (ENG)	Lost 4–10 at last-96 stage
95	Derek Mienie (RSA)	Lost 4–10 at last-96 stage
96	David Greaves (ENG)	Lost 3–10 at last-96 stage
97	Mike Darrington (ENG)	Lost 2–10 at last-96 stage
98	Leon Heywood (AUS)	Lost 1–10 at last-96 stage
99	Dessie Sheehan (IRL)	Lost 9–10 in round 1
100	Roger Bales (ENG)	Lost 7–10 in round 1
101	James Giannaros (AUS)	Lost 1–10 in round 1
102	John Hargreaves (ENG)	Lost 0–10 in round 1

Preceded by 1984/1985	1985/1986	Succeeded by 1986/1987
