= 1987 Australian Masters =

Professional invitational snooker tournament

1987 Winfield Australian Masters
Tournament information
- Dates: 29 June – 8 July 1987
- Venue: North Sydney Anzac Memorial Club
- City: Sydney
- Country: Australia
- Format: Non-ranking event
- Total prize fund: AU$200,000
- Winner's share: AU$50,000
- Highest break: Alex Higgins (NIR) 115

Final
- Champion: Stephen Hendry (SCO)
- Runner-up: Mike Hallett (ENG)
- Score: 371–226 points

The 1987 Winfield Australian Masters was a professional non-ranking snooker tournament that took place between 29 June and 8 July 1987 at the North Sydney Anzac Memorial Club in Sydney, Australia. Stephen Hendry won the tournament by defeating Mike Hallett 371–226 in the final. All matches were decided on the aggregate score over five frames.

There were 16 participants in the main event. Defending champion Dennis Taylor did not participate in the 1987 event as the players managed by Barry Hearn were withdrawn from the event because of a dispute with promoter Eddie Charlton over air fares. Hendry and Hallett were both among the replacements for the withdrawn players. Four places were given to specific Australian players and Paddy Morgan and Glen Wilkinson qualified from an elimination tournament consisting of the other Australian professional players.

Following a first round win over John Campbell, Hendry defeated top seed Thorburn in the quarter-finals and Alex Higgins in the semi-final. In the other half of the draw, Hallett beat Eugene Hughes in the first round, then having led Joe Johnson by 86 going into the last of their five frames, won that match by 13 points. In the final, Hendry scored higher than Hallett in four of the five frames played. Higgins scored the highest break of the tournament, 115, in his quarter-final match against John Parrott.

The tournament was recorded for transmission as a series of one-hour weekly programmes on Australian Broadcasting Corporation Channel 2 starting on 31 August but television coverage of the tournament was cancelled after two programmes had been broadcast, following complaints from the Non-Smokers Movement about the placement of Winfield logos on the set.

== Background ==
The Australian Masters, sponsored by tobacco company Rothmans under their Winfield brand name, was established in 1979. Until 1983, matches were of a single frame, like the BBC TV show Pot Black, with the final decided on the aggregate score over three frames. From 1983 the format changed to longer matches. The 1987 edition was played between 29 June and 8 July 1987 at the North Sydney Anzac Memorial Club in Sydney, Australia, and all matches were decided on the aggregate score over five frames.

The defending champion was Dennis Taylor, who did not participate in the 1987 event as the players managed by Barry Hearn were withdrawn from the event because of a dispute with promoter Eddie Charlton over air fares. Hearn said "We have only been offered business class flights by the Australian promoter, Eddie Charlton. I asked him to pay us the club class fares and we would make our own arrangements to fly out first class. He turned that down." The withdrawn players, who were Taylor, Steve Davis, Jimmy White, Willie Thorne, Terry Griffiths, Neal Foulds and Tony Meo, were replaced by Hendry, Dene O'Kane, Dean Reynolds, Mike Hallett, Eugene Hughes, Alex Higgins and John Parrott. Four places were given to specific Australian players. Paddy Morgan and Glen Wilkinson won places at the event by qualifying from an elimination tournament consisting of the Australian professional players other than the four who were given automatic places.

The tournament was recorded for transmission as a series of one-hour weekly programmes on Australian Broadcasting Corporation (ABC) Channel 2 starting on 31 August. The ABC television coverage of the tournament was cancelled in September 1987, after two programmes had been broadcast, following complaints from the Non-Smokers Movement about the placement of Winfield logos on the set.

=== Prize fund ===
The total prize fund for the tournament was AU$200,000, awarded as shown below:

- Winner: AU$50,000
- Runner-up: AU$30,000
- Third place: AU$20,000
- Fourth place: AU$17,000
- Quarter-finalists: AU$10,000
- Last 16: AU$5,000
- Highest break: AU$3,000

== Summary ==
=== First round ===
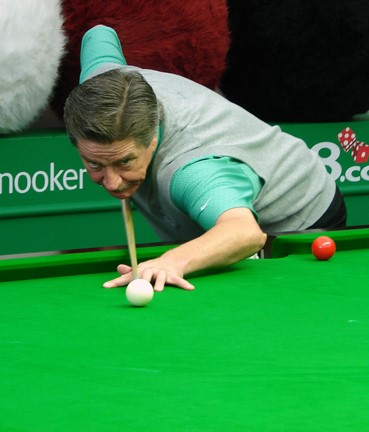
Cliff Thorburn (pictured in 2007) was the top seed but lost to Stephen Hendry in the quarter-finals.

Cliff Thorburn was 20 points behind Glen Wilkinson after their first frame but made five breaks over 30 across the next three frames and won 367–239. Stephen Hendry compiled a 66 break, his best of the whole tournament, in the first frame against John Campbell. During the third frame the players were level at 138 points each, but a break of 51 by Hendry in frame three and a 57 in frame four contributed to him leading by 61 points going into the final frame; he eventually won by 47. Dene O'Kane conceded to John Parrott when there was one red left during the fourth frame and the score was 343–89 in Parrott's favour. Warren King moved from 100 points behind Alex Higgins to a deficit of just five during frame three and in the fourth frame was a single point down at 222–223. Higgins outscored King across the rest of that match and won 379–240.

Robby Foldvari led 1984 champion Tony Knowles throughout their match, winning 344–240. Dean Reynolds built an 80-point lead against Eddie Charlton over the first two frames but Charlton took frame three by 120–0. Charlton made a 78 break in frame 5 and won 343–212. Mike Hallett led Eugene Hughes 306–152 with ten reds left in frame five, at which point Hughes conceded the match. The first frame between Joe Johnson and Paddy Morgan finished with each on 58 points. Morgan went on to establish a 127-point lead during the second frame but the two were level again at 238 points during frame 4. Johnson took the lead with four reds left in frame five and won 319–263.

=== Quarter-finals ===
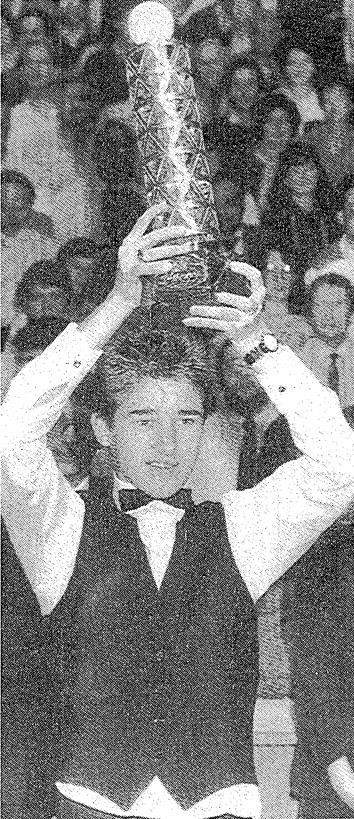
The Australian Masters was the first major title won by Stephen Hendry, who is pictured with the Grand Prix trophy in October 1987.

Hendry's best break was 56 as he defeated Thorburn 392–187. Thorburn conceded with one red left in the final frame. Hendry commented that it was probably the best win of his two-year professional career to date, adding that "Thorburn has a reputation for being the toughest competitor on the circuit and obviously I must be delighted to beat him so convincingly." A break of 115 by Higgins in the third frame was the highest of the tournament; he followed it with a 73 break in the next frame and won 364–149 when Parrott conceded at the end of that frame.

The first frame between Charlton and Foldvari lasted an hour and the second took 45 minutes. Foldvari conceded with seven reds left in frame 5, when he was trailing 176–354. Johnson lost by 13 points to Hallett, after clearing the final three colours in the fifth frame under the mistaken impression that there was a further frame to be played.

=== Semi-finals ===
Hendry led throughout his match against Higgins and had breaks of 55, 46, 64 and 34 during the first four frames. Higgins reduced the final points difference with a break of 60 in the fifth frame but still lost 235–334. In Hendry's autobiography, he wrote that Higgins, who was banned from other tournaments at the time after headbutting a referee, had tried to unsettle him by calling him "Stan Laurel" in reference to Hendry's spiky new haircut. Hendry added that after Higgins lost, "the kindness he's previously shown to me in practice, and off the table generally, turns into snarls and snipes."

Hallett led by 53 points after the first frame against Charlton but was 29 down after the second frame. With Hallett prevailing in frame three and Charlton winning frame four, the deciding frame started with Charlton 16 ahead. However, Hallett won the frame 101–3 including a break of 49 and took the match 322–235. The highest break was Hallett's 55 in the opening frame. In the play-off for third place, Higgins led by 183 points after breaks of 99 in the first frame and 93 in the second. Charlton gained the lead by a point after breaks of 48 and 41 in the third frame, and 38 and 90 in the fourth frame. Higgins had the better of the final frame and eventually won 343–284.

=== Final ===
Hendry scored higher than Hallett in four of the five frames played and won 371–226. Hendry made a break of 40 early in the first frame and went on to win it by 84–22. He won the second frame 81–51 including a break of 41; Hallett compiled a 36 break. A 63 break in frame three helped Hendry increase his lead to 129 points, as it finished 79–39, with Hallett's break of 33 contributing most of his points in the frame. In the fourth frame, Hallett reduced his deficit by taking it 89–31, including a break of 58. During the final frame, already 88 points ahead on aggregate, Hendry made a 57 clearance to win the frame 99–25. The match was completed in 51 minutes.

Hendry, at 18, became the youngest winner of a major professional snooker title, having earlier been the youngest to win a national professional championship when he won the 1986 Scottish Professional Championship.

Hallett commented afterwards that "overall [Hendry] deserved to win. The way he went off at the start I was beginning to wonder if it had been worth the effort turning up." Hendry wrote that he had been concerned about the aggregate score format before the event, but enjoyed it as it "encouraged open, attacking play" which favoured his approach. He added "I was thrilled to bits [to win] and would like to think it is the first of many triumphs."

== Main draw ==
The numbers shown to the right of the players' names are their seedings. All matches were decided on the aggregate score over five frames. Match winners are shown in bold.

First round Points based (5 frames)
**Cliff Thorburn (CAN)** (1)	**367**
Glen Wilkinson (AUS) (16)	239
John Campbell (AUS) (8)	228
**Stephen Hendry (SCO)** (9)	**335**
**John Parrott (ENG)** (5)	**343**
Dene O'Kane (NZL) (12)	89
Warren King (AUS) (13)	240
**Alex Higgins (NIR)** (4)	**379**
Tony Knowles (ENG) (3)	240
**Robby Foldvari (AUS)** (14)	**344**
**Eddie Charlton (AUS)** (11)	**343**
Dean Reynolds (ENG) (6)	212
**Mike Hallett (ENG)** (7)	**306**
Eugene Hughes (IRE) (10)	152
Paddy Morgan (AUS) (15)	263
**Joe Johnson (ENG)** (2)	**319**

Quarter-finals; Points based (5 frames)
Cliff Thorburn (CAN) (1)	187
**Stephen Hendry (SCO)** (9)	**392**
John Parrott (ENG) (5)	149
**Alex Higgins (NIR)** (4)	**364**
Robby Foldvari (AUS) (14)	176
**Eddie Charlton (AUS)** (11)	**354**
**Mike Hallett (ENG)** (7)	**293**
Joe Johnson (ENG) (2)	280

Semi-finals; Points based (5 frames)
**Stephen Hendry (SCO)** (9)	**334**
Alex Higgins (NIR) (4)	235
Eddie Charlton (AUS) (11)	240
**Mike Hallett (ENG)** (7)	**322**

Final; Points based (5 frames)
**Stephen Hendry (SCO)** (9)	**371**
Mike Hallett (ENG) (7)	226
Third place play-off
**Alex Higgins (NIR)** (4)	**343**
Eddie Charlton (AUS) (11)	284

== Qualifying ==
The qualifying competition was held at City Tattersalls Club, Sydney. Results were based on the aggregate score over five frames; known results are below. Paddy Morgan and Glen Wilkinson qualified for the main event.

First qualifying round
Player	Score	Player
George Ganim (AUS)	222–179	Leon Heywood (AUS)
Glen Wilkinson (AUS)	366–159	Greg Jenkins (AUS)
Ian Anderson (AUS)	329–176	Jim Charlton (AUS)
Lou Condo (AUS)	beat (Note: score unknown)	Gordon Robinson (AUS)

Second qualifying round
Player	Score	Player
Paddy Morgan (AUS)	308–209	George Ganim (AUS)

Third qualifying round
Player	Score	Player
Paddy Morgan (AUS)	193–179	Lou Condo (AUS)
Glen Wilkinson (AUS)	302–259	Ian Anderson (AUS)
