= 1986–87 snooker world rankings =

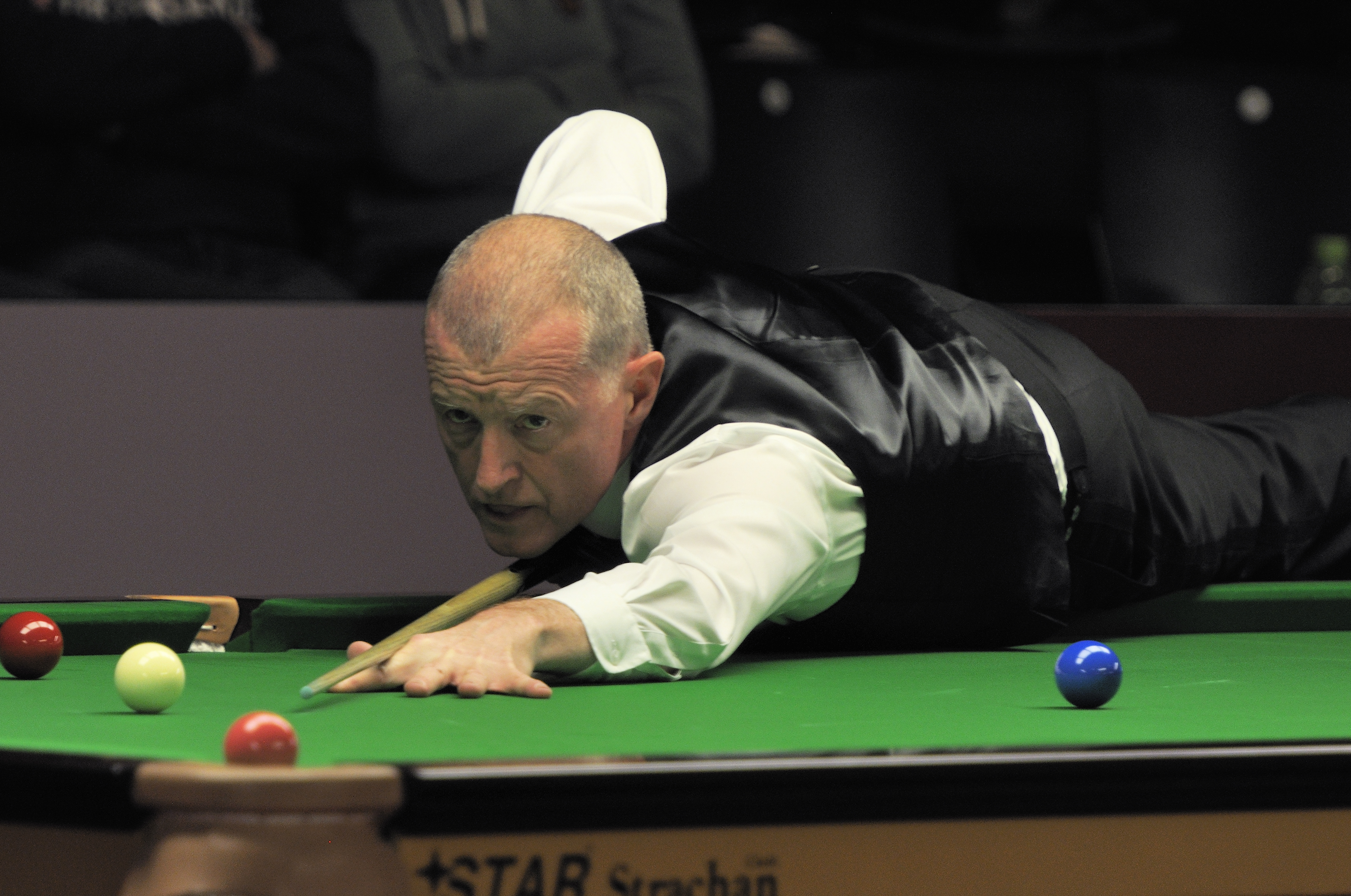
Steve Davis (pictured in 2014) was ranked in first place for the fourth consecutive year.

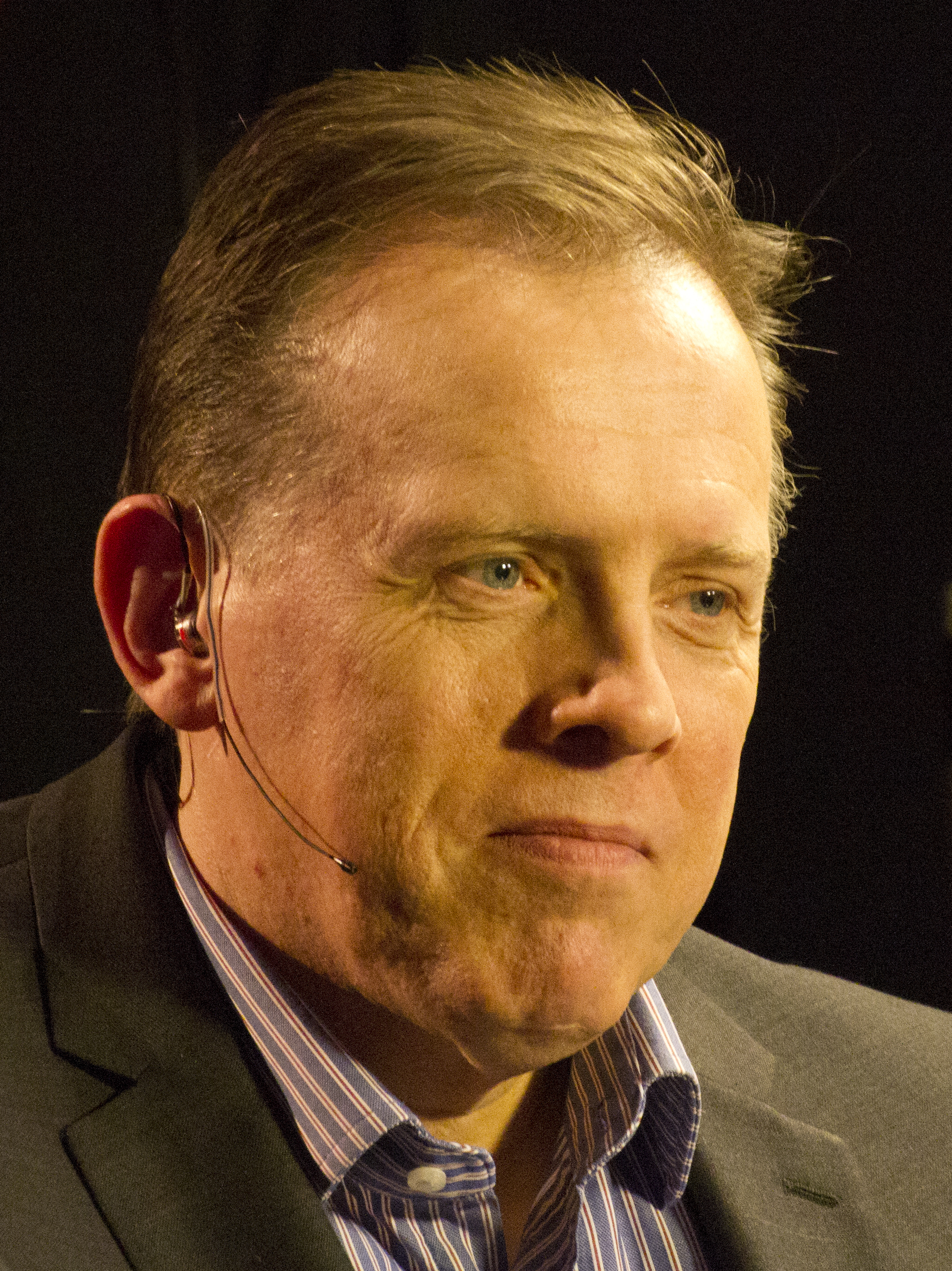
Neal Foulds (pictured in 2015) was ranked within the top 16 for the first time.

The World Professional Billiards and Snooker Association (WPBSA), the governing body for professional snooker, first introduced a ranking system for professional players in 1976, with the aim of seeding players for the World Snooker Championship. The reigning champion would be automatically seeded first, the losing finalist from the previous year seeded second, and the other seedings based on the ranking list. Initially, the rankings were based on performances in the preceding three world championships. The list for the 1986–87 snooker season was the first to only take account of results over two seasons.

Steve Davis retained first place in the rankings, with a lead described by the snooker historian Clive Everton as a "massive margin of 18 points". Also retaining his position, in second, was Cliff Thorburn, while Dennis Taylor overtook Tony Knowles for third place. The 1986 world champion Joe Johnson rose from 16th to 8th, and six-time world champion Ray Reardon fell from 6th to 15th.

Liam Kelly of the Evening Herald commented that although the WPBSA's ranking system was intended to be fair, it was "cumbersome and complicated". He noted that WPBSA chairman Rex Williams was ranked 16th instead of John Parrott, who had the same number of ranking points as Williams but more merit points, and argued that this "called into question [the] entire system." Players in the top 16 of the rankings were seeded into the last-32 round of the 1987 World Snooker Championship, and received invitations to the 1987 Masters; in the 1985–86 snooker season the top 16 players were guaranteed at least £11,773.50 in prize money, while players ranked 17th to 32nd were only guaranteed to earn £4,570.50. Williams had been ranked 27th the previous season. Neal Foulds, ranked in the top 16 for the first time for 1986–87, moved up to 13th from 23rd place. The two players who lost their places in the top 16 were Eddie Charlton, who dropped from 12th to 25th, and David Taylor who went from 14th to 21st.

The highest-ranked of the players who had been competing professionally for only one season were Barry West (30th), Tony Drago (37th) and Stephen Hendry (51st). Among the players who changed their ranking significantly from the previous year were Peter Francisco (59th to 26th), Steve Duggan (70th to 35th), and Roger Bales (100th to 66th).

== Points tariff and basis of ranking ==
Points tariff contributing to the Snooker world rankings 1986–87
Placing	1985 World Championship	Other ranking tournaments 1984–85	1986 World Championship	Other ranking tournaments 1985–86
Champion	10	5	10	6
Runner-up	8	4	8	5
Losing semi-finalist	6	3	6	4
Losing Quarter-finalist	4	2	4	3
Last 16 Loser	2	1	2	2
Last 32 Loser	1 merit point (Note: One merit point was also awarded to players who were required to compete in qualifying rounds of the world championship and reached the last 32)	0.5 merit point (Note: Half a merit point was also awarded to players who were required to compete in qualifying rounds of ranking tournaments and reached the last 32)	1 ranking point or 2 merit points (Note: Players who qualified received a ranking point. Players exempted until this round received two merit points)	1
Final qualifying round loser	–	–	2 merit points	1 merit point
Penultimate qualifying round loser	–	–	1 merit point	1 A point
Antepenultimate qualifying round loser	–	–	1 A point	Frames won counted
Preliminary round loser	–	–	Frames won counted	–

Ranking was determined as follows:

- By number of ranking points;
- If players had an equal number of ranking points, precedence was given to the player with the better performances in the 1985–86 season;
- If players were still equal, merit points were considered. If they were still tied, precedence was given to the player with the better performances in the 1985–86 season;
- If players were still equal, A points were considered. If they were still tied, precedence was given to the player with the better in the 1985–86 season;
- If players were still equal, frames won were considered. If they were still tied, precedence was given the player with the better in the 1985–86 season.

== Rankings ==
Snooker world rankings 1986–87
Ranking	Name	1984–85 season						1985–86 season						Ranking points	Merit	A points	Frames
Ranking	Name	IO	GP	UK	Cl	BO	WC	MT	GP	UK	Cl	BO	WC	Ranking points	Merit	A points	Frames
1	Steve Davis (ENG)	5	3	5	3	3	8	3	6	6	3	6	8	59	1	0	0
2	Cliff Thorburn (CAN)	0	4	3	4	1	4	6	4	2	5	2	6	41	1	0	0
3	Dennis Taylor (NIR)	2	5	1	0	2	10	4	5	4	2	0	0	35	4	0	0
4	Tony Knowles (ENG)	4	2	2	0	1	6	1	4	3	2	1	6	32	1	0	0
5	Jimmy White (ENG)	2	0	2	1	0	4	5	2	4	6	0	4	30	2	0	0
6	Alex Higgins (NIR)	2	0	4	1	3	2	2	2	2	3	4	2	27	1	0	0
7	Willie Thorne (ENG)	2	1	2	5	0	0	2	0	5	0	5	4	26	3	0	0
8	Joe Johnson (ENG)	1	0	1	3	0	0	3	2	1	3	1	10	25	3	0	0
9	Kirk Stevens (CAN)	0	2	3	1	4	2	0	3	3	0	2	4	24	3	0	0
10	Terry Griffiths (WAL)	1	0	0	2	0	4	2	3	3	0	3	4	22	1.5	0	0
11	Tony Meo (ENG)	1	1	1	0	2	2	1	2	2	2	3	0	17	3	0	0
12	Silvino Francisco (RSA)	3	1	0	0	5	0	0	3	2	0	1	2	17	5.5	0	0
13	Neal Foulds (ENG)	0	3	0	0	0	0	4	1	2	3	1	1	15	2.5	0	0
14	Doug Mountjoy (WAL)	0	2	1	0	0	2	1	1	1	4	0	2	14	1.5	0	0
15	Ray Reardon (WAL)	1	1	2	2	0	6	0	0	1	0	0	0	13	7	0	0
16	Rex Williams (ENG)	0	0	1	1	0	0	0	1	2	4	2	1	12	4	0	0
17	John Parrott (ENG)	0	0	0	0	0	4	3	0	1	0	2	2	12	4.5	0	0
18	John Campbell (AUS)	0	0	0	0	0	0	2	2	1	2	2	2	11	2.5	0	0
19	John Virgo (ENG)	1	0	0	2	0	0	1	0	1	1	4	1	11	4	0	0
20	Eugene Hughes (IRL)	3	0	0	1	2	0	0	1	0	2	0	2	11	6	0	0
21	David Taylor (ENG)	1	1	1	0	0	2	2	1	2	0	0	0	10	4.5	0	0
22	Murdo MacLeod (SCO)	0	0	0	1	1	0	2	0	2	1	2	0	9	6.5	0	0
23	Cliff Wilson (WAL)	0	0	1	1	0	0	2	3	0	0	1	1	9	3.5	0	0
24	Bill Werbeniuk (CAN)	0	0	0	0	0	2	1	0	0	2	3	1	9	2	0	0
25	Eddie Charlton (AUS)	0	1	1	0	0	2	0	1	0	0	2	2	9	3.5	0	0
26	Peter Francisco (RSA)	0	0	0	0	0	0	–	2	1	2	2	0	7	2.5	1	0
27	Mike Hallett (ENG)	0	1	0	0	0	0	0	1	1	1	1	2	7	4	0	0
28	Dave Martin (ENG)	0	0	0	0	1	0	1	1	1	1	1	1	7	1	0	0
29	Dean Reynolds (ENG)	0	2	0	0	0	0	2	0	1	1	0	1	7	4.5	0	0
30	Barry West (ENG)	–	–	–	–	–	–	0	0	3	1	0	0	4	4	0	4
31	Steve Longworth (ENG)	0	0	0	1	0	0	0	2	0	0	1	0	4	5	1	0
32	Jim Wych (CAN)	–	–	–	–	–	0	0	0	0	0	3	0	3	5	1	0
33	Danny Fowler (ENG)	0	0	0	0	0	0	0	1	1	0	0	1	3	4.5	0	0
34	John Spencer (ENG)	0	0	0	0	0	0	1	0	1	0	0	1	3	3.5	0	0
35	Steve Duggan (ENG)	0	0	0	0	0	0	3	0	0	0	0	0	3	3	2	0
36	Perrie Mans (RSA)	0	0	0	–	–	–	0	0	0	1	1	1	3	3	0	0
37	Tony Drago (MLT)	–	–	–	–	–	–	0	2	1	0	0	0	3	1	1	0
38	Marcel Gauvreau (CAN)	1	0	0	0	0	0	0	0	0	2	0	0	3	3.5	3	0
39	Dene O'Kane (NZL)	0	0	0	0	2	0	0	0	0	1	0	0	3	8	0	0
40	Steve Newbury (WAL)	1	0	0	0	1	0	0	0	0	0	1	0	3	6	1	0
41	Warren King (AUS)	0	0	0	2	0	0	1	0	0	0	0	0	3	5	2	0
42	Patsy Fagan (IRL)	0	–	0	0	0	2	0	0	0	0	1	0	3	3.5	3	0
43	Mark Wildman (ENG)	0	0	0	0	0	0	0	1	0	0	1	0	2	6	0	0
44	George Scott (ENG)	0	0	0	0	0	0	1	1	0	0	0	0	2	2.5	2	0
45	Bob Harris (ENG)	–	–	0	–	0	0	1	1	0	0	0	0	2	2.5	2	0
46	Ray Edmonds (ENG)	0	0	0	0	0	0	0	1	0	0	0	1	2	2	3	0
47	Fred Davis (ENG)	0	0	0	0	0	0	0	0	1	1	0	0	2	2	2	0
48	Paddy Browne (IRL)	0	0	0	0	0	0	0	0	0	1	1	0	2	1.5	3	0
49	Tony Chappel (WAL)	0	0	0	0	0	0	1	0	1	0	0	0	2	1.5	3	0
50	Graham Cripsey (ENG)	0	0	0	0	0	0	0	0	1	1	0	0	2	1	1	5
51	Stephen Hendry (SCO)	–	–	–	–	–	–	0	0	0	1	0	1	2	0	2	6
52	Graham Miles (ENG)	0	0	0	0	1	0	0	1	0	0	0	0	2	5	1	0
53	Bob Chaperon (CAN)	0	0	0	0	1	0	1	0	0	0	0	0	2	3.5	2	0
53	Malcolm Bradley (ENG)	0	0	0	0	1	0	1	0	0	0	0	0	2	3.5	2	0
55	Tony Jones (ENG)	0	0	0	0	0	0	0	0	0	1	0	0	1	7	0	0
56	Wayne Jones (WAL)	0	0	0	0	0	0	0	1	0	0	0	0	1	6	1	0
57	Tommy Murphy (NIR)	0	0	0	0	0	0	1	0	0	0	0	0	1	4.5	2	0
58	Paul Medati (ENG)	0	0	0	0	0	0	0	0	0	0	1	0	1	4.5	2	0
59	Jimmy van Rensberg (RSA)	–	–	–	–	–	0	0	0	0	1	0	0	1	3	3	0
60	Matt Gibson (SCO)	0	0	0	0	0	0	1	0	0	0	0	0	1	3	2	0
61	Bernie Mikkelsen (CAN)	0	0	–	0	0	0	0	0	0	1	0	0	1	3	2	0
62	John Rea (SCO)	0	0	0	0	0	0	0	0	0	0	1	0	1	2.5	3	0
63	Vic Harris (ENG)	0	0	0	0	0	0	0	0	0	1	0	0	1	2.5	3	0
64	Ian Black (SCO)	0	0	0	0	0	0	1	0	0	0	0	0	1	2	3	0
65	Joe O'Boye (IRL)	–	–	–	–	–	–	0	1	0	0	0	0	1	2	2	8
66	Roger Bales (ENG)	0	0	0	0	0	0	0	0	0	0	1	0	1	2	1	9
67	Ian Williamson (ENG)	0	1	0	0	0	0	0	0	0	0	0	0	1	2.5	4	0
68	Les Dodd (ENG)	0	0	0	0	0	0	0	0	0	0	0	0	0	5.5	2	0
69	Robby Foldvari (AUS)	0	0	0	0	0	0	0	0	0	0	0	0	0	4.5	3	0
70	Eddie Sinclair (SCO)	0	0	0	0	0	0	0	0	0	0	0	0	0	4.5	2	0
71	Jack McLaughlin (NIR)	0	0	0	0	0	0	0	0	0	0	0	0	0	4.5	2	0
72	Dave Gilbert (ENG)	0	0	0	0	0	0	0	0	0	0	0	0	0	4	1	7
73	Jim Donnelly (SCO)	0	0	0	0	0	0	0	0	0	0	0	0	0	3	3	0
74	Colin Roscoe (WAL)	0	0	0	0	0	0	0	0	0	0	0	0	0	3	3	0
75	Mario Morra (CAN)	0	0	0	0	0	0	0	0	0	0	0	0	0	3	3	0
76	Jack Fitzmaurice (ENG)	0	0	0	0	0	0	0	0	0	0	0	0	0	3	3	0
77	Mike Watterson (ENG)	0	0	0	0	0	0	0	0	0	0	0	0	0	3	2	0
78	Mike Darrington (ENG)	0	0	0	0	0	0	0	0	0	0	0	0	0	3	1	4
79	Geoff Foulds (ENG)	0	0	0	0	0	0	0	0	0	0	0	0	0	2	4	0
80	Sakchai Sim Ngam (THA)	0	0	0	0	0	0	0	0	0	0	0	0	0	2	3	2
81	Dessie Sheehan (IRL)	0	0	0	0	0	0	0	0	0	0	0	0	0	2	1	5
82	Jim Bear (CAN)	0	0	0	0	0	0	0	0	0	0	0	0	0	2	1	4
83	John Dunning (ENG)	0	0	0	0	0	0	0	0	0	0	0	0	0	1.5	1	0
84	Bill Oliver (ENG)	0	0	0	0	0	0	0	0	0	0	0	0	0	1	5	0
85	Jim Meadowcroft (ENG)	0	0	0	0	0	0	0	0	0	0	0	0	0	1	5	0
86	Gino Rigitano (CAN)	0	0	0	0	0	0	0	0	0	0	0	0	0	1	5	0
87	Mick Fisher (ENG)	0	0	0	0	0	0	0	0	0	0	0	0	0	1	5	0
88	Billy Kelly (IRL)	0	0	0	0	0	0	0	0	0	0	0	0	0	1	5	0
89	Omprakesh Agrawal (IND)	0	0	0	0	0	0	0	0	0	0	0	0	0	1	4	4
90	Eddie McLaughlin (SCO)	0	0	0	0	0	0	0	0	0	0	0	0	0	1	4	0
91	Pat Houlihan (ENG)	0	0	0	0	0	0	0	0	0	0	0	0	0	1	3	9
92	John Hargreaves (ENG)	0	0	0	0	0	0	0	0	0	0	0	0	0	1	2	10
93	Dennis Hughes (ENG)	0	0	0	0	0	0	0	0	0	0	0	0	0	1	2	10
94	Martin Smith (ENG)	0	0	0	0	0	0	0	0	0	0	0	0	0	1	2	7
95	Greg Jenkins (AUS)	0	0	0	0	0	0	0	0	0	0	0	0	0	1	1	4
96	Gerry Watson (CAN)	0	0	0	0	0	0	0	0	0	0	0	0	0	1	0	8
97	Paul Thornley (CAN)	0	0	0	0	0	0	0	0	0	0	0	0	0	1	0	0
98	Frank Jonik (CAN)	0	0	0	0	0	0	0	0	0	0	0	0	0	0	6	0
99	Dave Chalmers (ENG)	0	0	0	0	0	0	0	0	0	0	0	0	0	0	5	0
100	Clive Everton (WAL)	0	0	0	0	0	0	0	0	0	0	0	0	0	0	6	0
101	Anthony Kearney (IRL)	0	0	0	0	0	0	0	0	0	0	0	0	0	0	4	9
102	Glen Wilkinson (AUS)	0	0	0	0	0	0	0	0	0	0	0	0	0	0	3	10
103	Jackie Rea (NIR)	0	0	0	0	0	0	0	0	0	0	0	0	0	0	3	0
104	Pascal Burke (IRL)	0	0	0	0	0	0	0	0	0	0	0	0	0	0	2	17
105	Joe Cagianello (CAN)	0	0	0	0	0	0	0	0	0	0	0	0	0	0	2	0
106	Paul Watchorn (IRL)	0	0	0	0	0	0	0	0	0	0	0	0	0	0	1	19
107	David Greaves (ENG)	0	0	0	0	0	0	0	0	0	0	0	0	0	0	1	15
108	Derek Mienie (RSA)	0	0	0	0	0	0	0	0	0	0	0	0	0	0	1	14
109	Bert Demarco (SCO)	0	0	0	0	0	0	0	0	0	0	0	0	0	0	1	13
110	Jim Rempe (USA)	0	0	0	0	0	0	0	0	0	0	0	0	0	0	1	2
111	Paddy Morgan (AUS)	0	0	0	0	0	0	0	0	0	0	0	0	0	0	1	0
112	Robbie Grace (RSA)	0	0	0	0	0	0	0	0	0	0	0	0	0	0	1	0
113	Maurice Parkin (ENG)	0	0	0	0	0	0	0	0	0	0	0	0	0	0	0	12
114	Bernard Bennett (ENG)	0	0	0	0	0	0	0	0	0	0	0	0	0	0	0	11
115	Mike Hines (RSA)	0	0	0	0	0	0	0	0	0	0	0	0	0	0	0	0
116	Ian Anderson (AUS)	0	0	0	0	0	0	0	0	0	0	0	0	0	0	0	0
117	James Giannaros (AUS)	0	0	0	0	0	0	0	0	0	0	0	0	0	0	0	0
118	Leon Heywood (AUS)	0	0	0	0	0	0	0	0	0	0	0	0	0	0	0	0

Preceded by 1985–86	1986–87	Succeeded by 1987–88
