= 1984 Australian Professional Championship =

Australian Professional Championship
Tournament information
- Dates: 13–17 August 1984
- Venue: RSL Club
- City: Dubbo
- Country: Australia
- Organisation: WPBSA
- Format: Non-ranking event

Final
- Champion: Eddie Charlton
- Runner-up: Warren King
- Score: 10–3

The 1984 Toohey's Brewery Australian Professional Championship was a professional non-ranking snooker tournament, which took place in August 1984.

Eddie Charlton won the tournament defeating Warren King 10–3 in the final.

== Main draw ==
Last 16; Best of 11 frames
Robby Foldvari	6
Jim Charlton	1
George Ganim	6
Ian Anderson	5
James Giannaros	6
Lou Condo	2

Quarter-finals; Best of 11 frames
Eddie Charlton	6
Robby Foldvari	4
Paddy Morgan	6
George Ganim	4
Warren King	6
James Giannaros	5
John Campbell	6
Leon Heywood	2

Semi-finals; Best of 17 frames
Eddie Charlton	9
Paddy Morgan	2
Warren King	9
John Campbell	6

Final; Best of 19 frames
Eddie Charlton	10
Warren King	3
