= 1986 Grand Prix (snooker) =

Rothmans Grand Prix
Tournament information
- Dates: 18–26 October 1986
- Venue: Hexagon Theatre
- City: Reading
- Country: England
- Organisation: WPBSA
- Format: Ranking event
- Total prize fund: £275,000
- Winner's share: £55,000
- Highest break: Jimmy White (ENG) (138)

Final
- Champion: Jimmy White (ENG)
- Runner-up: Rex Williams (ENG)
- Score: 10–6

The 1986 Rothmans Grand Prix was a professional ranking snooker tournament that took place from 18 to 26 October 1986 at the Hexagon Theatre in Reading.

Rex Williams reached his first (and only) major final in a professional snooker tournament after being a professional since 1951. He was 53 years and 98 days old, making him the oldest player in a ranking final. He had defeated Jim Bear, Mark Wildman, Alex Higgins, Steve Davis and Neal Foulds before facing Jimmy White in the final. During that match Williams took a 5–2 lead which he had made a break of 125 in the 7th frame and 6–4 before White took the last 6 frames to win 10–6.

Rounds 1 to 3 were played at Redwood Lodge, Bristol, from 17 to 24 September 1986.

Terry Griffiths set a Grand Prix record with a break of 136 against Steve Davis in the fourth round. This was superseded by a break of 137 by Willie Thorne against Neal Foulds in round five. White then made a break of 138 against Silvino Francisco in their semi-final.

The quarter-final between White and 17-year-old Stephen Hendry went to the deciding frame. Hendry missed potting the blue ball in that frame and White went on to win. Williams nearly inflicted the first whitewash of Davis's professional career, taking a four-frame lead but then not potting a black ball that would have meant a 5–0 win. After Davis had won the fifth frame, Williams completed his victory with a break of 74 in frame 6.

In the semi-finals, White defeated Francisco 9–6, and Williams eliminated Foulds 9–8.

Williams led 5–3 at the end of the first session of the final. White took the first frame of the second session, then Williams won the next frame to lead 6–4. White then added six consecutive frames to take the title.

== Prize fund ==
The breakdown of prize money is shown below:

- Winner: £55,000
- Runner-up: £33,000
- Semi-finalists: £16,500
- Quarter-finalists: £8,250
- Last 16: £4,125
- Last 32: £2,664
- Last 64: £1,202
- Highest break, round 4 onwards: £5,500
- Highest break, rounds 1 to 3: £1,375

In addition to the prize fund, the World Professional Billiards and Snooker Association made contributions of £150 to 24 of the players who lost in rounds 1 and 2.

== Main draw ==
Round 3 (Last 64); Best of 9 frames
(England) Steve Davis	5
(Scotland) Matt Gibson	1
(Malta) Tony Drago	5
(Australia) Eddie Charlton	4
(Wales) Terry Griffiths	5
(Canada) Mario Morra	3
(Australia) John Campbell	5
(England) Geoff Foulds	0
(England) Rex Williams	5
(Canada) Jim Bear	2
(England) Mark Wildman	5
(England) Steve Longworth	2
(Northern Ireland) Alex Higgins	5
(England) Fred Davis	0
(England) Dave Martin	w/o
(England) Jim Meadowcroft	w/d
(England) Willie Thorne	5
(England) Steve Duggan	0
(Australia) Warren King	5
(Canada) Bill Werbeniuk	2
(England) Neal Foulds	5
(England) Graham Miles	1
(Wales) Cliff Wilson	5
(Australia) Ian Anderson	4
(England) Tony Meo	5
(Wales) Tony Chappel	1
(England) John Parrott	5
(England) Graham Cripsey	4
(Northern Ireland) Dennis Taylor	5
(England) Jon Wright	3
(England) John Virgo	5
(Republic of Ireland) Patsy Fagan	2
(Northern Ireland) Joe O'Boye	5
(Canada) Cliff Thorburn	4
(Wales) Steve Newbury	5
(England) Dean Reynolds	0
(South Africa) Silvino Francisco	5
(England) John Spencer	4
(Wales) Wayne Jones	5
(England) David Taylor	1
(Wales) Doug Mountjoy	5
(England) Bob Harris	2
(Canada) Jim Wych	5
(Scotland) John Rea	2
(England) Tony Knowles	5
(England) David Roe	3
(South Africa) Peter Francisco	5
(England) Paul Medati	1
(England) Jimmy White	5
(England) Tony Jones	0
(Northern Ireland) Jack McLaughlin	5
(England) Barry West	1
(England) Les Dodd	5
(Canada) Kirk Stevens	4
(England) Mike Hallett	5
(England) Vic Harris	2
(Canada) Bob Chaperon	5
(Wales) Ray Reardon	3
(Scotland) Stephen Hendry	5
(Republic of Ireland) Eugene Hughes	1
(Republic of Ireland) Paddy Browne	5
(England) Joe Johnson	2
(Wales) Mark Bennett	5
(Scotland) Murdo MacLeod	1

Round 4 (Last 32); Best of 9 frames
(England) Steve Davis	5
(Malta) Tony Drago	1
(Wales) Terry Griffiths	5
(Australia) John Campbell	1
(England) Rex Williams	5
(England) Mark Wildman	1
(Northern Ireland) Alex Higgins	5
(England) Dave Martin	2
(England) Willie Thorne	5
(Australia) Warren King	2
(England) Neal Foulds	5
(Wales) Cliff Wilson	0
(England) Tony Meo	5
(England) John Parrott	3
(Northern Ireland) Dennis Taylor	5
(England) John Virgo	1
(Northern Ireland) Joe O'Boye	2
(Wales) Steve Newbury	5
(South Africa) Silvino Francisco	5
(Wales) Wayne Jones	4
(Wales) Doug Mountjoy	5
(Canada) Jim Wych	1
(England) Tony Knowles	5
(South Africa) Peter Francisco	3
(England) Jimmy White	5
(Northern Ireland) Jack McLaughlin	2
(England) Les Dodd	2
(England) Mike Hallett	5
(Canada) Bob Chaperon	2
(Scotland) Stephen Hendry	5
(Republic of Ireland) Paddy Browne	5
(Wales) Mark Bennett	0

Round 5 (Last 16); Best of 9 frames
(England) Steve Davis	5
(Wales) Terry Griffiths	2
(England) Rex Williams	5
(Northern Ireland) Alex Higgins	1
(England) Willie Thorne	3
(England) Neal Foulds	5
(England) Tony Meo	5
(Northern Ireland) Dennis Taylor	2
(Wales) Steve Newbury	2
(South Africa) Silvino Francisco	5
(Wales) Doug Mountjoy	1
(England) Tony Knowles	5
(England) Jimmy White	5
(England) Mike Hallett	1
(Scotland) Stephen Hendry	5
(Republic of Ireland) Paddy Browne	3

Quarter-finals; Best of 9 frames
(England) Steve Davis	1
(England) Rex Williams	5
(England) Neal Foulds	5
(England) Tony Meo	3
(South Africa) Silvino Francisco	5
(England) Tony Knowles	2
(England) Jimmy White	5
(Scotland) Stephen Hendry	4

Semi-finals; Best of 17 frames
(England) Rex Williams	9
(England) Neal Foulds	8
(South Africa) Silvino Francisco	6
(England) Jimmy White	9

Final; Best of 19 frames
(England) Rex Williams	6
(England) Jimmy White	10

== Final ==
Final: Best of 19 frames. Referee: John Williams; Hexagon Theatre, Reading, England, 26 October 1986.
Jimmy White; England	10–6	Rex Williams; England
11–72 (53), 57–47, 130–3 (101), 54–73, 44–84, 44–74, 0–126 (125), 90–4 (73), 83–24, 0–76, 72–16, 79–39 (68), 79–23, 63–61, 88–8 (51), 79–8 (72)
101	Highest break	125
1	Century breaks	1
5	50+ breaks	2

== Rounds 1 and 2 ==
Results from the first two rounds are below.

Round 1 Best of 19 frames
Derek Mienie (RSA)	5
Jack Fitzmaurice (ENG)	2
Paul Watchorn (IRL)	5
Mike Darrington (ENG)	2
Mario Morra (CAN)	5
Steve James (ENG)	3
Geoff Foulds (ENG)	5
Glen Wilkinson (AUS)	3
Jim Bear (CAN)	5
Bernard Bennett (ENG)	2
Francois Ellis (RSA)	w.o.
Eddie McLauglin (SCO)
Jim Meadowcroft (ENG)	5
David Greaves (ENG)	2
Terry Whitthread (ENG)	w.o.
Sakchai Sim Ngam (THA)
Jim Donnelly (SCO)	5
Nigel Gilbert (ENG)	1
Frank Jonik (CAN)	w.o.
Leon Heywood (AUS)
Ian Anderson (AUS)	5
Bill Oliver (ENG)	4
Tony Kearney (IRL)	5
Greg Jenkins (AUS)	3
Paul Gibson (ENG)	5
John Dunning (ENG)	1
Jon Wright (ENG)	5
Mick Fisher (ENG)	1
Robbie Grace (RSA)	5
Pat Houlihan (ENG)	1
Dave Gilbert (ENG)	5
Brian Rowswell (ENG)	1
Pascal Burke (IRE)	5
Colin Roscoe (WAL)	3
Jackie Rea (NIR)	5
Dennis Hughes (ENG)	2
David Roe (ENG)	5
John Hargreaves (ENG)	1
Gino Rigitano (CAN)	5
Clive Everton (WAL)	1
Martin Smith (ENG)	5
Mike Hines (RSA)	2
Jack McLaughlin (NIR)	5
Ken Owers (ENG)	2
Billy Kelly (IRL)	5
Maurice Parkin (ENG)	2
Dave Chalmers (ENG)	5
Omprakesh Agrawal (IND)	1
Dessie Sheehan (IRE)	5
Bert Demarco (SCO)	1
Mark Bennett (WAL)	5
Mike Watterson (ENG)	1

Round 2 Best of 19 frames
Matt Gibson (SCO)	5
Derek Mienie (SAF)	4
Tony Drago (MLT)	5
Paul Watchorn (IRL)	3
Ian Black (SCO)	4
Mario Morra (CAN)	5
Bernie Mikkelsen (CAN)	1
Geoff Foulds (ENG)	5
Danny Fowler (ENG)	2
Jim Bear (CAN)	5
Mark Wildman (ENG)	5
Francois Ellis (RSA)	1
Fred Davis (ENG)	5
Roger Bales (ENG)	4
Perrie Mans (RSA)
Jim Meadowcroft (ENG)	w.o.
Steve Duggan (ENG)	5
Terry Whitthread (ENG)	1
Warren King (AUS)	5
Jim Donnelly (SCO)	2
Graham Miles (ENG)	5
Frank Jonik (CAN)	1
Tommy Murphy (NIR)	4
Ian Anderson (AUS)	5
Tony Chappel (WAL)	5
Tony Kearney (IRL)	1
Graham Cripsey (ENG)	5
Paul Gibson (ENG)	3
Malcolm Bradley (CAN)	0
Jon Wright (ENG)	5
Patsy Fagan (IRE)	5
Robbie Grace (RSA)	3
Joe O'Boye (IRE)	5
Ray Edmonds (ENG)	2
Steve Newbury (WAL)	5
Dave Gilbert (ENG)	1
John Spencer (ENG)	5
Pascal Burke (IRL)	3
Wayne Jones (WAL)	5
Robby Foldvari (AUS)	2
Bob Harris (ENG)	5
Jackie Rea (NIR)	0
John Rea (SCO)	5
Eddie Sinclair (SCO)	4
Jimmy van Rensberg (RSA)	3
David Roe (ENG)	5
Paul Medati (ENG)	5
Gino Rigitano (CAN)	1
Tony Jones (ENG)	5
Martin Smith (ENG)	0
Marcel Gauvreau (CAN)	3
Jack McLaughlin (NIR)	5
Les Dodd (ENG)	5
George Scott (ENG)	2
Vic Harris (ENG)	5
Billy Kelly (IRL)	3
Bob Chaperon (CAN)	5
Dave Chalmers (ENG)	2
Stephen Hendry (SCO)	5
Ian Williamson (ENG)	1
Paddy Browne (IRE)	5
Dessie Sheehan (IRL)	4
Dene O'Kane (NZL)	2
Mark Bennett (WAL)	5

== Century breaks ==
Round 4 onwards

- 138, 114, 101 – Jimmy White
- 137 – Willie Thorne
- 136 – Terry Griffiths
- 125 – Rex Williams
- 106 – Stephen Hendry
- 103 – John Parrott

Rounds 1 to 3

- 134 – Tony Chappel
- 124 – Tony Knowles
- 113 – Willie Thorne
- 108 – Eddie Charlton
- 107 – Stephen Hendry
- 102– Wayne Jone
- 101 – Jim Bear
