= 1988 Australian Professional Championship =

Australian Professional Championship
Tournament information
- Dates: 18–24 July 1988
- Venue: Roots Hill Retired Soldiers Club
- City: Sydney
- Country: Australia
- Organisation: Australian Professional Association
- Format: Non-ranking event
- Total prize fund: A$15,100
- Winner's share: A$4,000
- Highest break: (Australia) Robby Foldvari (124)

Final
- Champion: (Australia) John Campbell
- Runner-up: (Australia) Robby Foldvari
- Score: 9–7

The 1988 Australian Professional Championship was a professional non-ranking snooker tournament, which took place between 18 and 24 July 1988 at the Roots Hill Retired Soldiers Club in Sydney, Australia. This was the final edition of the tournament.

John Campbell won the tournament defeating Robby Foldvari 9–7 in the final.

== Main draw ==
Results of the tournament are shown below. Winning players are denoted in bold, and numbers in parentheses show seedings. An asterisk denotes that the player was a member of the Australian Professional Association but not of the World Professional Billiards and Snooker Association.

First Round
(Australia) **Vladimir Potazsnyk***	5
(Australia) Edward Charlton*	1

Second round
(Australia) **Sam Frangie***	**5**
(Australia) Lou Condo	2
**(Australia) Vladimir Potazsnyk***	**5**
(Australia) Glen Wilkinson	3
(Australia) Ian Anderson	**5**
(Australia) James Giannaros	2
(Australia) Greg Jenkins	**5**
(Australia) Paddy Morgan	3

Quarter-finals
**(Australia) Warren King** (1)	**5**
(Australia) Sam Frangie*	4
(Australia) **Robby Foldvari** (4)	**5**
(Australia) Vladimir Potazsnyk*	3
(Australia) **John Campbell** (3)	**5**
(Australia) Ian Anderson	0
(Australia) **Eddie Charlton** (2)	**5**
(Australia) Greg Jenkins	0

Semi-finals
(Australia) Warren King (1)	4
(Australia) **Robby Foldvari** (4)	**8**
(Australia) **John Campbell** (3)	**8**
(Australia) Eddie Charlton (2)	6

Final
(Australia) Robby Foldvari (4)	7
(Australia) **John Campbell** (3)	**9**
