= 1985 Australian Professional Championship =

Australian Professional Championship
Tournament information
- Dates: 2–11 August 1985
- Venue: Orange RSL
- City: Sydney
- Country: Australia
- Organisation: WPBSA
- Format: Non-ranking event
- Winner's share: £4,250
- Highest break: Warren King (130)

Final
- Champion: John Campbell
- Runner-up: Eddie Charlton
- Score: 10–7

The 1985 Australian Professional Championship was a professional non-ranking snooker tournament, which took place between 2 and 11 August 1985 at the Orange RSL Club in Sydney, Australia.

John Campbell won the tournament defeating Eddie Charlton 10–7 in the final.

== Main draw ==
Quarter-finals; Best of 15 frames
John Campbell	8
Robby Foldvari	5
Warren King	8
Ian Anderson	2
Eddie Charlton	8
Glen Wilkinson	2
Paddy Morgan	8
James Giannaros	4

Semi-finals; Best of 17 frames
John Campbell	9
Warren King	6
Eddie Charlton	9
Paddy Morgan	3

Final; Best of 19 frames
John Campbell	10
Eddie Charlton	7
