= 1986 Australian Professional Championship =

Australian Professional Championship
Tournament information
- Dates: 14–22 August 1986
- Venue: WIN 4 Studios
- City: Wollongong
- Country: Australia
- Organisation: WPBSA
- Format: Non-ranking event
- Winner's share: £3,061
- Highest break: Warren King (111)

Final
- Champion: Warren King
- Runner-up: John Campbell
- Score: 10–3

The 1986 Australian Professional Championship was a professional non-ranking snooker tournament, which took place between 14 and 22 August 1986 at the WIN 4 Studios in Wollongong, Australia.

Warren King won the tournament defeating John Campbell 10–3 in the final.

== Main draw ==
Quarter-finals; Best of 11 frames
Warren King	6
Lou Condo	3
Eddie Charlton	6
Ian Anderson	2
John Campbell	6
Glen Wilkinson	1
Robby Foldvari	6
Paddy Morgan	2

Semi-finals; Best of 15 frames
Warren King	8
Eddie Charlton	6
John Campbell	8
Robby Foldvari	3

Final; Best of 19 frames
Warren King	10
John Campbell	3
