= 1987 Australian Professional Championship =

Australian Professional Championship
Tournament information
- Dates: 13–19 July 1987
- Venue: Lakemba Club
- City: Sydney
- Country: Australia
- Organisation: WPBSA
- Format: Non-ranking event
- Winner's share: £2,222
- Highest break: Warren King (120)

Final
- Champion: Warren King
- Runner-up: Eddie Charlton
- Score: 10–7

The 1987 Australian Professional Championship was a professional non-ranking snooker tournament, which took place between 13 and 19 July 1987 at the Lakemba Club in Sydney, Australia.

Warren King won the tournament defeating Eddie Charlton 10–7 in the final.

== Main draw ==
Quarter-finals; Best of 11 frames
Warren King	6
Greg Jenkins	4
Robby Foldvari	6
Sam Frangie	2
Eddie Charlton	6
Ian Anderson	2
John Campbell	6
Glen Wilkinson	4

Semi-finals; Best of 15 frames
Warren King	8
Robby Foldvari	1
Eddie Charlton	8
John Campbell	6

Final; Best of 19 frames
Warren King	10
Eddie Charlton	7
