= 1994 Australian Open (snooker) =

Australian Open
Tournament information
- Dates: 1–7 August 1994
- Venue: Bentleigh Club
- City: Melbourne
- Country: Australia
- Organisation: Australian Billiards and Snooker Association
- Format: Non-ranking event

Final
- Champion: (Scotland) John Higgins
- Runner-up: (England) Willie Thorne
- Score: 9–5

The 1994 Australian Open was a professional non-ranking snooker tournament that took place between 1–7 August 1994 at the Bentleigh Club in Melbourne, Australia.

John Higgins won the tournament by defeating Willie Thorne 9–5 in the final.

== Main draw ==
Last 32; Best of 9 frames
(Scotland) John Higgins	5
(Hong Kong) Wong Kok Wai	4
(Thailand) Anan Terananon	5
(Australia) Michael Tillman	1
(Australia) Warren King	5
(Australia) Roger Farebrother	3
(Australia) Lee Sienkiewicz	5
(Australia) Steve Ebejer	3
(New Zealand) Dene O'Kane	5
(Australia) Johl Younger	0
(Australia) Philip Reilly	5
(Australia) Nick Provenzano	1
(Australia) Robby Foldvari	5
(Australia) Jim Bonner	4
(Australia) George Ganim	5
(Australia) Daniel Gimenez	3
(England) Willie Thorne	5
(Australia) Lim Cher Wee	2
(Australia) Andrew Hicks	5
(Australia) Les Higgins	4
(Australia) Stan Gorski	5
(Australia) Darren Johnson	2
(Thailand) Somporn Kanthawung	5
(Australia) Robin Beggs	2
(Wales) Mark Williams	5
(Australia) James Giannaros	1
(Australia) Craig Duffy	5
(Australia) Glen Wilkinson	2
(Australia) Eddie Charlton	5
(New Zealand) Chris McBreen	0
(Australia) Paul Balzer	5
(Australia) Peter Udyez	3

Last 16; Best of 9 frames
(Scotland) John Higgins	5
(Thailand) Anan Terananon	2
(Australia) Warren King	5
(Australia) Lee Sienkiewicz	3
(New Zealand) Dene O'Kane	5
(Australia) Philip Reilly	0
(Australia) Robby Foldvari	5
(Australia) George Ganim	2
(England) Willie Thorne	5
(Australia) Andrew Hicks	3
(Australia) Stan Gorski	5
(Thailand) Somporn Kanthanwung	4
(Wales) Mark Williams	5
(Australia) Craig Duffy	2
(Australia) Eddie Charlton	5
(Australia) Paul Balzer	3

Quarter-finals; Best of 13 frames
(Scotland) John Higgins	7
(Australia) Warren King	3
(New Zealand) Dene O'Kane	7
(Australia) Robby Foldvari	4
(England) Willie Thorne	7
(Australia) Stan Gorski	1
(Wales) Mark Williams	7
(Australia) Eddie Charlton	2

Semi-finals; Best of 13 frames
(Scotland) John Higgins	7
(New Zealand) Dene O'Kane	2
(England) Willie Thorne	7
(Wales) Mark Williams	1

Final; Best of 17 frames
(Scotland) John Higgins	9
(England) Willie Thorne	5
