= 1984 World Snooker Championship =

Professional snooker tournament

1984 Embassy World Snooker Championship
Tournament information
- Dates: 21 April – 7 May 1984
- Venue: Crucible Theatre
- City: Sheffield
- Country: England
- Organisation: WPBSA
- Format: Ranking event
- Total prize fund: £200,000
- Winner's share: £44,000
- Highest break: Rex Williams (ENG) (138)

Final
- Champion: Steve Davis (ENG)
- Runner-up: Jimmy White (ENG)
- Score: 18–16

The 1984 World Snooker Championship (also referred to as the 1984 Embassy World Snooker Championship for the purpose of sponsorship) was a ranking professional snooker tournament that took place between 21 April and 7 May 1984 at the Crucible Theatre in Sheffield, England. The event was organised by the World Professional Billiards and Snooker Association, and was the eighth consecutive World Snooker Championship to be held at the Crucible since the 1977 event. The event featured 94 participants, of which 78 players competed in a qualifying event held at the Redwood Lodge in Bristol from 1 to 13 April. Of these, 16 players qualified for the main stage in Sheffield, where they met 16 invited seeds. The total prize fund for the event was £200,000, the highest total pool for any snooker tournament at that time; the winner received £44,000.

The defending champion was English player Steve Davis, who had won the title twice previously. He met fellow-countryman Jimmy White in the final, which was played as a best-of-35-frames match. Davis took a significant lead of 12–4 after the first two sessions; although White battled back into the match, Davis eventually won 18–16, becoming the first player to retain the title at the Crucible. Rex Williams secured the championship's highest break, scoring a 138 in the 12th frame of his first-round loss to White. Eight century breaks were made during the competition, the fewest since the 1978 event. The tournament was sponsored by cigarette manufacturer Embassy, and broadcast by BBC.

== Tournament format ==
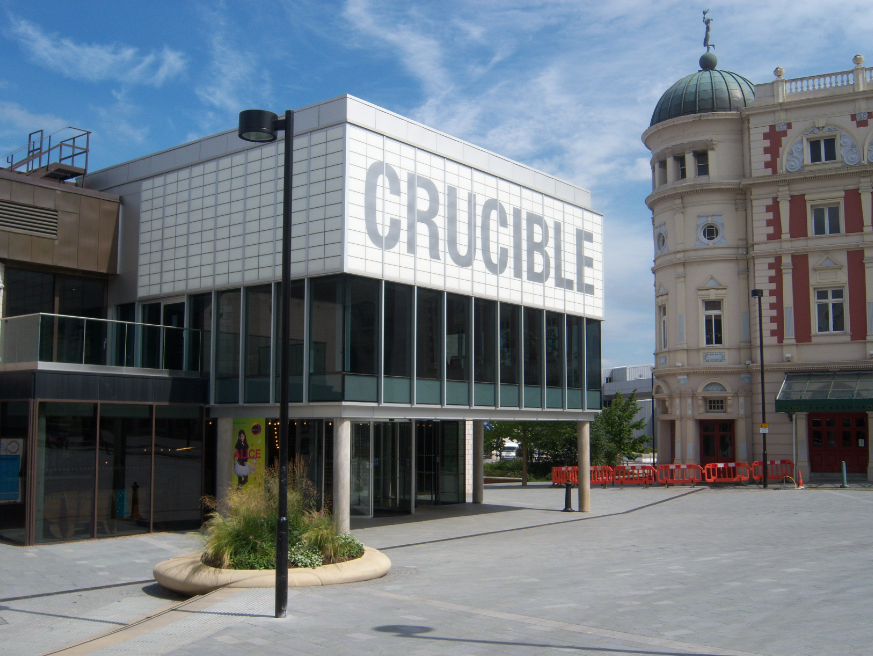
The main draw of the tournament was played at the Crucible Theatre in Sheffield, England.

The 1984 World Snooker Championship was a professional snooker tournament that took place between 21 April and 7 May 1984 at the Crucible Theatre in Sheffield, England. The event was the 1984 edition of the World Snooker Championship, which was first held in 1927. It was the last ranking event of the 1984–85 snooker season on the World Snooker Tour. The event was organised by World Snooker and the World Professional Billiards and Snooker Association (WPBSA). There were a total of 94 entrants from the tour, with one player withdrawing, and the competition's main draw had 32 participants. A three-round knockout qualifying competition with 78 players was held from 1 to 13 April, producing the 16 qualifying players who progressed into the main draw to play the top 16 seeds.

The top 16 players in the latest world rankings automatically qualified for the main draw as seeded players. (Note: The top 15 players were seeded for the event, plus the defending champion.) As defending champion, Steve Davis was seeded first for the event; the remaining 15 were allocated based on world rankings for the previous season. Matches in the first round of the main draw were played as best-of-19-frames. The number of frames needed to win a match increased to 13 in the second round and quarter-finals, and 16 in the semi-finals; the final match was played as best-of-35-frames.

The tournament was televised on BBC in the United Kingdom. During the last session of the final, the number of viewers varied from 6.3 million (when popular soap opera Coronation Street aired on ITV) to a peak of 13.1 million in the last 15 minutes of the match. The world number five Alex Higgins provided commentary on selected matches.

=== Prize fund ===
The prize fund for the event was the largest for any snooker tournament to that date, at £200,000 with the winner receiving £44,000. The breakdown of prize money for the event is shown below:

- Winner: £44,000
- Runner-up: £22,000
- Semi-finals: £12,700
- Quarter-finals: £6,600
- Last 16: £4,350
- Last 32: £2,200
- Final qualifying round losers: £450
- Highest break (in the main competition): £4,000
- Highest break (in qualifying): £1,000
- Maximum break: £15,000
- Total: £200,000

== Summary ==
=== Qualifying ===
A 78-competitor qualifying tournament for the event was held at Redwood Lodge in Bristol, from 1 April to 14 April 1984. The players were divided into 16 groups, with matches played on a knockout basis to produce 16 qualifiers. All qualifying matches were the best-of-19-frames. Tommy Murphy made two breaks of 108 in his first round defeat of Jack Fitzmaurice, two weeks after his win over Fitzmaurice in the World Professional Billiards Championship. John Parrott progressed after winning three rounds, beating Dennis Hughes 10–3, Clive Everton 10–2 and the 1978 World Snooker Championship runner-up Perrie Mans 10–0. Neal Foulds, aged 20, the British junior snooker champion, also won three matches to make his Crucible debut, defeating Doug French 10–5, Les Dodd 10–4 and Jim Meadowcroft 10–2.

Eight-time former world champion Fred Davis won his match against Jim Donnelly 10–5. Canadian John Bear, was scheduled to play but did not, and Roy Andrewartha received a walkover for the match. Mike Watterson, who as promoter of the world championship from 1977 to 1983 had first selected the Crucible as the tournament venue, defeated Bernard Bennett 10–5 in the first round before losing 8–10 to Warren King. Losers in the qualifying rounds received £450. Andrewartha, Foulds, Parrott, King, Marcel Gauvreau, Joe Johnson, Paul Mifsud, Mario Morra, and Eddie Sinclair made their World Championship debuts in qualifying.

=== First round ===
The first round took place from 21 to 26 April. The matches were contested between the seeded players and qualifiers with each played over two sessions as best-of-19 frames. David Taylor, who was trailing 3–5 to Marcel Gauvreau after their first session, won seven frames in a row to win 10–5 and gain his first ranking points of the season. Roy Andrewartha, a time and motion analyst who played professional snooker part-time, lost 4–10 to Eddie Charlton. Neal Foulds took the last three frames of their first session to lead former world champion Alex Higgins 5–3, and having the more consistent long potting in the match, won 10–9 after the scores had been level at 7–7.

Silvino Francisco defeated Tony Meo, who to that point had been the fourth-highest earner on the snooker circuit that season, 10–5. Willie Thorne defeated John Virgo for the second consecutive world championship. Virgo's defeat came at the end of a season in which he failed to win any ranking points, and he dropped out of the top 16, to 18th. Eight-time champion Fred Davis made his last appearance at the World Championships, losing 4–10 to Bill Werbeniuk in the first round. Davis had first played in the World Championship in 1937. Aged 70 years and 253 days, he became the tournament's oldest-ever player.

Many of the matches had one-sided scorelines. Dennis Taylor and Kirk Stevens both won 10–1; Terry Griffiths won 10–2; Steve Davis, John Spencer and Cliff Thorburn won 10–3; and Bill Werbeniuk, Doug Mountjoy and Eddie Charlton won 10–4. Four of the top 16 seeded players lost in the first round: Tony Knowles (fourth seed), Alex Higgins (fifth), John Virgo (fourteenth) and Tony Meo (fifteenth).

Knowles, who had been the only player to beat Steve Davis in the World Championship in the previous three years, lost 7–10 to John Parrott. Knowles had recently featured in a three-part series in the tabloid newspaper The Sun, where he boasted of his sexual adventures and was dismissive of most other competitors in the tournament. The articles led to Knowles being fined £5,000, imposed by the WPBSA for bringing the sport into disrepute.

In the other matches, second seed Ray Reardon beat Jim Wych 10–7, and Jimmy White beat Rex Williams 10–6. Williams made the first century break of the tournament in the 12th frame, a total clearance of 138, the highest break of the tournament. In the first round, 233 frames were played out of a possible 304, with an average frame time of 22.5 minutes. The longest frame, between Cliff Thorburn and Mario Morra, took 51 minutes, whilst the shortest was 9 minutes, in the Jimmy White and Rex Williams match.

=== Second round ===
Matches in the second round were best-of-25 frames, and scheduled to each be played over three sessions taking place between 26 and 30 April. Davis took seven from eight frames and compiled breaks of 100, 95, and 92 against Spencer to win 13–5 after leading 6–4. White trailed 3–5 against Charlton at the end of the first session. White made breaks of 80, 79, 44, 61, 34, and 82 to lead 10–6 and went on to win 13–7. Griffiths beat Werbeniuk 13–5.

Dennis Taylor led Parrott 11–7, before Parrott won four frames in a row to level at 11–11. Taylor, who was the more consistent potter during the match, took the next two to win 13–11. Thorburn and Thorne contested a tight match that Thorburn won 13–11. From 9–9 against David Taylor, Stevens scored three breaks of over 50 to win the match 13–10. Neal Foulds led Doug Mountjoy 3–1, but ended up losing 6–13.

Reardon, having his least successful season in 17 years as a snooker professional, made a 109 break in the eighth frame to lead 5–3 at the end of the first session against Francisco. The score was tied at 8–8 after the second session. In the last session, Francisco was ahead, but under-hit when trying to pot the blue. This left Reardon needing one snooker rather than three; Francisco fouled, giving Reardon the additional points required. Reardon went on to win the frame on a re-spotted black after Francisco failed the pot and left the black ball over the jaws of a pocket. From 9–8, Reardon won four frames in a row to win the match 13–8.

=== Quarter-finals ===
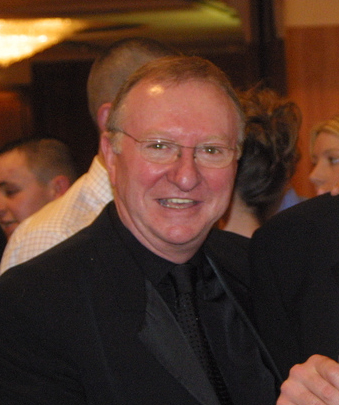
Dennis Taylor (pictured in 2004) defeated Doug Mountjoy 13–8 in the quarter-finals.

The quarter-finals were scheduled to each be played over three sessions, on 1 and 2 May, as best-of-25-frames matches. Steve Davis won the first three frames of his match against Terry Griffiths, but Griffiths won the next five frames to lead 5–3. Griffiths then won the first frame of the second session to lead 6–3. Davis, however, pulled back to level the match at 6–6, and the second session ended tied at 8–8. Davis won five of the seven frames in the third session to win 13–10 in a highly technical and safety-oriented match.

Stevens and Reardon's first session finished a frame early, with Reardon commenting that he "was glad it was over" having only won a single frame. Reardon won just the first and ninth frames as Stevens defeated him convincingly, 13–2, with a session to spare. Stevens set up a semi-final with Jimmy White, who had defeated Cliff Thorburn 13–8. White led 10–6 after the second session, before moving to 12-7 ahead. White went 63 points ahead in frame 20, but Thorburn made a clearance of 64 to win the frame, before White won the match in frame 21. Dennis Taylor defeated Doug Mountjoy, also 13–8, to move into the other semi-final, against Davis.

=== Semi-finals ===
The semi-finals were scheduled to each be played over four sessions, on 3, 4 and 5 May, as best-of-31-frames matches. Steve Davis led Dennis Taylor 4–3 at the end of their first session, with Taylor winning two of his three frames on the final black ball. Davis won the next three frames to lead 7–3 before Taylor won frames 11 and 12. On a break of 64, Taylor missed a red ball, allowing Davis to make a break of 65 to win the next frame and then make a break of 76 lead 9–5 lead at the end of their second session. Taylor won just one of the first five frames in the third session; Davis lead 13–6, but Taylor won the next two frames to avoid losing with a session to spare. Leading 14–8, Davis won three frames to Taylor's one in their last session to win 16–9.

In the other match, Stevens won the opening frame despite needing snookers, but White won the next three to lead 3–1 before the mid-session interval. At this time, White was "violently sick", having celebrated his 22nd birthday the night before. White took a 5–3 lead after the first session, also leaving to be sick after making a break of 85 in frame five. White attributed his illness to some sandwiches he had eaten and some cough syrup he had used to recover from a throat infection. The first seven frames of the second session was played in just 90 minutes as Stevens tied the match at 6–6, and then led 8–7 after their second session. Stevens won the next three frames to lead by four with White faltering. White, however, won the next three before Stevens won the final frame of the third session to lead 12–10. White won five frames in a row after Stevens missed a frame ball red in frame 23 to lead 15–12. Just one frame from defeat, Stevens won the next two frames, but White won frame 30 with a break of 44. The match finished 16–14, with White becoming the youngest player to reach a professional snooker World Championship final.

=== Final ===
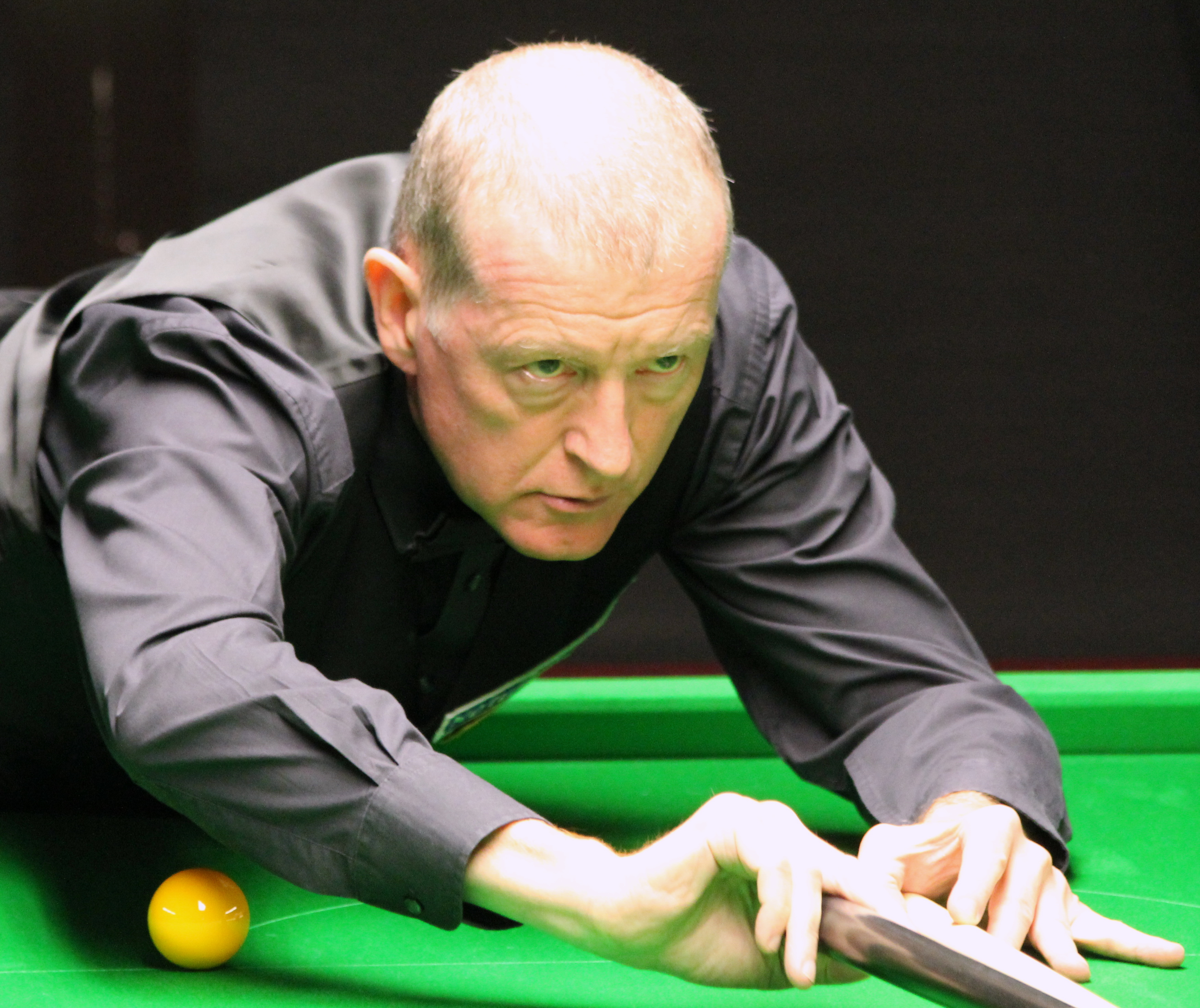
Steve Davis (pictured in 2012) defeated Jimmy White 18–16 in the final, retaining the title and winning his third world championship.

The final was played over four sessions, on 6 and 7 May, as a best-of-35-frames match between Steve Davis and Jimmy White. English referee Jim Thorpe presided over the match, taking charge of his third Triple Crown final, after two prior UK Championship finals in 1980 and 1984.

Davis dominated the first session to lead 6–1. He then extended the lead by winning the first two frames of the second session with breaks of 41, 37 and 44. White won the next frame with two breaks over 50, but was 10–2 behind at the mid-session interval. White won the next two frames, but went in-off in frame 15, which he lost. Davis won the next frame to extend his lead to 12–4 at the end of the second session. On the second day, White fought back to 11–13 by winning seven of the eight frames in the third session. In 2020, Davis commented that he had gone "into [his] shell" after leading by so much overnight. The first frame he made a break of 119 which was the second-highest of the tournament. Davis started the final session by winning three of the first four frames to lead 16–12. White then won the next three to put himself just one behind at 15–16. Davis won a close frame by clearing the colours to lead 17–15, then White took the next with a break of 65 to reduce his deficit to 16–17. Davis took the last frame 77–40 to win 18–16 and become the first player to retain the championship at the Crucible.

The victory was Davis' third world championship, having previously won in 1981 and 1983. White's loss was the first of six world championship final defeats. He was the youngest player to compete in a world championship final; however, by losing the match he missed his chance to supersede Alex Higgins as the youngest-ever winner. Davis received £44,000 for winning the tournament, taking his prize money for the 1983–84 season to £159,511, more than double that of the second-highest earner, White, who made £78,725. When the world rankings were updated following the tournament, Davis was in first place; White was seventh, earning eight of his seventeen ranking points from being the championship runner-up.

"I was so confident that I'd win it the next year or the year after that I was okay losing"

— Jimmy White commenting in retrospect on the event.

Davis received boos and jeers from the crowd after defeating the popular White. Davis commented that White had outplayed him on the final day of the final and had "played his brains out". Davis would reach the final again for the following two years, and win a further three championships throughout the 1980s. White, however, stated that he played poorly on the first day of the final because of the lengthy semi-final win over Stevens. This was the first of, as of 2026, six world championship finals that White would lose. Despite this, White was confident that he would win the championship in the following years. White later recounted that he had used crack cocaine to cope with the loss, claiming to have spent £32,000 on the drug over a three-month period.

== Qualifying ==
A three-round knockout qualifying competition was held from 1 to 13 April at the Redwood Lodge in Bristol, producing the 16 qualifying players who progressed into the main draw to play the top 16 seeds. Winners' names are shown in bold.

**Round 1** Best of 19 frames
**John Parrott (ENG)**	**10**
Dennis Hughes (ENG)	3
**Bernie Mikkelsen (CAN)**	10
Paul Medati (ENG)	8
**Mario Morra (CAN)**	**10**
Geoff Foulds (ENG)	2
**Tommy Murphy (NIR)**	**10**
Jack Fitzmaurice (ENG)	8
**Wayne Sanderson (CAN)**	**10**
Paddy Morgan (AUS)	8
**Paul Mifsud (MLT)**	**10**
Eugene Hughes (IRL)	5
**Jimmy van Rensberg (RSA)**	**10**
Vic Harris (ENG)	7
**Ray Edmonds (ENG)**	**10**
David Greaves (ENG)	0
**Ian Williamson (ENG)**	**10**
Pat Houlihan (ENG)	5
**Mike Hines (RSA)**	**10**
Ian Black (SCO)	5
**Matt Gibson (SCO)**	**10**
Gino Rigitano (CAN)	7
**Mick Fisher (ENG)**	**10**
Paul Thornley (CAN)	8
**Eddie McLaughlin (SCO)**	**10**
John Hargreaves (ENG)	5
**Roy Andrewartha (WAL)**	w.o.
John Bear (CAN)	w/d
**Jim Wych (CAN)**	**10**
George Ganim (AUS)	1
**George Scott (ENG)**	**10**
Leon Heywood (AUS)	7
**Paddy Browne (IRL)**	**10**
Steve Duggan (ENG)	9
**Colin Roscoe (WAL)**	**10**
Bert Demarco (SCO)	7
**Marcel Gauvreau (CAN)**	**10**
John Campbell (AUS)	7
**Graham Cripsey (ENG)**	**10**
Maurice Parkin (ENG)	4
**Ian Anderson (AUS)**	**10**
Gerry Watson (CAN)	4
**Jim Donnelly (SCO)**	**10**
Paul Watchorn (IRL)	7
**Warren King (AUS)**	**10**
Tony Jones (ENG)	9
**Mike Watterson (ENG)**	**10**
Bernard Bennett (ENG)	5
**Joe Cagianello (CAN)**	**10**
Mike Darrington (ENG)	7
**Bill Oliver (ENG)**	**10**
John Dunning (ENG)	3
**Neal Foulds (ENG)**	**10**
Doug French (ENG)	5
**Les Dodd (ENG)**	**10**
James Giannaros (AUS)	1
**Bob Harris (ENG)**	**10**
Dessie Sheehan (IRL)	3
**Pascal Burke (IRL)**	**10**
Billy Kelly (IRL)	7

**Round 2** Best of 19 frames
Clive Everton (WAL)	2
**John Parrott (ENG)**	**10**
Frank Jonik (CAN)	9
**Bernie Mikkelsen (CAN)**	**10**
**Mario Morra (CAN)**	**10**
Tommy Murphy (NIR)	5
Wayne Sanderson (CAN)	5
**Paul Mifsud (MLT)**	**10**
**Jimmy van Rensberg (RSA)**	**10**
Ray Edmonds (ENG)	9
**Ian Williamson (ENG)**	**10**
Mike Hines (RSA)	6
**Matt Gibson (SCO)**	**10**
Mick Fisher (ENG)	7
Eddie McLaughlin (SCO)	8
**Roy Andrewartha (WAL)**	**10**
**Jim Wych (CAN)**	**10**
George Scott (ENG)	6
**Paddy Browne (IRL)**	**10**
Colin Roscoe (WAL)	4
**Marcel Gauvreau (CAN)**	**10**
Graham Cripsey (ENG)	1
Ian Anderson (AUS)	6
**Jim Donnelly (SCO)**	**10**
**Warren King (AUS)**	**10**
Mike Watterson (ENG)	8
Joe Cagianello (CAN)	7
**Bill Oliver (ENG)**	**10**
**Neal Foulds (ENG)**	**10**
Les Dodd (ENG)	4
Bob Harris (ENG)	4
**Pascal Burke (IRL)**	**10**

**Round 3** Best of 19 frames
Perrie Mans (RSA)	0
**John Parrott (ENG)**	**10**
**Willie Thorne (ENG)**	**10**
Bernie Mikkelsen (CAN)	3
Dean Reynolds (ENG)	7
**Mario Morra (CAN)**	**10**
Cliff Wilson (WAL)	8
**Paul Mifsud (MLT)**	**10**
**Silvino Francisco (RSA)**	**10**
Jimmy van Rensberg (RSA)	3
**Graham Miles (ENG)**	**10**
Ian Williamson (ENG)	6
**Joe Johnson (ENG)**	**10**
Matt Gibson (SCO)	3
Mark Wildman (ENG)	9
**Roy Andrewartha (WAL)**	**10**
Patsy Fagan (IRL)	3
**Jim Wych (CAN)**	**10**
**Eddie Sinclair (SCO)**	**10**
Paddy Browne (IRL)	1
Murdo MacLeod (SCO)	6
**Marcel Gauvreau (CAN)**	**10**
**Fred Davis (ENG)**	**10**
Jim Donnelly (SCO)	5
Dave Martin (ENG)	8
**Warren King (AUS)**	**10**
**Rex Williams (ENG)**	**10**
Bill Oliver (ENG)	8
Jim Meadowcroft (ENG)	2
**Neal Foulds (ENG)**	**10**
**Mike Hallett (ENG)**	**10**
Pascal Burke (IRL)	5

== Main draw ==
Shown below are the results for each round of the main competition. Numbering in brackets shows player's seed, whilst those in bold denote match winners.

**First round** Best of 19 frames
21 April
**Steve Davis (ENG) (1)**	**10**
Warren King (AUS)	3
21 & 22 April
**John Spencer (ENG) (16)**	**10**
Graham Miles (ENG)	3
22 & 23 April
**Terry Griffiths (WAL) (9)**	**10**
Paul Mifsud (MLT)	2
22 & 23 April
**Bill Werbeniuk (CAN) (8)**	**10**
Fred Davis (ENG)	4
23 & 24 April
Alex Higgins (NIR) (5)	9
**Neal Foulds (ENG)**	**10**
24 & 25 April
**Doug Mountjoy (WAL) (12)**	**10**
Mike Hallett (ENG)	4
24 & 25 April
**Dennis Taylor (NIR) (13)**	**10**
Joe Johnson (ENG)	1
25 & 26 April
Tony Knowles (ENG) (4)	7
**John Parrott (ENG)**	**10**
25 & 26 April
**Cliff Thorburn (CAN) (3)**	**10**
Mario Morra (CAN)	3
25 April
John Virgo (ENG) (14)	9
**Willie Thorne (ENG)**	**10**
24 April
**Jimmy White (ENG) (11)**	**10**
Rex Williams (ENG)	6
23 & 24 April
**Eddie Charlton (AUS) (6)**	**10**
Roy Andrewartha (WAL)	4
22 & 23 April
**Kirk Stevens (CAN) (7)**	**10**
Eddie Sinclair (SCO)	1
22 & 23 April
**David Taylor (ENG) (10)**	**10**
Marcel Gauvreau (CAN)	5
21 & 22 April
Tony Meo (ENG) (15)	5
**Silvino Francisco (RSA)**	**10**
21 April
**Ray Reardon (WAL) (2)**	**10**
Jim Wych (CAN)	7

**Second round** Best of 25 frames
26 & 27 April
**(England) Steve Davis (1)**	**13**
(England) John Spencer (16)	5
27 & 28 April
**(Wales) Terry Griffiths (9)**	**13**
(Canada) Bill Werbeniuk (8)	5
28, 29 & 30 April
(England) Neal Foulds	6
**(Wales) Doug Mountjoy (12)**	**13**
29 & 30 April
**(Northern Ireland) Dennis Taylor (13)**	**13**
(England) John Parrott	11
29 & 30 April
**(Canada) Cliff Thorburn (3)**	**13**
(England) Willie Thorne	11
28, 29 & 30 April
**(England) Jimmy White (11)**	**13**
(Australia) Eddie Charlton (6)	7
27 & 28 April
**(Canada) Kirk Stevens (7)**	**13**
(England) David Taylor (10)	10
26, 27 & 28 April
(South Africa) Silvino Francisco	8
**(Wales) Ray Reardon (2)**	**13**

**Quarter-finals**; Best of 25 frames
1 & 2 May
**(England) Steve Davis (1)**	**13**
(Wales) Terry Griffiths (9)	10
1 & 2 May
(Wales) Doug Mountjoy (12)	8
**(Northern Ireland) Dennis Taylor (13)**	**13**
1 & 2 May
(Canada) Cliff Thorburn (3)	8
**(England) Jimmy White (11)**	**13**
1 & 2 May
**(Canada) Kirk Stevens (7)**	**13**
(Wales) Ray Reardon (2)	2

**Semi-finals**; Best of 31 frames
3, 4 & 5 May
**(England) Steve Davis (1)**	**16**
(Northern Ireland) Dennis Taylor (13)	9
3, 4 & 5 May
**(England) Jimmy White (11)**	**16**
(Canada) Kirk Stevens (7)	14

**Final**; Best of 35 frames
6 & 7 May
**(England) Steve Davis (1)**	**18**
(England) Jimmy White (11)	16

**Final** (Best of 35 frames) Crucible Theatre, Sheffield, 6 & 7 May 1984. Referee: Jim Thorpe
**Steve Davis (1)**
England
**18**–16
Jimmy White (11)
England
**73**–14, **84**–24, **70**–65, 51–73, **69**–39, **110**–15, **77**–38, **68**–25, **81**–0, 0–137, **57**–40, 8–104, **120**–0, 43–67, **65**–61, **73**–22, 6–127, 29–62, 1–76, **68**–56, 42–65, 29–68, 4–80, 43–67, **64**–15, **82**–43, 19–91, **73**–40, 6–84, 22–72, 40–74, **59**–55, 60–65, **77**–40
Century breaks: 1 (White 1)

Highest break by Davis: 84
Highest break by White: 119

73–14, 84–24, 70–65, 51–**73**, 69–39, 110–15, 77–38, 68–25, 81–0, 0–**137**, 57–40, 8–**104**, 120–0, 43–**67**, 65–61, 73–22, 6–**127**, 29–**62**, 1–**76**, 68–56, 42–**65**, 29–**68**, 4–**80**, 43–**67**, 64–15, 82–43, 19–**91**, 73–40, 6–**84**, 22–**72**, 40–**74**, 59–55, 60–**65**, 77–40
**Steve Davis** wins the 1984 Embassy World Snooker Championship.

== Century breaks ==
There were eight century breaks in the championship, the fewest since the 1978 event. The highest break of the televised stages was 138 made by Rex Williams. The highest break in qualifying was a 112 made by Jim Donnelly.

- 138 – Rex Williams
- 119, 100 – Jimmy White
- 115, 101 – Kirk Stevens
- 109 – Ray Reardon
- 102 – Dennis Taylor
- 100 – Steve Davis

Qualifying

- 112 – Jim Donnelly
- 108, 108 – Tommy Murphy
- 106 – Gino Rigitano
- 104 – Mario Morra
- 102, 100 – Neal Foulds
- 101 – John Parrott
- 100 – Ian Williamson
