= Glen Wilkinson =

Australian snooker player

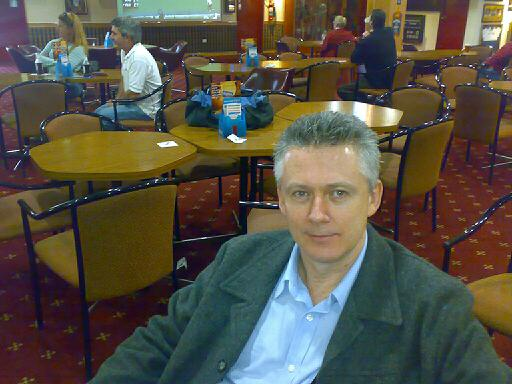

Personal information
- Born: 4 July 1959 (age 67) Australia

Sport
- Country: Australia
- Sport: Snooker
- Professional: 1985–1993
- Highest ranking: 91 (1989/1990)
- Best ranking finish: Last 64 (x4)

Glen Wilkinson (born 4 July 1959) is an Australian professional snooker player from Miranda, New South Wales who is currently ranked the number ten snooker player in Australia. He is also a National Director of Coaching for snooker in Australia.

== Career ==
In 1983 Wilkinson got the highest break (105) in the Australian Open Championship in Gosford, New South Wales and the following year he went on to win the Open in Perth, Western Australia at the age of 25, again having the highest break of the tournament with 101. A year later he turned professional and moved to England to compete, where he had moderate success reaching a world ranking of No. 91. Returning to Australia in 1990, he was runner-up in the Australian Open Championship in 1998 with the tournament now being held in Sydney each year.

His next tournament win came in 1999 when he won the Rooty Hill Masters, the World Professional Billiards and Snooker Association (WPBSA) South Pacific Snooker Championship and The New South Wales (NSW) Open Snooker Championship. In 2000 he successfully defended both his Rooty Hill Masters and The NSW Open Championship titles.

He won The NSW Open Championship again in 2001, 2002 and 2004. He reached the semi-finals of the Australian Open Championship in 2001 and 2004

However, between 2001 and 2004 it was the only title he won until 2005 when he won both the NSW Open Championship and also the Central Coast Leagues Club Classic, held in Gosford, New South Wales beating Joe Minici in the final. He was also runner-up in the Australian Open Championship, where he lost to Dene O'Kane of New Zealand in the final and runner-up to Steve Mifsud in the Princes Coca-Cola Cup. In the Kings Australia Cup he reached the semi-finals where he lost to eventual winner Neil Robertson.

In 2006 at the age of 47, he won the inaugural Australian Masters Championship, beating Paul Asher in the final. He was also runner-up in three tournaments – the International Billiards and Snooker Federation (IBSF) World Masters, the Central Coast Leagues Club Classic, where he lost to Neil Robertson. and the Fred Osbourne Memorial Snooker, losing to James Mifsud as well as reaching the semi-finals of the Australian Open Championship, where he lost to Dene O'Kane, the Princes Coca-Cola Cup where he lost to eventual winner Aaron Mahoney the Lance Pannell Snooker Classic where he lost to Steve Mifsud, the NSW Open Championship and the Oceania Snooker Championship. In the South Pacific Snooker Championship he reached the quarter-final stage before losing to eventual winner Paul Balzer.

In 2007 he had his most successful year to date, winning the Australian Open Championship, the Australian National Championship held at the RACV Club in Melbourne beating Shawn Budd in the final, the Australian Masters Championship, beating Nathan Webb in the final the Queensland Open, beating Steve Mifsud in the final. and the NSW Open Championship. He also reached the final of the Allied Metal Recyclers West Coast International where he lost to Neil Robertson. In the Central Coast Leagues Club Classic he reached the semi-finals. He also reached the semi-finals of the Lance Pannell Snooker Classic and the Princes Coca-Cola Cup He again reached the quarter-finals of the South Pacific Open Championship

In 2008 Wilkinson won the Oceania Championship beating Chris McBreen in the final. In the Kings Australia Cup he reached the semi-finals losing to Neil Robertson. He also reached the semi-finals of the Australian Masters Championship and the Lance Pannell Snooker Classic. He is currently ranked at number two in Australia behind Steve Mifsud.

Wilkinson is now one of two National Directors of Coaching along with Robby Foldvari, appointed by the Australian Billiards & Snooker Council.

== Performance and rankings timeline ==
Tournament	1985/ 86	1986/ 87	1987/ 88	1988/ 89	1989/ 90	1990/ 91	1991/ 92	1992/ 93	1995/ 96	2010/ 11
Ranking (Note: It shows the ranking at the beginning of the season)	(Note: New players on the Main Tour do not have a ranking)	102	96	95	91	108 (Note: Did not participate any tournament during the season)	135		(Note: He was an amateur)	
Ranking tournaments
World Open (Note: The event was called the Grand Prix (1985/1986-1992/1993 and 1995/1996))	LQ	LQ	1R	LQ	LQ	A	A	A	A	A
UK Championship	LQ	LQ	LQ	LQ	LQ	A	A	A	A	A
Players Tour Championship Grand Final	Tournament Not Held									DNQ
World Championship	LQ	A	LQ	LQ	LQ	A	A	A	A	A
Non-ranking tournaments
Six-red World Championship	Tournament Not Held									1R
Former ranking tournaments
Canadian Masters	Non-Ranking Event			LQ	Tournament Not Held					
Hong Kong Open (Note: The event was called the Australian Masters (1985/1986-1987/1988 and 1995/1996) and the Australian Open (1995/1996))	Non-Ranking Event			NH	LQ	Tournament Not Held			NR	NH
The Classic	LQ	LQ	LQ	1R	LQ	A	A	Tournament Not Held		
Thailand Classic (Note: The event was called the Dubai Masters (1988/1989) and the Dubai Classic (1989/1990-1992/1993))	Tournament Not Held			NR	LQ	A	A	A	A	NH
International Open (Note: The event was called the Matchroom Trophy (1985/1986))	LQ	LQ	LQ	LQ	LQ	Tournament Not Held		A	A	NH
European Open	Tournament Not Held			LQ	LQ	A	A	A	A	NH
Thailand Open (Note: The event was called the Thailand Masters (1985/1986-1986/1987 and 1991/1992) and the Asian Open (1989/1990-1992/1993))	Non-Ranking		Not Held		LQ	A	A	A	A	NH
British Open	LQ	1R	LQ	LQ	LQ	A	A	A	A	NH
Former non-ranking tournaments
Australian Professional Championship	QF	QF	QF	2R	Tournament Not Held					
Australian Open (Note: The event was called the Australian Masters (1985/1986-1987/1988 and 1995/1996) and the Hong Kong Open (1989/1990))	A	1R	1R	NH	R	Tournament Not Held			1R	NH

Performance Table Legend
LQ	lost in the qualifying draw	#R	lost in the early rounds of the tournament (WR = Wildcard round, RR = Round robin)	QF	lost in the quarter-finals
SF	lost in the semi-finals	F	lost in the final	W	won the tournament
DNQ	did not qualify for the tournament	A	did not participate in the tournament	WD	withdrew from the tournament

NH / Not Held	event was not held
NR / Non-Ranking Event	event is/was no longer a ranking event
R / Ranking Event	event is/was a ranking event
MR / Minor-Ranking Event	event is/was a minor-ranking event

== Tournament wins ==
=== Australia/World championships ===
- Australian Open Championship – 1984, 2007
- Australian Masters Championship – 2006, 2007
- Australian National Championship – 2007
- Oceania Championship – 2008, 2009

=== National ranking tournaments ===
- WPBSA South Pacific Snooker Championship – 1999
- Central Coast League Club Classic – 2005

=== State championships ===
- New South Wales Open Championship – 1999, 2000, 2001, 2002, 2004, 2005, 2007
- Queensland Open – 2007
- New South Wales Doubles Champion – 2007, 2008, 2009 (partner Alex Render)

=== Other tournaments ===
- Rooty Hill Masters – 1999, 2000
