= 1983 Australian Masters =

Australian Masters
Tournament information
- Dates: 4–15 July 1983
- Venue: Channel 10 Television Studios
- City: Sydney
- Country: Australia
- Organisation: WPBSA
- Format: Non-ranking event
- Total prize fund: $100,000 (Note: Including $10,000 for a maximum break, which was not awarded.)
- Winner's share: $20,000
- Highest break: Cliff Thorburn (CAN), 129

Final
- Champion: Cliff Thorburn (CAN)
- Runner-up: Bill Werbeniuk (CAN)
- Score: 7–3

The 1983 Winfield Australian Masters was a professional non-ranking snooker tournament that took place between 4–15 July 1983 at Channel 10 Television Studios in Sydney, Australia.

Cliff Thorburn won the tournament by defeating Bill Werbeniuk 7–3 in the final. He made the tournament's highest break, 129, in the semi-finals.

== Main draw ==
Round 1 Best of 5 Frames
(Canada) Cliff Thorburn	3
(Australia) Warren King	1
(England) Jimmy White	3
(Australia) Ian Anderson	2
(Canada) Kirk Stevens	3
(Wales) Doug Mountjoy	1
(Australia) Eddie Charlton	3
(Australia) Paddy Morgan	2
(Canada) Bill Werbeniuk	3
(Northern Ireland) Dennis Taylor	2
(Northern Ireland) Alex Higgins	3
(England) John Spencer	2
(England) Tony Knowles	3
(Australia) John Campbell	1
(England) Tony Meo	3
(England) David Taylor	0

Quarter-finals; Best of 7 Frames
(Canada) Cliff Thorburn	4
(England) Jimmy White	2
(Canada) Kirk Stevens	4
(Australia) Eddie Charlton	1
(Canada) Bill Werbeniuk	4
(Northern Ireland) Alex Higgins	0
(England) Tony Knowles	4
(England) Tony Meo	3

Semi-finals; Best of 9 Frames
(Canada) Cliff Thorburn	5
(Canada) Kirk Stevens	2
(Canada) Bill Werbeniuk	5
(England) Tony Knowles	0

Final; Best of 13 Frames
(Canada) Cliff Thorburn	7
(Canada) Bill Werbeniuk	3
