= 1984 Australian Masters =

Australian Masters
Tournament information
- Dates: 25 June – 8 July 1984
- City: Sydney
- Country: Australia
- Organisation: WPBSA
- Format: Non-ranking event
- Total prize fund: $100,000
- Winner's share: $22,000
- Highest break: John Virgo (ENG) (122)

Final
- Champion: (England) Tony Knowles
- Runner-up: (England) John Virgo
- Score: 7–3

The 1984 Winfield Australian Masters was a professional non-ranking snooker tournament took place between 25 June and 8 July 1984 in Sydney, Australia. The first round was held at the Parmatta Club, and the second round onwards was held at Channel 10 Studios, Epping, New South Wales.

Tony Knowles won the tournament by defeating John Virgo 7–3 in the final.

== Prize fund ==
The breakdown of prize money for this year is shown below:

- Winner: $22,000
- Runner-up: $12,000
- Semi-final: $7,000
- Quarter-final: $5,500
- Round 1: $3,500
- Highest break: $2,000
- Maximum break: $10,000
- Total: $100,000

== Main draw ==
Round 1 Best of 7 Frames
(England) Tony Knowles	4
(Northern Ireland) Dennis Taylor	2
(England) Jimmy White	4
(Australia) John Campbell	0
(Australia) Eddie Charlton	4
(Australia) Warren King	1
(England) David Taylor	4
(Australia) Ian Anderson	2
(England) John Virgo	4
(Wales) Doug Mountjoy	1
(England) Willie Thorne	4
(Canada) Cliff Thorburn	1
(England) Tony Meo	4
(Canada) Bill Werbeniuk	0
(Canada) Kirk Stevens	4
(Australia) Paddy Morgan	2

Quarter-finals; Best of 9 Frames
(England) Tony Knowles	5
(England) Jimmy White	3
(Australia) Eddie Charlton	5
(England) David Taylor	4
(England) John Virgo	5
(England) Willie Thorne	3
(England) Tony Meo	5
(Canada) Kirk Stevens	1

Semi-finals; Best of 11 Frames
(England) Tony Knowles	6
(Australia) Eddie Charlton	0
(England) John Virgo	6
(England) Tony Meo	2

Final; Best of 13 Frames
(England) Tony Knowles	7
(England) John Virgo	3
