= 1986 Grand Prix =

1986 Grand Prix may refer to:

- 1986 Grand Prix (snooker)
- 1986 Grand Prix (tennis)
