= Australian Professional Championship =

Australian Professional Snooker Championship
Tournament information
- Country: Australia
- Established: 1911
- Format: Non-ranking event
- Final year: 1988
- Final champion: (Australia) John Campbell

The Australian Professional Snooker Championship was a professional snooker tournament which was open only for Australian or Australian-based players.

== History ==
The Australian Professional Championship was not held between 1975 and 1984 when the WPBSA offered a subsidy of £1,000 per player to any country holding a national professional championship. This subsidy ended in 1988/1989 after which most national championships were discontinued.

The highest break ever made in the tournament was 130 by Warren King in 1985.

== Winners ==
Year	Winner	Runner-up	Final score	Venue	Season	Ref
1911	(England) Tom Reece	(Australia) Frank Smith Jnr	14–7	Alcock's Hall, Sydney		
1912	(Australia) Frank Smith Jnr	(Australia) Harry Power	36–11	Alcock's rooms, Sydney		
1963 (Oct)	(Australia) Warren Simpson	(Australia) Newton Gaham	5–3	Bankstown	1963/64	
1963 (Dec)	(Australia) Eddie Charlton	(Australia) Warren Simpson	46–45	Newcastle	1963/64	
1964	(Australia) Norman Squire	(Australia) Eddie Charlton	Round-robin	Sutherland	1964/65	
1965	(Australia) Eddie Charlton	(Australia) Warren Simpson	Round-robin	Newcastle	1965/66	
1966	(Australia) Eddie Charlton	(Australia) Warren Simpson	7–4	Harbord	1966/67	
1967	(Australia) Eddie Charlton	(Australia) Warren Simpson	7–1	Sydney	1967/68	
1968	(Australia) Warren Simpson	(Australia) Eddie Charlton	11–10	Sydney	1968/69	
1969	(Australia) Eddie Charlton	(Australia) Norman Squire	8–3	Sydney	1969/70	
1970	(Australia) Eddie Charlton	(Australia) Warren Simpson	Round-robin (Note: This was also a qualifying event for the 1971 World Snooker Championship)	Sydney	1970/71	
1971	(Australia) Eddie Charlton	(Australia) Warren Simpson	11–7	Sydney	1971/72	
1972	(Australia) Eddie Charlton	(Wales) Gary Owen	19–10	Sydney	1972/73	
1973	(Australia) Eddie Charlton	(Wales) Gary Owen	31–10	Wagga Wagga	1973/74	
1974	(Australia) Eddie Charlton	(Australia) Warren Simpson	44–17	Wagga Wagga	1974/75	
1975	(Australia) Eddie Charlton	(Australia) Dennis Wheelwright	31–10	Wagga Wagga	1975/76	
1976	(Australia) Eddie Charlton	(Australia) Paddy Morgan	Walkover	Melbourne	1976/77	
1977	(Australia) Eddie Charlton	(Australia) Paddy Morgan	25–21	Melbourne	1977/78	
1978	(Australia) Eddie Charlton	(Australia) Ian Anderson	29–13	Grafton	1978/79	
1984	(Australia) Eddie Charlton	(Australia) Warren King	10–3	Dubbo	1984/85	
1985	(Australia) John Campbell	(Australia) Eddie Charlton	10–7	Sydney	1985/86	
1986	(Australia) Warren King	(Australia) John Campbell	10–3	Wollongong	1986/87	
1987	(Australia) Warren King	(Australia) Eddie Charlton	10–7	Sydney	1987/88	
1988	(Australia) John Campbell	(Australia) Robby Foldvari	9–7	Sydney	1988/89	

== See also ==
- Cue sports in Australia
