= 1978 Australian Professional Championship =

Australian Professional Championship
Tournament information
- Dates: 4–15 December 1978
- Venue: Grafton Services Club
- City: Grafton
- Country: Australia
- Organisation: WPBSA
- Format: Non-ranking event
- Highest break: Eddie Charlton (138)

Final
- Champion: Eddie Charlton
- Runner-up: Ian Anderson
- Score: 29–13

The 1978 Australian Professional Championship was a professional non-ranking snooker tournament, which took place between 4 and 15 December 1978 at the Grafton Services Club in Grafton, Australia.

Eddie Charlton won the tournament defeating Ian Anderson 29–13 in the final.

== Results ==
=== Group A ===
POS	Player	MP	MW	FW	FL	FD
1	Eddie Charlton	3	3	24	2	+22
2	Warren Simpson	3	2	16	16	–
3	Dennis Wheelwright	3	1	11	22	-11
4	Jim Charlton	3	0	13	24	-11

- Eddie Charlton 8–1 Dennis Wheelwright
- Eddie Charlton 8–1 Jim Charlton
- Warren Simpson 8–2 Dennis Wheelwright
- Eddie Charlton 8–0 Warren Simpson
- Warren Simpson 8–6 Jim Charlton
- Dennis Wheelwright 8–6 Jim Charlton

=== Group B ===
POS	Player	MP	MW	FW	FL	FD
1	Ian Anderson	3	3	24	14	+10
2	Paddy Morgan	3	2	22	13	+9
3	Philip Tarrant	3	1	13	22	-9
4	Lou Condo	3	0	14	24	-10

- Ian Anderson 8–6 Paddy Morgan
- Ian Anderson 8–2 Philip Tarrant
- Philip Tarrant 8–6 Lou Condo
- Ian Anderson 8–6 Lou Condo
- Paddy Morgan 8–2 Lou Condo
- Paddy Morgan 8–3 Philip Tarrant

=== Final ===
- Eddie Charlton 29–13 Ian Anderson
