= 1966–67 snooker season =

Details
- Duration: July 1966 – June 1967
- Tournaments: 2 (non-ranking)

The 1966–67 snooker season was the series of professional snooker tournaments played between July 1966 and June 1967. The following table outlines the results for the season's events.

== New professional player ==
John Spencer turned professional, becoming the first new professional since Rex Williams in 1951.

== Calendar ==
Date (Note: Dates use the mm-dd date format.)			Rank	Tournament name	Venue	City	Winner	Runner-up	Score	Ref.
07-??	07-??	AUS	NR	Australian Professional Championship		Harbord	Eddie Charlton (AUS)	Warren Simpson (AUS)	7–4	
11-??	04-??	ENG	NR	World Open Snooker Championship	Various venues, UK		Rex Williams (ENG)	Fred Davis (ENG)	26–25 (Note: Matches)	
