= Warren King (snooker player) =

Australian snooker player

Personal information
- Born: 1 April 1955 (age 71) Sydney

Sport
- Country: Australia
- Sport: Snooker
- Professional: 1982–1995
- Highest ranking: 35 (1985/1986)
- Best ranking finish: Runner-up (x1)

Warren King (born 1 April 1955) is a former professional Australian snooker player who was active during the 1980s and 1990s. He reached his highest ranking position, 35th, for the 1985/1986 season, and was the runner-up in the 1990 Classic, where he lost 6–10 to Steve James.

In 1994 King made the first 147 break in a tournament in Australia and in doing so became the first Australian to make a 147 break in a tournament.

== Life and career ==
King lived in Granville, New South Wales during his childhood. He was the Australian amateur snooker champion in 1980 and 1981. He turned professional in 1982. In the 1983/1984 season, he qualified for the semi-final group in the 1984 International Masters, recording a 2–1 victory over Alex Higgins in his qualifying group. In the 1984 World Championship, he defeated Tony Jones 10–9, Mike Watterson 10–8 and Dave Martin 10–8 to qualify for the televised stages at the Crucible Theatre; there, he was drawn against incumbent World Champion Steve Davis, but having held Davis to 2–2, he could not prevent a 3–10 loss.

During the next season, King reached the final of the 1984 Australian Professional Championship, where he also lost 3–10, this time to Eddie Charlton, and followed this with a last-32 finish in the 1984 UK Championship, losing 5–9 to Dennis Taylor. In the 1985 Classic, he overcame Steve Duggan, Dean Reynolds, John Spencer and Jimmy White to reach the quarter-finals, losing there 1–5 to Joe Johnson.

Ranked 35th for the 1985/1986 season, King began it with another last-32 finish in the 1985 Matchroom Trophy, but had a quiet season thereafter; he came within one match of returning to the Crucible after beating Dessie Sheehan and Colin Roscoe in World Championship qualifying, but lost in the final round 7–10 to Reynolds.

In the 1986 Australian Professional Championship, King defeated Charlton in the semi-finals and John Campbell 10–3 in the final to record his first tournament win. After a solid season, he qualified for the 1987 World Championship, defeating David Roe, Ken Owers and Charlton all 10–4, but was again drawn to face Steve Davis. On this occasion, Davis raced into a 7–1 lead before King fought back to 8–7, but again Davis prevailed, 10–7.

King recorded his second tournament win in the 1987 Australian Professional Championship; Charlton was again his opponent in the final, and this time King won 10–7. He otherwise performed poorly in the ranking events, but qualified for a third time for the World Championship, notably overcoming Spencer in the final round. His opponent in the last 32 was rising star John Parrott, who beat him 10–4.

A lean period ensued, but in the 1990 Classic, King produced his best form. Entering at the last-96 stage, he defeated Mario Morra 5–3, Terry Griffiths 5–1, Charlton 5–2, John Virgo 5–1, Steve Newbury 5–3 and Silvino Francisco 6–5 – having trailed 3–5 – to reach a ranking event final for the first time in his career. His opponent in the final was Steve James and the match closely run; having at various points led 4–1, 5–2 and 7–6, James pulled away to win 10–6. This performance earned King £36,000, and ensured he finished the season – having started it ranked 55th and in some danger – in a much more secure position, at 39th.

The 1990/1991 season finished on a positive note for King, as he qualified for the Crucible for the fourth time, straightforward wins over Jack Fitzmaurice, Rod Lawler and Barry West sealing his passage to the televised stage; however, he was drawn against a former or future World Champion for the fourth time – on this occasion, Stephen Hendry. King fared no better than in previous years, losing 4–10.

In 1991, the professional game was 'opened' to anybody who could pay a small fee; now in competition against several hundred more players on the main tour, King began to fade, his only last-32 result coming in the Dubai Classic, where Francisco's nephew Peter beat him 5–4. Losing his first match in qualifying for the World Championship 9–10 to Andrew Cairns, he finished the season ranked 67th.

In 1994, playing in the New South Wales Open Snooker Championship, King became the first Australian ever to make a maximum break in a tournament, which was also the first maximum break ever recorded in a tournament in Australia. King won a car for the break, and went on to win the tournament.

By the 1994/1995 season, King's ranking had fallen even further, to 114th. He played in only one tournament, the 1995 World Championship, but his career concluded with Tai Pichit whitewashing him 10–0. King did not play on the main tour again, deciding to focus more on a career in pool.

== After snooker ==
King is Vice President of the Billiards and Snooker Association of South Australia.

== Performance and rankings timeline ==
Tournament	1982/ 83	1983/ 84	1984/ 85	1985/ 86	1986/ 87	1987/ 88	1988/ 89	1989/ 90	1990/ 91	1991/ 92	1992/ 93	1993/ 94	1994/ 95
Ranking	(Note: He was an amateur.)	(Note: New players on the Main Tour do not have a ranking.)	48	35	41	39	44	55	39	39	67	70	114
Ranking tournaments
Dubai Classic	Tournament Not Held						NR	2R	1R	2R	1R	LQ	A
Grand Prix (Note: The event was also called the Professional Players Tournament (1982/1983–1983/1984))	A	1R	1R	LQ	2R	LQ	LQ	2R	LQ	2R	LQ	LQ	A
UK Championship	A	A	1R	1R	1R	1R	1R	1R	1R	1R	LQ	LQ	A
European Open	Tournament Not Held						1R	LQ	LQ	1R	LQ	LQ	A
Welsh Open	Tournament Not Held									1R	LQ	WD	A
International Open (Note: The event was also called the Matchroom Trophy (1985/1986))	A	LQ	LQ	2R	2R	1R	1R	1R	Not Held		LQ	LQ	A
Thailand Open (Note: The event was also called the Thailand Masters (1983/1984–1986/1987) and the Asian Open (1989/1990–1992/1993))	NH	Non-Ranking Event				Not Held		2R	1R	LQ	LQ	LQ	A
British Open (Note: The event was also called the International Masters (1981/1982–1983/1984))	Non-Ranking		1R	LQ	2R	LQ	LQ	LQ	2R	LQ	2R	LQ	A
World Championship	LQ	1R	LQ	LQ	1R	1R	LQ	LQ	1R	LQ	LQ	LQ	LQ
Non-ranking tournaments
Australian Open (Note: The event was also called the Australian Masters (1982/1983–1987/1988) and the Hong Kong Open (1989/1990))	A	1R	1R	1R	1R	1R	NH	R	Tournament Not Held				QF
Benson and Hedges Championship	Tournament Not Held								A	4R	A	A	A
The Masters	A	A	A	A	A	A	A	A	A	LQ	A	A	A
Former ranking tournaments
Canadian Masters	Not Held			Non-Ranking			2R	Tournament Not Held					
Australian Open (Note: The event was also called the Australian Masters (1982/1983–1987/1988) and the Hong Kong Open (1989/1990))	Non-Ranking Event						NH	1R	Tournament Not Held				NR
Classic	NR	LQ	QF	1R	1R	LQ	1R	F	1R	1R	Not Held		
Strachan Open	Tournament Not Held									LQ	MR	NR	NH
Former non-ranking tournaments
British Open (Note: The event was also called the International Masters (1981/1982–1983/1984))	A	2R	Ranking Event										
Costa Del Sol Classic	Not Held		1R	Tournament Not Held									
New Zealand Masters	NH	A	A	Not Held			QF	A	Tournament Not Held				
Australian Professional Championship	Not Held		F	SF	W	W	SF	Tournament Not Held					
Shoot-Out	Tournament Not Held								1R	Tournament Not Held			
World Masters	Tournament Not Held									1R	Not Held		

Performance Table Legend
LQ	lost in the qualifying draw	#R	lost in the early rounds of the tournament (WR = Wildcard round, RR = Round robin)	QF	lost in the quarter-finals
SF	lost in the semi-finals	F	lost in the final	W	won the tournament
DNQ	did not qualify for the tournament	A	did not participate in the tournament	WD	withdrew from the tournament

NH / Not Held	means an event was not held.
NR / Non-Ranking Event	means an event is/was no longer a ranking event.
R / Ranking Event	means an event is/was a ranking event.

== Career finals ==
=== Ranking finals: 1 ===
Outcome	No.	Year	Championship	Opponent in the final	Score
Runner-up	1.	1990	The Classic	(England) Steve James	6–10

=== Non-ranking finals: 3 (2 titles) ===
Outcome	No.	Year	Championship	Opponent in the final	Score
Runner-up	1.	1984	Australian Professional Championship	(Australia) Eddie Charlton	3–10
Winner	1.	1986	Australian Professional Championship	(Australia) John Campbell	10–6
Winner	2.	1987	Australian Professional Championship (2)	(Australia) Eddie Charlton	10–7

=== Amateur finals: 3 (2 titles) ===
Outcome	No.	Year	Championship	Opponent in the final	Score
Winner	1.	1980	Australian Amateur Championship	(Australia) James Giannaros	4–2
Winner	2.	1981	Australian Amateur Championship (2)	(Australia) John Campbell	8–6
Runner-up	1.	1982	Australian Amateur Championship	(Australia) James Giannaros	3–8
