= Leon Heywood =

Australian snooker player

Personal information
- Born: 26 May 1952
- Died: 2014

Sport
- Country: Australia
- Sport: Snooker
- Professional: 1983–1988
- Highest ranking: 77

Leon Heywood (26 May 1952 – 2014) was an Australian professional snooker player.

== Career ==
Heywood grew up in Adelaide, and was runner-up to Ron Atkins in the Australian National Snooker Championships in 1976. Both players represented Australia at the 1976 IBSF World Snooker Championship, where Heywood won only one of his seven group matches.

In a 1979 match against Graham Miles, Heywood became the first Australian amateur player to make a maximum break.

Heywood was accepted as a professional by the World Professional Billiards and Snooker Association (WPBSA) in 1983. His application was originally rejected as his letter of recommendation from the Australian snooker association had been separated from hos application form; once this was realised, the decision was overturned.

He played ten matches as a professional, but did not win any of them. His first match was a 7–10 defeat by George Scott in the first qualifying round of the 1984 World Snooker Championship, and his last match ended in a 4–6 defeat by Ian Anderson at the 1987 Australian Professional Championship. The highest ranking that he achieved was 80th. Heywood died in 2014.
