= Mike Hines (snooker player) =

South African snooker player

Personal information
- Born: 21 March 1945 (age 81) Cape Town, South Africa

Sport
- Country: South Africa
- Sport: Snooker
- Professional: 1983–1990
- Highest ranking: 81

Mike Hines (born 21 March 1945) is a South African former professional snooker player.

== Career ==
Hines lost 0-7 to Silvino Francisco in the final of the 1974 South African Amateur Snooker Championship, and both players were due to represent South Africa at the 1974 IBSF World Snooker Championship in Ireland. However, following pressure from the Irish Government and the Irish Anti-Apartheid Movement and threats from India and Sri Lanka to boycott the tournament, the Republic of Ireland Billiards Control Council banned the South African players from the event.

Hines was accepted as a professional by the World Professional Billiards and Snooker Association (WPBSA) in 1983. His first professional tournament was the 1984 World Snooker Championship, where he defeated Ian Black 10-5 before losing 6–10 to Ian Williamson in the second qualifying round. At the 1985 World Snooker Championship, he eliminated Tony Chappel 10-8 and Paul Watchorn 10-4 before being knocked out 7–10 by Matt Gibson in the third qualifying round. His performance at the 1985 tournament was the furthest he ever progressed in the World Snooker Championship, with his only other appearance being in 1989 when he was defeated 1–10 by Robert Marshall.

He was a "non-tournament" member of the WPBSA for the 1989–90 snooker season, and did not play professionally again. The highest ranking that he achieved was 81st.
