= James Giannaros =

Australian snooker player

Personal information
- Born: 25 July 1952 (age 74)

Sport
- Country: Australia
- Sport: Snooker
- Professional: 1983–1995
- Highest ranking: 78

James Giannaros (born 25 July 1952) is an Australian former professional snooker player.

== Career ==
Giannaros played at the 1980 IBSF World Snooker Championship, winning all six of his group matches, before being eliminated 3-5 by Ron Atkins in the quarter-finals. At the 1982 tournament, he won five of his eight group matches, which was not enough to progress. He was the Australian Amateur Snooker champion in 1982.

He was accepted as a professional by the World Professional Billiards and Snooker Association (WPBSA) in 1983. His only professional match in the 1983–84 snooker season was in the qualifying competition for the 1984 World Snooker Championship, where he lost 1–10 to Les Dodd. The following season, he defeated Tony Chappel 5–2 at the 1985 Classic but lost 3–5 in the next qualifying round to Marcel Gauvreau; and recorded a 6–1 win over Colin Roscoe at the 1985 British Open before losing 3–6 to Dean Reynolds in the second qualifying round. The 1985 World Snooker Championship saw him eliminated 1–10 by Steve Longworth. He did not compete on the professional circuit in the 1985–86 snooker season.

After failing to win a match in the following two seasons, Giannaros was a "non-tournament" member of the WPBSA for the 1989–90 snooker season, and apart from one match at the 1994 Australian Open, did not play professionally again. The highest ranking that he achieved had been 78th.
