= John Campbell (snooker player) =

Australian snooker player

Personal information
- Born: 10 April 1953 (age 73) Brisbane

Sport
- Country: Australia
- Sport: Snooker
- Professional: 1982–1993
- Highest ranking: 18 (1986/1987)
- Best ranking finish: Quarter-final (x1)

John Campbell (born 10 April 1953) is a former Australian professional snooker player. During a career which lasted from 1982 to 1993, he was a quarter-finalist in the 1983 Professional Players Tournament, and won the Australian Professional Championship in 1985 and 1988.

== Career ==
Campbell was born on 10 April 1953 in Brisbane, and turned professional as a snooker player in 1982. Playing in only one tournament during the 1982/1983 season - the 1983 World Championship, he defeated Mike Watterson 10–6 in the first qualifying round and Jim Donnelly 10–2 in the second, to reach the main stages at the Crucible Theatre. There, he was drawn against former World Champion Cliff Thorburn but lost 5–10.

Beginning the 1983–84 snooker season with a world ranking of 39th, Campbell played in five events. At the 1983 Professional Players Tournament, where he overcame Doug Mountjoy, Graham Miles and Dave Martin to reach the quarter-finals. In his quarter-final match against Tony Knowles, he was defeated 3–5. In his attempt to qualify again for the World Championship, he lost 7–10 to Thorburn's compatriot Marcel Gauvreau.

In the 1984–85 season heralded better form still, Campbell reached the last-32 stage of four tournaments and made his second appearance at the Crucible; in the latter tournament, he defeated another Canadian, Mario Morra, 10–9, before being eliminated 3–10 by his fellow Australian Eddie Charlton.

Campbell defeated Charlton, who had held the title since 1968, in the final of the 1985 Australian Professional Championship, and during 1985/1986 recorded progress to the last-16 at four events. At the 1986 World Snooker Championship, where he eliminated Jimmy van Rensberg in qualifying, following this with a 10–8 victory over six-time World Champion Ray Reardon in the first round; however, in the next, Willie Thorne beat him 9–13.

He reached the final of the 1986 Australian Professional Championship, but lost 3–10 to Warren King, and won the event for the second time in 1988, overcoming Robby Foldvari 9–7. He reached the last 16 at the 1990 Asian Open, losing 4–5 to Mark Bennett. Following a 3–10 loss to John Giles in qualifying for the 1993 World Championship, he did not play competitive snooker after the 1992–93 season.
