= Robby Foldvari =

Australian cue sports player (born 1960)

Personal information
- Born: 2 June 1960 (age 66) Melbourne, Victoria, Australia

Sport
- Country: Australia
- Sport: Snooker
- Professional: 1984–1997
- Highest ranking: 62 (1985/1986)
- Best ranking finish: Last 16 (×1)

Robby Foldvari (born 2 June 1960) is an Australian professional player of snooker, English billiards, and pool. He is a multi-year World Billiards Champion (1986, 1997, 1998), and a national-level champion in both snooker (2006, 2008) and nine-ball pool (2012), as well as a World Games competitor (2013). Outside of competition, he is a coach and television commentator. Foldvari won the Australian Open 8 Ball Pool Championship (2015) (Oceania Pocket Billiard Federation), completing the royal flush of national titles in every cuesports discipline. In June 2016 he won the Australian Open 10 ball Pool Championship

== Career ==
He started his professional career in 1984, and became the World Billiards Champion in 1986. He won the World Matchplay Billiards Championship in 1997, and IBSF World Billiards Championship in 1998.

In 1991 he became the first non-British player to win the UK Billiards Championship, and won it again in 1992.

Foldvari captained the Australian World Cup Snooker Team to the quarter finals in Bangkok in 1996.

Foldvari won his only professional snooker title at the 1989 WPBSA Invitational Event One where he beat Darren Morgan 8–1 in the final.

Foldvari won the Australian Nine-ball Pool Championship in 2012 and the Australian Open Nine-ball Pool Championship in 2012.

He competed in the Nine-ball pool event at the 2013 World Games in Colombia.

Foldvari coaches many players, and performs television commentary.

=== Non-ranking wins: (1) ===
- WPBSA Invitational Event 1 - 1989

== Personal life ==
Robby Foldvari has a bachelor of economics degree from Monash University.,
