= Ian Anderson (snooker player) =

Australian snooker player (born 1946)

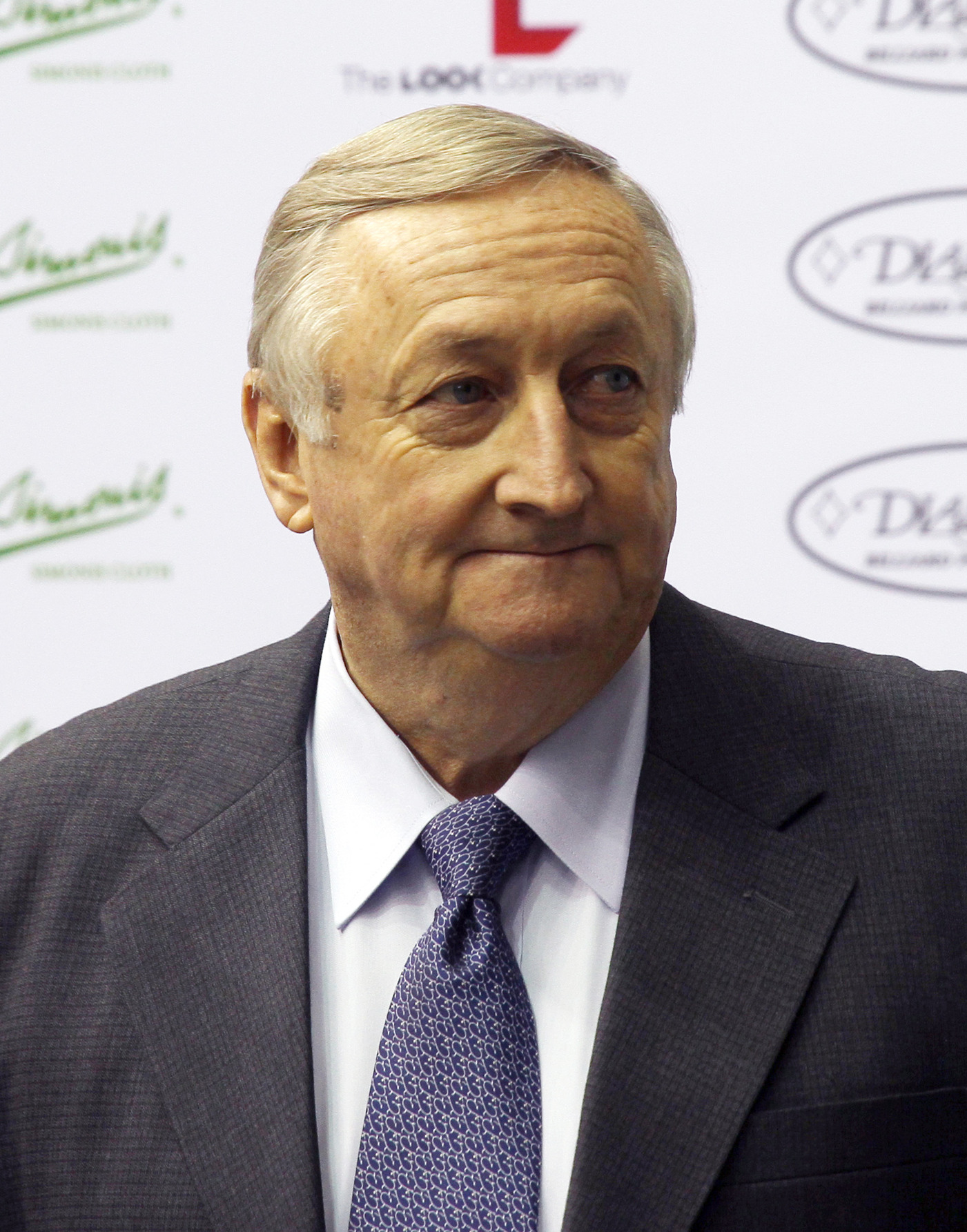
- Anderson at the World 9-Ball Pool Championship in Doha in 2012

Personal information
- Born: 2 April 1946 (age 80) Melbourne, Australia

Sport
- Country: Australia
- Sport: Snooker
- Professional: 1973–1992
- Highest ranking: 19 (1976–1977)
- Best ranking finish: Last 16 (x1)

Ian Anderson (born 2 April 1946) is an Australian former professional snooker player. He is the former president of the World Pool-Billiard Association.

== Career ==
Anderson turned professional in 1973, playing his first World Championship match against Perrie Mans of South Africa in 1974; Anderson held Mans to 1–1, but Mans pulled away to win 8–1.

The following year, he was eliminated 4–15 in the last 16 by Rex Williams, and in 1976, he lost 5–8 to Jackie Rea. In the 1979 tournament, Anderson was defeated in qualifying by Steve Davis, by 9 frames to 1, but in the 1982 Australian Masters, the group stage being in one-frame shoot-out format, he defeated Ray Reardon 70–48 and incumbent World Champion Alex Higgins 70–50 before losing 115–119 over two frames to Davis in the semi-final.

In 1979 he won the Australian Masters, his sole professional win as a snooker player. His other professional final came the year before in 1978, when he was defeated 29–13 by Eddie Charlton in the Australian Professional Championship.

Anderson reached the last 64 of the 1986 Grand Prix, where he lost 4–5 to Cliff Wilson having led Wilson 4–2, but his activities remained largely restricted to the Australian events, and he lost his place on the professional tour in 1992, aged 46 and with a world ranking of 147th.

== Career finals ==
=== Non-ranking finals: 2 (1 title) ===
Outcome	No.	Year	Championship	Opponent in the final	Score
Runner-up	1.	1978	Australian Professional Championship	(Australia) Eddie Charlton	13–29
Winner	1.	1979	Australian Masters	(South Africa) Perrie Mans	Aggregate Score (Note: The final was decided on an aggregate score over three frames.)
