= 1986–87 snooker season =

Details
- Duration: 30 June 1986 – 30 May 1987
- Tournaments: 29 (6 ranking events)

Triple Crown winners
- UK Championship: (England) Steve Davis
- Masters: (Northern Ireland) Dennis Taylor
- World Championship: (England) Steve Davis

The 1986–87 snooker season was a series of snooker tournaments played between 30 June 1986 and 30 May 1987. The following table outlines the results for the ranking and invitational events.

== Calendar ==
Date (Note: Dates use the mm-dd date format.)			Rank	Tournament name	Venue	City	Winner	Runner-up	Score	Reference
06–30	07–04	AUS	NR	Australian Masters	Parmatta Club	Sydney	(Northern Ireland) Dennis Taylor	(England) Steve Davis	3–2	
07–28	08–03	CAN	NR	Canadian Professional Championship	Snooker Centre	Toronto	(Canada) Cliff Thorburn	(Canada) Jim Wych	6–2	
08-??	08-??	RSA	NR	South African Professional Championship	Summit Club	Johannesburg	(South Africa) Silvino Francisco	(South Africa) Francois Ellis	9–1	
08–14	08–22	AUS	NR	Australian Professional Championship	WIN (TV station)	Sydney	(Australia) Warren King	(Australia) John Campbell	10–3	
08-??	08-??	THA	NR	Thailand Masters	Chiang Mai Plaza Hotel	Bangkok	(Thailand) James Wattana	(Wales) Terry Griffiths	2–1	
08–28	08–30	MYS	NR	Malaysian Masters	Putra World Trade Centre	Kuala Lumpur	(England) Jimmy White	(Northern Ireland) Dennis Taylor	2–1	
09–02	09–07	HKG	NR	Hong Kong Masters	Queen Elizabeth Stadium	Hong Kong	(England) Willie Thorne	(Northern Ireland) Dennis Taylor	8–3	
09-??	09-??	CHN	NR	China Masters		Shanghai	(England) Steve Davis	(Wales) Terry Griffiths	3–0	
09–15	09–17	IRL	NR	Carlsberg Challenge	RTÉ Studios	Dublin	(Northern Ireland) Dennis Taylor	(England) Jimmy White	8–3	
09–17	09–21	ENG	NR	Matchroom Professional Championship	Cliffs Pavilion	Southend-on-Sea	(England) Willie Thorne	(England) Steve Davis	10–9	
09–18	09–21	SCO	NR	Scottish Masters	Hospitality Inn	Glasgow	(Canada) Cliff Thorburn	(Northern Ireland) Alex Higgins	9–8	
09–26	10–05	ENG	WR	International Open	Trentham Gardens	Stoke-on-Trent	(England) Neal Foulds	(Canada) Cliff Thorburn	12–9	
10–18	10-26	ENG	WR	Grand Prix	Hexagon Theatre	Reading	(England) Jimmy White	(England) Rex Williams	10–6	
10-28	11–01	CAN	NR	Canadian Masters	CBC Television Studios	Toronto	(England) Steve Davis	(England) Willie Thorne	9–3	
11–22	11–30	ENG	WR	UK Championship	Guild Hall	Preston	(England) Steve Davis	(England) Neal Foulds	16–7	
12–02	12–14	ENG	TE	World Doubles Championship	Derngate Centre	Northampton	(England) Steve Davis (England) Tony Meo	(England) Mike Hallett (Scotland) Stephen Hendry	12–3	
01–02	01–11	ENG	WR	The Classic	Norbreck Castle Hotel	Blackpool	(England) Steve Davis	(England) Jimmy White	13–12	
01–25	02–01	ENG	NR	The Masters	Wembley Conference Centre	London	(Northern Ireland) Dennis Taylor	(Northern Ireland) Alex Higgins	9–8	
02–03	02–08	SCO	NR	Scottish Professional Championship	Steve Davis Club	Glasgow	(Scotland) Stephen Hendry	(Scotland) Jim Donnelly	10–7	
02–06	02–11	ENG	NR	English Professional Championship	Corn Exchange	Ipswich	(England) Tony Meo	(England) Les Dodd	9–5	
02–09	02–13	WAL	NR	Welsh Professional Championship	Newport Centre	Newport	(Wales) Doug Mountjoy	(Wales) Steve Newbury	9–7	
02–15	03–01	ENG	WR	British Open	Assembly Rooms	Derby	(England) Jimmy White	(England) Neal Foulds	13–9	
03–05	03–08	CHN	NR	Kent Cup	Beijing Indoor Stadium	Beijing	(England) Willie Thorne	(England) Jimmy White	5–2	
03–18	03–21	ENG	TE	World Cup	Bournemouth International Centre	Bournemouth	All Ireland A	Canada	9–2	
03–24	03–29	IRL	NR	Irish Masters	Goffs Complex	Kildare	(England) Steve Davis	(England) Willie Thorne	9–1	
04–18	05–04	ENG	WR	World Snooker Championship	Crucible Theatre	Sheffield	(England) Steve Davis	(England) Joe Johnson	18–14	
05–09	05–16	WAL	NR	Pontins Professional	Pontins	Prestatyn	(England) Neal Foulds	(England) Willie Thorne	9–8	
01–17	05–17	ENG	NR	Matchroom League			(England) Steve Davis	(England) Neal Foulds	(Note: No play-off was held and the title was decided on league table only.)	
05–27	05–30	NIR	NR	Irish Professional Championship	Antrim Forum	Antrim	(Northern Ireland) Dennis Taylor	(Republic of Ireland) Joe O'Boye	9–2	

WR = World ranking event
NR = Non-ranking event
TE = Team event

== Official rankings ==
The top 16 of the world rankings, these players automatically played in the final rounds of the world ranking events and were invited for the Masters.

No.	Ch.	Name
1	Steady	(England) Steve Davis
2	Steady	(Canada) Cliff Thorburn
3	▲	(Northern Ireland) Dennis Taylor
4	▼	(England) Tony Knowles
5	▲	(England) Jimmy White
6	▲	(Northern Ireland) Alex Higgins
7	▲	(England) Willie Thorne
8	▲	(England) Joe Johnson
9	▼	(Canada) Kirk Stevens
10	▼	(Wales) Terry Griffiths
11	▼	(England) Tony Meo
12	▲	(South Africa) Silvino Francisco
13	▲	(England) Neal Foulds
14	▲	(Wales) Doug Mountjoy
15	▼	(Wales) Ray Reardon
16	▲	(England) Rex Williams
