= 1988–89 snooker season =

Details
- Duration: July 1988 – May 1989
- Tournaments: 29 (8 ranking events)

Triple Crown winners
- UK Championship: (Wales) Doug Mountjoy
- Masters: (Scotland) Stephen Hendry
- World Championship: (England) Steve Davis

The 1988–89 snooker season was a series of snooker tournaments played between July 1988 and May 1989. The following table outlines the results for the ranking and invitational events.

== Calendar ==
Date (Note: Dates use the mm-dd date format.)			Rank	Tournament name	Venue	City	Winner	Runner-up	Score	Reference
05–22	05–26	NZL	NR	New Zealand Masters	New Zealand Parliament	Wellington	(Scotland) Stephen Hendry	(England) Mike Hallett	6–1	
07–18	07–24	AUS	NR	Australian Professional Championship	Roots Hill Retired Soldiers Club	Sydney	(Australia) John Campbell	(Australia) Robby Foldvari	9–7	
08–03	08–07	HKG	NR	Hong Kong Masters	Queen Elizabeth Stadium	Hong Kong	(England) Jimmy White	(England) Neal Foulds	6–3	
08–25	09–11	ENG	WR	International Open	Trentham Gardens	Stoke-on-Trent	(England) Steve Davis	(England) Jimmy White	12–6	
09-??	09-??	CAN	NR	Canadian Professional Championship	Minkler Auditorium	Toronto	(Canada) Alain Robidoux	(Canada) Jim Wych	8–4	
09-26	09-29	UAE	NR	Dubai Masters	Al Nasr Stadium	Dubai	(England) Neal Foulds	(England) Steve Davis	5–4	
10–03	10–05	IRL	NR	Fosters Professional	RTÉ Studios	Dublin	(England) Mike Hallett	(Scotland) Stephen Hendry	8–5	
10–04	10–09	ENG	NR	Matchroom Professional Championship	Cliffs Pavilion	Southend-on-Sea	(England) Steve Davis	(Northern Ireland) Dennis Taylor	10–7	
10-10	10–23	ENG	WR	Grand Prix	Hexagon Theatre	Reading	(England) Steve Davis	(Northern Ireland) Alex Higgins	10–6	
10–26	11–05	CAN	WR	Canadian Masters	Minkler Auditorium	Toronto	(England) Jimmy White	(England) Steve Davis	9–4	
11-11	11–27	ENG	WR	UK Championship	Guild Hall	Preston	(Wales) Doug Mountjoy	(Scotland) Stephen Hendry	16–12	
12–02	12–10	ENG	NR	World Matchplay	Brentwood Centre	Brentwood	(England) Steve Davis	(England) John Parrott	9–5	
09–17	12–18	EUR	NR	Norwich Union Grand Prix			(England) Steve Davis	(England) Jimmy White	5–4	
01-01	01–15	ENG	WR	The Classic	Norbreck Castle Hotel	Blackpool	(Wales) Doug Mountjoy	(Wales) Wayne Jones	13–11	
01-??	01-??	RSA	NR	South African Professional Championship		Johannesburg	(South Africa) Perrie Mans	(South Africa) Robbie Grace	8–5	
01–22	01–29	ENG	NR	The Masters	Wembley Conference Centre	London	(Scotland) Stephen Hendry	(England) John Parrott	9–6	
01–30	02–11	FRA	WR	European Open	Casino de Deauville	Deauville	(England) John Parrott	(Wales) Terry Griffiths	9–8	
02–14	02–17	NIR	NR	Irish Professional Championship	Antrim Forum	Antrim	(Northern Ireland) Alex Higgins	(Northern Ireland) Jack McLaughlin	9–7	
02–12	02–18	ENG	NR	English Professional Championship	Redwood Lodge	Bristol	(England) Mike Hallett	(England) John Parrott	9–7	
02–13	02–18	WAL	NR	Welsh Professional Championship	Newport Centre	Newport	(Wales) Doug Mountjoy	(Wales) Terry Griffiths	9–6	
02–01	02–19	SCO	NR	Scottish Professional Championship	Marco's Leisure Centre	Edinburgh	(Scotland) John Rea	(Scotland) Murdo MacLeod	9–7	
02–19	03–05	ENG	WR	British Open	Assembly Rooms	Derby	(England) Tony Meo	(England) Dean Reynolds	13–6	
03–21	03–24	ENG	TE	World Cup	Bournemouth International Centre	Bournemouth	England	Rest of the World	9–8	
03–28	04–02	IRL	NR	Irish Masters	Goff's	Kill	(Northern Ireland) Alex Higgins	(Scotland) Stephen Hendry	9–8	
04–20	04–23	CHN	NR	Kent Cup	Beijing Indoor Stadium	Beijing	(Thailand) Sakchai Sim-Ngam	(Hong Kong) Franky Chan	4–1	
04–15	05–01	ENG	WR	World Snooker Championship	Crucible Theatre	Sheffield	(England) Steve Davis	(England) John Parrott	18–3	
05–06	05–13	WAL	NR	Pontins Professional	Pontins	Prestatyn	(Wales) Darren Morgan	(Malta) Tony Drago	9–2	
01–17	05–14	EUR	NR	Matchroom League			(England) Steve Davis	(England) John Parrott	(Note: No play-off was held and the title was decided on league table only.)	
09–28	05–23	ENG	NR	London Masters	Café Royal	London	(Scotland) Stephen Hendry	(England) John Parrott	4–2	

WR = World ranking event
NR = Non-ranking event

== Official rankings ==
The top 16 of the world rankings, these players automatically played in the final rounds of the world ranking events and were invited for the Masters.

No.	Ch.	Name
1	Steady	(England) Steve Davis
2	Steady	(England) Jimmy White
3	Steady	(England) Neal Foulds
4	▲	(Scotland) Stephen Hendry
5	▲	(Wales) Terry Griffiths
6	▼	(Canada) Cliff Thorburn
7	▲	(England) John Parrott
8	▼	(England) Tony Knowles
9	▲	(England) Mike Hallett
10	▼	(Northern Ireland) Dennis Taylor
11	▼	(England) Joe Johnson
12	▼	(South Africa) Silvino Francisco
13	▼	(England) Willie Thorne
14	▲	(South Africa) Peter Francisco
15	▲	(England) John Virgo
16	▲	(Wales) Cliff Wilson
