= Dean Reynolds =

English snooker player

Personal information
- Born: 11 January 1963 (age 63) Grimsby, Lincolnshire

Sport
- Country: England
- Sport: Snooker
- Professional: 1981–2001
- Highest ranking: 8 (1990/91)
- Best ranking finish: Runner-up (x2)

Dean Reynolds (born 11 January 1963 in Grimsby) is an English former professional snooker player whose career spanned twenty years from 1981 to 2001.

== Early and personal life ==
From Grimsby, Reynolds is a left-handed player and started playing snooker at the age of five years-old with his father 'Butch' who was a league standard club player. By the age of 12 years-old, Reynolds was displaying aptitude for the game, and in 1979 he won the Grimsby Boys Championships and the Lincolnshire and South Humberside Junior Championships.

== Career ==
Prior to turning professional in 1981, Reynolds won the first-ever Junior Pot Black in 1981, beating another future professional, Dene O'Kane, with a two-frame aggregate score of 151–79. He also defeated defending champion Tommy Murphy in the national under-19 championships that year.

In his first professional event, he qualified for The Crucible stages of the 1982 World Snooker Championship, after beating Ray Edmonds in the final round of qualifying. At the Championship he was the youngest player to qualify, and was drawn against the oldest, and he triumphed, winning 10-7 against Fred Davis, before his run was ended by South African Silvino Francisco.

In his first full season he defeated Willie Thorne at the 1982 International Open before being whitewashed by Steve Davis in the next round. He defeated Edmonds again in the final round of qualifying for the 1983 Snooker World Championship, where he was defeated by Alex Higgins.

He reached the quarter finals of the 1984 Rothmans Grand Prix where he was again whitewashed by Davis, and the semi-finals of the 1987 Mercantile Credit Classic as he became a top-16 player for the first time. He defeated Neal Foulds in the final of the English professional championships in 1988.

He twice reached a ranking tournament final, but lost on both occasions, the first at the 1989 British Open against Tony Meo, and the second at the 1989 Grand Prix against Steve Davis.

Reynolds is one of the select band of players who have achieved a 16-red clearance in competition, having made a 143 break after potting a free ball at the 2006 European Team Championships in Carlow.

In April 2009, Reynolds suffered a stroke and had to relearn his snooker technique.

== Performance and rankings timeline ==
Tournament	1981/ 82	1982/ 83	1983/ 84	1984/ 85	1985/ 86	1986/ 87	1987/ 88	1988/ 89	1989/ 90	1990/ 91	1991/ 92	1992/ 93	1993/ 94		1994/ 95	1995/ 96	1996/ 97	1997/ 98	1998/ 99	1999/ 00	2000/ 01	2001/ 02	2002/ 03	2011/ 12	2012/ 13	2013/ 14	2014/ 15	2015/ 16
Ranking	(Note: New players on the Main Tour do not have a ranking)	22	19	22	24	29	15	22	15	8	12	19	28		29	30	38	51	54	55	69	(Note: He was an amateur)						
Ranking tournaments
Australian Goldfields Open (Note: The event was called the Australian Masters (1981/1982-1987/1988 and 1995/1996), the Hong Kong Open (1989/1990) and the Australian Open (1994/1995-1995/1996))	Non-Ranking Event							NH	1R	Tournament Not Held					Non-Ranking		Tournament Not Held							A	A	A	A	A
UK Championship	Non-Ranking Event			LQ	2R	3R	1R	3R	3R	1R	QF	3R	3R		2R	1R	LQ	3R	LQ	LQ	LQ	A	A	A	A	A	A	A
German Masters (Note: The event was called the German Open (1995/1996-1997/1998) and the Grand Prix (1984/1985-2000/2001))	Tournament Not Held															1R	1R	LQ	NR	Tournament Not Held				A	A	A	A	A
Welsh Open	Tournament Not Held										3R	1R	1R		1R	1R	2R	LQ	LQ	LQ	LQ	A	A	A	A	A	A	A
World Grand Prix	Tournament Not Held																										NR	DNQ
Players Championship Grand Final	Tournament Not Held																							DNQ	DNQ	DNQ	DNQ	DNQ
China Open (Note: The event was called the China International (1997/1998-1998/1999))	Tournament Not Held																	NR	LQ	LQ	LQ	A	NH	A	A	A	A	A
World Championship	2R	1R	LQ	1R	1R	1R	1R	QF	2R	2R	1R	1R	LQ		LQ	LQ	LQ	LQ	LQ	LQ	LQ	LQ	LQ	A	A	A	A	A
Non-ranking tournaments
World Seniors Championship	Tournament Not Held										A	Tournament Not Held												LQ	LQ	LQ	LQ	LQ
The Masters	A	1R	A	A	A	A	1R	A	WR	1R	QF	LQ	LQ		LQ	LQ	LQ	LQ	LQ	LQ	LQ	LQ	A	A	A	A	A	A
Shoot-Out	Tournament Not Held									4R	Tournament Not Held													A	A	A	A	A
Former ranking tournaments
Canadian Masters	Tournament Not Held				Non-Ranking Event			1R	Tournament Not Held																			
Classic	Non-Ranking		1R	LQ	2R	SF	2R	2R	2R	1R	1R	Tournament Not Held																
Strachan Open (Note: The event was called the Strachan Challenge (1992/1993-1993/1994))	Tournament Not Held										3R	MR	NR		Tournament Not Held													
Asian Classic (Note: The event was called the Dubai Masters (1988/1989), the Dubai Classic (1989/1990-1994/1995) and the Thailand Classic (1995/1996))	Tournament Not Held							NR	QF	SF	3R	1R	LQ		1R	1R	1R	Tournament Not Held										
Malta Grand Prix	Tournament Not Held														Non-Ranking Event					LQ	NR	Tournament Not Held						
Thailand Masters (Note: The event was called the Asian Open (1989/1990-1992/1993) and the Thailand Open (1993/1994-1996/1997))	Not Held		Non-Ranking Event				Not Held		2R	2R	3R	2R	2R		LQ	LQ	LQ	LQ	WD	LQ	LQ	A	NR	Tournament Not Held				
British Open (Note: The event was called the International Masters (1981/1982-1983/1984))	Non-Ranking Event			2R	1R	2R	1R	F	2R	3R	1R	1R	1R		2R	2R	LQ	1R	1R	1R	LQ	A	A	Tournament Not Held				
European Open (Note: The event was called the Irish Open (1998/1999))	Tournament Not Held							WD	2R	3R	2R	2R	3R		3R	LQ	LQ	NH	LQ	Not Held		A	A	Tournament Not Held				
Scottish Open (Note: The event was called the International Open (1981/1982-1984/1985, 1986/1987-1989/1990 and 1992/1993-1996/1997) and the Goya Matchroom Trophy (1985/1986))	NR	2R	1R	1R	3R	QF	1R	SF	1R	Not Held		1R	2R		1R	1R	LQ	1R	LQ	LQ	LQ	A	A	NH	MR	Not Held		
World Open (Note: The event was called the Professional Players Tournament (1982/1983-1983/1984), the Grand Prix (1984/1985-2000/2001) and the LG Cup (2001/2002-2002/2003))	NH	QF	2R	QF	1R	1R	1R	2R	F	1R	2R	1R	1R		2R	1R	LQ	LQ	1R	LQ	LQ	A	A	A	A	A	Not Held	
Former non-ranking tournaments
UK Championship	A	2R	1R	Ranking Event																								
International Masters	LQ	LQ	LQ	Ranking Event																								
English Professional Championship	Not Held			QF	QF	QF	W	2R	Tournament Not Held																			
New Zealand Masters	Not Held		A	A	Not Held			QF	A	Tournament Not Held																		
World Masters	Tournament Not Held									1R	Tournament Not Held																	
Hong Kong Challenge (Note: The event was called the Hong Kong Masters (1983/1984-1988/1989) and the World Series Challenge (1990/1991))	Not Held		A	A	A	A	A	A	NH	QF	A	Tournament Not Held																
Kent Classic (Note: The event was called the Kent Cup (1986/1987-1990/1991))	Tournament Not Held					A	SF	A	A	A	NH	A	Tournament Not Held															
World Matchplay	Tournament Not Held							A	SF	QF	1R	A	Tournament Not Held															
Pot Black	A	A	A	A	A	Tournament Not Held					1R	A	A		Tournament Not Held													
Strachan Challenge	Tournament Not Held										R	MR	LQ	1R	Tournament Not Held													
Australian Masters	A	A	A	A	A	A	1R	NH	R	Tournament Not Held					A	A	Tournament Not Held											
Belgian Masters	Tournament Not Held									QF	A	A	Not Held			A	Tournament Not Held											
Pontins Professional	A	A	A	A	A	A	QF	A	A	A	A	A	A		A	A	A	A	A	A	Tournament Not Held							
Irish Masters	A	A	A	A	A	A	A	A	A	1R	A	A	A		A	A	A	A	A	A	A	A	R	Tournament Not Held				
Scottish Masters	A	A	A	A	A	A	A	NH	A	1R	A	A	A		A	A	A	A	A	A	A	A	A	Tournament Not Held				

Performance Table Legend
LQ	lost in the qualifying draw	#R	lost in the early rounds of the tournament (WR = Wildcard round, RR = Round robin)	QF	lost in the quarter-finals
SF	lost in the semi–finals	F	lost in the final	W	won the tournament
DNQ	did not qualify for the tournament	A	did not participate in the tournament	WD	withdrew from the tournament

NH / Not Held	means an event was not held
NR / Non-Ranking Event	means an event is/was no longer a ranking event
R / Ranking Event	means an event is/was a ranking event
MR / Minor-Ranking Event	means an event is/was a minor-ranking event

== Career finals ==
=== Ranking finals: 2 ===
Outcome	No.	Year	Championship	Opponent in the final	Score
Runner-up	1.	1989	British Open	(England) Tony Meo	6–13
Runner-up	2.	1989	Grand Prix	(England) Steve Davis	0–10

=== Non-ranking finals: 3 (2 titles) ===
Outcome	No.	Year	Championship	Opponent in the final	Score
Winner	1.	1988	English Professional Championship	(England) Neal Foulds	9–5
Winner	2.	1994	Merseyside Professional Championship	(England) Jason Ferguson	5–1
Runner-up	1.	1995	Merseyside Professional Championship	(England) Rod Lawler	4–5

=== Amateur finals: 2 (2 titles) ===
Outcome	No.	Year	Championship	Opponent in the final	Score
Winner	1.	1981	Junior Pot Black	(New Zealand) Dene O'Kane	151–79 (Note: Final decided on aggregate score over two frames)
Winner	2.	1981	British Under-19 Championship	(Northern Ireland) Tommy Murphy	3–1
