= British Open (snooker) =

Snooker tournament

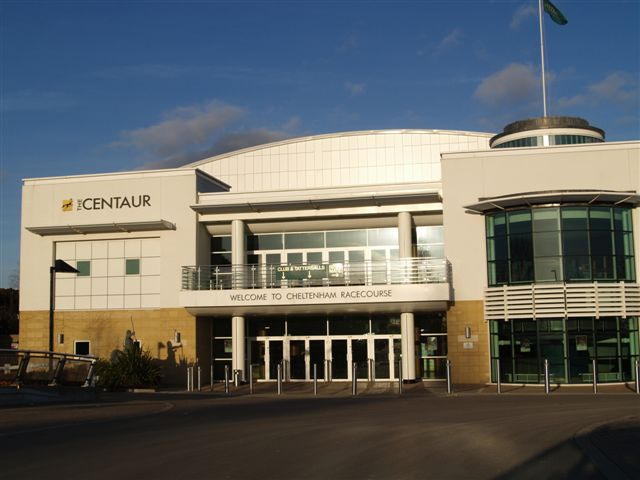
- The Centaur in Cheltenham has hosted the tournament since 2023

Tournament information
- Venue: The Centaur
- Location: Cheltenham
- Country: England
- Established: 1980
- Organisation(s): World Snooker Tour
- Format: Ranking event
- Total prize fund: £502,000
- Winner's share: £100,000
- Recent edition: 2026
- Current champion: Jak Jones (WAL)

The British Open is a professional snooker tournament, established in 1980 and held as a ranking tournament from 1985. Originally known as the British Gold Cup, the event has had various sponsors and venues over the early years, until the 2005–06 season where it was initially dropped. The "FA Cup-like" flat draws format was introduced in 1990 from the last 32 stage of the event and has differentiated itself from the other regular knock-out events; the unique format was retained when the tournament was reinstated from the 2021–2022 season, where draws in every round of this event are now randomised. The tournament currently awards the Clive Everton Trophy, named after the popular commentator.

The record for the most titles is held by Englishman Steve Davis with five, one ahead of Scots Stephen Hendry and John Higgins. The reigning champion is Jak Jones from Wales, who won his first title in 2026.

== History ==
The tournament began in 1980 as the British Gold Cup in the Derby Assembly Rooms. It was a sixteen-man invitation event and was played on a round robin basis with the group winners advancing to the semi-finals. The next year Yamaha took over sponsorship and the tournament was renamed the Yamaha Organs Trophy. The next year the tournaments name was changed to International Masters. The top eight of the first round robin stage played in two further groups and the winners advanced to the final. For 1984 the field of the tournament was increased to 27 and nine three-man groups were organised. The winners played in three semi-final groups and the winners played in a three-man round robin final.

After WPBSA decided to increase the number of ranking events in 1984/1985 and Yamaha withdrew its sponsorship the event was renamed the British Open. Dulux was the sponsor of the event between 1985 and 1987. In the next six years the event had four different sponsors: MIM Britannia Unit Trusts in 1988, Anglian Windows in 1989, Pearl Assurance between 1990 and 1992, and Wickes Home Improvements in 1993. In 1994 the tournament was moved to the Plymouth Pavilions. Between 1994 and 2004 the event was sponsored in only three years by Castella in 1995 and 1996, and by Stan James in 2001.

The tournament usually took place around November each year. Prior to the 1999/2000 season, it was held later in the season. As a result, two tournaments were held in 1999, one for the 1998/1999 season and one for the 1999/2000 season. The event than moved to the Telewest Arena in Newcastle for 2001, the Telford International Centre for 2002 and the Brighton Centre for 2003 and 2004. The event was dropped from the calendar in 2005/2006.

There have been eleven maximum breaks during the history of the tournament. James Wattana made the first in 1992 in the last 16 against Tony Drago. The second and third came at the qualifying stage of the event. David McDonnell compiled it in the fourth round of the 1995 event against Nic Barrow and Jason Prince in the fifth round of the first 1999 event against Ian Brumby. Graeme Dott made the fourth at the same event in the last 64 against David Roe. The fifth was Stephen Hendry's sixth official maximum break, which he compiled in the final of the second 1999 event against Peter Ebdon. The sixth was compiled by John Higgins in 2003 in the last 32 against Michael Judge. The revived 2021 event recorded two maximum breaks. Higgins made one in the first frame of his first round win over Alexander Ursenbacher, while Ali Carter made his during the second frame of his fourth round match against Elliot Slessor. The ninth maximum was made in 2022 by Mark Selby in the third round against Jack Lisowski. The tenth was compiled in 2024 by Mark Allen in his third round match against Ben Mertens. The eleventh was made during qualifying for the 2026 event by Liam Highfield in his match against Stephen Maguire.

== Winners ==
Year	Winner	Runner-up	Score	Venue	City	Season
British Gold Cup (non-ranking, 1980)
1980	Alex Higgins (NIR)	Ray Reardon (WAL)	5–1	Assembly Rooms	Derby, England	1979/80
Yamaha Organs Trophy (non-ranking, 1981)
1981	Steve Davis (ENG)	David Taylor (ENG)	9–6	Assembly Rooms	Derby, England	1980/81
International Masters (non-ranking, 1982–1984)
1982	Steve Davis (ENG)	Terry Griffiths (WAL)	9–7	Assembly Rooms	Derby, England	1981/82
1983	Ray Reardon (WAL)	Jimmy White (ENG)	9–6	Assembly Rooms	Derby, England	1982/83
1984	Steve Davis (ENG)	David Martin (ENG)	R-R (Note: Final was decided on a three-man round robin basis.)	Assembly Rooms	Derby, England	1983/84
British Open (ranking, 1985–2004)
1985	Silvino Francisco (RSA)	Kirk Stevens (CAN)	12–9	Assembly Rooms	Derby, England	1984/85
1986	Steve Davis (ENG)	Willie Thorne (ENG)	12–7	Assembly Rooms	Derby, England	1985/86
1987	Jimmy White (ENG)	Neal Foulds (ENG)	13–9	Assembly Rooms	Derby, England	1986/87
1988	Stephen Hendry (SCO)	Mike Hallett (ENG)	13–2	Assembly Rooms	Derby, England	1987/88
1989	Tony Meo (ENG)	Dean Reynolds (ENG)	13–6	Assembly Rooms	Derby, England	1988/89
1990	Bob Chaperon (CAN)	Alex Higgins (NIR)	10–8	Assembly Rooms	Derby, England	1989/90
1991	Stephen Hendry (SCO)	Gary Wilkinson (ENG)	10–9	Assembly Rooms	Derby, England	1990/91
1992	Jimmy White (ENG)	James Wattana (THA)	10–7	Assembly Rooms	Derby, England	1991/92
1993	Steve Davis (ENG)	James Wattana (THA)	10–2	Assembly Rooms	Derby, England	1992/93
1994	Ronnie O'Sullivan (ENG)	James Wattana (THA)	9–4	Plymouth Pavilions	Plymouth, England	1993/94
1995	John Higgins (SCO)	Ronnie O'Sullivan (ENG)	9–6	Plymouth Pavilions	Plymouth, England	1994/95
1996	Nigel Bond (ENG)	John Higgins (SCO)	9–8	Plymouth Pavilions	Plymouth, England	1995/96
1997	Mark Williams (WAL)	Stephen Hendry (SCO)	9–2	Plymouth Pavilions	Plymouth, England	1996/97
1998	John Higgins (SCO)	Stephen Hendry (SCO)	9–8	Plymouth Pavilions	Plymouth, England	1997/98
1999 (Apr)	Fergal O'Brien (IRL)	Anthony Hamilton (ENG)	9–7	Plymouth Pavilions	Plymouth, England	1998/99
1999 (Sep)	Stephen Hendry (SCO)	Peter Ebdon (ENG)	9–5	Plymouth Pavilions	Plymouth, England	1999/00
2000	Peter Ebdon (ENG)	Jimmy White (ENG)	9–6	Plymouth Pavilions	Plymouth, England	2000/01
2001	John Higgins (SCO)	Graeme Dott (SCO)	9–6	Telewest Arena	Newcastle, England	2001/02
2002	Paul Hunter (ENG)	Ian McCulloch (ENG)	9–4	Telford International Arena	Telford, England	2002/03
2003	Stephen Hendry (SCO)	Ronnie O'Sullivan (ENG)	9–6	Brighton Centre	Brighton, England	2003/04
2004	John Higgins (SCO)	Stephen Maguire (SCO)	9–6	Brighton Centre	Brighton, England	2004/05
British Open (renewed, ranking, 2021–present)
2021	Mark Williams (WAL)	Gary Wilson (ENG)	6–4	Morningside Arena	Leicester, England	2021/22
2022	Ryan Day (WAL)	Mark Allen (NIR)	10–7	Marshall Arena	Milton Keynes, England	2022/23
2023	Mark Williams (WAL)	Mark Selby (ENG)	10–7	The Centaur	Cheltenham, England	2023/24
2024	Mark Selby (ENG)	John Higgins (SCO)	10–5	The Centaur	Cheltenham, England	2024/25
2025	Shaun Murphy (ENG)	Anthony McGill (SCO)	10–7	The Centaur	Cheltenham, England	2025/26
2026	Jak Jones (WAL)	Mark Selby (ENG)	10–6	The Centaur	Cheltenham, England	2026/27
