= 1988 Grand Prix =

1988 Grand Prix may refer to:

- 1988 Grand Prix (snooker)
- 1988 Grand Prix (tennis)
