= 1988 Irish Masters =

Irish Masters
Tournament information
- Dates: 22–27 March 1988
- Venue: Goffs
- City: Kill
- Country: Ireland
- Organisation: WPBSA
- Format: Non-Ranking event
- Total prize fund: £110,000
- Winner's share: £26,000
- Highest break: Terry Griffiths (WAL) (139)

Final
- Champion: (England) Steve Davis
- Runner-up: (England) Neal Foulds
- Score: 9–4

The 1988 Irish Masters was the fourteenth edition of the professional invitational snooker tournament, which took place from 22 to 27 March 1988. The tournament was played at Goffs in Kill, County Kildare, and featured twelve professional players.

Steve Davis won the title for the fourth time, beating Neal Foulds 9–4 in the final.

== Main draw ==
Round 1 Best of 9 frames
(England) Joe Johnson	5
(Republic of Ireland) Eugene Hughes	4
(Northern Ireland) Alex Higgins	5
(Northern Ireland) Dennis Taylor	3
(England) Tony Knowles	5
(England) Willie Thorne	3
(Wales) Terry Griffiths	5
(England) Rex Williams	1

Quarter-finals; Best of 9 frames
(England) Steve Davis	5
(England) Joe Johnson	0
(Northern Ireland) Alex Higgins	5
(Canada) Cliff Thorburn	3
(England) Neal Foulds	5
(England) Tony Knowles	3
(Wales) Terry Griffiths	5
(England) Jimmy White	2

Semi-finals; Best of 11 frames
(England) Steve Davis	6
(Northern Ireland) Alex Higgins	2
(England) Neal Foulds	6
(Wales) Terry Griffiths	4

Final; Best of 17 frames
(England) Steve Davis	9
(England) Neal Foulds	4
