= 2000 World Seniors Masters =

World Seniors Masters
Tournament information
- Dates: 27–28 May 2000
- Venue: Royal Automobile Club
- City: London
- Country: England
- Organisation: WPBSA
- Format: Non-ranking event
- Total prize fund: £25,000
- Winner's share: £10,000
- Highest break: 50 Willie Thorne (ENG)

Final
- Champion: Willie Thorne (ENG)
- Runner-up: Cliff Thorburn (CAN)
- Score: 1–0 (84–8)

The 2000 World Seniors Masters was a professional invitational snooker tournament, which took place on 27–28 May 2000 at the Royal Automobile Club in London. Fifteen players participated, with David Taylor receiving a bye into the quarter-finals. All matches were one frame in length. Willie Thorne defeated Cliff Thorburn 84–8 in the final, winning £10,000.

== Main draw ==
Results from the tournament are shown below.

Last 16; Best of 1 frame
Willie Thorne (ENG)	75
Joe Johnson (ENG)	31
Rex Williams (ENG)	54
John Virgo (ENG)	31
David Taylor (ENG)	Bye
Graham Miles (ENG)	69
Ray Reardon (WAL)	46
Cliff Thorburn (CAN)	70
Doug Mountjoy (WAL)	1
Mike Hallett (ENG)	64
Kirk Stevens (CAN)	23
Jim Wych (CAN)	82
Perrie Mans (RSA)	13
Eddie Charlton (AUS)	60
Tony Knowles (ENG)	3

Quarter-finals; Best of 1 frame
Willie Thorne (ENG)	68
Rex Williams (ENG)	65
David Taylor (ENG)	75
Graham Miles (ENG)	13
Cliff Thorburn (CAN)	59
Mike Hallett (ENG)	57
Jim Wych (CAN)	63
Eddie Charlton (AUS)	7

Semi-finals; Best of 1 frame
Willie Thorne (ENG)	76
David Taylor (ENG)	24
Cliff Thorburn (CAN)	63
Jim Wych (CAN)	14

Final; Best of 1 frame
Willie Thorne (ENG)	84
Cliff Thorburn (CAN)	8
