= Neal Foulds =

English snooker player

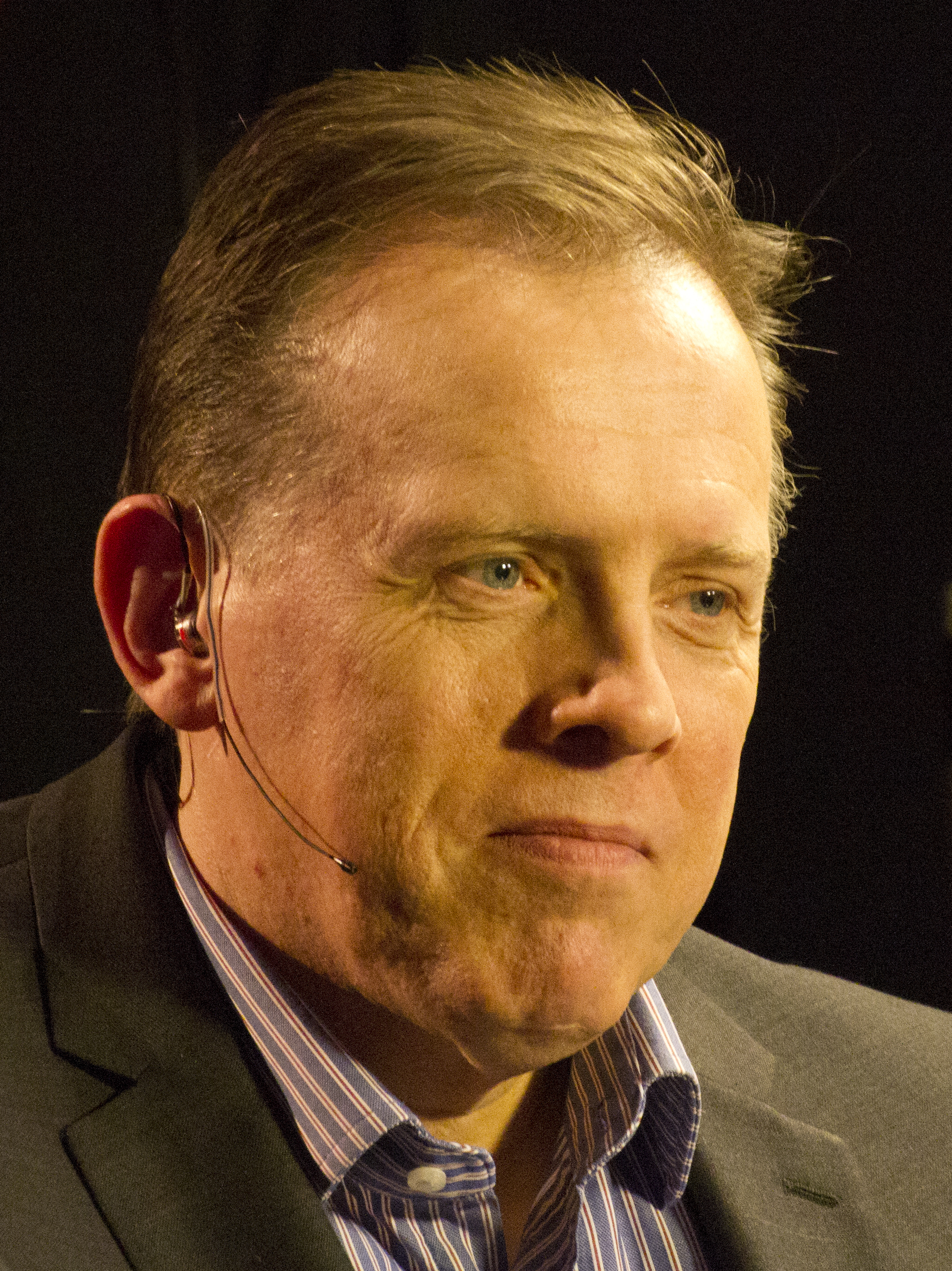
- Foulds as commentator at the 2015 German Masters

Personal information
- Nicknames: Fouldsy; Buzby
- Born: 13 July 1963 (age 63)

Sport
- Country: England
- Sport: Snooker
- Professional: 1983–2003
- Highest ranking: 3 (1987/1988, 1988/1989)

Tournament wins
- Ranking: 1

Neal Foulds (born 13 July 1963) is an English former professional snooker player and six-time tournament winner, including the 1986 International Open, the 1988 Dubai Masters and the 1992 Scottish Masters, as well as the invitational Pot Black in 1992. He was runner-up at the 1986 UK Championship and the 1987 British Open, and reached the semi-finals of three Masters tournaments and the 1987 World Championship. After his retirement, Foulds became a commentator for the BBC and is currently part of the presenting team for ITV and Eurosport.

== Career ==
The son of snooker professional Geoff Foulds, he began playing the game at the age of 11 and by the early 1980s was already one of the strongest players in his area. Following victory in the national under-19's Championship beating John Parrott in the final, Foulds then turned professional in 1983.

At the end of the season he qualified for the final stages of the World Championship at his first attempt. Even more impressively however, he then defeated twice-champion Alex Higgins 10–9 in the first round before going down 13–9 to Doug Mountjoy in the last 16, a run that saw him enter the rankings at number 30.

Foulds quickly climbed the rankings in the seasons that followed reaching no. 3 within four years. He won his first ranking tournament in 1986, the BCE International, beating Cliff Thorburn 12–9 in the final. In the same season he was runner-up to Steve Davis in the UK Championship, and he also reached the semi-finals of the 1987 World Championship, losing 16–9 to Joe Johnson. Starting the following season in a career high position of number three, 1987/88 was not to be quite as successful, though another strong run to the quarter-finals in the 1988 World Snooker Championship before losing to Terry Griffiths ensured that he would retain his spot at third in the rankings. Foulds also won the 1988 Dubai Masters, beating Steve Davis in the final, though this event would not hold any ranking points until the following year.

From here however he started to struggle, dropping 17 places to 20th in the rankings and finding himself having to qualify for events the following season. Still, 1989/90 was to see a revival and despite a round one exit at the World Championship to Wayne Jones, he did enough to regain a place in the top 16 before moving up to number seven at the end of 1990/1.

In 1992, Foulds was crowned the Scottish Masters champion and also won the 1992 edition of Pot Black, beating Nigel Bond, Jimmy White, and Gary Wilkinson en route to the final, where he beat James Wattana 252–176 on a points based final.

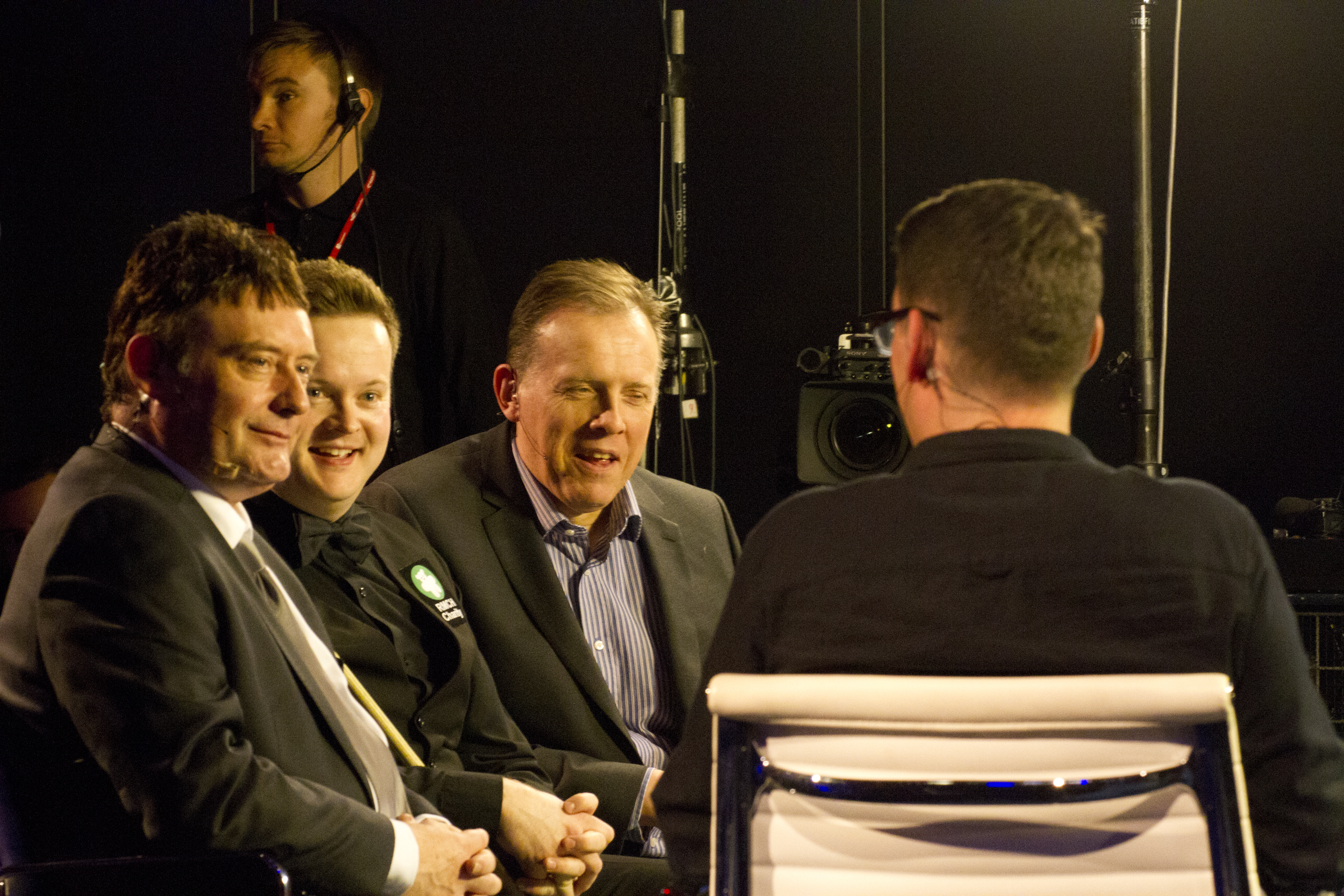
Foulds and Jimmy White in an interview with Shaun Murphy after his victory against Mark Allen

Though he was able to maintain a top 16 place until the end of the 1993/4 season, and a place on the tour until 2003, he played his final match as a Main Tour player on 13 January 2003 before retiring from competitive play aged 39.

Foulds made a brief reappearance as a player in November 2011 in the World Seniors (aged 48) before eventually losing to Dene O'Kane.

Foulds made 88 competitive century breaks in his career.

== Commentary career ==
Since his retirement, Foulds has moved up to the commentary box for [TNT], BBC, Sky Sports and he also co-hosts all ITV4 tournament coverage, interviewing players as well as commentating. In 2014, Foulds made a cameo as himself commentating on a fictional match at the climax of the snooker short film drama "Extended Rest".

== Personal life ==
Foulds has a son and a daughter. He supports Queens Park Rangers.

== Performance and rankings timeline ==
Tournament	1983/ 84	1984/ 85	1985/ 86	1986/ 87	1987/ 88	1988/ 89	1989/ 90	1990/ 91	1991/ 92	1992/ 93	1993/ 94	1994/ 95	1995/ 96	1996/ 97	1997/ 98	1998/ 99	1999/ 00	2000/ 01	2001/ 02	2002/ 03
Ranking	(Note: New players on the Main Tour do not have a ranking.)	30	23	13	3	3	20	13	6	4	14	25	28	21	30	34	40	73	71	78
Ranking tournaments
LG Cup (Note: The event ran under different names such as Professional Players Tournament (1983/1984) and Grand Prix (1984/1985 to 2000/2001).)	LQ	SF	2R	SF	1R	3R	2R	QF	3R	QF	3R	1R	2R	2R	1R	LQ	1R	LQ	LQ	LQ
British Open	NR	2R	2R	F	3R	3R	QF	2R	3R	1R	1R	3R	2R	1R	QF	LQ	LQ	LQ	1R	LQ
UK Championship	NR	LQ	3R	F	1R	2R	2R	3R	QF	1R	1R	1R	2R	1R	3R	1R	LQ	1R	LQ	LQ
Welsh Open	Tournament Not held								3R	3R	1R	2R	2R	1R	1R	1R	LQ	LQ	LQ	LQ
European Open (Note: The event ran under different names such as European Open (1988/1989 to 1996/1997 and 2001/2002 to 2003/2004) and Irish Open (1998/1999).)	Tournament Not held					1R	QF	QF	3R	1R	1R	1R	1R	LQ	NH	LQ	Not held		LQ	LQ
Irish Masters	Non-Ranking Event																			LQ
Scottish Open (Note: The event ran under different names such as International Open (1983/1984 to 1984/1985, 1986/1987 to 1996/1997), Goya Matchroom Trophy (1985/1986) and Players Championship (2003/2004).)	A	1R	SF	W	2R	2R	3R	Not held		1R	QF	2R	3R	1R	2R	LQ	LQ	LQ	LQ	LQ
World Championship	2R	1R	1R	SF	QF	1R	QF	2R	2R	QF	2R	LQ	1R	LQ	LQ	LQ	LQ	LQ	LQ	LQ
Non-ranking tournaments
Scottish Masters	A	A	A	A	QF	NH	A	A	QF	W	QF	A	LQ	A	A	A	A	A	A	A
The Masters	A	A	A	1R	1R	SF	A	QF	SF	1R	SF	A	A	A	A	A	A	A	A	A
Premier League (Note: The event was also called the Professional Snooker League (1983/1984), the Matchroom League (1986/1987–1991/1992) and the European League (1992/1993–1996/1997))	A	Not Held		F	RR	RR	RR	RR	RR	A	A	A	A	A	A	A	A	A	A	A
Former ranking tournaments
Canadian Masters	Not Held		Non-Ranking			LQ	Tournament Not Held													
Hong Kong Open (Note: The event ran under different names such as the Australian Masters (1983/1984 to 1987/1988 and 1995/1996) and Australian Open (1994/1995).)	Non-Ranking Event					NH	QF	Tournament Not held				NR	NR	Tournament Not held						
Classic	LQ	LQ	QF	1R	2R	2R	1R	SF	2R	Tournament Not Held										
Strachan Open	Tournament NH								1R	MR	NR	Tournament Not Held								
Dubai Classic (Note: The event run under different names as Dubai Masters (1988/1989), Thailand Classic (1995/1996) and Asian Classic (1996/1997))	Tournament Not Held					NR	A	3R	3R	1R	1R	LQ	LQ	1R	Tournament Not Held					
German Open	Tournament Not held												1R	LQ	LQ	NR	Tournament Not Held			
Malta Grand Prix	Tournament Not Held											Non-Ranking Event					LQ	NR	Not Held	
China Open (Note: The event ran under a different name as the China International (1997/1998 and 1998/1999))	Tournament Not Held														NR	LQ	LQ	LQ	LQ	NH
Thailand Masters (Note: The event ran under different names such as Asian Open (1989/1990 to 1992/1993) and Thailand Open (1993/1994 to 1996/1997).)	Non-Ranking Event				Not Held		2R	QF	2R	1R	2R	LQ	1R	1R	1R	LQ	LQ	LQ	LQ	NR
Former non-ranking tournaments
UK Championship	1R	Tournament Not Held																		
International Masters	RR	Ranking Tournament																		
Malaysian Masters	NH	A	NH	QF	Tournament Not Held									A	Tournament Not Held					
Carling Challenge	NH	A	A	A	SF	A	Tournament Not Held													
Tokyo Masters	Not Held				QF	Tournament Not Held														
Canadian Masters	Not Held		A	A	SF	R	Tournament Not Held													
Dubai Masters	Tournament Not Held					W	Ranking Event								Tournament Not Held					
Matchroom Professional Championship	Not Held			1R	SF	SF	Tournament Not Held													
Norwich Union Grand Prix	Tournament Not Held					RR	A	A	Tournament Not Held											
English Professional Championship	NH	2R	F	1R	F	SF	Tournament Not Held													
London Masters	Tournament Not Held						QF	A	A	Tournament Not Held										
Shoot-Out	Tournament Not Held							4R	Tournament Not Held											
World Masters	Tournament Not Held							2R	Tournament Not Held											
Thailand Masters	A	A	A	A	Not Held		Ranking		SF	Ranking Event										NR
Hong Kong Challenge (Note: The event was also called the Hong Kong Masters (1983/1984–1988/1989))	A	A	A	QF	QF	F	NH	A	1R	Tournament Not Held										
Indian Challenge	Tournament Not Held								QF	Tournament Not Held										
World Matchplay	Tournament Not Held					A	A	1R	1R	A	Tournament Not Held									
Belgian Challenge	Tournament Not Held								1R	Tournament Not Held										
Kent Classic (Note: The event was also called the Kent Cup (1986/1987–1987/1988 & 1989/1990–1990/1991))	Not Held			QF	A	A	A	A	NH	1R	Tournament Not Held									
European Challenge	Tournament Not Held								QF	A	Tournament Not Held									
Belgian Masters	Tournament Not Held							A	F	QF	Not Held		A	Tournament Not Held						
Irish Masters	A	A	A	A	F	QF	A	A	1R	1R	A	A	A	A	A	A	A	A	A	R
Pot Black	A	QF	A	Tournament Not Held					QF	W	1R	Tournament Not Held								
Pontins Professional	A	QF	QF	W	QF	A	A	W	F	QF	QF	QF	QF	SF	QF	A	A	Not Held		

Performance Table Legend
LQ	lost in the qualifying draw	#R	lost in the early rounds of the tournament (WR = Wildcard round, RR = Round robin)	QF	lost in the quarter-finals
SF	lost in the semi–finals	F	lost in the final	W	won the tournament
DNQ	did not qualify for the tournament	A	did not participate in the tournament	WD	withdrew from the tournament

NH / Not Held	means an event was not held.
NR / Non-Ranking Event	means an event is/was no longer a ranking event.
R / Ranking Event	means an event is/was a ranking event.
MR / Minor-Ranking Event	means an event is/was a minor-ranking event.

== Career finals ==
=== Ranking finals: 3 (1 title) ===
Legend
UK Championship (0–1)
Other (1–1)

Outcome	No.	Year	Championship	Opponent in the final	Score
Winner	1.	1986	International Open	(Canada) Cliff Thorburn	12–9
Runner-up	1.	1986	UK Championship	(England) Steve Davis	7–16
Runner-up	2.	1987	British Open	(England) Jimmy White	9–13

=== Non-ranking finals: 12 (5 titles) ===
Outcome	No.	Year	Championship	Opponent in the final	Score
Runner-up	1.	1986	English Professional Championship	(England) Tony Meo	7–9
Winner	1.	1987	Pontins Professional	(England) Willie Thorne	9–8
Runner-up	2.	1987	Matchroom League	(England) Steve Davis	Round-Robin
Runner-up	3.	1988	English Professional Championship (2)	(England) Dean Reynolds	5–9
Runner-up	4.	1988	Irish Masters	(England) Steve Davis	4–9
Runner-up	5.	1988	Hong Kong Masters	(England) Jimmy White	3–6
Winner	2.	1988	Dubai Masters	(England) Steve Davis	5–4
Winner	3.	1991	Pontins Professional (2)	(England) Mike Hallett	9–6
Runner-up	6.	1991	Belgian Masters	(England) Mike Hallett	7–9
Runner-up	7.	1992	Pontins Professional	(England) Steve James	8–9
Winner	4.	1992	Scottish Masters	(England) Gary Wilkinson	10–8
Winner	5.	1992	Pot Black	(Thailand) James Wattana	252–176 points

=== Pro-am finals: 3 (2 titles) ===
Outcome	No.	Year	Championship	Opponent in the final	Score
Winner	1.	1983	Warners Open	(England) Danny Fowler	4–0
Winner	2.	1984	Pontins Spring Open	(Wales) Doug Mountjoy	7–4
Runner-up	1.	1998	Pontins Spring Open	(Scotland) James McGouran	0–7

=== Team finals: 2 (2 titles) ===
Outcome	No.	Year	Championship	Team/partner	Opponent(s) in the final	Score
Winner	1.	1988	World Cup	England	Australia	9–7
Winner	2.	1989	World Cup (2)	England	Rest of the World	9–8

=== Amateur finals: 1 (1 title) ===
Outcome	No.	Year	Championship	Opponent in the final	Score
Winner	1.	1982	British Under-19 Championship	(England) John Parrott	3–2
