= 1991 Matchroom League =

Trust House Forte Matchroom League
Tournament information
- Dates: 1 February–31 May 1991
- Organisation: Matchroom Sport
- Format: Non-ranking event
- Winner's share: £50,000
- Highest break: John Parrott (ENG) 141

Final
- Champion: Stephen Hendry (SCO)
- Runner-up: Steve Davis (ENG)
- Score: Round-Robin

The 1991 Trust House Forte Matchroom League was a professional non-ranking snooker tournament that was played from the 1st of February to the 31st of May 1991.

Stephen Hendry topped the table and won the tournament for the first time ending Steve Davis who had won all previous titles since the League began in 1987.

== League phase ==
Ranking		(Scotland) HEN	(England) DAV	(England) WHI	(England) THO	(Thailand) WAT	(England) JAM	(England) FOU	(England) MEO	(Northern Ireland) TAY	(Wales) MOU	Frame W-L	Match W-D-L	Pld-Pts
Winner	Stephen Hendry	x	4	7	3	5	5	6	6	7	6	49–23	7–1–1	9–22
Runner-up	Steve Davis	4	x	4	4	4	4	4	6	7	7	44–28	3–6–0	9–15
3	Jimmy White	1	4	x	5	3	5	4	4	6	7	39–33	4–3–2	9–15
4	Willie Thorne	5	4	3	x	4	1	3	5	5	5	35–37	4–2–3	9–14
5	James Wattana	3	4	5	4	x	4	3	4	6	5	38–34	3–4–2	9–13
6	Steve James	3	4	3	7	4	x	1	6	4	6	38–34	3–3–3	9–12
7	Neal Foulds	2	4	4	5	5	7	x	3	4	3	37–35	3–3–3	9–12
8	Tony Meo	2	2	4	3	4	2	5	x	3	5	30–42	2–2–5	9–8
9	Dennis Taylor	1	1	2	3	2	4	4	5	x	4	26–46	1–3–5	9–6
10	Doug Mountjoy	2	1	1	3	3	2	5	3	4	x	24–48	1–1–7	9–4

If points were level then match wins, followed by most frames won determined their positions. If two players had an identical record then the result in their match determined their positions. If that ended 4–4 then the player who got to four first was higher.

- 1 February – Castle Leisure Centre, Bury
  - Tony Meo 5–3 Doug Mountjoy
  - Steve Davis 7–1 Dennis Taylor
- 2 February – Gateshead Leisure Centre, Gateshead
  - Tony Meo 5–3 Neal Foulds
  - Steve James 6–2 Doug Mountjoy
- 15 February – Harrogate International Centre, Harrogate
  - Steve James 7–1 Willie Thorne
  - Tony Meo 4–4 Jimmy White
- 16 February – Dome Leisure Centre, Doncaster
  - Stephen Hendry 5–3 Steve James
  - James Wattana 5–3 Jimmy White
- 8 March – Warwick Arts Centre, Coventry
  - Doug Mountjoy 5–3 Neal Foulds
  - Steve James 4–4 Steve Davis
- 9 March – Aston Villa Sports and Leisure Centre, Birmingham
  - Willie Thorne 5–3 Dennis Taylor
  - Neal Foulds 4–4 Jimmy White
- 22 March – Mountbatten Centre, Portsmouth
  - James Wattana 4–4 Tony Meo
  - Neal Foulds 4–4 Dennis Taylor
- 23 March – Brighton Centre, Brighton
  - Dennis Taylor 4–4 Doug Mountjoy
  - Jimmy White 5–3 Willie Thorne
- 24 March – Hawth Theatre, Crawley
  - Neal Foulds 7–1 Steve James
  - Jimmy White 6–2 Dennis Taylor
- 29 March – Thornaby Pavilion, Thornaby-on-Tees
  - Willie Thorne 4–4 James Wattana
  - Stephen Hendry 7–1 Jimmy White
- 30 March – Epic Centre, Ellesmere Port
  - James Wattana 5–3 Doug Mountjoy
  - Stephen Hendry 7–1 Dennis Taylor
- 31 March – Sands Centre, Carlisle
  - Neal Foulds 5–3 James Wattana
  - Willie Thorne 4–4 Steve Davis
- 12 April – Civic Centre, Aylesbury
  - Neal Foulds 5–3 Willie Thorne
  - Steve Davis 4–4 James Wattana
- 13 April – Link Centre, Swindon
  - Stephen Hendry 6–2 Tony Meo
  - Jimmy White 4–4 Steve Davis
- 10 May – University of York, York
  - Steve Davis 7–1 Doug Mountjoy
- 11 May – Meadowside Centre, Burton on Trent
  - Dennis Taylor 5–3 Tony Meo
  - Steve Davis 4–4 Neal Foulds
- 12 May – Derngate, Northampton
  - Stephen Hendry 6–2 Neal Foulds
- 17 May – Southport Theatre, Southport
  - Stephen Hendry 4–4 Steve Davis
  - Steve James 4–4 James Wattana
- 24 May – Perdiswell Centre, Worcester
  - Willie Thorne 5–3 Stephen Hendry
- 25 May – Plaza Centre, Exeter
  - Steve James 6–2 Tony Meo
  - Jimmy White 7–1 Doug Mountjoy
- 26 May - Copley Recreation Centre, Stalybridge
  - Stephen Hendry 6–2 Doug Mountjoy
- 27 May – Barnsley Metrodome, Barnsley
  - Willie Thorne 5–3 Doug Mountjoy
  - Steve Davis 6–2 Tony Meo
- 28 May – New Vic Theatre, Newcastle Under Lyme
  - James Wattana 6–2 Dennis Taylor
- 29 May – Sutton Leisure Centre, St Helens
  - Willie Thorne 5–3 Tony Meo
- 30 May– Mansfield
  - Dennis Taylor 4–4 Steve James
- 31 May – Brentwood Centre, Brentwood
  - Stephen Hendry 5–3 James Wattana
  - Jimmy White 5–3 Steve James
