= Willie Thorne =

English professional snooker player (1954–2020)

Personal information
- Nickname: Mr. Maximum
- Born: 4 March 1954 Anstey, Leicestershire, England
- Died: 17 June 2020 (aged 66) Torrevieja, Spain

Sport
- Country: England
- Sport: Snooker
- Professional: 1975–2001
- Highest ranking: 7 (1986–87, 1993–94)
- Maximum breaks: 1
- Century breaks: 126

Tournament wins
- Ranking: 1

William Joseph Thorne (4 March 1954 – 17 June 2020) was an English professional snooker player who turned professional in 1975 and competed until 2001. He won one ranking title, the 1985 Classic, and reached the final of the 1985 UK Championship, losing 16–14 to Steve Davis after leading 13–8. He peaked at world No. 7 in the rankings during the mid-1980s.

Thorne was noted for his break-building ability and was among the first players to compile 100 century breaks in competitive play. He achieved a maximum break at the 1987 UK Championship and earned the nickname "Mr Maximum". Throughout his career he also battled a serious gambling addiction, which he discussed publicly in interviews and in his autobiographies.

After retiring from professional play, Thorne became a snooker commentator, working primarily for the BBC from the 1980s until he was dropped from their broadcast team after the 2017–18 season. He also commentated for Sky, ITV, and BBC Wales.

In June 2015, Thorne was diagnosed with prostate cancer, and in March 2020 he announced he had been diagnosed with leukaemia. He died on 17 June 2020 in Torrevieja, Spain, aged 66, after being placed in an induced coma following respiratory failure.

== Career ==
Thorne was born on 4 March 1954, at the family home in Anstey, a village located near Leicester, to Bill Thorne, a Desford Colliery miner, and his wife Nancy. He had two brothers. Thorne was educated at the Thomas Rawlins School in Quorn, and played multiple sports but excelled the most in snooker. He began playing snooker while holidaying in Eastbourne at the age of 14. He left school at age 15 and became an estimator for a glass factory while practising snooker in Loughborough and then Leicester's snooker halls. Thorne became national Under-16 snooker champion in 1970, and won three consecutive National Under-19 Billiards Championship titles from 1971 to 1973.

He turned professional in 1975, but never really converted his early promise into success, only winning one ranking snooker tournament (The Classic in 1985). The same year, he reached the 1985 UK Championship final against the then dominant Steve Davis and seemed to have built himself an unassailable 13–8 lead, but a miss on a straightforward blue off its spot during the first frame of the final session allowed Davis to take the frame and eventually win the title. Thorne later said that he had "hardly looked" at the blue, considering it a "certainty". Thorne was runner-up in four other events that season: the British Open (losing 7–12 to Davis), the Scottish Masters (losing 7–9 to Cliff Thorburn), the Irish Masters (losing 5–9 to Jimmy White) and the Pontins Professional (losing 6–9 to Terry Griffiths).

He reached the quarter-finals of the World Snooker Championship in 1982 and 1986. Thorne won the 1986 Hong Kong Masters by 8–3 over Dennis Taylor in the final with century breaks of 102 and 106, and then defeated Davis 10–9 to claim the 1986 Matchroom Professional Championship.

He peaked at No. 7 in the world rankings in the mid-1980s, while also battling a serious gambling problem. Thorne began gambling when he frequented a billiard hall in central Leicester from the age of 16. In one incident, Thorne bet £38,000 on a match involving John Parrott, betting that Parrott would lose as he had lost his personal cue and had to use one supplied by the venue. Much to Thorne's dismay, not least because he was actually commentating on the match, Parrott recovered from a slow start to win, only worsening Thorne's debts. In an interview with The Guardian newspaper in 2004, Thorne admitted to placing bets of up to £20,000 on horses.

Thorne's bald head made him instantly recognisable on television. He first began commentating for the BBC during the 1980s, and he continued to work on the BBC's networked snooker coverage until he was dropped from the corporation's broadcast team after the 2017–18 season. He also had stints commentating on snooker for Sky and ITV. Thorne continued to commentate for BBC Wales on their coverage of the Welsh Open in February each year.

Alongside other Matchroom professionals, Thorne featured in the popular song "Snooker Loopy", written and performed by Chas & Dave. In the verse which begins "but old Willie Thorne, his hair's all gorn", Thorne's cameo line was "Perhaps I ought to chalk it", in reference to his gleaming head distracting his opponents. Thorne also appeared in the "Romford Rap" video with the rest of the "Matchroom Mob".

Thorne was described as a skilled break-builder and possibly the "missing link" between old-school percentage play and the current aggressive potting game. He took 19 seasons to record 100 competitive century breaks. He was only the third player to achieve this feat and achieved a maximum break at the 1987 UK Championship. Thorne claimed to have made almost 200 maximum breaks, and was known as "Mr Maximum". Thorne won the World Seniors Masters in 2000, beating Cliff Thorburn in the final.

After retiring from the game in 2001, Thorne did not play another match for sixteen years; however, he returned to action in 2017 in the World Seniors Championship, where he lost 1–3 in the first round to Aiden Owens. The World Seniors Tour was formed in the same year, but Thorne did not enter any events that season. He began his comeback in 2019 at the Seniors Irish Masters, where he faced Jimmy White in his first match in the quarter-finals, losing 0–3, and the World Seniors Championship, where he lost by the same scoreline in the first round to Darren Morgan. His next match, in the first round of the 2019 UK Seniors Championship, proved to be his last; drawn against Michael Judge, Thorne lost 2–3.

== Personal life ==
Thorne was married to former Miss Great Britain winner Jill Saxby and lived in Broughton Astley. He was previously married to Fiona Walker, with whom he had twin sons and a daughter. From 1982, he ran the Willie Thorne Snooker Centre club in Leicester, converted from a former motor taxation office. Mark Selby used to compete in junior tournaments there. In 2004, Thorne and writer Derek Marsden co-authored his first autobiography, Double or Quits. His second autobiography, Taking a Punt on My Life, was published in 2011.

In 2007, Thorne competed in Series 5 of Strictly Come Dancing with professional dance partner Erin Boag. They were voted off in the third week. He was friends with footballer Gary Lineker, which was the subject of the VHS production, Best of Friends – The Official Story of Gary Lineker & Willie Thorne. In 1985, Lineker was best man at Thorne's wedding.

=== Illness and death ===
In June 2015, Thorne was diagnosed with prostate cancer after a psychiatrist ordered routine blood tests. After diagnosis, Thorne began treatment.

Thorne tweeted on 18 March 2020 that he had been diagnosed with leukaemia. On 16 June 2020, he was placed in an induced coma after suffering respiratory failure in hospital in Spain. The following day, his carer reported that Thorne had gone into septic shock, was not responding to treatment, and died after his life support was withdrawn, aged 66.

== Performance and rankings timeline ==
Tournament	1974/ 75	1975/ 76	1976/ 77	1977/ 78	1978/ 79	1979/ 80	1980/ 81	1981/ 82	1982/ 83	1983/ 84	1984/ 85	1985/ 86	1986/ 87	1987/ 88	1988/ 89	1989/ 90	1990/ 91	1991/ 92	1992/ 93	1993/ 94	1994/ 95	1995/ 96	1996/ 97	1997/ 98	1998/ 99	1999/ 00	2000/ 01	2001/ 02
Ranking	(Note: He was an amateur.)	(Note: The ranking system did not begin until 1976.)	UR	20	15	17	20	22	16	18	12	11	7	11	13	9	11	17	15	7	15	25	25	36	51	75	76	(Note: He was not on the Main Tour.)
Ranking tournaments
British Open (Note: The event was also called the British Gold Cup (1979/1980), Yamaha Organs Trophy (1980/1981) and International Masters (1981/1982–1983/1984))	Tournament Not Held					Non-Ranking Event					2R	F	3R	3R	3R	1R	1R	2R	3R	2R	1R	1R	3R	1R	LQ	LQ	LQ	A
Grand Prix (Note: The event was also called the Professional Players Tournament (1982/83–1983/84) and the Grand Prix)	Tournament Not Held								2R	SF	3R	1R	3R	QF	1R	2R	3R	2R	2R	1R	1R	2R	1R	2R	LQ	1R	LQ	A
European Open	Tournament Not Held														3R	2R	3R	3R	1R	1R	QF	LQ	LQ	NH	LQ	Not Held		A
UK Championship	Not Held			Non-Ranking Event							QF	F	3R	SF	3R	3R	3R	3R	3R	1R	3R	2R	1R	1R	LQ	LQ	LQ	A
Welsh Open	Tournament Not Held																	QF	3R	1R	2R	1R	2R	LQ	LQ	LQ	LQ	A
China Open	Tournament Not Held																							NR	LQ	LQ	LQ	A
Thailand Masters (Note: The event was also called the Asian Open (1989/1990–1992/1993) and the Thailand Open (1994/1995–1997/1998))	Tournament Not Held									Non-Ranking Event				Not Held		QF	3R	SF	QF	1R	2R	2R	LQ	LQ	LQ	LQ	LQ	A
Scottish Open (Note: The event was also called the International Open (1981/1982 to 1996/1997) and the Matchroom Trophy (1985/1986))	Tournament Not Held							NR	1R	QF	QF	3R	1R	2R	3R	3R	Not Held		2R	2R	1R	1R	1R	LQ	2R	LQ	LQ	A
World Championship	A	LQ	1R	1R	LQ	1R	1R	QF	2R	2R	1R	QF	1R	2R	2R	2R	1R	2R	2R	2R	2R	1R	LQ	LQ	LQ	LQ	LQ	LQ
Non-ranking tournaments
Champions Cup (Note: The event was also called the Charity Challenge (1994/1995–1998/1999))	Tournament Not Held																				QF	QF	A	A	A	A	A	A
Scottish Masters	Tournament Not Held							A	A	A	A	F	A	A	NH	A	A	A	A	SF	A	A	A	A	A	A	A	A
The Masters	A	A	A	A	A	A	A	A	A	A	1R	QF	QF	1R	1R	QF	1R	A	1R	1R	WR	A	A	LQ	A	LQ	A	A
Irish Masters (Note: The event was also called the Benson & Hedges Ireland Tournament (1974/1975–1976/1977))	A	A	A	A	A	A	A	A	A	A	A	F	F	1R	A	QF	A	A	A	1R	A	A	A	A	A	A	A	A
Premier League (Note: The event was also called the Professional Snooker League (1983/1984), the Matchroom League (1986/1987–1991/1992) and the European League (1992/1993–1996/1997))	Tournament Not Held									A	Not Held		RR	RR	RR	RR	RR	RR	A	A	A	A	A	A	A	A	A	A
Former ranking tournaments
Canadian Masters (Note: The event was also called the Canadian Open (1974/1975–1980/1981))	Non-Ranking Event							Tournament Not Held				Non-Ranking			1R	Tournament Not Held												
Hong Kong Open (Note: The event was also called the Australian Masters (1979/1980–1987/1988 & 1995/1996) and Australian Open (1994/1995))	Tournament Not Held					Non-Ranking Event									NH	3R	Tournament Not Held				NR	NR	Tournament Not Held					
Classic	Tournament Not Held					Non-Ranking Event				LQ	W	1R	1R	2R	SF	1R	1R	2R	Tournament Not Held									
Strachan Open	Tournament Not Held																	1R	MR	NR	Tournament Not Held							
Dubai Classic (Note: The event was also called the Dubai Masters (1988/1989), Thailand Classic (1995/1996) and Asian Classic (1996/1997))	Tournament Not Held														NR	A	2R	1R	QF	2R	1R	LQ	1R	Tournament Not Held				
German Open	Tournament Not Held																					1R	LQ	LQ	Tournament Not Held			
Malta Grand Prix	Tournament Not Held																				Non-Ranking Event					LQ	NR	NH
Former non-ranking tournaments
Padmore Super Crystalate	Tournament Not Held					SF	Tournament Not Held																					
UK Championship	Not Held			QF	QF	2R	2R	2R	1R	2R	Ranking Event																	
British Open (Note: The event was also called the British Gold Cup (1979/1980), Yamaha Organs Trophy (1980/1981) and International Masters (1981/1982–1983/1984))	Tournament Not Held					RR	LQ	LQ	2R	2R	Ranking Event																	
Tolly Cobbold Classic	Tournament Not Held				A	A	A	QF	A	QF	Tournament Not Held																	
Thailand Masters	Tournament Not Held									A	A	RR	A	Not Held		Ranking Event												
Malaysian Masters	Tournament Not Held										A	NH	SF	Tournament Not Held									A	Tournament Not Held				
Canadian Masters (Note: The event was also called the Canadian Open (1974/1975–1980/1981))	QF	SF	1R	1R	2R	A	2R	Tournament Not Held				A	F	A	R	Tournament Not Held												
Tokyo Masters	Tournament Not Held													QF	Tournament Not Held													
Hong Kong Masters	Tournament Not Held									A	A	SF	W	QF	SF	NH	A	A	Tournament Not Held									
Dubai Classic (Note: The event was also called the Dubai Masters (1988/1989), Thailand Classic (1995/1996) and Asian Classic (1996/1997))	Tournament Not Held														SF	Ranking Event								Tournament Not Held				
Matchroom Professional Championship	Tournament Not Held												W	F	QF	Tournament Not Held												
Norwich Union Grand Prix	Tournament Not Held														RR	A	A	Tournament Not Held										
English Professional Championship	Tournament Not Held						SF	Not Held			2R	2R	SF	QF	QF	Tournament Not Held												
New Zealand Masters	Tournament Not Held										1R	A	Not Held			W	Tournament Not Held											
World Matchplay	Tournament Not Held														1R	1R	A	A	A	Tournament Not Held								
London Masters	Tournament Not Held														A	SF	A	Tournament Not Held										
Shoot-Out	Tournament Not Held																2R	Tournament Not Held										
World Masters	Tournament Not Held																3R	Tournament Not Held										
Indian Masters	Tournament Not Held																		RR	Tournament Not Held								
Kent Classic (Note: The event was also called the Kent Cup (1986/1987–1987/1988 & 1989/1990–1990/1991))	Tournament Not Held												W	A	A	A	A	NH	1R	Tournament Not Held								
European Challenge	Tournament Not Held																	A	QF	Tournament Not Held								
Pot Black	A	RR	SF	A	A	A	A	A	RR	SF	QF	A	Tournament Not Held					1R	1R	1R	Tournament Not Held							
Australian Masters (Note: The event was also called the Hong Kong Open (1989/1990) and Australian Open (1994/1995))	Tournament Not Held					A	A	A	A	A	QF	QF	A	A	NH	R	Tournament Not Held				F	A	Tournament Not Held					
Malta Grand Prix	Tournament Not Held																				QF	A	1R	A	A	R	A	NH
Seniors Pot Black	Tournament Not Held																						1R	Tournament Not Held				
Pontins Professional	A	QF	RR	A	A	A	F	QF	SF	W	SF	F	F	A	A	A	A	A	QF	A	A	A	QF	QF	A	Not Held		
World Seniors Masters	Tournament Not Held																									W	Not Held	

Performance Table Legend
LQ	lost in the qualifying draw	#R	lost in the early rounds of the tournament (WR = Wildcard round, RR = Round robin)	QF	lost in the quarter-finals
SF	lost in the semi-finals	F	lost in the final	W	won the tournament
DNQ	did not qualify for the tournament	A	did not participate in the tournament	WD	withdrew from the tournament

NH / Not Held	means an event was not held.
NR / Non-Ranking Event	means an event is/was no longer a ranking event.
R / Ranking Event	means an event is/was a ranking event.

== Career finals ==
=== Ranking finals: 3 (1 title) ===
Legend
UK Championship (0–1)
Other (1–1)

Outcome	No.	Year	Championship	Opponent in the final	Score	Ref.						
Winner	1.	1985	The Classic	Cliff Thorburn (CAN)	13–8							
Runner-up	1.	1985	UK Championship	Steve Davis (ENG)	14–16		Runner-up	2.	1986	British Open	Steve Davis (ENG)	7–12

=== Non-ranking finals: 14 (5 titles) ===
Outcome	No.	Year	Championship	Opponent in the final	Score	Ref.
Runner-up	1.	1981	Pontins Professional	Terry Griffiths (WAL)	8–9	
Winner	1.	1984	Pontins Professional	John Spencer (ENG)	9–7	
Runner-up	2.	1985	Scottish Masters	Cliff Thorburn (CAN)	7–9	
Runner-up	3.	1986	Irish Masters	Jimmy White (ENG)	5–9	
Runner-up	4.	1986	Pontins Professional (2)	Terry Griffiths (WAL)	6–9	
Winner	2.	1986	Hong Kong Masters	Dennis Taylor (NIR)	8–3	
Winner	3.	1986	Matchroom Professional Championship	Steve Davis (ENG)	10–9	
Runner-up	5.	1986	Canadian Masters	Steve Davis (ENG)	3–9	
Winner	4.	1987	Kent Cup	Jimmy White (ENG)	5–2	
Runner-up	6.	1987	Irish Masters (2)	Steve Davis (ENG)	1–9	
Runner-up	7.	1987	Pontins Professional (3)	Neal Foulds (ENG)	8–9	
Runner-up	8.	1987	Matchroom Professional Championship	Dennis Taylor (NIR)	3–10	
Winner	5.	1989	New Zealand Masters	Joe Johnson (ENG)	7–4	
Runner-up	9.	1994	Australian Open	John Higgins (SCO)	5–9	

=== Pro-am finals: 2 (1 title) ===
Outcome	No.	Year	Championship	Opponent in the final	Score	Ref.
Winner	1.	1980	Pontins Spring Open	Cliff Wilson (WAL)	7–3	
Runner-up	1.	1984	Warners Open	Martin Smith (ENG)	3–4	

=== Team finals: 2 ===
Outcome	No.	Year	Championship	Team/partner	Opponent(s) in the final	Score	Ref.
Runner-up	1.	1984	World Doubles Championship	Cliff Thorburn (CAN)	Alex Higgins (NIR); Jimmy White (ENG)	2–10	
Runner-up	2.	1995	Lowen Sport European Pro-Am	Dieter Johns (GER)	Peter Ebdon (ENG); Tim Price (ENG)	6–10	

=== Seniors finals: 1 (1 title) ===
Outcome	No.	Year	Championship	Opponent in the final	Score	Ref.
Winner	1.	2000	World Seniors Masters	Cliff Thorburn (CAN)	1–0	

=== Amateur finals: 8 (6 titles) ===
Amateur snooker championships
Outcome	No.	Year	Championship	Opponent in the final	Score	Ref.
Runner-up	1.	1969	British Under-16 Championship	Philip Hughes (WAL)	2–3	
Winner	1.	1970	British Under-16 Championship	Roger Mays (ENG)	3–2	
Winner	2.	1973	British Under-19 Championship	Peter Edworthy (ENG)	3–0	
Runner-up	2.	1975	English Amateur Championship	Sid Hood (ENG)	6–11	

British Junior English Billiards Championship
Outcome	No.	Year	Championship	Opponent in the final	Score	Ref.
Winner	1.	1970	Under-16 Championship	Peter Bardsley (ENG)	310–263	
Winner	2.	1971	Under-19 Championship	Russell Toombes (ENG)	728–321	
Winner	3.	1972	Under-19 Championship	Clive Palmer (WAL)	497–240	
Winner	4.	1974	Under-19 Championship	Peter Edworthy (ENG)	598–566	
