= 1987 Tokyo Masters =

Tokyo Masters
Tournament information
- Dates: 28–31 August 1987
- Venue: Tokyo Prince Hotel
- City: Tokyo
- Country: Japan
- Organisation: WPBSA
- Format: Non-ranking event
- Total prize fund: £30,000

Final
- Champion: (Northern Ireland) Dennis Taylor
- Runner-up: (Wales) Terry Griffiths
- Score: 6–3

The 1987 British Caledonian Tokyo Masters was a professional non-ranking snooker tournament that took place between 28 and 31 August 1987 at the Tokyo Prince Hotel in Tokyo, Japan. This was the first and so far only professional snooker tournament to be held in Japan.

Dennis Taylor won the tournament by defeating Terry Griffiths 6–3 in the final.

== Main draw ==
Quarter-finals; Best of 3 Frames
(Northern Ireland) Dennis Taylor	2
(England) Tony Meo	1
(England) Steve Davis	2
(England) Willie Thorne	0
(Wales) Terry Griffiths	2
(England) Neal Foulds	1
(England) Jimmy White	2
(Scotland) Stephen Hendry	0

Semi-finals; Best of 5 Frames
(Northern Ireland) Dennis Taylor	3
(England) Steve Davis	2
(Wales) Terry Griffiths	3
(England) Jimmy White	0

Final; Best of 11 Frames
(Northern Ireland) Dennis Taylor	6
(Wales) Terry Griffiths	3
