= 1993 Dubai Classic =

Dubai Classic
Tournament information
- Dates: 4–10 October 1993
- Venue: Al Nasr Stadium
- City: Dubai
- Country: United Arab Emirates
- Organisation: WPBSA
- Format: Ranking event
- Total prize fund: £224,000
- Winner's share: £40,000
- Highest break: Ronnie O'Sullivan (ENG) (140)

Final
- Champion: Stephen Hendry (SCO)
- Runner-up: Steve Davis (ENG)
- Score: 9–3

The 1993 Dubai Duty Free Classic was a professional ranking snooker tournament that took place between 4 and 10 October 1993 at the Al Nasr Stadium in Dubai, United Arab Emirates.

Stephen Hendry won the tournament, defeating Steve Davis 9–3 in the final. The defending champion John Parrott was eliminated by Andy Hicks in the last 16 round.

== Main draw ==
Last 32; Best of 9 frames
(Scotland) Stephen Hendry	5
(England) Anthony Hamilton	0
(England) Mark Davis	5
(England) Steve James	2
(England) Jonathan Birch	5
(Northern Ireland) Dennis Taylor	1
(Wales) Terry Griffiths	5
(England) Dave Finbow	2
(England) Ronnie O'Sullivan	5
(England) Neal Foulds	0
(England) Willie Thorne	5
(England) Nick Fruin	2
(England) Peter Ebdon	5
(England) David Roe	1
(England) Jimmy White	5
(Canada) Alain Robidoux	2
(England) Steve Davis	5
(Northern Ireland) Terry Murphy	0
(Wales) Darren Morgan	5
(Wales) Tony Chappel	2
(Republic of Ireland) Ken Doherty	5
(England) Stephen Lee	2
(Thailand) James Wattana	5
(New Zealand) Dene O'Kane	1
(Scotland) Alan McManus	5
(Northern Ireland) Joe Swail	3
(England) Martin Clark	w/o
(Wales) Doug Mountjoy	w/d
(England) Andy Hicks	5
(England) Nigel Bond	4
(England) John Parrott	5
(England) Chris Scanlon	0

Last 16; Best of 9 frames
(Scotland) Stephen Hendry	5
(England) Mark Davis	1
(England) Jonathan Birch	5
(Wales) Terry Griffiths	2
(England) Ronnie O'Sullivan	5
(England) Willie Thorne	1
(England) Peter Ebdon	5
(England) Jimmy White	4
(England) Steve Davis	5
(Wales) Darren Morgan	1
(Republic of Ireland) Ken Doherty	5
(Thailand) James Wattana	1
(Scotland) Alan McManus	5
(England) Martin Clark	4
(England) Andy Hicks	5
(England) John Parrott	3

Quarter-finals; Best of 9 frames
(Scotland) Stephen Hendry	5
(England) Jonathan Birch	0
(England) Ronnie O'Sullivan	5
(England) Peter Ebdon	2
(England) Steve Davis	5
(Republic of Ireland) Ken Doherty	4
(Scotland) Alan McManus	5
(England) Andy Hicks	3

Semi-finals; Best of 11 frames
(Scotland) Stephen Hendry	6
(England) Ronnie O'Sullivan	2
(England) Steve Davis	6
(Scotland) Alan McManus	3

Final; Best of 17 frames
(Scotland) Stephen Hendry	9
(England) Steve Davis	3
