= 1987 International Open =

1987 Fidelity Unit Trusts International Open
Tournament information
- Dates: 25 September – 4 October 1987 (TV stages)
- Venue: Trentham Gardens
- City: Stoke-on-Trent
- Country: England
- Organisation: WPBSA
- Format: Ranking event
- Total prize fund: £200,000
- Winner's share: £40,000
- Highest break: Steve Davis (ENG) (140)

Final
- Champion: Steve Davis (ENG)
- Runner-up: Cliff Thorburn (CAN)
- Score: 12–5

The 1987 International Open (officially the 1987 Fidelity Unit Trusts International Open) was a professional ranking snooker tournament that took place between September and October 1987 at Trentham Gardens in Stoke-on-Trent, England. The last 64 round took place between 9 and 12 September 1987 and television coverage on ITV from the last 32 to the final from 25 September to 4 October.

Steve Davis retained the title by defeating Cliff Thorburn 12–5 in the final.

An unusual situation happened in the last 16 match between Nigel Gilbert and Eddie Charlton, where Gilbert committed a foul on a re-spotted black by having the cue ball placed outside the D, awarding the frame to Charlton.

== Main draw ==
Last 64; Best of 9 frames
(England) Neal Foulds	5
(England) Paul Gibson	2
(Scotland) Stephen Hendry	5
(England) Gary Wilkinson	4
(Wales) Cliff Wilson	5
(Scotland) Eddie Sinclair	1
(England) Dave Gilbert	5
(England) Dave Martin	2
(Australia) Robby Foldvari	5
(England) Rex Williams	0
(Northern Ireland) Joe O'Boye	5
(Canada) Kirk Stevens	1
(Northern Ireland) Dennis Taylor	5
(England) Malcolm Bradley	0
(England) Martin Clark	5
(Malta) Tony Drago	2
(Canada) Jim Wych	5
(England) Joe Johnson	4
(Republic of Ireland) Eugene Hughes	5
(England) Ken Owers	4
(South Africa) Silvino Francisco	5
(Australia) Warren King	2
(Canada) Bill Werbeniuk	5
(England) Graham Cripsey	1
(England) David Roe	5
(Wales) Doug Mountjoy	4
(England) Steve James	5
(Australia) John Campbell	4
(Canada) Cliff Thorburn	5
(South Africa) Robbie Grace	1
(Wales) Steve Newbury	5
(South Africa) Peter Francisco	2
(England) Jimmy White	5
(Wales) Mark Bennett	3
(England) Steve Longworth	5
(England) Ian Williamson	4
(England) Mike Hallett	5
(Wales) Colin Roscoe	3
(England) John Spencer	5
(Northern Ireland) Jackie Rea	0
(Wales) Wayne Jones	5
(England) Dean Reynolds	4
(England) Nigel Gilbert	5
(Scotland) Murdo MacLeod	1
(Wales) Terry Griffiths	5
(England) Mark Wildman	1
(Australia) Eddie Charlton	5
(Wales) Ray Reardon	4
(England) Tony Knowles	5
(England) Danny Fowler	4
(England) David Taylor	5
(Canada) Mario Morra	3
(England) Willie Thorne	5
(Scotland) John Rea	3
(England) John Virgo	5
(Northern Ireland) Tommy Murphy	1
(England) John Parrott	5
(Wales) Tony Chappel	1
(Canada) Bob Chaperon	5
(England) Barry West	4
(England) Steve Davis	5
(New Zealand) Dene O'Kane	2
(England) Tony Meo	5
(England) Jon Wright	2

Last 32; Best of 9 frames
(England) Neal Foulds	2
(Scotland) Stephen Hendry	5
(Wales) Cliff Wilson	1
(England) Dave Gilbert	5
(Australia) Robby Foldvari	4
(Northern Ireland) Joe O'Boye	5
(Northern Ireland) Dennis Taylor	0
(England) Martin Clark	5
(Canada) Jim Wych	4
(Republic of Ireland) Eugene Hughes	5
(South Africa) Silvino Francisco	5
(Canada) Bill Werbeniuk	3
(England) David Roe	3
(England) Steve James	5
(Canada) Cliff Thorburn	5
(Wales) Steve Newbury	3
(England) Jimmy White	5
(England) Steve Longworth	1
(England) Mike Hallett	5
(England) John Spencer	2
(Wales) Wayne Jones	4
(England) Nigel Gilbert	5
(Wales) Terry Griffiths	2
(Australia) Eddie Charlton	5
(England) Tony Knowles	5
(England) David Taylor	2
(England) Willie Thorne	4
(England) John Virgo	5
(England) John Parrott	5
(Canada) Bob Chaperon	2
(England) Steve Davis	5
(England) Tony Meo	3

Last 16; Best of 9 frames
(Scotland) Stephen Hendry	5
(England) Dave Gilbert	0
(Northern Ireland) Joe O'Boye	5
(England) Martin Clark	2
(Republic of Ireland) Eugene Hughes	5
(South Africa) Silvino Francisco	4
(England) Steve James	0
(Canada) Cliff Thorburn	5
(England) Jimmy White	4
(England) Mike Hallett	5
(England) Nigel Gilbert	0
(Australia) Eddie Charlton	5
(England) Tony Knowles	2
(England) John Virgo	5
(England) John Parrott	2
(England) Steve Davis	5

Quarter-finals; Best of 9 frames
(Scotland) Stephen Hendry	5
(Northern Ireland) Joe O'Boye	2
(Republic of Ireland) Eugene Hughes	1
(Canada) Cliff Thorburn	5
(England) Mike Hallett	5
(Australia) Eddie Charlton	4
(England) John Virgo	2
(England) Steve Davis	5

Semi-finals; Best of 17 frames
(Scotland) Stephen Hendry	1
(Canada) Cliff Thorburn	9
(England) Mike Hallett	3
(England) Steve Davis	9

Final; Best of 23 frames
(Canada) Cliff Thorburn	5
(England) Steve Davis	12
