= 1994 European Open (snooker) =

1994 Humo European Open
Tournament information
- Dates: 11–17 December 1994
- Venue: Schijnpoort Arena
- City: Antwerp
- Country: Belgium
- Organisation: WPBSA
- Format: Ranking event
- Total prize fund: £325,000
- Winner's share: £60,000
- Highest break: Stephen Hendry (SCO) (136)

Final
- Champion: Stephen Hendry (SCO)
- Runner-up: John Parrott (ENG)
- Score: 9–3

The 1994 European Open (officially the 1994 Humo European Open) was a professional ranking snooker tournament that took place between 11 and 17 December 1994 at the Schijnpoort Arena in Antwerp, Belgium.

Defending champion Stephen Hendry won the tournament, defeating John Parrott 9–3 in the final.

== Wildcard round ==
Match		Score	
WC1	Anthony Davies (WAL)	5–4	Nico Devlies (BEL)
WC2	John Higgins (SCO)	5–1	Curd Persyn (BEL)
WC3	Mark King (ENG)	5–4	Alain de Cock (BEL)
WC4	Yvan van Velthoven (BEL)	5–4	Matthew Couch (ENG)

== Main draw ==
Last 32; Best of 9 frames
(Scotland) Stephen Hendry	5
(Canada) Alain Robidoux	4
(Malta) Tony Drago	5
(Scotland) John Higgins	4
(England) Willie Thorne	5
(Scotland) Billy Snaddon	4
(Wales) Darren Morgan	5
(Wales) Mark Bennett	1
(Scotland) Alan McManus	5
(England) Martin Clark	2
(England) Ronnie O'Sullivan	5
(England) Neal Foulds	2
(England) Dave Harold	5
(England) Peter Ebdon	3
(Belgium) Yvan van Velthoven	w/o
(England) Jimmy White	w/d
(Thailand) James Wattana	5
(England) Mark King	4
(England) Nigel Bond	5
(England) Steve James	1
(England) Dean Reynolds	5
(Northern Ireland) Joe Swail	3
(Republic of Ireland) Ken Doherty	5
(Wales) Doug Mountjoy	0
(England) John Parrott	5
(Wales) Anthony Davies	4
(England) David Roe	5
(England) Mick Price	1
(Wales) Terry Griffiths	5
(England) Gary Wilkinson	3
(England) Steve Davis	5
(England) Mike Hallett	0

Last 16; Best of 9 frames
(Scotland) Stephen Hendry	5
(Malta) Tony Drago	3
(England) Willie Thorne	5
(Wales) Darren Morgan	3
(Scotland) Alan McManus	3
(England) Ronnie O'Sullivan	5
(England) Dave Harold	5
(Belgium) Yvan van Velthoven	1
(Thailand) James Wattana	3
(England) Nigel Bond	5
(England) Dean Reynolds	2
(Republic of Ireland) Ken Doherty	5
(England) John Parrott	5
(England) David Roe	3
(Wales) Terry Griffiths	5
(England) Steve Davis	2

Quarter-finals; Best of 9 frames
(Scotland) Stephen Hendry	5
(England) Willie Thorne	2
(England) Ronnie O'Sullivan	5
(England) Dave Harold	1
(England) Nigel Bond	5
(Republic of Ireland) Ken Doherty	3
(England) John Parrott	5
(Wales) Terry Griffiths	2

Semi-finals; Best of 11 frames
(Scotland) Stephen Hendry	6
(England) Ronnie O'Sullivan	5
(England) Nigel Bond	4
(England) John Parrott	6

Final; Best of 17 frames
(Scotland) Stephen Hendry	9
(England) John Parrott	3
