= 1990 European Open (snooker) =

Tournament information
- Dates: 10–16 March 1990
- Venue: Palais des Sports
- City: Lyon
- Country: France
- Organisation: WPBSA
- Format: Ranking event
- Winner's share: £40,000

Final
- Champion: John Parrott (ENG)
- Runner-up: Stephen Hendry (SCO)
- Score: 10–6

The 1990 European Open was a professional ranking snooker tournament that took place in March 1990 at the Palais des Sports in Lyon, France.

John Parrott won the tournament, defeating Stephen Hendry 10–6 in the final.

== Prize fund ==
- Winner: £40,000
- Runner-up: £22,500
- Semi-final: £12,000
- Quarter-final: £6,000
- Last 16: £3,750
- Last 32: £2,500
- Last 64: £500
- Stage one highest break: £1,000
- Stage two highest break: £2,500
- Total: £200,000

== Main draw ==
=== Top half ===
Round 1 (Last 64); Best of 9 frames
1	(England) John Parrott	5
67	(England) Jon Wright	1
31	(Wales) Wayne Jones	5
59	(England) Ian Graham	1
11	(England) Joe Johnson	5
46	(England) Nigel Gilbert	2
21	(England) Barry West	2
36	(England) Danny Fowler	5
30	(Malta) Tony Drago	2
(England) Nigel Bond	5
15	(England) Dean Reynolds	5
53	(Wales) Darren Morgan	3
18	(Wales) Cliff Wilson	0
42	(Australia) John Campbell	5
6	(England) Mike Hallett	1
35	(Canada) Alain Robidoux	5
8	(Northern Ireland) Dennis Taylor	3
(England) Nick Dyson	5
17	(England) Martin Clark	5
38	(England) John Spencer	1
13	(England) John Virgo	5
(Scotland) Duncan Campbell	4
25	(South Africa) Peter Francisco	3
48	(Wales) Colin Roscoe	5
24	(Northern Ireland) Alex Higgins	5
75	(England) Ken Owers	2
16	(England) Steve James	5
(England) Barry Pinches	2
26	(England) David Roe	5
56	(England) Dave Martin	1
4	(England) Jimmy White	5
(Republic of Ireland) Stephen Murphy	0

Round 2 (Last 32); Best of 9 frames
1	(England) John Parrott	5
31	(Wales) Wayne Jones	0
11	(England) Joe Johnson	5
36	(England) Danny Fowler	1
(England) Nigel Bond	5
15	(England) Dean Reynolds	4
42	(Australia) John Campbell	5
35	(Canada) Alain Robidoux	4
(England) Nick Dyson	5
17	(England) Martin Clark	2
13	(England) John Virgo	2
48	(Wales) Colin Roscoe	5
24	(Northern Ireland) Alex Higgins	2
16	(England) Steve James	5
26	(England) David Roe	1
4	(England) Jimmy White	5

Round 3 (Last 16); Best of 9 frames
1	(England) John Parrott	5
11	(England) Joe Johnson	2
(England) Nigel Bond	5
42	(Australia) John Campbell	4
(England) Nick Dyson	2
48	(Wales) Colin Roscoe	5
16	(England) Steve James	5
4	(England) Jimmy White	4

Quarter-finals; Best of 9 frames
1	(England) John Parrott	5
(England) Nigel Bond	3
48	(Wales) Colin Roscoe	2
16	(England) Steve James	5

Semi-final; Best of 11 frames
1	(England) John Parrott	6
16	(England) Steve James	3

=== Bottom half ===
Round 1 (Last 64); Best of 9 frames
3	(Scotland) Stephen Hendry	5
77	(Australia) Robby Foldvari	1
19	(Wales) Steve Newbury	5
58	(Northern Ireland) Jack McLaughlin	2
12	(England) Tony Knowles	3
41	(Wales) Tony Chappel	5
27	(Republic of Ireland) Eugene Hughes	4
33	(England) David Taylor	5
20	(England) Neal Foulds	5
52	(England) Mark Johnston-Allen	2
9	(England) Willie Thorne	5
44	(Republic of Ireland) Paddy Browne	3
23	(South Africa) Silvino Francisco	5
85	(England) Bill Oliver	2
5	(Wales) Terry Griffiths	2
47	(Wales) Mark Bennett	5
7	(Canada) Cliff Thorburn	0
90	(England) Mick Price	5
22	(Australia) Eddie Charlton	5
105	(South Africa) Francois Ellis	3
10	(Wales) Doug Mountjoy	5
60	(England) Jim Chambers	4
32	(England) Rex Williams	5
40	(Republic of Ireland) Joe O'Boye	2
28	(New Zealand) Dene O'Kane	5
94	(Scotland) Eddie Sinclair	4
14	(England) Tony Meo	4
69	(England) Craig Edwards	5
29	(Canada) Bob Chaperon	5
113	(South Africa) Robbie Grace	2
2	(England) Steve Davis	5
61	(England) Roger Bales	2

Round 2 (Last 32); Best of 9 frames
3	(Scotland) Stephen Hendry	5
19	(Wales) Steve Newbury	1
41	(Wales) Tony Chappel	5
33	(England) David Taylor	2
20	(England) Neal Foulds	5
9	(England) Willie Thorne	3
23	(South Africa) Silvino Francisco	3
47	(Wales) Mark Bennett	5
90	(England) Mick Price	4
22	(Australia) Eddie Charlton	5
10	(Wales) Doug Mountjoy	5
32	(England) Rex Williams	0
28	(New Zealand) Dene O'Kane	2
69	(England) Craig Edwards	5
29	(Canada) Bob Chaperon	0
2	(England) Steve Davis	5

Round 3 (Last 16); Best of 9 frames
3	(Scotland) Stephen Hendry	5
41	(Wales) Tony Chappel	2
20	(England) Neal Foulds	5
47	(Wales) Mark Bennett	2
22	(Australia) Eddie Charlton	2
10	(Wales) Doug Mountjoy	5
69	(England) Craig Edwards	4
2	(England) Steve Davis	5

Quarter-finals; Best of 9 frames
3	(Scotland) Stephen Hendry	5
20	(England) Neal Foulds	3
10	(Wales) Doug Mountjoy	0
2	(England) Steve Davis	5

Semi-final; Best of 11 frames
3	(Scotland) Stephen Hendry	6
2	(England) Steve Davis	3

=== Final ===
Final: Best of 19 frames. Palais des Sports, Lyon, France, 16 March 1990.
John Parrott (1); England	10–6	Stephen Hendry (3); Scotland
Afternoon: 52-48; 46-75; 70-0 (69); 103-9 (74); 45-76; 49-51 (51); 77-5 (67); 82-24 (54); 1-67 (56); Evening: 57-59; 18-117 (117); 107-32 (64); 65-50 (56); 98-36; 65-60 (Parrott 57); 66-35
74	Highest break	117
0	Century breaks	1
7	50+ breaks	3

== Century breaks ==
=== Main stage centuries ===
- 122 – Steve James
- 117 – Stephen Hendry
- 106 – Jimmy White
- 101 – John Parrott

=== Qualifying stage centuries ===
- 134, 124 – Nick Terry
- 115 – Robby Foldvari
- 112 – Tony Jones
- 108 – Paddy Browne
- 100 – John Campbell
