= 1992 Pot Black =

Pot Black Timeframe
Tournament information
- Dates: 2–5 September 1992 (Broadcast 7 September – 14 October 1992)
- Venue: Norbreck Hydro
- City: Blackpool
- Country: England
- Organisation: WPBSA
- Format: Non-Ranking event

Final
- Champion: (England) Neal Foulds
- Runner-up: (Thailand) James Wattana
- Score: 252-176 points

The 1992 Pot Black was the second of the revived professional invitational snooker tournament and the 20th series altogether. It took place between 2 and 5 September 1992, and was broadcast in the autumn of the same year. The tournament was held in Blackpool, and featured sixteen professional players in a knock-out system.

This year, the series had been changed into a "timeframe" system which players would play at least one or two frames of snooker against the clock (each show was at least 20 minutes), the final being longer.

Broadcasts were shown on Mondays and Wednesdays and the series started at 15:00 on Monday 7 September 1992. Eamonn Holmes presented the series and Ted Lowe and Willie Thorne were the commentators with John Williams as referee.

Players in this year's series were the top 16 ranked players for the 1992–93 season except the No. 1 player Stephen Hendry and Darren Morgan. Replacing them were the first ever woman to play in series, Allison Fisher and the professional debut of the Junior Pot Black champion Ronnie O'Sullivan who beat defending Pot Black champion Steve Davis in the first show of the series. The final was won by Neal Foulds, beating debutant James Wattana

== Tournament draw ==
Last 16; Points based 20 Minutes timeframe
(England) Steve Davis	117
(England) Ronnie O'Sullivan	174
(England) Gary Wilkinson	114
(England) Steve James	93
(England) Neal Foulds	69
(England) Nigel Bond	57
(England) Jimmy White	120
(Northern Ireland) Dennis Taylor	98
(England) John Parrott	103
(England) Allison Fisher	91
(Wales) Terry Griffiths	73
(Canada) Alain Robidoux	124
(England) Willie Thorne	106
(Scotland) Alan McManus	96
(England) Martin Clark	79
(Thailand) James Wattana	116

Quarter-finals; Points based 20 Minutes timeframe
(England) Ronnie O'Sullivan	83
(England) Gary Wilkinson	134
(England) Neal Foulds	119
(England) Jimmy White	79
(England) John Parrott	99
(Canada) Alain Robidoux	96
(England) Willie Thorne	74
(Thailand) James Wattana	133

Semi-finals; Points based 20 Minutes timeframe
(England) Gary Wilkinson	84
(England) Neal Foulds	103
(England) John Parrott	84
(Thailand) James Wattana	128

Final; Points based 20 Minutes timeframe
(England) Neal Foulds	252
(Thailand) James Wattana	176

Match dates of transmission

Player 1	Player 2	Broadcast Date
(England) Ronnie O'Sullivan	(England) Steve Davis	7 September 1992
(England) Gary Wilkinson	(England) Steve James	9 September 1992
(England) Neal Foulds	(England) Nigel Bond	14 September 1992
(England) Jimmy White	(Northern Ireland) Dennis Taylor	16 September 1992
(England) John Parrott	(England) Allison Fisher	21 September 1992
(Canada) Alain Robidoux	(Wales) Terry Griffiths	23 September 1992
(England) Willie Thorne	(Scotland) Alan McManus	28 September 1992
(Thailand) James Wattana	(England) Martin Clark	30 September 1992
(England) Gary Wilkinson	(England) Ronnie O'Sullivan	5 October 1992
(England) Neal Foulds	(England) Jimmy White	5 October 1992
(England) John Parrott	(Canada) Alain Robidoux	7 October 1992
(Thailand) James Wattana	(England) Willie Thorne	7 October 1992
(England) Neal Foulds	(England) Gary Wilkinson	14 October 1992
(Thailand) James Wattana	(England) John Parrott	14 October 1992
(England) Neal Foulds	(Thailand) James Wattana	16 October 1992
