= 1986 Pontins Professional =

Tournament information
- Dates: 10–17 May 1986
- Venue: Pontin's
- City: Prestatyn
- Country: Wales
- Organisation: WPBSA
- Format: Non-Ranking event

Final
- Champion: (Wales) Terry Griffiths
- Runner-up: (England) Willie Thorne
- Score: 9–6

The 1986 Pontins Professional was the thirteenth edition of the professional invitational snooker tournament which took place between 10 and 17 May 1986 at Pontin's in Prestatyn, Wales.

The tournament featured eight professional players. The quarter-final matches were contested over the best of 9 frames, the semi-final matches over the best of 11 frames, and the final over the best of 17 frames.

Terry Griffiths won the event for the third time and the second in a row, beating Willie Thorne 9–6 in the final.

== Main draw ==
Quarter-finals; Best of 9 frames
(Wales) Terry Griffiths	5
(England) John Spencer	1
(Wales) Cliff Wilson	5
(Wales) Ray Reardon	4
(England) Willie Thorne	5
(England) John Parrott	1
(Scotland) Stephen Hendry	5
(England) Neal Foulds	3

Semi-finals; Best of 11 frames
(Wales) Terry Griffiths	6
(Wales) Cliff Wilson	2
(England) Willie Thorne	6
(Scotland) Stephen Hendry	2

Final; Best of 17 frames
(Wales) Terry Griffiths	9
(England) Willie Thorne	6
