= 1994 Dubai Classic =

Dubai Classic
Tournament information
- Dates: 30 September – 7 October 1994
- Venue: Al Nasr Stadium
- City: Dubai
- Country: United Arab Emirates
- Organisation: WPBSA
- Format: Ranking event
- Total prize fund: £224,000
- Winner's share: £40,000
- Highest break: Peter Ebdon (ENG) (130)

Final
- Champion: Alan McManus (SCO)
- Runner-up: Peter Ebdon (ENG)
- Score: 9–6

The 1994 Dubai Duty Free Classic was a professional ranking snooker tournament that took place between 30 September to 7 October 1994 at the Al Nasr Stadium in Dubai, United Arab Emirates.

Alan McManus won his first ranking title, defeating Peter Ebdon 9–6 in the final. The defending champion Stephen Hendry was eliminated by McManus in the semi-final.

== Prize money ==
The breakdown of prize money for this year is shown below:

Winner: £40,000
Runner-up: £22,500
Semi-final: £11,250
Quarter-final: £6,250
Last 16: £3,125
Last 32: £2,075
Last 64: £980
Last 96: £595

Pre-televised highest break: £1,000
Televised highest break: £2,000

== Main draw ==
Last 32; Best of 9 frames
(Scotland) Alan McManus	w/o
(England) Brian Rowswell	w/d
(Wales) Terry Griffiths	5
(England) Gary Wilkinson	2
(England) Nigel Bond	5
(England) Nick Fruin	2
(England) Jimmy White	5
(New Zealand) Dene O'Kane	2
(Scotland) Stephen Hendry	5
(England) Brian Morgan	3
(Wales) Dominic Dale	5
(England) Willie Thorne	3
(Republic of Ireland) Ken Doherty	5
(Scotland) Graeme Dott	2
(Malta) Tony Drago	5
(Republic of Ireland) Stephen Murphy	4
(England) Peter Ebdon	5
(Northern Ireland) Dennis Taylor	1
(Scotland) Billy Snaddon	5
(England) John Parrott	3
(Canada) Alain Robidoux	5
(Thailand) James Wattana	2
(England) David Roe	5
(Wales) Paul Davies	2
(England) Ronnie O'Sullivan	5
(England) Dave Finbow	1
(Scotland) John Higgins	5
(England) Steve Davis	4
(England) Martin Clark	5
(Northern Ireland) Joe Swail	4
(Wales) Darren Morgan	5
(England) Dean Reynolds	3

Last 16; Best of 9 frames
(Scotland) Alan McManus	5
(Wales) Terry Griffiths	2
(England) Nigel Bond	5
(England) Jimmy White	1
(Scotland) Stephen Hendry	5
(Wales) Dominic Dale	2
(Republic of Ireland) Ken Doherty	5
(Malta) Tony Drago	3
(England) Peter Ebdon	5
(Scotland) Billy Snaddon	4
(Canada) Alain Robidoux	5
(England) David Roe	4
(England) Ronnie O'Sullivan	5
(Scotland) John Higgins	1
(England) Martin Clark	5
(Wales) Darren Morgan	4

Quarter-finals; Best of 9 frames
(Scotland) Alan McManus	5
(England) Nigel Bond	4
(Scotland) Stephen Hendry	5
(Republic of Ireland) Ken Doherty	4
(England) Peter Ebdon	5
(Canada) Alain Robidoux	3
(England) Ronnie O'Sullivan	5
(England) Martin Clark	2

Semi-finals; Best of 11 frames
(Scotland) Alan McManus	6
(Scotland) Stephen Hendry	4
(England) Peter Ebdon	6
(England) Ronnie O'Sullivan	4

Final; Best of 17 frames
(Scotland) Alan McManus	9
(England) Peter Ebdon	6
