= 1992 Scottish Masters =

Scottish Masters
Tournament information
- Dates: 23–27 September 1992
- Venue: Motherwell Civic Centre
- City: Motherwell
- Country: Scotland
- Organisation: WPBSA
- Format: Non-ranking event
- Total prize fund: £121,000
- Winner's share: £40,000
- Highest break: (Thailand) James Wattana (137)

Final
- Champion: (England) Neal Foulds
- Runner-up: (England) Gary Wilkinson
- Score: 10–8

The 1992 Regal Scottish Masters was a professional non-ranking snooker tournament that took place between 23 and 27 September 1992 at the Motherwell Civic Centre in Motherwell, Scotland.

Neal Foulds won the tournament by defeating Gary Wilkinson 10–8 in the final.

== Prize fund ==
The breakdown of prize money for this year is shown below:

- Winner: £40,000
- Runner-up: £20,000
- Semi-final: £11,000
- Quarter-final: £6,250
- Round 1: £3,500
- Highest break: £3,000
- Total: £121,000

== Main draw ==
Round 1 Best of 9 Frames
(England) Neal Foulds	5
(Scotland) Chris Small	1
(Scotland) Alan McManus	3
(Thailand) James Wattana	5
(England) Gary Wilkinson	5
(Wales) Terry Griffiths	3
(England) Steve Davis	5
(Scotland) John Higgins	2

Quarter-finals; Best of 11 Frames
(England) Mike Hallett	1
(England) Neal Foulds	6
(England) Jimmy White	2
(Thailand) James Wattana	6
(Scotland) Stephen Hendry	5
(England) Gary Wilkinson	6
(England) John Parrott	1
(England) Steve Davis	6

Semi-finals; Best of 11 Frames
(England) Neal Foulds	6
(Thailand) James Wattana	2
(England) Gary Wilkinson	6
(England) Steve Davis	4

Final; Best of 19 Frames
(England) Neal Foulds	10
(England) Gary Wilkinson	8

== Century breaks ==
- 137 – James Wattana
- 136 – Neal Foulds
- 114 – Alan McManus
- 106 – Gary Wilkinson
