= 1988 Dubai Masters =

Dubai Masters
Tournament information
- Dates: 26–29 September 1988
- Venue: Al Nasr Stadium
- City: Dubai
- Country: United Arab Emirates
- Organisation: WPBSA
- Format: Non-ranking event
- Total prize fund: £75,000
- Winner's share: £25,000
- Highest break: Willie Thorne (ENG) (107)

Final
- Champion: (England) Neal Foulds
- Runner-up: (England) Steve Davis
- Score: 5–4

The 1988 Dubai Duty Free Masters was a non-ranking snooker tournament, which took place between 26 and 29 September 1988 at the Al Nasr Stadium in Dubai, United Arab Emirates.

The tournament featured eight professional players drawn against eight local players. Each of the professionals won 2–0 in their best-of-3-frame matches.

Neal Foulds won beating Steve Davis 5–4 in the final.

== Prize fund ==
The breakdown of prize money for this year is shown below:

- Winner: £25,000
- Runner-up: £12,000
- Semi-final: £8,000
- Quarter-final: £5,000
- Highest break: £2,000
- Total: £75,000

== Main draw ==
Last 16; Best of 3 frames
(England) Steve Davis	2
(United Arab Emirates) Attiq Qubasi	0
(Wales) Terry Griffiths	2
(United Arab Emirates) Abdulla Marzong	0
(England) Willie Thorne	2
(United Arab Emirates) George Philips	0
(Northern Ireland) Dennis Taylor	2
(United Arab Emirates) Obaid Khalifa	0
(England) Neal Foulds	2
(United Arab Emirates) Khalid Abbas	0
(Canada) Cliff Thorburn	2
(United Arab Emirates) Masood Mohammed	0
(England) Tony Meo	2
(United Arab Emirates) David Lulsie	0
(England) Jimmy White	2
(United Arab Emirates) Ali Mohammed Ali	0

Quarter-finals; Best of 5 frames
(England) Steve Davis	3
(Wales) Terry Griffiths	2
(England) Willie Thorne	3
(Northern Ireland) Dennis Taylor	0
(England) Neal Foulds	3
(Canada) Cliff Thorburn	1
(England) Tony Meo	3
(England) Jimmy White	2

Semi-finals; Best of 9 frames
(England) Steve Davis	5
(England) Willie Thorne	2
(England) Neal Foulds	5
(England) Tony Meo	4

Final; Best of 9 frames
(England) Steve Davis	4
(England) Neal Foulds	5
