= Dubai Classic =

Snooker tournament

Tournament information
- Venue: Riverside Montien Hotel
- Location: Bangkok
- Country: Thailand
- Established: 1988
- Organisation(s): World Professional Billiards and Snooker Association
- Format: Ranking event
- Final year: 1996
- Final champion: (England) Ronnie O'Sullivan

The Dubai Classic (also known as the Dubai Duty Free Classic for sponsorship and marketing purposes) was a professional ranking snooker tournament. The last champion was Ronnie O'Sullivan.

== History ==
It began life as the Dubai Masters in 1988, the first major tournament in the Middle East. The following year it was renamed to Dubai Classic, and it became the first ranking event in the Middle East. During its tenure in Dubai, the tournament was played at the multi-purpose stadium of the Al-Nasr Sports Club.

Later the event was moved to Thailand and renamed to Thailand Classic for 1995/96 and Asian Classic for 1996/97, before being dropped from the calendar.

== Winners ==
Year	Winner	Runner-up	Final score	Season
Dubai Masters (non-ranking)
1988	(England) Neal Foulds	(England) Steve Davis	5–4	1988/89
Dubai Classic (ranking)
1989	(Scotland) Stephen Hendry	(Wales) Doug Mountjoy	9–2	1989/90
1990	(Scotland) Stephen Hendry	(England) Steve Davis	9–1	1990/91
1991	(England) John Parrott	(England) Tony Knowles	9–3	1991/92
1992	(England) John Parrott	(Scotland) Stephen Hendry	9–8	1992/93
1993	(Scotland) Stephen Hendry	(England) Steve Davis	9–3	1993/94
1994	(Scotland) Alan McManus	(England) Peter Ebdon	9–6	1994/95
Thailand Classic (ranking)
1995	(England) John Parrott	(England) Nigel Bond	9–6	1995/96
Asian Classic (ranking)
1996	(England) Ronnie O'Sullivan	(England) Brian Morgan	9–8	1996/97

== See also ==
- Bahrain Championship
- Saudi Arabia Masters
- Thailand Masters
