= 1988 New Zealand Masters =

New Zealand Masters
Tournament information
- Dates: 23–26 May 1988
- Venue: New Zealand Parliament
- City: Wellington
- Country: New Zealand
- Organisation: WPBSA
- Format: Non-ranking event
- Total prize fund: £40,000
- Winner's share: £12,500
- Highest break: Joe Johnson (ENG) (113)

Final
- Champion: (Scotland) Stephen Hendry
- Runner-up: (England) Mike Hallett
- Score: 6–1

The 1988 Lion Brown New Zealand Masters was a professional invitational snooker tournament which took place between 23 and 26 May 1988 at the Legislative Chamber of the New Zealand Parliament in Wellington, New Zealand.

Stephen Hendry won the tournament beating Mike Hallett 6–1 in the final.

== Main draw ==
Quarter-finals; Best of 9 frames
(Scotland) Stephen Hendry	5
(Wales) Darren Morgan	2
(England) Joe Johnson	5
(England) Dean Reynolds	4
(England) Mike Hallett	5
(New Zealand) Dene O'Kane	1
(England) Tony Knowles	5
(Australia) Warren King	4

Semi-finals; Best of 9 frames
(Scotland) Stephen Hendry	5
(England) Joe Johnson	2
(England) Mike Hallett	5
(England) Tony Knowles	3

Final; Best of 11 frames
(Scotland) Stephen Hendry	6
(England) Mike Hallett	1

- Third place match: (England) Joe Johnson 5–4 Tony Knowles (England)
