= 1986 Malaysian Masters =

Malaysian Masters
Tournament information
- Dates: 28–30 August 1986
- Venue: Putra World Trade Centre
- City: Kuala Lumpur
- Country: Malaysia
- Organisation: WPBSA
- Format: Non-ranking event

Final
- Champion: (England) Jimmy White
- Runner-up: (Northern Ireland) Dennis Taylor
- Score: 2–1

The 1986 Camus Malaysian Masters was a professional non-ranking snooker tournament, which took place between 28 and 30 August 1986 at the Putra World Trade Centre in Kuala Lumpur, Malaysia.

10 players competed, consisting of 7 professionals and 3 amateurs. Jimmy White won the tournament, defeating Dennis Taylor 2–1 in the final.

== Results ==
First Round (Best of 3 frames)
(England) Neal Foulds	2–0	(Singapore) Lim Koon Guan
(England) Tony Meo	2–0	(Malaysia) Chin Su Liang

Quarter-finals; Best of 3 frames
(England) Jimmy White	2
(Malaysia) Yue Swee Kat	0
(England) Willie Thorne	2
(Wales) Terry Griffiths	0
(Northern Ireland) Dennis Taylor	2
(England) Neal Foulds	0
(England) Steve Davis	2
(England) Tony Meo	0

Semi-finals; Best of 3 frames
(England) Jimmy White	2
(England) Willie Thorne	1
(Northern Ireland) Dennis Taylor	2
(England) Steve Davis	1

Final; Best of 3 frames
(England) Jimmy White	2
(Northern Ireland) Dennis Taylor	1
