= 1989 Matchroom League =

Matchroom League
Tournament information
- Dates: 16 January – 14 May 1989
- Organisation: Matchroom Sport
- Format: Non-ranking event
- Total prize fund: £220,000
- Winner's share: £70,000
- Highest break: Cliff Thorburn (CAN) (147)

Final
- Champion: (England) Steve Davis
- Runner-up: (England) John Parrott
- Score: Round-Robin

The 1989 Matchroom League was a professional non-ranking snooker tournament that was played from 16 January to 14 May 1989. It featured ten players with seven from the Matchroom stable minus Dennis Taylor which he got relegated the previous year. He and fellow relegated player Joe Johnson were replaced by Alex Higgins and John Parrott who plays alongside Stephen Hendry as the non Matchroom players. Matches were played mostly around sports and leisure centres and town halls across the UK and overseas countries with matches played in Iceland, Belgium, Netherlands, Finland, Monaco and France.

Steve Davis topped the table and won the tournament for the third year in running. Cliff Thorburn recorded a maximum break in his match against Jimmy White at Crawley and become the first player to have made two maximum breaks in competition.

== Prize fund ==
The breakdown of prize money for this year is shown below:

- Winner: £70,000
- Runner-up: £30,000
- 3rd place: £25,000
- 4th place: £20,000
- 5th Place: £17,000
- 6th Place: £15,000
- 7th Place: £13,000
- 8th Place: £11,000
- 9th Place: £9,000
- 10th Place: £5,000
- Highest break: £5,000
- Total: £220,000

== League phase ==
Ranking		(England) DAV	(England) PAR	(Scotland) HEN	(Canada) THO	(England) WHI	(England) MEO	(England) FOU	(England) THO	(Wales) GRI	(Northern Ireland) HIG	Frame W-L	Match W-D-L	Pld-Pts
Winner	Steve Davis	x	5	5	6	2	6	5	7	7	5	48–24	8–0–1	9–24
Runner-up	John Parrott	3	x	3	7	4	6	5	5	5	7	45–27	6–1–2	9–19
3	Stephen Hendry	3	5	x	3	6	5	4	5	6	5	42–30	6–1–2	9–19
4	Cliff Thorburn	2	1	5	x	7	4	5	5	3	5	37–35	5–1–3	9–16
5	Jimmy White	6	4	2	1	x	3	1	4	5	5	31–41	3–2–4	9–11
6	Tony Meo	2	2	3	4	5	x	4	4	5	4	33–39	2–4–3	9–10
7	Neal Foulds	3	3	4	3	7	4	x	4	2	5	35–37	2–3–4	9–9
8	Willie Thorne	1	3	3	3	4	4	4	x	5	5	32–40	2–3–4	9–9
9	Terry Griffiths	1	3	2	5	3	3	6	3	x	5	31–41	3–0–6	9–9
10	Alex Higgins	3	1	3	3	3	4	3	3	3	x	26–46	0–1–8	9–1

If points were level then match wins, followed by most frames won determined their positions. If two players had an identical record then the result in their match determined their positions. If that ended 4–4 then the player who got to four first was higher.

- 16 January – Dolphin Centre, Darlington
  - John Parrott 5–3 Terry Griffiths
- 17 January – The Iceland Hotel, Reykjavík
  - Steve Davis 5–3 Neal Foulds
- 19 January – Queensway Hall, Dunstable
  - Cliff Thorburn 5–3 Stephen Hendry
- 20 January – Warwick University
  - Willie Thorne 4–4 Jimmy White
- 21 January – Torbay Lesuire Centre, Paignton
  - Tony Meo 4–4 Cliff Thorburn, Thorburn replaced Higgins
- 6 March –Spa Grand Hall, Scarborough
  - Tony Meo 5–3 Terry Griffiths
- 7 March – Stoke Rochford Hall, near Grantham
  - John Parrott 5–3 Willie Thorne
- 8 March – Hawth Theatre, Crawley
  - Cliff Thorburn 7–1 Jimmy White
- 9 March – Watford Leisure Centre, Watford
  - John Parrott 5–3 Neal Foulds
- 10 March – Aston Villa Sports and Leisure Centre, Birmingham
  - Jimmy White 5–3 Alex Higgins
- 11 March – Central Hall, York
  - Jimmy White 5–3 Terry Griffiths
- 12 March – The Dome, Kelham Hall, Newark
  - Neal Foulds 4–4 Willie Thorne
- 12 March – Greenhills Sports Centre, Drogheda
  - Cliff Thorburn 5–3 Alex Higgins
- 13 March – Civic Theatre, Barnsley
  - John Parrott 6–2 Tony Meo
- 14 March – Swansea Leisure Centre, Swansea
  - Steve Davis 6–2 Tony Meo
- 15 March – Rhydycar Leisure Centre, Merthyr Tydfil
  - Willie Thorne 5–3 Terry Griffiths
- 16 March – Hereford Leisure Centre, Hereford
  - Neal Foulds 4–4 Stephen Hendry
- 18 March – Perdiswell Sports Centre, Worcester
  - Steve Davis 7–1 Willie Thorne
- 19 March – Fairfield Halls, Croydon
  - Stephen Hendry 5–3 John Parrott
- 19 March – Ostend Casino, Ostend
  - Neal Foulds 7–1 Jimmy White
- 23 March – Dundonald Ice Bowl, Dundonald, Belfast
  - Willie Thorne 5–3 Alex Higgins
- 25 March – Sands Centre, Carlisle
  - Steve Davis 5–3 Stephen Hendry
- 27 March – Crowtree Leisure Centre, Sunderland
  - Steve Davis 6–2 Cliff Thorburn
- 27 March – Amsterdam
  - Stephen Hendry 5–3 Tony Meo
- 3 April – Stantonbury Leisure Centre, Milton Keynes
  - Neal Foulds 4–4 Tony Meo
- 4 April – North Bridge Leisure Centre, Halifax
  - Tony Meo 5–3 Jimmy White
- 5 April – Howebridge Leisure Centre, Wigan
  - Steve Davis 5–3 John Parrott
- 6 April – Thornaby Pavilion, Thornaby-on-Tees
  - Neal Foulds 5–3 Alex Higgins
- 7 April – Mansfield Leisure Centre, Mansfield
  - John Parrott 7–1 Alex Higgins
- 7 April – Turku
  - Terry Griffiths 5–3 Cliff Thorburn
- 8 April – New Victoria Theatre, Newcastle-under-Lyme
  - Stephen Hendry 5–3 Willie Thorne
- 9 April – Harrogate International Centre, Harrogate
  - Stephen Hendry 5–3 Alex Higgins
- 9 April – Beach Plaza Hotel, Monte Carlo
  - Steve Davis 7–1 Terry Griffiths
- 10 April – Municipal Hall, Colne
  - Cliff Thorburn 5–3 Neal Foulds
- 4 May – Northcroft Recreation Centre, Newbury
  - Alex Higgins 4–4 Tony Meo
- 5 May – Bath Sports and Leisure centre, Bath
  - John Parrott 4–4 Jimmy White
- 6 May – Granby Halls Leisure Centre, Leicester
  - Stephen Hendry 6–2 Jimmy White
- 7 May – Towngate Theatre, Poole Arts Centre, Poole
  - Stephen Hendry 6–2 Terry Griffiths
- 8 May – St David's Hall, Cardiff
  - Terry Griffiths 5–3 Alex Higgins
- 9 May – Meadowside Centre, Burton upon Trent
  - Cliff Thorburn 5–3 Willie Thorne
- 11 May – Royal Centre, Nottingham
  - Steve Davis 5–3 Alex Higgins
- 11 May – Mulhouse
  - Tony Meo 4–4 Willie Thorne
- 13 May – Norwich Sports Village, Norwich
  - Terry Griffiths 6–2 Neal Foulds
- 13 May – Marseille
  - John Parrott 7–1 Cliff Thorburn
- 14 May – Brentwood International Centre, Brentwood
  - Jimmy White 6–2 Steve Davis
