= 1987 Pontins Professional =

Tournament information
- Dates: 9–16 May 1987
- Venue: Pontin's
- City: Prestatyn
- Country: Wales
- Organisation: WPBSA
- Format: Non-Ranking event

Final
- Champion: (England) Neal Foulds
- Runner-up: (England) Willie Thorne
- Score: 9–8

The 1987 Pontins Professional was the fourteenth edition of the professional invitational snooker tournament which took place between 9 and 16 May 1987 at Pontin's in Prestatyn, Wales.

The tournament featured eight professional players. The quarter-final matches were contested over the best of 9 frames, the semi-final matches over the best of 11 frames, and the final over the best of 17 frames.

Neal Foulds won the event for the first time, beating Willie Thorne 9–8 in the final.

== Main draw ==
Quarter-finals; Best of 9 frames
(England) Neal Foulds	5
(England) John Virgo	1
(Wales) Terry Griffiths	5
(Wales) Cliff Wilson	1
(England) Willie Thorne	5
(Scotland) Stephen Hendry	3
(England) John Parrott	5
(Malta) Tony Drago	0

Semi-finals; Best of 11 frames
(England) Neal Foulds	6
(Wales) Terry Griffiths	4
(England) Willie Thorne	6
(England) John Parrott	3

Final; Best of 17 frames
(England) Neal Foulds	9
(England) Willie Thorne	8
