= 1988 Hong Kong Masters =

Invitational snooker tournament

Hong Kong Masters
Tournament information
- Dates: August 1988
- Venue: Queen Elizabeth Stadium
- Country: Hong Kong
- Organisation: Matchroom Sport and WPBSA
- Format: Non-ranking event
- Highest break: Jimmy White (ENG) 118

Final
- Champion: Jimmy White (ENG)
- Runner-up: Neal Foulds (ENG)
- Score: 6–3

The 1988 Hong Kong Masters was a professional non-ranking snooker tournament held in August 1988 at the Queen Elizabeth Stadium in Hong Kong. Eight professional players and eight local amateur players participated. Jimmy White won the title, defeating Neal Foulds 6–3 in the final.

The highest break of the tournament was 118 by Jimmy White.

== Prize Fund ==
The tournament was sponsored by UK industrial group Lep. Prize money was awarded as follows:

- Winner: £28,751
- Runner-up: £10,714
- Semi-final: £7,143
- Quarter-final: £3,571
- Highest break: £2,714

== Main draw ==
First round Best of 5 frames
Steve Davis (ENG)	3
M. Tak Man (HKG)	0
Neal Foulds (ENG)	3
Franky Chan (HKG)	0
Willie Thorne (ENG)	3
Kenny Kwok (HKG)	2
Tony Meo (ENG)	3
Sunny Tong (HKG)	2
John Parrott (ENG)	3
Lam Hong Man (HKG)	0
Dennis Taylor (NIR)	3
Ivan Li (HKG)	0
Terry Griffiths (WAL)	3
Chan Chor Kwan (HKG)	0
Jimmy White (ENG)	3
Pong Sut Ming (HKG)	1

Quarter-finals; Best of 5 frames
Steve Davis (ENG)	2
Neal Foulds (ENG)	3
Willie Thorne (ENG)	3
Tony Meo (ENG)	0
John Parrott (ENG)	1
Dennis Taylor (NIR)	3
Terry Griffiths (WAL)	1
Jimmy White (ENG)	3

Semi-finals; Best of 9 frames
Neal Foulds (ENG)	5
Willie Thorne (ENG)	4
Dennis Taylor (NIR)	2
Jimmy White (ENG)	5

Final; Best of 11 frames
Neal Foulds (ENG)	3
Jimmy White (ENG)	6
