= 1986 Matchroom Professional Championship =

Tournament information
- Dates: 17–21 September 1986
- Venue: Cliffs Pavilion
- City: Southend-on-Sea
- Country: England
- Organisation: Matchroom Sport
- Format: Non-ranking event
- Total prize fund: £100,000
- Winner's share: £50,000
- Highest break: Willie Thorne (ENG) (137)

Final
- Champion: Willie Thorne (ENG)
- Runner-up: Steve Davis (ENG)
- Score: 10–9

The 1986 Matchroom Professional Championship was the inaugural edition of the professional invitational snooker tournament which took place from 17 to 21 September 1986 in Southend-on-Sea, England.

The tournament featured six professional players, all part of Barry Hearn's Matchroom Sport stable. The tournament was won by Willie Thorne, who defeated Steve Davis 10–9 in the final. Thorne made a break of 137 in his opening match against Neal Foulds. The event was played at the same time as the 1986 Scottish Masters.

== Prize fund ==
The breakdown of prize money for this year is shown below:

- Winner: £50,000
- Runner-up: £20,000
- Semi-final: £10,000
- Quarter-final: £5,000
- Total: £100,000

== Tournament draw ==
Quarter-finals; Best of 11 frames
Terry Griffiths (WAL)	6
Tony Meo (ENG)	3
Willie Thorne (ENG)	6
Neal Foulds (ENG)	3

Semi-finals; Best of 11 frames
Steve Davis (ENG)	6
(Wales) Terry Griffiths	3
Dennis Taylor (NIR)	5
(England) Willie Thorne	6

Final; Best of 19 Frames
(England) Willie Thorne	10
(England) Steve Davis	9
