= 1987 Matchroom League =

Rothmans Matchroom League
Tournament information
- Dates: 17 January – 17 May 1987
- Organisation: Matchroom Sport
- Format: Non-ranking event
- Winner's share: £53,600

Final
- Champion: (England) Steve Davis
- Runner-up: (England) Neal Foulds
- Score: Round-Robin

The 1987 Rothmans Matchroom League was a professional non-ranking snooker tournament that was played from January to May 1987. It featured the seven players under contract from Barry Hearn's Matchroom stable which were Steve Davis, Dennis Taylor, Terry Griffiths, Willie Thorne, Tony Meo, Jimmy White and Neal Foulds along with invited player Cliff Thorburn. Matches were played mostly around sports and leisure centres and town halls across the UK.

Steve Davis topped the table and won the tournament.

== League phase ==
Ranking		(England) DAV	(England) FOU	(Wales) GRI	(Northern Ireland) TAY	(England) WHI	(England) MEO	(Canada) THO	(England) THO	Frame W-L	Match W-D-L	Pld-Pts
Winner	Steve Davis	x	6	4	6	3	7	3	7	36–20	4–1–2	7–13
Runner-up	Neal Foulds	2	x	4	5	6	4	6	4	31–25	3–3–1	7–12
3	Jimmy White	5	2	6	5	x	1	4	4	27–29	3–2–2	7–11
4	Terry Griffiths	4	4	x	4	2	5	6	3	28–28	2–3–2	7–9
5	Dennis Taylor	2	3	4	x	3	7	5	4	28–28	2–2–3	7–8
6	Tony Meo	1	4	3	1	7	x	4	6	26–30	2–2–3	7–8
7	Cliff Thorburn	5	2	2	3	4	4	x	5	25–31	2–2–3	7–8
8	Willie Thorne	1	4	5	4	4	2	3	x	23–33	1–3–3	7–6

The table points were decided by frame wins, followed by match wins to determine players' positions. If two players had an identical record then the result in their match determined their positions. If that ended 4–4 then the player who got to four first was higher.

- 17 January – Torbay Leisure Centre
  - Dennis Taylor 4–4 Terry Griffiths
  - Steve Davis 7–1 Willie Thorne
- 18 January – St David's Hall, Cardiff
  - Dennis Taylor 7–1 Tony Meo
  - Steve Davis 4–4 Terry Griffiths
- 24 January – Central Hall, York
  - Terry Griffiths 5–3 Tony Meo
  - Jimmy White 5–3 Dennis Taylor
- 14 February – Granby Halls Leisure Centre, Leicester
  - Neal Foulds 6–2 Cliff Thorburn
  - Willie Thorne 4–4 Jimmy White
- 14 March – Woodford Leisure Centre, Kingston-upon-Hull
  - Neal Foulds 4–4 Terry Griffiths
  - Steve Davis 7–1 Tony Meo
- 15 March – Mansfield Leisure Centre
  - Willie Thorne 5–3 Terry Griffiths
  - Steve Davis 6–2 Neal Foulds
- 4 April – Brighton Centre
  - Cliff Thorburn 5–3 Willie Thorne
  - Steve Davis 6–2 Dennis Taylor
- 5 April – Derngate, Northampton
  - Neal Foulds 5–3 Dennis Taylor
  - Cliff Thorburn 5–3 Steve Davis
- 11 April – Richard Dunn Sports Centre, Bradford
  - Neal Foulds 4–4 Willie Thorne
  - Tony Meo 7–1 Jimmy White
- 12 April – Fairfield Halls, Croydon
  - Jimmy White 6–2 Terry Griffiths
  - Dennis Taylor 5–3 Cliff Thorburn
- 9 May – Gloucester Leisure Centre
  - Tony Meo 6–2 Willie Thorne
  - Cliff Thorburn 4–4 Jimmy White
- 10 May – Assembly Rooms, Derby
  - Terry Griffiths 6–2 Cliff Thorburn
  - Jimmy White 5–3 Steve Davis
- 16 May – Cleethorpes Leisure Centre
  - 'Tony Meo 4–4 Cliff Thorburn
  - Neal Foulds 6–2 Jimmy White
- 17 May – Everton Park Sports Centre, Liverpool
  - Neal Foulds 4–4 Tony Meo
  - Dennis Taylor 4–4 Willie Thorne
