= 1988 Norwich Union Grand Prix =

Norwich Union Grand Prix
Tournament information
- Dates: 17 September – 18 December 1988
- Venue: Beach Plaza Hotel
- City: Group stage: Brussels, Paris, Madrid, Milan; Final: Monte Carlo
- Country: Group stage: Belgium, France, Spain, Italy; Final: Monaco
- Organisation: WPBSA
- Format: Non-ranking event
- Total prize fund: £150,000
- Winner's share: £50,000
- Highest break: Steve Davis (ENG) (136)

Final
- Champion: (England) Steve Davis
- Runner-up: (England) Jimmy White
- Score: 5–4

The 1988 Norwich Union Grand Prix was a professional invitational snooker tournament, which took place between 17 September and 18 December 1988.

The tournament consisted of four legs featuring four players in each; these legs were played in Brussels, Paris, Madrid and Milan. The winner of these legs went to the semi-finals of the final tournament held at the Beach Plaza Hotel in Monte Carlo, Monaco. Steve Davis won the final tournament beating Jimmy White 5–4 in the final.

== Main draw ==
=== Group Stage 1 ===
Semi-finals; Best of 5 frames
(Northern Ireland) Dennis Taylor	3
(Canada) Cliff Thorburn	0
(England) Willie Thorne	3
(England) Jimmy White	0

Final; Best of 9 frames
(Northern Ireland) Dennis Taylor	5
(England) Willie Thorne	1

=== Group Stage 2 ===
Semi-finals; Best of 5 frames
(England) Steve Davis	3
(Wales) Terry Griffiths	0
(England) Neal Foulds	3
(England) Tony Meo	0

Final; Best of 9 frames
(England) Steve Davis	5
(England) Neal Foulds	3

=== Group Stage 3 ===
Semi-finals; Best of 5 frames
(England) Willie Thorne	3
(England) Neal Foulds	1
(England) Jimmy White	3
(Canada) Cliff Thorburn	1

Final; Best of 9 frames
(England) Jimmy White	5
(England) Willie Thorne	3

=== Group Stage 4 ===
Semi-finals; Best of 5 frames
(England) Steve Davis	3
(England) Tony Meo	1
(Wales) Terry Griffiths	3
(England) Willie Thorne	0

Final; Best of 9 frames
(Wales) Terry Griffiths	5
(England) Steve Davis	4

=== Final ===
Semi-finals; Best of 5 frames
(England) Steve Davis	3
(Northern Ireland) Dennis Taylor	1
(England) Jimmy White	3
(Wales) Terry Griffiths	1

Final; Best of 9 frames
(England) Steve Davis	5
(England) Jimmy White	4
