= 1986 Hong Kong Masters =

Hong Kong Masters
Tournament information
- Dates: 2–7 September 1986
- Venue: Queen Elizabeth Stadium
- Country: Hong Kong
- Organisation: WPBSA
- Format: Non-ranking event
- Total prize fund: £86,000

Final
- Champion: (England) Willie Thorne
- Runner-up: (Northern Ireland) Dennis Taylor
- Score: 8–3

The 1986 Hong Kong Masters was a professional non-ranking snooker tournament that took place between 2 and 7 September 1986 at the Queen Elizabeth Stadium in Hong Kong. Willie Thorne won the tournament, defeating Dennis Taylor 8–3 in the final. Thorne recorded two century breaks, 102 and 106, during the final. The event was sponsored by Camus and had a prize fund of £86,000.

== Main draw ==
First round and quarter-finals source: Hayton and Dee (2004); Semi-finals and final source: Hale (1987)

First Round (Best of 5 frames)
(England) Neal Foulds	3–0	(Hong Kong) Franky Chan
(England) Tony Meo	3–0	(Hong Kong) Stanley Leung

Quarter-finals; Best of 5 frames		Semi-finals; Best of 9 frames		Final; Best of 15 frames
(Wales) Terry Griffiths	3
(England) Neal Foulds	2	(Wales) Terry Griffiths	4
(Northern Ireland) Dennis Taylor	3	(Northern Ireland) Dennis Taylor	5
(England) Jimmy White	1			(Northern Ireland) Dennis Taylor	3
(Canada) Cliff Thorburn	0			(England) Willie Thorne	8
(England) Willie Thorne	3	(England) Willie Thorne	5
(England) Steve Davis	3	(England) Steve Davis	2
(England) Tony Meo	0
