= 1986 Canadian Masters =

Canadian Masters
Tournament information
- Dates: 28 October – 1 November 1986
- Venue: CBC Television Studios
- City: Toronto
- Country: Canada
- Organisation: WPBSA
- Format: Non-ranking event
- Total prize fund: £62,500
- Winner's share: £18,750
- Highest break: Steve Davis (ENG) (143)

Final
- Champion: (England) Steve Davis
- Runner-up: (England) Willie Thorne
- Score: 9–3

The 1986 BCE Canadian Masters was a professional non-ranking snooker tournament that took place between 28 October–1 November 1986 at the CBC Television Studios in Toronto, Canada.

Steve Davis won the tournament by defeating Willie Thorne 9–3 in the final.

== Main draw ==
Quarter-finals; Best of 9 Frames
(England) Steve Davis	5
(England) Jimmy White	2
(Northern Ireland) Alex Higgins	5
(England) Joe Johnson	3
(England) Willie Thorne	5
(Northern Ireland) Dennis Taylor	4
(England) Tony Knowles	5
(Canada) Cliff Thorburn	1

Semi-finals; Best of 15 Frames
(England) Steve Davis	8
(Northern Ireland) Alex Higgins	2
(England) Willie Thorne	8
(England) Tony Knowles	7

Final; Best of 17 Frames
(England) Steve Davis	9
(England) Willie Thorne	3
