= 1987 Kent Cup =

Kent Cup
Tournament information
- Dates: 5–8 March 1987
- City: Beijing
- Country: China
- Organisation: Matchroom Sport and WPBSA
- Format: Non-ranking event
- Highest break: 134, Steve Davis

Final
- Champion: Willie Thorne (ENG)
- Runner-up: Jimmy White (ENG)
- Score: 5–2

The 1987 Kent Cup was an invitational non-ranking snooker tournament held in Beijing from 5 to 8 March 1987. The invited competitors were seven players managed by Barry Hearn's Matchroom Sport, and also Rex Williams and eight Chinese amateur players. Willie Thorne won the tournament, defeating Jimmy White 5–2 in the final, which was watched by over 100 million television viewers in China.

The highest break was 134, by Steve Davis.

== Main draw ==
Quarter-finals; Best of 7 frames
(England) Steve Davis	4
(England) Rex Williams	0
(England) Willie Thorne	4
(Wales) Terry Griffiths	1
(England) Jimmy White	4
(England) Tony Meo	0
(Northern Ireland) Dennis Taylor	1
(England) Neal Foulds	4

Semi-finals; Best of 7 frames
(England) Steve Davis	3
(England) Willie Thorne	4
(England) Jimmy White	4
(England) Neal Foulds	3

Final; Best of 9 frames
(England) Willie Thorne	5
(England) Jimmy White	2
