= 1988 Grand Prix (snooker) =

Rothmans Grand Prix
Tournament information
- Dates: 10–23 October 1988
- Venue: Hexagon Theatre
- City: Reading
- Country: England
- Organisation: WPBSA
- Format: Ranking event
- Total prize fund: £325,000
- Winner's share: £65,000
- Highest break: Dean Reynolds (ENG) (139)

Final
- Champion: Steve Davis (ENG)
- Runner-up: Alex Higgins (NIR)
- Score: 10–6

The 1988 Rothmans Grand Prix was a professional ranking snooker tournament held at the Hexagon Theatre in Reading, England.

Steve Davis won in the final 10–6 against Alex Higgins. It was Higgins first ranking event final since the 1984 UK Championship when he also lost to Davis.

== Main draw ==
Last 64; Best of 9 frames
(Scotland) Stephen Hendry	5
(England) Ian Williamson	2
(Wales) Doug Mountjoy	5
(England) Mick Fisher	1
(Canada) Alain Robidoux	5
(England) John Virgo	1
(England) Tony Meo	5
(Canada) Kirk Stevens	3
(England) Nigel Gilbert	5
(South Africa) Silvino Francisco	4
(Australia) Eddie Charlton	5
(England) Pat Houlihan	3
(England) Tony Knowles	5
(Northern Ireland) Joe O'Boye	4
(England) Dean Reynolds	5
(England) Les Dodd	3
(England) John Parrott	5
(Canada) Mario Morra	3
(England) Ray Edmonds	5
(England) Steve Longworth	3
(England) Gary Wilkinson	5
(England) Willie Thorne	3
(England) Rex Williams	5
(England) Paul Medati	2
(Northern Ireland) Alex Higgins	5
(England) David Roe	4
(New Zealand) Dene O'Kane	5
(England) David Gilbert	4
(England) Neal Foulds	5
(England) Nick Terry	4
(England) Steve Duggan	5
(England) David Taylor	1
(England) Jimmy White	5
(England) Danny Fowler	0
(Wales) Wayne Jones	5
(Australia) John Campbell	2
(Northern Ireland) Jack McLaughlin	5
(South Africa) Peter Francisco	2
(England) John Spencer	5
(England) Mark Johnston-Allen	3
(Northern Ireland) Dennis Taylor	5
(South Africa) Francois Ellis	1
(Canada) Bob Chaperon	5
(England) Dave Martin	0
(England) Mike Hallett	5
(England) Tony Jones	2
(England) Steve James	5
(Scotland) Matt Smith	3
(Wales) Terry Griffiths	5
(England) Mike Watterson	3
(England) Barry West	5
(England) Jim Chambers	3
(England) Joe Johnson	5
(England) Malcolm Bradley	2
(Republic of Ireland) Eugene Hughes	5
(England) Martin Clark	3
(Wales) Cliff Wilson	5
(Wales) Tony Chappel	2
(Malta) Tony Drago	5
(Australia) Robby Foldvari	3
(England) Steve Davis	w/o
(Canada) Bill Werbeniuk	w/d
(Wales) Steve Newbury	5
(Scotland) Murdo MacLeod	3

Last 32; Best of 9 frames
(Scotland) Stephen Hendry	1
(Wales) Doug Mountjoy	5
(Canada) Alain Robidoux	5
(England) Tony Meo	0
(England) Nigel Gilbert	5
(Australia) Eddie Charlton	0
(England) Tony Knowles	5
(England) Dean Reynolds	3
(England) John Parrott	3
(England) Ray Edmonds	5
(England) Gary Wilkinson	2
(England) Rex Williams	5
(Northern Ireland) Alex Higgins	5
(New Zealand) Dene O'Kane	0
(England) Neal Foulds	5
(England) Steve Duggan	4
(England) Jimmy White	5
(Wales) Wayne Jones	1
(Northern Ireland) Jack McLaughlin	5
(England) John Spencer	3
(Northern Ireland) Dennis Taylor	5
(Canada) Bob Chaperon	4
(England) Mike Hallett	5
(England) Steve James	2
(Wales) Terry Griffiths	5
(England) Barry West	1
(England) Joe Johnson	2
(Republic of Ireland) Eugene Hughes	5
(Wales) Cliff Wilson	5
(Malta) Tony Drago	4
(England) Steve Davis	5
(Wales) Steve Newbury	1

Last 16; Best of 9 frames
(Wales) Doug Mountjoy	4
(Canada) Alain Robidoux	5
(England) Nigel Gilbert	5
(England) Tony Knowles	4
(England) Ray Edmonds	3
(England) Rex Williams	5
(Northern Ireland) Alex Higgins	5
(England) Neal Foulds	3
(England) Jimmy White	5
(Northern Ireland) Jack McLaughlin	2
(Northern Ireland) Dennis Taylor	5
(England) Mike Hallett	2
(Wales) Terry Griffiths	5
(Republic of Ireland) Eugene Hughes	2
(Wales) Cliff Wilson	1
(England) Steve Davis	5

Quarter-finals; Best of 9 frames
(Canada) Alain Robidoux	5
(England) Nigel Gilbert	4
(England) Rex Williams	4
(Northern Ireland) Alex Higgins	5
(England) Jimmy White	2
(Northern Ireland) Dennis Taylor	5
(Wales) Terry Griffiths	3
(England) Steve Davis	5

Semi-finals; Best of 17 frames
(Canada) Alain Robidoux	7
(Northern Ireland) Alex Higgins	9
(Northern Ireland) Dennis Taylor	1
(England) Steve Davis	9

Final; Best of 19 frames
(Northern Ireland) Alex Higgins	6
(England) Steve Davis	10

== Final ==
Final: Best of 19 frames. Referee: Alan Chamberlain; Hexagon Theatre, Reading, England, 23 October 1988.
Steve Davis; England	10–6	Alex Higgins; Northern Ireland
137–0 (137), 69–37, 77–34, 46–75, 71–19, 0–97 (82), 56–39, 76–17 (64), 106–4 (64), 26–64 (57), 44–52, 75–30, 6–90, 100–2 (51), 19–58, 70–49
137'	Highest break	82
1	Century breaks	0
3	50+ breaks	2

== Century breaks ==
- 139, 103 – Dean Reynolds
- 138, 104 – Joe O'Boye
- 137 – Steve Davis
- 134 – Robby Foldvari
- 133, 132 – Dave Martin
- 122 – Tony Knowles
- 116 – Terry Griffiths
- 113 – John Spencer
- 115 – Les Dodd
- 114 – Ian Williamson
- 111 – Jimmy White
- 109 – Bob Chaperon
- 109 – Bill Werbeniuk
- 107 – Nigel Gilbert
- 102 – Mark Bennett
