= 1987–88 snooker world rankings =

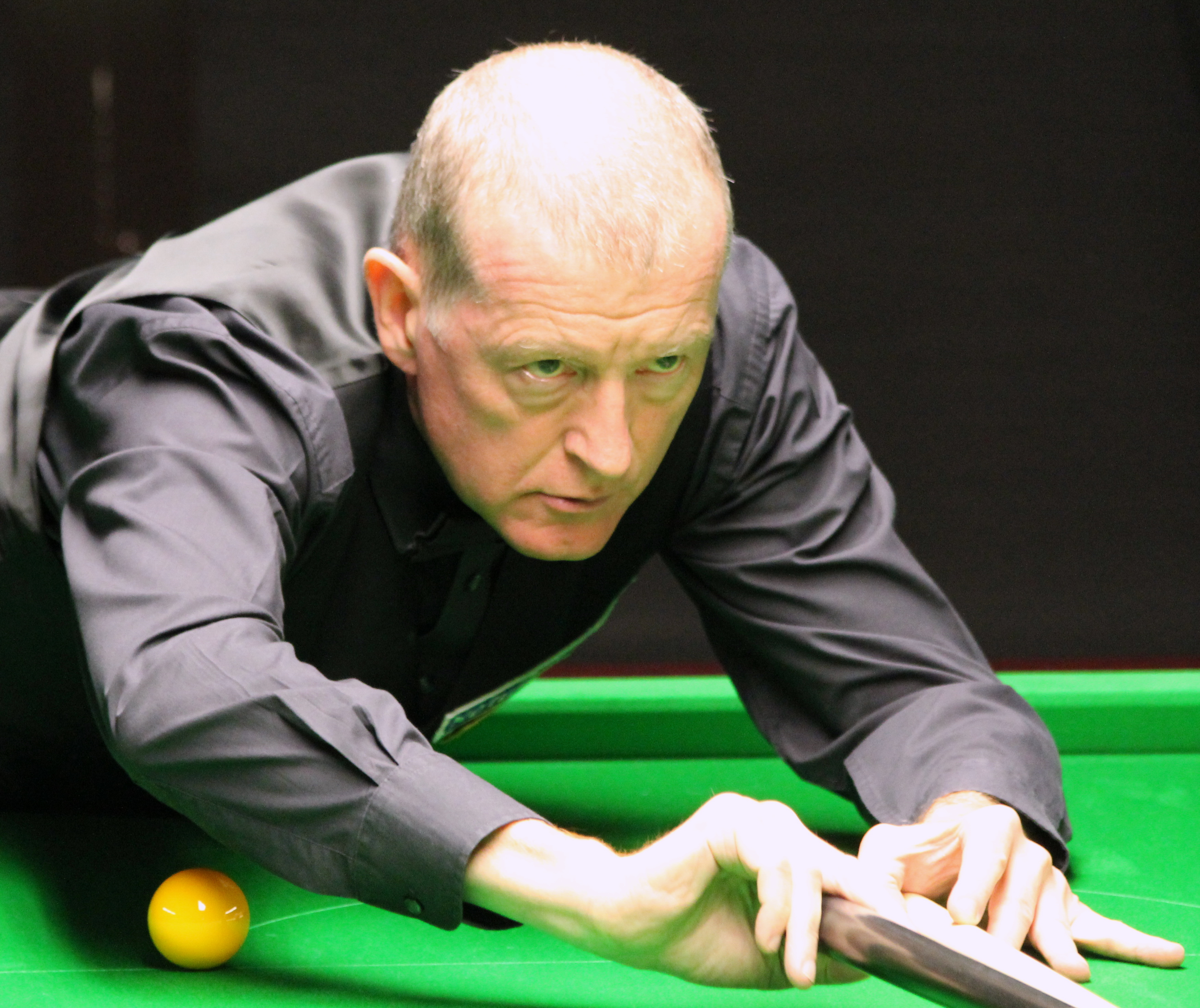
Steve Davis (pictured in 2012) was ranked in first place for the fifth consecutive year.

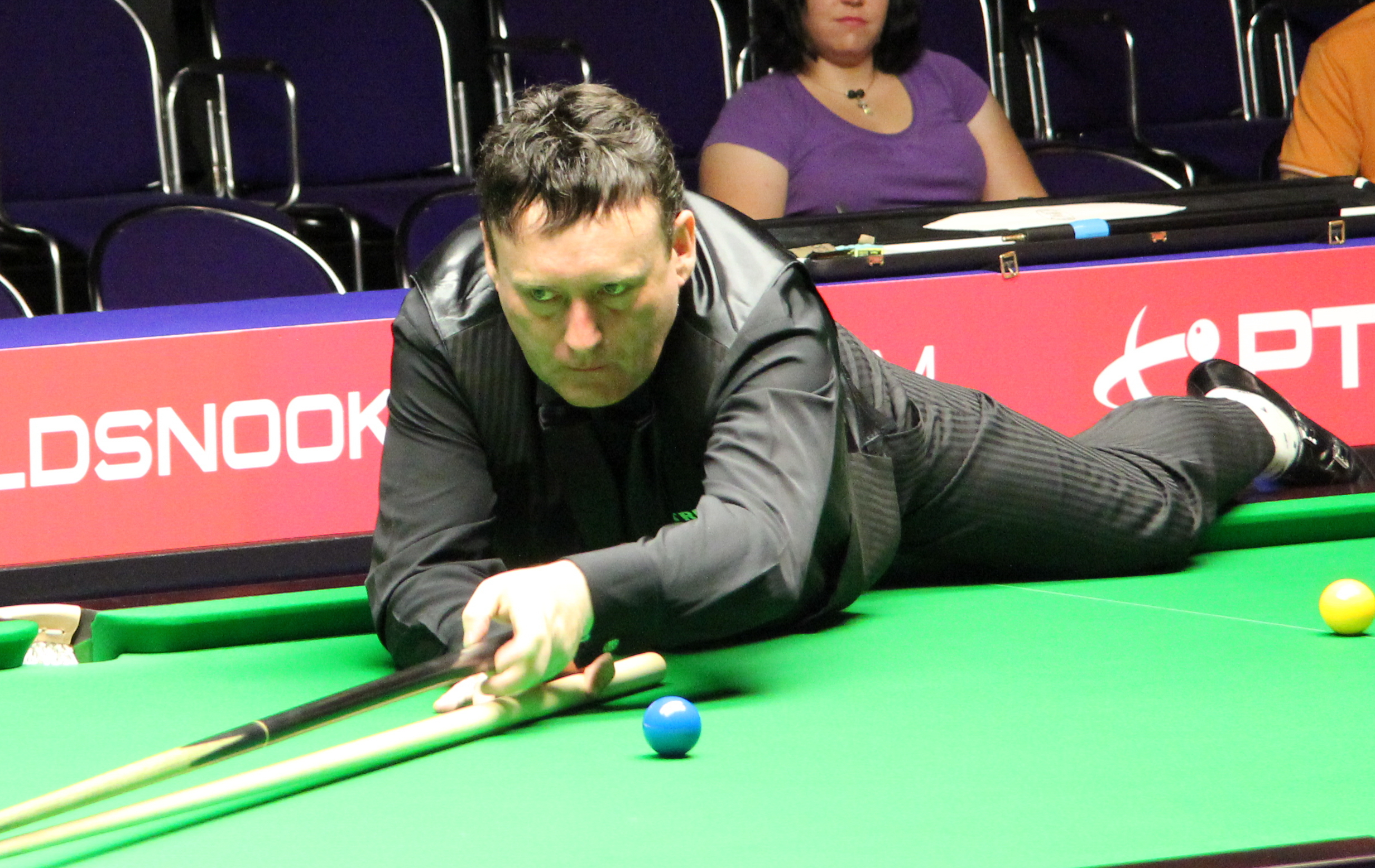
Jimmy White (pictured in 2011) moved up to second place in the rankings.

The World Professional Billiards and Snooker Association (WPBSA), the governing body for professional snooker, first introduced a ranking system for professional players in 1976, with the aim of seeding players for the World Snooker Championship. The reigning champion would be automatically seeded first, the losing finalist from the previous year seeded second, and the other seedings based on the ranking list. Initially, the rankings were based on performances in the preceding three world championships. The list for the 1986–87 snooker season was the first to only take account of results over two seasons, and the rankings for 1987–88 were also based on results from the preceding two seasons. The snooker journalist Janice Hale wrote positively about the rankings being calculated across two seasons rather than three. She argued that, at a time when snooker was the most viewed televised sport in the UK, "New faces are now beginning to appear on television".

Steve Davis retained the top ranking for the fifth consecutive year, with Jimmy White second and Neal Foulds third. White, who won two ranking titles in the 1986–87 season, had been in fifth place the previous year, and Foulds, who won one ranking title in the latter season, moved up from 13th.

Discussing the rankings for 1987–88, the snooker journalist Terry Smith asserted that "Every player in the lower ranks has one immediate aim – a place in the top 16 ... that elite top group." Players in the top 16 were seeded into the last-32 round of the 1988 World Snooker Championship and received invitations to the 1988 Masters. John Parrott, Mike Hallett and Dean Reynolds moved into the top 16 for the first time, while Kirk Stevens, Tony Meo and Ray Reardon fell out of it. Six-time world champion Reardon dropped down to 38th from 15th. Teenager Stephen Hendry rose to 23rd from 51st. Ken Owers was the highest-ranked of the players who had joined the circuit in the 1986–87 season.

In the original list for the season, Perrie Mans was listed at 50th and George Ganim at 126th. There were 130 professionals listed, of which those ranked 121 or lower became "non-tournament" (NT) players, meaning that they were permitted to enter the world championship but no other tournaments. Mans resigned his membership of the WPBSA that year. The list as published in the Benson and Hedges Snooker Yearbook in 1987 omits Mans and Ganim, and has David Greaves above François Ellis; these differences are reflected in the table used below.

== Points tariff and basis of ranking ==
Points tariff contributing to the Snooker world rankings 1987–88
Placing	1986 and 1987 world championships	Other ranking tournaments 1985–86 and 1986–87
Champion	10	6
Runner-up	8	5
Losing semi-finalist	6	4
Losing Quarter-finalist	4	3
Last 16 Loser	2	2
Last 32 Loser	1 ranking point or 2 merit points (Note: Players who qualified received a ranking point. Players exempted until this round received two merit points.)	1
Final qualifying round loser	2 merit points	1 merit point
Penultimate qualifying round loser	1 merit point	1 A point
Antepenultimate qualifying round loser	1 A point	Frames won counted
Preliminary round loser	Frames won counted	–

Ranking was determined as follows:

- By number of ranking points.
- If players had an equal number of ranking points, precedence was given to the player with the better performances in the later season.
- If players were still equal, merit points were considered. If they were still tied, precedence was given to the player with the better performances in the later season.
- If players were still equal, A points were considered. If they were still tied, precedence was given to the player with the better in the later season.
- If players were still equal, frames won were considered. If they were still tied, precedence was given the player with the better in the later season.

== Rankings ==
"(NT)" denotes a "non-tournament" player, i.e. a player who was permitted to enter the world championship but no other tournaments in 1987–88. "(New)" denotes a player that was a new professional for 1986–87.

Snooker world rankings 1987–88
Ranking	Name	1985–86 season						1986–87 season						Ranking points	Merit	A points	Frames
Ranking	Name	MT	GP	UK	Cl	BO	WC	IO	GP	UK	Cl	BO	WC	Ranking points	Merit	A points	Frames
1	Steve Davis (ENG)	3	6	6	3	6	8	3	3	6	6	1	10	61	0	0	0
2	Jimmy White (ENG)	5	2	4	6	0	4	0	6	2	5	6	6	46	2	0	0
3	Neal Foulds (ENG)	4	1	2	3	1	1	6	4	5	0	5	6	38	1	0	0
4	Cliff Thorburn (CAN)	6	4	2	5	2	6	5	0	3	1	4	0	38	3	0	0
5	Joe Johnson (ENG)	3	2	1	3	1	10	1	0	1	1	2	8	33	1	0	0
6	Terry Griffiths (WAL)	2	3	3	0	3	4	2	2	2	3	2	4	30	1	0	0
7	Tony Knowles (ENG)	1	4	3	2	1	6	2	3	3	0	4	0	29	3	0	0
8	Dennis Taylor (NIR)	4	5	4	2	0	0	2	2	1	0	3	2	25	4	0	0
9	Alex Higgins (NIR)	2	2	2	3	4	2	1	2	4	1	0	2	25	1	0	0
10	Silvino Francisco (RSA)	0	3	2	0	1	2	3	4	1	3	1	2	22	2	0	0
11	Willie Thorne (ENG)	2	0	5	0	5	4	0	2	2	0	2	0	22	6	0	0
12	Rex Williams (ENG)	0	1	2	4	2	1	2	5	0	1	2	0	20	4	0	0
13	John Parrott (ENG)	3	0	1	0	2	2	0	1	4	3	0	2	18	4	0	0
14	Doug Mountjoy (WAL)	1	1	1	4	0	2	1	2	1	0	2	2	17	2	0	0
15	Dean Reynolds (ENG)	2	0	1	1	0	1	3	0	2	4	1	1	16	3	0	0
16	Mike Hallett (ENG)	0	1	1	1	1	2	0	2	2	1	1	4	16	2	0	0
17	Cliff Wilson (WAL)	2	3	0	0	1	1	3	1	0	3	2	0	16	5	0	0
18	Peter Francisco (RSA)	0	2	1	2	2	0	4	1	1	2	1	0	16	4	1	0
19	John Virgo (ENG)	1	0	1	1	4	1	1	1	1	1	3	1	16	1	0	0
20	Tony Meo (ENG)	1	2	2	2	3	0	0	3	1	2	0	0	16	6	0	0
21	Kirk Stevens (CAN)	0	3	3	0	2	4	0	0	1	1	2	0	16	6	0	0
22	John Campbell (AUS)	2	2	1	2	2	2	0	1	0	2	0	1	15	3	0	0
23	Stephen Hendry (SCO)	0	0	0	1	0	1	1	3	0	4	0	4	14	1	3	6
24	Eugene Hughes (IRL)	0	1	0	2	0	2	4	0	2	0	1	1	13	5	0	0
25	David Taylor (ENG)	2	1	2	0	0	0	2	0	1	0	3	1	12	6	0	0
26	Eddie Charlton (AUS)	0	1	0	0	2	2	1	0	1	2	1	0	10	6	0	0
27	Dave Martin (ENG)	1	1	1	1	1	1	0	1	1	1	1	0	10	3	0	0
28	John Spencer (ENG)	1	0	1	0	0	1	0	0	2	1	3	0	9	7	0	0
29	Barry West (ENG)	0	0	3	1	0	0	1	0	0	2	1	1	9	6	0	4
30	Murdo MacLeod (SCO)	2	0	2	1	2	0	0	0	0	0	0	2	9	8	0	0
31	Steve Longworth (ENG)	0	2	0	0	1	0	0	0	2	1	0	2	8	7	1	0
32	Tony Drago (MLT)	0	2	1	0	0	0	1	1	3	0	0	0	8	2	3	6
33	Bill Werbeniuk (CAN)	1	0	0	2	3	1	0	0	0	1	0	0	8	8	0	0
34	Wayne Jones (WAL)	0	1	0	0	0	0	0	1	3	2	0	0	7	6	2	0
35	Dene O'Kane (NZL)	0	0	0	1	0	0	1	0	1	0	0	4	7	6	3	0
36	Jim Wych (CAN)	0	0	0	0	3	0	1	1	1	0	0	1	7	7	1	0
37	Steve Duggan (ENG)	3	0	0	0	0	0	1	0	0	2	1	0	7	5	3	0
38	Ray Reardon (WAL)	0	0	1	0	0	0	1	0	1	0	1	2	6	8	0	0
39	Warren King (AUS)	1	0	0	0	0	0	1	1	0	0	1	1	5	6	2	0
40	Danny Fowler (ENG)	0	1	1	0	0	1	0	0	0	2	0	0	5	7	2	0
41	Bob Chaperon (CAN)	1	0	0	0	0	0	2	1	0	0	0	0	4	7	2	0
42	Marcel Gauvreau (CAN)	0	0	0	2	0	0	2	0	0	0	0	0	4	5	6	0
43	Paddy Browne (IRL)	0	0	0	1	1	0	0	2	0	0	0	0	4	2	7	0
44	Tommy Murphy (NIR)	1	0	0	0	0	0	0	0	0	0	2	0	3	9	3	0
45	Steve Newbury (WAL)	0	0	0	0	1	0	0	2	0	0	0	0	3	9	3	0
46	Tony Jones (ENG)	0	0	0	1	0	0	0	0	1	0	1	0	3	9	1	0
47	Mark Wildman (ENG)	0	1	0	0	1	0	0	1	0	0	0	0	3	8	2	0
48	Graham Cripsey (ENG)	0	0	1	1	0	0	0	0	0	0	1	0	3	6	2	5
49	Bob Harris (ENG)	1	1	0	0	0	0	0	0	0	1	0	0	3	6	3	0
50	Jack McLaughlin (NIR)	0	0	0	0	0	0	0	1	0	0	1	0	2	7	3	0
51	Les Dodd (ENG)	0	0	0	0	0	0	0	1	0	1	0	0	2	6	5	0
52	Ken Owers (ENG) (New)	–	–	–	–	–	–	2	0	0	0	0	0	2	3	1	2
53	Jon Wright (ENG) (New)	–	–	–	–	–	–	0	0	0	1	0	1	2	2	1	2
54	Mark Bennett (WAL) (New)	–	–	–	–	–	–	0	1	0	0	0	1	2	2	0	12
55	Joe O'Boye (IRL)	0	1	0	0	0	0	0	1	0	0	0	0	2	7	2	8
56	Malcolm Bradley (ENG)	1	0	0	0	0	0	0	0	0	1	0	0	2	7	4	0
57	Roger Bales (ENG)	0	0	0	0	1	0	1	0	0	0	0	0	2	2	6	9
58	Tony Chappel (WAL)	1	0	1	0	0	0	0	0	0	0	0	0	2	7	4	0
59	Ray Edmonds (ENG)	0	1	0	0	0	1	0	0	0	0	0	0	2	5	6	0
60	George Scott (ENG)	1	1	0	0	0	0	0	0	0	0	0	0	2	5	5	0
61	Fred Davis (ENG)	0	0	1	1	0	0	0	0	0	0	0	0	2	3	7	0
62	Geoff Foulds (ENG)	0	0	0	0	0	0	1	0	0	0	0	0	1	5	5	1
63	Robbie Grace (RSA)	0	0	0	0	0	0	0	0	1	0	0	0	1	1	2	13
64	Pat Houlihan (ENG)	0	0	0	0	0	0	1	0	0	0	0	0	1	1	3	25
65	Anthony Kearney (IRL)	0	0	0	0	0	0	0	0	0	1	0	0	1	0	8	15
66	Steve James (ENG) (New)	–	–	–	–	–	–	0	0	0	0	1	0	1	0	3	7
67	Paul Medati (ENG)	0	0	0	0	1	0	0	0	0	0	0	0	1	9	4	0
68	Graham Miles (ENG)	0	1	0	0	0	0	0	0	0	0	0	0	1	8	3	0
69	John Rea (SCO)	0	0	0	0	1	0	0	0	0	0	0	0	1	7	4	0
70	Matt Gibson (SCO)	1	0	0	0	0	0	0	0	0	0	0	0	1	7	4	0
71	Jimmy van Rensberg (RSA)	0	0	0	1	0	0	0	0	0	0	0	0	1	6	6	0
72	Vic Harris (ENG)	0	0	0	1	0	0	0	0	0	0	0	0	1	5	6	0
73	Bernie Mikkelsen (CAN)	0	0	0	1	0	0	0	0	0	0	0	0	1	5	6	0
74	Ian Black (SCO)	1	0	0	0	0	0	0	0	0	0	0	0	1	4	7	0
75	Patsy Fagan (IRL)	0	0	0	0	1	0	0	0	0	0	0	0	1	3	7	0
76	Eddie Sinclair (SCO)	0	0	0	0	0	0	0	0	0	0	0	0	0	8	4	0
77	Mario Morra (CAN)	0	0	0	0	0	0	0	0	0	0	0	0	0	6	6	0
78	Colin Roscoe (WAL)	0	0	0	0	0	0	0	0	0	0	0	0	0	6	5	3
79	Robby Foldvari (AUS)	0	0	0	0	0	0	0	0	0	0	0	0	0	6	7	0
80	Ian Williamson (ENG)	0	0	0	0	0	0	0	0	0	0	0	0	0	4	8	0
81	Mike Watterson (ENG)	0	0	0	0	0	0	0	0	0	0	0	0	0	4	2	8
82	Dave Gilbert (ENG)	0	0	0	0	0	0	0	0	0	0	0	0	0	4	5	17
83	David Roe (ENG) (New)	–	–	–	–	–	–	0	0	0	0	0	0	0	3	3	0
84	Bill Oliver (ENG)	0	0	0	0	0	0	0	0	0	0	0	0	0	3	9	4
85	Gino Rigitano (CAN)	0	0	0	0	0	0	0	0	0	0	0	0	0	3	8	5
86	Jim Bear (CAN)	0	0	0	0	0	0	0	0	0	0	0	0	0	3	4	4
87	Jim Donnelly (SCO)	0	0	0	0	0	0	0	0	0	0	0	0	0	3	7	8
88	Jack Fitzmaurice (ENG)	0	0	0	0	0	0	0	0	0	0	0	0	0	3	5	8
89	Mike Darrington (ENG)	0	0	0	0	0	0	0	0	0	0	0	0	0	3	3	13
90	Brian Rowswell (ENG) (New)	–	–	–	–	–	–	0	0	0	0	0	0	0	2	3	1
91	Jim Meadowcroft (ENG)	0	0	0	0	0	0	0	0	0	0	0	0	0	2	8	6
92	Mick Fisher (ENG)	0	0	0	0	0	0	0	0	0	0	0	0	0	2	7	8
93	Greg Jenkins (AUS)	0	0	0	0	0	0	0	0	0	0	0	0	0	2	5	8
94	Dessie Sheehan (IRL)	0	0	0	0	0	0	0	0	0	0	0	0	0	2	4	18
95	Frank Jonik (CAN)	0	0	0	0	0	0	0	0	0	0	0	0	0	1	7	12
96	Glen Wilkinson (AUS)	0	0	0	0	0	0	0	0	0	0	0	0	0	1	6	13
97	Pascal Burke (IRL)	0	0	0	0	0	0	0	0	0	0	0	0	0	1	5	23
98	Paul Gibson (ENG) (New)	–	–	–	–	–	–	0	0	0	0	0	0	0	1	4	6
99	Nigel Gilbert (ENG) (New)	–	–	–	–	–	–	0	0	0	0	0	0	0	1	4	1
100	Ian Anderson (AUS)	0	0	0	0	0	0	0	0	0	0	0	0	0	1	1	0
101	Jim Rempe (USA)	0	0	0	0	0	0	0	0	0	0	0	0	0	1	1	2
102	Billy Kelly (IRL)	0	0	0	0	0	0	0	0	0	0	0	0	0	1	9	11
103	John Dunning (ENG)	0	0	0	0	0	0	0	0	0	0	0	0	0	1	4	20
104	John Hargreaves (ENG)	0	0	0	0	0	0	0	0	0	0	0	0	0	1	4	20
105	Dennis Hughes (ENG)	0	0	0	0	0	0	0	0	0	0	0	0	0	1	4	17
106	Eddie McLaughlin (SCO)	0	0	0	0	0	0	0	0	0	0	0	0	0	1	4	0
107	Martin Smith (ENG)	0	0	0	0	0	0	0	0	0	0	0	0	0	1	3	29
108	Gerry Watson (CAN)	0	0	0	0	0	0	0	0	0	0	0	0	0	1	0	8
109	Paul Thornley (CAN)	0	0	0	0	0	0	0	0	0	0	0	0	0	1	0	6
110	Dave Chalmers (ENG)	0	0	0	0	0	0	0	0	0	0	0	0	0	0	9	11
111	Jackie Rea (NIR)	0	0	0	0	0	0	0	0	0	0	0	0	0	0	7	6
112	Clive Everton (WAL)	0	0	0	0	0	0	0	0	0	0	0	0	0	0	7	7
113	Paul Watchorn (IRL)	0	0	0	0	0	0	0	0	0	0	0	0	0	0	5	26
114	Derek Mienie (RSA)	0	0	0	0	0	0	0	0	0	0	0	0	0	0	3	29
115	Terry Whitthread (ENG) (New)	–	–	–	–	–	–	0	0	0	0	0	0	0	0	2	12
116	François Ellis (RSA) (New)	–	–	–	–	–	–	0	0	0	0	0	0	0	0	2	10
117	David Greaves (ENG)	0	0	0	0	0	0	0	0	0	0	0	0	0	0	2	31
118	Joe Cagianello (CAN)	0	0	0	0	0	0	0	0	0	0	0	0	0	0	2	7
119	Mike Hines (RSA) (NT)	0	0	0	0	0	0	0	0	0	0	0	0	0	0	1	6
120	Bert Demarco (SCO) (NT)	0	0	0	0	0	0	0	0	0	0	0	0	0	0	1	28
121	Paddy Morgan (AUS) (NT)	0	0	0	0	0	0	0	0	0	0	0	0	0	0	1	0
122	Maurice Parkin (ENG) (NT)	0	0	0	0	0	0	0	0	0	0	0	0	0	0	0	27
123	Bernard Bennett (ENG) (NT)	0	0	0	0	0	0	0	0	0	0	0	0	0	0	0	20
124	James Giannaros (AUS) (NT)	0	0	0	0	0	0	0	0	0	0	0	0	0	0	0	0
125	Lou Condo (AUS) (NT)	0	0	0	0	0	0	0	0	0	0	0	0	0	0	0	0
126	Manuel Francisco (RSA) (NT)	0	0	0	0	0	0	0	0	0	0	0	0	0	0	0	0
127	Steve Mizerak (USA) (NT)	0	0	0	0	0	0	0	0	0	0	0	0	0	0	0	0
128	Wayne Sanderson (CAN) (NT)	0	0	0	0	0	0	0	0	0	0	0	0	0	0	0	0

Preceded by 1986/1987	1987/1988	Succeeded by 1988/1989
