= 1985 Irish Professional Championship =

Irish Professional Championship
Tournament information
- Dates: 8–11 April 1985
- Venue: Ulster Hall
- City: Belfast
- Country: Northern Ireland
- Format: Non-ranking event
- Total prize fund: £20,000
- Winner's share: £7,500
- Highest break: Alex Higgins (NIR) (136)

Final
- Champion: (Northern Ireland) Dennis Taylor
- Runner-up: (Northern Ireland) Alex Higgins
- Score: 10–5

The 1985 Strongbow Irish Professional Championship was a professional invitational snooker tournament, which took place between 8 and 11 April 1985 at the Ulster Hall in Belfast, Northern Ireland.

Dennis Taylor won the title beating Alex Higgins 10–5 in the final.

== Qualifying rounds ==
=== Round 1 ===
- (Northern Ireland) Jack McLaughlin 6–3 Dessie Sheehan (Republic of Ireland)

=== Round 2 ===
- (Republic of Ireland) Pascal Burke 6–3 Tony Kearney (Republic of Ireland)
- (Republic of Ireland) Billy Kelly 6–2 Paul Watchorn (Republic of Ireland)
- (Northern Ireland) Tommy Murphy 6–3 Paddy Browne (Republic of Ireland)
- (Northern Ireland) Jackie Rea 6–5 Jack McLaughlin (Northern Ireland)

== Main draw ==
Quarter-finals; Best of 11 frames
(Northern Ireland) Dennis Taylor	6
(Northern Ireland) Jackie Rea	0
(Republic of Ireland) Eugene Hughes	6
(Republic of Ireland) Billy Kelly	2
(Northern Ireland) Alex Higgins	6
(Republic of Ireland) Pascal Burke	0
(Republic of Ireland) Patsy Fagan	6
(Northern Ireland) Tommy Murphy	2

Semi-finals; Best of 11 frames
(Northern Ireland) Dennis Taylor	6
(Republic of Ireland) Eugene Hughes	5
(Northern Ireland) Alex Higgins	6
(Republic of Ireland) Patsy Fagan	3

Final; Best of 19 frames
(Northern Ireland) Dennis Taylor	10
(Northern Ireland) Alex Higgins	5
