= 1987 World Snooker Championship =

Professional snooker tournament

1987 Embassy World Snooker Championship

Tournament information
- Dates: 18 April – 4 May 1987
- Venue: Crucible Theatre
- City: Sheffield
- Country: England
- Organisation: WPBSA
- Format: Ranking event
- Total prize fund: £400,000
- Winner's share: £80,000
- Highest break: Steve Davis (ENG) (127)

Final
- Champion: Steve Davis (ENG)
- Runner-up: Joe Johnson (ENG)
- Score: 18–14

The 1987 World Snooker Championship (also referred to as the 1987 Embassy World Snooker Championship for the purpose of sponsorship) was a professional snooker tournament that took place between 18 April and 4 May 1987 at the Crucible Theatre in Sheffield, England. It was the sixth and final ranking event of the 1986–87 snooker season. The championship was the 1987 edition of the World Snooker Championship, first held in 1927, and had 32 participants. The highest ranked 16 players were awarded a place in the first round draw, whilst a pre-tournament qualification event for 104 professionals was held between 26 March and 4 April at the Preston Guild Hall for the remaining places. The tournament was sponsored by cigarette manufacturer Embassy and had a prize fund of £400,000 with the winner receiving £80,000.

Since his 1986 victory, Joe Johnson had experienced a disappointing season leading up to the 1987 Championship, and bookmakers considered it unlikely that he would retain the title. Johnson did reach the final, a rematch of the previous year's final against Steve Davis. Davis won his fourth championship by defeating Johnson 18 frames to 14. A total of 18 century breaks were made during the tournament, the highest of which was 127 made by Davis in the first frame of the final. Stephen Hendry, aged 18, became the youngest player to win a match in the tournament's history since it moved to the Crucible in 1977, whilst it was the last time that six-times champion Ray Reardon appeared.

== Overview ==
The World Snooker Championship is a professional tournament and the official world championship of the game of snooker. Founded in the late 19th century by British Army soldiers stationed in India, the sport was popular in the British Isles. However, in the modern era it has become increasingly popular worldwide, especially in East and Southeast Asian nations such as China, Hong Kong and Thailand. (Note: The "modern era" of snooker is understood to have started in 1969, when the World Championship reverted to a knockout format.)

The 1987 championship featured 32 professional players competing in one-on-one snooker matches in a single elimination format, each played over several frames. The 32 competitors in the main tournament were selected using a combination of the top players in the world snooker rankings and a pre-tournament qualification stage. The tournament was promoted by WPBSA Promotions, a subsidiary of professional snooker governing body the World Professional Billiards and Snooker Association (WPBSA). Joe Davis won the first World Championship in 1927, the final match being held in Camkin's Hall, Birmingham, England. Since 1977, the event has been held in the Crucible Theatre in Sheffield, England.

=== Format ===
The championship was held from 18 April to 4 May 1987 at the Crucible, the 11th time that the tournament was held at the venue. It was the last ranking event of the 1986–87 snooker season on the World Snooker Tour. There were a total of 120 entrants from the tour, and the competition's main draw had 32 participants. A four-round knockout qualifying competition was held at Preston Guild Hall from 26 March to 4 April which produced the 16 qualifying players who progressed into the main draw to play the top 16 seeds.

The top 16 players in the latest world rankings automatically qualified for the main draw as seeded players. (Note: If the defending champion was ranked outside the top 16 in the world rankings as an automatic qualifier.) As defending champion, Joe Johnson was seeded first for the event; the remaining 15 seeds were allocated based on the players' world ranking positions. Matches in the first round of the main draw were played as best-of-19-frames, meaning 10 frames were required to win the match. The number of frames needed to win a match increased to 13 in the second round and quarter-finals, and 16 in the semi-finals; the final match was played as best-of-35-frames.

=== Prize fund ===
The event featured a prize fund of £400,000 with the winner receiving £80,000. The breakdown of prize money for the event is shown below:

- Winner: £80,000
- Runner-up: £48,000
- Semi-finals: £24,000
- Quarter-finals: £12,000
- Last 16: £6,000
- Last 32: £3,375
- Fourth qualifying round: £2,625
- Third qualifying round: £1,375
- Highest break: £8,000
- Highest break in qualifying: £2,000
- Maximum break: £80,000
- Total: £400,000

== Tournament summary ==
The defending champion, Joe Johnson, had failed to reach as far as the quarter-finals of a major tournament in the 1986–87 snooker season after winning the 1986 World Championship. This record was described by The Sydney Morning Herald's Les Wheeler as "disappointing" and by Clive Everton as a "poor" season. Sydney Friskin of The Times reported that Johnson prepared for the Championship by practising diligently, and that the cyst on his back that previously troubled him had been removed. Johnson started the event as a bookmakers' outsider, priced at 66–1 against winning the tournament.

Leading up to the event, Neal Foulds had been the most successful player of the season, having gained the most ranking points during the season, ahead of Steve Davis. Twelve days before the start of the tournament, the two-times world champion Alex Higgins was fined £12,000 and given a six-month ban from tournaments by the WPBSA. The ban started on 5 May, the day after the final of the 1987 World Snooker Championship. The penalties resulted from a number of incidents, the most serious of which was headbutting Paul Hatherall, a WPBSA tournament director, at the 1986 UK Championship.

=== Qualifying ===
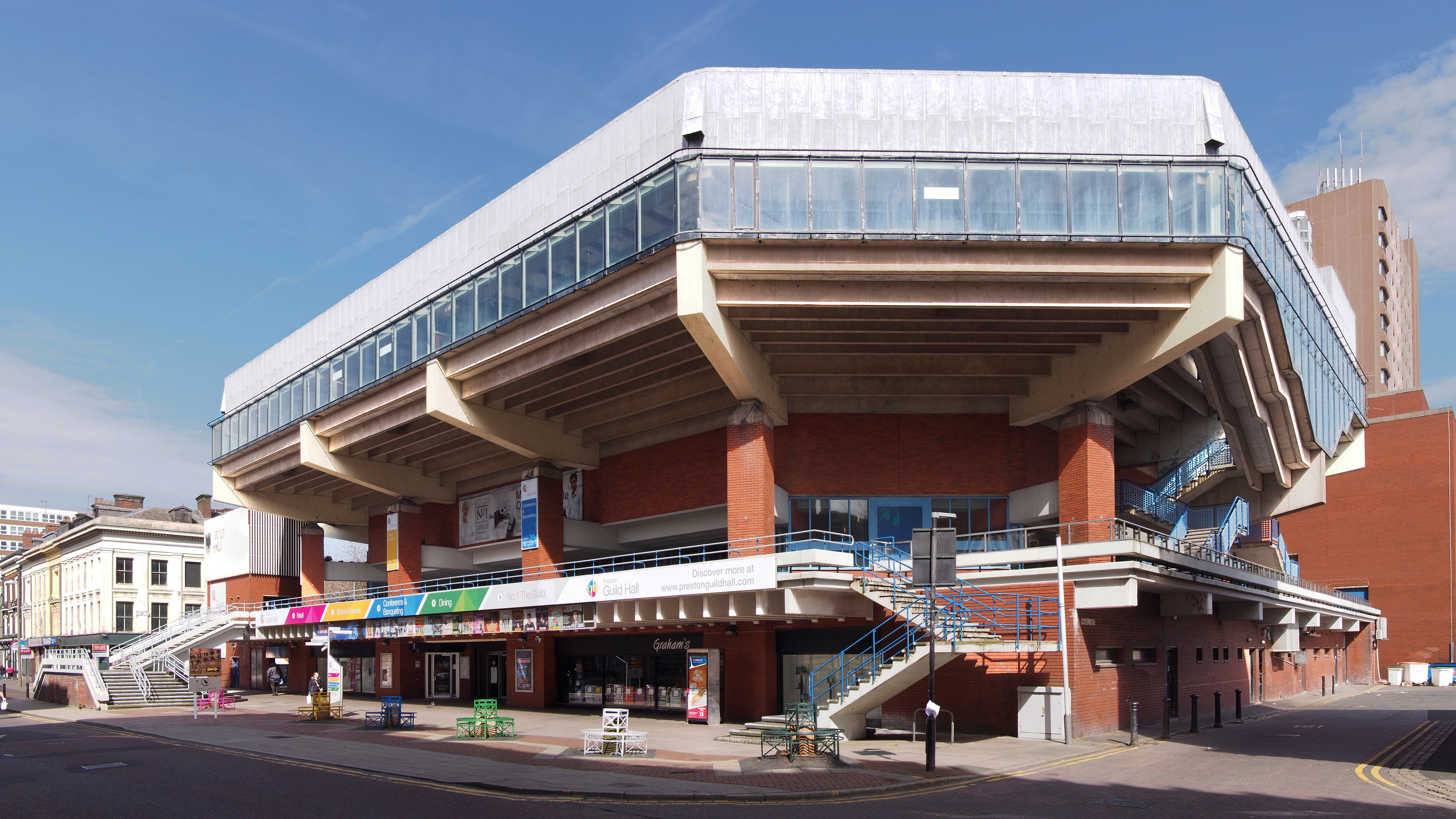
The Preston Guild Hall hosted qualifying for the event.

There were four rounds of qualifying, with higher ranked players seeded into the later rounds, and 104 entrants which took place at the Preston Guild Hall between 25 March and 4 April 1987. The 16 winners in the fourth round progressed to play the tournament's top 16 seeds at the Crucible. All qualifying matches were best-of-19 frames held over two sessions. There were 24 matches scheduled in the first qualifying round, but Frank Jonik, Eddie McLaughlin, Sakchai Sim Ngam and Omprakesh Agrawal all withdrew, meaning that their opponents received walkovers. The 11-time pool world champion, Jim Rempe, made a break of 104 in defeating Martin Smith 10–9. Veteran professional Bernard Bennett suffered the only whitewash of the first round, failing to win a frame against Billy Kelly.

In the second round, there were 32 matches. The youngest player in the competition, Stephen Hendry, made a break of 108 during his 10–7 defeat of Mike Darrington. Eight-times champion Fred Davis lost 5–10 to Ken Owers. Another former champion, John Spencer, who had won the title three times, eliminated Roger Bales 10–3. Trailing after the first session of his qualifying match 3–5, Jimmy van Rensberg was taken to hospital with a suspected heart attack. However, he was later discharged and went on to win 10–6.

The third round consisted of 16 matches between winners from the second round. Hendry led 8–1 against Rempe at the end of their first session, with Rempe winning three consecutive frames in their second session before Hendry won the match 10–4. Gino Rigitano conceded the 11th frame of his match against Steve Newbury when there were still enough balls on the table for him to win, and when 4–9 down decided not to play the next frame, thereby losing 4–10. There were two 10–0 whitewashes: by Jon Wright over Mark Wildman and by Tony Jones over van Rensberg.

The fourth round also featured 16 matches, with 16 players seeded into the round each meeting one of the third round winners. For the first time since turning professional, John Spencer failed to qualify for the event, as he was defeated 5–10 by Barry West. Bill Werbeniuk and Eddie Charlton also failed to qualify for the competition for the first time. Werbeniuk lost 8–10 to Mark Bennett and Charlton was defeated 4–10 by Warren King. The only match to go to a deciding frame in round four was John Virgo's 10–9 win over Tony Jones. Dene O'Kane scored five century breaks across his three matches, a new record, including a 132. He received £2,000 for this break, the highest during qualifying.

=== First round ===
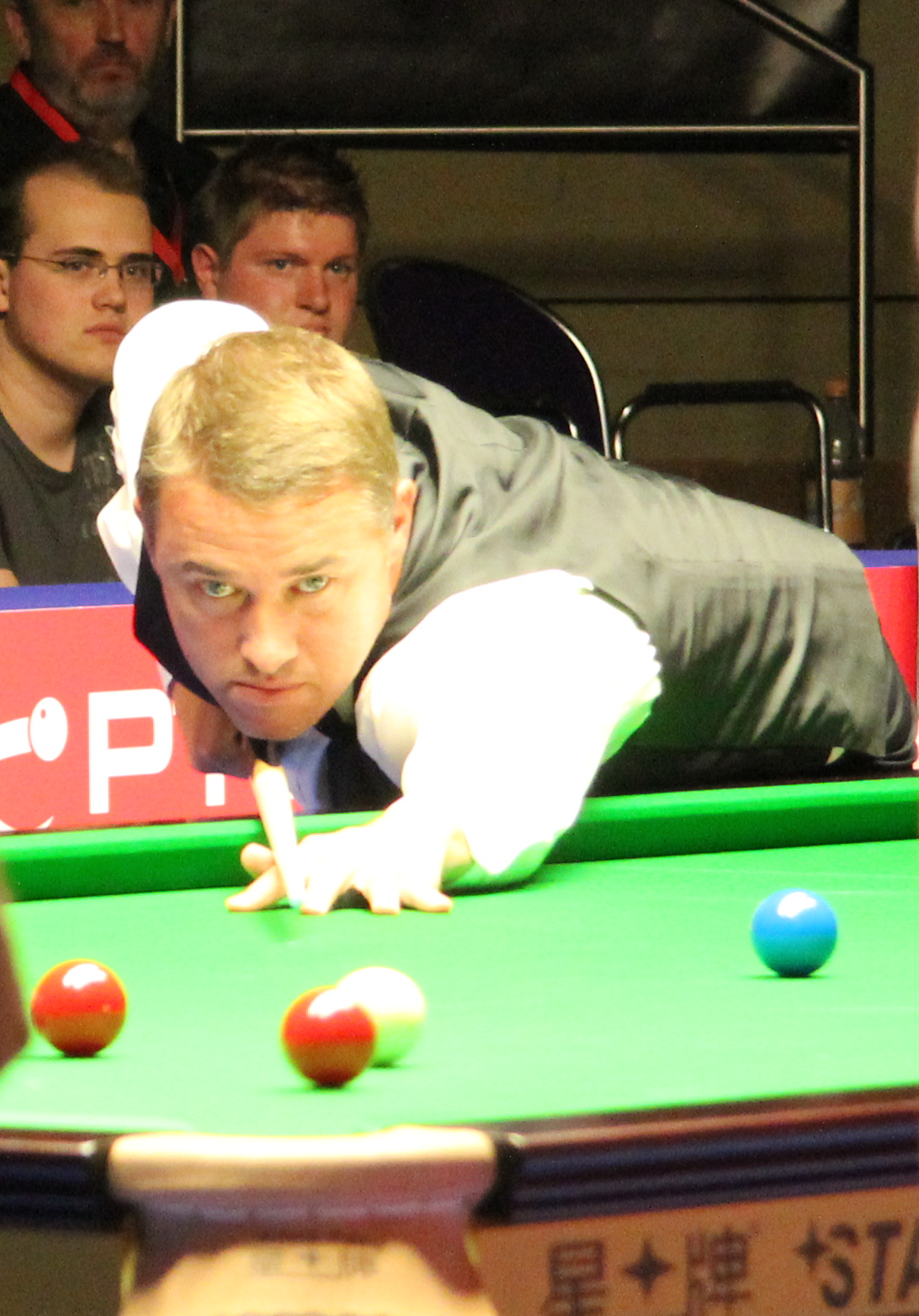
Stephen Hendry (pictured in 2011) became the youngest player ever to win a match in the main stage of the tournament.

The first round of the main tournament was held from 18 to 23 April with matches played as the best-of-19 frames over two sessions. Defending champion Joe Johnson played Eugene Hughes, with the match going to a deciding frame and Johnson winning 10–9. Steve Davis was 7–1 ahead of Warren King at the end of their first session, but King then won six of the next seven frames to reduce Davis's lead to one frame at 8–7. Davis narrowly won frame 16 with a break of 63, then completed a 10–7 victory in frame 17, where he successfully gained enough foul points from King, despite requiring snookers.

Murdo MacLeod defeated Rex Williams 10–5, despite Williams making the highest break of the first round, a 112. The win made MacLeod the first Scottish player to secure a victory at the Crucible Theatre. Stephen Hendry met veteran player Willie Thorne, led 5–4 at the end of their first session, and then took the first four frames in the second, before Thorne won three in a row. Hendry took the 17th frame to achieve a 10–7 win. At age 18 years and 97 days, Hendry became the youngest-ever player to win a World Championship match at the Crucible. Steve Longworth led 5–4 after the first session of his match, and won five successive frames to defeat Kirk Stevens 10–5. Terry Griffiths also progressed from a 5–4 interval lead to a 10–4 win, against Jim Wych. Alex Higgins, due to start a six-month ban after the Championship, eliminated first-year professional Jon Wright 10–6.

Jimmy White led Dean Reynolds 5–4 at the end of their first session. Reynolds won the first two frames of the second session both on respotted blacks, before White went on to win 10–8. From 7–8, White made breaks of 70, 75 and 59 to win the three frames he needed to progress. O'Kane, 39th in the rankings, won nine frames in a row against second-ranked player Cliff Thorburn to win 10–5. Thorburn's cue tip split during the sixth frame and was not replaced until after the end of the first session. He was unable to win a frame after the tip was broken. Six-time champion Ray Reardon defeated debutant Barry West 10–5. Fourth seed Tony Knowles lost 6–10 to Mike Hallett, having led 6–5, and 11th seed Tony Meo lost 8–10 to John Parrott.

Silvino Francisco and John Campbell played only eight of their scheduled nine frames in the first session, due to slow play, with Francisco leading 5–3 when they started the following session. Francisco won five consecutive frames at the start of the second session to complete a 10–3 win. Doug Mountjoy led David Taylor 6–3 after their first session, and won 10–6. The 1985 champion Dennis Taylor led Bennett 8–1 before winning 10–4. Neal Foulds led John Virgo 7–2 after their first session and won 10–4.

=== Second round ===
The second round was played from 23 to 27 April with matches as the best-of-25 frames held over three sessions. Johnson led MacLeod 6–2 and 10–6 after the first two sessions, winning 13–7. Hendry and Longworth were level at 4–4 after their first session, with Hendry then opening up a 7–4 lead with breaks of 96, 54 and 89, and finishing the second session 10–6 ahead after winning the 16th frame on a re-spotted black. Later trailing by six frames, Longworth won the 19th with a 103 break, before Hendry completed a 13–7 victory. Francisco and Hallett were at 8–8 after their second session before Hallett won three frames in a row, with breaks of 84, 47, 35 and 93. He also won the 20th frame, after requiring foul shots from Francisco, to lead 12–8, and clinched victory at 13–9 to reach his first World Championship quarter-final. Foulds led Taylor 5–3 after their first session, and won the match 13–10.

O'Kane eliminated another top-16 player with a victory over Mountjoy. Mountjoy led 3–0, but O'Kane then won the next six frames, and won 13–5. White made a break of 114 in his match against Parrott, the highest in that year's championship to that point, and won 13–11. Five of the frames had been decided on the black, with White winning four of them. Higgins led Griffiths 6–3 after the first session but Griffiths won four frames in a row and the match was tied at 8–8. Griffiths went on to defeat Higgins 13–10. Six-times winner of the event Reardon led 3–1 but lost 12 of the next 13 frames as he was eliminated 4–13 by Davis. After the tournament, Reardon dropped out of the top 16 in the end-of-season world rankings, moving down from 15 to 38.

=== Quarter-finals ===
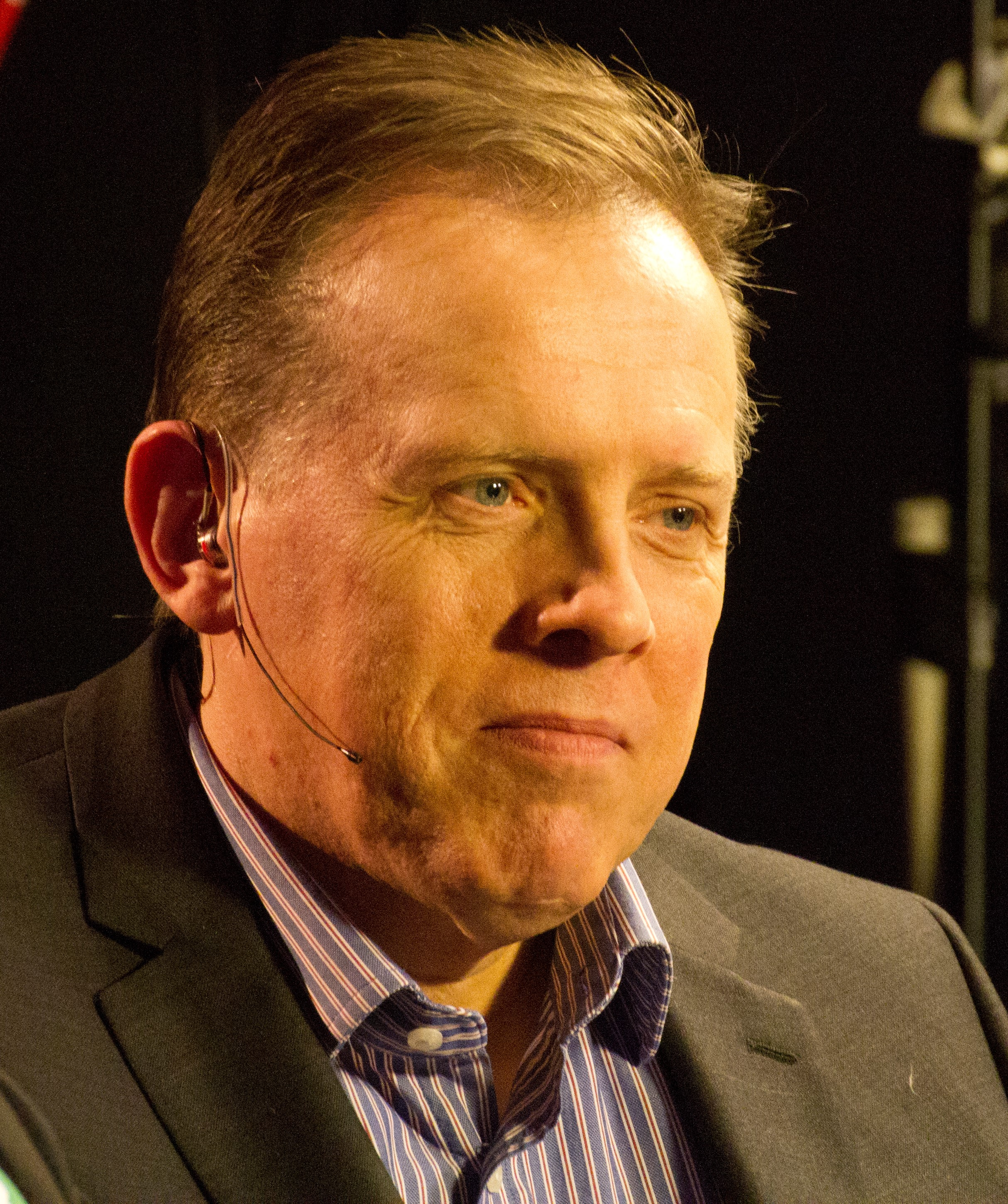
Neal Foulds (pictured in 2015) reached the semi-finals for the only time in his career by defeating Mike Hallett 13–9.

The quarter-final matches were played over three sessions, in best-of-25 frames, on 28 and 29 April. Johnson led Hendry 8–1 and 12–8, before Hendry won four frames in a row to take the match to a deciding frame at 12–12. In the final frame, after Hendry failed to pot a red ball, Johnson made a break of 46 to take the frame and match 13–12. Hallett compiled two century breaks in the first session of his match against Foulds, who also constructed a century break, with their first session ending at 4–4. Foulds then opened up a lead, leading 10–6 and 12–7 before winning at 13–9.

Davis was 4–3 ahead of Griffiths after their first session, and 10–5 ahead by the end of the second. He wrapped up a 13–5 win and with breaks of 62, 86 and 51 in three frames in the final session. It was the fifth time that Davis had defeated Griffiths at the World Championship, and the largest winning margin of those encounters. White won all eight frames in the first session in his match against O'Kane, and after winning the first frame of the second session, led 9–0. O'Kane then won five consecutive frames, before White took four of the following five frames to win 13–6.

=== Semi-finals ===
The semi-final matches were played as the best-of-31 frames, held over four sessions, from 30 April to 2 May. Johnson met Foulds in the first semi-final. The pair were tied at 3–3, but Foulds missed a pot on the black ball in frame seven allowing Johnson to take a one-frame lead after the first session. In frame eight, Foulds made a break of 48 to win the frame, and won frame nine, despite requiring foul shots. Johnson made breaks of 47 in each of the next two frames to lead 6–5. Foulds took the next before Johnson, with his fourth break of 47 in four frames, took the lead again. Foulds won the last frame of the session with a break of 45 to leave them all square at 7–7 after two sessions, and made a break of 114 in the 15th frame to go one ahead before Johnson won seven frames in a row to lead 14–8. After this, Foulds won frame 23, but Johnson won the next two frames to win the match 16–9 to reach his second final.

Davis and White had been level at 4–4 after their first session, with Davis winning the first four of their second session to lead 8–4 and finishing that session 9–6 ahead. In the first frame of the third session, White was on course to make a maximum break, having potted ten reds and nine blacks, but missed the tenth black. After this, Davis required White to make foul shots in order to gain the necessary penalty points from them for Davis to win the frame. Aided by a fluked black, and by a free ball following a foul by White, Davis eventually won the frame by one point. John Hennessey in Pot Black magazine wrote that "at that moment White lost the chance of claiming his first world title," adding that White's father later said that losing the frame affected White badly during the following three. However, White later compiled a 119 break, the new highest in the competition, overtaking his earlier 114 in the second round, and ended the third session 9–13 behind. White took the first frame of the fourth session, but lost three of the following four frame as Davis won the match 16–11, concluding with a 74 break in the 27th frame.

=== Final ===
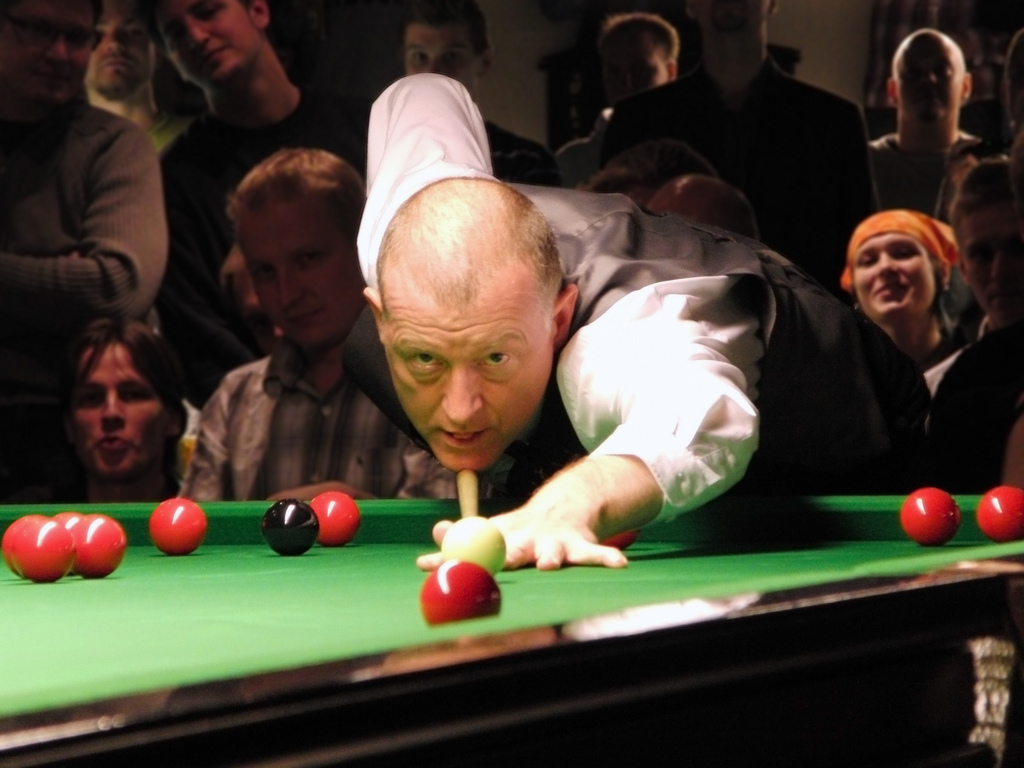
Steve Davis (pictured in 2008) won his fourth world title, defeating Joe Johnson 18–14.

The final was played as a best-of-35 frames match held over four sessions between Davis and Johnson on 3 and 4 May 1987. It was the first time that the same two players had met in the final at the Crucible for the second year in a row. The last time that two players had met in consecutive finals at the World Championship was when Fred Davis and John Pulman had both reached the final in 1955 and 1956, played at the Tower Circus, Blackpool. The next time it would happen was when Hendry and White met in three consecutive finals between 1992 and 1994. This was also the first time that the final had been contested by the top two seeds of the tournament. The final was refereed by Len Ganley, the second time he had taken charge of the World Championship final.

In frame one, Davis compiled a 127 break, which remained the highest break of that year's tournament. Johnson responded winning three frames in a row followed by Davis taking two to level at 3-3. Johnson was 4–3 ahead at the end of the first session. Davis added three successive frames to lead 6–4 at the start of the second session, then Johnson won the 11th frame with a break of 101 before falling three behind as Davis won the next two frames. Johnson was behind in the 14th frame but won it with a break of 73. The last two frames of the session were both won with the aid of fluked reds: the 15th frame by Davis, and the last of the day by Johnson, the day finishing with Davis leading 9–7. On the second day, Johnson won the first frame of the third session to reduce Davis's lead to one frame. Davis then took four consecutive frames to lead 13–8, but missed the last red ball when on a break of 52. Johnson then cleared up to the black, which Davis would have required to level the scores in the frame. However, Davis left the black in a position that it could be potted from, and Johnson won the frame. Davis won the next frame, to lead 14–9 at the end of the third session.

Johnson made a break of 52 in the first frame of the fourth session, but failed on an attempt to pot a red, which gave Davis an opportunity. Davis then made a break of 35, but left an easy green ball for Johnson, who cleared to the pink ball to win. In the next frame, Johnson made a break of 62, and then Davis attempted a clearance, but missed the yellow ball. Johnson potted the yellow from distance and cleared to the blue, with Davis then conceding the frame. Johnson led 50–0 in the next frame, and with both players making a number of errors Davis left him an easy brown that allowed Johnson in to win his fourth consecutive frame to move to one behind at 13–14. Davis had breaks of 64 and 40 to lead 15–13, a break of 73 to help make it 16–13, and 17–13 winning frame 30, decided on the final colours. Johnson won another frame, with a break of 67, before Davis clinched victory with a break of 73 to make it 18–14, achieving his fourth World Championship title. After the match, Davis said: "Winning this is better than 1981 because I've experienced getting beat in the final and its horrible."

== Aftermath ==
During the tournament, there were reports that Foulds and WPBSA chairman Williams were taking beta blockers. These were banned under International Olympic Committee rules, but not prohibited in snooker. Colin Moynihan, a Member of the British Parliament, called for Williams to resign and any players using beta blockers to withdraw from competing. In November 1987, the WPBSA was suspended from using the Sports Council's drug-testing facilities until the use of beta blockers was banned from the sport. Moynihan wrote to Williams supporting the ban that had been proposed by the Sports Council's Drug Advisory Group. Williams resigned as WPBSA chairman in November 1987, having received criticism over the drug testing issue as well as over his personal business connections with promoters Barry Hearn and Frank Warren. The WPBSA voted to ban the use of beta blockers, other than cardioselective types, in January 1988, with the ban to come into effect from the start of the 1988–89 snooker season.

== Main draw ==
Shown below are the results for the tournament. The numbers in brackets denote players seedings, whilst players in bold are match winners.

**First round** Best of 19 frames
18 April
**Joe Johnson (ENG) (1)**	**10**
Eugene Hughes (IRL)	9
18 & 19 April
Rex Williams (ENG) (16)	5
**Murdo MacLeod (SCO)**	**10**
19 & 20 April
Kirk Stevens (CAN) (9)	4
**Steve Longworth (ENG)**	**10**
19 & 20 April
Willie Thorne (ENG) (8)	7
**Stephen Hendry (SCO)**	**10**
20 & 21 April
Tony Knowles (ENG) (5)	6
**Mike Hallett (ENG)**	**10**
21 & 22 April
**Silvino Francisco (RSA) (12)**	**10**
John Campbell (AUS)	3
21 & 22 April
**Neal Foulds (ENG) (13)**	**10**
John Virgo (ENG)	4
22 & 23 April
**Dennis Taylor (NIR) (4)**	**10**
Mark Bennett (WAL)	4
22 & 23 April
Cliff Thorburn (CAN) (3)	5
**Dene O'Kane (NZL)**	**10**
22 April
**Doug Mountjoy (WAL) (14)**	**10**
David Taylor (ENG)	5
21 April
Tony Meo (ENG) (11)	8
**John Parrott (ENG)**	**10**
20 & 21 April
**Jimmy White (ENG) (6)**	**10**
Dean Reynolds (ENG)	8
19 & 20 April
**Alex Higgins (NIR) (7)**	**10**
Jon Wright (ENG)	6
19 & 20 April
**Terry Griffiths (WAL) (10)**	**10**
Jim Wych (CAN)	4
18 & 19 April
**Ray Reardon (WAL) (15)**	**10**
Barry West (ENG)	5
18 April
**Steve Davis (ENG) (2)**	**10**
Warren King (AUS)	7

**Second round** Best of 25 frames
23 & 24 April
(England) **Joe Johnson (1)**	**13**
(Scotland) Murdo MacLeod	7
24 & 25 April
(England) Steve Longworth	7
(Scotland) **Stephen Hendry**	**13**
25, 26 & 27 April
(England) **Mike Hallett**	**13**
(South Africa) Silvino Francisco (12)	9
26 & 27 April
(England) **Neal Foulds (13)**	**13**
(Northern Ireland) Dennis Taylor (4)	10
26 & 27 April
(New Zealand) **Dene O'Kane**	**13**
(Wales) Doug Mountjoy (14)	5
25, 26 & 27 April
(England) John Parrott	11
(England) **Jimmy White (6)**	**13**
24 & 25 April
(Northern Ireland) Alex Higgins (7)	10
(Wales) **Terry Griffiths (10)**	**13**
23, 24 & 25 April
(Wales) Ray Reardon (15)	4
(England) **Steve Davis (2)**	**13**

**Quarter-finals**; Best of 25 frames
28 & 29 April
(England) **Joe Johnson (1)**	**13**
(Scotland) Stephen Hendry	12
28 & 29 April
(England) Mike Hallett	9
(England) **Neal Foulds (13)**	**13**
28 & 29 April
(New Zealand) Dene O'Kane	6
(England) **Jimmy White (6)**	**13**
28 & 29 April
(Wales) Terry Griffiths (10)	5
(England) **Steve Davis (2)**	**13**

**Semi-finals**; Best of 31 frames
30 April 1 & 2 May
(England) **Joe Johnson (1)**	**16**
(England) Neal Foulds (13)	9
30 April 1 & 2 May
(England) Jimmy White (6)	11
(England) **Steve Davis (2)**	**16**

**Final**; Best of 35 frames
3 & 4 May
(England) Joe Johnson (1)	14
(England) **Steve Davis (2)**	**18**

**Final** (Best of 35 frames) Crucible Theatre, Sheffield, 3 & 4 May 1987. Referee: Len Ganley
Joe Johnson (1)
England
14–**18**
**Steve Davis (2)**
England
0–128, **61**–53, **74**–69, **71**–2, 1–77, 12–83, **66**–57, 8–69, 35–82, 5–79, **118**–15, 25–77, 0–91, **76**–44, 7–88, **70**–6, **68**–34, 0–69, 0–80, 24–81, 24–68, **66**–52, 0–77, **75**–22, **70**–53, **76**–44, **73**–59, 0–104, 6–113, 33–91, **77**–34, 0–78
Century breaks: 2 (Johnson 1, Davis 1)

Highest break by Johnson: 101
Highest break by Davis: 127

0–**128**, 61–53, 74–69, 71–2, 1–**77**, 12–**83**, 66–57, 8–**69**, 35–**82**, 5–**79**, 118–15, 25–**77**, 0–**91**, 76–44, 7–**88**, 70–6, 68–34, 0–**69**, 0–**80**, 24–**81**, 24–**68**, 66–52, 0–**77**, 75–22, 70–53, 76–44, 73–59, 0–**104**, 6–**113**, 33–**91**, 77–34, 0–**78**
**(England) Steve Davis** wins the 1987 Embassy World Snooker Championship

== Qualifying ==
The qualifying stages took place at the Preston Guild Hall between 25 March and 4 April 1987.

Results from the qualification event are shown below. Players shown in bold denote match winners.

**Round 1** Best of 19 frames
**Jim Bear (CAN)**	**10**
Jackie Rea (NIR)	5
Frank Jonik (CAN)
**Tony Kearney (IRL)**	w.o.
**Eddie Sinclair (SCO)**
Bye
Mike Watterson (ENG)	2
**Steve James (ENG)**	**10**
**Greg Jenkins (AUS)**	**10**
Robbie Grace (RSA)	9
Paul Thornley (CAN)	6
**David Greaves (ENG)**	**10**
**Mike Darrington (ENG)**	**10**
Bert Demarco (SCO)	6
Martin Smith (ENG)	9
**Jim Rempe (USA)**	**10**
**Gino Rigitano (CAN)**	**10**
Paddy Morgan (AUS)	0
**Les Dodd (ENG)**
Bye
**Colin Roscoe (WAL)**	**10**
Terry Whitthread (ENG)	2
**Mario Morra (CAN)**	**10**
Paul Gibson (ENG)	6
Eddie McLauglin (SCO)
**Dave Chalmers (ENG)**	w.o.
**Jack McLaughlin (NIR)**
Bye
John Hargreaves (ENG)	6
**Mark Bennett (WAL)**	**10**
**Jim Donnelly (SCO)**
Bye
**Ian Williamson (ENG)**
Bye
**Dave Gilbert (ENG)**
Bye
Billy Kelly (IRL)	**10**
Bernard Bennett (ENG)	0
**Jim Meadowcroft (ENG)**	**10**
Derek Mienie (RSA)	3
**Geoff Foulds (ENG)**	**10**
Paul Watchorn (IRL)	6
**Dennis Hughes (ENG)**	**10**
Maurice Parkin (ENG)	5
**Bill Oliver (ENG)**	**10**
Pascal Burke (IRL)	5
**John Dunning (ENG)**	**10**
Joe Cagianello (CAN)	7
**Robby Foldvari (AUS)**
Bye
Pat Houlihan (ENG)	4
**Jon Wright (ENG)**	**10**
Sakchai Sim Ngam (THA)
**Brian Rowswell (ENG)**	w.o.
Dessie Sheehan (IRL)	6
**Nigel Gilbert (ENG)**	**10**
**Roger Bales (ENG)**
Bye
**Jack Fitzmaurice (ENG)**	**10**
Clive Everton (ENG)	2
**David Roe (ENG)**	w.o.
Omprakesh Agrawal (IND)
Mick Fisher (ENG)	5
**Ken Owers (ENG)**	**10**

**Round 2** Best of 19 frames
**Marcel Gauvreau (CAN)**	**10**
Jim Bear (CAN)	3
**Paul Medati (ENG)**	**10**
Tony Kearney (IRL)	8
Tony Drago (MLT)	9
**Eddie Sinclair (SCO)**	**10**
**Ray Edmonds (ENG)**	**10**
Steve James (ENG)	1
**Tommy Murphy (NIR)**	**10**
Greg Jenkins (AUS)	4
**Graham Miles (ENG)**	**10**
David Greaves (ENG)	7
**Stephen Hendry (SCO)**	**10**
Mike Darrington (ENG)	7
John Rea (SCO)	9
**Jim Rempe (USA)**	**10**
Vic Harris (ENG)	6
**Gino Rigitano (CAN)**	**10**
**Steve Newbury (WAL)**	**10**
Les Dodd (ENG)	7
**Steve Duggan (ENG)**	**10**
Colin Roscoe (WAL)	7
**Tony Chappel (WAL)**	**10**
Mario Morra (CAN)	8
**Tony Jones (ENG)**	**10**
Dave Chalmers (ENG)	1
**Jimmy van Rensberg (RSA)**	**10**
Jack McLaughlin (NIR)	6
Bernie Mikkelsen (CAN)	4
**Mark Bennett (WAL)**	**10**
**Wayne Jones (WAL)**	**10**
Jim Donnelly (SCO)	3
**Ian Black (SCO)**	**10**
Ian Williamson (ENG)	8
**Dene O'Kane (NZL)**	**10**
Dave Gilbert (ENG)	2
**Matt Gibson (SCO)**	**10**
Billy Kelly (IRL)	9
**Graham Cripsey (ENG)**	**10**
Jim Meadowcroft (ENG)	9
**Danny Fowler (ENG)**	**10**
Geoff Foulds (ENG)	6
**Bob Harris (ENG)**	**10**
Dennis Hughes (ENG)	2
Patsy Fagan (IRL)	2
**Bill Oliver (ENG)**	**10**
**George Scott (ENG)**	**10**
John Dunning (ENG)	7
**Mark Wildman (ENG)**	**10**
Robby Foldvari (AUS)	5
Paddy Browne (IRL)	6
**Jon Wright (ENG)**	**10**
**Malcolm Bradley (ENG)**	**10**
Brian Rowswell (ENG)	6
**Joe O'Boye (IRL)**	**10**
Nigel Gilbert (ENG)	5
**John Spencer (ENG)**	**10**
Roger Bales (ENG)	2
**Bob Chaperon (CAN)**	**10**
Jack Fitzmaurice (ENG)	2
**Warren King (AUS)**	**10**
David Roe (ENG)	4
Fred Davis (ENG)	5
**Ken Owers (ENG)**	**10**

**Round 3** Best of 19 frames
Marcel Gauvreau (CAN)	3
**Paul Medati (ENG)**	**10**
Eddie Sinclair (SCO)	6
**Ray Edmonds (ENG)**	**10**
**Tommy Murphy (NIR)**	**10**
Graham Miles (ENG)	7
**Stephen Hendry (SCO)**	10
Jim Rempe (USA)	4
Gino Rigitano (CAN)	4
**Steve Newbury (WAL)**	**10**
Steve Duggan (ENG)	3
**Tony Chappel (WAL)**	**10**
**Tony Jones (ENG)**	**10**
Jimmy van Rensberg (RSA)	0
**Mark Bennett (WAL)**	**10**
Wayne Jones (WAL)	3
Ian Black (SCO)	2
**Dene O'Kane (NZL)**	**10**
Matt Gibson (SCO)	4
**Graham Cripsey (ENG)**	**10**
**Danny Fowler (ENG)**	**10**
Bob Harris (ENG)	5
**Bill Oliver (ENG)**	**10**
George Scott (ENG)	5
Mark Wildman (ENG)	0
**Jon Wright (ENG)**	**10**
**Malcolm Bradley (ENG)**	**10**
Joe O'Boye (IRL)	7
**John Spencer (ENG)**	**10**
Bob Chaperon (CAN)	4
**Warren King (AUS)**	**10**
Ken Owers (ENG)	4

**Round 4** Best of 19 frames
**Eugene Hughes (IRL)**	**10**
Paul Medati (ENG)	2
**Murdo MacLeod (SCO)**	**10**
Ray Edmonds (ENG)	7
**Steve Longworth (ENG)**	**10**
Tommy Murphy (NIR)	2
Dave Martin (ENG)	7
**Stephen Hendry (SCO)**	**10**
**Mike Hallett (ENG)**	**10**
Steve Newbury (WAL)	4
**John Campbell (AUS)**	**10**
Tony Chappel (WAL)	6
**John Virgo (ENG)**	**10**
Tony Jones (ENG)	9
Bill Werbeniuk (CAN)	8
**Mark Bennett (WAL)**	**10**
Peter Francisco (RSA)	5
**Dene O'Kane (NZL)**	**10**
**David Taylor (ENG)**	**10**
Graham Cripsey (ENG)	7
**John Parrott (ENG)**	**10**
Danny Fowler (ENG)	3
**Dean Reynolds (ENG)**	**10**
Bill Oliver (ENG)	7
Cliff Wilson (WAL)	4
**Jon Wright (ENG)**	**10**
**Jim Wych (CAN)**	**10**
Malcolm Bradley (ENG)	7
**Barry West (ENG)**	**10**
John Spencer (ENG)	5
Eddie Charlton (AUS)	4
**Warren King (AUS)**	**10**

== Century breaks ==
There were 18 century breaks at the championship. The highest was a 127 made by Steve Davis in the first frame of the final. This was the lowest world championship high break since the event moved to the Crucible Theatre in 1977. The highest break in 1977 was 135 by John Spencer, which was the lowest to be the highest break at the world championship until 1986, when Davis's 134 was the highest.

- 127 – Steve Davis
- 119, 114 – Jimmy White
- 112 – Rex Williams
- 109, 106, 105, 102 – Neal Foulds
- 108, 102, 101 – Joe Johnson
- 105, 103 – Mike Hallett
- 103 – Stephen Hendry
- 103 – Steve Longworth
- 101 – John Virgo
- 100 – Tony Meo
- 100 – Ray Reardon

=== Qualifying ===
There were 17 century breaks during the qualifying competition, the highest of which was 132 made by Dene O'Kane.

- 132, 130, 109, 101, 100 – Dene O'Kane
- 125 – Paul Medati
- 115 – John Parrott
- 110 – John Spencer
- 108, 105 – Stephen Hendry
- 108 – Mark Bennett
- 108 – Bill Oliver
- 107 – Joe O'Boye
- 105 – Jim Rempe
- 104 – John Campbell
- 100 – Graham Cripsey
- 100 – Gino Rigitano
