= 1986 World Snooker Championship =

Professional snooker tournament

1986 Embassy World Snooker Championship
Tournament information
- Dates: 19 April – 5 May 1986
- Venue: Crucible Theatre
- City: Sheffield
- Country: England
- Organisation: WPBSA
- Format: Ranking event
- Total prize fund: £350,000
- Winner's share: £70,000
- Highest break: Steve Davis (ENG) (134)

Final
- Champion: Joe Johnson (ENG)
- Runner-up: Steve Davis (ENG)
- Score: 18–12

The 1986 World Snooker Championship (also referred to as the 1986 Embassy World Snooker Championship for the purposes of sponsorship) was a professional snooker tournament that took place between 19 April and 5 May 1986 at the Crucible Theatre in Sheffield, England. It was the sixth and final ranking event of the 1985–86 snooker season and the 1986 edition of the World Snooker Championship, first held in 1927. The total prize fund was £350,000 with £70,000 awarded to the winner. The event was sponsored by cigarette manufacturer Embassy.

The defending champion was Dennis Taylor, who had won his first world title by defeating Steve Davis 18–17 in the 1985 World Snooker Championship final. In defence of his title, Taylor lost in the first round 6–10 to qualifier Mike Hallett. World number 16 Joe Johnson defeated Davis 18–12 in the final to win his sole ranking event. Prior to the competition, the bookmakers' odds for a Johnson victory were 150/1. There were 20 century breaks compiled in total during the tournament, the highest of which was a 134 made by Davis in the opening frame of his quarter-final win.

== Overview ==
The World Snooker Championship is an annual professional snooker tournament organised by the World Professional Billiards and Snooker Association (WPBSA). Developed in the late 19th century by British Army soldiers stationed in India, the cue sport was popular in the British Isles. However, in the modern era, which started in 1969 when the World Championship reverted to a knockout format, it has become increasingly popular worldwide, especially in East and Southeast Asian nations such as China, Hong Kong and Thailand.

Joe Davis won the first World Championship in 1927, hosted by the Billiards Association and Control Council, the final match being held at Camkin's Hall in Birmingham, England. Since 1977, the event has been held at the Crucible Theatre in Sheffield, England. The 1986 championship featured 32 professional players competing in one-on-one snooker matches in a single-elimination format, each match played over several frames. These competitors in the main tournament were selected using a combination of the top players in the snooker world rankings and the winners of a pre-tournament qualification stage. The top 16 players in the world rankings automatically qualified for the event, the remaining 16 players coming through the qualification rounds.

=== Prize fund ===
The tournament featured a total prize fund of £350,000, with £70,000 awarded to the winner. A bonus of £80,000 was reserved for the first player (if any) to make a maximum break. The prize money allocation is shown below.

==== Main tournament ====
- Winner: £70,000
- Runner-up: £42,000
- Semi-finalists: £21,000
- Quarter-finalists: £10,500
- Last 16: £5,250
- Last 32: £2,953.12
- Highest break: £7,000
- Maximum break: £80,000

==== Qualifying ====
- Fourth Qualifying round: £2,296.87
- Third Qualifying round: £1,203.12
- Highest break: £1,750

== Tournament summary ==
=== Qualifying rounds ===
Qualifying matches took place at Preston Guild Hall from 26 March to 6 April 1986. All matches were played as the best of 19 frames. Joe O'Boye recorded the first century break of the qualifying rounds, compiling a 118 in his 8–10 defeat to Bill Oliver. Paul Thornley made a 126 break in his 10–3 win over Derek Mienie. John Hargreaves was 2–9 down in his match against Bernie Mikkelsen, but won five frames in a row to recover to 7–9 before being knocked out in the next frame. Dave Gilbert also won five consecutive frames, recovering from 5–7 behind to win 10–7 against Roger Bales. Veteran professional Bernard Bennett suffered the only whitewash of the first qualifying round, failing to win any frames against Sakchai Sim Ngam. James Giannaros, Jim Rempe and Wayne Sanderson all withdrew from the competition.

In the second qualifying round, the Scottish Professional Championship winner Stephen Hendry made a break of 141 in his victory over Paddy Browne; this was the highest break in qualifying for which Hendry earned a prize of £1,750. He had led 8–3 and 9–8 before winning the match 10–9. Level at 8–8 against Bob Chaperon, Frank Jonik conceded the next frame when 22 points behind, despite the brown to black balls—totalling 22 points, enough for him to draw the game—still being on the table. He then conceded the 18th frame while 53 points behind with six reds still remaining, meaning that up to 75 points were available without requiring snookers, and lost the match 8–10. Jimmy van Rensberg beat Ian Williamson on the final black in the deciding frame of their contest, clearing green to brown to win the frame 42–41. On the way to his second-round qualifying match, Steve Newbury was involved in a traffic collision which injured his wife and wrecked his car; despite the accident, Newbury beat Omprakesh Agrawal 10–5. There was one whitewash in the second round, Ray Edmonds beating Billy Kelly 10–0.

Hendry made breaks of 117 and 91 in his 10–8 third-round defeat of Wayne Jones, during which Jones had recovered from 3–7 behind to level at 8–8. Les Dodd lost only one frame against former World Snooker Championship promoter Mike Watterson, and Peter Francisco defeated Fred Davis, a former billiards and snooker world champion, by the same margin. Robby Foldvari, who had won the 1986 WPBSA World Billiards Championship the previous month, defeated the 1974 World Snooker Championship runner-up Graham Miles 10–7. John Spencer qualified to meet another former champion, Alex Higgins, at the main stage of the competition by beating Newbury 10–7 in the final qualifying round. Hendry became the youngest-ever qualifier for the Crucible stages at the time by defeating Dene O'Kane 10–9, after having led 6–3. O'Kane was one of three top-32 seeds to be knocked out in the fourth round, the other two being Mark Wildman and Murdo MacLeod; Wildman lost 9–10, after establishing a 9–6 lead against Edmonds, while MacLeod was defeated 6–10 by Danny Fowler.

=== First round ===
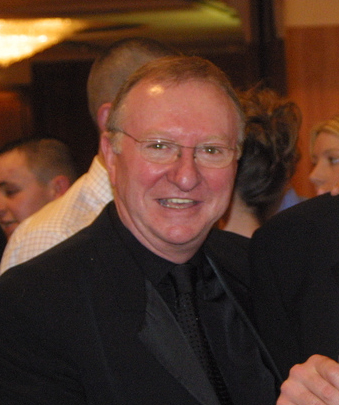
Defending champion Dennis Taylor (pictured in 2004) was knocked out in the first round.

The first round took place between 19 and 24 April, each match played over two sessions as the best of 19 frames. Defending champion Dennis Taylor, looking "jaded" according to Clive Everton, lost the first seven frames of his match against Mike Hallett, who ended the first session 8–1 ahead. Taylor won five more frames, but lost the match 6–10. Like John Spencer in 1978, Terry Griffiths in 1980, Cliff Thorburn in 1981, and Steve Davis in 1982, Taylor was unable to retain his first world title; this inability of a first-time champion to defend their title has become known as the "Crucible curse". Second seed Steve Davis beat Ray Edmonds 10–4. Third seed Thorburn beat Bill Werbeniuk 10–5, whilst fourth seed Tony Knowles won a close match against Neal Foulds 10–9.

The 16th seed Joe Johnson defeated Dave Martin 10–3 in the first round, his first win in three appearances at the World Championship. Jimmy White compiled a 121 break in the final frame of his 10–7 victory over John Virgo. Three-time world champion Spencer made his final appearance at the tournament, losing 7–10 to Alex Higgins in the first round. Future seven-time world champion Stephen Hendry made his Crucible debut, losing 8–10 to Willie Thorne in the first round. Aged 17 years and 3 months, Hendry was the youngest player ever to compete at the World Snooker Championship. Another debutant in 1986 was Danny Fowler, who lost 2–10 to Terry Griffiths. Six-time world champion Ray Reardon was knocked out 8–10 by John Campbell.

In the other first-round matches, Doug Mountjoy beat Perrie Mans 10–3, qualifier John Parrott beat Tony Meo 10–4, Kirk Stevens beat Dean Reynolds 10–6, Silvino Francisco beat Rex Williams 10–4, Eugene Hughes beat David Taylor 10–7, and Eddie Charlton beat Cliff Wilson 10–6.

=== Second round ===
The second round, which took place between 24 and 28 April, was played as best-of-25-frames matches spread over three sessions. Steve Davis and Doug Mountjoy, who had contested the 1981 final, ended their first session tied at 4–4, and their second with Davis leading 11–5. Mountjoy did not pot a ball in the final session as Davis completed a 13–5 victory. Alex Higgins missed a black ball from its spot that would have put him 6–2 ahead of Terry Griffiths at the end of their first session, but the frame went to Griffiths, leaving Higgins just 5–3 ahead. Griffiths had the better of their second session, and made a break of 110 to level at 6–6. Whilst the next two frames were shared, Griffiths fluked a red ball to win frame 15 and then went 9–7 ahead at the end of their second session. The match went to a deciding frame, with Griffiths eventually winning 13–12. The match between Kirk Stevens and Eddie Charlton also finished with a deciding frame, Stevens winning the last three frames from 10 to 12 behind, to prevail 13–12.

Joe Johnson led Mike Hallett 5–3 after their first session, on his way to completing a 13–6 win, making a break of 110 in frame 13. John Parrott and Jimmy White were level at 4–4 and 6–6, before White won a run of four frames to lead 10–6 after the second session. White then won three of the next five frames to win the match 13–8. Willie Thorne beat the Australian Professional Championship winner John Campbell 13–9. In the other second-round matches, Tony Knowles beat Silvino Francisco 13–10, and Cliff Thorburn beat Eugene Hughes 13–6.

=== Quarter-finals ===
The quarter-finals were played as best-of-25-frames matches over three sessions on 29 and 30 April. Joe Johnson led Terry Griffiths 9–7 at the end of the first day of their match. On resumption of play, Griffiths won five frames in a row to come within one frame of winning the match at 12–9. Despite his three-frame deficit, Johnson took the next four frames, making two century breaks on the way to a 13–12 victory. Steve Davis played Jimmy White in what was effectively a rematch of the 1984 World Snooker Championship final. Davis made a break of 134 in the opening frame and played consistently well in securing a 13–5 victory, White having missed a number of relatively simple pots.

Cliff Thorburn played Willie Thorne and won 13–6. The match report in The Times stated that Thorne "was never allowed to play his usual fluent game." Thorburn took a 9–3 lead, and finished the second session 11–5 ahead. During the match, his wife Barbara gave birth to their second child in the couple's native Canada. Tony Knowles played Kirk Stevens in the fourth quarter-final. The pair were level at 4–4 after the first session, and then again at 8–8 after the second. At the beginning of the final session, Knowles won five out of six frames to win the match 13–9.

=== Semi-finals ===
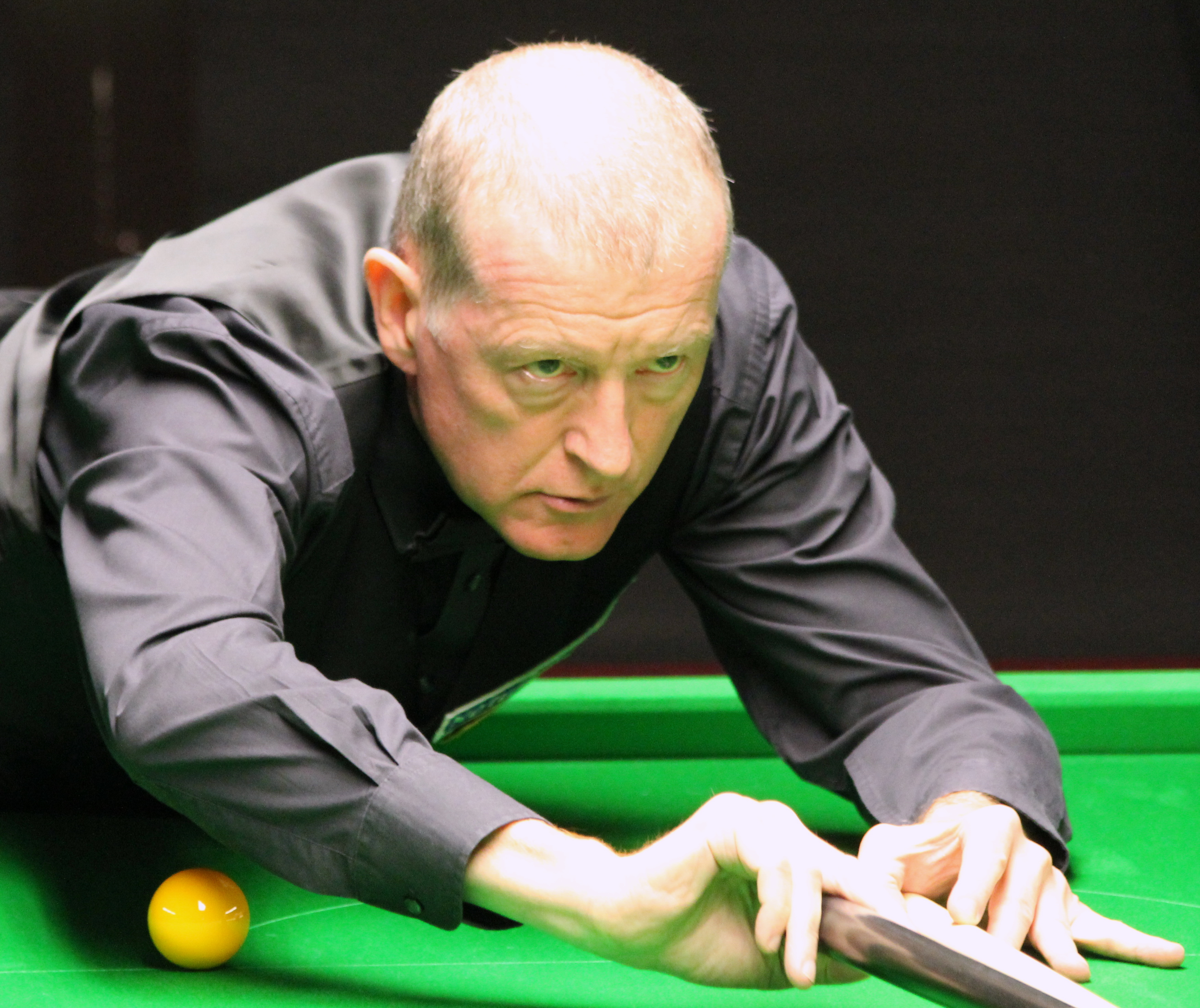
Steve Davis (pictured in 2012) defeated Cliff Thorburn 16–12 to reach his fifth World Championship final.

The semi-finals took place between 1 and 3 May as best-of-31-frames matches played over four sessions. The first semi-final was between Tony Knowles and Joe Johnson. Knowles led 1–0 and 2–1 but ended their first session 3–4 behind, having missed middle pocket pots to allow his opponent into both the sixth and seventh frames. According to Sydney Friskin's match report in The Times, Johnson appeared to be relaxed and was potting well as he built a 10–5 lead over Knowles by the end of the second session, and finished the third session 14–8 ahead. He took the first two frames of the last session to win the match 16–8, reaching his first World Championship final. Johnson won the match despite having taken painkillers for a cyst on his back before the start of play.

Steve Davis played Cliff Thorburn in the second semi-final. Leading 3–2, Thorburn was on course for a maximum break in the sixth frame but failed on the ninth black, allowing Davis to go on and win the frame and level the match at 3–3. Davis won the next three frames to lead 6–3, but his lead had dwindled to 8–7 by the end of the first day's play. Thorburn pulled ahead 9–8 and 10–9 in the third session before Davis made his fifth century break of the tournament, a 112, to tie the match at 10–10. A missed black from Davis gave Thorburn the opportunity to take the next frame, but Davis won the last of the session to draw level again at 11–11. On resumption of play, Davis won five frames against Thorburn's one, compiling a break of 122 in the last frame of the match, to secure a 16–12 victory and reach his fifth world final.

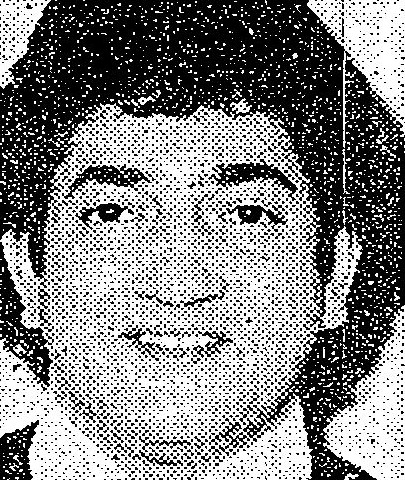
Joe Johnson, 1988

=== Final ===
The final between Steve Davis and Joe Johnson took place on 4 and 5 May. It was a best-of-35-frames match played over four sessions. The two players had never previously played a professional match against each other. Davis was considered much more likely to win the final, reflected in the bookmakers' odds of 2/9 for Davis and 5/1 for Johnson. Davis took a 3–1 lead before the first mid-session interval, making breaks of 108 and 107. Johnson then took the next three frames to finish the first session 4–3 ahead. Davis made a strong start to the second session, winning four frames in succession to put himself 7–4 ahead. After the next mid-session interval, Johnson won four consecutive frames, before Davis clinched the last frame to leave the match level at 8–8 overnight.

On the second day, Johnson wore an unusual pair of red, pink and white leather shoes. On resuming the match, he won another run of four frames to take him into a 12–8 lead, assisted by a fluke on a red ball in the 18th frame. The third session ended with Johnson 13–11 ahead. In the final session, the crowd responded in favour of Johnson, who had played with an attacking style throughout the tournament. He won three of the next four frames to lead 16–12 before the mid-session interval. Johnson then won frame 29 and secured a break of 64 in frame 30 to win the match 18–12. The win helped lift him from 16th place in the 1985‍–‍1986 professional rankings to eighth for 1986‍–‍1987.

Davis, as the World Championship runner-up for a second consecutive year, commented to interviewer David Vine, "We can't go on meeting like this, David," and Johnson later retorted, "I hope that we can still be friends." The popularity of Johnson's win resulted in an appearance on the television show Wogan, as well as an invitation to accompany Cliff Richard to watch Wimbledon in a private box. This was Johnson's only ranking event win in his career, although he would go on to win two non-ranking tournaments: the 1987 Scottish Masters and the 1989 Norwich Union Grand Prix. The two players again met in the final at the following year's championship to contest the world title for a second time, Davis winning the match 18–14. Johnson's attacking style of snooker, notable for his long potting, has been seen as a harbinger of the style that became dominant in the 1990s. The odds on Johnson were 150 to 1 against him winning the 1986 World Championship, as he had not won any tournaments in his seven-year career and had never previously won a match at the Crucible. The final attracted an average of 11.3 million viewers on BBC1, peaking at 15.6 million. A condensed version of the final was showcased on BBC Two on 22 April 2020 in place of the 2020 World Snooker Championship, which had been postponed because of the coronavirus pandemic.

== Main draw ==
The numbers in brackets denote player seedings, whilst match winners are denoted in bold. The results for the tournament are shown below:

**First round** Best of 19 frames
19 April
Dennis Taylor (NIR) (1) | 6
**Mike Hallett (ENG)** | **10**
19 & 20 April
**Joe Johnson (ENG) (16)** | **10**
Dave Martin (ENG) | 3
20 & 21 April
**Alex Higgins (NIR) (9)** | **10**
John Spencer (ENG) | 7
20 & 21 April
**Terry Griffiths (WAL) (8)** | **10**
Danny Fowler (ENG) | 2
21 & 22 April
**Kirk Stevens (CAN) (5)** | **10**
Dean Reynolds (ENG) | 6
22 & 23 April
**Eddie Charlton (AUS) (12)** | **10**
Cliff Wilson (WAL) | 6
22 & 23 April
**Silvino Francisco (RSA) (13)** | **10**
Rex Williams (ENG) | 4
23 & 24 April
**Tony Knowles (ENG) (4)** | **10**
Neal Foulds (ENG) | 9
23 & 24 April
**Cliff Thorburn (CAN) (3)** | **10**
Bill Werbeniuk (CAN) | 5
23 April
David Taylor (ENG) (14) | 7
**Eugene Hughes (IRL)** | **10**
22 April
**Willie Thorne (ENG) (11)** | **10**
Stephen Hendry (SCO) | 8
21 & 22 April
Ray Reardon (WAL) (6) | 8
**John Campbell (AUS)** | **10**
20 & 21 April
**Jimmy White (ENG) (7)** | **10**
John Virgo (ENG) | 7
20 & 21 April
Tony Meo (ENG) (10) | 4
**John Parrott (ENG)** | **10**
19 & 20 April
**Doug Mountjoy (WAL) (15)** | **10**
Perrie Mans (RSA) | 3
19 April
**Steve Davis (ENG) (2)** | **10**
Ray Edmonds (ENG) | 4

**Second round** Best of 25 frames
24 & 25 April
(England) Mike Hallett | 6
(England) **Joe Johnson (16)** | **13**
25 & 26 April
(Northern Ireland) Alex Higgins (9) | 12
(Wales) **Terry Griffiths (8)** | **13**
26, 27 & 28 April
(Canada) **Kirk Stevens (5)** | **13**
(Australia) Eddie Charlton (12) | 12
27 & 28 April
(South Africa) Silvino Francisco (13) | 10
(England) **Tony Knowles (4)** | **13**
27 & 28 April
(Canada) **Cliff Thorburn (3)** | **13**
(Republic of Ireland) Eugene Hughes | 6
26, 27 & 28 April
(England) **Willie Thorne (11)** | **13**
(Australia) John Campbell | 9
25 & 26 April
(England) **Jimmy White (7)** | **13**
(England) John Parrott | 8
24, 25 & 26 April
(Wales) Doug Mountjoy (15) | 5
(England) **Steve Davis (2)** | **13**

**Quarter-finals**; Best of 25 frames
29 & 30 April
(England) **Joe Johnson (16)** | **13**
(Wales) Terry Griffiths (8) | 12
29 & 30 April
(Canada) Kirk Stevens (5) | 9
(England) **Tony Knowles** (4) | **13**
29 & 30 April
(Canada) **Cliff Thorburn (3)** | **13**
(England) Willie Thorne (11) | 6
29 & 30 April
(England) Jimmy White (7) | 5
(England) **Steve Davis (2)** | **13**

**Semi-finals**; Best of 31 frames
1, 2 & 3 May
(England) **Joe Johnson (16)** | **16**
(England) Tony Knowles (4) | 8
1, 2 & 3 May
(Canada) Cliff Thorburn (3) | 12
(England) **Steve Davis (2)** | **16**

**Final**; Best of 35 frames
4 & 5 May
(England) **Joe Johnson (16)** | **18**
(England) Steve Davis (2) | 12

Final: (Best of 35 frames) Crucible Theatre, Sheffield, 4 & 5 May 1986. Referee: John Street
| **Joe Johnson (ENG)** (16) | | | | **18**–12 | | | | Steve Davis (ENG) (2) | | | |
Session 1: 4–3
| Frame | 1 | 2 | 3 | 4 | 5 | 6 | 7 | 8 | 9 | 10 | 11 |
| Johnson | 24 | **60**^{†} | 0 | 14 | **70**^{†} | **68**^{†} | **74**^{†} (52) | N/A | N/A | N/A | N/A |
| Davis | **85**^{†} | 49 | **108**^{†} (108) | **111**^{†} (107) | 0 | 36 | 14 | N/A | N/A | N/A | N/A |
Session 2: 4–5 (8–8)
| Frame | 1 | 2 | 3 | 4 | 5 | 6 | 7 | 8 | 9 | 10 | 11 |
| Johnson | 13 | 4 | 1 | 27 | **72**^{†} (72) | **95**^{†} | **63**^{†} | **76**^{†} (75) | 0 | N/A | N/A |
| Davis | **66**^{†} | **108**^{†} (84) | **76**^{†} (53) | **64**^{†} | 20 | 22 | 37 | 8 | **137**^{†} (81) | N/A | N/A |
Session 3: 5–3 (13–11)
| Frame | 1 | 2 | 3 | 4 | 5 | 6 | 7 | 8 | 9 | 10 | 11 |
| Johnson | **85**^{†} | **57**^{†} | **66**^{†} | **86**^{†} (61) | 35 | 31 | **70**^{†} | 7 | N/A | N/A | N/A |
| Davis | 26 | 44 | 11 | 36 | **84**^{†} (52) | **73**^{†} | 40 | **100**^{†} (100) | N/A | N/A | N/A |
Session 4: 5–1 (**18**–12)
| Frame | 1 | 2 | 3 | 4 | 5 | 6 | 7 | 8 | 9 | 10 | 11 |
| Johnson | **69**^{†} | 52 (51) | **49**^{†} | **64**^{†} (54) | **83**^{†} | **86**^{†} (64) | N/A | N/A | N/A | N/A | N/A |
| Davis | 9 | **63**^{†} | 32 | 38 | 40 | 27 | N/A | N/A | N/A | N/A | N/A |
| 75 | | | | Highest break | | | | 108 | | | |
| 0 | | | | Century breaks | | | | 3 | | | |
| 7 | | | | 50+ breaks | | | | 7 | | | |
Joe Johnson wins the 1986 World Snooker Championship; Breaks over 50 are shown in parentheses.^{†} = Winner of frame

== Qualifying ==
Four rounds of qualification for the main draw were played at the Guild Hall in Preston, England, from 26 March to 6 April 1986. All matches were played as the best of 19 frames. Players in bold denote match winners.

=== Round 1 ===
Round 1
Round 1 (Best of 19 frames)
| Winning player | Score | Defeated player |
|---|---|---|
| Dave Gilbert (ENG) | 10–7 | Roger Bales (ENG) |
| Omprakesh Agrawal (IND) | 10–6 | Dennis Hughes (ENG) |
| Tony Kearney (IRL) | 10–5 | Glen Wilkinson (AUS) |
| Bill Oliver (ENG) | 10–8 | Joe O'Boye (IRL) |
| Dessie Sheehan (IRL) | 10–7 | Pat Houlihan (ENG) |
| Matt Gibson (SCO) | 10–4 | Greg Jenkins (AUS) |
| Sakchai Sim Ngam (THA) | 10–0 | Bernard Bennett (ENG) |
| Jim Bear (CAN) | 10–8 | Pascal Burke (IRL) |
| Tony Drago (MLT) | 10–4 | Graham Cripsey (ENG) |
| Martin Smith (ENG) | 10–4 | David Greaves (ENG) |
| Barry West (ENG) | w.o.–w/d | James Giannaros (AUS) |
| Paul Thornley (CAN) | 10–3 | Derek Mienie (RSA) |
| Robbie Grace (RSA) | 10–8 | Maurice Parkin (ENG) |
| Stephen Hendry (SCO) | 10–7 | Bert Demarco (SCO) |
| Paul Watchorn (IRL) | w.o.–w/d | Jim Rempe (USA) |
| Bernie Mikkelsen (CAN) | 10–7 | John Hargreaves (ENG) |
| Mike Darrington (ENG) | w.o.–w/d | Wayne Sanderson (CAN) |

=== Round 2 ===
Round 2
Round 2 (Best of 19 frames)
| Winning player | Score | Defeated player |
|---|---|---|
| Jim Wych (CAN) | 10–6 | Tony Chappel (WAL) |
| Steve Duggan (ENG) | 10–3 | Mick Fisher (ENG) |
| Tony Jones (ENG) | 10–7 | Vic Harris (ENG) |
| Dave Gilbert (ENG) | 10–7 | Malcolm Bradley (ENG) |
| Steve Newbury (WAL) | 10–5 | Omprakesh Agrawal (IND) |
| Ian Black (SCO) | 10–8 | Bob Harris (ENG) |
| George Scott (ENG) | 10–8 | Tony Kearney (IRL) |
| Danny Fowler (ENG) | 10–8 | Bill Oliver (ENG) |
| Colin Roscoe (WAL) | 10–3 | Geoff Foulds (ENG) |
| Warren King (AUS) | 10–4 | Dessie Sheehan (IRL) |
| Matt Gibson (SCO) | 10–9 | Mario Morra (CAN) |
| Paul Medati (ENG) | 10–9 | Sakchai Sim Ngam (THA) |
| Bob Chaperon (CAN) | 10–8 | Frank Jonik (CAN) |
| Marcel Gauvreau (CAN) | 10–5 | Jim Bear (CAN) |
| Fred Davis (ENG) | 10–6 | Dave Chalmers (ENG) |
| Peter Francisco (RSA) | 10–4 | Tony Drago (MLT) |

Round 2 (Best of 19 frames)
| Winning player | Score | Defeated player |
|---|---|---|
| Jim Donnelly (SCO) | 10–6 | Martin Smith (ENG) |
| Barry West (ENG) | 10–3 | John Dunning (ENG) |
| Tommy Murphy (NIR) | 10–7 | Jack McLaughlin (NIR) |
| Paul Thornley (CAN) | 10–7 | Patsy Fagan (IRL) |
| Wayne Jones (WAL) | 10–3 | Robbie Grace (RSA) |
| Stephen Hendry (SCO) | 10–9 | Paddy Browne (IRL) |
| Eddie Sinclair (SCO) | 10–8 | Paddy Morgan (AUS) |
| Jimmy van Rensberg (RSA) | 10–9 | Ian Williamson (ENG) |
| John Rea (SCO) | 10–6 | Eddie McLaughlin (SCO) |
| Steve Longworth (ENG) | 10–7 | Paul Watchorn (IRL) |
| Graham Miles (ENG) | 10–3 | Clive Everton (WAL) |
| Robby Foldvari (AUS) | 10–6 | Gino Rigitano (CAN) |
| Mike Watterson (ENG) | 10–2 | Bernie Mikkelsen (CAN) |
| Les Dodd (ENG) | 10–6 | Jack Fitzmaurice (ENG) |
| Mike Darrington (ENG) | 10–6 | Jim Meadowcroft (ENG) |
| Ray Edmonds (ENG) | 10–0 | Billy Kelly (IRL) |

=== Rounds 3 and 4 ===
Rounds 3 and 4
Round 3 (Best of 19 frames)
| Winning player | Score | Defeated player |
|---|---|---|
| Jim Wych (CAN) | 10–5 | Steve Duggan (ENG) |
| Dave Gilbert (ENG) | 10–7 | Tony Jones (ENG) |
| Steve Newbury (WAL) | 10–2 | Ian Black (SCO) |
| Danny Fowler (ENG) | 10–7 | George Scott (ENG) |
| Warren King (AUS) | 10–5 | Colin Roscoe (WAL) |
| Paul Medati (ENG) | 10–6 | Matt Gibson (SCO) |
| Marcel Gauvreau (CAN) | 10–8 | Bob Chaperon (CAN) |
| Peter Francisco (RSA) | 10–1 | Fred Davis (ENG) |
| Barry West (ENG) | 10–5 | Jim Donnelly (SCO) |
| Tommy Murphy (NIR) | 10–3 | Paul Thornley (CAN) |
| Stephen Hendry (SCO) | 10–8 | Wayne Jones (WAL) |
| Jimmy van Rensberg (RSA) | 10–2 | Eddie Sinclair (SCO) |
| Steve Longworth (ENG) | 10–4 | John Rea (SCO) |
| Robby Foldvari (AUS) | 10–7 | Graham Miles (ENG) |
| Les Dodd (ENG) | 10–1 | Mike Watterson (ENG) |
| Ray Edmonds (ENG) | 10–5 | Mike Darrington (ENG) |

Round 4 (Best of 19 frames)
| Winning player | Score | Defeated player |
|---|---|---|
| Mike Hallett (ENG) | 10–7 | Jim Wych (CAN) |
| Dave Martin (ENG) | 10–5 | Dave Gilbert (ENG) |
| John Spencer (ENG) | 10–7 | Steve Newbury (WAL) |
| Danny Fowler (ENG) | 10–6 | Murdo MacLeod (SCO) |
| Dean Reynolds (ENG) | 10–7 | Warren King (AUS) |
| Cliff Wilson (WAL) | 10–6 | Paul Medati (ENG) |
| Rex Williams (ENG) | 10–3 | Marcel Gauvreau (CAN) |
| Neal Foulds (ENG) | 10–9 | Peter Francisco (RSA) |
| Bill Werbeniuk (CAN) | 10–8 | Barry West (ENG) |
| Eugene Hughes (IRL) | 10–7 | Tommy Murphy (NIR) |
| Stephen Hendry (SCO) | 10–9 | Dene O'Kane (NZL) |
| John Campbell (AUS) | 10–6 | Jimmy van Rensberg (RSA) |
| John Virgo (ENG) | 10–8 | Steve Longworth (ENG) |
| John Parrott (ENG) | 10–6 | Robby Foldvari (AUS) |
| Perrie Mans (RSA) | 10–7 | Les Dodd (ENG) |
| Ray Edmonds (ENG) | 10–9 | Mark Wildman (ENG) |

== Century breaks ==
There were 20 century breaks in the main stage of the tournament, the highest amount at the World Snooker Championship until the 1991 event. The highest break was a 134 made by Steve Davis.

- 134, 112, 108, 108, 107, 102, 101, 100 – Steve Davis
- 121 – Jimmy White
- 115 – Dean Reynolds
- 112 – John Virgo
- 111, 110 – Terry Griffiths
- 110, 110, 102 – Joe Johnson
- 105 – Tony Knowles
- 104 – Cliff Thorburn
- 101 – Silvino Francisco
- 100 – Willie Thorne

=== Qualifying rounds ===
There were 12 century breaks compiled in qualifying. The highest break was a 141 made by Stephen Hendry.

- 141, 117 – Stephen Hendry
- 126 – Paul Thornley
- 120 – Tony Drago
- 118 – Joe O'Boye
- 118 – Steve Longworth
- 114 – Ian Williamson
- 112, 102 – Barry West
- 111 – Vic Harris
- 108 – Martin Smith
- 105 – Robby Foldvari
