= 1989 Irish Professional Championship =

Irish Professional Championship
Tournament information
- Dates: 14–17 February 1989
- Venue: Antrim Forum
- City: Antrim
- Country: Northern Ireland
- Format: Non-ranking event
- Total prize fund: £12,000
- Winner's share: £5,000
- Highest break: Tommy Murphy (NIR) (84)

Final
- Champion: (Northern Ireland) Alex Higgins
- Runner-up: (Northern Ireland) Jack McLaughlin
- Score: 9–7

The 1989 Irish Professional Championship was a professional invitational snooker tournament, which took place between 14 and 17 February 1989 at the Antrim Forum in Antrim, Northern Ireland.

Alex Higgins won the title beating Jack McLaughlin 9–7 in the final.

== Prize fund ==
The breakdown of prize money for this year is shown below:

- Winner: £5,000
- Runner-up: £2,500
- Semi-final: £900
- Quarter-final: £450
- Round 1: £150
- Highest break: £300
- Total: £12,000

== Main draw ==
First round Best of 9 frames
(Republic of Ireland) Paul Watchorn	5
(Republic of Ireland) Pascal Burke	4
(Republic of Ireland) Tony Kearney	5
(Republic of Ireland) Billy Kelly	2
(Northern Ireland) Jackie Rea	w/o
(Republic of Ireland) Patsy Fagan	w/d
(Republic of Ireland) Paddy Browne	5
(Republic of Ireland) Dessie Sheehan	2

Quarter-finals; Best of 9 frames
(Northern Ireland) Alex Higgins	5
(Republic of Ireland) Paul Watchorn	2
(Republic of Ireland) Eugene Hughes	5
(Republic of Ireland) Tony Kearney	1
(Northern Ireland) Jack McLaughlin	5
(Northern Ireland) Jackie Rea	0
(Northern Ireland) Tommy Murphy	4
(Republic of Ireland) Paddy Browne	5

Semi-finals; Best of 11 frames
(Northern Ireland) Alex Higgins	6
(Republic of Ireland) Eugene Hughes	2
(Northern Ireland) Jack McLaughlin	6
(Republic of Ireland) Paddy Browne	3

Final; Best of 17 frames
(Northern Ireland) Alex Higgins	9
(Northern Ireland) Jack McLaughlin	7
