= 1986 Irish Professional Championship =

Irish Professional Championship
Tournament information
- Dates: 20–23 May 1986
- Venue: Maysfield Leisure Centre
- City: Belfast
- Country: Northern Ireland
- Format: Non-ranking event
- Total prize fund: £21,500
- Winner's share: £8,000
- Highest break: Alex Higgins (NIR) (96)

Final
- Champion: (Northern Ireland) Dennis Taylor
- Runner-up: (Northern Ireland) Alex Higgins
- Score: 10–7

The 1986 Strongbow Irish Professional Championship was a professional invitational snooker tournament, which took place between 20 and 23 May 1986 at the Maysfield Leisure Centre in Belfast, Northern Ireland.

Dennis Taylor won the title beating Alex Higgins 10–7 in the final.

== Prize fund ==
The breakdown of prize money for this year is shown below:

- Winner: £8,000
- Runner-up: £5,000
- Semi-final: £2,000
- Quarter-final: £800
- Round 1: £150
- Highest break: £400
- Total: £21,500

== Main draw ==
First round Best of 9 frames
(Republic of Ireland) Billy Kelly	5
(Northern Ireland) Jackie Rea	0
(Northern Ireland) Tommy Murphy	5
(Republic of Ireland) Joe O'Boye	0
(Republic of Ireland) Tony Kearney	5
(Republic of Ireland) Patsy Fagan	0
(Northern Ireland) Jack McLaughlin	5
(Republic of Ireland) Paul Watchorn	0
(Republic of Ireland) Eugene Hughes	5
(Republic of Ireland) Dessie Sheehan	0
(Republic of Ireland) Pascal Burke	5
(Republic of Ireland) Paddy Browne	4

Quarter-finals; Best of 11 frames
(Northern Ireland) Dennis Taylor	6
(Republic of Ireland) Billy Kelly	1
(Northern Ireland) Tommy Murphy	6
(Republic of Ireland) Tony Kearney	2
(Northern Ireland) Alex Higgins	6
(Northern Ireland) Jack McLaughlin	2
(Republic of Ireland) Eugene Hughes	6
(Republic of Ireland) Pascal Burke	3

Semi-finals; Best of 11 frames
(Northern Ireland) Dennis Taylor	6
(Northern Ireland) Tommy Murphy	3
(Northern Ireland) Alex Higgins	6
(Republic of Ireland) Eugene Hughes	2

Final; Best of 19 frames
(Northern Ireland) Dennis Taylor	10
(Northern Ireland) Alex Higgins	7
