= 1987 Irish Professional Championship =

Irish Professional Championship
Tournament information
- Dates: 27–30 May 1987
- Venue: Antrim Forum
- City: Antrim
- Country: Northern Ireland
- Format: Non-ranking event
- Total prize fund: £23,000
- Winner's share: £8,500
- Highest break: Dennis Taylor (NIR) (129)

Final
- Champion: (Northern Ireland) Dennis Taylor
- Runner-up: (Republic of Ireland) Joe O'Boye
- Score: 9–2

The 1987 Matchroom Irish Professional Championship was a professional invitational snooker tournament, which took place between 27 and 30 May 1987 at the Antrim Forum in Antrim, Northern Ireland.

Dennis Taylor won the title beating Joe O'Boye 9–2 in the final.

== Prize fund ==
The breakdown of prize money for this year is shown below:

- Winner: £8,500
- Runner-up: £5,000
- Semi-final: £2,500
- Quarter-final: £1,000
- Round 1: £150
- Highest break: £600
- Total: £23,000

== Main draw ==
First round Best of 9 frames
(Republic of Ireland) Dessie Sheehan	5
(Northern Ireland) Jack McLaughlin	4
(Republic of Ireland) Paddy Browne	5
(Northern Ireland) Jackie Rea	3
(Republic of Ireland) Pascal Burke	5
(Republic of Ireland) Patsy Fagan	3
(Republic of Ireland) Joe O'Boye	5
(Republic of Ireland) Billy Kelly	0
(Republic of Ireland) Eugene Hughes	5
(Republic of Ireland) Paul Watchorn	2
(Republic of Ireland) Tony Kearney	5
(Northern Ireland) Tommy Murphy	1

Quarter-finals; Best of 11 frames
(Northern Ireland) Dennis Taylor	6
(Republic of Ireland) Dessie Sheehan	3
(Republic of Ireland) Paddy Browne	6
(Republic of Ireland) Pascal Burke	2
(Northern Ireland) Alex Higgins	w/d
(Republic of Ireland) Joe O'Boye	w/o
(Republic of Ireland) Eugene Hughes	6
(Republic of Ireland) Tony Kearney	1

Semi-finals; Best of 11 frames
(Northern Ireland) Dennis Taylor	6
(Republic of Ireland) Paddy Browne	1
(Republic of Ireland) Joe O'Boye	6
(Republic of Ireland) Eugene Hughes	3

Final; Best of 17 frames
(Northern Ireland) Dennis Taylor	9
(Republic of Ireland) Joe O'Boye	2
