= 1988 Irish Professional Championship =

Irish Professional Championship
Tournament information
- Dates: 9–12 February 1988
- Venue: Antrim Forum
- City: Antrim
- Country: Northern Ireland
- Format: Non-ranking event
- Total prize fund: £14,000
- Winner's share: £5,000
- Highest break: Dennis Taylor (NIR) (131)

Final
- Champion: (Northern Ireland) Jack McLaughlin
- Runner-up: (Northern Ireland) Dennis Taylor
- Score: 9–4

The 1988 Irish Professional Championship was a professional invitational snooker tournament, which took place between 9 and 12 February 1988 at the Antrim Forum in Antrim, Northern Ireland.

Jack McLaughlin won the title beating Dennis Taylor 9–4 in the final.

== Prize fund ==
The breakdown of prize money for this year is shown below:

- Winner: £5,000
- Runner-up: £2,750
- Semi-final: £1,250
- Quarter-final: £625
- Round 1: £150
- Highest break: £350
- Total: £14,000

== Main draw ==
First round Best of 9 frames
(Northern Ireland) Jack McLaughlin	5
(Republic of Ireland) Pascal Burke	3
(Republic of Ireland) Paul Watchorn	5
(Republic of Ireland) Eugene Hughes	2
(Republic of Ireland) Joe O'Boye	5
(Republic of Ireland) Dessie Sheehan	0
(Republic of Ireland) Tony Kearney	5
(Republic of Ireland) Patsy Fagan	3
(Republic of Ireland) Paddy Browne	5
(Northern Ireland) Jackie Rea	0
(Northern Ireland) Tommy Murphy	5
(Republic of Ireland) Billy Kelly	1

Quarter-finals; Best of 11 frames
(Northern Ireland) Jack McLaughlin	6
(Republic of Ireland) Paul Watchorn	5
(Republic of Ireland) Joe O'Boye	6
(Northern Ireland) Alex Higgins	4
(Northern Ireland) Dennis Taylor	6
(Republic of Ireland) Tony Kearney	3
(Republic of Ireland) Paddy Browne	6
(Northern Ireland) Tommy Murphy	5

Semi-finals; Best of 11 frames
(Northern Ireland) Jack McLaughlin	6
(Republic of Ireland) Joe O'Boye	1
(Northern Ireland) Dennis Taylor	6
(Republic of Ireland) Paddy Browne	5

Final; Best of 17 frames
(Northern Ireland) Jack McLaughlin	9
(Northern Ireland) Dennis Taylor	4
