= 1983 Irish Professional Championship =

Irish Professional Championship
Tournament information
- Dates: 9–13 March 1983
- Venue: Maysfield Leisure Centre
- City: Belfast
- Country: Northern Ireland
- Format: Non-ranking event
- Total prize fund: £16,000
- Winner's share: £6,000
- Highest break: Alex Higgins (NIR) (132)

Final
- Champion: (Northern Ireland) Alex Higgins
- Runner-up: (Northern Ireland) Dennis Taylor
- Score: 16–11

The 1983 Smithwicks Irish Professional Championship was a professional invitational snooker tournament, which took place between 9 and 13 March 1983. The tournament was played at the Maysfield Leisure Centre in Belfast, Northern Ireland, and featured eight professional players.

Alex Higgins won the title beating Dennis Taylor 16–11 in the final.

== Prize fund ==
The breakdown of prize money for this year is shown below:

- Winner: £6,000
- Runner-up: £3,000
- Semi-final: £1,500
- Quarter-final: £750
- Round 1: £350
- Highest break: £300
- Total: £16,000

== Qualifying round ==
- (Republic of Ireland) Billy Kelly 6–3 Paul Watchorn (Republic of Ireland)
- (Republic of Ireland) Pascal Burke 6–4 Dessie Sheehan (Republic of Ireland)

== Main draw ==
Quarter-finals; Best of 11 frames
(Northern Ireland) Alex Higgins	6
(Northern Ireland) Jackie Rea	1
(Republic of Ireland) Eugene Hughes	6
(Republic of Ireland) Pascal Burke	2
(Northern Ireland) Dennis Taylor	6
(Republic of Ireland) Billy Kelly	0
(Republic of Ireland) Patsy Fagan	6
(Northern Ireland) Tommy Murphy	4

Semi-finals; Best of 11 frames
(Northern Ireland) Alex Higgins	6
(Republic of Ireland) Eugene Hughes	2
(Northern Ireland) Dennis Taylor	6
(Republic of Ireland) Patsy Fagan	1

Final; Best of 31 frames
(Northern Ireland) Alex Higgins	16
(Northern Ireland) Dennis Taylor	11
