= 1992 Irish Professional Championship =

Irish Professional Championship
Tournament information
- Dates: 18–21 May 1992
- Venue: Jury's Hotel
- City: Cork
- Country: Ireland
- Format: Non-ranking event
- Total prize fund: £9,000
- Winner's share: £3,000

Final
- Champion: (Northern Ireland) Joe Swail
- Runner-up: (Northern Ireland) Jason Prince
- Score: 9–1

The 1992 Murphys Irish Professional Championship was a professional invitational snooker tournament, which took place between 18 and 21 May 1992 at Jury's Hotel in Cork, Ireland.

Joe Swail won the title by beating Jason Prince 9–1 in the final.

== Main draw ==
Last 16; Best of 9 frames
(Northern Ireland) Joe Swail	5
(Republic of Ireland) Darren Lennox	2
(Northern Ireland) Jack McLaughlin	5
(Republic of Ireland) Anthony O'Connor	1
(Northern Ireland) Dennis Taylor	5
(Northern Ireland) Dermot McGlinchey	3
(Republic of Ireland) Stephen Murphy	5
(Republic of Ireland) Stephen O'Connor	2
(Northern Ireland) Jason Prince	5
(Republic of Ireland) Paul Watchorn	1
(Republic of Ireland) Paddy Browne	5
(Republic of Ireland) Peter Donegan	4
(Republic of Ireland) Fergal O'Brien	5
(Republic of Ireland) Ken Doherty	2
(Republic of Ireland) Eugene Hughes	5
(Republic of Ireland) Tony Kearney	0

Quarter-finals; Best of 9 frames
(Northern Ireland) Joe Swail	5
(Northern Ireland) Jack McLaughlin	4
(Northern Ireland) Dennis Taylor	5
(Republic of Ireland) Stephen Murphy	3
(Northern Ireland) Jason Prince	5
(Republic of Ireland) Paddy Browne	4
(Republic of Ireland) Fergal O'Brien	5
(Republic of Ireland) Eugene Hughes	0

Semi-finals; Best of 9 frames
(Northern Ireland) Joe Swail	5
(Northern Ireland) Dennis Taylor	3
(Northern Ireland) Jason Prince	5
(Republic of Ireland) Fergal O'Brien	3

Final; Best of 17 frames
(Northern Ireland) Joe Swail	9
(Northern Ireland) Jason Prince	1
