= Irish Professional Championship =

Tournament information
- Venue: Various
- Established: 1947
- Format: Non-ranking event
- Final year: 2007
- Final champion: (Republic of Ireland) Ken Doherty

The Irish Professional Championship was an invitational professional snooker tournament for mostly Irish and Northern Irish snooker players.

== History ==
The Irish Professional Championship was first staged in 1947 in Northern Ireland, and Jackie Rea became the inaugural champion. After that the event was held on a challenge basis, with the champion choosing his challenger. Rea won the championship every year but one until 1972, when he was beaten 28–12 by Alex Higgins. Higgins could defend the title four times in a row, before losing the title to Dennis Taylor. Taylor defended the title in the following two years. During this time the tournament was only sponsored in 1978 by Benson & Hedges and in 1979 by Smithwicks Brewery.

In 1982 the tournament was converted to a knock-out tournament. Eight players took part, and was sponsored by Smithwicks Brewery. Higgins and Taylor won nine titles between them, and their run of success in the championship was interrupted only by Jack McLaughlin, in 1988. After the 1983 event Smithwicks ended their sponsorship, and Strongbow took over for 1985 and 1986 and Matchroom for 1987. After the 1989 event the World Professional Billiards and Snooker Association withdrew their backing to national championships in form of £1,000 per player, and the event was discontinued.

In 1992 the event was revived with sponsorship by Murphy's, and for the first time, the event was held in Republic of Ireland. 34 players competed at the event. When Joe Swail and Jason Prince contested the 1992 final, it was the first time in over 20 years it featured neither Higgins or Taylor. It was held again in 1993, but was abandoned again. The event was held again between 2005 and 2007.

== Winners ==
Year	Winner	Runner-up	Final score	Venue	Season
Challenge matches
1947–1951	(Northern Ireland) Jackie Rea	various challenges	n/a		
1952	(Northern Ireland) Jack Bates	(Northern Ireland) Jackie Rea	n/a		
1952–1971	(Northern Ireland) Jackie Rea	various challenges	n/a		
1972	(Northern Ireland) Alex Higgins	(Northern Ireland) Jackie Rea	28–12	(Northern Ireland) Belfast	1971/72
1978	(Northern Ireland) Alex Higgins	(Northern Ireland) Dennis Taylor	21–7	(Northern Ireland) Belfast	1977/78
1978	(Northern Ireland) Alex Higgins	(Republic of Ireland) Patsy Fagan	21–13	(Northern Ireland) Belfast	1977/78
1979	(Northern Ireland) Alex Higgins	(Republic of Ireland) Patsy Fagan	21–12	(Northern Ireland) Belfast	1978/79
1980	(Northern Ireland) Dennis Taylor	(Northern Ireland) Alex Higgins	21–15	(Northern Ireland) Belfast	1979/80
1981	(Northern Ireland) Dennis Taylor	(Republic of Ireland) Patsy Fagan	22–21	(Northern Ireland) Coleraine	1980/81
Knockout tournaments
1982	(Northern Ireland) Dennis Taylor	(Northern Ireland) Alex Higgins	16–13	(Northern Ireland) Coleraine	1981/82
1983	(Northern Ireland) Alex Higgins	(Northern Ireland) Dennis Taylor	16–11	(Northern Ireland) Belfast	1982/83
1985	(Northern Ireland) Dennis Taylor	(Northern Ireland) Alex Higgins	10–5	(Northern Ireland) Belfast	1984/85
1986	(Northern Ireland) Dennis Taylor	(Northern Ireland) Alex Higgins	10–7	(Northern Ireland) Belfast	1985/86
1987	(Northern Ireland) Dennis Taylor	(Republic of Ireland) Joe O'Boye	9–2	(Northern Ireland) Antrim	1986/87
1988	(Northern Ireland) Jack McLaughlin	(Northern Ireland) Dennis Taylor	9–4	(Northern Ireland) Antrim	1987/88
1989	(Northern Ireland) Alex Higgins	(Northern Ireland) Jack McLaughlin	9–7	(Northern Ireland) Antrim	1988/89
1992	(Northern Ireland) Joe Swail	(Northern Ireland) Jason Prince	9–1	(Republic of Ireland) Cork	1991/92
1993	(Republic of Ireland) Ken Doherty	(Republic of Ireland) Stephen Murphy	9–2	(Republic of Ireland) Cork	1992/93
2005	(Northern Ireland) Joe Swail	(Republic of Ireland) Ken Doherty	9–7	(Republic of Ireland) Templeogue	2005/06
2006	(Republic of Ireland) Ken Doherty	(Republic of Ireland) Michael Judge	9–4	(Republic of Ireland) Templeogue	2006/07
2007	(Republic of Ireland) Ken Doherty	(Republic of Ireland) Fergal O'Brien	9–2	(Republic of Ireland) Dublin	2007/08

== See also ==
- Irish Masters
- Irish Open
- Northern Ireland Trophy
- Irish Classic
- 2011 Alex Higgins International Trophy
- Northern Ireland Open
