= Jack McLaughlin =

Northern Irish snooker player

Personal information
- Born: 29 January 1959 (age 67) Lurgan, Northern Ireland

Sport
- Country: Northern Ireland
- Sport: Snooker
- Professional: 1984–1995
- Highest ranking: 49 (1990–1992)
- Best ranking finish: Quarter-final (x1)

Jack McLaughlin (born 29 January 1959) is a Northern Irish former professional snooker and billiards player from Lurgan. McLaughlin is most notable for winning the 1988 Irish Professional Championship.

== Career ==
McLaughlin turned professional in 1985 at the age of 26 after being Northern Ireland Amateur Champion in 1983 and 1984. McLaughlin's most notable moment came in the 1988 Irish Professional Championship in Antrim when he was the surprise winner of the tournament. After defeating Pascal Burke, Paul Watchorn and Joe O'Boye, he faced 1985 World Snooker Champion Dennis Taylor in the final. Despite being a huge underdog, McLaughlin won the match 9–4 to become the first winner other than Taylor or Alex Higgins in sixteen years. The following season he came close to defending his title, but lost 7–9 to Higgins.

Outside of this win, McLaughlin's best ranking finish as a professional was reaching the quarter-final of the 1989 Dubai Classic where he was defeated 5-1 by Danny Fowler.

McLaughlin left the professional game in 1995. After continuing to play amateur snooker he took up billiards in 2011, most notably reaching the final of the UK Seniors event in 2014.

Now working as a prison governor, he plays golf in his spare time as a leisure pursuit with his wife Lynne.

== Performance and rankings timeline ==
Tournament	1984/ 85	1985/ 86	1986/ 87	1987/ 88	1988/ 89	1989/ 90	1990/ 91	1991/ 92	1992/ 93	1993/ 94	1994/ 95
Ranking	(Note: New players on the Main Tour do not have a ranking.)	69	71	50	64	58	49	49	54	58	77
Ranking tournaments
Dubai Classic	Tournament Not Held				NR	QF	1R	LQ	LQ	LQ	LQ
Grand Prix	1R	1R	2R	1R	3R	1R	LQ	LQ	LQ	LQ	LQ
UK Championship	1R	1R	1R	LQ	1R	1R	LQ	LQ	1R	LQ	LQ
European Open	Tournament Not Held				1R	1R	2R	2R	LQ	LQ	LQ
Welsh Open	Tournament Not Held							LQ	1R	LQ	LQ
International Open (Note: The event ran under different names such as the Matchroom Trophy (1985/1986).)	LQ	LQ	1R	LQ	1R	1R	Not Held		LQ	1R	LQ
Thailand Open (Note: The event ran under different names such as Asian Open (1991/1992 to 1992/1993) and Thailand Open (1993/1994 to 1994/1995).)	Non-Ranking Event			Not Held		1R	3R	LQ	1R	LQ	LQ
British Open	LQ	1R	2R	LQ	LQ	LQ	1R	LQ	LQ	LQ	LQ
World Championship	WD	LQ	LQ	LQ	LQ	LQ	LQ	LQ	LQ	LQ	LQ
Non-ranking tournaments
The Masters	A	A	A	A	A	A	LQ	LQ	LQ	LQ	LQ
Former ranking tournaments
Canadian Masters	Tournament Not Held				LQ	Tournament Not Held					
Hong Kong Open	Tournament Not Held					1R	Tournament Not Held				
Classic	LQ	1R	1R	1R	1R	2R	1R	2R	Not Held		
Strachan Open	Tournament Not Held							1R	Not Held		
Former non-ranking tournaments
Irish Masters	Tournament Not Held				1R	Tournament Not Held					
Shoot-Out	Tournament Not Held						1R	Tournament Not Held			
World Masters	Tournament Not Held						LQ	Tournament Not Held			
Irish Professional Championship	LQ	QF	1R	W	F	Not Held		QF	QF	Not Held	

Performance table legend
LQ	lost in the qualifying draw	#R	lost in the early rounds of the tournament (WR = Wildcard round, RR = Round robin)	QF	lost in the quarter-finals
SF	lost in the semi–finals	F	lost in the final	W	won the tournament
DNQ	did not qualify for the tournament	A	did not participate in the tournament	WD	withdrew from the tournament

NH / Not Held	means an event was not held.
NR / Non-Ranking Event	means an event is/was no longer a ranking event.
R / Ranking Event	means an event is/was a ranking event.
MR / Minor-Ranking Event	means an event is/was a minor-ranking event.

== Career finals ==
=== Non-ranking finals: 2 (1 title) ===
Outcome	No.	Year	Championship	Opponent in the final	Score
Winner	1.	1988	Irish Professional Championship	(Northern Ireland) Dennis Taylor	9–4
Runner-up	1.	1989	Irish Professional Championship	(Northern Ireland) Alex Higgins	7–9

=== Amateur finals: 2 (2 titles) ===
Outcome	No.	Year	Championship	Opponent in the final	Score
Winner	1.	1983	Northern Ireland Amateur Championship	(Northern Ireland) John McIntyre	10–4
Winner	2.	1984	Northern Ireland Amateur Championship (2)	(Northern Ireland) Harry Morgan	10–3
