= Tommy Murphy (snooker player) =

Northern Ireland snooker player

Personal information
- Born: 8 January 1962 (age 64) Derry, Northern Ireland

Sport
- Country: Northern Ireland
- Sport: Snooker
- Professional: 1981–1994
- Highest ranking: 42 (1988/1989)
- Best ranking finish: Last 16 (x2)

Tommy Murphy (born 8 January 1962) is a Northern Irish former professional snooker player.

== Career ==
Murphy won the Northern Ireland Amateur Championship and All-Ireland Amateur Championship in 1981. Before turning professional, Murphy was an apprentice coffin-maker. In 1987, Willie Thorne made a maximum break against Murphy in the UK Championship. Although this was the first maximum in almost four years, it was not televised.

As a professional, Murphy's best ranking finishes were last 16 appearances at the 1987 British Open and the 1988 Classic. At the Irish Professional Championship in 1982 and 1986 he reached the semi-final, on both occasions being defeated by eventual champion Dennis Taylor. He also represented Northern Ireland at their infamous World Cup campaign. Teaming up with Taylor and Alex Higgins, Northern Ireland reached the final which ended with defeat to Canada and Higgins threatening to have Taylor shot.

This was Murphy's last notable appearance at a tournament, and he lost his professional status in 1994.

== Performance and rankings timeline ==
Tournament	1981/ 82	1982/ 83	1983/ 84	1984/ 85	1985/ 86	1986/ 87	1987/ 88	1988/ 89	1989/ 90	1990/ 91	1991/ 92	1992/ 93	1993/ 94
Ranking	(Note: New players on the Main Tour do not have a ranking.)	(Note: He was not on the Main Tour.)		55	58	57	44	42	57	75	90	150	228
Ranking tournaments
Dubai Classic	Tournament Not Held							NR	LQ	1R	LQ	LQ	A
Grand Prix (Note: The event ran under different names such as Professional Players Tournament (1982/1983 to 1983/1984).)	NH	1R	2R	1R	LQ	LQ	LQ	LQ	LQ	LQ	LQ	LQ	A
UK Championship	Non-Ranking Event			1R	1R	1R	2R	1R	1R	LQ	LQ	LQ	A
European Open	Tournament Not Held							1R	LQ	LQ	LQ	A	A
Welsh Open	Tournament Not Held										LQ	LQ	A
International Open	NR	LQ	LQ	LQ	2R	1R	1R	1R	1R	Not Held		A	A
Thailand Open (Note: The event ran under different names such as Asian Open (1991/1992 to 1992/1993) and Thailand Open (1993/1994 to 1996/1997).)	Not Held		Non-Ranking Event				Not Held		LQ	LQ	LQ	LQ	A
British Open	Not Held			1R	LQ	3R	1R	LQ	2R	LQ	LQ	WD	A
World Championship	LQ	LQ	LQ	LQ	LQ	LQ	LQ	LQ	LQ	LQ	LQ	LQ	LQ
Non-ranking tournaments
The Masters	A	A	A	A	A	A	A	A	A	LQ	A	A	A
Former ranking tournaments
Canadian Masters	Tournament Not Held							LQ	Tournament Not Held				
Hong Kong Open	Tournament Not Held								LQ	Tournament Not Held			
Classic	NR		LQ	LQ	1R	1R	3R	1R	1R	LQ	LQ	Not Held	
Strachan Open	Tournament Not Held										LQ	Not Held	
Former non-ranking tournaments
UK Championship	LQ	LQ	1R	Ranking Event									
British Open (Note: The event run under different names such as International Masters (1981/1982-1983/1984))	LQ	A	LQ	Ranking Event									
Shoot-Out	Tournament Not Held									2R	Not Held		
Irish Professional Championship	SF	QF	NH	QF	SF	1R	QF	QF	Not Held		LQ	LQ	A

Performance table legend
LQ	lost in the qualifying draw	#R	lost in the early rounds of the tournament (WR = Wildcard round, RR = Round robin)	QF	lost in the quarter-finals
SF	lost in the semi–finals	F	lost in the final	W	won the tournament
DNQ	did not qualify for the tournament	A	did not participate in the tournament	WD	withdrew from the tournament

NH / Not Held	means an event was not held.
NR / Non-Ranking Event	means an event is/was no longer a ranking event.
R / Ranking Event	means an event is/was a ranking event.
MR / Minor-Ranking Event	means an event is/was a minor-ranking event.

== Career finals ==
=== Team finals: 1 ===
Outcome	No.	Year	Championship	Team/partner	Opponent(s) in the final	Score
Runner-up	1.	1990	World Cup	Northern Ireland	Canada	5–9

=== Amateur finals: 2 (2 titles) ===
Outcome	No.	Year	Championship	Opponent in the final	Score
Winner	1.	1981	Northern Ireland Amateur Championship	(Northern Ireland) Billy Mills	4–3
Winner	2.	1981	All-Ireland Amateur Championship	(Republic of Ireland) Anthony Kearney	5–2
