= Pascal Burke =

Irish snooker player

Personal information
- Born: 19 June 1932
- Died: 2001 (aged 68)

Sport
- Country: Ireland
- Sport: Snooker
- Professional: 1982–1991
- Highest ranking: 63

Pascal Burke (19 June 1932 – 2001) was an Irish professional snooker player. He played professionally from 1982 to 1991.

== Career ==
As an amateur, Burke was the Republic of Ireland snooker champion in 1974 and 1976, and the billiards champion in 1980 and 1981. He reached the semi-finals of the 1974 World Amateur Snooker Championship, and was invited to participate in the 1974 Norwich Union Open, where he lost 2–5 to Ray Reardon, the reigning professional World Snooker Champion.

Burke was accepted as a member by the World Professional Billiards and Snooker Association (WPBSA) in 1982. His first professional tournament was the 1983 Irish Professional Championship, where he lost 2–6 to Eugene Hughes. Invited to the 1983 Irish Masters, he lost 0–5 to Tony Meo. He also lost in the first match of his third and final tournament of his first season, defeated 9–10 by Paddy Morgan in the qualifying round of the 1983 World Snooker Championship.

He started the 1983–84 snooker season with a 2–5 loss to Geoff Foulds in the qualifying for the 1983 International Open, but then defeated Foulds 5–4 in qualifying for the 1983 Professional Players Tournament, before losing 3–5 to Joe Johnson. In the qualifying rounds of the 1984 World Snooker Championship he eliminated Billy Kelly 10-7 and Bob Harris 10-4 but was then knocked out 10–5 by Mike Hallett. This remained Burke's best progression at the World Championship.

After several further seasons where he did not achieve any significant tournament success, Burke finished the 1990–91 snooker season ranked 149, and did not compete professionally again. His highest ranking achieved as a professional was 63. He died in 2001 aged 68, in hospital in Dublin, after a short illness.
