= Dessie Sheehan =

Irish snooker player

Personal information
- Born: 3 September 1949 (age 77) Limerick, Ireland

Sport
- Country: (Republic of Ireland) Ireland
- Sport: Snooker
- Professional: 1981–1997, 1998/1999, 2000/2001
- Highest ranking: 81 (1986/1987)

Dessie Sheehan (born 3 September 1949 in Limerick) is an Irish former professional snooker player.

== Career ==
Born in 1949, Sheehan turned professional in 1981. His first match was a 5–1 victory over Vic Harris in the International Open, but he lost all of his other matches during the 1981/1982 season, finishing it with a 5–9 defeat to Dean Reynolds in qualifying for the 1982 World Championship.

The next several seasons came without any success, although Sheehan reached the last 64 at the 1983 Professional Players' Tournament, where Rex Williams beat him 5–1.

In the 1985 UK Championship, he defeated Paul Watchorn 9–7 and George Scott 9–6 and was drawn against Steve Davis in the last 64. Sheehan made a break of 92 in the seventh frame, but won only that frame and was eliminated from the tournament, losing the match 9–1 to Davis. By the end of the season, having earned £1,878 in prize money, he had accumulated enough ranking points to be placed 81st, a career best, for the 1986/1987 season.

That season saw Sheehan record his only quarter-final finish, beating Jack McLaughlin in his first-round match at the 1987 Irish Professional Championship before losing 3–6 to Dennis Taylor.

Slipping down the rankings, Sheehan entered a few tournaments during the 1990s, and earned no prize money after the 1992/1993 season. Ranked 451st, he lost his professional status when the secondary UK Tour was introduced in 1997.

The next four seasons brought only entries in the World Championship; Sheehan lost all of his first-round qualifying matches, although he held a ranking position during the 1998/1999 and 2000/2001 seasons.

Having played in only one event - the 2007 Irish Professional Championship - in twelve years, Sheehan entered Q-School in 2012 in an attempt to re-qualify for the main tour. He had earlier entered four PTC tournaments during the 2011/2012 season, losing to Joel Walker, Chris Norbury, Zak Surety and Anthony Cronin, and showed no better form at Q-School, where he was defeated 4–0 by Vinnie Calabrese, 4–1 by Saqib Nasir and 4–0 by Scott Donaldson.

The following season, he again played in the PTC events, but lost three of his four matches, to Allan Taylor, Joe Swail and Nico Elton respectively. At Q-School in 2013, he lost 4–0 to Steven Hallworth, 4–1 to Michael Georgiou and 4–0 to Josh Boileau.

At the Lisbon Open in December 2014, Sheehan won two matches to reach the last 128, where he was drawn against fellow veteran Jimmy White. In their match, White compiled breaks of 66 and 96 and beat Sheehan 4–0. His Q-School efforts in 2014 resulted in defeats to William Lemons and Duane Jones.
