= Billy Kelly (snooker player) =

English snooker player

Personal information
- Born: 1 May 1945 (age 81)

Sport
- Country: Ireland
- Sport: Snooker
- Professional: 1981–1992
- Highest ranking: 54

Billy Kelly (born 1 May 1945) is an Irish former professional snooker player. He played professionally from 1981 to 1992.

== Career ==
Kelly was born on 1 May 1945. In 1977, he won the CIU championship, regarded as the second-most prestigious amateur competition after the English Amateur Championship, and the Autumn Pontins Open.

He was accepted as a member by the World Professional Billiards and Snooker Association (WPBSA) in 1981. His first professional tournament was the 1981 International Open, where he lost 1–5 to Murdo MacLeod in the first qualifying round. He also lost in his first qualifying matches at the 1981 UK Championship (7–9 to Geoff Foulds); the 1982 Irish Professional Championship (1–6 to Tommy Murphy); and the 1982 World Snooker Championship (8-9 to Eddie Sinclair). Although he recorded a number of match victories in the following seasons, he did not reach further than the last 32 of a major tournament. He compiled a break of 141 against Tony Kearney in the qualifying rounds of the 1988 World Snooker Championship that was, at the time, the highest break ever made in the world championship qualifying rounds.

In 1990, Kelly was due to lose his professional status after being defeated 7–10 by Jason Ferguson in a play-off match, one of a series of matches where the lowest-ranked professionals faced leading amateurs with places on the professional tour at stake. However, the WPBSA soon opened membership for events to anyone over the age of 16 that paid the relevant fee, and Kelly continued to play in professional tournaments until 1992, finishing the 1991–92 snooker season ranked 188th. He also entered the World Snooker Championships in 2002, 2003, 2005, 2009 and 2013.

His highest ranking achieved as a professional was 54.

== Career highlights ==
Outcome	No.	Year	Championship	Opponent in the final	Score	Ref.
Winner	1.	1977	Pontins Autumn Open	George Scott (ENG)	7–5	
