= Paul Watchorn =

Irish musician and snooker player

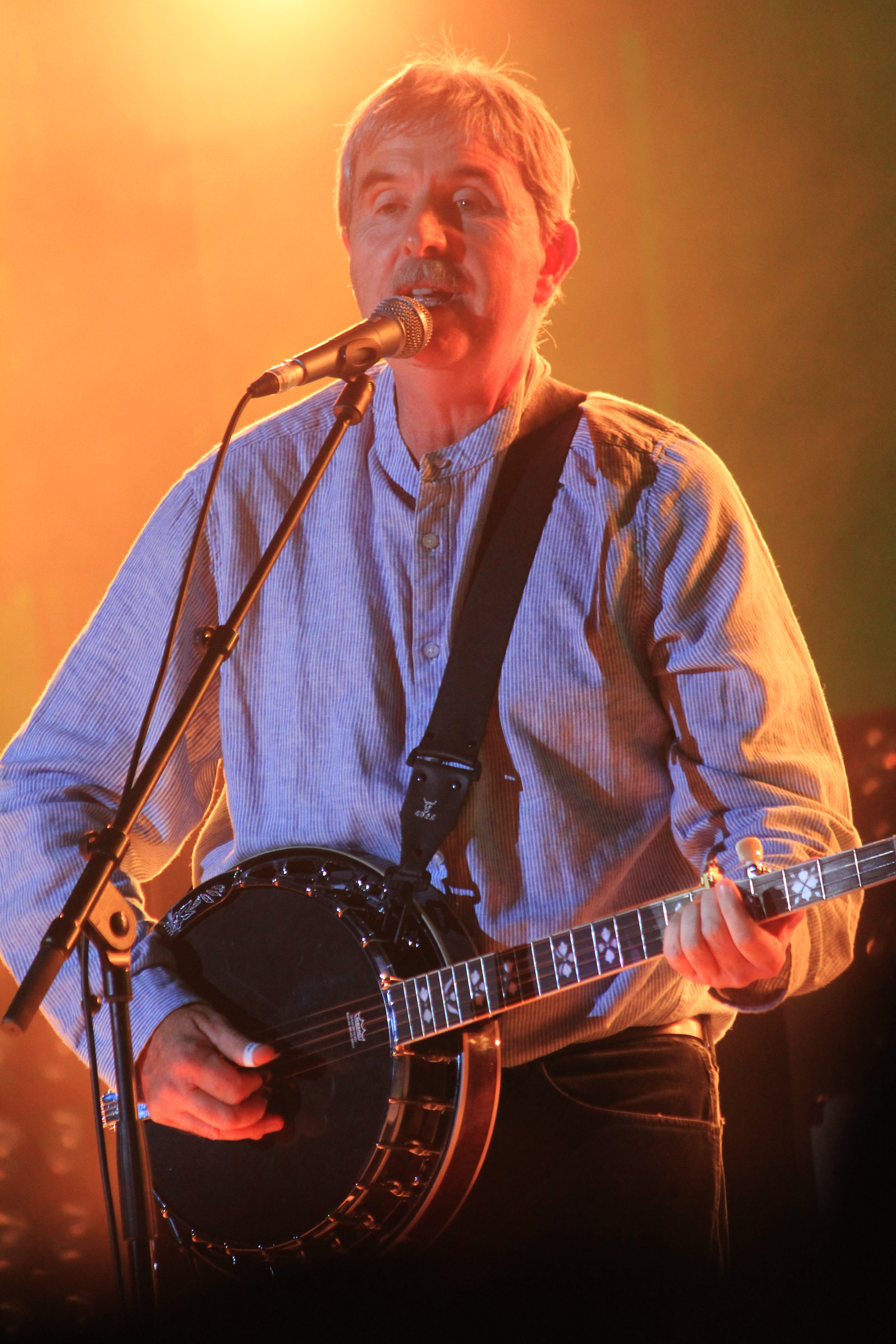
- Paul Watchorn in 2014

Background information
- Born: Paul Watchorn; 19 July 1958 (age 67); Crumlin, Dublin, Ireland
- Origin: Dublin, Ireland
- Genres: Irish folk
- Occupations: Snooker player, musician
- Instruments: Vocals, banjo, guitar
- Formerly of: The Dubliners; The Dublin Legends

Paul Watchorn (born 19 July 1958) is an Irish folk musician and former professional snooker player. He previously played with Derek Warfield. He currently plays with the band The Dublin Legends who were members of The Dubliners, a band in which his older brother Patsy Watchorn was a member. Watchorn was a professional snooker player from 1982 to 1995, retiring after 13 seasons as a professional.
