= 2017 Masters (snooker) =

Professional non-ranking snooker tournament, Jan 2017

2017 Dafabet Masters

Tournament information
- Dates: 15–22 January 2017
- Venue: Alexandra Palace
- City: London
- Country: England
- Organisation: World Snooker
- Format: Non-ranking event
- Total prize fund: £600,000
- Winner's share: £200,000
- Highest break: Marco Fu (HKG) (141)

Final
- Champion: Ronnie O'Sullivan (ENG)
- Runner-up: Joe Perry (ENG)
- Score: 10–7

The 2017 Masters (officially the 2017 Dafabet Masters) was a professional non-ranking snooker tournament that took place from 15 to 22 January 2017 at Alexandra Palace in London, England. It was the 43rd staging of the Masters and the second Triple Crown event of the 2016/17 snooker season, following the 2016 UK Championship and preceding the 2017 World Snooker Championship.

Ronnie O'Sullivan was the defending champion, having defeated Barry Hawkins 10–1 in the final of the 2016 event. O'Sullivan reached a record-extending 12th Masters final and successfully defended his title, defeating Joe Perry 10–7 to win the tournament for a record seventh time, surpassing the six titles won by Stephen Hendry. This was the first successful title defence at the Masters since Paul Hunter in 2002. Marco Fu compiled the highest break of the tournament, scoring a 141 in his semi-final match against O'Sullivan.

== Prize fund ==
The event saw identical prize money to that of the previous year's event, with a total of £600,000 total prize pool. The "rolling 147 prize" for a maximum break stood at £10,000, but went unclaimed. The breakdown of prize money is shown below:

- Winner: £200,000
- Runner-up: £90,000
- Semi-finals: £50,000
- Quarter-finals: £25,000
- Last 16: £12,500
- Highest break: £10,000
- Total: £600,000

== Overview ==
The 2017 Masters tournament was an invitational non-ranking event held at Alexandra Palace from 15 to 22 January 2017, and saw the 16 highest ranked players in the snooker world rankings compete, with no qualification round. As defending champion, Ronnie O'Sullivan was awarded number one seed with World Champion Mark Selby seeded second. The remaining places allocated to players were based on the world rankings after the 2016 UK Championship. The event was the second Triple Crown event of the 2016/17 snooker season following the UK Championship and the 43rd staging of the Masters. The event was sponsored by sports betting company dafabet, who had sponsored the event since 2014.

Ranked 21st, Stephen Maguire failed to secure entry to the tournament for the first time since 2004. Maguire later qualified to play in the 2019 event. The event saw one debutant, Kyren Wilson who was seeded 16th. All matches, excluding the final were played as best-of-11-frames, whereas the final was played as a best-of-19-frames match played over two sessions.

== Tournament summary ==
=== First round ===
The first round of the competition was played from 15 to 18 January 2017. Defending champion O'Sullivan drew Liang Wenbo (seeded 12) in the first round. Wenbo had made his debut in the competition the previous year, losing 4–6 to John Higgins in the first round. This time he fought back from 2–4 behind, to lead 5–4, and required the final black ball in frame 10 to win the match, but he missed the shot, allowing O'Sullivan to tie 5–5. O'Sullivan then made a break of 121 in the deciding frame to win the match. Afterwards, O'Sullivan claimed that he felt ill during the match, and had been looking forward to "a nice week off".

The 2012 Masters champion Neil Robertson (8) played Ali Carter (13), with the winner to face O'Sullivan in the quarter-finals. In a low-scoring match, Robertson took a 4–1 lead, before Carter claimed the next two frames to reduce his deficit to 4–3. Robertson took the next two frames, scoring a break of 117 in the ninth, to win the match 6–3. Fifth seed Judd Trump played 2011 runner-up Marco Fu (14). Trump took leads of 3–0 and 4–2 over Fu, and later led 5–4, but Fu took the last two frames to claim the victory. The match, which saw fourteen 50+ breaks, was described by 1991 World champion and snooker pundit John Parrott as "an absolutely wonderful spectacle"; he also commented that 39-year-old Fu was "playing the best snooker of his career".

Two-time champion John Higgins (4) played Mark Allen (10), with the victor meeting Fu in the second-round. Higgins, who last won the title in 2006, had been eliminated in the first round on twelve occasions prior to this year's tournament. He took the first two frames of the match, including a break of 111, but the score later tied at 4–4 with Allen securing a break of 104. In the ninth frame, Allen lost a 67-point advantage by missing a blue into the middle pocket, allowing Higgins to build a break of 67 thus forcing a re-spotted black. Allen potted the black from a long-range shot to take a 5–4 lead, but a 77 break from Higgins in the next frame drew them level at five all. Both players missed shots in the final frame, until Allen compiled a break of 44 to eventually win the match 6–5.

World number two Stuart Bingham (3) met Joe Perry (9) in the fifth of the first round matches. Despite being the lower seed, Perry inflicted a 6–1 defeat on Bingham, who had become a father for the second time two days before the match. Perry won the first frame of the match, before clinching the second on a respotted black. Bingham made a 132 break in the third, to win his only frame of the match, before Perry took the next four frames for the victory. Ding Junhui (6) was drawn against Kyren Wilson (16), who was making his debut appearance at the Masters. Since winning the 2011 title, Ding had failed to progress beyond the first round in the five intervening Masters tournaments. He defeated Wilson 6–3, to set up his first Masters quarter-final match in six years, which would be against Perry in the next round.

Former Masters champion, Shaun Murphy (7) drew Barry Hawkins (11) in the first round. Hawkins "thrashed" Murphy 6–1, according to the BBC. In the last of the first round matches, reigning UK and world champion Mark Selby (2) drew two-time Masters winner Mark Williams (15). Prior to the tournament, Selby had commented on the prospect of holding all three Triple Crown titles simultaneously, a feat that has only been achieved on four previous occasions. He took a lead of 3–1, before Williams later tied the match at 3–3; the two players shared the next four frames to level the score again at 5–5, leading to a final-frame decider. Despite gaining an advantage in the last frame, Williams experienced a kick on the blue ball, allowing Selby to make an 89 clearance to win the match 6–5. Pundit John Parrott later expressed sympathy for Williams, and commented that a kick "is a horrible way to lose" a match.

=== Quarter-finals ===
The quarter-finals of the competition, played on 19 and 20 January 2017, saw the remaining eight players compete in best of 11 frame matches. In the first quarter-final, Ronnie O'Sullivan defeated Neil Robertson 6–3. Robertson won the first frame with a break of 74, before O'Sullivan took frames 2 and 3 with two 50+ breaks, later moving into a 4–3 lead. He fluked a red ball in frame eight and clinched the frame; he then secured the win with a 68 break in frame nine. Despite winning, O'Sullivan commented that he had not played well, and accused himself of "missing too many easy balls".

Marco Fu defeated Mark Allen 6–2, to set up a semi-final encounter with O'Sullivan in the next round. Fu took a 3–0 lead, with breaks of 83 and 74. Allen won frames four and five with two more 50+ breaks, but Fu took the next three frames to win the match. He made a 140 break in the winning frame, which was the highest break of the tournament up to that point. In the third quarter-final, Joe Perry defeated former champion Ding Junhui 6–1, after making a 127 break in frame seven. The BBC described the result as a "shock win".

Barry Hawkins defeated Mark Selby 6–3 in the last quarter-final. Hawkins took an early 3–1 lead, and then led 4–2, before Selby scored a break of 101 to reduce his deficit to one frame, at 4–3. Hawkins, however, took both frames eight and nine to win the match. He commented afterwards that his first round victory over Shaun Murphy had given him the confidence to win his quarter-final, and defeat the world number one.

=== Semi-finals ===
The semi-finals took place on 21 January 2017. The first semi-final saw Ronnie O'Sullivan reach a record 12th Masters final by defeating Marco Fu 6–4. The two players shared the first two frames, before Fu made a break of 110 in frame three. O'Sullivan's cue tip was damaged during this third frame, so the match headed into an early mid-session interval (usually held after the fourth frame) to allow him to replace the tip. With his cue repaired, O'Sullivan made a break of 95 in the next frame to tie the match at 2–2. In the fifth frame of the match, Fu compiled the tournament's highest break, a 141, to take a 3–2 lead. O'Sullivan won frame six with a break of 122 for a 3–3 tie, and the pair remained tied after the next two frames, at 4–4. O'Sullivan won frames nine and ten to win the match and secure his place in the final.

After his victory, O'Sullivan referred to the match as "probably the best match [he had] won", while Fu commented that it was "a joy to be involved in a match like this." BBC Sport pundit, and six-time world champion Steve Davis called it a "magnificent performance", and commented that Fu's performance was "fantastic".

The second semi-final saw Joe Perry reach his first Triple Crown tournament final by defeating Barry Hawkins 6–5. Perry led the match at 2–1, but then lost four frames in a row to trail 2–5. Going into frame eight, Perry hit a double kiss from the break off shot, allowing Hawkins to gain a lead in the frame, eventually scoring 64 points. At 64–20 in the frame and with 43 points remaining, Perry required a snooker to avoid losing the match. He potted a red and black, and played the snooker on the last red; Hawkins missed the shot, and left a free ball. After potting a brown as his free ball, Perry cleared the table to win the frame, now trailing 3–5. He then also won frames nine and ten with two 50+ breaks, to level the match at 5–5, thus forcing a deciding frame. Hawkins made a break of 50 in the final frame, but ran out of position and attempted a double to continue the break, which he missed. Perry then made a break of 70 to win the match.

By winning the semi-final, Perry booked a place in the first major championship final of his career, having previously won only one ranking event, the 2015 Players Tour Championship Grand Final. He called the match the "best win of [his] career", while Hawkins said that he was "devastated" by the result.

=== Final ===
The final was played on 22 January 2017, as a best of 19 frames match, and was spread over an afternoon session and an evening session. Joe Perry was making his debut in a Triple Crown event final, whilst O'Sullivan had won the event on six previous occasions. Perry won the first two frames of the final, and later took a 4–1 lead, scoring four 50+ breaks, including a 115 break in frame five. In the next frame, he missed a shot on a relatively easy red ball that would have clinched the frame, but O'Sullivan won the frame to trail 4–2. He also took the remaining two frames of the session to tie the match 4–4.

In the evening, O'Sullivan took a commanding lead, winning the first four frames of the session (thus winning seven frames in a row overall) to lead 4–8, thanks to three 50+ breaks. With O'Sullivan two frames away from the championship, Perry won the next two frames with breaks of 117 and 92, to trail 6–8. Frame 15 gave O'Sullivan a 6–9 lead, with a break of 112, taking him one frame from victory. Perry won the next frame, but O'Sullivan took frame 17 to win the match, and his seventh Masters championship title.

After winning the tournament, O'Sullivan praised Perry, saying: "Joe played a brilliant tournament, a really good match and he should've beaten me. I got lucky – I stole it." O'Sullivan also broke the record for most Masters wins, previously tied (at six) with Stephen Hendry. O'Sullivan commented, "It is great to get some records, I still have the World Championship one to get", referring to Hendry's superior seven world championship titles.

In winning the event, O'Sullivan was presented with the Paul Hunter Trophy, named after three-time winner Paul Hunter who died of cancer in 2006. World Snooker chairman Barry Hearn commented that they had "made a mistake" in not naming the trophy after Hunter previously, despite the German Open having been renamed to the Paul Hunter Classic in 2007.

== Tournament draw ==
The full match results are shown below. Players shown in bold denote match winners, whilst numbers to the left of players' names was the players seeding for the event.

Last 16; Best of 11 frames
1	**Ronnie O'Sullivan (ENG)**	**6**
12	Liang Wenbo (CHN)	5
8	**Neil Robertson (AUS)**	**6**
13	Ali Carter (ENG)	3
5	Judd Trump (ENG)	5
14	**Marco Fu (HKG)**	**6**
4	John Higgins (SCO)	5
10	**Mark Allen (NIR)**	**6**
3	Stuart Bingham (ENG)	1
9	**Joe Perry (ENG)**	**6**
6	**Ding Junhui (CHN)**	**6**
16	Kyren Wilson (ENG)	3
7	Shaun Murphy (ENG)	1
11	**Barry Hawkins (ENG)**	**6**
2	**Mark Selby (ENG)**	**6**
15	Mark Williams (WAL)	5

Quarter-finals; Best of 11 frames
1	(England) **Ronnie O'Sullivan**	**6**
8	(Australia) Neil Robertson	3
14	(Hong Kong) **Marco Fu**	**6**
10	(Northern Ireland) Mark Allen	2
9	(England) **Joe Perry**	**6**
6	(China) Ding Junhui	1
11	(England) **Barry Hawkins**	**6**
2	(England) Mark Selby	3

Semi-finals; Best of 11 frames
1	(England) **Ronnie O'Sullivan**	**6**
14	(Hong Kong) Marco Fu	4
9	(England) **Joe Perry**	**6**
11	(England) Barry Hawkins	5

Final; Best of 19 frames
1	(England) **Ronnie O'Sullivan**	**10**
9	(England) Joe Perry	7

=== Final ===
Final: Best of 19 frames. Referee: Paul Collier. Alexandra Palace, London, England, 22 January 2017
**Ronnie O'Sullivan** (1); England	**10**–7	Joe Perry (9); England
Afternoon: 24–**79** (72), 16–**101** (53), **86**–27 (58), 31–**90** (74), 0–**115** (115), **67**–40, **61**–21, **81**–23 (55); Evening: **51**–14, **124**–4 (68, 56), **67**–12, **108**–15 (85), 1–**117** (117), 1–**92** (92), **130**–0 (112), 1–**106** (53), **59**–39
112	Highest break	**117**
1	Century breaks	**2**
6	50+ breaks	**7**

== Century breaks ==
A total of 26 century breaks were made during the tournament, the highest of which being a 141 made by Marco Fu. The full list of century breaks are below:

- 141, 140, 130, 110, 110, 102 – Marco Fu
- 139, 109, 101 – Mark Selby
- 132 – Stuart Bingham
- 127, 117, 116, 115, 107 – Joe Perry
- 122, 121, 112 – Ronnie O'Sullivan
- 120 – Ding Junhui
- 117 – Neil Robertson
- 112, 102 – Judd Trump
- 111 – John Higgins
- 109 – Liang Wenbo
- 106 – Kyren Wilson
- 104 – Mark Allen
