= 1991 Masters (snooker) =

Professional non-ranking snooker tournament, Feb 1991

1991 Benson & Hedges Masters
Tournament information
- Dates: 3–10 February 1991
- Venue: Wembley Conference Centre
- City: London
- Country: England
- Organisation: WPBSA
- Format: Non-ranking event
- Total prize fund: £350,000
- Winner's share: £100,000
- Highest break: Dennis Taylor (NIR) (135)

Final
- Champion: Stephen Hendry (SCO)
- Runner-up: Mike Hallett (ENG)
- Score: 9–8

The 1991 Masters (officially the 1991 Benson & Hedges Masters) was a professional non-ranking snooker tournament that took place between 3 and 10 February 1991 at the Wembley Conference Centre in London, England. The highest break of the tournament was a 135 compiled by Dennis Taylor, for which he earned £7,500.

In the final, defending champion Stephen Hendry performed what is considered to be one of the greatest comebacks in snooker history, when he defeated Mike Hallett 9–8, after trailing 0–7 and 2–8 earlier in the match.

World number 1 Hendry went into the final as a firm 1/6 favourite, and with 9–3 Hendry being the most favoured score with the bookies, but world number 7 Hallett played one of the most dominant snooker sessions by an underdog to win all 7 frames of the afternoon session to take a 7–0 lead. In the first frame of the evening session, Hallett missed the final pink that would have made it 8–0, with Hendry then potting the pink and black to win his first frame of the match. Hendry reduced his arrears to 2–7, but then Hallett made it 8–2 and just one frame from victory. With the Masters title in his sights, Hallett just needed to pot the final pink and black in the eleventh frame to win the match, but he narrowly missed the pink with the rest, allowing Hendry to pot the pink to win the frame and reduce his arrears to 3–8. Despite Hallett having numerous chances in the following six frames, including in the last frame where Hallett led until the last few balls, Hendry eventually made a historic recovery to win 9–8.

Places in the tournament were allocated to the top 16 players in the world rankings. World number one Stephen Hendry was the number 1 seed. Players seeded 15 and 16 (Tony Meo and Alain Robidoux) competed in the wild-card round against Alan McManus, who was the winner of the qualifying event, and Gary Wilkinson (ranked 19), who was the wild-card selection. Martin Clark (ranked 12), Alan McManus, Alain Robidoux, and Gary Wilkinson were making their Masters debuts.

== Prize fund ==
The breakdown of prize money for this year is shown below:

- Winner: £100,000
- Runner-up: £50,000
- Semi-final: £23,000
- Quarter-final: £15,000
- Last 16: £9,000
- Last 18 (wild-cards): £6,000
- Highest break: £10,000
- Total: £350,000

== Wild-card round ==
Match	Date		Score	
WC1	Sunday 3 February	Tony Meo (ENG) (15)	5–3	Gary Wilkinson (ENG)
WC2	Monday 4 February	Alain Robidoux (CAN) (16)	3–5	Alan McManus (SCO)

== Main draw ==
Last 16; Best of 9 frames
1	Stephen Hendry (SCO)	5
14	John Virgo (ENG)	1
8	Dean Reynolds (ENG)	2
15	Tony Meo (ENG)	5
5	Doug Mountjoy (WAL)	4
9	Steve James (ENG)	5
4	Jimmy White (ENG)	5
12	Martin Clark (ENG)	1
3	John Parrott (ENG)	5
11	Willie Thorne (ENG)	3
6	Terry Griffiths (WAL)	5
10	Dennis Taylor (NIR)	2
7	Mike Hallett (ENG)	5
Alan McManus (SCO)	3
2	Steve Davis (ENG)	4
13	Neal Foulds (ENG)	5

Quarter-finals; Best of 9 frames
1	(Scotland) Stephen Hendry	5
15	(England) Tony Meo	0
9	(England) Steve James	4
4	(England) Jimmy White	5
3	(England) John Parrott	2
6	(Wales) Terry Griffiths	5
7	(England) Mike Hallett	5
13	(England) Neal Foulds	1

Semi-finals; Best of 11 frames
1	(Scotland) Stephen Hendry	6
4	(England) Jimmy White	1
6	(Wales) Terry Griffiths	3
7	(England) Mike Hallett	6

Final; Best of 17 frames
1	(Scotland) Stephen Hendry	9
7	(England) Mike Hallett	8

== Final ==
Final: Best of 17 frames. Referee: John Street; Wembley Conference Centre, London, England, 10 February 1991.
Stephen Hendry; Scotland	9–8	Mike Hallett; England
Afternoon session: 59–84 (Hendry 59, Hallett 80), 4–58, 12–93 (53), 29–81, 41–87 (87), 7–88 (73), 0–77; Evening session: 73–67 (60), 73–35, 58–70 (Hendry 53), 67–49, 61–50, 67–43, 72–15, 63–14, 64–57, 51–41
60	Highest break	87
0	Century breaks	0
3	50+ breaks	4

== Qualifying Event ==
Alan McManus won the qualifying tournament, known as the 1990 Benson & Hedges Satellite Championship at the time beating James Wattana 9–5 in the final to qualify for the main tournament at Wembley. The tournament was played at the Masters Club in Glasgow between 1 and 6 December 1990.

== Century breaks ==
Total: 9

- 135 – Dennis Taylor
- 131, 117, 114 – Stephen Hendry
- 125 – Mike Hallett
- 107 – Doug Mountjoy
- 108, 101 – Jimmy White
- 101 – Steve James
