= Masters Qualifying Event =

Snooker tournament

Tournament information
- Venue: World Snooker Centre
- Location: Prestatyn
- Country: Wales
- Established: 1990
- Organisation(s): World Professional Billiards and Snooker Association
- Format: Non-ranking event
- Final year: 2009
- Final champion: (England) Rory McLeod

The Masters Qualifying Event was a professional snooker tournament, which ran from 1990 to 2009. Each season, the winner of the event was awarded a wild-card to play at the Masters.

== History ==
At the 1990 Masters two wild-cards were added to the tournament and the following season a qualifying tournament was established for one of these wild-cards. The tournament was named Benson & Hedges Championship. The event was held in Glasgow and Alan McManus became the inaugural champion.

In the 1992/1993 season it became one of the minor-ranking events along with the three Strachan Challenge events. These events carried one-tenth of the ranking points of other tournaments. However, most of the top players did not enter, so it lost ranking status from the next season. The event was then moved to Edinburgh in 1994/1995 for three years, to Malvern in 1997/1998 for four years and to Mansfield in 2001/2002 for two years.

In 2003/2004 the event was renamed to Masters Qualifying Event due to restrictions on tobacco advertising in the United Kingdom. The event was held in Prestatyn; the top 16 players were excluded from the event and other non-participating Main Tour members were replaced by top players from the Challenge Tour Order of Merit. After a season away, the Masters Qualifying Event returned to the calendar in 2005/2006, and was moved to the English Institute of Sport in Sheffield next season for three years. The event was last held in Prestatyn during the 2009/10 season.

There has been five official maximum breaks during the history of the tournament. Karl Burrows made the first against Adrian Rosa in 1999. The second was made in 2000 by David McLellan against Steve Meakin, the third in 2001 by Shaun Murphy against Adrian Rosa and the fourth in 2002 by Tony Drago against Stuart Bingham. The last came at the 2005 event by Bingham against Marcus Campbell. There was one further maximum break by Terry Murphy against Robert Thallon but it was not officially ratified due to the match being played on one of the outside non-templated tables.

== Winners ==
Year	Winner	Runner-up	Final score	Season
Benson & Hedges Championship (Non-ranking)
1990	(Scotland) Alan McManus	(Thailand) James Wattana	9–5	1990/91
1991	(Republic of Ireland) Ken Doherty	(Wales) Darren Morgan	9–3	1991/92
Benson & Hedges Championship (Minor-ranking)
1992	(Scotland) Chris Small	(Scotland) Alan McManus	9–1	1992/93
Benson & Hedges Championship (Non-ranking)
1993	(England) Ronnie O'Sullivan	(Scotland) John Lardner	9–6	1993/94
1994	(Wales) Mark Williams	(England) Rod Lawler	9–5	1994/95
1995	(Wales) Matthew Stevens	(Scotland) Paul McPhillips	9–3	1995/96
1996	(England) Brian Morgan	(Scotland) Drew Henry	9–8	1996/97
1997	(England) Andy Hicks	(Wales) Paul Davies	9–6	1997/98
1998	(England) David Gray	(England) Dave Harold	9–6	1998/99
1999	(England) Ali Carter	(England) Simon Bedford	9–4	1999/00
2000	(England) Shaun Murphy	(England) Stuart Bingham	9–7	2000/01
2001	(Wales) Ryan Day	(Scotland) Hugh Abernethy	9–5	2001/02
2002	(England) Mark Davis	(Cyprus) Mehmet Husnu	9–6	2002/03
Masters Qualifying Event (Non-ranking)
2003	(Australia) Neil Robertson	(Wales) Dominic Dale	6–5	2003/04
2005	(England) Stuart Bingham	(England) Ali Carter	6–3	2005/06
2006	(England) Stuart Bingham	(England) Mark Selby	6–2	2006/07
2007	(England) Barry Hawkins	(Norway) Kurt Maflin	6–4	2007/08
2008	(England) Judd Trump	(England) Mark Joyce	6–1	2008/09
2009	(England) Rory McLeod	(England) Andrew Higginson	6–1	2009/10
