= 2016 Masters (snooker) =

Professional non-ranking snooker tournament, Jan 2016

2016 Dafabet Masters
Tournament information
- Dates: 10–17 January 2016
- Venue: Alexandra Palace
- City: London
- Country: England
- Organisation: World Snooker
- Format: Non-ranking event
- Total prize fund: £600,000
- Winner's share: £200,000
- Highest break: Judd Trump (ENG) (140)

Final
- Champion: Ronnie O'Sullivan (ENG)
- Runner-up: Barry Hawkins (ENG)
- Score: 10–1

The 2016 Masters (officially the 2016 Dafabet Masters) was a professional non-ranking snooker tournament that took place between 10 and 17 January 2016 at the Alexandra Palace in London, England. It was the 42nd staging of the Masters tournament and the fifth successive time it was held at the Alexandra Palace.

The defending champion Shaun Murphy lost 4–6 against Mark Allen in the first round. Murphy forfeited the sixth frame of the match by missing a red on three consecutive occasions.

The quarter-final between Judd Trump and Neil Robertson produced six century breaks, setting a new record for the most centuries in an 11-frame match. These included the two highest breaks of the tournament, 140 from Trump and 139 from Robertson. The match was singled out for particular praise, with John Virgo calling it one of the greatest in Masters history.

Playing in his first major televised tournament since taking an eight-month hiatus from professional snooker, Ronnie O'Sullivan reached a record-extending 11th Masters final and won the tournament for a sixth time, equalling Stephen Hendry's record for the most Masters titles. Losing only the first frame, he defeated Barry Hawkins 10–1, the biggest winning margin since Steve Davis whitewashed Mike Hallett 9–0 in 1988, and the first time a player had won ten consecutive frames in a Masters final.

== Overview ==
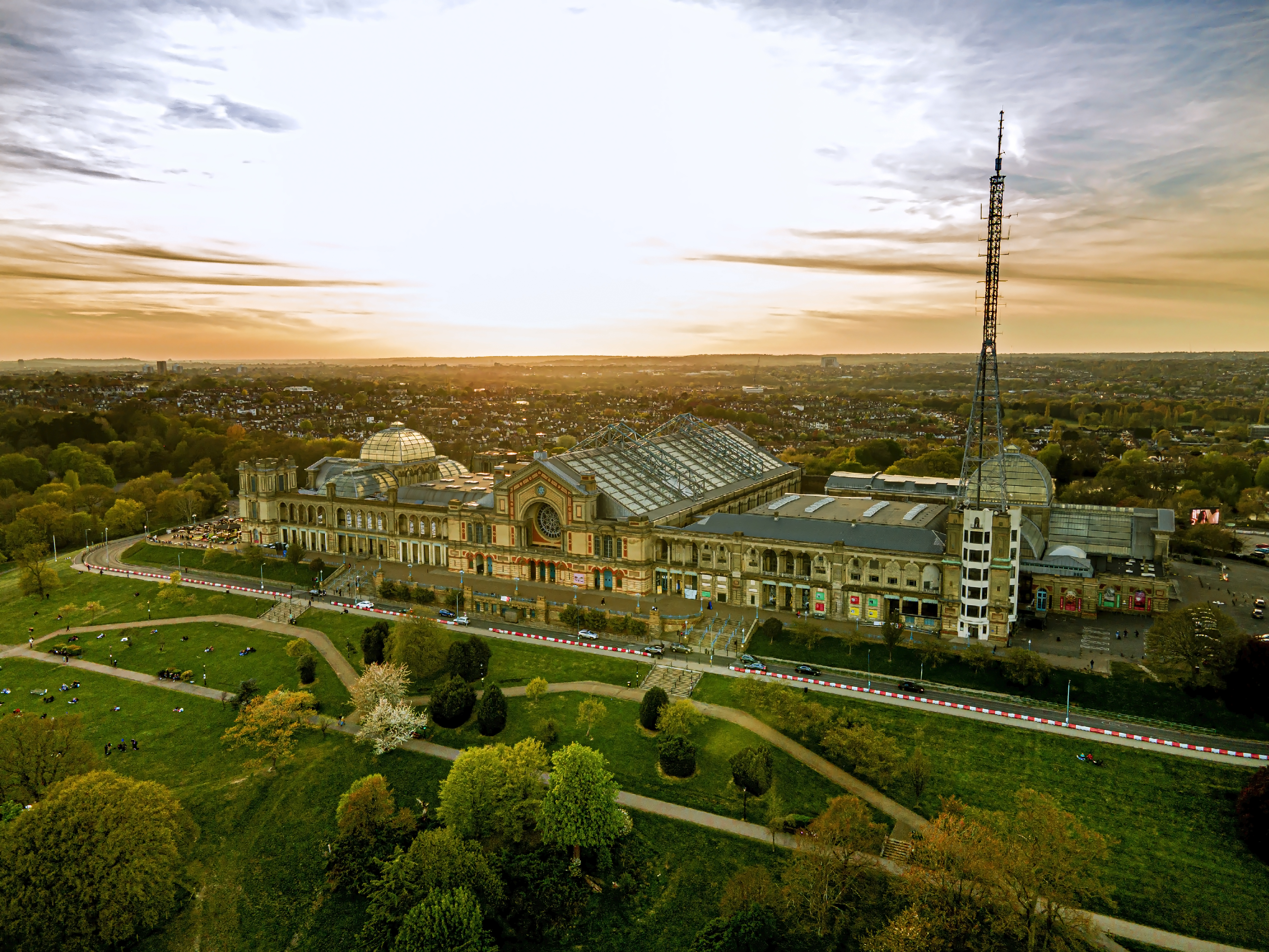
The event was held at the Alexandra Palace in London, England (pictured).

The Masters is an invitational snooker tournament first held in 1975. Organised by World Snooker, the 2016 Masters was the 42nd staging of the tournament. It was the second Triple Crown event of the 2015–16 snooker season, following the 2015 UK Championship and preceding the 2016 World Snooker Championship. Held between 10 and 17 January 2016, the event was played at the Alexandra Palace in London. Matches were played as the best-of-11 frames until the final, which was the best-of-19 frames played over two sessions. The event was sponsored for the third time by online betting site Dafabet.

=== Participants ===
The event featured the 16 players who were placed highest in the world rankings after the UK Championship in December 2015. The defending champion was Shaun Murphy, who won the 2015 Masters with a 10–2 victory over Neil Robertson in the final. Murphy was seeded first for the event as defending champion. Stuart Bingham, as world champion, was seeded second. The next six players in the world rankings were seeded and allocated fixed positions in the draw, with the remaining eight participants drawn randomly against the. Liang Wenbo, who entered the top 16 for the first time after reaching the final of the UK Champion, made his Masters debut, the only player to do so at the 2015 event.

=== Prize fund ===
The total prize money of the event was unchanged at £600,000. The breakdown of prize money is shown below:

- Winner: £200,000
- Runner-up: £90,000
- Semi-finals: £50,000
- Quarter-finals: £25,000
- Last 16: £12,500
- Highest break: £10,000
- Total: £600,000

== Tournament summary ==
=== First round ===
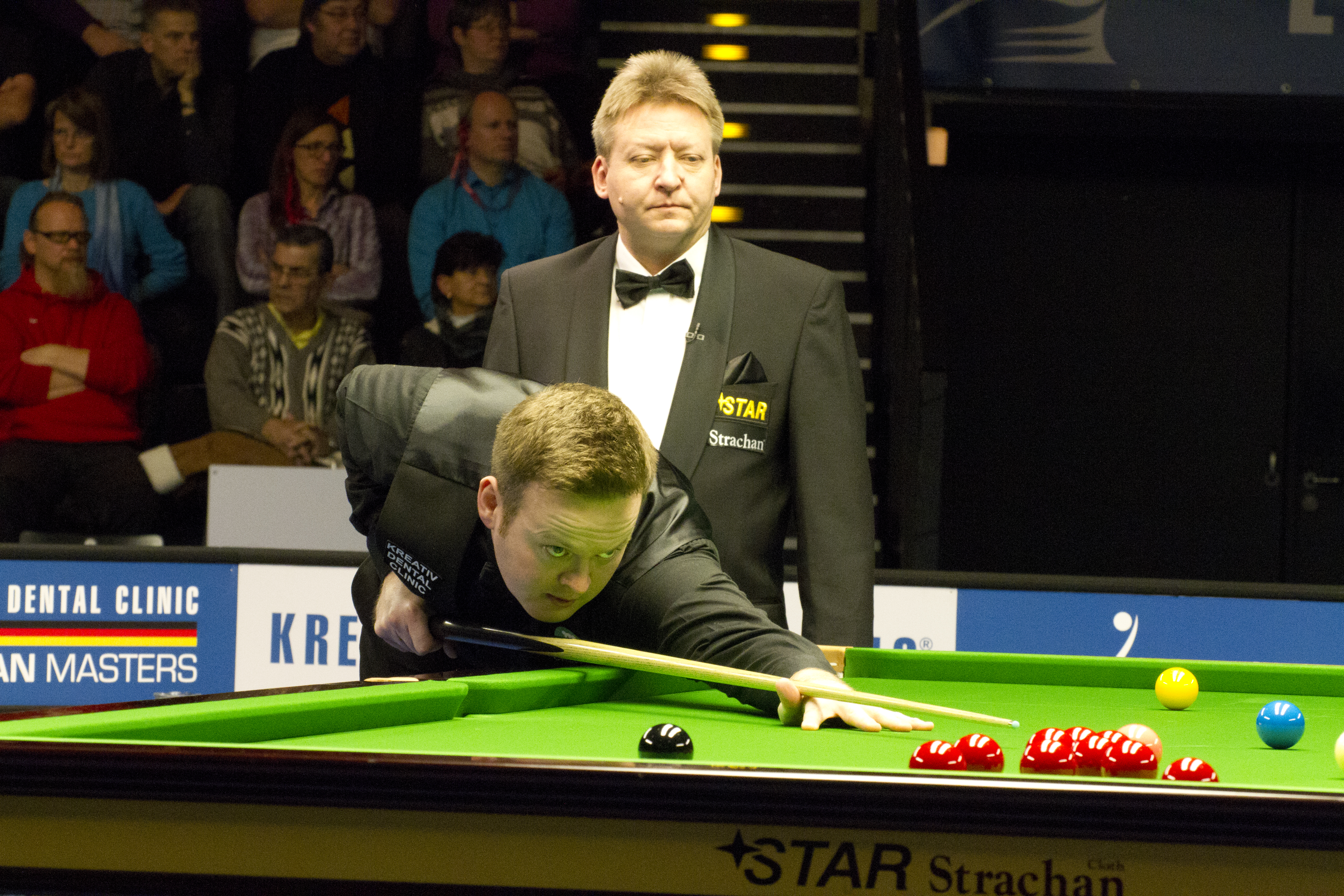
Shaun Murphy (pictured in 2015), the defending champion, forfeited a frame under the three-miss rule in his first-round match against Mark Allen and went on to lose 4–6.

The first round was played between 10 and 13 January 2014 as the best-of-11 frames. In the opening match, the defending champion, Shaun Murphy, faced Mark Allen, semifinalist in 2011. The first two frames were shared, with breaks of 50 for Allen and 68 for Murphy, and Allen then compiled a century break of 137. Murphy tied the match once again with a 65 break, but Allen made another half-century, this time of 91, to move one ahead. Murphy forfeited the sixth frame under the three-miss rule, but he said he did not have other options rather than to risk it: "I had to man up, take a deep breath and play the right shot. Unfortunately I got it completely wrong". Allen then compiled a century of 104 in the next one to put himself one away from victory. Although Murphy won two frames on the trot thanks to a break of 67 and a century of 100, Allen clinched victory in the tenth frame, the only one other than the one ended after the three misses that did not feature a half-century. The 2011 champion, Ding Junhui, and Stuart Bingham, who had won the 2015 World Snooker Championship at the end of the previous season, also shared the first two frames of their first-round encounter. In the third frame, Bingham was on a maximum break attempt, but, having potted fifteen red balls and fifteen blacks, he missed the yellow while beginning to clear up the colours, and the break ended at 120. Bingham then sealed the first victory of his career in the Masters with a 6–4 result after close to four hours of play.

The following day, Stephen Maguire, four-time semi-finalist, faced Judd Trump, who had lost his first-round match in the Masters for two consecutive years. Maguire took the second frame to level the match at 1–1, but then went on to lose four on the trot. He then compiled breaks of 92, 74 and 56, and restored balance at 4–4. However, Trump won the ninth and tenth breaks to seal victory. "My lack of form has put pressure on because I was used to going out there and expecting to play well", said Trump, who wanted to "give snooker four or five years of complete dedication and see what happens". In the evening, Barry Hawkins and Joe Perry shared the first six frames, but Hawkins, aided by half-centuries of 81 and 58, won three on the trot to advance into the quarter-finals.

=== Quarter-finals ===
The quarter-final between Judd Trump and Neil Robertson produced six century breaks, setting a new record for the most centuries in an 11-frame match. These included the two highest breaks of the tournament, 140 from Trump and 139 from Robertson. The match was singled out for particular praise, with John Virgo calling it one of the greatest in Masters history.

=== Final ===
Playing in his first major televised tournament since taking an eight-month hiatus from professional snooker, Ronnie O'Sullivan reached a record-extending 11th Masters final and won the tournament for a sixth time, equalling Stephen Hendry's record for the most Masters titles. Losing only the first frame, he defeated Barry Hawkins 10–1, the biggest winning margin since Steve Davis whitewashed Mike Hallett 9–0 in 1988, and the first time a player had won ten consecutive frames in a Masters final.

== Tournament draw ==
Last 16; Best of 11 frames
1 | Shaun Murphy (ENG) | 4
11 | Mark Allen (NIR) | 6
8 | Barry Hawkins (ENG) | 6
10 | Joe Perry (ENG) | 3
5 | Judd Trump (ENG) | 6
16 | Stephen Maguire (SCO) | 4
4 | Neil Robertson (AUS) | 6
14 | Marco Fu (HKG) | 0
3 | Mark Selby (ENG) | 6
12 | Ricky Walden (ENG) | 0
6 | Ronnie O'Sullivan (ENG) | 6
13 | Mark Williams (WAL) | 5
7 | John Higgins (SCO) | 6
15 | Liang Wenbo (CHN) | 4
2 | Stuart Bingham (ENG) | 6
9 | Ding Junhui (CHN) | 4

Quarter-finals; Best of 11 frames
11 | (Northern Ireland) Mark Allen | 2
8 | (England) Barry Hawkins | 6
5 | (England) Judd Trump | 6
4 | (Australia) Neil Robertson | 5
3 | (England) Mark Selby | 3
6 | (England) Ronnie O'Sullivan | 6
7 | (Scotland) John Higgins | 3
2 | (England) Stuart Bingham | 6

Semi-finals; Best of 11 frames
8 | (England) Barry Hawkins | 6
5 | (England) Judd Trump | 4
6 | (England) Ronnie O'Sullivan | 6
2 | (England) Stuart Bingham | 3

Final; Best of 19 frames
8 | (England) Barry Hawkins | 1
6 | (England) Ronnie O'Sullivan | 10

== Final ==
Final: Best of 19 frames. Referee: Olivier Marteel. Alexandra Palace, London, England, 17 January 2016.
| Barry Hawkins (8); England | 1–10 | Ronnie O'Sullivan (6); England |
Afternoon: 66–50, 8–97 (70), 0–136 (136), 49–73 (52), 28–72, 36–64, 17–77 (77), 13–72 (72); Evening: 39–58, 0–92 (66), 0–82 (82)
| 48 | Highest break | 136 |
| 0 | Century breaks | 1 |
| 0 | 50+ breaks | 7 |

== Century breaks ==
Total: 26

- 140, 129, 105, 104, 103 – Judd Trump
- 139, 106, 100 – Neil Robertson
- 137, 109, 104 – Mark Allen
- 136, 121, 117, 104, 100 – Ronnie O'Sullivan
- 133, 120, 119, 104 – John Higgins
- 130, 128, 100 – Barry Hawkins
- 120 – Stuart Bingham
- 113 – Mark Selby
- 100 – Shaun Murphy
