= 1984 Masters (snooker) =

Professional non-ranking snooker tournament, Jan 1984

1984 Benson & Hedges Masters
Tournament information
- Dates: 22–29 January 1984
- Venue: Wembley Conference Centre
- City: London
- Country: England
- Organisation: WPBSA
- Format: Non-ranking event
- Total prize fund: £115,000
- Winner's share: £35,000
- Highest break: Kirk Stevens (CAN) (147)

Final
- Champion: Jimmy White (ENG)
- Runner-up: Terry Griffiths (WAL)
- Score: 9–5

The 1984 Masters (officially the 1984 Benson & Hedges Masters) was a professional non-ranking snooker tournament that took place between 22 and 29 January 1984 at the Wembley Conference Centre. The Masters, in its 10th year, changed the format into a championship for the game's top 16 ranked players. The BBC extended their television coverage to show all 8 days of the event and the prize money was more than double that of the previous year.

Defending champion Cliff Thorburn lost to John Spencer in the first round, but it was fellow Canadian Kirk Stevens' maximum break against Jimmy White in the 9th frame of their semi-final, for which the tournament is perhaps best remembered. The break earned Stevens £10,000 for the 147, £1,000 for the highest break, and a gold award for breaking the tournament record. It was Stevens' second maximum break, the other being made in a practice session, and only the 3rd ever televised 147 break by any player. "I couldn't believe how I felt. I was just enthralled in it, lost in it" Stevens said. Meanwhile, White won the match 6–4 with a 119 break in the next frame and went on to win his only Masters title. In front of his home crowd, he beat Welshman Terry Griffiths by 9 frames to 5, playing in his fourth Masters final in five years.

== Field ==
Defending champion Cliff Thorburn was the number 1 seed with World Champion Steve Davis seeded 2. The remaining places were allocated to the top 16 players in the world rankings. Tony Knowles was making his debut in the Masters.

== Main draw ==
Last 16; Best of 9 frames
1	Cliff Thorburn (CAN)	4
16	John Spencer (ENG)	5
8	Bill Werbeniuk (CAN)	1
9	Terry Griffiths (WAL)	5
5	Alex Higgins (NIR)	5
12	Doug Mountjoy (WAL)	2
4	Tony Knowles (ENG)	5
13	Dennis Taylor (NIR)	2
3	Ray Reardon (WAL)	5
14	John Virgo (ENG)	3
6	Eddie Charlton (AUS)	2
11	Jimmy White (ENG)	5
7	Kirk Stevens (CAN)	5
10	David Taylor (ENG)	1
2	Steve Davis (ENG)	5
15	Tony Meo (ENG)	0

Quarter-finals; Best of 9 frames
16	(England) John Spencer	4
9	(Wales) Terry Griffiths	5
5	(Northern Ireland) Alex Higgins	1
4	(England) Tony Knowles	5
3	(Wales) Ray Reardon	3
11	(England) Jimmy White	5
7	(Canada) Kirk Stevens	5
2	(England) Steve Davis	3

Semi-finals; Best of 11 frames
9	(Wales) Terry Griffiths	6
4	(England) Tony Knowles	4
11	(England) Jimmy White	6
7	(Canada) Kirk Stevens	4

Final; Best of 17 frames
9	(Wales) Terry Griffiths	5
11	(England) Jimmy White	9

== Final ==
Final: Best of 17 frames. Referee: John Street; Wembley Conference Centre, London, England, 29 January 1984.
Jimmy White; England	9–5	Terry Griffiths; Wales
First session: 106–1, 85–16 (79), 59–51, 68–52, 77–16 (76), 60–66 (White 53), 24–96 (59), 8–71, 96–11, 65–13, 69–55, 7–71, 20–74, 67–41
79	Highest break	59
0	Century breaks	0
3	50+ breaks	1

== Century breaks ==
Total: 6

- 147, 105 – Kirk Stevens
- 119, 113 – Jimmy White
- 112 – Ray Reardon
- 100 – Doug Mountjoy
