= 2005 Masters (snooker) =

Professional non-ranking snooker tournament, Feb 2005

2005 Rileys Club Masters

Tournament information
- Dates: 13–20 February 2005
- Venue: Wembley Conference Centre
- City: London
- Country: England
- Organisation: World Professional Billiards and Snooker Association
- Format: Non-ranking event
- Total prize fund: £400,000
- Winner's share: £125,000
- Highest break: Ding Junhui (CHN) (141)

Final
- Champion: Ronnie O'Sullivan (ENG)
- Runner-up: John Higgins (SCO)
- Score: 10–3

The 2005 Masters (officially the 2005 Rileys Club Masters) was the 2005 edition of the non-ranking Masters professional snooker tournament. It was held from 13 to 20 February 2005 at the Wembley Conference Centre, London. The tournament was the 31st staging of the competition and was the sixth of nine World Professional Billiards and Snooker Association (WPBSA) main tour events in the 2004/2005 season. The tournament was broadcast in the United Kingdom on the BBC and by Eurosport in Europe.

Ronnie O'Sullivan, the 2004 world champion, won the tournament, defeating 1999 Masters winner John Higgins ten frames to three in the final to claim his first Masters tournament victory since 1995. It was O'Sullivan's second Masters title in his fifth appearance in the final. O'Sullivan became the sixth player in Masters history to win the tournament more than once. In the semi-finals Higgins beat Peter Ebdon 6–3 and O'Sullivan defeated Jimmy White 6–1. Ding Junhui made the tournament's highest break of 141 in his first round match against Ken Doherty. The Masters preceded the Irish Masters and followed the Malta Cup.

== Tournament summary ==
The Masters was first held in 1975 and is part of the Triple Crown events of the game of snooker alongside the World Snooker Championship and the UK Championship; it does not have official ranking status. The 2005 tournament, held between 13 and 20 February at the Wembley Conference Centre in London, was the sixth of nine World Professional Billiards and Snooker Association (WPBSA) main tour events of the 2004/2005 season, following the Malta Cup and preceding the Irish Masters. The defending Masters champion was Paul Hunter, who defeated Ronnie O'Sullivan 10–9 in the 2004 final.

Sponsored by the national sports member company Rileys Club for the first time, it had a total prize fund of £400,000, and the host broadcasters were the BBC and Eurosport. All matches were the best-of-11 frames until the final, which was played to the best-of-19 frames. While Hunter had a poor form since making the semi-finals of the Grand Prix tournament, he said he was unworried, "I have been preparing for events in the same way and I'm not going to change my game. It's just one of those things at the moment and once I get a run of wins under my belt I'll be fine."

=== Format and wild-card round ===
Defending champion Hunter was the first seed with world champion O'Sullivan seeded second. Places were allocated to the top 16 players in the world rankings. Players seeded 15 and 16 played in the wild-card round against the two wild-card selections, Stephen Maguire (ranked 24) and Ding Junhui (ranked 76). Maguire had won the UK Championship the previous November and was making his Masters debut. Ding played seed 16 Marco Fu and won 6–4. Trailing 4–2 after Fu took the opening four frames with breaks of 100 and 57, Ding responded to win the next four frames with breaks of 50 and 77 in the seventh and eighth frames to win. Graeme Dott was 2–1 behind fellow Scot Maguire when he clinched five of the next seven frames with breaks of 98, 92, 83, 62 and 54 to win 6–4. It was Dott's first victory at the Wembley Conference Centre in his fourth Masters appearance.

=== Round 1 ===
In his first round match world number 13 and three-time Masters champion Steve Davis overhauled Hunter 6–5. Breaks of 70 and 82 put Davis into a 2–0 lead. The match went to a final frame decider that Davis led with a score of 58–0. He missed a routine red ball shot, and Hunter countered with a 46 break, only for him to miss a shot. A brief safety shot exchange ensued before Davis undercut the final red ball 12 ft (140 in) down the side cushion and into the top right-hand corner pocket. Davis then potted the coloured balls to win. Peter Ebdon took 1 hour and 45 minutes to whitewash his opponent David Gray 6–0 with breaks of 106, 96, 110, 69 and 96; Gray did not pot a single ball in the final three frames. After the match, Ebdon attributed the result to losing weight through physical activity. The 2004 Players' Championship winner Jimmy White edged out Matthew Stevens 6–5. Trailing 5–3 White needed two snookers and a clearance to get back into contention. He achieved this when Stevens narrowly missed a long-range red ball shot. White then compiled a break of 115 to force a final frame decider in which he outscored Stevens 88–0 to progress into the quarter-finals.

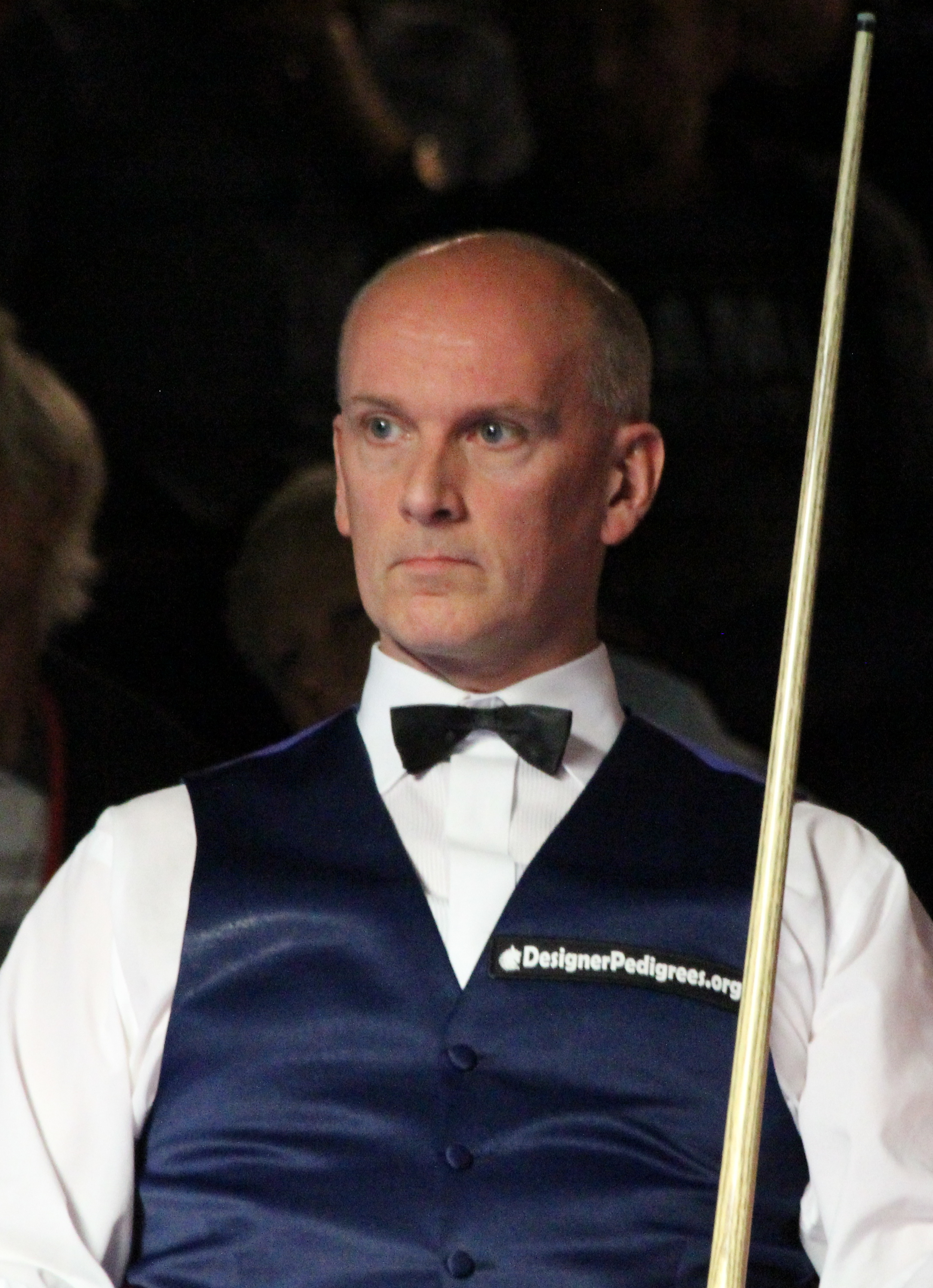
Peter Ebdon (pictured in 2018) achieved the only whitewash of the tournament against David Gray.

O'Sullivan began his match against Dott with a break of 64 and then made his 21st century break of the 2004/2005 season with a 130 in the second. Dott tied the match at 3–3 with a 41 clearance. O'Sullivan then clinched the next three frames with breaks of 72 and 85 with a 51 clearance to win 6–3. John Higgins, the 1999 Masters champion. faced fellow Scot Chris Small. Higgins won the opening four frames with 106, 60, 47 and 48 runs. Small prevented a whitewash by taking frame five. Higgins lost the chance of a maximum break in frame six when he missed the sixth black ball shot while on 65 points. He then won frame seven and the game 6–1. At age 17 Ding became the youngest quarter-finals player in Masters history when he defeated Ken Doherty, the 1997 world champion, 6–1; Doherty contracted an ear infection three days earlier . Doherty won frame two as Ding took the first, third and fourth frames with the tournament's highest break (a 141 clearance) and further runs of 81 and 52. Doherty lost frame five after missing the black ball and then the sixth with a missed shot on the pink. He then forced a re-spotted black ball finish in frame seven that Ding won.

Two time Masters and world champion Mark Williams played the 1994 tournament winner and world number 10 Alan McManus. McManus made breaks of 63 and 54 to lead 2–1. Williams compiled breaks of 67, 54, 116 and a 66 clearance to defeat McManus 6–3 after the latter missed a straightforward red ball shot in the eighth frame. In the final first-round game Stephen Hendry played world number 12 Stephen Lee. Hendry led the match throughout from breaks of 61, 78, 110 and 82. He amassed an unchallenged 325 points to win 6–1 and claim his 40th match victory at the Masters. Hendry missed the chance to achieve a seventh career maximum break when attempting a 13th black ball shot in frame five; he was out of position from a four-cushion positional shot and was required to pot the blue ball. Lee stated afterwards that he was considered ending his snooker career had he not improved his confidence and playing ability.

=== Quarter-finals ===
In the opening quarter-final match, Ebdon defeated Davis 6–1. After some advanced tactical play on the table Ebdon opened out an early lead of 3–0 with breaks of 60, 62 and 78. Although Davis took a solitary frame, Ebdon continued to break-build with runs of 88, 68 and 66 to win the match. The victory enabled Ebdon to reach the semi-finals of the Masters for the first time in his career since the 1995 tournament. The second quarter-final match had Higgins play fellow Scot Hendry. Higgins built a 5–1 lead from breaks of 101, 62 and 59; Hendry lacked composure during this period. Hendry did compile a 108 century break in frame seven before Higgins won frame eight to claim a 6–2 victory. Hendry bemoaned his loss of form, "I don't know where that came from. You are going to have days when you don't play well. You would be a robot if you didn't but my head wasn't right and I played dreadfully." Higgins shared his opponent's view, "I'm just happy in my own mind to be playing better because if you are not happy within yourself you won't win, no matter who you are playing."

White overcame Williams to win 6–5. White had a 3–0 advantage, producing a break of 73, a 51 clearance and a 30 break in the third frame. Williams spoke to referee Paul Collier to suggest that the table's top cushion had too much bounce and White concurred. Both players agreed to have an early mid-session interval as table fitters took 25 minutes to correct the table's mechanics. Williams clinched the next three frames with a trio of half-centuries to tie the match at 3–3. White and Williams shared the following four frames to force a final frame decider that White won. The WPBSA issued a statement that examination of the table confirmed that there was no change in playing conditions and stated it would investigate whether static in the arena affected it. O'Sullivan took 104 minutes to defeat Ding 6–2 and outscored him 444–43 in the final five frames. Trailing 2–1 O'Sullivan won the following five frames with breaks of 77, 92, 123 and 67, saying afterwards, "With two players capable of scoring heavily there is always a danger of one of them running away with the game."

=== Semi-finals ===
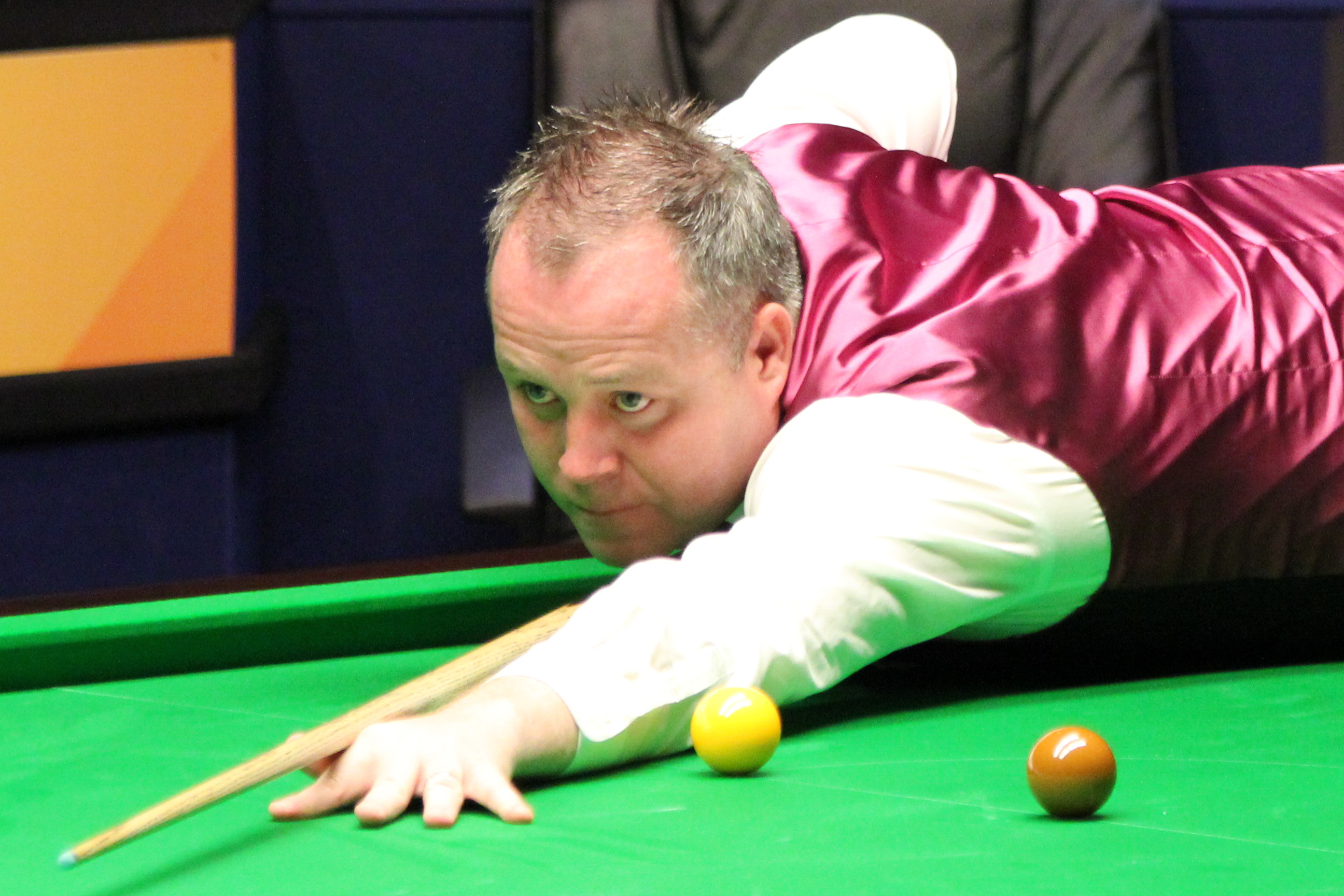
John Higgins (pictured in 2012) won his semi-final match 6–3 over Ebdon.

The semi-finals were held on 19 February. The first semi-final was between Ebdon and Higgins. The match began with Higgins compiling breaks of 67 and 69 to lead 2–0. It appeared he would increase his lead by one frame in the third, before he missed a black ball and Ebdon produced a clearance to win the frame. Higgins took frame four and Ebdon achieved a 96 break to win the fifth. Ebdon lost a 40-minute sixth frame to Higgins, who then secured frame seven after fluking a red ball midway through. A run of 79 from Ebdon pressured Higgins; the latter clinched frame nine to win the match 6–3. After the game Higgins admitted he thought of his 6–5 loss to Dott in the semi-finals of the Malta Cup in January because he missed some important shots that provided Ebdon with opportunities, "What happened in Malta came back into my mind and put me under pressure. You rarely see great semi-finals because there's so much riding on the match. I needed a few chances but I'm delighted to get through to the final and pleased to be back playing to a decent standard."

In the other semi-final, White, who competed in a record-breaking 11th Masters semi-final, was defeated by O'Sullivan 6–1. O'Sullivan produced two consecutive breaks of 76 and 97 in the first three frames to lead 3–0 as White did not strike a single ball for 35 minutes. In frame four, White prevented O'Sullivan from whitewashing him with a run of 75. O'Sullivan subsequently made breaks of 49, 36, 106, 41 and 36 in the next three frames to eliminate White from the tournament in 97 minutes. O'Sullivan said after the match a free-flowing game was to be expected with White, "It was a bit like a derby match in football where there was one player doing well coming into the match and one not doing so well but where anything could happen amongst the excitement with all the adrenaline flowing." White admitted he had been unable to challenge his opponent, "I had a couple of chances and didn't do anything with them. You can't do that against Ronnie. But it's been a great week and I've really enjoyed myself."

=== Final ===
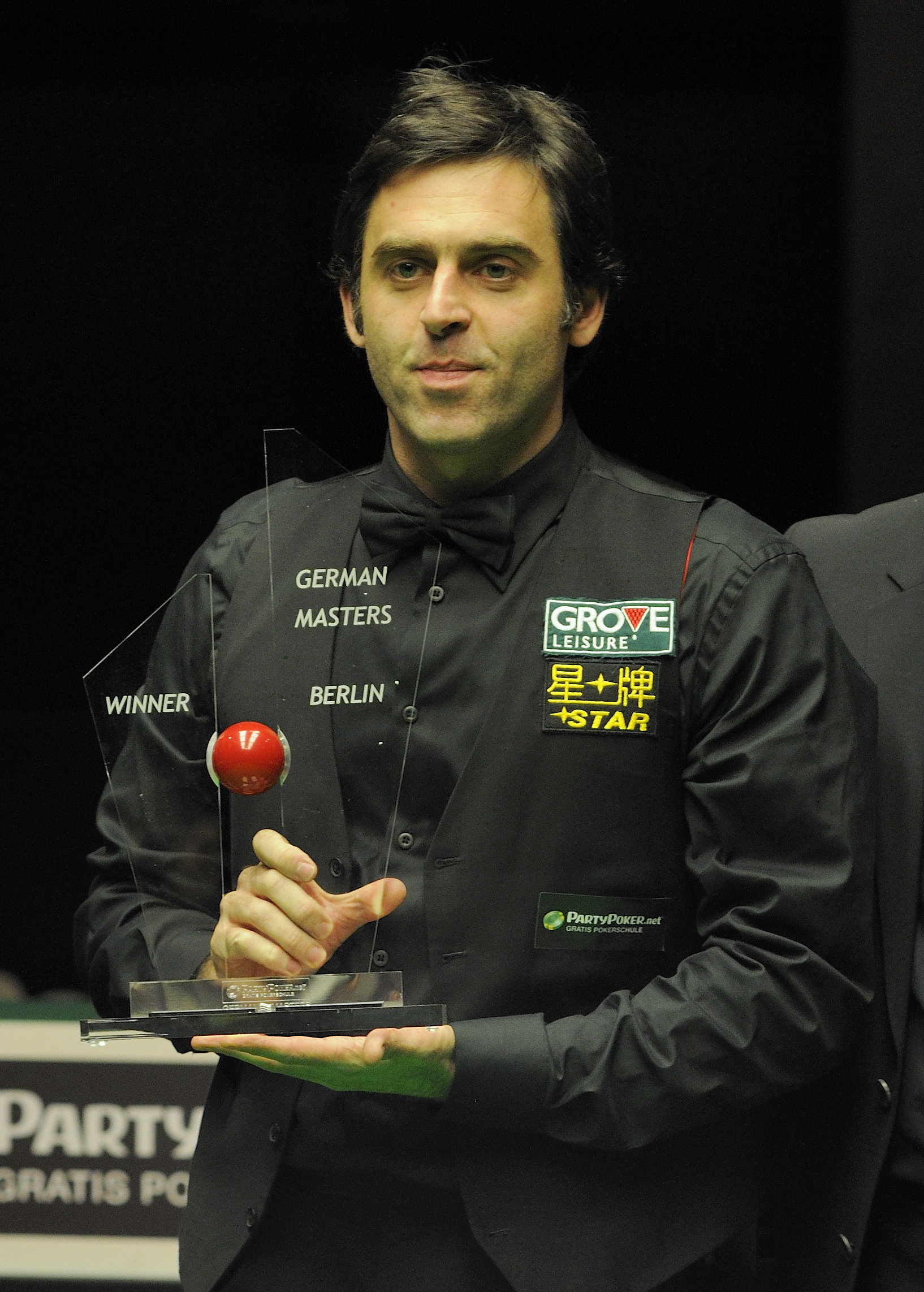
Ronnie O'Sullivan (pictured in 2012) won his first Masters tournament since 1995.

The match was O'Sullivan's fifth and Higgins' third appearance in a final at the Masters. In the best-of-19 frame final, held before 2,500 people, O'Sullivan defeated Higgins 10–3 to win second Masters title and his first since the 1995 tournament. He joined Cliff Thorburn, Alex Higgins, Hendry, Davis and Hunter as the sixth player to win the Masters more than once. It was his third title of the 2004/2005 season after winning Grand Prix in October and the Welsh Open in January. The victory earned O'Sullivan £125,000 and brought his season's cumulative total to £240,750. The media stated the match was the most dominant performance in a Masters final since the 1988 tournament match in which Davis whitewashed Mike Hallett 9–0. John Dee of The Daily Telegraph wrote of the match, "Never before has snooker reached the high standard which O'Sullivan displayed on the Wembley stage", and the reporter for the Irish Examiner called O'Sullivan's win "breathtaking".

In the afternoon session, O'Sullivan took the first frame with a break of 95, after jousting with Higgins in a safety shot battle for a quarter of an hour. Higgins followed with breaks of 54 and 76 in the second and third frames to go 2–1 ahead. Entering the mid-session interval, O'Sullivan equalled the score at 2–2 with a 107 break. He took the lead with a half-century run in the fifth frame. Higgins potted two balls as O'Sullivan produced runs of 58 and 97 in frames six and seven. Trailing 32–0 in the eighth frame, O'Sullivan missed a pink ball shot to a centre pocket, allowing Higgins to produce a 53 run, and leave O'Sullivan requiring two snookers after a four-point foul. Although O'Sullivan obtained the necessary points, Higgins won the frame on the blue ball to leave it 5–3 at the conclusion of the first session. In the evening session, O'Sullivan took 62 minutes to produce breaks of 79, 75 and 134 to win the match and the tournament. O'Sullivan had a 97 per cent of potting rate success to Higgins' 89 per cent at the end of the final and brought his total season century breaks to 25. 1991 world champion and BBC analyst John Parrott likened the statistic to O'Sullivan's 17–4 victory over Hendry in the semi-finals of the 2004 World Snooker Championship, "It is a pleasure to watch. He played every shot in the book and each time the cue ball landed on a sixpence."

After his victory O'Sullivan said he was playing better than before, "I played good frames from start to finish. And to do it against a player of John's calibre makes it more satisfying. There's no better place than Wembley or Sheffield to produce your best and so this win is very satisfying." Higgins labelled O'Sullivan "a total genius" due to his high level of playing standard, "Somehow the rest of us have got to try and catch up. It was great to watch even though I was on the receiving end. I know some other top players can produce stuff like that but Ronnie was inch perfect every time."

== Prize fund ==
The breakdown of prize money for this year is shown below:

- Winner: £125,000
- Runner-Up: £60,000
- Semi-final: £30,500
- Quarter Finalist: £15,000
- Last 16: £10,000
- Last 18 (wild-cards): £2,000
- Highest break: £10,000
- Maximum break: £25,000
- Total: £400,000

== Wild-card round ==
The wild-card round was played with two seeded players and two wild card entrants. Players denoted in bold are the winners of their matches.

Match		Score	
WC1	Marco Fu (HKG) (15)	4–**6**	**Ding Junhui** (CHN)
WC2	**Graeme Dott** (SCO) (16)	**6**–4	Stephen Maguire (SCO)

== Main draw ==
Numbers given to the left before players' names show the seedings for the top 16 players in the competition. Players in bold denote match winners.

Round 1 Best of 11 frames
1	Paul Hunter (ENG)	5
13	**Steve Davis** (ENG)	**6**
8	**Peter Ebdon** (ENG)	**6**
14	David Gray (ENG)	0
5	**John Higgins** (SCO)	**6**
12	Chris Small (SCO)	1
4	**Stephen Hendry** (SCO)	**6**
9	Stephen Lee (ENG)	1
3	**Mark Williams** (WAL)	**6**
10	Alan McManus (SCO)	3
6	Matthew Stevens (WAL)	5
11	**Jimmy White** (ENG)	**6**
7	Ken Doherty (IRL)	1
**Ding Junhui** (CHN)	**6**
2	**Ronnie O'Sullivan** (ENG)	**6**
15	Graeme Dott (SCO)	3

Quarter-finals; Best of 11 frames
13	(England) Steve Davis	1
8	(England) **Peter Ebdon**	**6**
5	(Scotland) **John Higgins**	**6**
4	(Scotland) Stephen Hendry	2
3	(Wales) Mark Williams	5
11	(England) **Jimmy White**	**6**
(China) Ding Junhui	2
2	(England) **Ronnie O'Sullivan**	**6**

Semi-finals; Best of 11 frames
8	(England) Peter Ebdon	3
5	(Scotland) **John Higgins**	**6**
11	(England) Jimmy White	1
2	(England) **Ronnie O'Sullivan**	**6**

Final; Best of 19 frames
5	(Scotland) John Higgins	3
2	(England) **Ronnie O'Sullivan**	**10**

== Final ==
Scores in bold indicate winning frame scores and the winning finalist. Breaks over 50 are shown in brackets.

Final: Best of 19 frames. Referee: Paul Collier. Wembley Conference Centre, London, England, 20 February 2005.
John Higgins (5); Scotland	3–**10**	**Ronnie O'Sullivan** (2); England
Afternoon: 9–**97** (95), **130**–0 (54, 76), **61**–7, 0–**107** (107), 24–**89** (58), 1–**102** (97), 0–**135** (102), **73**–45 (53); Evening: 1–**79** (79), 56–**75** (56, 75), 0–**79** (79), 1–**88** (79), 0–**134** (134)
76	Highest break	**134**
0	Century breaks	**3**
4	50+ breaks	**10**

== Century breaks ==
There were 19 century breaks compiled by nine different players during the tournament. The competition's highest break, a 141, was made by Ding in the opening frame of his first round match against Ken Doherty.

- 141, 111 – Ding Junhui
- 134, 130, 123, 107, 105, 102 – Ronnie O'Sullivan
- 116 – Mark Williams
- 115, 109 – Jimmy White
- 110, 108 – Stephen Hendry
- 110, 106 – Peter Ebdon
- 106, 101 – John Higgins
- 101 – Stephen Maguire
- 100 – Marco Fu
