= 1997 Masters (snooker) =

Professional non-ranking snooker tournament, Feb 1997

1997 Benson & Hedges Masters
Tournament information
- Dates: 2–9 February 1997
- Venue: Wembley Conference Centre
- City: London
- Country: England
- Organisation: WPBSA
- Format: Non-ranking event
- Winner's share: £135,000
- Highest break: Steve Davis (ENG) (130)

Final
- Champion: Steve Davis (ENG)
- Runner-up: Ronnie O'Sullivan (ENG)
- Score: 10–8

The 1997 Masters (officially the 1997 Benson & Hedges Masters) was a professional non-ranking snooker tournament that took place between 2 and 9 February 1997 at the Wembley Conference Centre in London, England.

Steve Davis won his third Masters title, nine years after his last win in 1988, by defeating Ronnie O'Sullivan in the final. O'Sullivan, who was playing in his third consecutive Masters final, took an 8–4 lead before Davis came back to win six successive frames and clinch the title with a 10–8 victory.

The final was notable for featuring snooker's first ever streaker, 22-year-old secretary Lianne Crofts, who invaded the playing area at the beginning of the third frame. After stewards removed her from the arena, O'Sullivan amused the crowd by comically wiping the brow of veteran referee John Street, who was refereeing his final match of his career.

The wild-card players included Paul Hunter, who would later go on to win 3 Masters titles in 4 years between 2001 and 2004. The highest break of the tournament was 130 made by Steve Davis.

== Field ==
Stephen Hendry, defending champion and World Champion was the number 1 seed. Places were allocated to the top 16 players in the world rankings. Players seeded 15 and 16 played in the wild-card round against the winner of the qualifying event, Brian Morgan (ranked 49), and Paul Hunter (ranked 78), who was the wild-card selection. Paul Hunter and Brian Morgan were making their debuts in the Masters.

== Prize fund ==
The breakdown of prize money for this year is shown below:

- Winner: £135,000
- Runner-up: £70,000
- High Break Prize: £15,000

== Wild-card round ==
In the preliminary round, the qualifier and wild-card players played the 15th and 16th seeds:

Match	Date		Score	
WC1	Sunday 2 February	Tony Drago (MLT) (15)	2–5	Brian Morgan (ENG)
WC2	Monday 3 February	Mark Williams (WAL) (16)	5–1	Paul Hunter (ENG)

== Main draw ==
Last 16; Best of 11 frames
1	Stephen Hendry (SCO)	6
Brian Morgan (ENG)	1
8	Ronnie O'Sullivan (ENG)	6
11	Dave Harold (ENG)	1
5	Nigel Bond (ENG)	6
12	James Wattana (THA)	1
4	John Parrott (ENG)	6
13	Jimmy White (ENG)	5
3	Peter Ebdon (ENG)	6
9	Darren Morgan (WAL)	4
6	Alan McManus (SCO)	4
10	Steve Davis (ENG)	6
7	Ken Doherty (IRL)	6
14	Alain Robidoux (CAN)	2
2	John Higgins (SCO)	4
16	Mark Williams (WAL)	6

Quarter-finals; Best of 11 frames
1	(Scotland) Stephen Hendry	4
8	(England) Ronnie O'Sullivan	6
5	(England) Nigel Bond	6
4	(England) John Parrott	2
3	(England) Peter Ebdon	4
10	(England) Steve Davis	6
7	(Republic of Ireland) Ken Doherty	6
16	(Wales) Mark Williams	3

Semi-finals; Best of 11 frames
8	(England) Ronnie O'Sullivan	6
5	(England) Nigel Bond	5
10	(England) Steve Davis	6
7	(Republic of Ireland) Ken Doherty	1

Final; Best of 19 frames
8	(England) Ronnie O'Sullivan	8
10	(England) Steve Davis	10

== Final ==
Final: Best of 19 frames. Referee: John Street. Wembley Conference Centre, London, England, 9 February 1997.
Ronnie O'Sullivan (8); England	8–10	Steve Davis (10); England
Afternoon: 116–0 (116), 113–0 (113), 13–72, 67–38, 50–78, 123–0 (63, 60), 46–62 (50), 1–63; Evening: 96–32 (96), 72–52 (72), 122–7 (121), 75–4 (67), 0–109 (64), 27–60, 1–130 (130), 48–63, 46–74 (56), 1–68
121	Highest break	130
3	Century breaks	1
8	50+ breaks	4

== Qualifying ==
Brian Morgan won the qualifying tournament, known as the 1996 Benson & Hedges Championship at the time.

== Century breaks ==
Total: 10

- 130 – Steve Davis
- 121, 116, 113, 108 – Ronnie O'Sullivan
- 115 – Mark Williams
- 109 – Nigel Bond
- 109 – Peter Ebdon
- 108 – Brian Morgan
- 104 – Ken Doherty

Brian Morgan's century was scored in the wild-card round.
