= 1989 Masters (snooker) =

Professional non-ranking snooker tournament, Jan 1989

1989 Benson & Hedges Masters
Tournament information
- Dates: 22–29 January 1989
- Venue: Wembley Conference Centre
- City: London
- Country: England
- Organisation: WPBSA
- Format: Non-ranking event
- Total prize fund: £250,000
- Winner's share: £62,000
- Highest break: Stephen Hendry (SCO) (119)

Final
- Champion: Stephen Hendry (SCO)
- Runner-up: John Parrott (ENG)
- Score: 9–6

The 1989 Masters (officially the 1989 Benson & Hedges Masters) was a professional non-ranking snooker tournament that took place between 22 and 29 January 1989 at the Wembley Conference Centre in London, England. The prize money for the highest break was £6,000. The top 16 players were invited for the tournament.

Stephen Hendry won the Masters at his first attempt after joining the top 16 by defeating John Parrott 9–6 in the final. This was Hendry's first of his five consecutive Masters titles.

The tournament was rocked by a scandal after the first round match between Silvino Francisco and Terry Griffiths on 23 January. After Griffiths beat Francisco 5–1, it was discovered that there had been heavy betting on that exact score. Both players were questioned. Francisco was arrested exactly a year later concerning the 1989 Masters and the 1986 Masters, where he lost 5–1 in the first round to Tony Knowles. In May 1990 he was cleared of involvement in the alleged betting coups.

== Field ==
Steve Davis, defending champion and World Champion was the number 1 seed. The remaining places were allocated to players based on the world rankings. Peter Francisco, Stephen Hendry and Cliff Wilson were making their debuts in the Masters.

== Main draw ==
Last 16; Best of 9 frames
1	Steve Davis (ENG)	5
16	Cliff Wilson (WAL)	2
8	Tony Knowles (ENG)	5
9	Mike Hallett (ENG)	3
5	Terry Griffiths (WAL)	5
12	Silvino Francisco (RSA)	1
4	Stephen Hendry (SCO)	5
13	Willie Thorne (ENG)	2
3	Neal Foulds (ENG)	5
14	Peter Francisco (RSA)	2
6	Cliff Thorburn (CAN)	5
11	Joe Johnson (ENG)	2
7	John Parrott (ENG)	5
10	Dennis Taylor (NIR)	1
2	Jimmy White (ENG)	5
15	John Virgo (ENG)	2

Quarter-finals; Best of 9 frames
1	(England) Steve Davis	5
8	(England) Tony Knowles	0
5	(Wales) Terry Griffiths	3
4	(Scotland) Stephen Hendry	5
3	(England) Neal Foulds	5
6	(Canada) Cliff Thorburn	2
7	(England) John Parrott	5
2	(England) Jimmy White	4

Semi-finals; Best of 11 frames
1	(England) Steve Davis	3
4	(Scotland) Stephen Hendry	6
3	(England) Neal Foulds	5
7	(England) John Parrott	6

Final; Best of 17 frames
4	(Scotland) Stephen Hendry	9
7	(England) John Parrott	6

== Final ==
Final: Best of 17 frames. Referee: John Street; Wembley Conference Centre, London, England, 29 January 1989.
Stephen Hendry; Scotland	9–6	John Parrott; England
First session: 16–97 (93), 58–31, 93–8 (89), 83–39 (62), 36–85 (61), 98–0 (59), 73–4 (61), 30–74 (50), 42–72, 86–44, 85–34 (58), 66–68, 84–38 (64), 8–79, 65–48 (52)
89	Highest break	93
0	Century breaks	0
7	50+ breaks	3

== Century breaks ==
Highest break; £6,000, Total: 3

- 119, 114 – Stephen Hendry
- 102 – Steve Davis
