= 2019 Masters (snooker) =

Professional non-ranking snooker tournament, Jan 2019

2019 Dafabet Masters

Tournament information
- Dates: 13–20 January 2019
- Venue: Alexandra Palace
- City: London
- Country: England
- Organisation: World Snooker
- Format: Non-ranking event
- Total prize fund: £600,000
- Winner's share: £200,000
- Highest break: Luca Brecel (BEL) (140)

Final
- Champion: Judd Trump (ENG)
- Runner-up: Ronnie O'Sullivan (ENG)
- Score: 10–4

The 2019 Masters (officially the 2019 Dafabet Masters) was a professional non-ranking snooker tournament, that took place between 13 and 20 January 2019 in London, England and the second of three Triple Crown events in the 2018–19 snooker season. It was the 45th staging of the Masters, and was broadcast in Europe by the BBC and Eurosport.

Judd Trump reached his first Masters final, while Ronnie O'Sullivan reached the final for a record-extending 13th time. Trump led 7–1 after the afternoon session and went on to win the match 10–4, despite O'Sullivan making two century breaks in the evening session. It was O'Sullivan's heaviest defeat in a Masters final.

Luca Brecel made the highest break of the tournament, a 140 in his first round 6–5 victory over defending champion Mark Allen.

== Tournament summary ==
The 2019 Masters was the second Triple Crown event of the 2018/2019 snooker season, after the 2018 UK Championship, and was held between 13 and 20 January 2019. The Masters event is an invitational tournament, with the top 16 competitors from the snooker world rankings competing. Defending champion Mark Allen was seeded first with world champion Mark Williams seeded second. The remaining places were allocated based on the world rankings after the 2018 UK Championship. Jack Lisowski was making his Masters debut.

As in previous years, the top eight seeds were allocated fixed positions in the draw. The rest of the draw was made by drawing lots during the final of the 2018 UK Championship. With the exception of the final, all matches were played as best-of-11-frame matches.

=== First round ===
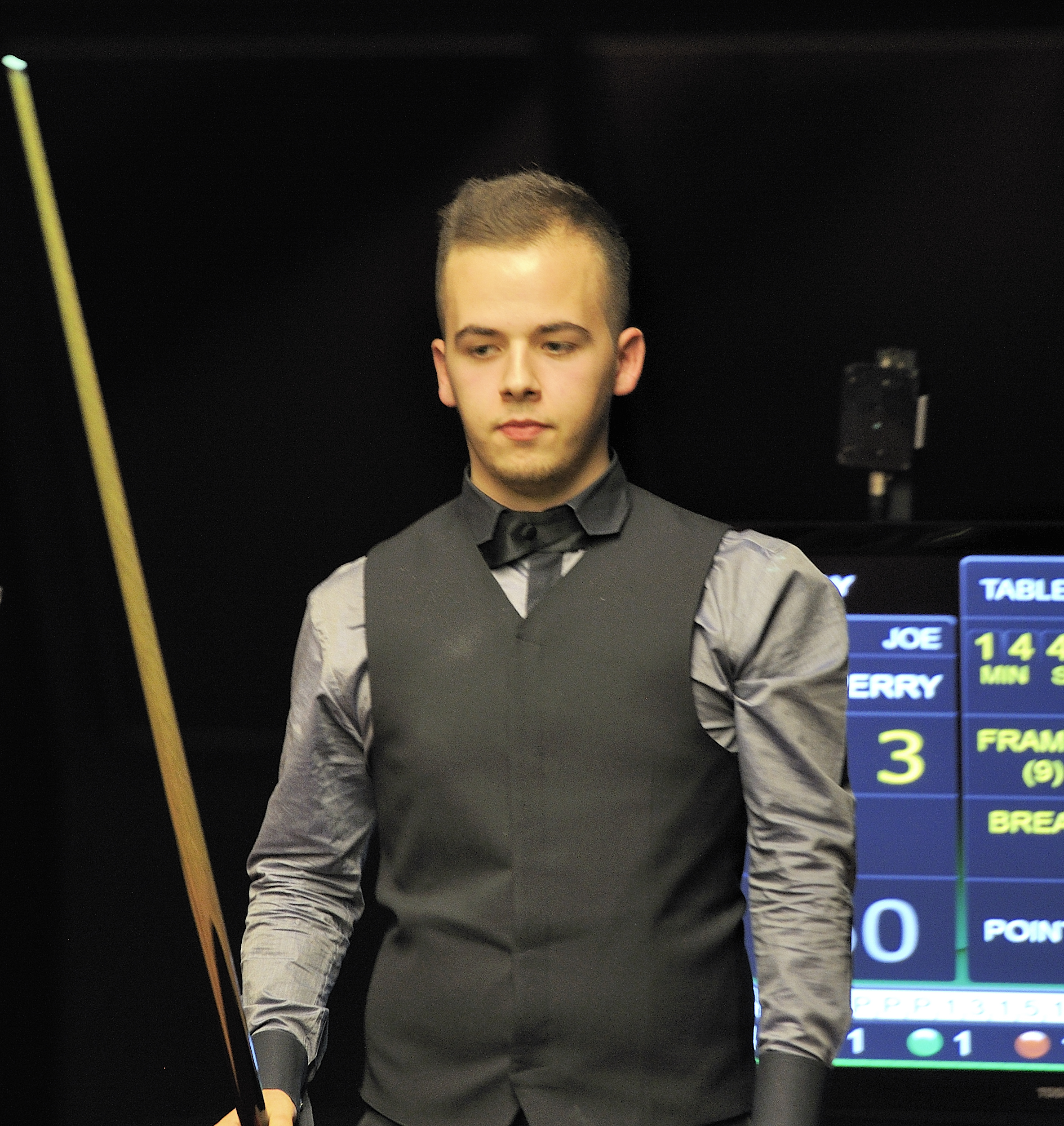
Luca Brecel won his first match at the event, defeating defending champion Mark Allen 6–5.

The highest two seeds lost in the first round. Mark Allen, the defending champion, seeded 1, lost 5–6 to Luca Brecel in the opening match. Brecel led 3–1 before Allen levelled the match at 3–3 with a break of 136. Brecel went ahead winning frame seven (with the tournament high break of 140) and frame nine, but Allen levelled each time by winning frames eight and 10. Brecel took the deciding frame with a break of 58. It was Brecel's first win at the Masters, having lost to Allen in the first round when making his Masters debut the previous year.

The first round match between two Triple Crown winners saw Neil Robertson beat world champion and second seed, Mark Williams 6–3. Williams gained a 3–1 lead and led 57–0 with 59 points left on the table, when he missed a pot on the brown ball which would have won the frame. Robertson made a 59 clearance and then won the remaining four frames of the match.

Two-time Masters winner and fifth seed John Higgins also lost on the opening day, 5–6 to Ryan Day. Higgins led 3–1 but Day won the next three frames to take the lead at 4–3. Day won the final frame with a break of 128, the highest of the match. Ding Junhui took the first five frames of his match against debutant Jack Lisowski, and won 6–1. Ding took advantage of a poor performance from Lisowski, saying, "You have to punish your opponent", after Lisowski's highest break of the match scored 60.

The other four first-round matches all finished 6–2. Stuart Bingham took the opening frame against Ronnie O'Sullivan, however O'Sullivan won the next five, scoring two century breaks. Barry Hawkins defeated Shaun Murphy after winning the first five frames, while Judd Trump beat Kyren Wilson after also taking the opening five frames. To close out the first round, three-time Masters champion Mark Selby defeated Stephen Maguire, despite losing the first frame. Selby made three century breaks and two other breaks above 90.

=== Quarter-finals ===
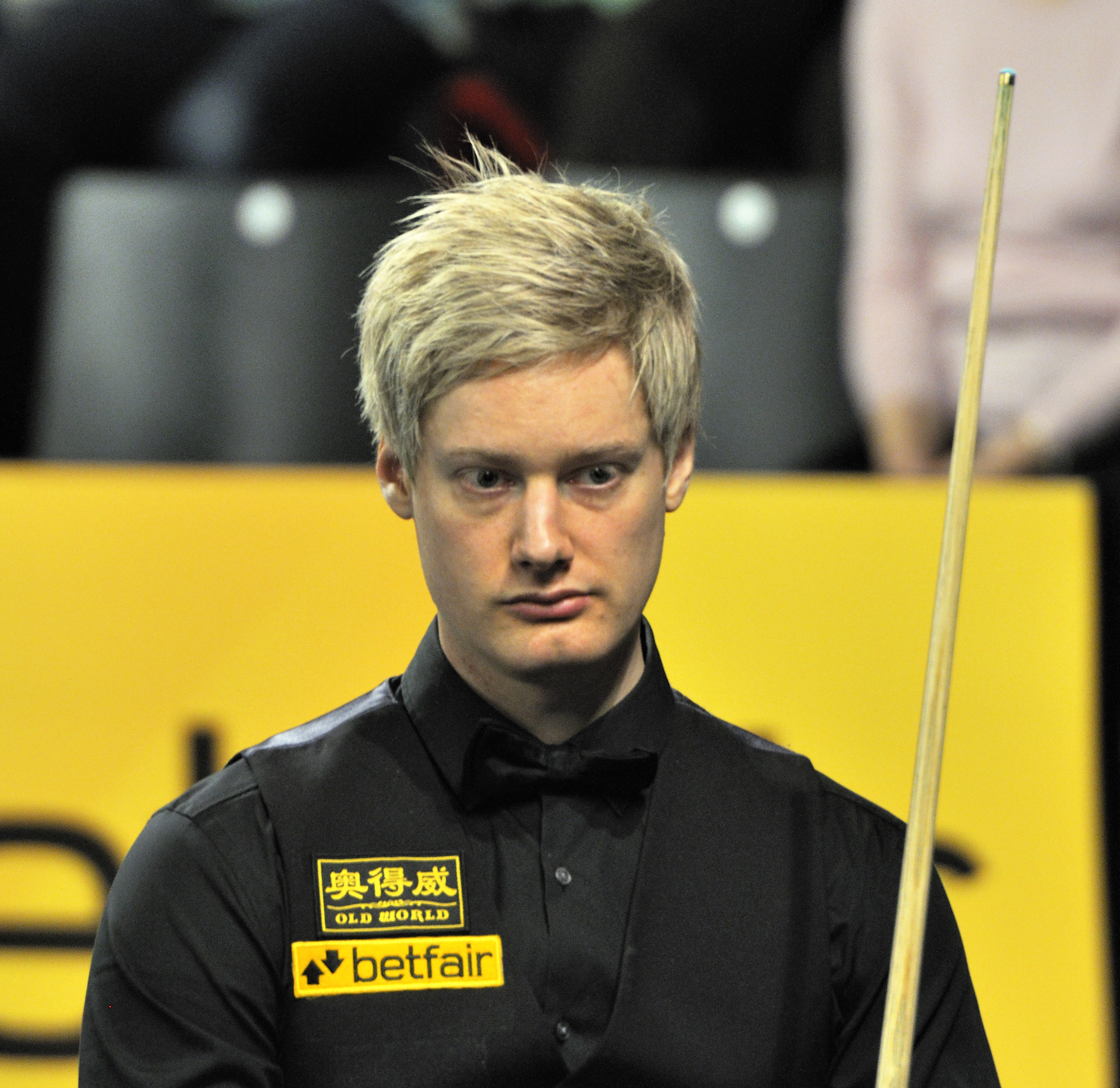
Neil Robertson won five frames in a row to win 6–3 over Barry Hawkins.

In the first quarter-final, Ronnie O'Sullivan defeated Ryan Day 6–3. Leading 66–0 in frame eight, Day had a chance to level the match at 4–4. However, he misjudged a safety shot and O'Sullivan took advantage with a 78 clearance and then made a break of 92 in the next frame to reach his 14th Masters semi-final.

Ding Junhui came through 6–5 against Luca Brecel to reach just his third Masters semi-final, and his first since winning in 2011. With the scores level at 4–4, Ding was forced to concede frame nine; despite being able to make contact with a red ball, he failed to make contact on three consecutive occasions, thus breaking the three miss rule. However, after winning frame 10, he then won the deciding frame with a break of 65 after Brecel had missed a simple red to the middle pocket.

Judd Trump beat Mark Selby 6–2. Trump won the opening two frames which together lasted over an hour. Selby won frame three but Trump took the next three to lead 5–1. Selby won frame seven with a break of 110, but Trump won the match after a 40-minute frame eight. Trump reached his fourth Masters semi-final, having lost his three previous semi-final matches.

Neil Robertson lost the first two frames against Barry Hawkins but won the next five to lead 5–2. Hawkins took frame eight with a 66 clearance but Robertson won frame nine with a break of 72 to win 6–3 and reach his fourth Masters semi-final.

=== Semi-finals ===
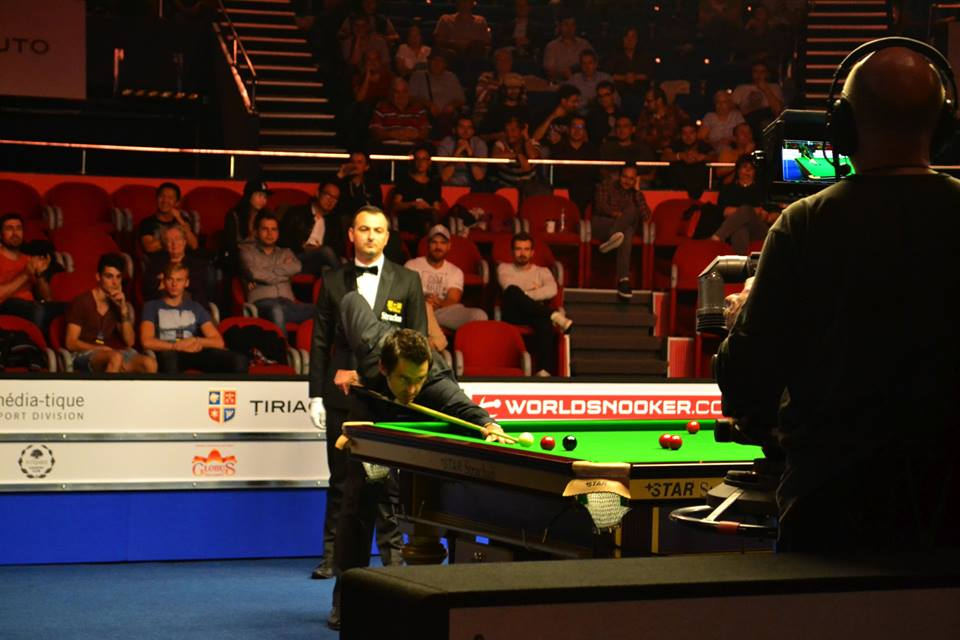
Ronnie O'Sullivan reached his 13th Masters final, defeating Ding Junhui 6–3

Ronnie O'Sullivan defeated Ding Junhui 6–3 in the first semi-final, his 13th Masters semi-final win in 14 attempts. O'Sullivan won the first four frames of the match. Ding then took the next three, winning frame six with a break of 107 and frame seven with a break of 122. In frame seven, Ding potted the 15 red and black balls, before fluking the yellow ball but then missed a difficult shot on the green ball to the middle pocket missing out on the 147th maximum break in snooker history. O'Sullivan responded by taking frame eight and won the match with a break of 93 in frame nine.

Following the match, O'Sullivan consoled Ding, as he had done twelve years earlier at the 2007 Masters final. Ding later said that O'Sullivan's cue ball control won the match. He revealed, "At the end he [O'Sullivan] said he loves me and it is great to play Ronnie because I can see how good my game is. He beat me on the safety play today."

Judd Trump beat Neil Robertson 6–4 in the second semi-final to reach his first Masters final. Trump quickly won two frames before Robertson levelled the match at 2–2, winning a scrappy third frame and then making a 127 clearance in frame four. Trump won three of the next four frames before Robertson had another break of 127. Robertson missed a difficult red in frame 10, after which Trump made a 49 break to win the match.

=== Final ===
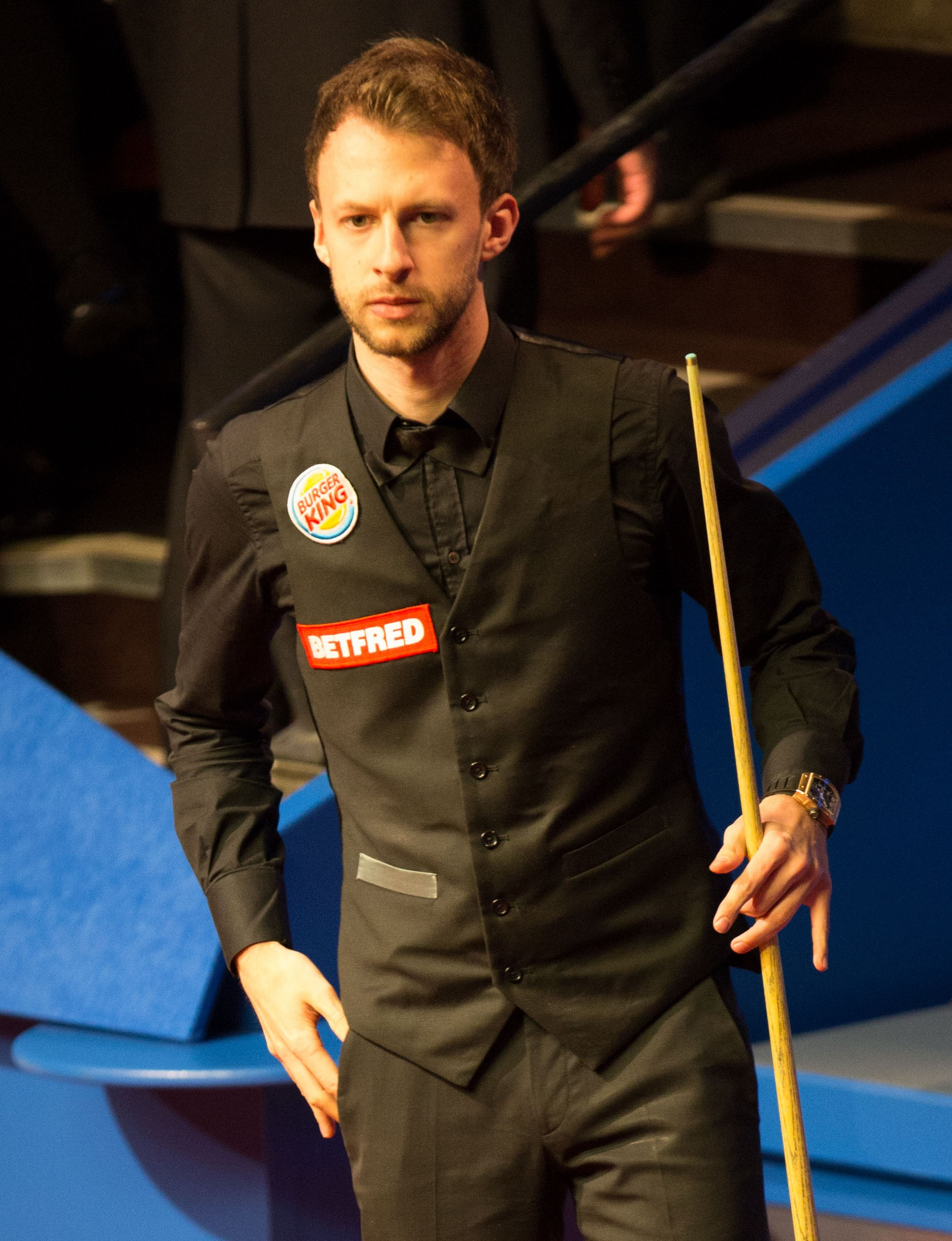
Judd Trump won the event, taking a 7–1 lead, and winning 10–4.

The final saw Judd Trump against Ronnie O'Sullivan on 20 January 2019. The match was played over two sessions of play in a best-of-19-frame match. The final was refereed by Jan Verhaas, his eighth Masters final.

Trump won the first four frames to take a 4–0 lead, with O'Sullivan not scoring a point until the third frame. O'Sullivan won the first frame after the interval, but Trump won the following three frames and took a 7–1 lead going into the evening session. O'Sullivan later won frames nine and 11 with a break of 114, but Trump won frames 10 and 12 with breaks of 88 and 68, to take a 9–3 lead at the interval. O'Sullivan won the first frame after the interval with a break of 109, however Trump won frame 14 with a break of 53 to win the match 10–4.

After the final, Trump said that he was "sick of watching other players win". O'Sullivan commented that Trump "is a great talent and should be winning tournaments". BBC broadcaster and former UK Championship winner John Virgo commented that Trump had "come of age" with the victory. Trump celebrated the victory with his family, including his brother and training partner Jack Trump, saying: "My brother Jack gave up his job to help me on tour this season, it has been amazing to have him with me, making me practice. With my mum and dad, it makes for a family success."

Immediately after receiving his runners up medal from Barry Hearn, O'Sullivan dismissed his medal, giving it to a member of the crowd. AS Roma striker Stephan El Shaarawy attended the final match between his "favourite players", having scored against Torino the day before.

== Prize fund ==
The event's total prize pool was identical to that of the previous year. The highest break prize of £10,000 was won by Luca Brecel, for his 140 break in the first round match against Mark Allen. The breakdown of prize money is shown below:

- Winner: £200,000
- Runner-up: £90,000
- Semi-finals: £50,000
- Quarter-finals: £25,000
- Last 16: £12,500
- Highest break: £10,000
- Total: £600,000

== Tournament draw ==
First round Best of 11 frames
1	Mark Allen (NIR)	5
15	Luca Brecel (BEL)	6
8	Ding Junhui (CHN)	6
16	Jack Lisowski (ENG)	1
5	John Higgins (SCO)	5
13	Ryan Day (WAL)	6
4	Ronnie O'Sullivan (ENG)	6
12	Stuart Bingham (ENG)	2
3	Mark Selby (ENG)	6
14	Stephen Maguire (SCO)	2
6	Judd Trump (ENG)	6
10	Kyren Wilson (ENG)	2
7	Barry Hawkins (ENG)	6
11	Shaun Murphy (ENG)	2
2	Mark Williams (WAL)	3
9	Neil Robertson (AUS)	6

Quarter-finals; Best of 11 frames
15	(Belgium) Luca Brecel	5
8	(China) Ding Junhui	6
13	(Wales) Ryan Day	3
4	(England) Ronnie O'Sullivan	6
3	(England) Mark Selby	2
6	(England) Judd Trump	6
7	(England) Barry Hawkins	3
9	(Australia) Neil Robertson	6

Semi-finals; Best of 11 frames
8	(China) Ding Junhui	3
4	(England) Ronnie O'Sullivan	6
6	(England) Judd Trump	6
9	(Australia) Neil Robertson	4

Final; Best of 19 frames
4	(England) Ronnie O'Sullivan	4
6	(England) Judd Trump	10

== Final ==
Final: Best of 19 frames. Referee: Jan Verhaas. Alexandra Palace, London, England, 20 January 2019.
Ronnie O'Sullivan (4); England	4–10	Judd Trump (6); England
Afternoon: 0–89 (89), 0–87 (87), 8–58, 37–80 (56), 101–0 (69), 37–90 (66), 0–86, 26–74 (66); Evening: 69–13, 0–88 (88), 114–23 (114), 25–69 (68), 113–4 (109), 16–68 (53)
114	Highest break	89
2	Century breaks	0
3	50+ breaks	8

== Century breaks ==
A total of 24 century breaks were made during the tournament, the highest of which a 140 by Luca Brecel.

- 140 – Luca Brecel
- 136 – Mark Allen
- 134, 119, 114, 111, 109 – Ronnie O'Sullivan
- 133, 125, 115, 110 – Mark Selby
- 128, 111 – Ryan Day
- 128, 101 – Judd Trump
- 127, 127, 102 – Neil Robertson
- 125, 123, 122, 107, 105 – Ding Junhui
- 124 – Barry Hawkins

== Coverage ==
The tournament was broadcast live in the United Kingdom by BBC Sport, as well as on EuroSport in Europe. Worldwide, the event was covered by China Central Television and Superstars Online in China and Sky Sports in New Zealand. NowTV simulcasted the event in Hong Kong with additional commentary. The event was the first Snooker event to feature titantron videos on player entrances.
