= 1994 Masters (snooker) =

Professional non-ranking snooker tournament, Feb 1994

1994 Benson & Hedges Masters
Tournament information
- Dates: 6–13 February 1994
- Venue: Wembley Conference Centre
- City: London
- Country: England
- Organisation: WPBSA
- Format: Non-ranking event
- Total prize fund: £415,000
- Winner's share: £115,000
- Highest break: Alan McManus (SCO) (132)

Final
- Champion: Alan McManus (SCO)
- Runner-up: Stephen Hendry (SCO)
- Score: 9–8

The 1994 Masters (officially the 1994 Benson & Hedges Masters) was a professional non-ranking snooker tournament that took place between 6 and 13 February 1994 at the Wembley Conference Centre in London, England.

Defending champion Stephen Hendry met Alan McManus in the final. Hendry had won the previous five Masters tournaments and was undefeated in 23 matches since making his debut in 1989. By comparison McManus had lost all six of the important finals he had contested since his first final, the 1992 Asian Open. The previous week he had lost to Steve Davis in the final of the Welsh Open. McManus won the first three frames, but Hendry won the next three to level the match, including a break of 115 in frame 5, Hendry's first century of the tournament. McManus won the 7th frame to take a 4–3 lead at the end of the afternoon session. Hendry had breaks of 80, 49, 62 and 58 to win four of the first five frames in the evening and take a 7–5 lead. McManus had missed a simple black to lose frame 10 after he had needed three snookers. McManus levelled the match again by winning the next two frames before losing frame 15 and winning a tense frame 16. In the deciding frame Hendry missed an ambitious plant after which McManus made a 76 break, Hendry conceding with only 59 on the table. McManus won the first prize of £115,000. He also won a further £10,000 for making the highest break of the tournament, a 132 total clearance in the sixth frame of his first round match against Nigel Bond.

== Field ==
Stephen Hendry, defending champion and World Champion was the number 1 seed. Places were allocated to the top 16 players in the world rankings. Players seeded 15 and 16 played in the wild-card round against the winner of the qualifying event, Ronnie O'Sullivan (ranked 57), and Peter Ebdon (ranked 21), who was the wild-card selection. Peter Ebdon, David Roe and 18-year-old Ronnie O'Sullivan were making their debuts in the Masters.

== Wild-card round ==
In the preliminary round, the qualifier and wild-card players played the 15th and 16th seeds:

Match	Date		Score	
WC1	Sunday 6 February	Dennis Taylor (NIR) (15)	5–1	Ronnie O'Sullivan (ENG)
WC2	Monday 7 February	David Roe (ENG) (16)	1–5	Peter Ebdon (ENG)

== Main draw ==
Last 16; Best of 9 frames
1	Stephen Hendry (SCO)	5
10	Darren Morgan (WAL)	2
8	Terry Griffiths (WAL)	4
13	Steve James (ENG)	5
5	James Wattana (THA)	5
12	Martin Clark (ENG)	4
4	Steve Davis (ENG)	2
Peter Ebdon (ENG)	5
3	Jimmy White (ENG)	0
11	Ken Doherty (IRL)	5
6	Alan McManus (SCO)	5
9	Nigel Bond (ENG)	2
7	Willie Thorne (ENG)	0
15	Dennis Taylor (NIR)	5
2	John Parrott (ENG)	3
14	Neal Foulds (ENG)	5

Quarter-finals; Best of 9 frames
1	(Scotland) Stephen Hendry	5
13	(England) Steve James	2
5	(Thailand) James Wattana	5
(England) Peter Ebdon	4
11	(Republic of Ireland) Ken Doherty	1
6	(Scotland) Alan McManus	5
15	(Northern Ireland) Dennis Taylor	1
14	(England) Neal Foulds	5

Semi-finals; Best of 11 frames
1	(Scotland) Stephen Hendry	6
5	(Thailand) James Wattana	2
6	(Scotland) Alan McManus	6
14	(England) Neal Foulds	4

Final; Best of 17 frames
1	(Scotland) Stephen Hendry	8
6	(Scotland) Alan McManus	9

== Final ==
Final: Best of 17 frames. Referee: Alan Chamberlain. Wembley Conference Centre, London, England, 13 February 1994.
Stephen Hendry (1); Scotland	8–9	Alan McManus (6); Scotland
Afternoon: 46–83 (83), 25–78 (55), 52–63, 83–0, 127–0 (115), 75–43 (67), 21–67 (61); Evening: 80–32 (80), 30–68, 73–61, 72–21 (62), 71–29 (58), 23–62, 1–61, 105–14 (69), 50–72, 0–76 (76)
115	Highest break	83
1	Century breaks	0
6	50+ breaks	4

== Qualifying ==
Ronnie O'Sullivan won the qualifying tournament, known as the 1993 Benson & Hedges Championship at the time which took place in Edinburgh between 6 and 10 November 1993.

== Century breaks ==
Total: 7

- 132 – Alan McManus
- 130, 104 – James Wattana
- 119 – Ken Doherty
- 115 – Stephen Hendry
- 113, 112 – Peter Ebdon

Peter Ebdon's 112 was scored in the wild-card round.
