= 1993 Masters (snooker) =

Professional non-ranking snooker tournament, Feb 1993

1993 Benson & Hedges Masters
Tournament information
- Dates: 7–14 February 1993
- Venue: Wembley Conference Centre
- City: London
- Country: England
- Organisation: WPBSA
- Format: Non-ranking event
- Highest break: Jimmy White (ENG) (134)

Final
- Champion: Stephen Hendry (SCO)
- Runner-up: James Wattana (THA)
- Score: 9–5

The 1993 Masters (officially the 1993 Benson & Hedges Masters) was a professional non-ranking snooker tournament that took place between 7 and 14 February 1993 at the Wembley Conference Centre in London, England.

Stephen Hendry retained the title by beating James Wattana 9–5 in the final. After the final the Benson & Hedges Masters trophy was given to Hendry to keep for winning the event five times in a row.

== Field ==
Stephen Hendry, defending champion and World Champion was the number 1 seed. Places were allocated to the top 16 players in the world rankings. Players seeded 15 and 16 played in the wild-card round against the winner of the qualifying event, Chris Small (ranked 75), and Ken Doherty (ranked 21), who was the wild-card selection. Nigel Bond, Darren Morgan and Chris Small were making their debuts in the Masters.

== Wild-card round ==
In the preliminary round, the wild-card players plays the 15th and 16th seeds:

Match	Date		Score	
WC1	Sunday 7 February	Willie Thorne (ENG) (15)	5–3	Chris Small (SCO)
WC2	Monday 8 February	Darren Morgan (WAL) (16)	3–5	Ken Doherty (IRL)

== Main draw ==
Last 16; Best of 9 frames
1	Stephen Hendry (SCO)	5
Ken Doherty (IRL)	4
8	Gary Wilkinson (ENG)	5
14	Alain Robidoux (CAN)	0
5	Neal Foulds (ENG)	1
13	Alan McManus (SCO)	5
4	Steve Davis (ENG)	5
9	Nigel Bond (ENG)	2
3	Jimmy White (ENG)	5
15	Willie Thorne (ENG)	2
6	Terry Griffiths (WAL)	0
10	Steve James (ENG)	5
7	James Wattana (THA)	5
12	Martin Clark (ENG)	2
2	John Parrott (ENG)	5
11	Dennis Taylor (NIR)	4

Quarter-finals; Best of 9 frames
1	(Scotland) Stephen Hendry	5
8	(England) Gary Wilkinson	2
13	(Scotland) Alan McManus	5
4	(England) Steve Davis	4
3	(England) Jimmy White	5
10	(England) Steve James	3
7	(Thailand) James Wattana	5
2	(England) John Parrott	3

Semi-finals; Best of 11 frames
1	(Scotland) Stephen Hendry	6
13	(Scotland) Alan McManus	4
3	(England) Jimmy White	3
7	(Thailand) James Wattana	6

Final; Best of 17 frames
1	(Scotland) Stephen Hendry	9
7	(Thailand) James Wattana	5

== Final ==
Final: Best of 17 frames. Referee: John Street; Wembley Conference Centre, London, England, 14 February 1993.
Stephen Hendry; Scotland	9–5	James Wattana; Thailand
First session: 14–59, 96–42 (96), 72–0 (52), 44–77, 90–21, 25–59 (50), 74–14 (67), 113–1 (54, 55), 81–22 (81), 9–107 (107), 74–12 (52), 127–1 (62, 65), 16–75, 74–1
96	Highest break	107
0	Century breaks	1
9	50+ breaks	2

== Qualifying ==
Chris Small won the qualifying tournament, known as the 1992 Benson & Hedges Championship at the time. The event carried ranking points, but only ten percent of the usual tariff.

== Century breaks ==
Total: 11

- 134 – Jimmy White
- 131, 129, 105, 105, 101 – Stephen Hendry
- 131 – John Parrott
- 107 – James Wattana
- 106 – Steve Davis
- 101 – Darren Morgan
- 100 – Gary Wilkinson

Darren Morgan's century was scored in the wild-card round.
