= Masters (snooker) =

Snooker tournament

The Masters

Tournament information
- Venue: Alexandra Palace (since 2012)
- Location: London
- Country: England
- Established: 1975
- Organisation(s): World Snooker Tour
- Format: Non-ranking event
- Total prize fund: £725,000
- Recent edition: 2026
- Current champion: Kyren Wilson (ENG)

The Masters is a professional invitational snooker tournament. Held every year since 1975, it is the second-longest-running professional snooker tournament after the World Championship. It is one of the three Triple Crown events, along with the UK Championship and the World Championship. Although not a ranking event, it is regarded as one of the most prestigious tournaments on the World Snooker Tour. The reigning champion is Kyren Wilson, who won his first masters title in 2026, defeating John Higgins 10–6.

The Masters began in 1975 as an invitational event for the top 10 players. The inaugural champion was John Spencer. Since 1984, the standard invitees have been the top 16 players in the world rankings, with the addition of two or three wild-card places in tournaments held between 1990 and 2010.

Twelve players have won the tournament more than once. Ronnie O'Sullivan has won a record eight titles. Stephen Hendry has won six titles, including a record five consecutive wins from 1989 to 1993. Steve Davis, Paul Hunter, Mark Selby, and Cliff Thorburn have won three titles each, and Alex Higgins, John Higgins, Shaun Murphy, Neil Robertson, Judd Trump and Mark Williams have won two each. O'Sullivan holds records as both the tournament's youngest and oldest winner, having won his first title in 1995, aged 19 years and 69 days, and his eighth title in 2024, aged 48 years and 40 days. John Higgins has made the most Masters appearances, with 32 as of 2026. In 2016, the Masters trophy was renamed the Paul Hunter Trophy in honour of the former champion, who won the title three times in four years from 2001 to 2004, before he died in 2006 aged 27.

Six maximum breaks have been made in the history of the tournament. Kirk Stevens made the first in 1984, Ding Junhui made the second in 2007, and Marco Fu made the third in 2015. Ding and Mark Allen made the fourth and fifth maximums respectively at the 2024 event. Shaun Murphy made the sixth maximum at the 2025 event.

== History ==
=== 1975–1983 ===
The tournament was held for the first time in 1975 at the West Centre Hotel in London, when ten leading players were invited. The event was sponsored by the cigarette company Benson & Hedges. John Spencer won the inaugural tournament by defeating Ray Reardon 9–8, winning the deciding frame on a re-spotted black. The following year the event moved to the New London Theatre and in 1979 to the Wembley Conference Centre. In 1981 the number of invited players was increased to 12, then increased again to 16 in 1983.

=== 1984–2003 ===
From 1984 onwards the top 16 players in the world rankings were automatically invited to the tournament. In 1984, Kirk Stevens became the first player to make a maximum break at the event against Jimmy White in the semi-final. In 1988, Mike Hallett became the first and to date only player to be whitewashed in a Masters final, losing 0–9 to Steve Davis. Stephen Hendry maintained an unbeaten record in the event, a run which included five successive championship victories, from his first appearance in 1989 until his defeat by Alan McManus in a final-frame decider in the 1994 final. Hallett reached his second final in four years in 1991, but lost 8–9 against Hendry.

In 1990 the sponsors introduced two wild-cards, granted by the game's governing body at their discretion, who would play wild-card matches against the players seeded 15th and 16th for a place in the first round of the tournament. The Benson & Hedges Championship was introduced for the 1991 tournament; the winner was granted one of the two wild-card places at that season's Masters tournament, while the other wild-card place continued to be granted by the governing body.

In the 1997 final, Steve Davis defeated Ronnie O'Sullivan in a match disrupted by a streaker. Davis came back from 4–8 down to win the remaining six frames in a row, clinching the final at 10–8. The 1998 final went down to a re-spotted black in the deciding frame; Mark Williams defeated Stephen Hendry 10–9 after having trailed 6–9. In the 2000 final, Ken Doherty missed the final black in a 147 attempt, the first time this had happened in competition. Doherty eventually lost to Matthew Stevens.

=== 2004–present ===
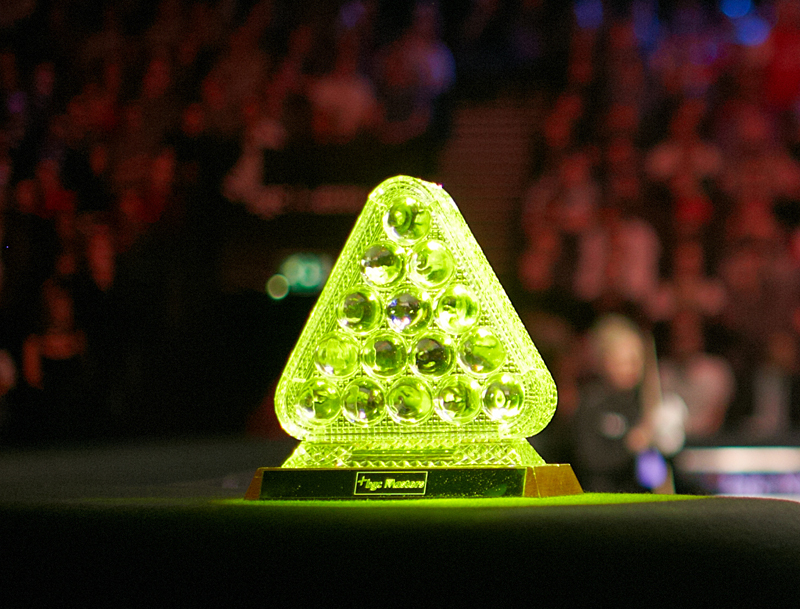
Masters trophy used since 2004

After 2003, Benson & Hedges ended their sponsorship of the Masters tournament due to UK restrictions on tobacco advertising. The 2004 event was not sponsored. Rileys Club sponsored the event in 2005. There was no separate qualifying competition for the 2005 event, both wild-card places being awarded by the governing body, but the qualifying event returned the following season. SAGA Insurance took over sponsorship of the Masters in 2006 and agreed a deal later the same year to sponsor the event until 2009. The tournament was held at the Wembley Conference Centre for the last time in 2006, before the venue was demolished months later to make way for redevelopment.

Following the death of Paul Hunter in October 2006, Jimmy White led calls for the Masters trophy or tournament to be renamed in honour of Hunter, who had won the title three times in four years between 2001 and 2004. Hunter's widow Lindsey later expressed her wishes for the trophy to be renamed, claiming that "...everybody expected it. Every player I've spoken to, every fan, thought it would be a definite". The sport's governing body, World Snooker, elected not to rename the trophy, making the following statement: "Our board unanimously agreed that the Paul Hunter Scholarship was the most fitting tribute. Just as Hunter himself rose swiftly through the amateur ranks, the scholarship will give a gifted young player the chance to fulfil his talent through elite training." It would be another nine years before the decision was taken to rename the trophy in honour of Hunter. On 20 April 2016, World Snooker announced the renaming of the trophy for the 2017 event, with chairman Barry Hearn stating that the organisation had "messed up" by not doing so sooner.

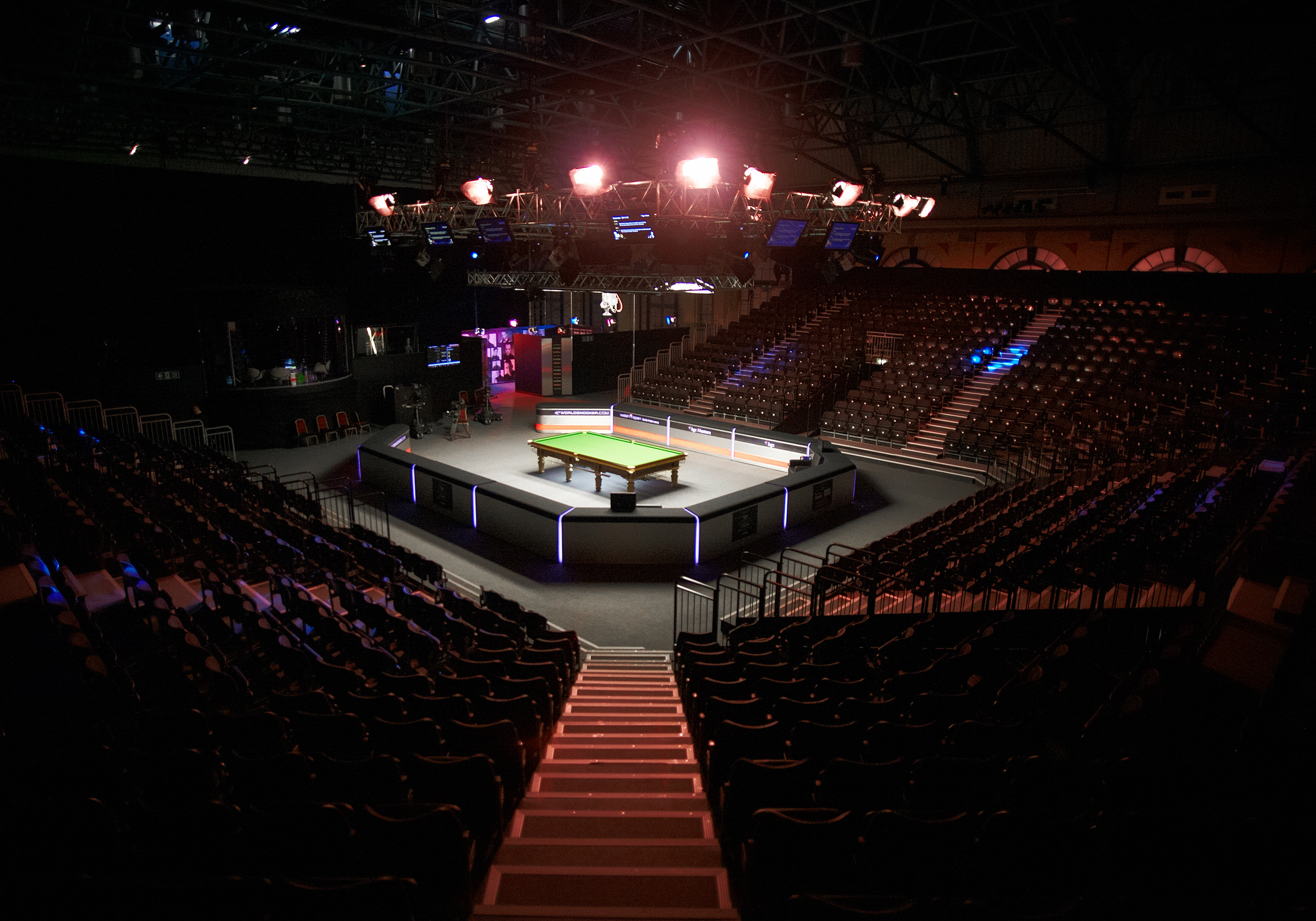
Arena inside the Alexandra Palace during the 2012 event

Ronnie O'Sullivan appeared in four successive Masters finals from 2004 to 2007, winning the event in 2005 and 2007. Paul Hunter won the first of these four finals to claim his third Masters title in four years; recovering from 2–7 down, he made five century breaks on the way to a 10–9 victory. O'Sullivan defeated John Higgins in the 2005 final with a decisive 10–3 scoreline. The pair met in the final again the following year, both players producing a very high standard of play throughout the match. O'Sullivan won the second and third frames with back-to-back total clearances of 138 and 139, but lost all of the next five frames. He made a break of 60 in the deciding frame, before Higgins took the opportunity to make a clearance of 64, winning the title on the black. However, O'Sullivan redeemed himself in 2007 by defeating Ding Junhui 10–3 in the final and then comforting the clearly upset youngster afterwards. A week earlier, Ding had become the second player to compile a maximum break at the Masters, in his match against Anthony Hamilton in the wild-card round.

The Masters was held at Wembley Arena for the first time in 2007. In a slight change to the format, one extra discretionary wild-card place was awarded, bringing the total number of players up to 19. However, the original format with just two wild-card players was reinstated in 2008. SAGA Insurance pulled out of their sponsorship deal in the summer of 2008, leaving the Masters unsponsored in 2009. PokerStars.com sponsored the event in 2010, and the 2011 sponsor was Ladbrokes Mobile. The separate qualifying competition was not held for the 2011 event and the use of wild-cards was discontinued at the same time. The 2011 final made history as it was the first to feature two Asian players. Wembley Arena was used as the venue for the last time in 2011, after which the tournament moved to the Alexandra Palace in London. BGC Partners sponsored the Masters in 2012, and the 2013 event was sponsored by Betfair. From 2014 to 2020 the tournament was sponsored by Dafabet. World Championship sponsor Betfred sponsored the Masters in 2021, and the 2022 tournament was sponsored by Cazoo for the first time.

Ronnie O'Sullivan won his seventh Masters title in 2017, overtaking Stephen Hendry's previous record of six. This was O'Sullivan's third Masters title in four years, having also won in 2014 and 2016. He reached the final again in 2019, extending his record number of appearances in the final to 13, in 25 overall appearances at the Masters tournament; however, he was outplayed by Judd Trump who claimed his first Masters title with a solid 10–4 victory. O'Sullivan chose not to enter the tournament in 2020.

== Format ==
The format has been largely unchanged since 1984 and the tournament generally involves the leading 16 players in the world rankings. There was a wild-card round from 1990 to 2010.

The defending Masters champion is seeded 1 while the current World Champion is seeded 2 (assuming that it is a different player). The remaining places are then allocated to the top players in the world rankings, seeded in order of those rankings. Since the defending champion and current World Champion are normally ranked in the top 16, the field generally consists of the top 16-ranked players. The exceptions have been:

- In 2006, World Champion Shaun Murphy was ranked 21 so that Ian McCulloch, ranked 16, was not automatically invited. McCulloch was, however, the wild-card choice.
- In 2013, Stephen Lee, ranked 9, did not play because he was suspended and so Mark Davis, ranked 17, was invited. World Champion Ronnie O'Sullivan, ranked 20, chose not to enter.
- In 2014, World Champion Ronnie O'Sullivan was ranked 24 so that Graeme Dott, ranked 16, was not invited.
- In 2015, Ali Carter was seeded 13, despite being ranked 18, because of illness that had stopped him from playing for an extended period, and so Graeme Dott, ranked 16, was not invited.
- In 2018, Stuart Bingham, ranked 12, did not play because he was suspended and so Liang Wenbo, ranked 17, was invited.
- In 2020, Ronnie O'Sullivan, ranked 3, chose not to enter and so Ali Carter, ranked 17, was invited.
- In 2021, Judd Trump and Jack Lisowski tested positive for COVID-19 and were forced to withdraw. They were replaced by Joe Perry, ranked 18, and Gary Wilson, ranked 19. Anthony McGill, ranked 17, declined to travel to the event.
- In 2023, Yan Bingtao and Zhao Xintong were suspended amid a match-fixing investigation. David Gilbert and Hossein Vafaei, ranked 17th and 18th at the cutoff, replaced Yan and Zhao respectively.
- In 2025, Neil Robertson, ranked 17th, replaced defending champion and first seed Ronnie O'Sullivan who withdrew.
- In 2026, Chris Wakelin, ranked 17th, replaced Ronnie O'Sullivan, who withdrew citing medical reasons.

In 1984, and from 1986 to 1990, the draw was determined by the seedings, with seed 1 playing seed 16, 2 playing 15, 3 playing 14, etc. A slightly different system was used in 1985. With the introduction of the wild-card round in 1990, this system meant that seeds 15 and 16 needed to win a match to reach the last 16, where they would immediately play either of the first two seeds, generally the defending Masters champion and the World Champion. A change was introduced in 1991 so that seeds 9 to 16 were randomly drawn to play seeds 1 to 8.

In 1996 the last-16 and quarter-final rounds were extended from 9 to 11 frames while the final was extended from 17 to 19 frames. Wild-card matches were extended from 9 to 11 frames in 1999.

== Winners ==
Year	Winner	Runner-up	Final score	Season	Venue
1975	John Spencer (ENG)	Ray Reardon (WAL)	9–8	1974/75	West Centre Hotel, London
1976	Ray Reardon (WAL)	Graham Miles (ENG)	7–3	1975/76	New London Theatre, London
1977	Doug Mountjoy (WAL)	Ray Reardon (WAL)	7–6	1976/77	New London Theatre, London
1978	Alex Higgins (NIR)	Cliff Thorburn (CAN)	7–5	1977/78	New London Theatre, London
1979	Perrie Mans (SAF)	Alex Higgins (NIR)	8–4	1978/79	Wembley Conference Centre, London
1980	Terry Griffiths (WAL)	Alex Higgins (NIR)	9–5	1979/80	Wembley Conference Centre, London
1981	Alex Higgins (NIR)	Terry Griffiths (WAL)	9–6	1980/81	Wembley Conference Centre, London
1982	Steve Davis (ENG)	Terry Griffiths (WAL)	9–5	1981/82	Wembley Conference Centre, London
1983	Cliff Thorburn (CAN)	Ray Reardon (WAL)	9–7	1982/83	Wembley Conference Centre, London
1984	Jimmy White (ENG)	Terry Griffiths (WAL)	9–5	1983/84	Wembley Conference Centre, London
1985	Cliff Thorburn (CAN)	Doug Mountjoy (WAL)	9–6	1984/85	Wembley Conference Centre, London
1986	Cliff Thorburn (CAN)	Jimmy White (ENG)	9–5	1985/86	Wembley Conference Centre, London
1987	Dennis Taylor (NIR)	Alex Higgins (NIR)	9–8	1986/87	Wembley Conference Centre, London
1988	Steve Davis (ENG)	Mike Hallett (ENG)	9–0	1987/88	Wembley Conference Centre, London
1989	Stephen Hendry (SCO)	John Parrott (ENG)	9–6	1988/89	Wembley Conference Centre, London
1990	Stephen Hendry (SCO)	John Parrott (ENG)	9–4	1989/90	Wembley Conference Centre, London
1991	Stephen Hendry (SCO)	Mike Hallett (ENG)	9–8	1990/91	Wembley Conference Centre, London
1992	Stephen Hendry (SCO)	John Parrott (ENG)	9–4	1991/92	Wembley Conference Centre, London
1993	Stephen Hendry (SCO)	James Wattana (THA)	9–5	1992/93	Wembley Conference Centre, London
1994	Alan McManus (SCO)	Stephen Hendry (SCO)	9–8	1993/94	Wembley Conference Centre, London
1995	Ronnie O'Sullivan (ENG)	John Higgins (SCO)	9–3	1994/95	Wembley Conference Centre, London
1996	Stephen Hendry (SCO)	Ronnie O'Sullivan (ENG)	10–5	1995/96	Wembley Conference Centre, London
1997	Steve Davis (ENG)	Ronnie O'Sullivan (ENG)	10–8	1996/97	Wembley Conference Centre, London
1998	Mark Williams (WAL)	Stephen Hendry (SCO)	10–9	1997/98	Wembley Conference Centre, London
1999	John Higgins (SCO)	Ken Doherty (IRL)	10–8	1998/99	Wembley Conference Centre, London
2000	Matthew Stevens (WAL)	Ken Doherty (IRL)	10–8	1999/00	Wembley Conference Centre, London
2001	Paul Hunter (ENG)	Fergal O'Brien (IRL)	10–9	2000/01	Wembley Conference Centre, London
2002	Paul Hunter (ENG)	Mark Williams (WAL)	10–9	2001/02	Wembley Conference Centre, London
2003	Mark Williams (WAL)	Stephen Hendry (SCO)	10–4	2002/03	Wembley Conference Centre, London
2004	Paul Hunter (ENG)	Ronnie O'Sullivan (ENG)	10–9	2003/04	Wembley Conference Centre, London
2005	Ronnie O'Sullivan (ENG)	John Higgins (SCO)	10–3	2004/05	Wembley Conference Centre, London
2006	John Higgins (SCO)	Ronnie O'Sullivan (ENG)	10–9	2005/06	Wembley Conference Centre, London
2007	Ronnie O'Sullivan (ENG)	Ding Junhui (CHN)	10–3	2006/07	Wembley Arena, London
2008	Mark Selby (ENG)	Stephen Lee (ENG)	10–3	2007/08	Wembley Arena, London
2009	Ronnie O'Sullivan (ENG)	Mark Selby (ENG)	10–8	2008/09	Wembley Arena, London
2010	Mark Selby (ENG)	Ronnie O'Sullivan (ENG)	10–9	2009/10	Wembley Arena, London
2011	Ding Junhui (CHN)	Marco Fu (HKG)	10–4	2010/11	Wembley Arena, London
2012	Neil Robertson (AUS)	Shaun Murphy (ENG)	10–6	2011/12	Alexandra Palace, London
2013	Mark Selby (ENG)	Neil Robertson (AUS)	10–6	2012/13	Alexandra Palace, London
2014	Ronnie O'Sullivan (ENG)	Mark Selby (ENG)	10–4	2013/14	Alexandra Palace, London
2015	Shaun Murphy (ENG)	Neil Robertson (AUS)	10–2	2014/15	Alexandra Palace, London
2016	Ronnie O'Sullivan (ENG)	Barry Hawkins (ENG)	10–1	2015/16	Alexandra Palace, London
2017	Ronnie O'Sullivan (ENG)	Joe Perry (ENG)	10–7	2016/17	Alexandra Palace, London
2018	Mark Allen (NIR)	Kyren Wilson (ENG)	10–7	2017/18	Alexandra Palace, London
2019	Judd Trump (ENG)	Ronnie O'Sullivan (ENG)	10–4	2018/19	Alexandra Palace, London
2020	Stuart Bingham (ENG)	Ali Carter (ENG)	10–8	2019/20	Alexandra Palace, London
2021	Yan Bingtao (CHN)	John Higgins (SCO)	10–8	2020/21	Marshall Arena, Milton Keynes
2022	Neil Robertson (AUS)	Barry Hawkins (ENG)	10–4	2021/22	Alexandra Palace, London
2023	Judd Trump (ENG)	Mark Williams (WAL)	10–8	2022/23	Alexandra Palace, London
2024	Ronnie O'Sullivan (ENG)	Ali Carter (ENG)	10–7	2023/24	Alexandra Palace, London
2025	Shaun Murphy (ENG)	Kyren Wilson (ENG)	10–7	2024/25	Alexandra Palace, London
2026	Kyren Wilson (ENG)	John Higgins (SCO)	10–6	2025/26	Alexandra Palace, London
2027				2026/27	Alexandra Palace, London

== Finalists ==
Name	Nationality	Winner	Runner-up	Finals
**Ronnie O'Sullivan**	England	8	6	14
Stephen Hendry	Scotland	6	3	9
**Mark Selby**	England	3	2	5
Cliff Thorburn	Canada	3	1	4
Steve Davis	England	3	0	3
Paul Hunter	England	3	0	3
**John Higgins**	Scotland	2	4	6
Alex Higgins	Northern Ireland	2	3	5
**Neil Robertson**	Australia	2	2	4
**Mark Williams**	Wales	2	2	4
**Shaun Murphy**	England	2	1	3
**Judd Trump**	England	2	0	2
Ray Reardon	Wales	1	3	4
Terry Griffiths	Wales	1	3	4
**Kyren Wilson**	England	1	2	3
Doug Mountjoy	Wales	1	1	2
**Jimmy White**	England	1	1	2
**Ding Junhui**	China	1	1	2
John Spencer	England	1	0	1
Perrie Mans	South Africa	1	0	1
Dennis Taylor	Northern Ireland	1	0	1
Alan McManus	Scotland	1	0	1
**Matthew Stevens**	Wales	1	0	1
**Mark Allen**	Northern Ireland	1	0	1
**Stuart Bingham**	England	1	0	1
Yan Bingtao	China	1	0	1
John Parrott	England	0	3	3
Mike Hallett	England	0	2	2
Ken Doherty	Ireland	0	2	2
**Barry Hawkins**	England	0	2	2
**Ali Carter**	England	0	2	2
Graham Miles	England	0	1	1
James Wattana	Thailand	0	1	1
Fergal O'Brien	Ireland	0	1	1
Stephen Lee	England	0	1	1
**Marco Fu**	Hong Kong	0	1	1
Joe Perry	England	0	1	1

- Active players are shown in **bold**

== Wild-card round ==
For the 21 tournaments from 1990 to 2010 there was a wild-card round in which two additional players (three in 2007) played against the players seeded 15 and 16 (14, 15 and 16 in 2007) to reach the last-16 round. In most years one of the additional players was the winner of the Masters Qualifying Event while the other wild-card was selected. There were no qualifying events for the 1990 and 2005 Masters and both players were selected in those years. There were also two selections in 2007 when the wild-card round was extended to three matches.

The inclusion of wild-card players meant that there were an additional two or three matches to be arranged. The tournament continued to be played over 8 days but three matches were played on Sunday and Monday instead of the usual two (and Tuesday in 2007), so that the last-16 round was still completed on Wednesday. In 2007 all three wild-card matches were played on the first Sunday so that the last-16 round did not start until Monday.

There were a total of 43 wild-card matches. In 19 of these matches the seeded player played the winner of the Qualifying Event. In the remaining 24 matches the seed played a selected wild-card. The players selected as wild-card were Jimmy White (5), Ding Junhui (3), Steve Davis (2), Marco Fu (2), James Wattana (2), Ken Doherty, Peter Ebdon, Andy Hicks, Alex Higgins, John Higgins, Paul Hunter, Stephen Maguire, Ian McCulloch, Ricky Walden and Gary Wilkinson.

None of the players who played in the wild-card round won the tournament although two players, John Higgins (in 1995) and Ding Junhui (in 2007) reached the final. Both these players were wild-card selections. Two seeded players who played in the wild-card round reached the semi-final: Jimmy White (in 2004) and Mark Williams (in 2010). The winner of the Qualifying Event never got beyond the last-16 round.
