= 1990 Masters (snooker) =

Professional non-ranking snooker tournament, Feb 1990

1990 Benson & Hedges Masters
Tournament information
- Dates: 4–11 February 1990
- Venue: Wembley Conference Centre
- City: London
- Country: England
- Organisation: WPBSA
- Format: Non-ranking event
- Total prize fund: £275,000
- Winner's share: £70,000
- Highest break: Stephen Hendry (SCO) (111); Steve Davis (ENG) (111)

Final
- Champion: Stephen Hendry (SCO)
- Runner-up: John Parrott (ENG)
- Score: 9–4

The 1990 Masters (officially the 1990 Benson & Hedges Masters) was a professional non-ranking snooker tournament that took place between 4 and 11 February 1990 at the Wembley Conference Centre in London, England.

Wild-card players were introduced, and the two places went to Alex Higgins and the young new professional from Thailand, James Wattana. Wattana who won his match against Dean Reynolds and played the six-times world champion Steve Davis in the next round. Higgins meanwhile lost his match against Steve James, who had won the Classic in January. This was his last appearance in the Masters.

The final meanwhile had Stephen Hendry winning his second Masters title and becoming the second player after Cliff Thorburn to retain the title by defeating John Parrott 9–4 in the final. Hendry attempted a maximum break in the 12th frame before missing the 13th black. The highest break of the tournament was 111 made by both Stephen Hendry and Steve Davis, for which they both earned £3,500.

== Field ==
Defending champion Stephen Hendry was the number 1 seed with World Champion Steve Davis seeded 2. Places were allocated to the top 16 players in the world rankings. Players seeded 15 and 16 played in the wild-card round against the wild-card selections, Alex Higgins (ranked 24), and James Wattana. Steve James and James Wattana were making their debuts in the Masters.

== Wild-card round ==
Match	Date		Score	
WC1	Monday 5 February	Dean Reynolds (ENG) (15)	4–5	James Wattana (THA)
WC2	Sunday 4 February	Steve James (ENG) (16)	5–2	Alex Higgins (NIR)

== Main draw ==
Last 16; Best of 9 frames
1	Stephen Hendry (SCO)	5
16	Steve James (ENG)	2
8	Dennis Taylor (NIR)	4
9	Willie Thorne (ENG)	5
5	Terry Griffiths (WAL)	4
12	Tony Knowles (ENG)	5
4	Jimmy White (ENG)	5
13	John Virgo (ENG)	3
3	John Parrott (ENG)	5
14	Tony Meo (ENG)	3
6	Mike Hallett (ENG)	4
11	Joe Johnson (ENG)	5
7	Cliff Thorburn (CAN)	4
10	Doug Mountjoy (WAL)	5
2	Steve Davis (ENG)	5
James Wattana (THA)	2

Quarter-finals; Best of 9 frames
1	(Scotland) Stephen Hendry	5
9	(England) Willie Thorne	1
12	(England) Tony Knowles	3
4	(England) Jimmy White	5
3	(England) John Parrott	5
11	(England) Joe Johnson	3
10	(Wales) Doug Mountjoy	0
2	(England) Steve Davis	5

Semi-finals; Best of 11 frames
1	(Scotland) Stephen Hendry	6
4	(England) Jimmy White	4
3	(England) John Parrott	6
2	(England) Steve Davis	2

Final; Best of 17 frames
1	(Scotland) Stephen Hendry	9
3	(England) John Parrott	4

== Final ==
Final: Best of 17 frames. Referee: Alan Chamberlain; Wembley Conference Centre, London, England, 11 February 1990.
Stephen Hendry; Scotland	9–4	John Parrott; England
First session: 79–42 (69), 70–18, 84–23 (69), 40–90 (85), 63–64, 43–75 (68), 77–0, 81–30, 20–75, 65–30 (51), 68–38, 97–0 (97), 56–46
97	Highest break	85
0	Century breaks	0
4	50+ breaks	2

== Century breaks ==
Total: 3

- 111 – Stephen Hendry
- 111 – Steve Davis
- 103 – Jimmy White
