= 1988 Masters (snooker) =

Professional non-ranking snooker tournament, Jan 1988

1988 Benson & Hedges Masters
Tournament information
- Dates: 24–31 January 1988
- Venue: Wembley Conference Centre
- City: London
- Country: England
- Format: Non-ranking event
- Total prize fund: £225,000
- Winner's share: £56,000
- Highest break: Steve Davis (ENG) (126)

Final
- Champion: Steve Davis (ENG)
- Runner-up: Mike Hallett (ENG)
- Score: 9–0

The 1988 Masters (officially the 1988 Benson & Hedges Masters) was a professional snooker tournament that took place between 24 and 31 January 1988 at the Wembley Conference Centre in London, England. The fourteenth edition of the Masters, it was the second Triple Crown event of the 1987–88 snooker season. Sponsored by cigarette company Benson & Hedges, it had a total prize fund of £225,000 with £56,000 being awarded to the winner. The invitational event was contested by the 16 highest ranked players in the snooker world rankings.

Dennis Taylor was the defending champion, having won the 1987 Masters, following a 9‍–‍8 victory over Alex Higgins. Taylor lost in the first round against Mike Hallett, who was making his debut. Steve Davis won his second Masters title by defeating Hallett 9 frames to 0. As of 2026, this is the only time a whitewash has occurred in a Masters final. Davis made the highest break of the tournament, a 126 in the second frame of the final which was one of two century breaks.

== Overview ==
The Masters is an invitational snooker tournament that was first held in 1975; the 1988 competition saw the top-16 players from the snooker world rankings compete. It is one of the three Triple Crown events in the game of snooker, the others being the World Snooker Championship and the UK Championship, but it is not an official ranking tournament. The 1988 Masters was its 14th staging. It occurred from 24 to 31 January 1988, at the Wembley Conference Centre, London.

The Masters was sponsored by cigarette company Benson & Hedges and organised by the World Professional Billiards and Snooker Association. The last 16 and quarter-final stages were best of nine frame matches, the semi-finals best of 11 and the final a best of 17 frames played over two sessions.

=== Field ===
Defending champion Dennis Taylor was the number 1 seed with World Champion Steve Davis seeded 2. The remaining places were allocated to players based on the world rankings. Mike Hallett and John Parrott were making their debuts in the Masters.

=== Prize fund ===
The breakdown of prize money for the event is shown below:

- Winner: £56,000
- Runner-up: £32,000
- Semi-final: £18,000
- Quarter-final: £12,000
- Last 16: £6,000
- Highest break: £5,000
- Total: £225,000

== Main draw ==
Last 16; Best of 9 frames
1	Dennis Taylor (NIR)	3
16	Mike Hallett (ENG)	5
8	Tony Knowles (ENG)	4
9	Alex Higgins (NIR)	5
5	Cliff Thorburn (CAN)	5
12	Rex Williams (ENG)	3
4	Neal Foulds (ENG)	4
13	John Parrott (ENG)	5
3	Jimmy White (ENG)	5
14	Doug Mountjoy (WAL)	0
6	Joe Johnson (ENG)	5
11	Willie Thorne (ENG)	4
7	Terry Griffiths (WAL)	5
10	Silvino Francisco (RSA)	3
2	Steve Davis (ENG)	5
15	Dean Reynolds (ENG)	2

Quarter-finals; Best of 9 frames
16	(England) Mike Hallett	5
9	(Northern Ireland) Alex Higgins	2
5	(Canada) Cliff Thorburn	4
13	(England) John Parrott	5
3	(England) Jimmy White	3
6	(England) Joe Johnson	5
7	(Wales) Terry Griffiths	0
2	(England) Steve Davis	5

Semi-finals; Best of 11 frames
16	(England) Mike Hallett	6
13	(England) John Parrott	5
6	(England) Joe Johnson	3
2	(England) Steve Davis	6

Final; Best of 17 frames
16	(England) Mike Hallett	0
2	(England) Steve Davis	9

=== Final ===
Final: Best of 17 frames. Referee: John Street; Wembley Conference Centre, London, England, 31 January 1988.
Steve Davis; England	9–0	Mike Hallett; England
First session: 68–55 (61), 130–0 (126), 87–25, 75–20, 99–28 (72), 98–27, 70–33 (53), 59–46
126	Highest break	
1	Century breaks	0
4	50+ breaks	0

== Century breaks ==
Two century breaks were made during the tournament:

- 126 – Steve Davis
- 105 – John Parrott
