= Dafabet =

Online gambling company

- Available in: Multilingual
- Founded: 2004; 22 years ago
- Headquarters: Makati, Philippines
- Area served: Asia Pacific region / Europe
- Industry: Online gambling
- Services: Online betting and gambling
- Employees: 1000+
- Website: Official website

Dafabet is an online betting and gambling site operated by AsianBGE. The company was founded in November 2004 and is headquartered in Makati, Philippines.

== History ==
Dafabet was founded in November 2004 under AsianBGE, a privately owned company licensed by the Cagayan Economic Zone Authority (CEZA) and regulated by First Cagayan Leisure and Resorts (FCLRC). It first operated in Asia and later entered the European market. The company holds a remote British licence through AsianBGE (Isle of Man) Limited, regulated by the Gambling Commission, and is also licensed in Malta.

== Services ==
Dafabet offers in-play betting on sports including the FIFA World Cup, Premier League, National Basketball Association, US Open and Ultimate Fighting Championship. Its casino, poker and slots games run on software supplied by Playtech.

== Reception ==
eGaming Review ranked Dafabet among its annual top 50 e-gaming operators, placing it 21st in 2013, 19th in 2014 and 23rd in 2015.

== Sponsorships ==
Dafabet's brand ambassadors have included footballers Alan Shearer and Steve McManaman, and snooker player Jimmy White.

Among British football clubs, Dafabet has sponsored Everton and West Bromwich Albion (2012–2013), Aston Villa F.C. (2013–2015), Celtic (from 2016), Burnley (2016–2017), Blackburn Rovers (2016–2018), Sunderland (until 2017–2018), Fulham (2018–2020), Norwich City (from 2019–2020) and AFC Bournemouth (from 2022–2023). On several of these deals the brand appeared on the front of the shirt.

In snooker, Dafabet sponsored the Players Tour Championship 2012/2013 – Finals, the 2014 World Snooker Championship and the Masters from 2014 to 2020. In 2015 it became the lead sponsor of the eSports team Fnatic.

In cricket, Dafabet sponsored the English counties Durham and Sussex in 2020, and in 2024 became official Team Associate Sponsor of Cricket South Africa's national teams under a three-year deal. It also sponsored La Liga club Cádiz CF in 2020. Dafabet is a sponsor of the Zimbabwe cricket team.

In July 2024, Dafabet became Brazilian club Guarani's main shirt sponsor, its first South American deal, but withdrew from Brazil three months later after failing to gain authorisation under the country's regulated betting regime.

== Regulation and criticism ==
Dafabet's sponsorships have drawn scrutiny in markets where the operator is not locally licensed. Before Cricket South Africa's 2024 partnership was announced, a News24 investigation questioned why an unlicensed operator was sponsoring the national teams. The governing body subsequently defended the arrangement by stating that South African residents cannot legally access the Dafabet platform, which is not licensed in the country. A similar pattern occurred in Australia, where Dafabet sponsored Northern Territory Cricket's 2023 Top End T20 Series despite being unlicensed there; regulator ACMA was later criticised for coordinating its public response with NT Cricket instead of pursuing enforcement. Elsewhere, an investigation found that "Dafanews", linked to Dafabet, sponsored Indian Super League clubs Punjab FC and Mumbai City FC while presenting itself as a news service to circumvent local betting-advertising restrictions. In June 2026, Indian police arrested 11 people in Telangana over a multi-state network allegedly promoting Dafabet's platform, uncovering 46 mule bank accounts, shell companies and technical-support operations linked to complaints in several states.

More broadly, betting brands such as Dafabet have featured in academic and policy debate over gambling marketing in sport. Studies of English football have documented how a single logo on a shirt front is repeatedly reproduced through televised coverage and through merchandise marketed to children, contributing to high levels of incidental exposure. The prevalence of such sponsorship has been examined as an ethical question for British football. In 2023, Premier League clubs voluntarily agreed to remove gambling sponsors from the front of matchday shirts from the 2025–26 season onward, a change taking effect for the 2026–27 season.
