= John Street (snooker referee) =

English snooker referee (1932–2009)

- John Street
- Born: 3 January 1932; Exmouth, England
- Died: 6 January 2009 (aged 77); Exeter, England
- Occupation: Snooker referee
- Years active: 1960–1997 (as a referee)

John Street (3 January 1932 – 6 January 2009) was an English professional snooker referee. He refereed 12 Masters finals, and five World Championship finals between 1980 and 1995.

He was born in Exmouth, Devon, and was evacuated to Bishop Auckland for four years during World War II. When he was 17 in 1950 he contracted tuberculosis and was hospitalised for 14 months. Unable to continue playing table tennis after this, he took up snooker. He started refereeing matches in 1960. He started working for the Pearl Assurance company in 1968, and was an insurance agent until leaving the role to focus on refereeing professionally in 1986. He was appointed by the World Professional Billiards and Snooker Association as their Referee Assessor/Coach in 1995. His final match was at the 1997 Benson & Hedges Masters final when Steve Davis defeated Ronnie O'Sullivan 10–8 after trailing 4–8. The match was interrupted by a woman streaking.

Street married Jean in 1953 and had three daughters. In 1998 he co-authored The Billiards and Snooker Referees' Handbook with Peter Rook. He died from lung disease at Whipton Hospital in Exeter on 6 January 2009, aged 77.

== Early life ==
John Street was born in Exmouth, Devon on 3 January 1932, the son of Gordon and Ivy. During World War II he was evacuated to Bishop Auckland for four years. When he was 17 in 1950 he contracted tuberculosis and was hospitalised for 14 months. Street had competed at the 1949 English Table tennis Championship, but as the effects of his illness impacted his ability to participate in that sport, he took up snooker at Archie Oliver's snooker hall in Waterbeer Street, Exeter. He worked as an apprentice engineer, then as a salesperson at a tailor before returning to engineering and then working for a bookmaker.

== Career ==
Street started refereeing matches in 1960, gained his "C" grade refereeing certificate that year followed by "B" grade the next year, and his "A" grade certificate in 1968. He was a council member of the Billiards Association and Control Council and recalled suggesting that "snooker" should be included in the Association's title; it later became the Billiards and Snooker Control Council. His first professional refereeing role was at the 1974 World Snooker Championship and his first televised match was during the 1978 Masters. In 1977 he became the first secretary and treasurer of the newly created Professional Billiards and Snooker Referees Association. His first major final as a referee was at the 1978 Masters, when Alex Higgins defeated Cliff Thorburn. In 1979 he refereed a significant final for the first time; the English Amateur Championship final between Jimmy White and Dave Martin. At the match he used a ball marker, later writing that "It caused quite a stir at the time because in those days no-one had ever seen a ball marker and all the referees used coins when they removed a ball from the table."

Street started working for the Pearl Assurance company in 1968, and was an insurance agent until leaving the role to focus on refereeing professionally in 1986. Street refereed in five World Championship finals between 1980 and 1995. He handled the 1992 final between White and Stephen Hendry when Hendry came from 8–14 behind to win the match 18–14 by winning 10 consecutive frames.

During the qualifying competition for the 1987 British Open, Higgins threatened Street while holding his neck, an incident that snooker historian Clive Everton wrote was "glossed over". In 1992, Higgins was fined £500 by the World Professional Billiards and Snooker Association (WPBSA) for "failing to accord [Street] appropriate dignity and respect" at the 1991 UK Championship. After Higgins's defeat at the 1994 UK Championship by Dave Harold in a match refereed by Street, Higgins called him "incompetent", claimed that he needed an eye test and said that he would rather have a "man off the street" refereeing. Street later commented that he wished Higgins has "concentrated on his wonderful snooker talent more and kept his temper in check. I know some referees were frightened of him, but I always stood my ground, as did John Williams, which probably worked against us at times."

He reduced the number of matches that he refereed from 1995 because he was appointed by the WPBSA as their Referee Assessor/Coach. His final match was at the 1997 Benson & Hedges Masters final when Steve Davis defeated Ronnie O'Sullivan 10–8 after trailing 4–8. This match was interrupted by a woman streaking. In all, Street refereed 12 Masters finals; the World Snooker Tour website called him "the leading referee in the early years of the Masters".

Street wrote and self-published The Billiards and Snooker Referees' Handbook: An In-depth Guide to the History, Rules of the Games and the Art of Refereeing (1998) with Peter Rook. In an interview for Jack Karnehm's book World Snooker (1981), Street replied that a good referee, "You must want to be a referee rather than a player, spectator or anything else. It's a disease really, an obsession. Get a bunch of referees together and all they do is debate the rules for hours." He added that "you must be in control yet be unobtrusive."

== Personal life, illness and death ==
Street married Jean in 1953, after meeting her at a local dance event and they went on to have three daughters. By June 2008, he required sticks to help him walk. He died from lung disease at Whipton Hospital in Exeter on 6 January 2009, aged 77. His funeral was held on 20 January 2009 at St Thomas Methodist Church. In 1987, Steve Acteson, snooker correspondent for The Times, referred to Street as "one of snooker's most respected referees". Journalist David Hendon, deputy editor of Snooker Scene magazine, wrote in 2009 that "Everyone respected him. He was one of snooker's top officials and a famous face himself in the game's boom years."
