= 2024 Masters (snooker) =

2024 MrQ Masters

Tournament information
- Dates: 7–14 January 2024
- Venue: Alexandra Palace
- City: London
- Country: England
- Organisation: World Snooker Tour
- Format: Non-ranking event
- Total prize fund: £725,000
- Winner's share: £250,000
- Highest break: Ding Junhui (CHN) (147); Mark Allen (NIR) (147)

Final
- Champion: Ronnie O'Sullivan (ENG)
- Runner-up: Ali Carter (ENG)
- Score: 10‍–‍7

The 2024 Masters (officially the 2024 MrQ Masters) was a professional non-ranking snooker tournament that took place from 7 to 14 January 2024 at Alexandra Palace in London, England. The second Triple Crown event of the 2023‍–‍24 season, following the 2023 UK Championship and preceding the 2024 World Championship, the tournament was the 50th edition of the Masters, which was first held in 1975. Organised by the World Snooker Tour and sponsored by online casino MrQ, the tournament was broadcast by the BBC, Eurosport, and Discovery+ domestically, and by multiple other broadcasters internationally. The winner received £250,000 from a total prize pool of £725,000.

The top 16 players in the snooker world rankings, as they stood after the UK Championship, were invited to the event. Judd Trump was the defending champion, having defeated Mark Williams 10‍–‍8 in the 2023 final, but he lost 5‍–‍6 to Ali Carter in the quarter-finals. Ronnie O'Sullivan defeated Carter 10‍–‍7 in the final having trailed 3–6 and 6–7 to win a record-extending 8th Masters title and 23rd Triple Crown title. He became the oldest Masters winner, aged 48 years and 40 days, surpassing Stuart Bingham, who was 43 years and 243 days old when he won the 2020 event. O'Sullivan already held the record as the tournament's youngest winner—set 29 years earlier at the 1995 event—which gave him the distinction of simultaneously becoming the youngest and oldest Masters champion.

The tournament produced 27 century breaks, including two maximum breaks. Ding Junhui made the first maximum in his first-round match against O'Sullivan, and Mark Allen made the second in his quarter-final match against Mark Selby. These were respectively the fourth and fifth maximum breaks in the tournament's history. In his quarter-final match against Allen, Carter became the first player to make three consecutive century breaks at the Masters. Carter made a record nine centuries in the tournament, surpassing the previous record of eight set by O'Sullivan at the 2007 and 2009 events.

== Overview ==
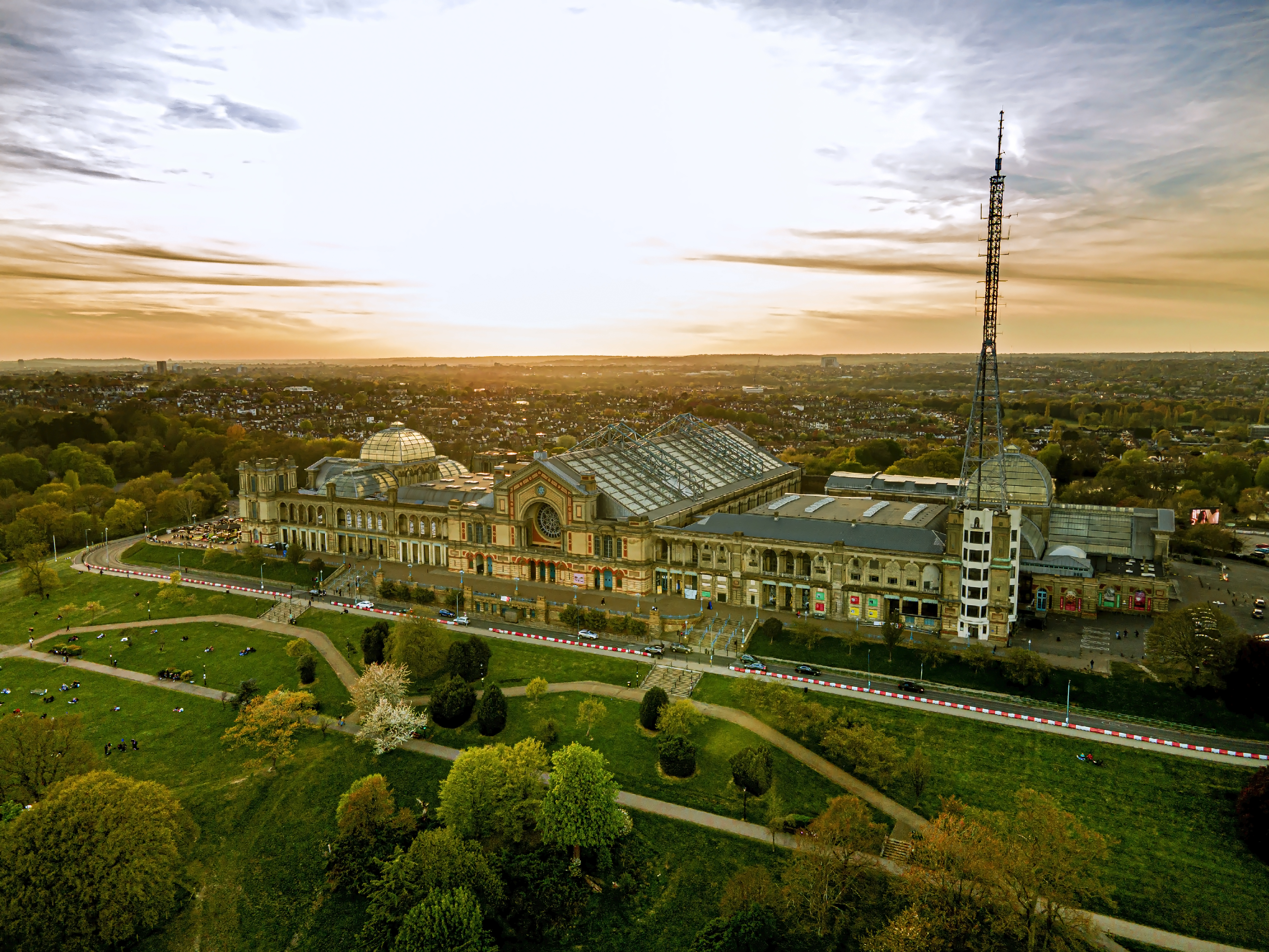
The event was held at Alexandra Palace (pictured) in London.

The 2024 Masters was a professional non-ranking snooker tournament that took place from 7 to 14 January 2024 at Alexandra Palace in London, England. The second Triple Crown event of the 2023‍–‍24 season, the tournament was the 50th edition of the Masters, which was first held in 1975 for 10 invited players at the West Centre Hotel in London. John Spencer won the inaugural event, defeating Ray Reardon on a re-spotted black in the deciding frame of the final. The Masters is the second-longest-running professional snooker tournament after the World Snooker Championship, and has been staged at Alexandra Palace since 2012. (Note: The 2021 event moved to the Marshall Arena in Milton Keynes, England, due to the COVID-19 pandemic.) The most successful player in its history has been Ronnie O'Sullivan, who had previously won the title seven times, most recently in 2017.

The 16 highest ranked players in the snooker world rankings after the 2023 UK Championship were invited to participate in the single-elimination tournament. The defending champion was English player Judd Trump, who won his second Masters title at the previous year's event by defeating his Welsh opponent Mark Williams 10‍–‍8 in the final. As defending champion, Trump was the first seed, while Luca Brecel was seeded second as the reigning World Champion. The next six players in the world rankings were seeded third to eighth, allocated fixed positions in the draw, and drawn randomly against the remaining eight participants. The first-round draw was made during the UK Championship final. Matches were played as the best of 11 frames until the final, which was played as the best of 19 frames held over two sessions.

=== Participants ===
The event featured the top 16 players in the world rankings, as they stood after the UK Championship. Zhang Anda, who entered the top 16 for the first time after winning his maiden ranking title at the 2023 International Championship, was the only Masters debutant. After failing to qualify for the previous two Masters tournaments, Ding Junhui qualified for the 2024 event when he regained his place in the top 16 by reaching the UK Championship final. Hossein Vafaei, who made his Masters debut the previous year, was ranked 17th after losing to O'Sullivan in the UK Championship semi-finals and did not qualify for the 2024 event.

=== Broadcasters ===
The tournament was broadcast in the United Kingdom by BBC Sport and in Europe (including the UK and Ireland) by Eurosport and Discovery+. It was broadcast in China by China Central Television and streamed by Huya and Migu. It was broadcast in Hong Kong by Now TV, in Brazil and the United States by DAZN, in Pakistan by Fastsports, in Malaysia and Brunei by Astro SuperSport, in Taiwan by Sport Cast, in Thailand by TrueVisions, and in the Philippines by Premier Sports. In all other territories, the event was streamed by Matchroom Sport.

=== Prize money ===
The winner of the event received £250,000 from a total prize pool of £725,000. The breakdown of prize money for the event is shown below:

- Winner: £250,000
- Runner-up: £100,000
- Semi-finals: £60,000
- Quarter-finals: £30,000
- Last 16: £15,000
- Highest break: £15,000 (Note: In addition to the highest break prize, any player making two maximum breaks during this season's Triple Crown events would have been rewarded with a £147,000 bonus.)
- Total: £725,000

== Summary ==
=== First round ===
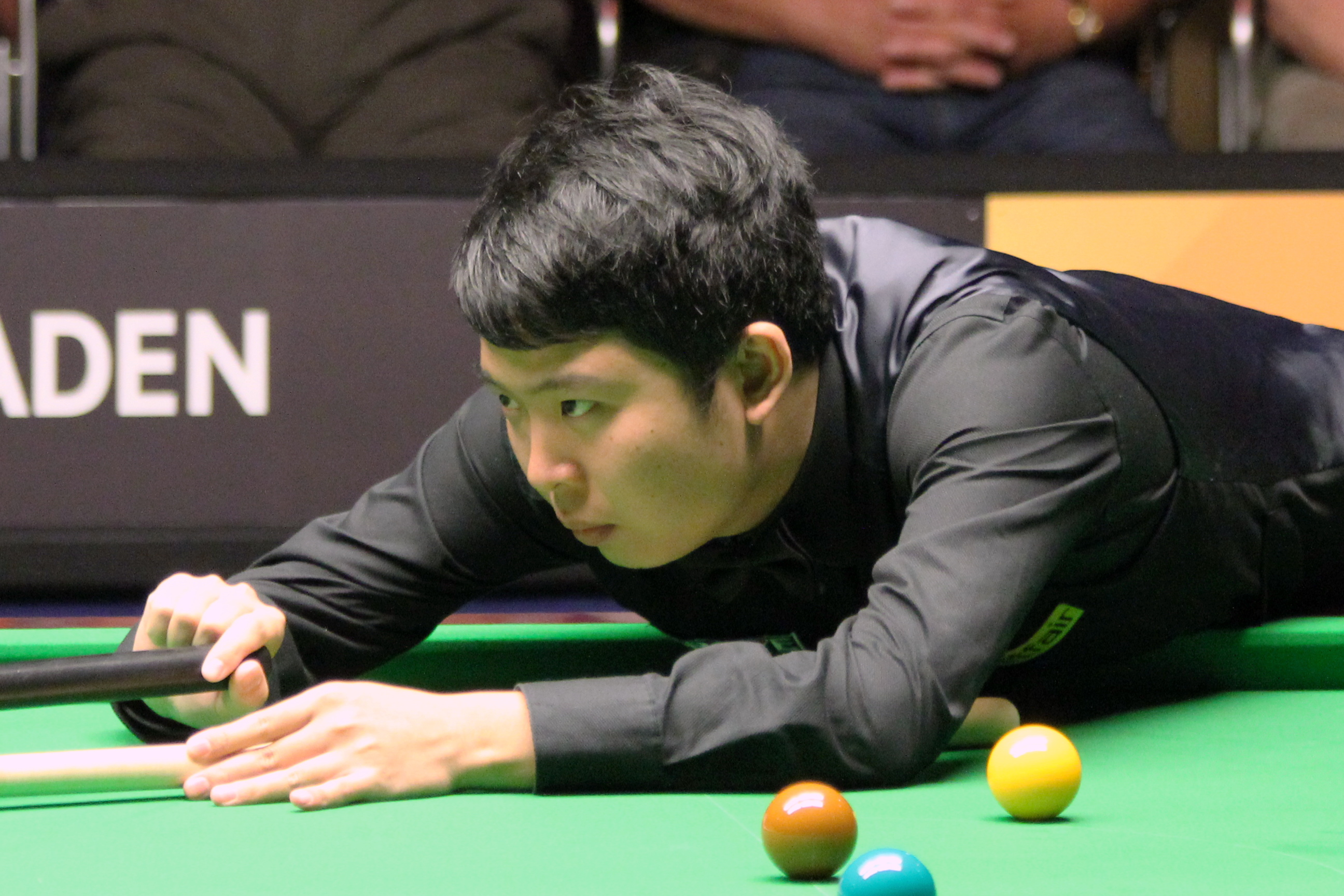
Zhang Anda (pictured in 2012) was the only debutant at the event. He lost 2‍–‍6 to Shaun Murphy in the first round.

The first-round matches were played from 7 to 10 January as the best of 11 frames. Luca Brecel, the reigning World Champion, faced 2023 semi-finalist Jack Lisowski, who moved into a 4‍–‍0 lead at the mid-session interval with breaks of 70, 100, 96, and 69. Although Brecel reduced Lisowski's lead to 4‍–‍2 with breaks of 80 and 72, Lisowski produced breaks of 63 and 68 to secure a 6‍–‍2 win. Lisowski's 100 break in the second frame was his 300th century break in professional competition. Having recently reached the final of an exhibition event in Macau, Lisowski commented: "I think I found something in China because I was really struggling [this season] and I was really scared coming here because I did not know which Jack was going to turn up." Brecel expressed frustration with his form, saying: "It was terrible. If I keep playing like this then you will see me in 2025 Q School."

Shaun Murphy, the 2015 champion, played Masters debutant Zhang Anda. The match was level at 1‍–‍1, but Murphy capitalised on Zhang's positional errors in the third and fourth frames to take on a 3‍–‍1 lead at the mid-session interval. Murphy also took the fifth frame with a break of 86. Zhang closed to 2‍–‍4 with a 69 break, but Murphy made breaks of 71 and 89 to win the last two frames for a 6‍–‍2 victory. Murphy commented that Zhang had "been one of the best players of all season" and that if he had played badly, "he would have turned me over. With that in mind I've worked very hard in the background." In defeat, Zhang commented "Shaun played better than me tonight. I missed some very simple shots and he took his chances to win the game."

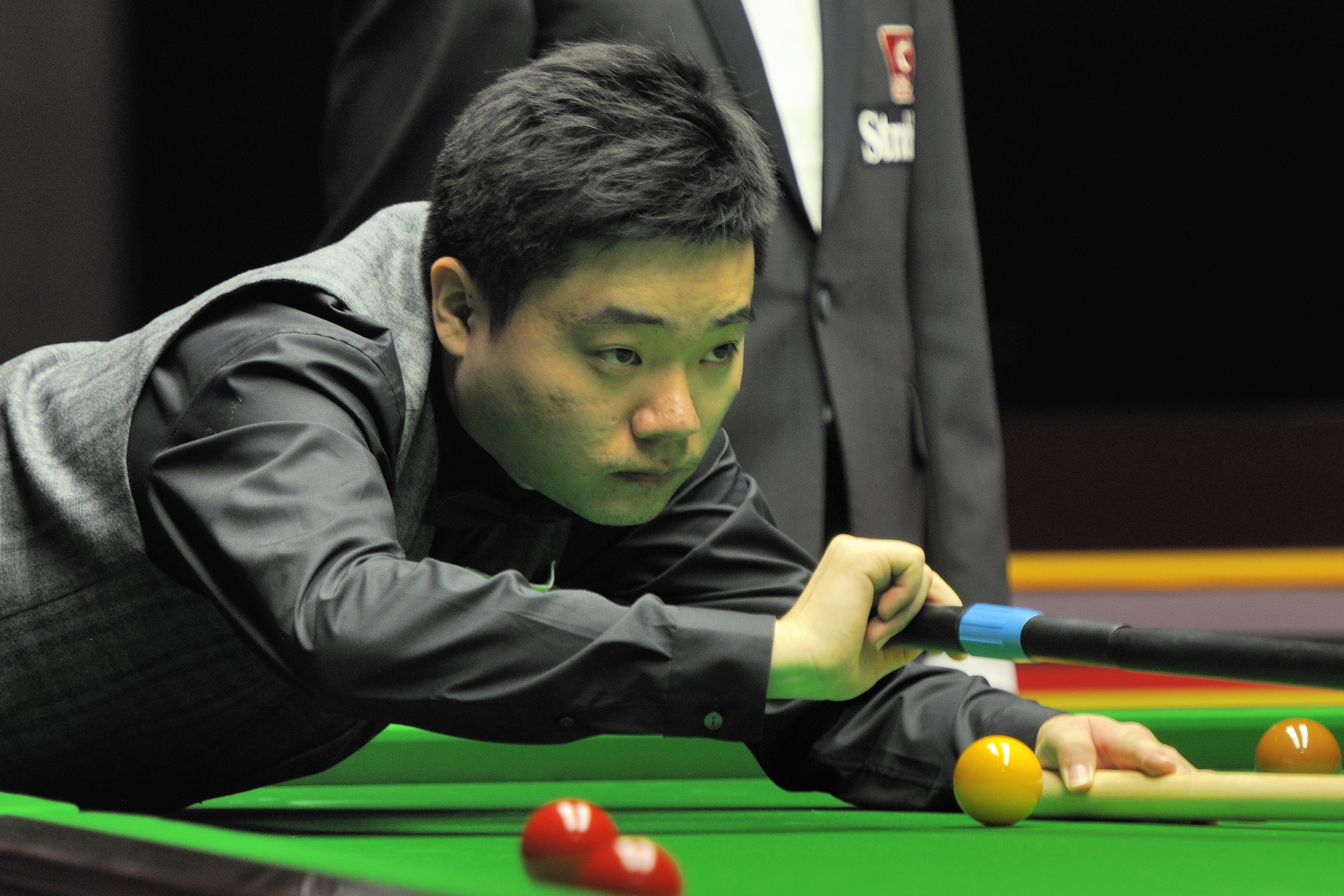
Ding Junhui (pictured in 2014) made the seventh maximum break of his career in the first round, before losing 3‍–‍6 to Ronnie O'Sullivan.

Ronnie O'Sullivan, a seven-time winner, faced the 2011 champion Ding Junhui. The players had met at the 2023 UK Championship final, where O'Sullivan defeated Ding 10‍‍–‍7 to capture his eighth UK title. O'Sullivan took a 4‍–‍0 lead, making breaks of 67, 87, and 106. After the mid-session interval, Ding responded with breaks of 61 and 92, followed by a maximum break of 147, to narrow O'Sullivan's lead to 4‍–‍3. It was the fourth maximum in the tournament's history, the seventh maximum of Ding's professional career, and the second time Ding had made a maximum at the Masters, having previously done so at the 2007 event. However, O'Sullivan then made breaks of 127 and 93 to secure a 6‍–‍3 victory. Afterwards, O'Sullivan called Ding's maximum break "unbelievable" and called his opponent a "magnificent player" and a "delight to watch." Ding said: "To make a maximum was amazing, it has been a long time since I felt like that."

Mark Williams, a two-time winner, played 2020 finalist Ali Carter. The score was level at 2‍–‍2 at the mid-session interval. Williams made a 93 break in frame 5 to lead 3‍–‍2, but Carter produced back-to-back century breaks of 118 and 133 to take a 4‍–‍3 lead. Williams tied the scores at 4‍–‍4 with an 86 break, but Carter took the last two frames with breaks of 61 and 73 to secure a 6‍–‍4 victory. Carter said after the match: "All parts of my game were good. I potted a lot of tricky balls tonight and that was pleasing."

Defending champion Judd Trump faced 2018 finalist Kyren Wilson. Kyren established a 3‍–‍0 lead as he made breaks of 65 and 76. Trump then won five frames in a row to lead 5‍–‍3. However, Wilson won the next two frames to level the score to 5‍–‍5 and force a deciding frame. Wilson made a break of 51 in the deciding frame, before running out of position and missing a pot on a tricky red ball. This allowed Trump to pot the same red and make a clearance of 65 to win the frame on the last black ball for a 6‍–‍5 victory. Trump commented: "I felt nervy from the start and my cue ball control wasn't good. Under pressure in the clearance at the end, I shortened my backswing, it was more of a 'stab' but that helped with my position."

Neil Robertson, another two-time winner, played two-time runner-up Barry Hawkins. The players had contested the 2022 final, with Robertson winning 10‍–‍4. The score was level at 1‍–‍1 after two closely contested frames that lasted over an hour. Hawkins won three frames in a row to lead 4‍–‍1, but Robertson made back-to-back centuries of 117 and 110 to narrow Hawkins's lead to 4‍–‍3. Hawkins then took the eighth and ninth frames with breaks of 69 and 57 to win the match 6‍–‍3. He said after the match: "It didn't come easily tonight and everything was a bit of a struggle. I tried my hardest and that is all you can do out there really."

Mark Allen, who had suffered five consecutive first-round defeats at the Masters since winning the 2018 event, faced two-time champion John Higgins. Higgins made breaks of 83 and 80 to lead 3‍–‍1 at the mid-session interval, but Allen won 4 frames in a row to lead 5‍–‍3, making a century break of 123 in the eighth frame. Higgins won frames 9 and 10 with 58 and 61 breaks to level the score at 5‍–‍5 to force a decider, which Allen took with a break of 86 to secure a 6‍–‍5 victory. Allen commented: "I was edgy all day but then 5‍–‍5 was the calmest I felt. This was a big hurdle for me to get over, having lost all of my first round games since I won it. The positive I can take from today is how good I felt in the last frame."

Mark Selby, a three-time winner, played Robert Milkins, who made his third Masters appearance and his first in nine years. Milkins had never won a match at the Masters, having lost in the first round to O'Sullivan in 2014 and Robertson in 2015. Selby produced breaks of 119, 53, and 63 to lead 4‍–‍0 at the mid-session interval. Milkins narrowed the score to 4‍–‍1 with an 88 break in the fifth frame, but Selby won the next two frames with breaks of 70 and 74 for a 6‍–‍1 victory. Selby said after the match: "[Milkins] had a good chance in the first frame after I missed an easy black. If he wins the frame there he settles and it is a totally different game. Thankfully he missed, I settled first and managed to kick on from then."

=== Quarter-finals ===
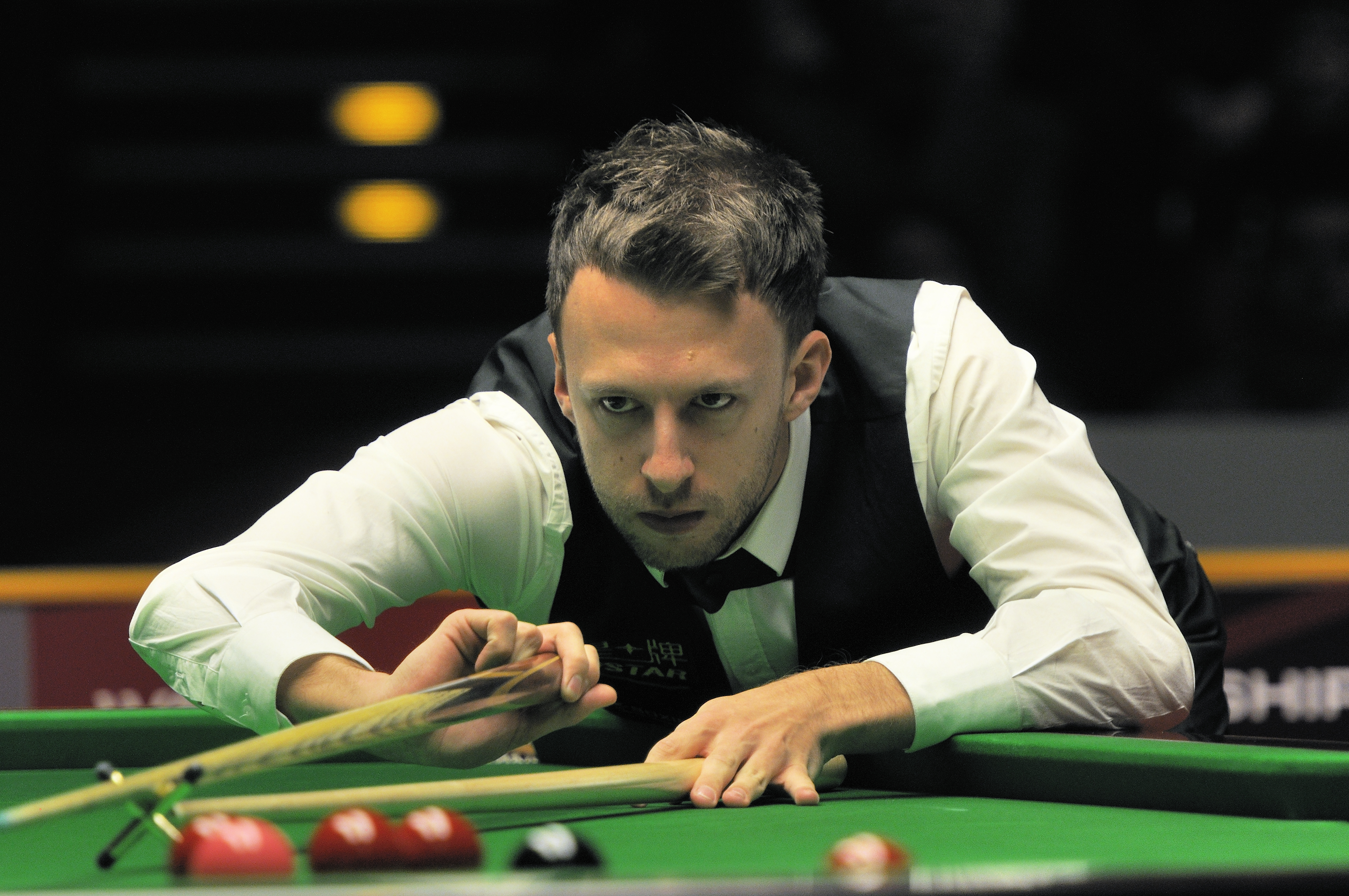
Defending champion Judd Trump (pictured in 2014) lost 5‍–‍6 to Ali Carter in the quarter-finals.

The quarter-finals were played from 11 to 12 January as the best of 11 frames. In the first quarter-final, O'Sullivan faced Hawkins. The players had previously contested the 2016 final, which O'Sullivan won 10‍–‍1. O'Sullivan opened the match with a break of 88, but Hawkins led 3‍–‍2, having made breaks of 74 and 56 in the fourth and fifth frames. Despite missed pots by both players, O'Sullivan won three of the next four frames to lead 5‍–‍3. In the ninth frame, Hawkins missed a pot while on a break of 50, and O'Sullivan made a 77 clearance to win the match 6‍–‍3. After the match, O'Sullivan apologised to Hawkins for his poor performance, saying: "I felt bad for [Hawkins]. I just dragged him down to my level. That's the most awful standard of snooker." Hawkins commented: "[O'Sullivan] was there for the taking. I had plenty of chances but I didn't take them. It's frustrating but I didn't deserve to win."

Murphy played Lisowski in the second quarter-final. Murphy won the first frame with a 75 break and Lisowski took the second with a 74. Murphy won the next four frames, making breaks of 131, 76, and 123, to lead 5‍–‍1. Lisowski took the seventh and eighth frames to narrow the score to 5‍–‍3, but Murphy won the ninth frame on the last black to complete a 6‍–‍3 victory. "You just never feel safe against [Lisowski] because he's a huge talent," Murphy said afterwards. Lisowski commented: "I didn't feel great, but I just kept clinging on. [Murphy] finished strongly."

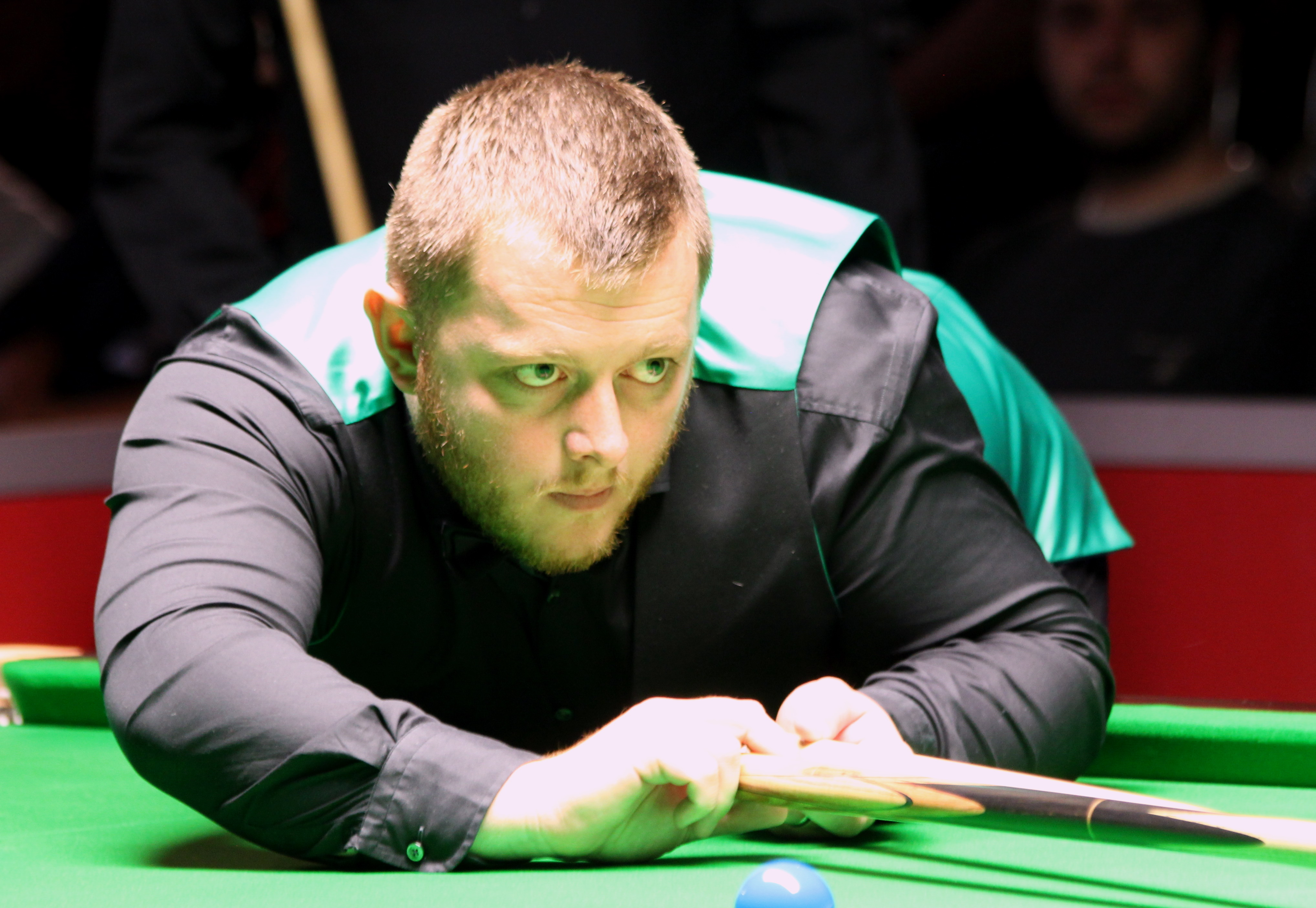
Mark Allen (pictured in 2016) made the second maximum break of the tournament, and the third of his professional career, during his 6‍–‍5 quarter-final win over Mark Selby.

The third quarter-final was played between Trump and Carter. The scores were level at 2‍–‍2 at the mid-session interval, Carter having made breaks of 85 and 103 in the first and third frames and Trump an 80 in the second. Carter won two consecutive frames with breaks of 71 and 64 to lead 4‍–‍2, but Trump made a century break of 129 in the 7th frame, despite a wasp being attached to his waistcoat throughout, and also won the eighth and ninth frames to lead 5‍–‍4. However, Carter won the tenth frame with a 43 clearance and made a 64 break in the decider to secure a 6‍–‍5 victory. Carter commented that he "lost [his] composure for a couple of frames" but was "delighted to make an unbelievable clearance to force a decider." Trump said that "[Carter] played well and I struggled." He added that he was "disappointed" but that Carter "deserved to win."

Allen and Selby contested the last quarter-final. Selby won the first two frames, but Allen made a maximum break in the third frame, after running out of position multiple times and making difficult recovery pots. Selby made a break of 82 in the fourth frame and took the fifth frame to move 4‍–‍1 ahead, but Allen won four frames in a row, making breaks of 56 and 103 in the sixth and seventh frames, to lead 5‍–‍4. Selby won the 10th frame to force a decider, which Allen took to secure a 6‍–‍5 victory. The match finished at 00:15 GMT on 13 January. The maximum break in frame three was the third of Allen's professional career, the fifth in the tournament's history, and the second made in that year's event, following the maximum by Ding in the first round. Allen became the first player from the UK or Ireland to make a maximum break in the 50-year history of the tournament, as the previous four maximums at the Masters had all been made by overseas players—Canada's Kirk Stevens in 1984, China's Ding in 2007 and 2024, and Hong Kong's Marco Fu in 2015. Commenting on his maximum break, Allen said: "To do it here at the Masters was very special. It wasn't the best cue ball [control] in the world but it made it more exciting for the crowd and a bit more nerve-racking for me, but I'm glad I've finally done it for the fans."

=== Semi-finals ===
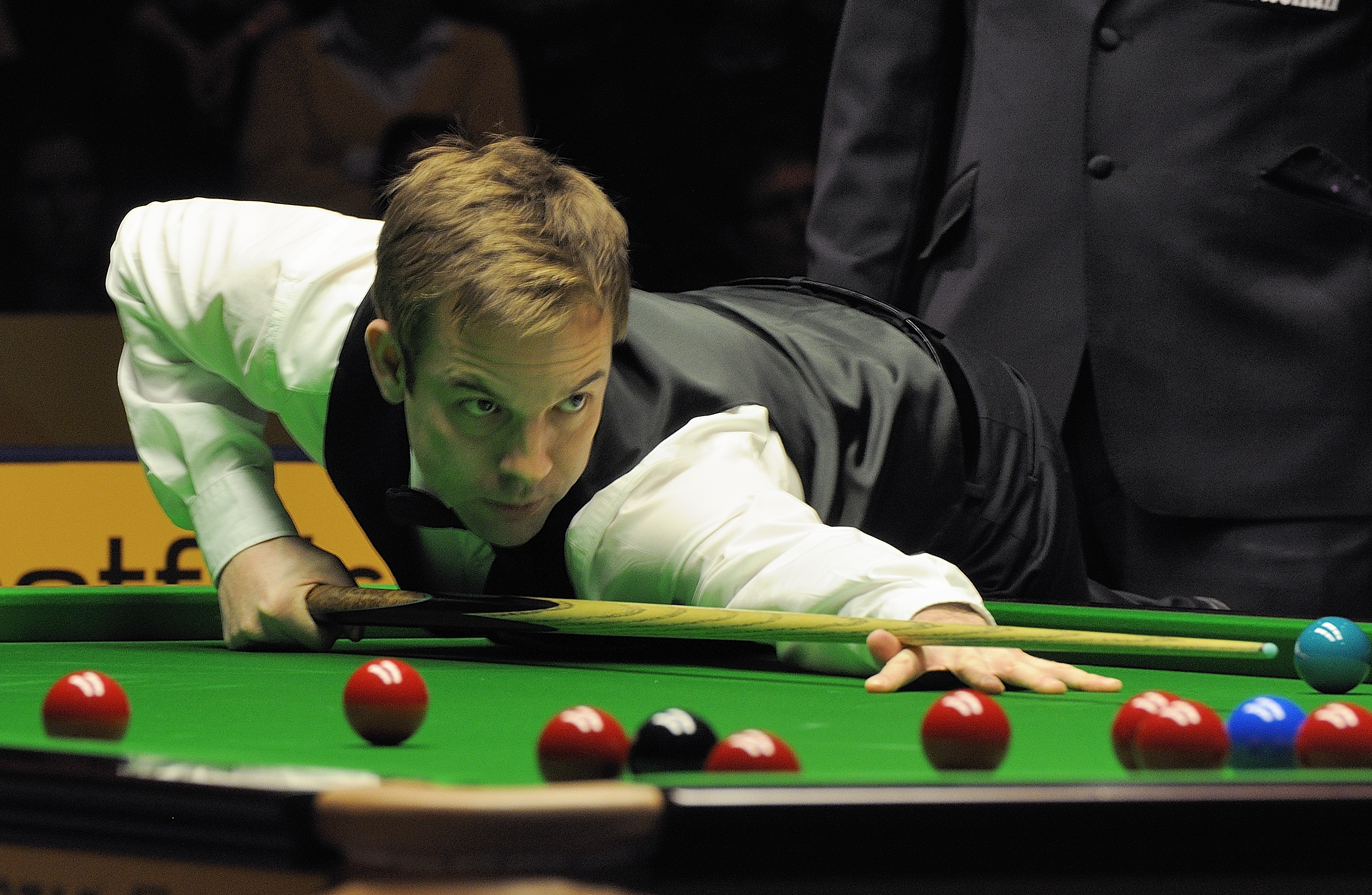
Tournament runner-up Ali Carter (pictured in 2013) became the first player to make three consecutive century breaks at the Masters. He also set a new Masters record of nine century breaks in a single event.

The semi-finals were played on 13 January as the best of 11 frames. O'Sullivan played Murphy, the first time the players had faced each other at the Masters. O'Sullivan won the first two frames, but Murphy won the third with a century break of 131. O'Sullivan took the fourth frame after a safety battle to lead 3‍–‍1 at the mid-session interval. Murphy narrowed the score to 3‍–‍2 with another century break of 100, but O'Sullivan made breaks of 90, 71, and 62 to win three frames in a row and capture a 6‍–‍2 victory. It was O'Sullivan's 14th win in 15 semi-final appearances. He commented afterwards: "At the start there were a few mistakes but I cleaned it up a little bit—and I need to do that these days, because I can't pot as well as these guys but I can make breaks among the balls and make up for it that way." Murphy said: "He was just too good—simple as that. If he plays like that, you may as well give him the trophy now." Murphy, who received criticism for participating in the BBC commentary team for the previous night's quarter-final between Allen and Selby, insisted that the late finish of that match had not affected his semi-final performance, saying: "If I thought [commentating] was detrimental to my life I wouldn't be doing it."

Carter played Allen in the other semi-final. Allen won the first frame after a safety exchange, but Carter made breaks of 71, 100, 101, and 105 to win four frames in a row and lead 4‍–‍1. In doing so, Carter became the first player to compile three consecutive century breaks at the Masters. Allen responded with a century in the sixth frame and also won the seventh to close the score to 4‍–‍3. However, Carter took the next two frames, after a 42-minute ninth frame, which was halted briefly for a medical emergency in the crowd, to secure a 6‍–‍3 victory. Carter commented: "I really got it going in the middle there and felt really good and [Allen] showed what a great player he is with a good [century break]." Allen said: "I just came up against an opponent that played well. I got myself back into the game at 4‍–‍3 but I couldn't kick on from there. Well done to [Carter]."

=== Final ===
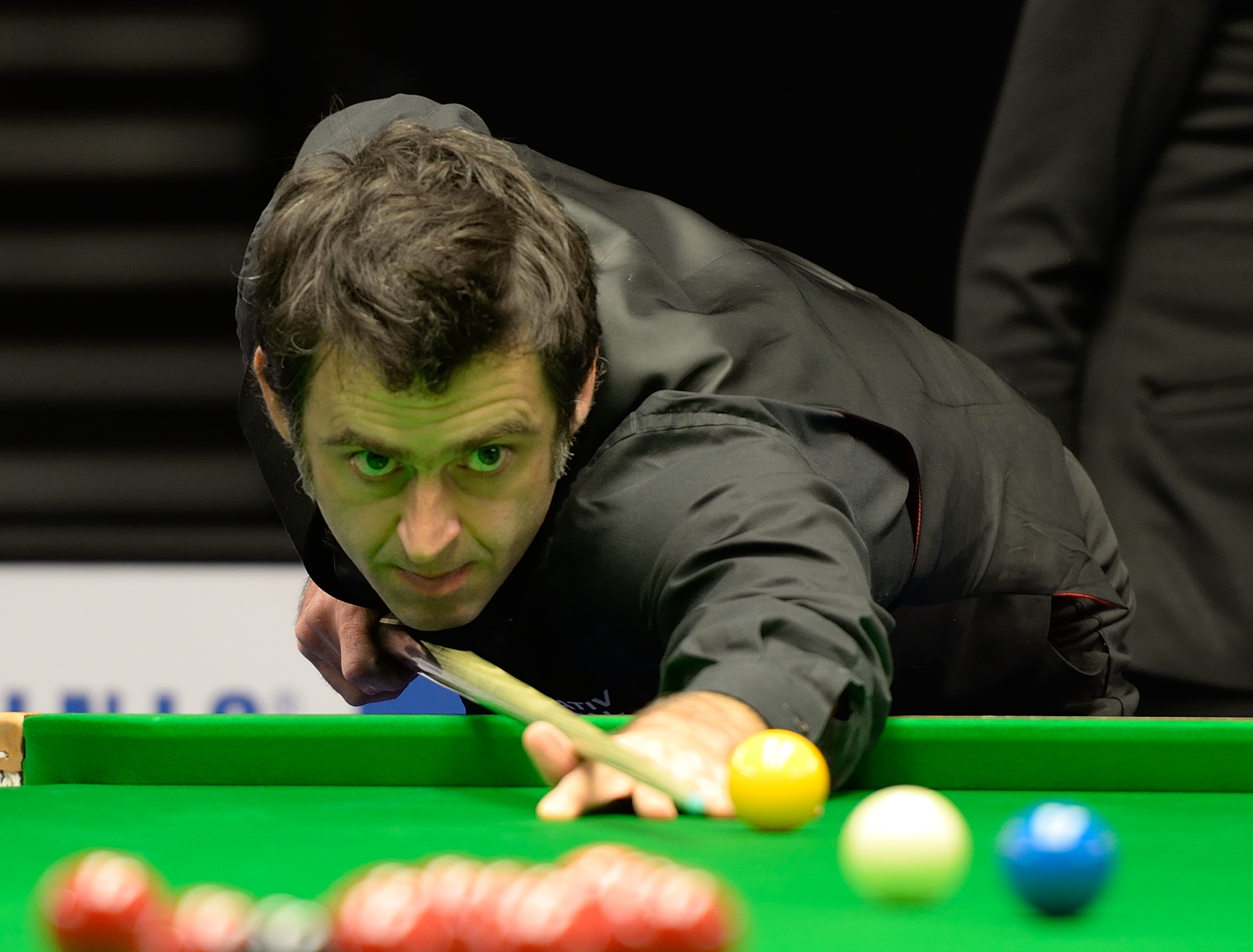
Ronnie O'Sullivan (pictured in 2015) defeated Ali Carter 10‍–‍7 to win a record-extending 8th Masters title and 23rd Triple Crown title. Aged 48 years and 40 days, he became the oldest Masters winner, having also been the youngest.

The final was played on 14 January as the best of 19 frames held over two sessions, between O'Sullivan and Carter. The final was officiated by Ben Williams. O'Sullivan contested his 14th Masters final, having won 7 and lost 6 previously, while Carter competed in his second, having lost the 2020 final to Stuart Bingham. The two players had met 25 times previously in professional play. Carter had won only three of those matches and only one match that was best-of-seven or longer, in the second round of the 2018 World Championship. (Note: Sources are inconsistent as to what the career head-to-head statistics are. World Snooker Tour lists the head-to-head as 17‍–‍1, but Eurosport lists this as 18‍–‍1.) It was the third time the players had contested a Triple Crown final, having previously met in the 2008 and 2012 World Championship finals, both of which O'Sullivan won.

O'Sullivan won the opening frame of the first session, but Carter made a century break of 106 in the second and also won the third frame to lead 2‍–‍1. O'Sullivan responded with a break of 125 to level the scores at 2‍–‍2 at the mid-session interval. Carter won the fifth frame with a century break of 122, before winning frame six. O'Sullivan made a break of 86 in the penultimate frame, but Carter made a 74 break in the eighth frame to lead 5‍–‍3 after the first session.

In the evening session, Carter extended his advantage to 6‍–‍3 by winning the ninth frame, but O'Sullivan won the next with a break of 58. He also won the 11th frame and then made a 64 break to tie the scores at 6‍–‍6 at the mid-session interval. Carter made a century break of 127 in frame 13, his ninth century break at the tournament, breaking O'Sullivan's record of eight at the 2007 and 2009 events. However, O'Sullivan won the next two frames to take the lead at 8‍–‍7, before making a break of 89 to move one frame from victory. Carter's missed pot on a red ball in frame 17 let O'Sullivan complete a 10‍–‍7 victory and win a record-extending 8th Masters title and 23rd Triple Crown title. He became the oldest Masters winner, aged 48 years and 40 days, surpassing Bingham, who won the 2020 event aged 43 years and 243 days. O'Sullivan already held the record as the youngest winner at the Masters, having won the 1995 event aged 19 years and 69 days.

Speaking after the match, O'Sullivan commented that Carter had played poorly in the second session, but said that Carter would have had to "scrape me off the table" to win. Carter said he was "gutted" but spoke positively about reaching the final for a second time. Having lost his third major final to O'Sullivan, Carter quoted Jimmy White, who said "he's beginning to annoy me" after losing his fourth World Championship final to Stephen Hendry in 1994. O'Sullivan announced that he would take two months away from the sport and miss some tournaments: "Too much intense snooker for me is not good. I now need to back off and consolidate, and get some fun in the game."

O'Sullivan's wins at the 2023 UK Championship and 2024 Masters marked the second time he had won two Triple Crown events in the same season; he had previously accomplished this in the 2007‍–‍08 season when he won the 2007 UK Championship and 2008 World Championship. It gave him the prospect of capturing all three Triple Crown events in the same season, a feat previously accomplished by three other players: Steve Davis in 1987‍–‍88, Hendry in the 1989‍–‍90 and 1995‍–‍96 seasons, and Williams in 2002‍–‍03. Commenting on this prospect, he said: "I've never been driven by titles or numbers. I could still win [the 2024 World Championship], but at the moment I feel like I am having to squeeze everything out just to get a result which is hard, but I am a competitor so I will keep fighting."

== Tournament draw ==
Numbers in parentheses after the players' names denote the players' seedings, and players in bold denote match winners. All matches were played as the best of 11 frames except the final, which was played as the best of 19 frames.

**First round** Best of 11 frames
**Judd Trump (ENG) (1)**	**6**
Kyren Wilson (ENG) (9)	5
Mark Williams (WAL) (8)	4
**Ali Carter (ENG) (11)**	**6**
**Mark Selby (ENG) (5)**	**6**
Robert Milkins (ENG) (14)	1
**Mark Allen (NIR) (4)**	**6**
John Higgins (SCO) (10)	5
**Ronnie O'Sullivan (ENG) (3)**	**6**
Ding Junhui (CHN) (12)	3
Neil Robertson (AUS) (6)	3
**Barry Hawkins (ENG) (15)**	**6**
**Shaun Murphy (ENG) (7)**	**6**
Zhang Anda (CHN) (13)	2
Luca Brecel (BEL) (2)	2
**Jack Lisowski (ENG) (16)**	**6**

**Quarter-finals**; Best of 11 frames
Judd Trump (ENG) (1)	5
**Ali Carter (ENG) (11)**	**6**
Mark Selby (ENG) (5)	5
**Mark Allen (NIR) (4)**	**6**
**Ronnie O'Sullivan (ENG) (3)**	**6**
Barry Hawkins (ENG) (15)	3
**Shaun Murphy (ENG) (7)**	**6**
Jack Lisowski (ENG) (16)	3

**Semi-finals**; Best of 11 frames
**Ali Carter (ENG) (11)**	**6**
Mark Allen (NIR) (4)	3
**Ronnie O'Sullivan (ENG) (3)**	**6**
Shaun Murphy (ENG) (7)	2

**Final**; Best of 19 frames
Ali Carter (ENG) (11)	7
**Ronnie O'Sullivan (ENG) (3)**	**10**

=== Final ===
Final
Final: Best-of-19 frames. Referee: Ben Williams; Alexandra Palace, London, England, 14 January 2024
Ali Carter (11); England	7–**10**	**Ronnie O'Sullivan** (3); England
Afternoon: 5–**72**, **106**–0 (106), **68**–31, 0–**125** (125), **122**–14 (122), **59**–47, 0–**87**, **74**–0; Evening: **71**–39, 0–**78**, 21–**79**, 0–**117**, **127**–0 (127), 6–**105**, 41–**81**, 0–**90**, 4–**87**
(frame 13) **127**	Highest break	125 (frame 4)
**3**	Century breaks	1

== Controversies ==
The event was held at Alexandra Palace back-to-back after the 2024 PDC World Darts Championship. Both events had match play interrupted by insects. In the first round match between Mark Williams and Ali Carter, a fly landed on a red ball, which Williams was lining up for a pot. The match between Neil Robertson and Barry Hawkins was paused to allow referee Rob Spencer to remove a wasp from the table. In his quarter-final match against Carter, Judd Trump made a century break of 129 in the seventh frame, while having a wasp attached to his waistcoat throughout. Trump commented: "It's gone on a little bit too long now, they need to find a way to get rid of it, just to make it easier for the viewing public." Ronnie O'Sullivan criticised the venue, calling it "disgusting" and saying it "makes [him] feel ill".

The venue was often praised for its passionate crowd. However, during the quarter-final match against Robert Milkins, a clattering sound from the audience caused Mark Selby to miss a red. An enraged Selby swung his cue in the air and later called the noise "brain-dead". The crowd also drew sharp criticism from Carter after the final. The match was frequently disturbed by shouts from the audience. A frustrated Carter called them "some morons" after the match, saying: "You've got people shouting when you are on your shot and saying stupid things at important times because half of them haven't got enough brains, it's ridiculous."

In the post-match interview following the final, Carter accused O'Sullivan of "snotting all over the floor", calling it "outrageous behaviour from a top professional". O'Sullivan responded with a series of expletive-laden tirades, saying that "To have to play snooker against someone like that is a nightmare" and claiming that Carter needed to "sort his life out". He brandished a middle finger and said that "[Carter] can sit on it as far as I'm concerned." O'Sullivan, who is involved in a disciplinary dispute with the sport's governing body, the WPBSA, is being reviewed by the World Snooker Tour for the outburst.

== Century breaks ==
There were 27 century breaks made during the tournament. The highest of these were the two maximum breaks, the first by Ding Junhui in the opening round, and second by Mark Allen in the quarter-finals. The nine century breaks made by Carter were the most made by any player at a single Masters tournament.

- 147, 123, 103, 101 – Mark Allen
- 147 – Ding Junhui
- 133, 127, 122, 118, 106, 105, 103, 101, 100 – Ali Carter
- 131, 131, 123, 100 – Shaun Murphy
- 129, 101 – Judd Trump
- 127, 125, 106 – Ronnie O'Sullivan
- 119 – Mark Selby
- 117, 110 – Neil Robertson
- 100 – Jack Lisowski
