= 2020 Masters (snooker) =

Professional non-ranking snooker tournament

2020 Dafabet Masters
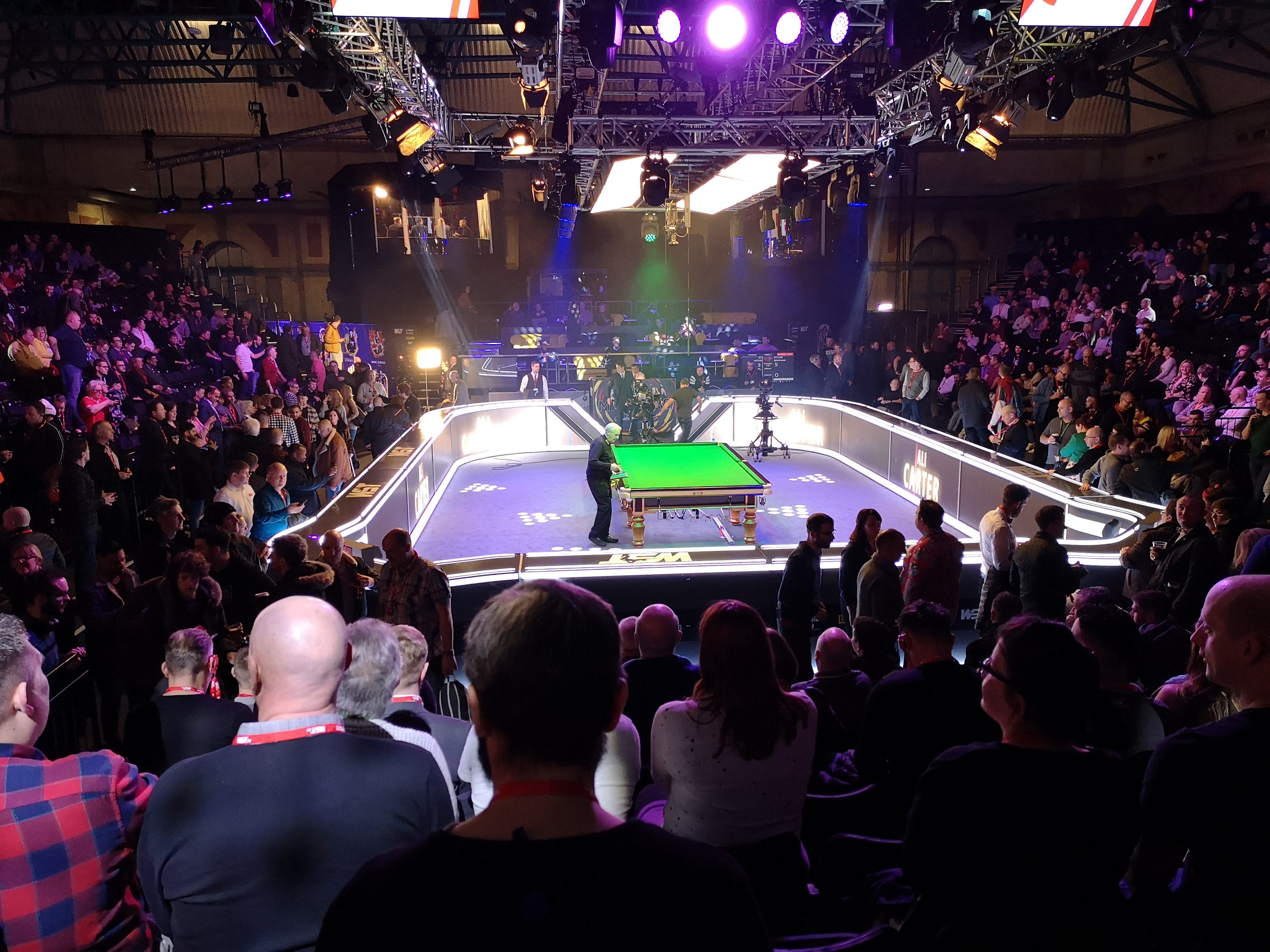
- Inside the event during the entrances for the final

Tournament information
- Dates: 12–19 January 2020
- Venue: Alexandra Palace
- City: London
- Country: England
- Organisation: World Snooker Tour
- Format: Non-ranking event
- Total prize fund: £725,000
- Winner's share: £250,000
- Highest break: David Gilbert (ENG) (144)

Final
- Champion: Stuart Bingham (ENG)
- Runner-up: Ali Carter (ENG)
- Score: 10–8

The 2020 Masters (officially the 2020 Dafabet Masters) was a professional non-ranking snooker tournament that took place at Alexandra Palace in London, England, from 12 to 19 January 2020. It was the 46th staging of the Masters tournament, which was first held in 1975, and the second of three Triple Crown events in the 2019–20 season, following the 2019 UK Championship and preceding the 2020 World Snooker Championship. The event invites the top sixteen players from the snooker world rankings in a knockout tournament. It was organised by the World Professional Billiards and Snooker Association and was broadcast by the BBC and Eurosport in Europe.

Judd Trump was the defending champion, having defeated Ronnie O'Sullivan 10–4 in the final of the previous year's event. Trump lost to Shaun Murphy 3–6 in the first round. O'Sullivan was eligible to compete, but chose not to participate, so his entry was given to Ali Carter, next on the world ranking list. Carter reached the final, where he played Stuart Bingham; recovering from 5–7 behind, Bingham won the final 10–8 to claim his first Masters title. He became the oldest Masters champion at the age of 43 years and 243 days, beating the previous record set by Ray Reardon in 1976; Bingham remained the tournament's oldest winner until 2024, when O'Sullivan won the title aged 48 years and 40 days.

As the winner of the event, Bingham received £250,000 from a total prize pool of £725,000. The tournament featured a total of eighteen century breaks; the highest break was a 144 compiled by David Gilbert in the quarter-finals, for which he won £15,000.

== Overview ==
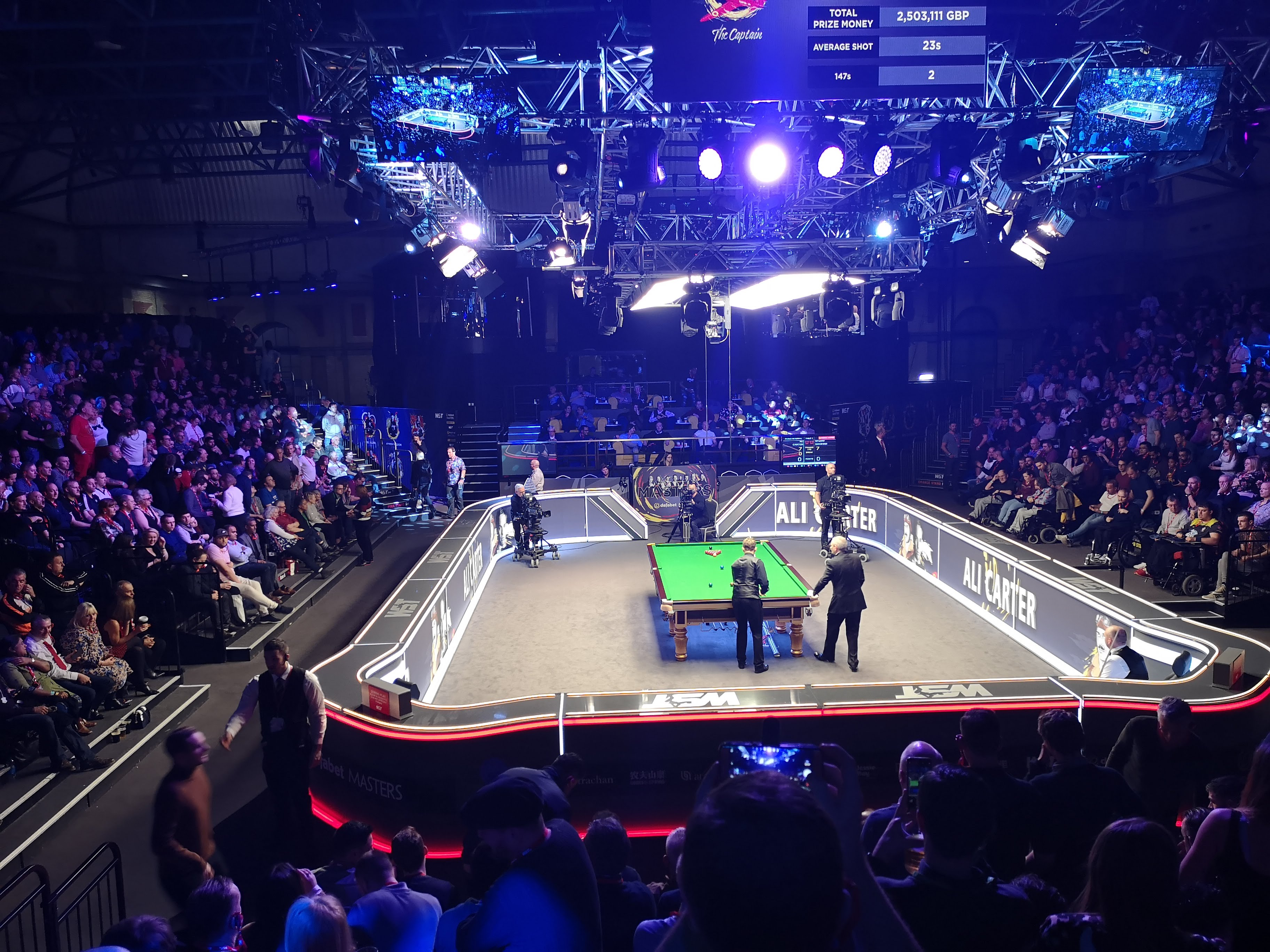
The setup inside Alexandra Palace during the tournament

The Masters is an annual invitational snooker tournament that was first held in 1975, with the top-16 players from the snooker world rankings invited to participate. The 2020 Masters was the second Triple Crown event of the 2019–20 snooker season, following the 2019 UK Championship and preceding the 2020 World Snooker Championship. The tournament was held between 12 and 19 January 2020. The sixteen highest-ranked players according to the world rankings after the UK Championship in December 2019 were invited to the event. Seven-time Masters champion and 2019 runner-up Ronnie O'Sullivan, ranked third, chose not to enter; his place was awarded to Ali Carter, who was ranked 17th prior to the tournament. World Snooker reported that O'Sullivan had pulled out of the event for "personal reasons", but he later commented that the reason they had stated was a "mistake" and that he had not wished to take part. David Gilbert made his Masters debut at the event.

The draw for the tournament was held during the final of the 2019 UK Championship. As in previous years, the top eight seeds were allocated fixed positions in the draw. All matches were played as best-of-11-frames matches, except for the final which was played over a maximum of 19 frames. The week before the 2020 Masters, organisers World Snooker were re-branded as the "World Snooker Tour". In addition to this change, the Triple Crown was renamed the "Triple Crown Series", and players who had won all three events in the series wore a crown on their playing waistcoats. The 2020 Masters was the first event to feature these changes in branding. The tournament was sponsored, for the last time, by sports betting company Dafabet.

=== Prize fund ===
The prize fund for the event was £725,000, with the winner receiving £250,000. This was an increase of £125,000 over the previous year's total prize fund and an extra £50,000 for the top prize.

- Winner: £250,000
- Runner-up: £100,000
- Semi-finals: £60,000
- Quarter-finals: £30,000
- Last 16: £15,000
- Highest break: £15,000
- Total: £725,000

== Summary ==
=== First round ===
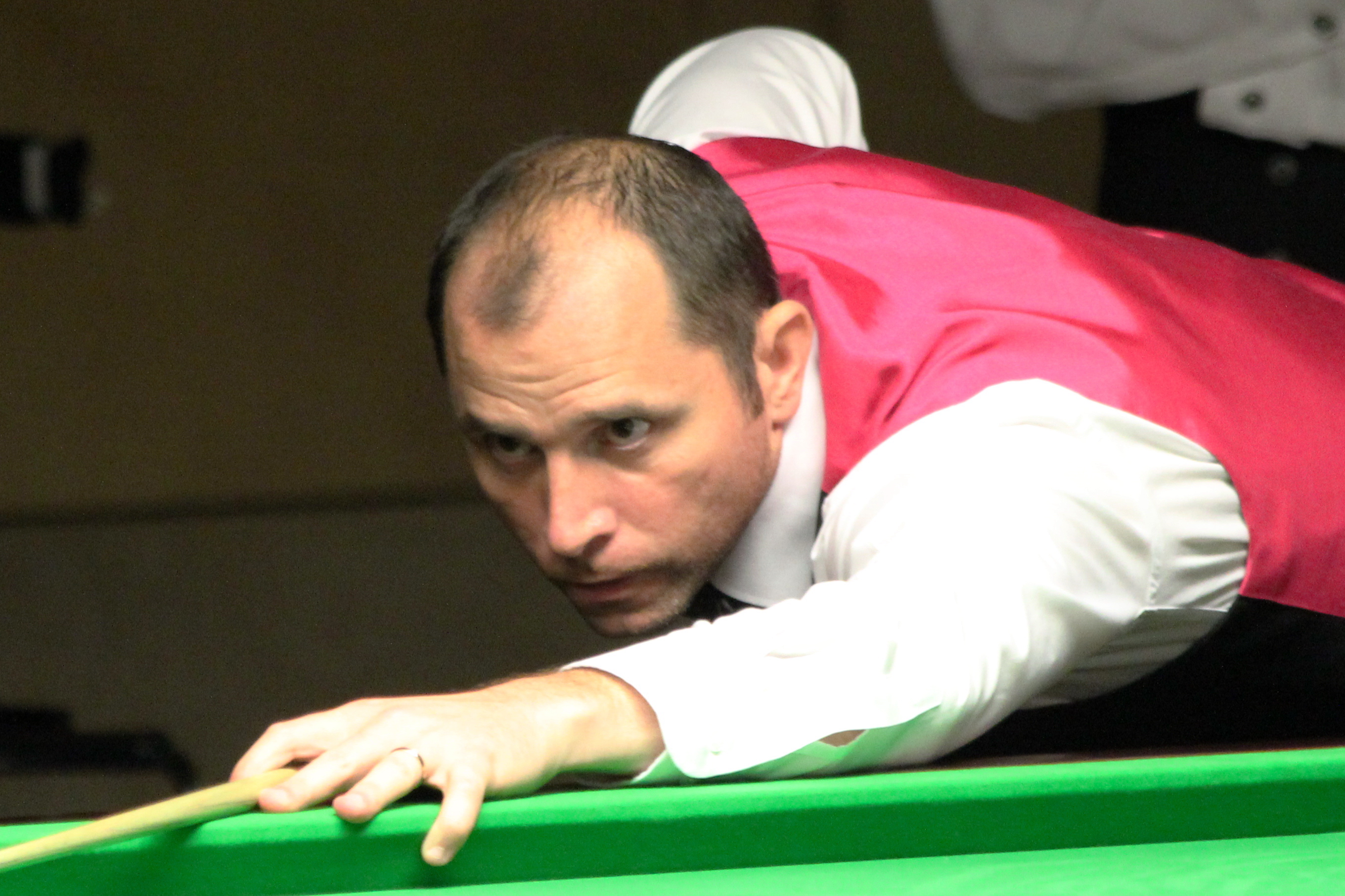
Joe Perry won the opening match of the tournament, defeating the 2019 UK Champion, Ding Junhui.

The Masters began on 12 January 2020 with first-round matches played as best-of-11-frames. The 2019 UK champion and eighth seed Ding Junhui took on 15th seed Joe Perry in the opening match. Perry was runner-up in his last appearance at the event in 2017 but had not participated in the intervening two years, whilst Ding had won only three matches at the Masters since winning the event in 2011. Perry took the opening frame, before Ding completed a break of 135 in the second frame, the first century break of the tournament. Perry won frame three and Ding took the fourth to tie the match at 2–2 at the interval. Perry took a 3–2 lead before Ding again equalised at 3–3, but then Perry scored a break of 93 to retake the lead at 4–3. Ding, on a break of 41 and likely to win frame eight, ran out of position allowing Perry to increase his lead to 5–3, winning the match in the next frame. He commented afterwards that "the interval came at the right time" for him as his performance improved in the second half of the match.

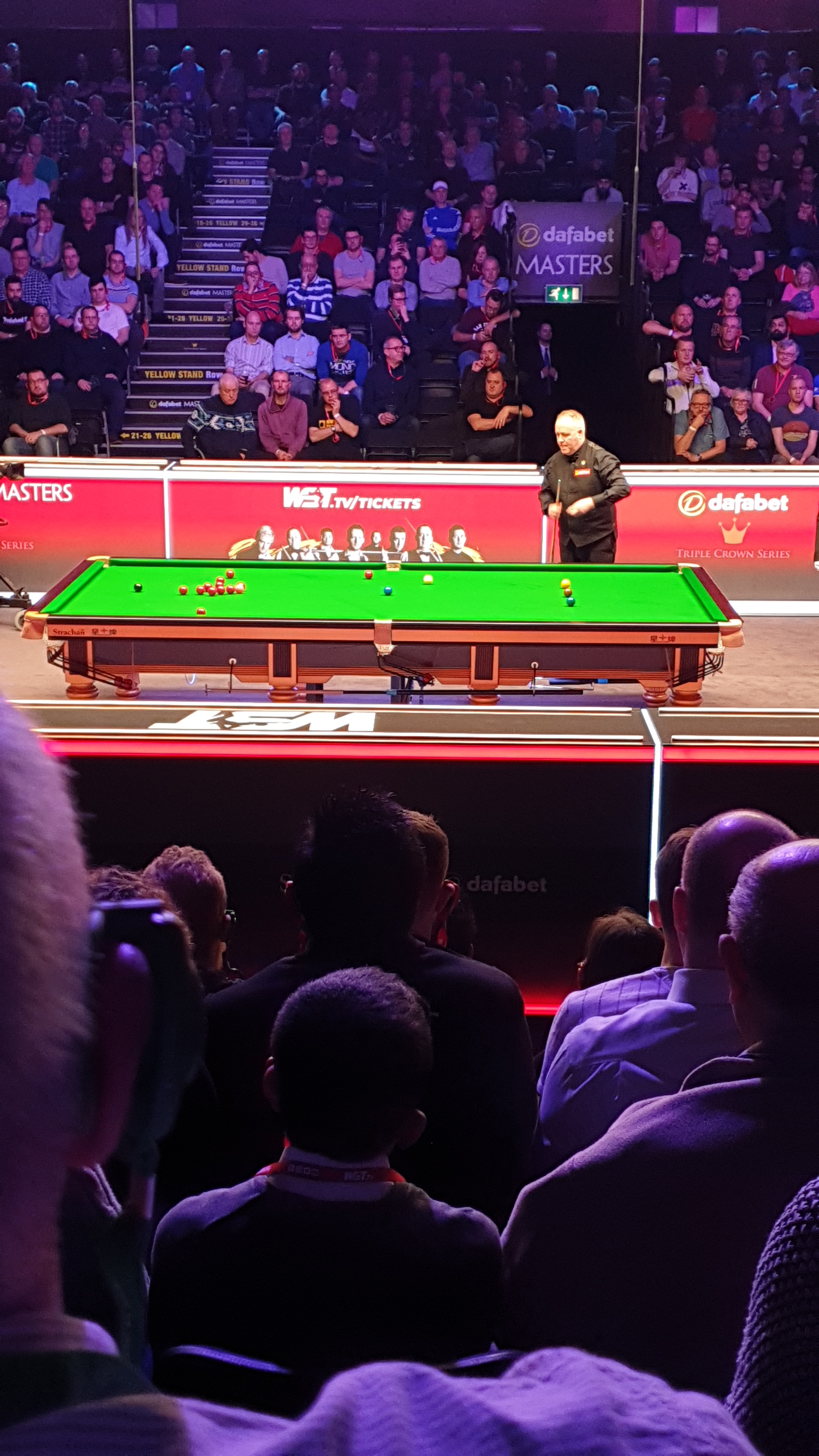
John Higgins (pictured at the event) was one of just two higher-ranked players to win in the first round.

Three-time Masters champion and fourth seed Mark Selby played the lowest seed, Ali Carter, in the second first-round match. Carter, 17th in the world rankings, had qualified for the event after world number three Ronnie O'Sullivan had chosen not to participate. Carter won the opening frame, escaping from a snooker with a fluke shot that resulted in him potting a red ball when 8–51 behind. He also won frame two, after requiring two snookers, and was leading 3–1 at the interval. Selby then won three consecutive frames and took the lead for the first time, including a break of 94 in frame six, but Carter responded by taking the next three frames, with breaks of 63 and 68 in the last two, to win the match 6–4.

The 2012 Masters champion Neil Robertson played UK Championship runner-up Stephen Maguire. Robertson won the first four frames to lead 4–0 at the interval, and later 5–1, before Maguire took frame seven with a break of 105. During this frame, he played a shot that BBC commentator Steve Davis described as "the most amazing shot in the history of snooker." In attempting to pot a red ball into the top right pocket, Maguire struck the cue ball with such force that the red leapt into the air after hitting the back of the pocket and landed on the table. The shot had so much backspin that it rolled back into the pocket; the cue ball jumped the pack of reds, hit the knuckle of the right middle pocket and went in-off in the bottom right pocket. Robertson was leading 56–0 in frame eight, but Maguire capitalised on missed shots to win the frame. He also took the next two frames to force a deciding frame. Robertson gained the first chance in the final frame, but missed a shot on the black, allowing Maguire to make a break of 62 and win the match. Maguire was informed afterwards that at the interval following the first four frames, bookmakers had made him 25:1 against winning the match.

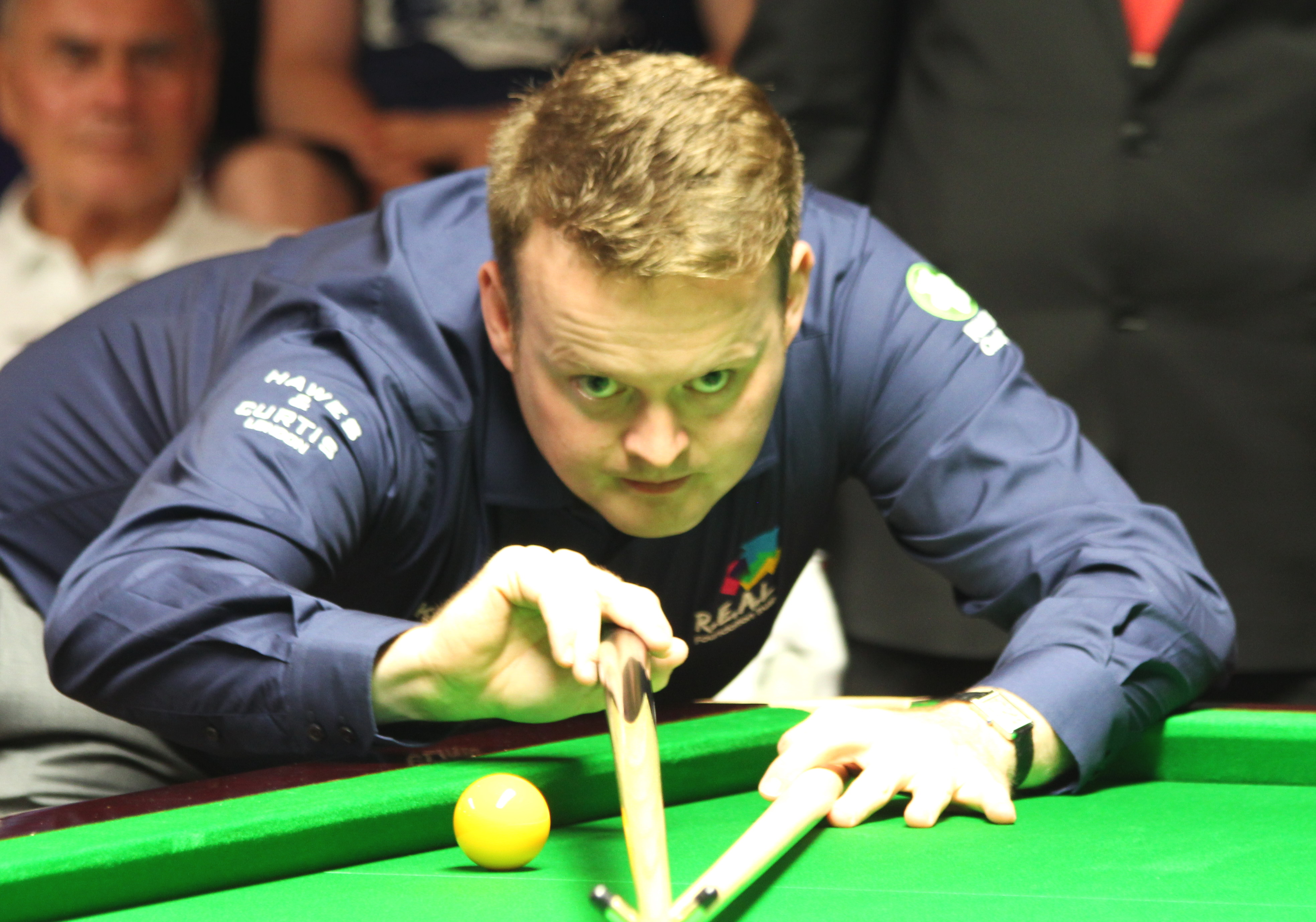
Ninth seed Shaun Murphy defeated the defending champion Judd Trump 6–3 in the first round.

Debutant David Gilbert played 2018 Masters champion Mark Allen. Gilbert won the first frame with a break of 77, and the second with a break of 121. Allen was leading 59–12 in frame three, before Gilbert cleared the table with a break of 58 to clinch the frame, and also took frame four to lead 4–0 at the interval. Allen then won frame five, but Gilbert took the next two frames, including a break of 95, to win the match 6–1. Having missed only eight pots during the entire match, Gilbert commented that his performance was "probably the best [he had] ever played".

Defending champion Judd Trump met 2015 Masters champion Shaun Murphy in the first round. Trump made three century breaks in the first five frames to lead 3–2. The third of these was his 678th century in competitive play, moving him into fourth place in the list of players that have made the most career century breaks. Despite Trump's strong start, Murphy took all of the next four frames to win 6–3, a scoreline that Trump later described as "flattering" for Murphy. Two-time champion John Higgins played Barry Hawkins, with Higgins winning the first five frames of the match. Hawkins took frame six with a century break, before Higgins won frame seven to triumph 6–1. Seeded fourth, Higgins was the first higher-ranked player to progress from the first round to the quarter-finals.

On 15 January, the final day of the first round, the 2018 runner-up Kyren Wilson played Jack Lisowski, and two-time Masters champion Mark Williams played Stuart Bingham. Lisowski won the opening two frames of the first match, before Wilson took six frames in a row to win 6–2. Wilson later remarked that Lisowski was "flawless for two frames", but O'Sullivan commentating for Eurosport said of Lisowski: "to lose six frames on the bounce, you can't do that. There's something seriously wrong in your game." Seeded seventh, Wilson was one of only two higher-ranked players to win in the first round, the other being Higgins on the previous day. During frame five of the match, referee Ben Williams was stung by a wasp when attempting to remove it from the table. The other match was tied 2–2 at the interval; Bingham then won four straight frames, with breaks of 50, 76, 86 and 54, to defeat Williams 6–2.

=== Quarter-finals ===
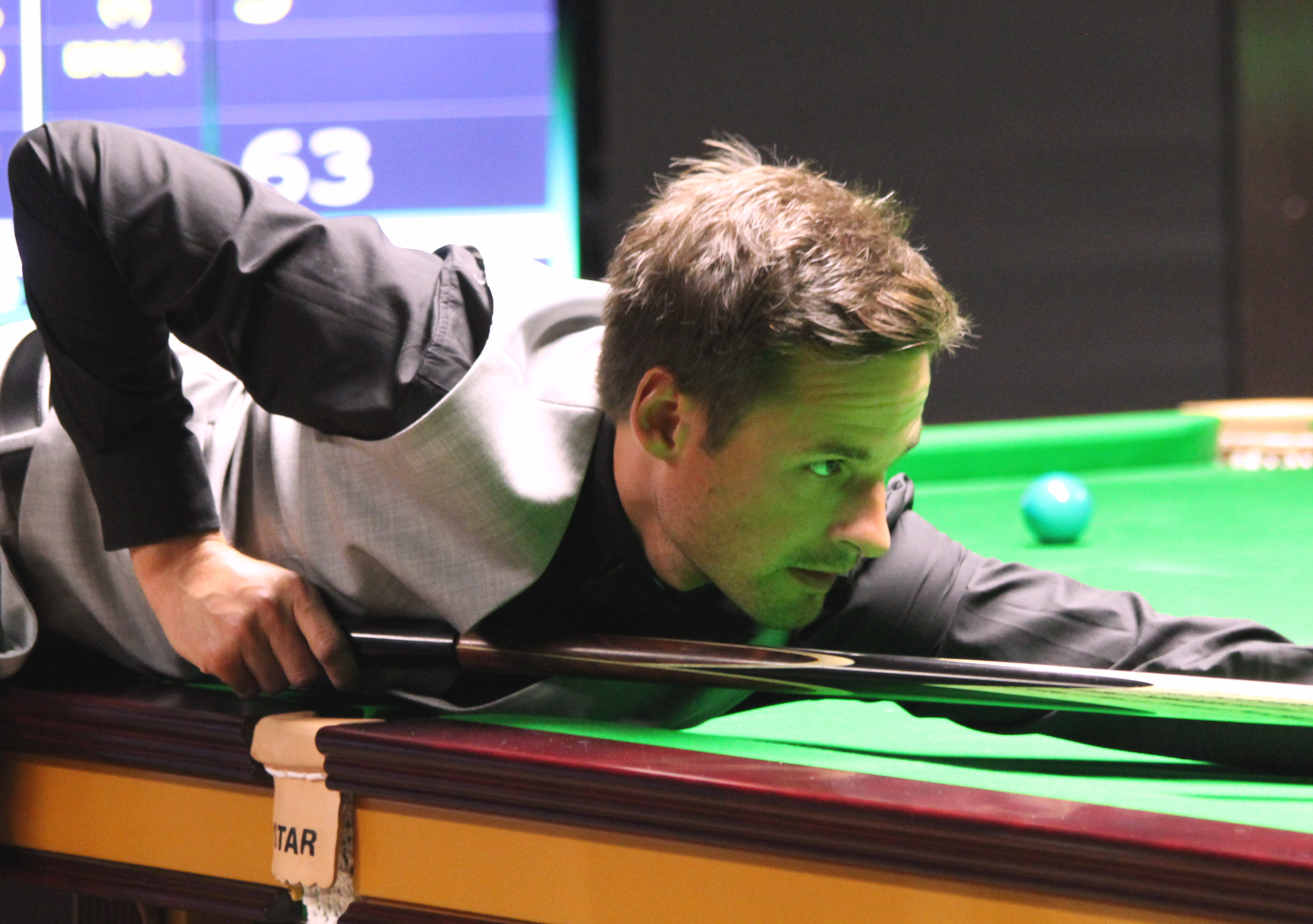
Playing at the Masters for the first time, David Gilbert defeated Stephen Maguire 6–2 to reach the semi-finals.

The quarter-finals were played on 16 and 17 January as best-of-11-frames. Shaun Murphy played Joe Perry in the first quarter-final match. Murphy won three of the first four frames making three breaks of 50 or more. Perry took frame five, then Murphy won frame six to lead 4–2. On a break of 50 and looking likely to win frame seven, Perry missed a red, allowing Murphy to clear the table for a 5–2 lead, thus winning the match in frame eight.

Ali Carter played John Higgins in the second quarter-final. Carter opened a 4–1 lead, before Higgins compiled a break of 140 to win frame six, and then took frame seven with a break of 73 to move within one frame of his opponent at 3–4 behind. In frame eight, Carter played a roll-up to the yellow ball, which was called as a foul by referee Desislava Bozhilova, who deemed the cue ball not to have made contact with the object ball. Carter, however, believed that the balls had touched and challenged the referee's decision, which was then reversed. Video replays of the event showed that the balls had not actually made contact. Carter won the frame, as well as frame nine, to win the match 6–3.

David Gilbert played Stephen Maguire in the third quarter-final. Gilbert won the first frame with the highest break of the tournament, a 144. He also won the second frame, followed by a break of 91 in the third to lead 3–0. Maguire took frame four, but Gilbert won the next by a single point, also winning frame six by a narrow margin. Maguire won frame seven with a break of 94, falling short of a 101 after playing a foul shot. Gilbert took the next frame to win the match 6–2.

The last quarter-final was between Kyren Wilson and Stuart Bingham. Wilson won the opening frame with a 139 total clearance, and then established a 4–1 lead. Bingham won frame six with a double on the black ball, and took the next two frames to draw level at 4–4. He then won two further frames, making it five in a row, to win the match 6–4.

=== Semi-finals ===
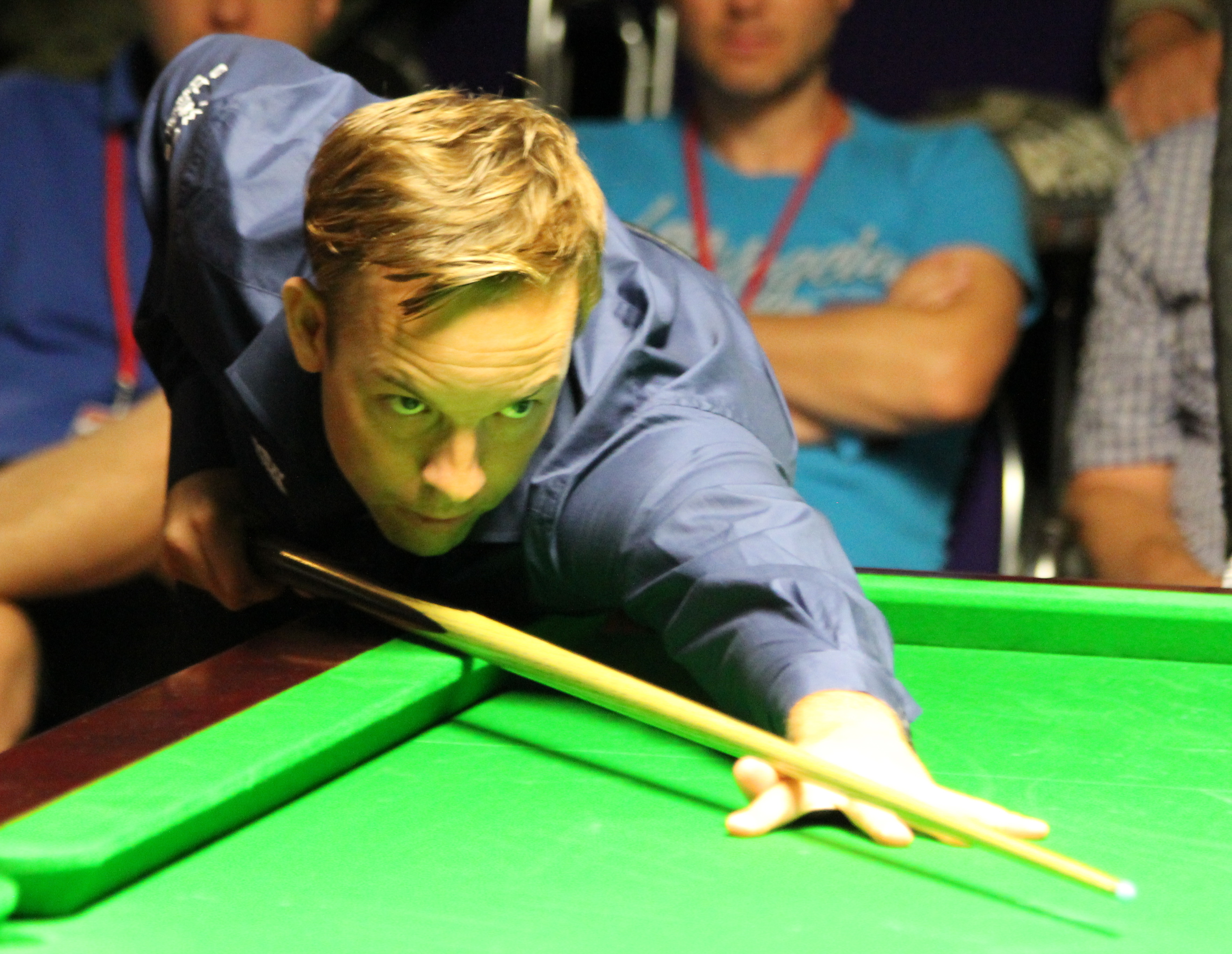
World number 17 Ali Carter defeated Shaun Murphy 6–3 to reach his first Masters final.

The semi-finals were played on 18 January as best-of-11-frames. The sole remaining former Masters champion, Shaun Murphy, played Ali Carter. The first frame featured a break of 68 from Carter, who later won the frame after some safety play. Carter won the second frame; Murphy won the third with a break of 105, but Carter won the fourth frame to lead 3–1. Murphy scored his second century of the match, a 110, in frame five. He was on course to make another century in frame six, but a poor shot meant that he finished on only 56, allowing Carter to lead 4–2. Carter looked likely to lead 5–2, requiring three shots to win frame seven, but missed a shot on the brown ball, allowing Murphy to clinch the frame. Leading by 30 points with 35 remaining, Carter declined to pot a blue ball worth five points, playing a snooker instead. Murphy escaped the snooker and laid a snooker of his own; escaping this snooker, Carter fluked the shot and won the frame. He also took frame nine with a break of 97, to win the match 6–3.

The second semi-final was between David Gilbert and Stuart Bingham. Gilbert had yet to defeat Bingham in professional play, having met him on ten previous occasions. Bingham won the first three frames, with a break of 94 in the first, before Gilbert won frame four. Bingham won the next two frames, including a break of 75, to lead 5–1. Gilbert won frame seven, but Bingham took the eighth, including his only century of the tournament, to win the match 6–2. The frame ball shot on the red rattled in the bottom right corner, before being fluked into the left corner pocket.

=== Final ===
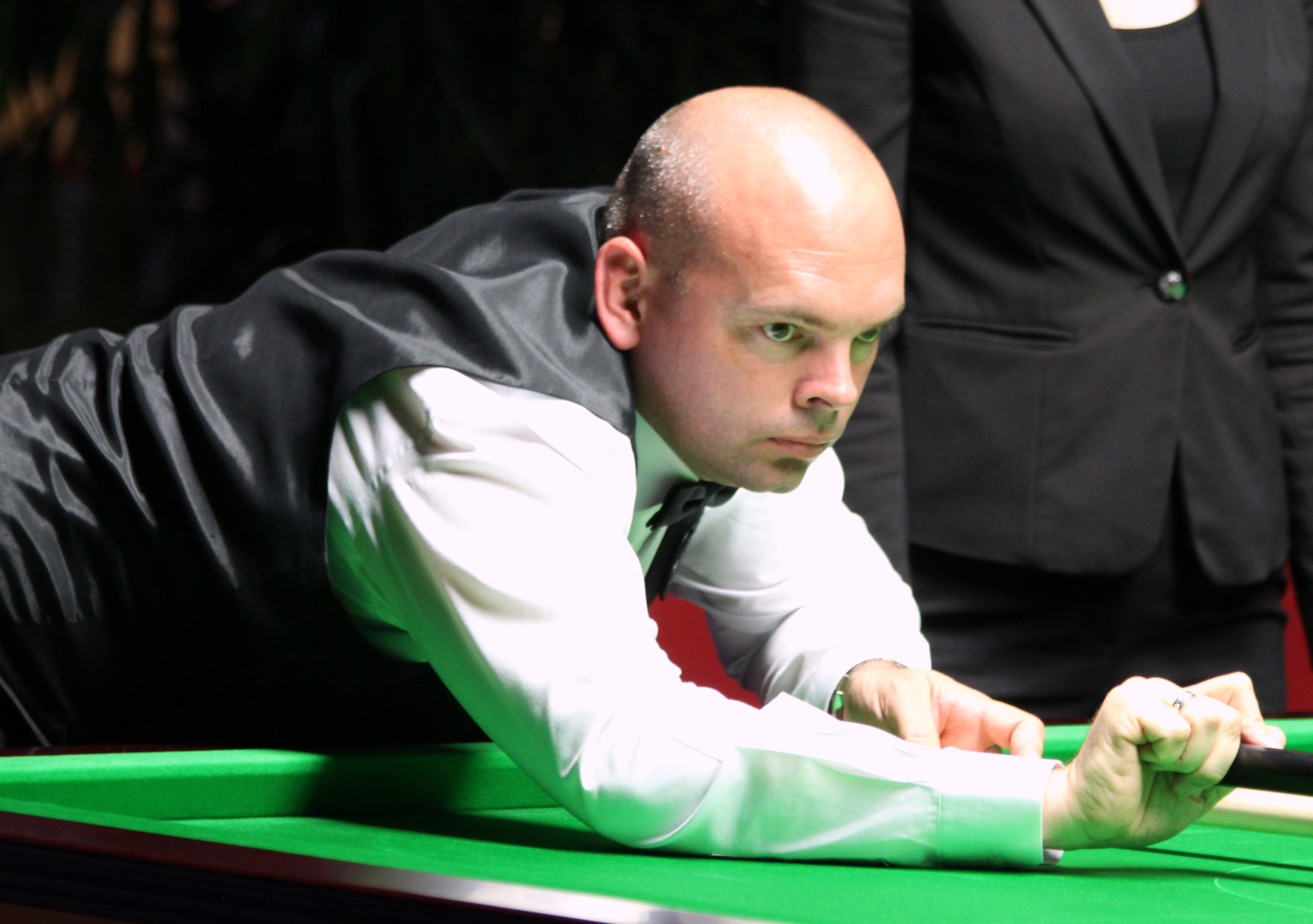
Stuart Bingham won the event for the first time, to become the oldest Masters champion, aged 43.

The final was played as a best-of-19-frames match over two sessions on 19 January. The two finalists were Ali Carter and Stuart Bingham, both players from Essex. The pair had a 9–8 record of matches won in professional play in favour of Bingham. This was the first time that either player had reached the final of the Masters; ranked 17th in the world, Carter was the first player since Ronnie O'Sullivan in 2014 to appear in the final while ranked outside the world's top 16. The match referee was Brendan Moore. The winner of the match would receive the Paul Hunter Trophy, named after the three-time Masters champion.

The first session began at 1:00 p.m. Greenwich Mean Time. Carter won the first frame with a break of 126, before Bingham claimed the next two frames, after missed shots from Carter, to lead 2–1. Carter attempted a maximum break in frame four, potting seven reds and seven blacks, but only scored 56. After Bingham scored 23, Carter clinched the frame to tie the match at 2–2. He also won frame five, which was briefly delayed by a "whoopee cushion" device being set off in the crowd. Bingham took the next three frames to develop a 5–3 lead going into the second session.

On resumption of the match, Carter won the first two frames to draw level again at 5–5. He also won frame 11 with a break of 95 and frame 12 with a break of 135, to lead 7–5 at the final interval. Bingham then won four consecutive frames, all with breaks of 50-plus, to level at 7–7 before moving into a 9–7 lead, one frame away from victory. Carter took frame 17 with a break of 77, but Bingham won the match 10–8 in the next frame, with a break of 109, his only century of the tournament. Aged 43 years and eight months, Bingham became the oldest winner of the tournament, five months older than the previous holder of this record, Ray Reardon, who had won the Masters title in 1976 aged 43 years and three months. Bingham remained the oldest Masters champion until the 2024 event, when O'Sullivan won the title aged 48.

== Tournament draw ==
Below are the results from the event. Players in bold denote the match winners, and numbers to the left of the player names are the seedings.

**First round** Best of 11 frames
1	Judd Trump (ENG)	3
9	**Shaun Murphy** (ENG)	**6**
8	Ding Junhui (CHN)	3
15	**Joe Perry** (ENG)	**6**
5	Mark Selby (ENG)	4
16	**Ali Carter** (ENG)	**6**
4	**John Higgins** (SCO)	**6**
10	Barry Hawkins (ENG)	1
3	Neil Robertson (AUS)	5
14	**Stephen Maguire** (SCO)	**6**
6	Mark Allen (NIR)	1
11	**David Gilbert** (ENG)	**6**
7	**Kyren Wilson** (ENG)	**6**
13	Jack Lisowski (ENG)	2
2	Mark Williams (WAL)	2
12	**Stuart Bingham** (ENG)	**6**

**Quarter-finals**; Best of 11 frames
9	(England) **Shaun Murphy**	**6**
15	(England) Joe Perry	3
16	(England) **Ali Carter**	**6**
4	(Scotland) John Higgins	3
14	(Scotland) Stephen Maguire	2
11	(England) **David Gilbert**	**6**
7	(England) Kyren Wilson	4
12	(England) **Stuart Bingham**	**6**

**Semi-finals**; Best of 11 frames
9	(England) Shaun Murphy	3
16	(England) **Ali Carter**	**6**
11	(England) David Gilbert	2
12	(England) **Stuart Bingham**	**6**

**Final**; Best of 19 frames
16	(England) Ali Carter	8
12	(England) **Stuart Bingham**	**10**

=== Final ===
Final: Best of 19 frames. Referee: Brendan Moore. Alexandra Palace, London, England, 19 January 2020.
Ali Carter (16); England	8–**10**	**Stuart Bingham** (12); England
Afternoon: **126**–8 (126), 5–**122** (75), 56–**78**, **73**–23 (56), **94**–0 (93), 69–**81** (66), 5–**96** (50), 45–**67**; Evening: **87**–4, **75**–22, **95**–37 (95), **134**–0 (133), 8–**71** (64), 0–**85** (85), 26–**63** (58), 0–**88** (88), **77**–3 (77), 1–**109** (109)
**133**	Highest break	109
**2**	Century breaks	1
6	50+ breaks	**8**

== Century breaks ==
There was a total of 18 century breaks made during the tournament. Neil Robertson pledged to pay £100 for every century made, plus an additional £5,000, towards New South Wales' wildlife charity NSW Wildlife Information Rescue and Education Service to help recovery from the 2019–20 Australian bushfires. World Snooker Tour indicated that they would donate the same amount.

- 144, 131, 121 – David Gilbert
- 140 – John Higgins
- 139 – Kyren Wilson
- 136 – Neil Robertson
- 135 – Ding Junhui
- 133, 126 – Ali Carter
- 128, 119, 116 – Judd Trump
- 120, 110, 105 – Shaun Murphy
- 109 – Stuart Bingham
- 105 – Stephen Maguire
- 101 – Barry Hawkins

== Broadcasting ==
The tournament was broadcast live in the United Kingdom by BBC Sport, as well as on Eurosport in Europe. Worldwide, the event was covered by China Central Television and Superstars Online in China and Sky Sports in New Zealand. The event was simulcast in Hong Kong by Now TV with additional commentary; DAZN covered the event across Canada, Brazil and the United States.
