= 2015 Masters (snooker) =

Professional non-ranking snooker tournament, Jan 2015

2015 Dafabet Masters
Tournament information
- Dates: 11–18 January 2015
- Venue: Alexandra Palace
- City: London
- Country: England
- Organisation: World Snooker
- Format: Non-ranking event
- Total prize fund: £600,000
- Winner's share: £200,000
- Highest break: Marco Fu (HKG) (147)

Final
- Champion: Shaun Murphy (ENG)
- Runner-up: Neil Robertson (AUS)
- Score: 10–2

The 2015 Masters (officially the 2015 Dafabet Masters) was a professional non-ranking snooker tournament that took place between 11 and 18 January 2015 at the Alexandra Palace in London, England. It was the 41st staging of the Masters tournament, which was first held in 1975, and the second of three Triple Crown events in the 2014–15 snooker season, following the 2014 UK Championship and preceding the 2015 World Championship. It was sponsored by online betting site Dafabet.

The participants were invited to the tournament based on the world rankings as they stood after the UK Championship. However, Ali Carter, who had been unable to take part in several events due to lung cancer, had his position amongst the top 16 frozen and was allowed to play, while Graeme Dott, who was 16th in the standing, had to sit out the event. Carter thus played his first match since being given all-clear from his illness. He received a standing ovation from the crowd before his first-round encounter with Barry Hawkins, which he won 6–1.

Ronnie O'Sullivan was the defending champion, having defeated Mark Selby 10–4 in the previous year's final. He equalled Stephen Hendry's career record of 775 competitive century breaks in his first-round match against Ricky Walden, on the exact date of Hendry's 46th birthday. Two days later, in the first frame of his quarter-final match against Marco Fu, O'Sullivan set a new record when he compiled the 776th century of his career. In defeating Fu 6–1, O'Sullivan also broke Hendry's record for the most wins in the Masters, setting a new record of 43. However, he lost 1–6 to Neil Robertson in the semi-finals. Shaun Murphy won his first Masters title, beating Robertson 10–2 in the final, the biggest winning margin in a Masters final since Steve Davis whitewashed Mike Hallett 9–0 in 1988. In winning the title, Murphy became the tenth player to win all Triple Crown events at least once. This year's final line up was a repeat of the 2012 tournament, albeit with a different result.

A total of 28 century breaks were compiled throughout the tournament. Marco Fu made the 112th official maximum break during his first-round match against Stuart Bingham. This was Fu's third official 147 and the seventh maximum break in the 2014–15 season. It was the third maximum break in Masters history, after Kirk Stevens's maximum in 1984 and Ding Junhui's in 2007.

== Overview ==
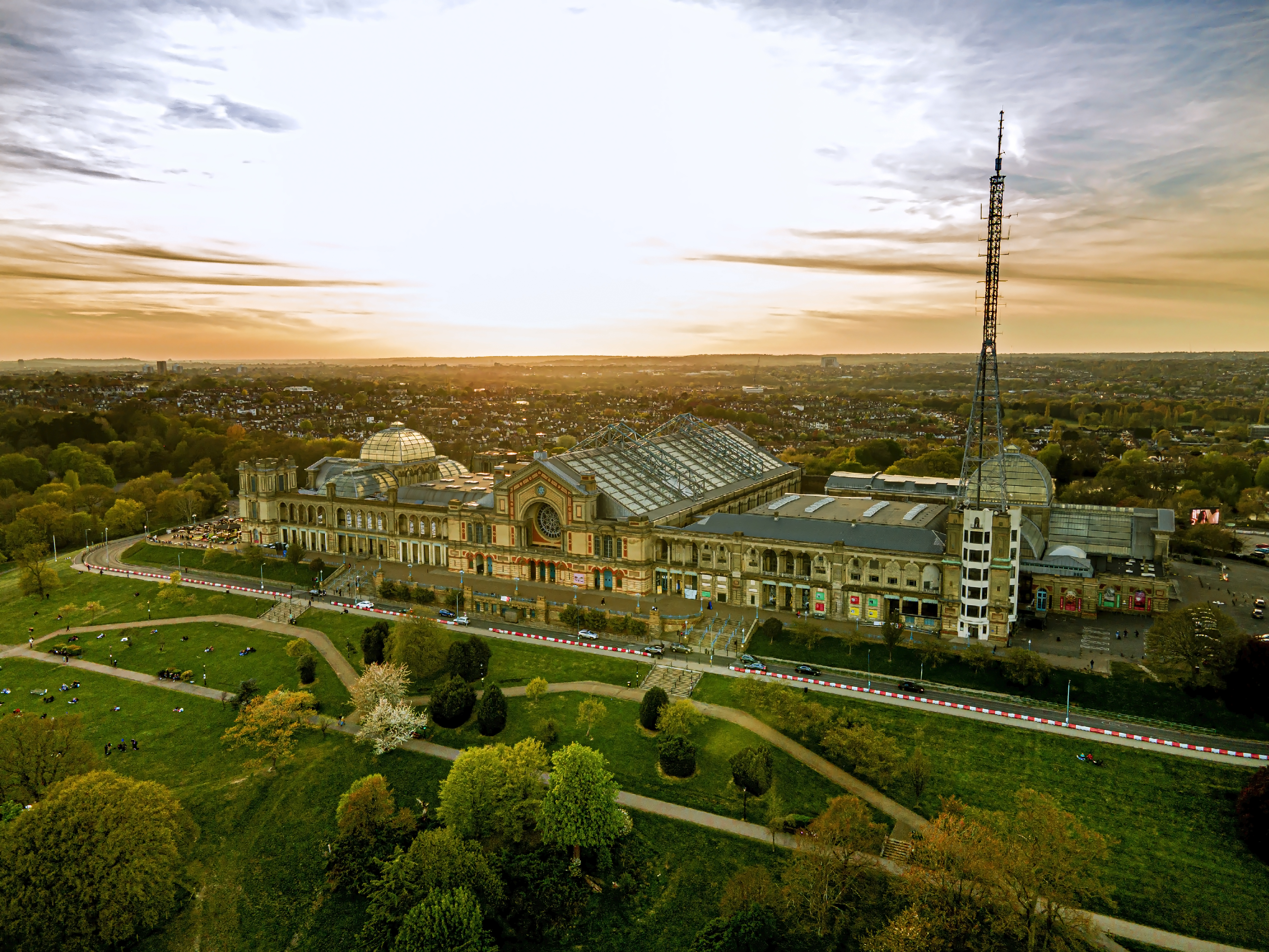
The event was held at the Alexandra Palace in London, England (pictured).

The Masters is an invitational snooker tournament first held in 1975. Organised by World Snooker, the 2015 Masters was the 41st staging of the tournament. It was the second Triple Crown event of the 2014–15 snooker season, following the 2014 UK Championship and preceding the 2015 World Championship. Held between 11 and 18 January 2015, the event was played at the Alexandra Palace in London. Matches were played as the best-of-11 frames until the final, which was the best-of-19 frames played over two sessions. The event was sponsored for the second time by online betting site Dafabet.

=== Participants ===
The event usually features the 16 players who are placed highest in the rankings after the UK Championship, which took place in December 2014. Ronnie O'Sullivan, the defending champion, was the number one seed, with Mark Selby, the rigning World Champion, seeded second. The remaining places were allocated to players based on the latest world rankings (revision 5 of the season), except that Ali Carter was seeded 13th, despite being ranked 18th, because of lung cancer, which had stopped him from playing for an extended period of time. World Snooker and the World Professional Billiards and Snooker Association decided to freeze his position amongst the top 16 for the remainder of the season "to make up lost ground" for the events he missed due to illness. Players ranked 13th to 15th were seeded 14th to 16th, while Graeme Dott, ranked 16th, was not invited. The field was the same as in 2014 except that Carter returned for his 9th appearance in place of Mark Davis.

=== Prize fund ===
The total prize money of the event was unchanged at £600,000. The breakdown of prize money for this year is shown below:

- Winner: £200,000
- Runner-up: £90,000
- Semi-finals: £50,000
- Quarter-finals: £25,000
- Last 16: £12,500
- Highest break: £10,000
- Total: £600,000

== Summary ==
=== First round ===
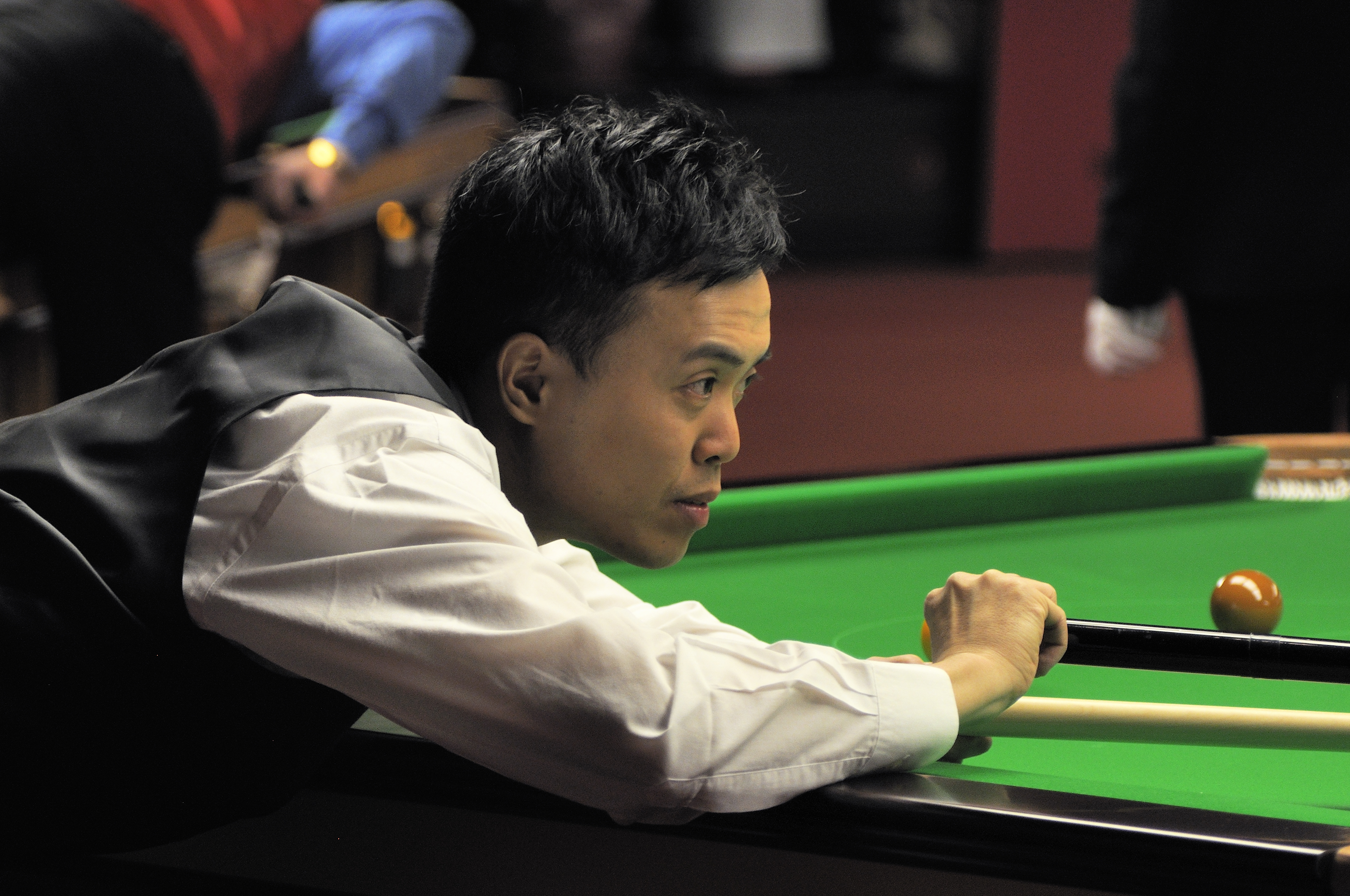
Marco Fu (pictured in 2014) compiled the third maximum break in Masters history in his first-round victory against Stuart Bingham.

The first round was played between 11 and 14 January 2015 as the best-of-11 frames. In the opening match, a repeat of the previous year semi-final, three-time champion and latest runner-up Mark Selby faced Shaun Murphy. Although Selby opened up with a century break of 100, Murphy put himself 5–1 ahead with five consecutive frames. Selby replied with four frames on the trot, including breaks of 120, 54 and 92, and forced a decider. Murphy clinched the match in the eleventh and final frame. In the evening, Marco Fu was already 2–1 ahead of Stuart Bingham when he made the 112th official maximum break. This was Fu's third official 147 and the seventh maximum break in the 2014–15 season. It was also the third maximum break in Masters history, after Kirk Stevens's in 1984 and Ding Junhui's in 2007. Fu went on to win the match with another century of 103 and a result of 6–3.

The following afternoon, 2012 semi-finalist Judd Trump was up against Stephen Maguire, who had reached the semi-finals of the event in 2007, 2009, 2010 and 2014. Although Trump took the first frame, in which both players managed to make a half-century, and followed it with the second, Maguire then won four on the spin, including breaks of 96 and 82. Trump replied with breaks of 109 and 71, but Maguire won the last two to seal victory. In the evening, Robert Milkins, competing in his second Masters, faced Neil Robertson, the 2012 champion. The first eight frames were shared, with breaks of 94 and 69 for Milkins and 60, 77, 51 and 95 for Roberston. The Australian claimed victory thanks to a 117 century and a further half-century of 76, for a result of 6–4.

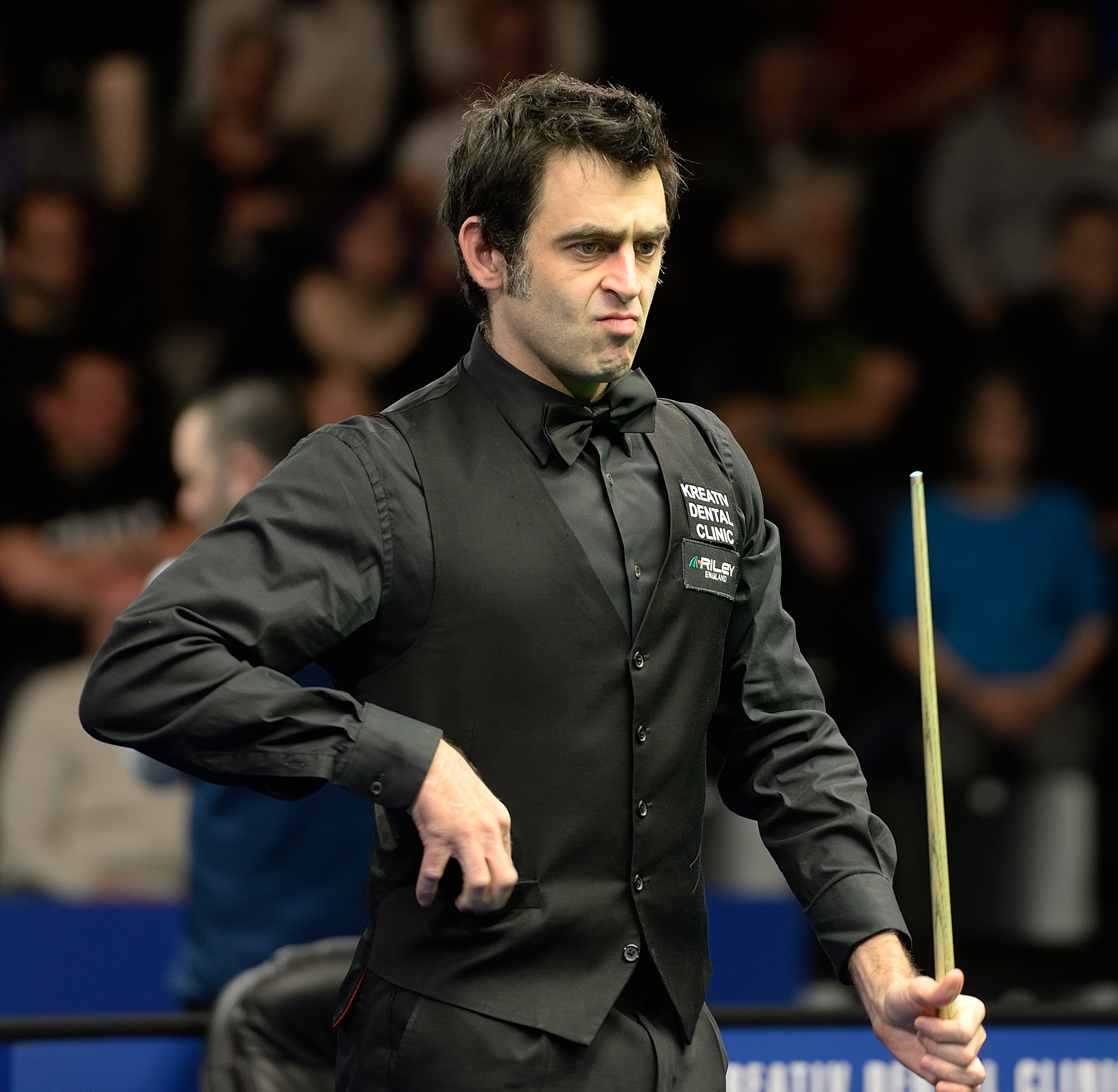
Ronnie O'Sullivan (pictured in 2015) won his first-round match against Ricky Walden and compiled with a fluke on the last yellow ball the 775th century break of his career, a record-equalling figure.

The next day, Ronnie O'Sullivan, the defending champion, played Ricky Walden. A 100-point century in the sixth frame gave O'Sullivan a 5–1 lead, but Walden replied with a century of 100 as well and managed to pull back to 4–5. In what would turn out to be the last frame of the match, O'Sullivan ran out of position when he was on 89, but managed to fluke the yellow ball and went on to clear up the rest of the colours to compile a 121 century. In doing so, he equalled Stephen Hendry's career record of 775 competitive century breaks. "I am not bothered, it was a matter of time", said Hendry, who turned 46 that very same day and was commentating for the BBC. In the evening, Ali Carter played his first match since being given all-clear from lung cancer. He received a standing ovation from the crowd before his encounter with Barry Hawkins, which he won 6–1, featuring breaks of 95, 50 and 130.

Mark Allen, 2011 semi-finalist, met John Higgins, 1999 and 2006 winner. Higgins won the first two frames with century breaks of 104 and 132, and Allen took the third with a further century of 121. Higgins was 3–1 in front at one point and also made a 120 in the penultimate frame, but would end up losing the match 4–6 to Allen, who edged him out with a 65 break. In the last match of the quarter-finals, Ding Junhui, the 2011 champion, was paired with Joe Perry, who had never got past the first round. Perry took the first frame with a break of 79, and Ding responded with an 80. Perry then opened a two-frame gap, including a century of 104, and ended up winning 6–3, closing out the match with a 104.

=== Quarter-finals ===
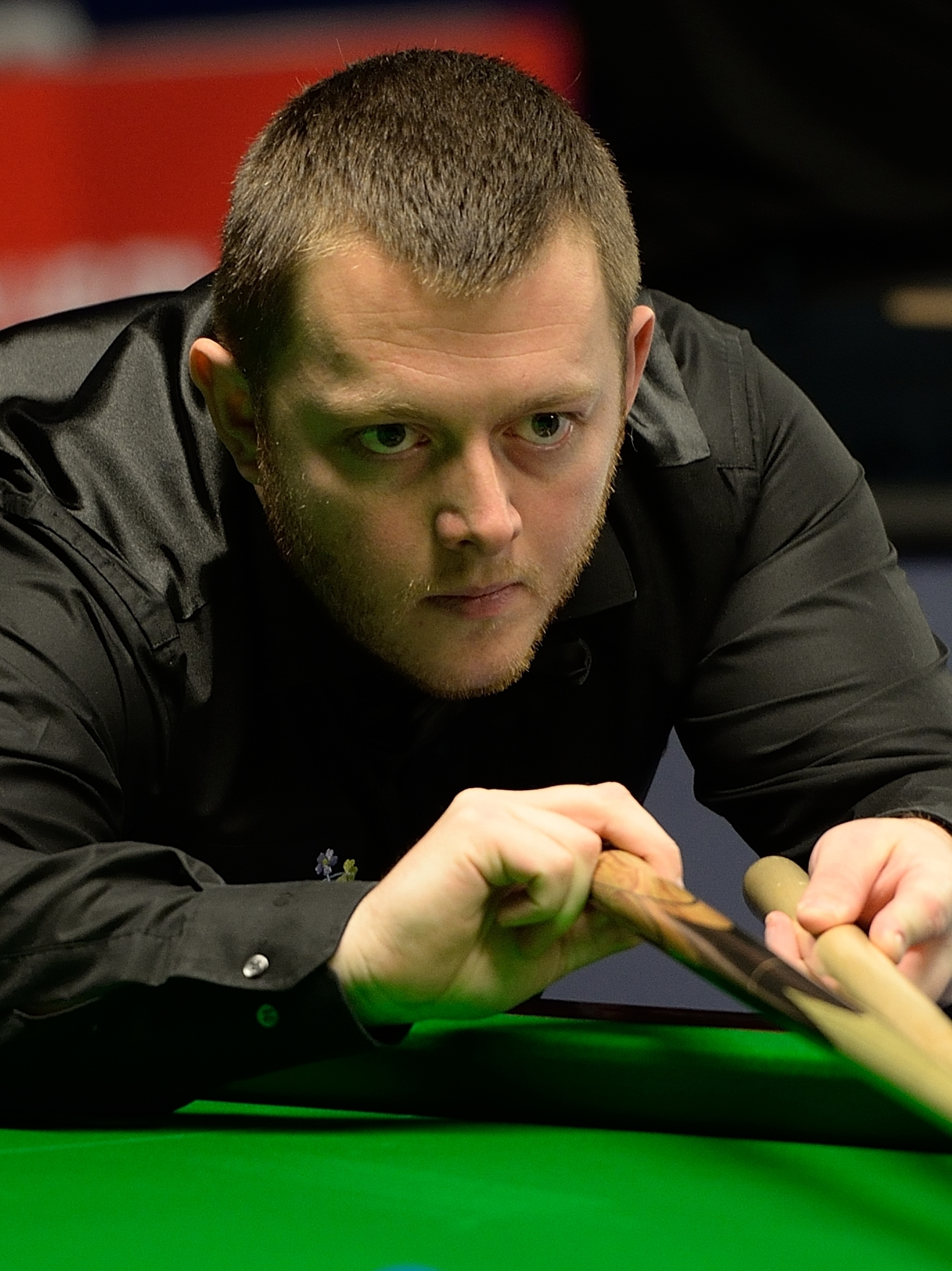
Mark Allen (pictured in 2015) took a 3–1 lead against Joe Perry and advanced into the semi-finals thanks to a 6–4 victory.

The quarter-finals took place on 15 and 16 January as the best-of-11 frames. In the first frame of his encounter with Fu, O'Sullivan made a 101 century and thus set a new record for most career centuries, surpassing by one the 775 made by Hendry. "I was a bit nervous because I knew everyone was thinking about it. It was nice to get it out of the way early", said O'Sullivan afterwards. Further breaks of 67, 85 and 66 secured him a 6–1 win, which meant that he also broke Hendry's record for the most wins in the Masters, setting a new tally of 43. Robertson took a 2–0 advantage with breaks of 128 and 57 against Carter, who responded with a 63 break in the third frame to halve the deficit. However, Roberston won the rest of the frames to seal a 6–1 victory, making breaks of 98, 127 and 84 in the process.

Allen raced into a 3–1 advantage, but Perry drew level with back-to-back frames, including breaks of 50 and 68. Allen took the ninth frame and, although Perry compiled a 67 break, Allen followed in with a 55 and won the match 6–4 in the following frame. In the last game of the quarter-finals, played that evening, scores were level between Maguire and Murphy after four frames, with a century of 137 for the former and another one of 103 for the latter. Murphy did not take the lead till the ninth frame, which he won with a century of 103, and then closed the match in the tenth.

=== Semi-finals ===
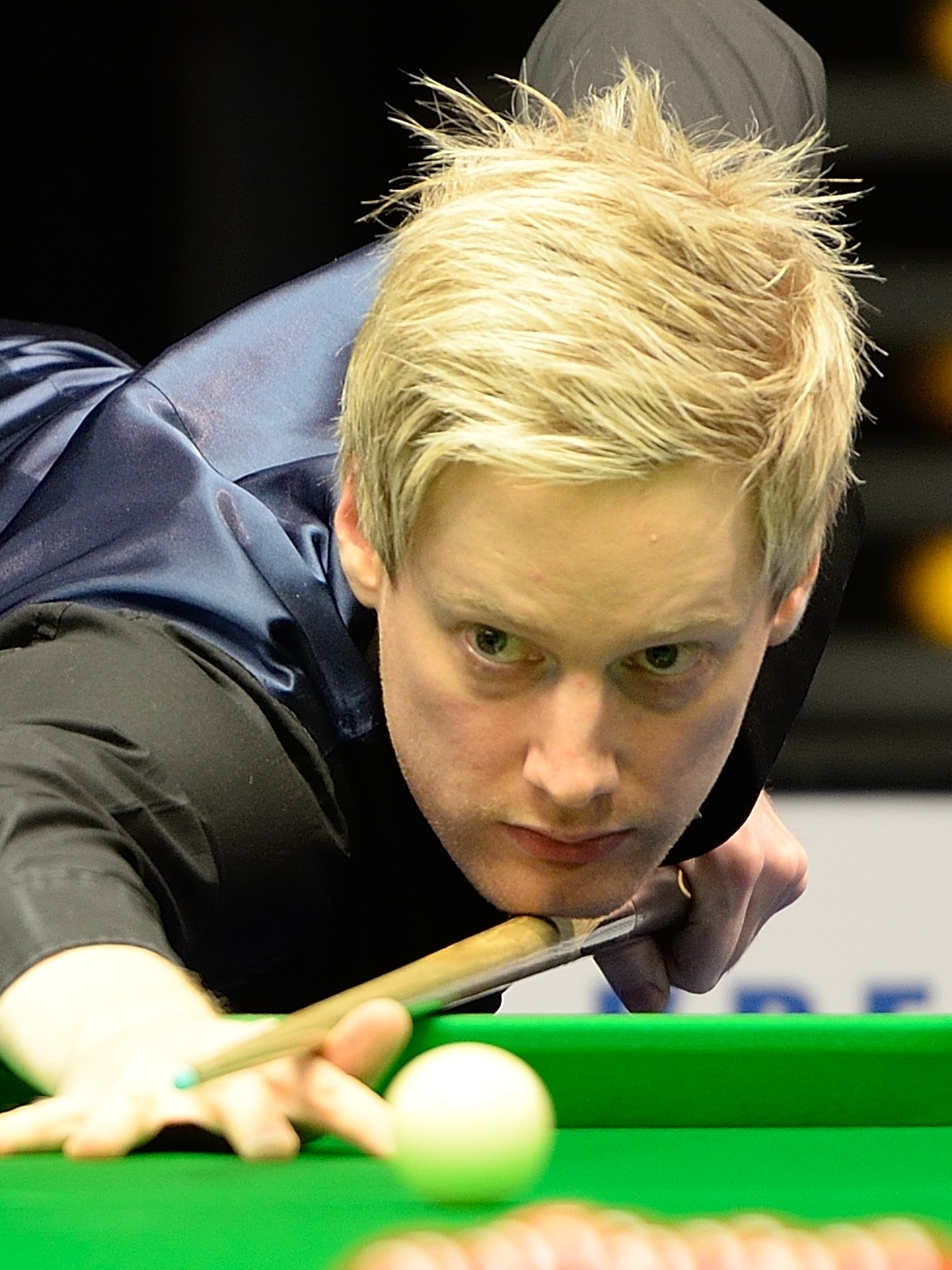
Neil Robertson (pictured in 2015) ousted defending champion Ronnie O'Sullivan in the semi-finals.

The semi-finals were played on 17 January as the best-of-11 frames. In his match against O'Sullivan, Robertson took the opening frame with a century break and then the second one, in which a break of 66 was enough to neutralize the 63 made by O'Sullivan. He enlarged his lead to 3–0, although O'Sullivan, who had won fifteen consecutive matches up to that point, hit back with a century of his own in the fourth frame to go 1–3. Robertson advanced into the final winning another three frames on the trot, including breaks of 58 and 60. "[Neil] took me apart like someone of his ability and calibre would when they are comfortable with their game", said O'Sullivan afterwards.

In the other semi-final, Allen raced into a 2–0 lead against Murphy. Murphy, however, conceded no more frames in the match, winning six on the trot thanks to breaks of 80, 83, 72, 102 and 60.

=== Final ===
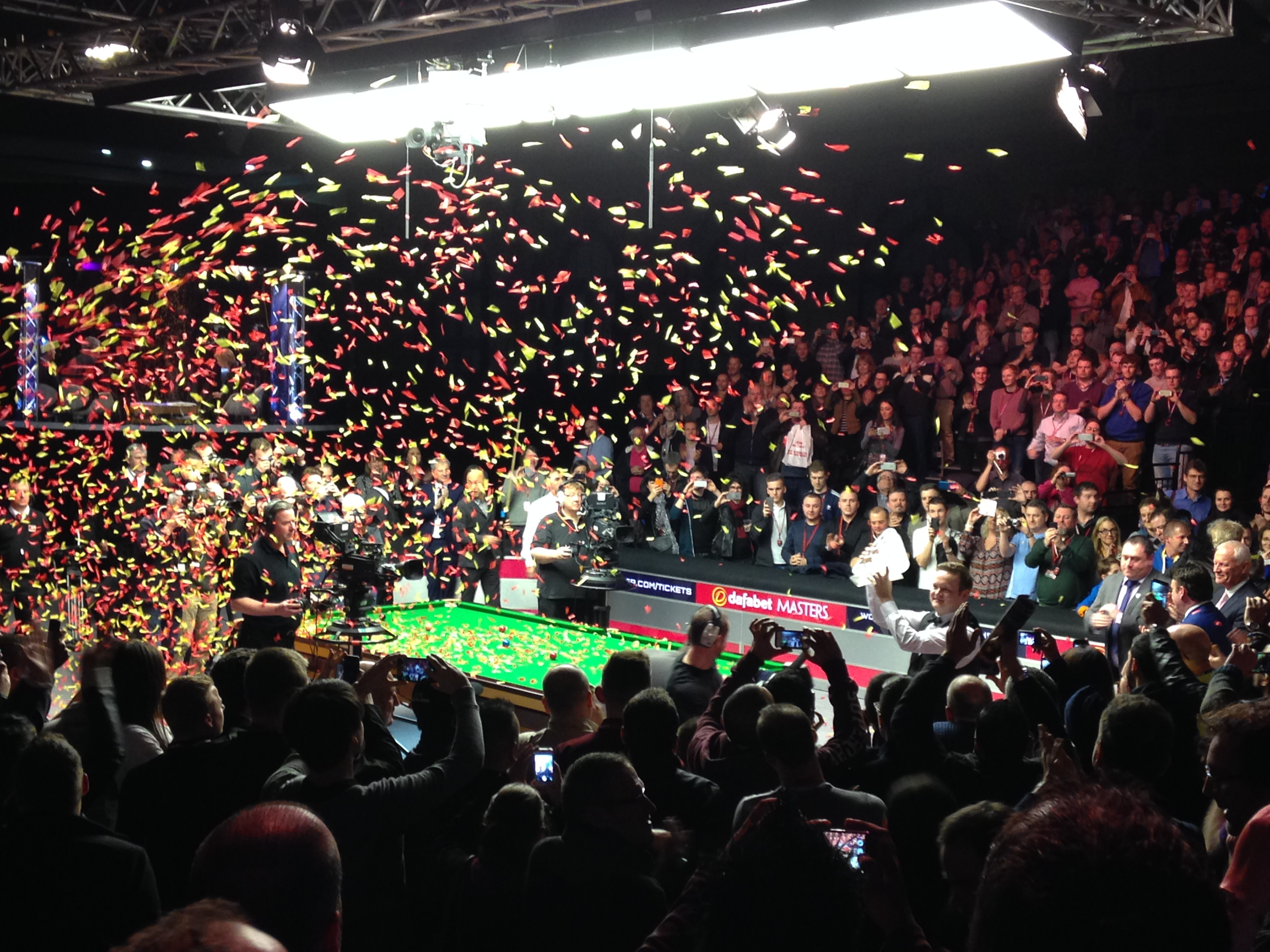
Shaun Murphy (pictured lifting the trophy of the event) won the final against Neil Robertson with a 10–2 result, the biggest winning margin since 1988.

The final was played as the best-of-19 frames, held over two sessions on 18 January, between Robertson and Murphy. The match was officiated by Brendan Moore. The two players had previously faced each other in the 2012 final, when Robertson had lifted the trophy with a 10–6 result. In the first session, played in the afternoon, Murphy won the first five frames of the match, with a 127 century in the third one. Robertson responded with a half-century of 80 in the sixth and both players shared the last two frames of the session to end it with a 6–2 score favourable to Murphy.

Even though Robertson compiled a break of 51 in the first frame of the evening session, Murphy took it by two points. He then followed it with a century of 127, which was described as "superb" by Shamoon Hafez writing for the BBC. Murphy also won the following frame and put himself only one away from victory. He closed the match with a 60 break and a 10–2 result. It was Murphy's first Masters title, and he collected £200,000 in prize money. It was the biggest winning margin in a Masters final since Steve Davis whitewashed Mike Hallett 9–0 in 1988. In winning the title, Murphy became the tenth player to win all Triple Crown events at least once, having previously been champion of the 2005 World Championship and the 2008 UK Championship. Robertson congratulated Murphy: "I just could not produce the sort of snooker that got me to the final. I'd just like to say welcome to the Triple Crown club. He is a worthy champion".

== Tournament draw ==
Last 16; Best of 11 frames
1	Ronnie O'Sullivan (ENG)	6
9	Ricky Walden (ENG)	4
8	Stuart Bingham (ENG)	3
10	Marco Fu (HKG)	6
5	Barry Hawkins (ENG)	1
13	Ali Carter (ENG)	6
4	Neil Robertson (AUS)	6
16	Robert Milkins (ENG)	4
3	Ding Junhui (CHN)	3
14	Joe Perry (ENG)	6
6	Mark Allen (NIR)	6
15	John Higgins (SCO)	4
7	Judd Trump (ENG)	4
12	Stephen Maguire (SCO)	6
2	Mark Selby (ENG)	5
11	Shaun Murphy (ENG)	6

Quarter-finals; Best of 11 frames
1	(England) Ronnie O'Sullivan	6
10	(Hong Kong) Marco Fu	1
13	(England) Ali Carter	1
4	(Australia) Neil Robertson	6
14	(England) Joe Perry	4
6	(Northern Ireland) Mark Allen	6
12	(Scotland) Stephen Maguire	4
11	(England) Shaun Murphy	6

Semi-finals; Best of 11 frames
1	(England) Ronnie O'Sullivan	1
4	(Australia) Neil Robertson	6
6	(Northern Ireland) Mark Allen	2
11	(England) Shaun Murphy	6

Final; Best of 19 frames
4	(Australia) Neil Robertson	2
11	(England) Shaun Murphy	10

=== Final ===
Final: Best of 19 frames. Referee: Brendan Moore. Alexandra Palace, London, England, 18 January 2015.
Neil Robertson (4); Australia	2–10	Shaun Murphy (11); England
Afternoon: 6–70 (64), 53–66, 0–127 (127), 24–77 (76), 32–80, 80–0 (80), 0–70 (69), 69–49; Evening: 55–57 (Robertson 51), 0–127 (127), 13–73, 7–83 (60)
80	Highest break	127
0	Century breaks	2
2	50+ breaks	6

== Century breaks ==
Total: 28

- 147, 103, 103 – Marco Fu
- 137 – Stephen Maguire
- 132, 120, 104 – John Higgins
- 130 – Ali Carter
- 128, 127, 117, 100 – Neil Robertson
- 127, 127, 103, 103, 102 – Shaun Murphy
- 121 – Mark Allen
- 120, 100 – Mark Selby
- 116, 101, 101, 100 – Ronnie O'Sullivan
- 109 – Judd Trump
- 104, 104 – Joe Perry
- 100 – Ricky Walden
