= Snooker 19 =

Snooker video game

- Developer: Lab42
- Publisher: Ripstone Games
- Platforms: Microsoft Windows; Nintendo Switch; PlayStation 4; Xbox One
- Release: Microsoft Windows, PlayStation 4, Xbox One: WW: 17 April 2019; Nintendo Switch: WW: 23 August 2019
- Genre: Sports
- Modes: Single-player, multiplayer

Snooker 19 is a 2019 sports video game developed by Lab42 and published by Ripstone Games. The game is a simulation of the game of snooker. The game was released on 17 April 2019 for Microsoft Windows, PlayStation 4 and Xbox One, with a Nintendo Switch release on 23 August 2019. All 128 professional players from the World Snooker Tour during the 2018-19 snooker season appear in the game, as do venues from all 26 tournaments, including Alexandra Palace and the Crucible Theatre.

== Gameplay ==
Snooker 19 includes all officially licensed tournaments from the 2018–19 snooker season and the Q School qualification events for the main tour. It features single-player, multiplayer and online multiplayer modes. The game featured full likenesses for all 128 professional players on the World Snooker Tour, in-game commentary by Neal Foulds, and David Hendon, and refereeing by Brendan Moore. Multiplayer matches mirror real-life tournaments, with in-game tournaments co-existing with events.

Games of snooker can be played with the traditional 15-reds, the six-red snooker variant, and with rules from the Snooker Shoot Out with matches lasting a maximum of ten minutes and a shot clock. Through winning matches offline and online, players can unlock new shirts, waistcoats and bowties for the on-screen players. In the game's career mode, the "pro seasons" options allows players to compete as top professionals, whilst "rising stars" is for players to start with no ranking points.

== Release ==
Prior to the release of Snooker 19, Joanne Williams (wife of reigning World Champion Mark Williams) accused the game of "massive prejudice" as the game's cover art did not feature Williams. Williams suggested that this might be because he was 40 years old and Welsh. This led to fans imposing pictures of Williams from a naked press conference he had taken over the cover art for the release.

Snooker 19 was released on 17 April 2019 for Microsoft Windows, PlayStation 4 and Xbox One. The Nintendo Switch version came out on 23 August 2019. A mobile port was released in August 2020 under the title WST Snooker. A "Challenge Pack DLC" for the game was released containing set specific shots to recreate, trick shots and snooker escapes in January 2020.

In April 2020, a Virtual Snooker World Championship took place, contested by the top 16 players on the PS4 version of the game. The matches were released on the official World Snooker Tour YouTube channel, with each player representing a real-life pro in the tournament.

== Reception ==
Snooker 19 received "mixed or average" reviews according to critical aggregator website Metacritic. It received a score of 70/100 based on eight critical reviews. The game's physics was praised as a realistic representation of snooker.

However, the game was less well received for its lack of variety. The game also felt dated graphically. The Official Xbox Magazine stated that it was a "faithful sim that overcomes bland presentation thanks to fabulous potting".
