= Brendan Moore (snooker referee) =

Snooker referee

Personal information
- Born: 17 February 1972 (age 54) Sheffield, England

Sport
- Country: England
- Sport: Snooker
- Professional: 2002-2023

Brendan Moore (born 17 February 1972, in Sheffield) is an English former professional snooker referee.

== Career ==
Moore first refereed on the World Snooker Tour in 2005. Moore took charge of three World Snooker Championship finals, in 2014, 2018, and 2023. He was also the referee in the 2010 and 2013 UK Championship finals, as well as the 2012, 2015 and 2020 Masters finals.

Moore has been in charge of ten tournament matches that have contained maximum breaks. The last before his retirement was by Mark Selby at the 2023 World Snooker Championship final, the first ever in a World Championship final. He was also the referee featured in the video game Snooker 19.

Following the 2023 World Snooker Championship final, Moore retired from snooker to become tournament director for Matchroom Pool.

== Personal life ==
Brendan is a football fan and follows Sheffield Wednesday. He is also a huge fan of American Football, in particular Miami Dolphins. He also enjoys cinema and spending time with his granddaughter.
