= 2007 Masters (snooker) =

Professional non-ranking snooker tournament, Jan 2007

2007 SAGA Insurance Masters

Tournament information
- Dates: 14–21 January 2007
- Venue: Wembley Arena
- City: London
- Country: England
- Organisation: WPBSA
- Format: Non-ranking event
- Winner's share: £130,000
- Highest break: Ding Junhui (CHN) (147)

Final
- Champion: Ronnie O'Sullivan (ENG)
- Runner-up: Ding Junhui (CHN)
- Score: 10–3

The 2007 Masters (officially the 2007 SAGA Insurance Masters) was a professional non-ranking snooker tournament that took place from 14 to 21 January 2007 at the Wembley Arena in London, England. It was the 33rd edition of the tournament. In a slight change for 2007, there were 19 competitors, as opposed to 18 up until 2006. The top 16 seeds for ranking events were automatically invited, while the other players entered a qualifying tournament for the right to one of three wild-card places. The two remaining places were granted by the game's governing body at their discretion to Jimmy White and Ding Junhui. Stuart Bingham won the qualifying tournament.

Ronnie O'Sullivan won his third Masters title by defeating Ding Junhui 10–3 in the final. With a noticeably partisan crowd, a visibly upset Ding went to shake O'Sullivan's hand after the latter won the 12th frame to go 9–3 in front, apparently believing that the match was over. The two walked arm-in-arm out of the arena. After O'Sullivan clinched the match in the following frame, it later transpired that Ding had indeed believed the match was best-of-17 frames.

== Field ==
Defending champion John Higgins was the number 1 seed with World Champion Graeme Dott seeded 2. Places were allocated to the top 16 players in the world rankings. Players seeded 14, 15 and 16 played in the wild-card round against the winner of the qualifying event, Stuart Bingham (ranked 24), and two wild-card selections, Ding Junhui (ranked 27) and Jimmy White (ranked 34). This was the only time that there were three matches in the wild-card round. Barry Hawkins was making his debut in the Masters.

== Prize fund ==
The breakdown of prize money for this year is shown below:

=== Qualifying stage ===
- Winner: £2,000
- Runner-up: £680
- Semi-final: £250
- Quarter-final: £105
- Total: £3,600

=== Televised stage ===
- Winner: £130,000
- Runner-up: £62,000
- Semi-final: £32,000
- Quarter-final: £16,000
- Last 16: £12,000
- Last 18 (seeded): £12,000
- Last 18 (wild-cards): £2,000
- Highest break: £10,000
- Maximum break: £25,000

== Wild-card round ==
In the preliminary "wild-card round", the three wild-card players were drawn against the players seeded 14th, 15th and 16th: During the course of his match against Anthony Hamilton, Ding Junhui became the 28th and youngest ever player to score a maximum 147 break on live television. Aged 19 years and 288 days, he broke the previous record set by Ronnie O'Sullivan in 1997 who was then 21 years and 137 days old. This was also just the second maximum in the history of the Masters.

Match	Date		Score	
WC1	Sunday 14 January	Matthew Stevens (WAL) (14)	6–1	Jimmy White (ENG)
WC2	Sunday 14 January	Ali Carter (ENG) (15)	6–5	Stuart Bingham (ENG)
WC3	Sunday 14 January	Anthony Hamilton (ENG) (16)	3–6	Ding Junhui (CHN)

== Main draw ==
Last 16; Best of 11 frames
1	John Higgins (SCO)	5
9	Stephen Maguire (SCO)	6
8	Mark Williams (WAL)	0
13	Neil Robertson (AUS)	6
5	Ronnie O'Sullivan (ENG)	6
15	Ali Carter (ENG)	1
4	Ken Doherty (IRL)	6
12	Barry Hawkins (ENG)	3
3	Stephen Hendry (SCO)	6
14	Matthew Stevens (WAL)	5
6	Shaun Murphy (ENG)	6
11	Steve Davis (ENG)	3
7	Peter Ebdon (ENG)	3
Ding Junhui (CHN)	6
2	Graeme Dott (SCO)	2
10	Stephen Lee (ENG)	6

Quarter-finals; Best of 11 frames
9	(Scotland) Stephen Maguire	6
13	(Australia) Neil Robertson	2
5	(England) Ronnie O'Sullivan	6
4	(Republic of Ireland) Ken Doherty	5
3	(Scotland) Stephen Hendry	6
6	(England) Shaun Murphy	3
(China) Ding Junhui	6
10	(England) Stephen Lee	2

Semi-finals; Best of 11 frames
9	(Scotland) Stephen Maguire	4
5	(England) Ronnie O'Sullivan	6
3	(Scotland) Stephen Hendry	2
(China) Ding Junhui	6

Final; Best of 19 frames
5	(England) Ronnie O'Sullivan	10
(China) Ding Junhui	3

== Final ==
Final: Best of 19 frames. Referee: Jan Verhaas. Wembley Arena, London, England, 21 January 2007.
Ronnie O'Sullivan (5); England	10–3	Ding Junhui; China
Afternoon: 1–77 (77), 16–109 (109), 62–1 (55), 99–22 (99), 128–0 (128), 101–37 (101), 64–72 (O'Sullivan 58), 116–4 (116); Evening: 96–0 (96), 66–65 (66, 65), 143–11 (143), 97–0, 121–12 (74)
143	Highest break	109
4	Century breaks	1
10	50+ breaks	3

== Qualifying ==
The 2006 Masters Qualifying Event were held between 4 and 9 November 2006 at the English Institute of Sport in Sheffield, England. The winner of this series of matches, who qualified for the tournament, was Stuart Bingham.

Last 64; Best of 7 frames
(Wales) Ryan Day
Bye
(England) Matthew Couch	4
(China) Liu Song	2
(Northern Ireland) Gerard Greene	4
(England) James Leadbetter	2
(England) Lee Spick	3
(New Zealand) Dene O'Kane	4
(England) Barry Pinches	4
(United Arab Emirates) Mohammed Shehab	3
(Scotland) Jamie Burnett	4
(Republic of Ireland) David Morris	3
(England) David Gray
Bye
(England) Judd Trump	4
(England) Andrew Higginson	2
(England) Stuart Bingham
Bye
(England) Jamie Cope	w/d
(England) Paul Davison	w/o
(England) Mark King
Bye
(Northern Ireland) Mark Allen	4
(Scotland) Robert Stephen	1
(England) Ricky Walden	4
(China) Tian Pengfei	1
(England) David Roe	0
(Malta) Alex Borg	4
(England) Michael Holt
Bye
(England) Chris Norbury	4
(Germany) Patrick Einsle	1
(England) Nigel Bond
Bye
(Scotland) Marcus Campbell	3
(England) Mark Joyce	4
(Northern Ireland) Joe Swail
Bye
(England) Tom Ford	w/o
(England) Alfie Burden	w/d
(England) Mark Selby
Bye
(Finland) Robin Hull	1
(England) Ben Woollaston	4
(England) Ian McCulloch
Bye
(England) Joe Jogia	1
(Thailand) Passakorn Suwannawat	4
(Hong Kong) Marco Fu
Bye
(Wales) Paul Davies	4
(Wales) Jamie Jones	0
(Republic of Ireland) Michael Judge	2
(Thailand) Issara Kachaiwong	4
(England) Jimmy Michie	2
(England) Jeff Cundy	4
(England) Dave Harold	4
(England) Sean Storey	1
(England) Andrew Norman	4
(England) Lee Page	0
(England) Joe Perry
Bye
(Republic of Ireland) Fergal O'Brien	1
(China) Liang Wenbo	4

Last 32; Best of 9 frames
(Wales) Ryan Day	5
(England) Matthew Couch	2
(Northern Ireland) Gerard Greene	5
(New Zealand) Dene O'Kane	4
(England) Barry Pinches	5
(Scotland) Jamie Burnett	4
(England) David Gray	5
(England) Judd Trump	4
(England) Stuart Bingham	5
(England) Paul Davison	1
(England) Mark King	5
(Northern Ireland) Mark Allen	4
(England) Ricky Walden	5
(Malta) Alex Borg	3
(England) Michael Holt	5
(England) Chris Norbury	0
(England) Nigel Bond	5
(England) Mark Joyce	3
(Northern Ireland) Joe Swail	5
(England) Tom Ford	1
(England) Mark Selby	5
(England) Ben Woollaston	3
(England) Ian McCulloch	5
(Thailand) Passakorn Suwannawat	0
(Hong Kong) Marco Fu	5
(Wales) Paul Davies	0
(Thailand) Issara Kachaiwong	5
(England) Jeff Cundy	4
(England) Dave Harold	3
(England) Andrew Norman	5
(England) Joe Perry	3
(China) Liang Wenbo	5

Last 16; Best of 9 frames
(Wales) Ryan Day	5
(Northern Ireland) Gerard Greene	3
(England) Barry Pinches	2
(England) David Gray	5
(England) Stuart Bingham	5
(England) Mark King	1
(England) Ricky Walden	1
(England) Michael Holt	5
(England) Nigel Bond	2
(Northern Ireland) Joe Swail	5
(England) Mark Selby	5
(England) Ian McCulloch	3
(Hong Kong) Marco Fu	5
(Thailand) Issara Kachaiwong	0
(England) Andrew Norman	2
(China) Liang Wenbo	5

Quarter-finals; Best of 9 frames
(Wales) Ryan Day	2
(England) David Gray	5
(England) Stuart Bingham	5
(England) Michael Holt	3
(Northern Ireland) Joe Swail	0
(England) Mark Selby	5
(Hong Kong) Marco Fu	5
(China) Liang Wenbo	4

Semi-finals; Best of 9 frames
(England) David Gray	2
(England) Stuart Bingham	5
(England) Mark Selby	5
(Hong Kong) Marco Fu	2

Final; Best of 11 frames
(England) Stuart Bingham	6
(England) Mark Selby	2

== Century breaks ==
=== Televised stage centuries ===
Total: 26

- 147, 128, 109, 108, 105, 105, 104 – Ding Junhui
- 143, 130, 128, 117, 116, 115, 106, 101 – Ronnie O'Sullivan
- 129 – Stephen Hendry
- 127 – Ken Doherty
- 126, 102 – Neil Robertson
- 116 – Stephen Maguire
- 105, 103, 103 – Matthew Stevens
- 103 – Anthony Hamilton
- 103 – Ali Carter
- 100 – Stephen Lee

=== Qualifying stage centuries ===
- 137, 124, 103 – Marco Fu
- 137 – Michael Holt
- 131 – Dene O'Kane
- 129, 112 – Barry Pinches
- 127, 123, 121, 116, 114, 106 – Mark Selby
- 118, 110, 104, 102 – Stuart Bingham
- 118 – Mark King
- 116 – Joe Perry
- 105, 104 – David Gray
- 104 – Jeff Cundy
- 104 – Judd Trump
- 103 – Liang Wenbo
- 102 – Michael Judge
- 100 – Ian McCulloch
