= 2012 Masters (snooker) =

Professional non-ranking snooker tournament, Jan 2012

2012 BGC Masters

Tournament information
- Dates: 15–22 January 2012
- Venue: Alexandra Palace
- City: London
- Country: England
- Organisation: World Snooker
- Format: Non-ranking event
- Total prize fund: £500,000
- Winner's share: £150,000
- Highest break: Ronnie O'Sullivan (ENG) (141)

Final
- Champion: Neil Robertson (AUS)
- Runner-up: Shaun Murphy (ENG)
- Score: 10–6

The 2012 Masters (officially the 2012 BGC Masters) was a professional non-ranking snooker tournament held between 15 and 22 January 2012 at the Alexandra Palace in London, England. This was the first time that Stephen Hendry didn't participate at the Masters since his début in 1989, and the first time that BGC Partners sponsored the event.

Ding Junhui was the defending champion, but he lost in the first round 4–6 against Ronnie O'Sullivan. Ronnie O'Sullivan made the highest break of the tournament in the second round against Judd Trump, making a 141.

Neil Robertson won his first Masters title by defeating Shaun Murphy 10–6 in the final. This was Robertson's 10th professional title and his second Triple Crown title after winning the 2010 World Snooker Championship.

== Field ==
Defending champion Ding Junhui was the number 1 seed with World Champion John Higgins seeded 2. The remaining places were allocated to players based on the latest world rankings (revision 2). Martin Gould was making his debut in the Masters.

== Prize fund ==
The breakdown of prize money for this year is shown below:

- Winner: £150,000
- Runner-up: £75,000
- Semi-finals: £30,000
- Quarter-finals: £20,000
- Last 16: £15,000
- Highest break: £15,000
- Total: £500,000

== Main draw ==
Last 16; Best of 11 frames
1	Ding Junhui (CHN)	4
14	Ronnie O'Sullivan (ENG)	6
8	Judd Trump (ENG)	6
11	Stuart Bingham (ENG)	3
5	Neil Robertson (AUS)	6
12	Mark Allen (NIR)	3
4	Mark Williams (WAL)	6
9	Stephen Maguire (SCO)	4
3	Mark Selby (ENG)	6
13	Stephen Lee (ENG)	4
6	Shaun Murphy (ENG)	6
16	Martin Gould (ENG)	2
7	Ali Carter (ENG)	3
10	Graeme Dott (SCO)	6
2	John Higgins (SCO)	6
15	Matthew Stevens (WAL)	2

Quarter-finals; Best of 11 frames
14	(England) Ronnie O'Sullivan	2
8	(England) Judd Trump	6
5	(Australia) Neil Robertson	6
4	(Wales) Mark Williams	4
3	(England) Mark Selby	2
6	(England) Shaun Murphy	6
10	(Scotland) Graeme Dott	3
2	(Scotland) John Higgins	6

Semi-finals; Best of 11 frames
8	(England) Judd Trump	3
5	(Australia) Neil Robertson	6
6	(England) Shaun Murphy	6
2	(Scotland) John Higgins	4

Final; Best of 19 frames
5	(Australia) Neil Robertson	10
6	(England) Shaun Murphy	6

== Final ==
Final: Best of 19 frames. Referee: Brendan Moore; Alexandra Palace, London, England, 22 January 2012
Neil Robertson (5); Australia	10–6	Shaun Murphy (6); England
Afternoon: 61–57, 30–93 (65), 7–116 (102), 120–6 (103), 74–37, 25–60 (53), 72–0 (72), 72–48 (60); Evening: 21–79, 101–32 (101), 57–14, 80–9 (76), 76–23 (76), 0–85 (52), 0–86 (86), 109–0 (70)
103	Highest break	102
2	Century breaks	1
7	50+ breaks	5

== Century breaks ==
Total: 21

- 141, 125 – Ronnie O'Sullivan
- 140, 121, 107 – Judd Trump
- 139, 122, 107, 102, 101, 100 – Shaun Murphy
- 124 – Mark Allen
- 119, 103, 101, 100, 100 – Neil Robertson
- 112, 110 – Mark Selby
- 109 – John Higgins
- 100 – Stephen Lee
