= 2022 World Mixed Doubles =

- 2022 Badminton World Federation World Tour - mixed doubles
- 2022 World Mixed Doubles Curling Championship
- 2022 World Mixed Doubles (snooker)
