= 2023–24 snooker world rankings =

Preceded by 2022–23	2023–24	Succeeded by 2024–25

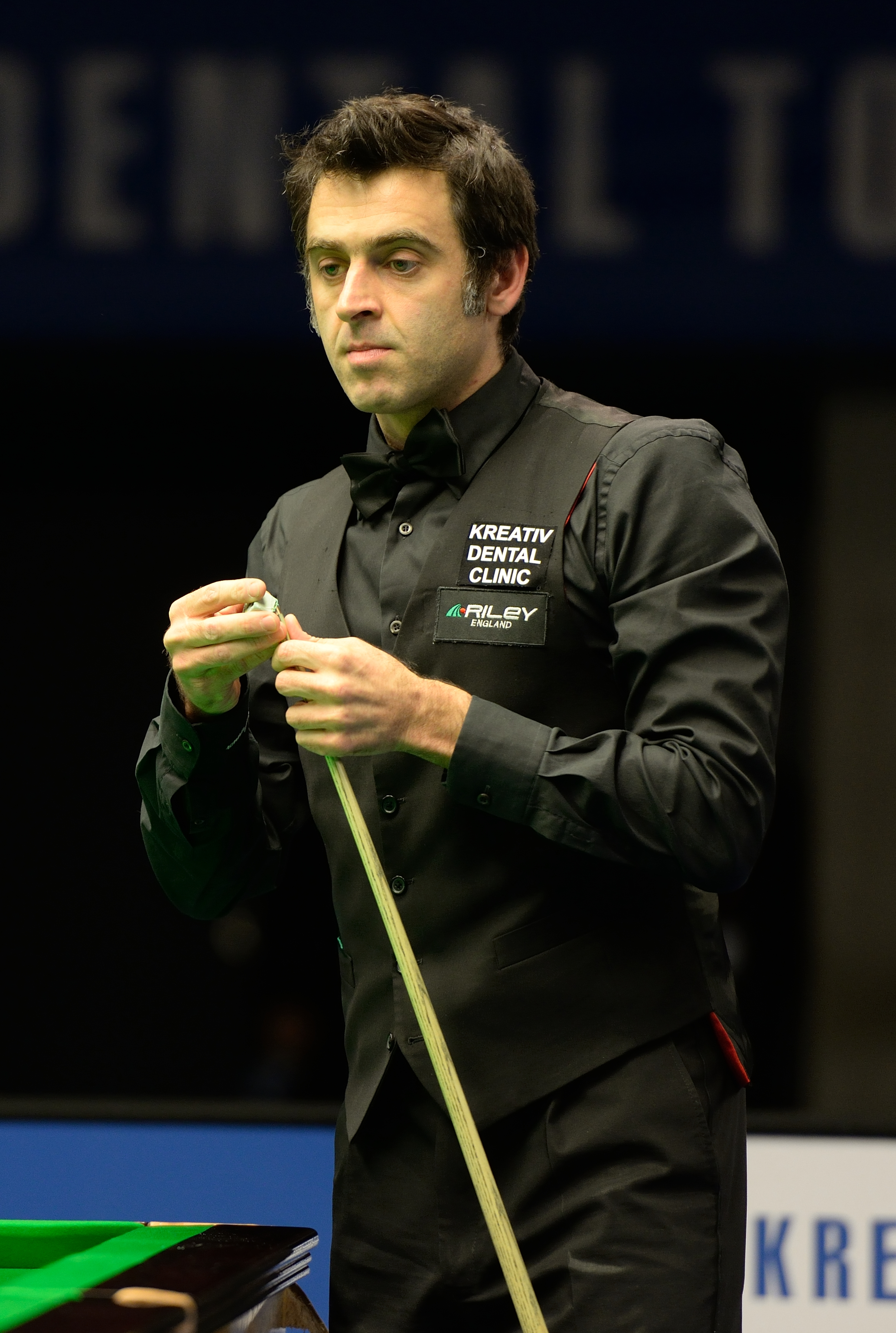
Ronnie O'Sullivan (pictured above) started the season as the highest ranked player, but was replaced with Mark Allen (pictured below) by the end of the season.

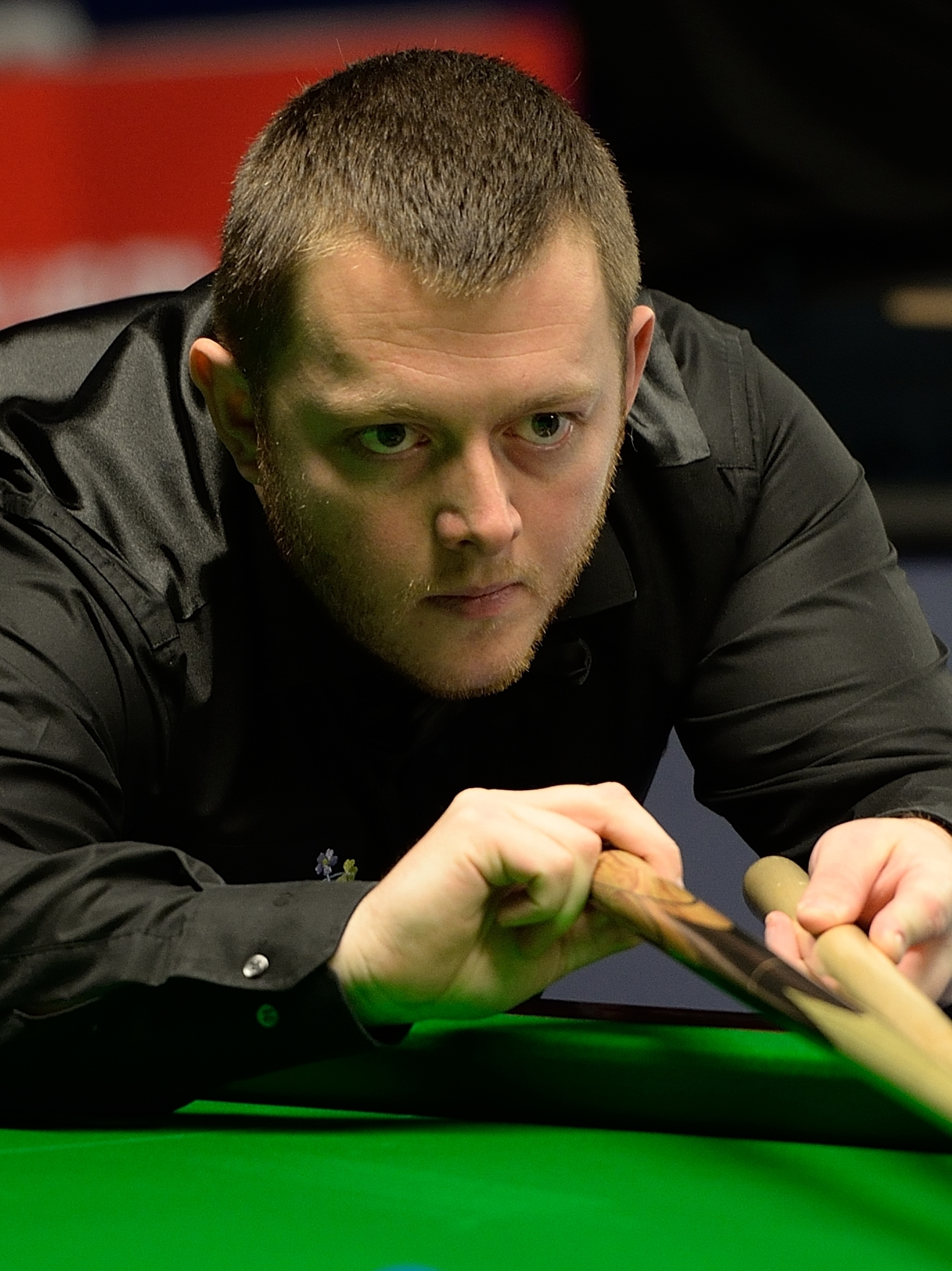

The sport of professional snooker has had a world ranking system in place since 1976. Certain tournaments were given "ranking" status, with the results at those events contributing to a player's world ranking. The events that made up the 1976–77 snooker season were the first to award players with ranking points. Originally, the world rankings were decided based only on results in the World Snooker Championship, but other events were later added. The system used for the 2023–24 snooker season was first used in the 2010–11 season, where players won ranking points based entirely on prize money won from these events. The rankings are based on the prior two seasons, with eight revisions after specific tournaments throughout the season. These revisions are used as official rankings, with points awarded in the current season overwriting those from two years prior.

Ronnie O'Sullivan began the season as the highest ranked player; however, Mark Allen became world number one after the 2024 World Snooker Championship. Allen finished the season with a lead of 54,000 points over Judd Trump.

== Revision dates and seeding cut-offs ==
The world rankings are updated at specific revision dates following each ranking tournament. On these dates, the ranking points from the latest 2023–24 season ranking event are added, while those from two years ago in the 2021–22 snooker season are removed from a player's total. The revision dates are also used for seeding of following ranking events.

Revision point	Date	2023/24 points added	2021/22 points dropped	Seeding cut-off for 2023/24 event
1	22 July 2023	Championship League	Championship League	British Open, Shanghai Masters
2	28 August 2023	European Masters	British Open	English Open, Wuhan Open, International Championship
3	2 October 2023	British Open	–	–
4	9 October 2023	English Open	–	Northern Ireland Open
5	16 October 2023	Wuhan Open	Northern Ireland Open	Scottish Open
6	30 October 2023	Northern Ireland Open	English Open	–
7	13 November 2023	International Championship	–	UK Championship, Shoot Out
8	4 December 2023	UK Championship	UK Championship	Masters
9	10 December 2023	Shoot Out	Scottish Open	German Masters
10	18 December 2023	Scottish Open	World Grand Prix	World Grand Prix (Note: A one-year list is used instead, which only include the ranking points the players have earned so far in the 2023/24 season.), Welsh Open, World Open
11	22 January 2024	World Grand Prix	Shoot Out	–
12	5 February 2024	German Masters	German Masters	–
13	19 February 2024	Welsh Open	Players Championship	Players Championship, World Mixed Doubles
14	26 February 2024	Players Championship	European Masters, Welsh Open	World Masters of Snooker
15	25 March 2024	World Open	Turkish Masters, Gibraltar Open	Tour Championship
16	8 Apr 2024	Tour Championship	Tour Championship	World Championship
17	7 May 2024	World Championship	World Championship	–

== Ranking list ==
This table contains the rankings after each revision points, which were used to determine the seedings for subsequent tournaments. Blank fields indicate that the player was not active on the tour. New players on tour had no rankings at the start of the 2023–24 season, which are shown as revision 0. The list is initially sorted by the latest rankings.

Name	Seeding revisions																	
Name	0 (Note: Seeding revision 0 was used for the seeding of the Championship League and the European Masters.)	1 (Note: Seeding revision 1 was used for the seeding of the British Open and the Shanghai Masters.)	2 (Note: Seeding revision 2 was used for the seeding of the English Open, Wuhan Open, and the International Championship.)	3	4 (Note: Seeding revision 4 was used for the seeding of the Northern Ireland Open.)	5 (Note: Seeding revision 5 was used for the seeding of the Scottish Open.)	6	7 (Note: Seeding revision 7 was used for the seeding of the UK Championship and the Snooker Shoot Out.)	8 (Note: Seeding revision 8 was used for the seeding of the Masters.)	9 (Note: Seeding revision 9 was used for the seeding of the German Masters.)	10 (Note: Seeding revision 10 was used for the seeding of the World Grand Prix, Welsh Open, and the World Open.)	11	12	13 (Note: Seeding revision 13 was used for the seeding of the Players Championship and the World Mixed Doubles.)	14 (Note: Seeding revision 14 was used for the seeding of the World Masters of Snooker.)	15 (Note: Seeding revision 15 was used for the seeding of the Tour Championship.)	16 (Note: Seeding revision 16 was used for the seeding of the World Championship.)	17
Mark Allen (NIR)	3	3	3	3	3	4	4	4	4	3	3	3	3	3	3	3	3	1
Judd Trump (ENG)	4	4	4	5	4	3	3	2	2	2	2	2	2	2	2	2	2	2
Kyren Wilson (ENG)	8	8	8	8	8	8	8	8	9	9	9	10	9	10	11	12	12	3
Luca Brecel (BEL)	2	2	2	2	2	2	2	3	3	4	4	4	4	4	4	4	4	4
Ronnie O'Sullivan (ENG)	1	1	1	1	1	1	1	1	1	1	1	1	1	1	1	1	1	5
Mark Selby (ENG)	5	5	5	4	5	5	5	5	5	5	5	5	5	5	5	5	5	6
Shaun Murphy (ENG)	7	7	7	7	7	7	7	7	7	7	6	6	6	6	6	6	8	7
Ding Junhui (CHN)	17	15	15	16	15	15	16	17	12	11	11	9	11	9	9	7	7	8
Mark Williams (WAL)	10	9	10	9	10	9	9	9	8	8	8	8	8	7	7	8	6	9
Ali Carter (ENG)	12	11	11	11	11	11	11	10	11	10	10	11	10	8	8	9	9	10
Gary Wilson (ENG)	15	14	18	18	18	18	18	20	20	20	17	16	16	12	13	12	10	11
Zhang Anda (CHN)	60	58	55	56	40	39	37	15	13	13	13	13	13	13	12	11	11	12
Tom Ford (ENG)	24	22	20	20	20	19	19	16	18	18	18	18	18	16	16	15	14	13
Jak Jones (WAL)	37	35	35	36	36	38	38	39	42	41	41	43	43	42	40	44	44	14
Barry Hawkins (ENG)	20	19	13	14	14	14	13	12	15	15	15	15	15	19	18	16	15	15
John Higgins (SCO)	9	10	9	10	9	10	10	11	10	12	12	12	12	11	10	10	13	16
Robert Milkins (ENG)	13	12	12	12	12	12	14	14	14	14	14	14	14	14	14	17	16	17
Ryan Day (WAL)	16	17	16	17	17	17	17	19	19	19	20	19	19	18	19	19	18	18
Jack Lisowski (ENG)	14	13	14	13	13	13	12	13	16	16	16	17	17	17	17	18	17	19
Si Jiahui (CHN)	36	33	30	31	31	30	31	32	31	28	28	29	24	24	24	24	23	20
Hossein Vafaei (IRN)	18	16	17	15	16	16	15	18	17	17	19	20	20	20	21	20	19	21
David Gilbert (ENG)	21	23	25	24	23	26	26	28	30	31	32	32	32	33	32	31	31	22
Zhou Yuelong (CHN)	27	25	26	28	25	22	24	25	22	21	21	21	21	21	20	22	21	23
Chris Wakelin (ENG)	31	28	26	26	26	25	21	22	23	22	23	23	23	23	22	21	20	24
Stuart Bingham (ENG)	25	21	22	21	22	21	23	23	26	25	26	26	27	28	27	29	29	25
Noppon Saengkham (THA)	29	26	23	23	24	22	22	24	24	26	22	22	22	22	23	23	22	26
Pang Junxu (CHN)	35	34	34	35	35	35	34	34	32	33	31	31	30	29	29	27	27	27
Neil Robertson (AUS)	6	6	6	6	6	6	6	6	6	6	7	7	7	15	15	14	24	28
Joe O'Connor (ENG)	33	31	33	33	33	34	34	38	36	36	35	35	35	32	30	30	30	29
Lyu Haotian (CHN)	46	44	39	40	41	36	36	36	35	35	30	28	31	31	28	26	26	30
Stephen Maguire (SCO)	32	30	32	32	32	32	30	27	27	29	34	34	34	34	31	28	28	31
Anthony McGill (SCO)	19	18	19	19	19	20	19	21	21	23	24	24	25	25	25	25	25	32
Ricky Walden (ENG)	22	20	20	22	21	24	24	25	25	24	25	25	28	36	35	32	32	33
Xiao Guodong (CHN)	43	38	37	34	34	33	33	35	37	38	38	38	38	37	34	34	34	34
Cao Yupeng (CHN)	42	40	43	45	44	46	46	46	49	43	43	39	41	40	38	37	37	35
Robbie Williams (ENG)	50	47	47	46	47	51	50	49	48	48	47	51	51	51	46	45	45	36
Matthew Selt (ENG)	30	29	29	30	29	28	28	29	29	30	29	30	28	26	26	35	35	37
Yuan Sijun (CHN)	52	51	50	50	48	45	41	43	41	39	39	40	39	38	37	37	37	38
Wu Yize (CHN)	51	50	48	48	49	37	39	41	43	44	44	44	44	43	41	42	42	39
Dominic Dale (WAL)	63	59	58	56	56	54	53	53	55	54	49	48	49	48	43	40	40	40
Jamie Jones (WAL)	45	43	45	44	44	43	45	45	39	42	40	41	42	41	39	41	41	41
Elliot Slessor (ENG)	49	48	57	58	57	58	57	55	52	50	51	51	50	44	42	36	36	42
Thepchaiya Un-Nooh (THA)	39	36	36	37	37	39	42	40	38	37	37	37	36	35	33	32	32	43
Jordan Brown (NIR)	38	39	40	41	42	44	43	37	40	40	42	42	40	39	36	39	39	44
Jackson Page (WAL)	48	49	49	51	52	52	52	52	50	51	53	53	52	53	52	43	43	45
Sam Craigie (ENG)	52	44	46	47	51	50	47	47	50	52	51	50	47	49	44	46	46	46
Joe Perry (ENG)	28	27	24	25	27	27	26	29	27	27	27	27	26	27	48	47	47	47
Matthew Stevens (WAL)	44	42	43	42	43	48	48	48	45	45	45	45	45	47	46	48	48	48
Jimmy Robertson (ENG)	26	24	28	27	28	29	29	31	34	34	36	36	37	45	45	49	49	49
Fan Zhengyi (CHN)	34	32	31	29	30	31	32	33	33	32	32	33	33	30	54	51	51	50
Scott Donaldson (SCO)	54	52	51	49	50	49	51	50	44	48	47	47	48	50	49	50	50	51
Tian Pengfei (CHN)	55	53	52	52	53	53	54	54	58	58	58	58	58	56	56	55	55	52
Anthony Hamilton (ENG)	39	36	38	38	39	42	44	44	46	47	49	49	53	52	51	52	52	53
Graeme Dott (SCO)	41	41	42	39	38	41	40	42	47	46	46	46	45	46	50	54	54	54
Michael White (WAL)	78	66	66	66	66	66	65	65	63	61	62	62	62	63	62	60	60	55
Ben Woollaston (ENG)	46	44	41	43	46	47	49	51	53	55	57	57	55	57	60	58	58	56
Mark Davis (ENG)	68	65	65	65	65	64	64	63	60	60	60	60	60	60	61	64	64	57
Xu Si (CHN)	66	62	61	62	62	61	61	61	59	59	59	59	55	57	58	56	56	58
Jamie Clarke (WAL)	58	55	53	55	58	55	59	60	54	53	54	54	54	54	53	53	53	59
Aaron Hill (IRL)	94	73	74	75	76	67	66	66	66	66	66	66	66	65	64	62	62	60
David Grace (ENG)	56	54	55	54	55	59	58	56	57	57	56	56	58	59	57	57	57	61
Sanderson Lam (ENG)	97	72	73	70	69	68	68	67	69	69	64	64	65	67	66	63	63	62
Martin O'Donnell (ENG)		93	96	101	86	82	82	82	79	79	77	77	75	60	59	59	59	63
David Lilley (ENG)	82	69	70	71	70	72	73	74	71	71	72	72	70	71	70	66	66	64
Julien Leclercq (BEL)	79	68	69	68	68	70	67	69	68	68	67	67	64	65	64	67	67	65
He Guoqiang (CHN)		118	118	88	83	76	77	77	78	78	79	79	75	76	76	72	72	66
Ashley Hugill (ENG)	79	70	67	67	67	69	69	70	70	70	70	70	72	74	74	69	69	67
Daniel Wells (WAL)		99	92	93	94	90	94	82	79	79	80	80	82	80	80	71	71	68
Oliver Lines (ENG)	61	61	61	61	59	60	60	59	56	56	55	55	57	55	55	61	61	69
Zak Surety (ENG)	101	78	77	77	78	80	78	78	76	76	75	75	71	72	71	72	72	70
Ben Mertens (BEL)	94	73	72	72	73	71	70	72	74	74	73	73	73	73	73	74	74	71
Andy Hicks (ENG)	59	57	53	53	54	56	54	57	65	64	65	65	67	68	69	75	75	72
Mark Joyce (ENG)	67	64	63	63	63	63	63	62	62	63	63	63	61	62	63	65	65	73
James Cahill (ENG)	91	71	71	73	72	74	71	73	72	72	71	71	74	75	75	76	76	74
Dylan Emery (WAL)	96	75	75	76	74	75	72	68	67	66	68	68	69	69	68	69	69	75
Lukas Kleckers (GER)	98	76	78	78	79	81	79	79	77	77	76	76	79	79	79	77	77	76
John Astley (ENG)	82	67	68	69	70	72	73	71	73	73	74	74	78	78	78	79	79	77
Liu Hongyu (CHN)		92	91	88	77	78	80	80	81	81	81	81	80	81	81	80	80	78
Ken Doherty (IRL)	98	76	76	74	75	77	76	76	75	75	77	77	75	76	76	78	78	79
Marco Fu (HKG)	108	118	118	121	121	112	107	90	88	89	89	89	86	83	83	83	83	80
Ashley Carty (ENG)		93	80	79	81	79	81	81	82	81	81	81	80	81	81	82	82	81
Liam Highfield (ENG)	57	56	59	59	60	57	56	58	61	61	61	61	63	64	67	68	68	82
Martin Gould (ENG)	62	60	60	60	60	62	62	64	64	65	68	68	68	70	72	81	81	83
Oliver Brown (ENG)	119	89	88	85	84	86	88	90	95	95	95	94	93	94	94	91	91	84
Louis Heathcote (ENG)	77	101	96	101	101	104	104	107	108	107	109	108	106	107	107	100	100	85
Stuart Carrington (ENG)	70	107	111	115	109	102	103	98	96	96	97	96	97	97	97	92	92	86
Allan Taylor (ENG)	108	79	79	80	80	83	84	85	84	84	84	84	84	84	84	84	84	87
Long Zehuang (CHN)		93	96	101	105	109	113	104	103	100	103	102	104	101	101	86	86	88
Rod Lawler (ENG)	112	83	85	81	84	84	83	84	83	83	83	83	83	85	85	86	86	89
Jenson Kendrick (ENG)	125	107	111	115	104	107	112	114	112	112	109	108	110	111	111	103	103	90
Ian Burns (ENG)	74	107	111	115	118	107	101	104	94	94	93	93	95	91	91	96	96	91
Ross Muir (SCO)		107	95	98	100	102	99	86	86	86	86	86	88	86	86	88	88	92
Xing Zihao (CHN)		101	108	113	116	97	87	89	91	91	86	86	84	86	86	88	88	93
Adam Duffy (ENG)	116	88	85	90	90	90	94	97	100	100	103	102	104	97	97	92	92	94
Ma Hailong (CHN)		101	108	93	94	97	97	100	97	97	100	99	100	99	99	101	101	95
Jiang Jun (CHN)		107	104	108	109	113	109	111	105	105	106	105	108	109	109	110	110	96
Peng Yisong (CHN)	114	86	83	86	91	94	90	93	93	93	92	92	89	89	89	95	95	97
Sean O'Sullivan (ENG)	106	81	82	84	89	89	86	88	87	88	88	88	89	89	89	85	85	98
Alfie Burden (ENG)	98	101	96	101	105	100	98	102	103	104	97	96	97	102	102	103	103	99
Ishpreet Singh Chadha (IND)		107	104	97	98	92	96	98	101	103	96	95	91	91	91	88	88	100
Liam Pullen (ENG)		107	111	115	109	113	115	100	102	102	105	104	96	94	94	98	98	101
Andrew Higginson (ENG)		101	96	101	101	104	104	107	112	112	106	105	100	99	99	101	101	102
Hammad Miah (ENG)	69	107	111	100	98	92	88	90	88	85	85	85	87	88	88	94	94	103
Rory Thor (MAS)		118	118	110	113	116	111	113	111	111	97	96	97	102	102	103	103	104
Andy Lee (HKG)	105	80	81	82	87	87	91	94	90	90	90	90	92	93	93	97	97	105
Andres Petrov (EST)	112	85	88	92	93	96	93	96	99	99	102	101	103	106	106	108	108	106
Muhammad Asif (PAK)	110	82	84	82	82	85	85	87	91	91	91	91	93	94	94	98	98	107
Alexander Ursenbacher (SUI)	86	101	108	113	116	119	120	120	115	112	109	108	106	107	107	109	109	108
Stan Moody (ENG)		118	118	121	121	122	107	110	109	107	109	108	110	104	104	106	106	109
Fergal O'Brien (IRL)	123	98	103	87	87	87	91	94	97	97	100	99	100	104	104	106	106	110
Andrew Pagett (WAL)	86	118	118	121	121	122	122	122	122	123	125	124	119	115	115	115	115	111
Mohamed Ibrahim (EGY)	119	91	94	96	97	100	102	106	105	106	108	107	109	110	110	111	111	112
Asjad Iqbal (PAK)	111	84	87	91	92	95	100	103	107	107	109	108	110	111	111	112	112	113
Jimmy White (ENG)	75	118	118	121	121	122	122	122	122	123	120	119	119	120	120	120	120	114
Ryan Thomerson (AUS)	118	90	92	99	103	106	109	111	110	110	114	113	113	113	113	113	113	115
Anton Kazakov (UKR)	121	93	96	101	105	109	104	107	112	112	115	114	114	114	114	114	114	116
Liam Graham (SCO)		118	118	110	113	116	118	118	120	120	116	115	115	115	115	115	115	117
Dean Young (SCO)	103	107	111	115	118	120	115	116	116	116	116	115	115	115	115	115	115	118
Mostafa Dorgham (EGY)		118	118	121	121	122	122	122	122	122	124	123	124	124	124	124	124	119
Mink Nutcharut (THA)	124	100	107	110	113	116	118	118	117	117	118	117	117	118	118	118	118	120
Himanshu Jain (IND)	121	93	96	101	105	109	113	115	118	118	119	118	118	119	119	119	119	121
Reanne Evans (ENG)	126	107	104	108	109	113	115	116	119	119	121	120	121	121	121	121	121	122
Manasawin Phetmalaikul (THA)		118	118	121	121	122	122	122	122	123	122	121	122	122	122	122	122	123
Victor Sarkis (BRA)	126	117	117	120	120	121	121	121	121	121	123	122	123	123	123	123	123	124
Rebecca Kenna (ENG)	128	118	118	121	121	122	122	122	122	123	125	124	125	125	125	125	125	125
Baipat Siripaporn (THA)		118	118	121	121	122	122	122	122	123	125	124	125	125	125	125	125	125
Stephen Hendry (SCO)	128	118	118	121	121	122	122	122	122	123	125	124	125	125	125	125	125	125
Ahmed Aly Elsayed (USA)		118	118	121	121	122	122	122	122	123	125	124	125	125	125	125	125	125
Mark King (ENG)	64	63	64	64	64	65	73	74	84	86	93							
Dechawat Poomjaeng (Note: Dechawat Poomjaeng's WPBSA membership has lapsed.) (THA)	114	86	90	93	94	97												

== Ranking points ==
This table contains the rankings points after each revision points. Blank fields indicate that the player was not active on the tour. New players on tour had no rankings at the start of the 2023–24 season, which are shown as revision 0. The list is initially sorted by the latest rankings.

Name	Seeding revisions																	
Name	0	1	2	3	4	5	6	7	8	9	10	11	12	13	14	15	16	17
Mark Allen (NIR)	860,500	837,500	837,500	840,500	845,000	791,000	794,000	803,000	791,000	841,000	833,500	837,000	824,500	825,500	946,500	945,000	965,000	965,000
Judd Trump (ENG)	556,000	556,000	586,000	589,000	669,000	799,000	869,000	878,000	916,000	908,500	904,000	944,000	1,014,000	1,004,000	985,000	1,051,000	1,061,000	911,000
Kyren Wilson (ENG)	427,000	424,000	435,000	440,000	440,000	436,000	426,000	435,000	395,000	394,000	396,500	396,500	404,000	397,000	385,500	381,500	381,500	851,500
Luca Brecel (BEL)	876,500	875,500	878,000	878,000	885,500	881,500	871,500	876,500	811,500	741,500	738,500	738,000	733,000	734,000	730,000	730,500	690,500	690,500
Ronnie O'Sullivan (ENG)	886,000	883,000	883,000	883,000	890,500	899,000	879,000	912,000	1,137,500	1,117,500	1,017,500	1,117,500	1,117,500	1,102,500	1,075,000	1,089,000	1,109,000	659,000
Mark Selby (ENG)	549,500	549,500	564,000	609,000	612,000	609,000	601,500	615,500	634,000	626,500	611,000	622,500	617,500	620,500	644,500	658,500	678,500	648,500
Shaun Murphy (ENG)	445,500	472,500	480,000	483,000	483,000	473,000	476,500	481,500	481,500	479,000	479,000	486,000	481,000	481,000	474,000	468,000	468,000	498,000
Ding Junhui (CHN)	243,500	243,500	243,500	251,500	262,500	267,000	259,500	281,500	375,000	375,000	379,500	399,500	399,500	402,500	408,500	456,500	486,500	466,500
Mark Williams (WAL)	391,000	412,000	316,500	416,500	424,000	421,000	424,000	429,000	447,500	448,000	443,000	435,500	434,500	424,000	431,000	427,500	557,500	457,500
Ali Carter (ENG)	310,000	300,000	296,000	304,000	311,500	371,500	368,500	390,500	384,000	392,000	389,000	395,500	403,500	403,500	419,500	413,000	443,000	428,000
Gary Wilson (ENG)	260,000	260,000	215,000	220,000	224,500	220,500	222,000	231,000	224,500	220,500	295,500	307,500	304,500	374,500	383,500	381,500	421,500	421,500
Zhang Anda (CHN)	76,500	77,500	77,500	77,500	112,500	124,500	129,000	304,000	329,000	325,500	333,000	345,000	344,000	347,000	384,000	386,000	416,000	406,000
Tom Ford (ENG)	195,000	184,000	188,500	200,500	203,500	216,500	215,500	290,500	299,000	295,000	293,500	301,000	303,500	311,000	310,000	305,500	325,500	340,500
Jak Jones (WAL)	127,000	130,000	125,000	125,000	125,000	125,500	127,000	136,000	129,500	129,500	129,500	128,500	125,500	133,000	126,000	117,500	117,500	317,500
Barry Hawkins (ENG)	206,500	204,500	284,500	292,500	295,500	304,500	318,000	340,000	315,000	315,000	310,000	314,500	314,500	269,000	271,000	292,500	312,500	312,500
John Higgins (SCO)	398,500	396,500	409,000	412,000	429,500	404,000	374,000	388,000	391,000	361,000	373,500	378,500	389,500	392,000	399,000	393,500	353,500	303,500
Robert Milkins (ENG)	285,500	294,500	294,500	297,500	302,000	307,000	307,000	307,000	315,500	316,000	316,000	316,000	320,500	328,000	328,000	283,500	283,500	298,500
Ryan Day (WAL)	245,500	238,500	238,500	243,500	246,500	251,500	251,500	265,500	265,500	262,500	265,500	265,500	266,500	271,000	252,500	255,500	255,500	285,500
Jack Lisowski (ENG)	279,000	279,000	282,000	294,000	297,000	305,000	322,500	331,500	307,000	307,000	302,500	307,000	304,000	308,500	285,500	277,000	277,000	257,000
Si Jiahui (CHN)	133,000	139,000	143,500	148,500	153,000	161,000	161,000	166,000	166,000	170,000	174,500	174,500	209,500	214,000	214,000	219,000	219,000	249,000
Hossein Vafaei (IRN)	239,000	241,000	237,000	257,000	261,500	261,500	263,000	268,000	301,000	297,000	289,500	247,000	247,000	241,500	228,500	244,500	244,500	244,500
David Gilbert (ENG)	201,500	174,500	170,000	178,000	181,000	171,000	178,000	183,000	173,500	164,000	163,500	168,000	167,000	161,500	150,500	155,500	155,500	235,500
Zhou Yuelong (CHN)	167,500	172,500	165,000	165,000	176,000	184,000	184,000	193,000	206,000	207,000	224,500	232,000	231,500	231,500	237,500	232,000	232,000	232,000
Chris Wakelin (ENG)	149,500	160,500	165,000	168,000	172,500	174,000	205,000	210,000	203,500	201,000	212,000	215,000	218,000	221,000	228,000	235,500	235,500	230,500
Stuart Bingham (ENG)	191,000	186,000	186,000	189,000	189,000	189,500	191,000	200,000	188,000	188,000	179,000	178,000	178,000	178,000	175,000	170,000	170,000	220,000
Noppon Saengkham (THA)	164,000	168,000	176,000	179,000	179,000	184,000	191,500	196,500	189,500	187,000	217,000	224,500	220,500	223,500	226,500	229,500	229,500	214,500
Pang Junxu (CHN)	133,500	135,500	133,500	133,500	133,500	141,500	141,500	155,500	165,500	161,500	166,000	171,000	172,500	172,500	166,500	171,500	171,500	181,500
Neil Robertson (AUS)	542,000	542,000	542,000	545,000	545,000	545,500	478,500	483,500	483,500	483,500	443,500	443,500	447,000	326,500	312,500	341,000	191,000	176,000
Joe O'Connor (ENG)	141,000	141,000	137,000	137,000	140,000	144,500	141,500	146,500	150,000	151,000	155,500	155,500	160,000	163,000	163,000	159,500	159,500	174,500
Lyu Haotian (CHN)	95,500	97,500	108,500	111,500	111,500	134,000	138,500	152,500	160,000	160,000	167,500	175,000	171,000	171,000	171,000	172,500	172,500	172,500
Stephen Maguire (SCO)	145,500	145,500	138,500	141,500	146,000	150,500	161,500	183,500	179,000	169,000	156,500	161,500	160,500	160,500	160,500	171,000	171,000	171,000
Anthony McGill (SCO)	212,000	212,000	212,000	212,000	215,000	215,000	215,500	229,500	215,000	195,000	197,500	197,500	193,500	204,500	193,500	190,000	190,000	160,000
Ricky Walden (ENG)	198,000	193,000	188,500	188,500	196,000	176,000	184,000	193,000	188,500	188,500	188,000	193,000	176,000	153,500	139,500	139,000	139,000	159,000
Xiao Guodong (CHN)	104,000	112,000	116,500	136,500	139,500	148,500	145,500	154,500	142,500	138,500	138,500	143,500	143,500	146,500	142,500	137,000	137,000	152,000
Cao Yupeng (CHN)	105,500	105,500	102,500	102,500	107,000	108,500	108,500	113,500	101,500	121,500	119,500	139,000	136,000	136,000	130,000	133,500	133,500	138,500
Robbie Williams (ENG)	90,000	95,000	96,500	101,500	101,500	101,500	101,500	106,500	107,500	105,000	108,000	100,000	103,000	110,500	107,500	114,500	114,500	134,500
Matthew Selt (ENG)	152,500	149,500	144,500	149,500	160,500	168,500	173,000	178,000	176,000	166,000	168,500	171,500	176,000	183,500	179,500	134,500	134,500	134,500
Yuan Sijun (CHN)	88,500	88,500	88,500	93,500	101,000	110,000	121,000	121,000	131,000	131,000	134,000	138,500	143,000	143,000	133,000	133,500	133,500	133,500
Wu Yize (CHN)	89,500	91,500	93,000	96,000	99,000	129,000	126,000	126,000	121,500	118,500	118,500	123,500	120,500	123,500	119,500	123,000	123,000	133,000
Dominic Dale (WAL)	73,500	74,500	74,500	77,500	80,500	85,000	88,000	97,000	90,000	94,000	101,500	106,500	106,500	117,500	117,500	126,500	126,500	131,500
Jamie Jones (WAL)	98,000	98,000	101,000	104,000	107,000	115,000	115,000	120,000	135,000	127,500	130,500	135,500	135,500	135,500	129,500	126,000	126,000	126,000
Elliot Slessor (ENG)	91,500	92,500	75,500	75,500	80,000	81,500	81,500	86,500	96,500	100,500	100,500	100,000	104,500	122,000	118,000	134,000	134,000	124,000
Thepchaiya Un-Nooh (THA)	109,500	112,500	117,000	120,000	120,000	124,500	120,500	134,500	138,000	139,000	142,000	147,000	154,500	154,500	148,500	139,000	139,000	119,000
Jordan Brown (NIR)	111,000	110,000	108,000	108,000	108,000	112,500	117,000	150,000	133,000	130,500	128,500	133,000	137,500	140,500	134,500	130,000	130,000	115,000
Jackson Page (WAL)	92,000	92,000	92,000	92,000	95,000	92,000	95,000	100,000	100,000	96,500	99,500	99,000	99,000	99,000	96,000	121,000	121,000	111,000
Sam Craigie (ENG)	88,500	97,500	97,500	97,500	97,500	102,500	107,000	112,000	100,000	96,000	100,500	100,500	113,000	113,000	113,000	110,500	110,500	110,500
Joe Perry (ENG)	165,500	167,500	170,500	170,500	170,500	170,500	178,000	178,000	179,000	176,000	176,000	176,000	180,500	180,500	106,500	110,000	110,000	110,000
Matthew Stevens (WAL)	99,500	99,500	102,500	107,500	107,500	103,500	106,500	111,500	111,500	112,000	115,000	115,000	115,000	118,000	107,500	109,000	109,000	104,000
Jimmy Robertson (ENG)	176,000	173,000	160,500	165,500	170,000	162,500	164,000	169,000	162,500	160,500	151,000	151,000	150,000	120,000	112,500	103,000	103,000	98,000
Fan Zhengyi (CHN)	138,000	140,000	140,000	152,000	155,000	152,000	155,000	160,000	163,500	163,500	163,500	163,000	164,000	171,500	91,500	97,000	97,000	97,000
Scott Donaldson (SCO)	87,500	87,500	87,500	95,500	98,500	103,000	100,000	105,000	112,500	105,000	108,000	108,000	111,000	111,000	103,500	100,000	100,000	95,000
Tian Pengfei (CHN)	84,500	86,500	86,500	89,500	89,500	85,500	82,500	87,500	81,000	81,500	81,500	81,000	84,000	87,000	87,000	88,500	88,500	88,500
Anthony Hamilton (ENG)	109,500	112,500	112,000	115,000	115,000	119,500	115,500	120,500	111,000	109,000	101,500	101,000	98,000	102,500	96,500	93,000	93,000	88,000
Graeme Dott (SCO)	108,500	104,500	104,500	112,500	117,000	121,500	121,500	121,500	109,500	110,500	110,500	110,500	115,000	119,500	98,000	90,500	90,500	85,500
Michael White (WAL)	34,500	40,500	45,000	45,000	48,000	52,500	55,500	60,500	68,000	70,000	70,000	70,000	70,000	70,000	70,000	75,000	75,000	85,000
Ben Woollaston (ENG)	95,500	97,500	105,000	105,000	105,000	106,500	102,500	102,500	95,500	88,000	83,000	83,000	86,000	86,000	78,500	85,000	85,000	85,000
Mark Davis (ENG)	57,000	55,000	55,000	55,000	59,500	64,000	59,500	68,500	73,500	74,500	77,500	77,500	79,000	79,000	73,000	69,500	69,500	84,500
Xu Si (CHN)	65,500	67,500	65,500	68,500	68,500	73,500	73,500	73,500	78,500	75,500	78,500	78,500	86,000	86,000	83,000	88,000	88,000	83,000
Jamie Clarke (WAL)	78,500	79,500	79,500	79,500	79,500	84,000	79,500	79,500	94,500	95,000	98,000	94,000	95,500	98,500	92,500	92,500	92,500	82,500
Aaron Hill (IRL)	26,000	27,000	30,000	30,000	30,000	46,000	53,500	53,500	53,500	53,500	58,000	58,000	61,000	65,500	65,500	70,500	70,500	80,500
David Grace (ENG)	82,500	80,500	77,500	80,500	83,500	80,500	80,500	85,500	84,000	84,000	84,000	84,000	84,000	84,000	84,000	85,500	85,500	80,500
Sanderson Lam (ENG)	24,000	28,000	31,000	36,000	40,500	45,000	45,000	50,000	50,000	51,000	62,000	62,000	62,000	65,000	65,000	70,000	70,000	80,000
Martin O'Donnell (ENG)	0	5,000	5,000	5,000	16,000	24,000	28,500	28,500	33,500	33,500	41,000	41,000	44,000	79,000	79,000	79,000	79,000	79,000
David Lilley (ENG)	33,000	35,000	35,000	35,000	38,000	38,000	38,000	38,000	45,500	46,500	46,500	46,500	51,000	54,000	54,000	68,000	68,000	78,000
Julien Leclercq (BEL)	33,500	35,500	35,500	40,500	43,500	43,500	46,500	46,500	51,500	52,000	55,000	55,000	62,500	65,500	65,500	65,500	65,500	75,500
He Guoqiang (CHN)	0	0	0	12,000	19,500	31,500	31,500	31,500	36,500	36,500	39,500	39,500	44,000	44,000	44,000	53,000	53,000	68,000
Ashley Hugill (ENG)	33,500	33,500	41,000	44,000	44,000	44,000	44,000	44,000	49,000	49,000	49,000	49,000	49,000	49,000	49,000	58,000	58,000	68,000
Daniel Wells (WAL)	0	4,000	7,000	10,000	10,000	14,500	14,500	28,500	33,500	33,500	36,500	36,500	36,500	41,000	41,000	55,000	55,000	65,000
Oliver Lines (ENG)	74,500	70,500	65,500	70,500	78,000	78,500	75,500	80,500	85,500	84,500	87,500	85,500	85,500	88,500	88,500	74,000	74,000	64,000
Zak Surety (ENG)	18,500	20,500	25,000	28,000	28,000	28,000	31,000	31,000	38,500	39,500	42,500	42,500	50,000	53,000	53,000	53,000	53,000	63,000
Ben Mertens (BEL)	26,000	27,000	31,500	34,500	34,500	42,500	42,500	42,500	42,500	42,500	45,500	45,500	48,500	51,500	51,500	51,500	51,500	61,500
Andy Hicks (ENG)	77,000	78,000	79,500	82,500	85,500	82,500	82,500	82,500	63,000	63,500	58,500	58,500	58,500	58,500	55,500	50,000	50,000	60,000
Mark Joyce (ENG)	65,000	64,000	64,000	64,000	64,000	68,500	65,500	70,500	68,500	69,000	69,000	68,500	71,500	71,500	68,500	68,500	68,500	58,500
James Cahill (ENG)	27,000	31,000	34,000	34,000	37,000	37,000	40,000	40,000	45,000	45,000	48,000	48,000	48,000	48,000	48,000	48,000	48,000	58,000
Dylan Emery (WAL)	24,500	26,500	29,500	29,500	34,000	34,000	38,500	47,500	52,500	53,500	53,500	53,500	53,500	58,000	58,000	58,000	58,000	58,000
Lukas Kleckers (GER)	23,500	24,500	24,500	24,500	27,500	27,500	30,500	30,500	38,000	38,500	41,500	41,500	41,500	41,500	41,500	46,500	46,500	56,500
John Astley (ENG)	33,000	38,000	38,000	38,000	38,000	38,000	38,000	43,000	43,000	43,000	43,000	43,000	43,000	43,000	43,000	43,000	43,000	53,000
Liu Hongyu (CHN)	0	6,000	9,000	12,000	29,500	29,500	29,500	29,500	29,500	29,500	34,000	34,000	37,000	37,000	37,000	42,000	42,000	52,000
Ken Doherty (IRL)	23,500	24,500	27,500	30,500	30,500	30,500	33,500	33,500	41,000	41,000	41,000	41,000	44,000	44,000	44,000	44,000	44,000	44,000
Marco Fu (HKG)	14,000	0	0	0	0	4,500	7,500	16,500	21,500	21,500	21,500	21,500	24,500	32,000	32,000	32,000	32,000	42,000
Ashley Carty (ENG)	0	5,000	16,000	21,000	21,000	29,000	29,000	29,000	29,000	29,500	34,000	34,000	37,000	37,000	37,000	37,000	37,000	42,000
Liam Highfield (ENG)	81,000	79,000	74,000	74,000	74,000	82,000	82,000	82,000	70,000	70,000	73,000	72,000	68,000	68,000	61,000	61,000	61,000	41,000
Martin Gould (ENG)	74,000	74,000	71,000	71,000	74,000	71,000	67,000	67,000	65,500	58,000	53,500	53,500	56,500	56,500	52,500	40,000	40,000	40,000
Oliver Brown (ENG)	5,500	7,500	10,500	13,500	16,500	16,500	16,500	16,500	16,500	17,000	17,000	17,000	20,000	20,000	20,000	25,000	25,000	35,000
Louis Heathcote (ENG)	37,000	2,000	5,000	5,000	8,000	8,000	8,000	8,000	10,500	11,000	11,000	11,000	14,000	14,000	14,000	19,000	19,000	34,000
Stuart Carrington (ENG)	48,000	1,000	1,000	1,000	4,000	8,500	8,500	13,500	16,000	16,000	16,000	16,000	16,000	19,000	19,000	24,000	24,000	34,000
Allan Taylor (ENG)	14,000	16,000	20,500	20,500	23,500	23,500	23,500	23,500	26,000	26,000	26,000	26,000	26,000	29,000	29,000	29,000	29,000	34,000
Long Zehuang (CHN)	0	5,000	5,000	5,000	5,000	5,000	5,000	10,000	12,500	14,500	14,500	14,500	14,500	17,500	17,500	26,500	26,500	31,500
Rod Lawler (ENG)	10,500	11,500	11,500	16,500	16,500	21,000	24,000	24,000	26,500	26,500	26,500	26,500	26,500	26,500	26,500	26,500	26,500	31,500
Jenson Kendrick (ENG)	1,000	1,000	1,000	1,000	5,500	5,500	5,500	5,500	8,000	8,000	11,000	11,000	11,000	11,000	11,000	16,000	16,000	31,000
Ian Burns (ENG)	42,000	1,000	1,000	1,000	1,000	5,500	10,000	10,000	17,500	18,000	18,000	18,000	18,000	21,000	21,000	21,000	21,000	31,000
Ross Muir (SCO)	0	1,000	5,500	8,500	8,500	8,500	11,500	20,500	23,000	23,000	23,000	23,000	23,000	26,000	26,000	26,000	26,000	31,000
Xing Zihao (CHN)	0	2,000	2,000	2,000	2,000	10,000	17,500	17,500	20,000	20,000	23,000	23,000	26,000	26,000	26,000	26,000	26,000	31,000
Adam Duffy (ENG)	8,500	8,500	11,500	11,500	14,500	14,500	14,500	14,500	14,500	14,500	14,500	14,500	14,500	19,000	19,000	24,000	24,000	29,000
Ma Hailong (CHN)	0	2,000	2,000	10,000	10,000	10,000	13,000	13,000	15,500	15,500	15,500	15,500	15,500	18,500	18,500	18,500	18,500	28,500
Jiang Jun (CHN)	0	1,000	4,000	4,000	4,000	4,000	7,000	7,000	12,000	12,500	12,500	12,500	12,500	12,500	12,500	12,500	12,500	27,500
Peng Yisong (CHN)	10,000	10,000	13,000	13,000	13,000	13,000	16,000	16,000	18,500	19,000	19,000	19,000	22,000	22,000	22,000	22,000	22,000	27,000
Sean O'Sullivan (ENG)	15,000	15,000	15,000	15,000	15,000	15,000	19,500	19,500	22,000	22,000	22,000	22,000	22,000	22,000	22,000	27,000	27,000	27,000
Alfie Burden (ENG)	23,500	2,000	5,000	5,000	5,000	9,500	12,500	12,500	12,500	13,000	16,000	16,000	16,000	16,000	16,000	16,000	16,000	26,000
Ishpreet Singh Chadha (IND)	0	1,000	4,000	9,000	9,000	13,500	13,500	13,500	13,500	13,500	16,500	16,500	21,000	21,000	21,000	26,000	26,000	26,000
Liam Pullen (ENG)	0	1,000	1,000	1,000	4,000	4,000	4,000	13,000	13,000	14,000	14,000	14,000	17,000	20,000	20,000	20,000	20,000	25,000
Andrew Higginson (ENG)	0	2,000	5,000	5,000	8,000	8,000	8,000	8,000	8,000	8,000	12,500	12,500	15,500	18,500	18,500	18,500	18,500	23,500
Hammad Miah (ENG)	55,000	1,000	1,000	6,000	9,000	13,500	16,500	16,500	21,500	23,500	23,500	23,500	23,500	23,500	23,500	23,500	23,500	23,500
Rory Thor (MAS)	0	0	0	3,000	3,000	3,000	6,000	6,000	8,500	8,500	16,000	16,000	16,000	16,000	16,000	16,000	16,000	21,000
Andy Lee (HKG)	15,500	15,500	15,500	15,500	15,500	15,500	15,500	15,500	20,500	20,500	20,500	20,500	20,500	20,500	20,500	20,500	20,500	20,500
Andres Petrov (EST)	10,500	10,500	10,500	10,500	10,500	10,500	15,000	15,000	15,000	15,000	15,000	15,000	15,000	15,000	15,000	15,000	15,000	20,000
Muhammad Asif (PAK)	11,500	12,500	12,500	15,500	20,000	20,000	20,000	20,000	20,000	20,000	20,000	20,000	20,000	20,000	20,000	20,000	20,000	20,000
Alexander Ursenbacher (SUI)	30,000	2,000	2,000	2,000	2,000	2,000	2,000	2,000	7,000	8,000	11,000	11,000	14,000	14,000	14,000	14,000	14,000	19,000
Stan Moody (ENG)	0	0	0	0	0	0	7,500	7,500	10,000	11,000	11,000	11,000	11,000	15,500	15,500	15,500	15,500	15,500
Fergal O'Brien (IRL)	3,500	4,500	4,500	12,500	15,500	15,500	15,500	15,500	15,500	15,500	15,500	15,500	15,500	15,500	15,500	15,500	15,500	15,500
Andrew Pagett (WAL)	30,000	0	0	0	0	0	0	0	0	0	0	0	4,500	7,500	7,500	7,500	7,500	12,500
Mohamed Ibrahim (EGY)	5,500	6,500	6,500	9,500	9,500	9,500	9,500	9,500	12,000	12,000	12,000	12,000	12,000	12,000	12,000	12,000	12,000	12,000
Asjad Iqbal (PAK)	11,000	11,000	11,000	11,000	11,000	11,000	11,000	11,000	11,000	11,000	11,000	11,000	11,000	11,000	11,000	11,000	11,000	11,000
Jimmy White (ENG)	40,000	0	0	0	0	0	0	0	0	0	4,500	4,500	4,500	4,500	4,500	4,500	4,500	9,500
Ryan Thomerson (AUS)	7,000	7,000	7,000	7,000	7,000	7,000	7,000	7,000	9,500	9,500	9,500	9,500	9,500	9,500	9,500	9,500	9,500	9,500
Anton Kazakov (UKR)	5,000	5,000	5,000	5,000	5,000	5,000	8,000	8,000	8,000	8,000	8,000	8,000	8,000	8,000	8,000	8,000	8,000	8,000
Liam Graham (SCO)	0	0	0	3,000	3,000	3,000	3,000	3,000	3,000	3,000	7,500	7,500	7,500	7,500	7,500	7,500	7,500	7,500
Dean Young (SCO)	16,000	1,000	1,000	1,000	1,000	1,000	4,000	4,000	6,500	7,500	7,500	7,500	7,500	7,500	7,500	7,500	7,500	7,500
Mostafa Dorgham (EGY)	0	0	0	0	0	0	0	0	0	500	500	500	500	500	500	500	500	5,500
Mink Nutcharut (THA)	3,000	3,000	3,000	3,000	3,000	3,000	3,000	3,000	5,500	5,500	5,500	5,500	5,500	5,500	5,500	5,500	5,500	5,500
Himanshu Jain (IND)	5,000	5,000	5,000	5,000	5,000	5,000	5,000	5,000	5,000	5,000	5,000	5,000	5,000	5,000	5,000	5,000	5,000	5,000
Reanne Evans (ENG)	500	1,000	4,000	4,000	4,000	4,000	4,000	4,000	4,000	4,000	4,000	4,000	4,000	4,000	4,000	4,000	4,000	4,000
Manasawin Phetmalaikul (THA)	0	0	0	0	0	0	0	0	0	0	3,000	3,000	3,000	3,000	3,000	3,000	3,000	3,000
Victor Sarkis (BRA)	500	500	500	500	500	500	500	500	500	1,000	1,000	1,000	1,000	1,000	1,000	1,000	1,000	1,000
Rebecca Kenna (ENG)	0	0	0	0	0	0	0	0	0	0	0	0	0	0	0	0	0	0
Baipat Siripaporn (THA)	0	0	0	0	0	0	0	0	0	0	0	0	0	0	0	0	0	0
Stephen Hendry (SCO)	0	0	0	0	0	0	0	0	0	0	0	0	0	0	0	0	0	0
Ahmed Aly Elsayed (USA)	0	0	0	0	0	0	0	0	0	0	0	0	0	0	0	0	0	0
Mark King (ENG)	67,000	65,000	62,000	62,000	62,000	58,000	38,000	38,000	26,000	23,000	18,000							
Dechawat Poomjaeng (Note: Dechawat Poomjaeng's WPBSA membership has lapsed.) (THA)	10,000	10,000	10,000	10,000	10,000	10,000												
