= World Mixed Doubles (snooker) =

Snooker tournament

Tournament information
- Venue: Manchester Central
- Location: Manchester
- Country: England
- Established: 1991
- Organisation(s): World Snooker Tour
- Format: Non-ranking team event
- Recent edition: 2024
- Current champion: Luca Brecel (BEL); Reanne Evans (ENG)

The World Mixed Doubles is a professional snooker team tournament. The reigning champions are Luca Brecel and Reanne Evans.

== History ==
The event was first held in 1991, at Green's Leisure Centre, Hamburg, Germany. The winners were Steve Davis and Allison Fisher, who defeated Stephen Hendry and Stacey Hillyard 5–4 in the final.

After a 30-year hiatus, the event was re-introduced during the 2022/23 snooker season. Staged in Milton Keynes, England, the 2022 edition featured four teams, comprising respectively the top four ranked players from the World Snooker Tour and the World Women's Snooker Tour. The format was a round-robin with four-frame matches, followed by a best-of-seven-frame final between the top two teams. World number four Neil Robertson and the 2022 women's world champion Mink Nutcharut defeated Mark Selby and Rebecca Kenna 4–2 in the 2022 final, receiving £30,000 each in prize money.

The event returned in the same format during the 2023/24 snooker season. The 2024 edition was staged from 30 to 31 March 2024 at Manchester Central in Manchester, England, immediately preceding the 2024 Tour Championship. Luca Brecel and Reanne Evans won the tournament, defeating Selby and Kenna 4–2 in the final.

== Winners ==
Year	Winners	Runners-up	Final score	Venue	City	Season
1991	Steve Davis (ENG); Allison Fisher (ENG)	Stephen Hendry (SCO); Stacey Hillyard (ENG)	5–4	Green's Leisure Centre	Hamburg, Germany	1991/92
1993	Steve Davis (ENG); Allison Fisher (ENG)	Stephen Hendry (SCO); Stacey Hillyard (ENG)	8–6		Waregem, Belgium	1993/94
2022	Neil Robertson (AUS); Mink Nutcharut (THA)	Mark Selby (ENG); Rebecca Kenna (ENG)	4–2	Marshall Arena	Milton Keynes, England	2022/23
2024	Luca Brecel (BEL); Reanne Evans (ENG)	Mark Selby (ENG); Rebecca Kenna (ENG)	4–2	Manchester Central	Manchester, England	2023/24
