= 2011 Wuxi Classic =

2011 snooker tournament, Wuxi, China

Wuxi Classic

Tournament information
- Dates: 7–10 July 2011
- Venue: Wuxi City Sports Park Stadium
- City: Wuxi
- Country: China
- Organisation: WPBSA
- Format: Non-ranking event
- Total prize fund: £56,000
- Winner's share: £20,000
- Highest break: 137

Final
- Champion: (England) Mark Selby
- Runner-up: (England) Ali Carter
- Score: 9–7

The 2011 Wuxi Classic was a professional non-ranking snooker tournament held between 7–10 July 2011 at the Wuxi City Sports Park Stadium in Wuxi, China.

Shaun Murphy was the defending champion, but he lost in the semi-finals 3–6 against Ali Carter. Mark Selby won in the final 9–7 against Carter.

== Prize fund ==
The breakdown of prize money for this year is shown below:

- Winner: £20,000
- Runner-Up: £10,000
- Semi-final: £5,000
- Quarter-final: £2,500
- Last 12: £1,250
- Highest break: £1,000
- Total: £56,000

== Main draw ==
Last 12; Best of 9 frames
(England) Peter Ebdon	5
(China) Rouzi Maimaiti	3
(Wales) Matthew Stevens	4
(China) Yu Delu	5
(Scotland) Stephen Maguire	5
(China) Liang Wenbo	2
(Scotland) Graeme Dott	5
(China) Cao Yupeng	2

Quarter-finals; Best of 9 frames
(England) Shaun Murphy	5
(England) Peter Ebdon	1
(England) Ali Carter	5
(China) Yu Delu	3
(China) Ding Junhui	5
(Scotland) Stephen Maguire	4
(England) Mark Selby	5
(Scotland) Graeme Dott	0

Semi-finals; Best of 11 frames
(England) Shaun Murphy	3
(England) Ali Carter	6
(China) Ding Junhui	5
(England) Mark Selby	6

Final; Best of 17 frames
(England) Ali Carter	7
(England) Mark Selby	9

== Final ==
Final: Best of 17 frames Wuxi City Sports Park Stadium, Wuxi, China, 10 July 2011.
Ali Carter; England	7–9	Mark Selby; England
Afternoon: 0–102 (89), 61–45, 34–92 (92), 42–69, 90–38 (90), 27–81 (66), 71–46, 73–31 (72); Evening: 84–40 (84), 0–71 (71), 0–78 (53), 35–50, 0–81 (80), 107–0 (94), 103–29 (99), 0–134 (100)
99	Highest break	100
0	Century breaks	1
5	50+ breaks	7

== Century breaks ==
- 137 – Ding Junhui
- 134, 100 – Mark Selby
- 124, 107 – Stephen Maguire
- 113, 107 – Peter Ebdon
- 102 – Shaun Murphy
- 101 – Ali Carter
