= 2024 World Mixed Doubles (snooker) =

Snooker event

Tournament information
- Dates: 30–31 March 2024
- Venue: Manchester Central
- City: Manchester
- Country: England
- Organisation: World Snooker Tour
- Format: Non-ranking, mixed doubles
- Total prize fund: £140,000
- Winner's share: £60,000 (£30,000 per player)
- Highest break: Mark Selby (ENG) (90)

Final
- Champion: Luca Brecel (BEL); Reanne Evans (ENG)
- Runner-up: Mark Selby (ENG); Rebecca Kenna (ENG)
- Score: 4–2

The 2024 World Mixed Doubles was a non‑ranking professional mixed doubles snooker tournament that took place from 30 to 31 March 2024 at the Manchester Central in Manchester, England. Organised by the World Snooker Tour, it was the third staging of the tournament, following previous editions in 1991 and 2022. It featured a total prize fund of £140,000, of which the winners received £60,000 (£30,000 per player).

Four teams participated in the tournament: Neil Robertson and Mink Nutcharut, Mark Selby and Rebecca Kenna, Luca Brecel and Reanne Evans, and Judd Trump and Baipat Siripaporn. The tournament was played as a round‑robin with four‑frame matches, followed by a final between the top two teams, played as the best of seven frames.

Robertson and Nutcharut were the defending champions, having defeated Selby and Kenna 4‍–‍2 in the 2022 final, but they were eliminated at the round‑robin stage after two draws and a defeat. Brecel and Evans won the tournament with a 4‍–‍2 victory over Selby and Kenna in the final. Selby made the tournament's highest break of 90 during his and Kenna's round‑robin match with Brecel and Evans.

== Format ==
First held in Hamburg in 1991, the inaugural edition of the World Mixed Doubles was won by Steve Davis and Allison Fisher, who defeated Stephen Hendry and Stacey Hillyard 5‍–‍4 in the final. The event was reintroduced in 2022, featuring four teams, made up of the top four men from the snooker world rankings and the top four women from the World Women's Snooker rankings. The teams competed in a round‑robin tournament with matches consisting of four frames each. The top two teams from the round‑robin stage progressed to the final, which was contested as the best of seven frames. Instead of "scotch doubles" rules, in which teammates alternate shots, the event was played using alternate visits.

Neil Robertson and women's world number one Mink Nutcharut were the defending champions. The other teams were selected via a draw that took place on 23 February 2024. World number two Judd Trump was paired with Baipat Siripaporn, the 2023 World Women's Champion. Luca Brecel, the reigning World Champion, was paired with 12‑time World Women's Champion Reanne Evans. World number three Mark Allen was drawn alongside women's world number four Rebecca Kenna, but Allen withdrew for personal reasons and was replaced by world number five Mark Selby.

=== Broadcasters ===
The event was broadcast by ITV4 in the United Kingdom; Liaoning TV, Migu, and Huya in mainland China; Now TV in Hong Kong; Astro SuperSport in Malaysia and Brunei; True Sports in Thailand; Sportcast in Taiwan; Premier Sports Network in the Philippines; Fastsports in Pakistan; and Matchroom.live in all other territories.

=== Prize Fund ===
A breakdown of the prize money awarded for the event is shown below:

- Winners: £60,000 – (£30,000 per player)
- Runners-up: £40,000 – (£20,000 per player)
- Third in group: £20,000 – (£10,000 per player)
- Fourth in group: £20,000 – (£10,000 per player)
- Total: £140,000

== Draw ==
=== Round Robin ===
The results from the round‑robin stage are shown below. Teams in bold denote match winners.

Robertson / Nutcharut	2–2	Brecel / Evans
Trump / Siripaporn	2–2	Selby / Kenna
**Brecel / Evans**	**3**–1	Trump / Siripaporn
Robertson / Nutcharut	2–2	Selby / Kenna
Robertson / Nutcharut	1–**3**	**Trump / Siripaporn**
Brecel / Evans	1–**3**	**Selby / Kenna**

Pos	Players	MW	MD	ML	HB	FW
1	Mark Selby (ENG); Rebecca Kenna (ENG)	1	2	0	90	7
2	Luca Brecel (BEL); Reanne Evans (ENG)	1	1	1	42	6
3	Judd Trump (ENG); Baipat Siripaporn (THA)	1	1	1	89	6
4	Neil Robertson (AUS); Mink Nutcharut (THA)	0	2	1	50	5

Note: Brecel and Evans finished the round‑robin matches equal with Trump and Siripaporn on both matches and frames won. Brecel and Evans had won the head‑to‑head match between the two teams, and so finished ahead in the table.

=== Final ===
Final
Final: Best of 7 frames. Referee: Maike Kesseler; Manchester Central, Manchester, England, 31 March 2024
**Luca Brecel** (BEL); **Reanne Evans** (ENG)	**4**–2	Mark Selby (ENG); Rebecca Kenna (ENG)
Frame scores: **111**–0, **54**–19, 52–**62**, 7–**67**, **50**–26, **71**–25
(Brecel, frame 6) 59	Highest break	**67** (frame 4, Selby)
0	Century breaks	0
