= Mark Selby =

English snooker player (born 1983)

Mark Selby MBE
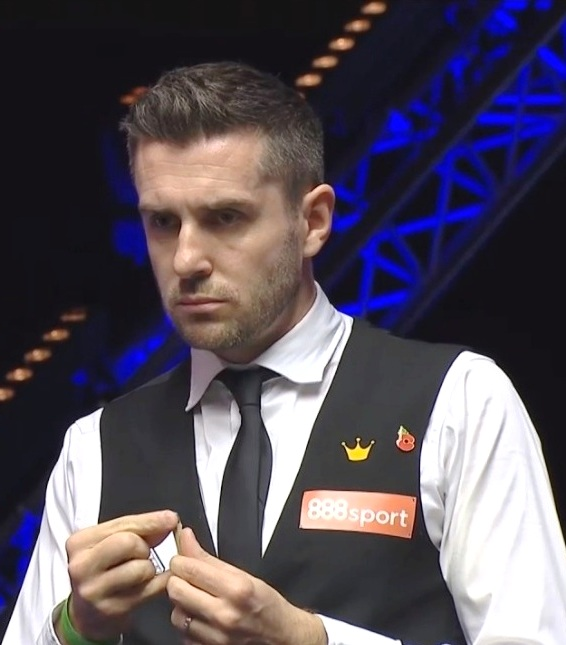
- Selby at the 2020 Champion of Champions

Personal information
- Nickname: The Jester from Leicester
- Born: 19 June 1983 (age 43) Leicester, England

Sport
- Country: England
- Sport: Snooker
- Professional: 1999–present
- Highest ranking: 1 (Sep 2011–Nov 2012; Dec 2012–Feb 2013; Apr–Jun 2013; May–Jul 2014; Aug–Dec 2014; Feb 2015–Mar 2019; Aug–Oct 2021; Nov 2021–Apr 2022)
- Current ranking: 4 (as of 7 November 2026)
- Maximum breaks: 6
- Century breaks: 981 (as of 19 November 2026)

Tournament wins
- Ranking: 26
- Minor-ranking: 7
- World Championship: 2014; 2016; 2017; 2021

Mark Anthony Selby (born 19 June 1983) is an English professional snooker player. Ranked world number one on multiple occasions, he has won a total of 26 ranking titles, placing him joint-seventh on the all-time list of ranking tournament winners. He is a four-time World Snooker Champion, and has won the Masters and the UK Championship three times each for a total of ten Triple Crown titles, placing him behind only Ronnie O'Sullivan (23), Stephen Hendry (18) and Steve Davis (15).

After winning the England Under-15 Championship in 1998, Selby turned professional in 1999, aged 16. He made his Crucible debut in 2005, and reached his first World Championship final in 2007, when he was runner-up to John Higgins. He won his first major title at the 2008 Masters, and his first ranking title at the 2008 Welsh Open. Between 2014 and 2017, he won the World Championship three times in four years. He first became world number one in September 2011, and held onto the top ranking position for just over four years between February 2015 and March 2019. He has compiled more than 900 century breaks in professional competition, including six maximum breaks, one of which is the only one to have been made during the final of the World Championships.

Selby is also an accomplished pool player. He won the WEPF World Eightball Championship in 2006 and was runner-up at the Chinese Eight-ball World Championship in 2015. With four world snooker titles and one world pool title to his name, Selby has held world champion status in two different cue sports. In December 2022, he won the Ultimate Pool Pairs Cup alongside his brother-in-law Gareth Potts.

== Career ==
=== 1998–2007 ===
A winner of the England under-15 championship in 1998, Selby joined the professional tour a year later in 1999, at the age of 16. In early 2002, he reached the semi-finals of the China Open, despite leaving his hotel room at 2 a.m. instead of 2 p.m. for one of his matches because of jetlag. In April 2003, aged 19, he reached his first ranking final at the Scottish Open, where he finished runner-up to David Gray, earning himself a place in the top 32 for the first time. In October 2004, he made it to the quarter-finals stage of the 2004 Grand Prix with a 5–3 win over Peter Ebdon, but there he was whitewashed 5–0 by Ronnie O'Sullivan, the tournament's eventual champion. Selby got to the final round of qualifying at the World Snooker Championships in 2002, 2003 and 2004, but failed to progress to the knockout stages at the Crucible Theatre on all three occasions.

From late 2005, Selby was managed by former snooker professional and fellow Leicester resident Mukesh Parmar. He progressed to the main draw of the 2005 World Championship, losing 5–10 to John Higgins in the first round. He then faced Higgins in the first round again at the 2006 World Championship, this time defeating the reigning Grand Prix and Masters champion 10–4, before being eliminated in the second round by Mark Williams.

Selby reached the final of the 2007 World Championship, beating Stephen Lee 10–7 in the first round, after winning eight successive frames from 0–5 behind to lead 8–5, then defeating former world champion Peter Ebdon 13–8 in the second round, making five centuries, with three of them being consecutive. In the quarter-finals, he beat Ali Carter 13–12, from 11–8 ahead and 11–12 behind, in a match that lasted well over nine hours. Then after trailing 14–16, he won his semi-final match 17–16 against Shaun Murphy, in another deciding frame that he took with a 64 break. In the final, John Higgins led 12–4 after the second session, but Selby won all six frames played in the third session on Monday afternoon, before time ran out due to the length of the frames; he was therefore only 10–12 behind entering the final session, and closed to within one frame at 13–14 before eventually losing the match 13–18. Higgins pointed out in his victory speech that Selby was "the most improved player on the tour".

Selby's performance in the 2006–07 season earned him a place in the top 16 for the first time for the 2007–08 season, where he was ranked 11th. His victories over Lee, Ebdon, Carter and Murphy at the 2007 World Championship also won him the inaugural 888.com Silver Chip award for outstanding performance, awarded by the Snooker Writers' Association.

=== 2007–08 season: first Masters title ===
Next season, Selby made it to the semi-finals in the 2007 Shanghai Masters, but was defeated by Dominic Dale, who went on to win the tournament. Selby also had a strong run in the UK Championship, reaching the semi-finals as well, where he met the eventual winner of the event, Ronnie O'Sullivan. Selby led 7–5, but fell 7–8 behind before levelling the match at 8–8; however, O'Sullivan made a 147 break in the deciding frame to win 9–8.

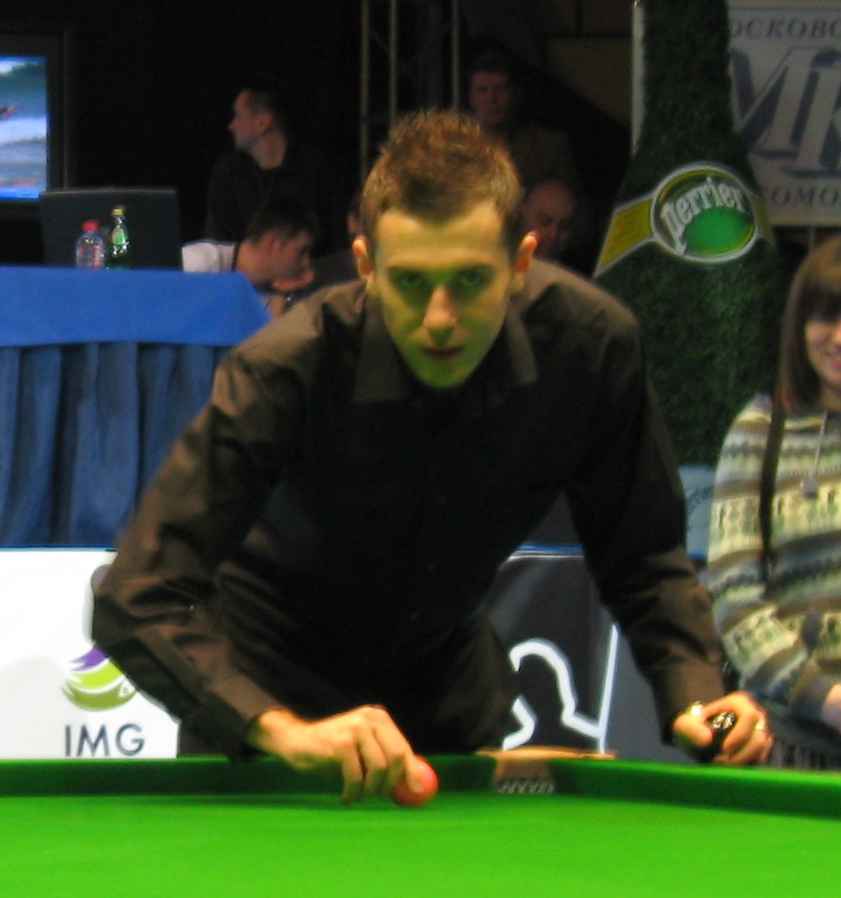
Selby at the 2008 World Series of Snooker in Moscow

On 20 January 2008, Selby won his first major tournament, the Masters at Wembley Arena in London. En route to the final, he had edged out Stephen Hendry, Stephen Maguire and Ken Doherty, all on a 6–5 scoreline. In the final against Stephen Lee, Selby took control and reeled off eight consecutive frames from 2–3 behind to lead 5–3 at the break and to achieve a decisive 10–3 victory. He produced a high standard of play in the final, compiling four century breaks in total; his final-frame effort, a total clearance of 141, equalled the highest break of the tournament.

Selby claimed his first world ranking title at the Welsh Open on 17 February 2008, winning a close-fought final 9–8 against Ronnie O'Sullivan after recovering from 5–8 behind. He also was a semi-finalist in the China Open, and a finalist in the inaugural Championship League event. However, he could not reproduce his Crucible success from the previous season; despite going into the 2008 World Championship as one of the bookmakers' favourites for the title, Selby was defeated 8–10 in the first round by Mark King.

=== 2008–09 season ===
The following season Selby was defeated at the 2008 Shanghai Masters, once again in the semi-final stage by the event's eventual winner, this time Ricky Walden. Then at the beginning of the new year, he reached the final of the Masters again, where he was runner-up to Ronnie O'Sullivan, losing the match 8–10 after leading 7–5. In the Welsh Open quarter-finals he was handed a writ by a member of the audience, supposedly his former manager George Barmby. Selby commented that all he could think about was the envelope that had been given to him before he was defeated 3–5 by Anthony Hamilton. Later on in the season, he made it to the final once more in the 2009 Championship League, and also reached the quarter-finals of the 2009 World Championship, losing 12–13 to John Higgins, who went on to win his third world title.

=== 2009–10 season: second Masters title ===
Selby recovered from 4–8 behind to beat Jamie Cope 9–8 in the first round of the 2009 UK Championship, but was beaten in the quarter-finals 3–9, yet again by Ronnie O'Sullivan. On 17 January 2010, having reached the final for the third time in as many years, he won his second Masters title, in a repeat of the previous year's final where he had lost to O'Sullivan. This time, after falling behind 6–9, with O'Sullivan needing one more frame for another victory, Selby took the next four frames to win the championship 10–9. He came within reach of his second World Championship final in 2010, losing in the semi-finals 14–17 to Graeme Dott, despite pulling up to 10–11 and 13–14.

=== 2010–11 season ===
In July 2010, Selby won the Six-red World Championship in Bangkok, with an 8–6 victory over Ricky Walden in the final. At the 2011 China Open, he beat Tian Pengfei, Robert Milkins, Ali Carter, and home favourite Ding Junhui, but was defeated 8–10 by Judd Trump in the final. At the 2011 World Championship, he set the record for the most century breaks compiled in a world championship match when he made six in his second-round tie with Stephen Hendry. This was also a record for a best-of-25-frames match, and took Selby's century tally for the season to 54, setting a new record for the most centuries compiled by one player in a single season.

=== 2011–12 season ===
Selby started the season by winning the non-ranking Wuxi Classic with a 9–7 victory over Ali Carter. He won his second ranking event at the Shanghai Masters, where he defeated Mark Williams 10–9 in the final, winning the last three frames from 7–9 behind. With this victory, Selby replaced Williams as world number one, moving to the top of the world rankings for the first time in his career.

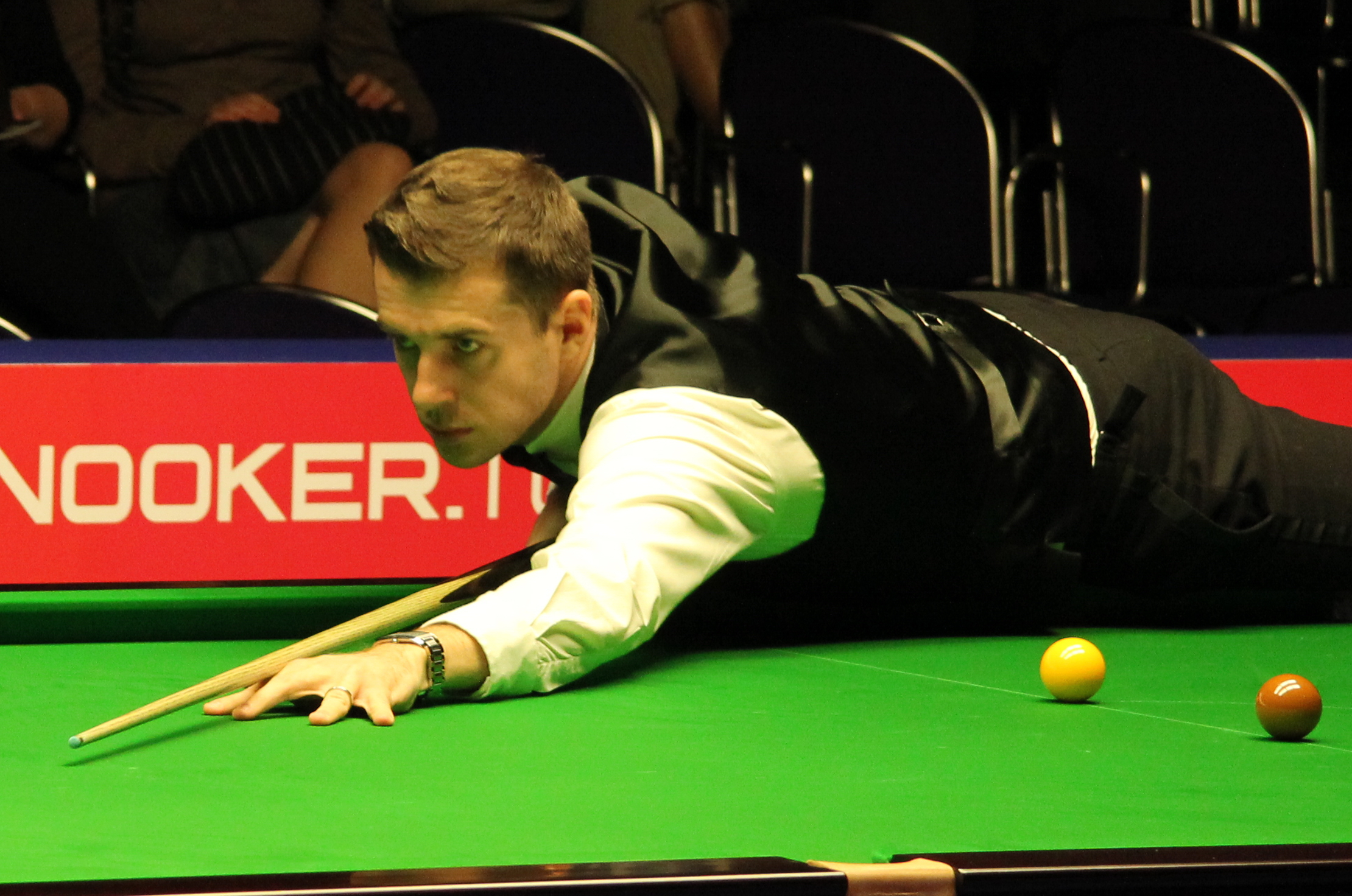
Selby at the 2011 Paul Hunter Classic

He also won the minor-ranking PTC Event 4 (the 2011 edition of the Paul Hunter Classic); having edged out Ronnie O'Sullivan 4–3 in the semi-finals, he achieved a 4–0 whitewash over Mark Davis in the final. Selby eventually finished fifth on the PTC Order of Merit and therefore qualified to the last 16 of the PTC Grand Final. He beat Ding Junhui 4–1, before losing 0–4 to eventual winner Stephen Lee in the quarter-finals.

Selby progressed to the quarter-finals of the Masters in January, where he lost 2–6 to Shaun Murphy. He was defeated by Murphy again the following month, in the quarter-finals of the German Masters, losing the match 3–5. After reaching the final of the Welsh Open, where he lost 6–9 to Ding, he met Murphy for the third time in less than six weeks, in the quarter-finals of the World Open, this time achieving a 5–0 whitewash. However, he then suffered a 5–6 semi-final defeat against Mark Allen, despite having built up a 5–2 lead.

Selby withdrew from the second round of the China Open because of a neck injury. His decision to withdraw was also a precautionary measure to make sure he was ready for the upcoming World Championship. He played Barry Hawkins in the first round and was defeated 3–10. After the match, Selby admitted that he had only managed nine hours of practice in preparation for the tournament, and there were certain shots that he was physically unable to play. Despite this disappointment, he finished the season still as world number one.

=== 2012–13 season: first UK Championship; third Masters title ===
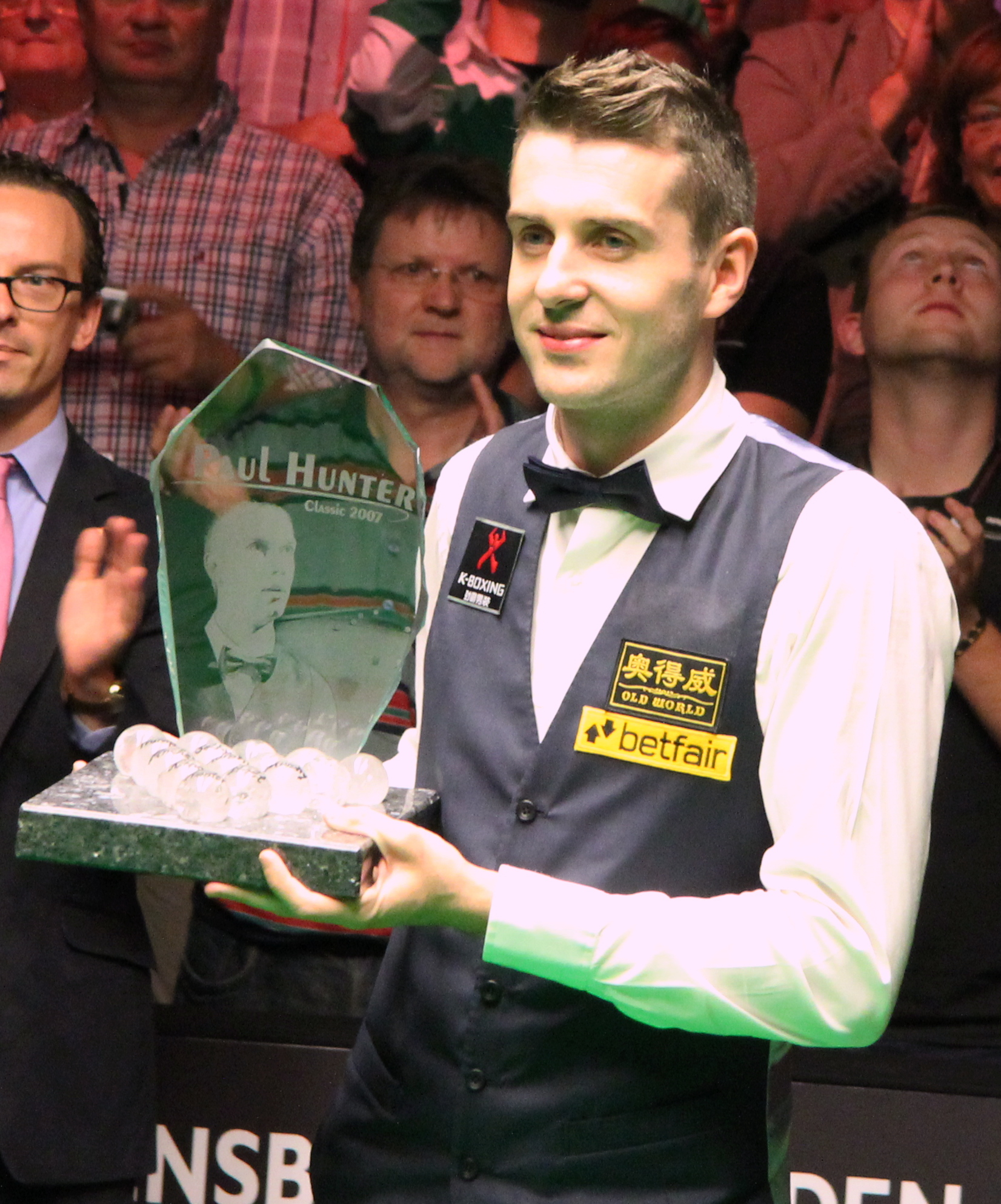
Selby with the 2012 Paul Hunter Classic trophy

Selby announced he felt "90 per cent fit" just before the start of the season, as he continued his recovery from the disc bulge in his neck. His first event was the Wuxi Classic where he played Barry Hawkins in the last 32; having been eliminated from the World Championship by Hawkins two months earlier, Selby this time won 5–2, and then whitewashed Jamie Cope 5–0 to set up a quarter-final match with in-form Stuart Bingham, but lost in the deciding frame 4–5. He won seven matches in a row to reach the quarter-finals of the Six-red World Championship, where he was defeated 5–7 by Judd Trump. He then suffered a shock 3–5 first-round defeat to Jamie Burnett in the Australian Goldfields Open.

Selby lost his world number one ranking on 2 November 2012, when Trump claimed the top spot by reaching the final of the inaugural International Championship in China. However, just five weeks later, Selby regained the top ranking position by winning the UK Championship, for his third ranking title and most significant of his career to that date. He defeated Michael White 6–3, Ryan Day 6–4 after trailing 0–3, and Neil Robertson 6–4 from 0–4 behind, to reach the semi-finals. He then defeated Mark Davis 9–4 to progress to the final, where he beat Shaun Murphy 10–6 to win the tournament.

Selby also participated at the Players Tour Championship. He successfully defended his Paul Hunter Classic title with a 4–1 win over Joe Swail in the final. He then lost in the final of the Antwerp Open 1–4 against Mark Allen, and won the Munich Open by defeating Graeme Dott 3–4 in the final. He then finished number one on the Order of Merit, and qualified for the Finals, where he lost 3–4 against Jack Lisowski.

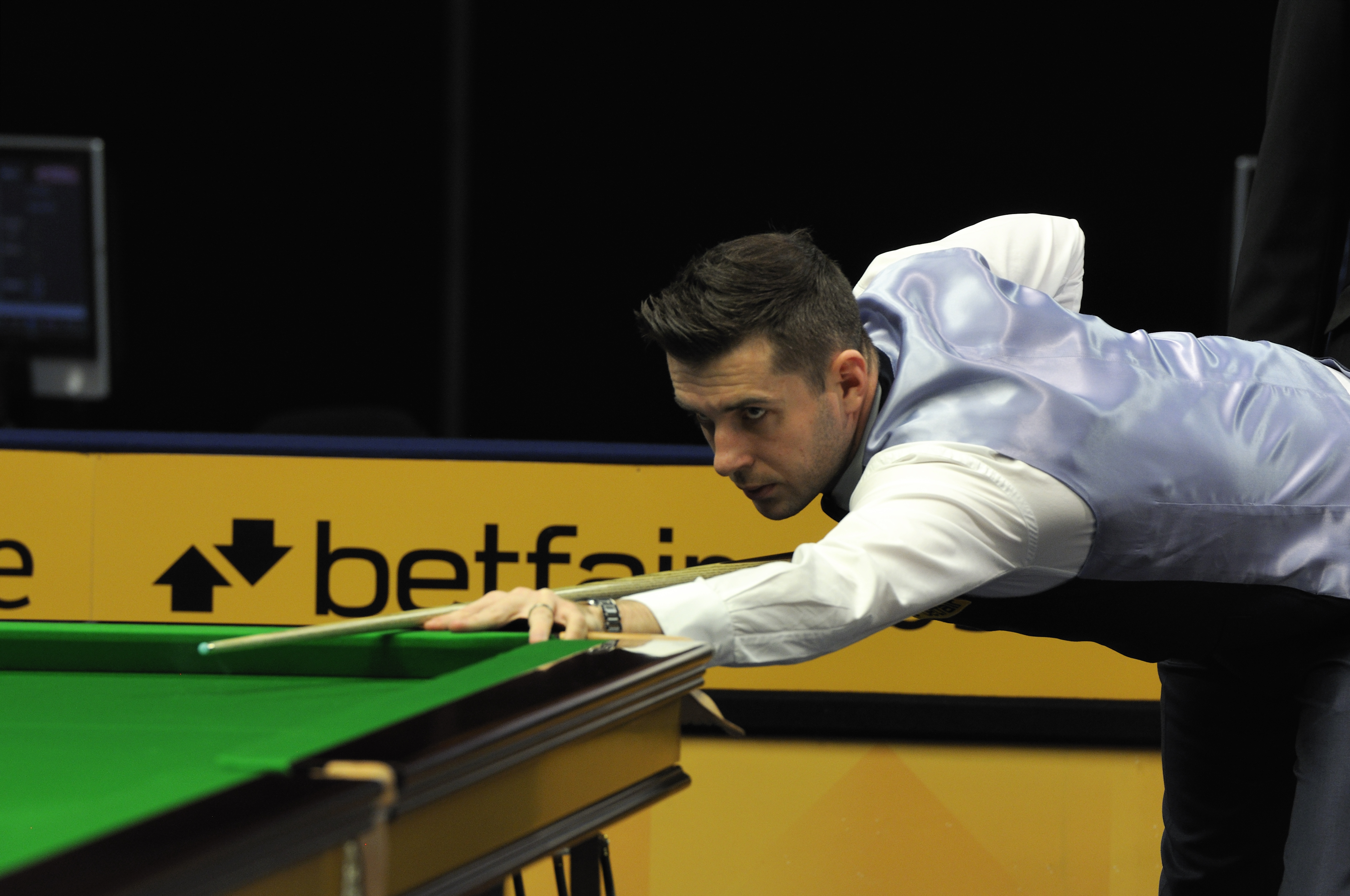
Selby at the 2013 German Masters

Selby then won his third Masters title, beating Stuart Bingham 6–5 from 1–5 behind in the first round, Mark Williams 6–1 in the quarter-finals, and Graeme Dott 6–5 from 1–4 behind in the semi-finals. He then defeated defending champion Neil Robertson 10–6 in the final. He reached the quarter-finals of the German Masters, but lost 1–5 against Barry Hawkins. He lost in the last 32 of the Welsh Open 0–4 against Joe Perry, and lost his number one position to Judd Trump. Selby then reached the quarter-finals of the World Open, but lost 3–5 against Neil Robertson.

At the China Open, Selby became the fourth player in history to miss the final black on a 147 attempt, and only the second – after Ken Doherty – to do so in a televised match, in a 5–1 defeat of Mark King. He then reached the final by defeating Ricky Walden 5–2, Mark Williams 5–1 and Shaun Murphy 6–2, but lost 6–10 against Neil Robertson. After the event he regained the number one spot from Judd Trump. He finished off the season at the World Championship, where he beat Matthew Selt 10–4 in the first round, before losing 10–13 to Barry Hawkins in the second round.

=== 2013–14 season: first World Championship ===
In the first ranking event of the season, Selby suffered a 3–5 defeat to Andrew Pagett in the qualifying rounds of the Wuxi Classic in China. The tournament was the first to use a new format requiring the top 16 players to compete in the qualifying rounds at most ranking events. In minor-ranking tournaments, he was runner-up at the Yixing Open, losing 1–4 to Joe Perry, and at the Rotterdam Open, where he lost 3–4 to Mark Williams. He won the Antwerp Open in November, defeating Ronnie O'Sullivan 4–3 in the final.

Having won the UK Championship and Masters in the previous season, Selby qualified to take part in the first edition of the revived Champion of Champions competition, where he lost to Stuart Bingham in the semi-finals 4–6. Defending his title at the UK Championship in December, Selby compiled snooker's 100th officially recognised maximum break in professional competition, in the seventh frame of his semi-final against Ricky Walden. He received £55,000 for the achievement, in addition to the tournament's highest break prize of £4,000. The next day, he lost 7–10 to world number one Neil Robertson in the final, having been ahead 5–1 and 6–3, missing his chance to regain the top position in the world rankings.

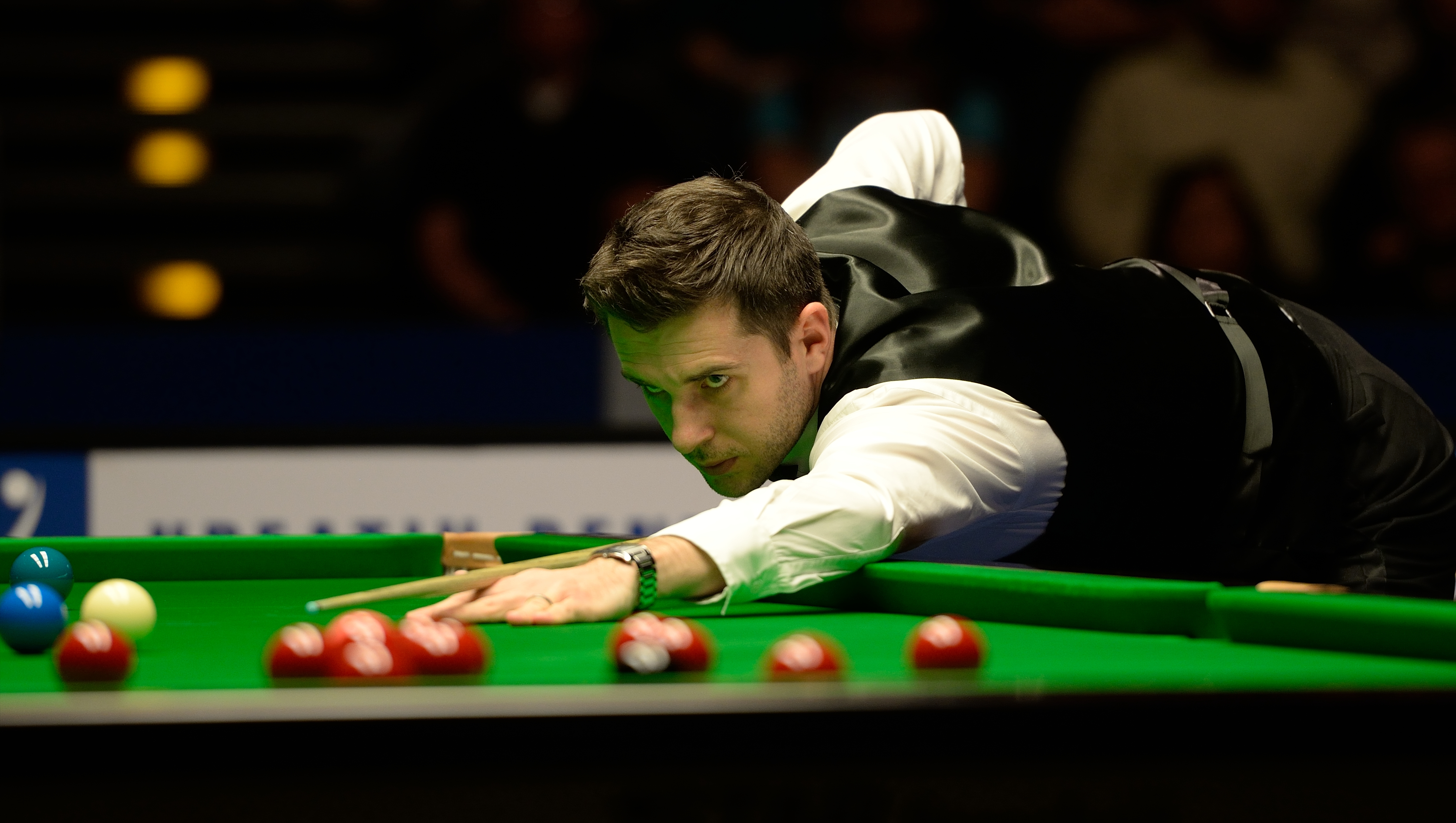
Selby at 2014 German Masters

He began the defence of his title at the Masters by defeating Mark Davis in the first round and John Higgins in the quarter-finals, winning both matches 6–5 and extending his unbeaten record in deciding frames at the Masters to 11. He then beat Shaun Murphy 6–1 in the semi-finals to reach the final against Ronnie O'Sullivan. After falling behind 1–7 in the first session, Selby lost the final 4–10, receiving the runner-up prize of £90,000. At the German Masters two weeks later, he was eliminated in the second round by Kurt Maflin 5–3. He defeated Alan McManus 5–1 in the quarter-finals of the World Open, and Marco Fu 6–4 in the semi-finals, but lost 6–10 in the final to Shaun Murphy.

At the World Championship, Selby defeated Michael White 10–9, Ali Carter 13–9, and Alan McManus 13–5 to reach his first semi-final at the Crucible since 2010, where he met Neil Robertson in a repeat of the UK Championship final five months earlier. This time Selby achieved a 17–15 victory to reach his second World Championship final and first for seven years. His opponent in the final was defending champion Ronnie O'Sullivan, who had held the world title for the past two years and had won all five of his previous world finals. Selby appeared "jaded" on the first day after a tough semi-final battle with Robertson the day before. O'Sullivan led 3–0, 8–3, and 10–5, but Selby then won six frames in a row to lead for the first time, eventually sealing an 18–14 victory for his first world title. He dedicated the win to his late father who had died when Selby was 16. With his World Championship victory, Selby became the ninth player to win snooker's Triple Crown of World, UK and Masters titles; he also returned to the world number one position.

=== 2014–15 season ===
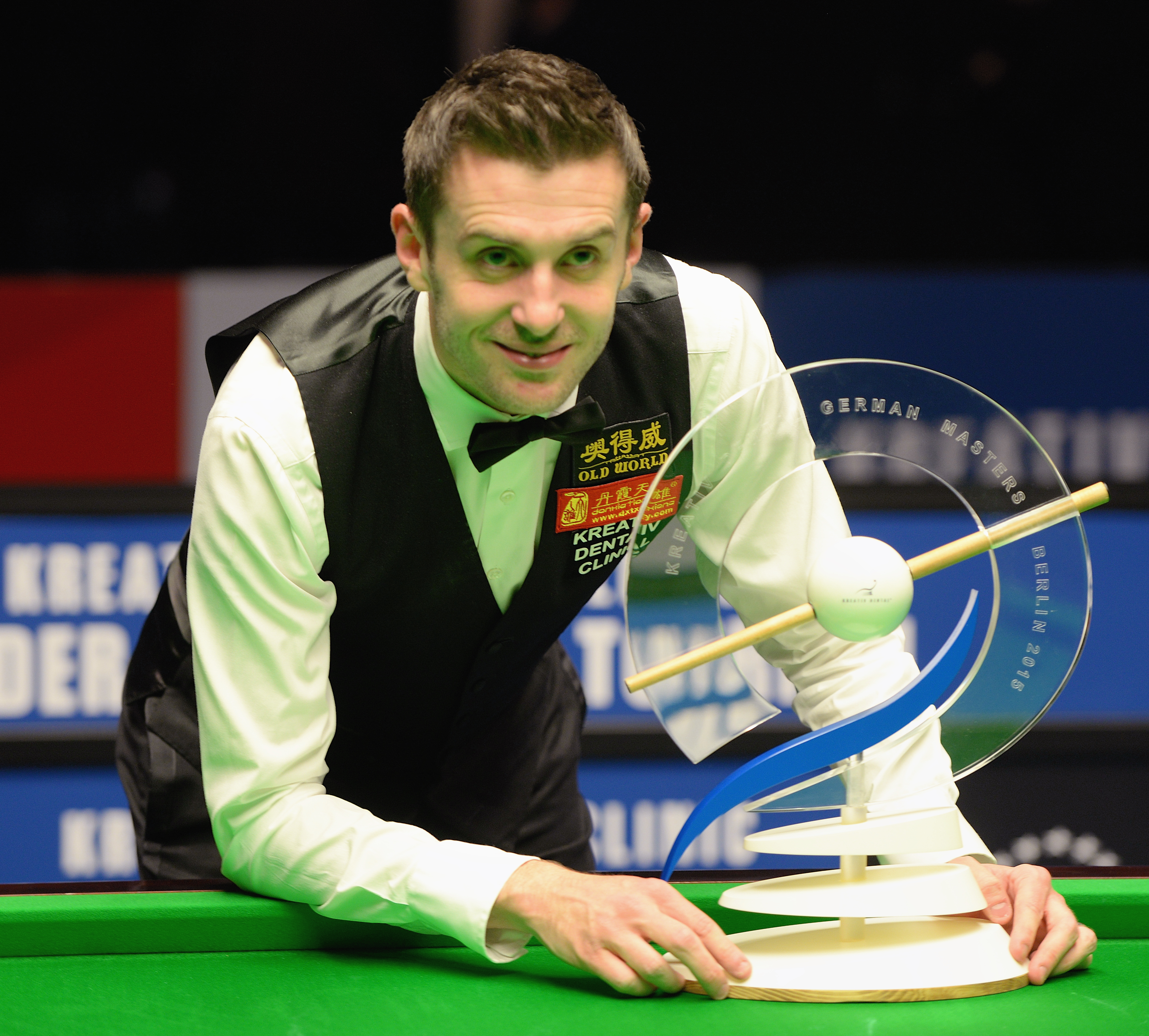
Selby with 2015 German Masters trophy

At the first ranking event of the season, the Wuxi Classic, Selby lost 3–5 to Liang Wenbo in the last 32. He won the minor-ranking Riga Open in August, defeating Mark Allen 4–3 in the final, but was defeated by Allen the following month in a final-frame decider in the semi-finals of the ranking Shanghai Masters tournament. He made an unexpected early exit from the ranking International Championship, when he was eliminated in the last 128 by 19-year-old tour rookie Oliver Lines, who had recovered from 0–4 behind to defeat him 6–4. Selby reached the quarter-finals of the invitational Champion of Champions tournament in November, but lost 1–6 against Judd Trump. He had a disappointing run at the UK Championship, losing 4–6 to David Morris in the last 64.

In his first-round encounter with Shaun Murphy at the Masters in January, Selby fell 1–5 behind before recovering to draw level at 5–5, but then lost the match in the deciding frame. This was the first time he had ever lost a deciding frame at the Masters, having won the match 6–5 on all 11 previous occasions. The following month, Selby won his fifth ranking title at the German Masters. He defeated Judd Trump 5–4 in the quarter-finals, despite Trump making his second career 147 in the fifth frame of the match; this was the fifth time that Selby had witnessed an opponent completing a maximum against him (including both of Trump's), the most witnessed by any player. In the final, he came from 2–5 down against Shaun Murphy to win 9–7 and claim the title.

At the China Open in April, Selby became the first player to win a second ranking title in the 2014–15 season; after advancing to the final without meeting any player inside the world's top 16, he outplayed world number 56 Gary Wilson to win 10–2. He then began his title defence at the World Championship, with no first-time world champion having successfully defended the title the following year, and no winner of the China Open having won the World Championship in the same season. He led Kurt Maflin 8–4 in the first round, before Maflin won the next five frames to lead 9–8, but Selby took the 18th frame and the decider to win the match 10–9. His reign as World Champion ended in the second round, however, with a 9–13 defeat to Anthony McGill. Despite this setback, he finished the season as world number one for the fourth year running.

=== 2015–16 season: second World Championship ===
At the 2015 International Championship, Selby reached the semi-finals but then lost 4–9 to John Higgins. He did not drop a frame in reaching the third round of the UK Championship where he defeated Jamie Jones 6–5, later acknowledging that his opponent had deserved to win the match. He then eliminated Dechawat Poomjaeng and Matthew Selt both 6–1, before being whitewashed 6–0 by Neil Robertson in the semi-finals. In early 2016, Selby lost to Ronnie O'Sullivan in the quarter-finals of both the Masters and Welsh Open, but won the Gdynia Open with a 4–1 victory over Martin Gould.

In March, he withdrew from the PTC Finals and China Open for personal reasons. Returning to the tour at the World Championship in April, he beat Robert Milkins 10–6, Sam Baird 13–11, and Kyren Wilson 13–8, to face Marco Fu in the semi-finals. Selby drew level at 12–12 after winning a 76-minute frame, the longest in Crucible history, and won the match 17–15 with a successful snooker on the brown ball in the final frame. He took an early 6–0 lead over Ding Junhui in the final, eventually winning the match 18–14 to claim his second world title. With his World Championship victory, Selby finished at number one in the world rankings for the fifth consecutive year.

=== 2016–17 season: second UK Championship; third World Championship ===
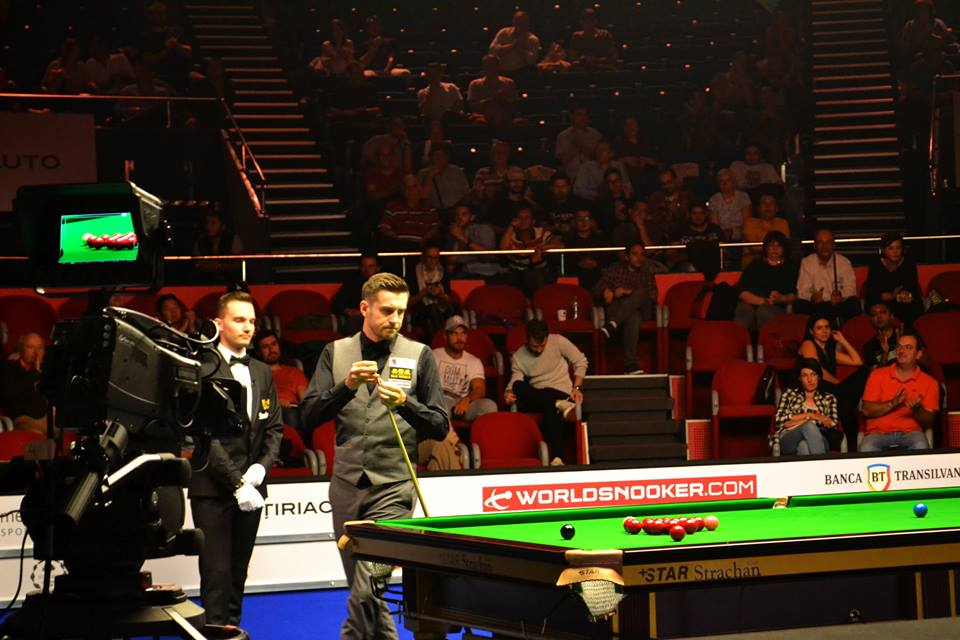
Selby at 2016 European Masters in Bucharest, Romania

Selby won his first ranking title of the season at the Paul Hunter Classic, beating Tom Ford 4–2 in the final. His semi-final against Stuart Bingham at the Shanghai Masters in September, was a meeting between the top-two ranked players in the world, Selby winning 6–5, having trailed 3–5. After taking an early 3–1 advantage over Ding Junhui in the final, he eventually lost the match 6–10. The following month, he was defeated 2–6 by Judd Trump in the semi-finals of the European Masters. He then won 9–3 in another semi-final encounter with Bingham, to reach the final of the International Championship in Daqing, China, winning the event for the first time by overcoming Ding 10–1; Selby dominated their encounter, winning all of the last seven frames, in the most one-sided ranking event final since the 2012 World Open when Mark Allen had defeated Stephen Lee by the same scoreline. Selby made seven 50+ breaks, while Ding's highest was just 47.

At the UK Championship, he defeated John Higgins 6–5 in a high-quality quarter-final match that lasted five hours; Selby won on the colours in the deciding frame. After despatching Shaun Murphy 6–2 in the semi-finals, he developed a 7–2 advantage over Ronnie O'Sullivan in the final of the event, which decreased to 7–4, followed by four breaks of 130 or more over the next five frames—two by each player—bringing the score to 9–7 in Selby's favour. He finished the match with a 107 break to claim his second UK title, completing the second Triple Crown of his career. After failing to progress to the semi-final stage of any of the next seven tournaments, he made it through to the final of the China Open in April, where he took the final three frames against Mark Williams to win 10–8 and claim his fourth ranking title of the season.

In the quarter-finals of the World Championship, he defeated Marco Fu 13–3 with a session to spare. He faced Ding Junhui in the semi-finals, taking a 16–13 lead before Ding closed the gap to 15–16 behind; Selby then won the 32nd frame to reach his third world final in four years. In a repeat of the 2007 final against John Higgins, which Selby had lost 13–18, he fell behind 4–10 before recovering to win 12 of the next 14 frames, eventually closing out the match 18–15 to win his third World Championship, becoming the fourth player—after Steve Davis, Stephen Hendry and Ronnie O'Sullivan—to retain the world title at the Crucible. This was Selby's fifth ranking title of the season, tying him with Hendry and Ding as the only players to have won five ranking events in a single season. Selby earned £932,000 during the 2016–17 season, a record amount of prize money for any one season.

=== 2017–18 season ===
In the 2017–18 snooker season, Selby was eliminated in the first round of the Hong Kong Masters after a 3–5 defeat to eventual champion Neil Robertson. His first ranking tournament of the season was the China Championship where he was defeated 4–5 by Zhou Yuelong in the second round. He failed to progress past the fourth round of the Paul Hunter Classic in defence of his title, losing 1–4 to eventual champion Michael White. He was defeated 2–5 by Lee Walker in the first round of the World Open, followed by a 2–4 defeat to Stuart Bingham in the quarter-finals of the European Masters, and a third round exit at the English Open where he lost 1–4 to Xiao Guodong.

Selby successfully defended his International Championship title in November, to claim his first ranking title of the season. After surviving a fightback from Mark Allen, who trailed 3–8 and 7–9 in the final, Selby prevailed 10–7. As reigning World Snooker Champion, he qualified automatically for the 2017 Champion of Champions, but was defeated 4–6 in the quarter-finals by Luca Brecel. Defending his title at the UK Championship, he was eliminated 3–6 by Scott Donaldson in the last 64.

In January, he played Mark Williams in the first round of the Masters, in a repeat of the previous year's event, where Selby had won their first-round encounter 6–5. However, this time the finishing score line was reversed as Selby lost the deciding frame 5–6. He retained his China Open championship in April, defeating Barry Hawkins 11–3 in the final. This was Selby's third China Open title in four years. Later that month, his two-year reign as World Champion ended in the first round of the World Championship, where he fell to Joe Perry 4–10, unable to recover from a 2–7 deficit in the first session. In winning the match, Perry became the first player to beat Selby at the World Championship since Anthony McGill had defeated him in the second round in 2015. Despite this disappointment, Selby still finished the season as world number one.

=== 2018–19 season ===
At the World Open in August, Selby lost 4–5 to world number 53 Noppon Saengkham in the last 16, losing the deciding frame by just three points. He won his 15th ranking title at the China Championship in September, defeating John Higgins 10–9 in a very close-fought final. He reached the semi-finals of the Northern Ireland Open in November, losing 5–6 to Ronnie O'Sullivan on the final black. He faced disappointments in other tournaments too, including an unexpected 3–6 loss to amateur James Cahill in the first round of the UK Championship. At the 2019 Masters, he lost 2–6 to Judd Trump in a "nervy" quarter-final, despite making a 110 break in the seventh frame of the match.

Selby lost the top ranking position to Ronnie O'Sullivan on 24 March 2019, having been world number one since February 2015. O'Sullivan reclaimed the top spot by winning his 36th ranking title at the Tour Championship; Selby had himself been eliminated in the first round by Neil Robertson in a final-frame decider, after squandering a four-frame lead. He had an opportunity to regain the top spot at the China Open less than two weeks later, but lost 3–6 to Craig Steadman in the qualifying round which had been held over from the original qualification stage in February. At the World Championship, Selby beat Zhao Xintong 10–7 in the first round before being defeated 10–13 by Gary Wilson in the second round. As a result of this mediocre performance, he ended the season as world number six, having also been outranked by John Higgins, Neil Robertson, Mark Williams and Judd Trump.

=== 2019–20 season ===
In the 2019–20 season, Selby reached the semi-finals of the International Championship, losing 4–9 to Judd Trump, and in defending his title at the China Championship, he lost 3–6 to Shaun Murphy, again in the semi-finals. He defeated David Gilbert 9–1 in the final to win the English Open. The following week, he lost 2–5 to Stuart Bingham in the last 16 of the World Open. In the Champion of Champions, he fell short 2–6 to Mark Allen in the group final. Despite recovering from 1–4 behind to tie at 4–4, he was defeated in the quarter-finals of the Northern Ireland Open by John Higgins. He took more than six minutes to play one of his shots in the seventh frame of this match, leading to criticism from the Eurosport commentator Neal Foulds. He won the Scottish Open in December, beating Jack Lisowski 9–6 in the final. Having also won the English Open earlier in the season, he became the first player to win more than one tournament in the Home Nations Series in a single season.

At the beginning of 2020, he lost in the first round of the Masters against Ali Carter in January, and failed to qualify at the German Masters later the same month. At the European Masters, he lost in the second round to Barry Hawkins; after losing the first four frames, he staged a comeback to level at 4–4 but then lost the deciding frame. He qualified for the World Grand Prix, where he lost 3–4 to Xiao Guodong in the first round despite making two centuries. In February, Selby reached the quarter-final stage of the last Home Nations event, the Welsh Open, where he was defeated 1–5 by Ronnie O'Sullivan. He also qualified for the Players Championship, based on the one-year ranking list; in the first round, he whitewashed Mark Williams 6–0, but was then knocked out in the quarter-finals by Stephen Maguire in a deciding frame 5–6. In March, he also participated at the Gibraltar Open, but was eliminated in the third round by Lyu Haotian 1–4.

After the prolonged break caused by the COVID-19 pandemic, Selby participated in the 2020 Championship League, going out of the tournament after the first group stage. He qualified for the 2020 Tour Championship ranked third on the one-year ranking list. He beat Yan Bingtao 9–6 in the quarter-finals before being defeated 2–9 by Mark Allen in the semi-finals. At the World Championship, Selby defeated debutant Jordan Brown 10–6 in the first round, Noppon Saengkham 13–12 in the last 16, and Neil Robertson 13–7 in the quarter-finals. In the semi-final, he met Ronnie O'Sullivan, who took a 5–3 lead after the first session, but Selby won the second session to take a 9–7 lead. During the third session, he established a 13–9 advantage before O'Sullivan won the last two frames of the session. Selby then took a 16–14 lead, leaving himself one frame away from his fifth World Championship final, but he lost the final three frames of the match. After the game, Selby accused his opponent of being "disrespectful" after O'Sullivan had played several hit-and-hope shots while being snookered. Selby finished the season as world number four.

=== 2020–21 season: fourth World Championship ===
After the delayed start to the new season, Selby won his 18th ranking title at the 2020 European Masters in September, defeating Martin Gould 9–8 in the final. The score was level at 4–4 by the end of the afternoon session, despite Selby taking an early 4–0 lead. The two players were evenly matched throughout the evening session, but Selby eventually won the match in the deciding final frame with a break of 72. The win moved him to a joint sixth place, alongside Neil Robertson, on the list of players with the most world ranking titles.

In October, he began the defence of his title at the 2020 English Open. After defeating Fan Zhengyi, Chang Bingyu, Liang Wenbo, Hossein Vafaei and Zhou Yuelong, he lost 5–6 to Neil Robertson in the semi-finals. Despite losing the title, Selby retained the number one spot in the one-year ranking list. He also progressed through the first two group stages of the ranking Championship League tournament, but in the third group stage, although he beat Judd Trump 3–0, he lost 1–3 to Zhou Yuelong and 0–3 to Zhao Xintong, finishing at the bottom of the group.

At the 2020 Champion of Champions tournament in November, Selby recovered from 0–4 and 3–5 behind, winning the last three frames of his quarter-final match against Kyren Wilson to progress 6–5, only to be defeated by Neil Robertson in another final-frame decider at the semi-final stage of the competition. In December, after yet another loss to Robertson at the quarter-finals of the 2020 UK Championship, Selby successfully defended his Scottish Open title, beating Yuan Sijun, Nigel Bond, Mark Joyce, Lyu Haotian, Ricky Walden and Jamie Jones to reach the final, then defeating Ronnie O'Sullivan 9–3 to claim his 19th ranking tournament win, and his third Home Nations Series trophy, becoming the second player, after Judd Trump, to win three Home Nations events. The following week, he reached the semi-finals of the 2020 World Grand Prix, where he was defeated 4–6 by Jack Lisowski, despite compiling the highest break of the tournament, a 143 in the seventh frame of the match.

Selby reached the final of the 2021 Snooker Shoot Out in February, but his early 24-point lead was eclipsed by Ryan Day's 67-point winning break in the last four minutes of the match. Though he was aiming to secure a record 12th successive ranking final win at the event, Selby expressed doubts whether the Shoot Out should be classed as a ranking event. Afterwards, he exited both the Welsh Open and the Players Championship at the quarter-final stage, then the 2021 Tour Championship with one more semi-final defeat by Neil Robertson, repeating his last year results for all three events.

Selby won his fourth world title in May 2021, defeating Shaun Murphy 18–15 in the final of the 2021 World Championship in front of a capacity crowd at the Crucible Theatre. He became one of only five players to have won the championship four or more times at the Crucible, and said in his post-match interview: "to win it four times is something I could only have dreamed of."

=== 2021–22 season ===
In contrast with his last two snooker years, this was a poor season for Selby. His first tournament was the 2021 British Open. He was defeated in the second round, but returned to the top of the rankings for the first time since March 2019. After that, he suffered many early round exits, failed to qualify for tournaments or has withdrawn from them. Selby said that snooker seemed "irrelevant right now" to him, as he spoke about his struggles with depression that was affecting his life and snooker form. He reached the semi-finals of the 2021 World Grand Prix in December though, but after levelling the match at 2–2, he was defeated 3–6 by Neil Robertson. The only other highlights of the season were his quarter-final appearances at the 2021 Champion of Champions, where he made his 700th century break in his opening match against David Gilbert, becoming the sixth player to reach that milestone, and the 2022 Masters, where Selby avenged his 6–3 loss to Stephen Maguire from last year's tournament by beating the Scotsman by the exact same scoreline, but then he suffered a 6–1 defeat by Barry Hawkins.

=== 2022–23 season ===
Compared to his last season performance, Selby's form had improved, as he was in the final of the 2022 World Mixed Doubles, teamed up with Rebecca Kenna, though they ended up losing 2–4 to Neil Robertson and Mink Nutcharut; then he reached the quarter-finals of the British, the Northern Ireland and the Scottish Open, and the semi-finals of the 2022 Champion of Champions. After that, he went on and became the first player to win the English Open for the second time, claiming his first ranking trophy since his World Championship win in 2021, and becoming the second player, after Judd Trump, to win four Home Nations tournaments. In the semi-final of the tournament, he also recorded his first win over Neil Robertson in two years, after seven consecutive losses to him, including this year's Northern Ireland and Scottish Open defeats. Towards the end of the season, Selby also won the inaugural 2023 WST Classic tournament, beating Pang Junxu 6–2 in the final. In the next event, the 2023 Tour Championship, he made it to the semi-final, losing 9–10 to Shaun Murphy, forcing a decider after being 6–9 down.

At the 2023 World Snooker Championship, Selby defeated Mark Allen 17–15 in a semi-final that lasted for over 13 1/2 hours in total, with the final session ending at 12:48 a.m. In frame 16 of the final against Luca Brecel, Selby scored a maximum break, his first maximum at the Crucible, and the first ever compiled in a World Championship final. Trailing 16–10 at one point, Selby managed to close the gap to 16–15; however Brecel won the following two frames to win 18–15.

=== 2023–24 season ===
At the start of the season, Selby was a semi-finalist in the 2023 European Masters and the 2023 Shanghai Masters, losing 4–6 to Barry Hawkins in the former, and 7–10 to Ronnie O'Sullivan in the latter tournament. Then he reached the final of the 2023 British Open, facing Mark Williams and eventually losing to him 10–7, despite coming back from 5–1 down to 8–7 throughout the match. Going that far in the tournament took its toll, as in the next event, the 2023 English Open, Selby won his held-over qualifying match, but then he lost 4–2 to world number 104 Martin O'Donnell in the last 64, having played nine matches in nine days altogether. He also exited in the last 64 round at the following 2023 Wuhan Open, losing 4–5 to Xu Si. His last notable result for the calendar year was reaching the quarter-finals of the 2023 UK Championship, where he lost 3–6 to Judd Trump.

During the first half of the season, Selby has missed out on the 2023 Northern Ireland Open, as he—along with Ali Carter, John Higgins, Thepchaiya Un-Nooh and reigning world champion Luca Brecel—opted not to enter, so he could play at an exhibition event in Macau, China instead, originally scheduled to take place from 27 to 29 October. The World Snooker Tour threatened the five players with disciplinary action, claiming that playing at an unsanctioned event in Macau rather than at an official tour event in Belfast would breach their players' contract. Following negotiations, the Macau exhibition was rescheduled to be played from 22 to 24 December, and the WST granted the concerned players permission to participate; however, they remained absent from the Belfast tournament, as they had not entered it. Selby won the Macau event, defeating Carter 6–3 in the final, and he also made a maximum break in his semi-final match against Higgins.

In January, Selby exited both the 2024 Masters and the 2024 World Grand Prix at the quarter-finals stage, losing 5–6 to Mark Allen in the former, and 1–5 to Judd Trump in the latter tournament. Then, in his qualifying match for the 2024 World Open against Xing Zihao, he compiled the 800th century of his professional career. At the end of February, he made it to the semi-final of the 2024 Players Championship with a 6–0 whitewash over Ronnie O'Sullivan, but there he got edged out 5–6 by Zhang Anda. In the next event, the 2024 World Masters of Snooker, he was a quarter-finalist, but suffered a 3–4 loss to Mark Allen after leading 3–1, but spoiling his match-winning chances by missing the black off its spot twice in the next two frames. The following week, Selby won the 2024 Championship League by defeating Joe O'Connor 3–1, lifting his first trophy of the season, almost a year after his last tour event success. Later on, he participated in the 2024 World Mixed Doubles, replacing Mark Allen, who withdrew. Selby was once again paired with Rebecca Kenna, and as in 2022, they were the runner-ups, losing 2–4 again to Luca Brecel and Reanne Evans in the final. Selby's season ended in the first round of the 2024 World Snooker Championship as he faced Joe O'Connor again and was defeated 6–10 by him. After the loss, Selby considered that he might retire from snooker.

=== 2024–25 season ===
In September, Selby reached the quarter-finals at the English Open, where he suffered a shock 4–5 loss to world number 77 Ishpreet Singh Chadha. The following week, he won the British Open, defeating John Higgins 10–5 in the final to claim his first ranking tournament title since March 2023.

Selby defeated Stephen Maguire 9–6 to win the Welsh Open in February. It was the second time he had taken the title, having previously been champion in 2008. It was also his 24th ranking event title. Selby reached the final of the 2025 Tour Championship, where despite holding an 8‍–‍5 lead against John Higgins, he eventually lost 8–10. Selby suffered a first round exit at the 2025 World Championship, after he was defeated 8–10 by Ben Woollaston.

=== 2025–26 season: third UK Championship ===
In November, Selby won the Champion of Champions for the first time. Held in his hometown of Leicester, he overcame Judd Trump 10–5 in the final. A month later, Selby won the UK Championship for the third time, defeating Trump 10–8 in the final. His tenth triple crown title moved him ahead of John Higgins into fourth place for career victories in triple crown events. The following month, at the 2026 Masters, Selby exited in the first round after a defeat to Xiao Guodong. In February, he was triumphant at the invitational Championship League after defeating Wu Yize 3–1 in the final. It was his third consecutive overall victory in the event. At the Tour Championship in April, he suffered a quarter-finals defeat to Higgins. Selby was beaten 11–13 by Wu Yize in the second round of the 2026 World Championship.

=== 2026–27 season ===
At the 2026 China Open, Selby defeated Noppon Saengkham 10–6 to win the title for a fourth time and secure the 26th ranking-event victory of his career. The following month, he was defeated 6–10 by Jak Jones in the final of the British Open.

== Personal life ==
Born in Leicester on 19 June 1983, Selby began playing pool at the age of eight and snooker aged nine. Malcolm Thorne, brother of Leicester-born snooker player Willie Thorne, spotted Selby's snooker ability and offered him free practice at his brother's snooker club, which Selby took full advantage of, practising in the evenings after school. Abandoned by his mother at the age of eight, Selby lost his father to cancer when he was 16, after which he lived with family friend and snooker coach, Alan Perkins. He contemplated suicide after his father's death, but Perkins encouraged him to devote himself to snooker, telling him his father would have wanted him to keep playing and trying his best. Two months later, Selby joined the main professional tour, having left school with no qualifications. His nickname, "The Jester from Leicester", was given to him by snooker compere Richard Beare because Selby liked to have "a laugh and a joke" with him.

Selby's wife Vikki Layton, who often attends his major matches, is a former Irish international pool player born in Ipswich. They began dating in 2006 after meeting on the professional circuit. They became engaged in August 2010 after Selby proposed on a gondola in Venice, and were married in Cancún, Mexico in May 2011. They have one daughter who was born in 2014.

Selby has been a fan of Leicester City F.C. since childhood. His 2014 World Championship victory happened on the day that Leicester City celebrated their promotion to the Premier League with an open-top bus parade. Two years later, he won his second world title just 13 minutes after the team sealed their first Premier League title. Selby is also a fan of darts and has played in exhibition matches at Ibstock in Leicestershire, beating Eric Bristow in 2007 and taking on Raymond van Barneveld in 2009.

Selby was appointed Member of the Order of the British Empire (MBE) in the 2022 Birthday Honours for services to snooker and charity.

== Performance and rankings timeline ==
Below is a list of competition results for professional seasons starting from 1999.

Tournament	1999/ 00	2000/ 01	2001/ 02	2002/ 03	2003/ 04	2004/ 05	2005/ 06	2006/ 07	2007/ 08	2008/ 09	2009/ 10	2010/ 11	2011/ 12	2012/ 13	2013/ 14	2014/ 15	2015/ 16	2016/ 17	2017/ 18	2018/ 19	2019/ 20		2020/ 21	2021/ 22	2022/ 23	2023/ 24	2024/ 25	2025/ 26	2026/ 27
Ranking (Note: It shows the ranking at the beginning of the season)	(Note: New players on the Main Tour do not have a ranking)	122	95	53	29	36	39	28	11	4	7	9	3	1	1	1	1	1	1	1	6		4	2	3	5	6	7	9
Ranking tournaments
Championship League	Tournament Not Held								Non-Ranking Event														3R	A	RR	A	A	A	A
China Open	LQ	LQ	SF	Not Held		LQ	1R	2R	SF	2R	2R	F	WD	F	QF	W	WD	W	W	LQ	Tournament Not Held								W
Wuhan Open	Tournament Not Held																									1R	LQ	3R	QF
British Open	1R	LQ	LQ	LQ	1R	1R	Tournament Not Held																	2R	QF	F	W	SF	F
English Open	Tournament Not Held																	2R	3R	2R	W		SF	3R	W	1R	QF	SF	3R
Shenzhen Open (Note: The event was called the Xi'an Grand Prix (2024/2025–2025/2026))	Tournament Not Held																										3R	1R	QF
Northern Ireland Open	Tournament Not Held																	A	A	SF	QF		2R	3R	QF	A	1R	2R	1R
International Championship	Tournament Not Held													2R	QF	LQ	SF	W	W	QF	SF		Not Held			3R	3R	QF	2R
UK Championship	1R	LQ	LQ	2R	1R	2R	LQ	2R	SF	1R	QF	2R	2R	W	F	2R	SF	W	2R	1R	4R		QF	2R	1R	QF	1R	W	
Shoot Out	Tournament Not Held											Non-Ranking Event						A	A	A	1R		F	3R	1R	A	SF	A	
Scottish Open (Note: The event was called the Players Championship (2003/2004))	LQ	LQ	1R	F	1R	Tournament Not Held								MR	Not Held			A	A	A	W		W	3R	QF	2R	2R	QF	
German Masters	Tournament Not Held											F	QF	QF	2R	W	2R	2R	1R	2R	LQ		LQ	2R	LQ	LQ	2R	1R	
Welsh Open	LQ	LQ	1R	1R	2R	LQ	3R	3R	W	QF	QF	SF	F	1R	QF	4R	QF	3R	2R	4R	QF		QF	1R	2R	1R	W	1R	
World Grand Prix	Tournament Not Held															NR	1R	1R	SF	QF	1R		SF	SF	1R	QF	QF	2R	
Players Championship (Note: The event was called the Players Tour Championship Grand Final (2010/2011–2015/2016))	Tournament Not Held											SF	QF	1R	1R	2R	WD	QF	1R	1R	QF		QF	DNQ	1R	SF	QF	QF	
World Open (Note: The event was called the Grand Prix (1999/2000–2000/2001 and 2004/2005–2009/2010) and the LG Cup (2001/2002–2003/2004))	1R	LQ	LQ	LQ	1R	QF	1R	2R	RR	2R	1R	LQ	SF	QF	F	Not Held		2R	1R	3R	3R		Not Held			3R	1R	WD	
Tour Championship	Tournament Not Held																			QF	SF		SF	DNQ	SF	1R	F	QF	
World Championship	LQ	LQ	LQ	LQ	LQ	1R	2R	F	1R	QF	SF	QF	1R	2R	W	2R	W	W	1R	2R	SF		W	2R	F	1R	1R	2R	
Non-ranking tournaments
Shanghai Masters	Tournament Not Held								Ranking Event											QF	2R		Not Held			SF	SF	SF	1R
Champion of Champions	Tournament Not Held														SF	QF	1R	QF	QF	1R	QF		SF	QF	SF	1R	QF	W	QF
Riyadh Season Championship (Note: The event was called the World Masters of Snooker (2023/2024))	Tournament Not Held																									QF	QF	A	
The Masters	LQ	LQ	LQ	LQ	LQ	A	LQ	LQ	W	F	W	1R	QF	W	F	1R	QF	QF	1R	QF	1R		1R	QF	1R	QF	QF	1R	
Championship League	Tournament Not Held								F	F	RR	2R	RR	RR	RR	A	2R	RR	SF	2R	WD	RR	RR	WD	WD	W	W	W	
Former ranking tournaments
Malta Grand Prix	LQ	NR	Tournament Not Held																										
Thailand Masters	LQ	LQ	LQ	NR	Not Held			NR	Tournament Not Held																				
Irish Masters	Non-Ranking Event			1R	1R	1R	NH	NR	Tournament Not Held																				
Northern Ireland Trophy	Tournament Not Held						NR	3R	2R	3R	Tournament Not Held																		
Wuxi Classic (Note: The event was called the Jiangsu Classic (2008/2009–2009/2010))	Tournament Not Held									Non-Ranking Event				QF	LQ	2R	Tournament Not Held												
Australian Goldfields Open	Tournament Not Held												QF	1R	SF	A	2R	Tournament Not Held											
Shanghai Masters	Tournament Not Held								SF	SF	1R	SF	W	1R	QF	SF	WD	F	3R	Non-Ranking			Not Held			Non-Ranking Event			
Paul Hunter Classic (Note: The event was called the Grand Prix Fürth (2004/2005) and the Fürth German Open (2005/2006–2006/2007))	Tournament Not Held					Pro-am Event						Minor-Ranking Event						W	4R	A	NR		Tournament Not Held						
Indian Open	Tournament Not Held														2R	A	NH	A	A	A	Tournament Not Held								
Riga Masters (Note: The event was called the Riga Open (2014/2015–2015/2016))	Tournament Not Held															Minor-Rank		1R	WD	A	3R		Tournament Not Held						
China Championship	Tournament Not Held																	NR	2R	W	SF		Tournament Not Held						
WST Pro Series	Tournament Not Held																						2R	Tournament Not Held					
Gibraltar Open	Tournament Not Held																MR	3R	A	A	3R		3R	A	Tournament Not Held				
WST Classic	Tournament Not Held																								W	Tournament Not Held			
European Masters (Note: The event was called the European Open (2001/2002–2003/2004) and the Malta Cup (2004/2005–2007/2008))	Not Held		LQ	LQ	LQ	LQ	LQ	LQ	NR	Tournament Not Held								SF	QF	3R	2R		W	1R	LQ	SF	Not Held		
Saudi Arabia Masters	Tournament Not Held																										5R	6R	NH
Former non-ranking tournaments
Warsaw Snooker Tour	Tournament Not Held								W	Tournament Not Held																			
Malta Cup	Not Held		Ranking Event						RR	Tournament Not Held								Ranking Event											
World Series Jersey	Tournament Not Held									F	Tournament Not Held																		
World Series Warsaw	Tournament Not Held									SF	Tournament Not Held																		
World Series Moscow	Tournament Not Held									SF	Tournament Not Held																		
World Series Grand Final	Tournament Not Held									QF	Tournament Not Held																		
Masters Qualifying Event (Note: The event was also called the Benson & Hedges Championship (1990/1991–2002/2003))	1R	1R	2R	1R	2R	NH	2R	F	A	A	A	Tournament Not Held																	
Wuxi Classic	Tournament Not Held									F	RR	1R	W	Ranking Event			Tournament Not Held												
Brazil Masters	Tournament Not Held												QF	Tournament Not Held															
Power Snooker	Tournament Not Held											QF	SF	Tournament Not Held															
Premier League	A	A	A	A	A	A	A	A	A	F	A	RR	A	RR	Tournament Not Held														
World Grand Prix	Tournament Not Held															2R	Ranking Event												
Shoot Out	Tournament Not Held											3R	2R	2R	1R	1R	A	Ranking Event											
China Championship	Tournament Not Held																	QF	Ranking Event										
Romanian Masters	Tournament Not Held																		1R	Tournament Not Held									
Hong Kong Masters	Tournament Not Held																		QF	Tournament Not Held					QF	Tournament Not Held			
Six-red World Championship (Note: The event was called the Six-red Snooker International (2008/2009) and the Six-red World Grand Prix (2009/2010))	Tournament Not Held									2R	A	W	NH	QF	SF	WD	QF	2R	A	2R	2R		Not Held		WD	Tournament Not Held			
Haining Open	Tournament Not Held															Minor-Rank		A	W	W	SF		NH	A	A	Tournament Not Held			

Performance Table Legend
LQ	lost in the qualifying draw	#R	lost in the early rounds of the tournament (WR = Wildcard round, RR = Round robin)	QF	lost in the quarter-finals
SF	lost in the semi-finals	F	lost in the final	W	won the tournament
DNQ	did not qualify for the tournament	A	did not participate in the tournament	WD	withdrew from the tournament

NH / Not Held	means an event was not held.
NR / Non-Ranking Event	means an event is/was no longer a ranking event.
R / Ranking Event	means an event is/was a ranking event.
MR / Minor-Ranking Event	means an event is/was a minor-ranking event.
PA / Pro-am Event	means an event is/was a pro-am event.

== Career finals ==
Below is a list of professional finals played by Selby.

=== Ranking finals: 40 (26 titles) ===
Legend
World Championship (4–2)
UK Championship (3–1)
Other (19–11)

Results in ranking finals
Outcome	No.	Year	Championship	Opponent in the final	Score
Runner-up	1.	2003	Scottish Open	(England) David Gray	7–9
Runner-up	2.	2007	World Snooker Championship	(Scotland) John Higgins	13–18
Winner	1.	2008	Welsh Open	(England) Ronnie O'Sullivan	9–8
Runner-up	3.	2011	German Masters	(Wales) Mark Williams	7–9
Runner-up	4.	2011	China Open	(England) Judd Trump	8–10
Winner	2.	2011	Shanghai Masters	(Wales) Mark Williams	10–9
Runner-up	5.	2012	Welsh Open	(China) Ding Junhui	6–9
Winner	3.	2012	UK Championship	(England) Shaun Murphy	10–6
Runner-up	6.	2013	China Open (2)	(Australia) Neil Robertson	6–10
Runner-up	7.	2013	UK Championship	(Australia) Neil Robertson	7–10
Runner-up	8.	2014	World Open	(England) Shaun Murphy	6–10
Winner	4.	2014	World Snooker Championship	(England) Ronnie O'Sullivan	18–14
Winner	5.	2015	German Masters	(England) Shaun Murphy	9–7
Winner	6.	2015	China Open	(England) Gary Wilson	10–2
Winner	7.	2016	World Snooker Championship (2)	(China) Ding Junhui	18–14
Winner	8.	2016	Paul Hunter Classic	(England) Tom Ford	4–2
Runner-up	9.	2016	Shanghai Masters	(China) Ding Junhui	6–10
Winner	9.	2016	International Championship	(China) Ding Junhui	10–1
Winner	10.	2016	UK Championship (2)	(England) Ronnie O'Sullivan	10–7
Winner	11.	2017	China Open (2)	(Wales) Mark Williams	10–8
Winner	12.	2017	World Snooker Championship (3)	(Scotland) John Higgins	18–15
Winner	13.	2017	International Championship (2)	(Northern Ireland) Mark Allen	10–7
Winner	14.	2018	China Open (3)	(England) Barry Hawkins	11–3
Winner	15.	2018	China Championship	(Scotland) John Higgins	10–9
Winner	16.	2019	English Open	(England) David Gilbert	9–1
Winner	17.	2019	Scottish Open	(England) Jack Lisowski	9–6
Winner	18.	2020	European Masters	(England) Martin Gould	9–8
Winner	19.	2020	Scottish Open (2)	(England) Ronnie O'Sullivan	9–3
Runner-up	10.	2021	Snooker Shoot Out	(Wales) Ryan Day	0–1
Winner	20.	2021	World Snooker Championship (4)	(England) Shaun Murphy	18–15
Winner	21.	2022	English Open (2)	(Belgium) Luca Brecel	9–6
Winner	22.	2023	WST Classic	(China) Pang Junxu	6–2
Runner-up	11.	2023	World Snooker Championship (2)	(Belgium) Luca Brecel	15–18
Runner-up	12.	2023	British Open	(Wales) Mark Williams	7–10
Winner	23.	2024	British Open	(Scotland) John Higgins	10–5
Winner	24.	2025	Welsh Open (2)	(Scotland) Stephen Maguire	9–6
Runner-up	13.	2025	Tour Championship	(Scotland) John Higgins	8–10
Winner	25.	2025	UK Championship (3)	(England) Judd Trump	10–8
Winner	26.	2026	China Open (4)	(Thailand) Noppon Saengkham	10–6
Runner-up	14.	2026	British Open (2)	(Wales) Jak Jones	6–10

=== Minor-ranking finals: 10 (7 titles) ===
Minor-ranking finals
Outcome	No.	Year	Championship	Opponent in the final	Score
Winner	1.	2010	Players Tour Championship – Event 2	(England) Barry Pinches	4–3
Winner	2.	2011	Paul Hunter Classic	(England) Mark Davis	4–0
Winner	3.	2012	Paul Hunter Classic (2)	(Northern Ireland) Joe Swail	4–1
Runner-up	1.	2012	Antwerp Open	(Northern Ireland) Mark Allen	1–4
Winner	4.	2013	FFB Open	(Scotland) Graeme Dott	4–3
Runner-up	2.	2013	Yixing Open	(England) Joe Perry	1–4
Runner-up	3.	2013	Rotterdam Open	(Wales) Mark Williams	3–4
Winner	5.	2013	Antwerp Open	(England) Ronnie O'Sullivan	4–3
Winner	6.	2014	Riga Open	(Northern Ireland) Mark Allen	4–3
Winner	7.	2016	Gdynia Open	(England) Martin Gould	4–1

=== Non-ranking finals: 22 (14 titles) ===
Legend
The Masters (3–2)
Champion of Champions (1–0)
Premier League (0–1)
Other (10–5)

Non-ranking finals
Outcome	No.	Year	Championship	Opponent in the final	Score	Ref
Runner-up	1.	2006	Masters Qualifying Event	(England) Stuart Bingham	2–6	
Winner	1.	2007	Warsaw Snooker Tour	(Scotland) John Higgins	5–3	
Winner	2.	2008	The Masters	(England) Stephen Lee	10–3	
Runner-up	2.	2008	Championship League	(England) Joe Perry	1–3	
Runner-up	3.	2008	Jiangsu Classic	(China) Ding Junhui	5–6	
Runner-up	4.	2008	World Series of Snooker Jersey	(Scotland) John Higgins	3–6	
Runner-up	5.	2008	Premier League	(England) Ronnie O'Sullivan	2–7	
Runner-up	6.	2009	The Masters	(England) Ronnie O'Sullivan	8–10	
Runner-up	7.	2009	Championship League (2)	(England) Judd Trump	2–3	
Winner	3.	2010	The Masters (2)	(England) Ronnie O'Sullivan	10–9	
Winner	4.	2010	Six-red World Championship	(England) Ricky Walden	8–6	
Winner	5.	2011	Wuxi Classic	(England) Ali Carter	9–7	
Winner	6.	2012	HK Spring Trophy	(England) Andrew Higginson	6–1	
Winner	7.	2013	The Masters (3)	(Australia) Neil Robertson	10–6	
Runner-up	8.	2014	The Masters (2)	(England) Ronnie O'Sullivan	4–10	
Winner	8.	2017	Haining Open	(England) Tom Ford	5–1	
Winner	9.	2018	Haining Open (2)	(China) Li Hang	5–4	
Winner	10.	2023	Macau Masters – Event 1	(England) Ali Carter	6–3	
Winner	11.	2024	Championship League Invitational	(England) Joe O'Connor	3–1	
Winner	12.	2025	Championship League Invitational (2)	(England) Kyren Wilson	3–0	
Winner	13.	2025	Champion of Champions	(England) Judd Trump	10–5	
Winner	14.	2026	Championship League Invitational (3)	(China) Wu Yize	3–1	

=== Pro-am finals: 1 ===
Outcome	No.	Year	Championship	Opponent in the final	Score	Ref
Runner-up	1.	2008	Paul Hunter Classic	(England) Shaun Murphy	0–4	

=== Team finals: 2 ===
Outcome	No.	Year	Championship	Team/partner	Opponent in the final	Score
Runner-up	1.	2022	World Mixed Doubles	(England) Rebecca Kenna	(Australia) Neil Robertson (Thailand) Nutcharut Wongharuthai	2–4
Runner-up	2.	2024	World Mixed Doubles (2)	(England) Rebecca Kenna	(Belgium) Luca Brecel (England) Reanne Evans	2–4

=== Amateur finals: 2 (1 title) ===
Outcome	No.	Year	Championship	Opponent in the final	Score	Ref
Winner	1.	1998	English Under-15 Championship	(England) Kurt Maflin	4–3	
Runner-up	1.	1998	Pontins Star of the Future	(England) Ricky Walden	2–3	

== Pool career ==
As well as being a professional snooker player, Selby is also adept at playing pool, specifically blackball (also known as English eight-ball) and Chinese eight-ball. In June 2006, he won the WEPF World Eightball Championship at the Norbreck Castle Hotel in Blackpool, beating Chris Melling 10–5 in the semi-finals and Darren Appleton 11–7 in the final.

In February 2015, Selby was runner-up at the inaugural Chinese Eight-ball World Championship in Yushan, China. Having defeated Liu Haitao 15–13 in the semi-finals, he lost 19–21 to Appleton in the final. Selby had edged into the lead, 19–18, before Appleton won three consecutive racks to cross the finishing line.

Selby entered the Ultimate Pool Pairs Cup in 2022, teaming up with his brother-in-law Gareth Potts. Dubbed "The Dream Team", Selby and Potts won the tournament after defeating the defending champions Karl Sutton and Shaun Chipperfield in the final, played on 19 December 2022. Having claimed snooker's English Open title the previous evening, Selby had won two live televised tournaments in two days in two different cue sports.

=== Pool finals: 2 (1 title) ===
Outcome	No.	Year	Championship	Opponent in the final	Score
Winner	1.	2006	WEPF World Eightball Championship	(England) Darren Appleton	11–7
Runner-up	1.	2015	Chinese Eight-ball World Championship	(England) Darren Appleton	19–21
