= 2022 World Mixed Doubles (snooker) =

Snooker event

2022 BetVictor World Mixed Doubles

Tournament information
- Dates: 24–25 September 2022
- Venue: Marshall Arena
- City: Milton Keynes
- Country: England
- Organisation: World Snooker Tour
- Format: Non-ranking team event
- Total prize fund: £140,000
- Winner's share: £60,000
- Highest break: Mark Selby (ENG) (134)

Final
- Champion: Neil Robertson (AUS); Mink Nutcharut (THA)
- Runner-up: Mark Selby (ENG); Rebecca Kenna (ENG)
- Score: 4–2

The 2022 World Mixed Doubles (officially the 2022 BetVictor World Mixed Doubles) was a non-ranking professional snooker team tournament that took place from 24 to 25 September 2022 at the Marshall Arena in Milton Keynes. Organised by the World Snooker Tour and sponsored by bookmaker BetVictor, the event was televised by ITV. It was the first staging of the tournament since 1991, when Steve Davis and Allison Fisher defeated Stephen Hendry and Stacey Hillyard 5–4 in the final in Hamburg. It featured a total prize fund of £140,000, of which the winners received £60,000 (£30,000 per player).

The event featured the top four men from the snooker world rankings and the top four women from the World Women's Snooker rankings. The teams were selected via a draw that took place on 6 August 2022. Ronnie O'Sullivan was paired with Reanne Evans, Judd Trump with Ng On-yee, Mark Selby with Rebecca Kenna, and Neil Robertson with Mink Nutcharut. The tournament was played as a round-robin with four-frame matches, followed by a final between the top-two placed teams. The team members made alternate visits to the table rather than playing alternate shots.

Despite losing their first two round-robin matches, Robertson and Mink defeated Trump and Ng 4–0 in their last round-robin match to reach the final, where they defeated Selby and Kenna 4–2 to win the tournament. There were three century breaks made during the event. Selby made two of these, including the event's highest break of 134.

== Format ==
The 2022 World Mixed Doubles was the first edition of the World Mixed Doubles since 1991 as well as the first televised mixed-gendered team event since 1991. In 1991, the event was played in Hamburg, Germany, and was won by Steve Davis and Allison Fisher, who defeated Stephen Hendry and Stacey Hillyard 5–4 in the final. The 2022 edition was played with four teams made up of the top four ranked players from the World Snooker Tour and the World Women's Snooker Tour. The event took place on 24 and 25 September 2022 at the Marshall Arena in Milton Keynes. Sponsored by bookmaker BetVictor, the event was televised by ITV in the UK and by Eurosport and Discovery+ in Europe. The four teams competed in a round-robin tournament with matches played as the best-of-four frames. The two teams that won the most frames over the round-robin progressed to the final, contested over the best-of-seven frames. Instead of scotch doubles, the event was played using alternative visits.

The teams were selected via a draw that took place on 6 August 2022. The top four players from the main tour and women's world rankings were set to compete. The 2022 World Snooker Championship winner Ronnie O'Sullivan was paired with 12-time Women's World Snooker Championship winner Reanne Evans, 2019 World Snooker Championship winner Judd Trump with Ng On-yee, 2021 World Snooker Championship winner Mark Selby with Rebecca Kenna, and 2010 World Snooker Championship winner Neil Robertson with reigning women's world champion Mink Nutcharut.

=== Prize Fund ===
A breakdown of the prize money awarded for the event is shown below:

- Winners: £60,000 – (£30,000 per player)
- Runners-up: £40,000 – (£20,000 per player)
- Third in group: £20,000 – (£10,000 per player)
- Fourth in group: £20,000 – (£10,000 per player)
- Total: £140,000

== Tournament Summary ==
All matches in the round-robin phase were a best-of-four, with the first two matches played on 24 September. Ng and Trump won their opening frame against O'Sullivan and Evans, before Trump made a break of 75 to take a 2–0 lead. They also won the third frame, with Ng making a clearance before Evans made a break of 62 in the final frame. Speaking after the 3–1 win, Ng commented that her clearance in frame three had "huge pressure but luckily I handled it well". In the opening frame of the next match, Selby made the highest break of the event, a 134 against Robertson and Mink. Robertson made 64 in the next frame, but Selby made further breaks of 40 and 64 to win 3–1.

O'Sullivan and Evans lost the opening frame by 11 points to Mink and Robertson, but completed a 3‍–‍1 victory which included an O'Sullivan 111 break in frame 2. Selby and Kenna also won 3‍–‍1 over Trump and Ng which included a 68 break from Selby. Going into the last round of matches Robertson and Mink were required to win all four frames to have a chance of qualifying for the final in their match against Trump and Ng. Robertson and Mink won all four frames, including a break of 74 by Mink in frame three. Selby and Kenna, who had already won two matches took the opening frame of their match against O'Sullivan and Evans qualifying them for the final. They also won two of the next three to win the match 3‍–‍1 with Selby making breaks of 67 and 78. Selby/Kenna finished the round-robin with nine frame wins, ahead of Robertson/Mink with six, both progressing to the final. O'Sullivan/Evans finished with five frame wins and Trump/Ng four.

The final was played over the best of seven frames on the evening of 25 September. Selby made a break of 108 in the opening frame, but Robertson and Mink won the next three frames to lead 3‍–‍1. Selby made breaks of 42 and 40 to take frame 5, but Robertson and Mink won frame 6 to defeat Selby and Kenna 4–2. Despite losing, Kenna suggested that the experience of the event was beneficial, hoping it "inspired some girls to give [snooker] a go." Robertson credited his playing partner with the event victory saying "It was her performance in the last match before the final and that filled me full of confidence because I knew even if I were to make a mistake, if she was given an opportunity she would do really well."

== Draw ==
=== Round Robin ===
The results from the round-robin are shown below. Teams in bold denote match winners.

Pos	Players	MW	MD	ML	HB	FW
1.	Mark Selby (ENG); Rebecca Kenna (ENG)	3	0	0	134	9
2.	Neil Robertson (AUS); Mink Nutcharut (THA)	1	0	2	74	6
3.	Ronnie O'Sullivan (ENG); Reanne Evans (ENG)	1	0	2	111	5
4.	Judd Trump (ENG); Ng On-yee (HKG)	1	0	2	75	4

O'Sullivan / Evans	1–**3**	**Trump / Ng**
**Selby / Kenna**	**3**–1	Robertson / Mink
**O'Sullivan / Evans**	**3**–1	Robertson / Mink
Trump / Ng	1–**3**	**Selby / Kenna**
O'Sullivan / Evans	1–**3**	**Selby / Kenna**
Trump / Ng	0–**4**	**Robertson / Mink**

=== Final ===
Final: Best of 7 frames. Referee: Desislava Bozhilova; Marshall Arena, Milton Keynes, England, 25 September 2022.
Mark Selby (ENG); Rebecca Kenna (ENG)	2–**4**	**Neil Robertson (AUS)**; **Mink Nutcharut (THA)**
**108**–8 (107), 0–**78** (69), 23–**61**, 25–**75** (67), **82**–0, 6–**105**
**107**	Highest break	69
**1**	Century breaks	0
1	50+ breaks	**2**

== Century breaks ==
There were three century breaks made during the event. The highest was a 134 made by Selby in the first frame of their group stage match against Robertson and Mink.

- 134, 107 – Mark Selby
- 111 – Ronnie O'Sullivan
