= 2023 World Snooker Championship =

Professional snooker tournament

2023 Cazoo World Snooker Championship

Tournament information
- Dates: 15 April – 1 May 2023
- Venue: Crucible Theatre
- City: Sheffield
- Country: England
- Organisation: World Snooker Tour
- Format: Ranking event
- Total prize fund: £2,395,000
- Winner's share: £500,000
- Highest break: Mark Selby (ENG) (147); Kyren Wilson (ENG) (147)

Final
- Champion: Luca Brecel (BEL)
- Runner-up: Mark Selby (ENG)
- Score: 18–15

The 2023 World Snooker Championship (officially the 2023 Cazoo World Snooker Championship) was a professional snooker tournament that took place from 15 April to 1 May 2023 at the Crucible Theatre in Sheffield, England, the 47th consecutive year that the World Snooker Championship was staged at the venue. The qualifying rounds took place from 3 to 12 April 2023 at the English Institute of Sport in Sheffield. The 15th and final ranking tournament of the 2022–23 snooker season, it was organised by the World Snooker Tour and sponsored for the first time by car retailer Cazoo. It was broadcast in the United Kingdom by the BBC, in Europe by Eurosport, and elsewhere in the world by Matchroom Sport and other broadcasters. The total prize fund was £2,395,000, of which the winner received £500,000.

Ronnie O'Sullivan was the defending champion, having defeated Judd Trump 18–13 in the 2022 final. He made a record 31st Crucible appearance, surpassing the 30 appearances by Steve Davis, and reached a record-extending 21st quarter-final—also becoming the first player to compete in 100 matches at the Crucible—but lost 10–13 to Belgian player Luca Brecel. Crucible debutants at the event were Fan Zhengyi, Jak Jones, Pang Junxu, Si Jiahui, and Wu Yize. Si, aged 20, became the first debutant to reach the semi-finals since Andy Hicks at the 1995 event and the youngest player to do so since O'Sullivan at the 1996 event. Brecel came from 5–14 behind in the semi-finals to defeat Si 17–15, the first time a player had won a match at the Crucible after trailing by nine frames. Brecel went on to defeat Mark Selby 18–15 in the final, winning his first world title, first Triple Crown title, and fourth ranking title. He became the sport's first world champion from mainland Europe.

The event's main stage produced 90 century breaks. For the second time, after the 2008 event, two maximum breaks occurred at the main stage of the tournament: Kyren Wilson made a maximum in his first-round match against Ryan Day, and Selby became the first player to make a maximum in a World Championship final. O'Sullivan made both his 1,200th century in professional competition and his 200th Crucible century at the event. The qualifying rounds produced another 135 centuries, including a 115 break by Ng On-yee, the highest by a female player in the tournament's history.

== Background ==
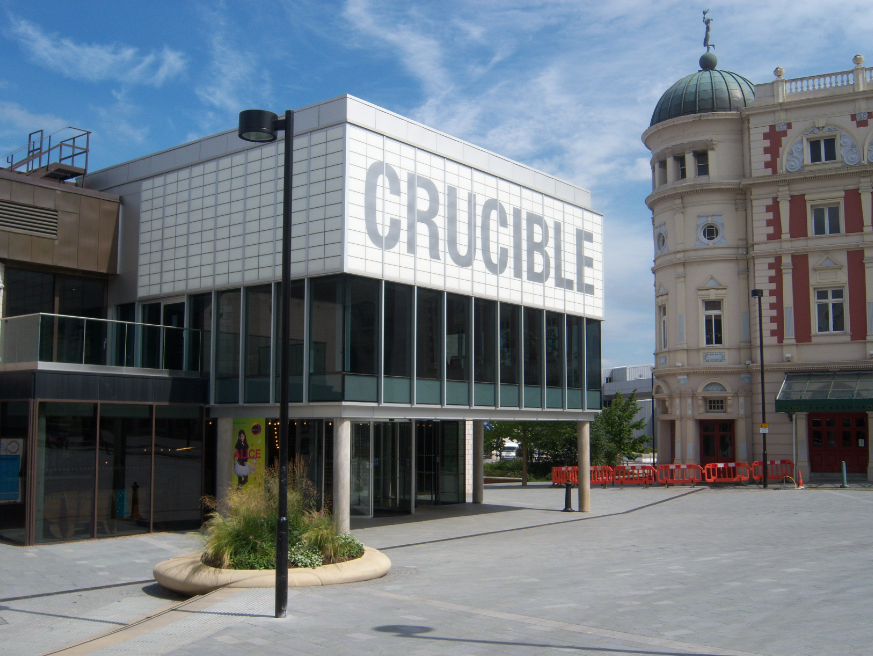
The main stage of the tournament was played at the Crucible Theatre in Sheffield, England.

The first World Snooker Championship final took place in 1927 at Camkin's Hall in Birmingham, England, and was won by Joe Davis. Staged annually until 1940, the tournament was put on hiatus during World War II and went into decline in the post-war era; the 1952 World Snooker Championship was contested by only two players and was replaced by the World Professional Match-play Championship, which was also discontinued in 1957. Revived on a challenge basis in 1964, the World Snooker Championship reverted to an annual knockout tournament in 1969. In 1977, the tournament was first staged at the Crucible Theatre in Sheffield, where it has remained since.

The 2023 event (officially known as the 2023 Cazoo World Snooker Championship) was organised by the World Snooker Tour and sponsored for the first time by British car retailer Cazoo. It marked the 47th consecutive year that the tournament was held at the Crucible and the 55th successive year that the World Championship was contested through the modern knockout format. It also marked the 40th anniversary of the first maximum break at the tournament, achieved by Cliff Thorburn at the 1983 event. Ronnie O'Sullivan was the defending champion, having defeated Judd Trump 18–13 in the 2022 final to win his seventh world title, equalling Stephen Hendry's modern-era record. O'Sullivan made a record 31st Crucible appearance at the 2023 event, surpassing the 30 appearances by Steve Davis.

Ten Chinese players, including 2021 UK Championship winner Zhao Xintong and 2021 Masters winner Yan Bingtao, were ineligible to compete in the 2023 event, having been suspended from professional competition and charged with match-fixing violations earlier in the season. Disciplinary hearings for the suspended players began on 24 April, midway through the tournament, resulting in lifetime bans for two players—Liang Wenbo and Li Hang—and lengthy bans for the others.

=== Format ===
The qualifying stage took place from 3 to 12 April 2023 at the English Institute of Sport in Sheffield, featuring 128 players, 16 of whom qualified for the main stage. World Championship qualifiers from 2020 to 2022 had comprised three rounds played as the best of 11 frames and a final round played as the best of 19 frames, with higher-ranked players seeded through to the second or third rounds. The 2023 event reverted to a best-of-19 format for all four rounds of qualifying, as had been the case before the COVID-19 pandemic, but seeded draws remained in place. Qualification rounds were broadcast by Discovery+ in Europe; Liaoning TV, Superstar online, Migu, Youku and Huya Live in China; and by Matchroom Sport in all other territories. The final qualifying round was also streamed on the World Snooker Tour's Facebook page and YouTube channel.

The first-round draw took place on BBC Radio 5 Live on 13 April, during which the 16 successful qualifiers were drawn at random against the top 16 players in the snooker world rankings. The draw was hosted by Rob Walker, with reactions from Shaun Murphy. The main stage took place from 15 April to 1 May at the Crucible Theatre. First-round matches were played from 15 to 20 April as the best of 19 frames. Second-round matches were played from 20 to 24 April as the best of 25 frames. Quarter-finals were played on 25 and 26 April as the best of 25 frames, and the semi-finals were played from 27 to 29 April as the best of 33 frames. The final was played over two days, 30 April and 1 May, as the best of 35 frames.

The main stage of the tournament was broadcast in the United Kingdom by the BBC, Eurosport, and Discovery+, and elsewhere in Europe by Eurosport and Discovery+. Other international broadcasts were provided by Superstar online, Migu, Huya Live, Youku, and CCTV in China; by NowTV in Hong Kong; by FastsportsHD in Pakistan; by Astro SuperSport in Malaysia and Brunei; by TrueVisions in Thailand; by Premier Sports in the Philippines; by StarHub in Singapore; by Sportcast in Taiwan and Indonesia; and by DAZN in the United States and Brazil. In territories where there was no other coverage, the event was broadcast by Matchroom Sport. The BBC coverage of the last session of the final attracted an average of 2.7 million viewers, with a peak of 3.6 million.

=== Prize fund ===
The winner of the event received £500,000 from a total prize fund of £2,395,000. The breakdown of prize money is shown below:

- Winner: £500,000
- Runner-up: £200,000
- Semi-finalists: £100,000
- Quarter-finalists: £50,000
- Last 16: £30,000
- Last 32: £20,000
- Last 48: £15,000
- Last 80: £10,000
- Last 112: £5,000
- Highest break (qualifying stage included): £15,000

A bonus of £40,000 was on offer for a maximum break made at the Crucible and £10,000 for a maximum made in the qualifying rounds. These bonuses were in addition to the £15,000 highest break prize and were shared in the case of multiple maximums. No player achieved a maximum in the qualifying rounds, but both Kyren Wilson and Mark Selby made maximums at the Crucible; they each received £27,500, representing half of the combined highest break and maximum break prizes.

== Summary ==
=== Qualification ===
==== First qualification round ====
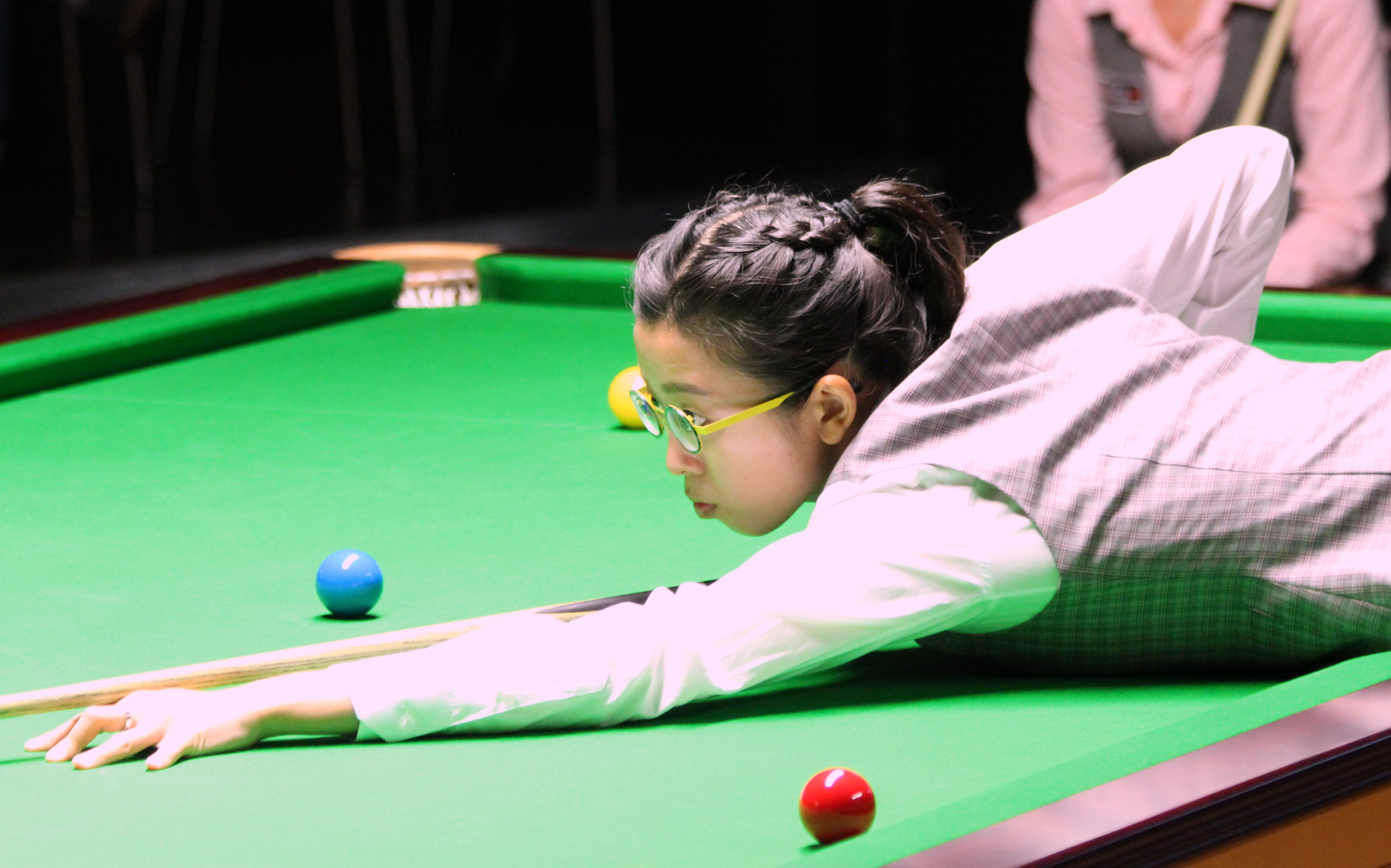
Hong Kong player Ng On-yee (pictured in 2017) made a 115 break, the highest by a female player in the history of the tournament.

The first qualifying round featured players ranked 81 to 112 against players seeded 113 to 144, including selected amateurs. The tournament featured five female players, the most in 31 years, although all five lost in the first qualifying round. Mink Nutcharut lost 7–10 to Dechawat Poomjaeng, but made her first century break in professional competition, becoming the first woman since Kelly Fisher in 2002 to make a century in a World Championship match. The following day, Ng On-yee made a 115 break, the highest by a woman in the event's history. However, Ng lost 8–10 to Michael Holt, while Reanne Evans lost 5–10 to Ken Doherty. The reigning women's world champion Baipat Siripaporn lost 3–10 to Aaron Hill, and Rebecca Kenna lost by the same score to Alfie Burden.

The seven-time champion Hendry lost 4–10 to James Cahill, his ex-wife's nephew, but stated that he still had "a very distant dream" of one day reaching the Crucible again. Stan Moody, aged 16, had recently earned the right to play on the professional tour as he won a two-year tour card to begin in the 2023–24 season by winning the WSF Junior Snooker Championship. He defeated Andres Petrov 10–7 to win his first World Championship match. The 2022 Hong Kong Masters finalist Marco Fu lost 5–10 to Martin O'Donnell. Ukrainian player Iulian Boiko defeated Muhammad Asif 10–2. Austrian player Florian Nüßle defeated Michael Judge by the same score. Evans, Fu, Judge, Ng, and Dean Young all lost their professional tour cards after their first-round defeats. However, Evans secured a new two-year tour card by ending the season at number one in the World Women's Snooker rankings, following her performance at the 2023 British Women's Open. Fu was awarded a two-year invitational tour card. Young later secured a new two-year tour card through 2023 Q School.

==== Second qualification round ====
The second qualifying round featured the first-round winners against players ranked 49 to 80. Sean O'Sullivan was on course for a maximum break when he potted two red balls in one shot, leaving him unable to complete the maximum; he finished on a break of 140. Matthew Stevens defeated Poomjaeng 10–8, despite having required two snookers in the final frame. Poomjaeng posed for a selfie with Stevens after the first session while trailing 3–6. Jimmy White, who had last reached the Crucible in 2006, had predicted that he was "playing too well" not to reach the main stage in 2023. However, he lost 4–10 to O'Donnell, a defeat he blamed on tweaking his technique late in the season, calling it a "huge mistake" and a "schoolboy error". Si Jiahui led Nüßle 9–1, but Nüßle narrowed his deficit to two frames before Si won the match 10–7. Hill defeated Michael White 10–3 and Zhang Anda beat Moody by the same score.

Welsh player Jackson Page defeated Scotland's Ross Muir 10–2. Doherty made a 137 break as he defeated Hammad Miah 10–6 but broached the possibility of retirement at the end of the 2023–24 season if his overall form did not improve. Ben Mertens defeated fellow Belgian player Julien Leclercq, also by a 10–6 scoreline, while Scott Donaldson defeated 16-year-old Liam Davies 10–1. Stuart Carrington, Gerard Greene, Louis Heathcote, Duane Jones, Mitchell Mann, Miah, Jamie O'Neill, Fraser Patrick, Craig Steadman, and Alexander Ursenbacher all lost their tour cards after their second-round defeats. However, Miah qualified through the one-year ranking list for a new two-year tour card. Carrington, Heathcote, and Ursenbacher later secured new two-year tour cards through 2023 Q School.

==== Third qualification round ====
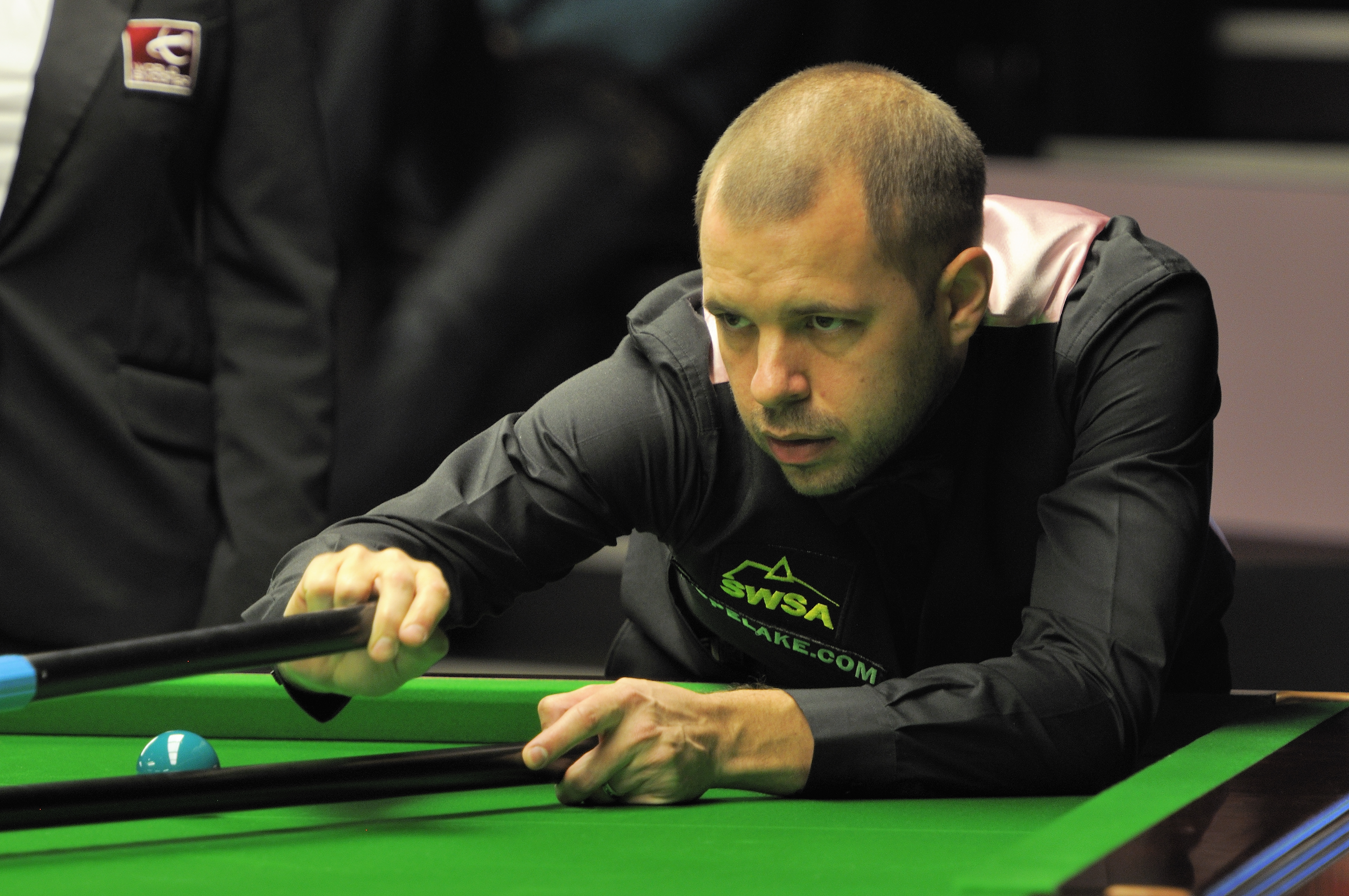
Former runner-up Barry Hawkins (pictured in 2014) played in the qualifiers for the first time since 2012 and failed to reach the Crucible stage for the first time since 2005.

The third qualifying round featured the second-round winners against players ranked 17 to 48. The 2006 champion Graeme Dott reached the final round with a 10–6 victory over Andy Hicks. John Astley was defeated by Anthony McGill in a deciding frame. Thepchaiya Un-Nooh made four centuries, including a 145, as he defeated Mark Joyce 10–5. Ricky Walden beat Ian Burns 10–6. The 2013 runner-up Barry Hawkins played in the qualifying rounds for the first time since 2012 after falling to number 20 in the world rankings. He defeated David Lilley 10–4, despite failing to make a break over 50 in the contest. Stephen Maguire, who had reached the last 16 of only one tournament during the season, defeated Burden 10–4. Fan Zhengyi defeated Boiko 10–8, while the 2023 Snooker Shoot Out winner Chris Wakelin beat Hill 10–2 and Jordan Brown defeated Dominic Dale 10–7. Si advanced to the fourth round with a 10–5 victory over Tom Ford.

Joe Perry trailed Sanderson Lam 4–5 after the first session but recovered to win 10–8, his first victory in the qualifiers in four years. World number 23 Hossein Vafaei, who made his Crucible debut the previous year, defeated Andrew Pagett 10–4. Page defeated Martin Gould 10–6. David Gilbert advanced with a 10–3 win over Barry Pinches, and Stevens defeated Jamie Clarke by the same score. Cahill and Zhou Yuelong played just six frames in their opening session, which ended level at 3–3. Cahill scored only 15 points over the next six frames as Zhou took a 9–3 lead; Zhou went on to win the match 10–4. The 2022 British Open winner Ryan Day took an 8–4 lead over Ashley Hugill. Hugill narrowed Day's lead to 8–7, but Day secured a 10–8 victory in a 30-minute final frame. After the match, Day expressed frustration with his recent form and said he was considering retirement. Pang Junxu, lost the first four frames against Doherty, but won the match 10–6. Anthony Hamilton defeated Oliver Lines in a deciding frame, and Elliot Slessor also won a deciding frame against Liam Highfield. Burden, Burns, Peter Lines, Pagett, and Pinches all lost their tour cards after their third-round defeats. However, Burns qualified for a new two-year tour card through the one-year ranking list, while Burden and Pagett later secured new two-year tour cards through 2023 Q School.

==== Fourth qualification round ====
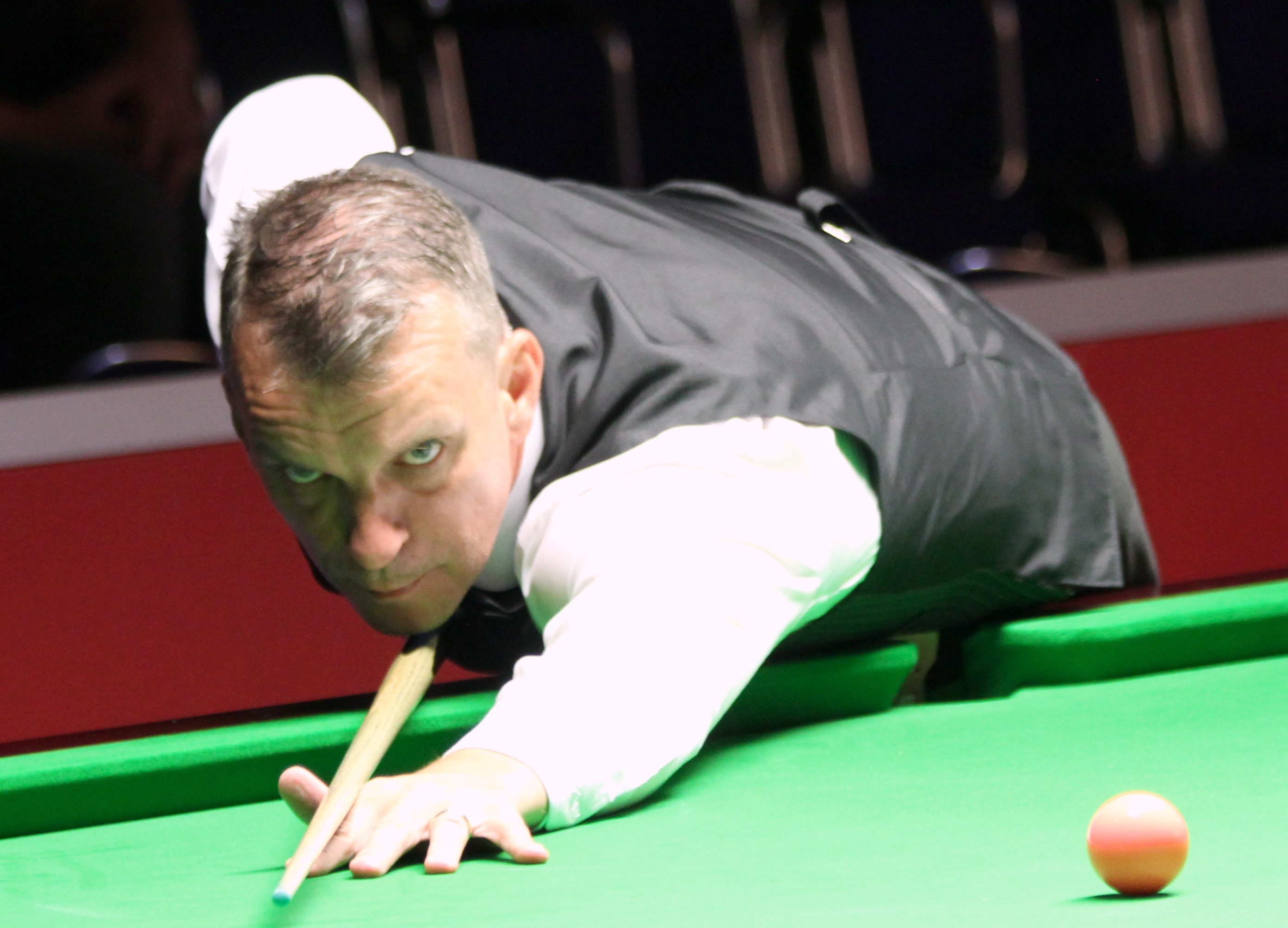
After losing in qualifying, Mark Davis (pictured in 2016) retained his tour card only after eligibility criteria were changed for the 2023–24 season.

The fourth and final qualifying round, billed as "Judgement Day", featured the 32 third-round winners facing each other, with the 16 victors advancing to the main draw at the Crucible. The 2020 semi-finalist McGill lost the first three frames against Cao Yupeng but won the match 10–6 to reach the Crucible for a ninth consecutive time. Walden led Un-Nooh 4–1, but Un-Nooh recovered to lead 5–4 after the first session. The match, which featured four centuries and 10 other half-centuries, went to a deciding frame, which Walden won with a 69 break, helped by a fluke on the penultimate red. Dott lost 6–10 to Matthew Selt, the fourth consecutive year Dott had exited in the final qualifying round. Fan lost the first four frames against Maguire but recovered to secure his Crucible debut with a 10–6 victory; Maguire's loss meant that he failed to reach the Crucible for the first time since 2003. Si and Wu Yize both reached the Crucible for the first time after Si defeated Brown 10–7 and Wu recovered from 1–5 behind to defeat Wakelin 10–8. Welsh player Jak Jones secured his Crucible debut with a 10–8 victory over Hawkins, who failed to reach the main stage for the first time since 2005. Noppon Saengkham's match against Zhang came down to a duel on the final black ball. A lax safety shot from Zhang allowed Saengkham to pot the black in a baulk corner pocket, winning 10–9.

Donaldson lost the first four frames against Day and then withdrew, citing health reasons. Day, whose 146 break in the opening frame was the highest of the qualifying rounds, won the match 10–0 by default. Gilbert defeated Stevens 10–7, making three centuries in the match, while Jimmy Robertson defeated Hamilton 10–2 to reach the Crucible for the first time since 2018. David Grace, who had earlier avoided relegation from the tour by winning his second-round qualifying match, beat Andrew Higginson 10–5 to secure his second Crucible appearance. Vafaei defeated Page 10–6 to reach the Crucible for a second consecutive year. Slessor defeated Zhou 10–5, also reaching the Crucible for a second time, while Pang won five of the last six frames to defeat Xu Si by the same score and become the fifth Crucible debutant. Perry recovered from 8–9 behind to defeat his friend Mark Davis on the final black in the deciding frame, after Davis had missed a pot on the pink to win the match. Davis's qualifying loss left him outside the top 64 in the world rankings at the end of the season, implying that he would lose his tour card after 32 years as a professional. Perry, who won three frames in the match on the final black ball, reached the Crucible for the first time since 2019. He stated that he felt "physically sick" afterwards because of Davis's presumed relegation. However, after the tournament concluded, the World Snooker Tour announced that the top 68 players on the two-year ranking list would remain on tour for the 2023–24 season, rather than the usual 64, due to some players' suspensions. This change meant that Davis, ranked 68th at the end of the season, remained on the tour.

=== Main stage ===
==== First round ====
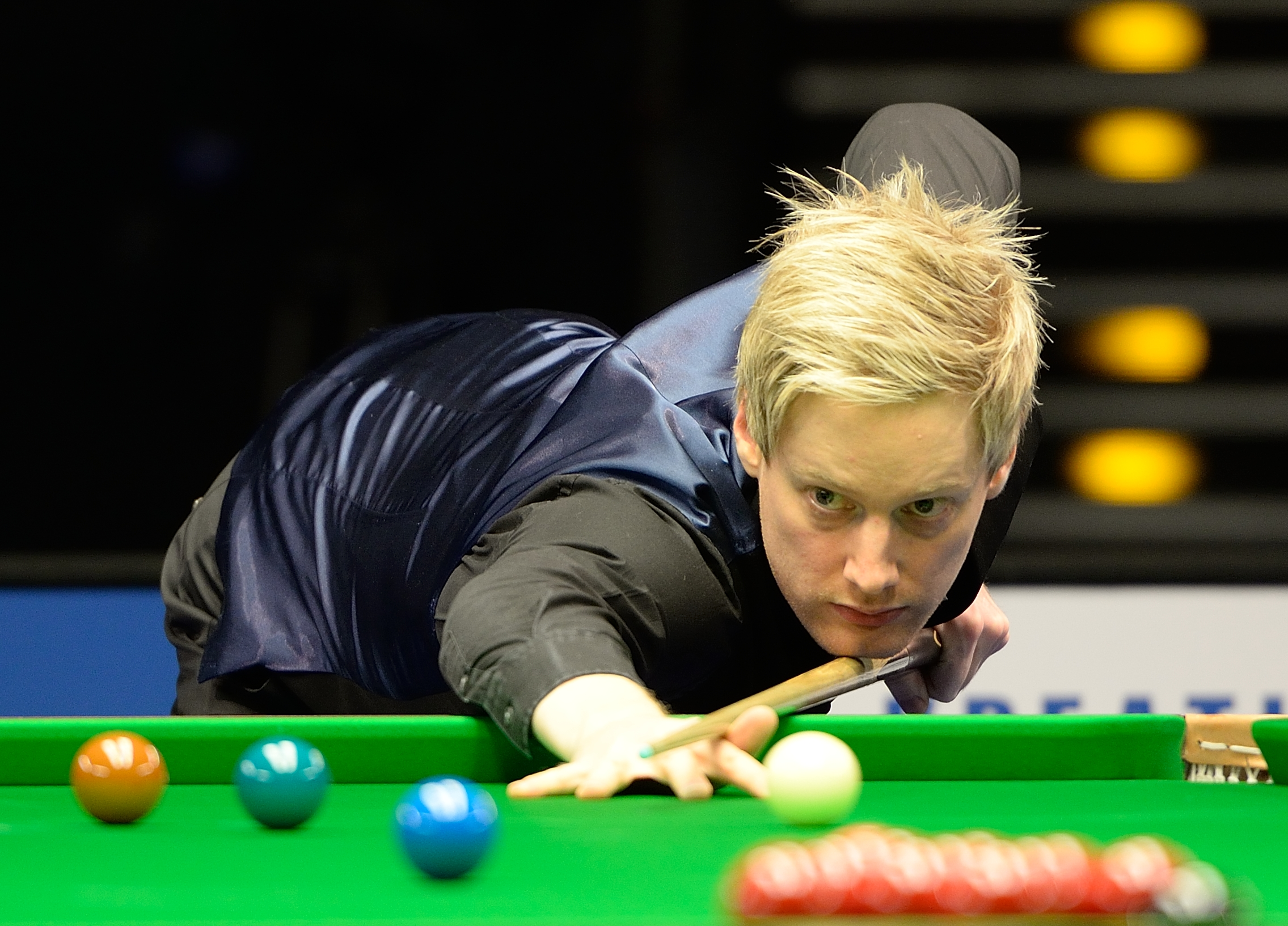
The 2010 champion Neil Robertson (pictured in 2015) became the first player to make two breaks of 146 in a professional match.

The first round was played as best-of-19-frame matches, held over two sessions, from 15 to 20 April. Ronnie O'Sullivan began his title defence by winning the first five frames against 23-year-old debutant Pang. However, Pang reduced O'Sullivan's lead to 6–3 after the first session, coming within two frames at 9–7 before O'Sullivan clinched a 10–7 victory. Stating afterwards that he had felt "shaky, heavy and desperate" during the match due to illness, O'Sullivan praised his opponent, calling Pang a "phenomenal player, a joy to watch." The 2015 champion Stuart Bingham, who had reached only one ranking quarter-final that season, arrived at the Crucible needing to reach at least the semi-finals to retain his top-16 ranking. He trailed Gilbert 1–3 but won nine of the next ten to clinch a 10–4 victory, extending his head-to-head record against Gilbert to 12–0. Facing 19-year-old debutant Wu, the 2010 champion Neil Robertson made four centuries on his way to a 10–3 victory, including 146 breaks in both the 11th and 13th frames. This marked the first time Robertson had made a 146 break in professional competition and the first time any player had made two 146 breaks in a professional match. Luca Brecel made his sixth Crucible appearance after five previous first-round losses. He led Walden 6–3 after the first session, and preserved his lead at 9–6 in the second session. Walden tied the scores at 9–9 to force a decider, but Brecel, who had lost deciding frames to Fu in 2017 and Gary Wilson in 2019, made an 84 break to secure his first Crucible victory. Saying that, at 9–9, he was having flashbacks to his loss against Fu, Brecel commented: "I needed this win, because if I didn't win today maybe I would never have won a game here."

The 2023 German Masters champion Ali Carter faced Welsh debutant Jones. Carter made a 143 total clearance in frame five, but Jones won the first session 5–4 and went on to clinch the match 10–6. The first seeded player eliminated from the event, Carter called the loss "a disappointing end to a good season". Ding Junhui led Vafaei 5–4 after the opening session, but Vafaei made back-to-back centuries of 117 and 122 and three further half-centuries in the second session as he won his first match at the Crucible 10–6. Afterwards, Vafaei made disparaging remarks about his second-round opponent O'Sullivan that stoked a widely publicised feud between the players. Making his 25th Crucible appearance, three-time champion Mark Williams faced Jimmy Robertson, who had lost in the first round on each of his four previous Crucible appearances. Robertson led 5–4 after the first session, but Williams won all six frames played in the second session for a 10–5 victory. Four-time champion John Higgins made his 29th Crucible appearance, 25 years after winning his first world title in 1998. He led Grace 7–2 after the first session and wrapped up a 10–3 win in the second session with breaks of 114, 97, and 124. Noting that he had recently changed his technique, he commented: "I feel as if I'm playing better stuff than ever."

Mark Allen, who had won ranking titles during the season at the 2022 Northern Ireland Open, the 2022 UK Championship, and the 2023 World Grand Prix, won the first five frames against debutant Fan. Although Fan won the next three with breaks including 122 and 110, Allen took the last of the session to lead 6–3. Fan and Allen resumed on table two on the evening of 17 April, as Perry and Robert Milkins began their match on table one. The sessions were disrupted by Just Stop Oil protesters, one of whom climbed on table one and spread orange powder on the cloth. Referee Olivier Marteel restrained another protester who attempted to glue herself to table two. South Yorkshire Police arrested both protesters. Tournament officials halted play on table two for 45 minutes while event staff cleaned the area and rescheduled Perry and Milkins's first session to the following evening after table one was deemed unplayable. Despite the interruption, Allen completed a 126 break that he had started before play was suspended. He went on to defeat Fan 10–5. The cloth on table one was replaced in time for the first session between Jack Lisowski and Saengkham the following morning, which also saw tighter security measures at the venue. Lisowski took a 6–3 lead in a fast-paced session where only two frames lasted longer than 15 minutes. He moved 9–4 ahead in the second session. However, Saengkham won three consecutive frames, making a 130 clearance in frame 16, narrowing Lisowski's lead to two frames. Lisowski later said he was "panicking a bit" before he secured a 10–7 victory. Former semi-finalist Gary Wilson, who had won his first ranking title earlier that season at the 2022 Scottish Open, made a highest break of 131 as he took a 7–2 lead over Slessor. However, Slessor reduced Wilson's lead to 8–5 and then 9–8 in the second session, before Wilson clinched a 10–8 victory with a century break. Wilson said afterwards that Slessor's comeback had made the scoreline "too close for comfort."

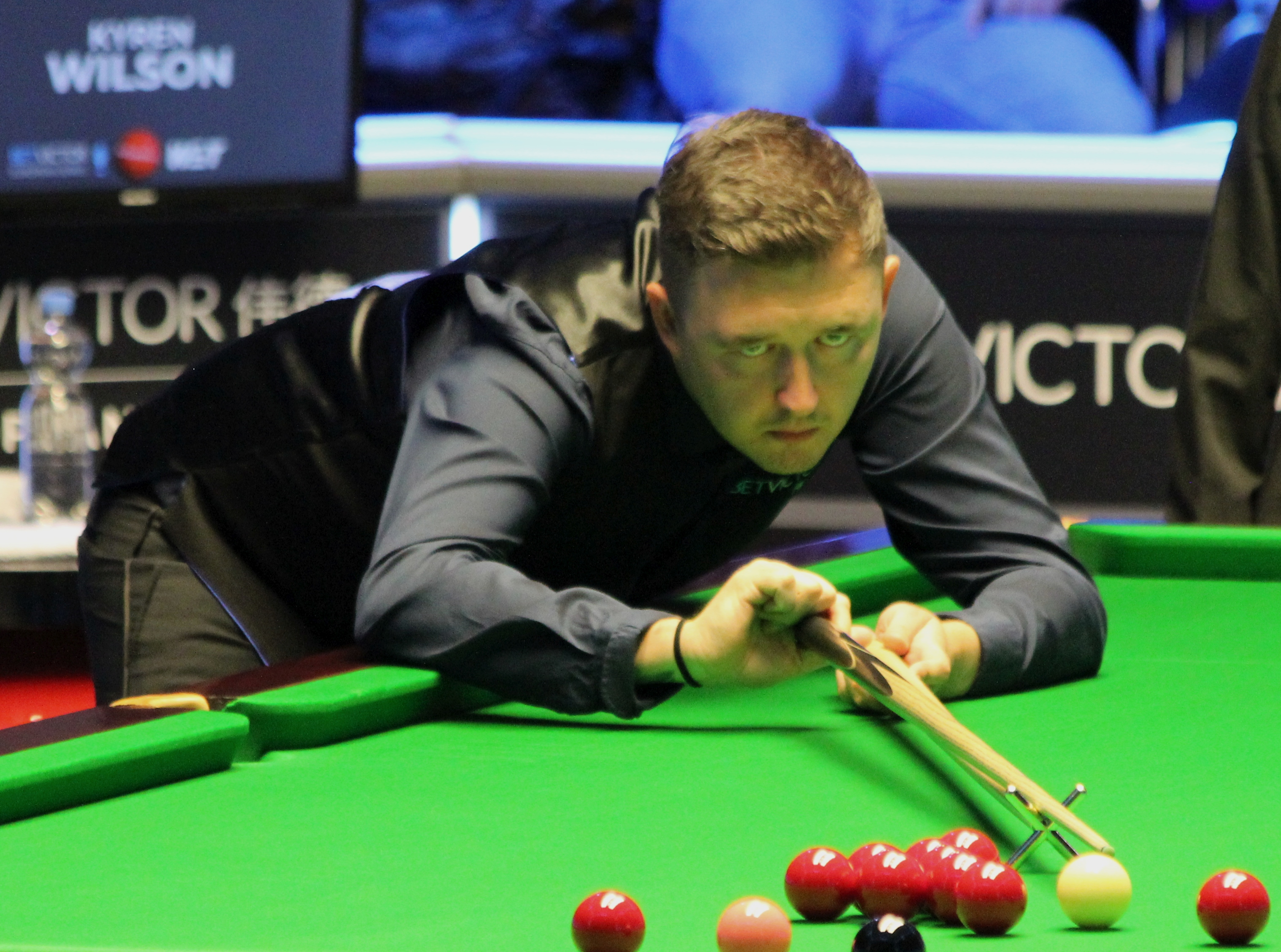
The 2020 runner-up Kyren Wilson (pictured in 2022) became the ninth player to make a maximum break at the Crucible.

The 2019 champion and 2023 Masters winner Trump won the first two frames against McGill, but his opponent won six of the next seven to end the first session 6–3 in front. When play resumed, Trump narrowed his deficit to one at 7–6, but McGill won the last three frames for a 10–6 victory. After losing in the first round for the first time since 2017, Trump expressed frustration with his performance, saying he had "felt very rusty" and "missed too many easy balls", commenting: "You can't expect to play like that and win the World Championship." Perry won the first five frames of his rescheduled tie with Milkins and finished the session 7–2 ahead. However, when the match resumed, Milkins won seven of the first eight frames played to lead 9–8. Perry forced a decider, but Milkins secured a 10–9 victory with a 63 break, completing the biggest first-round comeback since Fu had recovered from 1–7 down to defeat Brecel in 2017. Milkins said he had tried to play more positively and aggressively in the second session, while Perry called his own performance a "shambles". The 2020 runner-up Kyren Wilson made a maximum break in the fifth frame of his match with Day, the fourth of his career and the 13th in Crucible history. He called the maximum "one of the greatest achievements of my short career." Wilson made additional centuries of 133, 120, 108, and 102 as he defeated Day 10–5, becoming only the third player, after O'Sullivan and Allen, to make five centuries in a first-round match at the Crucible.

Four-time champion and number two seed Mark Selby led Selt 6–3 overnight and extended his lead to 8–4. Selt won four of the next five frames, reducing Selby's lead to one at 9–8, before Selby won the match 10–8 with a 112 break. Selby said afterwards that his concentration during the match had been "non-existent" but commented: "I was glad my game managed to hold up under the pressure." Selt's loss meant that all four of his Crucible appearances had ended in first-round defeats. The 2005 champion Shaun Murphy, who had won the season's 2023 Players Championship and 2023 Tour Championship, faced debutant and world number 80 Si, the lowest-ranked player to reach the event's main stage. Si had previously defeated Murphy 6–5 in the first round of the 2021 UK Championship while competing as an amateur, provoking Murphy to complain that amateur players should not be permitted in professional tournaments. Although Murphy took a 3–1 lead, Si won four of the next five frames to end the first session 5–4 ahead. In the second session, Si opened with a 120 break and moved one frame from victory at 9–6, but Murphy won three consecutive frames to tie the scores at 9–9. In the deciding frame, Si made a 56 break and later snookered Murphy on the last red while leading by 23 points. Murphy failed three times to escape from the snooker, leaving Si a pot on the red after his last attempt. Si cleared to the black, closing out a 10–9 victory to reach the last 16 of a ranking event for only the fourth time. Afterwards, Murphy said Si had been "fabulous from start to finish", saying: "I threw everything at him, I tried my absolute best and I still lost." Murphy predicted that Si would become the sport's first Chinese world champion.

==== Second round ====
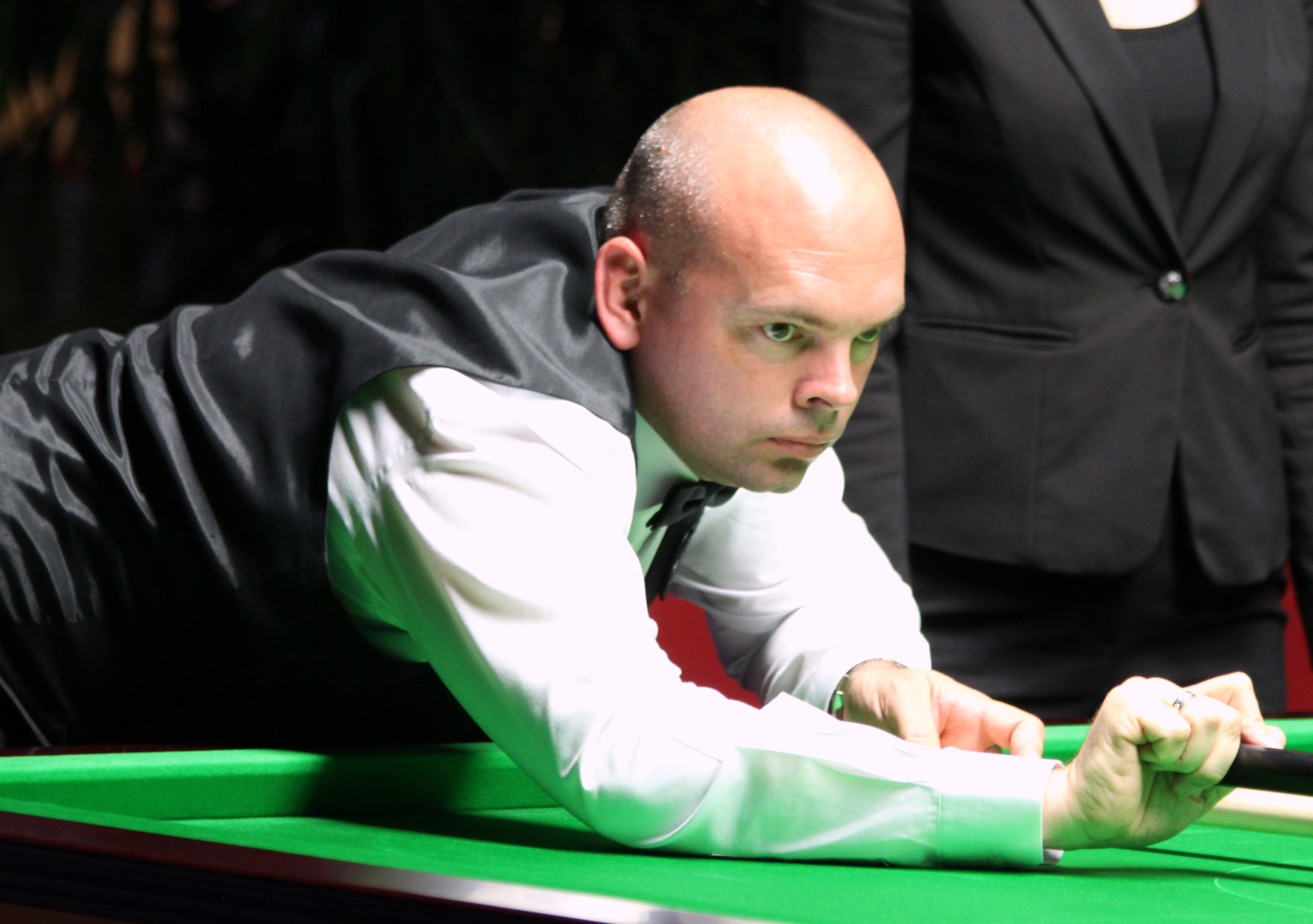
The 2015 champion Stuart Bingham (pictured in 2016) dropped out of the top 16 after his second-round defeat to Mark Allen.

The second round was played as best-of-25-frame matches, held over three sessions, from 20 to 24 April. Twelve of the sixteen seeds reached the second round, along with four qualifiers, Jones, McGill, Si, and Vafaei. Tied 4–4 with Williams after the first session, Brecel led 9–7 after the second session and extended his lead to 11–8 in the third session. Although Williams tied the scores at 11–11, Brecel won the last two frames with breaks of 84 and 67 to clinch a 13–11 victory, having made four centuries and eight more half-centuries in the match. Williams said afterwards that Brecel was "potting balls from everywhere and thoroughly deserved the win". Allen led Bingham 5–3 after the first session, and won seven consecutive frames in the second session to lead 12–3. Even though Bingham took the 16th frame with a century to avoid losing with a session to spare, the third session lasted just 16 minutes as Allen wrapped up a 13–4 victory, having made 13 half-centuries in the match. During play, Allen wore a colourful bracelet with the word "dad", given to him by his five-year-old daughter Harleigh, which he said helped keep his mind at rest. Bingham, who dropped out of the top 16 after his defeat, promised to "come back fighting next season". After his first session with Neil Robertson ended level at 4–4, Jones won six consecutive frames in the second session to move 10–6 ahead. He also won three of the four frames played in the final session, ending with a 138 total clearance, to clinch a 13–7 victory. Robertson praised his opponent, calling his safety play "incredible".

Vafaei made further critical comments about O'Sullivan before their second-round match, but the seven-time champion cautioned Vafaei that such remarks only motivated him to perform, saying: "Don't rattle my cage." The media widely described the encounter as a "grudge match". After O'Sullivan won the first frame with a 78 break, Vafaei smashed the pack of reds open on his break-off shot, in retaliation for O'Sullivan having done the same during their 2022 German Masters qualifying match, which Vafaei had found insulting. Speaking as a pundit for the BBC, Steve Davis called the shot "disrespectful to the game of snooker and the people who come along to watch", while Hendry in commentary called it "obviously premeditated" and "silly". O'Sullivan made another frame-winning 78 break from Vafaei's break-off and went on to take a 6–2 lead, making his 200th Crucible century during the session. He won all seven frames played in the second session, finishing with back-to-back centuries, including his 1,200th century break in professional competition in the penultimate frame. In defeating Vafaei 13–2 with a session to spare, O'Sullivan equalled his largest winning margin in a best-of-25-frame match, having beaten Milkins by the same scoreline at the 2002 event. Afterwards, the players embraced and appeared to reconcile. Vafaei said that he had "lost to the greatest ever", while O'Sullivan said: "There are no hard feelings from me. I love Hossein [Vafaei], he is a great guy and a brilliant player."

Higgins made centuries of 136, 137, and 134 and three half-centuries as he took an 8–0 lead over Kyren Wilson, the first time Higgins had recorded a session whitewash at the Crucible since playing Lisowski at the 2018 event. He went on to win the match 13–2 with a session to spare, calling the scoreline "an incredible result". Wilson, who had dropped his cue between sessions while signing autographs, dislodging a weight in the butt, said that the cue was not the reason for his defeat. He called Higgins's performance "awesome". Although McGill moved into a 10–1 lead over Lisowski, his opponent won seven of the next eight frames, narrowing his lead to 11–8, before McGill took the last two for a 13–8 victory. Commenting on Lisowski's comeback, McGill said: "We are in a theatre and snooker is drama. It's the best kind of drama. I love it." Selby, winner of the 2022 English Open and 2023 WST Classic during the season, faced Gary Wilson. After the first four frames were shared, Wilson won a 53-minute fifth frame after a prolonged tactical battle while the pink was lodged in the jaws of the green pocket behind the last two reds. Selby won three consecutive frames to finish the session 5–3 ahead, and moved 10–6 in front in the second session, before completing a 13–7 victory. Afterwards, he called it a "tough game" and "scrappy" but said he was "happy to get through". Si won four consecutive frames in each of the first two sessions as he took an 11–5 lead over 2023 Welsh Open winner Milkins. Si went on to win 13–7, reaching only the second ranking quarter-final of his career. Afterwards, he said he was "so surprised" to progress to the quarter-finals but was "honoured" to have reached that stage.

==== Quarter-finals ====
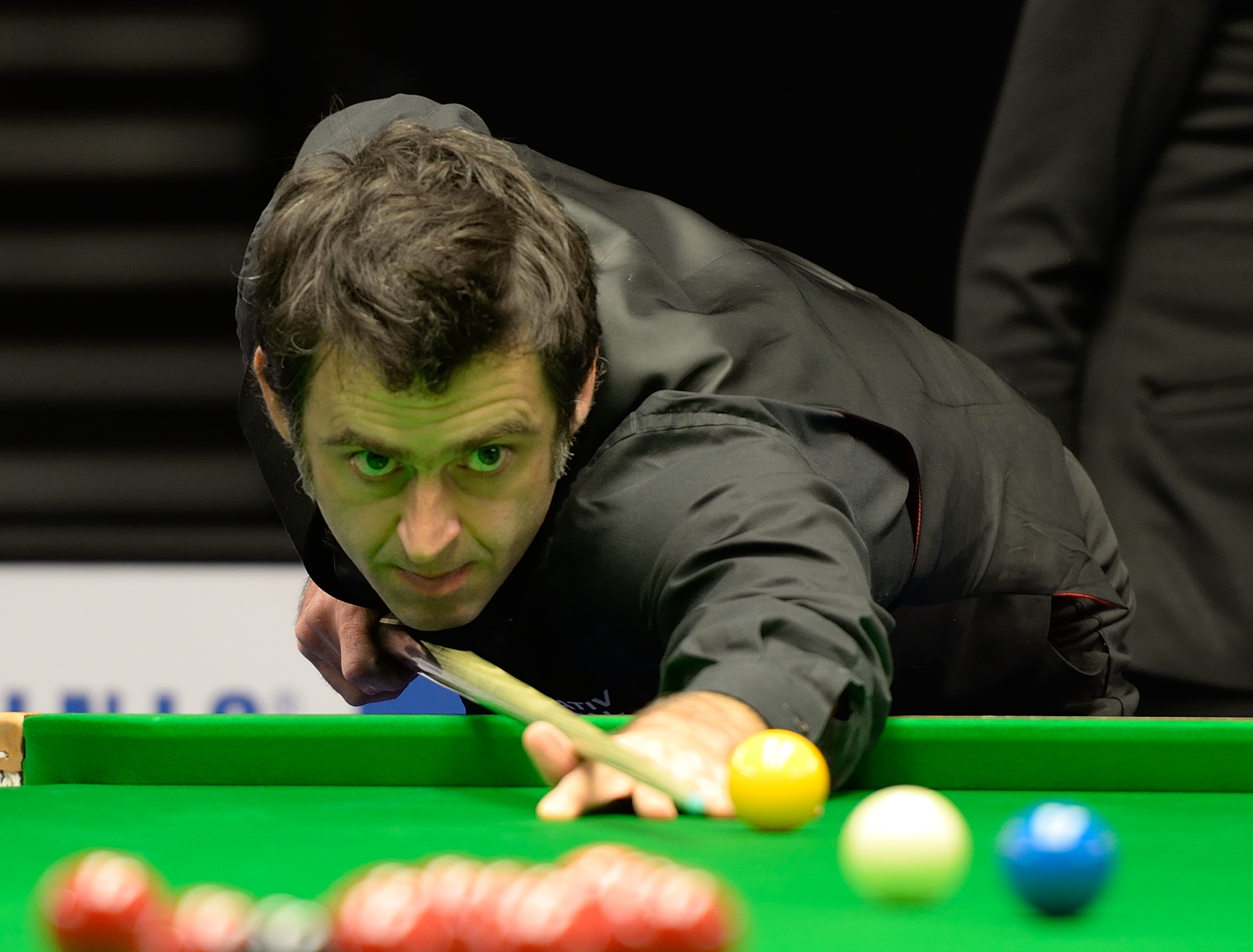
The defending champion Ronnie O'Sullivan (pictured in 2015) appeared at the Crucible for a record 31st time. His 10–13 quarter-final loss to Luca Brecel was his 100th match at the venue.

The quarter-finals were played as best-of-25-frame matches over three sessions, on 25 and 26 April. Five seeds, Allen, Brecel, Higgins, O'Sullivan, and Selby, and three qualifiers, Jones, McGill, and Si, reached the quarter-final stage. For the first time since Tony Drago and Steve James in 1988, two Crucible debutants—Jones and Si—reached the last eight of the tournament. O'Sullivan played in the quarter-finals for a record-extending 21st time, also becoming the first player to compete in 100 matches at the Crucible.

O'Sullivan faced Brecel, who took two of the first three frames before O'Sullivan won five in a row to end the first session 6–2 in front. In the second session, Brecel twice narrowed O'Sullivan's lead to two frames, at 6–4 and 8–6, but O'Sullivan won the last two frames of the session to maintain a four-frame advantage at 10–6. However, in a final session that lasted just 75 minutes, Brecel took all seven frames to win the match 13–10. O'Sullivan failed to win a frame in a Crucible session for the first time since losing 11–17 to Dott in the 2006 semi-finals. Afterwards, O'Sullivan called his opponent "phenomenal, brilliant, amazing" and said: "I've never seen a talent like that before. No one plays like that, it's impossible." Brecel remarked that it was "amazing to beat someone like Ronnie [O'Sullivan] from so far behind." Allen, playing in his first quarter-final since the 2018 event, made a 137 break against Jones in the third frame. He recovered from 1–3 behind to tie the scores at 4–4 after the first session. Allen moved 7–5 ahead in the second session, but Jones won three of the last four to draw level at 8–8. In the third session, Jones made a 124 break to tie the scores at 10–10, but Allen won the next two frames to lead 12–10. In the hour-long 23rd frame, Jones required two snookers. Even though Jones secured the foul points he needed, Allen won a safety battle on the brown and clinched a 13–10 victory, after which he promised to "give it everything" for the rest of the tournament. Jones said he had missed too many easy shots in the match but had learned a lot from his debut.

Higgins contested his 17th quarter-final at the event, while Selby played in his 10th. The players, who had faced each other in the 2007 and 2017 finals, both made 67 breaks in the opening frame, which was decided on a re-spotted black. Higgins potted the black after a lengthy safety battle and went on to lead 4–1, but Selby won three consecutive frames to finish the session level at 4–4. The players completed just six frames in the second session, of which Selby won five to lead 9–5. In the final session, Selby won three of the first four frames to move one from victory at 12–6. Higgins made a century break in frame 19, but Selby closed out a 13–7 victory. Higgins's defeat meant he had failed to reach the semi-finals of any of the season's ranking events for the first time since the 2011–12 season. He praised Selby's tactical play, calling him "an animal on the table" and "a master at the game of snooker", but stated that he needed to play to a higher standard the following season to retain his top-16 ranking. Si, aged 20, was the event's youngest quarter-finalist since Stevens in 1998. He faced McGill, who reached his third quarter-final in four years. Si won four of the first five frames, but McGill won the last three of the session to tie the scores at 4–4. McGill moved 8–6 ahead in the second session, but Si made breaks of 80 and 86 to tie the scores again at 8–8. In the final session, McGill took an 11–9 lead, but Si won three consecutive frames to move one from victory at 12–11. Although McGill tied the scores at 12–12 with a 130 total clearance, he missed a pot while playing left-handed in the deciding frame, and Si made a 41 break. Unable to obtain the snookers he required, McGill conceded the frame to give Si a 13–12 victory. Si commented afterwards that he "used to tremble because of nerves in deciding frames" but had become "mentally stronger". McGill said: "Overall I played badly throughout the match, my game just wasn't there."

==== Semi-finals ====
The semi-finals were played as best-of-33-frame matches over four sessions, between 27 and 29 April. Three seeds—Allen, Brecel, and Selby—and one qualifier, Si, reached the semi-final stage. Selby played in the World Championship semi-finals for the eighth time. Allen contested his second semi-final, 14 years after his previous semi-final appearance at the 2009 event. Brecel was the first player from mainland Europe to reach a World Championship semi-final. Si played in his first semi-final at any ranking tournament; his previous best performance at a ranking event had been reaching the quarter-finals of the 2022 European Masters. The first Crucible debutant to reach the semi-finals since Hicks in 1995, Si was also the youngest semi-finalist since O'Sullivan in 1996. He became the second World Championship semi-finalist from mainland China, after Ding.

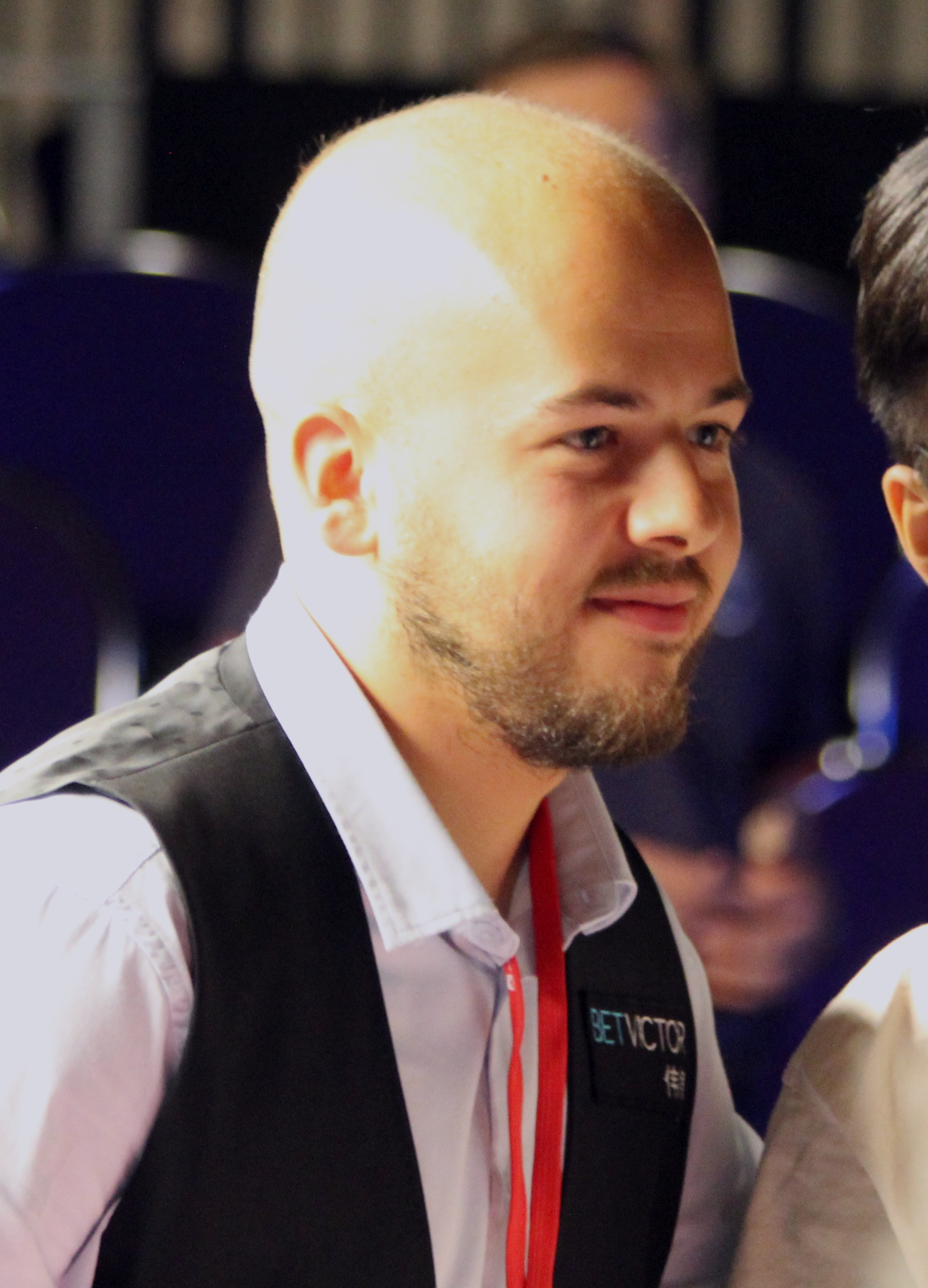
In the semi-finals, Luca Brecel (pictured in 2022) became the first player to win a match at the Crucible from a nine-frame deficit. He went on to win the championship—the sport's first world champion from mainland Europe.

Facing Brecel in the first semi-final, Si made consecutive breaks of 125, 102, and 97 and won the eighth frame on the black to lead 5–3 after the first session. He made a century and five half-centuries in the second session as he took an 11–5 lead. Brecel, who made just one half-century in the session, flipped the cue ball off the table with his cue while conceding the opening frame and was told to calm down by referee Rob Spencer. Si began the third session with consecutive breaks of 90, 132, and 97 as he took a nine-frame lead at 14–5. However, Brecel responded with breaks including 108, 60, and 66 as he took the next four frames. Brecel clinched the final frame of the session after Si missed the green, reducing Si's lead to 14–10 overnight. The crowd gave the players a standing ovation after the session, which Rob Calladine in The Guardian described as "one of the most exciting" ever seen at the Crucible. In the final session, Brecel won the first six frames, for a total of 11 consecutive frames in the match, to lead 16–14. Even though Si won the 31st frame with a 90 break, Brecel clinched a 17–15 victory, becoming the first player to win a match at the Crucible after trailing by nine frames. The previous record for a comeback win at the Crucible had been set in the 1985 final, when Dennis Taylor recovered from eight frames behind to defeat Steve Davis. Brecel, whose girlfriend Laura Vanoverberghe was issued an expedited passport so she could travel from Belgium for the final session, stated that he was "shaking so much" in the final frame, adding that "to win means so much in such a tough game and in such a big tournament". Si, who advanced from 80th to 36th in the world rankings after his performance in the tournament, said of the final session that "I really wanted to win and I felt really nervous and couldn't really get going."

Facing Allen in the other semi-final, Selby made a 123 break in the opening frame and moved 3–2 ahead. However, he scored just one point in the remainder of the session as Allen won three consecutive frames with half-century breaks to lead 5–3. Allen won the opening frame of the second session, but Selby won the next four to lead 7–6. Only five of the eight scheduled frames were played, as the session ran long, featuring three frames lasting longer than 40 minutes, and there were two re-racks. The eight frames in the third session were shared, leaving Selby one frame ahead at 11–10. In the final session, Selby took five consecutive frames to move one from victory at 16–10, but Allen also won five consecutive frames, reducing Selby's lead to 16–15. However, Selby made breaks of 64 and 28 in the 32nd frame to clinch a 17–15 victory. The match ended at 00:46 BST on 30 April 2023. Of the final frame, Selby said that Allen had the momentum after winning five frames in a row, but he "managed to hold [himself] together" to make a frame-winning break. Allen said he had "underperformed" in the match and was "disappointed" but commented that he "never gave up".

==== Final ====
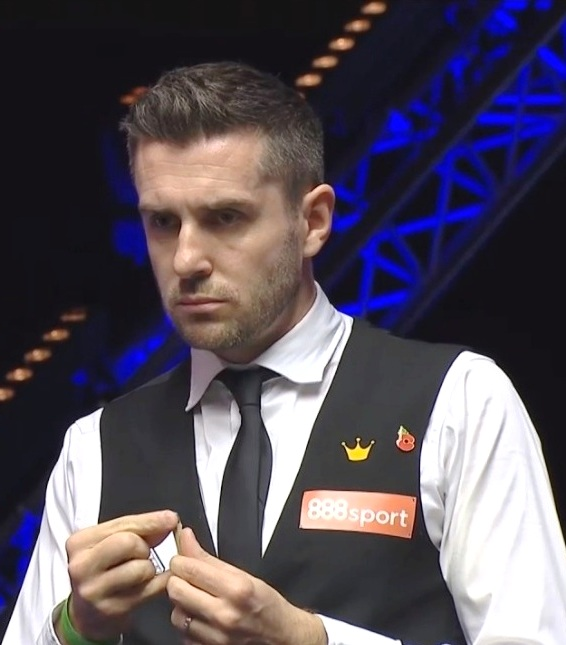
Runner-up Mark Selby (pictured in 2020) became the first player to compile a maximum break in a World Championship final.

The final was played as a best-of-35-frames match, held over four sessions on 30 April and 1 May, between Brecel and Selby. Brecel competed in his first World Championship final, while Selby contested his sixth, having won four and lost one previously. Brendan Moore, who had officiated the 2014 and 2018 finals, took charge of his third world final, his last match before retiring as a snooker referee. Brecel won five of the first six frames and finished the first session 6–2 ahead. Selby began the second session with a 134 break, the first century of the final, but Brecel responded with a 99 clearance in frame 10. Selby made a 96 break in frame 11 and also won frame 12, reducing Brecel's lead to 7–5 at the mid-session interval. Brecel won two of the next three frames to lead 9–6. In the 16th frame, Selby made a maximum break, the fifth of his career, the 14th in Crucible history and the first time a player had achieved a maximum in a World Championship final. It was the second time, after the 2008 event, that two maximums had occurred at the main stage of the tournament. Kyren Wilson and Selby were the ninth and tenth players respectively to make maximum breaks at the Crucible, following Thorburn, Jimmy White, Hendry, Ronnie O'Sullivan, Williams, Carter, John Higgins, and Neil Robertson. Selby later called the maximum an "amazing achievement" and "something I will remember for the rest of my life." Selby won the last frame of the session, reducing Brecel's lead to 9–8 overnight.

In the third session, Brecel won six of the eight frames played, four of them with century breaks of 113, 101, 141, and 119, to lead 15–10. Brecel began the final session with a 67 break, extending his lead to six frames, but Selby then won five consecutive frames, making a 122 century in frame 29 and recording a cumulative 315 points without reply as he reduced Brecel's lead to 16–15. After Selby missed a black in the 32nd frame, Brecel potted his first ball in 54 minutes and went on to make a 51 break. Selby had another chance to win the frame and tie the scores when he fluked a red, but Brecel moved 17–15 ahead after Selby missed the brown. A safety error from Selby in the 33rd frame allowed Brecel to make a 112 century, win the match 18–15, and secure his first world title and fourth ranking title. He became the first world champion from mainland Europe and the fourth world champion in the sport's modern era from outside the United Kingdom, following Canada's Cliff Thorburn in 1980, Ireland's Ken Doherty in 1997, and Australia's Neil Robertson in 2010. Afterwards, Brecel called Selby "such a fighter" and said he did not expect to win at 16–15 because he was "missing balls by a mile" after losing five frames in a row. He called his first world title "a dream come true" and "the best moment of my life". Selby said he "battled" in the final and "gave everything" but congratulated Brecel on his victory, calling him a "great talent". Ending the season at a career high of second in the world rankings, Brecel predicted that snooker would "explode" in mainland Europe after his success. Of Brecel's playing style, Steve Davis commented "it's great to see somebody play swashbuckling snooker, but with balance as well, and push the game to even more new limits than we thought possible."

== Main draw ==
The numbers in brackets after the players' names show their seedings.

First round Best of 19 frames
15 April
Ronnie O'Sullivan (ENG) (1)	10
Pang Junxu (CHN)	7
16 & 17 April
Ding Junhui (CHN) (16)	6
Hossein Vafaei (IRN)	10
15 & 16 April
Luca Brecel (BEL) (9)	10
Ricky Walden (ENG)	9
16 & 17 April
Mark Williams (WAL) (8)	10
Jimmy Robertson (ENG)	5
18 & 19 April
Judd Trump (ENG) (5)	6
Anthony McGill (SCO)	10
18 & 19 April
Jack Lisowski (ENG) (12)	10
Noppon Saengkham (THA)	7
18 & 20 April (Note: This match was initially scheduled to be played on 17th and 18th April. However, the match was rescheduled due to protestors vandalising the table, which necessitated that it was reclothed overnight.)
Robert Milkins (ENG) (13)	10
Joe Perry (ENG)	9
19 & 20 April
Shaun Murphy (ENG) (4)	9
Si Jiahui (CHN)	10
17 April
Mark Allen (NIR) (3)	10
Fan Zhengyi (CHN)	5
15 & 16 April
Stuart Bingham (ENG) (14)	10
David Gilbert (ENG)	4
15 & 16 April
Ali Carter (ENG) (11)	6
Jak Jones (WAL)	10
15 & 16 April
Neil Robertson (AUS) (6)	10
Wu Yize (CHN)	3
19 April
Kyren Wilson (ENG) (7)	10
Ryan Day (WAL)	5
17 & 18 April
John Higgins (SCO) (10)	10
David Grace (ENG)	3
18 April
Gary Wilson (ENG) (15)	10
Elliot Slessor (ENG)	8
19 & 20 April
Mark Selby (ENG) (2)	10
Matthew Selt (ENG)	8

Second round Best of 25 frames
21 & 22 April (Note: Originally also scheduled for 23 April, but ended with a session to spare.)
(England) Ronnie O'Sullivan (1)	13
(Iran) Hossein Vafaei	2
20 & 21 April
(Belgium) Luca Brecel (9)	13
(Wales) Mark Williams (8)	11
22, 23 & 24 April
(Scotland) Anthony McGill	13
(England) Jack Lisowski (12)	8
22, 23 & 24 April
(England) Robert Milkins (13)	7
(China) Si Jiahui	13
20, 21 & 22 April
(Northern Ireland) Mark Allen (3)	13
(England) Stuart Bingham (14)	4
21 & 22 April
(Wales) Jak Jones	13
(Australia) Neil Robertson (6)	7
23 April (Note: Originally also scheduled for 24 April, but ended with a session to spare.)
(England) Kyren Wilson (7)	2
(Scotland) John Higgins (10)	13
22, 23 & 24 April
(England) Gary Wilson (15)	7
(England) Mark Selby (2)	13

Quarter-finals; Best of 25 frames
25 & 26 April
(England) Ronnie O'Sullivan (1)	10
(Belgium) Luca Brecel (9)	13
25 & 26 April
(Scotland) Anthony McGill	12
(China) Si Jiahui	13
25 & 26 April
(Northern Ireland) Mark Allen (3)	13
(Wales) Jak Jones	10
25 & 26 April
(Scotland) John Higgins (10)	7
(England) Mark Selby (2)	13

Semi-finals; Best of 33 frames
27, 28 & 29 April
(Belgium) Luca Brecel (9)	17
(China) Si Jiahui	15
27, 28 & 29 April
(Northern Ireland) Mark Allen (3)	15
(England) Mark Selby (2)	17

Final; Best of 35 frames
30 April & 1 May
(Belgium) Luca Brecel (9)	18
(England) Mark Selby (2)	15

Final: (Best of 35 frames) Crucible Theatre, Sheffield, 30 April & 1 May 2023; Referee: Brendan Moore
Luca Brecel (9); Belgium				18–15			Mark Selby (2); England			
Session 1: 6–2
Frame	1	2	3	4	5	6	7	8	9	10
Brecel	77†(77)	79†	90†(90)	38	90†(67)	71†	9	70†(70)	N/A	N/A
Selby	0	39	28	94†(54)	23	55	66†(62)	6	N/A	N/A
Session 2: 3–6 (9–8)
Frame	1	2	3	4	5	6	7	8	9	10
Brecel	0	126†(99)	12	50	72†(72)	67†(67)	1	0	48	N/A
Selby	134†(134)	14	96†(96)	67†	4	19	76†(61)	147†(147)	71†	N/A
Session 3: 6–2 (15–10)
Frame	1	2	3	4	5	6	7	8	9	10
Brecel	113†(113)	73†	101†(101)	141†(141)	35	56	119†(119)	60†	N/A	N/A
Selby	24	0	35	0	86†(63)	78†(54)	0	40	N/A	N/A
Session 4: 3–5 (18–15)
Frame	1	2	3	4	5	6	7	8	9	10
Brecel	67†(67)	20	35	0	0	0	66†(51)	112†(112)	N/A	N/A
Selby	0	78†(78)	50†	122†(122)	81†(50)	95†(52)	2	0	N/A	N/A
141				Highest break			147			
5				Century breaks			3			
14				50+ breaks			12			
(Belgium) Luca Brecel wins the 2023 Cazoo World Snooker Championship † = Winner of frame

== Qualifying draw ==
The results from qualifying are shown below. Numbers given before players' names show World Championship seedings, and "a" indicates the amateur players at the time of the draw. The match winners are denoted in bold text. The World Professional Billiards and Snooker Association selected 16 amateur players to participate in the qualifying rounds together with the 103 professionals outside the top 16 of the world rankings and the top nine from the 2022 Q School Order of Merit.

**Round 1 (Last 144)**; Best of 19 frames
81	**Ashley Hugill** (ENG)	**10**
a	George Pragnell (ENG)	8
112	Fergal O'Brien (IRL)	8
a	**Liam Davies** (WAL)	**10**
96	**Zak Surety** (ENG)	**10**
a	Farakh Ajaib (PAK)	6
97	**Ken Doherty** (IRL)	**10**
Reanne Evans (ENG)	5
104	Ng On-yee (HKG)	8
a	**Michael Holt** (ENG)	**10**
89	**Ben Mertens** (BEL)	**10**
Victor Sarkis (BRA)	3
105	Ryan Thomerson (AUS)	8
a	**Ian Martin** (ENG)	**10**
88	**James Cahill** (ENG)	**10**
Stephen Hendry (SCO)	4
85	**Andrew Pagett** (WAL)	**10**
a	Gao Yang (CHN)	9
108	Oliver Brown (ENG)	5
a	**Ross Muir** (SCO)	**10**
92	Andy Lee (HKG)	3
a	**Andrew Higginson** (ENG)	**10**
101	**Sean O'Sullivan** (ENG)	**10**
a	Liam Graham (SCO)	9
100	Peng Yisong (CHN)	4
a	**Michael Georgiou** (CYP)	**10**
93	**Sanderson Lam** (ENG)	**10**
a	Liam Pullen (ENG)	7
109	**Dechawat Poomjaeng** (THA)	**10**
Mink Nutcharut (THA)	7
84	**Barry Pinches** (ENG)	**10**
a	Ross Bulman (IRL)	6
83	**John Astley** (ENG)	**10**
a	Steven Hallworth (ENG)	9
110	Himanshu Jain (IND)	2
a	**Daniel Wells** (WAL)	**10**
94	Marco Fu (HKG)	5
a	**Martin O'Donnell** (ENG)	**10**
99	Andres Petrov (EST)	7
a	**Stan Moody** (ENG)	**10**
102	**Jamie O'Neill** (ENG)	**10**
a	Bulcsú Révész (HUN)	5
91	Dean Young (SCO)	5
a	**Haydon Pinhey** (ENG)	**10**
107	Mohamed Ibrahim (EGY)	6
**Anton Kazakov** (UKR)	**10**
86	**Dylan Emery** (WAL)	**10**
a	Ma Hai Long (CHN)	4
87	Michael Judge (IRL)	2
a	**Florian Nüßle** (AUT)	**10**
106	**Asjad Iqbal** (PAK)	**10**
Jenson Kendrick (ENG)	3
90	**Aaron Hill** (IRL)	**10**
a	Baipat Siripaporn (THA)	3
103	**Allan Taylor** (ENG)	**10**
a	Filips Kalniņš (LAT)	0
98	Muhammad Asif (PAK)	2
a	**Iulian Boiko** (UKR)	**10**
95	**Alfie Burden** (ENG)	**10**
Rebecca Kenna (ENG)	3
111	**Adam Duffy** (ENG)	**10**
a	Billy Joe Castle (ENG)	8
82	**David Lilley** (ENG)	**10**
a	Rory McLeod (JAM)	7

**Round 2 (Last 112)**; Best of 19 frames
80	Lukas Kleckers (GER)	8
81	**Ashley Hugill** (ENG)	**10**
49	**Scott Donaldson** (SCO)	**10**
a	Liam Davies (WAL)	1
65	**Xu Si** (CHN)	**10**
96	Zak Surety (ENG)	4
64	Hammad Miah (ENG)	6
97	**Ken Doherty** (IRL)	**10**
57	**Oliver Lines** (ENG)	**10**
a	Michael Holt (ENG)	9
72	Julien Leclercq (BEL)	6
89	**Ben Mertens** (BEL)	**10**
56	**Elliot Slessor** (ENG)	**10**
a	Ian Martin (ENG)	3
73	Lei Peifan (CHN)	6
88	**James Cahill** (ENG)	**10**
76	Duane Jones (WAL)	7
85	**Andrew Pagett** (WAL)	**10**
53	**Jackson Page** (WAL)	**10**
a	Ross Muir (SCO)	2
69	Louis Heathcote (ENG)	7
a	**Andrew Higginson** (ENG)	**10**
60	**David Grace** (ENG)	**10**
101	Sean O'Sullivan (ENG)	8
61	**Mark Davis** (ENG)	**10**
a	Michael Georgiou (CYP)	8
68	Mitchell Mann (ENG)	5
93	**Sanderson Lam** (ENG)	**10**
52	**Matthew Stevens** (WAL)	**10**
109	Dechawat Poomjaeng (THA)	8
77	Fraser Patrick (SCO)	6
84	**Barry Pinches** (ENG)	**10**
78	Craig Steadman (ENG)	8
83	**John Astley** (ENG)	**10**
51	**Ben Woollaston** (ENG)	**10**
a	Daniel Wells (WAL)	6
67	Jimmy White (ENG)	4
a	**Martin O'Donnell** (ENG)	**10**
62	**Zhang Anda** (CHN)	**10**
a	Stan Moody (ENG)	3
59	**Andy Hicks** (ENG)	**10**
102	Jamie O'Neill (ENG)	7
70	**Peter Lines** (ENG)	**10**
a	Haydon Pinhey (ENG)	6
54	**Mark Joyce** (ENG)	**10**
Anton Kazakov (UKR)	3
75	**Ian Burns** (ENG)	**10**
86	Dylan Emery (WAL)	9
74	**Si Jiahui** (CHN)	**10**
a	Florian Nüßle (AUT)	7
55	**Dominic Dale** (WAL)	**10**
106	Asjad Iqbal (PAK)	6
71	Michael White (WAL)	3
90	**Aaron Hill** (IRL)	**10**
58	**Wu Yize** (CHN)	**10**
103	Allan Taylor (ENG)	7
63	Stuart Carrington (ENG)	5
a	**Iulian Boiko** (UKR)	**10**
66	Alexander Ursenbacher (SUI)	7
95	**Alfie Burden** (ENG)	**10**
50	**Jak Jones** (WAL)	**10**
111	Adam Duffy (ENG)	6
79	Gerard Greene (NIR)	9
82	**David Lilley** (ENG)	**10**

**Round 3 (Last 80)**; Best of 19 frames
17	**Ryan Day** (WAL)	**10**
81	Ashley Hugill (ENG)	8
48	Yuan Sijun (CHN)	7
49	**Scott Donaldson** (SCO)	**10**
32	Jamie Jones (WAL)	7
65	**Xu Si** (CHN)	**10**
33	**Pang Junxu** (CHN)	**10**
97	Ken Doherty (IRL)	6
40	**Anthony Hamilton** (ENG)	**10**
57	Oliver Lines (ENG)	9
25	**Jimmy Robertson** (ENG)	**10**
89	Ben Mertens (BEL)	6
41	Liam Highfield (ENG)	9
56	**Elliot Slessor** (ENG)	**10**
24	**Zhou Yuelong** (CHN)	**10**
88	James Cahill (ENG)	4
21	**Hossein Vafaei** (IRN)	**10**
85	Andrew Pagett (WAL)	4
44	Martin Gould (ENG)	6
53	**Jackson Page** (WAL)	**10**
28	Joe O'Connor (ENG)	8
a	**Andrew Higginson** (ENG)	**10**
37	Sam Craigie (ENG)	8
60	**David Grace** (ENG)	**10**
36	Lyu Haotian (CHN)	8
61	**Mark Davis** (ENG)	**10**
29	**Joe Perry** (ENG)	**10**
93	Sanderson Lam (ENG)	8
45	Jamie Clarke (WAL)	3
52	**Matthew Stevens** (WAL)	**10**
20	**David Gilbert** (ENG)	**10**
84	Barry Pinches (ENG)	3
19	**Anthony McGill** (SCO)	**10**
83	John Astley (ENG)	9
46	**Cao Yupeng** (CHN)	**10**
51	Ben Woollaston (ENG)	6
30	**Noppon Saengkham** (THA)	**10**
a	Martin O'Donnell (ENG)	6
35	Xiao Guodong (CHN)	5
62	**Zhang Anda** (CHN)	**10**
38	**Graeme Dott** (SCO)	**10**
59	Andy Hicks (ENG)	6
27	**Matthew Selt** (ENG)	**10**
70	Peter Lines (ENG)	7
43	**Thepchaiya Un-Nooh** (THA)	**10**
54	Mark Joyce (ENG)	5
22	**Ricky Walden** (ENG)	**10**
75	Ian Burns (ENG)	6
23	Tom Ford (ENG)	5
74	**Si Jiahui** (CHN)	**10**
42	**Jordan Brown** (NIR)	**10**
55	Dominic Dale (WAL)	7
26	**Chris Wakelin** (ENG)	**10**
90	Aaron Hill (IRL)	2
39	Tian Pengfei (CHN)	2
58	**Wu Yize** (CHN)	**10**
34	**Fan Zhengyi** (CHN)	**10**
a	Iulian Boiko (UKR)	8
31	**Stephen Maguire (SCO)**	**10**
95	Alfie Burden (ENG)	4
47	Robbie Williams (ENG)	9
50	**Jak Jones** (WAL)	**10**
18	**Barry Hawkins** (ENG)	**10**
82	David Lilley (ENG)	4

**Round 4 (Last 48)**; Best of 19 frames
17	(Wales) **Ryan Day**	**10**
49	(Scotland) Scott Donaldson (Note: Donaldson retired at 4–0 due to medical reasons.)	0
65	(China) Xu Si	5
33	(China) **Pang Junxu**	**10**
40	(England) Anthony Hamilton	2
25	(England) **Jimmy Robertson**	**10**
56	(England) **Elliot Slessor**	**10**
24	(China) Zhou Yuelong	5
21	(Iran) **Hossein Vafaei**	**10**
53	(Wales) Jackson Page	6
a	(England) Andrew Higginson	5
60	(England) **David Grace**	**10**
61	(England) Mark Davis	9
29	(England) **Joe Perry**	**10**
52	(Wales) Matthew Stevens	7
20	(England) **David Gilbert**	**10**
19	(Scotland) **Anthony McGill**	**10**
46	(China) Cao Yupeng	6
30	(Thailand) **Noppon Saengkham**	**10**
62	(China) Zhang Anda	9
38	(Scotland) Graeme Dott	6
27	(England) **Matthew Selt**	**10**
43	(Thailand) Thepchaiya Un-Nooh	9
22	(England) **Ricky Walden**	**10**
74	(China) **Si Jiahui**	**10**
42	(Northern Ireland) Jordan Brown	7
26	(England) Chris Wakelin	8
58	(China) **Wu Yize**	**10**
34	(China) **Fan Zhengyi**	**10**
31	(Scotland) Stephen Maguire	6
50	(Wales) **Jak Jones**	**10**
18	(England) Barry Hawkins	8

== Century breaks ==
=== Main stage centuries ===
A total of 90 century breaks were made during the main stage of the tournament. Two players made maximum breaks of 147: Kyren Wilson in the fifth frame of his first-round match against Ryan Day and Mark Selby in the 16th frame of the final.

- 147, 134, 131, 123, 122, 112, 112, 110, 109, 103, 103, 100 – Mark Selby
- 147, 133, 120, 108, 102 – Kyren Wilson
- 146, 146, 138, 123, 100 – Neil Robertson
- 143 – Ali Carter
- 141, 128, 119, 117, 113, 113, 112, 112, 108, 103, 101, 100 – Luca Brecel
- 138, 124, 122, 100, 100 – Jak Jones
- 137, 136, 134, 128, 124, 114, 102 – John Higgins
- 137, 126, 101 – Mark Allen
- 134, 108, 103 – Stuart Bingham
- 134 – Ding Junhui
- 133 – Pang Junxu
- 132, 125, 122, 120, 106, 105, 103, 102 – Si Jiahui
- 131, 120, 102 – Shaun Murphy
- 131, 109 – Gary Wilson
- 130, 124, 119, 112, 110 – Anthony McGill
- 130 – Noppon Saengkham
- 128, 116, 107, 102 – Ronnie O'Sullivan
- 123 – Matthew Selt
- 122, 117 – Hossein Vafaei
- 122, 110 – Fan Zhengyi
- 121 – David Gilbert
- 119, 102 – Jack Lisowski
- 118, 113 – Mark Williams
- 107, 107 – Wu Yize

=== Qualifying stage centuries ===
A total of 135 century breaks were made during the qualifying rounds.

- 146 – Ryan Day
- 145, 142, 131, 130, 123, 117, 105 – Thepchaiya Un-Nooh
- 143, 132 – Joe Perry
- 140, 111, 102 – Oliver Lines
- 140, 111 – Barry Pinches
- 140, 105, 101, 100 – Wu Yize
- 140 – Sean O'Sullivan
- 138, 135, 117, 111 – Elliot Slessor
- 137, 128 – Lei Peifan
- 137 – Ken Doherty
- 137 – Ross Muir
- 136, 116, 106, 102 – Louis Heathcote
- 136, 106 – Anthony McGill
- 136 – Ben Mertens
- 133, 125, 119, 109 – David Lilley
- 133, 107 – Yuan Sijun
- 132 – Fergal O'Brien
- 131, 129 – Alexander Ursenbacher
- 131, 102, 101 – Fan Zhengyi
- 130, 116, 103, 101, 101 – Ricky Walden
- 130, 115, 103 – David Gilbert
- 130 – Dylan Emery
- 129, 124, 113 – Dominic Dale
- 129, 103 – Lyu Haotian
- 128, 127, 125, 119, 108 – John Astley
- 127, 127, 125, 102, 100 – Zhang Anda
- 127, 116 – Haydon Pinhey
- 127 – Andy Hicks
- 126, 115, 102 – Si Jiahui
- 126, 100 – Iulian Boiko
- 125, 106 – Andrew Higginson
- 125 – Marco Fu
- 124, 105 – Ian Burns
- 122 – Sanderson Lam
- 121, 120 – David Grace
- 120 – Craig Steadman
- 117 – Noppon Saengkham
- 117 – Matthew Stevens
- 116, 104, 103 – Zhou Yuelong
- 115, 101, 101, 100 – Jak Jones
- 115 – Ng On-yee
- 115 – Hossein Vafaei
- 114 – Ross Bulman
- 113 – Jamie Clarke
- 111 – Scott Donaldson
- 110 – Stan Moody
- 110 – Allan Taylor
- 109 – Matthew Selt
- 106, 104 – Jamie O'Neill
- 106, 103 – Aaron Hill
- 106, 102 – Jackson Page
- 106, 100 – Chris Wakelin
- 106 – Ben Woollaston
- 105, 101 – Joe O'Connor
- 105, 101 – Xu Si
- 105 – Asjad Iqbal
- 104, 104 – Mark Davis
- 104, 102 – Pang Junxu
- 102 – Stephen Hendry
- 102 – George Pragnell
- 102 – Liam Pullen
- 101, 100 – Robbie Williams
- 101 – Liam Graham
- 101 – Andres Petrov
- 100 – James Cahill
- 100 – Gao Yang
- 100 – Mink Nutcharut
- 100 – Dechawat Poomjaeng
- 100 – Daniel Wells
