= Dutch Quarter, Colchester =

Historic area in Colchester, Essex, England

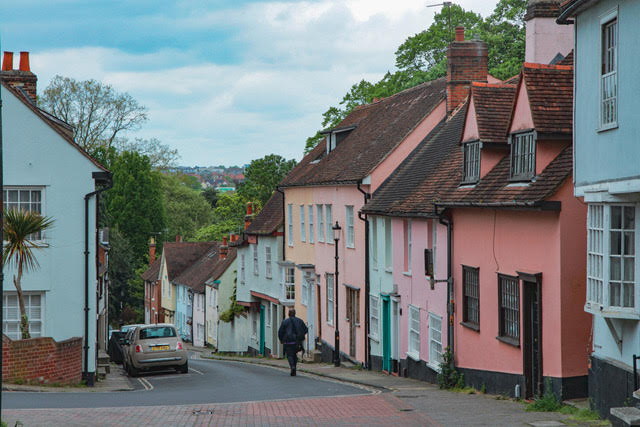
Dutch Quarter in 2024

The Dutch Quarter is a historic area located just north of Colchester High Street in Essex, England. It includes Maidenburgh Street, West Stockwell Street, East Stockwell Street, Stockwell, St Helen's Lane, Northgate Street, and Nunn's Road. Other historic streets and areas include Dutch Court, Middle Mill, Northgate Street, formally known as 'Dutch Lane', Quakers Alley, Quakers Court, Sir Isaacs Walk, and St Helen's Lane.

== Name origin ==
It is thought that the name Dutch Quarter was not used until after the Second World War. Prior to that, the area was referred to simply as The North, referencing its location near North Bridge. In the 16th century, the term 'Dutch' was commonly used to describe immigrants from Belgium, the Netherlands, and France.

== History ==
=== Flemish settlement ===
The Dutch Quarter became home to Flemish Protestant refugees, often referred to as the Dutch Weavers, in the late 16th century. These settlers fled religious persecution in the Low Countries and established a thriving textiles industry in Colchester, particularly producing a type of cloth known as bay. The area's proximity to the River Colne made it ideal for textiles production.

Some of the houses they lived in were typically painted red and green with white window frames, reflecting Dutch architectural styles. Many feature distinctive weaver's windows- large horizontal windows designed to maximise light for weaving activities. Over 60 of these historic homes still stand today.

=== Roman and medieval foundations ===
Parts of the Dutch Quarter were built over Roman roads and foundations. A Roman Theatre was located in the area under Maidenburgh Street and St Helen's Lane.

By the 14th century, Flemish weavers had begun settling in Colchester under invitation from Edward III to support the production of Colchester russets, a type of textile. Historical court records from this time reference several local businesses, including an ironmonger on East Stockwell Street, and community wells for water supply.

=== Jewish community ===
In the 1770s, a small Jewish population settled in the Dutch Quarter. A synagogue in a house, located off Stockwell Street, was active until approximately 1795.

== Notable buildings ==
- Peake's House: Grade II listed building historically used by fullers, dyers, and tanners located on East Stockwell Street and ideal in the centre of the medieval market area in the High Street.
- East Hill House: Grade I listed building built by wealthy merchant tailor George Wegg.
- Blue Coats School: Now known as the Old School House. Bluecoats prepared children for apprentices which bay makers took on.
- Taylor House: Grade II listed building, home to Ann and Jane Taylor, authors of Twinkle, Twinkle Little Star. Located at 11-12 West Stockwell Street. A commemorative plaque marks the site.
- Dutch Church: In 1563, the Dutch Refugee Church was built on the corner of Head Street and Church Street.
- St Helen Lane and Chapel: The oldest building in the Dutch Quarter, dedicated to Saint Helena, mother of the Roman Emperor Constantine. Her statue now appears on Colchester Town Hall. The Normals restored the chapel in 1076 and used nearby Roman ruins to construct Colchester Castle.
- Bishop Blaise Inn (No. 35 West Stockwell Street): A former meeting place for wool combers, named after their patron saint.

== Archaeological finds ==
Excavations in Stockwell Street uncovered large amounts of sheep bones dating from the 16th and 17th centuries, suggesting the presence of a tannery.

== See also ==
- Bay (cloth)
- Russet (cloth)
