= Baize =

Coarse woollen cloth, similar in texture to felt

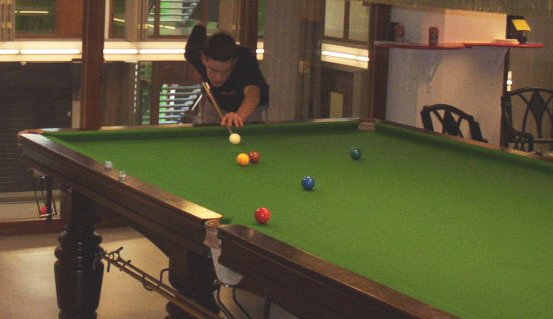
A baize-covered snooker table

Baize is a coarse woollen (or in cheaper variants cotton) cloth, similar in texture to felt, but more durable.

== History ==
A mid-17th-century English ditty – much quoted in histories of ale and beer brewing in England – refers to 1525:

Hops, heresies, bays, and beer;
Came into England all in one year.

Heresies refers to the Protestant Reformation, while bays is the Elizabethan spelling for baize (though bay and baize eventually came to describe two similar but distinguishable types of cloth, as described below).

== Applications ==
Baize is often used on billiard tables to cover the slate and cushions, and is also used on different kinds of gaming tables such as those for blackjack, baccarat, craps and other casino games. It is also found as a writing surface, particularly on 19th century pedestal desks.

The surface finish of baize is coarse, thus increasing rolling resistance and perceptibly slowing billiard balls. Baize is available with and without a perceptible nap. Snooker, in which understanding nap effects is part of the game, uses the nappy variety, while pool and carom billiards use the napless type.

For gaming use, baize is traditionally dyed green, in mimicry of a lawn (see), though wide variety of table colours have become accepted. Bay was similar material to baize, but lighter in weight and with a shorter nap.

Baize
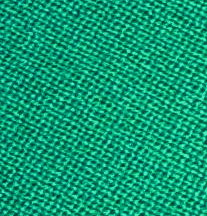
A closeup of the weave of worsted baize. This particular sample is Simonis 760, a high-end pool cloth; it is napless, unlike snooker cloth.

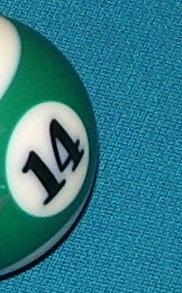
A similar cloth sample as in the previous image, from further away and with a pool ball for scale.

== Idioms and catchphrases ==
- "Let's get the boys on the baize!" has been a catchphrase of BBC TV snooker presenter Rob Walker since 2008.
- At one time, "the green baize door" (a door to which cloth had been tacked to deaden noise) in a house separated the servants' quarters from the family's living quarters; hence the phrase's usage as a metonym for domestic service.
- Moving men in the children's book The Railway Children wore green baize aprons.

== See also ==
- Billy the Kid and the Green Baize Vampire
