= Bay (cloth) =

Coarse woolen cloth like Baize but lighter and with shorter pile

Bay (Bayette, Bayeta) was a napped coarse woolen fabric, not technically considered cloth, introduced to England by Flemish immigrants in the 16th century. It was produced in Essex at Colchester and Bocking, and also in various towns in the West of England. Production continued until the 19th century. Bays were made into linings for furniture, hangings, curtains, bed surroundings, and cloaks.

== Colchester bays ==
Colchester bays had a reputation for high quality in the 17th and 18th centuries. Bay making was introduced to Colchester in the 15th century following economic and social change after the Black Death. Enhanced wages for workers in this period created an increased demand for better quality clothing. Colchester had been producing russets for common clothes and experienced a decrease in demand due to this. To revive the textile industry in Colchester, Edward III issued letters of protection to Flemish immigrants fleeing persecution from Catholic Spain. Weavers were invited to settle in Colchester to establish the bay trade and teach local weavers the skills required to make bay. The River Colne bank provided space to set up tenters, and fulling mills developed around the town, including the area now known as the Dutch Quarter. The Dutch Bay Hall was established in Colchester to search and check the bays for a high standard and quality. They were given cloth seals marking their production at Colchester. Bay was mostly exported to the clergy in Spain and Portugal. Priests (Quakers) dyed them green and wore them as aprons. The Spanish King and Mexican Grandees wore cloaks of bay over their other finery. Monks and nuns wore black dyed bays. Colchester Museum has a piece of bay in their collection.

== Characteristics ==
Bay was similar to baize but lighter in weight and with a shorter nap. Bay was a plain weave fabric with worsted warp and woolen weft, although examination of a sample of Colchester bay surviving in 1903 revealed it to have a twill weave. Strips of bay were created at least two yards wide and weighed 30 pounds.

== Bay making process ==
Raw material was delivered to the mill after being sorted by the wool stapler to ensure the yarn is not uneven. It would be beaten to remove knots and dirt. The material arrived fleeced. It was washed with soap, then partly dried. When dry, the material was pressed through two sets of rollers to turn it into locks then slivers. Sometimes it would be oiled with linseed oil. The material was then delivered to the spinners. Before the Industrial Revolution, spinsters would spin the wool in village cottages, twisting the fibres into long threads of yarn. After the invention of the Spinning Jenny, a man would walk backwards drawing out threads from the machine and turn the handles to twist the threads. Spun yarn was sent to the weavers warehouses where it was sized with glue and urine then hung out to dry so it would run well though the loom. The yarn was made into cloth on the loom by running threads parallel to each other to create warps and then crossing the warp with threads inserted sideways to create wefts. The cloth then returned to the mill to be washed with ashes, linseed oil and urine before being fulled on wooden beams in water streams to thicken the cloth. The cloth was washed in the stream then stretched on tenterhooks with fumes of burning sulphur to turn the cloth white. A nap would be raised on the cloth when dry using the heads of teazels. The bay was then packed up and sent to the Dutch Bay Hall for inspection before the Merchant Adventurers took the bay to sell in the London markets.
