= Rob Walker (sports announcer) =

British sports commentator (born 1975)

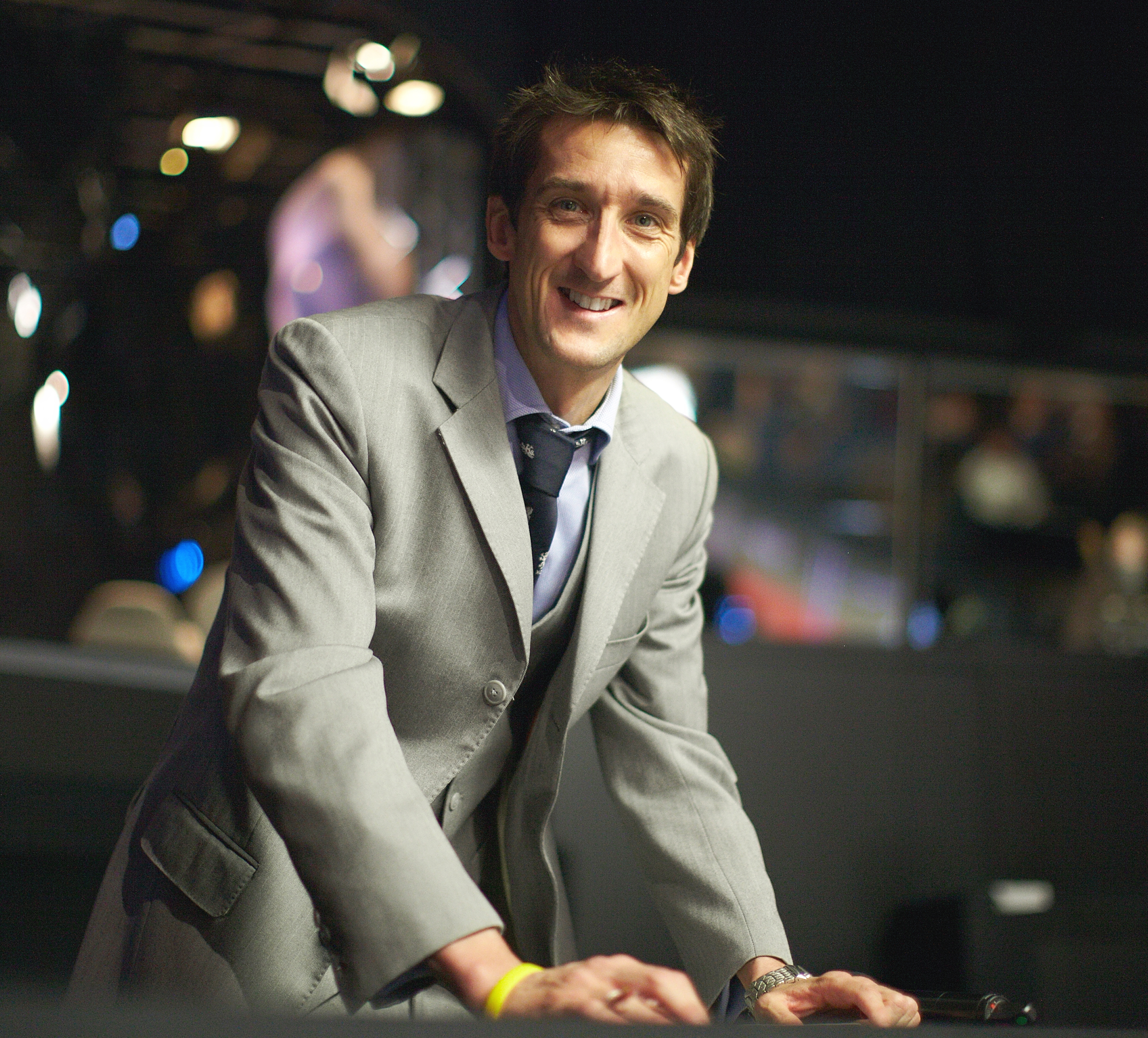
- Walker in 2012
- Born: Robert Joseph Walker; 13 March 1975 (age 51); Oxford, Oxfordshire, England
- Occupations: Sports commentator, television presenter and freelance reporter
- Years active: 2000–present

Robert Joseph Walker (born 13 March 1975) is a British sports commentator, television presenter and freelance reporter who has covered sports including tennis, snooker, Alpine skiing, darts, boxing, football, sailing and athletics for the BBC, Channel 4, ITV, Setanta Sports and the IAAF.

== Early life ==
Walker was born in Oxford and was educated at Abingdon School and the University of Exeter.

== Career ==
Since 2008 he has appeared in the role of master of ceremonies at major televised snooker tournaments, including the World Snooker Championship, where he uses the catchphrase "Let's get the boys on the baize". He has also presented a highlights show at the World Championship for the last two years called Snooker on the Red, featuring on the BBC Red Button and has been host of the Global Snooker Awards.

Alongside this role on the BBC, he has presented sailing for the BBC at the Olympic Games in 2008 in Beijing and 2012 in London, he has commentated on biathlon, ski jumping, and cross-country skiing for the BBC at every Winter Olympics since 2010. He has reported on the London Marathon and Great North Run every year from 2009 to 2012 and from 2013 has commentated on the races for the BBC Red Button and BBC website. He has presented the Winmau World Masters in 2009 and reported at every BDO World Darts Championship from the Lakeside Country Club since 2010 alongside Colin Murray while presenting Darts Extra during the night. In the 2010 FIFA World Cup he travelled around South Africa for the BBC reporting with his namesake Dan Walker on the BBC Bus. Since 2013 he has also been the voiceover on BBC One's gameshow A Question of Sport.

In 2011, he joined the athletics team on Channel 4 which included the Indoor European Championships and World Championships alongside John Rawling, Iwan Thomas, Dean Macey, Katherine Merry, and Michael Johnson. He continued to work for Channel 4 in August/September 2012 when Walker began commentating on the athletics events at the 2012 Summer Paralympics for Channel 4 alongside Rawling, Danny Crates and Katherine Merry. He also commentated on Biathlon and Cross Country Skiing for Channel 4's Winter Paralympic Coverage.

He also worked for ITV for a brief time reporting on the Boat Race when they held the rights (these have since reverted to the BBC) and boxing, where he was a reporter on the Big Fight Live on ITV4: this coverage has also moved, to Channel 5. He also hosted parts of the 2015 Snooker World Grand Prix coverage on ITV4.

In 2018, he presented the Bowls: Scottish International Open for BBC Sport Scotland broadcast on BBC Two Scotland.

== Personal life ==
Walker is married and has a son.
