= 1987 Clacton Professional =

Professional snooker tournament in England

Tournament information
- Dates: 24–28 August 1987
- Venue: Clacton Snooker Centre
- City: Clacton
- Country: England
- Organisation: WPBSA
- Format: Non-Ranking event
- Total prize fund: £10,000
- Winner's share: £3,000

Final
- Champion: Mike Hallett (ENG)
- Runner-up: Jack McLaughlin (NIR)
- Score: 6–1

The 1987 Clacton Professional, also known as the Essex Royal Professional, was a non-ranking professional snooker tournament held at Clacton Snooker Centre, Clacton, from 24 to 28 August 1987. The tournament was for lower-ranked professional players. It was sponsored by the Essex Royal Hotel, and the World Professional Billiards and Snooker Association contributed £5,000 to the prize fund.

Mike Hallett won the title by defeating Jack McLaughlin 6–1 in the final, after taking a 5–0 lead. Hallett was the top seed among the entrants, having won the 1986 edition. Dean Reynolds was the highest-ranked player to participate, standing at 15th in the 1987–88 snooker world rankings, one place above Hallett. Hallet took £3,000 prize money as winner, with McLaughlin receiving £1,500. Losing semi-finalists received £600, and losing quarter-finalists received £300. The total prize fund was £10,000.

Joe O'Boye received a bye to the quarter finals after Tony Jones and David Roe, who were due to play each other in the first round, and Jim Wych, who was due to play the winner of that match, all failed to appear at the tournament. Jon Wright withdrew as he refused to wear a lounge suit for the event.

A pro-am event at the same venue, sponsored by Pot Black magazine, concluded on 23 August. Tony Drago defeated amateur Wayne Keeble 4–2 in the final of the pro-am and received £1,000 of the £2,700 prize fund as winner.

== Results ==
Results are shown below.

Preliminary round
Player	Score	Player
Nigel Gilbert (ENG)	4–1	Clive Everton (WAL)
Martin Smith (ENG)	w.o.	Bernard Bennett (ENG)
Terry Whitthread (ENG)	4–1	Dennis Hughes (ENG)

Main Draw

First round
Mario Morra (CAN)	4
Graham Cripsey (ENG)	3
Paul Gibson (ENG)	4
Paddy Browne (IRE)	3
Graham Miles (ENG)	4
Dave Gilbert (ENG)	0
Vic Harris (ENG)	4
Steve Newbury (WAL)	3
Malcolm Bradley (ENG)	4
Mike Darrington (ENG)	0
Tony Chappel (WAL)	4
Nigel Gilbert (ENG)	3
Colin Roscoe (WAL)	4
Paul Medati (ENG)	2
Ken Owers (ENG)	4
Martin Smith (ENG)	0
Joe O'Boye (IRE)	4
John Rea (SCO)	0
Tony Jones (ENG)	w.d.
David Roe (ENG)	w.d.
Matt Gibson (SCO)	w.o.
Bob Harris (ENG)
Mark Bennett (WAL)	4
Mick Fisher (ENG)	1
Jim Donnelly (SCO)	w.o.
Jon Wright (ENG)
Tommy Murphy (NIR)	4
Glen Wilkinson (AUS)	2
Jack McLaughlin (NIR)	4
Bill Oliver (ENG)	3
Terry Whitthread (ENG)	4
Steve James (ENG)	3

Second round
Mike Hallett (ENG)	4
Mario Morra (CAN)	2
Warren King (AUS)	3
Paul Gibson (ENG)	4
Murdo MacLeod (SCO)	2
Graham Miles (ENG)	4
Barry West (ENG)	2
Vic Harris (ENG)	4
John Campbell (AUS)	4
Malcolm Bradley (ENG)	3
Wayne Jones (WAL)	4
Tony Chappel (WAL)	2
Dene O'Kane (NZL)	4
Colin Roscoe (WAL)	2
Kirk Stevens (CAN)
Ken Owers (ENG)	w.o.
Peter Francisco (RSA)	2
Joe O'Boye (IRE)	4
Jim Wych (CAN)	Bye
Tony Drago (MLT)	4
Matt Gibson (SCO)	1
Eugene Hughes (IRL)	3
Mark Bennett (WAL)	4
Dave Martin (ENG)	4
Jim Donnelly (SCO)	3
Steve Longworth (ENG)	4
Tommy Murphy (NIR)	2
Steve Duggan (ENG)	0
Jack McLaughlin (NIR)	4
Dean Reynolds (ENG)	4
Terry Whitthread (ENG)	0

Third Round
Mike Hallett (ENG)	4
Paul Gibson (ENG)	1
Graham Miles (ENG)	3
Vic Harris (ENG)	4
John Campbell (AUS)	3
Wayne Jones (WAL)	4
Dene O'Kane (NZL)	4
Ken Owers (ENG)	0
Joe O'Boye (ENG)	w.o.
Jim Wych (CAN)
Tony Drago (MLT)	2
Mark Bennett (WAL)	4
Dave Martin (ENG)	2
Steve Longworth (ENG)	4
Jack McLaughlin (NIR)	4
Dean Reynolds (ENG)	0

Quarter-finals
Mike Hallett (ENG)	4
Vic Harris (ENG)	2
Wayne Jones (WAL)	2
Dene O'Kane (NZL)	4
Joe O'Boye (IRE)	2
Mark Bennett (WAL)	4
Steve Longworth (ENG)	0
Jack McLaughlin (NIR)	4

Semi-finals
Mike Hallett (ENG)	5
Dene O'Kane (NZL)	2
Mark Bennett (WAL)	1
Jack McLaughlin (NIR)	5

Final
Mike Hallett (ENG)	6
Jack McLaughlin (NIR)	1
