= 1986 World Doubles Championship =

Hofmeister World Doubles
Tournament information
- Dates: 2–14 December 1986
- Venue: Derngate
- City: Northampton
- Country: England
- Format: Non-ranking event
- Total prize fund: £200,000
- Winner's share: £50,000
- Highest break: 217 Davis/Meo (combined)

Final
- Champion: Davis/Meo
- Runner-up: Hallett/Hendry
- Score: 12–3

The 1986 Hofmeister World Doubles was the fifth staging of the doubles snooker tournament. It was played at the Derngate in Northampton and held between 2 and 14 December 1986 with the tournament televised on ITV.

Steve Davis and Tony Meo went on to win their fourth title in five years by beating Mike Hallett and 17 year old Stephen Hendry 12–3 in the final, after leading 11–2 before the last session. The highest break of the tournament, calculated as the highest combined break made by playing partners in a single match, was 217 by Davis and Meo.

The winners received £50,000 prize money between them.

== Results ==
Results from the last 16 onwards are shown below. Winning players are denoted in bold.

Last 16; Best of 9 frames
**Steve Davis (ENG) /** **Tony Meo (ENG)**	**5**
Steve Duggan (ENG) / Barry West (ENG)	3
David Taylor (ENG) / Eddie Charlton (AUS)	1
**Silvino Francisco (RSA) /** **Peter Francisco (RSA)**	**5**
**Alex Higgins (NIR) /** **Jimmy White (ENG)**	**5**
Rex Williams (ENG) / Graham Miles (ENG)	2
**Dennis Taylor (NIR) /** **Terry Griffiths (WAL)**	**5**
Steve James (ENG)/ David Roe (ENG)	2
**John Parrott (ENG) /** **Neal Foulds (ENG)**	**5**
Murdo MacLeod (SCO) / Dave Martin (ENG)	2
Cliff Thorburn (CAN) / Willie Thorne (ENG)	4
**Stephen Hendry (SCO) /** **Mike Hallett (ENG)**	**5**
**Ray Reardon (WAL) /** **Tony Jones (ENG)**	**5**
Joe Johnson (ENG) / Tony Knowles (ENG)	4
**Kirk Stevens (CAN) /** **John Virgo (ENG)**	**5**
Doug Mountjoy (WAL)/ Wayne Jones (WAL)	4

Quarter-finals; Best of 9 frames
(England) **Steve Davis /** **(England) Tony Meo**	**5**
(South Africa) Silvino Francisco / (South Africa) Peter Francisco	0
(Northern Ireland) Alex Higgins / (England) Jimmy White	4
(Northern Ireland) **Dennis Taylor /** **(Wales) Terry Griffiths**	**5**
(England) John Parrott / (England) Neal Foulds	1
(Scotland) **Stephen Hendry /** **(England) Mike Hallett**	**5**
(Wales) Ray Reardon / (England) Tony Jones	2
(Canada) **Kirk Stevens /** **(England) John Virgo**	**5**

Semi-finals; Best of 17 frames
(England) **Steve Davis /** **(England) Tony Meo**	**9**
(Northern Ireland) Dennis Taylor / (Wales) Terry Griffiths	6
(Scotland) **Stephen Hendry /** **(England) Mike Hallett**	**9**
(Canada) Kirk Stevens / (England) John Virgo	2

Final; Best of 23 frames
(England) **Steve Davis /** **(England) Tony Meo**	**12**
(Scotland) Stephen Hendry / (England) Mike Hallett	3

== Selected earlier results ==
First two rounds played at Romiley Forum, Stockport 12–16 October 1986

Round 1

(England) (Republic of Ireland) Hargreaves/Burke	5–0	(England) (Canada) Meadowcroft/Morra
(England) (England) Wright/Whitthread	5– 4	(Canada) (Canada) Mikkelsen/Jonik
(England) (England) Darrlington/Oliver	5–0	(England) (India) Greaves/Agrawal
(England) (England) James/Roe	5– 4	(England) (England) Fitzmaurice/Rowswell
(England) (South Africa) Williamson/Grace	5–0	(Australia) (England) Jenkins/P. Gibson
(Republic of Ireland) (Northern Ireland) Kelly/Jackie Rea	5– 4	(Scotland) (Scotland) E. McLaughlin/John Rea
(England) (England) B. Bennett/Houlihan	5–0	(Canada) (South Africa) Bear/Mienie
(Scotland) (Wales) Donnnely/Roscoe	5– 1	(England) (England) N. Gilbert/Fisher
(England) (Scotland) Dunning/Demarco	5–1	(Australia) (Australia) Foldvari/Heywood
(Republic of Ireland) (Republic of Ireland) Watchorn/Sheehan	5– 2	(England) (Republic of Ireland) D. Hughes/Kearney

Round 2

(England) (Canada) Spencer/Rigitano	5– 1	(England) (Republic of Ireland) Hargreaves/Burke
(England) (England) Duggan/West	5– 4	(England) (England) Wright/Whitthread
(Canada) (Canada) Gauvreau/Chaperon	5– 4	(Republic of Ireland) (Northern Ireland) O'Boye/J. McLaughlin
(England) (England) V. Harris/D. Gilbert	5– 3	(England) (England) Reynolds/Longworth
(England) (England) Darrlington/Oliver	5– 1	(England) (England) B. Harris/Smith
(England) (England) James/Roe	5– 0	(England) (England) F. Davis/Watterson
(England) (South Africa) Williamson/Grace	5– 2	(Wales) (Wales) Chappel/M. Bennett
(England) (England) G. Foulds/Scott	5–4	(Scotland) (Scotland) Black/Sinclair
(England) (England) Wildman/Edmonds	5– 0	(Republic of Ireland) (Northern Ireland) Kelly/Jackie Rea
(Malta) (England) Drago/Owers	5–2	(England) (England) B. Bennett/Houlihan
(Scotland) (England) M. Gibson/Chalmers	w– o	(Republic of Ireland) (Thailand) E. Hughes/Sim Ngam
(Republic of Ireland) (Northern Ireland) Fagan/Murphy	5–1	(England) (Australia) Cripsey/Wilkinson
(Wales) (England) Newbury/Bales	5– 2	(England) (Republic of Ireland) Dodd/Bradley
(Scotland) (Wales) Donnnely/Roscoe	5– 1	(Republic of Ireland) (Canada) Browne/Medati
(England) (Scotland) Hallett/Hendry	5–1	(England) (Scotland) Dunning/Demarco
(Canada) (New Zealand) Wych/O'Kane	5–1	(Republic of Ireland) (Republic of Ireland) Watchorn/Sheehan

Round 3

Northampton 2–4 December

(England) (England) S. Davis/Meo	5– 1	(England) (Canada) Spencer/Rigitano
(England) (England) Duggan/West	5– 4	(Wales) (Australia) Wilson/King
(England) (Australia) David Taylor/Charlton	5– 1	(Canada) (Canada) Chaperon/Gauvreau
(South Africa) (South Africa) S. Francisco/P. Francisco	5–4	(Australia) (England) V. Harris/D. Gilbert
(Northern Ireland) (Wales) Dennis Taylor/Griffiths	5– 1	(England) (England) Darrlington/Oliver
(Australia) (South Africa) Campbell/Mans	5– 4	(England) (England) James/Roe
(England) (England) Williams/Miles	5– 3	(England) (South Africa) Williamson/Grace
(England) (Northern Ireland) White/Higgins	5– 2	(England) (England) Scott/G. Foulds
(England) (England) Johnson/Knowles	5– 2	(England) (England) Wildman/Edmonds
(Wales) (England) Reardon/T. Jones	5–3	(Malta) (England) Drago/Owers
(Wales) (Wales) Mountjoy/W. Jones	5– 1	(Scotland) (England) M. Gibson/Chalmers
(England) (Canada) Virgo/Stevens	5– 1	(Republic of Ireland) (Northern Ireland) Fagan/Murphy
(England) (England) Parrott/Foulds	5– 1	(Wales) (England) Newbury/Bales
(England) (Scotland) Martin/MacLeod	5– 0	(Scotland) (Wales) Donnnely/Roscoe
(Scotland) (England) Hendry/Hallett	5– 3	(Canada) (England) Werbeniuk/Fowler
(England) (Canada) Thorne/Thorburn	5– 2	(Canada) (New Zealand) Wych/O'Kane
