= 1987 World Doubles Championship =

Foster's World Doubles
Tournament information
- Dates: 1–13 December 1987
- Venue: Derngate
- City: Northampton
- Country: England
- Format: Non-ranking event
- Total prize fund: £250,000
- Winner's share: £60,000
- Highest break: 182 Hallett/Hendry (combined)

Final
- Champion: Hallett/Hendry
- Runner-up: Thorburn/Taylor
- Score: 12–8

The 1987 Foster's World Doubles was the sixth staging of the doubles snooker tournament. It was played at the Derngate in Northampton and held between 1 and 13 December 1987. Foster's became the sponsors for this tournament as part of the Courage Group as was previous sponsor Hofmeister.

Steve Davis and Tony Meo lost out in the pre-TV stages to Martin Clark and Jim Chambers 5–1. The previous year's finalists Mike Hallett and Stephen Hendry went on to win the final World Doubles beating Cliff Thorburn and Dennis Taylor 12–8 and also recorded the highest combined break of the televised phase, 182. Thorburn and Taylor took a 5–0 lead in the final, and the match was later level at 5–5, 6–6 and 7–7.

The size of the audiences at Northampton was a disappointment to the sponsors. The championship was discontinued as the sponsor's contract had expired, and there was a proliferation of other events.

== Prize fund ==
=== Prize fund ===
The winners of the event shared £60,000 from a total prize fund of £250,000. The breakdown of prize money for the event is shown below; the amounts are per team.

- Winners: £60,000
- Runners-up: £35,000
- Semi-finalists: £17,500
- Quarter-finalists: £8,750
- Last 16: £4,375
- Third round: £2,434
- Second round: £300
- Highest break (televised phase): £5,000 - Stephen Hendry (116) and Mike Hallett (66)
- Highest break (untelevised phase): £1,250 - Stephen Hendry (112) and Mike Hallett (60)

== Early rounds ==
Results are shown below. The first two rounds were played at the Crest Hotel, Portsmouth between 26 and 28 October 1987.

1st Round

(England) (England) Chambers/Clark	5–0	(Republic of Ireland) (Northern Ireland) Fagan/Jackie Rea
(England) (England) Lawlor/A. Harris	5–3	(England) (England) N. Gilbert/Fisher
(England) (England) Oliver/Darrington	5–4	(England) (England) Chalmers/Gary Wilkinson
(England) (Australia) Williamson/Foldvari	5–1	(South Africa) (England) Ellis/J. Smith
(Australia) (England) Jenkins/Heaton	w–o	(England) (South Africa) Hargreaves/Van Rensberg
(England) (England) D .Gilbert/M. Smith	5–0	(Republic of Ireland) (England) Kelly/Meakin
(England) (Canada) Fitzmaurice/Morra	w-o	(Scotland) (England) E. McLaughlin/D. Hughes
(Australia) (England) Glen Wilkinson/P. Gibson	5– 2	(Scotland) (Wales) Donnelly/Roscoe
(Canada) (England) Bear/Greaves	5–2	(Republic of Ireland) (Republic of Ireland) Burke/Kearney
(Scotland) (Scotland) Sinclair/Black	w–o	(Republic of Ireland) (Republic of Ireland) Watchorn/Sheehan

2nd Round

(England) (England) Chambers/Clark	5–1	(England) (Northern Ireland) Browne/McLaughlin
(England) (England) James/Roe	5– 0	(Wales) (England) Bennett/Marshall
(England) (Wales) Bales/Newbury	5–1	(England) (England) Lawlor/A. Harris
(England) (England) West/Duggan	5–0	(England) (England) Oliver/Darrington
(England) (England) Bradley/Dodd	5–2	(England) (England) Meadowcroft/Scott
(England) (Australia) Williamson/Foldvari	5–2	(England) (England) G. Foulds/V. Harris
(England) (England) Wildman/Edmonds	5–3	(Australia) (England) Jenkins/Heaton
(Canada) (Canada) Gauvreau/Chaperon	5–1	(Scotland) (Scotland) M. Gibson/John Rea
(New Zealand) (Canada) O'Kane/Wych	w–o	(England) (England) F. Davis/Watterson
(England) (England) Gilbert/Smith	5–1	(England) (England) Wright/Whitthread
(England) (England) Cripsey/Longworth	5–4	(England) (Canada) Fitzmaurice/Morra
(Wales) (England) Reardon/T. Jones	5–3	(Australia) (England) Wilkinson/P. Gibson
(Northern Ireland) (Wales) Murphy/Chappel	w.o.	(Canada) (England) Mikklesen/Medati
(Canada) (England) Werbeniuk/Fowler	5–0	(South Africa) (Canada) Grace/Rigitano
(Northern Ireland) (England) O'Boye/B. Harris	5–0	(Canada) (England) Bear/Greaves
(Malta) (England) Drago/Owers	5–0	(Scotland) (Scotland) Sinclair/Black

3rd Round

(England) (England) Chambers/Clark	5–1	(England) (England) S. Davis/Meo
(England) (England) James/Roe	5– 2	(England) (England) Martin/Spencer
(England) (Canada) Virgo/Stevens	5–3	(England) (Wales) Bales/Newbury
(England) (England) Parrott/Reynolds	5–2	(England) (England) West/Duggan
(England) (England) Johnson/Knowles	5–0	(England) (England) Bradley/Dodd
(Scotland) (Australia) MacLeod/Campbell	5–4	(England) (Australia) Williamson/Foldvari
(England) (Australia) David Taylor/Charlton	5–3	(England) (England) Wildman/Edmonds
(Canada) (Northern Ireland) Thorburn/Dennis Taylor	5–1	(Canada) (Canada) Gauvreau/Chaperon
(New Zealand) (Canada) O'Kane/Wych	5–3	(England) (England) White/Thorne
(Wales) (Australia) Wilson/King	5–3	(England) (England) Gilbert/Smith
(Wales) (Wales) Mountjoy/W. Jones	5–3	(England) (England) Cripsey/Longworth
(South Africa) (South Africa) S. Francisco/P. Francisco	5–3	(Wales) (England) Reardon/T. Jones
(Northern Ireland) (Republic of Ireland) Higgins/E. Hughes	5–2	(Northern Ireland) (Wales) Murphy/Chappel
(Scotland) (England) Hendry/Hallett	5–2	(Canada) (England) Werbeniuk/Fowler
(England) (England) Williams/Miles	5–1	(Northern Ireland) (England) O'Boye/Harris
(Wales) (England) Griffiths/Foulds	5–2	(Malta) (England) Drago/Owers

== Last 16 onwards ==
Results are shown below.

Last 16; Best of 9 frames
(England) (England) Chambers/Clark	3
(England) (England) James/Roe	5
(England) (England) Parrott/Reynolds	5
(England) (Canada) Virgo/Stevens	0
(England) (England) Johnson/Knowles	5
(Scotland) (Australia) MacLeod/Campbell	1
(Northern Ireland) (Canada) Taylor/Thorburn	5
(England) (Australia) Taylor/Charlton	2
(Canada) (New Zealand) Wych/O'Kane	5
(Wales) (Australia) Wilson/King	2
(Wales) (Wales) Mountjoy/Jones	3
(South Africa) (South Africa) S Francisco/P Francisco	5
(Northern Ireland) (Republic of Ireland) Higgins/Hughes	2
(Scotland) (England) Hendry/Hallett	5
(England) (England) Williams/Miles	3
(Wales) (England) Griffiths/Foulds	5

Quarter-finals; Best of 9 frames
(England) (England) James/Roe	5
(England) (England) Parrott/Reynolds	2
(England) (England) Johnson/Knowles	0
(Northern Ireland) (Canada) Taylor/Thorburn	5
(South Africa) (South Africa) S Francisco/P Francisco	5
(Canada) (New Zealand) Wych/O'Kane	1
(Scotland) (England) Hendry/Hallett	5
(Wales) (England) Griffiths/Foulds	1

Semi-finals; Best of 17 frames
(England) (England) James/Roe	1
(Northern Ireland) (Canada) Taylor/Thorburn	9
(South Africa) (South Africa) S Francisco/P Francisco	4
(Scotland) (England) Hendry/Hallett	9

Final; Best of 23 frames
(Northern Ireland) (Canada) Taylor/Thorburn	8
(Scotland) (England) Hendry/Hallett	12
