= 1990 Shoot-Out =

Shoot-Out
Tournament information
- Dates: 26–28 September 1990
- Venue: Trentham Gardens
- City: Stoke-on-Trent
- Country: England
- Organisation: WPBSA
- Format: Non-ranking event
- Total prize fund: £40,000
- Winner's share: £5,000
- Highest break: Tony Knowles (ENG) (120)

Final
- Champion: (Wales) Darren Morgan
- Runner-up: (England) Mike Hallett
- Score: 2–1

The 1990 Shoot-Out was a professional non-ranking snooker tournament that took place from 26 to 28 September 1990 at Trentham Gardens in Stoke-on-Trent, England.

Darren Morgan won the tournament, defeating Mike Hallett 2–1 in the best of three frames final. All other matches were decided by a single frame.

Jimmy White, the fourth seed, withdrew from the tournament at short notice, explaining that he had broken his cue. Bill Oliver was injured in a road traffic incident collision whilst driving to the venue on 27 September and withdrew from the tournament; Hallett, his passenger, was uninjured. The reigning world champion, Stephen Hendry, was eliminated by Alan McManus in the first round. Hallett, who was seventh in the Snooker world rankings 1990/1991, was the highest-ranked player to progress through to the third round; only Hallett, Dean Reynolds and Neal Foulds from the top 16 in the rankings progressed into the last-16 round.

Both losing semi-finalists were in their debut season as professional players. Jason Whittaker, who at 18 was the youngest professional player at the time, was eliminated by Morgan. McManus, the other losing semi-finalist, had progressed after requiring his opponents in both the last-16 and quarter-final to concede penalty points when only the final pink and black were left on the table.

Hallet won the first frame of the final, and led by 22 points in the next frame, but Morgan made a break of 53 and drew level. During the deciding frame, Hallett accidentally forced the final brown ball off the table; Morgan went on to win the frame 65–32 and take the title. After his victory, Morgan commented that "In a tournament like this, there is a lot of luck involved, and I had mine at exactly the right time."

== Prize fund ==
The winner of the event received £5,000 from a total prize fund of £40,000. The breakdown of prize money for the event is shown below.

- Winner: £5,000
- Runner-up: £3,000
- Semi-finalists: £2,000
- Quarter-finalists: £1,250
- Last 16: £750
- Last 32: £500
- Last 64: £250
- Highest break: £1,000

== Tournament draw ==
Match winners are shown in bold.
Note: w/d=withdrawn; w/o=walk-over

The following 12 players received byes from round-one into the last-64:

- Mark Bennett (WAL)
- Pascal Burke (IRL)
- Ray Edmonds (ENG)
- Dave Gilbert (ENG)
- Nigel Gilbert (ENG)
- Vic Harris (ENG)
- Tommy Murphy (NIR)
- Joe O'Boye (IRL)
- Jason Prince (NIR)
- Mark Rowing (ENG)
- Terry Whitthread (ENG)
- Gary Wilkinson (ENG)

=== Round one ===
==== Group one ====
- **Roger Bales** (ENG) **62**–50 Barry Pinches (ENG)
- **Jonathan Birch** (ENG) **77**–33 Rex Williams (ENG)
- **Ian Black** (SCO) **65**–21 Ian Graham (ENG)
- **Nigel Bond** (ENG) **61**–47 Jon Wright (ENG)
- **Paddy Browne** (IRL) **70**–26 Jim Chambers (ENG)
- **Ian Brumby** (ENG) **48**–47 Matt Gibson (SCO)
- **Andrew Cairns** (ENG) **60**–28 Derek Heaton (ENG)
- **Duncan Campbell** (SCO) **63**–24 Paul Medati (ENG)
- **Eddie Charlton** (AUS) **97**–4 Barry West (ENG)
- **Martin Clark** (ENG) **67**–43 Nick Terry (ENG)
- **Graham Cripsey** (ENG) **64**–22 John Rea (SCO)
- **Steve Davis** (ENG) **75**–0 Stephen Murphy (IRL)
- **Les Dodd** (ENG) **54**–24 Eugene Hughes (IRL)

==== Group two ====
- **Ken Doherty** (IRL) **86**–13 Bernard Bennett (ENG)
- **Jim Donnelly** (SCO) **w/o**–w/d John Spencer (ENG)
- **Tony Drago** (MLT) **108**–16 Martin Smith (ENG)
- **Steve Duggan** (ENG) **70**–53 Joe Johnson (ENG)
- **Nick Dyson** (ENG) **73**–48 John Campbell (AUS)
- **Craig Edwards** (ENG) **63**–33 Mark Wildman (ENG)
- **Jason Ferguson** (ENG) **68**–37 Steve James (ENG)
- **Jack Fitzmaurice** (ENG) **64**–54 Joe Grech (MLT)
- **Robby Foldvari** (AUS) **58**–37 Billy Kelly (IRL)
- **Neal Foulds** (ENG) **68**–1 George Scott (ENG)
- **Danny Fowler** (ENG) **62**–52 Steve Campbell (ENG)
- **Peter Francisco** (RSA) **65**–19 Tony Jones (ENG)
- **Marcel Gauvreau** (CAN) **w/o**–w/d James Wattana (THA)

==== Group three ====
- **Paul Gibson** (ENG) **63**–25 Steve Longworth (ENG)
- **David Greaves** (ENG) **w/o**–w/d Patsy Fagan (IRL)
- **Mike Hallett** (ENG) **115**–0 Terry Griffiths (WAL)
- **Dennis Hughes** (ENG) **w/o**–w/d Jimmy White (ENG)
- **Mark Johnston-Allen** (ENG) **74**–40 Warren King (AUS)
- **Wayne Jones** (WAL) **65**–43 Anthony Harris (ENG)
- **Tony Knowles** (ENG) **87**–30 Eddie Sinclair (SCO)
- **Rod Lawler** (ENG) **80**–33 Brian Morgan (ENG)
- **Murdo MacLeod** (SCO) **67**–43 Dennis Taylor (NIR)
- **Robert Marshall** (ENG) **71**–28 Graham Miles (ENG)
- **Alan McManus** (SCO) **60**–38 Stephen Hendry (SCO)
- **Steve Meakin** (ENG) **103**–17 Brady Gollan (CAN)
- **Darren Morgan** (WAL) **61**–35 John Dunning (ENG)

==== Group four ====
- **Steve Newbury** (WAL) **59**–52 Doug Mountjoy (WAL)
- **Dene O'Kane** (NZL) **73**–39 Silvino Francisco (RSA)
- **Bill Oliver** (ENG) **61**–27 Chris Cookson (ENG)
- **Ken Owers** (ENG) **w/o**–w/d Bob Harris (ENG)
- **Mick Price** (ENG) **81**–7 Tony Kearney (IRL)
- **Dean Reynolds** (ENG) **60**–25 Tony Meo (ENG)
- **David Roe** (ENG) **w/o**–w/d Gino Rigitano (CAN)
- **Colin Roscoe** (WAL) **92**–15 Cliff Wilson (WAL)
- **Brian Rowswell** (ENG) **w/o**–w/d Tony Chappel (WAL)
- **Cliff Thorburn** (CAN) **75**–5 David Taylor (ENG)
- **Willie Thorne** (ENG) **93**–13 Jack McLaughlin (NIR)
- **Jason Whittaker** (ENG) **69**–42 Jason Smith (ENG)
- **Tony Wilson** (IOM) **62**–58 Ian Williamson (ENG)

=== Last 64 ===
==== Group one ====
- **Nigel Bond** (ENG) **94**–0 Pascal Burke (IRL)
- **Paddy Browne** (IRL) **81**–61 Wayne Jones (WAL)
- **Ian Brumby** (ENG) **76**–15 Ian Black (SCO)
- **Andrew Cairns** (ENG) **61**–45 Jim Donnelly (SCO)
- **Duncan Campbell** (SCO) **81**–18 Ken Owers (ENG)
- **Eddie Charlton** (AUS) **100**–6 Jack Fitzmaurice (ENG)
- **Graham Cripsey** (ENG) **76**–51 Robby Foldvari (AUS)
- **Ken Doherty** (IRL) **73**–49 Jonathan Birch (ENG)
- **Steve Duggan** (ENG) **w/o**–w/d Bill Oliver (ENG)
- **Nick Dyson** (ENG) **64**–2 Rod Lawler (ENG)
- **Ray Edmonds** (ENG) **68**–18 Steve Davis (ENG)
- **Neal Foulds** (ENG) **78**–0 Dene O'Kane (NZL)
- **Peter Francisco** (RSA) **63**–60 Murdo MacLeod (SCO)
- **Marcel Gauvreau** (CAN) **60**–22 Brian Rowswell (ENG)
- **Paul Gibson** (ENG) **67**–25 Roger Bales (ENG)
- **Dave Gilbert** (ENG) **59**–40 Tommy Murphy (NIR)

==== Group two ====
- **Mike Hallett** (ENG) **77**–52 Gary Wilkinson (ENG)
- **Tony Knowles** (ENG) **120**–0 Martin Clark (ENG)
- **Alan McManus** (SCO) **w/o**–w/d Vic Harris (ENG)
- **Steve Meakin** (ENG) **60**–21 Nigel Gilbert (ENG)
- **Darren Morgan** (WAL) **60**–46 Willie Thorne (ENG)
- **Steve Newbury** (WAL) **70**–1 Danny Fowler (ENG)
- **Joe O'Boye** (IRL) **67**–32 David Greaves (ENG)
- **Mick Price** (ENG) **106**–1 Les Dodd (ENG)
- **Dean Reynolds** (ENG) **67**–47 Jason Prince (NIR)
- **David Roe** (ENG) **77**–9 Mark Johnston-Allen (ENG)
- **Colin Roscoe** (WAL) **72**–40 Mark Bennett (WAL)
- **Mark Rowing** (ENG) **84**–24 Robert Marshall (ENG)
- **Cliff Thorburn** (CAN) **58**–9 Tony Drago (MLT)
- **Jason Whittaker** (ENG) **78**–12 Dennis Hughes (ENG)
- **Terry Whitthread** (ENG) **65**–32 Craig Edwards (ENG)
- **Tony Wilson** (IOM) **96**–13 Jason Ferguson (ENG)

=== Last 32 ===
- **Ian Brumby** (ENG) **60**–9 Steve Meakin (ENG)
- **Graham Cripsey** (ENG) **64**–30 Peter Francisco (RSA)
- **Ken Doherty** (IRL) **66**–32 Ray Edmonds (ENG)
- **Nick Dyson** (ENG) **86**–11 Duncan Campbell (SCO)
- **Neal Foulds** (ENG) **74**–27 Mark Rowing (ENG)
- **Marcel Gauvreau** (CAN) **77**–16 Colin Roscoe (WAL)
- **Paul Gibson** (ENG) **62**–50 Paddy Browne (IRL)
- **Mike Hallett** (ENG) **79**–34 Terry Whitthread (ENG)
- **Tony Knowles** (ENG) **76**–64 Cliff Thorburn (CAN)
- **Alan McManus** (SCO) **71**–69 Tony Wilson (IOM)
- **Darren Morgan** (WAL) **74**–38 Andrew Cairns (ENG)
- **Steve Newbury** (WAL) **67**–36 Nigel Bond (ENG)
- **Joe O'Boye** (IRL) **79**–4 Eddie Charlton (AUS)
- **Dean Reynolds** (ENG) **69**–42 Mick Price (ENG)
- **David Roe** (ENG) **62**–52 Steve Duggan (ENG)
- **Jason Whittaker** (ENG) **63**–25 Dave Gilbert (ENG)

=== Last 16 ===
- **Ian Brumby** (ENG) **72**–17 Neal Foulds (ENG)
- **Graham Cripsey** (ENG) **68**–47 Marcel Gauvreau (CAN)
- **Mike Hallett** (ENG) **68**–46 Ken Doherty (IRL)
- **Tony Knowles** (ENG) **66**–16 Dean Reynolds (ENG)
- **Alan McManus** (SCO) **62**–38 Joe O'Boye (IRL)
- **Darren Morgan** (WAL) **68**–9 Steve Newbury (WAL)
- **David Roe** (ENG) **77**–43 Nick Dyson (ENG)
- **Jason Whittaker** (ENG) **56**–14 Paul Gibson (ENG)

=== Quarter-finals ===
- **Mike Hallett** (ENG) **50**–37 Tony Knowles (ENG)
- **Alan McManus** (SCO) **66**–62 Graham Cripsey (ENG)
- **Darren Morgan** (WAL) **78**–2 David Roe (ENG)
- **Jason Whittaker** (ENG) **69**–29 Ian Brumby (ENG)

=== Semi-finals ===
- **Mike Hallett** (ENG) **66**–21 Alan McManus (SCO)
- **Darren Morgan** (WAL) **77**–14 Jason Whittaker (ENG)

=== Final ===
Final: Best of 3 frames Trentham Gardens, Stoke-on-Trent, England, 28 September 1990
**Darren Morgan**; Wales	**2**–1	Mike Hallett; England
28–**97**, **72**–35 (**53**), **65**–32

== Century breaks ==
Only one century break was made during the tournament. The second-highest break was 93, compiled by Willie Thorne.

- 120 – Tony Knowles
