= 1986 Classic (snooker) =

Tournament information
- Dates: 3–12 January 1986
- Venue: Spectrum Arena
- City: Warrington
- Country: England
- Organisation: WPBSA
- Format: Ranking event
- Total prize fund: £225,000
- Winner's share: £45,000
- Highest break: Jimmy White (ENG) (117x2)

Final
- Champion: Jimmy White (ENG)
- Runner-up: Cliff Thorburn (CAN)
- Score: 13–12

The 1986 Mercantile Credit Classic was the seventh edition of the professional snooker tournament. The tournament was played at the Spectrum Arena, Warrington, Cheshire, and was televised on ITV from the last 16 round which started on 3 January 1986.

The earlier rounds (Pre last 16) were played between 8–13 November 1985. Defending champion Willie Thorne lost at the last-64 stage to Tony Jones 3–5.

Cliff Thorburn beat Doug Mountjoy 9–6 in the first semi-final. Thorburn led 5–2 after the first session and then 7–3 before Mountjoy won two frames in a row. Thorburn won the match in the 15th frame with a break of 72. Jimmy White beat Rex Williams 9–7 in the second semi-final, Williams having led 6–5.

Jimmy White won his first ranking event beating Cliff Thorburn 13–12 in the final, winning on the final black ball. White had been 7–8 behind at the end of the first day's play in the final, including a one frame penalty for arriving two minutes late for the start of the Saturday evening session.

The tournament had a prize fund of £225,000, with the winner receiving £45,000. The final attracted an average of 9.4 million viewers on ITV, peaking at 14.3 million.

== Main draw ==
Results are shown below.

Last 16; Best of 9 frames
Bill Werbeniuk (CAN)	3
15	Doug Mountjoy (WAL)	5
Neal Foulds (ENG)	5
John Campbell (AUS)	1
Eugene Hughes (IRL)	1
16	Joe Johnson (ENG)	5
11	Tony Meo (ENG)	1
4	Cliff Thorburn (CAN)	5
3	Steve Davis (ENG)	5
Peter Francisco (RSA)	0
Marcel Gauvreau (CAN)	2
8	Jimmy White (ENG)	5
5	Tony Knowles (ENG)	2
Rex Williams (ENG)	5
10	Alex Higgins (NIR)	5
2	Dennis Taylor (NIR)	4

Quarter-finals; Best of 9 frames
15	(Wales) Doug Mountjoy	5
(England) Neal Foulds	3
16	(England) Joe Johnson	4
4	(Canada) Cliff Thorburn	5
3	(England) Steve Davis	2
8	(England) Jimmy White	5
(England) Rex Williams	5
10	(Northern Ireland) Alex Higgins	2

Semi-finals; Best of 17 frames
15	(Wales) Doug Mountjoy	6
4	(Canada) Cliff Thorburn	9
8	(England) Jimmy White	9
(England) Rex Williams	7

Final; Best of 25 frames
4	(Canada) Cliff Thorburn	12
8	(England) Jimmy White	13

=== Final ===
Final: Best of 25 frames.. Spectrum Arena, Warrington, England, 11 & 12 January 1986.
Jimmy White; England	13–12	Cliff Thorburn; Canada
First session: 78–44, 107–24 (67), 70–52 (Thorburn 52), 62–43, 23–59, 39–67, 18–63 (54); Second session: 0–1 (forfeit), 8–72, 44–66, 84–8 (69), 18–111 (107), 0–80 (60), 71–11, 71–16 (63); Third session: 22–97 (87), 80–14 (56), 82–19, 75–30, 117–14 (117), 59–64 (White 53), 47–54, 70–58, 41–70, 57–55
117	Highest break	107
1	Century breaks	1
6	50+ breaks	5

== Qualifying ==
Qualifying took place in November 1985. The leading 32 players started at the last 64 stage. Results are shown below.

Last 64; Best of 9 frames
Willie Thorne (ENG)	3
Tony Jones (ENG)	5
Bill Werbeniuk (CAN)	5
Geoff Foulds (ENG)	3
Doug Mountjoy (WAL)	5
Warren King (AUS)	4
Dene O'Kane (NZL)	5
Paul Medati (ENG)	0
Silvino Francisco (RSA)	4
Stephen Hendry (SCO)	5
Neal Foulds (ENG)	5
Malcolm Bradley (ENG)	3
Ray Reardon (WAL)	3
Bernie Mikkelsen (CAN)	5
John Campbell (AUS)	5
Jim Donnelly (SCO)	2
Kirk Stevens (CAN)	2
Fred Davis (ENG)	5
Eugene Hughes (IRL)	5
Jim Wych (CAN)	2
Joe Johnson (ENG)	5
Bob Harris (ENG)	4
Perrie Mans (RSA)	5
Martin Smith (ENG)	4
Tony Meo (ENG)	5
Joe O'Boye (NIR)	3
Mark Wildman (ENG)	2
Barry West (ENG)	5
Cliff Thorburn (CAN)	5
Jack McLaughlin (NIR)	1
Mike Hallett (ENG)	5
John Rea (SCO)	2

Last 32; Best of 9 frames
(England) Tony Jones	3
(Canada) Bill Werbeniuk	5
(Wales) Doug Mountjoy	5
(New Zealand) Dene O'Kane	3
(Scotland) Stephen Hendry	4
(England) Neal Foulds	5
(Canada) Bernie Mikkelsen	2
(Australia) John Campbell	5
(England) Fred Davis	3
(Republic of Ireland) Eugene Hughes	5
(England) Joe Johnson	5
(South Africa) Perrie Mans	2
(England) Tony Meo	5
(England) Barry West	1
(Canada) Cliff Thorburn	5
(England) Mike Hallett	3

Last 64; Best of 9 frames
Steve Davis (ENG)	5
Bob Chaperon (CAN)	1
John Parrott (ENG)	3
Jimmy van Rensberg (RSA)	5
Eddie Charlton (AUS)	1
Peter Francisco (RSA)	5
Dave Martin (ENG)	5
Tommy Murphy (NIR)	0
David Taylor (ENG)	3
Marcel Gauvreau (CAN)	5
Cliff Wilson (WAL)	3
Paddy Browne (IRL)	5
Jimmy White (ENG)	5
Danny Fowler (ENG)	1
John Virgo (ENG)	5
Matt Gibson (SCO)	3
Tony Knowles (ENG)	5
Gino Rigitano (CAN)	4
Murdo MacLeod (SCO)	5
Eddie Sinclair (SCO)	2
Terry Griffiths (WAL)	3
Vic Harris (ENG)	5
Rex Williams (ENG)	5
Mike Watterson (ENG)	0
Alex Higgins (NIR)	5
Mick Fisher (ENG)	0
John Spencer (ENG)	1
Graham Cripsey (ENG)	5
Dennis Taylor (NIR)	5
Jack Fitzmaurice (ENG)	1
Dean Reynolds (ENG)	5
Pat Houlihan (ENG)	1

Last 32; Best of 9 frames
(England) Steve Davis	5
(South Africa) Jimmy van Rensberg	1
(South Africa) Peter Francisco	5
(England) Dave Martin	2
(Canada) Marcel Gauvreau	5
(Republic of Ireland) Paddy Browne	3
(England) Jimmy White	5
(England) John Virgo	2
(England) Tony Knowles	5
(Scotland) Murdo MacLeod	4
(England) Vic Harris	1
(England) Rex Williams	5
(Northern Ireland) Alex Higgins	5
(England) Graham Cripsey	2
(Northern Ireland) Dennis Taylor	5
(England) Dean Reynolds	4

== Century breaks ==
A total of nine century breaks were made during the event. White received £1,125 for making the highest break of the pre-televised stage, 135.

- 135, 117, 117 – Jimmy White
- 109, 107, 103 – Doug Mountjoy
- 107 – Cliff Thorburn
- 102 – Neal Foulds
- 101 – Martin Smith
