= 1988 British Open =

Tournament information
- Dates: 21 February – 6 March 1988
- Venue: Assembly Rooms
- City: Derby
- Country: England
- Organisation: WPBSA
- Format: Ranking event
- Total prize fund: £300,000
- Winner's share: £60,000
- Highest break: Stephen Hendry (SCO) (118)

Final
- Champion: Stephen Hendry (SCO)
- Runner-up: Mike Hallett (ENG)
- Score: 13–2

The 1988 British Open was a professional ranking snooker tournament, that was held from 21 February to 6 March 1988 with television coverage beginning on 26 February at the Assembly Rooms in Derby, England.

== Main draw ==
Last 64; Best of 9 frames
(England) Jimmy White	5
(England) Martin Clark	2
(Australia) Eddie Charlton	2
(England) Steve James	5
(South Africa) Silvino Francisco	5
(Canada) Jim Bear	0
(England) Tony Meo	2
(England) Gary Wilkinson	5
(Wales) Terry Griffiths	5
(Canada) Mario Morra	1
(Scotland) Stephen Hendry	5
(Wales) Tony Chappel	1
(Northern Ireland) Alex Higgins	3
(England) Tony Jones	5
(Canada) Kirk Stevens	w/d
(Canada) Bob Chaperon	w/o
(Canada) Cliff Thorburn	5
(Wales) Steve Newbury	2
(England) David Taylor	4
(England) Paul Medati	5
(England) Willie Thorne	5
(Canada) Jim Wych	1
(Wales) Cliff Wilson	5
(Wales) Colin Roscoe	2
(England) Rex Williams	5
(England) Nigel Gilbert	2
(England) Barry West	5
(England) John Dunning	0
(Northern Ireland) Dennis Taylor	5
(England) Graham Miles	1
(England) John Spencer	5
(England) Fred Davis	0
(England) Neal Foulds	5
(England) Danny Fowler	3
(South Africa) Peter Francisco	5
(England) Mike Darrington	1
(England) John Parrott	5
(Australia) Robby Foldvari	1
(England) John Virgo	5
(Northern Ireland) Tommy Murphy	1
(England) Joe Johnson	5
(England) Eric Lawlor	1
(England) Steve Longworth	4
(England) Brian Rowswell	5
(Wales) Doug Mountjoy	3
(New Zealand) Dene O'Kane	5
(England) Dave Martin	4
(Republic of Ireland) Paddy Browne	5
(England) Mike Hallett	5
(England) Ian Williamson	0
(Republic of Ireland) Eugene Hughes	3
(England) Graham Cripsey	5
(England) Tony Knowles	5
(Scotland) Matt Gibson	4
(Scotland) Murdo MacLeod	5
(England) David Gilbert	4
(Australia) John Campbell	5
(Wales) Wayne Jones	3
(England) Dean Reynolds	2
(Northern Ireland) Joe O'Boye	5
(England) Steve Davis	0
(Wales) Ray Reardon	5
(Malta) Tony Drago	3
(England) David Roe	5

Last 32; Best of 9 frames
(England) Jimmy White	5
(England) Steve James	1
(South Africa) Silvino Francisco	3
(England) Gary Wilkinson	5
(Wales) Terry Griffiths	1
(Scotland) Stephen Hendry	5
(England) Tony Jones	5
(Canada) Bob Chaperon	4
(Canada) Cliff Thorburn	5
(England) Paul Medati	2
(England) Willie Thorne	5
(Wales) Cliff Wilson	3
(England) Rex Williams	5
(England) Barry West	0
(Northern Ireland) Dennis Taylor	0
(England) John Spencer	5
(England) Neal Foulds	5
(South Africa) Peter Francisco	3
(England) John Parrott	5
(England) John Virgo	1
(England) Joe Johnson	5
(England) Brian Rowswell	2
(New Zealand) Dene O'Kane	5
(Republic of Ireland) Paddy Browne	2
(England) Mike Hallett	5
(England) Graham Cripsey	2
(England) Tony Knowles	4
(Scotland) Murdo MacLeod	5
(Australia) John Campbell	1
(Northern Ireland) Joe O'Boye	5
(Wales) Ray Reardon	2
(England) David Roe	5

Last 16; Best of 9 frames
(England) Jimmy White	5
(England) Gary Wilkinson	1
(Scotland) Stephen Hendry	5
(England) Tony Jones	3
(Canada) Cliff Thorburn	5
(England) Willie Thorne	2
(England) Rex Williams	5
(England) John Spencer	4
(England) Neal Foulds	0
(England) John Parrott	5
(England) Joe Johnson	2
(New Zealand) Dene O'Kane	5
(England) Mike Hallett	5
(Scotland) Murdo MacLeod	2
(Northern Ireland) Joe O'Boye	5
(England) David Roe	1

Quarter-finals; Best of 9 frames
(England) Jimmy White	4
(Scotland) Stephen Hendry	5
(Canada) Cliff Thorburn	5
(England) Rex Williams	2
(England) John Parrott	5
(New Zealand) Dene O'Kane	2
(England) Mike Hallett	5
(Northern Ireland) Joe O'Boye	4

Semi-finals; Best of 17 frames
(Scotland) Stephen Hendry	9
(Canada) Cliff Thorburn	5
(England) John Parrott	8
(England) Mike Hallett	9

Final; Best of 25 frames
(Scotland) Stephen Hendry	13
(England) Mike Hallett	2

== Final ==
Final: Best of 25 frames. Referee: Len Ganley; Assembly Rooms, Derby, England. 5 and 6 March 1988.
Stephen Hendry; Scotland	13–2	Mike Hallett; England
Afternoon: 91–18, 72–11, 65–20, 37–90, 80–21 (70), 79–30 (78), 81–49; Evening: 64–38, 80–6 (75), 98–15 (67), 93–10 (51), 76–8, 30–66, 89–16; Afternoon: 78–17
78	Highest break	40
0	Century breaks	0
5	50+ breaks	0
