= 1986 UK Championship =

1986 Tennent's UK Championship
Tournament information
- Dates: 22–30 November 1986
- Venue: Preston Guild Hall
- City: Preston
- Country: England
- Organisation: WPBSA
- Format: Ranking event
- Total prize fund: £300,000
- Winner's share: £60,000
- Highest break: Jimmy White (ENG) (144)

Final
- Champion: Steve Davis (ENG)
- Runner-up: Neal Foulds (ENG)
- Score: 16–7

The 1986 UK Championship (officially the 1986 Tennent's UK Championship) was a professional ranking snooker tournament that took place between 22 and 30 November 1986 at the Guild Hall in Preston, England. Scottish brewing company Tennent's took over as sponsors of the UK Championship when Coral withdrew their sponsorship after eight years.

Steve Davis won his fifth UK title by defeating Neal Foulds 16–7 in the final; Foulds had won the International Open two months earlier. Winning the top prize of £60,000, Davis achieved a personal landmark with his victory as it took his career winnings above £1 million. The highest break of the tournament was a 144 made by Jimmy White.

The event is more remembered for Alex Higgins headbutting the Tournament Director Paul Hatherell following his last 16 victory against Mike Hallett. The incident threatening him to be removed from the tournament but he stayed and after defeating Wayne Jones in the quarter finals, he lost 3–9 to Steve Davis in the semi-final. Higgins was later fined £12,000 and banned from five subsequent tournaments.

== Main draw ==
Last 64; Best of 17 frames
(England) Steve Davis | 9
(Wales) Tony Chappel | 7
(Australia) Eddie Charlton | 9
(England) Vic Harris | 2
(South Africa) Silvino Francisco | 9
(England) Ken Owers | 3
(England) Dean Reynolds | 9
(Canada) Bernie Mikkelsen | 6
(Malta) Tony Drago | 9
(England) Rex Williams | 7
(England) John Virgo | 9
(England) Graham Miles | 7
(England) Willie Thorne | 9
(Northern Ireland) Tommy Murphy | 4
(South Africa) Robbie Grace | 9
(Scotland) Murdo MacLeod | 6
(Northern Ireland) Alex Higgins | 9
(Scotland) Stephen Hendry | 8
(England) Dave Martin | 9
(England) Ian Williamson | 5
(England) Tony Meo | 9
(Northern Ireland) Joe O'Boye | 8
(England) Mike Hallett | 9
(Australia) Warren King | 5
(Wales) Ray Reardon | 9
(Scotland) Matt Gibson | 6
(Republic of Ireland) Eugene Hughes | 9
(Wales) Colin Roscoe | 8
(Northern Ireland) Dennis Taylor | 9
(England) David Roe | 5
(Wales) Wayne Jones | 9
(Australia) John Campbell | 3
(Canada) Cliff Thorburn | 9
(England) Danny Fowler | 7
(England) David Taylor | 9
(Canada) Bob Chaperon | 8
(Canada) Kirk Stevens | 9
(England) George Scott | 2
(England) John Spencer | 9
(Wales) Cliff Wilson | 5
(England) Neal Foulds | 9
(England) Graham Cripsey | 7
(Canada) Jim Wych | 9
(England) Bob Harris | 6
(England) Jimmy White | 9
(England) Ray Edmonds | 4
(South Africa) Peter Francisco | 9
(England) Mike Watterson | 4
(England) Tony Knowles | 9
(Scotland) John Rea | 4
(England) Tony Jones | 9
(England) Barry West | 4
(Wales) Terry Griffiths | 9
(England) Paul Gibson | 3
(New Zealand) Dene O'Kane | 9
(Canada) Bill Werbeniuk | 5
(Wales) Doug Mountjoy | 9
(Northern Ireland) Jack McLaughlin | 6
(England) Steve Longworth | 9
(England) Brian Rowswell | 3
(England) Joe Johnson | 9
(England) Jon Wright | 1
(England) John Parrott | 9
(England) Malcolm Bradley | 4

Last 32; Best of 17 frames
(England) Steve Davis | 9
(Australia) Eddie Charlton | 6
(South Africa) Silvino Francisco | 8
(England) Dean Reynolds | 9
(Malta) Tony Drago | 9
(England) John Virgo | 6
(England) Willie Thorne | 9
(South Africa) Robbie Grace | 1
(Northern Ireland) Alex Higgins | 9
(England) Dave Martin | 6
(England) Tony Meo | 4
(England) Mike Hallett | 9
(Wales) Ray Reardon | 5
(Republic of Ireland) Eugene Hughes | 9
(Northern Ireland) Dennis Taylor | 2
(Wales) Wayne Jones | 9
(Canada) Cliff Thorburn | 9
(England) David Taylor | 4
(Canada) Kirk Stevens | 4
(England) John Spencer | 9
(England) Neal Foulds | 9
(Canada) Jim Wych | 3
(England) Jimmy White | 9
(South Africa) Peter Francisco | 5
(England) Tony Knowles | 9
(England) Tony Jones | 5
(Wales) Terry Griffiths | 9
(New Zealand) Dene O'Kane | 0
(Wales) Doug Mountjoy | 1
(England) Steve Longworth | 9
(England) Joe Johnson | 1
(England) John Parrott | 9

Last 16; Best of 17 frames
(England) Steve Davis | 9
(England) Dean Reynolds | 5
(Malta) Tony Drago | 9
(England) Willie Thorne | 5
(Northern Ireland) Alex Higgins | 9
(England) Mike Hallett | 7
(Republic of Ireland) Eugene Hughes | 5
(Wales) Wayne Jones | 9
(Canada) Cliff Thorburn | 9
(England) John Spencer | 2
(England) Neal Foulds | 9
(England) Jimmy White | 7
(England) Tony Knowles | 9
(Wales) Terry Griffiths | 6
(England) Steve Longworth | 6
(England) John Parrott | 9

Quarter-finals; Best of 17 frames
(England) Steve Davis | 9
(Malta) Tony Drago | 8
(Northern Ireland) Alex Higgins | 9
(Wales) Wayne Jones | 5
(Canada) Cliff Thorburn | 2
(England) Neal Foulds | 9
(England) Tony Knowles | 4
(England) John Parrott | 9

Semi-finals; Best of 17 frames
(England) Steve Davis | 9
(Northern Ireland) Alex Higgins | 3
(England) Neal Foulds | 9
(England) John Parrott | 3

Final; Best of 31 frames
(England) Steve Davis | 16
(England) Neal Foulds | 7

== Final ==
Final: Best of 31 frames. Referee: John Street; The Guild Hall, Preston, England, 29 and 30 November 1986.
| Steve Davis; England | 16–7 | Neal Foulds; England |
First session: 20–64 (63), 39–90 (53), 62–19, 79–39, 79–15, 71–59, 53–57; Second session: 104–0 (104), 9–63, 53–43, 82–20 (61), 80–1 (80), 96–38 (65), 123–0 (56, 67); Third session: 18–80 (67), 78–70 (Foulds 56), 110–0 (110), 24–81, 65–28, 76–45 (59), 56–75; Fourth session: 124–0 (124), 75–0 (66)
| 124 | Highest break | 67 |
| 3 | Century breaks | 0 |
| 10 | 50+ breaks | 4 |

== Century breaks ==
- 144, 125 – Jimmy White
- 141, 125 – Willie Thorne
- 141, 103 – Tony Drago
- 140, 136, 124, 123, 123, 114 – Neal Foulds
- 137, 136, 128 – John Parrott
- 132 – Terry Griffiths
- 131 – Graham Cripsey
- 129, 125, 119, 109 – Cliff Thorburn
- 124, 118, 110, 110, 104 – Steve Davis
- 124 – David Taylor
- 123 – Gino Rigitano
- 123 – Jon Wright
- 120 – Mike Hallett
- 117 – Dennis Taylor
- 112 – Jim Donnelly
- 112 – Tony Jones
- 110, 106 – Joe Johnson
- 110, 103 – Bob Harris
- 110 – Kirk Stevens
- 107 – Dean Reynolds
- 106 – Wayne Jones
- 104 – Steve Newbury
- 103 – Paul Watchorn
- 102 – Dene O'Kane
- 101 – John Virgo
