= 1987 UK Championship =

1987 Tennent's UK Championship
Tournament information
- Dates: 13–29 November 1987
- Venue: Preston Guild Hall
- City: Preston
- Country: England
- Organisation: WPBSA
- Format: Ranking event
- Total prize fund: £350,000
- Winner's share: £70,000
- Highest break: Willie Thorne (ENG) (147)

Final
- Champion: Steve Davis (ENG)
- Runner-up: Jimmy White (ENG)
- Score: 16–14

The 1987 UK Championship (officially the 1987 Tennent's UK Championship) was a professional ranking snooker tournament that took place at the Guild Hall in Preston, England. The event started on 13 November 1987 and the televised stages were shown on BBC between 21 and 29 November 1987.

Willie Thorne made UK Championship history, when he became the first player to make a maximum break at the tournament against Tommy Murphy, although it was not televised, as it took place on 17 November.

Steve Davis meanwhile won his sixth and last UK title by defeating Jimmy White 16–14 in a classic match.

== Main draw ==
Last 64; Best of 17 frames
(England) Steve Davis	9
(Australia) Warren King	2
(South Africa) Peter Francisco	9
(England) Eric Lawlor	4
(Northern Ireland) Alex Higgins	9
(England) Steve Duggan	4
(England) David Taylor	9
(Canada) Bob Chaperon	6
(England) John Parrott	9
(Wales) Steve Newbury	5
(Canada) Jim Wych	9
(Scotland) Stephen Hendry	7
(England) Tony Knowles	9
(Scotland) John Rea	6
(Canada) Kirk Stevens	9
(Northern Ireland) Joe O'Boye	8
(Northern Ireland) Dennis Taylor	9
(England) Les Dodd	8
(New Zealand) Dene O'Kane	9
(Australia) Eddie Charlton	8
(England) Willie Thorne	9
(England) Bill Oliver	3
(Northern Ireland) Tommy Murphy	9
(Malta) Tony Drago	7
(England) Martin Smith	9
(Wales) Doug Mountjoy	6
(Australia) John Campbell	9
(England) Jim Chambers	7
(Canada) Cliff Thorburn	9
(England) Graham Cripsey	6
(England) John Virgo	9
(England) Fred Davis	4
(England) Danny Fowler	9
(England) Neal Foulds	5
(England) Graham Miles	9
(England) John Spencer	5
(England) Mike Hallett	9
(England) Tony Jones	2
(England) Tony Meo	9
(Republic of Ireland) Paul Watchorn	1
(Wales) Tony Chappel	9
(England) Dean Reynolds	5
(England) Steve Longworth	9
(Canada) Bill Werbeniuk	5
(England) Joe Johnson	9
(Canada) Jim Bear	5
(England) Barry West	9
(Canada) Marcel Gauvreau	6
(Wales) Terry Griffiths	9
(England) Gary Wilkinson	5
(England) Ray Edmonds	9
(Scotland) Murdo MacLeod	4
(South Africa) Silvino Francisco	9
(Wales) Ray Reardon	3
(Wales) Cliff Wilson	9
(Wales) Wayne Jones	5
(England) David Roe	9
(England) Rex Williams	7
(England) Vic Harris	9
(England) Dave Martin	7
(England) Jimmy White	9
(England) John Dunning	0
(Republic of Ireland) Eugene Hughes	9
(England) Nigel Gilbert	7

Last 32; Best of 17 frames
(England) Steve Davis	9
(South Africa) Peter Francisco	6
(Northern Ireland) Alex Higgins	9
(England) David Taylor	6
(England) John Parrott	9
(Canada) Jim Wych	6
(England) Tony Knowles	9
(Canada) Kirk Stevens	8
(Northern Ireland) Dennis Taylor	7
(New Zealand) Dene O'Kane	9
(England) Willie Thorne	9
(Northern Ireland) Tommy Murphy	4
(England) Martin Smith	8
(Australia) John Campbell	9
(Canada) Cliff Thorburn	9
(England) John Virgo	6
(England) Danny Fowler	9
(England) Graham Miles	4
(England) Mike Hallett	9
(England) Tony Meo	5
(Wales) Tony Chappel	9
(England) Steve Longworth	6
(England) Joe Johnson	9
(England) Barry West	6
(Wales) Terry Griffiths	9
(England) Ray Edmonds	5
(South Africa) Silvino Francisco	9
(Wales) Cliff Wilson	1
(England) David Roe	9
(England) Vic Harris	5
(England) Jimmy White	9
(Republic of Ireland) Eugene Hughes	4

Last 16; Best of 17 frames
(England) Steve Davis	9
(Northern Ireland) Alex Higgins	2
(England) John Parrott	9
(England) Tony Knowles	4
(New Zealand) Dene O'Kane	7
(England) Willie Thorne	9
(Australia) John Campbell	4
(Canada) Cliff Thorburn	9
(England) Danny Fowler	4
(England) Mike Hallett	9
(Wales) Tony Chappel	4
(England) Joe Johnson	9
(Wales) Terry Griffiths	9
(South Africa) Silvino Francisco	3
(England) David Roe	5
(England) Jimmy White	9

Quarter-finals; Best of 17 frames
(England) Steve Davis	9
(England) John Parrott	5
(England) Willie Thorne	9
(Canada) Cliff Thorburn	8
(England) Mike Hallett	7
(England) Joe Johnson	9
(Wales) Terry Griffiths	7
(England) Jimmy White	9

Semi-finals; Best of 17 frames
(England) Steve Davis	9
(England) Willie Thorne	2
(England) Joe Johnson	4
(England) Jimmy White	9

Final; Best of 31 frames
(England) Steve Davis	16
(England) Jimmy White	14

== Final ==
Final: Best of 31 frames. Referee: John Williams; The Guild Hall, Preston, England, 28 and 29 November 1987.
Steve Davis; England	16–14	Jimmy White; England
First session: 112–20 (106), 9–91 (91), 56–77, 0–139 (139), 53–74 (58), 78–27 (55), 27–77; Second session: 67–53 (White 52), 84–14, 31–103, 107–13 (107), 98–0 (98), 5–107 (57, 50), 75–37 (75); Third session: 19–83, 16–67, 82–36, 81–44, 64–5, 73–0 (73), 16–75 (50); Fourth session: 8–68, 28–77 (70), 107–0 (100), 65–64 (White 58), 4–64, 111–3 (110), 16–63 (59), 121–0 (108), 59–42
110	Highest break	139
5	Century breaks	1
9	50+ breaks	10

== Century breaks ==
- 147, 122, 108, 107 – Willie Thorne
- 139 – Jimmy White
- 137, 100 – Tony Meo
- 134 – Joe Johnson
- 133, 107 – Cliff Thorburn
- 132 – John Campbell
- 127, 104 – Steve James
- 126 – Nigel Gilbert
- 110, 108, 107, 106, 100 – Steve Davis
- 110, 101, 101 – John Parrott
- 107 – Dene O'Kane
- 106 – Alex Higgins
- 105, 100 – Ray Edmonds
- 105 – Dennis Taylor
- 101 – Tony Chappel
- 100 – Graham Cripsey
