= 1989 International Open =

1989 BCE International Open
Tournament information
- Dates: 19–30 September 1989
- Venue: Trentham Gardens
- City: Stoke-on-Trent
- Country: England
- Organisation: WPBSA
- Format: Ranking event
- Winner's share: £40,000

Final
- Champion: Steve Davis (ENG)
- Runner-up: Stephen Hendry (SCO)
- Score: 9–4

The 1989 International Open (officially the 1989 BCE International Open) was a professional ranking snooker tournament that took place in September 1989 at Trentham Gardens in Stoke-on-Trent, England.

This year there was no television coverage after ITV pulled out due to the championship having lower ratings than the other three tournaments they were showing. This also caused the previous sponsor Fidelity Unit Trusts to pull out with BCE stepping in for this year. With no TV coverage and a lack of sponsorship this was the last International until 1993.

Steve Davis retained the title by defeating Stephen Hendry 9–4 in the final. It was the first ranking final they faced each other.

== Main draw ==
Last 64; Best of 9 frames
(England) Steve Davis	5
(Republic of Ireland) Tony Kearney	1
(Wales) Wayne Jones	5
(England) Pat Houlihan	2
(Wales) Mark Bennett	5
(England) Tony Meo	2
(England) Neal Foulds	5
(Northern Ireland) Joe O'Boye	0
(England) Brian Morgan	5
(England) Joe Johnson	2
(Republic of Ireland) Eugene Hughes	5
(Wales) Darren Morgan	0
(Northern Ireland) Dennis Taylor	5
(England) Nick Dyson	1
(England) Martin Clark	5
(Australia) Warren King	4
(Wales) Terry Griffiths	5
(Canada) Brady Gollan	4
(Wales) Steve Newbury	5
(England) Steve Duggan	2
(Canada) Alain Robidoux	5
(Wales) Doug Mountjoy	4
(England) Roger Bales	5
(England) David Roe	4
(England) Willie Thorne	5
(Northern Ireland) Tommy Murphy	2
(England) Barry West	w/o
(Canada) Jim Wych	w/d
(England) Jimmy White	5
(England) Jason Smith	3
(Canada) Bob Chaperon	5
(England) Ian Williamson	4
(Scotland) Stephen Hendry	5
(England) Ian Graham	0
(Thailand) James Wattana	5
(South Africa) Peter Francisco	0
(England) Tony Jones	5
(England) John Virgo	0
(England) Mark Johnston-Allen	5
(Northern Ireland) Alex Higgins	1
(England) Robert Marshall	5
(England) Dean Reynolds	3
(Australia) Eddie Charlton	5
(England) Ian Brumby	4
(England) Mike Hallett	5
(England) Les Dodd	4
(Wales) Cliff Wilson	5
(England) Jon Wright	2
(England) Nigel Bond	5
(Canada) Cliff Thorburn	4
(South Africa) Silvino Francisco	5
(Australia) John Campbell	4
(England) Steve James	5
(Northern Ireland) Jack McLaughlin	3
(England) Martin Smith	5
(England) Rex Williams	4
(England) Tony Knowles	5
(England) Bob Harris	1
(England) Andrew Cairns	5
(New Zealand) Dene O'Kane	2
(England) John Parrott	5
(England) Mick Fisher	2
(Malta) Tony Drago	5
(Scotland) Murdo MacLeod	4

Last 32; Best of 9 frames
(England) Steve Davis	5
(Wales) Wayne Jones	2
(Wales) Mark Bennett	2
(England) Neal Foulds	5
(England) Brian Morgan	5
(Republic of Ireland) Eugene Hughes	3
(Northern Ireland) Dennis Taylor	5
(England) Martin Clark	4
(Wales) Terry Griffiths	2
(Wales) Steve Newbury	5
(Canada) Alain Robidoux	5
(England) Roger Bales	1
(England) Willie Thorne	5
(England) Barry West	2
(England) Jimmy White	5
(Canada) Bob Chaperon	3
(Scotland) Stephen Hendry	5
(Thailand) James Wattana	3
(England) Tony Jones	5
(England) Mark Johnston-Allen	2
(England) Robert Marshall	5
(Australia) Eddie Charlton	2
(England) Mike Hallett	4
(Wales) Cliff Wilson	5
(England) Nigel Bond	5
(South Africa) Silvino Francisco	3
(England) Steve James	5
(England) Martin Smith	3
(Wales) Tony Knowles	5
(England) Andrew Cairns	2
(England) John Parrott	5
(Malta) Tony Drago	3

Last 16; Best of 9 frames
(England) Steve Davis	5
(England) Neal Foulds	3
(England) Brian Morgan	5
(Northern Ireland) Dennis Taylor	4
(Wales) Steve Newbury	2
(Canada) Alain Robidoux	5
(England) Willie Thorne	1
(England) Jimmy White	5
(Scotland) Stephen Hendry	5
(England) Tony Jones	4
(England) Robert Marshall	3
(Wales) Cliff Wilson	5
(England) Nigel Bond	5
(England) Steve James	0
(England) Tony Knowles	2
(England) John Parrott	5

Quarter-finals; Best of 9 frames
(England) Steve Davis	5
(England) Brian Morgan	2
(Canada) Alain Robidoux	5
(England) Jimmy White	4
(Scotland) Stephen Hendry	5
(Wales) Cliff Wilson	2
(England) Nigel Bond	5
(England) John Parrott	2

Semi-finals; Best of 11 frames
(England) Steve Davis	6
(Canada) Alain Robidoux	3
(Scotland) Stephen Hendry	6
(England) Nigel Bond	5

Final; Best of 17 frames
(England) Steve Davis	9
(Scotland) Stephen Hendry	4
