= Pontins Open =

Tournament information
- Venue: Pontins
- Location: Prestatyn
- Country: Wales
- Established: 1974
- Format: Pro–am event
- Final year: 2011

The Pontins Open events were a series of pro–am snooker tournaments which ran from 1974 until 2011.

== History ==
From the early 1970s, top professionals had supplemented their income entertaining and coaching holiday makers on the holiday camp circuit and at Pontin's in particular. That organisation organised several Snooker Festivals at which ordinary members of the public could join with top amateurs and the best professionals in open tournaments.

The first of these events was held in 1974 and eight top professionals were invited to take part in the Pontins Professional (which ended in 2000) while many others joined them in the Open event where up to 1000 hopefuls would set out with the chance to meet one of their idols in the later rounds. The most important of these festivals was the Pontins Spring Open held at Prestatyn, Wales. A similar Open event, the Pontins Autumn Open was held later in the year and attracted almost as many top names as the spring event.

The professionals had to concede up to 25 points per frame to the amateurs (this figure varied over the years) and this format meant that many of the star names fell to good amateurs. In the earlier years nearly all the top players took part but as the number of tour events increased very few entered in later years.

The Autumn Open ended in 2009 and the Spring Open ended in 2011 and the festival in later years also hosted the final Challenge Tour event where players battle for places on the main tour in the following season.

A later event which began in 2006, the Pontins World Pro-Am Series consisted of six qualifying events, open to amateurs and main tour professionals and was played in the summer and autumn. Points were awarded for each event with the best five results counting towards a merit table. The leading 64 players qualified to play in the series final. The series ran for four editions ending in 2009 and another pro-am tournament, the Pro Challenge Series, was held at the Prestatyn venue later that year instead.

== Finals ==
=== Pontins Spring Open ===
Year	Winner	Runner-up	Final score	Season
1974	Doug Mountjoy (WAL)	John Spencer (ENG)	7–4	1973/74
1975	Ray Reardon (WAL)	John Virgo (ENG)	7–1	1974/75
1976	Doug Mountjoy (WAL)	Lance Pibworth (ENG)	7–1	1975/76
1977	Alex Higgins (NIR)	Terry Griffiths (WAL)	7–4	1976/77
1978	Steve Davis (ENG)	Tony Meo (ENG)	7–6	1977/78
1979	Steve Davis (ENG)	Jimmy White (ENG)	7–3	1978/79
1980	Willie Thorne (ENG)	Cliff Wilson (WAL)	7–3	1979/80
1981	John Hargreaves (ENG)	Cliff Wilson (WAL)	7–2	1980/81
1982	John Parrott (ENG)	Ray Reardon (WAL)	7–4	1981/82
1983	Terry Griffiths (WAL)	Ray Reardon (WAL)	7–3	1982/83
1984	Neal Foulds (ENG)	Doug Mountjoy (WAL)	7–4	1983/84
1985	Jim Chambers (ENG)	John Parrott (ENG)	7–6	1984/85
1986	John Parrott (ENG)	Tony Putnam (ENG)	7–6	1985/86
1987	Stefan Mazrocis (ENG)	Barry Pinches (ENG)	7–2	1986/87
1988	Ken Doherty (IRL)	Colin Morton (ENG)	7–5	1987/88
1989	Peter Ebdon (ENG)	Ken Doherty (IRL)	7–4	1988/89
1990	Tony Rampello (ENG)	Paul Davies (WAL)	7–3	1989/90
1991	Mike Hallett (ENG)	Wayne Brown (ENG)	7–5	1990/91
1992	Declan Hughes (NIR)	Steve James (ENG)	7–2	1991/92
1993	Mike Hallett (ENG)	Steve James (ENG)	7–6	1992/93
1994	Wayne Brown (ENG)	Graeme Dott (SCO)	7–3	1993/94
1995	Mark Williams (WAL)	Peter Ebdon (ENG)	7–4	1994/95
1996	Ken Doherty (IRL)	Darren Morgan (WAL)	7–3	1995/96
1997	Ken Doherty (IRL)	Paul Bunyard (ENG)	7–6	1996/97
1998	James McGouran (SCO)	Neal Foulds (ENG)	7–0	1997/98
1999	John Gallagher (IRL)	Luke Simmonds (ENG)	7–4	1998/99
2000	Ian Preece (WAL)	Scott MacKenzie (SCO)	7–4	1999/00
2001	Luke Simmonds (ENG)	Brian Morgan (ENG)	7–5	2000/01
2002	Paul Sweeny (ENG)	Scott MacKenzie (SCO)	4–3	2001/02
2003	Judd Trump (ENG)	Mike Hallett (ENG)	4–2	2002/03
2004	Stuart Bingham (ENG)	Wayne Cooper (ENG)	5–3	2003/04
2005	Jamie Cope (ENG)	Mike Finn (ENG)	5–0	2004/05
2006	Stuart Bingham (ENG)	Tom Harris (ENG)	5–2	2005/06
2007	Leo Fernandez (IRL)	Daniel Wells (WAL)	5–2	2006/07
2008	David Grace (ENG)	Nigel Bond (ENG)	5–1	2007/08
2009	Stuart Bingham (ENG)	Matthew Couch (ENG)	5–1	2008/09
2010	Nigel Bond (ENG)	Stephen Craigie (ENG)	5–2	2009/10
2011	Leo Fernandez (IRL)	Sydney Wilson (ENG)	5–1	2010/11

=== Pontins Autumn Open ===
Year	Winner	Runner-up	Final score	Season
1976	Cliff Wilson (WAL)	Paul Medati (ENG)	7–4	1976/77
1977	Billy Kelly (IRE)	George Scott (ENG)	7–5	1977/78
1978	Jimmy White (ENG)	Sid Hood (ENG)	7–6	1978/79
1979	Tony Knowles (ENG)	Dave Martin (ENG)	7–0	1979/80
1980	Paul Medati (ENG)	Vic Harris (ENG)	7–4	1980/81
1981	Bill Oliver (ENG)	Ian Williamson (ENG)	7–5	1981/82
1982	Steve Duggan (ENG)	Kevin Lowndes (ENG)	7–3	1982/83
1983	Roger Bales (ENG)	Gary Filtness (ENG)	7–0	1983/84
1984	Barry West (ENG)	Gary Hancock (ENG)	7–3	1984/85
1985	Gary Bray (ENG)	Mark Johnston-Allen (ENG)	7–5	1985/86
1986	Tony Wilson (IOM)	Craig Edwards (ENG)	5–4	1986/87
1987	Nick Terry (ENG)	Mark Johnston-Allen (ENG)	5–4	1987/88
1988	Jason Ferguson (ENG)	Jonathan Birch (ENG)	5–2	1988/89
1989	Jonathan Birch (ENG)	Drew Henry (SCO)	5–4	1989/90
1990	Anthony Hamilton (ENG)	Joe Swail (NIR)	5–1	1990/91
1991	Drew Henry (SCO)	John Read (ENG)	5–2	1991/92
1992	Nick Walker (ENG)	Anthony Harris (ENG)	5–3	1992/93
1993	Peter Lines (ENG)	Andrew Hannah (ENG)	5–1	1993/94
1994	John Read (ENG)	Craig Edwards (ENG)	5–2	1994/95
1995	Graeme Dott (SCO)	Stephen Lee (ENG)	5–1	1995/96
1996	Matthew Couch (ENG)	Gary Ponting (ENG)	5–4	1996/97
1997	James McGouran (SCO)	Matthew Couch (ENG)	5–3	1997/98
1998	Matthew Couch (ENG)	Brian Salmon (ENG)	5–1	1998/99
1999	Craig Butler (ENG)	Matthew Farrant (WAL)	5–4	1999/00
2000	Kuldesh Johal (ENG)	Colin Morton (ENG)	5–3	2000/01
2001	Sean O'Neill (NIR)	Rodney Goggins (IRL)	5–1	2001/02
2002	Tim English (WAL)	Brendan O'Donoghue (IRL)	5–4	2002/03
2003	Mark King (ENG)	Craig Butler (ENG)	5–4	2003/04
2004	Stuart Bingham (ENG)	Mark Davis (ENG)	4–2	2004/05
2005	Joe Swail (NIR)	Dave Harold (ENG)	5–3	2005/06
2006	Ryan Day (WAL)	Jamie Cope (ENG)	5–2	2006/07
2007	Jamie Cope (ENG)	Lee Page (ENG)	5–0	2007/08
2008	Craig Steadman (ENG)	Leo Fernandez (IRL)	5–0	2008/09
2009	Michael Georgiou (CYP)	David Donovan (WAL)	5–2	2009/10
2010	Rob James (ENG)	Michael Holt (ENG)	5–4	2010/11

=== Pontins World Series ===
Year	Winner	Runner-up	Final score	Season
2006	Ken Doherty (IRL)	Ricky Walden (ENG)	4–2	2006/07
2007	Joe Perry (ENG)	Ricky Walden (ENG)	4–2	2007/08
2008	Jamie Cope (ENG)	Craig Steadman (ENG)	4–1	2008/09
2009	Stuart Bingham (ENG)	Ken Doherty (IRL)	3–1	2009/10

== See also ==
- Pontins Professional
- Pro Challenge Series
- International Open Series – another amateur-only tournament sponsored by Pontins
