= 1989 English Professional Championship =

English Professional Championship
Tournament information
- Dates: 12–18 February 1989
- Venue: Redwood Lodge
- City: Bristol
- Country: England
- Format: Non-ranking event
- Total prize fund: £15,500

Final
- Champion: Mike Hallett
- Runner-up: John Parrott
- Score: 9–7

The 1989 English Professional Championship was a professional non-ranking snooker tournament, which took place in February 1989 in Bristol, England. This was the final edition of the tournament.

Mike Hallett won the title by defeating John Parrott 9–7 in the final.

== Main draw ==
Last 32; Best of 9 frames
Mike Hallett	5
Pat Houlihan	2
Mick Price	5
David Taylor	1
Steve Longworth	5
Bob Marshall	3
Tony Knowles	5
Ian Williamson	2
Gary Wilkinson	5
John Virgo	3
Ian Graham	5
Rex Williams	5
Brian Rowswell	5
Dave Martin	2
Dean Reynolds	5
Anthony Harris	3
John Parrott	5
Graham Miles	3
Danny Fowler	5
Tony Meo	3
Joe Johnson	5
Dave Gilbert	2
Craig Edwards	5
John Spencer	1
Neal Foulds	5
Paul Medati	3
Graham Cripsey	5
Steve James	3
Willie Thorne	5
Martin Clark	1
David Roe	5
Barry West	4

Last 16; Best of 9 frames
Mike Hallett	5
Mick Price	4
Steve Longworth	5
Tony Knowles	4
Gary Wilkinson	5
Ian Graham	1
Brian Rowswell	5
Dean Reynolds	4
John Parrott	5
Danny Fowler	4
Joe Johnson	5
Craig Edwards	0
Neal Foulds	5
Graham Cripsey	1
Willie Thorne	5
David Roe	1

Quarter-final; Best of 9 frames
Mike Hallett	5
Steve Longworth	1
Gary Wilkinson	5
Brian Rowswell	1
John Parrott	5
Joe Johnson	4
Neal Foulds	5
Willie Thorne	3

Semi-final; Best of 9 frames
Mike Hallett	5
Gary Wilkinson	3
John Parrott	5
Neal Foulds	4

Final; Best of 17 frames
Mike Hallett	9
John Parrott	7
