= 1986 Clacton Professional =

Professional snooker tournament in England

Tournament information
- Dates: March 1986
- Venue: Princes Theatre
- City: Clacton
- Country: England
- Organisation: WPBSA
- Format: Non-Ranking event
- Total prize fund: £10,750
- Winner's share: £3,000
- Highest break: Mike Hallett (ENG), 134

Final
- Champion: Mike Hallett (ENG)
- Runner-up: Tony Jones (ENG)
- Score: 5–3

The 1986 Clacton Professional was a non-ranking professional snooker tournament held in Clacton in March 1986 for players outside the top 16 in the Snooker world rankings 1985/1986. Matches in the first three rounds took place at the Clacton Snooker Centre, owned by the event's promoters Mike Clarke and Peter Koniotes. The quarter-finals onwards were played at the Princes Theatre. The World Professional Billiards and Snooker Association contributed £5,000 to the total prize fund of £10,750.

Mike Hallett won the title by defeating Tony Jones 5–3 in the final. His break of 134 in the concluding frame was the highest of the tournament.

Bill Werbeniuk was the top seed among the 43 entrants, followed by Eugene Hughes, Dean Reynolds and Mark Wildman.

== Main draw ==
Results from the last 16 round onwards are shown below.

Third round
Bill Werbeniuk (CAN)	2
Wayne Jones (WAL)	4
Barry West (ENG)	4
Les Dodd (ENG)	2
Tony Jones (ENG)	4
Martin Smith (ENG)	0
Mark Wildman (ENG)	4
Tony Chappel (WAL)	2
Dean Reynolds (ENG)	4
Tommy Murphy (NIR)	2
Vic Harris (ENG)	4
Peter Francisco (RSA)	3
Marcel Gauvreau (CAN)	4
Bob Chaperon (CAN)	2
Eugene Hughes (IRE)	1
Mike Hallett (ENG)	4

Quarter-finals
Wayne Jones (WAL)	4
Barry West (ENG)	2
Tony Jones (ENG)	4
Mark Wildman (ENG)	0
Dean Reynolds (ENG)	4
Vic Harris (ENG)	3
Marcel Gauvreau (CAN)	2
Mike Hallett (ENG)	4

Semi-finals
Tony Jones (ENG)	5
Wayne Jones (WAL)	2
Dean Reynolds (ENG)	3
Mike Hallett (ENG)	5

Final
Tony Jones (ENG)	3
Mike Hallett (ENG)	5
