= 1987–88 snooker season =

Details
- Duration: 29 June 1987 – 15 May 1988
- Tournaments: 27 (6 ranking events)

Triple Crown winners
- UK Championship: (England) Steve Davis
- Masters: (England) Steve Davis
- World Championship: (England) Steve Davis

The 1987–88 snooker season was a series of snooker tournaments played between 29 June 1987 and 15 May 1988. The table below outlines the results for the ranking and invitational events.

Thirteen players earned more than £100,000 in prize money during the season. Steve Davis was the top earner, with £661,490, followed by John Parrott who won a total of £331,394. The top 16 players took £3.2m of the season's total of £4m prize money between them. There were 99 players who earnt less than £20,000, and 78 that earnt less than £10,000.

== New professional players ==
The World Professional Billiards and Snooker Association had introduced a play-off system to restrict the number of entries for professional tournaments, other than the World Championship, to 128. A total of ten amateurs, being the World Amateur Champion, the English Amateur Champion, and the eight players (excluding otherwise-qualified players) finishing highest in a play-off series, would be considered for professional status.

For 1987–88, six-play offs between those amateurs and the lowest-ranked professional would have been necessary to keep to the limit of 128. The English Amateur Championship winner Antony Harris accepted a place on the professional tour, but World Amateur champion Paul Mifsud declined. Existing professionals Bert Demarco, Mike Hines, Paddy Morgan, Bernard Bennett and James Giannaros, rather than participate in the play-offs, opted to accept "non-tournament" status, which would allow them to enter only the World Championship. This meant that Gary Wilkinson, Martin Clark, Jim Chambers, Derek Heaton, Robert Marshall and Eric Lawlor took their places on the tour. Maurice Parkin took non-tournament status after losing 1–10 to Steve Meakin in a play-off.

Changes in professional tour membership
New professionals for 1987–88	Moved to non-tournament status
Antony Harris; Gary Wilkinson; Martin Clark; Jim Chambers; Derek Heaton; Robert Marshall; Eric Lawlor; Steve Meakin	Bert Demarco; Mike Hines; Paddy Morgan; Bernard Bennett; James Giannaros; Maurice Parkin

== Calendar ==
Date (Note: Dates use the mm-dd date format.)			Rank	Tournament name	Venue	City	Winner	Runner-up	Score	Reference
06–29	07–08	AUS	NR	Australian Masters	Parmatta Club	Sydney	(Scotland) Stephen Hendry	(England) Mike Hallett	(Note: The final was decided on aggregate score over five frames. Stephen Hendry won 371–226.)	
07–13	07–19	AUS	NR	Australian Professional Championship	Lakemba Services Memorial Club	Sydney	(Australia) Warren King	(Australia) Eddie Charlton	10–7	
08–02	08-08	CAN	NR	Canadian Professional Championship	Scarborough Village Theatre	Toronto	(Canada) Cliff Thorburn	(Canada) Jim Bear	8–4	
08–28	08–31	JPN	NR	Tokyo Masters	Tokyo Prince Hotel	Tokyo	(Northern Ireland) Dennis Taylor	(Wales) Terry Griffiths	6–3	
09–02	09–06	HKG	NR	Hong Kong Masters	Queen Elizabeth Stadium	Hong Kong	(England) Steve Davis	(Scotland) Stephen Hendry	9–3	
09–14	09–16	IRL	NR	Carling Challenge	RTÉ Studios	Dublin	(Northern Ireland) Dennis Taylor	(England) Joe Johnson	8–5	
09–17	09–20	SCO	NR	Scottish Masters	Hospitality Inn	Glasgow	(England) Joe Johnson	(Wales) Terry Griffiths	9–7	
09–25	10–04	ENG	WR	International Open	Trentham Gardens	Stoke-on-Trent	(England) Steve Davis	(Canada) Cliff Thorburn	12–5	
10–17	10–25	ENG	WR	Grand Prix	Hexagon Theatre	Reading	(Scotland) Stephen Hendry	(Northern Ireland) Dennis Taylor	10–7	
10-27	10-31	CAN	NR	Canadian Masters	CBC Television Studios	Toronto	(Northern Ireland) Dennis Taylor	(England) Jimmy White	9–7	
11–04	11–07	ENG	NR	Matchroom Professional Championship	Cliffs Pavilion	Southend-on-Sea	(Northern Ireland) Dennis Taylor	(England) Willie Thorne	10–3	
11–13	11–29	ENG	WR	UK Championship	Guild Hall	Preston	(England) Steve Davis	(England) Jimmy White	16–14	
12–01	12–13	ENG	TE	World Doubles Championship	Derngate Centre	Northampton	(England) Mike Hallett (Scotland) Stephen Hendry	(Canada) Cliff Thorburn (Northern Ireland) Dennis Taylor	12–8	
01-01	01–10	ENG	WR	The Classic	Norbreck Castle Hotel	Blackpool	(England) Steve Davis	(England) John Parrott	13–11	
01-??	01-??	RSA	NR	South African Professional Championship		Germiston	(South Africa) Francois Ellis	(South Africa) Jimmy van Rensberg	9–4	
01–24	01–30	ENG	NR	The Masters	Wembley Conference Centre	London	(England) Steve Davis	(England) Mike Hallett	9–0	
02–04	02–10	ENG	NR	English Professional Championship	Corn Exchange	Ipswich	(England) Dean Reynolds	(England) Neal Foulds	9–5	
02–08	02–12	WAL	NR	Welsh Professional Championship	Newport Centre	Newport	(Wales) Terry Griffiths	(Wales) Wayne Jones	9–3	
02–09	02–12	NIR	NR	Irish Professional Championship	Antrim Forum	Antrim	(Northern Ireland) Jack McLaughlin	(Northern Ireland) Dennis Taylor	9–4	
02–11	02–14	SCO	NR	Scottish Professional Championship	Marco's Leisure Centre	Edinburgh	(Scotland) Stephen Hendry	(Scotland) Murdo MacLeod	10–4	
02–21	03–06	ENG	WR	British Open	Assembly Rooms	Derby	(Scotland) Stephen Hendry	(England) Mike Hallett	13–2	
03–16	03–19	ENG	TE	World Cup	Bournemouth International Centre	Bournemouth	England	Australia	9–7	
03–22	03–27	IRL	NR	Irish Masters	Goff's	Kill	(England) Steve Davis	(England) Neal Foulds	9–4	
04–06	04–09	CHN	NR	Kent Cup	Beijing Indoor Stadium	Beijing	(England) John Parrott	(England) Martin Clark	5–1	
04–16	05–02	ENG	WR	World Snooker Championship	Crucible Theatre	Sheffield	(England) Steve Davis	(Wales) Terry Griffiths	18–11	
05–07	05–14	WAL	NR	Pontins Professional	Pontins	Prestatyn	(England) John Parrott	(England) Mike Hallett	9–1	
01–23	05–15	EUR	NR	Matchroom League			(England) Steve Davis	(Scotland) Stephen Hendry	(Note: No play-off was held and the title was decided on league table only.)	

WR = World ranking event
NR = Non-ranking event

== Official rankings ==
The top 16 of the world rankings, these players automatically played in the final rounds of the world ranking events and were invited for the Masters.

No.	Ch.	Name
1	Steady	(England) Steve Davis
2	▲	(England) Jimmy White
3	▲	(England) Neal Foulds
4	▼	(Canada) Cliff Thorburn
5	▲	(England) Joe Johnson
6	▲	(Wales) Terry Griffiths
7	▼	(England) Tony Knowles
8	▼	(Northern Ireland) Dennis Taylor
9	▼	(Northern Ireland) Alex Higgins
10	▲	(South Africa) Silvino Francisco
11	▼	(England) Willie Thorne
12	▲	(England) Rex Williams
13	▲	(England) John Parrott
14	Steady	(Wales) Doug Mountjoy
15	▲	(England) Dean Reynolds
16	▲	(England) Mike Hallett
