= 1988 English Professional Championship =

English Professional Championship
Tournament information
- Dates: 4–10 February 1988
- Venue: Corn Exchange
- City: Ipswich
- Country: England
- Format: Non-ranking event
- Total prize fund: £63,000
- Winner's share: £15,000
- Highest break: Barry West (134)

Final
- Champion: Dean Reynolds
- Runner-up: Neal Foulds
- Score: 9–5

The 1988 English Professional Championship was a professional non-ranking snooker tournament, which took place between 4 and 10 February 1988 at the Corn Exchange in Ipswich, England.

Dean Reynolds won the title by defeating Neal Foulds 9–5 in the final.

== Main draw ==
Last 32; Best of 11 frames
Dean Reynolds	6
Dave Gilbert	3
John Parrott	6
Eric Lawlor	3
Tony Meo	6
Fred Davis	3
Steve Longworth	6
Jim Chambers	4
Joe Johnson	6
Jason Smith	5
Dave Martin	6
Martin Smith	5
Tony Knowles	6
Jon Wright	2
Ken Owers	6
David Taylor	3
Neal Foulds	6
Gary Wilkinson	3
Danny Fowler	6
John Spencer	3
Willie Thorne	6
Bob Marshall	3
John Virgo	6
Les Dodd	3
Barry West	6
David Greaves	5
Jimmy White	6
Martin Clark	5
Mike Hallett	6
Steve Duggan	3
Rex Williams	6
Dennis Hughes	1

Last 16; Best of 11 frames
Dean Reynolds	6
John Parrott	2
Tony Meo	6
Steve Longworth	4
Joe Johnson	6
Dave Martin	4
Tony Knowles	6
Ken Owers	4
Neal Foulds	6
Danny Fowler	1
Willie Thorne	6
John Virgo	0
Barry West	6
Jimmy White	2
Mike Hallett	6
Rex Williams	3

Quarter-final; Best of 11 frames
Dean Reynolds	6
Tony Meo	4
Joe Johnson	6
Tony Knowles	4
Neal Foulds	9
Willie Thorne	2
Barry West	6
Mike Hallett	5

Semi-final; Best of 17 frames
Dean Reynolds	9
Joe Johnson	8
Neal Foulds	9
Barry West	6

Final; Best of 17 frames
Dean Reynolds	9
Neal Foulds	5
