= 1984 Costa Del Sol Classic =

Costa Del Sol Classic
Tournament information
- Dates: 20–23 August 1984
- Venue: Las Palmeras Hotel
- City: Fuengirola
- Country: Spain
- Format: Non-Ranking event
- Total prize fund: £2,850
- Winner's share: £600
- Highest break: 105 (Joe Johnson)

Final
- Champion: Dennis Taylor (NIR)
- Runner-up: Mike Hallett (ENG)
- Score: 5–2

The 1984 Costa Del Sol Classic was a professional invitational snooker tournament which took place from 20 to 23 August 1984. The tournament was held at the Las Palmeras Hotel in Fuengirola, Spain, and featured 12 professional players.

The four qualifying matches were played under a best-of-five frames format, as were the quarter-finals and semi-finals, and the final best of nine. Dennis Taylor won the event, by defeating Mike Hallett 5–2 in the final.

== Prize fund ==
The breakdown of prize money for the event is shown below.

- Winner: £600
- Runner-up: £350
- Semi-finalists: £250
- First round: £150
- Highest break: £150

== Qualifying ==
Four players participated in qualifying for the quarter-finals, to which Tony Knowles, Taylor, Joe Johnson and Mark Wildman were already seeded.

=== Round 1 ===
- Mick Fisher (ENG) 3–2 Eugene Hughes (IRE)
- Mike Hallett (ENG) 3–0 Bill Oliver (ENG)
- Murdo MacLeod (SCO) 3–2 Warren King (AUS)
- Eddie Sinclair (SCO) 3–1 Tony Drago (MLT)

== Main draw ==
=== Quarter-finals ===
- Mike Hallett (ENG) 3–0 Tony Knowles (ENG)
- Mark Wildman (ENG) 3–2 Eddie Sinclair (SCO)
- Joe Johnson (ENG) 3–1 Mick Fisher (ENG)
- Dennis Taylor (NIR) 3–1 Murdo MacLeod (SCO)

=== Semi-finals ===
- Mike Hallett (ENG) 3–0 Mark Wildman (ENG)
- Dennis Taylor (NIR) 3–2 Joe Johnson (ENG)

=== Final ===
- Dennis Taylor (NIR) 5–2 Mike Hallett (ENG)

== Century breaks ==
Two century breaks were made during the tournament.

- 105 Joe Johnson (ENG)
- 100 Dennis Taylor (NIR)
