= 1992 Pontins Professional =

Snooker tournament

Tournament information
- Dates: 9–16 May 1992
- Venue: Pontin's
- City: Prestatyn
- Country: Wales
- Organisation: WPBSA
- Format: Non-Ranking event
- Winner's share: £3,500

Final
- Champion: (England) Steve James
- Runner-up: (England) Neal Foulds
- Score: 9–8

The 1992 Pontins Professional was the nineteenth edition of the professional invitational snooker tournament which took place between 9 and 16 May 1992 at Pontin's in Prestatyn, Wales.

The tournament featured eight professional players. The quarter-final matches were contested over the best of 9 frames, the semi-final matches over the best of 11 frames, and the final over the best of 17 frames.

Steve James won the event for the first time, beating Neal Foulds 9–8 in the final.

== Main draw ==
Quarter-finals; Best of 9 frames
(England) Steve James	5
(Canada) Alain Robidoux	1
(Wales) Doug Mountjoy	5
(England) Mike Hallett	4
(England) Neal Foulds	5
(Wales) Darren Morgan	2
(England) Gary Wilkinson	5
(Wales) Steve Newbury	1

Semi-finals; Best of 11 frames
(England) Steve James	6
(Wales) Doug Mountjoy	2
(England) Neal Foulds	6
(England) Gary Wilkinson	2

Final; Best of 17 frames
(England) Steve James	9
(England) Neal Foulds	8
