= 1982 UK Championship =

1982 Coral UK Championship
Tournament information
- Dates: 20 November – 4 December 1982
- Venue: Preston Guild Hall
- City: Preston
- Country: England
- Organisation: WPBSA
- Format: Non-ranking event
- Total prize fund: £47,000
- Winner's share: £11,000
- Highest break: (Northern Ireland) Alex Higgins (137)

Final
- Champion: (Wales) Terry Griffiths
- Runner-up: (Northern Ireland) Alex Higgins
- Score: 16–15

The 1982 UK Championship (officially the 1982 Coral UK Championship) was a professional non-ranking snooker tournament that took place at the Guild Hall in Preston, England, between 20 November and 4 December 1982. This was the sixth edition of the UK Championship and the fifth staging of the competition in Preston. The event was sponsored by Coral for the fifth year in a row. The televised stages were shown on the BBC from 27 November from the quarter-finals through to the end of the championship.

Terry Griffiths won his first and only UK title by winning the last three frames of the final to defeat Alex Higgins 16–15. On his way to victory, Griffiths also beat defending champion Steve Davis, who had defeated him in the previous year's final. The highest break of the tournament was a 137 made by Higgins.

== Prize fund ==
The breakdown of prize money for this year is shown below:

Winner:	£11,000
Runner-up:	£6,000
Highest break:	£1,000

== Main draw ==
Round of 32; Best of 17 frames
(England) Steve Davis	9
(England) Rex Williams	6
(Republic of Ireland) Patsy Fagan	9
(England) Bob Harris	6
(Wales) Terry Griffiths	9
(England) Joe Johnson	1
(Northern Ireland) Dennis Taylor	9
(England) Jim Meadowcroft	7
(England) David Taylor	9
(England) Les Dodd	7
(England) Graham Miles	4
(England) Tony Meo	9
(England) John Virgo	9
(Republic of Ireland) Billy Kelly	2
(Wales) Doug Mountjoy	9
(England) Pat Houlihan	3
(Northern Ireland) Alex Higgins	9
(England) Dave Martin	7
(England) Dean Reynolds	9
(England) Mick Fisher	6
(England) Tony Knowles	9
(Scotland) Jim Donnelly	6
(England) John Spencer	9
(Scotland) Eddie Sinclair	8
(England) Jimmy White	9
(England) Paul Medati	7
(England) Willie Thorne	7
(Wales) Cliff Wilson	9
(England) Fred Davis	7
(England) Mike Hallett	9
(Wales) Ray Reardon	9
(England) Mark Wildman	5

Round of 16; Best of 17 frames
(England) Steve Davis	9
(Republic of Ireland) Patsy Fagan	3
(Wales) Terry Griffiths	9
(Northern Ireland) Dennis Taylor	7
(England) David Taylor	6
(England) Tony Meo	9
(England) John Virgo	9
(Wales) Doug Mountjoy	5
(Northern Ireland) Alex Higgins	9
(England) Dean Reynolds	8
(England) Tony Knowles	6
(England) John Spencer	9
(England) Jimmy White	9
(Wales) Cliff Wilson	5
(England) Mike Hallett	8
(Wales) Ray Reardon	9

Quarter-finals; Best of 17 frames
(England) Steve Davis	6
(Wales) Terry Griffiths	9
(England) Tony Meo	9
(England) John Virgo	6
(Northern Ireland) Alex Higgins	9
(England) John Spencer	5
(England) Jimmy White	8
(Wales) Ray Reardon	9

Semi-finals; Best of 17 frames
(Wales) Terry Griffiths	9
(England) Tony Meo	7
(Northern Ireland) Alex Higgins	9
(Wales) Ray Reardon	6

Final; Best of 31 frames
(Wales) Terry Griffiths	16
(Northern Ireland) Alex Higgins	15

== Final ==
Final: Best of 31 frames. Referee: John Williams; The Guild Hall, Preston, England, 3 and 4 December 1982.
Terry Griffiths; Wales	16–15	Alex Higgins; Northern Ireland
First session: 20–58, 31–90, 56–52, 26–87 (67), 0–114 (67), 73–65 (73), 105–25 (64); Second session: 86–10 (60), 84–50 (56), 25–101 (65), 75–33, 14–92 (84), 61–70 (61), 31–88 (64), 90–23, Third session: 119–8 (52), 112–13 (55, 57), 1–100 (70), 16–115 (76), 63–40, 89–4 (52), 80–20, Fourth session: 4–109 (101), 21–91 (62), 90–34 (77), 31–78 (58), 11–100 (68), 42–68, 86–22, 87–47, 74–22
77	Highest break	101
0	Century breaks	1
10	50+ breaks	11

== Qualifying ==
=== Round 1 ===
Best of 17 frames

(England) Geoff Foulds 9–2 Matt Gibson (Scotland)

(England) Graham Cripsey 6–9 Bob Harris (England)

(England) Vic Harris 9–6 Marcus Owen (Wales)

(England) Les Dodd 9–1 Ian Williamson (England)

(Scotland) Ian Black 3–9 Mick Fisher (England)

(Wales) Clive Everton 4–9 Tommy Murphy (Northern Ireland)

(England) Bernard Bennett w/o–w/d John Phillps (England)

(Wales) Colin Roscoe 9–6 Jackie Rea (Northern Ireland)

=== Round 2 ===
Best of 17 frames

(England) Rex Williams 9–7 Geoff Foulds (England)

(England) Mike Watterson 3–9 Bob Harris (England)

(England) Joe Johnson 9–8 Vic Harris (England)

(England) Jim Meadowcroft 9–8 Dennis Hughes (England)

(England) Doug French 7–9 Les Dodd (England)

(England) Tony Meo 9–5 George Scott (England)

(England) Jack Fitzmaurice 0–9 Billy Kelly (Republic of Ireland)

(England) Pat Houlihan w/o–w/d John Dunning (England)

(England) Dave Martin 9–6 Murdo MacLeod (Scotland)

(England) Ray Edmonds 8–9 Mick Fisher (England)

(Scotland) Jim Donnelly 9–6 Chris Ross (Scotland)

(Scotland) Eddie Sinclair 9–5 Tommy Murphy (Northern Ireland)

(England) Paul Medati 9–1 Bernard Bennett (England)

(Wales) Cliff Wilson 9–6 Eddie McLaughlin (Scotland)

(England) Mike Hallett 9–1 Bert Demarco (Scotland)

(England) Mark Wildman 9–4 Colin Roscoe (Wales)

== Century breaks ==
- 137, 112, 101 – Alex Higgins
- 135 – Dennis Taylor
- 132, 118 – Steve Davis
- 127 – John Virgo
- 119, 110 – Ray Reardon
- 115 – Mark Wildman
- 107 – Graham Cripsey
- 102, 101 – Rex Williams
