= Pontins Professional =

Tournament information
- Venue: Pontins
- Location: Prestatyn
- Country: Wales
- Established: 1974
- Organisation(s): WPBSA
- Format: Non-ranking event
- Final year: 2000
- Final champion: (Wales) Darren Morgan

The Pontins Professional was an invitational professional non-ranking snooker tournament which ran from 1974 until 2000.

== History ==
Top snooker professionals had regularly supplemented their income from professional events by playing exhibition matches on the holiday camp circuit, with Pontins being a regular venue for entertaining holiday-makers. Beginning in 1974, a tournament involving eight professional players began at Pontins and became a regular point in the snooker calendar, usually occurring in the summer after the World Snooker Championship. This ran in conjunction with the Pontins Open, in which young amateur players can take part and qualify for the Professional event, provided a springboard for future stars such as Paul Hunter and Judd Trump. There were also juniors, seniors, and ladies events.

While top professional players regularly entered in the tournament's early years, the increase in the number of events on the snooker tour led to the biggest stars choosing not to enter in later years, and the professional tournament was last held in 2000.

== Winners ==
Year	Winner	Runner-up	Final score	Season
1974	(Wales) Ray Reardon	(England) John Spencer	10–9	1973/74
1975	(Wales) Ray Reardon	(England) John Spencer	10–9	1974/75
1976	(Wales) Ray Reardon	(England) Fred Davis	10–4	1975/76
1977	(England) John Spencer	(England) John Pulman	7–5	1976/77
1978	(Wales) Ray Reardon	(England) John Spencer	7–2	1977/78
1979	(Wales) Doug Mountjoy	(England) Graham Miles	8–4	1978/79
1980	(England) John Virgo	(Wales) Ray Reardon	9–6	1979/80
1981	(Wales) Terry Griffiths	(England) Willie Thorne	9–8	1980/81
1982	(England) Steve Davis	(Wales) Ray Reardon	9–4	1981/82
1983	(Wales) Doug Mountjoy	(Wales) Ray Reardon	9–7	1982/83
1984	(England) Willie Thorne	(England) John Spencer	9–7	1983/84
1985	(Wales) Terry Griffiths	(England) John Spencer	9–7	1984/85
1986	(Wales) Terry Griffiths	(England) Willie Thorne	9–6	1985/86
1987	(England) Neal Foulds	(England) Willie Thorne	9–6	1986/87
1988	(England) John Parrott	(England) Mike Hallett	9–1	1987/88
1989	(Wales) Darren Morgan	(Malta) Tony Drago	9–2	1988/89
1990	(Scotland) Stephen Hendry	(England) Mike Hallett	9–6	1989/90
1991	(England) Neal Foulds	(England) Mike Hallett	9–6	1990/91
1992	(England) Steve James	(England) Neal Foulds	9–8	1991/92
1993	(Republic of Ireland) Ken Doherty	(Wales) Darren Morgan	9–3	1992/93
1994	(Republic of Ireland) Ken Doherty	(England) Nigel Bond	9–5	1993/94
1995	(England) Peter Ebdon	(Republic of Ireland) Ken Doherty	9–8	1994/95
1996	(Republic of Ireland) Ken Doherty	(England) Nigel Bond	9–7	1995/96
1997	(England) Martin Clark	(England) Andy Hicks	9–7	1996/97
1998	(Wales) Mark Williams	(England) Martin Clark	9–6	1997/98
1999	(England) Jimmy White	(Wales) Matthew Stevens	9–5	1998/99
2000	(Wales) Darren Morgan	(England) Jimmy White	9–2	1999/00

== Statistics ==
=== Finalists ===
Rank	Name	Nationality	Winner	Runner-up	Finals
1	Ray Reardon	Wales	4	3	7
2	Ken Doherty	Ireland	3	1	4
3	Terry Griffiths	Wales	3	0	3
4	Neal Foulds	England	2	1	3
4	Darren Morgan	Wales	2	1	3
6	Doug Mountjoy	Wales	2	0	2
7	John Spencer	England	1	5	6
8	Willie Thorne	England	1	3	4
9	Martin Clark	England	1	1	2
9	Jimmy White	England	1	1	2
11	Steve Davis	England	1	0	1
11	Peter Ebdon	England	1	0	1
11	Stephen Hendry	Scotland	1	0	1
11	Steve James	England	1	0	1
11	John Parrott	England	1	0	1
11	John Virgo	England	1	0	1
11	Mark Williams	Wales	1	0	1
18	Mike Hallett	England	0	3	3
19	Nigel Bond	England	0	2	2
20	Fred Davis	England	0	1	1
20	Tony Drago	Malta	0	1	1
20	Andy Hicks	England	0	1	1
20	Graham Miles	England	0	1	1
20	John Pulman	England	0	1	1
20	Matthew Stevens	Wales	0	1	1

=== Champions by country ===
Country	Players	Total	First title	Last title
Wales	5	12	1974	2000
England	10	11	1977	1999
Ireland	1	3	1993	1996
Scotland	1	1	1990	1990

== See also ==
- Pontins Camber Sands Championship
- Pontins Open
- International Open Series – successor of the event with increased amateur participation
