= 1991 Pontins Professional =

Tournament information
- Dates: 11–18 May 1991
- Venue: Pontin's
- City: Prestatyn
- Country: Wales
- Organisation: WPBSA
- Format: Non-Ranking event
- Winner's share: £3,500

Final
- Champion: (England) Neal Foulds
- Runner-up: (England) Mike Hallett
- Score: 9–6

The 1991 Pontins Professional was the eighteenth edition of the professional invitational snooker tournament which took place between 11 and 18 May 1991 at Pontin's in Prestatyn, Wales.

The tournament featured eight professional players. The quarter-final matches were contested over the best of 9 frames, the semi-final matches over the best of 11 frames, and the final over the best of 17 frames.

Neal Foulds won the event for the second time, beating Mike Hallett 9–6 in the final.

== Main draw ==
Quarter-finals; Best of 9 frames
(England) Neal Foulds	5
(England) Joe Johnson	3
(Wales) Doug Mountjoy	5
(Wales) Darren Morgan	2
(England) Mike Hallett	5
(Wales) Cliff Wilson	1
(Wales) Steve Newbury	5
(England) Martin Clark	1

Semi-finals; Best of 11 frames
(England) Neal Foulds	6
(Wales) Doug Mountjoy	3
(England) Mike Hallett	6
(Wales) Steve Newbury	3

Final; Best of 17 frames
(England) Neal Foulds	9
(England) Mike Hallett	6
