= 1993 Pot Black =

Pot Black 93
Tournament information
- Dates: 28 August 1993 (broadcast 6 September – 20 October 1993)
- Venue: Pebble Mill Studios
- City: Birmingham
- Country: England
- Organisation: WPBSA
- Format: Non-Ranking event
- Highest break: (England) David Roe (104)

Final
- Champion: (England) Steve Davis
- Runner-up: (England) Mike Hallett
- Score: 2–0

The 1993 Pot Black was the third of the revived professional invitational snooker tournament, the 21st series altogether and the last series of Pot Black in its traditional form. Recording took place on 28 August 1993 and broadcast in the autumn of the same year. The tournament was held at Pebble Mill Studios in Birmingham for the first time since the original series ended in 1986, and had reverted to the traditional format after the 1992 "Timeframe" was unpopular with viewers and players. It featured sixteen professional players in a knock-out system. All matches until the semi-final were one-frame shoot-outs, the semi-final was an aggregate score of two frames and the final being contested over the best of three frames.

Broadcasts were shown on Monday afternoons on BBC1 except the semi-finals and final were for three days and the series started at 15:05 on Monday 6 September 1993 and now had two matches in one programme up to the semi-finals. David Vine was the new presenter for the series replacing Eamonn Holmes and Ted Lowe remained in the commentary box with some of the players as co-commentators during various episodes while John Williams refereed the series.

The final was won by Steve Davis beating Mike Hallett 2–0 and winning the Pot Black title for the fourth time beating John Spencer and Eddie Charlton's record of three titles.

Jimmy White and Alan McManus were expected to feature in the event, but on the day of recording White was unavailable due to an injured toe, and the car that McManus's maager was driving him broke down in Scotland. The next two players on the ranking list that could get to the Birmingham venue in time were Peter Edbon and Hallett, and they took up the vacant places.

== Main draw ==
Last 16
(England) Neal Foulds	0
(England) Steve James	1
(Northern Ireland) Dennis Taylor	1
(England) Willie Thorne	0
(Wales) Darren Morgan	0
(England) Peter Ebdon	1
(England) Mike Hallett	1
(England) Nigel Bond	0
(England) John Parrott	0
(England) David Roe	1
(England) Steve Davis	1
(England) Martin Clark	0
(Wales) Terry Griffiths	1
(Republic of Ireland) Ken Doherty	0
(Scotland) Stephen Hendry	1
(England) Gary Wilkinson	0

Quarter-finals
(England) Steve James	1
(Northern Ireland) Dennis Taylor	0
(England) Peter Ebdon	0
(England) Mike Hallett	1
(England) David Roe	0
(England) Steve Davis	1
(Wales) Terry Griffiths	0
(Scotland) Stephen Hendry	1

Semi-finals; Aggregate score of 2 frames
(England) Steve James	0
(England) Mike Hallett	1
(England) Steve Davis	1
(Scotland) Stephen Hendry	0

Final; Best of 3 frames
(England) Mike Hallett	0
(England) Steve Davis	2

Match dates of transmission

Player 1	Player 2	Broadcast Date
(England) Steve James	(England) Neal Foulds	6 September 1993
(Northern Ireland) Dennis Taylor	(England) Willie Thorne	6 September 1993
(England) Peter Ebdon	(Wales) Darren Morgan	13 September 1993
(England) Mike Hallett	(England) Nigel Bond	13 September 1993
(England) David Roe	(England) John Parrott	20 September 1993
(England) Steve Davis	(England) Martin Clark	20 September 1993
(Wales) Terry Griffiths	(Republic of Ireland) Ken Doherty	27 September 1993
(Scotland) Stephen Hendry	(England) Gary Wilkinson	27 September 1993
(England) Steve James	(Northern Ireland) Dennis Taylor	4 October 1993
(England) Mike Hallett	(England) Peter Ebdon	4 October 1993
(England) Steve Davis	(England) David Roe	11 October 1993
(Scotland) Stephen Hendry	(Wales) Terry Griffiths	11 October 1993
(England) Mike Hallett	(England) Steve James	18 October 1993
(England) Steve Davis	(Scotland) Stephen Hendry	19 October 1993
(England) Steve Davis	(England) Mike Hallett	20 October 1993

== Final ==
Final: Best of 3 frames. Referee: John Williams; Pebble Mill Studios, Birmingham, England, 28 August 1993 (Broadcast 20 October 1993).
Steve Davis; England	2–0	Mike Hallett; England
