= 1976 Pontins Professional =

Tournament information
- Dates: 1–8 May 1976
- Venue: Pontin's
- City: Prestatyn
- Country: Wales
- Organisation: WPBSA
- Format: Non-Ranking event
- Winner's share: £1,000
- Highest break: Ray Reardon (WAL) (123)

Final
- Champion: (Wales) Ray Reardon
- Runner-up: (England) Fred Davis
- Score: 10–9

The 1976 Pontins Professional was the third edition of the professional invitational snooker tournament which took place between 1 and 8 May 1976 in Prestatyn, Wales.

The tournament featured eight professional players. The quarter-final and semi-final matches were contested over the best of 13 frames, and the final was the best of 19 frames.

Ray Reardon won the event for the third time in a row, beating Fred Davis 10–9 in the final. He also made the highest break of the tournament, 123, in the seventh frame of the final.

== Main draw ==
Quarter-finals; Best of 13 frames
(Wales) Ray Reardon	7
(Northern Ireland) Dennis Taylor	4
(England) John Spencer	7
(England) John Pulman	2
(England) Fred Davis	7
(England) Willie Thorne	4
(England) Graham Miles	7
(England) Rex Williams	5

Semi-finals; Best of 13 frames
(Wales) Ray Reardon	7
(England) John Spencer	3
(England) Fred Davis	7
(England) Graham Miles	2

Final; Best of 19 frames
(Wales) Ray Reardon	10
(England) Fred Davis	9
