= 1988 Fosters Professional =

Fosters Professional
Tournament information
- Dates: 3–5 October 1988
- Venue: RTÉ Studios
- City: Dublin
- Country: Ireland
- Organisation: WPBSA
- Format: Non-ranking event
- Total prize fund: £34,650
- Winner's share: £12,500
- Highest break: Stephen Hendry (SCO) (99)

Final
- Champion: Mike Hallett (ENG)
- Runner-up: Stephen Hendry (SCO)
- Score: 8–5

The 1988 Fosters Professional was a non-ranking invitational snooker tournament, which took place between 3 and 5 October 1988. The tournament featured four professional players and was filmed in RTÉ Studios, Dublin, for broadcast on RTÉ.

Mike Hallett won the tournament defeating Stephen Hendry 8–5. Hendry made the highest break of the event, 99.

== Prize fund ==
The breakdown of prize money for this year is shown below:

- Winner: £12,500
- Runner-up: £8,500
- Semi-final: £5,825
- Highest break: £2,000
- Total: £34,650

== Main draw ==
Results are shown below.

Semi-finals; Best of 9 frames
Mike Hallett (ENG)	5
John Parrott (ENG)	3
Stephen Hendry (SCO)	5
Eugene Hughes (IRL)	1

Final; Best of 15 frames
Mike Hallett (ENG)	8
Stephen Hendry (SCO)	5
