= 1990 Pontins Professional =

Tournament information
- Dates: 7-9 May 1990
- Venue: Pontin's
- City: Prestatyn
- Country: Wales
- Organisation: WPBSA
- Format: Non-Ranking event

Final
- Champion: (Scotland) Stephen Hendry
- Runner-up: (England) Mike Hallett
- Score: 9–6

The 1990 Pontins Professional was the seventeenth edition of the professional invitational snooker tournament which took place in May 1990 in Prestatyn, Wales.

The tournament featured eight professional players. The quarter-final matches were contested over the best of 9 frames, the semi-final matches over the best of 11 frames, and the final over the best of 17 frames.

Stephen Hendry won the event for the first time, beating Mike Hallett 9–6 in the final.

== Main draw ==
Quarter-finals; Best of 9 frames
(Scotland) Stephen Hendry	5
(England) Joe Johnson	1
(Thailand) James Wattana	5
(England) Martin Clark	4
(England) Mike Hallett	5
(Malta) Tony Drago	3
(Wales) Cliff Wilson	5
(Wales) Darren Morgan	3

Semi-finals; Best of 11 frames
(Scotland) Stephen Hendry	6
(Thailand) James Wattana	2
(England) Mike Hallett	6
(Wales) Cliff Wilson	0

Final; Best of 17 frames
(Scotland) Stephen Hendry	9
(England) Mike Hallett	6
