= 1988 Pontins Professional =

Tournament information
- Dates: 7–14 May 1988
- Venue: Pontin's
- City: Prestatyn
- Country: Wales
- Organisation: WPBSA
- Format: Non-Ranking event
- Winner's share: £3,500

Final
- Champion: (England) John Parrott
- Runner-up: (England) Mike Hallett
- Score: 9–1

The 1988 Pontins Professional was the fifteenth edition of the professional invitational snooker tournament which took place between 7 and 14 May 1988 at Pontin's in Prestatyn, Wales.

The tournament featured eight professional players. The quarter-final matches were contested over the best of 9 frames, the semi-final matches over the best of 11 frames, and the final over the best of 17 frames.

John Parrott won the event for the first time, beating Mike Hallett 9–1 in the final.

== Main draw ==
Quarter-finals; Best of 9 frames
(England) John Parrott | 5
(England) Dean Reynolds | 0
(Scotland) Stephen Hendry | 5
(England) Tony Meo | 3
(England) Mike Hallett | 5
(Republic of Ireland) Eugene Hughes | 0
(Malta) Tony Drago | 5
(England) Neal Foulds | 3

Semi-finals; Best of 11 frames
(England) John Parrott | 6
(Scotland) Stephen Hendry | 3
(England) Mike Hallett | 6
(Malta) Tony Drago | 2

Final; Best of 17 frames
(England) John Parrott | 9
(England) Mike Hallett | 1
