= Mike Hallett =

English snooker player and commentator

Personal information
- Born: 6 July 1959 (age 67) Grimsby, Lincolnshire, England

Sport
- Country: England
- Sport: Snooker
- Professional: 1980–1997, 1998/1999, 2000/2001, 2004/2005
- Highest ranking: 6 (1989/90)

Tournament wins
- Ranking: 1

Mike Hallett (born 6 July 1959) is an English former professional snooker player and commentator. He won the 1989 Hong Kong Open.

== Career ==
Hallett was born in Grimsby on 6 July 1959. Having won the national under-16 title in 1975, he turned professional in 1979. His world ranking peaked at number six, in the 1989/1990 list. His only ranking tournament victory was at the 1989 Hong Kong Open in which he defeated Dene O'Kane 9–8.

In a semi-final match against John Parrott in the 1988 Benson & Hedges Masters, he recovered from needing three snookers to win the decider 6–5. However, he lost 0–9 to Steve Davis in the final, the first whitewash in the Masters final.

Three years later, in 1991 he reached the Masters Final again at Wembley where, in the best-of-17-frame match, he surged to a 7–0 lead over Stephen Hendry and missed a pink which would have put him 8–0 ahead. He then moved into an 8–2 lead and needed just the pink and black to clear for the match in the eleventh frame, but missed the shot with the rest. Hendry took that frame and managed to spring a comeback to win the match 9–8. Hallett would go on to win two invitational World Series of Snooker events later in the year, but did not win another professional title after 1991.

Hallett did reach the quarter-finals of the World Championship twice, but never progressed further. His final season on the main tour was in 2004–05, after which he went on to play in the Pontin's International Open Series.

At the start of the 2011/12 season Hallett entered the Players Tour Championship and after winning his first two matches against Duane Jones 4-3 and Elliot Slessor also 4–3, he played Ronnie O'Sullivan and managed to take two frames in losing 4–2.

In August 2021 Hallett suffered from a stroke with rehabilitation taking place at the wellness hub at Grimsby Health and Wellbeing Centre.

== Performance and rankings timeline ==
Tournament	1979/ 80	1980/ 81	1981/ 82	1982/ 83	1983/ 84	1984/ 85	1985/ 86	1986/ 87	1987/ 88	1988/ 89	1989/ 90	1990/ 91	1991/ 92	1992/ 93	1993/ 94	1994/ 95	1995/ 96	1996/ 97	1997/ 98	1998/ 99	2000/ 01	2004/ 05
Ranking	(Note: He was an amateur.)	(Note: New players on the Main Tour do not have a ranking.)	29	31	32	25	28	27	16	9	6	7	8	17	19	23	34	46				
Ranking tournaments
Grand Prix (Note: The event ran under a different name as Professional Players Tournament (1982/1983 to 1983/1984).)	Not Held			2R	3R	3R	2R	3R	1R	3R	2R	3R	3R	2R	2R	1R	1R	LQ	A	LQ	LQ	LQ
British Open (Note: The event was known as British Gold Cup (1979/1980), Yamaha Organs Trophy (1980/1981) and International Masters (1981/1982 to 1983/1984).)	Non-Ranking Event					2R	2R	2R	F	SF	2R	QF	2R	2R	2R	3R	2R	LQ	A	LQ	LQ	LQ
UK Championship	Non-Ranking Event					1R	2R	3R	QF	1R	QF	2R	1R	3R	2R	1R	LQ	LQ	A	LQ	LQ	LQ
Welsh Open	Tournament Not Held												1R	QF	1R	2R	1R	LQ	A	LQ	LQ	LQ
Malta Cup (Note: The event ran under different names such as European Open (1988/1989 to 1996/1997) and Irish Open (1998/1999).)	Tournament Not Held									SF	1R	1R	1R	2R	LQ	1R	LQ	LQ	A	LQ	NH	LQ
Irish Masters	Non-ranking Event																					LQ
China Open (Note: The event ran under different names as China International (1997/1998 and 1998/1999))	Tournament Not Held																		NR	LQ	LQ	LQ
World Championship	LQ	LQ	1R	1R	1R	1R	2R	QF	2R	QF	2R	1R	1R	LQ	LQ	LQ	LQ	LQ	A	LQ	LQ	LQ
Non-ranking tournaments
The Masters	A	A	A	A	A	A	A	A	F	1R	1R	F	1R	A	A	A	A	A	A	A	A	A
Premier League (Note: The event was also called the Professional Snooker League (1983/1984), the Matchroom League (1986/1987–1991/1992) and the European League (1992/1993–1996/1997))	Tournament Not Held				A	Not Held		A	A	A	A	A	RR	A	A	A	A	A	A	A	A	A
Former ranking tournaments
Canadian Masters (Note: The event run under the name Canadian Open (1979/1980 to 1980/1981))	NR		Not Held				Non-Ranking			SF	Tournament Not Held											
Hong Kong Open (Note: The event ran under different names as Australian Masters (1979/1980 to 1987/1988 and 1995/1996) and Australian Open (1994/1995).)	Non-Ranking Event									NH	W	Tournament Not Held				NR	NR	Tournament Not Held				
Classic	Non-Ranking Event				2R	1R	2R	2R	1R	1R	2R	SF	QF	Tournament Not Held								
Strachan Open	NH												1R	MR	NR	Tournament Not Held						
Dubai Classic (Note: The event run under different names as Dubai Masters (1988/1989), Thailand Classic (1995/1996) and Asian Classic (1996/1997))	Tournament Not Held									NR	1R	QF	1R	2R	LQ	LQ	LQ	LQ	Not Held			
German Open	Tournament Not Held																LQ	LQ	A	NR	Not Held	
Thailand Masters (Note: The event ran under different names such as Asian Open (1989/1990 to 1992/1993) and Thailand Open (1993/1994 to 1996/1997).)	Tournament Not Held				Non-Ranking Event				Not Held		2R	SF	2R	2R	LQ	LQ	LQ	LQ	A	LQ	LQ	NH
Scottish Open (Note: The event ran under different names such as International Open (1981/1982 to 1984/1985, 1986/1987 to 1996/1997) and Goya Matchroom Trophy (1985/1986).)	Not Held		NR	LQ	LQ	LQ	1R	1R	SF	2R	2R	Not Held		2R	2R	3R	1R	LQ	A	LQ	LQ	NH
Former non-ranking tournaments
Bass & Golden Leisure Classic	Not Held		SF	Tournament Not Held																		
UK Championship	1R	1R	1R	2R	2R	Ranking Event																
British Open (Note: The event was known as British Gold Cup (1979/1980), Yamaha Organs Trophy (1980/1981) and International Masters (1981/1982 to 1983/1984))	LQ	RR	LQ	LQ	LQ	Ranking Event																
Costa Del Sol Classic	Tournament Not Held					F	Tournament Not Held															
Hong Kong Open (Note: The event ran under different names as Australian Masters (1979/1980 to 1987/1988 and 1995/1996) and Australian Open (1994/1995).)	A	A	A	A	A	A	A	A	F	NH	R	Tournament Not Held				A	A	Tournament Not Held				
Fosters Professional	Tournament Not Held					A	A	A	A	W	Tournament Not Held											
English Professional Championship	NH	1R	Not Held			2R	SF	QF	QF	W	Tournament Not Held											
New Zealand Masters	Tournament Not Held					A	Not Held			F	QF	Tournament Not Held										
International League	Tournament Not Held										RR	Tournament Not Held										
London Masters	Tournament Not Held									A	QF	A	Tournament Not Held									
Shoot-Out	Tournament Not Held											F	Tournament Not Held									
Norwich Union Grand Prix	Tournament Not Held									A	QF	QF	Tournament Not Held									
World Masters	Tournament Not Held											3R	Tournament Not Held									
Thailand Masters	Tournament Not Held				A	A	A	A	Not Held		Ranking		QF	Ranking Event								NH
Hong Kong Challenge	Tournament Not Held				A	A	A	A	A	A	NH	QF	1R	Tournament Not Held								
Indian Challenge	Tournament Not Held												QF	Tournament Not Held								
World Matchplay	Tournament Not Held									QF	1R	1R	QF	A	Tournament Not Held							
Belgian Challenge	Tournament Not Held												SF	Tournament Not Held								
Irish Masters	A	A	A	A	A	A	A	A	A	QF	1R	1R	SF	A	A	A	A	A	A	A	A	R
European Challenge	Tournament Not Held												SF	A	Tournament Not Held							
Belgian Masters	Tournament Not Held											QF	W	QF	Not Held		A	Tournament Not Held				
Pot Black	A	A	A	A	A	A	A	Tournament Not Held					1R	A	F	Tournament Not Held						
Scottish Masters	Not Held		A	A	A	A	A	A	A	NH	QF	1R	W	QF	A	QF	A	A	A	A	A	NH
Pontins Professional	A	A	A	A	A	A	A	A	F	QF	F	F	QF	SF	QF	QF	QF	QF	QF	QF	Not Held	

Performance Table Legend
LQ	lost in the qualifying draw	#R	lost in the early rounds of the tournament (WR = Wildcard round, RR = Round robin)	QF	lost in the quarter-finals
SF	lost in the semi–finals	F	lost in the final	W	won the tournament
DNQ	did not qualify for the tournament	A	did not participate in the tournament	WD	withdrew from the tournament

NH / Not Held	means an event was not held.
NR / Non-Ranking Event	means an event is/was no longer a ranking event.
R / Ranking Event	means an event is/was a ranking event.
MR / Minor-Ranking Event	means an event is/was a minor-ranking event.

== Career finals ==
=== Ranking finals: 2 (1 title) ===
Outcome	No.	Year	Championship	Opponent in the final	Score
Runner-up	1.	1988	British Open	(Scotland) Stephen Hendry	2–13
Winner	1.	1989	Hong Kong Open	(Australia) Dene O'Kane	9–8

=== Non-ranking finals: 16 (6 titles) ===
Legend
The Masters (0–2)
Other (6–8)

Outcome	No.	Year	Championship	Opponent in the final	Score
Runner-up	1.	1984	Costa Del Sol Classic	(England) Dennis Taylor	2–5
Winner	1.	1986	Clacton Professional	(England) Tony Jones	5–3
Runner-up	2.	1987	Australian Masters	(Scotland) Stephen Hendry	226–371 points
Winner	2.	1987	Clacton Professional	(Northern Ireland) Jack McLaughlin	6–1
Runner-up	3.	1988	The Masters	(England) Steve Davis	0–9
Runner-up	4.	1988	Pontins Professional	(England) John Parrott	1–9
Runner-up	5.	1988	New Zealand Masters	(Scotland) Stephen Hendry	1–6
Winner	3.	1988	Fosters Professional	(Scotland) Stephen Hendry	8–5
Winner	4.	1989	English Professional Championship	(England) John Parrott	9–7
Runner-up	6.	1990	Pontins Professional (2)	(Scotland) Stephen Hendry	6–9
Runner-up	7.	1990	Shoot-Out	(Wales) Darren Morgan	1–2
Runner-up	8.	1991	The Masters	(Scotland) Stephen Hendry	8–9
Runner-up	9.	1991	Pontins Professional (3)	(England) Neal Foulds	6–9
Winner	5.	1991	Scottish Masters	(England) Steve Davis	10–6
Winner	6.	1991	Belgian Masters	(England) Neal Foulds	9–7
Runner-up	10.	1993	Pot Black	(England) Steve Davis	0–2

=== Pro-am finals: 4 (3 titles) ===
Outcome	No.	Year	Championship	Opponent in the final	Score
Winner	1.	1989	Dutch Open	(Wales) Darren Morgan	6–5
Winner	2.	1991	Pontins Spring Open	(England) Wayne Brown	7–5
Winner	3.	1993	Pontins Spring Open (2)	(England) Steve James	7–6
Runner-up	1.	2003	Pontins Spring Open	(England) Judd Trump	2–4

=== Team finals: 3 (2 titles) ===
Outcome	No.	Year	Championship	Team/partner	Opponent(s) in the final	Score
Runner-up	1.	1986	World Doubles Championship	(Scotland) Stephen Hendry	(England) Steve Davis (England) Tony Meo	3–12
Winner	1.	1987	World Doubles Championship	(Scotland) Stephen Hendry	(Canada) Cliff Thorburn (Northern Ireland) Dennis Taylor	12–8
Winner	2.	1991	World Masters Doubles	(Scotland) Stephen Hendry	(Canada) Brady Gollan (Canada) Jim Wych	8–5
