= Mick Fisher =

English snooker player

Personal information
- Born: 12 July 1944 (age 82)

Sport
- Country: England
- Sport: Snooker
- Professional: 1982–1997
- Highest ranking: 37 (1983/1984)
- Best ranking finish: Last 16 (x1)

Mick Fisher (born 12 July 1944) is an English former professional snooker player. He appeared once at the main stage of the World Snooker Championship during his career, and attained a highest professional ranking of 37th, in the Snooker world rankings 1983/1984.

== Career ==
Mick Fisher was born on 12 July 1944. He started entering snooker tournaments aged 29, and despite a lack of notable tournament success as an amateur, his application to become a professional snooker player was accepted by the World Professional Billiards and Snooker Association in 1982.

In his first season on tour, he played in three ranking tournaments and recorded last-32 finishes in each; at the 1982 International Open, he defeated Tommy Murphy 5–1 and Fred Davis 5–3, but lost 1–5 in his match against David Taylor, while the UK Championship of that year brought victories over Ian Black and Ray Edmonds before a 6–9 loss to Dean Reynolds. Fisher reached the main stages of the 1983 World Snooker Championship at the Crucible Theatre, overcoming Patsy Fagan 10–8 and Eddie McLaughlin 10–9 in the qualifying competition. He faced Kirk Stevens in the last 32 and lost 2–10.

During the 1983–84 snooker season, Fisher again beat Davis, this time 5–4 in the 1983 Professional Players Tournament, but his subsequent 4–5 loss to Eddie Charlton was his only last-32 finish in six events. He had begun the season ranked 37th – a career best – but finished it at 42nd. Fisher won only one match in the 1985–86 snooker season, a 5–3 defeat of Jackie Rea in the 1984 Classic, which preceded a 0–5 whitewash at the hands of Alex Higgins.

At the 1987 Classic, Fisher again beat Davis – on this occasion, 5–2 – but lost 0–5 to Charlton in the last 64. He started the 1987–88 season ranked 92nd. At the 1987 Grand Prix he beat Paul Watchorn 5–4, before whitewashing Davis 5–0 and overcoming Eugene Hughes and Martin Clark to reach the last 16 stage for the first time in his career.

In his last-16 match, Fisher held Bob Chaperon to 2–3 but eventually lost 2–5. He earned £4,500 prize money and two ranking points from the tournament. With these his only full ranking points in the two years that counted for rankings, he improved his ranking position to 58th in the Snooker world rankings 1988/1989.

In the 1990 Grand Prix, Fisher defeated six-time World Champion Ray Reardon 5–4 in one of Reardon's final matches; the latter would retire from the game at the end of the season. Fisher lost his next match 3–5 to Joe O'Boye.

Fisher began the 1994–95 snooker season ranked 247th, and lost 1–5 in qualifying for the 1995 World Championship to Matthew McGrotty. The last of his three victories that season came in the 1995 British Open, where he eliminated Huseyin Hursid 5–1, but lost his next match 0–5 to Amrik Cheema.

Fisher did not play at competitive level again; ranked 443rd, he was relegated from the tour in 1997.
