= Paddy Browne =

Irish former professional snooker player

Personal information
- Born: 1 March 1965 (age 61) Dublin. Ireland

Sport
- Country: (Republic of Ireland) Ireland
- Sport: Snooker
- Professional: 1983–1997
- Highest ranking: 43 (1987/1988)
- Best ranking finish: Quarter-final (x1)

Paddy Browne (born 1 April 1965) is an Irish former professional snooker player.

== Career ==
Born in 1965 in Dublin, in 1979 he won the Irish National U-16 Championship and was invited to appear on the BBC’s Junior Pot Black where Paddy played with top English juniors such as John Parrott and Dean Reynolds. The next year he won the Irish National U-19 Championships. The next year, still only 17 years old, he won the Irish senior National Championships, and followed it up with a victory over Belfast’s Sammy Pavis to win the All Ireland National trophy.

Browne turned professional in 1983, having won the 1982 Republic of Ireland amateur championship. In his first season, he entered four tournaments, reaching the last 48 at the 1984 World Championship, where he defeated Steve Duggan and Colin Roscoe but lost 1–10 to Eddie Sinclair.

Recording his first last-32 finish at a ranking event in the 1985 Classic - where Jimmy White eliminated him 5–2 - Browne went one round better at the 1986 Open. There, he overcame Dessie Sheehan, incumbent World Champion Joe Johnson and Mark Bennett to reach the last 16, but was beaten 3–5 by Stephen Hendry.

Browne was ranked 43rd, a career-best, for the 1987/1988 season, but that season heralded only poor form; having registered one last-32 finish, at the 1988 British Open, he finished it with a loss to Steve James in qualifying for the 1988 World Championship. After levelling the match at 1–1, Browne lost nine consecutive frames to succumb 1–10.

Having slipped to 54th in the rankings, Browne required a sharp upturn in fortunes in the 1988/1989 season, and this he found, recording his first quarter-final appearance at the 1989 Classic. After beating Ian Williamson, Mike Hallett, James and Tony Chappel, he faced the resurgent Doug Mountjoy; from 1–4 behind, Browne rallied to 3–4, but the eventual champion held on to win the eighth frame by four points, and the match 5–3. Browne won the only professional title of his career in the 1988 WPBSA Non-ranking Event Two invitational. Browne beat Peter Francisco 5–1 in the final.

At the 1989 World Championship, Browne defeated Steve Meakin 10–9 having trailed 4–9, before overcoming Murdo MacLeod 10–6 and recording a 10–0 victory over Steve Longworth to reach the main stages at the Crucible Theatre for the first time. In the last 32, he played Willie Thorne, leading 5–4 but going on to lose 5–10. He finished the season ranked 44th.

The next few seasons brought no success for Browne; in 1991/1992, his highest earning performances were two last-128 runs, while the unknown Hong Kong player Franky Chan beat him 5–2 in the 1992 Strachan Open. At that year's World Championship, Browne himself was the victim of a 10–0 whitewash, at the hands of Jason Ferguson.

By 1994, Browne had fallen to 164th in the rankings, and a 3–10 loss to Surinder Gill in qualifying for the 1995 World Championship would be his last at competitive level. He did not enter another tournament and was relegated from the tour in 1997, aged 32.

== Personal life ==
Browne suffers from osteoporosis, and by the time he stopped playing professional snooker at 32 he had had both hips replaced and needed shoulder surgery. Not playing professionally allowed him to treat his body with prescribed pain-reducing medication that was on the banned medication list. A married father of three, in 2021 he had become a grandfather and was managing a snooker club in Salford.

=== Non-ranking wins: (1) ===
- WPBSA Invitational - Event 2 – 1988
