= Martin Smith (snooker player) =

English snooker player

Personal information
- Born: 12 June 1961 (age 65)

Sport
- Country: England
- Sport: Snooker
- Professional: 1985–1993
- Highest ranking: 72 (1988–89)
- Best ranking finish: Last 32 (x2)

Martin Smith (born 12 June 1961) is an English former professional snooker player.

== Career ==
Smith turned professional in 1985. In his first season on the main tour he won his first competitive match 5–2 against Dessie Sheehan, but earned only £984 in prize money, at the 1986 Classic, where he lost 4–5 to Perrie Mans in the last 64.

Beginning the 1986/1987 season ranked 94th, he lost 5–0 to Tony Jones in the Grand Prix - earning £150, his only prize money this season, in doing so - and reached the last 48 at the English Professional Championship, where Les Dodd beat him 6–3.

However, the following season brought runs to the last-32 stage of two tournaments; at the 1987 UK Championship, he defeated Frank Jonik, Paddy Browne and Doug Mountjoy before losing 8–9 to John Campbell, and in the English Professional Championship, he recorded a 6–1 win over Graham Miles prior to losing 5–6 to Dave Martin.

These performances enhanced Smith's ranking to 72nd, a career best, and further positive results came during 1988/1989; he reached the last-16 in a non-ranking tournament, with victories over Mick Price and Ken Owers, losing at that stage 1–5 to Craig Edwards.

At the 1989 International Open, he defeated Dennis Hughes, Martin and veteran Rex Williams to reach the last 32 for the second time in his career, but again, he lost at this stage, 3–5 to Steve James.

Several last-64 finishes followed from 1990 to 1992, and during the 1992/1993 season, he played in only three tournaments. Having lost to the young prospect Stephen Lee in the UK Championship, he entered the 1993 World Championship, but was eliminated 1–5 in qualifying by Darren Guest. Concluding the season ranked 114th, he was relegated from the tour immediately thereafter.
