= Graham Cripsey =

English former professional snooker player (born 1954)

Graham Cripsey (born 8 December 1954) is a former professional snooker player and wall of death rider. He turned pro as a snooker player aged 27 and was active as a professional from 1982 to 1996.

== Early life ==
Graham Cripsey was born in Skegness, England, on 8 December 1954. With his parents and his brother Gary, Cripsey ran a "wall of death" business in Skegness. He started training to ride the wall aged 13, and took it up when he was 15, continuing for 14 years. He fell five times during this time, and lost part of his left thumb in one of the incidents.

== Snooker career ==
Cripsey was the first player to be coached by Derek Hill - known as Big Del. Hill discovered Ronnie O'Sullivan in the early 1990s and coached many top players, such as Graeme Dott.

Cripsey began at the professional tournaments in the 1982–83 season and reached the final qualifying round of the 1983 World Snooker Championship following a win over Dennis Hughes. In 1984-85 he reached the second round at the International Open and the UK Championship. He was then ranked 89th in the world rankings. In the 1985–86 season he twice reached the last 32, in the Classic and in the UK Championship, beating Cliff Wilson and John Spencer, two players from the top 24 in the world rankings. In 1987, Bill Werbeniuk was defeated at the British Open in the last 32. By this point his ranking had risen to 48. In 1987-88 the Englishman achieved his biggest ranking success: He reached another round of 32 at the British Open. Although maintaining a 46th ranking, victories over Barry West and Eugene Hughes showed that he could compete with top players. 1988-89 started badly for him but at The Classic he defeated Steve Longworth, to reach the last 32.

Cripsey was no longer in the top 64 world rankings by 1990. In a tournament with a special format, the snooker shoot-out in which a single frame was played, he reached the quarter-finals and lost by 62 points to 66 against Alan McManus. He also slipped out of the top 100. In 1991 the professional tour was opened for everyone. Although he was able to remain professional, he had to play preliminary rounds, before the last 128. Overall he won only four games that year. In a match against Sean Storey at the Asian Open, one frame ended with the score 93-92 to Storey, the score boosted by foul points from Storey making a record 13 consecutive misses. The 185 points was a new record for combine points in a snooker frame, a record which stood until 2012 (when Peter Lines beat Dominic Dale 108-84 for 192 points total). Cripsey lost the match 1–5.

The following year, Cripsey managed only one victory in a minor-ranking tournament, and fell from the top 128. In 1993/94 he had to play more pre-qualifying rounds. He did not reach the last 128. The following year he played only two tournaments and in 1995-96 only the pre-qualification of the World Snooker Championship. After that, he gave up the professional tournaments at age 41.

== Later career ==
By the mid-90s he had returned to the family business. In 2004 he gave up the steep wall for reasons of age and lack of successors.
