= Vic Harris (snooker player) =

English snooker player (1945–2015)

Personal information
- Born: 16 August 1945 Westcliffe-on-Sea, Essex
- Died: 10 March 2015 (aged 69)

Sport
- Country: England
- Sport: Snooker
- Professional: 1981–1992, 1998/1999
- Highest ranking: 63
- Best ranking finish: Last 32 (x3)

Vic Harris (16 August 1945 – 10 March 2015) was an English snooker player who was born in Westcliffe-on-Sea, Essex, and turned professional in 1981. He identified Steve Davis as a future world champion at the age of 12, and was the first to spot the talent of Tony Drago when Drago won the Maltese amateur title in 1984.

Harris competed in the professional UK Championship in 1981, 1982, and 1987. He won the English Amateur Championship in 1981.

The Vic Harris Snooker League in Essex is named after him.

Harris was interviewed by the BBC during the 2013 World Snooker Championship. He said he had his right ear removed due to cancer, but continued to play regularly in Essex. Harris talked about his role in helping to develop the games of Steve Davis and Stuart Bingham.

== Death and tributes ==
Harris died on 10 March 2015, aged 69, following a long battle with cancer.

Throughout the day many snooker professionals and those involved in snooker paid tribute to Harris. World Snooker Chairman Barry Hearn tweeted: "Sad news that Vic Harris died today. My heartfelt condolences to his family and friends. A great player and Romford hero who will be missed. Life is strange. If Vic Harris wasn't at Romford, Steve Davis wouldn't have played there and I wouldn't have met Steve. If I hadn't met Steve then there may have never been a Matchroom and the sporting world it helped to create. Who knows how fate works. RIP Vic and thanks."

Jason Ferguson, WPBSA chairman, said, "Very sad to hear news of Vic Harris, a lovely man who shared our love for snooker all his life, our deepest sympathy to family and friends." Barry Pinches, said, "Really sad to hear that Vic Harris has passed away today. Ex snooker pro and top coach but above all a true gent and lovely guy. RIP Vic."
