= Joe O'Boye =

Irish snooker player

Personal information
- Born: 6 March 1960 (age 66) Leicester, England

Sport
- Country: Ireland
- Sport: Snooker
- Professional: 1980–1990

Joe O’Boye (born 6 March 1960) is an Irish former professional snooker player. He represented the Republic of Ireland at the 1988 Snooker World Cup. He was the winner of the 1980 English Amateur Championship.

== Career ==
O’Boye had three applications for professional status declined by the World Professional Billiards and Snooker Association after his 1980 English Amateur Championship victory before they relented and he was accepted. In October 1985 he made his television debut at the 1985 Rothmans Grand Prix held at the Hexagon in Reading against Jimmy White, losing 4-5 but with White winning the last three frames. Before the game O’Boye was unable to find his dress suit and was still undressed four minutes before play; White offered to lend him his spare, before it was eventually found.

O’Boye reached the quarter-final at the 1987 International Open where he played Stephen Hendry following wins against Martin Clark, Kirk Stevens and Robby Foldvari. O’Boye defeated Danny Fowler and Barry West to reach the last 32 of the Snooker World Championship in 1989. He lost 10–6 to Silvino Francisco at The Crucible. O’Boye had previously reached the last 32 of the UK Championship in 1988, where he lost to Dennis Taylor.

O’Boye would often practice at a snooker club in Kings Cross along with Peter Ebdon and Tony Drago. Drago beat O’Boye 9-0 in 81 minutes at the 1990 UK Championship. O’Boye was said to have been a significant influence in terms of his break-building abilities on the likes of Drago and Ebdon, as well as Jimmy White who was considered a drinking buddy of O’Boye and their escapades together "tended to involve an inordinate amount of alcohol" although O’Boye was later said to have remarked "I don’t regret anything. You’re only young once, and you can’t buy youth." O’Boye's behaviour at the 1990 Rothmans Grand Prix in Reading in October 1990 caused him to be banned from the 1991 Mercantile Credit Classic. Further charges of abusive behaviour towards sponsors and match officials during the 1990 UK Championship in Preston and the Benson and Hedges satellite tournament in Glasgow caused further suspensions to include the 1991 World Snooker Championships.
