= Steve Longworth =

English snooker player (1948–2021)

Steven Longworth
Personal information
- Born: 27 July 1948 Blackburn, Lancashire, England
- Died: 10 October 2021 (aged 73)

Sport
- Country: England
- Sport: Snooker
- Professional: 1984–1995
- Highest ranking: 30 (1987–1988)
- Best ranking finish: Last 16 (x5)

Steve Longworth (27 July 1948 – 10 October 2021) was an English professional snooker player.

== Career ==
Born in 1948 in Blackburn, Longworth was a member of the Benarth Club in Blackburn that won the Lancashire team title in 1971, alongside Phil Hollings, Dennis Taylor and Jim Meadowcroft. He only played in local leagues until the late 1970s, when he became established as a leading amateur player in the country. He turned professional in 1984 after beating Wayne Jones in the final of the English Amateur Championship.

He lost his first match at the International Open of that year 4–5 to Steve Newbury, but reached the last 16 of the 1985 Classic, where he recorded wins over David Taylor and Neal Foulds, before losing 3–5 to Cliff Thorburn. He best Jimmy White 9-5 to reach the semi-final of the 1985 English Professional Championship, where Tony Knowles defeated him 9–6.

On his second season on the tour he broke into the top-32 of the world rankings. He went on to reach the last 16 of the 1986 UK Championship, losing 6–9 to John Parrott, the 1987 Snooker World Championship, where he beat Kirk Stevens 10–4 before falling 7–13 to the young Stephen Hendry, and the 1988 Canadian Masters, losing 0–5 to Jimmy White.

Longworth also registered ten last-32 finishes in ranking events, the last coming at the 1989 British Open, where he was defeated 1–5 by Parrott. Following this, he dropped out of the top 64 during the 1990–91 season. Longworth retired from professional snooker in 1995, at the age of 46 years-old.

== Personal life ==
Longworth began playing snooker with his father Harold. He was married to Madelaine, Longworth had two daughters, Sarah and Patricia, and three grandchildren. He died on 9 October 2021 in Blackburn, at the age of 73 years-old, having been diagnosed with cancer at the beginning of that year. Tributes were led by former practise partner Dennis Taylor.
