= Steve Newbury =

British snooker player

Personal information
- Born: April 21, 1956 (age 70)

Sport
- Country: Wales
- Sport: Snooker
- Professional: 1984–1997, 1998–1999
- Highest ranking: 19 (1988–1990)
- Best ranking finish: Semi-final (x1)

Steve Newbury (born 21 April 1956) is a former Welsh professional snooker player from Neath.

== Career ==
=== Amateur career ===
He started playing snooker in Neath. As an amateur, he reached the final of the Welsh Amateur Championship in 1978, where he was defeated in the final by Alwyn Lloyd. On his way to the final he defeated Terry Griffiths, a fateful win that encouraged Griffiths to turn professional as he could no longer qualify for the World Amateur Championship, and within 12 months Griffiths was the world professional champion having won as a qualifier. Newbury won the 1979 National Pairs Championship (with Cliff Wilson), and the 1980 Welsh Amateur Championship. At the 1980 World Amateur Snooker Championship, he was eliminated by Jimmy White in the quarter-finals.

=== Professional career ===
Newbury turned professional in 1984. In his first professional tournament he reached the last-16 of the 1984 International Open.

He was a quarter-finalist at the 1987 Grand Prix, a run which included a 5-0 whitewash of Cliff Thorburn, before losing to Dennis Taylor. He was runner-up in the 1987 Welsh Professional Championship, defeated 7-9 by Doug Mountjoy; and reached the semi-finals of the 1988 Classic, losing 2–9 to Steve Davis.

He qualified for the 1989 World Snooker Championship with a win over Nigel Gilbert but was defeated by defending champion and eventual winner, Steve Davis, 5-10 in the first round. He qualified for The Crucible again for the 1990 World Snooker Championship with a win over Nigel Bond, but lost a deciding frame against Mike Hallett in the first-round, 9-10. He reached a high ranking of 19th in 1989/1990. He beat Les Dodd to qualify for the 1991 World Snooker Championship, but suffered another first round exit as he was defeated 5-10 by Canadian Alain Robidoux. He finished the season with his world ranking at number 23.

== Personal life ==
Prior to turning professional he worked as a furnace operator in a cast-iron foundry and as a process operator in an oil refinery. He had two sons with his wife Kathryn.
