= Dave Martin (snooker player) =

English snooker player

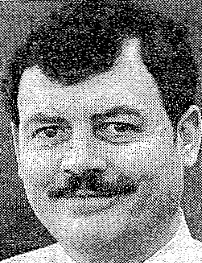
- Martin in 1988

Personal information
- Born: 9 May 1948 (age 78) Wheatley Hill

Sport
- Country: England
- Sport: Snooker
- Professional: 1980–1995
- Highest ranking: 24 (1981/1982)
- Best ranking finish: Quarter-final (x1)

Dave Martin (born 9 May 1948) is a retired English snooker player. He became a professional player in 1980, and later reached the semi-finals at the 1981 International Open. He was runner-up to Steve Davis at the 1984 International Masters.

== Career ==
Martin was born in Wheatley Hill on 9 May 1948. He was the runner-up in the English Amateur Championship in both 1979 and 1980.

turned professional in 1980, by defeating Eugene Hughes 9–6 in the final of the 1980 Professional Ticket Event, and reached the first round of the World Championship the same season, losing 4–10 to Bill Werbeniuk. The next season, he reached the semi-final of the International Open, defeating Bill Werbeniuk 5–2, Eddie Charlton 5–2, and Graham Miles 5–1, before losing 1–9 to Dennis Taylor. He followed this up by beating Eddie Sinclair 9–7 to qualify for the UK Championship, where he lost in the first round to Alex Higgins. He also qualified for the World Championship in 1982, once again losing in the first round, this time to Graham Miles 5–10.

The following season, Martin reached the first round of the Pro Players Tournament, losing 3–5 to John Spencer. He then reached the first round of the 1982 UK Championship, losing again in the first round to Higgins by the same scoreline as the previous year. He then qualified for the 1983 World Championship, eliminating Murdo MacLeod 10–7 in the final qualifying round. At the Crucible Theatre, he lost in the first round 4–10 to Bill Werbeniuk.

Martin began the following season by qualifying again for the International Open, beating Patsy Fagan 5–0 in the final qualifying round. In the first round, he defeated Alex Higgins 5–2, before losing 0–5 to Doug Mountjoy. He also reached the first round of the UK Championship, however he lost 4–9 in the first round to Terry Griffiths. At the 1984 International Masters he reached the three-player final group, and finished as reunner-up to Steve Davis. In the 1984–85 he qualified for the Grand Prix, losing to Tony Meo 4–5 in the first round. He also qualified for the British Open, where he beat Ray Reardon 5–4 in the first round, before losing 4–5 to Dene O'Kane. He lost 8–10 in the final qualifying round for the World Championship against Dene O'Kane.

The following season, Martin did not progress beyond the first round in any tournament; he did however qualify for the Grand Prix and the British Open, losing to Silvino Francisco and Steve Davis respectively. He qualified for the 1986 World Snooker Championship where he made his last appearance at the Crucible, losing 3–10 in the first round to Joe Johnson, the eventual winner of the tournament.

Martin reached the quarter-finals of the Mercantile Credit Classic in 1988, beating Doug Mountjoy 5–4, and Jimmy White 5–2, before losing 1–5 against Tony Knowles. His last appearance in the main stages of a tournament came at the 1991 UK Championship, where he lost in the first round 3–9 to Jimmy White.
