= Barry West =

English snooker player (1958–2022)

Personal information
- Born: 24 October 1958 Wickersley, Rotherham, South Yorkshire
- Died: 15 December 2022 (aged 64)

Sport
- Country: England
- Sport: Snooker
- Professional: 1985–1997
- Highest ranking: 21 (1989–1990)
- Best ranking finish: Quarter-final (x3)

Barry West (24 October 1958 – 15 December 2022) was an English professional snooker player.

== Biography ==
Barry West was born on 24 October 1958, in Wickersley, England, and became a professional snooker player in 1985. At the end of his first season he achieved a world ranking of number 30. The following season, he defeated former world champion John Spencer in the final round of qualifying to make his debut at The Crucible at the 1987 World Snooker Championship. In the first round he faced another former world champion, as Ray Reardon beat him 10-5.

The following season, he reached the semi-final of the English Professional Championships, recording a break of 134 to win the top break prize. He returned to The Crucible for the 1988 World Snooker Championship, but lost in the first round 10-8 to Doug Mountjoy.

During his career he reached the quarter-finals of ranking tournaments three times. At the 1985 UK Championship, West lost 1–9 in the quarter-finals to Steve Davis; the 1988 International Open finished in a 2–5 loss to Jimmy White, and the UK Championship of that year ended for West with a 5–9 defeat to Terry Griffiths. He also reached the semi-finals of the 1988 English Professional Championship, losing 6–9 to Neal Foulds.

West finished the 1996/1997 season ranked 179th, and was relegated from the tour as only the top 64 players automatically retained their professional status.

West made a return to competition in qualifying for the 2010 World Snooker Championship, but was defeated in his first match, 1–5 by Del Smith. He entered the 2012 World Seniors Championship, winning three matches to qualify for the last 16, where he lost 2–0 to Dene O'Kane. He also participated in the 2013 event, but lost his first match in the qualifying competition 1–2 to Les Dodd.

West died in December 2022, at the age of 64.
