= 1991 Dubai Classic =

Dubai Classic
Tournament information
- Dates: 5–11 October 1991
- Venue: Al Nasr Stadium
- City: Dubai
- Country: United Arab Emirates
- Organisation: WPBSA
- Format: Ranking event
- Total prize fund: £214,000
- Winner's share: £40,000
- Highest break: John Parrott (ENG) (132)

Final
- Champion: John Parrott (ENG)
- Runner-up: Tony Knowles (ENG)
- Score: 9–3

The 1991 Dubai Duty Free Classic was a professional ranking snooker tournament that took place between 5 and 11 October 1991 at the Al Nasr Stadium in Dubai, United Arab Emirates.

John Parrott won the tournament, defeating Tony Knowles 9–3 in the final.

== Main draw ==
Last 64; Best of 9 frames
(England) John Parrott	5
(England) Peter Ebdon	1
(Wales) Mark Bennett	5
(England) Mark Rowing	2
(England) Dean Reynolds	5
(Scotland) Murdo MacLeod	3
(New Zealand) Dene O'Kane	5
(England) Steve Prest	4
(England) David Roe	5
(Wales) Wayne Jones	3
(England) Rod Lawler	5
(Wales) Doug Mountjoy	4
(Wales) Darren Morgan	5
(England) Mike Hallett	3
(England) Jim Chambers	5
(Australia) Eddie Charlton	2
(Wales) Paul Davies	5
(England) Gary Wilkinson	2
(Canada) Kirk Stevens	5
(Wales) Steve Newbury	3
(England) Nigel Gilbert	5
(Canada) Alain Robidoux	3
(India) Amrik Cheema	5
(England) John Virgo	3
(England) Martin Clark	5
(England) Ken Owers	1
(South Africa) Silvino Francisco	5
(England) Craig Edwards	4
(England) Steve Davis	5
(England) Jonathan Birch	2
(Republic of Ireland) Ken Doherty	5
(Wales) Cliff Wilson	3
(England) Tony Knowles	5
(Canada) Gary Natale	4
(Republic of Ireland) Eugene Hughes	5
(Canada) Bob Chaperon	2
(England) Neal Foulds	5
(England) Les Dodd	3
(England) Danny Fowler	5
(England) Bob Harris	3
(Northern Ireland) Dennis Taylor	5
(Northern Ireland) Jason Prince	1
(Thailand) James Wattana	5
(England) Tony Meo	4
(England) Nigel Bond	5
(England) Brian Morgan	3
(England) Jimmy White	5
(England) Jason Whittaker	0
(England) Steve James	5
(Canada) Cliff Thorburn	3
(England) Brian Rowswell	5
(Malta) Tony Drago	3
(Northern Ireland) Alex Higgins	5
(England) Willie Thorne	2
(Wales) Terry Griffiths	5
(Wales) Colin Roscoe	2
(England) Joe Johnson	5
(England) Andy Hicks	4
(Canada) Brady Gollan	5
(England) Tony Jones	2
(South Africa) Peter Francisco	5
(England) David Taylor	4
(Australia) Warren King	5
(Scotland) Stephen Hendry	3

Last 32; Best of 9 frames
(England) John Parrott	5
(Wales) Mark Bennett	2
(England) Dean Reynolds	5
(New Zealand) Dene O'Kane	4
(England) David Roe	5
(England) Rod Lawler	3
(Wales) Darren Morgan	5
(England) Jim Chambers	1
(Wales) Paul Davies	5
(Canada) Kirk Stevens	0
(England) Nigel Gilbert	5
(India) Amrik Cheema	4
(England) Martin Clark	5
(South Africa) Silvino Francisco	3
(England) Steve Davis	5
(Republic of Ireland) Ken Doherty	4
(England) Tony Knowles	5
(Republic of Ireland) Eugene Hughes	2
(England) Neal Foulds	5
(England) Danny Fowler	1
(Northern Ireland) Dennis Taylor	5
(Thailand) James Wattana	2
(England) Nigel Bond	5
(England) Jimmy White	0
(England) Steve James	5
(England) Brian Rowswell	1
(Northern Ireland) Alex Higgins	5
(Wales) Terry Griffiths	1
(England) Joe Johnson	5
(Canada) Brady Gollan	2
(South Africa) Peter Francisco	5
(Australia) Warren King	4

Last 16; Best of 9 frames
(England) John Parrott	5
(England) Dean Reynolds	1
(England) David Roe	5
(Wales) Darren Morgan	4
(Wales) Paul Davies	5
(England) Nigel Gilbert	0
(England) Martin Clark	5
(England) Steve Davis	3
(England) Tony Knowles	5
(England) Neal Foulds	0
(Northern Ireland) Dennis Taylor	5
(England) Nigel Bond	4
(England) Steve James	5
(Northern Ireland) Alex Higgins	2
(England) Joe Johnson	5
(South Africa) Peter Francisco	4

Quarter-finals; Best of 9 frames
(England) John Parrott	5
(England) David Roe	2
(Wales) Paul Davies	5
(England) Martin Clark	2
(England) Tony Knowles	5
(Northern Ireland) Dennis Taylor	2
(England) Steve James	5
(England) Joe Johnson	2

Semi-finals; Best of 11 frames
(England) John Parrott	6
(Wales) Paul Davies	0
(England) Tony Knowles	6
(England) Steve James	2

Final; Best of 17 frames
(England) John Parrott	9
(England) Tony Knowles	3
