= 1994 International Open =

Tournament information
- Dates: 13–19 February 1994
- Venue: Bournemouth International Centre
- City: Bournemouth
- Country: England
- Organisation: WPBSA
- Format: Ranking event
- Winner's share: £27,000

Final
- Champion: John Parrott (ENG)
- Runner-up: James Wattana (THA)
- Score: 9–5

The 1994 International Open was a professional ranking snooker tournament that took place between 13 and 19 February 1994 at the Bournemouth International Centre in Bournemouth, England.

John Parrott won the title by defeating James Wattana 9–5 in the final. The defending champion Stephen Hendry was defeated by Alan McManus in the quarter-finals.

== Main draw ==
Last 64; Best of 9 frames
(Scotland) Stephen Hendry	5
(South Africa) Silvino Francisco	0
(England) Nick Terry	5
(England) Joe Johnson	2
(Republic of Ireland) Ken Doherty	5
(Wales) Dominic Dale	4
(Malta) Tony Drago	5
(England) Danny Fowler	1
(Northern Ireland) Dennis Taylor	5
(England) Andy Hicks	0
(England) Tony Knowles	5
(England) Anthony Hamilton	4
(Scotland) Alan McManus	5
(England) Dave Finbow	4
(New Zealand) Dene O'Kane	5
(England) Dave Harold	4
(Thailand) James Wattana	5
(Australia) Robby Foldvari	1
(England) Ian Brumby	5
(Wales) Doug Mountjoy	4
(England) David Roe	5
(Finland) Robin Hull	2
(England) Mike Hallett	5
(England) Mark King	4
(England) Steve James	5
(England) Steve Meakin	3
(Wales) Anthony Davies	5
(England) Mark Johnston-Allen	2
(England) Steve Davis	5
(England) Rod Lawler	0
(England) Tony Jones	5
(Northern Ireland) Martin O'Neill	3
(England) Jimmy White	5
(Scotland) Drew Henry	1
(Wales) Mark Bennett	5
(Republic of Ireland) Stephen Murphy	4
(Wales) Darren Morgan	5
(Northern Ireland) Alex Higgins	2
(Northern Ireland) Joe O'Boye	5
(Canada) Alain Robidoux	4
(England) Neal Foulds	5
(England) Jamie Woodman	1
(Scotland) Jamie Burnett	5
(England) Peter Ebdon	4
(Wales) Terry Griffiths	5
(Northern Ireland) Jason Prince	3
(England) Mick Price	5
(England) Gary Ponting	2
(England) Willie Thorne	5
(England) Steve Judd	3
(Northern Ireland) Joe Swail	5
(England) Ian Graham	4
(Canada) Cliff Thorburn	5
(England) Martin Clark	1
(England) Gary Wilkinson	5
(Wales) Cliff Wilson	1
(England) Nigel Bond	5
(Wales) Wayne Jones	3
(England) Jason Ferguson	5
(Northern Ireland) Jack McLaughlin	3
(England) Dean Reynolds	5
(England) Nigel Gilbert	2
(England) John Parrott	5
(Malta) Joe Grech	2

Last 32; Best of 9 frames
(Scotland) Stephen Hendry	5
(England) Nick Terry	0
(Republic of Ireland) Ken Doherty	4
(Malta) Tony Drago	5
(Northern Ireland) Dennis Taylor	2
(England) Tony Knowles	5
(Scotland) Alan McManus	5
(New Zealand) Dene O'Kane	3
(Thailand) James Wattana	5
(England) Ian Brumby	1
(England) David Roe	5
(England) Mike Hallett	4
(England) Steve James	5
(Wales) Anthony Davies	2
(England) Steve Davis	5
(England) Tony Jones	1
(England) Jimmy White	5
(Wales) Mark Bennett	0
(Wales) Darren Morgan	5
(Northern Ireland) Joe O'Boye	2
(England) Neal Foulds	5
(Scotland) Jamie Burnett	2
(Wales) Terry Griffiths	5
(England) Mick Price	3
(England) Willie Thorne	4
(Northern Ireland) Joe Swail	5
(Canada) Cliff Thorburn	0
(England) Gary Wilkinson	5
(England) Nigel Bond	3
(England) Jason Ferguson	5
(England) Dean Reynolds	1
(England) John Parrott	5

Last 16; Best of 9 frames
(Scotland) Stephen Hendry	5
(Malta) Tony Drago	2
(England) Tony Knowles	1
(Scotland) Alan McManus	5
(Thailand) James Wattana	5
(England) David Roe	3
(England) Steve James	3
(England) Steve Davis	5
(England) Jimmy White	5
(Wales) Darren Morgan	2
(England) Neal Foulds	5
(Wales) Terry Griffiths	4
(Northern Ireland) Joe Swail	5
(England) Gary Wilkinson	4
(England) Jason Ferguson	4
(England) John Parrott	5

Quarter-finals; Best of 9 frames
(Scotland) Stephen Hendry	0
(Scotland) Alan McManus	5
(Thailand) James Wattana	5
(England) Steve Davis	4
(England) Jimmy White	5
(England) Neal Foulds	2
(Northern Ireland) Joe Swail	4
(England) John Parrott	5

Semi-finals; Best of 11 frames
(Scotland) Alan McManus	3
(Thailand) James Wattana	6
(England) Jimmy White	4
(England) John Parrott	6

Final; Best of 17 frames
(Thailand) James Wattana	5
(England) John Parrott	9
