= 1993 UK Championship =

1993 Royal Liver Assurance UK Championship
Tournament information
- Dates: 12–28 November 1993
- Venue: Preston Guild Hall
- City: Preston
- Country: England
- Organisation: WPBSA
- Format: Ranking event
- Total prize fund: £375,000
- Winner's share: £70,000
- Highest break: David Roe (ENG) (141)

Final
- Champion: Ronnie O'Sullivan (ENG)
- Runner-up: Stephen Hendry (SCO)
- Score: 10–6

The 1993 UK Championship (officially the 1993 Royal Liver Assurance UK Championship) was a professional ranking snooker tournament that took place at the Guild Hall in Preston, England. The event started on 12 November 1993, and the televised stages were shown on BBC between 20 and 28 November 1993. The highest break of the tournament was a 141 made by David Roe.

Ronnie O'Sullivan became the youngest winner of a ranking event at the age of 17 years and 358 days by defeating Stephen Hendry 10–6 in the final; as of 2026 this record still stands. This was the first of O'Sullivan's record eight titles at the tournament.

== Prize fund ==
The breakdown of prize money for this year is shown below:

- Total prize money: £375,000
- Winner: £70,000
- Runner-up: £35,000
- Semi-final: £18,500
- Quarter-final: £10,325
- Last 16: £5,250
- Last 32: £3,000
- Last 64: £1,850
- Last 96: £650
- Last 128: £475
- High break (TV stages): £3,000
- High break (Pre-TV stages): £1,500
- Maximum break (TV stage): £20,000
- Maximum break (Pre-TV stage): £5,000

== Main draw ==
=== Top half ===
Round 1 (Last 64); Best of 17 frames
1	(England) Jimmy White	9
105	(Republic of Ireland) David McDonnell	6
25	(Northern Ireland) Joe Swail	5
54	(England) Andy Hicks	9
24	(Wales) Mark Bennett	8
48	(Wales) Tony Chappel	9
10	(Wales) Darren Morgan	9
143	(England) Darren Clarke	7
14	(England) Neal Foulds	3
50	(England) Dave Harold	9
28	(England) Dean Reynolds	9
44	(England) Jonathan Birch	1
26	(England) Joe Johnson	7
89	(England) Craig Edwards	9
8	(Wales) Terry Griffiths	9
91	(England) Mark Davis	8
6	(Scotland) Alan McManus	5
57	(England) Ronnie O'Sullivan	9
31	(England) Mark Johnston-Allen	8
52	(England) Nigel Gilbert	9
32	(England) Jason Ferguson	8
138	(Northern Ireland) Terry Murphy	9
11	(Republic of Ireland) Ken Doherty	9
53	(England) Nick Terry	3
15	(Northern Ireland) Dennis Taylor	9
61	(Northern Ireland) Alex Higgins	3
20	(Malta) Tony Drago	9
221	(Scotland) Jamie Burnett	5
19	(England) Mike Hallett	9
77	(England) Troy Shaw	5
4	(England) Steve Davis	9
33	(South Africa) Silvino Francisco	2

Round 2 (Last 32); Best of 17 frames
1	(England) Jimmy White	9
54	(England) Andy Hicks	3
48	(Wales) Tony Chappel	5
10	(Wales) Darren Morgan	9
50	(England) Dave Harold	7
28	(England) Dean Reynolds	9
89	(England) Craig Edwards	6
8	(Wales) Terry Griffiths	9
57	(England) Ronnie O'Sullivan	9
52	(England) Nigel Gilbert	8
138	(Northern Ireland) Terry Murphy	5
11	(Republic of Ireland) Ken Doherty	9
15	(Northern Ireland) Dennis Taylor	7
20	(Malta) Tony Drago	9
19	(England) Mike Hallett	4
4	(England) Steve Davis	9

Round 3 (Last 16); Best of 17 frames
1	(England) Jimmy White	7
10	(Wales) Darren Morgan	9
28	(England) Dean Reynolds	6
8	(Wales) Terry Griffiths	9
57	(England) Ronnie O'Sullivan	9
11	(Republic of Ireland) Ken Doherty	5
20	(Malta) Tony Drago	3
4	(England) Steve Davis	9

Quarter-finals; Best of 17 frames
10	(Wales) Darren Morgan	9
8	(Wales) Terry Griffiths	5
57	(England) Ronnie O'Sullivan	9
4	(England) Steve Davis	6

Semi-finals; Best of 17 frames
10	(Wales) Darren Morgan	5
57	(England) Ronnie O'Sullivan	9

=== Bottom half ===
Round 1 (Last 64); Best of 17 frames
3	(England) John Parrott	9
285	(England) Garry Baldrey	4
23	(England) Tony Knowles	9
56	(Wales) Steve Newbury	4
18	(Canada) Alain Robidoux	9
35	(England) Danny Fowler	4
16	(England) David Roe	9
82	(England) Steve Campbell	6
9	(England) Nigel Bond	9
83	(England) Karl Broughton	5
30	(Wales) Doug Mountjoy	9
47	(Wales) Cliff Wilson	8
22	(New Zealand) Dene O'Kane	9
46	(England) Les Dodd	5
7	(England) Willie Thorne	8
64	(Scotland) Drew Henry	9
5	(Thailand) James Wattana	9
104	(England) Jim Chambers	1
21	(England) Peter Ebdon	9
163	(England) Darryn Walker	3
29	(England) Tony Jones	9
43	(Wales) Wayne Jones	4
13	(England) Steve James	9
45	(England) Rod Lawler	8
12	(England) Martin Clark	9
34	(Australia) Eddie Charlton	2
27	(England) Mick Price	9
42	(Northern Ireland) Jason Prince	6
17	(England) Gary Wilkinson	3
49	(England) Anthony Hamilton	9
2	(Scotland) Stephen Hendry	9
100	(Republic of Ireland) Fergal O'Brien	5

Round 2 (Last 32); Best of 17 frames
3	(England) John Parrott	9
23	(England) Tony Knowles	2
18	(Canada) Alain Robidoux	7
16	(England) David Roe	9
9	(England) Nigel Bond	9
30	(Wales) Doug Mountjoy	5
22	(New Zealand) Dene O'Kane	4
64	(Scotland) Drew Henry	9
5	(Thailand) James Wattana	9
21	(England) Peter Ebdon	3
29	(England) Tony Jones	9
13	(England) Steve James	3
12	(England) Martin Clark	9
27	(England) Mick Price	4
49	(England) Anthony Hamilton	5
2	(Scotland) Stephen Hendry	9

Round 3 (Last 16); Best of 17 frames
3	(England) John Parrott	9
16	(England) David Roe	3
9	(England) Nigel Bond	9
64	(Scotland) Drew Henry	6
5	(Thailand) James Wattana	9
29	(England) Tony Jones	2
12	(England) Martin Clark	5
2	(Scotland) Stephen Hendry	9

Quarter-finals; Best of 17 frames
3	(England) John Parrott	9
9	(England) Nigel Bond	5
5	(Thailand) James Wattana	7
2	(Scotland) Stephen Hendry	9

Semi-finals; Best of 17 frames
3	(England) John Parrott	3
2	(Scotland) Stephen Hendry	9

== Final ==
Final: Best of 19 frames. Referee: John Williams; The Guild Hall, Preston, England, 28 November 1993.
Ronnie O'Sullivan (57); England	10–6	Stephen Hendry (2); Scotland
First session: 78–45 (78), 108–23 (103), 8–132 (132), 64–73, 123–0 (121), 61–60, 85–35 (52), 72–32; Second session: 69–42, 16–74, 6–113 (67), 68–44 (62), 16–97 (65), 102–27 (73), 1–77 (76), 85–0 (85)
121	Highest break	132
2	Century breaks	1
7	50+ breaks	4

== Century breaks ==
- 141 – David Roe
- 140 – Stuart Pettman
- 138, 120 – John Parrott
- 136 – Nick Walker
- 135 – Jim Chambers
- 132, 131, 123, 114, 111, 109, 109, 108, 107, 106 – Stephen Hendry
- 131 – Mike Hallett
- 131 – John Shilton
- 129, 128, 106, 105 – Darren Morgan
- 126, 115, 103 – Martin O'Neill
- 126, 110, 106 – Steve Davis
- 122, 121, 118, 114, 113, 107, 105, 103 – Ronnie O'Sullivan
- 122, 120, 106 – Tony Drago
- 121, 114 – Ken Doherty
- 120, 115, 110 – Anthony Hamilton
- 119 – Richy McDonald
- 116, 109, 100 – Dave Harold
- 116 – Alex Borg
- 114, 106 – Joe Canny
- 112 – Wilfred Dijkstra
- 112 – Daniel Haenga
- 111 – Spencer Dunn
- 109, 103, 101 – Jimmy White
- 109 – Tony Jones
- 108 – Mark Whatley
- 106 – Matthew Couch
- 106 – Paul McPhillips
- 106 – Paul Tanner
- 105 – Troy Shaw
- 102, 101 – Nigel Bond
- 102 – Martin Clark
- 102 – Anthony Harris
- 102 – Sonic Multani
- 102 – James Wattana
- 101 – Gay Burns
- 100 – Dean Reynolds
