= 1992 UK Championship =

Tournament information
- Dates: 13–29 November 1992
- Venue: Preston Guild Hall
- City: Preston
- Country: England
- Organisation: WPBSA
- Format: Ranking event
- Winner's share: £70,000
- Highest break: Peter Ebdon (ENG) (147)

Final
- Champion: Jimmy White (ENG)
- Runner-up: John Parrott (ENG)
- Score: 16–9

The 1992 UK Championship was a professional ranking snooker tournament that took place at the Guild Hall in Preston, England. The event started on 13 November 1992 and the televised stages were shown on BBC between 21 and 29 November 1992.

It was the last UK Final to be staged over two days and to use the best of 31 frames format. The highest break of the televised stages was 136 made by James Wattana and the same of the non-televised stages was 147 made by Peter Ebdon.

In a repeat of the previous year's final Jimmy White won his first and only UK Championship title by defeating defending champion John Parrott 16–9 in a reverse of the result in 1991, winning back-to-back ranking events after victory in the Grand Prix a month earlier.

== Prize fund ==
The breakdown of prize money for this year is shown below:

- Winner: £70,000
- Runner-up: £35,000
- High break: £5,000

== Main draw ==
=== Top half ===
Last 64; Best of 17 frames
1	(England) John Parrott	9
59	(Canada) Kirk Stevens	3
21	(Republic of Ireland) Ken Doherty	9
47	(England) Peter Ebdon	4
19	(England) Dean Reynolds	9
75	(Scotland) Chris Small	6
9	(England) Nigel Bond	9
46	(England) Ian Graham	5
12	(England) Martin Clark	9
(Hong Kong) Frankie Chan	3
18	(New Zealand) Dene O'Kane	9
85	(England) Anthony Hamilton	8
30	(England) Danny Fowler	3
53	(Northern Ireland) Joe Swail	9
5	(England) Neal Foulds	3
74	(Scotland) Billy Snaddon	9
6	(Wales) Terry Griffiths	7
62	(England) Jason Ferguson	9
22	(England) Tony Jones	8
124	(Scotland) John Rea	9
24	(Malta) Tony Drago	9
61	(England) Brian Morgan	6
16	(Wales) Darren Morgan	9
94	(Wales) Anthony Davies	3
10	(England) Steve James	9
56	(Republic of Ireland) Stephen Murphy	3
27	(Wales) Mark Bennett	6
41	(Northern Ireland) Jason Prince	9
25	(South Africa) Peter Francisco	8
55	(Republic of Ireland) Eugene Hughes	9
4	(England) Steve Davis	9
34	(Wales) Wayne Jones	1

Last 32; Best of 17 frames
1	(England) John Parrott	9
21	(Republic of Ireland) Ken Doherty	5
19	(England) Dean Reynolds	9
9	(England) Nigel Bond	7
12	(England) Martin Clark	1
18	(New Zealand) Dene O'Kane	9
53	(Northern Ireland) Joe Swail	9
74	(Scotland) Billy Snaddon	7
62	(England) Jason Ferguson	9
124	(Scotland) John Rea	3
24	(Malta) Tony Drago	6
16	(Wales) Darren Morgan	9
10	(England) Steve James	9
41	(Northern Ireland) Jason Prince	4
55	(Republic of Ireland) Eugene Hughes	0
4	(England) Steve Davis	9

Last 16; Best of 17 frames
1	(England) John Parrott	9
19	(England) Dean Reynolds	2
18	(New Zealand) Dene O'Kane	3
53	(Northern Ireland) Joe Swail	9
62	(England) Jason Ferguson	3
16	(Wales) Darren Morgan	9
10	(England) Steve James	4
4	(England) Steve Davis	9

Quarter-finals; Best of 17 frames
1	(England) John Parrott	9
53	(Northern Ireland) Joe Swail	3
16	(Wales) Darren Morgan	2
4	(England) Steve Davis	9

Semi-finals; Best of 17 frames
1	(England) John Parrott	9
4	(England) Steve Davis	5

=== Bottom half ===
Last 64; Best of 17 frames
3	(England) Jimmy White	9
255	(England) Dylan Leary	1
32	(England) David Roe	9
44	(England) Jonathan Birch	5
31	(England) Mark Johnston-Allen	5
119	(England) Mark Davis	9
15	(England) Willie Thorne	9
43	(Canada) Jim Wych	1
11	(Northern Ireland) Dennis Taylor	9
50	(England) Nigel Gilbert	7
17	(England) Mike Hallett	9
(England) Stephen Lee	4
26	(Wales) Doug Mountjoy	9
54	(Northern Ireland) Jack McLaughlin	2
7	(Thailand) James Wattana	9
72	(Northern Ireland) Alex Higgins	3
8	(England) Gary Wilkinson	9
192	(Republic of Ireland) Fergal O'Brien	6
23	(England) Joe Johnson	9
205	(England) Darren Clarke	8
29	(Australia) Eddie Charlton	9
(Thailand) Suriya Suwannasingh	7
13	(Scotland) Alan McManus	9
120	(England) Shaun Mellish	7
14	(Canada) Alain Robidoux	7
(England) Ronnie O'Sullivan	9
28	(South Africa) Silvino Francisco	6
33	(Wales) Cliff Wilson	9
20	(England) Tony Knowles	9
243	(England) Jason Wallace	6
2	(Scotland) Stephen Hendry	9
(Wales) Mark Williams	8

Last 32; Best of 17 frames
3	(England) Jimmy White	9
32	(England) David Roe	8
119	(England) Mark Davis	0
15	(England) Willie Thorne	9
11	(Northern Ireland) Dennis Taylor	3
17	(England) Mike Hallett	9
26	(Wales) Doug Mountjoy	1
7	(Thailand) James Wattana	9
8	(England) Gary Wilkinson	9
23	(England) Joe Johnson	1
29	(Australia) Eddie Charlton	3
13	(Scotland) Alan McManus	9
(England) Ronnie O'Sullivan	8
33	(Wales) Cliff Wilson	9
20	(England) Tony Knowles	5
2	(Scotland) Stephen Hendry	9

Last 16; Best of 17 frames
3	(England) Jimmy White	9
15	(England) Willie Thorne	4
17	(England) Mike Hallett	1
7	(Thailand) James Wattana	9
8	(England) Gary Wilkinson	7
13	(Scotland) Alan McManus	9
33	(Wales) Cliff Wilson	3
2	(Scotland) Stephen Hendry	9

Quarter-finals; Best of 17 frames
3	(England) Jimmy White	9
7	(Thailand) James Wattana	2
13	(Scotland) Alan McManus	9
2	(Scotland) Stephen Hendry	8

Semi-finals; Best of 17 frames
3	(England) Jimmy White	9
13	(Scotland) Alan McManus	7

== Final ==
Final: Best of 31 frames. Referee: Len Ganley; The Guild Hall, Preston, England, 28 and 29 November 1992.
Jimmy White (3); England	16–9	John Parrott (1); England
First session: 76–8 (54), 10–66, 77–0, 61–52, 85–36 (65), 49–44, 66–57 (53); Second session: 18–88 (87), 111–9 (110), 0–73 (72), 110–9 (50, 50), 29–66, 114–4 (66), 54–55; Third session: 95–10 (74), 95–28 (54), 0–126 (126), 79–0 (71), 29–81 (70), 77–6, 2–94 (90); Fourth session: 80–1 (74), 14–57, 73–54, 59–34
110	Highest break	126
1	Century breaks	1
10	50+ breaks	6

== Century breaks ==
All rounds

- 147, 117 – Peter Ebdon
- 145, 123, 117, 115, 103, 102 – Ronnie O'Sullivan
- 140 – Chris Scanlon
- 140 – Michael Valentine
- 136, 110 – James Wattana
- 132, 109, 104 – Steve James
- 132 – Paul Davies
- 130 – Darren Hackeson
- 129, 109 – Peter Francisco
- 128 – Dave Harold
- 126, 103, 103 – John Parrott
- 122, 100 – Darren Morgan
- 120, 119, 104, 103 – Alan McManus
- 119, 109 – Jimmy Michie
- 118, 118, 116, 109, 101 – Stephen Hendry
- 118 – Joe Canny
- 116, 115, 106, 105, 102 – Steve Davis
- 114 – Leigh Griffin
- 111 – John Giles
- 111 – Jimmy White
- 109 – Tony Drago
- 107 – Dominic Dale
- 107 – Noppadon Noppachorn
- 107 – Mark Williams
- 105 – Nick Dyson
- 105 – Will Jerram
- 105 – Wayne Jones
- 105 – Peter Lines
- 105 – Lee Richardson
- 105 – Gary Wilkinson
- 104 – Stephen Lee
- 104 – Alain Robidoux
- 103 – Garry Baldrey
- 102 – Phillip Seaton
- 101 – Dave Gilbert
- 101 – Dene O'Kane
- 101 – John Rees
- 100 – Mark Johnston-Allen
- 100 – Billy Snaddon
- 100 – Joe Swail
