= 1991 European Open (snooker) =

1991 Tulip European Open
Tournament information
- Dates: 11–16 March 1991
- Venue: Imax Centre
- City: Rotterdam
- Country: Netherlands
- Organisation: WPBSA
- Format: Ranking event
- Total prize fund: £200,000
- Winner's share: £35,000
- Highest break: Mark Johnston-Allen (ENG) (92)

Final
- Champion: Tony Jones (ENG)
- Runner-up: Mark Johnston-Allen (ENG)
- Score: 9–7

The 1991 European Open (officially the 1991 Tulip European Open) was a professional ranking snooker tournament, which took place between 11 and 16 March 1991 at the Imax Centre in Rotterdam, Netherlands.

Tony Jones won the tournament, defeating Mark Johnston-Allen 9–7 in the final.

== Prize fund ==
- Winner: £35,000
- Runner-up: £22,000
- Semi-final: £12,000
- Quarter-final: £6,000
- Last 16: £4,500
- Last 32: £1,500
- Last 64: £750
- Last 96: £250
- Total: £196,250

== Main draw ==
=== Top half ===
Last 64; Best of 9 frames
1	(England) John Parrott	3
40	(Wales) Darren Morgan	5
16	(Canada) Alain Robidoux	2
35	(England) Tony Jones	5
9	(England) Steve James	5
81	(Canada) Mario Morra	2
22	(Wales) Wayne Jones	3
109	(Scotland) Duncan Campbell	5
30	(Malta) Tony Drago	2
51	(England) Nigel Gilbert	5
10	(Northern Ireland) Dennis Taylor	5
56	(Scotland) Murdo MacLeod	2
28	(Wales) Cliff Wilson	5
53	(Republic of Ireland) Paddy Browne	2
7	(England) Mike Hallett	3
52	(Canada) Jim Wych	5
5	(Wales) Doug Mountjoy	5
46	(England) Robert Marshall	4
31	(Australia) Eddie Charlton	5
37	(England) Rex Williams	1
11	(England) Willie Thorne	5
33	(Wales) Mark Bennett	4
21	(England) Tony Knowles	5
82	(England) Barry Pinches	4
49	(Northern Ireland) Jack McLaughlin	w/o
97	(Northern Ireland) Alex Higgins	w/d
24	(South Africa) Peter Francisco	5
38	(England) Nigel Bond	3
25	(Canada) Bob Chaperon	3
54	(Canada) Brady Gollan	5
4	(England) Jimmy White	3
32	(Thailand) James Wattana	5

Last 32; Best of 9 frames
40	(Wales) Darren Morgan	1
35	(England) Tony Jones	5
9	(England) Steve James	5
109	(Scotland) Duncan Campbell	3
51	(England) Nigel Gilbert	3
10	(Northern Ireland) Dennis Taylor	5
28	(Wales) Cliff Wilson	5
52	(Canada) Jim Wych	4
5	(Wales) Doug Mountjoy	5
31	(Australia) Eddie Charlton	1
11	(England) Willie Thorne	5
21	(England) Tony Knowles	2
49	(Northern Ireland) Jack McLaughlin	4
24	(South Africa) Peter Francisco	5
54	(Canada) Brady Gollan	5
32	(Thailand) James Wattana	3

Last 16; Best of 9 frames
35	(England) Tony Jones	5
9	(England) Steve James	3
10	(Northern Ireland) Dennis Taylor	5
28	(Wales) Cliff Wilson	3
5	(Wales) Doug Mountjoy	5
11	(England) Willie Thorne	4
24	(South Africa) Peter Francisco	2
54	(Canada) Brady Gollan	5

Quarter-finals; Best of 9 frames
35	(England) Tony Jones	5
10	(Northern Ireland) Dennis Taylor	3
5	(Wales) Doug Mountjoy	2
54	(Canada) Brady Gollan	5

Semi-final; Best of 11 frames
35	(England) Tony Jones	6
54	(Canada) Brady Gollan	2

=== Bottom half ===
Last 64; Best of 9 frames
3	(England) Steve Davis	5
43	(Wales) Tony Chappel	1
19	(England) Gary Wilkinson	5
(England) Rod Lawler	3
15	(England) Tony Meo	5
(England) Chris Cookson	2
18	(Canada) Cliff Thorburn	5
86	(England) Nick Terry	3
27	(England) Barry West	2
61	(England) Craig Edwards	5
13	(England) Neal Foulds	5
71	(Canada) Marcel Gauvreau	2
26	(South Africa) Silvino Francisco	0
(Republic of Ireland) Ken Doherty	5
6	(Wales) Terry Griffiths	5
79	(England) Martin Smith	0
8	(England) Dean Reynolds	5
84	(England) Jon Wright	2
29	(England) Danny Fowler	4
(Northern Ireland) Jason Prince	5
12	(England) Martin Clark	5
78	(England) Paul Medati	3
23	(New Zealand) Dene O'Kane	5
(England) Jason Whittaker	4
20	(Wales) Steve Newbury	4
59	(England) Mark Johnston-Allen	5
14	(England) John Virgo	5
87	(England) Graham Cripsey	4
17	(England) Joe Johnson	5
80	(England) Andrew Cairns	3
2	(Scotland) Stephen Hendry	5
70	(Isle of Man) Tony Wilson	0

Last 32; Best of 9 frames
3	(England) Steve Davis	5
19	(England) Gary Wilkinson	0
15	(England) Tony Meo	3
18	(Canada) Cliff Thorburn	5
61	(England) Craig Edwards	4
13	(England) Neal Foulds	5
(Republic of Ireland) Ken Doherty	5
6	(Wales) Terry Griffiths	1
8	(England) Dean Reynolds	5
(Northern Ireland) Jason Prince	3
12	(England) Martin Clark	1
23	(New Zealand) Dene O'Kane	5
59	(England) Mark Johnston-Allen	5
14	(England) John Virgo	3
17	(England) Joe Johnson	0
2	(Scotland) Stephen Hendry	5

Last 16; Best of 9 frames
3	(England) Steve Davis	4
18	(Canada) Cliff Thorburn	5
13	(England) Neal Foulds	5
(Republic of Ireland) Ken Doherty	3
8	(England) Dean Reynolds	4
23	(New Zealand) Dene O'Kane	5
59	(England) Mark Johnston-Allen	5
2	(Scotland) Stephen Hendry	0

Quarter-finals; Best of 9 frames
18	(Canada) Cliff Thorburn	5
13	(England) Neal Foulds	3
23	(New Zealand) Dene O'Kane	2
59	(England) Mark Johnston-Allen	5

Semi-final; Best of 11 frames
18	(Canada) Cliff Thorburn	4
59	(England) Mark Johnston-Allen	6

=== Final ===
Final: Best of 17 frames. Referee: John Williams. Imax Centre, Rotterdam, Netherlands, 16 March 1991.
Tony Jones (35); England	9–7	Mark Johnston-Allen (59); England
Afternoon: 21-107 (92); 71-22; 48-61; 46-65 (51); 69-32 (59); 62-33; 61-4; 47-56; Evening: 73-40 (56); 52-64; 29-69; 52-63 (55); 84-50; 62-52 (Johnston-Allen 51); 80-1; 61-2
59	Highest break	92
0	Century breaks	0
2	50+ breaks	6

== Century breaks ==
=== Main stage centuries ===
- 136, 101 – Cliff Thorburn
- 133, 100 – Dennis Taylor
- 119 – Peter Francisco
- 116 – Nigel Gilbert
- 115, 100 – James Wattana
- 114 – Mark Johnston-Allen
- 105 – Tony Jones
- 105 – Dene O'Kane
- 105 – Dean Reynolds
- 102 – Steve James
- 102 – Darren Morgan
- 100 – Stephen Hendry

=== Qualifying stage centuries ===
- 132 – Ken Doherty
- 130 – Marcel Gauvreau
- 113 – James Wattana
- 109 – Eric Lawlor
- 103 – Nick Terry
- 100 – Rex Williams
