= 1997–98 snooker world rankings =

No. 1: Stephen Hendry
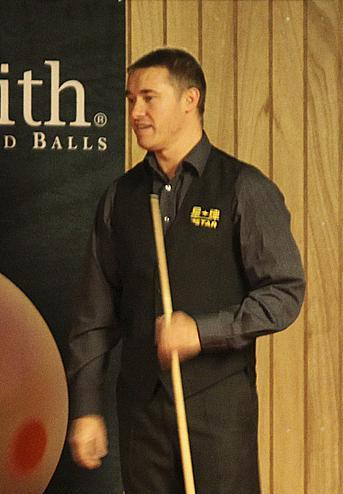

Personal information
- Born: January 13, 1969 (age 57)

Sport
- Country: Scotland
- Sport: Snooker
- Professional: 1985–2012, 2020–2024
- Highest ranking: 1

Preceded by 1996–97	1997–98	Succeeded by 1998–99

1997–98 snooker world rankings: The professional world rankings for the top snooker players in the 1997‍–‍98 season are listed below.

No. 2: John Higgins
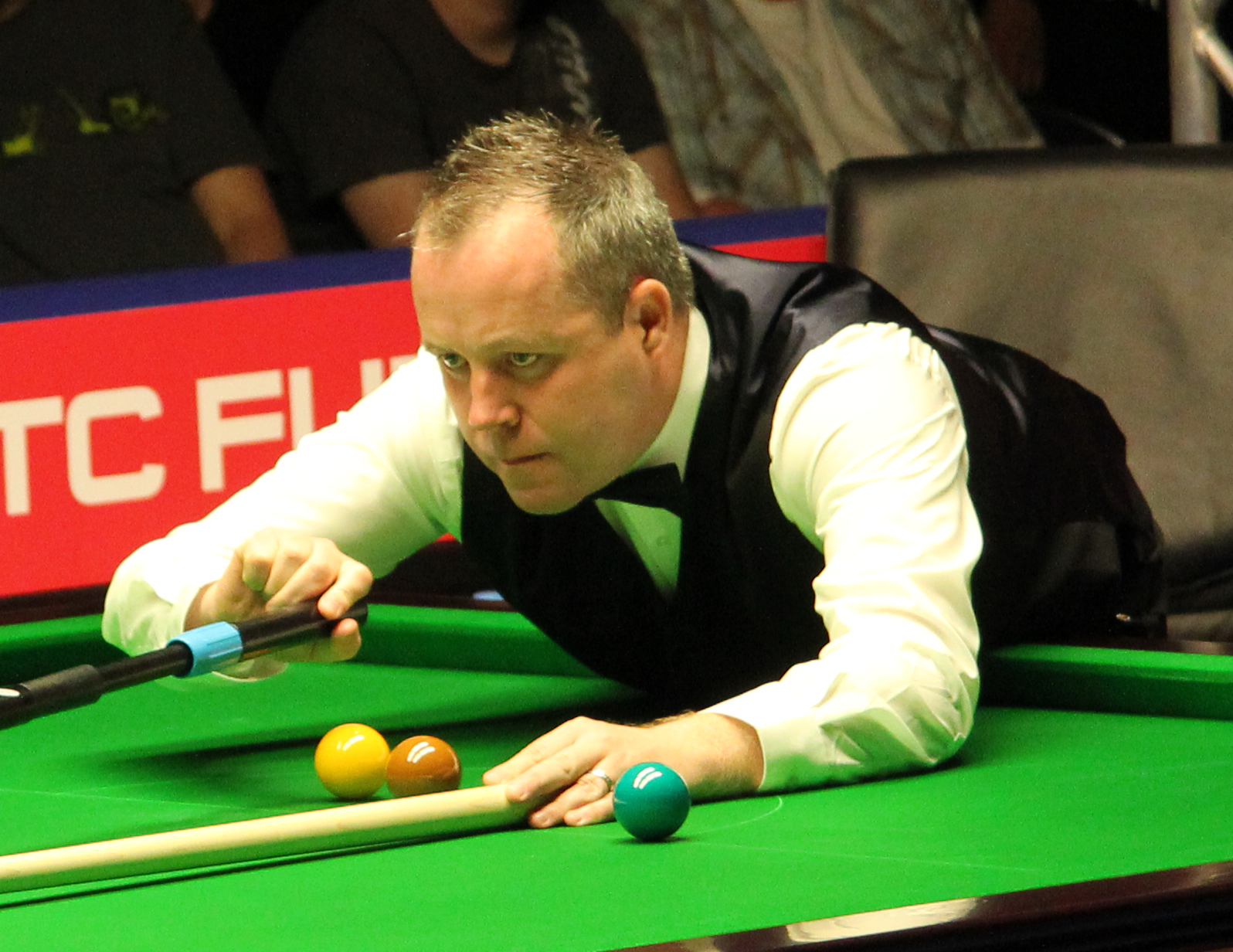

Personal information
- Born: May 18, 1975 (age 51)

Sport
- Country: Scotland
- Sport: Snooker
- Professional: 1992–present
- Highest ranking: 1

No. 3: Ken Doherty
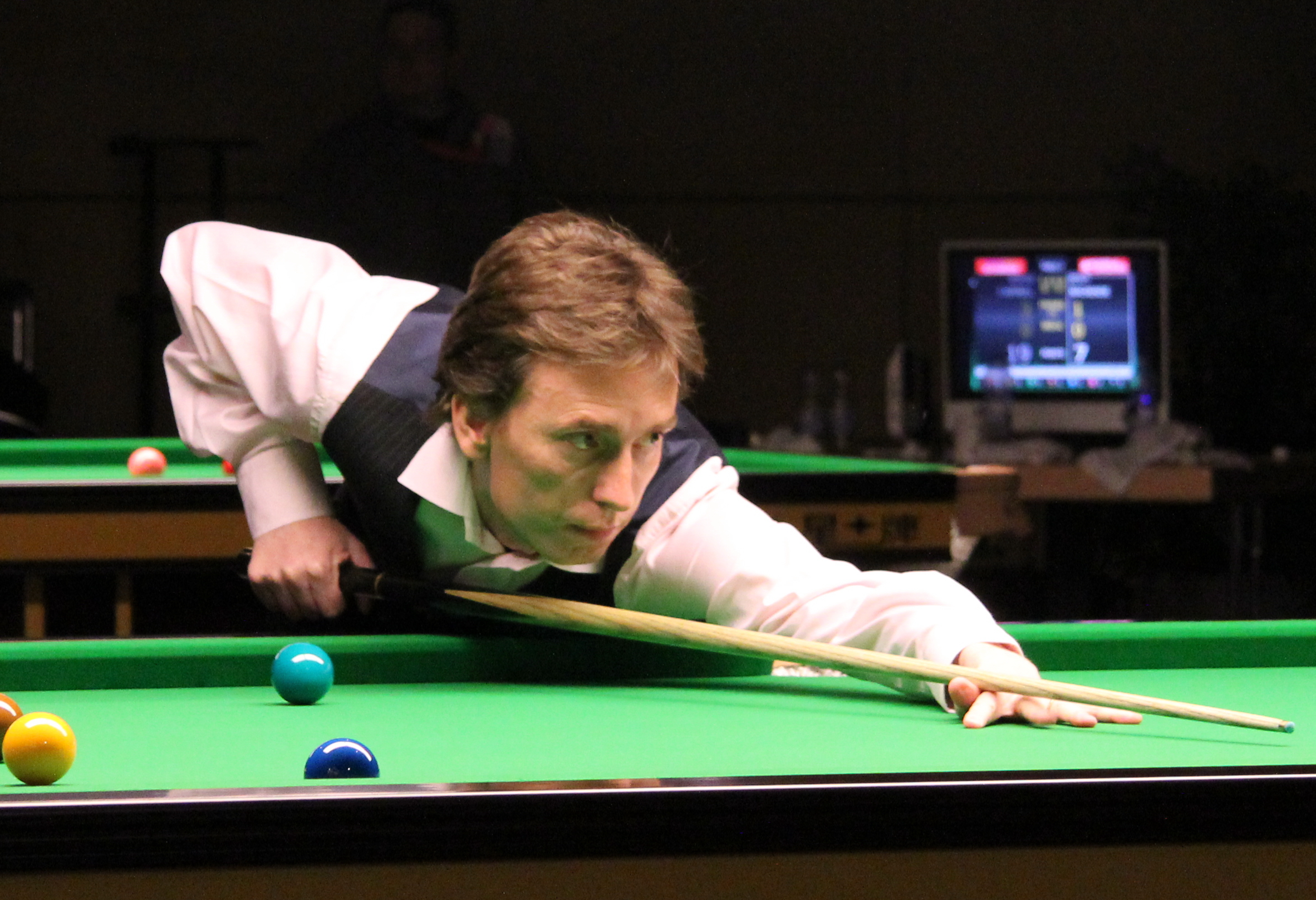

Personal information
- Born: September 17, 1969 (age 57)

Sport
- Country: Ireland
- Sport: Snooker
- Professional: 1990–present
- Highest ranking: 2

No.	Name	Nationality	Points
1	Stephen Hendry	Scotland	43,127
2	John Higgins	Scotland	30,867
3	Ken Doherty	Ireland	28,601
4	Mark Williams	Wales	27,485
5	Peter Ebdon	England	25,282
6	John Parrott	England	25,082
7	Ronnie O'Sullivan	England	24,217
8	Nigel Bond	England	22,182
9	Alain Robidoux	Canada	21,994
10	Alan McManus	Scotland	20,995
11	Tony Drago	Malta	19,959
12	James Wattana	Thailand	18,822
13	Steve Davis	England	18,654
14	Anthony Hamilton	England	17,004
15	Darren Morgan	Wales	16,423
16	Stephen Lee	England	16,079
17	Gary Wilkinson	England	15,913
18	Dave Harold	England	15,812
19	Andy Hicks	England	14,823
20	Mark King	England	14,240
21	Jimmy White	England	13,664
22	Joe Swail	Northern Ireland	13,481
23	Fergal O'Brien	Ireland	13,343
24	Steve James	England	13,204
25	Chris Small	Scotland	13,036
26	Rod Lawler	England	12,896
27	Martin Clark	England	12,744
28	Brian Morgan	England	12,693
29	Terry Murphy	Northern Ireland	12,644
30	Neal Foulds	England	12,570
31	Mick Price	England	12,372
32	Billy Snaddon	Scotland	12,266
33	Graeme Dott	Scotland	12,086
34	Dennis Taylor	Northern Ireland	12,042
35	Dene O'Kane	New Zealand	11,873
36	Willie Thorne	England	11,739
37	Jason Ferguson	England	11,691
38	Jamie Burnett	Scotland	11,635
39	David Finbow	England	11,498
40	Drew Henry	Scotland	10,945
41	Karl Broughton	England	10,943
42	Jason Prince	Northern Ireland	10,893
43	Paul Hunter	England	10,883
44	Euan Henderson	Scotland	10,810
45	Jonathan Birch	England	10,675
46	Tony Chappel	Wales	10,674
47	Mark Davis	England	10,390
48	Paul Davies	Wales	10,347
49	David Roe	England	10,083
50	Mark Bennett	Wales	9,975
51	Dean Reynolds	England	9,942
52	Joe Johnson	England	9,871
53	Matthew Stevens	Wales	9,870
54	Dominic Dale	Wales	9,830
55	Jimmy Michie	England	9,262
56	Michael Judge	Ireland	9,230
57	Nick Pearce	England	8,804
58	Wayne Jones	Wales	8,730
59	Shokat Ali	Pakistan	8,633
60	Tony Jones	England	8,565
61	Anthony Davies	Wales	8,428
62	Gerard Greene	Northern Ireland	8,405
63	Mark Flowerdew	England	8,185
64	Chris Scanlon	England	8,050
65	Stefan Mazrocis	England	8,040
66	Stephen Murphy	Ireland	7,989
67	Nick Walker	England	7,900
68	Nick Terry	England	7,826
69	Paul Wykes	England	7,825
70	Mark Johnston-Allen	England	7,692
71	Jamie Woodman	England	7,655
72	Tony Knowles	England	7,590
73	Graham Horne	Scotland	7,522
74	Paul McPhillips	Scotland	7,508
75	David McLellan	Scotland	7,453
76	Ian McCulloch	England	7,302
77	Karl Payne	England	7,290
78	Karl Burrows	England	7,267
79	Lee Walker	Wales	7,261
80	Bradley Jones	England	7,192
81	Antony Bolsover	England	7,170
82	Sean Storey	England	7,085
83	Barry Pinches	England	6,998
84	Darren Clarke	England	6,978
85	Gary Ponting	England	6,870
86	John Read	England	6,793
87	Stuart Pettman	England	6,720
88	Noppadon Noppachorn	Thailand	6,718
89	Mike Hallett	England	6,713
90	Peter Lines	England	6,710
91	Robert Milkins	England	6,697
92	Steve Judd	England	6,683
93	Jason Weston	England	6,680
94	Matthew Couch	England	6,663
95	Terry Griffiths	Wales	6,650
96	Yasin Merchant	India	6,540
97	Marcus Campbell	Scotland	6,468
98	Doug Mountjoy	Wales	6,457
99	Wayne Brown	England	6,454
100	Steve Newbury	Wales	6,369
101	Ian Brumby	England	6,329
102	Robin Hull	Finland	6,320
103	Nick Dyson	England	6,290
104	Quinten Hann	Australia	6,275
105	Lee Richardson	England	6,250
106	Stephen O'Connor	Ireland	6,203
107	Andrew Cairns	England	6,095
108	Darryn Walker	England	6,093
109	Oliver King	England	6,065
110	Jason Wallace	England	5,970
