= 1989 UK Championship =

1989 StormSeal UK Championship
Tournament information
- Dates: 17 November – 3 December 1989
- Venue: Preston Guild Hall
- City: Preston
- Country: England
- Organisation: WPBSA
- Format: Ranking event
- Total prize fund: £420,000
- Winner's share: £100,000
- Highest break: Stephen Hendry (SCO) (141)

Final
- Champion: Stephen Hendry (SCO)
- Runner-up: Steve Davis (ENG)
- Score: 16–12

The 1989 UK Championship (officially the 1989 StormSeal UK Championship) was a professional ranking snooker tournament that took place between 17 November and 3 December 1989 at the Guild Hall in Preston, England. StormSeal became the new sponsor of the UK Championship. The televised stages were shown live on the BBC from 25 November to the final.

Defending champion Doug Mountjoy lost in the last 64 against rookie player Joe O'Boye. The 1988 runner-up Stephen Hendry won the first of his five UK titles by defeating six-times champion Steve Davis 16–12 in the final, taking Hendry on course for the number one spot in the world snooker rankings. The highest break of the tournament was a 141 made by Hendry.

== Prize fund ==
The breakdown of prize money for this year is shown below:

- Winner: £100,000
- Runner-up: £48,000
- Semi-final: £N/A
- Quarter-final: £12,000
- Highest break: £8,000
- Total: £420,000

== Main draw ==
Last 64; Best of 17 frames
(Northern Ireland) Joe O'Boye	9
(Wales) Doug Mountjoy	8
(Canada) Brady Gollan	9
(Australia) Eddie Charlton	2
(Canada) Alain Robidoux	9
(England) Tony Meo	5
(South Africa) Silvino Francisco	9
(England) Steve Longworth	7
(England) Tony Knowles	9
(England) Robert Marshall	2
(Malta) Tony Drago	9
(England) Mark Johnston-Allen	7
(Wales) Terry Griffiths	9
(Australia) Warren King	4
(England) Tony Jones	9
(Wales) Steve Newbury	7
(Canada) Cliff Thorburn	9
(England) Mark Rowing	2
(South Africa) Peter Francisco	9
(England) Steve Campbell	5
(Canada) Kirk Stevens	9
(England) John Virgo	7
(Wales) Mark Bennett	9
(Republic of Ireland) Eugene Hughes	3
(England) Dean Reynolds	9
(England) Nick Terry	6
(Wales) Wayne Jones	9
(England) Danny Fowler	7
(Scotland) Stephen Hendry	9
(England) John Spencer	1
(England) Barry West	9
(England) David Taylor	5
(England) John Parrott	9
(Northern Ireland) Jack McLaughlin	2
(Canada) Bob Chaperon	9
(England) Mick Price	6
(England) Brian Morgan	9
(England) Steve James	4
(England) Gary Wilkinson	9
(England) David Roe	2
(England) Joe Johnson	9
(England) Jim Chambers	7
(England) Martin Clark	9
(England) Brian Rowswell	1
(England) Jimmy White	9
(England) Nigel Bond	3
(England) Neal Foulds	9
(England) Steve Meakin	1
(England) Mike Hallett	9
(Thailand) James Wattana	7
(New Zealand) Dene O'Kane	9
(England) Ian Graham	7
(Northern Ireland) Dennis Taylor	9
(England) Dave Gilbert	2
(England) Rex Williams	9
(Northern Ireland) Tommy Murphy	6
(England) Willie Thorne	9
(England) Paul Medati	3
(Northern Ireland) Alex Higgins	9
(England) Steve Duggan	7
(England) Steve Davis	9
(Wales) Tony Chappel	3
(Wales) Cliff Wilson	9
(Republic of Ireland) Paddy Browne	7

Last 32; Best of 17 frames
(Northern Ireland) Joe O'Boye	5
(Canada) Brady Gollan	9
(Canada) Alain Robidoux	9
(South Africa) Silvino Francisco	3
(England) Tony Knowles	9
(Malta) Tony Drago	7
(Wales) Terry Griffiths	9
(England) Tony Jones	8
(Canada) Cliff Thorburn	5
(South Africa) Peter Francisco	9
(Canada) Kirk Stevens	2
(Wales) Mark Bennett	9
(England) Dean Reynolds	9
(Wales) Wayne Jones	8
(Scotland) Stephen Hendry	9
(England) Barry West	1
(England) John Parrott	9
(Canada) Bob Chaperon	8
(England) Brian Morgan	6
(England) Gary Wilkinson	9
(England) Joe Johnson	9
(England) Martin Clark	6
(England) Jimmy White	9
(England) Neal Foulds	5
(England) Mike Hallett	9
(New Zealand) Dene O'Kane	0
(Northern Ireland) Dennis Taylor	9
(England) Rex Williams	2
(England) Willie Thorne	9
(Northern Ireland) Alex Higgins	3
(England) Steve Davis	9
(Wales) Cliff Wilson	3

Last 16; Best of 17 frames
(Canada) Brady Gollan	5
(Canada) Alain Robidoux	9
(England) Tony Knowles	7
(Wales) Terry Griffiths	9
(South Africa) Peter Francisco	3
(Wales) Mark Bennett	9
(England) Dean Reynolds	8
(Scotland) Stephen Hendry	9
(England) John Parrott	6
(England) Gary Wilkinson	9
(England) Joe Johnson	6
(England) Jimmy White	9
(England) Mike Hallett	9
(Northern Ireland) Dennis Taylor	6
(England) Willie Thorne	4
(England) Steve Davis	9

Quarter-finals; Best of 17 frames
(Canada) Alain Robidoux	2
(Wales) Terry Griffiths	9
(Wales) Mark Bennett	2
(Scotland) Stephen Hendry	9
(England) Gary Wilkinson	9
(England) Jimmy White	0
(England) Mike Hallett	5
(England) Steve Davis	9

Semi-finals; Best of 17 frames
(Wales) Terry Griffiths	7
(Scotland) Stephen Hendry	9
(England) Gary Wilkinson	8
(England) Steve Davis	9

Final; Best of 31 frames
(Scotland) Stephen Hendry	16
(England) Steve Davis	12

== Final ==
Final: Best of 31 frames. Referee: Len Ganley; The Guild Hall, Preston, England, 2 and 3 December 1989.
Stephen Hendry; Scotland	16–12	Steve Davis; England
First session: 71–52, 75–1, 95–20 (54), 67–50 (Davis 50), 24–73, 18–71 (60), 41–65; Second session: 89–30 (55), 117–6 (88), 89–19 (64), 2–96 (59), 41–69, 105–0 (75), 92–13 (91); Third session: 87–39, 17–75 (62), 37–95, 58–61, 77–33 (77), 29–80, 14–62, Fourth session: 123–13 (123), 112–10 (112), 70–16, 0–138 (138), 40–94, 97–22, 94–5 (66)
123	Highest break	138
2	Century breaks	1
10	50+ breaks	5

== Century breaks ==
- 141, 135, 123, 120, 112 – Stephen Hendry
- 139 – Andrew Cairns
- 138, 136, 126 – Steve Davis
- 127, 104 – Tony Knowles
- 127 – Terry Griffiths
- 127 – John Parrott
- 114 – Neal Foulds
- 114 – Danny Fowler
- 111 – David Taylor
- 110 – Mark Bennett
- 110 – Brady Gollan
- 108 – Mike Hallett
- 108 – Brian Morgan
- 107 – Ian Brumby
- 105 – Stephen Murphy
- 103 – Darren Morgan
- 102 – Alain Robidoux
- 101 – Joe Johnson
- 101 – Barry West
- 100 – Mark Johnston-Allen
