= 1995–96 snooker world rankings =

No. 1: Stephen Hendry
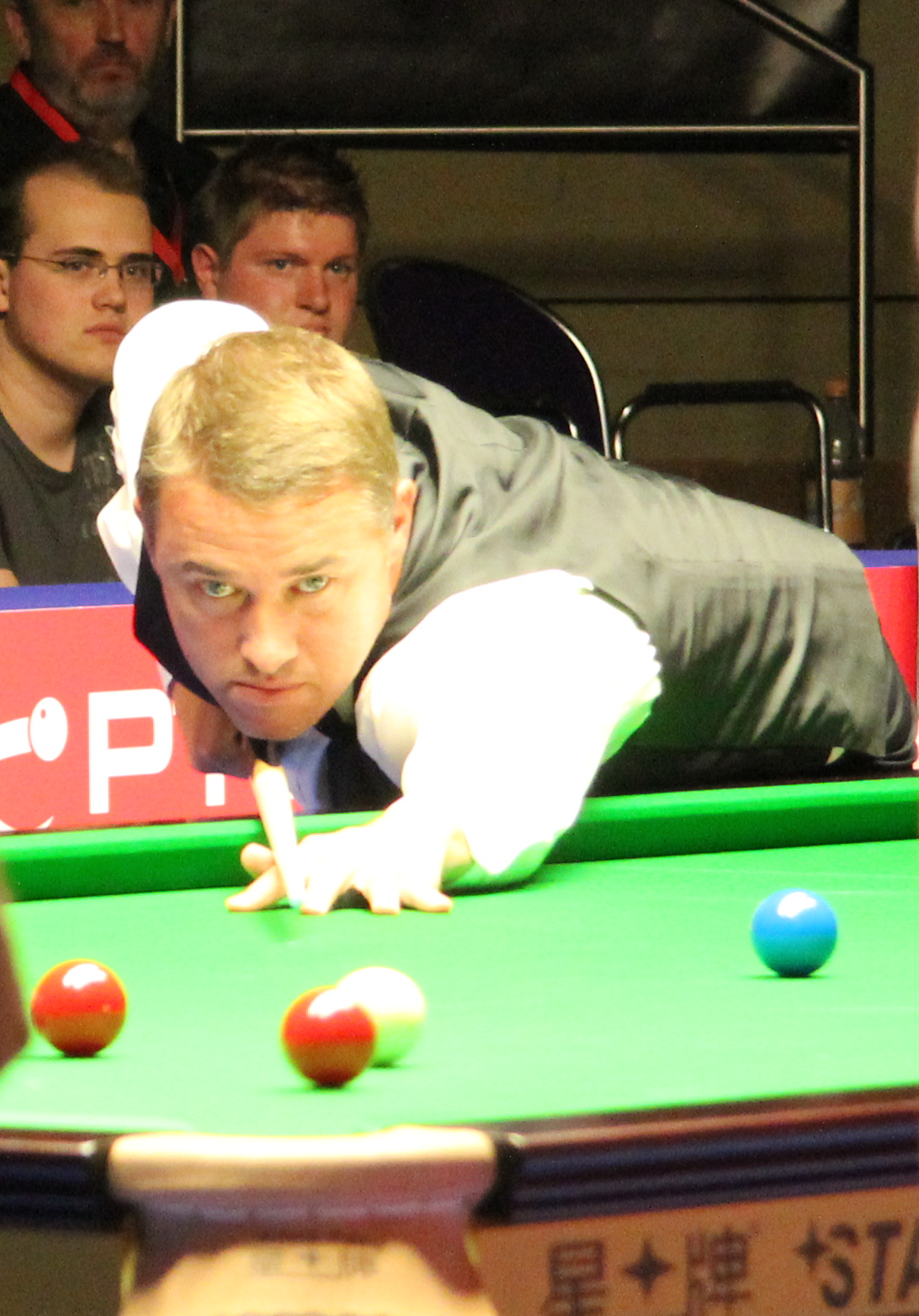

Personal information
- Born: January 13, 1969 (age 57)

Sport
- Country: Scotland
- Sport: Snooker
- Professional: 1985–2012, 2020–2024
- Highest ranking: 1

Preceded by 1994–95	1995–96	Succeeded by 1996–97

1995–96 snooker world rankings: The professional world rankings for the top 64 snooker players in the 1995‍–‍96 season are listed below.

No. 2: Steve Davis
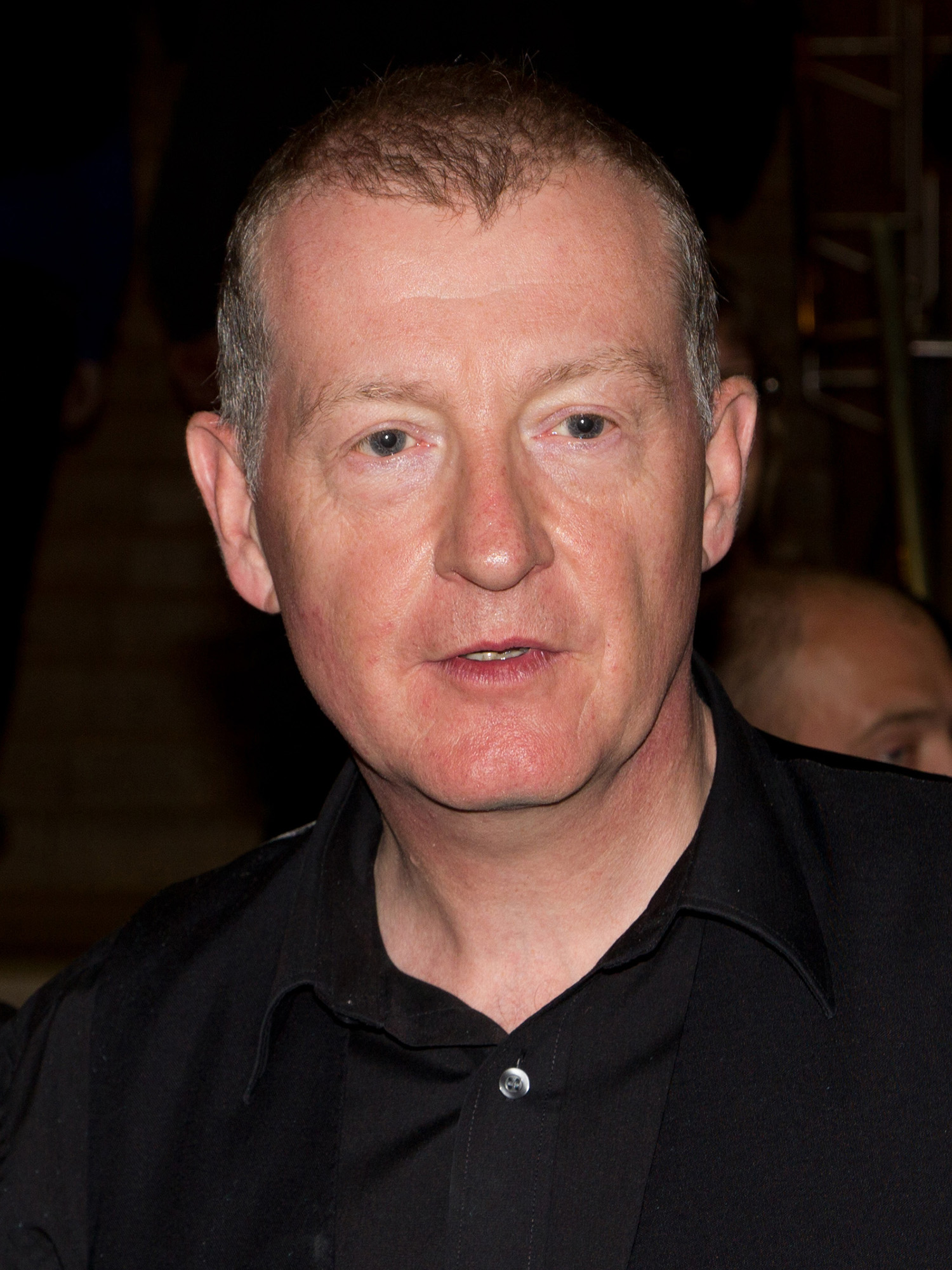

Personal information
- Born: August 22, 1957 (age 69)

Sport
- Country: England
- Sport: Snooker
- Professional: 1978–2014
- Highest ranking: 1

No. 3: Ronnie O'Sullivan
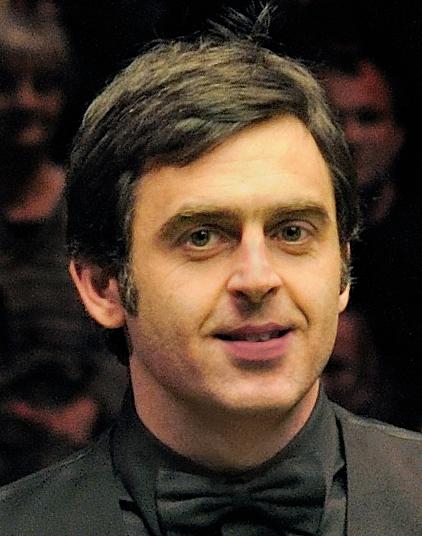

Personal information
- Born: December 5, 1975 (age 50)

Sport
- Country: England
- Sport: Snooker
- Professional: 1992–present
- Highest ranking: 1

No.	Name	Nationality	Points
1	Stephen Hendry	Scotland	50042
2	Steve Davis	England	42395
3	Ronnie O'Sullivan	England	41255
4	John Parrott	England	38939
5	James Wattana	Thailand	38904
6	Alan McManus	Scotland	36310
7	Jimmy White	England	36225
8	Darren Morgan	Wales	34970
9	Ken Doherty	Ireland	34507
10	Peter Ebdon	England	33645
11	John Higgins	Scotland	29962
12	Nigel Bond	England	29394
13	Dave Harold	England	28840
14	Tony Drago	Malta	25944
15	Terry Griffiths	Wales	25259
16	David Roe	England	24156
17	Andy Hicks	England	23775
18	Dene O'Kane	New Zealand	23654
19	Joe Swail	Northern Ireland	23169
20	Alain Robidoux	Canada	23127
21	Mick Price	England	22440
22	Martin Clark	England	21762
23	Gary Wilkinson	England	21498
24	Tony Knowles	England	21455
25	Willie Thorne	England	21196
26	Steve James	England	20699
27	Brian Morgan	England	20453
28	Neal Foulds	England	20290
29	Jason Ferguson	England	20183
30	Dean Reynolds	England	20057
31	Anthony Hamilton	England	19670
32	Dennis Taylor	Northern Ireland	19095
33	Billy Snaddon	Scotland	18720
34	Mike Hallett	England	18425
35	Drew Henry	Scotland	18095
36	Doug Mountjoy	Wales	17569
37	Stephen Lee	England	17447
38	Fergal O'Brien	Ireland	17285
39	Mark Williams	Wales	16815
40	Rod Lawler	England	16735
41	Cliff Thorburn	Canada	16337
42	Mark Bennett	Wales	16091
43	Tony Jones	England	16075
44	Nigel Gilbert	England	15667
45	Anthony Davies	Wales	15577
46	Nick Terry	England	15455
47	David Finbow	England	15282
48	Peter Francisco (Note: Peter Francisco was banned for five years.)	South Africa	15267
49	Mark Johnston-Allen	England	14852
50	Stephen Murphy	Ireland	14572
51	Alex Higgins	Northern Ireland	14350
52	Mark King	England	14305
53	Tony Chappel	Wales	14302
54	Mark Flowerdew	England	14300
55	Jason Prince	Northern Ireland	13897
56	Joe Johnson	England	13695
57	Wayne Jones	Wales	13660
58	Les Dodd	England	13525
59	Mark Davis	England	13495
60	Steve Newbury	Wales	13312
61	Terry Murphy	Northern Ireland	13130
62	Chris Small	Scotland	12740
63	Jonathan Birch	England	12727
64	Paul McPhillips	Scotland	12697
