= 1996–97 snooker world rankings =

No. 1: Stephen Hendry
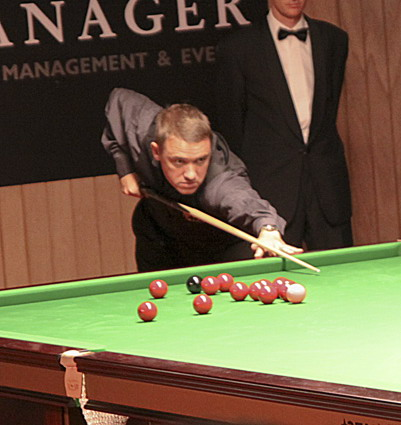

Personal information
- Born: January 13, 1969 (age 57)

Sport
- Country: Scotland
- Sport: Snooker
- Professional: 1985–2012, 2020–2024
- Highest ranking: 1

Preceded by 1995–96	1996–97	Succeeded by 1997–98

1996–97 snooker world rankings: The professional world rankings for the top 64 snooker players in the 1996‍–‍97 season are listed below.

No. 2: John Higgins
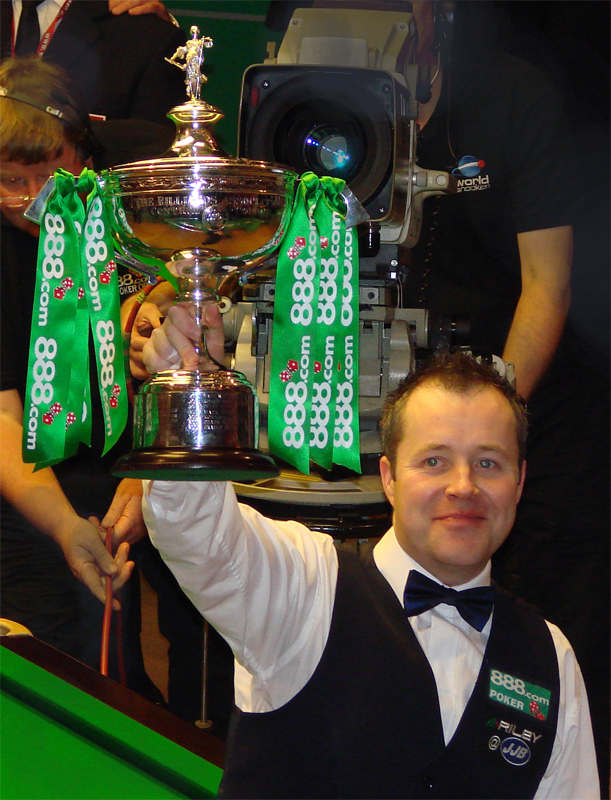

Personal information
- Born: May 18, 1975 (age 51)

Sport
- Country: Scotland
- Sport: Snooker
- Professional: 1992–present
- Highest ranking: 1

No. 3: Peter Ebdon
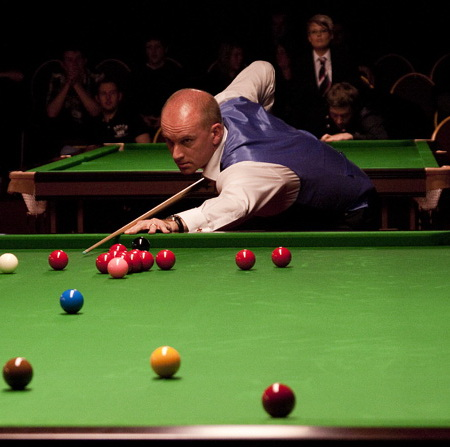

Personal information
- Born: August 27, 1970 (age 56)

Sport
- Country: England
- Sport: Snooker
- Professional: 1991–present
- Highest ranking: 3

No.	Name	Nationality	Points
1	Stephen Hendry	Scotland	36911
2	John Higgins	Scotland	32341
3	Peter Ebdon	England	28115
4	John Parrott	England	24339
5	Nigel Bond	England	22669
6	Alan McManus	Scotland	21492
7	Ken Doherty	Ireland	21161
8	Ronnie O'Sullivan	England	21007
9	Darren Morgan	Wales	19142
10	Steve Davis	England	18252
11	Dave Harold	England	18247
12	James Wattana	Thailand	17641
13	Jimmy White	England	16620
14	Alain Robidoux	Canada	16058
15	Tony Drago	Malta	16031
16	Mark Williams	Wales	15988
17	Joe Swail	Northern Ireland	15966
18	Andy Hicks	England	15371
19	Gary Wilkinson	England	15251
20	Rod Lawler	England	14565
21	Neal Foulds	England	14430
22	Anthony Hamilton	England	14415
23	Terry Griffiths	Wales	14226
24	Steve James	England	13699
25	Willie Thorne	England	13534
26	Dennis Taylor	Northern Ireland	13229
27	Dene O'Kane	New Zealand	13176
28	David Finbow	England	12946
29	Jason Ferguson	England	12839
30	Chris Small	Scotland	12788
31	Stephen Lee	England	12751
32	Mick Price	England	12101
33	Martin Clark	England	11840
34	David Roe	England	11804
35	Billy Snaddon	Scotland	11487
36	Fergal O'Brien	Ireland	11415
37	Anthony Davies	Wales	11288
38	Dean Reynolds	England	11019
39	Mark King	England	10943
40	Drew Henry	Scotland	10913
41	Terry Murphy	Northern Ireland	10855
42	Tony Knowles	England	10853
43	Mark Bennett	Wales	10786
44	Mark Johnston-Allen	England	10541
45	Tony Chappel	Wales	10358
46	Mike Hallett	England	10035
47	Joe Johnson	England	9785
48	Wayne Jones	Wales	9725
49	Brian Morgan	England	9719
50	Mark Flowerdew	England	9510
51	Karl Payne	England	9438
52	Nick Terry	England	9320
53	Paul Davies	Wales	9165
54	Jamie Burnett	Scotland	9115
55	Mark Davis	England	8950
56	Jason Prince	Northern Ireland	8864
57	Karl Broughton	England	8643
58	Graeme Dott	Scotland	8584
59	Doug Mountjoy	Wales	8445
60	Jimmy Michie	England	8410
61	Stephen Murphy	Ireland	8238
62	Euan Henderson	Scotland	8173
63	Tony Jones	England	8168
64	Jonathan Birch	England	8044
