= 1989 Asian Open =

Asian Open
Tournament information
- Dates: 17–27 August 1989
- Venue: Channel 12 Studios
- City: Bangkok
- Country: Thailand
- Organisation: WPBSA
- Format: Ranking event
- Total prize fund: £200,000
- Winner's share: £40,000
- Highest break: Stephen Hendry (SCO) (140)

Final
- Champion: Stephen Hendry (SCO)
- Runner-up: James Wattana (THA)
- Score: 9–6

The 1989 555 Asian Open was a professional ranking snooker tournament that took place between 17 and 27 August 1989 at the Channel 12 Studios in Bangkok, Thailand.

Stephen Hendry won the tournament by defeating James Wattana 9–6 in the final.

== Main draw ==
Last 64; Best of 9 frames
(Scotland) Stephen Hendry	5
(Wales) Tony Chappel	1
(Northern Ireland) Alex Higgins	5
(England) Dave Martin	3
(Wales) Wayne Jones	5
(England) Steve Campbell	3
(England) Dean Reynolds	5
(England) Mark Johnston-Allen	2
(England) Willie Thorne	5
(Republic of Ireland) Paddy Browne	4
(Canada) Brady Gollan	5
(Wales) Cliff Wilson	4
(England) John Virgo	5
(England) Bob Harris	4
(New Zealand) Dene O'Kane	5
(England) Bob Marshall	1
(England) Gary Wilkinson	5
(Australia) Eddie Charlton	1
(England) Tony Meo	5
(Scotland) John Rea	2
(South Africa) Peter Francisco	5
(England) Graham Cripsey	1
(Wales) Colin Roscoe	5
(England) Jimmy White	3
(England) Martin Clark	5
(England) Mick Price	2
(Australia) Warren King	5
(Canada) Bob Chaperon	2
(England) Barry West	5
(England) Jim Chambers	3
(England) Dave Gilbert	5
(Northern Ireland) Dennis Taylor	1
(Thailand) James Wattana	5
(England) David Taylor	1
(England) Mike Hallett	5
(England) Craig Edwards	0
(Wales) Doug Mountjoy	5
(Northern Ireland) Jack McLaughlin	3
(Republic of Ireland) Eugene Hughes	5
(England) Nick Terry	1
(South Africa) Silvino Francisco	5
(England) John Spencer	1
(England) Ian Graham	w/o
(England) John Parrott	w/d
(England) Tony Knowles	5
(England) Graham Miles	3
(England) Neal Foulds	5
(Canada) Jim Wych	2
(Wales) Terry Griffiths	5
(England) Andrew Cairns	2
(England) David Roe	5
(Wales) Darren Morgan	2
(Malta) Tony Drago	5
(Republic of Ireland) Joe O'Boye	3
(England) Joe Johnson	5
(England) Danny Fowler	4
(England) Tony Jones	5
(Canada) Cliff Thorburn	2
(England) Bill Oliver	5
(England) Rex Williams	4
(England) Steve Duggan	5
(Wales) Steve Newbury	3
(England) Steve James	5
(Wales) Mark Bennett	3

Last 32; Best of 9 frames
(Scotland) Stephen Hendry	5
(Northern Ireland) Alex Higgins	3
(Wales) Wayne Jones	5
(England) Dean Reynolds	2
(England) Willie Thorne	5
(Canada) Brady Gollan	1
(England) John Virgo	5
(New Zealand) Dene O'Kane	3
(England) Gary Wilkinson	5
(England) Tony Meo	2
(South Africa) Peter Francisco	5
(Wales) Colin Roscoe	4
(England) Martin Clark	5
(Australia) Warren King	3
(England) Barry West	5
(England) Dave Gilbert	3
(Thailand) James Wattana	5
(England) Mike Hallett	3
(Wales) Doug Mountjoy	5
(Republic of Ireland) Eugene Hughes	4
(South Africa) Silvino Francisco	5
(England) Ian Graham	4
(England) Tony Knowles	5
(England) Neal Foulds	3
(Wales) Terry Griffiths	5
(England) David Roe	3
(Malta) Tony Drago	5
(England) Joe Johnson	2
(England) Tony Jones	5
(England) Bill Oliver	1
(England) Steve Duggan	5
(England) Steve James	3

Last 16; Best of 9 frames
(Scotland) Stephen Hendry	5
(Wales) Wayne Jones	0
(England) Willie Thorne	5
(England) John Virgo	2
(England) Gary Wilkinson	5
(South Africa) Peter Francisco	4
(England) Martin Clark	5
(England) Barry West	0
(Thailand) James Wattana	5
(Wales) Doug Mountjoy	2
(South Africa) Silvino Francisco	5
(England) Tony Knowles	2
(Wales) Terry Griffiths	5
(Malta) Tony Drago	3
(England) Tony Jones	5
(England) Steve Duggan	3

Quarter-finals; Best of 9 frames
(Scotland) Stephen Hendry	5
(England) Willie Thorne	2
(England) Gary Wilkinson	5
(England) Martin Clark	0
(Thailand) James Wattana	5
(South Africa) Silvino Francisco	4
(Wales) Terry Griffiths	5
(England) Tony Jones	3

Semi-finals; Best of 9 frames
(Scotland) Stephen Hendry	5
(England) Gary Wilkinson	4
(Thailand) James Wattana	5
(Wales) Terry Griffiths	0

Final; Best of 17 frames
(Scotland) Stephen Hendry	9
(Thailand) James Wattana	6
