= 1991 British Open =

Snooker tournament

1991 Pearl Assurance British Open
Tournament information
- Dates: 17 February – 2 March 1991
- Venue: Assembly Rooms
- City: Derby
- Country: England
- Organisation: WPBSA
- Format: Ranking event
- Total prize fund: £400,000
- Winner's share: £75,000
- Highest break: Gary Wilkinson (ENG) (139)

Final
- Champion: Stephen Hendry (SCO)
- Runner-up: Gary Wilkinson (ENG)
- Score: 10–9

The 1991 British Open (officially the 1991 Pearl Assurance British Open) was a professional ranking snooker tournament, which took place between 17 February and 2 March 1991 at the Assembly Rooms in Derby, England.

Stephen Hendry won the tournament by defeating Gary Wilkinson 10–9 in the final. The defending champion Bob Chaperon was defeated in the last 64 by Franky Chan.

The qualifiers would mark the end of the playing career of veteran commentator Clive Everton.

== Main draw ==
Last 64; Best of 9 frames
(Scotland) Stephen Hendry	5
(Scotland) Alan McManus	2
(Hong Kong) Franky Chan	5
(Canada) Bob Chaperon	4
(England) Tony Meo	5
(England) Jason Smith	3
(Wales) Doug Mountjoy	5
(England) Rex Williams	1
(Northern Ireland) Dennis Taylor	5
(Canada) Gary Natale	4
(Canada) Brady Gollan	5
(New Zealand) Dene O'Kane	3
(England) Dean Reynolds	5
(Scotland) Duncan Campbell	2
(Australia) Warren King	5
(England) Steve James	3
(England) Steve Davis	5
(Republic of Ireland) Eugene Hughes	2
(England) Martin Clark	5
(England) Ian Graham	2
(Wales) Colin Roscoe	5
(England) John Parrott	3
(Australia) Eddie Charlton	5
(England) Steve Campbell	4
(England) Mike Hallett	5
(England) Mick Price	4
(England) Joe Johnson	5
(England) Chris Cookson	3
(Australia) Robby Foldvari	5
(Wales) Cliff Wilson	0
(England) Neal Foulds	w/o
(England) Jonathan Birch	w/d
(England) Gary Wilkinson	5
(Australia) John Campbell	2
(South Africa) Silvino Francisco	5
(Canada) Jim Wych	2
(Thailand) James Wattana	5
(England) David Roe	3
(Republic of Ireland) Stephen Murphy	5
(England) John Virgo	3
(England) Tony Jones	5
(Wales) Wayne Jones	3
(Canada) Kirk Stevens	5
(Wales) Steve Newbury	2
(England) Tony Knowles	5
(Northern Ireland) Jason Prince	3
(Wales) Mark Bennett	5
(England) Barry West	2
(England) Jimmy White	5
(Northern Ireland) Jack McLaughlin	2
(England) Danny Fowler	5
(Isle of Man) Tony Wilson	2
(Canada) Alain Robidoux	5
(Republic of Ireland) Ken Doherty	4
(South Africa) Peter Francisco	5
(England) David Taylor	2
(Wales) Terry Griffiths	5
(Malta) Joe Grech	0
(England) Robert Marshall	5
(England) Willie Thorne	4
(Malta) Tony Drago	5
(Wales) Darren Morgan	2
(England) Andrew Cairns	5
(Canada) Cliff Thorburn	4

Last 32; Best of 9 frames
(Scotland) Stephen Hendry	5
(Hong Kong) Franky Chan	0
(England) Tony Meo	5
(Wales) Doug Mountjoy	4
(Northern Ireland) Dennis Taylor	5
(Canada) Brady Gollan	0
(England) Dean Reynolds	5
(Australia) Warren King	3
(England) Steve Davis	5
(England) Martin Clark	2
(Wales) Colin Roscoe	5
(Australia) Eddie Charlton	1
(England) Mike Hallett	5
(England) Joe Johnson	2
(Australia) Robby Foldvari	5
(England) Neal Foulds	4
(England) Gary Wilkinson	5
(South Africa) Silvino Francisco	2
(Thailand) James Wattana	5
(Republic of Ireland) Stephen Murphy	2
(England) Tony Jones	5
(Canada) Kirk Stevens	3
(England) Tony Knowles	5
(Wales) Mark Bennett	1
(England) Jimmy White	5
(England) Danny Fowler	3
(Canada) Alain Robidoux	5
(South Africa) Peter Francisco	2
(Wales) Terry Griffiths	5
(England) Bob Marshall	3
(Malta) Tony Drago	5
(England) Andrew Cairns	3

Last 16; Best of 9 frames
(Scotland) Stephen Hendry	5
(England) Tony Meo	4
(Northern Ireland) Dennis Taylor	5
(England) Dean Reynolds	1
(England) Steve Davis	5
(Wales) Colin Roscoe	3
(England) Mike Hallett	5
(Australia) Robby Foldvari	2
(England) Gary Wilkinson	5
(Thailand) James Wattana	2
(England) Tony Jones	5
(England) Tony Knowles	3
(England) Jimmy White	5
(Wales) Terry Griffiths	3
(Canada) Alain Robidoux	5
(Malta) Tony Drago	0

Quarter-finals; Best of 9 frames
(Scotland) Stephen Hendry	5
(Northern Ireland) Dennis Taylor	1
(England) Steve Davis	5
(England) Mike Hallett	3
(England) Gary Wilkinson	5
(England) Tony Jones	3
(England) Jimmy White	5
(Canada) Alain Robidoux	3

Semi-finals; Best of 17 frames
(Scotland) Stephen Hendry	9
(England) Steve Davis	7
(England) Gary Wilkinson	9
(England) Jimmy White	8

Final; Best of 19 frames
(Scotland) Stephen Hendry	10
(England) Gary Wilkinson	9

== Final ==
Final: Best of 19 frames. Referee: Len Ganley; Assembly Rooms, Derby, England. 2 March 1991.
Stephen Hendry; Scotland	10–9	Gary Wilkinson; England
Afternoon: 87–4 (80), 83–5, 51–76 (Hendry 51), 7–65, 6–69 (69), 7–68, 47–79 (53), 69–67 (Wilkinson 67); Evening: 18–73 (71), 88–33, 80–25, 53–35, 20–102, 24–68, 83–15 (55), 135–0 (118), 65–27, 36–99 (91), 87–2
118	Highest break	91
1	Century breaks	0
4	50+ breaks	5
