= 1989 Hong Kong Open =

Hong Kong Open
Tournament information
- Dates: 7–13 August 1989
- Venue: Hong Kong Convention and Exhibition Centre
- Country: Hong Kong
- Organisation: WPBSA
- Format: Ranking event
- Winner's share: £40,000

Final
- Champion: Mike Hallett (ENG)
- Runner-up: Dene O'Kane (NZL)
- Score: 9–8

The 1989 Hong Kong Open was a professional ranking snooker tournament, that was held from 7–13 August 1989 at the Hong Kong Convention and Exhibition Centre, Hong Kong.

Mike Hallett won the tournament by defeating Dene O'Kane nine frames to eight in the final.

It was the last ranking event held in Hong Kong until the 2025 World Grand Prix over 35 years later.

== Main draw ==
Last 64; Best of 9 frames
(Wales) Steve Newbury	5
(England) Ray Edmonds	3
(England) John Parrott	5
(Scotland) Matt Gibson	3
(England) Gary Wilkinson	5
(England) Tony Knowles	2
(England) Barry Pinches	5
(South Africa) Silvino Francisco	4
(England) Martin Clark	5
(Australia) Robby Foldvari	4
(Canada) Bob Chaperon	5
(Scotland) Murdo MacLeod	3
(Northern Ireland) Dennis Taylor	5
(Wales) Colin Roscoe	3
(Canada) Brady Gollan	5
(Republic of Ireland) Eugene Hughes	3
(England) Tony Jones	5
(Canada) Cliff Thorburn	2
(England) David Roe	5
(England) Mick Price	4
(England) Ian Graham	5
(England) Rex Williams	1
(England) Steve James	5
(England) Mark Rowing	1
(Northern Ireland) Alex Higgins	5
(England) John Spencer	2
(England) Tony Meo	5
(England) Pat Houlihan	0
(New Zealand) Dene O'Kane	5
(England) Dave Martin	1
(Wales) Terry Griffiths	5
(Canada) Gino Rigitano	3
(England) Jimmy White	5
(Northern Ireland) Jack McLaughlin	2
(Australia) Eddie Charlton	5
(England) Dave Gilbert	2
(Wales) Doug Mountjoy	5
(England) Roger Bales	0
(Wales) Cliff Wilson	5
(England) Steve Duggan	1
(England) Neal Foulds	5
(England) Nigel Bond	2
(England) Jim Chambers	5
(England) Dean Reynolds	4
(England) Willie Thorne	5
(England) Ian Brumby	3
(Wales) Wayne Jones	5
(Australia) Warren King	1
(England) Mike Hallett	5
(England) Danny Fowler	2
(England) Barry West	5
(Scotland) John Rea	4
(England) John Virgo	5
(Canada) Jim Wych	4
(Canada) Marcel Gauvreau	5
(Malta) Tony Drago	0
(England) Les Dodd	5
(England) Joe Johnson	0
(England) Brian Morgan	5
(England) David Taylor	4
(Scotland) Stephen Hendry	5
(England) Jon Wright	4
(Canada) Alain Robidoux	5
(South Africa) Peter Francisco	3

Last 32; Best of 9 frames
(Wales) Steve Newbury	5
(England) John Parrott	2
(England) Gary Wilkinson	5
(England) Barry Pinches	4
(England) Martin Clark	5
(Canada) Bob Chaperon	2
(Northern Ireland) Dennis Taylor	5
(Canada) Brady Gollan	4
(England) Tony Jones	5
(England) David Roe	1
(England) Ian Graham	5
(England) Steve James	3
(Northern Ireland) Alex Higgins	5
(England) Tony Meo	4
(New Zealand) Dene O'Kane	5
(Wales) Terry Griffiths	4
(England) Jimmy White	5
(Australia) Eddie Charlton	2
(Wales) Doug Mountjoy	w/o
(Wales) Cliff Wilson	w/d
(England) Neal Foulds	5
(England) Jim Chambers	0
(England) Willie Thorne	5
(Wales) Wayne Jones	1
(England) Mike Hallett	5
(England) Barry West	4
(England) John Virgo	5
(Canada) Marcel Gauvreau	2
(England) Les Dodd	5
(England) Brian Morgan	2
(Scotland) Stephen Hendry	5
(Canada) Alain Robidoux	4

Last 16; Best of 9 frames
(Wales) Steve Newbury	1
(England) Gary Wilkinson	5
(England) Martin Clark	3
(Northern Ireland) Dennis Taylor	5
(England) Tony Jones	3
(England) Ian Graham	5
(Northern Ireland) Alex Higgins	2
(New Zealand) Dene O'Kane	5
(England) Jimmy White	5
(Wales) Doug Mountjoy	3
(England) Neal Foulds	5
(England) Willie Thorne	1
(England) Mike Hallett	5
(England) John Virgo	1
(England) Les Dodd	3
(Scotland) Stephen Hendry	5

Quarter-finals; Best of 9 frames
(England) Gary Wilkinson	5
(Northern Ireland) Dennis Taylor	3
(England) Ian Graham	1
(New Zealand) Dene O'Kane	5
(England) Jimmy White	5
(England) Neal Foulds	2
(England) Mike Hallett	5
(Scotland) Stephen Hendry	4

Semi-finals; Best of 9 frames
(England) Gary Wilkinson	4
(New Zealand) Dene O'Kane	5
(England) Jimmy White	2
(England) Mike Hallett	5

Final; Best of 17 frames
(New Zealand) Dene O'Kane	8
(England) Mike Hallett	9
