= 1989 European Open (snooker) =

1989 ICI European Open
Tournament information
- Dates: 30 January – 11 February 1989
- Venue: Casino de Deauville
- City: Deauville
- Country: France
- Organisation: WPBSA
- Format: Ranking event
- Winner's share: £40,000

Final
- Champion: John Parrott (ENG)
- Runner-up: Terry Griffiths (WAL)
- Score: 9–8

The 1989 European Open (officially the 1989 ICI European Open) was a professional ranking snooker tournament that took place from January to February 1989 at the Casino de Deauville in Deauville, France.

John Parrott won the tournament, defeating Terry Griffiths 9–8 in the final.

== Prize fund ==
- Winner: £40,000
- Runner-up: £24,000
- Semi-final: £12,000
- Quarter-final: £6,000
- Last 16: £3,000
- Last 32: £1,927
- Last 64: £875
- Highest break: £2,000
- Total: £200,000

== Main draw ==
=== Top half ===
Round 1 (Last 64); Best of 9 frames
1	(England) Steve Davis	w/d
73	(England) Jim Chambers	w/o
19	(Australia) Eddie Charlton	5
50	(England) Steve Duggan	1
29	(Canada) Bob Chaperon	3
(England) Craig Edwards	5
15	(England) John Virgo	5
40	(Wales) Ray Reardon	3
14	(South Africa) Peter Francisco	0
56	(Australia) John Campbell	5
20	(Malta) Tony Drago	1
52	(Wales) Mark Bennett	5
28	(England) David Taylor	2
45	(England) Gary Wilkinson	5
7	(England) John Parrott	w/o
93	(England) Eric Lawlor	w/d
8	(England) Tony Knowles	2
43	(England) Danny Fowler	5
27	(England) John Spencer	w/d
(Isle of Man) Tony Wilson	w/o
32	(England) Steve James	1
(England) Mark Johnston-Allen	5
12	(South Africa) Silvino Francisco	1
38	(Canada) Jim Wych	5
9	(England) Mike Hallett	5
57	(England) Dave Gilbert	3
22	(England) Dean Reynolds	w/d
54	(Republic of Ireland) Paddy Browne	w/o
30	(England) Steve Longworth	w/o
34	(Wales) Wayne Jones	w/d
4	(Scotland) Stephen Hendry	5
35	(Republic of Ireland) Joe O'Boye	2

Round 2 (Last 32); Best of 9 frames
73	(England) Jim Chambers	2
19	(Australia) Eddie Charlton	5
(England) Craig Edwards	3
15	(England) John Virgo	5
56	(Australia) John Campbell	5
52	(Wales) Mark Bennett	3
45	(England) Gary Wilkinson	2
7	(England) John Parrott	5
43	(England) Danny Fowler	5
(Isle of Man) Tony Wilson	2
(England) Mark Johnston-Allen	4
38	(Canada) Jim Wych	5
9	(England) Mike Hallett	5
54	(Republic of Ireland) Paddy Browne	4
30	(England) Steve Longworth	0
4	(Scotland) Stephen Hendry	5

Round 3 (Last 16); Best of 9 frames
19	(Australia) Eddie Charlton	5
15	(England) John Virgo	4
56	(Australia) John Campbell	0
7	(England) John Parrott	5
43	(England) Danny Fowler	4
38	(Canada) Jim Wych	5
9	(England) Mike Hallett	5
4	(Scotland) Stephen Hendry	3

Quarter-finals; Best of 9 frames
19	(Australia) Eddie Charlton	1
7	(England) John Parrott	5
38	(Canada) Jim Wych	3
9	(England) Mike Hallett	5

Semi-final; Best of 9 frames
7	(England) John Parrott	5
9	(England) Mike Hallett	4

=== Bottom half ===
Round 1 (Last 64); Best of 9 frames
3	(England) Neal Foulds	3
41	(England) Martin Clark	5
21	(Republic of Ireland) Eugene Hughes	5
82	(Canada) Mario Morra	1
18	(England) Tony Meo	1
39	(England) David Roe	5
11	(England) Joe Johnson	5
46	(England) Graham Cripsey	2
16	(Wales) Cliff Wilson	5
49	(England) Tony Jones	3
25	(Wales) Steve Newbury	0
102	(Canada) Alain Robidoux	5
23	(New Zealand) Dene O'Kane	0
51	(Wales) Tony Chappel	5
5	(Wales) Terry Griffiths	5
64	(Northern Ireland) Jack McLaughlin	3
6	(Canada) Cliff Thorburn	5
55	(England) Ray Edmonds	2
26	(England) Barry West	4
48	(Scotland) Murdo MacLeod	5
24	(Wales) Doug Mountjoy	5
42	(Northern Ireland) Tommy Murphy	1
10	(Northern Ireland) Dennis Taylor	5
37	(Canada) Kirk Stevens	0
13	(England) Willie Thorne	5
84	(England) Bill Oliver	1
17	(Northern Ireland) Alex Higgins	5
62	(England) Les Dodd	2
18	(England) Rex Williams	5
44	(Australia) Warren King	2
2	(England) Jimmy White	5
85	(Scotland) Eddie Sinclair	3

Round 2 (Last 32); Best of 9 frames
41	(England) Martin Clark	5
21	(Republic of Ireland) Eugene Hughes	1
39	(England) David Roe	2
11	(England) Joe Johnson	5
16	(Wales) Cliff Wilson	0
102	(Canada) Alain Robidoux	5
51	(Wales) Tony Chappel	2
5	(Wales) Terry Griffiths	5
6	(Canada) Cliff Thorburn	5
48	(Scotland) Murdo MacLeod	1
24	(Wales) Doug Mountjoy	5
10	(Northern Ireland) Dennis Taylor	3
13	(England) Willie Thorne	5
17	(Northern Ireland) Alex Higgins	1
18	(England) Rex Williams	2
2	(England) Jimmy White	5

Round 3 (Last 16); Best of 9 frames
41	(England) Martin Clark	5
11	(England) Joe Johnson	4
102	(Canada) Alain Robidoux	3
5	(Wales) Terry Griffiths	5
6	(Canada) Cliff Thorburn	5
24	(Wales) Doug Mountjoy	0
13	(England) Willie Thorne	3
2	(England) Jimmy White	5

Quarter-finals; Best of 9 frames
41	(England) Martin Clark	1
5	(Wales) Terry Griffiths	5
6	(Canada) Cliff Thorburn	3
2	(England) Jimmy White	5

Semi-final; Best of 9 frames
5	(Wales) Terry Griffiths	5
2	(England) Jimmy White	4

=== Final ===
Final: Best of 17 frames. Referee: Alan Chamberlain. Casino de Deauville, Deauville, France, 11 February 1989.
John Parrott (7); England	9–8	Terry Griffiths (5); Wales
Afternoon: 1–68, 41–77, 0–87 (87), 126–20 (58), 32–61, 62–52, 73–48 (58), 123–8 (62); Evening: 51–61, 89–6 (85), 61–13, 69–7 (54), 18–59, 23–91 (91), 55–56 (Parrott 54), 122–12 (106), 62–19
106	Highest break	91
1	Century breaks	0
7	50+ breaks	2

== Century breaks ==
=== Main stage centuries ===
- 136, 119 – Jimmy White
- 128 – Doug Mountjoy
- 125 – Willie Thorne
- 116, 106, 106 – John Parrott
- 116, 105 – Cliff Thorburn
- 112, 110, 106, 100 – Terry Griffiths
- 104 – Tony Meo
- 104 – Tony Chappel
- 101 – John Campbell

=== Qualifying stage centuries ===
- 147, 107 – Alain Robidoux
- 110 – Mario Morra
- 102 – Mark Johnston-Allen
