= 1988 UK Championship =

1988 Tennent's UK Championship
Tournament information
- Dates: 19–27 November 1988
- Venue: Preston Guild Hall
- City: Preston
- Country: England
- Organisation: WPBSA
- Format: Ranking event
- Winner's share: £80,000
- Highest break: David Roe (ENG) (139)

Final
- Champion: Doug Mountjoy (WAL)
- Runner-up: Stephen Hendry (SCO)
- Score: 16–12

The 1988 UK Championship (officially the 1988 Tennent's UK Championship) was a professional ranking snooker tournament that took place between 19 and 27 November 1988 at the Guild Hall in Preston, England. This was the last UK Championship to be sponsored by Tennent's; for the following two years the championship would be sponsored by StormSeal. The highest break of the tournament was 139 by David Roe.

Doug Mountjoy defeated Stephen Hendry 16–12 in the final and received the £80,000 winner's prize. Aged 46 years and 172 days, Mountjoy became the tournament's oldest winner, a record that stood for the next 35 years. Ronnie O'Sullivan superseded Mountjoy as the oldest UK Champion when he won the 2023 event aged 47 years and 363 days.

The final attracted an average of 13.2 million viewers on BBC1, peaking at 16.3 million.

== Main draw ==
Last 64; Best of 17 frames
(England) Steve Davis	9
(Australia) Warren King	7
(England) Gary Wilkinson	9
(Canada) Bob Chaperon	0
(England) Martin Clark	9
(England) Mike Hallett	6
(England) Danny Fowler	9
(England) Steve Longworth	8
(Northern Ireland) Dennis Taylor	9
(Northern Ireland) Jack McLaughlin	5
(Republic of Ireland) Joe O'Boye	9
(Republic of Ireland) Eugene Hughes	8
(England) John Parrott	9
(England) Dave Martin	6
(England) Nigel Gilbert	9
(England) John Spencer	7
(Canada) Cliff Thorburn	9
(Canada) Alain Robidoux	4
(England) Steve James	9
(Republic of Ireland) Tony Kearney	1
(South Africa) Peter Francisco	9
(Scotland) John Rea	2
(England) David Roe	9
(England) Tony Meo	6
(England) Willie Thorne	9
(England) Dave Gilbert	3
(Canada) Kirk Stevens	9
(Australia) Eddie Charlton	7
(Scotland) Stephen Hendry	9
(Northern Ireland) Tommy Murphy	4
(Wales) Colin Roscoe	9
(Wales) Steve Newbury	7
(England) Neal Foulds	9
(England) Mark Rowing	4
(Wales) Doug Mountjoy	9
(Wales) Wayne Jones	7
(England) Joe Johnson	9
(England) Martin Smith	2
(England) Rex Williams	9
(England) Bob Harris	4
(England) John Virgo	9
(England) Brian Rowswell	3
(New Zealand) Dene O'Kane	9
(Wales) Ray Reardon	8
(England) Tony Knowles	9
(Canada) Jim Wych	4
(Northern Ireland) Alex Higgins	9
(England) Les Dodd	7
(Wales) Terry Griffiths	9
(England) Ken Owers	2
(England) Steve Duggan	9
(Malta) Tony Drago	7
(Wales) Cliff Wilson	9
(England) Ray Edmonds	1
(England) Dean Reynolds	9
(Wales) Tony Chappel	4
(South Africa) Silvino Francisco	9
(England) Paul Medati	8
(England) Barry West	9
(England) Tony Jones	5
(England) Jimmy White	9
(Australia) John Campbell	5
(Wales) Mark Bennett	9
(England) David Taylor	4

Last 32; Best of 17 frames
(England) Steve Davis	9
(England) Gary Wilkinson	3
(England) Martin Clark	6
(England) Danny Fowler	9
(Northern Ireland) Dennis Taylor	9
(Republic of Ireland) Joe O'Boye	4
(England) John Parrott	9
(England) Nigel Gilbert	8
(Canada) Cliff Thorburn	9
(England) Steve James	6
(South Africa) Peter Francisco	7
(England) David Roe	9
(England) Willie Thorne	9
(Canada) Kirk Stevens	3
(Scotland) Stephen Hendry	9
(Wales) Colin Roscoe	3
(England) Neal Foulds	4
(Wales) Doug Mountjoy	9
(England) Joe Johnson	9
(England) Rex Williams	7
(England) John Virgo	9
(New Zealand) Dene O'Kane	8
(England) Tony Knowles	9
(Northern Ireland) Alex Higgins	6
(Wales) Terry Griffiths	9
(England) Steve Duggan	2
(Wales) Cliff Wilson	3
(England) Dean Reynolds	9
(South Africa) Silvino Francisco	4
(England) Barry West	9
(England) Jimmy White	6
(Wales) Mark Bennett	9

Last 16; Best of 17 frames
(England) Steve Davis	9
(England) Danny Fowler	6
(Northern Ireland) Dennis Taylor	4
(England) John Parrott	9
(Canada) Cliff Thorburn	9
(England) David Roe	8
(England) Willie Thorne	4
(Scotland) Stephen Hendry	9
(Wales) Doug Mountjoy	9
(England) Joe Johnson	5
(England) John Virgo	9
(England) Tony Knowles	3
(Wales) Terry Griffiths	9
(England) Dean Reynolds	6
(England) Barry West	9
(Wales) Mark Bennett	4

Quarter-finals; Best of 17 frames
(England) Steve Davis	9
(England) John Parrott	4
(Canada) Cliff Thorburn	2
(Scotland) Stephen Hendry	9
(Wales) Doug Mountjoy	9
(England) John Virgo	8
(Wales) Terry Griffiths	9
(England) Barry West	5

Semi-finals; Best of 17 frames
(England) Steve Davis	3
(Scotland) Stephen Hendry	9
(Wales) Doug Mountjoy	9
(Wales) Terry Griffiths	4

Final; Best of 31 frames
(Scotland) Stephen Hendry	12
(Wales) Doug Mountjoy	16

== Final ==
Final: Best of 31 frames. Referee: John Street; The Guild Hall, Preston, England, 26 and 27 November 1988.
Doug Mountjoy; Wales	16–12	Stephen Hendry; Scotland
First session: 75–25, 0–103 (103), 79–6 (71), 75–30, 25–113 (113), 81–47 (52), 87–0; Second session: 124–7 (98), 62–65, 13–96 (68), 14–89, 37–72 (55), 79–9, 0-136 (129); Third session: 76–49, 71–41, 125–0 (81), 73–0 (72), 71–21, 131–1 (131), 106–0 (106); Fourth session: 129–0 (124), 15–96 (96), 54–66, 5–73, 21–80 (61), 43–56, 67–11
131	Highest break	129
3	Century breaks	3
10	50+ breaks	6

== Century breaks ==
- 139, 108 – David Roe
- 136, 101 – Steve Davis
- 136 – Joe Johnson
- 134, 124, 108 – John Parrott
- 133 – Bill Werbeniuk
- 132, 113, 103 – Stephen Hendry
- 132 – Dene O'Kane
- 131, 129, 124, 121, 118, 106 – Doug Mountjoy
- 128, 108 – Terry Griffiths
- 128, 106 – Cliff Thorburn
- 128 – Robert Marshall
- 120, 118, 115 – Dean Reynolds
- 118 – Dave Martin
- 113 – Steve Campbell
- 111 – John Spencer
- 109 – Marcel Gauvreau
- 108 – Tony Jones
- 106, 104 – Gary Wilkinson
- 106, 104 – John Virgo
- 105 – Ken Owers
- 105 – Willie Thorne
- 103, 101 – Jimmy White
- 102 – Steve Longworth
- 101 – Warren King
- 101 – Martin Smith
- 100 – Steve Newbury
