= Canadian Amateur Championship (snooker) =

Tournament information
- Location: Toronto
- Country: Canada
- Established: 1969; 57 years ago
- Organisation(s): Canadian Billiards & Snooker Association
- Format: Amateur event
- Recent edition: 2025
- Current champion: (Canada) Sahil Nayyar

The Canadian Amateur Championship (occasionally known as the Canadian Snooker Championship) is an annual snooker competition played in Canada and is the highest ranking amateur event in the country.

The competition was first established back in 1969 which was won by Paul Thornley. Alain Robidoux is the record championship holder with seven titles, one ahead of Kirk Stevens. Tom Finstad holds the record for reaching the most finals having reached eleven finals and won the championship three times.

Many former champions have gone on to play on the world tour such as Alain Robidoux, Kirk Stevens, Bob Chaperon, Jim Wych, Bill Werbeniuk and most notably Cliff Thorburn who won the competition in 1972, 1974, 1975, 1976, 1977 and 2001, eventually going on to become the first player in the modern era from outside the United Kingdom to win the World Snooker Championship in 1980.

== Winners ==
Year	Winner	Runner-up	Final score	City
1969	(Canada) Paul Thornley	(Canada) Don Maybee	18–10	Toronto
1970	(Canada) Paul Thornley	Unknown	Unknown	Unknown
1971	(Canada) Winnie McKinlay	Unknown	Unknown	Unknown
1972	(Canada) Cliff Thorburn	Unknown	Unknown	Unknown
1973	(Canada) Bill Werbeniuk	(Canada) Robert Paquette	16–15	Toronto
1974	(Canada) Cliff Thorburn	(Canada) Julien St. Denis	13–11	Ottawa
1975	(Canada) Cliff Thorburn	(Canada) Bill Werbeniuk	11–1	Ottawa
1976	(Canada) Cliff Thorburn	(Canada) Bill Werbeniuk	9–2	Ottawa
1977	(Canada) Cliff Thorburn	(Canada) Robert Paquette	10–6	Ottawa
1978	(Canada) Kirk Stevens	(Canada) Robert Paquette	10–6	Ottawa
1979	(Canada) Jim Wych	(Canada) Robert Paquette	10–7	Ottawa
1980	(Canada) Jim Bear	(Canada) Robert Paquette	9–3	Ottawa
1981	(Canada) Bob Chaperon	(Canada) Carey Lorraine	9–5	Ottawa
1982	(Canada) Brian McConnell	(Canada) Robert Paquette	9–7	Montreal
1983	(Canada) Alain Robidoux	(Canada) Tom Finstad	9–3	Montreal
1984	(Canada) Tom Finstad	(Canada) Claude Smith	9–6	Montreal
1985	(Canada) Alain Robidoux	(Canada) Mike Sobala	9–6	Montreal
1986	(Canada) Gary Natale	(Canada) Larry Firth	7–4	Vancouver
1987	(Canada) Alain Robidoux	(Canada) Jeff White	7–1	Vancouver
1988	(Canada) Brady Gollan	(Canada) John Bear	7–3	Halifax
1989	(Canada) Tom Finstad	(Canada) Gary Natale	8–6	Halifax
1990	(Canada) John White	(Canada) Jeff White	Unknown	Halifax
1991	(Canada) Ed Galati	(Canada) Frank Kissner	8–5	Toronto
1992	(Canada) Chris Woods	(Canada) Fern Loyer	8–1	Saskatoon
1993	(Canada) Daryl Wouters	(Canada) Tom Matsui	8–6	Saskatoon
1994	(Canada) Kirk Clouthier	(Canada) John Kenyon	6–3	Guelph
1995	(Canada) Mike Sobala	(Canada) Gerard Morrison	7–3	Vancouver
1996	(Canada) Ben Reicker	(Canada) Ray Saunders	8–4	Saskatoon
1997	(Canada) Kirk Stevens	(Canada) Charlie Brown	6–3	Saint John
1998	(Canada) Kirk Stevens	(Canada) Tom Finstad	7–3	Halifax
1999	(Canada) Jim Wych	(Canada) Tom Finstad	6–4	Saint John
2000	(Canada) Kirk Stevens	(Canada) Bob Chaperon	6–3	Guelph
2001	(Canada) Cliff Thorburn	(Canada) Tom Finstad	4–3	Vaughan
2002	(Canada) Kirk Stevens	(Canada) Cliff Thorburn	6–1	Saint John
2003	(Canada) Alain Robidoux	(Canada) Cliff Thorburn	6–2	Halifax
2004	(Canada) Alain Robidoux	(Canada) Tom Finstad	6–2	Montreal
2005	(Canada) Tom Finstad	(Canada) John White	6–4	Montreal
2006	(Canada) Alain Robidoux	(Canada) John White	6–2	Markham
2007	(Canada) Floyd Ziegler	(Canada) Tom Finstad	6–0	Ottawa
2008	(Canada) Kirk Stevens	(Canada) Tom Finstad	6–2	Toronto
2009	(Canada) Alain Robidoux	(Canada) John White	6–1	Toronto
2010	(Canada) Floyd Ziegler	(Canada) Fern Loyer	6–3	Toronto
2011	(Canada) Alex Pagulayan	(Canada) Floyd Ziegler	6–0	Toronto
2012	(Canada) Alex Pagulayan	(Canada) Tom Finstad	6–3	Toronto
2013	(Canada) Floyd Ziegler	(Canada) Jason Williams	6–2	Toronto
2014	(Canada) Alan Whitfield	(Canada) Floyd Ziegler	6–1	Toronto
2015	(Canada) John White	(Canada) Floyd Ziegler	6–2	Toronto
2016	(Canada) Rodney Cuillèrier	(Canada) Floyd Ziegler	7–4	Saint-Lambert
2017	(Canada) John White	(Canada) Fern Loyer	7–5	Toronto
2018	(Canada) Brady Gollan	(Canada) Alan Whitfield	6–4	Toronto
2019	(Canada) Bob Chaperon	(Canada) Lobsang Lama	6–5	Toronto
2020	Tournament Not Held			
2021	Tournament Not Held			
2022	(Canada) Vito Puopolo	(Canada) Alan Whitfield	5–3	Toronto
2023	(Canada) Jason Williams	(Canada) Floyd Ziegler	5–1	Toronto
2024	(Canada) Wei Gao	(Canada) Derrick Claus	5–2	
2025	(Canada) Sahil Nayyar	(Canada) Alan Whitfield	5–2	

== Finalists ==
Rank	Name	Winner	Runner-up	Finals
1	Alain Robidoux	7	0	7
2	Cliff Thorburn	6	2	8
3	Kirk Stevens	6	0	6
4	Tom Finstad	3	8	11
5	Floyd Ziegler	3	4	7
6	John White	3	3	6
7	Bob Chaperon	2	1	3
8	Brady Gollan	2	0	2
8	Paul Thornley	2	0	2
8	Jim Wych	2	0	2
8	Alex Pagulayan	2	0	2
12	Bill Werbeniuk	1	2	3
12	Alan Whitfield	1	2	3
14	Gary Natale	1	1	2
14	Mike Sobala	1	1	2
16	Winnie McKinley	1	0	1
16	Jim Bear	1	0	1
16	Brian McConnell	1	0	1
16	Ed Galati	1	0	1
16	Chris Wood	1	0	1
16	Daryl Wouters	1	0	1
16	Kirk Clouthier	1	0	1
16	Ben Reicker	1	0	1
16	Rodney Cuillèrier	1	0	1
16	Vito Puopolo	1	0	1
26	Robert Paquette	0	6	6
27	Fern Loyer	0	3	3
28	Jeff White	0	2	2
29	Lobsang Lama	0	1	1
29	Julien St. Denis	0	1	1
29	Carey Lorraine	0	1	1
29	Claude Smith	0	1	1
29	Larry Firth	0	1	1
29	John Bear	0	1	1
29	Tom Matsui	0	1	1
29	John Kenyon	0	1	1
29	Gerard Morrison	0	1	1
29	Ray Saunders	0	1	1
29	Charlie Brown	0	1	1
29	Frank Kissner	0	1	1
29	Jason Williams	1	1	2
