= Mark Johnston-Allen =

English snooker player (born 1968)

Personal information
- Born: 28 December 1968 (age 57)

Sport
- Country: England
- Sport: Snooker
- Professional: 1988–1997, 1998–2001
- Highest ranking: 31 (1992–1994)
- Best ranking finish: Runner-up (x2)

Mark Johnston-Allen (born 28 December 1968) is an English former professional snooker player.

== Early life ==
From Bristol, the son of David and older brother of Craig who was also a junior snooker player.

== Career ==
He won three consecutive Avon County Championships and won the English junior and senior champion prior to turning professional ahead of the 1988-1989 snooker season. He reached the last-16 at the 1989 British Open, recording credible wins over Terry Griffiths and Eugene Hughes, before his run was ended by former world champion Joe Johnson. After his first season as a professional he had risen to number 52 in the world rankings. Over the next couple of seasons his ranking moved down to number 59 and then back to number 52 in the world.

Johnston-Allen reached the final of the 1991 European Open while ranked #59 in the world, a run which included a 5–0 win over Stephen Hendry, but lost 7–9 to Tony Jones in the final. He reached the final of the same event again a year later, this time losing 9–3 to Jimmy White. He qualified for the main stage of the World Championship in 1992, but lost 4–10 to Tony Knowles in the first round.

At the International Open in 1995, he knocked out Hendry, Mark Williams and Ronnie O'Sullivan before losing 5–0 to White in the quarter-finals. He defeated White en route to the semi-finals of the 1995 Thailand Open, where he lost to James Wattana. His world ranking peaked at number 31, in the 1992/1993 season, During his career, he won each of his three matches against Stephen Hendry.

== Performance and rankings timeline ==
Tournament	1988/ 89	1989/ 90	1990/ 91	1991/ 92	1992/ 93	1993/ 94	1994/ 95	1995/ 96	1996/ 97	1997/ 98	1998/ 99	1999/ 00
Ranking (Note: It shows the ranking at the beginning of the season)	(Note: New players on the Main Tour do not have a ranking)	52	59	52	31	31	44	49	44	(Note: He was an amateur)		139
Ranking tournaments
British Open	3R	1R	LQ	3R	1R	1R	1R	3R	LQ	A	LQ	A
Grand Prix	1R	1R	1R	LQ	1R	1R	LQ	LQ	LQ	A	1R	A
UK Championship	LQ	1R	LQ	1R	1R	1R	LQ	1R	LQ	A	LQ	A
China Open (Note: The event was called the China International (1997/1998–1998/1999))	Tournament Not Held									NR	LQ	A
Welsh Open	Tournament Not Held			LQ	1R	1R	1R	1R	1R	A	LQ	A
Thailand Masters (Note: The event was called the Asian Open (1989/1990–1992/1993) and the Thailand Open (1993/1994–1996/1997))	NH	1R	LQ	1R	2R	LQ	SF	LQ	LQ	A	LQ	A
Scottish Open (Note: The event was called the International Open (1988/1989–1989/1990 and 1992/1993–1996/1997))	1R	2R	Not Held		1R	1R	QF	LQ	1R	A	LQ	A
World Championship	LQ	LQ	LQ	1R	LQ	LQ	LQ	LQ	LQ	LQ	LQ	LQ
Non-ranking tournaments
The Masters	A	A	LQ	LQ	LQ	LQ	LQ	A	LQ	A	LQ	A
Former ranking tournaments
Canadian Masters	LQ	Tournament Not Held										
Hong Kong Open (Note: The event was called the Australian Open (1994/1995–1995/1996 and the Australian Masters (1995/1996))	NH	LQ	Tournament Not Held				Non-Ranking		Tournament Not Held			
Classic	LQ	1R	LQ	1R	Tournament Not Held							
Strachan Open (Note: The event was called the Strachan Challenge (1992/1993–1993/1994))	Tournament Not Held			LQ	MR	NR	Tournament Not Held					
Asian Classic (Note: The event was called the Dubai Classic (1989/1990-1994/1995) and the Thailand Classic (1995/1996))	NR	LQ	1R	WD	1R	LQ	LQ	2R	LQ	Tournament Not Held		
German Open (Note: The event was called the German Open (1995/1996–1997/1998))	Tournament Not Held							LQ	LQ	A	NR	NH
Irish Open (Note: The event was called the European Open (1988/1989–1996/1997))	2R	1R	F	F	QF	LQ	LQ	LQ	LQ	NH	LQ	NH
Former non-ranking tournaments
English Professional Championship	LQ	Tournament Not Held										
Shoot Out	Not Held		2R	Tournament Not Held								
World Masters	Not Held		1R	Tournament Not Held								

Performance Table Legend
LQ	lost in the qualifying draw	#R	lost in the early rounds of the tournament (WR = Wildcard round, RR = Round robin)	QF	lost in the quarter-finals
SF	lost in the semi–finals	F	lost in the final	W	won the tournament
DNQ	did not qualify for the tournament	A	did not participate in the tournament	WD	withdrew from the tournament

NH / Not Held	event was not held.
NR / Non-Ranking Event	event is/was no longer a ranking event.
R / Ranking Event	event is/was a ranking event.
MR / Minor-Ranking Event	means an event is/was a minor-ranking event.
PA / Pro–am Event	means an event is/was a pro–am event.

== Career finals ==
=== Ranking finals: 2 ===
Outcome	Year	Championship	Opponent in the final	Score
Runner-up	1991	European Open	(England) Tony Jones	7–9
Runner-up	1992	European Open (2)	(England) Jimmy White	3–9

=== Pro-am finals: 2 ===
Outcome	Year	Championship	Opponent in the final	Score
Runner-up	1985	Pontins Autumn Open	(England) Gary Bray	5–7
Runner-up	1987	Pontins Autumn Open (2)	(England) Nick Terry	4–5

=== Amateur finals: 1 (1 title) ===
Outcome	Year	Championship	Opponent in the final	Score
Winner	1987	British Under-19 Championship	(Scotland) Drew Henry	3–2
