= 1996 German Open (snooker) =

Tournament information
- Dates: 9–15 December 1996
- Venue: Roberts Barracks
- City: Osnabrück
- Country: Germany
- Organisation: WPBSA
- Format: Ranking event
- Winner's share: £40,000
- Highest break: Alain Robidoux (CAN) (145)

Final
- Champion: Ronnie O'Sullivan (ENG)
- Runner-up: Alain Robidoux (CAN)
- Score: 9–7

The 1996 German Open was a professional ranking snooker tournament that took place between 9 and 15 December 1996 at the Roberts Barracks in Osnabrück, Germany. It was the second edition of the event, with 16 players competing in the final stage. Ronnie O'Sullivan won the event, beating Alain Robidoux 9–7 in the final. It was Robidoux's only appearance in a ranking event final.

== Summary ==
16 players competed in the final stage at the British military base at Osnabrück. Play was delayed for two hours on the opening day, after the heating system failed.

Ronnie O'Sullivan beat Stephen Hendry 5–2 in the quarter-finals and then beat Nigel Bond 6–1 in the semi-finals, including three century breaks. O'Sullivan met Alain Robidoux in the final, winning 9–7. O'Sullivan was 4–2 ahead before Robidoux made a break of 145 in frame 7, the highest-ever in a ranking event outside the United Kingdom. O'Sullivan led 5–3 after the first session and later extended his lead to 7–3 before Robidoux won the next four frames to level the match at 7–7. O'Sullivan then won the next two frames to win the match, finishing with a break of 108. O'Sullivan won £40,000 while Robidoux took the runners-up prize of £22,500 and the high break prize of £5,000.

== Main draw ==
Last 16; Best of 9 frames
1	John Higgins (SCO)	5
15	Tony Drago (MLT)	4
7	Ken Doherty (IRL)	2
16	Mark Williams (WAL)	5
14	Alain Robidoux (CAN)	5
Jason Ferguson (ENG)	1
11	Dave Harold (ENG)	5
David Gray (ENG)	2
Martin Clark (ENG)	1
Mark Davis (ENG)	5
10	Steve Davis (ENG)	3
5	Nigel Bond (ENG)	5
8	Ronnie O'Sullivan (ENG)	5
Andy Hicks (ENG)	1
2	Stephen Hendry (SCO)	5
9	Darren Morgan (WAL)	1

Quarter-finals; Best of 9 frames
1	(Scotland) John Higgins	5
16	(Wales) Mark Williams	1
14	(Canada) Alain Robidoux	5
11	(England) Dave Harold	4
5	(England) Nigel Bond	5
(England) Mark Davis	4
8	(England) Ronnie O'Sullivan	5
2	(Scotland) Stephen Hendry	2

Semi-finals; Best of 11 frames
1	(Scotland) John Higgins	4
14	(Canada) Alain Robidoux	6
5	(England) Nigel Bond	1
8	(England) Ronnie O'Sullivan	6

Final; Best of 17 frames
14	(Canada) Alain Robidoux	7
8	(England) Ronnie O'Sullivan	9

== Qualifying ==
The final qualifying round was held in Preston, Lancashire in November 1996.

=== Final qualifying round ===
John Higgins (SCO)	5–1	Stephen Lee (ENG)
Tony Drago (MLT)	5–3	Jamie Burnett (SCO)
Ken Doherty (IRL)	5–1	Dean Reynolds (ENG)
Mark Williams (WAL)	5–2	Mick Price (ENG)
Alain Robidoux (CAN)	5–1	Anthony Hamilton (ENG)
Alan McManus (SCO)	3–5	Jason Ferguson (ENG)
Dave Harold (ENG)	5–3	Brian Morgan (ENG)
John Parrott (ENG)	3–5	David Gray (ENG)

Peter Ebdon (ENG)	4–5	Martin Clark (ENG)
Jimmy White (ENG)	1–5	Mark Davis (ENG)
Steve Davis (ENG)	5–2	Ian Sargeant (WAL)
Nigel Bond (ENG)	5–2	Dave Finbow (ENG)
Ronnie O'Sullivan (ENG)	5–0	Karl Broughton (ENG)
James Wattana (THA)	1–5	Andy Hicks (ENG)
Stephen Hendry (SCO)	5–4	Gary Wilkinson (ENG)
Darren Morgan (WAL)	5–0	Paul Davies (WAL)
