= Brady Gollan =

Canadian snooker player

Personal information
- Born: 28 March 1965 (age 61)

Sport
- Country: Canada
- Sport: Snooker
- Professional: 1989–1994
- Highest ranking: 35 (1991/1992)
- Best ranking finish: Semi-final (×1)

Brady Gollan (born 28 March 1965) is a Canadian former professional snooker player. He became a professional player, and was, with Jim Wych, a finalist in the doubles event at the 1991 World Masters.

== Career ==
Brady Gollan was born on 28 March 1965. He started playing cue sports when he was about 14. He later stopped playing hockey, and, a year later, ended his formal education, to focus on playing. Gollan reached the quarter-finals of the 1986 World Amateur Championship. He won the 1988 Canadian Amateur Championship and reached the quarter-finals of the 1988 World Amateur Championship, during which he made a championship-record break of 135.

He turned professional in 1989 through the Professional Play-offs, the tour qualifying event at the time, where he defeated Patsy Fagan 9–2 in the play-off match. In Gollan's first season as a professional he recorded three last-32 finishes - at the 1989 Hong Kong Open, the 1989 Asian Open and the 1990 World Snooker Championship - and reached the last 16 at one tournament, the 1989 UK Championship. In Hong Kong, Dennis Taylor defeated Gollan 5–4, while Willie Thorne defeated him 5–1 at the Asian Open. His run at the UK Championship, encompassing victories over Dave Martin and Eddie Charlton, concluded with a 5–9 loss to Alain Robidoux.

At the 1990 World Snooker Championship, he overcame Clive Everton 10–2, Paul Gibson 10–5, Kirk Stevens 10–6, Brian Morgan 10–6 and Eugene Hughes 10–7 to qualify for the main stages at the Crucible Theatre for the first time. There, he was drawn against Doug Mountjoy and lost 8–10.

The following season, Gollan reached the last 32 at the 1990 Asian Open - losing 4–5 to Mountjoy - and at the 1991 British Open, where Taylor whitewashed him 5–0. Partnering Jim Wych, he reached the final of the doubles event at the 1991 World Masters. They took a 5–3 lead against Stephen Hendry and Mike Hallett, but lost the match 5–8. He was eliminated in a 0–7 loss to Jimmy White in the singles event at the 991 World Masters, but recorded the best performance of his career at the 1991 European Open, where he defeated Mike Darrington, Bob Chaperon, James Wattana, Peter Francisco and Mountjoy to reach the semi-finals, where he lost 2–6 to Tony Jones. He failed to qualify for the 1991 World Championship due to a 6–10 defeat to Barry Pinches.

In the 1991/1992 season, Gollan lost in the last 32 at the Dubai Classic, 2–5 to Joe Johnson and the last 16 at the 1992 Strachan Open, by the same scoreline to Ken Doherty, and his World Championship run ended with a 1–10 loss to Andy Hicks in his first match.

Gollan withdrew from the 1994 World Snooker Championship and did not play again professionally. He won the Canadian Amateur Championship again in 2018.

== Career finals ==
=== Team finals: 1 ===
Outcome	No.	Year	Championship	Team/partner	Opponent(s) in the final	Score
Runner-up	1.	1991	World Masters	(Canada) Jim Wych	(England) Mike Hallett (Scotland) Stephen Hendry	5–8

=== Amateur finals: 2 (2 titles) ===
Outcome	No.	Year	Championship	Opponent in the final	Score
Winner	1.	1988	Canadian Amateur Championship	(Canada) John Bear	7–3
Winner	2.	2018	Canadian Amateur Championship (2)	(Canada) Alan Whitfield	6–4
