= 1988 Canadian Professional Championship =

Canadian Professional Championship
Tournament information
- Dates: 7–13 August 1988
- Venue: Westbury Snooker Club; Minkler Auditorium
- City: Kitchener; Toronto
- Country: Canada
- Format: Non-ranking event
- Total prize fund: $50,000
- Winner's share: $13,500
- Highest break: Mario Morra (125)

Final
- Champion: Alain Robidoux
- Runner-up: Jim Wych
- Score: 8–4

The 1988 BCE Canadian Professional Championship was a professional non-ranking snooker tournament, which took place between 7 and 13 August 1988. The rounds until the final were played at the Westbury Snooker Club in Kitchener while the final was played at the Minkler Auditorium in Toronto, both in Canada. This was the last edition of the tournament.

Alain Robidoux won the title by beating Jim Wych 8–4 in the final.

== Main draw ==
First round Best of 11 frames
Alain Robidoux	6
Bob Chaperon	3
Joe Cagianello	6
Jim Bear	3
Bernie Mikkelsen	6
Marcel Gauvreau	2
Jim Wych	6
Paul Thornley	5
Mario Morra	6
Gerry Watson	2
Frank Jonik	w/o
Gino Rigitano	w/d

Quarter-finals; Best of 11 frames
Alain Robidoux	6
Joe Cagianello	4
Bernie Mikkelsen	6
Kirk Stevens	5
Jim Wych	6
Mario Morra	4
Cliff Thorburn	6
Frank Jonik	4

Semi-finals; Best of 13 frames
Alain Robidoux	7
Bernie Mikkelsen	3
Jim Wych	7
Cliff Thorburn	5

Final; Best of 15 frames
Alain Robidoux	8
Jim Wych	4
