= Dave Gilbert (snooker player, born 1961) =

English snooker player

Personal information
- Born: 15 August 1961 (age 65) Bethnal Green, London

Sport
- Country: England
- Sport: Snooker
- Professional: 1985–1995
- Highest ranking: 57 (1988-1989)
- Best ranking finish: Last 16 (1987 International Open)

Dave Gilbert (born 15 August 1961) is an English former professional snooker player.

== Career ==
Gilbert was introduced to snooker by his father Les. In January 1977, Patsy Fagan hit the first maximum of his career, against Gilbert at the Clapton Bus Garage Social Club. He was later coached by Ron Shore at the Ilford Snooker Centre. In 1979, he defeated John Parrott to win the Pontins Junior title. In 1983, he beat Terry Whitbread in the final of the London Championship. He took up professional status in July 1985, and was a professional until 1995.

In the final round of qualifiers for the 1986 Snooker World Championship he lost 10-5 to Dave Martin. He made his television debut in 1987, in a match in which Gilbert defeated Cliff Wilson on the way to the last-16 of the 1987 International Open, before losing to Stephen Hendry. He finished 1987 ranked 82 in the world, but rose to a world ranking of number 57 in 1988. He reached the last-32 of both the 1988 and 1989 English Professional Championship, losing to Dean Reynolds and Joe Johnson, in those respective years. He beat former World Champion Dennis Taylor to reach the last-32 of the 1989 Asian Open. At the 1989 Snooker World Championship Gilbert lost 10-7 against Doug Mountjoy in the final round of qualifying before the Crucible Theatre section of the tournament.

== Personal life ==
He was born in Bethnal Green, London to Les and Brenda. His father Les was a London Transport bus driver. Gilbert worked at Smithfield meat market, and as an engraver at Hatton Garden, prior to becoming a professional snooker player. In 1980, he was involved in a head-on collision on the M6 near Stafford following a snooker tournament in Prestatyn in which his sister Sue was killed and required him to have a steel plate inserted into his left arm, and prevented him from being able again to straighten that arm from the elbow.

== Performance and rankings timeline ==
Tournament	1985/ 86	1986/ 87	1987/ 88	1988/ 89	1989/ 90	1990/ 91	1991/ 92	1992/ 93	1993/ 94	1994/ 95
Ranking (Note: It shows the ranking at the beginning of the season)	(Note: New players on the Main Tour don't have a ranking)	72	82	57	63	74	91	154	168	206
Ranking tournaments
Dubai Classic (Note: The event was also called the Dubai Masters (1988/1989))	Tournament Not Held			NR	LQ	LQ	LQ	A	LQ	A
Grand Prix	LQ	LQ	LQ	1R	1R	LQ	LQ	LQ	LQ	WD
UK Championship	LQ	LQ	LQ	1R	1R	LQ	LQ	LQ	LQ	WD
European Open	Tournament Not Held			1R	LQ	LQ	LQ	A	LQ	A
Welsh Open	Tournament Not Held						LQ	A	LQ	A
International Open (Note: The event was also called the Matchroom Trophy (1985/1986))	LQ	LQ	3R	LQ	LQ	Not Held		A	LQ	A
Thailand Open (Note: The event was also called the Thailand Masters (1985/1986-1986/1987, 1991/1992) and the Asian Open (1989/1990-1992/1993))	Non-Ranking		Not Held		2R	LQ	LQ	A	LQ	A
British Open	1R	LQ	1R	LQ	LQ	LQ	LQ	LQ	LQ	A
World Championship	LQ	LQ	WD	LQ	LQ	LQ	LQ	LQ	LQ	A
Non-ranking tournaments
The Masters	A	A	A	A	A	LQ	LQ	A	A	A
Former ranking tournaments
Canadian Masters	Non-Ranking Event			LQ	Tournament Not Held					
Hong Kong Open (Note: The event was also called the Australian Masters (1985/1986-1987/1988))	Non-Ranking Event			NH	1R	Tournament Not Held				NR
Classic	LQ	LQ	1R	LQ	LQ	LQ	LQ	Tournament Not Held		
Strachan Open	Tournament Not Held						LQ	MR	NR	NH
Former non-ranking tournaments
English Professional Championship	LQ	LQ	1R	1R	Tournament Not Held					
Shoot Out	Tournament Not Held					3R	Tournament Not Held			

Performance Table Legend
LQ	lost in the qualifying draw	#R	lost in the early rounds of the tournament (WR = Wildcard round, RR = Round robin)	QF	lost in the quarter-finals
SF	lost in the semi-finals	F	lost in the final	W	won the tournament
DNQ	did not qualify for the tournament	A	did not participate in the tournament	WD	withdrew from the tournament

NH / Not Held	means an event was not held.
NR / Non-Ranking Event	means an event is/was no longer a ranking event.
R / Ranking Event	means an event is/was a ranking event.
MR / Minor-Ranking Event	means an event is/was a minor-ranking event.

== Career finals ==
=== Non-ranking finals: 1 ===
Outcome	No.	Year	Championship	Opponent in the final	Score
Runner-up	1.	1989	WPBSA Non-Ranking - Event 2	(England) Ken Owers	6–9

=== Amateur finals: 2 (1 title) ===
Outcome	No.	Year	Championship	Opponent in the final	Score
Runner-up	1.	1979	British Under-19 Championship	(Republic of Ireland) Joe O'Boye	0–3
Winner	1.	1979	Pontins Junior Championship	(England) John Parrott	3–1
