= Alain Robidoux =

Canadian snooker player

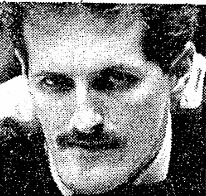
- Robidoux in 1988

Personal information
- Born: July 25, 1960 (age 66)

Sport
- Country: Canada
- Sport: Snooker
- Professional: 1987–2004
- Highest ranking: 9 (1996–1998)
- Maximum breaks: 1
- Best ranking finish: Runner-up (x1)

Alain Robidoux (born July 25, 1960) is a Canadian retired professional snooker player. Robidoux played on the sport's main tour from 1987 to 2004 and reached the final of the 1996 German Open, which he lost 7–9 to Ronnie O'Sullivan.

== Career ==
Robidoux was born on 25 July 1960 in Ste-Veronique, Quebec, Canada. He joined the professional snooker circuit in the 1987–88 snooker season as a "non-tournament" professional. This entitled him to play only in the World Championship. He amassed enough points in the 1988 World Championship qualifiers to finish in the top 128 players, which allowed him to join the tour full-time.

In September 1988, Robidoux became only the sixth player ever to record an officially ratified 147 maximum break, achieved in the qualifying rounds of the European Open. He won the Canadian Professional Championship by defeating Jim Wych 8–4 in the final. He reached the semi-finals of the Grand Prix in October 1988, where he won six consecutive frames from 1–8 down against Alex Higgins, but ultimately lost the match 7–9.

In the first round of the 1996 World Championship, Robidoux was beaten 3–10 by Ronnie O'Sullivan in a controversial match. Although predominantly right-handed, O'Sullivan played a number of shots with his left hand, and the behaviour was described by commentator John Virgo as O'Sullivan "taking the mick". The matter came to a head in the eleventh frame, when Robidoux was 2–8 down and he was declining to concede the frame, instead continuing to play for snookers despite a 43-point deficit with only the pink and black on the table. He refused to shake O'Sullivan's hand at the end of the match. In response, O'Sullivan claimed that he played better with his left hand than Robidoux could with his right. Realising that O'Sullivan was able to play equally well with both hands, Robidoux later apologised to him.

In the 1996–97 season, Robidoux reached the final of the 1996 German Open, but he lost 7–9 to O'Sullivan despite making a tournament-best 145 break. That same season, he progressed to the semi-finals of the 1997 World Snooker Championship, defeating Brian Morgan, Stefan Mazrocis and Lee Walker, before losing to eventual champion Ken Doherty. He finished the season 9th in the world rankings, which was to be his career-best ranking position. However he then endured a horrid 1997–98 season, losing all his matches and did not win a match again until the following season at the 1999 Welsh Open, where he reached the last 16.

He lost his professional status in 2004 after placing 102nd in the rankings. Robidoux blamed his decline on the destruction of his favourite cue, which he referred to as "the Eel". When he returned the cue to the man from whom he had bought it to have it mended, the man objected to Robidoux having fixed a sponsor's logo to the butt and smashed the cue to pieces. Several years later, Robidoux was asked whether the passage of time had eased his anger towards the cue maker; he responded "I want to kill him."

He has lived in Montreal since 1980. In 2026 he married Mananya Huantham.

== Performance and rankings timeline ==
Tournament	1987/ 88	1988/ 89	1989/ 90	1990/ 91	1991/ 92	1992/ 93	1993/ 94	1994/ 95	1995/ 96	1996/ 97	1997/ 98	1998/ 99	1999/ 00	2000/ 01	2001/ 02	2002/ 03	2003/ 04
Ranking	(Note: New players on the Main Tour do not have a ranking.)	102	35	16	13	14	18	32	20	14	9	12	36	49	78	77	91
Ranking tournaments
World Open (Note: The event ran under different names such as Grand Prix (1987/1988 to 2000/2001) and LG Cup (2001/2002 to 2003/2004).)	A	SF	3R	3R	3R	2R	2R	2R	3R	QF	1R	1R	WD	LQ	LQ	LQ	LQ
British Open	A	2R	3R	QF	QF	1R	2R	3R	1R	2R	1R	1R	LQ	LQ	LQ	LQ	LQ
UK Championship	A	1R	QF	2R	2R	1R	2R	2R	2R	QF	1R	1R	WD	LQ	1R	LQ	1R
Welsh Open	Tournament Not Held				1R	3R	1R	1R	1R	3R	1R	3R	WD	LQ	LQ	LQ	WD
European Open (Note: The event ran under different names such as European Open (1988/1989 to 1996/1997 and 2001/2002 to 2003/2004) and Irish Open (1998/1999).)	NH	3R	2R	1R	QF	2R	LQ	1R	LQ	2R	NH	1R	Not Held		LQ	LQ	LQ
Irish Masters	Non-Ranking Event															LQ	WD
Players Championship (Note: The event ran under different names such as International Open (1987/1988 to 1996/1997).)	A	2R	SF	Not held		1R	1R	3R	SF	1R	1R	1R	LQ	LQ	LQ	LQ	WD
World Championship	LQ	LQ	1R	2R	2R	1R	LQ	1R	1R	SF	1R	1R	LQ	LQ	LQ	LQ	LQ
Non-ranking tournaments
The Masters	A	A	A	WR	QF	1R	LQ	LQ	LQ	1R	1R	1R	A	A	A	A	A
Former ranking tournaments
Canadian Masters	NR	LQ	Tournament Not Held														
Hong Kong Open (Note: The event ran under different names as Australian Masters (1987/1988 and 1995/1996) and Australian Open (1994/1995).)	NR	NH	2R	Tournament Not Held				NR	NR	Tournament Not Held							
Classic	A	LQ	LQ	2R	3R	Tournament Not Held											
Strachan Open	Tournament Not Held				2R	MR	NR	Tournament Not Held									
Dubai Classic (Note: The event run under different names as Dubai Masters (1988/1989), Thailand Classic (1995/1996) and Asian Classic (1996/1997))	NH	NR	2R	2R	1R	1R	1R	QF	1R	2R	Tournament Not Held						
German Masters (Note: The event ran under different name as German Open (1995/1996 to 1997/1998).)	Tournament Not Held								LQ	F	1R	NR	Tournament Not Held				
China Open (Note: The event ran under different names as China International (1997/1998 and 1998/1999))	Tournament Not Held										NR	1R	WD	LQ	LQ	Not Held	
Thailand Masters (Note: The event ran under different names such as Asian Open (1989/1990 to 1992/1993) and Thailand Open (1993/1994 to 1996/1997).)	Not Held		LQ	1R	QF	1R	2R	1R	2R	2R	1R	2R	WD	LQ	LQ	NR	NH
Former non-ranking tournaments
Canadian Professional Championship	A	W	Tournament Not Held														
World Masters	Not Held			2R	Tournament Not Held												
Nescafe Extra Challenge	Not Held			RR	NH	A	Tournament Not Held										
Pontins Professional	A	A	A	A	QF	A	A	A	A	A	A	A	A	Tournament Not Held			
European Challenge	Tournament Not Held				QF	A	Tournament Not Held										
World Matchplay	NH	A	A	A	A	1R	Tournament Not Held										
Pot Black	A	A	A	A	A	QF	A	Tournament Not Held									
Charity Challenge	Tournament Not Held							A	A	1R	A	A	A	A	A	Not Held	
Malta Grand Prix	Tournament Not Held							A	A	SF	QF	A	R	A	Not Held		
Scottish Masters	A	NH	A	A	A	A	A	A	A	A	1R	A	A	A	A	A	NH

Performance Table Legend
LQ	lost in the qualifying draw	#R	lost in the early rounds of the tournament (WR = Wildcard round, RR = Round robin)	QF	lost in the quarter-finals
SF	lost in the semi–finals	F	lost in the final	W	won the tournament
DNQ	did not qualify for the tournament	A	did not participate in the tournament	WD	withdrew from the tournament

NH / Not Held	means an event was not held.
NR / Non-Ranking Event	means an event is/was no longer a ranking event.
R / Ranking Event	means an event is/was a ranking event.
MR / Minor-Ranking Event	means an event is/was a minor-ranking event.

== Career finals ==
=== Ranking finals: 1 ===
Outcome	No.	Year	Championship	Opponent in the final	Score
Runner-up	1.	1996	German Open	(England) Ronnie O'Sullivan	7–9

=== Non-ranking finals: 1 (1 title) ===
Outcome	No.	Year	Championship	Opponent in the final	Score
Winner	1.	1988	Canadian Professional Championship	(Canada) Jim Wych	8–4

=== Team finals: 1 (1 title) ===
Outcome	No.	Year	Championship	Team/partner	Opponent(s) in the final	Score
Winner	1.	1990	World Cup	Canada	Northern Ireland	9–5

=== Amateur finals: 7 (7 titles) ===
Outcome	No.	Year	Championship	Opponent in the final	Score
Winner	1.	1983	Canadian Amateur Championship	(Canada) Tom Finstad	9–3
Winner	2.	1985	Canadian Amateur Championship (2)	(Canada) Michael Sobala	9–6
Winner	3.	1987	Canadian Amateur Championship (3)	(Canada) Jeff White	7–1
Winner	4.	2003	Canadian Amateur Championship (4)	(Canada) Cliff Thorburn	6–2
Winner	5.	2004	Canadian Amateur Championship (5)	(Canada) Tom Finstad	6–2
Winner	6.	2006	Canadian Amateur Championship (6)	(Canada) John White	6–2
Winner	7.	2009	Canadian Amateur Championship (7)	(Canada) John White	6–1
