= Colin Roscoe =

Welsh snooker player

Personal information
- Born: 30 June 1945 (age 81) Connah's Quay, Flintshire

Sport
- Country: Wales
- Sport: Snooker
- Professional: 1981–1995
- Highest ranking: 39 (1984/1985)
- Best ranking finish: Quarter-final (x1)

Colin Roscoe (born 30 June 1945 in Connah's Quay, Flintshire) is a Welsh former professional snooker player.

== Career ==
Born on 30 June 1945 in Connah's Quay, Flintshire, Roscoe won the Welsh Amateur Championship in 1981 and soon after turned professional. He reached his highest ranking of 39th for the 1984/1985 season, and progressed to the last 32 stage of ten ranking tournaments in the following eight years.

Roscoe first made any notable progress at the 1982 International Open, where he defeated John Dunning and Doug French but lost 0–5 to Steve Davis in the last 32. Two years later, he reached the last 16 at the 1984 Classic, losing 2–5 to Terry Griffiths. He won three matches to appear in the last 32 at the 1988 Classic, eliminating Paul Watchorn, Wayne Jones and Eddie Charlton before losing 0–5 to Tony Knowles.

Last-32 finishes at three ranking events followed in the 1988/1989 season. At the 1988 Canadian Masters, Roscoe lost 1–5 to David Taylor; the 1988 UK Championship ended with a 3–9 defeat to Stephen Hendry, the 1989 British Open a 3–5 loss to Tony Meo. Roscoe's 1989 World Championship campaign began and finished with a 9–10 first-round qualifying defeat to Jack Fitzmaurice.

At the 1989 Asian Open, Roscoe defeated Barry Pinches and Jimmy White before losing 4–5 to Peter Francisco in the last 32; later that season, he reached his first ranking event quarter-final at the 1990 European Open in France. There, he was victorious over Mark Wildman, Francisco, John Virgo and Nick Dyson, exiting 2–5 to Steve James. Two last-32 finishes followed in the 1990/1991 season, as well as a run to the last 16 at the 1991 British Open, where Roscoe lost 3–5 to Steve Davis.

Roscoe slipped out of the top 64 in the rankings in 1993. During the 1993/1994 season, he won only one match – 5–4 against David Rippon in that season's Grand Prix – and lost 3–10 to Dominic Dale in his first match at the 1994 World Championship. Having dropped to 136th by the season's end, he did not play as a professional again.
