= Nigel Gilbert (snooker player) =

English snooker player

Personal information
- Born: 20 March 1959 (age 67) London, England

Sport
- Country: England
- Sport: Snooker
- Professional: 1986–1997, 1998–2001
- Highest ranking: 44 (1994–1995)
- Best ranking finish: Quarter-final (x1)

Nigel Gilbert (born 20 March 1959) is an English former professional snooker player, famous for wearing a glove on his bridging hand while playing.

== Career ==
Gilbert turned professional in 1986 at the age of 27, and made his first appearance in the latter stages of a tournament at the 1987 International Open. There, he defeated Ian Black 5–3, Jack McLaughlin 5–4, Murdo MacLeod 5–1 and Wayne Jones 5–4, before losing 0–5 to veteran Australian Eddie Charlton in the last 16.

The following year, Gilbert reached the quarter-final of the 1988 Grand Prix, where he beat Bill Oliver 5–4, Silvino Francisco 5–4, Eddie Charlton 5–0 in a reverse of the previous year's encounter, and Tony Knowles 5–4 before losing 4–5 to Alain Robidoux.

His best performance at the World Championship came in 1990, where he lost in the last 32 to Terry Griffiths 4–10, having at one point led Griffiths 3–2.

Despite poor form in the first half of the 1990s, Gilbert reached a career-high ranking of 44th in 1994; he retained this position for a year, but having not reached the last 16 of a ranking event since the 1991 Dubai Classic, he slipped to 111th at the end of the 1996–97 season and was relegated from the tour. He won back his place after one season, but was unable to rise higher than 119th, and lost his professional status for the final time in 2001, aged 42.

He was known for wearing a glove on his bridging hand while playing.
