= Nick Terry =

English snooker player

Personal information
- Born: 15 September 1967 (age 59)

Sport
- Country: England
- Sport: Snooker
- Professional: 1988–1997, 1998–2001
- Highest ranking: 38 (1994–1995)
- Best ranking finish: Last 16 (x1)

Nick Terry (born 15 September 1967) is an English former professional snooker player.

== Career ==
Terry turned professional in 1988, by defeating Maurice Parkin 10-5 in a play-off, after finishing third in the pro-ticket series. He lost his first professional match, at the 1988 International Open, 2–5 to Colin Roscoe. In his first season, Terry reached the last 32 of the 1989 Classic, where he led Doug Mountjoy 4–3 but lost 4–5. In the 1991–92 season, he reached the last 32 in two events - the 1991 UK Championship, where he lost 7–9 to Neal Foulds having led 5–1 and 6–3, and the 1992 European Open, where Martin Clark defeated him 5–3.

More last-32 runs followed in the next season; in the 1992 Grand Prix, Foulds again defeated him, this time 5–2, while in the 1993 British Open, Terry lost 3–5 to John Higgins. Terry won three matches at the 1994 Welsh Open, where but lost in the last 16, 4–5 to Jimmy White. At the International Open of that year, he was whitewashed 5–0 in the last 32 by Stephen Hendry. Terry qualified for the main stages of the 1996 World Championship, beating Steve Judd, Stephen Murphy and Dean Reynolds before meeting Ken Doherty in the last 32. Terry lost 5–10.

Having finished the 1996–97 season 68th in the world rankings, Terry was forced to enter the qualifying events in the next season to regain his professional status. Those performances were sufficient, and he returned to the tour in 1998; however, he could not recover his top-64 place and left the professional ranks once more in 2001.
