= Jason Prince =

Northern Irish snooker player (born 1970)

Personal information
- Born: 17 June 1970 (age 56) Derry, Northern Ireland

Sport
- Country: Northern Ireland
- Sport: Snooker
- Professional: 1990–2004
- Highest ranking: 39 (1998–1999)
- Maximum breaks: 1
- Best ranking finish: Last 16 (x5)

Jason Prince (born 17 June 1970 from Derry) is a Northern Irish former professional snooker player.

== Career ==
Born on 17 June 1970, Prince turned professional in 1990, having defeated Fred Davis 10–5 to qualify from the professional play-offs. During his first season, he reached the last 16 of the 1990 Dubai Classic, leading Dean Reynolds 4–2 but losing 4–5, and defeated John Spencer 5–4 en route to the last 64 of the 1991 Classic. Later that season, Prince beat Davis in qualifying for the 1991 World Championship, the 10–4 defeat for Davis coming near the end of a professional career which lasted sixty-two years, and went on to defeat Ray Reardon 10–5 in the next round; Reardon, who was Prince's favourite player as a child, never played another match in competition.

Prince failed to reach the highest echelons of the game; his best position in the world rankings was 39th, and he spent much of the 1990s in the lower half of the top 64. He appeared in the last 32 of the 1998 World Championship, losing 8–10 to Darren Morgan, and following the 1990 Dubai Classic, reached the last 16 in another four tournaments.

Although he made a maximum break in losing to Ian Brumby in qualifying for the 1999 British Open, Prince's form dipped in the 1998–99 season, and never recovered; he fell out of the top 64 in 2000, finished the 2003–04 season ranked 98th and thereafter lost his professional status, aged 33. He hit another 147 when playing as an amateur near his house in Birstall, West Yorkshire in 2017.
