= Danny Fowler =

English snooker player

Personal information
- Born: 30 July 1956 (age 70) Worksop

Sport
- Country: England
- Sport: Snooker
- Professional: 1984–1997
- Highest ranking: 28 (1990–1992)
- Best ranking finish: Semi-final (x2)

Danny Fowler (born 30 July 1956 in Worksop) is an English former professional snooker player.

== Early life ==
Danny Fowler was born on 30 July 1956 in Worksop. Fowler played snooker recreationally from the age of 15 to 20, but then stopped playing for several years. He then started playing again, and turned professional in 1984 despite a lack of notable amateur championship success. Before becoming a professional player, he worked as a miner and as a local government waste collector.

== Career ==
Fowler started his professional career by whitewashing Bob Chaperon, Roy Andrewartha and Dave Martin all 5–0 in the qualifying rounds of the 1984 International Open before being whitewashed himself by Dennis Taylor, 0–5 in the first round. At the end of the season, he recorded 10–0 wins over both John Hargreaves and Jim Donnelly in the qualifying 1985 World Snooker Championship before being next out in the next qualifying round, 2–10 to John Parrott, and finished his debut professional season ranked 55th for the snooker world rankings 1985/1986.

He defeated Bill Werbeniuk 5-1 to reach the last-32 of the 1985 Grand Prix where he made his televised debut in defeat to Steve Davis. He made his debut at The Crucible at the 1986 World Snooker Championship, losing 2-10 to Terry Griffiths, but his world ranking rose to a then career high of number 33 at the end of the season.

His best ranking tournament finishes were both in the 1989–90 snooker season, when he reached the semi-final stages of the 1989 Grand Prix and the 1989 Dubai Classic.

At the 1993 World Championship, Fowler played the defending two-time World Champion Stephen Hendry in the first round but lost 1–10.

Fowler's highest professional ranking was 28, a position he held in 1990/1991 and 1991/1992. At the end of the 1996–97 snooker season he was ranked 114th and did not compete professionally again. He later became a courier for a company that sold maggots. He later managed a Snooker club In Worksop for a short period at the end of the 1990s.
