= 1992–93 snooker world rankings =

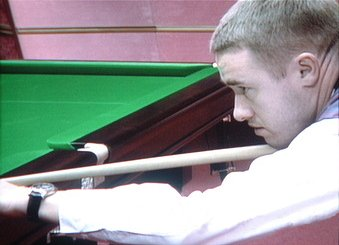
Stephen Hendry (pictured in 2003) retained his position at the top of the ranking list.

There were eighteen ranking events taken into consideration for the 1992–93 snooker world rankings: eight from the 1990–91 snooker season and ten from the 1991–92 snooker season. The 1992–93 ranking list was published after the conclusion of the 1992 World Snooker Championship. The rankings were then used during the 1992–93 snooker season for seeding the draw for tournaments. The reigning champion for any tournament would be automatically seeded first, the current world champion seeded second (if not already seeded first), and the other seedings were based on the order of the ranking list.

The World Professional Billiards and Snooker Association (WPBSA), the governing body for professional snooker, first introduced a ranking system for professional players in 1976. Initially, the rankings were based on performances in the preceding three world championships. The 1983–84 snooker world rankings were the first to take tournaments other than the world championship into account and several additional tournaments were designated as ranking tournaments over the following years.

In July 1990, the WPBSA decided to open membership to any person aged at least 16 who paid a membership fee of £500 and an annual subscription fee of £100. With 443 players joining for the 1991–92 snooker season, the total number of professional players rose to 611. The largest number of entrants for a ranking tournament in 1991–92 was 509, for the UK championship.

For the 1992–93 season, 1992 World Champion Stephen Hendry retained his number one rank for the third consecutive year. John Parrott moved to second from fourth, swapping places with Steve Davis, and Jimmy White remained third. The top 16 in the rankings were regarded as the elite players, and received invitations to the Masters and automatic qualification to the last-32 round of the World Snooker Championship. In tournaments other than the World Championship, players ranked up to 32 received automatic qualification into the last-64 round of ranking tournaments.

Alan McManus became the first two-season professional to reach the top 16 since Tony Knowles ten years earlier. James Wattana, Nigel Bond and Darren Morgan entered the top 16 for the first time, and Willie Thorne rejoined. The players to drop out of the top 16 were Knowles, Mike Hallett, Dean Reynolds, Tony Jones and Doug Mountjoy. Of the players who had been a professional for only one season, Peter Ebdon was the highest-placed at 47th, followed by Paul Davies at 48th and Joe Swail who was 53rd. The 240 players with any type of points were ranked based on their points total; players without points were ranked based on their performances in 1991–92.

== Points tariff and basis of ranking ==
The points tariff for the 1992–93 snooker world rankings was:

1991 World Championship
Round	Points
Champion	10
Runner-up	8
Losing semi-finalist	6
Losing quarter-finalist	4
Last-16 loser	2
Last-32 loser	1 ranking point or 2 merit points (Note: Players who qualified received a ranking point. Players exempted until this round received two merit points.)
Last-48 loser	2 merit points
Last-64 loser	1 merit point
Last-96 loser	1 A point
Last-128 loser	Frames won counted

Other ranking tournaments 1990–91
Round	Points
Champion	6
Runner-up	5
Losing semi-finalist	4
Losing quarter-finalist	3
Last-16 loser	2
Last-32 loser	1
Last-64 loser	1 merit point
Last-96 loser	1 A point
Last-128 loser	Frames won counted

1992 World Championship
Round	Points
Champion	10
Runner-up	8
Losing semi-finalist	6
Losing quarter-finalist	4
Last-16 loser	2
Last-32 loser	1 ranking point or 2 merit points
Last-48 loser	2 merit points
Last-64 loser	1 merit point
Last-96 loser	1 A point
Last-128 loser	Frames won counted

Other ranking tournaments 1991–92
Round	Points
Champion	6
Runner-up	5
Losing semi-finalist	4
Losing quarter-finalist	3
Last-16 loser	2
Last-32 loser	1
Last-64 loser	1 merit point
Last-96 loser	1 A point
Last-128 loser	Frames won counted

Ranking was determined as follows:

- By number of ranking points
- For players with an equal number of ranking points, precedence was given to the player that earned the most ranking points in the later season.
- If players were still equal, merit points were considered. If they were still tied, precedence was given to the player with the higher number of merit points in the later season.
- If players were still equal, A points were considered. If they were still tied, precedence was given to the player with the higher number of A points in the later season.
- If players were still equal, frames won were considered. If they were still tied, precedence was given to the player with the better performance in the most recent world championship.

== Rankings ==
=== Rankings 1–240 ===
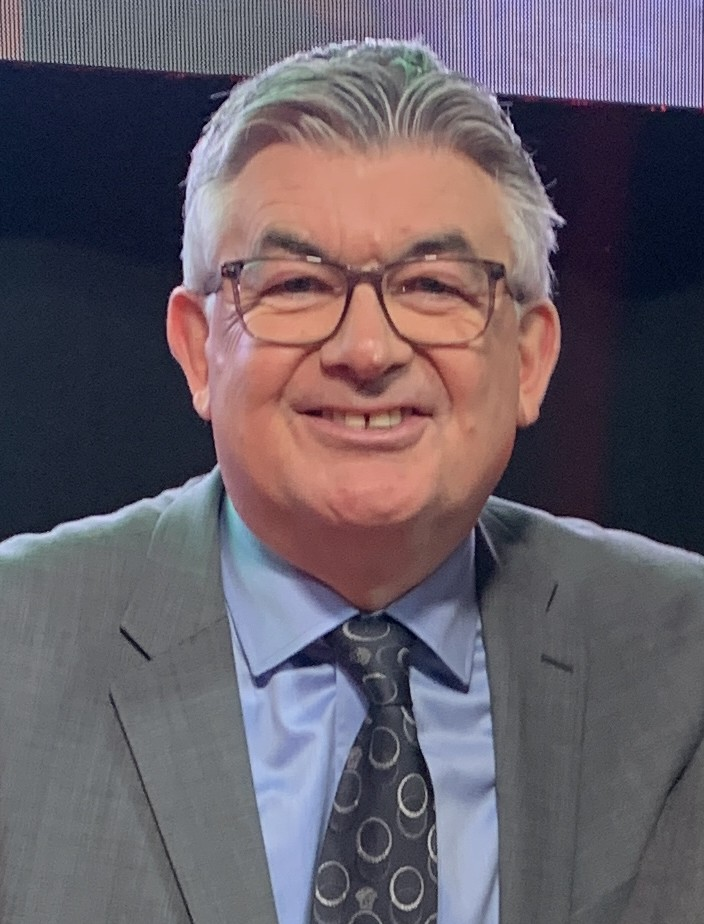
John Parrott (pictured in 2025) remained in second place.

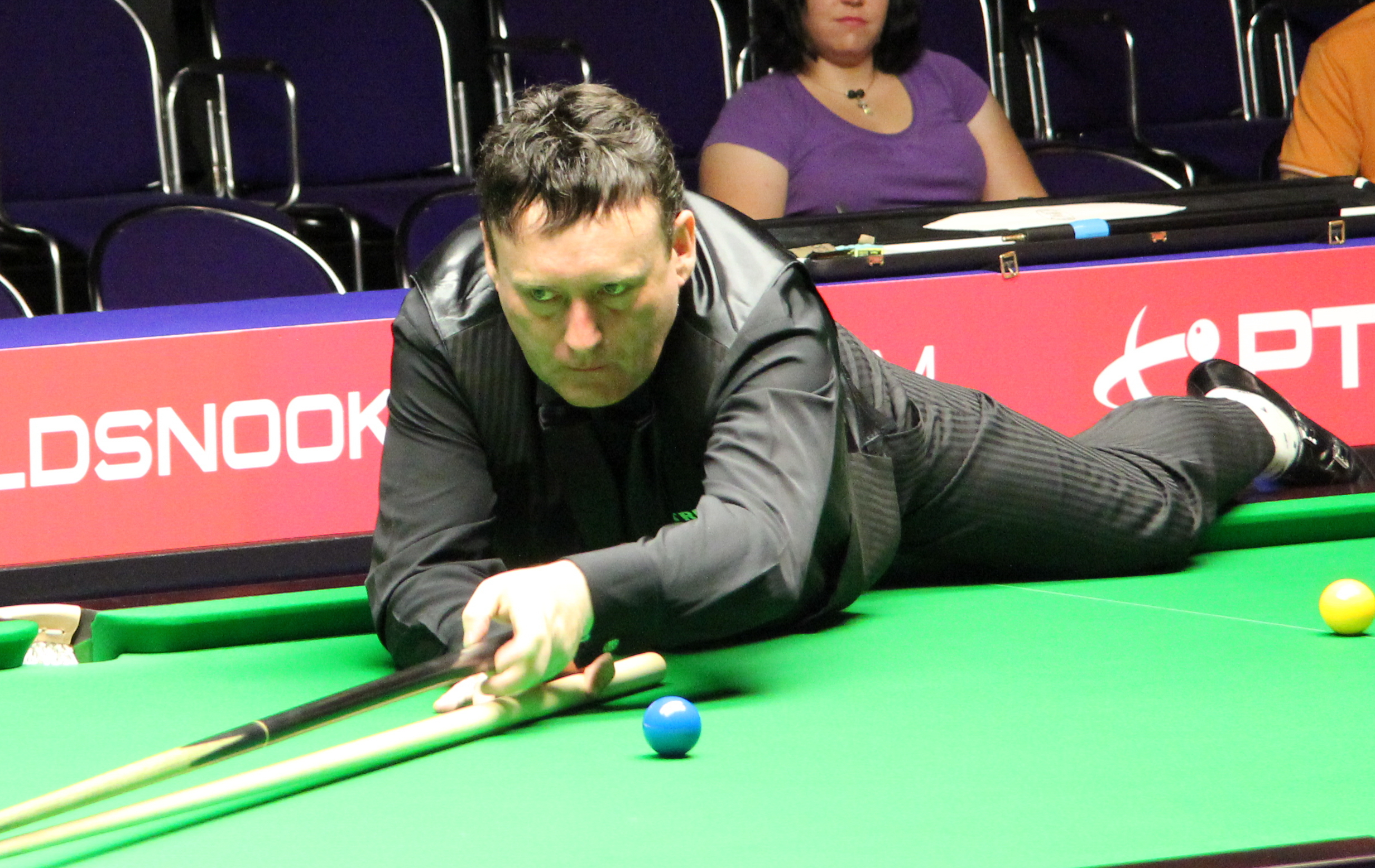
Jimmy White (pictured in 2011) ranked third, as in the previous season.

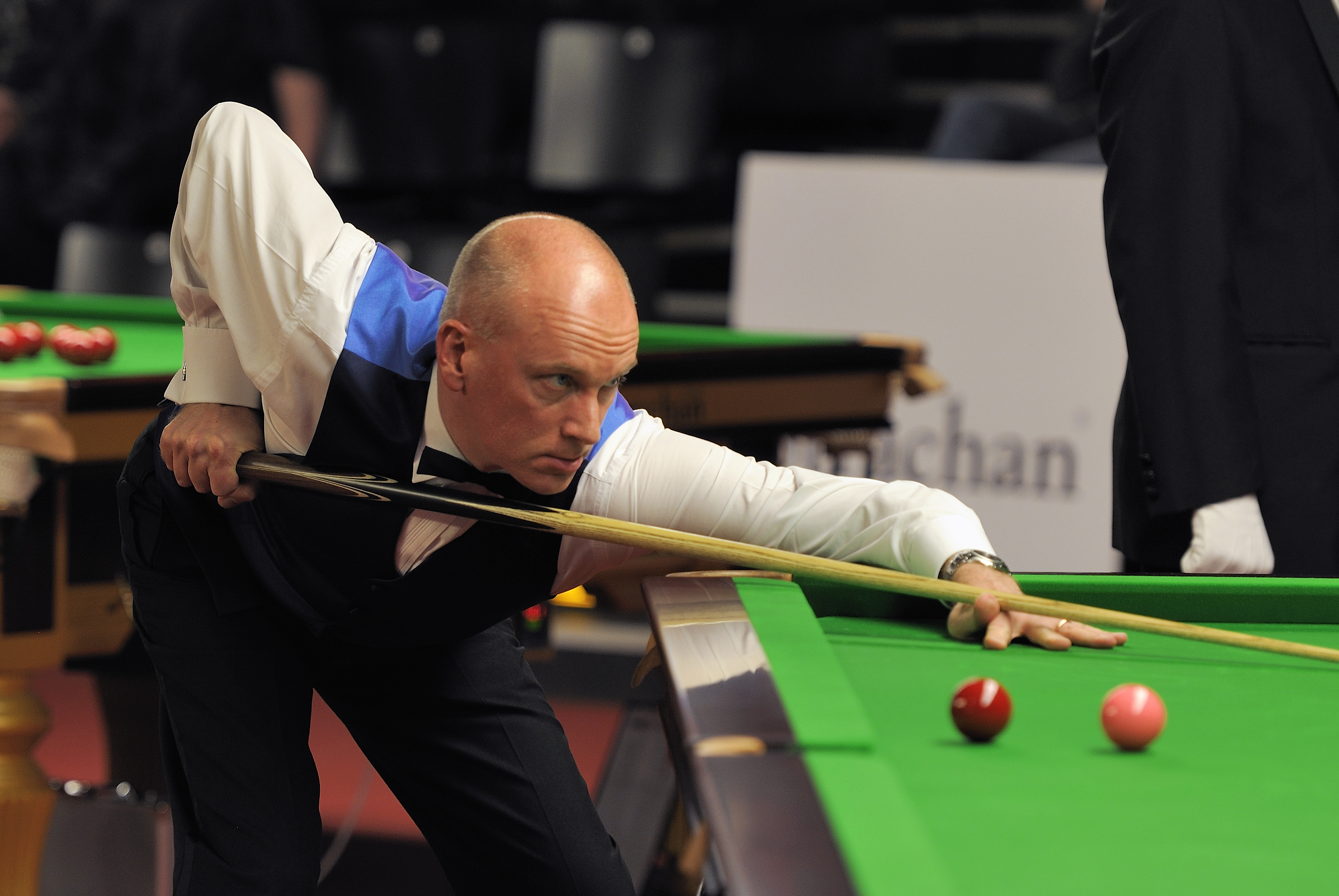
Peter Ebdon (pictured in 2011) was the highest-ranked of the one-season professionals.

Snooker world rankings 1992–93
Ranking	Name	Ranking points	Merit points	A points	Frames
1	Stephen Hendry (SCO)	78	1	–	–
2	John Parrott (ENG)	56	4	–	–
3	Jimmy White (ENG)	55	3	–	–
4	Steve Davis (ENG)	52	4	–	–
5	Neal Foulds (ENG)	37	1	–	–
6	Terry Griffiths (WAL)	36	3	–	–
7	James Wattana (THA)	35	4	1	–
8	Gary Wilkinson (ENG)	32	5	–	–
9	Nigel Bond (ENG)	31	6	2	–
10	Steve James (ENG)	30	6	–	–
11	Dennis Taylor (NIR)	30	5	–	–
12	Martin Clark (ENG)	29	2	–	–
13	Alan McManus (SCO)	27	6	2	6
14	Alain Robidoux (CAN)	27	4	–	–
15	Willie Thorne (ENG)	25	6	–	–
16	Darren Morgan (WAL)	24	5	1	–
17	Mike Hallett (ENG)	24	10	–	–
18	Dene O'Kane (NZL)	23	7	–	–
19	Dean Reynolds (ENG)	23	7	–	–
20	Tony Knowles (ENG)	21	7	–	–
21	Ken Doherty (IRL)	20	4	3	3
22	Tony Jones (ENG)	20	8	2	–
23	Joe Johnson (ENG)	19	8	–	–
24	Tony Drago (MLT)	18	8	–	–
25	Peter Francisco (RSA)	17	7	–	–
26	Doug Mountjoy (WAL)	16	11	–	–
27	Mark Bennett (WAL)	15	7	1	–
28	Silvino Francisco (RSA)	15	9	–	–
29	Eddie Charlton (AUS)	15	6	–	–
30	Danny Fowler (ENG)	13	11	–	–
31	Mark Johnston-Allen (ENG)	13	6	8	–
32	David Roe (ENG)	11	7	6	–
33	Cliff Wilson (WAL)	11	11	–	–
34	Wayne Jones (WAL)	11	11	–	–
35	Mick Price (ENG)	10	8	4	4
36	Cliff Thorburn (CAN)	9	13	1	–
37	Steve Newbury (WAL)	9	12	–	–
38	Tony Meo (ENG)	9	8	4	–
39	Brady Gollan (CAN)	9	3	10	–
40	Bob Chaperon (CAN)	8	12	–	–
41	Jason Prince (NIR)	8	5	5	5
42	Franky Chan (HKG)	8	3	9	9
43	Jim Wych (CAN)	7	7	9	–
44	Jonathan Birch (ENG)	7	7	5	3
45	Rod Lawler (ENG)	7	6	7	–
46	Ian Graham (ENG)	7	5	9	–
47	Peter Ebdon (ENG)	6	4	1	–
48	Paul Davies (ENG)	6	1	1	7
49	John Virgo (ENG)	6	15	–	–
50	Nigel Gilbert (ENG)	6	8	6	–
51	Colin Roscoe (WAL)	6	4	9	–
52	Tony Chappel (WAL)	6	7	8	–
53	Joe Swail (NIR)	5	1	1	6
54	Jack McLaughlin (NIR)	5	6	9	–
55	Eugene Hughes (IRL)	5	5	10	–
56	Stephen Murphy (IRL)	4	3	5	22
57	Barry West (ENG)	4	9	7	–
58	Les Dodd (ENG)	4	8	9	–
59	Kirk Stevens (CAN)	4	7	6	12
60	John Campbell (AUS)	4	5	10	–
61	Brian Morgan (ENG)	3	5	10	–
62	Jason Ferguson (ENG)	3	4	4	15
63	David Finbow (ENG)	3	–	2	–
64	John Read (ENG)	3	–	1	1
65	Steve Campbell (ENG)	3	3	5	21
66	Jim Chambers (ENG)	3	2	13	–
67	Warren King (AUS)	3	9	6	–
68	Nick Dyson (ENG)	3	4	10	2
69	Rex Williams (ENG)	3	9	8	–
70	Andy Hicks (ENG)	2	4	1	–
71	Nick Terry (ENG)	2	3	6	12
72	Alex Higgins (NIR)	2	1	2	6
73	Peter Lines (ENG)	2	1	1	4
74	Billy Snaddon (SCO)	2	–	1	–
75	Chris Small (SCO)	2	–	–	–
76	Andrew Cairns (ENG)	2	8	5	10
77	Robert Marshall (ENG)	2	7	9	–
78	Duncan Campbell (SCO)	2	5	3	28
79	Ken Owers (ENG)	2	4	8	20
80	Craig Edwards (ENG)	2	3	13	–
81	Robby Foldvari (AUS)	2	3	6	33
82	Jason Whittaker (ENG)	2	3	4	25
83	Brian Rowswell (ENG)	1	4	8	9
84	Steve Duggan (ENG)	1	4	13	–
85	Anthony Hamilton (ENG)	1	3	1	2
86	Marcel Gauvreau (CAN)	1	3	3	30
87	Drew Henry (SCO)	1	2	3	–
88	Stuart Reardon (ENG)	1	2	1	–
89	Jamie Woodman (ENG)	1	2	–	–
90	Dave Martin (ENG)	1	1	1	23
91	Paul McPhillips (SCO)	1	1	–	5
92	Peter Daubney (ENG)	1	–	2	4
93	Dave Harold (ENG)	1	–	2	–
94	Anthony Davies (WAL)	1	–	1	4
95	Amrik Cheema (IND)	1	–	1	–
96	David McDonnell (IRL)	1	–	–	13
97	Mehmet Husnu (CYP)	1	–	–	4
98	Jason Weston (ENG)	1	–	–	–
99	Bob Harris (ENG)	1	6	5	12
100	Murdo MacLeod (SCO)	1	5	7	6
101	Joe O'Boye (IRL)	1	4	5	4
102	Gary Natale (CAN)	1	2	5	28
103	Barry Pinches (ENG)	1	2	9	14
104	David Taylor (ENG)	–	11	7	–
105	Mark Rowing (ENG)	–	7	11	–
106	Tony Wilson (IOM)	–	7	6	20
107	Joe Grech (MLT)	–	7	3	16
108	Bill Oliver (ENG)	–	6	3	22
109	Jon Wright (ENG)	–	6	2	21
110	Jason Smith (ENG)	–	6	5	16
111	Ray Edmonds (ENG)	–	6	3	25
112	Paddy Browne (IRL)	–	5	9	5
113	Chris Cookson (ENG)	–	5	2	28
114	Martin Smith (ENG)	–	4	5	28
115	Paul Medati (ENG)	–	3	8	18
116	Roger Bales (ENG)	–	3	2	33
117	Mario Morra (CAN)	–	3	7	18
118	Karl Payne (ENG)	–	2	–	5
119	Mark Davis (ENG)	–	2	–	5
120	Shaun Mellish (ENG)	–	2	–	–
121	Troy Shaw (ENG)	–	2	–	–
122	Paul Gibson (ENG)	–	2	5	27
123	Steve Longworth (ENG)	–	2	8	17
124	John Rea (SCO)	–	2	6	9
125	Ian Williamson (ENG)	–	2	4	22
126	Graham Cripsey (ENG)	–	2	1	23
127	Ian Brumby (ENG)	–	1	5	24
128	Euan Henderson (SCO)	–	1	4	–
129	Tony Kearney (IRL)	–	1	3	21
130	Malcolm Bradley (ENG)	–	1	3	14
131	Mick Fisher (ENG)	–	1	3	14
132	Jimmy Michie (ENG)	–	1	2	–
133	Terry Murphy (NIR)	–	1	1	7
134	Colin Morton (ENG)	–	1	1	3
135	Paul Tanner (ENG)	–	1	1	–
136	Gary Lees (ENG)	–	1	1	–
137	Joe Delaney (IRL)	–	1	1	–
138	Bradley Jones (ENG)	–	1	1	–
139	Craig MacGillivray (SCO)	–	1	1	–
140	Terry Whitthread (ENG)	–	1	1	26
141	Karl Broughton (ENG)	–	1	–	8
142	Sean Lynskey (ENG)	–	1	–	5
143	Shokat Ali (PAK)	–	1	–	4
144	Stefan Mazrocis (ENG)	–	1	–	4
145	Sam Chong (MYS)	–	1	–	1
146	Mark Evans (ENG)	–	1	–	–
147	Sean Storey (ENG)	–	1	–	–
148	Jeff Cundy (ENG)	–	1	–	–
149	Steve Prest (ENG)	–	1	–	–
150	Tommy Murphy (NIR)	–	1	5	30
151	Steve Meakin (ENG)	–	1	4	16
152	Graham Miles (ENG)	–	1	3	24
153	Pat Houlihan (ENG)	–	1	3	12
154	Dave Gilbert (ENG)	–	–	8	24
155	John Spencer (ENG)	–	–	8	1
156	Anthony Harris (ENG)	–	–	7	31
157	Eddie Sinclair (SCO)	–	–	6	16
158	George Scott (ENG)	–	–	4	8
159	Matt Gibson (SCO)	–	–	3	31
160	Mike Darrington (ENG)	–	–	3	13
161	Steve Judd (ENG)	–	–	2	4
162	Kevin Ashby (ENG)	–	–	2	–
163	John Dunning (ENG)	–	–	2	14
164	Paul Watchorn (IRL)	–	–	2	10
165	Vic Harris (ENG)	–	–	2	10
166	Jack Fitzmaurice (ENG)	–	–	2	10
167	Dessie Sheehan (IRL)	–	–	1	11
168	Bjørn L'Orange (NOR)	–	–	1	6
169	Guy Dennis (ENG)	–	–	1	6
170	Paul Cavney (ENG)	–	–	1	3
171	Frank Dezi (ENG)	–	–	1	3
172	Mark Boyd (ENG)	–	–	1	3
173	Nick Walker (ENG)	–	–	1	3
174	Robert Foxall (ENG)	–	–	1	2
175	Dave Rippon (ENG)	–	–	1	1
176	David Grimwood (ENG)	–	–	1	1
177	Leigh Griffin (ENG)	–	–	1	–
178	Pat Kenny (ENG)	–	–	1	–
179	Nic Barrow (ENG)	–	–	1	–
180	Daniel Murphy (ENG)	–	–	1	–
181	Paul Webb (ENG)	–	–	1	–
182	Tony Rampello (ENG)	–	–	1	–
183	Sergio Beggiato (ENG)	–	–	1	–
184	Adrian Rosa (ENG)	–	–	1	–
185	Oliver King (ENG)	–	–	1	–
186	Gino Rigitano (CAN)	–	–	1	18
187	Ray Reardon (WAL)	–	–	1	17
188	Billy Kelly (IRL)	–	–	1	4
189	Mike Watterson (ENG)	–	–	1	1
190	Fred Davis (ENG)	–	–	1	–
191	Jim Donnelly (SCO)	–	–	–	28
192	Fergal O'Brien (IRL)	–	–	–	11
193	Robbie Grace (RSA)	–	–	–	10
194	Derek Heaton (ENG)	–	–	–	9
195	Kieran McAlinden (NIR)	–	–	–	8
196	Mark Pugh (ENG)	–	–	–	8
197	Alan Peacock (ENG)	–	–	–	8
198	Brian Cassidy (ENG)	–	–	–	8
199	Simon Haggerty (SCO)	–	–	–	7
200	Alan Trigg (ENG)	–	–	–	7
201	Eddie Manning (ENG)	–	–	–	6
202	Sean Lanigan (ENG)	–	–	–	5
203	Karl Burrows (ENG)	–	–	–	4
204	Peter Donegan (ENG)	–	–	–	4
205	Darren Clarke (ENG)	–	–	–	4
206	Steve Ventham (ENG)	–	–	–	4
207	Graham Horne (SCO)	–	–	–	4
208	Jason Pegram (ENG)	–	–	–	4
209	Mark King (ENG)	–	–	–	4
210	Steve Mifsud (AUS)	–	–	–	4
211	Darryn Walker (ENG)	–	–	–	4
212	Anthony O'Connor (IRL)	–	–	–	3
213	Robert Chapman (ENG)	–	–	–	3
214	Dale Milton (ENG)	–	–	–	3
215	Leigh Robinson (ENG)	–	–	–	3
216	Steve Russell (ENG)	–	–	–	3
217	Nick Fruin (ENG)	–	–	–	3
218	Michael Stocks (ENG)	–	–	–	3
219	Paul Dawkins (WAL)	–	–	–	3
220	Richard Moore (ENG)	–	–	–	3
221	Mukesh Parmar (ENG)	–	–	–	3
222	Paul Thornley (CAN)	–	–	–	3
223	Wayne Rendle (ENG)	–	–	–	2
224	Stuart Parnell (ENG)	–	–	–	2
225	Mark Flowerdew (ENG)	–	–	–	2
226	Roger Leighton (ENG)	–	–	–	2
227	Dermot McGlinchey (NIR)	–	–	–	2
228	David Langton (ENG)	–	–	–	2
229	Lee Grant (ENG)	–	–	–	2
230	Kevin Young (ENG)	–	–	–	2
231	Bill Werbeniuk (CAN)	–	–	–	2
232	Dennis Hughes (ENG)	–	–	–	2
233	Christopher Shilton (ENG)	–	–	–	1
234	Steve Lemmens (BEL)	–	–	–	1
235	Paul Wykes (ENG)	–	–	–	1
236	Graham Macdonald (ENG)	–	–	–	1
237	Frank Maskell (ENG)	–	–	–	1
238	Bert Demarco (SCO)	–	–	–	1
239	Mark Wildman (ENG)	–	–	–	1
240	Ian Black (SCO)	–	–	–	1

=== Rankings 241–546 ===
Players who had not earned any points were ranked based on their performances in 1991–92. These rankings were calculated using the points that each player would have received under the new ranking system introduced by the WPBSA for the 1993–94 snooker world rankings, had it been in place at the time.

Snooker world rankings 1992–93
Seeding	Name	"New" points
241	Alex Borg (MLT)	837.500
242	Barrie Bunn (ENG)	818.750
243	Jason Wallace (ENG)	700.000
244	Simon Parker (ENG)	687.500
245	Marcus Campbell (SCO)	650.000
246	Tom Finstad (CAN)	646.875
247	Vince McCluskey (ENG)	621.875
248	Will Jerram (ENG)	587.500
249	John White (CAN)	584.375
250	Robert Dickson (ENG)	531.250
251	Darren Guest (ENG)	525.000
252	Dean Venables (ENG)	525.000
253	Peter Gilchrist (ENG)	503.125
254	David Coles (ENG)	490.625
255	Dylan Leary (NIR)	484.375
256	James Long (IRL)	478.125
257	Craig Johnston-Allen (ENG)	471.875
258	Graham Fisken (ENG)	471.875
259	Carl Groves (ENG)	468.750
260	Darren Hackeson (ENG)	453.125
261	Simon Morris (ENG)	450.000
262	John Timson (ENG)	450.000
263	Robert Tavagna (AUS)	446.875
264	Bernard Bennett (ENG)	437.500
265	Surinder Gill (ENG)	437.500
266	John Burns (ENG)	434.375
267	Paul Morgan (ENG)	428.125
268	Roy Connor (ENG)	421.875
269	Brian Cakebread (ENG)	415.625
270	Wayne Martin (ENG)	412.500
271	Craig Newson (ENG)	412.500
272	Stephen O'Connor (IRL)	406.250
273	Stuart Swinburn (ENG)	393.750
274	Chris Palmer (ENG)	387.500
275	Richy McDonald (SCO)	375.000
276	Stacey Hillyard (ENG)	362.625
277	Jason Walton (ENG)	362.500
278	Julian Goodyear (ENG)	356.250
279	Matthew McGrotty (ENG)	356.250
280	Richard Pincott (ENG)	353.125
281	Paul Roulston (ENG)	350.000
282	Gary Filtness (ENG)	346.875
283	Cary Kikis (ENG)	346.875
284	Lee Richardson (ENG)	343.750
285	John Welsh (ENG)	337.500
286	David McLellan (SCO)	334.375
287	Micky Wareham (ENG)	334.375
288	Michael Gold (ENG)	331.250
289	Antony Bolsover (ENG)	315.625
290	Paul Smith (ENG)	306.250
291	Pete Seager (ENG)	303.125
292	Anton Bishop (ENG)	303.125
293	Chris Nicholson (ENG)	296.875
294	Hassan Vaizie (ENG)	296.875
295	Stuart Henderson (ENG)	293.750
296	Garry Baldrey (ENG)	287.500
297	Paul Maskell (ENG)	287.500
298	Wayne Lloyd (WAL)	287.500
299	Michael Huntingdon (ENG)	278.125
300	Neil Figgins (ENG)	275.000
301	Daniel Smith (ENG)	275.000
302	Mark Elliott (ENG)	265.625
303	Anthony Buckley (ENG)	262.500
304	Jason Hawen (ENG)	259.375
305	Terrance Burke (ENG)	259.375
306	Chris Barnett (ENG)	259.375
307	Michael Leach (ENG)	256.250
308	Louis Fazekas (CAN)	253.125
309	John Leahy (IRL)	253.125
310	David Rice (ENG)	250.000
311	Gaye Burns (IRL)	250.000
312	Daryl Peach (ENG)	246.875
313	Steve Elliott (ENG)	237.500
314	John Manley (ENG)	234.375
315	Paul Gavey (WAL)	234.375
316	Pat Horne (ENG)	234.375
317	Michael Kirkham (ENG)	228.125
318	George Wood (ENG)	225.000
319	Thomas McKenna (ENG)	225.000
320	Mike Dunn (ENG)	221.875
321	Patrick Mahon (IRL)	218.750
322	Norman Maher (WAL)	218.750
323	Paul Hefford (ENG)	215.625
324	Jerry Williams (ENG)	215.625
325	Kevin Lownds (ENG)	215.625
326	John Herbert (WAL)	212.500
327	Neil Selman (ENG)	209.375
328	David Lazenby (ENG)	209.375
329	Robert Harrhy (WAL)	209.375
330	Geet Sethi (IND)	203.125
331	Nicky Lazarus (ENG)	203.125
332	Ralph Mason (ENG)	203.125
333	Jonathan Bagley (ENG)	200.000
334	Peter McCullagh (ENG)	200.000
335	Norman MacLachlan (SCO)	200.000
336	Chris Carpenter (ENG)	200.000
337	Colin Kelly (ENG)	200.000
338	Paul McDonald (ENG)	196.875
339	Justin Buckingham (ENG)	196.875
340	Mike Smith (ENG)	193.750
341	Tony Emmott (ENG)	193.750
342	John Clouden (ENG)	190.625
343	Anthony Taylor (ENG)	187.500
344	Ann-Marie Farren (ENG)	187.500
345	Philip Minchin (ENG)	187.500
346	David Young (ENG)	187.500
347	Jamie Rous (ENG)	184.375
348	John Rees (ENG)	184.375
349	David Singh (IND)	184.375
350	Stuart Green (ENG)	184.375
351	Sukhbir Grewal (ENG)	181.250
352	Iwan Jones (WAL)	181.250
353	Allison Fisher (ENG)	178.125
354	Marc Devon (ENG)	178.125
355	Darren Lennox (IRL)	178.125
356	Gerry Jones (IRL)	175.000
357	Harry Morgan (NIR)	175.000
358	Micky Roughan (IRL)	171.875
359	Aidan Murphy (IRL)	168.750
360	Gary Thomas (SCO)	165.625
361	Nick Jones (WAL)	165.625
362	Karl Townsend (ENG)	165.625
363	Stan Haslam (ENG)	165.625
364	Shane Haines (ENG)	162.500
365	Gary Peters (WAL)	162.500
366	Martin Unsworth (ENG)	159.375
367	Philip Seaton (ENG)	159.375
368	Graham Stevens (ENG)	159.375
369	Jeff White (ENG)	159.375
370	Simon Westcott (ENG)	156.250
371	Stuart Mann (ENG)	156.250
372	David Athorn (ENG)	153.125
373	Steven Cook (ENG)	153.125
374	Mark Faulkner (ENG)	153.125
375	Karen Corr (NIR)	150.000
376	Steve Whalley (ENG)	150.000
377	Richard Pipe (ENG)	150.000
378	Hitesh Lakhani (ENG)	146.875
379	Mark Jervis (ENG)	146.875
380	John Lardner (SCO)	146.875
381	Ian Barry Stark (ENG)	146.875
382	Neil Martin (SCO)	146.875
383	Luke Spiller (ENG)	143.750
384	Stuart Pegrum (ENG)	143.750
385	Johangir Khan (ENG)	143.750
386	Tony Pierucci (ENG)	143.750
387	Gregg Tugby (ENG)	143.750
388	Chris Capel (ENG)	140.625
389	Andrew Prydden (ENG)	140.625
390	Simon Brooks (ENG)	140.625
391	Jimmy O'Shea (ENG)	137.500
392	John Harrop (ENG)	137.500
393	Fjolnir Thorgeirsson (ISL)	131.250
394	Richard McHugh (IRL)	131.250
395	Mike Henson (GER)	131.250
396	Steve Harrison (ENG)	131.250
397	Timothy Paling (ENG)	128.125
398	Jason Curtis (ENG)	128.125
399	Lyndon Smith (ENG)	128.125
400	Stephen Wylie (SCO)	128.125
401	Frank Fitzgerald (ENG)	125.000
402	John Dobson (WAL)	125.000
403	Kevin Brown (ENG)	125.000
404	Peter Peratikou (ENG)	121.875
405	Rory McLeod (ENG)	118.750
406	David Brabiner (JER)	115.625
407	Damon Zeid (ENG)	115.625
408	Peter Williams (WAL)	112.500
409	Robert Yule (ENG)	112.500
410	Claudio Ravagnani (ITA)	112.500
411	Derek Turner (ENG)	112.500
412	Tim Dunphy (IRL)	109.375
413	Robert Thallon (SCO)	106.250
414	Mark Darnes (ENG)	106.250
415	Richard King (ENG)	103.125
416	Chris Achilles (ENG)	100.000
417	Christopher Booth (ENG)	100.000
418	Peter Oakley (ENG)	100.000
419	Andrew Clark (ENG)	100.000
420	John Benton (IRL)	96.875
421	Paul Lovegrove (ENG)	96.875
422	Michael Valentine (SCO)	96.875
423	Sacha Journet (ENG)	96.875
424	Martin Grainger (ENG)	87.500
425	David Cheung (HKG)	87.500
426	Doug French (ENG)	87.500
427	Phil Mumford (ENG)	87.500
428	Atli Már Bjarnason (ISL)	87.500
429	David Wright (ENG)	84.375
430	Paul Hurren (ENG)	81.250
431	Mark Farrimond (ENG)	78.125
432	Nick Stanfield (ENG)	78.125
433	Michael Eaves (ENG)	78.125
434	Karl Krajnyak (ENG)	78.125
435	Jimmy Tarke-Singh (ENG)	75.000
436	Joe Baines (IRL)	75.000
437	David Hoggarth (ENG)	75.000
438	Roy Bigg (ENG)	71.875
439	Elliott Clark (ENG)	71.875
440	John Jorgensen (CAN)	71.875
441	Chris Archer (ENG)	71.875
442	Neil Cameron (ENG)	71.875
443	Andrew Alexandrou (ENG)	71.875
444	Peter Bardsley (ENG)	68.750
445	Mark Peevers (ENG)	68.750
446	David Hamson (ENG)	65.625
447	Tony Bolahood (CAN)	65.625
448	Ahmed Hussein Gamal (EGY)	65.625
449	John Cahill (CAN)	65.625
450	Barry Zee (SIN)	65.625
451	Andrew Photiou (ENG)	62.500
452	Alex Peart (JAM)	59.375
453	Michael Burke (ENG)	59.375
454	Trevor Holtby (ENG)	59.375
455	Graham Bradley (ENG)	56.250
456	Peter Delaney (ENG)	53.125
457	Chris Milner (ENG)	50.000
458	Alex Coutts (SCO)	50.000
459	Neville Atkins (ENG)	50.000
460	Neil Bowles (ENG)	50.000
461	Ronnie Shakespeare (ENG)	46.875
462	Clement Walden (ENG)	46.875
463	Navid Khan (ENG)	43.750
464	Paul Strafford (ENG)	43.750
465	Clive Bernstone (ENG)	40.625
466	Luke Roberts (ENG)	40.625
467	David Giles (ENG)	40.625
468	Colin Mitchell (ENG)	40.625
469	Geoff Grennan (ENG)	37.500
470	Kevin Johnstone (ENG)	37.500
471	Stephen Sanders (ENG)	34.375
472	Barry O'Loughlin (IRL)	34.375
473	Ayub Khalifa (ENG)	34.375
474	Foizur Rahman (ENG)	34.375
475	Russell Gough (ENG)	34.375
476	Richard Davis (ENG)	31.250
477	Ryan Michael (ENG)	31.250
478	John Fox (ENG)	28.125
479	Ian Gerrard (ENG)	28.125
480	Dave Andrew (ENG)	28.125
481	Andreas Ahmed (ENG)	25.000
482	Neil Shaw (ENG)	21.875
483	Russell Toombes (ENG)	21.875
484	Gareth Esprit (ENG)	21.875
485	John Mulready (IRL)	18.750
486	Anup Amin (ENG)	15.625
487	Lawrence Lillie (ENG)	15.625
488	Nicholas Segal (ENG)	12.500
489	Declan Healy (ENG)	12.500
490	Christopher Flight (ENG)	12.500
491	Stephen Phillips (ENG)	12.500
492	Don Watson (ENG)	9.375
493	Sean Seymour (ENG)	9.375
494	Del Smith (ENG)	6.250
495	Peter Cadogan (ENG)	3.125
496	Kostas Andreou (ENG)	–
497	Georgina Aplin (ENG)	–
498	Mike Badgley (CAN)	–
499	Ashley Beal (ENG)	–
500	David Boon (CAN)	–
501	Steve Bradley (ENG)	–
502	Pascal Burke (IRL)	–
503	Anthony Corina (ENG)	–
504	J Drake (Note: Nationality unknown)	–
505	Craig Duffy (AUS)	–
506	Richard Dunne	–
507	Clive Everton (WAL)	–
508	Geoff Foulds (ENG)	–
509	Mannie Francisco (RSA)	–
510	James Giannaros (AUS)	–
511	David Greaves (ENG)	–
512	Frank Gumbrell (ENG)	–
513	Richard Hamilton (ENG)	–
514	Andrew Hannah (ENG)	–
515	Adrian Hirst (ENG)	–
516	Michael Kailides (ENG)	–
517	Jyri Kari	–
518	Malcolm Kerr (SCO)	–
519	Peter Kippie (CAN)	–
520	Lun Wai Lee (ENG)	–
521	Donald Lelievre (CAN)	–
522	Scott MacFarlane (SCO)	–
523	Maureen McCarthy (NIR)	–
524	Joe McDonald (CAN)	–
525	Damien McKiernan (SCO)	–
526	Jim Meadowcroft (ENG)	–
527	Anthony Metcalfe (ENG)	–
528	Bernie Mikkelsen (CAN)	–
529	Steve Mizerak (USA)	–
530	Paul Morgan (ENG)	–
531	David Mucklow	–
532	Tony Mucklow (ENG)	–
533	Robert Noon (ENG)	–
534	Kyndon Paddon (ENG)	–
535	Maurice Parkin (ENG)	–
536	Brian Peddie (ENG)	–
537	Guilio Rea (SCO)	–
538	Jim Rempe (USA)	–
539	Paul Riley (ENG)	–
540	Ian Sargeant (WAL)	–
541	Michael Sobala (CAN)	–
542	Andrew Sullivan (ENG)	–
543	Stephen Taylor (ENG)	–
544	Bryngmar Valdimarsson (ISL)	–
545	Paul Vallance (ENG)	–
546	Glen Wilkinson (AUS)	–

Preceded by 1991–92	1992–93	Succeeded by 1993–94
