= 1990 Classic (snooker) =

Mercantile Credit Classic
Tournament information
- Dates: 2–13 January 1990
- Venue: Norbreck Castle Hotel
- City: Blackpool
- Country: England
- Organisation: WPBSA
- Format: Ranking event
- Total prize fund: £300,000
- Winner's share: £60,000
- Highest break: Steve James (ENG) (141)

Final
- Champion: Steve James (ENG)
- Runner-up: Warren King (AUS)
- Score: 10–6

The 1990 Mercantile Credit Classic was the eleventh edition of the professional snooker tournament which took place from 2–13 January 1990 with ITV coverage beginning on the 6th. The tournament was played at the Norbreck Castle Hotel, Blackpool, Lancashire.

The semi-finals have been reduced to one session each of best of 11 frames and the final with two session with a best of 19 final. Steve James won his only ranking title beating Warren King of Australia 10–6 in a tournament of upsets which only 4 of the top 16 reaching their seeding places.

== Main draw ==
First Round; Best of 9 frames
(England) Steve Duggan | 5
(Wales) Doug Mountjoy | 4
(South Africa) Peter Francisco | 5
(Scotland) Murdo MacLeod | 2
(England) Tony Meo | 5
(Northern Ireland) Tommy Murphy | 2
(Wales) Steve Newbury | 5
(Republic of Ireland) Paul Watchorn | 2
(England) John Virgo | 5
(England) Jon Wright | 2
(Northern Ireland) Jack McLaughlin | 5
(England) David Roe | 2
(Australia) Warren King | 5
(Wales) Terry Griffiths | 1
(Australia) Eddie Charlton | 5
(England) Bob Harris | 2
(England) Ian Brumby | w/o
(England) Jimmy White | w/d
(South Africa) Silvino Francisco | 5
(Wales) Colin Roscoe | 1
(England) Dean Reynolds | w/o
(Canada) Jim Wych | w/d
(England) Mark Rowing | 5
(England) Barry West | 0
(England) Nigel Gilbert | 5
(England) Joe Johnson | 0
(England) Martin Clark | 5
(England) Andrew Cairns | 2
(Scotland) Stephen Hendry | 5
(England) Tony Jones | 3
(New Zealand) Dene O'Kane | 5
(England) Danny Fowler | 4
(England) John Parrott | 5
(England) Craig Edwards | 2
(Northern Ireland) Alex Higgins | 5
(England) Mark Johnston-Allen | 0
(England) Steve James | 5
(England) Jim Chambers | 4
(Canada) Bob Chaperon | 5
(England) Brian Rowswell | 1
(Australia) John Campbell | 5
(England) Tony Knowles | 4
(England) Gary Wilkinson | 5
(Wales) Cliff Wilson | 2
(England) Mike Hallett | 5
(Republic of Ireland) Stephen Murphy | 1
(Wales) Wayne Jones | 5
(England) Ray Edmonds | 1
(Canada) Cliff Thorburn | 5
(England) Nick Terry | 2
(Wales) Darren Morgan | 5
(England) Neal Foulds | 4
(England) David Taylor | 5
(England) Willie Thorne | 1
(England) Brian Morgan | 5
(Republic of Ireland) Eugene Hughes | 1
(Northern Ireland) Dennis Taylor | 5
(Wales) Mark Bennett | 2
(Malta) Tony Drago | 5
(England) Nick Dyson | 3
(England) Steve Davis | 5
(Wales) Tony Chappel | 4
(England) Rex Williams | 5
(Scotland) Eddie Sinclair | 1

Second Round; Best of 9 frames
(England) Steve Duggan | 2
(South Africa) Peter Francisco | 5
(England) Tony Meo | 4
(Wales) Steve Newbury | 5
(England) John Virgo | 5
(Northern Ireland) Jack McLaughlin | 2
(Australia) Warren King | 5
(Australia) Eddie Charlton | 2
(England) Ian Brumby | 0
(South Africa) Silvino Francisco | 5
(England) Dean Reynolds | 4
(England) Mark Rowing | 5
(England) Nigel Gilbert | 4
(England) Martin Clark | 5
(Scotland) Stephen Hendry | 2
(New Zealand) Dene O'Kane | 5
(England) John Parrott | 5
(Northern Ireland) Alex Higgins | 4
(England) Steve James | 5
(Canada) Bob Chaperon | 2
(Australia) John Campbell | 4
(England) Gary Wilkinson | 5
(England) Mike Hallett | 3
(Wales) Wayne Jones | 5
(Canada) Cliff Thorburn | 4
(Wales) Darren Morgan | 5
(England) David Taylor | 4
(England) Brian Morgan | 5
(Northern Ireland) Dennis Taylor | 4
(Malta) Tony Drago | 5
(England) Steve Davis | 5
(England) Rex Williams | 0

Third Round; Best of 9 frames
(South Africa) Peter Francisco | 3
(Wales) Steve Newbury | 5
(England) John Virgo | 1
(Australia) Warren King | 5
(South Africa) Silvino Francisco | 5
(England) Mark Rowing | 1
(England) Martin Clark | 1
(New Zealand) Dene O'Kane | 5
(England) John Parrott | 3
(England) Steve James | 5
(England) Gary Wilkinson | 2
(Wales) Wayne Jones | 5
(Wales) Darren Morgan | 1
(England) Brian Morgan | 5
(Malta) Tony Drago | 3
(England) Steve Davis | 5

Quarter-finals; Best of 9 frames
(Wales) Steve Newbury | 3
(Australia) Warren King | 5
(South Africa) Silvino Francisco | 5
(New Zealand) Dene O'Kane | 4
(England) Steve James | 5
(Wales) Wayne Jones | 2
(England) Brian Morgan | 1
(England) Steve Davis | 5

Semi-finals; Best of 11 frames
(Australia) Warren King | 6
(South Africa) Silvino Francisco | 5
(England) Steve James | 6
(England) Steve Davis | 4

Final; Best of 19 frames
(Australia) Warren King | 6
(England) Steve James | 10

== Final ==
Final: Best of 19 frames. Referee: . Norbreck Castle Hotel, Blackpool, England, 13 January 1990.
| Steve James; England | 10–6 | Warren King; Australia |
First session: 74–47, 33–85, 72–16, 76–8 (59), 72–33, 53–63, 67–61 (50), 46–71; Second session: 26–61, 77–1, 101–12 (101), 35–71, 0–70 (68), 70–58 (70), 64–31, 75–13 (54)
| 101 | Highest break | 68 |
| 1 | Century breaks | 0 |
| 4 | 50+ breaks | 2 |

== Century breaks ==
(Including qualifying rounds)

- 141, 104, 101 – Steve James
- 126, 109 – Tony Drago
- 121 – Tommy Murphy
- 119 – Dennis Taylor
- 117 – Brian Morgan
- 116 – John Virgo
- 113 – Peter Francisco
- 111 – Martin Clark
- 106 – Steve Newbury
- 105 – Wayne Jones
- 102 – Cliff Thorburn
- 102 – Jim Wych
- 100 – Dene O'Kane
