= Franky Chan =

Hong Kong snooker player

Personal information
- Born: 17 March 1965 (age 61)

Sport
- Country: Hong Kong
- Sport: Snooker
- Professional: 1990–1996
- Highest ranking: 42 (1992/1993)
- Best ranking finish: Quarter-final (1992 Strachan Open)

Franky Chan
- Traditional Chinese: 陳偉明
- Simplified Chinese: 陈伟明
Transcriptions
Standard Mandarin
- Hanyu Pinyin: Chén Wěimíng
Yue: Cantonese
- Jyutping: Can^{4} Wai^{5} Ming^{4}
- IPA: [tsʰɐn˩ wɐj˩˧.mɪŋ˩]

Franky Chan (Chinese: 陳偉明; born 17 March 1965) is a former professional snooker player from Hong Kong.

== Career ==
Chan started playing snooker when he was 12 and became a professional player in 1990. He played in the Hong Kong Masters and the 1988 Kent Cup, and was a semi-finalist at the 1989 World Amateur Snooker Championship where he was defeated 2-8 by Ken Doherty.

Chen defeated amateurs Guy Dennis and Marcus Campbell and then professional Mike Darrington in the 1990 Professional Play-offs to secure a place as a professional for the 1990–91 snooker season. He became the first professional player from Hong Kong.

Chan's first season on tour saw runs to the last 16 at two ranking events, the Asian Open and the Dubai Classic, and to the last-32 stage at the 1991 British Open. In the 1990 Asian Open, he defeated Jason Smith, David Roe, Wayne Jones and Darren Morgan, before losing 1–5 to Tony Chappel; the Dubai Classic saw victories over Joe Grech, Nigel Gilbert, Cliff Wilson and Jimmy White, but then was beaten 2–5 by Rex Williams. In the British Open, Chan was defeated 5–0 by Stephen Hendry; having started the season without a ranking, he finished it 53rd, already within the top 64 who automatically kept their place on tour for the following season.

In the non-ranking 1991 Belgian Challenge, Chan reached the quarter-finals, where he faced White again, and this time lost 0–5; however, only sixteen players featured in the event and Chan had won his last-16 match against Neal Foulds to reach this stage. Later in the 1991–92 season, he recorded the best finish of his career when he faced Nigel Bond in the quarter-finals of the ranking 1992 Strachan Open, although he lost 1–5. Chan finished the season ranked 42nd, also a career-best.

By the end of the 1993–94 snooker season, Chan had slipped to 118th in the rankings. He did not play professionally again after that season and was ranked 310th in 1995.

== Performance and rankings timeline ==
Tournament	1986/ 87	1987/ 88	1988/ 89	1990/ 91	1991/ 92	1992/ 93	1993/ 94	1994/ 95	1995/ 96
Ranking (Note: It shows the ranking at the beginning of the season)	(Note: He was an amateur)			(Note: New players don't have a ranking)	53	42	79	118	310
Ranking tournaments
Thailand Classic (Note: The event was called the Dubai Masters (1988/1989) and the Dubai Classic (1990/1991–1994/1995))	Not Held		NR	3R	LQ	LQ	LQ	A	A
Grand Prix	A	A	A	LQ	1R	LQ	LQ	A	A
UK Championship	A	A	A	1R	LQ	1R	LQ	A	A
Welsh Open	Tournament Not Held				1R	LQ	LQ	A	A
International Open	A	A	A	Not Held		LQ	LQ	A	A
European Open	Not Held		A	LQ	LQ	LQ	LQ	A	A
Thailand Open (Note: The event was called the Thailand Masters (1986/1987 and 1991/1992) and the Asian Open (1990/1991–1992/1993))	NR	Not Held		3R	LQ	LQ	WD	A	A
British Open	A	A	A	2R	LQ	1R	LQ	A	A
World Championship	A	A	A	LQ	LQ	LQ	A	A	A
Non-ranking tournaments
The Masters	A	A	A	LQ	LQ	A	A	A	A
Former ranking tournaments
Classic	A	A	A	LQ	LQ	Tournament Not Held			
Strachan Open (Note: The event was called the Strachan Challenge (1992/1993-1993/1994))	Tournament Not Held				QF	MR	NR	Not Held	
Former non-ranking tournaments
World Masters	Not Held			LQ	Tournament Not Held				
Hong Kong Challenge (Note: The event was called the Hong Kong Masters (1986/1987-1988/1989) and the World Series Challenge (1990/1991))	1R	1R	1R	1R	A	Tournament Not Held			
Belgian Challenge	Tournament Not Held				QF	Tournament Not Held			
Kent Classic (Note: The event was called the Kent Cup (1986/1987–1988/1989 and 1990/1991))	A	1R	A	A	NH	A	Not Held		

Performance Table Legend
LQ	lost in the qualifying draw	#R	lost in the early rounds of the tournament (WR = Wildcard round, RR = Round robin)	QF	lost in the quarter-finals
SF	lost in the semi-finals	F	lost in the final	W	won the tournament
DNQ	did not qualify for the tournament	A	did not participate in the tournament	WD	withdrew from the tournament
DQ	disqualified from the tournament				

NH / Not Held	event was not held
NR / Non-Ranking Event	event is/was no longer a ranking event
R / Ranking Event	event is/was a ranking event
MR / Minor-Ranking Event	means an event is/was a minor-ranking event
PA / Pro-am Event	means an event is/was a pro-am event
