= Mike Henson (snooker player) =

Scottish snooker player (born 1959)

Personal information
- Born: 8 October 1959 (age 67)

Sport
- Country: Germany
- Sport: Snooker
- Professional: 1990–1994, 1998/99
- Best ranking finish: Last 32 (x1)

Michael "Mike" Henson (born 8 October 1959) is a British-German former professional snooker player and multiple German Snooker Champion. He competed on the professional tour from 1990 to 1994 and in the 1998/99 season.

== Career ==
Henson was born in Scotland and moved to Germany in the mid-1980s. He initially worked as a billiard coach in Gifhorn. Despite early unsuccessful attempts to qualify for the professional circuit, he later joined the pro ranks when the tour opened its doors in 1991.

Henson's amateur career highlights include seven German championship titles, both in singles and doubles. He also participated in multiple Amateur World Championships and performed notably in international tournaments such as the Dutch Open.

== Performance and rankings timeline ==
| Tournament | 1990/ 91 | 1991/ 92 | 1992/ 93 | 1993/ 94 | 1998/ 99 |
|---|---|---|---|---|---|
| Ranking (Note: It shows the ranking at the beginning of the season) | (Note: He was an amateur) | (Note: New players on the Main Tour do not have a ranking) | 395 | 515 | |
Ranking tournaments
| Grand Prix | A | LQ | WD | A | LQ |
| UK Championship | A | LQ | WD | A | LQ |
| Irish Open (Note: The event was called the European Open (1990/1991-1993/1994)) | A | LQ | WD | A | LQ |
| Welsh Open | NH | LQ | WD | A | LQ |
| Scottish Open (Note: The event was also called the International Open (1992/1993-1993/1994)) | Not Held | | WD | A | LQ |
| Thailand Masters (Note: The event was called the Asian Open (1990/1991-1992/1993) and the Thailand Open (1993/1994)) | A | LQ | WD | A | LQ |
| China International | Tournament Not Held | | | | LQ |
| British Open | A | LQ | WD | A | LQ |
| World Championship | A | LQ | WD | A | LQ |
Non-ranking tournaments
| The Masters | A | LQ | A | A | A |
Former ranking tournaments
| Classic | A | LQ | Not Held | | |
| Strachan Open (Note: The event was called the Strachan Challenge (1992/1993-1993/1994)) | NH | LQ | MR | NR | NH |
| Dubai Classic | A | LQ | WD | A | NH |
Former non-ranking tournaments
| World Masters | 2R | Tournament Not Held | | | |
| Belgian Challenge | NH | 1R | Not Held | | |

Performance Table Legend
| LQ | lost in the qualifying draw | #R | lost in the early rounds of the tournament (WR = Wildcard round, RR = Round robin) | QF | lost in the quarter-finals |
| SF | lost in the semi-finals | F | lost in the final | W | won the tournament |
| DNQ | did not qualify for the tournament | A | did not participate in the tournament | WD | withdrew from the tournament |

| NH / Not Held | means an event was not held. |
| NR / Non-Ranking Event | means an event is/was no longer a ranking event. |
| R / Ranking Event | means an event is/was a ranking event. |
| MR / Minor-Ranking Event | means an event is/was a minor-ranking event. |
| PA / Pro-am Event | means an event is/was a pro-am event. |

== Achievements ==
- 7× German Champion (Singles, Doubles, Open)
- Last 16 – Belgian Challenge
- Multiple Amateur World Championship appearances
