= 1990 Asian Open =

Asian Open
Tournament information
- Dates: 29 October – 3 November 1990
- Venue: GDTV
- City: Guangzhou
- Country: China
- Organisation: WPBSA
- Format: Ranking event
- Total prize fund: £200,000
- Winner's share: £35,000
- Highest break: Stephen Hendry (SCO) (110)

Final
- Champion: Stephen Hendry (SCO)
- Runner-up: Dennis Taylor (NIR)
- Score: 9–3

The 1990 555 Asian Open was a professional ranking snooker tournament that took place between 29 October and 3 November 1990 at the Guangdong TV studios in Guangzhou, China.

Defending champion Stephen Hendry won the tournament by defeating Dennis Taylor 9–3 in the final.

== Main draw ==
Last 64; Best of 9 frames
(Scotland) Stephen Hendry	5
(Scotland) Duncan Campbell	2
(Republic of Ireland) Joe O'Boye	5
(Canada) Alain Robidoux	4
(England) Willie Thorne	5
(England) Steve Longworth	2
(Thailand) James Wattana	5
(England) Joe Johnson	2
(Wales) Mark Bennett	5
(England) Tony Meo	3
(Canada) Bob Chaperon	5
(Canada) Jim Wych	2
(Australia) John Campbell	5
(Wales) Terry Griffiths	4
(Scotland) Murdo MacLeod	5
(Wales) Steve Newbury	4
(England) Mike Hallett	5
(England) Steve Duggan	1
(England) Steve Campbell	5
(England) Gary Wilkinson	3
(South Africa) Silvino Francisco	5
(England) David Taylor	3
(England) Bob Harris	5
(England) Steve James	3
(England) Les Dodd	5
(England) Tony Knowles	1
(England) John Virgo	5
(England) Bob Marshall	2
(Australia) Eddie Charlton	5
(Wales) Colin Roscoe	0
(England) Jimmy White	5
(Australia) Warren King	3
(Northern Ireland) Dennis Taylor	5
(Malta) Joe Grech	2
(Wales) Cliff Wilson	5
(England) Andrew Cairns	2
(England) Nigel Bond	5
(England) Steve Davis	3
(Malta) Tony Drago	5
(England) Graham Cripsey	0
(England) Neal Foulds	5
(England) Jonathan Birch	4
(New Zealand) Dene O'Kane	5
(England) Brian Rowswell	3
(Wales) Doug Mountjoy	5
(England) Nigel Gilbert	0
(Canada) Brady Gollan	5
(England) Barry West	3
(Wales) Tony Chappel	5
(Canada) Cliff Thorburn	2
(England) Dean Reynolds	5
(England) Roger Bales	0
(Hong Kong) Franky Chan	5
(Wales) Wayne Jones	3
(Wales) Darren Morgan	w/o
(Northern Ireland) Alex Higgins	w/d
(England) John Parrott	5
(England) Mick Price	1
(South Africa) Peter Francisco	5
(Republic of Ireland) Eugene Hughes	4
(Northern Ireland) Jack McLaughlin	5
(England) Danny Fowler	3
(England) Martin Clark	5
(England) Rex Williams	4

Last 32; Best of 9 frames
(Scotland) Stephen Hendry	5
(Republic of Ireland) Joe O'Boye	3
(England) Willie Thorne	5
(Thailand) James Wattana	2
(Wales) Mark Bennett	5
(Canada) Bob Chaperon	4
(Australia) John Campbell	5
(Scotland) Murdo MacLeod	4
(England) Mike Hallett	5
(England) Steve Campbell	1
(South Africa) Silvino Francisco	5
(England) Bob Harris	3
(England) Les Dodd	5
(England) John Virgo	1
(Australia) Eddie Charlton	5
(England) Jimmy White	4
(Northern Ireland) Dennis Taylor	5
(Wales) Cliff Wilson	4
(England) Nigel Bond	5
(Malta) Tony Drago	1
(England) Neal Foulds	5
(New Zealand) Dene O'Kane	4
(Wales) Doug Mountjoy	5
(Canada) Brady Gollan	4
(Wales) Tony Chappel	5
(England) Dean Reynolds	2
(Hong Kong) Franky Chan	5
(Wales) Darren Morgan	2
(England) John Parrott	5
(South Africa) Peter Francisco	0
(Northern Ireland) Jack McLaughlin	5
(England) Martin Clark	2

Last 16; Best of 9 frames
(Scotland) Stephen Hendry	5
(England) Willie Thorne	4
(Wales) Mark Bennett	5
(Australia) John Campbell	4
(England) Mike Hallett	w/o
(South Africa) Silvino Francisco	w/d
(England) Les Dodd	5
(Australia) Eddie Charlton	2
(Northern Ireland) Dennis Taylor	5
(England) Nigel Bond	1
(England) Neal Foulds	5
(Wales) Doug Mountjoy	3
(Wales) Tony Chappel	5
(Hong Kong) Franky Chan	1
(England) John Parrott	5
(Northern Ireland) Jack McLaughlin	2

Quarter-finals; Best of 9 frames
(Scotland) Stephen Hendry	5
(Wales) Mark Bennett	3
(England) Mike Hallett	5
(England) Les Dodd	4
(Northern Ireland) Dennis Taylor	5
(England) Neal Foulds	4
(Wales) Tony Chappel	5
(England) John Parrott	3

Semi-finals; Best of 9 frames
(Scotland) Stephen Hendry	5
(England) Mike Hallett	1
(Northern Ireland) Dennis Taylor	5
(Wales) Tony Chappel	4

Final; Best of 17 frames
(Scotland) Stephen Hendry	9
(Northern Ireland) Dennis Taylor	3
