= Dene O'Kane =

New Zealand snooker player (1963–2024)

Personal information
- Born: 24 February 1963 Christchurch, New Zealand
- Died: 14 May 2024 (aged 61) Waiheke Island, New Zealand

Sport
- Country: New Zealand
- Sport: Snooker
- Professional: 1984–2001, 2006–2007
- Highest ranking: 18
- Best ranking finish: Runner-up (x1)

Dene O'Kane (24 February 1963 – 14 May 2024) was a New Zealand professional snooker player.

== Career ==
O'Kane won the 1980 New Zealand Amateur Championship, and represented New Zealand at the 1982 IBSF World Snooker Championship, winning six of his nine group matches, but failing to qualify on frame difference. He turned professional in 1984.

In his first professional tournament, the 1984 International Open, he won four qualifying matches (5–2 against Maurice Parkin, 5–1 against Eddie McLaughlin, 5–4 against Jack Fitzmaurice and 5–4 against Mike Hallett) before losing 3–5 to Willie Thorne. Also in his debut season, he reached the quarter-finals of the 1985 British Open, and progressing through the qualifying rounds with four wins and a walkover, reached the last 32 of the 1985 World Snooker Championship, in which he lost 4–10 to David Taylor.

O'Kane reached the quarter-finals of the World Championship in 1987 and 1992. He reached the final stages (last 32 or better) of the World Championship six times, but never in consecutive years. He was the runner-up in the 1989 Hong Kong Open, losing 8–9 to Mike Hallett after leading 8–6.

O'Kane first reached the top 32 in the world rankings for the 1985/1986 season, returning three years later. In 1991/1992 he reached his career high position of 18. He remained in the top 32 until 1996/1997.

Having won £415,000 in prize money during his career, O'Kane started a career in real estate in 2007.

== Death ==
O'Kane died after suffering a brain bleed caused by a fall at his place of residence on 14 May 2024, aged 61.

== Performance and rankings timeline ==
Tournament	1984/ 85	1985/ 86	1986/ 87	1987/ 88	1988/ 89	1989/ 90	1990/ 91	1991/ 92	1992/ 93	1993/ 94	1994/ 95	1995/ 96	1996/ 97	1997/ 98	1998/ 99	1999/ 00	2000/ 01	2006/ 07	2008/ 09
Ranking (Note: From the 2010/2011 season it shows the ranking at the beginning of the season.)	(Note: New players on the Main Tour do not have a ranking.)	32	39	35	23	28	23	18	18	22	20	18	27	35	57	77	96	(Note: New players on the Main Tour do not have a ranking.)	(Note: He was an amateur.)
Ranking tournaments
Grand Prix	1R	1R	LQ	LQ	2R	1R	3R	3R	1R	3R	1R	3R	1R	LQ	2R	LQ	LQ	A	A
UK Championship	LQ	1R	2R	3R	2R	2R	1R	2R	3R	2R	2R	2R	1R	2R	1R	LQ	WD	LQ	A
Malta Cup (Note: The event ran under different names such as the European Open (1988/1989 to 1996/1997) and Irish Open (1998/1999))	Tournament Not Held				1R	2R	QF	1R	1R	1R	LQ	LQ	LQ	NR	LQ	Not Held		LQ	NH
Welsh Open	Tournament Not Held							2R	2R	1R	1R	1R	3R	LQ	LQ	LQ	LQ	LQ	A
China Open (Note: The event also ran as the China International (1997/1998–1998/1999))	Tournament Not Held													NR	LQ	LQ	LQ	LQ	A
World Championship	1R	LQ	QF	LQ	1R	LQ	LQ	QF	LQ	1R	LQ	1R	LQ	LQ	LQ	LQ	LQ	LQ	A
Non-ranking tournaments
Six-red Snooker International	Tournament Not Held																		2R
The Masters	A	A	A	A	A	A	A	LQ	A	A	A	LQ	A	LQ	A	A	A	LQ	A
Former ranking tournaments
Canadian Masters	NH	Non-Ranking			LQ	Tournament Not Held													
Hong Kong Open (Note: The event also ran as the Australian Masters (1983/1984–1987/1988 & 1995/1996))	Non-Ranking Event				NH	F	Not Held				NR		Tournament Not Held						
Classic	LQ	2R	LQ	LQ	2R	QF	3R	1R	Tournament Not Held										
Strachan Open	Tournament Not Held							3R	Tournament Not Held										
Dubai Classic (Note: The event ran under different names such as Thailand Classic (1995/1996) and Asian Classic (1996/1997))	Tournament Not Held				NR	2R	2R	2R	1R	1R	1R	SF	LQ	Tournament Not Held					
German Open	Tournament Not Held											LQ	LQ	WD	NR	Not Held			
Malta Grand Prix	Tournament Not Held										Non-Ranking Event					LQ	NR	Not Held	
Thailand Masters (Note: The event ran under different names such as Asian Open (1989/1990 to 1992/1993) and Thailand Open (1993/1994 to 1996/1997))	Non-Ranking Event			Not Held		2R	2R	QF	2R	1R	LQ	LQ	LQ	LQ	LQ	LQ	LQ	NR	NH
Scottish Open (Note: The event ran under different names such as International Open (1984/1985, 1986/1987 to 1996/1997) and Matchroom Trophy (1985/1986))	2R	2R	2R	1R	2R	1R	Not Held		2R	2R	1R	1R	3R	1R	LQ	LQ	LQ	Not Held	
British Open	QF	1R	LQ	QF	2R	1R	1R	1R	2R	2R	3R	2R	1R	1R	LQ	LQ	LQ	Not Held	
Former non-ranking tournaments
New Zealand Masters	A	Not Held			QF	QF	Tournament Not Held												
Shoot-Out	Tournament Not Held						2R	Tournament Not Held											
Hong Kong Open (Note: The event also ran as the Australian Masters (1983/1984–1987/1988 & 1995/1996))	A	A	A	1R	NH	R	Not Held				SF	A	Tournament Not Held						

Performance Table Legend
LQ	lost in the qualifying draw	#R	lost in the early rounds of the tournament (WR = Wildcard round, RR = Round robin)	QF	lost in the quarter-finals
SF	lost in the semi-finals	F	lost in the final	W	won the tournament
DNQ	did not qualify for the tournament	A	did not participate in the tournament	WD	withdrew from the tournament

NH / Not Held	means an event was not held.
NR / Non-Ranking Event	means an event is/was no longer a ranking event.
R / Ranking Event	means an event is/was a ranking event.
RV / Ranking & Variant Format Event	means an event is/was a ranking & variant format event.
MR / Minor-Ranking Event	means an event is/was a minor-ranking event.
PA / Pro-am Event	means an event is/was a pro-am event.
VF / Variant Format Event	means an event is/was a variant format event.

== Career finals ==
=== Ranking finals: 1 ===
Outcome	No.	Year	Championship	Opponent in the final	Score
Runner-up	1.	1989	Hong Kong Open	(England) Mike Hallett	8–9

=== Team finals: 1 ===
Outcome	No.	Year	Championship	Team/partner	Opponent in the final	Score
Runner-up	1.	1989	World Cup	Rest of the World	England	8–9

=== Amateur finals: 12 (8 titles) ===
Outcome	No.	Year	Championship	Opponent in the final	Score
Winner	1.	1980	New Zealand Amateur Championship	(New Zealand) Peter Mischefski	4–1
Runner-up	1.	1981	Junior Pot Black	(England) Dean Reynolds	79–151 (Note: Final decided on aggregate score over two frames)
Winner	2.	2004	World Amateur Championship – Masters	(Republic of Ireland) Eugene Hughes	5–2
Winner	3.	2005	Australian Open Championship	(Australia) Glen Wilkinson	8–7
Winner	4.	2005	World Amateur Championship – Masters (2)	(Republic of Ireland) Joe Delaney	5–4
Winner	5.	2006	Oceania Championship	(Australia) Aaron Mahoney	6–5
Runner-up	2.	2006	Australian Open Championship	(Australia) Steve Mifsud	7–8
Winner	6.	2007	Oceania Championship (2)	(New Zealand) Daniel Haenga	6–5
Winner	7.	2008	Australian Open Championship (2)	(Australia) Stuart Lawler	6–2
Winner	8.	2008	World Amateur Championship – Masters (3)	(India) Geet Sethi	5–1
Runner-up	3.	2009	World Amateur Championship – Masters	(Wales) Darren Morgan	0–6
Runner-up	4.	2020	Oceania 6-red Championship	(Australia) Kurt Dunham	3–5
