= 1990 UK Championship =

1990 StormSeal UK Championship
Tournament information
- Dates: 16 November – 2 December 1990
- Venue: Preston Guild Hall
- City: Preston
- Country: England
- Organisation: WPBSA
- Format: Ranking event
- Total prize fund: £445,000
- Winner's share: £110,000
- Highest break: John Parrott (ENG) (140)

Final
- Champion: Stephen Hendry (SCO)
- Runner-up: Steve Davis (ENG)
- Score: 16–15

The 1990 UK Championship (officially the 1990 StormSeal UK Championship) was a professional ranking snooker tournament that took place between 16 November and 2 December 1990 at the Guild Hall in Preston, England. This was the second and last UK Championship to be sponsored by StormSeal. The televised stages were shown on the BBC from 24 November to the final.

Hendry beat 19-year-old fellow Scot Alan McManus in the semi-final by a 9–5 scoreline. McManus, who was in his rookie season, had just beaten Dennis Taylor, Steve Newbury, Silvino Francisco and Jimmy White to make the semis. Nigel Bond, who was a finalist at the Grand Prix a month earlier, made it to the quarter-finals losing to Davis.

Defending champion Stephen Hendry defeated Steve Davis 16–15 in the final. The highest break of the tournament was 140 made by John Parrott.

== Prize fund ==
The breakdown of prize money for this year is shown below:

- Winner: £110,000
- Runner-up: £n/a
- Semi-finals: £30,000
- Total: £445,000

== Main draw ==
Last 64; Best of 17 frames
(Scotland) Stephen Hendry	9
(Isle of Man) Tony Wilson	2
(Wales) Tony Chappel	9
(New Zealand) Dene O'Kane	4
(England) Neal Foulds	9
(Hong Kong) Franky Chan	0
(Wales) Cliff Wilson	9
(England) Rod Lawler	3
(England) David Roe	9
(England) Tony Meo	6
(England) Danny Fowler	9
(England) Bob Harris	7
(Wales) Doug Mountjoy	9
(England) Ken Owers	0
(England) Gary Wilkinson	9
(Australia) John Campbell	8
(Wales) Terry Griffiths	9
(Malta) Joe Grech	2
(South Africa) Silvino Francisco	9
(England) Mick Price	7
(Scotland) Alan McManus	9
(Northern Ireland) Dennis Taylor	6
(Wales) Steve Newbury	9
(England) Barry Pinches	2
(Thailand) James Wattana	9
(England) John Virgo	2
(Wales) Darren Morgan	w/o
(Canada) Cliff Thorburn	w/d
(England) Jimmy White	9
(England) Les Dodd	0
(South Africa) Peter Francisco	9
(Scotland) Duncan Campbell	8
(England) John Parrott	9
(England) Mark Rowing	2
(England) Tony Jones	9
(Australia) Eddie Charlton	4
(Canada) Gary Natale	9
(England) Martin Clark	7
(England) Joe Johnson	9
(Australia) Warren King	8
(England) Steve James	9
(England) Nigel Gilbert	8
(England) Tony Knowles	9
(England) Rex Williams	4
(England) Mike Hallett	9
(England) Ian Graham	6
(Wales) Wayne Jones	9
(England) Steve Campbell	1
(England) Jonathan Birch	9
(England) Dean Reynolds	7
(Malta) Tony Drago	9
(Northern Ireland) Joe O'Boye	0
(England) Nigel Bond	w/o
(Northern Ireland) Alex Higgins	w/d
(Canada) Alain Robidoux	w/o
(England) Bill Oliver	w/d
(England) Willie Thorne	9
(England) Nick Dyson	8
(Wales) Colin Roscoe	9
(Canada) Bob Chaperon	6
(England) Steve Davis	9
(England) David Taylor	1
(England) Barry West	9
(England) Ray Edmonds	5

Last 32; Best of 17 frames
(Scotland) Stephen Hendry	9
(Wales) Tony Chappel	3
(England) Neal Foulds	9
(Wales) Cliff Wilson	4
(England) David Roe	5
(England) Danny Fowler	9
(Wales) Doug Mountjoy	6
(England) Gary Wilkinson	9
(Wales) Terry Griffiths	5
(South Africa) Silvino Francisco	9
(Scotland) Alan McManus	9
(Wales) Steve Newbury	3
(Thailand) James Wattana	9
(Wales) Darren Morgan	2
(England) Jimmy White	9
(South Africa) Peter Francisco	0
(England) John Parrott	9
(England) Tony Jones	3
(Canada) Gary Natale	5
(England) Joe Johnson	9
(England) Steve James	7
(England) Tony Knowles	9
(England) Mike Hallett	7
(Wales) Wayne Jones	9
(England) Jonathan Birch	9
(Malta) Tony Drago	6
(England) Nigel Bond	9
(Canada) Alain Robidoux	5
(England) Willie Thorne	9
(Wales) Colin Roscoe	1
(England) Steve Davis	9
(England) Barry West	5

Last 16; Best of 17 frames
(Scotland) Stephen Hendry	9
(England) Neal Foulds	2
(England) Danny Fowler	9
(England) Gary Wilkinson	8
(South Africa) Silvino Francisco	4
(Scotland) Alan McManus	9
(Thailand) James Wattana	7
(England) Jimmy White	9
(England) John Parrott	9
(England) Joe Johnson	8
(England) Tony Knowles	9
(Wales) Wayne Jones	8
(England) Jonathan Birch	6
(England) Nigel Bond	9
(England) Willie Thorne	5
(England) Steve Davis	9

Quarter-finals; Best of 17 frames
(Scotland) Stephen Hendry	9
(England) Danny Fowler	3
(Scotland) Alan McManus	9
(England) Jimmy White	6
(England) John Parrott	9
(England) Tony Knowles	7
(England) Nigel Bond	7
(England) Steve Davis	9

Semi-finals; Best of 17 frames
(Scotland) Stephen Hendry	9
(Scotland) Alan McManus	5
(England) John Parrott	6
(England) Steve Davis	9

Final; Best of 31 frames
(Scotland) Stephen Hendry	16
(England) Steve Davis	15

== Final ==
Final: Best of 31 frames. Referee: John Williams; The Guild Hall, Preston, England, 1 and 2 December 1990.
Stephen Hendry; Scotland	16–15	Steve Davis; England
First session: 116–15 (63), 72–59 (Hendry 71, Davis 59), 117–17 (78), 76–7 (55), 91–0 (91), 7–89 (77), 72–27; Second session: 40–64, 88–24, 33–60, 68–74 (Hendry 63), 23–68 (56), 29–95 (59), 70–57 (Davis 50); Third session: 122–0 (122), 46–82 (62), 91–21 (64), 76–20, 41–89 (89), 0–73 (73), 87–0 (87); Fourth session: 30–102 (102), 13–117, 66–12, 24–71 (55), 25–58, 60–15, 1–90 (90), 0–97 (51), 57–49 (57), 98–0 (98)
122	Highest break	102
1	Century breaks	1
11	50+ breaks	12

== Century breaks ==
- 140, 119, 102 – John Parrott
- 138 – James Wattana
- 130, 122, 109, 108, 106, 101, 100 – Stephen Hendry
- 130 – Tony Knowles
- 130 – Willie Thorne
- 126, – Gary Wilkinson
- 124, 107 – Nigel Bond
- 123, 104, 102 – Steve Davis
- 122 – Alain Robidoux
- 120 – Steve James
- 115, 109, 105 – Jonathan Birch
- 110, 101 – Alan McManus
- 110 – Mick Price
- 109 – Mark Rowing
- 108 – Gary Natale
- 105 – Joe Grech
- 102 – Martin Clark
- 101 – Doug Mountjoy
- 100 – Danny Fowler
