= 1992 Strachan Open =

Strachan Open
Tournament information
- Dates: 2–7 March 1992
- Venue: Thornbury Leisure Centre
- City: Bristol
- Country: England
- Organisation: WPBSA
- Format: Ranking event
- Winner's share: £12,500

Final
- Champion: James Wattana (THA)
- Runner-up: John Parrott (ENG)
- Score: 9–5

The 1992 Strachan Open was a professional ranking snooker tournament, that was held from 2–7 March 1992 at the Thorbury Leisure Centre, Bristol, England. This tournament was a one-off ranking event sponsored by the well known billiard table cloth company. It carried a slightly lower points tariff and a considerably lower prize fund than the main ranking events and as such was boycotted by several of the top players.

James Wattana won the tournament by defeating John Parrott nine frames to five in the final. Peter Ebdon made a maximum break in qualifying against Wayne Martin.

== Main draw ==
Last 64; Best of 9 frames
(Thailand) James Wattana	5
(Isle of Man) Tony Wilson	3
(Wales) Terry Griffiths	5
(Canada) Kirk Stevens	1
(England) Danny Fowler	5
(Wales) Tony Chappel	4
(Canada) Alain Robidoux	5
(Scotland) Drew Henry	1
(Canada) Cliff Thorburn	5
(England) Neal Foulds	2
(England) Andy Hicks	5
(Canada) Bob Chaperon	4
(England) Dean Reynolds	5
(Northern Ireland) Jack McLaughlin	4
(Wales) Cliff Wilson	5
(Malta) Joe Grech	2
(England) Nigel Bond	5
(England) Peter Ebdon	2
(Northern Ireland) Dennis Taylor	5
(England) Colin Morton	2
(England) Jonathan Birch	5
(England) Willie Thorne	3
(Australia) Eddie Charlton	5
(England) Jamie Woodman	3
(Hong Kong) Franky Chan	5
(South Africa) Silvino Francisco	3
(Scotland) Billy Snaddon	5
(South Africa) Peter Francisco	4
(England) Tony Meo	5
(England) Brian Rowswell	0
(England) Gary Wilkinson	5
(Republic of Ireland) Stephen Murphy	4
(England) John Parrott	5
(England) Nigel Gilbert	1
(England) Peter Lines	5
(Wales) Steve Newbury	1
(England) Martin Clark	5
(Scotland) Duncan Campbell	1
(Northern Ireland) Joe Swail	5
(Wales) Mark Bennett	1
(England) David Roe	5
(England) Mike Hallett	2
(Malta) Tony Drago	5
(Scotland) Alan McManus	2
(Wales) Darren Morgan	5
(Scotland) Murdo MacLeod	2
(England) Brian Morgan	5
(England) Tony Jones	3
(Republic of Ireland) Ken Doherty	5
(England) John Virgo	1
(Wales) Colin Roscoe	5
(England) Tony Knowles	4
(Canada) Brady Gollan	5
(England) David Taylor	4
(England) Steve James	5
(England) Ray Edmonds	3
(England) Mick Price	5
(Wales) Doug Mountjoy	2
(Wales) Wayne Jones	5
(England) Karl Payne	1
(New Zealand) Dene O'Kane	5
(England) Mark Davis	2
(England) Joe Johnson	5
(England) Jason Ferguson	3

Last 32; Best of 9 frames
(Thailand) James Wattana	5
(Wales) Terry Griffiths	0
(England) Danny Fowler	5
(Canada) Alain Robidoux	2
(Canada) Cliff Thorburn	5
(England) Andy Hicks	2
(England) Dean Reynolds	5
(Wales) Cliff Wilson	2
(England) Nigel Bond	5
(Northern Ireland) Dennis Taylor	3
(England) Jonathan Birch	5
(Australia) Eddie Charlton	4
(Hong Kong) Franky Chan	5
(Scotland) Billy Snaddon	3
(England) Tony Meo	5
(England) Gary Wilkinson	1
(England) John Parrott	5
(England) Peter Lines	2
(England) Martin Clark	5
(Northern Ireland) Joe Swail	2
(England) David Roe	5
(Malta) Tony Drago	4
(Wales) Darren Morgan	5
(England) Brian Morgan	4
(Republic of Ireland) Ken Doherty	5
(Wales) Colin Roscoe	4
(Canada) Brady Gollan	5
(England) Steve James	4
(England) Mick Price	5
(Wales) Wayne Jones	1
(New Zealand) Dene O'Kane	5
(England) Joe Johnson	2

Last 16; Best of 9 frames
(Thailand) James Wattana	5
(England) Danny Fowler	1
(Canada) Cliff Thorburn	5
(England) Dean Reynolds	1
(England) Nigel Bond	5
(England) Jonathan Birch	3
(Hong Kong) Franky Chan	5
(England) Tony Meo	3
(England) John Parrott	5
(England) Martin Clark	2
(England) David Roe	5
(Wales) Darren Morgan	2
(Republic of Ireland) Ken Doherty	5
(Canada) Brady Gollan	2
(England) Mick Price	5
(New Zealand) Dene O'Kane	1

Quarter-finals; Best of 9 frames
(Thailand) James Wattana	5
(Canada) Cliff Thorburn	2
(England) Nigel Bond	5
(Hong Kong) Franky Chan	1
(England) John Parrott	5
(England) David Roe	2
(Republic of Ireland) Ken Doherty	5
(England) Mick Price	2

Semi-finals; Best of 17 frames
(Thailand) James Wattana	9
(England) Nigel Bond	5
(England) John Parrott	9
(Republic of Ireland) Ken Doherty	7

Final; Best of 17 frames
(Thailand) James Wattana	9
(England) John Parrott	5
