= 1990 British Open =

1990 Pearl Assurance British Open
Tournament information
- Dates: 18 February – 3 March 1990
- Venue: Assembly Rooms
- City: Derby
- Country: England
- Organisation: WPBSA
- Format: Ranking event
- Total prize fund: £365,000
- Winner's share: £75,000
- Highest break: Jimmy White (ENG) (138)

Final
- Champion: Bob Chaperon (CAN)
- Runner-up: Alex Higgins (NIR)
- Score: 10–8

The 1990 British Open (officially the 1990 Pearl Assurance British Open) was a professional ranking snooker tournament, that was held from 18 February to 3 March 1990 with television coverage beginning on 24 February at the Assembly Rooms in Derby, England. It is an open draw for every round

Bob Chaperon won his only ranking event as he beat Alex Higgins who was appearing in his last major final.

== Main draw ==
Last 64; Best of 9 frames
(England) Tony Meo	5
(England) Roger Bales	2
(England) Jimmy White	5
(England) John Spencer	4
(England) Steve James	5
(England) Bill Oliver	1
(South Africa) Silvino Francisco	4
(Isle of Man) Tony Wilson	5
(England) Tony Knowles	5
(Canada) Brady Gollan	2
(New Zealand) Dene O'Kane	1
(Thailand) James Wattana	5
(Wales) Cliff Wilson	3
(England) Les Dodd	5
(Wales) Wayne Jones	4
(England) Mark Rowing	5
(Northern Ireland) Dennis Taylor	5
(England) Danny Fowler	1
(England) Barry West	0
(Scotland) Murdo MacLeod	5
(England) Martin Clark	5
(Republic of Ireland) Stephen Murphy	2
(England) John Virgo	1
(Republic of Ireland) Paddy Browne	5
(Northern Ireland) Alex Higgins	5
(England) Bob Harris	3
(England) Willie Thorne	1
(Wales) Mark Bennett	5
(Wales) Doug Mountjoy	5
(England) Nick Terry	3
(England) Dean Reynolds	5
(Wales) Tony Chappel	2
(England) Neal Foulds	5
(England) Ian Graham	2
(Malta) Tony Drago	5
(England) Steve Longworth	0
(Wales) Terry Griffiths	5
(England) Gary Wilkinson	4
(South Africa) Peter Francisco	5
(England) David Taylor	4
(England) John Parrott	1
(England) Steve Duggan	5
(Australia) Eddie Charlton	3
(Canada) Alain Robidoux	5
(England) Mike Hallett	5
(England) Graham Miles	1
(Canada) Bob Chaperon	5
(Scotland) Jim Donnelly	0
(Republic of Ireland) Eugene Hughes	5
(England) Mark Johnston-Allen	1
(England) Rex Williams	5
(Scotland) Eddie Sinclair	3
(England) Joe Johnson	w/o
(Canada) Jim Wych	w/o
(England) David Roe	3
(England) Robert Marshall	5
(Wales) Steve Newbury	5
(England) Jon Wright	3
(Canada) Cliff Thorburn	3
(Northern Ireland) Tommy Murphy	5
(England) Steve Davis	5
(Canada) Kirk Stevens	2
(Scotland) Stephen Hendry	4
(Wales) Darren Morgan	5

Last 32; Best of 9 frames
(England) Tony Meo	0
(England) Jimmy White	5
(England) Steve James	5
(Isle of Man) Tony Wilson	0
(England) Tony Knowles	5
(Thailand) James Wattana	3
(England) Les Dodd	5
(England) Mark Rowing	2
(Northern Ireland) Dennis Taylor	5
(Scotland) Murdo MacLeod	2
(England) Martin Clark	5
(Republic of Ireland) Paddy Browne	2
(Northern Ireland) Alex Higgins	5
(Wales) Mark Bennett	2
(Wales) Doug Mountjoy	5
(England) Dean Reynolds	2
(England) Neal Foulds	5
(Malta) Tony Drago	0
(Wales) Terry Griffiths	1
(South Africa) Peter Francisco	5
(England) Steve Duggan	4
(Canada) Alain Robidoux	5
(England) Mike Hallett	3
(Canada) Bob Chaperon	5
(Republic of Ireland) Eugene Hughes	5
(England) Rex Williams	2
(England) Joe Johnson	4
(England) Robert Marshall	5
(Wales) Steve Newbury	5
(Northern Ireland) Tommy Murphy	2
(England) Steve Davis	5
(Wales) Darren Morgan	4

Last 16; Best of 9 frames
(England) Jimmy White	4
(England) Steve James	5
(England) Tony Knowles	4
(England) Les Dodd	5
(Northern Ireland) Dennis Taylor	3
(England) Martin Clark	5
(Northern Ireland) Alex Higgins	5
(Wales) Doug Mountjoy	3
(England) Neal Foulds	5
(South Africa) Peter Francisco	3
(Canada) Alain Robidoux	4
(Canada) Bob Chaperon	5
(Republic of Ireland) Eugene Hughes	0
(England) Robert Marshall	5
(Wales) Steve Newbury	5
(England) Steve Davis	2

Quarter-finals; Best of 9 frames
(England) Steve James	5
(England) Les Dodd	2
(England) Martin Clark	3
(Northern Ireland) Alex Higgins	5
(England) Neal Foulds	3
(Canada) Bob Chaperon	5
(England) Robert Marshall	5
(Wales) Steve Newbury	4

Semi-finals; Best of 17 frames
(England) Steve James	3
(Northern Ireland) Alex Higgins	9
(Canada) Bob Chaperon	9
(England) Robert Marshall	5

Final; Best of 19 frames
(Northern Ireland) Alex Higgins	8
(Canada) Bob Chaperon	10

== Final ==
Final: Best of 19 frames. Referee: Alan Chamberlain; Assembly Rooms, Derby, England. 3 March 1990.
Bob Chaperon; Canada	10–8	Alex Higgins; Northern Ireland
Afternoon: 35–58, 115–1 (110), 57–10, 99–20, 73–30, 44–68, 7–61, 34–61; Evening: 33–73, 64–45, 99–2, 52–63, 70–17, 8–83, 76–19, 14–82, 69–36, 81–18
110	Highest break	
1	Century breaks	0
1	50+ breaks	0
