= 1992 Welsh Open (snooker) =

1992 Regal Welsh Open
Tournament information
- Dates: 10–16 February 1992
- Venue: Newport Leisure Centre
- City: Newport
- Country: Wales
- Organisation: WPBSA
- Format: Ranking event
- Total prize fund: £120,000
- Winner's share: £25,000
- Highest break: Darren Morgan (WAL) (132)

Final
- Champion: Stephen Hendry (SCO)
- Runner-up: Darren Morgan (WAL)
- Score: 9–3

The 1992 Welsh Open (officially the 1992 Regal Welsh Open) was the inaugural staging of the professional ranking snooker tournament that took place between 10 and 16 February 1992 at the Newport Leisure Centre in Newport, Wales.

Stephen Hendry won the tournament, defeating Darren Morgan 9–3 in the final.

== Main draw ==
Last 64; Best of 9 frames
(Scotland) Stephen Hendry	5
(Scotland) Euan Henderson	0
(Canada) Bob Chaperon	5
(England) Jimmy Michie	1
(Wales) Terry Griffiths	5
(England) Craig Edwards	4
(Wales) Wayne Jones	5
(Canada) Cliff Thorburn	4
(England) Steve James	5
(England) Rod Lawler	0
(England) John Virgo	5
(England) Nigel Gilbert	3
(England) Joe Johnson	5
(Scotland) Paul McPhillips	3
(England) Tony Knowles	5
(Hong Kong) Franky Chan	4
(England) Nigel Bond	5
(Republic of Ireland) Eugene Hughes	0
(New Zealand) Dene O'Kane	5
(England) Ian Graham	1
(England) Neal Foulds	5
(England) Anthony Hamilton	4
(South Africa) Silvino Francisco	5
(Canada) Kirk Stevens	0
(England) James Wattana	5
(England) Nick Terry	1
(England) Jamie Woodman	5
(Wales) Doug Mountjoy	4
(England) Dean Reynolds	5
(England) Bill Oliver	3
(Wales) Mark Bennett	5
(Scotland) Duncan Campbell	3
(Wales) Darren Morgan	5
(England) David Roe	3
(England) Nick Dyson	5
(Canada) Alain Robidoux	3
(Wales) Cliff Wilson	5
(Wales) Paul Davies	3
(Republic of Ireland) Ken Doherty	5
(England) Mike Hallett	0
(England) Gary Wilkinson	5
(England) Jonathan Birch	2
(Scotland) Alan McManus	5
(Malta) Tony Drago	3
(South Africa) Peter Francisco	5
(England) Andrew Cairns	2
(England) Martin Clark	5
(Canada) Brady Gollan	3
(England) John Parrott	5
(England) Dave Martin	0
(England) Danny Fowler	5
(Isle of Man) Tony Wilson	4
(England) Tony Jones	5
(Wales) Tony Chappel	0
(Northern Ireland) Jason Prince	5
(Wales) Steve Newbury	0
(England) Willie Thorne	5
(England) Peter Lines	4
(England) Tony Meo	5
(England) Martin Smith	2
(Northern Ireland) Dennis Taylor	5
(England) Brian Morgan	0
(Australia) Eddie Charlton	5
(Australia) Warren King	2

Last 32; Best of 9 frames
(Scotland) Stephen Hendry	5
(Canada) Bob Chaperon	4
(Wales) Terry Griffiths	5
(Wales) Wayne Jones	4
(England) Steve James	5
(England) John Virgo	4
(England) Joe Johnson	5
(England) Tony Knowles	0
(England) Nigel Bond	5
(New Zealand) Dene O'Kane	2
(England) Neal Foulds	5
(South Africa) Silvino Francisco	1
(Thailand) James Wattana	5
(England) Jamie Woodman	2
(England) Dean Reynolds	5
(Wales) Mark Bennett	4
(Wales) Darren Morgan	5
(England) Nick Dyson	4
(Wales) Cliff Wilson	5
(Republic of Ireland) Ken Doherty	2
(England) Gary Wilkinson	5
(Scotland) Alan McManus	2
(South Africa) Peter Francisco	5
(England) Martin Clark	4
(England) John Parrott	5
(England) Danny Fowler	1
(England) Tony Jones	5
(Northern Ireland) Jason Prince	2
(England) Willie Thorne	5
(England) Tony Meo	4
(Northern Ireland) Dennis Taylor	5
(Australia) Eddie Charlton	1

Last 16; Best of 9 frames
(Scotland) Stephen Hendry	5
(Wales) Terry Griffiths	1
(England) Steve James	5
(England) Joe Johnson	0
(England) Nigel Bond	5
(England) Neal Foulds	3
(Thailand) James Wattana	5
(England) Dean Reynolds	0
(Wales) Darren Morgan	5
(Wales) Cliff Wilson	1
(England) Gary Wilkinson	5
(South Africa) Peter Francisco	2
(England) John Parrott	5
(England) Tony Jones	1
(England) Willie Thorne	5
(Northern Ireland) Dennis Taylor	2

Quarter-finals; Best of 9 frames
(Scotland) Stephen Hendry	5
(England) Steve James	4
(England) Nigel Bond	5
(Thailand) James Wattana	4
(Wales) Darren Morgan	5
(England) Gary Wilkinson	3
(England) John Parrott	5
(England) Willie Thorne	2

Semi-finals; Best of 11 frames
(Scotland) Stephen Hendry	6
(England) Nigel Bond	1
(Wales) Darren Morgan	6
(England) John Parrott	3

Final; Best of 17 frames
(Scotland) Stephen Hendry	9
(Wales) Darren Morgan	3
