= David Roe =

English snooker player

Personal information
- Born: 11 September 1965 (age 61) Derby, Derbyshire, England

Sport
- Country: England
- Sport: Snooker
- Professional: 1986–2010
- Highest ranking: 13 (1994/95)
- Best ranking finish: Quarter-final (x4)

David Roe (born 11 September 1965) is an English former professional snooker player, and a four-time ranking tournament quarter-finalist.

== Career ==
Roe was born on 11 September 1965 in Derby. He began his professional career for the 1986–87 snooker season after qualifying through the pro-ticket series. In his second professional season he reached the last 32 or better in four tournaments, and a year later he reached the last 16 of the 1989 World Snooker Championship on his debut in the main event, to reach the top 32 of the rankings. He then had two poorer seasons, before two quarter-finals in 1991/1992. A year later he reached the top 16, despite not reaching a quarter-final in that season.

Roe spent three successive seasons in the Top 16 and reached a highest position of 13th in 1994/1995 (up from, and back down to, no. 16 in 1993/1994 and 1995/1996 respectively). Roe fell out of the top 32 after a succession of early defeats, and never regained this status.

A run to the last 16 of the China Open was the best finish of Roe's 2005–06 season. He had to win three qualifying matches to secure his position at the Beijing event, where he defeated Li Yin Xi (a wild card) and Paul Hunter, before ultimately losing 5–3 to Joe Swail. In 2006/2007 his best were two last-32 runs, and another followed at the 2008 Welsh Open. He won just two matches in the 2008/2009 season, causing him to drop to 62nd in the rankings.

Roe dropped off the tour at the end of the 2009/2010 season, after 24 years as a professional. He moved to Iran, where he coached their national team, and converted to Islam. He later became a snooker coach at the Hong Kong Sports Institute, working with women's world champion Ng On-yee.

== Performance and rankings timeline ==
Tournament	1986/ 87	1987/ 88	1988/ 89	1989/ 90	1990/ 91	1991/ 92	1992/ 93	1993/ 94	1994/ 95	1995/ 96	1996/ 97	1997/ 98	1998/ 99	1999/ 00	2000/ 01	2001/ 02	2002/ 03	2003/ 04	2004/ 05	2005/ 06	2006/ 07	2007/ 08	2008/ 09	2009/ 10
Ranking (Note: From the 2010/2011 season it shows the ranking at the beginning of the season.)	(Note: New players on the Main Tour don't have a ranking.)	83	39	26	36	50	32	16	13	16	34	49	48	58	55	49	48	57	52	61	56	55	52	62
Ranking tournaments
Shanghai Masters	Tournament Not Held																					LQ	LQ	LQ
Grand Prix (Note: The event was also called the LG Cup (2001/2002–2003/2004))	1R	2R	1R	1R	LQ	LQ	2R	2R	1R	1R	LQ	2R	2R	LQ	LQ	LQ	LQ	1R	1R	1R	RR	LQ	LQ	LQ
UK Championship	1R	3R	3R	1R	2R	1R	2R	3R	1R	1R	1R	LQ	1R	1R	LQ	LQ	1R	LQ	LQ	LQ	LQ	LQ	LQ	LQ
Welsh Open	Tournament Not Held					1R	2R	QF	1R	1R	LQ	1R	1R	2R	LQ	LQ	LQ	LQ	1R	1R	LQ	2R	LQ	LQ
China Open (Note: The event was also called the China International (1997/1998–1998/1999))	Tournament Not Held											NR	LQ	LQ	LQ	LQ	Not Held		LQ	2R	LQ	LQ	LQ	LQ
World Championship	LQ	LQ	2R	LQ	LQ	LQ	1R	1R	2R	1R	LQ	LQ	LQ	LQ	1R	LQ	LQ	LQ	LQ	LQ	LQ	LQ	LQ	LQ
Non-ranking tournaments
The Masters	A	A	A	A	LQ	LQ	LQ	WR	1R	WR	LQ	A	LQ	LQ	LQ	LQ	LQ	LQ	A	LQ	LQ	A	LQ	A
Former ranking tournaments
Canadian Masters	NR		LQ	Tournament Not Held																				
Hong Kong Open (Note: The event was also called the Australian Masters (1986/1987–1987/1988 and 1995/1996) and Australian Open (1994/1995))	NR		NH	3R	Tournament Not Held				NR		Tournament Not Held													
Classic	LQ	LQ	1R	1R	2R	LQ	Tournament Not Held																	
Strachan Open	Tournament Not Held					QF	Tournament Not Held																	
Dubai Classic (Note: The event was also called the Dubai Masters (1988/1989), Thailand Classic (1995/1996) and Asian Classic (1996/1997))	Not Held		NR	3R	1R	QF	3R	1R	2R	1R	LQ	Tournament Not Held												
German Masters (Note: The event was also called the German Open (1995/1996–1997/1998))	Tournament Not Held									QF	LQ	LQ	NR	Tournament Not Held										
Malta Grand Prix	Tournament Not Held								Non-Ranking Event					LQ	NR	Tournament Not Held								
Thailand Masters (Note: The event was also called the Asian Open (1989/1990–1992/1993) and Thailand Open (1993/1994–1996/1997))	NR		Not Held		2R	LQ	3R	2R	LQ	2R	2R	LQ	LQ	LQ	1R	LQ	LQ	NR	Not Held			NR	Not Held	
Scottish Open (Note: The event was also called the International Open (1986/1987–1989/1990 and 1992/1993–1996/1997) and Players Championship (2003/2004))	LQ	2R	1R	1R	Not Held		2R	3R	2R	3R	2R	2R	1R	LQ	2R	LQ	LQ	LQ	Tournament Not Held					
British Open	1R	3R	2R	1R	1R	1R	3R	2R	1R	1R	LQ	LQ	1R	LQ	LQ	1R	LQ	LQ	1R	Tournament Not Held				
Irish Masters	Non-Ranking Event																LQ	LQ	LQ	NH	NR	Not Held		
Malta Cup (Note: The event was also called the European Open (1988/1989–1996/1997 and 2001/2002–2003/2004) and Irish Open (1998/1999))	Not Held		2R	2R	LQ	2R	2R	2R	2R	1R	LQ	NH	LQ	Not Held		LQ	1R	1R	LQ	LQ	1R	NR	Not Held	
Northern Ireland Trophy	Tournament Not Held																			NR	2R	LQ	LQ	NH
Bahrain Championship	Tournament Not Held																						LQ	NH
Former non-ranking tournaments
English Professional Championship	LQ	LQ	2R	Tournament Not Held																				
Shoot-Out	Tournament Not Held				QF	Tournament Not Held																		
Pot Black	Tournament Not Held					A	A	QF	Tournament Not Held											A	A	A	Not Held	
Red & White Challenge	Tournament Not Held									SF	Tournament Not Held													
Guangzhou Masters	Tournament Not Held									QF	Tournament Not Held													
Malta Grand Prix	Tournament Not Held									A	QF	A	A	A	R	A	Tournament Not Held							
Charity Challenge (Note: The event was also called the Champions Cup (2000/2001–2002/2003))	Tournament Not Held									1R	1R	A	A	A	A	A	A	Tournament Not Held						

Performance table legend
LQ	lost in the qualifying draw	#R	lost in the early rounds of the tournament (WR = Wildcard round, RR = Round robin)	QF	lost in the quarter-finals
SF	lost in the semi–finals	F	lost in the final	W	won the tournament
DNQ	did not qualify for the tournament	A	did not participate in the tournament	WD	withdrew from the tournament

NH / Not Held	event was not held.
NR / Non-Ranking Event	event is/was no longer a ranking event.
R / Ranking Event	event is/was a ranking event.
MR / Minor-Ranking Event	event is/was a minor-ranking event.

== Career finals ==
=== Non-ranking finals: 1 (1 title) ===
Outcome	No.	Year	Championship	Opponent in the final	Score
Winner	1.	1995	WPBSA Minor Tour Event – 5	(Malta) Tony Drago	6–3

=== Pro-am finals: 1 ===
Outcome	No.	Year	Championship	Opponent in the final	Score
Runner-up	1.	1985	Warners Open	(England) Steve James	2–4

=== Amateur finals: 2 (1 title) ===
Outcome	No.	Year	Championship	Opponent in the final	Score
Winner	1.	1984	WPBSA Pro Ticket Series Event 1	(England) Jon Wright	5–4
Runner-up	1.	1984	WPBSA Pro Ticket Series Event 2	(England) Jon Wright	1–5
