= 1992 Indian Masters =

Invitational snooker tournament

1992 Gold Flake Indian Masters
Tournament information
- Dates: 1–22 August 1992
- Venue: Delhi
- Country: India
- Format: Non-ranking event
- Winner's share: £5,000
- Highest break: Peter Ebdon (ENG), 141

Final
- Champion: Steve Davis (ENG)
- Runner-up: Steve James (ENG)
- Score: 9–6

The 1992 Gold Flake Indian Masters was an invitational non-ranking snooker tournament held in Delhi, India in August 1992. Four professionals entered the event, Steve Davis, Steve James, Willie Thorne and Peter Ebdon, joining two Indians better known for their prowess at billiards, Geet Sethi and Michael Ferreira, plus two leading lady players, Stacey Hillyard and Karen Corr. The group standings were decided on aggregate frames won rather than matches.

Steve Davis won the tournament and winners' prize money of £5,000, defeating Steve James 9–6 in the final, making four century breaks and a break of 99 during the match. Three of the century breaks were made after the players went into the final session level at 4–4.

Davis had wins over Ferreira (5–0), Corr (4–1), and Ebdon (4–1) in the group stage; whilst James defeated Hillyard (3–2), Thorne (3–2) and Sethi (3–2). Ebdon compiled the highest break of the tournament, 141, in his 4–1 defeat of Corr.
