= 1990 Dubai Classic =

Dubai Classic
Tournament information
- Dates: 5–11 November 1990
- Venue: Al Nasr Stadium
- City: Dubai
- Country: United Arab Emirates
- Organisation: WPBSA
- Format: Ranking event
- Total prize fund: £200,000
- Winner's share: £35,000
- Highest break: Gary Wilkinson (ENG) (105)

Final
- Champion: Stephen Hendry (SCO)
- Runner-up: Steve Davis (ENG)
- Score: 9–1

The 1990 Dubai Duty Free Classic was a professional ranking snooker tournament, which took place from 5 to 11 November 1990 at the Al Nasr Stadium in Dubai, United Arab Emirates.

Defending champion Stephen Hendry won the tournament, defeating Steve Davis 9–1 in the final.

== Main draw ==
Last 64; Best of 9 frames
(Scotland) Stephen Hendry	5
(England) Ian Graham	1
(Canada) Alain Robidoux	5
(Republic of Ireland) Ken Doherty	4
(England) Neal Foulds	5
(England) Andrew Cairns	1
(Wales) Steve Newbury	5
(Australia) Warren King	3
(England) Mike Hallett	5
(England) Ian Williamson	1
(Wales) Wayne Jones	5
(England) Nick Terry	1
(Wales) Darren Morgan	5
(England) Barry West	1
(England) Willie Thorne	5
(Northern Ireland) Tommy Murphy	3
(England) Dean Reynolds	5
(Northern Ireland) Jack McLaughlin	4
(Thailand) James Wattana	5
(Australia) Eddie Charlton	2
(Northern Ireland) Jason Prince	w/o
(Northern Ireland) Alex Higgins	w/d
(Malta) Tony Drago	5
(England) David Taylor	2
(England) Rex Williams	5
(England) John Virgo	4
(England) Rod Lawler	5
(England) Danny Fowler	0
(Hong Kong) Franky Chan	5
(Wales) Cliff Wilson	2
(England) Jimmy White	5
(England) Ray Edmonds	4
(England) Steve Davis	5
(England) Bob Harris	1
(South Africa) Peter Francisco	5
(Wales) Mark Bennett	1
(Canada) Jim Wych	5
(England) Joe Johnson	1
(Republic of Ireland) Stephen Murphy	5
(Northern Ireland) Dennis Taylor	4
(Wales) Terry Griffiths	5
(Northern Ireland) Joe O'Boye	0
(England) Jonathan Birch	5
(Canada) Bob Chaperon	0
(England) Jason Whittaker	5
(Canada) Cliff Thorburn	1
(Scotland) Duncan Campbell	5
(England) Tony Meo	3
(England) Gary Wilkinson	5
(England) Mark Rowing	1
(England) John Parrott	5
(Canada) Marcel Gauvreau	1
(South Africa) Silvino Francisco	5
(Scotland) Alan McManus	2
(England) Steve James	5
(England) David Roe	2
(Wales) Doug Mountjoy	5
(Canada) Kirk Stevens	2
(England) Tony Knowles	5
(Scotland) John Rea	1
(England) Martin Clark	5
(England) Nigel Bond	3
(New Zealand) Dene O'Kane	5
(England) Mark Johnston-Allen	2

Last 32; Best of 9 frames
(Scotland) Stephen Hendry	5
(Canada) Alain Robidoux	1
(England) Neal Foulds	5
(Wales) Steve Newbury	2
(England) Mike Hallett	5
(Wales) Wayne Jones	2
(Wales) Darren Morgan	5
(England) Willie Thorne	2
(England) Dean Reynolds	5
(Thailand) James Wattana	3
(Northern Ireland) Jason Prince	5
(Malta) Tony Drago	4
(England) Rex Williams	5
(England) Rod Lawler	2
(Hong Kong) Franky Chan	5
(England) Jimmy White	3
(England) Steve Davis	5
(South Africa) Peter Francisco	1
(Canada) Jim Wych	5
(Republic of Ireland) Stephen Murphy	3
(Wales) Terry Griffiths	5
(England) Jonathan Birch	2
(England) Jason Whittaker	5
(Scotland) Duncan Campbell	3
(England) Gary Wilkinson	5
(England) John Parrott	3
(South Africa) Silvino Francisco	5
(England) Steve James	3
(Wales) Doug Mountjoy	5
(England) Tony Knowles	3
(England) Martin Clark	5
(New Zealand) Dene O'Kane	1

Last 16; Best of 9 frames
(Scotland) Stephen Hendry	5
(England) Neal Foulds	1
(England) Mike Hallett	5
(Wales) Darren Morgan	2
(England) Dean Reynolds	5
(Northern Ireland) Jason Prince	4
(England) Rex Williams	5
(Hong Kong) Franky Chan	2
(England) Steve Davis	5
(Canada) Jim Wych	2
(Wales) Terry Griffiths	5
(England) Jason Whittaker	0
(England) Gary Wilkinson	5
(South Africa) Silvino Francisco	2
(Wales) Doug Mountjoy	5
(England) Martin Clark	0

Quarter-finals; Best of 9 frames
(Scotland) Stephen Hendry	5
(England) Mike Hallett	0
(England) Dean Reynolds	5
(England) Rex Williams	2
(England) Steve Davis	5
(Wales) Terry Griffiths	2
(England) Gary Wilkinson	5
(Wales) Doug Mountjoy	4

Semi-finals; Best of 11 frames
(Scotland) Stephen Hendry	6
(England) Dean Reynolds	1
(England) Steve Davis	6
(England) Gary Wilkinson	4

Final; Best of 17 frames
(Scotland) Stephen Hendry	9
(England) Steve Davis	1
