= 1996 International Open =

1996 Sweater Shop International Open
Tournament information
- Dates: 17–24 February 1996
- Venue: Link Centre
- City: Swindon
- Country: England
- Organisation: WPBSA
- Format: Ranking event
- Total prize fund: £321,400
- Winner's share: £60,000
- Highest break: 144

Final
- Champion: John Higgins (SCO)
- Runner-up: Rod Lawler (ENG)
- Score: 9–3

The 1996 International Open (officially the 1996 Sweater Shop International Open) was a professional ranking snooker tournament that took place between 17 and 24 February 1996 at the Link Centre in Swindon, England.

John Higgins defended his title by defeating Rod Lawler 9–3 in the final. This was the first time that Lawler reached the final of a ranking event.

== Prize fund ==
The breakdown of prize money for this year is shown below:

- Winner: £60,000
- Runner-up: £32,000
- Semi-final: £16,000
- Quarter-final: £9,050
- Last 16: £4,550
- Last 32: £2,600
- Last 64: £1,900
- Last 96: £700
- Stage one highest break: £1,200
- Stage two highest break: £2,400
- Total: £321,400

== Main draw ==
Last 64; Best of 9 frames
1	(Scotland) John Higgins	5
(Scotland) Graeme Dott	0
18	(New Zealand) Dene O'Kane	2
(Wales) Mark Williams	5
28	(England) Neal Foulds	5
(England) Pat Horne	1
12	(England) Nigel Bond	5
(England) Karl Payne	1
9	(Wales) Darren Morgan	3
(England) Karl Broughton	5
25	(England) Willie Thorne	4
(Wales) Wayne Jones	5
26	(England) Steve James	3
(Scotland) David McLellan	5
7	(Scotland) Alan McManus	4
(Scotland) Chris Small	5
5	(England) John Parrott	4
(England) Stephen Lee	5
32	(Northern Ireland) Dennis Taylor	5
(England) Tony Jones	3
31	(England) Anthony Hamilton	5
(Wales) Mark Bennett	2
11	(England) Peter Ebdon	4
(England) Joe Johnson	5
14	(Malta) Tony Drago	5
(Northern Ireland) Terry Murphy	2
24	(England) Tony Knowles	4
(England) Mark Rowing	5
20	(Canada) Alain Robidoux	5
(England) Mike Hallett	1
4	(England) Ronnie O'Sullivan	3
(Republic of Ireland) Fergal O'Brien	5
3	(England) Steve Davis	3
(Northern Ireland) Jason Prince	5
21	(England) Mick Price	4
(England) Nick Pearce	5
23	(England) Gary Wilkinson	5
(England) Paul Wykes	3
16	(England) David Roe	5
(England) Jim Chambers	2
13	(England) Dave Harold	5
(England) Mark Davis	2
17	(England) Andy Hicks	4
(Scotland) Drew Henry	5
29	(England) Jason Ferguson	5
(England) Stefan Mazrocis	2
6	(Thailand) James Wattana	3
(Republic of Ireland) Michael Judge	5
8	(England) Jimmy White	1
(England) David Finbow	5
30	(Northern Ireland) Dean Reynolds	0
(England) Mark King	5
27	(England) Brian Morgan	3
(Scotland) Marcus Campbell	5
10	(Republic of Ireland) Ken Doherty	2
(England) Gary Ponting	5
15	(Wales) Terry Griffiths	3
(Scotland) Billy Snaddon	5
19	(Northern Ireland) Joe Swail	5
(England) Barry Pinches	2
22	(England) Martin Clark	0
(England) Rod Lawler	5
2	(Scotland) Stephen Hendry	5
(England) Brian Rowswell	1

Last 32; Best of 9 frames
1	(Scotland) John Higgins	5
(Wales) Mark Williams	2
28	(England) Neal Foulds	5
12	(England) Nigel Bond	2
(England) Karl Broughton	5
(Wales) Wayne Jones	4
(Scotland) David McLellan	4
(Scotland) Chris Small	5
(England) Stephen Lee	5
32	(Northern Ireland) Dennis Taylor	0
31	(England) Anthony Hamilton	5
(England) Joe Johnson	4
14	(Malta) Tony Drago	5
(England) Mark Rowing	2
20	(Canada) Alain Robidoux	5
(Republic of Ireland) Fergal O'Brien	2
(Northern Ireland) Jason Prince	2
(England) Nick Pearce	5
24	(England) Gary Wilkinson	2
16	(England) David Roe	5
13	(England) Dave Harold	5
(Scotland) Drew Henry	4
29	(England) Jason Ferguson	5
(Republic of Ireland) Michael Judge	3
(England) David Finbow	5
(England) Mark King	3
(Scotland) Marcus Campbell	3
(England) Gary Ponting	5
(Scotland) Billy Snaddon	5
20	(Northern Ireland) Joe Swail	1
(England) Rod Lawler	5
2	(Scotland) Stephen Hendry	3

Last 16; Best of 9 frames
1	(Scotland) John Higgins	5
28	(England) Neal Foulds	1
(England) Karl Broughton	5
(Scotland) Chris Small	3
(England) Stephen Lee	5
31	(England) Anthony Hamilton	2
14	(Malta) Tony Drago	0
20	(Canada) Alain Robidoux	5
(England) Nick Pearce	5
16	(England) David Roe	2
13	(England) Dave Harold	5
29	(England) Jason Ferguson	0
(England) David Finbow	5
(England) Gary Ponting	2
(Scotland) Billy Snaddon	3
(England) Rod Lawler	5

Quarter-finals; Best of 9 frames
1	(Scotland) John Higgins	5
(England) Karl Broughton	2
(England) Stephen Lee	2
20	(Canada) Alain Robidoux	5
(England) Nick Pearce	5
13	(England) Dave Harold	2
(England) David Finbow	1
(England) Rod Lawler	5

Semi-finals; Best of 11 frames
1	(Scotland) John Higgins	6
20	(Canada) Alain Robidoux	4
(England) Nick Pearce	5
(England) Rod Lawler	6

Final; Best of 17 frames
1	(Scotland) John Higgins	9
(England) Rod Lawler	3

== Final ==
Final: Best of 17 frames. Referee: Jan Verhaas. Link Centre, Swindon, England, 24 February 1996.
John Higgins; Scotland	9–3	Rod Lawler; England
46–74(56), 79–4, 71–48, 104(104)–0, 85(76)–13, 59–23, 83(59)–20, 0–85(77), 86(55)–10, 58–69, 100(100)–17, 65(55)–28
104	Highest break	77
2	Century breaks	0
6	50+ breaks	2

== Century breaks ==
- 144, 129, 104, 100 – John Higgins
- 127, 106 – Dave Harold
- 124 – John Parrott
- 123 – Willie Thorne
- 119 – Ken Doherty
- 111 – Jim Chambers
- 108, 103 – Stephen Lee
- 107 – Wayne Jones
- 102 – David Finbow
- 102 – Terry Murphy
- 101 – Fergal O'Brien
- 100 – Peter Ebdon
