= 1990 World Series Challenge =

Snooker tournament, held August 1990 in Hong Kong

Tournament information
- Dates: 22–26 August 1990
- Venue: Hong Kong Hilton
- Country: Hong Kong
- Organisation: IMG
- Format: Non-ranking event
- Total prize fund: £71,000
- Winner's share: £20,000
- Highest break: James Wattana (127)

Final
- Champion: (Thailand) James Wattana
- Runner-up: (England) Jimmy White
- Score: 9–3

The 1990 World Series Challenge was an invitational snooker tournament played in Hong Kong from 22 to 26 August 1990, organised by IMG. It featured seven of the top eight ranked players (John Parrott was the exception, being replaced by Steve James), two other professionals James Wattana and Franky Chan, and two amateurs. James Wattana won the title by beating Jimmy White 9–3 in the final.

It was the first event of the 1990–91 snooker season. James Wattana beat four of the top six ranked players on his way to winning the title. He also compiled the highest break, 127, in the first frame of his match against Steve Davis. The event was televised and attracted twenty million viewers in Thailand.

== Prize Fund ==
The event was sponsored by 555 and had a total prize fund of £71,000 awarded as follows:

- Winner: £20,000
- Runner-up £10,000
- Semi-finals: £7500
- Quarter-finals £5,000
- First round: £1,500

== Main draw ==
First round Best of 9 frames
(England) Dean Reynolds	5
(Hong Kong) K. Kwok	0
(Wales) Terry Griffiths	0
(Thailand) James Wattana	5
(England) Mike Hallett	5
(Hong Kong) Franky Chan	1
(England) Steve James	5
(Thailand) U. Khaimuk	2

Quarter-finals; Best of 9 frames
(England) Steve Davis	5
(England) Dean Reynolds	2
(Wales) Doug Mountjoy	1
(Thailand) James Wattana	5
(England) Jimmy White	5
(England) Mike Hallett	3
(Scotland) Stephen Hendry	5
(England) Steve James	4

Semi-finals; Best of 9 frames
(England) Steve Davis	2
(Thailand) James Wattana	5
(England) Jimmy White	5
(Scotland) Stephen Hendry	2

Final; Best of 17 frames
(Thailand) James Wattana	9
(England) Jimmy White	3
