= 1991 Belgian Challenge =

Invitational snooker tournament

Tournament information
- Dates: 18–21 December 1991
- Venue: Matchroom Schijnpoort, Antwerp
- Country: Belgium
- Format: Non-ranking event

Final
- Champion: Steve Davis (ENG)
- Runner-up: Stephen Hendry (SCO)
- Score: 10–9

The 1991 Belgian Challenge (also referred to as the 1991 555 Belgian Challenge for the purposes of sponsorship) was an invitational non-ranking snooker tournament held at the Matchroom Schijnpoort, Antwerp from 18 to 21 December 1991. Steve Davis won the title, defeating Stephen Hendry 10–9 in the final.

In the first round, Hendry set a record for the quickest best-of-nine frames match by beating Mike Henson 5–0 in 51 minutes. Henson scored only ten points in the match. In the quarter-finals, Hendry whitewashed his opponent Gary Wilkinson, who had won the World Matchplay tournament five days previously, with Wilkinson scoring just 40 points across the first four of the five frames. In the semi-final, Hendry was on track for his first competitive maximum break by potting fourteen reds and fourteen blacks, but then snookered himself on the final red and did not pot it. Later in the match, Hallett also potted fourteen reds and blacks, but he missed a pot on the final red.

In the final, Davis trailed 3–6, but later led 8–7 after compiling breaks of 78, 102, 56 and 102. Hendry made it 8–8 with a break of 120, before Davis won the following frame. Recovering from 43 points behind to win the 18th frame, Hendry forced the match to a deciding frame. Davis won the last frame, making a break of 66, to win the title.

== Results ==
First round Best-of-9 frames
(England) Steve Davis	5
(France) Eric le Paul	0
(Wales) Terry Griffiths	5
(England) Steve James	2
(England) Jimmy White	5
(Netherlands) Rene Dikstra	4
(England) Neal Foulds	4
(Hong Kong) Franky Chan	5
(Scotland) Stephen Hendry	5
(Germany) Mike Henson	0
(England) Gary Wilkinson	5
(Thailand) James Wattana	3
(England) Mike Hallett	5
(Northern Ireland) Dennis Taylor	4
(England) John Parrott	5
(Belgium) Steve Lemmens	0

Quarter-finals; Best-of-9 frames
(England) Steve Davis	5
(Wales) Terry Griffiths	2
(England) Jimmy White	5
(Hong Kong) Franky Chan	0
(Scotland) Stephen Hendry	5
(England) Gary Wilkinson	0
(England) Mike Hallett	5
(England) John Parrott	3

Semi-finals; Best-of-9 frames
(England) Steve Davis	6
(England) Jimmy White	3
(Scotland) Stephen Hendry	6
(England) Mike Hallett	3

Final; Best-of-9 frames
(England) Steve Davis	10
(Scotland) Stephen Hendry	9
