= Tony Jones (snooker player) =

English snooker player (born 1960)

Personal information
- Born: 15 April 1960 (age 66) England

Sport
- Country: England
- Sport: Snooker
- Professional: 1983–2004
- Highest ranking: 15 (1991/1992)

Tournament wins
- Ranking: 1

Tony Jones (born 15 April 1960) is an English former professional snooker player from Nottinghamshire.

== Early life ==
From Sutton-in-Ashfield, Nottinghamshire, he won the Nottingham Junior Championship at the age of 15 years-old, but only started playing snooker seriously in 1981. That year, he moved to Chesterfield, Derbyshire, to become resident player/coach at the Chesterfield Snooker Centre despite never having been coached himself.

== Career ==
In 1983, Jones became the English Amateur Champion, beating Neal Foulds in the southern area final, and then John Parrott in the final itself, 13–9. He turned professional in 1983 and joined Ron Gross in London. He made his Crucible Theatre debut at the 1985 Snooker World Championship, losing 10-8 to Tony Knowles. He was also a World Championship doubles finalist (with partner Ray Reardon) in 1985, losing in the final 12-5 to Steve Davis and Tony Meo.

He had a run to the last 16 of the 1988 British Open ended by eventual winner Stephen Hendry. His ranking fluctuated inside the top-64 in the late 1980s, moving from world number 55 to no. 42 in 1987-88, and then to no. 49 and to no. 62 in 1989-90.

Jones was the surprise winner of the 1991 European Open in Rotterdam, when, ranked no. 35 in the world, he beat Mark Johnston-Allen 9–7, despite never having previously been beyond the quarter-final stage of a ranking tournament. He reached no. 15 in the 1991/1992 rankings as a result. He dropped out of the top sixteen the following season and slid down the rankings over the following seasons.

== Performance and rankings timeline ==
Tournament	1983/ 84	1984/ 85	1985/ 86	1986/ 87	1987/ 88	1988/ 89	1989/ 90	1990/ 91	1991/ 92	1992/ 93	1993/ 94	1994/ 95	1995/ 96	1996/ 97	1997/ 98	1998/ 99	1999/ 00	2000/ 01	2001/ 02	2002/ 03	2003/ 04	2004/ 05
Ranking (Note: From the 2010/2011 season it shows the ranking at the beginning of the season.)	(Note: He was an amateur.)	(Note: New players on the Main Tour do not have a ranking.)	50	55	46	49	62	35	15	22	29	34	43	63	60	63	65	79	96	84	85	(Note: He was not on the Main Tour.)
Ranking tournaments
Grand Prix (Note: The event was also called the Professional Players Tournament (1983/1984) and the LG Cup (2001/2002–2003/2004))	1R	2R	1R	1R	1R	1R	3R	1R	2R	1R	1R	LQ	LQ	QF	LQ	1R	LQ	LQ	LQ	LQ	LQ	A
British Open (Note: The event was also called the International Masters (1983/1984).)	NR	1R	1R	2R	3R	1R	LQ	QF	2R	1R	1R	1R	LQ	1R	LQ	1R	2R	LQ	LQ	LQ	LQ	A
UK Championship	NR	1R	1R	2R	1R	1R	2R	2R	3R	1R	3R	1R	1R	1R	2R	1R	LQ	LQ	LQ	LQ	LQ	A
Welsh Open	Tournament Not Held								3R	2R	1R	LQ	1R	LQ	1R	LQ	LQ	LQ	LQ	LQ	LQ	A
European Open (Note: The event was also called the Irish Open (1998/1999) and Malta Cup (2004/2005–2007/2008))	Tournament Not Held					1R	LQ	W	3R	1R	LQ	LQ	LQ	LQ	NR	LQ	Not Held		LQ	LQ	LQ	A
Irish Masters	Non-Ranking Event																			LQ	LQ	A
World Championship	LQ	1R	LQ	LQ	LQ	LQ	LQ	2R	1R	1R	LQ	LQ	LQ	LQ	LQ	LQ	LQ	LQ	LQ	LQ	LQ	LQ
Non-ranking tournaments
The Masters	A	A	A	A	A	A	A	LQ	WR	A	LQ	A	A	LQ	LQ	A	A	A	LQ	LQ	A	A
Former ranking tournaments
Canadian Masters	Not Held		Non-Ranking			LQ	Tournament Not Held															
Hong Kong Open	Non-Ranking Event					NH	3R	Not Held				NR		Tournament Not Held								
Classic	LQ	LQ	1R	LQ	LQ	LQ	LQ	LQ	LQ	Tournament Not Held												
Strachan Open	Tournament Not Held								1R	Tournament Not Held												
Dubai Classic (Note: The event was also called the Thailand Classic (1995/1996) and Asian Classic (1996/1997))	Tournament Not Held					NR	2R	LQ	1R	2R	LQ	LQ	LQ	LQ	Tournament Not Held							
German Open	Tournament Not Held												LQ	LQ	LQ	NR	Tournament Not Held					
Malta Grand Prix	Tournament Not Held											Non-Ranking Event					LQ	NR	Tournament Not Held			
China Open (Note: The event was also called the China International (1997/1998–1998/1999))	Tournament Not Held														NR	LQ	LQ	LQ	LQ	Not Held		
Thailand Masters (Note: The event was also called the Asian Open (1989/1990 to 1992/1993) and Thailand Open (1993/1994 to 1996/1997).)	Non-Ranking Event				Not Held		QF	LQ	1R	1R	1R	LQ	LQ	LQ	LQ	LQ	LQ	LQ	LQ	NR	Not Held	
Players Championship (Note: The event was also called the International Open (1983/1984 to 1984/1985, 1986/1987 to 1996/1997), Matchroom Trophy (1985/1986) and the Scottish Open (1998/1999 to 2002/2003).)	A	LQ	1R	LQ	LQ	1R	3R	Not Held		QF	2R	2R	1R	LQ	LQ	LQ	LQ	LQ	LQ	LQ	LQ	NH
Former non-ranking tournaments
UK Championship	1R	Tournament Not Held																				
British Open (Note: The event was also called the International Masters (1983/1984).)	LQ	Tournament Not Held																				
Canadian Masters	Not Held		QF	A	A	R	Tournament Not Held															
English Professional Championship	NH	1R	1R	1R	LQ	LQ	Tournament Not Held															
Shoot-Out	Tournament Not Held							1R	Tournament Not Held													
World Masters	Tournament Not Held							1R	Tournament Not Held													
Pot Black	A	A	A	Tournament Not Held					1R	A	A	Tournament Not Held										
World Matchplay	Tournament Not Held					A	A	A	1R	A	Tournament Not Held											

Performance Table Legend
LQ	lost in the qualifying draw	#R	lost in the early rounds of the tournament (WR = Wildcard round, RR = Round robin)	QF	lost in the quarter-finals
SF	lost in the semi-finals	F	lost in the final	W	won the tournament
DNQ	did not qualify for the tournament	A	did not participate in the tournament	WD	withdrew from the tournament

NH / Not Held	means an event was not held.
NR / Non-Ranking Event	means an event is/was no longer a ranking event.
R / Ranking Event	means an event is/was a ranking event.
MR / Minor-Ranking Event	means an event is/was a minor-ranking event.
PA / Pro-am Event	means an event is/was a pro-am event.

== Career finals ==
=== Ranking finals: 1 (1 title) ===
Outcome	No.	Year	Championship	Opponent in the final	Score
Winner	1.	1991	European Open	(England) Mark Johnston-Allen	9–7

=== Team finals: 1 ===
Outcome	No.	Year	Championship	Team/partner	Opponent(s) in the final	Score
Runner-up	1.	1985	World Doubles Championship	(Wales) Ray Reardon	(England) Steve Davis (England) Tony Meo	5–12

=== Amateur finals: 1 (1 title) ===
Outcome	No.	Year	Championship	Opponent in the final	Score
Winner	1.	1983	English Amateur Championship	(England) John Parrott	13–9
