= Steve James (snooker player) =

English snooker player

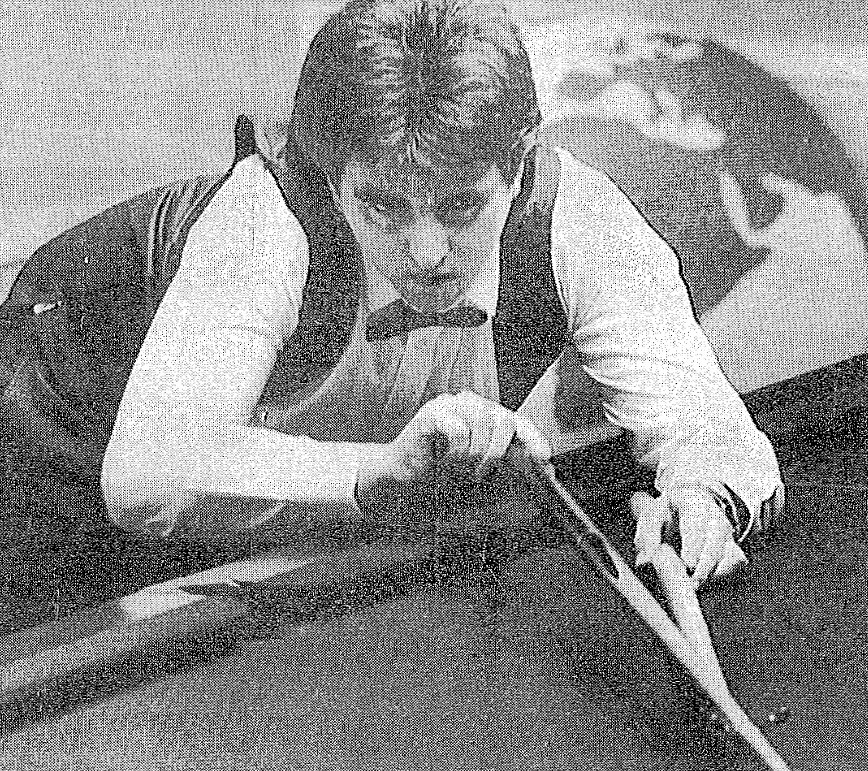
- James in 1988

Personal information
- Born: 2 May 1961 (age 65) Cannock, Staffordshire

Sport
- Country: England
- Sport: Snooker
- Professional: 1986–2002, 2004–2006
- Highest ranking: 7 (1991/1992)

Tournament wins
- Ranking: 1

Stephen James (born 2 May 1961 in Cannock) is an English retired professional snooker player.

== Career ==
James became a professional snooker player in 1986 based on his results in the Professional Ticket Tournaments in 1985.

In 1988, he was involved in a car accident ten days prior to his World Championship debut which flipped his car over into a field, although he escaped with only cuts, bruises and a black eye. He subsequently became the first debutant to score two centuries at The Crucible in his first round match of the 1988 Snooker World Championship against Rex Williams. He went on to reach the quarter-finals that year.

The high point of his career was his sole ranking title – the Classic in 1990, beating Australian Warren King 10–6 in the final. His world ranking peaked at number seven the following season, the best of his five seasons in the top sixteen.

On 14 April 1990, in his match against Alex Higgins at the World Snooker Championship in Sheffield, James became the first player to produce a 16-red total clearance in competitive play, with a break of 135. In other words, he potted 16 reds and 16 colours consecutively, followed by all the coloured balls in order: a situation that was only possible because he was awarded a free ball before any red had been potted.

A year later he reached the semi-finals of the World Snooker Championship, beating defending champion Stephen Hendry in the quarter-finals. He was defeated in the semi-final by Jimmy White.

He made his final appearance at the Snooker World Championship in 1999. He dropped off the World Snooker Tour in 2002, having failed to win a match that season.

== Personal life ==
A former postman, he was born in Cannock, Staffordshire. James became wealthy through snooker, but was banned from driving in 1996, and in 1998 declared himself bankrupt after spending £700,000 on "fast living", even having to sell his practice table. His financial problems saw him turn to drinking heavily. A diabetic, James missed the British Open in 2004 due to a kidney infection.

== Performance and rankings timeline ==
Tournament	1986/ 87	1987/ 88	1988/ 89	1989/ 90	1990/ 91	1991/ 92	1992/ 93	1993/ 94	1994/ 95	1995/ 96	1996/ 97	1997/ 98	1998/ 99	1999/ 00	2000/ 01	2001/ 02	2002/ 03	2003/ 04	2004/ 05	2005/ 06
Ranking (Note: From the 2010/2011 season it shows the ranking at the beginning of the season.)	(Note: New players on the Main Tour don't have a ranking.)	66	32	16	9	7	10	13	17	26	24	24	37	44	64	62	(Note: He was an amateur.)			85
Ranking tournaments
Grand Prix (Note: The event was also called the LG Cup (2001/2002–2003/2004))	LQ	1R	2R	1R	SF	3R	3R	3R	1R	SF	2R	1R	1R	1R	LQ	LQ	A	A	LQ	LQ
UK Championship	LQ	LQ	2R	1R	2R	QF	3R	2R	1R	1R	1R	1R	2R	1R	LQ	LQ	A	A	LQ	LQ
Malta Cup (Note: The event was also called the European Open (1988/1989–1996/1997 and 2001/2002–2003/2004) and Irish Open (1998/1999))	Not Held		1R	SF	3R	2R	3R	1R	1R	2R	LQ	NH	LQ	Not Held		LQ	A	A	LQ	A
Welsh Open	Tournament Not Held					QF	2R	3R	1R	1R	2R	2R	LQ	LQ	LQ	LQ	A	A	1R	WD
China Open (Note: The event was also called the China International (1997/1998–1998/1999))	Tournament Not Held											NR	LQ	LQ	LQ	LQ	Not Held		LQ	WD
World Championship	LQ	QF	1R	2R	SF	1R	2R	2R	LQ	1R	LQ	LQ	1R	LQ	LQ	LQ	LQ	LQ	LQ	A
Non-ranking tournaments
Pot Black	Tournament Not Held					1R	1R	SF	Tournament Not Held											A
The Masters	A	A	A	1R	QF	1R	QF	QF	LQ	LQ	LQ	LQ	LQ	LQ	LQ	A	A	LQ	A	A
Former ranking tournaments
Canadian Masters	NR		2R	Tournament Not Held																
Hong Kong Open (Note: The event was also called the Australian Masters (1986/1987–1987/1988 and 1995/1996) and Australian Open (1994/1995))	NR		NH	2R	Tournament Not Held				NR		Tournament Not Held									
Classic	LQ	1R	2R	W	1R	2R	Tournament Not Held													
Strachan Open	Tournament Not Held					2R	Tournament Not Held													
Dubai Classic (Note: The event was also called the Dubai Masters (1988/1989), Thailand Classic (1995/1996) and Asian Classic (1996/1997))	Not Held		NR	3R	2R	SF	1R	1R	LQ	LQ	1R	Tournament Not Held								
German Masters (Note: The event was also called the German Open (1995/1996–1997/1998))	Tournament Not Held									1R	LQ	2R	NR	Tournament Not Held						
Malta Grand Prix	Tournament Not Held								Non-Ranking Event					LQ	NR	Tournament Not Held				
Thailand Masters (Note: The event was also called the Asian Open (1989/1990–1992/1993) and Thailand Open (1993/1994–1996/1997))	NR		Not Held		2R	1R	1R	1R	1R	LQ	1R	LQ	1R	LQ	LQ	LQ	LQ	NR	Not Held	
Scottish Open (Note: The event was also called the International Open (1986/1987–1989/1990 and 1992/1993–1996/1997) and Players Championship (2003/2004))	LQ	3R	SF	3R	Not Held		3R	3R	1R	1R	2R	1R	1R	2R	1R	LQ	A	A	Not Held	
British Open	2R	2R	1R	SF	1R	2R	1R	2R	2R	2R	2R	1R	LQ	LQ	1R	LQ	A	A	WD	NH
Irish Masters	Non-Ranking Event																A	A	LQ	NH
Former non-ranking tournaments
English Professional Championship	2R	LQ	1R	Tournament Not Held																
Shoot-Out	Tournament Not Held				1R	Tournament Not Held														
World Masters	Tournament Not Held				1R	Tournament Not Held														
European Challenge	Tournament Not Held					QF	A	Tournament Not Held												
Thailand Masters	A	Not Held		Ranking		QF	Ranking Event										NR	Not Held		
Hong Kong Challenge	A	A	A	NH	QF	QF	Tournament Not Held													
Indian Challenge	Tournament Not Held					QF	Tournament Not Held													
Scottish Masters	A	A	NH	A	SF	SF	A	A	A	A	A	A	A	A	A	A	A	Not Held		
Belgian Masters	Tournament Not Held					QF	Not Held		A	Tournament Not Held										
World Matchplay	Not Held		A	A	1R	1R	A	Tournament Not Held												
Belgian Challenge	Tournament Not Held					1R	Tournament Not Held													
Irish Masters	A	A	A	A	QF	QF	A	A	A	A	A	A	A	A	A	A	Ranking Event			NH
Indian Masters	Tournament Not Held						F	Tournament Not Held												
Pontins Professional	A	A	A	A	A	W	SF	A	A	A	A	A	A	A	Tournament Not Held					

Performance table legend
LQ	lost in the qualifying draw	#R	lost in the early rounds of the tournament (WR = Wildcard round, RR = Round robin)	QF	lost in the quarter-finals
SF	lost in the semi–finals	F	lost in the final	W	won the tournament
DNQ	did not qualify for the tournament	A	did not participate in the tournament	WD	withdrew from the tournament

NH / Not Held	event was not held.
NR / Non-Ranking Event	event is/was no longer a ranking event.
R / Ranking Event	event is/was a ranking event.
MR / Minor-Ranking Event	event is/was a minor-ranking event.

== Career finals ==
=== Ranking finals: 1 (1 title) ===
Outcome	No.	Year	Championship	Opponent in the final	Score
Winner	1.	1990	The Classic	(Australia) Warren King	10–6

=== Non-ranking finals: 3 (1 title) ===
Outcome	No.	Year	Championship	Opponent in the final	Score
Winner	1.	1992	Pontins Professional	(England) Neal Foulds	9–8
Runner-up	1.	1992	Indian Masters	(England) Steve Davis	6–9
Runner-up	2.	2004	Challenge Tour - Event 3	(England) Brian Salmon	2–6

=== Pro-am finals: 3 (1 title) ===
Outcome	No.	Year	Championship	Opponent in the final	Score
Winner	1.	1985	Warners Open	(England) David Roe	4–2
Runner-up	1.	1992	Pontins Spring Open	(Northern Ireland) Declan Hughes	2–7
Runner-up	2.	1993	Pontins Spring Open (2)	(England) Mike Hallett	6–7
