= 1990–91 snooker season =

Details
- Duration: August 1990 – May 1991
- Tournaments: 27 (8 ranking events)

Triple Crown winners
- UK Championship: (Scotland) Stephen Hendry
- Masters: (Scotland) Stephen Hendry
- World Championship: (England) John Parrott

The 1990–91 snooker season was a series of snooker tournaments played between August 1990 and May 1991. The following table outlines the results for ranking and the invitational events.

== Calendar ==
| Date (Note: Dates use the mm-dd date format.) | | | Rank | Tournament name | Venue | City | Winner | Runner-up | Score | Reference |
|---|---|---|---|---|---|---|---|---|---|---|
| 08–22 | 08–26 | HKG | NR | World Series Challenge | Hilton Hotel | Hong Kong | (Thailand) James Wattana | (England) Jimmy White | 9–3 | |
| 09–12 | 09–16 | SCO | NR | Scottish Masters | Civic Centre | Motherwell | (Scotland) Stephen Hendry | (Wales) Terry Griffiths | 10–6 | |
| 09-?? | 09-?? | BEL | NR | Belgian Masters | Sporthal Schijnpoort | Antwerp | (England) John Parrott | (England) Jimmy White | 9–6 | |
| 09-26 | 09-28 | ENG | NR | Shoot-Out | Trentham Gardens | Stoke-on-Trent | (Wales) Darren Morgan | (England) Mike Hallett | 2–1 | |
| 10–08 | 10–21 | ENG | WR | Grand Prix | Hexagon Theatre | Reading | (Scotland) Stephen Hendry | (England) Nigel Bond | 10–5 | |
| 10–29 | 11–03 | CHN | WR | Asian Open | GDTV Studios | Guangzhou | (Scotland) Stephen Hendry | (Northern Ireland) Dennis Taylor | 9–3 | |
| 11–05 | 11-11 | UAE | WR | Dubai Classic | Al Nasr Stadium | Dubai | (Scotland) Stephen Hendry | (England) Steve Davis | 9–1 | |
| 11-?? | 11-?? | EUR | NR | Norwich Union Grand Prix | Monte Carlo | Monte Carlo | (England) John Parrott | (England) Steve Davis | 4–2 | |
| 11–16 | 12–02 | ENG | WR | UK Championship | Guild Hall | Preston | (Scotland) Stephen Hendry | (England) Steve Davis | 16–15 | |
| 12–01 | 12–06 | SCO | NR | Benson & Hedges Championship | Masters Club | Glasgow | (Scotland) Alan McManus | (Thailand) James Wattana | 9–5 | |
| 12-?? | 12-?? | THA | NR | King's Cup | Channel 9 Auditorium | Bangkok | (Northern Ireland) Joe Swail | (Thailand) James Wattana | 8–4 | |
| 12–06 | 12–15 | ENG | NR | World Matchplay | Brentwood Centre | Brentwood | (England) Jimmy White | (Scotland) Stephen Hendry | 18–9 | |
| 05–16 | 12–16 | GBR | NR | Centenary Challenge | Cafe Royal | London | (Scotland) Stephen Hendry | (England) Steve Davis | 19–11 | |
| 12–17 | 12–22 | MON | NR | European Grand Masters | | Monte Carlo | (England) Martin Clark | (Wales) Ray Reardon | 4–2 | |
| 01-01 | 01–12 | ENG | WR | The Classic | Bournemouth International Centre | Bournemouth | (England) Jimmy White | (Scotland) Stephen Hendry | 10–4 | |
| 01-13 | 01-26 | ENG | NR | World Masters | National Exhibition Centre | Birmingham | (England) Jimmy White | (Malta) Tony Drago | 10–6 | |
| 01-13 | 01-26 | ENG | NR | World Masters | National Exhibition Centre | Birmingham | (England) Mike Hallett (Scotland) Stephen Hendry | (Canada) Brady Gollan (Canada) Jim Wych | 8–5 | |
| 01-13 | 01-26 | ENG | NR | World Masters | National Exhibition Centre | Birmingham | (England) Steve Davis (England) Allison Fisher | (England) Jimmy White (England) Caroline Walch | 6–3 | |
| 02–03 | 02–10 | ENG | NR | The Masters | Wembley Conference Centre | London | (Scotland) Stephen Hendry | (England) Mike Hallett | 9–8 | |
| 02–10 | 02–15 | WAL | NR | Welsh Professional Championship | Newport Centre | Newport | (Wales) Darren Morgan | (Wales) Mark Bennett | 9–3 | |
| 02–17 | 03–02 | ENG | WR | British Open | Assembly Rooms | Derby | (Scotland) Stephen Hendry | (England) Gary Wilkinson | 10–9 | |
| 03–11 | 03–16 | NLD | WR | European Open | Imax Centre | Rotterdam | (England) Tony Jones | (England) Mark Johnston-Allen | 9–7 | |
| 03-?? | 03-?? | THA | NR | Nescafe Extra Challenge | | Bangkok | (England) Joe Johnson | (Thailand) James Wattana | (Note: No play-off was held and the title was decided on league table only.) | |
| 03–21 | 03–24 | CHN | NR | Kent Cup | Yuetan Stadium | Beijing | (Northern Ireland) Joe Swail | (Scotland) Marcus Campbell | 5–0 | |
| 04–02 | 04–07 | IRL | NR | Irish Masters | Goff's | Kill | (England) Steve Davis | (England) John Parrott | 9–5 | |
| 04–20 | 05–06 | ENG | WR | World Snooker Championship | Crucible Theatre | Sheffield | (England) John Parrott | (England) Jimmy White | 18–11 | |
| 05–11 | 05–18 | WAL | NR | Pontins Professional | Pontins | Prestatyn | (England) Neal Foulds | (England) Mike Hallett | 9–6 | |
| 01-?? | 05-?? | ENG | NR | Matchroom League | | | (Scotland) Stephen Hendry | (England) Steve Davis | | |
| 10-?? | 05–20 | ENG | NR | London Masters | Café Royal | London | (England) Steve Davis | (Scotland) Stephen Hendry | 4–0 | |

WR = World ranking event
NR = Non-ranking event

== Official rankings ==
The top 16 of the world rankings, these players automatically played in the final rounds of the world ranking events and were invited for the Masters.

| No. | Ch. | Name |
|---|---|---|
| 1 | ▲ | (Scotland) Stephen Hendry |
| 2 | ▼ | (England) Steve Davis |
| 3 | ▼ | (England) John Parrott |
| 4 | Steady | (England) Jimmy White |
| 5 | ▲ | (Wales) Doug Mountjoy |
| 6 | ▼ | (Wales) Terry Griffiths |
| 7 | ▼ | (England) Mike Hallett |
| 8 | ▲ | (England) Dean Reynolds |
| 9 | ▲ | (England) Steve James |
| 10 | ▼ | (Northern Ireland) Dennis Taylor |
| 11 | ▼ | (England) Willie Thorne |
| 12 | ▲ | (England) Martin Clark |
| 13 | ▲ | (England) Neal Foulds |
| 14 | ▼ | (England) John Virgo |
| 15 | ▼ | (England) Tony Meo |
| 16 | ▲ | (Canada) Alain Robidoux |
