= Steve Duggan =

English snooker player

Personal information
- Born: 10 April 1958 (age 68) Thurnscoe

Sport
- Country: England
- Sport: Snooker
- Professional: 1983–1996
- Highest ranking: 35
- Best ranking finish: Quarter-final (x1)

Steve Duggan (born 10 April 1958) is an English former professional snooker player, who competed on the professional snooker circuit from 1983 to 1996. He reached the quarter-finals of the 1985 Matchroom Trophy.

== Biography ==
Steve Duggan was born on 10 April 1958, in Thurnscoe, England. In 1982 he won the Pontins Autumn Open tournament. He was accepted as a professional snooker player by the World Professional Billiards and Snooker Association in 1983, and finished his first season ranked 54, falling to 70th after a further year.

In the 1985 Matchroom Trophy, Duggan defeated veteran Fred Davis, Ray Reardon, Ian Black and Willie Thorne 5–4 before losing in the quarter-finals, 2–5 to Cliff Thorburn. This marked the best run of Duggan's career up to, and after, that point, and helped improve his world ranking for the 1986–87 season to 35th.

Duggan played Rex Williams in the last 32 of the 1986 International Open, losing 4–5, and Jimmy White in the last 16 at the 1987 Classic, where White defeated him 2–5. At the British Open that year, he lost 2–5 to Thorne in the last 32, and he was eliminated 3–10 by Tony Chappel in the qualifying competition for the 1987 World Snooker Championship.

The following year, Duggan progressed further in the World Championship, but was defeated 5–10 by John Virgo in the last 48. In April 1988 Duggan made a 148 in a practice frame against Mark Rowing in Doncaster.

The 1988–89 snooker season saw Duggan reach the last 32 of the 1988 International Open, Grand Prix, Canadian Masters, and UK Championship. In 1989 he made his first appearance at the Crucible Theatre, in the last 32 of the World Championship. He had defeated Fred Davis, John Spencer and Mark Rowing in the qualifying rounds. Duggan defeated Cliff Wilson 10–1, but was eliminated 3–13 by Steve Davis in the last 16.

Having finished the 1995–96 season ranked 228th, Duggan lost his professional status.
