= Duncan Campbell (snooker player) =

Scottish snooker player

Personal information
- Born: September 24, 1966 (age 60)

Sport
- Country: Scotland
- Sport: Snooker
- Professional: 1989–1994
- Highest ranking: 66 (1990/1991)
- Best ranking finish: Last 32 (x2)

Duncan Campbell (born 24 September 1966) is a Scottish former professional snooker player.

== Career ==
Born in 1966, Campbell first experienced competitive snooker in the 1986 Scottish Amateur Championship, where Steve Muir beat him 9–3 in the final. During the 1988–89 season, he entered three WPBSA main tour qualifying events, reaching the final of Event 2 of the Pro Ticket Series, where Thai prospect James Wattana defeated him 5–1, and winning his match against Gary Filtness 5–2 in the Professional Play-offs to secure his place on tour.

Campbell's first season as a professional saw early exits in the Hong Kong Open to Les Dodd and in the Asian Open to John Rea; these were followed by second-round losses in the next four ranking events. In the 1990 European Open, he overcame Pat Houlihan and Dave Gilbert to reach the last 64, but was beaten there 5–4 by John Virgo.

At the 1990 Dubai Classic, Campbell produced the best performance of his career, defeating Ken Owers, Craig Edwards and Tony Meo to reach the last 32, where he lost 3–5 to Jason Whittaker; he repeated this feat in that season's European Open, but again could progress no further, losing 2–5 to Steve James.

Campbell's ranking had improved to 66th for the 1990–91 season, but the next was poor, heralding only three wins from fourteen matches. Having lost all nine of his matches in 1992–93, he did not play professionally again; ranked 158th by that season's conclusion, Campbell was relegated from the tour in 1994.
