= Mark Rowing =

English snooker player (born 1966)

Personal information
- Born: 24 March 1966 (age 60)

Sport
- Country: England
- Sport: Snooker
- Professional: 1987-1997
- Highest ranking: 57
- Best ranking finish: Last 16 (1990 Mercantile Credit Classic)

Mark Rowing (born March 24, 1966) is a former professional snooker player from Doncaster. A winner of the 1987 English Amateur Championship title before turning professional, he reached a high end of season ranking of 57.

== Career ==
From Doncaster, he took up the sport of snooker seriously after he left school. Within five years he had won the English Amateur title, defeating Coventry's Sean Lanigan 13-11 in the final in 1987, before turning professional. After his first season as a professional he has risen inside the top-100, to number 99 in the world rankings. As a professional, Rowing reached a highest ranking of 57 in the world.

At the 1990 Classic, Rowing reached the last 16 after defeating Dean Reynolds 5-4, and Barry West 5-0, before losing to eventual winner Silvino Francisco. At the 1990 British Open, Rowing defeated former world champions Fred Davis and Ray Reardon before losing to Les Dodd in the round of 32. At the 1991 Grand Prix, Rowing led world champion Stephen Hendry 4-2 before eventually losing 5–4 in the round of 64. At the 1996 International Open, Rowing defeated Doug Mountjoy and Tony Knowles before losing to Tony Drago in the round of 32. At the end of the 1996–97 snooker season he was ranked 114th For the 1997–98 snooker season, only the top 64 players in the rankings at the end of the previous season retained full professional status. Those who finished from 65th to 192nd, including Rowing who was 92nd, had the opportunity to play in a WPBSA Qualifying School series which allowed qualifiers to regain full professional status. Rowing did not compete in the qualifying series.

Rowing won the 2009 EASB English Seniors Snooker Championship title at Sheffield's English Institute of Sport, defeating Phil Hartley in the quarter-final, and Colin Norton 6-4 in the final. Rowing reached the semi-final of the European Billiards and Snooker Association 2010 European Senior Masters, losing 5–4 to Joe Delaney.

== Career finals ==
=== Amateur finals: 2 (2 titles) ===
Outcome	No.	Year	Championship	Opponent in the final	Score
Winner	1.	1987	English Amateur Championship	(England) Sean Lannigan	13-11
Winner	2.	2009	EASB English Seniors Championship	(England) Colin Norton	6-4
