= 2000 UK Championship =

2000 Liverpool Victoria UK Championship
Tournament information
- Dates: 18 November – 3 December 2000
- Venue: Bournemouth International Centre
- City: Bournemouth
- Country: England
- Organisation: WPBSA
- Format: Ranking event
- Total prize fund: £540,000
- Winner's share: £78,000
- Highest break: Quinten Hann (AUS) (141)

Final
- Champion: John Higgins (SCO)
- Runner-up: Mark Williams (WAL)
- Score: 10–4

The 2000 UK Championship (officially the 2000 Liverpool Victoria UK Championship) was a professional ranking snooker tournament that took place at the Bournemouth International Centre in Bournemouth, England. The event started on 18 November 2000 and the televised stages were shown on BBC between 25 November and 3 December 2000. Nick Dyson made a maximum break in the qualifying stage against Robert Milkins.

John Higgins won in the final 10–4 against defending champion Mark Williams.

This was to be the last UK Championship to be held in Bournemouth, where the event was hosted since the 1998. From 2001 onwards it was hosted in York.

== Tournament summary ==
Defending champion and World Champion Mark Williams was the number 1 seed. The remaining places were allocated to players based on the world rankings.

== Prize money ==
The breakdown of prize money for this year is shown below:

- Winner: £78,000
- Runner-up: £41,000
- Semi-finalists: £20,600
- Quarter-finalists: £11,200
- Last 16: £5,800
- Last 32: £4,900
- Last 64: £3,125
- Last 96: £1,655
- Last 128: £1,150
- Highest break (televised): £5,000
- Highest break (untelevised): £1,520
- Maximum break: £20,000
- Total: £540,000

== Main draw ==
Last 48; Best of 17 frames
26	(Malta) Tony Drago	9
51	(England) Rod Lawler	7
23	(England) Nigel Bond	9
97	(England) Barry Pinches	7
18	(England) Jimmy White	6
114	(England) Nick Dyson	9
21	(Scotland) Chris Small	9
82	(England) Mark Gray	3
25	(Wales) Darren Morgan	7
58	(Northern Ireland) Gerard Greene	9
32	(Australia) Quinten Hann	9
88	(England) Adrian Gunnell	7
19	(Scotland) Graeme Dott	9
73	(England) Neal Foulds	8
24	(Scotland) Billy Snaddon	5
41	(England) Jimmy Michie	9
17	(England) Steve Davis	9
37	(England) Bradley Jones	5
30	(Northern Ireland) Terry Murphy	3
46	(Republic of Ireland) Michael Judge	9
28	(England) Brian Morgan	9
44	(England) Jonathan Birch	1
31	(England) Joe Perry	9
74	(Iceland) Kristján Helgason	6
29	(Scotland) Drew Henry	9
43	(England) Stuart Bingham	8
20	(Wales) Dominic Dale	9
59	(Northern Ireland) Patrick Wallace	3
22	(England) Mark King	9
39	(England) Dave Finbow	5
27	(Thailand) James Wattana	6
52	(England) David Gray	9

Last 32; Best of 17 frames
1	(Wales) Mark Williams	9
26	(Malta) Tony Drago	1
15	(Hong Kong) Marco Fu	9
23	(England) Nigel Bond	2
9	(Republic of Ireland) Fergal O'Brien	9
114	(England) Nick Dyson	2
6	(Wales) Matthew Stevens	9
21	(Scotland) Chris Small	5
7	(Republic of Ireland) Ken Doherty	5
58	(Northern Ireland) Gerard Greene	9
16	(Northern Ireland) Joe Swail	7
32	(Australia) Quinten Hann	9
13	(England) Dave Harold	9
19	(Scotland) Graeme Dott	7
4	(England) Ronnie O'Sullivan	9
41	(England) Jimmy Michie	2
3	(Scotland) Stephen Hendry	9
17	(England) Steve Davis	5
14	(England) Paul Hunter	6
46	(Republic of Ireland) Michael Judge	9
10	(England) John Parrott	2
28	(England) Brian Morgan	9
5	(England) Stephen Lee	9
31	(England) Joe Perry	7
8	(Scotland) Alan McManus	5
29	(Scotland) Drew Henry	9
11	(England) Anthony Hamilton	2
20	(Wales) Dominic Dale	9
12	(England) Peter Ebdon	9
22	(England) Mark King	4
2	(Scotland) John Higgins	9
52	(England) David Gray	6

Last 16; Best of 17 frames
1	(Wales) Mark Williams	9
15	(Hong Kong) Marco Fu	3
9	(Republic of Ireland) Fergal O'Brien	9
6	(Wales) Matthew Stevens	8
58	(Northern Ireland) Gerard Greene	0
32	(Australia) Quinten Hann	9
13	(England) Dave Harold	5
4	(England) Ronnie O'Sullivan	9
3	(Scotland) Stephen Hendry	9
46	(Republic of Ireland) Michael Judge	6
28	(England) Brian Morgan	7
5	(England) Stephen Lee	9
29	(Scotland) Drew Henry	9
20	(Wales) Dominic Dale	4
12	(England) Peter Ebdon	4
2	(Scotland) John Higgins	9

Quarter-finals; Best of 17 frames
1	(Wales) Mark Williams	9
9	(Republic of Ireland) Fergal O'Brien	2
32	(Australia) Quinten Hann	5
4	(England) Ronnie O'Sullivan	9
3	(Scotland) Stephen Hendry	9
5	(England) Stephen Lee	8
29	(Scotland) Drew Henry	6
2	(Scotland) John Higgins	9

Semi-finals; Best of 17 frames
1	(Wales) Mark Williams	9
4	(England) Ronnie O'Sullivan	4
3	(Scotland) Stephen Hendry	4
2	(Scotland) John Higgins	9

Final; Best of 19 frames
1	(Wales) Mark Williams	4
2	(Scotland) John Higgins	10

== Final ==
Final: Best of 19 frames. Referee: John Williams. Bournemouth International Centre, Bournemouth, England, 3 December 2000.
Mark Williams (1); Wales	4–10	John Higgins (2); Scotland
Afternoon: 17–74 (73), 0–131 (131), 73–0 (73), 32–94 (54), 0–108 (108), 47–71 (55), 0–115 (115), 117–0 (117); Evening: 0–80, 15–67, 0–105 (76), 75–13 (51), 81–8 (51), 46–76
117	Highest break	131
1	Century breaks	3
4	50+ breaks	7

== Qualifying ==
Round of 160 Best of 9 frames

(Cyprus) Mehmet Husnu 5–1 Sean Storey (England)

(Wales) Wayne Jones 5–2 Ryan Day (Wales)

(England) Mike Hallett 5–3 Lee Spick (England)

(England) Barry Pinches 5–4 Joe Jogia (England)

(England) Nick Dyson 5–0 Alan Burnett (Scotland)

(England) Darryn Walker 5–4 Jeff Cundy (England)

(England) Simon Bedford w/o–w/d Da Hailin (China)

(Thailand) Somporn Kanthawung 5–3 Stephen Maguire (Scotland)

(England) Stuart Mann 5–0 Lasse Munstermann (Germany)

(England) Richard King 5–4 Scott MacKenzie (Scotland)

(England) Barry Mapstone 5–3 Matt Wilson (England)

(Belgium) Patrick Delsemme 5–3 Neil Robertson (Australia)

(England) Graham Lee 5–4 Bob Chaperon (Canada)

(England) Anthony Bolsover 5–1 Mark Bennett (Wales)

(Republic of Ireland) Joe Delaney 5–3 Wayne Saidler (England)

(Wales) Philip Williams 5–4 Charoen Phorat (Thailand)

(England) Jason Barton 5–3 Chris Shade (England)

(England) Stefan Mazrocis 5–4 Eddie Manning (England)

(England) Craig Harrison 5–1 Craig Roper (England)

(Scotland) Hugh Abernethy 5–2 Karl Burrows (England)

(Wales) James Reynolds 5–3 Paul McPhilips (Scotland)

(England) Jason Weston 5–1 Mario Wehrmann (Netherlands)

(England) Mark Selby 5–3 Ian Brumby (England)

(Belgium) Bjorn Haneveer 5–2 Peter McCullagh (England)

(England) Stuart Reardon 5–1 Farhan Mirza (Pakistan)

(England) Barry Hawkins 5–4 Colm Gilcreest (Republic of Ireland)

(England) Andrew Higginson 5–4 Noppadon Noppachorn (Thailand)

(Finland) Robin Hull 5–3 Gareth Chilcott (Wales)

(Scotland) David McLellan 5–4 Lee Richardson (England)

(Republic of Ireland) David McDonnell 5–3 Nick Terry (England)

(England) Munraj Pal 5–1 Tony Knowles (England)

(England) Troy Shaw 5–1 Craig Butler (England)

Round of 128 Best of 9 frames

(Cyprus) Mehmet Husnu 5–3 Ali Carter (England)

(England) Leigh Griffin 5–1 Wayne Jones (Wales)

(England) Mike Hallett 5–0 Stephen O'Connor (Republic of Ireland)

(England) Barry Pinches 5–2 Mick Price (England)

(England) Nick Dyson 5–3 Robert Milkins (England)

(England) Darryn Walker 5–0 Craig MacGillivray (Scotland)

(England) Mark Gray 5–4 Simon Bedford (England)

(Thailand) Somporn Kanthawung 5–0 Steve Judd (England)

(England) Mike Dunn 5–2 Stuart Mann (England)

(England) Richard King 5–4 Dean Reynolds (England)

(England) Adrian Gunnell 5–2 Barry Mapstone (England)

(Belgium) Patrick Delsemme 5–1 Phaitoon Phonbun (Thailand)

(England) Neal Foulds 5–1 Graham Lee (England)

(England) Tony Jones 5–4 Anthony Bolsover (England)

(Pakistan) Shokat Ali 5–2 Joe Delaney (Republic of Ireland)

(Wales) Philip Williams 5–0 Leo Fernandez (Republic of Ireland)

(England) Jason Barton 5–0 Dene O'Kane (New Zealand)

(Wales) Mark Fenton 5–2 Stefan Mazrocis (England)

(England) Craig Harrison w/o–w/d Martin Clark (England)

(Northern Ireland) Jason Prince 5–2 Hugh Abernethy (Scotland)

(Wales) James Reynolds 5–1 Darren Clarke (England)

(England) Jason Weston 5–1 Tony Chappel (Wales)

(Iceland) Kristján Helgason 5–4 Mark Selby (England)

(Belgium) Bjorn Haneveer 5–3 Nick Walker (England)

(England) Stuart Reardon 5–2 Wayne Brown (England)

(England) Barry Hawkins 5–3 John Lardner (Scotland)

(England) Andrew Higginson 5–1 Willie Thorne (England)

(Finland) Robin Hull 5–2 Paul Sweeny (England)

(Scotland) David McLellan 5–2 Mark Davis (England)

(England) Nick Pearce 5–3 David McDonnell (Republic of Ireland)

(England) Karl Broughton 5–3 Munraj Pal (England)

(Scotland) Martin Dziewialtowski 5–3 Troy Shaw (England)

Round of 96 Best of 9 frames

(Cyprus) Mehmet Husnu 5–3 Ian McCulloch (England)

(England) Rod Lawler 5–4 Leigh Griffin (England)

(Scotland) Jamie Burnett 5–4 Mike Hallett (England)

(England) Barry Pinches 5–3 Lee Walker (Wales)

(England) Nick Dyson 5–1 Paul Davies (Wales)

(England) Peter Lines 5–2 Darryn Walker (England)

(England) Mark Gray 5–3 Joe Johnson (England)

(England) Alfie Burden 5–3 Somporn Kanthawung (Thailand)

(Wales) Anthony Davies 5–2 Mike Dunn (England)

(Northern Ireland) Gerard Greene 5–2 Richard King (England)

(England) Adrian Gunnell 5–4 Steve James (England)

(Belgium) Patrick Delsemme 5–4 Alain Robidoux (Canada)

(England) Neal Foulds 5–2 Gary Ponting (England)

(England) Tony Jones 5–3 Stuart Pettman (England)

(Pakistan) Shokat Ali 5–4 Michael Holt (England)

(England) Jimmy Michie 5–4 Philip Williams (Wales)

(England) Bradley Jones 5–3 Jason Barton (England)

(Wales) Mark Fenton 5–4 John Read (England)

(Republic of Ireland) Michael Judge 5–2 Craig Harrison (England)

(Northern Ireland) Jason Prince 5–1 Jason Ferguson (England)

(England) Jonathan Birch 5–2 James Reynolds (Wales)

(England) Paul Wykes 5–1 Jason Weston (England)

(Iceland) Kristján Helgason 5–3 Euan Henderson (Scotland)

(Belgium) Bjorn Haneveer 5–3 Marcus Campbell (Scotland)

(England) Stuart Bingham 5–2 Stuart Reardon (England)

(England) Barry Hawkins 5–3 Andy Hicks (England)

(England) Andrew Higginson 5–4 David Roe (England)

(Northern Ireland) Patrick Wallace 5–1 Robin Hull (Finland)

(England) Dave Finbow 5–3 David McLellan (Scotland)

(England) Nick Pearce 5–4 Matthew Couch (England)

(England) David Gray 5–2 Karl Broughton (England)

(England) Gary Wilkinson 5–2 Martin Dziewialtowski (Scotland)

Round of 64 Best of 11 frames

(England) Rod Lawler 6–5 Mehmet Husnu (Cyprus)

(England) Barry Pinches 6–4 Jamie Burnett (Scotland)

(England) Nick Dyson 6–4 Peter Lines (England)

(England) Mark Gray 6–2 Alfie Burden (England)

(Northern Ireland) Gerard Greene 6–5 Anthony Davies (Wales)

(England) Adrian Gunnell 6–4 Patrick Delsemme (Belgium)

(England) Neal Foulds 6–2 Tony Jones (England)

(England) Jimmy Michie 6–1 Shokat Ali (Pakistan)

(England) Bradley Jones 6–4 Mark Fenton (Wales)

(Republic of Ireland) Michael Judge 6–4 Jason Prince (Northern Ireland)

(England) Jonathan Birch 6–4 Paul Wykes (England)

(Iceland) Kristján Helgason 6–5 Bjorn Haneveer (Belgium)

(England) Stuart Bingham 6–2 Barry Hawkins (England)

(Northern Ireland) Patrick Wallace 6–1 Andrew Higginson (England)

(England) Dave Finbow 6–4 Nick Pearce (England)

(England) David Gray 6–2 Gary Wilkinson (England)
