= 2000 World Snooker Championship =

Professional snooker tournament

2000 Embassy World Snooker Championship
Tournament information
- Dates: 15 April – 1 May 2000
- Venue: Crucible Theatre
- City: Sheffield
- Country: England
- Organisation: WPBSA
- Format: Ranking event
- Total prize fund: £1,460,000
- Winner's share: £240,000
- Highest break: Matthew Stevens (WAL) (143)

Final
- Champion: Mark Williams (WAL)
- Runner-up: Matthew Stevens (WAL)
- Score: 18–16

The 2000 World Snooker Championship (officially the 2000 Embassy World Snooker Championship) was a professional snooker tournament that took place from 15 April to 1 May 2000 at the Crucible Theatre in Sheffield, England. It was the 24th consecutive year that the World Snooker Championship was staged at the venue. Sponsored by cigarette manufacturer Embassy, the tournament was the ninth and final ranking event of the 1999–2000 season. The winner received £240,000 from a total prize fund of £1,460,000.

The top 16 players from the snooker world rankings were seeded through to the main stage at the Crucible. They were joined by the 16 successful players from the qualifying rounds, which took place from 3 January to 20 March at the Newport Centre in Newport, Wales.

Stephen Hendry was the defending champion, having defeated Mark Williams 18–11 in the final of the 1999 World Championship to win his seventh world title. He lost his first-round match against Stuart Bingham, a qualifier who was making his debut at the Crucible. Williams defeated Matthew Stevens 18–16 in the first-ever all-Welsh world final to claim his maiden world title. The main stage of the tournament produced 54 century breaks, of which the highest was a 143 compiled by Stevens in his semi-final match against Joe Swail.

== Background ==
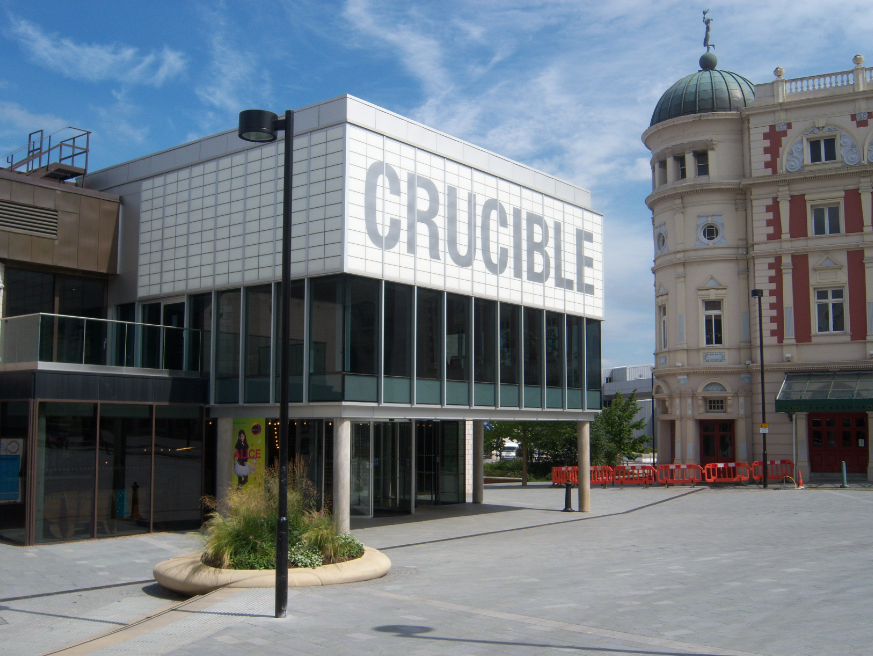
For the 24th consecutive year, the main stage of the tournament was held at the Crucible Theatre (pictured) in Sheffield, England.

The inaugural 1927 World Snooker Championship, then known as the Professional Championship of Snooker, took place at various venues in England between November 1926 and May 1927. Joe Davis won the final—held at Camkin's Hall in Birmingham from 9 to 12 May 1927—and went on to win the tournament 15 consecutive times before retiring undefeated after the 1946 edition (no tournaments were held from 1941 to 1945 because of World War II). The tournament went into abeyance after only two players contested the 1952 edition. The six editions of the World Professional Match-play Championship held between 1952 and 1957 are retroactively regarded as legitimate continuations of the World Snooker Championship, but that tournament was discontinued due to waning public interest in snooker in the post-war era. The world title was uncontested between 1958 and 1963.

Then-professional player Rex Williams was instrumental in reviving the World Snooker Championship on a challenge basis in 1964. John Pulman, winner of the 1957 World Professional Match-play Championship, defended the world title across seven challenge matches between 1964 and 1968. The World Snooker Championship reverted to an annual knockout tournament for the 1969 edition, marking the beginning of the championship's "modern era". The 1977 edition was the first staged at the Crucible Theatre in Sheffield, where it has remained since. The most successful player in the modern era was Stephen Hendry, having won the title seven times. Hendry was also the tournament's youngest winner, having captured his first title at the 1990 event, aged 21 years and 106 days. Ray Reardon became the oldest winner when he secured his sixth title at the 1978 event, aged 45 years and 203 days.

== Overview ==
The 2000 World Snooker Championship was the ninth and last ranking tournament of the 1999–2000 snooker season, held after the Scottish Open. It took place between 15 April and 1 May. It was sponsored by cigarette manufacturer Embassy. The 2000 edition marked the 24th consecutive year that the tournament was held at the Crucible and the 31st successive year that the World Championship was contested through the modern knockout format. The defending champion was Stephen Hendry, who had defeated Mark Williams 18–11 in the final of the 1999 World Championship to win his seventh world title.

=== Format ===
The top 16 players in the snooker world rankings were seeded through to the main stage at the Crucible Theatre. They faced 16 players who progressed through the qualifying rounds, which took place from 3 January to 20 March at the Newport Centre in Wales. First-round matches were played as the best of 19 frames, held over two sessions. Second-round and quarter-final matches were played as the best of 25 frames, held over three sessions. The semi-final matches were played as the best of 33 frames, held over four sessions. The final was the best of 35 frames, also held over four sessions.

=== Prize fund ===
The breakdown of prize money is shown below:

- Winner: £240,000
- Runner-up: £140,000
- Semi-final: £70,000
- Quarter-final: £35,000
- Last 16: £19,000
- Last 32: £13,000
- Last 48: £10,000
- Last 64: £6,325
- Last 96: £3,850
- Last 128: £1,050
- Qualifying stage highest break: £2,000
- Main stage highest break: £20,000
- Main stage maximum break: £147,000
- Total: £1,460,000

== Summary ==
=== Qualifying ===
The four rounds of qualifying were held between 3 January and 20 March at the Newport Centre in Newport, Wales. All the matches were played as the best of 19 frames. Stuart Bingham defeated Mehmet Husnu, Ian McCulloch, Dene O'Kane and Quinten Hann to secure his debut at the main stage of the tournament. Colm Gilcreest advanced through three rounds of qualifying, but was eliminated in the fourth and last by Billy Snaddon. Tony Drago won 10–8 over Joe Perry in the final round to book a place at the Crucible Theatre. Nigel Bond beat Euan Henderson to qualify. Both Gary Wilkinson and Joe Swail won deciding frames in their fourth-round matches, against Jason Ferguson and Stephen Maguire, respectively. The match between Wilkinson and Ferguson became the longest best-of-19-frames match ever, lasting 11 hours and 38 minutes.

John Read defeated Mark Davis, Neal Foulds and Brian Morgan to qualify. Chris Small secured a place at the Crucible by winning over Paul Davies. Kristjan Helgason recorded victories against John Lardner, Joe Johnson, Rod Lawler and Terry Murphy to become the first player from Iceland to qualify for the main stage of the World Championship. Michael Judge reached the final round of qualifying, but was eliminated by Darren Morgan. Marco Fu defeated Andy Hicks 10–3. Eddie Manning won three consecutive deciders against Troy Shaw, Jonathan Birch and Alain Robidoux, but was beaten by Graeme Dott 3–10 in the final round. Anthony Davies won over Nick Terry, Mick Price and Mark Bennett before losing to Dave Harold 7–10.

=== First round ===
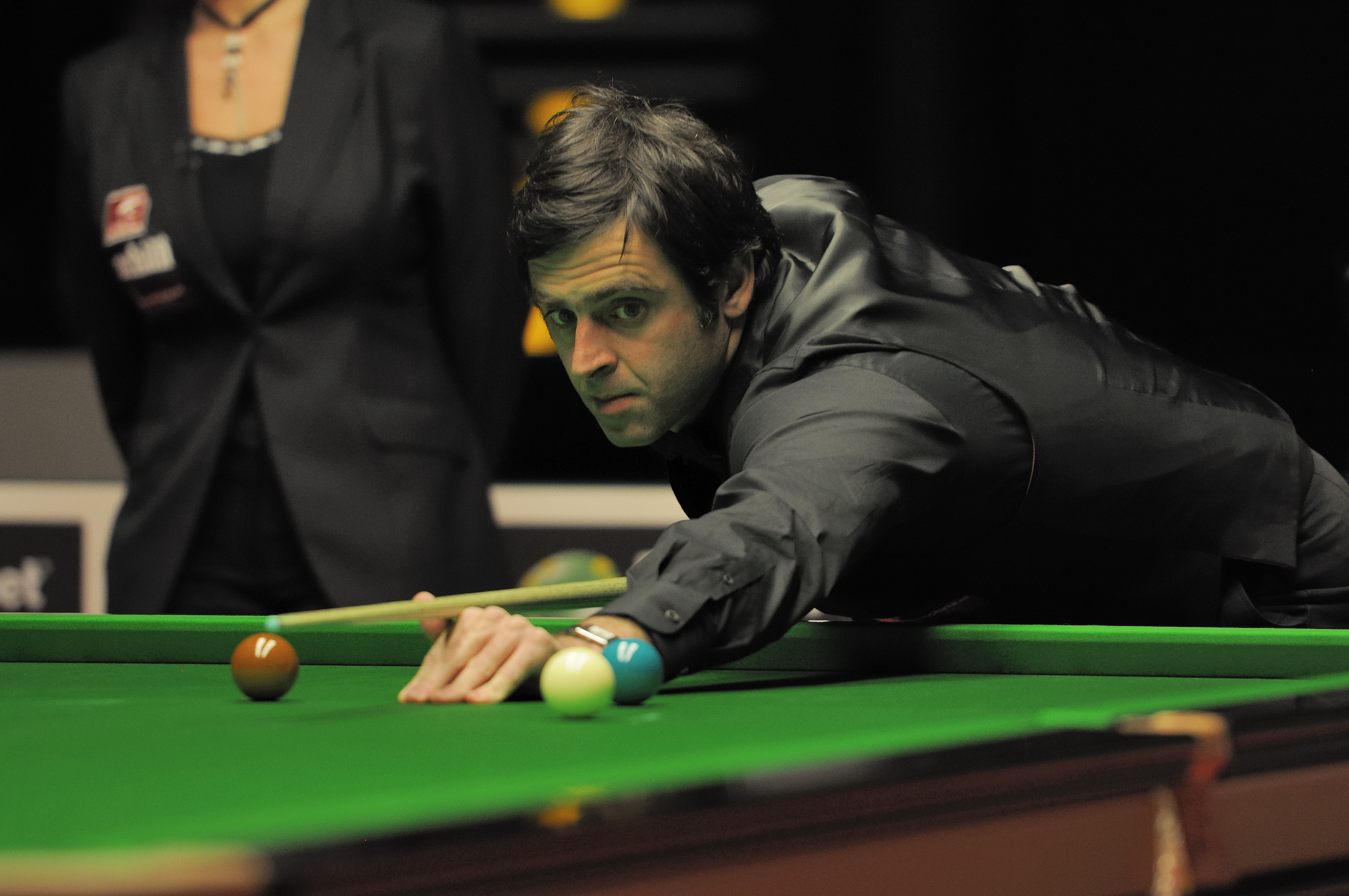
Ronnie O'Sullivan (pictured in 2012) produced five century breaks and held leads of 5–1 and 9–7 against David Gray, but lost the match in a deciding frame.

The first round was played between 15 and 20 April as the best of 19 frames held over two sessions. The defending champion, Stephen Hendry, played Bingham, who was making his debut at the Crucible. Bingham was behind at 4–5, but recovered and eliminated Hendry with a 10–7 result. "When you are negative like that from the start you are going to lose. My safety was poor, not aggressive enough and I left reds on," Hendry said. Swail faced Paul Hunter, with whom he used to practise. Swail advanced to the second round with a 10–6 victory. Drew Henry and Fergal O'Brien both progressed with 10–8 wins over Mark King and Small, respectively. The previous edition's runner-up Mark Williams had a one-frame advantage against qualifier Read at the end of the first session. Read only scored 69 points in the second session, as Williams took all six frames for a 10–4 result. "[Read] didn't play as well. He was appearing here for the first time so might have been a bit nervous," Williams said afterwards. Ronnie O'Sullivan led David Gray 5–1 and 9–7 in a match in which he compiled five century breaks. Gray took two consecutive frames to force a deciding frame, which he also won for a 10–9 victory. "When Ronnie [O'Sullivan]'s in the balls he's a genius but I knew he couldn't keep it going forever. It's a massive result. It's the best day of my career so far," Gray reflected. Dominic Dale defeated Peter Ebdon 10–6 and Anthony Hamilton advanced to the next round with a 10–4 win over Fu.

Ken Doherty, winner in 1997, had a 6–3 advantage at the end of the first session over qualifier Morgan, who had reached the semi-finals of the 1994 World Championship. Doherty made a century break as he won all the remaining frames for a 10–3 victory. "I expected a tougher match against Darren [Morgan] because he's a very good player—but I'm glad to be through," Doherty said. Matthew Stevens had a five-frame cushion going into the second session and produced further breaks of 75 and 91 for a 10–2 defeat of Drago. "The odds don't matter to me. I've got to concentrate on my game and if I continue to play like that I've got a chance," Stevens commented after the match. From 7–9 behind, John Parrott forced a decider against Wilkinson and won it. Steve Davis took the first six frames of his match with Dott and went on to win 10–6. Dott accused him of playing too slow: "I couldn't believe anyone could play so slow. [...] I think when someone plays that slow they should be pulled up for it." Stephen Lee eliminated Helgason 10–3. Alan McManus and Jimmy White both won 10–7 over Bond and Snaddon, respectively. John Higgins progressed into the second round with a 10–8 victory against Harold.

=== Second round ===
The second round was played as the best of 25 frames, held over three sessions, between 20 and 24 April. Dale had a 7–1 advantage against Gray at the conclusion of the first session and went on to win the match 13–1 with a session to spare. Dale made three century breaks in the process. He became the fourth player—after Davis and Neal Foulds in 1988 and Parrott in 1991—to get a 13–1 result in the second round of the World Championship. "I'm very pleased with my form and I don't think I have to improve an unfathomable amount to win the title. Someone will have to play well to beat me," Dale said. Williams defeated Henry 13–9. Bingham manufactured a two-frame lead against White, but White won eight consecutive frames to go 11–5. White also won frame seventeen to go one away from victory. Bingham replied by winning four on the trot, but White produced a 99 break to claim victory. "You're not just playing Jimmy [White] out there—you're playing the crowd," Bingham said. From 5–11 behind, Lee made breaks of 102 and 98 to reduce O'Brien's lead to only four frames. O'Brien sealed victory with a 13–8 result.

Parrott had a 12–8 lead against Swail, needing only one more frame to book a place in the quarter-finals. Swail took four consecutive frames to force the decider, which he also won. "I've never won a match and cried afterwards. During the last frame all I thought about was my mother, who died a couple of years ago," Swail said. Stevens, the ninth seed, defeated McManus 13–4. Doherty took four consecutive frames to build a 12–11 lead against Hamilton. The match went to a decider, which Hamilton won. "I would say it was probably the hardest victory I've ever had," Hamilton said. Higgins eliminated Davis, six-time winner of the event, with a 13–11 result. "I'm delighted to have beaten him when he was playing so well. I threw a lot of big breaks at him and kept coming back strongly. He frightened me and I wouldn't have liked to play him in the 80s," Higgins said.

=== Quarter-finals ===
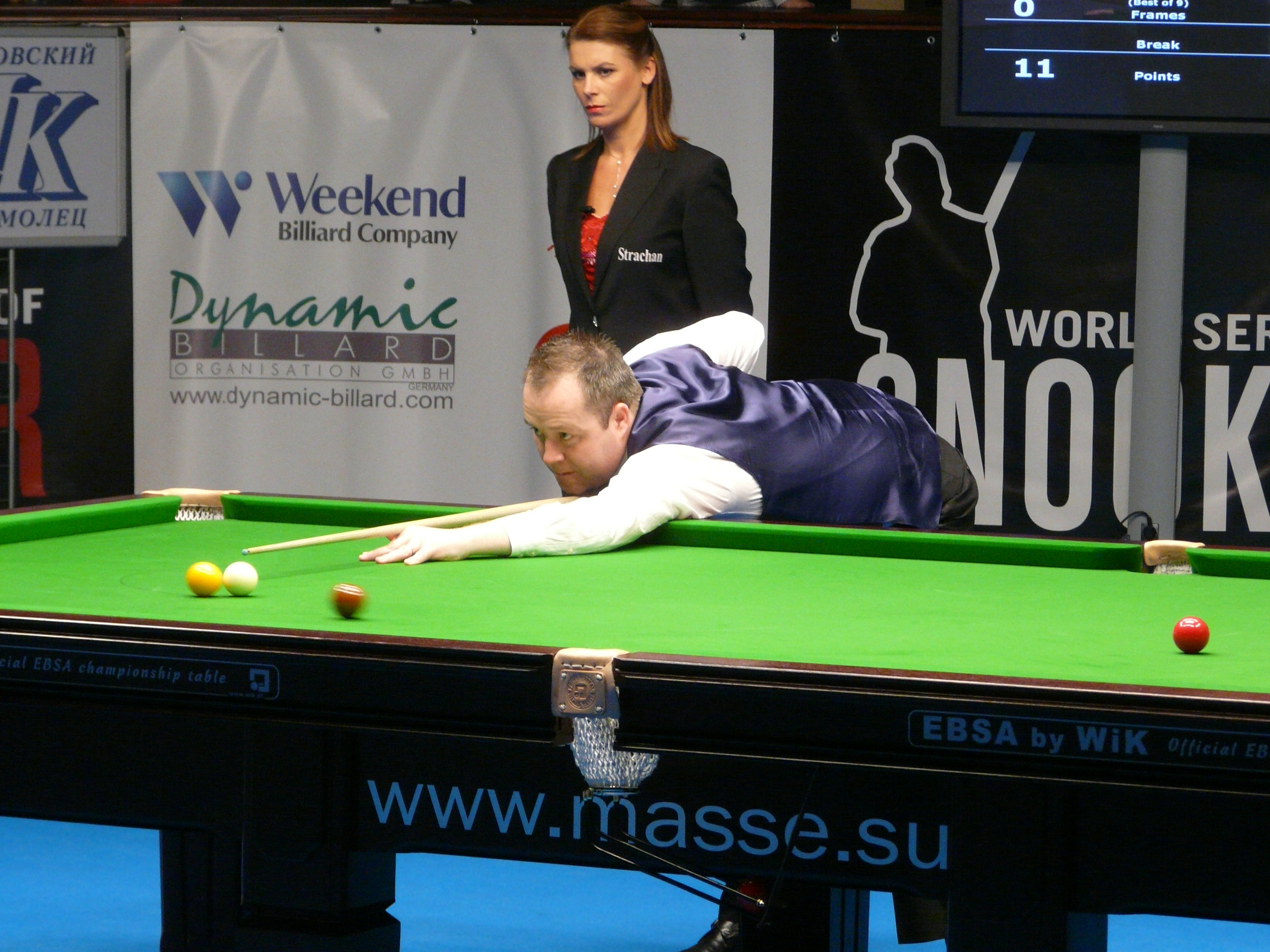
John Higgins (pictured in 2008) won eight successive frames in his quarter-final match against Anthony Hamilton, but lost to Mark Williams in the semi-finals for a second consecutive year.

The quarter-finals were played as the best of 25 frames, held over three sessions, between 25 and 26 April. Facing O'Brien, Williams won all the frames save one of the second session and built a 12–4 lead. O'Brien won the first frame on the following day, but Williams sealed victory with an 82 break. "I felt good and if I can keep playing like that I've every chance of winning the tournament," Williams said. Looking for place in the top 16 of the world rankings, Swail enjoyed a 10–6 advantage at the conclusion of the first day. Dale won the first of the third session, but Swail replied with a break of 82. Even though Dale won two in a row to reduce the arrears to three frames, Swail won 13–9. "With the top 16 spot up for grabs, I was under enormous pressure, because it basically offered me financial security. So I was hugely relieved to get the win," Swail reflected on the result years later.

Playing Hamilton, Higgins, a semi-finalist in the previous edition, won eight consecutive frames to go from 5–3 to victory at 13–3. He also recorded three century breaks in a row in the match. "Last year I cruised through every round until I came up against a brick wall in Mark Williams, who played brilliantly against me. I'm starting to hit the ball really well, and hopefully this time it will be different," Higgins said. Stevens capitalised on an 11–5 lead to defeat White 13–7. "I don't know whether I can win the championship now, but as along as I am a professional and still competing, I'll keep on trying," White said.

=== Semi-finals ===
The semi-finals were played as the best of 33 frames, held over four sessions, between 27 and 29 April. In a repeat of one of the semi-finals of the previous edition, Williams faced Higgins. Williams had prevailed in 1999. Breaks of 87, 78 and 69 by Higgins and of 66, 62, 52 and 50 by Williams meant that the first six frames of the match where shared. Higgins established a 13–8 advantage and also led 14–10. Williams manufactured breaks of 137 and 70 as he took four consecutive frames and tied the scores at 15–15. Williams won another one to move to one away from victory. Higgins then missed a pot on the green twice and allowed Williams to win the match with a 17–15 result. "I think I just held it together a bit better than John [Higgins]. You can't get more pressure than that, especially with the crowd getting into it. But I started to flow towards the end and really began to enjoy it," Williams said. "It was really disappointing. My mind just wasn't there. I had two good chances [on the green ball] and bottled it," Higgins lamented.

Swail made a 68 break to take the first frame of his semi-final match against Stevens, but Stevens then won three on the trot, including breaks of 114 and 143. Stevens led 12–6, five frames away from victory with still six to play in the session, so there was a chance that he could win the match with a session to spare. However, Swail recovered and took four of the next five frames. In the last of the day, Stevens got the two snookers he required to have the chance to force a re-spotted black, but then went in-off when playing the brown ball. Swail then reduced the deficit to two frames at 11–13. The first two frames of the afternoon session were shared, but Stevens took the next three to secure a place in the final with a 17–12 result. "I'm glad to get through, because I felt tense out there. Joe [Swail] made it very hard for me. I'm pleased with my performance under pressure and with my shot selection," Stevens said. "For some reason, I just couldn't get motivated. Maybe it's because I've never been this far. I'm not complaining—it's been a wonderful experience. It is unreal the confidence this has all given me," Swail explained.

=== Final ===
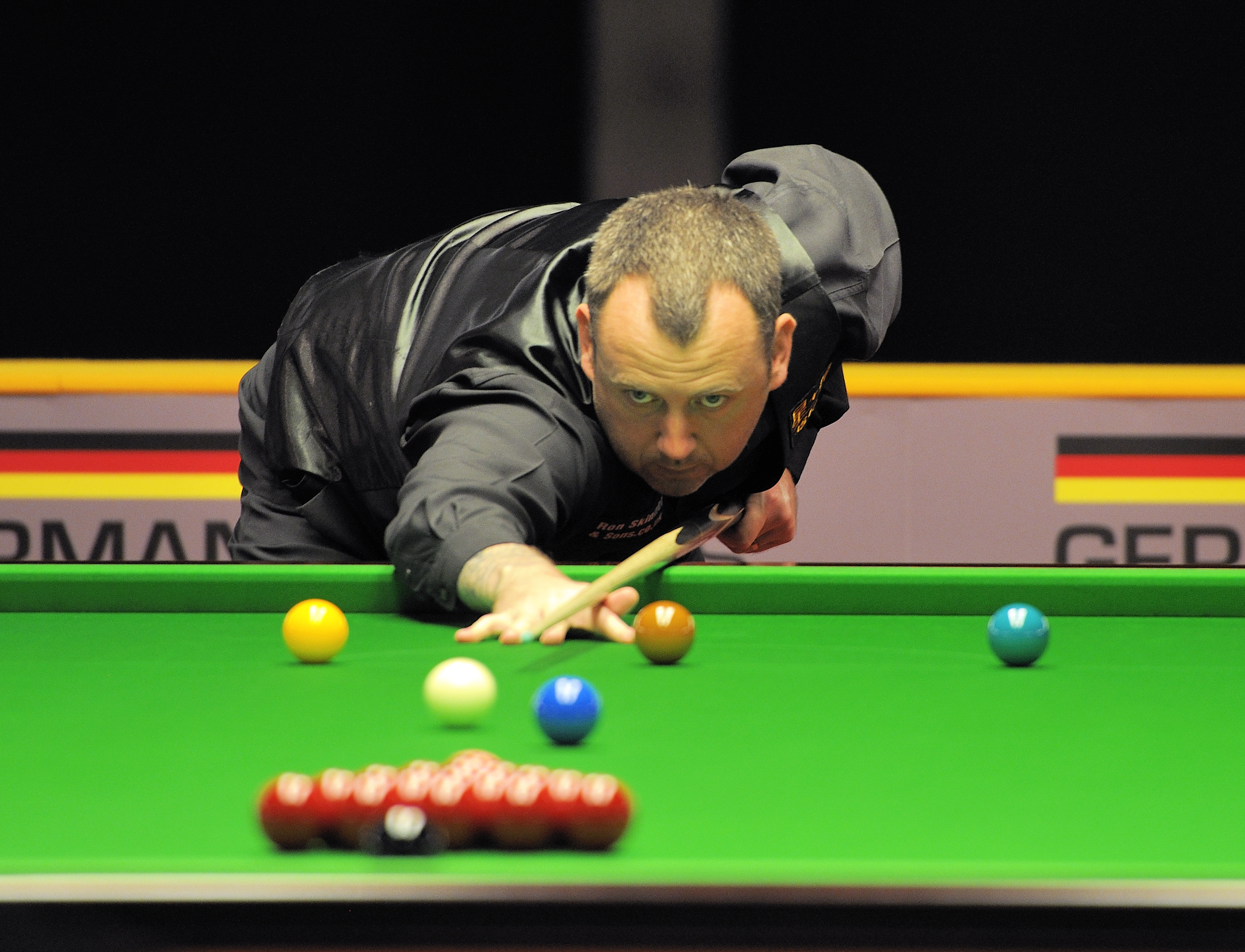
Mark Williams (pictured in 2014) defeated Matthew Stevens 18–16 to win the tournament for the first time. He became the first left-handed player to lift the trophy and the first Welsh winner since Terry Griffiths in 1979.

The final was played as the best of 35 frames, held over four sessions, on 30 April and 1 May, between Stevens and Williams. It was the first ever final between two Welsh players in the history of the World Championship. There had not been a World Champion from Wales since Terry Griffiths won the tournament in 1979. "Ever since I have been a player, it's always been my dream to walk through the curtains at the Crucible on finals day. It must be a magical feeling and I'm just glad I'm going to have the chance to experience that," Stevens said ahead of the game. John Newton officiated his first World Championship final and retired from refereeing after the match. Stevens made an 84 break as he won the first two frames of the final. He also took the fourth with a century break for a 3–1 lead. Williams then won three consecutive frames, making a 123 break in the process. A 65-point visit allowed Stevens to tie the scores at 4–4 at the end of the first session. At the resumption, Stevens won five successive frames, with consecutive breaks of 111 and 114, to put himself 9–4 in front. The first day of play ended with a four-frame advantage for Stevens at 10–6. "To be honest I feel drained, out of my head, and I'll have to try and stick in there the best I can. I don't know if what happened was down to events on Saturday against John Higgins—but if I still feel the same on Sunday I won't have much chance," Williams said at the end of the second session. Stevens, on the other hand, conceded that the advantage he enjoyed was "pleasing".

Stevens kick-started the third session, on the second day of the final, with a century break and won another frame for a 12–6 lead. The following two frames were shared. Williams won the remaining four of the session, featuring breaks of 80 and 65, to edge closer at 11–13. Williams also took the first frame of the fourth and final session aided by a 77 break. Stevens won the next with a 67 break, but then Williams won two on the trot to tie the scores at 14–14. Stevens replied with a 120 clearance in frame twenty-nine. Williams capitalised on a missed red by Stevens to win the next and then moved in front at 16–15 by winning a frame that lasted 37 minutes. Stevens tied the scores once again, but Williams won back-to-back frames to claim his maiden World Championship trophy. He was awarded £242,000 for the win. "At one point it looked like Matthew [Stevens] was going to run away with it. But I managed to keep in there and did quite well to come back," Williams said. The first left-handed player to lift the trophy, Williams climbed to the first position in the world rankings. "Everything looked good at 13–7—but Mark [Williams] played brilliantly to come back and that's why he's world number one," lamented Stevens, who added: "I was going to buy a Ferrari, but now that I've lost it will probably have to be a Mini."

== Main draw ==
The draw for the main tournament is shown below. The numbers in parentheses after the players' names denote the seedings for the 16 seeded players (1–16). The match winners are shown in bold.

**Round 1 (Last 32)**; Best of 19 frames
15 April
Stephen Hendry (SCO) (1)	7
**Stuart Bingham (ENG)**	**10**
19 & 20 April
**Jimmy White (ENG) (16)**	**10**
Billy Snaddon (SCO)	7
17 & 18 April
**Matthew Stevens (WAL) (9)**	**10**
Tony Drago (MLT)	2
19 April
**Alan McManus (SCO) (8)**	**10**
Nigel Bond (ENG)	7
18 April
**John Parrott (ENG) (5)**	**10**
Gary Wilkinson (ENG)	9
15 & 16 April
Paul Hunter (ENG) (12)	6
**Joe Swail (NIR)**	**10**
16 & 17 April
Peter Ebdon (ENG) (13)	6
**Dominic Dale (WAL)**	**10**
16 & 17 April
Ronnie O'Sullivan (ENG) (4)	9
**David Gray (ENG)**	**10**
15 & 16 April
**Mark Williams (WAL) (3)**	**10**
John Read (ENG)	4
15 & 16 April
Mark King (ENG) (14)	8
**Drew Henry (SCO)**	**10**
15 & 16 April
**Fergal O'Brien (IRL) (11)**	**10**
Chris Small (SCO)	8
18 & 19 April
**Stephen Lee (ENG) (6)**	**10**
Kristján Helgason (ISL)	3
17 & 18 April
**Ken Doherty (IRL) (7)**	**10**
Darren Morgan (WAL)	3
17 April
**Anthony Hamilton (ENG) (10)**	**10**
Marco Fu (HKG)	4
18 & 19 April
**Steve Davis (ENG) (15)**	**10**
Graeme Dott (SCO)	6
19 & 20 April
**John Higgins (SCO) (2)**	**10**
Dave Harold (ENG)	8

**Round 2 (Last 16)**; Best of 25 frames
21 & 22 April
(England) Stuart Bingham	9
**(England) Jimmy White (16)**	**13**
23 & 24 April
**(Wales) Matthew Stevens (9)**	**13**
(Scotland) Alan McManus (8)	4
22, 23 & 24 April
(England) John Parrott (5)	12
**(Northern Ireland) Joe Swail**	**13**
20 & 21 April
**(Wales) Dominic Dale**	**13**
(England) David Gray	1
20 & 21 April
**(Wales) Mark Williams (3)**	**13**
(Scotland) Drew Henry	9
21 & 22 April
**(Republic of Ireland) Fergal O'Brien (11)**	**13**
(England) Stephen Lee (6)	8
22, 23 & 24 April
(Republic of Ireland) Ken Doherty (7)	12
**(England) Anthony Hamilton (10)**	**13**
23 & 24 April
(England) Steve Davis (15)	11
**(Scotland) John Higgins (2)**	**13**

**Quarter-finals**; Best of 25 frames
25 & 26 April
(England) Jimmy White (16)	7
**(Wales) Matthew Stevens (9)**	**13**
25 & 26 April
**(Northern Ireland) Joe Swail**	**13**
(Wales) Dominic Dale	9
25 & 26 April
**(Wales) Mark Williams (3)**	**13**
(Republic of Ireland) Fergal O'Brien (11)	5
25 & 26 April
(England) Anthony Hamilton (10)	3
**(Scotland) John Higgins (2)**	**13**

**Semi-finals**; Best of 33 frames
28, 28 & 29 April
**(Wales) Matthew Stevens (9)**	**17**
(Northern Ireland) Joe Swail	12
28, 28 & 29 April
**(Wales) Mark Williams (3)**	**17**
(Scotland) John Higgins (2)	15

**Final**; Best of 35 frames
30 April & 1 May
(Wales) Matthew Stevens (9)	16
**(Wales) Mark Williams (3)**	**18**

=== Final: frame scores ===
Final: (Best of 35 frames) Crucible Theatre, Sheffield, 30 April & 1 May 2000; Referee: John Newton
Matthew Stevens (9); Wales				16–**18**			**Mark Williams** (3); Wales			
Session 1: 4–4 (4–4)
Frame	1	2	3	4	5	6	7	8	9	10
Stevens	**62**†	**84**† (77)	33	**103**† (103)	18	61	0	**75**† (65)	N/A	N/A
Williams	50	28	**56**†	23	**65**†	**76**† (57)	**123**† (123)	35	N/A	N/A
Session 2: **6**–2 (**10**–6)
Frame	1	2	3	4	5	6	7	8	9	10
Stevens	**64**†	**91**† (85)	**59**†	**117**† (111)	**114**† (114)	6	**73**† (73)	0	N/A	N/A
Williams	24	37	21	0	7	**79**†	22	**68**† (63)	N/A	N/A
Session 3: 3–**5** (**13**–11)
Frame	1	2	3	4	5	6	7	8	9	10
Stevens	**133**† (108)	**66**†	0	**55**†	0	34	46	37	N/A	N/A
Williams	0	48	**106**†	54	**81**† (80)	**79**†	**71**†	**79**† (65)	N/A	N/A
Session 4: 3–**7** (16–**18**)
Frame	1	2	3	4	5	6	7	8	9	10
Stevens	33	**67**† (67)	6	0	**120**† (120)	13	66	**60**†	8	21
Williams	**77**† (77)	0	**75**†	**74**† (67)	16	**61**†	**70**†	29	**76**† (56)	**73**†
(frame 29) 120				Highest break			**123** (frame 7)			
**5**				Century breaks			1			
**10**				50+ breaks			8			
(Wales) Mark Williams wins the 2000 World Snooker Championship † = Winner of frame

== Qualifying results ==
The qualifying matches were held between 3 January and 20 March at the Newport Centre in Newport, Wales. All the matches were played as the best of 19 frames.

Round 1 Best of 19 frames
(England) Stuart Bingham	10
(Cyprus) Mehmet Husnu	4
(New Zealand) Dene O'Kane	10
(England) Barry Mapstone	5
(Republic of Ireland) Colm Gilcreest	10
(England) Karl Burrows	0
(England) Stefan Mazrocis	10
(Scotland) Hugh Abernethy	4
(England) Ali Carter	10
(Scotland) Martin Dziewialtowski	6
(Thailand) Noppadon Noppachorn	10
(England) Sean Storey	7
(England) Tony Jones	10
(England) Wayne Saidler	4
(England) Sean Lanigan	10
(Northern Ireland) Dennis Taylor	8
(England) Willie Thorne	10
(England) Adrian Gunnell	6
(England) Tony Knowles	10
(Scotland) Chris Shade	8
(England) Karl Broughton	10
(Wales) Gareth Chilcott	8
(Scotland) Stephen Maguire	10
(England) Wayne Brown	7
(Northern Ireland) Patrick Wallace	10
(England) Matthew Street	8
(England) Stuart Pettman	10
(England) Mike Dunn	5
(England) Munraj Pal	10
(Republic of Ireland) Stephen O'Connor	8
(England) Lee Spick	10
(England) Nick Pearce	8
(England) Mark Davis	10
(Belgium) Mario Geudens	9
(Wales) Ryan Day	10
(England) Steve Judd	6
(England) Leigh Griffin	10
(England) Jason Weston	6
(Thailand) Phaitoon Phonbun	10
(Republic of Ireland) David McDonnell	6
(Scotland) Craig MacGillivray	10
(England) Lee Richardson	4
(England) Robert Milkins	10
(England) Michael Holt	8
(Iceland) Kristjan Helgason	10
(Scotland) John Lardner	2
(England) Malcolm Bilclough	10
(England) Mark Gray	9
(Republic of Ireland) Michael Judge	10
(Wales) Wayne Jones	8
(Wales) Tony Chappel	10
(England) Paul Sweeny	6
(Belgium) Patrick Delsemme	10
(Pakistan) Shokat Ali	4
(Scotland) David McLellan	10
(England) Chris Scanlon	9
(England) Eddie Manning	10
(England) Troy Shaw	9
(England) Andrew Higginson	10
(Republic of Ireland) Leo Fernandez	2
(Wales) Anthony Davies	10
(England) Nick Terry	9
(England) Mark Bennett	10
(England) Nick Dyson	1

Round 2 Best of 19 frames
(England) Stuart Bingham	10
(England) Ian McCulloch	8
(New Zealand) Dene O'Kane	10
(England) Steve James	8
(Republic of Ireland) Colm Gilcreest	10
(England) Jimmy Michie	5
(England) Stefan Mazrocis	10
(Northern Ireland) Jason Prince	5
(England) Joe Perry	10
(England) Ali Carter	5
(Thailand) Noppadon Noppachorn	10
(Scotland) Marcus Campbell	6
(Scotland) Euan Henderson	10
(England) Tony Jones	4
(England) Peter Lines	10
(England) Sean Lanigan	4
(England) Jason Ferguson	10
(England) Willie Thorne	7
(England) Dean Reynolds	10
(England) Tony Knowles	4
(England) Bradley Jones	10
(England) Karl Broughton	6
(Scotland) Stephen Maguire	10
(England) Nick Walker	4
(Northern Ireland) Patrick Wallace	10
(Northern Ireland) Gerard Greene	6
(England) Stuart Pettman	10
(England) Alfie Burden	8
(England) David Gray	10
(England) Munraj Pal	5
(England) David Roe	10
(England) Lee Spick	5
(England) John Read	10
(England) Mark Davis	4
(England) Neal Foulds	10
(Wales) Ryan Day	9
(Scotland) Drew Henry	10
(England) Leigh Griffin	6
(England) Matthew Couch	10
(Thailand) Phaitoon Phonbun	7
(Wales) Paul Davies	10
(Scotland) Craig MacGillivray	3
(England) Gary Ponting	10
(England) Robert Milkins	8
(Iceland) Kristjan Helgason	10
(England) Joe Johnson	5
(England) Rod Lawler	10
(England) Malcolm Bilclough	6
(Republic of Ireland) Michael Judge	10
(Wales) Lee Walker	9
(Wales) Tony Chappel	10
(England) Martin Clark	7
(Hong Kong) Marco Fu	10
(Belgium) Patrick Delsemme	7
(England) David Finbow	10
(Scotland) David McLellan	4
(England) Eddie Manning	10
(England) Jonathan Birch	9
(Canada) Alain Robidoux	10
(England) Andrew Higginson	5
(Wales) Anthony Davies	10
(Republic of Ireland) Mick Price	2
(England) Mark Bennett	10
(England) Paul Wykes	4

Round 3 Best of 19 frames
(England) Stuart Bingham	10
(New Zealand) Dene O'Kane	9
(Republic of Ireland) Colm Gilcreest	10
(England) Stefan Mazrocis	9
(England) Joe Perry	10
(Thailand) Noppadon Noppachorn	8
(Scotland) Euan Henderson	10
(England) Peter Lines	8
(England) Jason Ferguson	10
(England) Dean Reynolds	8
(England) Bradley Jones	4
(Scotland) Stephen Maguire	10
(Northern Ireland) Patrick Wallace	10
(England) Stuart Pettman	4
(England) David Gray	10
(England) David Roe	3
(England) John Read	10
(England) Neal Foulds	5
(Scotland) Drew Henry	10
(England) Matthew Couch	9
(Wales) Paul Davies	10
(England) Gary Ponting	4
(Iceland) Kristjan Helgason	10
(England) Rod Lawler	9
(Republic of Ireland) Michael Judge	10
(Wales) Tony Chappel	3
(Hong Kong) Marco Fu	10
(England) David Finbow	7
(England) Eddie Manning	10
(Canada) Alain Robidoux	9
(Wales) Anthony Davies	10
(England) Mark Bennett	6

Round 4 Best of 19 frames
(England) Stuart Bingham	10
(Australia) Quinten Hann	9
(Scotland) Billy Snaddon	10
(Republic of Ireland) Colm Gilcreest	6
(Malta) Tony Drago	10
(England) Joe Perry	8
(England) Nigel Bond	10
(Scotland) Euan Henderson	5
(England) Gary Wilkinson	10
(England) Jason Ferguson	9
(Northern Ireland) Joe Swail	10
(Scotland) Stephen Maguire	9
(Wales) Dominic Dale	10
(Northern Ireland) Patrick Wallace	8
(England) David Gray	10
(Thailand) James Wattana	6
(England) John Read	10
(England) Brian Morgan	7
(Scotland) Drew Henry	10
(Scotland) Jamie Burnett	3
(Scotland) Chris Small	10
(Wales) Paul Davies	6
(Iceland) Kristjan Helgason	10
(Northern Ireland) Terry Murphy	5
(Wales) Darren Morgan	10
(Republic of Ireland) Michael Judge	7
(Hong Kong) Marco Fu	10
(England) Andy Hicks	3
(Scotland) Graeme Dott	10
(England) Eddie Manning	3
(England) Dave Harold	10
(Wales) Anthony Davies	7

== Century breaks ==
A total of 54 century breaks were made during the main stage of the tournament. The highest break was a 143 made by Matthew Stevens.

- 143, 120, 114, 114, 112, 111, 110, 109, 108, 104, 103 – Matthew Stevens
- 141, 141, 137, 136, 135, 129, 127, 126, 109, 108, 108, 103 – John Higgins
- 141, 103, 102 – Joe Swail
- 136, 123, 115, 102, 101 – Ronnie O'Sullivan
- 133 – Drew Henry
- 132 – Stuart Bingham
- 126, 102 – Stephen Lee
- 123, 112, 106, 105, 101, 101 – Mark Williams
- 120, 119, 103, 101, 100 – Dominic Dale
- 118, 106, 104, 101 – Ken Doherty
- 106 – Stephen Hendry
- 102 – John Parrott
- 101 – Chris Small
- 100 – Peter Ebdon
