= Jason Ferguson (snooker player) =

English professional snooker player

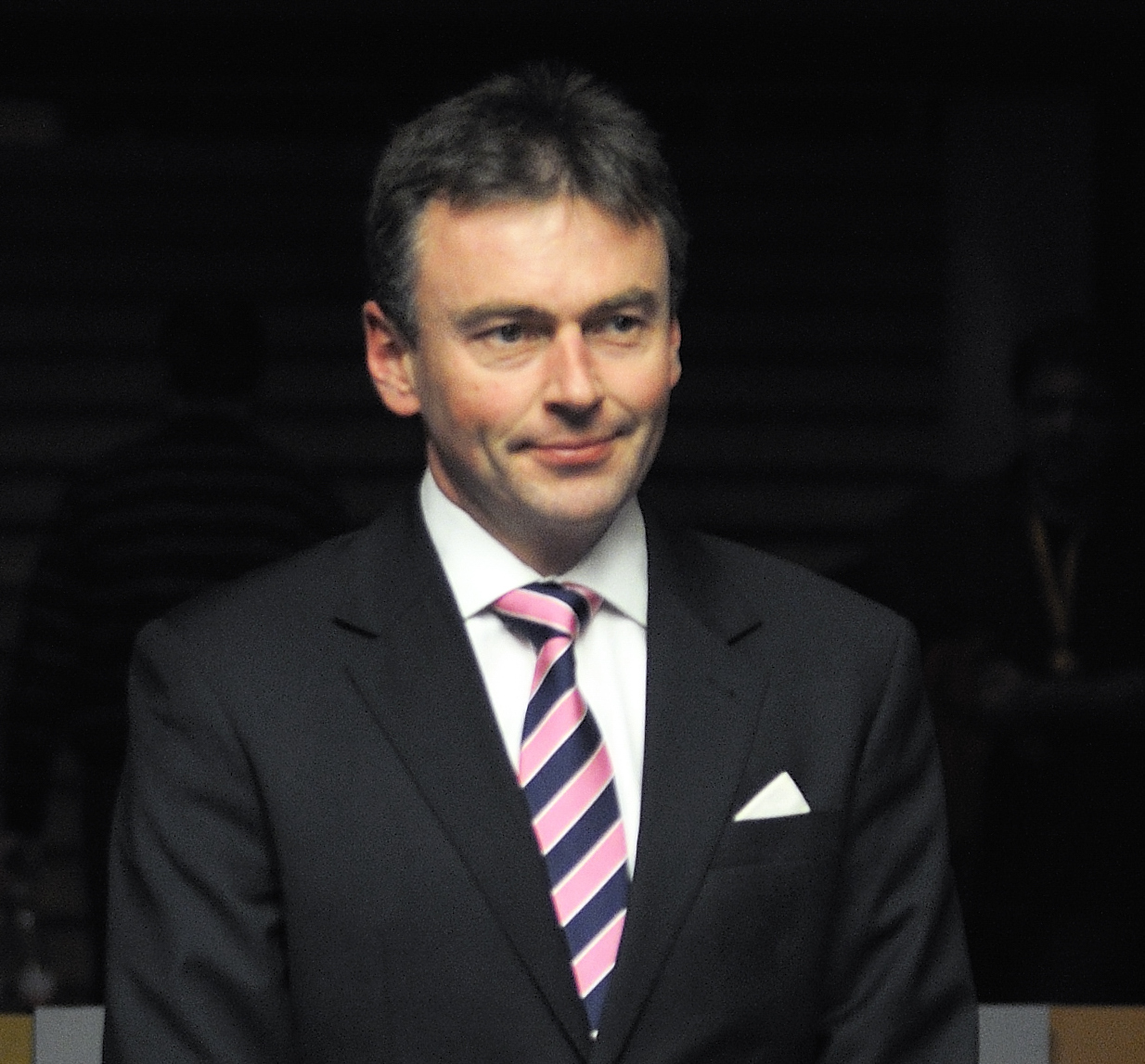
- Ferguson in 2013

Personal information
- Born: 31 May 1969 (age 57) Mansfield, Nottinghamshire, England

Sport
- Country: England
- Sport: Snooker
- Professional: 1990–2004
- Highest ranking: 28 (1994–95)
- Best ranking finish: Last 16 (x10)

Jason Elliott Ferguson (born 31 May 1969) is an English former professional snooker player and current chairman of the World Professional Billiards and Snooker Association. He reached the World Snooker Championship on three occasions, and was for four seasons ranked in the world's top 32 players, reaching a peak position of world No. 28.

In 1998 Ferguson was elected to the board of the WPBSA, and became chairman of the organisation in 2001. After retiring as a professional player and leaving his position on the WPBSA, he served as the mayor of Ollerton and Boughton between 2009 and 2010. In July 2010 Ferguson was re-elected as chairman of the WPBSA, a position he has held since. In 2022, it was confirmed that Ferguson would continue serving as chairman for at least four more years.

== Playing career ==
Ferguson turned professional in 1990. Two years later he qualified for the World Snooker Championships, losing in the first round, and reached the last 16 of the UK Championship. He reached the same stage of six more ranking events but never progressed beyond that stage.

Ferguson again qualified for the World Championship in 1996, again losing in the first round. His final World Championship appearance came in 1998, when he lost 8–10 to eventual champion John Higgins in the first round. He spent a total of four years ranked among the world's top 32 players, reaching his highest ranking of #28 in the 1994/95 season.

Although Ferguson continued to play professionally for a further six years, his form suffered due to his increased workload after being elected to the WPBSA board. He retired in 2004.

== Performance and rankings timeline ==
Tournament	1990/ 91	1991/ 92	1992/ 93	1993/ 94	1994/ 95	1995/ 96	1996/ 97	1997/ 98	1998/ 99	1999/ 00	2000/ 01	2001/ 02	2002/ 03	2003/ 04
Ranking (Note: From the 2010/2011 season it shows the ranking at the beginning of the season.)	(Note: New players on the Main Tour don't have a ranking.)	108	62	32	28	29	29	37	35	50	54	56	85	86
Ranking tournaments
LG Cup (Note: The event was also called the Grand Prix (1990/1991–2000/2001))	1R	2R	1R	2R	2R	2R	1R	1R	3R	1R	LQ	2R	LQ	LQ
British Open	LQ	1R	1R	3R	2R	2R	2R	LQ	LQ	1R	LQ	LQ	LQ	LQ
UK Championship	LQ	LQ	3R	1R	3R	2R	1R	LQ	LQ	1R	LQ	1R	LQ	LQ
Welsh Open	NH	LQ	LQ	2R	2R	1R	1R	2R	LQ	2R	LQ	LQ	LQ	LQ
European Open (Note: The event was also called the Irish Open (1998/1999))	LQ	LQ	LQ	LQ	LQ	LQ	LQ	NH	LQ	Not Held		LQ	LQ	LQ
Irish Masters	Non-Ranking Event												LQ	LQ
Players Championship (Note: The event was also called the International Open (1992/1993–1996/1997) and the Scottish Open (1997/1998–2002/2003))	Not Held		3R	3R	2R	3R	1R	1R	LQ	LQ	LQ	LQ	LQ	LQ
World Championship	LQ	1R	LQ	LQ	LQ	1R	LQ	1R	LQ	LQ	LQ	LQ	LQ	LQ
Non-ranking tournaments
The Masters	LQ	LQ	LQ	LQ	LQ	LQ	LQ	LQ	LQ	LQ	LQ	LQ	LQ	A
Former ranking tournaments
Classic	LQ	2R	Tournament Not Held											
Strachan Open (Note: The event run under different name as Strachan Challenge (1992/1993–1993/1994))	NH	1R	MR	NR	Tournament Not Held									
Dubai Classic (Note: The event run under different names as Thailand Classic (1995/1996) and Asian Classic (1996/1997))	LQ	LQ	2R	LQ	LQ	LQ	1R	Tournament Not Held						
German Open	Tournament Not Held					LQ	2R	2R	Tournament Not Held					
Malta Grand Prix	Tournament Not Held				Non-Ranking Event					LQ	NR	Not Held		
China Open (Note: The event run under different name as China International (1997/1998–1998/1999))	Tournament Not Held							NR	LQ	LQ	LQ	LQ	Not Held	
Thailand Masters (Note: The event run under different names as Asian Open (1990/1991–1992/1993) and Thailand Open (1993/1994–1996/97))	LQ	LQ	3R	LQ	1R	LQ	LQ	WR	LQ	LQ	LQ	LQ	NR	NH
Former non-ranking tournaments
Shoot-Out	2R	Tournament Not Held												

Performance Table Legend
LQ	lost in the qualifying draw	#R	lost in the early rounds of the tournament (WR = Wildcard round, RR = Round robin)	QF	lost in the quarter-finals
SF	lost in the semi–finals	F	lost in the final	W	won the tournament
DNQ	did not qualify for the tournament	A	did not participate in the tournament	WD	withdrew from the tournament
DQ	disqualified from the tournament				

NH / Not Held	event was not held.
NR / Non-Ranking Event	event is/was no longer a ranking event.
R / Ranking Event	event is/was a ranking event.
MR / Minor-Ranking Event	means an event is/was a minor-ranking event.
PA / Pro-am Event	means an event is/was a pro-am event.

== Career finals ==
=== Non-ranking finals: 2 ===
Outcome	No.	Year	Championship	Opponent in the final	Score
Runner-up	1.	1994	Merseyside Professional Championship	(England) Dean Reynolds	1–5
Runner-up	2.	1999	UK Tour - Event 4	(Wales) James Reynolds	4–6

=== Pro-am finals: 1 (1 title) ===
Outcome	No.	Year	Championship	Opponent in the final	Score
Winner	1.	1988	Pontins Autumn Open	(England) Jonathan Birch	5–2

=== Amateur finals: 1 ===
Outcome	No.	Year	Championship	Opponent in the final	Score
Runner-up	1.	1989	World Under-21 Championship	(Republic of Ireland) Ken Doherty	5–11

== Snooker administration ==
In December 1998 Ferguson was elected alongside Steve Davis and Dennis Taylor to the WPBSA's seven-person board, at the time led by Rex Williams. This appointment coincided with a period of difficulty between old and new board members. An attempt by Ferguson, Davis and Taylor to remove Williams and Bob Close in August 1999 failed, and a counter-motion saw the three voted off the board, although this was later reversed.

Ferguson became the organisation's chairman in December 2001, replacing Mark Wildman. Ferguson was at the time ranked #56 in the world. He was criticised for endorsing the board's decision to fire chief executive Jim McKenzie one week after becoming chairman.

After several years away from the post, Ferguson was re-elected as chairman of the WPBSA following a board meeting in July 2010. He survived a vote of confidence in December 2010 by a margin of 31 votes to three. In 2022, following an independent review, the WBPSA confirmed that Ferguson would continue as chairman at least until 2026.

== Other roles ==
In May 2009 Ferguson was elected as mayor of the civil parish of Ollerton and Boughton having previously spent two years from late 2006 as a town councillor in Ollerton. He was replaced as mayor by Irene Miller in May 2010.

Ferguson also owns the bicycle repair shop called Wheels ‘n’ Things. He was a non-executive director of the Sherwood Energy Village, an ecologically sustainable village on the site of a former coal mine in Ollerton; while the site still exists, the organisation went into liquidation in 2010.
