= Jonathan Birch (snooker player) =

English snooker player

Personal information
- Born: 15 February 1968 (age 58)

Sport
- Country: England
- Sport: Snooker
- Professional: 1990–2005
- Highest ranking: 42 (1998–1999)
- Best ranking finish: Quarter-final (1993 Dubai Classic)

Jonathan Birch (born 15 February 1968) is an English former professional snooker player.

== Career ==
Born in 1968, Birch turned professional in 1990, and his first season was a successful one; he reached the last 16 of several tournaments, including the 1991 World Masters, where he was defeated 4–7 by Steve Longworth.

He was unable to repeat this good form until 1993, when he reached the quarter-final of the 1993 Dubai Classic; there, he beat Mike Hallett, Dennis Taylor and Terry Griffiths en route to being whitewashed 0–5 by Stephen Hendry. Birch's performances were inconsistent, but such inconsistency was enough to warrant his position as a middle-ranked 'journeyman' player; he appeared in the last 16 at the 1997 European Open in 1996–97, where again, he lost to Hendry, this time 5–3. At the end of the next season, he reached his career-highest ranking of 42nd.

In the 1997 Benson & Hedges Championship, Birch played Mark Fenton in the last 128, compiling three century breaks in five frames as he beat the Welshman 5–4; Birch would progress to the quarter-final, where he lost 1–5 to another Welshman, Paul Davies.

He defeated a declining Steve Davis 5–2 en route to losing to Ali Carter by the same scoreline in the last 32 of the 1999 Grand Prix; Birch had made a 52 break in the final frame against Carter but lost it 59–69.

Birch maintained sufficient form to hold a position within the top 50 in the rankings until 2003, but slipped to 64th at the end of the 2003/2004 season, and after dropping a further twenty places to 84th during the next, was relegated from the tour in 2005, aged 37.

== Performance and rankings timeline ==
Tournament	1990/ 91	1991/ 92	1992/ 93	1993/ 94		1994/ 95	1995/ 96	1996/ 97	1997/ 98	1998/ 99	1999/ 00	2000/ 01	2001/ 02	2002/ 03	2003/ 04	2004/ 05	2011/ 12
Ranking (Note: It shows the ranking at the beginning of the season)	(Note: New players on the Main Tour do not have a ranking)	55	44	44		50	63	64	45	42	53	44	50	47	48	64	(Note: He was an amateur)
Ranking tournaments
UK Championship	3R	LQ	1R	1R		LQ	1R	1R	1R	1R	1R	1R	LQ	LQ	LQ	LQ	A
German Masters (Note: The event was called the German Open (1995/1996-1997/1998))	Tournament Not Held						LQ	LQ	LQ	NR	Tournament Not Held						A
Welsh Open	NH	LQ	LQ	2R		LQ	1R	LQ	LQ	LQ	1R	LQ	LQ	LQ	LQ	LQ	A
World Open (Note: The event was called the Grand Prix (1990/1991-2000/2001 and 2004/2005), and the LG Cup (2001/2002-2003/2004))	LQ	1R	1R	LQ		LQ	1R	2R	2R	LQ	2R	LQ	2R	LQ	LQ	LQ	A
Players Tour Championship Grand Final	Tournament Not Held																DNQ
China Open (Note: The event was called the China International (1997/1998-1998/1999))	Tournament Not Held								NR	1R	LQ	LQ	LQ	Not Held		LQ	A
World Championship	LQ	LQ	LQ	LQ		LQ	LQ	LQ	LQ	LQ	LQ	LQ	LQ	LQ	LQ	A	A
Non-ranking tournaments
Shoot Out	2R	Tournament Not Held															A
The Masters	LQ	LQ	LQ	LQ		A	LQ	LQ	LQ	A	A	A	A	A	A	A	A
Former ranking tournaments
Classic	2R	LQ	Tournament Not Held														
Strachan Open (Note: The event was called the Strachan Open (1991/1992) and the Strachan Challenge (1992/1993-1993/1994))	NH	3R	MR	NR		Tournament Not Held											
Asian Classic (Note: The event was called the Dubai Classic (1990/1991-1994/1995) and the Thailand Classic (1995/1996))	2R	1R	1R	QF		LQ	LQ	LQ	Tournament Not Held								
Malta Grand Prix	Tournament Not Held					Non-Ranking Event					LQ	NR	Tournament Not Held				
Thailand Masters (Note: The event was called the Asian Open (1990/1991-1992/1993) and the Thailand Open (1993/1994-1996/1997))	1R	1R	LQ	LQ		LQ	LQ	LQ	1R	LQ	LQ	LQ	LQ	NR	Not Held		
Players Championship (Note: The event was also called the International Open (1992/1993-1996/1997) and the Scottish Open (1997/1998-2002/2003))	Not Held		1R	LQ		LQ	LQ	1R	LQ	WD	1R	LQ	LQ	LQ	LQ	Not Held	
British Open	WD	LQ	LQ	LQ		2R	LQ	LQ	LQ	1R	1R	1R	2R	1R	LQ	LQ	NH
Malta Cup (Note: The event was called the European Open (1990/1991-1996/1997 and 2001/2002-2003/2004) and the Irish Open (1998/1999))	LQ	2R	LQ	LQ		LQ	LQ	2R	NH	LQ	Not Held		LQ	LQ	LQ	LQ	NH
Irish Masters	Non-Ranking Event													LQ	LQ	LQ	NH
Former non-ranking tournaments
World Masters	3R	Tournament Not Held															
Strachan Challenge	NH	R	MR	LQ	WD	Tournament Not Held											

Performance Table Legend
LQ	lost in the qualifying draw	#R	lost in the early rounds of the tournament (WR = Wildcard round, RR = Round robin)	QF	lost in the quarter-finals
SF	lost in the semi-finals	F	lost in the final	W	won the tournament
DNQ	did not qualify for the tournament	A	did not participate in the tournament	WD	withdrew from the tournament

NH / Not Held	means an event was not held.
NR / Non-Ranking Event	means an event is/was no longer a ranking event.
R / Ranking Event	means an event is/was a ranking event.
MR / Minor-Ranking Event	means an event is/was a minor-ranking event.
PA / Pro-am Event	means an event is/was a pro-am event.

== Career finals ==
=== Non-ranking finals: 1 (1 title) ===
Outcome	No.	Year	Championship	Opponent in the final	Score
Winner	1.	1993	Finnish Masters	(South Africa) Peter Francisco	6–1

=== Pro-am finals: 1 (1 title) ===
Outcome	No.	Year	Championship	Opponent in the final	Score
Winner	1.	1988	Dutch Open	(Northern Ireland) Alex Higgins	6–2

=== Amateur finals: 2 (1 title) ===
Outcome	No.	Year	Championship	Opponent in the final	Score
Winner	1.	1987	World Under-21 Championship	(England) Stefan Mazrocis	5–1
Runner-up	1.	1989	World Amateur Championship	(Republic of Ireland) Ken Doherty	2–11
