= 1992 Dubai Classic =

Dubai Classic
Tournament information
- Dates: 3–9 October 1992
- Venue: Al Nasr Stadium
- City: Dubai
- Country: United Arab Emirates
- Organisation: WPBSA
- Format: Ranking event
- Winner's share: £40,000

Final
- Champion: John Parrott (ENG)
- Runner-up: Stephen Hendry (SCO)
- Score: 9–8

The 1992 Dubai Duty Free Classic was a professional ranking snooker tournament that took place in October 1992 at the Al Nasr Stadium in Dubai, United Arab Emirates.

Defending champion John Parrott won the tournament, defeating Stephen Hendry 9–8 in the final.

== Main draw ==
Last 64; Best of 9 frames
(England) John Parrott	5
(England) Mark Davis	3
(England) Tony Knowles	5
(England) Sean Storey	2
(Northern Ireland) Dennis Taylor	5
(England) Alan Trigg	4
(England) Tony Jones	5
(Wales) Paul Davies	4
(England) Mick Price	5
(England) Martin Clark	4
(Wales) Doug Mountjoy	5
(Australia) Warren King	2
(England) Gary Wilkinson	5
(Wales) Tony Chappel	3
(Republic of Ireland) David McDonnell	5
(South Africa) Peter Francisco	2
(Scotland) Alan McManus	5
(Canada) Cliff Thorburn	1
(England) Jason Ferguson	5
(New Zealand) Dene O'Kane	4
(Canada) Jim Wych	5
(England) Mark Johnston-Allen	2
(Pakistan) Shokat Ali	5
(England) Neal Foulds	3
(Wales) Mark Bennett	5
(England) Barry West	1
(Wales) Wayne Jones	5
(England) Steve Davis	2
(England) Rod Lawler	5
(Australia) Eddie Charlton	2
(Wales) Darren Morgan	5
(England) Peter Lines	3
(Scotland) Stephen Hendry	5
(England) Anthony Hamilton	1
(England) Nick Dyson	5
(England) Joe Johnson	2
(England) Peter Ebdon	5
(Malta) Tony Drago	1
(England) Sean Lanigan	5
(England) Steve James	4
(Wales) Terry Griffiths	5
(England) Nick Terry	4
(England) Danny Fowler	5
(England) Steve Campbell	2
(England) David Finbow	5
(England) Nigel Bond	2
(Republic of Ireland) Ken Doherty	5
(England) Karl Broughton	2
(Thailand) James Wattana	5
(Scotland) Billy Snaddon	3
(England) Paul Gibson	5
(England) Dean Reynolds	3
(England) David Roe	5
(England) Andrew Cairns	4
(England) Peter Daubney	5
(Canada) Alain Robidoux	4
(England) Willie Thorne	5
(England) Jonathan Birch	4
(South Africa) Silvino Francisco	5
(England) Troy Shaw	2
(England) Jimmy White	5
(Northern Ireland) Joe Swail	4
(England) Mike Hallett	5
(India) Yasin Merchant	2

Last 32; Best of 9 frames
(England) John Parrott	5
(England) Tony Knowles	0
(Northern Ireland) Dennis Taylor	5
(England) Tony Jones	4
(England) Mick Price	5
(Wales) Doug Mountjoy	4
(England) Gary Wilkinson	5
(Republic of Ireland) David McDonnell	3
(Scotland) Alan McManus	5
(England) Jason Ferguson	3
(Canada) Jim Wych	5
(Pakistan) Shokat Ali	1
(Wales) Mark Bennett	5
(Wales) Wayne Jones	1
(England) Rod Lawler	5
(Wales) Darren Morgan	4
(Scotland) Stephen Hendry	5
(England) Nick Dyson	0
(England) Peter Ebdon	5
(England) Sean Lanigan	3
(Wales) Terry Griffiths	5
(England) Danny Fowler	1
(England) David Finbow	5
(Republic of Ireland) Ken Doherty	2
(Thailand) James Wattana	5
(England) Paul Gibson	2
(England) David Roe	5
(England) Peter Daubney	0
(England) Willie Thorne	5
(South Africa) Silvino Francisco	3
(England) Jimmy White	5
(England) Mike Hallett	2

Last 16; Best of 9 frames
(England) John Parrott	5
(Northern Ireland) Dennis Taylor	2
(England) Mick Price	5
(England) Gary Wilkinson	3
(Scotland) Alan McManus	5
(Canada) Jim Wych	3
(Wales) Mark Bennett	5
(England) Rod Lawler	2
(Scotland) Stephen Hendry	5
(England) Peter Ebdon	2
(Wales) Terry Griffiths	5
(England) David Finbow	3
(Thailand) James Wattana	5
(England) David Roe	4
(England) Willie Thorne	5
(England) Jimmy White	1

Quarter-finals; Best of 9 frames
(England) John Parrott	5
(England) Mick Price	0
(Scotland) Alan McManus	5
(Wales) Mark Bennett	1
(Scotland) Stephen Hendry	5
(Wales) Terry Griffiths	0
(Thailand) James Wattana	5
(England) Willie Thorne	2

Semi-finals; Best of 11 frames
(England) John Parrott	6
(Scotland) Alan McManus	3
(Scotland) Stephen Hendry	6
(Thailand) James Wattana	5

Final; Best of 17 frames
(England) John Parrott	9
(Scotland) Stephen Hendry	8
