= 2001 UK Championship =

Tournament information
- Dates: 3–16 December 2001
- Venue: Barbican Centre
- City: York
- Country: England
- Organisation: WPBSA
- Format: Ranking event
- Total prize fund: £600,000
- Winner's share: £100,000
- Highest break: Peter Ebdon (ENG) (143)

Final
- Champion: Ronnie O'Sullivan (ENG)
- Runner-up: Ken Doherty (IRL)
- Score: 10–1

The 2001 UK Championship was a professional ranking snooker tournament that took place at the Barbican Centre in York, England. The event started on 3 December 2001 and the televised stages were shown on BBC between 8 and 16 December 2001. This was the first UK Championship to be held in York, becoming only the fourth venue in the championship's history.

John Higgins was the defending champion, but he lost his quarter-final match against Stephen Lee. Ronnie O'Sullivan won his third UK title by defeating Ken Doherty 10–1 in the final. This was the biggest win in the final since the championship introduced the best-of-19-frame finals in 1993. The victory meant that O'Sullivan – the reigning World Champion – had now won both major ranking events in the same calendar year. Peter Ebdon compiled the highest break, a 143, in his last 32 match against Michael Judge.

== Tournament summary ==
Defending champion John Higgins was the number 1 seed with World Champion Ronnie O'Sullivan seeded 2. The remaining places were allocated to players based on the world rankings.

== Prize fund ==
The breakdown of prize money for this year is shown below:

- Winner: £100,000
- Runner-up: £54,000
- Highest break: £10,000
- Total: £600,000

== Main draw ==
Last 48; Best of 17 frames
24	(Scotland) Chris Small	7
54	(England) Robert Milkins	9
27	(England) Joe Perry	9
36	(Scotland) Jamie Burnett	3
31	(Wales) Anthony Davies	2
86	(Finland) Robin Hull	9
19	(England) Anthony Hamilton	9
88	(England) Antony Bolsover	5
21	(England) Steve Davis	9
55	(England) Stuart Pettman	6
17	(Hong Kong) Marco Fu	9
(England) Luke Fisher	1
20	(Wales) Dominic Dale	9
45	(England) Michael Holt	4
26	(Scotland) Billy Snaddon	3
35	(Northern Ireland) Terry Murphy	9
25	(Australia) Quinten Hann	2
51	(England) Nick Dyson	9
22	(England) John Parrott	9
43	(England) Bradley Jones	5
32	(Thailand) James Wattana	6
60	(England) Mark Davis	9
18	(Scotland) Drew Henry	9
78	(Canada) Alain Robidoux	1
28	(Republic of Ireland) Michael Judge	9
40	(Pakistan) Shokat Ali	1
29	(Malta) Tony Drago	9
37	(England) Gary Wilkinson	5
30	(England) David Gray	4
47	(England) David Finbow	9
23	(England) Nigel Bond	4
61	(England) Ali Carter	9

Last 32; Best of 17 frames
1	(Scotland) John Higgins	9
24	(Scotland) Chris Small	5
9	(England) Paul Hunter	9
27	(England) Joe Perry	7
13	(England) Mark King	2
86	(Finland) Robin Hull	9
8	(England) Stephen Lee	9
19	(England) Anthony Hamilton	8
6	(Wales) Matthew Stevens	9
21	(England) Steve Davis	6
11	(England) Jimmy White	9
17	(Hong Kong) Marco Fu	6
14	(Scotland) Graeme Dott	6
20	(Wales) Dominic Dale	9
4	(Republic of Ireland) Ken Doherty	9
35	(Northern Ireland) Terry Murphy	4
3	(Wales) Mark Williams	9
51	(England) Nick Dyson	6
12	(Scotland) Alan McManus	9
22	(England) John Parrott	6
10	(Northern Ireland) Joe Swail	5
60	(England) Mark Davis	9
5	(Scotland) Stephen Hendry	9
18	(Scotland) Drew Henry	7
7	(England) Peter Ebdon	9
28	(Republic of Ireland) Michael Judge	4
16	(Republic of Ireland) Fergal O'Brien	8
29	(Malta) Tony Drago	9
15	(England) Dave Harold	8
47	(England) David Finbow	9
2	(England) Ronnie O'Sullivan	9
61	(England) Ali Carter	2

Last 16; Best of 17 frames
1	(Scotland) John Higgins	9
9	(England) Paul Hunter	5
86	(Finland) Robin Hull	4
8	(England) Stephen Lee	9
6	(Wales) Matthew Stevens	9
11	(England) Jimmy White	7
20	(Wales) Dominic Dale	3
4	(Republic of Ireland) Ken Doherty	9
3	(Wales) Mark Williams	9
12	(Scotland) Alan McManus	7
60	(England) Mark Davis	2
5	(Scotland) Stephen Hendry	9
7	(England) Peter Ebdon	9
29	(Malta) Tony Drago	7
47	(England) David Finbow	0
2	(England) Ronnie O'Sullivan	8*

Quarter-finals; Best of 17 frames
1	(Scotland) John Higgins	2
8	(England) Stephen Lee	9
6	(Wales) Matthew Stevens	7
4	(Republic of Ireland) Ken Doherty	9
3	(Wales) Mark Williams	9
5	(Scotland) Stephen Hendry	8
7	(England) Peter Ebdon	8
2	(England) Ronnie O'Sullivan	9

Semi-finals; Best of 17 frames
8	(England) Stephen Lee	7
4	(Republic of Ireland) Ken Doherty	9
3	(Wales) Mark Williams	6
2	(England) Ronnie O'Sullivan	9

Final; Best of 19 frames
4	(Republic of Ireland) Ken Doherty	1
2	(England) Ronnie O'Sullivan	10

- David Finbow retires due to health problems

== Final ==
Final: Best of 19 frames. Referee: Eirian Williams. Barbican Centre, York, England, 16 December 2001.
Ken Doherty (4); Ireland	1–10	Ronnie O'Sullivan (2); England
Afternoon: 47–70, 95–0 (95), 34–92 (72), 0–106 (106), 5–93, 6–76 (72), 1–103 (62), 10–79; Evening: 1–105 (59), 12–74 (66), 8–77 (58)
95	Highest break	106
0	Century breaks	1
1	50+ breaks	7

== Century breaks ==
=== Qualifying stage centuries ===
- 145 – Darren Morgan
- 140 – Euan Henderson
- 134 – Ricky Walden
- 129, 120 – Michael Judge
- 128 – Nick Dyson
- 125, 105 – Bjorn Haneveer
- 124 – James Wattana
- 123, 111 – Luke Fisher
- 122, 109, 103, 100 – Mark Davis
- 120, 117 – Stephen Maguire
- 119 – Wayne Cooper
- 117 – Kurt Maflin
- 114 – Andrew Higginson
- 111 – Ali Carter
- 110 – Adrian Gunnell
- 110 – Bradley Jones
- 108 – Marco Fu
- 107, 101 – Robin Hull
- 106 – David Gray
- 101 – Mark Gray

=== Televised stage centuries ===
- 143, 136, 117, 112 – Peter Ebdon
- 142, 131, 130, 110, 107, 106 – Ronnie O'Sullivan
- 140 – Dominic Dale
- 137, 136, 119 – Stephen Lee
- 137, 121, 109, 107 – Mark Williams
- 137 – Fergal O'Brien
- 136 – John Higgins
- 134, 130, 127, 121 – Stephen Hendry
- 127 – Steve Davis
- 125 – Tony Drago
- 118, 114, 114 – Robin Hull
- 117, 109 – Matthew Stevens
- 117 – Graeme Dott
- 112 – Paul Hunter
- 107, 106, 104 – Ken Doherty
- 104 – Nick Dyson
- 104 – Joe Swail
- 103 – Anthony Hamilton
- 101, 100 – Mark Davis
- 101 – Marco Fu
- 101 – Terry Murphy
- 100 – John Parrott
