= 1999–2000 snooker world rankings =

No. 1: John Higgins
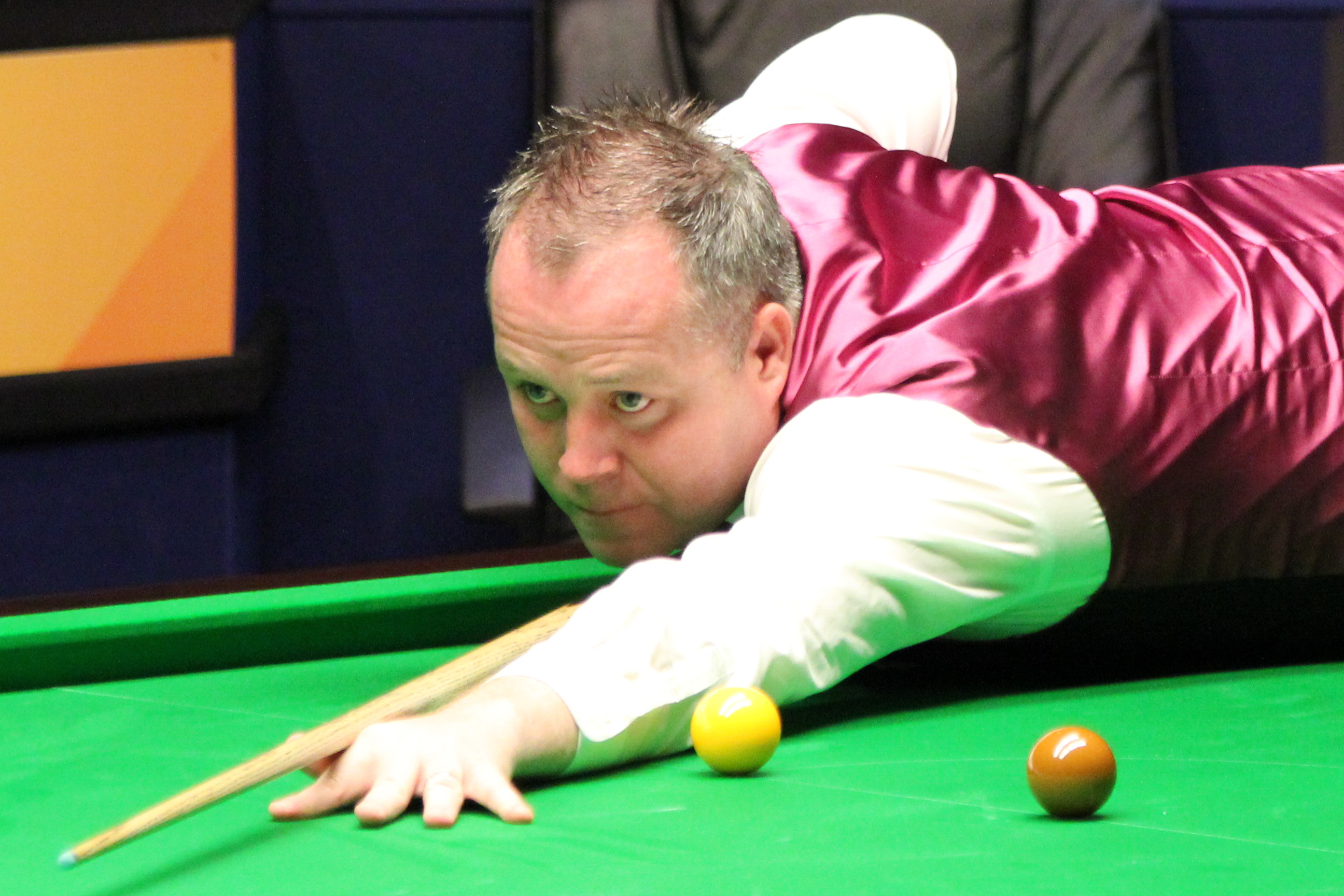

Personal information
- Born: 18 May 1975 (age 51)

Sport
- Country: Scotland
- Sport: Snooker
- Professional: 1992–present
- Highest ranking: 1

Preceded by 1998–99	1999–2000	Succeeded by 2000–01

1999–2000 snooker world rankings: The professional world rankings for the top 64 snooker players in the 1999‍–‍2000 season are listed below.

No. 2: Stephen Hendry
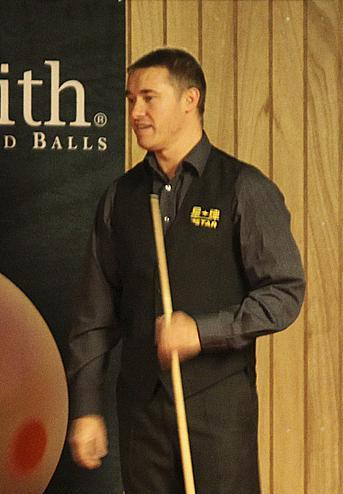

Personal information
- Born: 13 January 1969 (age 57)

Sport
- Country: Scotland
- Sport: Snooker
- Professional: 1985–2012, 2020–2024
- Highest ranking: 1

No. 3: Mark Williams
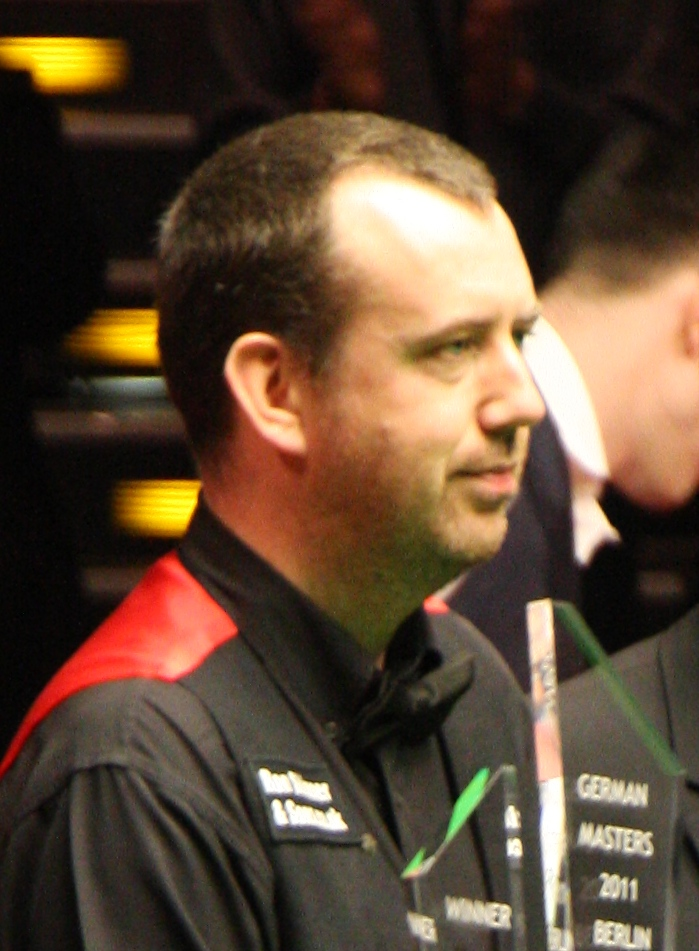

Personal information
- Born: 21 March 1975 (age 51)

Sport
- Country: Wales
- Sport: Snooker
- Professional: 1992–present
- Highest ranking: 1

No.	Name	Nationality	Points
1	John Higgins	Scotland	50590
2	Stephen Hendry	Scotland	41235
3	Mark Williams	Wales	36780
4	Ronnie O'Sullivan	England	33545
5	John Parrott	England	30000
6	Stephen Lee	England	28505
7	Ken Doherty	Ireland	28090
8	Alan McManus	Scotland	26515
9	Matthew Stevens	Wales	23380
10	Anthony Hamilton	England	23015
11	Fergal O'Brien	Ireland	22762
12	Paul Hunter	England	22137
13	Peter Ebdon	England	21810
14	Mark King	England	20420
15	Steve Davis	England	20045
16	Jimmy White	England	19822
17	Dave Harold	England	19447
18	Chris Small	Scotland	19135
19	Dominic Dale	Wales	18794
20	Tony Drago	Malta	18335
21	Nigel Bond	England	18210
22	James Wattana	Thailand	17365
23	Darren Morgan	Wales	16812
24	Billy Snaddon	Scotland	16665
25	Graeme Dott	Scotland	16615
26	Quinten Hann	Australia	16362
27	Jamie Burnett	Scotland	15637
28	Joe Swail	Northern Ireland	15577
29	Gary Wilkinson	England	15400
30	Terry Murphy	Northern Ireland	15254
31	Brian Morgan	England	15085
32	Andy Hicks	England	14397
33	Bradley Jones	England	13975
34	Joe Perry	England	13930
35	Marco Fu	Hong Kong	13654
36	Alain Robidoux	Canada	13570
37	Martin Clark	England	13515
38	Paul Davies	Wales	13407
39	Ian McCulloch	England	13132
40	Neal Foulds	England	13125
41	Gerard Greene	Northern Ireland	13119
42	Peter Lines	England	12942
43	Euan Henderson	Scotland	12697
44	Steve James	England	12602
45	Drew Henry	Scotland	12575
46	Lee Walker	Wales	12142
47	Matthew Couch	England	12060
48	Marcus Campbell	Scotland	12005
49	Gary Ponting	England	11970
50	Jason Ferguson	England	11892
51	Rod Lawler	England	11875
52	David Finbow	England	11542
53	Jonathan Birch	England	11447
54	Nick Walker	England	11320
55	Dean Reynolds	England	11302
56	Paul Wykes	England	11277
57	Mick Price	England	11090
58	David Roe	England	11060
59	Joe Johnson	England	11020
60	David Gray	England	10957
61	Alfie Burden	England	10812
62	John Read	England	10497
63	Jimmy Michie	England	10482
64	Jason Prince	Northern Ireland	10402
65	Tony Jones	England	10345
66	Nick Pearce	England	10295
67	Michael Judge	Ireland	10257
68	Stuart Pettman	England	10210
69	Shokat Ali	Pakistan	10172
70	Chris Scanlon	England	10057
71	Karl Broughton	England	9907
72	John Lardner	Scotland	9497
73	Leigh Griffin	England	9430
74	Michael Holt	England	9377
75	Willie Thorne	England	9342
76	Tony Chappel	Wales	9342
77	Dene O'Kane	New Zealand	9292
78	Mark Davis	England	9252
79	Mark Gray	England	9242
80	Anthony Davies	Wales	9225
81	Leo Fernandez	Ireland	9099
82	Martin Dziewialtowski	Scotland	9057
83	Wayne Brown	England	9010
84	Patrick Wallace	Northern Ireland	9002
85	Stephen O'Connor	Ireland	8867
86	Steve Judd	England	8690
87	Sean Storey	England	8642
88	Dennis Taylor	Northern Ireland	8637
89	Craig MacGillivray	Scotland	8607
90	Darren Clarke	England	8462
91	Karl Burrows	England	8435
92	Stefan Mazrocis	England	8360
93	Stuart Bingham	England	8237
94	Tony Knowles	England	8157
95	Phaitoon Phonbun	Thailand	8097
96	Troy Shaw	England	8027
97	Mark Bennett	Wales	8027
98	Mario Geudens	Belgium	7942
99	Ross Hart	Scotland	7912
100	Robert Milkins	England	7902
101	Robin Hull	Finland	7882
102	Peter McCullagh	England	7712
103	Ian Brumby	England	7647
104	Wayne Jones	Wales	7647
105	Kristján Helgason	Iceland	7637
106	Adrian Gunnell	England	7562
142	Ali Carter	England	
193	Stephen Maguire	Scotland	
195	Barry Hawkins	England	
