= David Finbow =

English snooker player

Personal information
- Born: 27 February 1968 (age 58) Worcester, England

Sport
- Country: England
- Sport: Snooker
- Professional: 1991–2005
- Highest ranking: 28 (1996/1997)
- Best ranking finish: Quarter-final (x4)

David Finbow (born 27 February 1968) is an English former professional snooker player from Worcester.

== Career ==
In his career, he managed to beat players such as Ronnie O'Sullivan, Ken Doherty and James Wattana. Originally a soccer player, he was introduced to snooker by a neighbourhood friend. He attended Jarvis Collegiate Institute in Toronto for high school, where he became a star in his new sport for the Bulldogs, who began dominating the Toronto league in 1978. Throughout his career he reached five quarter-finals in ranking tournaments, as well as the last 16 of many events and he once looked as if he could get into the top 16 of the world rankings. However, his results in tournaments suffered, which was partly due to suffering from anxiety attacks which caused him to feel nauseated and unable to concentrate in a match. Finbow could not find a cure, and despite taking prescribed medication and trying a number of solutions it did not cure his anxiety attacks completely. After beating David Gray and Dave Harold to reach the last 16 of the 2001 UK Championship he was playing Ronnie O'Sullivan, but suffered a particularly bad anxiety attack, and was forced to retire the match at 0–8 down. After the match he expressed his distress and by the end of the 2002–2003 season he announced his retirement from the game altogether.

== Performance and rankings timeline ==
Tournament	1990/ 91	1991/ 92	1992/ 93	1993/ 94		1994/ 95	1995/ 96	1996/ 97	1997/ 98	1998/ 99	1999/ 00	2000/ 01	2001/ 02	2002/ 03	2003/ 04	2004/ 05	2019/ 20
Ranking (Note: From the 2010/2011 season it shows the ranking at the beginning of the season.)	(Note: He was an amateur.)	(Note: New players on the Main Tour do not have a ranking.)	63	63		41	47	28	39	68	52	39	47	49	52	60	
Ranking tournaments
World Open (Note: The event was called the Grand Prix (1990/1991–2000/2001, 2004/2005–2008/2009) and the LG Cup (2001/2002–2003/2004))	A	QF	LQ	LQ		LQ	2R	1R	LQ	LQ	2R	LQ	LQ	1R	LQ	LQ	A
UK Championship	A	LQ	LQ	LQ		LQ	1R	1R	LQ	LQ	LQ	1R	3R	LQ	LQ	LQ	A
Scottish Open (Note: The event was called the International Open (1992/1993-1996/1997) and the Players Championship (2003/2004))	Not Held		LQ	1R		1R	QF	2R	1R	1R	1R	LQ	1R	LQ	WD	NH	A
European Masters (Note: The event was called the European Open (1990/1991-1996/1997 and 2001/2002-2003/2004), the Irish Open (1998/1999) and the Malta Cup (2004/2005))	A	LQ	LQ	LQ		LQ	2R	LQ	NH	LQ	Not Held		LQ	2R	LQ	A	A
German Masters (Note: The event was called the German Open (1995/1996-1997/1998))	Tournament Not Held						1R	1R	LQ	NR	Tournament Not Held						A
World Grand Prix	Tournament Not Held																DNQ
Welsh Open	A	LQ	1R	2R		LQ	LQ	1R	1R	1R	LQ	LQ	LQ	LQ	LQ	A	A
Players Championship	Tournament Not Held																DNQ
Gibraltar Open	Tournament Not Held																LQ
Tour Championship	Tournament Not Held																DNQ
World Championship	A	LQ	LQ	LQ		LQ	LQ	LQ	LQ	LQ	LQ	LQ	LQ	LQ	LQ	A	A
Non-ranking tournaments
The Masters	A	LQ	LQ	A		A	LQ	A	LQ	LQ	LQ	LQ	LQ	A	A	A	A
Former ranking tournaments
Classic	A	LQ	Tournament Not Held														
Strachan Open	NH	LQ	MR	Tournament Not Held													
Asian Classic (Note: The event was called the Dubai Classic (1990/1991-1994/1995) and the Thailand Classic (1995/1996))	A	LQ	3R	1R		1R	QF	LQ	Tournament Not Held								
Malta Grand Prix	Tournament Not Held					Non-Ranking Event					LQ	NR	Tournament Not Held				
Thailand Masters (Note: The event was called the Asian Open (1990/1991-1992/1993) and the Thailand Open (1993/1994-1996/1997))	A	LQ	1R	WR		LQ	LQ	LQ	LQ	1R	LQ	QF	1R	NR	Tournament Not Held		
British Open	A	LQ	2R	LQ		1R	LQ	1R	1R	2R	1R	LQ	LQ	LQ	LQ	A	NH
Irish Masters	Non-Ranking Event													LQ	LQ	A	NH
China Open (Note: The event was called the China International (1997/1998-1998/1999))	Tournament Not Held								NR	1R	LQ	LQ	LQ	Not Held		A	NH
Former non-ranking tournaments
World Masters	1R	Tournament Not Held															
Strachan Open	NH	R	MR	2R	LQ	Tournament Not Held											

Performance table legend
LQ	lost in the qualifying draw	#R	lost in the early rounds of the tournament (WR = Wildcard round, RR = Round robin)	QF	lost in the quarter-finals
SF	lost in the semi–finals	F	lost in the final	W	won the tournament
DNQ	did not qualify for the tournament	A	did not participate in the tournament	WD	withdrew from the tournament

NH / Not Held	means an event was not held.
NR / Non-Ranking Event	means an event is/was no longer a ranking event.
R / Ranking Event	means an event is/was a ranking event.
MR / Minor-Ranking Event	means an event is/was a minor-ranking event.
