= Merseyside Professional Championship =

Tournament information
- Venue: Liverpool Billiards & Snooker Club; George Scott Snooker Club
- Location: Liverpool
- Country: England
- Established: 1993
- Organisation(s): Liverpool Billiards and Snooker
- Format: Non-ranking event
- Final year: 2004
- Final champion: (England) Joe Perry

The Merseyside Professional Championship was a professional non-ranking snooker tournament held in England that ran from 1993 to 2004. The final champion was Joe Perry.

== History ==
The tournament was a highly successful low-budget professional event promoted by referee Peter Williamson. Although the prize money was modest, it attracted a large field mainly drawn from the lower end of the ranking list.

== Winners ==
Year	Winner	Runner-up	Final score	Season
1993	(England) Dave Harold	(England) Tony Rampello	5–3	1993/1994
1994	(England) Dean Reynolds	(England) Jason Ferguson	5–1	1994/1995
1995	(England) Rod Lawler	(England) Dean Reynolds	5–4	1995/1996
1996	(England) David Gray	(England) Paul Sweeny	5–2	1996/1997
1997	(England) Antony Bolsover	(England) Paul Wykes	5–4	1997/1998
1998	(England) Peter Lines	(Wales) Lee Walker	5–4	1998/1999
1999	(England) Stuart Bingham	(England) Stuart Pettman	5–1	1999/2000
2000	(England) Michael Holt	(England) Rod Lawler	5–3	2000/2001
2001	(England) Nick Dyson	(England) Paul Davison	5–2	2001/2002
2002	(England) Mark Davis	(Scotland) Stephen Maguire	5–2	2002/2003
2003	(Scotland) Stephen Maguire	(England) Mark Davis	5–1	2003/2004
2004	(England) Joe Perry	(England) Stephen Croft	5–2	2004/2005
