= 1991 Grand Prix (snooker) =

Rothmans Grand Prix
Tournament information
- Dates: 14–27 October 1991
- Venue: Hexagon Theatre
- City: Reading
- Country: England
- Organisation: WPBSA
- Format: Ranking event
- Total prize fund: £399,300
- Winner's share: £75,000
- Highest break: Steve Davis (ENG) (131)

Final
- Champion: Stephen Hendry (SCO)
- Runner-up: Steve Davis (ENG)
- Score: 10–6

The 1991 Rothmans Grand Prix was a professional snooker tournament and the second of ten WPBSA ranking events in the 1991/1992 season, following the Dubai Classic and preceding the UK Championship. It was held from 14 to 27 October 1991 at the Hexagon Theatre in Reading, England.

Stephen Hendry successfully defended the title by defeating Steve Davis 10–6 in the final. This was Hendry's third Grand Prix and his 12th ranking title overall.

== Tournament summary ==
Defending champion Stephen Hendry was the number 1 seed with World Champion John Parrott seeded 2. The remaining places were allocated to players based on the world rankings.

== Main draw ==
Last 64; Best of 9 frames
1	(Scotland) Stephen Hendry	5
(England) Mark Rowing	4
27	(Australia) Eddie Charlton	3
(England) Dave Harold	5
24	(South Africa) Silvino Francisco	5
(England) Steve Duggan	3
12	(England) Dean Reynolds	5
(Malaysia) Sam Chong	2
11	(Wales) Terry Griffiths	5
(England) Andrew Cairns	2
25	(Wales) Wayne Jones	2
(England) Jason Ferguson	5
31	(England) John Virgo	3
(Northern Ireland) Jason Prince	5
7	(England) Steve James	5
(England) Robert Marshall	0
6	(England) Neal Foulds	5
(Scotland) Craig MacGillivray	2
17	(England) Willie Thorne	5
(Malta) Joe Grech	4
22	(Malta) Tony Drago	0
51	(Republic of Ireland) Ken Doherty	5
9	(Northern Ireland) Dennis Taylor	4
41	(Scotland) Alan McManus	5
14	(England) Martin Clark	4
(England) Barry West	5
18	(New Zealand) Dene O'Kane	5
(England) Malcolm Bradley	4
23	(Wales) Steve Newbury	0
(Republic of Ireland) Eugene Hughes	5
4	(England) Jimmy White	4
(England) Ian Graham	5
3	(England) Steve Davis	5
(England) Jon Wright	0
19	(South Africa) Peter Francisco	0
(England) Jim Chambers	5
30	(Canada) Bob Chaperon	1
(England) Peter Daubney	5
13	(Canada) Alain Robidoux	5
(Hong Kong) Franky Chan	2
10	(Wales) Doug Mountjoy	5
34	(England) Tony Meo	4
20	(Thailand) James Wattana	4
(England) David Finbow	5
29	(Wales) Mark Bennett	5
(England) Jonathan Birch	4
5	(England) Gary Wilkinson	5
36	(Canada) Cliff Thorburn	1
8	(England) Mike Hallett	5
33	(Wales) Darren Morgan	2
32	(Wales) Cliff Wilson	5
(England) Les Dodd	3
26	(England) Joe Johnson	5
(Australia) Warren King	2
15	(England) Tony Jones	5
(England) Mick Price	2
16	(England) Tony Knowles	3
(England) Peter Ebdon	5
28	(England) Danny Fowler	1
(Wales) Paul Davies	5
21	(England) Nigel Bond	5
(England) David Taylor	1
2	(England) John Parrott	4
(England) Brian Morgan	5

Last 32; Best of 9 frames
1	(Scotland) Stephen Hendry	5
(England) Dave Harold	0
24	(South Africa) Silvino Francisco	5
12	(England) Dean Reynolds	2
11	(Wales) Terry Griffiths	5
(England) Jason Ferguson	4
(Northern Ireland) Jason Prince	2
7	(England) Steve James	5
6	(England) Neal Foulds	5
17	(England) Willie Thorne	2
51	(Republic of Ireland) Ken Doherty	2
41	(Scotland) Alan McManus	5
(England) Barry West	1
18	(New Zealand) Dene O'Kane	5
(Republic of Ireland) Eugene Hughes	3
(England) Ian Graham	5
3	(England) Steve Davis	5
(England) Jim Chambers	1
(England) Peter Daubney	1
13	(Canada) Alain Robidoux	5
10	(Wales) Doug Mountjoy	2
(England) David Finbow	5
29	(Wales) Mark Bennett	5
5	(England) Gary Wilkinson	3
8	(England) Mike Hallett	5
32	(Wales) Cliff Wilson	3
26	(England) Joe Johnson	5
15	(England) Tony Jones	4
(England) Peter Ebdon	5
(Wales) Paul Davies	4
21	(England) Nigel Bond	5
(England) Brian Morgan	4

Last 16; Best of 9 frames
1	(Scotland) Stephen Hendry	5
24	(South Africa) Silvino Francisco	1
11	(Wales) Terry Griffiths	5
7	(England) Steve James	2
6	(England) Neal Foulds	4
41	(Scotland) Alan McManus	5
18	(New Zealand) Dene O'Kane	3
(England) Ian Graham	5
3	(England) Steve Davis	5
13	(Canada) Alain Robidoux	2
(England) David Finbow	5
29	(Wales) Mark Bennett	4
8	(England) Mike Hallett	2
26	(England) Joe Johnson	5
(England) Peter Ebdon	4
21	(England) Nigel Bond	5

Quarter-finals; Best of 9 frames
1	(Scotland) Stephen Hendry	5
11	(Wales) Terry Griffiths	3
41	(Scotland) Alan McManus	5
(England) Ian Graham	1
3	(England) Steve Davis	5
(England) David Finbow	2
26	(England) Joe Johnson	2
21	(England) Nigel Bond	5

Semi-finals; Best of 17 frames
1	(Scotland) Stephen Hendry	9
41	(Scotland) Alan McManus	4
3	(England) Steve Davis	9
21	(England) Nigel Bond	1

Final; Best of 19 frames
1	(Scotland) Stephen Hendry	10
3	(England) Steve Davis	6

== Final ==
Final: Best of 19 frames. Referee: John Williams . Hexagon Theatre, Reading, England, 27 October 1991.
Stephen Hendry (1); Scotland	10–6	Steve Davis (3); England
Afternoon: 50–75 (67), 83–23 (83), 85–0 (68), 76–30 (75), 70–56, 123–14 (119), 93–23 (53), 85–46 (85); Evening: 40–60, 0–94 (94), 38–72 (65), 75–51, 35–106 (59), 61–71 (Hendry 60, Davis 71), 76–34 (56), 119–16 (101)
119	Highest break	94
2	Century breaks	0
8	50+ breaks	5

== Century breaks ==
- 136 – Ken Owers
- 131, 100 – Drew Henry
- 131 – Steve Davis
- 129 – Lee Grant
- 128, 106 – Bjorn L'Orange
- 125 – Craig MacGillivray
- 121 – Jason Ferguson
- 119, 101, 101 – Stephen Hendry
- 118 – Alex Borg
- 114 – John Timson
- 113 – Chris Palmer
- 112, 106 – Peter Ebdon
- 111 – Ken Doherty
- 111 – Nick Walker
- 110 – Amrik Cheema
- 109 – Mark Flowerdew
- 108 – Nick Fruin
- 108 – James Wattana
- 106 – Terry Murphy
- 105 – Barry Bunn
- 105 – Dene O'Kane
- 105 – Dean Venables
- 103 – David Finbow
- 102 – Colin Morton
- 101 – Fergal O'Brien
- 100 – Peter Lines
- 100 – Anthony O'Connor
- 100 – Jimmy White
- 100 – Gary Wilkinson
