= 2000–01 snooker world rankings =

No. 1: Mark Williams
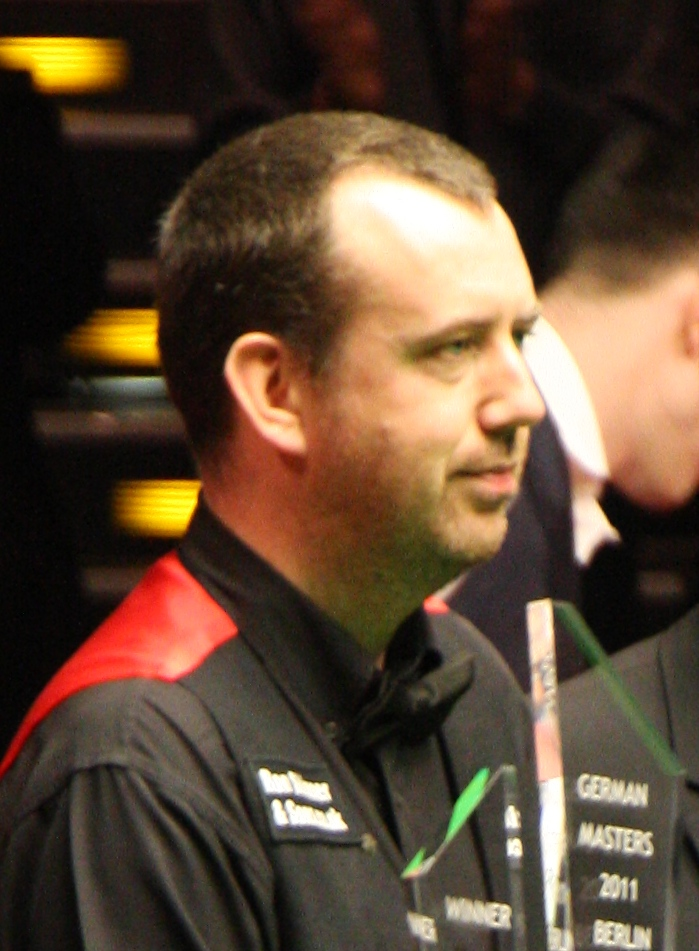

Personal information
- Born: March 21, 1975 (age 51)

Sport
- Country: Wales
- Sport: Snooker
- Professional: 1992–present
- Highest ranking: 1

Preceded by 1999–2000	2000–01	Succeeded by 2001–02

2000–01 snooker world rankings: The professional world rankings for the top 64 snooker players in the 2000‍–‍01 season are listed below.

No. 2: John Higgins
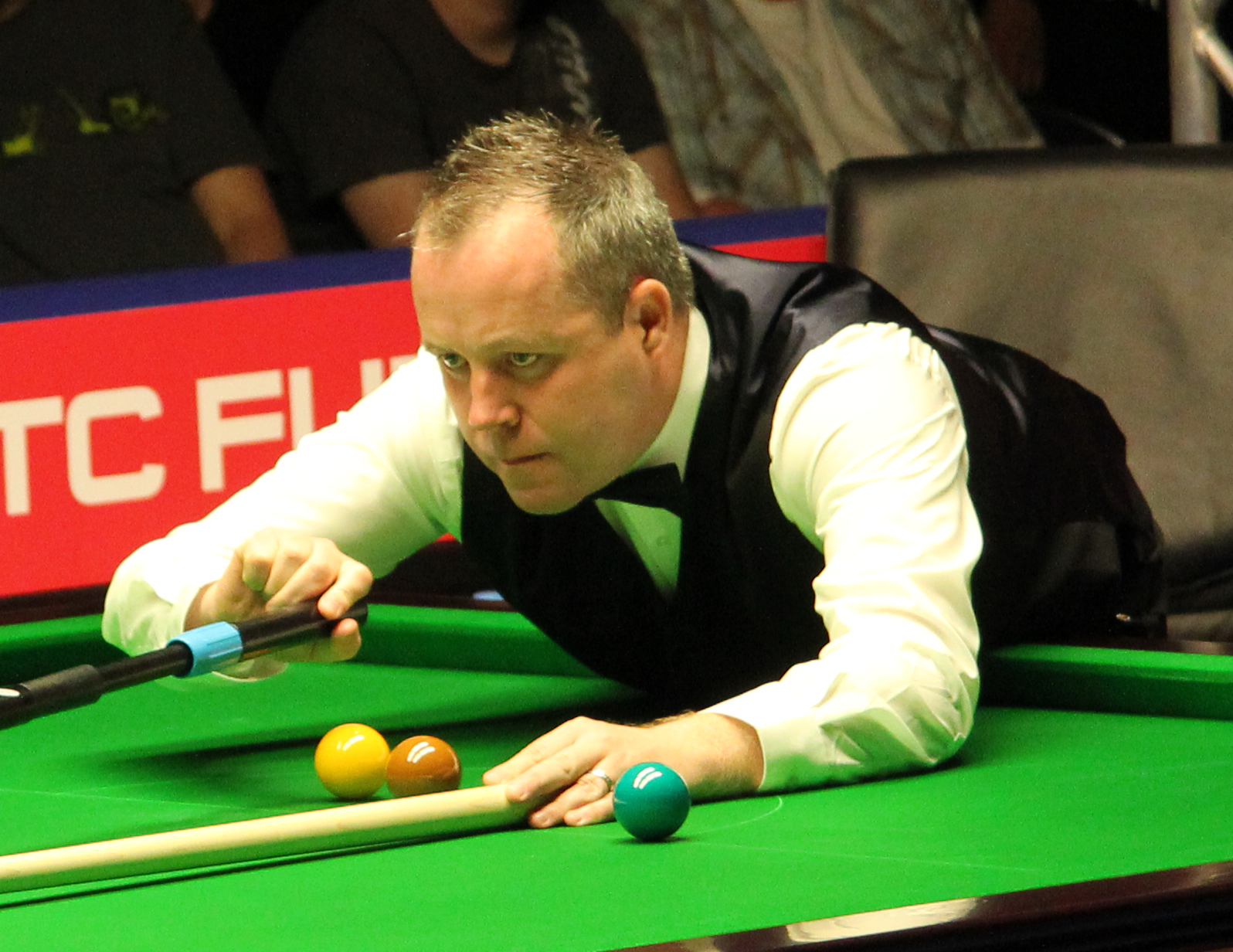

Personal information
- Born: May 18, 1975 (age 51)

Sport
- Country: Scotland
- Sport: Snooker
- Professional: 1992–present
- Highest ranking: 1

No. 3: Stephen Hendry
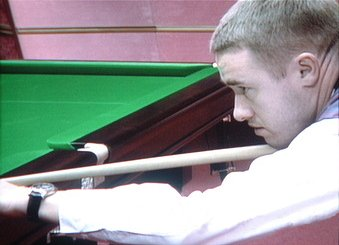

Personal information
- Born: January 13, 1969 (age 57)

Sport
- Country: Scotland
- Sport: Snooker
- Professional: 1985–2012, 2020–2024
- Highest ranking: 1

No.	Name	Nationality	Points
1	Mark Williams	Wales	57100
2	John Higgins	Scotland	44445
3	Stephen Hendry	Scotland	42570
4	Ronnie O'Sullivan	England	32640
5	Stephen Lee	England	31605
6	Matthew Stevens	Wales	31105
7	Ken Doherty	Ireland	29255
8	Alan McManus	Scotland	25510
9	Fergal O'Brien	Ireland	24702
10	John Parrott	England	24065
11	Anthony Hamilton	England	23515
12	Peter Ebdon	England	23355
13	Dave Harold	England	22737
14	Paul Hunter	England	22497
15	Marco Fu	Hong Kong	22329
16	Joe Swail	Northern Ireland	21590
17	Steve Davis	England	21500
18	Jimmy White	England	20587
19	Graeme Dott	Scotland	20112
20	Dominic Dale	Wales	19947
21	Chris Small	Scotland	19497
22	Mark King	England	19450
23	Nigel Bond	England	18822
24	Billy Snaddon	Scotland	18412
25	Darren Morgan	Wales	17194
26	Tony Drago	Malta	17072
27	James Wattana	Thailand	16975
28	Brian Morgan	England	16235
29	Drew Henry	Scotland	16200
30	Terry Murphy	Northern Ireland	15632
31	Joe Perry	England	15470
32	Quinten Hann	Australia	15445
33	Jamie Burnett	Scotland	15315
34	Gary Wilkinson	England	15072
35	Paul Davies	Wales	14410
36	Andy Hicks	England	13650
37	Bradley Jones	England	13355
38	Ian McCulloch	England	13096
39	David Finbow	England	12845
40	Anthony Davies	Wales	12610
41	Jimmy Michie	England	12554
42	Lee Walker	Wales	12489
43	Stuart Bingham	England	12320
44	Jonathan Birch	England	12264
45	Peter Lines	England	12010
46	Michael Judge	Republic of Ireland	11815
47	Marcus Campbell	Scotland	11799
48	Euan Henderson	Scotland	11615
49	Alain Robidoux	Canada	11415
50	Alfie Burden	England	11399
51	Rod Lawler	England	11390
52	David Gray	England	11345
53	Gary Ponting	England	11325
54	Jason Ferguson	England	11240
55	David Roe	England	11120
56	Paul Wykes	England	11089
57	Matthew Couch	England	10970
58	Gerard Greene	Northern Ireland	10951
59	Patrick Wallace	Northern Ireland	10855
60	Stuart Pettman	England	10830
61	Joe Johnson	England	10824
62	Michael Holt	England	10805
63	John Read	England	10722
64	Steve James	England	10636
75	Robert Milkins	England	
77	Mark Davis	England	
92	Ali Carter	England	
100	Stephen Maguire	Scotland	
122	Mark Selby	England	
189	Barry Hawkins	England	
