= 1994 Strachan Challenge – Event 2 =

Strachan Challenge – Event 2
Tournament information
- Dates: 14–20 March 1994
- Venue: Willie Thorne Snooker Lodge
- City: Leicester
- Country: England
- Organisation: WPBSA
- Format: Non–ranking event
- Total prize fund: £45,000
- Winner's share: £5,000
- Highest break: Dominic Dale (WAL) (144)

Final
- Champion: (England) Anthony Hamilton
- Runner-up: (Wales) Paul Davies
- Score: 9–4

The 1994 Strachan Challenge – Event 2 was a professional non-ranking snooker tournament, which took place from 14 to 20 March 1994 at the Willie Thorne Snooker Lodge in Leicester, England.

Anthony Hamilton won the tournament by defeating Paul Davies nine frames to four in the final.

== Main draw ==
Last 32; Best of 9 frames
(England) Anthony Hamilton	5
(England) Steve Meakin	4
(England) Matt Wilson	5
(Scotland) John Higgins	2
(England) Antony Bolsover	5
(Scotland) David McLellan	3
(England) Nick Dyson	5
(England) Craig Edwards	3
(Wales) Mark Bennett	5
(Wales) Neil Tomkins	1
(England) Tim Bailey	5
(Republic of Ireland) Fergal O'Brien	0
(Wales) Dominic Dale	5
(Republic of Ireland) Stephen Murphy	1
(Malta) Tony Drago	5
(England) Eddie Manning	4
(Wales) Paul Davies	5
(England) Anthony Taylor	2
(Finland) Robin Hull	5
(England) Paul Cavney	1
(England) Tony Knowles	5
(England) Dean Reynolds	3
(England) Gary Wilkinson	5
(England) Neil Mosley	4
(England) Troy Shaw	5
(England) Steve Duggan	2
(Northern Ireland) Jason Prince	5
(England) Bradley Jones	2
(Wales) Mark Williams	5
(England) Gary Ponting	1
(England) Rod Lawler	5
(England) Darryn Walker	3

Last 16; Best of 9 frames
(England) Anthony Hamilton	5
(England) Matt Wilson	3
(England) Antony Bolsover	5
(England) Nick Dyson	2
(Wales) Mark Bennett	5
(England) Tim Bailey	2
(Wales) Dominic Dale	5
(Malta) Tony Drago	3
(Wales) Paul Davies	5
(Finland) Robin Hull	1
(England) Tony Knowles	5
(England) Gary Wilkinson	4
(England) Troy Shaw	5
(Northern Ireland) Jason Prince	2
(Wales) Mark Williams	5
(England) Rod Lawler	2

Quarter-finals; Best of 9 frames
(England) Anthony Hamilton	5
(England) Antony Bolsover	3
(Wales) Mark Bennett	5
(Wales) Dominic Dale	2
(Wales) Paul Davies	5
(England) Tony Knowles	0
(England) Troy Shaw	5
(Wales) Mark Williams	4

Semi-finals; Best of 9 frames
(England) Anthony Hamilton	5
(Wales) Mark Bennett	2
(Wales) Paul Davies	5
(England) Troy Shaw	4

Final; Best of 17 frames
(England) Anthony Hamilton	9
(Wales) Paul Davies	4
