= 1994 Strachan Challenge – Event 1 =

Strachan Challenge – Event 1
Tournament information
- Dates: February 1994
- Venue: Jimmy White Snooker Lodge
- City: Aldershot
- Country: England
- Organisation: WPBSA
- Format: Non–ranking event
- Winner's share: £5,000

Final
- Champion: (England) Anthony Hamilton
- Runner-up: (England) Andy Hicks
- Score: 9–4

The 1994 Strachan Challenge – Event 1 was a professional non-ranking snooker tournament, that was held in February 1994 at the Jimmy White Snooker Lodge in Aldershot, England.

Anthony Hamilton won the tournament by defeating Andy Hicks nine frames to four in the final.

== Main draw ==
Last 32; Best of 9 frames
(England) Anthony Hamilton	5
(England) Danny Fowler	1
(Republic of Ireland) Fergal O'Brien	5
(England) Steve Judd	2
(England) Ian McCulloch	5
(England) Stuart Parnell	1
(England) Jason Weston	5
(England) Lee Richardson	3
(England) Rod Lawler	5
(England) Tony Knowles	3
(England) Stephen Lee	5
(England) Robert Marshall	1
(England) Stefan Mazrocis	5
(England) Karl Payne	3
(England) David Finbow	5
(England) Paul Davison	1
(England) Andy Hicks	5
(Wales) Dominic Dale	4
(England) Mark Flowerdew	5
(England) James Vicarey	2
(Malta) Tony Drago	5
(England) Mike Hallett	3
(Scotland) Drew Henry	5
(Wales) Paul Davies	3
(England) Bradley Jones	5
(England) Darren Limburg	3
(Scotland) Billy Snaddon	5
(England) Pat Kenny	2
(England) Matt Wilson	5
(England) Eddie Manning	3
(Northern Ireland) Joe Swail	5
(England) Steve Duggan	4

Last 16; Best of 9 frames
(England) Anthony Hamilton	5
(Republic of Ireland) Fergal O'Brien	0
(England) Ian McCulloch	5
(England) Jason Weston	3
(England) Rod Lawler	5
(England) Stephen Lee	3
(England) Stefan Mazrocis	5
(England) David Finbow	2
(England) Andy Hicks	5
(England) Mark Flowerdew	2
(Malta) Tony Drago	5
(Scotland) Drew Henry	3
(England) Bradley Jones	5
(Scotland) Billy Snaddon	4
(England) Matt Wilson	5
(Northern Ireland) Joe Swail	1

Quarter-finals; Best of 9 frames
(England) Anthony Hamilton	5
(England) Ian McCulloch	4
(England) Rod Lawler	5
(England) Stefan Mazrocis	1
(England) Andy Hicks	5
(Malta) Tony Drago	2
(England) Bradley Jones	5
(England) Matt Wilson	3

Semi-finals; Best of 9 frames
(England) Anthony Hamilton	5
(England) Rod Lawler	1
(England) Andy Hicks	5
(England) Bradley Jones	4

Final; Best of 17 frames
(England) Anthony Hamilton	9
(England) Andy Hicks	4
