= Paul Davies (snooker player) =

Welsh snooker player

Personal information
- Born: 22 June 1970 (age 56)

Sport
- Country: Wales
- Sport: Snooker
- Professional: 1991–2011
- Highest ranking: 35
- Best ranking finish: Semi-final (x2)

Paul Davies (born 22 June 1970) is a Welsh former professional snooker player who lives in Cardiff. He turned professional in 1991.

Initially based in Hampshire, Davies began his career in which he was mentored by a local amateur snooker player by the name of Bert Garland who died in 1996.

== Career ==
He made an immediate impact, reaching two semi-finals in his first 3 seasons – the 1991 Dubai Classic and the 1993 Asian Open, losing to the eventual champions (John Parrott and Dave Harold) in each case. However he has never gone this far in a ranking event again. He has never qualified for the World Championship, losing in the final qualifying round four times.

In 1997 he was runner up to Andy Hicks in the Benson and Hedges Qualifying, losing 6–9 in the final, denying him a place at the wildcard stage at Wembley. He reached the quarter-Finals of the 1997 Welsh Open with wins over Dave Harold, Chris Small and Ken Doherty before Mark Williams ended his run by beating him 5–3.

He came close to defeating Ding Junhui in the 2006 Northern Ireland Trophy, losing 4–5 in the last 48 to the eventual champion. He qualified for the 2007 Grand Prix, producing two shocks in his group, beating Jamie Cope the previous year's runner up and Stephen Hendry, effectively knocking the latter out the tournament. However he lost his other 3 matches eventually finishing 5th in his group.

He had a good run in the 2007 UK Championship, enjoying wins over Kurt Maflin 9–6, Mark Davis 9–8, before defeating Dominic Dale 9–3 to reach the last 32 and earn a place in the televised stages, where he did well to hold Shaun Murphy to 4–4, before Murphy eventually won 9–5.

== Performance and rankings timeline ==
Tournament	1990/ 91	1991/ 92	1992/ 93	1993/ 94		1994/ 95	1995/ 96	1996/ 97	1997/ 98	1998/ 99	1999/ 00	2000/ 01	2001/ 02	2002/ 03	2003/ 04	2004/ 05	2005/ 06	2006/ 07	2007/ 08	2008/ 09	2009/ 10	2010/ 11	2020/ 21
Ranking (Note: It shows the ranking at the beginning of the season)	(Note: He was an amateur)	(Note: New players on the Main Tour do not have a ranking)	48	36		55	66	53	48	41	38	35	57	65	74	78	65	57	62	57	54	64	
Ranking tournaments
European Masters (Note: The event was also called the Irish Open (1998/1999), the European Open (1990/1991-1996/1997 and 2001/2002-2003/2004) and the Malta Cup (2004/2005-2007/2008))	A	LQ	LQ	LQ		LQ	LQ	1R	NH	2R	Not Held		LQ	LQ	LQ	LQ	LQ	LQ	NR	Not Held			A
UK Championship	A	LQ	1R	LQ		1R	2R	LQ	1R	2R	1R	LQ	LQ	LQ	LQ	LQ	LQ	LQ	1R	LQ	LQ	LQ	A
Scottish Open (Note: The event was also called the International Open (1992/1993-1996/1997) and the Players Championship (2003/2004))	Not Held		QF	LQ		1R	LQ	LQ	LQ	2R	3R	LQ	LQ	LQ	LQ	Tournament Not Held							A
World Grand Prix	Tournament Not Held																						DNQ
German Masters (Note: The event was also called the German Open (1995/1996-1997/1998))	Tournament Not Held						LQ	1R	LQ	NR	Tournament Not Held											A	A
Shoot Out	NR	Tournament Not Held																				NR	1R
Welsh Open	A	1R	1R	LQ		3R	LQ	QF	1R	LQ	LQ	LQ	LQ	LQ	1R	LQ	LQ	LQ	LQ	1R	LQ	WD	A
Players Championship (Note: The event was also called the Players Tour Championship Finals (2010/2011))	Tournament Not Held																					DNQ	DNQ
Tour Championship	Tournament Not Held																						DNQ
World Championship	A	LQ	LQ	LQ		LQ	LQ	LQ	LQ	LQ	LQ	LQ	LQ	LQ	LQ	LQ	LQ	LQ	LQ	LQ	LQ	A	A
Non-ranking tournaments
The Masters	A	LQ	A	LQ		LQ	LQ	LQ	LQ	LQ	LQ	LQ	LQ	LQ	LQ	A	A	LQ	LQ	A	A	A	A
Former ranking tournaments
Classic	A	LQ	Tournament Not Held																				
Strachan Open	NH	LQ	MR	NR		Tournament Not Held																	
Asian Classic (Note: The event was also called the Dubai Classic (1990/1991–1994/1995) and the Thailand Classic (1995/1996))	A	SF	1R	LQ		1R	LQ	LQ	Tournament Not Held														
Malta Grand Prix	Tournament Not Held					Non-Ranking Event					LQ	NR	Tournament Not Held										
Thailand Masters (Note: The event was also called the Asian Open (1990/1991-1992/1993) and the Thailand Open (1993/1994-1996/1997))	A	LQ	SF	LQ		LQ	LQ	LQ	LQ	1R	LQ	LQ	LQ	NR	Not Held			NR	Tournament Not Held				
British Open	A	2R	2R	LQ		1R	LQ	LQ	2R	2R	LQ	LQ	2R	LQ	LQ	LQ	Tournament Not Held						
Irish Masters	Non-Ranking Event													LQ	LQ	1R	NH	NR	Tournament Not Held				
Northern Ireland Trophy	Tournament Not Held																NR	1R	LQ	LQ	Not Held		
Bahrain Championship	Tournament Not Held																			LQ	Not Held		
Shanghai Masters	Tournament Not Held																		LQ	LQ	LQ	LQ	NH
World Open (Note: The event was also called the LG Cup (2001/2002-2003/2004) and the Grand Prix (1990/1991-2000/2001 and 2004/2005-2009/2010))	A	2R	LQ	LQ		1R	LQ	1R	2R	LQ	LQ	LQ	LQ	LQ	LQ	LQ	1R	LQ	RR	LQ	LQ	LQ	NH
China Open (Note: The event was also called the China International (1997/1998-1998/1999))	Tournament Not Held								NR	QF	LQ	LQ	LQ	Not Held		LQ	LQ	LQ	LQ	LQ	LQ	A	NH
Former non-ranking tournaments
World Masters	2R	Tournament Not Held																					
Strachan Open	NH	R	MR	1R	F	Tournament Not Held																	
Malta Grand Prix	Tournament Not Held					1R	A	A	A	A	R	A	Tournament Not Held										
Merseyside Professional Championship	Not Held			A		A	A	A	A	A	A	A	QF	A	1R	1R	Tournament Not Held						

Performance Table Legend
LQ	lost in the qualifying draw	#R	lost in the early rounds of the tournament (WR = Wildcard round, RR = Round robin)	QF	lost in the quarter-finals
SF	lost in the semi-finals	F	lost in the final	W	won the tournament
DNQ	did not qualify for the tournament	A	did not participate in the tournament	WD	withdrew from the tournament

NH / Not Held	means an event was not held.
NR / Non-Ranking Event	means an event is/was no longer a ranking event.
R / Ranking Event	means an event is/was a ranking event.
MR / Minor-Ranking Event	means an event is/was a minor-ranking event.

== Career finals ==
=== Non-ranking finals: 2 ===
Outcome	No.	Year	Championship	Opponent	Score	Ref.
Runner-up	1.	1994	Strachan Challenge – Event 2	(England) Anthony Hamilton	4–9	
Runner-up	2.	1997	Benson & Hedges Championship	(England) Andy Hicks	6–9	

=== Pro–am finals: 2 (1 title) ===
Outcome	No.	Year	Championship	Opponent	Score	Ref.
Runner-up	1.	1990	Pontins Spring Open	(England) Tony Rampello	2–7	
Winner	1.	2006	TCC Open Snooker Championship	(Wales) Mark Williams	7–4	
