= 2001–02 snooker world rankings =

No. 1: Mark Williams
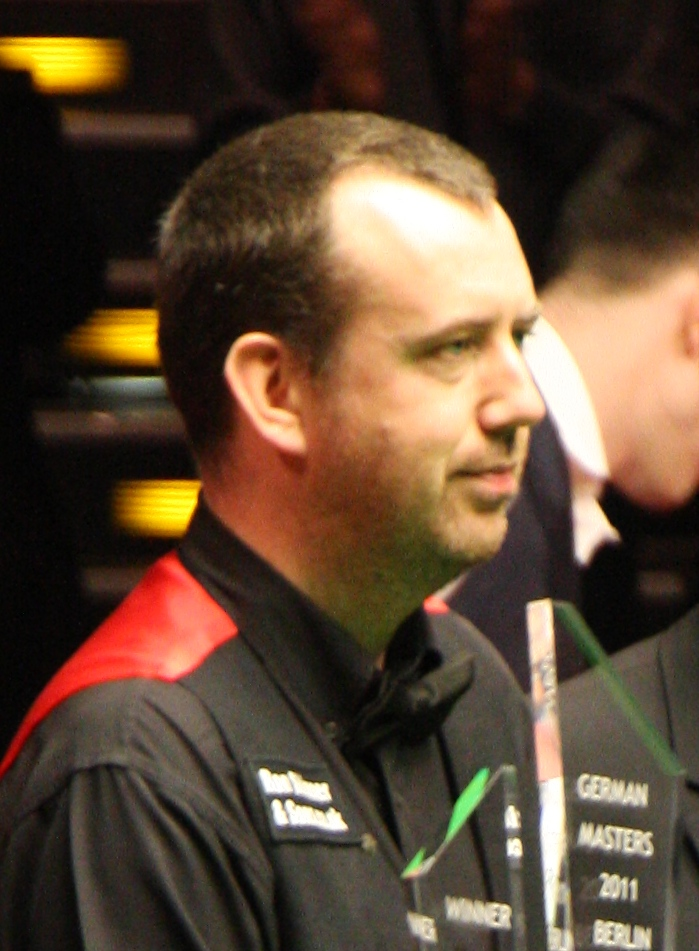

Personal information
- Born: March 21, 1975 (age 51)

Sport
- Country: Wales
- Sport: Snooker
- Professional: 1992–present
- Highest ranking: 1

Preceded by 2000–01	2001–02	Succeeded by 2002–03

2001–02 snooker world rankings: The professional world rankings for the top 64 snooker players in the 2001‍–‍02 season are listed below.

No. 2: Ronnie O'Sullivan
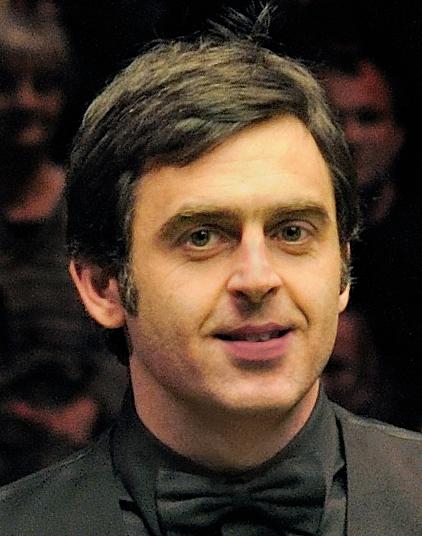

Personal information
- Born: December 5, 1975 (age 50)

Sport
- Country: England
- Sport: Snooker
- Professional: 1992–present
- Highest ranking: 1

No. 3: John Higgins
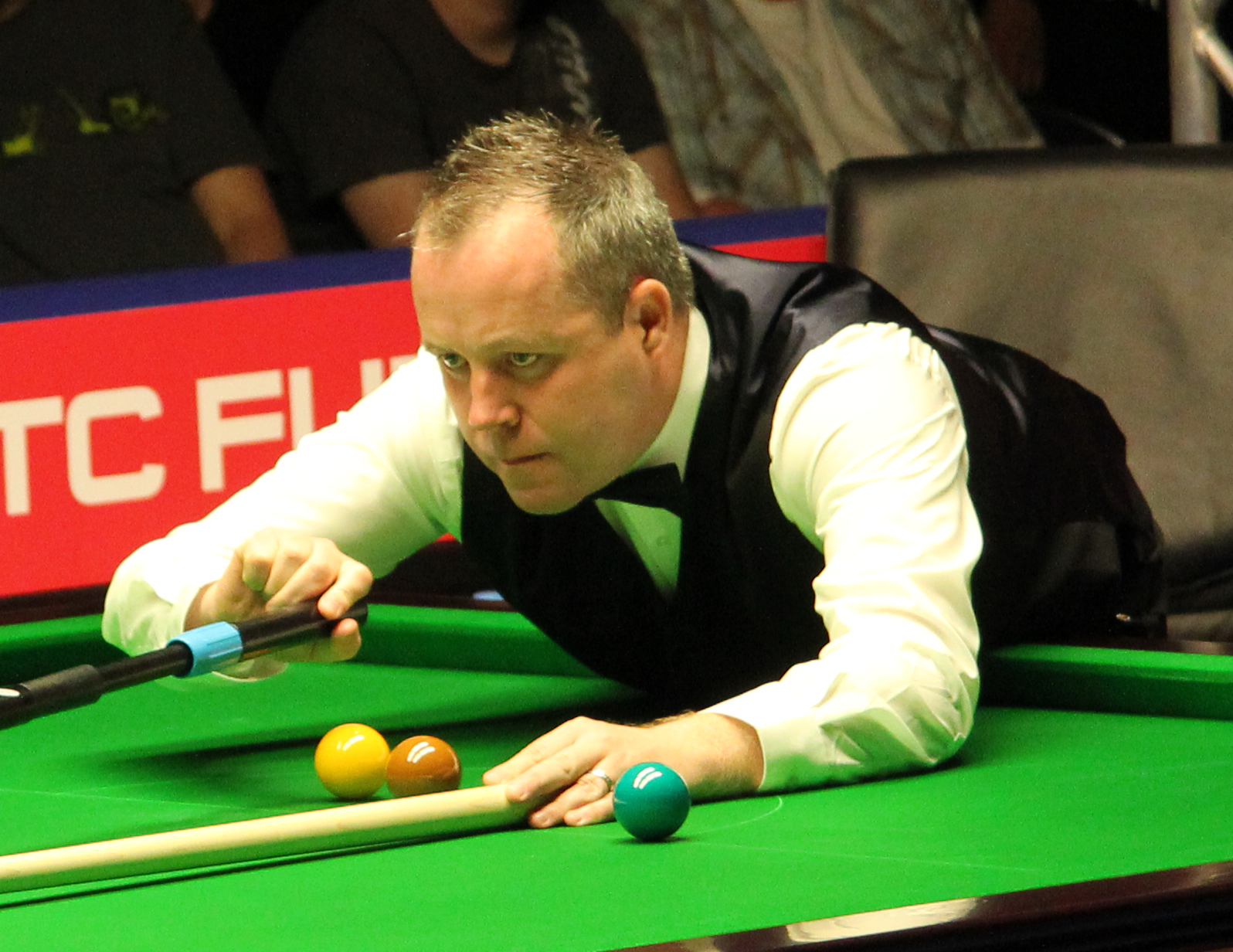

Personal information
- Born: May 18, 1975 (age 51)

Sport
- Country: Scotland
- Sport: Snooker
- Professional: 1992–present
- Highest ranking: 1

No.	Name	Nationality	Points
1	Mark Williams	Wales	53390
2	Ronnie O'Sullivan	England	45599
3	John Higgins	Scotland	43724
4	Ken Doherty	Ireland	38339
5	Stephen Hendry	Scotland	35603
6	Matthew Stevens	Wales	32884
7	Peter Ebdon	England	32662
8	Stephen Lee	England	29924
9	Paul Hunter	England	25884
10	Joe Swail	Northern Ireland	24872
11	Jimmy White	England	23584
12	Alan McManus	Scotland	21940
13	Mark King	England	21875
14	Graeme Dott	Scotland	21764
15	Dave Harold	England	21430
16	Fergal O'Brien	Ireland	21131
17	Marco Fu	Hong Kong	20800
18	Drew Henry	Scotland	20626
19	Anthony Hamilton	England	20621
20	Dominic Dale	Wales	19514
21	Steve Davis	England	19505
22	John Parrott	England	19413
23	Nigel Bond	England	18663
24	Chris Small	Scotland	18365
25	Quinten Hann	Australia	17765
26	Billy Snaddon	Scotland	17153
27	Joe Perry	England	17014
28	Michael Judge	Ireland	16808
29	Tony Drago	Malta	16521
30	David Gray	England	16206
31	Anthony Davies	Wales	15716
32	James Wattana	Thailand	15634
33	Brian Morgan	England	15063
34	Patrick Wallace	Northern Ireland	15014
35	Terry Murphy	Northern Ireland	14628
36	Jamie Burnett	Scotland	14150
37	Gary Wilkinson	England	14033
38	Alfie Burden	England	13887
39	Darren Morgan	Wales	13695
40	Shokat Ali	Pakistan	13641
41	Marcus Campbell	Scotland	13486
42	Jimmy Michie	England	12815
43	Bradley Jones	England	12759
44	Stuart Bingham	England	12675
45	Michael Holt	England	12654
46	Andy Hicks	England	12636
47	David Finbow	England	12115
48	Ian McCulloch	England	12002
49	David Roe	England	11913
50	Jonathan Birch	England	11688
51	Nick Dyson	England	11408
52	Stephen Maguire	Scotland	11219
53	Gary Ponting	England	10952
54	Robert Milkins	England	10853
55	Stuart Pettman	England	10800
56	Jason Ferguson	England	10763
57	Paul Davies	Wales	10712
58	Lee Walker	Wales	10639
59	Peter Lines	England	10563
60	Mark Davis	England	10440
61	Ali Carter	England	10364
62	Steve James	England	10258
63	Gerard Greene	Northern Ireland	10242
64	Rod Lawler	England	10195
85	Barry Hawkins	England	
95	Mark Selby	England	
