= Patrick Delsemme =

Belgian snooker player (1974–2022)

- Born: 13 September 1974; Rocourt, Belgium
- Died: 8 December 2022 (aged 48); Casablanca, Morocco
- Occupation: Snooker player

Patrick Delsemme (13 September 1974 – 8 December 2022) was a Belgian snooker player from Liège. He has been named one of the greatest Belgian snooker talents ever.

== Biography ==
When he was 17 years old, he finished second at the under-21 world championships in Bangalore, losing in the final to Ronnie O'Sullivan. A year later, he finished again second in Brunei, losing this time to Robin Hull. Delsemme became Belgian junior champion in 1991 and 1992 and became senior champion in 1995 and 1997. He was a professional player for seven years. In 2001, he had his best season where he was ranked 107th in the world, he was suspended for two years after testing positive for the use of cannabis twice. He also lost his ranking points and also had to pay back the prize money he won at those tournaments (£11,000). Afterwards, he made a splendid 147 in an amateur event in Belgium playing with.... a borrowed cue, and won the Belgian 40+ Championship in 2018. He was still competing in amateur championships in snooker as well as in English pool. His last snooker official competition was an Open tournament in Liège involving most of his snooker friends, not far away from his home.

In 2022, Delsemme had taken part by invitation in a major snooker tournament in Casablanca, Morocco, where he died on 8 December 2022, at the age of 48.
