= 1993–94 snooker season =

Details
- Duration: 1 August 1993 – 29 May 1994
- Tournaments: 19 (9 ranking events)

Triple Crown winners
- UK Championship: (England) Ronnie O'Sullivan
- Masters: (Scotland) Alan McManus
- World Championship: (Scotland) Stephen Hendry

The 1993–94 snooker season was a series of snooker tournaments played between August 1993 and May 1994. The following table outlines the results for ranking events and the invitational events.

== Calendar ==
Start	Finish	Country	Tournament name	Venue	City	Winner	Runner-up	Score	Ref.
28 Aug		ENG	Pot Black	BBC Studios	Birmingham	(England) Steve Davis	(England) Mike Hallett	2–0 (Note: All matches were recorded in one day, and then broadcast in half hour programme weekly.)	
22 Sep	26 Sep	SCO	Scottish Masters	Civic Centre	Motherwell	(Republic of Ireland) Ken Doherty	(Scotland) Alan McManus	10–9	
4 Oct	10 Oct	UAE	Dubai Classic	Al Nasr Stadium	Dubai	(Scotland) Stephen Hendry	(England) Steve Davis	9–3	
18 Oct	31 Oct	ENG	Grand Prix	Hexagon Theatre	Reading	(England) Peter Ebdon	(Republic of Ireland) Ken Doherty	9–6	
6 Nov	10 Nov	SCO	Benson & Hedges Championship	Masters Club	Glasgow	(England) Ronnie O'Sullivan	(Scotland) John Lardner	9–6	
12 Nov	28 Nov	ENG	UK Championship	Guild Hall	Preston	(England) Ronnie O'Sullivan	(Scotland) Stephen Hendry	10–6	
12 Dec	19 Dec	BEL	European Open	Arenahal	Antwerp	(Scotland) Stephen Hendry	(England) Ronnie O'Sullivan	9–5	
21 Dec	23 Dec	THA	King's Cup	Channel 9 Auditorium	Bangkok	(Thailand) James Wattana	(Wales) Darren Morgan	8–3	
30 Jan	5 Feb	WAL	Welsh Open	Newport Centre	Newport	(England) Steve Davis	(Scotland) Alan McManus	9–6	
6 Feb	13 Feb	ENG	The Masters	Wembley Conference Centre	London	(Scotland) Alan McManus	(Scotland) Stephen Hendry	9–8	
13 Feb	19 Feb	ENG	International Open	Bournemouth International Centre	Bournemouth	(England) John Parrott	(Thailand) James Wattana	9–4	
22 Feb	? Feb	ENG	Strachan Challenge – Event 1	Jimmy White Snooker Lodge	Aldershot	(England) Anthony Hamilton	(England) Andy Hicks	9–4	
14 Mar	20 Mar	ENG	Strachan Challenge – Event 2	Willie Thorne Snooker Lodge	Leicester	(England) Anthony Hamilton	(Wales) Paul Davies	9–4	
4 Mar	16 Mar	THA	Thailand Open	Imperial Queens Park Hotel	Bangkok	(Thailand) James Wattana	(England) Steve Davis	9–7	
20 Mar	27 Mar	IRL	Irish Masters	Goff's	Kill	(England) Steve Davis	(Scotland) Alan McManus	9–8	
30 Mar	7 Apr	ENG	British Open	Plymouth Pavilions	Plymouth	(England) Ronnie O'Sullivan	(Thailand) James Wattana	9–4	
16 Apr	2 May	ENG	World Snooker Championship	Crucible Theatre	Sheffield	(Scotland) Stephen Hendry	(England) Jimmy White	18–17	
7 May	14 May	WAL	Pontins Professional	Pontins	Prestatyn	(Republic of Ireland) Ken Doherty	(England) Nigel Bond	9–5	
? Jan	29 May	GER	European League	Atlantis Rheinhotel	Bingen	(Scotland) Stephen Hendry	(England) John Parrott	10–7	

Ranking event
Non-ranking event

== Official rankings ==
The top 16 of the world rankings, these players automatically played in the final rounds of the world ranking events and were invited for the Masters.

No.	Ch.	Name
1	Steady	(Scotland) Stephen Hendry
2	Steady	(England) John Parrott
3	Steady	(England) Jimmy White
4	Steady	(England) Steve Davis
5	▲	(Thailand) James Wattana
6	▲	(Scotland) Alan McManus
7	▲	(England) Willie Thorne
8	▼	(Wales) Terry Griffiths
9	Steady	(England) Nigel Bond
10	▲	(Wales) Darren Morgan
11	▲	(Republic of Ireland) Ken Doherty
12	Steady	(England) Martin Clark
13	▼	(England) Steve James
14	▼	(England) Neal Foulds
15	▼	(Northern Ireland) Dennis Taylor
16	▲	(England) David Roe
