= 2003 European Open (snooker) =

Tournament information
- Dates: 11–16 March 2003
- Venue: Palace Hotel
- City: Torquay
- Country: England
- Organisation: WPBSA
- Format: Ranking event
- Total prize fund: £250,000
- Winner's share: £44,000
- Highest break: Ronnie O'Sullivan (ENG) (142)

Final
- Champion: Ronnie O'Sullivan (ENG)
- Runner-up: Stephen Hendry (SCO)
- Score: 9–6

The 2003 European Open was a professional snooker tournament and the fifth of eight WPBSA ranking events in the 2002/2003 season, following the Welsh Open. It was held from 11 to 16 March 2003 at the Palace Hotel in Torquay, England. This marked the first and only time when any of the editions of this tournament was not held outside the British Isles. Ronnie O'Sullivan won his 12th ranking title by defeating Stephen Hendry 9–6 in the final. O'Sullivan went on to win back-to-back ranking titles – his next coming at the 2003 Irish Masters, just two weeks later, where he triumphed over John Higgins in a deciding frame.

== Tournament summary ==
Defending champion Stephen Hendry was the number 1 seed with World Champion Peter Ebdon seeded 2. The remaining places were allocated to players based on the world rankings.

== Prize fund ==
The breakdown of prize money for this year is shown below:

- Winner: £44,000
- Final: £22,000
- Semi-final: £11,000
- Quarter-final: £6,800
- Last 16: £4,000
- Last 32: £2,600
- Last 48: £1,450
- Last 64: £1,050
- Last 80: £700
- Last 96: £375
- Stage one highest break: £1,000
- Stage two highest break: £3,000
- Stage one maximum break: £5,000
- Stage two maximum break: £20,000
- Total: £250,000

== Main draw ==
Last 32; Best of 9 frames
1	(Scotland) Stephen Hendry	5
(England) Dave Harold	3
12	(Scotland) Graeme Dott	5
(Malta) Tony Drago	3
10	(England) Jimmy White	3
(Northern Ireland) Gerard Greene	5
5	(Scotland) John Higgins	5
(England) Barry Pinches	1
6	(Republic of Ireland) Ken Doherty	5
(England) David Gray	1
9	(England) Paul Hunter	5
(Finland) Robin Hull	2
15	(Scotland) Alan McManus	1
(Belgium) Bjorn Haneveer	5
4	(Wales) Mark Williams	5
(England) Steve Davis	1
3	(England) Ronnie O'Sullivan	5
(England) Michael Holt	3
13	(England) Joe Perry	4
(England) Dave Finbow	5
14	(Australia) Quinten Hann	5
(Scotland) Jamie Burnett	4
7	(England) Stephen Lee	5
(England) Robert Milkins	4
8	(Wales) Matthew Stevens	5
(England) Ian McCulloch	1
11	(England) Mark King	5
(England) David Roe	3
16	(Northern Ireland) Joe Swail	5
(England) Mark Davis	4
2	(England) Peter Ebdon	5
(Hong Kong) Marco Fu	2

Last 16; Best of 9 frames
1	(Scotland) Stephen Hendry	5
12	(Scotland) Graeme Dott	4
(Northern Ireland) Gerard Greene	4
5	(Scotland) John Higgins	5
6	(Republic of Ireland) Ken Doherty	3
9	(England) Paul Hunter	5
(Belgium) Bjorn Haneveer	1
4	(Wales) Mark Williams	5
3	(England) Ronnie O'Sullivan	5
(England) Dave Finbow	3
14	(Australia) Quinten Hann	3
7	(England) Stephen Lee	5
8	(Wales) Matthew Stevens	3
11	(England) Mark King	5
16	(Northern Ireland) Joe Swail	2
2	(England) Peter Ebdon	5

Quarter-finals; Best of 9 frames
1	(Scotland) Stephen Hendry	5
5	(Scotland) John Higgins	2
9	(England) Paul Hunter	2
4	(Wales) Mark Williams	5
3	(England) Ronnie O'Sullivan	5
7	(England) Stephen Lee	2
11	(England) Mark King	4
2	(England) Peter Ebdon	5

Semi-finals; Best of 11 frames
1	(Scotland) Stephen Hendry	6
4	(Wales) Mark Williams	3
3	(England) Ronnie O'Sullivan	6
2	(England) Peter Ebdon	3

Final; Best of 17 frames
1	(Scotland) Stephen Hendry	6
3	(England) Ronnie O'Sullivan	9

== Final ==
Final: Best of 17 frames. Referee: Jan Verhaas. Palace Hotel, Torquay, England, 16 March 2003.
Stephen Hendry (1); Scotland	6–9	Ronnie O'Sullivan (3); England
Afternoon: 0–140 (140), 100–11, 101–7 (101), 0–76 (76), 5–65 (52), 3–131 (126), 8–76 (76), 88–33 (88); Evening: 0–142 (142), 97–25 (53), 123–1 (117), 0–77 (77), 72–37 (72), 50–79 (Hendry 50), 0–79 (79)
117	Highest break	142
2	Century breaks	3
6	50+ breaks	8

== Qualifying ==
=== Round 1 ===
Best of 9 frames

(England) Craig Butler	5–3	(India) Manan Chandra
(England) Peter Lines	0–5	(England) Simon Bedford
(England) Sean Storey	5–2	(China) Pang Weiguo
(Northern Ireland) Jason Prince	5–2	(England) Ricky Walden
(Thailand) Phaitoon Phonbun	5–2	(Scotland) Hugh Abernethy
(England) Adrian Gunnell	5–1	(Thailand) Atthasit Mahitthi
(England) Jason Ferguson	5–4	(England) Jamie Cope
(England) Stephen Kershaw	5–3	(Wales) Peter Roscoe
(Iceland) Kristján Helgason	5–4	(England) David Gilbert
(England) John Read	w/o–w/d	(Wales) Matthew Farrant
(England) Andrew Higginson	5–0	(England) Justin Astley
(England) Andrew Norman	5–2	(Wales) James Reynolds
(England) Paul Wykes	5–0	(Republic of Ireland) Colm Gilcreest
(Scotland) Martin Dziewialtowski	w/o–w/d	(England) Eddie Manning
(England) Matthew Couch	5–0	(England) Jimmy Robertson
(Wales) Paul Davies	5–0	(Republic of Ireland) Leo Fernandez

(England) Neal Foulds	3–5	(Wales) David John
(Scotland) Euan Henderson	w/d–w/o	(China) Jin Long
(England) Paul Davison	1–5	(Canada) Bob Chaperon
(England) Jeff Cundy	3–5	(Netherlands) Stefan Mazrocis
(England) Shaun Murphy	5–1	(England) Jason Weston
(England) Luke Fisher	5–1	(England) Lee Spick
(England) Joe Johnson	4–5	(Scotland) David McLellan
(England) Rod Lawler	5–2	(Netherlands) Mario Wehrman
(England) Troy Shaw	5–2	(England) Darren Clarke
(Canada) Alain Robidoux	5–3	(England) Mark Gray
(England) Antony Bolsover	5–2	(Wales) David Donovan
(England) Rory McLeod	3–5	(England) Munraj Pal
(Wales) Lee Walker	2–5	(Thailand) Kwan Poomjang
(Wales) Ryan Day	4–5	(England) Matthew Selt
(England) Wayne Brown	5–4	(Australia) Johl Younger
(England) Tony Jones	3–5	(England) Nick Pearce

=== Round 2–5 ===
Round 2 Best of 9 frames
(England) Craig Butler	5
(England) Simon Bedford	4
(England) Sean Storey	5
(Northern Ireland) Jason Prince	0
(Thailand) Phaitoon Phonbun	3
(England) Adrian Gunnell	5
(England) Jason Ferguson	5
(England) Stephen Kershaw	4
(Iceland) Kristján Helgason	5
(England) John Read	4
(England) Andrew Higginson	5
(England) Andrew Norman	1
(England) Paul Wykes	4
(Scotland) Martin Dziewialtowski	5
(England) Matthew Couch	5
(Wales) Paul Davies	3
(Wales) David John	4
(China) Jin Long	5
(Canada) Bob Chaperon	2
(Netherlands) Stefan Mazrocis	5
(England) Shaun Murphy	4
(England) Luke Fisher	5
(Scotland) David McLellan	3
(England) Rod Lawler	5
(England) Troy Shaw	1
(Canada) Alain Robidoux	5
(England) Antony Bolsover	4
(England) Munraj Pal	5
(Thailand) Kwan Poomjang	5
(England) Matthew Selt	2
(England) Wayne Brown	3
(England) Nick Pearce	5

Round 3 Best of 9 frames
(England) Stuart Pettman	5
(England) Craig Butler	2
(England) Andy Hicks	2
(England) Sean Storey	5
(Northern Ireland) Gerard Greene	5
(England) Adrian Gunnell	4
(England) Barry Pinches	5
(England) Jason Ferguson	4
(England) Nick Walker	5
(Iceland) Kristján Helgason	1
(England) Bradley Jones	4
(England) Andrew Higginson	5
(Belgium) Bjorn Haneveer	5
(Scotland) Martin Dziewialtowski	1
(England) Jimmy Michie	2
(England) Matthew Couch	5
(England) Mike Dunn	5
(China) Jin Long	1
(England) Dave Finbow	5
(Netherlands) Stefan Mazrocis	3
(Scotland) Stephen Maguire	5
(England) Luke Fisher	1
(England) Barry Hawkins	5
(England) Rod Lawler	3
(England) Nick Dyson	5
(Canada) Alain Robidoux	4
(England) Mark Selby	3
(England) Munraj Pal	5
(England) Stuart Bingham	4
(Thailand) Kwan Poomjang	5
(Wales) Darren Morgan	5
(England) Nick Pearce	2

Round 4 Best of 9 frames
(England) Jonathan Birch	5
(England) Stuart Pettman	4
(Scotland) Marcus Campbell	5
(England) Sean Storey	3
(Northern Ireland) Terry Murphy	0
(Northern Ireland) Gerard Greene	5
(England) Alfie Burden	3
(England) Barry Pinches	5
(Pakistan) Shokat Ali	4
(England) Nick Walker	5
(Finland) Robin Hull	5
(England) Andrew Higginson	1
(Scotland) Billy Snaddon	3
(Belgium) Bjorn Haneveer	5
(Northern Ireland) Patrick Wallace	4
(England) Matthew Couch	5
(England) Michael Holt	5
(England) Mike Dunn	1
(England) Gary Wilkinson	2
(England) Dave Finbow	5
(Scotland) Jamie Burnett	5
(Scotland) Stephen Maguire	2
(England) Robert Milkins	5
(England) Barry Hawkins	4
(England) Ian McCulloch	5
(England) Nick Dyson	0
(England) David Roe	5
(England) Munraj Pal	1
(England) Mark Davis	5
(Thailand) Kwan Poomjang	0
(England) Brian Morgan	2
(Wales) Darren Morgan	5

Round 5 Best of 9 frames
(England) Dave Harold	5
(England) Jonathan Birch	4
(Malta) Tony Drago	5
(Scotland) Marcus Campbell	2
(Wales) Dominic Dale	1
(Northern Ireland) Gerard Greene	5
(England) John Parrott	0
(England) Barry Pinches	5
(England) David Gray	5
(England) Nick Walker	2
(Thailand) James Wattana	2
(Finland) Robin Hull	5
(England) Nigel Bond	4
(Belgium) Bjorn Haneveer	5
(England) Steve Davis	5
(England) Matthew Couch	2
(Scotland) Drew Henry	4
(England) Michael Holt	5
(England) Anthony Hamilton	4
(England) Dave Finbow	5
(Republic of Ireland) Fergal O'Brien	4
(Scotland) Jamie Burnett	5
(Republic of Ireland) Michael Judge	0
(England) Robert Milkins	5
(Wales) Anthony Davies	4
(England) Ian McCulloch	5
(Scotland) Chris Small	3
(England) David Roe	5
(England) Ali Carter	4
(England) Mark Davis	5
(Hong Kong) Marco Fu	5
(Wales) Darren Morgan	3

== Century breaks ==
=== Qualifying stage centuries ===
- 140 – Barry Pinches
- 138, 111 – Robert Milkins
- 133, 133, 101 – Adrian Gunnell
- 131, 115 – Stephen Maguire
- 130 – Antony Bolsover
- 128 – Marco Fu
- 128 – Ali Carter
- 121 – Jin Long
- 119 – David Gray
- 114, 103 – Stefan Mazrocis
- 114 – Andrew Higginson
- 113, 111 – Troy Shaw
- 113 – Mike Dunn
- 113 – Luke Fisher
- 109, 106 – Barry Hawkins
- 108 – Shaun Murphy
- 101 – Mark Davis
- 101 – Bjorn Haneveer
- 100 – Sean Storey
- 100 – Rod Lawler
- 100 – Munraj Pal

=== Televised stage centuries ===
- 142, 140, 139, 129, 126, 121, 112, 102 – Ronnie O'Sullivan
- 136 – Mark King
- 132 – Paul Hunter
- 123, 117, 110, 101 – Stephen Hendry
- 118 – Mark Williams
- 113, 111 – Peter Ebdon
- 112 – John Higgins
- 102 – Robin Hull
- 101 – Stephen Lee
