= 2003 Irish Masters =

Citywest Irish Masters
Tournament information
- Dates: 25–30 March 2003
- Venue: Citywest Hotel
- City: Dublin
- Country: Ireland
- Organisation: WPBSA
- Format: Ranking event
- Total prize fund: £400,000
- Winner's share: £48,000
- Highest break: Peter Ebdon (ENG) (142)

Final
- Champion: Ronnie O'Sullivan (ENG)
- Runner-up: John Higgins (SCO)
- Score: 10–9

The 2003 Citywest Irish Masters was a professional ranking snooker tournament that took place between 25 and 30 March 2003 at the Citywest Hotel in Dublin, Ireland.

Ronnie O'Sullivan won the title by defeating defending champion John Higgins 10–9 in the final.

== Prize fund ==
The breakdown of prize money for this year is shown below:

- Winner: £48,000
- Final: £24,000
- Semi-final: £11,500
- Quarter-final: £7,525
- Last 16: £6,600
- Last 32: £5,600
- Last 48: £3,000
- Last 64: £2,300
- Last 80: £1,600
- Last 96: £800
- Stage one highest break: £1,800
- Stage two highest break: £7,500
- Stage one maximum break: £5,000
- Stage two maximum break: £20,000
- Total: £400,000

== Main draw ==
Last 32; Best of 9 frames
(England) Peter Ebdon | 5
(England) Brian Morgan | 2
(Australia) Quinten Hann | 5
(Northern Ireland) Gerard Greene | 4
(Northern Ireland) Joe Swail | 3
(Scotland) Stephen Maguire | 5
(Republic of Ireland) Ken Doherty | 4
(England) Dave Harold | 5
(England) Stephen Lee | 1
(England) Steve Davis | 5
(England) Jimmy White | 1
(Scotland) Chris Small | 5
(Scotland) Alan McManus | 2
(England) Anthony Hamilton | 5
(Scotland) John Higgins | 5
(England) Robert Milkins | 2
(Wales) Mark Williams | 5
(England) Rod Lawler | 1
(Scotland) Graeme Dott | 1
(Scotland) Jamie Burnett | 5
(England) Paul Hunter | w/o
(Wales) Ryan Day | w/d
(Scotland) Stephen Hendry | 5
(England) Mark Selby | 2
(England) Joe Perry | 5
(England) Nick Dyson | 1
(Wales) Matthew Stevens | 5
(Scotland) Drew Henry | 2
(England) Mark King | 3
(England) Ali Carter | 5
(England) Ronnie O'Sullivan | 5
(England) Stuart Bingham | 3

Last 16; Best of 9 frames
(England) Peter Ebdon | 2
(Australia) Quinten Hann | 5
(Scotland) Stephen Maguire | 3
(England) Dave Harold | 5
(England) Steve Davis | 5
(Scotland) Chris Small | 1
(England) Anthony Hamilton | 2
(Scotland) John Higgins | 5
(Wales) Mark Williams | 5
(Scotland) Jamie Burnett | 1
(England) Paul Hunter | 5
(Scotland) Stephen Hendry | 4
(England) Joe Perry | 4
(Wales) Matthew Stevens | 5
(England) Ali Carter | 1
(England) Ronnie O'Sullivan | 5

Quarter-finals; Best of 11 frames
(Australia) Quinten Hann | 3
(England) Dave Harold | 6
(England) Steve Davis | 4
(Scotland) John Higgins | 6
(Wales) Mark Williams | 1
(England) Paul Hunter | 6
(Wales) Matthew Stevens | 2
(England) Ronnie O'Sullivan | 6

Semi-finals; Best of 11 frames
(England) Dave Harold | 4
(Scotland) John Higgins | 6
(England) Paul Hunter | 3
(England) Ronnie O'Sullivan | 6

Final; Best of 19 frames
(Scotland) John Higgins | 9
(England) Ronnie O'Sullivan | 10

== Final ==
Final: Best of 19 frames Citywest Hotel, Dublin, Ireland, 28 March 2004.
| John Higgins; Scotland | 9–10 | Ronnie O'Sullivan; England |
Afternoon: 35–98 (60), 0–62, 78–45 (52), 86–0 (86), 29–92 (59), 1–74 (68), 55–80, 83–0 (60); Evening: 131–0 (131), 77–39 (51), 0–132 (128), 23–69 (68), 92–0 (92), 79–0 (73), 5–115 (82), 87–14 (52), 0–76 (76), 127–0 (123), 0–128 (128)
| 131 | Highest break | 128 |
| 2 | Century breaks | 2 |
| 9 | 50+ breaks | 8 |

== Qualifying ==
=== Round 1 ===
Best of 9 frames

| (England) Jeff Cundy | 5–2 | (Republic of Ireland) Colm Gilcreest |
| (England) Andrew Higginson | 5–3 | (England) Ricky Walden |
| (Wales) Paul Davies | 4–5 | (England) David Gilbert |
| (England) Wayne Brown | 5–3 | (Wales) David John |
| (England) Rory McLeod | 4–5 | (Australia) Johl Younger |
| (Canada) Alain Robidoux | 1–5 | (Thailand) Kwan Poomjang |
| (England) John Read | 3–5 | (England) Simon Bedford |
| (England) Paul Wykes | 5–1 | (Thailand) Atthasit Mahitthi |
| (England) Sean Storey | 5–2 | (Canada) Bob Chaperon |
| (England) Jason Ferguson | 5–1 | (Scotland) Hugh Abernethy |
| (England) Matthew Couch | 5–1 | (Wales) David Donovan |
| (England) Tony Jones | 5–4 | (China) Jin Long |
| (Scotland) Euan Henderson | w/d–w/d | (Wales) Matthew Farrant |
| (Northern Ireland) Jason Prince | 5–2 | (England) Jimmy Robertson |
| (Scotland) Martin Dziewialtowski | 3–5 | (England) Darren Clarke |
| (Iceland) Kristján Helgason | 5–2 | (England) Matthew Selt |

| (England) Shaun Murphy | w/o–w/d | (England) Eddie Manning |
| (England) Rod Lawler | 5–4 | (England) Lee Spick |
| (England) Andrew Norman | 4–5 | (England) Jason Weston |
| (England) Adrian Gunnell | 5–3 | (England) Munraj Pal |
| (England) Paul Davison | 4–5 | (India) Manan Chandra |
| (Wales) Ryan Day | 5–0 | (Wales) Peter Roscoe |
| (Thailand) Phaitoon Phonbun | 5–4 | (Scotland) David McLellan |
| (England) Joe Johnson | 2–5 | (Wales) James Reynolds |
| (England) Stephen Kershaw | 4–5 | (England) Mark Gray |
| (England) Luke Fisher | 5–2 | (England) Justin Astley |
| (England) Antony Bolsover | 5–2 | (China) Pang Weiguo |
| (England) Craig Butler | 5–4 | (England) Nick Pearce |
| (England) Neal Foulds | 5–2 | (Netherlands) Stefan Mazrocis |
| (England) Troy Shaw | 4–5 | (Republic of Ireland) Leo Fernandez |
| (England) Peter Lines | 5–2 | (England) Jamie Cope |
| (Wales) Lee Walker | 5–2 | (Netherlands) Mario Wehrman |

=== Round 2–5 ===
Round 2 Best of 9 frames
(England) Jeff Cundy | 5
(England) Andrew Higginson | 2
(England) David Gilbert | 1
(England) Wayne Brown | 5
(Australia) Johl Younger | 1
(Thailand) Kwan Poomjang | 5
(England) Simon Bedford | 4
(England) Paul Wykes | 5
(England) Sean Storey | 5
(England) Jason Ferguson | 1
(England) Matthew Couch | 5
(England) Tony Jones | 1
Bye | w/d
(Northern Ireland) Jason Prince | w/o
(England) Darren Clarke | 2
(Iceland) Kristján Helgason | 5
(England) Shaun Murphy | 2
(England) Rod Lawler | 5
(England) Jason Weston | 1
(England) Adrian Gunnell | 5
(India) Manan Chandra | 0
(Wales) Ryan Day | 5
(Thailand) Phaitoon Phonbun | 3
(Wales) James Reynolds | 5
(England) Mark Gray | 5
(England) Luke Fisher | 3
(England) Antony Bolsover | 3
(England) Craig Butler | 5
(England) Neal Foulds | 2
(Republic of Ireland) Leo Fernandez | 5
(England) Peter Lines | 5
(Wales) Lee Walker | 2

Round 3 Best of 9 frames
(England) Andy Hicks | 5
(England) Jeff Cundy | 1
(Northern Ireland) Gerard Greene | 5
(England) Wayne Brown | 3
(Scotland) Stephen Maguire | 5
(Thailand) Kwan Poomjang | 4
(Belgium) Bjorn Haneveer | 4
(England) Paul Wykes | 5
(England) Bradley Jones | 4
(England) Sean Storey | 5
(England) Mike Dunn | 5
(England) Matthew Couch | 2
(England) Jimmy Michie | 4
(Northern Ireland) Jason Prince | 5
(England) Stuart Pettman | 5
(Iceland) Kristján Helgason | 4
(Wales) Darren Morgan | 1
(England) Rod Lawler | 5
(England) Barry Hawkins | 3
(England) Adrian Gunnell | 5
(England) Barry Pinches | 3
(Wales) Ryan Day | 5
(England) Mark Selby | 5
(Wales) James Reynolds | 2
(England) Dave Finbow | 5
(England) Mark Gray | 4
(England) Nick Dyson | 5
(England) Craig Butler | 3
(England) Nick Walker | 5
(Republic of Ireland) Leo Fernandez | 3
(England) Stuart Bingham | 5
(England) Peter Lines | 1

Round 4 Best of 9 frames
(England) Brian Morgan | 5
(England) Andy Hicks | 3
(Pakistan) Shokat Ali | 3
(Northern Ireland) Gerard Greene | 5
(Scotland) Billy Snaddon | 2
(Scotland) Stephen Maguire | 5
(England) Alfie Burden | 1
(England) Paul Wykes | 5
(Northern Ireland) Terry Murphy | 4
(England) Sean Storey | 5
(Northern Ireland) Patrick Wallace | 4
(England) Mike Dunn | 5
(England) Jonathan Birch | 0
(Northern Ireland) Jason Prince | 5
(England) Robert Milkins | 5
(England) Stuart Pettman | 2
(England) Mark Davis | 1
(England) Rod Lawler | 5
(Scotland) Jamie Burnett | 5
(England) Adrian Gunnell | 2
(England) Gary Wilkinson | 0
(Wales) Ryan Day | 5
(Finland) Robin Hull | 3
(England) Mark Selby | 5
(England) Ian McCulloch | 4
(England) Dave Finbow | 5
(England) Michael Holt | 3
(England) Nick Dyson | 5
(Scotland) Marcus Campbell | 1
(England) Nick Walker | 5
(England) David Roe | 0
(England) Stuart Bingham | 5

Round 5 Best of 9 frames
(Wales) Anthony Davies | 4
(England) Brian Morgan | 5
(Thailand) James Wattana | 4
(Northern Ireland) Gerard Greene | 5
(England) Nigel Bond | 3
(Scotland) Stephen Maguire | 5
(England) Dave Harold | 5
(England) Paul Wykes | 1
(England) Steve Davis | 5
(England) Sean Storey | 2
(Scotland) Chris Small | 5
(England) Mike Dunn | 4
(England) Anthony Hamilton | 5
(Northern Ireland) Jason Prince | 1
(Republic of Ireland) Michael Judge (Note: Matches were held over and played in Dublin.) | 3
(England) Robert Milkins | 5
(Wales) Dominic Dale | 4
(England) Rod Lawler | 5
(Hong Kong) Marco Fu | 4
(Scotland) Jamie Burnett | 5
(England) John Parrott | 4
(Wales) Ryan Day | 5
(England) David Gray | 4
(England) Mark Selby | 5
(Scotland) Drew Henry | 5
(England) Dave Finbow | 2
(Republic of Ireland) Fergal O'Brien | 2
(England) Nick Dyson | 5
(England) Ali Carter | 5
(England) Nick Walker | 1
(Malta) Tony Drago | 4
(England) Stuart Bingham | 5

== Century breaks ==
=== Qualifying stage centuries ===
- 129 – Fergal O'Brien
- 117 – Matthew Couch
- 116 – Ricky Walden
- 115 – Tony Drago
- 115 – Jason Ferguson
- 114 – Lee Spick
- 113, 108, 106 – Paul Wykes
- 112 – Marco Fu
- 110 – Nick Dyson
- 110 – Jason Prince
- 109, 104 – Adrian Gunnell
- 108 – Robert Milkins
- 107 – Kristján Helgason
- 105 – Ryan Day
- 102 – Sean Storey
- 100 – Robin Hull

=== Televised stage centuries ===
- 142 – Peter Ebdon
- 141 – Mark Williams
- 139 – Stuart Bingham
- 135 – Joe Swail
- 131, 123, 120, 110, 108, 104 – John Higgins
- 128, 128, 118, 106 – Ronnie O'Sullivan
- 125, 125, 108 – Stephen Hendry
- 120 – Ali Carter
- 118, 101 – Paul Hunter
- 118 – Chris Small
- 118 – Matthew Stevens
- 117 – Anthony Hamilton
- 117, 103 – Dave Harold
- 106 – Alan McManus
