= 2004 Irish Masters =

Citywest Irish Masters
Tournament information
- Dates: 21–28 March 2004
- Venue: Citywest Hotel
- City: Dublin
- Country: Ireland
- Organisation: WPBSA
- Format: Ranking event
- Total prize fund: £400,000
- Winner's share: £48,000
- Highest break: Mark King (ENG) (138)

Final
- Champion: Peter Ebdon (ENG)
- Runner-up: Mark King (ENG)
- Score: 10–7

The 2004 Citywest Irish Masters was a professional ranking snooker tournament that took place between 21 and 28 March 2004 at the Citywest Hotel in Dublin, Ireland.

Ronnie O'Sullivan was the defending champion, however he lost 2–6 to eventual champion Peter Ebdon in the quarter-finals.

Peter Ebdon won the title by defeating Mark King 10–7 in the final.

== Prize fund ==
The breakdown of prize money for this year is shown below:

- Winner: £48,000
- Runner-up: £24,000
- Semi-final: £12,000
- Quarter-final: £7,900
- Last 16: £6,900
- Last 32: £5,500
- Last 48: £2,900
- Last 64: £2,100
- Last 80: £1,600
- Last 96: £1,050
- Stage one highest break: £1,800
- Stage two highest break: £5,000
- Stage one maximum break: £5,000
- Stage two maximum break: £20,000
- Total: £400,000

== Main draw ==
Last 32; Best of 9 frames
1	(England) Ronnie O'Sullivan	5
(England) Michael Holt	2
11	(England) Steve Davis	4
(England) Brian Morgan	5
16	(England) Joe Perry	3
(England) Nigel Bond	5
7	(England) Peter Ebdon	5
(England) Ian McCulloch	2
5	(England) Stephen Lee	5
(Scotland) Stephen Maguire	0
14	(Australia) Quinten Hann	5
(Northern Ireland) Patrick Wallace	4
10	(Scotland) Alan McManus	1
(Hong Kong) Marco Fu	5
4	(Scotland) John Higgins	5
(Malta) Tony Drago	1
3	(Scotland) Stephen Hendry	4
(England) Mark King	5
15	(England) Jimmy White	5
(England) Gary Wilkinson	3
13	(Scotland) Graeme Dott	5
(Republic of Ireland) Colm Gilcreest	0
8	(England) Paul Hunter	5
(Wales) Lee Walker	0
6	(Republic of Ireland) Ken Doherty	5
(England) Stuart Bingham	1
12	(England) David Gray	5
(England) Mark Selby	4
9	(Wales) Matthew Stevens	1
(England) Anthony Hamilton	5
2	(Wales) Mark Williams	5
(Scotland) Jamie Burnett	1

Last 16; Best of 9 frames
1	(England) Ronnie O'Sullivan	5
(England) Brian Morgan	0
(England) Nigel Bond	3
7	(England) Peter Ebdon	5
5	(England) Stephen Lee	4
14	(Australia) Quinten Hann	5
(Hong Kong) Marco Fu	3
4	(Scotland) John Higgins	5
(England) Mark King	5
15	(England) Jimmy White	3
13	(Scotland) Graeme Dott	5
8	(England) Paul Hunter	2
6	(Republic of Ireland) Ken Doherty	5
12	(England) David Gray	1
(England) Anthony Hamilton	5
2	(Wales) Mark Williams	2

Quarter-finals; Best of 11 frames
1	(England) Ronnie O'Sullivan	2
7	(England) Peter Ebdon	6
14	(Australia) Quinten Hann	6
4	(Scotland) John Higgins	4
(England) Mark King	6
13	(Scotland) Graeme Dott	2
6	(Republic of Ireland) Ken Doherty	6
(England) Anthony Hamilton	5

Semi-finals; Best of 11 frames
7	(England) Peter Ebdon	6
14	(Australia) Quinten Hann	5
(England) Mark King	6
6	(Republic of Ireland) Ken Doherty	2

Final; Best of 19 frames
7	(England) Peter Ebdon	10
(England) Mark King	7

== Final ==
Final: Best of 19 frames Citywest Hotel, Dublin, Republic of Ireland, 28 March 2004.
Peter Ebdon (7); England	10–7	Mark King; England
Afternoon: 49–56, 78–8, 73–45, 9–70, 131–0 (131), 71–6 (57), 46–79 (79), 35–76; Evening: 78–40, 0–138 (138), 92–0 (92), 53–51, 76–38, 28–74, 73–46, 1–75, 94–37
131	Highest break	138
1	Century breaks	1
3	50+ breaks	2

== Qualifying ==
Qualifying for the tournament took place between 5–10 January 2004 at Pontin's in Prestatyn, Wales. Round 1 – Best of 9 frames

(England) Andrew Higginson 3–5 Mehmet Husnu (Cyprus)

(England) Adrian Gunnell 4–5 Paul Sweeny (England)

(England) David Gilbert 2–5 Supoj Saenla (Thailand)

(Iceland) Kristján Helgason w/d–w/o Kurt Maflin (Norway)

(England) Luke Fisher 3–5 Michael Rhodes (England)

(Wales) Ryan Day 5–4 Philip Williams (Wales)

(Northern Ireland) Jason Prince 5–3 Ian Brumby (England)

(England) Ricky Walden 4–5 Scott MacKenzie (Scotland)

(England) Craig Butler 4–5 Ding Junhui (China)

(England) Wayne Brown 5–2 Steve Mifsud (Australia)

(Scotland) Billy Snaddon 5–0 Gary Thomson (Scotland)

(Thailand) Kwan Poomjang 3–5 Ian Preece (Wales)

(Thailand) Atthasit Mahitthi w/o–w/d Alain Robidoux (Canada)

(Scotland) Martin Dziewialtowski 2–5 Adrian Rosa (England)

(Northern Ireland) Terry Murphy w/d–w/o Luke Simmonds (England)

(England) Jamie Cope 5–4 Stuart Mann (England)

(England) Matthew Couch 5–1 Ian Sargeant (Wales)

(England) Munraj Pal 5–3 Andy Neck (England)

(England) Peter Lines 3–5 Darryn Walker (England)

(Republic of Ireland) Leo Fernandez 4–5 Tom Ford (England)

(Republic of Ireland) Colm Gilcreest 5–2 Garry Hardiman (Republic of Ireland)

(England) Paul Wykes 2–5 Neil Robertson (Australia)

(Wales) Lee Walker 5–2 Michael Wild (England)

(England) Simon Bedford 5–0 Carlo Giagnacovo (England)

(England) Rory McLeod 5–0 James Leadbetter (England)

(England) Andrew Norman 5–2 Stephen Croft (England)

(England) Jason Ferguson 0–5 Steven Bennie (Scotland)

(Australia) Johl Younger 3–5 Joe Delaney (Republic of Ireland)

(Wales) Paul Davies 5–2 Liu Song (China)

(England) Bradley Jones 5–1 Joe Meara (Northern Ireland)

(England) Tony Jones 0–5 Martin Gould (England)

(England) Joe Johnson w/d–w/o Chris Melling (England)

Round 2 Best of 9 frames
(Cyprus) Mehmet Husnu	4
(England) Paul Sweeny	5
(Thailand) Supoj Saenla	1
(Norway) Kurt Maflin	5
(England) Michael Rhodes	4
(Wales) Ryan Day	5
(Northern Ireland) Jason Prince	5
(Scotland) Scott MacKenzie	3
(China) Ding Junhui	5
(England) Wayne Brown	0
(Scotland) Billy Snaddon	3
(Wales) Ian Preece	5
(Thailand) Atthasit Mahitthi	5
(England) Adrian Rosa	3
(England) Luke Simmonds	5
(England) Jamie Cope	4
(England) Matthew Couch	4
(England) Munraj Pal	5
(England) Darryn Walker	4
(England) Tom Ford	5
(Republic of Ireland) Colm Gilcreest	5
(Australia) Neil Robertson	4
(Wales) Lee Walker	5
(England) Simon Bedford	2
(England) Rory McLeod	2
(England) Andrew Norman	5
(Scotland) Steven Bennie	3
(Republic of Ireland) Joe Delaney	5
(Wales) Paul Davies	2
(England) Bradley Jones	5
(England) Martin Gould	5
(England) Chris Melling	3

Round 3 Best of 9 frames
(England) Nick Walker	5
(England) Paul Sweeny	3
(England) Alfie Burden	2
(Norway) Kurt Maflin	5
(England) David Roe	4
(Wales) Ryan Day	5
(England) Mike Dunn	5
(Northern Ireland) Jason Prince	1
(England) Rod Lawler	0
(China) Ding Junhui	5
(Northern Ireland) Patrick Wallace	5
(Wales) Ian Preece	3
(England) Shaun Murphy	5
(Thailand) Atthasit Mahitthi	3
(England) Andy Hicks	5
(England) Luke Simmonds	1
(Scotland) Marcus Campbell	1
(England) Munraj Pal	5
(England) Dave Finbow	1
(England) Tom Ford	5
(England) Nick Dyson	4
(Republic of Ireland) Colm Gilcreest	5
(Wales) Darren Morgan	1
(Wales) Lee Walker	5
(England) Jimmy Michie	2
(England) Andrew Norman	5
(Pakistan) Shokat Ali	3
(Republic of Ireland) Joe Delaney	5
(Belgium) Bjorn Haneveer	1
(England) Bradley Jones	5
(England) Sean Storey	5
(England) Martin Gould	4

Round 4 Best of 9 frames
(England) Michael Holt	5
(England) Nick Walker	1
(England) Brian Morgan	5
(Norway) Kurt Maflin	3
(England) Nigel Bond	5
(Wales) Ryan Day	3
(Thailand) James Wattana	0
(England) Mike Dunn	5
(Scotland) Stephen Maguire	5
(China) Ding Junhui	2
(England) Barry Hawkins	2
(Northern Ireland) Patrick Wallace	5
(England) Mark Davis	3
(England) Shaun Murphy	5
(Northern Ireland) Gerard Greene	5
(England) Andy Hicks	3
(Republic of Ireland) Fergal O'Brien	5
(England) Munraj Pal	4
(England) Gary Wilkinson	5
(England) Tom Ford	2
(England) Jonathan Birch	2
(Republic of Ireland) Colm Gilcreest	5
(England) Barry Pinches	4
(Wales) Lee Walker	5
(England) Stuart Bingham	5
(England) Andrew Norman	3
(Republic of Ireland) Michael Judge	5
(Republic of Ireland) Joe Delaney	2
(England) Stuart Pettman	5
(England) Bradley Jones	3
(Scotland) Jamie Burnett	5
(England) Sean Storey	4

Round 5 Best of 9 frames
(England) Robert Milkins	2
(England) Michael Holt	5
(Scotland) Drew Henry	2
(England) Brian Morgan	5
(Wales) Anthony Davies	0
(England) Nigel Bond	5
(England) Ian McCulloch	5
(England) Mike Dunn	2
(England) John Parrott	3
(Scotland) Stephen Maguire	5
(Wales) Dominic Dale	3
(Northern Ireland) Patrick Wallace	5
(Hong Kong) Marco Fu	5
(England) Shaun Murphy	3
(Malta) Tony Drago	5
(Northern Ireland) Gerard Greene	0
(England) Mark King	5
(Republic of Ireland) Fergal O'Brien	2
(Finland) Robin Hull	w/d
(England) Gary Wilkinson	w/o
(Northern Ireland) Joe Swail	4
(Republic of Ireland) Colm Gilcreest	5
(England) Ali Carter	4
(Wales) Lee Walker	5
(Scotland) Chris Small	3
(England) Stuart Bingham	5
(England) Mark Selby	5
(Republic of Ireland) Michael Judge	2
(England) Anthony Hamilton	5
(England) Stuart Pettman	3
(England) Dave Harold	w/d
(Scotland) Jamie Burnett	w/o

== Century breaks ==
=== Qualifying stage centuries ===
- 141 – Barry Pinches
- 141 – Michael Holt
- 138 – Shaun Murphy
- 135, 104 – Neil Robertson
- 134, 128, 118, 113 – Jamie Cope
- 132, 112, 107, 105 – Ryan Day
- 128 – Andy Hicks
- 120 – Bradley Jones
- 118, 100 – Fergal O'Brien
- 117, 107 – Ding Junhui
- 115 – Lee Walker
- 115 – Michael Judge
- 114, 100 – Patrick Wallace
- 112 – Paul Sweeny
- 111 – Nigel Bond
- 106 – Stephen Maguire
- 105 – Martin Gould
- 105 – Dominic Dale

=== Televised stage centuries ===
- 138, 137 – Mark King
- 136, 131, 125, 107 – Peter Ebdon
- 134, 111, 102 – Quinten Hann
- 118 – Nigel Bond
- 116 – Paul Hunter
- 116 – David Gray
- 114, 100, 100 – Anthony Hamilton
- 111 – John Higgins
- 106 – Ronnie O'Sullivan
- 106 – Mark Williams
- 105 – Joe Perry
- 101 – Jimmy White
