= 2003 LG Cup (snooker) =

LG Cup
Tournament information
- Dates: 4–12 October 2003
- Venue: Guild Hall
- City: Preston
- Country: England
- Organisation: WPBSA
- Format: Ranking event
- Total prize fund: £597,200
- Winner's share: £82,500
- Highest break: John Higgins (SCO) (147)

Final
- Champion: Mark Williams (WAL)
- Runner-up: John Higgins (SCO)
- Score: 9–5

The 2003 LG Cup was a professional ranking snooker tournament that took place between 4 and 12 October 2003 at the Guild Hall in Preston, England.

Mark Williams won the 15th ranking title of his career by defeating John Higgins 9–5 in the final. In the 11th frame of the final, Higgins made his 3rd maximum in professional competition.

Chris Small came into the tournament as defending champion, however he lost 5–3 to John Parrott in the quarter-finals.

== Tournament summary ==
Defending champion Chris Small was the number 1 seed with World Champion Mark Williams seeded 2. The remaining places were allocated to players based on the world rankings.

== Prize fund ==
The breakdown of prize money for this year is shown below:

- Winner: £82,500
- Final: £42,500
- Semi-final: £21,500
- Quarter-final: £11,800
- Last 16: £9,700
- Last 32: £7,600
- Last 48: £4,200
- Last 64: £3,100
- Last 80: £2,200
- Last 96: £1,500
- Stage one highest break: £1,800
- Stage two highest break: £5,000
- Stage one maximum break: £5,000
- Stage two maximum break: £20,000
- Total: £597,200

== Main draw ==
Last 48; Best of 9 frames
21 | (England) Robert Milkins | 2
47 | (England) Stuart Pettman | 5
29 | (England) Mark Selby | 2
43 | (England) Stuart Bingham | 5
24 | (Malta) Tony Drago | 4
(Wales) Lee Walker | 5
30 | (England) John Parrott | 5
35 | (England) Mark Davis | 3
20 | (England) Anthony Hamilton | 2
59 | (England) Alfie Burden | 5
26 | (England) Ian McCulloch | 2
64 | (England) Shaun Murphy | 5
17 | (England) Joe Perry | 5
37 | (Republic of Ireland) Michael Judge | 3
23 | (England) Dave Harold | 5
57 | (England) David Roe | 3
27 | (Northern Ireland) Joe Swail | 3
39 | (England) Michael Holt | 5
19 | (Hong Kong) Marco Fu | 5
(England) Simon Bedford | 0
31 | (Wales) Anthony Davies | 0
(Northern Ireland) Patrick Wallace | 5
28 | (Wales) Dominic Dale | 0
38 | (Northern Ireland) Gerard Greene | 5
22 | (England) Mark King | 3
42 | (England) Barry Hawkins | '5
18 | (England) Ali Carter | 5
58 | (England) Mike Dunn | 4
25 | (Scotland) Drew Henry | 3
34 | (Thailand) James Wattana | 5
32 | (Finland) Robin Hull | 5
36 | (England) Barry Pinches | 2

Last 32; Best of 9 frames
1 | (Scotland) Chris Small | 5
(England) Stuart Pettman | 4
9 | (England) Paul Hunter | 5
43 | (England) Stuart Bingham | 1
15 | (Australia) Quinten Hann | 1
(Wales) Lee Walker | 5
6 | (England) Stephen Lee | 4
30 | (England) John Parrott | 5
5 | (Scotland) John Higgins | 5
59 | (England) Alfie Burden | 0
12 | (England) Steve Davis | 4
64 | (England) Shaun Murphy | 5
10 | (Wales) Matthew Stevens | 5
17 | (England) Joe Perry | 1
4 | (England) Ronnie O'Sullivan | 5
23 | (England) Dave Harold | 0
3 | (Scotland) Stephen Hendry | 3
39 | (England) Michael Holt | 5
13 | (England) David Gray | 4
19 | (Hong Kong) Marco Fu | 5
16 | (England) Jimmy White | 5
(Northern Ireland) Patrick Wallace | 3
7 | (Republic of Ireland) Ken Doherty | 5
38 | (Northern Ireland) Gerard Greene | 2
8 | (England) Peter Ebdon | 4
42 | (England) Barry Hawkins | 5
14 | (Scotland) Graeme Dott | 3
18 | (England) Ali Carter | 5
11 | (Scotland) Alan McManus | 1
34 | (Thailand) James Wattana | 5
2 | (Wales) Mark Williams | 5
32 | (Finland) Robin Hull | 2

Last 16; Best of 9 frames
1 | (Scotland) Chris Small | 5
9 | (England) Paul Hunter | 3
(Wales) Lee Walker | 3
30 | (England) John Parrott | 5
5 | (Scotland) John Higgins | 5
64 | (England) Shaun Murphy | 2
10 | (Wales) Matthew Stevens | 5
4 | (England) Ronnie O'Sullivan | 0
39 | (England) Michael Holt | 5
19 | (Hong Kong) Marco Fu | 4
16 | (England) Jimmy White | 4
7 | (Republic of Ireland) Ken Doherty | 5
42 | (England) Barry Hawkins | 3
18 | (England) Ali Carter | 5
34 | (Thailand) James Wattana | 3
2 | (Wales) Mark Williams | 5

Quarter-finals; Best of 9 frames
1 | (Scotland) Chris Small | 3
30 | (England) John Parrott | 5
5 | (Scotland) John Higgins | 5
10 | (Wales) Matthew Stevens | 2
39 | (England) Michael Holt | 3
7 | (Republic of Ireland) Ken Doherty | 5
18 | (England) Ali Carter | 3
2 | (Wales) Mark Williams | 5

Semi-finals; Best of 11 frames
30 | (England) John Parrott | 2
5 | (Scotland) John Higgins | 6
7 | (Republic of Ireland) Ken Doherty | 3
2 | (Wales) Mark Williams | 6

Final; Best of 17 frames
5 | (Scotland) John Higgins | 5
2 | (Wales) Mark Williams | 9

== Final ==
Final: Best of 17 frames. Referee: Lawrie Annandale. Guild Hall, Preston, England, 12 October 2003.
| John Higgins (5); Scotland | 5–9 | Mark Williams (2); Wales |
Afternoon: 23–74 (74), 0–83 (83), 32–96 (65), 142–0 (142), 46–41, 0–127 (127), 84–33 (84), 33–70; Evening: 39–53, 91–8 (91), 147–0 (147), 0–78 (78), 42–68, 64–69 (Williams 51)
| 147 | Highest break | 127 |
| 2 | Century breaks | 1 |
| 4 | 50+ breaks | 6 |

== Qualifying ==
Qualifying for the tournament took place between 4 and 18 September 2003 at Pontin's in Prestatyn, Wales.

Round 1

Best of 9 frames

| (England) Paul Wykes | 5–4 | (Cyprus) Mehmet Husnu |
| (England) Tony Jones | 2–5 | (England) Luke Simmonds |
| (England) David Gilbert | 4–5 | (England) Darryn Walker |
| (Northern Ireland) Terry Murphy | w/o–w/d | (China) Liu Song |
| (England) Joe Johnson | w/d–w/o | (Thailand) Supoj Saenla |
| (Wales) Lee Walker | 5–4 | (Australia) Steve Mifsud |
| (Republic of Ireland) Colm Gilcreest | 2–5 | (China) Ding Junhui |
| (Wales) Paul Davies | 5–0 | (Scotland) Gary Thomson |
| (England) Craig Butler | 5–4 | (England) Chris Melling |
| (Republic of Ireland) Leo Fernandez | 0–5 | (England) Stephen Croft |
| (England) Munraj Pal | 4–5 | (Scotland) Scott MacKenzie |
| (Thailand) Kwan Poomjang | 5–3 | (Canada) Alain Robidoux |
| (England) Peter Lines | 5–2 | (England) Steven Bennie |
| (England) Rory McLeod | 5–2 | (England) Carlo Giagnacovo |
| (Australia) Johl Younger | 5–2 | (England) Michael Wild |
| (England) Ricky Walden | 5–3 | (Wales) Phil Williams |

| (England) Jason Ferguson | 1–5 | (England) Michael Rhodes |
| (England) Andrew Norman | 5–1 | (Wales) Ian Preece |
| (England) Simon Bedford | 5–1 | (Northern Ireland) Joe Meara |
| (Northern Ireland) Jason Prince | 5–4 | (Republic of Ireland) Garry Hardiman |
| (England) Bradley Jones | 5–4 | (England) James Leadbetter |
| (Iceland) Kristján Helgason | 4–5 | (England) Ian Brumby |
| (England) Wayne Brown | 0–5 | (Norway) Kurt Maflin |
| (England) Andrew Higginson | 3–5 | (England) Martin Gould |
| (Scotland) Billy Snaddon | 5–4 | (England) Stuart Mann |
| (England) Luke Fisher | 5–3 | (Republic of Ireland) Joe Delaney |
| (Wales) Ryan Day | 5–3 | (Australia) Neil Robertson |
| (Scotland) Martin Dziewialtowski | 4–5 | (England) Adrian Rosa |
| (England) Adrian Gunnell | 5–3 | (England) Paul Sweeny |
| (Thailand) Atthasit Mahitthi | 5–4 | (England) Andy Neck |
| (England) Jamie Cope | 4–5 | (Wales) Ian Sargeant |
| (England) Matthew Couch | 4–5 | (England) Tom Ford |

Round 2–4

Round 2 Best of 9 frames
(England) Paul Wykes | 5
(England) Luke Simmonds | 4
(England) Darryn Walker | 5
(Northern Ireland) Terry Murphy | 4
(Thailand) Supoj Saenla | 0
(Wales) Lee Walker | 5
(China) Ding Junhui | 5
(Wales) Paul Davies | 2
(England) Craig Butler | 5
(England) Stephen Croft | 4
(Scotland) Scott MacKenzie | 4
(Thailand) Kwan Poomjang | 5
(England) Peter Lines | 3
(England) Rory McLeod | 5
(Australia) Johl Younger | 1
(England) Ricky Walden | 5
(England) Michael Rhodes | 1
(England) Andrew Norman | 5
(England) Simon Bedford | 5
(Northern Ireland) Jason Prince | 4
(England) Bradley Jones | 2
(England) Ian Brumby | 5
(Norway) Kurt Maflin | 5
(England) Martin Gould | 3
(Scotland) Billy Snaddon | 5
(England) Luke Fisher | 2
(Wales) Ryan Day | 3
(England) Adrian Rosa | 5
(England) Adrian Gunnell | 5
(Thailand) Atthasit Mahitthi | 4
(Wales) Ian Sargeant | 5
(England) Tom Ford | 3

Round 3 Best of 9 frames
(England) Dave Finbow | 1
(England) Paul Wykes | 5
(Scotland) Marcus Campbell | 5
(England) Darryn Walker | 3
(England) Sean Storey | 1
(Wales) Lee Walker | 5
(Belgium) Bjorn Haneveer | 5
(China) Ding Junhui | 2
(England) Alfie Burden | 5
(England) Craig Butler | 3
(England) Shaun Murphy | 5
(Thailand) Kwan Poomjang | 4
(Pakistan) Shokat Ali | 2
(England) Rory McLeod | 5
(England) David Roe | 5
(England) Ricky Walden | 2
(England) Nick Dyson | 1
(England) Andrew Norman | 5
(England) Andy Hicks | 2
(England) Simon Bedford | 5
(Northern Ireland) Patrick Wallace | 5
(England) Ian Brumby | 3
(England) Jimmy Michie | 5
(Norway) Kurt Maflin | 1
(Wales) Darren Morgan | 2
(Scotland) Billy Snaddon | 5
(England) Mike Dunn | 5
(England) Adrian Rosa | 4
(England) Nick Walker | 2
(England) Adrian Gunnell | 5
(England) Rod Lawler | 2
(Wales) Ian Sargeant | 5

Round 4 Best of 9 frames
(England) Stuart Pettman | 5
(England) Paul Wykes | 4
(England) Stuart Bingham | 5
(Scotland) Marcus Campbell | 3
(England) Jonathan Birch | 1
(Wales) Lee Walker | 5
(England) Mark Davis | 5
(Belgium) Bjorn Haneveer | 1
(England) Nigel Bond | 2
(England) Alfie Burden | 5
(England) Brian Morgan | 4
(England) Shaun Murphy | 5
(Republic of Ireland) Michael Judge | 5
(England) Rory McLeod | 4
(Scotland) Jamie Burnett | 0
(England) David Roe | 5
(England) Michael Holt | 5
(England) Andrew Norman | 4
(England) Gary Wilkinson | 1
(England) Simon Bedford | 5
(Scotland) Stephen Maguire | 4
(Northern Ireland) Patrick Wallace | 5
(Northern Ireland) Gerard Greene | 5
(England) Jimmy Michie | 4
(England) Barry Hawkins | 5
(Scotland) Billy Snaddon | 2
(Republic of Ireland) Fergal O'Brien | 4
(England) Mike Dunn | 5
(Thailand) James Wattana | 5
(England) Adrian Gunnell | 2
(England) Barry Pinches | 5
(Wales) Ian Sargeant | 3

== Century breaks ==
=== Qualifying stage centuries ===
- 136, 102 – Brian Morgan
- 133 – Ian Brumby
- 128, 116 – Ding Junhui
- 123 – Patrick Wallace
- 118 – Bradley Jones
- 117, 111 – Adrian Rosa
- 115 – Martin Dziewialtowski
- 115 – Stephen Maguire
- 114, 100 – Kwan Poomjang
- 114 – Johl Younger
- 112 – Darryn Walker
- 108, 104 – Atthasit Mahitthi
- 108 – Michael Judge
- 107 – Ricky Walden
- 106 – Mark Davis
- 105 – Bjorn Haneveer
- 104 – Andrew Norman
- 102 – Barry Hawkins
- 101 – Jamie Cope
- 101 – Rory McLeod
- 100 – Billy Snaddon
- 100 – Stuart Pettman

=== Televised stage centuries ===
- 147, 142, 104 – John Higgins
- 140, 109, 100 – Ken Doherty
- 137 – John Parrott
- 127 – Mark Williams
- 122, 102 – Stephen Lee
- 111, 110 – Ali Carter
- 107 – Robin Hull
- 104 – Marco Fu
- 103 – Peter Ebdon
- 102 – Gerard Greene
- 102 – Joe Perry
- 101 – Michael Holt
- 101 – Stephen Hendry
- 100 – Jimmy White
