= 2005 Welsh Open (snooker) =

Tournament information
- Dates: 17–23 January 2005
- Venue: Newport Centre
- City: Newport
- Country: Wales
- Organisation: WPBSA
- Format: Ranking event
- Total prize fund: £225,000
- Winner's share: £35,000
- Highest break: Ronnie O'Sullivan (ENG) (146)

Final
- Champion: Ronnie O'Sullivan (ENG)
- Runner-up: Stephen Hendry (SCO)
- Score: 9–8

The 2005 Welsh Open was a professional ranking snooker tournament that took place between 17 and 23 January 2005 at the Newport Centre in Newport, Wales.

Ronnie O'Sullivan successfully defended his title by beating Stephen Hendry 9–8.

== Tournament summary ==
Defending champion and World Champion Ronnie O'Sullivan was the number 1 seed. The remaining places were allocated to players based on the world rankings.

== Prize fund ==
The breakdown of prize money for this year is shown below:

- Winner: £35,000
- Runner-up: £17,500
- Semi-final: £8,750
- Quarter-final: £6,500
- Last 16: £4,275
- Last 32: £2,750
- Last 48: £1,725
- Last 64: £1,325
- Highest break: £2,000
- Maximum break: £20,000
- Total: £225,000

== Main draw ==
Last 48; Best of 9 frames
17	(England) Ian McCulloch	5
47	(Finland) Robin Hull	3
25	(England) Anthony Hamilton	5
52	(England) David Roe	4
28	(England) Robert Milkins	0
68	(Australia) Neil Robertson	5
32	(Wales) Dominic Dale	5
40	(England) Mark Davis	4
20	(England) Joe Perry	5
46	(England) Brian Morgan	2
26	(Northern Ireland) Gerard Greene	0
57	(England) Rod Lawler	5
27	(Scotland) Drew Henry	5
66	(England) Rory McLeod	1
29	(England) Michael Holt	3
43	(England) Barry Hawkins	5
24	(Scotland) Stephen Maguire	5
37	(England) Stuart Bingham	3
18	(Australia) Quinten Hann	5
79	(England) Andrew Norman	1
22	(Malta) Tony Drago	4
65	(Pakistan) Shokat Ali	5
30	(Northern Ireland) Joe Swail	5
74	(England) Tom Ford	2
23	(England) Mark King	5
(England) Steve James	3
31	(England) John Parrott	5
76	(China) Ding Junhui	2
21	(England) Barry Pinches	1
45	(Wales) Ryan Day	5
19	(England) Ali Carter	5
61	(England) Adrian Gunnell	1

Last 32; Best of 9 frames
1	(England) Ronnie O'Sullivan	5
17	(England) Ian McCulloch	2
9	(England) Stephen Lee	4
25	(England) Anthony Hamilton	5
11	(England) Jimmy White	4
68	(Australia) Neil Robertson	5
5	(Scotland) John Higgins	5
32	(Wales) Dominic Dale	2
8	(England) Peter Ebdon	5
20	(England) Joe Perry	4
14	(England) David Gray	5
57	(England) Rod Lawler	1
10	(Scotland) Alan McManus	4
27	(Scotland) Drew Henry	5
4	(England) Paul Hunter	3
43	(England) Barry Hawkins	5
3	(Scotland) Stephen Hendry	5
24	(Scotland) Stephen Maguire	4
15	(Scotland) Graeme Dott	5
18	(Australia) Quinten Hann	2
16	(Hong Kong) Marco Fu	5
65	(Pakistan) Shokat Ali	2
7	(Republic of Ireland) Ken Doherty	5
30	(Northern Ireland) Joe Swail	2
6	(Wales) Matthew Stevens	4
23	(England) Mark King	5
12	(Scotland) Chris Small	2
31	(England) John Parrott	5
13	(England) Steve Davis	2
45	(Wales) Ryan Day	5
2	(Wales) Mark Williams	4
19	(England) Ali Carter	5

Last 16; Best of 9 frames
1	(England) Ronnie O'Sullivan	5
25	(England) Anthony Hamilton	3
68	(Australia) Neil Robertson	5
5	(Scotland) John Higgins	4
8	(England) Peter Ebdon	5
14	(England) David Gray	3
27	(Scotland) Drew Henry	2
43	(England) Barry Hawkins	5
3	(Scotland) Stephen Hendry	5
15	(Scotland) Graeme Dott	4
16	(Hong Kong) Marco Fu	1
7	(Republic of Ireland) Ken Doherty	5
23	(England) Mark King	5
31	(England) John Parrott	1
45	(Wales) Ryan Day	5
19	(England) Ali Carter	2

Quarter-finals; Best of 9 frames
1	(England) Ronnie O'Sullivan	5
68	(Australia) Neil Robertson	4
8	(England) Peter Ebdon	3
43	(England) Barry Hawkins	5
3	(Scotland) Stephen Hendry	5
7	(Republic of Ireland) Ken Doherty	2
23	(England) Mark King	5
45	(Wales) Ryan Day	4

Semi-finals; Best of 11 frames
1	(England) Ronnie O'Sullivan	6
43	(England) Barry Hawkins	4
3	(Scotland) Stephen Hendry	6
23	(England) Mark King	2

Final; Best of 17 frames
1	(England) Ronnie O'Sullivan	9
3	(Scotland) Stephen Hendry	8

== Final ==
Final: Best of 17 frames. Referee: Colin Brinded. Newport Centre, Newport, Wales, 23 January 2005.
Ronnie O'Sullivan (1); England	9–8	Stephen Hendry (3); Scotland
Afternoon: 0–96 (92), 42–74 (67), 69–55 (62), 0–140 (140), 72–65 (O'Sullivan 59, Hendry 57), 72–22, 60–30, 41–70 (69); Evening: 0–93 (93), 122–0 (102), 50–74, 0–71 (57), 106–0 (75), 108–6 (52), 132–0 (131), 8–71, 68–0 (67)
131	Highest break	140
2	Century breaks	1
7	50+ breaks	7

== Qualifying ==
Qualifying for the tournament took place at Pontin's in Prestatyn, Wales between 7 January and 9 January 2005.

Round 1 Best of 9 frames
(England) Simon Bedford	5
(Scotland) Hugh Abernethy	1
(Scotland) Scott MacKenzie	5
(England) Paul Davison	4
(England) Paul Wykes	5
(England) Brian Salmon	3
(England) David Hall	w/d
(Netherlands) Stefan Mazrocis	w/o
(England) Craig Butler	w/o
(England) Mark Gray	w/d
(Republic of Ireland) Leo Fernandez	3
(Northern Ireland) Sean O'Neill	5
(England) Rory McLeod	5
(Republic of Ireland) Rodney Goggins	1
(Wales) Paul Davies	3
(England) Adam Davies	5
(England) Alfie Burden	5
(England) Ben Woollaston	2
(England) Andrew Norman	5
(England) Mike Hallett	1
(Pakistan) Shokat Ali	5
(China) Liu Song	2
(England) Tom Ford	5
(England) Gary Wilson	3
(Wales) Darren Morgan	4
(England) Steve James	5
(China) Ding Junhui	5
(China) Jin Long	0
(Republic of Ireland) Joe Delaney	5
(Republic of Ireland) David McDonnell	3
(England) Ricky Walden	5
(England) Joe Jogia	1

Round 2 Best of 9 frames
(Scotland) Jamie Burnett	0
(England) Simon Bedford	5
(England) David Roe	5
(Scotland) Scott MacKenzie	4
(Australia) Neil Robertson	5
(England) Paul Wykes	2
(England) Jimmy Michie	5
(Netherlands) Stefan Mazrocis	2
(Wales) Lee Walker	2
(England) Craig Butler	5
(England) Rod Lawler	5
(Northern Ireland) Sean O'Neill	0
(England) Jonathan Birch	3
(England) Rory McLeod	5
(England) Sean Storey	5
(England) Adam Davies	3
(England) Gary Wilkinson	1
(England) Alfie Burden	5
(Belgium) Bjorn Haneveer	2
(England) Andrew Norman	5
(England) Nick Walker	1
(Pakistan) Shokat Ali	5
(Wales) Anthony Davies	2
(England) Tom Ford	5
(Scotland) Marcus Campbell	1
(England) Steve James	5
(England) Mike Dunn	4
(China) Ding Junhui	5
(England) Andy Hicks	5
(Republic of Ireland) Joe Delaney	1
(England) Adrian Gunnell	5
(England) Ricky Walden	3

Round 3 Best of 9 frames
(Finland) Robin Hull	5
(England) Simon Bedford	4
(Republic of Ireland) Fergal O'Brien	4
(England) David Roe	5
(England) Dave Harold	3
(Australia) Neil Robertson	5
(England) Mark Davis	5
(England) Jimmy Michie	4
(England) Brian Morgan	5
(England) Craig Butler	2
(England) Nigel Bond	2
(England) Rod Lawler	5
(England) Shaun Murphy	1
(England) Rory McLeod	5
(England) Barry Hawkins	5
(England) Sean Storey	0
(England) Stuart Bingham	5
(England) Alfie Burden	2
(England) Nick Dyson	3
(England) Andrew Norman	5
(Republic of Ireland) Michael Judge	3
(Pakistan) Shokat Ali	5
(Northern Ireland) Patrick Wallace	2
(England) Tom Ford	5
(England) Stuart Pettman	2
(England) Steve James	5
(England) Mark Selby	3
(China) Ding Junhui	5
(Wales) Ryan Day	5
(England) Andy Hicks	3
(Thailand) James Wattana	0
(England) Adrian Gunnell	5

== Century breaks ==
=== Qualifying stage centuries ===
- 143 – Alfie Burden
- 137, 125, 106, 104 – Tom Ford
- 133 – Jonathan Birch
- 128, 110, 108 – Ryan Day
- 121 – Mike Dunn
- 113 – Stuart Bingham
- 110, 100 – Robin Hull
- 110, 105 – Andrew Norman
- 105 – Gary Wilson
- 104 – Anthony Hamilton
- 103 – Ding Junhui
- 100 – Fergal O'Brien
- 100 – Neil Robertson
- 100 – Mark Davis

=== Televised stage centuries ===
- 146, 133, 131, 127, 126, 114, 110, 102, 102, 101 – Ronnie O'Sullivan
- 140, 128, 125, 119, 119, 103 – Stephen Hendry
- 138, 117 – Ali Carter
- 133 – Ken Doherty
- 132 – Joe Perry
- 129 – Drew Henry
- 123, 108 – Peter Ebdon
- 120, 100 – Marco Fu
- 116 – Alan McManus
- 113, 102 – Barry Hawkins
- 103 – David Gray
- 103 – Ian McCulloch
