= 2002 World Snooker Championship =

Professional snooker tournament

2002 Embassy World Snooker Championship

Tournament information
- Dates: 20 April – 6 May 2002
- Venue: Crucible Theatre
- City: Sheffield
- Country: England
- Organisation: WPBSA
- Format: Ranking event
- Total prize fund: £1,615,770
- Winner's share: £260,000
- Highest break: Matthew Stevens (WAL) (145)

Final
- Champion: Peter Ebdon (ENG)
- Runner-up: Stephen Hendry (SCO)
- Score: 18–17

The 2002 World Snooker Championship (also referred to as the 2002 Embassy World Snooker Championship for the purposes of sponsorship) was a professional snooker tournament that took place from 20 April to 6 May 2002 at the Crucible Theatre in Sheffield, England. It was the final ranking event of the 2001–02 snooker season. This was the 26th consecutive year that the World Snooker Championship had been held at the Crucible, marking the 25th anniversary of the first staging of the event at this venue. The championship was sponsored by cigarette manufacturer Embassy.

Peter Ebdon won his only world title by defeating seven-time winner Stephen Hendry 18–17 in the final. Ebdon defeated Matthew Stevens 17–16 in the semi-finals, and Hendry defeated the defending champion Ronnie O'Sullivan 17–13 to reach the final. This was Hendry's ninth and last appearance in a World Championship final. There were 65 century breaks during the tournament. The highest break of the tournament was by Stevens, who achieved 145 in his quarter-final match. Hendry made 16 centuries during the event, a record for any individual tournament, equalled by Mark Williams in 2022. A total prize fund of £1,615,770 was awarded at the event, the winner receiving £260,000

== Overview ==
The World Snooker Championship is the official world championship of the game of professional snooker, organised by World Snooker. Founded in the late 19th century by British Army soldiers stationed in India, the sport was popular in the British Isles. In the modern era it has become increasingly popular worldwide, especially in East and Southeast Asian nations such as China, Hong Kong and Thailand. (Note: The "modern era" of snooker is understood to have started in 1969, when the World Championship reverted to a knockout format.)

The championship featured 32 professional players competing in one-on-one snooker matches in a single elimination format, each played over several frames. The 32 competitors in the main tournament were selected using a combination of the top players in the world snooker rankings and a pre-tournament qualification stage. Joe Davis won the first World Championship in 1927, the final match being held in Camkin's Hall, Birmingham, England. Since 1977, the event has been held in the Crucible Theatre in Sheffield, England. The championship was sponsored by cigarette manufacturer Embassy.

=== Format ===
The championship was held from 20 April and 6 May 2002 at the Crucible Theatre, the 26th consecutive year that the tournament was held at the venue. It was the ninth and last ranking event of the 2001–02 snooker season on the World Snooker Tour. There were 120 entrants from the tour, and the competition's main draw had 32 participants. Following a seven-round amateur qualifying tournament, a six-round knockout qualifying competition was held at the Manhattan Club, Harrogate, the Telford International Centre and the Newport Centre in Newport, Wales. This qualifying tournament produced the 16 qualifying players who progressed into the main draw to play the top 16 seeds.

The top 16 players in the latest world rankings automatically qualified for the main draw as seeded players. As defending champion, Ronnie O'Sullivan was seeded first for the event with world number one Mark Williams seeded second; the remaining seeds were allocated based on the players' world ranking positions. Matches in the first round of the main draw were played as best-of-19-frames. The number of frames needed to win a match increased to being the best-of-25 in the second round and quarter-finals, and best-of-33 in the semi-finals; the final match was played as best-of-35-frames.

=== Prize fund ===
The tournament featured a prize fund of £1,615,770 with the winner receiving £260,000 and bonuses for completing a maximum break. The breakdown of prize money for the event is shown below:

- Winner: £260,000
- Runner-up: £152,000
- Semi-final: £76,000
- Quarter-final: £38,000
- Last 16: £21,000
- Last 32: £14,500
- Last 48: £11,000
- Last 64: £6,825
- Last 80: £5,500
- Last 96: £4,150
- Last 128: £1,185
- Qualification highest break: £2,250
- Main stage highest break: £20,000
- Qualification maximum break: £5,000
- Main stage maximum break: £147,000
- Total: £1,615,770

== Tournament summary ==
=== First round ===
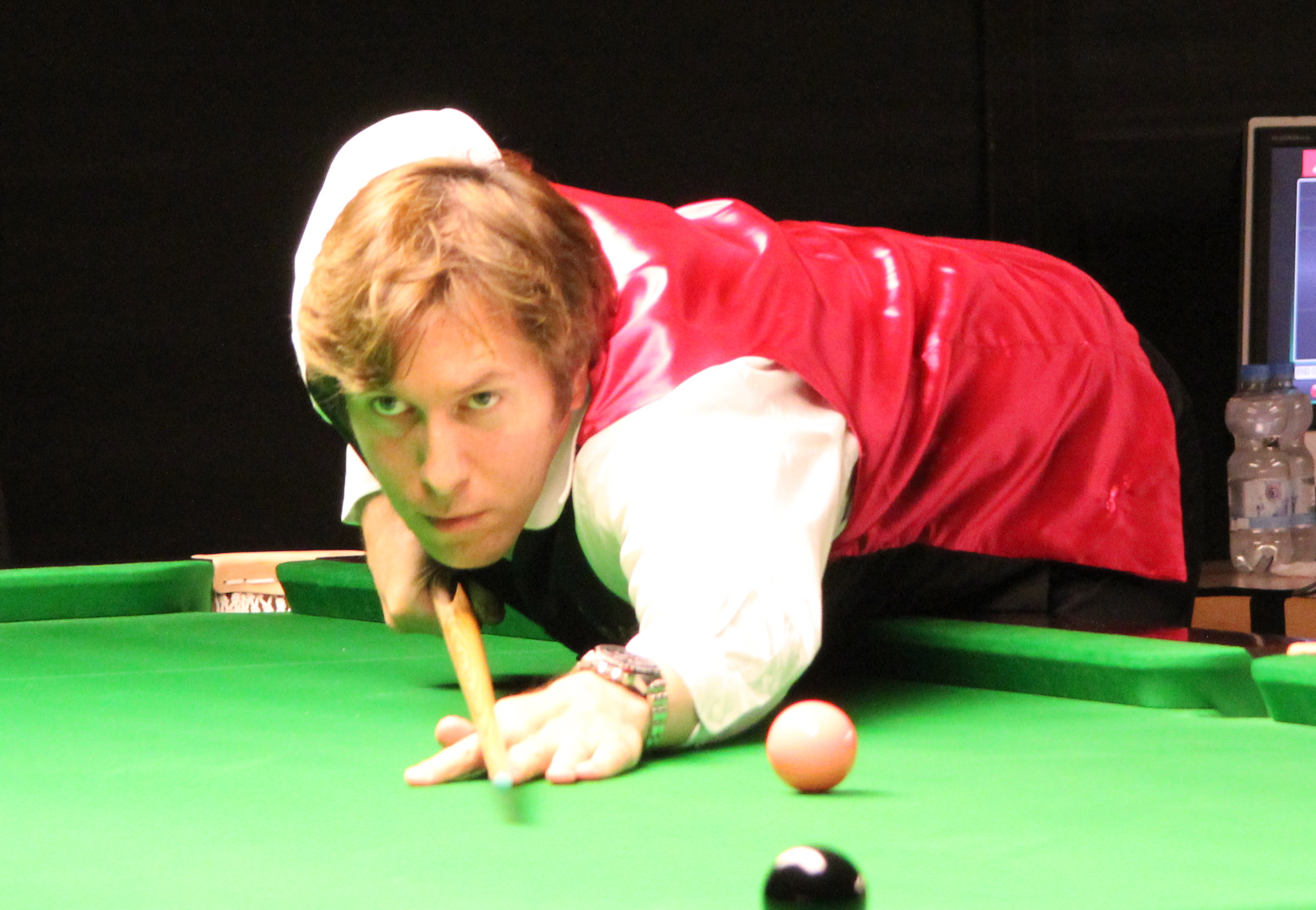
Dominic Dale (pictured in 2011) deliberately snapped his cue after his 2–10 defeat to Jimmy White.

The first round was played as the best-of-19 frames matches, held over two sessions. The defending champion Ronnie O'Sullivan's opening match against Drew Henry was delayed for 25 minutes due to a problem with the scoreboard. The first six frames were shared, but from 3–3 O'Sullivan won six in a row to lead 9–3, and won the match at 10–5. Quinten Hann became the first Australian player to reach the second round since Eddie Charlton in 1989. Hann, a WEPF World Eightball Championship winner, had smashed the pack of reds open when breaking off in the sixth frame, from which Paul Hunter made a 77 break and took the frame. An uncommon shot, commentator Dennis Taylor described it as "bordering on ungentlemanly conduct". Hunter was 6–3 ahead after their first session, but Hann won the match 10–9. Seven-time winner Stephen Hendry recorded a break of 130 in frame three of his match with Shaun Murphy and led 6–3 at the end of their first session. He won the last frame with a break of 111 as he completed a 10–4 victory. Stuart Bingham narrowly missed out on a maximum break during his match against Ken Doherty, failing to pot the pink ball. Doherty later won the match 10–8.

James Wattana won only one frame of his match against John Higgins. Higgins made breaks of 109, 136 and 116 in winning 10–1. Peter Ebdon led Michael Judge 5–4 at the end of their first session then took five frames in a row to win 10–4. Dominic Dale, who had been ill with food poisoning in the days before his match with Jimmy White, accused White of making a push shot, pretended to go to sleep in his chair during the final frame, and after losing 2–10, snapped his own cue stick and threw it out of his dressing-room window. This match and the contest between Hunter and Hann which were being played simultaneously, were interrupted by a streaker wearing a Sven-Göran Eriksson mask.

=== Second round ===
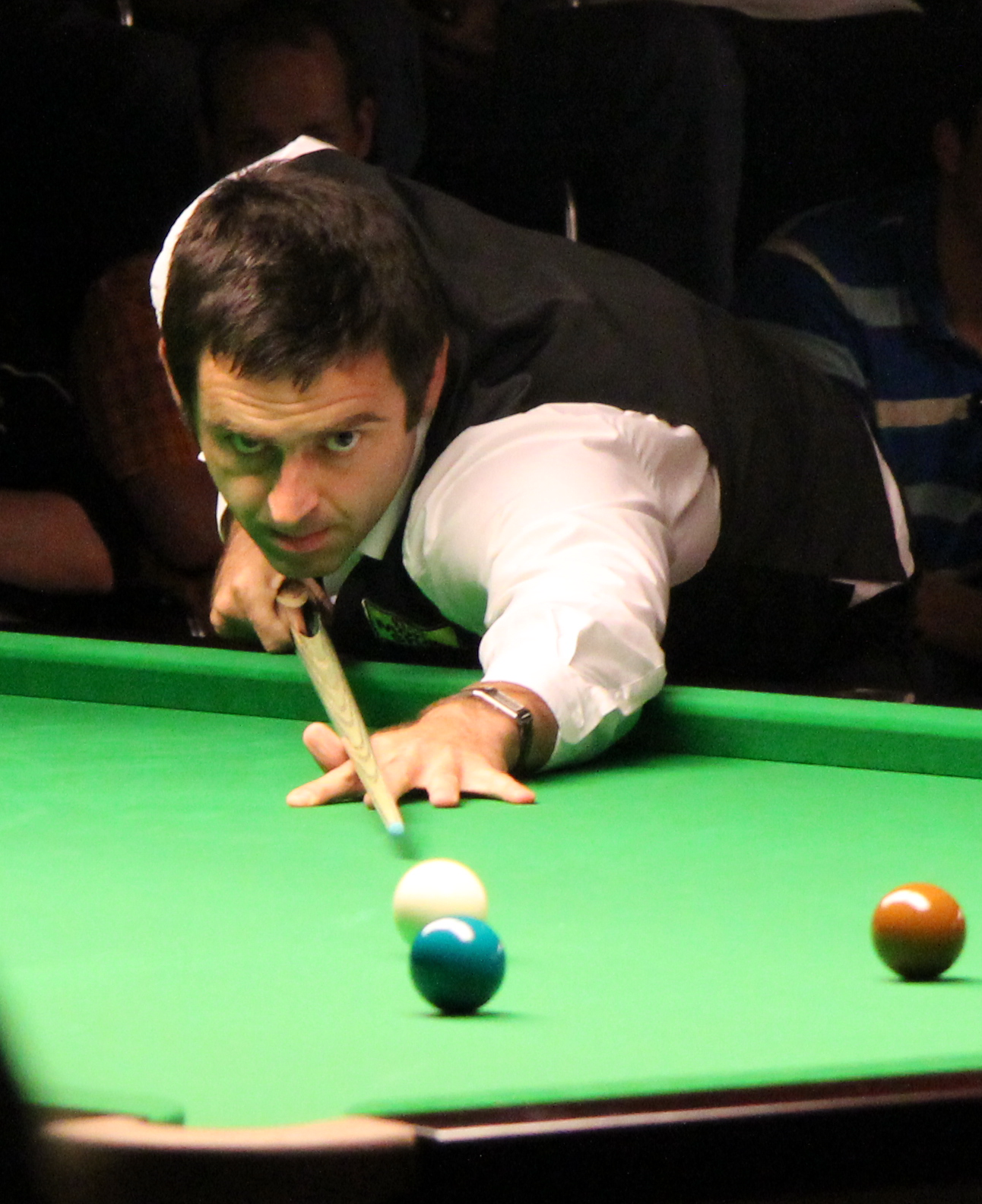
Defending champion Ronnie O'Sullivan (pictured in 2011) won his second-round match with a session to spare.

The second round featured matches played as the best-of-25 frames held over up to three sessions. O'Sullivan defeated Robert Milkins 13–2 in only two sessions. When the third session was scheduled to be played O'Sullivan visited a chiropractor. O'Sullivan said "I've got an imbalance in my body and I find it hard to walk, among other things." Hann smashed the pack of reds on the break-off shot four times during his 3–13 loss to Stephen Lee. Lee commented after the match "I don't know why Quinten [Hann] plays like that... perhaps he actually wants to go home early?" Qualifier Anthony Davies trailed 2–6 after the first session, and won just one frame in the second session as he was defeated 3–13 by Hendry. Doherty won eight frames in a row to go from 3–7 behind to 11–7 ahead against Mark King. King forced the match to a decider, which was won by Doherty 13–12. Higgins notched up five century breaks and defeated Dott 13–2. Ebdon and Joe Perry shared the frames in their first session and tied 4–4. Ebdon won seven of the next eight frames to lead 11–5 after the second session, and later won 13–7.

White played Matthew Stevens and lost 3–13 with a session to spare. In the eighth and final frame in the first session, White had missed a pot on the black ball, and as the cue ball returned towards him, hit it with such force that both balls were both forced off the table. He issued an apology before resuming play the following day. World number one Mark Williams was defeated 9–13 by world number 19 Anthony Hamilton. Hamilton had been defeated by Williams in the final of the China Open earlier in the season, despite being ahead by three frames. He commented that he had been "shaking like a leaf" in making his match winning break but that the previous match spurred him to victory. Williams commented that, despite being ranked number one in the world, his performances were not good enough: "I'm sick with the way I performed. I don't enjoy playing that bad but I seem to play like that fairly often. I don't know what it is."

=== Quarter-finals ===
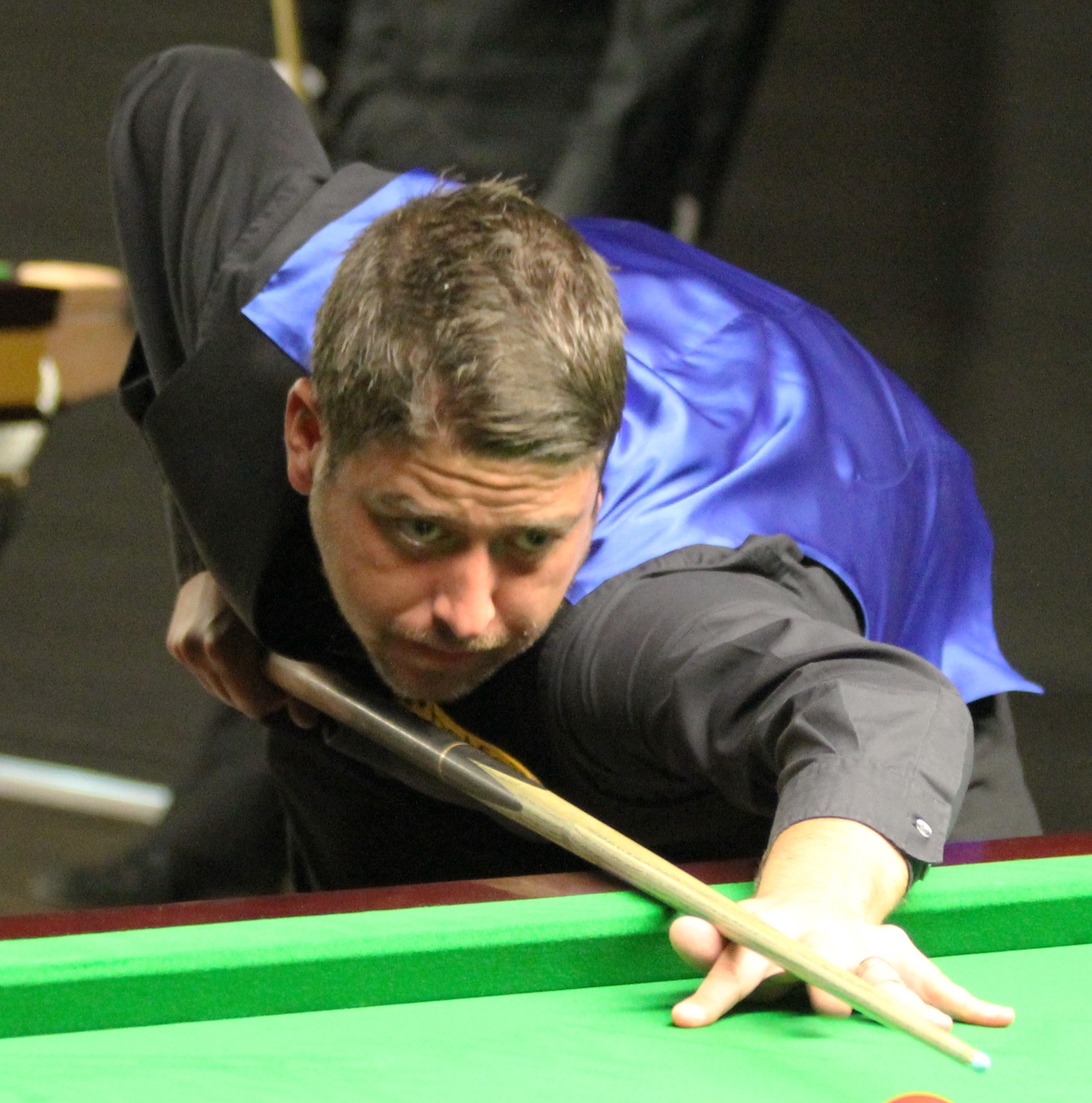
Matthew Stevens (pictured in 2012) reached his third semi-final in a row with a 13–7 win over John Higgins.

The quarter-finals were played as best-of-25 frames matches, held over three sessions. During his second session match again Lee, O'Sullivan missed a shot on the blue ball, throwing his cue stick in the air in frustration. He was unable to catch it, damaging the table, which had to be fixed before the next session. With the scores tied at 10-10, O'Sullivan made breaks of 83, 102 and 113 to win the match 13–10. Stephen Hendry and Ken Doherty were tied after the first session, Hendry winning four frames in a row to lead 8–4, but Doherty won the next four to tie at 8–8. With the match also tied at 12-12, Hendry made a break of 91 to win 13–12. Post-match, Hendry commented: "Ken and I always have brilliant matches, but this one was special".

John Higgins, who had only conceded three frames in his previous two matches, trailed 0–3 to Stevens in the quarter-finals. Higgins won four frames in a row, before Stevens tied the match at 4–4 in the first session. Stevens made the highest break of the championship, a 145 in frame 11, and held a four frame lead after the second session. Stevens won three of the next four frames to win 13–7 and reach his third successive semi-final. Ebdon reached the semi-finals for the second time, as he beat Hamilton 13–6. Ebdon commented that he preferred the longer frame matches and cited his physical condition as having prepared him well for the match.

=== Semi-finals ===
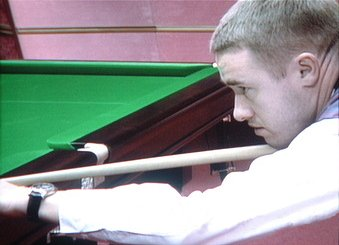
Stephen Hendry (pictured in 2003) defeated the defending champion Ronnie O'Sullivan 17–13 to reach his ninth World Championship final.

The semi-finals were played as best-of-33 frames matches, held over four sessions between 3 and 4 May. Before the match between O'Sullivan and Hendry, O'Sullivan made comments due to a dispute from their last meeting at the tournament, where Hendry accused O'Sullivan of playing a deliberate miss. He commented "the most satisfying thing for me to send Stephen Hendry back home to Scotland", and that "there is not a lot of respect there at all". He also made comments about Hendry's manager Ian Doyle, who was a previous manager to O'Sullivan. John Dee for the Daily Telegraph commented that O'Sullivan had "blown hot and cold" during interviews, and the comments surprised him. O'Sullivan experienced the Crucible curse as he lost 13–17 to Hendry. O'Sullivan had started the match with a break of 115 in the opening frame and led 5–3 at the end of the first session. In the second session, Hendry moved into a 9–7 lead, with breaks of 125, 122 and 124. The third session ended with the players tied at 12–12. In the final session Hendry took a 16–12 lead and went on to win 17–13.

In the other semi-final, Ebdon led Stevens 5–3 after the first session and then 9–7 after the second. It was all square after the third, at 12–12. Stevens moved within one frame of victory at 16–14. In frame 31, leading by 33 points, with 35 points remaining, Stevens lost position, and Ebdon cleared the table to win the frame. Ebdon made a 138 in the penultimate frame and won a deciding frame with a break of 55 to win the match 17–16. After the match, Ebdon commented that he "can't believe he won", and that he felt "sorry" for Stevens, because he knew "how he feels right now".

=== Final ===
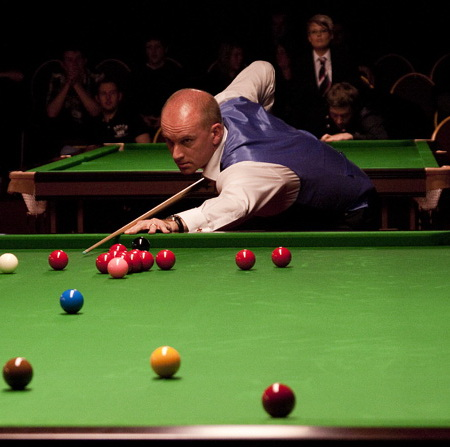
Peter Ebdon (pictured in 2010) won his only world title, defeating Stephen Hendry 18–17 in the final.

The final held between Ebdon and Hendry was played as a best-of-35 frames match over four sessions on 5 and 6 May. Ebdon (seeded seventh) and Hendry (fifth) had also competed in the 1996 final, Hendry winning 18–12 to gain his sixth world title. Over eight million viewers watched the 2002 final in the expectation of Hendry winning his eighth world title; many commentators also favoured Hendry to win the event again. The final was refereed by John Williams, his tenth final. Ebdon took the first four frames of the match to lead 4–0 at the first mid-session interval, but Hendry pulled back the next four frames to end the first session tied at 4–4. By the end of the second session, Ebdon was again four frames ahead at 10–6, and then took the first frame of the third session to lead 11–6, but Hendry fought back and levelled the score at 12–12 by the end of the third session.

Hendry made a strong start to the final session, taking the lead for the first time with breaks of 63, 55 and 38, to put him 14–12 ahead. Ebdon won the next two frames to draw level at 14–14, after Hendry missed a relatively simple red in the 28th frame. Hendry then compiled a break of 58 in frame 29, to lead 15–14, but Ebdon took three of the next four frames with breaks of 73, 111 and 85 to move ahead 17–16. Poised to win the championship, Ebdon was 52–27 up in frame 34 when he missed a straight pot on the black on its spot, allowing Hendry to clear the colours and level the match at 17–17.

This was the second time that Hendry had been taken to a deciding frame in the World Championship final, having also done so in 1994 when he defeated White 18–17. Hendry was the first to score in the decider, just seven points, before Ebdon compiled a break of 59. Then, with just four reds remaining on the table, Hendry potted the cue ball while attempting to play a snooker, giving Ebdon his chance to take the frame and win the match 18–17.

With his win, Ebdon received a cheque for £260,000 and moved up to third place in the end-of-season world rankings (behind O'Sullivan and Williams). In a post-match interview, he said "It's what I have been working for and dreaming about for the last 17 years... I wasn't ready to win it six years ago, but I've improved as a player and as a person". Hendry ultimately blamed his defeat on nerves and poor concentration, but also conceded that Ebdon was a stronger player than he had been in their previous world final encounter in 1996. This was Hendry's last appearance in a World Championship final, and he reached his last ranking final four years later at the 2006 UK Championship, where he again lost to Ebdon. The Guardian's Sean Ingle described the final as "one of the sporting highlights of the year."

== Main draw ==
Shown below are the results for each round. The numbers in parentheses beside some of the players are their seeding ranks. Players in bold denote match winners:

**First round** Best of 19 frames
20 April
(England) **Ronnie O'Sullivan (1)**	**10**
(Scotland) Drew Henry	5
24 April
(Republic of Ireland) Fergal O'Brien (16)	8
(England) **Robert Milkins**	**10**
23 April
(England) Paul Hunter (9)	9
(Australia) **Quinten Hann**	**10**
22 & 23 April
(England) **Stephen Lee (8)**	**10**
(Scotland) Chris Small	7
21 & 22 April
(Scotland) **Stephen Hendry (5)**	**10**
(England) Shaun Murphy	4
24 & 25 April
(Scotland) Alan McManus (12)	7
(Wales) **Anthony Davies**	**10**
20 & 21 April
(England) **Mark King (13)**	**10**
(England) David Gray	5
21 & 22 April
(Republic of Ireland) **Ken Doherty (4)**	**10**
(England) Stuart Bingham	8
24 & 25 April
(Scotland) **John Higgins (3)**	**10**
(Thailand) James Wattana	1
20 & 21 April
(Scotland) **Graeme Dott (14)**	**10**
(Finland) Robin Hull	6
22 & 23 April
(England) **Jimmy White (11)**	**10**
(Wales) Dominic Dale	2
20 & 21 April
(Wales) **Matthew Stevens (6)**	**10**
(England) Mike Dunn	6
22 April
(England) **Peter Ebdon (7)**	**10**
(Republic of Ireland) Michael Judge	4
20 & 21 April
(Northern Ireland) Joe Swail (10)	6
(England) **Joe Perry**	**10**
23 & 24 April
(England) Dave Harold (15)	6
(England) **Anthony Hamilton**	**10**
23 & 24 April
(Wales) **Mark Williams (2)**	**10**
(England) John Parrott	7

**Second round** Best of 25 frames
25 & 26 April
(England) **Ronnie O'Sullivan (1)**	**13**
(England) Robert Milkins	2
28 & 29 April
(Australia) Quinten Hann	3
(England) **Stephen Lee (8)**	**13**
27 & 28 April
(Scotland) **Stephen Hendry (5)**	**13**
(Wales) Anthony Davies	3
26 & 27 April
(England) Mark King (13)	12
(Republic of Ireland) **Ken Doherty (4)**	**13**
28 & 29 April
(Scotland) **John Higgins (3)**	**13**
(Scotland) Graeme Dott (14)	2
25 & 26 April
(England) Jimmy White (11)	3
(Wales) **Matthew Stevens (6)**	**13**
26 & 27 April
(England) **Peter Ebdon (7)**	**13**
(England) Joe Perry	7
27, 28 & 29 April
(England) **Anthony Hamilton**	**13**
(Wales) Mark Williams (2)	9

**Quarter-finals**; Best of 25 frames
30 April & 1 May
(England) **Ronnie O'Sullivan (1)**	**13**
(England) Stephen Lee (8)	10
30 April & 1 May
(Scotland) **Stephen Hendry (5)**	**13**
(Republic of Ireland) Ken Doherty (4)	12
30 April & 1 May
(Scotland) John Higgins (3)	7
(Wales) **Matthew Stevens (6)**	**13**
30 April & 1 May
(England) **Peter Ebdon (7)**	**13**
(England) Anthony Hamilton	6

**Semi-finals**; Best of 33 frames
2, 3 & 4 May
(England) Ronnie O'Sullivan (1)	13
(Scotland) **Stephen Hendry (5)**	**17**
2, 3 & 4 May
(Wales) Matthew Stevens (6)	16
(England) **Peter Ebdon (7)**	**17**

**Final**; Best of 35 frames
5 & 6 May
(Scotland) Stephen Hendry (5)	17
(England) **Peter Ebdon (7)**	**18**

**Final** (Best of 35 frames) Crucible Theatre, Sheffield. 5 & 6 May. Referee: John Williams.
Stephen Hendry (5)
Scotland
17–**18**
**Peter Ebdon (7)**
England
0–94, 0–140, 13–73, 16–71, **126**–0, **73**–40, **119**–4, **65**–36, 0–134, **67**–56, 9–68, 68–70, 14–77, 13–69, **70**–4, 33–89, 32–69, **126**–0, **108**–0, **66**–21, **89**–36, 43–67, **110**–0, **97**–0, **127**–1, **65**–58, 22–103, 26–62, **74**–30, 21–73, 0–111, **78**–39, 4–85, **62**–52, 14–72
Century breaks: 8
(Hendry 4, Ebdon 4)

Highest break by Hendry: 126
Highest break by Ebdon: 134

0–**94**, 0–**140**, 13–**73**, 16–**71**, 126–0, 73–40, 119–4, 65–36, 0–**134**, 67–56, 9–**68**, 68–**70**, 14–**77**, 13–**69**, 70–4, 33–**89**, 32–**69**, 126–0, 108–0, 66–21, 89–36, 43–**67**, 110–0, 97–0, 127–1, 65–58, 22–**103**, 26–**62**, 74–30, 21–**73**, 0–**111**, 78–39, 4–**85**, 62–52, 14–**72**
(England) **Peter Ebdon** wins the 2002 Embassy World Snooker Championship

== Qualifying ==
Following amateur pre-qualifying, seven rounds of qualifying were played at the Manhattan Club, Harrogate. After Harrogate there were a further five rounds of qualifying at Telford International Centre. The final qualifying round was held at Newport on 16 and 17 March 2002. Willie Thorne, in his 27th world championship, lost in the seventh round of amateur pre-qualifying to Stephen Croft. Thorne was the only entrant in the qualifiers to have played at the first Crucible finals in 1977. Three-times semi-finalist Tony Knowles lost 3–5 to Rob James in the third round. During her fifth-round defeat, Kelly Fisher became the first female player to compile a century break at the World Championship, making a 106.

=== Amateur pre-qualifying ===
Round 7 (Best of 9 frames)
(England) Darren Clarke	5–2	(England) Craig Harrison
(Wales) Ryan Day	5–3	(England) Karl Broughton
(England) Shailesh Jogia	5–0	(England) Shaun Mellish
(Wales) James Reynolds	5–1	(England) Malcolm Bilclough
(England) Jason Weston	5–1	(Wales) Tony Chappel
(England) Lee Spick	5–2	(England) John Whitty
(England) Martin Gould	5–2	(England) David Gilbert
(England) Stephen Croft	5–3	(England) Willie Thorne

=== Round 1 ===
The first round of qualifying took place in Telford as best-of-19 frames matches.

Best of 19 frames
(England) Darren Clarke	10–9	(England) Brian Salmon
(Wales) Ryan Day	10–5	(England) Ryan Michael
(England) Shailesh Jogia	10–3	(England) Wayne Cooper
(Wales) James Reynolds	10–9	(Australia) Neil Robertson
(England) Jason Weston	10–1	(Wales) Edward Davies
(England) Lee Spick	10–5	(Thailand) Atthasit Mahitthi
(England) Craig Butler	10–7	(England) Martin Gould
(England) Stephen Croft	10–9	(England) Sunit Vaswani

=== Round 2 ===
There were 32 players eliminated in the second round of qualifying. 1986 Champion Joe Johnson was 4–1 ahead of Ricky Walden but then lost a contact lens and, with impaired vision, ended the first session 4–5 behind. He went on to win 10–5.

Last 128 (best of 19 frames)
(England) Paul Wykes 10–4 (England) Darren Clarke	(England) Matthew Street 10–9 (England) Troy Shaw
(England) Barry Hawkins 10–8 (England) Luke Fisher	(England) Nick Pearce 10–8 (Thailand) Noppadol Sangnil
(Wales) Ryan Day 10–3 (Thailand) Phaitoon Phonbun	(England) Joe Johnson 10–5 (England) Ricky Walden
(England) Andrew Higginson 10–5 (England) Adrian Rosa	(England) Nick Walker 10–0 (Canada) Levi Meiller
(Northern Ireland) Jason Prince 10–7 (England) Chris Melling	(England) Wayne Brown 10–6 (England) Shailesh Jogia
(Wales) James Reynolds 10–9 (England) Tony Jones	(England) Jeff Cundy 10–7 (Norway) Kurt Maflin
(England) Paul Davison 10–6 (Scotland) Hugh Abernethy	(England) Antony Bolsover w/o–w/d (Belgium) Steve Lemmens
(Scotland) Martin Dziewialtowski 10–9 (Thailand) Kwan Poomjang	(England) Andrew Norman 10–5 (Thailand) Noppadon Noppachorn
(England) Jason Wallace 10–6 (Canada) Alain Robidoux	(England) Jason Weston 10–8 (England) Mark Gray
(England) Stephen Kershaw 10–8 (England) Sean Storey	(England) Lee Spick 10–7 (Wales) Philip Williams
(England) Matthew Couch 10–1 (New Zealand) Chris McBreen	(Iceland) Kristjan Helgason 10–7 (England) Surinder Gill
(Finland) Robin Hull 10–2 (England) Craig Butler	(England) Neal Foulds 10–4 (Malta) Alex Borg
(England) Mike Dunn 10–2 (England) Stephen Croft	(Republic of Ireland) David McDonnell 10–4 (England) Ian Hurdman
(England) Mark Selby 10–9 (England) Tom Ford	(Belgium) Bjorn Haneveer 10–5 (Wales) Ian Sargeant
(England) Shaun Murphy 10–5 (Scotland) Euan Henderson	(England) Adrian Gunnell 10–6 (England) Rory McLeod
(England) Barry Pinches 10–3 (England) Eddie Barker	(England) Luke Simmonds 10–6 (England) John Read

=== Round 3–6 ===
There were 16 players eliminated in each of rounds 3 to 6 of qualifying. Johnson experienced problems with his vision, as he had in the previous round, and retired from his third round match against Ryan Day when 1–5 behind. The final qualifying round saw John Parrott progress to the Crucible stage for the 19th consecutive year; six-times former champion Steve Davis failed to reach the Crucible for only the second time in 24 seasons. Murphy, ranked 169th and aged 19, was both the lowest-ranked and youngest player to reach the final stages in 2002.

Round 3 (last 96) (Best of 19 frames)	Round 4 (last 80) (Best of 19 frames)	Round 5 (last 64) (Best of 19 frames)	Final qualifying round (last 48) (Best of 19 frames)
(Iceland) Kristján Helgason 10–9 (England) Matthew Couch	(Iceland) Kristján Helgason 10–5 (England) Rod Lawler	(England) Stuart Bingham 10–7 (Iceland) Kristján Helgason	(England) Stuart Bingham 10–6 (England) Nigel Bond
(England) Paul Wykes 10–5 (England) Matthew Street	(England) Paul Wykes 10–4 (England) Peter Lines	(England) Paul Wykes 10–8 (England) Bradley Jones	(Wales) Dominic Dale 10–5 (England) Paul Wykes
(Wales) Ryan Day 5–1 (England) Joe Johnson (Johnson retired)	(Wales) Ryan Day 10–8 (England) Mark Davis	(Scotland) Marcus Campbell 10–9 (Wales) Ryan Day	(Wales) Anthony Davies 10–9 (Scotland) Marcus Campbell
(England) Mike Dunn 10–8 (Republic of Ireland) David McDonnell	(England) Mike Dunn 10–2 (Wales) Lee Walker	(England) Mike Dunn 10–5 (England) David Finbow	(England) Mike Dunn 10–9 (Scotland) Billy Snaddon
(England) Mark Selby 10–8 (Belgium) Bjorn Haneveer	(England) Mark Selby 10–6 (England) Jason Ferguson	(England) Mark Selby 10–6 (England) Alfie Burden	(England) David Gray 10–7 (England) Mark Selby
(England) Jason Weston 10–2 (England) Jason Wallace	(England) Ali Carter 10–4 (England) Jason Weston	(Wales) Darren Morgan 10–7 (England) Ali Carter	(England) Anthony Hamilton 10–7 (Wales) Darren Morgan
(Wales) James Reynolds 10–6 (England) Jeff Cundy	(Northern Ireland) Gerard Greene 10–7 (Wales) James Reynolds	(England) Michael Holt 10–7 (Northern Ireland) Gerard Greene	(Australia) Quinten Hann 10–6 (England) Michael Holt
(Northern Ireland) Jason Prince 10–9 (England) Wayne Brown	(England) David Roe 10–2 (Northern Ireland) Jason Prince	(England) David Roe 10–3 (England) Jimmy Michie	(Scotland) Drew Henry 10–5 (England) David Roe
(Finland) Robin Hull 10–1 (England) Neal Foulds	(Finland) Robin Hull 10–5 (England) Gary Ponting	(Finland) Robin Hull 10–6 (England) Gary Wilkinson	(Finland) Robin Hull 10–8 (England) Steve Davis
(England) Barry Hawkins 10–5 (England) Nick Pearce	(England) Stuart Pettman 10–6 (England) Barry Hawkins	(England) Stuart Pettman 10–5 (England) Brian Morgan	(Republic of Ireland) Michael Judge 10–9 (England) Stuart Pettman
(England) Anthony Bolsover 10–3 (England) Paul Davison	(England) Robert Milkins 10–7 (England) Anthony Bolsover	(England) Robert Milkins 10–3 (England) Andy Hicks	(England) Robert Milkins 10–8 (Malta) Tony Drago
(England) Shaun Murphy 10–5 (England) Adrian Gunnell	(England) Shaun Murphy 10–7 (England) Nick Dyson	(England) Shaun Murphy 10–5 (Scotland) Jamie Burnett	(England) Shaun Murphy 10–4 (Hong Kong) Marco Fu
(England) Nick Walker 10–6 (England) Andrew Higginson	(England) Jonathan Birch 10–7 (England) Nick Walker	(Pakistan) Shokat Ali 10–6 (England) Jonathan Birch	(England) John Parrott 10–9 (Pakistan) Shokat Ali
(England) Barry Pinches 10–5 Luke Simmonds	(England) Barry Pinches 10–7 (Scotland) Stephen Maguire	(Northern Ireland) Terry Murphy 10–9 (England) Barry Pinches	(England) Joe Perry 10–9 (Northern Ireland) Terry Murphy
(England) Stephen Kershaw 10–7 (England) Lee Spick	(Wales) Paul Davies 10–5 (England) Stephen Kershaw	(Wales) Paul Davies 10–5 (Northern Ireland) Patrick Wallace	(Scotland) Chris Small 10–7 (Wales) Paul Davies
(England) Andrew Norman 10–7 (Scotland) Martin Dziewialtowski	(England) Andrew Norman 10–6 (England) Steve James	(England) Ian McCulloch 10–3 (England) Andrew Norman	(Thailand) James Wattana 10–7 (England) Ian McCulloch

== Century breaks ==
There were 68 century breaks in the main stages of the event, which was at the time a record total. It was equalled in 2007 and superseded in 2009. The highest break of the tournament was 145, made by Matthew Stevens during his quarter-final match against Higgins. Hendry's 16 century breaks made during the tournament bettered the previous record total of 14 set by John Higgins in 1998.

- 145, 135, 113, 105, 105, 105, 101 – Matthew Stevens
- 141, 134, 132, 130, 126, 126, 125, 124, 122, 116, 113, 113, 111, 108, 104, 100 – Stephen Hendry
- 138, 134, 127, 111, 108, 103, 102, 101, 100, 100 – Peter Ebdon
- 136, 124, 116, 112, 109, 107, 105, 101 – John Higgins
- 136, 119 – Stephen Lee
- 135, 101 – Dave Harold
- 134, 109 – Stuart Bingham
- 134, 109, 100 – Joe Perry
- 134 – Alan McManus
- 132, 129, 115, 115, 113, 110, 110, 102 – Ronnie O'Sullivan
- 120, 117, 106, 105 – Ken Doherty
- 109, 106 – Anthony Hamilton
- 107 – Drew Henry
- 102 – Michael Judge
- 101 – Paul Hunter
