= 2005 Malta Cup =

Tournament information
- Dates: 31 January – 6 February 2005
- Venue: Hilton Conference Centre
- City: Portomaso
- Country: Malta
- Organisation: WPBSA
- Format: Ranking event
- Total prize fund: £200,000
- Winner's share: £30,000
- Highest break: John Higgins (SCO) (141)

Final
- Champion: Stephen Hendry (SCO)
- Runner-up: Graeme Dott (SCO)
- Score: 9–7

The 2005 Malta Cup was a professional ranking snooker tournament that took place from 31 January to 6 February 2005 at the Hilton Conference Centre in Portomaso, Malta.

Stephen Hendry won in the final 9–7 against Graeme Dott. This was the 36th and final ranking event he won in his 27-year professional career.

== Prize fund ==
The breakdown of prize money for this year is shown below:

- Winner: £30,000
- Runner-up: £15,000
- Semi-final: £7,500
- Quarter-final: £5,600
- Last 16: £4,000
- Last 32: £2,500
- Last 48: £1,625
- Last 64: £1,100
- Highest break: £2,000
- Maximum break: £20,000
- Total: £200,000

== Wildcard round ==
Match		Score	
WC1	(England) Tom Ford	5–1	(Malta) Joe Grech
WC2	(England) Mike Dunn	5–0	(Malta) Simon Zammit
WC3	(Australia) Neil Robertson	5–1	(Malta) Duncan Bezzina
WC4	(England) Adrian Gunnell	5–3	(Malta) Alex Borg

== Main draw ==
Round 1 Best of 9 frames
1	(Scotland) Stephen Maguire	5
(Northern Ireland) Joe Swail	4
11	(Scotland) Alan McManus	5
(England) Barry Pinches	4
15	(England) David Gray	0
(England) Mike Dunn	5
7	(Wales) Matthew Stevens	5
(England) Shaun Murphy	4
8	(Republic of Ireland) Ken Doherty	5
(Wales) Ryan Day	2
13	(Scotland) Chris Small	0
(England) Tom Ford	5
10	(England) Stephen Lee	2
(England) Anthony Hamilton	5
4	(Scotland) Stephen Hendry	5
(England) Barry Hawkins	1
3	(Wales) Mark Williams	1
(Australia) Neil Robertson	5
12	(England) Jimmy White	5
(England) Robert Milkins	3
9	(England) Peter Ebdon	5
(England) Michael Holt	1
6	(Scotland) John Higgins	5
(Scotland) Drew Henry	4
5	(England) Paul Hunter	3
(England) Stuart Pettman	5
14	(England) Steve Davis	5
(Scotland) Jamie Burnett	3
16	(Scotland) Graeme Dott	5
(England) Adrian Gunnell	1
2	(England) Ronnie O'Sullivan	w/o
(Australia) Quinten Hann (Note: Quinten Hann withdrew from the event with a broken finger.)	w/d

Last 16; Best of 9 frames
1	(Scotland) Stephen Maguire	3
11	(Scotland) Alan McManus	5
(England) Mike Dunn	3
7	(Wales) Matthew Stevens	5
8	(Republic of Ireland) Ken Doherty	2
(England) Tom Ford	5
(England) Anthony Hamilton	1
4	(Scotland) Stephen Hendry	5
(Australia) Neil Robertson	5
12	(England) Jimmy White	2
9	(England) Peter Ebdon	2
6	(Scotland) John Higgins	5
(England) Stuart Pettman	3
14	(England) Steve Davis	5
16	(Scotland) Graeme Dott	5
2	(England) Ronnie O'Sullivan (Note: O'Sullivan conceded frame three when leading 26–0.)	0

Quarter-finals; Best of 9 frames
11	(Scotland) Alan McManus	2
7	(Wales) Matthew Stevens	5
(England) Tom Ford	1
4	(Scotland) Stephen Hendry	5
(Australia) Neil Robertson	2
4	(Scotland) John Higgins	5
14	(England) Steve Davis	1
16	(Scotland) Graeme Dott	5

Semi-finals; Best of 11 fames
7	(Wales) Matthew Stevens	3
4	(Scotland) Stephen Hendry	6
6	(Scotland) John Higgins	5
16	(Scotland) Graeme Dott	6

Final; Best of 17 frames
4	(Scotland) Stephen Hendry	9
16	(Scotland) Graeme Dott	7

== Final ==
Final: Best of 17 frames. Referee: Eirian Williams. Hilton Conference Centre, Portomaso, Malta, 6 February 2005.
Stephen Hendry (4); Scotland	9–7	Graeme Dott (16); Scotland
Afternoon: 92–0 (92), 114–0 (114), 39–70 (56), 0–73 (73), 102–7 (101), 1–71 (64), 75–40, 0–93 (93); Evening: 109–0 (101), 80–0 (79), 81–0 (81), 24–81 (53), 0–84 (83), 24–67 (59), 61–9, 72–54
114	Highest break	93
3	Century breaks	0
6	50+ breaks	7

== Qualifying ==
Qualifying for the tournament took place between 30 November and 3 December 2004 at Pontins in Prestatyn, Wales.

Round 1 Best of 9 frames
(Wales) Paul Davies	4
(England) David McDonnell	5
(England) Paul Wykes	5
(England) Steve James	4
(Republic of Ireland) Leo Fernandez	5
(England) Ben Woollaston	3
(England) Ricky Walden	2
(Scotland) Hugh Abernethy	5
(England) Andrew Norman	3
(England) Joe Jogia	5
(England) Tom Ford	5
(England) Gary Wilson	2
(England) Alfie Burden	5
(England) Paul Davison	4
(England) Craig Butler	5
(England) Brian Salmon	3
(Wales) Darren Morgan	5
(England) Mark Gray	3
(England) Simon Bedford	5
(China) Liu Song	3
(England) Rory McLeod	5
(Northern Ireland) Sean O'Neill	0
(China) Ding Junhui	w/o
(Netherlands) Stefan Mazrocis	w/d
(Pakistan) Shokat Ali	5
(England) Mike Hallett	3
(Scotland) Scott MacKenzie	5
(England) David Hall	0
(Republic of Ireland) Rodney Goggins	5
(England) Adam Davies	4
(Republic of Ireland) Joe Delaney	5
(China) Jin Long	1

Round 2 Best of 9 frames
(England) Jonathan Birch	1
(England) David McDonnell	5
(England) David Roe	3
(England) Paul Wykes	5
(England) Mike Dunn	5
(Republic of Ireland) Leo Fernandez	1
(Wales) Anthony Davies	5
(Scotland) Hugh Abernethy	4
(Belgium) Bjorn Haneveer	3
(England) Joe Jogia	5
(England) Nick Walker	3
(England) Tom Ford	5
(England) Andy Hicks	5
(England) Alfie Burden	0
(England) Jimmy Michie	5
(England) Craig Butler	0
(Australia) Neil Robertson	5
(Wales) Darren Morgan	0
(Scotland) Marcus Campbell	5
(England) Simon Bedford	1
(Wales) Lee Walker	0
(England) Rory McLeod	5
(England) Sean Storey	5
(China) Ding Junhui	4
(England) Gary Wilkinson	1
(Pakistan) Shokat Ali	5
(Scotland) Jamie Burnett	5
(Scotland) Scott MacKenzie	2
(England) Adrian Gunnell	5
(Republic of Ireland) Rodney Goggins	3
(England) Rod Lawler	2
(Republic of Ireland) Joe Delaney	5

Round 3 Best of 9 frames
(England) Mark Davis	5
(England) David McDonnell	4
(Northern Ireland) Patrick Wallace	4
(England) Paul Wykes	5
(Republic of Ireland) Michael Judge	1
(England) Mike Dunn	5
(England) Shaun Murphy	5
(Wales) Anthony Davies	1
(Wales) Ryan Day	5
(England) Joe Jogia	2
(England) Dave Harold	3
(England) Tom Ford	5
(England) Stuart Bingham	4
(England) Andy Hicks	5
(England) Barry Hawkins	5
(England) Jimmy Michie	1
(Republic of Ireland) Fergal O'Brien	4
(Australia) Neil Robertson	5
(Finland) Robin Hull	5
(Scotland) Marcus Campbell	4
(England) Brian Morgan	4
(England) Rory McLeod	5
(England) Nigel Bond	5
(England) Sean Storey	3
(England) Stuart Pettman	5
(Pakistan) Shokat Ali	1
(England) Nick Dyson	4
(Scotland) Jamie Burnett	5
(England) Mark Selby	3
(England) Adrian Gunnell	5
(Thailand) James Wattana	5
(Republic of Ireland) Joe Delaney	4

Round 4 Best of 9 frames
(Northern Ireland) Joe Swail	5
(England) Mark Davis	3
(England) Barry Pinches	5
(England) Paul Wykes	2
(Hong Kong) Marco Fu	4
(England) Mike Dunn	5
(Northern Ireland) Gerard Greene	2
(England) Shaun Murphy	5
(England) Ali Carter	3
(Wales) Ryan Day	5
(Malta) Tony Drago (Note: Match was held over to the venue in Malta)	4
(England) Tom Ford	5
(England) Anthony Hamilton	5
(England) Andy Hicks	3
(England) Ian McCulloch	4
(England) Barry Hawkins	5
(England) Joe Perry	3
(Australia) Neil Robertson	5
(England) Robert Milkins	5
(Finland) Robin Hull	2
(England) Michael Holt	5
(England) Rory McLeod	2
(Scotland) Drew Henry	5
(England) Nigel Bond	3
(England) John Parrott	0
(England) Stuart Pettman	5
(Wales) Dominic Dale	1
(Scotland) Jamie Burnett	5
(England) Mark King	1
(England) Adrian Gunnell	5
(Australia) Quinten Hann	5
(Thailand) James Wattana	4

== Century breaks ==
=== Qualifying stage centuries ===
- 141 – Barry Hawkins
- 134 – Joe Perry
- 133 – Patrick Wallace
- 132 – Jimmy Michie
- 128 – Michael Holt
- 127, 110 – Shaun Murphy
- 126, 116, 107 – Neil Robertson
- 126 – Rory McLeod
- 124 – Anthony Davies
- 122 – Barry Pinches
- 121 – Marcus Campbell
- 119 – Andrew Norman
- 117 – Nick Dyson
- 115 – Ryan Day
- 114 – Tom Ford
- 102 – Nigel Bond

=== Televised stage centuries ===
- 141, 117, 104 – John Higgins
- 138, 130, 114, 108, 103, 101, 101, 100 (Note: Stephen Hendrys 650th century break) – Stephen Hendry
- 136, 124 – Tom Ford
- 120 – Neil Robertson
- 114 – Shaun Murphy
- 114 – Graeme Dott
- 106 – Mike Dunn
- 106 – Barry Hawkins
