= 1997 Grand Prix (snooker) =

Grand Prix
Tournament information
- Dates: 14–26 October 1997
- Venue: Bournemouth International Centre
- City: Bournemouth
- Country: England
- Organisation: WPBSA
- Format: Ranking event
- Total prize fund: £350,000
- Winner's share: £60,000
- Highest break: Alfie Burden (ENG) (143)

Final
- Champion: Dominic Dale (WAL)
- Runner-up: John Higgins (SCO)
- Score: 9–6

The 1997 Grand Prix was a professional snooker tournament and the first of eight WPBSA ranking events in the 1997/1998 season, preceding the UK Championship. It was held from 14 to 26 October 1997 at the Bournemouth International Centre in Bournemouth, England.

Mark Williams was the defending champion, but he lost his last 32 match against Matthew Stevens. Dominic Dale won his first ranking title by defeating John Higgins 9–6 in the final.

== Tournament summary ==
Defending champion Mark Williams was the number 1 seed with World Champion Ken Doherty seeded 2. The remaining places were allocated to players based on the world rankings.

== Main draw ==
Last 64; Best of 9 frames
1	(Wales) Mark Williams	5
56	(Republic of Ireland) Michael Judge	2
24	(England) Steve James	1
53	(Wales) Matthew Stevens	5
32	(Scotland) Billy Snaddon	5
94	(England) Matthew Couch	4
15	(Wales) Darren Morgan	5
58	(Wales) Wayne Jones	4
16	(England) Stephen Lee	5
(England) Troy Shaw	4
27	(England) Martin Clark	1
43	(England) Paul Hunter	5
28	(England) Brian Morgan	5
(England) Peter McCullagh	0
6	(England) John Parrott	5
40	(Scotland) Drew Henry	1
7	(England) Ronnie O'Sullivan	5
80	(England) Bradley Jones	4
26	(England) Rod Lawler	3
86	(England) John Read	5
23	(Republic of Ireland) Fergal O'Brien	2
69	(England) Paul Wykes	5
11	(Malta) Tony Drago	5
44	(Scotland) Euan Henderson	2
12	(Thailand) James Wattana	5
106	(Republic of Ireland) Stephen O'Connor	4
20	(England) Mark King	5
(Scotland) Craig MacGillivray	2
22	(Northern Ireland) Joe Swail	2
104	(Australia) Quinten Hann	5
4	(Scotland) John Higgins	5
(England) Leigh Griffin	1
3	(Scotland) Stephen Hendry	3
38	(Scotland) Jamie Burnett	5
18	(England) Dave Harold	5
62	(Northern Ireland) Gerard Greene	3
19	(England) Andy Hicks	3
54	(Wales) Dominic Dale	5
13	(England) Steve Davis	5
90	(England) Peter Lines	3
9	(Canada) Alain Robidoux	1
48	(Wales) Paul Davies	5
25	(Scotland) Chris Small	5
34	(Northern Ireland) Dennis Taylor	0
17	(England) Gary Wilkinson	3
(England) Alfie Burden	5
8	(England) Nigel Bond	5
(England) David Gray	2
5	(England) Peter Ebdon	3
45	(England) Jonathan Birch	5
31	(England) Mick Price	5
61	(Wales) Anthony Davies	3
29	(Northern Ireland) Terry Murphy	5
76	(England) Ian McCulloch	0
14	(England) Anthony Hamilton	4
99	(England) Wayne Brown	5
10	(Scotland) Alan McManus	5
87	(England) Stuart Pettman	2
30	(England) Neal Foulds	1
49	(England) David Roe	5
21	(England) Jimmy White	5
37	(England) Jason Ferguson	0
2	(Republic of Ireland) Ken Doherty	4
36	(England) Willie Thorne	5

Last 32; Best of 9 frames
1	(Wales) Mark Williams	4
53	(Wales) Matthew Stevens	5
32	(Scotland) Billy Snaddon	5
15	(Wales) Darren Morgan	3
16	(England) Stephen Lee	1
43	(England) Paul Hunter	5
28	(England) Brian Morgan	0
6	(England) John Parrott	5
7	(England) Ronnie O'Sullivan	2
86	(England) John Read	5
69	(England) Paul Wykes	3
11	(Malta) Tony Drago	5
12	(Thailand) James Wattana	1
20	(England) Mark King	5
104	(Australia) Quinten Hann	4
4	(Scotland) John Higgins	5
38	(Scotland) Jamie Burnett	3
18	(England) Dave Harold	5
54	(Wales) Dominic Dale	5
13	(England) Steve Davis	2
48	(Wales) Paul Davies	2
25	(Scotland) Chris Small	5
(England) Alfie Burden	5
8	(England) Nigel Bond	3
45	(England) Jonathan Birch	4
31	(England) Mick Price	5
29	(Northern Ireland) Terry Murphy	4
99	(England) Wayne Brown	5
10	(Scotland) Alan McManus	5
49	(England) David Roe	1
21	(England) Jimmy White	5
36	(England) Willie Thorne	2

Last 16; Best of 9 frames
53	(Wales) Matthew Stevens	5
32	(Scotland) Billy Snaddon	4
43	(England) Paul Hunter	4
6	(England) John Parrott	5
86	(England) John Read	5
11	(Malta) Tony Drago	3
20	(England) Mark King	0
4	(Scotland) John Higgins	5
18	(England) Dave Harold	4
54	(Wales) Dominic Dale	5
25	(Scotland) Chris Small	5
(England) Alfie Burden	2
31	(England) Mick Price	5
99	(England) Wayne Brown	2
10	(Scotland) Alan McManus	1
21	(England) Jimmy White	5

Quarter-finals; Best of 9 frames
53	(Wales) Matthew Stevens	5
6	(England) John Parrott	4
86	(England) John Read	0
4	(Scotland) John Higgins	5
54	(Wales) Dominic Dale	5
25	(Scotland) Chris Small	2
31	(England) Mick Price	0
21	(England) Jimmy White	5

Semi-finals; Best of 11 frames
53	(Wales) Matthew Stevens	5
4	(Scotland) John Higgins	6
54	(Wales) Dominic Dale	6
21	(England) Jimmy White	2

Final; Best of 17 frames
4	(Scotland) John Higgins	6
54	(Wales) Dominic Dale	9

== Final ==
Final: Best of 17 frames. Referee: Colin Brinded. Bournemouth International Centre, Bournemouth, England, 26 October 1997.
John Higgins (4); Scotland	6–9	Dominic Dale (54); Wales
Afternoon: 0–73 (50), 44–57, 59–69, 17–78, 70–59 (61), 31–81, 77–1 (71), 98–0 (98); Evening: 104–0 (104), 0–89, 87–4, 53–67, 74–39, 6–120 (120), 9–71 (71)
104	Highest break	120
1	Century breaks	1
4	50+ breaks	3

== Qualifying ==
Round of 96 Best of 9 frames

(Republic of Ireland) Michael Judge 5–3 Darren Clarke (England)

(Wales) Matthew Stevens 5–3 Mark Gray (England)

(England) Matthew Couch 5–2 Joe Johnson (England)

(Wales) Wayne Jones 5–2 Martin Dziewialtowski (Scotland)

(England) Troy Shaw 5–3 Jimmy Michie (England)

(England) Paul Hunter 5–2 Gary Ponting (England)

(England) Peter McCullagh 5–4 Nick Pearce (England)

(Scotland) Drew Henry 5–3 Ian Brumby (England)

(England) Bradley Jones 5–2 Shokat Ali (Pakistan)

(England) John Read 5–3 Dean Reynolds (England)

(England) Paul Wykes 5–0 Karl Broughton (England)

(Scotland) Euan Henderson 5–1 Sean Storey (England)

(Republic of Ireland) Stephen O'Connor 5–3 Stefan Mazrocis (England)

(Scotland) Craig MacGillivray 5–4 Mark Davis (England)

(Australia) Quinten Hann 5–3 Mark Bennett (Wales)

(England) Leigh Griffin 5–3 Tony Jones (England)

(Scotland) Jamie Burnett 5–2 Lee Richardson (England)

(Northern Ireland) Gerard Greene 5–4 Joe Perry (England)

(Wales) Dominic Dale 5–1 Karl Burrows (England)

(England) Peter Lines 5–0 Tony Chappel (Wales)

(Wales) Paul Davies 5–2 Marcus Campbell (Scotland)

(Northern Ireland) Dennis Taylor 5–2 Jamie Woodman (England)

(England) Alfie Burden 5–2 Graeme Dott (Scotland)

(England) David Gray 5–4 Dave Finbow (England)

(England) Jonathan Birch 5–1 Steve Judd (England)

(Wales) Anthony Davies w/o–w/d Karl Payne (England)

(England) Ian McCulloch 5–3 Chris Scanlon (England)

(England) Wayne Brown 5–3 Jason Prince (Northern Ireland)

(England) Stuart Pettman 5–3 Dene O'Kane (New Zealand)

(England) David Roe 5–2 John Lardner (Scotland)

(England) Jason Ferguson 5–3 Lee Walker (Wales)

(England) Willie Thorne 5–4 Nick Walker (England)
