= Mike Dunn (snooker player) =

English snooker player

Michael Dunn
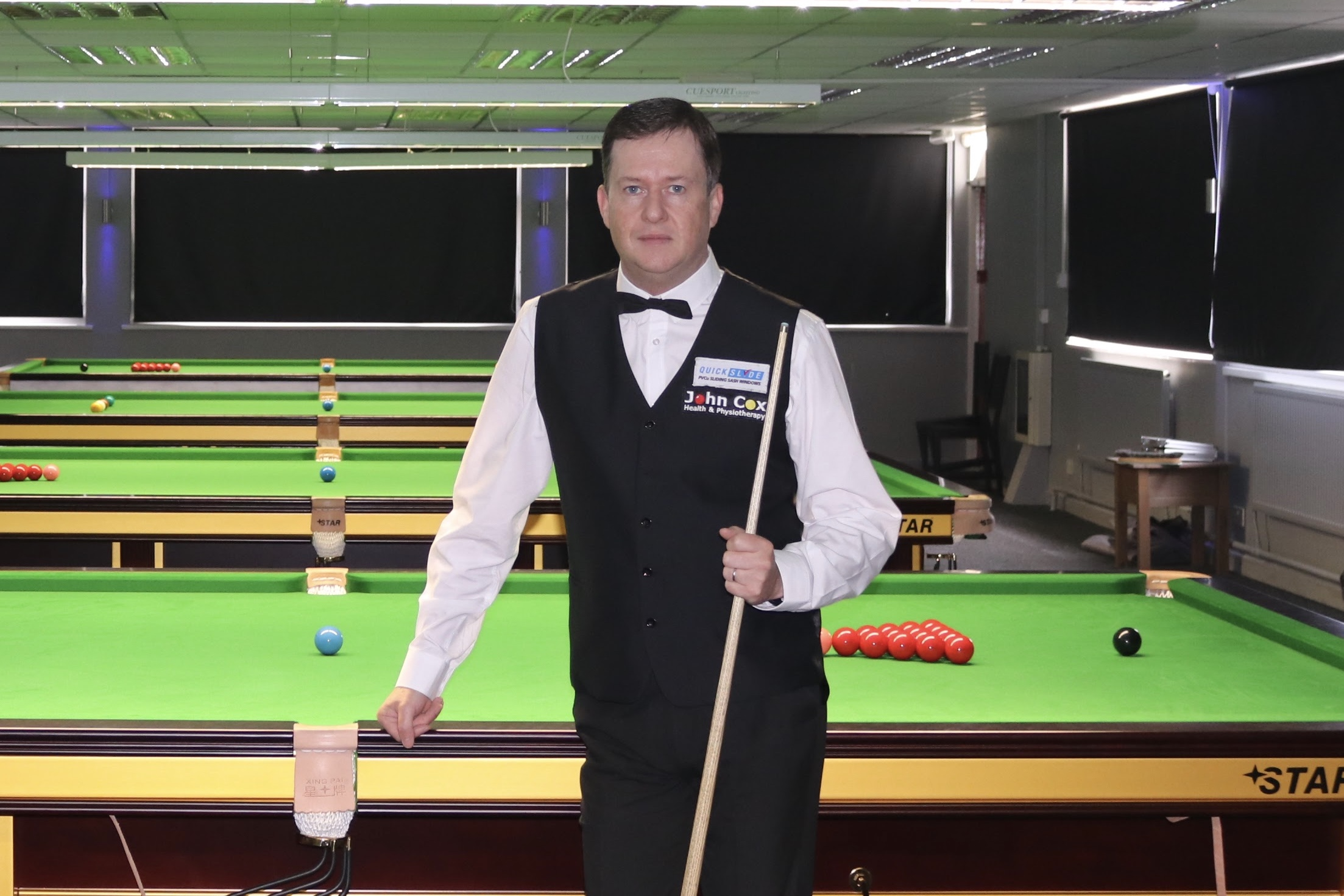
- Dunn at the 2014 Paul Hunter Classic

Personal information
- Born: 20 November 1971 (age 54) Middlesbrough, England

Sport
- Country: England
- Sport: Snooker
- Professional: 1991–1997, 1998–2020
- Highest ranking: 32 (October 2010)
- Maximum breaks: 1
- Best ranking finish: Semi-final (x1)

Mike Dunn (born 20 November 1971) is an English retired professional snooker player who lives in Redcar.

Having first turned professional in 1991, Dunn has been ranked within the top 64 players in the world since 2002, reaching his highest ranking, at 32nd, in October 2010. He has enjoyed the best form of his career since 2013, reaching the last 16 stage of three tournaments, and the semi-finals of the 2014 China Open and the 2015 Ruhr Open. He announced his retirement from the game after losing in the third qualifying round of the 2020 World Championship.

== Career ==
=== 1991 to 1997 ===
Born in 1971, Dunn turned professional in 1991. His first six seasons came without any success, and although he improved his ranking each year, he was relegated as the world number 139 in 1997, as the secondary UK Tour was formed to run below the professional main tour.

Competing on the UK Tour for the 1997/1998 season, Dunn reached the last 16 at Event Three, where he lost 2–5 to former world number two Tony Knowles. His performances that season were sufficient for him to regain his professional status at its conclusion.

=== Since 1998 ===
In his first season back on the main tour, Dunn reached the last 32 at the 1999 Welsh Open, where he beat five opponents, including Munraj Pal, Ian Brumby, Paul Wykes and Mark King, before being eliminated 5–1 by Alain Robidoux.

Beginning 1999/2000 ranked 134th, Dunn would enter the 2000s within the top 100 professional players; a run to the last 32 at the 2000 Thailand Masters, where Matthew Stevens beat him 5–1, contributed to £13,000 in prize money for that season, and he finished it in 93rd position.

Dunn's stock continued to rise steadily the following year, but his only showing in the latter stages of an event came at the 2001 Thailand Masters; there, he recovered from 1–3 down to 3–3 against Stephen Lee, but lost 3–5.

As the world number 72 for the 2001/2002 season, Dunn enjoyed his best form yet at the 2002 World Championship, defeating Stephen Croft 10–2, David McDonnell 10–8, Lee Walker 10–2, David Finbow 10–5 and Billy Snaddon 10–9 – having trailed 1–5 – to qualify for the main stages at the Crucible Theatre for the first time. Drawn against Stevens, he came to trail 1–7 and, although he recovered well to 6–9, could not prevent a 6–10 loss. Nevertheless, the performance earned Dunn £14,500, and he broke into the top 64 as a result.

The next few seasons were anticlimactic, Dunn's best progress being a run to the semi-final of the non-ranking Benson & Hedges Championship, where he lost 3–6 to Mehmet Husnu; however, 2005 heralded a first-ever last-16 finish, at the 2005 Malta Cup. There, he beat Leo Fernandez, Michael Judge, Marco Fu, local wildcard entry Simon Zammit and David Gray – whitewashing the latter 5–0 – before losing 3–5, again to Stevens. Having begun 2004/2005 ranked 53rd, Dunn finished it 54th – the first time he had ever finished a season in a lower position than at the start.

At the 2006 UK Championship, Dunn defeated Jamie Jones, Mark Davis and James Wattana to reach the last 32, but was heavily beaten by the resurgent Ken Doherty, losing 1–9 to the Irishman.

Doherty again overcame him at the China Open the following season, this time a 5–2 victor; Dunn came within one match of making his second Crucible appearance in 2008, but having led Dave Harold 4–3, went on to lose 4–10.

2008/2009 brought a run to the last 16 at the inaugural – and only – Bahrain Championship, where he beat Shaun Murphy 5–4 in the last 32, but lost by the same scoreline in his next match against Barry Hawkins.

After several last-64 finishes at the start of season 2010/2011, Dunn briefly entered the top 32 in the rankings in October 2010, but dropped back out within several months; he beat Stevens, Alfie Burden and Stuart Bingham in the 2011 Snooker Shoot-out, but lost his quarter-final 'match' 14–90 to Ronnie O'Sullivan.

By 2014, Dunn had endured several years of poor form and was in danger of losing his place on tour at the end of the season. However, at the 2014 China Open, he mustered the best performance of his career, beating Tom Ford, Peter Lines, Tian Pengfei, Craig Steadman and world number one Mark Selby to reach the semi-finals. There, he faced the home favourite, Ding Junhui, for a place in the final, but was outclassed, losing 6–0. This run earned Dunn £21,000 and was enough to ensure he would begin the 2014/2015 season ranked 58th, keeping his professional status.

The next season brought only one last-16 finish, at the 2014 Haining Open, where he lost 3–4 to the eventual finalist, Peter Lines's son Oliver, but Dunn's results were sufficient to move him up to 42nd in the end-of-season rankings, his highest position since 2011.

On 25 July 2020, Dunn announced his retirement from competitive snooker, ending his 29-year career as a professional.

== Personal life ==
Mike Dunn has been the manager of Q House Snooker Academy Darlington. He’s also served as WPBSA director for World Snooker, and was in the presentation party at the final of the 2007 UK Championship. Dunn supports Middlesbrough F.C.

== Performance and rankings timeline ==
Tournament	1991/ 92	1992/ 93	1993/ 94	1994/ 95	1995/ 96	1996/ 97	1997/ 98	1998/ 99	1999/ 00	2000/ 01	2001/ 02	2002/ 03	2003/ 04	2004/ 05	2005/ 06	2006/ 07	2007/ 08	2008/ 09	2009/ 10	2010/ 11	2011/ 12	2012/ 13	2013/ 14	2014/ 15	2015/ 16	2016/ 17	2017/ 18	2018/ 19	2019/ 20
Ranking (Note: From the 2010/2011 season it shows the ranking at the beginning of the season.)	(Note: New players on the Main Tour don't have a ranking.)	320	282	219	156	150	(Note: He was not on the Main Tour.)	(Note: New players on the Main Tour don't have a ranking.)	134	93	72	60	58	58	53	53	59	47	38	33	38	49	63	58	42	37	43	53	64
Ranking tournaments
Riga Masters (Note: The event was called the Riga Open (2014/2015–2015/2016))	Tournament Not Held																							MR		LQ	LQ	LQ	1R
International Championship	Tournament Not Held																					LQ	1R	1R	1R	1R	LQ	LQ	LQ
China Championship	Tournament Not Held																									NR	3R	1R	1R
English Open	Tournament Not Held																									1R	2R	1R	2R
World Open (Note: The event was called the Grand Prix (1991/1992–2000/2001 and 2004/2005–2009/2010), the LG Cup (2001/2002–2003/2004) and the Haikou World Open (2011/2012–2013/2014))	LQ	LQ	LQ	LQ	LQ	LQ	A	LQ	LQ	LQ	LQ	LQ	1R	1R	1R	LQ	LQ	LQ	LQ	1R	LQ	LQ	1R	Not Held		1R	1R	1R	LQ
Northern Ireland Open	Tournament Not Held																									1R	QF	1R	1R
UK Championship	LQ	LQ	LQ	LQ	LQ	LQ	A	LQ	LQ	LQ	LQ	LQ	LQ	LQ	LQ	LQ	LQ	LQ	1R	LQ	LQ	LQ	1R	2R	2R	2R	2R	2R	1R
Scottish Open (Note: The event was called the International Open (1992/1993–1996/1997) and the Players Championship (2003/2004))	NH	LQ	LQ	LQ	LQ	LQ	A	LQ	LQ	LQ	LQ	LQ	LQ	Tournament Not Held								MR	Not Held			3R	2R	2R	3R
European Masters (Note: The event was called the Irish Open (1998/1999) and Malta Cup (2004/2005–2007/2008))	LQ	LQ	LQ	LQ	LQ	LQ	NH	LQ	Not Held		LQ	LQ	LQ	2R	LQ	LQ	NR	Tournament Not Held								LQ	LQ	LQ	LQ
German Masters (Note: The event was called the German Open (1995/1996–1997/1998))	Tournament Not Held				LQ	LQ	A	NR	Tournament Not Held											LQ	LQ	1R	1R	WD	LQ	LQ	LQ	LQ	LQ
World Grand Prix	Tournament Not Held																							NR	DNQ	DNQ	DNQ	DNQ	DNQ
Welsh Open	LQ	LQ	LQ	LQ	LQ	LQ	A	2R	1R	2R	LQ	LQ	2R	LQ	LQ	LQ	LQ	1R	LQ	LQ	LQ	LQ	2R	1R	2R	2R	4R	3R	1R
Shoot-Out	Tournament Not Held																			Non-Ranking Event						1R	3R	3R	4R
Players Championship (Note: The event was called the Players Tour Championship Grand Finals (2010/2011–2012/2013) and the Players Championship Grand Final (2013/2014–2015/2016))	Tournament Not Held																			DNQ	DNQ	DNQ	DNQ	DNQ	QF	DNQ	DNQ	DNQ	DNQ
Gibraltar Open	Tournament Not Held																								MR	2R	1R	1R	WD
Tour Championship	Tournament Not Held																											DNQ	DNQ
World Championship	LQ	LQ	LQ	LQ	LQ	LQ	LQ	LQ	LQ	LQ	1R	LQ	LQ	LQ	LQ	LQ	LQ	LQ	LQ	LQ	LQ	LQ	LQ	LQ	LQ	LQ	LQ	LQ	LQ
Non-ranking tournaments
Six-red World Championship (Note: The event was called the Six-red Snooker International (2008/2009) and the Six-red World Grand Prix (2009/2010))	Tournament Not Held																	3R	A	A	NH	A	A	A	A	A	A	A	A
Haining Open	Tournament Not Held																							MR		A	A	4R	A
The Masters	WD	LQ	A	A	LQ	LQ	LQ	LQ	LQ	WD	LQ	LQ	LQ	A	A	A	A	A	A	A	A	A	A	A	A	A	A	A	A
World Seniors Championship	A	Tournament Not Held																		A	A	A	A	WD	LQ	A	A	A	A
Former ranking tournaments
Classic	LQ	Tournament Not Held																											
Strachan Open (Note: The event was called the Strachan Challenge (1992/1993–1993/1994))	LQ	MR	NR	Tournament Not Held																									
Dubai Classic (Note: The event was called the Thailand Classic (1995/1996) and the Asian Classic (1996/1997))	LQ	LQ	LQ	LQ	LQ	LQ	Tournament Not Held																						
Malta Grand Prix	Not Held			Non-Ranking Event					LQ	NR	Tournament Not Held																		
Thailand Masters (Note: The event was called the Asian Open (1991/1992–1992/1993) and the Thailand Open (1993/1994–1996/1997))	LQ	LQ	LQ	LQ	LQ	LQ	A	LQ	1R	1R	LQ	NR	Not Held			NR	Tournament Not Held												
British Open	LQ	LQ	LQ	LQ	LQ	LQ	A	LQ	LQ	LQ	LQ	LQ	LQ	1R	Tournament Not Held														
Irish Masters	Non-Ranking Event											LQ	LQ	LQ	NH	NR	Tournament Not Held												
Northern Ireland Trophy	Tournament Not Held														NR	2R	1R	1R	Tournament Not Held										
Bahrain Championship	Tournament Not Held																	2R	Tournament Not Held										
Wuxi Classic (Note: The event was called the Jiangsu Classic (2008/2009–2009/2010))	Tournament Not Held																	Non-Ranking Event				LQ	LQ	LQ	Tournament Not Held				
Australian Goldfields Open (Note: The event was called the Australian Open (1994/1995) and the Australian Masters (1995/1996))	Not Held			NR		Tournament Not Held															LQ	LQ	1R	LQ	LQ	Not Held			
Shanghai Masters	Tournament Not Held																WR	LQ	LQ	WR	LQ	LQ	1R	LQ	2R	LQ	LQ	Non-Rank.	
Paul Hunter Classic (Note: The event was called the Grand Prix Fürth (2004/2005) and the Fürth German Open (2005/2006–2006/2007))	Tournament Not Held													Pro-am Event						Minor-Ranking Event						A	3R	A	NR
Indian Open	Tournament Not Held																						3R	1R	NH	1R	1R	LQ	NH
China Open (Note: The event was called the China International (1997/1998–1998/1999))	Tournament Not Held						NR	LQ	LQ	LQ	LQ	Not Held		LQ	LQ	LQ	1R	LQ	1R	LQ	LQ	LQ	SF	2R	2R	2R	1R	LQ	NH
Former non-ranking tournaments
Shoot-Out	Tournament Not Held																			QF	2R	1R	1R	1R	1R	Ranking Event			

Performance Table Legend
LQ	lost in the qualifying draw	#R	lost in the early rounds of the tournament (WR = Wildcard round, RR = Round robin)	QF	lost in the quarter-finals
SF	lost in the semi-finals	F	lost in the final	W	won the tournament
DNQ	did not qualify for the tournament	A	did not participate in the tournament	WD	withdrew from the tournament
DQ	disqualified from the tournament				

NH / Not Held	event was not held.
NR / Non-Ranking Event	event is/was no longer a ranking event.
R / Ranking Event	event is/was a ranking event.
MR / Minor-Ranking Event	means an event is/was a minor-ranking event.
PA / Pro-am Event	means an event is/was a pro-am event.
