= Brian Salmon =

English snooker player

Personal information
- Born: 5 April 1978 (age 48)

Sport
- Country: England
- Sport: Snooker
- Professional: 2000–2002, 2004/2005
- Highest ranking: 87 (2004/2005)

Brian Salmon (born 5 April 1978) is an English former professional snooker player.

== Career ==
Salmon turned professional in 2000. During the 2001/2001 season, he reached the last 80 at the 2001 European Open, defeating former World Champion Joe Johnson 5–4 and Jeff Cundy 5–1 before losing 5–0 to Paul Davies.

After that season, Salmon did not play competitively until 2003; in the 2003/2004 season, he won an event on the Challenge Tour to regain his place on the professional tour. In Event 3, Salmon beat Steve Harrison, David Craggs, Tony Knowles, Dermot McGlinchey, David John and Mark Joyce, setting up an encounter in the final with Steve James, once the world number seven. Salmon made a break of 104 in a 6–2 victory over James, recording his first tournament win.

Having re-qualified as a professional for the 2004/2005 season, Salmon could not find any form in the ranking events; he won only one match, beating Scott MacKenzie 5–1 in the Irish Masters, and his hopes of progressing in the 2005 World Championship were ended by a 3–10 loss to Adrian Gunnell.

Ranked 87th, Salmon fell off the tour again and returned to the amateur game in 2005.

== Performance and rankings timeline ==
| Tournament | 1997/ 98 | 1998/ 99 | 1999/ 00 | 2000/ 01 | 2001/ 02 | 2003/ 04 | 2004/ 05 |
|---|---|---|---|---|---|---|---|
| Ranking | (Note: He was an amateur) | | | (Note: New players on the Main Tour don't have a ranking) | 209 | | |
Ranking tournaments
| Grand Prix (Note: The event was called the LG Cup (2001/2002, 2003/2004)) | A | A | A | A | LQ | A | LQ |
| British Open | A | A | A | A | LQ | A | LQ |
| UK Championship | A | A | A | A | LQ | A | LQ |
| Welsh Open | A | A | A | A | LQ | A | LQ |
| Malta Cup (Note: The event was called the Irish Open (1998/1999) and the European Open (2001/2002-2003/2004)) | NH | A | Not Held | | LQ | A | LQ |
| Irish Masters | Non-Ranking Event | | | | | A | LQ |
| China Open (Note: The event was called the China International (1997/1998-1998/1999)) | NR | A | A | A | LQ | NH | LQ |
| World Championship | LQ | LQ | LQ | A | LQ | LQ | LQ |
Non-ranking tournaments
| Merseyside Professional Championship | A | A | 2R | A | 1R | A | A |
| The Masters | LQ | A | A | LQ | LQ | LQ | A |
Former ranking tournaments
| Thailand Masters | A | A | A | A | LQ | Not Held | |
| Scottish Open (Note: The event was called the Players Championship (2003/2004)) | A | A | A | A | LQ | A | NH |

Performance table legend
| LQ | lost in the qualifying draw | #R | lost in the early rounds of the tournament (WR = Wildcard round, RR = Round robin) | QF | lost in the quarter-finals |
| SF | lost in the semi–finals | F | lost in the final | W | won the tournament |
| DNQ | did not qualify for the tournament | A | did not participate in the tournament | WD | withdrew from the tournament |

| NH / Not Held | means an event was not held. |
| NR / Non-Ranking Event | means an event is/was no longer a ranking event. |
| R / Ranking Event | means an event is/was a ranking event. |
| MR / Minor-Ranking Event | means an event is/was a minor-ranking event. |

== Career finals ==
=== Non-ranking event finals: 1 (1 title) ===
| Outcome | No. | Year | Championship | Opponent in the final | Score |
|---|---|---|---|---|---|
| Winner | 1. | 2004 | Challenge Tour - Event 3 | (England) Steve James | 6–2 |
