= Antony Bolsover =

English snooker player

Personal information
- Born: 3 November 1972 (age 53)

Sport
- Country: England
- Sport: Snooker
- Professional: 1991–1997, 1998–1999, 2000–2003
- Highest ranking: 68 (2002–2003)
- Best ranking finish: Last 16 (x2)

Antony Bolsover (born 3 November 1972) is an English former professional snooker player.

== Career ==
Bolsover turned professional in 1991, the highlights of his career coming during the next six years; he reached the last 16 of the British Open in 1994, and the Welsh Open in 1995.

After dropping off the tour in 1997, Bolsover spent several years competing either as an amateur or as a professional having regained his place. He reached a career-high ranking of 68th at the end of the 2001–2002 season, but lost his professional status once more in 2003.

Having failed in all of his attempts to requalify during the 2004–2005 season, Bolsover did not contest another event after the 2005 World Championship, defeating a young Aditya Mehta in his first qualifying match 5–2, but losing his second match by the same scoreline to Stuart Mann.

=== Non-Ranking Wins:(1) ===
- Merseyside Professional Championship – 1997
