= Colm Gilcreest =

Irish snooker player

Personal information
- Born: 7 May 1974 (age 52)

Sport
- Country: Ireland
- Sport: Snooker
- Professional: 1994–1997, 1998–2001, 2003/2004
- Highest ranking: 84

Colm Gilcreest (born 7 May 1974) is an Irish former professional snooker player, whose highest professional ranking was 84th.

== Career history ==
At the 2000 World Snooker Championship Gilcreest won six matches, against Philip Seaton, Simon Bedford, Robin Hull, Karl Burrows, Jimmy Michie and Stefan Mazrocis, to reach the final qualifying round, where he lost 6–10 to Billy Snaddon.

He reached the final of the 2008 World Amateur Snooker Championship in Wels, Austria where he lost 7–11 to Thepchaiya Un-Nooh.
