= Craig Butler (snooker player) =

English snooker player (born 1974)

Personal information
- Born: 30 April 1974 (age 52)

Sport
- Country: England
- Sport: Snooker
- Professional: 2000–2005
- Highest ranking: 71 (2004/2005)
- Best ranking finish: Last 32 (x1)

Craig Butler (born 30 April 1974) is an English former professional snooker player.

== Career ==
Born in 1974, Butler turned professional in 2000, after reaching the final of a tour qualifying event earlier that year.

In his first season, Butler reached the last 32 at the 2000 Benson & Hedges Championship, where he lost 2–5 to Lee Spick, and the last 64 at both the 2001 Scottish Open and the World Championship. In the former, Antony Bolsover defeated him 5–3; in the latter, he beat Ryan Day 10–9, Karl Broughton 10–7 and Lee Walker 10–6 before losing 7–10 to Bjorn Haneveer.

The following season heralded Butler's best performance in a ranking event; at the 2001 European Open, he beat Noppadon Noppachorn, Neal Foulds, Rod Lawler, Gary Wilkinson, Chris Small and Joe Grech - whitewashing Foulds 5–0 - before himself being beaten 0–5 by Alan McManus in the last 32.

The 2002/2003 season was lean for Butler, as he progressed only to the last 64 of one ranking tournament, the 2003 Welsh Open, where he lost 4–5 to Robert Milkins. His highest earning from one event came at the 2003 World Championship, where he defeated Ricky Walden and Munraj Pal, before losing 9–10 to Andy Hicks in the last 80; this brought Butler £5,700.

Although he was ranked 71st, a personal best, for the 2004/2005 season, Butler's form by this time was already declining. He made a break of 116 in losing 2–5 to Joe Jogia in the British Open, but won only two matches - 5–2 over Walker in the Welsh Open, and 5–3 against Brian Salmon in the Malta Cup.

Following his 3–5 defeat to Wilkinson in the 2005 China Open, and his withdrawal from that year's World Championship, Butler finished the season ranked 82nd, dropping off the tour and leaving the competitive game at the age of 31.
