= Wayne Brown (snooker player) =

English snooker player

Personal information
- Born: 21 October 1969 (age 56)

Sport
- Country: England
- Sport: Snooker
- Professional: 1994–2005
- Highest ranking: 69

Wayne Brown (born 21 October 1969) is an English former professional snooker player having played on the World Snooker Tour between 1994 and 2005. He later won the English Seniors national title in 2019, and the 2023 EBSA European 6-Red Snooker Championship. In October 2024, he reached the final of the EBSA Senior European Snooker Championship.

== Career ==
Brown beat Graeme Dott 7–3 to win the final of the 1994 Pontins Open having lost his previous final in the tournament against Mike Hallett in 1991.

Brown was a snooker professional on the World Snooker Tour between 1994 and 2005 and reached a career high world ranking of 69. He won matches against players such as Steve Davis and Jimmy White in his career, defeating Davis in 2001 to qualify for the 2001 Welsh Open, and White in the first round of the China Open in 1999. He made a high-break of 145 in November 2000 during the Benson & Hedges Championship against Joe Perry.

In 2019, as an amateur, Brown won the English Seniors Championship beating Stuart Watson 6–5 in the final. He had lost in the final of the previous year's competition to Shaun Wilkes.

In June 2023, he defeated compatriot Harvey Chandler 5-3 in the final of the 2023 EBSA European 6-Red Snooker Championship, held in Bulgaria. At the same venue that month he also finished third in the European Seniors 6 Reds Championships.

In October 2024, he was defeated by Craig Steadman in the final of the EBSA Senior European Snooker Championship having overcome Brendan O'Donoghue from the Republic of Ireland in the semi-final. He finished runner-up again at the 2026 EBSA Senior European Snooker Championship having played Belgian Kevin Hanssens in the final.

== Personal life ==
From St Helens, Lancashire, he was layer based in Warrington, Lancashire, he has played for Newton in the Warrington Snooker League and also worked in mental health care in a hospital in the city.

== Career finals ==
=== Pro-am finals: 2 (1 title) ===
Outcome	No.	Year	Championship	Opponent in the final	Score
Runner-up	1.	1991	Pontins Open	(England) Mike Hallett	7-5
Winner	1.	1994	Pontins Open	(Scotland) Graeme Dott	7–3

=== Amateur finals: 2 (1 title) ===
Outcome	No.	Year	Championship	Opponent in the final	Score
Runner-up	1.	2018	EASB English Seniors Championship	(England) Shaun Wilkes	6-2
Winner	1.	2019	EASB English Seniors Championship	(England) Stuart Watson	6-5
