= Nick Walker (snooker player) =

English snooker player

Personal information
- Born: 4 August 1973 (age 53) Chester, England

Sport
- Country: England
- Sport: Snooker
- Professional: 1991–2005
- Highest ranking: 54
- Best ranking finish: Last 16 (x3)

Nick Walker (born 4 August 1973) is an English former professional snooker player from Chester. He turned professional in 1991, and reached the last 16 of three world ranking events, including the 1999 World Snooker Championship.. He played 14 seasons as a professional, earning total prize money of £200,380, and retired to work in a bank in 2005.

His highest position in the snooker world rankings was 54th. He made 34 century breaks during his career, the highest of which was 144, at the 2002 Welsh Open.
