= Adrian Gunnell =

English snooker player

Personal information
- Born: 24 August 1972 (age 54) Telford, West Midlands, England

Sport
- Country: England
- Sport: Snooker
- Professional: 1994–1997, 1998–2012
- Highest ranking: 36 (2007–2009)
- Maximum breaks: 1
- Best ranking finish: Last 16 (x4)

Adrian Gunnell (born 24 August 1972) is an English former professional snooker player from Telford. He reached the last-16 in four world ranking events (three in Asia, in three different seasons, and at the 2008 Grand Prix).

While practising in 2003 he compiled three 147 breaks in four frames.

Victories he achieved during the 2007–08 season included beating Marco Fu 5–3 in last 48 of the Northern Ireland Trophy, and Matthew Stevens 9–7 at the same stage of the 2007 UK Championship from 5–7 behind, to qualify for the final stages of the event played in his home town for the first time. He lost to Peter Ebdon 5–2 and Ding Junhui 9–3 in the last 32 of both tournaments respectively, but his performances took him up to number 36 in the 2008/2009 rankings. At the 2008 Grand Prix, he defeated former World Champion Shaun Murphy 5–3 in the first round, then came from 0–3 down against Steve Davis to level at 3–3 and 4–4 and led by over forty points in the deciding frame, before Davis produced a clearance to the pink to snatch victory.

At the end of the 2011/12 season, he finished at 69th in the rankings, which as it was outside the top 64, meant that he lost his professional status.
