= Paul Wykes =

English snooker player

Personal information
- Born: 15 April 1971 (age 55) Bournemouth, England

Sport
- Country: England
- Sport: Snooker
- Professional: 1991–2007
- Highest ranking: 56 (1999–2001)
- Best ranking finish: Last 16 (x2)

Paul Wykes (born 15 April 1971 is an English former professional snooker player from Bournemouth, Dorset. He spent 16 years on the circuit and remained in the world's top 64 for 13 years.

== Career ==
Wykes turned professional in 1991 and achieved a career highest ranking of 56 in 1999, twice reaching the final qualifying round of the World Championship. He enjoyed victories over top players such as Paul Hunter, Joe Johnson, Neal Foulds and Willie Thorne, and in 1999 reached the last 16 of the UK Championship in his home town, Bournemouth, where Stephen Hendry made a 147 on the way to beating him 9–3.

In the 2000s, snooker took second place to his business interests and family, mostly due to the various financial cutbacks afflicting the game at the time. After winning just two matches during the 2006–07 season, Wykes fell to 95th place on the world rankings and decided to retire from snooker. "I thought I was off the tour last year and decided to carry on this season when I found out I was safe," he said. "Looking back, that was probably the wrong decision because I’ve just been going through the motions really."

He kept his WPBSA membership, and was thus eligible to enter the preliminary qualifying for the World Championship. He returned to action in 2010, defeating David Taylor and Les Dodd to get through to the first qualifying round, where he lost 6–10 to James Wattana. Wykes came back in 2013, the last year when non-tour professionals could enter the World Championship, following a victory in the local Dorset Open tournament and a family discussion: "It has always been a dream of mine to play at the Crucible. I know it is a long shot but I am going to give it my best." He beat Robin Hull and Lucky Vatnani before losing to Justin Astley. Wykes then entered Q School and came close to regaining his tour place in Event 2, where he went all the way to the quarter-finals, only to be whitewashed by Alexander Ursenbacher.
