= 2005 UK Championship =

Snooker tournament

2005 Travis Perkins UK Championship
Tournament information
- Dates: 5–18 December 2005
- Venue: Barbican Centre
- City: York
- Country: England
- Organisation: World Professional Billiards and Snooker Association
- Format: Ranking event
- Total prize fund: £500,000
- Winner's share: £70,000
- Highest break: Steve Davis (ENG); John Higgins (SCO); Michael Holt (ENG); (145)

Final
- Champion: Ding Junhui (CHN)
- Runner-up: Steve Davis (ENG)
- Score: 10–6

The 2005 UK Championship (officially the 2005 Travis Perkins UK Championship) was a professional snooker tournament and the 2005 edition of the UK Championship. It was held at the Barbican Centre in York, North Yorkshire, England from 5 to 18 December 2005. The competition was the second of six World Professional Billiards and Snooker Association ranking events in the 2005–06 snooker season, the first of the three Triple Crown events, and the tournament's 29th edition. It preceded the Malta Cup and followed the Grand Prix. It was broadcast in the United Kingdom and Europe on the BBC and Eurosport.

The defending champion was Stephen Maguire, who had won the previous year's event with a 10–1 win over David Gray in the final. Maguire reached the third round where he was defeated 8–9 by six-time world champion Steve Davis. Davis in turn was defeated 10–6 in the final by Ding Junhui, who won his second career ranking title. Ding was the first player from outside the British Isles to win the UK Championship, and the second youngest player to win it since Ronnie O'Sullivan triumphed in the 1993 competition. In the semi-finals Ding beat Joe Perry 9–4 and Davis defeated seven-time world champion Stephen Hendry 9–6. The tournament's highest break of 145 was shared by Davis, John Higgins and Michael Holt.

== Format ==
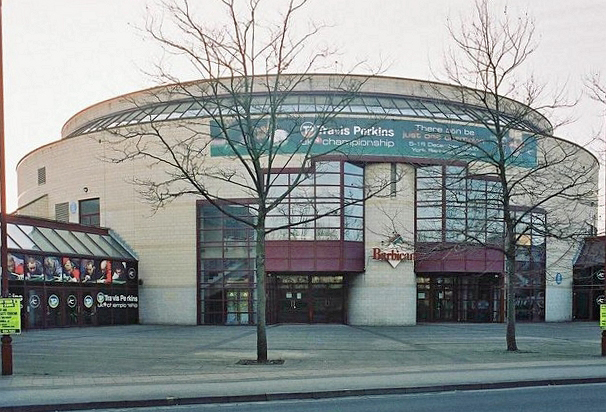
The Barbican Centre in York, where the tournament was held

The UK Championship tournament was created and first played as the United Kingdom Professional Snooker Championship in 1977 and was open to residents in the United Kingdom and holders of British passports. Seven years later all professional players were allowed to enter and snooker's governing body, the World Professional Billiards and Snooker Association (WPBSA), granted the tournament ranking status. It is considered to be snooker's second most important ranking tournament behind the World Snooker Championship and is one of three of the sport's Triple Crown events.

The 2005 event was held between 5 and 18 December at the Barbican Centre in York, North Yorkshire, England. It was the second of six WPBSA ranking events of the 2005–06 snooker season, following the Grand Prix and preceding the Malta Cup. Held in October, the Grand Prix was won by John Higgins who defeated his rival Ronnie O'Sullivan nine frames to two (9–2) in the final. The defending UK Champion was Stephen Maguire, who had defeated David Gray 10–1 in the previous year's final. The 2005 UK Championship was sponsored by builders' merchant and home improvement retailer Travis Perkins, and was broadcast by the BBC and Eurosport.

The tournament featured 48 participants with 16 seeded players, who were given a bye to the second round. The remaining 32 competitors were awarded by a three-round qualification tournament. The qualifying stage was played between players ranked 17 and those ranked lower for one of 16 places in the final stage between 31 October and 5 November at Pontin's Snooker Centre, Prestatyn, Wales. The matches were best-of-17 frames until the final. Ding Junhui, the China Open champion, beat Fergal O'Brien 9–4 in the third stage of qualifying. The other successful qualifiers included the likes of Ryan Day, Stuart Bingham and Mark Allen.

=== Prize fund ===
The tournament had a prize fund of £500,000, with £70,000 being awarded to the winner. Below is a breakdown of the prize money awarded.

- Winner: £70,000
- Runner-up: £35,000
- Semi-final: £17,500
- Quarter-final: £14,000
- Last 16: £10,500
- Last 32: £7,250
- Last 48: £4,125
- Last 64: £2,000
- Highest break: £6,000
- Maximum break: £25,000
- Total: £500,000

== Summary ==
=== Round 1 ===
The 16 first-round matches were between players ranked 17–32 and those who had made it through the qualifying stage. In this round Ian McCulloch lost 9–7 to Jamie Burnett in spite of the score tied at 4–4 at the first session's conclusion and him compiling breaks of 64, 71, 118, 52, 65 and 63. World number 18 Barry Pinches lost his match against Dominic Dale with a heavy 9–3 defeat, while Ali Carter beat Jamie Cope by the same scoreline, and Marco Fu won 9–6 over Michael Judge. Gerard Greene received a walkover to the next round after his opponent the world number 22 Quinten Hann failed to appear for the match and withdrew from the tournament for undisclosed reasons. Breaks of 84, 83, 74, 62 and 61 gave Ding a 5–3 advantage over Anthony Hamilton, and he won four successive frames in the game's second session to take a 9–3 win and progress to the second round. World amateur champion Allen claimed a 9–6 victory over 2004 UK Championship runner-up David Gray and Joe Swail won seven frames in a row en route to defeating Andy Hicks 9–3.

Michael Holt defeated Ricky Walden 9–8, a match in which Holt had a frame docked. He was warned by referee Patricia Murphy for conceding a frame too early in frame eight. Holt was further cautioned for "ungentlemanly conduct" when he was heard swearing seven frames later, leading Murphy to deduct a frame because he was warned twice. That put him 8–7 behind but he recovered with a 56 break in the final frame decider. After 1991 world champion John Parrott was defeated 9–5 by Mark Davis he admitted that winning another ranking event in his career was not possible. Neil Robertson achieved a break of 123 in him narrowly beating Rory McLeod 9–8, and world number 30 Barry Hawkins achieved breaks of 118 and 100 en route to a 9–5 win over Stuart Pettman. World number 37 Stuart Bingham, the winner of the Masters Qualifying Event in November, took a 9–4 victory against Robert Milkins with successive breaks of 95, 77 and 88, while Dave Harold lost 9–7 to Nigel Bond. A break of 133 helped James Wattana beat Drew Henry 9–4, and Mark King emerged a 9–4 winner over Ryan Day.

=== Round 2 ===
The winners of round one went through to face members of the top 16 in the second round. In this round world number 6 Paul Hunter, suffering from neuroendocrine tumours, won the deciding frame of his near seven-hour match over Burnett 9–8 on both the pink and black balls and Hunter received a standing ovation from the crowd. Higgins was tied 2–2 with Greene but he claimed seven of the next eight frames of the match that had a break of 145 in frame ten from Higgins who won 9–3. Fu came from 8–5 down against Ken Doherty to tie the match at 8–8 and force a final frame decider that Doherty won with a score of 9–8. At one point in his match eighth seed Peter Ebdon was equal 4–4 with Dale but he claimed five successive frames for a 9–4 success. After dominating Holt 7–1 with breaks of 110, 91, 73 and 64, number 10 seed and two-time world champion Mark Williams followed up with two of the next three frames to advance into the third round 9–2, after which he spoke of his relief that the win would prevent him from losing his top 32 world ranking status.

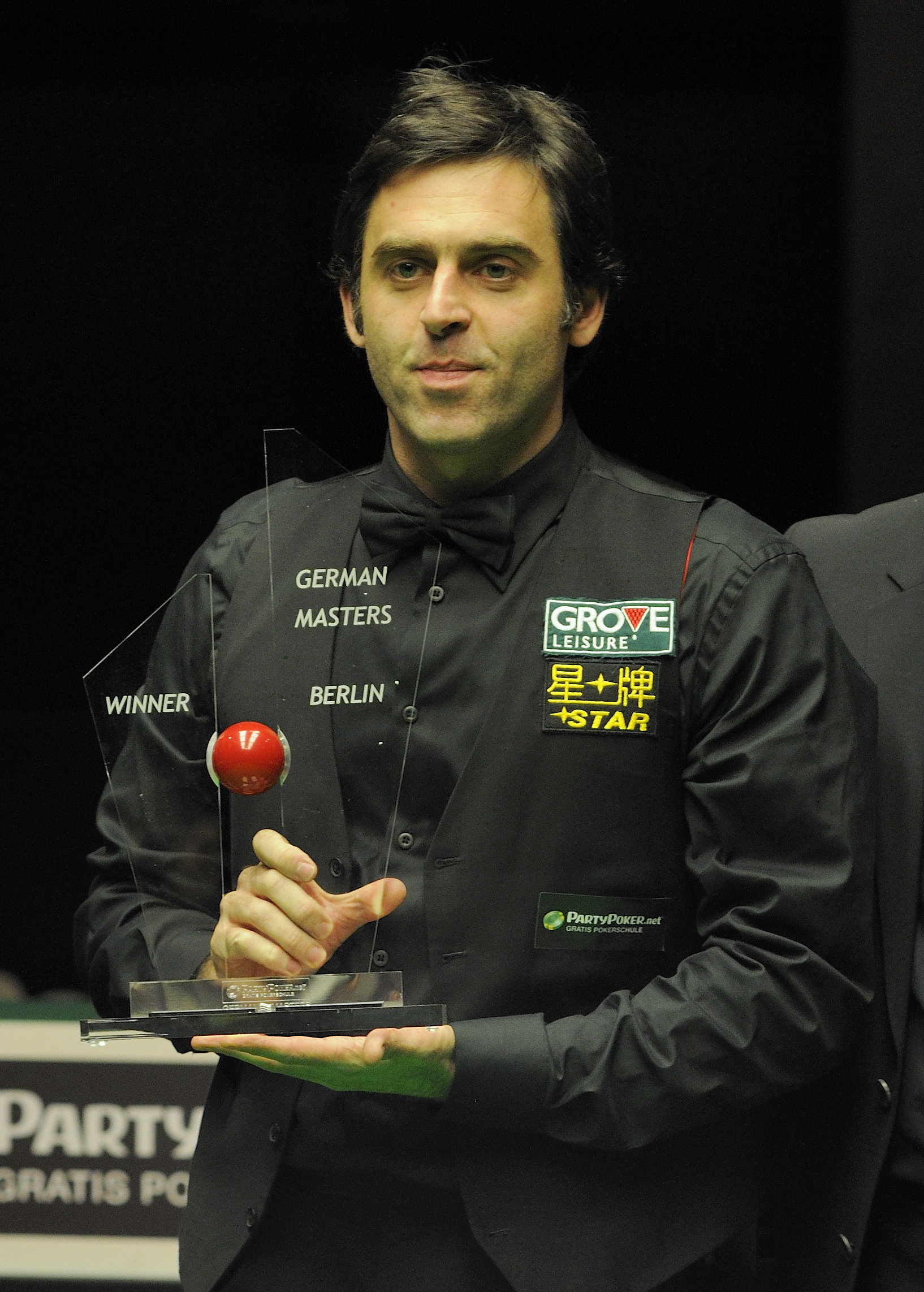
Ronnie O'Sullivan (pictured in 2012) lost 9–8 in the second round to qualifier Mark King.

World number 4 and Pot Black and Northern Ireland Trophy champion Matthew Stevens was the second highest ranked player to lose in the round when he lost 9–3 over Bingham as the match's second session lasted more than an hour. Ninth seed and 1992 UK champion Jimmy White was beaten 9–3 by Ding who led 8–0 after the first session. White won three successive frames in the second session with a best break of 106 on the pink ball in frame ten to prevent a whitewash before Ding won the match with a 77 run. Stephen Lee lost 4–9 to Robertson. Trailing 3–2 Robertson concluded the first session 5–3 ahead. Lee won frame nine with a break of 124 and led 52–0 before Robertson cleared with 76 for 64. Robertson added the next three frames with runs of 90, 55 and 53 to win. Six-time world champion Steve Davis led Allen 8–3 but he was temporarily prevented from winning as Allen took the score to 8–7 before Davis claimed a 9–7 success. Shaun Murphy, the surprise world champion, beat Bond 9–7 despite taking painkillers before and during the match to ease pain from prior dental surgery that saw four of his teeth removed and affected his vision.

World number one Ronnie O'Sullivan established a 5–3 advantage over King but he lost the first three frames of the evening session. O'Sullivan conceded the eleventh frame early, leading to a warning by referee Alan Chamberlain for transgressing tournament rules, and he later scolded O'Sullivan for draping a white towel over his face and head during a prolonged safety shot exchange in frame 15. Down 8–6 O'Sullivan made breaks 106 and 86 to force a final frame decider that King won with a run of 46. World number two and seven-time world champion Stephen Hendry overcame Wattana 9–7. Coming from 7–5 behind Hendry accumulated breaks of 100, 79, 109 and 69 with a sequence of 355 unanswered points to win 9–7. Stephen Maguire, the defending champion, took less than an hour to clinch the three match-winning frames for 9–2 victory against Swail. Of the other seeded players in round two, Graeme Dott was edged out by Mark Davis 9–8, Joe Perry overcame Hawkins 9–7 and Alan McManus lost 9–4 to Carter.

=== Round 3 ===
In the third round Doherty and Higgins shared the first four frames of their match before Doherty made a 107 break and another century to move 4–2 in front. Higgins won two more frames to equal the score at 4–4. Doherty later made three century breaks of 127, 107 and 102 over Higgins to level 6–6 and runs of 64, 52 and 46 in the final three frames won him the match at 9–6, after which he remarked it was his best match since losing to Williams in the 2003 World Snooker Championship final. Bingham was the second player to progress to the quarter-finals with his 9–2 victory over his practice partner Mark Davis. In his match with Ding Hunter played with a loss of feeling in both of his hands and feet, as he went 7–1 behind and took one frame in the next session as Ding secured a 9–2 victory. Ebdon became the sixth top ten ranked player to be eliminated from the competition when he lost 9–7 to Carter. Having recovered from being 4–0 and 7–4 behind to equal the match at 7–7 Ebdon missed the final black ball shot on its spot on the table in the 15th frame and he lost the next frame on a brown ball.

Hendry established a 6–2 advantage during the first session of his match against Williams with breaks of 136, 94 and five more over 40 as Williams did not score a single point in four frames. Hendry claimed the second session's first frame before Williams took the next which the former responded to win 9–3. Davis emerged a 9–8 victor over Maguire. Going 5–3 and then 7–4 ahead Maguire appeared set for a comfortable victory but Davis came back with safety play and a total clearance of 145. In the final frame Maguire missed a straightforward red ball and Davis made a 78 run for the win as Davis outscored Maguire 296–1 in the final three frames. Robertson and Murphy tied at 4–4 until the former won two successive frames. Murphy responded with breaks of 66, 90 and 88 to move 7–6 in front before both players shared frames. Robertson clinched the final frame decider with a break of 47 to win 9–8. King held a 6–2 lead over Perry at the end of his match's first session with a season-high break of 136 but Perry won seven consecutive frames to clinch a 9–6 victory.

=== Quarter–finals ===
In the quarter-finals Hendry was the first player to progress to the semi-finals with a 9–7 victory against Carter. Holding a 5–3 advantage in an opening session that included an unsuccessful maximum break attempt from Carter as the cue ball was in the jaws of a corner pocket on the 14th black ball shot, Hendry extended his lead to 8–4 before Carter won three frames in a row with runs of 73, 57 and 61. In frame 16, and on a break of 35, Carter misjudged a safety shot to split a pack of red balls and Hendry made a break of 64 to claim victory. Davis took 53 minutes to claim frame one over Doherty and he followed with the next four with runs of 54 and 81 to hold a 5–0 advantage. During frame six, Doherty fluked a re-spotted black ball to reduce the deficit but Davis restored his lead of five frames at the first session's conclusion. Doherty came from 8–4 down to narrow the margin to 7–4 and then 8–7. But Davis prevented Doherty from taking the game to a final frame decider when he executed a double shot to pot the black ball into the middle pocket and win 9–7.

Ding continued his strong form by defeating Robertson 9–5. Breaks of 102, 77, 65 and 54 gave Ding a 5–3 lead. Upon the resumption of the match Ding increased his advantage to 8–4 before he finished the match with a break of 92 to overturn Robertson's 36-point lead in frame 14. After the match Ding spoke of his happiness over the win as it ensured he would rise into the top 40 in the provisional world snooker rankings after the tournament's while Robertson praised his opponent's white ball control. Perry edged out Bingham 9–8 to enter the UK Championship semi-finals for the second successive year and Bingham's 13-game winning streak in all competitions ended in a tightly contested match. Perry won frames one and two with breaks of 94 and 73 before Bingham's 92 and 70 breaks concluded the first session at 4–4. Bingham appeared to progress to his first career ranking tournament semi-final at 8–7 but Perry forced a final frame decider with a 100 century break. Perry won the half an hour final frame, outscoring Bingham 79–14 after potting a long-range red ball off the baulk cushion.

=== Semi–finals ===
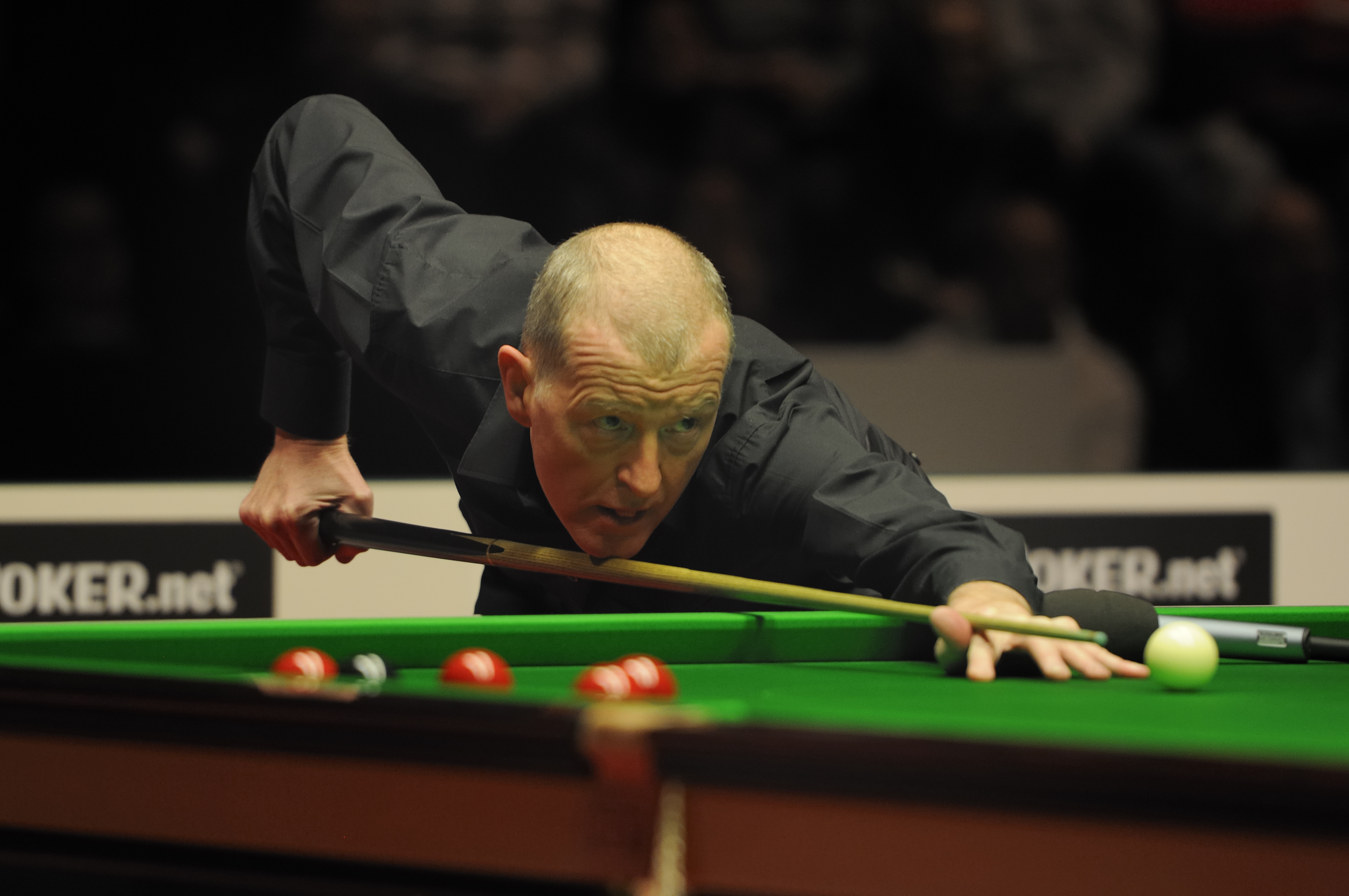
Steve Davis (pictured in 2012) won 9–6 against Stephen Hendry to enter his 100th career final.

In the semi-finals Davis reached his 100th career final, and aged 48 became the oldest finalist in a ranking tournament since Rex Williams in the 1986 Grand Prix with a 9–6 win over Hendry. Davis entered the evening session 7–1 ahead with runs of 57 and 81 but Hendry added five of the first six frames including a 130 break for a new scoreline of 8–6. Hendry was on course to win frame 16 but he missed a straightforward black off its spot while 59–0 in front and Davis responded to win the match with a 66 clearance. After the match Davis said it was "a double bonus" for himself because of him beating his rival Hendry and reaching his 100th career final, "I played a really great frame to go 8–2 up and everything was going nicely, but I botched chances in the next two and then Stephen started playing better." In contrast, Hendry revealed he was indecisive when before he missed the black ball shot that lost him the possibility of winning the game, "I changed my mind about what shot to play and it's a fatal mistake to make."

The other semi-final match had Ding defeat Perry 9–4 to become the first non-British or Irish player to compete in the final of the UK Championship in its 29-year history. After going through the first frame without scoring a point Ding won the second without Perry challenging him. Ding backed it up with century breaks of 129 and 100 and a half-century of 76 to lead Perry 5–3 after the first session. Ding moved clear from Perry with three successive frames and he completed the victory with a break of 131 in the 13th frame. The result ensured Ding, the tournament's youngest player, would face its oldest competitor Davis in the final. Ding said afterwards that he did not feel up to acceptable standard upon entering the competition because of his form in the qualifying rounds but spoke of his belief that he could win. Perry admitted that his opponent outperformed him during the match but reserved praise for Ding's playing style, "I never felt like I was in the match tonight. Ding played better than me throughout. You have to rate him up there with the best now and he looks like becoming world champion in the not too distant future."

=== Final ===
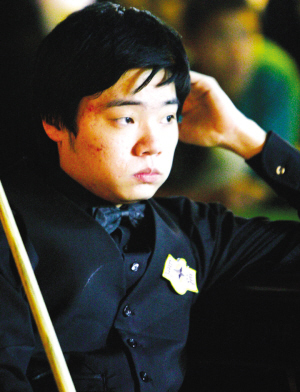
Ding Junhui (pictured in 2009) defeated Steve Davis 10–6 to become the first player from outside the British Isles to win the UK Championship.

In the best-of-19-frame final Ding defeated Davis 10–6 to become the first non-British or Irish player to win the UK Championship. He became the second youngest player after O'Sullivan in the 1993 tournament to win the UK Championship, the second lowest ranked participant (world number 62) to claim overall victory, and the second 18-year old to win two career ranking titles. The victory earned Ding £70,000 in prize money; although he moved from 62nd to 31st in the provisional world rankings, it did not permit him to play in the Masters as Ian McCulloch was awarded a wild card and Shaun Murphy was seeded for all of the season's events. Ding was also not guaranteed automatic qualification to the World Snooker Championship. Nonetheless, Jon Wilde of the Evening Chronicle wrote that Ding had during the match "produced some fantastic break-building and tactical awareness that was beyond his 18 years."

In the afternoon session both players shared the match's first six frames with a break of 111 from Ding in the third. In frame seven Ding retook the lead with a break of 81 and he established a two frame lead after Davis missed a straightforward red ball shot to a corner pocket to end the first session 5–3 ahead. In the evening session Davis conceded 33 points in fouls but was still in contention until he was out of position on a run of 40 and Ding took frame nine after 38 minutes. Davis received a reprieve from Ding after missing a simple pink ball shot to claim frame ten, but he missed a blue ball to the middle pocket while on a break of 39 in the eleventh because he concentrated solely on manoeuvring the cue ball. It allowed Ding to produce a 77 clearance and he followed it with 52 and 78 runs in the 12th frame to lead 8–4 at the mid-session interval. When play resumed Davis made a break of 72 to lower his deficit but Ding immediately re-established a four-frame advantage in frame 14. A break of 74 enabled Ding to lead frame 15 as Ding could not land the required snookers needed. At 9–6 Davis played a poor positional shot on the green ball and Ding cleared the table up to the pink ball to win the match and the tournament.

After the match Ding spoke through an interpreter to thank the audience for their support, "This is the second-most important ranking tournament, so it is a great pleasure to win it. York is a big step for me. I've gained loads of confidence and experience here." He also said that he felt additional pressure than in the China Open but spoke of his hope that more Chinese players would venture to England to play snooker. Davis praised Ding's playing style and spoke of his expectation that more Chinese players would take up snooker, "Ding was stronger than me throughout the final and played great". He also said that he deserved to win the final and that additional players from "China will emerge on the back of this".

== Main draw ==
Numbers to the left of the players' names are the tournament seedings. Players in bold indicate match winners.

Last 48; Best of 17 frames
31	Andy Hicks (ENG)	3
40	**Joe Swail** (NIR)	**9**
23	David Gray (ENG)	6
**Mark Allen** (NIR)	**9**
25	**Marco Fu** (HKG)	**9**
43	Michael Judge (IRL)	6
22	Quinten Hann (AUS)	w/d
38	**Gerard Greene** (NIR)	**w/o**
19	Barry Pinches (ENG)	3
34	**Dominic Dale** (WAL)	**9**
20	**Ali Carter** (ENG)	**9**
Jamie Cope (ENG)	3
24	**Michael Holt** (ENG)	**9**
48	Ricky Walden (ENG)	8
32	**James Wattana** (THA)	**9**
35	Drew Henry (SCO)	4
21	**Mark King** (ENG)	**9**
33	Ryan Day (WAL)	4
30	**Barry Hawkins** (ENG)	**9**
47	Stuart Pettman (ENG)	5
29	John Parrott (ENG)	5
42	**Mark Davis** (ENG)	**9**
26	Robert Milkins (ENG)	4
37	**Stuart Bingham** (ENG)	**9**
17	Ian McCulloch (ENG)	7
56	**Jamie Burnett** (SCO)	**9**
18	Anthony Hamilton (ENG)	3
62	**Ding Junhui** (CHN)	**9**
28	**Neil Robertson** (AUS)	**9**
49	Rory McLeod (ENG)	8
27	**Nigel Bond** (ENG)	**9**
45	Dave Harold (ENG)	7

Last 32; Best of 17 frames
1	**Stephen Maguire** (SCO)	**9**
40	Joe Swail (NIR)	2
16	**Steve Davis** (ENG)	**9**
Mark Allen (NIR)	7
12	**Ken Doherty** (IRL)	**9**
25	Marco Fu (HKG)	8
7	**John Higgins** (SCO)	**9**
38	Gerard Greene (NIR)	3
8	**Peter Ebdon** (ENG)	**9**
34	Dominic Dale (WAL)	4
13	Alan McManus (SCO)	4
20	**Ali Carter** (ENG)	**9**
10	**Mark Williams** (WAL)	**9**
24	Michael Holt (ENG)	2
4	**Stephen Hendry** (SCO)	**9**
32	James Wattana (THA)	7
3	Ronnie O'Sullivan (ENG)	8
21	**Mark King** (ENG)	**9**
15	**Joe Perry** (ENG)	**9**
30	Barry Hawkins (ENG)	7
14	Graeme Dott (SCO)	8
42	**Mark Davis** (ENG)	**9**
5	Matthew Stevens (WAL)	3
37	**Stuart Bingham** (ENG)	**9**
6	**Paul Hunter** (ENG)	**9**
56	Jamie Burnett (SCO)	8
9	Jimmy White (ENG)	3
62	**Ding Junhui** (CHN)	**9**
11	Stephen Lee (ENG)	4
28	**Neil Robertson** (AUS)	**9**
2	**Shaun Murphy** (ENG)	**9**
27	Nigel Bond (ENG)	7

Last 16; Best of 17 frames
1	(Scotland) Stephen Maguire	8
16	(England) **Steve Davis**	**9**
12	(Republic of Ireland) **Ken Doherty**	**9**
7	(Scotland) John Higgins	6
8	(England) Peter Ebdon	7
20	(England) **Ali Carter**	**9**
10	(Wales) Mark Williams	3
4	(Scotland) **Stephen Hendry**	**9**
21	(England) Mark King	6
15	(England) **Joe Perry**	**9**
42	(England) Mark Davis	2
37	(England) **Stuart Bingham**	**9**
6	(England) Paul Hunter	2
62	(China) **Ding Junhui**	**9**
28	(Australia) **Neil Robertson**	**9**
2	(England) Shaun Murphy	8

Quarter-finals; Best of 17 frames
16	(England) **Steve Davis**	**9**
12	(Republic of Ireland) Ken Doherty	7
20	(England) Ali Carter	7
4	(Scotland) **Stephen Hendry**	**9**
15	(England) **Joe Perry**	**9**
37	(England) Stuart Bingham	8
62	(China) **Ding Junhui**	**9**
28	(Australia) Neil Robertson	5

Semi-finals; Best of 17 frames
16	(England) **Steve Davis**	**9**
4	(Scotland) Stephen Hendry	6
15	(England) Joe Perry	4
62	(China) **Ding Junhui**	**9**

Final; Best of 19 frames
16	(England) Steve Davis	6
62	(China) **Ding Junhui**	**10**

=== Final ===
Scores in bold denote winning frame scores and the winning finalist. Breaks over 50 are shown in brackets.

Final: Best of 19 frames. Referee: Jan Verhaas. Barbican Centre, York, 18 December 2005.
Steve Davis (16); England	6–**10**	**Ding Junhui**; China
Afternoon: **61**–23, 40–**72**, 8–**133** (111), **61**–33, 15–**92**, **124**–0 (81), 0–**81** (81), 44–**80**; Evening: 45–**90**, **53**–45, 39–**78** (77), 0–**137** (52, 78), **72**–8 (72), 22–**75**, **75**–29 (74), 44–**52**
81	Highest break	**111**
0	Century breaks	**1**
3	50+ breaks	**5**

== Qualifying ==
The qualifying took place between 31 October and 5 November at Pontin's, Prestatyn, Wales. Players in bold denote match winners.

Round 1 Best of 17 frames
**Sean Storey** (ENG)	**9**
Hugh Abernethy (SCO)	5
Scott MacKenzie (SCO)	8
**Mark Allen** (NIR)	**9**
**David Roe** (ENG)	**9**
Jin Long (CHN)	7
Adam Davies (ENG)	4
**Bjorn Haneveer** (BEL)	**9**
**Rod Lawler** (ENG)	**9**
Nick Dyson (ENG)	2
**Joe Delaney** (IRL)	**9**
James McBain (SCO)	3
Simon Bedford (ENG)	3
**Alex Borg** (MLT)	**9**
**Paul Wykes** (ENG)	**9**
Stuart Mann (ENG)	3
Darren Morgan (WAL)	5
**David Gilbert** (ENG)	**9**
**Paul Davies** (WAL)	**9**
Moh Keen Ho (MAS)	7
Alfie Burden (ENG)	1
**Liang Wenbo** (CHN)	**9**
**Andrew Norman** (ENG)	**9**
Habib Subah (BHR)	4
David McDonnell (IRL)	4
**Gary Wilkinson** (ENG)	**9**
**Ding Junhui** (CHN)	**9**
Judd Trump (ENG)	2
**Leo Fernandez** (IRL)	**9**
Gary Wilson (ENG)	3
**Joe Jogia** (ENG)	**9**
Steve James (ENG)	5

Round 2 Best of 17 frames
Lee Walker (WAL)	6
**Sean Storey** (ENG)	**9**
James Tatton (ENG)	5
**Mark Allen** (NIR)	**9**
**Lee Spick** (ENG)	**9**
David Roe (ENG)	6
Mike Dunn (ENG)	6
**Bjorn Haneveer** (BEL)	**9**
Patrick Wallace (NIR)	4
**Rod Lawler** (ENG)	**9**
**Jamie Cope** (ENG)	**9**
Joe Delaney (IRL)	7
Brian Morgan (ENG)	6
**Alex Borg** (MLT)	**9**
Chris Norbury (ENG)	4
**Paul Wykes** (ENG)	**9**
**Tom Ford** (ENG)	**9**
David Gilbert (ENG)	7
Jimmy Michie (ENG)	3
**Paul Davies** (WAL)	**9**
**Marcus Campbell** (SCO)	**9**
Liang Wenbo (CHN)	8
Justin Astley (ENG)	6
**Andrew Norman** (ENG)	**9**
**Jamie Burnett** (SCO)	**9**
Gary Wilkinson (ENG)	5
Robin Hull (FIN)	6
**Ding Junhui** (CHN)	**9**
**Matthew Couch** (ENG)	**9**
Leo Fernandez (IRL)	5
Shokat Ali (PAK)	3
**Joe Jogia** (ENG)	**9**

Round 3 Best of 17 frames
**Joe Swail** (NIR)	**9**
Sean Storey (ENG)	7
Tony Drago (MLT)	7
**Mark Allen** (NIR)	**9**
**Michael Judge** (IRL)	**9**
Lee Spick (ENG)	5
**Gerard Greene** (NIR)	**9**
Bjorn Haneveer (BEL)	5
**Dominic Dale** (WAL)	**9**
Rod Lawler (ENG)	2
Adrian Gunnell (ENG)	3
**Jamie Cope** (ENG)	**9**
**Ricky Walden** (ENG)	**9**
Alex Borg (MLT)	5
**Drew Henry** (SCO)	**9**
Paul Wykes (ENG)	6
**Ryan Day** (WAL)	**9**
Tom Ford (ENG)	2
**Stuart Pettman** (ENG)	**9**
Paul Davies (WAL)	4
**Mark Davis** (ENG)	**9**
Marcus Campbell (SCO)	7
**Stuart Bingham** (ENG)	**9**
Andrew Norman (ENG)	4
Mark Selby (ENG)	4
**Jamie Burnett** (SCO)	**9**
Fergal O'Brien (IRL)	4
**Ding Junhui** (CHN)	**9**
**Rory McLeod** (ENG)	**9**
Matthew Couch (ENG)	3
**Dave Harold** (ENG)	**9**
Joe Jogia (ENG)	4

== Century breaks ==
=== Televised stage centuries ===
There were a total of 50 century breaks compiled by 24 different players during the main stage of the event. Three players, Davis, Higgins and Holt had the highest break of the event, a 145.

- 145, 133, 102 – Steve Davis
- 145, 114 – John Higgins
- 145, 111 – Michael Holt
- 138, 133 – Dominic Dale
- 136, 130, 114, 109, 100 – Stephen Hendry
- 136, 118, 110 – Barry Hawkins
- 136 – Mark King
- 133, 111, 103 – Stephen Maguire
- 133, 102 – James Wattana
- 131, 129, 111, 102, 100 – Ding Junhui
- 127, 111, 107, 107, 102 – Ken Doherty
- 124 – Stephen Lee
- 123, 105, 104 – Ali Carter
- 123 – Neil Robertson
- 118 – Ian McCulloch
- 116, 105 – Ronnie O'Sullivan
- 111 – Jamie Cope
- 110 – Mark Williams
- 107 – Paul Hunter
- 106 – Jimmy White
- 102 – Shaun Murphy
- 101, 100 – Joe Perry
- 101 – Ricky Walden
- 100 – Marco Fu

=== Qualifying stage centuries ===
A total of 35 century breaks were achieved during the qualifying stages of the competition. Mark Allen scored the highest of the qualifying stage, a 139.

- 139, 111 – Mark Allen
- 135, 131, 101 – Rod Lawler
- 135, 127, 121, 100 – Ding Junhui
- 134 – Liang Wenbo
- 132 – Jamie Burnett
- 131, 105, 101 – Bjorn Haneveer
- 125 – Gerard Greene
- 124 – Sean Storey
- 119 – Dominic Dale
- 117 – Gary Wilson
- 114 – James Tatton
- 113, 107 – Tom Ford
- 112 – Ryan Day
- 112 – Patrick Wallace
- 111 – Robin Hull
- 109 – Paul Wykes
- 108, 105 – David Gilbert
- 108, 104 – Joe Swail
- 107 – Justin Astley
- 106 – Lee Walker
- 105, 103 – Jamie Cope
- 104 – Mark Davis
- 103 – Marcus Campbell
