= 2006 China Open (snooker) =

Star Dragon Woods Villa Cup China Open

Tournament information
- Dates: 20–26 March 2006
- Venue: Beijing University Students' Gymnasium
- City: Beijing
- Country: China
- Organisation: WPBSA
- Format: Ranking event
- Total prize fund: £197,250
- Winner's share: £30,000
- Highest break: Ding Junhui (CHN) (135)

Final
- Champion: Mark Williams (WAL)
- Runner-up: John Higgins (SCO)
- Score: 9–8

The 2006 Star Dragon Woods Villa Cup China Open was a professional ranking snooker tournament that took place between 20 and 26 March 2006 at the Beijing University Students' Gymnasium in Beijing, China. It was the penultimate ranking event of the 2005–06 season, preceding the 2006 World Championship.

Mark Williams won the tournament by defeating John Higgins 9–8 in a high-quality final.

== Prize fund ==
The breakdown of prize money for this year is shown below:

Winner: £30,000
Runner Up: £15,000
Semi Finalist: £7,500
Quarter Finalist: £5,600
Last 16: £4,000
Last 32: £2,500
Last 48: £1,625
Last 64: £1,100

Stage one high break: £500
Stage two high break: £2,000

Stage one maximum break: £1,000
Stage two maximum break: £20,000

== Wildcard round ==
Match		Score	
WC1	Dave Harold (ENG)	2–5	Yang Qingtian (CHN)
WC2	Andrew Norman (ENG)	1–5	Yu Delu (CHN)
WC3	Joe Swail (NIR)	5–2	Liu Chuang (CHN)
WC4	David Roe (ENG)	5–2	Li Yinxi (CHN)
WC5	Scott MacKenzie (SCO)	5–2	Li Hang (CHN)
WC6	Jamie Cope (ENG)	5–2	Tian Pengfei (CHN)
WC7	Ricky Walden (ENG)	5–1	Cao Kaisheng (CHN)
WC8	Adrian Gunnell (ENG)	5–3	Zheng Peng (CHN)

== Main draw ==
Last 32; Best of 9 frames
1	(China) Ding Junhui	5
(China) Yang Qing Tian	4
15	(Scotland) Graeme Dott	5
(China) Yu De Lu	1
10	(England) Jimmy White	3
(Northern Ireland) Joe Swail	5
7	(England) Paul Hunter	4
(England) David Roe	5
6	(Wales) Matthew Stevens	4
(Scotland) Scott MacKenzie	5
11	(Wales) Mark Williams	5
(Scotland) Drew Henry	2
14	(Scotland) Alan McManus	2
(England) Jamie Cope	5
4	(Scotland) Stephen Hendry	5
(England) Barry Hawkins	1
3	(England) Ronnie O'Sullivan	0
(Thailand) James Wattana	5
12	(England) Stephen Lee	5
(England) David Gray	2
13	(Republic of Ireland) Ken Doherty	5
(Australia) Neil Robertson	4
5	(Scotland) Stephen Maguire	3
(England) Ricky Walden	5
8	(Scotland) John Higgins	5
(England) Stuart Bingham	4
9	(England) Peter Ebdon	5
(England) Mark Selby	4
16	(England) Joe Perry	5
(England) Adrian Gunnell	4
2	(England) Shaun Murphy	2
(England) Michael Holt	5

Last 16; Best of 9 frames
1	(China) Ding Junhui	5
15	(Scotland) Graeme Dott	2
(Northern Ireland) Joe Swail	5
(England) David Roe	3
(Scotland) Scott MacKenzie	0
11	(Wales) Mark Williams	5
(England) Jamie Cope	4
4	(Scotland) Stephen Hendry	5
(Thailand) James Wattana	4
12	(England) Stephen Lee	5
13	(Republic of Ireland) Ken Doherty	5
(England) Ricky Walden	2
8	(Scotland) John Higgins	5
9	(England) Peter Ebdon	0
16	(England) Joe Perry	5
(England) Michael Holt	4

Quarter-finals; Best of 9 frames
1	(China) Ding Junhui	5
(Northern Ireland) Joe Swail	0
11	(Wales) Mark Williams	5
4	(Scotland) Stephen Hendry	1
12	(England) Stephen Lee	2
13	(Republic of Ireland) Ken Doherty	5
8	(Scotland) John Higgins	5
16	(England) Joe Perry	2

Semi-finals; Best of 11 frames
1	(China) Ding Junhui	2
11	(Wales) Mark Williams	6
13	(Republic of Ireland) Ken Doherty	2
8	(Scotland) John Higgins	6

Final; Best of 19 frames
11	(Wales) Mark Williams	9
8	(Scotland) John Higgins	8

== Final ==
Final: Best of 17 frames. Referee: Eirian Williams. Beijing University Students' Gymnasium, Beijing, China, March 26, 2006.
Mark Williams (11); Wales	9–8	John Higgins (8); Scotland
Afternoon: 1–85 (54), 63–60, 60–66 (56, 66), 72–52, 69–0 (60), 3–74 (74), 25–68, 73–32 (66); Evening: 67–0, 57–71, 78–42 (61), 39–58, 0–75 (69), 70–12 (69), 58–47, 28–64 (64), 69–44
69	Highest break	74
0	Century breaks	0
5	50+ breaks	5

== Qualifying ==
Qualifying for the tournament took place at Pontin's in Prestatyn, Wales between November 15 and November 18, 2005.

Round 1 Best of 9 frames
(England) Rod Lawler	4
(England) Stuart Mann	5
(England) Andrew Norman	w/o
(England) Steve James	w/d
(England) Brian Morgan	2
(England) David Gilbert	5
(England) David Roe	5
(Malta) Alex Borg	1
(Scotland) Scott MacKenzie	5
(Malaysia) Moh Keen Ho	0
(England) Simon Bedford	5
(England) Gary Wilkinson	3
(England) Alfie Burden	5
(England) Nick Dyson	3
(Republic of Ireland) Joe Delaney	5
(Scotland) James McBain	2
(England) Sean Storey	4
(Scotland) Hugh Abernethy	5
(Wales) Paul Davies	w/o
(China) Jin Long	w/d
(Republic of Ireland) Leo Fernandez	5
(England) Gary Wilson	3
(England) Paul Wykes	5
(Bahrain) Habib Subah	1
(England) Shailesh Jogia	1
(Northern Ireland) Mark Allen	5
(England) Adam Davies	5
(Belgium) Bjorn Haneveer	4
(Republic of Ireland) David McDonnell	4
(China) Liang Wenbo	5
(Wales) Darren Morgan	0
(England) Judd Trump	5

Round 2 Best of 9 frames
(England) Tom Ford	5
(England) Stuart Mann	1
(Scotland) Marcus Campbell	4
(England) Andrew Norman	5
(England) Mike Dunn	2
(England) David Gilbert	5
(Finland) Robin Hull	2
(England) David Roe	5
(England) Chris Norbury	1
(Scotland) Scott MacKenzie	5
(Pakistan) Shokat Ali	4
(England) Simon Bedford	5
(England) Jamie Cope	5
(England) Alfie Burden	4
(England) Jimmy Michie	5
(Republic of Ireland) Joe Delaney	4
(Northern Ireland) Patrick Wallace	3
(Scotland) Hugh Abernethy	5
(Scotland) Jamie Burnett	5
(Wales) Paul Davies	4
(England) James Tatton	4
(Republic of Ireland) Leo Fernandez	5
(England) Lee Spick	5
(England) Paul Wykes	3
(England) Rory McLeod	5
(Northern Ireland) Mark Allen	0
(England) Justin Astley	5
(England) Adam Davies	3
(England) Matthew Couch	2
(China) Liang Wenbo	5
(Wales) Lee Walker	4
(England) Judd Trump	5

Round 3 Best of 9 frames
(England) Dave Harold	5
(England) Tom Ford	3
(Malta) Tony Drago	3
(England) Andrew Norman	5
(Northern Ireland) Joe Swail	5
(England) David Gilbert	4
(England) Mark Davis	3
(England) David Roe	5
(Northern Ireland) Gerard Greene	2
(Scotland) Scott MacKenzie	5
(Scotland) Drew Henry	5
(England) Simon Bedford	0
(Wales) Dominic Dale	3
(England) Jamie Cope	5
(Republic of Ireland) Fergal O'Brien	4
(England) Jimmy Michie	5
(Thailand) James Wattana	5
(Scotland) Hugh Abernethy	4
(Wales) Ryan Day	5
(Scotland) Jamie Burnett	4
(England) Stuart Pettman	5
(Republic of Ireland) Leo Fernandez	1
(England) Ricky Walden	5
(England) Lee Spick	4
(England) Stuart Bingham	5
(England) Rory McLeod	2
(England) Mark Selby	5
(England) Justin Astley	4
(England) Adrian Gunnell	5
(China) Liang Wenbo	3
(Republic of Ireland) Michael Judge	4
(England) Judd Trump	5

Round 4 Best of 9 frames
(England) Ali Carter	2
(England) Dave Harold	5
(England) Barry Pinches	0
(England) Andrew Norman	5
(England) Andy Hicks	3
(Northern Ireland) Joe Swail	5
(Australia) Quinten Hann	wd
(England) David Roe	wo
(England) Ian McCulloch	2
(Scotland) Scott MacKenzie	5
(England) Robert Milkins	2
(Scotland) Drew Henry	5
(England) John Parrott	1
(England) Jamie Cope	5
(England) Barry Hawkins	5
(England) Jimmy Michie	4
(England) Nigel Bond	2
(Thailand) James Wattana	5
(England) David Gray	5
(Wales) Ryan Day	3
(Australia) Neil Robertson	5
(England) Stuart Pettman	1
(England) Steve Davis	wd
(England) Ricky Walden	wo
(England) Mark King	2
(England) Stuart Bingham	5
(England) Anthony Hamilton	2
(England) Mark Selby	5
(Hong Kong) Marco Fu	1
(England) Adrian Gunnell	5
(England) Michael Holt	5
(England) Judd Trump	4

== Century breaks ==
=== Qualifying stage centuries ===
- 137 – Mark Selby
- 134 – Dave Harold
- 130 – Nick Dyson
- 129 – Jamie Burnett
- 129 – Mark Davis
- 127 – Patrick Wallace
- 126 – Jimmy Michie
- 124, 104 – Ryan Day
- 122 – Simon Bedford
- 119 – Leo Fernandez
- 118, 107 – Stuart Bingham
- 118 – Robin Hull
- 116 – David Gilbert
- 114 – James Tatton
- 114 – Judd Trump
- 112 – Gary Wilson
- 109 – Alfie Burden
- 109 – Fergal O'Brien
- 106 – Andrew Norman
- 104 – Liang Wenbo
- 101 – Brian Morgan
- 101 – Scott MacKenzie
- 101 – David Roe

=== Televised stage centuries ===
- 135, 119, 114 – Ding Junhui
- 133, 116, 115 – Mark Williams
- 131 – David Roe
- 128, 100 – John Higgins
- 127, 122 – Ricky Walden
- 127 – Adrian Gunnell
- 125 – Joe Swail
- 124, 112 – Jamie Cope
- 124 – Shaun Murphy
- 123 – Michael Holt
- 120 – Graeme Dott
- 115 – Drew Henry
- 107 – Scott MacKenzie
- 107 – Yang Qingtian
- 105 – Joe Perry
- 101 – Matthew Stevens
