= 2006 Malta Cup =

Tournament information
- Dates: 30 January – 5 February 2006
- Venue: Hilton Conference Center
- City: Portomaso
- Country: Malta
- Organisation: WPBSA
- Format: Ranking event
- Total prize fund: £118,500
- Winner's share: £18,000
- Highest break: Stephen Hendry (SCO) (142)

Final
- Champion: Ken Doherty (IRL)
- Runner-up: John Higgins (SCO)
- Score: 9–8

The 2006 Malta Cup was a professional ranking snooker tournament that took place between 30 January and 5 February 2006 at the Hilton Conference Center in Portomaso, Malta.

Ken Doherty won in the final 9–8 against John Higgins. Higgins had recovered from 2–5 down to lead 8–5 but Doherty won the last four frames to win the title.

This years tournament was also noteworthy for Ronnie O'Sullivan's decision not to compete, which cost him the World Number 1 ranking for the start of the following season and allowed Stephen Hendry to regain the number one position for the first time since 1999.

== Wild-card round ==
Match		Score	
WC1	(Northern Ireland) Mark Allen	5–1	(Malta) Joe Grech
WC2	(Finland) Robin Hull	5–2	(Malta) Simon Zammit

== Main draw ==
Last 32; Best of 9 frames
1	(Scotland) Stephen Hendry	5
(Australia) Neil Robertson	1
10	(England) Stephen Lee	1
(England) Barry Pinches	5
12	(Scotland) Alan McManus	5
(England) Ali Carter	2
6	(Scotland) John Higgins	5
(England) Robert Milkins	4
5	(England) Paul Hunter	3
(Wales) Dominic Dale	5
14	(England) Joe Perry	5
(Thailand) James Wattana	2
9	(Wales) Mark Williams	5
(Northern Ireland) Gerard Greene	3
4	(Wales) Matthew Stevens	2
(England) Nigel Bond	5
3	(Scotland) Stephen Maguire	5
(Hong Kong) Marco Fu	2
16	(England) Ian McCulloch	2
(England) Mark King	5
11	(Republic of Ireland) Ken Doherty	5
(Northern Ireland) Joe Swail	3
7	(England) Peter Ebdon	4
(England) Stuart Bingham	5
8	(England) Jimmy White	2
(England) Barry Hawkins	5
15	(England) Steve Davis	4
(Finland) Robin Hull	5
13	(Scotland) Graeme Dott	5
(England) John Parrott	2
2	(England) Shaun Murphy	5
(Northern Ireland) Mark Allen	2

Last 16; Best of 9 frames
1	(Scotland) Stephen Hendry	5
(England) Barry Pinches	2
12	(Scotland) Alan McManus	0
6	(Scotland) John Higgins	5
(Wales) Dominic Dale	5
14	(England) Joe Perry	4
9	(Wales) Mark Williams	5
(England) Nigel Bond	1
3	(Scotland) Stephen Maguire	5
(England) Mark King	3
11	(Republic of Ireland) Ken Doherty	5
(England) Stuart Bingham	4
(England) Barry Hawkins	3
(Finland) Robin Hull	5
13	(Scotland) Graeme Dott	5
2	(England) Shaun Murphy	4

Quarter-finals; Best of 9 frames
1	(Scotland) Stephen Hendry	2
6	(Scotland) John Higgins	5
(Wales) Dominic Dale	5
9	(Wales) Mark Williams	3
3	(Scotland) Stephen Maguire	4
11	(Republic of Ireland) Ken Doherty	5
(Finland) Robin Hull	0
13	(Scotland) Graeme Dott	5

Semi-finals; Best of 11 fames
6	(Scotland) John Higgins	6
(Wales) Dominic Dale	3
11	(Republic of Ireland) Ken Doherty	6
13	(Scotland) Graeme Dott	3

Final; Best of 17 frames
6	(Scotland) John Higgins	8
11	(Republic of Ireland) Ken Doherty	9

== Final ==
Final: Best of 17 frames Hilton Conference Centre, Malta, 5 February 2006.
John Higgins (6); Scotland	8–9	Ken Doherty (11); Ireland
Afternoon: 8–86 (67), 69–49, 78–28, 53–71 (65), 28–76 (55), 27–105 (105), 56–75 (70); Evening: 67–53 (61), 89–8 (55), 90–22 (90), 75–50, 130–4 (114), 96–4 (96), 43–64, 5–67 (61), 12–60, 12–69 (63)
114	Highest break	105
1	Century breaks	1
5	50+ breaks	7

== Qualifying ==
Qualifying for the tournament took place at Pontins in Prestatyn, Wales between 7 and 10 November 2005.

Round 1 Best of 9 frames
(Republic of Ireland) Leo Fernandez
Bye
(Republic of Ireland) Joe Delaney	5
(Scotland) James McBain	4
(England) Andrew Norman	5
(China) Jin Long	2
(England) Nick Dyson	5
(Bahrain) Habib Subah	4
(Belgium) Bjorn Haneveer	3
(England) David Gilbert	5
(England) Simon Bedford
Bye
(England) Sean Storey	5
(Malta) Alex Borg	3
(Scotland) Scott MacKenzie
Bye
(Wales) Paul Davies	5
(China) Liang Wenbo	3
(England) Joe Jogia
Bye
(England) Alfie Burden	2
(England) Judd Trump	5
(Scotland) Hugh Abernethy	5
(Malaysia) Moh Keen Ho	2
(Wales) Darren Morgan	5
(England) Gary Wilson	4
(England) Adam Davies
Bye
(Republic of Ireland) David McDonnell	3
(England) Gary Wilkinson	5
(England) Stuart Mann	4
(Northern Ireland) Mark Allen	5

Round 2 Best of 9 frames
(England) Justin Astley	4
(Republic of Ireland) Leo Fernandez	5
(Pakistan) Shokat Ali	5
(Republic of Ireland) Joe Delaney	4
(Scotland) Marcus Campbell	5
(England) Andrew Norman	3
(England) Jamie Cope	5
(England) Nick Dyson	2
(China) Ding Junhui	1
(England) David Gilbert	5
(England) Chris Norbury	5
(England) Simon Bedford	4
(England) Mike Dunn	5
(England) Sean Storey	4
(England) Lee Spick	1
(Scotland) Scott MacKenzie	5
(England) Rod Lawler	5
(Wales) Paul Davies	2
(England) Matthew Couch	5
(England) Joe Jogia	0
(England) Jimmy Michie	5
(England) Judd Trump	2
(Scotland) Jamie Burnett	5
(Scotland) Hugh Abernethy	0
(England) David Roe	5
(Wales) Darren Morgan	2
(Finland) Robin Hull	5
(England) Adam Davies	3
(England) James Tatton	1
(England) Gary Wilkinson	5
(Wales) Lee Walker	2
(Northern Ireland) Mark Allen	5

Round 3 Best of 9 frames
(England) Dave Harold	5
(Republic of Ireland) Leo Fernandez	3
(Malta) Tony Drago	5
(Pakistan) Shokat Ali	2
(England) Mark Selby	3
(Scotland) Marcus Campbell	5
(England) Stuart Pettman	0
(England) Jamie Cope	5
(England) Ricky Walden	5
(England) David Gilbert	1
(Republic of Ireland) Michael Judge	5
(England) Chris Norbury	1
(Northern Ireland) Gerard Greene	5
(England) Mike Dunn	3
(Republic of Ireland) Fergal O'Brien	5
(Scotland) Scott MacKenzie	4
(England) Mark Davis	5
(England) Rod Lawler	4
(Scotland) Drew Henry	5
(England) Matthew Couch	4
(Northern Ireland) Joe Swail	5
(England) Jimmy Michie	3
(England) Stuart Bingham	5
(Scotland) Jamie Burnett	3
(England) Tom Ford	2
(England) David Roe	5
(England) Adrian Gunnell	4
(Finland) Robin Hull	5
(Northern Ireland) Patrick Wallace	2
(England) Gary Wilkinson	5
(England) Rory McLeod	1
(Northern Ireland) Mark Allen	5

Round 4 Best of 9 frames
(Australia) Neil Robertson	5
(England) Dave Harold	4
(England) Barry Pinches	5
(Malta) Tony Drago	2
(England) Ali Carter	5
(Scotland) Marcus Campbell	3
(England) Robert Milkins	5
(England) Jamie Cope	3
(Wales) Dominic Dale	5
(England) Ricky Walden	1
(Thailand) James Wattana	5
(Republic of Ireland) Michael Judge	2
(Wales) Ryan Day	1
(Northern Ireland) Gerard Greene	5
(England) Nigel Bond	5
(Republic of Ireland) Fergal O'Brien	3
(Hong Kong) Marco Fu	5
(England) Mark Davis	4
(England) Mark King	5
(Scotland) Drew Henry	3
(England) Michael Holt	4
(Northern Ireland) Joe Swail	5
(England) Anthony Hamilton	3
(England) Stuart Bingham	5
(England) Barry Hawkins	5
(England) David Roe	4
(England) Andy Hicks	3
(Finland) Robin Hull	5
(England) John Parrott	5
(England) Gary Wilkinson	3
(England) David Gray	2
(Northern Ireland) Mark Allen	5

== Century breaks ==
=== Qualifying stage centuries ===
- 137 – Jamie Cope
- 135 – Gary Wilkinson
- 129 – Dave Harold
- 124 – Jamie Burnett
- 120, 101 – Robin Hull
- 116 – Nick Dyson
- 107 – Mark Allen
- 106 – Mark Davis
- 105, 100 – David Gilbert
- 105 – Joe Swail
- 104 – Rod Lawler
- 103 – Ali Carter
- 102 – Stuart Mann
- 101 – Judd Trump
- 100 – Liang Wenbo
- 100 – James Wattana

=== Televised stage centuries ===
- 142, 131, 104, 103 – Stephen Hendry
- 135 – Barry Hawkins
- 133, 127, 103 – Stephen Maguire
- 133, 126, 104 – Robin Hull
- 133, 119, 106, 105 – Ken Doherty
- 132, 105 – Graeme Dott
- 129 – Stuart Bingham
- 114, 105, 102 – John Higgins
- 114 – Tony Drago
- 111 – Mark King
- 104 – Mark Allen
- 104 – Steve Davis
- 104 – Joe Swail
- 103 – Stephen Lee
- 100 – Alan McManus
- 100 – Gerard Greene
- 100 – Marco Fu
