= 2006 World Snooker Championship =

Professional snooker tournament

2006 888.com World Snooker Championship

Tournament information
- Dates: 15 April – 1 May 2006
- Venue: Crucible Theatre
- City: Sheffield
- Country: England
- Organisation: WPBSA
- Format: Ranking event
- Total prize fund: £896,240
- Winner's share: £200,000
- Highest break: Ronnie O'Sullivan (ENG) (140)

Final
- Champion: Graeme Dott (SCO)
- Runner-up: Peter Ebdon (ENG)
- Score: 18–14

The 2006 World Snooker Championship (officially the 2006 888.com World Snooker Championship) was a professional snooker tournament. It was held at the Crucible Theatre in Sheffield, England. It was the 30th consecutive year that the World Snooker Championship was staged at the venue. It started on 15 April 2006 and was scheduled to finish on 1 May 2006, but continued into the early hours of 2 May. The sixth and final ranking tournament of the 2005–06 snooker season, it was organised by the World Professional Billiards and Snooker Association and sponsored for the first time by online casino 888.com. The total prize fund was £896,240, of which the winner received £200,000.

The qualifying rounds took place from 8 to 13 January and from 14 to 15 March 2006 at Pontin's, in Prestatyn, Wales. The 16 qualifiers and the top 16 players from the snooker world rankings reached the tournament's main stage at the Crucible. Shaun Murphy was the defending champion, having defeated Matthew Stevens 18–16 in the 2005 final. He lost in the quarter-finals against eventual runner-up Peter Ebdon and became another world champion who fell to the Crucible curse and could not defend his first world title.

There was just one debutant at the event for the first time - Barry Hawkins. Graeme Dott defeated Ebdon 18–14 in the final. Ending at 12:52 a.m. BST, it surpassed the 1985 final between Dennis Taylor and Steve Davis as the latest finish for a World Championship final. A total of 46 century breaks were compiled during the event's main stage, the highest being a 140 made by Ronnie O'Sullivan. Another 52 century breaks were made during the qualifying rounds.

== Background ==
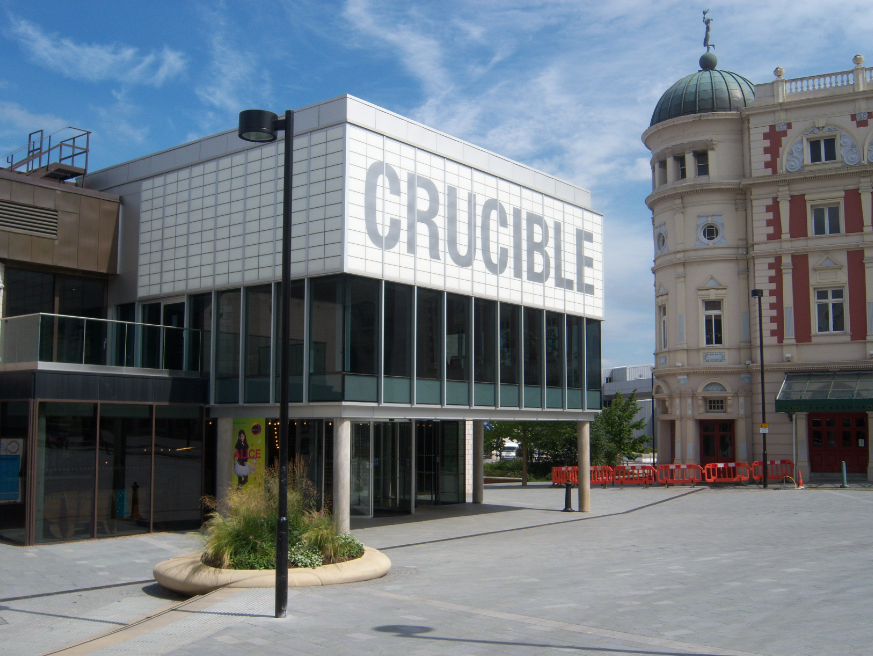
For the 30th consecutive year, the main stage of the tournament was held at the Crucible Theatre (pictured) in Sheffield, England.

The inaugural 1927 World Snooker Championship, then known as the Professional Championship of Snooker, took place at various venues in England between November 1926 and May 1927. Joe Davis won the final—held at Camkin's Hall in Birmingham from 9 to 12 May 1927—and went on to win the tournament 15 consecutive times before retiring undefeated after the 1946 edition (no tournaments were held from 1941 to 1945 because of World War II). The tournament went into abeyance after only two players contested the 1952 edition, due to a dispute between the Professional Billiards Players' Association (PBPA) and the Billiards Association and Control Council (BACC). The PBPA established an alternative tournament, the World Professional Match-play Championship, of which the six editions held between 1952 and 1957 are retroactively regarded as legitimate continuations of the World Snooker Championship. However, due to waning public interest in snooker during the post-war era, that tournament was also discontinued, and the world title was uncontested between 1958 and 1963.

Then-professional player Rex Williams was instrumental in reviving the World Snooker Championship on a challenge basis in 1964. John Pulman, winner of the 1957 World Professional Match-play Championship, defended the world title across seven challenge matches between 1964 and 1968. The World Snooker Championship reverted to an annual knockout tournament for the 1969 edition, marking the beginning of the championship's "modern era". The 1977 edition was the first staged at the Crucible Theatre in Sheffield, where it has remained since. The most successful players in the modern era was Stephen Hendry, having won the title seven times. Hendry was also the tournament's youngest winner, having captured his first title at the 1990 event, aged 21 years and 106 days. Ray Reardon became the oldest winner when he secured his sixth title at the 1978 event, aged 45 years and 203 days.

English player Shaun Murphy won his first world title at the 2005 championship, defeating Welsh player Matthew Stevens 18–16 in the final. Organised by the World Professional Billiards and Snooker Association, the 2006 tournament was sponsored by online casino 888.com. Following new EU and UK legislation banning tobacco advertising, it could not be sponsored by Embassy, as had been the case for the previous three decades. In January 2006, World Snooker – the sport's governing body – announced that the online casino 888.com would be the new sponsors of the event for the next five years. However, this decision led to conflict with some players who lost income from their own personal sponsors, who were rival firms of 888.com. Concerns were expressed among the sport's elite at the decrease in prize money and in the number of ranking events (down to six for the 2005–06 season) since the loss of tobacco sponsorship. For the 2006 World Championship, the winner's cheque was down 20% on what it was in 2005.

=== Prize fund ===
The breakdown of prize money for this year is shown below:

- Winner: £200,000
- Runner-up: £100,000
- Semi-final: £40,800
- Quarter-final: £20,800
- Last 16: £12,680
- Last 32: £9,600
- Last 48: £6,400
- Last 64: £4,000
- Televised stage highest break: £10,000
- Qualifying stage maximum break: £5,000
- Televised stage maximum break: £147,000
- Total: £896,240

== Tournament summary ==
=== First round ===
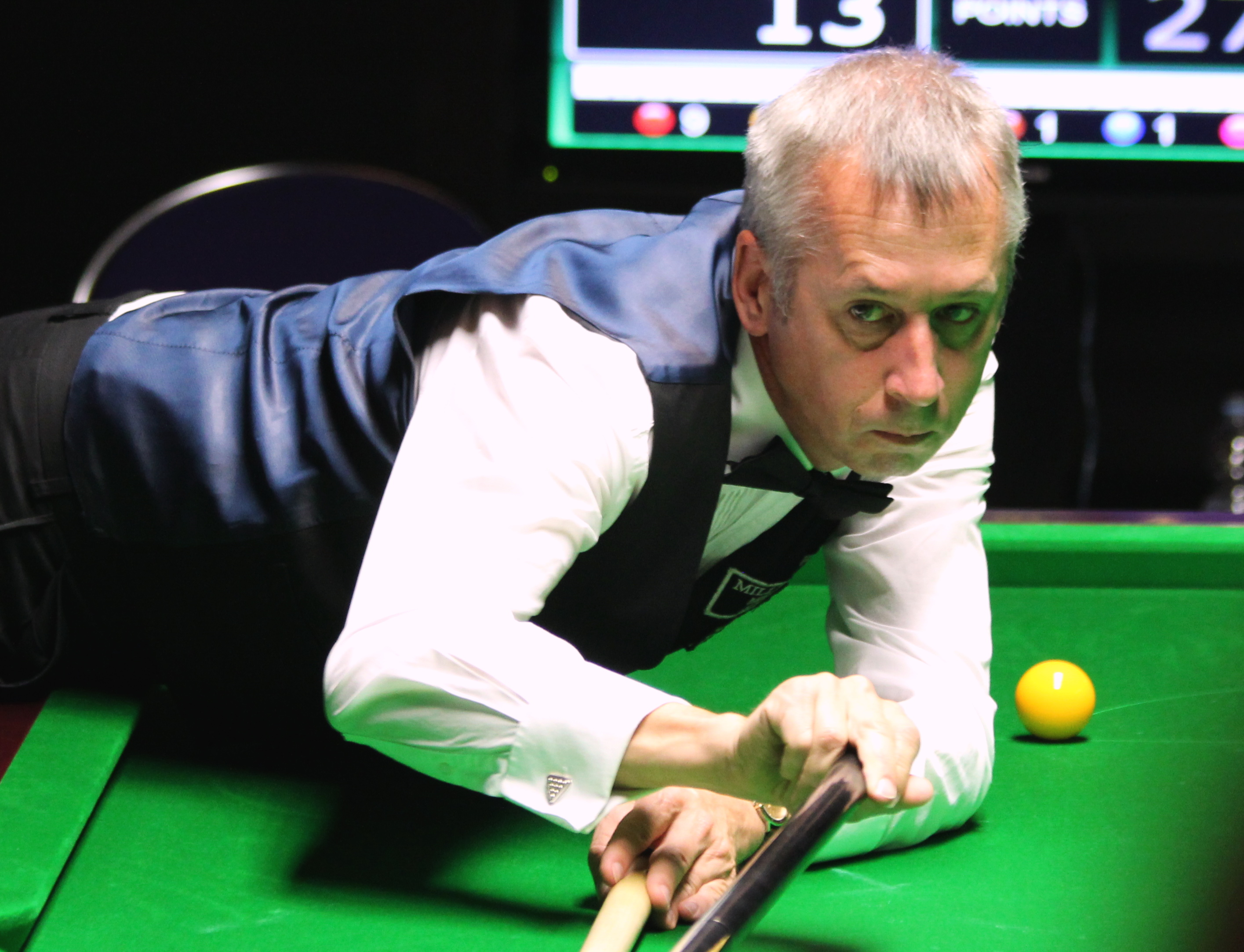
Nigel Bond (pictured in 2016) won his first-round match against seven-time champion Stephen Hendry on the re-spotted black of the deciding frame.

The first round was played between 15 and 20 April as the best of 19 frames played over two sessions. The defending champion, Shaun Murphy, was afflicted with a chest infection, but still defeated Thai player James Wattana 10–4. Three former world champions lost their first round matches. In his match against seven-time champion Stephen Hendry, Nigel Bond potted the black ball for what would have been a win in the deciding frame, but the cue ball dropped in the right-hand middle pocket, which meant that the frame was tied at 48–48 due to the seven penalty points. Bond still won the match on the re-spotted black. This was the first time that a World Championship match was decided on a re-spotted black.

John Parrott, the 1991 champion, faced Graeme Dott, 2004 runner-up. Dott gained a 5–0 advantage, with breaks of 98, 50, 56, 80 and 57 extended to a 7–2 lead at the end of the first session. Parrott only managed to win one more frame as Dott advanced into the second round with a 10–3 victory. "These days I can't sustain my concentration for long periods and if I'm on a break of 40 or 50 I know a bad shot is coming up. I just throw people a lifeline", Parrott said afterwards. John Higgins, winner in 1998 and champion of the Grand Prix and Masters during the season, lost 4–10 against qualifier Mark Selby. Selby, playing at the Crucible only for the second time in his career, clinched victory with a 110, his second century break of the match.

Neil Robertson also won a match at the event for the first time. His opponent, Paul Hunter, was playing in pain from chemotherapy treatment for a rare form of stomach cancer. "I didn't think I would make it here because I was in a pretty bad way", said Hunter. The first four frames were shared, but Robertson managed to put himself 7–2 ahead at the end of the first session. The encounter, which ended with a 10–5 victory for him, would turn out to be the last professional match for Hunter, who died later that year, aged 27. Six-time runner-up Jimmy White went into the second session with a three-frame deficit against David Gray, and lost two of the first three frames of the last session on the black ball. Gray won the match 10–5, and it was White's last appearance in the televised stage of the World Championship.

Six-time champion Steve Davis, who was aged 48, built in the first session a four-frame cushion against qualifier and 1995 semi-finalist Andy Hicks. Although Hicks managed to cut the deficit by half when the match resumed, Davis then won four frames in a row to secure victory. "I was even able to laugh at some of the shots I missed and the crowd were laughing too", he commented after the game. Peter Ebdon, the 2002 champion, faced qualifier Michael Holt, who had made his debut at the Crucible the previous year. Breaks of 94, 87 and 66 helped Ebdon to a 4–0 lead, but Holt then reduced the score to only one behind frame with three on the trot, making a 102 century break in the process. Ebdon, who complained about the table being "very heavy" and playing "like a club table", went on to win 10–8, with two breaks of 79 and others of 84 and 72 along the way. Other players also made complaints about the tables, and organizers agreed to replace the cloth used.

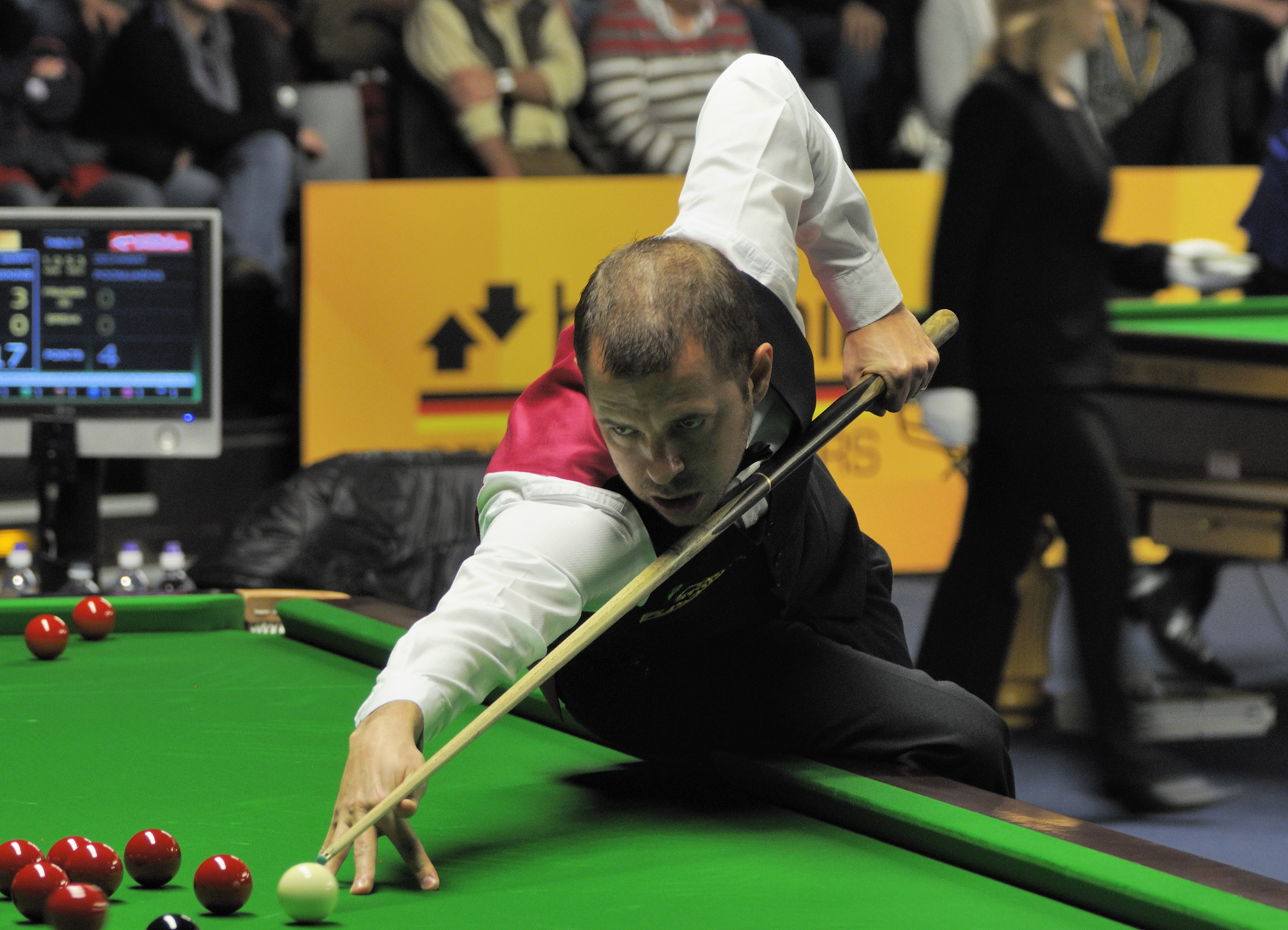
Barry Hawkins (pictured in 2013) made his debut at the Crucible, but lost 1–10 to the 1997 champion Ken Doherty in the first round.

Barry Hawkins was the only player to make his debut at the main stage of the World Championship in this edition, meaning it was the first time that just one player was new at the Crucible. In his first-round match against Ken Doherty, the 1997 champion, he took the first frame with a 66 break, but then lost ten in a row, with Doherty compiling four half-centuries. "Ken had nobody to beat and I'm gutted after such a good season to have played like that", regretted Hawkins, who had, nonetheless, secured a place amongst the top 10 for the following season.

In a repeat of one of the 2000 semi-finals, two-time runner-up Matthew Stevens compiled two century breaks in the first session against Joe Swail, who was "absolutely disgusted" with the table and fell 3–6 behind in the scoreboard. In the last session, Stevens made another century, this time of 112, and clinched victory with a result of 10–5. 1992 and 1993 semi-finalist Alan McManus faced Marco Fu, quarter-finalist in 2003. Fu went into the final session with a 4–3 lead and won six out of the six frames that were played to seal victory, leaving McManus out of the top 16 for the following season. Stephen Maguire, who had not made it past the first round up to that point, defeated Mark King 10–6, producing breaks of 78 and 77 in the final session.

Two-time world champion Ronnie O'Sullivan made a century break of 106 in the first frame, in which he was helped by an "outrageous fluke", according to his rival Dave Harold, and took a 7–0 lead with further breaks of 67, 139 and 70. Harold responded with an 80 break and won another one to edge closer and end the first session 2–7. O'Sullivan won the match in the final session with a century of 100 and then half-centuries of 54 and 88 in the last two frames, for a 10–4 result. Mark Williams, the 2000 and 2003 champion, won the first four frames of his match against Anthony Hamilton, who then replied with a 115, but who would end up losing 1–10. "John Higgins has gone out, and now I hope Ronnie O'Sullivan, Stephen Hendry and Matthew Stevens go out and Willie Thorne (now retired) comes in!", Williams said afterwards.

Stephen Lee, winner of the 2006 Welsh Open during the season, took a 6–3 lead against Ali Carter into the final session, but then fell one frame behind at 7–8 after Carter won five frames in a row, the last of them with a century of 135. Lee then produced breaks of 61 and 62 to move to one away from victory and also took the final one after Carter failed to pot a long-distance red ball to win 10–8. 2004 quarter-finalist Joe Perry won the first frame against Ryan Day with a break of 97, but then lost seven on the trot. Going into the final session with a 7–2 lead, Day compiled breaks of 55 and 58 for a 10–3 victory. "I don't know if you can practice too hard but I left all my form on the practice table", said Perry.

=== Second round ===
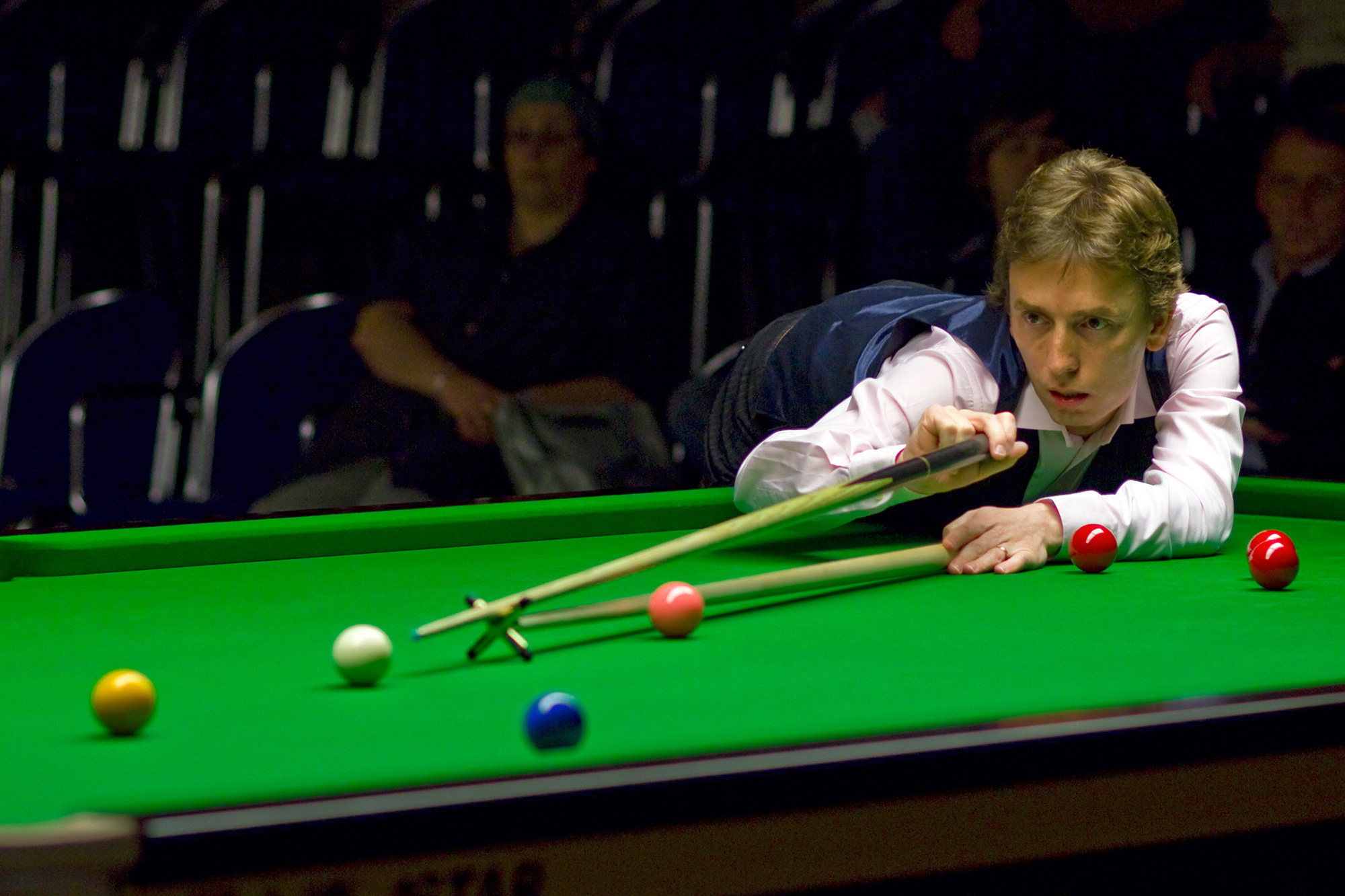
Ken Doherty (pictured in 2011) took the last five frames in a row to win 13–8 over Matthew Stevens.

The second round of the event was played as the best of 25 frames, held over three sessions, between 20 and 24 April. Robertson opened a three-frame gap against Lee with a century break of 109. Although Lee replied with two centuries of his own, Robertson was 10–6 ahead going into the final session. Robertson won 13–9 after the last six frames of the match were shared, with each player making another century. Murphy began his match against Davis with a century break and had an 8–3 lead, when the Crucible had to be evacuated due to a fire alarm. On the other table, Selby was playing Williams and was on a break of 26 when they were required to leave. Murphy eventually defeated Davis 13–7. Williams went into the final session with an 11–5 lead, then compiled an 85 break to put himself one away from victory and clinched a 13–8 win. Maguire, playing in the second round for the first time, lost six of the eight frames of the second session against Fu, who compiled centuries of 125, 118 and 101 for a 13–4 victory. Fu thanked Terry Griffiths, the 1979 champion and 1988 runner-up, for his coaching: "He's been helping me with a few things: cue action, the way I grip the cue, the approach to the shot, angles – and it all seems to be working quite well".

In a repeat of the 2000 Masters final, Doherty and Stevens were tied at eight frames each, but Doherty won five successive frames with breaks of 83, 63, 69 and 67 to advance into the quarter-finals. Dott had a four-frame lead going into the final session against Bond, whom he regarded as having a "similar style based on tactics rather than potting", and managed to preserve it and won 13–9. The 2004 quarter-finalist Gray took on Ebdon, who opened the match with a century of 107. Ebdon won the last nine frames of the match to seal a 13–2 victory. O'Sullivan, runner-up of the 2006 Masters during the season, faced Day, who had never made it to this stage of the World Championship before. O'Sullivan compiled in the sixth frame the highest break of the tournament with a 140, but Day, who miscued on various occasions during the match, took a 9–7 lead into the final session. O'Sullivan turned the match around with breaks of up to 68 and 75, and won 13–10.

=== Quarter-finals ===
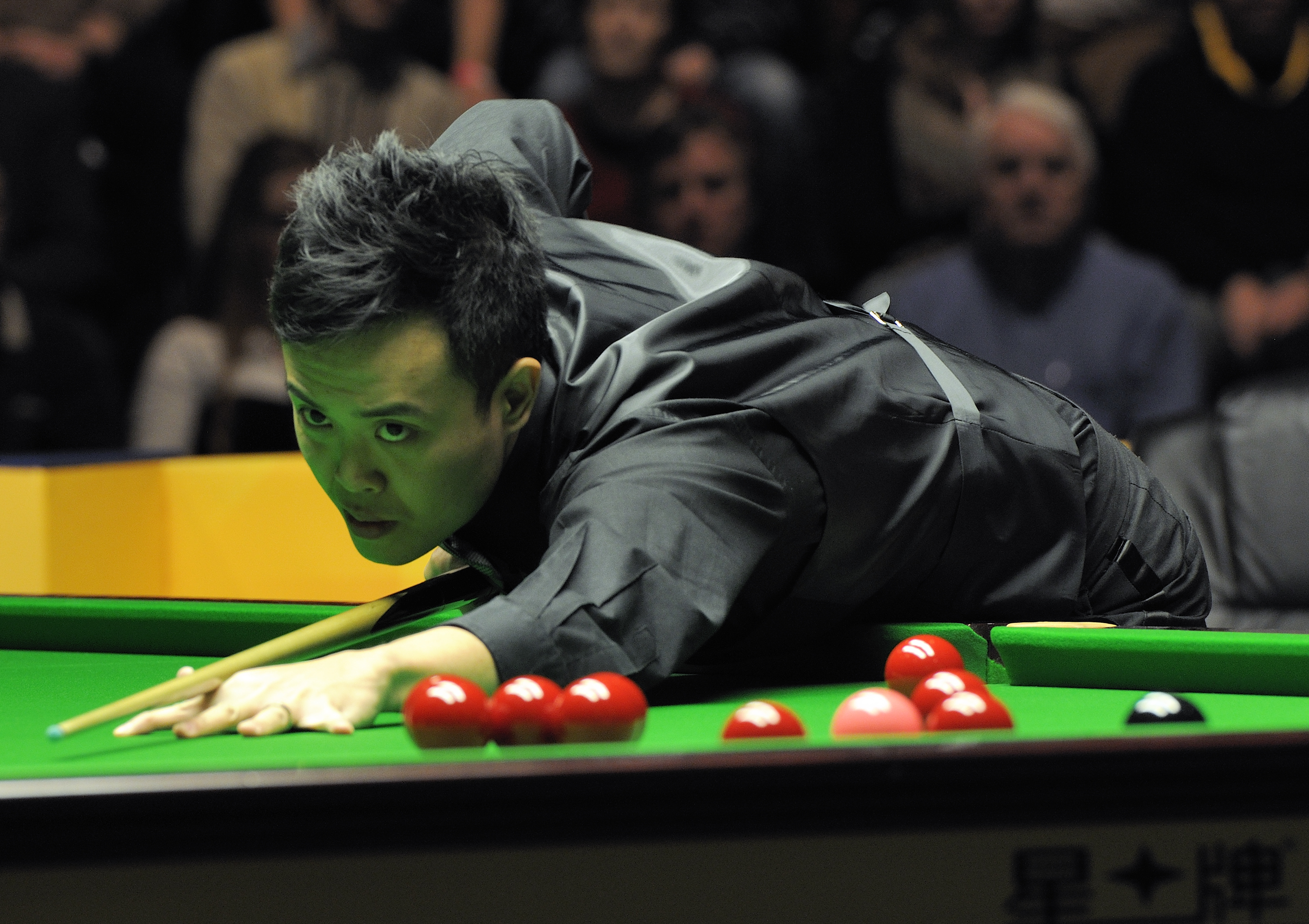
Marco Fu (pictured in 2013) won three frames on the spin to see Ken Doherty off and become the first player from Asia since James Wattana in 1997 to reach the semi-finals.

The quarter-finals of the event were played as the best of 25 frames, held over three sessions, between 25 and 26 April. Ebdon took a 7–0 lead against Murphy with breaks of 116, 64, 52 and 96, although Murphy managed to win the final frame of the session. The next morning, aided by breaks of 77, 113, and two breaks of 83, Murphy managed to pull back to 10–6. Each player went on to make a century as, for the second year in a row, Ebdon ousted the defending champion in the quarter-finals, having won over O'Sullivan in the previous edition. This also made Murphy the 13th first-time champion who failed to defend his title since the tournament moved to the Crucible in 1977, succumbing to what has been called the 'Crucible curse'. Fu, who compiled two centuries, and Doherty were tied at 8–8 at the beginning of the last session. The first four frames of the final session were shared, with Fu making a further century of 135, but Fu won the last three frames, including breaks of 60 and 75, to clinch victory. "I blew it. I can't grumble because I had my chances" Doherty said afterwards. In winning, Fu became the first player from Asia since Wattana in 1997 to reach the semi-finals.

Dott was 10–6 and also 12–8 ahead of Robertson, with only one more frame required to reach the semi-final. However, first time quarter-finalist Robertson then won the next four frames, including a 103 break, to level the match at 12–12 and take it to a deciding frame, which Dott won, after Robertson was left needing a snooker with only the pink and black remaining on the table and accidentally potted the pink instead of laying a snooker. Robertson said afterwards that he thought he was "one of the best players in the world" at the moment: "Obviously I have to start winning tournaments to prove that, but I don't think anyone can out-play me long-potting wise". Going into the evening session, O'Sullivan had a four-frame lead at 10–6 against Williams, who then took five of the next six frames, until O'Sullivan stopped the rot with a 90 break and put himself only one away from victory, which he clinched in the following one. Williams foresaw that O'Sullivan would go on to win the tournament, pointing out he looked "so confident".

=== Semi-finals ===
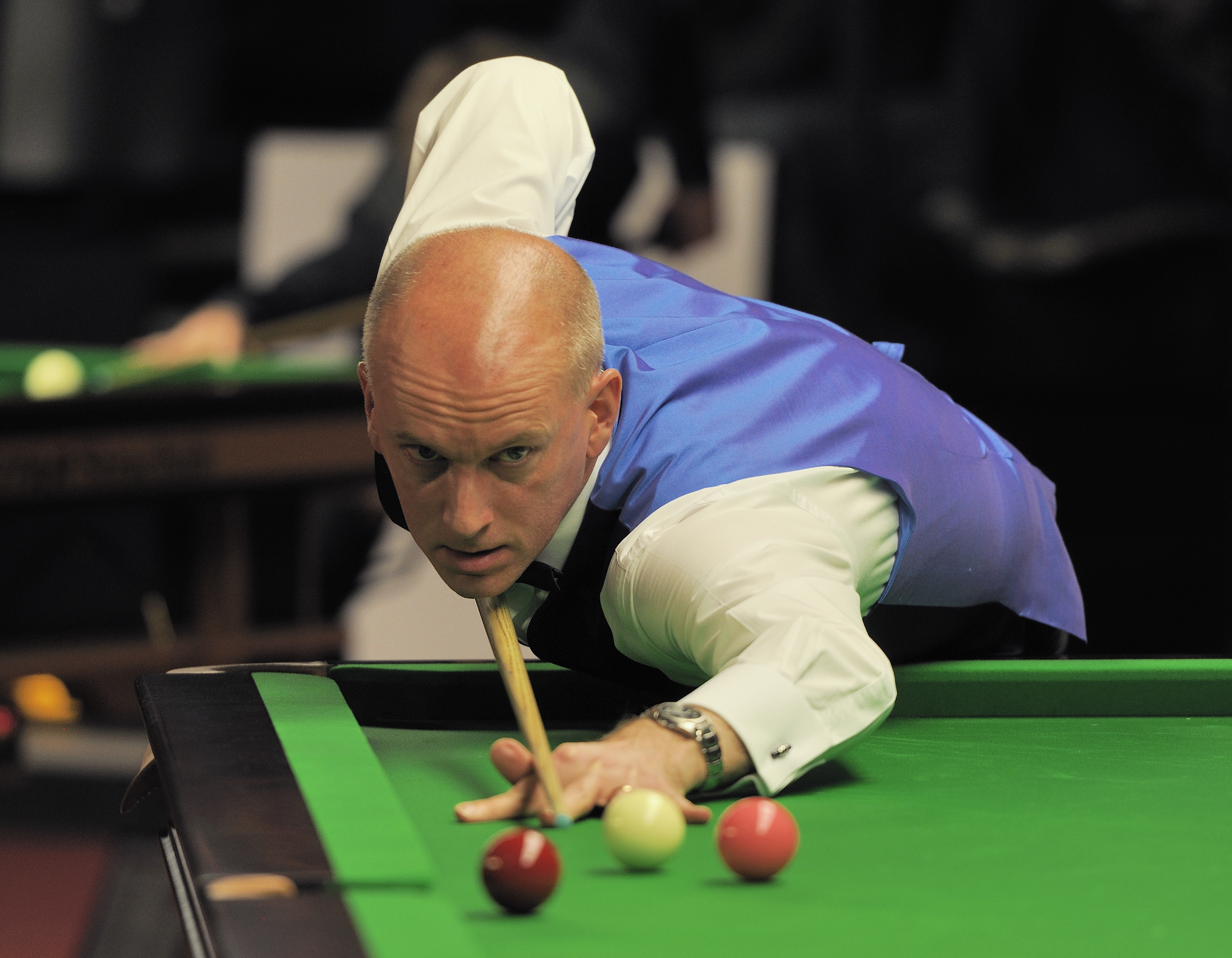
Peter Ebdon (pictured in 2014), the 2002 champion, took the deciding frame against first-time semi-finalist Marco Fu to book a place in the final.

The semi-finals were played as the best of 33 frames, held over four sessions, between 27 and 29 April. Fu, playing in his first ever World Championship semi-final, faced Ebdon. The first session, which at the end was shared between the players at four frames each, took over four hours of playing time. Members of the audience even complained and shouted it was "like watching paint dry". Clive Everton, writing for The Guardian, predicted "TV viewing figures would soon slump dramatically" if the same "funereal pace" were to affect every game, with one frame lasting 52 minutes and another one 46. Century breaks of 107, 101 and 122 put Ebdon 15–9 ahead, only two frames away from a place in the final. Fu, however, produced two centuries and further breaks of 68, 52 and 75 as he took six frames on the trot to level the match at 15–15. The match went into a decider, which Ebdon won for a 17–16 result, playing the final balls with tears in his eyes. "In all honesty, Marco deserved to win – it was such a gutsy comeback from him", he said afterwards.

Dott kicked off his semi-final against O'Sullivan with a 121 century break, but fell 3–5 behind at the conclusion of the first session. During the second session, with the scores tied at seven frames each, there was an incident with O'Sullivan's tip, which he seemed to take off himself. Despite this, he was awarded a 15-minute break for emergency repairs, after which he compiled a 124 break. Dott won all eight frames of the third session, including half-centuries of 92, 86 and 53, and went from 8–8 to 16–8. O'Sullivan narrowed the deficit winning three frames on the trot and making two 60 breaks along the way, but in the 28th frame, he left the final black hanging close to the pocket and Dott potted it to clinch the frame by one point and the match 17–11 to advance into the final.

=== Final ===
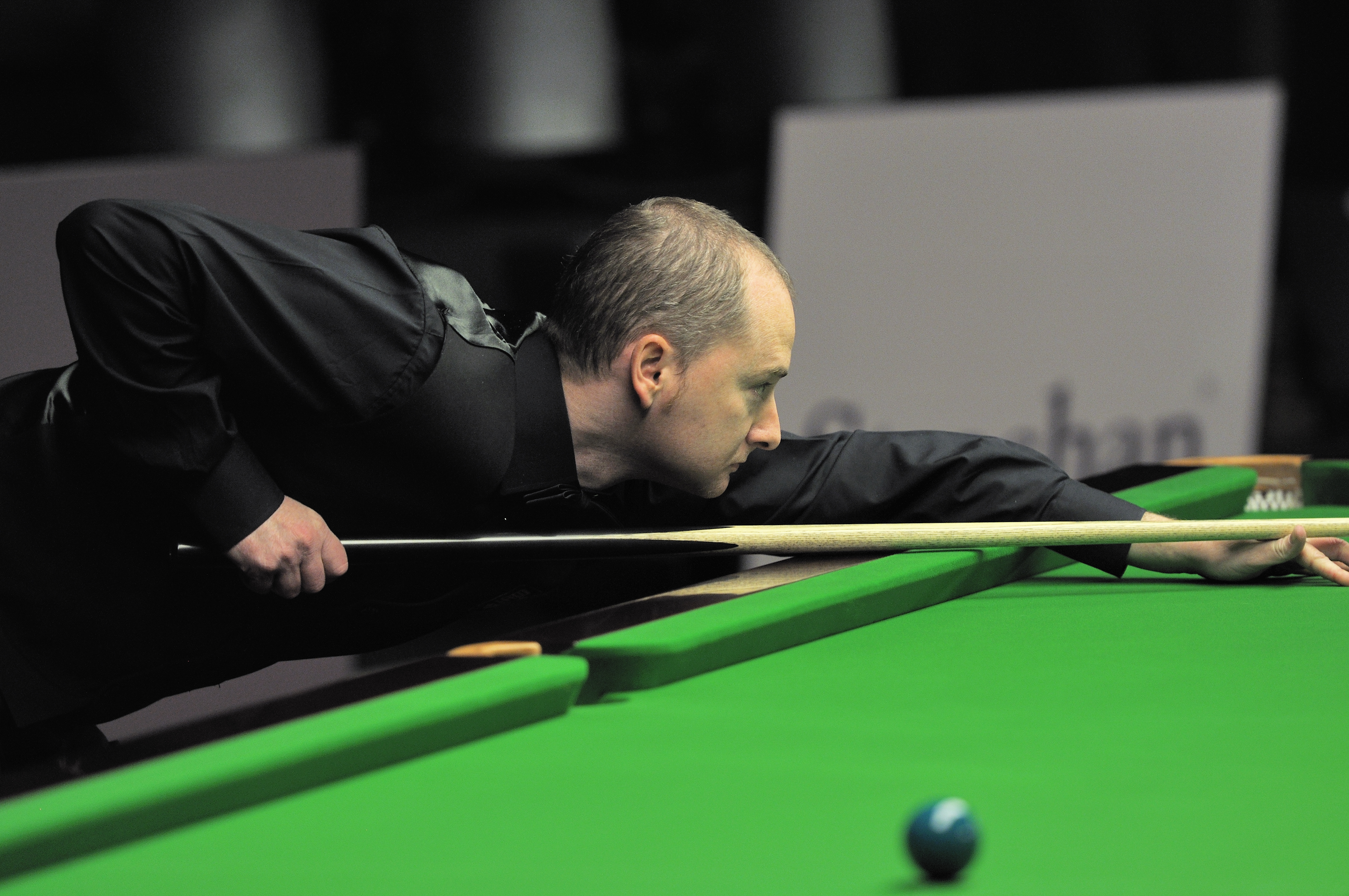
Graeme Dott (pictured in 2014) won 18–14 over Peter Ebdon in the final to claim his first ranking event victory.

The final was played as a best-of-35-frames, held over four sessions on 30 April and 1 and 2 May, between Ebdon and Dott. Ebdon was competing in his third World Championship final, having lost one and won the other one. He was the first player to reach the final without meeting a top 16 player, given that Murphy, albeit the top seed as the reigning champion, was not within the top 16. It was Dott's second appearance in the final, after being runner-up to O'Sullivan in 2004. Jan Verhaas took charge of his second world final, having officiated the 2003 final between Williams and Doherty. Ebdon took the first frame despite suffering a kick, and Dott's 62 break in the second was enough to beat the 53 made by Ebdon. With long bouts of tactical play from both players, the first session saw only six frames played, with a 4–2 lead for Dott. On the resumption, Dott increased his lead, winning four consecutive frames. Ebdon, however, took the fifth of the second session and also compiled an 89 break in the following one to narrow the deficit to 4–8. The first day's play continued until 12:45 am. Dott led 11‍–‍5, despite making a highest break of only 62.

A break of 56 at the beginning of the third session put Dott seven frames ahead. Ebdon replied with a break of 78, but Dott took the following one for a 13–6 lead. In the twentieth frame, Dott compiled a break of 62, but Ebdon then managed to snooker him. Although Dott could not escape at first, he successfully escaped and took the frame on the second attempt. In the following frame, Ebdon missed a black ball that allowed Dott to make a 65-point clearance. Dott also took the last frame of the third session for a 15–7 lead, three away from the title. The third session on the second day also finished after only six frames.

The fourth and final session of the final began with a break of 117 by Ebdon, the only century of the final. In the 24th frame, Dott missed the black off its spot when he was on a 51 break trying to counteract Ebdon's 34, and allowed him to get back to the table. The frame became the longest televised frame on record, lasting 74 minutes. It was won by Ebdon 66–59, reducing his deficit to 12–15. The following frame was won by Ebdon with a break of 84 in 11 minutes, the quickest of the final, which allowed him to move to only two frames away from Dott. Dott then took his first frame of the final session with a break of 66, but Ebdon replied and reduced the deficit to two once again at 14–16. The 31st frame featured breaks of 51 by Ebdon and 68 by Dott, who took it with a clearance to move to one away from victory and celebrated loudly. The score became 17–14 at 12:22 am, thus surpassing by fifty minutes the 1985 final between Davis and Dennis Taylor as the latest finish for a final at the Crucible.

Both players had chances to take the 32nd frame, but Dott, who went over to kiss the trophy before potting his last ball, clinched victory. It was the first time he won a ranking event, having been a runner-up on four occasions previously. Dott said afterwards that he "kept twitching" when Ebdon was coming back at him. "I knew I was playing too slowly and too negatively, so I decided to change something. I washed my face. I sped up my play. I was doing anything to give myself a chance", he added.

== Main draw ==
Shown below are the results for each round. The numbers in parentheses beside some of the players are their seeding.

First round Best of 19 frames
15 April
(England) Shaun Murphy (1)	10
(Thailand) James Wattana	4
15 & 16 April
(England) Steve Davis (16)	10
(England) Andy Hicks	4
19 & 20 April
(England) Jimmy White (9)	5
(England) David Gray	10
19 April
(England) Peter Ebdon (8)	10
(England) Michael Holt	8
17 & 18 April
(Wales) Matthew Stevens (5)	10
(Northern Ireland) Joe Swail	5
16 & 17 April
(Republic of Ireland) Ken Doherty (12)	10
(England) Barry Hawkins	1
18 April
(Scotland) Alan McManus (13)	3
(Hong Kong) Marco Fu	10
16 & 17 April
(Scotland) Stephen Maguire (4)	10
(England) Mark King	6
18 & 19 April
(Scotland) Stephen Hendry (3)	9
(England) Nigel Bond	10
15 & 16 April
(Scotland) Graeme Dott (14)	10
(England) John Parrott	3
15 & 16 April
(England) Stephen Lee (11)	10
(England) Ali Carter	8
17 April
(England) Paul Hunter (6)	5
(Australia) Neil Robertson	10
15 & 16 April
(Scotland) John Higgins (7)	4
(England) Mark Selby	10
17 & 18 April
(Wales) Mark Williams (10)	10
(England) Anthony Hamilton	1
19 & 20 April
(England) Joe Perry (15)	3
(Wales) Ryan Day	10
18 & 19 April
(England) Ronnie O'Sullivan (2)	10
(England) Dave Harold	4

Second round Best of 25 frames
20, 21 & 22 April
(England) Shaun Murphy (1)	13
(England) Steve Davis (16)	7
23 & 24 April
(England) David Gray	2
(England) Peter Ebdon (8)	13
22, 23 & 24 April
(Wales) Matthew Stevens (5)	8
(Republic of Ireland) Ken Doherty (12)	13
21 & 22 April
(Hong Kong) Marco Fu	13
(Scotland) Stephen Maguire (4)	4
22, 23 & 24 April
(England) Nigel Bond	9
(Scotland) Graeme Dott (14)	13
20 & 21 April
(England) Stephen Lee (11)	9
(Australia) Neil Robertson	13
21 & 22 April
(England) Mark Selby	8
(Wales) Mark Williams (10)	13
23 & 24 April
(Wales) Ryan Day	10
(England) Ronnie O'Sullivan (2)	13

Quarter-finals; Best of 25 frames
25 & 26 April
(England) Shaun Murphy (1)	7
(England) Peter Ebdon (8)	13
25 & 26 April
(Republic of Ireland) Ken Doherty (12)	10
(Hong Kong) Marco Fu	13
25 & 26 April
(Scotland) Graeme Dott (14)	13
(Australia) Neil Robertson	12
25 & 26 April
(Wales) Mark Williams (10)	11
(England) Ronnie O'Sullivan (2)	13

Semi-finals; Best of 33 frames
27, 28 & 29 April
(England) Peter Ebdon (8)	17
(Hong Kong) Marco Fu	16
27, 28 & 29 April
(Scotland) Graeme Dott (14)	17
(England) Ronnie O'Sullivan (2)	11

Final; Best of 35 frames
30 April 1 & 2 May
(England) Peter Ebdon (8)	14
(Scotland) Graeme Dott (14)	18

=== Final: frame scores ===
Final (Best of 35 frames) Crucible Theatre, Sheffield, 30 April 1 & 2 May 2006. Referee: Jan Verhaas.
Peter Ebdon (8)
England
14–18
Graeme Dott (14)
Scotland
79–12, 53–62, 1–91, 48–70, 20–71, 67–31, 6–78, 20–53, 20–53, 16–63, 66–25, 124–6, 47–72, 65–51, 5–61, 16–92, 0–75, 100–0, 67–44, 41–75, 31–90, 49–70, 117–22, 66–51, 67–29, 70–38, 66–59, 84–0, 16–78, 99–17, 61–69, 31–70
Century breaks: 1 (Ebdon 1)

Highest break Ebdon: 117
Highest break Dott: 68

79–12, 53–62, 1–91, 48–70, 20–71, 67–31, 6–78, 20–53, 20–53, 16–63, 66–25, 124–6, 47–72, 65–51, 5–61, 16–92, 0–75, 100–0, 67–44, 41–75, 31–90, 49–70, 117–22, 66–51, 67–29, 70–38, 66–59, 84–0, 16–78, 99–17, 61–69, 31–70
(Scotland) Graeme Dott wins the 2006 888.com World Snooker Championship

== Qualification ==
=== Preliminary qualifying ===
The preliminary qualifying rounds for the tournament were for WPBSA members not on the Main Tour and took place on 6 and 7 January 2006 at Pontin's in Prestatyn, Wales.

Round 1

(India) David Singh	w/d–w/o	(England) Ali Bassiri
(England) Del Smith	4–5	(England) Garry Baldrey
(England) Phil Seaton	5–2	(Northern Ireland) Dermot McGlinchey
(England) Les Dodd	2–5	(England) Tony Knowles
(England) Neil Selman	5–2	(England) Stephen Ormerod
(England) Ian Stark	2–5	(Netherlands) Gerrit bij de Leij

Round 2

(Netherlands) Stefan Mazrocis	5–0	(England) Ali Bassiri
(Cyprus) Mehmet Husnu	5–2	(England) Garry Baldrey
(England) Phil Seaton	0–5	(England) Tony Knowles
(England) Neil Selman	0–5	(Netherlands) Gerrit bij de Leij

Round 3

(Netherlands) Stefan Mazrocis	5–2	(Cyprus) Mehmet Husnu
(England) Tony Knowles	3–5	(Netherlands) Gerrit bij de Leij

=== Qualifying ===
The qualifying rounds 1–3 for the tournament took place between 8 and 13 January 2006 at Pontin's in Prestatyn, Wales. Players were given byes based on their world rankings. The final round of qualifying took place between 14 and 15 March 2006 at the same venue.

Round 1 Best of 19 frames
(England) Joe Jogia	10
(Scotland) Hugh Abernethy	3
(China) Ding Junhui	10
(England) Stuart Mann	1
(England) Nick Dyson	10
(Scotland) James McBain	8
(Republic of Ireland) David McDonnell	w/o
(Malaysia) Moh Keen Ho	w/d
(England) David Roe	10
(England) Gary Wilkinson	9
(England) Simon Bedford	6
(Malta) Alex Borg	10
(Republic of Ireland) Leo Fernandez	8
(England) Judd Trump	10
(Scotland) Scott MacKenzie	10
(Bahrain) Habib Subah	3
(England) Alfie Burden	10
(Belgium) Bjorn Haneveer	9
(Wales) Darren Morgan	8
(England) David Gilbert	10
(England) Sean Storey	4
(Netherlands) Gerrit bij de Leij	10
(England) Adam Davies	7
(Northern Ireland) Mark Allen	10
(Wales) Paul Davies	10
(China) Jin Long	9
(England) Andrew Norman	9
(England) Gary Wilson	10
(England) Paul Wykes	10
(Netherlands) Stefan Mazrocis	8
(Republic of Ireland) Joe Delaney	10
(China) Liang Wenbo	5

Round 2 Best of 19 frames
(England) Jamie Cope	10
(England) Joe Jogia	7
(England) Brian Morgan	7
(China) Ding Junhui	10
(England) Matthew Couch	10
(England) Nick Dyson	6
(England) Tom Ford	10
(Republic of Ireland) David McDonnell	3
(England) Lee Spick	10
(England) David Roe	6
(England) Jimmy Michie	8
(Malta) Alex Borg	10
(England) Mike Dunn	10
(England) Judd Trump	7
(Scotland) Marcus Campbell	10
(Scotland) Scott MacKenzie	3
(England) Rod Lawler	10
(England) Alfie Burden	7
(Scotland) Jamie Burnett	8
(England) David Gilbert	10
(Finland) Robin Hull	10
(Netherlands) Gerrit bij de Leij	6
(England) Justin Astley	3
(Northern Ireland) Mark Allen	10
(Pakistan) Shokat Ali	10
(Wales) Paul Davies	6
(England) James Tatton	10
(England) Gary Wilson	8
(Wales) Lee Walker	2
(England) Paul Wykes	10
(England) Chris Norbury	6
(Republic of Ireland) Joe Delaney	10

Round 3 Best of 19 frames
(Republic of Ireland) Michael Judge	10
(England) Jamie Cope	4
(Scotland) Drew Henry	9
(China) Ding Junhui	10
(Republic of Ireland) Fergal O'Brien	10
(England) Matthew Couch	4
(England) Dave Harold	10
(England) Tom Ford	8
(England) Ricky Walden	8
(England) Lee Spick	10
(England) Mark Selby	10
(Malta) Alex Borg	4
(England) Rory McLeod	8
(England) Mike Dunn	10
(England) Stuart Bingham	10
(Scotland) Marcus Campbell	7
(Wales) Dominic Dale	6
(England) Rod Lawler	10
(Malta) Tony Drago	7
(England) David Gilbert	10
(England) Mark Davis	10
(Finland) Robin Hull	7
(Northern Ireland) Patrick Wallace	6
(Northern Ireland) Mark Allen	10
(Northern Ireland) Joe Swail	10
(Pakistan) Shokat Ali	5
(Northern Ireland) Gerard Greene	10
(England) James Tatton	4
(England) Adrian Gunnell	10
(England) Paul Wykes	3
(England) Stuart Pettman	10
(Republic of Ireland) Joe Delaney	8

Round 4 Best of 19 frames
(England) Ali Carter	10
(Republic of Ireland) Michael Judge	5
(England) Barry Hawkins	10
(China) Ding Junhui	6
(Hong Kong) Marco Fu	10
(Republic of Ireland) Fergal O'Brien	7
(England) Ian McCulloch	9
(England) Dave Harold	10
(England) John Parrott	10
(England) Lee Spick	9
(England) Robert Milkins	4
(England) Mark Selby	10
(England) Nigel Bond	10
(England) Mike Dunn	0
(Wales) Ryan Day	10
(England) Stuart Bingham	7
(England) Anthony Hamilton	10
(England) Rod Lawler	8
(Thailand) James Wattana	10
(England) David Gilbert	6
(England) David Gray	10
(England) Mark Davis	9
(England) Andy Hicks	10
(Northern Ireland) Mark Allen	7
(England) Barry Pinches	8
(Northern Ireland) Joe Swail	10
(Australia) Neil Robertson	10
(Northern Ireland) Gerard Greene	6
(England) Mark King	10
(England) Adrian Gunnell	5
(England) Michael Holt	10
(England) Stuart Pettman	2

== Century breaks ==
=== Televised stage centuries ===
There were 46 century breaks in the televised stage of the World Championship. The highest was a 140 made by O'Sullivan.

- 140, 139, 124, 109, 106, 100 – Ronnie O'Sullivan
- 137 – Mark Williams
- 135, 112 – Ali Carter
- 135, 125, 121, 118, 110, 103, 101, 100 – Marco Fu
- 135, 113, 110 – Stephen Lee
- 123, 122, 110 – Mark Selby
- 122, 117, 116, 112, 107, 107, 101 – Peter Ebdon
- 121 – Graeme Dott
- 119 – John Higgins
- 115 – Anthony Hamilton
- 113, 106 – Shaun Murphy
- 112, 106, 103 – Matthew Stevens
- 109 – David Gray
- 109, 109, 106, 103, 102 – Neil Robertson
- 104 – Ryan Day
- 102 – Michael Holt

=== Qualifying stage centuries ===
There were 52 century breaks in the qualifying stage of the World Championship:

- 147 – Robert Milkins
- 141, 100 – Paul Wykes
- 141 – Jamie Burnett
- 140 – James Wattana
- 138, 113, 108 – Mark Selby
- 138 – Alfie Burden
- 135 – David Gilbert
- 132, 124, 120, 101, 100 – Mark Allen
- 132 – Robin Hull
- 132 – Gerard Greene
- 130, 130, 124, 104, 100 – Ding Junhui
- 125 – Shokat Ali
- 124 – Joe Jogia
- 124 – Joe Swail
- 122, 119, 102, 101 – Tom Ford
- 120 – Mark King
- 118, 101 – Mark Davis
- 117 – Mike Dunn
- 117 – Neil Robertson
- 116 – John Parrott
- 113 – Gerrit bij de Leij
- 111 – Paul Davies
- 110 – Ricky Walden
- 109 – Adrian Gunnell
- 107 – Stefan Mazrocis
- 106 – Barry Hawkins
- 105, 102 – Judd Trump
- 105 – Alex Borg
- 104 – James McBain
- 103, 102 – Lee Spick
- 103, 100 – Fergal O'Brien
- 103 – Dave Harold
- 102 – Nick Dyson
- 101 – Jin Long
- 100 – Barry Pinches
