= 2006 Welsh Open (snooker) =

Tournament information
- Dates: 27 February – 5 March 2006
- Venue: Newport Centre
- City: Newport
- Country: Wales
- Organisation: WPBSA
- Format: Ranking event
- Total prize fund: £225,000
- Winner's share: £35,000
- Highest break: Robert Milkins (ENG) (144)

Final
- Champion: Stephen Lee (ENG)
- Runner-up: Shaun Murphy (ENG)
- Score: 9–4

The 2006 Welsh Open was a professional ranking snooker tournament that took place between 27 February and 5 March at the Newport Centre in Newport, Wales.

Ronnie O'Sullivan was the defending champion, but he lost his last 32 match against Ian McCulloch.

Stephen Lee won his fourth ranking title by defeating World Champion Shaun Murphy 9–4.

== Tournament summary ==
Defending champion Ronnie O'Sullivan was the number 1 seed with World Champion Shaun Murphy seeded 2. The remaining places were allocated to players based on the world rankings.

== Prize fund ==
The breakdown of prize money for this year is shown below:

- Winner: £35,000
- Runner-up: £17,500
- Semi-final: £8,750
- Quarter-final: £6,500
- Last 16: £4,275
- Last 32: £2,750
- Last 48: £1,725
- Last 64: £1,325
- Highest break: £2,000
- Maximum break: £20,000
- Total: £225,000

== Main draw ==
Last 48; Best of 9 frames
17	(England) Ian McCulloch	5
44	(England) Dave Harold	3
25	(England) Robert Milkins	5
(England) Judd Trump	3
23	(England) Michael Holt	5
33	(Wales) Dominic Dale	2
18	(England) Anthony Hamilton	5
43	(Republic of Ireland) Fergal O'Brien	3
21	(England) Mark King	4
39	(Northern Ireland) Joe Swail	5
26	(England) Nigel Bond	0
(China) Liang Wenbo	5
24	(Hong Kong) Marco Fu	2
34	(Scotland) Drew Henry	5
27	(Australia) Neil Robertson	3
38	(England) Mark Selby	5
29	(England) Barry Hawkins	5
60	(England) David Roe	4
28	(England) John Parrott	1
32	(Wales) Ryan Day	5
31	(Thailand) James Wattana	5
47	(England) Ricky Walden	4
19	(England) Barry Pinches	4
68	(Scotland) Scott MacKenzie	5
22	(England) David Gray	4
41	(England) Mark Davis	5
20	(England) Ali Carter	4
69	(England) Alfie Burden	5
21	(Australia) Quinten Hann	w/d
(England) Jamie Cope	w/o
30	(England) Andy Hicks	5
49	(Northern Ireland) Patrick Wallace	3

Last 32; Best of 9 frames
1	(England) Ronnie O'Sullivan	1
17	(England) Ian McCulloch	5
13	(Scotland) Alan McManus	4
25	(England) Robert Milkins	5
12	(Republic of Ireland) Ken Doherty	5
23	(England) Michael Holt	4
6	(England) Paul Hunter	3
18	(England) Anthony Hamilton	5
8	(England) Peter Ebdon	0
39	(Northern Ireland) Joe Swail	5
14	(Scotland) Graeme Dott	5
(China) Liang Wenbo	3
11	(England) Stephen Lee	5
34	(Scotland) Drew Henry	2
4	(Scotland) Stephen Maguire	3
38	(England) Mark Selby	5
3	(Scotland) Stephen Hendry	3
29	(England) Barry Hawkins	5
9	(England) Jimmy White	0
32	(Wales) Ryan Day	5
15	(England) Joe Perry	2
31	(Thailand) James Wattana	5
7	(Scotland) John Higgins	5
68	(Scotland) Scott MacKenzie	2
5	(Wales) Matthew Stevens	5
41	(England) Mark Davis	0
10	(Wales) Mark Williams	5
69	(England) Alfie Burden	3
16	(England) Steve Davis	4
(England) Jamie Cope	5
2	(England) Shaun Murphy	5
30	(England) Andy Hicks	3

Last 16; Best of 9 frames
17	(England) Ian McCulloch	5
25	(England) Robert Milkins	3
12	(Republic of Ireland) Ken Doherty	3
18	(England) Anthony Hamilton	5
39	(Northern Ireland) Joe Swail	2
14	(Scotland) Graeme Dott	5
11	(England) Stephen Lee	5
38	(England) Mark Selby	2
29	(England) Barry Hawkins	5
32	(Wales) Ryan Day	2
31	(Thailand) James Wattana	5
7	(Scotland) John Higgins	4
5	(Wales) Matthew Stevens	1
10	(Wales) Mark Williams	5
(England) Jamie Cope	4
2	(England) Shaun Murphy	5

Quarter-finals; Best of 9 frames
17	(England) Ian McCulloch	2
18	(England) Anthony Hamilton	5
14	(Scotland) Graeme Dott	2
11	(England) Stephen Lee	5
29	(England) Barry Hawkins	5
31	(Thailand) James Wattana	3
10	(Wales) Mark Williams	2
2	(England) Shaun Murphy	5

Semi-finals; Best of 11 frames
18	(England) Anthony Hamilton	5
11	(England) Stephen Lee	6
29	(England) Barry Hawkins	1
2	(England) Shaun Murphy	6

Final; Best of 17 frames
11	(England) Stephen Lee	9
2	(England) Shaun Murphy	4

== Final ==
Final: Best of 17 frames. Referee: Eirian Williams. Newport Centre, Newport, Wales, 5 March 2006.
Stephen Lee (11); England	9–4	Shaun Murphy (2); England
Afternoon: 86–6, 74–0, 90–30, 120–0 (120), 47–75, 40–61, 0–90, 64–52 (Murphy 52); Evening: 88–0 (62), 39–64, 84–13, 64–52 (Murphy 52), 83–0 (71)
120	Highest break	52
1	Century breaks	0
3	50+ breaks	2

== Qualifying ==
Qualifying for the tournament took place at Pontin's in Prestatyn, Wales between 24 January and 26 January 2006.

Round 1 Best of 9 frames
(England) Andrew Norman	w/o
(Malaysia) Moh Keen Ho	w/d
(England) Rod Lawler	3
(England) Judd Trump	5
(Wales) Darren Morgan	5
(Scotland) Hugh Abernethy	3
(England) Paul Wykes	0
(England) Gary Wilson	5
(England) Adam Davies	2
(England) Gary Wilkinson	5
(England) Sean Storey	0
(China) Liang Wenbo	5
(Wales) Paul Davies	5
(England) Nick Dyson	2
(Republic of Ireland) Joe Delaney	5
(Malta) Alex Borg	2
(England) David Roe	5
(Scotland) James McBain	4
(Republic of Ireland) Leo Fernandez	2
(Northern Ireland) Mark Allen	5
(China) Ding Junhui	w/o
(England) Steve James	w/d
(Scotland) Scott MacKenzie	w/o
(China) Jin Long	w/d
(Republic of Ireland) David McDonnell	3
(Belgium) Bjorn Haneveer	5
(England) Alfie Burden	5
(England) Stuart Mann	3
(England) Simon Bedford	2
(England) David Gilbert	5
(England) Joe Jogia	5
(Bahrain) Habib Subah	1

Round 2 Best of 9 frames
(England) James Tatton	2
(England) Andrew Norman	5
(Wales) Lee Walker	1
(England) Judd Trump	5
(England) Chris Norbury	5
(Wales) Darren Morgan	4
(Pakistan) Shokat Ali	3
(England) Gary Wilson	5
(England) Matthew Couch	5
(England) Gary Wilkinson	1
(Scotland) Jamie Burnett	0
(China) Liang Wenbo	5
(England) Justin Astley	5
(Wales) Paul Davies	3
(England) Tom Ford	5
(Republic of Ireland) Joe Delaney	4
(England) Lee Spick	4
(England) David Roe	5
(England) Jimmy Michie	1
(Northern Ireland) Mark Allen	5
(Finland) Robin Hull	0
(China) Ding Junhui	5
(Scotland) Marcus Campbell	3
(Scotland) Scott MacKenzie	5
(England) Mike Dunn	4
(Belgium) Bjorn Haneveer	5
(England) Brian Morgan	3
(England) Alfie Burden	5
(England) Jamie Cope	5
(England) David Gilbert	3
(Northern Ireland) Patrick Wallace	5
(England) Joe Jogia	1

Round 3 Best of 9 frames
(England) Dave Harold	5
(England) Andrew Norman	1
(England) Adrian Gunnell	1
(England) Judd Trump	5
(Wales) Dominic Dale	5
(England) Chris Norbury	1
(Republic of Ireland) Fergal O'Brien	5
(England) Gary Wilson	3
(Northern Ireland) Joe Swail	5
(England) Matthew Couch	1
(England) Rory McLeod	3
(China) Liang Wenbo	5
(Scotland) Drew Henry	5
(England) Justin Astley	2
(England) Mark Selby	5
(England) Tom Ford	2
(England) Stuart Pettman	3
(England) David Roe	5
(Wales) Ryan Day	5
(Northern Ireland) Mark Allen	3
(England) Ricky Walden	5
(China) Ding Junhui	3
(Malta) Tony Drago	3
(Scotland) Scott MacKenzie	5
(England) Mark Davis	5
(Belgium) Bjorn Haneveer	4
(Republic of Ireland) Michael Judge	4
(England) Alfie Burden	5
(England) Stuart Bingham	3
(England) Jamie Cope	5
(Northern Ireland) Gerard Greene	2
(Northern Ireland) Patrick Wallace	5

== Century breaks ==
=== Qualifying stage centuries ===
- 139 – Michael Judge
- 135, 125 – Scott MacKenzie
- 135, 104 – Lee Spick
- 131, 106, 104 – Ding Junhui
- 130, 124, 100 – Dave Gilbert
- 130 – Matthew Couch
- 124 – Dominic Dale
- 124 – Ricky Walden
- 119 – Fergal O'Brien
- 112, 108 – Stuart Bingham
- 111, 102 – Jamie Cope
- 111 – Patrick Wallace
- 106 – Dave Harold
- 103 – Andrew Norman
- 102 – Mark Allen
- 100 – David Roe

=== Televised stage centuries ===
- 144 – Robert Milkins
- 141 – Dave Harold
- 138 – Matthew Stevens
- 135, 122, 113, 100 – Ryan Day
- 134, 120, 106, 102 – Shaun Murphy
- 133 – Stephen Hendry
- 131 – Steve Davis
- 128, 104, 102 – Barry Hawkins
- 122, 110 – Ian McCulloch
- 120, 100 – Stephen Lee
- 120 – Joe Perry
- 111 – Neil Robertson
- 107 – Liang Wenbo
- 103 – Scott MacKenzie
- 100 – Anthony Hamilton
- 100 – John Higgins
