= 2005 Grand Prix (snooker) =

Royal London Watches Grand Prix
Tournament information
- Dates: 8–16 October 2005
- Venue: Guild Hall
- City: Preston
- Country: England
- Organisation: WPBSA
- Format: Ranking event
- Total prize fund: £400,000
- Winner's share: £60,000
- Highest break: Barry Hawkins (ENG) (145)

Final
- Champion: John Higgins (SCO)
- Runner-up: Ronnie O'Sullivan (ENG)
- Score: 9–2

The 2005 Royal London Watches Grand Prix was a professional ranking snooker tournament that took place between 8 and 16 October 2005 at the Guild Hall in Preston, England.

John Higgins won in the final 9–2 against Ronnie O'Sullivan. In the final, Higgins set two records: His century breaks in the seventh, eighth, ninth and tenth frames marked the first time a player had ever recorded centuries in four consecutive frames in a match during a ranking tournament. He scored 494 points without reply, the greatest number in any professional snooker tournament, until Ding Junhui made 495 points without reply against Stephen Hendry in the league stage of the 2007 Premier League.

== Prize fund ==
The breakdown of prize money for this year is shown below:

Winner: £60,000
Runner-up: £30,000
Semi-final: £15,000
Quarter-final: £11,000
Last 16: £7,000
Last 32: £5,000
Last 64: £3,000

Highest break: £4,000
Maximum break: £20,000

Total: £400,000

== Main draw ==
Round 1 Best of 9 frames
1	(England) Ronnie O'Sullivan	5
(Belgium) Bjorn Haneveer	3
18	(England) Anthony Hamilton	5
(England) Joe Jogia	1
20	(England) Ali Carter	3
(Northern Ireland) Joe Swail	5
12	(Republic of Ireland) Ken Doherty	5
(England) David Roe	2
9	(England) Jimmy White	5
(England) Mike Dunn	2
22	(Australia) Quinten Hann	w/d
(England) Ricky Walden	w/o
19	(England) Barry Pinches	5
(England) Tom Ford	2
6	(England) Paul Hunter	4
(England) Rory McLeod	5
8	(England) Peter Ebdon	5
(England) Jimmy Michie	3
30	(England) Barry Hawkins	5
(Malta) Tony Drago	1
32	(Thailand) James Wattana	2
(England) Chris Norbury	5
15	(England) Joe Perry	3
(England) Jamie Cope	5
13	(Scotland) Alan McManus	4
(Wales) Darren Morgan	5
24	(England) Michael Holt	5
(England) Rod Lawler	2
28	(Australia) Neil Robertson	1
(England) Andrew Norman	5
4	(Scotland) Stephen Maguire	3
(Republic of Ireland) Michael Judge	5
3	(Scotland) Stephen Hendry	5
(Wales) Dominic Dale	1
21	(England) Mark King	5
(England) Stuart Mann	1
29	(England) John Parrott	3
(England) Adrian Gunnell	5
11	(England) Stephen Lee	0
(Northern Ireland) Gerard Greene	5
14	(Scotland) Graeme Dott	2
(England) Stuart Pettman	5
25	(Hong Kong) Marco Fu	1
(Wales) Lee Walker	5
23	(England) David Gray	5
(Northern Ireland) Mark Allen	2
5	(Wales) Matthew Stevens	4
(England) Dave Harold	5
7	(Scotland) John Higgins	5
(Wales) Paul Davies	3
17	(England) Ian McCulloch	5
(Finland) Robin Hull	1
27	(England) Nigel Bond	5
(Wales) Ryan Day	1
16	(England) Steve Davis	5
(England) Gary Wilson	2
10	(Wales) Mark Williams	3
(Republic of Ireland) Fergal O'Brien	5
26	(England) Robert Milkins	3
(England) Stuart Bingham	5
31	(England) Andy Hicks	5
(England) Sean Storey	3
2	(England) Shaun Murphy	5
(England) Mark Selby	2

Round 2 Best of 9 frames
1	(England) Ronnie O'Sullivan	5
18	(England) Anthony Hamilton	2
(Northern Ireland) Joe Swail	5
12	(Republic of Ireland) Ken Doherty	4
9	(England) Jimmy White	5
(England) Ricky Walden	2
19	(England) Barry Pinches	5
(England) Rory McLeod	4
8	(England) Peter Ebdon	3
30	(England) Barry Hawkins	5
(England) Chris Norbury	2
(England) Jamie Cope	5
(Wales) Darren Morgan	1
24	(England) Michael Holt	5
(England) Andrew Norman	5
(Republic of Ireland) Michael Judge	1
3	(Scotland) Stephen Hendry	5
21	(England) Mark King	3
(England) Adrian Gunnell	2
(Northern Ireland) Gerard Greene	5
(England) Stuart Pettman	5
(Wales) Lee Walker	3
23	(England) David Gray	5
(England) Dave Harold	2
7	(Scotland) John Higgins	5
17	(England) Ian McCulloch	2
27	(England) Nigel Bond	2
16	(England) Steve Davis	5
(Republic of Ireland) Fergal O'Brien	2
(England) Stuart Bingham	5
31	(England) Andy Hicks	2
2	(England) Shaun Murphy	5

Round 3 Best of 9 frames
1	(England) Ronnie O'Sullivan	5
(Northern Ireland) Joe Swail	2
9	(England) Jimmy White	4
19	(England) Barry Pinches	5
30	(England) Barry Hawkins	5
(England) Jamie Cope	4
24	(England) Michael Holt	5
(England) Andrew Norman	4
3	(Scotland) Stephen Hendry	5
(Northern Ireland) Gerard Greene	4
(England) Stuart Pettman	4
23	(England) David Gray	5
7	(Scotland) John Higgins	5
16	(England) Steve Davis	1
(England) Stuart Bingham	5
2	(England) Shaun Murphy	4

Quarter-finals; Best of 9 frames
1	(England) Ronnie O'Sullivan	5
19	(England) Barry Pinches	2
30	(England) Barry Hawkins	5
24	(England) Michael Holt	1
3	(Scotland) Stephen Hendry	5
23	(England) David Gray	1
7	(Scotland) John Higgins	5
(England) Stuart Bingham	1

Semi-finals; Best of 11 frames
1	(England) Ronnie O'Sullivan	6
30	(England) Barry Hawkins	5
3	(Scotland) Stephen Hendry	4
7	(Scotland) John Higgins	6

Final; Best of 17 frames
1	(England) Ronnie O'Sullivan	2
7	(Scotland) John Higgins	9

== Final ==
Final: Best of 17 frames. Referee: Johan Oomen. Guild Hall, Preston, England, 16 October 2005.
Ronnie O'Sullivan (1); England	2–9	John Higgins (7); Scotland
Afternoon: 0–76 (68), 16–76 (67), 69–31 (69), 90–28 (62), 4–88, 60–70 (64), 5–103 (103), 0–104 (104); Evening: 0–138 (138), 0–128 (128), 49–67
69	Highest break	138
0	Century breaks	4
2	50+ breaks	7

== Qualifying ==
Qualifying for the tournament took place between 27 and 28 September 2005 at Pontin's in Prestatyn, Wales. All matches were best of 9 frames.

(Pakistan) Shokat Ali	1–5	(Belgium) Bjorn Haneveer
(England) Justin Astley	1–5	(England) Joe Jogia
(Northern Ireland) Joe Swail	5–1	(China) Jin Long
(Northern Ireland) Patrick Wallace	3–5	(England) David Roe
(England) Mike Dunn	5–2	(Republic of Ireland) David McDonnell
(England) Ricky Walden	5–1	(Scotland) Hugh Abernethy
(England) Tom Ford	5–3	(China) Ding Junhui
(England) Rory McLeod	5–2	(China) Liang Wenbo
(England) Jimmy Michie	5–0	(Bahrain) Habib Subah
(Malta) Tony Drago	5–2	(England) Steve James
(England) Chris Norbury	5–2	(England) Simon Bedford
(England) Jamie Cope	5–1	(England) Alfie Burden
(Scotland) Jamie Burnett	3–5	(Wales) Darren Morgan
(England) Matthew Couch	4–5	(England) Rod Lawler
(Scotland) Marcus Campbell	4–5	(England) Andrew Norman
(Republic of Ireland) Michael Judge	5–1	(England) Gary Wilkinson

(Wales) Dominic Dale	5–1	(Scotland) James McBain
(Scotland) Drew Henry	4–5	(England) Stuart Mann
(England) Adrian Gunnell	5–4	(Scotland) Scott MacKenzie
(Northern Ireland) Gerard Greene	5–1	(Malta) Alex Borg
(England) Stuart Pettman	5–4	(Republic of Ireland) Leo Fernandez
(Wales) Lee Walker	5–3	(England) Adam Davies
(England) James Tatton	0–5	(Northern Ireland) Mark Allen
(England) Dave Harold	5–0	(Republic of Ireland) Joe Delaney
(England) Lee Spick	1–5	(Wales) Paul Davies
(Finland) Robin Hull	5–4	(England) Nick Dyson
(Wales) Ryan Day	5–0	(Malaysia) Moh Keen Ho
(England) Mark Davis	3–5	(England) Gary Wilson
(Republic of Ireland) Fergal O'Brien	5–2	(England) Judd Trump
(England) Stuart Bingham	5–2	(England) David Gilbert
(England) Brian Morgan	1–5	(England) Sean Storey
(England) Mark Selby	5–1	(England) Paul Wykes

== Century breaks ==
=== Qualifying stage centuries ===
- 136 – Patrick Wallace
- 136 – Dominic Dale
- 130, 118 – Ding Junhui
- 125 – Stuart Bingham
- 122 – Andrew Norman
- 121 – Jamie Burnett
- 114 – Matthew Couch
- 113 – Chris Norbury

=== Televised stage centuries ===
- 145, 141, 123 – Barry Hawkins
- 140 – Mark King
- 139, 127, 120 – Shaun Murphy
- 138, 132, 128, 126, 104, 103, 102 – John Higgins
- 135 – Bjorn Haneveer
- 134 – Anthony Hamilton
- 129, 115, 111, 107 – Stephen Hendry
- 128, 117, 113, 100 – Ronnie O'Sullivan
- 123 – Mark Williams
- 122 – Neil Robertson
- 118, 116 – Gerard Greene
- 118, 105 – Jimmy White
- 117 – Chris Norbury
- 113, 101, 100 – Stuart Bingham
- 106 – Andy Hicks
- 106 – Fergal O'Brien
- 102 – Stephen Maguire
