= 2006 Masters (snooker) =

Professional non-ranking snooker tournament, Jan 2006

2006 SAGA Insurance Masters

Tournament information
- Dates: 15–22 January 2006
- Venue: Wembley Conference Centre
- City: London
- Country: England
- Organisation: WPBSA
- Format: Non-ranking event
- Winner's share: £125,000
- Highest break: Ronnie O'Sullivan (ENG) (139)

Final
- Champion: John Higgins (SCO)
- Runner-up: Ronnie O'Sullivan (ENG)
- Score: 10–9

The 2006 Masters (officially the 2006 SAGA Insurance Masters) was a professional non-ranking snooker tournament that took place from 15 to 22 January 2006 at the Wembley Conference Centre in London, England. It was the 32nd edition of the tournament, and the last time that the tournament was held at this venue. The tournament was part of the 2005/2006 season.

John Higgins won his 2nd Masters title by defeating defending champion Ronnie O'Sullivan 10–9 in a reverse of last year's final.

== Field ==
Defending champion Ronnie O'Sullivan was the number 1 seed with World Champion Shaun Murphy seeded 2. Places were allocated to the leading players in the world rankings. With Murphy having a ranking of 21, Ian McCulloch, ranked 16, was not an automatic invitation. Players seeded 15 and 16 played in the wild-card round against the winner of the qualifying event, Stuart Bingham (ranked 37), and McCulloch, who was the wild-card selection. Stuart Bingham and Ian McCulloch were making their debuts in the Masters.

== Prize fund ==
The breakdown of prize money for this year is shown below:

=== Qualifying stage ===
- Winner: £2,000
- Runner-up: £680
- Semi-final: £250
- Quarter-final: £105
- Total: £3,600

=== Televised stage ===
- Winner: £125,000
- Runner Up: £60,000
- Semi-final: £30,000
- Quarter-final: £15,000
- Last 16: £10,000
- Last 18 (seeded): £10,000
- Last 18 (wild-cards): £2,000

- Highest break: £10,000
- Maximum break: £25,000

== Wild-card round ==
In the preliminary "wild-card round", the two wild-card players were drawn against the players seeded 15th and 16th:

Match	Date		Score	
WC1	Sunday 15 January	Joe Perry (ENG) (15)	3–6	Ian McCulloch (ENG)
WC2	Sunday 15 January	Steve Davis (ENG) (16)	4–6	Stuart Bingham (ENG)

== Main draw ==
Last 16; Best of 11 frames
1	Ronnie O'Sullivan (ENG)	6
Ian McCulloch (ENG)	0
8	Peter Ebdon (ENG)	6
Stuart Bingham (ENG)	4
5	Matthew Stevens (WAL)	3
14	Graeme Dott (SCO)	6
4	Stephen Maguire (SCO)	0
11	Stephen Lee (ENG)	6
3	Stephen Hendry (SCO)	4
13	Alan McManus (SCO)	6
6	Paul Hunter (ENG)	3
10	Mark Williams (WAL)	6
7	John Higgins (SCO)	6
9	Jimmy White (ENG)	3
2	Shaun Murphy (ENG)	6
12	Ken Doherty (IRL)	5

Quarter-finals; Best of 11 frames
1	(England) Ronnie O'Sullivan	6
8	(England) Peter Ebdon	2
14	(Scotland) Graeme Dott	5
11	(England) Stephen Lee	6
13	(Scotland) Alan McManus	6
10	(Wales) Mark Williams	4
7	(Scotland) John Higgins	6
2	(England) Shaun Murphy	4

Semi-finals; Best of 11 frames
1	(England) Ronnie O'Sullivan	6
11	(England) Stephen Lee	5
13	(Scotland) Alan McManus	2
7	(Scotland) John Higgins	6

Final; Best of 19 frames
1	(England) Ronnie O'Sullivan	9
7	(Scotland) John Higgins	10

== Final ==
Final: Best of 19 frames. Referee: Eirian Williams; Wembley Conference Centre, London, England, 22 January 2006.
Ronnie O'Sullivan (1); England	9–10	John Higgins (7); Scotland
Afternoon: 60–48, 139–0 (139), 138–0 (138), 0–73 (73), 0–80 (80), 20–48, 27–66, 0–71; Evening: 91–44 (91), 100–30 (56), 0–81 (81), 6–86 (68), 72–46, 100–5 (100), 1–71 (62), 62–53, 65–5 (58), 1–83, 60–64 (60, 64)
139	Highest break	80
3	Century breaks	0
7	50+ breaks	6

== Qualifying ==
The 2005 Masters Qualifying Event was held between 20 and 23 November 2005 at Pontin's in Prestatyn, Wales. The winner who qualified for the tournament, was Stuart Bingham.

Last 48; Best of 7 frames
(England) Rory McLeod	4
(England) Joe Jogia	3
(England) James Tatton	1
(England) Simon Bedford	4
(England) Matthew Couch	1
(England) Andrew Norman	4
(Northern Ireland) Patrick Wallace	4
(England) Rod Lawler	2
(Scotland) Marcus Campbell	4
(England) Gary Wilson	0
(Republic of Ireland) Michael Judge	w/o
(England) Adam Davies	w/d
(England) Ricky Walden	3
(England) David Roe	4
(Finland) Robin Hull	4
(Northern Ireland) Mark Allen	1
(England) Justin Astley	w/o
(Scotland) James McBain	w/d
(England) Chris Norbury	2
(England) Alfie Burden	4
(Republic of Ireland) Fergal O'Brien	w/o
(England) Brian Morgan	w/d
(England) Lee Spick	w/o
(England) Sean Storey	w/d
(England) Dave Harold	2
(England) Judd Trump	4
(Northern Ireland) Joe Swail	4
(England) Stuart Mann	0
(England) Jamie Cope	4
(Republic of Ireland) Leo Fernandez	2
(England) Tom Ford	3
(China) Ding Junhui	4

Last 32; Best of 9 frames
(England) Anthony Hamilton	3
(England) Rory McLeod	5
(Malta) Tony Drago	5
(England) Simon Bedford	1
(England) Barry Hawkins	5
(England) Andrew Norman	2
(England) Robert Milkins	w/d
(Northern Ireland) Patrick Wallace	w/o
(England) Nigel Bond	4
(Scotland) Marcus Campbell	5
(Northern Ireland) Gerard Greene	0
(Republic of Ireland) Michael Judge	5
(England) Stuart Bingham	5
(England) David Roe	2
(England) David Gray	2
(Finland) Robin Hull	5
(England) Ali Carter	5
(England) Justin Astley	2
(Wales) Ryan Day	5
(England) Alfie Burden	3
(Australia) Neil Robertson	2
(Republic of Ireland) Fergal O'Brien	5
(Hong Kong) Marco Fu	2
(England) Lee Spick	5
(England) Michael Holt	5
(England) Judd Trump	2
(England) Mark Selby	2
(Northern Ireland) Joe Swail	5
(England) John Parrott	0
(England) Jamie Cope	5
(England) Barry Pinches	2
(China) Ding Junhui	5

Last 16; Best of 9 frames
(England) Rory McLeod	5
(Malta) Tony Drago	3
(England) Barry Hawkins	5
(Northern Ireland) Patrick Wallace	1
(Scotland) Marcus Campbell	5
(Republic of Ireland) Michael Judge	3
(England) Stuart Bingham	5
(Finland) Robin Hull	3
(England) Ali Carter	5
(Wales) Ryan Day	2
(Republic of Ireland) Fergal O'Brien	5
(England) Lee Spick	2
(England) Michael Holt	2
(Northern Ireland) Joe Swail	5
(England) Jamie Cope	1
(China) Ding Junhui	5

Quarter-finals; Best of 9 frames
(England) Rory McLeod	5
(England) Barry Hawkins	3
(Scotland) Marcus Campbell	0
(England) Stuart Bingham	5
(England) Ali Carter	5
(Republic of Ireland) Fergal O'Brien	4
(Northern Ireland) Joe Swail	5
(China) Ding Junhui	4

Semi-finals; Best of 9 frames
(England) Rory McLeod	4
(England) Stuart Bingham	5
(England) Ali Carter	5
(Northern Ireland) Joe Swail	3

Final; Best of 11 frames
(England) Stuart Bingham	6
(England) Ali Carter	3

== Century breaks ==
=== Televised stage centuries ===
Total: 11

- 139, 138, 100 – Ronnie O'Sullivan
- 138, 100 – Peter Ebdon
- 116, 102 – Graeme Dott
- 115, 101 – Shaun Murphy
- 110 – John Higgins
- 101 – Stephen Lee

=== Qualifying stage centuries ===
- 147, 114, 109, 101 – Stuart Bingham
- 140, 106, 100 – Fergal O'Brien
- 132, 120, 116, 116 – Ding Junhui
- 132, 106, 101 – Barry Hawkins
- 130, 100 – Ryan Day
- 127, 105 – Judd Trump
- 127 – Jamie Cope
- 125, 117, 114, 111 – Robin Hull

- 125, 102, 101 – Joe Swail
- 122 – Michael Judge
- 120 – Ricky Walden
- 114 – Patrick Wallace
- 112, 100 – Alfie Burden
- 111 – James Tatton
- 110 – Lee Spick
- 107 – Ali Carter
