= Hugh Abernethy =

Scottish snooker player (born 1967)

Personal information
- Born: 23 December 1967 (age 58)

Sport
- Country: Scotland
- Sport: Snooker
- Professional: 1994–1997, 1998–2003, 2004–2006
- Highest ranking: 80 (2001–2002)
- Best ranking finish: Last 32 (x2)

Hugh Abernethy (born 23 December 1967) is a Scottish former professional snooker player.

== Career ==
=== Early years ===
Born in Scotland in 1967, Abernethy turned professional in 1994. In his first season, he beat Richy McDonald, Steve Lemmens and Karl Broughton en route to the last 128 of the 1994 European Open, but lost at this stage 0–5 to Wayne Brown. He could not progress beyond the fourth qualifying round in any other event, but his performances were sufficient that he ended the season with a ranking of 343.

Moderate success followed in 1994-95, as Abernethy reached the last 64 in the 1995 Benson & Hedges Championship, the qualifying event for the Masters, beating Ashot Potikyan 5–0 before losing 4–5 to Jason Prince, and the fifth qualifying round of the 1996 Welsh Open, where he defeated Ian McCulloch 5–2, but lost 3–5 to John Giles. He reached the same stage in the 1996 World Championship, where he lost 1–5 to Joe Perry.

Starting the 1996-97 season ranked 244, Abernethy immediately improved his personal best performance, again beating McCulloch before losing 1–5 to Fergal O'Brien in the last 96. In the 1997 World Championship, he won three matches - beating Karl Beare 5–2, Jason Pegram 5–4, and Joe Grech 10–5, to reach the last 128, but lost there 1–10 to Nick Dyson. He thus improved his ranking to 167 at the season's conclusion, but this was not enough for him to keep his place on the main tour, and after failing to progress through Qualifying School in 1997, he reverted to amateur status for 1997-98.

=== 1997–1998: UK Tour ===
On the UK Tour, Abernethy found success, recording a quarter-final finish in Event 3 and, in Event 5, beating Dermot McGlinchey, Brian Rowswell, Leigh Robinson, Tony Knowles, Jason Weston and Grech again en route to the final, where he lost 5–6 to Paul Sweeny. Despite this defeat, his performances on the UK Tour earned him an immediate return to the professional tour.

=== 1998–2003: Main tour return ===
The 1998-99 season started poorly in ranking events for Abernethy, his best showing a last-96 appearance in the 1999 Scottish Open, where he lost to Lee Walker, but he continued his good form in non-ranking and pro-am events, reaching another quarter-final at Event 1 of the UK Tour and losing 3–5 to Peter Lines in the semi-finals of the 1998 Merseyside Professional. In the 1999 Thailand Masters, he made a breakthrough, defeating Ali Carter 5–2, Karl Burrows 5–1, Joe Johnson 5–4, Prince 5–3, and most notably Jimmy White 5–3 to qualify for the tournament proper - where, selected to compete in the wildcard round, he followed these performances with a 5–3 victory over Atthasit Mahitthi to reach the last 32 of a ranking tournament for the first time. There, having led Mark Williams 3–2 and made a break of 50 in the eighth frame, he lost that frame 50 points to 55, and the match 3–5.

Starting the 1999-2000 season ranked 132, Abernethy continued where he had left off, beating Dene O'Kane and Prince again to reach the last 64 of the 1999 British Open, but there he lost 4–5 to James Wattana. His best performance of the season came in the same event as in the previous, the 2000 Thailand Masters; this time, he overcame Troy Shaw, Matthew Couch, Jonathan Birch, and Brian Morgan to qualify again for the last 32, but could not progress any further, losing 2–5 to Ken Doherty.

The 2000-2001 season was steady for Abernethy, as he recorded three appearances in the last 64 of a ranking event, at the 2000 British Open, the 2000 Grand Prix, and the 2001 Thailand Masters. As a consequence, he broke into the top 100 of the rankings for the first time, finishing the season ranked 80. He was unable to rise any higher in 2001-2002, dropping to 87, but came within one win of qualifying for the 2002 Masters in reaching the final of the 2001 Benson & Hedges Championship. Having compiled a break of 135 to beat Shaun Murphy 6–4 in the semi-finals, he held Ryan Day to 5–5, but eventually lost 5–9. Further poor results followed in the 2002-03 season, and at its conclusion Abernethy, ranked 119, dropped off the main tour for the second time.

=== 2003–2004: Amateur return ===
Competing on the Challenge Tour for the 2003-2004 season, Abernethy lost in the second round in Event 1 to Steve James, but rediscovered his best form in Event 2, where he overcame Shailesh Jogia and Paul Davison to reach the final, in which he whitewashed Gary Wilson 6–0, and carried this over to Event 4, where he beat Davison again before losing 4–5 to Wilson in the quarter-finals. These results were enough to secure another immediate return to the main tour.

=== 2004–2006: Main tour ===
Abernethy's first season back as a professional was disappointing, as he failed to progress beyond the last 80 in any event except the 2004 Grand Prix, where he lost in the last 64 to Stephen Lee. He began the following season ranked 81, but could not improve upon this performance, only equalling it in beating Sean Storey and Patrick Wallace before losing in the last 64 of the 2006 China Open to Wattana. He lost 3–10 to Jogia in the first qualifying round of the 2006 World Championship, and was relegated for the third and final time from the main tour, aged 38.

After falling off the main tour, he continued playing at amateur level in the Pontins International Open Series, reaching three event quarter-finals in 2007 and one in 2009, and in the 2010-11 season he entered two Players Tour Championship events; after beating Rhys Clark 4–0 to qualify for the first of these, he led Barry Hawkins 2–0 and 3–2 in the last 128, but succumbed 3–4. He withdrew from the next event, and did not compete thereafter.

== Career finals ==
=== Non-ranking finals: 3 (1 title) ===
| Outcome | No. | Year | Championship | Opponent in the final | Score |
|---|---|---|---|---|---|
| Runner-up | 1. | 1998 | UK Tour – Event 5 | (England) Paul Sweeny | 5–6 |
| Runner-up | 2. | 2001 | Benson & Hedges Championship | (Wales) Ryan Day | 5–9 |
| Winner | 1. | 2003 | Challenge Tour - Event 2 | (England) Gary Wilson | 6–0 |
