= James Tatton =

English snooker player

Personal information
- Born: 20 July 1978 (age 48) Bicester, Oxfordshire, England

Sport
- Country: England
- Sport: Snooker
- Professional: 1996/1997, 1998/1999, 2000/2001, 2005/2006
- Highest ranking: 83 (2005/2006)

James Tatton (born 20 July 1978) is an English former professional snooker player.

== Career ==
Born in 1978, Tatton turned professional in 1996. His first season's results meant that he fell off the tour at its conclusion. Several seasons alternating between professional and amateur status, re-qualifying for and again dropping off the tour, followed, before the only tournament win of his career in 2004.

In the 2004/2005 season, Tatton reached the semi-final of Event 1 of that year's Challenge Tour, losing 1–5 to Jamie Cope. In the following event, he defeated Terry Murphy 4–3, Tony Jones also 4–3, Darryn Walker 5–1, Gareth Coppack and Gavin Pantall also 5–1, and the young David Gilbert by the same scoreline, setting up a meeting in the final with Matthew Barnes. Tatton won this match, and the tournament, 6–4, earning him a tour card for the 2005/2006 season.

During the 2005/2006 season, Tatton won only one match - his first qualifying encounter with Gary Wilson, 10–8 in the 2006 World Championship, and lost his seven others. The last of those, a 4–10 last-64 World Championship defeat by Gerard Greene, marked the furthest progress Tatton made in a ranking tournament, and was his final match at competitive level.

== Tournament wins ==
=== Non-ranking Wins (1) ===
- Challenge Tour - Event 2 - 2004

=== Amateur ===
- English Open Southern Area Winner 2003
