= Stuart Mann =

English snooker player

Personal information
- Born: 30 December 1972 (age 53)

Sport
- Country: England
- Sport: Snooker
- Professional: 1991–1997, 1998/1999, 2000/2001, 2003/2004, 2005/2006
- Highest ranking: 90 (2005/2006)

Stuart Mann (born 30 December 1972) is an English former professional snooker player. He competed on the main tour over ten seasons between 1991 and 2006.

== Career ==
Mann was born in 1972, and turned professional in 1991. His first six seasons on the main tour were without any success, and having reached a highest ranking of 220th, he was relegated in 1997.

He returned to the main tour for the 1998/1999 and 2000/2001 seasons, but was relegated once more on each occasion. At the 2001 World Championship, he defeated Peter McCullagh 10–5, Martin Dziewialtowski 10–9 and Matthew Couch 10–2 to reach the last 64 at a ranking event for the first time; requiring two more victories to make his first appearance at the Crucible Theatre, Mann was drawn against Jonathan Birch, but lost 6–10.

During the 2002/2003 season, Mann reached the final of a tournament for the first time, at Event Two of that year's Challenge Tour series. He beat six opponents, including Joe Meara, Scott MacKenzie and Mehmet Husnu, but lost 5–6 in the final to Adrian Rosa.

Competing on the main tour for the 2005/2006 season, Mann defeated Drew Henry 5–4 in the Grand Prix and was drawn against Mark King in the last 64; King defeated him 5–1. He lost 1–10 to Ding Junhui in qualifying for the 2006 World Championship and, ranked 90th, fell off the tour again at the season's conclusion.
