= 1999 Grand Prix (snooker) =

Grand Prix
Tournament information
- Dates: 11–24 October 1999
- Venue: Guild Hall
- City: Preston
- Country: England
- Organisation: WPBSA
- Format: Ranking event
- Total prize fund: £400,000
- Winner's share: £62,000
- Highest break: Ronnie O'Sullivan (ENG) (147)

Final
- Champion: John Higgins (SCO)
- Runner-up: Mark Williams (WAL)
- Score: 9–8

The 1999 Grand Prix was a professional snooker tournament and the second of nine WPBSA ranking events in the 1999/2000 season, following the British Open and preceding the UK Championship. It was held from 11 to 24 October 1999 at the Guild Hall in Preston, England.

Stephen Lee was the defending champion, but he lost his last 32 match against Tony Drago. John Higgins won his 11th ranking title by defeating Mark Williams 9–8 in the final.

== Tournament summary ==
Defending champion Stephen Lee was the number 1 seed with World Champion Stephen Hendry seeded 2. The remaining places were allocated to players based on the world rankings.

== Main draw ==
Last 64; Best of 9 frames
1	(England) Stephen Lee	5
103	(England) Ian Brumby	0
20	(Malta) Tony Drago	5
41	(Northern Ireland) Gerard Greene	1
21	(England) Nigel Bond	5
45	(Scotland) Drew Henry	1
10	(England) Anthony Hamilton	5
98	(Belgium) Mario Geudens	4
13	(England) Peter Ebdon	3
(England) Barry Pinches	5
30	(Northern Ireland) Terry Murphy	5
50	(England) Jason Ferguson	2
17	(England) Dave Harold	5
(England) Mark Selby	4
8	(Scotland) Alan McManus	5
78	(England) Mark Davis	2
7	(Republic of Ireland) Ken Doherty	5
56	(England) Paul Wykes	2
23	(Wales) Darren Morgan	2
52	(England) Dave Finbow	5
28	(Northern Ireland) Joe Swail	5
91	(England) Karl Burrows	3
12	(England) Paul Hunter	5
67	(Republic of Ireland) Michael Judge	4
9	(Wales) Matthew Stevens	5
40	(England) Neal Foulds	0
18	(Scotland) Chris Small	5
44	(England) Steve James	3
29	(England) Gary Wilkinson	5
70	(England) Chris Scanlon	2
4	(Wales) Mark Williams	5
90	(England) Darren Clarke	1
3	(Scotland) John Higgins	5
63	(England) Jimmy Michie	4
19	(Wales) Dominic Dale	5
(Scotland) David McLellan	0
22	(Thailand) James Wattana	5
(Wales) Mark Fenton	3
16	(England) Jimmy White	5
105	(Iceland) Kristján Helgason	4
11	(Republic of Ireland) Fergal O'Brien	5
34	(England) Joe Perry	2
32	(England) Andy Hicks	5
57	(England) Mick Price	2
25	(Scotland) Graeme Dott	5
104	(Wales) Wayne Jones	3
5	(England) Ronnie O'Sullivan	5
75	(England) Willie Thorne	3
6	(England) John Parrott	5
43	(Scotland) Euan Henderson	1
24	(Scotland) Billy Snaddon	1
48	(Scotland) Marcus Campbell	5
26	(Australia) Quinten Hann	w/d
35	(Hong Kong) Marco Fu	w/o
14	(England) Mark King	5
81	(Republic of Ireland) Leo Fernandez	2
15	(England) Steve Davis	2
53	(England) Jonathan Birch	5
31	(England) Brian Morgan	2
142	(England) Ali Carter	5
27	(Scotland) Jamie Burnett	1
(Thailand) Noppadon Noppachorn	5
2	(Scotland) Stephen Hendry	5
49	(England) Gary Ponting	2

Last 32; Best of 9 frames
1	(England) Stephen Lee	4
20	(Malta) Tony Drago	5
21	(England) Nigel Bond	3
10	(England) Anthony Hamilton	5
(England) Barry Pinches	5
30	(Northern Ireland) Terry Murphy	4
17	(England) Dave Harold	5
8	(Scotland) Alan McManus	2
7	(Republic of Ireland) Ken Doherty	5
52	(England) Dave Finbow	1
28	(Northern Ireland) Joe Swail	1
12	(England) Paul Hunter	5
9	(Wales) Matthew Stevens	2
18	(Scotland) Chris Small	5
29	(England) Gary Wilkinson	0
4	(Wales) Mark Williams	5
3	(Scotland) John Higgins	5
19	(Wales) Dominic Dale	0
22	(Thailand) James Wattana	5
16	(England) Jimmy White	3
11	(Republic of Ireland) Fergal O'Brien	2
32	(England) Andy Hicks	5
25	(Scotland) Graeme Dott	1
5	(England) Ronnie O'Sullivan	5
6	(England) John Parrott	4
48	(Scotland) Marcus Campbell	5
35	(Hong Kong) Marco Fu	5
14	(England) Mark King	3
53	(England) Jonathan Birch	2
142	(England) Ali Carter	5
(Thailand) Noppadon Noppachorn	0
2	(Scotland) Stephen Hendry	5

Last 16; Best of 9 frames
20	(Malta) Tony Drago	3
10	(England) Anthony Hamilton	5
(England) Barry Pinches	1
17	(England) Dave Harold	5
7	(Republic of Ireland) Ken Doherty	5
12	(England) Paul Hunter	3
18	(Scotland) Chris Small	1
4	(Wales) Mark Williams	5
3	(Scotland) John Higgins	5
22	(Thailand) James Wattana	3
32	(England) Andy Hicks	4
5	(England) Ronnie O'Sullivan	5
48	(Scotland) Marcus Campbell	2
35	(Hong Kong) Marco Fu	5
142	(England) Ali Carter	5
2	(Scotland) Stephen Hendry	3

Quarter-finals; Best of 9 frames
10	(England) Anthony Hamilton	2
17	(England) Dave Harold	5
7	(Republic of Ireland) Ken Doherty	3
4	(Wales) Mark Williams	5
3	(Scotland) John Higgins	5
5	(England) Ronnie O'Sullivan	3
35	(Hong Kong) Marco Fu	3
142	(England) Ali Carter	5

Semi-finals; Best of 11 frames
17	(England) Dave Harold	5
4	(Wales) Mark Williams	6
3	(Scotland) John Higgins	6
142	(England) Ali Carter	3

Final; Best of 17 frames
4	(Wales) Mark Williams	8
3	(Scotland) John Higgins	9

== Final ==
Final: Best of 17 frames. Referee: Alan Chamberlain. Guild Hall, Preston, England, 24 October 1999.
Mark Williams (4); Wales	8–9	John Higgins (3); Scotland
Afternoon: 1–89 (64), 69–5, 46–77 (55), 83–0 (82), 77–2 (73), 62–30, 53–33, 49–2; Evening: 42–50, 12–68 (68), 0–86 (53), 0–78 (78), 37–59, 88–24 (65), 65–1, 23–107 (66), 0–75
82	Highest break	78
0	Century breaks	0
3	50+ breaks	6

== Qualifying ==
Round of 128 Best of 9 frames

(England) Ian Brumby 5–4 Leigh Griffin (England)

(Thailand) Phaitoon Phonbun 5–3 Richard King (England)

(England) Nick Dyson 5–0 Shokat Ali (Pakistan)

(Belgium) Mario Geudens 5–4 Steve Judd (England)

(England) Barry Pinches 5–1 Tony Knowles (England)

(Scotland) Craig MacGillivray 5–2 Wayne Saidler (England)

(England) Mark Selby 5–2 Stephen O'Connor (Republic of Ireland)

(England) Mark Davis 5–2 Nick Terry (England)

(Finland) Robin Hull 5–1 Tony Jones (England)

(New Zealand) Dene O'Kane 5–2 Eddie Manning (England)

(England) Karl Burrows 5–3 Peter McCullagh (England)

(Republic of Ireland) Michael Judge 5–0 Paul Sweeny (England)

(Belgium) Patrick Delsemme 5–3 Stuart Bingham (England)

(Scotland) John Lardner 5–1 Robert Milkins (England)

(England) Chris Scanlon 5–3 Hugh Abernethy (Scotland)

(England) Darren Clarke 5–1 Mark Bennett (Wales)

(Cyprus) Mehmet Husnu 5–3 Nick Pearce (England)

(Scotland) David McLellan 5–4 Dennis Taylor (Northern Ireland)

(Wales) Mark Fenton 5–2 Michael Holt (England)

(Iceland) Kristján Helgason 5–3 Stefan Mazrocis (England)

(England) Munraj Pal 5–2 Karl Broughton (England)

(England) Craig Harrison 5–1 Patrick Wallace (Northern Ireland)

(Wales) Wayne Jones 5–3 Wayne Brown (England)

(England) Willie Thorne 5–4 James Reynolds (Wales)

(England) Stuart Pettman 5–2 Mike Dunn (England)

(England) Lee Richardson 5–4 Troy Shaw (England)

(Wales) Anthony Davies 5–1 Gareth Chilcott (Wales)

(Republic of Ireland) Leo Fernandez 5–2 Ryan Day (Wales)

(Scotland) Martin Dziewialtowski 5–1 Adrian Gunnell (England)

(England) Ali Carter 5–3 Tony Chappel (Wales)

(Thailand) Noppadon Noppachorn 5–0 Sean Storey (England)

(England) Mark Gray 5–4 Stephen Maguire (Scotland)

Round of 96 Best of 9 frames

(England) Ian Brumby 5–2 Matthew Couch (England)

(Northern Ireland) Gerard Greene 5–2 Phaitoon Phonbun (Thailand)

(Scotland) Drew Henry 5–2 Nick Dyson (England)

(Belgium) Mario Geudens 5–2 Alfie Burden (England)

(England) Barry Pinches 5–1 Paul Davies (Wales)

(England) Jason Ferguson 5–1 Craig MacGillivray (Scotland)

(England) Mark Selby 5–4 Ian McCulloch (England)

(England) Mark Davis 5–3 Dean Reynolds (England)

(England) Paul Wykes 5–2 Robin Hull (Finland)

(England) Dave Finbow 5–4 Dene O'Kane (New Zealand)

(England) Karl Burrows 5–2 Lee Walker (Wales)

(Republic of Ireland) Michael Judge 5–4 Rod Lawler (England)

(England) Neal Foulds 5–2 Patrick Delsemme (Belgium)

(England) Steve James 5–4 John Lardner (Scotland)

(England) Chris Scanlon 5–1 Bradley Jones (England)

(England) Darren Clarke 5–1 Nick Walker (England)

(England) Jimmy Michie 5–2 Mehmet Husnu (Cyprus)

(Scotland) David McLellan 5–4 Joe Johnson (England)

(Wales) Mark Fenton 5–2 Martin Clark (England)

(Iceland) Kristján Helgason 5–2 Jason Prince (Northern Ireland)

(England) Joe Perry 5–1 Munraj Pal (England)

(England) Mick Price 5–2 Craig Harrison (England)

(Wales) Wayne Jones 5–4 David Roe (England)

(England) Willie Thorne 5–2 Peter Lines (England)

(Scotland) Euan Henderson 5–3 Stuart Pettman (England)

(Scotland) Marcus Campbell 5–1 Lee Richardson (England)

(Hong Kong) Marco Fu 5–2 Anthony Davies (Wales)

(Republic of Ireland) Leo Fernandez w/o–w/d Alain Robidoux (Canada)

(England) Jonathan Birch 5–2 Martin Dziewialtowski (Scotland)

(England) Ali Carter 5–2 John Read (England)

(Thailand) Noppadon Noppachorn 5–2 David Gray (England)

(England) Gary Ponting 5–3 Mark Gray (England)
