= 2000 Malta Grand Prix =

Malta Grand Prix
Tournament information
- Dates: 20–27 February 2000
- Venue: Mediterranean Conference Centre
- City: Valletta
- Country: Malta
- Organisation: WPBSA
- Format: Ranking event
- Total prize fund: £290,000
- Winner's share: £50,000
- Highest break: Ronnie O'Sullivan (ENG) (142)

Final
- Champion: Ken Doherty (IRL)
- Runner-up: Mark Williams (WAL)
- Score: 9–3

The 2000 Malta Grand Prix was the sixth edition of the professional ranking snooker tournament which took place at the Mediterranean Conference Centre in Valletta, Malta. Qualifying for the event started on 3 January 2000 and the final stages took place between 20 and 27 February 2000.

Ken Doherty won the tournament, defeating Mark Williams 9–3 in the final. The highest break, a 142, was compiled by quarter-finalist Ronnie O'Sullivan in his last-16 match against Jimmy White.

== Prize fund ==
The breakdown of prize money for this year is shown below:

- Winner £50,000
- Runner-up £26,000
- Highest break £3,000
- Total £290,000

== Wildcard round ==
Match		Score	
WC1	Adrian Gunnell (ENG)	5–1	Alex Borg (MLT)
WC2	Nick Dyson (ENG)	4–5	Joe Grech (MLT)

== Main draw ==
Last 32; Best of 9 frames
(England) Alfie Burden	5
(England) Mark King	4
(Republic of Ireland) Ken Doherty	5
(England) Gary Wilkinson	1
(Republic of Ireland) Stephen O'Connor	4
(England) Jimmy White	5
(England) Ronnie O'Sullivan	5
(England) Rod Lawler	4
(England) Adrian Gunnell	0
(Scotland) Stephen Hendry	5
(Wales) Matthew Stevens	5
(England) Michael Holt	3
(England) Paul Hunter	3
(England) Nigel Bond	5
(England) Stephen Lee	5
(England) David Gray	4
(Hong Kong) Marco Fu	5
(England) Peter Ebdon	3
(Scotland) Alan McManus	5
(Wales) Dominic Dale	2
(Republic of Ireland) Fergal O'Brien	5
(Scotland) Drew Henry	4
(Scotland) John Higgins	5
(Northern Ireland) Joe Swail	2
(Scotland) Billy Snaddon	3
(England) John Parrott	5
(England) Robert Milkins	5
(England) Anthony Hamilton	4
(England) Steve Davis	5
(England) Stuart Pettman	0
(Wales) Mark Williams	5
(Malta) Joe Grech	2

Last 16; Best of 9 frames
(England) Alfie Burden	2
(Republic of Ireland) Ken Doherty	5
(England) Jimmy White	1
(England) Ronnie O'Sullivan	5
(Scotland) Stephen Hendry	5
(Wales) Matthew Stevens	3
(England) Nigel Bond	4
(England) Stephen Lee	5
(Hong Kong) Marco Fu	5
(Scotland) Alan McManus	4
(Republic of Ireland) Fergal O'Brien	3
(Scotland) John Higgins	5
(England) John Parrott	5
(England) Robert Milkins	4
(England) Steve Davis	2
(Wales) Mark Williams	5

Quarter-finals; Best of 9 frames
(Republic of Ireland) Ken Doherty	5
(England) Ronnie O'Sullivan	2
(Scotland) Stephen Hendry	2
(England) Stephen Lee	5
(Hong Kong) Marco Fu	5
(Scotland) John Higgins	3
(England) John Parrott	1
(Wales) Mark Williams	5

Semi-finals; Best of 11 frames
(Republic of Ireland) Ken Doherty	6
(England) Stephen Lee	4
(Hong Kong) Marco Fu	3
(Wales) Mark Williams	6

Final; Best of 17 frames
(Republic of Ireland) Ken Doherty	9
(Wales) Mark Williams	3

== Qualifying ==
The three qualifying rounds took place between 3 and 14 January 2000, and were all played under a best-of-nine frames format.

=== Round 1 ===
- (Pakistan) Shokat Ali 5–2 (England) Ali Carter
- (Wales) Mark Bennett 5–2 (England) Craig Harrison
- (England) Stuart Bingham 5–3 (England) Lee Richardson
- (England) Karl Broughton 5–4 (England) Wayne Saidler
- (Wales) Tony Chappel 5–3 (England) Nick Terry
- (Wales) Gareth Chilcott 5–3 (England) Steve Judd
- (England) Darren Clarke 5–4 (England) Mark Davis
- (Wales) Anthony Davies 5–4 (Scotland) Hugh Abernethy
- (England) Mike Dunn 5–0 (England) Mark Gray
- (England) Nick Dyson 5–2 (Scotland) Craig MacGillivray
- (Scotland) Martin Dziewialtowski 5–2 (Wales) Mark Fenton
- (Republic of Ireland) Leo Fernandez 5–0 (Scotland) Stephen Maguire
- (England) Leigh Griffin 5–4 (England) Munraj Pal
- (England) Adrian Gunnell 5–3 (England) Tony Knowles
- (Iceland) Kristján Helgason 5–1 (England) Stefan Mazrocis
- (England) Michael Holt 5–0 (Belgium) Patrick Delsemme
- (Finland) Robin Hull 5–2 (Northern Ireland) Dennis Taylor
- (Republic of Ireland) Michael Judge 5–0 (Scotland) David McLellan
- (England) Robert Milkins 5–3 (England) Nick Pearce
- (Thailand) Noppadon Noppachorn 5–3 (England) Wayne Brown
- (Republic of Ireland) Stephen O'Connor 5–2 (England) Peter McCullagh
- (New Zealand) Dene O'Kane 5–2 (Wales) Richard King
- (England) Stuart Pettman 5–2 (Cyprus) Mehmet Husnu
- (Thailand) Phaitoon Phonbun 5–4 (England) Eddie Manning
- (England) Barry Pinches 5–0 (Scotland) John Lardner
- (Wales) James Reynolds 5–2 (England) Karl Burrows
- (England) Chris Scanlon 5–3 (Wales) Ryan Day
- (England) Mark Selby 5–2 (England) Tony Jones
- (England) Troy Shaw 5–3 (Belgium) Mario Geudens
- (England) Paul Sweeny 5–2 (England) Sean Storey
- (England) Willie Thorne 5–4 (England) Ian Brumby
- (Northern Ireland) Patrick Wallace 5–2 (Wales) Wayne Jones

=== Round 2 ===
- (England) Karl Broughton 5–2 (England) Jason Ferguson
- (England) Alfie Burden 5–2 (England) Chris Scanlon
- (Scotland) Marcus Campbell 5–4 (England) Darren Clarke
- (England) Martin Clark 5–3 (Thailand) Phaitoon Phonbun
- (England) Matthew Couch 5–2 (New Zealand) Dene O'Kane
- (Wales) Paul Davies 5–3 (Iceland) Kristján Helgason
- (England) Nick Dyson 5–3 (England) Neal Foulds
- (Scotland) Martin Dziewialtowski 5–3 (England) Joe Perry
- (Republic of Ireland) Leo Fernandez 5–3 (England) Gary Ponting
- (Hong Kong) Marco Fu 5–2 (Wales) Mark Bennett
- (England) David Gray 5–2 (England) Mike Dunn
- (England) Leigh Griffin w/o–w/d (Canada) Alain Robidoux
- (England) Adrian Gunnell 5–3 (Northern Ireland) Gerard Greene
- (Scotland) Euan Henderson 5–4 (Wales) Tony Chappel
- (Scotland) Drew Henry 5–2 (England) Willie Thorne
- (England) Michael Holt 5–3 (England) Dave Finbow
- (Finland) Robin Hull 5–1 (England) Jonathan Birch
- (England) Joe Johnson 5–0 (Wales) Gareth Chilcott
- (England) Bradley Jones 5–4 (Wales) Anthony Davies
- (England) Rod Lawler 5–3 (Wales) James Reynolds
- (England) Peter Lines 5–4 (England) Paul Sweeny
- (England) Ian McCulloch 5–0 (Pakistan) Shokat Ali
- (England) Robert Milkins 5–2 (England) David Roe
- (England) Stuart Pettman 5–2 (England) Steve James
- (Republic of Ireland) Stephen O'Connor 5–2 (England) Nick Walker
- (England) Barry Pinches 5–2 (England) Dean Reynolds
- (Northern Ireland) Jason Prince 5–4 (England) Stuart Bingham
- (England) John Read 5–2 (Northern Ireland) Patrick Wallace
- (England) Mark Selby 5–3 (England) Jimmy Michie
- (England) Troy Shaw 5–3 (England) Mick Price
- (Wales) Lee Walker 5–3 (Republic of Ireland) Michael Judge
- (England) Paul Wykes 5–1 (Thailand) Noppadon Noppachorn

=== Round 3 ===
- (England) Alfie Burden 5–3 (England) Karl Broughton
- (Scotland) Marcus Campbell 5–2 (Scotland) Euan Henderson
- (England) Matthew Couch 5–2 (England) Peter Lines
- (England) Nick Dyson 5–3 (England) John Read
- (Republic of Ireland) Leo Fernandez 5–2 (England) Paul Wykes
- (Hong Kong) Marco Fu 5–1 (England) Bradley Jones
- (England) David Gray 5–0 (Wales) Paul Davies
- (England) Adrian Gunnell 5–0 (England) Barry Pinches
- (Scotland) Drew Henry 5–1 (England) Martin Clark
- (England) Michael Holt w/o–w/d (England) Joe Johnson
- (England) Rod Lawler 5–3 (Finland) Robin Hull
- (England) Robert Milkins 5–3 (England) Leigh Griffin
- (Republic of Ireland) Stephen O'Connor 5–2 (Scotland) Martin Dziewialtowski
- (England) Stuart Pettman 5–3 (England) Ian McCulloch
- (Northern Ireland) Jason Prince 5–1 (Wales) Lee Walker
- (England) Troy Shaw 5–2 (England) Mark Selby

=== Round 4 ===
- (England) Nigel Bond 5–0 (Northern Ireland) Jason Prince
- (England) Alfie Burden 5–1 (England) Brian Morgan
- (Wales) Dominic Dale 5–2 (England) Matthew Couch
- (England) Nick Dyson 5–4 (England) Dave Harold
- (Hong Kong) Marco Fu 5–2 (Scotland) Chris Small
- (England) David Gray 5–1 (Malta) Tony Drago
- (England) Adrian Gunnell 5–1 (Scotland) Jamie Burnett
- (England) Michael Holt 5–2 (England) Andy Hicks
- (England) Rod Lawler 5–0 (Thailand) James Wattana
- (England) Robert Milkins 5–3 (Northern Ireland) Terry Murphy
- (Scotland) Billy Snaddon 5–1 (Scotland) Marcus Campbell
- (Republic of Ireland) Stephen O'Connor 5–2 (Wales) Darren Morgan
- (England) Stuart Pettman 5–0 (Scotland) Graeme Dott
- (Northern Ireland) Joe Swail 5–3 (England) Troy Shaw
- (England) Gary Wilkinson 5–2 (Republic of Ireland) Leo Fernandez
- (Scotland) Drew Henry w/o–w/d (Australia) Quinten Hann

== Century breaks ==
- 142, 123 – Ronnie O'Sullivan
- 138, 113 – David Gray
- 135, 123 – Peter Ebdon
- 135, 117, 104 – Michael Holt
- 131, 122 – Darren Morgan
- 129, 120 – Matthew Stevens
- 129 – Stephen O'Connor
- 129 – Kristján Helgason
- 128, 107, 100 – Stephen Hendry
- 127, 108, 101 – Marco Fu
- 126 – Joe Swail
- 126 – Rod Lawler
- 123, 119, 104 – Mark Williams
- 123, 112, 105, 105, 101 – Ken Doherty
- 122 – Karl Broughton
- 122 – Nigel Bond
- 121 – Robert Milkins
- 119, 119 – Alfie Burden
- 117 – James Reynolds
- 114 – Steve Davis
- 112 – John Parrott
- 112, 108, 107 – Nick Dyson
- 111 – Shokat Ali
- 105 – Darren Clarke
- 104 – Stephen Lee
- 103 – Troy Shaw
- 103 – Eddie Manning
- 102 – John Higgins
- 100 – Joe Johnson
- 100 – Robin Hull
