= 1996 World Snooker Championship =

Professional snooker tournament

1996 Embassy World Snooker Championship
Tournament information
- Dates: 20 April – 6 May 1996
- Venue: Crucible Theatre
- City: Sheffield
- Country: England
- Organisation: WPBSA
- Format: Ranking event
- Total prize fund: £1,200,000
- Winner's share: £200,000
- Highest break: Peter Ebdon (ENG) (144); Tony Drago (MLT) (144)

Final
- Champion: Stephen Hendry (SCO)
- Runner-up: Peter Ebdon (ENG)
- Score: 18–12

The 1996 World Snooker Championship (also referred to as the 1996 Embassy World Snooker Championship for the purposes of sponsorship) was a professional snooker tournament that took place between 20 April and 6 May 1996 at the Crucible Theatre in Sheffield, England, the 20th consecutive year that the World Snooker Championship was staged at the venue. Sponsored by cigarette brand Embassy, the tournament was the tenth and final ranking event of the 1995–96 season. The winner received £200,000 from a total prize fund of £1,200,000.

The top 16 players from the snooker world rankings were seeded through to the main stage at the Crucible. They were joined by the 16 successful players from ten qualifying rounds. There were five Crucible debutants at the tournament: Jimmy Michie, Jamie Burnett, Nick Terry, Euan Henderson and Anthony Hamilton.

Stephen Hendry was the defending champion, having defeated Nigel Bond 18–9 in the 1995 final to win his fifth world title. He retained the title by beating Peter Ebdon 18–12. It was Hendry's fifth consecutive title and his sixth in total, equalling Ray Reardon's and Steve Davis's record in the modern era. The main stage of the tournament produced 48 century breaks, of which the highest were breaks of 144 by Ebdon and Tony Drago.

== Background ==
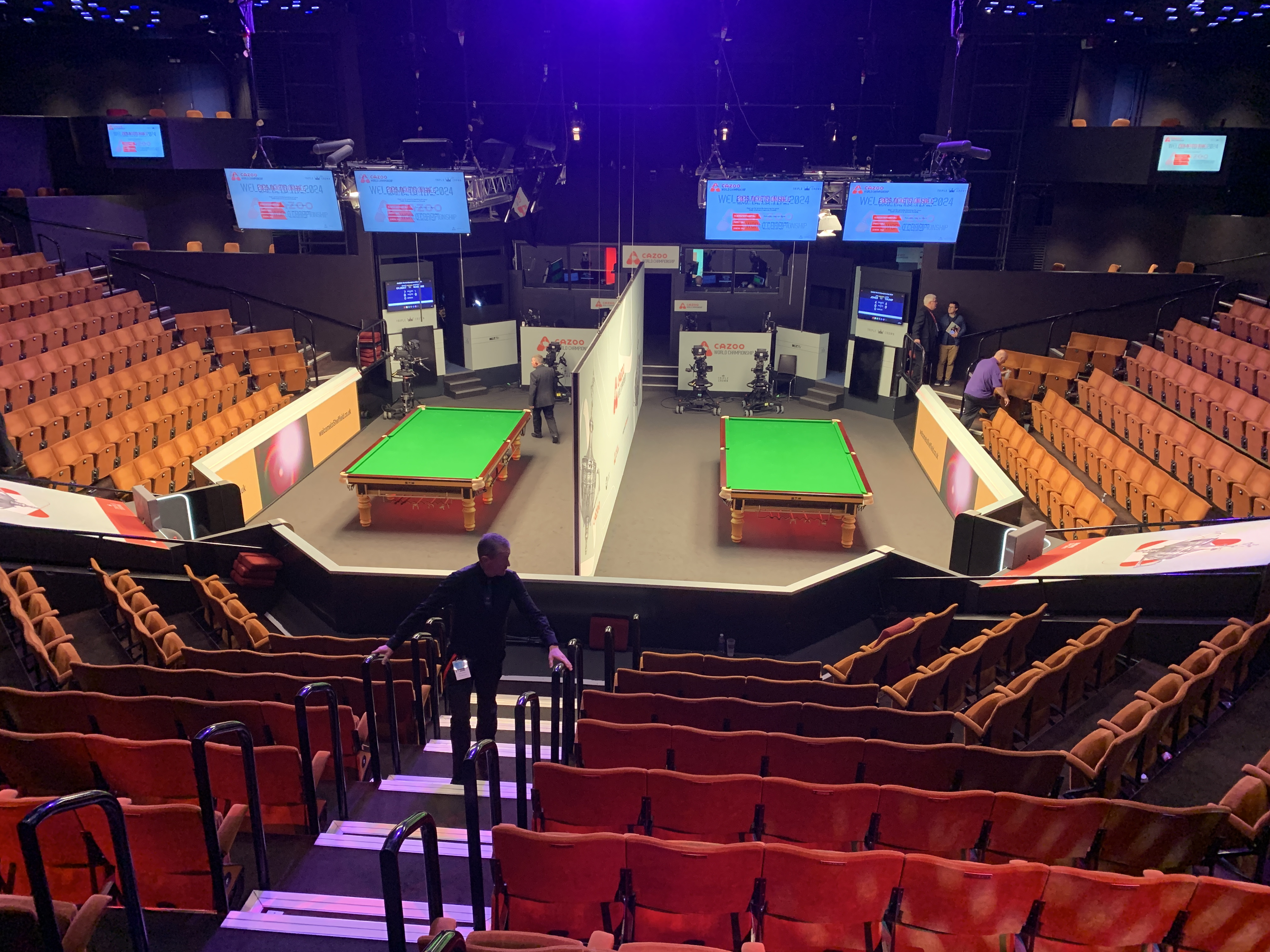
Setup of the arena at the Crucible Theatre, shown during the 2024 World Snooker Championship

The inaugural 1927 World Snooker Championship, then known as the Professional Championship of Snooker, took place at various venues in England between November 1926 and May 1927. Joe Davis won the final—held at Camkin's Hall in Birmingham from 9 to 12 May 1927—and went on to win the tournament 15 consecutive times before retiring undefeated after the 1946 edition (no tournaments were held from 1941 to 1945 because of World War II). The tournament went into abeyance after only two players contested the 1952 edition. The six editions of the World Professional Match-play Championship held between 1952 and 1957 are retroactively regarded as legitimate continuations of the World Snooker Championship, but that tournament was discontinued due to waning public interest in snooker in the post-war era. The world title was uncontested between 1958 and 1963.

Rex Williams was instrumental in reviving the World Snooker Championship on a challenge basis in 1964. John Pulman, winner of the 1957 World Professional Match-play Championship, defended the world title across seven challenge matches between 1964 and 1968. The World Snooker Championship reverted to an annual knockout tournament for the 1969 edition, marking the beginning of the championship's "modern era". The 1977 edition was the first staged at the Crucible Theatre in Sheffield, where it has remained since. As of 1996, the most successful players in the modern era were Ray Reardon and Steve Davis, each having won the title six times. Stephen Hendry was the tournament's youngest winner, having captured his first title at the 1990 event, aged 21 years and 106 days. Reardon was the oldest winner, having secured his sixth title at the 1978 event, aged 45 years and 203 days.

== Overview ==
The 1996 edition of the tournament—the 28th successive year that the World Snooker Championship was contested through the modern knockout format—took place from 20 April to 6 May at the Crucible Theatre in Sheffield, England, the 20th consecutive year that the World Championship was staged at the venue. Sponsored by cigarette brand Embassy, it was the tenth and last ranking tournament of the 1995–96 season, held after the British Open. The defending champion was Stephen Hendry, who had defeated Nigel Bond 18–9 in the final of the 1995 World Championship to win the title.

=== Format ===
The top 16 players in the snooker world rankings were seeded through to the main stage at the Crucible Theatre. They faced 16 players who progressed through the qualifying rounds. First-round matches were played as the best of 19 frames, held over two sessions. Second-round and quarter-final matches were played as the best of 25 frames, held over three sessions. The semi-final matches were played as the best of 31 frames, held over four sessions. The final was the best of 35 frames, also held over four sessions.

=== Prize fund ===
The winner of the event received £200,000 from a total prize fund of £1,200,000. The breakdown of prize money for this year is shown below:

- Winner: £200,000
- Runner-up: £120,000
- Semi-final: £60,000
- Quarter-final: £30,000
- Last 16: £16,000
- Last 32: £9,000
- 10th qualifying round losers: £7,800
- 9th qualifying round losers: £4,800
- 8th qualifying round losers: £2,700
- 7th qualifying round losers: £1,800
- Highest break of the main event: £17,000
- Highest break of the qualifying event: £5,400
- Maximum break: £147,000
- Total: £1,200,000

== Summary ==
=== Qualifying ===
There were ten rounds in the qualifying competition. The first nine rounds were held at the Norbreck Hotel, Blackpool, between 1 and 25 January 1996. The final round was at the Telford International Centre on 21 and 22 March. Rounds one to five were the best of 9 frames and the later rounds were the best of 19. Paul Hunter, described by Snooker Scene magazine as "the season's outstanding rookie", won the deciding frame against Dean Venables in round 4; he won his other three matches for the loss of only two frames to reach round six. Against expectations, the world number 184 Richy McDonald defeated Matthew Stevens, ranked 48th, 5–4 in the fifth round. Reigning Women's World Champion Karen Corr defeated Mario Wehrmann 5–0 in the third round but then lost 3–5 to Wayne Lloyd. The highest break of the first five rounds was 136, by Jason Greaves in his fourth round win against Daniele Zagaroli.

In the sixth round, Nick Dyson compiled a 137 break during his 10–1 defeat of Andrew Atkinson. Hunter lost 4–10 to Nick Walker in round seven, and Karl Burrows beat Robert Milkins 10–7, leaving Chris Shade, who defeated Stuart Pettman 10–6, as the only first-year professional to reach the eighth round. Two players who had featured in the main stage regularly in the 1980s, Tony Meo and David Taylor, were beaten by Stephen O'Connor and Surinder Gill respectively.

In the eighth round, Dominic Dale made a break of 141 and defeated the 1986 champion Joe Johnson 10–7. The 1980 winner, Cliff Thorburn, went out 3–10 to Paul Davies, and 1981 runner-up Doug Mountjoy lost 4–10 to Gerard Greene. Thorburn said that playing in the qualifying was demoralising: "Four days before I left home I played an exhibition in front of 1,000 people. Then I get here, there's one or two people in the audience, and mentally it's so tough to deal with." The 1972 and 1982 champion Alex Higgins lost 7–10 to Gill in what Snooker Scene magazine described as "an acrimonious and undignified end to by far the worst season of his 25 year professional career". After the match, Higgins said that he had lodged 17 complaints against the WPBSA and would be taking them to court unless they gave him a satisfactory response. The match between John Read and Mark King was decided on the final black ball in the deciding frame; Read potted the black but then went in-off, meaning that King won. Shade led Jonathan Birch 9–5, but Birch levelled at 9–9, helped by a break of 141 in frame 17, and won the deciding frame by 57 points. Mark Williams recovered from 3–6 to 6–6 and from 6–8 to 8–8 but eventually lost 8–10 to Jamie Burnett. Ian McCulloch, ranked 193rd, was the lowest-ranked player to win in round nine, defeating Fergal O'Brien 10–6. Greene won six successive frames from 4–9 behind to beat Dale.

Ten of the sixteen players seeded into the final qualifying round won their matches. Andy Hicks, a semi-finalist in the previous edition, lost 6–10 to Jimmy Michie. The 1985 champion Dennis Taylor was beaten 5–10 by Rod Lawler, but made a break of 140, his highest in 20 years of competing in the World Championship. Taylor had appeared at the main event every year from 1977 to 1994. Willie Thorne, who had played in the main event every year except one since 1978, qualified again by beating Danny Fowler 10–4. Neal Foulds defeated Chris Small 10–9 in a contest that lasted 8 hours and 56 minutes. Tony Knowles recovered from 3–8 to 8–9 against Drew Henry, but Henry clinched the match by winning frame 18.

Dale and Birch shared the £5,400 prize for the highest break in qualifying, each having made a break of 141. There were five players who qualified for the main event for the first time: Michie, Burnett, Nick Terry, Euan Henderson, and Anthony Hamilton. Burnett beat Brian Morgan 10–7 and Terry defeated Dean Reynolds by the same margin. Hamilton was a 10–3 winner over Walker and Henderson won 10–9 against Joe Swail.

=== First round ===
The first round took place from 20 to 25 April, each match played as the best of 19 frames over two sessions. The defending champion, Stephen Hendry, made two century breaks and a break of 91 in the first session, but Jason Ferguson took a 6–3 lead with breaks of 60 and 129. Hendry won the first four frames of the second session to go in front, but the match was tied at 8–8. A break of 104 allowed Hendry to seal a 10–8 victory. "If I had lost today it would have been a disaster for me. Jason [Ferguson] punished every mistake. I don't normally feel vulnerable at this venue, but I was today," Hendry said.

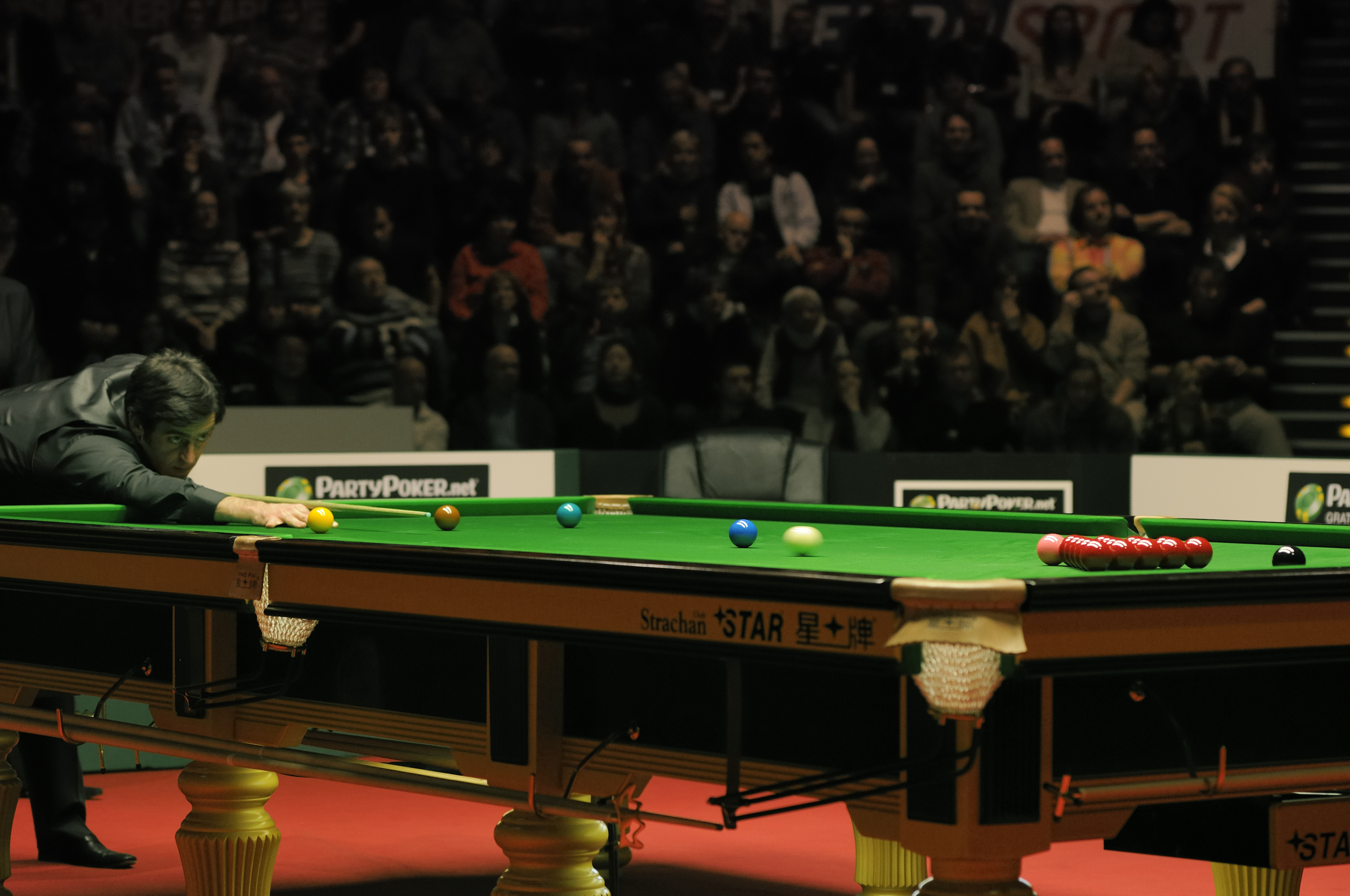
Ronnie O'Sullivan (pictured in 2012) played some left-handed shots in his first-round match against Alain Robidoux. His rival called this "disrespectful".

Ronnie O'Sullivan eliminated Alain Robidoux 10–3, making two century breaks and a further four half-centuries. O'Sullivan played some of the shots in frame 11 with his left hand, which Robidoux regarded as "disrespectful". He refused to shake hands at the end of the match. "It is bad and I don't like it. It might be good for the crowd but I was struggling with my game and he was only rubbing it in. Ronnie [O'Sullivan] is a great player with a great talent who doesn't need to do this. He should keep the left-handed stuff for the exhibition circus," Robidoux said. "Whether playing left-handed does any harm, I don't know but I will do it again if the chance to do so comes along. People want to be entertained and I can make 90 breaks in this way. I'm better left-handed than he is right-handed," O'Sullivan replied. The tournament director submitted a report to the World Professional Billiards and Snooker Association, the governing body of the sport.

Dene O'Kane won the opening frame with a half-century, but Peter Ebdon compiled breaks including 144, 138, and 92 as he won ten consecutive frames for a 10–1 victory. Tony Drago compiled breaks of 60, 72, and 115 as he defeated Steve James 10–2. Dave Harold produced breaks of 123, 101, and 120 to eliminate Neal Foulds 10–4. "That's the best I've played," Harold said. The six-time World Champion Steve Davis made a 103 break in the first session of his match against Willie Thorne, which ended 4–4. Thorne then led 8–5, but Davis won five frames in a row to secure victory.

John Parrott, the 1991 World Champion, lost in the first round for the first time since his debut in 1984. Trailing Rod Lawler 3–6 at the conclusion of the first session, Parrott made breaks of 99, 60, and 87 to level the match. Lawler took the next four frames for victory. "I suppose I had to lose in this round sometime but it's a disappointing way to end what has been a good season for me," Parrott said. Gary Wilkinson won the opening frame against David Roe, but he fell 3–6 behind at the end of the first session. The first four frames of the second session were shared, and Wilkinson then won four in a row to go 9–8 ahead. Roe forced a decider with a 74 break, but Wilkinson progressed with a 60 contribution. "[Roe] is scary in practice but never seems to show his true potential at the match table ... he probably deserved [a 6–3 lead] because he went for more balls than I did," Wilkinson said.

Hamilton recovered from 0–5 behind to level the match against Nigel Bond. Hamilton then took the lead with a highest break of 115. Bond had a chance to secure victory in frame 18, but he missed a black ball and Hamilton forced a deciding frame. Hamilton was in first in the decider, but he missed a blue and Bond won the match. "It was difficult playing Anthony [Hamilton] because we know each other's game so well having practised together quite a lot, though not so much these days because of the possibility of meeting in tournaments," Bond said. He secured a place in the English team for the 1996 World Cup, held in Thailand. The ninth seed Ken Doherty trailed qualifier Terry 3–5 at the end of the first session, but he then won all seven frames played in the second to progress to the second round with a 10–5 result. "People might not recognise some of the qualifiers here but there are no Joe Soaps about, they just haven't made the breakthrough. We know them and they're all good players," Doherty said.

Alan McManus, a two-time semi-finalist, trailed Mick Price 3–5 at the conclusion of the first day of the match. McManus won all seven frames of the second session, featuring breaks of 55, 125, and 64, to claim victory with a 10–5 result. "Experience came into it afterwards because I knew how to handle the situation. It also made my job easier when I noticed Mick [Price]'s head starting to go down. I would have been gutted had I lost," McManus said regarding the second round of the tournament. Burnett, making his debut at the Crucible, built a 6–0 lead against Terry Griffiths, producing two half-centuries. Griffiths took the seventh frame with a 70 break and also secured the last of the session to reduce the deficit to four frames. The first six frames of the second session were shared. Griffiths then took four frames in a row to force a decider, which he won by potting the last black ball. The match lasted almost 8 hours. "I don't deserve to be in the top 16 and, anyway, I will have to qualify to come back here next year," Griffiths said.

John Higgins was deemed the "second favourite" by John Dee, writing for The Daily Telegraph. He produced breaks of 87, 55, and 63 to lead Martin Clark 6–3 after the first session. Five half-century breaks and a 101 helped Higgins to take four of the six frames played in the second session and clinch a 10–5 victory. Darren Morgan, the 1996 Irish Masters winner, fell 1–3 behind Henry. Morgan compiled two half-centuries to win three of the last five frames of the session to reduce the deficit to one frame. Henry led 7–5, but Morgan tied the match at 7–7. Henry won the next frame, but Morgan took the last three to secure a 10–8 victory. Henderson compiled breaks of 59 and 103 as he took a 5–4 lead against the six-time runner-up Jimmy White at the end of the first session. White led 9–6, but breaks of 66, 50, and 58 by Henderson took the match to a decider. White laid a snooker and then produced a 56-point clearance to win the match. "My game has been a nightmare and I am just delighted to have got through this match. Hopefully now I can enjoy the rest of the tournament," said White, who dedicated victory to his wife.

Facing Jimmy Michie, James Wattana needed to win his first-round match to secure a top-16 place for the next season. Michie won the first two frames of the first session and also the last two to lead 5–4. Wattana began the second session with four consecutive frames. Michie took frames 16 and 17 to reduce his arrears to 8–9, but Wattana secured a 10–8 victory. "I'm through and, most important of all, I'm still in the top 16. I didn't play all that well but Jimmy [Michie] is such an unpredictable player ... The crowd love the way he plays and at times it did break my concentration," Wattana said.

=== Second round ===
The second round took place from 25 to 29 April, each match played as the best of 25 frames over three sessions. Drago compiled a highest break of 144, but O'Sullivan produced breaks of 57, 62, 100, and 120 to lead 6–2 at the end of the first session. O'Sullivan won six of the eight frames of the second session and also took the first of the third session to advance with a 13–4 victory. "I'm buzzing and that's the best I've ever played. I couldn't be more confident about my chances. It's a big stage I'm playing on and I feel I'm up for the job. No one frightens me," O'Sullivan said. The match lasted 167 minutes and 33 seconds, setting a record for the fastest best-of-25-frame match. O'Sullivan was then found guilty of assaulting an official and received a two-year suspended ban and a £20,000 fine, plus another £10,000 to be donated to charity.

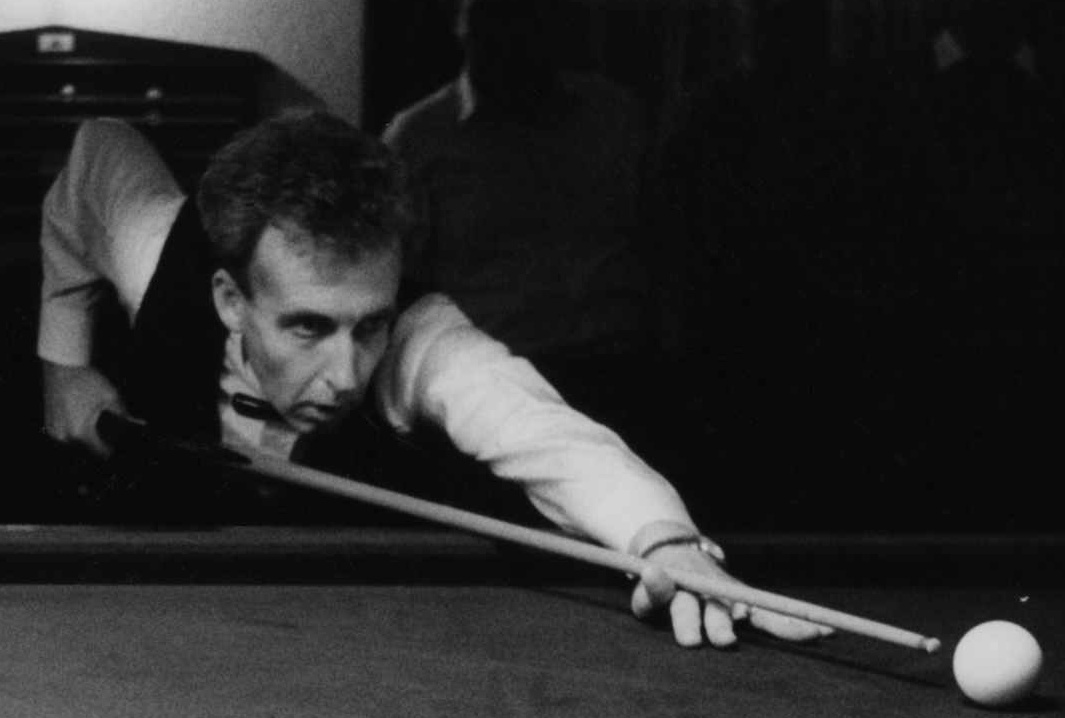
Terry Griffiths (pictured in 1991) lost 8–13 to Steve Davis in the second round, his seventh loss to him in seven matches at the Crucible Theatre. He lost his place in the top 16 of the snooker world rankings after seventeen consecutive seasons.

In the opening frame, Griffiths required a snooker with only the blue, pink, and black remaining, but Davis went in-off and Griffiths produced a clearance to steal it. Davis produced a 105 break to take the second frame, and the remaining frames of the first session were shared. Griffiths led 8–7 going into the last session, in which Davis compiled breaks of 64, 52, 51, and 72 to win all six frames for a 13–8 victory. It was Griffiths's seventh loss in seven matches against Davis at the Crucible. Griffiths fell out of the top 16 after seventeen consecutive seasons. Hendry built a 4–0 lead with breaks of 85, 68, and 135. Wilkinson, trailing 3–5 at the end of the first session, tied the match in the second session at 6–6. Hendry made two breaks of 76 as he took four consecutive frames. In the third session, Hendry made a century break and sealed victory with a 13–7 scoreline. From 4–4, Harold won seven consecutive frames against Lawler. Harold added two more frames in the third session to win 13–6 and reach the quarter-finals of the World Championship for the first time in his career.

White trailed Ebdon 3–5, but he won five consecutive frames in the second session, featuring a century break, as he took a 9–7 lead. Ebdon made a century in the first frame of the final session and also took three consecutive frames to lead 11–10. Breaks of 90 and 55 allowed White to force a decider, which Ebdon won with a 123 break. "This is the most memorable game I have ever been involved in. There are so many mixed emotions playing Jimmy [White]. The reason why I started playing this game was because of Jimmy and Steve Davis and for me to beat him here when he is back in form is unbelievable," Ebdon said. Higgins faced McManus, who had defeated him in the first round of the previous edition. Higgins produced breaks of 80, 62, 84, 54, and 73 to build a 6–2 lead after the first session. He also won six of the eight frames of the second session, with a 130 break in the last to go 12–4, one away from victory. He sealed victory in the second frame of the third session with a 77-point visit. "I've run into form at the right time and I fancy my chances very strongly of winning the title," Higgins said.

The first session between Wattana and Bond was shared. Bond produced breaks of 71, 64, 57, and 99 as he took all eight frames played in the second session and also won the first of the third with a 53 break, for a 13–4 victory. "It was amazing to lose all those frames. I didn't think either of us played particularly well and in four or five close frames Nigel [Bond] nicked them all. But I'm not complaining. My form wasn't good enough and I didn't deserve to win," Wattana said. Morgan constructed a 110 break as he took a 5–3 lead against Doherty. Morgan compiled three half-centuries to secure the first three frames of the second session. Doherty forfeited the next frame on the three-miss rule, the first time this happened at the World Championship. Morgan won three more frames, making it eight in a row. Doherty produced a 109 break and also won the first frame of the third session, but Morgan clinched a 13–5 victory with a 79 break.

=== Quarter-finals ===
The quarter-finals took place on 30 April and 1 May, each match played as the best of 25 frames over three sessions. Facing Harold, Bond took the first three frames and led 5–3 at the end of the first session. He also won the first four frames of the second session for a 9–3 lead, before Harold won three of the last four, making breaks of 96, 68, and 88. Harold took frame 17 with a 75 break, but Bond won three frames in succession for a 13–7 victory.

Higgins took the opening frame, but O'Sullivan replied by winning the second on the black. O'Sullivan made two half-centuries to win frames three and four, but Higgins secured the remaining four, making a 137 break in frame six. O'Sullivan produced a century break in the first frame of the second session, but Higgins made breaks of 94, 104, and 70 as he extended his lead at 10–6. O'Sullivan made a 106 break as he took the first four frames of the final session and levelled the match. Higgins then won two frames to get within one of victory at 12–10. O'Sullivan halved the deficit in the next and then tied the match after Higgins missed the final pink ball. O'Sullivan won the decider for victory.

Hendry trailed Morgan 1–3, but he compiled breaks of 55, 82, 92, and 63 to win four consecutive frames and lead at the conclusion of the first session. Morgan took the first frame of the second session, but Hendry followed with breaks including 55, 110, 108, and 71 as he won the remaining seven in succession. Morgan won the first frame of the third session with a highest break of 96, but Hendry took the next for a 13–5 victory. "I haven't been at my best so far but I'm still here. I must have a good chance of winning," Hendry said. Ebdon led Davis 2–1. In the fourth frame, Ebdon miscued and damaged the cloth, which had to be replaced at the end of the session. Ebdon made a 137 break as he took three consecutive frames for a 5–1 lead at the end of the session. In the second session, Davis compiled breaks of 104, 73, 75, 116, and 54 as he took six of the eight frames to level the match at 7–7. Davis led 8–7, 9–8 and 10–9, but Ebdon won the last four frames in succession to claim victory with a 13–10 result.

=== Semi-finals ===
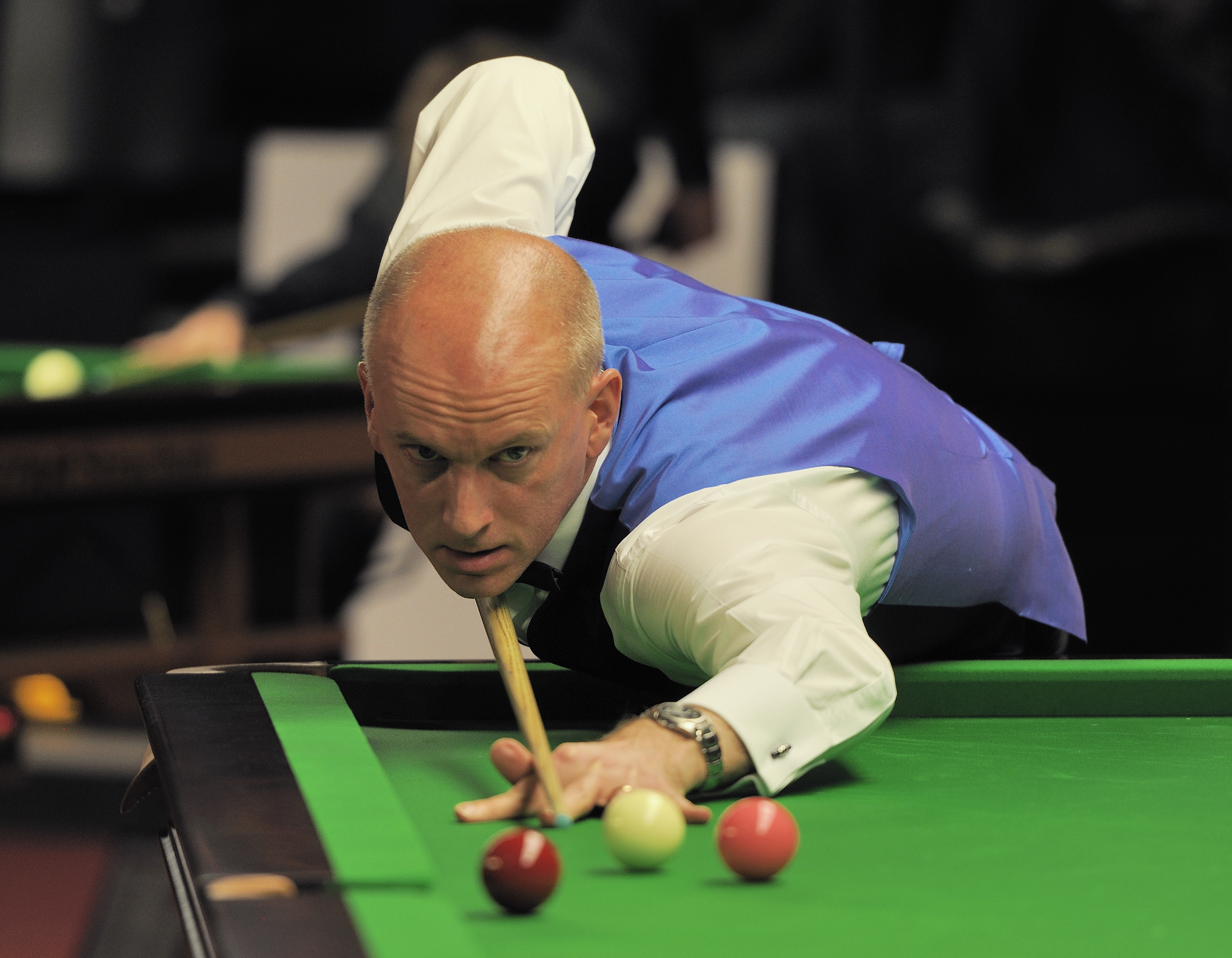
Peter Ebdon (pictured in 2014) defeated Ronnie O'Sullivan 16–14 to reach the final.

The semi-finals were played as the best of 31 frames, held over four sessions, between 2 and 4 May. O'Sullivan took the opening frame, but Ebdon led 2–1. In frame four, O'Sullivan potted the last pink to secure the frame, but then made a foul, playing the black with one hand before the cue ball had come to rest. Seven penalty points were awarded to Ebdon by the referee, Lawrie Annandale, but O'Sullivan took the frame. Ebdon also led 3–2 and 4–3, making a century break to close the first session. In the second session, O'Sullivan tied the match at 5–5, but Ebdon won four consecutive frames, featuring breaks of 57, 58, and 107, to build a 9–5 lead. O'Sullivan made three century breaks and further breaks of 63, 94, and 66 as he levelled the scores at 11–11 at the conclusion of the third session. The second of those century breaks, a 139, was his 100th in professional competition. Ebdon then recorded a 100 break to go 13–11 in front. O'Sullivan recovered with breaks of 77 and 85 to tie at 14–14, before Ebdon won the last two frames for a 16–14 victory.

Hendry made a 98 break in the first frame against Bond, who built a 3–1 lead with breaks of 55 and 77. Hendry secured the remaining three frames of the first session to lead 4–3. John Dee, reporting for The Daily Telegraph, wrote that Hendry "stuttered through a series of mishaps until a surge of form after the interval." Hendry compiled breaks of 77, 52, 64, 121, 76, and 71 as he won six of the seven frames played in the second session, which ended with a 10–4 scoreline. Hendry extended his lead to seven frames by taking the first frame of the third session with a half-century, but Bond then won three frames in succession. Hendry made a 113 break in frame 19 and also took the remaining three of the session to lead 15–7. He only needed one frame of the fourth session to secure a place in the final.

=== Final ===
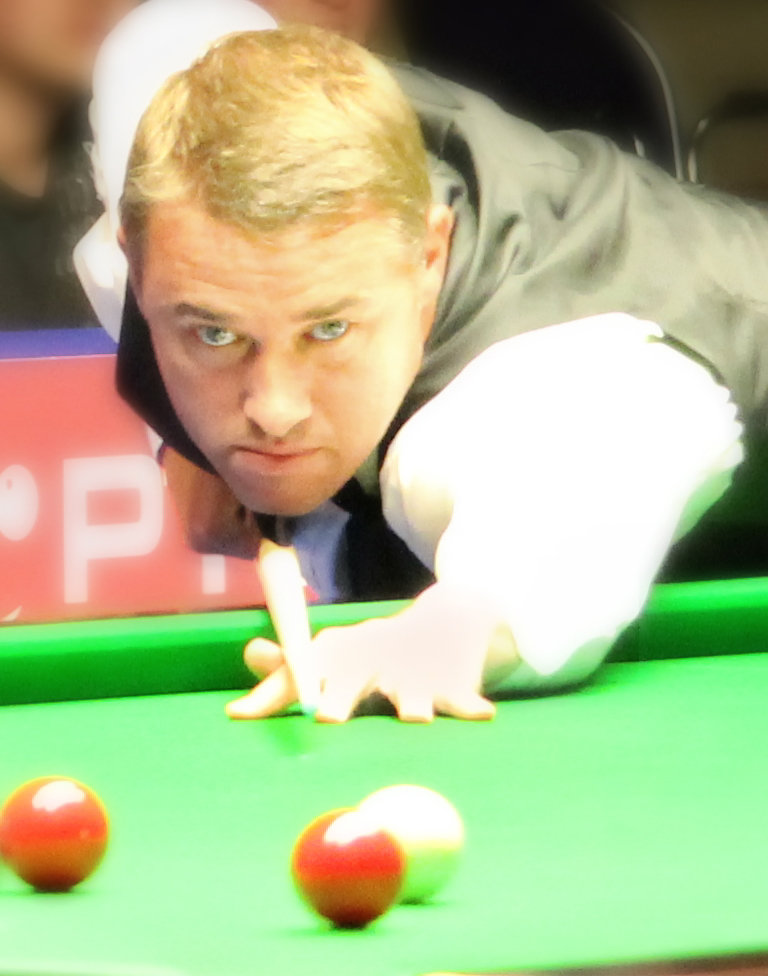
Stephen Hendry (pictured in 2011) defeated Peter Ebdon 18–12 in the final to claim his fifth consecutive World Championship. He tied Ray Reardon and Steve Davis, with six titles in the modern era.

The best-of-35-frame final took place over four sessions on 5 and 6 May between Hendry and Ebdon. Referee John Williams officiated the match. Ebdon produced a 79 break as he took the opening frame. Hendry won the second, but Ebdon built a 4–2 lead. Hendry made an 83 break in the last frame of the first session to halve the deficit. Hendry then took the first two frames of the second session to take the lead. In the third, he attempted a maximum break, but he missed the final brown ball and ended the break on 125. He would have won a £164,000 bonus of he had completed a 147: £147,000 for a maximum break and £17,000 for the highest break of the tournament. The next two frames were shared and Ebdon took frame 13 on a re-spotted black, before Hendry secured the last three frames of the day to lead 10–6 overnight. The third session was shared, with four half-centuries by Hendry and three by Ebdon. Resuming at 14–10 ahead, Hendry won three consecutive frames at the start of the last session to increase his lead to seven frames, with only one more needed for victory. Ebdon took frames 28 and 29, before Hendry sealed an 18–12 victory with a 73 break in the 30th. It was the first final at the Crucible at which the World Champion did not take the last shot of the championship. Needing snookers, Ebdon missed a shot and decided to concede the match rather than let Hendry continue.

"Peter [Ebdon] ... is the toughest in the world to play against at the moment, though I didn't think either of us played well and I was poor in the first session," Hendry said. He later wrote that as he shook Ebdon's hand he told Ebdon that "You're a hard bastard to beat." After the final, Ebdon said that he had felt "jaded and fatigued" on the first day, following his three previous matches. Snooker journalist and historian Clive Everton commented that "Even for Ebdon's famed mental stamina, the final that year was a match too far." "Stephen [Hendry], without question, is the greatest player the game has seen but I would fancy my chances more in a year's time. His experience of the big occasion showed in this match and my lack of experience was a major factor. I tried for my life today, it just didn't happen," Ebdon said. In David Hendon's 2025 book Pots of Gold, Ebdon reflected: "I wasn't ready for that sort of test, with that sort of pressure, against the person who was then the greatest player of all time. Stephen's mentality as a winner was second to none."

It was Hendry's fifth consecutive title, a record for the modern era. Hendry felt that the result, equalling Ray Reardon's and Davis's record of six wins in the modern era, meant that "the path was now clear" to setting a new record. The clothing company Sweater Shop, which sponsored Hendry, awarded him a red Ferrari 348 convertible. The company's owner Graham de Zille flew Hendry and his wife Mandy to Mugello Circuit by private jet so that Hendry could drive the circuit in a selection of Ferrari cars. BBC commentator Ted Lowe retired after the conclusion of the final. In the annual update to the world rankings which were calculated following the tournament on the basis of results over two years, Hendry retained the top place that he had held since 1990, with 36,911 points. John Higgins rose from eleventh to second with 32,341 points and Ebdon moved from tenth to third on 28,115 points.

== Main draw ==
The draw for the main tournament is shown below. The numbers in parentheses after the players' names denote the seedings for the 16 seeded players. The match winners are shown in bold.

**First round** Best of 19 frames
20 April
**Stephen Hendry (SCO) (1)**	**10**
Jason Ferguson (ENG)	8
21 & 22 April
David Roe (ENG) (16)	9
**Gary Wilkinson (ENG)**	**10**
23 April
**Ken Doherty (IRL) (9)**	**10**
Nick Terry (ENG)	5
24 April
**Darren Morgan (WAL) (8)**	**10**
Drew Henry (SCO)	8
24 & 25 April
**James Wattana (THA) (5)**	**10**
Jimmy Michie (ENG)	8
22 & 23 April
**Nigel Bond (ENG) (12)**	**10**
Anthony Hamilton (ENG)	9
20 & 21 April
**Dave Harold (ENG) (13)**	**10**
Neal Foulds (ENG)	4
21 & 22 April
John Parrott (ENG) (4)	6
**Rod Lawler (ENG)**	**10**
20 & 21 April
**Ronnie O'Sullivan (ENG) (3)**	**10**
Alain Robidoux (CAN)	3
20 & 21 April
**Tony Drago (MLT) (14)**	**10**
Steve James (ENG)	2
23 & 24 April
**John Higgins (SCO) (11)**	**10**
Martin Clark (ENG)	5
22 & 23 April
**Alan McManus (SCO) (6)**	**10**
Mick Price (ENG)	5
24 & 25 April
**Jimmy White (ENG) (7)**	**10**
Euan Henderson (SCO)	9
20 & 21 April
**Peter Ebdon (ENG) (10)**	**10**
Dene O'Kane (NZL)	1
23 & 24 April
**Terry Griffiths (WAL) (15)**	**10**
Jamie Burnett (SCO)	9
22 April
**Steve Davis (ENG) (2)**	**10**
Willie Thorne (ENG)	8

**Second round** Best of 25 frames
26 & 27 April
**Stephen Hendry (SCO) (1)**	**13**
Gary Wilkinson (ENG)	7
28 & 29 April
Ken Doherty (IRL) (9)	5
**Darren Morgan (WAL) (8)**	**13**
27, 28 & 29 April
James Wattana (THA) (5)	4
**Nigel Bond (ENG) (12)**	**13**
25, 26 & 27 April
**Dave Harold (ENG) (13)**	**13**
Rod Lawler (ENG)	6
25 & 26 April
**Ronnie O'Sullivan (ENG) (3)**	**13**
Tony Drago (MLT) (14)	4
27, 28 & 29 April
**John Higgins (SCO) (11)**	**13**
Alan McManus (SCO) (6)	5
28 & 29 April
Jimmy White (ENG) (7)	12
**Peter Ebdon (ENG) (10)**	**13**
26 & 27 April
Terry Griffiths (WAL) (15)	8
**Steve Davis (ENG) (2)**	**13**

**Quarter-finals**; Best of 25 frames
30 April & 1 May
**Stephen Hendry (SCO) (1)**	**13**
Darren Morgan (WAL) (8)	5
30 April & 1 May
**Nigel Bond (ENG) (12)**	**13**
Dave Harold (ENG) (13)	7
30 April & 1 May
**Ronnie O'Sullivan (ENG) (3)**	**13**
John Higgins (SCO) (11)	12
30 April & 1 May
**Peter Ebdon (ENG) (10)**	**13**
Steve Davis (ENG) (2)	10

**Semi-finals**; Best of 31 frames
2, 3 & 4 May
**Stephen Hendry (SCO) (1)**	**16**
Nigel Bond (ENG) (12)	7
2, 3 & 4 May
Ronnie O'Sullivan (ENG) (3)	14
**Peter Ebdon (ENG) (10)**	**16**

**Final**; Best of 35 frames
5 & 6 May
**Stephen Hendry (SCO) (1)**	**18**
Peter Ebdon (ENG) (10)	12

=== Final: frame scores ===
Final: (Best of 35 frames) Crucible Theatre, Sheffield, 5 & 6 May 1996; Referee: John Williams
**Stephen Hendry (SCO)** (1)				**18**–12			Peter Ebdon (ENG) (10)			
Session 1: 3–4
Frame	1	2	3	4	5	6	7	8	9	10
Hendry	2	**75**^{†}	34	34	**65**^{†}	18	**103**^{†} (83)	N/A	N/A	N/A
Ebdon	**121**^{†} (79)	42	**78**^{†} (59)	**61**^{†}	51	**57**^{†}	4	N/A	N/A	N/A
Session 2: 7–2 (10–6)
Frame	1	2	3	4	5	6	7	8	9	10
Hendry	**74**^{†}	**60**^{†}	**125**^{†} (125)	22	**70**^{†} (60)	70 (70)	**134**^{†} (55, 79)	**75**^{†}	**82**^{†}	N/A
Ebdon	39	58	0	**81**^{†} (68)	31	**77**^{†} (51)	0	0	0	N/A
Session 3: 4–4 (14–10)
Frame	1	2	3	4	5	6	7	8	9	10
Hendry	**85**^{†} (55)	1	**86**^{†} (58)	**83**^{†} (83)	34	0	60	**96**^{†} (57)	N/A	N/A
Ebdon	14	**75**^{†} (61)	21	23	**89**^{†}	**77**^{†} (77)	**66**^{†} (51)	0	N/A	N/A
Session 4: 4–2 (**18**–12)
Frame	1	2	3	4	5	6	7	8	9	10
Hendry	**54**^{†}	**78**^{†}	**77**^{†}	1	39	**73**^{†} (73)	N/A	N/A	N/A	N/A
Ebdon	27	23	25	**71**^{†}	**83**^{†} (52)	16	N/A	N/A	N/A	N/A
125				Highest break			79			
1				Century breaks			0			
11				50+ breaks			8			
Stephen Hendry wins the 1996 World Snooker Championship; Breaks over 50 are shown in parentheses. † = Winner of frame

== Qualifying results ==
Ten qualifying rounds were played.

=== Round 1 ===
Results for round 1 are shown below.

- John Daniels (ENG) 5–4 Marcus Lord (ENG)
- Munraj Pal (ENG) 5–4 Garoid O'Connor (ENG)

=== Rounds 2–6 ===
Results for rounds 2 to 6 are shown below.

Second qualifying round Best of 9 frames
Paul Stockwell (ENG)	5
David Blakey (ENG)	2
Eddie Barker (ENG)	5
Simon Bedford (ENG)	4
Kamal Jit Singh (ENG)	5
Mohammed Shazi (ENG)	2
Robert Harrhy (WAL)	5
Mark Colmer (ENG)	1
Anthony Massey (ENG)	w/o
Craig Newson (ENG)	w/d
Richard Jones (WAL)	5
David Thompson (ENG)	1
Myles Deleuse (ENG)	5
Richard Alford (ENG)	1
Dean Richardson (ENG)	5
Graham Francis (ENG)	0
Neal Jones (ENG)	5
Paul Reeve (ENG)	4
Donal Bonar (IRL)	w/o
Paul Burrell (RSA)	w/d
Jason Dunworth (ENG)	5
Andrew Hall (ENG)	0
Lee Mallen (ENG)	5
Vipul Patel (ENG)	2
Stephen Tierney (SCO)	5
Miles Green (ENG)	0
Huseyin Hursid (TUR)	5
Udesh Pillay (ENG)	4
Gary Thomson (SCO)	5
Rogelio Esteiro (ENG)	1
Jason Curtis (ENG)	5
Eden Butterworth (ENG)	3
John Whitty (ENG)	5
Hitesh Lakhani (ENG)	2
Andreas Ahmed (ENG)	5
Alex Peart (JAM)	1
Colin Donaldson (SCO)	w/o
Steven Cook (ENG)	w/d
Leo Fernandez (IRL)	5
Johan van Goetham (BEL)	3
Karen Corr (NIR)	w/o
Dean Bracey (ENG)	w/d
Neil Gilder (ENG)	5
Andrew Milliard (ENG)	0
Stuart Bingham (ENG)	5
Robert Grenville-Smith (ENG)	0
Paul Hunter (ENG)	5
Andrea Barbacane (ITA)	0
Darren Swinburn (ENG)	5
Steven de Baets (BEL)	1
Stephen Waldron (ENG)	5
David Manley (WAL)	3
Gareth Atkins (ENG)	5
Grant Conquest (ENG)	3
John Buckley (IRL)	w/o
Stephen Pieroni (ENG)	w/d
John Wilson (ENG)	5
Evan Munro (SCO)	2
Neil Johnson (ENG)	5
David Mole (ENG)	2
Sanjay Meghani (ENG)	5
Mark Canovan (NZL)	3
Justyn Barnes (ENG)	5
Carl Stringer (ENG)	4
Paul Radin (ENG)	5
David Athorn (ENG)	1
Richard Somauroo (ENG)	w/o
Steve Harrod (ENG)	w/d
Chris Shade (SCO)	5
Norman MacLachlan (SCO)	2
Julian Mills (ENG)	5
Gary Skipworth (ENG)	3
Steve Day (ENG)	5
Ian Barry Stark (ENG)	3
Del Smith (ENG)	5
Paul McCullough (ENG)	4
Jamie Moreland (ENG)	5
Damian Astre (ENG)	4
Robert Milkins (ENG)	5
Mark Ganderton (ENG)	3
Matt Jones (WAL)	5
Rajan Sharma (ENG)	3
Philip Minchin (ENG)	5
Dessie Sheehan (IRL)	4
Paul Clarke (ENG)	5
Ian Glover (ENG)	0
Kevin Smith (ENG)	5
Kristjan Helgason (ISL)	4
Grant Peabody (ENG)	w/o
Quinten Hann (AUS)	w/d
Mark Whatley (ENG)	5
Juan Rosales (CHL)	4
Ahmed Osman (BEL)	5
Zulfigar Cheema (PAK)	0
Barry Mapstone (ENG)	5
Kevin Sullivan (ENG)	4
Mark Weston (ENG)	5
Tony Brown (ENG)	1
Tony Kenny (ENG)	5
Stephen Jamieson (ENG)	0
Shaun Wilkes (ENG)	5
Munier Cassim (RSA)	4
Stephen Ormerod (ENG)	5
Gary Clarke (ENG)	3
Mark Congram (ENG)	5
Gary Irvine (NIR)	3
Indika Dodangoda (LKA)	5
Neil Hoggarth (ENG)	2
Johan Oenema (NED)	5
Paul Green (ENG)	0
Guo Hua (CHN)	5
James O'Sullivan (ENG)	2
Elliott Clark (ENG)	5
John Mills (WAL)	3
Kieran McMahon (NIR)	5
Neville Atkins (ENG)	0
Mark Love (ENG)	5
Johangir Khan (ENG)	0
Eddie Glass (ENG)	5
Andrew Highfield (ENG)	4
Paul Fung (HKG)	5
Christopher McGee (ENG)	4
Matthew Bray (ENG)	5
Nicholas Segal (ENG)	2
Anthony Bridge (ENG)	0
John Daniels (ENG)	5
Shaun Berry (ENG)	0
Munraj Pal (ENG)	5

Third qualifying round Best of 9 frames
Matthew McGrotty (ENG)	5
Paul Stockwell (ENG)	0
Roy Bigg (ENG)	5
Eddie Barker (ENG)	1
Peter Bullen (BEL)	3
Kamal Jit Singh (ENG)	5
Matthew Spade (ENG)	4
Robert Harrhy (WAL)	5
Paul Dawson (ENG)	5
Anthony Massey (ENG)	0
Richard King (ENG)	4
Richard Jones (WAL)	5
Will Jerram (ENG)	5
Myles Deleuse (ENG)	3
Damian Massey (ENG)	4
Dean Richardson (ENG)	5
Andrew Peters (WAL)	5
Neal Jones (ENG)	4
Anthony Buckley (ENG)	w/o
Donal Bonar (IRL)	w/d
Declan Hughes (NIR)	3
Jason Dunworth (ENG)	5
Richard Batty (ENG)	4
Lee Mallen (ENG)	5
Anthony Taylor (ENG)	4
Stephen Tierney (SCO)	5
Andrew Duff (SCO)	5
Huseyin Hursid (TUR)	0
Andy Neck (ENG)	1
Gary Thomson (SCO)	5
Scott Cooney (ENG)	3
Jason Curtis (ENG)	5
Ian Williamson (ENG)	1
John Whitty (ENG)	5
Jack Fitzmaurice (ENG)	5
Andreas Ahmed (ENG)	4
Nick Spelman (ENG)	5
Colin Donaldson (SCO)	3
Karl Townsend (ENG)	1
Leo Fernandez (IRL)	5
Mario Wehrmann (NED)	0
Karen Corr (NIR)	5
Steven Gough (ENG)	1
Neil Gilder (ENG)	5
Darren Paris (SUI)	5
Stuart Bingham (ENG)	2
Patrick Wallace (NIR)	2
Paul Hunter (ENG)	5
Chris Barnard (ENG)	5
Darren Swinburn (ENG)	3
Brett Patmore (ENG)	5
Stephen Waldron (ENG)	3
John Dunning (ENG)	4
Gareth Atkins (ENG)	5
Neil Selman (ENG)	w/o
John Buckley (IRL)	w/d
Mark Miller (ENG)	5
John Wilson (ENG)	2
Alan Edmonds (ENG)	2
Neil Johnson (ENG)	5
Michael O'Sullivan (ENG)	5
Sanjay Meghani (ENG)	0
Iain Trimble (ENG)	2
Justyn Barnes (ENG)	5
Jimmy Singh (ENG)	5
Paul Radin (ENG)	2
Lyndon Smith (ENG)	w/d
Richard Somauroo (ENG)	w/o
Alfonso Bellusci (ENG)	2
Chris Shade (SCO)	5
Stephen Popplewell (ENG)	5
Julian Mills (ENG)	1
Andrew Radford (ENG)	2
Steve Day (ENG)	5
Nick Jones (WAL)	1
Del Smith (ENG)	5
Simon Smith (ENG)	5
Jamie Moreland (ENG)	3
Lee Walker (WAL)	3
Robert Milkins (ENG)	5
James Vicarey (ENG)	5
Matt Jones (WAL)	4
Raymon Fabrie (NED)	5
Philip Minchin (ENG)	0
Richard Culham (ENG)	3
Paul Clarke (ENG)	5
Chris O'Sullivan (ENG)	w/d
Kevin Smith (ENG)	w/o
John Herbert (WAL)	5
Grant Peabody (ENG)	1
Glenn Stevenson (ENG)	1
Mark Whatley (ENG)	5
Adrian Gunnell (ENG)	5
Ahmed Osman (BEL)	1
Stephen Kershaw (ENG)	5
Barry Mapstone (ENG)	2
Bjorn Haneveer (BEL)	5
Mark Weston (ENG)	3
Graham Cripsey (ENG)	5
Tony Kenny (ENG)	3
Ryan Michael (ENG)	5
Shaun Wilkes (ENG)	3
Hugh Abernethy (SCO)	5
Stephen Ormerod (ENG)	1
Andrew Photiou (ENG)	5
Mark Congram (ENG)	3
Scott Rigg (ENG)	5
Indika Dodangoda (LKA)	4
Jason Greaves (ENG)	5
Johan Oenema (NED)	3
Darren Shaw (ENG)	4
Guo Hua (CHN)	5
Matt Bailey (ENG)	5
Elliott Clark (ENG)	0
Jonathan Bagley (ENG)	5
Kieran McMahon (NIR)	4
John Manley (ENG)	2
Mark Love (ENG)	5
Geoff Dunn (SCO)	5
Eddie Glass (ENG)	4
Lee Walters (ENG)	0
Paul Fung (HKG)	5
Graham Stevens (ENG)	2
Matthew Bray (ENG)	5
Tim Dunphy (IRL)	w/d
John Daniels (ENG)	w/o
Terrance Burke (ENG)	w/d
Munraj Pal (ENG)	w/o

Fourth qualifying round Best of 9 frames
Gary Peters (WAL)	2
Matthew McGrotty (ENG)	5
Neil Tomkins (WAL)	5
Roy Bigg (ENG)	4
Neil Wood (ENG)	5
Kamal Jit Singh (ENG)	0
Jason Whittaker (ENG)	1
Robert Harrhy (WAL)	5
John Bayliss (ENG)	5
Paul Dawson (ENG)	4
Robert Chapman (ENG)	5
Richard Jones (WAL)	4
Steve Harrison (ENG)	5
Will Jerram (ENG)	0
Martin Dziewialtowski (SCO)	5
Dean Richardson (ENG)	1
Peter Gilchrist (ENG)	1
Andrew Peters (WAL)	5
Alistair Fleming (SCO)	5
Anthony Buckley (ENG)	4
Michael Leach (ENG)	5
Jason Dunworth (ENG)	3
Jamie Rous (ENG)	1
Lee Mallen (ENG)	5
Steve Archer (ENG)	5
Stephen Tierney (SCO)	0
Mark Fenton (WAL)	5
Andrew Duff (SCO)	1
Darren Lennox (IRL)	4
Gary Thomson (SCO)	5
Andrew Atkinson (ENG)	5
Jason Curtis (ENG)	2
Steve Ventham (ENG)	0
John Whitty (ENG)	5
Ian Bullimore (ENG)	5
Jack Fitzmaurice (ENG)	0
Paul Sweeny (ENG)	5
Nick Spelman (ENG)	2
Mark Williams (ENG)	0
Leo Fernandez (IRL)	5
Wayne Lloyd (WAL)	5
Karen Corr (NIR)	3
Darren Limburg (ENG)	5
Neil Gilder (ENG)	2
Julian Goodyear (ENG)	0
Darren Paris (SUI)	5
Dean Venables (ENG)	4
Paul Hunter (ENG)	5
Eddie Manning (ENG)	5
Chris Barnard (ENG)	0
Mario Geudens (BEL)	5
Brett Patmore (ENG)	2
Alfie Burden (ENG)	5
Gareth Atkins (ENG)	0
Stephen Taylor (ENG)	3
Neil Selman (ENG)	5
Sam Chong (MYS)	1
Mark Miller (ENG)	5
Peter McCullagh (ENG)	5
Neil Johnson (ENG)	1
Jason Smith (ENG)	0
Michael O'Sullivan (ENG)	5
Scott Bigham (SCO)	5
Justyn Barnes (ENG)	1
Steve Elliott (ENG)	5
Jimmy Singh (ENG)	4
Simon Parker (ENG)	5
Richard Somauroo (ENG)	3
Patrick Delsemme (BEL)	4
Chris Shade (SCO)	5
Craig Harrison (ENG)	5
Stephen Popplewell (ENG)	1
Graham Fisken (ENG)	5
Steve Day (ENG)	2
Mick Fisher (ENG)	w/d
Del Smith (ENG)	w/o
Wayne Saidler (ENG)	1
Simon Smith (ENG)	5
Paul Florence (ENG)	w/d
Robert Milkins (ENG)	w/o
Joe Jogia (ENG)	5
James Vicarey (ENG)	2
Jason Walton (ENG)	4
Raymon Fabrie (NED)	5
Mario Fernandez (IRL)	2
Paul Clarke (ENG)	5
Micky Roughan (IRL)	5
Kevin Smith (ENG)	1
Steve Whalley (ENG)	5
John Herbert (WAL)	3
Craig Bradshaw (ENG)	5
Mark Whatley (ENG)	2
Justin Buckingham (ENG)	3
Adrian Gunnell (ENG)	5
Matthew Stevens (WAL)	5
Stephen Kershaw (ENG)	4
Andrew Hannah (ENG)	5
Bjorn Haneveer (BEL)	4
Simon Morris (ENG)	5
Graham Cripsey (ENG)	1
Philip Seaton (ENG)	4
Ryan Michael (ENG)	5
Iwan Jones (WAL)	1
Hugh Abernethy (SCO)	5
David Singh (IND)	5
Andrew Photiou (ENG)	3
Philip Williams (WAL)	5
Scott Rigg (ENG)	3
Daniele Zagaroli (ITA)	4
Jason Greaves (ENG)	5
Shane Haines (ENG)	5
Guo Hua (CHN)	3
Ian Hurdman (ENG)	5
Matt Bailey (ENG)	3
Colm Gilcreest (IRL)	5
Jonathan Bagley (ENG)	4
Graham MacDonald (ENG)	2
Mark Love (ENG)	5
Pat Horne (ENG)	3
Geoff Dunn (SCO)	5
Steve Russell (ENG)	5
Paul Fung (HKG)	3
Carl Waters (ENG)	1
Matthew Bray (ENG)	5
Richard Wheelhouse (ENG)	5
John Daniels (ENG)	4
Tom Finstad (CAN)	4
Munraj Pal (ENG)	5

Fifth qualifying round Best of 9 frames
Anton Bishop (ENG)	5
Matthew McGrotty (ENG)	1
Mark Gray (ENG)	4
Neil Tomkins (WAL)	5
Robert Foxall (ENG)	5
Neil Wood (ENG)	3
Jason Pegram (ENG)	4
Robert Harrhy (WAL)	5
Gary Lees (ENG)	4
John Bayliss (ENG)	5
Graeme Dott (SCO)	5
Robert Chapman (ENG)	2
Steve Prest (ENG)	2
Steve Harrison (ENG)	5
Pat Kenny (ENG)	4
Martin Dziewialtowski (SCO)	5
Eddie Lott (ENG)	0
Andrew Peters (WAL)	5
Paul S. Davison (ENG)	5
Alistair Fleming (SCO)	1
Bjorn L'Orange (NOR)	5
Michael Leach (ENG)	0
David McLellan (SCO)	5
Lee Mallen (ENG)	2
Dermot McGlinchey (NIR)	4
Steve Archer (ENG)	5
John Lardner (SCO)	3
Mark Fenton (WAL)	5
Paul Wykes (ENG)	5
Gary Thomson (SCO)	1
Anthony Harris (ENG)	4
Andrew Atkinson (ENG)	5
Tai Pichit (THA)	3
John Whitty (ENG)	5
Steve Duggan (ENG)	4
Ian Bullimore (ENG)	5
Mark O'Sullivan (IRL)	2
Paul Sweeny (ENG)	5
Leigh Robinson (ENG)	5
Leo Fernandez (IRL)	2
Sergio Beggiato (ENG)	5
Wayne Lloyd (WAL)	4
Mehmet Husnu (CYP)	2
Darren Limburg (ENG)	5
Joe Delaney (IRL)	5
Darren Paris (SUI)	4
David Rippon (ENG)	0
Paul Hunter (ENG)	5
Martin O'Neill (NIR)	5
Eddie Manning (ENG)	3
John Burns (ENG)	4
Mario Geudens (BEL)	5
Joe O'Boye (IRL)	3
Alfie Burden (ENG)	5
Paul Davison (ENG)	5
Neil Selman (ENG)	1
Wayne Brown (ENG)	5
Mark Miller (ENG)	3
David Wilson (ENG)	5
Peter McCullagh (ENG)	4
David Coles (ENG)	5
Michael O'Sullivan (ENG)	2
Mike Dunn (ENG)	5
Scott Bigham (SCO)	4
Darren Hackeson (ENG)	5
Steve Elliott (ENG)	3
Anthony O'Connor (IRL)	4
Simon Parker (ENG)	5
Sefton Payne (ENG)	4
Chris Shade (SCO)	5
Mukesh Parmar (ENG)	1
Craig Harrison (ENG)	5
Graham Horne (SCO)	3
Graham Fisken (ENG)	5
Garry Baldrey (ENG)	5
Del Smith (ENG)	2
Karl Burrows (ENG)	5
Simon Smith (ENG)	2
Amrik Cheema (IND)	1
Robert Milkins (ENG)	5
Murdo MacLeod (SCO)	5
Joe Jogia (ENG)	0
Bradley Jones (ENG)	5
Raymon Fabrie (NED)	0
Gareth Chilcott (WAL)	5
Paul Clarke (ENG)	3
Leigh Griffin (ENG)	2
Micky Roughan (IRL)	5
Matt Wilson (ENG)	5
Steve Whalley (ENG)	1
Scott MacFarlane (SCO)	5
Craig Bradshaw (ENG)	1
Ian McCulloch (ENG)	5
Adrian Gunnell (ENG)	1
Richy McDonald (SCO)	5
Matthew Stevens (WAL)	4
Shaun Mellish (ENG)	4
Andrew Hannah (ENG)	5
Nick Marsh (ENG)	1
Simon Morris (ENG)	5
Jamie Bodle (ENG)	4
Ryan Michael (ENG)	5
Joe Perry (ENG)	5
Hugh Abernethy (SCO)	1
Wayne Rendle (ENG)	5
David Singh (IND)	2
Nic Barrow (ENG)	0
Philip Williams (WAL)	5
Stuart Parnell (ENG)	5
Jason Greaves (ENG)	3
Ian Sargeant (WAL)	5
Shane Haines (ENG)	0
Alex Borg (MLT)	2
Ian Hurdman (ENG)	5
Craig MacGillivray (SCO)	5
Colm Gilcreest (IRL)	3
Suriya Suwannasingh (THA)	1
Mark Love (ENG)	5
Neil Mosley (ENG)	3
Geoff Dunn (SCO)	5
Sean Lynskey (ENG)	2
Steve Russell (ENG)	5
Steve Meakin (ENG)	2
Matthew Bray (ENG)	5
Michael Duffy (NIR)	5
Richard Wheelhouse (ENG)	2
Nick Pearce (ENG)	5
Munraj Pal (ENG)	2

Sixth qualifying round Best of 19 frames
Mark Rowing (ENG)	10
Anton Bishop (ENG)	1
Dominic Dale (WAL)	10
Neil Tomkins (WAL)	6
Ian Graham (ENG)	5
Robert Foxall (ENG)	10
Gerard Greene (NIR)	10
Robert Harrhy (WAL)	6
Matthew Couch (ENG)	5
John Bayliss (ENG)	10
Silvino Francisco (RSA)	4
Graeme Dott (SCO)	10
Troy Shaw (ENG)	10
Steve Harrison (ENG)	9
Jeff Cundy (ENG)	5
Martin Dziewialtowski (SCO)	10
Adrian Rosa (ENG)	10
Andrew Peters (WAL)	6
Steve Judd (ENG)	10
Paul S. Davison (ENG)	4
Ken Owers (ENG)	7
Bjorn L'Orange (NOR)	10
David McDonnell (IRL)	9
David McLellan (SCO)	10
Sean Lanigan (ENG)	4
Steve Archer (ENG)	10
Noppadon Noppachorn (THA)	10
Mark Fenton (WAL)	7
Joe Grech (MLT)	10
Paul Wykes (ENG)	5
Nick Dyson (ENG)	10
Andrew Atkinson (ENG)	1
Barry Pinches (ENG)	10
John Whitty (ENG)	6
Karl Payne (ENG)	10
Ian Bullimore (ENG)	3
Yasin Merchant (IND)	10
Paul Sweeny (ENG)	6
Jimmy Michie (ENG)	10
Leigh Robinson (ENG)	3
Stephen O'Connor (IRL)	10
Sergio Beggiato (ENG)	5
Tony Meo (ENG)	10
Darren Limburg (ENG)	4
Nick Walker (ENG)	10
Joe Delaney (IRL)	9
Robin Hull (FIN)	6
Paul Hunter (ENG)	10
Stuart Reardon (ENG)	5
Martin O'Neill (NIR)	10
Oliver King (ENG)	10
Mario Geudens (BEL)	1
Peter Lines (ENG)	10
Alfie Burden (ENG)	5
Dylan Leary (NIR)	7
Paul Davison (ENG)	10
Karl Broughton (ENG)	9
Wayne Brown (ENG)	10
Darryn Walker (ENG)	8
David Wilson (ENG)	10
Colin Morton (ENG)	10
David Coles (ENG)	6
Darren Clarke (ENG)	10
Mike Dunn (ENG)	7
Ian Brumby (ENG)	10
Darren Hackeson (ENG)	3
John Giles (ENG)	10
Simon Parker (ENG)	8
Robby Foldvari (AUS)	9
Chris Shade (SCO)	10
Stuart Pettman (ENG)	10
Craig Harrison (ENG)	5
Shokat Ali (PAK)	10
Graham Fisken (ENG)	7
Craig Edwards (ENG)	6
Garry Baldrey (ENG)	10
Eugene Hughes (IRL)	9
Karl Burrows (ENG)	10
Barry West (ENG)	2
Robert Milkins (ENG)	10
John Read (ENG)	10
Murdo MacLeod (SCO)	5
Jim Chambers (ENG)	10
Bradley Jones (ENG)	6
Andrew Cairns (ENG)	10
Gareth Chilcott (WAL)	6
Lee Richardson (ENG)	10
Micky Roughan (IRL)	4
Brian Rowswell (ENG)	7
Matt Wilson (ENG)	10
Jamie Woodman (ENG)	10
Scott MacFarlane (SCO)	6
Peter Daubney (ENG)	6
Ian McCulloch (ENG)	10
Nick Fruin (ENG)	6
Richy McDonald (SCO)	10
Jason Wallace (ENG)	10
Andrew Hannah (ENG)	8
Antony Bolsover (ENG)	10
Simon Morris (ENG)	5
Sean Storey (ENG)	10
Ryan Michael (ENG)	6
Euan Henderson (SCO)	10
Joe Perry (ENG)	5
Paul Davies (WAL)	10
Wayne Rendle (ENG)	3
Marcus Campbell (SCO)	10
Philip Williams (WAL)	3
Chris Scanlon (ENG)	10
Stuart Parnell (ENG)	8
Stefan Mazrocis (ENG)	10
Ian Sargeant (WAL)	7
Jason Weston (ENG)	8
Ian Hurdman (ENG)	10
Paul Cavney (ENG)	4
Craig MacGillivray (SCO)	10
Jamie Burnett (SCO)	10
Mark Love (ENG)	4
Jim Wych (CAN)	w/d
Geoff Dunn (SCO)	w/o
Michael Judge (IRL)	10
Steve Russell (ENG)	1
Gary Ponting (ENG)	10
Matthew Bray (ENG)	6
David Taylor (ENG)	10
Michael Duffy (NIR)	7
Surinder Gill (ENG)	10
Nick Pearce (ENG)	9

Note: w/o = walkover; w/d = withdrawn

=== Rounds 7–10 ===
Results for rounds 7 to 10 are shown below.

Round 7 Best of 19 frames
Mark Rowing (ENG)	7
Dominic Dale (WAL)	10
Robert Foxall (ENG)	5
Gerard Greene (NIR)	10
John Bayliss (ENG)	2
Graeme Dott (SCO)	10
Troy Shaw (ENG)	3
Martin Dziewialtowski (SCO)	10
Adrian Rosa (ENG)	7
Steve Judd (ENG)	10
Bjorn L'Orange (NOR)	5
David McLellan (SCO)	10
Steve Archer (ENG)	0
Noppadon Noppachorn (THA)	10
Joe Grech (MLT)	9
Nick Dyson (ENG)	10
Barry Pinches (ENG)	7
Karl Payne (ENG)	10
Yasin Merchant (IND)	7
Jimmy Michie (ENG)	10
Stephen O'Connor (IRL)	10
Tony Meo (ENG)	8
Nick Walker (ENG)	10
Paul Hunter (ENG)	4
Martin O'Neill (NIR)	10
Oliver King (ENG)	8
Peter Lines (ENG)	10
Paul Davison (ENG)	4
Wayne Brown (ENG)	10
David Wilson (ENG)	3
Colin Morton (ENG)	6
Darren Clarke (ENG)	10
Ian Brumby (ENG)	10
John Giles (ENG)	5
Chris Shade (SCO)	10
Stuart Pettman (ENG)	6
Shokat Ali (PAK)	9
Garry Baldrey (ENG)	10
Karl Burrows (ENG)	10
Robert Milkins (ENG)	7
John Read (ENG)	10
Jim Chambers (ENG)	2
Andrew Cairns (ENG)	10
Lee Richardson (ENG)	9
Matt Wilson (ENG)	5
Jamie Woodman (ENG)	10
Ian McCulloch (ENG)	10
Richy McDonald (SCO)	5
Jason Wallace (ENG)	9
Antony Bolsover (ENG)	10
Sean Storey (ENG)	8
Euan Henderson (SCO)	10
Paul Davies (WAL)	10
Marcus Campbell (SCO)	8
Chris Scanlon (ENG)	10
Stefan Mazrocis (ENG)	8
Ian Hurdman (ENG)	3
Craig MacGillivray (SCO)	10
Jamie Burnett (SCO)	10
Geoff Dunn (SCO)	1
Michael Judge (IRL)	10
Gary Ponting (ENG)	9
David Taylor (ENG)	6
Surinder Gill (ENG)	10

Round 8 Best of 19 frames
Joe Johnson (ENG)	7
Dominic Dale (WAL)	10
Doug Mountjoy (WAL)	4
Gerard Greene (NIR)	10
Terry Murphy (NIR)	10
Graeme Dott (SCO)	8
Anthony Davies (WAL)	10
Martin Dziewialtowski (SCO)	7
Nick Terry (ENG)	10
Steve Judd (ENG)	9
Stephen Murphy (IRL)	10
David McLellan (SCO)	8
Drew Henry (SCO)	10
Noppadon Noppachorn (THA)	6
Mark Johnston-Allen (ENG)	4
Nick Dyson (ENG)	10
David Finbow (ENG)	10
Karl Payne (ENG)	9
Tony Jones (ENG)	4
Jimmy Michie (ENG)	10
Tony Chappel (WAL)	10
Stephen O'Connor (IRL)	8
Billy Snaddon (SCO)	9
Nick Walker (ENG)	10
Stephen Lee (ENG)	10
Martin O'Neill (NIR)	7
Chris Small (SCO)	10
Peter Lines (ENG)	7
Steve Newbury (WAL)	9
Wayne Brown (ENG)	10
Rod Lawler (ENG)	10
Darren Clarke (ENG)	8
Mike Hallett (ENG)	10
Ian Brumby (ENG)	5
Jonathan Birch (ENG)	10
Chris Shade (SCO)	9
Mark Flowerdew (ENG)	10
Garry Baldrey (ENG)	4
Mark Davis (ENG)	10
Karl Burrows (ENG)	7
Mark King (ENG)	10
John Read (ENG)	9
Wayne Jones (WAL)	10
Andrew Cairns (ENG)	7
Fergal O'Brien (IRL)	10
Jamie Woodman (ENG)	7
Nigel Gilbert (ENG)	8
Ian McCulloch (ENG)	10
Les Dodd (ENG)	6
Antony Bolsover (ENG)	10
Paul McPhillips (SCO)	5
Euan Henderson (SCO)	10
Cliff Thorburn (CAN)	3
Paul Davies (WAL)	10
Jason Prince (NIR)	10
Chris Scanlon (ENG)	4
Mark Bennett (WAL)	9
Craig MacGillivray (SCO)	10
Mark Williams (WAL)	8
Jamie Burnett (SCO)	10
Danny Fowler (ENG)	10
Michael Judge (IRL)	7
Alex Higgins (NIR)	7
Surinder Gill (ENG)	10

Round 9 Best of 19 frames
Dominic Dale (WAL)	9
Gerard Greene (NIR)	10
Terry Murphy (NIR)	10
Anthony Davies (WAL)	6
Nick Terry (ENG)	10
Stephen Murphy (IRL)	1
Drew Henry (SCO)	10
Nick Dyson (ENG)	9
David Finbow (ENG)	5
Jimmy Michie (ENG)	10
Tony Chappel (WAL)	8
Nick Walker (ENG)	10
Stephen Lee (ENG)	8
Chris Small (SCO)	10
Wayne Brown (ENG)	6
Rod Lawler (ENG)	10
Mike Hallett (ENG)	10
Jonathan Birch (ENG)	8
Mark Flowerdew (ENG)	5
Mark Davis (ENG)	10
Mark King (ENG)	10
Wayne Jones (WAL)	5
Fergal O'Brien (IRL)	6
Ian McCulloch (ENG)	10
Antony Bolsover (ENG)	6
Euan Henderson (SCO)	10
Paul Davies (WAL)	10
Jason Prince (NIR)	9
Craig MacGillivray (SCO)	1
Jamie Burnett (SCO)	10
Danny Fowler (ENG)	10
Surinder Gill (ENG)	7

Round 10; Best of 19 frames
Jason Ferguson (ENG)	10
Gerard Greene (NIR)	8
Gary Wilkinson (ENG)	10
Terry Murphy (NIR)	4
Dean Reynolds (ENG)	7
Nick Terry (ENG)	10
Tony Knowles (ENG)	8
Drew Henry (SCO)	10
Andy Hicks (ENG)	6
Jimmy Michie (ENG)	10
Anthony Hamilton (ENG)	10
Nick Walker (ENG)	3
Neal Foulds (ENG)	10
Chris Small (SCO)	9
Dennis Taylor (NIR)	5
Rod Lawler (ENG)	10
Alain Robidoux (CAN)	10
Mike Hallett (ENG)	8
Steve James (ENG)	10
Mark Davis (ENG)	7
Martin Clark (ENG)	10
Mark King (ENG)	5
Mick Price (ENG)	10
Ian McCulloch (ENG)	6
Joe Swail (NIR)	9
Euan Henderson (SCO)	10
Dene O'Kane (NZL)	10
Paul Davies (WAL)	7
Brian Morgan (ENG)	7
Jamie Burnett (SCO)	10
Willie Thorne (ENG)	10
Danny Fowler (ENG)	4

== Century breaks ==
A total of 48 century breaks were made during the main stage of the tournament, setting a record that lasted until the 1998 edition. The highest was a 144, made by both Tony Drago and Peter Ebdon. Stephen Hendry compiled 11 century breaks in the tournament, one short of his record of 12 set the previous year.

- 144, 138, 137, 123, 109, 107, 100, 100 – Peter Ebdon
- 144, 115 – Tony Drago
- 139, 126, 120, 106, 103, 102, 102, 101, 100 – Ronnie O'Sullivan
- 137, 130, 104, 101 – John Higgins
- 135, 125, 121, 118, 113, 110, 108, 106, 105, 104, 104 – Stephen Hendry
- 129 – Jason Ferguson
- 125 – Alan McManus
- 123, 120, 101 – Dave Harold
- 116, 105, 104, 103 – Steve Davis
- 115 – Anthony Hamilton
- 110 – Darren Morgan
- 109 – Ken Doherty
- 103 – Euan Henderson
- 100 – Jimmy White
