= 2003 Welsh Open (snooker) =

2003 Regal Welsh Open
Tournament information
- Dates: 22–26 January 2003
- Venue: Cardiff International Arena
- City: Cardiff
- Country: Wales
- Organisation: WPBSA
- Format: Ranking event
- Total prize fund: £597,200
- Winner's share: £82,500
- Highest break: Stephen Hendry (SCO) (140)

Final
- Champion: Stephen Hendry (SCO)
- Runner-up: Mark Williams (WAL)
- Score: 9–5

The 2003 Welsh Open (officially the 2003 Regal Welsh Open) was a professional ranking snooker tournament that took place from 22 to 26 January at the Cardiff International Arena in Cardiff, Wales.

Paul Hunter was the defending champion, but he lost in the semi-finals 2–6 against Mark Williams. Williams in turn lost to Stephen Hendry 9–5 in the final. Hendry won his third Welsh Open title and the 34th ranking title of his career.

== Tournament summary ==
Defending champion Paul Hunter was the number 1 seed with World Champion Peter Ebdon seeded 2. The remaining places were allocated to players based on the world rankings.

== Prize fund ==
The breakdown of prize money for this year is shown below:

Winner: £82,500
Runner-up: £42,500
Semi-final: £21,250
Quarter-final: £11,700
Last 16: £9,600
Last 32: £7,800
Last 48: £4,000
Last 64: £3,150

Last 80: £2,150
Last 96: £1,450

Stage one highest break: £1,800
Stage two highest break: £7,500

Stage one maximum break: £5,000
Stage two maximum break: £20,000

Total: £597,200

== Main draw ==
Last 32; Best of 9 frames
1	(England) Paul Hunter	5
53	(England) Mark Selby	1
11	(England) Mark King	2
(Republic of Ireland) Leo Fernandez	5
16	(Northern Ireland) Joe Swail	5
56	(England) Barry Pinches	3
6	(Republic of Ireland) Ken Doherty	5
25	(England) Steve Davis	2
5	(Scotland) John Higgins	5
31	(England) Ali Carter	4
12	(Scotland) Graeme Dott	3
39	(Finland) Robin Hull	5
13	(England) Joe Perry	5
51	(England) Barry Hawkins	2
4	(Wales) Mark Williams	5
19	(England) David Gray	2
3	(England) Ronnie O'Sullivan	5
17	(England) Anthony Hamilton	4
9	(Wales) Matthew Stevens	1
28	(Malta) Tony Drago	5
14	(Australia) Quinten Hann	2
27	(Hong Kong) Marco Fu	5
8	(England) Stephen Lee	5
21	(England) Dave Harold	3
7	(Scotland) Stephen Hendry	5
20	(Wales) Dominic Dale	1
15	(Scotland) Alan McManus	5
44	(Scotland) Jamie Burnett	3
10	(England) Jimmy White	2
(England) Rod Lawler	5
2	(England) Peter Ebdon	2
35	(England) Michael Holt	5

Last 16; Best of 9 frames
1	(England) Paul Hunter	5
(Republic of Ireland) Leo Fernandez	1
16	(Northern Ireland) Joe Swail	4
6	(Republic of Ireland) Ken Doherty	5
5	(Scotland) John Higgins	1
39	(Finland) Robin Hull	5
13	(England) Joe Perry	2
4	(Wales) Mark Williams	5
3	(England) Ronnie O'Sullivan	5
28	(Malta) Tony Drago	4
27	(Hong Kong) Marco Fu	5
8	(England) Stephen Lee	0
7	(Scotland) Stephen Hendry	5
15	(Scotland) Alan McManus	4
(England) Rod Lawler	5
35	(England) Michael Holt	3

Quarter-finals; Best of 9 frames
1	(England) Paul Hunter	5
6	(Republic of Ireland) Ken Doherty	2
39	(Finland) Robin Hull	4
4	(Wales) Mark Williams	5
3	(England) Ronnie O'Sullivan	3
27	(Hong Kong) Marco Fu	5
7	(Scotland) Stephen Hendry	5
(England) Rod Lawler	2

Semi-finals; Best of 11 frames
1	(England) Paul Hunter	2
4	(Wales) Mark Williams	6
27	(Hong Kong) Marco Fu	4
7	(Scotland) Stephen Hendry	6

Final; Best of 17 frames
4	(Wales) Mark Williams	5
7	(Scotland) Stephen Hendry	9

== Final ==
Final: Best of 17 frames. Referee: Eirian Williams. Cardiff International Arena, Cardiff, Wales, 26 January 2003.
Mark Williams (4); Wales	5–9	Stephen Hendry (7); Scotland
Afternoon: 64–0 (62), 0–127 (127), 26–90 (89), 0–140 (140), 25–83 (64), 59–49, 0–104 (104), 0–108 (108); Evening: 87–0 (87), 65–1 (54), 51–61, 62–0 (50), 31–79 (79), 0–91 (91)
87	Highest break	140
0	Century breaks	4
4	50+ breaks	8

== Qualifying ==
=== Round 1 ===
Best of 9 frames

(England) Shaun Murphy	1–5	(Wales) David John
(England) Joe Johnson	2–5	(England) Justin Astley
(Scotland) Martin Dziewialtowski	4–5	(Republic of Ireland) Leo Fernandez
(England) Paul Wykes	4–5	(England) Mark Gray
(England) Troy Shaw	3–5	(England) Munraj Pal
(England) Paul Davison	5–3	(Scotland) David McLellan
(England) Neal Foulds	1–5	(Australia) Johl Younger
(England) Craig Butler	5–1	(England) Jimmy Robertson
(England) Jeff Cundy	4–5	(England) Jamie Cope
(England) John Read	4–5	(Wales) Peter Roscoe
(England) Adrian Gunnell	5–4	(England) David Gilbert
(England) Peter Lines	5–4	(England) Darren Clarke
(England) Jason Ferguson	5–2	(Netherlands) Stefan Mazrocis
(England) Stephen Kershaw	5–0	(Scotland) Hugh Abernethy
(England) Matthew Couch	5–0	(Canada) Bob Chaperon
(England) Wayne Brown	1–5	(China) Pang Weiguo

(Wales) Lee Walker	5–3	(Wales) Matthew Farrant
(England) Luke Fisher	5–1	(England) Nick Pearce
(England) Tony Jones	5–3	(England) Eddie Manning
(Northern Ireland) Jason Prince	5–1	(India) Manan Chandra
(Thailand) Phaitoon Phonbun	3–5	(England) Jason Weston
(Wales) Paul Davies	5–4	(China) Jin Long
(Wales) Ryan Day	5–3	(Wales) James Reynolds
(England) Sean Storey	5–0	(Thailand) Kwan Poomjang
(England) Andrew Higginson	4–5	(England) Lee Spick
(Iceland) Kristján Helgason	5–2	(Republic of Ireland) Colm Gilcreest
(Scotland) Euan Henderson	5–1	(Netherlands) Mario Wehrman
(Canada) Alain Robidoux	3–5	(England) Simon Bedford
(England) Rod Lawler	5–1	(Thailand) Atthasit Mahitthi
(England) Andrew Norman	5–2	(Wales) David Donovan
(England) Rory McLeod	5–3	(England) Matthew Selt
(England) Antony Bolsover	4–5	(England) Ricky Walden

=== Round 2–5 ===
Round 2 Best of 9 frames
(Wales) David John	5
(England) Justin Astley	4
(Republic of Ireland) Leo Fernandez	5
(England) Mark Gray	3
(England) Munraj Pal	5
(England) Paul Davison	2
(Australia) Johl Younger	3
(England) Craig Butler	5
(England) Jamie Cope	5
(Wales) Peter Roscoe	2
(England) Adrian Gunnell	5
(England) Peter Lines	4
(England) Jason Ferguson	5
(England) Stephen Kershaw	2
(England) Matthew Couch	5
(China) Pang Weiguo	1
(Wales) Lee Walker	4
(England) Luke Fisher	5
(England) Tony Jones	5
(Northern Ireland) Jason Prince	2
(England) Jason Weston	4
(Wales) Paul Davies	5
(Wales) Ryan Day	4
(England) Sean Storey	5
(England) Lee Spick	5
(Iceland) Kristján Helgason	4
(Scotland) Euan Henderson	4
(England) Simon Bedford	5
(England) Rod Lawler	5
(England) Andrew Norman	4
(England) Rory McLeod	3
(England) Ricky Walden	5

Round 3 Best of 9 frames
(England) Mark Selby	5
(Wales) David John	4
(England) Dave Finbow	2
(Republic of Ireland) Leo Fernandez	5
(England) Barry Pinches	5
(England) Munraj Pal	2
(England) Nick Walker	3
(England) Craig Butler	5
(Northern Ireland) Gerard Greene	5
(England) Jamie Cope	3
(England) Stuart Pettman	5
(England) Adrian Gunnell	1
(England) Barry Hawkins	5
(England) Jason Ferguson	3
(England) Jimmy Michie	5
(England) Matthew Couch	3
(England) Bradley Jones	0
(England) Luke Fisher	5
(Wales) Darren Morgan	4
(England) Tony Jones	5
(Belgium) Bjorn Haneveer	2
(Wales) Paul Davies	5
(England) Stuart Bingham	3
(England) Sean Storey	5
(England) Andy Hicks	5
(England) Lee Spick	3
(England) Mike Dunn	5
(England) Simon Bedford	2
(Scotland) Stephen Maguire	4
(England) Rod Lawler	5
(England) Nick Dyson	5
(England) Ricky Walden	4

Round 4 Best of 9 frames
(England) Jonathan Birch	0
(England) Mark Selby	5
(Northern Ireland) Terry Murphy	3
(Republic of Ireland) Leo Fernandez	5
(Scotland) Billy Snaddon	4
(England) Barry Pinches	5
(England) Robert Milkins	5
(England) Craig Butler	4
(Scotland) Marcus Campbell	5
(Northern Ireland) Gerard Greene	3
(Finland) Robin Hull	5
(England) Stuart Pettman	2
(England) Alfie Burden	4
(England) Barry Hawkins	5
(England) David Roe	3
(England) Jimmy Michie	5
(England) Mark Davis	5
(England) Luke Fisher	0
(England) Brian Morgan	5
(England) Tony Jones	3
(England) Gary Wilkinson	5
(Wales) Paul Davies	2
(Pakistan) Shokat Ali	5
(England) Sean Storey	1
(England) Ian McCulloch	5
(England) Andy Hicks	1
(Scotland) Jamie Burnett	5
(England) Mike Dunn	2
(Northern Ireland) Patrick Wallace	4
(England) Rod Lawler	5
(England) Michael Holt	5
(England) Nick Dyson	2

Round 5 Best of 9 frames
(Scotland) Drew Henry	3
(England) Mark Selby	5
(Republic of Ireland) Fergal O'Brien	1
(Republic of Ireland) Leo Fernandez	5
(England) Nigel Bond	4
(England) Barry Pinches	5
(England) Steve Davis	5
(England) Robert Milkins	3
(England) Ali Carter	5
(Scotland) Marcus Campbell	3
(Scotland) Chris Small	3
(Finland) Robin Hull	5
(England) John Parrott	1
(England) Barry Hawkins	5
(England) David Gray	5
(England) Jimmy Michie	3
(England) Anthony Hamilton	5
(England) Mark Davis	0
(Malta) Tony Drago	5
(England) Brian Morgan	4
(Hong Kong) Marco Fu	5
(England) Gary Wilkinson	3
(England) Dave Harold	5
(Pakistan) Shokat Ali	2
(Wales) Dominic Dale	5
(England) Ian McCulloch	4
(Republic of Ireland) Michael Judge	1
(Scotland) Jamie Burnett	5
(Thailand) James Wattana	2
(England) Rod Lawler	5
(Wales) Anthony Davies	2
(England) Michael Holt	5

== Century breaks ==
- 140, 127, 124, 113, 108, 104 – Stephen Hendry
- 139 – Robin Hull
- 133 – Leo Fernandez
- 132 – Ali Carter
- 128 – Michael Holt
- 127 – John Higgins
- 120 – Anthony Hamilton
- 116, 100 – Mark Williams
- 110 – Paul Hunter
- 109, 104 – Ronnie O'Sullivan
- 109 – Alan McManus
- 101, 101 – Marco Fu
