= 1998 British Open =

Tournament information
- Dates: 2–12 April 1998
- Venue: Plymouth Pavilions
- City: Plymouth
- Country: England
- Organisation: WPBSA
- Format: Ranking event
- Total prize fund: £350,000
- Winner's share: £60,000
- Highest break: Anthony Hamilton (ENG) (141)

Final
- Champion: John Higgins (SCO)
- Runner-up: Stephen Hendry (SCO)
- Score: 9–8

The 1998 British Open was a professional ranking snooker tournament, that was held from 2–12 April 1998 at the Plymouth Pavilions, Plymouth, England.

John Higgins won the tournament by defeating Stephen Hendry nine frames to eight in the final. The defending champion, Mark Williams, was defeated by Higgins in the semi-final.

== Prize fund ==
The breakdown of prize money for this year is shown below:

- Winner: £60,000
- Final: £32,000
- Semi-final: £16,000
- Quarter-final: £9,100
- Last 16: £4,550
- Last 32: £2,600
- Last 64: £2,100
- Last 96: £1,200
- Stage one highest break: £1,000
- Stage two highest break: £5,000
- Total: £350,000

== Main draw ==
Last 64; Best of 9 frames
(Wales) Mark Williams	5
(England) David Gray	2
(Northern Ireland) Joe Swail	5
(England) Willie Thorne	0
(England) Anthony Hamilton	5
(England) Mark Davis	2
(England) Gary Wilkinson	5
(Scotland) Graeme Dott	0
(England) Stephen Lee	5
(Scotland) Craig MacGillivray	1
(Northern Ireland) Terry Murphy	1
(Wales) Paul Davies	5
(England) Ronnie O'Sullivan	5
(England) Bradley Jones	1
(England) Brian Morgan	5
(Wales) Mark Bennett	3
(England) Nigel Bond	3
(Wales) Matthew Stevens	5
(England) Mark King	5
(Wales) Lee Walker	4
(Wales) Darren Morgan	2
(England) John Read	5
(Republic of Ireland) Fergal O'Brien	3
(England) Gary Ponting	5
(England) Steve Davis	5
(Pakistan) Shokat Ali	3
(England) Mick Price	5
(England) Dean Reynolds	4
(Scotland) John Higgins	5
(Northern Ireland) Jason Prince	0
(England) Martin Clark	5
(Republic of Ireland) Michael Judge	4
(Scotland) Stephen Hendry	5
(England) Dave Finbow	0
(England) Andy Hicks	5
(England) Matthew Couch	4
(Scotland) Alan McManus	5
(England) Nick Pearce	3
(England) Dave Harold	5
(Scotland) Jamie Burnett	3
(Thailand) James Wattana	5
(England) Stefan Mazrocis	1
(England) Rod Lawler	5
(England) Nick Walker	1
(England) John Parrott	5
(England) Joe Perry	3
(Scotland) Chris Small	5
(Scotland) Drew Henry	3
(England) Peter Ebdon	4
(Wales) Dominic Dale	5
(England) Jimmy White	4
(England) Mark Gray	5
(Malta) Tony Drago	5
(England) Chris Scanlon	4
(England) Neal Foulds	5
(Wales) Anthony Davies	2
(Canada) Alain Robidoux	3
(England) Karl Burrows	5
(England) Steve James	2
(England) Joe Johnson	5
(Republic of Ireland) Ken Doherty	5
(New Zealand) Dene O'Kane	0
(Scotland) Billy Snaddon	5
(England) Peter McCullagh	4

Last 32; Best of 9 frames
(Wales) Mark Williams	5
(Northern Ireland) Joe Swail	1
(England) Anthony Hamilton	2
(England) Gary Wilkinson	5
(England) Stephen Lee	5
(Wales) Paul Davies	3
(England) Ronnie O'Sullivan	5
(England) Brian Morgan	4
(Wales) Matthew Stevens	4
(England) Mark King	5
(England) John Read	4
(England) Gary Ponting	5
(England) Steve Davis	5
(England) Mick Price	2
(Scotland) John Higgins	5
(England) Martin Clark	1
(Scotland) Stephen Hendry	5
(England) Andy Hicks	0
(Scotland) Alan McManus	4
(England) Dave Harold	5
(Thailand) James Wattana	4
(England) Rod Lawler	5
(England) John Parrott	5
(Scotland) Chris Small	4
(Wales) Dominic Dale	5
(England) Mark Gray	3
(Malta) Tony Drago	4
(England) Neal Foulds	5
(England) Karl Burrows	5
(England) Joe Johnson	2
(Republic of Ireland) Ken Doherty	5
(Scotland) Billy Snaddon	1

Last 16; Best of 9 frames
(Wales) Mark Williams	5
(England) Gary Wilkinson	4
(England) Stephen Lee	1
(England) Ronnie O'Sullivan	5
(England) Mark King	2
(England) Gary Ponting	5
(England) Steve Davis	1
(Scotland) John Higgins	5
(Scotland) Stephen Hendry	5
(England) Dave Harold	3
(England) Rod Lawler	0
(England) John Parrott	5
(Wales) Dominic Dale	4
(England) Neal Foulds	5
(England) Karl Burrows	0
(Republic of Ireland) Ken Doherty	5

Quarter-finals; Best of 9 frames
(Wales) Mark Williams	5
(England) Ronnie O'Sullivan	4
(England) Gary Ponting	4
(Scotland) John Higgins	5
(Scotland) Stephen Hendry	5
(England) John Parrott	1
(England) Neal Foulds	1
(Republic of Ireland) Ken Doherty	5

Semi-finals; Best of 11 frames
(Wales) Mark Williams	4
(Scotland) John Higgins	6
(Scotland) Stephen Hendry	6
(Republic of Ireland) Ken Doherty	4

Final; Best of 17 frames
(Scotland) John Higgins	9
(Scotland) Stephen Hendry	8

== Final ==
Final: Best of 17 frames. Referee: Alan Chamberlain; Plymouth Pavilions, Plymouth, England. 12 April 1998.
John Higgins; Scotland	9–8	Stephen Hendry; Scotland
Afternoon: 1–91, 19–64 (51), 68–29 (68), 61–63 (Higgins 61), 70–1 (63), 63–48, 22–79 (79), 52–7; Evening: 0–99 (99), 87–0 (51), 64–73, 128–0 (61), 67–69 (Higgins 59), 104–1 (72), 1–84 (58), 109–14 (102), 85–0 (85)
102	Highest break	99
1	Century breaks	0
8	50+ breaks	5
