= 2004 Players Championship (snooker) =

2004 Daily Record Players Championship
Tournament information
- Dates: 3–11 April 2004
- Venue: SECC
- City: Glasgow
- Country: Scotland
- Organisation: WPBSA
- Format: Ranking event
- Total prize fund: £597,200
- Winner's share: £82,500
- Highest break: Ken Doherty (IRL) (145)

Final
- Champion: Jimmy White (ENG)
- Runner-up: Paul Hunter (ENG)
- Score: 9–7

The 2004 Players Championship (officially the 2004 Daily Record Players Championship) was a professional ranking snooker tournament that took place between 3–11 April 2004 at the S.E.C.C in Glasgow, Scotland. It was the seventh and penultimate ranking event of the 2003/2004 season.

The tournament was a re-branding of the Scottish Open which had been held under various names since 1981. It was the last time the tournament was played until it returned to the calendar in 2016, under the original name from previous seasons.

Twelve years after his last ranking tournament success, Jimmy White aged 41 won his tenth ranking tournament by defeating Paul Hunter 9–7 in the final. This was White's first success in the tournament, having last appeared in the final in 1988 International Open, when he lost 12–6 to Steve Davis. It was also Hunter's last appearance in a ranking final.

== Prize fund ==
The breakdown of prize money for this year is shown below:

- Winner: £82,500
- Final: £42,500
- Semi-final: £21,500
- Quarter-final: £11,800
- Last 16: £9,700
- Last 32: £7,600
- Last 48: £4,200
- Last 64: £3,100
- Last 80: £2,200
- Last 96: £1,500
- Stage one highest break: £1,800
- Stage two highest break: £5,000
- Stage one maximum break: £5,000
- Stage two maximum break: £20,000
- Total: £597,200

== Main draw ==
Last 48; Best of 9 frames
32	(Finland) Robin Hull	w/d
(England) Rod Lawler	w/o
22	(England) Mark King	5
(England) Jimmy Michie	2
27	(Northern Ireland) Joe Swail	4
(England) Stuart Bingham	5
19	(Hong Kong) Marco Fu	5
(Scotland) Scott MacKenzie	1
30	(England) John Parrott	5
(England) Mark Davis	4
23	(England) Dave Harold	1
(England) Shaun Murphy	5
26	(England) Ian McCulloch	5
(England) Nigel Bond	4
25	(Scotland) Drew Henry	5
(England) Michael Holt	1
29	(England) Mark Selby	4
(China) Ding Junhui	5
31	(Wales) Anthony Davies	3
(Australia) Neil Robertson	5
20	(England) Anthony Hamilton	2
(Scotland) Jamie Burnett	5
24	(Malta) Tony Drago	4
(Wales) Ryan Day	5
17	(England) Ali Carter	5
(England) Stuart Pettman	1
21	(England) Robert Milkins	1
(England) Barry Pinches	5
28	(Wales) Dominic Dale	5
(England) Gary Wilkinson	4
18	(Scotland) Chris Small	2
(Northern Ireland) Gerard Greene	5

Last 32; Best of 9 frames
1	(Wales) Mark Williams	5
(England) Rod Lawler	4
9	(Wales) Matthew Stevens	3
(England) Mark King	5
7	(England) Peter Ebdon	5
(England) Stuart Bingham	3
13	(Scotland) Graeme Dott	5
(Hong Kong) Marco Fu	3
5	(England) Stephen Lee	4
(England) John Parrott	5
15	(England) Jimmy White	5
(England) Shaun Murphy	3
12	(England) David Gray	3
(England) Ian McCulloch	5
4	(Scotland) John Higgins	4
(Scotland) Drew Henry	5
8	(England) Paul Hunter	5
(China) Ding Junhui	0
11	(England) Steve Davis	5
(Australia) Neil Robertson	3
14	(Australia) Quinten Hann	3
(Scotland) Jamie Burnett	5
3	(England) Ronnie O'Sullivan	5
(Wales) Ryan Day	4
6	(Republic of Ireland) Ken Doherty	5
(England) Ali Carter	3
16	(England) Joe Perry	5
(England) Barry Pinches	4
10	(Scotland) Alan McManus	5
(Wales) Dominic Dale	1
2	(Scotland) Stephen Hendry	5
(Northern Ireland) Gerard Greene	1

Last 16; Best of 9 frames
1	(Wales) Mark Williams	5
(England) Mark King	4
7	(England) Peter Ebdon	5
13	(Scotland) Graeme Dott	3
(England) John Parrott	2
15	(England) Jimmy White	5
(England) Ian McCulloch	5
(Scotland) Drew Henry	1
8	(England) Paul Hunter	5
11	(England) Steve Davis	3
(Scotland) Jamie Burnett	0
3	(England) Ronnie O'Sullivan	5
6	(Republic of Ireland) Ken Doherty	5
16	(England) Joe Perry	2
10	(Scotland) Alan McManus	2
2	(Scotland) Stephen Hendry	5

Quarter-finals; Best of 9 frames
1	(Wales) Mark Williams	3
7	(England) Peter Ebdon	5
15	(England) Jimmy White	5
(England) Ian McCulloch	3
8	(England) Paul Hunter	5
3	(England) Ronnie O'Sullivan	2
6	(Republic of Ireland) Ken Doherty	5
2	(Scotland) Stephen Hendry	4

Semi-finals; Best of 11 frames
7	(England) Peter Ebdon	5
15	(England) Jimmy White	6
8	(England) Paul Hunter	6
6	(Republic of Ireland) Ken Doherty	2

Final; Best of 17 frames
15	(England) Jimmy White	9
8	(England) Paul Hunter	7

== Final ==
Final: Best of 17 frames. Referee: Colin Brinded. S.E.C.C., Glasgow, Scotland, 11 April 2004.
Jimmy White (15); England	9–7	Paul Hunter (8); England
Afternoon: 73–33, 76–50, 7–77, 9–63, 66–31, 28–56, 59–18, 27–58; Evening: 10–52, 70–2 (51), 64–33, 100–0 (56), 76–0 (76), 9–71 (67), 54–58, 74–8
76	Highest break	67
0	Century breaks	0
3	50+ breaks	1

== Qualifying ==
Qualifying for the tournament took place at Pontin's in Prestatyn, Wales between 11 and 15 March 2004.

=== Round 1 ===
Best of 9 frames

(England) Andrew Higginson	1–5	(England) Tom Ford
(Thailand) Atthasit Mahitthi	3–5	(Republic of Ireland) Joe Delaney
(England) Craig Butler	5–3	(Republic of Ireland) Garry Hardiman
(England) Tony Jones	0–5	(Norway) Kurt Maflin
(England) Paul Wykes	5–2	(England) Darryn Walker
(Australia) Johl Younger	2–5	(Scotland) Scott MacKenzie
(England) David Gilbert	3–5	(Wales) Ian Preece
(England) Matthew Couch	3–5	(England) Chris Melling
(Northern Ireland) Jason Prince	5–3	(England) Andy Neck
(England) Adrian Gunnell	w/o–w/d	(Canada) Alain Robidoux
(England) Wayne Brown	0–5	(Wales) Philip Williams
(Northern Ireland) Terry Murphy	3–5	(England) Luke Simmonds
(Iceland) Kristján Helgason	w/d–w/o	(Cyprus) Mehmet Husnu
(England) Luke Fisher	5–4	(England) Michael Wild
(England) Simon Bedford	5–4	(Wales) Ian Sargeant
(England) Peter Lines	2–5	(England) Adrian Rosa

(England) Rory McLeod	3–5	(China) Liu Song
(Wales) Ryan Day	5–1	(England) Carlo Giagnacovo
(England) Ricky Walden	2–5	(England) Michael Rhodes
(Scotland) Martin Dziewialtowski	5–1	(England) Ian Brumby
(Republic of Ireland) Colm Gilcreest	5–2	(Northern Ireland) Joe Meara
(England) Bradley Jones	4–5	(Australia) Neil Robertson
(England) Jamie Cope	5–1	(Thailand) Supoj Saenla
(Scotland) Billy Snaddon	4–5	(China) Ding Junhui
(Wales) Paul Davies	5–4	(England) Stephen Croft
(Thailand) Kwan Poomjang	3–5	(England) Paul Sweeny
(England) Andrew Norman	1–5	(Scotland) Gary Thomson
(England) Joe Johnson	3–5	(England) Stuart Mann
(Wales) Lee Walker	5–3	(England) Martin Gould
(England) Jason Ferguson	5–4	(England) James Leadbetter
(England) Munraj Pal	5–1	(Australia) Steve Mifsud
(Republic of Ireland) Leo Fernandez	5–2	(Scotland) Steven Bennie

=== Round 2–4 ===
Round 2 Best of 9 frames
(England) Tom Ford	5
(Republic of Ireland) Joe Delaney	2
(England) Craig Butler	2
(Norway) Kurt Maflin	5
(England) Paul Wykes	3
(Scotland) Scott MacKenzie	5
(Wales) Ian Preece	0
(England) Chris Melling	5
(Northern Ireland) Jason Prince	4
(England) Adrian Gunnell	5
(Wales) Philip Williams	2
(England) Luke Simmonds	5
(Cyprus) Mehmet Husnu	5
(England) Luke Fisher	4
(England) Simon Bedford	1
(England) Adrian Rosa	5
(China) Liu Song	4
(Wales) Ryan Day	5
(England) Michael Rhodes	2
(Scotland) Martin Dziewialtowski	5
(Republic of Ireland) Colm Gilcreest	4
(Australia) Neil Robertson	5
(England) Jamie Cope	2
(China) Ding Junhui	5
(Wales) Paul Davies	3
(England) Paul Sweeny	5
(Scotland) Gary Thomson	5
(England) Stuart Mann	2
(Wales) Lee Walker	5
(England) Jason Ferguson	3
(England) Munraj Pal	2
(Republic of Ireland) Leo Fernandez	5

Round 3 Best of 9 frames
(England) Rod Lawler	5
(England) Tom Ford	4
(England) Jimmy Michie	5
(Norway) Kurt Maflin	4
(England) Mike Dunn	3
(Scotland) Scott MacKenzie	5
(England) Andy Hicks	1
(England) Chris Melling	5
(Belgium) Bjorn Haneveer	5
(England) Adrian Gunnell	1
(England) Shaun Murphy	5
(England) Luke Simmonds	0
(Northern Ireland) Patrick Wallace	5
(Cyprus) Mehmet Husnu	4
(England) Sean Storey	3
(England) Adrian Rosa	5
(England) Dave Finbow	w/d
(Wales) Ryan Day	w/o
(England) Nick Walker	5
(Scotland) Martin Dziewialtowski	3
(England) Alfie Burden	2
(Australia) Neil Robertson	5
(Wales) Darren Morgan	2
(China) Ding Junhui	5
(England) David Roe	5
(England) Paul Sweeny	4
(Scotland) Marcus Campbell	3
(Scotland) Gary Thomson	5
(England) Nick Dyson	4
(Wales) Lee Walker	5
(Pakistan) Shokat Ali	5
(Republic of Ireland) Leo Fernandez	4

Round 4 Best of 9 frames
(Republic of Ireland) Fergal O'Brien	4
(England) Rod Lawler	5
(England) Brian Morgan	4
(England) Jimmy Michie	5
(Thailand) James Wattana	3
(Scotland) Scott MacKenzie	5
(England) Stuart Bingham	5
(England) Chris Melling	4
(England) Mark Davis	5
(Belgium) Bjorn Haneveer	2
(Scotland) Stephen Maguire	2
(England) Shaun Murphy	5
(England) Nigel Bond	5
(Northern Ireland) Patrick Wallace	2
(England) Michael Holt	5
(England) Adrian Rosa	4
(Republic of Ireland) Michael Judge	2
(Wales) Ryan Day	5
(Scotland) Jamie Burnett	5
(England) Nick Walker	3
(England) Jonathan Birch	2
(Australia) Neil Robertson	5
(England) Barry Hawkins	2
(China) Ding Junhui	5
(England) Stuart Pettman	5
(England) David Roe	3
(England) Barry Pinches	5
(Scotland) Gary Thomson	3
(England) Gary Wilkinson	5
(Wales) Lee Walker	3
(Northern Ireland) Gerard Greene	5
(Pakistan) Shokat Ali	1

== Century breaks ==
=== Qualifying stage centuries ===
- 144, 102 – Stuart Bingham
- 144 – Garry Hardiman
- 137, 135, 100 – Ding Junhui
- 134 – Chris Melling
- 132, 115, 109 – Adrian Gunnell
- 126 – Lee Walker
- 125 – Mark King
- 125 – Neil Robertson
- 124 – Tom Ford
- 123 – Patrick Wallace
- 121 – Martin Dziewialtowski
- 120, 106 – Ryan Day
- 118 – Shaun Murphy
- 113 – Ali Carter
- 112, 104, 103 – Kurt Maflin
- 108 – Jamie Burnett
- 107 – Munraj Pal
- 106 – Barry Pinches
- 106 – Adrian Rosa
- 104 – Ian Preece
- 102 – Simon Bedford
- 102 – Mark Davis
- 101 – Michael Holt

=== Televised stage centuries ===
- 145 – Ken Doherty
- 144, 135, 121, 117, 110 – Paul Hunter
- 144 – Peter Ebdon
- 138 – Mark King
- 123 – John Higgins
- 122 – David Gray
- 121, 115, 104 – Jimmy White
- 120 – Ryan Day
- 112, 106 – Graeme Dott
- 107, 106, 103 – Ronnie O'Sullivan
- 106 – Stephen Lee
- 105, 102 – Rod Lawler
- 103, 101 – Ian McCulloch
- 103 – Stephen Hendry
- 102 – Alan McManus
- 102 – Stuart Bingham
- 100 – Joe Perry
