= Craig MacGillivray =

Craig MacGillivray may refer to:

- Craig MacGillivray (footballer) (born 1993), Scottish footballer
- Craig MacGillivray (snooker player) (born 1972), Scottish snooker player
