= Chris Scanlon =

English snooker player

Personal information
- Born: February 17, 1975 (age 51)

Sport
- Country: England
- Sport: Snooker
- Professional: 1992–2001
- Highest ranking: 64 (1997/1998)
- Best ranking finish: Quarter-final (x1)

Chris Scanlon (born 17 February 1975) is an English former professional snooker player.

== Career ==
Scanlon was born in 1975, and turned professional in 1992. His first season brought no significant progress, but in the 1993/1994 season, he reached the last 32 at the Dubai Classic, where he was defeated 5–0 by John Parrott.

Scanlon next played in the later stages of a ranking event at the 1995 Welsh Open, where he beat Steve Archer, Karl Broughton, Billy Snaddon, Terry Griffiths 5–0 and Jason Ferguson, setting up a last-16 meeting with Stephen Hendry, by this time a four-time World Champion. There, Scanlon was outclassed, losing 0–5 to the Scot.

The following season, Scanlon reached the last 32 at the 1996 European Open, defeating Suriya Suwannasingh 5–2, David Rippon 5–3, veteran Alex Higgins 5–4, Mark Flowerdew 5–3, Brian Morgan 5–3 and Frans Mintoff 5–1, but lost 3–5 to Parrott. The victory over Higgins was one of the latter's final matches as a professional.

Ranked within the top 64 for the 1997/1998 season - albeit as the world number 64 - Scanlon enjoyed the best performance of his career at the 1998 Scottish Open. There, he defeated Mark Gray, Joe Swail, Peter Lines and Mark Bennett, the latter two both 5–0 to reach the quarter-final. However, Scanlon was himself beaten 5–0 by Stephen Lee, scoring only seven points in the final three frames.

The next season saw Scanlon perform poorly in every tournament he entered apart from the 1999 World Championship. Having earned only £4,760 from ten events, Scanlon beat Darryn Walker 10–9, Shokat Ali 10–7 having trailed 4–7, and Paul Sweeny 10–5 from 4–5 behind, to set up a last-48 meeting with Fergal O'Brien. In their match, Scanlon held O'Brien to 5–5, but lost 7–10. As a result of this performance, and having earned a further £9,250 in prize money, Scanlon remained a professional despite being ranked outside the top 64.

However, Scanlon was unable to improve his form, the highlight of the 1999/2000 season being a run to the last 64 at the 1999 Grand Prix, where he lost 2–5 to Gary Wilkinson. After losing in qualifying for the 2000 World Championship 9–10 to David McLellan, Scanlon finished the season ranked 112th and did not play another competitive match. He was relegated from the tour a year later in 2001.
