= Jimmy Michie =

English snooker player

Personal information
- Born: 4 August 1971 (age 55) Pontefract

Sport
- Country: England
- Sport: Snooker
- Professional: 1991–2011
- Highest ranking: 46 (2008/2009)
- Best ranking finish: Semi-final (x2)

Jimmy Michie (pronounced "Mickey"; born 4 August 1971) is an English former professional snooker player from Pontefract, Yorkshire, and a two-time WPBSA ranking tournament semi-finalist, who has also reached the World Snooker Championship. Michie has been described as "charismatic" by the snooker press.

== Career ==
In the 2006/2007 season Michie was ranked only 61, for the first of two successive seasons, having failed to do better than the last-48 (third round) in ranking tournaments, although he did get that far twice that season. In the Northern Ireland Trophy, after having beaten Ben Woollaston and six-time World Champion runner-up Jimmy White, he lost 4–5 to James Wattana, and he fell in the Malta Cup to Stuart Bingham, 3–5.

Michie has placed as high as no. 55 twice, in both the 2002/2003 and 2004/2005 seasons.

His first ranking semi-final (fifth-round) performance was earned, at the 1999 British Open by defeating Tony Drago, Marcus Campbell, Ronnie O'Sullivan, and 1991 World Champion John Parrott, finally losing to Anthony Hamilton.

In the 2002 LG Cup, he beat Marco Fu and Mark King, and narrowly defeated quarter-finalist Gerard Greene 5–4 (after having been down 1–4 before dramatically rallying), to reach the semi-finals again. However, he lost 2–6 against the tournament's eventual winner, Chris Small.

His only World Snooker Championship entrance to date was in the 1996 event, in which he was bumped out in the first round, 8–10, by James Wattana. The World Snooker website reported that he "arrived in a stretch limo" at the Crucible, apparently excited at his first World title opportunity, "but made a low-key exit after losing".

In January 2011, he was involved in a controversial televised match against Marcus Campbell in the inaugural Snooker Shoot-Out. Campbell's price to win the match crashed on the betting exchanges pre-match and several bookmakers refused to take any bets on it altogether. The WPBSA issued a statement saying that they would carry out a full investigation.

The match against Campbell would prove to be Michie's last as a professional, as he retired shortly afterwards.

== Off the table ==
In 2002, Michie unsuccessfully offered a reward of £1,000 for the return of his cue, which had been stolen along with his car.

During the semi-final of the 2006 World Championship, Michie assisted Ronnie O'Sullivan by gluing a new tip on to O'Sullivan's cue, as O'Sullivan had persistent problems with his cue tip, helping O'Sullivan avoid a penalty during the Championships.

In early 2007 he was preparing for charity marathons to raise funds for the anti-cancer foundation that is the legacy of now-deceased fellow pro Paul Hunter.

In 2016 Jimmy Michie was jailed for 44 months for importation of unlicensed medication, handling stolen goods, money laundering. The drugs operations Jimmy was involved in were predominantly distributing viagra and diazepam.
