= David McLellan (snooker player) =

Scottish snooker player

Personal information
- Born: 10 January 1970 (age 56) Glasgow, Scotland

Sport
- Country: Scotland
- Sport: Snooker
- Professional: 1991–2001, 2002/2003
- Highest ranking: 75 (1996/1997)
- Maximum breaks: 1
- Best ranking finish: Last 32 (x3)

David McLellan (born 10 January 1970) is a Scottish former professional snooker player.

== Career ==
Born in 1970, McLellan turned professional alongside around three hundred other players in 1991. His first few seasons hailed no significant progress, although he enjoyed victories over Bob Chaperon in the 1991 Benson & Hedges Championship, and the veteran Rex Williams in qualifying for the 1994 World Championship.

McLellan reached his first quarter-final at Event 2 of the 1994 Minor Tour, where he defeated nineteen-year-old John Higgins 3–1, Drew Henry 3–0, Scott MacFarlane 3–1 and Robin Hull 5–2, before losing 3–5 to Jason Weston.

The following season at the 1996 International Open, he beat Jason Smith, Yasin Merchant, Steve Judd, Mark Johnston-Allen and Steve James, before losing 4–5 to compatriot Chris Small in the last 32. McLellan repeated this feat at the next year's edition of the tournament, defeated this time 5–0 by Peter Ebdon.

At the 1997 World Championship, McLellan won five matches to reach the main stages at the Crucible Theatre; he defeated Joe Jogia, Peter Lines and Tony Jones all 10–9, Nick Dyson 10–6 and Neal Foulds 10–9 to set up a meeting with the six-time World Champion Steve Davis in the last 32. In the event, Davis led 5–0, and prevailed 10–2.

After this success, McLellan's form slipped, and he did not progress beyond the last 64 of a ranking tournament again. However, in a match against Steve Meakin at the 2000 Benson & Hedges Championship, he compiled a 147 maximum break; McLellan beat Meakin 5–3 but lost in the last 64 to Sean Storey.

Having lost his professional status in 2001, McLellan entered tour qualifying events the following season to regain it; he was successful, but dropped off the tour once more at the end of the 2002/2003 season, leaving professional snooker at the age of 33.
