= Karl Burrows =

English snooker player

Personal information
- Born: 17 February 1969 (age 57)

Sport
- Sport: Snooker
- Professional: 1991–2001
- Highest ranking: 69 (1997–98)
- Maximum breaks: 1
- Best ranking finish: Last 16 (×2)

Karl Burrows (born 17 February 1969) is an English former professional snooker player.

== Career ==
Born in 1969, Burrows turned professional in 1991. His best run in a ranking tournament was reaching the last 16, which he achieved at both the 1996 Asian Classic, beating World Number 2 John Higgins 5-0 in the process, and the 1998 British Open. At the British Open tournament, he defeated 1986 world champion Joe Johnson before being whitewashed by reigning world champion Ken Doherty at the last 16 stage.

One of the most memorable moments of Burrows' career came when he recorded a maximum break against Adrian Rosa at the 1999 Benson & Hedges Championship, the 33rd official maximum break.
