= Craig MacGillivray (snooker player) =

Scottish snooker player

Personal information
- Born: 3 July 1972 (age 54)

Sport
- Country: Scotland
- Sport: Snooker
- Professional: 1991–2001
- Highest ranking: 85 (2000/2001)

Craig MacGillivray (born 3 July 1972) is a Scottish former professional snooker player. He competed on the main tour between 1991 and 2001, and was ranked 85th for the 2000/2001 season.

== Career ==
Born in 1972, MacGillivray turned professional in 1991. He reached the last 64 at the Grand Prix of that year, beating seven opponents including Rex Williams, but was eliminated 1–5 by Neal Foulds.

=== Professional (1991–2001) ===
MacGillivray recorded nine further last-64 finishes in the following decade, and progressed to the last 48 stage - a career-best - at the 1999 China International. There, he defeated Kristján Helgason, Gerard Greene and Paul Wykes, before losing 4–5 to fellow Scot Billy Snaddon. He came within one match of equalling this performance at that year's World Championship but, having overcome Munraj Pal 10–7 and Tony Chappel 10–8, lost 5–10 to Steve James.

Beginning the 2000/2001 season ranked 85th, MacGillivray endured a poor run of form thereafter, dropping fifty-two places to 137th by its conclusion and losing his professional status, aged 28.

=== Amateur (since 2001) ===
He attempted to regain his place on tour in the following few seasons, but was unsuccessful; in the fifth qualifying round of the 2004 World Championship, Mehmet Husnu ended MacGillivray's run of four successive victories, defeating him 10–2.

MacGillivray's next appearance in a competitive tournament came at the 2010 World Open, where he beat fellow amateur Jamie Edwards 3–1, but lost his last-96 match 0–3 to James Wattana. Having not entered the first four editions of the World Seniors Championship, he played in the 2015 event, beating Hassan Vaizie, 1978 UK Champion Patsy Fagan and Karl Townsend, but lost his next match 1–2 to Paul McPhillips.

During the 2015/2016 season, MacGillivray participated in the 2015 Six-red World Championship, but lost all five of his group matches - 1–5 to Yan Bingtao and Mark Davis, 2–5 to Soheil Vahedi and 3–5 to Noppon Saengkham and Stuart Bingham.

MacGillivray now works as a taxi driver in his native Edinburgh.
