= Nick Pearce =

English snooker player

Personal information
- Born: 25 January 1967 (age 59) London, England

Sport
- Country: England
- Sport: Snooker
- Professional: 1992–2003
- Highest ranking: 57 (1997/1998)
- Best ranking finish: Semi-final (x1)

Nicholas Pearce, known as Nick Pearce (born 25 January 1967) is an English former professional snooker player.

== Career ==
Pearce was born in 1967, and first attracted public attention at the age of sixteen when he appeared on Junior Pot Black in 1983, defeated by fourteen-year-old Stephen Hendry 70–23 in the quarter-finals.

Pearce turned professional in 1992, and won nine of his first eleven matches; however, the open nature of the tour at that time was such that these were played in his first two tournaments, and he reached only the last 96 at the 1992 Grand Prix. There, he faced veteran Welshman Cliff Wilson and made his first competitive century break, an effort of 100, but was defeated 4–5.

The following several years were barren, but in the 1995/1996 season, Pearce reached the last 48 at the 1995 Thailand Open, and the semi-final - a career-best - at the 1996 International Open. In the former, he defeated five opponents including Robin Hull, Tony Jones and the young Stephen Lee, before losing 3–5 to Joe Swail; in the latter, he beat Steven de Baets, Sean Storey, Robby Foldvari, Les Dodd, Mick Price, Jason Prince, David Roe and Dave Harold, setting up an encounter with Rod Lawler. Pearce led 4–2 and 5–3 in their match, but could not prevent a fightback from Lawler and a 5–6 loss to the eventual runner-up.

Having begun the season as the world number 204, Pearce's run to the semi-finals earned him £16,000; the other eight tournaments he had entered had heralded no prize money at all, but by its conclusion he had jumped 109 places to 95th.

The next season was more successful, as Pearce registered several last-64 finishes, reaching the last 32 at the 1997 British Open and the last 16 at the 1996 Grand Prix. At the Grand Prix, he notably beat Ronnie O'Sullivan 5–1 in their last-32 match, but lost his next 0–5 to the Canadian Alain Robidoux; in the British Open, he defeated Simon Morris, Jeff Cundy, Euan Henderson and Chris Small but was again whitewashed, this time losing 0–5 to Mark Williams. He finished the season at a career-high ranking of 57th.

Pearce's form dipped sharply thereafter, and he did not progress beyond the last 48 at a ranking event again. Having finished the 2002/2003 season ranked 113th, he was relegated from the tour, losing his professional status at the age of 36.

Pearce attempted to re-qualify during the following season, but entered only the first Challenge Tour event, losing 0–4 to Matthew Selt in the first round. He entered qualifying for the 2013 World Seniors Championship, but lost his first round match 1–2 to Darren Thompson.
