= Nick Dyson =

English snooker player

Personal information
- Born: 19 December 1969 (age 56)

Sport
- Country: England
- Sport: Snooker
- Professional: 1989–1997, 1999–2006
- Highest ranking: 44 (2005/2006)
- Maximum breaks: 2
- Best ranking finish: Last 16 (x1)

Nick Dyson (born 19 December 1969) is an English former professional snooker player. He competed on the main tour over sixteen seasons between 1989 and 2006.

== Career ==
Born in 1969, Dyson turned professional in 1989. In his first season on the main tour, he reached the last 16 at the 1990 European Open, where he defeated Ian Williamson, Steve Longworth, Dennis Taylor and Martin Clark and was drawn against the resurgent Colin Roscoe. In their match, Dyson led 2–1 but eventually lost 2–5.

At the 1991 World Championship, he beat Eddie Sinclair, Mark Rowing and Cliff Thorburn - becoming the first person to defeat Thorburn in a World Championship qualifying match - to reach the main stages at the Crucible Theatre for the first time. There, he played Jimmy White, who compiled three century breaks in winning 10–3.

Having never reached a ranking higher than 60th, Dyson fell off the tour in 1997, playing on the secondary UK Tour for the 1997/1998 season. His results there, and during the next season, were sufficient for him to return to the professional ranks in 1999.

In the 2000 Malta Grand Prix, Dyson beat Craig MacGillivray, Neal Foulds, John Read and Dave Harold to reach the last 32, but was selected to play in the wildcard round; drawn against Joe Grech, he made breaks of 96, 112, 107 and 108 but lost 4–5.

Dyson qualified for the 2001 World Championship, making his first appearance at the Crucible in ten years, by beating Ian Brumby, Mark Gray, Steve James, Rod Lawler and Brian Morgan. He played Ken Doherty in the last 32, but lost 7–10.

Earlier in the 2000/2001 season, he had compiled his second 147 maximum break in professional competition, against Robert Milkins in the UK Championship. Dyson progressed to the last 32 at that tournament, overcoming White 9–6 in the last 48, before losing 2–9 to Fergal O'Brien. He had made his first maximum in a UK Tour event in 1999.

Following a 6–10 loss to Matthew Couch in qualifying for the 2006 World Championship, Dyson finished the 2005/2006 season ranked 87th; as only the top 64 automatically retained their places, he was relegated from the tour in the summer of 2006.

== Career finals ==
=== Non-ranking finals: 1 (1 title) ===
- Merseyside Professional Championship – 2001
