= Munraj Pal =

English snooker player

Personal information
- Born: 21 April 1976 (age 50) Derby, England

Sport
- Country: England
- Sport: Snooker
- Professional: 1995–1997, 1998–2001, 2002–2004, 2007/2008
- Highest ranking: 85 (2004/2005)

Munraj Pal (born 21 April 1976) is an English former professional snooker player.

== Career ==
Pal turned professional in 1995, but fell off the tour two years later in 1997. He re-qualified during the 1997/1998 season, but lost his professional status again in 2001; forced once more to enter qualifying tournaments in the 2001/2002 season, he competed on the tour for a third stint between 2002 and 2004. At this point, although he had reached his highest-ever ranking of 85th, Pal was relegated again.

He got back onto the professional tour in 2007/2008 by finishing fifth on the Pontin's International Open Series Order of Merit, winning one PIOS event in 2006.

He reached the last 48 at the 2001 Scottish Open – where he lost 1–5 to James Wattana.

== Career finals ==
Pal completed two finals in his career, both in the International Open Series.

=== Non-ranking finals: 1 ===
Outcome	Year	Championship	Opponent in the final	Score
Runner-up	2002	WPBSA Open Tour – Event 4	(England) Matthew Couch	3–5

=== Amateur finals: 1 (1 title) ===
Outcome	Year	Championship	Opponent in the final	Score
Winner	2006	PIOS – Event 1	(Norway) Kurt Maflin	6–3
