= 2004 British Open =

Tournament information
- Dates: 8–14 November 2004
- Venue: Brighton Centre
- City: Brighton
- Country: England
- Organisation: WPBSA
- Format: Ranking event
- Total prize fund: £200,000
- Winner's share: £30,000
- Highest break: John Higgins (SCO) (144)

Final
- Champion: John Higgins (SCO)
- Runner-up: Stephen Maguire (SCO)
- Score: 9–6

The 2004 British Open was the 2004 edition of the British Open snooker tournament, held from 8 to 14 November 2004 at Brighton Centre, Brighton, England. John Higgins won the tournament, defeating Stephen Maguire nine frames to six in the all-Scottish final to lift his first ranking-event title since the 2001 edition of this event. In the semi-finals, Higgins defeated Shaun Murphy 6–0 and Maguire defeated Ronnie O'Sullivan 6–1. The defending champion Stephen Hendry lost in the quarter-finals. Higgins made the highest tournament break with his two breaks of 144. The tournament was the second of eight WPBSA ranking events in the 2004/2005 snooker season, following the Grand Prix in October, which was won by O'Sullivan. It preceded the third ranking event of the season, the UK Championship.

== Tournament summary ==
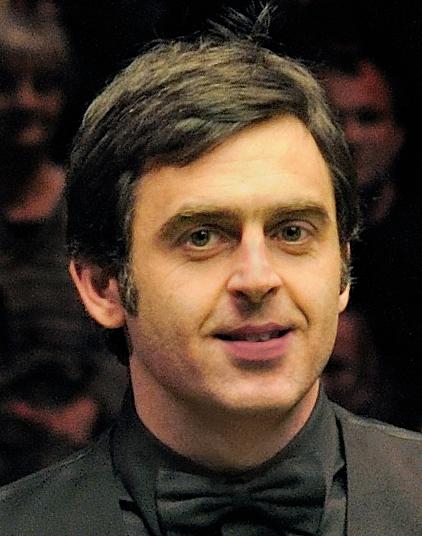
Ronnie O'Sullivan, the world number one and world champion

The 2004 British Open was the second ranking event of the 2004/2005 snooker season, after the Grand Prix in October, which was won by world number one Ronnie O'Sullivan—the 2004 and two-time world champion—who defeated Ian McCulloch 9–5 in the final. It preceded the UK Championship.

The defending champion was seven-time world champion Stephen Hendry who defeated O'Sullivan 9–6 in last year's final. Hendry was still angry at his loss at the Grand Prix to McCulloch, explaining, "The way I felt at the Grand Prix was down to the fact that I know what I'm still capable of". The total prize fund was £200,000 and the host broadcaster was Eurosport. O'Sullivan was considered the favourite, with his mentor Ray Reardon saying "Ronnie is in the form of his life and looks very close to being unstoppable at the moment". Although few top players reached the final eight in the Grand Prix, O'Sullivan said he would not be surprised if they performed well in this tournament.

=== Qualifying ===
The qualifying rounds were played between players ranked lower than 32 for one of 16 places in the final stage, at Pontin's Snooker Centre, Prestatyn, Wales. The matches were best-of-9 frames until the semi-finals. Highly regarded 17-year-old Chinese player Ding Junhui, in his professional first season, won his sixth consecutive match when he beat Robin Hull 5–2. The other successful qualifiers included the likes of Shaun Murphy, Mark Selby, Neil Robertson, and Ryan Day.

=== Round 1 ===
The 16 first-round matches were between players ranked 17–32 and those who had made it through the qualifying stage. In this round, Ding took 63 minutes to whitewash 5–0 Malta's Tony Drago—who turned professional before Ding was born—outscoring Drago 463–73, for his first appearance in the last 32 of a ranking tournament. European Open winner Stephen Maguire defeated Australian Robertson 5–3, while world number 48 Murphy beat McCulloch 5–2. Michael Holt, in his first season in the top 32, beat Dave Harold 5–2, and Mark King defeated Selby by the same scoreline. Ali Carter whitewashed Belgian's number one Bjorn Haneveer 5–0 in 76 minutes, while Barry Hawkins prevailed 5–4 over Joe Perry, despite the latter making the highest break so far with a 133. John Parrott made a century break in his 5–3 victory over Jamie Burnett, while Joe Jogia won four consecutive frames to overcome Joe Swail 5–4.

=== Round 2 ===
The winners of round 1 went through to face members of the top 16. Ding continued his run, defeating Jimmy White 5–1 to make the last 16 of a ranking event for the first time. Ding called the win his most satisfying to date and White commended his opponent's performance, saying, "He's dangerous and he's improved a hell of a lot this year". Elsewhere, Maguire whitewashed UK champion Matthew Stevens 5–0, outscoring him 427–68. O'Sullivan extended his unbeaten run to 12 matches when he defeated Parrott 5–2, in a match that lasted two hours and 28 minutes and which featured a lot of tactical, disjointed exchanges. He was not satisfied with his performance, however: "I was awful—if I keep playing like that they'll have to call the nuthouse to come and collect me". 1997 world champion Ken Doherty, who was ranked seventh but had slipped to fifteenth in the provisional rankings, defeated Quinten Hann 5–1, after Hann had smashed the red balls from his break-off shot at 0–4 down, from which he fluked a red and made an 89 break. John Higgins, a three-time champion who first won in 1995, beat Drew Henry 5–1, and said he would withdraw from the tournament if his pregnant wife went into labour. Hendry beat Robert Milkins 5–1, and dismissed suggestions that the loss at the Grand Prix had inspired him to play better at this tournament. Murphy defeated world number four Paul Hunter 5–3 for his second last-16 appearance in a ranking event, and attributed the win to his happiness off the table; Murphy—a Christian since the age of 17—said, "My girlfriend Claire is a wonderful woman. We've become engaged and we're involved with a tremendous church in Rotherham". Two-time world champion and world number two Mark Williams—who became a father in May and had slipped to eighth in the provisional rankings—claimed a 5–1 victory over Jogia in 89 minutes. In a hard-fought contest, Stephen Lee defeated King 5–4. The other winners were Carter, Andy Hicks, Anthony Hamilton, Hawkins, Barry Pinches, Holt, and Stuart Bingham.

=== Round 3 ===
In the last 16, O'Sullivan compiled two century breaks to whitewash Lee 5–0 for his 13th consecutive win and his 9th consecutive quarter-final. Regarding comments he made about his retirement after his previous match, O'Sullivan said, "There's no point quoting me because what I say from one day to the next will be different". Maguire made a total clearance of 140 in his 5–2 win over Ding, while Hamilton defeated Williams 5–3 for his fourth consecutive win over the world number two. Hendry, whose last tournament victory was this event last year, made four breaks over 60 in his 5–2 win over Carter to set up a match with Higgins, who made the highest break so far with a 141 in his 5–3 win over Pinches. Doherty became the fifth member of the top eight to lose when he was defeated 4–5 by Hicks, while Hawkins defeated Bingham 5–4 and Murphy beat Holt 5–3.

=== Quarter-finals ===
In the quarter-finals, O'Sullivan defeated Hicks 5–1 in a match in which Hicks made a few errors. After the match, O'Sullivan attributed his success to his mentor Reardon. Maguire made three consecutive century breaks from 2–0 up to whitewash Hamilton 5–0, setting up a semi-final clash with O'Sullivan. Maguire won the first two frames on the black, the second after trailing 0–74 and requiring two snookers. Maguire said that he played brilliant, like in practice, and Hamilton said his opponent was a "proper talent". Higgins defeated Hendry 5–2 in a low-quality match in which Higgins won the first three frames with a high break of 30. Hendry won the next two with breaks of 66 and 58, but Higgins closed the match with breaks of 85 and 79. Higgins said he was willing to risk a possible fine by attending to his wife if she gave birth. Murphy beat fellow qualifier Hawkins 5–3 to reach his first ranking semi-final, with Higgins as the opponent.

=== Semi-finals ===
In the semi-finals, now best-of-11, Higgins took 73 minutes to whitewash Murphy 6–0, scoring breaks of 58, 114, 57, 89, and completing the victory with a total clearance of 144, the highest break so far. The time of 73 minutes was only two minutes slower than the quickest best-of-11 match—the semi-finals of the 1993 International Open between Hendry and Dave Harold—and Higgins outscored Murphy 566–72. In the first three frames, Murphy managed to score a total of 10 points. In the fourth, Murphy broke down on a break of 50 before Higgins fluked a yellow, enabling him to make a 57 break. He then fortuitously snooked Murphy on the pink, which Higgins potted to make it 4–0. An 89 break extended Higgins' lead, before he finished the match with a 144 break. Higgins attributed his performance to a shortening of his cue.

In the other semi-final, Maguire ended O'Sullivan's 14-match unbeaten run with a 6–1 victory to earn a place in the final against Higgins. Maguire made century breaks in the first two frames, becoming the first player to make five consecutive century breaks (including the three made in his previous match). Maguire won the third on the pink after O'Sullivan missed the yellow. O'Sullivan won the next with a break of 51, before Maguire made a break of 71 in each of the final two frames. After the match, O'Sullivan—who had won all three previous encounters against Maguire—said, "I've never seen anything like that on a snooker table before ... He's a great player, probably the best in the world at the moment", and even before the match, O'Sullivan had described Maguire as "of the young ones, definitely the best". The defeat meant that Reardon lost the £100 bet he placed at 150–1 that O'Sullivan would win all eight of the season's ranking events.

=== Final ===
In the all-Scottish best-of-17 final, Higgins defeated Maguire 9–6 for a record-equalling fourth title. Of the victory, Higgins said it was the most important of his career. He had not won a ranking title since his 2001 victory at this event and had lost his previous six finals. It was his 25th major title and his 16th ranking title, and it earned him £30,000 in prize money.

In the afternoon session, Maguire took the first frame, but Higgins won the next three, compiling a 100 break in the third. Breaks of 72, 55, and 76 allowed Maguire to regain the lead, before Higgins took the eighth after Maguire missed a straightforward red to leave it 4–4 at the end of the first session. In the evening session, Higgins took the ninth, before Maguire made two breaks over 50 in the 10th. Higgins then made two consecutive century breaks, including a 144 in the 11th, which equalled his own highest break. He continued his run with a break of 68 in the 13th, before Maguire pulled one back in the next. A 97 break gave Higgins the victory.

All tournament, Higgins had been anticipating the birth of his child and on 24 November, Higgins became a father for the second time when his wife gave birth to a son, Oliver, shortly after his loss at the UK Championship.

== Prize fund ==
The breakdown of prize money for this year is shown below:

- Winner: £30,000
- Runner-up: £15,000
- Semi-final: £7,500
- Quarter-final: £5,600
- Last 16: £4,000
- Last 32: £2,500
- Last 48: £1,625
- Last 64: £1,100
- Highest break: £2,000
- Maximum break: £20,000
- Total: £200,000

== Main draw ==
Numbers to the left of the players are the tournament seedings. Players in bold are the match winners.

Last 48; Best of 9 frames
28 | **Robert Milkins** (ENG) | **5**
52 | David Roe (ENG) | 3
19 | **Ali Carter** (ENG) | **5**
53 | Bjorn Haneveer (BEL) | 0
21 | **Barry Pinches** (ENG) | **5**
35 | Nigel Bond (ENG) | 2
27 | **Drew Henry** (SCO) | **5**
40 | Mark Davis (ENG) | 4
20 | Joe Perry (ENG) | 4
43 | **Barry Hawkins** (ENG) | **5**
26 | Gerard Greene (NIR) | 1
37 | **Stuart Bingham** (ENG) | **5**
29 | **Michael Holt** (ENG) | **5**
34 | Dave Harold (ENG) | 2
17 | Ian McCulloch (ENG) | 2
48 | **Shaun Murphy** (ENG) | **5**
30 | Joe Swail (NIR) | 4
**Joe Jogia** (ENG) | 5
25 | **Anthony Hamilton** (ENG) | **5**
58 | Mike Dunn (ENG) | 1
22 | Tony Drago (MLT) | 0
76 | **Ding Junhui** (CHN) | **5**
24 | **Stephen Maguire** (SCO) | **5**
68 | Neil Robertson (AUS) | 3
18 | **Quinten Hann** (AUS) | **5**
45 | Ryan Day (WAL) | 3
32 | Dominic Dale (WAL) | 0
50 | **Andy Hicks** (ENG) | **5**
23 | **Mark King** (ENG) | **5**
36 | Mark Selby (ENG) | 2
31 | **John Parrott** (ENG) | **5**
49 | Jamie Burnett (SCO) | 3

Last 32; Best of 9 frames
1 | **Stephen Hendry** (SCO) | **5**
28 | Robert Milkins (ENG) | 1
10 | Alan McManus (SCO) | 2
19 | **Ali Carter** (ENG) | **5**
14 | David Gray (ENG) | 3
21 | **Barry Pinches** (ENG) | **5**
5 | **John Higgins** (SCO) | **5**
27 | Drew Henry (SCO) | 1
8 | Peter Ebdon (ENG) | 3
43 | **Barry Hawkins** (ENG) | **5**
13 | Steve Davis (ENG) | 4
37 | **Stuart Bingham** (ENG) | **5**
15 | Graeme Dott (SCO) | 1
29 | **Michael Holt** (ENG) | **5**
4 | Paul Hunter (ENG) | 3
48 | **Shaun Murphy** (ENG) | **5**
3 | **Mark Williams** (WAL) | **5**
Joe Jogia (ENG) | 1
12 | Chris Small (SCO) | 2
25 | **Anthony Hamilton** (ENG) | **5**
11 | Jimmy White (ENG) | 1
76 | **Ding Junhui** (CHN) | **5**
6 | Matthew Stevens (WAL) | 0
24 | **Stephen Maguire** (SCO) | **5**
7 | **Ken Doherty** (IRL) | **5**
18 | Quinten Hann (AUS) | 1
16 | Marco Fu (HKG) | 2
50 | **Andy Hicks** (ENG) | **5**
9 | **Stephen Lee** (ENG) | **5**
23 | Mark King (ENG) | 4
2 | **Ronnie O'Sullivan** (ENG) | **5**
31 | John Parrott (ENG) | 2

Last 16; Best of 9 frames
1 | **Stephen Hendry** (SCO) | **5**
19 | Ali Carter (ENG) | 4
21 | Barry Pinches (ENG) | 3
5 | **John Higgins** (SCO) | **5**
43 | **Barry Hawkins** (ENG) | **5**
37 | Stuart Bingham (ENG) | 4
29 | Michael Holt (ENG) | 3
48 | **Shaun Murphy** (ENG) | **5**
3 | Mark Williams (WAL) | 3
25 | **Anthony Hamilton** (ENG) | **5**
76 | Ding Junhui (CHN) | 2
24 | **Stephen Maguire** (SCO) | **5**
7 | Ken Doherty (IRL) | 4
50 | **Andy Hicks** (ENG) | **5**
9 | Stephen Lee (ENG) | 0
2 | **Ronnie O'Sullivan** (ENG) | **5**

Quarter-finals; Best of 9 frames
1 | Stephen Hendry (SCO) | 2
5 | **John Higgins** (SCO) | **5**
43 | Barry Hawkins (ENG) | 3
48 | **Shaun Murphy** (ENG) | **5**
25 | Anthony Hamilton (ENG) | 0
24 | **Stephen Maguire** (SCO) | **5**
50 | Andy Hicks (ENG) | 1
2 | **Ronnie O'Sullivan** (ENG) | **5**

Semi-finals; Best of 11 frames
5 | **John Higgins** (SCO) | **6**
48 | Shaun Murphy (ENG) | 0
24 | **Stephen Maguire** (SCO) | **6**
2 | Ronnie O'Sullivan (ENG) | 1

Final; Best of 17 frames
5 | **John Higgins** (SCO) | **9**
24 | Stephen Maguire (SCO) | 6

== Final ==
The bold text denotes winning frame scores and the winning finalist.

Final: Best of 17 frames. Referee: Jan Verhaas. The Brighton Centre, Brighton, England. 14 November 2004.
| **John Higgins** (5); Scotland | **9**–6 | Stephen Maguire (24); Scotland |
Afternoon: 39–**81** (77), **61**–26, **100**–29 (100), **79**–1, 0–**72** (72), 17–**95** (55), 20–**91** (76), **72**–19 (53); Evening: **64**–10, 13–**110** (56, 54), **144**–0 (144), **107**–0 (107), **74**–50 (68), 1–**93** (50), **104**–0 (97)
| **144** | Highest break | 77 |
| **3** | Century breaks | 0 |
| 6 | 50+ breaks | **7** |

== Qualifying ==
Qualifying for the tournament took place between 2 and 4 November 2004 at Pontins in Prestatyn, Wales. Players in bold indicate match winners.

Round 1 Best of 9 frames
Andrew Norman (ENG) | 4
**Hugh Abernethy** (SCO) | **5**
Darren Morgan (WAL) | 4
**Adam Davies** (ENG) | **5**
**Rory McLeod** (ENG) | **w/o**
Mark Gray (ENG) | w/d
**Alfie Burden** (ENG) | **w/o**
Steve James (ENG) | w/d
**Tom Ford** (ENG) | **5**
Sean O'Neill (NIR) | 4
**Paul Davies** (WAL) | **5**
Mike Hallett (ENG) | 3
**Shokat Ali** (PAK) | **5**
Gary Wilson (ENG) | 2
Ricky Walden (ENG) | 4
**Paul Davison** (ENG) | **5**
Craig Butler (ENG) | 2
**Joe Jogia** (ENG) | **5**
Paul Wykes (ENG) | 4
**Ben Woollaston** (ENG) | **5**
**Ding Junhui** (CHN) | **5**
Jin Long (CHN) | 3
Leo Fernandez (IRL) | 2
**David McDonnell** (IRL) | **5**
Stefan Mazrocis (NED) | 4
**Liu Song** (CHN) | **5**
**Simon Bedford** (ENG) | **5**
David Hall (ENG) | 0
**Joe Delaney** (IRL) | **5**
Brian Salmon (ENG) | 3
**Scott MacKenzie** (SCO) | **5**
Rodney Goggins (IRL) | 3

Round 2 Best of 9 frames
**David Roe** (ENG) | **5**
Hugh Abernethy (SCO) | 3
**Bjorn Haneveer** (BEL) | **5**
Adam Davies (ENG) | 1
**Sean Storey** (ENG) | **5**
Rory McLeod (ENG) | 3
**Marcus Campbell** (SCO) | **5**
**Alfie Burden** (ENG) | 3
Jonathan Birch (ENG) | 0
**Tom Ford** (ENG) | **5**
Anthony Davies (WAL) | 3
**Paul Davies** (WAL) | **5**
**Rod Lawler** (ENG) | **5**
Shokat Ali (PAK) | 1
**Adrian Gunnell** (ENG) | **5**
Paul Davison (ENG) | 3
Lee Walker (WAL) | 0
**Joe Jogia** (ENG) | **5**
**Mike Dunn** (ENG) | **5**
Ben Woollaston (ENG) | 2
Jimmy Michie (ENG) | 2
**Ding Junhui** (CHN) | **5**
**Neil Robertson** (AUS) | **5**
David McDonnell (IRL) | 2
**Nick Walker** (ENG) | **5**
Liu Song (CHN) | 3
**Andy Hicks** (ENG) | **5**
Simon Bedford (ENG) | 1
Gary Wilkinson (ENG) | 3
**Joe Delaney** (IRL) | **5**
Jamie Burnett (SCO) | **5**
Scott MacKenzie (SCO) | 4

Round 3 Best of 9 frames
Michael Judge (IRL) | 3
**David Roe** (ENG) | **5**
Patrick Wallace (NIR) | 4
**Bjorn Haneveer** (BEL) | **5**
**Nigel Bond** (ENG) | **5**
Sean Storey (ENG) | 1
**Mark Davis** (ENG) | **5**
Marcus Campbell (SCO) | 1
**Barry Hawkins** (ENG) | **5**
Tom Ford (ENG) | 0
**Stuart Bingham** (ENG) | **5**
Paul Davies (WAL) | 4
**Dave Harold** (ENG) | **5**
Rod Lawler (ENG) | 1
**Shaun Murphy** (ENG) | **5**
Adrian Gunnell (ENG) | 0
Stuart Pettman (ENG) | 3
**Joe Jogia** (ENG) | **5**
Fergal O'Brien (IRL) | 2
**Mike Dunn** (ENG) | **5**
Robin Hull (FIN) | 2
**Ding Junhui** (CHN) | **5**
Brian Morgan (ENG) | 2
**Neil Robertson** (AUS) | **5**
**Ryan Day** (WAL) | **5**
Nick Walker (ENG) | 1
James Wattana (THA) | 3
**Andy Hicks** (ENG) | **5**
**Mark Selby** (ENG) | **5**
Joe Delaney (IRL) | 2
Nick Dyson (ENG) | 4
**Jamie Burnett** (SCO) | **5**

== Century breaks ==
=== Qualifying stage centuries ===
A total of 13 players compiled a total of 14 century breaks during the qualifying stages of the 2004 British Open.

- 141 – Tom Ford
- 137 – Dave Harold
- 125 – Liu Song
- 124 – Stefan Mazrocis
- 117 – Jamie Burnett
- 116 – Craig Butler
- 113 – Darren Morgan
- 109 – Ryan Day
- 108, 102 – Ding Junhui
- 108 – Leo Fernandez
- 105 – Shokat Ali
- 103 – Adrian Gunnell
- 101 – Bjorn Haneveer

=== Televised stage centuries ===
There were 33 century breaks compiled by 17 different players during the course of the main rounds of the 2004 British Open.

- 144, 144, 141, 116, 114, 112, 107, 100 – John Higgins
- 140, 134, 113, 104, 101, 100 – Stephen Maguire
- 134, 103 – Andy Hicks
- 133 – Barry Pinches
- 133 – Joe Perry
- 129, 115 – Stuart Bingham
- 129 – Ken Doherty
- 127, 100 – Ronnie O'Sullivan
- 121 – Michael Holt
- 115 – Shaun Murphy
- 104, 103 – Barry Hawkins
- 104 – Ian McCulloch
- 104 – Ding Junhui
- 103 – Mark Williams
- 101 – John Parrott
- 100 – Neil Robertson
- 100 – Stephen Hendry
