= 2004 Grand Prix (snooker) =

Totesport Grand Prix
Tournament information
- Dates: 2–10 October 2004
- Venue: Guild Hall
- City: Preston
- Country: England
- Organisation: WPBSA
- Format: Ranking event
- Total prize fund: £400,000
- Winner's share: £60,000
- Highest break: John Higgins (SCO) (147)

Final
- Champion: Ronnie O'Sullivan (ENG)
- Runner-up: Ian McCulloch (ENG)
- Score: 9–5

The 2004 Snooker Grand Prix (known as the 2004 Totesport Grand Prix for sponsorship reasons) was the 2004 edition of the Grand Prix snooker tournament and was held from 2 to 10 October 2004 at the Guild Hall in Preston, England. World number one Ronnie O'Sullivan won the tournament defeating Ian McCulloch by nine frames to five (9–5) in the final. In the semi-finals O'Sullivan defeated Paul Hunter 6–3 and McCulloch beat Michael Judge 6–1. Mark Williams, who won the same event under the name LG Cup the year before, lost in the first round. John Higgins made the highest break with a 147. The 64-man tournament was the first of eight World Professional Billiards and Snooker Association (WPBSA) ranking events in the 2004/2005 snooker season and the next event following last season's World Championship, which was won by O'Sullivan. It preceded the second ranking event of the season, the British Open.

== Tournament summary ==
The tournament was created as the Professional Players Tournament in 1982 by the snooker governing body, the World Professional Billiards and Snooker Association (WPBSA), to provide another ranking event. It was renamed the Grand Prix for the 1984 event until 2001, when it was called the LG Cup, before reverting to the Grand Prix this year. The tournament was the first of eight WPBSA ranking events in the 2004/2005 snooker season, and the next event following last season's World Championship, which was won by Ronnie O'Sullivan, now a two-time world champion and the world number one. Mark Williams won the same event under the name LG Cup last year. The tournament preceded the second ranking event of the season, the British Open. Sponsored by totesport for the first time after signing a one-year contract announced the day before the event started, it had a prize fund of £400,000 and was broadcast on the BBC and Eurosport.

=== Qualifying ===
The qualifying rounds were played between players on the main tour ranked 33 and lower for one of 32 places in the final stage at Pontin's Snooker Centre in Prestatyn, Wales. The matches were best-of-9 frames until the semi-finals. Highly regarded 17-year-old Chinese player Ding Junhui narrowly missed out in qualifying. The other successful qualifiers included the likes of Mark Selby, Barry Hawkins, Shaun Murphy and Neil Robertson.

=== Round one ===
In round one the 32 qualifiers faced members of the top 32, including the top 16 seeds. In this round O'Sullivan defeated Mark Davis 5–2, compiling a century break of 114. After the match O'Sullivan praised his mentor Ray Reardon. World number 51 Andy Hicks won against the UK champion Matthew Stevens 5–1, compiling two century breaks and three half-centuries in the 72-minute match. After struggling early on, 1997 world champion Ken Doherty went through by beating Anthony Davies 5–1. Dominic Dale, the 1997 winner, made breaks of 108, 68, 61 and 58 in defeating Scott MacKenzie 5–1. David Gray whitewashed Lee Walker 5–0, while Joe Perry beat Pakistan's Shokat Ali 5–1. James Wattana lost a frame after three consecutive misses from an unsnookered position, but still defeated John Parrott 5–2, a match in which Parrott's highest break was 32.

Six-time world champion Steve Davis, the oldest player on the tour at 47, defeated Sean Storey 5–1, after which he said "At the start I couldn't hit the side of a bus station, but Sean let me off and in the end I didn't play badly." Seven-time world champion Stephen Hendry prevailed 5–4 over Jamie Burnett in a narrowly fought contest. Burnett, the world number 49, was 4–3 ahead and had potted the final red, but he missed the black, however, and Hendry forced a deciding frame which he won. After the match, Hendry said "I got out of jail". Breaks of 75, 61 and 56 enabled 2002 world champion Peter Ebdon to claim a 5–2 victory over Simon Bedford. Chinese player Jin Long, in his first appearance in the final stage of a ranking event, led Tony Drago 3–0 before Drago won five consecutive frames. Nigel Bond defeated Gerard Greene 5–2, while Anthony Hamilton overcame Jimmy Michie by the same scoreline. Marco Fu, a former Grand Prix runner-up, claimed a 5–2 victory over David Roe. After coming back from 3–4 down to beat Patrick Wallace 5–4, Jimmy White revealed he nearly withdrew from the tournament because of a back injury he sustained in a charity pool match the week before the tournament.

Williams, the world number two, was the highest ranked player to lose in the round when he lost 2–5 against Michael Judge. In the fifth frame, at 2–2, Williams was 64–0 ahead but a black ball clearance of 70 gave Judge the lead, who went on to win the match. After the match, Williams said that he was nowhere near the player he was a year ago. World number four and Masters champion Paul Hunter made breaks of 108 and 127 in defeating Darren Morgan 5–3. European Open winner Stephen Maguire defeated Murphy 5–2, a match in which Maguire had a frame docked. As the match was about to begin and after they had shaken hands, Maguire realised he had not brought his chalk with him. He asked referee Johan Oomen for permission to retrieve it, which was granted. As Maguire was away, Murphy spoke to the referee and questioned whether Maguire should be docked a frame, as he was technically not ready to play at the scheduled time. Mike Ganley, the tournament director, was called and docked a frame from Maguire, a ruling which angered Maguire. Of the incident Maguire said "Rules are rules but I've never heard of anything like that happening before." The incident was said to be a key point in the rivalry between Maguire and Murphy.

John Higgins made the highest break in the tournament with a maximum break in his 3–5 loss to Ricky Walden. It was his fifth maximum and the 49th in snooker history. It also earned him a bonus of £20,000. For Walden it was the second time he reached the second round of a ranking event. In a match in which the deciding frame lasted 64 minutes and ended past midnight, Alan McManus overcame Fergal O'Brien 5–4. Graeme Dott, the surprise runner-up at the World Championship, emerged a 5–4 winner over Ryan Day. Of the other seeded players, Chris Small lost 4–5 to Selby, Stephen Lee beat Hugh Abernethy 5–2 and Quinten Hann lost 3–5 against Marcus Campbell.

=== Round two ===
Davis became the first player through to the last 16 when he defeated Drago 5–1, after which he expressed his surprise he was still in the tournament. O'Sullivan overcame a chest infection to beat Joe Swail 5–1, but missed his post-match press conference. Hunter came from 2–4 down with a score of 0–39 in the seventh to beat Ali Carter, compiling a century break in the decider. Preston's Ian McCulloch beat White 5–4 with a break of 73 in the deciding frame. After beating Robert Milkins 5–3, Hendry expressed dissatisfaction with his performance. Maguire, the Snooker Writers' Association Young Player of the Year, saw off Walden 5–3 and said of the chalk incident "I made sure I had it this time." In the match between Fu and Hawkins Fu led 4–2, before Hawkins forced a deciding frame, which Fu won. Judge continued his run by defeating Campbell 5–4 with breaks of 76, 61, and 52, and said his victory over Williams had given him confidence. Although he fluked the final brown from a snooker, Wattana potted the blue and pink balls in the final frame of his match against Doherty to win 5–3. Doherty said "It was a cruel blow. ... I had James in a really good snooker and from where I was sat it did not even look as though he could hit it." Of the other seeds, Lee enjoyed a 5–1 victory over Hamilton, Dott defeated Dale 5–2, Ebdon beat Joe Jogia 5–4, Perry beat David Gray 5–3 and McManus lost 4–5 against Nigel Bond. The other non-seeded victors were Selby and Australian Robertson.

=== Round three ===
In the third round Dott failed to comeback from his loss in the final of the World Championship, as he was defeated 3–5 by O'Sullivan. After beating Davis 5–1, Hunter said he wished Davis would speed up his play. In the match Hunter made his fourth century break of the tournament and had breaks of 71, 66, 43, and 53. Hendry was defeated 3–5 by McCulloch by losing five of the last six frames, and said he was not the player he was. His break of 67 in the last frame was eclipsed by McCulloch's 72, who also made a break of 105 in the match. Breaks of 133 and 103 plus further runs of 41, 70, and 87 enabled Perry to beat Robertson 5–3 from 1–3 down. Selby saw off Ebdon 5–3 and said "Hopefully there's more to come." Maguire defeated Bond 5–1, while Wattana beat Lee and Judge beat Fu by the same scoreline.

=== Quarter-finals ===
In the quarter-finals O'Sullivan took 71 minutes to whitewash Selby 5–0, compiling two breaks of 135 and outscoring Selby 522–46. After the match O'Sullivan said "My safety was good, so was my thinking, and so was my break-building. It's as well as I have played in the tournament." Another whitewash occurred when Wattana was defeated 0–5 by Hunter, a match eight minutes longer than O'Sullivan's, whom he would face in the semi-finals. After the match Hunter said "I was racing Ronnie. I could see from the scoreboard that he was 3–0 up when I was leading 2–0."

In the other quarter-finals McCulloch defeated Maguire 5–2 after an error from Maguire, when he missed the pink for a probable 2–0 lead. The match included a 137 clearance from McCulloch. After the match Maguire said "I went for a crazy one and paid the price but I think today I was just a bit too cocky. I didn't believe I was going to lose." Judge beat Perry 5–1 to face McCulloch in his first ranking event semi-final, and became the fourth Irish player to achieve this feat after Eugene Hughes, Doherty and Fergal O'Brien.

=== Semi-finals ===
In the semi-final, now best-of-11 frames, O'Sullivan defeated Hunter 6–3. O'Sullivan started strongly and opened up a lead of 3–1 at the mid-session interval. Hunter closed the gap to 2–3, before O'Sullivan won the sixth frame. A break of 80 from Hunter followed, before O'Sullivan won the next two for the match, compiling a 107 in the final frame.

The other semi-final saw McCulloch beat Judge 6–1, a match in which Judge's highest break was 44 early in the game. McCulloch achieved runs of 132 and 89 after Judge hit a kick shot on a red ball that went away from its projected path on his way to victory. After his defeat Judge said he was happy with his form during the tournament.

=== Final ===
In the best-of-17 frame final O'Sullivan defeated McCulloch 9–5 to win his second consecutive ranking title. It was his 21st ranking final and 16th ranking title, which meant he was now third on the list ahead of Williams and Higgins. The victory earned him £60,000 and meant he had won all the ranking events on the calendar at least once. After the match O'Sullivan said he could still improve: "I have set myself high standards and I don't think I was firing on any cylinders." McCulloch said he was sure he would win a ranking title: "I have lost two finals now but I will win one—it is just a matter of when."

In the first session of the final O'Sullivan won the first frame with a break of 86. The next two frames were shared, before O'Sullivan made a century, which he followed with a 72 in the frame after. The sixth frame lasted 36 minutes, when O’Sullivan struck in the pink to a distant pocket before clipping in a tricky black for a 5–1 lead. McCulloch won the next to bring the score to 5–2 in O'Sullivan's favour at the end of the first session. In the second session O'Sullivan took the first two frames with breaks of 66 and 104. O'Sullivan won two of the next three frames to bring the score to 8–4, before missing a relatively straightforward pot in the 13th, which allowed McCulloch to take the frame. A break of 71 in the next gave O'Sullivan the victory.

== Prize fund ==
The breakdown of prize money for this year is shown below:

- Winner: £60,000
- Runner-up: £30,000
- Semi-final: £15,000
- Quarter-final: £11,000
- Last 16: £7,000
- Last 32: £5,000
- Last 64: £3,000
- Highest break: £4,000
- Maximum break: £20,000
- Total: £400,000

== Main draw ==
Numbers to the left of the players' names are the tournament seedings. Players in bold indicate match winners.

Round 1 Best of 9 frames
1	**Ronnie O'Sullivan** (ENG)	**5**
Mark Davis (ENG)	2
31	**Joe Swail** (NIR)	**5**
Mike Dunn (ENG)	3
15	**Graeme Dott** (SCO)	**5**
Ryan Day (WAL)	4
32	**Dominic Dale** (WAL)	**5**
Scott MacKenzie (SCO)	1
12	Chris Small (SCO)	4
**Mark Selby** (ENG)	**5**
27	Drew Henry (SCO)	4
**Leo Fernandez** (IRL)	**5**
8	**Peter Ebdon** (ENG)	**5**
Simon Bedford (ENG)	2
23	Mark King (ENG)	0
**Joe Jogia** (ENG)	**5**
7	**Ken Doherty** (IRL)	**5**
Anthony Davies (WAL)	1
31	John Parrott (ENG)	2
**James Wattana** (THA)	**5**
9	**Stephen Lee** (ENG)	**5**
Hugh Abernethy (SCO)	2
25	**Anthony Hamilton** (ENG)	**5**
Jimmy Michie (ENG)	2
13	**Steve Davis** (ENG)	**5**
Sean Storey (ENG)	1
22	**Tony Drago** (MLT)	**5**
Jin Long (CHN)	3
4	**Paul Hunter** (ENG)	**5**
Darren Morgan (WAL)	3
19	**Ali Carter** (ENG)	**5**
Adrian Gunnell (ENG)	4
3	**Stephen Hendry** (SCO)	**5**
Jamie Burnett (SCO)	4
28	**Robert Milkins** (ENG)	**5**
Rory McLeod (ENG)	2
11	**Jimmy White** (ENG)	**5**
Patrick Wallace (NIR)	4
17	**Ian McCulloch** (ENG)	**5**
Rod Lawler (ENG)	4
10	**Alan McManus** (SCO)	**5**
Fergal O'Brien (IRL)	4
26	Gerard Greene (NIR)	2
**Nigel Bond** (ENG)	**5**
5	John Higgins (SCO)	3
**Ricky Walden** (ENG)	**5**
24	**Stephen Maguire** (SCO)	**5**
Shaun Murphy (ENG)	2
6	Matthew Stevens (WAL)	1
**Andy Hicks** (ENG)	**5**
29	Michael Holt (ENG)	2
**Neil Robertson** (AUS)	**5**
14	**David Gray** (ENG)	**5**
Lee Walker (WAL)	0
20	**Joe Perry** (ENG)	**5**
Shokat Ali (PAK)	1
16	**Marco Fu** (HKG)	**5**
David Roe (ENG)	2
21	Barry Pinches (ENG)	4
**Barry Hawkins** (ENG)	**5**
2	Mark Williams (WAL)	2
**Michael Judge** (IRL)	**5**
18	Quinten Hann (AUS)	3
**Marcus Campbell** (SCO)	**5**

Round 2 Best of 9 frames
1	**Ronnie O'Sullivan** (ENG)	**5**
30	Joe Swail (NIR)	1
15	**Graeme Dott** (SCO)	**5**
32	Dominic Dale (WAL)	2
**Mark Selby** (ENG)	**5**
Leo Fernandez (IRL)	2
8	**Peter Ebdon** (ENG)	**5**
Joe Jogia (ENG)	4
7	Ken Doherty (IRL)	3
**James Wattana** (THA)	**5**
9	**Stephen Lee** (ENG)	**5**
25	Anthony Hamilton (ENG)	1
13	**Steve Davis** (ENG)	**5**
22	Tony Drago (MLT)	1
4	**Paul Hunter** (ENG)	**5**
19	Ali Carter (ENG)	4
3	**Stephen Hendry** (SCO)	**5**
28	Robert Milkins (ENG)	3
11	Jimmy White (ENG)	4
17	**Ian McCulloch** (ENG)	**5**
10	Alan McManus (SCO)	4
**Nigel Bond** (ENG)	**5**
Ricky Walden (ENG)	3
24	**Stephen Maguire** (SCO)	**5**
Andy Hicks (ENG)	3
**Neil Robertson** (AUS)	**5**
14	David Gray (ENG)	3
20	**Joe Perry** (ENG)	**5**
16	**Marco Fu** (HKG)	**5**
Barry Hawkins (ENG)	4
**Michael Judge** (IRL)	**5**
Marcus Campbell (SCO)	4

Round 3 Best of 9 frames
1	**Ronnie O'Sullivan** (ENG)	**5**
15	Graeme Dott (SCO)	3
**Mark Selby** (ENG)	**5**
8	Peter Ebdon (ENG)	3
**James Wattana** (THA)	**5**
9	Stephen Lee (ENG)	1
13	Steve Davis (ENG)	1
4	**Paul Hunter** (ENG)	**5**
3	Stephen Hendry (SCO)	3
17	**Ian McCulloch** (ENG)	**5**
Nigel Bond (ENG)	1
24	**Stephen Maguire** (SCO)	**5**
Neil Robertson (AUS)	3
20	**Joe Perry** (ENG)	**5**
16	Marco Fu (HKG)	1
**Michael Judge** (IRL)	**5**

Quarter-finals; Best of 9 frames
1	**Ronnie O'Sullivan** (ENG)	**5**
Mark Selby (ENG)	0
James Wattana (THA)	0
4	**Paul Hunter** (ENG)	**5**
17	**Ian McCulloch** (ENG)	**5**
24	Stephen Maguire (SCO)	2
20	Joe Perry (ENG)	1
**Michael Judge** (IRL)	**5**

Semi-finals; Best of 11 frames
1	**Ronnie O'Sullivan** (ENG)	**6**
4	Paul Hunter (ENG)	3
17	**Ian McCulloch** (ENG)	**6**
Michael Judge (IRL)	1

Final; Best of 17 frames
1	**Ronnie O'Sullivan** (ENG)	**9**
17	Ian McCulloch (ENG)	5

== Final ==
Scores in bold denote winning frame scores and the winning participant.

Final: Best of 17 frames. Referee: Jan Verhaas. Guild Hall, Preston, England. 10 October 2004.
**Ronnie O'Sullivan** (1); England	**9**–5	Ian McCulloch (17); England
Afternoon: **99**–4 (86), **70**–20, 1–**75**, **104**–0 (104), **80**–7 (72), **62**–58, 8–**65** (54); Evening: 53–**80** (66), **111**–7 (104), **80**–32, 0–**91** (69), **74**–17 (55), 44–**78** (78), **107**–23 (71)
**104**	Highest break	78
**2**	Century breaks	0
**6**	50+ breaks	4

== Qualifying ==
The qualifying for the tournament took place between 8 and 9 September 2004 at Pontin's in Prestatyn, Wales. All matches were best of 9 frames. Players in bold denote match winners.

**Mark Davis** (ENG)	**5**–2	Paul Davies (WAL)
**Mike Dunn** (ENG)	**5**–0	Paul Wykes (ENG)
**Ryan Day** (WAL)	**5**–4	David McDonnell (IRL)
Robin Hull (FIN)	4–**5**	**Scott MacKenzie** (SCO)
**Mark Selby** (ENG)	**5**–4	Gary Wilson (ENG)
Brian Morgan (ENG)	4–**5**	**Leo Fernandez** (IRL)
Nick Walker (ENG)	1–**5**	**Simon Bedford** (ENG)
Stuart Bingham (ENG)	4–**5**	**Joe Jogia** (ENG)
**Anthony Davies** (WAL)	**5**–4	Alfie Burden (ENG)
**James Wattana** (THA)	**5**–2	Mark Gray (ENG)
Gary Wilkinson (ENG)	4–**5**	**Hugh Abernethy** (SCO)
**Jimmy Michie** (ENG)	**5**–2	Brian Salmon (ENG)
**Sean Storey** (ENG)	**5**–2	Craig Butler (ENG)
Bjorn Haneveer (BEL)	0–**5**	**Jin Long** (CHN)
Dave Harold (ENG)	4–**5**	**Darren Morgan** (WAL)
**Adrian Gunnell** (ENG)	**5**–0	Steve James (ENG)

**Jamie Burnett** (SCO)	**5**–2	(England) David Hall
Stuart Pettman (ENG)	1–**5**	**Rory McLeod** (ENG)
**Patrick Wallace** (NIR)	**5**–2	Andrew Norman (ENG)
**Rod Lawler** (ENG)	**5**–1	(Northern Ireland) Sean O'Neill
**Fergal O'Brien** (IRL)	**5**–3	Adam Davies (ENG)
**Nigel Bond** (ENG)	**5**–2	Joe Delaney (IRL)
Nick Dyson (ENG)	1–**5**	**Ricky Walden** (ENG)
**Shaun Murphy** (ENG)	**5**–0	Mike Hallett (ENG)
**Andy Hicks** (ENG)	**5**–1	Ding Junhui (CHN)
Dave Finbow (ENG)	0–**5**	**Neil Robertson** (AUS)
**Lee Walker** (WAL)	**5**–2	Stefan Mazrocis (NLD)
Jonathan Birch (ENG)	2–**5**	**Shokat Ali** (PAK)
**David Roe** (ENG)	**5**–0	Paul Davison (ENG)
**Barry Hawkins** (ENG)	**5**–1	Rodney Goggins (IRL)
**Michael Judge** (IRL)	**5**–4	Tom Ford (ENG)
**Marcus Campbell** (SCO)	**5**–1	Ben Woollaston (ENG)

== Century breaks ==
=== Qualifying stage centuries ===
The qualifying stage of the 2004 Grand Prix yielded a total of eight century breaks compiled by eight different players. The highest was a 142 made by Rory McLeod.

- 142 – Rory McLeod
- 140 – Nigel Bond
- 140 – Michael Judge
- 114 – Ding Junhui
- 100 – Robin Hull
- 100 – Patrick Wallace
- 100 – Ricky Walden
- 100 – Neil Robertson

=== Televised stage centuries ===
A total of 34 century breaks were made by 16 different players during the main stages of the 2004 Grand Prix. The highest break was a maximum break which was made by Higgins in his first round 3–5 loss to Walden.

- 147 – John Higgins
- 137, 134, 132, 105 – Ian McCulloch
- 135, 135, 115, 107, 104, 104 – Ronnie O'Sullivan
- 133, 103, 100 – Joe Perry
- 133 – Rod Lawler
- 132, 118 – Alan McManus
- 129, 127, 106 – Andy Hicks
- 127, 114, 108, 102 – Paul Hunter
- 119, 113 – Graeme Dott
- 117 – Peter Ebdon
- 114, 108 – Dominic Dale
- 112 – Michael Judge
- 103 – Marco Fu
- 102 – Stephen Maguire
- 101 – Stephen Hendry
- 100 – Mark Davis

== Bibliography ==
- "Grand Prix results/draw". BBC Sport.
- "totesport Grand Prix 2004". snooker.org.
- "Embassy World Rankings 2004/2005". snooker.org.
