= 2003 British Open =

Tournament information
- Dates: 8–16 November 2003
- Venue: Brighton Centre
- City: Brighton
- Country: England
- Organisation: WPBSA
- Format: Ranking event
- Total prize fund: £450,000
- Winner's share: £52,000
- Highest break: John Higgins (SCO) (147)

Final
- Champion: Stephen Hendry (SCO)
- Runner-up: Ronnie O'Sullivan (ENG)
- Score: 9–6

The 2003 British Open was the 2003 edition of the British Open professional ranking snooker tournament, that was held from 8–16 November 2003 at the Brighton Centre, Brighton, England. Stephen Hendry won the tournament by defeating Ronnie O'Sullivan nine frames to six in the final. The final saw a record 5 centuries in a row from the two players (three from O'Sullivan and two from Hendry, including a 135), which remains a joint record for consecutive centuries made between two players in a professional tournament match and is a standalone record for ranking events and finals.

== Prize fund ==
The breakdown of prize money for this year is shown below:

Winner: £52,000
Runner-up: £26,000
Semi-final: £13,000
Quarter-final: £9,500
Last 16: £7,450
Last 32: £5,600
Last 48: £3,900
Last 64: £2,750

Last 80: £1,750
Last 96: £1,100

Stage one highest break: £1,800
Stage two highest break: £5,000

Stage one maximum break: £5,000
Stage two maximum break: £20,000

Total: £450,000

== Main draw ==
Last 48; Best of 9 frames
23 | (England) Dave Harold | 1
64 | (England) Shaun Murphy | 5
18 | (Scotland) Chris Small | 3
55 | (England) Nick Dyson | 5
24 | (Malta) Tony Drago | 5
40 | (England) Nigel Bond | 2
19 | (Hong Kong) Marco Fu | 5
42 | (England) Barry Hawkins | 4
17 | (England) Ali Carter | 1
50 | (Northern Ireland) Gerard Greene | 5
27 | (Northern Ireland) Joe Swail | 5
43 | (England) Stuart Bingham | 1
30 | (England) John Parrott | 4
62 | (England) Andy Hicks | 5
29 | (England) Mark Selby | 3
41 | (Scotland) Stephen Maguire | 5
28 | (Wales) Dominic Dale | 5
(Northern Ireland) Patrick Wallace | 2
26 | (England) Ian McCulloch | 3
(England) Tom Ford | 5
21 | (England) Robert Milkins | 3
35 | (England) Mark Davis | 5
32 | (Finland) Robin Hull | 1
37 | (Republic of Ireland) Michael Judge | 5
25 | (Scotland) Drew Henry | 3
(England) Ricky Walden | 5
22 | (England) Mark King | 5
36 | (England) Barry Pinches | 0
31 | (Wales) Anthony Davies | 2
33 | (Republic of Ireland) Fergal O'Brien | 5
20 | (England) Anthony Hamilton | 2
39 | (England) Michael Holt | 5

Last 32; Best of 9 frames
1 | (England) Paul Hunter | 5
64 | (England) Shaun Murphy | 2
12 | (England) David Gray | 5
55 | (England) Nick Dyson | 2
15 | (England) Jimmy White | 2
24 | (Malta) Tony Drago | 5
6 | (England) Stephen Lee | 5
19 | (Hong Kong) Marco Fu | 2
7 | (Republic of Ireland) Ken Doherty | 2
50 | (Northern Ireland) Gerard Greene | 5
11 | (England) Steve Davis | 3
27 | (Northern Ireland) Joe Swail | 5
14 | (Australia) Quinten Hann | 5
62 | (England) Andy Hicks | 3
4 | (England) Ronnie O'Sullivan | 5
41 | (Scotland) Stephen Maguire | 3
3 | (Scotland) Stephen Hendry | 5
28 | (Wales) Dominic Dale | 2
16 | (England) Joe Perry | 5
(England) Tom Ford | 1
10 | (Scotland) Alan McManus | 4
35 | (England) Mark Davis | 5
5 | (Scotland) John Higgins | 5
37 | (Republic of Ireland) Michael Judge | 1
8 | (England) Peter Ebdon | 5
(England) Ricky Walden | 2
9 | (Wales) Matthew Stevens | 5
22 | (England) Mark King | 1
13 | (Scotland) Graeme Dott | 4
33 | (Republic of Ireland) Fergal O'Brien | 5
2 | (Wales) Mark Williams | 5
39 | (England) Michael Holt | 2

Last 16; Best of 9 frames
1 | (England) Paul Hunter | 5
12 | (England) David Gray | 3
24 | (Malta) Tony Drago | 0
6 | (England) Stephen Lee | 5
50 | (Northern Ireland) Gerard Greene | 5
27 | (Northern Ireland) Joe Swail | 1
14 | (Australia) Quinten Hann | 1
4 | (England) Ronnie O'Sullivan | 5
3 | (Scotland) Stephen Hendry | 5
16 | (England) Joe Perry | 0
35 | (England) Mark Davis | 2
5 | (Scotland) John Higgins | 5
8 | (England) Peter Ebdon | 3
9 | (Wales) Matthew Stevens | 5
33 | (Republic of Ireland) Fergal O'Brien | 2
2 | (Wales) Mark Williams | 5

Quarter-finals; Best of 9 frames
1 | (England) Paul Hunter | 3
6 | (England) Stephen Lee | 5
50 | (Northern Ireland) Gerard Greene | 4
4 | (England) Ronnie O'Sullivan | 5
3 | (Scotland) Stephen Hendry | 5
5 | (Scotland) John Higgins | 4
9 | (Wales) Matthew Stevens | 5
2 | (Wales) Mark Williams | 1

Semi-finals; Best of 11 frames
6 | (England) Stephen Lee | 2
4 | (England) Ronnie O'Sullivan | 6
3 | (Scotland) Stephen Hendry | 6
9 | (Wales) Matthew Stevens | 3

Final; Best of 17 frames
4 | (England) Ronnie O'Sullivan | 6
3 | (Scotland) Stephen Hendry | 9

== Final ==
Final: Best of 17 frames. Referee: Eirian Williams. Brighton Centre, Brighton, England. 16 November 2003.
| Ronnie O'Sullivan (4); England | 6–9 | Stephen Hendry (3); Scotland |
Afternoon: 103–29 (62), 78–37 (61), 2–59, 0–135 (135), 106–0 (106), 104–0 (100), 0–135 (121), 109–0 (109); Evening: 28–84 (61), 4–89 (50), 0–135 (135), 56–78 (56, 78), 0–95 (95), 70–5 (64), 12–72
| 109 | Highest break | 135 |
| 3 | Century breaks | 3 |
| 7 | 50+ breaks | 7 |

== Qualifying ==
Qualifying for the tournament took place at Pontins in Prestatyn, Wales between 21 and 25 September 2003.

=== Round 1 ===
Best of 9 frames

| (Thailand) Kwan Poomjang | 5–4 | (England) Stephen Croft |
| (England) Andrew Norman | 5–2 | (Wales) Ian Sargeant |
| (England) Wayne Brown | 5–1 | (England) Chris Melling |
| (Wales) Ryan Day | 5–3 | (Thailand) Supoj Saenla |
| (England) Paul Wykes | 5–2 | (Republic of Ireland) Garry Hardiman |
| (England) Jason Ferguson | 1–5 | (Australia) Steve Mifsud |
| (Scotland) Billy Snaddon | 5–4 | (England) James Leadbetter |
| (England) Luke Fisher | 5–2 | (China) Ding Junhui |
| (England) Andrew Higginson | 5–2 | (England) Stuart Mann |
| (Northern Ireland) Terry Murphy | 1–5 | (Australia) Neil Robertson |
| (England) Craig Butler | 5–2 | (England) Paul Sweeny |
| (England) Simon Bedford | 3–5 | (Wales) Philip Williams |
| (Republic of Ireland) Leo Fernandez | w/d–w/o | (Scotland) Gary Thomson |
| (Wales) Paul Davies | 5–1 | (Norway) Kurt Maflin |
| (Iceland) Kristján Helgason | 4–5 | (England) Michael Wild |
| (England) Munraj Pal | 5–4 | (England) Carlo Giagnacovo |

| (Scotland) Martin Dziewialtowski | 5–2 | (Republic of Ireland) Joe Delaney |
| (England) Bradley Jones | 5–1 | (England) Luke Simmonds |
| (Northern Ireland) Jason Prince | 4–5 | (England) Michael Rhodes |
| (Wales) Lee Walker | 2–5 | (England) Tom Ford |
| (England) Rory McLeod | 5–3 | (England) Andy Neck |
| (Australia) Johl Younger | 5–1 | (England) Steven Bennie |
| (England) Jamie Cope | 5–4 | (Cyprus) Mehmet Husnu |
| (England) Matthew Couch | 5–4 | (China) Liu Song |
| (England) Ricky Walden | 5–0 | (England) Martin Gould |
| (England) David Gilbert | 4–5 | (England) Darryn Walker |
| (England) Adrian Gunnell | 5–3 | (Wales) Ian Preece |
| (England) Joe Johnson | w/d–w/o | (Canada) Alain Robidoux |
| (England) Peter Lines | 5–1 | (Scotland) Scott MacKenzie |
| (Thailand) Atthasit Mahitthi | 5–2 | (England) Ian Brumby |
| (England) Tony Jones | 0–5 | (England) Adrian Rosa |
| (Republic of Ireland) Colm Gilcreest | 5–4 | (Northern Ireland) Joe Meara |

=== Round 2–4 ===
Round 2 Best of 9 frames
(Thailand) Kwan Poomjang | 3
(England) Andrew Norman | 5
(England) Wayne Brown | 3
(Wales) Ryan Day | 5
(England) Paul Wykes | 5
(Australia) Steve Mifsud | 4
(Scotland) Billy Snaddon | 5
(England) Luke Fisher | 4
(England) Andrew Higginson | 5
(Australia) Neil Robertson | 1
(England) Craig Butler | 5
(Wales) Philip Williams | 1
(Scotland) Gary Thomson | 5
(Wales) Paul Davies | 2
(England) Michael Wild | 5
(England) Munraj Pal | 3
(Scotland) Martin Dziewialtowski | 5
(England) Bradley Jones | 0
(England) Michael Rhodes | 1
(England) Tom Ford | 5
(England) Rory McLeod | 3
(Australia) Johl Younger | 5
(England) Jamie Cope | 4
(England) Matthew Couch | 5
(England) Ricky Walden | 5
(England) Darryn Walker | 1
(England) Adrian Gunnell | 5
(Canada) Alain Robidoux | 1
(England) Peter Lines | 3
(Thailand) Atthasit Mahitthi | 5
(England) Adrian Rosa | 5
(Republic of Ireland) Colm Gilcreest | 3

Round 3 Best of 9 frames
(England) Shaun Murphy | 5
(England) Andrew Norman | 2
(England) Nick Dyson | 5
(Wales) Ryan Day | 1
(England) David Roe | 5
(England) Paul Wykes | 3
(England) Dave Finbow | 1
(Scotland) Billy Snaddon | 5
(Belgium) Bjorn Haneveer | 3
(England) Andrew Higginson | 5
(England) Sean Storey | 3
(England) Craig Butler | 5
(England) Andy Hicks | 5
(Scotland) Gary Thomson | 4
(England) Mike Dunn | 5
(England) Michael Wild | 4
(Northern Ireland) Patrick Wallace | 5
(Scotland) Martin Dziewialtowski | 0
(England) Alfie Burden | 1
(England) Tom Ford | 5
(Pakistan) Shokat Ali | 4
(Australia) Johl Younger | 5
(England) Nick Walker | 5
(England) Matthew Couch | 3
(Wales) Darren Morgan | 1
(England) Ricky Walden | 5
(Scotland) Marcus Campbell | 5
(England) Adrian Gunnell | 0
(England) Rod Lawler | 4
(Thailand) Atthasit Mahitthi | 5
(England) Jimmy Michie | 1
(England) Adrian Rosa | 5

Round 4 Best of 9 frames
(England) Gary Wilkinson | 4
(England) Shaun Murphy | 5
(Scotland) Jamie Burnett | 2
(England) Nick Dyson | 5
(England) Nigel Bond | 5
(England) David Roe | 0
(England) Barry Hawkins | 5
(Scotland) Billy Snaddon | 0
(Northern Ireland) Gerard Greene | 5
(England) Andrew Higginson | 1
(England) Stuart Bingham | 5
(England) Craig Butler | 1
(England) Stuart Pettman | 3
(England) Andy Hicks | 5
(Scotland) Stephen Maguire | 5
(England) Mike Dunn | 2
(England) Jonathan Birch | 0 (Note: Birch conceded the match at 0–3 down.)
(Northern Ireland) Patrick Wallace | 5
(England) Brian Morgan | 2
(England) Tom Ford | 5
(England) Mark Davis | 5
(Australia) Johl Younger | 0
(Republic of Ireland) Michael Judge | 5
(England) Nick Walker | 1
(Thailand) James Wattana | 3
(England) Ricky Walden | 5
(England) Barry Pinches | 5
(Scotland) Marcus Campbell | 2
(Republic of Ireland) Fergal O'Brien | 5
(Thailand) Atthasit Mahitthi | 4
(England) Michael Holt | 5
(England) Adrian Rosa | 4

== Century breaks ==
=== Qualifying stage centuries ===
- 145, 103 – Ian McCulloch
- 138, 126, 110 – Andy Hicks
- 138 – Stephen Maguire
- 135, 130, 103 – Adrian Rosa
- 134, 117 – Ricky Walden
- 133 – Fergal O'Brien
- 132 – Stuart Bingham
- 132 – Peter Lines
- 131 – Kwan Poomjang
- 125 – Darryn Walker
- 123, 112 – Billy Snaddon
- 121 – Barry Pinches
- 119 – Gerard Greene
- 118, 109, 103 – Tom Ford
- 117 – Joe Swail
- 110, 107 – Ryan Day
- 110, 104 – Andrew Norman
- 106 – Martin Dziewialtowski
- 106 – Nick Dyson
- 105, 101 – David Roe
- 104 – Phil Williams
- 104 – Wayne Brown
- 102 – Ian Brumby
- 102 – Craig Butler
- 102 – Marco Fu
- 101 – Andrew Higginson
- 101 – Anthony Hamilton

=== Televised stage centuries ===
- 147, 135, 118 – John Higgins
- 138 – Michael Judge
- 135, 135, 134, 133, 121, 120 – Stephen Hendry
- 130, 127 – Ken Doherty
- 130 – Jimmy White
- 123 – Alan McManus
- 120 – Stephen Lee
- 116, 100 – Dominic Dale
- 115, 105 – Quinten Hann
- 114 – David Gray
- 112, 104 – Paul Hunter
- 111, 109 – Matthew Stevens
- 111, 104 – Mark Williams
- 109, 106, 100, 100 – Ronnie O'Sullivan
- 107 – Gerard Greene
- 107 – Graeme Dott
- 104 – Michael Holt
