= Paul Collier (snooker referee) =

Welsh retired snooker referee

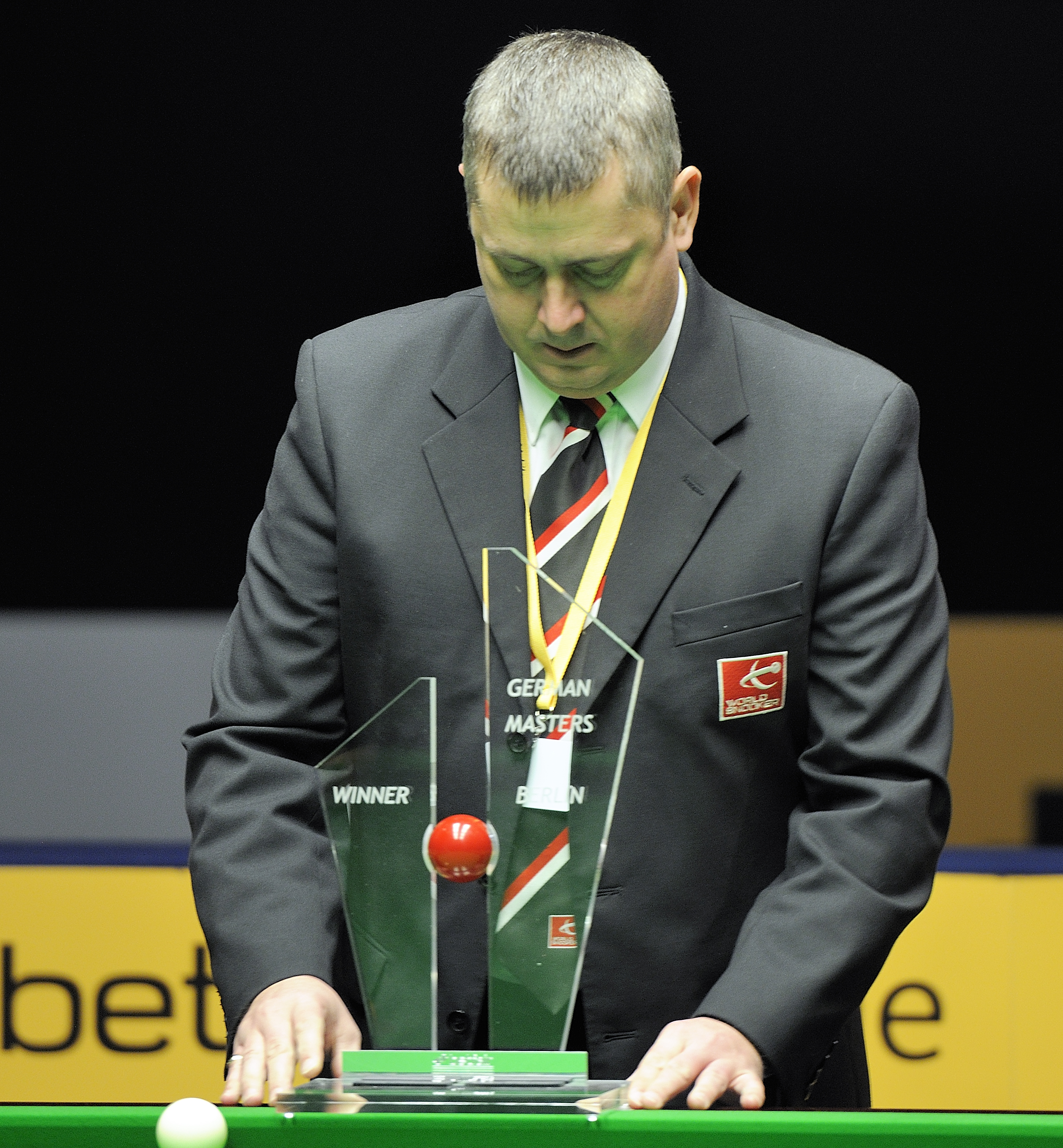

Personal information
- Born: 30 July 1970 (age 56) Newport, Wales

Sport
- Country: Wales
- Sport: Snooker
- Professional: 1992–2024

Paul Collier (born 30 July 1970, in Newport, Wales) is a Welsh retired snooker referee who has overseen four World Snooker Championship finals. In 2024 he retired from refereeing to focus on his role as a tournament director.

== Career ==
Born in Newport, South Wales, Collier began refereeing on the professional snooker circuit in 1992. In 2004, he took charge of the World Snooker Championship final between Ronnie O'Sullivan and Graeme Dott where he also became the youngest referee to take charge of a world championship final.

Eighteen months after the 2004 final, in 2005, Collier quit the main tour, citing the lack of financial rewards in his profession. With only five ranking snooker events, he was no longer enjoying the tour. He was persuaded by Barry Hearn to re-join the main professional tour in 2011, with the additional opportunity to work as a Tournament Director.

In 2016, he refereed the final of the 2016 World Snooker Championship between Mark Selby and Ding Junhui. In 2021, he took charge of his third Crucible final during the 2021 World Snooker Championship. He returned to referee his fourth and last final in 2024, after which he retired as a snooker referee, to focus on his role as a tournament director.
