= Ian McCulloch (snooker player) =

English snooker player (born 1971)

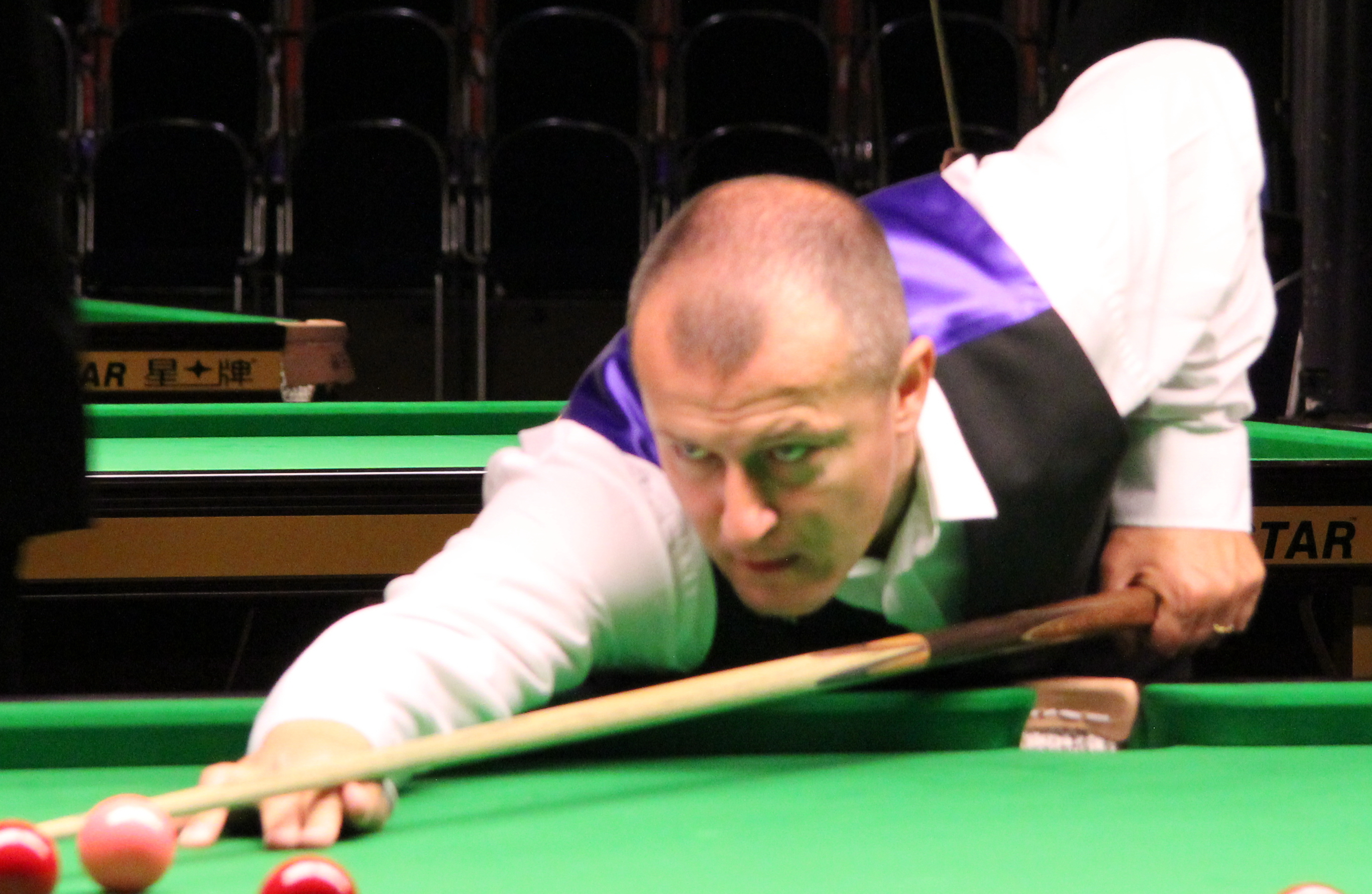
- Paul Hunter Classic 2011

Personal information
- Nickname: The Preston Potter
- Born: 28 July 1971 (age 55) Walton-le-Dale, Preston, England

Sport
- Country: England
- Sport: Snooker
- Professional: 1992–2012
- Highest ranking: 16 (2005/06)
- Century breaks: 105
- Best ranking finish: Runner-up (x2)

Ian McCulloch (born 28 July 1971) is an English former professional snooker player from Walton-Le-Dale, Preston, Lancashire.

== Career ==
McCulloch turned professional in 1992, and after steadily climbing up the rankings for many years, he reached the quarter-finals of a ranking event for the first time in the 1999 Welsh Open. He also made his debut in the Crucible stages of the 1999 World Championship.

He entered his best form in his early 30s. He reached two ranking event finals – the 2002 British Open (losing to Paul Hunter) and the 2004 Grand Prix in his home town (losing to Ronnie O'Sullivan).

He reached the quarter finals of the 2004 World Snooker Championship. He went one stage further in 2005, losing 14–17 to Matthew Stevens in the semi-final, beating Graeme Dott, Mark Williams and Alan McManus en route. McCulloch was ranked number 16 in the rankings in 2005/2006 season, which would normally guarantee a seeding in the ranking tournaments, but was pushed out by Shaun Murphy, who as the reigning world champion was not in the top 16 of the rankings, and was seeded ahead of him in tournaments.

In his 2005–06 season a quarter-final appearance in the Welsh Open was the highlight. He failed to qualify for the World Championship, losing to Dave Harold, causing him to drop down the rankings. He made his first appearance as a BBC pundit during the tournament.

An improved 2006–07 campaign included a quarter-final run in the Grand Prix. He qualified for the World Championship, and in the first round he eliminated defending champion Graeme Dott 10–7, but he lost in the second round 8–13 to Anthony Hamilton.

In the 2007 UK Championship he also knocked out the defending champion, by coming from 0–5 down against Peter Ebdon to beat him 9–8 in a remarkable comeback. He lost to Stephen Maguire 5–9 in the last 16. He missed out on the 2008 World Championship after losing 5–10 to eventual quarter-finalist, Liang Wenbo.

The 2008–09 season was a struggle, with only two wins in the first five tournaments. He failed to qualify for the World Championship again, losing to Rory McLeod despite scoring three centuries. After the 2011/12 season, he decided to quit the game for good after finishing number 68 in the world. This was in part motivated by an occupational shoulder injury. His best run was at the Welsh Open where he reached the final qualifying round before losing to Tom Ford 3–4.

On 11 October 2009, he won the Bodensee Open, although he was the only professional player taking part.

== Broadcasting ==
McCulloch is a regular pundit for William Hill and can be heard in their shops previewing snooker tournaments and as a regular in-studio guest on their In-Play Radio service.

== Performance and rankings timeline ==
| Tournament | 1992/ 93 | 1993/ 94 | 1994/ 95 | 1995/ 96 | 1996/ 97 | 1997/ 98 | 1998/ 99 | 1999/ 00 | 2000/ 01 | 2001/ 02 | 2002/ 03 | 2003/ 04 | 2004/ 05 | 2005/ 06 | 2006/ 07 | 2007/ 08 | 2008/ 09 | 2009/ 10 | 2010/ 11 | 2011/ 12 |
|---|---|---|---|---|---|---|---|---|---|---|---|---|---|---|---|---|---|---|---|---|
| Ranking (Note: From the 2010/2011 season it shows the ranking at the beginning of the season.) | (Note: New players on the Main Tour don't have a ranking.) | 404 | 257 | 193 | 105 | 76 | 60 | 39 | 38 | 48 | 43 | 26 | 17 | 16 | 26 | 28 | 25 | 35 | 48 | 63 |
Ranking tournaments
| Australian Goldfields Open (Note: The event was also called the Australian Open (1994/1995)) | Not Held | | NR | | Tournament Not Held | | | | | | | | | | | | | | | LQ |
| Shanghai Masters | Tournament Not Held | | | | | | | | | | | | | | | 2R | LQ | LQ | LQ | LQ |
| UK Championship | LQ | LQ | LQ | LQ | LQ | 1R | LQ | LQ | LQ | LQ | 1R | 2R | 1R | 1R | 1R | 2R | 1R | LQ | LQ | LQ |
| German Masters (Note: The event ran under a different name as the German Open (1995/1996–1997/1998)) | Not Held | | | LQ | LQ | 1R | NR | Tournament Not Held | | | | | | | | | | | WD | LQ |
| Welsh Open | LQ | 1R | LQ | LQ | 1R | 2R | 1R | QF | LQ | 1R | LQ | 1R | 2R | QF | 2R | 2R | LQ | LQ | LQ | LQ |
| World Open (Note: The event ran under different names such as the Grand Prix (1992/1993–2000/2001 and 2004/2005–2009/2010), LG Cup (2001/2002–2003/2004), World Open (2010/2011) and Haikou World Open (2011/2012)) | LQ | LQ | LQ | LQ | LQ | 1R | 1R | LQ | LQ | LQ | 1R | 1R | F | 2R | QF | RR | LQ | 1R | LQ | LQ |
| Players Championship Grand Final (Note: The event ran under a different name as the Players Tour Championship Grand Finals (2010/2011–2012/2013)) | Tournament Not Held | | | | | | | | | | | | | | | | | | DNQ | DNQ |
| China Open (Note: The event ran under a different name as the China International (1997/1998–1998/1999)) | Tournament Not Held | | | | | NR | LQ | LQ | 1R | 1R | Not Held | | LQ | LQ | 1R | LQ | LQ | LQ | LQ | LQ |
| World Championship | LQ | LQ | LQ | LQ | LQ | LQ | 1R | LQ | LQ | LQ | 1R | QF | SF | LQ | 2R | LQ | LQ | LQ | LQ | LQ |
Non-ranking tournaments
| The Masters | LQ | A | LQ | LQ | A | LQ | A | LQ | A | LQ | LQ | LQ | A | 1R | LQ | LQ | LQ | LQ | A | A |
| Championship League | Tournament Not Held | | | | | | | | | | | | | | | RR | A | A | A | A |
Former ranking tournaments
| Dubai Classic (Note: The event ran under different names such as the Thailand Classic (1995/1996) and Asian Classic (1996/1997)) | LQ | LQ | LQ | LQ | LQ | Tournament Not Held | | | | | | | | | | | | | | |
| Malta Grand Prix | Not Held | | Non-Ranking Event | | | | | LQ | NR | Tournament Not Held | | | | | | | | | | |
| Thailand Masters (Note: The event ran under different names such as the Asian Open (1992/1993) and Thailand Open (1993/1994–1996/1997)) | LQ | LQ | LQ | LQ | LQ | LQ | 1R | LQ | LQ | LQ | NR | Not Held | | | NR | Tournament Not Held | | | | |
| Scottish Open (Note: The event ran under different names such as the International Open (1992/1993–1996/1997) and Players Championship (2003/2004)) | LQ | LQ | LQ | LQ | LQ | LQ | 1R | 1R | 1R | LQ | 2R | QF | Tournament Not Held | | | | | | | |
| British Open | LQ | LQ | LQ | LQ | 2R | LQ | LQ | 1R | LQ | 2R | F | 1R | 1R | Tournament Not Held | | | | | | |
| Irish Masters | Non-Ranking Event | | | | | | | | | | LQ | 1R | 2R | NH | NR | Tournament Not Held | | | | |
| Malta Cup (Note: The event ran under different names such as the European Open (1992/1993–1996/1997 and 2001/2002–2003/2004) and Irish Open (1998/1999)) | LQ | LQ | LQ | LQ | LQ | NH | LQ | Not Held | | 1R | 1R | LQ | LQ | 1R | LQ | NR | Tournament Not Held | | | |
| Northern Ireland Trophy | Tournament Not Held | | | | | | | | | | | | | NR | 2R | 3R | QF | Not Held | | |
| Bahrain Championship | Tournament Not Held | | | | | | | | | | | | | | | | LQ | Not Held | | |
Former non-ranking tournaments
| Northern Ireland Trophy | Tournament Not Held | | | | | | | | | | | | | WR | Ranking Event | | | Not Held | | |
| Shoot-Out | Tournament Not Held | | | | | | | | | | | | | | | | | | 1R | 2R |

| NH / Not Held | event was not held. |
| NR / Non-Ranking Event | event is/was no longer a ranking event. |
| R / Ranking Event | event is/was a ranking event. |
| MR / Minor-Ranking Event | event is/was a minor-ranking event. |

== Career finals ==
=== Ranking tournaments: 2 ===
| Outcome | No. | Year | Championship | Opponent | Score |
|---|---|---|---|---|---|
| Runner-up | 1. | 2002 | British Open | (England) Paul Hunter | 4–9 |
| Runner-up | 2. | 2004 | Grand Prix | (England) Ronnie O'Sullivan | 5–9 |
