= 2004 World Snooker Championship =

Professional snooker tournament

2004 Embassy World Snooker Championship
Tournament information
- Dates: 17 April – 3 May 2004
- Venue: Crucible Theatre
- City: Sheffield
- Country: England
- Organisation: WPBSA
- Format: Ranking event
- Total prize fund: £1,378,920
- Winner's share: £250,000
- Highest break: Joe Perry (ENG) (145)

Final
- Champion: Ronnie O'Sullivan (ENG)
- Runner-up: Graeme Dott (SCO)
- Score: 18–8

The 2004 World Snooker Championship (officially the 2004 Embassy World Snooker Championship) was a professional snooker tournament that took place from 17 April to 3 May 2004 at the Crucible Theatre in Sheffield, England. It was the 28th consecutive year the World Snooker Championship was held at the Crucible. The eighth and final ranking event of the 2003–04 snooker season, the tournament was organised by the World Professional Billiards and Snooker Association and sponsored by cigarette brand Embassy. The total prize fund was £1,378,920, of which the winner received £250,000.

Qualifying rounds for the tournament took place from 10 to 20 February 2004 at Pontins in Prestatyn, Wales. The 16 players who progressed through these qualifying rounds met the top 16 players from the snooker world rankings. The main stage of the event was contested as a single-elimination tournament. Both Ryan Day and Stephen Maguire made their debuts in the main stage of the World Championship.

Mark Williams was the defending champion, having won the previous year's final 18–16 against Ken Doherty. He lost 11–13 to Joe Perry in the second round. Ronnie O'Sullivan, despite trailing 0–5 to Graeme Dott in the final, won the match 18–8 and claimed his second World Championship. This was the fourth biggest margin in a World final, a score O'Sullivan would recreate again in 2008 and 2020 over Ali Carter and Kyren Wilson, respectively. A total of 55 century breaks were compiled during the event's main stage, the highest being a 145 made by Joe Perry.

== Background ==
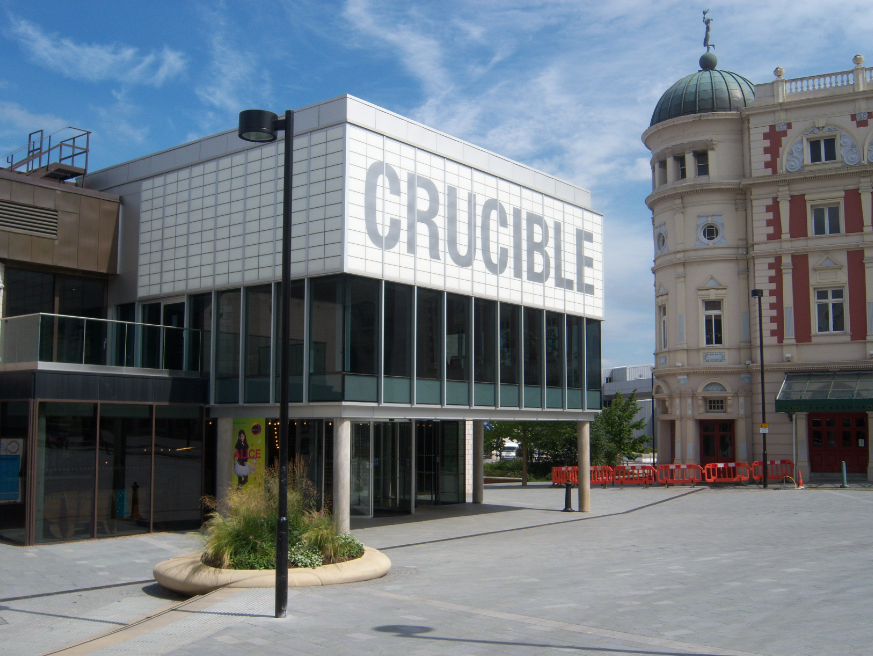
For the 28th consecutive year, the main stage of the tournament was held at the Crucible Theatre in Sheffield, England.

The inaugural 1927 World Snooker Championship, then known as the Professional Championship of Snooker, took place at various venues in England between November 1926 and May 1927. Joe Davis won the final—held at Camkin's Hall in Birmingham from 9 to 12 May 1927—and went on to win the tournament 15 consecutive times before retiring undefeated after the 1946 edition (no tournaments were held from 1941 to 1945 because of World War II). The tournament went into abeyance after only two players contested the 1952 edition, due to a dispute between the Professional Billiards Players' Association (PBPA) and the Billiards Association and Control Council (BACC). The PBPA established an alternative tournament, the World Professional Match-play Championship, of which the six editions held between 1952 and 1957 are retroactively regarded as legitimate continuations of the World Snooker Championship. However, due to waning public interest in snooker during the post-war era, that tournament was also discontinued, and the world title was uncontested between 1958 and 1963.

Then-professional player Rex Williams was instrumental in reviving the World Snooker Championship on a challenge basis in 1964. John Pulman, winner of the 1957 World Professional Match-play Championship, defended the world title across seven challenge matches between 1964 and 1968. The World Snooker Championship reverted to an annual knockout tournament for the 1969 edition, marking the beginning of the championship's "modern era". The 1977 edition was the first staged at the Crucible Theatre in Sheffield, where it has remained since. As of the 2003 edition, the most successful player in the modern era was Stephen Hendry, having won the title seven times. Hendry was also the tournament's youngest winner, having captured his first title at the 1990 event, aged 21 years and 106 days. Ray Reardon became the oldest winner when he secured his sixth title at the 1978 event, aged 45 years and 203 days.

== Overview ==
The 2004 World Snooker Championship was the eighth and last ranking tournament of the 2003–04 snooker season, held after the Players Championship. It was sponsored by cigarette brand Embassy. The 2004 edition marked the 28th consecutive year that the tournament was held at the Crucible and the 36th successive year that the World Championship was contested through the modern knockout format. The defending champion was Mark Williams, who had defeated Ken Doherty 18–16 in the final of the 2003 World Championship to win his second world title.

=== Format ===
The 2004 World Championship took place from 17 April to 3 May. The event featured a 32-player main draw, preceded by a qualifying tournament that was held at Pontins in Prestatyn, Wales, between 10 and 20 February 2004. The qualifiers were played over six rounds, higher-ranked players being seeded and given byes to the later rounds. All of the rounds were played as the best of 19 frames.

The top 16 players in the snooker world rankings automatically qualified for the main draw as seeded players. Defending champion Williams was automatically seeded first overall. The remaining 15 seeds were allocated based on the world rankings. The main stage of the event was contested as a single-elimination tournament. Matches in the first round of the main draw were played as the best of 19 frames, second-round matches and quarter-finals played as the best of 25 frames, and the semi-finals as the best of 33 frames. The final was played over two days as a best-of-35-frames match. Reaching the first round of the tournament's main stage were seventeen players from England, six from Scotland, five from Wales, and one each from Ireland, Thailand, Australia and Northern Ireland.

=== Prize fund ===
The winner of the event received £250,000 from a total fund of £1,378,920. The breakdown of prize money is shown below:

- Winner: £250,000
- Runner-up: £125,000
- Semi-final: £63,200
- Quarter-final: £31,600
- Last 16: £17,600
- Last 32: £12,000
- Last 48: £9,200
- Last 64: £5,720
- Last 80: £4,560
- Last 96: £3,440
- Last 128: £1,000
- Stage one highest break: £2,000
- Stage two highest break: £17,600
- Stage one maximum break: £5,000
- Stage two maximum break: £147,000
- Total: £1,378,920

== Summary ==
=== Qualifying ===
The qualifying competition was held in three stages at Pontin's, Prestatyn Sands. The first stage, for amateurs and non-Tour professionals, was played at Pontin's, Prestatyn Sands, on 11 January 2004. In stage two, from 12 to 17 January, Challenge Tour Professionals joined the draw. Stage three was played between 10 and 20 February. Former Russian pyramid champion Ashot Potikyan lost 2–5 to Adam Osborne in the first round. Mike Hallett came from 1–4 down against Craig Roper in the third round of the first stage and from 0–4 behind against Pete Roscoe in the fifth round, winning both matches 5–4. Hallett, a quarter-finalist in 1987 and 1989, won five matches in total before losing to Lee Walker. Walker then recorded wins against Gary Thomson, Alfie Burden, Barry Hawkins and Mark Selby to qualify. Three-time semi-finalist Tony Knowles beat Lee Richardson 5–1 in round three but lost 3–5 to David Hall in round four.

Steve James, a semi-finalist in 1991, won four matches to progress to the final stage from phase one. James then led Adrian Rosa 5–3, but Rosa won seven of the next eight frames to claim victory. Ryan Day compiled breaks of 145 and 140 against Rosa and Tony Jones, respectively. The 145 was the highest in qualifying and earned him £2,000. Mark Allen, a Northern Ireland amateur champion, was defeated 3–5 by Justin Astley in the third round. Astley then lost to Ian Preece 8–10. Trailing 0–9, Joe Johnson conceded to Preece. Preece then lost to David Finbow, who in turn was defeated by Brian Morgan. Joe Swail eliminated Morgan in the final round to qualify. Ding Junhui, aged 17, constructed two century breaks in each of his first three matches. Ding was eliminated by Barry Pinches, who also defeated Tony Drago to qualify.

John Parrott qualified for the Crucible, where he had appeared every year since the 1984 World Championship. Playing Stephen Maguire in the last round, Robin Hull withdrew after a vestibular disorder made him dizzy when playing, and so Maguire qualified. James Wattana, a semi-finalist both in 1993 and 1997, won 10–1 over fellow former semi-finalist Darren Morgan. Wattana then defeated Dave Harold with a 10–8 result to book a place at the Crucible. Trailing Munraj Pal 5–9, Nick Dyson avoided losing the fifteenth frame on the last black ball and then won four more consecutive frames to progress to the next round. He then lost to Ali Carter.

Leo Fernandez won two deciding frames, but lost 8–10 to Dominic Dale in the final round. Rory McLeod advanced through four rounds before being defeated 1–10 by Robert Milkins in the final qualifying match. Mark King qualified with a 10–8 victory against Adrian Gunnell. Andy Hicks won three qualifying matches, against Simon Bedford, Jamie Burnett and Anthony Davies, to book a place at the Crucible. Anthony Hamilton won his last-round match against Michael Holt in a decider. Ian McCulloch defeated Nigel Bond 10–7 in the final round. Chris Small qualified with a win by the same scoreline against Patrick Wallace. Stuart Pettman recorded victories with a 10–7 result over both Shaun Murphy and Marco Fu.

=== First round ===
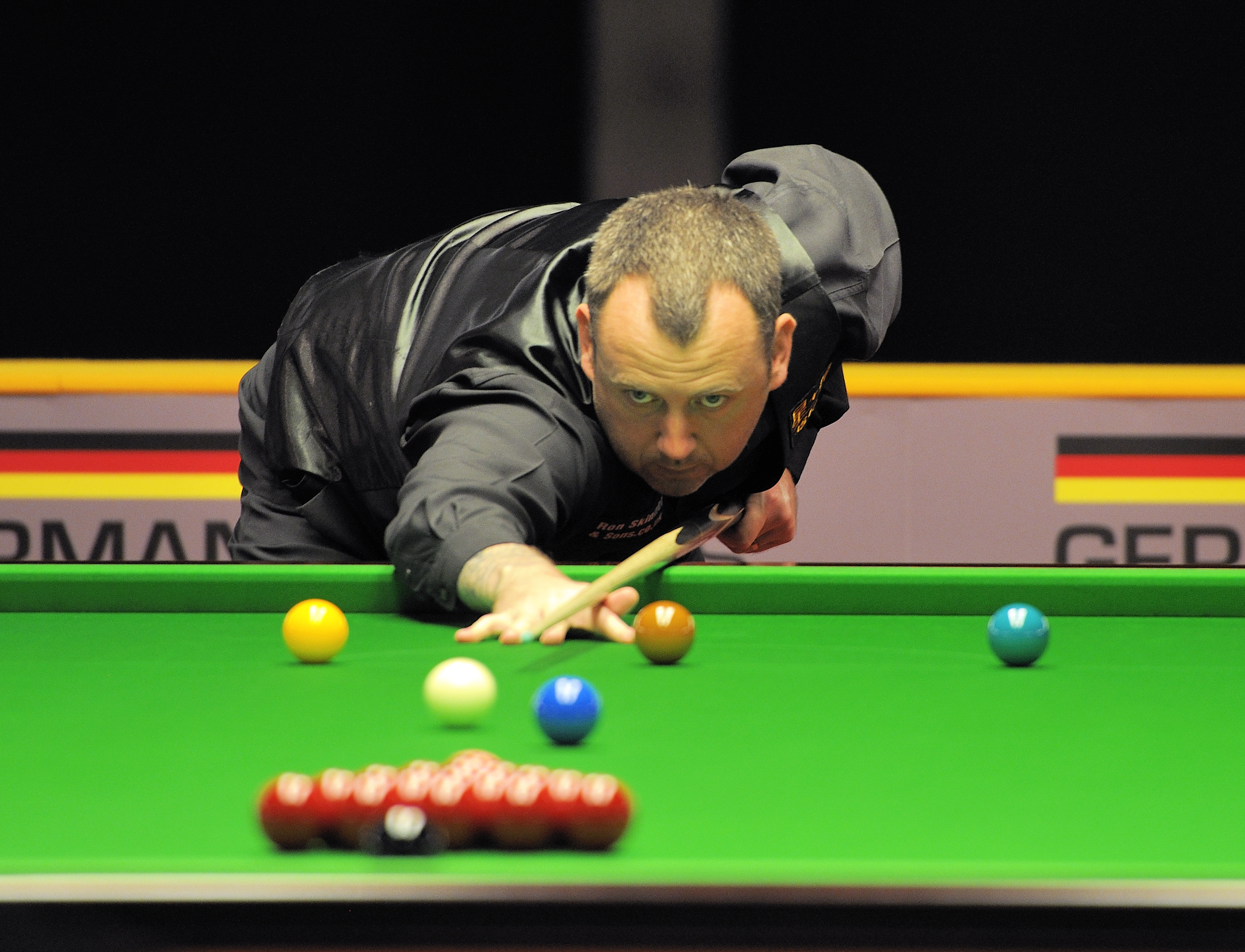
Defending champion Mark Williams (pictured in 2014) won over Dominic Dale the day after he became a father.

The first round was played between 17 and 22 April as the best of 19 frames. The defending champion, Mark Williams, played Dale. Williams, who became a father the day before the match was played, earned a 6–3 lead in the first session, with five breaks over 50, including a century break of 105 in the second frame. Dale responded and won three frames to draw level at 7–7. Williams, however, clinched victory with the last three frames, which included a half-century. "It's not the best preparation you can have, but if you're happy off the table you can carry that over," Williams commented after the match with regard to his fatherhood.

Six seeded players lost in the first round—Stephen Lee, Quinten Hann, Steve Davis, Peter Ebdon, Ken Doherty and Jimmy White. Although Lee fell 3–6 behind Walker, he managed to win three of the first four frames of the evening session to reduce the gap to a single frame. Walker, nonetheless, clinched the twelfth frame, which lasted 53 minutes, and ended up winning the match 10–7. Lee claimed afterwards that the defeat was the summary of "a terrible season" for him. Hicks advanced into the second round by beating Hann 10–4. Having already been warned for his language by referee Lawrie Annandale in the eleventh frame, he confronted Hicks once the match had ended and he admitted to having told him "You're short, bald and always will be, and can have me outside whenever you want". Hicks pointed out to him that he was likely to drop out of the top 16 as a result of the loss. The six-time champion Davis lost to Hamilton 7–10. Doherty, the 1997 winner, was beaten by two-time semi-finalist Swail 5–10. Doherty's defeat was the first time he had lost in round one since the 1995 event, and had since been champion once, finalist twice and three times a quarter-finalist. Ebdon played McCulloch, who was making his third-ever appearance at the Crucible, having previously qualified for the 1999 and 2003 events. The first session, which featured a 48-minutes-long frame, was shared at 4–4, and the balance was not broken after eight more frames, with a score of 8–8. McCulloch, whose safety and matchplay were praised by his rival, went on to win two frames and sealed the first Crucible victory in his career. Pinches qualified for the main stage for the first time since 1991. He faced White, recent European Open runner-up and Players Championship winner, in a match which overran and had to be completed after other matches; it ended as a 10–8 for Pinches.

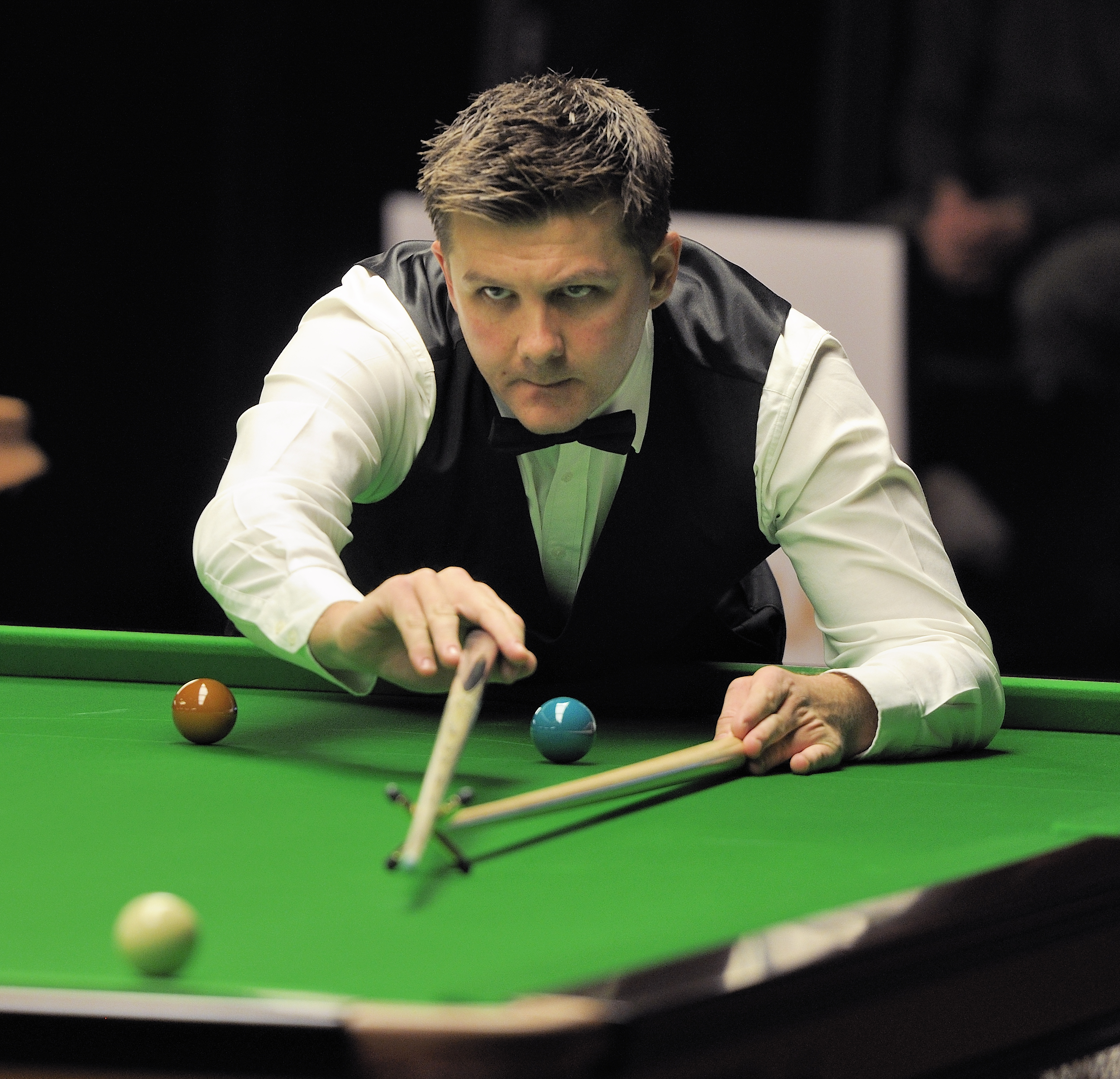
Ryan Day (pictured in 2014) was a debutant at the Crucible and lost to John Higgins in the deciding frame having led 9–7.

Day and Maguire were the only debutants at the Crucible and both lost in the opening round. Day made three century breaks in his match, the first to do so on his debut at the World Championship. He put himself 9–7 ahead with breaks of 111, 68, 54, 128, 60, 112, 71 and 57 over the 1998 champion John Higgins. Higgins, however, forced a decider with a 68 and took the match with a result of 68–50 in the last frame. Maguire, who was 23 and the youngest of the 32 players who made it to this stage of the tournament, reached the main draw after a season in which he had won his first ranking tournament defeating White in the European Open final. Facing the 2001 champion Ronnie O'Sullivan in the first round, Maguire made a 121 clearance to go 3–2 ahead and had a chance to double the lead in the next frame, but he ended up losing 6–10 in a match that featured a combined three centuries between both players. O'Sullivan made gestures using "middle and index fingers" and "rubbing motions" that "could have been interpreted as offensive" according to snooker commentator and historian Clive Everton. O'Sullivan also conceded a frame while he could still mathematically win, something "widely regarded as inappropriate". Small was 1–7 down to fellow Scotsman Alan McManus when he was forced to retire from the match due to issues with his eyes arising from a treatment for a degenerative spinal disease, a condition which would later force him to retire from the game permanently. McManus said after the match that he was "dumbstruck" by his rival pulling out. Carter, taking part in his second consecutive first-round match of the World Championship after having made his debut the previous season, faced David Gray, who overcame a "nightmare start" and made two consecutive half-centuries in the last two frames to secure victory with a result of 10–7.

Joe Perry and Milkins, who were playing in the main stage for the fourth and third time respectively, met in the opening round. Although Perry came out 6–3 on top at the end of the first session, Milkins reduced the deficit to two frames. Perry then won three frames to put himself one away from victory at 9–4. Milkins, however, replied with breaks of up to 51 and 65, and Perry said he was beginning to "worry" when it got to 9–7, but managed to close out the match. In a tactical match, Matthew Stevens, a finalist in 2000, overcame a two-frame deficit against Wattana and won the last five frames to advance into the second round. Paul Hunter, who had lost the Players Championship final against White two weeks earlier, took a 5–4 lead against 1991 world champion Parrott, who could have levelled the match at 7–7, but missed a pot. Hunter went on to win 10–7. Seven-time champion Stephen Hendry raced into an 8–1 lead against Pettman in the first session, and wrapped up the match with two more frames once the match was resumed, with a 117 century. In a match that only featured six breaks over fifty, Graeme Dott defeated King in the decider 10–9. "It was actually getting embarrassing how bad the game was," he said afterwards.

=== Second round ===
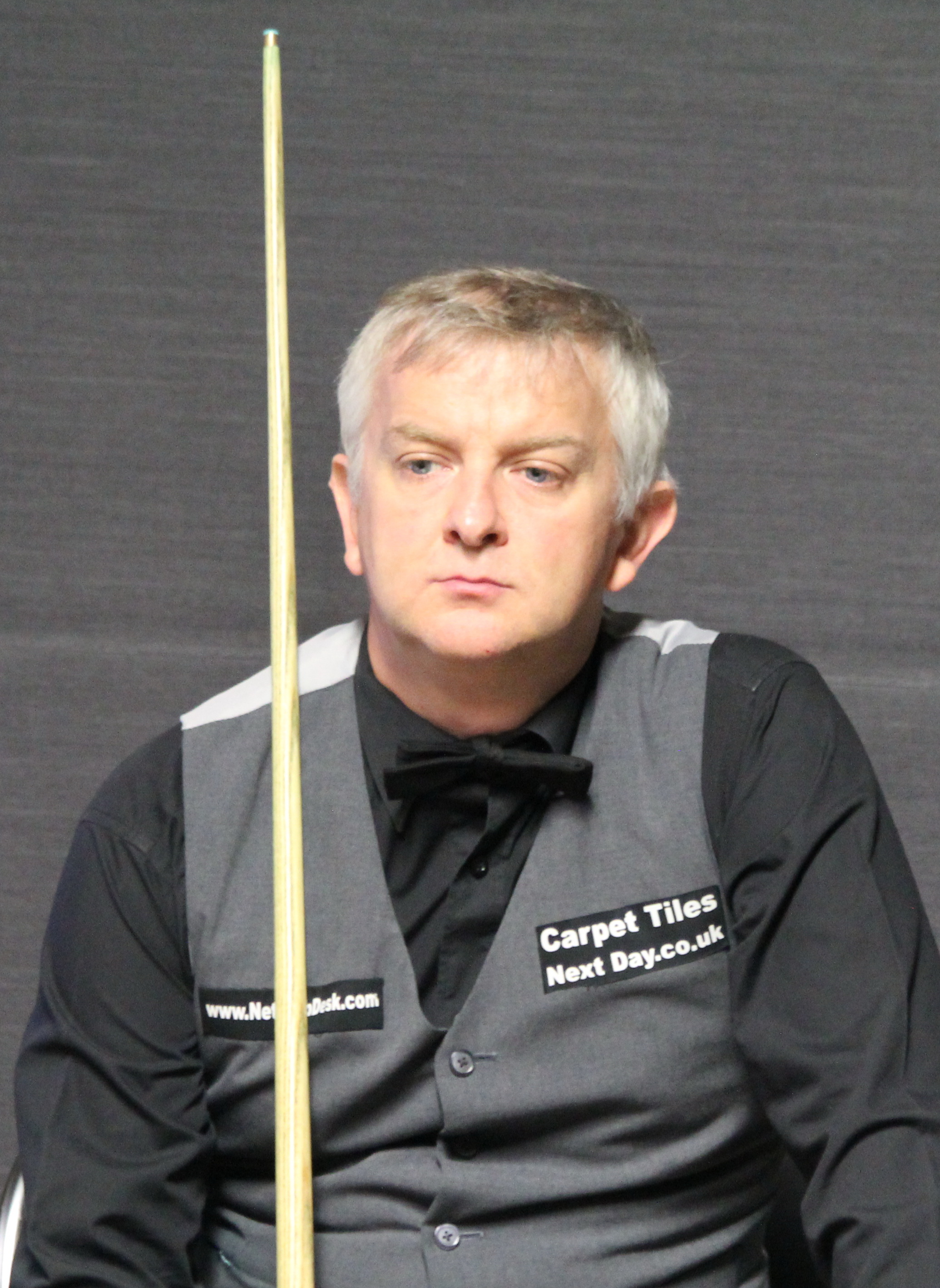
Barry Pinches (pictured in 2016) had never played in the second round before. He led seven-time champion Stephen Hendry 11–9, but ended up losing 12–13.

The second round of the event was played as the best of 25 frames, held over three sessions, between 22 and 26 April. Pinches, playing in this stage of the tournament for the first time, led Hendry 11–9 before losing 12–13. Hendry regarded the match as one of the toughest "battles" he had had to endure at the Crucible. Hunter and Stevens met in the last 16 for the second consecutive year. Stevens had been defeated 6–13 the previous year, and found himself two frames behind at 10–12 before Hunter missed a pink ball in the 23rd frame which would have given him the match. Stevens took all three remaining frames to win the match 13–12. Perry made a break of 145 in his match against the defending champion Williams, which remained as the highest break of the tournament. Having manufactured a 10–6 lead, Perry lost five frames on the trot and let Williams in front for the first time in the match at 10–11. Perry put together breaks of 55, 53 and 82 to win 13–11 and advance into the quarter-finals of the World Championship for the first time in his career. Gray took victory over Walker with a result of 13–5 and also made his first appearance in the quarter-finals. "It was not my greatest performance," Gray highlighted despite the result and urged himself to score more heavily the next day.

Dott got off to a good start in his match against Higgins and established a 5–1 advantage that got reduced to 5–3 by the end of the first session. Going into the last session, Dott led 12–7 before Higgins made breaks of 89 and 130 and won another one to reduce the deficit to only a couple of frames. Dott won the match with a 62 break, and said he had "never seen John [Higgins] play as badly as that". O'Sullivan faced 1995 semi-finalist Hicks, who had not managed to get past the first round of the event since that year. Scores were level going into the final session, but O'Sullivan won a match in which he compiled five century breaks. Both players conceded frames while the other was still at the table. Hamilton shared the first two sessions with Swail and they were tied at 8–8. Swail had until that point scored half-centuries for every frame that had gone his way, but could not hold Hamilton, who sealed victory by 13–11 with breaks of 86 and 61. McManus won the first frame against McCulloch, who then took seven in a row with breaks of 106, 64, 76, 62, 113, 82 and 84, and moved within two of victory ahead of the evening session. They played only three frames in the third session as McCulloch progressed to the quarter-finals for the first time in his career.

=== Quarter-finals ===
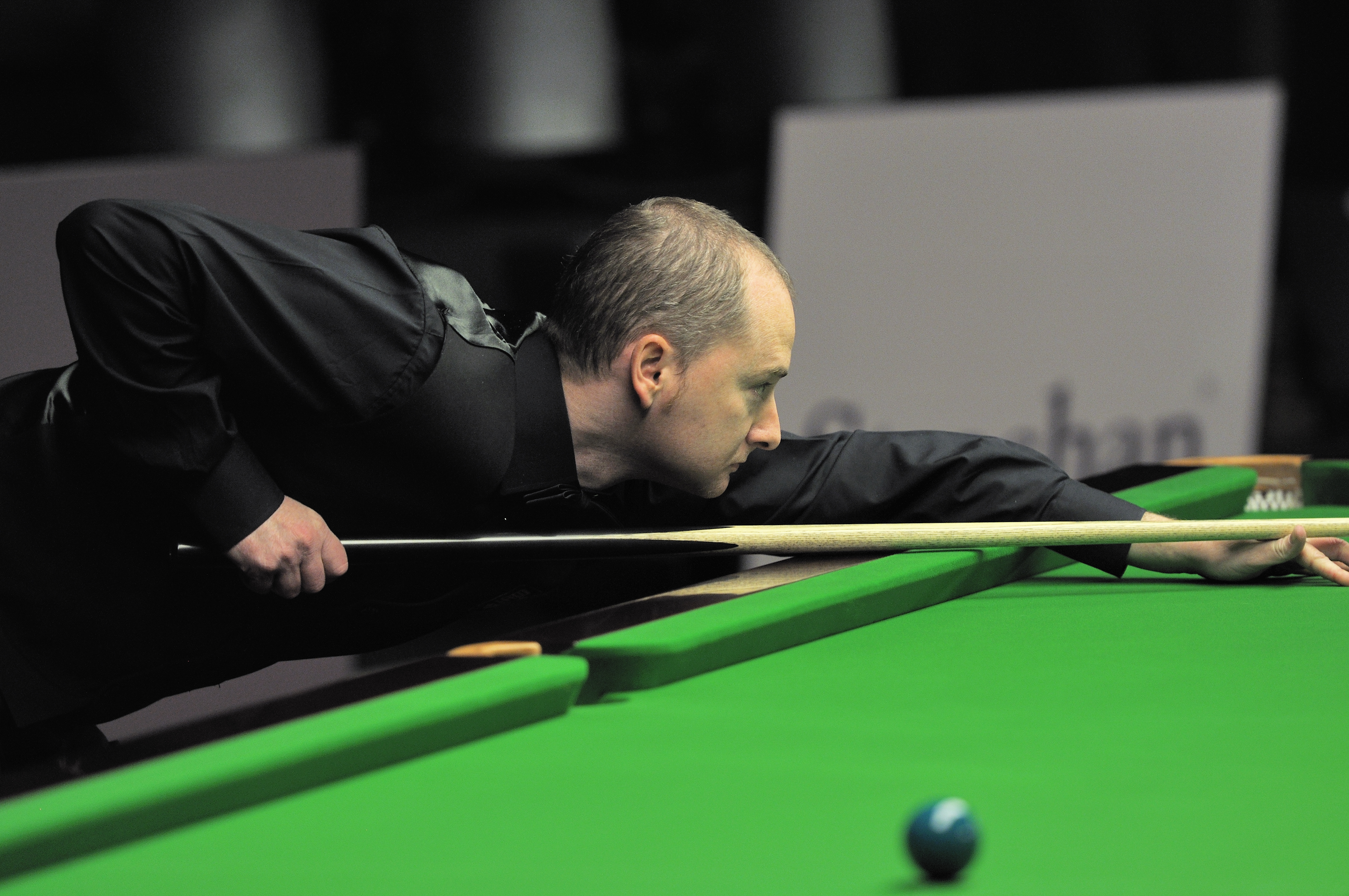
Graeme Dott (pictured in 2014) reached the semi-finals for the first time, defeating David Gray 13–7.

The quarter-finals were played as the best of 25 frames held over three sessions, on 27 and 28 April. In his match against O'Sullivan, Hamilton lost seven of the first eight frames and eventually lost the match 3–13. O'Sullivan compiled four centuries of 109, 106, 131 and 121 in the match. O'Sullivan's match was regarded by snooker reporter Clive Everton writing for The Guardian as a "performance of stunning virtuosity". Hendry defeated McCulloch also 13–3 with a session to spare. In setting up a semi-final duel with O'Sullivan, he made two centuries and nine half-centuries.

Perry, contesting his first ever quarter-final, was six frames behind Stevens at the beginning of the third session at 5–11, but he won five frames to trail 10–12. He stated, however, he was "mentally tired" after his second-round match against Williams and that he had lost the match "at the start". Stevens eventually won 13–10. "It's difficult when you have a big lead like that and then someone fights back, because it really puts the pressure on you," pointed out Stevens. Dott had never reached this stage of the tournament before either, and displayed what he thought was "a rubbish game", but defeated Gray 13–7, closing out the match with a break of 62. "You watch the Crucible when it gets to one table as a kid, and wonder what it would be like to play there," he said afterwards.

=== Semi-finals ===
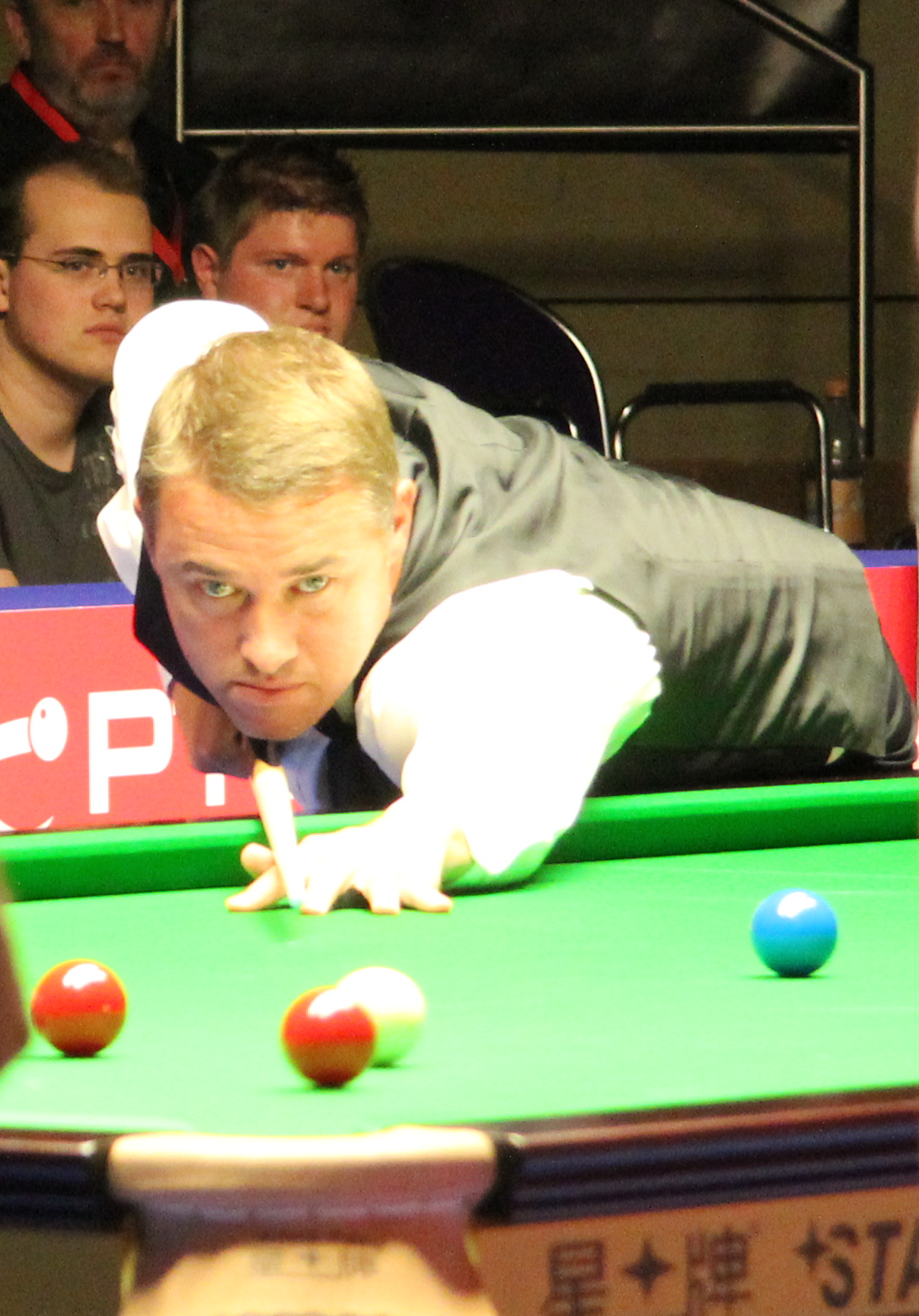
Stephen Hendry (pictured in 2011) suffered a 4–17 defeat against Ronnie O'Sullivan, the biggest in history for a World Championship semi-final match.

The semi-finals were played as the best of 33 frames, held over four sessions, between 29 April and 1 May. Hendry and O'Sullivan were meeting in the semi-finals stage for the third time, with Hendry winning 17–13 in both 1999 and 2002. Several breaks over 80 and a 117 gave O'Sullivan a clear advantage over Hendry in the two first sessions, where he led 6–2 and 13–3, respectively. The match ended 17–4 and with a session to spare, thanks to breaks of 93 and 79 by O'Sullivan, whose victory against Hendry was the biggest ever for a semi-final of the tournament. The previous largest was Hendry's 16–4 win over Terry Griffiths in 1992.

In the other semi-final, Dott faced Stevens. Stevens had previously reached this stage of the tournament on four occasions, whilst it was Dott's first time. Dott was also required to reach the final to retain his place in the top 16 in the world rankings. The pair shared the first session 4–4, but Dott gained a 9–7 lead after the second. Dott displayed good safety throughout the rest of the match to lead 15–12. Although Stevens won frames 28, 29 and 30 to level the match at 15–15, Dott won the next two, including one on the final pink ball, to reach the final.

=== Final ===
The final of the event was played on 2 and 3 May as a best-of-35-frames match, held over four sessions, between Dott and O'Sullivan. Referee Paul Collier took charge of his first World Championship final. O'Sullivan (seeded third) was contesting his second World Championship final, having won his previous one in 2001 against Higgins, while it was the first one for Dott (seeded thirteenth). Dott had till that point reached two ranking finals—those of the 1999 Scottish Open and the 2001 British Open—but had come short to both Hendry and Higgins. Dott made a strong start to the match and compiled breaks of 71, 77, 64 and 60 to move 5–0 clear, but O'Sullivan responded with a 100-point century break and then won two more to put himself only two behind at the end of the first session. In the second session, played in the evening, O'Sullivan moved from two frames down to two ahead by the conclusion, and in the third session the following afternoon he won all frames save one—in which Dott compiled a 106 century. O'Sullivan only needed two frames and twenty minutes in the evening to seal his second world title.

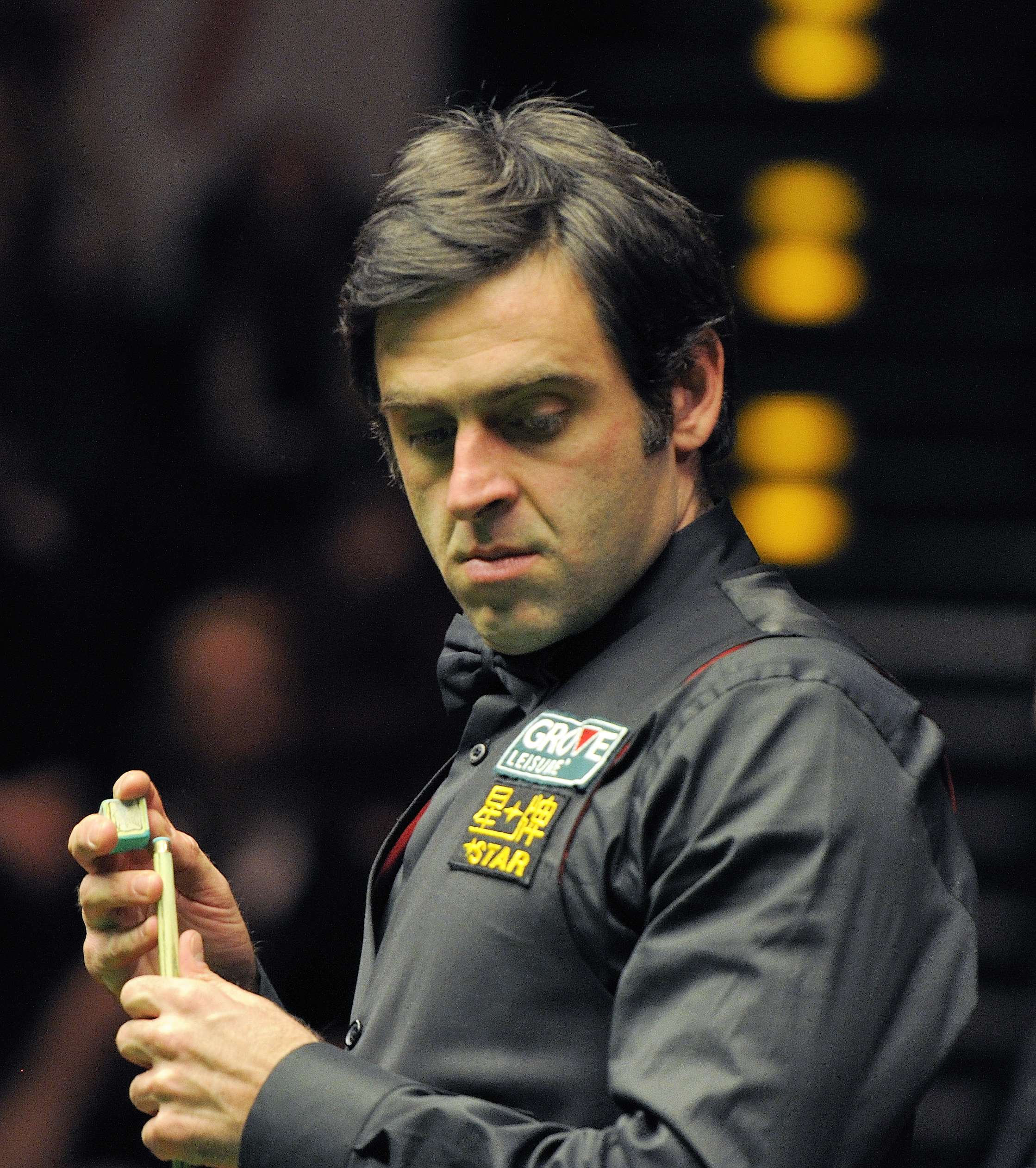
Ronnie O'Sullivan (pictured in 2012) won his second World Championship, defeating Dott 18–8 in the final.

O'Sullivan won the match 18–8, the biggest margin in a World final since Hendry's 18–5 victory over White in 1993 and the fourth largest in the history of the tournament, subsequently equalled by O'Sullivan himself against Carter in 2008 and Kyren Wilson in 2020. Afterwards, Dott conceded that the newly crowned champion could be regarded as "the greatest of all time" and expressed elation over having avoided losing the final with a session to spare. "It could have been worse," he stated in the post-match interview. O'Sullivan said he had felt at all times throughout the seventeen days that he would go on to win the tournament and thanked six-time world champion Ray Reardon for his advice, for he had recently begun to work alongside him on improving his overall game. He dedicated the victory to his father, who was in prison at the time, and said there was "more to come".

== Main draw ==
The draw for the main tournament is shown below. The numbers in parentheses after the players' names denote the seedings for the 16 seeded players (1–16). The match winners are shown in bold.

**First round** Best of 19 frames
17 April
(Wales) **Mark Williams (1)**	**10**
(Wales) Dominic Dale	7
18 & 19 April
(England) **Joe Perry (16)**	**10**
(England) Robert Milkins	7
17 & 18 April
(Wales) **Matthew Stevens (9)**	**10**
(Thailand) James Wattana	7
21 & 22 April
(England) **Paul Hunter (8)**	**10**
(England) John Parrott	7
20 April
(England) Stephen Lee (5)	7
(Wales) **Lee Walker**	**10**
21 April
(England) **David Gray (12)**	**10**
(England) Ali Carter	7
19 & 20 April
(Scotland) **Graeme Dott (13)**	**10**
(England) Mark King	9
18 & 19 April
(Scotland) **John Higgins (4)**	**10**
(Wales) Ryan Day	9
20 & 21 April
(England) **Ronnie O'Sullivan (3)**	**10**
(Scotland) Stephen Maguire	6
17 & 18 April
(Australia) Quinten Hann (14)	4
(England) **Andy Hicks**	**10**
21 & 22 April
(England) Steve Davis (11)	7
(England) **Anthony Hamilton**	**10**
17 & 18 April
(Republic of Ireland) Ken Doherty (6)	5
(Northern Ireland) **Joe Swail**	**10**
19 April
(England) Peter Ebdon (7)	8
(England) **Ian McCulloch**	**10**
17 & 18 April
(Scotland) **Alan McManus (10)**	**7** (Note: Small retired after the first session with a spinal issue.)
(Scotland) Chris Small	1
19 & 20 April
(England) Jimmy White (15)	8
(England) **Barry Pinches**	**10**
20 & 21 April
(Scotland) **Stephen Hendry (2)**	**10**
(England) Stuart Pettman	2

**Second round** Best of 25 frames
22, 23 & 24 April
(Wales) Mark Williams (1)	11
(England) **Joe Perry (16)**	**13**
23 & 24 April
(Wales) **Matthew Stevens (9)**	**13**
(England) Paul Hunter (8)	12
24, 25 & 26 April
(Wales) Lee Walker	5
(England) **David Gray (12)**	**13**
25 & 26 April
(Scotland) **Graeme Dott (13)**	**13**
(Scotland) John Higgins (4)	10
22 & 23 April
(England) **Ronnie O'Sullivan (3)**	**13**
(England) Andy Hicks	11
23 & 24 April
(England) **Anthony Hamilton**	**13**
(Northern Ireland) Joe Swail	11
25 & 26 April
(England) **Ian McCulloch**	**13**
(Scotland) Alan McManus (10)	6
24, 25 & 26 April
(England) Barry Pinches	12
(Scotland) **Stephen Hendry (2)**	**13**

**Quarter-finals**; Best of 25 frames
27 & 28 April
(England) Joe Perry (16)	10
(Wales) **Matthew Stevens (9)**	**13**
27 & 28 April
(England) David Gray (12)	7
(Scotland) **Graeme Dott (13)**	**13**
27 April
(England) **Ronnie O'Sullivan (3)**	**13**
(England) Anthony Hamilton	3
27 & 28 April
(England) Ian McCulloch	3
(Scotland) **Stephen Hendry (2)**	**13**

**Semi-finals**; Best of 33 frames
29, 30 April & 1 May
(Wales) Matthew Stevens (9)	15
(Scotland) **Graeme Dott (13)**	**17**
29, 30 April & 1 May
(England) **Ronnie O'Sullivan (3)**	**17**
(Scotland) Stephen Hendry (2)	4

**Final**; Best of 35 frames
2 & 3 May
(Scotland) Graeme Dott (13)	8
(England) **Ronnie O'Sullivan (3)**	**18**

=== Final: frame scores ===
Final: (Best of 35 frames) Crucible Theatre, Sheffield, 2 & 3 May 2004; Referee: Paul Collier
Graeme Dott (13); Scotland				8–**18**			**Ronnie O'Sullivan** (3); England			
Session 1: **5**–3 (**5**–3)
Frame	1	2	3	4	5	6	7	8	9	10
Dott	**71**† (71)	**77**† (77)	**108**† (64)	**97**†	**61**† (60)	0	17	0	N/A	N/A
O'Sullivan	34	9	0	0	0	**100**† (100)	**63**†	**87**† (63)	N/A	N/A
Session 2: 2–**6** (7–**9**)
Frame	1	2	3	4	5	6	7	8	9	10
Dott	0	**59**†	47	0	**87**† (86)	48	1	0	N/A	N/A
O'Sullivan	**87**† (56)	0	**64**†	**78**† (78)	0	**68**† (56)	**68**†	**69**†	N/A	N/A
Session 3: 1–**7** (8–**16**)
Frame	1	2	3	4	5	6	7	8	9	10
Dott	1	0	**119**† (106)	30	43	8	44	13	N/A	N/A
O'Sullivan	**71**†	**85**†	2	**76**† (65)	**85**† (85)	**69**† (62)	**91**†	**72**† (61)	N/A	N/A
Session 4: 0–**2** (8–**18**)
Frame	1	2	3	4	5	6	7	8	9	10
Dott	8	16	N/A	N/A	N/A	N/A	N/A	N/A	N/A	N/A
O'Sullivan	**92**† (92)	**88**†	N/A	N/A	N/A	N/A	N/A	N/A	N/A	N/A
(frame 19) **106**				Highest break			100 (frame 6)			
1				Century breaks			1			
6				50+ breaks			**10**			
(England) Ronnie O'Sullivan wins the 2004 World Snooker Championship † = Winner of frame

== Qualifying results ==
The qualifying competition was held in three stages at Pontin's, Prestatyn Sands. The first stage, for amateurs and non-Tour professionals, was played at Pontin's, Prestatyn Sands, on 11 January. In stage two, from 12 to 17 January, Challenge Tour Professionals joined the draw. Results for stage three, played between 10 and 20 February, and then on 16 and 17 March, are shown below.

Round 1 Best of 19 frames
Brian Salmon (ENG)	10
Chris Melling (ENG)	9
Ian Preece (WAL)	10
Justin Astley (ENG)	8
Mike Hallett (ENG)	10
James Leadbetter (ENG)	6
Mehmet Husnu (CYP)	10
Craig MacGillivray (SCO)	2
Joe Delaney (IRL)	10
Rodney Goggins (IRL)	6
Adrian Rosa (ENG)	10
Steve James (ENG)	6
Adam Davies (ENG)	10
David Hall (ENG)	8

Round 2 Best of 19 frames
Tom Ford (ENG)	10
Martin Gould (ENG)	8
Craig Butler (ENG)	10
Brian Salmon (ENG)	9
Luke Simmonds (ENG)	10
Matthew Couch (ENG)	8
Ian Preece (WAL)	9
Joe Johnson (ENG)	0 (Note: Johnson conceded the match at 0–9.)
Lee Walker (WAL)	10
Mike Hallett (ENG)	6
Gary Thomson (SCO)	10
Luke Fisher (ENG)	2
Peter Lines (ENG)	10
Ian Brumby (ENG)	4
Dave Gilbert (ENG)	10
Michael Wild (ENG)	6
Rory McLeod (ENG)	10
Mehmet Husnu (CYP)	7
Jason Prince (NIR)	10
Darryn Walker (ENG)	6
Joe Delaney (IRL)	10
Andrew Higginson (ENG)	4
Neil Robertson (AUS)	10
Martin Dziewialtowski (SCO)	8
Simon Bedford (ENG)	10
Ian Sargeant (WAL)	5
Liu Song (CHN)	10
Wayne Brown (ENG)	5
Leo Fernandez (IRL)	10
Paul Sweeny (ENG)	9
Michael Rhodes (ENG)	10
Terry Murphy (NIR)	9
Kwan Poomjang (THA)	10
Philip Williams (WAL)	9
Garry Hardiman (ENG)	10
Billy Snaddon (SCO)	6
Munraj Pal (ENG)	10
Andy Neck (ENG)	0
Colm Gilcreest (IRL)	10
Steven Bennie (SCO)	7
Ryan Day (WAL)	10
Adrian Rosa (ENG)	7
Tony Jones (ENG)	10
Adam Davies (ENG)	3
Jason Ferguson (ENG)	10
Carlo Giagnacovo (ENG)	9
Ricky Walden (ENG)	10
Stephen Croft (ENG)	0
Joe Meara (NIR)	10
Andrew Norman (ENG)	8
Adrian Gunnell (ENG)	10
Steve Mifsud (AUS)	5
Ding Junhui (CHN)	10
Atthasit Mahitthi (THA)	6
Paul Davies (WAL)	10
Alain Robidoux (CAN)	4
Supoj Saenla (THA)	10
Bradley Jones (ENG)	8
Paul Wykes (ENG)	10
Kurt Maflin (NOR)	4
Stuart Mann (ENG)	10
Jamie Cope (ENG)	8
Scott MacKenzie (SCO)	10
Johl Younger (AUS)	3

Round 3 Best of 19 frames
Tom Ford (ENG)	4
Craig Butler (ENG)	10
Luke Simmonds (ENG)	5
Ian Preece (WAL)	10
Lee Walker (WAL)	10
Gary Thomson (SCO)	6
Peter Lines (ENG)	10
Dave Gilbert (ENG)	6
Rory McLeod (ENG)	10
Jason Prince (ENG)	3
Joe Delaney (IRL)	2
Neil Robertson (AUS)	10
Simon Bedford (ENG)	10
Liu Song (CHN)	6
Leo Fernandez (IRL)	10
Michael Rhodes (ENG)	5
Kwan Poomjang (THA)	7
Garry Hardiman (ENG)	10
Munraj Pal (ENG)	10
Colm Gilcreest (IRL)	5
Ryan Day (WAL)	10
Tony Jones (ENG)	0
Jason Ferguson (ENG)	4
Ricky Walden (ENG)	10
Joe Meara (NIR)	5
Adrian Gunnell (ENG)	10
Ding Junhui (CHN)	10
Paul Davies (WAL)	5
Supoj Saenla (THA)	8
Paul Wykes (ENG)	10
Stuart Mann (ENG)	10
Scott MacKenzie (SCO)	2

Round 4 Best of 19 frames
Darren Morgan (WAL)	10
Craig Butler (ENG)	8
David Finbow (ENG)	10
Ian Preece (WAL)	9
Lee Walker (WAL)	10
Alfie Burden (ENG)	7
Peter Lines (ENG)	10
Nick Walker (ENG)	4
Rory McLeod (ENG)	10
Bjorn Haneveer (BEL)	5
Neil Robertson (AUS)	10
Rod Lawler (ENG)	4
Andy Hicks (ENG)	10
Simon Bedford (ENG)	7
Leo Fernandez (IRL)	10
Sean Storey (ENG)	8
Shokat Ali (PAK)	10
Garry Hardiman (ENG)	4
Nick Dyson (ENG)	10
Munraj Pal (ENG)	9
Ryan Day (WAL)	10
Mike Dunn (ENG)	7
David Roe (ENG)	10
Ricky Walden (ENG)	5
Adrian Gunnell (ENG)	10
Jimmy Michie (ENG)	5
Ding Junhui (CHN)	10
Marcus Campbell (SCO)	3
Patrick Wallace (NIR)	10
Paul Wykes (ENG)	4
Shaun Murphy (ENG)	10
Stuart Mann (ENG)	5

Round 5 Best of 19 frames
James Wattana (THA)	10
Darren Morgan (WAL)	1
Brian Morgan (ENG)	10
David Finbow (ENG)	9
Lee Walker (WAL)	10
Barry Hawkins (ENG)	8
Nigel Bond (ENG)	10
Peter Lines (ENG)	6
Rory McLeod (ENG)	10
Stuart Bingham (ENG)	6
Stephen Maguire (SCO)	10
Neil Robertson (AUS)	6
Andy Hicks (ENG)	10
Jamie Burnett (SCO)	4
Leo Fernandez (IRL)	10
Gerard Greene (NIR)	9
Michael Holt (ENG)	10
Shokat Ali (PAK)	6
Nick Dyson (ENG)	10
Gary Wilkinson (ENG)	4
Ryan Day (WAL)	10
Mark Davis (ENG)	6
Michael Judge (IRL)	10
David Roe (ENG)	9
Adrian Gunnell (ENG)	10
Fergal O'Brien (IRL)	7
Barry Pinches (ENG)	10
Ding Junhui (CHN)	7
Patrick Wallace (NIR)	10
Jonathan Birch (ENG)	5
Stuart Pettman (ENG)	10
Shaun Murphy (ENG)	7

Round 6 Best of 19 frames
James Wattana (THA)	10
Dave Harold (ENG)	8
Joe Swail (NIR)	10
Brian Morgan (ENG)	3
Lee Walker (WAL)	10
Mark Selby (ENG)	2
Ian McCulloch (ENG)	10
Nigel Bond (ENG)	7
Robert Milkins (ENG)	10
Rory McLeod (ENG)	1
Stephen Maguire (SCO)	w/o
Robin Hull (FIN)	w/d
Andy Hicks (ENG)	10
Anthony Davies (WAL)	8
Dominic Dale (WAL)	10
Leo Fernandez (IRL)	8
Anthony Hamilton (ENG)	10
Michael Holt (ENG)	9
Ali Carter (ENG)	10
Nick Dyson (ENG)	6
Ryan Day (WAL)	10
Drew Henry (SCO)	7
John Parrott (ENG)	10
Michael Judge (IRL)	9
Mark King (ENG)	10
Adrian Gunnell (ENG)	8
Barry Pinches (ENG)	10
Tony Drago (MLT)	2
Chris Small (SCO)	10
Patrick Wallace (NIR)	7
Stuart Pettman (ENG)	10
Marco Fu (HKG)	7

Note: w/o = walkover; w/d = withdrawn

== Century breaks ==
A total of 55 century breaks were made during the main stage of the tournament. The highest break of the tournament was a 145 made by Joe Perry.

- 145, 100 – Joe Perry
- 132, 125, 102 – Paul Hunter
- 131, 130 – John Higgins
- 131, 127, 127, 125, 123, 121, 117, 109, 109, 106, 106, 101, 100 – Ronnie O'Sullivan
- 128, 125, 122, 115, 113, 111, 109, 104 – Matthew Stevens
- 128, 112, 111 – Ryan Day
- 127, 119 – Steve Davis
- 127, 110 – Joe Swail
- 121, 112 – Stephen Maguire
- 120 – Jimmy White
- 117, 113, 108, 106 – Ian McCulloch
- 117, 110, 103 – Stephen Hendry
- 117, 106 – Graeme Dott
- 116 – Andy Hicks
- 115, 111 – Barry Pinches
- 109 – James Wattana
- 108, 105 – Mark Williams
- 103 – Alan McManus
- 100 – David Gray
