= 2004–05 snooker world rankings =

No. 1: Ronnie O'Sullivan
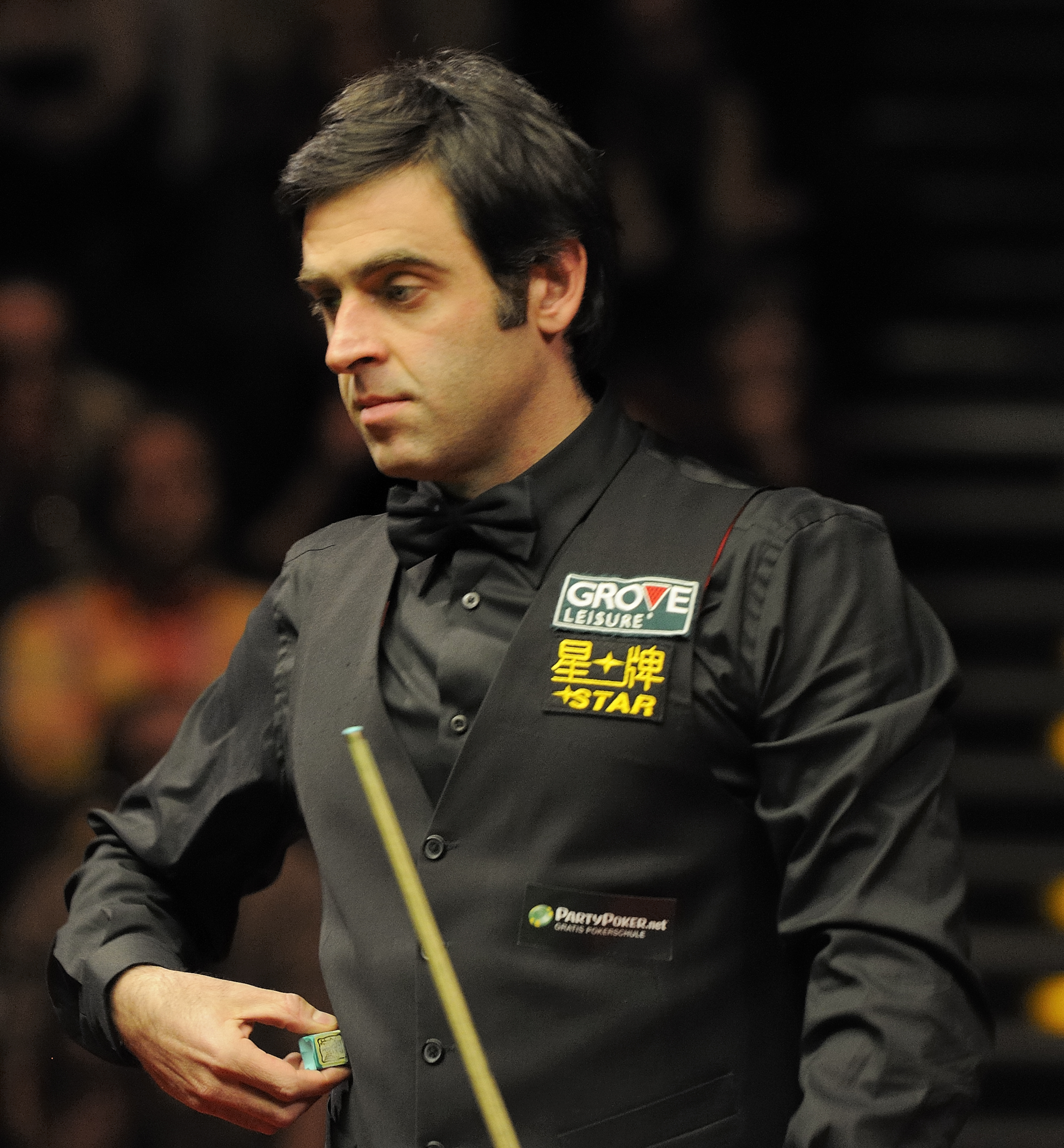

Personal information
- Born: December 5, 1975 (age 50)

Sport
- Country: England
- Sport: Snooker
- Professional: 1992–present
- Highest ranking: 1

Preceded by 2003–04	2004–05	Succeeded by 2005–06

2004–05 snooker world rankings: The professional world rankings for the top 64 snooker players in the 2004‍–‍05 season are listed below. This was Chris Small's only season in the top 16, and Paul Hunter's only appearance in the top 4.

No. 2: Mark Williams
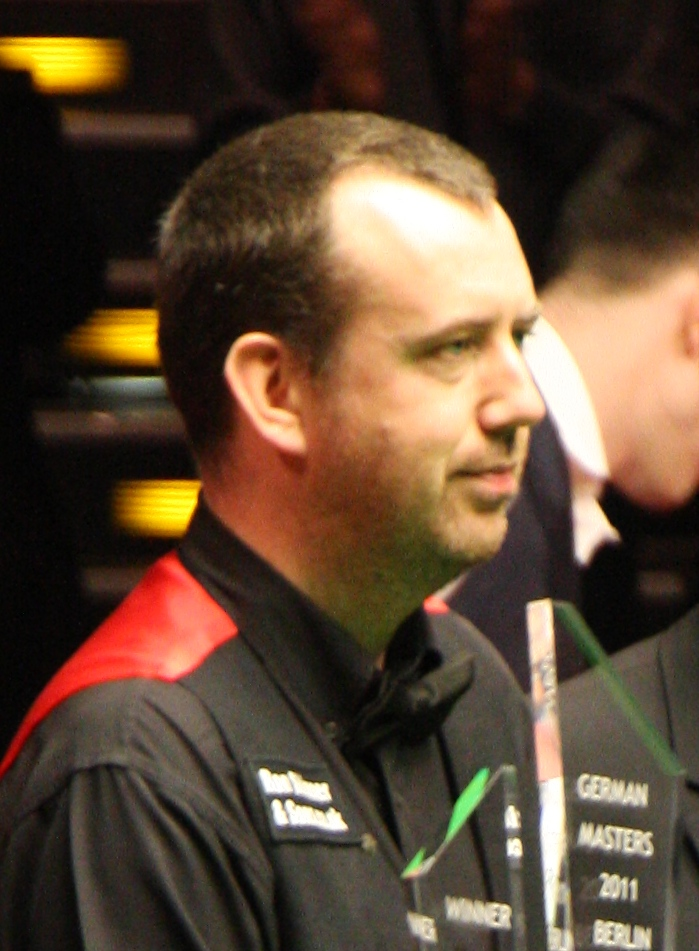

Personal information
- Born: March 21, 1975 (age 51)

Sport
- Country: Wales
- Sport: Snooker
- Professional: 1992–present
- Highest ranking: 1

No. 3: Stephen Hendry
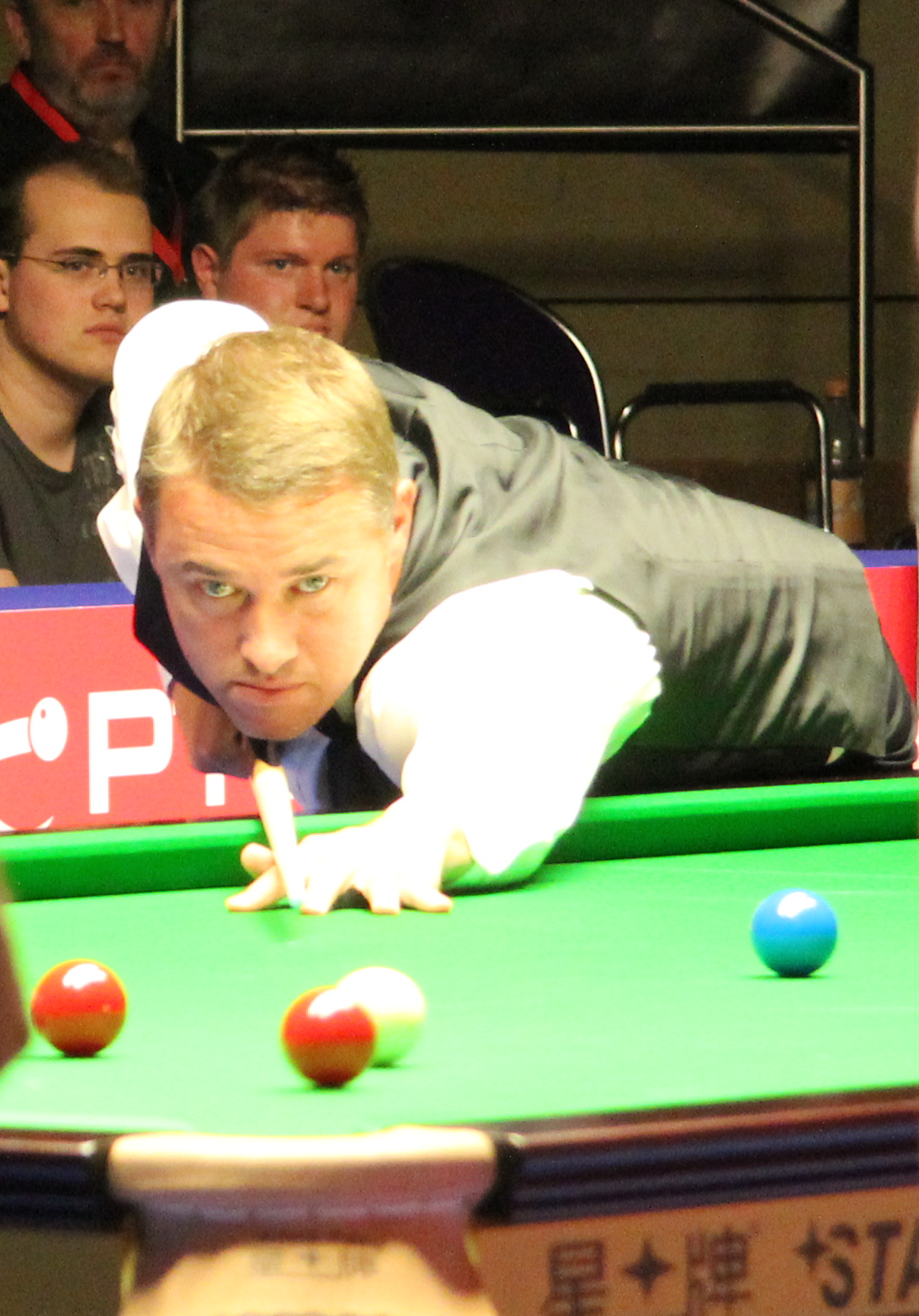

Personal information
- Born: January 13, 1969 (age 57)

Sport
- Country: Scotland
- Sport: Snooker
- Professional: 1985–2012, 2020–2024
- Highest ranking: 1

No.	Name	Nationality	Points
1	Ronnie O'Sullivan	England	46775
2	Mark Williams	Wales	44462
3	Stephen Hendry	Scotland	40950
4	Paul Hunter	England	40375
5	John Higgins	Scotland	36487
6	Matthew Stevens	Wales	33325
7	Ken Doherty	Ireland	32212
8	Peter Ebdon	England	31550
9	Stephen Lee	England	30700
10	Alan McManus	Scotland	29250
11	Jimmy White	England	28137
12	Chris Small	Scotland	27550
13	Steve Davis	England	27087
14	David Gray	England	26912
15	Graeme Dott	Scotland	26312
16	Marco Fu	Hong Kong	26212
17	Ian McCulloch	England	25350
18	Quinten Hann	Australia	25312
19	Ali Carter	England	24850
20	Joe Perry	England	24837
21	Barry Pinches	England	23750
22	Tony Drago	Malta	23675
23	Mark King	England	23562
24	Stephen Maguire	Scotland	23050
25	Anthony Hamilton	England	22974
26	Gerard Greene	Northern Ireland	22325
27	Drew Henry	Scotland	22150
28	Robert Milkins	England	21762
29	Michael Holt	England	21600
30	Joe Swail	Northern Ireland	20999
31	John Parrott	England	20887
32	Dominic Dale	Wales	20725
33	James Wattana	Thailand	20187
34	Dave Harold	England	19275
35	Nigel Bond	England	19162
36	Mark Selby	England	19137
37	Stuart Bingham	England	18675
38	Stuart Pettman	England	17787
39	Patrick Wallace	Northern Ireland	17762
40	Mark Davis	England	17150
41	Fergal O'Brien	Ireland	17037
42	Michael Judge	Ireland	16987
43	Barry Hawkins	England	16600
44	Nick Dyson	England	16375
45	Ryan Day	Wales	16350
46	Brian Morgan	England	15950
47	Robin Hull	Finland	15887
48	Shaun Murphy	England	15187
49	Jamie Burnett	Scotland	14850
50	Sean Storey	England	14787
51	Andy Hicks	England	14762
52	David Roe	England	14237
53	Bjorn Haneveer	Belgium	14225
54	Anthony Davies	Wales	13987
55	Jimmy Michie	England	13699
56	Gary Wilkinson	England	13650
57	Rod Lawler	England	13412
58	Mike Dunn	England	13224
59	Lee Walker	Wales	13050
60	David Finbow	England	12987
61	Adrian Gunnell	England	12825
62	Nick Walker	England	12762
63	Marcus Campbell	Scotland	12600
64	Jonathan Birch	England	12050
