= Scott MacKenzie (snooker player) =

Scottish snooker player

Personal information
- Born: 21 July 1980 (age 46)

Sport
- Country: Scotland
- Sport: Snooker
- Professional: 2000/2001, 2003–2009, 2011/2012
- Highest ranking: 59 (2006/2007)
- Best ranking finish: Last 16 (x1)

Scott MacKenzie (born 21 July 1980) is a Scottish former professional snooker player who lives in Renfrewshire.

== Career ==
MacKenzie's first appearance at a ranking event came at the 2004 Daily Record Players Championship. He beat James Wattana in the final qualifying round before losing 5–1 to Marco Fu in the first round proper. He reached the last 16 of a ranking event for the first time in his career at the 2006 China Open. He won four qualifying matches to secure a place in the tournament, culminating in a 5–2 defeat of Ian McCulloch. In Beijing, he saw off wildcard Li Hang 5–2 then stunned Matthew Stevens 5–4 before losing 5–0 to eventual champion Mark Williams.

MacKenzie enjoyed a superb run in the 2006 UK Championship with wins over Dene O'Kane and Tom Ford in the qualifiers which set up a last 48 meeting with Michael Holt whom he defeated 9–0. He then played reigning world champion Graeme Dott in his first appearance in a televised match. MacKenzie's journey ended there as Dott ran out a 9–2 winner. The remainder of the season was a disappointment, however, as he was unable to repeat that run and fell three places in the rankings to world number 63.

At the 2009 World Championship MacKenzie announced that if he did not qualify for the event he would hang up his cue and retire from the game for good: "I'll try not to think about it and I'll approach it the way I would any normal tournament. [...] But I imagine if I'm sitting in the chair one frame away from getting beat and knowing it is my last ever tournament, there will be a few things swirling around my head." Mackenzie lost in the first qualifying round, 10–9 to Wayne Cooper.

His best run of form in the 2011–12 season came in qualifying for the first ranking event, the Australian Goldfields Open. He beat Stuart Carrington, Andy Hicks and Tony Drago, before losing to former world champion Ken Doherty 5–2 in the final qualifying round. MacKenzie played in 10 of the 12 minor-ranking Players Tour Championship events throughout the season reaching, but not progressing past, the last 32 on three occasions. Following his participation in the final PTC event in December, MacKenzie did not enter another tournament. He finished the season outside of the top 64 who retain their places and did not have a spot on the main tour for the 2012–13 season. MacKenzie has not played in a professional tournament since.
