= 2001 World Snooker Championship =

Professional snooker tournament

2001 Embassy World Snooker Championship
Tournament information
- Dates: 21 April – 7 May 2001
- Venue: Crucible Theatre
- City: Sheffield
- Country: England
- Organisation: WPBSA
- Format: Ranking event
- Total prize fund: £1,532,000
- Winner's share: £250,000
- Highest break: Joe Swail (NIR) (140)

Final
- Champion: Ronnie O'Sullivan (ENG)
- Runner-up: John Higgins (SCO)
- Score: 18–14

The 2001 World Snooker Championship (officially the 2001 Embassy World Snooker Championship) was a professional snooker tournament that took place from 21 April to 7 May 2001 at the Crucible Theatre in Sheffield, England. It was the 25th consecutive year that the World Snooker Championship was staged at the venue. Sponsored by cigarette brand Embassy, the tournament was the eighth and final ranking event of the 2000–01 season. The winner received £250,000 from a total prize pool of £1,532,000.

The top 16 players from the snooker world rankings were seeded through to the main stage at the Crucible. They were joined by the 16 winning players from qualifying rounds, which took place from 20 February to 4 March at the Newport Centre in Newport, Wales. Mark Williams was the defending champion, having defeated Matthew Stevens 18–16 in the final of the 2000 World Snooker Championship. He lost in a deciding frame in his second-round match against Joe Swail, becoming the 10th player to experience the so-called Crucible curse, referring to the fact that no first-time champion had retained the title since the tournament moved to the Crucible in 1977. Ronnie O'Sullivan defeated John Higgins 18–14 in the final to claim his maiden world title. The main stage of the tournament produced 53 century breaks, of which the highest was a 140 compiled by Swail.

== Background ==
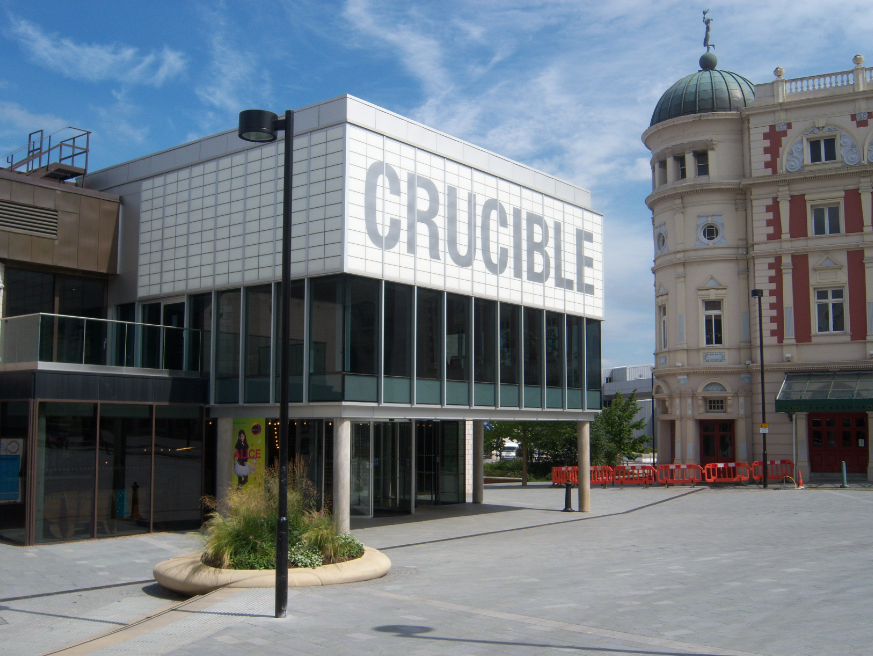
For the 24th consecutive year, the main stage of the tournament was held at the Crucible Theatre (pictured) in Sheffield, England.

The inaugural 1927 World Snooker Championship, then known as the Professional Championship of Snooker, took place at various venues in England between November 1926 and May 1927. Joe Davis won the final—held at Camkin's Hall in Birmingham from 9 to 12 May 1927—and went on to win the tournament 15 consecutive times before retiring undefeated after the 1946 edition (no tournaments were held from 1941 to 1945 because of World War II). The tournament went into abeyance after only two players contested the 1952 edition. The six editions of the World Professional Match-play Championship held between 1952 and 1957 are retroactively regarded as legitimate continuations of the World Snooker Championship, but that tournament was discontinued due to waning public interest in snooker in the post-war era. The world title was uncontested between 1958 and 1963.

Then-professional player Rex Williams was instrumental in reviving the World Snooker Championship on a challenge basis in 1964. John Pulman, winner of the 1957 World Professional Match-play Championship, defended the world title across seven challenge matches between 1964 and 1968. The World Snooker Championship reverted to an annual knockout tournament for the 1969 edition, marking the beginning of the championship's "modern era". The 1977 edition was the first staged at the Crucible Theatre in Sheffield, where it has remained since. The most successful player in the modern era was Stephen Hendry, having won the title seven times. Hendry was also the tournament's youngest winner, having captured his first title at the 1990 event, aged 21 years and 106 days. Ray Reardon became the oldest winner when he secured his sixth title at the 1978 event, aged 45 years and 203 days.

== Overview ==
The 2001 World Snooker Championship was the eighth and last ranking tournament of the 2000–01 snooker season, held after the Scottish Open. It took place from 21 April to 7 May. It was sponsored by cigarette brand Embassy. The 2001 edition marked the 25th consecutive year that the tournament was held at the Crucible and the 33rd successive year that the World Championship was contested through the modern knockout format. The defending champion was Mark Williams, who had defeated Matthew Stevens 18–16 in the final of the 2000 World Championship to win his first world title.

=== Format ===
The top 16 players in the snooker world rankings were seeded through to the main stage at the Crucible Theatre. They faced 16 players who progressed through the qualifying rounds, which took place from 20 February to 4 March at the Newport Centre in Wales. First-round matches were played as the best of 19 frames, held over two sessions. Second-round and quarter-final matches were played as the best of 25 frames, held over three sessions. The semi-final matches were played as the best of 33 frames, held over four sessions. The final was the best of 35 frames, also held over four sessions.

=== Prize fund ===
The breakdown of prize money is shown below:

- Winner: £250,000
- Runner-up: £147,000
- Semi-final: £73,000
- Quarter-final: £36,500
- Last 16: £20,000
- Last 32: £14,000
- Last 48: £10,500
- Last 64: £6,600
- Last 96: £4,000
- Last 128: £1,100
- Highest break: £20,000
- Highest pre-TV break: £2,200
- Highest pre-qualifying break: £2,200
- Maximum break: £147,000
- Total: £1,532,000

== Summary ==
=== First round ===
The first round was played between 21 and 26 April as the best of 19 frames held over two sessions. The defending champion, Mark Williams, defeated Billy Snaddon 10–4. The highest break of the match was a 69 by Williams in the last frame. Paul Hunter fell 1–4 behind David Roe, but produced breaks of 130, 60, 52, 100, 55, 108, 87 and 61 to win 10–6. Dave Harold and Quinten Hann shared the first ten frames of their match, but Harold made two half-century breaks as he won five frames in a row to clinch victory. Anthony Hamilton won 10–4 over Marcus Campbell. Tony Drago scored points in every frame save one of his match against Matthew Stevens, runner-up in the previous edition of the tournament, but lost 1–10. Peter Ebdon compiled breaks of 54, 55, 110, 55, 83, 99 and 67 as he defeated James Wattana 10–8. Andy Hicks only won two frames in his match against Ronnie O'Sullivan. Ken Doherty eliminated Nick Dyson with a 10–7 result in a contest that featured three century breaks.

Patrick Wallace produced breaks of 64, 135, 55, 69 and 52 for a 10–2 defeat of Alan McManus. Mark King manufactured a 137 break to go 8–6 in front of Fergal O'Brien. O'Brien tied the scores again at 8–8, but King won the match with two half-centuries. John Higgins established a 5–2 lead against Graeme Dott and secured a 10–4 victory making breaks of 139, 67, 136 and 80 in the process. Joe Swail took back-to-back frames against Sean Storey to force a decider, which he won. Chris Small made a century break in his 10–8 defeat of Marco Fu. Nigel Bond only won three frames in his duel with Stephen Lee. Breaks of 53, 78, 60 and 80 aided Stephen Hendry to a 10–5 win against Mark Davis.

=== Second round ===
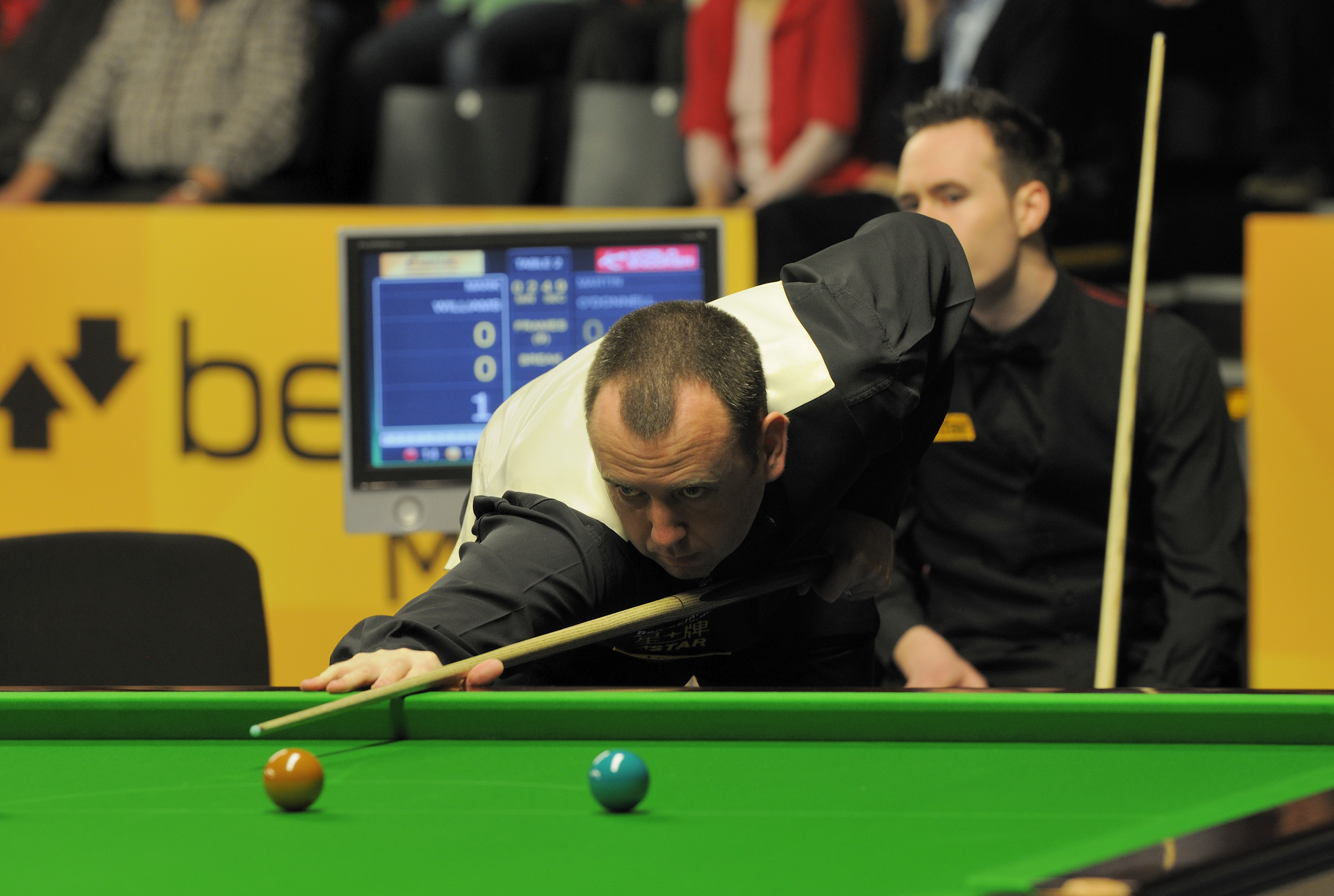
The defending champion, Mark Williams (pictured in 2013), lost 12–13 against Joe Swail and became the 10th player to experience the so-called Crucible curse, being unable to retain the title after having won it for the first time.

The second round was played as the best of 25 frames, held over three sessions, between 26 and 30 April. Stevens made a century break as he raced into a 4–0 lead against Hamilton, who won the next frame with a 114 break. Stevens made three more centuries, including a 139, to clinch a 13–5 victory. Swail made a 91 break to force a decider against Williams and won the match with another half-century. This made Williams the 10th first-time champion who failed to defend his title since the tournament moved to the Crucible Theatre in 1977, succumbing to what has been called the 'Crucible curse'. O'Sullivan made breaks of 100, 92 and 73 for a 3–1 lead against Harold. O'Sullivan went on to win 13–6, with two more centuries. Doherty won 13–7 over Judge.

Higgins made breaks of 64, 67 and 103 as he took a 6–2 lead against Small. Higgins clinched a 13–8 victory with a half-century in the last frame. King lost 5–13 to Wallace, who won two long frames that lasted 49 and 42 minutes and two consecutive frames on the final black ball. Hendry eliminated Hunter by the same margin, making breaks of 71, 129, 51, 100, 95, 54, 60, 65 and 54 in the process. Writing for The Guardian, Clive Everton praised Hendry, stating that "he hardly made a mistake in the tactical exchanges and still scored heavily enough." Lee took an early lead against Ebdon with breaks of 121 and 66. At 36 seconds per shot, Ebdon was said by Everton to have used "attritional tactics". The match went to a decider, which Ebdon won.

=== Quarter-finals ===
The quarter-finals were played as the best of 25 frames, held over three sessions, between 1 and 2 May. Stevens and Hendry shared the first two frames of their match, but Stevens then made breaks of 87, 56 and 65 to go 5–1 in front. Hendry replied with a century break, but Stevens, who recorded a 134 break, went on to win 13–5. "I was just outplayed. Matthew [Stevens] was outstanding. If his cue action isn't the best in snooker, it's very close," Hendry said. Breaks of 69 and 101 for Ebdon and of 57 and 82 for O'Sullivan meant that the first four frames of their encounter were shared. Ebdon then built a two-frame cushion, but O'Sullivan won nine consecutive frames, making breaks of 108, 67, 89, 54, 65, 50, 72, 57 and 54 in the process. O'Sullivan claimed victory with a 13–6 result. "He's the game's equivalent to Mozart—the snooker he produced was nothing short of sensational," Ebdon said of O'Sullivan.

Doherty made breaks of 114 and 91 as he took a 3–1 lead against Higgins. Higgins, who was 5–3 ahead at the end of the first session, went on to win the match 13–6, with breaks including 72, 98, 110, 139, 56, 113 and 105. In his match against Swail, Wallace built a 3–1 lead and then extended it to 6–2. Swail halved the deficit, making a 93 break along the way, and went in front for the first time at 8–7. Wallace was within one frame at 8–9, 9–10, 10–11 and 11–12, but Swail advanced into the semi-finals for a second consecutive year. "We've been practising together for about 12 years. Joe [Swail] invariably wins," Wallace said.

=== Semi-finals ===
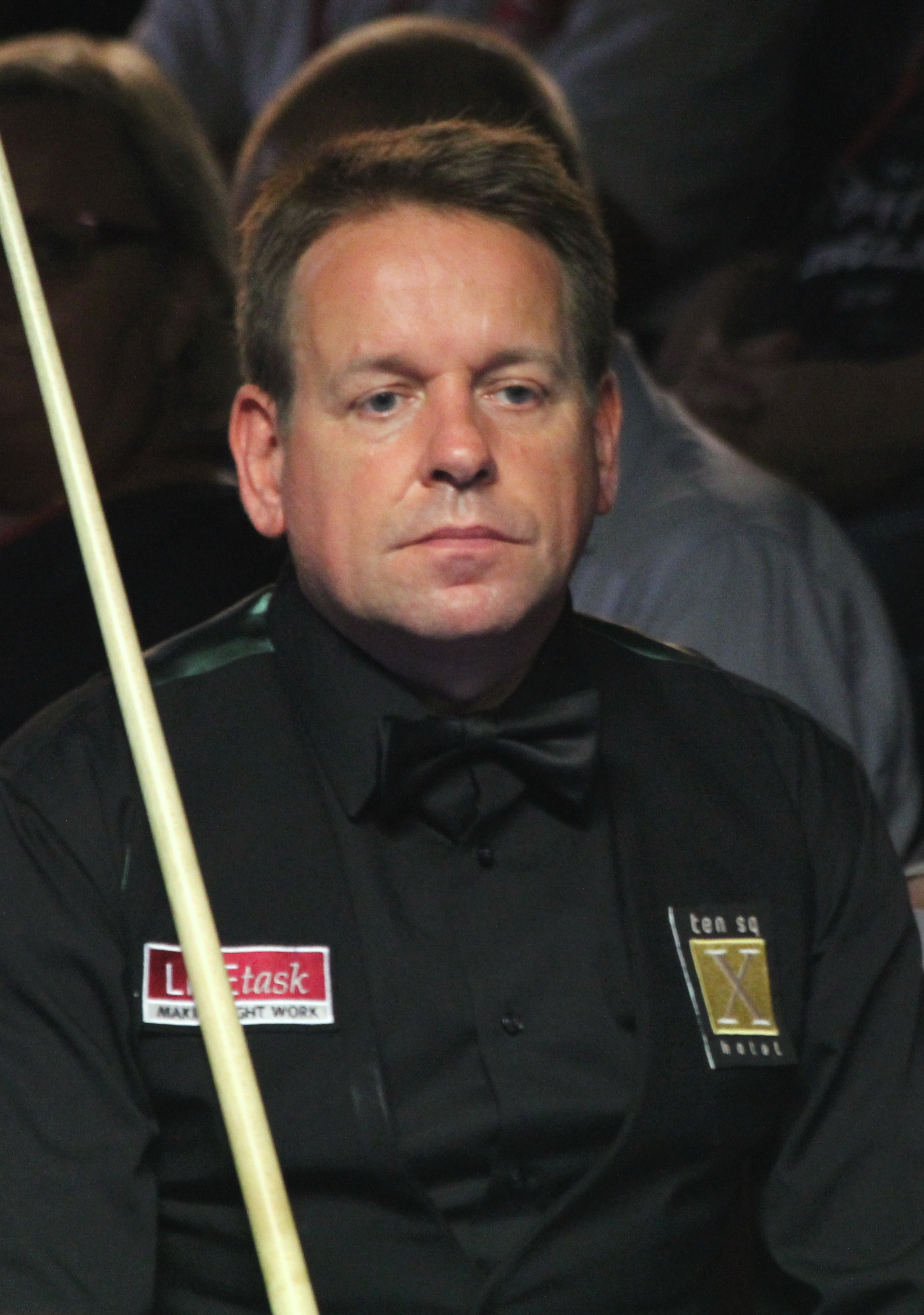
Joe Swail (pictured in 2016) reached the semi-finals of the World Championship for the second consecutive year, but lost 11–17 to Ronnie O'Sullivan.

The semi-finals were played as the best of 33 frames, held over four sessions, between 3 and 5 May. Swail faced O'Sullivan in the first semi-final. A 107 clearance gave Swail the first frame, but O'Sullivan replied with a 73 break in the second to tie the match. Swail won the third frame, but O'Sullivan then took seven in succession, featuring breaks of 62, 58, 70, 108 and 119, for an 8–2 lead. Swail reduced the deficit by winning two frames before the mid-session interval. O'Sullivan won frame thirteen. In the next, he played a long pot on the green ball and screwed back for the brown to win the frame and go 10–4 ahead. Swail replied with a 92 total clearance and also took the last of the session to edge closer at 6–10. At the resumption, Swail missed a pink that was frame ball, allowing O'Sullivan to pot both pink and black and secure the frame. He followed this with a 133 break in the next for a 12–6 advantage. Had he also potted the last black, he would have tied his rival for the highest break of the tournament, but he ran out of position. Swail won frame nineteen by two points and also had a chance in the next, but O'Sullivan took it by three points, securing a 13–7 going into the mid-session interval, four frames away from a place in the final. O'Sullivan made a 79 break to win frame 21 by two points, but Swail produced breaks of 52 and 138 to go 9–14. O'Sullivan won the last frame of the session with an 84 break. The following day, Swail followed a long pot on a red with a 114 break. O'Sullivan, miscued on his first break, however, he took frame 26. Swail reduced the deficit to five frames on the next, but O'Sullivan got a snooker and a free ball in frame 28 that allowed him to clinch victory and secure a place in the final for the first time. "I'm surprised I haven't been in the final before. When I was younger I thought I'd have won it once or twice by now," O'Sullivan said.

In the other semi-final, Stevens met Higgins, who had been eliminated at this stage both in 1999 and 2000. Higgins had a 5–3 lead at the end of the first session. Stevens won the first frame of the second session and made a 133 clearance in the next, becoming the 14th player to reach a hundred career centuries. A further half-century put him in front at 6–5. Higgins then levelled the score and won two more frames, making a 126 break in the process. Stevens was ahead at 10–8, but Higgins won back-to-back frames, making a 121 break in the process, to tie the scores. Stevens was 13–11 in front going into the final session, but Higgins won the first two frames to tie. Higgins followed with a 75 break that put him ahead, but, aided by a break of 59, Stevens tied the match once again. After the mid-session interval, Stevens took the lead in frame 29 with a 71 break, but then went in-off after potting a black, allowing Higgins a chance. A fluke on the yellow helped Stevens secure the frame. Higgins then tied the match at 15–15 and made a break of 73 to go one in front and one away from victory. Frame 32 lasted more than an hour, with a long safety exchange, but Higgins won it 70–44 to book a place in the final with a 17–15 result.

=== Final ===
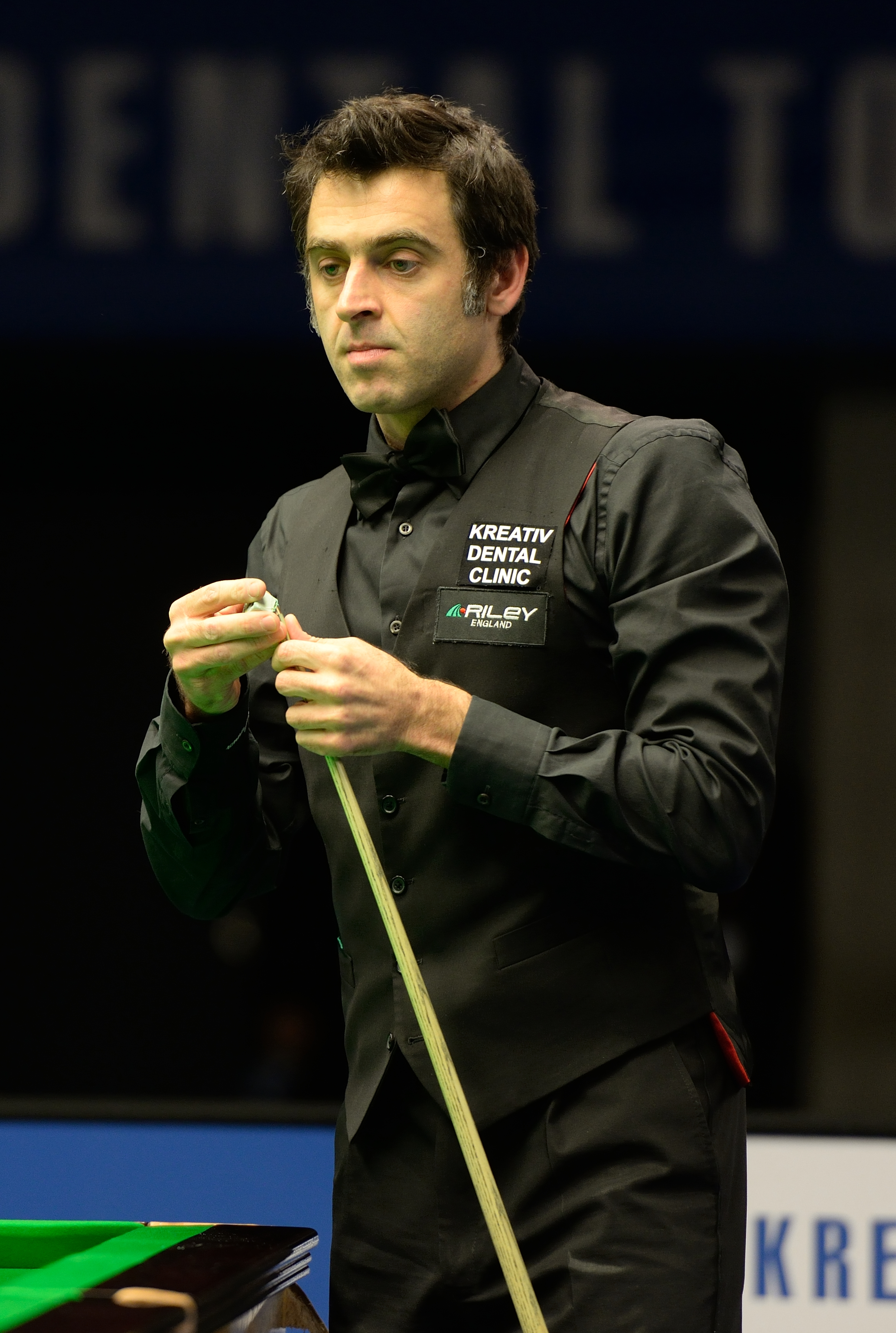
Ronnie O'Sullivan (pictured in 2015) defeated John Higgins 18–14 in the final to claim his maiden world title.

The final was played as the best of 35 frames, held over four sessions, on 6 and 7 May, between O'Sullivan and Higgins. O'Sullivan was competing in his first World Championship final, while it was the second for Higgins, having won the title in 1998. Referee Eirian Williams officiated his first World Championship final. In the first frame of the match, Higgins went in-off when he was on a break of 37 and allowed O'Sullivan to get on the scoreboard with an 88 break. Higgins replied by winning the second frame, but O'Sullivan then took three in a row for a 4–1 lead, making a break of 81 in the process. Higgins produced a century break of 135, but O'Sullivan won two more frames to end the first session with a four-frame advantage. Higgins started the second session with a break of 60. O'Sullivan took the next. Higgins then won two in a row, but O'Sullivan compiled breaks of 99 and 100 to go four frames clear at 5–9. Higgins replied with a century break, but O'Sullivan made a 99 break in the last of the session, which he ended 10–6 in front.

O'Sullivan made breaks including 81, 139, 85 and 86 as he took four of the first five frames of the third session for a 14–7 lead. Higgins replied by making breaks of 65 and 98 to take the remaining three and reduce the arrears to four frames. A break of 50 gave Higgins the first frame of the fourth and final session. O'Sullivan then won two in a row, but Higgins compiled breaks of 62 and 87 to also win back-to-back frames. Higgins was 13–16 behind at this point, with O'Sullivan only two frames away from victory. In frame 30, Higgins was 60 points ahead, but missed a red and O'Sullivan took the frame with a 68-point clearance. In the next frame, O'Sullivan missed a pot on frame ball allowing Higgins to make a 65 break to come closer at 14–17. O'Sullivan took advantage of a mistake by Higgins in frame 32 and went on to compile a break of 80 to win the match 18–14.

O'Sullivan claimed his maiden world title and a prize of £250,000. He dedicated the win to his father, who was serving a life sentence in prison, adding "It will probably mean more to my dad than it does to me". Higgins's defeat meant that he fell below O'Sullivan in the snooker world rankings. He commented "usually you rate a player on what they have won but Ronnie [O'Sullivan] has so much natural ability it is unbelievable. He just makes the game look so easy—he is a worthy champion".

== Main draw ==
The draw for the main tournament is shown below. The numbers in parentheses after the players' names denote the seedings for the 16 seeded players (1–16). The match winners are shown in bold.

**Round 1 (Last 32)**; Best of 19 frames
21 April
**Mark Williams (WAL) (1)**	**10**
Billy Snaddon (SCO)	4
25 April
**Joe Swail (NIR) (16)**	**10**
Sean Storey (ENG)	9
24 April
Fergal O'Brien (IRL) (9)	8
**Mark King (ENG)**	**10**
23 & 24 April
Alan McManus (SCO) (8)	2
**Patrick Wallace (NIR)**	**10**
25 & 26 April
**Stephen Lee (ENG) (5)**	**10**
Nigel Bond (ENG)	3
22 & 23 April
**Peter Ebdon (ENG) (12)**	**10**
James Wattana (THA)	8
21 & 22 April
**Dave Harold (ENG) (13)**	**10**
Quinten Hann (AUS)	5
22 & 23 April
**Ronnie O'Sullivan (ENG) (4)**	**10**
Andy Hicks (ENG)	2
25 & 26 April
**Stephen Hendry (SCO) (3)**	**10**
Mark Davis (ENG)	5
21 & 22 April
**Paul Hunter (ENG) (14)**	**10**
David Roe (ENG)	6
21 & 22 April
**Anthony Hamilton (ENG) (11)**	**10**
Marcus Campbell (SCO)	4
21 & 22 April
**Matthew Stevens (WAL) (6)**	**10**
Tony Drago (MLT)	1
23 April
**Ken Doherty (IRL) (7)**	**10**
Nick Dyson (ENG)	7
23 & 24 April
John Parrott (ENG) (10)	6
**Michael Judge (IRL)**	**10**
24 & 25 April
Marco Fu (HKG) (15)	8
**Chris Small (SCO)**	**10**
24 & 25 April
**John Higgins (SCO) (2)**	**10**
Graeme Dott (SCO)	4

**Round 2 (Last 16)**; Best of 25 frames
26, 27 & 28 April
(Wales) Mark Williams (1)	12
**(Northern Ireland) Joe Swail (16)**	**13**
27 & 28 April
(England) Mark King	5
**(Northern Ireland) Patrick Wallace**	**13**
28, 29 & 30 April
(England) Stephen Lee (5)	12
**(England) Peter Ebdon (12)**	**13**
29 & 30 April
(England) Dave Harold (13)	6
**(England) Ronnie O'Sullivan (4)**	**13**
27 & 28 April
**(Scotland) Stephen Hendry (3)**	**13**
(England) Paul Hunter (14)	5
26 & 27 April
(England) Anthony Hamilton (11)	5
**(Wales) Matthew Stevens (6)**	**13**
29 & 30 April
**(Republic of Ireland) Ken Doherty (7)**	**13**
(Republic of Ireland) Michael Judge	7
28, 29 & 30 April
(Scotland) Chris Small	8
**(Scotland) John Higgins (2)**	**13**

**Quarter-finals**; Best of 25 frames
1 & 2 May
**(Northern Ireland) Joe Swail (16)**	**13**
(Northern Ireland) Patrick Wallace	11
1 & 2 May
(England) Peter Ebdon (12)	6
**(England) Ronnie O'Sullivan (4)**	**13**
1 & 2 May
(Scotland) Stephen Hendry (3)	5
**(Wales) Matthew Stevens (6)**	**13**
1 & 2 May
(Republic of Ireland) Ken Doherty (7)	6
**(Scotland) John Higgins (2)**	**13**

**Semi-finals**; Best of 33 frames
3, 4 & 5 May
(Northern Ireland) Joe Swail (16)	11
**(England) Ronnie O'Sullivan (4)**	**17**
3, 4 & 5 May
(Wales) Matthew Stevens (6)	15
**(Scotland) John Higgins (2)**	**17**

**Final**; Best of 35 frames
6 & 7 May
**(England) Ronnie O'Sullivan (4)**	**18**
(Scotland) John Higgins (2)	14

=== Final: frame scores ===
Final: (Best of 35 frames) Crucible Theatre, Sheffield, 6 & 7 May 2001; Referee: Eirian Williams
**Ronnie O'Sullivan** (4); England				**18**–14			John Higgins (2); Scotland			
Session 1: **6**–2 (**6**–2)
Frame	1	2	3	4	5	6	7	8	9	10
O'Sullivan	**92**† (88)	0	**81**† (81)	**79**†	**56**†	0	**90**†	**71**† (70)	N/A	N/A
Higgins	41	**92**†	0	0	47	**135**† (135)	28	0	N/A	N/A
Session 2: 4–4 (**10**–6)
Frame	1	2	3	4	5	6	7	8	9	10
O'Sullivan	49	**49**†	2	50	**99**† (99)	**100**† (100)	22	**99**† (99)	N/A	N/A
Higgins	**72**†	36	**53**†	**68**†	0	12	**108**† (107)	0	N/A	N/A
Session 3: 4–4 (**14**–10)
Frame	1	2	3	4	5	6	7	8	9	10
O'Sullivan	**81**† (81)	12	**139**† (139)	**85**† (85)	**133**† (86)	33	21	0	N/A	N/A
Higgins	26	**78**†	0	0	0	**65**†	**67**† (65)	**98**† (98)	N/A	N/A
Session 4: 4–4 (**18**–14)
Frame	1	2	3	4	5	6	7	8	9	10
O'Sullivan	19	**68**†	**78**† (78)	8	5	**83**†	69	**80**† (80)	N/A	N/A
Higgins	**68**† (50)	0	43	**67**† (62)	**101**† (87)	60	**71**† (65)	45	N/A	N/A
(frame 19) **139**				Highest break			135 (frame 6)			
2				Century breaks			2			
**12**				50+ breaks			7			
(England) Ronnie O'Sullivan wins the 2001 World Snooker Championship † = Winner of frame

== Qualifying results ==
The qualifying matches were held between 20 February and 4 March at the Newport Centre in Newport, Wales. All the matches were played as the best of 19 frames.

=== Round 1 ===
Round 1 Best of 19 frames
(China) Hasimu Tuerxun	10
(Germany) Lasse Münstermann	3
(England) Tom Ford	10
(Thailand) Charoen Phorat	2
(England) Ricky Walden	10
(Republic of Ireland) David McDonnell	5
(England) Shailesh Jogia	10
(England) Shaun Murphy	9
(Canada) Bob Chaperon	10
(England) Ian Hurdman	6
(England) Darryn Walker	10
(England) Eddie Barker	3
(England) Lee Spick	10
(England) Michael Rhodes	7
(Australia) Neil Robertson	10
(England) Paul Davison	7

=== Rounds 2–6 ===
Round 2 Best of 19 frames
(Scotland) Hugh Abernethy	10
(China) Hasimu Tuerxun	4
(England) Nick Dyson	10
(England) Ian Brumby	7
(England) Tony Knowles	10
(Republic of Ireland) Colm Gilcreest	4
(England) Jason Weston	10
(England) Lee Richardson	8
(England) Tom Ford	10
(Scotland) Scott MacKenzie	4
(England) Craig Harrison	w/o
(England) Martin Clark	w/d
(Sweden) Farhan Mirza	10
(England) Craig Roper	8
(England) Jeff Cundy	10
(England) Ricky Walden	6
(Scotland) Stephen Maguire	10
(England) Troy Shaw	3
(England) Sean Storey	10
(England) Wayne Saidler	6
(England) Barry Hawkins	w/o
(Wales) Mark Bennett	w/d
(Thailand) Noppadon Noppachorn	10
(England) Anthony Bolsover	8
(England) Munraj Pal	10
(Scotland) Alan Burnett	2
(Scotland) Paul McPhillips	10
(England) Shailesh Jogia	7
(Belgium) Bjorn Haneveer	10
(England) Richard King	4
(England) Craig Butler	10
(Wales) Ryan Day	9
(Belgium) Patrick Delsemme	w/o
(Wales) Gareth Chilcott	w/d
(Netherlands) Stefan Mazrocis	10
(Cyprus) Mehmet Husnu	4
(England) Jason Barton	10
(Scotland) Chris Shade	7
(England) Andrew Higginson	10
(Canada) Bob Chaperon	7
(Wales) Philip Williams	10
(Netherlands) Mario Wehrmann	5
(England) Eddie Manning	10
(England) Mike Hallett	9
(England) Darryn Walker	10
(Wales) Wayne Jones	4
(England) Stuart Mann	10
(England) Peter McCullagh	5
(Wales) James Reynolds	10
(Republic of Ireland) Joe Delaney	9
(England) Karl Burrows	w/o
(England) Nick Terry	w/d
(Finland) Robin Hull	10
(England) Barry Mapstone	7
(England) Lee Spick	10
(England) Matt Wilson	3
(Australia) Neil Robertson	10
(Scotland) David McLellan	9
(Thailand) Somporn Kathawung	10
(England) Graham Lee	4
(England) Simon Bedford	10
(Hong Kong) Da Hailin	5
(England) Mark Selby	10
(England) Stuart Reardon	4

Round 3 Best of 19 frames
(Scotland) Hugh Abernethy	10
(Northern Ireland) Jason Prince	8
(England) Nick Dyson	10
(England) Mark Gray	8
(England) Tony Knowles	10
(New Zealand) Dene O'Kane	9
(England) Nick Pearce	10
(England) Jason Weston	6
(England) Barry Pinches	10
(England) Tom Ford	5
(England) Neal Foulds	10
(England) Craig Harrison	9
(Pakistan) Shokat Ali	10
(Sweden) Farhan Mirza	3
(England) Mark Davis	10
(England) Jeff Cundy	3
(Scotland) Stephen Maguire	10
(Scotland) John Lardner	3
(England) Sean Storey	10
(Republic of Ireland) Stephen O'Connor	2
(England) Barry Hawkins	10
(England) Robert Milkins	8
(Thailand) Noppadon Noppachorn	10
(England) Mike Dunn	5
(England) Munraj Pal	10
(England) Mick Price	3
(Scotland) Paul McPhillips	10
(England) Tony Jones	6
(Belgium) Bjorn Haneveer	10
(England) Darren Clarke	2
(England) Craig Butler	10
(England) Karl Broughton	7
(Belgium) Patrick Delsemme	10
(England) Leigh Griffin	8
(England) Steve Judd	10
(Netherlands) Stefan Mazrocis	8
(England) Jason Barton	10
(England) Tony Chappel	8
(England) Andrew Higginson	10
(England) Adrian Gunnell	8
(Wales) Philip Williams	10
(England) Paul Sweeny	8
(England) Wayne Brown	10
(England) Eddie Manning	9
(England) Darryn Walker	10
(Thailand) Phaitoon Phonbun	9
(England) Stuart Mann	10
(Scotland) Martin Dziewialtowski	9
(England) Dean Reynolds	10
(Wales) James Reynolds	7
(England) Karl Burrows	10
(Scotland) Craig MacGillivray	3
(England) Ali Carter	10
(Finland) Robin Hull	4
(Iceland) Kristján Helgason	10
(England) Lee Spick	7
(Australia) Neil Robertson	10
(Wales) Mark Fenton	9
(Thailand) Somporn Kathawung	10
(England) Willie Thorne	6
(England) Simon Bedford	10
(Republic of Ireland) Leo Fernandez	8
(England) Nick Walker	10
(England) Mark Selby	9

Round 4 Best of 19 frames
(England) Rod Lawler	10
(Scotland) Hugh Abernethy	4
(England) Nick Dyson	10
(England) Steve James	7
(England) Jimmy Michie	10
(England) Tony Knowles	2
(Canada) Alain Robidoux	10
(England) Nick Pearce	2
(England) Barry Pinches	10
(England) David Finbow	5
(Scotland) Jamie Burnett	10
(England) Neal Foulds	5
(Pakistan) Shokat Ali	10
(England) Stuart Bingham	7
(England) Mark Davis	10
(England) Peter Lines	4
(Scotland) Stephen Maguire	10
(England) Stuart Pettman	2
(England) Sean Storey	10
(England) Gary Ponting	8
(England) Bradley Jones	10
(England) Barry Hawkins	8
(Thailand) Noppadon Noppachorn	10
(England) Paul Wykes	9
(Wales) Anthony Davies	10
(England) Munraj Pal	6
(Republic of Ireland) Michael Judge	10
(Scotland) Paul McPhillips	1
(Belgium) Bjorn Haneveer	10
(England) Jason Ferguson	4
(England) Craig Butler	10
(Wales) Lee Walker	6
(Belgium) Patrick Delsemme	10
(Northern Ireland) Gerard Greene	3
(England) Alfie Burden	10
(England) Steve Judd	2
(England) Gary Wilkinson	10
(England) Jason Barton	5
(England) Michael Holt	10
(England) Andrew Higginson	5
(England) Andy Hicks	10
(Wales) Philip Williams	8
(Scotland) Euan Henderson	10
(England) Wayne Brown	3
(England) Jonathan Birch	10
(England) Darryn Walker	8
(England) Stuart Mann	10
(England) Matthew Couch	2
(England) David Roe	10
(England) Dean Reynolds	8
(England) Karl Burrows	10
(England) John Read	7
(Scotland) Marcus Campbell	10
(England) Ali Carter	8
(England) David Gray	10
(Iceland) Kristján Helgason	4
(England) Ian McCulloch	10
(Australia) Neil Robertson	8
(England) Joe Johnson	10
(Thailand) Somporn Kathawung	2
(England) Simon Bedford	10
(Wales) Paul Davies	3
(Northern Ireland) Patrick Wallace	10
(England) Nick Walker	2

Round 5 Best of 19 frames
(England) Nick Dyson	10
(England) Rod Lawler	8
(England) Jimmy Michie	10
(Canada) Alain Robidoux	7
(England) Barry Pinches	10
(Scotland) Jamie Burnett	5
(England) Mark Davis	10
(Pakistan) Shokat Ali	5
(England) Sean Storey	10
(Scotland) Stephen Maguire	5
(England) Bradley Jones	10
(Thailand) Noppadon Noppachorn	2
(Republic of Ireland) Michael Judge	10
(Wales) Anthony Davies	9
(Belgium) Bjorn Haneveer	10
(England) Craig Butler	7
(Belgium) Patrick Delsemme	10
(England) Alfie Burden	7
(England) Michael Holt	10
(England) Gary Wilkinson	5
(England) Andy Hicks	10
(Scotland) Euan Henderson	9
(England) Jonathan Birch	10
(England) Stuart Mann	6
(England) David Roe	10
(England) Karl Burrows	8
(Scotland) Marcus Campbell	10
(England) David Gray	9
(England) Ian McCulloch	10
(England) Joe Johnson	4
(Northern Ireland) Patrick Wallace	10
(England) Simon Bedford	9

Round 6 Best of 19 frames
(England) Nick Dyson	10
(England) Brian Morgan	9
(England) Nigel Bond	10
(England) Jimmy Michie	6
(Scotland) Chris Small	10
(England) Barry Pinches	8
(England) Mark Davis	10
(Wales) Dominic Dale	9
(England) Sean Storey	10
(Northern Ireland) Terry Murphy	9
(England) Mark King	10
(England) Bradley Jones	6
(Republic of Ireland) Michael Judge	10
(England) Jimmy White	7
(Scotland) Graeme Dott	10
(Australia) Bjorn Haneveer	8
(Australia) Quinten Hann	10
(Belgium) Patrick Delsemme	3
(Scotland) Billy Snaddon	10
(Belgium) Michael Holt	6
(England) Andy Hicks	10
(England) Steve Davis	6
(Thailand) James Wattana	10
(England) Jonathan Birch	5
(England) David Roe	10
(Wales) Darren Morgan	8
(Scotland) Marcus Campbell	10
(Scotland) Drew Henry	5
(Malta) Tony Drago	10
(England) Ian McCulloch	9
(Northern Ireland) Patrick Wallace	10
(England) Joe Perry	4

Note: w/o = walkover; w/d = withdrawn

== Century breaks ==
A total of 53 century breaks were made during the main stage of the tournament. The highest break was a 140 compiled by Joe Swail.

- 140, 138, 114, 107 – Joe Swail
- 139, 139, 136, 135, 126, 121, 113, 110, 107, 105, 103 – John Higgins
- 139, 134, 133, 126, 100, 100 – Matthew Stevens
- 139, 133, 119, 114, 108, 108, 106, 100, 100 – Ronnie O'Sullivan
- 137 – Mark King
- 135, 125, 104 – Patrick Wallace
- 130, 108, 100 – Paul Hunter
- 129, 106, 100 – Stephen Hendry
- 121, 100 – Stephen Lee
- 116, 114, 101 – Ken Doherty
- 114, 110 – Anthony Hamilton
- 110, 101 – Peter Ebdon
- 108 – Michael Judge
- 102 – Nick Dyson
- 101 – Chris Small
- 101 – Mark Williams
