= 2002 LG Cup (snooker) =

Snooker tournament

Tournament information
- Dates: 5–13 October 2002
- Venue: Guild Hall
- City: Preston
- Country: England
- Organisation: World Professional Billiards and Snooker Association
- Format: Ranking event
- Total prize fund: £597,200
- Winner's share: £82,500
- Highest break: Stephen Lee (ENG) (141)

Final
- Champion: Chris Small (SCO)
- Runner-up: Alan McManus (SCO)
- Score: 9–5

The 2002 LG Cup was a professional snooker tournament held from 5 to 13 October 2002, at the Guild Hall, in Preston, Lancashire, England. It was the second year the event was known as the LG Cup and the 21st overall staging of the competition. Sponsored by the Korean multinational conglomerate LG, the tournament was the first of eight World Professional Billiards and Snooker Association (WPBSA) ranking events in the 2002–03 snooker season and was televised in the United Kingdom on the BBC.

Chris Small, who has the spinal condition ankylosing spondylitis, was a 150/1 outsider when he won the tournament by defeating fellow Scot Alan McManus nine frames to five (9–5) in the final. It was Small's only major ranking tournament title of his career as he retired because of his disease three years later. In the semi-finals Small beat Jimmy Michie 6–2 and McManus defeated Steve Davis 6–2. Stephen Lee compiled the tournament's highest break of a 141 total clearance in his second round match against Ryan Day. The tournament preceded the second ranking event of the season, the British Open.

== Background ==
The tournament was created as the Professional Players Tournament in 1982 by the snooker governing body, the World Professional Billiards and Snooker Association (WPBSA), to provide another ranking event. It was renamed the Grand Prix for the 1984 event until 2001, when it was called the LG Cup, before reverting to the Grand Prix in 2004.

The 2002 tournament was held at the Guild Hall in Preston, Lancashire between 5 and 13 October. It was the first of eight WPBSA ranking events in the 2002–2003 season and the next event following last season's World Championship, which was won by Peter Ebdon. Stephen Lee won the 2001 LG Cup in a nine frames to four victory (9–4) over Ebdon. The event preceded the second ranking tournament of the season, the British Open. Sponsored by the Korean multinational conglomerate LG for the second year in a row, it had a prize fund of £597,200, and was broadcast on the BBC. The maximum number of frames contested in a match increased from nine in the first round to the quarter-finals to eleven in the semi-finals, leading up to the final, which was played as best-of-seventeen frames.

=== Prize money ===
The breakdown of prize money for the 2002 tournament is shown below:

- Winner: £82,500
- Runner-up: £42,500
- Semi-final (×2): £21,250
- Quarter-final (×4): £11,700
- Last 16 (×8): £9,600
- Last 32 (×16): £7,800
- Last 48 (×16): £4,000
- Last 64 (×16): £3,150
- Last 80 (×16): £2,150
- Last 96 (×16): £1,450
- Stage one highest break (×1): £1,800
- Stage two highest break (×1): £7,500
- Stage one maximum break: £5,000
- Stage two maximum break: £20,000
- Total: £597,200

== Tournament summary ==
=== Qualifying ===
Qualifying for the event took place over four rounds which were played between 2 and 16 September 2002 at the Meadowside Centre, Burton upon Trent, for players on the main tour ranked 33 and lower for one of 32 places in the final stage. The successful qualifiers included the likes of Ryan Day, Shokat Ali, Ian McCulloch, Jimmy Michie, Robin Hull, Patrick Wallace and Jamie Burnett.

=== Last 48 ===
The last 48 round occurred between 5 and 7 October, with the 16 qualifiers facing members of the top 32, but not including the top 16 seeds. Day, both the Snooker Writers Association and the World Snooker Newcomer of the Year, defeated Ali Carter 5–3. Day led 3–0 but Carter got the score back to 3–2 with breaks of 53 and 65 before Day won the match with an 83 break in frame six and a clearance in the eighth. Anthony Davies made breaks of 84, 85 and 72 in his 5–0 whitewash of Marcus Campbell and would play world number 4 John Higgins in the next round. Ali, Pakistan's number one ranked player, compiled breaks of 64, 51, 95 and 98 in a 5–1 victory over John Parrott, the 1991 world champion. Fergal O'Brien edged out Nick Dyson 5–3, while Tony Drago and Gerard Greene defeated Gary Wilkinson and Dominic Dale respectively by the same scoreline. Drew Henry was also beaten by exactly the same scoreline by Michael Holt, and Anthony Hamilton overcame Ian McCulloch to win 5–4 in a game that concluded past midnight on 5 October after a final frame safety exchange on the pink ball.

Former World Matchplay champion James Wattana defeated Hull 5–4, coming from 4–0 behind to win four consecutive frames from breaks of 56, 51 and 43 to force a final frame decider. Wattana won it after Hull left a red ball in the jaws of a corner pocket. Michael Judge whitewashed David Finbow 5–0, a match in which Judge's highest break was 48 and Finbow conceded the fifth frame despite being 49 points behind with 59 remaining on the table. Six-time world champion Steve Davis achieved the competition's third whitewash with a 5–0 victory over the world number 46 Jamie Burnett to set up a match with fellow Londoner Jimmy White for the first time in a ranking tournament since the semi-finals of the 1995 International Open. World number 29 Chris Small, who suffers from the spinal condition ankylosing spondylitis, beat Mark Davis 5–2. Small led Mark Davis 4–0 until the latter took two frames in succession. Small claimed frame seven to win the match. Scottish Open runner-up David Gray won 5–1 against Atthasit Mahitthi, while Patrick Wallace came from 2–0 and 4–3 behind to beat Dave Harold 5–4 in a 4-hour, 34-minute game. That delayed Nigel Bond's match with Brian Morgan by two hours, which Bond won 5–1. In the last game of round one, Michie beat Marco Fu 5–1.

=== Last 32 ===
The winners of the last 48 round qualified to face members of the top 16, which took place from 7 to 9 October. Day was defeated 5–4 by Lee, who achieved a 141 total clearance (the tournament's highest break) and Day compiled a 57 break to force a final frame decider. A break of 52 that commenced with a fluked red ball won Lee the match. Higgins whitewashed Davies 5–0 during which he missed an opportunity to achieve a maximum break in frame five, as he outscored Davies 361–75. Greene produced breaks of 61 and 78 in his 5–1 victory over world number 12 Graeme Dott. Ronnie O'Sullivan's breaks of 85, 56, 52 and 43 enabled him to beat Hamilton 5–2 in 85 minutes but expressed his displeasure at not achieving a sixth maximum break due to a lack of concentration. Ali missed a straightforward red ball while on 47 points in the opening frame of his 5–0 whitewash to McManus. Stephen Hendry, a seven-time world champion, opened his match with Drago by winning the first two frames. Drago made breaks of 32 and 36 to win frame three but Hendry won the next three with breaks of 52, 56 and 65 to win.

O'Brien led 2–0 with a break of 128 and his opponent Ebdon responded with a 101 break. Breaks of 103, 45 and 53 put Ebdon into the lead but O'Brien won the game 5–4 with victories in frame eight and the 41-minute ninth. In the match between Paul Hunter and Wattana, Hunter led 4–0 before Wattana won three successive frames. Hunter won frame eight and the match with a score of 91–8. Mark Williams led Judge 2–0 before Judge took three frames in a row to go 3–2 in front. Williams made a match-high break of 60 to win 5–3. Holt overcame Quinten Hann 5–4 in a ¼ hour battle on the final pink and black balls in the deciding frame of their match. White came from 3–1 behind to tie Davis at 3–3 with a break of 72. Both players shared the next two frames to force a final frame decider. Leading 49–16 with five un-potted red balls on the table, Davis fluked one of them and went on to produce a break of 21 to win the match that ran past midnight due to other fixtures running longer than expected.

On the second table, world number 16 Joe Perry lost 2–5 to Small despite the latter's heavy back strain. 1997 world champion and world number 5 Ken Doherty was the highest ranked player to lose in the round when Wallace beat him 5–3. Wallace dedicated the victory to his practice partner and former Northern Ireland Amateur Championship runner-up Barry McNamee who died when a car struck him that year. Joe Swail was another top 16 seed to be eliminated in round two when he lost 5–3 to Bond despite leading 3–1 midway through. Of the other two second round matches, Matthew Stevens lost 1–5 to Gray and Michie won 5–2 against the world number 11 Mark King.

=== Last 16 ===
The last 16 round was played from 9 to 10 October. Lee led McManus 3–1 but the latter took four straight frames with a break of 105 to force a final frame decider. Lee missed the final yellow ball shot and he potted the cue ball to give McManus the penalty points he required to return to contention and the latter made a 51 clearance to win 5–4. Greene took his fifth victory of the season when he beat O'Brien by the same scoreline. Small produced breaks of 58, 71 and 100 as he compiled 300 unanswered points against Higgins who won frame five to prevent a whitewash but Small took the sixth to claim a 5–1 victory. Holt took a 3–0 lead over O'Sullivan who responded to claim five consecutive frames for a 5–3 victory to avoid elimination.

Hunter led Hendry 3–1 with breaks of 112 and 66 and to 4–2 when Hendry achieved a 67 break in frame six before Hunter clinched the game 5–3 in a disjointed eighth frame. Michie edged out Wallace 5–4 to enter his first ranking professional tournament quarter-final since 1999. Similarly, Davis took the opening three frames of a match against Williams while the latter claimed frame four. Davis produced a run of 69 in frame five and he then compiled a match-winning 48 in the sixth frame for a final score of 5–1 in his favour. Davis remarked of his performance after the match, "It's the best I've played for years." In the final third round match Gray came from 4–2 behind to beat Bond 5–3.

=== Quarter-finals ===
The four quarter-finals were contested on 11 October. Small defeated O'Sullivan 5–1 to reach his first semi-final since the 1998 tournament. Small produced breaks of 81, 44, 71 and 137, which gave him a 4–0 lead at the mid-session interval. O'Sullivan prevented the first whitewash of his career since the 1997 China International with victory in a disjointed frame five but Small won the match with a 78 clearance in the sixth. Greene compiled breaks of 66 and 77 to lead Michie 2–0. After Michie won frame three, Greene took the following two to hold a 4–1 advantage. Michie responded with breaks of 66 and 98 to force a final frame decider, which he won on a long-range pink ball shot for a 5–4 scoreline.

Davis overcame Hunter 5–4 in a tightly contested match lasting 3 hours, 32 minutes. Coming from 3–0 and 4–2 behind, Davis made breaks of 47, 105 and 52 to bring the game to a final frame decider. With one red ball left on the table in frame nine, Hunter missed it five times from a snookered position and Davis accrued 21 points in fouls from Hunter. Davis won the 47-minute frame and the match with a score of 85–40. McManus defeated Gray 5–3 in a match which Gray's highest break was 98. McManus came from 3–1 down to produce breaks of 76, 94 and 46 and won the eighth frame to progress into his 35th career semi-final.

=== Semi-finals ===
The semi-finals on 12 October were best-of-11 frames. Small reached the first major ranking final of his career when he defeated Michie 6–2. Small won the first four frames, which included a 41-minute frame two that Michie lost because of a tight battle on the pink ball. Small produced a break of 77 in the third. After the mid-session interval, Michie won frames five and six but breaks of 36, 37, 43 and 39 won the match for Small, who commented on his delight to reach the final, "When I was a youngster I watched the snooker on television and thought how great it must be to play in a major final. Now I've done it at last and I'm determined to enjoy it. It's a dream come true and I can't wait."

The other semi-final saw McManus reach his 15th career final with a 6–4 victory over Davis in a match that lasted almost five hours. McManus won three frames on the pink ball and made breaks of 78, 50 and 76 to win the match. A male spectator was ejected from the Preston Guild Hall during frame eight for audible snoring and it was twice restarted because of separate safety shot stalemates. After the game, McManus called it "one of the hardest matches of my life" after he did not pot a single ball because of extended table play from Davis, "Halfway through I felt like a couldn't pot a ball so I'm pleased to have got through. I think it will be a different game in the final because Chris goes for his shots. It's a big match for both of us."

=== Final ===
The all-Scottish best-of-17 final happened on 13 October. McManus led 3–1 with successive breaks of 62 and 73. Small reduced McManus' lead by one frame with a half century break before McManus produced a 62 run to lead 4–2. Small produced a 69 break in frame seven and won the eighth to end the first session level at 4–4. When play resumed in the second session, a break of 62 from Small after McManus missed a mid-range red ball to a top corner pocket for the lead. More safety errors from McManus gave Small a chance to produce breaks of 47 and 27 in frame ten as the former did not record a single point in this period. McManus took the 11th frame after Small failed to pot the last red ball along the top cushion. Small took the next three frames to win the match 9–5. The match lasted 6 hours and 13 minutes. Aged 29 and a 150/1 outsider, he became the first non-top 16 ranked player to win a ranking tournament since O'Brien at the 1999 British Open.

It transpired to be the only ranking event victory of Small's career having retired from professional snooker three years later as a result of his affliction. Small earned £82,500 for the win. Post-match, Small dedicated his victory to his grandmother who died three years prior, "I held her hand in hospital the day before she died and when she asked me to win a tournament for her one day, I promised her I would. Now I've done it, so I just hope she was up there looking down and watching my victory." He also said it felt "like a dream", and would use the winnings to pay the mortgage on his house. McManus said he was pleased for Small and did not believe his game with Davis wore him out despite appearing visibly tired, "But from my point of view it was an anti-climax. It was not a great match but Chris was solid and if I left anything sticking out he knocked it in. But I'm delighted for him, he's a lovely lad and he deserves this victory after all he's been through."

The victory, according to Phil Yates of The Times, made Small possibly, "one of the most unlikely winners of a leading competition for years" because of his reputation of being a journeyman and him requiring monthly injections to reduce the effect of his spinal condition.

== Main draw ==
The numbers in the box to the left of the player is their seeding. Players listed in bold denote a match winner. The draw for the main competition is shown below.

Last 48; Best of 9 frames
31	Ali Carter (ENG)	3
**Ryan Day** (WAL)	**5**
18	John Parrott (ENG)	1
34	**Shokat Ali** (PAK)	**5**
30	**Nigel Bond** (ENG)	**5**
42	Brian Morgan (ENG)	1
19	**David Gray** (ENG)	**5**
Atthasit Mahitthi (THA)	1
28	**Tony Drago** (MLT)	**5**
46	Gary Wilkinson (ENG)	3
32	**James Wattana** (THA)	**5**
39	Robin Hull (FIN)	4
25	**Steve Davis** (ENG)	**5**
44	Jamie Burnett (SCO)	4
24	**Michael Judge** (IRL)	**5**
49	David Finbow (ENG)	0
17	**Anthony Hamilton** (ENG)	**5**
43	Ian McCulloch (ENG)	4
22	Drew Henry (SCO)	3
35	**Michael Holt** (ENG)	**5**
29	**Chris Small** (SCO)	**5**
37	Mark Davis (ENG)	2
26	**Anthony Davies** (WAL)	**5**
41	Marcus Campbell (SCO)	0
21	Dave Harold (ENG)	4
36	**Patrick Wallace** (NIR)	**5**
27	Marco Fu (HKG)	2
55	**Jimmy Michie** (ENG)	**5**
20	Dominic Dale (WAL)	3
63	**Gerard Greene** (NIR)	**5**
23	**Fergal O'Brien** (IRL)	**5**
62	Nick Dyson (ENG)	3

Last 32; Best of 9 frames
1	**Stephen Lee** (ENG)	**5**
Ryan Day (WAL)	4
15	**Alan McManus** (SCO)	**5**
34	Shokat Ali (PAK)	0
16	Joe Swail (NIR)	3
30	**Nigel Bond** (ENG)	**5**
8	Matthew Stevens (WAL)	1
19	**David Gray** (ENG)	**5**
7	**Stephen Hendry** (SCO)	**5**
28	Tony Drago (MLT)	1
9	**Paul Hunter** (ENG)	**5**
32	James Wattana (THA)	3
10	Jimmy White (ENG)	4
25	**Steve Davis** (ENG)	**5**
4	**Mark Williams** (WAL)	**5**
24	Michael Judge (IRL)	3
3	**Ronnie O'Sullivan** (ENG)	**5**
17	Anthony Hamilton (ENG)	2
14	Quinten Hann (AUS)	4
35	**Michael Holt** (ENG)	**5**
13	Joe Perry (ENG)	2
29	**Chris Small** (SCO)	**5**
5	**John Higgins** (SCO)	**5**
26	Anthony Davies (WAL)	0
6	Ken Doherty (IRL)	3
36	**Patrick Wallace** (NIR)	**5**
11	Mark King (ENG)	2
55	**Jimmy Michie** (ENG)	**5**
12	Graeme Dott (SCO)	1
63	**Gerard Greene** (NIR)	**5**
2	Peter Ebdon (ENG)	4
23	**Fergal O'Brien** (IRL)	**5**

Last 16; Best of 9 frames
1	(England) Stephen Lee	4
15	(Scotland) **Alan McManus**	**5**
30	(England) Nigel Bond	4
19	(England) **David Gray**	**5**
7	(Scotland) Stephen Hendry	3
9	(England) **Paul Hunter**	**5**
25	(England) **Steve Davis**	**5**
4	(Wales) Mark Williams	1
3	(England) **Ronnie O'Sullivan**	**5**
35	(England) Michael Holt	3
29	(Scotland) **Chris Small**	**5**
5	(Scotland) John Higgins	1
36	(Northern Ireland) Patrick Wallace	4
55	(England) **Jimmy Michie**	**5**
63	(Northern Ireland) **Gerard Greene**	**5**
23	(Republic of Ireland) Fergal O'Brien	4

Quarter-finals; Best of 9 frames
15	(Scotland) **Alan McManus**	**5**
19	(England) David Gray	3
9	(England) Paul Hunter	4
25	(England) **Steve Davis**	**5**
3	(England) Ronnie O'Sullivan	1
29	(Scotland) **Chris Small**	**5**
55	(England) **Jimmy Michie**	**5**
63	(Northern Ireland) Gerard Greene	4

Semi-finals; Best of 11 frames
15	(Scotland) **Alan McManus**	**6**
25	(England) Steve Davis	4
29	(Scotland) **Chris Small**	**6**
55	(England) Jimmy Michie	2

Final; Best of 17 frames
15	(Scotland) Alan McManus	5
29	(Scotland) **Chris Small**	**9**

=== Final ===
Scores in bold denote all winning frame scores and the winning finalist. Breaks over 50 are shown in brackets.

Final: Best of 17 frames. Referee: Paul Collier. Guild Hall, Preston, England, 13 October 2002.
Alan McManus (15); Scotland	5–**9**	**Chris Small** (29); Scotland
Afternoon: 30–**81**, **94**–34, **68**–19 (62), **78**–15 (73), 6–**75** (51), **75**–24 (62), 0–**69** (69), 52–**54**; Evening: 0–**94** (62), 0–**75**, **58**–55, 48–**76**, 31–**65** (65), 28–**63**
**73**	Highest break	69
0	Century breaks	0
3	50+ breaks	**4**

== Qualifying ==
Players in bold denote a match winner.

=== Round 1 ===
Best of 9 frames

**Ryan Day** (WAL)	**5**–3	Matthew Selt (ENG)
**Alain Robidoux** (CAN)	**5**–3	Hugh Abernethy (SCO)
**Peter Lines** (ENG)	**5**–4	Lee Spick (ENG)
**Rod Lawler** (ENG)	**5**–3	Peter Roscoe (WAL)
John Read (ENG)	3–**5**	**Johl Younger** (AUS)
Antony Bolsover (ENG)	2–**5**	**Jamie Cope** (ENG)
**Paul Wykes** (ENG)	**5**–3	Jin Long (CHN)
Jason Ferguson (ENG)	0–**5**	**Atthasit Mahitthi** (THA)
Paul Davies (WAL)	4–**5**	**David Gilbert** (ENG)
Tony Jones (ENG)	4–**5**	**Colm Gilcreest** (IRL)
Joe Johnson (ENG)	3–**5**	**Bob Chaperon** (CAN)
Stephen Kershaw (ENG)	2–**5**	**Kwan Poomjang** (THA)
**Shaun Murphy** (ENG)	**5**–2	Matthew Farrant (WAL)
Luke Fisher (ENG)	4–**5**	**Stefan Mazrocis** (NLD)
**Paul Davison** (ENG)	**5**–4	Justin Astley (ENG)
**Phaitoon Phonbun** (THA)	**5**–3	Mark Gray (ENG)

**Kristján Helgason** (ISL)	**5**–1	Mario Wehrman (NLD)
Jeff Cundy (ENG)	3–**5**	**Pang Weiguo** (CHN)
Craig Butler (ENG)	2–**5**	**Jimmy Robertson** (ENG)
Andrew Norman (ENG)	4–**5**	**Jason Weston** (ENG)
**Martin Dziewialtowski** (SCO)	**5**–0	Nick Pearce (ENG)
Andrew Higginson (ENG)	3–**5**	**David John** (WAL)
Troy Shaw (ENG)	2–**5**	**Simon Bedford** (ENG)
Jason Prince (NIR)	4–**5**	**David McLellan** (SCO)
Matthew Couch (ENG)	4–**5**	**Munraj Pal** (ENG)
**Wayne Brown** (ENG)	**5**–4	Ricky Walden (ENG)
Neal Foulds (ENG)	0–**5**	**Leo Fernandez** (IRL)
**Rory McLeod** (ENG)	**5**–4	Darren Clarke (ENG)
**Euan Henderson** (SCO)	**5**–3	Manan Chandra (IND)
**Sean Storey** (ENG)	**5**–1	Eddie Manning (ENG)
**Lee Walker** (WAL)	**5**–1	James Reynolds (WAL)
**Adrian Gunnell** (ENG)	**5**–0	David Donovan (WAL)

=== Round 2–4 ===
Round 2 Best of 9 frames
(Wales) **Ryan Day**	**5**
(Canada) Alain Robidoux	4
(England) Peter Lines	2
(England) **Rod Lawler**	**5**
(Australia) Johl Younger	2
(England) **Jamie Cope**	**5**
(England) Paul Wykes	1
(Thailand) **Atthasit Mahitthi**	**5**
(England) David Gilbert	3
(Republic of Ireland) **Colm Gilcreest**	**5**
(Canada) Bob Chaperon	2
(Thailand) **Kwan Poomjang**	**5**
(England) Shaun Murphy	2
(Netherlands) **Stefan Mazrocis**	**5**
(England) **Paul Davison**	**5**
(Thailand) Phaitoon Phonbun	3
(Iceland) **Kristján Helgason**	**5**
(China) Pang Weiguo	2
(England) Jimmy Robertson	1
(England) **Jason Weston**	**5**
(Scotland) **Martin Dziewialtowski**	**5**
(Wales) David John	2
(England) Simon Bedford	1
(Scotland) **David McLellan**	**5**
(England) Munraj Pal	2
(England) **Wayne Brown**	**5**
(Republic of Ireland) **Leo Fernandez**	**5**
(England) Rory McLeod	4
(Scotland) Euan Henderson	2
(England) **Sean Storey**	**5**
(Wales) Lee Walker	3
(England) **Adrian Gunnell**	**5**

Round 3 Best of 9 frames
(Belgium) Bjorn Haneveer	3
(Wales) **Ryan Day**	**5**
(England) **Andy Hicks**	1
(England) **Rod Lawler**	**5**
(England) Stuart Pettman	4
(England) **Jamie Cope**	**5**
(England) Nick Walker	4
(Thailand) **Atthasit Mahitthi**	**5**
(England) Bradley Jones	1
(Republic of Ireland) **Colm Gilcreest**	**5**
(Scotland) Stephen Maguire	2
(Thailand) **Kwan Poomjang**	**5**
(England) **Barry Pinches**	**5**
(Netherlands) Stefan Mazrocis	3
(England) **David Finbow**	**5**
(England) Paul Davison	4
(England) **Stuart Bingham**	**5**
(Iceland) Kristján Helgason	1
(England) **Mike Dunn**	**5**
(England) Jason Weston	3
(England) Barry Hawkins	4
(Scotland) **Martin Dziewialtowski**	**5**
(England) Mark Selby	4
(Scotland) **David McLellan**	**5**
(Wales) **Darren Morgan**	**5**
(England) Wayne Brown	3
(England) **Jimmy Michie**	**5**
(Republic of Ireland) Leo Fernandez	2
(Northern Ireland) **Gerard Greene**	**5**
(England) Sean Storey	4
(England) **Nick Dyson**	**5**
(England) Adrian Gunnell	2

Round 4 Best of 9 frames
(England) Jonathan Birch	4
(Wales) **Ryan Day**	**5**
(Pakistan) **Shokat Ali**	**5**
(England) Rod Lawler	2
(England) **Brian Morgan**	**5**
(England) Jamie Cope	4
(Northern Ireland) Terry Murphy	2
(Thailand) **Atthasit Mahitthi**	**5**
(England) **Gary Wilkinson**	**5**
(Republic of Ireland) Colm Gilcreest	3
(Finland) **Robin Hull**	**5**
(Thailand) Kwan Poomjang	2
(Scotland) **Jamie Burnett**	**5**
(England) Barry Pinches	4
(England) David Roe	4
(England) **David Finbow**	**5**
(England) **Ian McCulloch**	**5**
(England) Stuart Bingham	4
(England) **Michael Holt**	**5**
(England) Mike Dunn	2
(England) **Mark Davis**	**5**
(Scotland) Martin Dziewialtowski	3
(Scotland) **Marcus Campbell**	**5**
(Scotland) David McLellan	3
(Northern Ireland) **Patrick Wallace**	**5**
(Wales) Darren Morgan	4
(Scotland) Billy Snaddon	3
(England) **Jimmy Michie**	**5**
(England) Robert Milkins	4
(Northern Ireland) **Gerard Greene**	**5**
(England) Alfie Burden	1
(England) **Nick Dyson**	**5**
