= 2004 UK Championship =

2004 Travis Perkins UK Championship
Tournament information
- Dates: 15–28 November 2004
- Venue: Barbican Centre
- City: York
- Country: England
- Organisation: WPBSA
- Format: Ranking event
- Total prize fund: £525,000
- Winner's share: £70,000
- Highest break: David Gray (ENG) (147)

Final
- Champion: Stephen Maguire (SCO)
- Runner-up: David Gray (ENG)
- Score: 10–1

The 2004 UK Championship (officially the 2004 Travis Perkins UK Championship) was a professional ranking snooker tournament that took place between 15 and 28 November 2004 at the Barbican Centre in York, England.

During the qualification Jamie Burnett compiled a 148 break, the first break exceeding 147 in professional competition. It was also the second 16-red clearance in a professional tournament.

Matthew Stevens was the defending champion, but lost his first round match to Barry Pinches.

Stephen Maguire won his first UK Championship, beating David Gray 10–1 in the final. During the tournament Gray compiled his first maximum break, the 50th ever made in professional play.

== Tournament summary ==
Defending champion Matthew Stevens was the number 1 seed with World Champion Ronnie O'Sullivan seeded 2. The remaining places were allocated to players based on the world rankings.

== Prize fund ==
The breakdown of prize money for this year is shown below:

- Winner: £70,000
- Runner-up: £35,000
- Semi-final: £17,500
- Quarter-final: £14,000
- Last 16: £10,500
- Last 32: £7,200
- Last 48: £4,125
- Last 64: £2,000
- Stage two highest break: £6,000
- Stage two maximum break: £25,000

== Main draw ==
Last 48; Best of 17 frames
21	(England) Barry Pinches	9
35	(England) Nigel Bond	5
20	(England) Joe Perry	9
63	(Scotland) Marcus Campbell	7
19	(England) Ali Carter	9
74	(England) Tom Ford	8
18	(Australia) Quinten Hann	9
65	(Pakistan) Shokat Ali	6
25	(England) Anthony Hamilton	5
50	(England) Andy Hicks	9
30	(Northern Ireland) Joe Swail	7
68	(Australia) Neil Robertson	9
22	(Malta) Tony Drago	3
36	(England) Mark Selby	9
17	(England) Ian McCulloch	4
43	(England) Barry Hawkins	9
23	(England) Mark King	9
47	(Finland) Robin Hull	7
27	(Scotland) Drew Henry	8
45	(Wales) Ryan Day	9
31	(England) John Parrott	9
33	(Thailand) James Wattana	5
29	(England) Michael Holt	4
78	(England) Ricky Walden	9
28	(England) Robert Milkins	9
51	(England) Sean Storey	3
26	(Northern Ireland) Gerard Greene	7
55	(England) Jimmy Michie	9
32	(Wales) Dominic Dale	9
76	(China) Ding Junhui	3
24	(Scotland) Stephen Maguire	9
40	(England) Mark Davis	2

Last 32; Best of 17 frames
1	(Wales) Matthew Stevens	4
21	(England) Barry Pinches	9
12	(Scotland) Chris Small	7
20	(England) Joe Perry	9
11	(England) Jimmy White (Note: White retired at 0–7 due to illness)	0
19	(England) Ali Carter	9
5	(England) Paul Hunter	9
18	(Australia) Quinten Hann	7
7	(Republic of Ireland) Ken Doherty	7
50	(England) Andy Hicks	9
15	(Scotland) Graeme Dott	9
68	(Australia) Neil Robertson	8
14	(England) David Gray	9
36	(England) Mark Selby	3
4	(Scotland) Stephen Hendry	7
43	(England) Barry Hawkins	9
3	(Wales) Mark Williams	3
23	(England) Mark King	9
10	(Scotland) Alan McManus	9
45	(Wales) Ryan Day	8
16	(Hong Kong) Marco Fu	3
31	(England) John Parrott	9
6	(Scotland) John Higgins	7
78	(England) Ricky Walden	9
8	(England) Peter Ebdon	9
28	(England) Robert Milkins	6
9	(England) Stephen Lee	9
55	(England) Jimmy Michie	4
13	(England) Steve Davis	9
32	(Wales) Dominic Dale	8
2	(England) Ronnie O'Sullivan	6
24	(Scotland) Stephen Maguire	9

Last 16; Best of 17 frames
21	(England) Barry Pinches	4
20	(England) Joe Perry	9
19	(England) Ali Carter	9
5	(England) Paul Hunter	8
50	(England) Andy Hicks	4
15	(Scotland) Graeme Dott	9
14	(England) David Gray	9
43	(England) Barry Hawkins	6
23	(England) Mark King	9
10	(Scotland) Alan McManus	8
31	(England) John Parrott	9
78	(England) Ricky Walden	5
8	(England) Peter Ebdon	8
9	(England) Stephen Lee	9
13	(England) Steve Davis	2
24	(Scotland) Stephen Maguire	9

Quarter-finals; Best of 17 frames
20	(England) Joe Perry	9
19	(England) Ali Carter	7
15	(Scotland) Graeme Dott	7
14	(England) David Gray	9
23	(England) Mark King	9
31	(England) John Parrott	6
9	(England) Stephen Lee	4
24	(Scotland) Stephen Maguire	9

Semi-finals; Best of 17 frames
20	(England) Joe Perry	8
14	(England) David Gray	9
23	(England) Mark King	4
24	(Scotland) Stephen Maguire	9

Final; Best of 19 frames
14	(England) David Gray	1
24	(Scotland) Stephen Maguire	10

== Final ==
Final: Best of 19 frames. Referee: Colin Brinded. Barbican Centre, York, England, 28 November 2004.
David Gray (14); England	1–10	Stephen Maguire (24); Scotland
Afternoon: 49–81, 84–10, 42–71, 41–86 (85), 21–83, 7–67, 14–84 (57), 1–115 (110); Evening: 0–131 (131), 16–80 (80), 0–122 (122)
<50	Highest break	131
0	Century breaks	3
0	50+ breaks	6

== Qualifying ==
Qualifying for the tournament took place between 14 and 19 October 2004 at Pontin's in Prestatyn, Wales.

Round 1 Best of 17 frames
(England) Andrew Norman	9
(Republic of Ireland) Rodney Goggins	4
(Wales) Darren Morgan	3
(England) Mike Hallett	9
(England) Tom Ford	9
(England) Brian Salmon	7
(Pakistan) Shokat Ali	9
(England) David Hall	3
(Republic of Ireland) Joe Delaney	8
(England) Joe Jogia	9
(Australia) Neil Robertson	9
(England) Paul Davison	3
(Wales) Paul Davies	6
(England) Gary Wilson	9
(Republic of Ireland) Leo Fernandez	9
(China) Jin Long	7
(Scotland) Scott MacKenzie	9
(England) Adam Davies	3
(England) Craig Butler	7
(Republic of Ireland) David McDonnell	9
(England) Simon Bedford	9
(Northern Ireland) Sean O'Neill	1
(England) Ricky Walden	9
(England) Ben Woollaston	6
(England) Paul Wykes	4
(England) Mark Gray	9
(England) Rory McLeod	9
(England) Steve James	6
(China) Ding Junhui	9
(Netherlands) Stefan Mazrocis	3
(England) Alfie Burden	9
(Scotland) Hugh Abernethy	6

Round 2 Best of 17 frames
(England) Nick Walker	9
(England) Andrew Norman	8
(Scotland) Marcus Campbell	9
(England) Mike Hallett	2
(England) David Roe	8
(England) Tom Ford	9
(England) Gary Wilkinson	7
(Pakistan) Shokat Ali	9
(England) Andy Hicks	9
(England) Joe Jogia	7
(England) David Finbow	4
(Australia) Neil Robertson	9
(England) Mike Dunn	9
(England) Gary Wilson	3
(Scotland) Jamie Burnett	9
(Republic of Ireland) Leo Fernandez	8
(England) Adrian Gunnell	9
(Scotland) Scott MacKenzie	3
(England) Jonathan Birch	3
(Republic of Ireland) David McDonnell	9
(Wales) Anthony Davies	3
(England) Simon Bedford	9
(Wales) Lee Walker	6
(England) Ricky Walden	9
(England) Sean Storey	9
(England) Mark Gray	7
(England) Jimmy Michie	9
(England) Rory McLeod	7
(Belgium) Bjorn Haneveer	5
(China) Ding Junhui	9
(England) Rod Lawler	9
(England) Alfie Burden	7

Round 3 Best of 17 frames
(England) Nigel Bond	9
(England) Nick Walker	2
(Northern Ireland) Patrick Wallace	8
(Scotland) Marcus Campbell	9
(England) Nick Dyson	5
(England) Tom Ford	9
(England) Stuart Bingham	8
(Pakistan) Shokat Ali	9
(England) Dave Harold	5
(England) Andy Hicks	9
(England) Shaun Murphy	8
(Australia) Neil Robertson	9
(England) Mark Selby	9
(England) Mike Dunn	6
(England) Barry Hawkins	9
(Scotland) Jamie Burnett	4
(Finland) Robin Hull	9
(England) Adrian Gunnell	2
(Wales) Ryan Day	9
(Republic of Ireland) David McDonnell	2
(Thailand) James Wattana	9
(England) Simon Bedford	7
(England) Brian Morgan	6
(England) Ricky Walden	9
(Republic of Ireland) Michael Judge	8
(England) Sean Storey	9
(England) Stuart Pettman	6
(England) Jimmy Michie	9
(Republic of Ireland) Fergal O'Brien	4
(China) Ding Junhui	9
(England) Mark Davis	9
(England) Rod Lawler	4

== Century breaks ==
=== Televised stage centuries ===
- 147, 139, 118, 105 – David Gray
- 141, 131, 122, 118, 110, 106, 104, 102, 100 – Stephen Maguire
- 141 – Stephen Hendry
- 140, 116 – Ricky Walden
- 136, 136, 111 – Peter Ebdon
- 130, 128 – Mark King
- 130, 107 – Ryan Day
- 128 – Chris Small
- 120 – Robert Milkins
- 118, 113, 102 – Ronnie O'Sullivan
- 117 – Alan McManus
- 114, 102 – Joe Perry
- 114 – John Higgins
- 113, 104 – Stephen Lee
- 112, 100 – Barry Hawkins
- 107 – Ali Carter
- 105 – Jimmy Michie
- 101 – John Parrott
- 101 – Graeme Dott

=== Qualifying stage centuries ===
- 148, 115, 113, 104, 103 – Jamie Burnett
- 143, 133 – Shaun Murphy
- 134, 132, 106 – Robin Hull
- 133, 101 – Andy Hicks
- 132, 130, 101 – David McDonnell
- 132, 108 – Rory McLeod
- 131, 118 – James Wattana
- 131 – Gary Wilson
- 130, 121, 101 – Stuart Bingham
- 129, 124, 14, 102 – Ding Junhui
- 129 – Nigel Bond
- 128, 125, 112 – Ricky Walden
- 126 – Bjorn Haneveer
- 126 – Ryan Day
- 124, 113 – John Parrott
- 121, 116, 111, 109 – Neil Robertson
- 120 – Simon Bedford
- 120 – Gerard Greene
- 120 – Joe Jogia
- 119 – Steve James
- 117 – Alfie Burden
- 115, 100 – Paul Davies
- 113 – Shokat Ali
- 111 – Leo Fernandez
- 109, 104 – Michael Judge
- 108 – Anthony Davies
- 106 – Stephen Maguire
- 102 – Fergal O'Brien
- 101 – Dominic Dale
- 101 – Adam Davies
- 101 – Barry Pinches
- 100 – Nick Dyson
