= 1999 Masters (snooker) =

Professional non-ranking snooker tournament, Feb 1999

1999 Benson & Hedges Masters
Tournament information
- Dates: 7–14 February 1999
- Venue: Wembley Conference Centre
- City: London
- Country: England
- Organisation: WPBSA
- Format: Non-ranking event
- Total prize fund: £575,000
- Winner's share: £155,000
- Highest break: Mark Williams (WAL) (123)

Final
- Champion: John Higgins (SCO)
- Runner-up: Ken Doherty (IRL)
- Score: 10–8

The 1999 Masters (officially the 1999 Benson & Hedges Masters) was a professional non-ranking snooker tournament that took place between 7 and 14 February 1999 at the Wembley Conference Centre in London, England. The wild-card matches were extended from 9 to 11 frames.

John Higgins defeated Ken Doherty 10–8 in the final to win his first Masters title. He had also won the World title (where he also defeated Doherty) and UK title in 1998, meaning that at the time he held all three Triple Crown titles simultaneously. Before his semi-final match Higgins had said, referring to the possibility of holding all three titles, "That triple crown would be a dream but it's going to be tough." After his win, the term "Triple Crown" was used in a number of newspapers to describe Higgins' feat.

== Field ==
Defending champion Mark Williams was the number 1 seed with World Champion John Higgins seeded 2. Places were allocated to the top 16 players in the world rankings. Players seeded 15 and 16 played in the wild-card round against the winner of the qualifying event, David Gray (ranked 61), and Jimmy White (ranked 18), who was the wild-card selection. David Gray and Mark King were making their debuts in the Masters.

== Prize fund ==
The breakdown of prize money for this year is shown below:
Winner: £155,000
Runner-up: £80,000
Semi-finalist: £40,000
Quarter finalist: £26,000
Last 16: £15,000
Wild-card round: £9,000

High break Prize: £18,000
Maximum break: B&H Gold Award and a Honda car

Total: £575,000

== Wild-card round ==
In the preliminary round, the wild-card players plays the 15th and 16th seeds:

Match	Date		Score	
WC1	Sunday 7 February	James Wattana (THA) (15)	6–2	David Gray (ENG)
WC2	Sunday 7 February	Mark King (ENG) (16)	6–5	Jimmy White (ENG)

== Main draw ==
Last 16; Best of 11 frames
1	Mark Williams (WAL)	6
13	Nigel Bond (ENG)	0
8	Alan McManus (SCO)	6
9	Stephen Lee (ENG)	2
5	Ken Doherty (IRL)	6
14	Steve Davis (ENG)	4
4	Ronnie O'Sullivan (ENG)	6
15	James Wattana (THA)	5
3	Stephen Hendry (SCO)	4
10	Tony Drago (MLT)	6
6	John Parrott (ENG)	4
11	Anthony Hamilton (ENG)	6
7	Peter Ebdon (ENG)	5
16	Mark King (ENG)	6
2	John Higgins (SCO)	6
12	Alain Robidoux (CAN)	1

Quarter-finals; Best of 11 frames
1	(Wales) Mark Williams	4
8	(Scotland) Alan McManus	6
5	(Republic of Ireland) Ken Doherty	6
4	(England) Ronnie O'Sullivan	2
10	(Malta) Tony Drago	5
11	(England) Anthony Hamilton	6
16	(England) Mark King	1
2	(Scotland) John Higgins	6

Semi-finals; Best of 11 frames
8	(Scotland) Alan McManus	3
5	(Republic of Ireland) Ken Doherty	6
11	(England) Anthony Hamilton	3
2	(Scotland) John Higgins	6

Final; Best of 19 frames
5	(Republic of Ireland) Ken Doherty	8
2	(Scotland) John Higgins	10

== Final ==
Final: Best of 19 frames. Referee: Jan Verhass; Wembley Conference Centre, London, England, 14 February 1999.
Ken Doherty (5); Ireland	8–10	John Higgins (2); Scotland
Afternoon: 31–83, 69–52, 60–66 (66), 34–61, 72–1, 27–80 (76), 76–31, 56–21; Evening: 0–78 (78), 20–88, 97–29 (90), 109–0 (109), 73–10 (59), 95–7 (95); 0–88 (64), 43–81, 15–69, 35–72
109	Highest break	78
1	Century breaks	0
4	50+ breaks	4

== Qualifying ==
David Gray won the qualifying tournament, known as the 1998 Benson & Hedges Championship at the time.

== Century breaks ==
Total: 12

- 123 – Mark Williams
- 121, 116, 113, 107, 105 – Tony Drago
- 115 – James Wattana
- 112, 104 – John Higgins
- 109, 104 – Ken Doherty
- 104 – Alan McManus

James Wattana's century was scored in the wild-card round.
