= 1998 World Snooker Championship =

Professional snooker tournament

1998 Embassy World Snooker Championship
Tournament information
- Dates: 18 April – 4 May 1998
- Venue: Crucible Theatre
- City: Sheffield
- Country: England
- Organisation: WPBSA
- Format: Ranking event
- Total prize fund: £1,323,000
- Winner's share: £220,000
- Highest break: John Higgins (SCO) (143); Jimmy White (ENG) (143)

Final
- Champion: John Higgins (SCO)
- Runner-up: Ken Doherty (IRL)
- Score: 18–12

The 1998 World Snooker Championship (also referred to as the 1998 Embassy World Snooker Championship for the purposes of sponsorship) was a professional ranking snooker tournament that took place between 18 April and 4 May 1998 at the Crucible Theatre in Sheffield, England.

John Higgins won his first World title by defeating defending champion Ken Doherty 18–12 in the final. Doherty became another World Champion who fell to the Crucible curse and could not defend his first World title. However, Doherty has come closer than any other first-time champion bar Joe Johnson to retaining his championship. The tournament was sponsored by cigarette brand Embassy.

== Prize fund ==
The winner of the event received £220,000 from a total prize fund of £1,323,000. The breakdown of prize money is shown below:

- Winner: £220,000
- Runner-up: £132,000
- Semi-final: £66,000
- Quarter-final: £33,000
- Last 16: £17,750
- Last 32: £12,000
- Highest break £19,000
- Maximum break £147,000
- Total £1,323,000

== Summary ==
=== First round ===
The first round took place from 18 to 22 April, each match played as the best of 19 frames over two sessions. Eight players made their Crucible debut this year: Simon Bedford, David Gray, Quinten Hann, Matthew Stevens, Terry Murphy, Alfie Burden, Peter Lines, and Jason Prince.

The defending champion Ken Doherty, who had won the 1997 Malta Grand Prix earlier that season, led Lee Walker 6–3.

Dave Harold took a 2–0 lead against Anthony Hamilton, who levelled the match with breaks of 53 and 108 and went on to lead 5–3 with three consecutive breaks of 72, 102 and 100. Leading 9–8, Hamilton required two snookers in frame 18. He got one and Harold made a foul that gave Hamilton a free ball. After a miss on the green, Hamilton cleared the remaining five colours and won the match 10–8. "I've been in a few pressure situations this season and that stood me in good stead at the end," Hamilton commented.

John Higgins, recently a winner of the 1998 British Open, built a 6–3 lead against Jason Ferguson. Having trailed by five frames at 1–6, Ferguson tied the match at 8–8, but Higgins took the last two for victory.

James Wattana needed a win in the first round to secure a position in the top 16 going into the next season. He led Fergal O'Brien 6–3 at the end of the first day of play. Wattana was 8–4 and 9–6 in front. At 9–7, needing just one more frame to claim victory, he attempted a maximum break which ended on 57 points. O'Brien stole the frame on a re-spotted black and went on to win the match in the deciding frame. "I just blew it. I had so many chances and so I didn't really deserve to win. I shouldn't really have gone for that maximum but I wasn't really thinking straight," Wattana said. Having lost five deciders during the season, he wished he could give up snooker for a couple of years.

Debutant Gray recovered from 3–6 behind to level the match against Alan McManus. McManus produced breaks of 111, 60 and 56 to go 9–7 in front. Gray, who made a 140 break during the match, won frame seventeen, but McManus sealed victory with a 30-point clearance in the eighteenth.

Facing debutant Hann, Mark Williams won five consecutive frames to go from 4–4 to 9–4, one away from victory. Hann forced a decider and built a 55-point lead before losing position. Williams took frame and match.

Qualifier and debutant Lines made a 141 clearance, but he trailed John Parrott, winner of the 1991 edition, 3–6. Parrott went on to win 10–4.

Ronnie O'Sullivan led Joe Swail 6–3 and won 10–5. "My cousin [Maria Catalano] has more chance of winning the women's tournament than I do of winning the men's title," O'Sullivan said. "I've certainly got to improve if I want to get any further. If I play well, I'll beat anyone. If I play badly, I'll lose to the world No. 201. It's as simple as that." Guy Hodgson, writing for The Independent, claimed that the fact that O'Sullivan found snooker "simple at times" was "both his strength and his Achilles heel". "When things are dumped in your lap they can be taken for granted and when Rocker Ronnie temporarily becomes detached from his talent he does not always have the gritty determination to reconstruct the link. Exasperation can be easier to grasp than perspiration," he added.

Darren Morgan trailed qualifier and debutant Prince 4–5.

The 1997 Scottish Masters winner Nigel Bond took a 4–2 lead against Mark King, but then lost eight of the next nine frames for a 5–10 defeat. "There was just nothing there. As the season has gone on my confidence has drained away," Bond said.

Peter Ebdon, runner-up in 1996, produced two centuries and further breaks of 82, 99 and 76 to eliminate debutant Murphy 10–3.

Jimmy White, who had lost fourteen consecutive matches against the six-time World Champion Stephen Hendry, won the first seven frames of his first-round match against him and finished the first session 8–1 in front. At the beginning of the second session, Hendry stole the first frame with a 72 clearance and also won the following two to edge closer at 4–8. White took the next two for victory. "With Stephen [Hendry] you've never beaten him until you've shaken his hand. I tried to finish it too quickly but I thought 'chill out, you're going to get an opening' and I did," White said. Hendry commented: "If Jimmy [White] had played like that in any of the finals he'd be world champion by now. That's the best he's ever played against me." It was the first time since his debut in 1986 that Hendry lost in the first round and it was also the first quarter-final stage not to feature him since 1988. Hendry's eight-year run as the world number one ended and he was replaced by Higgins.

=== Second round ===
The second round took place from 23 to 27 April, each match played as the best of 25 frames over three sessions.

Hamilton built a 6–2 lead in the first session of his match against the world number two Higgins. At the following day, Higgins produced a break of 131 in the first frame and went on to win the session by the same scoreline to level at 8–8. The next two frames were shared, and Higgins then produced breaks of 114, 71, 111, and 109 to take four in a row and win the match 13–9. "In past years I'd have gone to bed, sulked and probably lost 13–4. This time I made myself get up early and put in some practice," Higgins said.

Facing Davis, Williams won the first session 5–3 and produced breaks of 63, 43, 102, and 71 in the second to widen his lead. Davis was in first in the next two frames, but he made mistakes that allowed Williams to further extend his advantage to eight frames at 11–3. Davis produced breaks of 75 and 52 to secure the last two frames of the second session and narrow the deficit. Williams sealed victory with a 13–8 result. "I thought Mark [Williams] was amazing. He's casual and devastating at the same time. He makes a difficult game look easy. I made it look even more difficult than it is," Davis said.

Doherty led Lee 10–3, before Lee won five frames in a row to narrow the deficit to only two frames at 8–10. A missed pot on a red allowed Doherty back in frame 19 and he also took the next two for a 13–8 victory.

White produced breaks of 83, 87, and 78 in the first three frames of his match against Morgan, who had reached the quarter-finals of the World Championship on two occasions. White made a total clearance of 143 as he extended his lead at 6–1, before Morgan won the last frame with a century break of 112. White won the first frame of the following day with a clearance of 138 and made further breaks of 67, 89, 54, and 118 as he won the match 13–3. "I've played Hendry, Davis and a lot of good players and those are the best two sessions of snooker that I've ever faced," Morgan stated.

Parrott led Drago 5–3 and produced a century break as he took five consecutive frames for a 10–3 lead. He advanced to the next round with a 13–7 result.

Going into the last session, Ebdon held a 12–4 lead against O'Brien. O'Brien took the first frame of the third session with a 67 break, but Ebdon produced a 124 clearance to win the match.

O'Sullivan led McManus 7–1. McManus took three of the eight frames of the afternoon session to avoid losing the match with a session to spare. At the resumption, O'Sullivan produced a century break of 134 to seal victory with a 13–4 scoreline in under ten minutes.

Stevens and King shared the first two sessions. Resuming at 8–8, Steven made breaks of 52, 100, and 61 as he took five of the following six frames for victory.

=== Quarter-finals ===
The quarter-finals took place on 28 and 29 April, each match played as the best of 25 frames over three sessions.

Having led Stevens 9–8 and 10–9, Doherty compiled breaks of 53 and 70 to win back-to-back frames and move one away from victory at 12–9. Stevens took the next frame, but Doherty progressed to the semi-finals with a break of 73. "I've got to the semi-finals without too much notice and it suits me. I'm doing my own thing like I did last year and, at the end of the day, the tournament is more important that the media attention," Doherty said.

Williams built an 8–5 lead, but Ebdon recovered and tied the scores at 9–9. The next four frames were shared, but Williams then won back-to-back frames for a 13–11 victory. "I'm fed up of these close matches," said Williams, whose highest break of the match was a 67.

Facing Parrott, Higgins made his 100th career century break, a 102 in the last frame of the second session, which ended with the scores level at 8–8. At the resumption the next morning, Higgins compiled back-to-back centuries of 143 and 139. They meant that the tournament had produced a record-breaking total of 49 century breaks. Parrott took three frames in a row to lead 11–10, but Higgins also won three consecutive frames to progress with a 13–11 result. "He'll take a fair bit of stopping. Ken Doherty's going along quietly, minding his own business, but I tipped John [Higgins] before the start of the tournament and I've seen nothing to change that," Parrott said.

O'Sullivan won seven of the eight frames played in the first session. White halved the deficit at 9–6. "O'Sullivan spent much of the day smiling ironically at the hopelessness of his play," Guy Hodgson wrote, reporting for The Independent. O'Sullivan produced a 55 break to win the last frame of the session, which ended 10–6. He made further breaks of 64 and 118 to win 13–7.

=== Semi-finals ===
The semi-finals took place from 30 April to 2 May, played as the best of 33 frames over four sessions.

=== Final ===
The best-of-35-frame final took place over four sessions on 3 and 4 May between Doherty and Higgins. Referee Lawrie Annandale officiated the final.

== Main draw ==
The draw for the main tournament is shown below. The numbers in parentheses after the players' names denote the seedings. The match winners are shown in bold.

**First round** Best of 19 frames
18 April
**Ken Doherty (IRL) (1)**	**10**
Lee Walker (WAL)	8
22 April
**Stephen Lee (ENG) (16)**	**10**
Andy Hicks (ENG)	4
22 & 23 April
Alain Robidoux (CAN) (9)	8
**Matthew Stevens (WAL)**	**10**
20 & 21 April
Nigel Bond (ENG) (8)	5
**Mark King (ENG)**	**10**
21 April
**Peter Ebdon (ENG) (5)**	**10**
Terry Murphy (NIR)	3
18 & 19 April
James Wattana (THA) (12)	9
**Fergal O'Brien (IRL)**	**10**
19 & 20 April
**Steve Davis (ENG) (13)**	**10**
Simon Bedford (ENG)	6
19 & 20 April
**Mark Williams (WAL) (4)**	**10**
Quinten Hann (AUS)	9
18 & 19 April
**John Higgins (SCO) (3)**	**10**
Jason Ferguson (ENG)	8
18 & 19 April
**Anthony Hamilton (ENG) (14)**	**10**
Dave Harold (ENG)	8
18 & 19 April
**Tony Drago (MLT) (11)**	**10**
Alfie Burden (ENG)	8
20 & 21 April
**John Parrott (ENG) (6)**	**10**
Peter Lines (ENG)	4
21 & 22 April
**Ronnie O'Sullivan (ENG) (7)**	**10**
Joe Swail (NIR)	5
20 April
**Alan McManus (SCO) (10)**	**10**
David Gray (ENG)	8
21 & 22 April
**Darren Morgan (WAL) (15)**	**10**
Jason Prince (NIR)	8
22 & 23 April
Stephen Hendry (SCO) (2)	4
**Jimmy White (ENG)**	**10**

**Second round** Best of 25 frames
24 & 25 April
**Ken Doherty (IRL) (1)**	**13**
Stephen Lee (ENG) (16)	8
26 & 27 April
**Matthew Stevens (WAL)**	**13**
Mark King (ENG)	9
25, 26 & 27 April
**Peter Ebdon (ENG) (5)**	**13**
Fergal O'Brien (IRL)	5
23, 24 & 25 April
Steve Davis (ENG) (13)	6
**Mark Williams (WAL) (4)**	**13**
23 & 24 April
**John Higgins (SCO) (3)**	**13**
Anthony Hamilton (ENG) (14)	9
24 & 25 April
Tony Drago (MLT) (11)	7
**John Parrott (ENG) (6)**	**13**
26 & 27 April
**Ronnie O'Sullivan (ENG) (7)**	**13**
Alan McManus (SCO) (10)	4
25 & 26 April
Darren Morgan (WAL) (15)	3
**Jimmy White (ENG)**	**13**

**Quarter-finals**; Best of 25 frames
28 & 29 April
**Ken Doherty (IRL) (1)**	**13**
Matthew Stevens (WAL)	10
28 & 29 April
Peter Ebdon (ENG) (5)	11
**Mark Williams (WAL) (4)**	**13**
28 & 29 April
**John Higgins (SCO) (3)**	**13**
John Parrott (ENG) (6)	11
28 & 29 April
**Ronnie O'Sullivan (ENG) (7)**	**13**
Jimmy White (ENG)	7

**Semi-finals**; Best of 33 frames
30 April, 1 & 2 May
**Ken Doherty (IRL) (1)**	**17**
Mark Williams (WAL) (4)	14
30 April, 1 & 2 May
**John Higgins (SCO) (3)**	**17**
Ronnie O'Sullivan (ENG) (7)	9

**Final**; Best of 35 frames
3 & 4 May
Ken Doherty (IRL) (1)	12
**John Higgins (SCO) (3)**	**18**

=== Final: frame scores ===
Final: (Best of 35 frames) Crucible Theatre, Sheffield, 3 & 4 May 1998; Referee: Lawrie Annandale
Ken Doherty (IRL) (1)				12–**18**			**John Higgins (SCO)** (3)			
Session 1: 2–6
Frame	1	2	3	4	5	6	7	8	9	10
Doherty	**73**^{†} (59)	20	7	1	0	52 (52)	0	**89**^{†} (89)	N/A	N/A
Higgins	34	**80**^{†}	**86**^{†}	**71**^{†} (71)	**113**^{†} (66)	**73**^{†} (55)	**130**^{†} (130)	0	N/A	N/A
Session 2: 4–4 (6–10)
Frame	1	2	3	4	5	6	7	8	9	10
Doherty	**112**^{†} (112)	**66**^{†}	**97**^{†} (58)	2	4	5	0	**82**^{†}	N/A	N/A
Higgins	0	7	18	**66**^{†} (51)	**103**^{†} (103)	**86**^{†}	**138**^{†} (64, 74)	70	N/A	N/A
Session 3: 5–3 (11–13)
Frame	1	2	3	4	5	6	7	8	9	10
Doherty	**90**^{†} (69)	0	**61**^{†} (55)	0	**90**^{†} (86)	**99**^{†} (59)	48	**82**^{†}	N/A	N/A
Higgins	39	**89**^{†} (89)	6	**130**^{†} (130)	0	1	**58**^{†}	44	N/A	N/A
Session 4: 1–5 (12–**18**)
Frame	1	2	3	4	5	6	7	8	9	10
Doherty	14	0	58	**78**^{†}	19	8	N/A	N/A	N/A	N/A
Higgins	**60**^{†}	**128**^{†} (128)	**71**^{†}	41	**66**^{†}	**119**^{†} (118)	N/A	N/A	N/A	N/A
112				Highest break			130			
1				Century breaks			5			
9				50+ breaks			12			
John Higgins wins the 1998 Embassy World Snooker Championship; Breaks over 50 are shown in parentheses. † = Winner of frame

== Qualifying results ==
Fifteen qualifying rounds were played.

=== Rounds 9-11 ===
Results for rounds 9 to 11 are shown below.

Round 9 Best of 19 frames
Evan Munro (SCO)	3
Leo Fernandez (IRL)	10
Michael O'Sullivan (ENG)	2
Robert Milkins (ENG)	10
John Burns (ENG)	2
Philip Williams (WAL)	10
Steve Meakin (ENG)	10
Neal Tomkins (ENG)	7

Round 10; Best of 19 frames
Leo Fernandez (IRL)	10
Robert Milkins (ENG)	8
Philip Williams (WAL)	10
Steve Meakin (ENG)	6

Round 11; Best of 19 frames
Leo Fernandez (IRL)	10
Philip Williams (WAL)	6

Round 9 Best of 19 frames
Brian Rowswell (ENG)	10
Sean Lanigan (ENG)	7
Hugh Abernethy (SCO)	8
Joe Jogia (ENG)	10
Chris Shade (SCO)	10
Nick Manning (ENG)	3
Jeff Cundy (ENG)	10
Dylan Leary (NIR)	7

Round 10; Best of 19 frames
Brian Rowswell (ENG)	10
Joe Jogia (ENG)	4
Chris Shade (SCO)	9
Jeff Cundy (ENG)	10

Round 11; Best of 19 frames
Brian Rowswell (ENG)	10
Jeff Cundy (ENG)	9

Round 9 Best of 19 frames
Stuart Reardon (ENG)	10
Jason Weston (ENG)	8
Surinder Gill (ENG)	10
Stuart Parnell (ENG)	5
Ali Carter (ENG)	10
Scott Cooney (ENG)	8
Bjorn Haneveer (BEL)	10
James McGouran (ENG)	6

Round 10; Best of 19 frames
Stuart Reardon (ENG)	4
Surinder Gill (ENG)	10
Ali Carter (ENG)	5
Bjorn Haneveer (BEL)	10

Round 11; Best of 19 frames
Surinder Gill (ENG)	5
Bjorn Haneveer (BEL)	10

Round 9 Best of 19 frames
Leigh Robinson (ENG)	6
Nick Terry (ENG)	10
Garry Baldrey (ENG)	10
Graham Horne (SCO)	8
Mario Geudens (BEL)	7
Barry Pinches (ENG)	10
Nic Barrow (ENG)	10
Mario Wehrmann (NED)	4

Round 10; Best of 19 frames
Nick Terry (ENG)	10
Garry Baldrey (ENG)	1
Barry Pinches (ENG)	10
Nic Barrow (ENG)	3

Round 11; Best of 19 frames
Nick Terry (ENG)	2
Barry Pinches (ENG)	10

Round 9 Best of 19 frames
Mark Johnston-Allen (ENG)	10
Joe O'Boye (IRL)	5
Justin Buckingham (ENG)	4
Simon Bedford (ENG)	10
Jason Wallace (ENG)	10
Andrew Cairns (ENG)	9
Oliver King (ENG)	10
Robin Hull (FIN)	7

Round 10; Best of 19 frames
Mark Johnston-Allen (ENG)	6
Simon Bedford (ENG)	10
Jason Wallace (ENG)	10
Oliver King (ENG)	4

Round 11; Best of 19 frames
Simon Bedford (ENG)	10
Jason Wallace (ENG)	2

Round 9 Best of 19 frames
Munraj Pal (ENG)	10
Les Dodd (ENG)	8
Christopher McGee (ENG)	10
Lee Mallin (ENG)	6
Gary Lees (ENG)	10
Paul McPhillips (SCO)	6
Joe Delaney (IRL)	10
Ryan Mitchell (ENG)	4

Round 10; Best of 19 frames
Munraj Pal (ENG)	10
Christopher McGee (ENG)	4
Gary Lees (ENG)	8
Joe Delaney (IRL)	10

Round 11; Best of 19 frames
Munraj Pal (ENG)	8
Joe Delaney (IRL)	10

Round 9 Best of 19 frames
Stuart Bingham (ENG)	10
Ian Hurdman (ENG)	1
Darryn Walker (ENG)	9
Adrian Rosa (ENG)	10
Mike Hallett (ENG)	10
Garoid O'Connor (ENG)	4
Marco Fu (HKG)	10
Paul Sweeny (ENG)	5

Round 10; Best of 19 frames
Stuart Bingham (ENG)	7
Adrian Rosa (ENG)	10
Mike Hallett (ENG)	2
Marco Fu (HKG)	10

Round 11; Best of 19 frames
Adrian Rosa (ENG)	10
Marco Fu (HKG)	8

Round 9 Best of 19 frames
Andrew Higginson (ENG)	10
David McDonnell (IRL)	6
Simon Parker (ENG)	10
Stephen Murphy (ENG)	4
Ian Sargeant (WAL)	10
Steve Day (ENG)	8
David Coles (ENG)	5
Andy Neck (ENG)	10

Round 10; Best of 19 frames
Andrew Higginson (ENG)	10
Simon Parker (ENG)	6
Ian Sargeant (ENG)	10
Andy Neck (ENG)	0

Round 11; Best of 19 frames
Andrew Higginson (ENG)	10
Ian Sargeant (WAL)	7

=== Rounds 12-15 ===
Results for rounds 12 to 15 are shown below. Round 15 was held at Telford international Centre on 20 and 21 March.

Round 12; Best of 19 frames
Leigh Griffin (ENG)	10
Leo Fernandez (IRL)	7
John Lardner (SCO)	10
Brian Rowswell (ENG)	5
Troy Shaw (ENG)	5
Bjorn Haneveer (BEL)	10
Joe Perry (ENG)	10
Barry Pinches (ENG)	7
Mark Gray (ENG)	9
Simon Bedford (ENG)	10
Peter McCullagh (ENG)	1
Joe Delaney (IRL)	10
David Gray (ENG)	10
Adrian Rosa (ENG)	5
Craig MacGillivray (SCO)	5
Andrew Higginson (ENG)	10

Round 13; Best of 19 frames
Jonathan Birch (ENG)	3
Lee Walker (WAL)	10
Karl Broughton (ENG)	4
Leigh Griffin (ENG)	10
David Roe (ENG)	10
Ian Brumby (ENG)	7
Graeme Dott (SCO)	10
John Lardner (SCO)	3
Drew Henry (SCO)	10
Sean Storey (ENG)	5
Matthew Stevens (WAL)	10
Stephen O'Connor (IRL)	5
Paul Hunter (ENG)	10
Lee Richardson (ENG)	4
Michael Judge (IRL)	8
Steve Judd (ENG)	10
Joe Johnson (ENG)	10
Martin Dziewialtowski (SCO)	6
Nick Pearce (ENG)	10
Bjorn Haneveer (BEL)	5
Willie Thorne (ENG)	3
Nick Walker (NIR)	10
Shokat Ali (PAK)	2
Joe Perry (ENG)	10
Euan Henderson (SCO)	3
Simon Bedford (ENG)	10
Tony Jones (ENG)	10
Paul Wykes (ENG)	9
Wayne Jones (ENG)	3
Quinten Hann (AUS)	10
Anthony Davies (WAL)	10
Jamie Woodman (ENG)	1
Jason Ferguson (ENG)	10
Darren Clarke (ENG)	6
Chris Scanlon (ENG)	9
Marcus Campbell (SCO)	10
Jamie Burnett (SCO)	6
Joe Delaney (IRL)	10
Dennis Taylor (NIR)	6
Gary Ponting (ENG)	10
Mark Bennett (WAL)	6
Alfie Burden (ENG)	10
Dean Reynolds (ENG)	8
Wayne Brown (ENG)	10
David Finbow (ENG)	7
Peter Lines (ENG)	10
Dene O'Kane (NZL)	5
Stuart Pettman (ENG)	10
Paul Davies (WAL)	9
Matthew Couch (ENG)	10
Stefan Mazrocis (ENG)	10
Karl Payne (ENG)	6
Tony Chappel (WAL)	5
Karl Burrows (ENG)	10
Mark Davis (ENG)	4
David Gray (ENG)	10
Jason Prince (NIR)	10
John Read (ENG)	4
Jimmy Michie (ENG)	5
Andrew Higginson (ENG)	10
Gerard Greene (NIR)	5
Bradley Jones (ENG)	10
Dominic Dale (WAL)	7
Ian McCulloch (ENG)	10

Round 14; Best of 19 frames
Lee Walker (WAL)	10
Leigh Griffin (ENG)	5
David Roe (ENG)	10
Graeme Dott (SCO)	9
Drew Henry (SCO)	3
Matthew Stevens (WAL)	10
Paul Hunter (ENG)	10
Steve Judd (ENG)	5
Joe Johnson (ENG)	8
Nick Pearce (ENG)	10
Nick Walker (NIR)	6
Joe Perry (ENG)	10
Simon Bedford (ENG)	10
Tony Jones (ENG)	7
Quinten Hann (AUS)	10
Anthony Davies (WAL)	3
Jason Ferguson (ENG)	10
Marcus Campbell (SCO)	6
Joe Delaney (IRL)	10
Gary Ponting (ENG)	8
Alfie Burden (ENG)	10
Wayne Brown (ENG)	2
Peter Lines (ENG)	10
Stuart Pettman (ENG)	5
Matthew Couch (ENG)	10
Stefan Mazrocis (ENG)	2
Karl Burrows (ENG)	9
David Gray (ENG)	10
Jason Prince (NIR)	10
Andrew Higginson (ENG)	6
Bradley Jones (ENG)	10
Ian McCulloch (ENG)	9

Round 15; Best of 19 frames
Billy Snaddon (SCO)	9
Lee Walker (WAL)	10
Andy Hicks (ENG)	10
David Roe (ENG)	1
Neal Foulds (ENG)	3
Matthew Stevens (WAL)	10
Mark King (ENG)	10
Paul Hunter (ENG)	8
Terry Murphy (NIR)	10
Nick Pearce (ENG)	2
Fergal O'Brien (IRL)	10
Joe Perry (ENG)	7
Gary Wilkinson (ENG)	9
Simon Bedford (ENG)	10
Brian Morgan (ENG)	6
Quinten Hann (AUS)	10
Mick Price (ENG)	7
Jason Ferguson (ENG)	10
Dave Harold (ENG)	10
Joe Delaney (IRL)	7
Rod Lawler (ENG)	3
Alfie Burden (ENG)	10
Steve James (ENG)	6
Peter Lines (ENG)	10
Joe Swail (NIR)	10
Matthew Couch (ENG)	3
Chris Small (SCO)	5
David Gray (ENG)	10
Martin Clark (ENG)	8
Jason Prince (NIR)	10
Jimmy White (ENG)	10
Bradley Jones (ENG)	5

== Century breaks ==
A total of 59 century breaks were made during the main stage of the tournament, a new record which lasted until 2002. John Higgins' 14 centuries in the tournament was a new record, beating the 12 made by Stephen Hendry in 1995.

- 143, 139, 131, 130, 130, 128, 119, 118, 114, 111, 109, 104, 103, 102 – John Higgins
- 143, 138, 118, 106 – Jimmy White
- 141, 134, 118, 104, 100 – Ronnie O'Sullivan
- 141 – Peter Lines
- 140, 107 – David Gray
- 137, 134, 131, 112 – Ken Doherty
- 137 – Dave Harold
- 137 – James Wattana
- 133, 109 – Stephen Lee
- 127, 100 – Matthew Stevens
- 124, 117, 109, 108, 108, 104 – Peter Ebdon
- 120, 108, 104, 102 – John Parrott
- 115, 108, 102, 100 – Anthony Hamilton
- 115, 105 – Alfie Burden
- 112 – Darren Morgan
- 111 – Alan McManus
- 105, 100 – Fergal O'Brien
- 103, 100 – Mark King
- 102 – Mark Williams
