= 2003 Scottish Open (snooker) =

2003 Regal Scottish Open
Tournament information
- Dates: 5–13 April 2003
- Venue: Royal Highland Centre
- City: Edinburgh
- Country: Scotland
- Organisation: WPBSA
- Format: Ranking event
- Total prize fund: £597,200
- Winner's share: £82,500
- Highest break: Ali Carter (ENG) (142)

Final
- Champion: David Gray (ENG)
- Runner-up: Mark Selby (ENG)
- Score: 9–7

The 2003 Scottish Open (officially the 2003 Regal Scottish Open) was a professional ranking snooker tournament that took place between 5–13 April 2003 at the Royal Highland Centre in Edinburgh, Scotland. It was the seventh and penultimate ranking event of the 2002/2003 season.

David Gray won his first ranking title by defeating Mark Selby 9–7 in the final. This was Gray's only ranking final victory, and was Selby's first appearance in a ranking final. The defending champion, Stephen Lee, was defeated in the quarter-finals by John Higgins.

This was the final tournament held under the Scottish Open name, being re-branded the following season as the Players Championship before being discontinued. The tournament would be revived under the Scottish Open name in 2016.

== Prize fund ==
The breakdown of prize money for this year is shown below:

Winner: £82,500
Runner-up: £42,500
Semi-final: £21,250
Quarter-final: £11,700
Last 16: £9,600
Last 32: £7,800
Last 48: £4,000
Last 64: £3,150

Last 80: £2,150
Last 96: £1,450

Stage one highest break: £1,800
Stage two highest break: £7,500

Stage one maximum break: £5,000
Stage two maximum break: £20,000

Total: £597,200

== Main draw ==
Last 48; Best of 9 frames
24	(Republic of Ireland) Michael Judge	2
43	(England) Ian McCulloch	5
30	(England) Nigel Bond	3
33	(England) Robert Milkins	5
28	(Malta) Tony Drago	3
(England) Rory McLeod	5
26	(Wales) Anthony Davies	5
(Wales) Ryan Day	2
25	(England) Steve Davis	5
52	(Scotland) Stephen Maguire	2
19	(England) David Gray	5
(England) David Gilbert	3
27	(Hong Kong) Marco Fu	4
38	(England) Alfie Burden	5
29	(Scotland) Chris Small	3
35	(England) Michael Holt	5
22	(Scotland) Drew Henry	5
(England) Shaun Murphy	3
18	(England) John Parrott	4
36	(Northern Ireland) Patrick Wallace	5
23	(Republic of Ireland) Fergal O'Brien	1
(England) Sean Storey	5
17	(England) Anthony Hamilton	5
(England) Wayne Brown	1
32	(Thailand) James Wattana	5
(Iceland) Kristján Helgason	4
20	(Wales) Dominic Dale	2
53	(England) Mark Selby	5
21	(England) Dave Harold	5
57	(England) Stuart Bingham	3
31	(England) Ali Carter	5
62	(England) Nick Dyson	1

Last 32; Best of 9 frames
1	(England) Stephen Lee	5
43	(England) Ian McCulloch	2
11	(England) Mark King	5
33	(England) Robert Milkins	3
10	(England) Jimmy White	5
(England) Rory McLeod	2
5	(Scotland) John Higgins	5
26	(Wales) Anthony Davies	0
7	(Scotland) Stephen Hendry	5
25	(England) Steve Davis	2
13	(England) Joe Perry	1
19	(England) David Gray	5
16	(Northern Ireland) Joe Swail	5
38	(England) Alfie Burden	2
4	(Wales) Mark Williams	5
35	(England) Michael Holt	3
3	(England) Ronnie O'Sullivan	5
22	(Scotland) Drew Henry	2
15	(Scotland) Alan McManus	5
36	(Northern Ireland) Patrick Wallace	4
14	(Australia) Quinten Hann	5
(England) Sean Storey	0
6	(Republic of Ireland) Ken Doherty	5
17	(England) Anthony Hamilton	2
8	(Wales) Matthew Stevens	5
32	(Thailand) James Wattana	3
9	(England) Paul Hunter	3
53	(England) Mark Selby	5
12	(Scotland) Graeme Dott	4
21	(England) Dave Harold	5
2	(England) Peter Ebdon	2
31	(England) Ali Carter	5

Last 16; Best of 9 frames
1	(England) Stephen Lee	5
11	(England) Mark King	1
10	(England) Jimmy White	2
5	(Scotland) John Higgins	5
7	(Scotland) Stephen Hendry	4
19	(England) David Gray	5
16	(Northern Ireland) Joe Swail	5
4	(Wales) Mark Williams	3
3	(England) Ronnie O'Sullivan	1
15	(Scotland) Alan McManus	5
14	(Australia) Quinten Hann	3
6	(Republic of Ireland) Ken Doherty	5
8	(Wales) Matthew Stevens	2
53	(England) Mark Selby	5
21	(England) Dave Harold	4
31	(England) Ali Carter	5

Quarter-finals; Best of 9 frames
1	(England) Stephen Lee	1
5	(Scotland) John Higgins	5
19	(England) David Gray	5
16	(Northern Ireland) Joe Swail	4
15	(Scotland) Alan McManus	3
6	(Republic of Ireland) Ken Doherty	5
53	(England) Mark Selby	5
31	(England) Ali Carter	3

Semi-finals; Best of 11 frames
5	(Scotland) John Higgins	3
19	(England) David Gray	6
6	(Republic of Ireland) Ken Doherty	5
53	(England) Mark Selby	6

Final; Best of 17 frames
19	(England) David Gray	9
53	(England) Mark Selby	7

== Final ==
Final: Best of 17 frames. Royal Highland Centre, Edinburgh, Scotland, 13 April 2003.
David Gray (19); England	9–7	Mark Selby (53); England
Afternoon: 73–32 (65), 77–0 (60), 47–34, 47–76, 78–47 (52), 70–24, 0–63, 41–66 (60); Evening: 9–102, 24–67, 77–30, 71–62, 21–70, 57–75, 71–56, 65–18
65	Highest break	60
0	Century breaks	0
3	50+ breaks	1

== Qualifying ==
=== Round 1 ===
Best of 9 frames

(Wales) Paul Davies	4–5	(Republic of Ireland) Leo Fernandez
(England) Tony Jones	1–5	(Republic of Ireland) Colm Gilcreest
(England) Andrew Higginson	5–3	(Wales) James Reynolds
(England) Jeff Cundy	5–2	(England) Jamie Cope
(England) Paul Davison	5–1	(England) Ricky Walden
(England) Rory McLeod	5–2	(Canada) Bob Chaperon
(Wales) Ryan Day	5–0	(England) Matthew Selt
(England) Jason Ferguson	3–5	(Scotland) Hugh Abernethy
(England) Craig Butler	3–5	(Wales) David John
(England) Rod Lawler	5–1	(India) Manan Chandra
(England) Adrian Gunnell	5–2	(England) Jason Weston
(Scotland) Euan Henderson	w/d–w/o	(England) David Gilbert
(England) Stephen Kershaw	0–5	(England) Munraj Pal
(England) Luke Fisher	4–5	(England) Simon Bedford
(Wales) Lee Walker	w/o–w/d	(England) Eddie Manning
(Canada) Alain Robidoux	1–5	(England) Lee Spick

(England) Shaun Murphy	5–2	(Thailand) Atthasit Mahitthi
(England) Matthew Couch	4–5	(Thailand) Kwan Poomjang
(England) John Read	5–1	(Netherlands) Mario Wehrman
(Northern Ireland) Jason Prince	5–2	(Wales) Peter Roscoe
(England) Paul Wykes	5–1	(China) Jin Long
(England) Sean Storey	5–2	(Wales) David Donovan
(Thailand) Phaitoon Phonbun	5–3	(China) Pang Weiguo
(England) Wayne Brown	5–2	(Netherlands) Stefan Mazrocis
(Iceland) Kristján Helgason	w/o–w/d	(Wales) Matthew Farrant
(England) Neal Foulds	2–5	(England) Darren Clarke
(England) Andrew Norman	4–5	(Australia) Johl Younger
(England) Antony Bolsover	5–3	(England) Jimmy Robertson
(England) Peter Lines	3–5	(England) Mark Gray
(Scotland) Martin Dziewialtowski	5–4	(Scotland) David McLellan
(England) Joe Johnson	0–5	(England) Nick Pearce
(England) Troy Shaw	5–2	(England) Justin Astley

=== Round 2–4 ===
Round 2 Best of 9 frames
(Republic of Ireland) Leo Fernandez	5
(Republic of Ireland) Colm Gilcreest	0
(England) Andrew Higginson	5
(England) Jeff Cundy	0
(England) Paul Davison	0
(England) Rory McLeod	5
(Wales) Ryan Day	5
(Scotland) Hugh Abernethy	2
(Wales) David John	4
(England) Rod Lawler	5
(England) Adrian Gunnell	2
(England) David Gilbert	5
(England) Munraj Pal	2
(England) Simon Bedford	5
(Wales) Lee Walker	5
(England) Lee Spick	4
(England) Shaun Murphy	5
(Thailand) Kwan Poomjang	3
(England) John Read	5
(Northern Ireland) Jason Prince	2
(England) Paul Wykes	0
(England) Sean Storey	5
(Thailand) Phaitoon Phonbun	3
(England) Wayne Brown	5
(Iceland) Kristján Helgason	5
(England) Darren Clarke	2
(Australia) Johl Younger	2
(England) Antony Bolsover	5
(England) Mark Gray	5
(Scotland) Martin Dziewialtowski	4
(England) Nick Pearce	3
(England) Troy Shaw	5

Round 3 Best of 9 frames
(England) Andy Hicks	2
(Republic of Ireland) Leo Fernandez	5
(England) Barry Hawkins	5
(England) Andrew Higginson	4
(England) Dave Finbow	1
(England) Rory McLeod	5
(England) Barry Pinches	1
(Wales) Ryan Day	5
(Scotland) Stephen Maguire	5
(England) Rod Lawler	1
(Belgium) Bjorn Haneveer	3
(England) David Gilbert	5
(England) Nick Walker	5
(England) Simon Bedford	3
(Northern Ireland) Gerard Greene	4
(Wales) Lee Walker	5
(Wales) Darren Morgan	1
(England) Shaun Murphy	5
(England) Mike Dunn	5
(England) John Read	2
(England) Jimmy Michie	0
(England) Sean Storey	5
(England) Stuart Pettman	3
(England) Wayne Brown	5
(England) Bradley Jones	2
(Iceland) Kristján Helgason	5
(England) Mark Selby	5
(England) Antony Bolsover	0
(England) Stuart Bingham	5
(England) Mark Gray	2
(England) Nick Dyson	5
(England) Troy Shaw	1

Round 4 Best of 9 frames
(England) Ian McCulloch	5
(Republic of Ireland) Leo Fernandez	2
(England) Robert Milkins	5
(England) Barry Hawkins	3
(Scotland) Jamie Burnett	4
(England) Rory McLeod	5
(England) Mark Davis	3
(Wales) Ryan Day	5
(England) Gary Wilkinson	3
(Scotland) Stephen Maguire	5
(England) Brian Morgan	3
(England) David Gilbert	5
(England) Alfie Burden	5
(England) Nick Walker	4
(England) Michael Holt	5
(Wales) Lee Walker	2
(England) Jonathan Birch	2
(England) Shaun Murphy	5
(Northern Ireland) Patrick Wallace	5
(England) Mike Dunn	3
(Finland) Robin Hull	1
(England) Sean Storey	5
(Scotland) Marcus Campbell	4
(England) Wayne Brown	5
(England) David Roe	0
(Iceland) Kristján Helgason	5
(Pakistan) Shokat Ali	4
(England) Mark Selby	5
(Scotland) Billy Snaddon	4
(England) Stuart Bingham	5
(Northern Ireland) Terry Murphy	1
(England) Nick Dyson	5

== Century breaks ==
=== Qualifying stage centuries ===
- 141 – Stuart Bingham
- 138 – Shaun Murphy
- 136 – Rory McLeod
- 135 – Michael Holt
- 133 – Lee Spick
- 128, 113 – Kristjan Helgason
- 121 – David Gray
- 120 – Bradley Jones
- 120 – Wayne Brown
- 119 – Johl Younger
- 119 – Tony Drago
- 117 – David Gilbert
- 115 – Adrian Gunnell
- 114 – Ian McCulloch
- 112, 104, 101 – Ryan Day
- 110 – Robin Hull
- 108, 100 – Mark Gray
- 103 – Nick Walker

=== Televised stage centuries ===
- 142, 116 – Ali Carter
- 136, 120, 102, 101, 100 – Stephen Hendry
- 134, 100 – Mark Selby
- 131, 124 – Ken Doherty
- 128, 102 – John Higgins
- 117 – Mark King
- 101 – Matthew Stevens
- 101 – Ian McCulloch
- 101 – Quinten Hann
- 101 – Anthony Hamilton
