= 2002 Thailand Masters =

Thailand Masters
Tournament information
- Dates: 4–10 March 2002
- Venue: Merchant Court Hotel
- City: Bangkok
- Country: Thailand
- Organisation: WPBSA
- Format: Ranking event
- Total prize fund: £476,300
- Winner's share: £67,500

Final
- Champion: Mark Williams (WAL)
- Runner-up: Stephen Lee (ENG)
- Score: 9–4

The 2002 Singha Thailand Masters was a professional ranking snooker tournament that took place between 4–10 March 2002 at the Merchant Court Hotel in Bangkok, Thailand. This was the last edition of the tournament as a ranking event.

Mark Williams won in the final 9–4 against Stephen Lee. The defending champion, Ken Doherty, was defeated by Lee in the quarter-finals.

== Main draw ==
Last 32; Best of 9 frames
(Republic of Ireland) Ken Doherty	5
(England) Joe Perry	3
(England) Steve Davis	1
(England) Dave Harold	5
(Scotland) Graeme Dott	1
(Australia) Quinten Hann	5
(England) Stephen Lee	5
(England) John Parrott	4
(Wales) Matthew Stevens	5
(Wales) Anthony Davies	2
(England) Jimmy White	5
(England) Stuart Bingham	2
(Northern Ireland) Joe Swail	5
(Hong Kong) Marco Fu	0
(Scotland) John Higgins	5
(England) Michael Holt	1
(Wales) Mark Williams	5
(England) David Gray	2
(England) Paul Hunter	5
(England) Barry Pinches	1
(Republic of Ireland) Fergal O'Brien	5
(England) Mark Davis	2
(England) Peter Ebdon	5
(England) Stuart Pettman	1
(Scotland) Stephen Hendry	5
(England) Barry Hawkins	3
(Scotland) Alan McManus	5
(Wales) Lee Walker	1
(England) Mark King	5
(Malta) Tony Drago	1
(England) Ronnie O'Sullivan	5
(Thailand) James Wattana	2

Last 16; Best of 9 frames
(Republic of Ireland) Ken Doherty	5
(England) Dave Harold	1
(Australia) Quinten Hann	3
(England) Stephen Lee	5
(England) Matthew Stevens	5
(England) Jimmy White	2
(Northern Ireland) Joe Swail	4
(Scotland) John Higgins	5
(Wales) Mark Williams	5
(England) Paul Hunter	0
(Republic of Ireland) Fergal O'Brien	5
(England) Peter Ebdon	1
(Scotland) Stephen Hendry	5
(Scotland) Alan McManus	4
(England) Mark King	4
(England) Ronnie O'Sullivan	5

Quarter-finals; Best of 9 frames
(Republic of Ireland) Ken Doherty	4
(England) Stephen Lee	5
(Wales) Matthew Stevens	5
(Scotland) John Higgins	3
(Wales) Mark Williams	5
(Republic of Ireland) Fergal O'Brien	1
(Scotland) Stephen Hendry	3
(England) Ronnie O'Sullivan	5

Semi-finals; Best of 9 frames
(England) Stephen Lee	5
(Wales) Matthew Stevens	2
(Wales) Mark Williams	5
(England) Ronnie O'Sullivan	2

Final; Best of 17 frames
(England) Stephen Lee	4
(Wales) Mark Williams	9

== Final ==
Final: Best of 17 frames. Merchant Court Hotel, Bangkok, Thailand. 10 March 2002.
Mark Williams; Wales	9–4	Stephen Lee; England
Afternoon: 57–38, 78–0 (78), 68–0 (64), 42–65, 6–76 (69), 89–43, 67–5, 73–40 (52); Evening: 66–4, 90–37 (90), 47–58 (50), 5–70, 67–28
90	Highest break	69
0	Century breaks	0
4	50+ breaks	2
