= David Gray (snooker player) =

English snooker player

Personal information
- Nickname: Casper
- Born: 9 February 1979 (age 47) Lower Morden, London, England

Sport
- Country: England
- Sport: Snooker
- Professional: 1996–2010
- Highest ranking: 12 (2003/04)
- Maximum breaks: 2

Tournament wins
- Ranking: 1

David Gray (born 9 February 1979) is an English former professional snooker player from London.

Gray turned professional in 1996 after becoming the youngest-ever winner of the English Amateur Championship. He went on to win the 2003 Scottish Open, break into the top 16 in the world rankings and reach the final of the 2004 UK Championship (where he made his first of two competitive maximums). Despite these successes early in his career, his form declined until he eventually dropped off the tour in 2010 aged 31.

== Career ==
Gray turned professional in 1996, after becoming the youngest winner of the English amateur title in 1995. Gray first qualified for the World Championship aged 19 in 1998 where he narrowly lost in round one to Alan McManus. He first demonstrated his potential by beating Ronnie O'Sullivan 10–9 in the first round of the 2000 World Championship, a match in which O'Sullivan scored five centuries. However, Gray was unable to repeat this success in the second round and lost 1–13 to Dominic Dale, scoring just 208 points, a record low for a best-of-25 match.

After winning the non-ranking 1998 Benson & Hedges Championship and following his World Championship performance in 2000, Gray was a consistent tournament quarter-finalist over the next eighteen months, but did not reach his first ranking final until the 2002 Scottish Open. In this tournament, Gray eliminated defending champion Peter Ebdon 6–3 in the semi-finals, having already taken out Stephen Hendry and John Higgins. Stephen Lee eventually defeated Gray in the final, 9–2. However, in the same tournament a year later, Gray again eliminated Higgins and Hendry en route to the final, and this time won the event, defeating newcomer (and another eventual world champion) Mark Selby 9–7.

Although Gray did not qualify for the 2003 World Championship, his success at the 2003 Scottish Open (his only ranking tournament win) saw him break into the top 16 in the 2003/2004 world rankings, where he remained through 2005/2006. In the 2004 World Championship, he advanced to the quarter-finals, losing 13–9 to Graeme Dott. This performance helped him to his highest position of no. 12 in the 2004/2005 world rankings.

On 28 November 2004 he reached his third ranking final in the UK Championship. He lost 10–1 to Stephen Maguire in the final. It was during this tournament that Gray scored his first maximum break – the 50th ever made in professional play – in the fifth frame of his last-32 match against Mark Selby (whom he had defeated in the 2003 Scottish Open final). In his semi-final against Joe Perry, Perry appeared to have won the match 9–7 by potting a colour leaving Gray requiring a snooker, but Perry himself was snookered on the next red, failed to hit it, and did not score another point as Gray cleared the table then hit a 139 total clearance in the deciding frame.

Gray defeated Jimmy White (his long-time practice partner) 10–5 at the 2006 World Championship, but in the second round Peter Ebdon beat Gray 13–2 with a session to spare.

He did not qualify for the 2007 World Championship, losing to 1991 winner John Parrott, and dropped out of the top 32 in the 2007/2008 rankings. In the next season, defeat to Liu Chuang in World Championship qualifying meant that he would be outside the top 40 of the rankings for the following year.

Gray dropped off the circuit after the 2008–09 season but a World Snooker wildcard was awarded to him to allow him to remain on tour for the 2009–10 season.

He was ranked 77th for the 2010/2011 season and on 28 May 2011 Gray failed to qualify for the professional tour for the next season losing in the Q school qualifying stages. He also failed to qualify for the 2012/2013 professional tour.

In May 2013, another poor performance in the Q School qualifying rounds led to further disappointment as he failed to qualify for the 2013/2014 tour. He did however enter himself into the first tournament of the season; the Bulgaria Open and was drawn against Gerard Greene in the last 128, however he withdrew from the tournament before it started and has not played another match since.

== Personal life ==
On 7 October 2009, whilst on holiday in Thailand, Gray was found unconscious and rushed to hospital after blacking out. He was rescued by paramedics after being found collapsed and wearing only his underpants in a grove in the Thai holiday resort of Pattaya. He blacked out after drinking with friends and woke to find himself on a trolley in the Banglamung Hospital.

== Performance and rankings timeline ==
Tournament	1996/ 97	1997/ 98	1998/ 99	1999/ 00	2000/ 01	2001/ 02	2002/ 03	2003/ 04	2004/ 05	2005/ 06	2006/ 07	2007/ 08	2008/ 09	2009/ 10
Ranking (Note: From the 2010/2011 season it shows the ranking at the beginning of the season.)	(Note: New players on the Main Tour don't have a ranking.)	152	61	60	52	30	19	12	14	23	23	35	49	65
Ranking tournaments
Shanghai Masters	Tournament Not Held											LQ	LQ	LQ
Grand Prix (Note: The event also ran under the name LG Cup (2001/2002–2003/2004))	LQ	1R	1R	LQ	LQ	2R	QF	2R	2R	QF	2R	LQ	LQ	LQ
UK Championship	2R	1R	1R	1R	2R	1R	2R	2R	F	1R	2R	LQ	LQ	LQ
Welsh Open	LQ	LQ	LQ	1R	1R	LQ	1R	2R	3R	1R	1R	LQ	LQ	LQ
China Open (Note: The event ran under different name as China International (1997/1998–1998/1999))	NH	NR	LQ	LQ	1R	LQ	Not Held		1R	1R	LQ	LQ	WR	LQ
World Championship	LQ	1R	LQ	2R	LQ	1R	LQ	QF	1R	2R	LQ	LQ	LQ	LQ
Non-ranking tournaments
The Masters	LQ	LQ	WR	LQ	LQ	LQ	LQ	1R	1R	LQ	LQ	LQ	LQ	LQ
Former ranking tournaments
Asian Classic	LQ	Tournament Not Held												
German Open	2R	LQ	NR	Tournament Not Held										
Malta Grand Prix	Non-Ranking Event			1R	NR	Tournament Not Held								
Thailand Masters (Note: The event also ran under the name Thailand Open (1996/1997))	LQ	1R	LQ	LQ	LQ	1R	NR	Not Held			NR	Not Held		
Scottish Open (Note: The event also ran under the names International Open (1996/1997) and Players Championship (2003/2004))	LQ	1R	LQ	LQ	2R	F	W	2R	Tournament Not Held					
British Open	LQ	1R	LQ	LQ	2R	2R	2R	3R	2R	Tournament Not Held				
Irish Masters	Non-Ranking Event						LQ	2R	1R	NH	NR	Not Held		
Malta Cup (Note: The event also ran as the European Open (1996/1997 and 2001/2002–2003/2004) and Irish Open (1998/1999))	LQ	NH	LQ	Not Held		1R	1R	2R	1R	LQ	LQ	NR	Not Held	
Northern Ireland Trophy	Tournament Not Held									NR	1R	2R	1R	NH
Bahrain Championship	Tournament Not Held												LQ	NH
Former non-ranking tournaments
Scottish Masters	A	A	A	A	LQ	LQ	LQ	Tournament Not Held						
Masters Qualifying Event (Note: The event also ran as the Benson & Hedges Championship (1996/1997-2002/2003)	1R	4R	W	2R	QF	1R	2R	NH	A	2R	SF	2R	3R	QF

NH / Not Held	event was not held.
NR / Non-Ranking Event	event is/was no longer a ranking event.
R / Ranking Event	event is/was a ranking event.
MR / Minor-Ranking Event	event is/was a minor-ranking event.

== Career finals ==
=== Ranking finals: 3 (1 title) ===
Legend
UK Championship (0–1)
Other (1–1)

Outcome	No.	Year	Championship	Opponent in the final	Score
Runner-up	1.	2002	Scottish Open	(England) Stephen Lee	2–9
Winner	1.	2003	Scottish Open	(England) Mark Selby	9–7
Runner-up	2.	2004	UK Championship	(Scotland) Stephen Maguire	1–10

=== Non-ranking finals: 2 (2 titles) ===
Outcome	No.	Year	Championship	Opponent in the final	Score
Winner	1.	1996	Merseyside Professional Championship	(England) Paul Sweeny	5–2
Winner	2.	1998	Benson & Hedges Championship	(England) Dave Harold	9–6

=== Amateur finals: 5 (3 titles) ===
Outcome	No.	Year	Championship	Opponent in the final	Score
Runner-up	1.	1994	IBSF World Under-21 Championship	(Australia) Quinten Hann	10–11
Winner	1.	1995	English Amateur Championship	(England) Paul Hunter	8–7
Runner-up	2.	1995	EBSA European Championship	(England) David Lilley	7–8
Winner	2.	2013	Snookerbacker Classic 2013 - Qualifier 6 - Gloucester	(England) Anthony Harris	3–1
Winner	3.	2013	Snookerbacker Classic 2013 - Grand Finals	(England) Kyren Wilson	4–2
