= 2002 Scottish Open (snooker) =

2002 Regal Scottish Open
Tournament information
- Dates: 6–14 April 2002
- Venue: AECC
- City: Aberdeen
- Country: Scotland
- Organisation: WPBSA
- Format: Ranking event
- Total prize fund: £597,200
- Winner's share: £82,500

Final
- Champion: Stephen Lee (ENG)
- Runner-up: David Gray (ENG)
- Score: 9–2

The 2002 Scottish Open (officially the 2002 Regal Scottish Open) was a professional ranking snooker tournament that took place between 6–14 April 2002 at the A.E.C.C in Aberdeen, Scotland. It was the eighth ranking event of the 2001/2002 season.

Stephen Lee claimed his third ranking title by defeating David Gray 9–2 in the final. This was the first all-English final of the Scottish Open and was the first all-English final of this overall competition since 1988, when Steve Davis defeated Jimmy White 12–6 in the International Open. The following year had another all-English final with David Gray defeating Mark Selby 9–7.

== Main draw ==
Last 48; Best of 9 frames
22	(England) John Parrott	5
(England) Wayne Brown	2
28	(Republic of Ireland) Michael Judge	5
53	(England) Gary Ponting	0
25	(Australia) Quinten Hann	5
42	(England) Jimmy Michie	3
27	(England) Joe Perry	5
44	(England) Stuart Bingham	2
29	(Malta) Tony Drago	5
(Iceland) Kristján Helgason	3
24	(Scotland) Chris Small	4
61	(England) Ali Carter	5
19	(England) Anthony Hamilton	5
52	(Scotland) Stephen Maguire	3
30	(England) David Gray	5
95	(England) Mark Selby	3
23	(England) Nigel Bond	5
54	(England) Robert Milkins	0
18	(Scotland) Drew Henry	4
(Belgium) Bjorn Haneveer	5
31	(Wales) Anthony Davies	4
43	(England) Bradley Jones	5
17	(Hong Kong) Marco Fu	3
85	(England) Barry Hawkins	5
20	(Wales) Dominic Dale	5
40	(Pakistan) Shokat Ali	1
21	(England) Steve Davis	5
47	(England) Dave Finbow	3
26	(Scotland) Billy Snaddon	4
37	(England) Gary Wilkinson	5
32	(Thailand) James Wattana	4
33	(England) Brian Morgan	5

Last 32; Best of 9 frames
1	(England) Peter Ebdon	5
22	(England) John Parrott	3
10	(Northern Ireland) Joe Swail	3
28	(Republic of Ireland) Michael Judge	5
5	(Republic of Ireland) Ken Doherty	4
25	(Australia) Quinten Hann	5
14	(Scotland) Graeme Dott	4
27	(England) Joe Perry	5
6	(Scotland) Stephen Hendry	5
29	(Malta) Tony Drago	3
16	(Republic of Ireland) Fergal O'Brien	1
61	(England) Ali Carter	5
13	(England) Mark King	5
19	(England) Anthony Hamilton	1
4	(Scotland) John Higgins	4
30	(England) David Gray	5
7	(Wales) Matthew Stevens	4
23	(England) Nigel Bond	5
12	(Scotland) Alan McManus	4
(Belgium) Bjorn Haneveer	5
15	(England) Dave Harold	5
43	(England) Bradley Jones	2
3	(England) Ronnie O'Sullivan	3
85	(England) Barry Hawkins	5
9	(England) Paul Hunter	3
20	(Wales) Dominic Dale	5
8	(England) Stephen Lee	5
21	(England) Steve Davis	1
11	(England) Jimmy White	5
37	(England) Gary Wilkinson	0
2	(Wales) Mark Williams	5
33	(England) Brian Morgan	3

Last 16; Best of 9 frames
1	(England) Peter Ebdon	5
28	(Republic of Ireland) Michael Judge	1
25	(Australia) Quinten Hann	5
27	(England) Joe Perry	2
6	(Scotland) Stephen Hendry	5
61	(England) Ali Carter	0
13	(England) Mark King	2
30	(England) David Gray	5
23	(England) Nigel Bond	5
(Belgium) Bjorn Haneveer	3
15	(England) Dave Harold	5
85	(England) Barry Hawkins	0
20	(Wales) Dominic Dale	4
8	(England) Stephen Lee	5
11	(England) Jimmy White	5
2	(Wales) Mark Williams	3

Quarter-finals; Best of 9 frames
1	(England) Peter Ebdon	5
25	(Australia) Quinten Hann	4
6	(Scotland) Stephen Hendry	3
30	(England) David Gray	5
23	(England) Nigel Bond	5
15	(England) Dave Harold	1
8	(England) Stephen Lee	5
11	(England) Jimmy White	2

Semi-finals; Best of 11 frames
1	(England) Peter Ebdon	3
30	(England) David Gray	6
23	(England) Nigel Bond	5
8	(England) Stephen Lee	6

Final; Best of 17 frames
30	(England) David Gray	2
8	(England) Stephen Lee	9

== Final ==
Final: Best of 17 frames. A.E.C.C., Aberdeen, Scotland, 14 April 2002.
David Gray (30); England	2–9	Stephen Lee (8); England
Afternoon: 71–24, 26–63, 1–75 (52), 0–123 (107), 18–70 (70), 15–67, 81–57 (81, 50), 43–68; Evening: 14–74, 13–99 (95), 2–82
81	Highest break	107
0	Century breaks	1
1	50+ breaks	5
