= Sean Storey =

English snooker player

Personal information
- Born: 19 August 1971 (age 55) Scunthorpe

Sport
- Country: England
- Sport: Snooker
- Professional: 1991–2007
- Highest ranking: 51 (2003–2005)
- Best ranking finish: Last 16 (2003 World Snooker Championship)

Sean Storey (born 19 August 1971 in Scunthorpe, Lincolnshire, England) is a former English professional snooker player.

His best ranking performance to date came in the World Championship in 2003, where he defeated Joe Perry before bowing out in the last 16, losing 7–13 to John Higgins. Previously he had qualified for the World Championship in 2001, but lost 10–9 to Joe Swail after leading 9–7. His best season was 2002/03 when he won 28 matches overall - the most out of anyone on the tour. He suffered a drop in form in the following season, winning just three matches (although he was now entering tournaments at a later stage). Having been provisionally as high as #26 during the 2003/2004 season, he ended up at #50, and dropped to #68 a year later.

His best ranking break to date was a 145 in the 2001 British Open. In 1997, Storey became the first cueist to compile two maximum breaks in the same pro-am tournament. In the 2004/5 season, he picked up £13,650 in prize money.

Storey is most famous for being the first player to beat Ronnie O'Sullivan in a professional match. On 2 August 1992, Storey ended O'Sullivan's record of 38 consecutive match wins in ranking events. Storey won 5–3 in the sixth round of qualifying in the British Open.

== Performance and rankings timeline ==
Tournament	1991/ 92	1992/ 93	1993/ 94		1994/ 95	1995/ 96	1996/ 97	1997/ 98	1998/ 99	1999/ 00	2000/ 01	2001/ 02	2002/ 03	2003/ 04	2004/ 05	2005/ 06	2006/ 07	2007/ 08
Ranking (Note: It shows the ranking at the beginning of the season)	(Note: New players on the Main Tour don't have a ranking)	147	132		96	117	129	82	72	87	99	89	82	51	51	68	64	(Note: He was an amateur)
Ranking tournaments
Grand Prix (Note: The event was called the LG Cup (2001/2002–2003/2004))	LQ	LQ	LQ		LQ	LQ	2R	LQ	LQ	LQ	LQ	LQ	LQ	LQ	1R	1R	LQ	A
Northern Ireland Trophy	Tournament Not Held															NR	LQ	A
UK Championship	LQ	LQ	LQ		LQ	LQ	LQ	2R	LQ	LQ	LQ	LQ	LQ	LQ	1R	LQ	LQ	A
Welsh Open	LQ	LQ	1R		LQ	LQ	LQ	2R	LQ	LQ	LQ	LQ	LQ	LQ	LQ	LQ	LQ	A
China Open (Note: The event was called the China International (1997/1998–1998/1999))	Tournament Not Held							NR	LQ	LQ	LQ	LQ	Not Held		LQ	LQ	LQ	A
World Championship	LQ	LQ	LQ		LQ	LQ	LQ	LQ	LQ	LQ	1R	LQ	2R	LQ	LQ	LQ	LQ	LQ
Non-ranking tournaments
The Masters	LQ	LQ	LQ		LQ	A	LQ	LQ	LQ	LQ	LQ	LQ	LQ	LQ	A	LQ	LQ	A
Former ranking tournaments
Classic	LQ	Tournament Not Held																
Strachan Open (Note: The event was called the Strachan Open (1991/1992) and the Strachan Challenge (1992/1993–1993/1994))	LQ	MR	NR		Tournament Not Held													
Asian Classic (Note: The event was called the Dubai Classic (1991/1992-1994/1995) and the Thailand Classic (1995/1996))	LQ	1R	LQ		LQ	LQ	LQ	Tournament Not Held										
German Open	Tournament Not Held					LQ	LQ	LQ	NR	Tournament Not Held								
Malta Grand Prix	Not Held				Non-Ranking Event					LQ	NR	Tournament Not Held						
Thailand Masters (Note: The event was called the Asian Open (1991/1992-1992/1993) and the Thailand Open (1993/1994-1996/1997))	1R	1R	LQ		LQ	LQ	LQ	LQ	LQ	LQ	LQ	LQ	NR	Not Held			NR	NH
Players Championship (Note: The event was called the International Open (1992/1993–1996/1997))	NH	LQ	LQ		LQ	LQ	LQ	1R	LQ	1R	LQ	LQ	2R	LQ	Tournament Not Held			
British Open	LQ	LQ	LQ		LQ	LQ	1R	LQ	LQ	LQ	LQ	1R	1R	LQ	LQ	Not Held		
Irish Masters	Non-Ranking Event												LQ	LQ	LQ	NH	NR	NH
Malta Cup (Note: The event was called the European Open (1991/1992-1996/1997 and 2001/2002-2003/2004) and the Irish Open (1998/1999))	LQ	LQ	LQ		LQ	LQ	LQ	NH	LQ	Not Held		LQ	LQ	LQ	LQ	LQ	LQ	NR
Former non-ranking tournaments
Strachan Challenge	R	MR	LQ	LQ	Tournament Not Held													
Merseyside Professional Championship	Not Held		A		QF	2R	A	2R	1R	3R	A	A	A	A	A	Not Held		

Performance Table Legend
LQ	lost in the qualifying draw	#R	lost in the early rounds of the tournament (WR = Wildcard round, RR = Round robin)	QF	lost in the quarter-finals
SF	lost in the semi-finals	F	lost in the final	W	won the tournament
DNQ	did not qualify for the tournament	A	did not participate in the tournament	WD	withdrew from the tournament

NH / Not Held	means an event was not held.
NR / Non-Ranking Event	means an event is/was no longer a ranking event.
R / Ranking Event	means an event is/was a ranking event.
MR / Minor-Ranking Event	means an event is/was a minor-ranking event.
