= Anthony Davies =

Welsh snooker player

Personal information
- Born: 2 December 1969 (age 56) Cardiff, Wales

Sport
- Country: Wales
- Sport: Snooker
- Professional: 1991–2005
- Highest ranking: 26 (2002–03)
- Best ranking finish: Quarter-final (1996 European Open)

Anthony Davies (born 2 December 1969) is a Welsh former professional snooker player, who competed on the professional circuit from 1991 to 2005.

Davies started playing snooker aged 12. He made his first maximum break aged 18.

His best performance was at the 1996 European Open, where he reached the quarter-finals after eliminating James Wattana and Joe Johnson. In 2002, he also reached the last 16 of the World Championship. Davies remained in the top 32 in the world rankings for three seasons, peaking at number 26, until a disappointing 2003/2004 season. He was relegated from the main tour in 2005.

Since 1998, he has been an official coach for World Snooker. He has established two junior clubs in the South Wales area, helping to increase participation levels and improve playing performance amongst local snooker players. In April 2008, he worked on a pilot scheme, called Kids Into Snooker (KIS), set up by Cuefactor in conjunction with the Paul Hunter Foundation, the aim being to help generate interest in snooker amongst disadvantaged young people.

== Performance and rankings timeline ==
Tournament	1991/ 92	1992/ 93	1993/ 94		1994/ 95	1995/ 96	1996/ 97	1997/ 98	1998/ 99	1999/ 00	2000/ 01	2001/ 02	2002/ 03	2003/ 04	2004/ 05	2013/ 14	2014/ 15
Ranking (Note: It shows the ranking at the beginning of the season)	(Note: New players on the Main Tour do not have a ranking)	94	90		64	45	37	61	85	80	40	31	26	31	54	(Note: He was an amateur)	
Ranking tournaments
UK Championship	2R	LQ	LQ		LQ	LQ	LQ	LQ	LQ	1R	LQ	1R	2R	1R	LQ	A	A
German Masters (Note: The event was called the German Open (1995/1996-1997/1998))	Tournament Not Held					LQ	LQ	LQ	NR	Tournament Not Held						A	A
Welsh Open	LQ	LQ	LQ		LQ	1R	LQ	LQ	LQ	1R	1R	1R	LQ	1R	LQ	A	A
Players Tour Championship Grand Final	Tournament Not Held															DNQ	DNQ
China Open (Note: The event was called the China International (1997/1998-1998/1999))	Tournament Not Held							NR	1R	1R	LQ	1R	Not Held		LQ	A	A
World Championship	LQ	LQ	1R		1R	LQ	LQ	LQ	LQ	LQ	LQ	2R	LQ	LQ	LQ	A	A
Non-ranking tournaments
The Masters	LQ	LQ	LQ		LQ	LQ	LQ	LQ	LQ	LQ	LQ	LQ	LQ	LQ	A	A	A
World Seniors Championship	A	Tournament Not Held														A	LQ
World Grand Prix	Tournament Not Held																DNQ
Former ranking tournaments
Classic	LQ	Tournament Not Held															
Strachan Open (Note: The event was called the Strachan Open (1991/1992) and the Strachan Challenge (1992/1993-1993/1994))	LQ	MR	NR		Tournament Not Held												
Asian Classic (Note: The event was called the Dubai Classic (1991/1992-1994/1995) and the Thailand Classic (1995/1996))	LQ	LQ	LQ		LQ	1R	LQ	Tournament Not Held									
Malta Grand Prix	Tournament Not Held				Non-Ranking Event					LQ	NR	Tournament Not Held					
Thailand Masters (Note: The event was called the Asian Open (1991/1992-1992/1993) and the Thailand Open (1993/1994-1996/1997))	LQ	1R	LQ		WR	LQ	LQ	LQ	LQ	2R	1R	1R	NR	Tournament Not Held			
Players Championship (Note: The event was called the International Open (1992/1993-1996/1997) and the Scottish Open (1997/1998-2002/2003))	NH	LQ	2R		LQ	LQ	LQ	LQ	LQ	1R	LQ	1R	2R	1R	Tournament Not Held		
British Open	LQ	LQ	LQ		1R	1R	LQ	1R	2R	1R	2R	3R	1R	1R	LQ	Not Held	
Malta Cup (Note: The event was called the European Open (1991/1992-1996/1997 and 2001/2002-2003/2004) and the Irish Open (1998/1999))	LQ	1R	LQ		1R	QF	LQ	NH	LQ	Not Held		1R	LQ	LQ	LQ	Not Held	
Irish Masters	Non-Ranking Event												LQ	LQ	LQ	Not Held	
World Open (Note: The event was called the Grand Prix (1991/1992–2000/2001, 2004/2005) and the LG Cup (2001/2002–2003/2004))	LQ	1R	2R		LQ	1R	LQ	1R	LQ	LQ	LQ	1R	2R	1R	1R	A	NH
Former non-ranking tournaments
Strachan Challenge	R	MR	LQ	LQ	Tournament Not Held												
Scottish Masters	A	A	A		A	A	A	A	A	A	A	A	LQ	Tournament Not Held			
Merseyside Professional Championship	A	A	A		A	A	A	A	A	A	A	A	QF	QF	A	Not Held	

Performance table legend
LQ	lost in the qualifying draw	#R	lost in the early rounds of the tournament (WR = Wildcard round, RR = Round robin)	QF	lost in the quarter-finals
SF	lost in the semi–finals	F	lost in the final	W	won the tournament
DNQ	did not qualify for the tournament	A	did not participate in the tournament	WD	withdrew from the tournament

NH / Not Held	means an event was not held.
NR / Non-Ranking Event	means an event is/was no longer a ranking event.
R / Ranking Event	means an event is/was a ranking event.
MR / Minor-Ranking Event	means an event is/was a minor-ranking event.

== Career finals ==
=== Non-ranking finals: 1 ===
Outcome	No.	Year	Championship	Opponent in the final	Score
Runner-up	1.	1998	UK Tour - Event 1	(England) Alfie Burden	5–6

=== Amateur finals: 1 ===
Outcome	No.	Year	Championship	Opponent in the final	Score
Runner-up	1.	2007	Welsh Amateur Championship	(Wales) Philip Williams	3–8
