= 2004 European Open (snooker) =

Tournament information
- Dates: 1–6 March 2004
- Venue: Hilton Conference Centre
- City: Portomaso
- Country: Malta
- Organisation: WPBSA
- Format: Ranking event
- Total prize fund: £400,000
- Winner's share: £48,000
- Highest break: Stephen Maguire (SCO) (137)

Final
- Champion: Stephen Maguire (SCO)
- Runner-up: Jimmy White (ENG)
- Score: 9–3

The 2004 European Open was the 2004 edition of the European Open snooker tournament, held from 1 to 6 March 2004, at the Hilton Conference Centre, Portomaso, Malta. It was the final year the event was known as European Open, as the event was renamed to Malta Cup in next year. Stephen Maguire defeated Jimmy White by nine frames to three (9–3) in the final to claim his first ranking-event title, transforming him from "talented underachiever into a world-ranking event winner", according to The Times. In the semi-finals Maguire defeated Stephen Lee and White beat Tony Drago. The tournament was the fifth of eight WPBSA ranking events in the 2003/2004 season, following the Welsh Open and preceding the Irish Masters.

== Tournament summary ==
Prior to the 1988/1989 season no ranking tournament had been continuously staged outside of the United Kingdom (although the World Championship had been held twice in Australia). The snooker governing body, the World Professional Billiards and Snooker Association (WPBSA), decided to include overseas events and the first two locations chosen were Canada and Europe. The European Open was first held in 1989 in Deauville, France, and was suspended for 1997/1998 and 2000/2001. It moved to the Hilton Conference Centre, Portomaso, Malta for the first time in 2004 and was renamed the Malta Cup the following season.

The 2004 tournament was the fifth of eight WPBSA ranking events in the 2003/2004 season, following the Welsh Open and preceding the Irish Masters. Held in January, the Welsh Open was won by Ronnie O'Sullivan, who defeated Steve Davis by nine frames to eight (9–8) in the final. The defending European Open champion was also O'Sullivan, who defeated Stephen Hendry 9–6 in last year's final. Paul Hunter, who had defeated O'Sullivan in the final of the non-ranking Masters in February, entered the tournament "playing the best snooker of his career", according to Phil Yates of The Times.

=== Qualifying ===
The qualifying stage was played between players ranked 17 and those ranked lower for one of 16 places in the final stage. The matches were best-of-9 frames until the semi-finals. In March 2004 Maltese player Tony Drago defeated Adrian Gunnell 5–2 in a match held over from the qualifying stage in November.

=== Round 1 ===
The qualifiers went through to face members of the top 16. In this round, Davis came from 2–4 down to beat Joe Swail 5–4, in a match where both players missed chances. In the deciding frame, Davis won on the pink ball after Swail had missed the brown. After the match, Davis said it was a historic day as he had never won a match in the country. Stephen Lee received a walkover to the next round after his opponent Robin Hull withdrew for medical reasons. World number 41 Stephen Maguire made a break of 89 in the final frame of his match against Peter Ebdon to win 5–4, and world number three O'Sullivan opened his match against Marco Fu with a century break of 110 and went on to win 5–1. Chris Small, who suffers from the spinal condition ankylosing spondylitis, whitewashed UK champion Matthew Stevens 5–0, in a match lasting almost three hours and which saw Stevens lose two frames on the black ball. Neil Robertson defeated Ken Doherty 5–3, and Joe Perry beat David Roe by the same scoreline. In the last match of the day, David Gray beat Fergal O'Brien 5–3.

World number one Mark Williams was defeated 1–5 by Anthony Hamilton, who made a break of 133. Williams refused to answer questions at the post-match press conference, explaining: "I'm not saying anything because if I do I could be in trouble so I'm keeping my mouth shut." Hunter and Hendry made high breaks of 49 and 55 in defeating Brian Morgan and Jimmy Michie 5–1, respectively. After the match Hendry—the world number two and a seven-time world champion said "I feel like going to apologise to each fan one by one because it was such a bad match". John Higgins whitewashed Barry Pinches 5–0, compiling a 132 break in the last frame in a match where Pinches made a high break of 33. Jimmy White overcame James Wattana 5–4 having trailed 2–3. Graeme Dott defeated Drew Henry 5-3 and Quinten Hann beat Simon Bedford 5–0. In the last game of the day, Drago beat Alan McManus 5–4.

=== Round 2 ===
In round two O'Sullivan defeated Small 5–1, coming from behind to win in each of the first three frames with breaks of 58, 81, and 46. A break of 112 completed the victory, after which O'Sullivan said his opponent had made him work. In the fifth frame O'Sullivan continued playing despite needing snookers, later explaining, "I wanted to keep playing because I was enjoying it so much". White made breaks of 72, 52, 69, 51, and 65 in defeating Hendry 5–3, after which Hendry said his performance was "horrendous", and White said his refusal to go out the night before contributed to his performance. In the sixth frame White led by 41 points before missing an easy red, allowing Hendry to win on the black with a 55 break to level at 3–3. White dominated the next two frames for the victory. Higgins, without a tournament victory for over two years, whitewashed Dott 5–0 with breaks of 82, 81, 57, and 52, and said it was the "best [he had] felt for ages". Drago defeated Hunter 5–2 to reach the quarter-finals of a ranking events for the first time since 1998, in a low-quality match where Drago made one break over 50. Lee defeated Davis 5–3 in a four-hour match, and Higgins completed a second whitewash when he beat Dott 5–0, bringing his career record against Dott to 9–1. Maguire defeated Perry 5–4 to reach his first ranking quarter-final, and Hann beat Hamilton 5–1 to claim the final place in the next round.

=== Quarter-finals ===
In the quarter-finals Lee defeated O'Sullivan 5–4 in a match that lasted 3 hours and 32 minutes. O'Sullivan came from 2–3 down to lead 4–3 before Lee leveled the match. In the final frame O'Sullivan led 36–0, before Lee made a 46 break and fluked a snooker that enabled him to claim victory. O'Sullivan said his performance was very poor, while Lee said he was quietly confident. White defeated Robertson 5–3 to reach his third semi-final of the season. White led 4–1 and was 56 points ahead in the sixth but missed a straightforward green, allowing Robertson to win on the black with a 67 break. Robertson took the next frame before a risky long pot in the eighth allowed White to win the match. White—who last won a ranking title 12 years ago prior at this event—said, "Everyone knows I've been in front so many times in the past and tossed it away so I was having nightmares out there". Drago quickly won the first four frames of his match against Hann, conceding the fifth, before completing a 5–1 victory, after which he said the crowd support helped him. Maguire caused an upset when he beat Higgins 5–3, a match that saw Maguire lose the first two frames before winning the next four. After the match Maguire he said he had "starting to think about winning it now".

=== Semi-finals ===
The semi-finals were best-of-11 frames. White reached his first final in four years when he defeated Drago 6–4. Leading 4–1 White made a break of 104 to win the sixth frame, before missing a straightforward red to allow his opponent to win the seventh with an 84 break. Drago won the next two in 15 minutes with breaks of 44 and 109—completing the latter in four minutes—before an 86 break gave White the victory, after which White said, "Playing Tony here, I got a taste of what players have against me at the Masters when the crowd are all on my side but they were fair and I enjoyed every minute of it."

In the other semi-final Maguire beat Lee 6–4 in an error-strewn match which lasted four hours. After winning the first two frames Maguire lost the next three, but "kept his cool" to seal the victory. Maguire said the match was a "battle" and that he was surprised at how badly his opponents had played in the tournament, while Lee said he "just blew up" and that, "When you’re as poor as that you get into such a state of mind that you can’t think straight".

=== Final ===
The match was White's 23rd appearance in a final and his first since the 2000 British Open. In the best-of-17 final Maguire defeated White 9–3 to win his first ranking title at the age of 22, earning £48,000 in prize money. The victory, according to The Times, transformed Maguire from "talented underachiever into a world-ranking event winner"; according to BBC Sport his victory was a surprise.

In the afternoon session Maguire made two sizeable breaks and one of 137 to lead 3–0. He won the next frame and compiled a century in the fifth. The sixth frame was awarded to Maguire, when White violated the three-miss rule. Snookered in the jaws of a corner pocket, White twice attempted to hit the pack of five reds off a side cushion and missed. On his third attempt he adopted a slow roll to the pack and again missed. In the evening session, trailing 0–6, White won his first frame before the next four were shared, the last of which included a break of 125 by White. At 8–2 a break of 57 gave Maguire the victory.

After his victory Maguire acknowledged the influence of Terry Griffiths who had been working with him on the mental side of the game: "He's been on the phone just telling me to keep calm and that I can do it if I believe in myself". Maguire said he always knew he was good enough to win a tournament and that he would aim for a top-16 finish for the season. White said, "Stephen outplayed me in safety, potting and position so he deserved to win" and, "He gave me a good bashing. I'm pleased for him because he's a nice lad but I'm disappointed because I didn't compete".

== Prize fund ==
The breakdown of prize money for this year is shown below:

- Winner: £48,000
- Final: £24,000
- Semi-final: £12,000
- Quarter-final: £7,900
- Last 16: £6,900
- Last 32: £5,500
- Last 48: £2,900
- Last 64: £2,100
- Last 80: £1,600
- Last 96: £1,050
- Stage one highest break: £1,800
- Stage two highest break: £5,000
- Stage one maximum break: £5,000
- Stage two maximum break: £20,000
- Total: £400,000

== Main draw ==
Numbers to the left of the players' names are the tournament seedings. Players in bold denote match winners.

Last 32; Best of 9 frames
1	**Ronnie O'Sullivan** (ENG)	**5**
19	Marco Fu (HKG)	1
9	Matthew Stevens (WAL)	0
18	**Chris Small** (SCO)	**5**
11	**Steve Davis** (ENG)	**5**
27	Joe Swail (NIR)	4
5	**Stephen Lee** (ENG)	**w/o**
32	Robin Hull (FIN)	w/d
7	Peter Ebdon (ENG)	4
41	**Stephen Maguire** (SCO)	**5**
16	**Joe Perry** (ENG)	**5**
57	David Roe (ENG)	3
13	**Graeme Dott** (SCO)	**5**
25	Drew Henry (SCO)	3
4	**John Higgins** (SCO)	**5**
36	Barry Pinches (ENG)	0
3	**Stephen Hendry** (SCO)	**5**
60	Jimmy Michie (ENG)	1
15	**Jimmy White** (ENG)	**5**
34	James Wattana (THA)	4
12	**David Gray** (ENG)	**5**
33	Fergal O'Brien (IRL)	3
6	Ken Doherty (IRL)	3
**Neil Robertson** (AUS)	**5**
8	**Paul Hunter** (ENG)	**5**
45	Brian Morgan (ENG)	1
10	Alan McManus (SCO)	4
24	**Tony Drago** (MLT)	**5**
14	**Quinten Hann** (AUS)	**5**
Simon Bedford (ENG)	0
2	Mark Williams (WAL)	1
20	**Anthony Hamilton** (ENG)	**5**

Last 16; Best of 9 frames
1	**Ronnie O'Sullivan** (ENG)	**5**
18	Chris Small (SCO)	1
11	Steve Davis (ENG)	3
5	**Stephen Lee** (ENG)	**5**
41	**Stephen Maguire** (SCO)	**5**
16	Joe Perry (ENG)	4
13	Graeme Dott (SCO)	0
4	**John Higgins** (SCO)	**5**
3	Stephen Hendry (SCO)	3
15	**Jimmy White** (ENG)	**5**
12	David Gray (ENG)	2
**Neil Robertson** (AUS)	**5**
8	Paul Hunter (ENG)	2
24	**Tony Drago** (MLT)	**5**
14	**Quinten Hann** (AUS)	**5**
20	Anthony Hamilton (ENG)	1

Quarter-finals; Best of 9 frames
1	Ronnie O'Sullivan (ENG)	4
5	**Stephen Lee** (ENG)	**5**
41	**Stephen Maguire** (SCO)	**5**
4	John Higgins (SCO)	3
15	**Jimmy White** (ENG)	**5**
Neil Robertson (AUS)	3
24	**Tony Drago** (MLT)	**5**
14	Quinten Hann (AUS)	1

Semi-finals; Best of 11 frames
5	Stephen Lee (ENG)	4
41	**Stephen Maguire** (SCO)	**6**
15	**Jimmy White** (ENG)	**6**
24	Tony Drago (MLT)	4

Final; Best of 17 frames
41	**Stephen Maguire** (SCO)	**9**
15	Jimmy White (ENG)	3

Key

w/o = walkover
w/d = withdrew

== Final ==
Scores in bold denote winning frame scores and the winning participant.

Final: Best of 17 frames. Referee: Jan Verhaas. Hilton Conference Centre, Portomaso, Malta, 6 March 2004.
**Stephen Maguire** (41); Scotland	**9**–3	Jimmy White (15); England
Afternoon: **121**–2 (96), **79**–44 (72), **137**–0 (137), **81**–23, **113**–8 (103), **58**–6 (Note: Maguire was awarded the frame when White violated the three-miss rule.), 63–**67**, **62**–60 (62); Evening: 18–**91** (78), **77**–1, 0–**125** (125), **86**–6 (57)
**137**	Highest break	125
**2**	Century breaks	1
**6**	50+ breaks	2

== Qualifying ==
Qualifying for the tournament took place at Pontin's in Prestatyn, Wales between 31 October and 5 November 2003.

=== Round 1 ===
Best of 9 frames

(England) Andrew Norman	4–**5**	(Scotland) **Steven Bennie**
(England) Andrew Higginson	2–**5**	(Wales) **Ian Preece**
(Scotland) Billy Snaddon	4–**5**	(England) **Martin Gould**
(England) Paul Wykes	3–**5**	(England) **Paul Sweeny**
(England) **Rory McLeod**	**5**–2	(England) Carlo Giagnacovo
(England) Peter Lines	2–**5**	(England) **Tom Ford**
(Wales) Paul Davies	3–**5**	(England) **Adrian Rosa**
(Republic of Ireland) **Colm Gilcreest**	**5**–4	(Norway) Kurt Maflin
(England) **Munraj Pal**	**5**–4	(England) Chris Melling
(Wales) **Ryan Day**	**5**–3	(China) Liu Song
(England) Matthew Couch	1–**5**	(England) **Michael Rhodes**
(England) **Craig Butler**	**5**–1	(Thailand) Supoj Saenla
(Scotland) **Martin Dziewialtowski**	**5**–1	(England) Michael Wild
(Thailand) **Atthasit Mahitthi**	**5**–3	(England) Andy Neck
(Republic of Ireland) **Leo Fernandez**	**5**–4	(Wales) Ian Sargeant
(Thailand) **Kwan Poomjang**	**5**–4	(Cyprus) Mehmet Husnu

(England) **Ricky Walden**	**5**–1	(England) James Leadbetter
(Wales) **Lee Walker**	**5**–2	(Canada) Alain Robidoux
(England) Luke Fisher	2–**5**	(Scotland) **Scott MacKenzie**
(Northern Ireland) **Jason Prince**	**5**–4	(China) Ding Junhui
(England) Joe Johnson	w/d–**w/o**	(Republic of Ireland) **Garry Hardiman**
(Northern Ireland) **Terry Murphy**	**5**–1	(Scotland) Gary Thomson
(England) Wayne Brown	1–**5**	(Australia) **Neil Robertson**
(Iceland) Kristján Helgason	w/d–**w/o**	(England) **Luke Simmonds**
(England) Tony Jones	2–**5**	(England) **Darryn Walker**
(England) David Gilbert	3–**5**	(Wales) **Philip Williams**
(England) **Adrian Gunnell**	**5**–1	(Republic of Ireland) Joe Delaney
(England) **Jason Ferguson**	**5**–2	(England) Stuart Mann
(England) **Simon Bedford**	**5**–3	(England) Stephen Croft
(England) **Jamie Cope**	**5**–4	(England) Ian Brumby
(Australia) Johl Younger	2–**5**	(Australia) **Steve Mifsud**
(England) Bradley Jones	1–**5**	(Northern Ireland) **Joe Meara**

=== Round 2–5 ===
Round 2 Best of 9 frames
(Scotland) Steven Bennie	3
(Wales) **Ian Preece**	**5**
(England) **Martin Gould**	**5**
(England) Paul Sweeny	4
(England) **Rory McLeod**	**5**
(England) Tom Ford	3
(England) Adrian Rosa	2
(Republic of Ireland) **Colm Gilcreest**	**5**
(England) **Munraj Pal**	**5**
(Wales) Ryan Day	4
(England) Michael Rhodes	4
(England) **Craig Butler**	**5**
(Scotland) **Martin Dziewialtowski**	**5**
(Thailand) Atthasit Mahitthi	2
(Republic of Ireland) Leo Fernandez	4
(Thailand) **Kwan Poomjang**	**5**
(England) Ricky Walden	0
(Wales) **Lee Walker**	**5**
(Scotland) **Scott MacKenzie**	**5**
(Northern Ireland) Jason Prince	2
(Republic of Ireland) **Garry Hardiman**	**5**
(Northern Ireland) Terry Murphy	4
(Australia) **Neil Robertson**	**5**
(England) Luke Simmonds	0
(England) Darryn Walker	1
(Wales) **Philip Williams**	**5**
(England) **Adrian Gunnell**	**5**
(England) Jason Ferguson	1
(England) **Simon Bedford**	**5**
(England) Jamie Cope	3
(Australia) Steve Mifsud	4
(Northern Ireland) **Joe Meara**	**5**

Round 3 Best of 9 frames
(England) Shaun Murphy	4
(Wales) **Ian Preece**	**5**
(England) Dave Finbow	3
(England) **Martin Gould**	**5**
(England) Alfie Burden	0
(England) **Rory McLeod**	**5**
(England) Andy Hicks	3
(Republic of Ireland) **Colm Gilcreest**	**5**
(Northern Ireland) **Patrick Wallace**	**5**
(England) Munraj Pal	4
(England) **David Roe**	**5**
(England) Craig Butler	0
(England) **Sean Storey**	**5**
(Scotland) Martin Dziewialtowski	3
(Pakistan) **Shokat Ali**	**5**
(Thailand) Kwan Poomjang	2
(England) **Jimmy Michie**	**5**
(Wales) Lee Walker	1
(Scotland) Marcus Campbell	4
(Scotland) **Scott MacKenzie**	**5**
(England) **Mike Dunn**	**5**
(Republic of Ireland) Garry Hardiman	1
(Wales) Darren Morgan	2
(Australia) **Neil Robertson**	**5**
(Belgium) **Bjorn Haneveer**	**5**
(Wales) Philip Williams	3
(England) Nick Walker	0
(England) **Adrian Gunnell**	**5**
(England) Nick Dyson	4
(England) **Simon Bedford**	**5**
(England) **Rod Lawler**	**5**
(Northern Ireland) Joe Meara	1

Round 4 Best of 9 frames
(England) **Jonathan Birch**	**5**
(Wales) Ian Preece	3
(Republic of Ireland) **Michael Judge**	**5**
(England) Martin Gould	2
(England) **Barry Hawkins**	**5**
(England) Rory McLeod	2
(England) **Stuart Bingham**	**5**
(Republic of Ireland) Colm Gilcreest	2
(Scotland) **Stephen Maguire**	**5**
(Northern Ireland) Patrick Wallace	2
(England) Gary Wilkinson	2
(England) **David Roe**	**5**
(Scotland) Jamie Burnett	3
(England) **Sean Storey**	**5**
(England) **Barry Pinches**	**5**
(Pakistan) Shokat Ali	2
(England) Nigel Bond	4
(England) **Jimmy Michie**	**5**
(Thailand) **James Wattana**	**5**
(Scotland) Scott MacKenzie	3
(Republic of Ireland) **Fergal O'Brien**	**5**
(England) Mike Dunn	3
(England) Mark Davis	1
(Australia) **Neil Robertson**	**5**
(England) **Brian Morgan**	**5**
(Belgium) Bjorn Haneveer	4
(Northern Ireland) Gerard Greene	4
(England) **Adrian Gunnell**	**5**
(England) Stuart Pettman	2
(England) **Simon Bedford**	**5**
(England) **Michael Holt**	**5**
(England) Rod Lawler	3

Round 5 Best of 9 frames
(Hong Kong) **Marco Fu**	**5**
(England) Jonathan Birch	0
(Scotland) **Chris Small**	**5**
(Republic of Ireland) Michael Judge	2
(Northern Ireland) **Joe Swail**	**5**
(England) Barry Hawkins	3
(Finland) **Robin Hull**	**5**
(England) Stuart Bingham	1
(Wales) Dominic Dale	0
(Scotland) **Stephen Maguire**	**5**
(England) Mark King	4
(England) **David Roe**	**5**
(Scotland) **Drew Henry**	**5**
(England) Sean Storey	1
(England) Robert Milkins	1
(England) **Barry Pinches**	**5**
(Wales) Anthony Davies	4
(England) **Jimmy Michie**	**5**
(England) Ali Carter	4
(Thailand) **James Wattana**	**5**
(England) John Parrott	4
(Republic of Ireland) **Fergal O'Brien**	**5**
(England) Ian McCulloch	1
(Australia) **Neil Robertson**	**5**
(England) Mark Selby	1
(England) **Brian Morgan**	**5**
(Malta) **Tony Drago** (Note: Match was held over to the venue in Malta.)	**5**
(England) Adrian Gunnell	2
(England) Dave Harold	4
(England) **Simon Bedford**	**5**
(England) **Anthony Hamilton**	**5**
(England) Michael Holt	2

== Century breaks ==
=== Qualifying stage centuries ===
- 144 – Michael Judge
- 140 – Lee Walker
- 139, 102 – Barry Pinches
- 135 – Martin Dziewialtowski
- 135 – Ali Carter
- 131 – Mike Dunn
- 129 – Leo Fernandez
- 128 – Kwan Poomjang
- 128 – Ian Brumby
- 124, 100 – Anthony Hamilton
- 121 – Rory McLeod
- 121 – Joe Swail
- 120 – Brian Morgan
- 120 – David Roe
- 119 – Philip Williams
- 117 – Kurt Maflin
- 116 – Stuart Bingham
- 115 – Chris Small
- 114 – Adrian Gunnell
- 111 – Dave Harold
- 108, 101 – Robin Hull
- 107 – Liu Song
- 106 – Tom Ford
- 106 – Stephen Maguire
- 106 – John Parrott
- 106 – Patrick Wallace
- 105 – Jamie Cope
- 104 – Jimmy Michie
- 102 – Ding Junhui

=== Televised stage centuries ===
- 137, 103 – Stephen Maguire
- 133 – Anthony Hamilton
- 132 – John Higgins
- 125, 104, 103 – Jimmy White
- 112, 110 – Ronnie O'Sullivan
- 109, 100 – Neil Robertson
- 109 – Tony Drago
- 100 – Peter Ebdon

== Sources ==
- European Open 2004. snooker.org.
- Embassy World Rankings 2003/2004. snooker.org.
