= 2004 Masters (snooker) =

Professional non-ranking snooker tournament, Feb 2004

Tournament information
- Dates: 1–8 February 2004
- Venue: Wembley Conference Centre
- City: London
- Country: England
- Organisation: World Professional Billiards and Snooker Association
- Format: Non-ranking event
- Total prize fund: £400,000
- Winner's share: £100,000
- Highest break: Ronnie O'Sullivan (ENG) (138)

Final
- Champion: Paul Hunter (ENG)
- Runner-up: Ronnie O'Sullivan (ENG)
- Score: 10–9

The 2004 Masters was a professional non-ranking snooker tournament held in February 2004. It was the 30th staging of the Masters tournament, one of three Triple Crown events on the Snooker Tour, the eighth of fifteen World Professional Billiards and Snooker Association (WPBSA) events in the 2003/2004 season, and was held at the Wembley Conference Centre in London, United Kingdom from 1 to 8 February 2004. The tournament was broadcast in the United Kingdom by the BBC.

Paul Hunter won the tournament, defeating 1995 winner and world number three Ronnie O'Sullivan 10–9, claiming the third Masters title of his career in four years. Hunter joined Cliff Thorburn, Stephen Hendry and Steve Davis as the fourth player to win the Masters three or more times. In the semi-finals, Hunter defeated John Higgins 6–3 and O'Sullivan beat Jimmy White 6–4. O'Sullivan compiled a 138 break, the highest of the tournament, in the second frame of his semi-final match against White.

== Tournament summary ==
=== Background ===
The Masters was first held in 1975 at the West Centre Hotel with the sport's top ten ranking players invited to participate. It moved to the New London Theatre the following year, before it resided at the Wembley Conference Centre in 1979 where all editions of the tournament had been held going into the 2004 tournament. It is part of snooker's Triple Crown events alongside the World Snooker Championship and the UK Championship, but does not have official ranking status. The tournament was sponsored by Benson & Hedges until 2003 when the company was required to end its association with the Masters due to restrictions on tobacco advertising in the United Kingdom. Thus, the tournament went without sponsorship in 2004.

The 2004 tournament was the eighth of fifteen World Professional Billiards and Snooker Association (WPBSA) events in the 2003/2004 season, following the Welsh Open and preceding the third Challenge Tour event. Held in January, the Welsh Open was won by Ronnie O'Sullivan, who defeated Steve Davis by nine frames to eight (9–8) in the final. The defending Masters champion was Mark Williams, who defeated Stephen Hendry 10–4 in the previous year's final. The tournament had a prize fund of £400,000, and was broadcast on television by the BBC. For the 2004 tournament, a new trophy commissioned by the WPBSA and designed by crystal manufacturer Waterford Crystal was awarded to the Masters champion for the first time.

=== Format and wild-card matches ===
Mark Williams, the defending Masters champion and 2003 World Snooker Champion, was the number 1 seed. Places were allocated to the top 16 players in the world rankings. Players seeded 15 and 16 played in the wild-card round against Neil Robertson (the winner of the qualifying event in the Welsh town of Prestatyn during December 2003), and Ding Junhui, who was the wild-card selection. All matches were played to the best of 11 frames, up until the final which was played to a maximum of 19 frames.

For the wild-card round, Robertson was drawn against world number 15 Jimmy White, the 1984 Masters champion. White won the match 6–2 by compiling six half-centuries and a match-best break of 83. World number 16 Joe Perry was assigned as Ding's opponent, the youngest player in the history of the Masters at age 16. Ding compiled breaks of 58 and 108, and Perry took frame four before the mid-session interval. A further break of 118 in the sixth frame, along with Perry potting the cue ball, enabled Ding to claim the final two frames and win the match 6–3.

=== First round ===
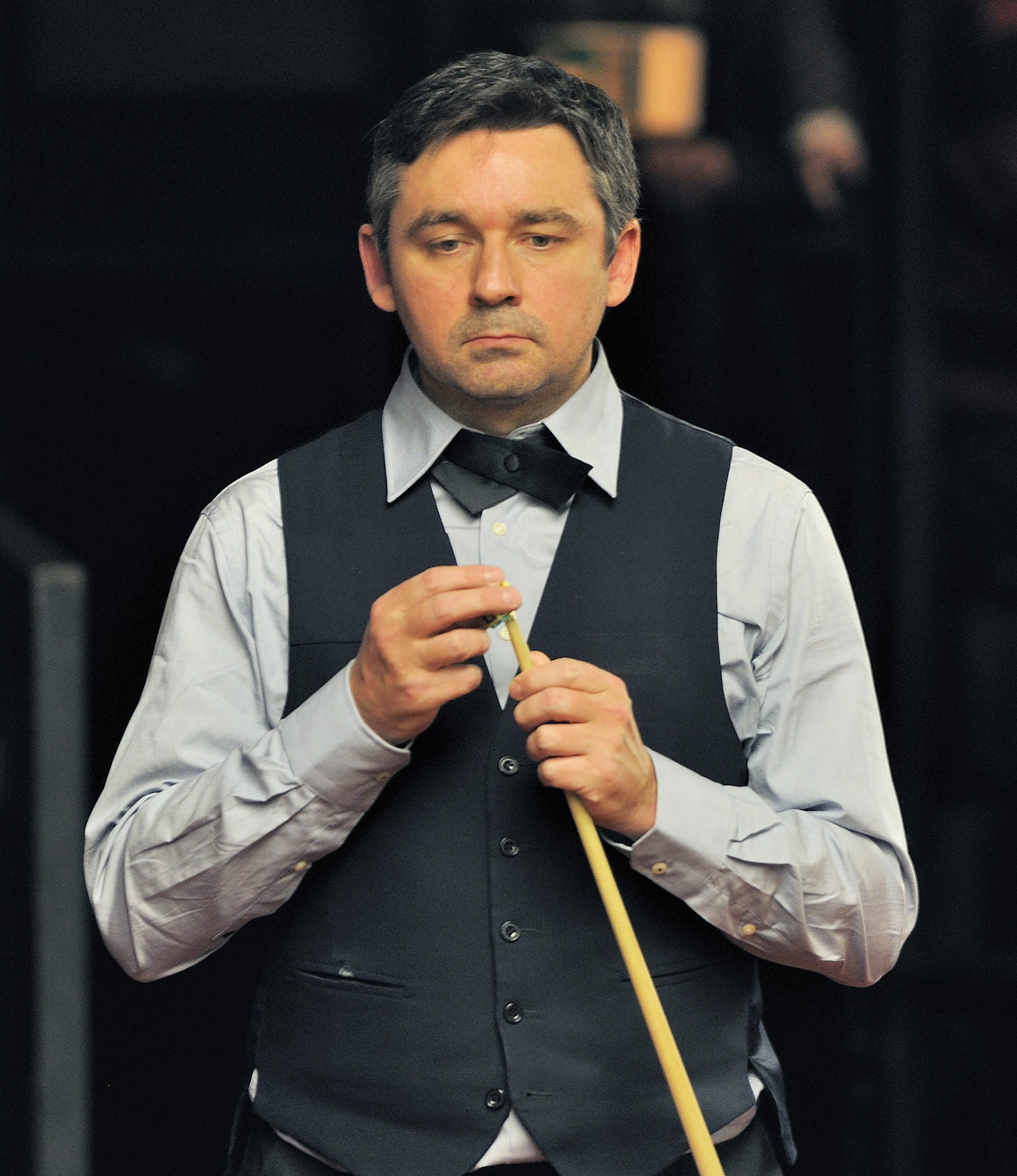
Alan McManus (pictured in 2014) was the only player to be whitewashed in the tournament

The first round of the competition, in which sixteen players took part, was played between 1 and 4 February 2004. In the first match, defending champion Mark Williams won against fellow Welshman and world number nine Matthew Stevens, 6–5. Stevens compiled breaks of 105 and 92, to take a 3–1 lead, but Williamsn went ahead 5–3 after winning four frames in a row. However, Stevens claimed the next two frames after fluking a red ball and potting the coloured balls, to force a final frame decider. Stevens was leading 48–0 in points when he missed a blue ball shot to the middle pocket, allowing Williams to win the match. Two-time Masters champion Paul Hunter faced David Gray in his first round match. The first frame was restarted after 17 minutes due to inactivity on the table; Hunter clinched the frame on a black ball after Gray incurred 10 penalty points while leading 66–1. Hunter extended his lead with a break of 51, but Gray responded with a 70 break. Hunter led 3–1 at the mid-session interval, but Gray reduced Hunter's advantage again, this time with a break of 67. Hunter won two of the next three frames to take the score to 5–3, and a break of 74 in the ninth frame gave him a 6–3 win, setting up a quarter-final encounter with Williams.

World number three and 1995 Masters champion, Ronnie O'Sullivan, took a 6–0 whitewash over 1994 winner Alan McManus . During a match that lasted 1 hour and 50 minutes, McManus' highest break was just 44. O'Sullivan equalled that in the second frame and compiled a 75 break in the fourth. He took advantage of McManus missing two opportunities to pot the blue ball, claiming match victory and giving McManus his first Masters whitewash in his 13th appearance. John Higgins, world number four and 1999 Masters champion, defeated fellow Scotsman Graeme Dott 6–4. Playing with a new cue (having intentionally destroyed his old one at a motorway service station), Dott took the first frame with a clearance of 34. Higgins then compiled breaks of 70, 63, and 100, to lead 3–1 at the mid-session interval. However, Dott managed to level the scoreline after the next two frames, thanks to a poor positional shot from Higgins on a final blue ball, and they shared the next two frames bringing the score to 4–4. Higgins took the ninth frame, winning a safety battle over the pink, and he clinched frame 10 to advance to the quarter-finals. Higgins' victory continued Dott's streak of failing to win any matches at the Wembley Conference Centre.

Ken Doherty compiled breaks of 89 and 81 to hold a 3–1 advantage over his opponent Steve Davis at the mid-session interval of their first round match. Davis denied Doherty an early victory in frame seven when he potted the last four coloured balls to snatch the frame; he also took the next frame to reduce his deficit to 3–5. However, a 33 break from Doherty ended the match 6–3 in his favour, after more than 3 1/2 hours of play. Afterwards, Davis complained about cold air entering the venue, which dampened the cloth and caused the chalk to stick to the cue ball. Stephen Lee took the first frame of his match against Ding Junhui, who won the next three frames—with the help of an 84 break—for a 3–1 lead at the interval. Following Lee's fifth frame win, Ding compiled breaks of 81, 83, and 89, to go 5–2 ahead, but Lee responded to claim frame eight on a re-spotted black ball, before taking the ninth with a clearance of 54. Lee also took the tenth frame to force a final frame decider; he then made a break of 85 in the last frame to claim a 6–5 victory, booking his place in the quarter-finals.

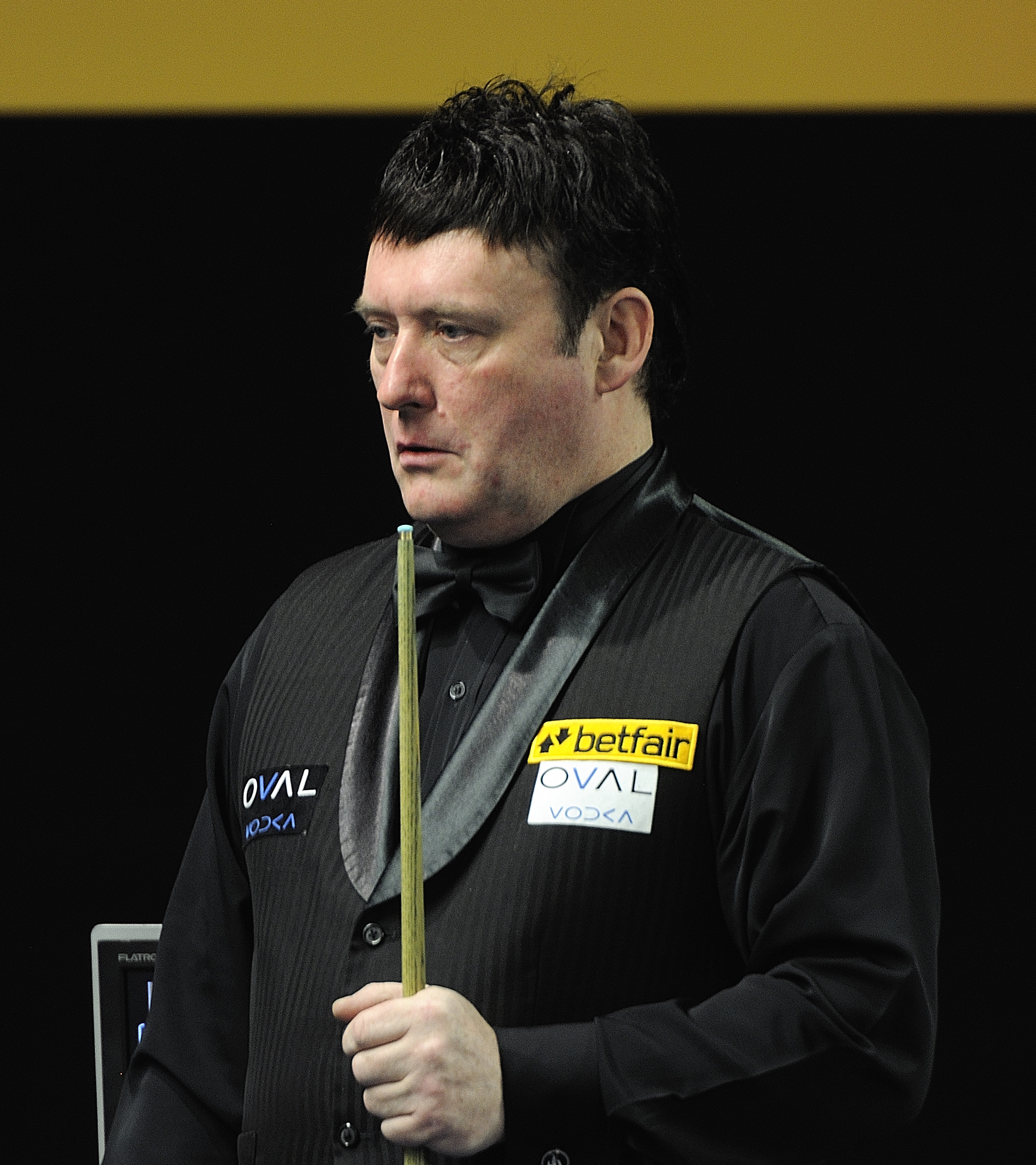
Jimmy White (pictured in 2013) defeated six-time Masters champion Stephen Hendry for the first time out of seven attempts at the Wembley Conference Centre

Jimmy White defeated six-time Masters champion Stephen Hendry 6–4, in a match disrupted by noise from an over-enthusiastic partisan crowd that referee Colin Brinded had attempted to control. White won the first frame with a 54 break, but a fluke on a red ball in the second gave Hendry the impetus to win the next two frames with breaks of 97 and 75. White took the fourth frame to equalise the scoreline, until Hendry made his 632nd career century break (102) to win the fifth. White then made a clearance of 40, after Hendry missed a shot on the pink ball to a middle pocket in frame six, and White took the lead. A 36 clearance and a 51 break won him the match, his first against Hendry at the Wembley Conference Centre in seven attempts. After the match, White apologised to Hendry for the crowd's disrespectful behaviour; a female spectator had been ejected and escorted out of the arena by security after she ignored repeated warnings over disrupting the match. White also voiced a complaint about the playing conditions, and the WPBSA conducted a meticulous investigation of the table's mechanics on 4 February, to correct any imperfections prior to the start of the quarter-finals.

In the last of the first round matches, Quinten Hann responded to an early century break from his opponent Peter Ebdon to take a 2–1 lead, but a playing error, in which Hann potted the cue ball from a screwback on the pink ball, allowed Ebdon to level the scoreline with a break of 55. They shared the next two frames, but Hann conceded the seventh after missing the final red ball, despite trailing by only 21 points in the frame. Edbon forged ahead, claiming the next two frames to win the match 6–3. At the post-match press conference, Hann put the decline in his performance down to hunger, which had lowered his concentration after the mid-session interval, "This wasn't the first time it's happened. I enjoy playing Peter but the game did drag on. I got some chocolate at the end but it was too little too late."

=== Quarter-finals ===
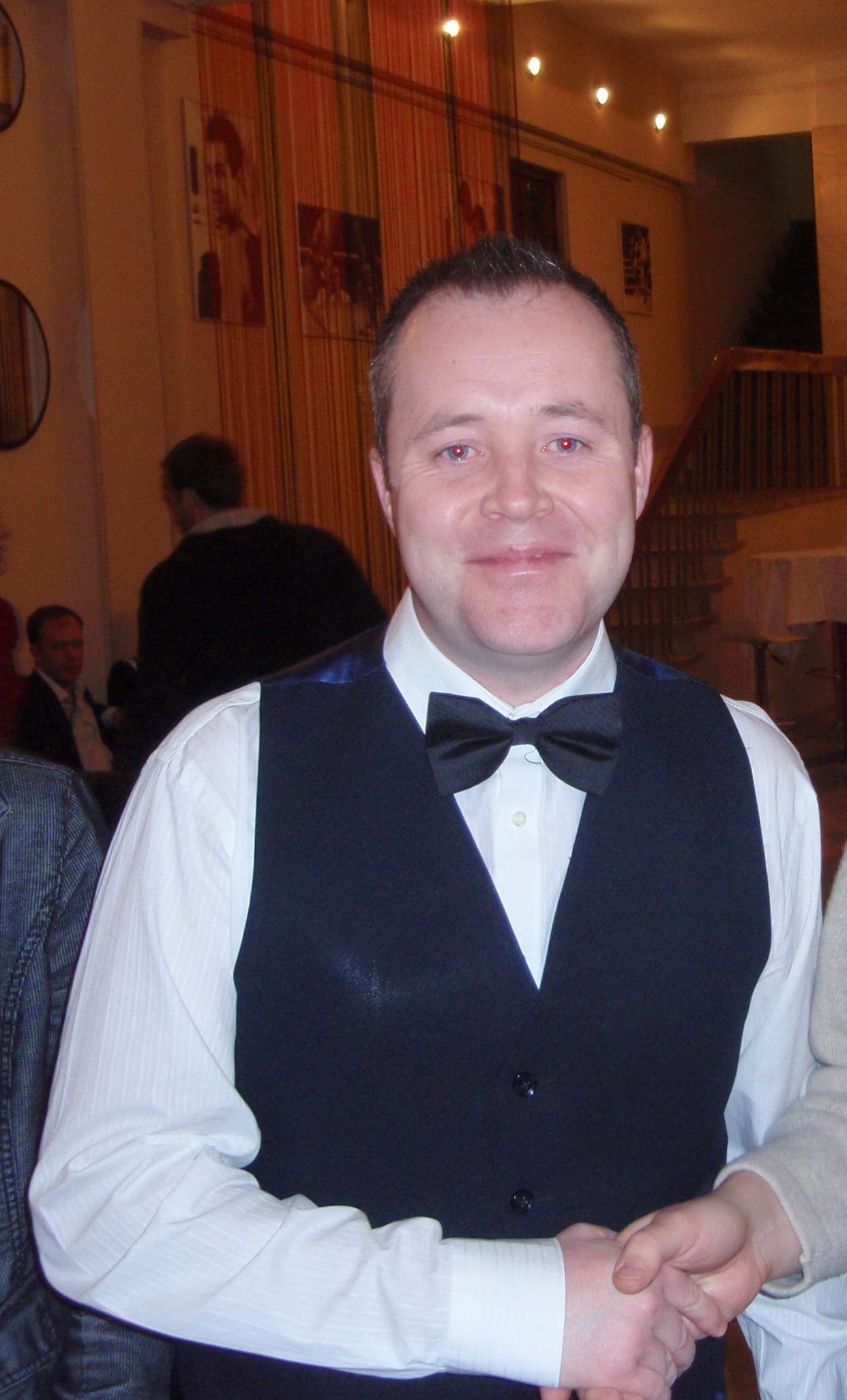
John Higgins (pictured in 2008) won his second match of the tournament, 6–3 over Ken Doherty.

The quarter-finals took place on 5 and 6 February 2004. Hunter took an early lead of 3–1 in the first quarter-final, but Williams then won four of the next five frames, with breaks of 66, 77, 52 and 101, to move 5–4 ahead. Williams looked set to win the match in frame ten with a 51–12 lead, but a strong ricochet off the top right-hand corner pocket sent the cue ball down the table and Hunter made a 65 clearance to force a final frame decider. Hunter built a 63–16 lead, and despite a missed long-range red ball that provided Williams with a failed opportunity to pot a long-range yellow in the bottom right-hand pocket, won the match for his third career victory over Williams. Higgins won the 34-minute opening frame of his quarter-final match against Lee, who then compiled a half-century break of 51 in the second frame, before ending the next with a black ball shot on a 36 run. The match levelled at 4–4 and Higgins won the next two frames (with a 71 break in the ninth) to end it 6–4 and advance to the semi-finals. Higgins criticised the table conditions afterwards: "The table was atrocious. We played with a light white, and the cushions were bouncing all over the place. Neither of us played well, but the conditions didn't help."

O'Sullivan defeated Doherty 6–3 in the third quarter-final. Doherty began well by winning the first frame but O'Sullivan went unchallenged in the next three frames to score 260 points, including breaks of 43, 87 and 75, to lead 3–1 going into the mid-session interval. They shared frames five and six; Doherty won frame seven after O'Sullivan was snookered on the final red, and O'Sullivan took the next frame on the pink ball. Although Doherty scored a break of 61 in the ninth frame, he could not sustain his form and O'Sullivan claimed victory on the black ball from a 38 clearance. The last quarter-final saw Ebdon compete against White, in front of a calmer crowd. White made century breaks of 118 and 101 in the first and fifth frames, followed by another by Ebdon in the sixth, and the score went level at 3–3. Ebdon won the next frame to briefly take the lead, but White won frames eight and nine, and with Ebdon unable to respond, White won the match 6–4 with a break of 45 in the tenth frame. He entered the semi-finals of the Masters at the Wembley Conference Centre for the tenth time in his career.

=== Semi-finals ===
Both of the semi-finals were played on 7 February 2004. Hunter opened proceedings with a break of 96 in the first frame of his semi-final match against Higgins, but his lead was short-lived as Higgins responded by compiling a 110 break in the second frame and winning frames three and four to enter the mid-session interval 3–1 ahead. Higgins took the fifth frame on the blue ball and Hunter won the sixth with a break of 68. Higgins clinched the 27-minute-long seventh frame on a re-spotted black ball, but his chances of victory were over when Hunter claimed the next two frames to win the match 6–3, following a safety shot exchange on the final pink ball. Higgins again voiced criticism of the table's playing conditions after the match, "It was torture out there. We were playing with a light white, and the cushions were an absolute joke. I just couldn't get hold of the cue ball, and we shouldn't have to play on that. The table was a disgrace. Top players are not used to it. I've asked for something to be done. It's a sad day for snooker when no one listens to the players." Cloth manufacturer Milliken & Company concluded that the table conditions were "perfect as they could be" for the cloth.

O'Sullivan faced White in the second semi-final match later that evening. White won the opening frame and O'Sullivan produced the tournament's highest break (a 138 clearance) in the second frame to level the score. He then took frame three after an early foul from White on a black ball, but the two players were equal at the mid-session interval, after which play became disjointed and the two remained tied after the eighth frame. A break of 56 from O'Sullivan, and a shot from his opponent that left a red ball over a corner pocket, allowed him to win 6–4 and set up an encounter with Hunter in the final. Following the semi-final, O'Sullivan stated his belief that he was benefiting from a different approach and attitude, "There is no point in being attacking and being careless at the same time and I was enjoying the struggle out there. It was a psychological battle I was having with myself. It was a chance for me to see how deep I could go and deal with things and be at one with myself." White admitted his past mental and physical effort during the Masters wore him out, "I am sad because I didn't feel right at all and if I had been playing anywhere near the way I have, I might have won."

=== Final ===
The best-of-19 frames final match took place over two sessions on 8 February 2004. Hunter defeated O'Sullivan to lift his third Masters title in four years (having previously won the 2001 and 2002 tournaments). In doing so, he joined Cliff Thorburn and Stephen Hendry as one of only three players to win the Masters tournament three or more times. The victory earned Hunter £100,000, while O'Sullivan received £50,000 and an extra £10,000 for compiling the tournament's highest break (138). The correspondent for The Scotsman noted that the match was hailed as "one of the highest-quality matches witnessed in snooker", and Brian Burside of The Independent recorded that Hunter had "scored the most remarkable win in the history of the Masters". The match was broadcast on BBC Two, with an average television audience of 3.4 million, up by 900,000 over the 2003 final, with a peak audience of 5 million viewers.

O'Sullivan took advantage of Hunter's aggressive playing style to win the first two frames with breaks of 56 and 80; Hunter responded with a 117 break to clinch the third. O'Sullivan then moved ahead 6–1 within 42 minutes, with further breaks of 86, 87, 84, and 79, while Hunter potted a solitary ball during this period. However, Hunter concluded the 100-minute afternoon session with a 127 break to go 2–6 behind. In the first frame of the evening session, O'Sullivan overcame playing errors to take the ninth frame with a late break of 34. Hunter clinched the next four frames to take the score to 7–6 with breaks of 102 and 82 and executing successful long-range pots. O'Sullivan missed pottable red balls on scores of 28–0 and 59–16 but Hunter also faltered and O'Sullivan won the 14th frame. In the 15th, O'Sullivan missed a red ball shot along the top cushion and Hunter made a 109 break to again reduce the deficit to one frame. O'Sullivan restored his two-frame advantage in the next frame but Hunter compiled his fifth match century in the 17th, with a 110 clearance and a small clearance of 58; the 31-minute 18th frame took the match to a final frame decider. Hunter won the match and the tournament following a protracted safety exchange.

After his victory, Hunter praised O'Sullivan's performance in the first session and said of his own achievement: "I played really well all day. Even though I was 6–2 behind [after the first session] I'd made two centuries and I knew I was playing well. I was 6–2 down a few years ago against Fergal and I just stuck in there and that is what I did again and it went my way." O'Sullivan was philosophical about his defeat and said he was pleased for Hunter and his family, adding: "I was a little disappointed, but it is only a game of snooker. Someone has to win and someone has to lose and this time it was my turn to lose."

== Prize fund ==
The breakdown of prize money for this year is shown below:

Qualifying stage

- Winner: £7,000
- Runner-up: £3,000
- Semi-final: £2,200
- Quarter-final: £1,700
- Last 16: £1,200
- Last 32: £800
- Last 64: £400
- Highest break: £600

Televised stage

- Winner: £100,000
- Runner-up: £50,000
- Semi-final: £25,000
- Quarter-final: £12,500
- Last 16: £9,500
- Last 18 (wild-cards): £7,000
- Highest break: £10,000
- Maximum break: £25,000

- Tournament total: £400,000

== Results ==
=== Wild-card round ===
Numbers given in brackets after players names show the 15th and 16th seeds in the competition. Players in bold indicate match winners.

Match	Date		Score	
WC1	1 February	**Jimmy White (ENG)** (15)	**6**–2	Neil Robertson (AUS)
WC2	2 February	Joe Perry (ENG) (16)	3–**6**	**Ding Junhui (CHN)**

=== Main draw ===
Numbers to the left of players' names show the remainder of the seeds in the tournament. Players in bold denote match winners.

Last 16; Best of 11 frames
1	**Mark Williams** (WAL)	**6**
9	Matthew Stevens (WAL)	5
8	**Paul Hunter** (ENG)	**6**
12	David Gray (ENG)	3
5	**Stephen Lee** (ENG)	**6**
Ding Junhui (CHN)	5
4	**John Higgins** (SCO)	**6**
13	Graeme Dott (SCO)	4
3	**Ronnie O'Sullivan** (ENG)	**6**
10	Alan McManus (SCO)	0
6	**Ken Doherty** (IRL)	**6**
11	Steve Davis (ENG)	3
7	**Peter Ebdon** (ENG)	**6**
14	Quinten Hann (AUS)	3
2	Stephen Hendry (SCO)	4
15	**Jimmy White** (ENG)	**6**

Quarter-finals; Best of 11 frames
1	(Wales) Mark Williams	5
8	(England) **Paul Hunter**	**6**
5	(England) Stephen Lee	4
4	(Scotland) **John Higgins**	**6**
3	(England) **Ronnie O'Sullivan**	**6**
6	(Republic of Ireland) Ken Doherty	3
7	(England) Peter Ebdon	4
15	(England) **Jimmy White**	**6**

Semi-finals; Best of 11 frames
8	(England) **Paul Hunter**	**6**
4	(Scotland) John Higgins	3
3	(England) **Ronnie O'Sullivan**	**6**
15	(England) Jimmy White	4

Final; Best of 19 frames
8	(England) **Paul Hunter**	**10**
3	(England) Ronnie O'Sullivan	9

=== Final ===
Scores in bold are the winning frame scores and the winning player. Breaks over 50 are indicated in brackets.

Final: Best of 19 frames. Referee: Jan Verhaas; Wembley Conference Centre, London, England, 8 February 2004.
**Paul Hunter** (8); England	**10**–9	Ronnie O'Sullivan (3); England
Afternoon: 22–**59** (56), 26–**80** (80), **117**–8 (117), 1–**86** (86), 0–**87** (87), 22–**84** (84), 7–**124** (79), **127**–0 (127); Evening: 47–**84**, **90**–0, **102**–27 (102), **82**–9 (82), **76**–0, 32–**97**, **109**–21 (109), 0–**86**, **142**–0 (110), **72**–35 (58), **63**–15
**127**	Highest break	87
**5**	Century breaks	0
**7**	50+ breaks	6

== Century breaks ==
The 2004 Masters featured a total of 19 century breaks made by 9 different players over the course of the competition. O'Sullivan made the highest break of a 138 in the second frame of his semi-final match with White.

- 138 – Ronnie O'Sullivan
- 127, 117, 110, 109, 102, 101 – Paul Hunter
- 118, 108 – Ding Junhui
- 115, 101 – Jimmy White
- 110, 100 – John Higgins
- 108, 102 – Peter Ebdon
- 105 – Matthew Stevens
- 103, 101 – Mark Williams
- 101 – Stephen Hendry
