= 2004 Welsh Open (snooker) =

Tournament information
- Dates: 15–25 January 2004
- Venue: Welsh Institute of Sport
- City: Cardiff
- Country: Wales
- Organisation: WPBSA
- Format: Ranking event
- Total prize fund: £450,000
- Winner's share: £52,000
- Highest break: Ronnie O'Sullivan (ENG) (139)

Final
- Champion: Ronnie O'Sullivan (ENG)
- Runner-up: Steve Davis (ENG)
- Score: 9–8

The 2004 Welsh Open was a professional ranking snooker tournament that took place between 15 and 25 January at the Welsh Institute of Sport in Cardiff, Wales.

Stephen Hendry was the defending champion, but he lost in the quarter-finals 4–5 against Marco Fu.

Ronnie O'Sullivan recovered from 5–8 down to defeat Steve Davis 9–8 in the final. This was O'Sullivan's 14th ranking title of his career.

== Tournament summary ==
Defending champion Stephen Hendry was the number 1 seed with World Champion Mark Williams seeded 2. The remaining places were allocated to players based on the world rankings.

== Prize fund ==
The breakdown of prize money for this year is shown below:

- Winner: £52,000
- Runner-up: £26,000
- Semi-final: £13,000
- Quarter-final: £9,500
- Last 16: £7,450
- Last 32: £5,600
- Last 48: £3,900
- Last 64: £2,750
- Last 80: £1,750
- Last 96: £1,100
- Stage one highest break: £1,800
- Stage two highest break: £5,000
- Stage one maximum break: £5,000
- Stage two maximum break: £20,000
- Total: £450,000

== Main draw ==
Last 48; Best of 9 frames
29 | (England) Mark Selby | 5
34 | (Thailand) James Wattana | 3
27 | (Northern Ireland) Joe Swail | 5
35 | (England) Mark Davis | 2
19 | (Hong Kong) Marco Fu | 5
(China) Liu Song | 3
32 | (Finland) Robin Hull | 0
39 | (England) Michael Holt | 5
24 | (Malta) Tony Drago | 4
36 | (England) Barry Pinches | 5
21 | (England) Robert Milkins | 5
(Wales) Paul Davies | 2
22 | (England) Mark King | 5
55 | (England) Nick Dyson | 3
23 | (England) Dave Harold | w/d
56 | (Scotland) Marcus Campbell | w/o
31 | (Wales) Anthony Davies | 2
37 | (Republic of Ireland) Michael Judge | 5
26 | (England) Ian McCulloch | 3
58 | (England) Mike Dunn | 5
20 | (England) Anthony Hamilton | 5
61 | (Belgium) Bjorn Haneveer | 3
25 | (Scotland) Drew Henry | 5
63 | (Wales) Darren Morgan | 1
18 | (Scotland) Chris Small | 5
41 | (Scotland) Stephen Maguire | 4
30 | (England) John Parrott | 5
(Northern Ireland) Patrick Wallace | 2
28 | (Wales) Dominic Dale | 5
42 | (England) Barry Hawkins | 3
17 | (England) Ali Carter | 2
47 | (England) Stuart Pettman | 5

Last 32; Best of 9 frames
1 | (Scotland) Stephen Hendry | 5
29 | (England) Mark Selby | 1
15 | (England) Jimmy White | 5
27 | (Northern Ireland) Joe Swail | 2
9 | (Wales) Matthew Stevens | 2
19 | (Hong Kong) Marco Fu | 5
6 | (Republic of Ireland) Ken Doherty | 5
39 | (England) Michael Holt | 3
5 | (England) Stephen Lee | 5
36 | (England) Barry Pinches | 3
12 | (England) David Gray | 2
21 | (England) Robert Milkins | 5
11 | (England) Steve Davis | 5
22 | (England) Mark King | 3
4 | (Scotland) John Higgins | 5
56 | (Scotland) Marcus Campbell | 1
3 | (England) Ronnie O'Sullivan | 5
37 | (Republic of Ireland) Michael Judge | 0
16 | (England) Joe Perry | 5
58 | (England) Mike Dunn | 1
14 | (Australia) Quinten Hann | 2
20 | (England) Anthony Hamilton | 5
8 | (England) Paul Hunter | 5
25 | (Scotland) Drew Henry | 1
7 | (England) Peter Ebdon | 5
18 | (Scotland) Chris Small | 4
10 | (Scotland) Alan McManus | 5
30 | (England) John Parrott | 3
13 | (Scotland) Graeme Dott | 1
28 | (Wales) Dominic Dale | 5
2 | (Wales) Mark Williams | 5
47 | (England) Stuart Pettman | 3

Last 16; Best of 9 frames
1 | (Scotland) Stephen Hendry | 5
15 | (England) Jimmy White | 3
19 | (Hong Kong) Marco Fu | 5
6 | (Republic of Ireland) Ken Doherty | 1
5 | (England) Stephen Lee | 1
21 | (England) Robert Milkins | 5
11 | (England) Steve Davis | 5
4 | (Scotland) John Higgins | 1
3 | (England) Ronnie O'Sullivan | 5
16 | (England) Joe Perry | 2
20 | (England) Anthony Hamilton | 0
8 | (England) Paul Hunter | 5
7 | (England) Peter Ebdon | 4
10 | (Scotland) Alan McManus | 5
28 | (Wales) Dominic Dale | 5
2 | (Wales) Mark Williams | 3

Quarter-finals; Best of 9 frames
1 | (Scotland) Stephen Hendry | 4
19 | (Hong Kong) Marco Fu | 5
21 | (England) Robert Milkins | 4
11 | (England) Steve Davis | 5
3 | (England) Ronnie O'Sullivan | 5
8 | (England) Paul Hunter | 2
10 | (Scotland) Alan McManus | 4
28 | (Wales) Dominic Dale | 5

Semi-finals; Best of 11 frames
19 | (Hong Kong) Marco Fu | 3
11 | (England) Steve Davis | 6
3 | (England) Ronnie O'Sullivan | 6
28 | (Wales) Dominic Dale | 1

Final; Best of 17 frames
11 | (England) Steve Davis | 8
3 | (England) Ronnie O'Sullivan | 9

== Final ==
Final: Best of 17 frames. Referee: Paul Collier. Welsh Institute of Sport, Cardiff, Wales, 25 January 2004.
| Steve Davis (11); England | 8–9 | Ronnie O'Sullivan (3); England |
Afternoon: 78–30, 74–0 (74), 72–30, 9–76 (58), 67–65, 45–84, 12–129 (125), 0–139 (139); Evening: 68–63 (O'Sullivan 62), 71–25 (66), 4–103 (103), 79–42 (53), 53–48, 0–118 (118), 40–81 (77), 55–74, 26–92
| 74 | Highest break | 139 |
| 0 | Century breaks | 4 |
| 3 | 50+ breaks | 7 |

== Qualifying ==
Qualifying for the tournament took place at Pontins in Prestatyn, Wales between 9 and 13 December 2003.

=== Round 1 ===
Best of 9 frames

| (England) Craig Butler | 5–4 | (Thailand) Supoj Saenla |
| (England) Joe Johnson | w/d–w/o | (Republic of Ireland) Joe Delaney |
| (Wales) Ryan Day | 5–3 | (England) Chris Melling |
| (England) Adrian Gunnell | 0–5 | (Norway) Kurt Maflin |
| (England) Luke Fisher | 0–5 | (China) Liu Song |
| (Thailand) Kwan Poomjang | 2–5 | (England) Paul Sweeny |
| (Republic of Ireland) Colm Gilcreest | 4–5 | (Australia) Steve Mifsud |
| (England) Jamie Cope | w/o–w/d | (Canada) Alain Robidoux |
| (England) Ricky Walden | 4–5 | (Wales) Philip Williams |
| (Northern Ireland) Jason Prince | 3–5 | (England) James Leadbetter |
| (Wales) Paul Davies | 5–1 | (England) Steven Bennie |
| (England) Jason Ferguson | 1–5 | (Cyprus) Mehmet Husnu |
| (Iceland) Kristján Helgason | w/d–w/o | (England) Michael Wild |
| (England) Wayne Brown | 5–1 | (England) Tom Ford |
| (Thailand) Atthasit Mahitthi | 3–5 | (England) Darryn Walker |
| (Australia) Johl Younger | 5–1 | (Wales) Ian Sargeant |

| (Scotland) Martin Dziewialtowski | 5–0 | (England) Stephen Croft |
| (England) Paul Wykes | 5–3 | (England) Andy Neck |
| (England) Matthew Couch | 5–4 | (Wales) Ian Preece |
| (England) Andrew Norman | 5–1 | (England) Carlo Giagnacovo |
| (England) Peter Lines | 5–4 | (China) Ding Junhui |
| (England) David Gilbert | w/o–w/d | (England) Michael Rhodes |
| (England) Tony Jones | 4–5 | (Scotland) Scott MacKenzie |
| (Republic of Ireland) Leo Fernandez | 5–2 | (Republic of Ireland) Garry Hardiman |
| (Wales) Lee Walker | 5–1 | (England) Stuart Mann |
| (England) Bradley Jones | 5–3 | (England) Ian Brumby |
| (England) Simon Bedford | 5–1 | (Northern Ireland) Joe Meara |
| (England) Munraj Pal | 3–5 | (England) Luke Simmonds |
| (England) Andrew Higginson | 5–2 | (Australia) Neil Robertson |
| (Northern Ireland) Terry Murphy | 4–5 | (England) Martin Gould |
| (England) Rory McLeod | 5–4 | (England) Adrian Rosa |
| (Scotland) Billy Snaddon | 0–5 | (Scotland) Gary Thomson |

=== Round 2–4 ===
Round 2 Best of 9 frames
(England) Craig Butler | 5
(Republic of Ireland) Joe Delaney | 3
(Wales) Ryan Day | 5
(Norway) Kurt Maflin | 3
(China) Liu Song | 5
(England) Paul Sweeny | 4
(Australia) Steve Mifsud | 2
(England) Jamie Cope | 5
(Wales) Philip Williams | 5
(England) James Leadbetter | 0
(Wales) Paul Davies | 5
(Cyprus) Mehmet Husnu | 3
(England) Michael Wild | 1
(England) Wayne Brown | 5
(England) Darryn Walker | 5
(Australia) Johl Younger | 4
(Scotland) Martin Dziewialtowski | 4
(England) Paul Wykes | 5
(England) Matthew Couch | 4
(England) Andrew Norman | 5
(England) Peter Lines | 3
(England) David Gilbert | 5
(Scotland) Scott MacKenzie | 5
(Republic of Ireland) Leo Fernandez | 2
(Wales) Lee Walker | 1
(England) Bradley Jones | 5
(England) Simon Bedford | 3
(England) Luke Simmonds | 5
(England) Andrew Higginson | 5
(England) Martin Gould | 4
(England) Rory McLeod | 1
(Scotland) Gary Thomson | 5

Round 3 Best of 9 frames
(England) Dave Finbow | 5
(England) Craig Butler | 2
(England) Alfie Burden | 5
(Wales) Ryan Day | 1
(England) Andy Hicks | 2
(China) Liu Song | 5
(England) Jimmy Michie | 5
(England) Jamie Cope | 3
(Pakistan) Shokat Ali | 5
(Wales) Philip Williams | 2
(England) Rod Lawler | 1
(Wales) Paul Davies | 5
(England) Nick Dyson | 5
(England) Wayne Brown | 4
(Scotland) Marcus Campbell | 5
(England) Darryn Walker | 4
(England) David Roe | 5
(England) Paul Wykes | 1
(England) Mike Dunn | 5
(England) Andrew Norman | 2
(Belgium) Bjorn Haneveer | 5
(England) David Gilbert | 3
(Wales) Darren Morgan | 5
(Scotland) Scott MacKenzie | 1
(England) Nick Walker | 5
(England) Bradley Jones | 3
(Northern Ireland) Patrick Wallace | 5
(England) Luke Simmonds | 4
(England) Sean Storey | 3
(England) Andrew Higginson | 5
(England) Shaun Murphy | 3
(Scotland) Gary Thomson | 5

Round 4 Best of 9 frames
(Thailand) James Wattana | 5
(England) Dave Finbow | 4
(England) Mark Davis | 5
(England) Alfie Burden | 1
(Republic of Ireland) Fergal O'Brien | 4
(China) Liu Song | 5
(England) Michael Holt | 5
(England) Jimmy Michie | 0
(England) Barry Pinches | 5
(Pakistan) Shokat Ali | 3
(Scotland) Jamie Burnett | 0
(Wales) Paul Davies | 5
(England) Stuart Bingham | 4
(England) Nick Dyson | 5
(England) Nigel Bond | 3
(Scotland) Marcus Campbell | 5
(Republic of Ireland) Michael Judge | 5
(England) David Roe | 3
(Northern Ireland) Gerard Greene | 4
(England) Mike Dunn | 5
(England) Gary Wilkinson | 1
(Belgium) Bjorn Haneveer | 5
(England) Jonathan Birch | 2
(Wales) Darren Morgan | 5
(Scotland) Stephen Maguire | 5
(England) Nick Walker | 3
(England) Brian Morgan | 1
(Northern Ireland) Patrick Wallace | 5
(England) Barry Hawkins | 5
(England) Andrew Higginson | 1
(England) Stuart Pettman | 5
(Scotland) Gary Thomson | 4

== Century breaks ==
=== Qualifying stage centuries ===
- 141 – Barry Pinches
- 139 – Phil Williams
- 124 – Mark Davis
- 122 – Liu Song
- 118 – Andrew Higginson
- 117 – Ding Junhui
- 117 – Darren Morgan
- 117 – Mehmet Husnu
- 115, 108 – Ryan Day
- 114 – Bjorn Haneveer
- 113 – David Gilbert
- 110 – James Wattana
- 106, 100 – Scott MacKenzie
- 100 – Chris Melling

=== Televised stage centuries ===
- 139, 125, 118, 116, 107, 103 – Ronnie O'Sullivan
- 137 – Stuart Pettman
- 133, 102 – John Higgins
- 133 – Barry Pinches
- 131 – Anthony Hamilton
- 128 – Joe Perry
- 127, 123, 117, 107 – Robert Milkins
- 123, 119, 105 – Peter Ebdon
- 123, 102 – Stephen Hendry
- 123 – Ali Carter
- 122 – Mark Selby
- 119, 107 – Patrick Wallace
- 119 – Marco Fu
- 116 – Bjorn Haneveer
- 105, 102 – Steve Davis
- 103, 101 – Tony Drago
- 103, 100 – Alan McManus
- 103 – Mark Williams
- 102 – Mark King
- 100 – Chris Small
