= 2002 China Open (snooker) =

China Open
Tournament information
- Dates: 24 February – 3 March 2002
- Venue: International Gymnastic Centre
- City: Shanghai
- Country: China
- Organisation: WPBSA
- Format: Ranking event
- Total prize fund: £450,000
- Winner's share: £50,000

Final
- Champion: Mark Williams (WAL)
- Runner-up: Anthony Hamilton (ENG)
- Score: 9–8

The 2002 China Open was a professional ranking snooker tournament that took place from 24 February to 3 March 2002 at the International Gymnastic Centre in Shanghai, China. It was the sixth ranking event of the 2001–02 season.

The reigning champion was Ronnie O'Sullivan, who was defeated 5–3 in the quarter-finals by Mark Selby. Mark Williams won in the final 9–8 against Anthony Hamilton.

== Wildcard round ==
Match		Score	
WC1	Mark Selby (ENG)	5–2	Ding Junhui (CHN)
WC2	Nick Walker (ENG)	5–3	Cai Jianzhong (CHN)

== Main draw ==
Last 32; Best of 9 frames
1	(England) Ronnie O'Sullivan	5
(England) Ali Carter	4
11	(England) Jimmy White	5
(England) Nick Dyson	0
10	(Northern Ireland) Joe Swail	4
(England) Mark Selby	5
5	(Scotland) Stephen Hendry	5
(England) Nick Walker	2
7	(England) Peter Ebdon	3
(Australia) Quinten Hann	5
13	(England) Mark King	3
(England) Anthony Hamilton	5
16	(Republic of Ireland) Fergal O'Brien	4
(England) Joe Perry	5
4	(Republic of Ireland) Ken Doherty	5
(Malta) Tony Drago	1
3	(Scotland) John Higgins	5
(England) John Parrott	1
15	(England) Dave Harold	5
(England) Mark Davis	0
14	(Scotland) Graeme Dott	3
(Wales) Darren Morgan	5
6	(Wales) Matthew Stevens	3
(Hong Kong) Marco Fu	5
9	(England) Paul Hunter	5
(Wales) Dominic Dale	0
8	(England) Stephen Lee	5
(England) Ian McCulloch	1
12	(Scotland) Alan McManus	0
(England) Steve Davis	5
2	(Wales) Mark Williams	5
(Wales) Anthony Davies	2

Last 16; Best of 9 frames
1	(England) Ronnie O'Sullivan	5
11	(England) Jimmy White	1
(England) Mark Selby	5
5	(Scotland) Stephen Hendry	1
(Australia) Quinten Hann	3
(England) Anthony Hamilton	5
(England) Joe Perry	2
4	(Republic of Ireland) Ken Doherty	5
3	(Scotland) John Higgins	5
15	(England) Dave Harold	2
(Wales) Darren Morgan	5
(Hong Kong) Marco Fu	2
9	(England) Paul Hunter	3
8	(England) Stephen Lee	5
(England) Steve Davis	2
2	(Wales) Mark Williams	5

Quarter-finals; Best of 9 frames
1	(England) Ronnie O'Sullivan	3
(England) Mark Selby	5
(England) Anthony Hamilton	5
4	(Republic of Ireland) Ken Doherty	4
3	(Scotland) John Higgins	5
(Wales) Darren Morgan	4
8	(England) Stephen Lee	4
2	(Wales) Mark Williams	5

Semi-finals; Best of 11 frames
(England) Mark Selby	3
(England) Anthony Hamilton	6
3	(Scotland) John Higgins	2
2	(Wales) Mark Williams	6

Final; Best of 17 frames
(England) Anthony Hamilton	8
2	(Wales) Mark Williams	9

== Final ==
Final: Best of 17 frames. International Gymnastic Centre, Shanghai, China. 3 March 2002.
Mark Williams; Wales	9–8	Anthony Hamilton; England
Afternoon: 2–60 (60), 92–1 (68), 5–69 (69), 63–52, 16–66, 5–113 (106), 73–16 (73), 40–72; Evening: 6–84 (84), 93–0 (93), 75–1, 0–93 (93), 0–71, 75–1, 60–14, 107–20 (107), 85–40
107	Highest break	106
1	Century breaks	1
4	50+ breaks	5
