= 2003 World Snooker Championship =

Professional snooker tournament

2003 Embassy World Snooker Championship
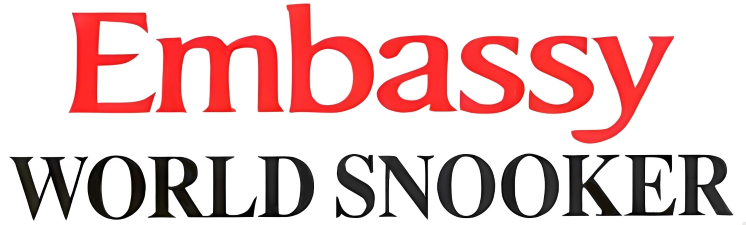

Tournament information
- Dates: 19 April – 5 May 2003
- Venue: Crucible Theatre
- City: Sheffield
- Country: England
- Organisation: WPBSA
- Format: Ranking event
- Total prize fund: £1,682,900
- Winner's share: £270,000
- Highest break: Ronnie O'Sullivan (ENG) (147)

Final
- Champion: Mark Williams (WAL)
- Runner-up: Ken Doherty (IRL)
- Score: 18–16

The 2003 World Snooker Championship (also referred to as the 2003 Embassy World Snooker Championship for the purposes of sponsorship) was a professional snooker tournament that took place from 19 April to 5 May 2003 at the Crucible Theatre in Sheffield, England. It was the final ranking event of the 2002–03 snooker season. This was the 27th consecutive year that the World Snooker Championship had been held at the Crucible, marking the 26th anniversary of the first staging of the event at this venue. The championships were sponsored by cigarette manufacturer Embassy.

Mark Williams won his second World Championship title by defeating Ken Doherty 18–16 in the final. Having won the UK Championship and the Masters earlier in the season, Williams held all three Triple Crown titles simultaneously. The defending champion, Peter Ebdon, lost 12–13 to Paul Hunter in the quarter-finals and became another first-time champion to fall to the Crucible curse by failing to defend his first world title. A total prize fund of £1,682,900 was awarded at the event, with the winner receiving £270,000.

== Overview ==
The World Snooker Championship is a professional tournament and the official world championship of the game of snooker. Founded in the late 19th century by British Army soldiers stationed in India, the sport was popular in the British Isles. However, in the modern era it has become increasingly popular worldwide, (Note: The "modern era" of snooker is understood to have started in 1969, when the World Championship reverted to a knockout format.) especially in East and Southeast Asian nations such as China, Hong Kong and Thailand.

The championship featured 32 professional players competing in one-on-one snooker matches in a single elimination format, each played over several frames. The 32 competitors in the main tournament were selected using a combination of the top players in the world snooker rankings and a pre-tournament qualification stage. Joe Davis won the first World Championship in 1927, the final match being held in Camkin's Hall, Birmingham, England. Since 1977, the event has been held in the Crucible Theatre in Sheffield, England.

=== Format ===
The championship was held from 19 April and 5 May 2003 at the Crucible Theatre in Sheffield, England, the 27th consecutive time that the tournament was held at the venue. It was the ninth and last ranking event of the 2002–03 snooker season on the World Snooker Tour. There were a total of 120 entrants from the tour, and the competition's main draw had 32 participants.

The top 16 players in the latest world rankings automatically qualified for the main draw as seeded players. As defending champion, Peter Ebdon was seeded first for the event, with world number 1 Ronnie O'Sullivan seeded 2; the remaining seeds were allocated based on the players' world ranking positions. Matches in the first round of the main draw were played as best-of-19-frames. The number of frames needed to win a match increased to 13 in the second round and quarter-finals, and 17 in the semi-finals; the final match was played as best-of-35-frames.

=== Prize fund ===
The breakdown of prize money for the event is shown below:

- Winner: £270,000
- Runner-up: £158,000
- Semi-final: £79,000
- Quarter-final: £39,500
- Last 16: £22,000
- Last 32: £15,000
- Highest break: £22,000
- Maximum break: £147,000
- Highest pre-TV break: £5,000
- Total: £1,682,900

== Tournament summary ==
=== First round ===
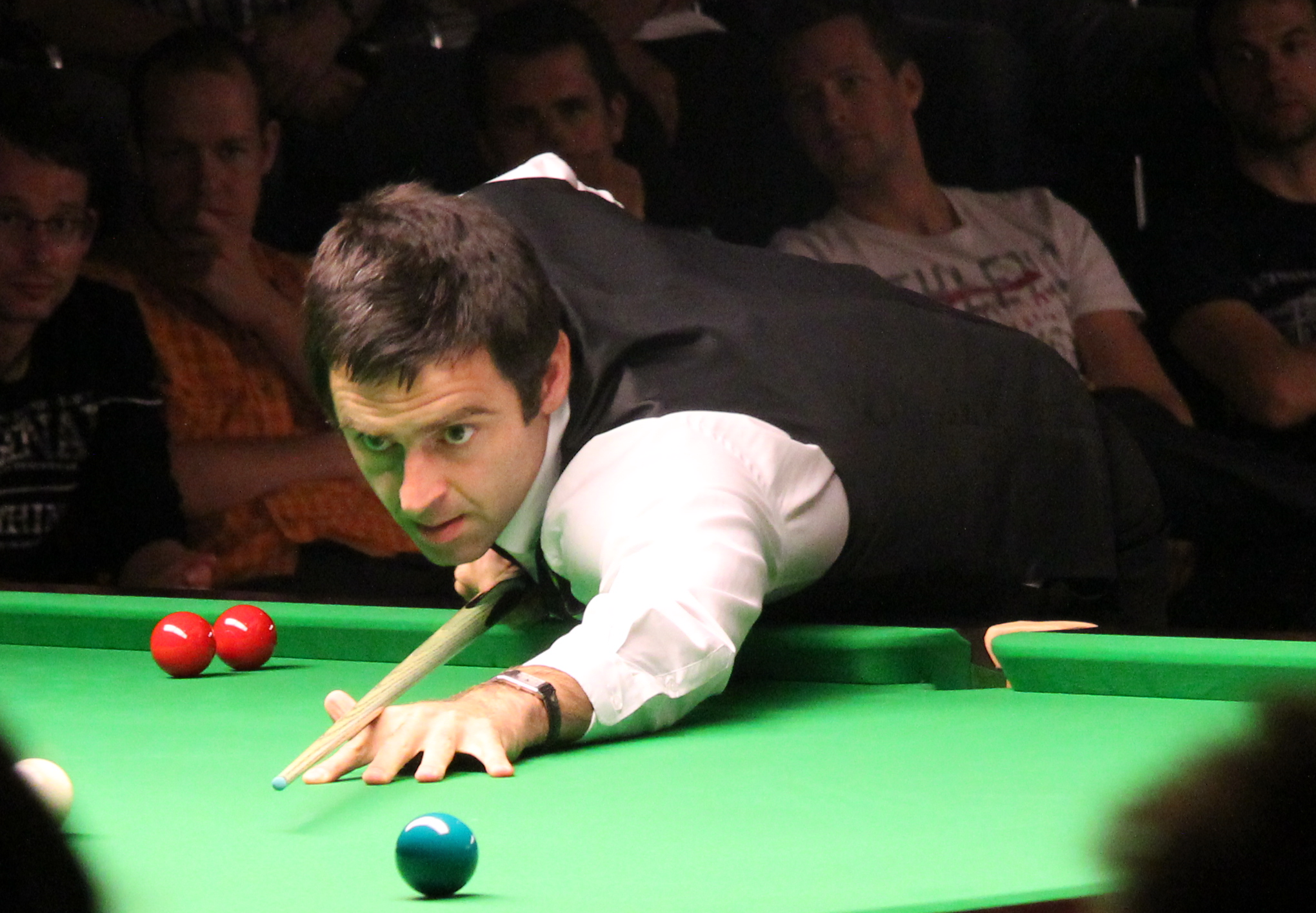
Ronnie O'Sullivan made a maximum break in the first round

The opening round was played from 19 to 24 April as the best-of-19 frames, held over two sessions. Ronnie O'Sullivan compiled a maximum break in his first-round match against Marco Fu, making him the first player to have scored two 147s at the venue. This was the fifth maximum compiled at the world championships and the first since O'Sullivan at the 1997 World Championship. However, Fu won the match 10–6. Stephen Hendry made a 132 break in his first round match against Gary Wilkinson, and became the first player to compile 100 century breaks at the Crucible. Hendry won the match 10–7.

The number one seed Peter Ebdon won the opening match of the event, with a 10–3 victory over Gerard Greene. Ebdon lead 4–3 but then won six frames in a row to win. Ebdon thanked stronger contact lenses for his ability to stay in the match. Ken Doherty led qualifier Shaun Murphy 8–4, but Murphy won four frames to tie the match at 8–8. The next two frames were tied, sending the match to a deciding frame, which was won on the final black ball by Doherty.

=== Second round ===
The second round was played from 24 to 28 April as the best-of-25 frames, held over three sessions. Mark Williams lost the opening two frames of his second-round match against Quinten Hann before winning 13 in a row – a record for a single match in the modern era of snooker – to triumph 13–2. Matthew Stevens played Paul Hunter, with Hunter compiling the 750th century at the Crucible in frame four. He led 12–4 after two sessions, and won 13–6. Ken Doherty had a second deciding frame in two matches as he defeated Graeme Dott. Doherty was 2–7 behind, but won 9 of the next 11 frames to lead 11–9. With the scores tied at 12–12, Doherty won a 42-minute final frame. In an all-Scottish clash, Stephen Hendry defeated Drew Henry 13–10 from 9–10 behind.

=== Quarter-finals ===
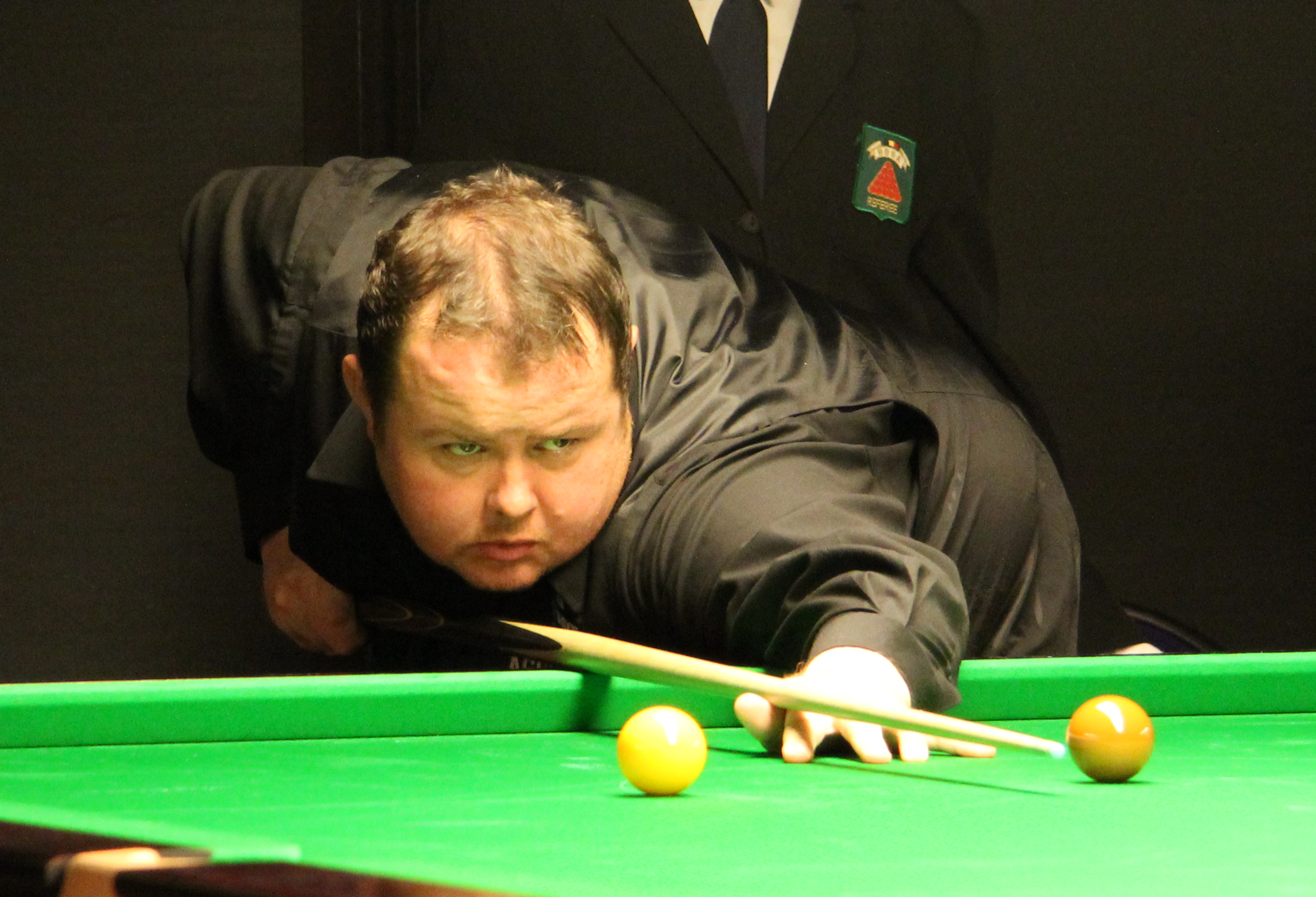
Stephen Lee won five frames in a row and reached his first semi-final

The quarter-final was played on 29 and 30 April as the best-of-25 frames played over three sessions. Paul Hunter defeated the defending champion Peter Ebdon in a deciding frame 13–12. The pair were tied 8–8 after the first two sessions, with Ebdon leading 10–9 after breaks of 76 and 109. Hunter won the next three frames with breaks of 55, 106 and 71 to be one frame from victory. Ebdon won the next two frames to tie the match 12–12 before Hunter won the decider. Having not reached a single final during his year as champion, Ebdon commented that "it's been a disappointing season".

In his match against John Higgins, Ken Doherty won the first ten frames, before Higgins took the next seven. In seeing his lead shrink, Doherty referred to it as the "biggest collapse since Wall Street in the 20s". Doherty eventually won the match 13–8. Mark Williams defeated seven-time champion Stephen Hendry 13–7. Stephen Lee and Marco Fu were tied at 4–4 after the first session of their match, but Lee won the next five frames to lead 9–4 and eventually won 13–7.

=== Semi-finals ===
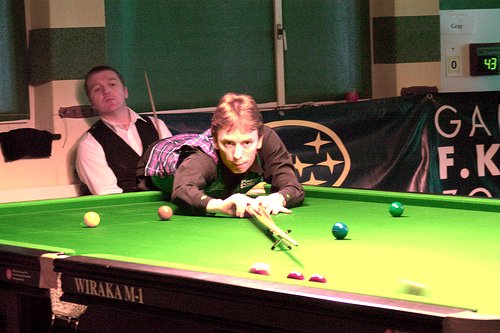
Ken Doherty was six frames behind, but won 17–16.

The semi-finals were played between 1 and 3 May, as the best-of-33 frames, held over four sessions. In the first semi-final, Ken Doherty trailed Paul Hunter 9–15 at the start of the final session with Hunter only requiring two more frames for victory. Doherty won five in a row to reduce the deficit to a single frame. Hunter took frame 30 to lead 16–14, but Doherty won all three remaining frames to win the match 17–16. After the match, Hunter commented that he was "devastated" by the result. A condensed version of the match was showcased on BBC Two on 28 April 2020 in place of the 2020 World Snooker Championship which was postponed because of the coronavirus pandemic.

The other semi-final was played between Mark Williams and Stephen Lee. Williams took an early 7–1 lead after the first session, but Lee won five of the eight frames in the second session to trail 10–6. Williams won the opening four frames of the third session, and lead 16–8 leading into the final session, and won the remaining frame to win 17–8. After the match, Lee called Williams "dangerous", whilst Williams suggested the opening session was when the match was won.

=== Final ===
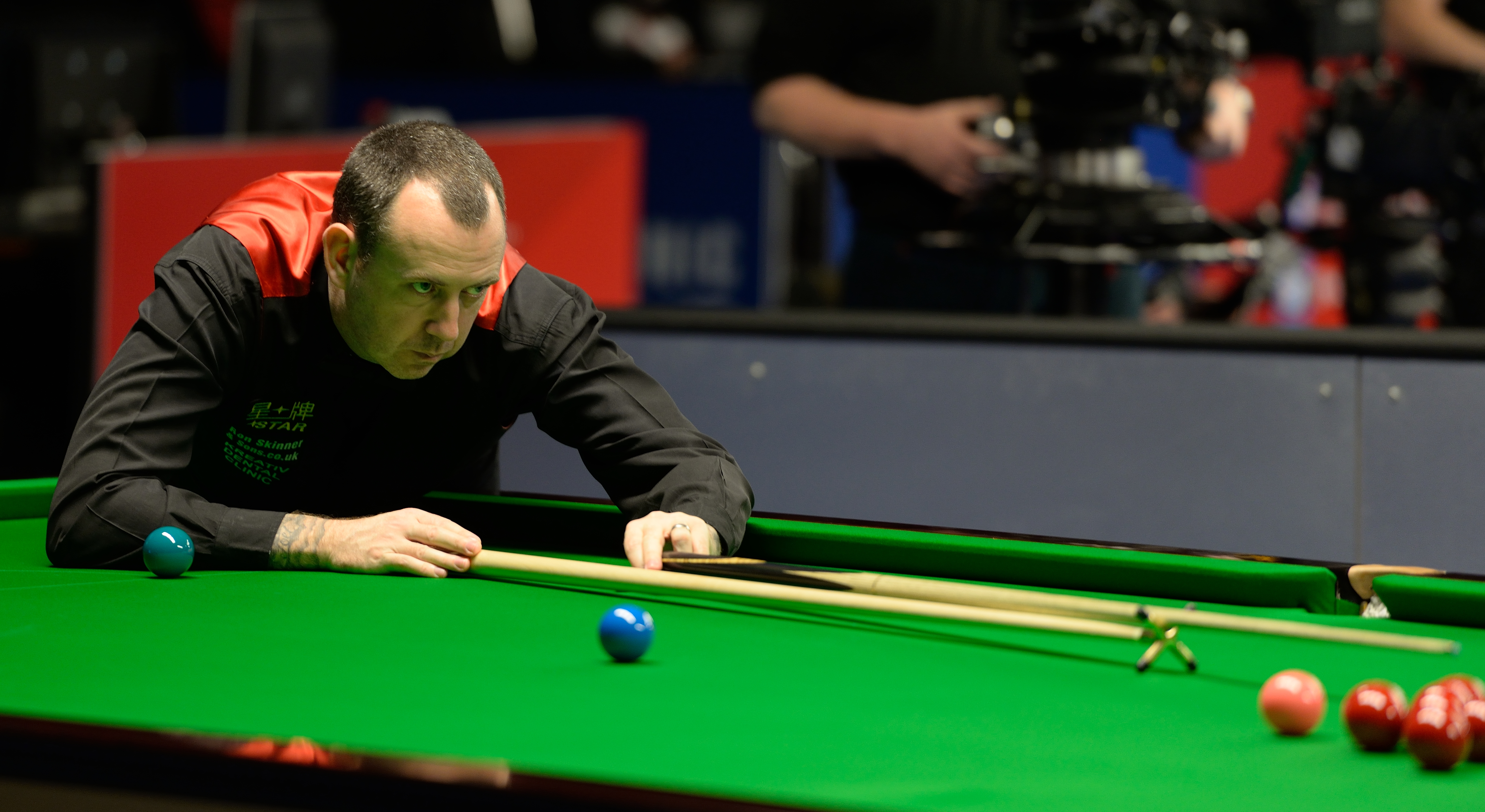
Mark Williams regained the world number one spot with a 18–16 win in the final.

The final was held on 4 and 5 May between Ken Doherty and Mark Williams as a best-of-35 frames match. The final was officiated by the Netherlands' Jan Verhaas, the youngest referee at a world final. Williams took an early lead in the final, leading at 6–2 after the first session, and extended the lead to 10–2 in the second session. Doherty won three of the remaining four frames in the session to leave Williams with an 11–5 lead overnight. On the resumption in the third session, Doherty won six frames in-a-row to tie the match at 11–11. The pair shared the next six frames with the scores tied at 14–14, before Williams won the next two frames to lead 16–14. Doherty won the next two, before Williams won frame 33 and then frame 34 with a break of 77 to win the match 18–16.

The win was Williams' second world championship, having won the title in 2000. In winning the event, Williams completed the Triple Crown, having also won the UK Championship and Masters in the season. He was only the third player to win these three events in a single season and is the most recent player to have achieved this. The win allowed Williams to become world number one again, the first player to regain the position under the current ranking system and only the second overall after Ray Reardon. Williams had only lost 19 frames through the first four rounds, winning 53. With three of his matches going to a deciding frame, Doherty played 132 out of a possible 137 frames in the tournament, a record for the modern era, with only his quarter final win over Higgins having been decided by more than two frames.

== Main draw ==
Shown below are the results for each round. The numbers in brackets represents players seeding, whilst those in bold denote match winners.

**First round** Best of 19 frames
19 April
**Peter Ebdon (ENG)** **(1)**	**10**
Gerard Greene (NIR)	3
22 & 23 April
Joe Swail (NIR) (16)	8
**Tony Drago (MLT)**	**10**
23 & 24 April
**Paul Hunter (ENG)** **(9)**	**10**
Ali Carter (ENG)	5
22 & 23 April
**Matthew Stevens (WAL)** **(8)**	**10**
Chris Small (SCO)	3
20 & 21 April
**Ken Doherty (IRL)** **(5)**	**10**
Shaun Murphy (ENG)	9
20 & 21 April
**Graeme Dott (SCO)** **(12)**	**10**
Robert Milkins (ENG)	4
19 & 20 April
Joe Perry (ENG) (13)	4
**Sean Storey (ENG)**	**10**
21 & 22 April
**John Higgins (SCO)** **(4)**	**10**
Ian McCulloch (ENG)	7
23 & 24 April
**Mark Williams (WAL)** **(3)**	**10**
Stuart Pettman (ENG)	2
19 & 20 April
**Quinten Hann (AUS)** **(14)**	**10**
John Parrott (ENG)	5
19 & 20 April
Mark King (ENG) (11)	5
**Drew Henry (SCO)**	**10**
19 & 20 April
**Stephen Hendry (SCO)** **(6)**	**10**
Gary Wilkinson (ENG)	7
21 April
**Stephen Lee (ENG)** **(7)**	**10**
Steve Davis (ENG)	6
22 & 23 April
**Jimmy White (ENG)** **(10)**	**10**
James Wattana (THA)	6
21 & 22 April
**Alan McManus (SCO)** **(15)**	**10**
Nigel Bond (ENG)	7
22 & 23 April
Ronnie O'Sullivan (ENG) (2)	6
**Marco Fu (HKG)**	**10**

**Second round** Best of 25 frames
24, 25 & 26 April
(England) **Peter Ebdon** **(1)**	**13**
(Malta) Tony Drago	5
27 & 28 April
(England) **Paul Hunter** **(9)**	**13**
(Wales) Matthew Stevens (8)	6
26, 27 & 28
(Republic of Ireland) **Ken Doherty** **(5)**	**13**
(Scotland) Graeme Dott (12)	12
25 & 26 April
(England) Sean Storey	7
(Scotland) **John Higgins** **(4)**	**13**
27 & 28 April
(Wales) **Mark Williams** **(3)**	**13**
(Australia) Quinten Hann (14)	2
24 & 25 April
(Scotland) Drew Henry	10
(Scotland) **Stephen Hendry** **(6)**	**13**
25 & 26 April
(England) **Stephen Lee** **(7)**	**13**
(England) Jimmy White (10)	11
26, 27 & 28 April
(Scotland) Alan McManus (15)	7
(Hong Kong) **Marco Fu**	**13**

**Quarter-finals**; Best of 25 frames
29 & 30 April
(England) Peter Ebdon (1)	12
(England) **Paul Hunter** **(9)**	**13**
29 & 30 April
(Republic of Ireland) **Ken Doherty** **(5)**	**13**
(Scotland) John Higgins (4)	8
29 & 30 April
(Wales) **Mark Williams** **(3)**	**13**
(Scotland) Stephen Hendry (6)	7
29 & 30 April
(England) **Stephen Lee** **(7)**	**13**
(Hong Kong) Marco Fu	7

**Semi-finals**; Best of 33 frames
1, 2 & 3 May
(England) Paul Hunter (9)	16
(Republic of Ireland) **Ken Doherty** **(5)**	**17**
1, 2 & 3 May
(Wales) **Mark Williams** **(3)**	**17**
(England) Stephen Lee (7)	8

**Final**; Best of 35 frames
4 and 5 May
(Republic of Ireland) Ken Doherty (5)	16
(Wales) **Mark Williams (3)**	**18**

**Final** (Best of 35 frames) Crucible Theatre, Sheffield. 4 and 5 May. Referee: Jan Verhaas.
Ken Doherty (5)
Ireland
16–**18**
**Mark Williams (3)**
Wales
37–60, 55–82, **97**–0, 29–73, 30–86, 12–82, 30–77, 56–75, **85**–24, 4–118, 1–76, 0–101, **79**–0, **70**–69, 0–75, **60**–51, **73**–10, **62**–31, **128**–6, **61**–17, **82**–49, **70**–39, 41–68, **115**–0, 19–62, **98**–23, 0–87, **78**–45, 0–121, 0–77, **68**–17, **120**–16, 28–96, 5–120
Century breaks: 6
(Doherty 3, Williams 3)

Highest break by Doherty: 128
Highest break by Williams: 120

37–**60**, 55–**82**, 97–0, 29–**73**, 30–**86**, 12–**82**, 30–**77**, 56–**75**, 85–24, 4–**118**, 1–**76**, 0–**101**, 79–0, 70–69, 0–**75**, 60–51, 73–10, 62–31, 128–6, 61–17, 82–49, 70–39, 41–**68**, 115–0, 19–**62**, 98–23, 0–**87**, 78–45, 0–**121**, 0–**77**, 68–17, 120–16, 28–**96**, 5–**120**
(Wales) **Mark Williams** wins the 2003 Embassy World Snooker Championship

== Century breaks ==
There were 53 century breaks made in the tournament. The highest break was a maximum break of 147 made by Ronnie O'Sullivan in the opening round.

- 147 – Ronnie O'Sullivan
- 140, 125, 102, 100 – Stephen Lee
- 135, 127, 109, 105, 100 – Peter Ebdon
- 135, 128, 128, 120, 110, 106, 101 – Paul Hunter
- 133, 114, 109 – Marco Fu
- 132, 130, 120, 115, 114, 111 – Stephen Hendry
- 131, 128, 115, 115, 112, 112, 111, 107 – Ken Doherty
- 131, 120, 118, 115, 102, 101 – Mark Williams
- 128 – Matthew Stevens
- 127, 122, 113, 103 – John Higgins
- 127 – Alan McManus
- 117 – Nigel Bond
- 113, 107 – Tony Drago
- 104 – Graeme Dott
- 101 – Ali Carter
- 101 – Shaun Murphy
- 100 – Ian McCulloch
