= Quinten Hann =

Australian pool and snooker player

Personal information
- Nickname: The Wizard of Oz
- Born: 4 June 1977 (age 49) Wagga Wagga, New South Wales, Australia

Sport
- Country: Australia
- Sport: Snooker
- Professional: 1995–2006
- Highest ranking: 14 (2002–2004)
- Best ranking finish: Semi-final (x1)

Quinten Hann (born 4 June 1977) is an Australian former professional pool and snooker player. He was the 1999 WEPF World Eight-ball Champion and the 1994 IBSF World Under-21 Snooker Champion. His highest snooker world ranking was 14, in the 2002-03 and 2003-04 seasons. In February 2006, he was banned from professional snooker for eight years for match-fixing at the 2005 China Open, shortly before which he resigned his membership of the World Professional Billiards and Snooker Association (WPBSA).

== Biography ==
=== Early life and amateur career ===
Born on 4 June 1977 in Wagga Wagga, New South Wales, Hann is the only child in a single-parent family. His father was absent from his life after his parents separated while the family was in Melbourne. He attended Redden Catholic College. When he turned nine, Hann's mother Amanda purchased a snooker table for him to practise the game. He later took up pool at the age of ten after being introduced to it through a friend in Brisbane. Hann played pool during the weekends, until his mother swayed him away from playing in public houses. She telephoned a snooker coach to teach her son the game.

In June 1989, at age 12, Hann became the youngest qualifier for the Australian men's open snooker championship, only losing in the last 16 stage to the Under-21 national champion Steve Mifsud. Although he broke his left wrist in a motorcycle accident which caused him to play in a plaster cast, he won the Victoria Under-12 Championship in March 1990. Three months later, Hann finished runner-up in his group at the 1990 IBSF World Under-21 Snooker Championship. But with six victories from eight matches, Hann did not qualify for the following rounds due to percentage. Hann's mother sold the family's home, car, and some other possessions to finance her son's career, and the family moved from Wagga Wagga to England in late 1989. She wrote to Matchroom Sport founder Barry Hearn, who offered his services to Hann.

At the age of 13, Hann compiled his first century break (a 103) in a match against Melbourne Senior Champion Garry Cullen. He later produced a break of 100 at the 1991 World Masters under-16 tournament, making him the youngest player to compile a televised century break. He reached the final of the Australian Amateur Championship at age 14 and he then took part in the IBSF World Snooker Championship. On 13 October 1991, Hann was given a suspended ban by the Australian Billiards and Snooker Council from all domestic and overseas competitions for spitting on a competitor's mother. This was invoked after the New South Wales country junior championship in January 1993 when he swore at the referee following a decision that favoured his opponent and entered the Lithgow Workmen's Club licensed poker-machine area. Hann's family appealed the ban to the High Court of Australia, and it was reduced to one year. In the meantime, he won the 1992 Australian Open 8-ball Championship, defeating Lou Condo 6–1 in the final and later beat David Gray 11–10 to win the 1994 IBSF World Under-21 Championship.

=== Professional career ===
Hann became a professional player in 1995. Within five months of the start of his first season, he reached No. 237 in the world by competing in satellite tournaments. Not discouraged by this, he met Brandon Parker through another player and Parker agreed to manage Hann's career. Hann was now able to enter tournaments abroad in the 1996–97 season, reaching the quarter-finals of the 1997 Thailand Open, and rising to No. 104 in the world. In 1996, he was paired with Robby Foldvari and Stan Gorski to represent Australia at the Snooker World Cup. The trio lasted until the quarter-finals, being defeated 5–10 by England.

For the 1997–98 season, Hann reached the televised stages of more tournaments, lasting until the second-rounds of the Grand Prix (where he set a record of 13 consecutive victories with a 5–4 margin and compiled the highest break of his career, a 141), the UK Championship, and the German Open tournaments. He lost in the first round of the preliminary stages of the British Open with a 5–0 whitewash to Drew Henry in April 1998. One month earlier, Hann became the first Australian player since Eddie Charlton in 1992 to qualify for the World Snooker Championship. He was eliminated by Mark Williams 9–10 in the first round, ending the season ranked No. 45 in the world.

Hann won the Lindrum Masters multi-format tournament in Newcastle, New South Wales in September 1998. After the tournament, he met with his mother and World Snooker chairman Rex Williams, and agreed to change his lifestyle and public image. Hann advanced to the quarter-finals of the Grand Prix tournament in the following month, losing to Stephen Lee in a 5–0 whitewash. He lost 5–9 to Marcus Campbell in the second round of the UK Championship in November; Hann's opponent criticised him for conceding two frames in the match. Hann replicated this performance once more during the season, this time in the Scottish Open in February 1999, losing 2–5 to Graeme Dott. He concluded the season ranked No. 26 in the world.

Before the start of the 1999–2000 snooker season, Hann won the WEPF World Eightball Championship to become the only player born outside the United Kingdom and Ireland to claim the title, and defeated Oliver Ortmann to successfully defend the Lindrum Masters tournament in August. He qualified for the British Open in September, lasting until the second round when he was defeated 2–5 by Stephen Lee. In October Hann withdrew from the Grand Prix as his father suffered a myocardial infarction, then withdrew from the Australian Nine-Ball Championship to pursue riding motorcycles as a hobby. While doing this, he sustained a clavicle fracture and a bruised wrist in an accident in Melbourne, which left him unable to play in the next six tournaments. Hann returned to competition at the Scottish Open in March 2000, reaching the second-round where he lost 4–5 to eventual champion Ronnie O'Sullivan.

Hann began the 2000–01 season ranked world No. 32. Hann prepared for the upcoming campaign by increasing his practise at his home in Melbourne. Before that Hann lasted until the semi-final stage of the WEPF World Eightball Championship in June 2000. Hann was eliminated from the second round at the Grand Prix tournament, and was booed by spectators for smashing the cue ball into the pack of reds in the final three frames of his match against O'Sullivan. He earned an official reprimand of £750 for "unprofessional behaviour" for nonperformance.

Hann broke a bone in his foot in a parachute jump before the 2000 UK Championship, and was required to play shoeless in a tournament, in which he lasted until the quarter-finals. He also reached the quarter-finals of the Thailand Masters before losing to John Parrott. Hann qualified for the 2001 World Snooker Championship and was drawn against world number 16 Dave Harold in the first round. The match saw Hann lose 5–10 to Harold.

He began the 2001/2002 season as the world number 25. Hann reached the second round of the season's first three ranking tournaments, before improving his performance to last until the third round of the China Open and the Thailand Masters. Later in 2002, he progressed beyond the third round of the Scottish Open ensuring that he would end the season as one of the world's top sixteen ranked players, making him the first Australian player to do so since Eddie Charlton in 1986. Hann ended the tournament in the quarter-final stage and critiqued the World Snooker Association's running of snooker. He concluded the season in the second round of the World Snooker Championship with a victory over Paul Hunter in the first round and a loss to Stephen Lee in the next stage. Players and pundits criticised Hann for breaking up the red balls in a pool-style method during both of his matches and for unprofessional-ism in the second game.

The 2002/2003 season saw Hann ranked 14th in the world. He was unable to win a match in the season's first four ranking tournaments. Hann's top sixteen world ranking allowed him to enter the non-ranking Masters tournament for the first time in his professional career, which he lost in the first round 4–6 to Lee. This marked a turning point in his season as he reached the second round of the next two competitions and the quarter-finals of the 2003 Irish Masters. At the World Snooker Championship, Hann defeated Parrott 10–5 in the first round, before he was defeated by Mark Williams 13–2 in the second round.

He retained his ranking of 14th in the world for the 2003/2004 season. Hann moved to Ealing after the 2003 World Championship and began practising regularly at Ealing Snooker Club in a bid to establish himself as one of the world's top 16 players. He got through to the quarter-finals of the UK Championship for the first time, where he played Ronnie O'Sullivan. He lost the match 3–9. At the 2004 Masters, Hann was defeated in the first round 3–6 by Peter Ebdon. He later progressed to the quarter-finals of the European Open in Malta and lost to local player Tony Drago 1–5. Hann progressed into the first ranking semi-final of his professional career at the Irish Masters. This made him the first Australian player to reach the semi-finals of a tournament since Warren King at the 1990 Classic. Hann conceded a frame while 30–24 ahead and executed a pool-style break off in his 5–6 defeat to Ebdon.

His final match of the season was a 4–10 defeat to Andy Hicks in the first round of the World Snooker Championship. After the match, referee Lawrie Annandale separated the two players from a physical altercation after Hann made a threatening comment to Hicks when Hicks suggested he would lose his top 16 world ranking. He challenged Hicks to a fight. In the event fellow snooker player Mark King stood in for Hicks at a charity boxing match with Hann which Hann won. Hann also fought Dublin GAA player, Johnny Magee, in a charity boxing match in Dublin in September 2004 after he suggested that Gaelic footballers were not as robust as Australian rules footballers. He had his nose broken, with Magee winning in three rounds.

Hann fell to 18th in the world rankings before the start of the 2004/2005 season. He reached the quarter finals of the 2004 World 8-Ball Championship and lost 6–9 to Darren Appleton. Hann withdrew from the 2005 Malta Cup due to a fractured finger. The 2005 World Championship saw Hann forced to play with a new cue after his original cue was lost after the China Open earlier that year. The original cue was eventually retrieved just before the World Championship but was damaged and unusable. He borrowed a friend's cue and decided against practising, and instead went out drinking. He played his first round match against Peter Ebdon hungover, and lost 2–10. Hann ended the season 22nd in the world rankings.

=== Match-fixing allegations and resignation ===
The day after his 2005 sex attack acquittal The Sun alleged that Hann agreed to lose his opening match against the 1997 world champion Ken Doherty at the China Open to one of its undercover reporters in return for £50,000. The story was held back to avoid prejudice in the outcome of Hann's trial. A hearing at the World Professional Billiards and Snooker Association (WPBSA) was convened after its panel was shown transcripts of video and audio footage of the meetings which took place between Hann and the undercover Sun journalists in March and April 2005. In September, he entered the Grand Prix tournament, before he withdrew one month later on medical grounds. Hann submitted a medical certificate and received a £3,000 prize fund from the WPBSA. Hann later failed to attend the first round of the UK Championship for undisclosed reasons.

On 14 February 2006 he resigned from the WPBSA. Hann did not attend the hearing and was found guilty in his absence. The newspaper did not go through with any agreement, but by agreeing to lose the game Hann was in breach of rule 2.8, which states "a member shall not directly or indirectly solicit, attempt to solicit or accept any payment or any form of remuneration of benefit in exchange for influencing the outcome of any game of snooker or billiards." Hann was banned from snooker until 2014 and also fined £10,000. He commented on the ban in 2010, "I was just the perfect scapegoat for them. I was a foreigner, I'd pretty much given up snooker and so I was fair game for them."

== Legal issues ==
Hann was accused of raping a woman in October 2001. Hann invited an unidentified South African born woman to a hotel in London after midnight. Both were drinking alcohol at a club bar in the West End and began kissing. The woman allowed Hann to remove her lower clothing. Hann's accuser alleged that he then forced himself upon her. Police later arrested Hann and charged him with rape. He was instructed to surrender his travel documents and a Magistrates' Court judge allowed him to keep playing professional snooker as long as he told the police where he was residing. Hann appeared in Southwark Crown Court on 3 January 2002 and entered a plea of not guilty. He was acquitted of the charges by a jury in July 2002.

Hann was cleared of further sex attacks on two women in 2005. The women accused Hann of behaving like a "crazed animal" and said that they thought they were going to die. One of them claimed that he repeatedly struck her, an accusation that Hann strongly denied explaining that his mother had taught him to never raise a hand to a woman. Ultimately the case turned on the credibility of his accuser, which was undermined when it was admitted she had lied consistently under oath throughout the trial.

In October 2014, it was reported that the Australian Securities and Investments Commission (ASIC) started court proceedings at the Federal Court of Australia against Hann (now going under the name Quinten Hunter), general manager of broker Monarch FX (Monarch FX Group Pty Ltd). ASIC temporarily banned Monarch FX and Hann from offering financial services until November 2014 when the hearing resumed. In 2016, Hann was banned from the financial services industry for four years.

== Performance and rankings timeline ==
| Tournament | 1995/ 96 | 1996/ 97 | 1997/ 98 | 1998/ 99 | 1999/ 00 | 2000/ 01 | 2001/ 02 | 2002/ 03 | 2003/ 04 | 2004/ 05 | 2005/ 06 |
|---|---|---|---|---|---|---|---|---|---|---|---|
| Ranking (Note: From the 2010/2011 season it shows the ranking at the beginning of the season.) | (Note: New players on the Main Tour don't have a ranking.) | 237 | 104 | 45 | 26 | 32 | 25 | 14 | 14 | 18 | 22 |
Ranking tournaments
| Grand Prix (Note: The event also ran under the name LG Cup (2001/2002–2003/2004)) | 1R | LQ | 2R | QF | WD | 2R | 2R | 2R | 2R | 1R | WD |
| UK Championship | LQ | 1R | 2R | 2R | WD | QF | 1R | 2R | QF | 2R | WD |
| Malta Cup (Note: The event also ran as the European Open (1995/1996–1996/1997 and 2001/2002–2003/2004) and Irish Open (1998/1999)) | LQ | LQ | NH | 1R | Not Held | | 1R | 2R | QF | WD | A |
| Welsh Open | LQ | LQ | LQ | LQ | WD | 2R | LQ | 1R | 2R | 2R | WD |
| China Open (Note: The event ran under a different name as China International (1997/1998–1998/1999)) | Not Held | | NR | 1R | LQ | LQ | 2R | Not Held | | 1R | WD |
| World Championship | WD | LQ | 1R | LQ | LQ | 1R | 2R | 2R | 1R | 1R | A |
Non-ranking tournaments
| The Masters | LQ | LQ | LQ | A | A | A | A | 1R | 1R | A | A |
Former ranking tournaments
| Asian Classic (Note: The event also ran under the name Thailand Classic (1995/1996)) | LQ | LQ | Tournament Not Held | | | | | | | | |
| German Open | LQ | LQ | 2R | NR | Tournament Not Held | | | | | | |
| Thailand Masters (Note: The event also ran under the name Thailand Open (1995/1996–1996/1997)) | LQ | QF | LQ | 1R | WD | QF | 2R | NR | Not Held | | |
| Scottish Open (Note: The event also ran under the names International Open (1995/1996–1996/1997) and Players Championship (2003/2004)) | LQ | LQ | LQ | 2R | 2R | 1R | QF | 3R | 2R | Not Held | |
| Irish Masters | Non-Ranking Event | | | | | | | QF | SF | LQ | NH |
| British Open | LQ | LQ | LQ | 1R | 2R | 2R | 2R | 2R | 3R | 2R | NH |

| NH / Not Held | event was not held. |
| NR / Non-Ranking Event | event is/was no longer a ranking event. |
| R / Ranking Event | event is/was a ranking event. |
| MR / Minor-Ranking Event | event is/was a minor-ranking event. |

== Career finals ==
=== Amateur finals: 3 (1 title) ===
| Outcome | No. | Year | Championship | Opponent in the final | Score |
|---|---|---|---|---|---|
| Runner-up | 1. | 1991 | Australian Amateur Championship | David Collins (AUS) | 4–5 |
| Winner | 1. | 1994 | IBSF World Under-21 Championship | David Gray (ENG) | 11–10 |
| Runner-up | 2. | 2002 | Australian Amateur Championship (2) | Steve Mifsud (AUS) | 3–6 |
