= 2001 Thailand Masters =

Thailand Masters
Tournament information
- Dates: 11–17 March 2001
- Venue: Merchant Court Hotel
- City: Bangkok
- Country: Thailand
- Organisation: WPBSA
- Format: Ranking event
- Total prize fund: £282,000
- Winner's share: £44,000
- Highest break: Ken Doherty (IRL) (132)

Final
- Champion: Ken Doherty (IRL)
- Runner-up: Stephen Hendry (SCO)
- Score: 9–3

The 2001 Blue Eagle/Thai Airways Thailand Masters was a professional ranking snooker tournament that took place between 11 and 17 March 2001 at the Merchant Court Hotel in Bangkok, Thailand.

Ken Doherty won in the final 9–3 against Stephen Hendry. The defending champion, Mark Williams, was defeated by John Parrott in the last 16.

== Main draw ==
Last 32; Best of 9 frames
(Wales) Mark Williams	5
(England) Michael Holt	1
(England) John Parrott	5
(England) Joe Perry	2
(England) Paul Hunter	1
(Australia) Quinten Hann	5
(England) Stephen Lee	5
(England) Mike Dunn	1
(Republic of Ireland) Ken Doherty	5
(England) Jimmy White	1
(Republic of Ireland) Fergal O'Brien	5
(England) Nigel Bond	3
(Hong Kong) Marco Fu	2
(Pakistan) Shokat Ali	5
(England) Ronnie O'Sullivan	5
(Scotland) Chris Small	1
(Scotland) Stephen Hendry	5
(Wales) Anthony Davies	4
(England) Dave Harold	3
(Republic of Ireland) Michael Judge	5
(England) Peter Ebdon	1
(England) Adrian Gunnell	5
(Wales) Matthew Stevens	5
(Northern Ireland) Patrick Wallace	4
(Scotland) Alan McManus	3
(England) Dave Finbow	5
(England) Anthony Hamilton	5
(Wales) Darren Morgan	1
(Northern Ireland) Joe Swail	5
(England) Alfie Burden	4
(Scotland) John Higgins	5
(England) Antony Bolsover	1

Last 16; Best of 9 frames
(Wales) Mark Williams	4
(England) John Parrott	5
(Australia) Quinten Hann	5
(England) Stephen Lee	4
(Republic of Ireland) Ken Doherty	5
(Republic of Ireland) Fergal O'Brien	2
(Pakistan) Shokat Ali	5
(England) Ronnie O'Sullivan	4
(Scotland) Stephen Hendry	5
(Republic of Ireland) Michael Judge	4
(England) Adrian Gunnell	3
(Wales) Matthew Stevens	5
(England) Dave Finbow	5
(England) Anthony Hamilton	1
(Northern Ireland) Joe Swail	1
(Scotland) John Higgins	5

Quarter-finals; Best of 9 frames
(England) John Parrott	5
(Australia) Quinten Hann	3
(Republic of Ireland) Ken Doherty	5
(Pakistan) Shokat Ali	1
(Scotland) Stephen Hendry	5
(Wales) Matthew Stevens	3
(England) Dave Finbow	3
(Scotland) John Higgins	5

Semi-finals; Best of 9 frames
(England) John Parrott	1
(Republic of Ireland) Ken Doherty	5
(Scotland) Stephen Hendry	5
(Scotland) John Higgins	1

Final; Best of 17 frames
(Republic of Ireland) Ken Doherty	9
(Scotland) Stephen Hendry	3

== Final ==
Final: Best of 17 frames. Merchant Court Hotel, Bangkok, Thailand. 17 March 2001.
Ken Doherty; Ireland	9–3	Stephen Hendry; Scotland
Afternoon: 58–7, 41–66 (57), 50–66 (59), 105–0 (105), 85–0 (85), 132–0 (132), 72–15 (72), 0–71 (71); Evening: 71–63 (71, 55), 108–5 (51), 91–27 (91), 91–27
132	Highest break	71
2	Century breaks	0
7	50+ breaks	4
