= 2002–03 snooker season =

Details
- Duration: 27 August 2002 – 22 May 2003
- Tournaments: 19 (8 ranking events)

Triple Crown winners
- UK Championship: (Wales) Mark Williams
- Masters: (Wales) Mark Williams
- World Championship: (Wales) Mark Williams

The 2002–03 snooker season was a series of snooker tournaments played between 27 August 2002 and 22 May 2003. Due to a legal ban, this was the final season to have events sponsored by tobacco companies (apart from Embassy, who would continue to sponsor the World Championship for another two years). The following table outlines the results for the ranking events and the invitational events. Mark Williams won all three triple crown events (UK Championship, Masters, World Championship) - the last player to do so in a single season.

== Calendar ==
=== World Snooker Tour ===
Start	Finish	Country	Tournament name	Venue	City	Winner	Runner-up	Score	Ref.
24 Sep	29 Sep	SCO	Scottish Masters	Thistle Hotels	Glasgow	(England) Ronnie O'Sullivan	(Scotland) John Higgins	9–4	
5 Oct	13 Oct	ENG	LG Cup	Guild Hall	Preston	(Scotland) Chris Small	(Scotland) Alan McManus	9–5	
21 Oct	31 Oct	ENG	Benson & Hedges Championship	Towers Snooker Club	Mansfield	(England) Mark Davis	(Cyprus) Mehmet Husnu	9–6	
9 Nov	17 Nov	ENG	British Open	Telford International Centre	Telford	(England) Paul Hunter	(England) Ian McCulloch	9–4	
2 Dec	15 Dec	ENG	UK Championship	Barbican Centre	York	(Wales) Mark Williams	(Republic of Ireland) Ken Doherty	10–9	
22 Jan	26 Jan	WAL	Welsh Open	Cardiff International Arena	Cardiff	(Scotland) Stephen Hendry	(Wales) Mark Williams	9–5	
2 Feb	9 Feb	ENG	Masters	Wembley Conference Centre	London	(Wales) Mark Williams	(Scotland) Stephen Hendry	10–4	
11 Mar	16 Mar	ENG	European Open	Palace Hotel	Torquay	(England) Ronnie O'Sullivan	(Scotland) Stephen Hendry	9–6	
25 Mar	30 Mar	IRL	Irish Masters	Citywest Hotel	Dublin	(England) Ronnie O'Sullivan	(Scotland) John Higgins	10–9	
5 Apr	13 Apr	SCO	Scottish Open	Royal Highland Centre	Edinburgh	(England) David Gray	(England) Mark Selby	9–7	
19 Apr	5 May	ENG	World Snooker Championship	Crucible Theatre	Sheffield	(Wales) Mark Williams	(Republic of Ireland) Ken Doherty	18–16	
11 Jan	11 May	ENG	Premier League	Crowtree Leisure Centre	Sunderland	(Hong Kong) Marco Fu	(Wales) Mark Williams	9–5	

Ranking event
Non-ranking event

=== Challenge Tour ===
Start	Finish	Country	Tournament name	Venue	City	Winner	Runner-up	Score	Ref.
2 Nov	7 Nov	WAL	Challenge Tour 1	Towers Snooker Club	Mansfield	(England) Chris Melling	(England) Tom Ford	6–2	
15 Feb	20 Feb	ENG	Challenge Tour 2	Jesters Snooker Club	Swindon	(England) Adrian Rosa	(England) Stuart Mann	6–5	
15 Mar	20 Mar	WAL	Challenge Tour 3	Jesters Snooker Club	Swindon	(England) Michael Rhodes	(England) Luke Simmonds	6–5	
16 May	22 May	WAL	Challenge Tour 4	Pontin's	Prestatyn	(Norway) Kurt Maflin	(England) James Leadbetter	6–2	

=== Other events ===
Start	Finish	Country	Tournament name	Venue	City	Winner	Runner-up	Score	Ref.
1 Oct	8 Oct	KOR	Asian Games	Dongju College Gymnasium	Busan	(China) Ding Junhui	(Thailand) Supoj Saenla	3–1	
20 Feb	22 Feb	NIR	Irish Open	Millennium Forum	Derry	(Northern Ireland) Joe Swail	(Republic of Ireland) Fergal O'Brien	10–3	
19 Feb	23 Feb	THA	Thailand Masters	Rajamangala National Stadium	Bangkok	(Thailand) Noppadon Noppachorn	(Thailand) Rom Surin	5–4	

== Official rankings ==
The top 16 of the world rankings, these players automatically played in the final rounds of the world ranking events and were invited for the Masters.

No.	Player	Points 2000/01	Points 2001/02	Total
1	(England) Ronnie O'Sullivan	25399	24625	50024
2	(Wales) Mark Williams	21735	25050	46785
3	(England) Peter Ebdon	20777	23875	44652
4	(Scotland) John Higgins	22034	22300	44334
5	(Republic of Ireland) Ken Doherty	22079	21400	43479
6	(Scotland) Stephen Hendry	17478	24650	42128
7	(England) Stephen Lee	13944	25725	39669
8	(Wales) Matthew Stevens	14879	18000	32879
9	(England) Paul Hunter	15809	15500	31309
10	(England) Jimmy White	12009	16925	28934
11	(England) Mark King	11895	15537	27432
12	(Scotland) Graeme Dott	11397	15762	27159
13	(England) Joe Perry	9269	17700	26969
14	(Australia) Quinten Hann	11395	14837	26232
15	(Scotland) Alan McManus	12190	13550	25740
16	(Northern Ireland) Joe Swail	12117	12762	24879
