= 2002–03 snooker world rankings =

No. 1: Ronnie O'Sullivan
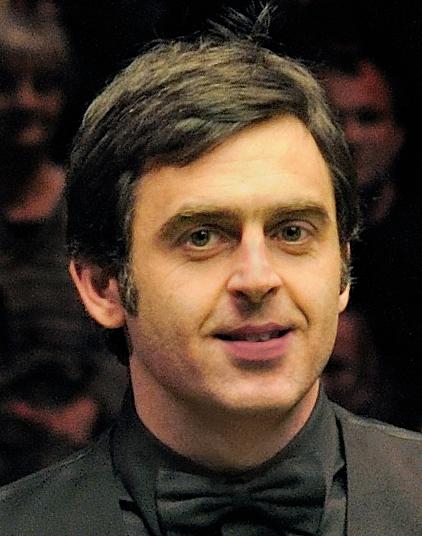

Personal information
- Born: December 5, 1975 (age 50)

Sport
- Country: England
- Sport: Snooker
- Professional: 1992–present
- Highest ranking: 1

Preceded by 2001–02	2002–03	Succeeded by 2003–04

2002–03 snooker world rankings: The professional world rankings for the top 64 snooker players in the 2002‍–‍03 season are listed below.

No. 2: Mark Williams
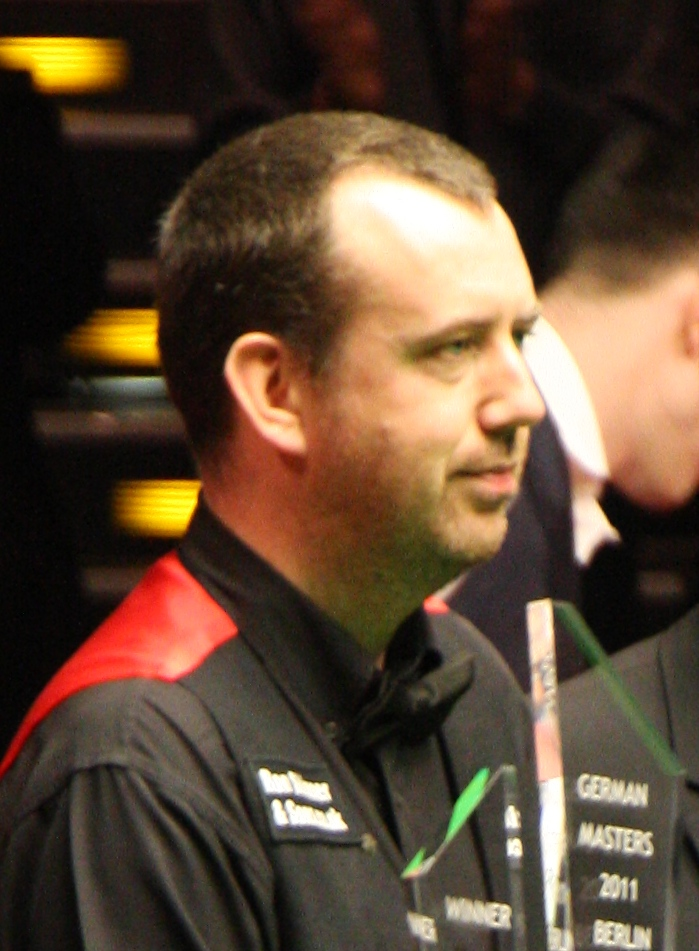

Personal information
- Born: March 21, 1975 (age 51)

Sport
- Country: Wales
- Sport: Snooker
- Professional: 1992–present
- Highest ranking: 1

No. 3: Peter Ebdon
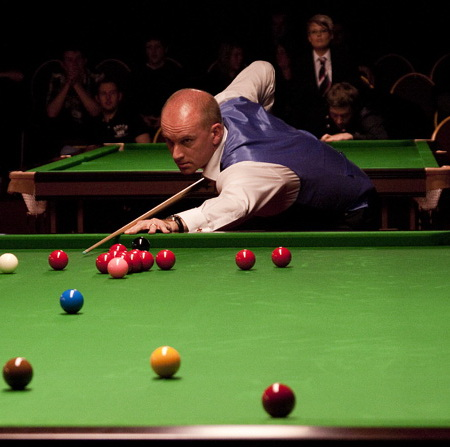

Personal information
- Born: August 27, 1970 (age 56)

Sport
- Country: England
- Sport: Snooker
- Professional: 1991–2020
- Highest ranking: 3

No.	Name	Nationality	Points
1	Ronnie O'Sullivan	England	50024
2	Mark Williams	Wales	46785
3	Peter Ebdon	England	44652
4	John Higgins	Scotland	44334
5	Ken Doherty	Ireland	43479
6	Stephen Hendry	Scotland	42128
7	Stephen Lee	England	39669
8	Matthew Stevens	Wales	32879
9	Paul Hunter	England	31309
10	Jimmy White	England	28934
11	Mark King	England	27432
12	Graeme Dott	Scotland	27159
13	Joe Perry	England	26969
14	Quinten Hann	Australia	26232
15	Alan McManus	Scotland	25740
16	Joe Swail	Northern Ireland	24879
17	Anthony Hamilton	England	23836
18	John Parrott	England	23488
19	David Gray	England	22868
20	Dominic Dale	Wales	22674
21	Dave Harold	England	22615
22	Drew Henry	Scotland	22541
23	Fergal O'Brien	Ireland	22408
24	Michael Judge	Ireland	22018
25	Steve Davis	England	21775
26	Anthony Davies	Wales	21053
27	Marco Fu	Hong Kong	20293
28	Tony Drago	Malta	19779
29	Chris Small	Scotland	19423
30	Nigel Bond	England	19038
31	Ali Carter	England	18539
32	James Wattana	Thailand	18371
33	Robert Milkins	England	18073
34	Shokat Ali	Pakistan	17921
35	Michael Holt	England	17519
36	Patrick Wallace	Northern Ireland	17404
37	Mark Davis	England	16910
38	Alfie Burden	England	16698
39	Robin Hull	Finland	16528
40	Billy Snaddon	Scotland	16403
41	Marcus Campbell	Scotland	16062
42	Brian Morgan	England	16033
43	Ian McCulloch	England	15958
44	Jamie Burnett	Scotland	15230
45	Terry Murphy	Northern Ireland	15083
46	Gary Wilkinson	England	15076
47	Jonathan Birch	England	15014
48	David Roe	England	14898
49	Dave Finbow	England	14765
50	Bradley Jones	England	14699
51	Barry Hawkins	England	14649
52	Stephen Maguire	Scotland	14419
53	Mark Selby	England	14395
54	Darren Morgan	Wales	14377
55	Jimmy Michie	England	14286
56	Barry Pinches	England	13846
57	Stuart Bingham	England	13735
58	Stuart Pettman	England	13715
59	Bjorn Haneveer	Belgium	13566
60	Mike Dunn	England	13342
61	Andy Hicks	England	13231
62	Nick Dyson	England	13063
63	Gerard Greene	Northern Ireland	12815
64	Lee Walker	Wales	11958
