= 2003 Masters (snooker) =

Professional non-ranking snooker tournament, Feb 2003

2003 Benson & Hedges Masters
Tournament information
- Dates: 2–9 February 2003
- Venue: Wembley Conference Centre
- City: London
- Country: England
- Organisation: WPBSA
- Format: Non-ranking event
- Total prize fund: £695,000
- Winner's share: £210,000
- Highest break: Stephen Hendry (SCO) (144)

Final
- Champion: Mark Williams (WAL)
- Runner-up: Stephen Hendry (SCO)
- Score: 10–4

The 2003 Masters (officially the 2003 Benson & Hedges Masters) was a professional non-ranking snooker tournament that took place between 2 and 9 February 2003 at the Wembley Conference Centre in London, England.

Paul Hunter, who was aiming to complete a hat-trick of Masters titles, lost 3–6 to Mark Williams in the semi-final. Williams then beat Stephen Hendry 10–4 in the final to win his second Masters title. Hendry made the highest break of the championship with a 144 in his semi-final match against Ken Doherty, but missed out on a 147 during his quarter-final match against local favourite Jimmy White when he failed to pot the final pink.

This was the last Masters to be sponsored by Benson & Hedges after the ban on tobacco advertising which came into effect in summer 2003. Regal's sponsorship of the Scottish Masters, the Welsh Open and the Scottish Open also ended during the 2002/2003 season. However, Embassy continued to sponsor the World Championship until 2005.

A total attendance of 24,329 was the events highest since 1988.

== Field ==
Defending champion Paul Hunter was the number 1 seed with World Champion Peter Ebdon seeded 2. Places were allocated to the top 16 players in the world rankings. Players seeded 15 and 16 played in the wild-card round against the winner of the qualifying event, Mark Davis (ranked 37), and Steve Davis (ranked 25), who was the wild-card selection. Mark Davis, Quinten Hann and Joe Perry were making their debuts in the Masters.

== Prize fund ==
The breakdown of prize money for this year is shown below:

- Winner: £210,000
- Runner-up: £105,000
- Highest break: £22,000
- Maximum break: £100,000
- Total: £695,000

== Wild-card round ==
Match	Date		Score	
WC1	Sunday 2 February	Alan McManus (SCO) (15)	6–5	Mark Davis (ENG)
WC2	Monday 3 February	Joe Swail (NIR) (16)	4–6	Steve Davis (ENG)

== Main draw ==
Last 16; Best of 11 frames
1	(England) Paul Hunter	6
15	(Scotland) Alan McManus	4
8	(England) Stephen Lee	6
14	(Australia) Quinten Hann	4
5	(Scotland) John Higgins	6
(England) Steve Davis	2
4	(Wales) Mark Williams	6
12	(Scotland) Graeme Dott	3
3	(England) Ronnie O'Sullivan	6
13	(England) Joe Perry	1
6	(Republic of Ireland) Ken Doherty	6
9	(Wales) Matthew Stevens	5
7	(Scotland) Stephen Hendry	6
11	(England) Mark King	3
2	(England) Peter Ebdon	5
10	(England) Jimmy White	6

Quarter-finals; Best of 11 frames
1	(England) Paul Hunter	6
8	(England) Stephen Lee	1
5	(Scotland) John Higgins	3
4	(Wales) Mark Williams	6
3	(England) Ronnie O'Sullivan	5
6	(Republic of Ireland) Ken Doherty	6
7	(Scotland) Stephen Hendry	6
10	(England) Jimmy White	4

Semi-finals; Best of 11 frames
1	(England) Paul Hunter	3
4	(Wales) Mark Williams	6
6	(Republic of Ireland) Ken Doherty	3
7	(Scotland) Stephen Hendry	6

Final; Best of 19 frames
4	(Wales) Mark Williams	10
7	(Scotland) Stephen Hendry	4

== Final ==
Final: Best of 19 frames. Referee: Alan Chamberlain; Wembley Conference Centre, London, England, 9 February 2003.
Mark Williams (4); Wales	10–4	Stephen Hendry (7); Scotland
Afternoon: 69–5, 0–123 (70), 82–1 (82), 76–1, 67–47, 74–35 (59), 67–43, 0–102 (102); Evening: 59–12, 27–101 (101), 50–67, 68–36, 61–1 (60), 83–0 (82)
82	Highest break	102
0	Century breaks	2
4	50+ breaks	3

== Qualifying ==
The 2002 Masters Qualifying Event was held between 21 and 31 October 2002 at Pontin's in Prestatyn, Wales. The winner of this series of matches, who qualified for the tournament, was Mark Davis. Tony Drago made his first and to date only maximum break against Stuart Bingham.

== Century breaks ==
Total: 25

- 144, 134, 107, 106, 102, 101, 101 – Stephen Hendry
- 138, 104 – Paul Hunter
- 122 – Quinten Hann
- 121, 115, 103, 102, 100 – Mark Williams
- 117, 101 – John Higgins
- 112, 105 – Ronnie O'Sullivan
- 111 – Jimmy White
- 107, 104 – Mark Davis
- 104 – Steve Davis
- 104 – Matthew Stevens
- 100 – Ken Doherty
