= 2000 British Open =

Tournament information
- Dates: 1–8 October 2000
- Venue: Plymouth Pavilions
- City: Plymouth
- Country: England
- Organisation: WPBSA
- Format: Ranking event
- Total prize fund: £440,000
- Winner's share: £62,000

Final
- Champion: Peter Ebdon (ENG)
- Runner-up: Jimmy White (ENG)
- Score: 9–6

The 2000 British Open was a professional ranking snooker tournament, that was held from 1–8 October 2000 at the Plymouth Pavilions, Plymouth, England.

Peter Ebdon won the tournament by defeating Jimmy White nine frames to six in the final. The defending champion, Stephen Hendry, was defeated by Alan McManus in the quarter-final.

== Prize fund ==
The breakdown of prize money for the championship is shown below:

- Winner: £62,000
- Runner-up: £33,000
- Semi-finalists: £16,500
- Quarter-finalists: £9,400
- Last 16: £4,800
- Last 32: £3,900
- Last 48: £3,150
- Last 64: £2,400
- Last 96: £1,550
- Last 128: £950
- Highest break (televised stage): £5,000
- Highest break (untelevised stage): £1,000
- Total: £440,000

== Main draw ==
Last 48; Best of 9 frames
30	(Northern Ireland) Terry Murphy	5
(England) Stuart Bingham	3
28	(England) Brian Morgan	0
(England) Robert Milkins	5
17	(England) Steve Davis	5
(Iceland) Kristján Helgason	4
26	(Malta) Tony Drago	5
(Scotland) John Lardner	4
20	(Wales) Dominic Dale	5
(England) Gary Wilkinson	3
19	(Scotland) Graeme Dott	5
(England) Jonathan Birch	1
29	(Scotland) Drew Henry	4
(Pakistan) Shokat Ali	5
32	(Australia) Quinten Hann	5
(England) Michael Holt	2
25	(Wales) Darren Morgan	3
(Wales) Anthony Davies	5
24	(Scotland) Billy Snaddon	5
(Wales) Lee Walker	2
21	(Scotland) Chris Small	3
(England) Gary Ponting	5
23	(England) Nigel Bond	0
(England) David Gray	5
18	(England) Jimmy White	5
(England) Peter Lines	3
31	(England) Joe Perry	5
(England) Troy Shaw	0
22	(England) Mark King	5
(England) Steve James	0
27	(Thailand) James Wattana	5
(England) Andrew Higginson	4

Last 32; Best of 9 frames
1	(Scotland) Stephen Hendry	5
30	(Northern Ireland) Terry Murphy	2
16	(Northern Ireland) Joe Swail	2
(England) Robert Milkins	5
9	(Republic of Ireland) Fergal O'Brien	3
17	(England) Steve Davis	5
8	(Scotland) Alan McManus	5
26	(Malta) Tony Drago	4
5	(England) Stephen Lee	5
20	(Wales) Dominic Dale	3
12	(England) Peter Ebdon	5
19	(Scotland) Graeme Dott	1
13	(England) Dave Harold	5
(Pakistan) Shokat Ali	4
4	(England) Ronnie O'Sullivan	5
32	(Australia) Quinten Hann	3
3	(Scotland) John Higgins	5
(Wales) Anthony Davies	1
14	(England) Paul Hunter	5
24	(Scotland) Billy Snaddon	4
11	(England) Anthony Hamilton	w/d
(England) Gary Ponting	w/o
6	(Wales) Matthew Stevens	5
(England) David Gray	2
7	(Republic of Ireland) Ken Doherty	2
18	(England) Jimmy White	5
10	(England) John Parrott	2
31	(England) Joe Perry	5
15	(Hong Kong) Marco Fu	4
22	(England) Mark King	5
2	(Wales) Mark Williams	5
27	(Thailand) James Wattana	4

Last 16; Best of 9 frames
1	(Scotland) Stephen Hendry	5
(England) Robert Milkins	3
17	(England) Steve Davis	3
8	(Scotland) Alan McManus	5
5	(England) Stephen Lee	2
12	(England) Peter Ebdon	5
13	(England) Dave Harold	3
4	(England) Ronnie O'Sullivan	5
3	(Scotland) John Higgins	4
14	(England) Paul Hunter	5
(England) Gary Ponting	5
6	(Wales) Matthew Stevens	4
18	(England) Jimmy White	5
31	(England) Joe Perry	2
22	(England) Mark King	5
2	(Wales) Mark Williams	3

Quarter-finals; Best of 9 frames
1	(Scotland) Stephen Hendry	2
8	(Scotland) Alan McManus	5
12	(England) Peter Ebdon	5
4	(England) Ronnie O'Sullivan	3
14	(England) Paul Hunter	5
(England) Gary Ponting	4
18	(England) Jimmy White	5
22	(England) Mark King	4

Semi-finals; Best of 11 frames
8	(Scotland) Alan McManus	2
12	(England) Peter Ebdon	6
14	(England) Paul Hunter	2
18	(England) Jimmy White	6

Final; Best of 17 frames
12	(England) Peter Ebdon	9
18	(England) Jimmy White	6

== Final ==
Final: Best of 17 frames. Referee: Alan Chamberlain; Plymouth Pavilions, Plymouth, England. 8 October 2000.
Peter Ebdon; England	9–6	Jimmy White; England
Afternoon: 35–70 (59), 8–88, 93–7, 69–15, 37–69 (57), 64–0 (57), 15–67 (54), 94–0 (53); Evening: 34–59, 121–0 (80), 68–58 (63), 107–8 (50, 57), 7–76, 120–4 (120), 83–43
120	Highest break	59
1	Century breaks	0
7	50+ breaks	3
