= Philip Williams (snooker player) =

Welsh snooker player

Personal information
- Born: 3 June 1967 (age 59) Llanelli

Sport
- Country: Wales
- Sport: Snooker
- Professional: 1993–1997, 1998–2002, 2003–2004
- Highest ranking: 99 (2003/2004)

Philip Williams (born 3 June 1967) is a Welsh former professional snooker player. He was a professional for most seasons between 1993–94 and 2003–04, but failed to establish himself, his highest ranking position being 99. His best performances both came in 2001, when he reached the last 64 of both the Benson & Hedges Championship and the British Open.

As an amateur, he won the Welsh Championship in 2006. He then reached the quarter-final at the amateur 2006 IBSF World Snooker Championship in Amman, Jordan, where he was eliminated by Kurt Maflin 6–3. In the 2008 IBSF World Snooker Championship he was beaten by Alok Kumar. In the 2009 IBSF World Snooker Championship he was eliminated in the semi-finals by Alfie Burden of England. In 2010 he won the IBSF World Masters Championship in Damascus, Syria, beating Thailand's Chuchart Trairattanapradit 6 – 4.

In 2013 he was a surprise qualifier for the Last 16 of the WPBSA World Seniors Championship – his qualifying tournament wins included defeats of 2 former top 16 players, Gary Wilkinson and Patsy Fagan. He qualified again in 2021, losing to eventual winner David Lilley in the last 16.

He reached the last 16 of the World Seniors Championship once more in 2023 after winning the Golden Ticket tournament, beating Craig Steadman in the final. He will play Jimmy White at the Crucible.

== Non-ranking finals:1 (1 title) ==
- 2023 Seniors Golden Ticket Tournament
