= 2003–04 snooker world rankings =

No. 1: Mark Williams
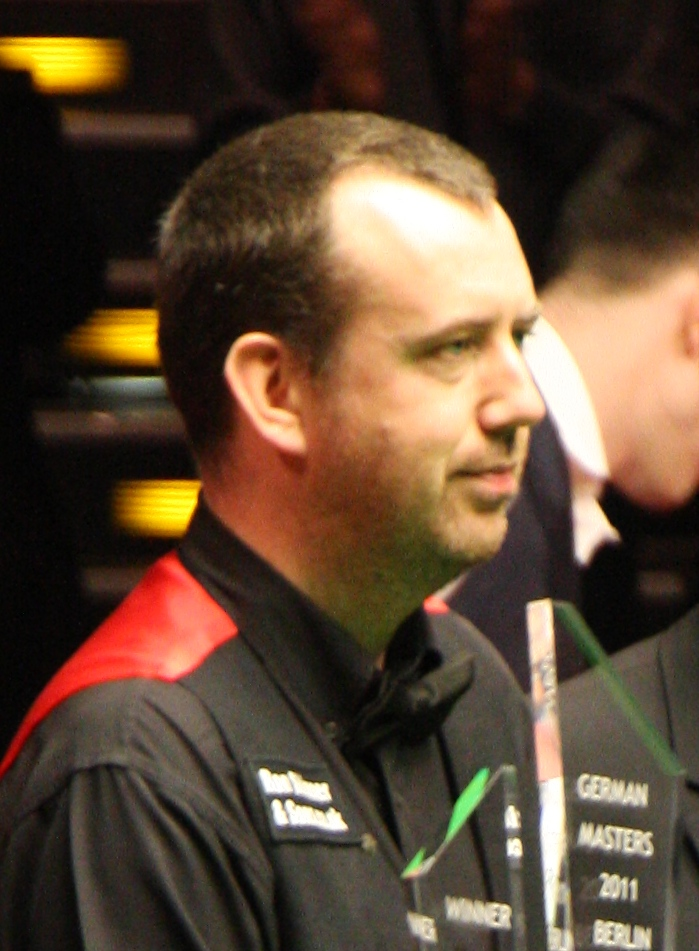

Personal information
- Born: March 21, 1975 (age 51)

Sport
- Country: Wales
- Sport: Snooker
- Professional: 1992–present
- Highest ranking: 1

| Preceded by 2002–03 | 2003–04 | Succeeded by 2004–05 |

2003–04 snooker world rankings: The professional world rankings for the top 64 snooker players in the 2003‍–‍04 season are listed below.

No. 2: Stephen Hendry
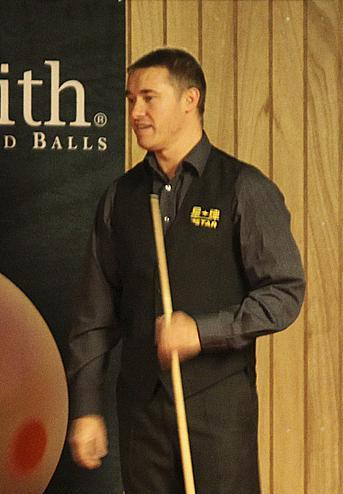

Personal information
- Born: January 13, 1969 (age 57)

Sport
- Country: Scotland
- Sport: Snooker
- Professional: 1985–2012, 2020–2024
- Highest ranking: 1

No. 3: Ronnie O'Sullivan
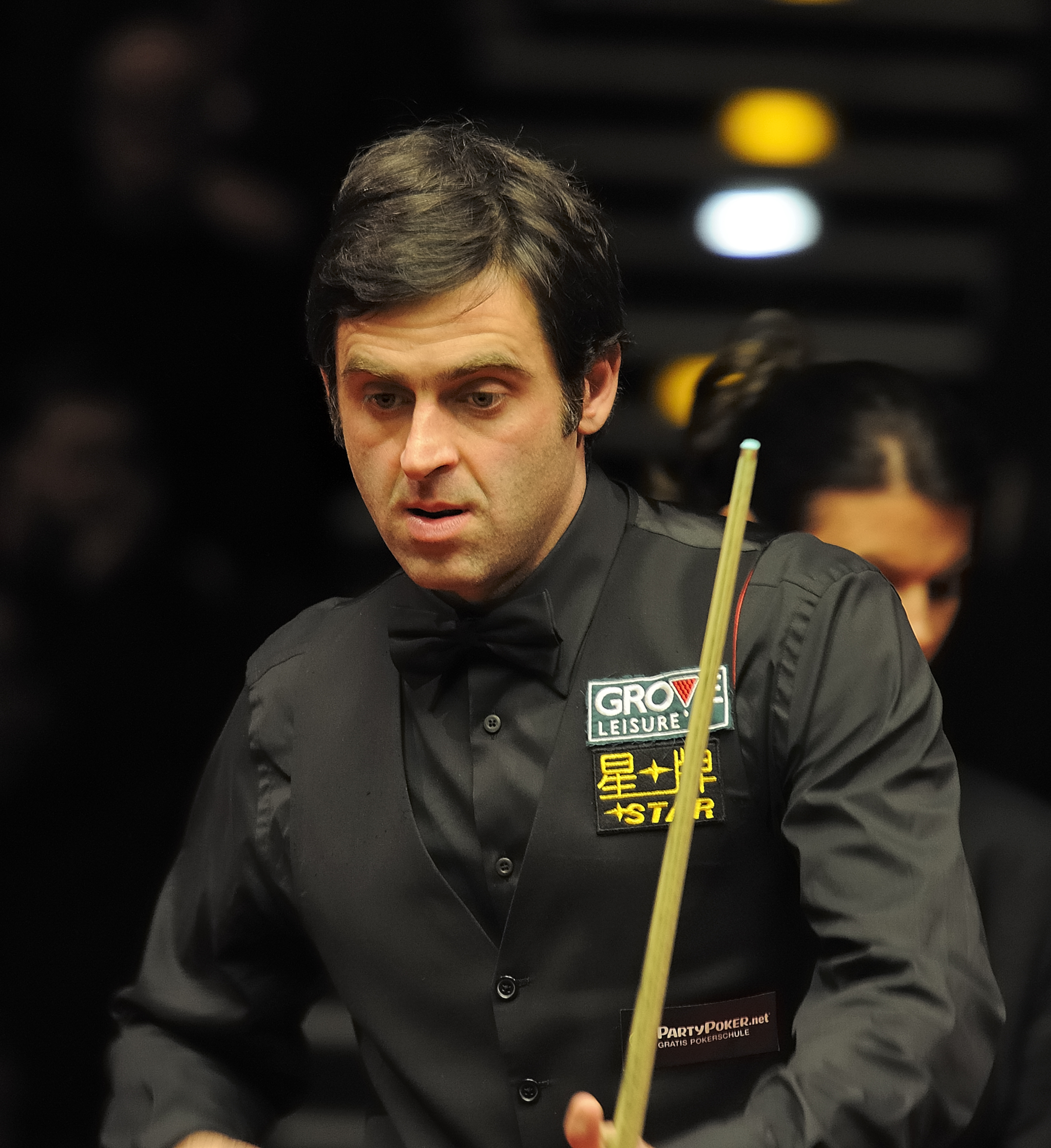

Personal information
- Born: December 5, 1975 (age 50)

Sport
- Country: England
- Sport: Snooker
- Professional: 1992–present
- Highest ranking: 1

| No. | Name | Nationality | Points |
|---|---|---|---|
| 1 | Mark Williams | Wales | 52600 |
| 2 | Stephen Hendry | Scotland | 44800 |
| 3 | Ronnie O'Sullivan | England | 44750 |
| 4 | John Higgins | Scotland | 42575 |
| 5 | Stephen Lee | England | 42400 |
| 6 | Ken Doherty | Ireland | 40375 |
| 7 | Peter Ebdon | England | 39900 |
| 8 | Paul Hunter | England | 36950 |
| 9 | Matthew Stevens | Wales | 32875 |
| 10 | Alan McManus | Scotland | 29975 |
| 11 | Steve Davis | England | 28775 |
| 12 | David Gray | England | 28012 |
| 13 | Graeme Dott | Scotland | 27262 |
| 14 | Quinten Hann | Australia | 27149 |
| 15 | Jimmy White | England | 26887 |
| 16 | Joe Perry | England | 26637 |
| 17 | Ali Carter | England | 26575 |
| 18 | Chris Small | Scotland | 25475 |
| 19 | Marco Fu | Hong Kong | 25300 |
| 20 | Anthony Hamilton | England | 24662 |
| 21 | Robert Milkins | England | 25075 |
| 22 | Mark King | England | 24774 |
| 23 | Dave Harold | England | 24662 |
| 24 | Tony Drago | Malta | 24225 |
| 25 | Drew Henry | Scotland | 23600 |
| 26 | Ian McCulloch | England | 23400 |
| 27 | Joe Swail | Northern Ireland | 23024 |
| 28 | Dominic Dale | Wales | 22750 |
| 29 | Mark Selby | England | 22000 |
| 30 | John Parrott | England | 21862 |
| 31 | Anthony Davies | Wales | 21579 |
| 32 | Robin Hull | Finland | 20500 |
| 33 | Fergal O'Brien | Ireland | 20124 |
| 34 | James Wattana | Thailand | 19674 |
| 35 | Mark Davis | England | 19050 |
| 36 | Barry Pinches | England | 18675 |
| 37 | Michael Judge | Ireland | 18662 |
| 38 | Gerard Greene | Northern Ireland | 18662 |
| 39 | Michael Holt | England | 18450 |
| 40 | Nigel Bond | England | 17524 |
| 41 | Stephen Maguire | Scotland | 17475 |
| 42 | Barry Hawkins | England | 17375 |
| 43 | Stuart Bingham | England | 16925 |
| 44 | Gary Wilkinson | England | 16850 |
| 45 | Brian Morgan | England | 16700 |
| 46 | Jamie Burnett | Scotland | 16350 |
| 47 | Stuart Pettman | England | 16212 |
| 48 | Jonathan Birch | England | 16150 |
| 49 | Shokat Ali | Pakistan | 11817 |
| 50 | Patrick Wallace | Northern Ireland | 15500 |
| 51 | Sean Storey | England | 15400 |
| 52 | David Finbow | England | 15387 |
| 53 | Rod Lawler | England | 15137 |
| 54 | Nick Walker | England | 15125 |
| 55 | Nick Dyson | England | 15050 |
| 56 | Marcus Campbell | Scotland | 14900 |
| 57 | David Roe | England | 14800 |
| 58 | Mike Dunn | England | 14512 |
| 59 | Alfie Burden | England | 14400 |
| 60 | Jimmy Michie | England | 14337 |
| 61 | Bjorn Haneveer | Belgium | 14175 |
| 62 | Andy Hicks | England | 14012 |
| 63 | Darren Morgan | Wales | 12912 |
| 64 | Shaun Murphy | England | 12900 |
