= List of snooker Triple Crown finals =

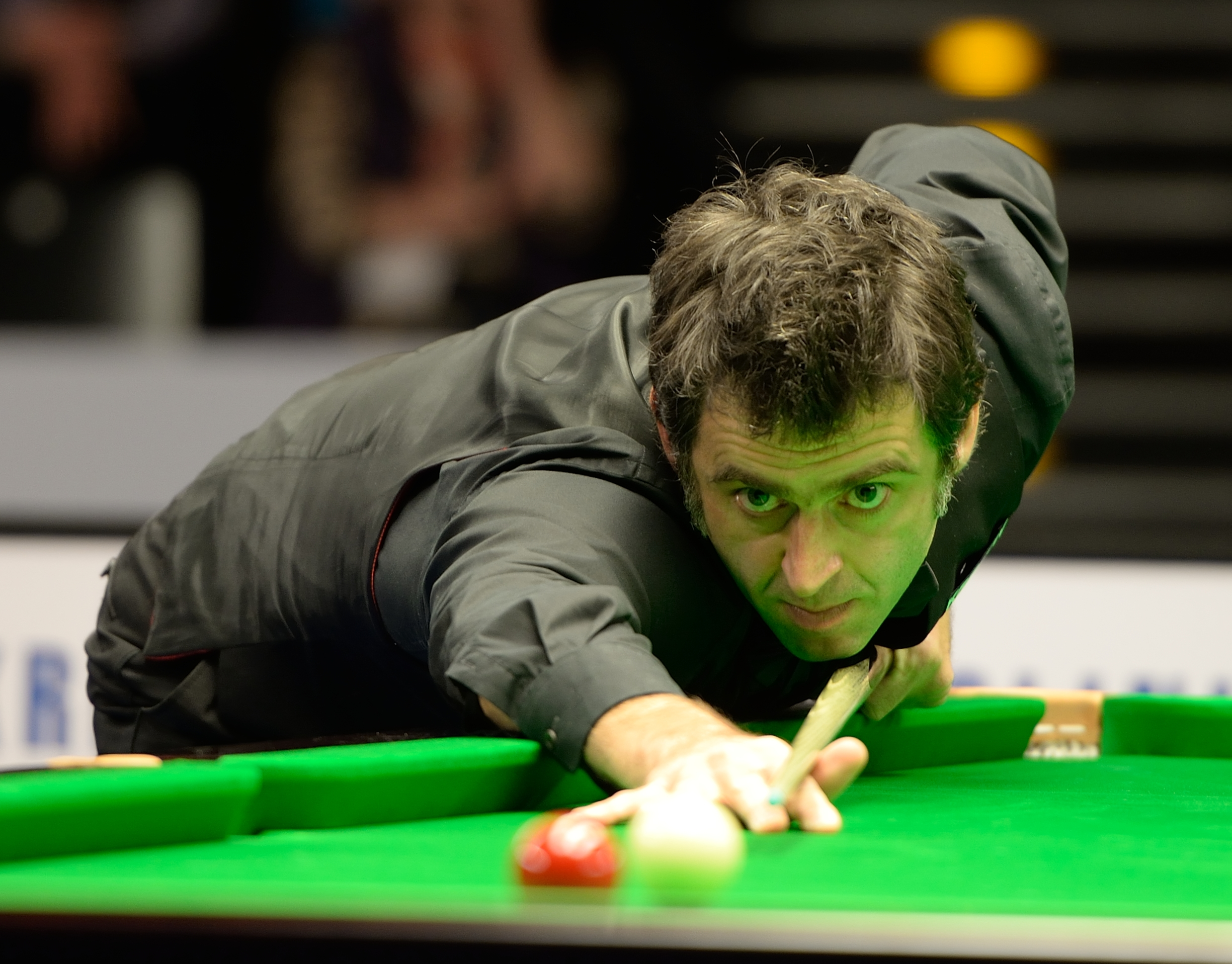
Ronnie O'Sullivan has won a record 23 Triple Crown events.

The Triple Crown in the sport of snooker is the achievement of winning three specific events: the UK Championship, the Masters, and the World Snooker Championship. First introduced in 1927, the World Snooker Championship reverted to being played as a knockout tournament in 1969, with all subsequent competition considered as the "modern era" of snooker. The Masters was introduced in 1975, and the UK Championship in 1977. The UK Championship was only contested between British residents and passport holders until 1984, when it became open to all professional overseas players. The Triple Crown events are generally the most prestigious on the calendar, with the three winners in the 2021–22 snooker season earning more prize money than from any of the other events.

English player Ronnie O'Sullivan has won 23 Triple Crown titles, having contested a record 31 finals. He is one of 11 players to have won each of the three events at least once, the others being Steve Davis, Terry Griffiths, Alex Higgins, Stephen Hendry, John Higgins, Mark Williams, Neil Robertson, Mark Selby, Shaun Murphy and Judd Trump. The finals held at each of the Triple Crown events are listed below.

== UK Championship finals ==
List of UK Championship finals
Year	Winner	Runner-up	Score	Season	Venue
1977 (Note: Referee: John Williams.)	Patsy Fagan	Doug Mountjoy	12–9	1977–78	Tower Circus, Blackpool
1978	Doug Mountjoy	David Taylor	15–9	1978–79	Preston Guild Hall, Preston
1979	John Virgo	Terry Griffiths	14–13	1979–80	Preston Guild Hall, Preston
1980 (Note: Referees: Jim Thorpe and John Williams.)	Steve Davis	Alex Higgins	16–6	1980–81	Preston Guild Hall, Preston
1981	Steve Davis	Terry Griffiths	16–3	1981–82	Preston Guild Hall, Preston
1982	Terry Griffiths	Alex Higgins	16–15	1982–83	Preston Guild Hall, Preston
1983 (Note: Referee: Len Ganley.)	Alex Higgins	Steve Davis	16–15	1983–84	Preston Guild Hall, Preston
1984 (Note: Referee: Jim Thorpe.)	Steve Davis	Alex Higgins	16–8	1984–85	Preston Guild Hall, Preston
1985	Steve Davis	Willie Thorne	16–14	1985–86	Preston Guild Hall, Preston
1986 (Note: Referee: John Street.)	Steve Davis	Neal Foulds	16–7	1986–87	Preston Guild Hall, Preston
1987	Steve Davis	Jimmy White	16–14	1987–88	Preston Guild Hall, Preston
1988	Doug Mountjoy	Stephen Hendry	16–12	1988–89	Preston Guild Hall, Preston
1989	Stephen Hendry	Steve Davis	16–12	1989–90	Preston Guild Hall, Preston
1990	Stephen Hendry	Steve Davis	16–15	1990–91	Preston Guild Hall, Preston
1991	John Parrott	Jimmy White	16–13	1991–92	Preston Guild Hall, Preston
1992	Jimmy White	John Parrott	16–9	1992–93	Preston Guild Hall, Preston
1993	Ronnie O'Sullivan	Stephen Hendry	10–6	1993–94	Preston Guild Hall, Preston
1994	Stephen Hendry	Ken Doherty	10–5	1994–95	Preston Guild Hall, Preston
1995 (Note: Referee: Paul Harrison.)	Stephen Hendry	Peter Ebdon	10–3	1995–96	Preston Guild Hall, Preston
1996	Stephen Hendry	John Higgins	10–9	1996–97	Preston Guild Hall, Preston
1997	Ronnie O'Sullivan	Stephen Hendry	10–6	1997–98	Preston Guild Hall, Preston
1998 (Note: Referee: Alan Chamberlain.)	John Higgins	Matthew Stevens	10–6	1998–99	Bournemouth International Centre
1999	Mark Williams	Matthew Stevens	10–8	1999–00	Bournemouth International Centre
2000	John Higgins	Mark Williams	10–4	2000–01	Bournemouth International Centre
2001 (Note: Referee: Eirian Williams.)	Ronnie O'Sullivan	Ken Doherty	10–1	2001–02	Barbican Centre, York
2002 (Note: Referee: Stuart Bennett.)	Mark Williams	Ken Doherty	10–9	2002–03	Barbican Centre, York
2003 (Note: Referee: Colin Brinded.)	Matthew Stevens	Stephen Hendry	10–8	2003–04	Barbican Centre, York
2004	Stephen Maguire	David Gray	10–1	2004–05	Barbican Centre, York
2005 (Note: Referee: Jan Verhaas.)	Ding Junhui	Steve Davis	10–6	2005–06	Barbican Centre, York
2006	Peter Ebdon	Stephen Hendry	10–6	2006–07	Barbican Centre, York
2007	Ronnie O'Sullivan	Stephen Maguire	10–2	2007–08	Telford International Centre, Telford
2008	Shaun Murphy	Marco Fu	10–9	2008–09	Telford International Centre, Telford
2009	Ding Junhui	John Higgins	10–8	2009–10	Telford International Centre, Telford
2010 (Note: Referee: Brendan Moore.)	John Higgins	Mark Williams	10–9	2010–11	Telford International Centre, Telford
2011	Judd Trump	Mark Allen	10–8	2011–12	Barbican Centre, York
2012 (Note: Referee: Leo Scullion.)	Mark Selby	Shaun Murphy	10–6	2012–13	Barbican Centre, York
2013	Neil Robertson	Mark Selby	10–7	2013–14	Barbican Centre, York
2014 (Note: Referee: Terry Camilleri.)	Ronnie O'Sullivan	Judd Trump	10–9	2014–15	Barbican Centre, York
2015	Neil Robertson	Liang Wenbo	10–5	2015–16	Barbican Centre, York
2016 (Note: Referee: Olivier Marteel.)	Mark Selby	Ronnie O'Sullivan	10–7	2016–17	Barbican Centre, York
2017 (Note: Referee: Paul Collier.)	Ronnie O'Sullivan	Shaun Murphy	10–5	2017–18	Barbican Centre, York
2018 (Note: Referee: Marcel Eckardt.)	Ronnie O'Sullivan	Mark Allen	10–6	2018–19	Barbican Centre, York
2019 (Note: Referee: Greg Coniglio.)	Ding Junhui	Stephen Maguire	10–6	2019–20	Barbican Centre, York
2020	Neil Robertson	Judd Trump	10–9	2020–21	Marshall Arena, Milton Keynes
2021 (Note: Referee: Ben Williams.)	Zhao Xintong	Luca Brecel	10–5	2021–22	Barbican Centre, York
2022 (Note: Referee: Desislava Bozhilova.)	Mark Allen	Ding Junhui	10–7	2022–23	Barbican Centre, York
2023 (Note: Referee: Rob Spencer.)	Ronnie O'Sullivan	Ding Junhui	10–7	2023–24	Barbican Centre, York
2024 (Note: Referee: Tatiana Woollaston.)	Judd Trump	Barry Hawkins	10–8	2024–25	Barbican Centre, York
2025	Mark Selby	Judd Trump	10–8	2025–26	Barbican Centre, York
2026 (Note: Referee: Peggy Li.)			–	2026–27	Barbican Centre, York

== Masters finals ==
List of Masters finals
Year	Winner	Runner-up	Score	Season	Venue
1975 (Note: Referee: Gus Lillygreen.)	John Spencer	Ray Reardon	9–8	1974–75	West Centre Hotel, London
1976	Ray Reardon	Graham Miles	7–3	1975–76	New London Theatre, London
1977	Doug Mountjoy	Ray Reardon	7–6	1976–77	New London Theatre, London
1978	Alex Higgins	Cliff Thorburn	7–5	1977–78	New London Theatre, London
1979 (Note: Referee: John Smyth.)	Perrie Mans	Alex Higgins	8–4	1978–79	Wembley Conference Centre, London
1980	Terry Griffiths	Alex Higgins	9–5	1979–80	Wembley Conference Centre, London
1981	Alex Higgins	Terry Griffiths	9–6	1980–81	Wembley Conference Centre, London
1982	Steve Davis	Terry Griffiths	9–5	1981–82	Wembley Conference Centre, London
1983	Cliff Thorburn	Ray Reardon	9–7	1982–83	Wembley Conference Centre, London
1984	Jimmy White	Terry Griffiths	9–5	1983–84	Wembley Conference Centre, London
1985	Cliff Thorburn	Doug Mountjoy	9–6	1984–85	Wembley Conference Centre, London
1986	Cliff Thorburn	Jimmy White	9–5	1985–86	Wembley Conference Centre, London
1987	Dennis Taylor	Alex Higgins	9–8	1986–87	Wembley Conference Centre, London
1988	Steve Davis	Mike Hallett	9–0	1987–88	Wembley Conference Centre, London
1989	Stephen Hendry	John Parrott	9–6	1988–89	Wembley Conference Centre, London
1990	Stephen Hendry	John Parrott	9–4	1989–90	Wembley Conference Centre, London
1991	Stephen Hendry	Mike Hallett	9–8	1990–91	Wembley Conference Centre, London
1992	Stephen Hendry	John Parrott	9–4	1991–92	Wembley Conference Centre, London
1993	Stephen Hendry	James Wattana	9–5	1992–93	Wembley Conference Centre, London
1994	Alan McManus	Stephen Hendry	9–8	1993–94	Wembley Conference Centre, London
1995	Ronnie O'Sullivan	John Higgins	9–3	1994–95	Wembley Conference Centre, London
1996	Stephen Hendry	Ronnie O'Sullivan	10–5	1995–96	Wembley Conference Centre, London
1997	Steve Davis	Ronnie O'Sullivan	10–8	1996–97	Wembley Conference Centre, London
1998	Mark Williams	Stephen Hendry	10–9	1997–98	Wembley Conference Centre, London
1999	John Higgins	Ken Doherty	10–8	1998–99	Wembley Conference Centre, London
2000	Matthew Stevens	Ken Doherty	10–8	1999–00	Wembley Conference Centre, London
2001	Paul Hunter	Fergal O'Brien	10–9	2000–01	Wembley Conference Centre, London
2002	Paul Hunter	Mark Williams	10–9	2001–02	Wembley Conference Centre, London
2003	Mark Williams	Stephen Hendry	10–4	2002–03	Wembley Conference Centre, London
2004	Paul Hunter	Ronnie O'Sullivan	10–9	2003–04	Wembley Conference Centre, London
2005	Ronnie O'Sullivan	John Higgins	10–3	2004–05	Wembley Conference Centre, London
2006	John Higgins	Ronnie O'Sullivan	10–9	2005–06	Wembley Conference Centre, London
2007	Ronnie O'Sullivan	Ding Junhui	10–3	2006–07	Wembley Arena, London
2008 (Note: Referee: Michaela Tabb.)	Mark Selby	Stephen Lee	10–3	2007–08	Wembley Arena, London
2009	Ronnie O'Sullivan	Mark Selby	10–8	2008–09	Wembley Arena, London
2010	Mark Selby	Ronnie O'Sullivan	10–9	2009–10	Wembley Arena, London
2011	Ding Junhui	Marco Fu	10–4	2010–11	Wembley Arena, London
2012	Neil Robertson	Shaun Murphy	10–6	2011–12	Alexandra Palace, London
2013	Mark Selby	Neil Robertson	10–6	2012–13	Alexandra Palace, London
2014	Ronnie O'Sullivan	Mark Selby	10–4	2013–14	Alexandra Palace, London
2015	Shaun Murphy	Neil Robertson	10–2	2014–15	Alexandra Palace, London
2016	Ronnie O'Sullivan	Barry Hawkins	10–1	2015–16	Alexandra Palace, London
2017	Ronnie O'Sullivan	Joe Perry	10–7	2016–17	Alexandra Palace, London
2018	Mark Allen	Kyren Wilson	10–7	2017–18	Alexandra Palace, London
2019	Judd Trump	Ronnie O'Sullivan	10–4	2018–19	Alexandra Palace, London
2020	Stuart Bingham	Ali Carter	10–8	2019–20	Alexandra Palace, London
2021	Yan Bingtao	John Higgins	10–8	2020–21	Marshall Arena, Milton Keynes
2022	Neil Robertson	Barry Hawkins	10–4	2021–22	Alexandra Palace, London
2023	Judd Trump	Mark Williams	10–8	2022–23	Alexandra Palace, London
2024	Ronnie O'Sullivan	Ali Carter	10–7	2023–24	Alexandra Palace, London
2025	Shaun Murphy	Kyren Wilson	10–7	2024–25	Alexandra Palace, London
2026	Kyren Wilson	John Higgins	10–6	2025–26	Alexandra Palace, London

== World Snooker Championship finals ==
List of World Snooker Championship winners
Year	Winner	Runner-up	Score	Season	Venue
1969 (Note: Referee: Harold Phillips.)	John Spencer	Gary Owen	37–24	1968–69	Victoria Hall, London
1970 (Note: Referee: unknown)	Ray Reardon	John Pulman	37–33	1969–70	Victoria Hall, London
1971 (Note: Referee: unknown)	John Spencer	Warren Simpson	37–29	1970–71	Chevron Hotel, Sydney
1972	Alex Higgins	John Spencer	37–31	1971–72	Selly Park British Legion, Birmingham
1973 (Note: Referee: Bill Timms.)	Ray Reardon	Eddie Charlton	38–32	1972–73	City Exhibition Hall, Manchester
1974	Ray Reardon	Graham Miles	22–12	1973–74	Belle Vue, Manchester
1975	Ray Reardon	Eddie Charlton	31–30	1974–75	Nunawading Basketball Centre, Melbourne
1976 (Note: Referees: Bill Timms and John Williams.)	Ray Reardon	Alex Higgins	27–16	1975–76	Wythenshawe Forum, Manchester
1977	John Spencer	Cliff Thorburn	25–21	1976–77	Crucible Theatre, Sheffield
1978	Ray Reardon	Perrie Mans	25–18	1977–78	Crucible Theatre, Sheffield
1979	Terry Griffiths	Dennis Taylor	24–16	1978–79	Crucible Theatre, Sheffield
1980	Cliff Thorburn	Alex Higgins	18–16	1979–80	Crucible Theatre, Sheffield
1981	Steve Davis	Doug Mountjoy	18–12	1980–81	Crucible Theatre, Sheffield
1982	Alex Higgins	Ray Reardon	18–15	1981–82	Crucible Theatre, Sheffield
1983	Steve Davis	Cliff Thorburn	18–6	1982–83	Crucible Theatre, Sheffield
1984	Steve Davis	Jimmy White	18–16	1983–84	Crucible Theatre, Sheffield
1985	Dennis Taylor	Steve Davis	18–17	1984–85	Crucible Theatre, Sheffield
1986	Joe Johnson	Steve Davis	18–12	1985–86	Crucible Theatre, Sheffield
1987	Steve Davis	Joe Johnson	18–14	1986–87	Crucible Theatre, Sheffield
1988	Steve Davis	Terry Griffiths	18–11	1987–88	Crucible Theatre, Sheffield
1989	Steve Davis	John Parrott	18–3	1988–89	Crucible Theatre, Sheffield
1990	Stephen Hendry	Jimmy White	18–12	1989–90	Crucible Theatre, Sheffield
1991	John Parrott	Jimmy White	18–11	1990–91	Crucible Theatre, Sheffield
1992	Stephen Hendry	Jimmy White	18–14	1991–92	Crucible Theatre, Sheffield
1993	Stephen Hendry	Jimmy White	18–5	1992–93	Crucible Theatre, Sheffield
1994	Stephen Hendry	Jimmy White	18–17	1993–94	Crucible Theatre, Sheffield
1995	Stephen Hendry	Nigel Bond	18–9	1994–95	Crucible Theatre, Sheffield
1996	Stephen Hendry	Peter Ebdon	18–12	1995–96	Crucible Theatre, Sheffield
1997	Ken Doherty	Stephen Hendry	18–12	1996–97	Crucible Theatre, Sheffield
1998 (Note: Referee: Lawrie Annandale.)	John Higgins	Ken Doherty	18–12	1997–98	Crucible Theatre, Sheffield
1999	Stephen Hendry	Mark Williams	18–11	1998–99	Crucible Theatre, Sheffield
2000 (Note: Referee: John Newton.)	Mark Williams	Matthew Stevens	18–16	1999–00	Crucible Theatre, Sheffield
2001	Ronnie O'Sullivan	John Higgins	18–14	2000–01	Crucible Theatre, Sheffield
2002	Peter Ebdon	Stephen Hendry	18–17	2001–02	Crucible Theatre, Sheffield
2003	Mark Williams	Ken Doherty	18–16	2002–03	Crucible Theatre, Sheffield
2004	Ronnie O'Sullivan	Graeme Dott	18–8	2003–04	Crucible Theatre, Sheffield
2005	Shaun Murphy	Matthew Stevens	18–16	2004–05	Crucible Theatre, Sheffield
2006	Graeme Dott	Peter Ebdon	18–14	2005–06	Crucible Theatre, Sheffield
2007	John Higgins	Mark Selby	18–13	2006–07	Crucible Theatre, Sheffield
2008	Ronnie O'Sullivan	Ali Carter	18–8	2007–08	Crucible Theatre, Sheffield
2009	John Higgins	Shaun Murphy	18–9	2008–09	Crucible Theatre, Sheffield
2010	Neil Robertson	Graeme Dott	18–13	2009–10	Crucible Theatre, Sheffield
2011	John Higgins	Judd Trump	18–15	2010–11	Crucible Theatre, Sheffield
2012	Ronnie O'Sullivan	Ali Carter	18–11	2011–12	Crucible Theatre, Sheffield
2013	Ronnie O'Sullivan	Barry Hawkins	18–12	2012–13	Crucible Theatre, Sheffield
2014	Mark Selby	Ronnie O'Sullivan	18–14	2013–14	Crucible Theatre, Sheffield
2015	Stuart Bingham	Shaun Murphy	18–15	2014–15	Crucible Theatre, Sheffield
2016	Mark Selby	Ding Junhui	18–14	2015–16	Crucible Theatre, Sheffield
2017	Mark Selby	John Higgins	18–15	2016–17	Crucible Theatre, Sheffield
2018	Mark Williams	John Higgins	18–16	2017–18	Crucible Theatre, Sheffield
2019	Judd Trump	John Higgins	18–9	2018–19	Crucible Theatre, Sheffield
2020	Ronnie O'Sullivan	Kyren Wilson	18–8	2019–20	Crucible Theatre, Sheffield
2021	Mark Selby	Shaun Murphy	18–15	2020–21	Crucible Theatre, Sheffield
2022	Ronnie O'Sullivan	Judd Trump	18–13	2021–22	Crucible Theatre, Sheffield
2023	Luca Brecel	Mark Selby	18–15	2022–23	Crucible Theatre, Sheffield
2024	Kyren Wilson	Jak Jones	18–14	2023–24	Crucible Theatre, Sheffield
2025	Zhao Xintong	Mark Williams	18–12	2024–25	Crucible Theatre, Sheffield
2026	Wu Yize	Shaun Murphy	18–17	2025–26	Crucible Theatre, Sheffield

== Players who have appeared in multiple finals ==
Legend
†	Player has won the career Triple Crown.

Player	Finals	Winner	Runner-up
Ronnie O'Sullivan †	31	23	8
Stephen Hendry †	28	18	10
Steve Davis †	21	15	6
John Higgins †	19	9	10
Mark Selby †	15	10	5
Mark Williams †	13	7	6
Alex Higgins †	13	5	8
Ray Reardon	11	7	4
Shaun Murphy †	11	4	7
Jimmy White	11	2	9
Judd Trump †	10	5	5
Terry Griffiths †	9	3	6
Neil Robertson †	8	6	2
Ding Junhui	8	4	4
Ken Doherty	8	1	7
Cliff Thorburn	7	4	3
John Parrott	7	2	5
Doug Mountjoy	6	3	3
Matthew Stevens	6	2	4
John Spencer	5	4	1
Kyren Wilson	5	2	3
Peter Ebdon	5	2	3
Mark Allen	4	2	2
Ali Carter	4	0	4
Barry Hawkins	4	0	4
Paul Hunter	3	3	0
Dennis Taylor	3	2	1
Graeme Dott	3	1	2
Stephen Maguire	3	1	2
Stuart Bingham	2	2	0
Zhao Xintong	2	2	0
Luca Brecel	2	1	1
Joe Johnson	2	1	1
Perrie Mans	2	1	1
Eddie Charlton	2	0	2
Marco Fu	2	0	2
Mike Hallett	2	0	2
Graham Miles	2	0	2

== See also ==
- List of snooker players by number of ranking titles
