= 1999 UK Championship =

1999 Liverpool Victoria UK Championship
Tournament information
- Dates: 13–28 November 1999
- Venue: Bournemouth International Centre
- City: Bournemouth
- Country: England
- Organisation: WPBSA
- Format: Ranking event
- Total prize fund: £500,000
- Winner's share: £78,000
- Highest break: Stephen Hendry (SCO) (147)

Final
- Champion: Mark Williams (WAL)
- Runner-up: Matthew Stevens (WAL)
- Score: 10–8

The 1999 UK Championship (officially the 1999 Liverpool Victoria UK Championship) was a professional ranking snooker tournament that took place at the Bournemouth International Centre in Bournemouth, England. The event started on 13 November 1999 and the televised stages were shown on the BBC between 20 and 28 November 1999.

Stephen Hendry became the first player to make two maximum breaks in the tournament's history after scoring a 147 against Paul Wykes in the last 16.

In the final Mark Williams defeated Matthew Stevens 10–8. This was Stevens' second consecutive final at the event.

== Tournament summary ==
Defending champion John Higgins was the number 1 seed with World Champion Stephen Hendry seeded 2. The remaining places were allocated to players based on the world rankings.

== Prize fund ==
The breakdown of prize money for this year is shown below:

- Winner: £78,000
- Runner-up: £41,000
- Semi-finalists: £20,600
- Quarter-finalists: £11,200
- Last 16: £5,760
- Last 32: £3,650
- Last 64: £3,125
- Last 96: £1,525
- Last 128: £1,100
- Total: £500,000

== Main draw ==
=== Top half ===
Last 64; Best of 17 frames
1	(Scotland) John Higgins	9
138	(Scotland) David McLellan	3
18	(Scotland) Chris Small	9
53	(England) Jonathan Birch	3
27	(Scotland) Jamie Burnett	9
103	(England) Ian Brumby	7
15	(England) Steve Davis	9
110	(England) Paul Sweeny	6
11	(Republic of Ireland) Fergal O'Brien	8
46	(Wales) Lee Walker	9
32	(England) Andy Hicks	8
63	(England) Jimmy Michie	9
20	(Malta) Tony Drago	9
49	(England) Gary Ponting	6
8	(Scotland) Alan McManus	8
74	(England) Michael Holt	9
5	(England) John Parrott	9
59	(England) Joe Johnson	7
28	(Northern Ireland) Joe Swail	9
112	(Wales) Mark Fenton	4
21	(England) Nigel Bond	9
61	(England) Alfie Burden	5
9	(Wales) Matthew Stevens	9
34	(England) Joe Perry	8
10	(England) Anthony Hamilton	9
58	(England) David Roe	7
24	(Scotland) Billy Snaddon	3
35	(Hong Kong) Marco Fu	9
22	(Thailand) James Wattana	6
83	(England) Wayne Brown	9
4	(England) Ronnie O'Sullivan	9
44	(England) Steve James	3

Last 32; Best of 17 frames
1	(Scotland) John Higgins	9
18	(Scotland) Chris Small	5
27	(Scotland) Jamie Burnett	5
15	(England) Steve Davis	9
46	(Wales) Lee Walker	9
63	(England) Jimmy Michie	5
20	(Malta) Tony Drago	1
74	(England) Michael Holt	9
5	(England) John Parrott	5
28	(Northern Ireland) Joe Swail	9
21	(England) Nigel Bond	2
9	(Wales) Matthew Stevens	9
10	(England) Anthony Hamilton	9
35	(Hong Kong) Marco Fu	5
83	(England) Wayne Brown	2
4	(England) Ronnie O'Sullivan	9

Last 16; Best of 17 frames
1	(Scotland) John Higgins	9
15	(England) Steve Davis	4
46	(Wales) Lee Walker	4
74	(England) Michael Holt	9
28	(Northern Ireland) Joe Swail	4
9	(Wales) Matthew Stevens	9
10	(England) Anthony Hamilton	1
4	(England) Ronnie O'Sullivan	9

Quarter-finals; Best of 17 frames
1	(Scotland) John Higgins	9
74	(England) Michael Holt	6
9	(Wales) Matthew Stevens	9
4	(England) Ronnie O'Sullivan	3

Semi-final; Best of 17 frames
1	(Scotland) John Higgins	7
9	(Wales) Matthew Stevens	9

=== Bottom half ===
Last 64; Best of 17 frames
3	(Wales) Mark Williams	9
(England) Mark Selby	0
26	(Australia) Quinten Hann	w/d
67	(Republic of Ireland) Michael Judge	w/o
30	(Northern Ireland) Terry Murphy	9
100	(England) Robert Milkins	6
16	(England) Jimmy White	9
38	(Wales) Paul Davies	6
13	(England) Peter Ebdon	4
69	(Pakistan) Shokat Ali	9
23	(Wales) Darren Morgan	9
60	(England) David Gray	8
19	(Wales) Dominic Dale	4
45	(Scotland) Drew Henry	9
6	(England) Stephen Lee	9
84	(Northern Ireland) Patrick Wallace	4
7	(Republic of Ireland) Ken Doherty	9
79	(England) Mark Gray	2
25	(Scotland) Graeme Dott	9
80	(Wales) Anthony Davies	2
17	(England) Dave Harold	9
57	(England) Mick Price	3
12	(England) Paul Hunter	9
95	(Thailand) Phaitoon Phonbun	6
14	(England) Mark King	9
193	(Scotland) Stephen Maguire	2
29	(England) Gary Wilkinson	3
56	(England) Paul Wykes	9
31	(England) Brian Morgan	7
68	(England) Stuart Pettman	9
2	(Scotland) Stephen Hendry	9
50	(England) Jason Ferguson	8

Last 32; Best of 17 frames
3	(Wales) Mark Williams	9
67	(Republic of Ireland) Michael Judge	4
30	(Northern Ireland) Terry Murphy	5
16	(England) Jimmy White	9
69	(Pakistan) Shokat Ali	5
23	(Wales) Darren Morgan	9
45	(Scotland) Drew Henry	9
6	(England) Stephen Lee	8
7	(Republic of Ireland) Ken Doherty	9
25	(Scotland) Graeme Dott	4
17	(England) Dave Harold	9
12	(England) Paul Hunter	5
14	(England) Mark King	7
56	(England) Paul Wykes	9
68	(England) Stuart Pettman	6
2	(Scotland) Stephen Hendry	9

Last 16; Best of 17 frames
3	(Wales) Mark Williams	9
16	(England) Jimmy White	8
23	(Wales) Darren Morgan	9
45	(Scotland) Drew Henry	7
7	(Republic of Ireland) Ken Doherty	8
17	(England) Dave Harold	9
56	(England) Paul Wykes	3
2	(Scotland) Stephen Hendry	9

Quarter-finals; Best of 17 frames
3	(Wales) Mark Williams	9
23	(Wales) Darren Morgan	1
17	(England) Dave Harold	5
2	(Scotland) Stephen Hendry	9

Semi-final; Best of 17 frames
3	(Wales) Mark Williams	9
2	(Scotland) Stephen Hendry	6

== Final ==
Final: Best of 19 frames. Referee: Alan Chamberlain. Bournemouth International Centre, Bournemouth, England, 28 November 1999.
Matthew Stevens (9); Wales	8–10	Mark Williams (3); Wales
Afternoon: 67–24, 81–0 (81), 16–72 (60), 4–67, 46–71 (65), 8–76, 5–71 (58), 32–65, 68–0 (60); Evening: 73–27, 63–47, 110–0 (110), 63–67 (50), 21–56, 22–62, 80–25 (75), 71–0 (71), 51–54 (Stevens 50)
110	Highest break	65
1	Century breaks	0
6	50+ breaks	4

== Qualifying ==
Round of 128 Best of 11 frames

(Scotland) David McLellan 6–4 Mark Bennett (Wales)

(England) Stuart Bingham 6–5 Kristján Helgason (Iceland)

(England) Ian Brumby 6–1 Chris Scanlon (England)

(England) Paul Sweeny 6–5 Leigh Griffin (England)

(England) Sean Storey 6–2 Adrian Gunnell (England)

(Wales) Gareth Chilcott 6–2 Dene O'Kane (New Zealand)

(England) Ali Carter 6–3 Stephen O'Connor (Republic of Ireland)

(England) Michael Holt 6–5 James Reynolds (Wales)

(England) Tony Jones 6–5 Hugh Abernethy (Scotland)

(Wales) Mark Fenton 6–1 Dennis Taylor (Northern Ireland)

(England) Nick Pearce 6–2 Peter McCullagh (England)

(Scotland) Martin Dziewialtowski 6–2 Munraj Pal (England)

(Cyprus) Mehmet Husnu 6–5 Tony Chappel (Wales)

(England) Craig Harrison 6–3 Craig MacGillivray (Scotland)

(England) Wayne Brown 6–3 Lee Richardson (England)

(England) Karl Burrows 6–5 Barry Pinches (England)

(England) Mark Selby 6–3 Tony Knowles (England)

(Republic of Ireland) Michael Judge 6–3 Mario Geudens (Belgium)

(England) Robert Milkins 6–2 Karl Broughton (England)

(Wales) Wayne Jones 6–3 Leo Fernandez (Republic of Ireland)

(Pakistan) Shokat Ali 6–3 Nick Dyson (England)

(Scotland) John Lardner 6–3 Wayne Saidler (England)

(England) Mark Davis 6–2 Patrick Delsemme (Belgium)

(Northern Ireland) Patrick Wallace 6–5 Darren Clarke (England)

(England) Mark Gray 6–0 Eddie Manning (England)

(Wales) Anthony Davies 6–2 Ryan Day (Wales)

(England) Steve Judd 6–2 Nick Terry (England)

(Thailand) Phaitoon Phonbun 6–2 Richard King (England)

(Scotland) Stephen Maguire 6–5 Stefan Mazrocis (England)

(England) Willie Thorne 6–2 Mike Dunn (England)

(England) Stuart Pettman 6–3 Noppadon Noppachorn (Thailand)

(England) Troy Shaw 6–3 Robin Hull (Finland)

Round of 96 Best of 11 frames

(Scotland) David McLellan w/o–w/d Alain Robidoux (Canada)

(England) Jonathan Birch 6–3 Stuart Bingham (England)

(England) Ian Brumby 6–2 Euan Henderson (Scotland)

(England) Paul Sweeny 6–2 Matthew Couch (England)

(Wales) Lee Walker 6–4 Sean Storey (England)

(England) Jimmy Michie 6–4 Gareth Chilcott (Wales)

(England) Gary Ponting 6–3 Ali Carter (England)

(England) Michael Holt 6–4 Peter Lines (England)

(England) Joe Johnson 6–4 Tony Jones (England)

(Wales) Mark Fenton 6–0 Jason Prince (Northern Ireland)

(England) Alfie Burden 6–5 Nick Pearce (England)

(England) Joe Perry 6–3 Martin Dziewialtowski (Scotland)

(England) David Roe 6–5 Mehmet Husnu (Cyprus)

(Hong Kong) Marco Fu 6–0 Craig Harrison (England)

(England) Wayne Brown 6–2 Nick Walker (England)

(England) Steve James 6–4 Karl Burrows (England)

(England) Mark Selby 6–4 John Read (England)

(Republic of Ireland) Michael Judge 6–3 Gerard Greene (Northern Ireland)

(England) Robert Milkins 6–2 Rod Lawler (England)

(Wales) Paul Davies 6–3 Wayne Jones (Wales)

(Pakistan) Shokat Ali 6–3 Dean Reynolds (England)

(England) David Gray 6–4 John Lardner (Scotland)

(Scotland) Drew Henry 6–2 Mark Davis (England)

(Northern Ireland) Patrick Wallace 6–4 Marcus Campbell (Scotland)

(England) Mark Gray 6–2 Martin Clark (England)

(Wales) Anthony Davies 6–3 Bradley Jones (England)

(England) Mick Price 6–5 Steve Judd (England)

(Thailand) Phaitoon Phonbun 6–5 Dave Finbow (England)

(Scotland) Stephen Maguire 6–4 Ian McCulloch (England)

(England) Paul Wykes 6–2 Willie Thorne (England)

(England) Stuart Pettman 6–2 Neal Foulds (England)

(England) Jason Ferguson 6–3 Troy Shaw (England)
