= 1999 World Snooker Championship =

Professional snooker tournament

1999 Embassy World Snooker Championship
Tournament information
- Dates: 17 April – 3 May 1999
- Venue: Crucible Theatre
- City: Sheffield
- Country: England
- Organisation: WPBSA
- Format: Ranking event
- Total prize fund: £1,400,000
- Winner's share: £230,000
- Highest break: John Higgins (SCO) (142)

Final
- Champion: Stephen Hendry (SCO)
- Runner-up: Mark Williams (WAL)
- Score: 18–11

The 1999 World Snooker Championship (officially the 1999 Embassy World Snooker Championship) was a professional snooker tournament that took place from 17 April to 3 May 1999 at the Crucible Theatre in Sheffield, England, the 23rd consecutive year that the World Snooker Championship was staged at the venue. Sponsored by cigarette brand Embassy, the tournament was the ninth and final ranking event of the 1998–99 season. The winner received £230,000 from a total prize fund of £1,400,000.

The top 16 players from the snooker world rankings were seeded through to the main stage at the Crucible. They were joined by the 16 successful players from the qualifying rounds. There were five pre-qualifying rounds and nine qualifying rounds. There were eight Crucible debutants at the tournament: Leo Fernandez, Marco Fu, Gerard Greene, Paul Hunter, John Lardner, Ian McCulloch, Joe Perry, and Nick Walker.

John Higgins was the defending champion, having defeated Ken Doherty 18–12 in the 1998 final to win his maiden world title. He lost 10–17 to Mark Williams in the semi-finals, becoming the ninth player to experience the so-called Crucible curse, referring to the fact that no first-time champion had retained the title since the tournament moved to the Crucible in 1977. Stephen Hendry defeated Williams 18–11 in the final to win a seventh world title in nine years. With this win, Hendry superseded Ray Reardon and Steve Davis, who had each won the tournament six times, to become the most successful player in the modern era of the World Championship. The main stage of the tournament produced 53 century breaks, of which the highest was a 142 by Higgins in his first-round match against Greene.

== Background ==
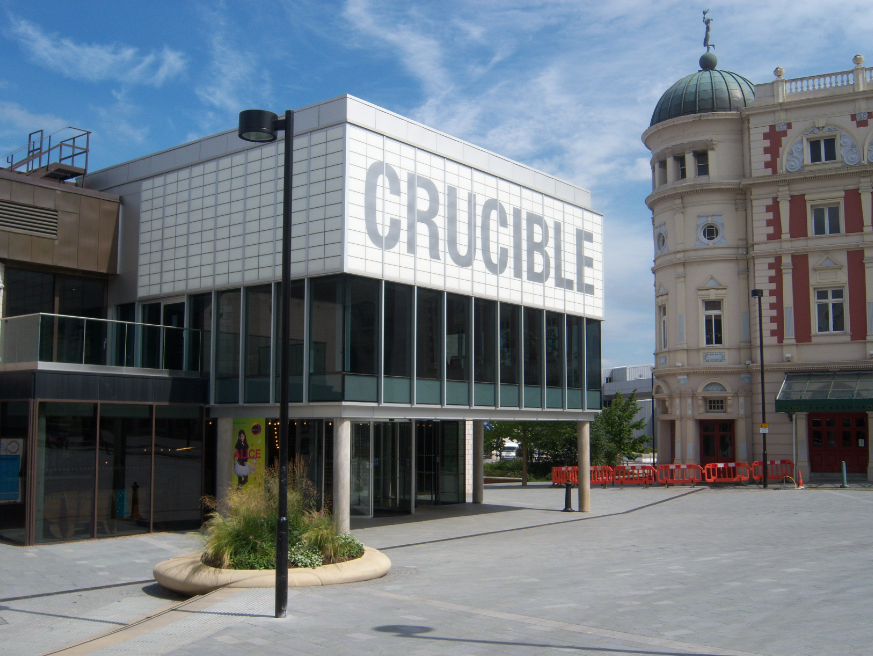
For the 23rd consecutive year, the main stage of the tournament was held at the Crucible Theatre (pictured in 2010) in Sheffield, England.

The inaugural 1927 World Snooker Championship, then known as the Professional Championship of Snooker, took place at various venues in England between November 1926 and May 1927. Joe Davis won the final—held at Camkin's Hall in Birmingham from 9 to 12 May 1927—and went on to win the tournament 15 consecutive times before retiring undefeated after the 1946 edition (no tournaments were held from 1941 to 1945 because of World War II). The tournament went into abeyance after only two players contested the 1952 edition. The six editions of the World Professional Match-play Championship held between 1952 and 1957 are retroactively regarded as legitimate continuations of the World Snooker Championship, but that tournament was discontinued due to waning public interest in snooker in the post-war era. The world title was uncontested between 1958 and 1963.

Then-professional player Rex Williams was instrumental in reviving the World Snooker Championship on a challenge basis in 1964. John Pulman, winner of the 1957 World Professional Match-play Championship, defended the world title across seven challenge matches between 1964 and 1968. The World Snooker Championship reverted to an annual knockout tournament for the 1969 edition, marking the beginning of the championship's "modern era". The 1977 edition was the first staged at the Crucible Theatre in Sheffield, where it has remained since. As of 1999, the most successful players in the modern era were Ray Reardon, Steve Davis, and Stephen Hendry, each having won the title six times. Hendry was also the tournament's youngest winner, having captured his first title at the 1990 event, aged 21 years and 106 days. Reardon was the oldest winner, having secured his sixth title at the 1978 event, aged 45 years and 203 days.

== Overview ==
The 1999 World Snooker Championship was the ninth and last ranking tournament of the 1998–99 snooker season, held from 17 April to 3 May, after the British Open. It was sponsored by cigarette brand Embassy. The 1999 edition marked the 23rd consecutive year that the tournament was held at the Crucible Theatre and the 30th successive year that the World Championship was contested through the modern knockout format. The defending champion was John Higgins, who had defeated Ken Doherty 18–12 in the final of the 1998 World Championship to win his maiden world title.

=== Format ===
The top 16 players in the snooker world rankings were seeded through to the main stage at the Crucible Theatre. They faced 16 players who progressed through the qualifying rounds, which took place from 3 January to 20 March at the Newport Centre in Wales. First-round matches were played as the best of 19 frames, held over two sessions. Second-round and quarter-final matches were played as the best of 25 frames, held over three sessions. The semi-final matches were played as the best of 33 frames, held over four sessions. The final was the best of 35 frames, also held over four sessions.

=== Prize fund ===
The winner received £230,000 from a total prize fund of £1,400,000. The breakdown of prize money is shown below:

- Winner: £230,000
- Runner-up: £135,000
- Semi-final: £68,000
- Quarter-final: £34,000
- Last 16: £18,350
- Last 32: £12,500
- Last 48: £9,250
- Last 64: £6,000
- Last 96: £3,700
- Last 134: £300
- Stage one highest break : £2,000
- Stage two highest break : £20,000
- Stage two maximum break: £147,000
- Total: £1,400,000

== Summary ==
=== Qualifying ===
There were fourteen rounds of qualifying matches. The first six rounds of qualifying were played at Hazel Grove Snooker Club, Stockport, from 11 to 15 December 1998. The first five rounds were the best of 9 frames and round six was the best of 11. Journalist Martin Johnson, who wrote a week before the event that his highest break was only nine, lost 0–5 to Gary Challis in the first round. The reigning Women's World Champion, Kelly Fisher, defeated Arthur Eldridge and Ben Fitzgerald before losing 4–5 to Tim English in the fourth round. Rounds 7 to 11 took place at the Norbreck Castle Hotel, Blackpool, from 14 to 21 January 1999 as best-of-19-frame matches. Mike Hallett recovered from 0–8 down against Kyndon Paddon in round seven to win 10–9, then beat Andy Neck 10–4. However, his 7–10 loss to Robert Milkins in the ninth round meant that Hallett lost his place on the professional tour because of his ranking position.

Rounds 12 to 14 were played at Telford International Centre from 29 March to 2 April, as the best of 19 frames. In the 12th round, the 1985 champion Dennis Taylor, who was considering retiring from the game, lost 3–10 to Nick Walker and commented "That was pathetic ... after 28 years as a professional that would be an embarrassing way to finish off my career". His manager received over 3,000 letters from fans asking Taylor to continue playing. Willie Thorne experienced his heaviest defeat as a professional in his 24-year career, beaten 0–10 by Paul Sweeney. Former world number two Tony Knowles lost 4–10 to Michael Judge. The 1986 winner Joe Johnson recovered from 2–5 down against Robin Hull to win 10–7. Ian McCulloch made a 144 break during his 10–9 win against Barry Pinches, equalling the best break in qualifying that year set by Stephen Maguire. Dean Reynolds was granted permission to play on day release from prison, where he was serving a sentence for drink-driving, and defeated John Read 10–8.

Walker led 9–0 against Rod Lawler in the 13th round, but Lawler won the next eight frames before Walker clinched victory at 10–9. Nick Pearce was mistaken about the day when his match started, and after he was contacted arrived at the venue late, leading to him forfeiting three frames. He went on to defeat Gary Ponting 10–7. Bradley Jones mistakenly potted a red again after potting the penultimate red when level at 7–7 with Leo Fernandez. The seven-point penalty left him needing snookers in that frame; he lost the match 9–10. Fu compiled ten breaks of 50 or more in his 10–4 defeat of Milkins. Reynolds beat Johnson 10–5. Six-time runner-up Jimmy White defeated Reynolds 10–7 in the 14th round to confirm his 19th consecutive appearance at the main event. Graeme Dott made a total clearance of 141 in the first frame of his match against Fu, but Fu won 10–4. Paul Hunter qualified for the first time by defeating Gary Wilkinson in the deciding frame of their match.

=== First round ===
The first round was played between 17 and 22 April as the best of 19 frames held over two sessions. The defending champion, John Higgins, had earned more than £400,000 in prize money during the season. After his opponent, Gerard Greene, made a 95 break to trail 1–2, Higgins won six consecutive frames for an 8–1 lead. He went on to win 10–2. Nigel Bond, who had not reached the quarter-finals of any ranking event during the season, faced Dominic Dale. Dale won the first frame, but Bond then took eight in a row. In the fifteenth frame, Dale scored 167 points: a red plus 44 penalty points from eleven misses plus a 122 break, which set a record for the highest number of total points scored in a single frame during professional competition. The record stood until 2021, when it was broken by Jimmy Robertson, who scored 178 points in a frame during the Scottish Open. Bond won the match 10–6. Facing Fergal O'Brien, Tony Drago had reached the semi-finals of only one ranking tournament that season, the 1998 Irish Open. Drago won the first four frames of the match and went on to secure a 10–4 victory. Anthony Hamilton, runner-up of the 1999 British Open during the season, lost a deciding frame against Chris Small.

John Parrott, champion in 1991, was tied at 8–8 with Terry Murphy, but took the last two frames of the match for victory. Ken Doherty, winner of the 1997 World Championship and runner-up in 1998, had lost the final of the 1999 Masters during the season. He attempted a maximum break in his match against Steve James, but missed the fourteenth red. "I thought the 147 was on when I reached 24. It was a great chance because the reds were nicely spread. You don't get many opportunities to make a maximum, especially here," Doherty said afterwards. In frame seven, James compiled the 500th century break in the history of the World Championship at the Crucible Theatre and also made a 137 total clearance, but lost 3–10 to Doherty, who made breaks of 81, 65, 57, 56 and 54 in the match. Walker faced Alain Robidoux, a semi-finalist the previous year. Robidoux took the first frame, but Walker took five in a row and went on to win the match 10–6. Matthew Stevens made a 120 break as he took the first four frames of his encounter with Peter Ebdon, runner-up in 1996. Stevens also won the last three of the match for a 10–7 victory.

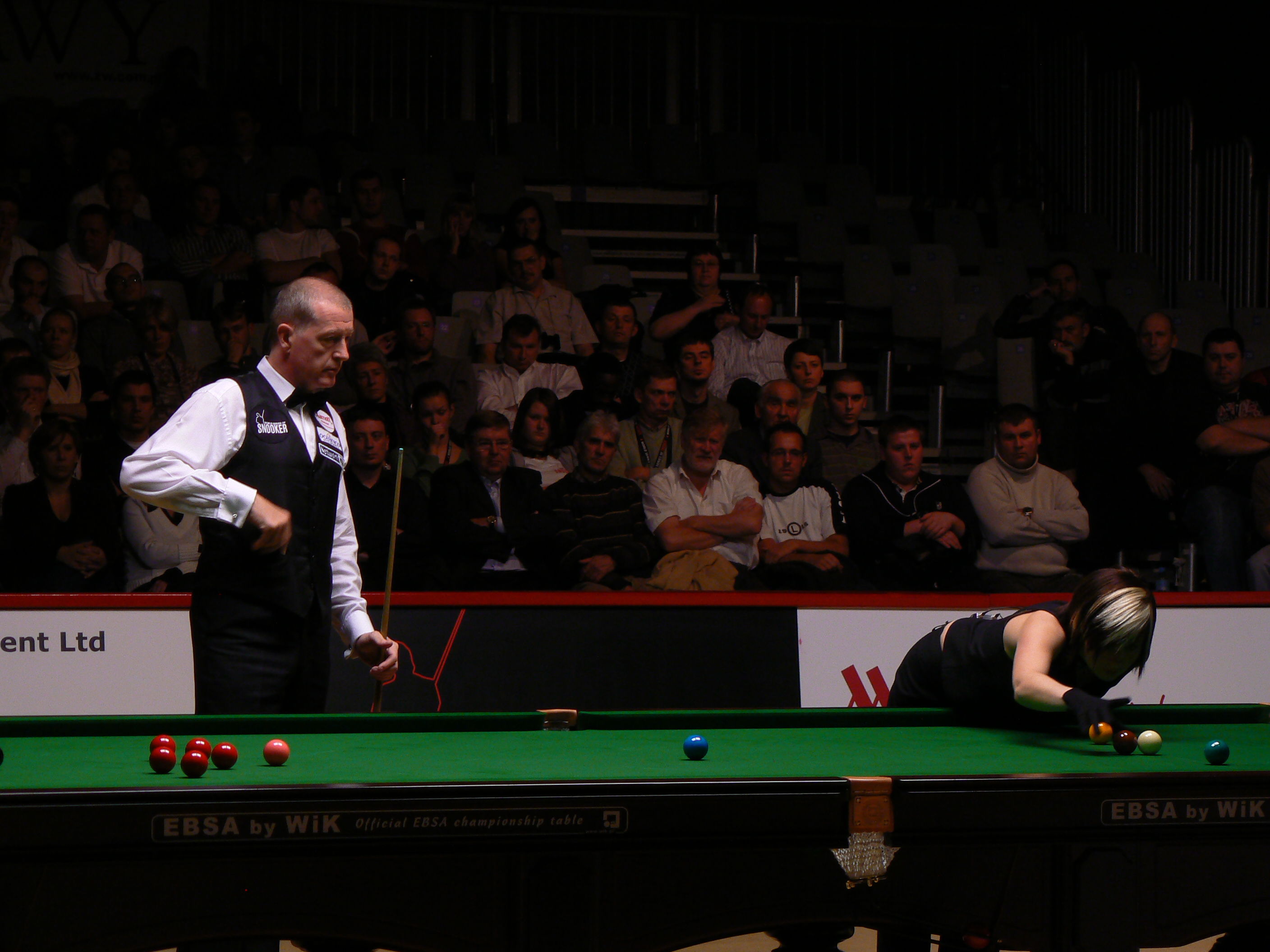
Six-time champion Steve Davis (pictured in 2008) lost a deciding frame to qualifier Joe Perry and exited the tournament in the first round.

In the first all-Asian match at the Crucible, James Wattana, a semi-finalist in 1994 and 1997, built a 5–4 lead against Marco Fu. Fu then went 8–7 ahead, but Wattana won three consecutive frames, making a 136 break in the process, to progress to the second round. Mark King, who had lost three first-round matches that season, was in danger of losing his place in the top 16. He defeated Darren Morgan 10–8 to secure it. Mark Williams, a semi-finalist the previous year, defeated McCulloch 10–4. Six-time World Champion Stephen Hendry, who had won the 1999 Irish Masters and the 1999 Scottish Open during the season, led Hunter 5–4. Hunter led 8–7, but Hendry won three consecutive frames to claim victory. "There were two or three qualifiers most of us wanted to avoid and Paul [Hunter] was one of them. This was a tough match," Hendry said.

Joe Perry had a five-frame advantage at 7–2 over Steve Davis, winner of the event in 1981, 1983, 1984, 1987, 1988 and 1989. Davis recovered to force a deciding frame, in which he built a 52-point lead. However, he missed a blue ball and Perry replied with a clearance of 55 to progress to the second round. "This won't sink in for a day or two but I thought Steve [Davis] would win as he moved nearer and nearer the finishing line. There were only four reds left when I went back to the table and I knew it was my last chance," Perry said. Having reached the Crucible as a qualifier, White faced Alan McManus, runner-up at the season's 1999 Irish Open and 1999 Thailand Masters. Although White won three of the first four frames, McManus won the match 10–7. Stephen Lee, winner of the 1998 Grand Prix, took a 7–2 lead against Crucible debutant John Lardner in their first session. Lardner reduced Lee's lead to 9–7 down, but Lee took the following frame on the colours to claim victory. "That was a real struggle and I'll have to play a lot better if I'm to stay in the championship. There's work to be done," Lee stated. Lardner admitted that his hands "were shaking badly" during the first stages of the match. Ronnie O'Sullivan had won the 1998 Scottish Masters during the season, but then did not compete in the 1998 UK Championship and the 1998 German Masters. He defeated Fernandez 10–3. "That performance wasn't the best in the world, though, to be fair, I wasn't under any real pressure," O'Sullivan said afterward.

=== Second round ===
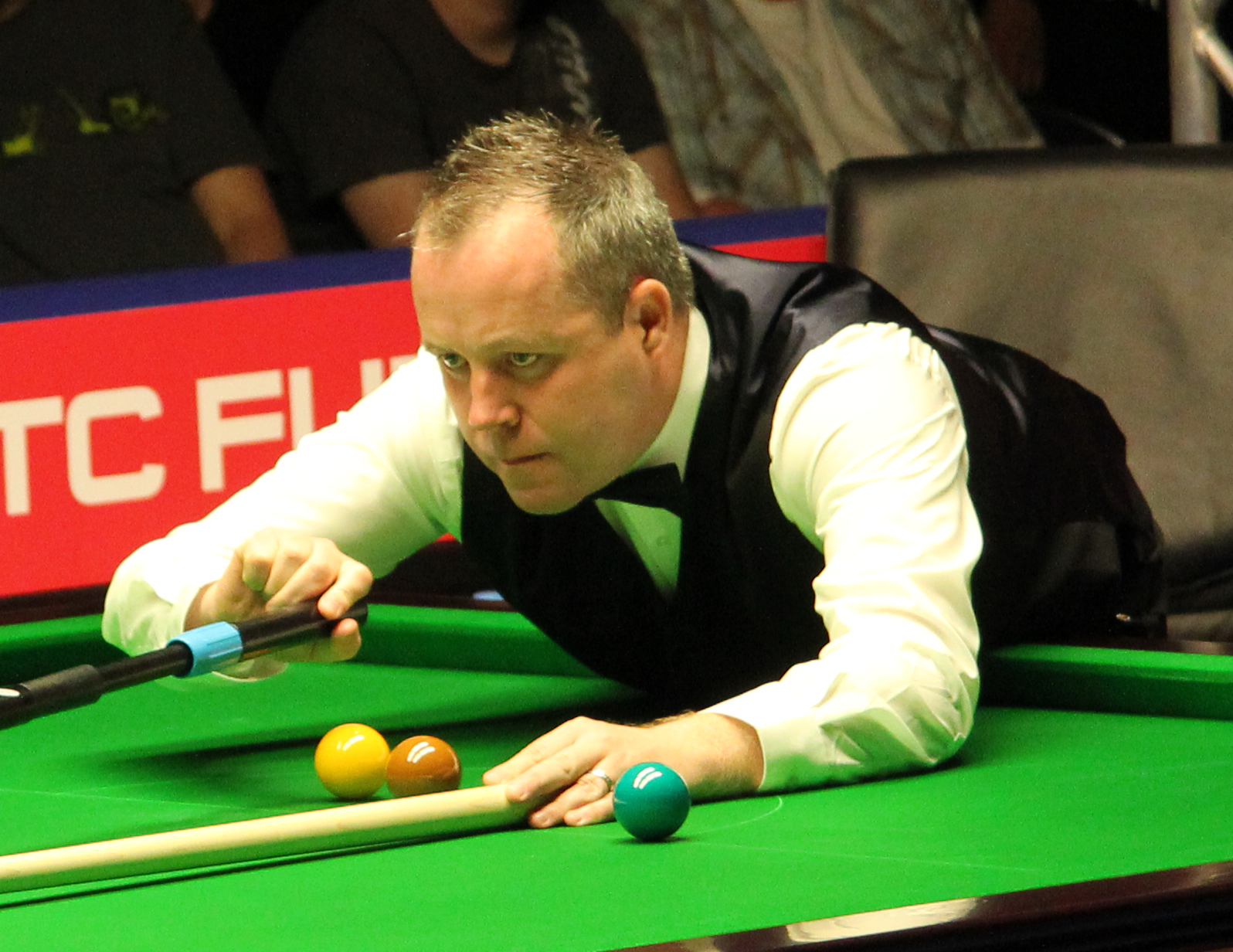
John Higgins (pictured in 2011) won all eight frames of the first session both in his second-round and quarter-final matches. He lost to Mark Williams in the semi-finals and became the ninth first-time champion who failed to defend his title since the tournament moved to the Crucible Theatre in 1977.

The second round was played as the best of 25 frames, held over three sessions, between 22 and 26 April. The match between Small and Parrott produced several lengthy frames, one lasting an hour, another 47 minutes and two 43 minutes. Small tied the scores at 12–12 with a 131 break to force a decider, which Parrott won with a break of 68. "I just couldn't get rid of him. I should have won 13–10 but he dug in and made a fantastic century after looking a bit shaky. I know Chris [Small] is slow but he is still a very good player and difficult to play against," Parrott said. "This is the third time I've played John [Parrott] and I've lost in the decider all three [times]. I can't play fast, if I did I would miss all the time. I can't change my game," Small replied. After this defeat, Small lost his place in the top 16, which went to White.

Higgins made back-to-back century breaks of 104 and 108 to build an 8–0 advantage over King in the first session. King replied with two successive century breaks of his own, but Higgins made further breaks of 84, 77, 75, 62 and 51 as he won the match 13–4. Stevens made breaks of 79, 73, 72, 62, 60 and 53 as he took a 6–2 lead over Drago. Drago won four of the next six, but Stevens later took three consecutive frames to win 13–8. Bond led Doherty 10–6 and 11–10, but Doherty won three frames in a row to secure victory.

Wattana led Hendry 2–1, but Hendry made breaks of 74, 65 and 64 as he moved into a 4–2 lead. Wattana won the seventh frame. In frame eight, Wattana missed the final blue. Hendry potted blue and pink, but then missed the black, which Wattana potted to tie the scores at 4–4. In frame 19, Hendry attempted a maximum break, but the break ended at 80. He went on to win 13–7. "Every time I win here [at the Crucible] I think that's enough, but when I return I want to win it again and it's no different this year," Hendry said. O'Sullivan was 5–3 ahead of Perry, who recovered to tie the scores at 6–6, but O'Sullivan won three of the last four frames of the second session to lead 9–7. O'Sullivan went on to win 13–8. "I felt more confident in this match than I have done for maybe six years and I'm much happier with any form," O'Sullivan said.

Aided by breaks of 49, 89 and 128, Lee won the first three frames against McManus. McManus won the fourth. In the fifth, McManus required snookers, but Lee went in-off and McManus took advantage of a free ball to win the frame. Further breaks of 87 and 104 gave Lee a four-frame advantage at the end of the first session. Lee extended his lead to seven frames at 9–2 and went on to win 13–7. "I feel I can win this championship, no problem," Lee said. Walker was tied with Williams at 6–6, but Williams ended the first day of play 9–7 ahead. Williams, who made breaks of 123, 88, 83, 62, 55 and 52 during the match, took all four frames played in the third session to win 13–7. "I have as good a chance as anyone here. My form can hardly improve all that much on what I have so far achieved this season," he claimed.

=== Quarter-finals ===
The quarter-finals were played as the best of 25 frames, held over three sessions, between 27 and 28 April. Higgins faced Lee. For a second consecutive match, Higgins won all eight frames in the first session. In the second session, the first six frames were shared and Lee then won the remaining two of the session to reduce the deficit to six at 5–11. Lee then made a 110 break to win frame 17, but Higgins made a century break of his own as he won 13–6.

O'Sullivan faced Parrott, who was making his 11th appearance in the World Championship quarter-finals. O'Sullivan led 3–1. Parrott made a century of 133 to win frame five, but O'Sullivan made breaks of 88, 52, 85, 70 and 120 to win the next five frames and lead 8–2. Parrott won the next with a break of 79, but O'Sullivan produced a century of 105 to go 9–3 in front and went on to win 13–9. "This was as good a result as I've ever had considering the stage we were on and the fact that John has been my bogey man for such a long time. He even gave me a 13–3 w[h]upping here five years ago," O'Sullivan said, referring to the 1994 World Championship. Parrott praised O'Sullivan, stating: "People say it's a travesty that Jimmy White has never won the world title. But it would be an even bigger one if Ronnie [O'Sullivan] never wins it. For pure natural talent and ability he is the best that ever wielded the cue. He just floats around the table pinging balls in from everywhere."

In a repeat of one of the previous year's semi-finals, Williams faced Doherty. Williams made breaks of 71, 76, 78 and 82 as he won seven of the first eight frames. Doherty recovered to trail by four frames at 8–12, but Williams clinched victory with a break of 97. "The damage was done during the first eight frames when Mark [Williams] hit a purple patch. He is a tough player who is difficult to stop and has a good chance of winning," Doherty said. Hendry won the first five frames against Stevens, making a break of 109 in frame five. Stevens then won two consecutive frames, making a century break of his own. Hendry led 8–2 and 10–3, and made another century break as he secured a 13–5 win. "I have proved I am far from being a spent force and some of my clearances were vintage Hendry. I just have to score a little heavier, otherwise every aspect of my game is good," Hendry claimed.

=== Semi-finals ===
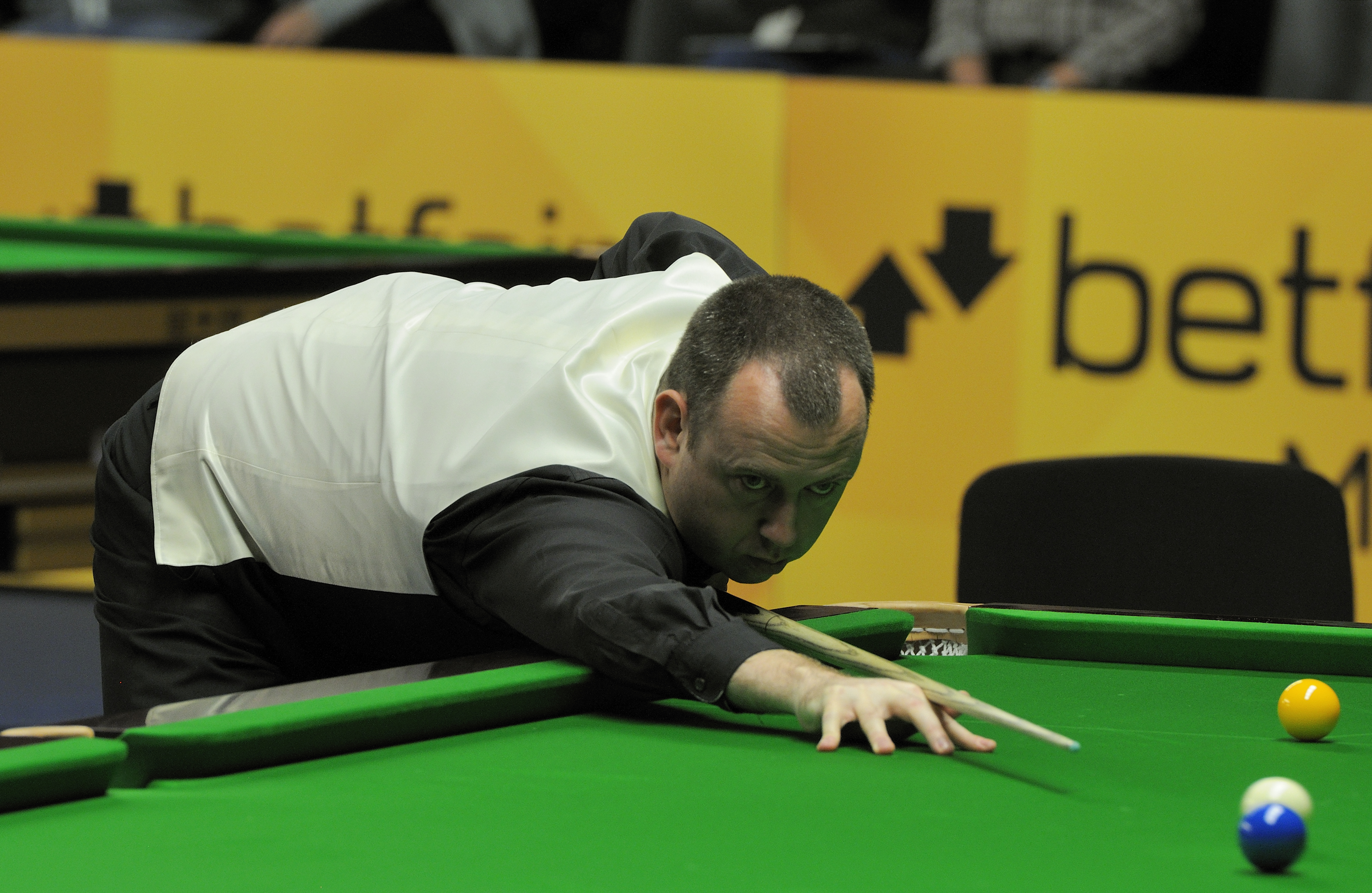
Mark Williams (pictured in 2013) defeated John Higgins 17–10 to reach the final of the World Championship for the first time in his career.

The semi-finals were played as the best of 33 frames, held over four sessions, between 29 April and 1 May. Higgins faced Williams. "It will be a massive battle and I'm sure Mark [Williams] will bring the best out of me. I will have to be on top form to win, though I reckon I'm a better player now than I was this time last year. I also believe I'm the one to beat, but I suppose the other three [semi-finalists] are saying the same," Higgins said in the build-up to the semi-final. Higgins made a 72 break to win the first frame. After breaks of 104 and 101 by Williams and 126 by Higgins, the scores were tied at 3–3. Two consecutive half-centuries gave Williams the lead, but Higgins made a century break as he tied the scores again. During this break, Higgins alerted the referee, Alan Chamberlain, to droplets of water falling on the table. Play was stopped and the table covered to avoid any damage. Play resumed after twenty minutes. The scores were also level at 6–6, 7–7 and 8–8. Williams then won four consecutive frames and went on to secure a 17–10 victory. Higgins's defeat made him the ninth first-time champion who failed to defend his title since the tournament moved to the Crucible Theatre in 1977, succumbing to what has been called the 'Crucible curse'. "That's the best anyone has ever played against me. I did feel intimidated because I was missing some long pots and I knew if I missed, Mark [Williams] wouldn't. It made me get uptight as well. It's not the worst moment of my career but I won't watch the final. It's too hurtful," Higgins said.

In the second semi-final, Hendry faced O'Sullivan. "Ronnie [O'Sullivan] is a match for anyone if his head and attitude are right. He is probably the most talented player in the world, but he does make mistakes and at this stage it is how you punish those mistakes that counts," Hendry said ahead of the match. Hendry made breaks of 126, 82 and 86 to lead 3–0, with O'Sullivan still to pot a ball. O'Sullivan won the fourth frame with a break of 78, but Hendry extended his lead to 6–1. O'Sullivan then won five frames in a row to tie the scores, making breaks of 67, 122 and 135. The match was also level at 7–7 and 10–10. Four consecutive century breaks, two by each player, followed. One of them was a maximum attempt by O'Sullivan, who missed the last pink ball to the middle pocket. O'Sullivan made a 70 break in the 25th frame to take the lead at 13–12 for the first time in the semi-final, but Hendry then won five consecutive frames for a 17–13 victory. Clive Everton praised the match as "one of the best" ever in the World Championship.

=== Final ===
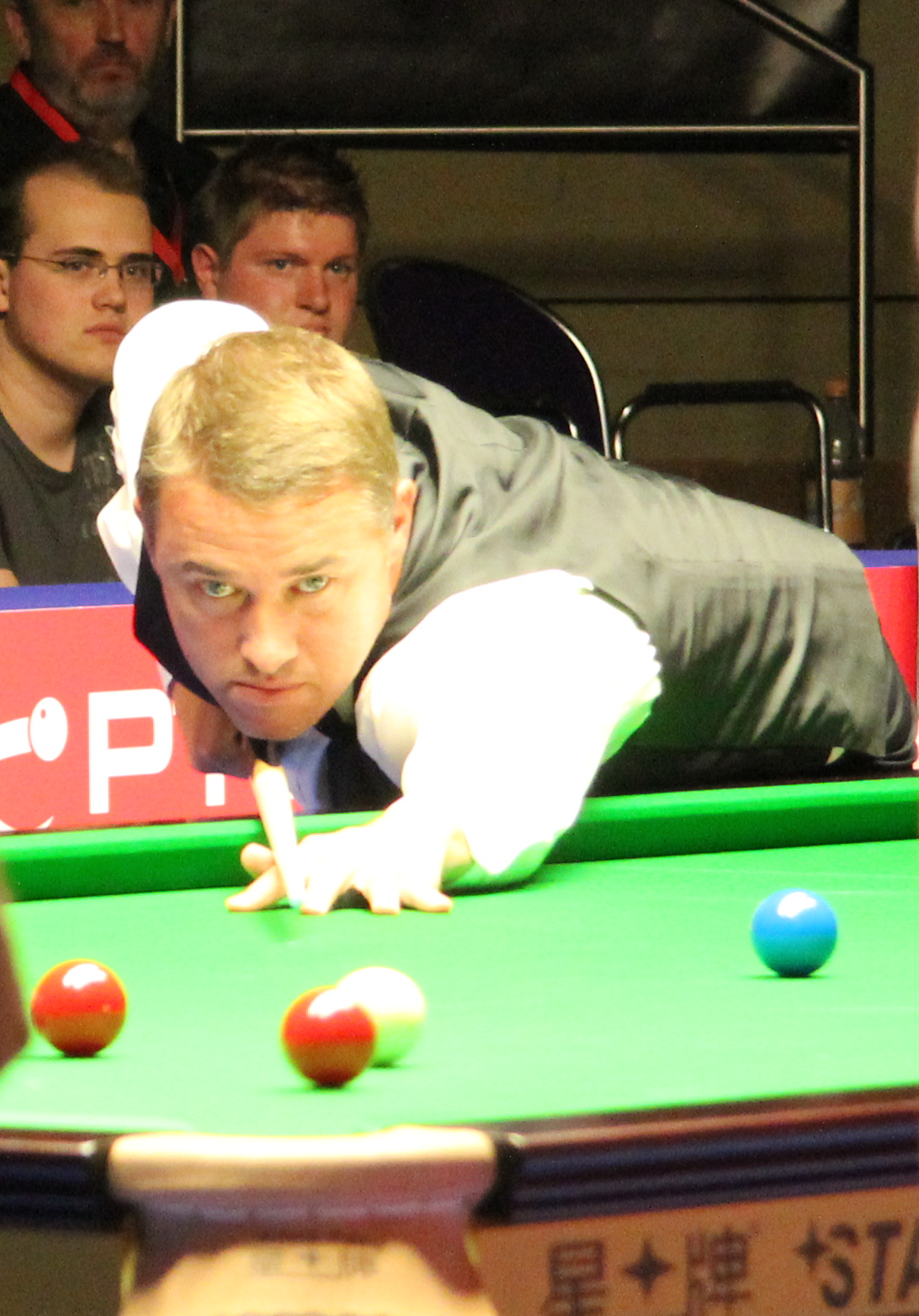
Stephen Hendry (pictured in 2011) defeated Mark Williams 18–11 to claim a seventh world title, a modern-era record, superseding the six titles won by both Ray Reardon and Steve Davis.

The final was played as the best of 35 frames, held over four sessions, on 2 and 3 May, between Williams and Hendry. Hendry was playing in his eighth world final, having previously won six titles and been runner-up once, while Williams contested the final of the event for the first time. Williams had won the three major finals the two had contested before, including the 1998 Masters on a re-spotted black in the deciding frame. "Mark [Williams] has become something of an annoyance to me as I have such a poor record against him. I have also been watching him here and he has been awesome," Hendry said ahead of the match. On their way to the final of the World Championship, Hendry had lost 33 frames and Williams 30. Referee Colin Brinded officiated the match.

Hendry took the first four frames, making breaks of 62, 98 and 77. Williams won the fifth frame, but another half-century gave Hendry a 5–1 lead. Williams won the last two frames of the session, making a break of 86 in the last, to leave Hendry 5–3 ahead. In the second session, Hendry made breaks of 77 and 76 as he restored a four-frame lead at 7–3. The following two frames were shared, with Hendry compiling a 132 break. Williams won frames 13 and 14, but Hendry took the last two frames of the session, making a break of 92 to lead 10–6 overnight.

In the third session, Williams made breaks of 85 and 72 as he reduced Hendry's lead to 10–8. The following two frames were shared, but Hendry then made breaks of 106, 55 and 53 to win the remaining four frames of the session, which he ended with a 15–9 lead. In the fourth and final session, Hendry made breaks of 66 and 62 as he moved one frame from victory at 17–9. Williams won frame 27 with an 89 break and also won frame 28. In the next frame, Williams led by 40 points when he missed a red, allowing Hendry to win the frame and match with an 88 break, completing an 18–11 victory.

Hendry won a record seventh world title, superseding the six world titles won by both Ray Reardon and Davis, making him the most successful player in the World Championship during the modern era. "This is worth more to me than [my] other six championships put together. This is my finest hour in snooker without a doubt. I've been in the doldrums for a couple of years and wondered if I would ever win another title," Hendry said afterwards. He said he did not think he would have been able to win the World Championship again if not for Frank Callan's coaching. It was Hendry's 31st ranking event win. He earned £230,000, while Williams received £135,000 as runner-up. "There was nothing left in the tank in the last session. I was done for. But it's still an achievement to get this far. Stephen [Hendry] played too strongly for me all through the match," Williams admitted.

Brendan Cooper wrote in Deep Pockets: Snooker and the Meaning of Life (2023) that after winning in 1999, Hendry was "able to look back on an epoch of domination even more complete than Davis'. In snooker history, the 1990s are quite simply Hendry's property: the entire decade is a boar's head, handing on his living room wall."

== Main draw ==
The draw for the main tournament is shown below. The numbers in parentheses after the players' names denote the seedings for the 16 seeded players. The match winners are shown in bold.

**Round 1 (Last 32)**; Best of 19 frames
17 April
**John Higgins (SCO) (1)**	**10**
Gerard Greene (NIR)	2
19 & 20 April
**Mark King (ENG) (16)**	**10**
Darren Morgan (WAL)	8
21 & 22 April
**Stephen Lee (ENG) (9)**	**10**
John Lardner (SCO)	7
21 April
**Alan McManus (SCO) (8)**	**10**
Jimmy White (ENG)	7
18 & 19 April
**Mark Williams (WAL) (5)**	**10**
Ian McCulloch (ENG)	4
18 & 19 April
Alain Robidoux (CAN) (12)	6
**Nick Walker (ENG)**	**10**
17 & 18 April
**Nigel Bond (ENG) (13)**	**10**
Dominic Dale (WAL)	6
18 & 19 April
**Ken Doherty (IRL) (4)**	**10**
Steve James (ENG)	3
21 & 22 April
**Ronnie O'Sullivan (ENG) (3)**	**10**
Leo Fernandez (IRL)	3
20 & 21 April
Steve Davis (ENG) (14)	9
**Joe Perry (ENG)**	**10**
17 & 18 April
Anthony Hamilton (ENG) (11)	9
**Chris Small (SCO)**	**10**
17 & 18 April
**John Parrott (ENG) (6)**	**10**
Terry Murphy (NIR)	8
19 April
Peter Ebdon (ENG) (7)	7
**Matthew Stevens (WAL)**	**10**
17 & 18 April
**Tony Drago (MLT) (10)**	**10**
Fergal O'Brien (IRL)	4
19 & 20 April
**James Wattana (THA) (15)**	**10**
Marco Fu (HKG)	8
20 & 21 April
**Stephen Hendry (SCO) (2)**	**10**
Paul Hunter (ENG)	8

**Round 2 (Last 16)**; Best of 25 frames
22, 23 & 24 April
**(Scotland) John Higgins (1)**	**13**
(England) Mark King (16)	4
25 & 26 April
**(England) Stephen Lee (9)**	**13**
(Scotland) Alan McManus (8)	7
24, 25 & 26 April
**(Wales) Mark Williams (5)**	**13**
(England) Nick Walker	7
23 & 24 April
(England) Nigel Bond (13)	11
**(Republic of Ireland) Ken Doherty (4)**	**13**
24, 25 & 26 April
**(England) Ronnie O'Sullivan (3)**	**13**
(England) Joe Perry	8
22 & 23 April
(Scotland) Chris Small	12
**(England) John Parrott (6)**	**13**
23 & 24 April
**(Wales) Matthew Stevens**	**13**
(Malta) Tony Drago (10)	8
25 & 26 April
(Thailand) James Wattana (15)	7
**(Scotland) Stephen Hendry (2)**	**13**

**Quarter-finals**; Best of 25 frames
27 & 28 April
**(Scotland) John Higgins (1)**	**13**
(England) Stephen Lee (9)	6
27 & 28 April
**(Wales) Mark Williams (5)**	**13**
(Republic of Ireland) Ken Doherty (4)	9
27 & 28 April
**(England) Ronnie O'Sullivan (3)**	**13**
(England) John Parrott (6)	9
27 & 28 April
(Wales) Matthew Stevens	5
**(Scotland) Stephen Hendry (2)**	**13**

**Semi-finals**; Best of 33 frames
29, 30 April & 1 May
(Scotland) John Higgins (1)	10
**(Wales) Mark Williams (5)**	**17**
29, 30 April & 1 May
(England) Ronnie O'Sullivan (3)	13
**(Scotland) Stephen Hendry (2)**	**17**

**Final**; Best of 35 frames
2 & 3 May
(Wales) Mark Williams (5)	11
**(Scotland) Stephen Hendry (2)**	**18**

=== Final: frame scores ===
Final: (Best of 35 frames) Crucible Theatre, Sheffield, 2 and 3 May 1999; Referee: Colin Brinded
Mark Williams (5); Wales				11–**18**			**Stephen Hendry** (2); Scotland			
Session 1: 3–**5** (3–**5**)
Frame	1	2	3	4	5	6	7	8	9	10
Williams	47	6	16	60 (56)	**75**†	16	**73**†	**92**† (86)	N/A	N/A
Hendry	**82**† (62)	**120**† (98)	**51**†	**77**† (77)	0	**101**† (86)	16	24	N/A	N/A
Session 2: 3–**5** (6–**10**)
Frame	1	2	3	4	5	6	7	8	9	10
Williams	24	15	**65**†	4	**75**† (64)	**67**†	22	23	N/A	N/A
Hendry	**77**† (77)	**76**† (76)	20	**133**† (132)	49	30	**64**†	**100**† (92)	N/A	N/A
Session 3: 3–**5** (9–**15**)
Frame	1	2	3	4	5	6	7	8	9	10
Williams	**85**† (85)	**72**† (72)	0	**84**†	10	13	62	48	N/A	N/A
Hendry	51	32	**78**† (78)	29	**106**† (106)	**71**† (55)	**75**† (53)	**60**†	N/A	N/A
Session 4: 2–**3** (11–**18**)
Frame	1	2	3	4	5	6	7	8	9	10
Williams	45	29	**89**† (89)	**73**†	40	N/A	N/A	N/A	N/A	N/A
Hendry	**72**† (66)	**71**† (62)	0	67	**88**† (88)	N/A	N/A	N/A	N/A	N/A
(frame 27) 89				Highest break			**132** (frame 12)			
0				Century breaks			**2**			
6				50+ breaks			**15**			
(Scotland) Stephen Hendry wins the 1999 World Snooker Championship † = Winner of frame

== Qualifying results ==
There were five pre-qualifying rounds and nine qualifying rounds. The final three qualifying rounds were held at Telford International Centre from 29 March to 2 April.

Round 3 Best of 19 frames
(Wales) Ryan Day	10
(England) Neil Selman	5
(England) Barry Hawkins	10
(England) Sean Lanigan	3
(Belgium) Bjorn Haneveer	10
(England) Steve Harrison	5
(Republic of Ireland) Colm Gilcreest	10
(Republic of Ireland) David McDonnell	4
(England) Damian Massey	10
(England) Grant Conquest	6
(England) Stuart Bingham	10
(Republic of Ireland) Joe Delaney	5
(Finland) Robin Hull	10
(England) Brian Rowswell	8
(England) Nick Dyson	10
(Thailand) Tai Pichit	5
(England) Barry Pinches	10
(England) Jeff Cundy	3
(Iceland) Kristjan Helgason	10
(England) Ali Carter	6
(England) Rory McLeod	10
(England) Marc Farnsworth	7
(England) Jamie Bodle	10
(England) Richard Jones	8
(England) Malcolm Bilclough	10
(Germany) Mike Henson	7
(England) Shailesh Jogia	10
(Canada) Bob Chaperon	6
(China) Guo Hua	10
(England) Stuart Mann	3
(Wales) Ian Sargeant	10
(England) Surinder Gill	6
(Australia) Neil Robertson	10
(Australia) Johl Younger	8
(Scotland) Stephen Maguire	10
(England) Adrian Gunnell	6
(England) Mark Johnston-Allen	10
(England) John Burns	6
(England) Eddie Barker	10
(Singapore) Keith Boon	8
(Scotland) Gary Thomson	10
(Northern Ireland) Dermot McGlinchey	7
(Scotland) Geoff Dunn	10
(England) Paul Cavney	3
(England) Avtar Sohanpal	10
(England) Mike Dunn	9
(Belgium) Patrick Delsemme	10
(England) Darren Hackeson	6
(Canada) Kirk Stevens	10
(England) Gary Lees	8
(England) John Whitty	10
(Cyprus) Mehmet Husnu	8
(England) Les Dodd	10
(England) John Giles	8
(Malaysia) Sam Chong	10
(England) Paul Clarke	3
(Wales) Gareth Chilcott	10
(England) Simon Parker	4
(England) Mike Hallett	10
(England) Andy Neck	4
(England) Craig Roper	10
(England) Mark Miller	5
(England) Matt Wilson	10
(England) Stuart Reardon	5

Round 4 Best of 19 frames
(England) Paul Davison	10
(Wales) Ryan Day	6
(England) Barry Hawkins	10
(Republic of Ireland) Micky Roughan	3
(Belgium) Bjorn Haneveer	10
(England) Adrian Rosa	3
(Republic of Ireland) Colm Gilcreest	10
(England) Eddie Manning	4
(England) Damian Massey	10
(Wales) Philip Williams	8
(England) Stuart Bingham	10
(Scotland) Alan Burnett	6
(Finland) Robin Hull	10
(Republic of Ireland) Stephen Murphy	4
(England) Nick Dyson	10
(England) Oliver King	9
(England) Barry Pinches	10
(England) Jason Weston	6
(Iceland) Kristjan Helgason	10
(England) Simon Bedford	8
(England) Rory McLeod	10
(England) Barry Mapstone	7
(England) Nick Terry	10
(England) Jamie Bodle	6
(Scotland) Chris Shade	10
(England) Malcolm Bilclough	7
(England) Shailesh Jogia	10
(England) Jason Wallace	4
(England) Craig Harrison	10
(China) Guo Hua	8
(England) Munraj Pal	10
(Wales) Ian Sargeant	8
(Republic of Ireland) Leo Fernandez	10
(Australia) Neil Robertson	5
(Scotland) Stephen Maguire	10
(Wales) Mark Fenton	9
(England) Mark Johnston-Allen	10
(England) Anthony Bolsover	5
(England) Nigel Gilbert	10
(England) Eddie Barker	9
(Northern Ireland) Patrick Wallace	10
(Scotland) Gary Thomson	8
(Scotland) Paul McPhillips	10
(Scotland) Geoff Dunn	9
(England) Tony Knowles	10
(England) Avtar Sohanpal	7
(Belgium) Patrick Delsemme	10
(Scotland) Hugh Abernethy	5
(Malta) Joe Grech	10
(Canada) Kirk Stevens	6
(England) John Whitty	10
(Wales) James Reynolds	8
(England) Darryn Walker	10
(England) Les Dodd	8
(England) Paul Sweeny	10
(Malaysia) Sam Chong	5
(Wales) Gareth Chilcott	10
(Wales) Steve Newbury	7
(England) Robert Milkins	10
(England) Mike Hallett	7
(Scotland) David McLellan	10
(England) Craig Roper	7
(England) Michael Holt	10
(England) Matt Wilson	7

Round 5 Best of 19 frames
(England) Lee Richardson	10
(England) Paul Davison	4
(England) Alfie Burden	10
(England) Barry Hawkins	4
(Belgium) Bjorn Haneveer	10
(England) Stefan Mazrocis	9
(England) Gary Ponting	10
(Republic of Ireland) Colm Gilcreest	7
(Scotland) John Lardner	10
(England) Damian Massey	4
(England) Stuart Bingham	10
(Scotland) Martin Dziewialtowski	6
(Finland) Robin Hull	10
(Australia) Peter McCullagh	8
(England) John Read	10
(England) Nick Dyson	4
(England) Barry Pinches	10
(Wales) Anthony Davies	2
(England) Troy Shaw	10
(Iceland) Kristjan Helgason	7
(England) Nick Walker	10
(England) Rory McLeod	6
(England) Nick Terry	10
(England) Stuart Pettman	6
(Scotland) Chris Shade	10
(England) Wayne Brown	2
(England) Leigh Griffin	10
(England) Shailesh Jogia	5
(England) Craig Harrison	10
(Wales) Wayne Jones	7
(Scotland) Craig MacGillivray	10
(England) Munraj Pal	7
(Republic of Ireland) Leo Fernandez	10
(England) Steve Judd	5
(Scotland) Stephen Maguire	10
(England) Sean Storey	8
(England) Joe Perry	10
(England) Mark Johnston-Allen	4
(England) Nigel Gilbert	10
(England) Ian Brumby	7
(England) David Finbow	10
(Northern Ireland) Patrick Wallace	3
(Scotland) Paul McPhillips	10
(England) Jimmy Michie	6
(England) Tony Knowles	10
(Scotland) Marcus Campbell	5
(Belgium) Patrick Delsemme	10
(England) Karl Burrows	9
(Malta) Joe Grech	10
(England) Karl Payne	6
(Republic of Ireland) Stephen O'Connor	10
(England) John Whitty	8
(England) Chris Scanlon	10
(England) Darryn Walker	9
(England) Paul Sweeny	10
(England) Mark Bennett	6
(Wales) Gareth Chilcott	10
(Scotland) Graham Horne	6
(England) Robert Milkins	10
(England) Mark Gray	6
(England) Matthew Couch	10
(Scotland) David McLellan	5
(England) Michael Holt	10
(England) Darren Clarke	7

Round 6 Best of 19 frames
(England) Stuart Bingham	10
(Australia) Shawn Budd	4
(Finland) Robin Hull	10
(Canada) Tom Finstad	0
(England) Barry Pinches	10
(Mauritius) Richard Somauroo	3
(Scotland) Stephen Maguire	10
(Thailand) Phaitoon Phonbun	7
(Belgium) Mario Geudens	10
(Belgium) Patrick Delsemme	8
(Hong Kong) Marco Fu	10
(Wales) Gareth Chilcott	0

Round 7 Best of 19 frames
(Northern Ireland) Gerard Greene	10
(England) Lee Richardson	3
(England) Alfie Burden	10
(New Zealand) Dene O'Kane	4
(England) Nick Pearce	10
(Belgium) Bjorn Haneveer	7
(England) Gary Ponting	10
(England) David Roe	5
(Scotland) John Lardner	10
(England) Neal Foulds	5
(Australia) Quinten Hann	10
(England) Stuart Bingham	8
(England) Joe Johnson	10
(Finland) Robin Hull	7
(England) Dean Reynolds	10
(England) John Read	4
(England) Ian McCulloch	10
(England) Barry Pinches	9
(England) Peter Lines	10
(England) Troy Shaw	8
(England) Nick Walker	10
(Northern Ireland) Dennis Taylor	3
(England) Rod Lawler	10
(England) Nick Terry	3
(England) Mark Davis	10
(Scotland) Chris Shade	4
(England) Leigh Griffin	10
(Wales) Lee Walker	6
(England) Steve James	10
(England) Craig Harrison	5
(Scotland) Craig MacGillivray	10
(Wales) Tony Chappel	8
(Republic of Ireland) Leo Fernandez	10
(England) Paul Davies	9
(England) Bradley Jones	10
(Scotland) Stephen Maguire	7
(England) Joe Perry	10
(Republic of Ireland) Mick Price	8
(England) Nigel Gilbert	10
(Northern Ireland) Joe Swail	9
(England) David Finbow	10
(Northern Ireland) Jason Prince	5
(Scotland) Drew Henry	10
(Scotland) Paul McPhillips	6
(Republic of Ireland) Michael Judge	10
(England) Tony Knowles	4
(Belgium) Mario Geudens	10
(England) Tony Jones	6
(England) Jonathan Birch	10
(Malta) Joe Grech	2
(Republic of Ireland) Stephen O'Connor	10
(England) David Gray	5
(England) Chris Scanlon	10
(Pakistan) Shokat Ali	7
(England) Paul Sweeny	10
(England) Willie Thorne	0
(Hong Kong) Marco Fu	10
(England) Jason Ferguson	1
(England) Robert Milkins	10
(England) Karl Broughton	6
(Scotland) Euan Henderson	10
(England) Matthew Couch	6
(England) Paul Wykes	10
(England) Michael Holt	8

Round 8 Best of 19 frames
(Northern Ireland) Gerard Greene	10
(England) Alfie Burden	8
(England) Nick Pearce	10
(England) Gary Ponting	7
(Scotland) John Lardner	10
(Australia) Quinten Hann	8
(England) Joe Johnson	5
(England) Dean Reynolds	10
(England) Ian McCulloch	10
(England) Peter Lines	6
(England) Nick Walker	10
(England) Rod Lawler	8
(England) Mark Davis	5
(England) Leigh Griffin	10
(England) Steve James	10
(Scotland) Craig MacGillivray	5
(Republic of Ireland) Leo Fernandez	10
(England) Bradley Jones	9
(England) Joe Perry	10
(England) Nigel Gilbert	6
(England) David Finbow	10
(Scotland) Drew Henry	8
(Republic of Ireland) Michael Judge	10
(Belgium) Mario Geudens	6
(England) Jonathan Birch	10
(Republic of Ireland) Stephen O'Connor	7
(England) Chris Scanlon	10
(England) Paul Sweeny	5
(Hong Kong) Marco Fu	10
(England) Robert Milkins	4
(Scotland) Euan Henderson	10
(England) Paul Wykes	8

Round 9 Best of 19 frames
(Northern Ireland) Gerard Greene	10
(England) Andy Hicks	2
(Wales) Darren Morgan	10
(England) Nick Pearce	9
(Scotland) John Lardner	10
(England) Martin Clark	2
(England) Jimmy White	10
(England) Dean Reynolds	7
(England) Ian McCulloch	10
(England) Gary Wilkinson	9
(England) Nick Walker	10
(Scotland) Jamie Burnett	6
(Wales) Dominic Dale	10
(England) Leigh Griffin	6
(England) Steve James	10
(Scotland) Billy Snaddon	6
(Republic of Ireland) Leo Fernandez	10
(England) Brian Morgan	5
(England) Joe Perry	10
(England) Dave Harold	7
(Scotland) Chris Small	10
(England) David Finbow	2
(Northern Ireland) Terry Murphy	10
(Republic of Ireland) Michael Judge	9
(Wales) Matthew Stevens	10
(England) Jonathan Birch	6
(Republic of Ireland) Fergal O'Brien	10
(England) Chris Scanlon	7
(Hong Kong) Marco Fu	10
(Scotland) Graeme Dott	4
(England) Paul Hunter	10
(Scotland) Euan Henderson	5

== Century breaks ==
A total of 53 century breaks were made during the main stage of the tournament. The highest break was a 142 compiled by John Higgins.

- 142, 132, 127, 126, 124, 108, 104, 104, 100 – John Higgins
- 140, 123, 109, 104, 101, 100 – Mark Williams
- 137, 108 – Tony Drago
- 137 – Steve James
- 136, 130, 110 – James Wattana
- 135, 134, 122, 120, 110, 105, 100 – Ronnie O'Sullivan
- 133 – John Parrott
- 132, 126, 109, 108, 106, 104, 104, 101 – Stephen Hendry
- 131, 114 – Chris Small
- 128, 110, 104 – Stephen Lee
- 124, 120, 100 – Matthew Stevens
- 122 – Dominic Dale
- 120, 109 – Joe Perry
- 108, 103 – Anthony Hamilton
- 104 – Ken Doherty
- 103, 103 – Mark King
