= John Lardner =

Scottish snooker player

Personal information
- Born: 10 May 1972 (age 54) Glasgow, Scotland

Sport
- Country: Scotland
- Sport: Snooker
- Professional: 1991–2001
- Highest ranking: 67 (2000/2001)
- Best ranking finish: Last 16 (x1)

John Lardner (born 10 May 1972 in Glasgow, Scotland) is a former professional snooker player. His best performance came in the 1999 World Snooker Championship, where he reached the last 32. He reached a peak world ranking of 67th in 2000–01.

== Early life ==
Lardner was born in Glasgow in 1973. He left school early to spend time practising snooker, confident that he could become a professional player. In 1988 Lardner won the Star of the Future award at a competition in Prestatyn.

== Professional career ==
Lardner turned professional in 1991. In the 1993–94 season, he reached the final of the Benson & Hedges Championship, losing 6–9 to Ronnie O'Sullivan.

In 1999, at the age of 26, Lardner reached the first round of the World Snooker Championship by defeating Neal Foulds, Quinten Hann and Martin Clark in the qualifying rounds. In his first round match against world number 9 Stephen Lee, Lardner trailed 3–9 before recovering to lose only 7–10. Despite the defeat, he described the Crucible Theatre as "the best place I've ever played snooker".

The following season, Lardner climbed to position 72 in the world rankings, and reached the first round of the UK Championship, losing to David Gray. He also achieved his best ranking tournament finish by reaching the last 16 of the Thailand Masters in March 2000, beating Fergal O'Brien in the last 32 before being defeated by Ken Doherty. However, he was defeated in the qualifying rounds of the World Championship to Icelandic player Kristján Helgason. His world ranking climbed to 67 for the 2000/2001 season.

== Tournament Wins ==
=== Non-Ranking Wins: (1) ===
- WPBSA Minor Tour - Event 3 – 1995
