= Frank Callan =

English snooker coach and player

- Born: c. 1923
- Died: 2016 (aged 93)
- Occupation: Snooker coach
- Known for: Frank Callan's Snooker Clinic

Frank Callan (c. 1923 – 2016) was a fishmonger who became known as a snooker coach to leading players including Steve Davis, Terry Griffiths, John Parrott, Allison Fisher, Doug Mountjoy and Stephen Hendry. He took up snooker as a youngster, but did not play for about ten years after joining the army in 1940, after which he resumed the game and won some local tournaments.

Callan took an interest in the mechanics of snooker, and started coaching in the 1970s. He disagreed with the prescriptive techniques of Joe Davis and Billiards and Snooker Control Council chief coach Jack Karnehm, and argued that techniques should be tailored to players. He advocated the use of a standard routine for each shot. Steve Davis worked with Callan from the late 1970s, and won six World Snooker Championships in the 1980s. In 1989, Mountjoy became the only player apart from Steve Davis to win successive ranking titles. Callan was acknowledged as the leading snooker coach of his time by Snooker Scene magazine and in The Times. His book Frank Callan's Snooker Clinic, subtitled Snooker – the Modern Way, co-authored by John Dee, was published in 1989 by Partridge Press.

== Early life and career ==
Callan, born c. 1923 was a fish merchant. Having played snooker as a youth, he joined the army in 1940, and did not play the game again until he was 27. He made his first century break when he was 32.

Callan won the Fleetwood and District Amateur Snooker Championship in 1950, the first time he entered the competition. The following year, he lost in the quarter-finals, and in 1952 his quarter-final opponent was awarded a walkover when Callan opted to play in a Fylde championship match scheduled for the same night. In October 1952, receiving a 21-point start in each frame, he lost 1–4 to Joe Davis in a match staged for charity. Callan regained the Fleetwood and District title in 1953, and retained it in 1954. His most notable tournament victory was the North West [of England] Amateur Championship.

== Coaching ==
Callan took an interest in the mechanics of snooker, and started coaching in the 1970s. His coaching focused on technical aspects, not psychological, and was based around the principle that each player should use a stance that was appropriate for them rather than trying to match an idealised position. Joe Davis's books on technique were highly regarded in snooker circles, but Callan had discussed snooker techniques with him on a number of occasions, and came to believe that Davis's style of play, which was partly due to a weak left eye, would not work for all players. Callan advocated using a long backswing when using a cue, with a pause before striking the ball during which the player should focus on the object ball rather than the cue ball. He also recommended using a standard drill (or routine) for each shot. Journalist and author Gordon Burn wrote in 1986 that Callan was renowned for being able to identify faults with a player's technique and help to rapidly rectify them. Callan told journalist Donald Trelford that the three key characteristics of a champion were "talent, dedication — and 'bottle'" (Note: "bottle" is used here in the sense of "nerve" or "courage")

Callan worked with many players, including Steve Davis, Terry Griffiths, John Parrott, Allison Fisher, Doug Mountjoy and Stephen Hendry. He was sometimes described in the press as a coach to Steve Davis, but Davis maintained that his own father, Bill Davis, was his coach, and Callan was an adviser. Callan worked with Davis after they met at the Commonwealth Sporting Club in Blackpool in the late 1970s; Callan was impressed that Davis was researching the quality of the various tables at the club before playing in a competition there. Davis would go on to win the World Snooker Championship six times between 1981 and 1989. Hendry won seven world titles between 1990 and 1999, and Parrott was champion in 1991. The 1979 world champion Griffiths started working with Callan from 1985, and regretted not having seen him earlier, finding that Callan was able to identify issues that Griffiths himself could not. However, a few years later Griffiths reduced his engagement with Callan, after they disagreed over issues such as the ideal length for Griffiths's cue action. Fisher was unbeaten in women's snooker from the 1984 Women's World Amateur Snooker Championship until the 1987 Women's World Championship. Six-time world champion Ray Reardon wrote in 1986 that "Only a couple of days with the Blackpool snooker 'mechanic' was enough to enable Allison to add 14 points per frame to her game."

Mountjoy won the 1988 UK Championship and the 1989 Classic to become the only player apart from Steve Davis to win successive ranking titles, and publicly thanked Callan for his coaching. After winning the UK title, Mountjoy said "Without Frank Callan, I would be nothing".

Callan, who Snooker Scene magazine described at the time as "long recognised by professionals as snooker's leading coach", committed to work only with players managed by Ian Doyle's Cuemasters company, including Hendry, for the 1991–92 snooker season. Hendry stopped working with Callan from the end of the 1997–98 snooker season until February 1999. After winning a record seventh World Snooker Championship in May 1999, Hendry acknowledged Callan's help, saying "I've had help from all kinds of people this season but he is the man for me. He knows my game inside out ... There have been times in matches here where I've not played well but then gone into the interval and Frank has said one thing and it's made all the difference." In The Times, Phil Yates wrote that "transformation" was due to the revival of his coaching partnership with Callan.

Burn wrote that "Anybody less guru-like than Frank Callan ... it is difficult to imagine." He described Callan as "Dour, cantankerous, impatient and blunt". Callan had failed the Billiards and Snooker Control Council (B&SCC) coaching course in 1980, and publicly disagreed with the B&SCC chief coach Jack Karnehm, who he felt tried to prescribe a single rather than a tailored approach to good technique. Karnehm countered that Callan had misinterpreted the aim of the B&SCC coaching approach, which was targeted at young players rather than established professionals.

Callan's own book, Frank Callan's Snooker Clinic, subtitled Snooker – the Modern Way, co-authored by John Dee, was published in 1989 by Partridge Press. According to snooker historian Clive Everton, who wrote a chapter about Callan in the book, Callan never sought a fee in return for his coaching. Everton wrote that "The Callan way is to find a technique for the body rather than try to mould the body unnaturally to a preconceived technique."

Callan was married and had two daughters. He died in 2016, aged 93. In 1990, Steve Acteson wrote in The Times that "If the leading players were asked to select the greatest coach in the game, they would invariably nominate Frank Callan." Everton called Callan "the father of modern coaching".
