= Len Ganley =

Snooker referee

Len Ganley MBE

Personal information
- Born: 27 April 1943 Lurgan, County Armagh, Northern Ireland
- Died: 28 August 2011 (aged 68) Lurgan, County Armagh, Northern Ireland

Sport
- Sport: Snooker

Leonard Ganley (27 April 1943 – 28 August 2011) was a Northern Irish snooker referee who refereed four World Snooker Championship finals between 1983 and 1993. Having taken up snooker aged nine, and worked as a chimney sweep, he moved to England with his wife and children in 1971 and worked as a milkman and bus driver.

Ganley took up refereeing snooker matches in 1976, on Ray Reardon's suggestion, after he had stepped in as a replacement referee for an exhibition match involving Reardon. Ganley gained his Grade A refereeing certificate in 1979, joined the Professional Referees Association the same year, and became a full-time referee in 1983. He refereed the world championship finals in 1983, 1987, 1990 and 1993.

Ganley retired from refereeing in 1999 and moved back to Lurgan. He had diabetes, and died on 28 August 2011, aged 68. He had been appointed MBE in 2000 in recognition of his charity work and for services to snooker.

== Early life and pre-refereeing career ==
Leonard Ganley was born on 27 April 1943 in Lurgan, County Armagh, Northern Ireland and was the youngest of eleven children: four boys and seven girls. The family lived in the village of Castle-Lane. His mother was a shop-keeper, and his father was a chimney sweep. Len Ganley recalled a "hard upbringing, [with] one salvation ...snooker". He took up snooker aged nine at the Catholic Association, where his brothers also played. He played snooker at a local league level and also refereed matches. He worked as a chimney sweep when he was 15. In 1971, he, with his wife Rosaline and their five children, visited England. They intended to spend a ten-day holiday with his sister in Burton-upon-Trent, but ended up staying long-term. Ganley and Rosaline had a sixth child after moving to England. He worked as a milkman and bus driver when he first arrived.

== Refereeing career ==
Ganley took up refereeing snooker matches in the UK in 1976 on Ray Reardon's suggestion, after he had stepped in as a replacement referee for an exhibition match involving Reardon. Ganley gained his Grade A refereeing certificate in 1979, joined the Professional Referees Association the same year, and became a full-time referee in 1983.

He refereed four World Snooker Championship finals: in 1983, 1987, 1990 and 1993. A career highlight was refereeing the 1983 UK Championship final between Alex Higgins and Steve Davis, which Higgins won after having trailed 0–7. He also refereed the fastest-ever fastest maximum break, which was made by Ronnie O'Sullivan against Mick Price in the first round of the 1997 World Championship. In 1985, he joined Steve Davis and Dennis Taylor as the referee for the 1985 China Masters, the first professional snooker event in China, which was watched by a television audience estimated to be between 300 million and 450 million people. He also toured countries including Singapore and Thailand with Matchroom Snooker, a sporting management and promotions company run by Barry Hearn, which Davis and Taylor were signed to.

Ganley weighed around 20 stones, and reaching 22 stones at his heaviest. Journalist Donald Trelford wrote in 1986 that Ganley "is the most visible, because he is the biggest, of the tournament referees. He gives the impression of being in charge of the whole building, not just the table". Ganley declared that referee should be unobtrusive, but players including Steve Davis and John Virgo felt that he enjoyed being the centre of attention.

Although a non-drinker, Ganley appeared in a Carling Black Label beer advertisement on TV in 1984, in which he crushed the cue ball with his gloved hand in a fictional match between Terry Griffiths and John Spencer, after Spencer had knocked the ball off the table and into the groin of Ganley. He was subsequently nicknamed "Ballcrusher". He was the subject of the Half Man Half Biscuit tribute song "The Len Ganley Stance". The band referred to him as the "Godfather of Punk" in the sleeve notes. He appeared in the pilot for the snooker-themed BBC1 game show Big Break with comedian Mike Reid as host, but the show was eventually made without either of them, with Jim Davidson and John Virgo hosting. At the 1989 World Snooker Championship, Ganley arranged the meeting between promoter Barry Hearn and boxer Chris Eubank that led to Hearn signing Eubank.

Ganley was actively involved in charitable causes, including fundraising for multiple sclerosis and cancer research. As part of the Snooker Golf Society, he helped raise funds for powered wheelchairs for children.

== Retirement and death ==
Ganley retired from refereeing in 1999 and moved back to Lurgan, where he took a coaching course and taught young players cue sports. His son Mike Ganley became a Tournament Director for the World Professional Billiards and Snooker Association.

He was appointed as a Member of the Most Excellent Order of the British Empire (MBE) in 2000 in recognition of his charity work and for services to snooker. Ganley was an alcoholic, but had given up drinking alcohol by 1986. He experienced a heart attack in 2002, and had long-term diabetes. He died at home on 28 August 2011, aged 68, after his health had declined over the preceding weeks. His family requested that people donated to the Paul Hunter Foundation rather than sending flowers. Steve Davis said: "Len did a very good job of being a referee and a personality at the same time... He was a great character off the table, but in the arena he was an excellent referee", and added that Ganley's aptitude at the game made him more insightful as a referee. As a player, Ganley won the Burton and South Derbyshire League twice, and his highest break was 136.
