= 1983 World Snooker Championship =

Professional snooker tournament

1983 Embassy World Snooker Championship
Tournament information
- Dates: 16 April – 2 May 1983
- Venue: Crucible Theatre
- City: Sheffield
- Country: England
- Organisation: WPBSA
- Format: Ranking event
- Winner's share: £30,000
- Highest break: Cliff Thorburn (CAN) (147)

Final
- Champion: Steve Davis (ENG)
- Runner-up: Cliff Thorburn (CAN)
- Score: 18–6

The 1983 World Snooker Championship (also known as the 1983 Embassy World Snooker Championship for the purposes of sponsorship) was a professional snooker tournament that took place between 16 April and 2 May 1983 at the Crucible Theatre in Sheffield, England. This was the third and final world ranking event of the 1982–83 snooker season following the 1982 Professional Players Tournament. Sixteen seeded players qualified directly for the event, with an additional sixteen players progressing through a two-round qualification round held at the Romiley Forum in Stockport, and Redwood Lodge in Bristol. The winner of the event received £30,000, and the tournament was sponsored by cigarette company Embassy.

Alex Higgins was the defending champion, having won the 1982 championship, but he lost 5–16 to Steve Davis in the semi-finals. Davis, the 1981 champion, won the event for the second time, defeating Cliff Thorburn 18–6 in the final. A total of 18 century breaks were made during the tournament. The highest was made by Thorburn in the fourth frame of his second round match against Terry Griffiths, where he compiled a maximum break of 147 points, becoming the first player to make such a break in a World Championship match.

== Overview ==
The World Snooker Championship is a professional snooker tournament and the game's official world championship. Developed in the late 19th century by British Army soldiers stationed in India, snooker was popular in the United Kingdom before being introduced to Europe and the Commonwealth. The sport is now played worldwide, especially in East and Southeast Asian nations such as China, Hong Kong and Thailand.

The 1983 Championship was organised and governed by the World Professional Billiards and Snooker Association (WPBSA). It featured 32 professional players competing in one-on-one single-elimination matches, played over several frames. The players were selected to take part using a combination of the world snooker rankings and a pre-tournament qualification tournament. The first World Championship, in 1927, was won by Joe Davis in a final at Camkin's Hall in Birmingham, England. Since 1977, the tournament has been held at the Crucible Theatre in Sheffield, England. The defending champion for 1983 was Alex Higgins, who defeated Ray Reardon 18–15 in the 1982 championship final. The tournament was sponsored by cigarette company Embassy, and broadcast on BBC television.

=== Prize fund ===
The winner of the event received a prize of £30,000, the highest amount ever awarded for a snooker tournament up to that point. A breakdown of prize money for this tournament is shown below:

- Winner: £30,000
- Runner up: £15,000
- Semi-finals: £8,400
- Quarter-finals: £4,450
- Last 16: £2,950
- Last 32: £1,500
- Highest break: £3,000
- Record high break: £5,000
- Maximum break: £10,000

== Summary ==
=== Qualifying ===
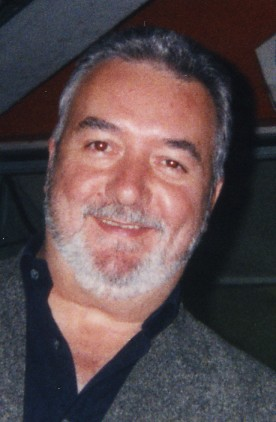
John Virgo (pictured in 2003) made a break of 101 in qualifying for the event.

A two-round qualification tournament was held in March and April across three venues: at the Snooker Centre in Sheffield, Romiley Forum in Stockport, and Redwood Lodge, Bristol. In round one, Mario Morra was 4–9 behind Ian Black, but won five frames to equalise at 9–9. In the deciding frame, Morra made a 51 break, but Black replied with a 37 to win the frame and the match with just two balls remaining. Black compiled a 108 break against Paul Medati in the sixth fame of their second qualifying round, and won seven of the next eight frames to qualify for the main draw with a 10–4 win. Eddie Sinclair recorded a 112 break during a decisive 10–2 defeat of Colin Roscoe. In the second round, Sinclair played Eugene Hughes and led 5–4 after making six breaks over 40. He later won the match 10–8 after making breaks of 99 and 54 in the final two frames. Patsy Fagan failed to qualify for the main draw for the first time in his career, losing 8–10 to Mick Fisher. Les Dodd won a long match against Ian Williamson that concluded at 1:10 am with Dodd winning the deciding frame. Dodd had received a walkover in the first qualifying round after John Dunning did not appear for their match.

Snooker veteran Pat Houlihan took a 7–1 lead against Tommy Murphy, but Murphy won seven of the next eight to bring the match to 8–8. Houlihan won the 17th frame, but Murphy took the next two frames with breaks of 52 and 71, allowing him to progress to the next round. Murphy then lost 8–10 to John Virgo after leading 8–7. Virgo made a break of 101 in the 13th frame. Tony Meo defeated Vic Harris 10–0, and then defeated Geoff Foulds 10–4 to qualify. The tournament's promoter, Mike Watterson lost 6–10 to John Campbell. The reigning world billiards champion, Rex Williams, lost just one frame in qualifying, securing a 10–0 whitewash over Mike Darrington and then defeating Fred Davis 10–1.

Mark Wildman won 10–7 against Bob Harris in the first round and qualified directly for the main draw, receiving a walkover as Jim Wych (who had received a bye into the second round) had not travelled from Canada for the match. Cliff Wilson faced Joe Johnson in the second round, a rematch of the 1978 World Amateur Snooker Championship final. In the first round, Wilson had lost only one frame against Clive Everton, whilst Johnson had whitewashed Paul Watchorn. Wilson won against Johnson 10–8.

=== First round ===
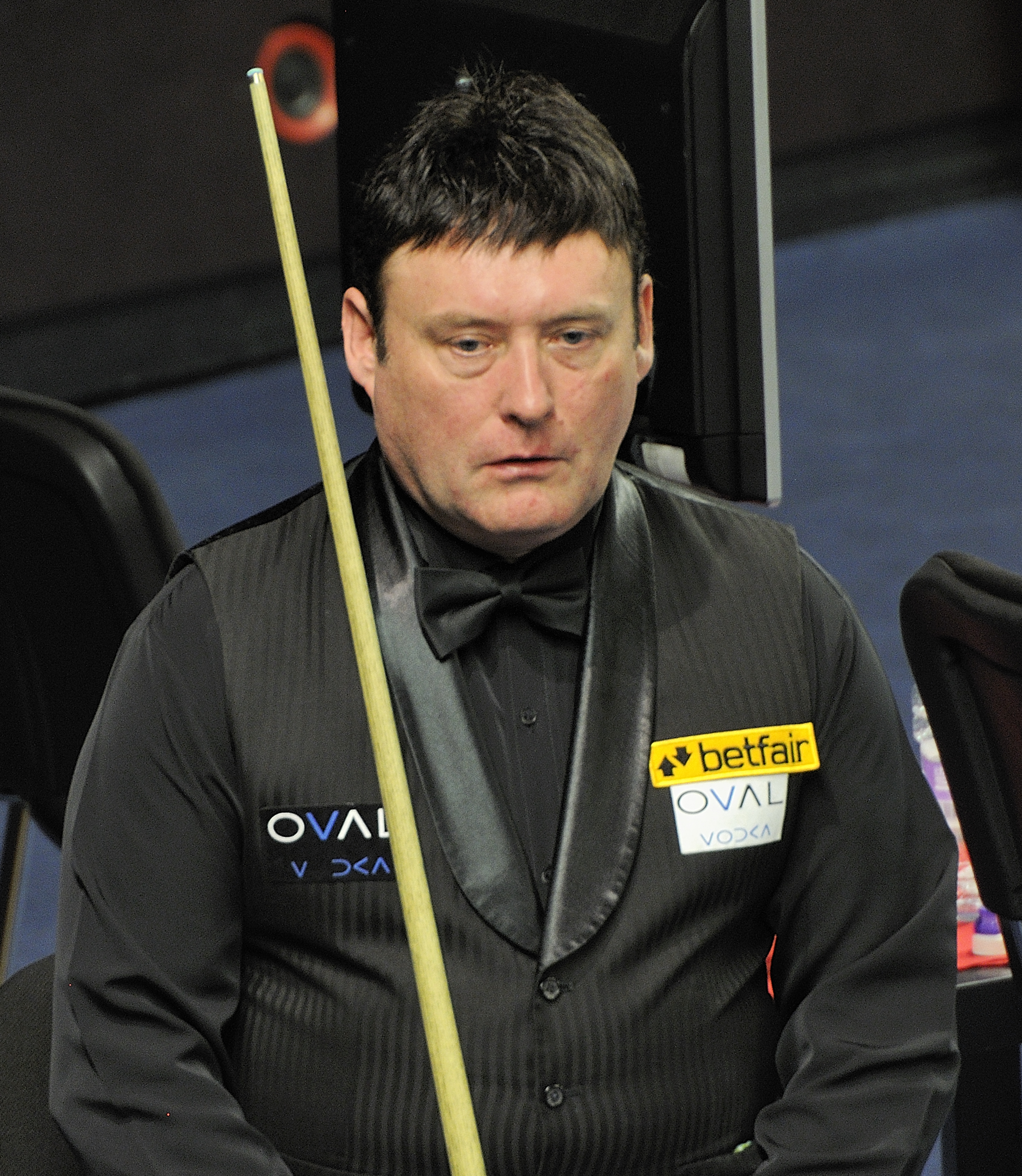
Jimmy White (pictured in 2013) was the only seeded player to lose in the first round.

The first round was played between 16 and 22 April with best-of-19-frame matches held over two sessions. Steve Davis was Coral bookmakers' favourite to win the event, priced at 11/8 the day before the tournament began. Terry Griffiths was the second-favourite at 7/1, with Reardon and defending champion Higgins at 8/1. Davis had won four individual tournaments during the season leading up to the competition, whilst Reardon had claimed three titles, and Higgins's only notable success had been in the 1983 Irish Professional Championship. Higgins led Dean Reynolds, 5–1 and finished their first session 6–3 ahead. He then increased his lead to 8–3, before he won the match 10–4. Willie Thorne took a 6–3 lead over Virgo and won the first four frames of their second session to complete a 10–3 victory.

Having built a 6–3 advantage over Dave Martin in their first session, Canadian Bill Werbeniuk won 10–4. Jim Meadowcroft made a highest break of just 36 as he was defeated 2–10 by David Taylor. Eddie Charlton completed a 10–7 victory against Dodd after ending their first session 5–3 in front. Three-time former winner John Spencer defeated Mike Hallett 10–7 in a closely contested match. Dennis Taylor wore glasses that he later credited for winning the event two years later. He won the last three frames of his match to defeat Silvino Francisco 10–9. Davis took a 6–0 lead over Williams, but Williams reduced the deficit by winning the next three frames. In their second session, Davis won three of the first four frames to complete a 10–4 victory.

Thorburn had a single-frame lead against Campbell after their first session and won 10–5, despite suffering from influenza symptoms. The 1979 champion Griffiths trailed Wildman 7–8 but won the final three frames to secure a 10–8 victory. In an attacking match, Meo defeated his childhood friend Jimmy White 10–8 having led 6–3 after the first session. White was the only one of the top 16 seeds to lose in the first round. Doug Mountjoy won 10–2 against Wilson, and Kirk Stevens defeated Fisher by the same margin. Reardon, having been 5–4 in front overnight, prevailed 10–7 against Hughes in a match that featured few breaks higher than 30. Perrie Mans and Tony Knowles both progressed with 10–3 wins, over Black and Miles respectively.

=== Second round ===
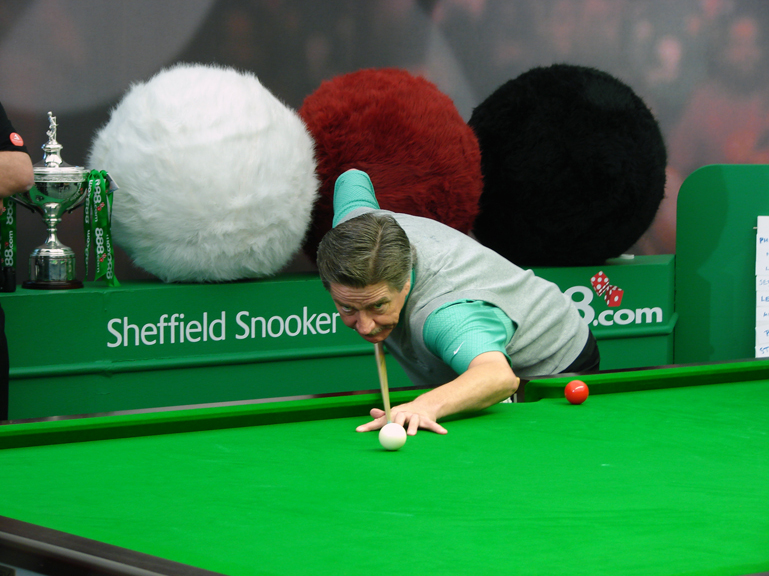
Cliff Thorburn (pictured in 2007) compiled a maximum break, the first made at the World Championship.

The second round was played between 21 and 26 April as the best-of-25-frame matches held over three sessions. Higgins lost the first two frames against Thorne, and in the third frame accused Thorne of making a deliberate miss. Thorne commented that Higgins had accused him of being a cheat, which Higgins denied, although he later said Thorne "hadn't been very sporting". Higgins won the frame, and led Thorne 5–3 by the end of the session. Thorne equalised at 7–7 by the end of the second session. From there, Thorne won only one further frame as Higgins took the match 13–8.

David Taylor led Werbeniuk 10–6 after two sessions, but lost 10–13 after Werbeniuk won seven consecutive frames. Dennis Taylor was a frame ahead of Davis, at 4–3 after their first session, but Davis emerged as the winner, 13–11. Stevens compiled a break of 139 in the second frame against Mans, and went on to take a 7–1 lead after the first session and win 13–3 in two sessions. In a session of slow play, Charlton moved from 9–7 against Spencer to take their match 13–11. Knowles led Reardon 9–7 and, after Reardon had equalised at 11–11 and 12–12, defeated him with a break of 66 in the deciding frame. Meo gained a 5–3 lead over Mountjoy after their first session and went on to win 13–11.

The final session of the match between Thorburn and Griffiths lasted more than seven hours and finished at 3:51 am, which, at the end of the 2019 Championship, still stood as the latest finish for a snooker match at the Crucible, and at 6 hours and 25 minutes, the longest session. Thorburn achieved the first maximum break at a World Snooker Championship in the fourth frame. He was only the second player after Davis at the 1982 Classic to make an official maximum. The break started with Thorburn fluking a red ball. While he was completing the break, play stopped on the tournament's second table because his friend and fellow Canadian Werbeniuk wanted to watch.

=== Quarter-finals ===
The quarter-finals were played between 25 and 27 April as the best-of-25 frames held over three sessions. Charlton compiled a break of 115 in his match against Davis, but Davis took a 5–3 lead into their second session, and then won six of the next eight frames. Davis claimed the first two frames of the final session to complete a 13–5 victory.

Higgins made a break of 109 in the first frame against Werbeniuk, and won the next on the final black ball. At 46 points ahead in the third frame, Higgins attempted to play a snooker behind the pink and was annoyed by referee John Williams, who awarded a foul against him as the cue ball had not touched the pink. After protestations from Higgins, Williams asked the match scorers for a second opinion, and the decision stood. Werbeniuk then made a break of 57 and won the frame. Higgins said that he wanted a change of referee, and threatened to walk out, but following a discussion with tournament promoter Mike Watterson, agreed to return. He won the following two frames, but lost the next after going in-off while playing a shot on the pink. Werbeniuk won that frame and the next, leaving the scores tied at 4–4 at the end of their first session. Werbeniuk took a 9–7 lead by the end on the next session, but Higgins started the third session by winning three consecutive frames. Werbeniuk recorded a break of 109 to level at 11–11, but Higgins won the next two frames to take the match 13–11.

Knowles won the first five frames against Meo and led 6–2 after their first session, before winning 13–9. Thorburn took a 4–0 lead over Stevens, and was 5–3 ahead at the end of their first session. Stevens had led 12–10, but Thorburn won 13–12, with the final session finishing at 2:12 am. As of 2019, this was still the second-longest session (at 6 hours and 11 minutes), and the third-latest finish, since the World Snooker Championship has been held at the Crucible.

=== Semi-finals ===
The semi-finals were played between 28 and 30 April as best-of-31-frame matches scheduled over four sessions. Davis won the first session against Higgins 5–2, and also took the first four frames the following day, making a break of 103 in the opening frame of the second session, to extend his lead to 9–2. At the mid-session interval, the Crucible Theatre was evacuated due to a death threat against Davis that had been telephoned to the venue, saying that he would be shot if he won a tenth frame. After an hour-long police search, the audience was readmitted and the match resumed. Davis was 10–4 ahead at the end of the first day. On the second day of their match, Davis compiled a break of 90 to make his lead 11–4. Higgins replied with a break of 74 to reduce his deficit to 5–11, but Davis then won the next five frames to take the match 16–5.

Knowles led Thorburn 5–3 at the end of their first session before Thorburn levelled the match at both 5–5 and 7–7. Knowles led 8–7 at the end of the second session. Thorburn took the first two frames of the third session, to gain the lead. The players were again equal at 10–10 before Thorburn moved 12–10 ahead at the end of the third session. Knowles won the next two frames after lengthy tactical exchanges, and then took a 13–12 lead with a break of 74. Knowles was within a frame of reaching the final at 15–13, but Thorburn won the next two to force a deciding frame. After Knowles missed potting a red, Thorburn went on to win the frame, and the match 16–15. Due to the length of the frames, the semi-final finished at 12:45 am.

=== Final ===
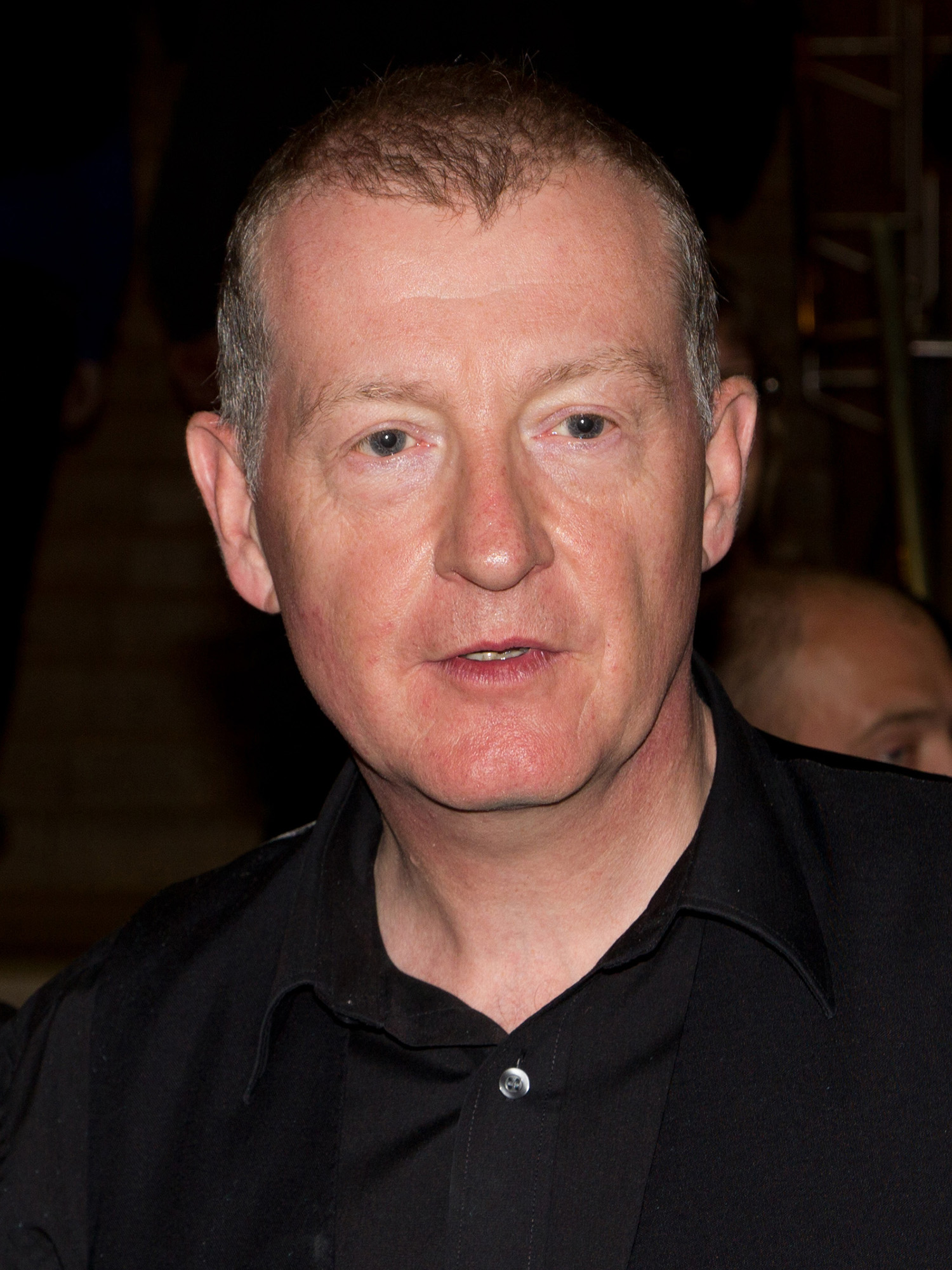
Steve Davis (pictured in 2010) won his second World Championship with a session to spare.

The final was played on 1 and 2 May between Thorburn and Davis as the best of 35 frames, scheduled to be held over four sessions. It was Thorburn's third appearance in a World Championship final, after he had been runner-up in 1977 and champion in 1980. For Davis, it was the second world final, two years after his victory in 1981. At 2–2 after the first four frames, Davis won four in a row to lead 6–2. He increased his advantage to 9–2 at the start of the second session as Thorburn made several errors, including missing a pot on a red when using the rest, an unsuccessful attempt to double a red, and an easy half-ball cut shot. Thorburn then won two frames, but Davis still finished the first day 12–5 ahead.

On the second day, Davis won the first frame on the black ball after Thorburn had missed a shot on the pink to win the frame. Thorburn missed several attempted pots in the second frame of the session, and Davis won this frame too, following it with a break of 59 in winning the third frame, and taking the fourth after another missed pot attempt from Thorburn. After the mid-session interval, Davis compiled a break of 131 in the 22nd frame to leave him one frame from victory at 17–5. Thorburn won one further frame, before Davis achieved victory at 18–6. This was the first final at the Crucible to be completed with a session to spare. The concluding frame was won on a re-spotted black. Thorburn was exhausted during the final after winning his last three matches in deciding frames, according to Everton. He played 14 hours more than Davis throughout the tournament. Snooker historian Clive Everton commented that the long matches Thorburn had played earlier in the tournament "left him so drained ... that he was able to offer only token resistance." Davis became the first player to win the event for a second time at the Crucible.

Davis thanked his family in his post-match speech, and said that his father, and his coach Frank Callan, were the only two people that could help him with snooker. An emotional Davis also offered his commiserations to Thorburn, and said that "he has had a lot of hard things happening to him and I want to thank him for a great final." Thorburn commented on the match, "I know what purgatory is like now. I tried like hell, but it was too hard for me to win." The £30,000 prize money brought Davis's winnings from tournaments to more than £80,000 for the season, with his expected earnings for the following year being estimated at £750,000, including income from sponsorship deals, and from charging £3,000 for playing exhibition matches.

== Main draw ==
Shown below are the results for the tournament. The numbers in brackets are players seedings, whilst those in bold denote match winners.

**First round** Best of 19 frames
16 April
**Alex Higgins (NIR) (1)**	**10**
Dean Reynolds (ENG)	4
16 & 17 April
**Willie Thorne (ENG) (16)**	**10**
John Virgo (ENG)	3
16 & 17 April
**Bill Werbeniuk (CAN) (9)**	**10**
Dave Martin (ENG)	4
16 & 17 April
**David Taylor (ENG) (8)**	**10**
Jim Meadowcroft (ENG)	2
16 & 18 April
**Eddie Charlton (AUS) (5)**	**10**
Les Dodd (ENG)	7
16 & 17 April
**John Spencer (ENG) (12)**	**10**
Mike Hallett (ENG)	7
17 & 18 April
**Dennis Taylor (NIR) (13)**	**10**
Silvino Francisco (RSA)	9
18 & 19 April
**Steve Davis (ENG) (4)**	**10**
Rex Williams (ENG)	4
19 & 20 April
**Cliff Thorburn (CAN) (3)**	**10**
John Campbell (AUS)	5
18 & 19 April
**Terry Griffiths (WAL) (14)**	**10**
Mark Wildman (ENG)	8
19 & 20 April
**Perrie Mans (RSA) (11)**	**10**
Ian Black (SCO)	3
20 & 21 April
**Kirk Stevens (CAN) (6)**	**10**
Mick Fisher (ENG)	2
20 & 21 April
**Doug Mountjoy (WAL) (7)**	**10**
Cliff Wilson (WAL)	2
20 & 21 April
Jimmy White (ENG) (10)	8
**Tony Meo (ENG)**	**10**
21 & 22 April
**Tony Knowles (ENG) (15)**	**10**
Graham Miles (ENG)	3
20 & 21 April
**Ray Reardon (WAL) (2)**	**10**
Eugene Hughes (IRL)	7

**Second round** Best of 25 frames
21 & 22 April
(Northern Ireland) **Alex Higgins (1)**	**13**
(England) Willie Thorne (16)	8
22 & 23 April
(Canada) **Bill Werbeniuk (9)**	**13**
(England) David Taylor (8)	10
23 & 24 April
(Australia) **Eddie Charlton (5)**	**13**
(England) John Spencer (12)	11
22 & 23 April
(Northern Ireland) Dennis Taylor (13)	11
(England) **Steve Davis (4)**	**13**
23 & 24 April
(Canada) **Cliff Thorburn (3)**	**13**
(Wales) Terry Griffiths (14)	12
24 April
(South Africa) Perrie Mans (11)	3
(Canada) **Kirk Stevens (6)**	**13**
25 & 26 April
(Wales) Doug Mountjoy (7)	11
(England) **Tony Meo**	**13**
24, 25 & 26 April
(England) **Tony Knowles (15)**	**13**
(Wales) Ray Reardon (2)	12

**Quarter-finals**; Best of 25 frames
25, 26 & 27 April
(Northern Ireland) **Alex Higgins (1)**	**13**
(Canada) Bill Werbeniuk (9)	11
25, 26 & 27 April
(Australia) Eddie Charlton (5)	5
(England) **Steve Davis (4)**	**13**
26 & 27 April
(Canada) **Cliff Thorburn (3)**	**13**
(Canada) Kirk Stevens (6)	12
26 & 27 April
(England) Tony Meo	9
(England) **Tony Knowles (15)**	**13**

**Semi-finals**; Best of 31 frames
28 & 29 April
(Northern Ireland) Alex Higgins (1)	5
(England) **Steve Davis (4)**	**16**
28, 29 & 30 April
(Canada) **Cliff Thorburn (3)**	**16**
(England) Tony Knowles (15)	15

**Final**; Best of 35 frames
1 & 2 May
(England) **Steve Davis (4)**	**18**
(Canada) Cliff Thorburn (3)	6

**Final** (Best of 35 frames) Crucible Theatre, Sheffield, 1 & 2 May 1983. Referee: Len Ganley
**Steve Davis (4)**
England
**18**–6
Cliff Thorburn (3)
Canada
**82**–20, 11–112, **83**–39, 36–80, **80**–34, **65**–34, **81**–44, **75**–26, **82**–6, **73**–0, **81**–48, 41–67, 25–71, **100**–8, 15–68, **96**–2, **76**–47, **58**–53, **75**–28, **62**–47, **67**–62, **131**–0, 24–62, **77**–70
Century breaks: 1 (Davis 1)

Highest break by Davis: 131
Highest break by Thorburn: 55

82–20, 11–**112**, 83–39, 36–**80**, 80–34, 65–34, 81–44, 75–26, 82–6, 73–0, 81–48, 41–**67**, 25–**71**, 100–8, 15–**68**, 96–2, 76–47, 58–53, 75–28, 62–47, 67–62, 131–0, 24–**62**, 77–70
**(England) Steve Davis** wins his second World Snooker Championship.

== Qualifying ==
Qualifying was played over two rounds both played as the best-of-19 frames between 28 March and 11 April and played across 3 venues. The 16 players qualifying for the event met a seeded player in the main competition. Players in bold denote match winners.

**First round** Best of 19 frames
**Billy Kelly (IRL)**	**10**
Bert Demarco (SCO)	4
**Paddy Morgan (AUS)**	**10**
Pascal Burke (IRL)	9
**Tommy Murphy (IRL)**	**10**
Pat Houlihan (ENG)	9
**Rex Williams (ENG)**	**10**
Mike Darrington (ENG)	0
**Mark Wildman (ENG)**	**10**
Bob Harris (ENG)	7
**Ray Edmonds (ENG)**	**10**
Frank Jonik (CAN)	4
**Mick Fisher (ENG)**	**10**
Patsy Fagan (IRL)	8
**Eddie McLaughlin (SCO)**	**10**
David Greaves (ENG)	7
**Tony Meo (ENG)**	**10**
Vic Harris (ENG)	0
**Geoff Foulds (ENG)**	**10**
Matt Gibson (SCO)	6
**Ian Black (SCO)**	**10**
Mario Morra (CAN)	9
**Paul Medati (ENG)**	**10**
John Bear (CAN)	7
**Cliff Wilson (WAL)**	**10**
Clive Everton (WAL)	1
**Joe Johnson (ENG)**	**10**
Paul Watchorn (IRL)	0
**Murdo MacLeod (SCO)**	**10**
Marcus Owen (WAL)	5
**Dave Martin (ENG)**	**10**
Maurice Parkin (ENG)	1
**Jim Meadowcroft (ENG)**	**10**
Bernard Bennett (ENG)	3
**Graham Cripsey (ENG)**	**10**
Dennis Hughes (ENG)	2
**Jim Donnelly (SCO)**	**10**
Dessie Sheehan (IRL)	6
**John Campbell (AUS)**	**10**
Mike Watterson (ENG)	6
**Les Dodd (ENG)**	**w.o.**
John Dunning (ENG)
**Ian Williamson (ENG)**	**10**
Doug French (ENG)	8
**Mike Hallett (ENG)**	**10**
Roy Andrewartha (WAL)	7
**Warren King (AUS)**	**10**
Ian Anderson (AUS)	6
**Eugene Hughes (IRL)**	**10**
Jack Fitzmaurice (ENG)	7
**Eddie Sinclair (SCO)**	**10**
Colin Roscoe (WAL)	2

**Second round** Best of 19 frames
**Silvino Francisco (RSA)**	**10**
Billy Kelly (IRL)	5
**Graham Miles (ENG)**	**10**
Paddy Morgan (AUS)	6
**John Virgo (ENG)**	**10**
Tommy Murphy (IRL)	8
Fred Davis (ENG)	1
**Rex Williams (ENG)**	**10**
Jim Wych (CAN)
**Mark Wildman (ENG)**	**w.o.**
**Dean Reynolds (ENG)**	**10**
Ray Edmonds (ENG)	6
**Mick Fisher (ENG)**	**10**
Eddie McLaughlin (SCO)	9
**Tony Meo (ENG)**	**10**
Geoff Foulds (ENG)	4
**Ian Black (SCO)**	**10**
Paul Medati (ENG)	4
**Cliff Wilson (WAL)**	**10**
Joe Johnson (ENG)	8
Murdo MacLeod (SCO)	7
**Dave Martin (ENG)**	**10**
**Jim Meadowcroft (ENG)**	**10**
Graham Cripsey (ENG)	6
Jim Donnelly (SCO)	2
**John Campbell (AUS)**	**10**
**Les Dodd (ENG)**	**10**
Ian Williamson (ENG)	9
**Mike Hallett (ENG)**	**10**
Warren King (AUS)	6
**Eugene Hughes (IRL)**	**10**
Eddie Sinclair (SCO)	8

== Century breaks ==
There were 18 century breaks compiled during the championship, a record which stood until 1986. The highest break of the event was a maximum break of 147 made by Thorburn, earning a £5,000 bonus.

- 147 – Cliff Thorburn
- 139, 105 – Kirk Stevens
- 131, 103 – Steve Davis
- 122, 116 – Ray Reardon
- 118, 115, 104 – Eddie Charlton
- 118, 106 – Doug Mountjoy
- 111 – Jimmy White
- 109, 102 – Alex Higgins
- 109 – Bill Werbeniuk
- 106 – John Spencer
- 102 – Tony Meo
