= Colin Brinded =

English snooker referee

Personal information
- Born: c.1946 England
- Died: 26 November 2005

Sport
- Country: England
- Sport: Snooker
- Professional: 1976–2005

Colin Brinded (c.1946 – 26 November 2005) was an English snooker referee from 1976 until his death.

Brinded began officiating at major professional events in 1976. Two occasions on which he officiated during key matches were the World Championship finals between Stephen Hendry and Mark Williams in 1999 and the match between Peter Ebdon and Ronnie O'Sullivan in 2005 (the so-called "slow-play" match). He was the referee for four matches in which maximum breaks were compiled.

Brinded died from cancer, aged 59. Players John Higgins, Stephen Hendry and Steve Davis all paid tribute to him after learning of his death. Davis said, "If I knew Colin was refereeing my match, I knew I was in good hands."
