= 1994–95 snooker world rankings =

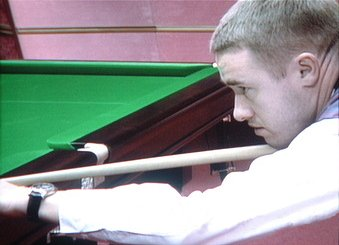
Stephen Hendry (pictured in 2003) retained top place in the ranking list.

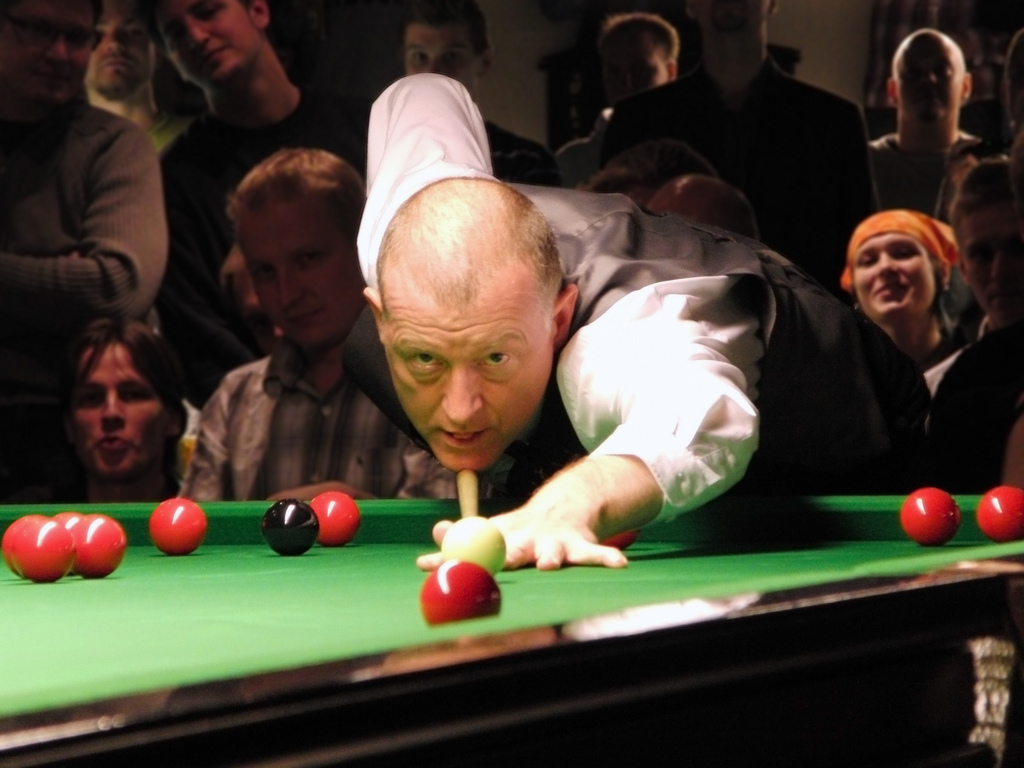
Steve Davis (pictured in 2008) was ranked second, up from fourth the previous season.

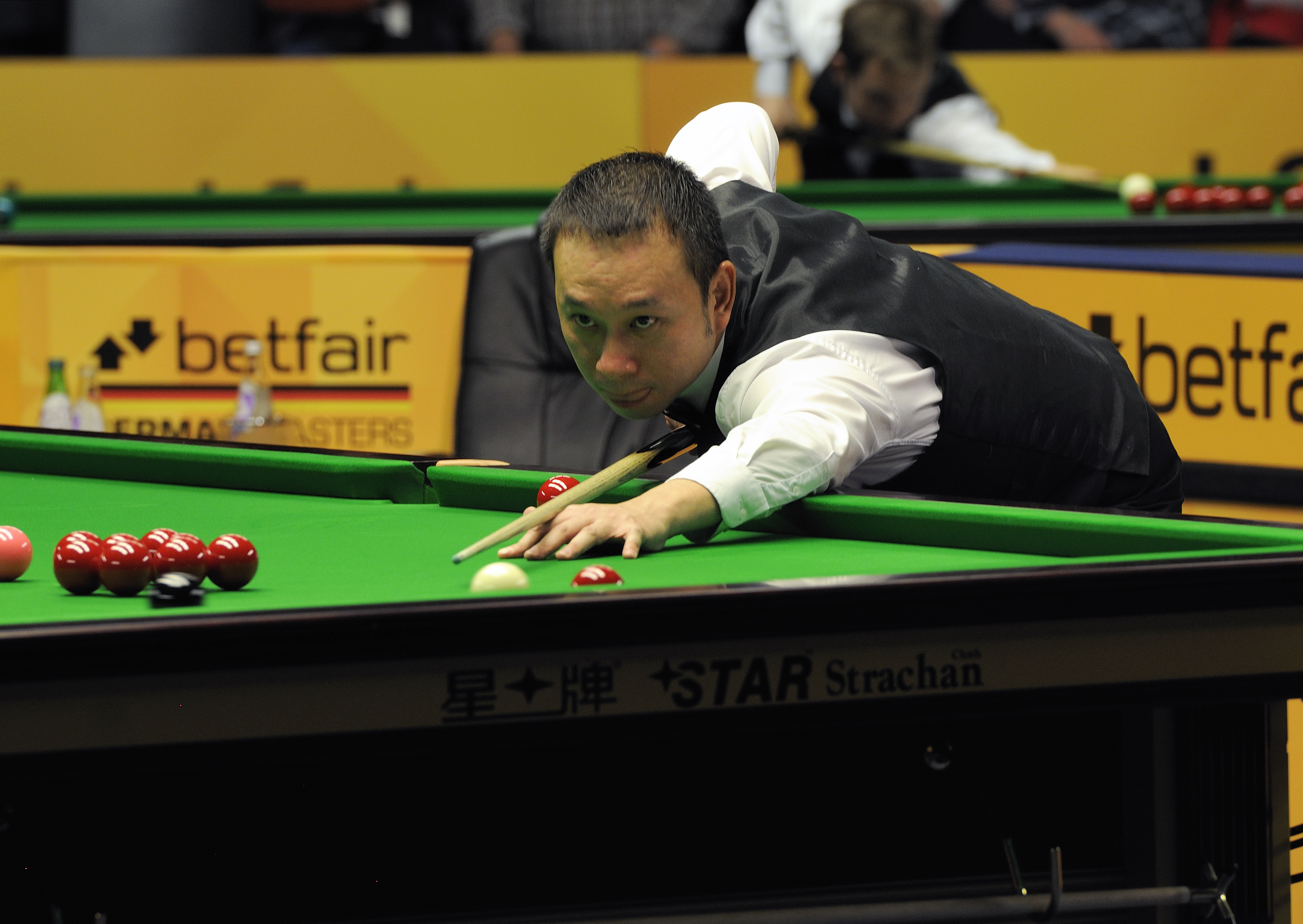
James Wattana (pictured in 2003) was the first new player in the top four since 1988.

The World Professional Billiards and Snooker Association (WPBSA), the governing body for professional snooker, first introduced a ranking system for professional players in 1976, with the aim of seeding players for the World Snooker Championship. The reigning champion would be automatically seeded first, the losing finalist from the previous year seeded second, and the other seedings based on the ranking list.

The 1994–95 ranking list was based on results from nine ranking tournaments and four minor-ranking events from the 1992–93 snooker season, and nine ranking tournaments from the 1993–94 snooker season. The ranking list was published after the conclusion of the 1994 World Snooker Championship. Stephen Hendry retained the top ranking for the fifth consecutive year. Steve Davis moved up from fourth to second. James Wattana was third, ahead of Jimmy White, on the same points total, as Wattana had gained more points in the more recent season. Wattana became the first new player in the top four since 1988, replacing John Parrott.

The top 16 in the rankings are regarded as the elite of professional snooker, and those players receive invitations to the Masters and exemption to the last-32 stage of the World Snooker Championship. It was the first season in the top 16 for Ronnie O'Sullivan, Peter Ebdon, Tony Drago and Joe Swail. O'Sullivan, winner of the 1993 UK Championship and the 1994 British Open, rose from 57th to 9th place.

For the first time since the rankings were established in 1976, Dennis Taylor was not among the top 16; the other players to drop out were Steve James, Martin Clark and Neal Foulds. Among the players to significantly improve their ranking were Dave Harold, who went from 50th to 19th; Stephen Lee who moved to 40th from 101st; Fergal O'Brien, who rose from 100th to 42nd; and Alex Higgins, who improved from 61st to 48th. The highest-placed of the players who had only been professional for one season was Gerard Greene at 169th, followed by Gary Ponting at 173rd.

== Points tariff ==
Points were awarded per the tables below, with some special conditions about players who lost their initial match in a tournament. In UK-based tournaments including the World Snooker Championship, players received half of the points stated if they lost their first match. In non-UK events, the top 16 players received only 1/4 of the points stated if they lost their opening match (which was in the last-32 round). If two players were level on points, the player with more points from the most recent season would be ranked higher.

Ranking points tariff for 1992–93
Rounds	1	2	3	4	5	6	7	8	9	10	11	12	13	QF	SF	R-up	Winner
1992 Dubai Classic	—	16	20	30	50	100	200	400	800	1,200	1,600	2,000	—	2,400	2,800	3,200	3,600
1992 Grand Prix	—	16	20	30	50	100	200	400	800	1,200	1,600	2,000	—	2,400	2,800	3,200	3,600
1992 UK Championship	—	20	30	40	60	120	250	500	1,000	1,500	2,000	2,500	—	3,000	3,500	4,000	4,500
1993 Asian Open	—	16	20	30	50	100	200	400	800	1,200	1,600	2,000	—	2,400	2,800	3,200	3,600
1993 Welsh Open	—	16	20	30	50	100	200	400	800	1,200	1,600	2,000	—	2,400	2,800	3,200	3,600
1993 European Open (1992/1993)	—	—	20	30	50	100	200	400	800	1,200	1,600	2,000	—	2,400	2,800	3,200	3,600
1993 International Open	—	—	20	30	50	100	200	400	800	1,200	1,600	2,000	—	2,400	2,800	3,200	3,600
1993 British Open	—	16	20	30	50	100	200	400	800	1,200	1,600	2,000	—	2,400	2,800	3,200	3,600
1993 World Snooker Championship	—	30	40	50	80	150	300	600	1,200	1,800	2,400	3,000	3,600	4,200	4,800	5,400	6,000

Minor ranking events 1992–93
Tournament	Notes
1992 Benson & Hedges Championship	300 points for the winner. The rest of the ranking points tariff is unknown but was approximately 10% of the points compared to a standard ranking event
Strachan Challenge 1992/1993 – Event 1	Ranking points tariff unknown, but approximately 10% of the points compared to a standard ranking event for each
Strachan Challenge 1992/1993 – Event 2	Ranking points tariff unknown, but approximately 10% of the points compared to a standard ranking event for each
Strachan Challenge 1992/1993 – Event 3	Ranking points tariff unknown, but approximately 10% of the points compared to a standard ranking event for each

Ranking points tariff for 1993–94 († denotes the last-16 round)
Category	Rounds	1	2	3	4	5	6	7	8	9	10	11	12	13	14	15	QF	SF	R-up	Winner
Overseas events
Overseas events	1993 Dubai Classic	—	4	8	16	20	30	50	100	200	400	800	1,200	1,600	2,000	2,200†	2,400	2,800	3,200	3,600
Overseas events	1994 Thailand Open	—	4	8	16	20	30	50	100	200	400	800	1,200	1,600	2,000	2,200†	2,400	2,800	3,200	3,600
Overseas events	1993 European Open (1993/1994)	—	4	8	16	20	30	50	100	200	400	800	1,200	1,600	2,000	2,200 †	2,400	2,800	3,200	3,600
UK events
UK events	1993 UK Championship	—	6	10	20	30	40	60	120	250	500	1,000	1,500	2,000	2,500†	—	3,000	3,500	4,000	4,500
UK events	1993 Grand Prix	—	4	8	16	20	30	50	100	200	400	800	1,200	1,600	2,000†	—	2,400	2,800	3,200	3,600
UK events	1994 Welsh Open	—	4	8	16	20	30	50	100	200	400	800	1,200	1,600	2,000†	—	2,400	2,800	3,200	3,600
UK events	1994 International Open	—	4	8	16	20	30	50	100	200	400	800	1,200	1,600	2,000†	—	2,400	2,800	3,200	3,600
UK events	1994 British Open	—	4	8	16	20	30	50	100	200	400	800	1,200	1,600	2,000†	—	2,400	2,800	3,200	3,600
World Championship	1994 World Snooker Championship	—	8	16	30	40	50	80	150	300	600	1,200	1,800	2,400	3,000	3,600†	4,200	4,800	5,400	6,000

== Rankings ==
Snooker world rankings 1994–95
Ranking	Name	Points
1	Stephen Hendry (SCO)	53,300
2	Steve Davis (ENG)	52,300
3	James Wattana (THA)	49,000
4	Jimmy White (ENG)	49,000
5	John Parrott (ENG)	48,300
6	Alan McManus (SCO)	46,750
7	Ken Doherty (IRL)	42,020
8	Darren Morgan (WAL)	41,500
9	Ronnie O'Sullivan (ENG)	37,620
10	Peter Ebdon (ENG)	35,240
11	Nigel Bond (ENG)	34,730
12	Joe Swail (NIR)	32,680
13	David Roe (ENG)	32,580
14	Terry Griffiths (WAL)	31,250
15	Willie Thorne (ENG)	31,250
16	Tony Drago (MLT)	30,250
17	Steve James (ENG)	30,200
18	Martin Clark (ENG)	29,560
19	Dave Harold (ENG)	28,920
20	Dene O'Kane (NZL)	28,820
21	Tony Knowles (ENG)	28,090
22	Gary Wilkinson (ENG)	27,610
23	Mike Hallett (ENG)	27,300
24	Dennis Taylor (NIR)	26,700
25	Neal Foulds (ENG)	25,620
26	Doug Mountjoy (WAL)	24,560
27	Mick Price (ENG)	24,420
28	Jason Ferguson (ENG)	24,300
29	Dean Reynolds (ENG)	23,750
30	Brian Morgan (ENG)	23,720
31	Mark Bennett (WAL)	23,530
32	Alain Robidoux (CAN)	23,170
33	Andy Hicks (ENG)	22,515
34	Tony Jones (ENG)	22,510
35	Anthony Hamilton (ENG)	22,230
36	Billy Snaddon (SCO)	21,940
37	Joe Johnson (ENG)	20,280
38	Nick Terry (ENG)	20,040
39	Drew Henry (SCO)	19,980
40	Stephen Lee (ENG)	19,530
41	David Finbow (ENG)	19,115
42	Fergal O'Brien (IRL)	18,820
43	Les Dodd (ENG)	18,700
44	Mark Johnston-Allen (ENG)	18,630
45	Rod Lawler (ENG)	18,380
46	Danny Fowler (ENG)	18,190
47	Jason Prince (NIR)	17,820
48	Alex Higgins (NIR)	17,420
49	Nigel Gilbert (ENG)	17,320
50	Jonathan Birch (ENG)	17,300
51	John Higgins (SCO)	17,200
52	Wayne Jones (WAL)	17,150
53	Tony Chappel (WAL)	17,000
54	Cliff Thorburn (CAN)	16,970
55	Paul Davies (WAL)	16,800
56	Jim Wych (CAN)	16,560
57	Silvino Francisco (RSA)	16,376
58	Mark Williams (WAL)	15,935
59	Paul McPhillips (SCO)	15,890
60	Eddie Charlton (AUS)	15,650
61	Peter Francisco (RSA)	15,280
62	Steve Newbury (WAL)	15,280
63	Stephen Murphy (IRL)	15,230
64	Anthony Davies (WAL)	14,860
65	Mark Davis (ENG)	14,860
66	Cliff Wilson (WAL)	14,790
67	Karl Broughton (ENG)	14,725
68	Stephen O'Connor (IRL)	14,605
69	Tony Meo (ENG)	14,430
70	Ian Graham (ENG)	13,220
71	Eugene Hughes (IRL)	13,080
72	Bob Chaperon (CAN)	12,600
73	Stefan Mazrocis (ENG)	11,995
74	Troy Shaw (ENG)	11,985
75	Brian Rowswell (ENG)	11,915
76	Jimmy Michie (ENG)	11,755
77	Jack McLaughlin (NIR)	11,710
78	Karl Payne (ENG)	11,625
79	Craig Edwards (ENG)	11,255
80	Sean Lanigan (ENG)	11,210
81	Joe Grech (MLT)	11,145
82	Mark Rowing (ENG)	11,100
83	Shokat Ali (PAK)	10,845
84	Mark Flowerdew (ENG)	10,785
85	Steve Judd (ENG)	10,740
86	Chris Small (SCO)	10,615
87	John Read (ENG)	10,560
88	Paul Tanner (ENG)	10,345
89	Mark King (ENG)	10,250
90	Nick Dyson (ENG)	10,180
91	Terry Murphy (NIR)	10,125
92	David McDonnell (IRL)	9,730
93	Jamie Woodman (ENG)	9,595
94	Shaun Mellish (ENG)	9,455
95	Andrew Cairns (ENG)	9,445
96	Sean Storey (ENG)	9,370
97	Darren Clarke (ENG)	9,255
98	Brady Gollan (CAN)	9,225
99	Dominic Dale (WAL)	9,086
100	Darryn Walker (ENG)	9,075
101	Ian Brumby (ENG)	9,035
102	Jason Weston (ENG)	8,965
103	Peter Daubney (ENG)	8,730
104	David Taylor (ENG)	8,575
105	Jamie Burnett (SCO)	8,490
106	Steve Campbell (ENG)	8,435
107	Barry West (ENG)	8,370
108	John Giles (ENG)	8,120
109	Nick Fruin (ENG)	8,085
110	Dylan Leary (NIR)	8,015
111	Chris Scanlon (ENG)	7,958
112	Yasin Merchant (IND)	7,901
113	Colin Morton (ENG)	7,840
114	Warren King (AUS)	7,725
115	Steve Meakin (ENG)	7,520
116	Scott MacFarlane (SCO)	7,515
117	Surinder Gill (ENG)	7,470
118	Franky Chan (HKG)	7,425
119	Euan Henderson (SCO)	7,070
120	Oliver King (ENG)	6,975
121	Lee Richardson (ENG)	6,955
122	Ken Owers (ENG)	6,885
123	Anthony Harris (ENG)	6,855
124	Paul Gibson (ENG)	6,810
125	Roger Garrett (ENG)	6,650
126	Robby Foldvari (AUS)	6,610
127	Pat Kenny (ENG)	6,590
128	Antony Bolsover (ENG)	6,480
129	Peter Lines (ENG)	6,420
130	Jason Wallace (ENG)	6,420
131	Steve Longworth (ENG)	6,405
132	Nick Walker (ENG)	6,360
133	Jim Chambers (ENG)	6,275
134	Tony Wilson (IOM)	6,235
135	Matthew Couch (ENG)	6,198
136	Colin Roscoe (WAL)	6,185
137	Marcus Campbell (SCO)	6,080
138	Jeff Cundy (ENG)	5,995
139	Steve Duggan (ENG)	5,925
140	Murdo MacLeod (SCO)	5,910
141	Barry Pinches (ENG)	5,850
142	Adrian Rosa (ENG)	5,825
143	Noppadon Noppachorn (THA)	5,776
144	Amrik Cheema (IND)	5,760
145	Spencer Dunn (ENG)	5,755
146	Bill Oliver (ENG)	5,755
147	Craig MacGillivray (SCO)	5,455
148	Graham Horne (SCO)	5,430
149	Tony Rampello (ENG)	5,400
150	Robert Marshall (ENG)	5,390
151	Joe O'Boye (IRL)	5,310
152	Jason Whittaker (ENG)	5,310
153	Robert Foxall (ENG)	5,245
154	Bradley Jones (ENG)	5,165
155	Karl Burrows (ENG)	5,105
156	David McLellan (SCO)	5,100
157	Mark Boyd (ENG)	5,095
158	Daniel Murphy (ENG)	5,035
159	John Virgo (ENG)	4,925
160	Paul Wykes (ENG)	4,910
161	Anthony O'Connor (IRL)	4,910
162	Kirk Stevens (CAN)	4,900
163	Paul Cavney (ENG)	4,865
164	Paddy Browne (IRL)	4,840
165	Darren Hackeson (ENG)	4,815
166	Mehmet Husnu (CYP)	4,790
167	Steve Lemmens (BEL)	4,755
168	Dermot McGlinchey (NIR)	4,655
169	Gerard Greene (NIR)	4,640
170	Jimmy Long (IRL)	4,545
171	Michael Judge (IRL)	4,538
172	Stuart Reardon (ENG)	4,510
173	Gary Ponting (ENG)	4,496
174	Jason Smith (ENG)	4,445
175	Colin Kelly (ENG)	4,420
176	Bjorn L'Orange (NOR)	4,410
177	Alan Trigg (ENG)	4,395
178	Bob Harris (ENG)	4,300
179	Steve Prest (ENG)	4,280
180	Alex Borg (MLT)	4,260
181	Wayne Rendle (ENG)	4,190
182	David Rippon (ENG)	4,145
183	Mark Pugh (ENG)	4,040
184	Gary Lees (ENG)	4,005
185	Ian Sargeant (WAL)	3,982
186	Joe Delaney (IRL)	3,980
187	Stuart Pettman (ENG)	3,960
188	Paul Medati (ENG)	3,925
189	Suriya Suwannasingh (THA)	3,913
190	Dave Martin (ENG)	3,860
191	Barry Bunn (ENG)	3,830
192	Rex Williams (ENG)	3,825
193	Nic Barrow (ENG)	3,805
194	Mark O'Sullivan (IRL)	3,766
195	Chris Cookson (ENG)	3,730
196	Cary Kikis (ENG)	3,715
197	Jamie Bodle (ENG)	3,698
198	Mark Gray (ENG)	3,645
199	Roger Leighton (ENG)	3,445
200	Sergio Beggiato (ENG)	3,415
201	Graham MacDonald (ENG)	3,390
202	Allison Fisher (ENG)	3,365
203	Leigh Robinson (ENG)	3,350
204	Carl Waters (ENG)	3,249
205	David Grimwood (ENG)	3,235
206	Dave Gilbert (ENG)	3,170
207	Steve Mifsud (AUS)	3,160
208	Jason Pegram (ENG)	3,145
209	John Lardner (SCO)	3,140
210	Anton Bishop (ENG)	3,115
211	John Shilton (ENG)	3,085
212	Robin Hull (FIN)	3,070
213	Jonathan Saunders (ENG)	3,044
214	Nick Marsh (ENG)	3,014
215	Pat Horne (ENG)	2,980
216	Ian Williamson (ENG)	2,945
217	Leigh Griffin (ENG)	2,930
218	Danny Smith (ENG)	2,930
219	Mike Dunn (ENG)	2,920
220	Gary Peters (WAL)	2,910
221	Simon Morris (ENG)	2,910
222	John Burns (ENG)	2,890
223	Mukesh Parmar (ENG)	2,865
224	Sean Lynskey (ENG)	2,830
225	Garry Baldrey (ENG)	2,795
226	Eddie Manning (ENG)	2,780
227	Nick Pearce (ENG)	2,774
228	Darren Guest (ENG)	2,770
229	David Coles (ENG)	2,715
230	Graham Cripsey (ENG)	2,615
231	Michael Duffy (NIR)	2,560
232	Richard Pincott (ENG)	2,535
233	Neil Tomkins (WAL)	2,503
234	Guy Dennis (ENG)	2,485
235	Eddie Lott (ENG)	2,480
236	Sonic Multani (IND)	2,480
237	Paul Davison (ENG) (Note: There were two players called Paul Davison on the ranking list.)	2,443
238	Stuart Parnell (ENG)	2,360
239	Steve Russell (ENG)	2,295
240	Mick Smith (ENG)	2,275
241	Ray Edmonds (ENG)	2,250
242	Paul Davison (ENG)	2,249
243	Neil Mosley (ENG)	2,200
244	Sefton Payne (ENG)	2,163
245	Simon Parker (ENG)	2,145
246	Steve Elliott (ENG)	2,100
247	Mick Fisher (ENG)	2,080
248	Peter Gilchrist (ENG)	2,010
249	Daryl Peach (ENG)	2,010
250	Tony Kearney (IRL)	1,985
251	David Wilson (ENG)	1,943
252	Steve Whalley (ENG)	1,920
253	Martin O'Neill (NIR)	1,880
254	Tom Finstad (CAN)	1,840
255	Scott Bigham (SCO)	1,825
256	Steve Ventham (ENG)	1,795
257	Ian McCulloch (ENG)	1,778
258	Andrew Hannah (ENG)	1,708
259	Graham Fisken (ENG)	1,700
260	Peter McCullagh (ENG)	1,680
261	Matt Wilson (ENG)	1,660
262	Robert Chapman (ENG)	1,650
263	Stuart Mann (ENG)	1,640
264	Richy McDonald (SCO)	1,620
265	Joe Perry (ENG)	1,617
266	Craig Harrison (ENG)	1,610
267	Wayne Lloyd (WAL)	1,610
268	David Buskin (ENG)	1,609
269	Alan Peacock (ENG)	1,575
270	Lee Grant (ENG)	1,525
271	Micky Wareham (ENG)	1,515
272	Paul Webb (ENG)	1,510
273	Micky Roughan (IRL)	1,490
274	John Timson (ENG)	1,485
275	Frank Maskell (ENG)	1,475
276	Craig Newson (ENG)	1,470
277	Jason Walton (ENG)	1,420
278	Shane Haines (ENG)	1,415
279	Dessie Sheehan (IRL)	1,400
280	Paul Watchorn (IRL)	1,380
281	Iwan Jones (WAL)	1,375
282	Mike Darrington (ENG)	1,340
283	Will Jerram (ENG)	1,315
284	Dean Venables (ENG)	1,295
285	Kevin Young (ENG)	1,290
286	Tim Bailey (ENG)	1,288
287	Julian Goodyear (ENG)	1,280
288	Stephen Roberts (ENG)	1,225
289	Paul Florence (ENG)	1,216
290	Michael Leach (ENG)	1,210
291	Joe Canny (IRL)	1,200
292	Steve Harrison (ENG)	1,160
293	John Dunning (ENG)	1,150
294	Jamie Rous (ENG)	1,145
295	Darren Lennox (IRL)	1,140
296	Karl Townsend (ENG)	1,130
297	Richard Culham (ENG)	1,097
298	Philip Seaton (ENG)	1,095
299	Mario Fernandez (IRL)	1,080
300	Gay Burns (IRL)	1,065
301	Jack Fitzmaurice (ENG)	1,050
302	Steve Archer (ENG)	1,044
303	Mark Williams (ENG)	1,026
304	Jonathan Bagley (ENG)	1,025
305	Steven Evans (ENG)	1,021
306	Nick Jones (WAL)	1,020
307	Jim Donnelly (SCO)	1,000
308	David Singh (IND)	970
309	Anthony Taylor (ENG)	970
310	John Manley (ENG)	970
311	Anthony Halpin (ENG)	960
312	Ian Hurdman (ENG)	958
313	Stephen Taylor (ENG)	955
314	Paul Hefford (ENG)	950
315	Graham Stevens (ENG)	940
316	Martin Dziewialtowski (SCO)	938
317	Jason Scott (ENG)	936
318	Geet Sethi (IND)	915
319	Richard King (ENG)	910
320	Chris Nicholson (ENG)	895
321	Robert Tavagna (AUS)	880
322	James Vicarey (ENG)	873
323	David Blakey (ENG)	865
324	David Langton (ENG)	860
325	Gerry Jones (IRL)	830
326	Vince McCluskey (ENG)	830
327	Andrew Atkinson (ENG)	822
328	Stacey Hillyard (ENG)	820
329	John Bayliss (ENG)	806
330	Jason Hawen (ENG)	805
331	Justin Buckingham (ENG)	795
332	Kevin Lownds (ENG)	790
333	Norman Maher (WAL)	785
334	Terrance Burke (ENG)	780
335	Richard McHugh (IRL)	776
336	Darren Limburg (ENG)	753
337	Anthony Buckley (ENG)	750
338	Stuart Henderson (ENG)	740
339	Lee Walters (ENG)	733
340	Alistair Fleming (SCO)	686
341	John Knipe (ENG)	666
342	Hitesh Lakhani (ENG)	655
343	Thomas McKenna (ENG)	655
344	Neil Selman (ENG)	635
345	Sam Chong (MAS)	635
346	Alfonso Bellusci (ENG)	632
347	Andrew Photiou (ENG)	622
348	Shawn Budd (AUS)	618
349	Hassan Vaizie (ENG)	615
350	Wayne Saidler (ENG)	614
351	Ian Bullimore (ENG)	611
352	Roy Bigg (ENG)	603
353	Craig Bradshaw (ENG)	596
354	Matthew Spade (ENG)	593
355	Lyndon Smith (ENG)	590
356	Robert Harrhy (WAL)	585
357	Philip Williams (WAL)	546
358	Tim Dunphy (IRL)	540
359	Richard Davis (ENG)	534
360	Kevin Brown (ENG)	520
361	Jayson Morris (ENG)	511
362	Norman MacLachlan (SCO)	505
363	Gareth Chilcott (WAL)	496
364	Steven Cook (ENG)	495
365	Patrick Delsemme (BEL)	488
366	Fred Davis (ENG)	485
367	Mario Geudens (BEL)	484
368	David Stone (ENG)	483
369	Richard Wheelhouse (ENG)	480
370	Martin Grainger (ENG)	475
371	Alan Edmonds (ENG)	472
372	Grant Peabody (ENG)	465
373	Michael O'Sullivan (ENG)	465
374	Louis Fazekas (CAN)	465
375	Andrew Essilfie (ENG)	462
376	Ryan Milton (ENG)	462
377	John Herbert (WAL)	460
378	Gary Morris (ENG)	458
379	Philip Minchin (ENG)	455
380	Peter Bullen (BEL)	454
381	Declan Hughes (NIR)	444
382	Mark Whatley (ENG)	443
383	Elliott Clark (ENG)	441
384	Mario Wehrmann (NED)	438
385	Darren Martin (ENG)	436
386	David Mole (ENG)	426
387	Richard Pipe (ENG)	425
388	David Athorn (ENG)	425
389	Paul Clarke (ENG)	423
390	Craig Barber (ENG)	412
391	Carl Groves (ENG)	410
392	Richard Cleeter (ENG)	398
393	Paul Smith (ENG)	394
394	Matthew Catchpole (ENG)	390
395	Brett Patmore (ENG)	386
396	Jason Curtis (ENG)	385
397	Karen Corr (NIR)	380
398	Stephen Popplewell (ENG)	376
399	Richard Batty (ENG)	373
400	Andrew Krasinski (ENG)	366
401	Andrew Alexandrou (ENG)	361
402	Wilfred Dijkstra (NED)	360
403	Geoff Williams (ENG)	360
404	Chris Henry (BEL)	358
405	Johnny Kemp (SCO)	348
406	Glenn Stevenson (ENG)	342
407	John Leahy (IRL)	335
408	Derek Heaton (ENG)	335
409	Fjolnir Thorgeirsson (ISL)	325
410	Malcolm Billaney (ENG)	319
411	Udesh Pillay (ENG)	319
412	David Lazenby (ENG)	315
413	Jason Greaves (ENG)	309
414	Darren Mirza (ENG)	308
415	Peter Peratikou (ENG)	305
416	Timothy Paling (ENG)	305
417	unknown (Note: Player is skipped in the Snooker Scene source; Pot Black only lists the top 250.)	
418	Michael Kirkham (ENG)	300
419	Paul Maskell (ENG)	300
420	Chris Archer (ENG)	298
421	Chris Carpenter (ENG)	295
422	Stuart Pegrum (ENG)	295
423	Simon Morfitt (ENG)	282
424	Damon Zeid (ENG)	281
425	Daniele Zagaroli (ITA)	280
426	Trevor Holtby (ENG)	280
427	Jimmy O'Shea (ENG)	275
428	Kevin Johnstone (ENG)	271
429	Stephen Kershaw (ENG)	270
430	Steve Gough (ENG)	270
431	Gregg Tugby (ENG)	270
432	John Bedford (ENG)	266
433	Chris Milner (ENG)	266
434	Ann-Marie Farren (ENG)	265
435	Tom Bell (ENG)	260
436	Darren Paris (SUI)	260
437	Edvard Matthiasson (ISL)	260
438	Kevin McCallum (ENG)	256
439	James Gibson (ENG)	256
440	Brian Smits (NED)	256
441	David Mellon (ENG)	251
442	Iain Trimble (ENG)	250
443	Jimmy Singh (ENG)	247
444	Daniel Haenga (NZL)	246
445	Ramu Vaswani (ENG)	246
446	Andrew Radford (ENG)	244
447	Marc Devon (ENG)	unknown
448	Ryan Michael (ENG)	238
449	John Clouden (ENG)	235
450	Derek Turner (ENG)	235
451	Darren Dodd (ENG)	234
452	Stephen Kiddle (ENG)	232
453	Matt Bayley (ENG)	228
454	David Thompson (ENG)	226
455	Graham Miles (ENG)	220
456	Stan Haslam (ENG)	220
457	Frank Fitzgerald (ENG)	219
458	Julian Mills (ENG)	218
459	Damian Massey (ENG)	218
460	Chris Achilles (ENG)	214
461	Robert Thallon (SCO)	214
462	Lee Marney (ENG)	210
463	Matthew McGrotty (ENG)	210
464	Peter Kippie (CAN)	209
465	Andrew Craig (ENG)	208
466	Del Smith (ENG)	205
467	Peter Delaney (ENG)	201
468	Neil Wood (ENG)	200
469	Zealand Mark (NZL)	200
470	Martin Lee (ENG)	195
471	Kieran McMahon (NIR)	190
472	Mark Ganderton (ENG)	189
473	Bjorn Haneveer (BEL)	188
474	Paul Hurren (ENG)	187
475	Andrew Clark (ENG)	183
476	Barry O'Loughlin (IRL)	182
477	Craig McDonald (SCO)	178
478	Daniel Gimenez (AUS)	176
479	John Benton (IRL)	174
480	Chris Taylor (ENG)	168
481	Daniel Buskin (ENG)	166
482	Luke Spiller (ENG)	165
483	Clive Bernstone (ENG)	161
484	Mario Morra (CAN)	160
485	Andrew Fisher (ENG)	160
486	Ian Barry Stark (ENG)	160
487	George Scott (ENG)	160
488	Sacha Journet (ENG)	158
489	Dennis Hughes (ENG)	155
490	Neil Hoggarth (ENG)	154
491	Matthew Farrant (WAL)	152
492	Philip Freeman (ENG)	150
493	Shaun Berry (ENG)	148
494	Roberto Frezza (ITA)	146
495	Jonathan White (ENG)	146
496	Mark Peevers (ENG)	140
497	Simon Westcott (ENG)	140
498	Mario Vassallo (MLT)	138
499	Scott Rigg (ENG)	138
500	Christopher Booth (ENG)	135
501	Mike Russell (ENG)	135
502	Mike Watterson (ENG)	135
503	Alex Coutts (SCO)	134
504	John Horsfall (CAN)	133
505	Simon Smith (ENG)	130
506	Rory Mallon (ENG)	126
507	Stephen Waldron (ENG)	124
508	Donald Newcombe (WAL)	124
509	Andrea Barbacane (ITA)	121
510	Anthony Corina (ENG)	120
511	Huseyin Hursid (TUR)	119
512	Tony Brown (ENG)	118
513	Duncan Moore (ENG)	112
514	Neil Johnson (ENG)	112
515	Mark Taylor (ENG)	110
516	Darren Shaw (ENG)	108
517	Gareth Esprit (ENG)	106
518	Neil Davies (ENG)	106
519	Darren Skinner (ENG)	105
520	Peter Williams (WAL)	105
521	Craig Glanville (ENG)	104
522	Jeffrey Moore (ENG)	102
523	Jerry Williams (ENG)	100
524	Luke Roberts (ENG)	94
525	Paul Dawson (ENG)	90
526	Nicholas Segal (ENG)	90
527	Mohammed Shazi (ENG)	89
528	Gary Skipworth (ENG)	89
529	Paul Lloyd (ENG)	88
530	Matt Bailey (ENG)	88
531	Chris Gill (ENG)	86
532	Paul Sweeny (ENG)	80
533	Wim Braam (NED)	80
534	Ross Mabbott (ENG)	80
535	Paul Lovegrove (ENG)	80
536	Paul Moss (ENG)	80
537	James McGouran (ENG)	78
538	Lun Wai Lee (ENG)	78
539	Alan Brookes (ENG)	76
540	Ahmed Hussein Gamal (EGY)	76
541	Gary Natale (CAN)	75
542	Ronnie Shakespeare (ENG)	73
543	Ismail Yildiran (ENG)	66
544	Chris O'Sullivan (ENG)	64
545	Keith Moore (ENG)	64
546	Paul Thomerson (ENG)	64
547	John Mullane (ENG)	58
548	Frank Smith (ENG)	57
549	Alex Peart (JAM)	56
550	Mark Faulkner (ENG)	55
551	Colin Mitchell (ENG)	53
552	Anthony Bridge (ENG)	52
553	Bernard Bennett (ENG)	50
554	Andreas Ahmed (ENG)	48
555	Dean Bracey (ENG)	48
556	Geoff Grennan (ENG)	48
557	Joe Patterson (SCO)	46
558	Charles Vos (CAN)	44
559	Barry Zee (SGP)	38
560	Miles Green (ENG)	36

Preceded by 1993–94	1994–95	Succeeded by 1995–96
