= 1992–93 snooker season =

Details
- Duration: August 1992 – 30 May 1993
- Tournaments: 27 (9 ranking events)

Triple Crown winners
- UK Championship: (England) Jimmy White
- Masters: (Scotland) Stephen Hendry
- World Championship: (Scotland) Stephen Hendry

The 1992–93 snooker season was a series of snooker tournaments played between August 1992 and May 1993. The following table outlines the results for ranking, minor-ranking and the invitational events.

== New professional players ==
The World Professional Billiards and Snooker Association accepted its largest intake to date, 154 new players, bringing the total to 719 (excluding 27 billiards-only members). The new professionals included world amateur champion Noppadon Noppachorn, world under-21 champion Ronnie O'Sullivan, John Higgins (who won the junior event at the 1991 World Masters), Indian amateur champion Yasin Merchant, the fifth-ranked women's player Tessa Davidson.

== Calendar ==
Start	Finish	Country	Tournament name	Venue	City	Winner	Runner-up	Score	Ref.
1 Aug	22 Aug	IND	Indian Masters		Delhi	(England) Steve Davis	(England) Steve James	9–6	
26 Aug	30 Aug	CHN	Kent Classic	Haidian Stadium	Beijing	(England) John Parrott	(Scotland) Stephen Hendry	6–5	
2 Sep	5 Sep	ENG	Pot Black	Norbreck Castle Hotel	Blackpool	(England) Neal Foulds	(Thailand) James Wattana	1–0	
23 Sep	27 Sep	SCO	Scottish Masters	Civic Centre	Motherwell	(England) Neal Foulds	(England) Gary Wilkinson	10–8	
3 Oct	9 Oct	UAE	Dubai Classic	Al Nasr Stadium	Dubai	(England) John Parrott	(Scotland) Stephen Hendry	9–8	
12 Oct	25 Oct	ENG	Grand Prix	Hexagon Theatre	Reading	(England) Jimmy White	(Republic of Ireland) Ken Doherty	10–9	
28 Oct	1 Nov	BEL	Belgian Masters	Matchroom Schijnpoort	Antwerp	(Thailand) James Wattana	(England) John Parrott	10–5	
26 Oct	5 Nov	SCO	Benson & Hedges Championship	Masters Club	Glasgow	(Scotland) Chris Small	(Scotland) Alan McManus	9–1	
13 Nov	29 Nov	ENG	UK Championship	Guild Hall	Preston	(England) Jimmy White	(England) John Parrott	16–9	
4 Dec	12 Dec	ENG	World Matchplay	The Dome	Doncaster	(Thailand) James Wattana	(England) Steve Davis	9–4	
? Dec	20 Dec	THA	King's Cup	Channel 9 Auditorium	Bangkok	(England) Nigel Bond	(Thailand) James Wattana	8–7	
12 Dec	21 Dec	ENG	Strachan Challenge – Event 1	Jimmy White Snooker Lodge	Aldershot	(Northern Ireland) Joe Swail	(Netherlands) Stefan Mazrocis	9–4	
8 Jan	10 Jan	THA	Nescafe Extra Challenge		Bangkok	(England) Ronnie O'Sullivan	(Thailand) James Wattana	(Note: No play-off was played, and the winner was decided via a league format.)	
3 Jan	12 Jan	ENG	Strachan Challenge – Event 2	Radion Plaxa Club	Sheffield	(England) Troy Shaw	(England) Nigel Bond	9–4	
15 Jan	16 Jan	FRA	European Challenge		Epernay	(Scotland) Stephen Hendry	(Malta) Tony Drago	5–3	
21 Jan	31 Jan	WAL	Welsh Open	Newport Centre	Newport	(Republic of Ireland) Ken Doherty	(Scotland) Alan McManus	9–7	
1 Feb	6 Feb	ENG	Strachan Challenge – Event 3	Jimmy White Snooker Lodge	Aldershot	(Malta) Tony Drago	(Republic of Ireland) Ken Doherty	9–7	
7 Feb	14 Feb	ENG	The Masters	Wembley Conference Centre	London	(Scotland) Stephen Hendry	(Thailand) James Wattana	9–5	
15 Feb	21 Feb	BEL	European Open	Matchroon Schijnpoort	Antwerp	(England) Steve Davis	(Scotland) Stephen Hendry	10–4	
22 Feb	6 Mar	ENG	British Open	Assembly Rooms	Derby	(England) Steve Davis	(Thailand) James Wattana	10–2	
13 Mar	20 Mar	THA	Asian Open	Imperial Queens Park Hotel	Bangkok	(England) Dave Harold	(Wales) Darren Morgan	9–3	
23 Mar	28 Mar	IRL	Irish Masters	Goff's	Kill	(England) Steve Davis	(Scotland) Alan McManus	9–4	
2 Apr	11 Apr	ENG	International Open	Plymouth Pavilions	Plymouth	(Scotland) Stephen Hendry	(England) Steve Davis	10–6	
17 Apr	3 May	ENG	World Snooker Championship	Crucible Theatre	Sheffield	(Scotland) Stephen Hendry	(England) Jimmy White	18–5	
8 May	15 May	WAL	Pontins Professional	Pontins	Prestatyn	(Republic of Ireland) Ken Doherty	(Wales) Darren Morgan	9–3	
16 May	20 May	IRL	Irish Professional Championship	Jury's Hotel	Cork	(Republic of Ireland) Ken Doherty	(Republic of Ireland) Stephen Murphy	9–2	
3 Jan	30 May	ENG	European League	Thornbury Leisure Centre	Bristol	(England) Jimmy White	(Scotland) Alan McManus	10–7	

Ranking event
Minor-ranking event
Non-ranking event

== Official rankings ==
The top 16 of the world rankings, these players automatically played in the final rounds of the world ranking events and were invited for the Masters.

No.	Ch.	Name
1	Steady	(Scotland) Stephen Hendry
2	▲	(England) John Parrott
3	Steady	(England) Jimmy White
4	▼	(England) Steve Davis
5	▲	(England) Neal Foulds
6	▲	(Wales) Terry Griffiths
7	▲	(Thailand) James Wattana
8	▼	(England) Gary Wilkinson
9	▲	(England) Nigel Bond
10	▼	(England) Steve James
11	▼	(Northern Ireland) Dennis Taylor
12	▲	(England) Martin Clark
13	▲	(Scotland) Alan McManus
14	▼	(Canada) Alain Robidoux
15	▲	(England) Willie Thorne
16	▲	(Wales) Darren Morgan
