= 1996 Finnish Masters =

Invitational snooker tournament

Tournament information
- Venue: Hesperia Hotel, Helsinki
- Country: Finland
- Format: Non-ranking event
- Winner's share: £4,000

Final
- Champion: Rod Lawler (ENG)
- Runner-up: Stefan Mazrocis (ENG)
- Score: 6–2

The 1996 Finnish Masters was an invitational non-ranking snooker tournament held at the Hesperia Hotel, Helsinki, Finland in 1996. Rod Lawler won the tournament defeating Stefan Mazrocis 6–2 in the final, and took the first prize of £4,000.

== Results ==
Last 16; Best of 9 frames
(England) Rod Lawler	5
(Finland) Robin Hull	4
(Finland) Markku Hamalainen	5
(England) David Gray	4
(Wales) Paul Davies	5
(Finland) Risto Vayrynen	3
(England) Alfie Burden	5
(Malta) Ray Demanuele	2
(England) Stefan Mazrocis	5
(Finland) Mika Hummelin	0
(Thailand) Suriya Suwannasingh	5
(Finland) Seppo Koskinen	0
(Republic of Ireland) Fergal O'Brien	5
(England) Eddie Manning	1
(England) Surinder Gill	5
(Scotland) Richy McDonald	4

Quarter-finals; Best of 9 frames
(England) Rod Lawler	5
(Finland) Markku Hamalainen	1
(Wales) Paul Davies	5
(England) Alfie Burden	4
(England) Stefan Mazrocis	5
(Thailand) Suriya Suwannasingh	1
(Republic of Ireland) Fergal O'Brien	5
(England) Surinder Gill	0

Semi-finals; Best of 9 frames
(England) Rod Lawler	5
(Wales) Paul Davies	2
(England) Stefan Mazrocis	5
(Republic of Ireland) Fergal O'Brien	2

Final; Best of 11 frames
(England) Rod Lawler	6
(England) Stefan Mazrocis	2
