= 1996 Asian Classic =

Asian Classic
Tournament information
- Dates: 9–15 September 1996
- Venue: Riverside Montien Hotel
- City: Bangkok
- Country: Thailand
- Organisation: WPBSA
- Format: Ranking event
- Winner's share: £40,000

Final
- Champion: Ronnie O'Sullivan (ENG)
- Runner-up: Brian Morgan (ENG)
- Score: 9–8

The 1996 Suntory Asian Classic was a professional ranking snooker tournament that took place between 9–15 September 1996 at the Riverside Montien Hotel in Bangkok, Thailand.

Ronnie O'Sullivan won the tournament, defeating Brian Morgan 9–8 in the final. The defending champion John Parrott was eliminated by Rod Lawler in the first round.

== Wildcard round ==
Match		Score	
WC1	Karl Burrows (ENG)	5–3	Anan Terananon (THA)
WC2	Stefan Mazrocis (ENG)	5–0	Amnuayporn Chotipong (THA)
WC3	Stephen Murphy (IRL)	5–0	Sakchai Sim Ngam (THA)
WC4	Surathep Phuchulaem (THA)	5–4	Jason Wallace (ENG)

== Main draw ==
Last 32; Best of 9 frames
(England) Ronnie O'Sullivan	5
(England) Steve James	3
(Canada) Alain Robidoux	5
(England) Martin Clark	4
(England) Peter Ebdon	5
(England) Neal Foulds	4
(Wales) Mark Williams	5
(England) Willie Thorne	4
(Scotland) Alan McManus	5
(Republic of Ireland) Fergal O'Brien	3
(England) Gary Wilkinson	5
(Thailand) James Wattana	4
(England) Steve Davis	5
(Republic of Ireland) Stephen Murphy	2
(England) Rod Lawler	5
(England) John Parrott	2
(England) Brian Morgan	5
(England) Jimmy White	3
(Scotland) Stephen Hendry	5
(England) Stephen Lee	0
(Malta) Tony Drago	5
(Thailand) Surathep Phuchulaem	2
(England) Nigel Bond	5
(England) Anthony Hamilton	4
(Republic of Ireland) Ken Doherty	5
(England) Dean Reynolds	2
(England) Dave Harold	5
(England) Jason Ferguson	0
(England) Stefan Mazrocis	5
(Wales) Darren Morgan	4
(England) Karl Burrows	5
(Scotland) John Higgins	0

Last 16; Best of 9 frames
(England) Ronnie O'Sullivan	5
(Canada) Alain Robidoux	4
(England) Peter Ebdon	5
(Wales) Mark Williams	1
(Scotland) Alan McManus	5
(England) Gary Wilkinson	4
(England) Steve Davis	5
(England) Rod Lawler	3
(England) Brian Morgan	5
(Scotland) Stephen Hendry	3
(Malta) Tony Drago	5
(England) Nigel Bond	1
(Republic of Ireland) Ken Doherty	5
(England) Dave Harold	2
(England) Stefan Mazrocis	5
(England) Karl Burrows	1

Quarter-finals; Best of 9 frames
(England) Ronnie O'Sullivan	5
(England) Peter Ebdon	4
(Scotland) Alan McManus	5
(England) Steve Davis	4
(England) Brian Morgan	5
(Malta) Tony Drago	4
(Republic of Ireland) Ken Doherty	5
(England) Stefan Mazrocis	4

Semi-finals; Best of 9 frames
(England) Ronnie O'Sullivan	5
(Scotland) Alan McManus	4
(England) Brian Morgan	5
(Republic of Ireland) Ken Doherty	1

Final; Best of 17 frames
(England) Ronnie O'Sullivan	9
(England) Brian Morgan	8
