= Troy Shaw =

English snooker player

Personal information
- Born: 6 October 1969 (age 57) Lowestoft, Suffolk, England

Sport
- Country: England
- Sport: Snooker
- Professional: 1991–2003
- Highest ranking: 74 (1994/95)
- Best ranking finish: Last 16 (x1)

Tournament wins
- Minor-ranking: 1

Troy Shaw (born 6 October 1969) is an English former professional snooker player.

== Career ==
Competing on the main tour from 1991, Shaw won the second leg of minor ranking tournament the Strachan Challenge in 1993, beating Nigel Bond in the final. He reached his highest ranking, 74th, the following year. At the end of the 2002–03 snooker season, Shaw was ranked 94th and did not qualify to remain on the professional tour.

== Performance and rankings timeline ==
Tournament	1991/ 92	1992/ 93	1993/ 94	1994/ 95	1995/ 96	1996/ 97	1997/ 98	1998/ 99	1999/ 00	2000/ 01	2001/ 02	2002/ 03	2003/ 04
Ranking	(Note: New players on the Main Tour don't have a ranking.)	121	77	74	125	133	131	88	96	116	97	83	(Note: He was not on the Main Tour.)
Ranking tournaments
LG Cup (Note: The event was previously known as the Grand Prix (1990/1991–2000/2001))	LQ	LQ	LQ	LQ	LQ	LQ	1R	LQ	LQ	LQ	LQ	LQ	A
British Open	1R	3R	LQ	LQ	LQ	LQ	LQ	LQ	LQ	1R	LQ	LQ	A
UK Championship	LQ	LQ	1R	LQ	LQ	LQ	1R	LQ	LQ	LQ	LQ	LQ	A
Welsh Open	LQ	LQ	LQ	1R	LQ	LQ	LQ	LQ	1R	LQ	LQ	LQ	A
European Open (Note: The event was previously known as the Irish Open (1998/1999))	1R	LQ	LQ	LQ	LQ	LQ	NH	LQ	Not Held		LQ	LQ	A
Irish Masters	Non-Ranking Event											LQ	A
Players Championship (Note: The event was also known as the International Open (1992/1993–1996/1997) and the Scottish Open (1997/1998–2002/2003))	NH	1R	LQ	LQ	LQ	LQ	2R	LQ	LQ	LQ	LQ	LQ	A
World Championship	LQ	LQ	LQ	LQ	LQ	LQ	LQ	LQ	LQ	LQ	LQ	LQ	LQ
Non-ranking tournaments
The Masters	LQ	LQ	LQ	LQ	LQ	LQ	LQ	LQ	LQ	LQ	LQ	A	A
Former ranking tournaments
Classic	LQ	Tournament Not Held											
Strachan Open (Note: The event was also known as the Strachan Challenge (1992/1993–1993/1994))	LQ	MR	NR	Tournament Not Held									
Dubai Classic (Note: The event was also known as the Thailand Classic (1995/1996) and Asian Classic (1996/1997))	LQ	1R	LQ	LQ	LQ	LQ	Tournament Not Held						
German Open	Tournament Not Held				LQ	LQ	LQ	NR	Tournament Not Held				
Malta Grand Prix	Not Held			Non-Ranking Event					LQ	NR	Not Held		
China Open (Note: The event was also known as the China International (1997/1998–1998/1999))	Tournament Not Held						NR	LQ	LQ	LQ	LQ	Not Held	
Thailand Masters (Note: The event was also known as the Asian Open (1991/1992–1992/1993) and Thailand Open (1993/1994–1996/97))	LQ	LQ	LQ	LQ	LQ	LQ	LQ	LQ	LQ	LQ	LQ	NR	NH

Performance Table Legend
LQ	lost in the qualifying draw	#R	lost in the early rounds of the tournament (WR = Wildcard round, RR = Round robin)	QF	lost in the quarter-finals
SF	lost in the semi–finals	F	lost in the final	W	won the tournament
DNQ	did not qualify for the tournament	A	did not participate in the tournament	WD	withdrew from the tournament
DQ	disqualified from the tournament				

NH / Not Held	event was not held.
NR / Non-Ranking Event	event is/was no longer a ranking event.
R / Ranking Event	event is/was a ranking event.
MR / Minor-Ranking Event	means an event is/was a minor-ranking event.
PA / Pro-am Event	means an event is/was a pro-am event.

== Career finals ==
=== Minor-ranking finals: 1 (1 title) ===
Outcome	Year	Championship	Opponent in the final	Score
Winner	1993	Strachan Challenge – Event 2	(England) Nigel Bond	9–4

=== Pro-am finals: 2 (1 title) ===
Outcome	Year	Championship	Opponent in the final	Score
Runner-up	1990	Kuedos Invitational	(Thailand) James Wattana	3–5
Winner	2006	Hall Green Pro-Am	(England) Mark Sutton	4–3
