= Rod Lawler =

English snooker player (born 1971)

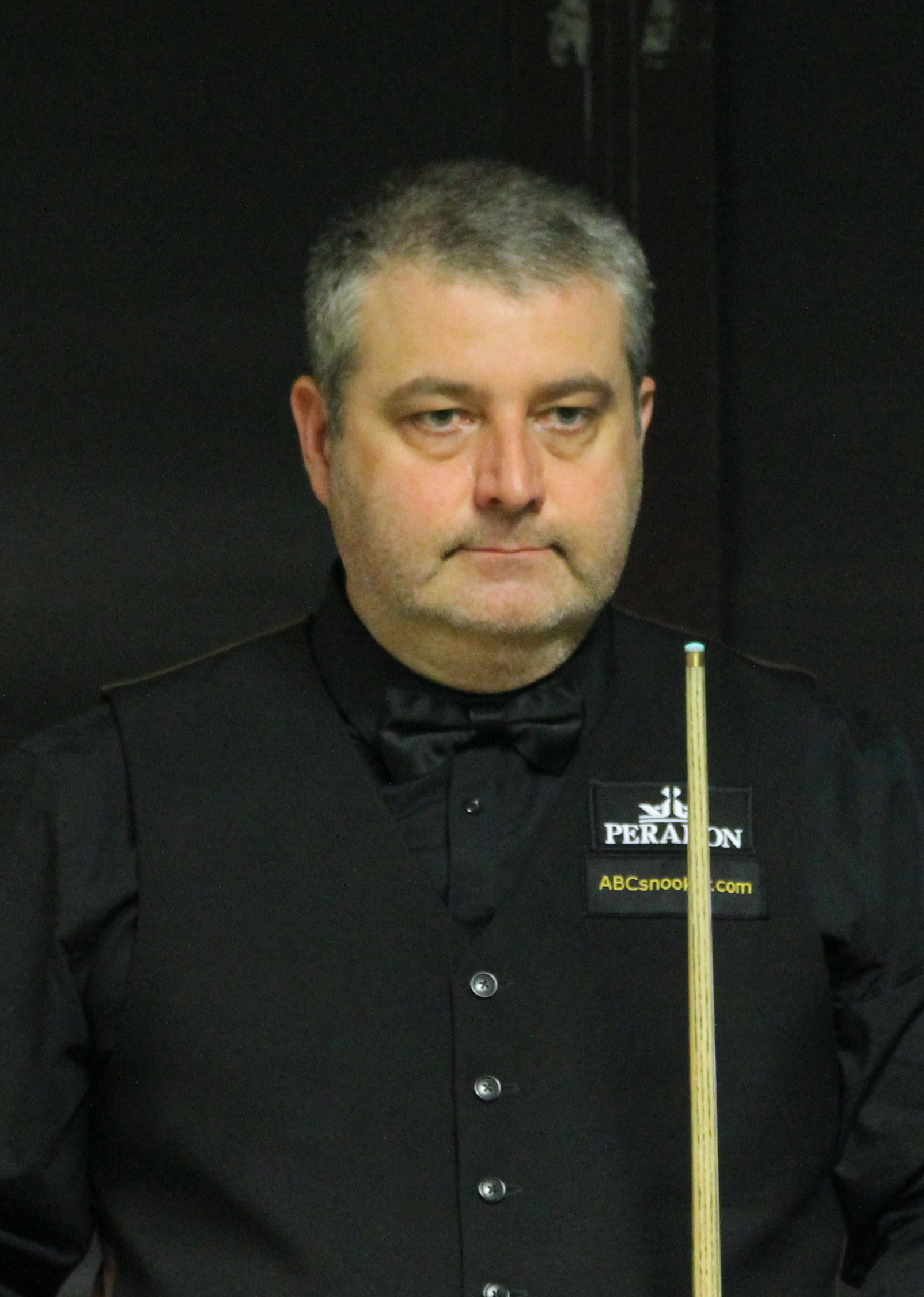
- Lawler at the 2016 Paul Hunter Classic

Personal information
- Nickname: Rod the Plod
- Born: 12 July 1971 (age 55) Liverpool, Lancashire, England

Sport
- Country: England
- Sport: Snooker
- Professional: 1990–2021, 2022–2024
- Highest ranking: 20 (1996/1997)
- Century breaks: 114
- Best ranking finish: Runner-up (x1)

Tournament wins
- Minor-ranking: 1

Rod Lawler (born 12 July 1971) is an English former professional snooker player. He is noted for his slow playing style which gave rise to his nickname, "Rod the Plod".

After turning professional in 1990, Lawler reached one ranking tournament final, the 1996 International Open, where he lost 3–9 to John Higgins, and won one minor-ranking tournament, Event 3 of the 2012/2013 Players Tour Championship, where he defeated Marco Fu 4–2 in the final.

Lawler compiled over 100 competitive century breaks during his career. His highest is a 143, in qualifying for the 2003 World Championship. He fell off the tour at the end of the 2023-24 snooker season.

== Career ==
=== Early career ===
Lawler turned professional in 1990. His first season proved to be quite successful as he reached the last 32 in the Dubai Classic, losing out 2–5 to former World Billiards Champion Rex Williams. He then followed this up with a run to the Quarter Finals of the Classic, beating John Virgo 5–3 to qualify, as well as Joe Johnson 5–3 in the second round, before losing 2–5 to Mike Hallett. His best run in a ranking tournament was in 1996, when he reached the final of the International Open, beating World Champion Stephen Hendry 5–3 in the second round, but his run ended in the final where he lost 9–3 to John Higgins.

He also reached the final of the 1994 Benson and Hedges Championship, losing 5–9 to Mark Williams in the Final.

In 1995, Lawler reached the semi-final of the Malta Masters, beating future UK Champion Matthew Stevens in the Quarter Final, however he lost in the semi-final to the home favourite Tony Drago. He followed up this result by reaching the last 16 of the Grand Prix, beating the aforementioned Tony Drago in the last 32, before being whitewashed 5–0 by Stephen Hendry.

Lawler has qualified for the final stages of the World Championship on two occasions, the first being in 1995, where he beat a young Marcus Campbell in qualifying, before losing to Peter Ebdon in the last 32 at the Crucible. He qualified again in 1996, beating former World Champion Dennis Taylor in the final qualifying round. At the Crucible he then beat 1991 World Champion John Parrott 10–6, before losing in the last 16 to Dave Harold by 13 frames to 6. This was, to date, his best World Championship performance.

In 1997, Lawler reached the semi-final of the Benson and Hedges Championship, losing a final frame decider against Andy Hicks.

His best result in the UK Championship came in 1998, where he beat Jamie Burnett and John Read, before losing to Matthew Stevens in the last 16.

Lawler also reached the Quarter Finals of the 2003 Welsh Open, beating players such as Stephen Maguire, Jimmy White and Michael Holt before losing 2–5 to seven time World Champion Stephen Hendry

=== Recent years ===
Lawler narrowly missed out on a place in the last 32 in the 2009 China Open, winning three qualifying matches, the last of which was against Matthew Stevens, to reach the venue in Beijing, only to lose 3–5 to local wildcard Yu Delu. In 2010 however, Lawler did reach the last 32 of the China Open, winning three qualifying matches against Matthew Selt, Dominic Dale, and Ricky Walden. Also defeating wildcard Supoj Saenla 5–3, before losing to then number 8 seed Mark Selby

The 2011–12 was a disastrous season for Lawler. He reached the third qualifying round in three ranking events. Apart from that he lost a lot of matches which then proved quite costly at the end of the season as he finished ranked 73, losing his place on the main tour. He then entered the 2012 Q School and reached the semi-finals of Event 3 by beating another former professional Joe Delaney to regain his tour place for the next two seasons.

Lawler had a great start to the 2012–13 season as he won all four matches to qualify for the Wuxi Classic. At the venue he defeated Li Hang and Stephen Maguire to reach the last 16 where he was narrowly beaten 4–5 by Graeme Dott. In September he won his first professional title at the UK PTC 3 event defeating Marco Fu 4–2 in the final in Gloucester, Beating the likes of Stuart Bingham, Stephen Lee and Dominic Dale en route to the final.

Following his Gloucester success, he continued to perform well, reaching the final qualifying round of both the UK Championship and Haikou World Open tournaments, with his results enough to move him back inside the top 64 provisionally.

His victory over Fu at the UK PTC along with a semi-final run in the European Tour 2012/2013 – Event 6 meant that he qualified for the PTC Finals ranked 7th on the Order of Merit. At the venue in Galway he beat Cao Yupeng by a 4–2 scoreline, only to lose to Kurt Maflin in the last 16 by 4 frames to 3, having led throughout the match.

At the 2013 World Championship, Lawler beat Scottish Amateur Fraser Patrick 10–5, he then resisted an admirable fightback to beat Anthony McGill 10–9, after being 7–2 and 8–3 up. However, in the final qualifying round, he lost 7–10 to World number 21 Martin Gould, despite being 5–2 up at one point in the match, however, the progression to the final qualifying round netted him £8,200.

Lawler earned £49,050 during the 2012–13 snooker season. He also made 15 century breaks, more than in any previous season.

=== 2013/2014 season ===
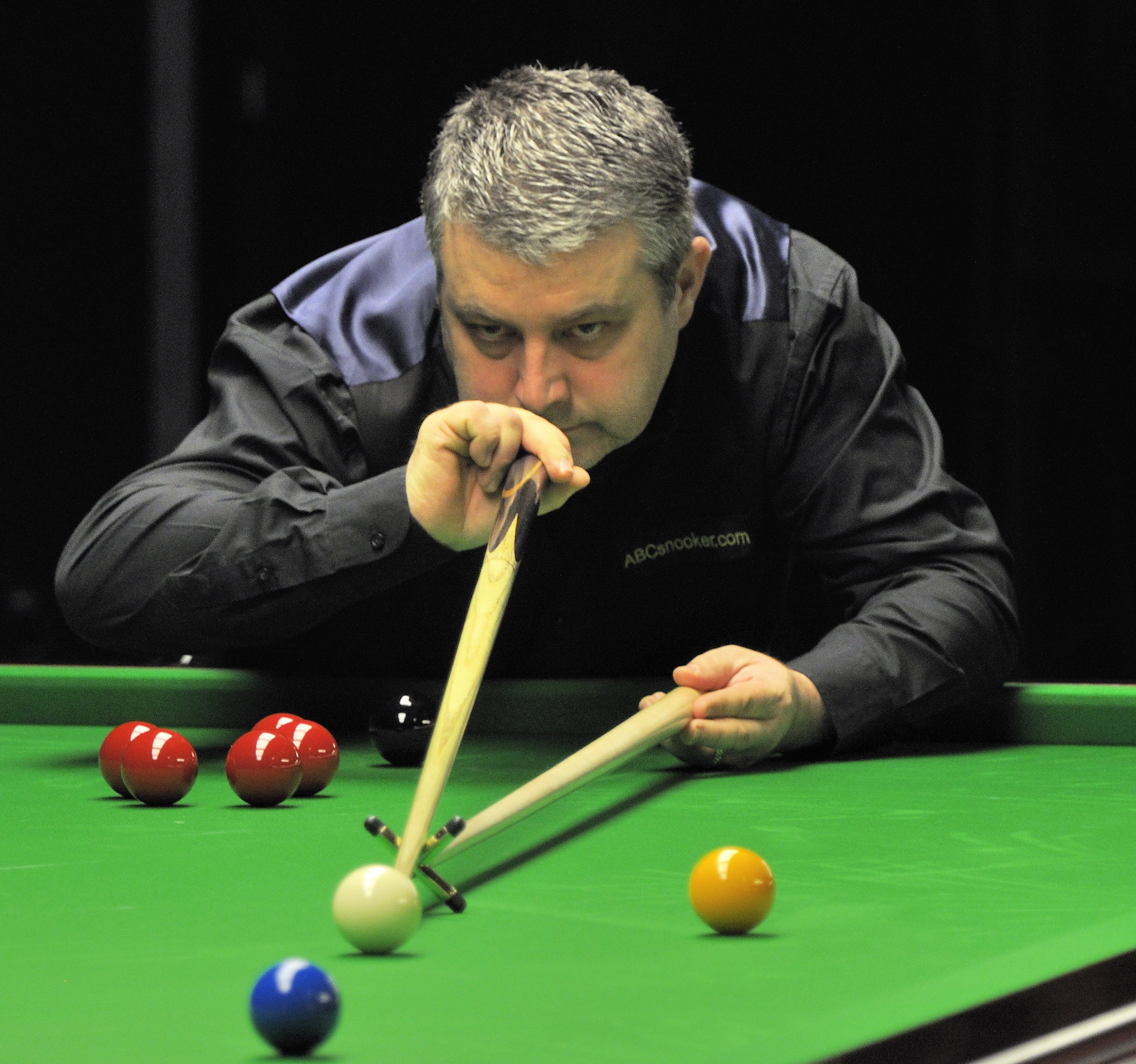
Rod Lawler at 2014 German Masters

At the Start of the 2013–14, Lawler was ranked 59th in the World rankings. In the qualifiers for the 2013 Wuxi Classic, Lawler lost his qualifying match 2–5 against Chinese youngster Lyu Haotian. In the qualifiers for the Australian Goldfields Open, Lawler lost his opening match in the last 96 to Scotsman Ross Muir 1–5. Lawler lost his opening game in the Shanghai Masters 1–5 to Mohamed Khairy. Lawler ended this run of bad results to beat Jak Jones 4–0 to qualify for the inaugural Indian Open. He defeated Indian wildcard Kamal Chalwa 4–1, before receiving a bye to the last 32, due to the withdrawal of Ali Carter, however, he was defeated 2–4 by Neil Robertson. He followed this up with a run to the last 16 of the third European Tour event, beating James Cahill, Liam Highfield and John Higgins before losing to Mark Allen 2–4. Lawler also qualified for the International Championship, beating Ian Burns 6–4 in qualifying, he then beat Aditya Mehta 6–4, before losing 4–6 to Fergal O'Brien in the last 32. Lawler lost in the last 64 of the UK Championship, having defeated Thanawat Thirapongpaiboon 6–3, before losing 1–6 to John Higgins, he also qualified for the German Masters, defeating Mitchell Travis 5–1 in qualifying. He also qualified for the World Open, this time defeating Elliot Slessor, also by a 5–1 scoreline.

=== 2014/2015 season ===
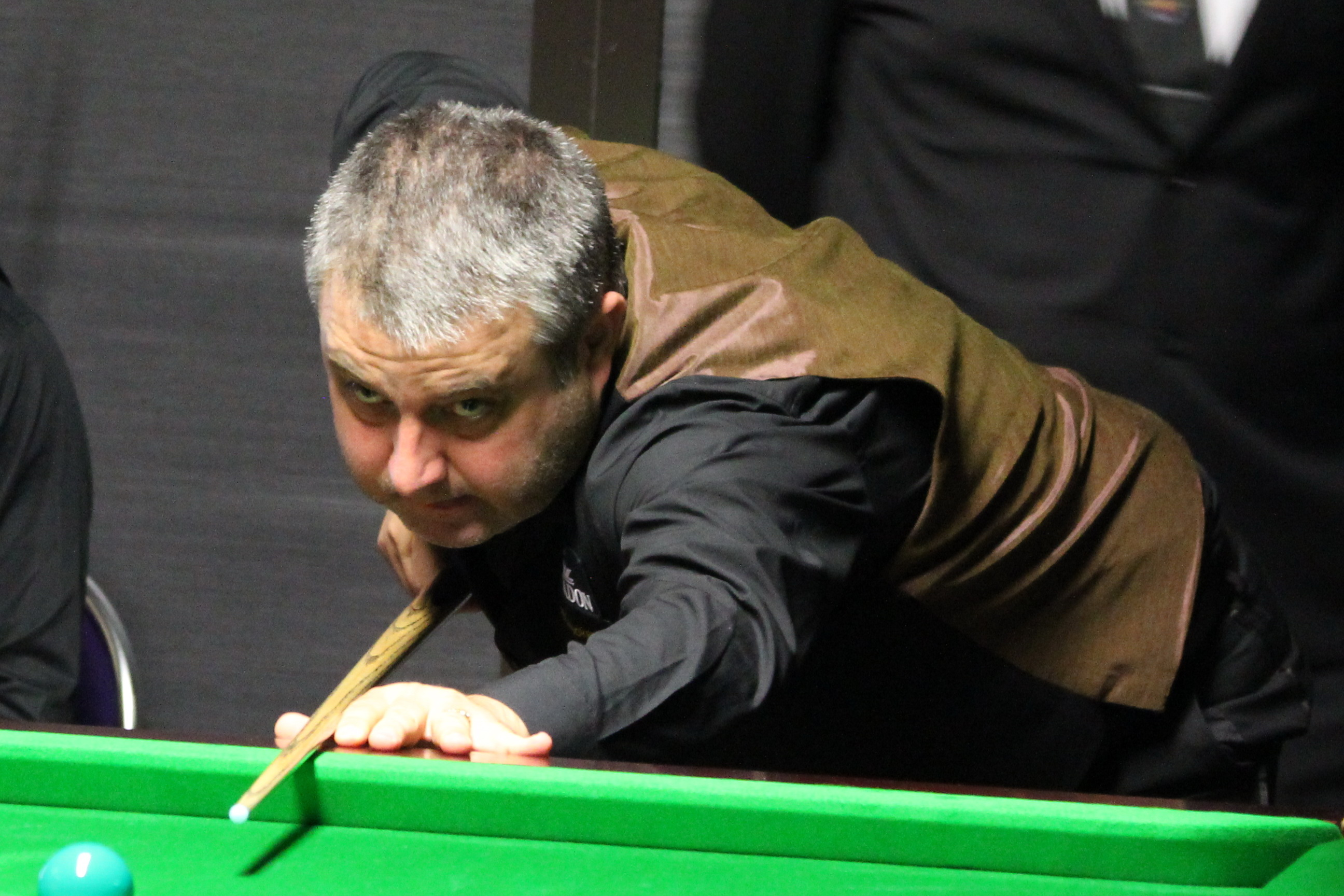
2016 Paul Hunter Classic

Lawler qualified for the first ranking tournament of the season, the Wuxi Classic, beating Vinnie Calabrese 5–3. In the first round proper, he faced Shaun Murphy who won the match 5–1. Lawler failed to qualify for both the Shanghai Masters and the Australian Goldfields Open but then reached the semi-finals of the second Euro Tour (PTC) event, eventually losing 3–4 to Mark Allen in a deciding frame. A solid run of results followed, reaching a quarter-final in PTC4 where he eventually lost 3–4 to Robert Milkins, and also reaching the fourth round of the UK Championship where he pulled one back against Mark Allen by beating him 6–4 in the third round, eventually losing 3–6 to Judd Trump. Lawler failed to achieve another deep run in a tournament for the rest of the season, but was consistent in qualifying for the main stages of ranking tournaments, and therefore accumulated enough prize money to finish 39th on the rankings list at the end of the season.

=== 2018/2019 season ===
In November 2018, after winning his first round match against Anthony Hamilton at the UK Championships, Lawler was criticised for his slow play by World Snooker Chairman Barry Hearn taking an average of 39.8s per shot. Despite this, he reached the quarter final of the Shootout, where players have a limited time (15 seconds for the first five minutes; ten seconds thereafter) to play each shot.

=== 2022/2023 season ===
Lawler regained his Main Tour Card in May 2022 by qualifying through the first Q School event at Sheffield. The final qualifying round saw him beat Brandon Sargeant 4–3 which earned him a two year card.

== Performance and rankings timeline ==
Tournament	1990/ 91	1991/ 92	1992/ 93	1993/ 94	1994/ 95	1995/ 96	1996/ 97	1997/ 98	1998/ 99	1999/ 00	2000/ 01	2001/ 02	2002/ 03	2003/ 04	2004/ 05	2005/ 06	2006/ 07	2007/ 08	2008/ 09	2009/ 10	2010/ 11	2011/ 12	2012/ 13	2013/ 14	2014/ 15	2015/ 16	2016/ 17	2017/ 18	2018/ 19	2019/ 20	2020/ 21	2021/ 22	2022/ 23	2023/ 24
Ranking (Note: From the 2010/2011 season it shows the ranking at the beginning of the season)	(Note: New players don't have a ranking)	54	45	45	45	40	20	26	40	51	51	64	66	53	57	60	46	49	60	61	49	58	(Note: Players qualified through Q School started the season without ranking points)	59	39	39	47	(Note: Players qualified through the One Year Ranking List started the season without ranking points)	94		81	(Note: He was an amateur)		85
Ranking tournaments
Championship League	Tournament Not Held																	Non-Ranking Event													RR	RR	RR	RR
European Masters (Note: The event was called the European Open (1990/1991–1996/1997 and 2001/2002–2003/2004), Irish Open (1998/1999) and the Malta Cup (2004/2005–2007/2008))	1R	1R	2R	LQ	LQ	LQ	1R	NH	LQ	Not Held		LQ	LQ	LQ	LQ	LQ	1R	NR	Tournament Not Held								LQ	LQ	LQ	LQ	1R	A	LQ	LQ
British Open	LQ	LQ	LQ	2R	LQ	1R	WD	3R	LQ	LQ	LQ	LQ	LQ	LQ	LQ	Tournament Not Held																A	LQ	2R
English Open	Tournament Not Held																										2R	1R	1R	1R	1R	A	LQ	LQ
Wuhan Open	Tournament Not Held																																	1R
Northern Ireland Open	Tournament Not Held																										1R	1R	1R	2R	2R	A	LQ	1R
International Championship	Tournament Not Held																						LQ	2R	3R	1R	1R	LQ	LQ	LQ	Not Held			LQ
UK Championship	1R	2R	LQ	1R	1R	LQ	2R	1R	3R	LQ	1R	LQ	LQ	LQ	LQ	LQ	2R	LQ	LQ	LQ	LQ	LQ	LQ	2R	4R	1R	2R	1R	2R	1R	1R	A	LQ	LQ
Shoot Out	Tournament Not Held																		Non-Ranking Event								1R	3R	QF	1R	1R	1R	1R	1R
Scottish Open (Note: The event run under different names as International Open (1992/1993–1996/1997) and Players Championship (2003/2004))	Not Held		LQ	1R	1R	F	1R	1R	1R	1R	LQ	LQ	LQ	2R	Tournament Not Held								MR	Not Held			1R	1R	1R	1R	1R	A	LQ	LQ
World Grand Prix	Tournament Not Held																								NR	DNQ	DNQ	DNQ	DNQ	DNQ	DNQ	DNQ	DNQ	DNQ
German Masters (Note: The event run under different name as German Open (1995/1996–1997/1998))	Tournament Not Held					QF	LQ	LQ	NR	Tournament Not Held											LQ	LQ	LQ	SF	LQ	LQ	LQ	LQ	LQ	LQ	WD	A	LQ	LQ
Welsh Open	NH	1R	LQ	LQ	LQ	1R	1R	1R	LQ	1R	LQ	1R	QF	LQ	2R	LQ	1R	1R	LQ	LQ	1R	LQ	LQ	1R	2R	2R	1R	1R	1R	1R	1R	A	2R	LQ
Players Championship (Note: The event run under different name as Players Tour Championship Grand Finals (2010/2011–2012/2013))	Tournament Not Held																				DNQ	DNQ	2R	DNQ	1R	DNQ	DNQ	DNQ	DNQ	DNQ	DNQ	DNQ	DNQ	DNQ
World Open (Note: The event run under different names as Grand Prix (1990/1991–2000/2001 and 2004/2005–2009/2010) and LG Cup (2001/2002–2003/2004))	1R	LQ	1R	LQ	3R	1R	1R	1R	2R	LQ	LQ	LQ	LQ	LQ	1R	1R	LQ	LQ	LQ	LQ	LQ	LQ	LQ	1R	Not Held		1R	LQ	1R	LQ	Not Held			LQ
Tour Championship	Tournament Not Held																												DNQ	DNQ	DNQ	DNQ	DNQ	DNQ
World Championship	LQ	LQ	LQ	LQ	1R	2R	LQ	LQ	LQ	LQ	LQ	LQ	LQ	LQ	LQ	LQ	LQ	LQ	LQ	LQ	LQ	LQ	LQ	LQ	LQ	LQ	LQ	LQ	LQ	LQ	LQ	A	A	LQ
Non-ranking tournaments
The Masters	LQ	LQ	LQ	LQ	LQ	LQ	LQ	LQ	LQ	LQ	LQ	LQ	LQ	LQ	A	LQ	A	LQ	LQ	A	A	A	A	A	A	A	A	A	A	A	A	A	A	A
World Seniors Championship	NH	A	Tournament Not Held																		A	A	A	A	LQ	LQ	A	A	A	A	A	A	A	A
Former ranking tournaments
Classic	QF	2R	Tournament Not Held																															
Strachan Open (Note: The event run under different name as Strachan Challenge (1992/1993–1993/1994))	NH	LQ	MR	NR	Tournament Not Held																													
Dubai Classic (Note: The event run under different names as Thailand Classic (1995/1996) and Asian Classic (1996/1997))	2R	2R	3R	LQ	LQ	LQ	2R	Tournament Not Held																										
Malta Grand Prix	Tournament Not Held				Non-ranking Event					1R	NR	Tournament Not Held																						
Thailand Masters (Note: The event run under different names as Asian Open (1990/1991–1992/1993) and Thailand Open (1993/1994–1996/97))	LQ	LQ	LQ	LQ	LQ	LQ	LQ	LQ	LQ	LQ	LQ	LQ	NR	Not Held			NR	Tournament Not Held																
Irish Masters	Non-Ranking Event												1R	LQ	LQ	NH	NR	Tournament Not Held																
Northern Ireland Trophy	Tournament Not Held															NR	1R	1R	LQ	Tournament Not Held														
Bahrain Championship	Tournament Not Held																		1R	Tournament Not Held														
Wuxi Classic (Note: The event run under different name as Jiangsu Classic (2008/2009–2009/2010))	Tournament Not Held																		Non-Ranking Event				2R	LQ	1R	Tournament Not Held								
Australian Goldfields Open (Note: The event run under different names as Australian Open (1994/1995) and Australian Masters (1995/1996))	Tournament Not Held				Non-Ranking		Tournament Not Held															LQ	LQ	LQ	LQ	LQ	Tournament Not Held							
Shanghai Masters	Tournament Not Held																	LQ	LQ	LQ	LQ	LQ	LQ	LQ	LQ	LQ	LQ	LQ	Non-Ranking		Not Held			NR
Paul Hunter Classic (Note: The event was called the Grand Prix Fürth (2004/2005) and the Fürth German Open (2005/2006–2006/2007))	Tournament Not Held														Pro-am Event						Minor-Ranking Event						3R	2R	3R	NR	Tournament Not Held			
Indian Open	Tournament Not Held																							2R	2R	NH	LQ	1R	LQ	Tournament Not Held				
China Open (Note: The event run under different name as China International (1997/1998–1998/1999))	Tournament Not Held							NR	LQ	LQ	LQ	LQ	Not Held		LQ	LQ	LQ	LQ	WR	1R	LQ	LQ	LQ	LQ	LQ	3R	LQ	LQ	3R	Tournament Not Held				
Riga Masters (Note: The event was called the Riga Open (2014/2015–2015/2016))	Tournament Not Held																								MR		LQ	WD	1R	1R	Tournament Not Held			
China Championship	Tournament Not Held																										NR	LQ	LQ	LQ	Tournament Not Held			
WST Pro Series	Tournament Not Held																														RR	Not Held		
Gibraltar Open	Tournament Not Held																									MR	A	1R	2R	2R	2R	1R	Not Held	
Former non-ranking tournaments
Finnish Masters	Tournament Not Held					W	Tournament Not Held																											
China Masters	Tournament Not Held					W	Tournament Not Held																											
Masters Qualifying Event (Note: The event was also called the Benson & Hedges Championship (1990/1991–2002/2003))	2R	5R	MR	4R	F	QF	2R	SF	3R	1R	3R	1R	1R	SF	NH	1R	A	2R	LQ	A	Tournament Not Held													
World Grand Prix	Tournament Not Held																								1R	Ranking Event								
Shoot Out	2R	Tournament Not Held																			2R	1R	1R	1R	3R	QF	Ranking Event							
Six-red World Championship (Note: The event was called the Six-red Snooker International (2008/2009) and the Six-red World Grand Prix (2009/2010))	Tournament Not Held																		A	A	A	NH	A	A	A	A	RR	A	A	A	Not Held		LQ	NH

Performance Table Legend
LQ	lost in the qualifying draw	#R	lost in the early rounds of the tournament (WR = Wildcard round, RR = Round robin)	QF	lost in the quarter-finals
SF	lost in the semi–finals	F	lost in the final	W	won the tournament
DNQ	did not qualify for the tournament	A	did not participate in the tournament	WD	withdrew from the tournament
DQ	disqualified from the tournament				

NH / Not Held	event was not held.
NR / Non-Ranking Event	event is/was no longer a ranking event.
R / Ranking Event	event is/was a ranking event.
MR / Minor-Ranking Event	event is/was a minor-ranking event.

== Career finals ==
=== Ranking finals: 1 ===
Outcome	No.	Year	Championship	Opponent in the final	Score
Runner-up	1.	1996	International Open	(Scotland) John Higgins	3–9

=== Minor-ranking finals: 1 (1 title) ===
Outcome	No.	Year	Championship	Opponent in the final	Score
Winner	1.	2012	Players Tour Championship – Event 3	(Hong Kong) Marco Fu	4–2

=== Non-ranking finals: 5 (3 titles) ===
Outcome	No.	Year	Championship	Opponent in the final	Score
Runner-up	1.	1994	Benson & Hedges Championship	(Wales) Mark Williams	5–9
Winner	1.	1995	Merseyside Professional Championship	(England) Dean Reynolds	5–4
Winner	2.	1996	Finnish Masters	(England) Stefan Mazrocis	6–2
Winner	3.	1996	China Masters	(Pakistan) Shokat Ali	6–3
Runner-up	2.	2000	Merseyside Professional Championship	(England) Michael Holt	3–5

=== Amateur finals: 2 (2 titles) ===
Outcome	No.	Year	Championship	Opponent in the final	Score
Winner	1.	1987	Pontins Junior Championship	(England) Ronnie O'Sullivan	3–0
Winner	2.	1990	British Under-19 Championship	(England) Lee Richardson	3–0
