= Stefan Mazrocis =

Dutch-English snooker player (born 1967)

Personal information
- Born: April 18, 1967 (age 59) Blaby, Leicester, England

Sport
- Country: Netherlands (2003–present); England (until 2003)
- Sport: Snooker
- Professional: 1991–2001, 2002/2003, 2004/2005, 2008/2009
- Highest ranking: 65 (1997–1999)
- Best ranking finish: Quarter-final (x1)

Stefan Mazrocis (born 18 April 1967) is a Dutch-English former professional snooker player. He was born of Latvian and English parentage, and spent his early life in Leicester, England.

== Career ==
Mazrocis turned professional in 1991. In 1995, he qualified for the main stages of the World Championship at the Crucible Theatre, defeating Lee Walters, Martin Dziewialtowski, Jason Prince, Scott MacFarlane and Mark Bennett; drawn against incumbent champion Stephen Hendry in the last 32, he lost 3–10. He was a quarter-finalist at the 1996 Asian Classic.

In 1997, he qualified for the main stages of the World Championship, defeating Scott Rigg, Jason Wallace, Karl Payne, Jason Weston and Chris Small in qualifying, and was drawn to play Peter Ebdon in the first round. On this occasion, Mazrocis won 10–3, to reach the last-16 stage for the first time. His next opponent was Alain Robidoux; Mazrocis lost 9–13.

With this performance, Mazrocis rose to 65th in the world rankings, but he slipped back in the ensuing four years and lost his professional status in 2001 when ranked 122nd.

Having regained his professional status for 2008/2009 by winning the EBSA International Open in 2008, he defeated Chris McBreen and David Roe before losing to Barry Pinches in the third qualifying round of the 2008 Bahrain Championship.

Mazrocis' attempt to qualify for the World Championship in 2009 resulted in a 9–10 defeat to Tony Knowles in his first match.

== Performance and rankings timeline ==
Tournament	1990/ 91	1991/ 92	1992/ 93	1993/ 94		1994/ 95	1995/ 96	1996/ 97	1997/ 98	1998/ 99	1999/ 00	2000/ 01	2001/ 02	2002/ 03	2003/ 04	2004/ 05	2005/ 06	2008/ 09	2012/ 13	2013/ 14
Ranking (Note: From the 2010/2011 season it shows the ranking at the beginning of the season.)	(Note: He was an amateur)	(Note: New players on the Main Tour do not have a ranking)	144	112		73	72	81	65	65	92	105								
Ranking tournaments
Shanghai Masters	Tournament Not Held																	LQ	A	A
UK Championship	A	1R	LQ	LQ		LQ	LQ	LQ	LQ	LQ	LQ	LQ	A	LQ	A	LQ	A	LQ	A	A
German Masters (Note: The event was called the German Open (1995/1996-1997/1998))	Tournament Not Held						LQ	LQ	LQ	NR	Tournament Not Held								A	A
Welsh Open	A	LQ	1R	LQ		LQ	LQ	LQ	2R	LQ	LQ	LQ	A	LQ	A	LQ	A	LQ	A	A
World Open (Note: The event was called the Grand Prix (1990/1991–2000/2001, 2004/2005–2005/2006, 2008/2009) and the LG Cup (2001/2002–2003/2004))	A	LQ	LQ	LQ		LQ	LQ	LQ	LQ	LQ	LQ	LQ	A	LQ	A	LQ	A	LQ	A	A
Players Tour Championship Final	Tournament Not Held																		DNQ	DNQ
China Open (Note: The event was called the China International (1997/1998-1998/1999))	Tournament Not Held								NR	LQ	LQ	LQ	A	Not Held		LQ	A	LQ	A	A
World Championship	A	LQ	LQ	LQ		1R	LQ	2R	LQ	LQ	LQ	LQ	LQ	LQ	LQ	LQ	LQ	LQ	A	A
Non-ranking tournaments
World Seniors Championship	NH	A	Tournament Not Held																LQ	LQ
The Masters	A	LQ	LQ	LQ		WD	LQ	LQ	LQ	LQ	LQ	A	LQ	A	A	A	A	LQ	A	A
Former ranking tournaments
Classic	A	LQ	Tournament Not Held																	
Strachan Open	NH	LQ	MR	NR		Tournament Not Held														
Asian Classic (Note: The event was called the Dubai Classic (1990/1991-1994/1995) and the Thailand Classic (1995/1996))	A	LQ	LQ	LQ		LQ	LQ	QF	Tournament Not Held											
Malta Grand Prix	Tournament Not Held					Non-Ranking Event					LQ	NR	Tournament Not Held							
Thailand Masters (Note: The event was called the Asian Open (1990/1991-1992/1993) and the Thailand Open (1993/1994-1996/1997))	A	LQ	LQ	LQ		LQ	LQ	LQ	LQ	LQ	LQ	LQ	A	NR	Tournament Not Held					
Scottish Open (Note: The event was called the International Open (1992/1993-1996/1997) and the Players Championship (2003/2004))	Not Held		1R	LQ		LQ	1R	LQ	LQ	1R	LQ	LQ	A	LQ	A	Not Held			MR	NH
British Open	A	LQ	LQ	LQ		LQ	1R	LQ	1R	LQ	1R	LQ	A	LQ	A	LQ	Tournament Not Held			
Irish Masters	Non-Ranking Event													LQ	A	LQ	Tournament Not Held			
Malta Cup (Note: The event was called the European Open (1990/1991-1996/1997 and 2001/2002-2003/2004), the Irish Open (1998/1999) and the Malta Cup (2004/2005-2005/2006))	A	LQ	LQ	LQ		LQ	LQ	LQ	NH	LQ	Not Held		A	LQ	A	LQ	A	Not Held		
Northern Ireland Trophy	Tournament Not Held																NR	LQ	Not Held	
Bahrain Championship	Tournament Not Held																	LQ	Not Held	
Former non-ranking tournaments
World Masters	2R	Tournament Not Held																		
Strachan Open	NH	R	MR	QF	LQ	Tournament Not Held														
Finnish Masters	Tournament Not Held						F	Tournament Not Held												

Performance table legend
LQ	lost in the qualifying draw	#R	lost in the early rounds of the tournament (WR = Wildcard round, RR = Round robin)	QF	lost in the quarter-finals
SF	lost in the semi–finals	F	lost in the final	W	won the tournament
DNQ	did not qualify for the tournament	A	did not participate in the tournament	WD	withdrew from the tournament

NH / Not Held	means an event was not held.
NR / Non-Ranking Event	means an event is/was no longer a ranking event.
R / Ranking Event	means an event is/was a ranking event.
MR / Minor-Ranking Event	means an event is/was a minor-ranking event.

== Career finals ==
=== Minor-ranking finals: 1 ===
Outcome	No.	Year	Championship	Opponent in the final	Score
Runner-up	1.	1992	Strachan Challenge - Event 1	(Northern Ireland) Joe Swail	4–9

=== Non-ranking finals: 4 (3 titles) ===
Outcome	No.	Year	Championship	Opponent in the final	Score
Runner-up	1.	1996	Finnish Masters	(England) Rod Lawler	2–6
Winner	1.	2001	Euro Tour – Event 2	(Netherlands) Mario Wehrmann	3–2
Winner	2.	2002	Euro Tour – Finals	(Netherlands) Mario Wehrmann	5–0
Winner	3.	2003	Challenge Tour - Event 1	(England) Paul Davison	6–2

=== Pro-am finals: 3 (3 titles) ===
Outcome	No.	Year	Championship	Opponent in the final	Score
Winner	1.	1987	Pontins Spring Open	(England) Barry Pinches	7–2
Winner	2.	1995	Austrian Open	(Germany) Mike Henson	5–3
Winner	3.	2001	Austrian Open (2)	(England) Lee Richardson	5–3

=== Amateur finals: 8 (6 titles) ===
Outcome	No.	Year	Championship	Opponent in the final	Score
Runner-up	1.	1987	World Under-21 Championship	(England) Jonathan Birch	1–4
Winner	1.	1988	EBSA European Snooker Championship	(Malta) Paul Mifsud	11–7
Runner-up	2.	1994	German Open Snooker Ranking - Event 6 - 4 Star - Hannover Open	(Belgium) Danny Lathouwers	2–4
Winner	2.	2004	Dutch Amateur Championship	(Netherlands) Rolf De Jong	5–0
Winner	3.	2005	Dutch Amateur Championship (2)	(Netherlands) Gerrit bij de Leij	5–2
Winner	4.	2007	Dutch Amateur Championship (3)	(Netherlands) Gerrit bij de Leij	5–4
Winner	5.	2008	EBSA International Play-Off	(Netherlands) Lennon Starkey	4–2
Winner	6.	2009	Dutch Amateur Championship (4)	(Netherlands) Gerrit bij de Leij	5–3
