= Strachan Open =

Tournament information
- Venue: Willie Thorne Snooker Centre
- Location: Leicester
- Country: England
- Established: 1992; 33 years ago
- Organisation(s): World Professional Billiards and Snooker Association
- Format: Non-ranking event
- Final year: 1994; 31 years ago
- Final champion: (England) Anthony Hamilton

The Strachan Open was a professional snooker tournament held between 1992 and 1994. It had varying ranking status during its history.

== History ==
The tournament was first held in 1992, and was a ranking tournament. It was sponsored by billiard cloth company Strachan. The event was boycotted by several top players due to lower points tariff and prize money. The final stages were played at the Thornbury Leisure Centre in Thornbury. Peter Ebdon made his first official maximum break in the qualifying rounds against Wayne Martin.

The following season to encourage the new professional, the World Professional Billiards and Snooker Association created four so-called minor ranking events. These tournaments were open to every professional, but earned only one-tenth of the ranking points of most other ranking tournaments. Three of the four minor ranking events were Strachan Challenges. The fourth was the Benson & Hedges Championship. Most of the top sixteen players did not bother to enter. The Strachan Challenges continued for one more season with two events, but they did not carry ranking points.

== Winners ==
Year	Winner	Runner-up	Final score	Season
Strachan Open (ranking)
1992	(Thailand) James Wattana	(England) John Parrott	9–5	1991/92
Strachan Challenge (minor-ranking)
1992 – Event 1	(Northern Ireland) Joe Swail	(England) Stefan Mazrocis	9–4	1992/93
1993 – Event 2	(England) Troy Shaw	(England) Nigel Bond	9–4	1992/93
1993 – Event 3	(Malta) Tony Drago	(Republic of Ireland) Ken Doherty	9–7	1992/93
Strachan Challenge (non-ranking)
1994 – Event 1	(England) Anthony Hamilton	(England) Andy Hicks	9–4	1993/94
1994 – Event 2	(England) Anthony Hamilton	(Wales) Paul Davies	9–4	1993/94
