= Players Tour Championship 2012/2013 – Event 3 =

Players Tour Championship 2012/2013 Event 3
Tournament information
- Dates: 5–9 September 2012
- Venue: South West Snooker Academy
- City: Gloucester
- Country: England
- Organisation: World Snooker
- Format: Minor-ranking event
- Total prize fund: £50,000
- Winner's share: £10,000
- Highest break: Alfie Burden (ENG) (139)

Final
- Champion: Rod Lawler (ENG)
- Runner-up: Marco Fu (HKG)
- Score: 4–2

The Players Tour Championship 2012/2013 – Event 3 was a professional minor-ranking snooker tournament that took place between 5–9 September 2012 at the South West Snooker Academy in Gloucester, England.

Rod Lawler won the first professional title of his 22-year career by defeating Marco Fu 4–2 in the final.

== Prize fund and ranking points ==
The breakdown of prize money and ranking points of the event is shown below:

	Prize fund	Ranking points^{1}
Winner	£10,000	2,000
Runner-up	£5,000	1,600
Semi-finalist	£2,500	1,280
Quarter-finalist	£1,500	1,000
Last 16	£1,000	760
Last 32	£600	560
Last 64	£200	360
Total	£50,000	–

- ^{1} Only professional players can earn ranking points.

== Main draw ==
=== Preliminary rounds ===
==== Round 1 ====
Best of 7 frames

(England) Darren Bond	4–1	(England) Rees Carter
(Scotland) Fraser Patrick	4–1	(Wales) Kishan Hirani
(England) Ben Harrison	4–1	(Belgium) Hans Blanckaert
(England) Jordan Winbourne	w/o–w/d	(Australia) Marc Robertson
(England) Brandon Sargeant	1–4	(Scotland) Eden Sharav
(Scotland) Marc Davis	2–4	(England) Oliver Lines
(England) Christopher Keogan	4–1	(England) Wayne Townsend
(England) Sydney Wilson	3–4	(England) Darrell Whitworth
(England) Kyren Wilson	4–0	(India) David Singh
(England) Joe O'Connor	4–2	(England) Franky McGovern
(England) George Marter	0–4	(England) Shane Castle
(England) Liam Monk	4–2	(England) Gary Steele
(Brazil) Itaro Santos	4–1	(England) Williams Lemons

(Republic of Ireland) Dessie Sheehan	4–3	(England) Robert Thickner
(England) Ricky Norris	4–0	(England) Greg Davis
(England) Gareth Green	4–0	(England) Craig Barber
(England) Scott Bell	4–1	(England) Anthony Harris
(England) Edward Topharn	1–4	(England) Andrew Marriott
(England) Oliver Brown	4–0	(England) Lewis Frampton
(England) Joe Steele	0–4	(England) Stuart Carrington
(England) Jake Nicholson	1–4	(England) Ian Glover
(England) Henry Roper	3–4	(England) Jamie Gibson
(Wales) Jack Bradford	0–4	(Scotland) Rhys Clark
(Wales) Gareth Allen	4–0	(England) Elliot Slessor
(England) Marc Harman	4–3	(England) Adam Edge
(England) Hassan Miah	3–4	(England) Callum Downing

==== Round 2 ====
Best of 7 frames

(Wales) Alex Taubman	4–3	(England) Darren Bond
(Wales) Jamie Clarke	2–4	(Scotland) Fraser Patrick
(England) Ryan Mears	0–4	(England) Ben Harrison
(England) Ben Fortey	4–2	(England) Jordan Winbourne
(England) Daniel Ward	2–4	(Scotland) Eden Sharav
(England) Zak Surety	4–2	(England) Steve Ventham
(England) Phil O'Kane	2–4	(England) Oliver Lines
(Wales) Gavin Lewis	0–4	(England) Mitchell Mann
(England) Andrew Milliard	4–0	(England) Christopher Keogan
(England) Gareth Potts	w/d–w/o	(England) Darrell Whitworth
(England) Adam Bobat	1–4	(England) Kyren Wilson
(England) Reanne Evans	4–0	(England) Joe O'Connor
(England) Harvey Chandler	4–2	(England) Shane Castle
(England) Ryan Causton	4–2	(England) Liam Monk
(England) Adam Wicheard	4–1	(Brazil) Itaro Santos

(England) Nico Elton	4–0	(Republic of Ireland) Dessie Sheehan
(England) Sachin Plaha	0–4	(England) Matthew Day
(England) Chris Wakelin	3–4	(England) Ricky Norris
(England) Tom Maxfield	2–4	(England) Gareth Green
(England) Sam Harvey	4–1	(England) Scott Bell
(England) Louis Heathcote	4–2	(England) Andrew Marriott
(England) Sam Thistlewhite	4–2	(England) Oliver Brown
(England) Nick Jennings	0–4	(England) Stuart Carrington
(England) Chris Norbury	3–4	(England) Ian Glover
(Egypt) Hassan Abdalla	w/d–w/o	(England) Jamie Gibson
(England) Sanderson Lam	4–0	(Scotland) Sean James Riach
(Scotland) Ross Muir	1–4	(Scotland) Rhys Clark
(England) Richard Remelie	4–2	(Wales) Gareth Allen
(Wales) Ben Jones	4–0	(England) Marc Harman
(England) James Cahill	2–4	(England) Callum Downing

=== Main rounds ===
==== Top half ====
===== Section 1 =====
Last 128; Best of 7 frames
(Scotland) Stephen Maguire	2
(Hong Kong) Marco Fu	4
(England) Robbie Williams	4
(England) Barry Pinches	0
(Wales) Matthew Stevens	4
(Wales) Alex Taubman	0
(Wales) Mark Williams	4
(Scotland) Fraser Patrick	1
(Belgium) Luca Brecel	4
(England) Ben Harrison	3
(China) Xiao Guodong	4
(England) Ben Fortey	1
(Wales) Ryan Day	4
(England) Joel Walker	2
(England) Ricky Walden	4
(Australia) Ben Judge	0

Last 64; Best of 7 frames
(Hong Kong) Marco Fu	4
(England) Robbie Williams	2
(Wales) Matthew Stevens	0
(Wales) Mark Williams	4
(Belgium) Luca Brecel	1
(China) Xiao Guodong	4
(Wales) Ryan Day	1
(England) Ricky Walden	4

Last 32; Best of 7 frames
(Hong Kong) Marco Fu	4
(Wales) Mark Williams	0
(China) Xiao Guodong	1
(England) Ricky Walden	4

Last 16; Best of 7 frames
(Hong Kong) Marco Fu	4
(England) Ricky Walden	0

===== Section 2 =====
Last 128; Best of 7 frames
(China) Liang Wenbo	4
(Scotland) Eden Sharav	1
(Wales) Michael White	4
(England) Sam Baird	2
(England) Jimmy White	1
(India) Aditya Mehta	4
(England) Ali Carter	4
(England) Sean O'Sullivan	0
(England) Jack Lisowski	2
(England) Zak Surety	4
(England) Joe Perry	3
(England) Oliver Lines	4
(England) Andrew Higginson	3
(China) Chen Zhe	4
(England) Ian Burns	4
(Scotland) Graeme Dott	3

Last 64; Best of 7 frames
(China) Liang Wenbo	4
(Wales) Michael White	3
(India) Aditya Mehta	1
(England) Ali Carter	4
(England) Zak Surety	4
(England) Oliver Lines	2
(China) Chen Zhe	4
(England) Ian Burns	2

Last 32; Best of 7 frames
(China) Liang Wenbo	1
(England) Ali Carter	4
(England) Zak Surety	1
(China) Chen Zhe	4

Last 16; Best of 7 frames
(England) Ali Carter	4
(China) Chen Zhe	2

===== Section 3 =====
Last 128; Best of 7 frames
(England) Barry Hawkins	4
(Malta) Tony Drago	3
(England) Shaun Murphy	4
(England) Mitchell Mann	1
(England) Mark Joyce	4
(England) Michael Wasley	1
(England) Mark King	4
(England) Andrew Milliard	0
(England) John Astley	4
(England) Darrell Whitworth	0
(England) Jamie Cope	4
(England) Mike Dunn	1
(Scotland) Jamie Burnett	4
(England) Kyren Wilson	3
(England) Andrew Norman	1
(England) Reanne Evans	4

Last 64; Best of 7 frames
(England) Barry Hawkins	3
(England) Shaun Murphy	4
(England) Mark Joyce	3
(England) Mark King	4
(England) John Astley	0
(England) Jamie Cope	4
(Scotland) Jamie Burnett	4
(England) Reanne Evans	0

Last 32; Best of 7 frames
(England) Shaun Murphy	4
(England) Mark King	3
(England) Jamie Cope	4
(Scotland) Jamie Burnett	1

Last 16; Best of 7 frames
(England) Shaun Murphy	4
(England) Jamie Cope	3

===== Section 4 =====
Last 128; Best of 7 frames
(England) Robert Milkins	4
(England) Harvey Chandler	0
(England) Dave Harold	4
(England) Ryan Causton	1
(England) Mark Davis	4
(England) Adam Wicheard	1
(Wales) Jamie Jones	4
(England) Nico Elton	0
(England) Anthony Hamilton	0
(China) Zhang Anda	4
(England) Judd Trump	4
(Scotland) Anthony McGill	1
(Northern Ireland) Joe Swail	4
(Thailand) Passakorn Suwannawat	1
(Thailand) Dechawat Poomjaeng	4
(England) Matthew Day	1

Last 64; Best of 7 frames
(England) Robert Milkins	4
(England) Dave Harold	0
(England) Mark Davis	4
(Wales) Jamie Jones	3
(China) Zhang Anda	0
(England) Judd Trump	4
(Northern Ireland) Joe Swail	4
(Thailand) Dechawat Poomjaeng	1

Last 32; Best of 7 frames
(England) Robert Milkins	4
(England) Mark Davis	2
(England) Judd Trump	4
(Northern Ireland) Joe Swail	2

Last 16; Best of 7 frames
(England) Robert Milkins	4
(England) Judd Trump	1

==== Bottom half ====
===== Section 5 =====
Last 128; Best of 7 frames
(England) Martin Gould	4
(England) Ricky Norris	2
(England) Craig Steadman	4
(England) Gareth Green	2
(Scotland) Marcus Campbell	4
(England) Sam Harvey	1
(England) Rory McLeod	4
(England) Louis Heathcote	2
(England) Peter Lines	4
(Thailand) Thanawat Thirapongpaiboon	2
(England) Michael Wild	0
(England) Stephen Lee	4
(Scotland) John Higgins	4
(England) Sam Thistlewhite	1
(England) Alfie Burden	4
(England) Martin O'Donnell	3

Last 64; Best of 7 frames
(England) Martin Gould	4
(England) Craig Steadman	3
(Scotland) Marcus Campbell	2
(England) Rory McLeod	4
(England) Peter Lines	2
(England) Stephen Lee	4
(Scotland) John Higgins	1
(England) Alfie Burden	4

Last 32; Best of 7 frames
(England) Martin Gould	4
(England) Rory McLeod	3
(England) Stephen Lee	4
(England) Alfie Burden	0

Last 16; Best of 7 frames
(England) Martin Gould	3
(England) Stephen Lee	4

===== Section 6 =====
Last 128; Best of 7 frames
(England) Simon Bedford	4
(England) Ronnie O'Sullivan	3
(China) Li Yan	0
(England) Adam Duffy	4
(Wales) Jak Jones	2
(England) Stuart Carrington	4
(England) Rod Lawler	4
(England) Ian Glover	1
(China) Cao Yupeng	3
(England) Peter Ebdon	4
(Scotland) Alan McManus	4
(England) Matthew Selt	3
(Australia) Neil Robertson	4
(Scotland) Michael Leslie	2
(England) Stuart Bingham	4
(England) David Gilbert	0

Last 64; Best of 7 frames
(England) Simon Bedford	4
(England) Adam Duffy	3
(England) Stuart Carrington	1
(England) Rod Lawler	4
(England) Peter Ebdon	3
(Scotland) Alan McManus	4
(Australia) Neil Robertson	0
(England) Stuart Bingham	4

Last 32; Best of 7 frames
(England) Simon Bedford	2
(England) Rod Lawler	4
(Scotland) Alan McManus	3
(England) Stuart Bingham	4

Last 16; Best of 7 frames
(England) Rod Lawler	4
(England) Stuart Bingham	3

===== Section 7 =====
Last 128; Best of 7 frames
(Northern Ireland) Mark Allen	4
(England) Jamie Gibson	0
(Republic of Ireland) Ken Doherty	4
(England) Sanderson Lam	0
(China) Yu Delu	4
(England) Jimmy Robertson	2
(Scotland) Scott Donaldson	0
(China) Ding Junhui	4
(England) Gary Wilson	4
(Scotland) Rhys Clark	0
(Wales) Andrew Pagett	0
(Republic of Ireland) Fergal O'Brien	4
(England) Paul Davison	4
(England) Tom Ford	3
(England) Michael Holt	4
(Northern Ireland) Gerard Greene	2

Last 64; Best of 7 frames
(Northern Ireland) Mark Allen	3
(Republic of Ireland) Ken Doherty	4
(China) Yu Delu	3
(China) Ding Junhui	4
(England) Gary Wilson	0
(Republic of Ireland) Fergal O'Brien	4
(England) Paul Davison	0
(England) Michael Holt	4

Last 32; Best of 7 frames
(Republic of Ireland) Ken Doherty	4
(China) Ding Junhui	2
(Republic of Ireland) Fergal O'Brien	4
(England) Michael Holt	2

Last 16; Best of 7 frames
(Republic of Ireland) Ken Doherty	3
(Republic of Ireland) Fergal O'Brien	4

===== Section 8 =====
Last 128; Best of 7 frames
(England) David Grace	4
(England) Richard Remelie	2
(England) Ben Woollaston	4
(Wales) Ben Jones	0
(China) Liu Chuang	4
(England) Callum Downing	2
(Thailand) Thepchaiya Un-Nooh	0
(England) Steve Davis	4
(Wales) Dominic Dale	4
(Wales) Daniel Wells	3
(England) Allan Taylor	3
(England) Jamie O'Neill	4
(Thailand) James Wattana	4
(England) Andy Hicks	2
(England) Mark Selby	4
(England) Liam Highfield	2

Last 64; Best of 7 frames
(England) David Grace	3
(England) Ben Woollaston	4
(China) Liu Chuang	3
(England) Steve Davis	4
(Wales) Dominic Dale	4
(England) Jamie O'Neill	1
(Thailand) James Wattana	2
(England) Mark Selby	4

Last 32; Best of 7 frames
(England) Ben Woollaston	4
(England) Steve Davis	1
(Wales) Dominic Dale	4
(England) Mark Selby	2

Last 16; Best of 7 frames
(England) Ben Woollaston	2
(Wales) Dominic Dale	4

==== Finals ====
Quarter-finals; Best of 7 frames		Semi-finals; Best of 7 frames		Final; Best of 7 frames
(Hong Kong) Marco Fu	4
(England) Ali Carter	2	(Hong Kong) Marco Fu	4
(England) Shaun Murphy	4	(England) Shaun Murphy	0
(England) Robert Milkins	1			(Hong Kong) Marco Fu	2
(England) Stephen Lee	3			(England) Rod Lawler	4
(England) Rod Lawler	4	(England) Rod Lawler	4
(Republic of Ireland) Fergal O'Brien	0	(Wales) Dominic Dale	0
(Wales) Dominic Dale	4

== Century breaks ==
- 139 – Alfie Burden
- 138, 129, 102 – Michael White
- 136 – Stephen Lee
- 134 – Alan McManus
- 130, 114, 114 – Rod Lawler
- 130 – Barry Hawkins
- 128 – Ryan Day
- 124, 113 – Michael Holt
- 124, 106, 105 – Robert Milkins
- 123 – Stuart Bingham
- 119, 116 – Joe Swail
- 117, 116, 116, 114, 105, 102 – Marco Fu
- 117 – Mark Selby
- 115 – Chen Zhe
- 113, 108, 103 – Dominic Dale
- 112 – Kyren Wilson
- 112 – Mark Allen
- 108, 107, 105, 100 – Fergal O'Brien
- 108 – Passakorn Suwannawat
- 107, 100 – Mark Joyce
- 107, 100 – Jamie Cope
- 106 – Liam Highfield
- 106 – James Wattana
- 105 – Luca Brecel
- 105 – Jamie Jones
- 103 – Matthew Stevens
- 102 – Joe Perry
- 101 – Mark Davis
- 101 – Simon Bedford
- 100, 100 – Ding Junhui
- 100 – Judd Trump
- 100 – Martin Gould
