= 1992/1993 Strachan Challenge – Event 2 =

Strachan Challenge – Event 2
Tournament information
- Dates: 3–12 January 1993
- Venue: Radion Plaxa Club
- City: Sheffield
- Country: England
- Organisation: WPBSA
- Format: Minor-ranking event
- Winner's share: £3,000

Final
- Champion: Troy Shaw (ENG)
- Runner-up: Nigel Bond (ENG)
- Score: 9–4

The Strachan Challenge Series – Event 2 was a professional minor-ranking snooker tournament, that was held from 3 to 12 January 1993 at the Radion Plaxa Club in Sheffield, England.

The event was the second of three held in an effort to encourage some of the hundreds of new professionals who had joined the tour. These minor ranking events were open to all the pros but carried a much lower ranking points tariff, around ten per cent of that applicable to most of the other tournaments.

Troy Shaw won the tournament by defeating Nigel Bond nine frames to four in the final.

== Main draw ==
Last 32; Best of 9 frames
(England) Troy Shaw	5
(England) Karl Payne	3
(Northern Ireland) Alex Higgins	5
(Malta) Tony Drago	2
(South Africa) Peter Francisco	5
(Thailand) Noppadon Noppachorn	3
(England) Andy Hicks	5
(England) Karl Broughton	1
(England) Brian Morgan	5
(England) Rod Lawler	3
(England) Bob Marshall	5
(Scotland) Chris Small	4
(England) Mick Price	5
(England) Jason Ferguson	2
(England) Nick Walker	5
(Canada) Alain Robidoux	4
(England) Nigel Bond	5
(Wales) Mark Williams	3
(Wales) Anthony Davies	5
(England) Andrew Hannah	1
(England) Peter Daubney	5
(Wales) Tony Chappel	4
(England) Dean Reynolds	5
(England) Pat Kenny	4
(Scotland) Euan Henderson	5
(England) Willie Thorne	1
(England) Tony Knowles	5
(England) Mark Flowerdew	4
(Northern Ireland) Joe Swail	5
(England) Peter Ebdon	1
(Thailand) Suriya Suwannasingh	5
(Wales) Paul Davies	4

Last 16; Best of 9 frames
(England) Troy Shaw	5
(Northern Ireland) Alex Higgins	4
(South Africa) Peter Francisco	5
(England) Andy Hicks	1
(England) Brian Morgan	5
(England) Bob Marshall	4
(England) Mick Price	5
(England) Nick Walker	2
(England) Nigel Bond	5
(Wales) Anthony Davies	1
(England) Peter Daubney	5
(England) Dean Reynolds	2
(Scotland) Euan Henderson	5
(England) Tony Knowles	1
(Northern Ireland) Joe Swail	5
(Thailand) Suriya Suwannasingh	0

Quarter-finals; Best of 9 frames
(England) Troy Shaw	5
(South Africa) Peter Francisco	1
(England) Brian Morgan	5
(England) Mick Price	0
(England) Nigel Bond	5
(England) Peter Daubney	4
(Scotland) Euan Henderson	5
(Northern Ireland) Joe Swail	4

Semi-finals; Best of 11 frames
(England) Troy Shaw	6
(England) Brian Morgan	5
(England) Nigel Bond	6
(Scotland) Euan Henderson	2

Final; Best of 17 frames
(England) Troy Shaw	9
(England) Nigel Bond	4
