= 1992/1993 Strachan Challenge – Event 1 =

Strachan Challenge – Event 1
Tournament information
- Dates: 12–21 December 1992
- Venue: Jimmy White Snooker Lodge
- City: Aldershot
- Country: England
- Organisation: WPBSA
- Format: Minor-ranking event
- Winner's share: £3,000

Final
- Champion: Joe Swail (NIR)
- Runner-up: Stefan Mazrocis (ENG)
- Score: 9–4

The Strachan Challenge Series – Event 1 was a professional minor-ranking snooker tournament, that was held from 12 to 21 December 1992 at the Jimmy White Snooker Lodge in Aldershot, England.

The event was held in an effort to encourage some of the hundreds of new professionals who had joined the tour, the WPBSA experimented with several so-called minor ranking events. These were open to all the pros but carried a much lower ranking points tariff, around ten per cent of that applicable to most of the other tournaments. The already established Benson and Hedges Championship was one of the four events and the others were three legs of the Strachan Challenge. Although there was no restriction as to who could enter, most of the top 16 did not bother. They were played out at snooker clubs, the first and the third at Aldershot and the second in Sheffield. The experiment was not repeated although there were two further Challenge events the following season which did not carry any ranking status.

Joe Swail won the tournament by defeating Stefan Mazrocis nine frames to four in the final.

Six members of the top-16 entered, the highest-ranked of them being Neal Foulds (5th). None of them reached as far as the quarter-finals.

== Prize fund ==
The breakdown of prize money for the event is shown below:

- Winner: £3,000
- Runner-up: £2,200
- Semi-finals: £1,400
- Quarter-finals: £850
- Last 16: £500
- Last 32: £200
- Last 64: £100
- Last 128: £50

== Main draw ==
Last 32; Best of 9 frames
(Northern Ireland) Joe Swail	5
(England) Robert Foxall	1
(England) David Roe	5
(England) Nick Terry	0
(England) Jonathan Birch	5
(Scotland) Scott MacFarlane	3
(England) John Giles	5
(England) Paul Tanner	4
(England) Ronnie O'Sullivan	5
(Scotland) Chris Small	2
(Republic of Ireland) Stephen Murphy	5
(England) Steve Judd	1
(Republic of Ireland) Ken Doherty	5
(Wales) Cliff Wilson	0
(England) Mark Davis	5
(Scotland) Scott Bigham	1
(England) Stefan Mazrocis	5
(Northern Ireland) Jason Prince	3
(Wales) Paul Davies	5
(England) Gary Wilkinson	1
(Wales) Mark Bennett	5
(England) Willie Thorne	2
(England) Joe Johnson	5
(Northern Ireland) Alex Higgins	4
(England) Anthony Hamilton	5
(Wales) Darren Morgan	3
(England) Stuart Reardon	5
(England) Rod Lawler	4
(South Africa) Peter Francisco	5
(England) Brian Rowswell	3
(England) Martin Clark	5
(England) Bob Marshall	3

Last 16; Best of 9 frames
(Northern Ireland) Joe Swail	5
(England) David Roe	2
(England) Jonathan Birch	5
(England) John Giles	3
(England) Ronnie O'Sullivan	5
(Republic of Ireland) Stephen Murphy	3
(Republic of Ireland) Ken Doherty	5
(England) Mark Davis	2
(England) Stefan Mazrocis	5
(Wales) Paul Davies	2
(Wales) Mark Bennett	5
(England) Joe Johnson	0
(England) Anthony Hamilton	5
(England) Stuart Reardon	3
(South Africa) Peter Francisco	5
(England) Martin Clark	4

Quarter-finals; Best of 9 frames
(Northern Ireland) Joe Swail	5
(England) Jonathan Birch	4
(England) Ronnie O'Sullivan	5
(Republic of Ireland) Ken Doherty	0
(England) Stefan Mazrocis	5
(Wales) Mark Bennett	4
(England) Anthony Hamilton	5
(South Africa) Peter Francisco	3

Semi-finals; Best of 11 frames
(Northern Ireland) Joe Swail	6
(England) Ronnie O'Sullivan	5
(England) Stefan Mazrocis	6
(England) Anthony Hamilton	4

Final; Best of 17 frames
(Northern Ireland) Joe Swail	9
(England) Stefan Mazrocis	4
