= 1993 British Open =

1993 Wickes British Open
Tournament information
- Dates: 22 February – 6 March 1993
- Venue: Assembly Rooms
- City: Derby
- Country: England
- Organisation: WPBSA
- Format: Ranking event
- Total prize fund: £250,000
- Winner's share: £50,000
- Highest break: Steve Davis (ENG) (139)

Final
- Champion: Steve Davis (ENG)
- Runner-up: James Wattana (THA)
- Score: 10–2

The 1993 British Open (officially the 1993 Wickes British Open) was a professional ranking snooker tournament, that was held from 22 February to 6 March 1993 at the Assembly Rooms in Derby, England. ITV televised the event from 27 February.

Steve Davis won the tournament by defeating James Wattana ten frames to two in the final. The defending champion Jimmy White was defeated in the semi-final by Davis.

== Prize fund ==
The breakdown of prize money for this year is shown below:

- Winner: £50,000
- Final: £25,000
- Semi-final: £12,500
- Quarter-final: £7,000
- Last 16: £3,500
- Last 32: £2,000
- Last 64: £1,000
- Last 96: £450
- Last 128: £200
- Last 192: £100
- Stage one highest break: £800
- Stage two highest break: £2,000
- Total: £250,000

== Main draw ==
Last 64; Best of 9 frames
(England) Jimmy White	5
(Canada) Brady Gollan	4
(England) Joe Johnson	5
(Republic of Ireland) Anthony O'Connor	2
(Wales) Darren Morgan	5
(Wales) Paul Davies	1
(Australia) Warren King	5
(England) Tony Jones	2
(Northern Ireland) Joe Swail	5
(Canada) Alain Robidoux	2
(England) Troy Shaw	5
(England) Danny Fowler	4
(Scotland) John Higgins	5
(Wales) Terry Griffiths	2
(England) Nick Terry	5
(England) Dean Reynolds	3
(England) Danny Smith	5
(England) Neal Foulds	3
(Republic of Ireland) Ken Doherty	5
(Hong Kong) Franky Chan	3
(England) Willie Thorne	5
(England) Jimmy Michie	3
(England) Anthony Hamilton	5
(Wales) Doug Mountjoy	1
(England) Stephen Lee	5
(England) Steve James	2
(New Zealand) Dene O'Kane	5
(Republic of Ireland) Eugene Hughes	4
(England) Steve Davis	5
(England) Les Dodd	0
(England) Dave Finbow	5
(South Africa) Peter Francisco	2
(England) John Parrott	5
(Northern Ireland) Alex Higgins	0
(England) Mike Hallett	5
(Scotland) Chris Small	2
(England) Martin Clark	5
(England) Brian Morgan	0
(Malta) Tony Drago	5
(Canada) Jim Wych	2
(England) Ian Graham	5
(Northern Ireland) Dennis Taylor	1
(South Africa) Silvino Francisco	5
(Wales) Ian Sargeant	1
(Thailand) James Wattana	5
(England) Mark Davis	4
(Wales) Steve Newbury	5
(England) Mark Johnston-Allen	1
(England) Peter Ebdon	5
(England) Gary Wilkinson	4
(England) Craig Edwards	5
(England) Tony Knowles	1
(England) Nigel Bond	5
(England) Tony Meo	2
(Wales) Mark Bennett	5
(England) Darren Hackeson	2
(Scotland) Alan McManus	5
(Northern Ireland) Jason Prince	2
(England) David Roe	5
(Wales) Mark Williams	1
(Scotland) Stephen Hendry	5
(England) Jason Ferguson	0
(Australia) Eddie Charlton	5
(Wales) Colin Roscoe	0

Last 32; Best of 9 frames
(England) Jimmy White	5
(England) Joe Johnson	3
(Wales) Darren Morgan	5
(Australia) Warren King	0
(Northern Ireland) Joe Swail	4
(England) Troy Shaw	5
(Scotland) John Higgins	5
(England) Nick Terry	3
(England) Danny Smith	1
(Republic of Ireland) Ken Doherty	5
(England) Willie Thorne	5
(England) Anthony Hamilton	1
(England) Stephen Lee	5
(New Zealand) Dene O'Kane	1
(England) Steve Davis	5
(England) Dave Finbow	2
(England) John Parrott	5
(England) Mike Hallett	4
(England) Martin Clark	2
(Malta) Tony Drago	5
(England) Ian Graham	5
(South Africa) Silvino Francisco	1
(Thailand) James Wattana	5
(Wales) Steve Newbury	2
(England) Peter Ebdon	5
(England) Craig Edwards	0
(England) Nigel Bond	2
(Wales) Mark Bennett	5
(Scotland) Alan McManus	3
(England) David Roe	5
(Scotland) Stephen Hendry	5
(Australia) Eddie Charlton	0

Last 16; Best of 9 frames
(England) Jimmy White	5
(Wales) Darren Morgan	3
(England) Troy Shaw	2
(Scotland) John Higgins	5
(Republic of Ireland) Ken Doherty	5
(England) Willie Thorne	3
(England) Stephen Lee	2
(England) Steve Davis	5
(England) John Parrott	2
(Malta) Tony Drago	5
(England) Ian Graham	1
(Thailand) James Wattana	5
(England) Peter Ebdon	2
(Wales) Mark Bennett	5
(England) David Roe	2
(Scotland) Stephen Hendry	5

Quarter-finals; Best of 9 frames
(England) Jimmy White	5
(Scotland) John Higgins	3
(Republic of Ireland) Ken Doherty	4
(England) Steve Davis	5
(Malta) Tony Drago	2
(Thailand) James Wattana	5
(Wales) Mark Bennett	0
(Scotland) Stephen Hendry	5

Semi-finals; Best of 11 frames
(England) Jimmy White	3
(England) Steve Davis	6
(Thailand) James Wattana	6
(Scotland) Stephen Hendry	4

Final; Best of 19 frames
(England) Steve Davis	10
(Thailand) James Wattana	2

== Final ==
Final: Best of 19 frames. Referee: Assembly Rooms, Derby, England. 6 March 1993.
Steve Davis; England	10–2	James Wattana; Thailand
Afternoon: 62–20 (61), 116–10 (90), 59–30, 93–21 (54), 52–65, 67–46 (54), 69–19, 80–12 (58); Evening: 65–56 (52), 95–8, 31–90, 65–23 (50)
90	Highest break	
0	Century breaks	0
7	50+ breaks	0
