= 1992/1993 Strachan Challenge – Event 3 =

Strachan Challenge – Event 3
Tournament information
- Dates: 1–6 February 1993
- Venue: Jimmy White Snooker Lodge
- City: Aldershot
- Country: England
- Organisation: WPBSA
- Format: Minor-ranking event
- Winner's share: £3,000

Final
- Champion: Tony Drago (MLT)
- Runner-up: Ken Doherty (IRL)
- Score: 9–7

The Strachan Challenge Series – Event 3 was a professional minor-ranking snooker tournament, that was held from 1 to 6 February 1993 at the Jimmy White Snooker Lodge in Aldershot, England.

The event was the final of three held in an effort to encourage some of the hundreds of new professionals who had joined the tour. These minor ranking events were open to all the pros but carried a much lower ranking points tariff, around ten per cent of that applicable to most of the other tournaments.

Tony Drago won the tournament by defeating Ken Doherty nine frames to seven in the final.

== Main draw ==
Last 32; Best of 9 frames
(Malta) Tony Drago	5
(Northern Ireland) Jason Prince	2
(England) Jonathan Birch	5
(England) Andy Hicks	4
(England) Tony Meo	5
(England) Nigel Bond	1
(England) Mark Johnston-Allen	5
(England) Karl Broughton	2
(Scotland) Billy Snaddon	5
(England) Jason Pegram	1
(England) Martin Clark	5
(England) Jamie Bodle	0
(England) Mick Price	5
(England) Mike Hallett	4
(Wales) Steve Newbury	5
(England) David Blakey	2
(Republic of Ireland) Ken Doherty	5
(Wales) Neil Tomkins	3
(Wales) Darren Morgan	5
(Australia) Eddie Charlton	4
(England) Nick Marsh	5
(Wales) Wayne Jones	4
(England) Nick Terry	5
(Republic of Ireland) Fergal O'Brien	1
(England) Karl Payne	5
(England) Dean Reynolds	0
(England) Nick Dyson	5
(Wales) Doug Mountjoy	4
(Canada) Alain Robidoux	5
(Wales) Paul Davies	1
(Northern Ireland) Joe Swail	5
(Wales) Anthony Davies	4

Last 16; Best of 9 frames
(Malta) Tony Drago	5
(England) Jonathan Birch	2
(England) Tony Meo	5
(England) Mark Johnston-Allen	2
(Scotland) Billy Snaddon	5
(England) Martin Clark	3
(England) Mick Price	5
(Wales) Steve Newbury	4
(Republic of Ireland) Ken Doherty	5
(Wales) Darren Morgan	4
(England) Nick Marsh	5
(England) Nick Terry	1
(England) Karl Payne	5
(England) Nick Dyson	1
(Canada) Alain Robidoux	5
(Northern Ireland) Joe Swail	4

Quarter-finals; Best of 9 frames
(Malta) Tony Drago	5
(England) Tony Meo	4
(Scotland) Billy Snaddon	5
(England) Mick Price	2
(Republic of Ireland) Ken Doherty	5
(England) Nick Marsh	1
(England) Karl Payne	5
(Canada) Alain Robidoux	2

Semi-finals; Best of 11 frames
(Malta) Tony Drago	6
(Scotland) Billy Snaddon	4
(Republic of Ireland) Ken Doherty	6
(England) Karl Payne	1

Final; Best of 17 frames
(Malta) Tony Drago	9
(Republic of Ireland) Ken Doherty	7
