= 1993 World Snooker Championship =

Professional snooker tournament

1993 Embassy World Snooker Championship
Tournament information
- Dates: 17 April – 3 May 1993
- Venue: Crucible Theatre
- City: Sheffield
- Country: England
- Organisation: WPBSA
- Format: Ranking event
- Total prize fund: £1,000,000
- Winner's share: £175,000
- Highest break: Steve Davis (ENG) (144)

Final
- Champion: Stephen Hendry (SCO)
- Runner-up: Jimmy White (ENG)
- Score: 18–5

The 1993 World Snooker Championship (also referred to as the 1993 Embassy World Snooker Championship for sponsorship reasons) was a professional ranking snooker tournament that took place between 17 April and 3 May 1993 at the Crucible Theatre in Sheffield, England. Organised by the World Professional Billiards and Snooker Association, it was the ninth and final ranking event of the 1992–93 snooker season and the seventeenth consecutive World Snooker Championship to be held at the Crucible, the first tournament at this location having taken place in 1977.

Stephen Hendry was the defending champion, having defeated Jimmy White 18–14 in the 1992 final. The two players reached the final again in 1993, and Hendry won 18–5 with a session to spare. Hendry compiled a break of 136 at his first visit to the table in the first frame of the final, setting a new record of 204 career century breaks.

Eleven rounds of qualifying for the championship were held from 19 July to 20 September at the Norbreck Hotel, Blackpool. The qualifying competition produced 16 players for the main stage, where they met the 16 invited seeded players. The tournament was broadcast in the United Kingdom on BBC2, and was sponsored by the Embassy cigarette brand. Hendry received £175,000 from the total prize fund of £1,000,000. The highest break of the main stage was 144, the fourth-highest in championship history, made by Steve Davis.

== Overview ==
The World Snooker Championship is an annual professional snooker tournament organised by the World Professional Billiards and Snooker Association (WPBSA). Founded in the late 19th century by British Army soldiers stationed in India, the cue sport was popular in the British Isles. However, in the modern era, which started in 1969 when the World Championship reverted to a knockout format, it has become increasingly popular worldwide, especially in East and Southeast Asian nations such as China, Hong Kong and Thailand.

Joe Davis won the first World Championship in 1927, hosted by the Billiards Association and Control Council, the final match being held at Camkin's Hall in Birmingham, England. The 1993 championship featured 32 professional players competing in one-on-one snooker matches in a single-elimination format, each round being played over a pre-determined number of frames, and each match divided into two or more sessions containing a set number of frames. These competitors in the main tournament were selected using a combination of the top players in the snooker world rankings and the winners of a pre-tournament qualification stage. The top 16 players in the world rankings automatically qualified for the event, the remaining 16 players coming through the qualification rounds. It was the seventeenth consecutive World Snooker Championship to be held at the Crucible, the first tournament there having taken place in 1977. The defending champion in 1993 was Stephen Hendry, who had defeated Jimmy White 18–14 in the final of the 1992 World Snooker Championship. The tournament was sponsored by cigarette brand Embassy, and was also referred to as the Embassy World Snooker Championship. The championship was broadcast on BBC2 in the UK. It was the ninth and final ranking event of the 1992–93 snooker season. The event attracted 542 entrants, a record.

=== Prize fund ===
The tournament had a total prize fund of £1,000,000, broken down as shown below.

Main stage

- Winner: £175,000
- Runner-up: £105,000
- Semi-final: £52,000
- Quarter-final: £26,000
- Last 16: £14,000
- Last 32: £8,000
- 11th qualifying round losers: £5,750
- 10th qualifying round losers: £3,400
- 9th qualifying round losers: unknown
- 8th qualifying round losers: £850
- Highest break in qualifying: £4,000
- Highest break in main event: £14,400
- Maximum break: £100,000

== Tournament summary ==
=== Qualifying ===
There were 11 rounds of matches in the qualifying competition, which was held at the Norbreck Hotel, Blackpool, from 19 July to 20 September 1992. The first seven rounds were the best-of-9-frames, and the later rounds were best-of-19. Sixteen players progressed from qualifying to the main stage where they met the 16 invited seeded players.

The reigning world amateur champion Noppadon Noppachorn beat reigning English Amateur champion Stephen Lee 5–2 in the second round. Noppachorn lost 4–5 to Darren Lennox in round 4. In the sixth round, Pat Kenny made a break of 143 during his 5–4 defeat of Norman Maher, which turned out to be the highest break of the qualifying rounds. The women's world champion Allison Fisher defeated Michael Valentine and Robert Champman to reach round six, then lost on the final black ball, 4–5 to Craig MacGillivray. Ronnie O'Sullivan lost only two frames in his first five matches, which included a whitewash of Guy Dennis in round 6. Eight-time champion Fred Davis was also whitewashed, by Mark King, and two-time champion John Spencer withdrew.

Alex Higgins, the champion in 1972 and 1982, started in the seventh round and defeated Steve Judd 5–1, Murdo MacLeod 10–9 and Kirk Stevens 10–5. In the penultimate round of qualifying, Higgins lost 1–10 to Brian Morgan, and said afterwards that there should be drug tests for him and his opponent, Morgan had played so well: "I've never seen anyone play like a machine before. It was surreal snooker." Morgan responded by demanding that he was drug-tested as he had nothing to hide, and a test was carried out. The test result was negative. The 1980 winner Cliff Thorburn lost in his first match, 7–10 to Stephen O'Connor in round nine.

In the last round of qualifying, Les Dodd had a walkover when Eddie Charlton's flight back from a pool tournament in the United States was delayed, meaning that he was in the plane at the time that match started. Joe Johnson, the 1986 World Champion, lost 6–10 to Karl Payne. Joe Swail, the Irish professional champion, won eight consecutive frames from 2–7 down to beat Mike Hallett 10–7.

Eight players qualified for their debut at the main stage of the World Championship. First-season professional Spencer Dunn won 11 matches to reach the main stage, which remained a record as of 2026. Two other players in their first professional season, John Giles and O'Sullivan, each won ten matches to qualify. O'Sullivan was the youngest player ever to qualify for the World Championship main stage. He became the second-youngest player to compete at the main stage, at 17 years and 5 months old, two months older than Stephen Hendry had been at his debut in 1986. The other debutants this year were Morgan, Swail, Payne, Shaun Mellish and O'Connor.

Snooker historian Clive Everton attributed the high number of debutants to the governing body's decision to hold pre-qualifying at the beginning of the season. According to Everton, "This had created the situation whereby relatively inexperienced players could become match hardened in the summer qualifying school and then catch cold many established players just outside the top 16 in the rankings, which would have exempted them from the qualifying competition."

=== First round ===
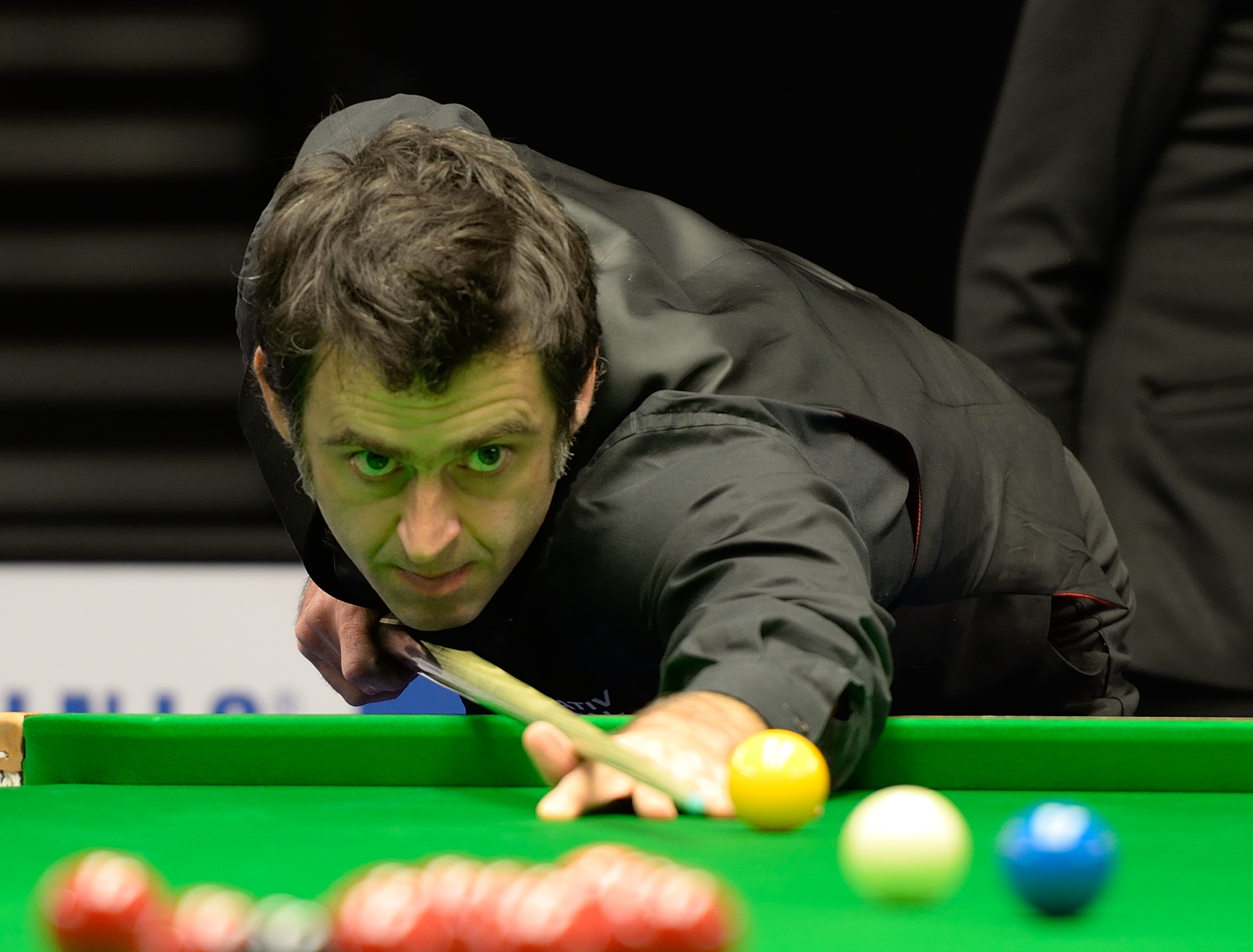
Ronnie O'Sullivan (pictured in 2015) was the youngest player ever to qualify for the World Championship main stage, and the second-youngest player to compete at the main stage.

The first round took place between 17 and 22 April, each match played over two sessions as the best of 19 frames. In frame three of his first-round match against Danny Fowler, Hendry compiled the 250th century break at the Crucible, a 124. Three frames later, he made a 128 break, the 200th century break of his career. Fowler won only the tenth frame; Hendry won 10–1. Morgan established a 5–1 lead against Dodd before Dodd took the last three frames of the first session to trail 4–5. In the second session, Morgan lost only the second frame and completed a 10–5 victory. Nigel Bond converted a 6–3 first-session lead into a 10–4 win against Spencer Dunn. The first session of the match between Gary Wilkinson and Dean Reynolds was described by Everton as "perhaps the worst ever seen here in 16 years of championship play." The highest break of the session was only 34, and both players made numerous unforced errors. Wilkinson made two breaks of 58 and a break of 101 in the second session as he ran out a 10–4 winner.

Martin Clark defeated Karl Payne 10–6 and commented afterwards that "He's a bit of a slow player that likes to grind it out and that made it a struggle". Guy Hodgson of The Independent wrote that "it was tortuous progress at times as the play was heavily laced with safety. By the end the audience was exhausted, never mind the players." Neal Foulds retained his place in the top 16 of the rankings by progressing to the second round with a 10–5 win against Morgan; the highest break of the match was 108 by Foulds in frame nine to lead 6–3. O'Sullivan lost 7–10 against Alan McManus. Everton felt that O'Sullivan had been affected by the pressure, and that his "brilliant long pots were counter-balanced by unforced errors at close quarters." Peter Ebdon had defeated Steve Davis 10–4 in the previous year's championship. In the two months leading up to the 1993 Championship, Davis had won the European Open, the British Open and the Irish Masters, and he beat Ebdon 10–3. Davis remarked that "There were no feelings of revenge. If you have a grudge it's more difficult to play well.

Jimmy White took a 7–2 lead against Swail into the second session of their match, and although Swail won frames ten and eleven, White went on to win 10–4. Alain Robidoux's 6–10 loss to Doug Mountjoy meant that he would drop out of the top 16; Mountjoy commented after that he sensed that Robidoux had played "with fear in his heart". Dennis Taylor's 10–9 win against Tony Drago was sealed with a break of 46 in the deciding frame after Drago had missed an attempt to pot a red after a poor positional shot. Terry Griffiths won the first six frames against David Roe, and Roe won the next four frames. Griffiths compiled a break of 133 in frame 12, and won the match 10–6.

James Wattana made a break of 103 in the seventh frame of his 10–7 win against Tony Jones. Steve James made two century breaks, 106 and 138, while establishing an 8–1 lead against Giles and won the match 10–2 after needing a snooker to take frame 12. Willie Thorne won five of the nine frames of the first session against Mellish. Mellish was again only one frame behind at 6–7, then Thorne took three consecutive frames to prevail 10–6. O'Connor won frame six as he lost 1–10 to 1991 champion John Parrott.

=== Second round ===
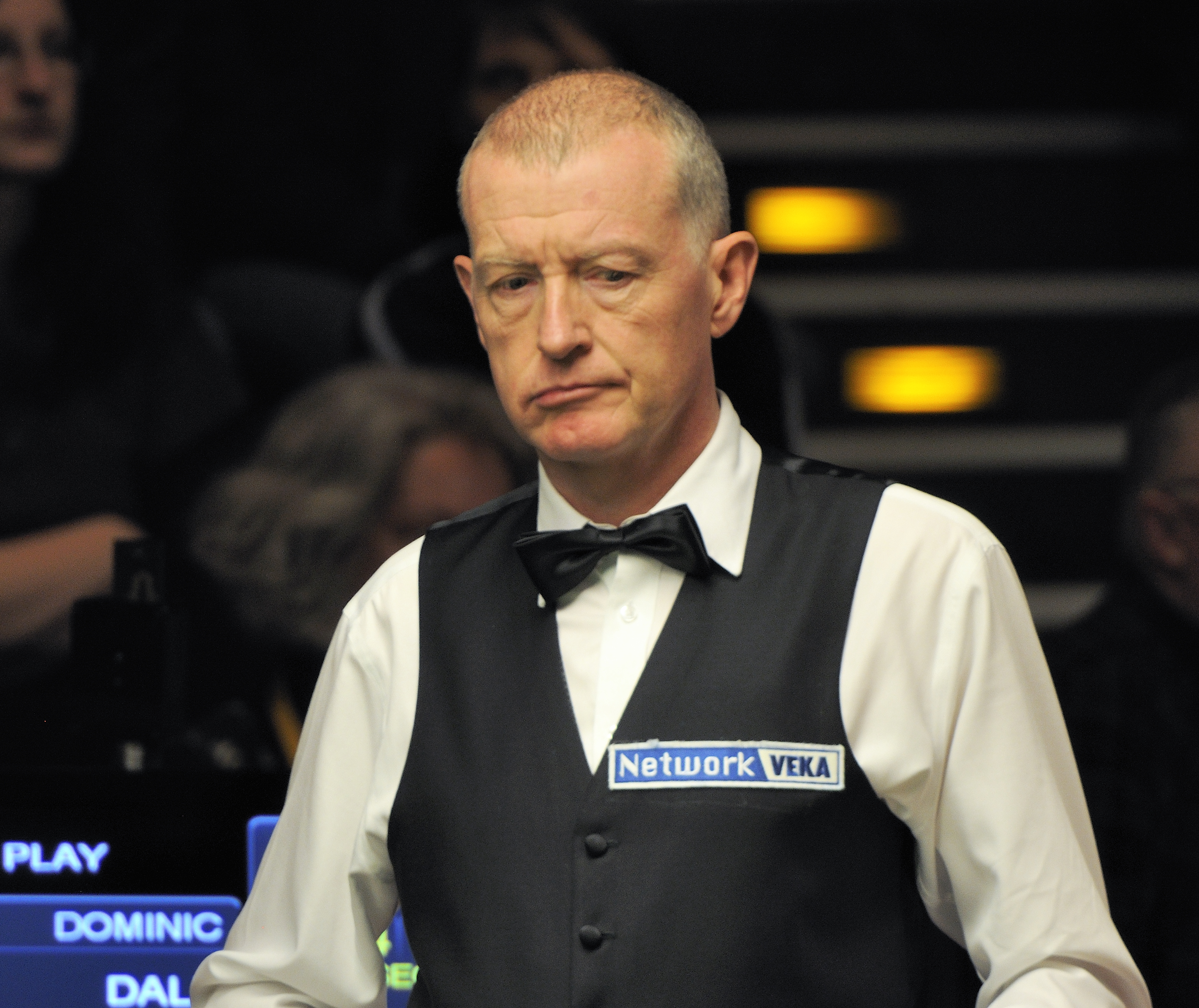
Steve Davis (pictured in 2014) made a break of 144, the highest break of the tournament, and the fourth-highest in championship history.

The second round, which took place between 22 and 26 April, was played as best-of-25-frames matches spread over three sessions. Hendry won both of the first two sessions against Morgan 6–2, and had a break of 113 in frame 16. He won 13–4. Bond recovered from 2–4 down to lead Wilkinson 9–7, and won 13–9.

Foulds had never beaten Clark in any of their four previous meetings in ranking tournaments, but led 6–2 after the first session, then 10–6 after the second session, and won 13–7. Davis made the highest break of the tournament, and the fourth-highest in championship history, with a 144 in the third frame against McManus. Despite this, he trailed 1–4 before levelling at 4–4. McManus built a 12–9 lead, which Davis narrowed by winning the next two frames. After Davis missed an attempt to pot the blue ball in frame 24, McManus cleared the colours to win 13–11. Speaking after the match, Davis said about the missed blue, "I'm not upset about missing it. You're allowed to miss balls in this championship."

White compiled five breaks over 50, including a 108 as he built a 5–3 lead against Mountjoy. From 11–5 at the end of the second session, he beat Mountjoy 13–6. Griffiths and Taylor faced each other at the championship for the first time since the 1979 final; Taylor won 13–11 in a match that lasted over 13 hours and finished at 1:40 am.

Wattana made three century breaks in his 13–7 defeat of James: a 110 in frame six and 104s in frames 10 and 13. Thorne and Parrott were level at 4–4 after their first session, but Parrott took the next five frames and eventually won 13–9.

=== Quarter-finals ===
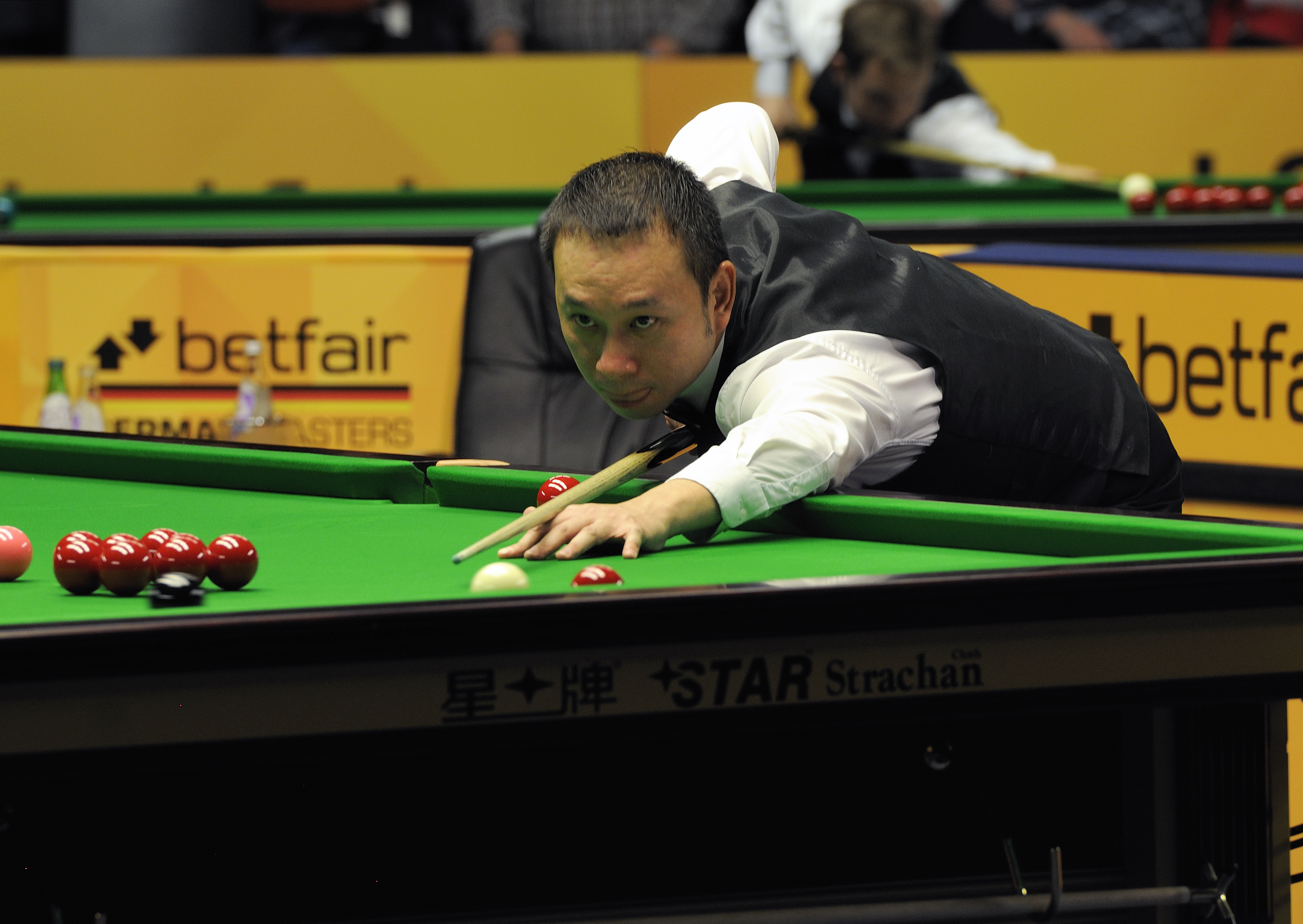
James Wattana (pictured in 2013) became the first player from the Far East ever to reach the championship semi-finals.

The quarter-finals were played as best-of-25-frames matches over three sessions on 27 and 28 April. Hendry led Bond 6–2 after one session. In the second session, Hendry made a break of 129, while Bond had breaks of 139 and 110. Hendry moved from a 11–5 lead after two sessions to a 13–7 victory. Foulds made a 124 break in the first session against McManus, which finished 4–4. He had breaks of 100 in both the second and third sessions, but lost 11–13.

White trailed Taylor 2–5 but then won seven of the next eight frames, and eventually won 13–8. Wattana, from Thailand, became the first player from the Far East ever to reach the semi-finals of the event when he beat Parrott. In the first session, both players made a number of mistakes. Despite Parrott compiling a 122 break, Wattana took a 5–3 lead. They were tied at 5–5 but Wattana then took six consecutive frames and went on to win 13–6.

=== Semi-finals ===
The semi-finals took place between 29 April and 1 May as best-of-31-frames matches played over four sessions. McManus and Hendry, both from Scotland, entered the arena to music played by a Scottish piper. Hendry later wrote that he was annoyed by this, as he felt it was inappropriate for a serious match and "if there's one thing I can't stand it's the sound of those bloody pipes. I'm furious but there's little I can do except grit my teeth and get on with focusing on the game." Hendry took a 3–0 lead, but McManus won the next four frames; their first session finished with them at 4–4. The first frame of the second session was won by McManus, but Hendry took the other seven. It was 15–7 to Hendry after the third session, and he won 16–8. Hendry's break of 110 in the 22nd frame was his 33rd in a World Championship match, surpassing Davis's record. It also brought Hendry, who had been a professional for eight years, to a career total of 203 century breaks, equalling the record number that Davis had achieved in 15 years.

Wattana built a 5–0 lead against White, and finished the first session 5–2 up. From 2–6, White made breaks of 104 and 108 and won 12 consecutive frames for a 14–8 lead. After losing 9–16, Wattana remarked that his concentration had been "very much on and off" during the match. Guy Hodgson of The Independent commented that in winning the streak of 12 frames, White had "an almost hypnotic intensity about him". The match was broadcast live by BBC satellite transmission to around 13 million viewers in Thailand.

=== Final ===
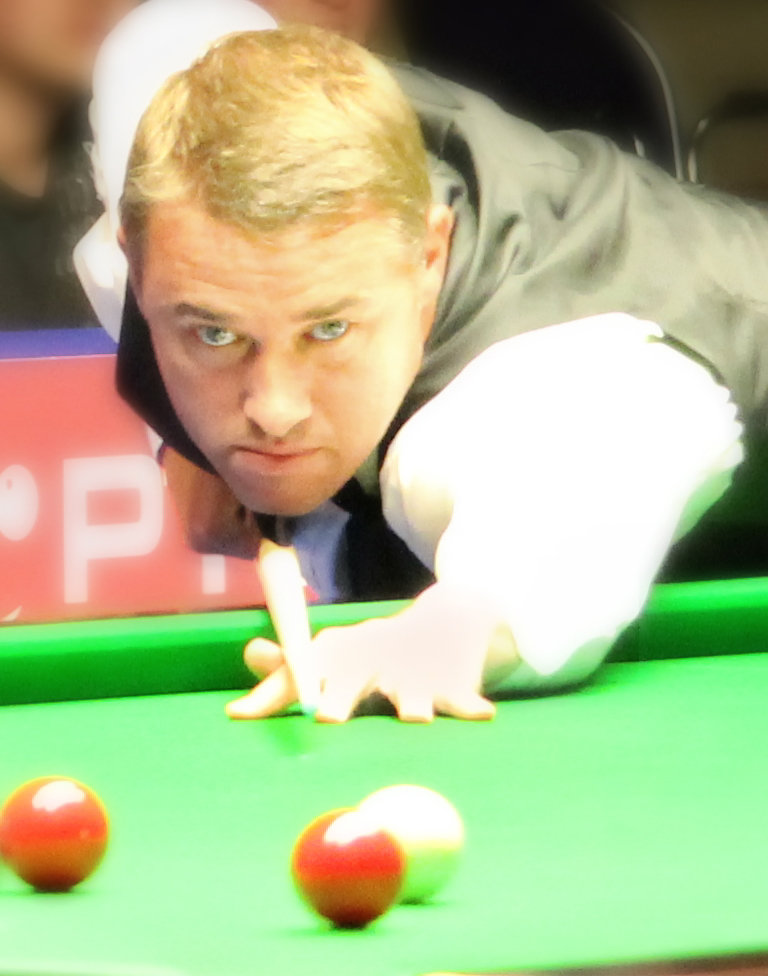
Stephen Hendry (pictured in 2011) won the title for the third time.

The final between Stephen Hendry and Jimmy White was played as the best-of-35 frames across four sessions on 2 and 3 May. Hendry compiled a break of 136 at his first visit to the table to win the first frame, setting a new record of 204 career century breaks. White took the second frame, but lost frame three despite a break of 54, after Hendry made a 63. Hendry moved into a 5–1 lead, making breaks of 76 in the fifth frame and 126 in the sixth frame, then White won the last frame of the first session. After session two, Hendry was 12–4 ahead. A 123 in the ninth frame was Hendry's eighth century break of the tournament, equalling the record held by Davis and Parrott.

Hendry's 18–5 victory over White was only the third time since the championship moved to the Crucible that the title was settled in the afternoon with a session to spare. The previous two were in 1983 and 1989. Everton wrote that Hendry "dominated the championship so thoroughly that it was easy to forget the inconsistency which had plagued him for most of the season." In The Independent Hodgson wrote that the difference between the players during the final "was every bit as emphatic as the scoreline suggests. Indeed, there were some who believed it flattered White." Hodgson saw a recurring pattern during the match where White would miss and then Hendry would make a significant break.

White wrote in his autobiography Second Wind that he had low expectations coming into the championship, as he was separated from his wife Maureen and had "spent months on the piss (Note: "on the piss" – drinking a large amount of alcohol) and coke (Note: cocaine), running around like a madman, and generally just forgetting about snooker." He added that he felt he "fell over the line" in each match on the way to the final, and that in the final was "out-played and outclassed by the best player in the world." In Hendry's autobiography Me and the Table, he wrote that he was confident of victory going into the tournament: "I don't take winning for granted, yet I knew I was going to win this, and maybe I don't feel it's that big a deal."

The final attracted a peak of 4.6m viewers on BBC2. Everton wrote in Snooker Scene that "some snooker tournaments produce a series of dramatic conflicts and developments that catch the imagination of the public. Others do not and this was one of them."

The world rankings received their annual revision after the championship. Hendry retained his first place in the 1993–94 ranking list, extending his lead over second-placed John Parrott with 50,050 points to Parrott's 44,200. White and Davis stayed in third and fourth places respectively. Wattana moved from seventh to fifth, and McManus rose from 13th to 6th.

== Main draw ==
Shown below are the results for each round. The numbers in parentheses beside some of the players are their seedings.

First round Best of 19 frames
17 April
Stephen Hendry (SCO) (1)	10
Danny Fowler (ENG)	1
17 & 18 April
Darren Morgan (WAL) (16)	10
Les Dodd (ENG)	5
18 & 19 April
Nigel Bond (ENG) (9)	10
Spencer Dunn (ENG)	4
19 & 20 April
Gary Wilkinson (ENG) (8)	10
Dean Reynolds (ENG)	4
20 April
Neal Foulds (ENG) (5)	10
Brian Morgan (ENG)	5
21 & 22 April
Martin Clark (ENG) (12)	10
Karl Payne (ENG)	6
18 & 19 April
Alan McManus (SCO) (13)	10
Ronnie O'Sullivan (ENG)	7
21 April
Steve Davis (ENG) (4)	10
Peter Ebdon (ENG)	3
17 & 18 April
Jimmy White (ENG) (3)	10
Joe Swail (IRE)	4
21 & 22 April
Alain Robidoux (CAN) (14)	6
Doug Mountjoy (WAL)	10
19 April
Dennis Taylor (NIR) (11)	10
Tony Drago (MLT)	9
20 & 21 April
Terry Griffiths (WAL) (6)	10
David Roe (ENG)	6
20 & 21 April
James Wattana (THA) (7)	10
Tony Jones (ENG)	7
19 & 20 April
Steve James (ENG) (10)	10
John Giles (ENG)	2
17 April
Willie Thorne (ENG) (15)	10
Shaun Mellish (ENG)	6
18 April
John Parrott (ENG) (2)	10
Stephen O'Connor (IRE)	1

Second round Best of 25 frames
22, 23 & 24 April
Stephen Hendry (SCO) (1)	13
Darren Morgan (WAL) (16)	4
23 & 24 April
Nigel Bond (ENG) (9)	13
Gary Wilkinson (ENG) (8)	7
25 & 26 April
Neal Foulds (ENG) (5)	13
Martin Clark (ENG) (12)	7
24, 25 & 26 April
Alan McManus (SCO) (13)	13
Steve Davis (ENG) (4)	11
24, 25 & 26 April
Jimmy White (ENG) (3)	13
Doug Mountjoy (WAL)	6
23 & 24 April
Dennis Taylor (NIR) (11)	13
Terry Griffiths (WAL) (6)	11
25 & 26 April
James Wattana (THA) (7)	13
Steve James (ENG) (10)	7
22 & 23 April
Willie Thorne (ENG) (15)	9
John Parrott (ENG) (2)	13

Quarter-finals; Best of 25 frames
27 & 28 April
Stephen Hendry (SCO) (1)	13
Nigel Bond (ENG) (9)	7
27 & 28 April
Neal Foulds (ENG) (5)	11
Alan McManus (SCO) (13)	13
27 & 28 April
Jimmy White (ENG) (3)	13
Dennis Taylor (NIR) (11)	8
27 & 28 April
James Wattana (THA) (7)	13
John Parrott (ENG) (2)	6

Semi-finals; Best of 31 frames
29, 30 April & 1 May
Stephen Hendry (SCO) (1)	16
Alan McManus (SCO) (13)	8
29, 30 April & 1 May
Jimmy White (ENG) (3)	16
James Wattana (THA) (7)	9

Final; Best of 35 frames
2 & 3 May
Stephen Hendry (SCO) (1)	18
Jimmy White (ENG) (3)	5

=== Final: frame scores ===
Final: (Best of 35 frames) Crucible Theatre, Sheffield, 2 and 3 May 1993; Referee: Len Ganley
Stephen Hendry (SCO) (1)				18–5			Jimmy White (ENG) (3)			
Session 1: 5–3
Frame	1	2	3	4	5	6	7	8	9	10
Hendry	136^{†} (136)	37	68^{†} (63)	63^{†}	76^{†} (76)	126^{†} (126)	29	39	N/A	N/A
White	0	65^{†} (58)	63 (54)	48	0	1	83^{†}	68^{†}	N/A	N/A
Session 2: 7–1 (12–4)
Frame	1	2	3	4	5	6	7	8	9	10
Hendry	75^{†} (69)	80^{†} (79)	134^{†} (88)	38	99^{†} (99)	77^{†}	80^{†}	68^{†} (59)	N/A	N/A
White	50	0	0	69^{†} (60)	0	38	7	6	N/A	N/A
Session 3: 6–1 (18–5)
Frame	1	2	3	4	5	6	7	8	9	10
Hendry	81^{†} (59)	68^{†}	123^{†} (123)	1	63^{†}	72^{†}	127^{†} (54, 73)	N/A	N/A	N/A
White	46	20	16	84^{†}	15	0	0	N/A	N/A	N/A
Session 4: N/A
Frame	1	2	3	4	5	6	7	8	9	10
Hendry	N/A	N/A	N/A	N/A	N/A	N/A	N/A	N/A	N/A	N/A
White	N/A	N/A	N/A	N/A	N/A	N/A	N/A	N/A	N/A	N/A
136				Highest break			60			
3				Century breaks			0			
13				50+ breaks			3			
Stephen Hendry wins the 1993 World Snooker Championship; Breaks over 50 are shown in parentheses. † = Winner of frame

== Qualifying results ==
Eleven qualifying rounds were played.

=== Rounds 1–7 ===
Results for rounds 1 to 7 are shown below.

First qualifying round Best of 9 frames
Paul Moss (ENG)	5
Robert Clifforth (ENG)	2
Carl Waters (ENG)	5
Martin O'Neill (NIR)	0
Paul Lawrence (ENG)	5
Mark Congram (ENG)	1
Gary Morris (ENG)	5
James Gibson (ENG)	4
Stephen Roberts (ENG)	5
Dean Bracey (ENG)	1
Neil Tomkins (WAL)	5
Richard Culham (ENG)	3
Eddie Lott (ENG)	5
Steve Gough (ENG)	1
Neil Davies (ENG)	w/o
Donald Lelievre (CAN)	w/d
Alfonso Bellusci (ENG)	5
Grant Peabody (ENG)	1
Jamie Burnett (SCO)	5
Alexander Ferguson (ENG)	1
Mark Canovan (NZL)	5
Suriya Suwannasingh (THA)	4
Spencer Dunn (ENG)	5
Ian Bullimore (ENG)	1
Chris Wright (ENG)	5
Alan Brookes (ENG)	4
Andrew Hannah (ENG)	5
Jonathan Saunders (ENG)	0
Nick Pearce (ENG)	5
Brett Patmore (ENG)	1
Ian Sargeant (WAL)	5
Mark Gray (ENG)	2
Bryngmar Valdimarsson (ISL)	5
Andrew Shaw (ENG)	2
David Mellon (ENG)	5
Mario Wehrmann (NED)	3
Paul Davison (ENG)	5
Mark Whatley (ENG)	3
Darren Limburg (ENG)	5
Wilson Dornan (SCO)	0
Brian Smits (NED)	5
John Disney (ENG)	0
David Wilson (ENG)	5
Mark Williams (WAL)	2
Ramu Vaswani (ENG)	5
Paul Davis (ENG)	3
Joe Canny (IRE)	5
Ian McCulloch (ENG)	1
Dominic Dale (WAL)	5
Charles Vos (CAN)	1
Anthony Halpin (ENG)	5
Richard Cleeter (ENG)	1
Andrew Essilfie (ENG)	5
Paul Florence (ENG)	1
Matthew Spade (ENG)	5
Andrea Barbacane (ITA)	0
Brent Wells (NZL)	5
Craig Harrison (ENG)	3
Shaun Berry (ENG)	5
Stephen Kiddle (ENG)	2

Second qualifying round Best of 9 frames
Peter Delaney (ENG)	3
Paul Moss (ENG)	5
Nicholas Segal (ENG)	1
Carl Waters (ENG)	5
Clive Bernstone (ENG)	3
Paul Lawrence (ENG)	5
Del Smith (ENG)	5
Gary Morris (ENG)	2
Kevin Johnstone (ENG)	2
Stephen Roberts (ENG)	5
Ronnie Shakespeare (ENG)	0
Neil Tomkins (WAL)	5
Foizur Rahman (ENG)	0
Eddie Lott (ENG)	5
Trevor Holtby (ENG)	5
Neil Davies (ENG)	0
Chris Milner (ENG)	1
Alfonso Bellusci (ENG)	5
Clement Walden (ENG)	w/d
Jamie Burnett (SCO)	w/o
Barry O'Loughlin (IRE)	3
Mark Canovan (NZL)	5
Colin Mitchell (ENG)	1
Spencer Dunn (ENG)	5
Gavin Burns (ENG)	5
Chris Wright (ENG)	3
Ryan Milton (ENG)	3
Andrew Hannah (ENG)	5
Frank Smith (ENG)	0
Nick Pearce (ENG)	5
Glenn Stevenson (ENG)	5
Ian Sargeant (WAL)	4
Simon Morfitt (ENG)	5
Bryngmar Valdimarsson (ISL)	4
Alistair Fleming (SCO)	5
David Mellon (ENG)	1
Stephen Taylor (ENG)	5
Paul Davison (ENG)	3
Steve Archer (ENG)	5
Darren Limburg (ENG)	2
Chris Scanlon (ENG)	5
Brian Smits (NED)	3
Paul Clarke (ENG)	5
David Wilson (ENG)	3
Andrew Fisher (ENG)	2
Ramu Vaswani (ENG)	5
Ian Hurdman (ENG)	5
Joe Canny (IRE)	1
Jamie Bodle (ENG)	3
Dominic Dale (WAL)	5
Alan Edmonds (ENG)	3
Anthony Halpin (ENG)	5
Brian Peddie (ENG)	5
Andrew Essilfie (ENG)	1
Ronnie O'Sullivan (ENG)	5
Matthew Spade (ENG)	0
Chris Henry (ENG)	5
Brent Wells (NZL)	4
Lee Walters (ENG)	5
Shaun Berry (ENG)	1
Sefton Payne (ENG)	5
Iain Trimble (ENG)	2
Matthew Davies (ENG)	5
Peter Kippie (CAN)	2
Nick Marsh (ENG)	5
Gunnar Valsson (ISL)	1
Len Davies (ENG)	5
Darren Martin (ENG)	2
Jayson Morris (ENG)	5
David Buskin (ENG)	3
David Mole (ENG)	5
Martin Dziewialtowski (SCO)	4
Jason Scott (ENG)	5
Mark Ganderton (ENG)	3
Steve Bradley (ENG)	5
Max Cockrell (ENG)	3
Michael Judge (IRE)	5
David Stone (ENG)	1
Chris Hamson (ENG)	5
Michael O'Sullivan (ENG)	3
Nick Jones (ENG)	5
Gary Skipworth (ENG)	3
Shawn Budd (AUS)	5
Philip Alden (ENG)	0
David Blagg (ENG)	5
Huseyin Hursid (TUR)	0
Donald Newcombe (WAL)	5
Matthew Couch (ENG)	2
James Vicarey (ENG)	5
Richard Batty (ENG)	3
Kieran McMahon (NIR)	5
Mark Williams (ENG)	3
David Thompson (ENG)	5
Gary Miller (ENG)	2
David Blakey (ENG)	5
Stephen Popplewell (ENG)	3
Paul Davison (ENG)	5
John Horsfall (CAN)	3
Steven Evans (ENG)	5
Andrew Farrow (ENG)	2
Ray van den Nouwland (AUS)	5
Russ Schuster (ENG)	4
Mark O'Sullivan (IRE)	5
Mike Russell (ENG)	3
John Giles (ENG)	5
Tessa Davidson (ENG)	3
Sonic Multani (IND)	5
Yasin Merchant (IND)	2
Philip Freeman (ENG)	5
John McBride (IRE)	1
John Higgins (SCO)	5
Malcolm Billaney (ENG)	0
John Knipe (ENG)	5
Peter Tolen (ENG)	3
Noppadon Noppachorn (THA)	5
Stephen Lee (ENG)	4
Gary Bampton (ENG)	5
Craig McDonald (SCO)	4
Jason Baker (ENG)	5
Darren Skinner (ENG)	3
Richard Wheelhouse (ENG)	w/o
Roger Garrett (ENG)	w/d
Peter Bullen (BEL)	5
Martin Lee (ENG)	1
Scott MacFarlane (SCO)	5
Stuart Pettman (ENG)	4
Udesh Pillay (ENG)	5
Colin Hinds (ENG)	4

Third qualifying round Best of 9 frames
Aidan Murphy (IRE)	5
Paul Moss (ENG)	2
Stuart Pegrum (ENG)	1
Carl Waters (ENG)	5
Mark Darnes (ENG)	2
Paul Lawrence (ENG)	5
Lyndon Smith (ENG)	5
Del Smith (ENG)	3
Neil Martin (SCO)	4
Stephen Roberts (ENG)	5
Steve Harrison (ENG)	0
Neil Tomkins (WAL)	5
Simon Westcott (ENG)	1
Eddie Lott (ENG)	5
Richard Pipe (ENG)	4
Trevor Holtby (ENG)	5
Fjolnir Thorgeirsson (ISL)	5
Alfonso Bellusci (ENG)	4
John Lardner (SCO)	3
Jamie Burnett (SCO)	5
David Athorn (ENG)	5
Mark Canovan (NZL)	3
Elliott Clark (ENG)	4
Spencer Dunn (ENG)	5
Mike Henson (GER)	w/d
Gavin Burns (ENG)	w/o
Nick Stanfield (ENG)	0
Andrew Hannah (ENG)	5
Andrew Prydden (ENG)	1
Nick Pearce (ENG)	5
John Benton (IRE)	3
Glenn Stevenson (ENG)	5
Hitesh Lakhani (ENG)	5
Simon Morfitt (ENG)	2
David Hoggarth (ENG)	3
Alistair Fleming (SCO)	5
Richard McHugh (IRE)	5
Stephen Taylor (ENG)	3
Michael Eaves (ENG)	1
Steve Archer (ENG)	5
Stuart Mann (ENG)	2
Chris Scanlon (ENG)	5
Andrew Photiou (ENG)	5
Paul Clarke (ENG)	4
Mark Jervis (ENG)	1
Ramu Vaswani (ENG)	5
Tim Dunphy (IRE)	0
Ian Hurdman (ENG)	5
Philip Seaton (ENG)	3
Dominic Dale (WAL)	5
Sacha Journet (ENG)	4
Anthony Halpin (ENG)	5
Karen Corr (NIR)	5
Brian Peddie (ENG)	0
Robert Thallon (SCO)	1
Ronnie O'Sullivan (ENG)	5
Steven Cook (ENG)	3
Chris Henry (ENG)	5
Tony Bolahood (CAN)	1
Lee Walters (ENG)	5
Chris Capel (ENG)	4
Sefton Payne (ENG)	5
Ahmed Hussein Gamal (EGY)	2
Matthew Davies (ENG)	5
John Harrop (ENG)	2
Nick Marsh (ENG)	5
Graham Stevens (ENG)	2
Len Davies (ENG)	5
Gary Thomas (SCO)	4
Jayson Morris (ENG)	5
Jimmy O'Shea (ENG)	3
David Mole (ENG)	5
Kevin Brown (ENG)	1
Jason Scott (ENG)	5
Martin Grainger (ENG)	5
Steve Bradley (ENG)	2
Peter Peratikou (ENG)	4
Michael Judge (IRE)	5
Richard King (ENG)	1
Chris Hamson (ENG)	5
Gerry Jones (IRE)	0
Nick Jones (ENG)	5
Chris Achilles (ENG)	2
Shawn Budd (AUS)	5
Michael Valentine (SCO)	5
David Blagg (ENG)	4
Micky Roughan (IRE)	5
Donald Newcombe (WAL)	3
Christopher Booth (ENG)	1
James Vicarey (ENG)	5
Neil Cameron (ENG)	2
Kieran McMahon (NIR)	5
Luke Spiller (ENG)	5
David Thompson (ENG)	2
Andrew Alexandrou (ENG)	1
David Blakey (ENG)	5
Robert Yule (ENG)	4
Paul Davison (ENG)	5
Nick Jones (WAL)	3
Steven Evans (ENG)	5
Gary Peters (WAL)	2
Ray van den Nouwland (AUS)	5
Andrew Clark (ENG)	2
Mark O'Sullivan (IRE)	5
Stan Haslam (ENG)	1
John Giles (ENG)	5
Jason Curtis (ENG)	4
Sonic Multani (IND)	5
Shane Haines (ENG)	5
Philip Freeman (ENG)	4
Paul Hurren (ENG)	0
John Higgins (SCO)	5
Steve Whalley (ENG)	4
John Knipe (ENG)	5
Frank Fitzgerald (ENG)	0
Noppadon Noppachorn (THA)	5
Roy Bigg (ENG)	5
Gary Bampton (ENG)	1
Peter Williams (WAL)	0
Jason Baker (ENG)	5
Gregg Tugby (ENG)	0
Richard Wheelhouse (ENG)	5
Timothy Paling (ENG)	3
Peter Bullen (BEL)	5
Karl Townsend (ENG)	5
Scott MacFarlane (SCO)	3
Mark Peevers (ENG)	4
Udesh Pillay (ENG)	5

Fourth qualifying round Best of 9 frames
Chris Nicholson (ENG)	5
Aidan Murphy (IRE)	2
Michael Kirkham (ENG)	1
Carl Waters (ENG)	5
John Clouden (ENG)	3
Paul Lawrence (ENG)	5
Anthony Buckley (ENG)	5
Lyndon Smith (ENG)	3
Pat Horne (ENG)	5
Stephen Roberts (ENG)	4
Lee Richardson (ENG)	4
Neil Tomkins (WAL)	5
Jonathan Bagley (ENG)	5
Eddie Lott (ENG)	1
Neil Figgins (ENG)	4
Trevor Holtby (ENG)	5
Mike Smith (ENG)	5
Fjolnir Thorgeirsson (ISL)	0
Pete Seager (ENG)	5
Jamie Burnett (SCO)	1
Micky Wareham (ENG)	5
David Athorn (ENG)	3
Neil Selman (ENG)	1
Spencer Dunn (ENG)	5
Louis Fazekas (CAN)	0
Gavin Burns (ENG)	5
Geet Sethi (IND)	5
Andrew Hannah (ENG)	3
Sukhbir Grewal (ENG)	2
Nick Pearce (ENG)	5
Antony Bolsover (ENG)	5
Glenn Stevenson (ENG)	4
Garry Baldrey (ENG)	5
Hitesh Lakhani (ENG)	4
John Rees (ENG)	3
Alistair Fleming (SCO)	5
Nicky Lazarus (ENG)	5
Richard McHugh (IRE)	2
Kevin Lownds (ENG)	2
Steve Archer (ENG)	5
Paul Hefford (ENG)	5
Chris Scanlon (ENG)	2
John Leahy (IRE)	5
Andrew Photiou (ENG)	3
George Wood (ENG)	1
Ramu Vaswani (ENG)	5
Anton Bishop (ENG)	3
Ian Hurdman (ENG)	5
Robert Harrhy (WAL)	1
Dominic Dale (WAL)	5
John Herbert (WAL)	5
Anthony Halpin (ENG)	2
Richard Pincott (ENG)	5
Karen Corr (NIR)	3
Patrick Mahon (IRE)	0
Ronnie O'Sullivan (ENG)	5
Michael Leach (ENG)	4
Chris Henry (ENG)	5
Wayne Lloyd (WAL)	5
Lee Walters (ENG)	4
David Rice (ENG)	2
Sefton Payne (ENG)	5
Daryl Peach (ENG)	5
Matthew Davies (ENG)	4
Peter McCullagh (ENG)	5
Nick Marsh (ENG)	3
Marc Devon (ENG)	2
Len Davies (ENG)	5
Mike Dunn (ENG)	4
Jayson Morris (ENG)	5
Jamie Rous (ENG)	5
David Mole (ENG)	0
Iwan Jones (WAL)	5
Jason Scott (ENG)	4
David McLellan (SCO)	5
Martin Grainger (ENG)	0
Justin Buckingham (ENG)	3
Michael Judge (IRE)	5
Gaye Burns (IRE)	4
Chris Hamson (ENG)	5
John Manley (ENG)	5
Nick Jones (ENG)	2
Chris Carpenter (ENG)	2
Shawn Budd (AUS)	5
Allison Fisher (ENG)	5
Michael Valentine (SCO)	4
Paul Smith (ENG)	1
Micky Roughan (IRE)	5
Jason Hawen (ENG)	5
James Vicarey (ENG)	4
Tony Emmott (ENG)	0
Kieran McMahon (NIR)	5
Paul McDonald (ENG)	5
Luke Spiller (ENG)	4
Cary Kikis (ENG)	5
David Blakey (ENG)	4
Anthony Taylor (ENG)	3
Paul Davison (ENG)	5
Jerry Williams (ENG)	4
Steven Evans (ENG)	5
Steve Elliott (ENG)	4
Ray van den Nouwland (AUS)	5
David Lazenby (ENG)	4
Mark O'Sullivan (IRE)	5
Paul Maskell (ENG)	1
John Giles (ENG)	5
Hassan Vaizie (ENG)	3
Sonic Multani (IND)	5
Colin Kelly (ENG)	5
Shane Haines (ENG)	2
Michael Gold (ENG)	5
John Higgins (SCO)	2
Ann-Marie Farren (ENG)	3
John Knipe (ENG)	5
Darren Lennox (IRE)	5
Noppadon Noppachorn (THA)	4
Terrance Burke (ENG)	5
Roy Bigg (ENG)	4
Michael Huntingdon (ENG)	5
Jason Baker (ENG)	0
Norman Maher (WAL)	5
Richard Wheelhouse (ENG)	4
Norman MacLachlan (SCO)	2
Peter Bullen (BEL)	5
Philip Minchin (ENG)	4
Karl Townsend (ENG)	5
David Singh (IND)	5
Udesh Pillay (ENG)	1

Fifth qualifying round Best of 9 frames
Simon Parker (ENG)	0
Chris Nicholson (ENG)	5
David Langton (ENG)	4
Carl Waters (ENG)	5
Craig Johnston-Allen (ENG)	5
Paul Lawrence (ENG)	4
John Burns (ENG)	5
Anthony Buckley (ENG)	4
Darryn Walker (ENG)	2
Pat Horne (ENG)	5
Anthony O'Connor (IRE)	5
Neil Tomkins (WAL)	4
Lee Grant (ENG)	3
Jonathan Bagley (ENG)	5
Tom Finstad (CAN)	5
Trevor Holtby (ENG)	2
Stacey Hillyard (ENG)	4
Mike Smith (ENG)	5
Graham Fisken (ENG)	3
Pete Seager (ENG)	5
Steve Ventham (ENG)	4
Micky Wareham (ENG)	5
Julian Goodyear (ENG)	1
Spencer Dunn (ENG)	5
Steve Russell (ENG)	5
Gavin Burns (ENG)	2
Surinder Gill (ENG)	5
Geet Sethi (IND)	2
Darren Hackeson (ENG)	0
Nick Pearce (ENG)	5
Steve Mifsud (AUS)	2
Antony Bolsover (ENG)	5
Jason Wallace (ENG)	5
Garry Baldrey (ENG)	3
Paul Morgan (ENG)	5
Alistair Fleming (SCO)	1
Mark Flowerdew (ENG)	5
Nicky Lazarus (ENG)	0
Darren Guest (ENG)	5
Steve Archer (ENG)	4
Stuart Swinburn (ENG)	0
Paul Hefford (ENG)	5
Mark King (ENG)	5
John Leahy (IRE)	2
Paul Dawkins (WAL)	5
Ramu Vaswani (ENG)	3
Michael Stocks (ENG)	3
Ian Hurdman (ENG)	5
Bert Demarco (SCO)	0
Dominic Dale (WAL)	5
Robert Marshall (ENG)	5
John Herbert (WAL)	4
Leigh Robinson (ENG)	5
Richard Pincott (ENG)	3
Robert Tavagna (AUS)	1
Ronnie O'Sullivan (ENG)	5
Steve Lemmens (BEL)	5
Chris Henry (ENG)	3
John Timson (ENG)	5
Wayne Lloyd (WAL)	2
Will Jerram (ENG)	1
Sefton Payne (ENG)	5
John Shilton (ENG)	4
Daryl Peach (ENG)	5
Jason Walton (ENG)	1
Peter McCullagh (ENG)	5
Frank Maskell (ENG)	5
Len Davies (ENG)	0
Graham Horne (SCO)	5
Jayson Morris (ENG)	2
Robert Dickson (ENG)	5
Jamie Rous (ENG)	2
Dean Venables (ENG)	1
Iwan Jones (WAL)	5
Roger Leighton (ENG)	5
David McLellan (SCO)	3
Wayne Rendle (ENG)	4
Michael Judge (IRE)	5
Nick Fruin (ENG)	1
Chris Hamson (ENG)	5
Marcus Campbell (SCO)	5
John Manley (ENG)	2
Jimmy Long (IRE)	5
Shawn Budd (AUS)	0
Robert Chapman (ENG)	1
Allison Fisher (ENG)	5
Mukesh Parmar (ENG)	1
Micky Roughan (IRE)	5
Stuart Parnell (ENG)	5
Jason Hawen (ENG)	1
Dylan Leary (NIR)	5
Kieran McMahon (NIR)	3
Dale Milton (ENG)	5
Paul McDonald (ENG)	4
Dermot McGlinchey (NIR)	1
Cary Kikis (ENG)	5
Vince McCluskey (ENG)	5
Paul Davison (ENG)	4
Carl Groves (ENG)	1
Steven Evans (ENG)	5
Graham MacDonald (ENG)	5
Ray van den Nouwland (AUS)	2
Paul Wykes (ENG)	4
Mark O'Sullivan (IRE)	5
Barry Bunn (ENG)	2
John Giles (ENG)	5
Richard Moore (ENG)	5
Sonic Multani (IND)	4
Peter Gilchrist (ENG)	0
Colin Kelly (ENG)	5
Darren Clarke (ENG)	5
Michael Gold (ENG)	4
Sean Lanigan (ENG)	4
John Knipe (ENG)	5
David Coles (ENG)	5
Darren Lennox (IRE)	4
Simon Morris (ENG)	5
Terrance Burke (ENG)	1
Karl Burrows (ENG)	5
Michael Huntingdon (ENG)	2
Craig Newson (ENG)	4
Norman Maher (WAL)	5
Jason Pegram (ENG)	5
Peter Bullen (BEL)	0
Stephen O'Connor (IRE)	5
Karl Townsend (ENG)	2
Peter Donegan (ENG)	5
David Singh (IND)	3

Sixth qualifying round Best of 9 frames
Brian Cassidy (ENG)	5
Chris Nicholson (ENG)	1
Nick Walker (ENG)	4
Carl Waters (ENG)	5
Kevin Ashby (ENG)	5
Craig Johnston-Allen (ENG)	4
Karl Broughton (ENG)	5
John Burns (ENG)	3
Bradley Jones (ENG)	4
Pat Horne (ENG)	5
David Grimwood (ENG)	5
Anthony O'Connor (IRE)	4
Bjorn L'Orange (NOR)	5
Jonathan Bagley (ENG)	0
Dave Gilbert (ENG)	5
Tom Finstad (CAN)	3
Sean Storey (ENG)	5
Mike Smith (ENG)	3
Shokat Ali (PAK)	2
Pete Seager (ENG)	5
Frank Dezi (ENG)	2
Micky Wareham (ENG)	5
Kieran McAlinden (NIR)	4
Spencer Dunn (ENG)	5
Robert Foxall (ENG)	5
Steve Russell (ENG)	4
John Dunning (ENG)	3
Surinder Gill (ENG)	5
Mike Watterson (ENG)	1
Nick Pearce (ENG)	5
Jimmy Michie (ENG)	1
Antony Bolsover (ENG)	5
Daniel Murphy (ENG)	2
Jason Wallace (ENG)	5
Steve Judd (ENG)	5
Paul Morgan (ENG)	2
Nic Barrow (ENG)	2
Mark Flowerdew (ENG)	5
Eddie Sinclair (SCO)	4
Darren Guest (ENG)	5
Joe Delaney (IRE)	5
Paul Hefford (ENG)	1
Fred Davis (ENG)	0
Mark King (ENG)	5
Oliver King (ENG)	5
Paul Dawkins (WAL)	2
Mark Boyd (ENG)	5
Ian Hurdman (ENG)	0
Tommy Murphy (NIR)	0
Dominic Dale (WAL)	5
Matt Gibson (SCO)	4
Robert Marshall (ENG)	5
Sam Chong (MYS)	0
Leigh Robinson (ENG)	5
Guy Dennis (ENG)	0
Ronnie O'Sullivan (ENG)	5
Mark Evans (ENG)	4
Steve Lemmens (BEL)	5
Fergal O'Brien (IRE)	5
John Timson (ENG)	4
Alan Peacock (ENG)	3
Sefton Payne (ENG)	5
Eddie Manning (ENG)	1
Daryl Peach (ENG)	5
Tony Rampello (ENG)	5
Peter McCullagh (ENG)	3
Paul Tanner (ENG)	5
Frank Maskell (ENG)	2
Steve Prest (ENG)	1
Graham Horne (SCO)	5
Mike Darrington (ENG)	5
Robert Dickson (ENG)	2
Colin Morton (ENG)	5
Iwan Jones (WAL)	0
Leigh Griffin (ENG)	2
Roger Leighton (ENG)	5
Alan Trigg (ENG)	5
Michael Judge (IRE)	2
Mick Fisher (ENG)	4
Chris Hamson (ENG)	5
David Rippon (ENG)	5
Marcus Campbell (SCO)	1
Sergio Beggiato (ENG)	5
Jimmy Long (IRE)	3
Craig MacGillivray (SCO)	5
Allison Fisher (ENG)	4
Jeff Cundy (ENG)	3
Micky Roughan (IRE)	5
Paul Webb (ENG)	5
Stuart Parnell (ENG)	3
Sean Lynskey (ENG)	4
Dylan Leary (NIR)	5
Stefan Mazrocis (ENG)	5
Dale Milton (ENG)	3
Jim Donnelly (SCO)	1
Cary Kikis (ENG)	5
John Spencer (ENG)	w/d
Vince McCluskey (ENG)	w/o
Derek Heaton (ENG)	3
Steven Evans (ENG)	5
Mark Pugh (ENG)	5
Graham MacDonald (ENG)	4
Pat Houlihan (ENG)	2
Mark O'Sullivan (IRE)	5
Simon Haggerty (SCO)	0
John Giles (ENG)	5
Adrian Rosa (ENG)	2
Richard Moore (ENG)	5
Jack Fitzmaurice (ENG)	2
Colin Kelly (ENG)	5
Gino Rigitano (CAN)	5
Darren Clarke (ENG)	2
Anthony Harris (ENG)	5
John Knipe (ENG)	1
Steve Meakin (ENG)	5
David Coles (ENG)	4
Paul Watchorn (IRE)	4
Simon Morris (ENG)	5
Gary Lees (ENG)	0
Karl Burrows (ENG)	5
Pat Kenny (ENG)	5
Norman Maher (WAL)	4
Terry Murphy (NIR)	5
Jason Pegram (ENG)	3
Dessie Sheehan (IRE)	0
Stephen O'Connor (IRE)	5
Paul Cavney (ENG)	2
Peter Donegan (ENG)	5

Seventh qualifying round Best of 9 frames
Jon Wright (ENG)	5
Brian Cassidy (ENG)	1
Mark Davis (ENG)	4
Carl Waters (ENG)	5
Euan Henderson (SCO)	5
Kevin Ashby (ENG)	4
Gary Natale (CAN)	w/d
Karl Broughton (ENG)	w/o
Paul McPhillips (SCO)	5
Pat Horne (ENG)	2
Chris Cookson (ENG)	3
David Grimwood (ENG)	5
Steve Campbell (ENG)	2
Bjorn L'Orange (NOR)	5
Craig Edwards (ENG)	4
Dave Gilbert (ENG)	5
Anthony Hamilton (ENG)	5
Sean Storey (ENG)	3
Dave Harold (ENG)	5
Pete Seager (ENG)	1
Bill Oliver (ENG)	5
Micky Wareham (ENG)	4
Mehmet Husnu (CYP)	2
Spencer Dunn (ENG)	5
Paul Gibson (ENG)	0
Robert Foxall (ENG)	5
Anthony Davies (WAL)	3
Surinder Gill (ENG)	5
Nick Dyson (ENG)	5
Nick Pearce (ENG)	1
Jim Chambers (ENG)	1
Antony Bolsover (ENG)	5
Murdo MacLeod (SCO)	5
Jason Wallace (ENG)	2
Alex Higgins (NIR)	5
Steve Judd (ENG)	1
Ray Edmonds (ENG)	0
Mark Flowerdew (ENG)	5
Martin Smith (ENG)	1
Darren Guest (ENG)	5
Karl Payne (ENG)	5
Joe Delaney (IRE)	2
Graham Cripsey (ENG)	0
Mark King (ENG)	5
Amrik Cheema (IND)	3
Oliver King (ENG)	5
Troy Shaw (ENG)	5
Mark Boyd (ENG)	0
Ian Brumby (ENG)	4
Dominic Dale (WAL)	5
Alex Borg (MLT)	5
Robert Marshall (ENG)	3
Robby Foldvari (AUS)	5
Leigh Robinson (ENG)	4
Chris Small (SCO)	1
Ronnie O'Sullivan (ENG)	5
Jason Weston (ENG)	3
Steve Lemmens (BEL)	5
Steve Longworth (ENG)	5
Fergal O'Brien (IRE)	4
Sefton Payne (ENG)	4
Ken Owers (ENG)	5
Drew Henry (SCO)	5
Daryl Peach (ENG)	2
Dave Martin (ENG)	1
Tony Rampello (ENG)	5
David Taylor (ENG)	4
Paul Tanner (ENG)	5
Nick Terry (ENG)	5
Graham Horne (SCO)	1
Jason Smith (ENG)	5
Mike Darrington (ENG)	2
Paul Medati (ENG)	4
Colin Morton (ENG)	5
Rex Williams (ENG)	4
Roger Leighton (ENG)	5
Joe Grech (MLT)	5
Alan Trigg (ENG)	1
Peter Lines (ENG)	5
Chris Hamson (ENG)	2
Marcel Gauvreau (CAN)	5
David Rippon (ENG)	1
Mark Rowing (ENG)	5
Sergio Beggiato (ENG)	3
Tony Wilson (IOM)	5
Craig MacGillivray (SCO)	4
Barry Pinches (ENG)	3
Micky Roughan (IRE)	5
Peter Daubney (ENG)	5
Paul Webb (ENG)	4
Joe O'Boye (IRE)	4
Dylan Leary (NIR)	5
Andy Hicks (ENG)	5
Stefan Mazrocis (ENG)	4
Bob Harris (ENG)	3
Cary Kikis (ENG)	5
David McDonnell (IRE)	5
Vince McCluskey (ENG)	1
Warren King (AUS)	5
Steven Evans (ENG)	1
Steve Duggan (ENG)	5
Mark Pugh (ENG)	1
Roger Bales (ENG)	3
Mark O'Sullivan (IRE)	5
Jamie Woodman (ENG)	2
John Giles (ENG)	5
Andrew Cairns (ENG)	5
Richard Moore (ENG)	3
Billy Snaddon (SCO)	5
Colin Kelly (ENG)	2
Brian Rowswell (ENG)	5
Gino Rigitano (CAN)	0
Tony Kearney (IRE)	2
Anthony Harris (ENG)	5
Stuart Reardon (ENG)	w/d
Steve Meakin (ENG)	w/o
Shaun Mellish (ENG)	5
Simon Morris (ENG)	2
Duncan Campbell (SCO)	3
Karl Burrows (ENG)	5
Jason Whittaker (ENG)	3
Pat Kenny (ENG)	5
Paddy Browne (IRE)	1
Terry Murphy (NIR)	5
Ian Williamson (ENG)	0
Stephen O'Connor (IRE)	5
John Rea (SCO)	5
Peter Donegan (ENG)	3

Note: w/o = walkover; w/d = withdrawn

=== Rounds 8–11 ===
Results for rounds 8 to 11 are shown below.

Eighth qualifying round Best of 19 frames
Jon Wright (ENG)	w/d
Carl Waters (ENG)	w/o
Euan Henderson (SCO)	8
Karl Broughton (ENG)	10
Paul McPhillips (SCO)	10
David Grimwood (ENG)	4
Bjorn L'Orange (NOR)	10
Dave Gilbert (ENG)	6
Anthony Hamilton (ENG)	7
Dave Harold (ENG)	10
Bill Oliver (ENG)	2
Spencer Dunn (ENG)	10
Robert Foxall (ENG)	10
Surinder Gill (ENG)	9
Nick Dyson (ENG)	10
Antony Bolsover (ENG)	7
Murdo MacLeod (SCO)	9
Alex Higgins (NIR)	10
Mark Flowerdew (ENG)	10
Darren Guest (ENG)	4
Karl Payne (ENG)	10
Mark King (ENG)	7
Oliver King (ENG)	10
Troy Shaw (ENG)	9
Dominic Dale (WAL)	10
Alex Borg (MLT)	4
Robby Foldvari (AUS)	4
Ronnie O'Sullivan (ENG)	10
Steve Lemmens (BEL)	6
Steve Longworth (ENG)	10
Ken Owers (ENG)	0
Drew Henry (SCO)	10
Tony Rampello (ENG)	5
Paul Tanner (ENG)	10
Nick Terry (ENG)	10
Jason Smith (ENG)	7
Colin Morton (ENG)	10
Roger Leighton (ENG)	9
Joe Grech (MLT)	10
Peter Lines (ENG)	7
Marcel Gauvreau (CAN)	4
Mark Rowing (ENG)	10
Tony Wilson (IOM)	10
Micky Roughan (IRE)	7
Peter Daubney (ENG)	9
Dylan Leary (NIR)	10
Andy Hicks (ENG)	10
Cary Kikis (ENG)	6
David McDonnell (IRE)	10
Warren King (AUS)	7
Steve Duggan (ENG)	10
Mark O'Sullivan (IRE)	7
John Giles (ENG)	10
Andrew Cairns (ENG)	2
Billy Snaddon (SCO)	6
Brian Rowswell (ENG)	10
Anthony Harris (ENG)	10
Steve Meakin (ENG)	6
Shaun Mellish (ENG)	10
Karl Burrows (ENG)	4
Pat Kenny (ENG)	10
Terry Murphy (NIR)	9
Stephen O'Connor (IRE)	10
John Rea (SCO)	5

Ninth qualifying round Best of 19 frames
Bob Chaperon (CAN)	10
Carl Waters (ENG)	2
Barry West (ENG)	5
Karl Broughton (ENG)	10
Eugene Hughes (IRE)	6
Paul McPhillips (SCO)	10
Les Dodd (ENG)	10
Bjorn L'Orange (NOR)	9
Franky Chan (HKG)	3
Dave Harold (ENG)	10
Colin Roscoe (WAL)	7
Spencer Dunn (ENG)	10
David Finbow (ENG)	10
Robert Foxall (ENG)	8
Brady Gollan (CAN)	10
Nick Dyson (ENG)	9
Kirk Stevens (CAN)	5
Alex Higgins (NIR)	10
Brian Morgan (ENG)	10
Mark Flowerdew (ENG)	8
Jason Prince (NIR)	9
Karl Payne (ENG)	10
Rod Lawler (ENG)	10
Oliver King (ENG)	1
Jim Wych (CAN)	8
Dominic Dale (WAL)	10
Paul Davies (WAL)	5
Ronnie O'Sullivan (ENG)	10
Peter Ebdon (ENG)	10
Steve Longworth (ENG)	3
Steve Newbury (WAL)	4
Drew Henry (SCO)	10
Cliff Wilson (WAL)	3
Paul Tanner (ENG)	10
Joe Swail (NIR)	10
Nick Terry (ENG)	8
Tony Chappel (WAL)	10
Colin Morton (ENG)	9
Stephen Murphy (IRE)	2
Joe Grech (MLT)	10
John Virgo (ENG)	7
Mark Rowing (ENG)	10
Jason Ferguson (ENG)	9
Tony Wilson (IOM)	10
Jack McLaughlin (NIR)	6
Dylan Leary (NIR)	10
Nigel Gilbert (ENG)	10
Andy Hicks (ENG)	9
John Read (ENG)	10
David McDonnell (IRE)	7
Jonathan Birch (ENG)	10
Steve Duggan (ENG)	5
Tony Meo (ENG)	9
John Giles (ENG)	10
John Campbell (AUS)	10
Brian Rowswell (ENG)	7
Wayne Jones (WAL)	10
Anthony Harris (ENG)	0
Ian Graham (ENG)	7
Shaun Mellish (ENG)	10
Mick Price (ENG)	6
Pat Kenny (ENG)	10
Cliff Thorburn (CAN)	7
Stephen O'Connor (IRE)	10

Tenth qualifying round Best of 19 frames
Bob Chaperon (CAN)	4
Karl Broughton (ENG)	10
Paul McPhillips (SCO)	9
Les Dodd (ENG)	10
Dave Harold (ENG)	7
Spencer Dunn (ENG)	10
David Finbow (ENG)	10
Brady Gollan (CAN)	6
Alex Higgins (NIR)	1
Brian Morgan (ENG)	10
Karl Payne (ENG)	10
Rod Lawler (ENG)	6
Dominic Dale (WAL)	5
Ronnie O'Sullivan (ENG)	10
Peter Ebdon (ENG)	10
Drew Henry (SCO)	9
Paul Tanner (ENG)	6
Joe Swail (NIR)	10
Tony Chappel (WAL)	10
Joe Grech (MLT)	6
Mark Rowing (ENG)	2
Tony Wilson (IOM)	10
Dylan Leary (NIR)	6
Nigel Gilbert (ENG)	10
John Read (ENG)	10
Jonathan Birch (ENG)	4
John Giles (ENG)	10
John Campbell (AUS)	3
Wayne Jones (WAL)	7
Shaun Mellish (ENG)	10
Pat Kenny (ENG)	5
Stephen O'Connor (IRE)	10

Eleventh qualifying round Best of 19 frames
Danny Fowler (ENG)	10
Karl Broughton (ENG)	0
Eddie Charlton (AUS)	w/d
Les Dodd (ENG)	w/o
Mark Bennett (WAL)	9
Spencer Dunn (ENG)	10
Dean Reynolds (ENG)	10
David Finbow (ENG)	8
Silvino Francisco (RSA)	6
Brian Morgan (ENG)	10
Joe Johnson (ENG)	6
Karl Payne (ENG)	10
Mark Johnston-Allen (ENG)	4
Ronnie O'Sullivan (ENG)	10
Dene O'Kane (NZL)	5
Peter Ebdon (ENG)	10
Mike Hallett (ENG)	7
Joe Swail (NIR)	10
Doug Mountjoy (WAL)	10
Tony Chappel (WAL)	2
Tony Drago (MLT)	10
Tony Wilson (IOM)	5
David Roe (ENG)	10
Nigel Gilbert (ENG)	4
Tony Jones (ENG)	10
John Read (ENG)	9
Tony Knowles (ENG)	6
John Giles (ENG)	10
Ken Doherty (IRE)	4
Shaun Mellish (ENG)	10
Peter Francisco (RSA)	6
Stephen O'Connor (IRE)	10

Note: w/o = walkover; w/d = withdrawn

== Century breaks ==
There were 35 century breaks in the championship, a new record, beating the 31 centuries of the 1991 edition. The highest break of the event was a 144 made by Steve Davis.

- 144 – Steve Davis
- 139, 122, 101 – Nigel Bond
- 138, 106 – Steve James
- 136, 129, 128, 126, 124, 123, 113, 110 – Stephen Hendry
- 133 – Terry Griffiths
- 124, 108, 100, 100 – Neal Foulds
- 122, 102 – John Parrott
- 121 – Martin Clark
- 112 – Alan McManus
- 110, 104, 104, 103 – James Wattana
- 108, 105, 104 – Jimmy White
- 108, 104 – Willie Thorne
- 105 – Peter Ebdon
- 104, 101 – Gary Wilkinson
