= 1993–94 snooker world rankings =

No. 1: Stephen Hendry
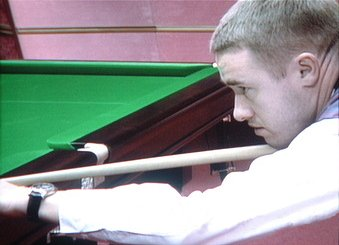

Personal information
- Born: January 13, 1969 (age 57)

Sport
- Country: Scotland
- Sport: Snooker
- Professional: 1985–2012, 2020–2024
- Highest ranking: 1

Preceded by 1992–93	1993–94	Succeeded by 1994–95

The world rankings for professional snooker players in the 1993‍–‍94 season are listed below.

Stephen Hendry, who had just won the World Snooker Championship for the third time in four years, retained top spot in the rankings. The rest of the top four was unchanged from the previous season: John Parrott stayed at second Jimmy White, runner-up in the world final, remained third, and Steve Davis stayed fourth.

Ronnie O'Sullivan was the highest-placed player in his first season as a professional, entering the list at 57th. Allison Fisher was the highest-ranked woman on the list, at 234th.

No. 2: John Parrott
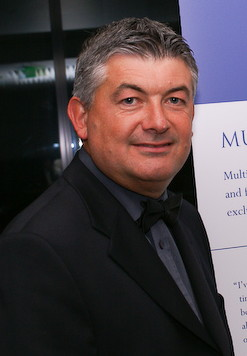

Personal information
- Born: May 11, 1964 (age 62)

Sport
- Country: England
- Sport: Snooker
- Professional: 1983–2010
- Highest ranking: 2

No. 3: Jimmy White
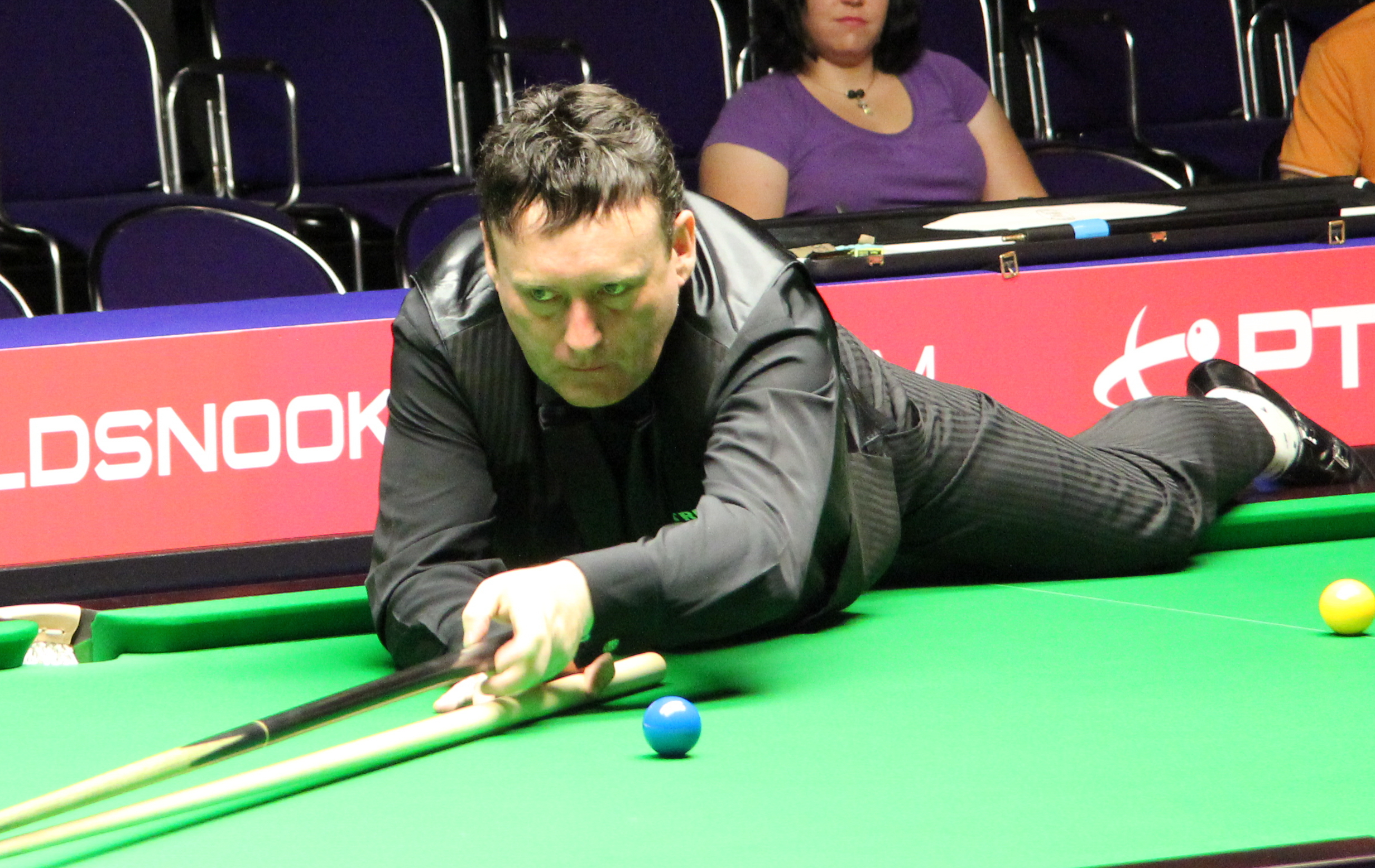

Personal information
- Born: May 2, 1962 (age 64)

Sport
- Country: England
- Sport: Snooker
- Professional: 1980–present
- Highest ranking: 2

1993–94 snooker world rankings
Rank	Previous	Change	Name	Points
1	(1)	0	Stephen Hendry (SCO)	50,050.000
2	(2)	0	John Parrott (ENG)	44,200.000
3	(3)	0	Jimmy White (ENG)	44,050.000
4	(4)	0	Steve Davis (ENG)	43,700.000
5	(7)	+2	James Wattana (THA)	41,450.000
6	(13)	+7	Alan McManus (SCO)	40,400.000
7	(15)	+8	Willie Thorne (ENG)	35,600.000
8	(6)	−2	Terry Griffiths (WAL)	35,200.000
9	(9)	0	Nigel Bond (ENG)	35,130.000
10	(16)	+6	Darren Morgan (WAL)	34,600.000 (Note: Pot Black gives 34,600.000 points; Snooker Scene gives 34,500.)
11	(21)	+10	Ken Doherty (IRL)	33,220.000
12	(12)	0	Martin Clark (ENG)	32,960.000
13	(10)	−3	Steve James (WAL)	30,550.000
14	(5)	−9	Neal Foulds (ENG)	30,020.000
15	(11)	−4	Dennis Taylor (NIR)	29,100.000
16	(32)	+16	David Roe (ENG)	29,080.000
17	(8)	−9	Gary Wilkinson (ENG)	28,260.000
18	(14)	−4	Alain Robidoux (CAN)	27,320.000
19	(17)	−2	Mike Hallett (ENG)	27,100.000
20	(24)	+4	Tony Drago (MLT)	26,850.000
21	(47)	+26	Peter Ebdon (ENG)	26,805.625
22	(18)	−4	Dene O'Kane (NZL)	26,170.000
23	(20)	−3	Tony Knowles (ENG)	25,940.000
24	(27)	+3	Mark Bennett (WAL)	25,830.000
25	(53)	+28	Joe Swail (NIR)	24,942.500
26	(23)	−3	Joe Johnson (ENG)	24,330.000
27	(35)	+8	Mick Price (ENG)	24,220.000
28	(19)	−9	Dean Reynolds (ENG)	24,150.000
29	(22)	−7	Tony Jones (ENG)	23,160.000
30	(26)	−4	Doug Mountjoy (WAL)	22,960.000
31	(31)	0	Mark Johnston-Allen (ENG)	22,950.000
32	(62)	+30	Jason Ferguson (ENG)	22,225.000
33	(28)	−5	Silvino Francisco (RSA)	22,010.000
34	(29)	−5	Eddie Charlton (AUS)	21,290.000
35	(30)	−5	Danny Fowler (ENG)	20,580.000
36	(48)	+12	Paul Davies (WAL)	19,376.250
37	(61)	+24	Brian Morgan (ENG)	19,120.000
38	(25)	−13	Peter Francisco (RSA)	18,850.000
39	(40)	+1	Bob Chaperon (CAN)	18,750.000
40	(43)	+3	Jim Wych (CAN)	18,600.000
41	(36)	−5	Cliff Thorburn (CAN)	18,000.000
42	(41)	−1	Jason Prince (NIR)	17,790.000
43	(34)	−9	Wayne Jones (WAL)	17,750.000
44	(44)	0	Jon Birch (ENG)	17,620.000
45	(45)	0	Rod Lawler (ENG)	17,430.000
46	(58)	+12	Les Dodd (ENG)	17,420.000
47	(33)	−14	Cliff Wilson (WAL)	16,790.000
48	(52)	+4	Tony Chappel (WAL)	16,650.000
49	(85)	+36	Anthony Hamilton (ENG)	16,367.500
50	(93)	+43	Dave Harold (ENG)	16,016.875
51	(38)	−13	Tony Meo (ENG)	15,790.000
52	(50)	−2	Nigel Gilbert (ENG)	15,520.000
53	(71)	+18	Nick Terry (ENG)	15,440.000
54	(70)	+16	Andy Hicks (ENG)	15,236.875
55	(46)	−9	Ian Graham (ENG)	14,820.000
56	(37)	−19	Steve Newbury (WAL)	14,730.000
57	(—)	—	Ronnie O'Sullivan (ENG)	14,720.000
58	(54)	−4	Jack McLaughlin (NIR)	14,610.000
59	(74)	+15	Billy Snaddon (SCO)	14,427.500
60	(—)	—	Stephen Murphy (IRE)	14,380.000
61	(72)	+11	Alex Higgins (NIR)	14,220.000
62	(55)	−7	Eugene Hughes (IRL)	14,180.000
63	(63)	0	David Finbow (ENG)	14,067.500
64	(87)	+23	Drew Henry (SCO)	13,780.000
65	(60)	−5	John Campbell (AUS)	13,730.000
66	(57)	−9	Barry West (ENG)	13,420.000
67	(104)	+37	David Taylor (ENG)	13,375.000
68	(39)	−29	Brady Gollan (CAN)	13,300.000
69	(59)	−10	Kirk Stevens (CAN)	13,100.000
70	(67)	−3	Warren King (AUS)	13,000.000
71	(76)	+5	Andrew Cairns (ENG)	12,970.000
72	(49)	−23	John Virgo (ENG)	12,900.000
73	(105)	+32	Mark Rowing (ENG)	12,300.000
74	(91)	+17	Paul McPhillips (SCO)	12,078.750
75	(68)	−7	Nick Dyson (ENG)	11,755.000
76	(51)	−25	Colin Roscoe (WAL)	11,610.000
77	(121)	+44	Troy Shaw (ENG)	11,006.875
78	(64)	−14	John Read (ENG)	10,935.000
79	(42)	−37	Franky Chan (HKG)	10,900.000
80	(106)	+26	Tony Wilson (IOM)	10,735.000
81	(135)	+54	Paul Tanner (ENG)	10,638.750
82	(65)	−17	Steve Campbell (ENG)	10,635.000
83	(141)	+58	Karl Broughton (ENG)	10,537.500
84	(81)	−3	Robby Foldvari (AUS)	10,485.000
85	(120)	+35	Shaun Mellish (ENG)	10,430.000
86	(83)	−3	Brian Rowswell (ENG)	10,290.000
87	(107)	+20	Joe Grech (MLT)	10,270.000
88	(122)	+34	Paul Gibson (ENG)	10,235.000
89	(80)	−9	Craig Edwards (ENG)	9,955.000
90	(94)	+4	Anthony Davies (WAL)	9,864.375
91	(119)	+28	Mark Davis (ENG)	9,741.250
92	(109)	+17	Jon Wright (ENG)	9,575.000
93	(77)	−16	Robert Marshall (ENG)	9,465.000
94	(118)	+24	Karl Payne (ENG)	9,437.500
95	(108)	+13	Bill Oliver (ENG)	9,430.000
96	(84)	−12	Steve Duggan (ENG)	9,400.000
97	(92)	−5	Peter Daubney (ENG)	9,217.500
98	(75)	−23	Chris Small (SCO)	8,940.000
99	(79)	−20	Ken Owers (ENG)	8,910.000
100	(192)	+92	Fergal O'Brien (IRL)	8,905.625
101	(—)	—	Steve Lee (ENG)	8,805.000
102	(156)	+54	Anthony Harris (ENG)	8,755.000
103	(100)	−3	Murdo Macleod (SCO)	8,685.000
104	(66)	−38	Jim Chambers (ENG)	8,675.000
105	(96)	−9	David McDonnell (IRL)	8,417.500
106	(110)	+4	Jason Smith (ENG)	8,370.000
107	(128)	+21	Euan Henderson (SCO)	8,301.250
108	(112)	+4	Paddy Browne (IRL)	8,215.000
109	(103)	−6	Barry Pinches (ENG)	8,150.000
110	(143)	+33	Shokat Ali (PAK)	7,920.000
111	(73)	−38	Peter Lines (ENG)	7,913.750
112	(144)	+32	Stefan Mazrocis (ENG)	7,845.000
113	(89)	−24	Jamie Woodman (ENG)	7,776.250
114	(272)	+158	Stephen O'Connor (IRL)	7,736.250
115	(123)	+8	Steve Longworth (ENG)	7,605.000
116	(115)	−1	Paul Medati (ENG)	7,550.000
117	(82)	−35	Jason Whittaker (ENG)	7,535.000
118	(98)	−20	Jason Weston (ENG)	7,374.375
119	(—)	—	Mark Williams (WAL)	7,276.000
120	(101)	−19	Joe O'Boye (IRL)	7,010.000
121	(127)	+6	Ian Brumby (ENG)	6,910.000
122	(—)	—	John Higgins (SCO)	6,900.000
123	(69)	−54	Rex Williams (ENG)	6,875.000
124	(99)	−25	Bob Harris (ENG)	6,750.000
125	(90)	−35	Dave Martin (ENG)	6,685.000
126	(132)	+6	Jimmy Michie (ENG)	6,491.250
127	(178)	+51	Pat Kenny (ENG)	6,296.250
128	(124)	−4	John Rea (SCO)	6,275.000
129	(151)	+22	Steve Meakin (ENG)	6,245.000
130	(202)	+72	Sean Lanigan (ENG)	6,156.875
131	(161)	+30	Steve Judd (ENG)	6,096.250
132	(147)	+15	Sean Storey (ENG)	5,975.625
133	(97)	−36	Mehmet Husnu (CYP)	5,651.875
134	(111)	−23	Ray Edmonds (ENG)	5,625.000
135	(134)	−1	Colin Morton (ENG)	5,492.500
136	(95)	−41	Amrik Cheema (IND)	5,481.875
137	(217)	+80	Nick Fruin (ENG)	5,456.250
138	(133)	−5	Terry Murphy (NIR)	5,393.750
139	(88)	−51	Stuart Reardon (ENG)	5,366.250
140	(255)	+115	Dylan Leary (NIR)	5,324.375
141	(138)	−3	Bradley Jones (ENG)	5,302.500
142	(148)	+6	Jeff Cundy (ENG)	5,263.750
143	(205)	+62	Darren Clarke (ENG)	5,217.500
144	(243)	+99	Jason Wallace (ENG)	5,195.000
145	(139)	−6	Craig MacGillivray (SCO)	5,098.750
146	(—)	—	John Giles (ENG)	4,995.000
147	(522)	+375	Scott MacFarlane (SCO)	4,880.000
148	(129)	−19	Tony Kearney (IRL)	4,775.000
149	(136)	−13	Gary Lees (ENG)	4,720.000
150	(185)	+35	Oliver King (ENG)	4,643.750
151	(174)	+23	Robert Foxall (ENG)	4,532.500
152	(200)	+48	Alan Trigg (ENG)	4,363.750
153	(113)	−40	Chris Cookson (ENG)	4,355.000
154	(196)	+42	Mark Pugh (ENG)	4,342.500
155	(102)	−53	Gary Natale (CAN)	4,300.000
156	(172)	+16	Mark Boyd (ENG)	4,270.000
157	(207)	+50	Graham Horne (SCO)	4,270.000
158	(78)	−80	Duncan Campbell (SCO)	4,225.000
159	(168)	+9	Bjorn L'Orange (NOR)	4,193.750
160	(182)	+22	Tony Rampello (ENG)	3,983.750
161	(159)	−2	Matt Gibson (SCO)	3,980.000
162	(162)	0	Kevin Ashby (ENG)	3,972.500
163	(211)	+48	Darryn Walker (ENG)	3,912.500
164	(—)	—	Dominic Dale (WAL)	3,886.000
165	(125)	−40	Ian Williamson (ENG)	3,845.000
166	(225)	+59	Mark Flowerdew (ENG)	3,800.625
167	(170)	+3	Paul Cavney (ENG)	3,792.500
168	(154)	−14	Dave Gilbert (ENG)	3,760.000
169	(209)	+40	Mark King (ENG)	3,753.125
170	(234)	+64	Steve Lemmens (BEL)	3,685.625
171	(169)	−2	Guy Dennis (ENG)	3,685.000
172	(286)	+114	David McLellan (SCO)	3,684.375
173	(—)	—	Spencer Dunn (ENG)	3,680.000
174	(242)	+68	Barry Bunn (ENG)	3,673.750
175	(171)	−4	Frank Dezi (ENG)	3,634.375
176	(184)	+8	Adrian Rosa (ENG)	3,581.250
177	(260)	+83	Darren Hackeson (ENG)	3,568.125
178	(203)	+25	Karl Burrows (ENG)	3,538.750
179	(149)	−30	Steve Prest (ENG)	3,538.750
180	(223)	+43	Wayne Rendle (ENG)	3,536.250
181	(137)	−44	Joe Delaney (IRL)	3,532.500
182	(198)	+16	Brian Cassidy (ENG)	3,387.500
183	(177)	−6	Leigh Griffin (ENG)	3,382.500
184	(212)	+28	Anthony O'Connor (IRL)	3,369.375
185	(173)	−12	Nick Walker (ENG)	3,360.000
186	(245)	+59	Marcus Campbell (SCO)	3,345.000
187	(175)	−12	David Rippon (ENG)	3,331.875
188	(—)	—	Yasin Merchant (IND)	3,301.000
189	(227)	+38	Dermot McGlinchey (NIR)	3,260.625
190	(117)	−73	Mario Morra (CAN)	3,250.000
191	(131)	−60	Mick Fisher (ENG)	3,145.000
192	(204)	+12	Peter Donegan (IRL)	3,126.875
193	(241)	+48	Alex Borg (MLT)	3,112.500
194	(126)	−68	Graham Cripsey (ENG)	3,105.000
195	(236)	+41	Graham MacDonald (ENG)	3,048.750
196	(142)	−54	Sean Lynskey (ENG)	2,991.875
197	(283)	+86	Cary Kikis (ENG)	2,961.875
198	(176)	−22	David Grimwood (ENG)	2,915.625
199	(197)	−2	Alan Peacock (ENG)	2,912.500
200	(210)	+10	Steve Mifsud (AUS)	2,886.875
201	(180)	−21	Danny Murphy (ENG)	2,828.750
202	(261)	+59	Simon Morris (ENG)	2,715.000
203	(235)	+32	Paul Wykes (ENG)	2,678.750
204	(130)	−74	Malcolm Bradley (ENG)	2,650.000
205	(191)	−14	Jim Donnelly (SCO)	2,645.000
206	(183)	−23	Sergio Beggiato (ENG)	2,643.125
207	(265)	+58	Surinder Gill (ENG)	2,632.500
208	(201)	−7	Eddie Manning (ENG)	2,631.250
209	(289)	+80	Antony Bolsover (ENG)	2,570.625
210	(301)	+91	Daniel Smith (ENG)	2,545.000
211	(179)	−32	Nic Barrow (ENG)	2,528.750
212	(181)	−31	Paul Webb (ENG)	2,506.875
213	(256)	+43	Jimmy Long (IRL)	2,458.125
214	(145)	−69	Sam Chong (MAS)	2,438.125
215	(—)	—	Carl Waters (ENG)	2,424.000
216	(216)	0	Steve Russell (ENG)	2,419.375
217	(208)	−9	Jason Pegram (ENG)	2,370.625
218	(—)	—	Roger Garrett (ENG)	2,350.000
219	(215)	−4	Leigh Robinson (ENG)	2,323.125
220	(157)	−63	Eddie Sinclair (SCO)	2,310.000
221	(—)	—	Jamie Burnett (SCO)	2,290.000
222	(251)	+29	Darren Guest (ENG)	2,250.000
223	(—)	—	Suriya Suwannasingh (THA)	2,238.000
224	(167)	−57	Dessie Sheehan (IRL)	2,207.500
225	(280)	+55	Richard Pincott (ENG)	2,178.125
226	(—)	—	Chris Scanlon (ENG)	2,158.000
227	(244)	+17	Simon Parker (ENG)	2,087.500
228	(150)	−78	Tommy Murphy (NIR)	2,085.000
229	(540)	+311	Ian Sargeant (WAL)	2,062.000
230	(316)	+86	Pat Horne (ENG)	2,024.375
231	(206)	−25	Steve Ventham (ENG)	2,024.375
232	(160)	−72	Mike Darrington (ENG)	2,010.000
233	(254)	+21	David Coles (ENG)	1,990.625
234	(353)	+119	Allison Fisher (ENG)	1,963.125
235	(229)	−6	Lee Grant (ENG)	1,957.500
236	(233)	−3	John Shilton (ENG)	1,882.500
237	(146)	−91	Mark Evans (ENG)	1,858.750
238	(267)	+29	Paul Morgan (ENG)	1,833.125
239	(—)	—	Nick Pearce (ENG)	1,739.000
240	(—)	—	Sonic Multani (IND)	1,730.000
241	(337)	+96	Colin Kelly (ENG)	1,715.000
242	(284)	+42	Lee Richardson (ENG)	1,658.750
243	(246)	+3	Tom Finstad (CAN)	1,641.875
244	(226)	−18	Roger Leighton (ENG)	1,640.625
245	(—)	—	Jonathan Saunders (ENG)	1,624.000
246	(313)	+67	Steve Elliott (ENG)	1,612.500
247	(237)	−10	Frank Maskell (ENG)	1,607.500
248	(271)	+23	Craig Newson (ENG)	1,602.500
249	(422)	+173	Michael Valentine (SCO)	1,596.875
250	(—)	—	Neil Tomkins (WAL)	1,593.000
251	(248)	−3	Will Jerram (ENG)	1,582.500
252	(166)	−86	Jack Fitzmaurice (ENG)	1,570.000
253	(—)	—	Mark Gray (ENG)	1,555.000
254	(220)	−34	Richard Moore (ENG)	1,490.625
255	(152)	−103	Graham Miles (ENG)	1,475.000
256	(288)	+32	Michael Gold (ENG)	1,431.250
257	(266)	+9	John Burns (ENG)	1,419.375
258	(221)	−37	Mukesh Parmar (ENG)	1,370.000
259	(190)	−69	Fred Davis (ENG)	1,360.000
260	(199)	−61	Simon Haggerty (SCO)	1,350.625
261	(358)	+97	Micky Roughan (IRL)	1,341.875
262	(—)	—	Michael Judge (IRL)	1,338.000
263	(164)	−99	Paul Watchorn (IRL)	1,325.000
264	(287)	+23	Micky Wareham (ENG)	1,319.375
265	(365)	+100	Gary Peters (WAL)	1,317.500
266	(312)	+46	Daryl Peach (ENG)	1,301.875
267	(253)	−14	Peter Gilchrist (ENG)	1,283.125
268	(252)	−16	Dean Venables (ENG)	1,260.000
269	(298)	+29	Wayne Lloyd (WAL)	1,252.500
270	(163)	−107	John Dunning (ENG)	1,230.000
271	(194)	−77	Derek Heaton (ENG)	1,222.500
272	(292)	+20	Anton Bishop (ENG)	1,213.125
273	(380)	+107	John Lardner (SCO)	1,206.875
274	(247)	−27	Vince McCluskey (ENG)	1,201.875
275	(230)	−45	Kevin Young (ENG)	1,173.750
276	(258)	−18	Graham Fisken (ENG)	1,166.875
277	(291)	+14	Pete Seager (ENG)	1,158.125
278	(331)	+53	Nicky Lazarus (ENG)	1,148.125
279	(238)	−41	Bert Demarco (SCO)	1,147.500
280	(262)	−18	John Timson (ENG)	1,130.000
281	(—)	—	Jamie Bodle (ENG)	1,093.000
282	(320)	+38	Mick Dunn (ENG)	1,091.875
283	(—)	—	Paul S. Davison (ENG)	1,069.000
284	(158)	−126	George Scott (ENG)	1,035.000
285	(296)	+11	Garry Baldrey (ENG)	1,022.500
286	(263)	−23	Robert Tavagna (AUS)	1,016.875
287	(362)	+75	Karl Townsend (ENG)	985.625
288	(276)	−12	Stacey Hillyard (ENG)	985.625
289	(277)	−12	Jason Walton (ENG)	972.500
290	(213)	−77	Robert Chapman (ENG)	966.875
291	(352)	+61	Iwan Jones (WAL)	956.250
292	(311)	+19	Gabriel Burns (IRL)	955.000
293	(—)	—	Mark O'Sullivan (IRL)	941.000
294	(224)	−70	Stuart Parnell (ENG)	939.375
295	(396)	+101	Steve Harrison (ENG)	931.250
296	(333)	+37	Jonathan Bagley (ENG)	920.000
297	(155)	−142	John Spencer (ENG)	900.000
298	(228)	−70	David Langton (ENG)	898.125
299	(273)	−26	Stuart Swinburn (ENG)	893.750
300	(278)	−22	Julian Goodyear (ENG)	891.250
301	(—)	—	Stephen Roberts (ENG)	890.000
302	(310)	+8	David Rice (ENG)	880.000
303	(307)	+4	Michael Leach (ENG)	876.250
304	(—)	—	Paul Lawrence (ENG)	868.000
305	(275)	−30	Richy McDonald (SCO)	865.000
306	(—)	—	Nick Marsh (ENG)	864.000
307	(304)	−3	Jason Hawen (ENG)	854.375
308	(340)	+32	Mike Smith (ENG)	848.750
309	(293)	−16	Chris Nicholson (ENG)	846.875
310	(—)	—	David Buskin (ENG)	829.000
311	(355)	+44	Darren Lennox (IRL)	823.125
312	(314)	+2	John Manley (ENG)	804.375
313	(303)	−10	Anthony Buckley (ENG)	792.500
314	(351)	+37	Sukhbir Grewal (ENG)	776.250
315	(334)	+19	Peter McCullagh (ENG)	770.000
316	(319)	+3	Thomas McKenna (ENG)	755.000
317	(—)	—	David Blakey (ENG)	745.000
318	(347)	+29	Jamie Rous (ENG)	739.375
319	(339)	+20	Justin Buckingham (ENG)	736.875
320	(—)	—	Sefton Payne (ENG)	728.000
321	(325)	+4	Kevin Lownds (ENG)	725.625
322	(308)	−14	Louis Fazekas (CAN)	718.125
323	(259)	−64	Carl Groves (ENG)	713.750
324	(514)	+190	Andrew Hannah (ENG)	708.000
325	(361)	+36	Nick Jones (WAL)	700.625
326	(—)	—	Steven Evans (ENG)	696.000
327	(—)	—	Joe Perry (ENG)	692.000
328	(—)	—	Paul Davison (ENG)	688.000
329	(—)	—	David Wilson (ENG)	688.000
330	(415)	+85	Richard King (ENG)	683.125
331	(343)	+12	Alan Taylor (ENG) (Note: Snooker Scene has Alan Taylor and Chris Palmer (rank 332) in swapped order relative to Pot Black.)	682.500
332	(274)	−58	Chris Palmer (ENG)	682.500
333	(323)	−10	Paul Hefford (ENG)	675.625
334	(188)	−146	Billy Kelly (IRL)	675.000
335	(367)	+32	Philip Seaton (ENG)	674.375
336	(326)	−10	John Herbert (WAL)	672.500
337	(—)	—	Richard Culham (ENG)	662.000
338	(—)	—	Noppadon Noppachorn (THA)	656.000
339	(—)	—	Craig Harrison (ENG)	650.000
340	(349)	+9	David Singh (IND)	644.375
341	(305)	−36	Terrance Burke (ENG) (Note: Snooker Scene has Terrance Burke and David Singh (rank 340) in swapped order relative to Pot Black.)	644.375
342	(—)	—	Anthony Halpin (ENG)	635.000
343	(376)	+33	Steve Whalley (ENG)	635.000
344	(—)	—	John Rees (ENG)	634.375
345	(536)	+191	Brian Peddie (ENG)	618.000
346	(—)	—	Steve Archer (ENG)	614.000
347	(—)	—	Matthew Couch (ENG)	613.000
348	(368)	+20	Graham Stevens (ENG)	604.375
349	(318)	−31	George Wood (ENG)	595.000
350	(394)	+44	Richard McHugh (IRL)	591.250
351	(—)	—	John Knipe (ENG)	591.000
352	(297)	−55	Paul Maskell (ENG)	587.500
353	(249)	−104	John White (CAN)	584.375
354	(—)	—	James Vicarey (ENG)	583.000
355	(359)	+4	Aidan Murphy (IRL)	578.750
356	(—)	—	Ian Hurdman (ENG)	578.000
357	(329)	−28	Robert Harrhy (WAL)	574.375
358	(—)	—	Eddie Lott (ENG)	570.000
359	(—)	—	Paul Florence (ENG)	566.000
360	(309)	−51	John Leahy (IRL)	563.125
361	(—)	—	Gavin Burns (ENG)	556.000
362	(322)	−40	Norman Maher (WAL)	553.750
363	(299)	−64	Michael Huntingdon (ENG)	553.125
364	(294)	−70	Hassan Vaizie (ENG)	551.875
365	(327)	−38	Neil Selman (ENG)	549.375
366	(373)	+7	Steven Cook (ENG)	538.125
367	(—)	—	Mark Williams (ENG)	531.000
368	(330)	−38	Geet Sethi (IND)	528.125
369	(378)	+9	Hitesh Lakhani (ENG)	521.875
370	(—)	—	Stuart Pettman (ENG)	515.000
371	(371)	0	Stuart Mann (ENG)	511.250
372	(375)	+3	Karen Corr (NIR)	505.000
373	(—)	—	Darren Limburg (ENG)	498.000
374	(345)	−29	Philip Minchin (ENG)	497.500
375	(335)	−40	Norman MacLachlan (SCO)	495.000
376	(285)	−91	John Welsh (ENG)	487.500
377	(—)	—	David Stone (ENG)	483.000
378	(360)	−18	Gary Thomas (SCO)	470.625
379	(372)	−7	David Athorn (ENG)	468.125
380	(264)	−116	Bernard Bennett (ENG)	462.500
381	(317)	−64	Michael Kirkham (ENG)	448.125
382	(399)	+17	Lyndon Smith (ENG)	433.125
383	(364)	−19	Shane Haines (ENG)	427.500
384	(356)	−28	Gerry Jones (IRL)	425.000
385	(438)	+53	Roy Bigg (ENG)	424.875
386	(269)	−117	Brian Cakebread (ENG)	415.625
387	(344)	−43	Ann-Marie Farren (ENG)	407.500
388	(403)	+15	Kevin Brown (ENG)	405.000
389	(384)	−5	Stuart Pegrum (ENG)	403.750
390	(—)	—	Richard Cleeter (ENG)	398.000
391	(—)	—	Jayson Morris (ENG)	386.000
392	(328)	−64	David Lazenby (ENG)	379.375
393	(341)	−52	Tony Emmott (ENG)	378.750
394	(377)	−17	Richard Pipe (ENG)	375.000
395	(451)	+56	Andrew Photiou (ENG)	374.500
396	(397)	+1	Timothy Paling (ENG)	368.125
397	(332)	−65	Ralph Mason (ENG) (Note: Snooker Scene has Ralph Mason and Chris Henry (rank 398) in swapped order relative to Pot Black.)	358.125
398	(—)	—	Chris Henry (BEL)	358.000
399	(338)	−61	Paul McDonald (ENG)	356.875
400	(279)	−121	Matthew McGrotty (SCO)	356.250
401	(543)	+142	Stephen Taylor (ENG)	355.000
402	(424)	+22	Martin Grainger (ENG)	352.500
403	(—)	—	Scott Bigham (SCO)	350.000
404	(—)	—	Ian McCulloch (ENG)	348.000
405	(411)	+6	Derek Turner (ENG)	347.500
406	(342)	−64	John Clouden (ENG)	340.625
407	(402)	−5	John Dobson (WAL)	340.000
408	(—)	—	Martin Dziewialtowski (SCO)	338.000
409	(232)	−177	Dennis Hughes (ENG)	337.500
410	(—)	—	Jason Scott (ENG)	336.000
411	(336)	−75	Chris Carpenter (ENG)	325.000
412	(439)	+27	Elliott Clark (ENG)	322.875
413	(457)	+44	Chris Milner (ENG)	316.000
414	(324)	−90	Jerry Williams (ENG)	315.625
415	(363)	−52	Stan Haslam (ENG)	310.625
416	(383)	−33	Luke Spiller (ENG)	308.750
417	(387)	−30	Gregg Tugby (ENG)	308.750
418	(443)	+25	Andrew Alexandrou (ENG)	307.875
419	(393)	−26	Fjolnir Thorgeirsson (ISL)	306.250
420	(398)	−22	Jason Curtis (ENG)	303.125
421	(404)	−17	Peter Peratikou (ENG)	301.875
422	(389)	−33	Andrew Prydden (ENG)	300.625
423	(—)	—	Paul Smith (ENG)	299.000
424	(—)	—	Shawn Budd (AUS)	298.000
425	(—)	—	Lee Walters (ENG)	298.000
426	(381)	−45	Ian Barry Stark (ENG)	296.876
427	(370)	−57	Simon Westcott (ENG)	296.250
428	(412)	−16	Tim Dunphy (IRL)	294.375
429	(295)	−134	Stuart Henderson (ENG)	293.750
430	(—)	—	Peter Bullen (BEL)	289.000
431	(433)	+2	Michael Eaves (ENG)	288.125
432	(—)	—	Matthew Spade (ENG)	288.000
433	(—)	—	Ryan Milton (ENG)	277.000
434	(—)	—	John McBride (IRL)	269.000
435	(—)	—	Stephen Popplewell (ENG)	268.000
436	(—)	—	Mario Wehrmann (NED)	268.000
437	(—)	—	Alistair Fleming (SCO)	266.000
438	(—)	—	David Mole (ENG)	266.000
439	(302)	−137	Mark Elliott (ENG)	265.625
440	(—)	—	Mark Whatley (ENG)	265.000
441	(391)	−50	Jimmy O'Shea (ENG)	262.500
442	(306)	−136	Chris Barnett (ENG)	259.375
443	(—)	—	Michael O'Sullivan (ENG)	257.000
444	(423)	−21	Sacha Journet (ENG)	254.875
445	(—)	—	Paul Clarke (ENG)	253.000
446	(401)	−45	Frank Fitzgerald (ENG)	250.000
447	(—)	—	Alexander Ferguson (ENG)	248.000
448	(392)	−56	John Harrop (ENG)	247.500
449	(413)	−36	Robert Thallon (SCO)	246.250
450	(388)	−62	Chris Capel (ENG)	245.625
451	(350)	−101	Stuart Green (ENG)	239.375
452	(477)	+25	Ryan Michael (ENG)	239.250
453	(354)	−99	Marc Devon (ENG)	238.125
454	(417)	−37	Christopher Booth (ENG)	235.000
455	(—)	—	Wilson Dornan (SCO)	230.000
456	(—)	—	Alan Edmonds (ENG)	228.000
457	(—)	—	Joe Canny (IRL)	222.000
458	(—)	—	Gary Morris (ENG)	222.000
459	(—)	—	Darren Martin (ENG)	220.000
460	(416)	−44	Chris Achilles (ENG)	220.000
461	(—)	—	David Blagg (ENG)	218.000
462	(408)	−54	Peter Williams (WAL)	217.500
463	(476)	+13	Richard Davis (ENG)	217.250
464	(430)	−34	Paul Hurren (ENG)	214.250
465	(—)	—	Alfonso Bellusci (ENG)	214.000
466	(454)	−12	Trevor Holtby (ENG)	213.375
467	(519)	+52	Peter Kippie (CAN)	209.000
468	(374)	−94	Mark Faulkner (ENG)	208.125
469	(—)	—	Glenn Stevenson (ENG)	208.000
470	(435)	−35	Jimmy Tarke-Singh (ENG)	208.000
471	(—)	—	Grant Peabody (ENG)	207.000
472	(—)	—	Ramu Vaswani (ENG)	206.000
473	(—)	—	Ian Bullimore (ENG)	205.000
474	(419)	−55	Andrew Clark (ENG)	205.000
475	(407)	−68	Damon Zeid (ENG)	200.625
476	(—)	—	Len Davies (ENG)	194.000
477	(—)	—	Chris Wright (ENG)	192.000
478	(432)	−46	Nick Stanfield (ENG)	191.125
479	(—)	—	Kieran McMahon (NIR)	190.000
480	(444)	−36	Peter Bardsley (ENG)	188.750
481	(346)	−135	David Young (ENG)	187.500
482	(—)	—	Andrew Farrow (ENG)	187.000
483	(420)	−63	John Benton (IRL)	186.875
484	(—)	—	Simon Morfitt (ENG)	186.000
485	(—)	—	Brian Smits (NED)	184.000
486	(458)	−28	Alex Coutts (SCO)	184.000
487	(421)	−66	Paul Lovegrove (ENG)	176.875
488	(414)	−74	Mark Darnes (ENG)	171.250
489	(—)	—	Udesh Pillay (ENG)	171.000
490	(—)	—	David Mellon (ENG)	171.000
491	(—)	—	Brett Patmore (ENG)	170.000
492	(437)	−55	Dave Hoggarth (ENG)	165.000
493	(445)	−48	Mark Peevers (ENG)	162.750
494	(494)	0	Del Smith (ENG)	161.250
495	(465)	−30	Clive Bernstone (ENG)	159.625
496	(369)	−127	Jeff White (ENG)	159.375
497	(472)	−25	Barry O'Loughlin (IRL)	154.375
498	(386)	−112	Tony Pierucci (ENG)	153.750
499	(—)	—	James Gibson (ENG)	152.000
500	(—)	—	Gary Bampton (ENG)	149.000
501	(405)	−96	Rory McLeod (ENG)	148.750
502	(—)	—	Craig Barber (ENG)	144.000
503	(385)	−118	Johangir Khan (PAK)	143.750
504	(—)	—	Paul Davis (ENG)	143.000
505	(470)	−35	Kevin Johnstone (ENG)	142.500
506	(456)	−50	Peter Delaney (ENG)	142.125
507	(441)	−66	Chris Archer (ENG)	141.875
508	(448)	−60	Ahmed Hussein Gamal (EGY)	141.625
509	(—)	—	Richard Wheelhouse (ENG)	140.000
510	(—)	—	Stephen Kiddle (ENG)	138.000
511	(189)	−322	Mike Watterson (ENG)	135.000
512	(—)	—	Richard Batty (ENG)	135.000
513	(—)	—	Mike Russell (ENG)	135.000
514	(466)	−48	Luke Roberts (ENG)	134.625
515	(395)	−120	Mike Henson (GER)	131.000
516	(—)	—	Donald Newcombe (WAL)	124.000
517	(—)	—	Matthew Davies (ENG)	120.000
518	(—)	—	Craig McDonald (ENG)	116.000
519	(406)	−113	David Brabiner (JER)	115.625
520	(452)	−68	Alex Peart (JAM)	115.375
521	(—)	—	Malcolm Billaney (ENG)	115.000
522	(—)	—	Darren Dodd (ENG)	110.000
523	(—)	—	Neil Davies (ENG)	106.000
524	(—)	—	Andrea Barbacane (ITA)	105.000
525	(450)	−75	Barry Zee (SGP)	103.625
526	(—)	—	Martin Lee (ENG)	103.000
527	(—)	—	David Thompson (ENG)	102.000
528	(461)	−67	Ronnie Shakespeare (ENG)	101.875
529	(418)	−111	Peter Oakley (ENG)	100.000
530	(463)	−67	Navid Khan (ENG)	98.750
531	(—)	—	Mark Canovan (NZL)	96.000
532	(—)	—	Andrew Essilfie (ENG)	96.000
533	(—)	—	Iain Trimble (ENG)	96.000
534	(—)	—	Steven Gough (ENG)	94.000
535	(468)	−67	Colin Mitchell (ENG)	93.625
536	(—)	—	Philip Freeman (ENG)	90.000
537	(—)	—	Gary Skipworth (ENG)	89.000
538	(425)	−113	David Cheung (HKG)	87.500
539	(427)	−112	Phil Mumford (ENG)	87.500
540	(447)	−93	Tony Bolahood (CAN)	85.625
541	(469)	−72	Geoff Grennan (ENG)	85.500
542	(429)	−113	David Wright (ENG)	84.375
543	(—)	—	John Horsfall (CAN)	83.000
544	(—)	—	Andrew Fisher (ENG)	82.000
545	(—)	—	Jason Greaves (ENG)	81.000
546	(—)	—	Paul Moss (ENG)	80.000
547	(—)	—	Andrew Atkinson (ENG)	80.000
548	(436)	−112	Joe Baines (IRL)	75.000
549	(—)	—	Neil Hoggarth (ENG)	74.000
550	(440)	−110	John Jorgensen (CAN)	71.875
551	(—)	—	Huseyin Hursid (TUR)	69.000
552	(446)	−106	David Hamson (ENG)	65.625
553	(449)	−104	John Cahill (CAN)	65.625
554	(462)	−92	Clement Walden (ENG)	64.875
555	(471)	−84	Stephen Sanders (ENG)	64.375
556	(484)	−72	Gareth Esprit (ENG)	63.875
557	(—)	—	Mark Ganderton (ENG)	63.000
558	(—)	—	Shaun Berry (ENG)	62.000
559	(473)	−86	Ayub Khalifa (ENG)	60.375
560	(475)	−85	Russell Gough (ENG)	60.375
561	(453)	−108	Michael Burke (ENG)	59.375
562	(455)	−107	Graham Bradley (ENG)	56.250
563	(—)	—	Chris Gill (ENG)	50.000
564	(—)	—	Ismail Yildiran (ENG)	50.000
565	(459)	−106	Neville Atkins (ENG)	50.000
566	(474)	−92	Foizur Rahman (ENG)	49.375
567	(—)	—	Dean Bracey (ENG)	48.000
568	(—)	—	Gary Miller (ENG)	48.000
569	(480)	−89	Dave Andrew (ENG)	46.125
570	(—)	—	Charles Vos (CAN)	46.000
571	(479)	−92	Ian Gerrard (ENG)	44.125
572	(—)	—	Mike Watling (ENG)	44.000
573	(—)	—	Alan Brookes (ENG)	44.000
574	(464)	−110	Paul Strafford (ENG)	43.750
575	(467)	−108	David Giles (ENG)	40.625
576	(—)	—	Robert Clifforth (ENG)	40.000
577	(—)	—	Darren Skinner (ENG)	39.000
578	(—)	—	Tom Lee (ENG)	36.000
579	(488)	−91	Nicholas Segal (ENG)	30.500
580	(—)	—	Ross Mabbott (ENG)	30.000
581	(—)	—	Darren Collison (ENG)	30.000
582	(512)	−70	Frank Gumbrell (ENG)	30.000
583	(492)	−91	Don Watson (ENG)	27.375
584	(—)	—	Frank Smith (ENG)	25.000
585	(481)	−104	Andreas Ahmed (ENG)	25.000
586	(—)	—	Martin O'Neill (NIR)	24.000
587	(482)	−105	Neil Shaw (ENG)	21.875
588	(483)	−105	Russell Toombes (ENG)	21.875
589	(—)	—	Mark Congram (ENG)	20.000
590	(—)	—	Anthony Bridge (ENG)}	20.000
591	(485)	−106	John Mulready (IRL)	18.750
592	(486)	−106	Anup Amin (ENG)	15.625
593	(—)	—	Jason Rosenfeld (ENG)	15.000
594	(489)	−105	Declan Healy (ENG)	12.500
595	(490)	−105	Christopher Flight (ENG)	12.500
596	(491)	−105	Stephen Phillips (ENG)	12.500
597	(—)	—	Shilun Thakkar (ENG)	8.000
598	(495)	−103	Peter Cadogan (ENG)	3.125
