= 1993 Welsh Open (snooker) =

1993 Regal Welsh Open
Tournament information
- Dates: 21–31 January 1993
- Venue: Newport Leisure Centre
- City: Newport
- Country: Wales
- Organisation: WPBSA
- Format: Ranking event
- Total prize fund: £140,000
- Winner's share: £27,500
- Highest break: Alan McManus (SCO) (140)

Final
- Champion: Ken Doherty (IRL)
- Runner-up: Alan McManus (SCO)
- Score: 9–7

The 1993 Welsh Open (officially the 1993 Regal Welsh Open) was a professional ranking snooker tournament that took place between 21 and 31 January 1993 at the Newport Leisure Centre in Newport, Wales. Television coverage on BBC Wales started on 28 January.

Stephen Hendry, the defending champion, lost in the third round to Nigel Bond.

Ken Doherty defeated Alan McManus 9–7 in the final to win his first ranking title.

== Main draw ==
Last 64; Best of 9 frames
(Republic of Ireland) Ken Doherty	5
(Wales) Tony Chappel	2
(England) Steve James	5
(England) Barry West	1
(England) Gary Wilkinson	5
(England) Shaun Mellish	3
(England) David Roe	5
(England) Barry Bunn	2
(England) John Parrott	5
(England) Jason Weston	1
(Belgium) Steve Lemmens	5
(Wales) Mark Bennett	4
(England) Willie Thorne	5
(Republic of Ireland) Stephen O'Connor	2
(Canada) Jim Wych	5
(England) Dean Reynolds	1
(Thailand) James Wattana	5
(England) Jimmy Michie	2
(Cyprus) Mehmet Husnu	5
(England) Danny Fowler	3
(Canada) Alain Robidoux	5
(England) Dave Finbow	4
(South Africa) Silvino Francisco	5
(England) Stefan Mazrocis	1
(England) Jimmy White	5
(Wales) Paul Davies	4
(New Zealand) Dene O'Kane	5
(Scotland) David McLellan	2
(England) Tony Knowles	5
(Scotland) Paul McPhillips	4
(Scotland) Scott MacFarlane	5
(Wales) Darren Morgan	3
(Scotland) Alan McManus	5
(England) David Taylor	0
(Scotland) Billy Snaddon	5
(England) Mark Johnston-Allen	2
(England) Neal Foulds	5
(Northern Ireland) Jack McLaughlin	3
(England) Ronnie O'Sullivan	5
(Australia) Eddie Charlton	1
(England) Nigel Bond	5
(England) Michael Stocks	4
(Wales) Doug Mountjoy	5
(Scotland) Drew Henry	4
(Scotland) Stephen Hendry	5
(England) Steve Judd	0
(England) Tony Jones	5
(Canada) Brady Gollan	4
(Northern Ireland) Joe Swail	5
(South Africa) Peter Francisco	4
(England) Martin Clark	5
(Canada) Bob Chaperon	1
(England) Steve Davis	5
(Australia) John Campbell	0
(Malta) Joe Grech	5
(England) Joe Johnson	3
(England) Mike Hallett	5
(Pakistan) Shokat Ali	1
(Wales) Terry Griffiths	5
(England) Peter Ebdon	2
(Malta) Tony Drago	5
(Wales) Wayne Jones	3
(England) Karl Broughton	5
(Northern Ireland) Dennis Taylor	2

Last 32; Best of 9 frames
(Republic of Ireland) Ken Doherty	5
(England) Steve James	4
(England) Gary Wilkinson	5
(England) David Roe	4
(England) John Parrott	5
(Belgium) Steve Lemmens	2
(England) Willie Thorne	5
(Canada) Jim Wych	0
(Thailand) James Wattana	5
(Cyprus) Mehmet Husnu	1
(Canada) Alain Robidoux	5
(South Africa) Silvino Francisco	1
(England) Jimmy White	5
(New Zealand) Dene O'Kane	2
(England) Tony Knowles	5
(Scotland) Scott MacFarlane	3
(Scotland) Alan McManus	5
(Scotland) Billy Snaddon	0
(England) Neal Foulds	5
(England) Ronnie O'Sullivan	0
(England) Nigel Bond	5
(Wales) Doug Mountjoy	2
(Scotland) Stephen Hendry	5
(England) Tony Jones	4
(Northern Ireland) Joe Swail	5
(England) Martin Clark	4
(England) Steve Davis	5
(Malta) Joe Grech	0
(England) Mike Hallett	5
(Wales) Terry Griffiths	0
(Malta) Tony Drago	5
(England) Karl Broughton	1

Last 16; Best of 9 frames
(Republic of Ireland) Ken Doherty	5
(England) Gary Wilkinson	3
(England) John Parrott	5
(England) Willie Thorne	2
(Thailand) James Wattana	5
(Canada) Alain Robidoux	1
(England) Jimmy White	5
(England) Tony Knowles	1
(Scotland) Alan McManus	5
(England) Neal Foulds	2
(England) Nigel Bond	5
(Scotland) Stephen Hendry	3
(Northern Ireland) Joe Swail	5
(England) Steve Davis	3
(England) Mike Hallett	5
(Malta) Tony Drago	2

Quarter-finals; Best of 9 frames
(Republic of Ireland) Ken Doherty	5
(England) John Parrott	1
(Thailand) James Wattana	5
(England) Jimmy White	2
(Scotland) Alan McManus	5
(England) Nigel Bond	2
(Northern Ireland) Joe Swail	5
(England) Mike Hallett	2

Semi-finals; Best of 11 frames
(Republic of Ireland) Ken Doherty	6
(Thailand) James Wattana	2
(Scotland) Alan McManus	6
(Northern Ireland) Joe Swail	2

Final; Best of 17 frames
(Republic of Ireland) Ken Doherty	9
(Scotland) Alan McManus	7
