= 1996 Welsh Open (snooker) =

1996 Regal Welsh Open
Tournament information
- Dates: 27 January – 3 February 1996
- Venue: Newport Leisure Centre
- City: Newport
- Country: Wales
- Organisation: WPBSA
- Format: Ranking event
- Total prize fund: £205,000
- Winner's share: £36,000
- Highest break: Darren Morgan (WAL) (143)

Final
- Champion: Mark Williams (WAL)
- Runner-up: John Parrott (ENG)
- Score: 9–3

The 1996 Welsh Open (officially the 1996 Regal Welsh Open) was a professional ranking snooker tournament that took place between 27 January–3 February 1996 at the Newport Leisure Centre in Newport, Wales.

Steve Davis was the defending champion, but lost in the third round to Drew Henry.

Mark Williams defeated John Parrott 9–3 in the final to win his first ranking title.

== Main draw ==
Last 64; Best of 9 frames
1	(Scotland) Stephen Hendry	5
34	(England) Mike Hallett	1
60	(Wales) Steve Newbury	5
21	(England) Mick Price	2
80	(England) Karl Payne	5
29	(England) Jason Ferguson	3
13	(England) Dave Harold	5
43	(England) Tony Jones	3
15	(Wales) Terry Griffiths	5
247	(Wales) Darren Lennox	3
53	(Wales) Tony Chappel	5
17	(England) Andy Hicks	3
123	(England) Stuart Pettman	5
19	(Northern Ireland) Joe Swail	4
8	(Wales) Darren Morgan	5
122	(England) Oliver King	2
61	(Northern Ireland) Terry Murphy	5
5	(Thailand) James Wattana	4
23	(England) Gary Wilkinson	5
87	(England) Chris Scanlon	3
39	(Wales) Mark Williams	5
25	(England) Willie Thorne	1
9	(Republic of Ireland) Ken Doherty	5
236	(Wales) Matthew Stevens	4
10	(England) Peter Ebdon	5
151	(Scotland) Craig MacGillivray	2
31	(England) Anthony Hamilton	5
63	(England) Jonathan Birch	3
33	(Scotland) Billy Snaddon	5
20	(Canada) Alain Robidoux	3
3	(England) Ronnie O'Sullivan	5
107	(India) Yasin Merchant	1
4	(England) John Parrott	5
46	(England) Nick Terry	4
93	(Malta) Joe Grech	5
30	(England) Dean Reynolds	1
32	(Northern Ireland) Dennis Taylor	5
142	(England) Paul Wykes	1
38	(Republic of Ireland) Fergal O'Brien	5
16	(England) David Roe	4
11	(Scotland) John Higgins	5
54	(England) Mark Flowerdew	2
57	(Wales) Wayne Jones	5
26	(England) Steve James	2
190	(Scotland) Graeme Dott	5
18	(New Zealand) Dene O'Kane	2
6	(Scotland) Alan McManus	5
40	(England) Rod Lawler	4
7	(England) Jimmy White	5
49	(England) Mark Johnston-Allen	3
62	(Scotland) Chris Small	5
27	(England) Brian Morgan	0
28	(England) Neal Foulds	5
45	(Wales) Anthony Davies	4
(England) Paul Hunter	5
12	(England) Nigel Bond	1
35	(Scotland) Drew Henry	5
14	(Malta) Tony Drago	4
133	(England) John Giles	5
22	(England) Martin Clark	3
110	(Northern Ireland) Gerard Greene	5
24	(England) Tony Knowles	0
2	(England) Steve Davis	5
79	(Wales) Dominic Dale	2

Last 32; Best of 9 frames
1	(Scotland) Stephen Hendry	5
60	(Wales) Steve Newbury	2
80	(England) Karl Payne	4
13	(England) Dave Harold	5
15	(Wales) Terry Griffiths	2
53	(Wales) Tony Chappel	5
123	(England) Stuart Pettman	2
8	(Wales) Darren Morgan	5
61	(Northern Ireland) Terry Murphy	5
23	(England) Gary Wilkinson	3
39	(Wales) Mark Williams	5
9	(Republic of Ireland) Ken Doherty	3
10	(England) Peter Ebdon	5
31	(England) Anthony Hamilton	3
33	(Scotland) Billy Snaddon	5
3	(England) Ronnie O'Sullivan	4
4	(England) John Parrott	5
93	(Malta) Joe Grech	0
32	(Northern Ireland) Dennis Taylor	5
38	(Republic of Ireland) Fergal O'Brien	4
11	(Scotland) John Higgins	5
57	(Wales) Wayne Jones	3
190	(Scotland) Graeme Dott	5
6	(Scotland) Alan McManus	4
7	(England) Jimmy White	4
62	(Scotland) Chris Small	5
28	(England) Neal Foulds	2
(England) Paul Hunter	5
35	(Scotland) Drew Henry	5
133	(England) John Giles	0
110	(Northern Ireland) Gerard Greene	4
2	(England) Steve Davis	5

Last 16; Best of 9 frames
1	(Scotland) Stephen Hendry	3
13	(England) Dave Harold	5
53	(Wales) Tony Chappel	1
8	(Wales) Darren Morgan	5
61	(Northern Ireland) Terry Murphy	2
39	(Wales) Mark Williams	5
10	(England) Peter Ebdon	5
33	(Scotland) Billy Snaddon	2
4	(England) John Parrott	5
32	(Northern Ireland) Dennis Taylor	1
11	(Scotland) John Higgins	4
190	(Scotland) Graeme Dott	5
62	(Scotland) Chris Small	1
(England) Paul Hunter	5
35	(Scotland) Drew Henry	5
2	(England) Steve Davis	2

Quarter-finals; Best of 9 frames
13	(England) Dave Harold	5
8	(Wales) Darren Morgan	3
39	(Wales) Mark Williams	5
10	(England) Peter Ebdon	3
4	(England) John Parrott	5
190	(Scotland) Graeme Dott	2
(England) Paul Hunter	5
35	(Scotland) Drew Henry	4

Semi-finals; Best of 11 frames
13	(England) Dave Harold	1
39	(Wales) Mark Williams	6
4	(England) John Parrott	6
(England) Paul Hunter	1

Final; Best of 17 frames
39	(Wales) Mark Williams	9
4	(England) John Parrott	3
