= Mehmet Husnu =

Cypriot snooker player (born 1972)

Personal information
- Born: 25 July 1972 (age 54)

Sport
- Country: Cyprus
- Sport: Snooker
- Professional: 1991–1997, 1998–2002, 2003/2004
- Highest ranking: 97 (1992–93)
- Maximum breaks: 1
- Best ranking finish: Last 32 (x2)

Mehmet Husnu (born 25 July 1972) is a Cypriot former professional snooker player.

== Career ==
Born in 1972, Husnu turned professional in 1991, becoming the first Cypriot professional snooker player in the history of the game.

Husnu's career highlights came in his first two seasons; he reached the last 32 of the 1992 European Open, losing 0–5 to Jimmy White, and the same stage of the 1993 Welsh Open, where he was defeated 1–5 by James Wattana. He also made a 147 break during the 1999 China International tournament.

Husnu's opponent in his first qualifying match for the 1993 World Championship was Spencer Dunn, who defeated him 5–2; the match was Dunn's seventh en route to appearing in the last 32 at the Crucible Theatre.

Having performed poorly in the intervening years, Husnu was ranked 145th in the world at the end of the 1996/97 season, and lost his place on the tour, being forced to qualify to regain it the following year. This he did, subsequently maintaining his status for four years, before being relegated once more in 2002.

During the 2002/2003 season, Husnu reached the final of the 2002 Benson & Hedges Championship, losing 6–9 to Mark Davis, but having earned back his professional status, lost it again in 2004.

He entered several tournaments in 2004 and 2005, but after failing to qualify for the 2006 World Championship, Husnu left competitive snooker, aged 33.

== Performance and rankings timeline ==
Tournament	1991/ 92	1992/ 93	1993/ 94	1994/ 95	1995/ 96	1996/ 97	1997/ 98	1998/ 99	1999/ 00	2000/ 01	2001/ 02	2002/ 03	2003/ 04	2004/ 05	2005/ 06
Ranking (Note: It shows the ranking at the beginning of the season.)	(Note: New players on the Main Tour don't have a ranking.)	97	133	166	208	159	(Note: He was an amateur.)		130	118	107				
Ranking tournaments
Grand Prix (Note: The event was called the LG Cup (2001/2002-2003/2004))	LQ	LQ	LQ	LQ	LQ	LQ	A	LQ	LQ	LQ	A	A	LQ	A	A
UK Championship	LQ	LQ	LQ	LQ	LQ	LQ	A	LQ	LQ	LQ	A	A	LQ	A	A
Malta Cup (Note: The event was called the Irish Open (1998/1999) and the European Open (1991/1992-1996/1997 and 2001/2002-2003/2004))	2R	LQ	LQ	LQ	LQ	LQ	NH	LQ	Not Held		A	A	LQ	A	A
Welsh Open	LQ	2R	LQ	LQ	LQ	LQ	A	LQ	LQ	LQ	A	A	LQ	A	A
China Open (Note: The event was called the China International (1997/1998-1998/1999))	Tournament Not Held						NR	LQ	LQ	LQ	A	Not Held		A	A
World Championship	LQ	LQ	LQ	LQ	LQ	LQ	LQ	LQ	LQ	LQ	LQ	LQ	LQ	LQ	LQ
Non-ranking tournaments
Masters	LQ	LQ	LQ	LQ	LQ	A	A	LQ	LQ	LQ	LQ	LQ	LQ	A	A
Former ranking tournaments
Classic	LQ	Tournament Not Held													
Strachan Open	LQ	MR	NR	Tournament Not Held											
Asian Classic (Note: The event was called the Dubai Classic (1991/1992-1994/1995) and the Thailand Classic (1995/1996))	LQ	LQ	LQ	LQ	LQ	LQ	Tournament Not Held								
German Masters (Note: The event was called the German Open (1995/1996-1997/1998))	Tournament Not Held				LQ	LQ	A	NR	Tournament Not Held						
Malta Grand Prix	Tournament Not Held			Non-Ranking Event					LQ	NR	Tournament Not Held				
Thailand Masters (Note: The event was called the Asian Open (1991/1992-1992/1993) and the Thailand Open (1993/1994-1996/1997))	LQ	LQ	LQ	LQ	LQ	LQ	A	LQ	LQ	LQ	A	NR	Tournament Not Held		
Players Championship (Note: The event was called the International Open (1992/1993-1996/1997) and the Scottish Open (1997/1998-2002/2003))	NH	LQ	LQ	LQ	LQ	1R	A	LQ	LQ	LQ	A	A	LQ	Not Held	
British Open	LQ	LQ	LQ	LQ	LQ	LQ	A	LQ	LQ	LQ	A	A	LQ	A	NH
Irish Masters	Non-Ranking Event											A	LQ	A	NH

Performance Table Legend
LQ	lost in the qualifying draw	#R	lost in the early rounds of the tournament (WR = Wildcard round, RR = Round robin)	QF	lost in the quarter-finals
SF	lost in the semi-finals	F	lost in the final	W	won the tournament
DNQ	did not qualify for the tournament	A	did not participate in the tournament	WD	withdrew from the tournament

NH / Not Held	means an event was not held.
NR / Non-Ranking Event	means an event is/was no longer a ranking event.
R / Ranking Event	means an event is/was a ranking event.
MR / Minor-Ranking Event	means an event is/was a minor-ranking event.
