= Shawn Budd =

Australian snooker and pool player

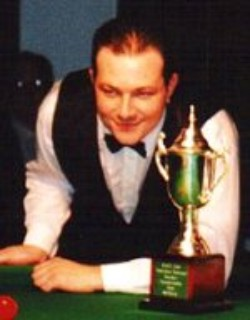

Personal information
- Born: 2 March 1974 (age 52) NSW, Australia

Sport
- Country: Australia
- Sport: Snooker
- Professional: 1992–1996, 1998/99

Shawn Budd (born 2 March 1974 in Sydney, Australia), is an Australian former snooker player and pool player that has won major snooker and pool tournaments in Australia, New Zealand, England and America. He is the only Australian snooker player ever to win the Australian Open Snooker, Australian National Snooker, Australian 9-ball and 8-ball titles. Also he has won the Oceania Snooker championships and was runner up in the Oceania Billiards Championship in the same year. In 2002 he was a quarter finalist in the IBSF World Billiards Championships (50 up). In 1994 he won the Valley National Open 8-ball tournament in Las Vegas (over 5000 entries) and in 2001 he won the Masters 8-ball event. The event is now called the World Pool Championships.

== Life ==
Budd grew up in the Sydney suburb of Coogee. His grandfather, from Liverpool, England, first taught Shawn how to play snooker.

He attended Marcellin College Randwick.

Budd's cousin is actor/director Michael Budd.

== Career ==
=== Early career ===
- 2-time Australian under-18 snooker champion
- 1994 Asian Pacific under-21 snooker champion – televised on the ABC
- 1994 Valley National Open 8 ball champion Las Vegas – over 5000 entries from 50 countries

Turned professional in 1992.

== Performance and rankings timeline ==
Tournament	1992/ 93	1993/ 94	1994/ 95	1995/ 96	1998/ 99
Ranking (Note: It shows the ranking at the beginning of the season)	(Note: New players on the Main Tour don't have a ranking)	423	348	457	
Ranking tournaments
Grand Prix	LQ	LQ	A	A	LQ
UK Championship	LQ	LQ	A	A	LQ
Irish Open (Note: The event was called the European Open (1992/1993–1995/1996))	LQ	LQ	A	A	LQ
Welsh Open	LQ	LQ	A	A	LQ
Scottish Open (Note: The event was called the International Open (1992/1993–1995/1996))	LQ	LQ	A	A	LQ
Thailand Masters (Note: The event was called the Asian Open (1992/1993) and the Thailand Open (1993/1994–1995/1996))	LQ	LQ	A	A	LQ
China International	Tournament Not Held				LQ
British Open	LQ	LQ	A	A	LQ
World Championship	LQ	A	LQ	A	LQ
Former ranking tournaments
Thailand Classic (Note: The event was called the Dubai Classic (1992/1993–1994/1995))	LQ	LQ	A	A	NH

Performance Table Legend
LQ	lost in the qualifying draw	#R	lost in the early rounds of the tournament (WR = Wildcard round, RR = Round robin)	QF	lost in the quarter-finals
SF	lost in the semi-finals	F	lost in the final	W	won the tournament
DNQ	did not qualify for the tournament	A	did not participate in the tournament	WD	withdrew from the tournament
DQ	disqualified from the tournament				

NH / Not Held	event was not held.
NR / Non-Ranking Event	event is/was no longer a ranking event.
R / Ranking Event	event is/was a ranking event.
MR / Minor-Ranking Event	event is/was a minor-ranking event.

=== 1995/1999 ===
- 1996 Bribie Island Open Champion
- 1997,98,99 Australia National snooker champion
- 1997 World Speed Pool Champion (Las Vegas)
- 1997 World Target Pool Champion (Las Vegas)
- 1997 IBSF World Championship Last 32
- 1997 Rooty Hills Masters Champion (3 consecutives centuries in final)
- 1998 IBSF World Championship Last 16
- 1998 WPBSA Oceania Qualifying Winner
- 1998 Princes Cup Winner
- 1999 Australian 8 ball champion held at Crown Casino
- 1999 Australian 9 ball Champion
- 1999 IBSF World Championship Last 16
- 1999 Central Coast Leagues Champion
- 1999 Fred Osbourne Albury Championship Runner Up
- Winner of the 1999 $100,000 8 ball Challenge – The largest prize money tournament ever held in Australia

=== 2000/2005 ===
- 2000, 2002, 2004 Australian Open Snooker Champion
- 2001 VNEA 8-ball Masters Champion Las Vegas
- 2004 R/up Australian National Snooker Championships

=== 2006/2016 ===
- 2006 NSW state 8 ball Champion
- 2007 R/Up Central Coast – Beaten by world number 1 Neil Robertson
- 2007 Semi finalist Australian 9 ball
- 2007 The first ever Australian Open Scotch Doubles Champions – Stuart Lawler and Shawn Budd- nominated to represent Australian in Rotterdam, September 2007
- 2007 Runner up Australian National snooker championships
- 2008–2009 Fred Osbourne Albury Championship winner
- 2009 South Pacific Snooker Champion
- 2009 Australian Open Snooker Champion
- 2010 Oceania Men's Snooker Championship
- 2012 South Pacific Snooker Champion
- 2012 Australian Open Snooker Champion
- 2013 NSW 9 Ball Champion
- 2013 Australian Open 8 Ball Champion
- 2016 Lance Pannell Snooker winner
- 2016 Australian 10 Ball Champion
- 2016 Oceania 9 Ball Champion
