= Spencer Dunn (snooker player) =

English snooker player

Personal information
- Born: 25 November 1969 (age 56) Stourbridge, West Midlands, England

Sport
- Country: England
- Sport: Snooker
- Professional: 1992–1995
- Highest ranking: 145 (1994/1995)
- Best ranking finish: Last 32 (x1)

Spencer Dunn (born 25 November 1969) is an English former professional snooker player.

== Career ==
Dunn was born in 1969, and turned professional in 1992. At the end of the 1992/1993 season, having failed to progress beyond the qualifying rounds of any tournament, he entered the 1993 World Championship. There, he won his first qualifying match against Ian Bullimore 5–1, before embarking on a run of another ten successive victories to reach the last 32 at the Crucible Theatre. Having beaten Bullimore, Dunn defeated Colin Mitchell by the same scoreline, Elliott Clark 5–4, Neil Selman 5–1, Julian Goodyear 5–1, Kieran McAlinden 5–4, Mehmet Husnu 5–2, Bill Oliver 10–2, Colin Roscoe 10–7, Dave Harold 10–7 and Mark Bennett 10–9, setting up an encounter with Nigel Bond. In the event, Dunn was unable to progress any further; he trailed 1–6 and, although he recovered to 4–8, could not prevent himself from losing 4–10.

Dunn's eleven qualifying wins to reach the main stages of the World Championship remain a tournament record; incidentally his nearest challengers, John Giles and Ronnie O'Sullivan who won ten matches, also achieved their feats in the 1993 event.

Dunn failed to progress further than the last 96 of any tournament in the following two seasons; having been ranked 145th in the world for the 1994/1995 season, he lost his professional status in 1995.
