= John Giles (snooker player) =

English snooker player

Personal information
- Born: 24 July 1969 (age 57)

Sport
- Country: England
- Sport: Snooker
- Professional: 1992–1997, 1998/1999
- Highest ranking: 108 (1994/1995)
- Best ranking finish: Last 32 (x2)

John Giles (born 24 July 1969) is an English former professional snooker player.

== Career ==
Born in 1969, Giles turned professional in 1992. In his debut season, he won the majority of the matches he played, but due to the vast number of players competing in qualifying for each event, did not progress beyond the last 128 of any of the ranking tournaments for most of that season. He won six matches in the 1992 Dubai Classic but was defeated by Mark Davis 1–5 in the seventh qualifying round, losing his eighth match in that year's Grand Prix also to Davis by the same scoreline, and lost 4–5 to Andrew Cairns in the last 128 at the British Open.

At the 1993 World Championship, qualifying for which was held near the start of the season, Giles defeated Tessa Davidson 5–3, Stan Haslam 5–1, Paul Maskell by the same scoreline, Barry Bunn 5–2, Simon Haggerty 5–0, Jamie Woodman 5–2, Andrew Cairns 10–2, Tony Meo 10–9, John Campbell 10–3 and Tony Knowles 10–6 to reach the last 32 stage - the first round at the Crucible Theatre.

Giles had won ten matches to qualify for the televised stages of the tournament, a feat bettered only by Spencer Dunn, who won eleven matches in the same event. In the event, Giles could not replicate his stellar form in his match against Steve James; he held James to 1–3 but came to trail 1–9. Although Giles won the eleventh frame and had left James requiring a snooker in the next, James recovered to win it 73–70, and was victorious by ten frames to two.

Reaching the Crucible earned Giles £8,000, but his best performance the following season was a run to the last 96 of the 1993 UK Championship, where he lost 1–5 to a resurgent Alex Higgins. In spite of his poor form, Giles reached his highest ranking, 108th, for the 1994/1995 season.

Giles progressed to the last 96 at two ranking events the following season; at the 1994 UK Championship, he lost 4–5 to Danny Fowler, and at the 1995 British Open, Steve Newbury defeated him 5–2.

Some success came in 1995/1996; Giles reached the last 32 at the 1996 Welsh Open, defeating Hugh Abernethy, Joe Jogia, Les Dodd and Martin Clark before being whitewashed 5–0 by Drew Henry.

The following season, Giles met Steve Davis in the last 64 at the 1996 Grand Prix, where he lost 2–5.

Having lost his professional status at the end of the 1996/1997 season, Giles entered ten qualifying events to regain it for the following season, and was successful. However, he dropped off the tour once more in 1999, aged 29. Giles' last professional match was another against Dodd, in the 1999 World Championship; on this occasion, Dodd won their third-round qualifying encounter 10–8.
