= Stephen O'Connor (snooker player) =

Irish snooker player

Personal information
- Born: 15 October 1972 (age 54)

Sport
- Country: Ireland
- Sport: Snooker
- Professional: 1991–2001
- Highest ranking: 68th

Stephen O'Connor (born 15 October 1972) is an Irish former professional snooker player. He was the IBSF World Snooker Championship title winner in 1990, and played professionally from 1991 to 2001.

== Career ==
O'Connor grew up in a family with three brothers and four sisters. He first played snooker at a local club in Edenmore when he was 12 and made a maximum break in practice aged 16.

Nicknamed Sid, O'Connor won the Republic of Ireland National Senior Snooker Championship in 1990, defeating Richard McHugh 8–4 in the final. He was 18 years and 40 days when he secured the World Amateur Snooker Championship title in Colombo, Sri Lanka on November 25 November 1990, defeating Steve Lemmens of Belgium in the final 11–8.

He turned professional for the start of the 1991–92 snooker season. The furthest he progressed in his first season was winning four matches in the qualifying competition for the 1992 Classic; he lost 4–5 to Graham Miles in round 5. In the first qualifying round of the 1992 World Championship he beat Chris Carpenter 6-4, but in round two John Read defeated him 6–4.

He defeated John Rea, Cliff Thorburn, Pat Kenny, and Peter Francisco in the qualifiers of the 1993 World Championship to reach the main stage for the first and only time of his career. He lost 1–10 to John Parrott in the first round.

In 1994, O'Connor took part in the longest frame at the non-televised stage of a ranking event, when a frame lasted 92 minutes and 59 seconds in his match against Thorburn at the Welsh Open.

He reached the penultimate round of qualifying of the 1999 World Championship, but he lost to Jonathan Birch.

His last match as a professional was a 1–10 defeat to Sean Storey in the qualifying competition for the 2001 World Championship. O'Connor finished the 2000–01 season ranked 108th and was relegated from the professional ranks. The highest ranking he attained during his career was 68th.
