= Shaun Mellish =

English snooker player

Personal information
- Born: 10 January 1970 (age 56)

Sport
- Country: England
- Sport: Snooker
- Professional: 1991–1997
- Highest ranking: 85 (1993/1994)
- Best ranking finish: Last 32 (x1)

Shaun Mellish (born 10 January 1970) is an English former professional snooker player.

== Career ==
Born in 1970, Mellish turned professional in 1991. In his first season, he enjoyed a run to the last 48 at the 1992 World Championship, defeating six opponents including Mike Dunn, Mike Darrington, Marcel Gauvreau, Les Dodd and Tony Chappel before being drawn against New Zealander Dene O'Kane. In their match, O'Kane compiled a century break in eliminating Mellish 10–4.

Beginning the 1992/1993 season ranked 120th, Mellish reached the last 64 at the 1992 UK Championship, where he lost 7–9 to Alan McManus, and the same stage at the International Open, where Steve James beat him 5–3. At the World Championship, entering at the seventh qualifying round, he overcame Simon Morris 5–2, Karl Burrows 10–4, Ian Graham 10–7, Wayne Jones 10–7 and Ken Doherty 10–4 to qualify for the final stages at the Crucible Theatre for the first time in his career. Mellish was drawn to play Willie Thorne but, having recovered from 1–5 to trail only 6–7, could not prevent a 6–10 defeat.

The performance in the World Championship had earned Mellish £8,000, and he began the following season ranked 85th - a career best. However, that season went poorly, producing only two match wins - over Declan Hughes in the European Open, and Bradley Jones in the International Open - and he dropped to 94th as a result.

Mellish improved with three wins during the 1994/1995 season, but earned no prize money; the next two years brought no upturn in fortunes, and he was relegated from the main tour, ranked 314th, in 1997.

Mellish next played competitively in the 2001 World Championship, where he reached the fourth qualifying round before losing 4–5 to Ricky Walden. During the following two seasons, he entered various Challenge Tour events and qualifying for the World Championship, but was unable to re-qualify for the main tour.
