= Mike Darrington =

English snooker player (1931–2011)

Personal information
- Born: Michael John Darrington; 13 September 1931 Weymouth, Dorset, England
- Died: 16 January 2011 (aged 79) High Wycombe, Buckinghamshire, England

Sport
- Country: England
- Sport: Snooker
- Professional: 1982–1996
- Highest ranking: 78 (1986/1987)

Michael John Darrington (13 September 1931 – 16 January 2011) was an English professional snooker player from High Wycombe, Buckinghamshire.

== Career ==
As an amateur, Darrington was the Home Counties snooker champion seven times, and defeated Steve Davis in the 1978 English Amateur Championship. He also won the first Zimbabwe Open in November 1981. He turned professional in 1982. His only professional tournament in his first season was the 1983 World Championship; he faced Rex Williams in the first qualifying round, and lost 0–10.

During the next season, Darrington recorded the best performance his time as a professional would bring, in reaching the last 48 at the 1983 International Open. There, he defeated Ian Williamson 5–3 before losing 2–5 to Silvino Francisco. At the non-ranking 1985 English Professional Championship he was whitewashed 0–9 by John Virgo in his first match. Although he reached his highest ranking, 78th, for the 1986/1987 season, Darrington rarely made any progress in qualifying for events, and won only one match in the 1993–94 snooker season. He did not compete on the main tour thereafter.

== Personal life and death ==
Michael John Darrington was born in Weymouth, Dorset, England, but moved to High Wycombe, Buckinghamshire. He died there on 16 January 2011, aged 79.
