= Karl Broughton =

English snooker player

Personal information
- Born: 26 June 1971 (age 55)

Sport
- Country: England
- Sport: Snooker
- Professional: 1991–2001
- Highest ranking: 41 (1997–98)
- Best ranking finish: Quarter-final (x1)

Karl Broughton (born 26 June 1971) is an English former professional snooker player.

== Career ==
Broughton was born in 1971, turning professional in 1991. He enjoyed the best performance of his career at the 1996 International Open, Broughton defeated Mark O'Sullivan, Oliver King, Anthony Davies, Darren Morgan, Wayne Jones and Chris Small before losing his quarter-final match, 2–5 to John Higgins.

The following season, Broughton reached the last 16 of the 1996 UK Championship, where he met Alain Robidoux and lost 8–9.

Broughton reached a highest ranking of 41st for the 1997/1998 season, and he finished the 2000/2001 season 119th in the world, thereafter being relegated from the professional tour.
