= Karl Payne =

English snooker player

Sport
- Country: England
- Sport: Snooker
- Professional: 1991–1999
- Highest ranking: 51 (1996–97)
- Best ranking finish: Last 32 (x4)

Karl Payne is an English former professional snooker player.

== Career ==
Payne turned professional in 1991. He initially had little success but broke into the top 64 of the world rankings after a good 1995/1996 season, in which he reached the last 32 in two ranking events.

Having begun the following season 51st in the world, Payne's form dipped thereafter, and he fell to 77th in 1997. Poor performances over the next two seasons led to Payne slipping to 109th in 1999, and following the conclusion of the 1998/99 season, he lost his professional status at the age of 29.

In 1999, Payne was a contestant on ITV variety show Stars in their Eyes. He did not make it past the heat stage.
