= 1995 World Snooker Championship =

Professional snooker tournament

1995 Embassy World Snooker Championship
Tournament information
- Dates: 14–30 April 1995
- Venue: Crucible Theatre
- City: Sheffield
- Country: England
- Organisation: WPBSA
- Format: Ranking event
- Total prize fund: £1,132,000
- Winner's share: £190,000
- Highest break: Stephen Hendry (SCO) (147)

Final
- Champion: Stephen Hendry (SCO)
- Runner-up: Nigel Bond (ENG)
- Score: 18–9

The 1995 World Snooker Championship (also referred to as the 1995 Embassy World Snooker Championship for the purposes of sponsorship) was a professional ranking snooker tournament that took place between 14 and 30 April 1995 at the Crucible Theatre in Sheffield, England. The tournament was sponsored by cigarette manufacturer Embassy.

== Background ==
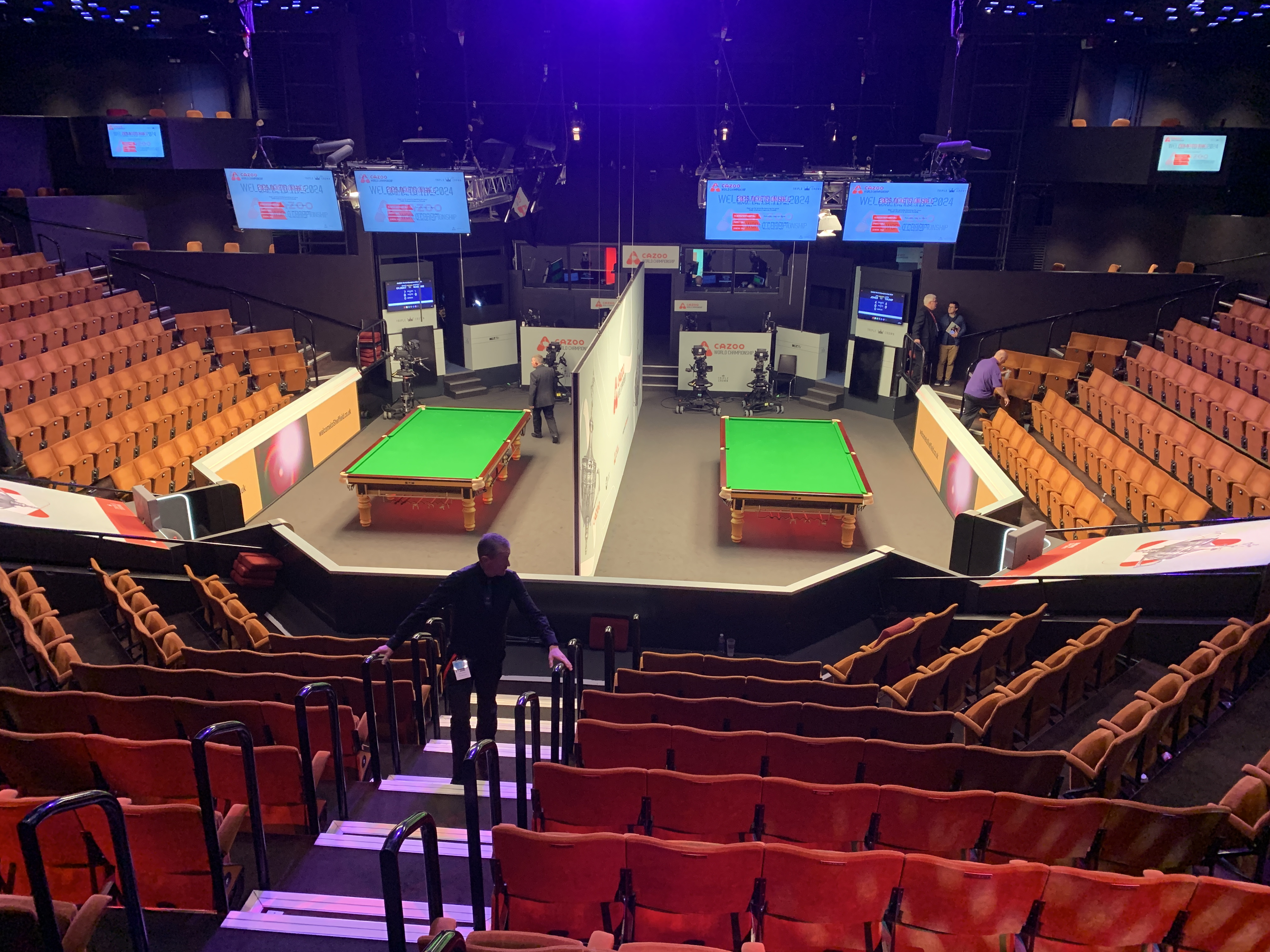
Setup of the arena at the Crucible Theatre, shown during the 2024 World Snooker Championship

The inaugural 1927 World Snooker Championship, then known as the Professional Championship of Snooker, took place at various venues in England between November 1926 and May 1927. Joe Davis won the final—held at Camkin's Hall in Birmingham from 9 to 12 May 1927—and went on to win the tournament 15 consecutive times before retiring undefeated after the 1946 edition (no tournaments were held from 1941 to 1945 because of World War II). The tournament went into abeyance after only two players contested the 1952 edition. The six editions of the World Professional Match-play Championship held between 1952 and 1957 are retroactively regarded as legitimate continuations of the World Snooker Championship, but that tournament was discontinued due to waning public interest in snooker in the post-war era. The world title was uncontested between 1958 and 1963.

Rex Williams was instrumental in reviving the World Snooker Championship on a challenge basis in 1964. John Pulman, winner of the 1957 World Professional Match-play Championship, defended the world title across seven challenge matches between 1964 and 1968. The World Snooker Championship reverted to an annual knockout tournament for the 1969 edition, marking the beginning of the championship's "modern era". The 1977 edition was the first staged at the Crucible Theatre in Sheffield, where it has remained since. As of 1995, the most successful players in the modern era were Ray Reardon and Steve Davis, each having won the title six times. Stephen Hendry was the tournament's youngest winner, having captured his first title at the 1990 event, aged 21 years and 106 days. Reardon was the oldest winner, having secured his sixth title at the 1978 event, aged 45 years and 203 days.

== Overview ==
The 1995 edition of the tournament—the 27th successive year that the World Snooker Championship was contested through the modern knockout format—took place from 14 to 30 April at the Crucible Theatre in Sheffield, England, the 19th consecutive year that the World Championship was staged at the venue. Until the 2020 event, postponed due to the COVID-19 pandemic, the 1995 edition was the last that started on a Friday rather than on a Saturday and did not finish on the May Day bank holiday, observed on the first Monday in May. Sponsored by cigarette brand Embassy, it was the ninth and last ranking tournament of the 1994–95 season, held after the British Open. The defending champion was Stephen Hendry, who had defeated Jimmy White 18–17 in the final of the 1994 World Championship to win the title.

=== Format ===
The top 16 players in the snooker world rankings were seeded through to the main stage at the Crucible Theatre. They faced 16 players who progressed through the qualifying rounds. First-round matches were played as the best of 19 frames, held over two sessions. Second-round and quarter-final matches were played as the best of 25 frames, held over three sessions. The semi-final matches were played as the best of 31 frames, held over four sessions. The final was the best of 35 frames, also held over four sessions.

=== Prize fund ===
The winner of the event received £190,000 from a total prize fund of £1,132,000. The breakdown of prize money for this year is shown below:

- Winner: £190,000
- Runner-up: £115,000
- Semi-final: £57,000
- Quarter-final: £29,000
- Last 16: £15,500
- Last 32: £8,750
- Last 48: £7,400
- Last 64: £4,450
- Last 96: £2,350
- Last 128: £1,475
- Highest break (televised phase): £16,000
- Highest break (qualifying rounds): £5,000
- Maximum break: £147,000
- Total: £1,132,000

== Summary ==
=== Qualifying ===
The qualifying competition was held at the Norbreck Hotel, Blackpool, between 4 and 20 January 1995. There were eight rounds; rounds one to three were the best of 9 frames and the later rounds were the best of 19.

The 1993 World Amateur champion Tai Pichit lost only three frames in three matches as he progressed to round five, then defeated Stuart Reardon 10–8. Barry Pinches made a total clearance of 136 in his 5–4 second round win against Matthew Stevens. Seven-time World Women's Snooker Championship winner Allison Fisher defeated Richard Somauroo on the final pink ball in round two, then beat Ian Sargeant 5–3. She led Roger Garrett 3–1 in round four, but eventually lost 4–10.

In round six, Anthony Hamilton made a break of 145 in the third frame of his 10–6 defeat of Nick Walker. It was the highest break that had ever been made in World Championship qualifying, superseding the previous record of 143. Pichit faced the 1972 and 1982 champion Alex Higgins. Higgins, trailing 3–7, was on a break of 103 in frame 11 when he asked the referee John Williams to move from what he said was his line of sight. Williams was standing behind and to the left of Higgins and refused to move when Higgins told him that he was in his "line of thought". Higgins started crying and went on to clear the table, his break of 137 being the highest he had ever made in 23 years of competing at the championship. Pichit won the match 10–5. The 1980 champion Cliff Thorburn lost 9–10 to Jamie Woodman. Joe Johnson, who won the title in 1986 and was runner-up in 1987, beat Matthew Couch 10–5. Nick Terry made breaks of 138 and 132 against Paul Cavney in the seventh round, but lost 8–10. Andy Hicks beat Johnson 10–2. Eddie Charlton, aged 65, lost 9–10 to Pinches.

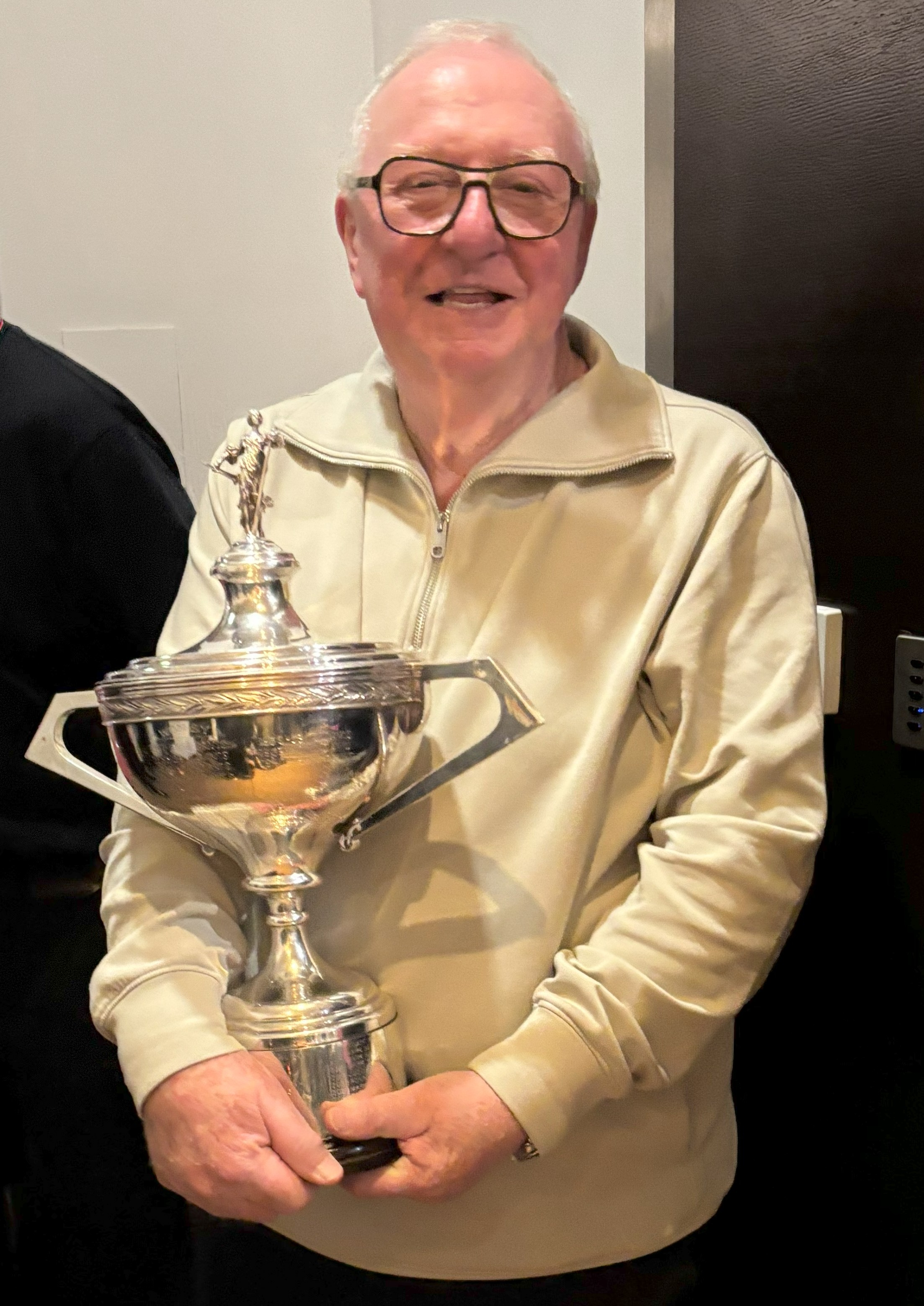
The 1985 winner Dennis Taylor (pictured in 2025 with the trophy) had been the only player to play at the Crucible Theatre every year since the World Championship moved there for the 1977 edition, but he lost in qualifying.

Twelve of the players seeded 17th to 32nd lost in the final qualifying round. Pichit was the only first-season professional to qualify, when he beat Mike Hallett 10–8. Cavney was 33 points behind Neal Foulds in the deciding frame, but made a break of 77 to win. The 1985 champion Dennis Taylor, who had been the only player to participate at the Crucible Theatre every year since the tournament moved there in 1977, lost 2–10 to Anthony Davies. Taylor complained about the format of the qualifying competition, where qualifying for multiple tournaments took place from 2 to 22 January, saying that "Anthony has played seven matches here in just over a week and he's got used to the conditions. That's a disadvantage for me ... there should be a break of at least a week between matches to make it fair for everyone." Former championship semi-finalist Tony Knowles, who was defeated 4–10 by Stephen Lee, also complained, saying "This venue is terrible and so is the system. We aren't being given a level playing field. So many top players lose here, the percentages are there for all to see."

The players who qualified for the main stage for the first time were Lee, Pichit, Cavney, Rod Lawler, Hicks, John Higgins, and Stefan Mazrocis. Hamilton won the £5,000 prize for the highest break of the qualifying rounds for his 145 against Walker.

=== First round ===
The first round took place from 14 to 19 April, each match played as the best of 19 frames over two sessions. The defending champion Stephen Hendry made breaks of 90, 128, 69, 50, and 114 to defeat the world number 73 Mazrocis 10–3. Debutant Cavney, trailing Tony Drago 8–0, won the last frame of the first day. He also took the first of the second session, but Drago then produced a break of 84 and also won the next frame for a 10–2 victory. James Wattana, the third seed, constructed a 4–1 lead against Gary Wilkinson winning four consecutive frames, but Wilkinson replied by winning the last four of the first session to lead. In the second session, Wattana led 6–5 and also 7–6 aided by an 83 break, but Wilkinson won the match 10–8. Lawler took the opening frame with a half-century, but Peter Ebdon, a quarter-finalist in the 1992 edition, replied with eight consecutive frames, featuring breaks of 107 and 57. Ebdon then sealed victory in the second session, taking the first and the third frames for a 10–2 scoreline.

Ken Doherty, winner of the 1994 Scottish Masters during the season, trailed Mark Davis 4–5 after the first session. Doherty levelled at 5–5 thanks to an 85 break and again at 6–6, but Davis went on to win 10–7. Jimmy White, who had been diagnosed with testicular cancer and undergone surgery during the season, eliminated Peter Francisco 10–2, winning three frames on the last black ball. "I was totally relaxed but I couldn't score heavily enough. But with my health problems behind me, I'll have to dig in and practise even more," White said. Unusual gambling patterns were detected before the match and all the betting was eventually suspended. The governing body, the World Professional Billiards and Snooker Association, launched an inquiry, which resulted in a five-year suspension for Francisco for "not conducting himself in a manner consistent with his status as a professional sportsman." White was cleared. Ronnie O'Sullivan compiled breaks of 80, 80, 112, 56, 111, 55, and 58 as he beat Dave Harold 10–3. The 112 break was a maximum break attempt which ended after he had potted fourteen red balls and fourteen blacks. "This game is all about taking your chances. It's not the negative, safety game it was a few years ago. This suits me fine as it's tailor-made for me," O'Sullivan said.

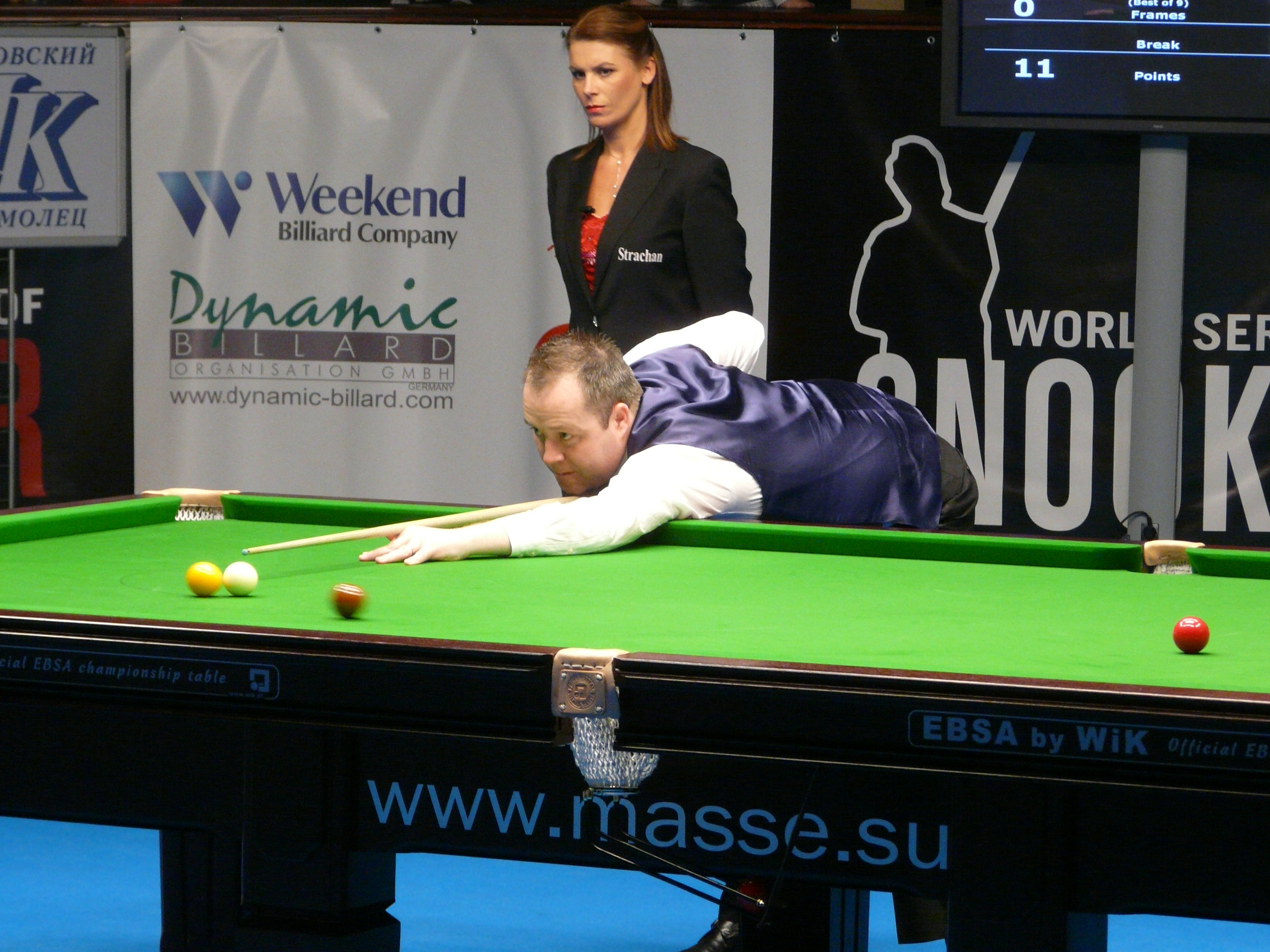
John Higgins (pictured in 2008) made his debut at the Crucible Theatre, losing 3–10 to Alan McManus in the first round.

Six-time World Champion Steve Davis trailed Hicks 3–6 after the first session. Hicks also added the first two frames of the second session. Davis won four in a row to reduce the deficit to one at 7–8, but Hicks secured victory with back-to-back half-centuries. Hicks called the win a "dream come true". It was only Davis's third first-round defeat at the World Championship. "I hate losing and the way I played last night ... I still enjoy playing the game, though perhaps not as much as I used to because I'm losing more often," Davis commented. Debutant John Higgins had won three ranking tournaments throughout the season and was second-favourite to win the World Championship. He fell 3–6 behind the two-time semi-finalist Alan McManus during the first session. McManus, whose highest break in the match was 99, won all four frames played in the second session to progress. "I think [Higgins] had a bit of a shock playing here for the first time. Every year I come to the Crucible it seems smaller and smaller. It's hard to describe but the pressure is tenfold and so different to anywhere else," McManus said.

Requiring victory to remain in the top 16 of the world rankings going into the next season, Terry Griffiths won three consecutive frames to lead Alain Robidoux 5–4 after the first session. Robidoux took the first two frames of the second session to go in front, but Griffiths replied by winning five in succession to advance to the second round. The match, which ended past midnight, lasted 7 hours and 42 minutes. David Roe made three half-centuries as he led Billy Snaddon by one frame after the first session. Snaddon tied the match with a break of 78, but Roe won five of the following six frames to progress. Darren Morgan produced breaks of 62, 62, and 100 to build a 7–2 lead against Davies. Davies took the first frame of the second session, but Morgan won three in a row to claim victory. Playing in his first season as a professional, Pichit led Willie Thorne 2–0. Thorne then won four frames in a row and went on to win 10–6. "I was perhaps a little over-cautious, I didn't know what to expect. But really it was a great draw for me as rookies seldom win their first match at the Crucible," Thorne said.

John Parrott, winner of the 1991 edition, made a highest break of 129 as he defeated Brian Morgan 10–5. Breaks of 60 and 58 gave Joe Swail a 5–2 advantage over Nigel Gilbert, who then tied the match with three consecutive frames at the beginning of the second session. Swail took four in a row, before Gilbert reduced the deficit to one at 8–9. The match required a third session, with only one frame, which Swail took for victory. The first session of the match between Nigel Bond and Stephen Lee was shared at 4–4. Lee went in front at 6–5, but Bond replied with three consecutive frames to lead 8–6. Lee won frames 15 and 16, before Bond secured the 17th and 18th to claim victory.

=== Second round ===
The second round took place from 19 to 23 April, each match played as the best of 25 frames over three sessions. Ebdon, who had been ill with bronchitis, complained that the recording of a BBC programme on the practice table left him with no time to warm up ahead of his match against Mark Davis. The table, as was later explained, belonged to the BBC. The first session of the match was shared, but Ebdon built a four-frame lead in the second. In the first frame of the third session, Ebdon compiled an 89 break, the highest of the match, to go 11–6 in front. He went on to win 13–7. "That was a tougher match than it seemed against a very good player who is destined for the top 16. With more experience Mark [Davis] will be very dangerous indeed," Ebdon said.

Hendry won the opening frame with a half-century, but Drago equalised with a 117 break. Hendry produced further breaks of 70, 79, and 73 to lead 5–3 after the first session. Hendry also took the first two frames of the second session and attempted a maximum break in the third, but he lost position on the black and the visit ended on 81. Drago also went for a 147, but he broke down on 88, missing a pot on a red ball. Going into the last session 11–5 in front, Hendry progressed with a 13–6 victory. "Obviously winning the frame is of paramount importance but when the choice comes early on between an easy blue and a risky black, it's worth taking a chance," Hendry said regarding the maximum attempts. Facing Darren Morgan, O'Sullivan took the opening frame and then led 4–1, but Morgan won the last three of the first session to tie the match. Breaks of 70, 82, and 86 gave Morgan an 8–4 lead in the second session. From that point on, O'Sullivan compiled breaks of 51, 51, 55, 64, 73, and 53 as he won nine consecutive frames for a 13–8 victory. "Ronnie [O'Sullivan] is unbelievable, he deserves what he gets. I just wish I was 19 and had the talent he has," Morgan said.

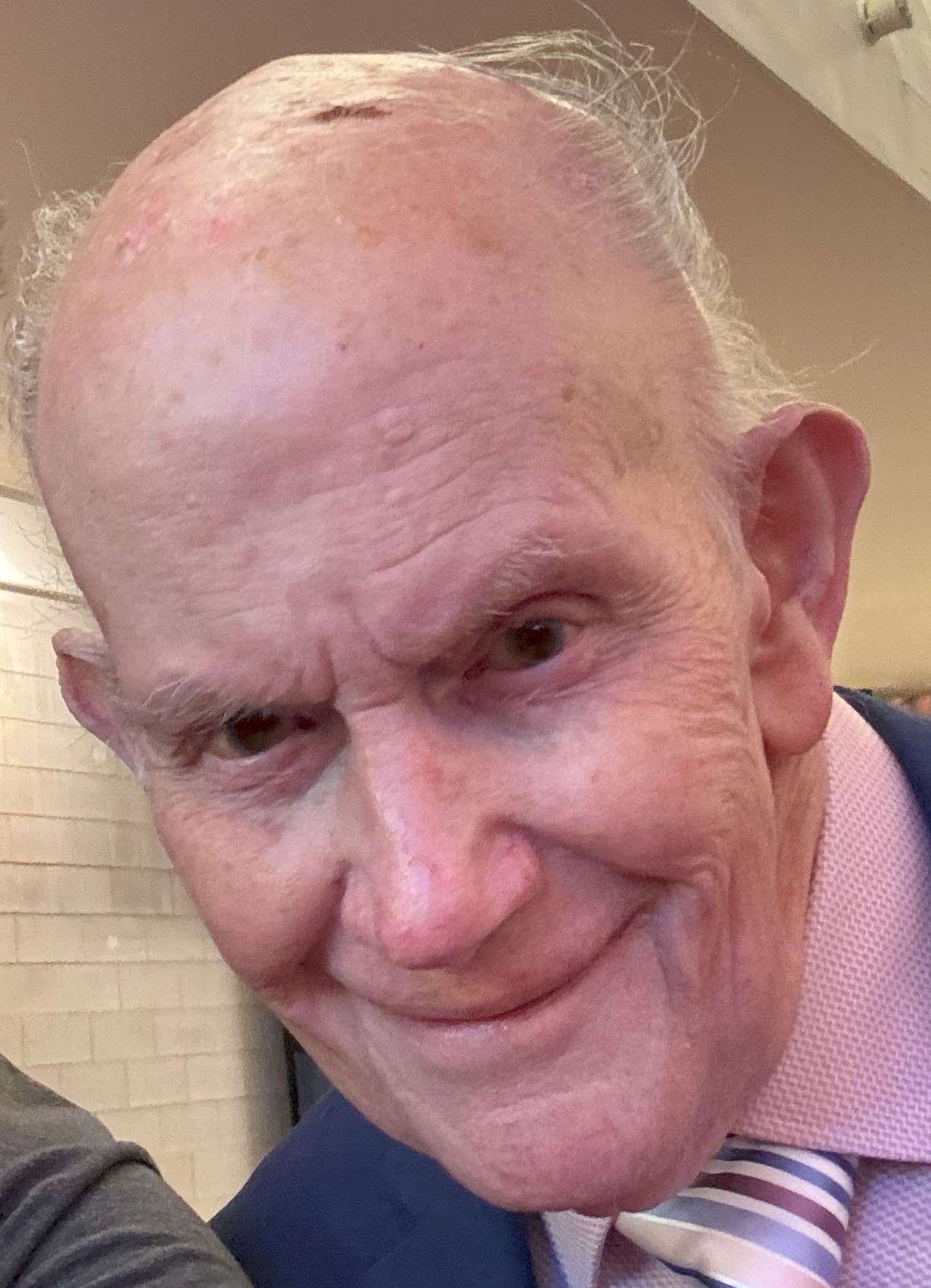
In the second-round match between Willie Thorne and Andy Hicks, referee John Williams (pictured in 2025) asked the players to solve a stalemate situation after one re-rack had already been called.

From 2–2, Wilkinson took the last three frames of the first session against Griffiths. The second session was shared, with breaks of 83 and 86 for Wilkinson and of 52 and 66 for Griffiths. Wilkinson went 10–6 ahead with a 72 break in the first frame of the third session. He compiled breaks of 57, 80, and 61 as he exchanged frames with Griffiths and won the match 13–9. Hicks produced breaks of 100 and 54 to lead Thorne 6–2 after the first session. Thorne won the first four frames of the second session to tie the scores. Hicks replied with three consecutive frames. There was a re-rack in frame 16, the last of the session, and the frame was then again in a stalemate situation. The referee, John Williams, told the players they had eight shots each to solve the situation or another re-rack would be called. Thorne, who was ahead in the frame, attempted a plant and missed it, allowing Hicks to clear up and go four frames clear at 10–6. Hicks compiled breaks of 117 and 66 in the third session to claim a 13–7 victory. After the match, Thorne complained, saying, "The rule over stalemate situations is nonsense. It's all right when players are tip-tapping about with 13 or 15 reds on the table, but not when someone is leading by 53 points. John [Williams] is a very good referee but like all referees, if they are fed up doing something for a couple of minutes, they want to start again, but it's our living. He didn't even consider the state of the match." Hicks replied that if Thorne "didn't huff and puff round the table so much he would probably be a better player."

Parrott made breaks of 65, 52, and 110 in the first session, but he trailed Swail 3–5. Parrott compiled further breaks of 53, 96, 93, and 115, but Swail held the two-frame lead with visits of 76, 70, and 51. In the third session, Parrott won three consecutive frames and tied the scores at 10–10. The next two frames were shared. In frame 23, Parrott fluked the final blue ball when trying to play it safe and took the lead at 12–11. He also won the next frame, clearing the green, brown, blue, pink, and black balls for victory. "I honestly didn't realise [Swail] was as good as that. I was hanging on his tail for two sessions and had to knock in the odd clearance just to keep in there. It was one of the toughest matches I've ever had," Parrott said.

White took the opening frame against Roe and also won the second with a half-century. Roe halved the deficit by winning frame three, but White won the remaining five of the first session to lead 7–1. Roe produced breaks of 58 and 74 in the second session as he reduced White's advantage to four frames at 6–10. Roe went three behind at the start of the last session, but White won the next three for victory, compiling a highest break of 96 in the penultimate frame. "I have not played at all well and I can't possibly win the title the way I'm playing. But I'm going to improve," White said. Facing Bond, McManus won the first frame with a 72 break. Bond took the next three in succession and then led 3–1, 3–2, and 4–2, before McManus produced breaks of 96 and 100 to tie the scores at the conclusion of the first session. Bond compiled a 115 break as he built a 6–4 lead, before McManus made two half-centuries to equalise again. The remaining four frames were shared for an 8–8 scoreline, with McManus producing breaks of 52 and 58. In the last session, Bond led 10–8 and 11–9 before securing a 13–10 victory.

=== Quarter-finals ===
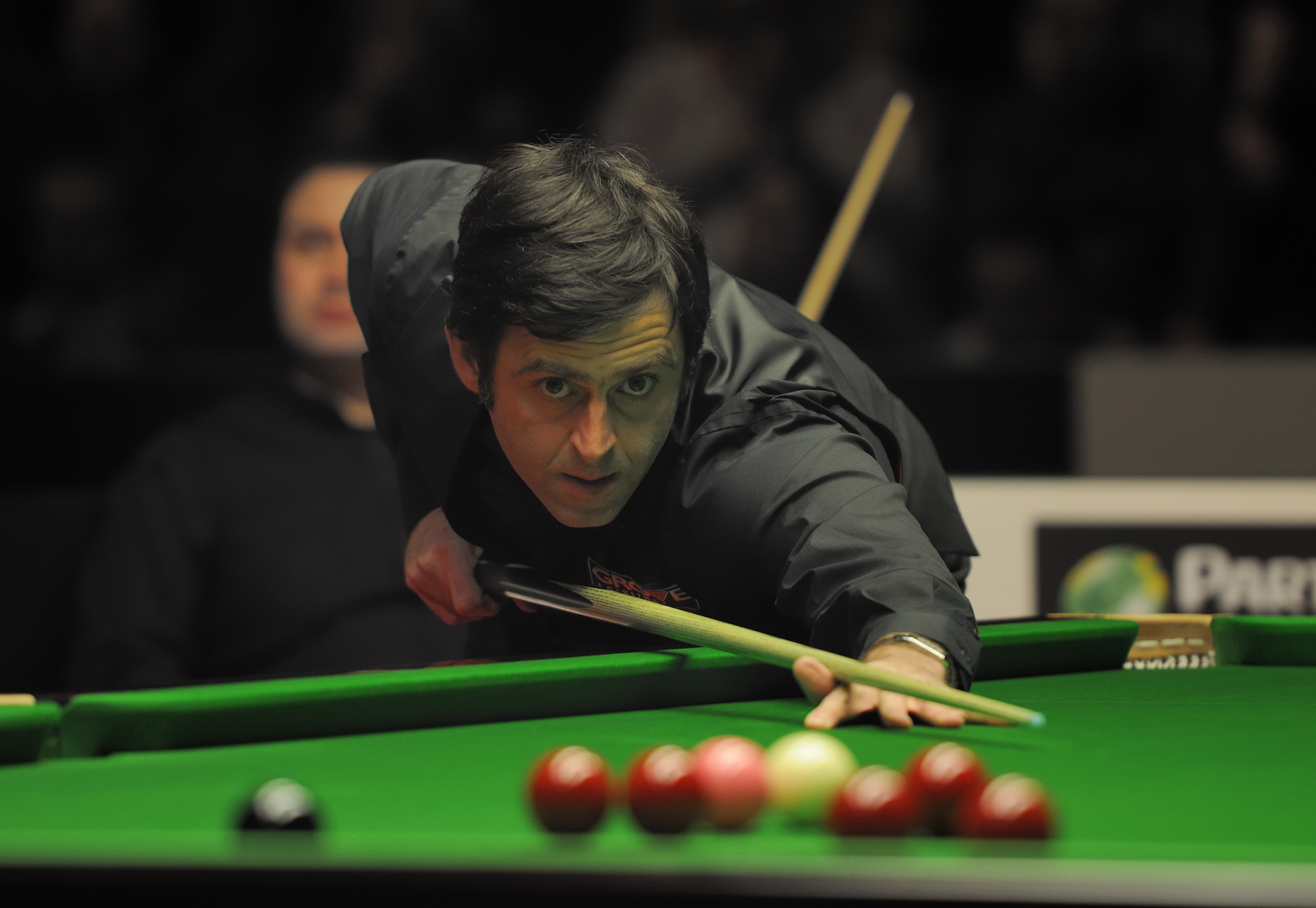
Ronnie O'Sullivan (pictured in 2012) was eliminated in the quarter-finals by Stephen Hendry, who praised him as "the most talented player" he had ever seen.

The quarter-finals took place on 24 and 25 April, each match played as the best of 25 frames over three sessions. O'Sullivan faced Hendry. "Stephen [Hendry] says he's the best player in the world, and on paper he is. That means I have it all to do but I'm hungry for success. I wonder whether he might have lost some of the hunger he used to have," O'Sullivan said ahead of the match. O'Sullivan won the opening frame. Hendry produced breaks of 60, 51, and 63 as he took a 4–2 lead. O'Sullivan halved the deficit with a 66 break in the next, but Hendry closed the first session with a break of 72. The second session was shared, with breaks of 62, 97, 103, and 86 by Hendry and two half-centuries by O'Sullivan. O'Sullivan then won the first frame of the last session to edge closer at 8–9, but, in the next frame, he committed a foul by unintentionally potting a red when playing a blue. Hendry compiled breaks of 88, 84, and 133 as he won four frames in a row for a 13–8 victory. It was Hendry's 18th consecutive victory at the Crucible, equalling Davis's record. Hendry praised O'Sullivan as "the most talented player" he had ever seen and said, "Some of the things Ronnie says [do] make you wonder whether he gives the game the respect it deserves. It would be a shame to see his talent wasted though somehow I don't think it will."

Ebdon compiled breaks of 50 and 85 as he built a 3–0 lead, but Hicks replied with contributions of 92 and 58 to tie. The last two frames of the first session were shared. Hicks made breaks of 58, 60, 64, 65, and 59 as he won seven of the eight frames played in the second session. Ebdon took the first two of the last session to reduce the deficit to four at 7–11. Hicks took the next to go within a frame of a place in the semi-finals. Ebdon manufactured a century break in frame 20, but Hicks won the 21st with a half-century to claim victory. He became the first player since Griffiths in 1979 to reach the semi-finals of the World Championship on his debut. "I was playing well in practice and I knew that there was no reason why I wouldn't do well here," Hicks said, adding that "there were butterflies." "I was outplayed. If [Hicks] continues in that vein, there's no reason why he can't win the championship", Ebdon said.

Parrott produced a half-century to win the first frame and also won the third to lead White 2–1. White won the following two to take the lead for the first time in the match. The sixth frame was decided on the last black ball, which White potted to complete a 69 clearance. He also secured frame seven and he came from behind in the last of the session to hold a four-frame advantage. Both players made a half-century as the first four frames of the second session were shared. Parrott then won four in a row to tie the match, making a 123 break in the process. White restored his lead with a half-century in the first frame of the third session. He also led 10–9, before Parrott won two frames in a row. White then added three more frames to progress with a 13–11 result.

Wilkinson took the opening frame with a 63 break, but Bond won the next two. Wilkinson produced a 78 break to tie the scores, but he then trailed 2–3 and, by the end of the first session, 3–5. Bond extended his lead to three frames with a 65 break, before Wilkinson made an 85 break as he took three frames in a row to equalise. Bond won three of the remaining four frames to hold a two-frame lead. Going into the last session 9–7, Bond secured all four frames for victory. "I knew Gary [Wilkinson] would be hard to beat and I could hardly believe it when I led 5–3 at the end of the first session. I was outplayed but he missed a couple of balls at vital moments," Bond said.

=== Semi-finals ===
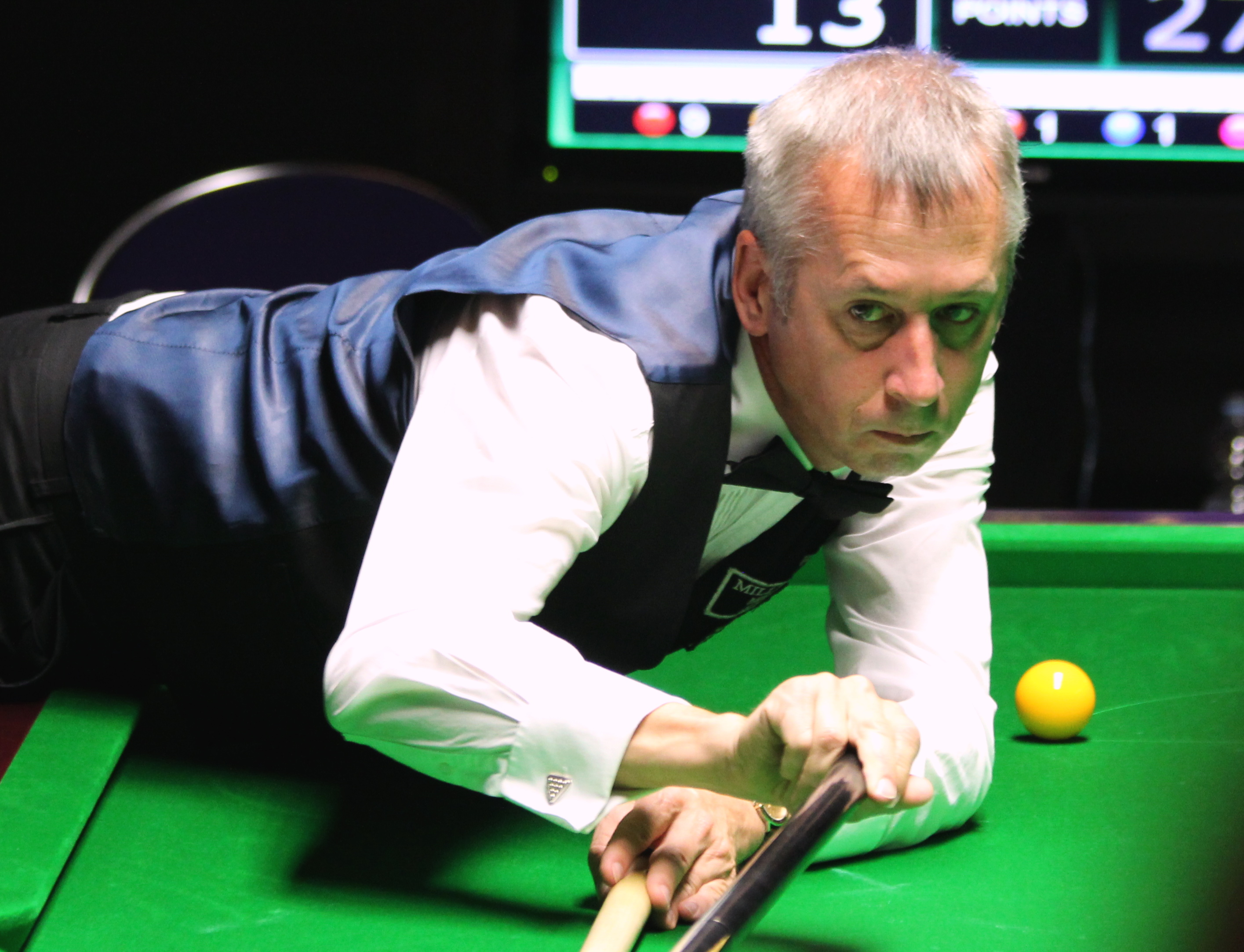
Nigel Bond (pictured in 2016) defeated Andy Hicks 16–11 in the semi-finals to reach his first World Championship final, but he lost to Stephen Hendry.

The semi-finals took place from 26 to 28 April, played as the best of 31 frames over four sessions. Hendry faced White, whom he had defeated four times in the final, including the previous three editions. White took the opening frame with a 71 break, but Hendry won the next two to take the lead. He also led 4–2. White made a 73 break in frame seven, but Hendry held on to the lead with a century break in the last of the first session. The first two frames of the second session were shared, with an 86 break by Hendry and an 89 by White. Hendry followed with a break of 119 in frame eleven and made a maximum break in the next. It was the third 147 in the history of the tournament and Hendry's second in professional competition. Hendry was awarded a bonus of £147,000 for the maximum and also won the tournament's highest break prize of £16,000. White won the remaining three frames of the session, featuring breaks of 67, 80, and 82, to reduce the arrears to one frame at 7–8. "The concentration Stephen used took a lot out of him. He was absolutely drained. I'm just glad he did it today and not in the morning because it could have been very damaging," Ian Doyle, Hendry's manager, said regarding the frames won by White after the 147.

In the third session, Hendry manufactured a 121 break as he won the first four frames to lead 12–7. White won two of the remaining three. Hendry took the first of the final session, before White produced breaks of 75 and 68 to take three consecutive frames and reduce the deficit to 12–14. Breaks of 72 and 100 secured Hendry a place in the final with a 16–12 result. The last century break was his ninth during the event, setting a record for the most number of centuries in one edition of the World Championship. By winning, Hendry also broke Davis's record of 18 consecutive victories at the Crucible. "I can't feel any sympathy for Jimmy [White] at the table but after what he has been through recently, it is tremendous judgment to his character that he's even here playing that kind of snooker. He will be back and it's a crime he's now out of the top four. With the talent he has, he should have won fifty titles," Hendry said. White praised his opponent, saying, "He played fantastic snooker, he's so solid it's incredible. If you punish him, you have a chance. If not, he goes from strength to strength."

Bond, playing in the semi-finals of the World Championship for the first time in his career, faced Hicks. Hicks won the opening frame by making a 42 clearance to tie and then potting the re-spotted black. Hicks missed a red and a pink in the following frames as Bond made breaks of 61, 64, 63, and 54 to win six in a row. Bond made a 101 break as the first four frames of the second session were shared. Bond then won the remaining three frames to go eight clear at 11–3. Bond also took the first two frames of the third session. Hicks won four of the next five, featuring a break of 80 in frame 21, but Bond took the last. Trailing 7–15, Hicks produced breaks of 136, 79, 67, and 79 as he reduced the deficit to four, but Bond made a half-century in the next frame to win the match 16–11. "It will be a dream come true if I go on and win the championship. I'll be the underdog, but I have nothing to lose and everything to gain. I'm also capable of beating anyone if I play the snooker I know I can produce," Bond said. "I missed so many game-balls and [Bond] punished me for it. He kept winning the first frame after each interval yesterday and [with him] having led 6–1 overnight I just couldn't get back at him," Hicks said.

=== Final ===
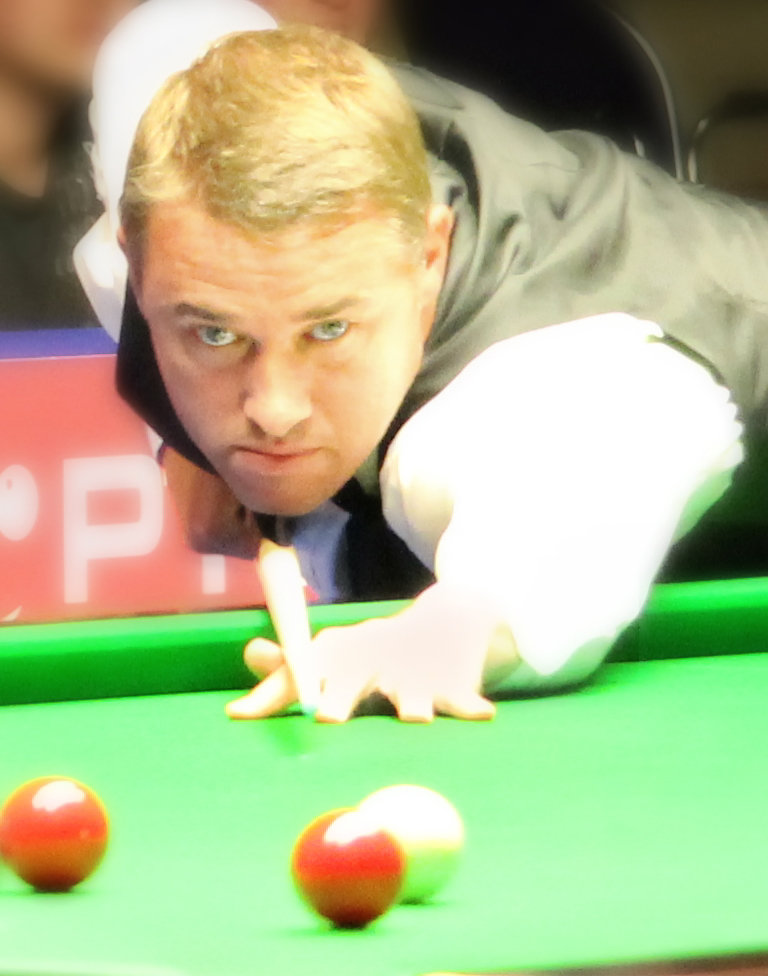
Stephen Hendry (pictured in 2011) defeated Nigel Bond 18–9 in the final to claim his fifth World Championship. His fourth consecutive win, he broke Steve Davis's record in the modern era. In the semi-finals, he compiled the third maximum break in the history of the tournament.

The best-of-35-frame final took place over four sessions on 29 and 30 April between Hendry and Bond. The pair had met in one ranking final before, the only one Bond had reached until then, with Hendry the winner at the 1990 Grand Prix. Hendry took the opening frame with a break of 61. Bond then went 3–1 ahead with breaks of 57 and 77. Hendry won two of the remaining three of the first session, featuring contributions of 72 and 101, to trail 3–4. The first two frames of the second session were shared, before Hendry won seven in a row with breaks of 60, 81, 70, 63, 124, 60, and 84 to lead 11–5 after the first day. In the third session, Hendry extended his lead to nine frames at 14–5 aided by breaks of 75 and 53. Bond replied with three consecutive frames, but Hendry secured the last two of the session with visits of 71 and 83. Going into the fourth and last session, Hendry held a 16–8 lead. He took the first frame with a break of 92 to go within one frame from victory. Bond compiled a 111 break in the next frame, but Hendry produced another century break to win the match.

It was Hendry's fifth title. He became the first player to win the title at the Crucible four years in a row, breaking Davis's previous record of three in the modern era. "I know what I'm capable of and every time I come to the Crucible I'm charged up, even if I haven't had a very good season. Someone will have to play unbelievably well to beat me at the Crucible," Hendry said. He later wrote that he had "little fear" of facing Bond in the final; he rated Bond as "talented" but without a "killer instinct", contrasting that with his own ability to top the world rankings consistently: "It takes selfishness and a bit of unpleasantness to be able to bully, harass and psyche out opponents. I have all that in spades – on the table at least."

Hendry was awarded £190,000 in prize money, added to the £163,000 for the maximum break compiled in the semi-finals. He also received a Ferrari 348i with an estimated value of £200,000 from his sponsors Sweater Shop for winning the tournament. He earnt £740,555 in prize money during the 1994–95 season, a new record; O'Sullivan was the second-biggest earner of the season, taking £285,175. Bond received £115,000 as runner up. In the 1995–96 world rankings published after the tournament, Hendry was first, for the sixth consecutive year. Davis was second, with 42,395 points compared to Hendry's 50,042. Runner-up Bond fell one place to 12th. Of the semi-finalists, Hicks rose from 33rd to 17th and White dropped from fourth to seventh.

== Main draw ==
The draw for the main tournament is shown below. The numbers in parentheses after the players' names denote the seedings for the 16 seeded players. The match winners are shown in bold.

**First round** Best of 19 frames
14 April
**Stephen Hendry (SCO) (1)**	**10**
Stefan Mazrocis (ENG)	3
14 & 15 April
**Tony Drago (MLT) (16)**	**10**
Paul Cavney (ENG)	2
15 & 16 April
**Ronnie O'Sullivan (ENG) (9)**	**10**
Dave Harold (ENG)	3
17 April
**Darren Morgan (WAL) (8)**	**10**
Anthony Davies (WAL)	3
18 April
**John Parrott (ENG) (5)**	**10**
Brian Morgan (ENG)	5
18 & 19 April
**Joe Swail (NIR) (12)**	**10**
Nigel Gilbert (ENG)	8
16 & 17 April
**David Roe (ENG) (13)**	**10**
Billy Snaddon (SCO)	6
15 & 16 April
**Jimmy White (ENG) (4)**	**10**
Peter Francisco (RSA)	2
14 & 15 April
James Wattana (THA) (3)	8
**Gary Wilkinson (ENG)**	**10**
16 April
**Terry Griffiths (WAL) (14)**	**10**
Alain Robidoux (CAN)	6
18 & 19 April
**Nigel Bond (ENG) (11)**	**10**
Stephen Lee (ENG)	8
16 & 17 April
**Alan McManus (SCO) (6)**	**10**
John Higgins (SCO)	3
14 & 15 April
Ken Doherty (IRL) (7)	7
**Mark Davis (ENG)**	**10**
14 & 15 April
**Peter Ebdon (ENG) (10)**	**10**
Rod Lawler (ENG)	2
17 & 18 April
**Willie Thorne (ENG) (15)**	**10**
Tai Pichit (THA)	6
17 & 18 April
Steve Davis (ENG) (2)	7
**Andy Hicks (ENG)**	**10**

**Second round** Best of 25 frames
19, 20 & 21 April
**Stephen Hendry (SCO) (1)**	**13**
Tony Drago (MLT) (16)	6
20 & 21 April
**Ronnie O'Sullivan (ENG) (9)**	**13**
Darren Morgan (WAL) (8)	8
21, 22 & 23 April
**John Parrott (ENG) (5)**	**13**
Joe Swail (NIR)	11
22 & 23 April
David Roe (ENG) (13)	7
**Jimmy White (ENG) (4)**	**13**
20 & 21 April
**Gary Wilkinson (ENG)**	**13**
Terry Griffiths (WAL) (14)	9
22 & 23 April
**Nigel Bond (ENG) (11)**	**13**
Alan McManus (SCO) (6)	10
19 & 20 April
Mark Davis (ENG)	7
**Peter Ebdon (ENG) (10)**	**13**
21, 22 & 23 April
Willie Thorne (ENG) (15)	7
**Andy Hicks (ENG)**	**13**

**Quarter-finals**; Best of 25 frames
24 & 25 April
**Stephen Hendry (SCO) (1)**	**13**
Ronnie O'Sullivan (ENG) (9)	8
24 & 25 April
John Parrott (ENG) (5)	11
**Jimmy White (ENG) (4)**	**13**
24 & 25 April
Gary Wilkinson (ENG)	7
**Nigel Bond (ENG) (11)**	**13**
24 & 25 April
Peter Ebdon (ENG) (10)	8
**Andy Hicks (ENG)**	**13**

**Semi-finals**; Best of 31 frames
26, 27 & 28 April
**Stephen Hendry (SCO) (1)**	**16**
Jimmy White (ENG) (4)	12
26, 27 & 28 April
**Nigel Bond (ENG) (11)**	**16**
Andy Hicks (ENG)	11

**Final**; Best of 35 frames
29 & 30 April
**Stephen Hendry (SCO) (1)**	**18**
Nigel Bond (ENG) (11)	9

=== Final: frame scores ===
Final: (Best of 35 frames) Crucible Theatre, Sheffield, 29 & 30 April 1995; Referee: John Street
**Stephen Hendry (SCO)** (1)				**18**–9			Nigel Bond (ENG) (11)			
Session 1: 3–4
Frame	1	2	3	4	5	6	7	8	9	10
Hendry	**68**^{†} (61)	42	29	0	**72**^{†} (72)	4	**105**^{†} (101)	N/A	N/A	N/A
Bond	20	**87**^{†} (57)	**74**^{†}	**81**^{†} (77)	8	**76**^{†}	0	N/A	N/A	N/A
Session 2: 8–1 (11–5)
Frame	1	2	3	4	5	6	7	8	9	10
Hendry	**77**^{†}	1	**65**^{†} (60)	**90**^{†} (81)	**70**^{†} (70)	**74**^{†} (63)	**124**^{†} (124)	**70**^{†} (60)	**84**^{†} (84)	N/A
Bond	7	**85**^{†} (68)	32	1	31	13	1	25	0	N/A
Session 3: 5–3 (16–8)
Frame	1	2	3	4	5	6	7	8	9	10
Hendry	**75**^{†} (75)	**115**^{†} (53)	**74**^{†}	14	59 (59)	44	**76**^{†} (71)	**83**^{†} (83)	N/A	N/A
Bond	9	9	41	**63**^{†} (52)	**73**^{†}	**63**^{†}	19	0	N/A	N/A
Session 4: 2–1 (**18**–9)
Frame	1	2	3	4	5	6	7	8	9	10
Hendry	**92**^{†} (92)	0	**103**^{†} (103)	N/A	N/A	N/A	N/A	N/A	N/A	N/A
Bond	36	**135**^{†} (111)	28	N/A	N/A	N/A	N/A	N/A	N/A	N/A
124				Highest break			111			
3				Century breaks			1			
17				50+ breaks			5			
Stephen Hendry wins the 1995 World Snooker Championship; Breaks over 50 are shown in parentheses. † = Winner of frame

== Qualifying results ==
Eight qualifying rounds were played.

=== Rounds 1–4 ===
Results for rounds 1 to 4 are shown below.

Round 1 Best of 9 frames
Joe Jogia (ENG)	5
Edvard Matthiasson (ISL)	3
James O'Sullivan (ENG)	5
Paul Thomerson (ENG)	2
John Leahy (IRL)	5
Graham Francis (ENG)	0
Jason Greaves (ENG)	w/o
Ashot Potikyan (RUS)	w/d
Steve Day (ENG)	5
Wilfred Dijkstra (NED)	4
Chris O'Sullivan (ENG)	5
Steven de Baets (BEL)	0
Stephen Popplewell (ENG)	5
Robert Grenville-Smith (ENG)	2
Mike Nixon (ENG)	5
David Thompson (ENG)	3
Richard Somauroo (MUS)	5
Tony Brown (ENG)	2
Johan van Goetham (BEL)	5
Scott Rigg (ENG)	1
Lee Walker (WAL)	5
David Mole (ENG)	2
Matthew Farrant (WAL)	5
Stephen Ormerod (ENG)	4
Matthew Stevens (WAL)	5
Tom Bell (ENG)	0
Damian Massey (ENG)	5
Ahmed Osman (BEL)	2
Elliott Clark (ENG)	5
James Linehan (IRL)	3
Andrew Grieve (ENG)	5
Stephen Waldron (ENG)	4
Craig Duffy (AUS)	5
Damon Zeid (ENG)	4
Bjorn Haneveer (BEL)	5
Russell Gough (ENG)	1
Declan Hughes (NIR)	5
Mark Colmer (ENG)	0
Hugh Abernethy (SCO)	5
David Athorn (ENG)	4
Andrew Peters (WAL)	5
Del Smith (ENG)	1
Justyn Barnes (ENG)	5
Mark Canovan (NZL)	3
Patrick Wallace (NIR)	5
Andrew Alexandrou (ENG)	0
Stephen Kershaw (ENG)	5
Paul Thornley (CAN)	1
Wayne Brown (ENG)	5
Andreas Ahmed (ENG)	2
Stefan van der Borght (BEL)	5
Julian Mills (ENG)	4
Graham Horne (SCO)	5
Andrew Radford (ENG)	1
Mark Fenton (WAL)	w/o
Shazi Khan (ENG)	w/d
Dean Bracey (ENG)	5
Chris Carpenter (ENG)	4
Iain Trimble (ENG)	w/o
Ben Said Karim (FRA)	w/d
Nick Segal (ENG)	5
Chris Flight (ENG)	4
Scott Cooney (ENG)	5
Darren Shaw (ENG)	2
Mario Wehrmann (NED)	5
Rogelio Esteiro (ENG)	0
Jimmy Singh (ENG)	5
David Sharpe (ENG)	0
Colm Gilcreest (IRL)	5
Huseyin Hursid (TUR)	0
Darren Paris (ENG)	w/o
Nut Wiangchai (THA)	w/d
Chris Barnard (ENG)	5
Ryan Michael (ENG)	4
Tim Parry (ENG)	5
Craig Glanville (ENG)	4
Eddie Barker (ENG)	5
Richard Batty (ENG)	2
Andrew Milliard (ENG)	5
Alex Coutts (SCO)	1
Mark Cackett (ENG)	5
Glenn Stevenson (ENG)	4
Raymon Fabrie (NED)	5
Paul Hurren (ENG)	0
Jamie Moreland (ENG)	5
Neil Wood (ENG)	3
Vipul Patel (ENG)	5
Daniele Zagaroli (ITA)	4
Brett Patmore (ENG)	5
Stephen Jamieson (ENG)	0
Neal Jones (ENG)	5
Simon Smith (ENG)	1
Andy Neck (ENG)	5
Mark Ganderton (ENG)	4
Nick Spelman (ENG)	w/o
Brian Smits (NED)	w/d
Graeme Dott (SCO)	5
Jason Curtis (ENG)	2
Steve Gough (ENG)	5
Paul O'Donoghue (IRL)	4
Matt Bayley (ENG)	5
Luke Heard (ENG)	2
Raj Sharma (ENG)	w/o
John Clouden (ENG)	w/d
Mark Miller (ENG)	5
Craig Barber (ENG)	1
Gareth Atkins (ENG)	5
Jeffrey Moore (ENG)	0
Gary Irvine (NIR)	w/o
Kevin Johnstone (ENG)	w/d
Kieran McMahon (NIR)	5
Steven van Osselaer (BEL)	2
Paul Dawson (ENG)	5
Chris McGee (ENG)	3
Matt Bailey (ENG)	w/o
Liew Kitt Fatt (MYS)	w/d
Paul Clarke (ENG)	5
Richard Alford (ENG)	0
Kamal Jit Singh (ENG)	5
Robert Thallon (SCO)	0
Tai Pichit (THA)	5
Mark Whatley (ENG)	3
Martin Lee (ENG)	w/o
Roger Fransens (BEL)	w/d
Evan Munro (SCO)	5
Alex Peart (JAM)	0
Kevin Smith (ENG)	5
Mario Morra (CAN)	3
Derek Dunkling (ENG)	5
John Herbert (WAL)	3
Adrian Gunnell (ENG)	5
Peter Bullen (BEL)	2
Geoff Dunn (SCO)	5
Darren Skinner (ENG)	0
Alfie Burden (ENG)	5
Bernard Bennett (ENG)	0
Paul Sweeny (ENG)	5
Andrew Duff (SCO)	1
Matthew McGrotty (ENG)	5
Andrew Highfield (ENG)	0
Marc Devon (ENG)	5
Gary Kwok (HKG)	1
Johangir Khan (ENG)	5
Anthony Bridge (ENG)	3

Round 2 Best of 9 frames
Lee Walters (ENG)	5
Colin Kelly (ENG)	4
Steve Cook (ENG)	5
Gary Peters (WAL)	1
Martin Dziewialtowski (SCO)	5
Richard Culham (ENG)	3
Tim Bailey (ENG)	5
Nick S. Jones (WAL)	0
Craig Harrison (ENG)	5
Stephen Taylor (ENG)	2
Andrew Atkinson (ENG)	5
Sergio Beggiato (ENG)	4
Martin O'Neill (NIR)	5
Neil Selman (ENG)	0
Darren Lennox (IRL)	5
Jack Fitzmaurice (ENG)	0
Michael Judge (IRL)	5
Jayson Morris (ENG)	1
Graham Stevens (ENG)	5
Dean Venables (ENG)	2
Paul Cavney (ENG)	5
John Bayliss (ENG)	0
Roger Leighton (ENG)	5
John Manley (ENG)	2
Mario Geudens (BEL)	5
Joe Canny (IRL)	2
Simon Morris (ENG)	5
Alan Edmonds (ENG)	4
Mukesh Parmar (ENG)	5
Tim Dunphy (IRL)	1
Philip Seaton (ENG)	5
Lee Grant (ENG)	2
Matt Wilson (ENG)	5
Hassan Vaizie (ENG)	2
Nic Barrow (ENG)	5
Matthew Spade (ENG)	2
Gareth Chilcott (WAL)	5
Peter McCullagh (ENG)	3
Richard Wheelhouse (ENG)	5
Stuart Mann (ENG)	2
Robin Hull (FIN)	w/o
Jason Scott (ENG)	w/d
Shawn Budd (AUS)	5
Eddie Lott (ENG)	3
Darren Hackeson (ENG)	w/o
Hitesh Lakhani (ENG)	w/d
Steve Russell (ENG)	5
Norman MacLachlan (SCO)	2
Ian Williamson (ENG)	5
Anthony Buckley (ENG)	4
Carl Waters (ENG)	w/o
Steven Evans (ENG)	w/d
Stuart Parnell (ENG)	5
Alfonso Bellusci (ENG)	2
Amrik Cheema (IND)	5
Patrick Delsemme (BEL)	2
Stuart Pettman (ENG)	5
Jonathan Bagley (ENG)	4
Bradley Jones (ENG)	w/o
Louis Fazekas (CAN)	w/d
Leigh Griffin (ENG)	5
Mario Fernandez (IRL)	4
Steven Archer (ENG)	5
Mark O'Sullivan (IRL)	3
Sam Chong (MYS)	5
John Lardner (SCO)	3
Philip Williams (WAL)	5
Paul Medati (ENG)	1
Alex Borg (MLT)	5
Anthony Halpin (ENG)	3
Andrew Essilfie (ENG)	5
Scott Bigham (SCO)	2
Eddie Manning (ENG)	5
Richard King (ENG)	2
Alan Trigg (ENG)	5
Andrew Photiou (ENG)	2
Craig Bradshaw (ENG)	5
Will Jerram (ENG)	3
Alistair Fleming (SCO)	5
Murdo MacLeod (SCO)	4
Paul Davison (ENG)	5
Michael O'Sullivan (ENG)	3
Jason Pegram (ENG)	5
Roy Bigg (ENG)	3
Ian Bullimore (ENG)	5
Pat Horne (ENG)	2
Wayne Rendle (ENG)	5
Gerry Jones (IRL)	3
Gary Lees (ENG)	5
Grant Peabody (ENG)	1
Paul Wykes (ENG)	5
Kevin Brown (ENG)	3
Wayne Saidler (ENG)	5
Leigh Robinson (ENG)	4
Joe O'Boye (IRL)	5
David Blakey (ENG)	4
Darren Limburg (ENG)	5
Ray Edmonds (ENG)	4
Ian Hurdman (ENG)	5
John Dunning (ENG)	1
Justin Buckingham (ENG)	5
Robert Foxall (ENG)	1
David Singh (IND)	5
Robert Chapman (ENG)	1
Mark Williams (ENG)	5
Karl Townsend (ENG)	3
Anthony Taylor (ENG)	5
Richy McDonald (SCO)	4
Karl Burrows (ENG)	5
James Vicarey (ENG)	3
Steve Whalley (ENG)	5
Lyndon Smith (ENG)	3
Steve Mifsud (AUS)	0
Joe Jogia (ENG)	5
Wayne Lloyd (WAL)	5
James O'Sullivan (ENG)	3
Paddy Browne (IRL)	5
John Leahy (IRL)	2
Michael Duffy (NIR)	4
Jason Greaves (ENG)	5
Rex Williams (ENG)	5
Steve Day (ENG)	4
Paul Watchorn (IRL)	4
Chris O'Sullivan (ENG)	5
David Coles (ENG)	3
Stephen Popplewell (ENG)	5
Danny Murphy (ENG)	4
Mike Nixon (ENG)	5
Allison Fisher (ENG)	5
Richard Somauroo (MUS)	2
Ian Sargeant (WAL)	5
Johan van Goetham (BEL)	2
Steve Elliott (ENG)	2
Lee Walker (WAL)	5
Jason Smith (ENG)	w/d
Matthew Farrant (WAL)	w/o
Barry Pinches (ENG)	5
Matthew Stevens (WAL)	4
Sean Lynskey (ENG)	5
Damian Massey (ENG)	0
David Grimwood (ENG)	5
Elliott Clark (ENG)	4
Steve Ventham (ENG)	0
Andrew Grieve (ENG)	5
Gerard Greene (NIR)	5
Craig Duffy (AUS)	2
Anton Bishop (ENG)	5
Bjorn Haneveer (BEL)	3
Nick Marsh (ENG)	5
Declan Hughes (NIR)	4
Neil Mosley (ENG)	3
Hugh Abernethy (SCO)	5
Mark Gray (ENG)	5
Andrew Peters (WAL)	4
Neil Tomkins (WAL)	5
Justyn Barnes (ENG)	4
Craig MacGillivray (SCO)	3
Patrick Wallace (NIR)	5
Garry Baldrey (ENG)	2
Stephen Kershaw (ENG)	5
David Wilson (ENG)	5
Wayne Brown (ENG)	4
Graham MacDonald (ENG)	2
Stefan van der Borght (BEL)	5
Jason Dunworth (ENG)	3
Graham Horne (SCO)	5
Nick Pearce (ENG)	0
Mark Fenton (WAL)	5
Gary Ponting (ENG)	5
Dean Bracey (ENG)	2
Steve Harrison (ENG)	5
Iain Trimble (ENG)	2
Joe Perry (ENG)	5
Nick Segal (ENG)	3
Graham Cripsey (ENG)	3
Scott Cooney (ENG)	5
Jeff Cundy (ENG)	5
Mario Wehrmann (NED)	2
Graham Fisken (ENG)	2
Jimmy Singh (ENG)	5
Steve Duggan (ENG)	3
Colm Gilcreest (IRL)	5
Steve Prest (ENG)	5
Darren Paris (ENG)	4
Cary Kikis (ENG)	w/d
Chris Barnard (ENG)	w/o
Joe Delaney (IRL)	4
Tim Parry (ENG)	5
Mike Smith (ENG)	5
Eddie Barker (ENG)	1
David Rippon (ENG)	0
Andrew Milliard (ENG)	5
Anthony O'Connor (IRL)	5
Mark Cackett (ENG)	1
Simon Parker (ENG)	3
Raymon Fabrie (NED)	5
Shane Haines (ENG)	5
Jamie Moreland (ENG)	2
Bob Harris (ENG)	w/d
Vipul Patel (ENG)	w/o
John Burns (ENG)	4
Brett Patmore (ENG)	5
Jamie Bodle (ENG)	5
Neal Jones (ENG)	4
Daryl Peach (ENG)	5
Andy Neck (ENG)	3
Sefton Payne (ENG)	5
Nick Spelman (ENG)	3
Micky Roughan (IRL)	5
Graeme Dott (SCO)	2
Julian Goodyear (ENG)	5
Steve Gough (ENG)	3
Marcus Campbell (SCO)	5
Matt Bayley (ENG)	2
Jason Walton (ENG)	5
Raj Sharma (ENG)	0
Jimmy Long (IRL)	3
Mark Miller (ENG)	5
Peter Gilchrist (ENG)	5
Gareth Atkins (ENG)	1
Ian McCulloch (ENG)	5
Gary Irvine (NIR)	4
Robert Marshall (ENG)	4
Kieran McMahon (NIR)	5
Andrew Hannah (ENG)	5
Paul Dawson (ENG)	2
Iwan Jones (WAL)	3
Matt Bailey (ENG)	5
Dermot McGlinchey (NIR)	4
Paul Clarke (ENG)	5
Paul S. Davison (ENG)	5
Kamal Jit Singh (ENG)	2
Adrian Rosa (ENG)	1
Tai Pichit (THA)	5
Mike Dunn (ENG)	5
Martin Lee (ENG)	4
Stuart Reardon (ENG)	5
Evan Munro (SCO)	1
Jamie Rous (ENG)	5
Kevin Smith (ENG)	4
Mehmet Husnu (CYP)	5
Derek Dunkling (ENG)	3
John Shilton (ENG)	2
Adrian Gunnell (ENG)	5
David McLellan (SCO)	5
Geoff Dunn (SCO)	1
Noppadon Noppachorn (THA)	5
Alfie Burden (ENG)	0
Suriya Suwannasingh (THA)	5
Paul Sweeny (ENG)	4
Mick Fisher (ENG)	1
Matthew McGrotty (ENG)	5
Mike Leach (ENG)	5
Marc Devon (ENG)	2
Bjorn L'Orange (NOR)	5
Johangir Khan (ENG)	1

Round 3 Best of 9 frames
Lee Walters (ENG)	5
Steve Cook (ENG)	1
Martin Dziewialtowski (SCO)	5
Tim Bailey (ENG)	3
Craig Harrison (ENG)	5
Andrew Atkinson (ENG)	4
Martin O'Neill (NIR)	5
Darren Lennox (IRL)	1
Michael Judge (IRL)	5
Graham Stevens (ENG)	1
Paul Cavney (ENG)	5
Roger Leighton (ENG)	2
Mario Geudens (BEL)	5
Simon Morris (ENG)	2
Mukesh Parmar (ENG)	5
Philip Seaton (ENG)	2
Matt Wilson (ENG)	5
Nic Barrow (ENG)	4
Gareth Chilcott (WAL)	5
Richard Wheelhouse (ENG)	4
Robin Hull (FIN)	5
Shawn Budd (AUS)	4
Darren Hackeson (ENG)	5
Steve Russell (ENG)	2
Ian Williamson (ENG)	5
Carl Waters (ENG)	3
Stuart Parnell (ENG)	5
Amrik Cheema (IND)	0
Stuart Pettman (ENG)	5
Bradley Jones (ENG)	3
Leigh Griffin (ENG)	5
Steven Archer (ENG)	3
Sam Chong (MYS)	5
Philip Williams (WAL)	1
Alex Borg (MLT)	5
Andrew Essilfie (ENG)	1
Eddie Manning (ENG)	5
Alan Trigg (ENG)	3
Craig Bradshaw (ENG)	5
Alistair Fleming (SCO)	4
Paul Davison (ENG)	5
Jason Pegram (ENG)	2
Ian Bullimore (ENG)	5
Wayne Rendle (ENG)	1
Gary Lees (ENG)	5
Paul Wykes (ENG)	3
Wayne Saidler (ENG)	5
Joe O'Boye (IRL)	4
Darren Limburg (ENG)	5
Ian Hurdman (ENG)	3
Justin Buckingham (ENG)	5
David Singh (IND)	3
Mark Williams (ENG)	5
Anthony Taylor (ENG)	3
Karl Burrows (ENG)	5
Steve Whalley (ENG)	1
Joe Jogia (ENG)	5
Wayne Lloyd (WAL)	4
Paddy Browne (IRL)	5
Jason Greaves (ENG)	4
Rex Williams (ENG)	5
Chris O'Sullivan (ENG)	2
Stephen Popplewell (ENG)	5
Mike Nixon (ENG)	2
Allison Fisher (ENG)	5
Ian Sargeant (WAL)	3
Lee Walker (WAL)	5
Matthew Farrant (WAL)	0
Barry Pinches (ENG)	5
Sean Lynskey (ENG)	3
David Grimwood (ENG)	5
Andrew Grieve (ENG)	2
Gerard Greene (NIR)	5
Anton Bishop (ENG)	0
Nick Marsh (ENG)	5
Hugh Abernethy (SCO)	4
Mark Gray (ENG)	5
Neil Tomkins (WAL)	3
Patrick Wallace (NIR)	5
Stephen Kershaw (ENG)	3
David Wilson (ENG)	5
Stefan van der Borght (BEL)	1
Graham Horne (SCO)	5
Mark Fenton (WAL)	0
Gary Ponting (ENG)	5
Steve Harrison (ENG)	0
Joe Perry (ENG)	5
Scott Cooney (ENG)	2
Jeff Cundy (ENG)	5
Jimmy Singh (ENG)	1
Colm Gilcreest (IRL)	5
Steve Prest (ENG)	4
Chris Barnard (ENG)	5
Tim Parry (ENG)	2
Mike Smith (ENG)	5
Andrew Milliard (ENG)	4
Anthony O'Connor (IRL)	5
Raymon Fabrie (NED)	3
Shane Haines (ENG)	5
Vipul Patel (ENG)	1
Brett Patmore (ENG)	5
Jamie Bodle (ENG)	4
Daryl Peach (ENG)	5
Sefton Payne (ENG)	2
Micky Roughan (IRL)	5
Julian Goodyear (ENG)	3
Marcus Campbell (SCO)	5
Jason Walton (ENG)	3
Mark Miller (ENG)	5
Peter Gilchrist (ENG)	2
Ian McCulloch (ENG)	5
Kieran McMahon (NIR)	0
Andrew Hannah (ENG)	5
Matt Bailey (ENG)	1
Paul Clarke (ENG)	5
Paul S. Davison (ENG)	2
Tai Pichit (THA)	5
Mike Dunn (ENG)	2
Stuart Reardon (ENG)	5
Jamie Rous (ENG)	1
Mehmet Husnu (CYP)	5
Adrian Gunnell (ENG)	4
David McLellan (SCO)	5
Noppadon Noppachorn (THA)	2
Suriya Suwannasingh (THA)	5
Matthew McGrotty (ENG)	1
Mike Leach (ENG)	5
Bjorn L'Orange (NOR)	1

Round 4 Best of 19 frames
Stefan Mazrocis (ENG)	10
Lee Walters (ENG)	1
Jason Weston (ENG)	8
Martin Dziewialtowski (SCO)	10
Scott MacFarlane (SCO)	10
Craig Harrison (ENG)	2
Dominic Dale (WAL)	8
Martin O'Neill (NIR)	10
Pat Kenny (ENG)	6
Michael Judge (IRL)	10
Andrew Cairns (ENG)	6
Paul Cavney (ENG)	10
Joe Grech (MLT)	7
Mario Geudens (BEL)	10
Karl Payne (ENG)	10
Mukesh Parmar (ENG)	9
Bob Chaperon (CAN)	w/d
Matt Wilson (ENG)	w/o
Anthony Harris (ENG)	10
Gareth Chilcott (WAL)	9
Ian Graham (ENG)	5
Robin Hull (FIN)	10
Paul Gibson (ENG)	5
Darren Hackeson (ENG)	10
Oliver King (ENG)	10
Ian Williamson (ENG)	3
Lee Richardson (ENG)	10
Stuart Parnell (ENG)	4
Tony Meo (ENG)	10
Stuart Pettman (ENG)	8
Troy Shaw (ENG)	3
Leigh Griffin (ENG)	10
Craig Edwards (ENG)	9
Sam Chong (MYS)	10
Chris Scanlon (ENG)	10
Alex Borg (MLT)	5
Shokat Ali (PAK)	9
Eddie Manning (ENG)	10
Mark King (ENG)	10
Craig Bradshaw (ENG)	4
Jimmy Michie (ENG)	10
Paul Davison (ENG)	9
Steve Judd (ENG)	10
Ian Bullimore (ENG)	9
Peter Lines (ENG)	6
Gary Lees (ENG)	10
Dylan Leary (NIR)	10
Wayne Saidler (ENG)	9
Ken Owers (ENG)	10
Darren Limburg (ENG)	8
Nick Fruin (ENG)	8
Justin Buckingham (ENG)	10
Peter Daubney (ENG)	10
Mark Williams (ENG)	4
Stephen O'Connor (IRL)	10
Karl Burrows (ENG)	1
Robby Foldvari (AUS)	5
Joe Jogia (ENG)	10
Surinder Gill (ENG)	10
Paddy Browne (IRL)	3
Nick Walker (ENG)	10
Rex Williams (ENG)	3
Karl Broughton (ENG)	10
Stephen Popplewell (ENG)	5
Roger Garrett (ENG)	10
Allison Fisher (ENG)	4
Darryn Walker (ENG)	10
Lee Walker (WAL)	8
David McDonnell (IRL)	5
Barry Pinches (ENG)	10
Darren Clarke (ENG)	10
David Grimwood (ENG)	0
Jamie Woodman (ENG)	10
Gerard Greene (NIR)	3
Nick Dyson (ENG)	10
Nick Marsh (ENG)	6
Shaun Mellish (ENG)	6
Mark Gray (ENG)	10
Ian Brumby (ENG)	10
Patrick Wallace (NIR)	2
Jamie Burnett (SCO)	10
David Wilson (ENG)	6
Steve Meakin (ENG)	3
Graham Horne (SCO)	10
Chris Small (SCO)	10
Gary Ponting (ENG)	3
Colin Morton (ENG)	10
Joe Perry (ENG)	3
John Giles (ENG)	3
Jeff Cundy (ENG)	10
John Read (ENG)	10
Colm Gilcreest (IRL)	8
Jason Wallace (ENG)	10
Chris Barnard (ENG)	0
David Taylor (ENG)	10
Mike Smith (ENG)	4
Mark Flowerdew (ENG)	10
Anthony O'Connor (IRL)	3
Eugene Hughes (IRL)	10
Shane Haines (ENG)	8
Jack McLaughlin (NIR)	10
Brett Patmore (ENG)	4
Mark Davis (ENG)	10
Daryl Peach (ENG)	4
Antony Bolsover (ENG)	10
Micky Roughan (IRL)	7
Yasin Merchant (IND)	9
Marcus Campbell (SCO)	10
Mark Rowing (ENG)	10
Mark Miller (ENG)	3
Brian Rowswell (ENG)	5
Ian McCulloch (ENG)	10
Euan Henderson (SCO)	10
Andrew Hannah (ENG)	5
Barry West (ENG)	10
Paul Clarke (ENG)	8
Warren King (AUS)	0
Tai Pichit (THA)	10
Sean Lanigan (ENG)	5
Stuart Reardon (ENG)	10
Jim Chambers (ENG)	8
Mehmet Husnu (CYP)	10
Matthew Couch (ENG)	10
David McLellan (SCO)	5
Terry Murphy (NIR)	10
Suriya Suwannasingh (THA)	6
Sean Storey (ENG)	10
Mike Leach (ENG)	8

Note: w/o = walkover; w/d = withdrawn

=== Rounds 5–8 ===
Results for rounds 5 to 8 are shown below.

Round 5 Best of 19 frames
Stefan Mazrocis (ENG)	10
Martin Dziewialtowski (SCO)	3
Scott MacFarlane (SCO)	10
Martin O'Neill (NIR)	8
Michael Judge (IRL)	9
Paul Cavney (ENG)	10
Mario Geudens (BEL)	10
Karl Payne (ENG)	5
Matt Wilson (ENG)	10
Anthony Harris (ENG)	3
Robin Hull (FIN)	10
Darren Hackeson (ENG)	3
Oliver King (ENG)	5
Lee Richardson (ENG)	10
Tony Meo (ENG)	10
Leigh Griffin (ENG)	8
Sam Chong (MYS)	10
Chris Scanlon (ENG)	8
Eddie Manning (ENG)	5
Mark King (ENG)	10
Jimmy Michie (ENG)	5
Steve Judd (ENG)	10
Gary Lees (ENG)	10
Dylan Leary (NIR)	8
Ken Owers (ENG)	9
Justin Buckingham (ENG)	10
Peter Daubney (ENG)	6
Stephen O'Connor (IRL)	10
Joe Jogia (ENG)	10
Surinder Gill (ENG)	7
Nick Walker (ENG)	10
Karl Broughton (ENG)	9
Roger Garrett (ENG)	6
Darryn Walker (ENG)	10
Barry Pinches (ENG)	10
Darren Clarke (ENG)	3
Jamie Woodman (ENG)	10
Nick Dyson (ENG)	4
Mark Gray (ENG)	8
Ian Brumby (ENG)	10
Jamie Burnett (SCO)	10
Graham Horne (SCO)	8
Chris Small (SCO)	10
Colin Morton (ENG)	5
Jeff Cundy (ENG)	7
John Read (ENG)	10
Jason Wallace (ENG)	10
David Taylor (ENG)	6
Mark Flowerdew (ENG)	10
Eugene Hughes (IRL)	3
Jack McLaughlin (NIR)	4
Mark Davis (ENG)	10
Antony Bolsover (ENG)	4
Marcus Campbell (SCO)	10
Mark Rowing (ENG)	10
Ian McCulloch (ENG)	9
Euan Henderson (SCO)	10
Barry West (ENG)	3
Tai Pichit (THA)	10
Stuart Reardon (ENG)	8
Mehmet Husnu (CYP)	6
Matthew Couch (ENG)	10
Terry Murphy (NIR)	10
Sean Storey (ENG)	4

Round 6 Best of 19 frames
Jason Prince (NIR)	9
Stefan Mazrocis (ENG)	10
Silvino Francisco (ZAF)	9
Scott MacFarlane (SCO)	10
Les Dodd (ENG)	9
Paul Cavney (ENG)	10
Nick Terry (ENG)	10
Mario Geudens (BEL)	6
David Finbow (ENG)	10
Matt Wilson (ENG)	9
Wayne Jones (WAL)	4
Robin Hull (FIN)	10
Anthony Davies (WAL)	10
Lee Richardson (ENG)	4
Jonathan Birch (ENG)	4
Tony Meo (ENG)	10
Tony Chappel (WAL)	10
Sam Chong (MYS)	1
Paul Davies (WAL)	10
Mark King (ENG)	8
Paul McPhillips (SCO)	10
Steve Judd (ENG)	6
Nigel Gilbert (ENG)	10
Gary Lees (ENG)	2
Tony Jones (ENG)	9
Justin Buckingham (ENG)	10
Billy Snaddon (SCO)	10
Stephen O'Connor (IRL)	7
Peter Francisco (ZAF)	10
Joe Jogia (ENG)	4
Anthony Hamilton (ENG)	10
Nick Walker (ENG)	6
Eddie Charlton (AUS)	10
Darryn Walker (ENG)	9
Stephen Murphy (IRL)	6
Barry Pinches (ENG)	10
Cliff Thorburn (CAN)	9
Jamie Woodman (ENG)	10
Steve Newbury (WAL)	8
Ian Brumby (ENG)	10
Stephen Lee (ENG)	10
Jamie Burnett (SCO)	8
Drew Henry (SCO)	9
Chris Small (SCO)	10
John Higgins (SCO)	10
John Read (ENG)	5
Jim Wych (CAN)	8
Jason Wallace (ENG)	10
Mark Williams (WAL)	10
Mark Flowerdew (ENG)	5
Danny Fowler (ENG)	2
Mark Davis (ENG)	10
Mark Johnston-Allen (ENG)	7
Marcus Campbell (SCO)	10
Rod Lawler (ENG)	10
Mark Rowing (ENG)	6
Fergal O'Brien (IRL)	5
Euan Henderson (SCO)	10
Alex Higgins (NIR)	5
Tai Pichit (THA)	10
Joe Johnson (ENG)	10
Matthew Couch (ENG)	5
Andy Hicks (ENG)	10
Terry Murphy (NIR)	7

Round 7 Best of 19 frames
Stefan Mazrocis (ENG)	10
Scott MacFarlane (SCO)	7
Paul Cavney (ENG)	10
Nick Terry (ENG)	8
David Finbow (ENG)	10
Robin Hull (FIN)	6
Anthony Davies (WAL)	10
Tony Meo (ENG)	4
Tony Chappel (WAL)	10
Paul Davies (WAL)	6
Paul McPhillips (SCO)	8
Nigel Gilbert (ENG)	10
Justin Buckingham (ENG)	5
Billy Snaddon (SCO)	10
Peter Francisco (ZAF)	10
Anthony Hamilton (ENG)	6
Eddie Charlton (AUS)	9
Barry Pinches (ENG)	10
Jamie Woodman (ENG)	10
Ian Brumby (ENG)	4
Stephen Lee (ENG)	10
Chris Small (SCO)	8
John Higgins (SCO)	10
Jason Wallace (ENG)	7
Mark Williams (WAL)	3
Mark Davis (ENG)	10
Marcus Campbell (SCO)	6
Rod Lawler (ENG)	10
Euan Henderson (SCO)	6
Tai Pichit (THA)	10
Joe Johnson (ENG)	2
Andy Hicks (ENG)	10

Round 8 Best of 19 frames
Mark Bennett (WAL)	6
Stefan Mazrocis (ENG)	10
Neal Foulds (ENG)	9
Paul Cavney (ENG)	10
Dave Harold (ENG)	10
David Finbow (ENG)	6
Dennis Taylor (NIR)	2
Anthony Davies (WAL)	10
Brian Morgan (ENG)	10
Tony Chappel (WAL)	4
Steve James (ENG)	6
Nigel Gilbert (ENG)	10
Doug Mountjoy (WAL)	4
Billy Snaddon (SCO)	10
Mick Price (ENG)	8
Peter Francisco (ZAF)	10
Gary Wilkinson (ENG)	10
Barry Pinches (ENG)	3
Alain Robidoux (CAN)	10
Jamie Woodman (ENG)	3
Tony Knowles (ENG)	4
Stephen Lee (ENG)	10
Jason Ferguson (ENG)	8
John Higgins (SCO)	10
Dene O'Kane (NZL)	4
Mark Davis (ENG)	10
Dean Reynolds (ENG)	6
Rod Lawler (ENG)	10
Mike Hallett (ENG)	8
Tai Pichit (THA)	10
Martin Clark (ENG)	9
Andy Hicks (ENG)	10

== Century breaks ==
A total of 30 century breaks were made during the main stage of the tournament. The highest was a maximum break by Stephen Hendry, the third in the history of the World Championship. Hendry's 12 centuries in the tournament beat the record of 10 set by Joe Davis in 1946 and equalled his own record for a ranking event, set at the 1994 UK Championship.

- 147, 133, 128, 124, 121, 119, 114, 105, 103, 103, 101, 100 – Stephen Hendry
- 136, 117, 100 – Andy Hicks
- 129, 123, 115, 110 – John Parrott
- 117 – Tony Drago
- 115, 111, 101 – Nigel Bond
- 112, 111 – Ronnie O'Sullivan
- 108, 107 – Peter Ebdon
- 103 – Dave Harold
- 100 – Alan McManus
- 100 – Darren Morgan
