= 1992 Asian Open =

Asian Open
Tournament information
- Dates: 14–19 January 1992
- Venue: Imperial Queens Park Hotel
- City: Bangkok
- Country: Thailand
- Organisation: WPBSA
- Format: Ranking event
- Winner's share: £30,000

Final
- Champion: Steve Davis (ENG)
- Runner-up: Alan McManus (SCO)
- Score: 9–3

The 1992 Thai Sky/555 Asian Open was a professional ranking snooker tournament that took place between 14 and 19 January 1992 at the Imperial Queens Park Hotel in Bangkok, Thailand.

Steve Davis won the tournament by defeating Alan McManus 9–3 in the final. The defending champion Stephen Hendry was eliminated in the last 32 by Joe Swail.

== Main draw ==
Last 64; Best of 9 frames
(England) Steve Davis | 5
(England) Gary Lees | 3
(England) Tony Meo | 5
(England) Joe Johnson | 4
(Northern Ireland) Dennis Taylor | 5
(England) Sean Storey | 2
(Canada) Bob Chaperon | 5
(England) Nigel Gilbert | 2
(Canada) Alain Robidoux | 5
(England) David Taylor | 4
(Wales) Colin Roscoe | 5
(Wales) Cliff Wilson | 4
(Malta) Tony Drago | 5
(Republic of Ireland) Tony Kearney | 0
(England) Mike Hallett | 5
(England) Karl Broughton | 3
(England) Willie Thorne | 5
(Northern Ireland) Jason Prince | 2
(Republic of Ireland) Ken Doherty | 5
(Wales) Terry Griffiths | 3
(England) John Parrott | 5
(England) Jamie Woodman | 3
(Australia) Eddie Charlton | 5
(England) Mark Evans | 1
(New Zealand) Dene O'Kane | 5
(England) Jonathan Birch | 2
(England) Dean Reynolds | 5
(England) Karl Payne | 4
(England) Steve Campbell | 5
(England) Gary Wilkinson | 3
(England) Stuart Reardon | 5
(South Africa) Peter Francisco | 3
(Scotland) Alan McManus | 5
(Wales) Doug Mountjoy | 2
(Thailand) James Wattana | 5
(Wales) Darren Morgan | 4
(Wales) Mark Bennett | 5
(England) Mark Johnston-Allen | 4
(England) Neal Foulds | 5
(England) Paul Medati | 2
(England) Martin Clark | 5
(England) Martin Smith | 1
(South Africa) Silvino Francisco | 5
(England) Peter Ebdon | 3
(England) Mick Price | 5
(England) Jimmy White | 4
(England) Anthony Hamilton | 5
(England) Nigel Bond | 2
(Northern Ireland) Joe Swail | 5
(Wales) Wayne Jones | 2
(Scotland) Stephen Hendry | 5
(Wales) Tony Chappel | 2
(England) Tony Knowles | 5
(England) Sean Lynskey | 3
(England) Danny Fowler | 5
(England) Bill Oliver | 3
(England) John Read | 5
(England) John Virgo | 2
(England) Brian Morgan | 5
(England) Steve James | 4
(England) David Roe | 5
(England) Tony Jones | 2
(England) Peter Lines | 5
(Wales) Steve Newbury | 1

Last 32; Best of 9 frames
(England) Steve Davis | 5
(England) Tony Meo | 2
(Northern Ireland) Dennis Taylor | 5
(Canada) Bob Chaperon | 2
(Canada) Alain Robidoux | 5
(Wales) Colin Roscoe | 3
(Malta) Tony Drago | 5
(England) Mike Hallett | 2
(England) Willie Thorne | 5
(Republic of Ireland) Ken Doherty | 4
(England) John Parrott | 5
(Australia) Eddie Charlton | 3
(New Zealand) Dene O'Kane | 5
(England) Dean Reynolds | 3
(England) Steve Campbell | 5
(England) Stuart Reardon | 4
(Scotland) Alan McManus | 5
(Thailand) James Wattana | 3
(Wales) Mark Bennett | 5
(England) Neal Foulds | 3
(England) Martin Clark | 5
(South Africa) Silvino Francisco | 4
(England) Mick Price | 5
(England) Anthony Hamilton | 3
(Northern Ireland) Joe Swail | 5
(Scotland) Stephen Hendry | 0
(England) Tony Knowles | 5
(England) Danny Fowler | 2
(England) John Read | 5
(England) Brian Morgan | 3
(England) David Roe | 5
(England) Peter Lines | 2

Last 16; Best of 9 frames
(England) Steve Davis | 5
(Northern Ireland) Dennis Taylor | 0
(Canada) Alain Robidoux | 5
(Malta) Tony Drago | 2
(England) Willie Thorne | 5
(England) John Parrott | 3
(New Zealand) Dene O'Kane | 5
(England) Steve Campbell | 2
(Scotland) Alan McManus | 5
(Wales) Mark Bennett | 3
(England) Martin Clark | 5
(England) Mick Price | 3
(Northern Ireland) Joe Swail | 5
(England) Tony Knowles | 0
(England) John Read | 5
(England) David Roe | 3

Quarter-finals; Best of 9 frames
(England) Steve Davis | 5
(Canada) Alain Robidoux | 1
(England) Willie Thorne | 5
(New Zealand) Dene O'Kane | 1
(Scotland) Alan McManus | 5
(England) Martin Clark | 3
(Northern Ireland) Joe Swail | 5
(England) John Read | 0

Semi-finals; Best of 9 frames
(England) Steve Davis | 5
(England) Willie Thorne | 2
(Scotland) Alan McManus | 5
(Northern Ireland) Joe Swail | 3

Final; Best of 17 frames
(England) Steve Davis | 9
(Scotland) Alan McManus | 3
