= 1995 Welsh Open (snooker) =

1995 Regal Welsh Open
Tournament information
- Dates: 22–29 January 1995
- Venue: Newport Centre
- City: Newport
- Country: Wales
- Organisation: WPBSA
- Format: Ranking event
- Total prize fund: £196,400
- Winner's share: £32,500
- Highest break: Peter Ebdon (ENG) (135)

Final
- Champion: Steve Davis (ENG)
- Runner-up: John Higgins (SCO)
- Score: 9–3

The 1995 Welsh Open (officially the 1995 Regal Welsh Open) was a professional ranking snooker tournament that took place between 22 and 29 January 1995 at the Newport Centre in Newport, Wales.

Steve Davis was the defending champion, and successfully retained his title, winning the final 9–3 against John Higgins and as a result earned £32,500. This was the 28th and final ranking event he won. The highest break of the televised stage was 135 made by Peter Ebdon.

== Ranking points ==
Champion		3600
Runner-up		2700
Semi-final		2025
Quarter-final		1520
Last 16		1140
Last 32		855
Last 64	Unseeded	640
Last 64	Seeded	427

== Main draw ==
Last 64; Best of 9 frames
1	(England) Steve Davis	5
(England) Paul Cavney	0
19	(England) Dave Harold	5
53	(Wales) Tony Chappel	4
30	(England) Brian Morgan	2
58	(Wales) Mark Williams	5
13	(England) David Roe	3
37	(England) Joe Johnson	5
32	(Canada) Alain Robidoux	2
(England) Mark Flowerdew	5
7	(Republic of Ireland) Ken Doherty	4
(Republic of Ireland) Michael Judge	5
16	(Malta) Tony Drago	0
(England) Antony Bolsover	5
21	(England) Tony Knowles	1
(England) Jeff Cundy	5
10	(England) Peter Ebdon	5
(England) Troy Shaw	2
24	(Northern Ireland) Dennis Taylor	5
(Scotland) Graeme Dott	1
18	(England) Martin Clark	0
(England) John Read	5
8	(Wales) Darren Morgan	5
33	(England) Andy Hicks	2
12	(Northern Ireland) Joe Swail	5
56	(Canada) Jim Wych	2
29	(England) Dean Reynolds	2
63	(Republic of Ireland) Stephen Murphy	5
27	(England) Mick Price	5
(England) Matthew Couch	1
4	(England) Jimmy White	5
(England) Jason Weston	4
3	(Thailand) James Wattana	3
40	(England) Stephen Lee	5
20	(New Zealand) Dene O'Kane	4
51	(Scotland) John Higgins	5
22	(England) Gary Wilkinson	4
55	(Wales) Paul Davies	5
15	(England) Willie Thorne	5
59	(Scotland) Paul McPhillips	2
9	(England) Ronnie O'Sullivan	5
39	(Scotland) Drew Henry	4
23	(England) Mike Hallett	5
(England) Graham MacDonald	2
31	(Wales) Mark Bennett	3
35	(England) Anthony Hamilton	5
6	(Scotland) Alan McManus	5
44	(England) Mark Johnston-Allen	1
11	(England) Nigel Bond	0
(Scotland) Chris Small	5
17	(England) Steve James	3
61	(South Africa) Peter Francisco	5
5	(England) John Parrott	3
42	(Republic of Ireland) Fergal O'Brien	5
25	(England) Neal Foulds	5
(Northern Ireland) Terry Murphy	2
14	(Wales) Terry Griffiths	0
(England) Chris Scanlon	5
28	(England) Jason Ferguson	5
46	(England) Danny Fowler	0
26	(Wales) Doug Mountjoy	2
(England) Karl Payne	5
2	(Scotland) Stephen Hendry	5
57	(South Africa) Silvino Francisco	0

Last 32; Best of 9 frames
1	(England) Steve Davis	5
19	(England) Dave Harold	3
58	(Wales) Mark Williams	5
37	(England) Joe Johnson	3
(England) Mark Flowerdew	5
(Republic of Ireland) Michael Judge	4
(England) Antony Bolsover	5
(England) Jeff Cundy	3
10	(England) Peter Ebdon	5
24	(Northern Ireland) Dennis Taylor	4
(England) John Read	5
8	(Wales) Darren Morgan	3
12	(Northern Ireland) Joe Swail	5
63	(Republic of Ireland) Stephen Murphy	3
27	(England) Mick Price	5
4	(England) Jimmy White	4
40	(England) Stephen Lee	4
51	(Scotland) John Higgins	5
55	(Wales) Paul Davies	5
15	(England) Willie Thorne	4
9	(England) Ronnie O'Sullivan	5
23	(England) Mike Hallett	0
35	(England) Anthony Hamilton	5
6	(Scotland) Alan McManus	3
(Scotland) Chris Small	5
61	(South Africa) Peter Francisco	2
42	(Republic of Ireland) Fergal O'Brien	5
25	(England) Neal Foulds	1
(England) Chris Scanlon	5
28	(England) Jason Ferguson	2
(England) Karl Payne	2
2	(Scotland) Stephen Hendry	5

Last 16; Best of 9 frames
1	(England) Steve Davis	5
58	(Wales) Mark Williams	3
(England) Mark Flowerdew	5
(England) Antony Bolsover	3
10	(England) Peter Ebdon	5
(England) John Read	4
12	(Northern Ireland) Joe Swail	5
27	(England) Mick Price	2
51	(Scotland) John Higgins	5
55	(Wales) Paul Davies	2
9	(England) Ronnie O'Sullivan	5
35	(England) Anthony Hamilton	4
(Scotland) Chris Small	5
42	(Republic of Ireland) Fergal O'Brien	1
(England) Chris Scanlon	0
2	(Scotland) Stephen Hendry	5

Quarter-finals; Best of 9 frames
1	(England) Steve Davis	5
(England) Mark Flowerdew	3
10	(England) Peter Ebdon	5
12	(Northern Ireland) Joe Swail	4
51	(Scotland) John Higgins	5
9	(England) Ronnie O'Sullivan	4
(Scotland) Chris Small	5
2	(Scotland) Stephen Hendry	1

Semi-finals; Best of 11 frames
1	(England) Steve Davis	6
10	(England) Peter Ebdon	3
51	(Scotland) John Higgins	6
(Scotland) Chris Small	1

Final; Best of 17 frames
1	(England) Steve Davis	9
51	(Scotland) John Higgins	3

== Final ==
Final: Best of 19 frames. Referee: John Williams. Newport Centre, Newport, Wales, 29 January 1995
Steve Davis (1); England	9–3	John Higgins (51); Scotland
Afternoon: 62–10, 0–89 (89), 36–70, 79–28, 71–8, 95–0 (95), 32–85 (65), 85–17 (83); Evening: 66–58, 68–7 (63), 62–30
95	Highest break	89
0	Century breaks	0
3	50+ breaks	2
