= 1995 Grand Prix (snooker) =

Skoda Grand Prix
Tournament information
- Dates: 16–29 October 1995
- Venue: Crowtree Centre
- City: Sunderland
- Country: England
- Organisation: WPBSA
- Format: Ranking event
- Total prize fund: £330,000
- Winner's share: £60,000
- Highest break: Stephen Hendry (SCO) (138)

Final
- Champion: Stephen Hendry (SCO)
- Runner-up: John Higgins (SCO)
- Score: 9–5

The 1995 Skoda Grand Prix was a professional ranking snooker tournament that took place between 16 and 29 October 1995 at the Crowtree Centre in Sunderland, England.

Stephen Hendry defeated defending champion John Higgins 9–5 in a rather scrappy final.

== Prize fund ==
The breakdown of prize money for this year is shown below:

Winner: £60,000
Runner up: £32,000
Semi-finalists: £16,000
Quarter-finalists: £9,050
Last 16: £4,550
Last 32: £2,600
Last 64: £1,900

Stage one High Break: £3,600
Stage two High Break: £5,000

Total: £330,000

== Main draw ==
=== Top half ===
Last 64; Best of 9 frames
1	(Scotland) John Higgins	5
59	(England) Mark Davis	1
28	(England) Neal Foulds	5
34	(England) Mike Hallett	4
20	(Canada) Alain Robidoux	5
(England) Karl Broughton	2
12	(England) Nigel Bond	5
39	(Wales) Mark Williams	1
15	(Wales) Terry Griffiths	1
60	(Wales) Steve Newbury	5
21	(England) Mick Price	3
55	(Northern Ireland) Jason Prince	5
22	(England) Martin Clark	5
45	(Wales) Anthony Davies	5
8	(England) Jimmy White	5
(Malta) Alex Borg	0
4	(England) Ronnie O'Sullivan	2
(Northern Ireland) Michael Duffy	5
19	(Northern Ireland) Joe Swail	5
(England) Jeff Cundy	3
17	(England) Andy Hicks	5
40	(England) Rod Lawler	3
11	(England) Peter Ebdon	5
(England) Steve Ventham	2
10	(Republic of Ireland) Ken Doherty	5
(England) Matt Wilson	0
30	(England) Dean Reynolds	3
54	(England) Mark Flowerdew	5
27	(England) Brian Morgan	4
(England) Andrew Cairns	5
7	(Scotland) Alan McManus	5
(England) Chris Scanlon	0

Last 32; Best of 9 frames
1	(Scotland) John Higgins	5
28	(England) Neal Foulds	1
20	(Canada) Alain Robidoux	5
12	(England) Nigel Bond	2
60	(Wales) Steve Newbury	3
55	(Northern Ireland) Jason Prince	5
22	(England) Martin Clark	3
8	(England) Jimmy White	5
(Northern Ireland) Michael Duffy	1
19	(Northern Ireland) Joe Swail	5
17	(England) Andy Hicks	2
11	(England) Peter Ebdon	5
10	(Republic of Ireland) Ken Doherty	5
54	(England) Mark Flowerdew	3
(England) Andrew Cairns	1
7	(Scotland) Alan McManus	5

Last 16; Best of 9 frames
1	(Scotland) John Higgins	5
20	(Canada) Alain Robidoux	4
55	(Northern Ireland) Jason Prince	0
8	(England) Jimmy White	5
19	(Northern Ireland) Joe Swail	5
11	(England) Peter Ebdon	3
10	(Republic of Ireland) Ken Doherty	1
7	(Scotland) Alan McManus	5

Quarter-finals; Best of 9 frames
1	(Scotland) John Higgins	5
8	(England) Jimmy White	2
19	(Northern Ireland) Joe Swail	3
7	(Scotland) Alan McManus	5

Semi-finals; Best of 17 frames
1	(Scotland) John Higgins	9
7	(Scotland) Alan McManus	7

=== Bottom half ===
Last 64; Best of 9 frames
3	(England) Steve Davis	5
(England) Lee Richardson	2
29	(England) Jason Ferguson	5
(England) Stuart Reardon	3
32	(Northern Ireland) Dennis Taylor	2
56	(England) Joe Johnson	5
13	(England) Dave Harold	2
(Wales) Matthew Stevens	5
14	(Malta) Tony Drago	5
36	(Wales) Doug Mountjoy	1
18	(New Zealand) Dene O'Kane	5
(England) Leigh Griffin	1
26	(England) Steve James	5
(Australia) Quinten Hann	4
5	(England) John Parrott	0
47	(England) David Finbow	5
6	(Thailand) James Wattana	5
52	(England) Mark King	0
25	(England) Willie Thorne	5
(South Africa) Silvino Francisco	3
23	(England) Gary Wilkinson	4
(Pakistan) Shokat Ali	5
16	(England) David Roe	2
38	(Republic of Ireland) Fergal O'Brien	5
9	(Wales) Darren Morgan	5
(Republic of Ireland) Stephen O'Connor	4
31	(England) Anthony Hamilton	5
(Malaysia) Sam Chong	3
24	(England) Tony Knowles	3
42	(Wales) Mark Bennett	5
2	(Scotland) Stephen Hendry	5
(England) Jon Birch	0

Last 32; Best of 9 frames
3	(England) Steve Davis	5
29	(England) Jason Ferguson	4
56	(England) Joe Johnson	1
(Wales) Matthew Stevens	5
14	(Malta) Tony Drago	4
18	(New Zealand) Dene O'Kane	5
26	(England) Steve James	5
47	(England) David Finbow	0
6	(Thailand) James Wattana	5
25	(England) Willie Thorne	4
(Pakistan) Shokat Ali	1
38	(Republic of Ireland) Fergal O'Brien	5
9	(Wales) Darren Morgan	5
31	(England) Anthony Hamilton	3
42	(Wales) Mark Bennett	2
2	(Scotland) Stephen Hendry	5

Last 16; Best of 9 frames
3	(England) Steve Davis	5
(Wales) Matthew Stevens	2
18	(New Zealand) Dene O'Kane	1
26	(England) Steve James	5
6	(Thailand) James Wattana	3
38	(Republic of Ireland) Fergal O'Brien	5
9	(Wales) Darren Morgan	0
2	(Scotland) Stephen Hendry	5

Quarter-finals; Best of 9 frames
3	(England) Steve Davis	3
26	(England) Steve James	5
38	(Republic of Ireland) Fergal O'Brien	3
2	(Scotland) Stephen Hendry	5

Semi-finals; Best of 17 frames
26	(England) Steve James	5
2	(Scotland) Stephen Hendry	9

== Final ==
Final: Best of 17 frames. Referee: Alan Chamberlain; Crowtree Centre, Sunderland, England, 29 October 1995.
John Higgins (1); Scotland	5–9	Stephen Hendry (2); Scotland
Afternoon: 47–76, 57–22, 34–79 (54), 66–43, 75–55 (Higgins 55), 0–64 (58), 3–66, 10–69 (60); Evening: 72–55, 20–98 (55), 56–63 (Higgins 56, Hendry 53), 71–64 (Hendry 51); 8–100 (87), 0–117 (73)
56	Highest break	87
0	Century breaks	0
2	50+ breaks	8

== Century breaks ==
=== Qualifying stage centuries ===
- 140 – Sam Chong

=== Televised stage centuries ===
- 138, 129, 112, 103, 102 – Stephen Hendry
- 131, 124, 101 – John Higgins
- 128 – Tony Drago
- 124, 123 – Anthony Hamilton
- 115 – Martin Clark
- 115 – Alan McManus
- 109 – Willie Thorne
- 105, 104, 100 – Jimmy White
- 105 – Mark Davis
- 104, 100 – Joe Swail
- 102 – Steve Davis
- 102 – Ronnie O'Sullivan
- 101 – Steve James
