= 1991 UK Championship =

Tournament information
- Dates: 23 November – 1 December 1991
- Venue: Preston Guild Hall
- City: Preston
- Country: England
- Organisation: WPBSA
- Format: Ranking event
- Winner's share: £35,000
- Highest break: Martin Clark (ENG) (142)

Final
- Champion: John Parrott (ENG)
- Runner-up: Jimmy White (ENG)
- Score: 16–13

The 1991 UK Championship was a professional ranking snooker tournament that took place between 23 November and 1 December 1991 at the Guild Hall in Preston, England. The televised stages were shown on BBC.

The highest break of the televised stages was 142 made by Martin Clark and the same for the non-televised stages was 137 made by Mark Bennett.

John Parrott won his first and only UK Championship by defeating Jimmy White 16–13 in the final.

== Prize fund ==
The breakdown of prize money for this year is shown below:

Winner:	£35,000
Runner-up:	£20,000
Highest break:	£2,500

== Main draw ==
Round 1 Best of 17 frames
(Scotland) Stephen Hendry	9
(Northern Ireland) Alex Higgins	4
(South Africa) Peter Francisco	9
(Pakistan) Shokat Ali	8
(England) Martin Clark	9
(England) Mark Johnston-Allen	5
(Wales) Mark Bennett	9
(England) Jeff Cundy	2
(Wales) Doug Mountjoy	3
(England) Rod Lawler	9
(Wales) Steve Newbury	9
(Netherlands) Stefan Mazrocis	7
(England) Gary Wilkinson	9
(England) Stuart Reardon	5
(Malta) Tony Drago	9
(England) Barry West	5
(England) Neal Foulds	9
(Australia) Warren King	8
(Wales) Wayne Jones	8
(England) Nick Terry	9
(Wales) Terry Griffiths	9
(England) David Roe	4
(Canada) Bob Chaperon	9
(England) Andrew Cairns	8
(England) Tony Knowles	3
(Wales) Anthony Davies	9
(England) Joe Johnson	7
(Wales) Darren Morgan	9
(England) Jimmy White	9
(England) Bill Oliver	4
(England) John Virgo	7
(England) Dave Martin	9
(England) Steve Davis	9
(England) Andy Hicks	2
(Australia) Eddie Charlton	9
(England) Jason Smith	6
(Canada) Alain Robidoux	9
(Scotland) Murdo MacLeod	3
(Thailand) James Wattana	9
(Republic of Ireland) Paddy Browne	3
(England) Tony Jones	9
(Canada) Cliff Thorburn	8
(Wales) Cliff Wilson	8
(Scotland) Billy Snaddon	9
(England) Steve James	9
(England) Mick Price	3
(England) Danny Fowler	7
(Scotland) Drew Henry	9
(England) Mike Hallett	7
(Northern Ireland) Jason Prince	9
(England) Nigel Bond	9
(Republic of Ireland) Joe Delaney	3
(England) Dean Reynolds	9
(England) David Taylor	4
(New Zealand) Dene O'Kane	9
(England) Brian Morgan	7
(Northern Ireland) Dennis Taylor	9
(England) Rex Williams	8
(England) Willie Thorne	9
(Isle of Man) Tony Wilson	2
(England) John Parrott	9
(England) Bradley Jones	5
(South Africa) Silvino Francisco	8
(Republic of Ireland) David McDonnell	9

Round 2 Best of 17 frames
(Scotland) Stephen Hendry	9
(South Africa) Peter Francisco	1
(England) Martin Clark	9
(Wales) Mark Bennett	5
(England) Rod Lawler	6
(Wales) Steve Newbury	9
(England) Gary Wilkinson	6
(Malta) Tony Drago	9
(England) Neal Foulds	9
(England) Nick Terry	7
(Wales) Terry Griffiths	9
(Canada) Bob Chaperon	5
(Wales) Anthony Davies	4
(Wales) Darren Morgan	9
(England) Jimmy White	9
(England) Dave Martin	3
(England) Steve Davis	9
(Australia) Eddie Charlton	4
(Canada) Alain Robidoux	2
(Thailand) James Wattana	9
(England) Tony Jones	9
(Scotland) Billy Snaddon	2
(England) Steve James	9
(Scotland) Drew Henry	7
(Northern Ireland) Jason Prince	9
(England) Nigel Bond	8
(England) Dean Reynolds	9
(New Zealand) Dene O'Kane	4
(Northern Ireland) Dennis Taylor	6
(England) Willie Thorne	9
(England) John Parrott	9
(Republic of Ireland) David McDonnell	4

Round 3 Best of 17 frames
(Scotland) Stephen Hendry	9
(England) Martin Clark	3
(Wales) Steve Newbury	1
(Malta) Tony Drago	9
(England) Neal Foulds	9
(Wales) Terry Griffiths	2
(Wales) Darren Morgan	1
(England) Jimmy White	9
(England) Steve Davis	6
(Thailand) James Wattana	9
(England) Tony Jones	6
(England) Steve James	9
(Northern Ireland) Jason Prince	7
(England) Dean Reynolds	9
(England) Willie Thorne	4
(England) John Parrott	9

Quarter-finals; Best of 17 frames
(Scotland) Stephen Hendry	9
(Malta) Tony Drago	6
(England) Neal Foulds	7
(England) Jimmy White	9
(Thailand) James Wattana	9
(England) Steve James	5
(England) Dean Reynolds	6
(England) John Parrott	9

Semi-finals; Best of 17 frames
(Scotland) Stephen Hendry	2
(England) Jimmy White	9
(Thailand) James Wattana	7
(England) John Parrott	9

Final; Best of 31 frames
(England) Jimmy White	13
(England) John Parrott	16

== Final ==
Final: Best of 31 frames. Referee: John Street; The Guild Hall, Preston, England, 30 November and 1 December 1991.
John Parrott; England	16–13	Jimmy White; England
First session: 9–103, 39–67, 74–10 (74), 8–80, 83–17 (83), 73–50 (White 50), 66–52; Second session: 61–1, 141–0 (137), 74–14, 55–60, 1–144 (55), 12–79 (53), 33–73; Third session: 51–63, 92–1, 75–45, 95–41 (81), 24–66, 85–31, 102–0 (58); Fourth session: 0–121 (56, 65), 57–48, 0–92 (54), 79–41, 5–114 (65), 94–24 (51), 0–83 (83), 92–0 (83)
137	Highest break	83
1	Century breaks	0
7	50+ breaks	8

== Century breaks ==
All rounds

- 142, 100 – Martin Clark
- 139, 118, 100 – Drew Henry
- 138, 117 – Mark Boyd
- 138, 106, 101 – Neal Foulds
- 137 – Mark Bennett
- 137 – John Parrott
- 136, 107 – Jeff Cundy
- 136 – Gary Baldrey
- 136 – Nigel Bond
- 134, 115, 102 – Paul Dawkins
- 134 – Mark Davis
- 134 – Kevin Young
- 133 – Darren Hackeson
- 132 – Dave Harold
- 130, 110 – Stephen Hendry
- 129 – Anthony Hamilton
- 127 – Lee Richardson
- 126 – Oliver King
- 126 – Alain Robidoux
- 125 – Peter Lines
- 124, 105 – Wayne Jones
- 123, 122 – Joe Swail
- 123, 119, 107 – Fergal O'Brien
- 123, 117, 109, 103 – James Wattana
- 123, 117, 101 – Tony Drago
- 123 – Ken Doherty
- 122, 105 – Nick Terry
- 122, 105 – Bjorn L'Orange
- 122 – Mehmet Husnu
- 120 – David Taylor
- 119 – Allison Fisher
- 119 – Mike Hallett
- 119 – Robert Harrhy
- 118 – Dene O'Kane
- 117 – Troy Shaw
- 117 – Jimmy White
- 115 – Bradley Jones
- 115 – Gary Lees
- 113 – Paul Davies
- 112, 108, 107 – Willie Thorne
- 111 – Eugene Hughes
- 111 – Peter Daubney
- 110 – Stuart Reardon
- 109 – Tony Meo
- 109 – John Read
- 108 – David McDonnell
- 107 – Bob Chaperon
- 106 – Brian Cassidy
- 106 – Dean Reynolds
- 105, 102, 101 – Steve James
- 105 – Peter Bardsley
- 105 – Colin Morton
- 105 – Adrian Rosa
- 105 – Paul Webb
- 104 – David Grimwood
- 103, 102 – Tony Jones
- 103 – Anthony Davies
- 103 – Terry Griffiths
- 101 – Julian Goodyear
- 100 – Sean Lanigan
- 100 – Michael Stocks
