= 1996 Malta Masters =

Tournament information
- Dates: 15–19 May 1996
- Venue: Jerma Palace Hotel
- City: Marsaskala
- Country: Malta
- Format: Non-Ranking event
- Total prize fund: £15,000
- Winner's share: £4,000

Final
- Champion: (England) Mark Davis
- Runner-up: (England) John Read
- Score: 6–3

The 1996 Malta Masters was a non-ranking invitational snooker tournament which took place in May 1996. The tournament was held at the Jerma Palace Hotel in Marsaskala, and featured twelve professional players, alongside four amateurs - Malta's Tony Brincat, Jason Pelow and Kevin d'Agostino, and Amnuayporn Chotipong of Thailand.

Mark Davis won the event, beating John Read 6–3 in the final.

== Main draw ==
Last 16; Best of 7 frames
(England) John Read | 4
(Thailand) Amnuayporn Chotipong | 0
(England) Gary Wilkinson | 4
(Malta) Jason Peplow | 1
(Thailand) Suriya Suwannasingh | 4
(Malta) Tony Brincat | 1
(Wales) Dominic Dale | 4
(Malta) Alex Borg | 1
(Scotland) Martin Dziewialtowski | 4
(England) Barry Pinches | 2
(Northern Ireland) Patrick Wallace | 4
(Malta) Tony Drago | 3
(Finland) Robin Hull | 4
(Pakistan) Shokat Ali | 3
(England) Mark Davis | 4
(Malta) Kevin d'Agostino | 0

Quarter-finals; Best of 7 frames
(England) John Read | 4
(England) Gary Wilkinson | 2
(Thailand) Suriya Suwannasingh | 4
(Wales) Dominic Dale | 2
(Scotland) Martin Dziewialtowski | 4
(Northern Ireland) Patrick Wallace | 1
(Finland) Robin Hull | 3
(England) Mark Davis | 4

Semi-finals; Best of 9 frames
(England) John Read | 5
(Thailand) Suriya Suwannasingh | 3
(Scotland) Martin Dziewialtowski | 4
(England) Mark Davis | 5

Final; Best of 11 frames
(England) John Read | 3
(England) Mark Davis | 6
