= Paul Cavney =

English snooker player

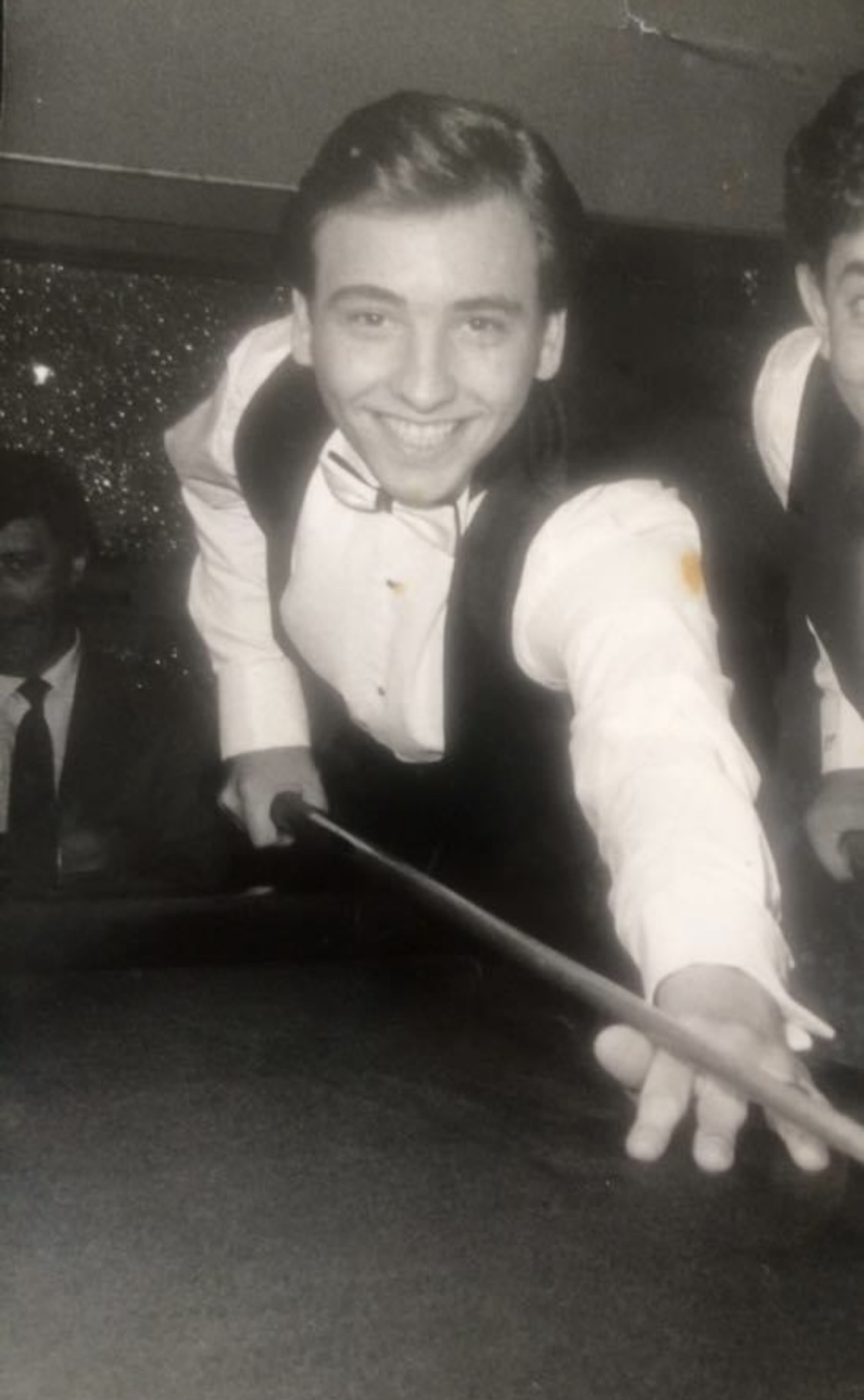

Personal information
- Born: 6 August 1967 (age 59)

Sport
- Country: England
- Sport: Snooker
- Professional: 1991–1997, 1998/1999, 2000/2001
- Highest ranking: 94 (1996/1997)
- Best ranking finish: Last 32 (x1)

Paul Cavney (born 6 August 1967) is an English former professional snooker player.

== Career ==
Cavney was born in 1967, and turned professional in 1991.

Having failed to reach the final stages of any ranking event in the first three seasons of his career, Cavney won seven matches to qualify for the last 32 of the 1995 World Championship at the Crucible Theatre. He defeated John Bayliss 5–0, Roger Leighton 5–2, Andrew Cairns 10–6, Michael Judge 10–9, Les Dodd also 10–9, Nick Terry 10–8 and Neal Foulds 10–9, setting up an encounter with Malta's Tony Drago. In the event, Drago led 8–0 and although Cavney claimed the next two frames, the deficit was greater than the latter could recover, and Drago won 10–2.

This remarkable run did not spark any further success in the professional game for Cavney; after reaching the last 64 of the 1997 European Open, where he lost 4–5 to Drew Henry, he lost his place on tour at the end of the 1996/1997 season, ranked 124th in the world.

Cavney re-qualified as a professional for the 1998/1999 and 2000/2001 seasons, but fell back into the amateur ranks immediately on both occasions.

Having lost his pre-qualifying matches in the 2009, 2010 and 2011 World Championships, latterly 2–5 to Ian Barry Stark, Cavney did not enter a tournament thereafter.
