= Ashot Potikyan =

Russian snooker player (1946–2017)

Personal information
- Born: 21 May 1946 Russia
- Died: 4 January 2017 (aged 70)

Sport
- Country: Russia
- Sport: Snooker
- Professional: 1994-1997
- Highest ranking: 401

Ashot Potikyan (Armenian: Աշոտ Փոթիկյան, Russian: Ашот Потикян; 21 May 1946, Russia – 4 January 2017) was the first Russian professional snooker & russian pyramid player.

== Performance and rankings timeline ==
Tournament	1990/ 91	1993/ 94	1994/ 95	1995/ 96	1996/ 97	1997/ 98	2002/ 03	2003/ 04
Ranking (Note: It shows the ranking at the beginning of the season.)	(Note: He was an amateur.)		(Note: New players on the Main Tour don't have a ranking.)	454	401			
Ranking tournaments
LG Cup (Note: The event was called the Grand Prix (1990/1991 and 1993/1994–1997/1998))	A	A	LQ	LQ	A	A	A	A
UK Championship	A	A	LQ	LQ	A	A	A	A
Welsh Open	A	A	LQ	LQ	A	A	A	A
Players Championship (Note: The event was called the International Open (1992/1993–1996/1997) and the Scottish Open (1997/1998 and 2002/2003))	NH	A	LQ	LQ	A	A	A	A
European Open	A	A	LQ	LQ	A	NH	A	A
British Open	A	A	LQ	LQ	A	A	A	A
World Championship	A	LQ	LQ	A	A	A	LQ	LQ
Non-ranking tournaments
The Masters	A	A	LQ	LQ	LQ	LQ	A	A
Former ranking tournaments
Asian Classic (Note: The event was called the Dubai Classic (1990/1991 and 1993/1994–1994/1995) and Thailand Classic (1995/1996))	A	A	LQ	LQ	A	Tournament Not Held		
German Open	Tournament Not Held			LQ	A	A	Not Held	
Thailand Masters (Note: The event was called the Asian Open (1990/1991) and the Thailand Open (1993/1994–1996/1997))	A	A	LQ	LQ	A	A	NR	NH
Former non-ranking tournaments
World Masters	LQ	Tournament Not Held						

Performance Table Legend
LQ	lost in the qualifying draw	#R	lost in the early rounds of the tournament (WR = Wildcard round, RR = Round robin)	QF	lost in the quarter-finals
SF	lost in the semi-finals	F	lost in the final	W	won the tournament
DNQ	did not qualify for the tournament	A	did not participate in the tournament	WD	withdrew from the tournament
DQ	disqualified from the tournament				

NH / Not Held	event was not held.
NR / Non-Ranking Event	event is/was no longer a ranking event.
R / Ranking Event	event is/was a ranking event.
MR / Minor-Ranking Event	event is/was a minor-ranking event.
