= Jeff Cundy =

English snooker player

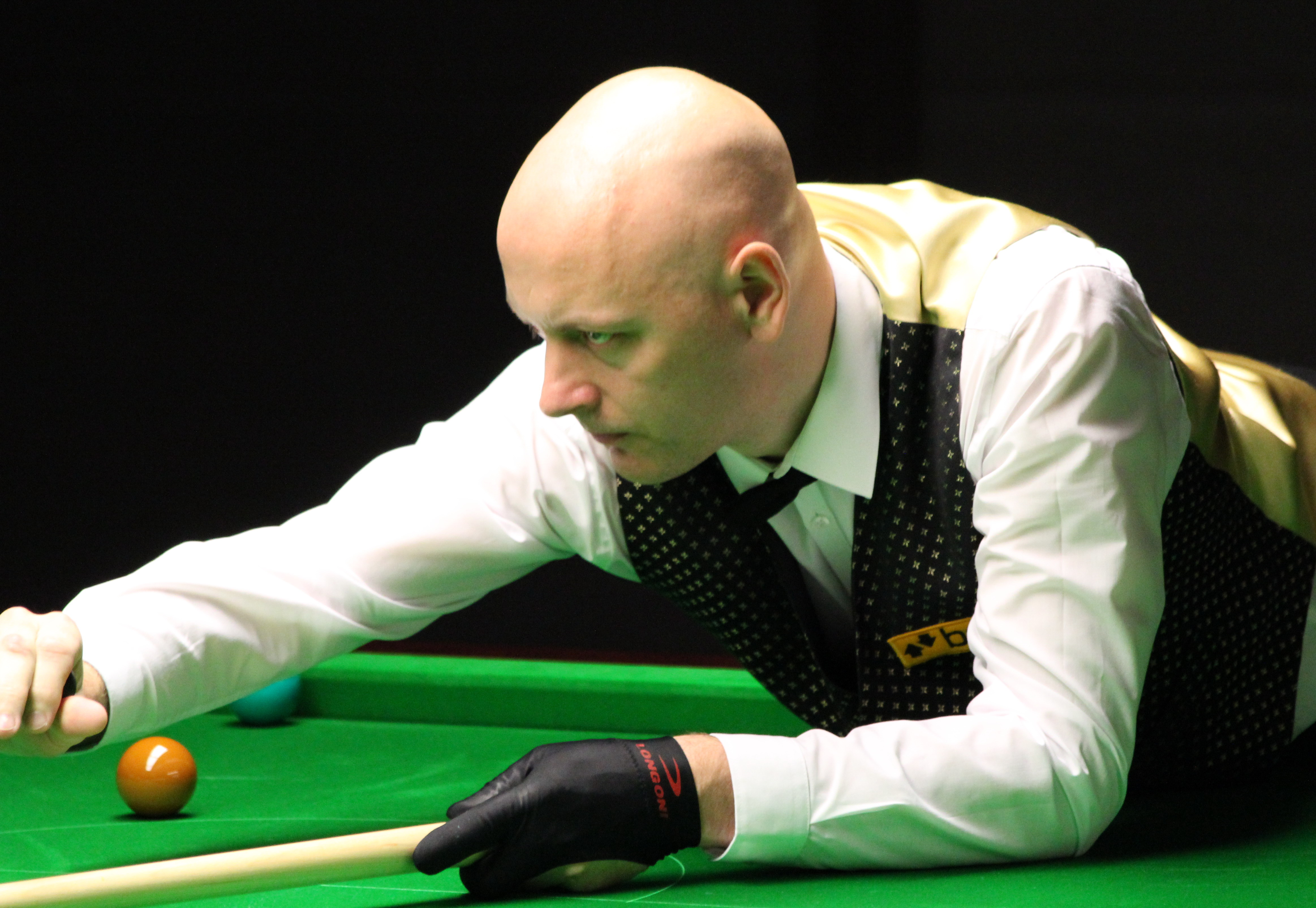
- Paul Hunter Classic 2012

Personal information
- Born: 1 March 1969 (age 57)

Sport
- Country: England
- Sport: Snooker
- Professional: 1991–1997, 1998/1999, 2000–2003, 2006/2007
- Highest ranking: 92 (2006–07)
- Best ranking finish: Last 32 (1995 Welsh Open)

Jeff Cundy (born 1 March 1969) is an English former professional snooker player.

== Career ==
=== 1991 to 1997 ===
Cundy turned professional in 1991, playing and losing his first match against Tim Norris 2–5 in the Dubai Classic of that year. He recorded his first victory in his next match, beating Philip Minchin 5–2 en route to the third qualifying round of the Grand Prix, where he was eliminated 4–5 by Gary Lees.

Cundy's furthest progression in an event in his début season was in the 1991 UK Championship, where he reached the last 64, beating Jason Curtis 6–2, Peter Bardsley 6–2, Darren Guest 6–1, the young Anthony Hamilton 6–3, Graham Cripsey 6–5, Gary Natale 6–4 and Jim Wych 6–2, before losing 2–9 to Mark Bennett. This run earned him £750, and he finished the season ranked 148th.

Cundy entered thirteen tournaments during his second season as a professional; again, his furthest run was to the last 64, this time in Event Three of the 1993 Strachan Challenge, where he lost 1–5 to future World Championship finalist Nigel Bond.

His best showing in a ranking event came at the 1993 British Open, where he lost 4–5 to Brian Morgan in the last 96. Having earned £1,025 during the season, Cundy finished it ranked six places higher than the last, at 142nd in the world.

The following season began with another qualifying loss in the Dubai Classic, this year 4–6 to Paul Wykes. Cundy had better luck in the 1993 UK Championship, defeating Jonathan Saunders 5–1 and Joe Grech 5–3 before losing 3–5 to Karl Broughton in the last 128.

More mild success followed in the Thailand Open, where Cundy reached the last 96, losing 1–5 to Dave Finbow, and the 1994 World Championship, where he lost 4–10 to emerging star Ronnie O'Sullivan, also in the last 96.

Cundy began the 1994/95 season with a ranking of 138th, and reached the last 32 of the 1995 Welsh Open, defeating Adrian Gunnell 5–0, Jason Greaves 5–2, Mark Davis 5–1, Roger Garrett 5–0, Nick Terry 5–4 and former world number two Tony Knowles 5–1 before eventually losing 3–5 to Antony Bolsover.

He followed this performance with a run to the last 64 of the International Open, where he was defeated 1–5 by Mike Hallett.

£5,125 in prize money earned during this season elevated Cundy's ranking to 114th for the 1995/96 season.

1995/1996 brought two highlights for Cundy, with runs to the last 64 of both the 1995 Grand Prix and the 1996 European Open; he lost 3–5 to Joe Swail in the former, and was whitewashed 0–5 by Ian Brumby in the latter.

Having retained his professional status as the world number 103, Cundy was unable to replicate his good form of the last few seasons in 1996/1997, earning only £490 from reaching the last 96 of the 1997 Welsh Open, where he lost 3–5 to Euan Henderson. He slipped back to 132nd in the rankings, and lost his professional status.

=== 1998 to 2003 ===
Forced to enter the tour qualifying events in 1997/1998, Cundy performed well, reaching the last 64 on four occasions and the last 32 once, and regained his place on tour for the following season.

In 1998/1999, he reached the last 16 of the Benson & Hedges Championship, losing 4–5 to Graham Horne, and the last 96 of the 1998 UK Championship where he again faced Joe Swail, this time losing 1–5. The next season was uneventful, its highlight being a run once more to the last 16 of the Benson & Hedges Championship; on this occasion, Cundy lost 2–5 to Simon Bedford.

The 2000/2001 season saw a revival of the mild successes Cundy had enjoyed in the mid-1990s, as he reached the last 96 of three ranking events and played in the last 64 of the 2001 Welsh Open, where he lost 4–5 to Paul Davies. His £9,050 earned this season improved his ranking to 105th.

2001/2002 was another dry season; having reached only the last 64 of the 2001 Benson & Hedges Championship, losing 1–5 to Nigel Bond, Cundy earned £4,150 from his appearance in the last 96 of the 2002 World Championship, a match he lost 6–10 to James Reynolds.

=== 2006/2007 ===
Having not progressed any further than the last 80 in any ranking event during the 2002/03 season, Cundy dropped off the tour in 2003. He regained his place for the 2006/2007 season, but won only two matches in ranking events - 3–2 over Ian Preece in the 2006 Grand Prix, and 9–6 over Mark Joyce in the 2006 UK Championship - and resumed his amateur career thereafter.

=== Amateur career ===
Since 2007, Cundy has occasionally entered Players Tour Championship events, and also the Q-School attempting to win back his place as a professional. He reached the last 64 of the 2013 Indian Open, losing 3–4 to Li Yan, and the same stage of the 2015 Riga Open, where he lost 2–4 to Martin O'Donnell. In May 2026, he entered Q School and defeated former professional Bulcsú Révész in event one.

== Performance and rankings timeline ==
Tournament	1991/ 92	1992/ 93	1993/ 94		1994/ 95	1995/ 96	1996/ 97	1997/ 98	1998/ 99	1999/ 00	2000/ 01	2001/ 02	2002/ 03	2003/ 04	2004/ 05	2006/ 07	2010/ 11	2011/ 12	2012/ 13	2013/ 14	2014/ 15	2015/ 16	2016/ 17	2017/ 18	2026/ 27
Ranking (Note: It shows the ranking at the beginning of the season)	(Note: New players on the Main Tour don't have a ranking)	148	142		138	114	103	(Note: He was an amateur)				105	97												
Ranking tournaments
Championship League	Tournament Not Held																Non-Ranking Event								RR
China Open (Note: The event was called the China International (1997/1998–1998/1999))	Tournament Not Held							NR	LQ	A	LQ	LQ	Not Held		A	LQ	A	A	A	A	A	A	A	A	
British Open	LQ	LQ	LQ		LQ	LQ	LQ	A	LQ	A	LQ	LQ	LQ	A	A	Tournament Not Held									
UK Championship	1R	LQ	LQ		LQ	LQ	LQ	A	LQ	A	LQ	LQ	LQ	A	A	LQ	A	A	A	A	A	A	A	A	
Scottish Open (Note: The event was called the International Open (1992/1993–1996/1997) and the Players Championship (2003/2004))	NH	LQ	LQ		1R	LQ	LQ	A	LQ	A	LQ	LQ	LQ	A	Tournament Not Held				MR	Not Held			A	A	
German Masters (Note: The event was called the German Open (1995/1996–1997/1998))	Tournament Not Held					LQ	LQ	A	NR	Tournament Not Held							A	A	A	A	A	A	A	A	
Welsh Open	LQ	LQ	LQ		2R	LQ	LQ	A	LQ	A	LQ	LQ	LQ	A	A	LQ	A	A	A	A	A	A	A	A	
World Grand Prix	Tournament Not Held																				NR	DNQ	DNQ	DNQ	
Players Championship (Note: The event was called the Players Tour Championship Grand Final (2010/2011–2015/2016))	Tournament Not Held																DNQ	DNQ	DNQ	DNQ	DNQ	DNQ	DNQ	DNQ	
World Open (Note: The event was called the Grand Prix (1991/1992–2000/2001, 2004/2005 and 2006/2007) and the LG Cup (2001/2002–2003/2004))	LQ	LQ	LQ		LQ	1R	LQ	A	LQ	A	LQ	LQ	LQ	A	A	LQ	A	A	A	LQ	Not Held		A	A	
Tour Championship	Tournament Not Held																								
World Championship	LQ	LQ	LQ		LQ	LQ	LQ	LQ	LQ	LQ	LQ	LQ	LQ	LQ	LQ	LQ	A	A	A	A	A	A	A	A	
Non-ranking tournaments
Masters	LQ	LQ	LQ		LQ	LQ	LQ	LQ	LQ	LQ	LQ	LQ	LQ	A	A	LQ	A	A	A	A	A	A	A	A	
Former ranking tournaments
Classic	LQ	Tournament Not Held																							
Strachan Open (Note: The event was called the Strachan Challenge (1992/1993–1993/1994))	LQ	MR	NR		Tournament Not Held																				
Asian Classic (Note: The event was called the Dubai Classic (1991/1992–1994/1995) and the Thailand Classic (1995/1996))	LQ	LQ	LQ		LQ	LQ	LQ	Tournament Not Held																	
Thailand Masters (Note: The event was called the Asian Open (1991/1992–1992/1993) and the Thailand Open (1993/1994–1996/1997))	LQ	LQ	LQ		LQ	LQ	LQ	A	LQ	A	LQ	LQ	NR	Not Held		NR	Tournament Not Held								
Irish Masters	Non-Ranking Event												LQ	A	A	NR	Tournament Not Held								
Northern Ireland Trophy	Tournament Not Held															LQ	Tournament Not Held								
Australian Goldfields Open (Note: The event was called the Australian Open (1994/1995–1995/1996) and the Australian Masters (1995/1996))	Tournament Not Held				Non-Ranking		Tournament Not Held											A	LQ	A	A	LQ	Not Held		
Paul Hunter Classic (Note: The event was called the Grand Prix Fürth (2004/2005) and the Fürth German Open (2006/2007))	Tournament Not Held														Pro-am		Minor-Ranking Event						LQ	LQ	NH
Indian Open	Tournament Not Held																			1R	A	NH	A	A	NH
European Masters (Note: The event was called the European Open (1991/1992–1996/1997 and 2001/2002–2003/2004), the Irish Open (1998/1999) and the Malta Cup (2004/2005 and 2006/2007))	LQ	LQ	LQ		LQ	LQ	LQ	NH	LQ	Not Held		LQ	LQ	A	A	LQ	Tournament Not Held						A	A	NH
Gibraltar Open	Tournament Not Held																					MR	1R	A	NH
Former non-ranking tournaments
Strachan Challenge	R	MR	LQ	LQ	Tournament Not Held																				
Merseyside Professional Championship	Not Held		A		A	WD	A	3R	1R	2R	1R	2R	A	A	3R	Tournament Not Held									
World Grand Prix	Tournament Not Held																				DNQ	Tournament Not Held			

Performance Table Legend
LQ	lost in the qualifying draw	#R	lost in the early rounds of the tournament (WR = Wildcard round, RR = Round robin)	QF	lost in the quarter-finals
SF	lost in the semi-finals	F	lost in the final	W	won the tournament
DNQ	did not qualify for the tournament	A	did not participate in the tournament	WD	withdrew from the tournament

NH / Not Held	means an event was not held
NR / Non-Ranking Event	means an event is/was no longer a ranking event
R / Ranking Event	means an event is/was a ranking event
MR / Minor-Ranking Event	means an event is/was a minor-ranking event
PA / Pro-am event	means an event is/was a pro-am event

== Career finals ==
=== Amateur finals: 10 (3 titles) ===
Outcome	No.	Year	Championship	Opponent in the final	Score
Winner	1.	1986	British Under-21 Championship	(England) Vince McCluskey	5–3
Winner	2.	1991	German Open Snooker Ranking - Event 1 - 4 Stars - Munich Open	(Belgium) Peter Bullen	6–1
Winner	3.	1991	German Open Snooker Ranking - Event 18 - 3 Stars - Aachen Open	(England) Chris Scanlon	6–3
Runner-up	1.	2006	English Open Championship	(England) Jamie O'Neill	3–8
Runner-up	2.	2006	European Championship	(Malta) Alex Borg	5–7
Runner-up	3.	2012	EBSA Qualifying Tour - Bulgaria	(England) John Astley	2–3
Runner-up	4.	2017	English Amateur Tour - Event 5	(England) Kuldesh Johal	2–4
Runner-up	5.	2023	EPSB Open Series - Cueball - Event 2	(England) Gary Miller	2–3
Runner-up	6.	2024	EPSB Open Series - Elite - Event 4	(England) Simon Blackwell	1–3
Runner-up	7.	2024	EPSB Open Series - Breakers - Event 3	(Hong Kong) Shaun Liu	2–3
