= Stuart Reardon (snooker player) =

English snooker player

Personal information
- Born: 28 November 1969 (age 56) Barking, London, England

Sport
- Country: England
- Sport: Snooker
- Professional: 1991–1997, 1998/1999, 2000/2001
- Highest ranking: 88 (1992/1993)
- Best ranking finish: Last 32 (x2)

Stuart Reardon (born 1969) is an English former professional snooker player.

== Career ==
Born in 1969, Reardon turned professional in 1991. His debut season featured a run to the last 32 of the 1992 Asian Open, where he lost 4–5 to Steve Campbell, and the last 64 at both the 1991 UK Championship - losing to Gary Wilkinson 5–9 having led 5–3 - and the 1992 British Open, where he was defeated 5–1 by Nigel Bond. The season included victories over Peter Francisco, Andy Hicks, Barry Pinches and most notably, in the 1992 European Open, a 5–0 whitewash of John Spencer, who played only one more match before his retirement that year.

Reardon's world ranking rose to 88th for the 1992/1993 season; he next made any progress in a ranking event at the 1993 European Open, where he lost in the last 64, 3–5 to Noppadon Noppachorn.

In 1995, after several years of poor form, Reardon progressed to the last 64 at the Grand Prix and the last 32 of the UK Championship, losing 3–5 to Jason Ferguson in the former and 4–9 to Jimmy White in the latter. En route to reaching the last 16 of that season's Benson & Hedges Championship, Reardon had beaten nineteen-year-old Stuart Bingham 5–1, in the process making a break of 115.

Reardon dropped off the tour in 1997 as the world number 129, but successfully re-qualified in time for the 1998/1999 season. Earning only £405 during that season, he was again forced to qualify, and again, despite losing all of his qualifying matches, he was successful. At the 2000 UK Championship, he reached the last 96, his best showing for several years; there, he again met Bingham, and Bingham this time compiled a century break of his own in defeating Reardon 5–2.

Having finished the 2000/2001 season ranked 139th, Reardon lost his professional status for a third time, at the age of 32. He attempted to regain his place over the following two seasons, but was unable to progress far enough in any tournament to do so.

== Personal life ==
In 1992, Reardon was jailed for six months for reckless driving, following an incident in January of that year which resulted in the deaths of two of his passengers, fellow snooker players Martin Carolan and Chris Brooks.
