= John Read (snooker player) =

English snooker player

Sport
- Country: England
- Sport: Snooker
- Professional: 1991–2003
- Highest ranking: 62 (1998–99)
- Best ranking finish: Quarter-final (x2)

John Read is an English former professional snooker player. Read competed between 1991 and 2003, with his highest ranking being 62nd. His most notable tournament run was at the 1996 Malta Masters, where he was beaten in the final by Mark Davis.

== Career ==
Read turned professional in 1991, making an immediate impact at the 1992 Asian Open; there, in only his fifth ranking tournament, he reached the quarter-finals, defeating seven players - including Fred Davis, John Virgo and Rex Williams - to qualify for the final stages in Bangkok before also eliminating Brian Morgan and David Roe. He could not progress any further, however, as Joe Swail whitewashed him 5–0 to reach the semi-finals.

In the following year's edition of the Asian Open, Read reached the last 32, where he lost 3–5 to Nick Fruin; his only other performance of note during the 1992–93 season came in qualifying for the World Championship, where he reached the last 48. Requiring only one more win to reach the Crucible Theatre for the first time, he lost 9–10 to Tony Jones, finishing the season ranked 78th.

Having came close to reaching his second ranking event quarter-final at the 1995 Welsh Open - where he lost 4–5 to Peter Ebdon in the last 16 - Read was one of the players invited to compete in the 1996 Malta Masters in May 1996. As part of a sixteen-man field, he defeated amateur Amnuayporn Chotipong 4–0, Gary Wilkinson 4–2 and Suriya Suwannasingh 5–3 to reach the first final of his professional career. He could not capture his first title, as Mark Davis beat him 6–3.

The result in Malta did not inspire better performances during 1996–97, but in the following season, Read reached his second career quarter-final, in the 1997 Grand Prix. Ranked 70th for the season, he beat Dean Reynolds 5–3 before eliminating three consecutive players who themselves were ranked in the top 32 - Rod Lawler 5–3, Ronnie O'Sullivan 5–2 and Tony Drago 5–3 - to set up a meeting with John Higgins. Higgins proved too strong a challenge for Read; he scored only 48 points in a 0–5 defeat.

Thanks to his efforts in the Grand Prix, Read entered the 1998/1999 season ranked within the top 64, at 62nd, but his best showing that season came at the UK Championship, where he reached the last 32 before losing 5–9 to Lawler(However, his 1st round opponent, Ronnie O'Sullivan withdrew from the match due to exhaustion). He qualified once in his career for the final stages of the World Championship at the Crucible Theatre, in the 2000 edition of the event. However, after beating Davis, Neal Foulds and Morgan to qualify, he lost 4–10 in the first round to the eventual champion, Mark Williams.

The 2000 World Championship was the last time Read featured at the venue stage of a ranking tournament; with poor performances in qualifying events between 2000 and 2003, he slipped from 63rd in the rankings for the 1999–2000 season to 98th at the end of 2002–03, and at that time was relegated from the main tour.
