= 1994 World Snooker Championship =

Professional snooker tournament

1994 Embassy World Snooker Championship
Tournament information
- Dates: 16 April – 2 May 1994
- Venue: Crucible Theatre
- City: Sheffield
- Country: England
- Organisation: WPBSA
- Format: Ranking event
- Total prize fund: £1,068,000
- Winner's share: £180,000
- Highest break: Alan McManus (SCO) (143)

Final
- Champion: Stephen Hendry (SCO)
- Runner-up: Jimmy White (ENG)
- Score: 18–17

The 1994 World Snooker Championship (also referred to as the 1994 Embassy World Snooker Championship) was a professional ranking snooker tournament that took place between 16 April and 2 May 1994 at the Crucible Theatre in Sheffield, England.

Stephen Hendry was the defending champion, having defeated Jimmy White 18–5 in the 1993 final. The two players reached the final again in 1994, and Hendry won 18–17 for his fourth world title.

Nine rounds of qualifying for the championship were held. The qualifying competition produced 16 players for the main stage, where they met the 16 seeded players. The tournament was broadcast in the United Kingdom on BBC2, and was sponsored by the Embassy cigarette brand. Hendry received £180,000 from a total prize fund of £1,068,000. The highest break of the main stage was 143, made by Alan McManus in the first round.

== Background ==
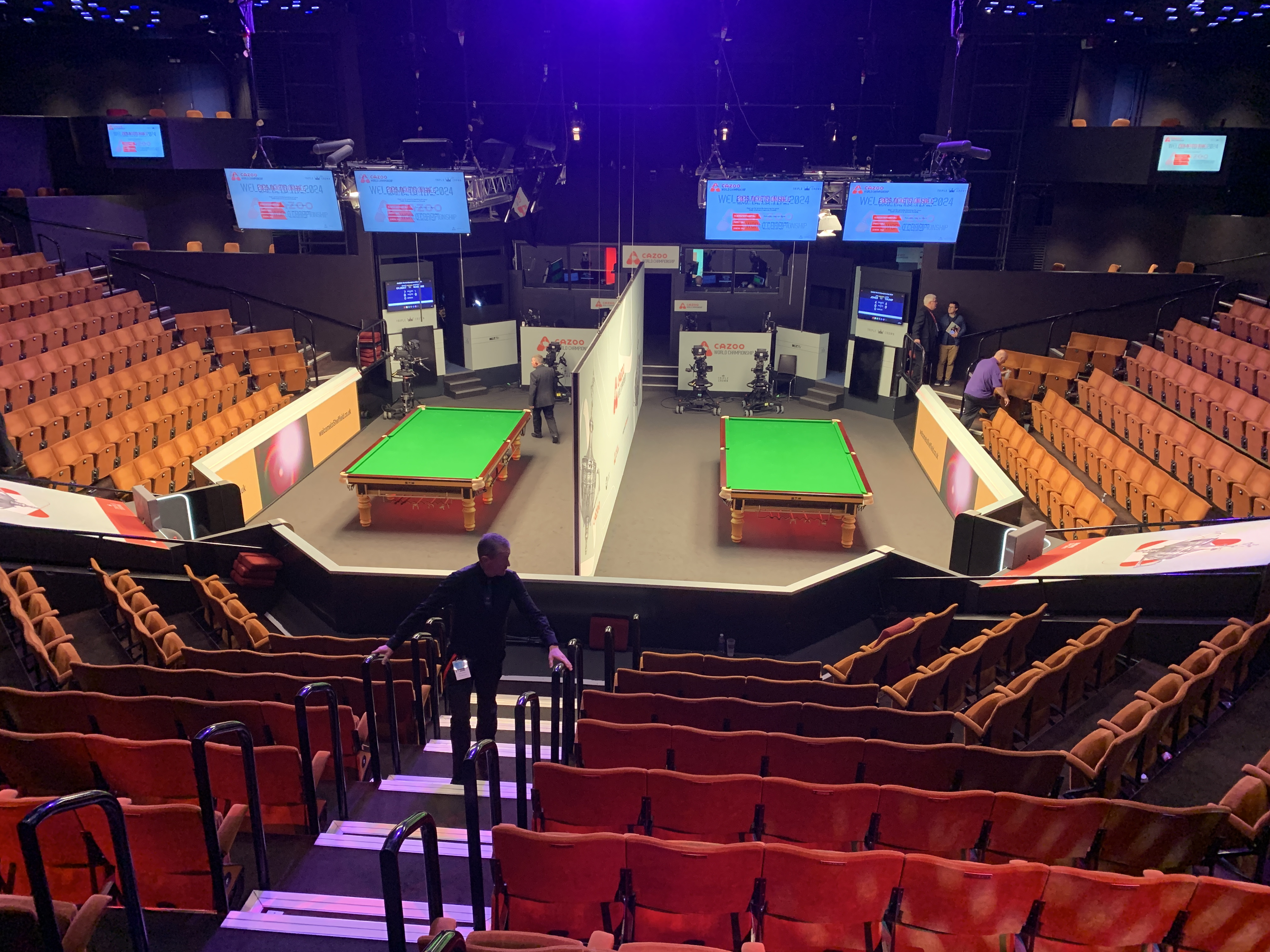
Setup of the arena at the Crucible Theatre, shown during the 2024 World Snooker Championship

The inaugural 1927 World Snooker Championship, then known as the Professional Championship of Snooker, took place at various venues in England between November 1926 and May 1927. Joe Davis won the final—held at Camkin's Hall in Birmingham from 9 to 12 May 1927—and went on to win the tournament 15 consecutive times before retiring undefeated after the 1946 edition (no tournaments were held from 1941 to 1945 because of World War II). The tournament went into abeyance after only two players contested the 1952 edition. The six editions of the World Professional Match-play Championship held between 1952 and 1957 are retroactively regarded as legitimate continuations of the World Snooker Championship, but that tournament was discontinued due to waning public interest in snooker in the post-war era. The world title was uncontested between 1958 and 1963.

Then-professional player Rex Williams was instrumental in reviving the World Snooker Championship on a challenge basis in 1964. John Pulman, winner of the 1957 World Professional Match-play Championship, defended the world title across seven challenge matches between 1964 and 1968. The World Snooker Championship reverted to an annual knockout tournament for the 1969 edition, marking the beginning of the championship's "modern era". The 1977 edition was the first staged at the Crucible Theatre in Sheffield, where it has remained since. As of 1994, the most successful players in the modern era were Ray Reardon and Steve Davis, each having won the title six times. Stephen Hendry was the tournament's youngest winner, having captured his first title at the 1990 event, aged 21 years and 106 days. Reardon was the oldest winner, having secured his sixth title at the 1978 event, aged 45 years and 203 days.

== Overview ==
The 1994 edition of the tournament—the 25th successive year that the World Snooker Championship was contested through the modern knockout format—took place from 16 April to 2 May at the Crucible Theatre in Sheffield, England, the 18th consecutive year that the World Championship was staged at the venue. Sponsored by cigarette brand Embassy, it was the ninth and last ranking tournament of the 1993–94 season, held after the British Open. The defending champion was Stephen Hendry, who had defeated Jimmy White 18–5 in the final of the 1993 World Championship to win the title.

=== Format ===
The top 16 players in the snooker world rankings were seeded through to the main stage at the Crucible Theatre. They faced 16 players who progressed through the qualifying rounds. First-round matches were played as the best of 19 frames, held over two sessions. Second-round and quarter-final matches were played as the best of 25 frames, held over three sessions. The semi-final matches were played as the best of 31 frames, held over four sessions. The final was the best of 35 frames, also held over four sessions.

=== Prize fund ===
The winner of the event received £180,000 from a total prize fund of £1,068,000. The breakdown of prize money is shown below:

- Winner: £180,000
- Runner-up: £110,000
- Semi-final: £55,000
- Quarter-final: £27,500
- Last 16: £15,000
- Last 32: £8,500
- Last 48: £6,000
- Last 64: £3,500
- Last 96: £1,750
- Last 128: £1,000
- Last 192: £650
- Stage one highest break: £5,000
- Stage two highest break: £15,400
- Stage two maximum break: £100,000
- Total: £1,068,000

== Summary ==
=== Qualifying ===
The qualifying competition took place at the Norbreck Hotel, Blackpool, from 8 to 28 January. The first four rounds were the best-of-nine frames and the later rounds were the best-of-19 frames. There were 26 century breaks during the first four rounds, including a total clearance of 141 by Jamie Burnett in his 5–4 fourth round defeat of Graham Cripsey. Leigh Robinson was on track to make the 19th maximum break of 147 in professional snooker in the third frame of his third round match against Norman Maher. Robinson lost position on the final blue ball and failed to pot it, finishing the break on 129. Neil Mosley, the reigning World Amateur Champion and English Amateur Champion, won through from round one to round five, as did World Under-21 Snooker amateur champion Robin Hull. World Women's champion Allison Fisher defeated Richard King 5–1 in round three but then lost 0–5 to David McLellan.

Karl Payne equalled the record for the highest break ever in a world championship qualifying match with a 143 in the 17th frame against Robert Chapman in round five. Although this gave him a 9–8 lead, he lost 9–10. In round six, John Higgins led Robinson 8–2 and 9–4 but lost 9–10.

The 1980 champion Cliff Thorburn and the 1972 and 1982 champion Alex Higgins each won three matches and qualified for the main stage for the first time since 1990. After his seventh round defeat of Stuart Pettman, Thorburn said "The big crowd is something that I always relish. That's why I want to get back to the Crucible so much. I want to get into a situation where I have to change my underpants, you get my drift?" In Higgins's final qualifying match, he was 3–6 down to Tony Knowles at the end of the first session. Higgins fell over a small wall while going to a pub during the interval, and gashed his left arm. As seeking medical attention would have made him late for the concluding session, he bandaged himself. During the match, small specks of blood from the wound fell onto the table.

The UK Champion, Ronnie O'Sullivan, defeated Tony Jones 10–8 after leading 9–5. Asian Open titleholder Dave Harold came back from 3–7 behind to beat Alain Robidoux 10–8, and Grand Prix champion Ebdon won 10–4 against Stefan Mazrocis. Joe Johnson, who won the title in 1986 and was runner-up in 1987, compiled a 107 break to level at 9–9 with Anthony Davies, but then lost the deciding frame. Doug Mountjoy led Les Dodd 9–5, but Dodd then won five consecutive frames to take the match.

Only two of the players seeded 17th to 32nd, Dene O'Kane and Peter Ebdon, qualified. Nine players qualified for the main stage for the first time: Davies, Harold, Gary Ponting, Surinder Gill, Mark Davis, Mark King, Billy Snaddon, Drew Henry and Fergal O'Brien. Gill, ranked 207th, was the lowest-ranked player to qualify, and Ponting was the only first-season professional to make it through to the main event. Payne's break of 143 was the highest of the qualifying rounds.

=== First round ===
The first round took place from 16 to 21 April, each match played as the best of 19 frames over two sessions.

Stephen Hendry produced two century breaks as he built an 8–1 lead against Gill in the first session. He added the two first frames of the second session to seal victory.

O'Sullivan led Dennis Taylor 5–4 after the first session. In the second, O'Sullivan produced breaks of 65, 69, 61, and 68 as he sealed a 10–6 victory. It was O'Sullivan's first win at the main stage of the World Championship and Taylor's last appearance at the Crucible. Taylor also lost his place in the top 16 of the rankings.

Trailing David Roe 3–6, Harold won the first five frames of the second session to take the lead. Roe then tied the scores at 8–8, but Harold produced breaks of 92 and 78 to advance to the second round.

Five-time runner-up Jimmy White led Snaddon 6–3 at the conclusion of the first session, aided by breaks of 107 and 112. After the resumption, Snaddon made a total clearance and two further half-centuries to tie the scores. White won the following four frames for a 10–6 victory. White attributed his win to "scoring heavily in the balls."

From 3–4 behind against John Parrott, Henry made a 133 break and also took the last frame of the first session to lead. Henry held a two-frame advantage at 6–4, 7–5, and 8–6. Parrott produced two half-centuries to level at 8–8, before Henry compiled a 112 break to go within one of victory. In the next frame, Henry was on a break of 66, but he suffered a kick when playing a red ball. White took the frame and then won the decider to advance to the second round. "The balls were kicking all day and I fancied something might happen because [Henry] hadn't had the white cleaned," Parrott said.

Resuming 5–2 ahead after the first session against Nigel Bond, Thorburn compiled a total clearance of 139 and further breaks of 89, 49, and 49 to win four consecutive frames. Bond took the remaining eight frames to progress. Thorburn said, "During the last three years I have buried four of my best friends and that puts snooker into perspective."

Steve James built an early 4–1 advantage against Dott, who then reduced the deficit to only one frame at the conclusion of the first session. James led 9–6, but Dodd won three consecutive frames to force a decider, which James took with a 63 break.

Ken Doherty was 6–3 in front against Alex Higgins after the first session. After the resumption, Doherty made a century break and also added the following frame to lead 8–3. Higgins took the next with an 83 break. In frame 13, Higgins was warned by referee John Williams for not playing on. Higgins complained that the referee was in his eye line and quarrelled with a member of the audience. Doherty went on to win 10–6. After the match, Higgins said, "The problem has arose lots of times. Some of the referees don't know how to walk backwards. I can with six Guinesses down me." Reporting for The Independent, Guy Hodgson wrote, "Controversy was stalking Higgins again, the difference being that it was not compensated for by his erstwhile, wonderful talent." It was the last time Higgins qualified for the main stage of the World Championship.

King led Darren Morgan 4–1, before Morgan eight consecutive frames, featuring one century. King took frame 14 with an 81 break, but Morgan sealed a 10–5 victory in the next. Morgan secured a place in the top 8 of the rankings for the following season.

Terry Griffiths, the 1979 World Champion, trailed Mark Davis 3–6 after the first session. The first two frames of the second session were shared, but Griffiths took the following six to advance.

Ebdon produced breaks of 78 and 124 as he took a one-frame lead in the first session against James Wattana, who was ill with a cold. Ebdon compiled a break of 64 at the start of the second session, but Wattana won six frames in a row for victory, constructing breaks of 63, 65, 100, and 54.

Facing Alan McManus, O'Brien made a century break in the opening frame. At the end of the first session, McManus led 6–3, and he extended his lead to 9–3, making breaks of 93 and 143. It was the highest break of his career so far. O'Brien narrowed the deficit by winning four consecutive frames, with breaks including 61 and 118. McManus took frame 17 on the final black ball to claim victory.

Willie Thorne won the first seven frames against Ponting, who had reached the main stage after progressing through nine rounds of qualifying. Thorne added the last frame of the first session and two more in the second to secure a 10–2 victory. Thorne said that having made it to the first round was a "miracle" for Ponting. "I realised he was struggling. I felt sorry for him, he really did look very ordinary in the first session," he said.

Facing O'Kane, Steve Davis built a 4–1 lead. O'Kane took the next frame with a 114 break, but Davis secured the next on a re-spotted black. The last frame of the first session was won by O'Kane, who trailed 3–5. Davis won the first frame of the second session on a re-spotted black and added the next four as well for a 10–3 result. Davis said the opening round of the main stage of the World Championship was the "big round" on the calendar. "No-one likes playing in it, everyone of us is uneasy, you only have to see the number of easy balls missed to realise it," he commented.

Martin Clark was two frames behind Brian Morgan at the end of the first session, but he produced breaks of 68, 139, and 102 as he took six of the first seven frames of the second session to go 9–6 in front. Morgan won the remaining four frames for victory.

Meeting Davis, Neal Foulds held leads of 5–2 and 8–4. He went on to win 10–7.

=== Second round ===
The second round took place from 21 to 25 April, each match played as the best of 25 frames over three sessions.

O'Sullivan, winner of the 1993 UK Championship and the 1994 British Open during the season, made an 86 break in the second frame against Parrott, who led 5–3 after the first session. After the resumption, Parrott took eight frames in a row to progress with a 13–3 result and a session to spare, manufacturing breaks including 61, 88, 89, and 94. Parrott said he enjoyed the "challenge" of facing O'Sullivan. "As long as you can match him break for break it makes him think. Over the best of nine frames, players like Ronnie are very difficult to stop. But this tournament is for thoroughbreds," he commented.

Before his match against Harold, Hendry suffered an accident in his hotel room and fractured his left arm below his elbow. Hendry said he felt "discomfort" when playing, but that it did not affect his cueing. He produced four half-centuries and a century as he took the first six frames. The sixth, a break of 73, was an attempt on a maximum which ended after ten reds and nine blacks. Harold secured the next with a 70, his highest break of the match, before Hendry won the last of the session. Harold added the first of the second session, but Hendry compiled breaks of 124, 51, 64, 70, and 60 as he won six more consecutive frames and completed a 13–2 victory.

Bond manufactured breaks of 81, 71, 86, and 73 as he took seven of the first eight frames. Griffiths reduced the deficit to four frames during the second session, but Bond took three in a row and led 11–5. The first two frames of the last session were shared. Griffiths then produced a 76 break and also took frame twenty to edge closer at 8–12, but Bond secured victory in the next.

Doherty led McManus 6–2 after the first session and extended his lead to six frames by adding the first two of the second session. McManus replied with three consecutive frames, compiling two half-centuries and a century, and he also took the last two to reduce the arrears to two at 7–9. Doherty won the first frame of the third session, but McManus replied with breaks of 83, 51, and 102 as he tied the scores. Doherty secured three of the following four frames to advance to the quarter-finals.

Facing Foulds, Jimmy White opened up a three-frame advantage at the beginning of the match. The following four frames were shared, before White produced a 66 break in the last of the session to lead 6–2. After the resumption, Foulds reduced the deficit winning back-to-back frames. White added the next, Foulds took the following two, and White produced a century break to go 8–6. Foulds produced a clearance up to the pink to win frame fifteen and also won the last of the day to tie the scores. White replied by winning the first three frames of the final session to lead 11–8. The players then exchanged the following frames, and so White won the match 13–10. Foulds thought White could win the tournament. "I know he's been in the final five times and not crossed the barrier but he is playing well enough to do it," he said.

Steve Davis led James 5–3 going into the second session. Davis produced only two half-centuries as he took eight consecutive frames to win the match with a session to spare.

Wattana, a semi-finalist the previous year, won the first frame against Brian Morgan, who then produced breaks of 134, 82, 70, and 57 as he took five in a row. The last two frames of the first session were shared. In the first frame of the second session, Morgan was on a break to expand his lead to five frames, but a pink ball he seemed to have potted bounced off the pocket and off the table. Wattana stole the frame. Morgan made breaks of 76 and 108 during the session, but Wattana took six of the eight frames played to level the scores. Morgan retook the lead at 9–8, before Wattana won the remaining five frames to seal a 13–9 victory.

Facing Thorne, Darren Morgan won the first three frames. Thorne took the fourth with breaks of 31 and 87, won the fifth on a re-spotted black, and added two more to take the lead. Morgan won the last of the session, so the scores were tied. The match was also level at 5–5, 6–6, 8–8, and 11–11. Morgan produced a 70 break to go within one of victory, but Thorne forced a decider by winning frame 24 on a re-spotted black. Two breaks of 38 in the deciding frame booked Morgan a place in the quarter-finals.

=== Quarter-finals ===
The quarter-finals took place on 26 and 27 April, each match played as the best of 25 frames over three sessions.

Hendry and Bond were tied at 2–2, before Hendry compiled breaks of 80, 98, and 50 as he took the remaining four frames of the first session. Bond won three consecutive frames in less than an hour to narrow the deficit to only one, but by the end of the second session he was again four behind. According to John Dee, reporting for The Daily Telegraph, Hendry "responded to a crisis with conviction and panache". Hendry then won three of the five frames played in the last session to secure victory. Hendry said he was feeling more pain from the injury he had sustained and that it was preventing him from bridging properly. "If I was one of Joe Public, I should be resting it for the next two weeks," he said.

Darren Morgan took the first three frames against Parrott, who replied with a 132 break in the fourth. Morgan then won three more frames on the trot, featuring a 115 break. In the last of the first session, Parrott constructed a 45 break. Morgan was then on a break of 49, but he missed a blue ball, allowing Parrott to get back in, win the frame, and reduce the arrears to four frames at 2–6. Parrott compiled breaks of 60 and 94 as he took six of the following eight frames to level the scores. Both players held leads in the final session. From 11–11, visits of 54 and 84 gave Morgan two consecutive frames and a place in the semi-finals.

Wattana faced Davis, whom he had defeated in the final of the 1994 Thailand Open. Davis produced five half-centuries to lead 6–2. The second session was shared, and from 10–6, the players exchanged frames and so Davis, who constructed contributions of 134 and 70, went on to win 13–9.

White led Doherty 5–3 after one session, and he then extended his lead by winning three consecutive frames after the resumption, aided by breaks of 86, 74, and 80. Doherty replied by taking three on the trot as well, featuring a century break in the third. The last two frames of the second session were shared. In the third, White again won three consecutive frames, before Doherty answered with three of his own to trail 10–12. White produced a break of 84 as he took frame 23 for victory.

=== Semi-finals ===
The semi-finals took place from 28 to 30 April, played as the best of 31 frames over four sessions.

White took a 3–0 early lead against Morgan. The following two frames were shared, before Morgan made a break of 96 and also took the last of the first session to narrow the deficit. After the resumption, White won two consecutive frames. Morgan took frame ten with a half-century, but White constructed breaks of 108 and 80 as he secured the remaining four of the session. White then led 11–4, 13–5, and, once three sessions had been played, 15–7. Morgan won the first frame of the fourth session, but White completed victory in the next, thanks to a 74 break.

Hendry and Davis had only met once at the Crucible, Davis winning 16–9 in the 1989 edition semi-finals. Davis won the opening frame with a 78 break and also took the second. Hendry replied by winning three frames in a row. The players then exchanged frames and were tied at the conclusion of the first session. Breaks of 57 and 90 gave Hendry a 6–4 lead, but Davis took four of the following six frames to half the deficit. He then won two consecutive frames to retake the lead at 9–8. Hendry manufactured two half-centuries as he won the remaining five frames of the session to lead 13–9. He also made a 120 break, the highest of the match, in the first frame of the final session, and then took the next two frames to seal victory with a 16–9 scoreline. This was Davis' eleventh and last appearance in a World Championship semi-final.

=== Final ===
The best-of-35-frame final took place over four sessions on 1 and 2 May between Hendry and White.

Hendry won his third consecutive world title and his fourth in five years.

It was White's fifth consecutive final appearance, his fourth against Hendry, and his sixth overall. "With every one of those defeats the suspicion has grown that he is destined to be the best player never to win the world title," Guy Hodgson wrote for The Independent.

White took the opening frame with contributions of 34 and 60. Hendry then compiled three half-centuries as he won five consecutive frames. White reduced the deficit by taking the last of the first session with a 63 break.

After the resumption, White won the first frame. Breaks of 58 and 61 allowed him to tie the scores at 5–5. He followed them with further breaks of 58 and 46 to make it five frames in a row and go two clear in front. He also compiled a half-century in frame 13, but Hendry won it with a visit of 63. The players exchanged frames and, after the second session, White was 9–7 in front.

Hendry added the first frame of the third session and compiled an 89 break to level the scores. White then won two consecutive frames, but Hendry replied with breaks of 53 and 87 to tie again. The last two frames of the session were shared.

From 12–12, Hendry took three of the first four frames of the final session. White halved the deficit with a 116 break, his highest of the match. Hendry won the next, but White took back-to-back frames to level at 16–16. Frame 33 went Hendry's way and White then constructed a 75 break to force a decider.

In the deciding frame, White was leading 37 points to 24 when he missed a black ball off its spot. Hendry cleared up to clinch the match and the title. This was White's last appearance in a World Championship final and the closest he ever came to winning the tournament.

David Vine asked White after the match, "Jimmy, what can I say, apart from 'Happy Birthday'?" White replied, smiling, that Hendry was "beginning to annoy me." For Brendan Cooper, author of Deep Pockets: Snooker and the Meaning of Life (2023), this "was the definitive distillation of the Jimmy White temperament; a philosophical archetype of the capacity to lose, and to lose well." David Hendon wrote in 2025 that the audience at the Crucible, who had been anticipating that White would win, were "subdued in their applause" and that "Even Hendry didn't particularly celebrate. It seemed everyone in the room was devastated. Apart from the man who should have been."

BBC coverage of the final attracted an average of 8.06 million viewers, with a peak of 13.4 million viewers during the final frame; the peak was slightly higher than the peak for the 1993 FA Cup final. Hendry received a £190,000 Bentley Continental R from Graham de Zille, owner of his sponsors Sweater Shop for winning. Hendry later wrote that he only drove the car twice, and that after some pedestrians had given him the "wanker" gesture he realised that the car did not align with his style; he placed it in a museum and then sold it after about a year. In the annual revision to the world rankings after the tournament, calculated on results over two years, Hendry retained top place for the fifth consecutive year, with 53,300 points, 1,000 more than second-placed Davis. White and Wattana both had 49,000 points, but Wattana took third place ahead of White because his performance over the more recent season had been better.

== Main draw ==
The draw for the main tournament is shown below. The numbers in parentheses after the players' names denote the seedings for the 16 seeded players. The match winners are shown in bold.

**First round** Best of 19 frames
16 April
**Stephen Hendry (SCO) (1)**	**10**
Surinder Gill (ENG)	1
16 & 17 April
David Roe (ENG) (16)	8
**Dave Harold (ENG)**	**10**
17 & 18 April
**Nigel Bond (ENG) (9)**	**10**
Cliff Thorburn (CAN)	9
18 & 19 April
**Terry Griffiths (WAL) (8)**	**10**
Mark Davis (ENG)	7
19 April
**James Wattana (THA) (5)**	**10**
Peter Ebdon (ENG)	6
20 & 21 April
Martin Clark (ENG) (12)	9
**Brian Morgan (ENG)**	**10**
17 & 18 April
**Steve James (ENG) (13)**	**10**
Les Dodd (ENG)	9
20 April
**Steve Davis (ENG) (4)**	**10**
Dene O'Kane (NZL)	3
16 & 17 April
**Jimmy White (ENG) (3)**	**10**
Billy Snaddon (SCO)	6
20 & 21 April
**Neal Foulds (ENG) (14)**	**10**
Anthony Davies (WAL)	7
18 April
**Ken Doherty (IRL) (11)**	**10**
Alex Higgins (NIR)	6
19 & 20 April
**Alan McManus (SCO) (6)**	**10**
Fergal O'Brien (IRL)	7
19 & 20 April
**Willie Thorne (ENG) (7)**	**10**
Gary Ponting (ENG)	2
18 & 19 April
**Darren Morgan (WAL) (10)**	**10**
Mark King (ENG)	5
16 April
Dennis Taylor (NIR) (15)	6
**Ronnie O'Sullivan (ENG)**	**10**
17 April
**John Parrott (ENG) (2)**	**10**
Drew Henry (SCO)	9

**Second round** Best of 25 frames
21 & 22 April
**Stephen Hendry (SCO) (1)**	**13**
Dave Harold (ENG)	2
22 & 23 April
**Nigel Bond (ENG) (9)**	**13**
Terry Griffiths (WAL) (8)	8
24 & 25 April
**James Wattana (THA) (5)**	**13**
Brian Morgan (ENG)	9
23 & 24 April
Steve James (ENG) (13)	3
**Steve Davis (ENG) (4)**	**13**
23, 24 & 25 April
**Jimmy White (ENG) (3)**	**13**
Neal Foulds (ENG) (14)	10
22 & 23 April
**Ken Doherty (IRL) (11)**	**13**
Alan McManus (SCO) (6)	11
24 & 25 April
Willie Thorne (ENG) (7)	12
**Darren Morgan (WAL) (10)**	**13**
21 & 22 April
Ronnie O'Sullivan (ENG)	3
**John Parrott (ENG) (2)**	**13**

**Quarter-finals**; Best of 25 frames
26 & 27 April
**Stephen Hendry (SCO) (1)**	**13**
Nigel Bond (ENG) (9)	8
26 & 27 April
James Wattana (THA) (5)	9
**Steve Davis (ENG) (4)**	**13**
26 & 27 April
**Jimmy White (ENG) (3)**	**13**
Ken Doherty (IRL) (11)	10
26 & 27 April
**Darren Morgan (WAL) (10)**	**13**
John Parrott (ENG) (2)	11

**Semi-finals**; Best of 31 frames
28, 29 & 30 April
**Stephen Hendry (SCO) (1)**	**16**
Steve Davis (ENG) (4)	9
28, 29 & 30 April
**Jimmy White (ENG) (3)**	**16**
Darren Morgan (WAL) (10)	8

**Final**; Best of 35 frames
1 & 2 May
**Stephen Hendry (SCO) (1)**	**18**
Jimmy White (ENG) (3)	17

=== Final: frame scores ===
Final: (Best of 35 frames) Crucible Theatre, Sheffield, 1 & 2 May 1994; Referee: John Williams
**Stephen Hendry (SCO)** (1)				**18**–17				Jimmy White (ENG) (3)			
Session 1: 5–2
Frame	1	2	3	4	5	6	7	8	9	10	11
Hendry	7	**64**^{†}	**89**^{†} (50)	**68**^{†}	**93**^{†} (80)	**76**^{†} (76)	1	N/A	N/A	N/A	N/A
White	**94**^{†} (60)	52	0	21	24	0	**85**^{†} (63)	N/A	N/A	N/A	N/A
Session 2: 2–7 (7–9)
Frame	1	2	3	4	5	6	7	8	9	10	11
Hendry	68 (57)	42	29	15	37	**71**^{†} (63)	59	**94**^{†} (66)	15	N/A	N/A
White	**70**^{†}	**85**^{†} (58)	**72**^{†} (61)	**110**^{†} (58)	**84**^{†}	54 (54)	**60**^{†}	27	**64**^{†}	N/A	N/A
Session 3: 5–3 (12–12)
Frame	1	2	3	4	5	6	7	8	9	10	11
Hendry	**71**^{†}	**89**^{†} (89)	0	25	**73**^{†} (53)	**88**^{†} (87)	53	**72**^{†} (52)	N/A	N/A	N/A
White	26	0	**77**^{†} (77)	**69**^{†}	4	13	**64**^{†}	34	N/A	N/A	N/A
Session 4: 6–5 (**18**–17)
Frame	1	2	3	4	5	6	7	8	9	10	11
Hendry	56	**68**^{†}	**66**^{†}	**67**^{†}	0	**72**^{†}	66 (51)	66	**68**^{†}	0	**82**^{†} (58)
White	**61**^{†}	31	34	34	**116**^{†} (116)	39	**71**^{†}	**67**^{†}	0	**85**^{†} (75)	37
89				Highest break				116			
0				Century breaks				1			
12				50+ breaks				9			
Stephen Hendry wins the 1994 World Snooker Championship; Breaks over 50 are shown in parentheses.^{†} = Winner of frame

== Qualifying results ==
Nine qualifying rounds were played.

=== Rounds 1–6 ===
Results for rounds 1 to 6 are shown below.

First qualifying round Best of 9 frames
Stephen Kershaw (ENG)	5
Ramu Vaswani (ENG)	2
Wayne Saidler (ENG)	5
Alfonso Bellusci (ENG)	2
Lee Marney (ENG)	5
Craig McDonald (SCO)	2
Michael O'Sullivan (ENG)	5
Philip Williams (WAL)	4
Mario Fernandez (IRE)	5
David Lazenby (ENG)	0
Martin O'Neill (NIR)	5
Gareth Esprit (ENG)	1
Chris Taylor (ENG)	5
Craig Barber (ENG)	1
Kevin Johnstone (ENG)	5
Gareth Chilcott (WAL)	4
John Bedford (ENG)	5
Shaun Berry (ENG)	0
Declan Hughes (NIR)	5
Andrew Alexandrou (ENG)	3
Darren Dodd (ENG)	5
Paul Thomerson (ENG)	3
Robin Hull (ENG)	5
Paul Clarke (ENG)	1
Andrew Radford (ENG)	5
Dennis Hughes (ENG)	3
Andrew Craig (ENG)	5
Paul McDonald (ENG)	3
Craig Bradshaw (ENG)	5
Frank Fitzgerald (ENG)	1
Martin Lee (ENG)	5
Robert Grenville-Smith (ENG)	4
Richard Davis (ENG)	5
Craig Glanville (ENG)	1
Mario Geudens (BEL)	5
David Mellon (ENG)	0
Neil Mosley (ENG)	5
Chris Achilles (ENG)	1
Julian Mills (ENG)	5
Matthew McGrotty (ENG)	3
Matt Wilson (ENG)	5
Elliott Clark (ENG)	2
Wilfred Dijkstra (NED)	5
Jason Curtis (ENG)	1
Scott Bigham (SCO)	5
Jonathan White (ENG)	0
Matthew Catchpole (ENG)	5
John Clouden (ENG)	4
John Kemp (SCO)	5
Peter Bullen (BEL)	4
Michael Duffy (NIR)	5
Stephen Popplewell (ENG)	1
Jason Scott (ENG)	w/o
Nicholas Segal (ENG)	w/d
Andrew Essilfie (ENG)	5
Stephen Waldron (ENG)	1
Matt Bayley (ENG)	5
Ronnie Shakespeare (ENG)	0
Martin Dziewialtowski (SCO)	5
Darren Holdcroft (ENG)	4
John Bayliss (ENG)	5
Del Smith (ENG)	1
Geoff Williams (ENG)	5
Matthew Spade (ENG)	4
Darren Paris (SWI)	5
David Mole (ENG)	2
Stephen Taylor (ENG)	5
Andrew Krasinski (ENG)	3
Tim Dunphy (IRE)	5
Darren Skinner (ENG)	4
Tim Bailey (ENG)	5
Mario Wehrmann (NED)	0
Darren Martin (ENG)	5
Rogelio Esteiro (ENG)	1
Ian Bullimore (ENG)	5
Lun Wai Lee (ENG)	3
Roberto Frezza (ITA)	5
Donald Newcombe (WAL)	4
Chris Archer (ENG)	5
Andrew Milliard (ENG)	2
Alistair Fleming (SCO)	5
Simon Smith (ENG)	1
Alan Edmonds (ENG)	5
Christopher Flight (ENG)	0
Damon Zeid (ENG)	5
Ashot Potikyan (RUS)	3
Paul Sweeny (ENG)	5
Brett Patmore (ENG)	3
Stuart Henderson (ENG)	5
Matthew Farrant (WAL)	4
David Thompson (ENG)	5
Tony Brown (ENG)	2
Patrick Delsemme (BEL)	5
Huseyin Hursid (TUR)	3
Tom Bell (ENG)	5
Paul Smith (ENG)	3
Joe Canny (IRE)	5
Dave Andrew (ENG)	0
Gary Ponting (ENG)	5
Richard Batty (ENG)	0
Lee Walters (ENG)	5
Edvard Matthiasson (ISL)	1
Darren Shaw (ENG)	5
Ian McCulloch (ENG)	2
Andrew Atkinson (ENG)	5
Joe Patterson (SCO)	0
Daniel Buskin (ENG)	5
Alex Peart (JAM)	1
Neil Wood (ENG)	5
Jimmy O'Shea (ENG)	0
Mario Vassallo (MLT)	5
Andrew Photiou (ENG)	2
Gerard Greene (NIR)	5
Mark Whatley (ENG)	4
Darren Mirza (ENG)	5
Clive Bernstone (ENG)	0
Jeffrey Moore (ENG)	5
Mark Ganderton (ENG)	0
Grant Peabody (ENG)	5
Bjorn Haneveer (BEL)	2
James McGouran (ENG)	5
Robert Thallon (SCO)	0
Daniele Zagaroli (ITA)	5
Jayson Morris (ENG)	2

Second qualifying round Best of 9 frames
Steve Whalley (ENG)	5
Stephen Kershaw (ENG)	4
Peter McCullagh (ENG)	5
Wayne Saidler (ENG)	1
Matthew Couch (ENG)	5
Lee Marney (ENG)	4
Michael Leach (ENG)	w/d
Michael O'Sullivan (ENG)	w/o
Leigh Robinson (ENG)	5
Mario Fernandez (IRE)	3
Craig Harrison (ENG)	1
Martin O'Neill (NIR)	5
Steven Evans (ENG)	5
Chris Taylor (ENG)	0
Philip Minchin (ENG)	w/d
Kevin Johnstone (ENG)	w/o
Stuart Pettman (ENG)	5
John Bedford (ENG)	0
Nick Marsh (ENG)	3
Declan Hughes (NIR)	5
Richard Culham (ENG)	5
Darren Dodd (ENG)	0
Jamie Rous (ENG)	0
Robin Hull (ENG)	5
Richard King (ENG)	5
Andrew Radford (ENG)	0
Darren Lennox (IRL)	5
Andrew Craig (ENG)	2
Neil Selman (ENG)	5
Craig Bradshaw (ENG)	2
Julian Goodyear (ENG)	5
Martin Lee (ENG)	1
Steve Archer (ENG)	5
Richard Davis (ENG)	2
Geet Sethi (IND)	w/d
Mario Geudens (BEL)	w/o
Andrew Hannah (ENG)	3
Neil Mosley (ENG)	5
Eddie Lott (ENG)	5
Julian Mills (ENG)	3
Jonathan Bagley (ENG)	2
Matt Wilson (ENG)	5
Steven Cook (ENG)	4
Wilfred Dijkstra (NED)	5
David Rice (ENG)	1
Scott Bigham (SCO)	5
Graham Stevens (ENG)	3
Matthew Catchpole (ENG)	5
Paul Hefford (ENG)	4
John Kemp (SCO)	5
David Wilson (ENG)	5
Michael Duffy (NIR)	2
Karen Corr (NIR)	2
Jason Scott (ENG)	5
Gerry Jones (IRL)	1
Andrew Essilfie (ENG)	5
Paul Davison (ENG)	5
Matt Bayley (ENG)	3
David Buskin (ENG)	3
Martin Dziewialtowski (SCO)	5
Richy McDonald (SCO)	5
John Bayliss (ENG)	3
James Vicarey (ENG)	0
Geoff Williams (ENG)	5
Hassan Vaizie (ENG)	5
Darren Paris (SWI)	4
Sefton Payne (ENG)	5
Stephen Taylor (ENG)	4
John Knipe (ENG)	w/d
Tim Dunphy (IRE)	w/o
Ian Hurdman (ENG)	1
Tim Bailey (ENG)	5
Anthony Buckley (ENG)	3
Darren Martin (ENG)	5
Mark Williams (ENG)	1
Ian Bullimore (ENG)	5
Noppadon Noppachorn (THA)	5
Roberto Frezza (ITA)	3
Anthony Halpin (ENG)	5
Chris Archer (ENG)	4
David Singh (IND)	5
Alistair Fleming (SCO)	4
David Athorn (ENG)	0
Alan Edmonds (ENG)	5
Michael Kirkham (ENG)	5
Damon Zeid (ENG)	4
Stuart Mann (ENG)	2
Paul Sweeny (ENG)	5
Norman MacLachlan (SCO)	3
Stuart Henderson (ENG)	5
Mark O'Sullivan (IRL)	5
David Thompson (ENG)	4
Nick Jones (WAL)	4
Patrick Delsemme (BEL)	5
Justin Buckingham (ENG)	3
Tom Bell (ENG)	5
John Leahy (IRL)	0
Joe Canny (IRE)	5
Stephen Roberts (ENG)	2
Gary Ponting (ENG)	5
Mike Smith (ENG)	4
Lee Walters (ENG)	5
John Manley (ENG)	5
Darren Shaw (ENG)	2
Bernard Bennett (ENG)	0
Andrew Atkinson (ENG)	5
Stuart Parnell (ENG)	5
Daniel Buskin (ENG)	2
Hitesh Lakhani (ENG)	2
Neil Wood (ENG)	5
Paul Florence (ENG)	5
Mario Vassallo (MLT)	3
Lyndon Smith (ENG)	0
Gerard Greene (NIR)	5
Shane Haines (ENG)	5
Darren Mirza (ENG)	1
Anthony Taylor (ENG)	5
Jeffrey Moore (ENG)	3
Philip Seaton (ENG)	5
Grant Peabody (ENG)	2
Steve Harrison (ENG)	5
James McGouran (ENG)	4
Darren Limburg (ENG)	1
Daniele Zagaroli (ITA)	5
Kevin Lownds (ENG)	5
Kevin Brown (ENG)	4
Roy Bigg (ENG)	5
Joe Perry (ENG)	2

Third qualifying round Best of 9 frames
John Shilton (ENG)	4
Steve Whalley (ENG)	5
Surinder Gill (ENG)	5
Peter McCullagh (ENG)	1
Robert Tavagna (AUS)	2
Matthew Couch (ENG)	5
Jack Fitzmaurice (ENG)	5
Michael O'Sullivan (ENG)	2
Norman Maher (WAL)	2
Leigh Robinson (ENG)	5
Pat Horne (ENG)	2
Martin O'Neill (NIR)	5
Jason Walton (ENG)	5
Steven Evans (ENG)	2
John Burns (ENG)	5
Kevin Johnstone (ENG)	2
Mark Gray (ENG)	3
Stuart Pettman (ENG)	5
Steve Elliott (ENG)	5
Declan Hughes (NIR)	4
Tom Finstad (CAN)	5
Richard Culham (ENG)	3
Jimmy Long (IRL)	2
Robin Hull (ENG)	5
Allison Fisher (ENG)	5
Richard King (ENG)	1
Garry Baldrey (ENG)	5
Darren Lennox (IRL)	3
Micky Roughan (IRL)	3
Neil Selman (ENG)	5
Michael Judge (IRL)	5
Julian Goodyear (ENG)	2
Jamie Burnett (SCO)	5
Steve Archer (ENG)	3
Stacey Hillyard (ENG)	4
Mario Geudens (BEL)	5
Roger Leighton (ENG)	1
Neil Mosley (ENG)	5
David Coles (ENG)	3
Eddie Lott (ENG)	5
Daniel Smith (ENG)	1
Matt Wilson (ENG)	5
John Dunning (ENG)	1
Wilfred Dijkstra (NED)	5
Lee Richardson (ENG)	1
Scott Bigham (SCO)	5
Wayne Lloyd (WAL)	1
Matthew Catchpole (ENG)	5
Daryl Peach (ENG)	5
John Kemp (SCO)	4
Nick Pearce (ENG)	2
David Wilson (ENG)	5
John Timson (ENG)	3
Jason Scott (ENG)	5
Tommy Murphy (NIR)	1
Andrew Essilfie (ENG)	5
Gabriel Burns (IRL)	1
Paul Davison (ENG)	5
Paul Morgan (ENG)	4
Martin Dziewialtowski (SCO)	5
Simon Parker (ENG)	1
Richy McDonald (SCO)	5
Chris Scanlon (ENG)	5
Geoff Williams (ENG)	2
Richard Pincott (ENG)	2
Hassan Vaizie (ENG)	5
Jason Pegram (ENG)	1
Sefton Payne (ENG)	5
Steve Russell (ENG)	4
Tim Dunphy (IRE)	5
Frank Maskell (ENG)	5
Tim Bailey (ENG)	2
Peter Gilchrist (ENG)	5
Darren Martin (ENG)	1
Carl Waters (ENG)	5
Ian Bullimore (ENG)	0
Will Jerram (ENG)	1
Noppadon Noppachorn (THA)	5
Eddie Manning (ENG)	5
Anthony Halpin (ENG)	0
Nic Barrow (ENG)	5
David Singh (IND)	4
Suriya Suwannasingh (THA)	5
Alan Edmonds (ENG)	1
Lee Grant (ENG)	5
Michael Kirkham (ENG)	0
Colin Kelly (ENG)	5
Paul Sweeny (ENG)	2
John Lardner (SCO)	5
Stuart Henderson (ENG)	4
Jamie Bodle (ENG)	0
Mark O'Sullivan (IRL)	5
Neil Tomkins (WAL)	2
Patrick Delsemme (BEL)	5
Antony Bolsover (ENG)	5
Tom Bell (ENG)	1
Roger Garrett (ENG)	5
Joe Canny (IRE)	3
Mukesh Parmar (ENG)	4
Gary Ponting (ENG)	5
Paul S. Davison (ENG)	0
Lee Walters (ENG)	5
Anton Bishop (ENG)	5
John Manley (ENG)	3
Michael Valentine (SCO)	4
Andrew Atkinson (ENG)	5
Dean Venables (ENG)	1
Stuart Parnell (ENG)	5
Jonathan Saunders (ENG)	5
Neil Wood (ENG)	3
Ian Sargeant (WAL)	5
Paul Florence (ENG)	4
Darren Guest (ENG)	4
Gerard Greene (NIR)	5
Graham Fisken (ENG)	3
Shane Haines (ENG)	5
Gary Peters (WAL)	5
Anthony Taylor (ENG)	2
Michael Gold (ENG)	0
Philip Seaton (ENG)	5
Iwan Jones (WAL)	5
Steve Harrison (ENG)	0
Karl Townsend (ENG)	5
Daniele Zagaroli (ITA)	0
Mike Dunn (ENG)	5
Kevin Lownds (ENG)	1
Robert Chapman (ENG)	5
Roy Bigg (ENG)	1

Fourth qualifying round Best of 9 frames
Dermot McGlinchey (NIR)	5
Steve Whalley (ENG)	4
Ray Edmonds (ENG)	3
Surinder Gill (ENG)	5
Alex Borg (MLT)	2
Matthew Couch (ENG)	5
David Rippon (ENG)	5
Jack Fitzmaurice (ENG)	2
Barry Bunn (ENG)	1
Leigh Robinson (ENG)	5
Graham MacDonald (ENG)	1
Martin O'Neill (NIR)	5
Frank Dezi (ENG)	1
Jason Walton (ENG)	5
Graham Horne (SCO)	4
John Burns (ENG)	5
Terry Murphy (ENG)	1
Stuart Pettman (ENG)	5
Steve Prest (ENG)	5
Steve Elliott (ENG)	2
Chris Cookson (ENG)	0
Tom Finstad (CAN)	5
Amrik Cheema (IND)	3
Robin Hull (ENG)	5
David McLellan (SCO)	5
Allison Fisher (ENG)	0
Kevin Ashby (ENG)	5
Garry Baldrey (ENG)	0
Steve Lemmens (BEL)	5
Neil Selman (ENG)	1
Paul Wykes (ENG)	2
Michael Judge (IRL)	5
Graham Cripsey (ENG)	4
Jamie Burnett (SCO)	5
Robert Foxall (ENG)	2
Mario Geudens (BEL)	5
Darryn Walker (ENG)	4
Neil Mosley (ENG)	5
Paul Cavney (ENG)	5
Eddie Lott (ENG)	2
Karl Burrows (ENG)	3
Matt Wilson (ENG)	5
Wayne Rendle (ENG)	5
Wilfred Dijkstra (NED)	3
Spencer Dunn (ENG)	2
Scott Bigham (SCO)	5
Darren Hackeson (ENG)	5
Matthew Catchpole (ENG)	4
Nick Walker (ENG)	5
Daryl Peach (ENG)	3
Bradley Jones (ENG)	5
David Wilson (ENG)	1
Nick Fruin (ENG)	4
Jason Scott (ENG)	5
Stuart Reardon (ENG)	5
Andrew Essilfie (ENG)	2
Darren Clarke (ENG)	5
Paul Davison (ENG)	1
Gary Natale (CAN)	4
Martin Dziewialtowski (SCO)	5
Simon Morris (ENG)	3
Richy McDonald (SCO)	5
Ian Williamson (ENG)	5
Chris Scanlon (ENG)	2
Tony Rampello (ENG)	5
Hassan Vaizie (ENG)	4
Craig MacGillivray (SCO)	2
Sefton Payne (ENG)	5
Gary Lees (ENG)	5
Tim Dunphy (IRE)	1
Yasin Merchant (IND)	5
Frank Maskell (ENG)	2
Marcus Campbell (SCO)	0
Peter Gilchrist (ENG)	5
Mark Flowerdew (ENG)	5
Carl Waters (ENG)	0
Sergio Beggiato (ENG)	4
Noppadon Noppachorn (THA)	5
Anthony O'Connor (IRE)	2
Eddie Manning (ENG)	5
Dave Gilbert (ENG)	5
Nic Barrow (ENG)	2
David Grimwood (ENG)	1
Suriya Suwannasingh (THA)	5
Dominic Dale (WAL)	5
Lee Grant (ENG)	1
Dylan Leary (NIR)	4
Colin Kelly (ENG)	5
Oliver King (ENG)	5
John Lardner (SCO)	2
Matt Gibson (SCO)	1
Mark O'Sullivan (IRL)	5
Mick Fisher (ENG)	5
Patrick Delsemme (BEL)	4
Sean Lynskey (ENG)	3
Antony Bolsover (ENG)	5
Jason Wallace (ENG)	0
Roger Garrett (ENG)	5
Jim Donnelly (SCO)	2
Gary Ponting (ENG)	5
Adrian Rosa (ENG)	5
Lee Walters (ENG)	4
John Giles (ENG)	2
Anton Bishop (ENG)	5
Leigh Griffin (ENG)	3
Andrew Atkinson (ENG)	5
Daniel Murphy (ENG)	5
Stuart Parnell (ENG)	3
Mark King (ENG)	5
Jonathan Saunders (ENG)	3
Colin Morton (ENG)	2
Ian Sargeant (WAL)	5
Scott MacFarlane (SCO)	0
Gerard Greene (NIR)	5
Jeff Cundy (ENG)	5
Shane Haines (ENG)	2
Mark Boyd (ENG)	1
Gary Peters (WAL)	5
Bjorn L'Orange (NOR)	5
Philip Seaton (ENG)	1
Guy Dennis (ENG)	5
Iwan Jones (WAL)	4
Steve Mifsud (AUS)	5
Karl Townsend (ENG)	4
Cary Kikis (ENG)	w/d
Mike Dunn (ENG)	w/o
Joe Delaney (IRE)	3
Robert Chapman (ENG)	5

Fifth qualifying round Best of 19 frames
Steve Judd (ENG)	10
Dermot McGlinchey (NIR)	5
Brady Gollan (CAN)	w/d
Surinder Gill (ENG)	w/o
Tony Wilson (IOM)	5
Matthew Couch (ENG)	10
Robert Marshall (ENG)	10
David Rippon (ENG)	8
Jamie Woodman (ENG)	6
Leigh Robinson (ENG)	10
John Higgins (SCO)	10
Martin O'Neill (NIR)	6
John Rea (SCO)	3
Jason Walton (ENG)	10
Bob Harris (ENG)	5
John Burns (ENG)	10
John Read (ENG)	4
Stuart Pettman (ENG)	10
Euan Henderson (SCO)	10
Steve Prest (ENG)	6
Steve Meakin (ENG)	10
Tom Finstad (CAN)	5
Jimmy Michie (ENG)	10
Robin Hull (ENG)	6
Rex Williams (ENG)	4
David McLellan (SCO)	10
Mark Davis (ENG)	10
Kevin Ashby (ENG)	4
Bill Oliver (ENG)	4
Steve Lemmens (BEL)	10
Steve Campbell (ENG)	5
Michael Judge (IRL)	10
Stefan Mazrocis (ENG)	10
Jamie Burnett (SCO)	7
Chris Small (SCO)	10
Mario Geudens (BEL)	4
Paul McPhillips (SCO)	9
Neil Mosley (ENG)	10
Paddy Browne (IRE)	5
Paul Cavney (ENG)	10
Jim Chambers (ENG)	10
Matt Wilson (ENG)	9
Troy Shaw (ENG)	8
Wayne Rendle (ENG)	10
Jason Weston (ENG)	10
Scott Bigham (SCO)	7
Steve Duggan (ENG)	10
Darren Hackeson (ENG)	9
Stephen O'Connor (IRE)	8
Nick Walker (ENG)	10
Ian Brumby (ENG)	8
Bradley Jones (ENG)	10
Craig Edwards (ENG)	10
Jason Scott (ENG)	6
David Taylor (ENG)	10
Stuart Reardon (ENG)	8
Paul Gibson (ENG)	10
Darren Clarke (ENG)	4
Joe Grech (MLT)	10
Martin Dziewialtowski (SCO)	6
Stephen Lee (ENG)	10
Richy McDonald (SCO)	4
Warren King (AUS)	10
Ian Williamson (ENG)	5
Jason Whittaker (ENG)	9
Tony Rampello (ENG)	10
Murdo MacLeod (SCO)	9
Sefton Payne (ENG)	10
Mark Williams (WAL)	10
Gary Lees (ENG)	8
Karl Broughton (ENG)	9
Yasin Merchant (IND)	10
Dave Martin (ENG)	9
Peter Gilchrist (ENG)	10
Anthony Davies (WAL)	10
Mark Flowerdew (ENG)	7
Barry West (ENG)	3
Noppadon Noppachorn (THA)	10
Anthony Harris (ENG)	8
Eddie Manning (ENG)	10
Paul Medati (ENG)	7
Dave Gilbert (ENG)	10
Andrew Cairns (ENG)	10
Suriya Suwannasingh (THA)	4
Colin Roscoe (WAL)	3
Dominic Dale (WAL)	10
Joe O'Boye (IRE)	9
Colin Kelly (ENG)	10
Mehmet Husnu (CYP)	6
Oliver King (ENG)	10
Shokat Ali (PAK)	3
Mark O'Sullivan (IRL)	10
Peter Daubney (ENG)	10
Mick Fisher (ENG)	1
Fergal O'Brien (IRE)	10
Antony Bolsover (ENG)	2
Barry Pinches (ENG)	10
Roger Garrett (ENG)	9
David McDonnell (IRE)	9
Gary Ponting (ENG)	10
Shaun Mellish (ENG)	4
Adrian Rosa (ENG)	10
Pat Kenny (ENG)	6
Anton Bishop (ENG)	10
Ken Owers (ENG)	4
Andrew Atkinson (ENG)	10
Sean Lanigan (ENG)	10
Daniel Murphy (ENG)	6
Paul Tanner (ENG)	3
Mark King (ENG)	10
Brian Rowswell (ENG)	10
Ian Sargeant (WAL)	7
Mark Rowing (ENG)	10
Gerard Greene (NIR)	8
Steve Longworth (ENG)	5
Jeff Cundy (ENG)	10
Peter Lines (ENG)	8
Gary Peters (WAL)	10
Nick Dyson (ENG)	w/d
Bjorn L'Orange (NOR)	w/o
Robby Foldvari (AUS)	7
Guy Dennis (ENG)	10
Sean Storey (ENG)	10
Steve Mifsud (AUS)	6
Jason Smith (ENG)	5
Mike Dunn (ENG)	10
Karl Payne (ENG)	9
Robert Chapman (ENG)	10

Sixth qualifying round Best of 19 frames
Steve Judd (ENG)	6
Surinder Gill (ENG)	10
Matthew Couch (ENG)	10
Robert Marshall (ENG)	2
Leigh Robinson (ENG)	10
John Higgins (SCO)	9
Jason Walton (ENG)	9
John Burns (ENG)	10
Stuart Pettman (ENG)	10
Euan Henderson (SCO)	3
Steve Meakin (ENG)	6
Jimmy Michie (ENG)	10
David McLellan (SCO)	4
Mark Davis (ENG)	10
Steve Lemmens (BEL)	6
Michael Judge (IRL)	10
Stefan Mazrocis (ENG)	10
Chris Small (SCO)	5
Neil Mosley (ENG)	2
Paul Cavney (ENG)	10
Jim Chambers (ENG)	10
Wayne Rendle (ENG)	8
Jason Weston (ENG)	10
Steve Duggan (ENG)	5
Nick Walker (ENG)	8
Bradley Jones (ENG)	10
Craig Edwards (ENG)	10
David Taylor (ENG)	6
Paul Gibson (ENG)	9
Joe Grech (MLT)	10
Stephen Lee (ENG)	10
Warren King (AUS)	3
Tony Rampello (ENG)	8
Sefton Payne (ENG)	10
Mark Williams (WAL)	10
Yasin Merchant (IND)	4
Peter Gilchrist (ENG)	2
Anthony Davies (WAL)	10
Noppadon Noppachorn (THA)	10
Eddie Manning (ENG)	8
Dave Gilbert (ENG)	4
Andrew Cairns (ENG)	10
Dominic Dale (WAL)	5
Colin Kelly (ENG)	10
Oliver King (ENG)	6
Mark O'Sullivan (IRL)	10
Peter Daubney (ENG)	4
Fergal O'Brien (IRE)	10
Barry Pinches (ENG)	5
Gary Ponting (ENG)	10
Adrian Rosa (ENG)	10
Anton Bishop (ENG)	1
Andrew Atkinson (ENG)	2
Sean Lanigan (ENG)	10
Mark King (ENG)	10
Brian Rowswell (ENG)	2
Mark Rowing (ENG)	6
Jeff Cundy (ENG)	10
Gary Peters (WAL)	6
Bjorn L'Orange (NOR)	10
Guy Dennis (ENG)	7
Sean Storey (ENG)	10
Mike Dunn (ENG)	10
Robert Chapman (ENG)	6

Note: w/o = walkover; w/d = withdrawn

=== Rounds 7–9 ===
Results for rounds 7 to 9 are shown below.

Seventh qualifying round Best of 19 frames
Jonathan Birch (ENG)	7
Surinder Gill (ENG)	10
Peter Francisco (RSA)	4
Matthew Couch (ENG)	10
Wayne Jones (WAL)	10
Leigh Robinson (ENG)	9
Dave Harold (ENG)	10
John Burns (ENG)	0
Cliff Thorburn (CAN)	10
Stuart Pettman (ENG)	7
Rod Lawler (ENG)	10
Jimmy Michie (ENG)	3
Stephen Murphy (IRE)	2
Mark Davis (ENG)	10
Jim Wych (CAN)	10
Michael Judge (IRL)	5
Paul Davies (WAL)	5
Stefan Mazrocis (ENG)	10
Nick Terry (ENG)	10
Paul Cavney (ENG)	8
Brian Morgan (ENG)	10
Jim Chambers (ENG)	5
Danny Fowler (ENG)	8
Jason Weston (ENG)	10
Nigel Gilbert (ENG)	10
Bradley Jones (ENG)	4
Les Dodd (ENG)	10
Craig Edwards (ENG)	7
Anthony Hamilton (ENG)	10
Joe Grech (MLT)	8
Tony Meo (ENG)	3
Stephen Lee (ENG)	10
Steve Newbury (WAL)	10
Sefton Payne (ENG)	9
Billy Snaddon (SCO)	10
Mark Williams (WAL)	6
Ian Graham (ENG)	4
Anthony Davies (WAL)	10
Jack McLaughlin (NIR)	1
Noppadon Noppachorn (THA)	10
Eddie Charlton (AUS)	3
Andrew Cairns (ENG)	10
Alex Higgins (NIR)	10
Colin Kelly (ENG)	9
Cliff Wilson (WAL)	9
Mark O'Sullivan (IRL)	10
Tony Chappel (WAL)	5
Fergal O'Brien (IRE)	10
Bob Chaperon (CAN)	5
Gary Ponting (ENG)	10
Eugene Hughes (IRE)	4
Adrian Rosa (ENG)	10
Jason Prince (NIR)	6
Sean Lanigan (ENG)	10
Silvino Francisco (RSA)	3
Mark King (ENG)	10
Ronnie O'Sullivan (ENG)	10
Jeff Cundy (ENG)	4
Andy Hicks (ENG)	10
Bjorn L'Orange (NOR)	6
David Finbow (ENG)	8
Sean Storey (ENG)	10
Drew Henry (SCO)	10
Mike Dunn (ENG)	2

Eighth qualifying round Best of 19 frames
Surinder Gill (ENG)	10
Matthew Couch (ENG)	8
Wayne Jones (WAL)	8
Dave Harold (ENG)	10
Cliff Thorburn (CAN)	10
Rod Lawler (ENG)	5
Mark Davis (ENG)	10
Jim Wych (CAN)	4
Stefan Mazrocis (ENG)	10
Nick Terry (ENG)	8
Brian Morgan (ENG)	10
Jason Weston (ENG)	3
Nigel Gilbert (ENG)	3
Les Dodd (ENG)	10
Anthony Hamilton (ENG)	6
Stephen Lee (ENG)	10
Steve Newbury (WAL)	4
Billy Snaddon (SCO)	10
Anthony Davies (WAL)	10
Noppadon Noppachorn (THA)	8
Andrew Cairns (ENG)	5
Alex Higgins (NIR)	10
Mark O'Sullivan (IRL)	9
Fergal O'Brien (IRE)	10
Gary Ponting (ENG)	10
Adrian Rosa (ENG)	6
Sean Lanigan (ENG)	8
Mark King (ENG)	10
Ronnie O'Sullivan (ENG)	10
Andy Hicks (ENG)	8
Sean Storey (ENG)	5
Drew Henry (SCO)	10

Ninth qualifying round Best of 19 frames
Mark Bennett (WAL)	7
Surinder Gill (ENG)	10
Alain Robidoux (CAN)	8
Dave Harold (ENG)	10
Tony Drago (MLT)	5
Cliff Thorburn (CAN)	10
Jason Ferguson (ENG)	9
Mark Davis (ENG)	10
Peter Ebdon (ENG)	10
Stefan Mazrocis (ENG)	4
Dean Reynolds (ENG)	8
Brian Morgan (ENG)	10
Doug Mountjoy (WAL)	9
Les Dodd (ENG)	10
Dene O'Kane (NZL)	10
Stephen Lee (ENG)	6
Joe Swail (NIR)	4
Billy Snaddon (SCO)	10
Joe Johnson (ENG)	9
Anthony Davies (WAL)	10
Tony Knowles (ENG)	9
Alex Higgins (NIR)	10
Mick Price (ENG)	4
Fergal O'Brien (IRE)	10
Mark Johnston-Allen (ENG)	9
Gary Ponting (ENG)	10
Gary Wilkinson (ENG)	9
Mark King (ENG)	10
Tony Jones (ENG)	8
Ronnie O'Sullivan (ENG)	10
Mike Hallett (ENG)	5
Drew Henry (SCO)	10

== Century breaks ==
=== Main stage centuries ===
A total of 35 century breaks were made during the main stage of the tournament, tying the record with the 1993 tournament. The highest break of the tournament was a 143 made by Alan McManus in the first round.

- 143, 105, 102 – Alan McManus
- 139, 102 – Martin Clark
- 139 – Cliff Thorburn
- 137 – Billy Snaddon
- 134, 108 – Brian Morgan
- 134, 101 – Steve Davis
- 133, 112 – Drew Henry
- 132 – John Parrott
- 124, 120, 120, 109, 100 – Stephen Hendry
- 124 – Peter Ebdon
- 119, 100 – Ken Doherty
- 118, 100 – Fergal O'Brien
- 118 – Willie Thorne
- 116, 112, 108, 107, 103 – Jimmy White
- 115, 107, 100 – Darren Morgan
- 114 – Dene O'Kane
- 100 – James Wattana

=== Qualifying stage centuries ===
A total of 67 century breaks were made during the qualifying rounds. The highest was a 143 made by Karl Payne.

- 143 – Karl Payne
- 141, 103 – Jamie Burnett
- 138, 129 – John Higgins
- 135 – Jon Birch
- 135 – Dominic Dale
- 133, 118, 101 – Mark Davis
- 133 – Paul Canvey
- 133 – Tom Finstad
- 132 – Mark O'Sullivan
- 132 – Eddie Manning
- 129, 127, 105 – Leigh Robertson
- 125 – Peter Gilchrist
- 125 – Colin Kelly
- 125 – Roger Garrett
- 123 – Karl Broughton
- 121, 113 – Cliff Thorburn
- 121, 100 – Michael Judge
- 118 – Alastair Fleming
- 117, 102 – Dean Reynolds
- 117 – Joe Canny
- 116, 102 – Stephen Lee
- 116 – Mark Flowerdew
- 115 – Gary Peters
- 114, 109, 109 – Drew Henry
- 114 – Gary Natale
- 114 – Leigh Griffin
- 111 – Chris Small
- 110 – Neil Mosley
- 109 – Andy Hicks
- 109 – Sefton Payne
- 108 – Adrian Rosa
- 108 – Gary Ponting
- 108 – John Lardner
- 107 – Anthony Hamilton
- 107 – Joe Johnson
- 106, 100 – Mark King
- 106 – Norman Maher
- 106 – Matt Wilson
- 106 – John Timson
- 106 – Nick Walker
- 106 – Surinder Gill
- 106 – Robert Chapman
- 105 – Lee Walters
- 105 – Bradley Jones
- 104 – Neil Wood
- 104 – Darren Lennox
- 104 – Stefan Mazrocis
- 104 – Gerard Greene
- 103 – Martin O'Neill
- 103 – Alex Higgins
- 103 – Noppadon Noppachorn
- 102 – Stuart Pettman
- 101 – Tim Dunphy
- 101 – Philip Williams
