= 1995 International Open =

1995 Sweater Shop International Open
Tournament information
- Dates: 13–19 February 1995
- Venue: Bournemouth International Centre
- City: Bournemouth
- Country: England
- Organisation: WPBSA
- Format: Ranking event
- Winner's share: £60,000

Final
- Champion: John Higgins (SCO)
- Runner-up: Steve Davis (ENG)
- Score: 9–5

The 1995 International Open (officially the 1995 Sweater Shop International Open) was a professional ranking snooker tournament that took place between 13 and 19 February 1995 at the Bournemouth International Centre in Bournemouth, England.

John Higgins won the title by defeating Steve Davis 9–5 in the final. The defending champion John Parrott was defeated by Higgins in the semi-finals.

== Main draw ==
Last 64; Best of 9 frames
(Scotland) John Higgins | 5
(Northern Ireland) Joe Swail | 1
(Scotland) Drew Henry | 5
(England) Dean Reynolds | 2
(Republic of Ireland) Ken Doherty | 5
(England) Rod Lawler | 2
(England) Peter Lines | 5
(Wales) Doug Mountjoy | 4
(Scotland) Euan Henderson | 5
(Thailand) James Wattana | 4
(Northern Ireland) Dennis Taylor | 5
(Northern Ireland) Terry Murphy | 3
(Wales) Terry Griffiths | 5
(Thailand) Tai Pichit | 0
(Canada) Jim Wych | 5
(England) Steve James | 3
(England) John Parrott | 5
(England) Neil Mosley | 0
(Scotland) Billy Snaddon | 5
(New Zealand) Dene O'Kane | 3
(Canada) Alain Robidoux | 5
(Wales) Tony Chappel | 2
(Malta) Tony Drago | 5
(Northern Ireland) Jason Prince | 4
(Scotland) Alan McManus | 5
(Wales) Wayne Jones | 3
(England) Mark Davis | 5
(England) Brian Morgan | 1
(England) Mike Hallett | 5
(England) Jeff Cundy | 2
(England) David Roe | 5
(Republic of Ireland) Stephen Murphy | 1
(England) Steve Davis | 5
(England) Mark Flowerdew | 2
(England) Dave Harold | w/o
(England) Roger Garrett | w/d
(England) Peter Ebdon | 5
(Wales) Paul Davies | 3
(England) Jason Ferguson | 5
(South Africa) Silvino Francisco | 4
(England) Mick Price | 5
(England) Anthony Hamilton | 1
(England) Anton Bishop | 5
(England) Willie Thorne | 4
(Wales) Darren Morgan | 5
(Canada) Cliff Thorburn | 3
(England) Neal Foulds | 5
(Scotland) Paul McPhillips | 2
(England) Jimmy White | 5
(England) Nick Terry | 3
(England) Andy Hicks | 5
(Wales) Mark Bennett | 2
(England) Nigel Bond | 5
(Scotland) David McLellan | 1
(England) Tony Jones | 5
(England) Martin Clark | 4
(England) Mark Johnston-Allen | 5
(Scotland) Stephen Hendry | 4
(Wales) Mark Williams | 5
(England) Gary Wilkinson | 2
(England) Ronnie O'Sullivan | 5
(Scotland) Graeme Dott | 3
(England) Tony Knowles | 5
(England) Dave Finbow | 1

Last 32; Best of 9 frames
(Scotland) John Higgins | 5
(Scotland) Drew Henry | 3
(Republic of Ireland) Ken Doherty | 5
(England) Peter Lines | 1
(Scotland) Euan Henderson | 5
(Northern Ireland) Dennis Taylor | 2
(Wales) Terry Griffiths | 5
(Canada) Jim Wych | 0
(England) John Parrott | 5
(Scotland) Billy Snaddon | 2
(Canada) Alain Robidoux | 5
(Malta) Tony Drago | 2
(Scotland) Alan McManus | 5
(England) Mark Davis | 1
(England) Mike Hallett | 5
(England) David Roe | 4
(England) Steve Davis | 5
(England) Dave Harold | 3
(England) Peter Ebdon | 5
(England) Jason Ferguson | 1
(England) Mick Price | 5
(England) Anton Bishop | 1
(Wales) Darren Morgan | 5
(England) Neal Foulds | 1
(England) Jimmy White | 5
(England) Andy Hicks | 3
(England) Nigel Bond | 5
(England) Tony Jones | 2
(England) Mark Johnston-Allen | 5
(Wales) Mark Williams | 1
(England) Ronnie O'Sullivan | 5
(England) Tony Knowles | 2

Last 16; Best of 9 frames
(Scotland) John Higgins | 5
(Republic of Ireland) Ken Doherty | 0
(Scotland) Euan Henderson | 5
(Wales) Terry Griffiths | 2
(England) John Parrott | 5
(Canada) Alain Robidoux | 2
(Scotland) Alan McManus | 5
(England) Mike Hallett | 1
(England) Steve Davis | 5
(England) Peter Ebdon | 2
(England) Mick Price | 5
(Wales) Darren Morgan | 2
(England) Jimmy White | 5
(England) Nigel Bond | 2
(England) Mark Johnston-Allen | 5
(England) Ronnie O'Sullivan | 2

Quarter-finals; Best of 9 frames
(Scotland) John Higgins | 5
(Scotland) Euan Henderson | 2
(England) John Parrott | 5
(Scotland) Alan McManus | 1
(England) Steve Davis | 5
(England) Mick Price | 0
(England) Jimmy White | 5
(England) Mark Johnston-Allen | 0

Semi-finals; Best of 11 frames
(Scotland) John Higgins | 6
(England) John Parrott | 4
(England) Steve Davis | 6
(England) Jimmy White | 4

Final; Best of 17 frames
(Scotland) John Higgins | 9
(England) Steve Davis | 5
