= Adrian Rosa =

English snooker player

Personal information
- Born: 17 January 1971 (age 55)

Sport
- Country: England
- Sport: Snooker
- Professional: 1991–1997, 1998/1999, 2000–2002, 2003/2004
- Highest ranking: 88 (2003/2004)
- Best ranking finish: Last 32 (x1)

Adrian Rosa (born 17 January 1971) is an English former professional snooker player.

== Career ==
Born in 1971, Rosa turned professional in 1991. He first progressed beyond the pre-qualifying rounds of any event at the 1991 Grand Prix, where he won six matches - including a 5–0 whitewash over the fading Alex Higgins - before losing 2–5 to Ken Doherty in the last 96.

At the 1994 World Championship, he beat four opponents, including Eugene Hughes, to reach the last-64 stage, but lost 6–10 to Gary Ponting.

In the 1994 UK Championship, Rosa met Stephen Hendry in the last 64, recovering from 1–7 down to 5–8 but losing 5–9; the £2,200 he earned from this performance was his highest earning during the 1994/1995 season.

The 1996/1997 season heralded some success for Rosa, as he reached the main stages of a ranking event for the first and only time in his career, at the 1997 International Open. There, he defeated Steve Prest, Steve Russell, Dean Reynolds and Jason Ferguson, but lost 1–5 to Stuart Parnell in the last 32.

During the following season, having dropped off the main tour in 1997, Rosa reached the semi-final of one tour qualifying event, losing 3–5 to Antony Bolsover, and the sixth qualifying round at the 1998 World Championship, where he beat Rory McLeod 10–8, Darryn Walker 10–9, Stuart Bingham 10–7 and Marco Fu 10–8 to face David Gray. Having defeated three future top-32 players, Rosa lost 5–10 to Gray, but his season's performances were enough for him to rejoin the tour.

Having again fallen out of the professional ranks by 2000, Rosa won the first event of that year's Challenge Tour, beating Surinder Gill 6–4 in the final. The next season was poor, however, with only three victories; two of these came in the 2001 Benson & Hedges Championship, over Mark Ganderton and Joe Jogia, before he lost 2–5 to Shaun Murphy at the last-32 stage. During their match, Murphy compiled his first 147 maximum break in professional competition.

Competing once more as an amateur in 2003, Rosa won another Challenge Tour event that year; in event 2, he defeated Stuart Mann 6–5 in the final, in the process making a break of 102. This earned him back his place on tour for the 2003/2004 season, but no success followed. His best showing was a last-64 finish at the 2003 British Open, where Michael Holt beat him 5–4. Although he finished the season ranked 88th, a career best, Rosa was relegated from the tour for the fourth and final time in 2004, aged 33.

== Career finals ==
=== Non-ranking finals: 2 (2 titles) ===
Outcome	Year	Championship	Opponent in the final	Score
Winner	2000	Challenge Tour - Event 1	(England) Surinder Gill	6–4
Winner	2003	Challenge Tour - Event 2	(England) Stuart Mann	6–5
