= 1993 Grand Prix (snooker) =

Skoda Grand Prix
Tournament information
- Dates: 18–31 October 1993
- Venue: The Hexagon
- City: Reading
- Country: England
- Organisation: WPBSA
- Format: Ranking event
- Total prize fund: £325,000
- Winner's share: £60,000
- Highest break: 145

Final
- Champion: Peter Ebdon (ENG)
- Runner-up: Ken Doherty (IRL)
- Score: 9–6

The 1993 Skoda Grand Prix was a professional ranking snooker tournament that took place at The Hexagon in Reading, Berkshire, England from 18 to 31 October 1993. It was the first time that Skoda sponsored the event. It would also be the last time The Hexagon would host the tournament which has hosted the event since the first Grand Prix in 1984.

Jimmy White was the defending champion, but he lost his last 16 match against Ken Doherty. Peter Ebdon won in the final 9–6 against Doherty to win his first major title.

== Tournament summary ==
Defending champion Jimmy White was the number 1 seed with World Champion Stephen Hendry seeded 2. The remaining places were allocated to players based on the world rankings.

== Prize fund and ranking points ==
The breakdown of prize money and ranking points of the event are shown below:

		Prize money	Ranking points
Winner		£60,000	3600
Runner-up		£32,000	3200
Semi-final		£16,000	2800
Quarter-final		£9,050	2400
Last 16		£4,550	2000
Last 32		£2,600	1600
Last 64	Unseeded	£1,595	1200
Last 64	Seeded	£1,595	600

Highest break	Prize money	Break
Non-televised	£1,200	145 John Higgins (SCO)
Televised	£2,400	136 Gary Wilkinson (ENG)

== Main draw ==
Last 64; Best of 9 frames
1	Jimmy White (ENG)	5
51	Tony Meo (ENG)	2
32	Jason Ferguson (ENG)	5
Robin Hull (FIN)	4
24	Mark Bennett (WAL)	3
Stuart Pettman (ENG)	5
11	Ken Doherty (IRL)	5
Jamie Woodman (ENG)	2
10	Darren Morgan (WAL)	5
62	Eugene Hughes (IRL)	0
22	Dene O'Kane (NZL)	5
Terry Murphy (NIR)	0
23	Tony Knowles (ENG)	5
61	Alex Higgins (NIR)	1
7	Willie Thorne (ENG)	3
37	Brian Morgan (ENG)	5
8	Terry Griffiths (WAL)	2
Gerard Greene (NIR)	5
20	Tony Drago (MLT)	4
Stephen Lee (ENG)	5
18	Alain Robidoux (CAN)	5
Roger Garrett (ENG)	1
14	Neal Foulds (ENG)	5
Ken Owers (ENG)	3
15	Dennis Taylor (NIR)	1
Marcus Campbell (SCO)	5
29	Tony Jones (ENG)	4
50	Dave Harold (ENG)	5
28	Dean Reynolds (ENG)	1
Anthony Davies (WAL)	5
4	Steve Davis (ENG)	5
Brian Rowswell (ENG)	1
3	John Parrott (ENG)	5
57	Ronnie O'Sullivan (ENG)	1
30	Doug Mountjoy (WAL)	3
Steve Duggan (ENG)	5
26	Joe Johnson (ENG)	3
John Higgins (SCO)	5
9	Nigel Bond (ENG)	5
Barry Pinches (ENG)	0
12	Martin Clark (ENG)	5
Karl Payne (ENG)	2
19	Mike Hallett (ENG)	5
Surinder Gill (ENG)	3
31	Mark Johnston-Allen (ENG)	0
Mark Williams (WAL)	5
6	Alan McManus (SCO)	5
Robby Foldvari (AUS)	3
5	James Wattana (THA)	5
64	Drew Henry (SCO)	2
17	Gary Wilkinson (ENG)	5
38	Peter Francisco (RSA)	4
27	Mick Price (ENG)	5
Stuart Parnell (ENG)	4
13	Steve James (ENG)	5
42	Jason Prince (NIR)	4
16	David Roe (ENG)	5
Sean Lanigan (ENG)	3
25	Joe Swail (NIR)	3
Mark Flowerdew (ENG)	5
21	Peter Ebdon (ENG)	5
Chris Scanlon (ENG)	2
2	Stephen Hendry (SCO)	5
Darryn Walker (ENG)	4

Last 32; Best of 9 frames
1	Jimmy White (ENG)	5
32	Jason Ferguson (ENG)	2
Stuart Pettman (ENG)	1
11	Ken Doherty (IRL)	5
10	Darren Morgan (WAL)	3
22	Dene O'Kane (NZL)	5
23	Tony Knowles (ENG)	5
37	Brian Morgan (ENG)	2
Gerard Greene (NIR)	3
Stephen Lee (ENG)	5
18	Alain Robidoux (CAN)	1
14	Neal Foulds (ENG)	5
Marcus Campbell (SCO)	2
50	Dave Harold (ENG)	5
Anthony Davies (WAL)	1
4	Steve Davis (ENG)	5
3	John Parrott (ENG)	5
Steve Duggan (ENG)	4
John Higgins (SCO)	5
9	Nigel Bond (ENG)	3
12	Martin Clark (ENG)	5
19	Mike Hallett (ENG)	4
Mark Williams (WAL)	2
6	Alan McManus (SCO)	5
5	James Wattana (THA)	4
17	Gary Wilkinson (ENG)	5
27	Mick Price (ENG)	0
13	Steve James (ENG)	5
16	David Roe (ENG)	3
Mark Flowerdew (ENG)	5
21	Peter Ebdon (ENG)	5
2	Stephen Hendry (SCO)	4

Last 16; Best of 9 frames
1	Jimmy White (ENG)	3
11	Ken Doherty (IRL)	5
22	Dene O'Kane (NZL)	1
23	Tony Knowles (ENG)	5
Stephen Lee (ENG)	5
14	Neal Foulds (ENG)	2
50	Dave Harold (ENG)	0
4	Steve Davis (ENG)	5
3	John Parrott (ENG)	5
John Higgins (SCO)	2
12	Martin Clark (ENG)	5
6	Alan McManus (SCO)	1
17	Gary Wilkinson (ENG)	5
13	Steve James (ENG)	3
Mark Flowerdew (ENG)	3
21	Peter Ebdon (ENG)	5

Quarter-finals; Best of 9 frames
11	Ken Doherty (IRL)	5
23	Tony Knowles (ENG)	4
Stephen Lee (ENG)	0
4	Steve Davis (ENG)	5
3	John Parrott (ENG)	5
12	Martin Clark (ENG)	4
17	Gary Wilkinson (ENG)	4
21	Peter Ebdon (ENG)	5

Semi-finals; Best of 17 frames
11	Ken Doherty (IRL)	9
4	Steve Davis (ENG)	4
3	John Parrott (ENG)	5
21	Peter Ebdon (ENG)	9

Final; Best of 17 frames
11	Ken Doherty (IRL)	6
21	Peter Ebdon (ENG)	9

== Final ==
Final: Best of 17 frames. Referee: Len Ganley. Hexagon Theatre, Reading, England, 31 October 1993.
Ken Doherty (11); Ireland	6–9	Peter Ebdon (21); England
Afternoon: 66–36 (61), 79–16 (64), 51–55, 46–82 (82), 78–32 (50), 120–0 (58, 54), 26–77 (51), 40–77 (52); Evening: 16–73, 96–17 (65), 31–65, 70–46, 8–74, 0–96 (59), 27–66
65	Highest break	82
0	Century breaks	0
6	50+ breaks	4
