= Roger Garrett =

Roger Garrett may refer to:

- Roger Garrett (snooker player)
- Roger Garrett (actor)
