= 1998 UK Championship =

1998 Liverpool Victoria UK Championship
Tournament information
- Dates: 16–29 November 1998
- Venue: Bournemouth International Centre
- City: Bournemouth
- Country: England
- Organisation: WPBSA
- Format: Ranking event
- Total prize fund: £460,000
- Winner's share: £75,000
- Highest break: John Higgins (SCO) (141)

Final
- Champion: John Higgins (SCO)
- Runner-up: Matthew Stevens (WAL)
- Score: 10–6

The 1998 UK Championship (officially the 1998 Liverpool Victoria UK Championship) was a professional ranking snooker tournament that took place at the Bournemouth International Centre in Bournemouth, England. The event started on 16 November 1998 and the televised stages were shown on BBC between 21 and 29 November 1998.

This was the first UK championship to be held in Bournemouth since the inaugural championship in 1977, after 20 years at Preston. The Conference Centre has held snooker competitions before. It hosted the World Cup between 1985 and 1990, the Mercantile Credit Classic in 1991 and 1992, the International Open in 1994 and 1995, and the Grand Prix in 1996 and 1997.

Five-time champion Stephen Hendry lost 9–0 in the first round to fellow Scottish player Marcus Campbell.

Ronnie O'Sullivan was the defending champion, but he withdrew before the tournament. His doctor had told him to rest after suffering from physical and nervous exhaustion.

John Higgins won this year's title by defeating Matthew Stevens 10–6 in the final to go with the World Championship crown he won earlier in the year. This was Higgins' 10th ranking title.

== Tournament summary ==
Defending champion Ronnie O'Sullivan was the number 1 seed with World Champion John Higgins seeded 2. The remaining places were allocated to players based on the world rankings.

== Prize fund ==
The breakdown of prize money for this year is shown below:

- Winner: £75,000
- Runner-up: £39,000
- Semi-final: £19,750
- Quarter-final: £10,080
- Last 16: £5,525
- Last 32: £3,450
- Last 64: £2,950
- Last 96: £1,460
- Last 134: £235
- Stage one highest break: £1,500
- Stage two highest break: £5,000
- Total: £460,000

== Main draw ==
=== Top half ===
Round 1 (Last 64); Best of 17 frames
1	(England) Ronnie O'Sullivan	w/d
70	(England) John Read	w/o
31	(Scotland) Jamie Burnett	4
40	(England) Rod Lawler	9
26	(Wales) Matthew Stevens	9
44	(England) Bradley Jones	7
9	(England) Stephen Lee	9
79	(England) Steve Judd	4
15	(Thailand) James Wattana	3
78	(England) Matthew Couch	9
17	(England) Gary Wilkinson	4
377	(Hong Kong) Marco Fu	9
30	(Scotland) Graeme Dott	9
59	(Northern Ireland) Gerard Greene	3
8	(Scotland) Alan McManus	7
193	(England) Michael Holt	9
5	(Wales) Mark Williams	9
81	(England) Jimmy Michie	3
23	(Wales) Dominic Dale	9
61	(England) David Gray	4
19	(England) Dave Harold	9
57	(New Zealand) Dene O'Kane	6
13	(England) Nigel Bond	9
53	(England) Peter Lines	6
11	(England) Anthony Hamilton	9
47	(Wales) Tony Chappel	4
20	(Republic of Ireland) Fergal O'Brien	9
62	(England) Paul Wykes	2
28	(England) Martin Clark	9
74	(England) Joe Perry	8
4	(Republic of Ireland) Ken Doherty	9
94	(Scotland) John Lardner	0

Round 2 (Last 32); Best of 17 frames
70	(England) John Read	5
40	(England) Rod Lawler	9
26	(Wales) Matthew Stevens	9
9	(England) Stephen Lee	6
78	(England) Matthew Couch	9
377	(Hong Kong) Marco Fu	6
30	(Scotland) Graeme Dott	1
193	(England) Michael Holt	9
5	(Wales) Mark Williams	9
23	(Wales) Dominic Dale	4
19	(England) Dave Harold	9
13	(England) Nigel Bond	5
11	(England) Anthony Hamilton	8
20	(Republic of Ireland) Fergal O'Brien	9
28	(England) Martin Clark	7
4	(Republic of Ireland) Ken Doherty	9

Round 3 (Last 16); Best of 17 frames
40	(England) Rod Lawler	5
26	(Wales) Matthew Stevens	9
78	(England) Matthew Couch	9
193	(England) Michael Holt	5
5	(Wales) Mark Williams	4
19	(England) Dave Harold	9
20	(Republic of Ireland) Fergal O'Brien	9
4	(Republic of Ireland) Ken Doherty	7

Quarter-finals; Best of 17 frames
26	(Wales) Matthew Stevens	9
78	(England) Matthew Couch	5
19	(England) Dave Harold	9
20	(Republic of Ireland) Fergal O'Brien	4

Semi-final; Best of 17 frames
26	(Wales) Matthew Stevens	9
19	(England) Dave Harold	7

=== Bottom half ===
Round 1 (Last 64); Best of 17 frames
3	(Scotland) Stephen Hendry	0
73	(Scotland) Marcus Campbell	9
32	(Scotland) Billy Snaddon	3
45	(Australia) Quinten Hann	9
21	(England) Andy Hicks	9
213	(England) John Whitty	6
14	(England) Steve Davis	9
97	(Scotland) Graham Horne	4
16	(England) Mark King	8
36	(Northern Ireland) Joe Swail	9
24	(England) Paul Hunter	9
50	(Wales) Lee Walker	3
18	(England) Jimmy White	9
42	(England) Jonathan Birch	7
7	(England) Peter Ebdon	4
41	(Wales) Paul Davies	9
6	(England) John Parrott	9
38	(Scotland) Euan Henderson	8
22	(Wales) Darren Morgan	7
37	(England) Steve James	9
25	(Scotland) Chris Small	7
150	(Northern Ireland) Patrick Wallace	9
10	(Malta) Tony Drago	8
75	(England) Gary Ponting	9
12	(Canada) Alain Robidoux	8
89	(England) Lee Richardson	9
29	(Northern Ireland) Terry Murphy	9
34	(England) Neal Foulds	3
27	(England) Brian Morgan	9
63	(England) Tony Jones	4
2	(Scotland) John Higgins	9
48	(England) David Roe	1

Round 2 (Last 32); Best of 17 frames
73	(Scotland) Marcus Campbell	9
45	(Australia) Quinten Hann	5
21	(England) Andy Hicks	2
14	(England) Steve Davis	9
36	(Northern Ireland) Joe Swail	6
24	(England) Paul Hunter	9
18	(England) Jimmy White	9
41	(Wales) Paul Davies	4
6	(England) John Parrott	9
37	(England) Steve James	3
150	(Northern Ireland) Patrick Wallace	8
75	(England) Gary Ponting	9
89	(England) Lee Richardson	3
29	(Northern Ireland) Terry Murphy	9
27	(England) Brian Morgan	4
2	(Scotland) John Higgins	9

Round 3 (Last 16); Best of 17 frames
73	(Scotland) Marcus Campbell	7
14	(England) Steve Davis	9
24	(England) Paul Hunter	9
18	(England) Jimmy White	2
6	(England) John Parrott	9
75	(England) Gary Ponting	6
29	(Northern Ireland) Terry Murphy	3
2	(Scotland) John Higgins	9

Quarter-finals; Best of 17 frames
14	(England) Steve Davis	4
24	(England) Paul Hunter	9
6	(England) John Parrott	6
2	(Scotland) John Higgins	9

Semi-final; Best of 17 frames
24	(England) Paul Hunter	4
2	(Scotland) John Higgins	9

== Final ==
Final: Best of 19 frames. Referee: Alan Chamberlain. Bournemouth International Centre, Bournemouth, England, 29 November 1998.
Matthew Stevens (26); Wales	6–10	John Higgins (2); Scotland
Afternoon: 0–86, 36–62, 68–31 (52), 48–69, 91–0 (62), 11–68 (50), 105–10 (105), 61–60 (Higgins 60); Evening: 72–22 (66), 36–87 (73), 0–84 (84), 6–70, 0–107 (107), 76–34, 23–81, 0–90 (90)
105	Highest break	107
1	Century breaks	1
4	50+ breaks	6

== Century breaks ==
=== Televised stage centuries ===
- 141, 116, 107, 106, 101 – John Higgins
- 138, 128, 127, 109 – Gary Ponting
- 138 – Dominic Dale
- 136, 114 – Gerard Greene
- 135, 117, 105 – Matthew Stevens
- 130, 127 – Fergal O'Brien
- 126 – Jimmy White
- 118, 111, 104 – Andy Hicks
- 118 – Michael Holt
- 116 – Mark Williams
- 115, 105, 100 – Dave Harold
- 115 – Chris Small
- 114 – Patrick Wallace
- 113 – Anthony Hamilton
- 111 – Martin Clark
- 107, 105 – Euan Henderson
- 102 – Lee Richardson
- 102 – Peter Ebdon

=== Qualifying stage centuries ===
- 138 – Joe Grech
- 128 – Barry Pinches
- 125 – Gary Ponting
- 124 – Peter McCullagh
- 120 – Michael Holt
- 119 – Gerard Greene
- 119 – Keith E Boon
- 116 – Mehmet Husnu
- 114 – John Read
- 110 – Kristjan Helgason
- 110 – Leo Fernandez
- 109 – Phil Williams
- 107 – Alfie Burden
- 105 – Ali Carter
- 105 – John Giles
- 104, 101 – Lee Richardson
- 100 – Adrian Gunnell
- 100 – Euan Henderson
- 100 – David Roe
