= 1993 International Open =

1993 Sky Sports International Open
Tournament information
- Dates: 2–11 April 1993
- Venue: Plymouth Pavilions
- City: Plymouth
- Country: England
- Organisation: WPBSA
- Format: Ranking event
- Winner's share: £25,000

Final
- Champion: Stephen Hendry (SCO)
- Runner-up: Steve Davis (ENG)
- Score: 10–6

The 1993 International Open (officially the 1993 Sky Sports International Open) was a professional ranking snooker tournament that took place between 2–11 April 1993 at the Plymouth Pavilions in Plymouth, England with TV coverage on Sky Sports beginning on 5 April. It was the first International Open held since 1989 and is now moved to April for this season only as the last ranking tournament before the World Championship.

Stephen Hendry won the title by defeating the defending champion Steve Davis 10–6 in the final.

== Main draw ==
Last 64; Best of 9 frames
(England) Steve Davis	5
(England) Tony Meo	4
(New Zealand) Dene O'Kane	5
(Wales) Mark Williams	4
(England) Willie Thorne	5
(England) John Virgo	3
(South Africa) Silvino Francisco	5
(England) Graham MacDonald	2
(England) Nigel Bond	5
(England) Jonathan Birch	3
(England) David Roe	5
(Northern Ireland) Joe O'Boye	0
(Wales) Terry Griffiths	5
(Scotland) Jamie Burnett	0
(England) Tony Knowles	5
(England) Stefan Mazrocis	2
(Thailand) James Wattana	5
(Australia) John Campbell	0
(Republic of Ireland) Ken Doherty	5
(England) Cary Kikis	3
(Canada) Bob Chaperon	5
(Canada) Alain Robidoux	4
(England) Darryn Walker	5
(England) Danny Fowler	3
(England) Steve James	5
(England) Shaun Mellish	3
(England) Anthony Hamilton	5
(Wales) Mark Bennett	2
(Republic of Ireland) Fergal O'Brien	w/o
(England) Jimmy White	w/d
(England) Tony Jones	5
(England) Gary Lees	1
(England) John Parrott	5
(England) Brian Morgan	3
(England) Jason Ferguson	5
(England) Mark Johnston-Allen	2
(Wales) Paul Davies	5
(Northern Ireland) Dennis Taylor	2
(Australia) Eddie Charlton	5
(England) Steve Prest	1
(England) Paul Tanner	5
(England) Martin Clark	2
(Scotland) Billy Snaddon	5
(England) Joe Johnson	0
(England) Andy Hicks	5
(England) Neal Foulds	2
(England) Dave Harold	5
(Wales) Doug Mountjoy	3
(Scotland) Drew Henry	5
(England) Gary Wilkinson	2
(England) Ronnie O'Sullivan	5
(England) Dean Reynolds	2
(Scotland) Alan McManus	5
(England) Troy Shaw	1
(England) Mike Hallett	5
(England) Les Dodd	4
(England) Mick Price	5
(Wales) Darren Morgan	3
(England) Peter Ebdon	5
(Malta) Tony Drago	0
(Republic of Ireland) Stephen O'Connor	5
(South Africa) Peter Francisco	1
(Scotland) Stephen Hendry	5
(Wales) Cliff Wilson	0

Last 32; Best of 9 frames
(England) Steve Davis	5
(New Zealand) Dene O'Kane	0
(England) Willie Thorne	3
(South Africa) Silvino Francisco	5
(England) Nigel Bond	5
(England) David Roe	0
(Wales) Terry Griffiths	5
(England) Tony Knowles	2
(Thailand) James Wattana	2
(Republic of Ireland) Ken Doherty	5
(Canada) Bob Chaperon	4
(England) Darryn Walker	5
(England) Steve James	5
(England) Anthony Hamilton	3
(Republic of Ireland) Fergal O'Brien	2
(England) Tony Jones	5
(England) John Parrott	4
(England) Jason Ferguson	5
(Wales) Paul Davies	5
(Australia) Eddie Charlton	3
(England) Paul Tanner	2
(Scotland) Billy Snaddon	5
(England) Andy Hicks	4
(England) Dave Harold	5
(Scotland) Drew Henry	5
(England) Ronnie O'Sullivan	4
(Scotland) Alan McManus	5
(England) Mike Hallett	1
(England) Mick Price	4
(England) Peter Ebdon	5
(Republic of Ireland) Stephen O'Connor	0
(Scotland) Stephen Hendry	5

Last 16; Best of 9 frames
(England) Steve Davis	5
(South Africa) Silvino Francisco	3
(England) Nigel Bond	5
(Wales) Terry Griffiths	3
(Republic of Ireland) Ken Doherty	5
(England) Darryn Walker	1
(England) Steve James	3
(England) Tony Jones	5
(England) Jason Ferguson	1
(Wales) Paul Davies	5
(Scotland) Billy Snaddon	2
(England) Dave Harold	5
(Scotland) Drew Henry	2
(Scotland) Alan McManus	5
(England) Peter Ebdon	4
(Scotland) Stephen Hendry	5

Quarter-finals; Best of 9 frames
(England) Steve Davis	5
(England) Nigel Bond	3
(Republic of Ireland) Ken Doherty	5
(England) Tony Jones	2
(Wales) Paul Davies	4
(England) Dave Harold	5
(Scotland) Alan McManus	2
(Scotland) Stephen Hendry	5

Semi-finals; Best of 11 frames
(England) Steve Davis	6
(Republic of Ireland) Ken Doherty	4
(England) Dave Harold	0
(Scotland) Stephen Hendry	6

Final; Best of 19 frames
(England) Steve Davis	6
(Scotland) Stephen Hendry	10
