= 1997 UK Championship =

1997 Liverpool Victoria UK Championship
Tournament information
- Dates: 12–30 November 1997
- Venue: Preston Guild Hall
- City: Preston
- Country: England
- Organisation: WPBSA
- Format: Ranking event
- Total prize fund: £440,000
- Winner's share: £75,000
- Highest break: Matthew Stevens (WAL) (143)

Final
- Champion: Ronnie O'Sullivan (ENG)
- Runner-up: Stephen Hendry (SCO)
- Score: 10–6

The 1997 UK Championship (officially the 1997 Liverpool Victoria UK Championship) was a professional ranking snooker tournament that took place at the Guild Hall in Preston, England. The event started on 12 November 1997 and the televised stages were shown on BBC between 22 and 30 November 1997. This was the last UK championship to be held in Preston, where the event was held since 1978. The following year's competition was held in Bournemouth.

Ronnie O'Sullivan defeated Stephen Hendry 10–6 in the final, ending Hendry's run of three successive UK championship wins. O'Sullivan had been the last player other than Hendry to win the event, as a 17-year-old in 1993. The highest TV break of the competition was 137 made by Stephen Lee and it was worth £5,000.

== Prize fund ==
The breakdown of prize money for this year is shown below:

- Winner: £75,000
- Runner-up: £39,000
- Semi-final: £19,750
- Quarter-final: £10,800
- Last 16: £5,500
- Last 32: £3,450
- Last 64: £2,900
- Last 96: £1,400
- Stage one highest break: £1,500
- Stage two highest break: £5,000
- Total: £440,000

== Main draw ==
=== Top half ===
Round 1 (Last 64); Best of 17 frames
1 | (Scotland) Stephen Hendry | 9
86 | (England) John Read | 2
27 | (England) Martin Clark | 5
82 | (England) Sean Storey | 9
31 | (England) Mick Price | 6
38 | (Scotland) Jamie Burnett | 9
14 | (England) Anthony Hamilton | 9
131 | (England) Troy Shaw | 2
10 | (Scotland) Alan McManus | 9
60 | (England) Tony Jones | 6
21 | (England) Jimmy White | 9
48 | (Wales) Paul Davies | 2
18 | (England) Dave Harold | 6
42 | (Northern Ireland) Jason Prince | 9
5 | (England) Peter Ebdon | 9
152 | (England) David Gray | 6
8 | (England) Nigel Bond | 6
104 | (Australia) Quinten Hann | 9
22 | (Northern Ireland) Joe Swail | 5
116 | (Scotland) Martin Dziewialtowski | 9
28 | (England) Brian Morgan | 7
51 | (England) Dean Reynolds | 9
9 | (Canada) Alain Robidoux | 3
59 | (Pakistan) Shokat Ali | 9
11 | (Malta) Tony Drago | 9
76 | (England) Ian McCulloch | 7
26 | (England) Rod Lawler | 7
53 | (Wales) Matthew Stevens | 9
24 | (England) Steve James | 5
34 | (Northern Ireland) Dennis Taylor | 9
4 | (Wales) Mark Williams | 9
45 | (England) Jonathan Birch | 6

Round 2 (Last 32); Best of 17 frames
1 | (Scotland) Stephen Hendry | 9
82 | (England) Sean Storey | 7
38 | (Scotland) Jamie Burnett | 3
14 | (England) Anthony Hamilton | 9
10 | (Scotland) Alan McManus | 9
21 | (England) Jimmy White | 7
42 | (Northern Ireland) Jason Prince | 9
5 | (England) Peter Ebdon | 5
104 | (Australia) Quinten Hann | 6
116 | (Scotland) Martin Dziewialtowski | 9
51 | (England) Dean Reynolds | 9
59 | (Pakistan) Shokat Ali | 6
11 | (Malta) Tony Drago | 8
53 | (Wales) Matthew Stevens | 9
34 | (Northern Ireland) Dennis Taylor | 3
4 | (Wales) Mark Williams | 9

Round 3 (Last 16); Best of 17 frames
1 | (Scotland) Stephen Hendry | 9
14 | (England) Anthony Hamilton | 8
10 | (Scotland) Alan McManus | 9
42 | (Northern Ireland) Jason Prince | 5
116 | (Scotland) Martin Dziewialtowski | 9
51 | (England) Dean Reynolds | 7
53 | (Wales) Matthew Stevens | 9
4 | (Wales) Mark Williams | 1

Quarter-finals; Best of 17 frames
1 | (Scotland) Stephen Hendry | 9
10 | (Scotland) Alan McManus | 5
116 | (Scotland) Martin Dziewialtowski | 1
53 | (Wales) Matthew Stevens | 9

Semi-final; Best of 17 frames
1 | (Scotland) Stephen Hendry | 9
53 | (Wales) Matthew Stevens | 5

=== Bottom half ===
Round 1 (Last 64); Best of 17 frames
3 | (Republic of Ireland) Ken Doherty | 9
41 | (England) Karl Broughton | 3
30 | (England) Neal Foulds | 9
78 | (England) Karl Burrows | 6
25 | (Scotland) Chris Small | 9
43 | (England) Paul Hunter | 8
16 | (England) Stephen Lee | 9
50 | (Wales) Mark Bennett | 5
15 | (Wales) Darren Morgan | 9
54 | (Wales) Dominic Dale | 2
23 | (Republic of Ireland) Fergal O'Brien | 2
80 | (England) Bradley Jones | 9
20 | (England) Mark King | 9
90 | (England) Peter Lines | 4
6 | (England) John Parrott | 9
69 | (England) Paul Wykes | 1
7 | (England) Ronnie O'Sullivan | 9
97 | (Scotland) Marcus Campbell | 6
29 | (Northern Ireland) Terry Murphy | 9
64 | (England) Chris Scanlon | 8
17 | (England) Gary Wilkinson | 9
36 | (England) Willie Thorne | 7
12 | (Thailand) James Wattana | 9
58 | (Wales) Wayne Jones | 6
13 | (England) Steve Davis | 2
62 | (Northern Ireland) Gerard Greene | 9
19 | (England) Andy Hicks | 9
105 | (England) Lee Richardson | 8
32 | (Scotland) Billy Snaddon | 6
35 | (New Zealand) Dene O'Kane | 9
2 | (Scotland) John Higgins | 4
85 | (England) Gary Ponting | 9

Round 2 (Last 32); Best of 17 frames
3 | (Republic of Ireland) Ken Doherty | 4
30 | (England) Neal Foulds | 9
25 | (Scotland) Chris Small | 4
16 | (England) Stephen Lee | 9
15 | (Wales) Darren Morgan | 9
80 | (England) Bradley Jones | 6
20 | (England) Mark King | 9
6 | (England) John Parrott | 6
7 | (England) Ronnie O'Sullivan | 9
29 | (Northern Ireland) Terry Murphy | 5
17 | (England) Gary Wilkinson | 9
12 | (Thailand) James Wattana | 8
62 | (Northern Ireland) Gerard Greene | 9
19 | (England) Andy Hicks | 8
35 | (New Zealand) Dene O'Kane | 5
85 | (England) Gary Ponting | 9

Round 3 (Last 16); Best of 17 frames
30 | (England) Neal Foulds | 2
16 | (England) Stephen Lee | 9
15 | (Wales) Darren Morgan | 5
20 | (England) Mark King | 9
7 | (England) Ronnie O'Sullivan | 9
17 | (England) Gary Wilkinson | 4
62 | (Northern Ireland) Gerard Greene | 9
85 | (England) Gary Ponting | 6

Quarter-finals; Best of 17 frames
16 | (England) Stephen Lee | 9
20 | (England) Mark King | 2
7 | (England) Ronnie O'Sullivan | 9
62 | (Northern Ireland) Gerard Greene | 6

Semi-final; Best of 17 frames
16 | (England) Stephen Lee | 4
7 | (England) Ronnie O'Sullivan | 9

== Final ==
Final: Best of 19 frames. Referee: John Williams; The Guild Hall, Preston, England, 30 November 1997.
| Stephen Hendry (1); Scotland | 6–10 | Ronnie O'Sullivan (7); England |
First session: 103–29 (89), 75–37, 13–78 (78), 10–115 (78), 63–44 (57), 88–16 (67), 28–67, 73–21 (68), 33–98 (98); Second session: 23–75, 0–89 (89), 0–72, 0–79 (54), 0–82, 80–1, 17–70 (70)
| 89 | Highest break | 98 |
| 0 | Century breaks | 0 |
| 4 | 50+ breaks | 6 |

== Qualifying ==
1st Round Best of 11 frames

| Player | Score | Player |
|---|---|---|
| (Republic of Ireland) Michael Judge (56) | 3–6 | (England) John Read (86) |
| (Scotland) Euan Henderson (44) | 1–6 | (England) Sean Storey (82) |
| (Scotland) Jamie Burnett (38) | 6–1 | (Scotland) Craig MacGillivray (159) |
| (England) David Finbow (39) | 4–6 | (England) Troy Shaw (131) |
| (England) Tony Jones (60) | 6–3 | (Scotland) John Lardner (130) |
| (Wales) Paul Davies (48) | 6–4 | (England) Steve Judd (92) |
| (Northern Ireland) Jason Prince (42) | 6–4 | (England) Matthew Couch (94) |
| (Scotland) Graeme Dott (33) | 5–6 | (England) David Gray (152) |
| (England) Joe Johnson (52) | 3–6 | (Australia) Quinten Hann (104) |
| (Wales) Anthony Davies (61) | 3–6 | (Scotland) Martin Dziewialtowski (116) |
| (England) Dean Reynolds (51) | 6–3 | (Republic of Ireland) Stephen O'Connor (106) |
| (Pakistan) Shokat Ali (59) | 6–4 | (England) Karl Payne (77) |
| (England) Jason Ferguson (37) | 5–6 | (England) Ian McCulloch (76) |
| (Wales) Matthew Stevens (53) | 6–3 | (England) Jamie Woodman (71) |
| (Northern Ireland) Dennis Taylor (34) | 6–2 | (England) Wayne Brown (99) |
| (England) Jonathan Birch (45) | 6–0 | (England) Mark Gray (150) |

| Player | Score | Player |
|---|---|---|
| (England) Karl Broughton (41) | 6–2 | (Wales) Lee Walker (79) |
| (England) David Roe (49) | 4–6 | (England) Karl Burrows (78) |
| (England) Paul Hunter (43) | 6–3 | (England) Nick Walker (67) |
| (Wales) Mark Bennett (50) | 6–4 | (England) Darren Clarke (84) |
| (Wales) Dominic Dale (54) | 6–5 | (England) Alfie Burden (122) |
| (Scotland) Drew Henry (40) | 5–6 | (England) Bradley Jones (80) |
| (England) Jimmy Michie (55) | 5–6 | (England) Peter Lines (90) |
| (England) Mark Davis (47) | 5–6 | (England) Paul Wykes (69) |
| (Wales) Tony Chappel (46) | 5–6 | (Scotland) Marcus Campbell (97) |
| (England) Chris Scanlon (64) | 6–4 | (England) Joe Perry (123) |
| (England) Willie Thorne (36) | 6–2 | (England) Peter McCullagh (162) |
| (Wales) Wayne Jones (58) | 6–4 | (England) Leigh Griffin (143) |
| (Northern Ireland) Gerard Greene (62) | 6–5 | (England) Ian Brumby (101) |
| (Netherlands) Stefan Mazrocis (65) | 5–6 | (England) Lee Richardson (105) |
| (New Zealand) Dene O'Kane (35) | 6–2 | (England) Stuart Pettman (87) |
| (England) Nick Pearce (57) | 4–6 | (England) Gary Ponting (85) |

== Century breaks ==
- 143, 121, 120, 105, 100 – Matthew Stevens
- 138, 129, 119, 115 – Anthony Hamilton
- 137, 121, 119, 115 – Stephen Lee
- 136 – Jamie Burnett
- 134, 115 – Peter Ebdon
- 131 – David Gray
- 130, 126, 113, 107 – Alan McManus
- 130, 100, 100 – Quinten Hann
- 130 – Dean Reynolds
- 124, 113, 105 – Ronnie O'Sullivan
- 124 – Mark Bennett
- 122 – Peter Lines
- 119, 116, 110, 108 – Darren Morgan
- 119 – Andy Hicks
- 116, 114 – Bradley Jones
- 116 – Stuart Pettman
- 115 – Mark Williams
- 113, 100 – Ian McCulloch
- 112, 111 – Karl Burrows
- 108, 106, 105, 101 – Martin Dziewialtowski
- 108 – Tony Chappel
- 107 – Rod Lawler
- 106 – Drew Henry
- 105 – Stephen Hendry
- 104 – Jason Prince
- 103 – Shokat Ali
- 103 – Stephen O'Connor
- 102 – John Higgins
- 102 – Gary Wilkinson
- 100 – Mick Price
- 100 – Marcus Campbell
- 100 – Dene O'Kane
