= Gary Ponting =

English snooker player

Personal information
- Born: 17 January 1975 (age 51)

Sport
- Country: England
- Sport: Snooker
- Professional: 1993–2002
- Highest ranking: 49 (1999/2000)
- Best ranking finish: Quarter-final (x2)

Gary Ponting (born 17 January 1975) is an English former professional snooker player.

== Career ==
Ponting was born in 1975, and turned professional in 1993. He reached the last 32 of the 1994 World Championship, losing 2–10 to Willie Thorne, and the same stage of the 1996 Thailand Open, where Peter Ebdon whitewashed him 5–0.

He then progressed to the last 16 of another four ranking events, most notably at the 1998 UK Championship, where he made five century breaks including a 138, which was the highest of his career.

He reached a career-high ranking of 49th for the 1999–2000 season, retaining his top-64 place until the start of the 2002–03 season. Having suffered a loss of form, however, he entered only one further tournament, the 2003 World Championship, where he lost 1–10 in qualifying to India's Manan Chandra.

By 2003, Ponting's ranking had slipped to 73rd and he lost his professional status at the age of 28.

== Performance and rankings timeline ==
Tournament	1993/ 94		1994/ 95	1995/ 96	1996/ 97	1997/ 98	1998/ 99	1999/ 00	2000/ 01	2001/ 02	2002/ 03
Ranking	(Note: New players on the Main Tour don't have a ranking)		173	113	74	85	75	49	53	53	(Note: He was an amateur)
Ranking tournaments
LG Cup (Note: The event was called the Grand Prix (1993/1994–2000/2001))	LQ		LQ	LQ	1R	LQ	LQ	1R	WD	LQ	A
British Open	LQ		LQ	LQ	LQ	QF	LQ	LQ	QF	LQ	A
UK Championship	LQ		LQ	LQ	LQ	3R	3R	1R	LQ	LQ	A
Welsh Open	LQ		LQ	LQ	LQ	1R	1R	1R	1R	LQ	A
European Open (Note: The event was called the Irish Open (1998/1999))	LQ		LQ	LQ	LQ	NH	LQ	Not Held		LQ	A
Scottish Open (Note: The event was called the International Open (1993/1994-1996/1997))	1R		LQ	3R	LQ	LQ	LQ	3R	LQ	1R	A
World Championship	1R		LQ	LQ	LQ	LQ	LQ	LQ	LQ	LQ	LQ
Non-ranking tournaments
The Masters	A		LQ	LQ	LQ	LQ	LQ	LQ	LQ	LQ	A
Former ranking tournaments
Asian Classic (Note: The event was called the Dubai Classic (1993/1994-1994/1995) and the Thailand Classic (1995/1996))	LQ		LQ	LQ	LQ	Tournament Not Held					
German Masters (Note: The event was called the German Open (1995/1996-1997/1998))	Not Held			LQ	LQ	WD	NR	Tournament Not Held			
Malta Grand Prix	NH		Non-Ranking Event					LQ	NR	Not Held	
China Open (Note: The event was called the China International (1997/1998-1998/1999))	Tournament Not Held					NR	LQ	LQ	LQ	LQ	NH
Thailand Masters (Note: The event was called the Thailand Open (1993/1994-1996/1997))	LQ		LQ	1R	LQ	LQ	LQ	LQ	LQ	LQ	NR
Former non-ranking tournaments
Strachan Challenge	LQ	1R	Tournament Not Held								

Performance table legend
LQ	lost in the qualifying draw	#R	lost in the early rounds of the tournament (WR = Wildcard round, RR = Round robin)	QF	lost in the quarter-finals
SF	lost in the semi–finals	F	lost in the final	W	won the tournament
DNQ	did not qualify for the tournament	A	did not participate in the tournament	WD	withdrew from the tournament

NH / Not Held	means an event was not held.
NR / Non-Ranking Event	means an event is/was no longer a ranking event.
R / Ranking Event	means an event is/was a ranking event.
MR / Minor-Ranking Event	means an event is/was a minor-ranking event.
