= 2000 Scottish Open (snooker) =

2000 Regal Scottish Open
Tournament information
- Dates: 28 March – 9 April 2000
- Venue: AECC
- City: Aberdeen
- Country: Scotland
- Organisation: WPBSA
- Format: Ranking event
- Total prize fund: £400,000
- Winner's share: £62,000
- Highest break: Ronnie O'Sullivan (ENG) (147)

Final
- Champion: Ronnie O'Sullivan (ENG)
- Runner-up: Mark Williams (WAL)
- Score: 9–1

The 2000 Scottish Open (officially the 2000 Regal Scottish Open) was a professional ranking snooker tournament, that took place between 28 March and 9 April 2000 at the AECC, Aberdeen, Scotland. Stephen Hendry, was the defending champion but he lost 2–5 in the last 16 to Matthew Stevens.

Ronnie O'Sullivan won the tournament by defeating Mark Williams nine frames to one in the final. O'Sullivan made a 147 maximum break in frame four of his 5–4 victory over Quinten Hann in the last 32. Stephen Maguire had also made a 147 in the qualifying stages (not televised) so this marked the first time that two maximum breaks had been made in the same ranking tournament.

== Main draw ==
Last 64; Best of 9 frames
(Scotland) Stephen Hendry	5
(Wales) Lee Walker	0
(England) Andy Hicks	4
(England) Craig Harrison	5
(Wales) Matthew Stevens	5
(Belgium) Patrick Delsemme	1
(England) Brian Morgan	2
(England) Steve James	5
(Republic of Ireland) Fergal O'Brien	5
(England) Mark Gray	1
(Thailand) James Wattana	5
(England) Peter Lines	2
(England) Stephen Lee	w/d
(England) Nick Dyson	w/o
(Scotland) Graeme Dott	5
(England) Sean Storey	2
(England) John Parrott	3
(England) Ali Carter	5
(Northern Ireland) Terry Murphy	3
(Wales) Paul Davies	5
(England) Steve Davis	5
(Scotland) David McLellan	0
(England) Dave Harold	5
(England) Mick Price	3
(England) Jimmy White	4
(Scotland) Marcus Campbell	5
(Wales) Darren Morgan	3
(England) Ian Brumby	5
(England) Ronnie O'Sullivan	5
(England) Dave Finbow	4
(Australia) Quinten Hann	5
(England) Wayne Brown	0
(Wales) Mark Williams	5
(Scotland) John Lardner	1
(Scotland) Jamie Burnett	3
(Iceland) Kristján Helgason	5
(England) Mark King	5
(Scotland) Drew Henry	3
(Northern Ireland) Joe Swail	4
(England) Alfie Burden	5
(England) Anthony Hamilton	5
(England) Karl Broughton	1
(Scotland) Chris Small	5
(England) Rod Lawler	3
(Republic of Ireland) Ken Doherty	5
(England) Ian McCulloch	2
(England) Gary Wilkinson	5
(England) Jonathan Birch	4
(Scotland) Alan McManus	5
(Thailand) Noppadon Noppachorn	0
(Malta) Tony Drago	2
(Hong Kong) Marco Fu	5
(England) Paul Hunter	2
(England) Gary Ponting	5
(Scotland) Billy Snaddon	5
(England) Joe Perry	2
(England) Peter Ebdon	5
(England) Stuart Pettman	0
(Wales) Dominic Dale	5
(Scotland) Hugh Abernethy	0
(Scotland) John Higgins	5
(Wales) Anthony Davies	2
(England) Nigel Bond	2
(England) Martin Clark	5

Last 32; Best of 9 frames
(Scotland) Stephen Hendry	5
(England) Craig Harrison	2
(Wales) Matthew Stevens	5
(England) Steve James	1
(Republic of Ireland) Fergal O'Brien	5
(Thailand) James Wattana	2
(England) Nick Dyson	3
(Scotland) Graeme Dott	5
(England) Ali Carter	1
(Wales) Paul Davies	5
(England) Steve Davis	0
(England) Dave Harold	5
(Scotland) Marcus Campbell	5
(England) Ian Brumby	3
(England) Ronnie O'Sullivan	5
(Australia) Quinten Hann	4
(Wales) Mark Williams	5
(Iceland) Kristján Helgason	3
(England) Mark King	5
(England) Alfie Burden	2
(England) Anthony Hamilton	5
(Scotland) Chris Small	3
(Republic of Ireland) Ken Doherty	5
(England) Gary Wilkinson	2
(Scotland) Alan McManus	4
(Hong Kong) Marco Fu	5
(England) Gary Ponting	5
(Scotland) Billy Snaddon	0
(England) Peter Ebdon	5
(Wales) Dominic Dale	3
(Scotland) John Higgins	5
(England) Martin Clark	1

Last 16; Best of 9 frames
(Scotland) Stephen Hendry	2
(Wales) Matthew Stevens	5
(Republic of Ireland) Fergal O'Brien	3
(Scotland) Graeme Dott	5
(Wales) Paul Davies	1
(England) Dave Harold	5
(Scotland) Marcus Campbell	4
(England) Ronnie O'Sullivan	5
(Wales) Mark Williams	5
(England) Mark King	4
(England) Anthony Hamilton	5
(Republic of Ireland) Ken Doherty	2
(Hong Kong) Marco Fu	5
(England) Gary Ponting	0
(England) Peter Ebdon	1
(Scotland) John Higgins	5

Quarter-finals; Best of 9 frames
(Wales) Matthew Stevens	3
(Scotland) Graeme Dott	5
(England) Dave Harold	1
(England) Ronnie O'Sullivan	5
(Wales) Mark Williams	5
(England) Anthony Hamilton	2
(Hong Kong) Marco Fu	5
(Scotland) John Higgins	3

Semi-finals; Best of 11 frames
(Scotland) Graeme Dott	5
(England) Ronnie O'Sullivan	6
(Wales) Mark Williams	6
(Hong Kong) Marco Fu	5

Final; Best of 17 frames
(England) Ronnie O'Sullivan	9
(Wales) Mark Williams	1

== Final ==
Final: Best of 17 frames. AECC, Aberdeen, Scotland. 9 April 2000.
Ronnie O'Sullivan; England	9–1	Mark Williams; Wales
Afternoon: 75–68 (O'Sullivan 59 + re-spotted black, Williams 68), 85–5 (65), 69–0, 75–13, 65–53 (60), 24–69, 76–48 (67), 79–32 (69); Evening: 71–0 (57), 94–1 (58)
69	Highest break	68
0	Century breaks	0
7	50+ breaks	1
