= Scottish Open (snooker) =

Snooker tournament

- Part of the Home Nations Series

Tournament information
- Venue: Meadowbank Sports Centre
- Location: Edinburgh
- Country: Scotland
- Established: 1981
- Organisation(s): World Snooker Tour
- Format: Ranking event
- Total prize fund: £550,400
- Winner's share: £100,000
- Recent edition: 2025
- Current champion: Chris Wakelin (ENG)

The Scottish Open is a ranking professional snooker tournament held in the United Kingdom. The tournament had many name changes in its history, with former names such as the International Open, Matchroom Trophy and Players Championship. Apart from a hiatus in the 1990/1991 and 1991/1992 seasons, the tournament remained a ranking event until 2003/2004. In the 2012/2013 season the tournament was added back to the calendar as part of the Players Tour Championship minor-ranking series.

On 29 April 2015, Barry Hearn announced it would return to the main tour in 2016 at the Emirates Arena Glasgow, as part of the new Home Nations Series with the existing Welsh Open, and the new English Open and Northern Ireland Open tournaments. The winner of the Scottish Open is awarded the Stephen Hendry Trophy, which is named in honour of the Scottish seven-time world champion. The reigning champion is Chris Wakelin.

== History ==
The tournament began in 1981 as the International Open at the Assembly Rooms in Derby, and became the following year the second ranking event after the World Championship. The event moved to the Eldon Square in Newcastle upon Tyne. Until 1984 the event was sponsored by Jameson Whiskey.

In 1985 the event moved to the Trentham Gardens in Stoke-on-Trent and was renamed (for this year only) to the Matchroom Trophy due to sponsorship from Matchroom and Goya. The International Open name returned the following year and the sponsorship was overtaken by BCE (1986 and 1989) and Fidelity Unit Trusts (1987 and 1988). After 1989 the event went on a two-year hiatus.

The event returned in the 1992/1993 season with the sponsorship of Sky Sports. The event was moved to the second half of the season and was played at the Plymouth Pavilions. The event was moved again in 1994, this time to the Bournemouth International Centre. After an unsponsored year Sweater Shop took over for 1995 and 1996. In 1997 the event was moved to the Aberdeen Exhibition Centre and it was sponsored by Highland Spring.

In 1998 the event was renamed to Scottish Open, and it was sponsored by Imperial Tobacco through their Regal brand, who also sponsored the Scottish Masters and Welsh Open. In 2003 the event was moved to Royal Highland Centre in Edinburgh. For the first time in twelve years no top 16 player reached the final. The event than was renamed to the Players Championship for 2004, as it became the final event in the LG Electronics Tour. The event was sponsored by Daily Record and held at the SECC in Glasgow. After the event Sky decided not to renew their contract, and without television coverage the event was dropped. The event was added back to the calendar in the 2012/2013 season as minor-ranking tournament and was known as the Scottish Open. It was held at Ravenscraig as the fifth event of the European Tour.

In 2015 Barry Hearn announced that the tournament would return in the 2016/17 season, held in Glasgow, as part of the Home Nations Series events, which would feature tournaments in the other home nations of snooker and have a one million pound bonus.

Steve Davis was the tournament's most prolific winner, with a record 6 wins from 8 finals. This included a 9–0 whitewash of Dennis Taylor in the 1981 final. There have been eight maximum breaks in the history of the tournament, out of which two were made at the 2000 event: one by Stephen Maguire at the first qualifying round against Phaitoon Phonbun, and the other by Ronnie O'Sullivan in the last 32 against Quinten Hann. In 2012 Kurt Maflin achieved a 147 in the last 32 against Stuart Carrington. In 2017, eventual runner-up Cao Yupeng made a maximum break in his first round match against Andrew Higginson, and the following year, John Higgins compiled his ninth career 147 in his second round match against Gerard Greene. In 2020, Zhou Yuelong made a maximum break in his first round match with Peter Lines, and in 2021 Xiao Guodong made the first maximum break of his career in his qualifying match against Fraser Patrick. The most recent maximum break was made in 2022 by Judd Trump in his second-round match against Mitchell Mann.

== Winners ==
Year	Winner	Runner-up	Final score	Venue	City	Season
International Open (non-ranking, 1981)
1981	Steve Davis (ENG)	Dennis Taylor (NIR)	9–0	Assembly Rooms	Derby, England	1981/82
International Open (ranking, 1982–1984)
1982	Tony Knowles (ENG)	David Taylor (ENG)	9–6	Assembly Rooms	Derby, England	1982/83
1983	Steve Davis (ENG)	Cliff Thorburn (CAN)	9–4	Eldon Square Recreation Centre	Newcastle-upon-Tyne, England	1983/84
1984	Steve Davis (ENG)	Tony Knowles (ENG)	9–2	Eldon Square Recreation Centre	Newcastle-upon-Tyne, England	1984/85
Matchroom Trophy (ranking, 1985)
1985	Cliff Thorburn (CAN)	Jimmy White (ENG)	12–10	Trentham Gardens	Stoke-on-Trent, England	1985/86
International Open (ranking, 1986–1997)
1986	Neal Foulds (ENG)	Cliff Thorburn (CAN)	12–9	Trentham Gardens	Stoke-on-Trent, England	1986/87
1987	Steve Davis (ENG)	Cliff Thorburn (CAN)	12–5	Trentham Gardens	Stoke-on-Trent, England	1987/88
1988	Steve Davis (ENG)	Jimmy White (ENG)	12–6	Trentham Gardens	Stoke-on-Trent, England	1988/89
1989	Steve Davis (ENG)	Stephen Hendry (SCO)	9–4	Trentham Gardens	Stoke-on-Trent, England	1989/90
1993	Stephen Hendry (SCO)	Steve Davis (ENG)	10–6	Plymouth Pavilions	Plymouth, England	1992/93
1994	John Parrott (ENG)	James Wattana (THA)	9–5	Bournemouth International Centre	Bournemouth, England	1993/94
1995	John Higgins (SCO)	Steve Davis (ENG)	9–5	Bournemouth International Centre	Bournemouth, England	1994/95
1996	John Higgins (SCO)	Rod Lawler (ENG)	9–3	Link Centre	Swindon, England	1995/96
1997	Stephen Hendry (SCO)	Tony Drago (MLT)	9–1	Aberdeen Exhibition and Conference Centre	Aberdeen, Scotland	1996/97
Scottish Open (ranking, 1998–2003)
1998	Ronnie O'Sullivan (ENG)	John Higgins (SCO)	9–5	Aberdeen Exhibition and Conference Centre	Aberdeen, Scotland	1997/98
1999	Stephen Hendry (SCO)	Graeme Dott (SCO)	9–1	Aberdeen Exhibition and Conference Centre	Aberdeen, Scotland	1998/99
2000	Ronnie O'Sullivan (ENG)	Mark Williams (WAL)	9–1	Aberdeen Exhibition and Conference Centre	Aberdeen, Scotland	1999/00
2001	Peter Ebdon (ENG)	Ken Doherty (IRL)	9–7	Aberdeen Exhibition and Conference Centre	Aberdeen, Scotland	2000/01
2002	Stephen Lee (ENG)	David Gray (ENG)	9–2	Aberdeen Exhibition and Conference Centre	Aberdeen, Scotland	2001/02
2003	David Gray (ENG)	Mark Selby (ENG)	9–7	Royal Highland Centre	Edinburgh, Scotland	2002/03
Players Championship (ranking, 2004)
2004	Jimmy White (ENG)	Paul Hunter (ENG)	9–7	Scottish Exhibition and Conference Centre	Glasgow, Scotland	2003/04
Scottish Open (minor-ranking, 2012)
2012	Ding Junhui (CHN)	Anthony McGill (SCO)	4–2	Ravenscraig Regional Sports Facility	Ravenscraig, Scotland	2012/13
Scottish Open (ranking, 2016–present)
2016	Marco Fu (HKG)	John Higgins (SCO)	9–4	Commonwealth Arena and Sir Chris Hoy Velodrome	Glasgow, Scotland	2016/17
2017	Neil Robertson (AUS)	Cao Yupeng (CHN)	9–8	Commonwealth Arena and Sir Chris Hoy Velodrome	Glasgow, Scotland	2017/18
2018	Mark Allen (NIR)	Shaun Murphy (ENG)	9–7	Commonwealth Arena and Sir Chris Hoy Velodrome	Glasgow, Scotland	2018/19
2019	Mark Selby (ENG)	Jack Lisowski (ENG)	9–6	Commonwealth Arena and Sir Chris Hoy Velodrome	Glasgow, Scotland	2019/20
2020	Mark Selby (ENG)	Ronnie O'Sullivan (ENG)	9–3	Marshall Arena	Milton Keynes, England	2020/21
2021	Luca Brecel (BEL)	John Higgins (SCO)	9–5	Venue Cymru	Llandudno, Wales	2021/22
2022	Gary Wilson (ENG)	Joe O'Connor (ENG)	9–2	Meadowbank Sports Centre	Edinburgh, Scotland	2022/23
2023	Gary Wilson (ENG)	Noppon Saengkham (THA)	9–5	Meadowbank Sports Centre	Edinburgh, Scotland	2023/24
2024	Lei Peifan (CHN)	Wu Yize (CHN)	9–5	Meadowbank Sports Centre	Edinburgh, Scotland	2024/25
2025	Chris Wakelin (ENG)	Chang Bingyu (CHN)	9–2	Meadowbank Sports Centre	Edinburgh, Scotland	2025/26
2026			–	Meadowbank Sports Centre	Edinburgh, Scotland	2026/27
