= Surinder Gill =

English snooker player

Personal information
- Born: 20 January 1968 (age 58) Blackpool, Lancashire, England

Sport
- Country: England
- Sport: Snooker
- Professional: 1991–1997, 1998/1999, 2001/2002
- Highest ranking: 97 (1996/1997)
- Best ranking finish: Last 32 (x1)

Surinder Gill (born 20 January 1968) is an English former professional snooker player who competed on the main tour in the 1990s and early 2000s.

== Career ==
Born in 1968, Gill turned professional in 1991. He first made progress in a ranking event at the 1993 Asian Open, where he beat Craig Harrison, Andy Hicks and Jason Whittaker before losing 4–5 to Ian Graham in the last 96; he also reached the last 128 at the 1993 World Championship, losing 9–10 to Robert Foxall.

The 1993/1994 season brought some success for Gill, with a run to the last 64 at the 1993 UK Championship. There, victories over five players including Robert Marshall set up a match against Mike Hallett, which Hallett won 5–3.

At the 1994 World Championship, Gill defeated Peter McCullagh 5–1, veteran Ray Edmonds 5–3, Steve Judd 10–6, Jonathan Birch 10–7, Matthew Couch 10–8 and Mark Bennett 10–7 to qualify for the main stages at the Crucible Theatre for the first time. Drawn against incumbent World Champion Stephen Hendry, Gill was outclassed by the Scot; although he took the sixth frame 73–35, he eventually lost 1–10.

Gill next progressed beyond the last-96 stage of a tournament during the 1995/1996 season, when he reached the last 64 at both the UK Championship and the World Championship. In the former, he led Nigel Bond 3–2 but lost 3–9, while his attempt to qualify for a second Crucible appearance - featuring victories over Nick Pearce, David Taylor and Taylor's close friend Alex Higgins - was ended by a 7–10 loss to Danny Fowler.

Having begun the 1996/1997 season ranked 97th, a career-best, he finished it with a 5–10 defeat to Barry Pinches in qualifying for the 1997 World Championship; Pinches would be eliminated in the last 64 but both he, ranked 83rd, and Gill, the world number 120, lost their places on the professional tour at the season's conclusion.

Gill won only three matches the following year, all in the 1998 World Championship, but these were sufficient for him to return to the main tour for 1998/1999. That season's only highlight was a run to the last 96 at the 1999 Thailand Masters, where Pearce beat him 5–2.

After competing as an amateur for two years, Gill reached the final of a UK Tour event in 2000, losing 4–6 to Adrian Rosa, and entered the professional tier once more for the 2001/2002 season.

However, he won only two more matches; the last, a 5–0 whitewash of Pearce in the 2002 Welsh Open, was Gill's final win as a professional. Finishing the season ranked 116th, he was relegated once more from the tour, aged 34.

Attempts to re-qualify the following season proved unsuccessful, although Gill reached the second qualifying round of the 2005 World Championship, where Martin Gould defeated him 5–2.
