= Steve Prest =

English snooker player and coach (1966–2009)

Personal information
- Born: 19 May 1966 Claro, Yorkshire, England
- Died: 13 May 2009 (aged 43) Harrogate, North Yorkshire

Sport
- Country: England
- Sport: Snooker
- Professional: 1991–1997, 1998–1999
- Highest ranking: 149 (1991–1992)

Steven Robert Prest (19 May 1966 – 13 May 2009) was an English professional snooker player and coach.

== Playing career ==
Prest was born in Claro, Yorkshire, England. He finished his first professional snooker season, from 1991 to 1992, ranked 149th in the world, which would be the highest position he would reach, and was relegated from the tour in 1997, although he regained his place for the 1998–99 season. Prest reached the last 64 of two ranking events – the 1991 Dubai Classic, where he lost 4–5 to Dene O'Kane, and the 1993 International Open, where he was defeated 1–5 by Eddie Charlton.

== Coaching career ==
Prest was an accredited World Snooker coach. He was the manager and coach of Shaun Murphy, the 2005 World Snooker Champion.

In the early 2000s, he coached Neil Robertson of Australia, also working with Simon Bedford from Bradford. In addition to this, Prest became Ronnie O'Sullivan's long-potting coach, in March 2009, but died at the end of May that year from peritonitis, aged 43.
