= Sweater Shop =

British clothing company

The Sweater Shop Ltd
- Type: Private
- Industry: Clothing Retail and Manufacture
- Founded: 20 March 1973; 53 years ago in Barwell, England
- Founder: Margaret Wood
- Defunct: 28 April 1995
- Fate: Management Buyout
- Headquarters: Syston, Borough of Charnwood, England
- Products: Sweatshirts; T-shirts; Bags; Scarves; Belts; Wallets

The Sweater Shop was a Leicestershire, England, based clothing company with many national outlets.

== History ==
The Sweater Shop Ltd was established by Margaret Wood on 20 March 1973 in Barwell, Leicestershire.

The company was sold on 28 April 1995 to a management buyout for £150m.

=== Closure ===
In May 1998 the company went into receivership. At the time of closure it had 78 retail outlets. As of 2020, Sweater Shop (no 'The') is a separate company trading under the same brand name.

=== The Future ===
In early 2025, Margaret Wood's son, Tádhg, said that he was looking at bringing the brand to a new audience as he owns the trademark "The Sweater Shop". It is not yet known how he plans to do this.

== Structure ==
It was headquartered in Syston in the Borough of Charnwood. It made its own products in factories in Leicester and Shepshed. It had a factory in Scotland in Cumnock, East Ayrshire that opened in 1992. On 24 November 1992 Diana, Princess of Wales officially opened the Scottish factory.
