= Roger Garrett (snooker player) =

English snooker player

Sport
- Country: England
- Sport: Snooker
- Professional: 1992–1995
- Highest ranking: 85 (1994/1995)

Roger Garrett is an English former professional snooker player.

== Career ==
Garrett turned professional in 1992. Prior to his joining the tour, he had notably compiled a total clearance directly from his break-off, scoring 140 at a tournament at Ilford Snooker Centre, believed to have been the first such clearance on record. In his first season, he reached the last 64 at the 1993 Asian Open; in qualifying, he had beaten eight players, including a 5–3 defeat of Rod Lawler in the last 96. Garrett was eliminated by Ken Doherty, who whitewashed him 5–0.

In the 1993/1994 season, Garrett again reached the last 64 at one ranking event, on this occasion the 1993 Grand Prix. He defeated Elliott Clark 5–3, Yasin Merchant 5–4, Paul Gibson 5–1, Jimmy Michie 5–2 and Tony Chappel 5–0, to face the Canadian Alain Robidoux. In their match, Garrett led 4–3, but Robidoux prevailed 4–5, winning the deciding frame with a break of 97.

The 1994/1995 season brought mild success, but also proved to be Garrett's last as a professional. He lost to Mark Bennett in the last 48 at the 1994 European Open, and at the 1995 International Open, beat Andrew Peters, Mehmet Husnu and Stephen Lee to qualify for the last 64.

However, shortly before his scheduled match against Dave Harold, Garrett was reported missing from his hotel room in Bournemouth, having left only his cue and dress-suit behind. Garrett withdrew from the following tournament, the 1995 Thailand Open, where he had reached the last 32 but had been selected to play in the wildcard round. Garrett never played snooker at competitive level after this; in his final match, at the Thailand Open, he had compiled a break of 128 in defeating Dene O'Kane 5–4.
