= Graham Horne =

Scottish snooker player

Personal information
- Born: 10 June 1971 (age 55)

Sport
- Country: Scotland
- Sport: Snooker
- Professional: 1991–2000
- Highest ranking: 73 (1997/1998)
- Best ranking finish: Last 32 (x2)

Graham Horne (born 10 June 1971) is a Scottish former professional snooker player.

== Career ==
Born in 1971, Horne turned professional in 1991. He reached the last 128 stage of a number of ranking tournaments over the next four seasons, before a run to the last 64 at the 1996 Thailand Open, where he was defeated 3–5 by Dave Finbow.

Horne went one round better in the 1997 edition of the Thailand Open, exiting 2–5 to James Wattana in the last 32. The best performance of his career came at the 1997 World Championship; ranked 113th at the season's start, Horne defeated Barry Mapstone 10–5, the young Joe Perry 10–8, Tony Chappel 10–6, Mark King 10–6 and Steve James 10–7 to set up an all-Scottish encounter, in the first round at the Crucible Theatre, with John Higgins. In the event, Horne led Higgins 3–1 and 4–3, but lost the match 6–10.

Although he rose forty places to be ranked 73rd at the end of the 1996/1997 season, this was still not sufficient for Horne to automatically retain his professional status. He entered qualifying tournaments the following season, and was successful enough to keep his place on the tour.

However, after a defeat by Steve Davis in the last 64 at the 1998 UK Championship, Horne never progressed this far in an event again; he played his final match against Gareth Chilcott in qualifying for the 1999 World Championship, losing 6–10.

Horne never played at competitive level following the defeat to Chilcott, and was relegated from the tour at the end of the 1999/2000 season, aged 28.
