= 1997 World Snooker Championship =

Professional snooker tournament

1997 Embassy World Snooker Championship
Tournament information
- Dates: 19 April – 5 May 1997
- Venue: Crucible Theatre
- City: Sheffield
- Country: England
- Organisation: WPBSA
- Format: Ranking event
- Total prize fund: £1,260,000
- Winner's share: £210,000
- Highest break: Ronnie O'Sullivan (ENG) (147)

Final
- Champion: Ken Doherty (IRL)
- Runner-up: Stephen Hendry (SCO)
- Score: 18–12

The 1997 World Snooker Championship (officially the 1997 Embassy World Snooker Championship) was a professional snooker tournament that took place from 19 April to 5 May 1997 at the Crucible Theatre in Sheffield, England, the 21st consecutive year that the World Snooker Championship was staged at the venue. Sponsored by cigarette brand Embassy, the tournament was the tenth and final ranking event of the 1996–97 season. The winner received £210,000 from a total prize fund of £1,260,000.

The top 16 players from the snooker world rankings were seeded through to the main stage at the Crucible, where they were joined by the 16 successful players from the nine qualifying rounds. The tournament featured seven Crucible debutants. Mark Williams was a seed upon his debut, only the second time this had happened since the 16-seed format was introduced in 1982. The other debutants were qualifiers Dominic Dale, Graeme Dott, Graham Horne, Bradley Jones, David McLellan, and Lee Walker.

Stephen Hendry was the defending champion, having defeated Peter Ebdon 18–12 in the 1996 final to win his sixth world title, his fifth consecutively. Ken Doherty claimed the only world title of his professional career with an 18–12 victory over Hendry in the final. This ended a record 29-match Crucible winning streak by Hendry, who had last lost in the quarter-finals of the 1991 edition. Doherty became the first World Champion from the Republic of Ireland and the second in snooker's modern era from outside the United Kingdom, following Cliff Thorburn at the 1980 edition. The main stage of the tournament produced 39 century breaks, of which the highest was a maximum break by Ronnie O'Sullivan, the first of his professional career, during his first-round match against Mick Price. Compiled in a time of 5 minutes and 8 seconds, it remains the fastest 147 in snooker history.

== Background ==
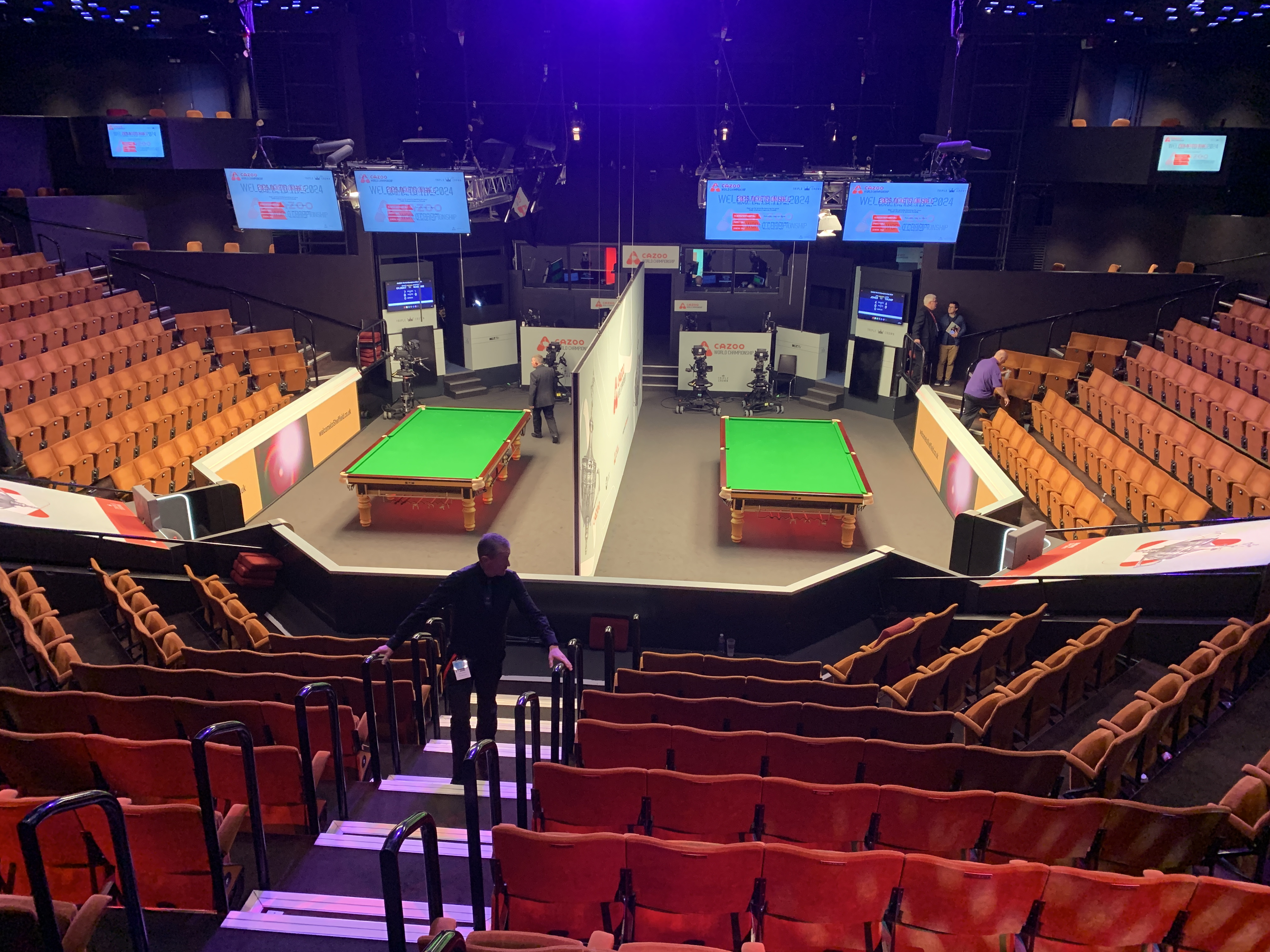
Setup of the arena at the Crucible Theatre, shown during the 2024 World Snooker Championship

The inaugural 1927 World Snooker Championship, then known as the Professional Championship of Snooker, took place at various venues in England between November 1926 and May 1927. Joe Davis won the final—held at Camkin's Hall in Birmingham from 9 to 12 May 1927—and went on to win the tournament 15 consecutive times before retiring undefeated after the 1946 edition (no tournaments were held from 1941 to 1945 because of World War II). The tournament went into abeyance after only two players contested the 1952 edition. The six editions of the World Professional Match-play Championship held between 1952 and 1957 are retroactively regarded as legitimate continuations of the World Snooker Championship, but that tournament was discontinued due to waning public interest in snooker in the post-war era. The world title was uncontested between 1958 and 1963.

Then-professional player Rex Williams was instrumental in reviving the World Snooker Championship on a challenge basis in 1964. John Pulman, winner of the 1957 World Professional Match-play Championship, defended the world title across seven challenge matches between 1964 and 1968. The World Snooker Championship reverted to an annual knockout tournament for the 1969 edition, marking the beginning of the championship's "modern era". The 1977 edition was the first staged at the Crucible Theatre in Sheffield, where it has remained since. As of 1997, the most successful players in the modern era were Ray Reardon, Steve Davis, and Stephen Hendry, each having won the title six times. Hendry was also the tournament's youngest winner, having captured his first title at the 1990 event, aged 21 years and 106 days. Reardon was the oldest winner, having secured his sixth title at the 1978 event, aged 45 years and 203 days.

== Overview ==
The 1997 edition of the tournament—the 28th successive year that the World Snooker Championship was contested through the modern knockout format—took place from 19 April to 5 May at the Crucible Theatre in Sheffield, England, the 21st consecutive year that the World Championship was staged at the venue. Sponsored by cigarette brand Embassy, it was the tenth and last ranking tournament of the 1996–97 season, held after the British Open. The defending champion was Stephen Hendry, who had defeated Peter Ebdon 18–12 in the final of the 1996 World Championship to win his sixth world title and fifth consecutively.

=== Format ===
The top 16 players in the snooker world rankings were seeded through to the main stage at the Crucible Theatre. They faced 16 players who progressed through the qualifying rounds. First-round matches were played as the best of 19 frames, held over two sessions. Second-round and quarter-final matches were played as the best of 25 frames, held over three sessions. The semi-final matches were played as the best of 33 frames, held over four sessions. The final was the best of 35 frames, also held over four sessions.

=== Prize fund ===
The winner of the event received £210,000 from a total prize fund of £1,260,000. The breakdown of prize money for this year is shown below:

- Winner: £210,000
- Runner-up: £126,000
- Semi-finalist: £63,000
- Quarter-finalist: £31,500
- Last 16: £16,800
- Last 32: £9,450
- Highest break: £18,000
- Maximum break: £147,000
- Total: £1,260,000

== Summary ==
=== Qualifying ===
There were nine rounds in the qualifying competition. The first eight qualifying rounds took place at the Norbreck Hotel, Blackpool, from 3 to 24 January 1997. The final qualifying round was played at Telford International Centre from 24 to 26 March. The first four rounds were played as the best of 9 frames, and the other rounds were the best of 19.

Karen Corr, the only woman in the competition and the reigning World Women's Snooker Champion, lost 2–5 to Peter Holland. The fourth-round match between Robby Foldvari and Phil Seaton lasted 353 minutes and was the sixth-longest best-of-nine-frame match in championship history, Foldvari having been involved in five of the longest seven. Seaton won in the deciding frame. World Amateur Championship titleholder Stuart Bingham won his second-round match against Eddie Glass 5–4 after being 1–3 behind. He then defeated Iwan Jones 5–3 before prevailing on the final black ball of the deciding frame against Garry Baldrey in round four.

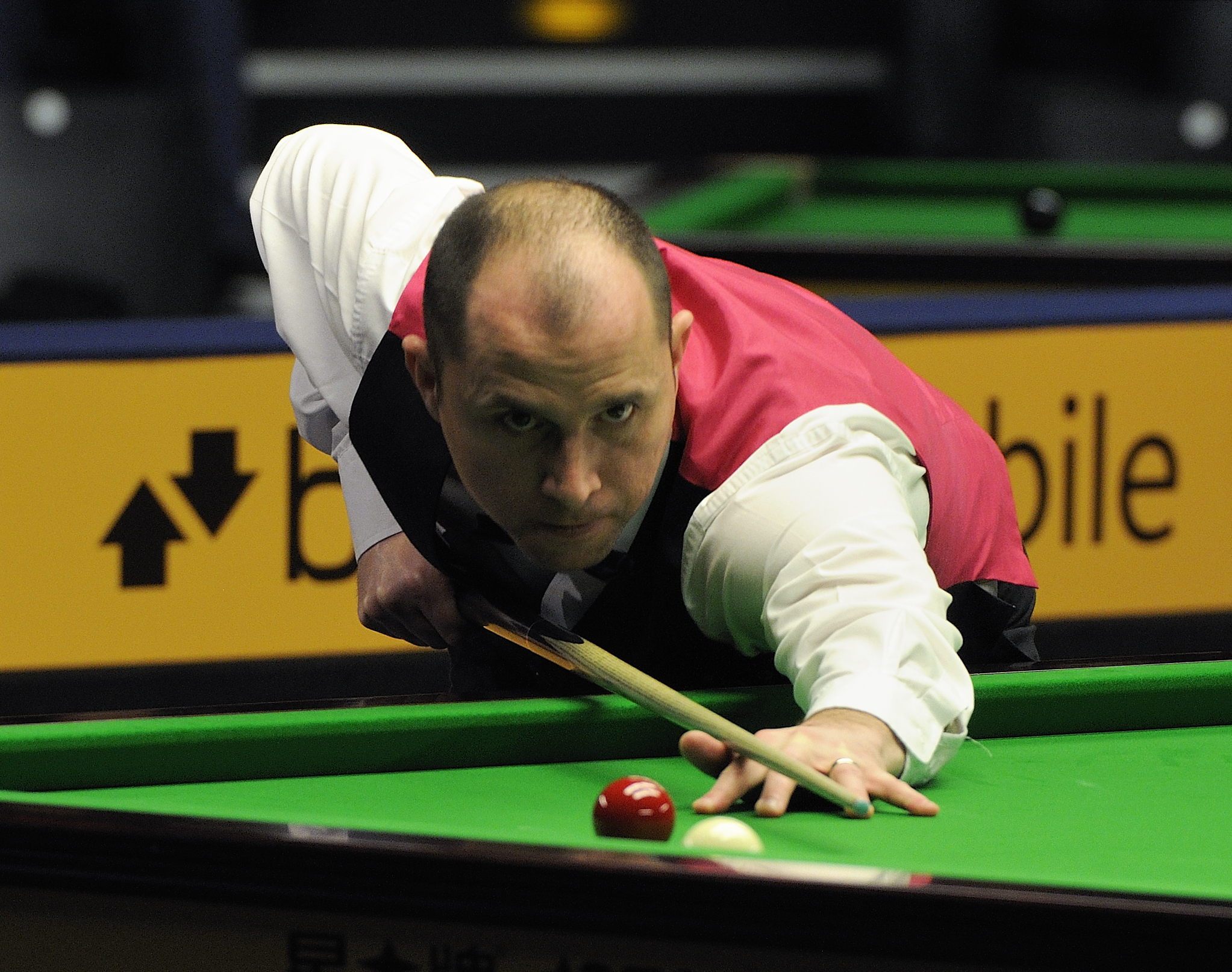
Facing Tony Meo in the qualifying rounds, Joe Perry (pictured in 2013) set a new record of 463 points without reply.

In the fifth round, Joe Perry set a new record of 463 unanswered points in a ranking tournament as he beat Tony Meo 10–2, which included breaks of 139 in the first frame and 142 in the third frame. The previous record was 454 points, set by Stephen Hendry at the 1994 UK Championship. Bingham won in the deciding frame for the third time in four matches, winning the last two frames to overcome Matt Wilson 10–9. Alex Higgins, the champion in 1972 and 1982, had been in court for a breach of the peace case two days before the start of his match against world number 205 Darren Limburg. Higgins led 5–1 and 8–3 but eventually lost 9–10, meaning that he dropped out of the top 64 places in the rankings and so did not automatically qualify for a place on the tour the following season.

The 1986 champion Joe Johnson lost 4–10 to Lee Walker in round seven, and Paul Hunter led Jimmy Michie 7–5 but lost 7–10. In the final qualifying round, the 1979 champion Terry Griffiths, who had not played competitively since the 1996 World Championship because he was focusing on his role as the WPBSA's director of coaching, beat Alfie Burden 10–4 from 1–3 behind. Dennis Taylor, the winner in 1985 but who had not qualified since 1994, was defeated 7–10 by world number 189 Walker. Dominic Dale won five successive frames from 5–6 to eliminate Willie Thorne 10–6. In all, ten of the players seeded 17 to 32 lost to players who had advanced from earlier rounds. The lowest-ranked player to qualify was world number 199 Bradley Jones, who won 10–4 against Dave Finbow.

Six players reached the main stage for the first time: Dale, Jones, Graeme Dott, Graham Horne, David McLellan, and Lee Walker. Four players shared the £2,000 prize for the highest break during the qualifying stages: Quinten Hann made a break of 142 in round one, which was matched in round three by Perry, Dale and Jason Weston.

=== First round ===
The first round took place from 19 to 24 April, each match played as the best of 19 frames over two sessions. The defending champion Stephen Hendry was on a streak of 25 consecutive matches without defeat at the Crucible, having last lost a match in the quarter-finals of the 1991 edition. He led qualifier Andy Hicks 5–1 and 6–3 in their first meeting and went on to win 10–6. "It was different from what I expected. Stephen [Hendry] dominates you and makes it difficult to get any rhythm going," Hicks said.

Seven players made their debut at the Crucible. Mark Williams was a seed upon his debut, only the second time—after Martin Clark in 1991—this had happened since the 16-seed format had been introduced in 1982. Williams, a three-time ranking event winner, faced Griffiths, who had already retired from the game and had only featured in one match during the season. Griffiths led 2–0 and 4–2, but Williams won three consecutive frames to secure a lead at the end of the first day of play. After the resumption, Griffiths got within one frame of victory at 9–7, but Williams forced a deciding frame, which he won. This was Griffiths' last professional match; he retired having played 999 frames at the Crucible.

Facing the world number 87 Dale, Tony Drago made a highest break of 64. In frame 18, while leading 9–8 and needing only one more frame to progress, Drago missed the black off its spot after potting the last red, allowing Dale to win by clearing the colours. In all, Dale made two breaks of 37, his highest of the match, and five breaks of 36. "I didn't feel any pressure playing the shot. I did well to get back into the frame and I couldn't believe it when the black didn't go down. I've had a good season but this was a real sickener to finish," Drago said. James Wattana led Dott 6–3 at the end of the first session. Dott won four consecutive frames in the second session and then forced a deciding frame with a break of 61. In the decider, Dott had the first scoring opportunity but left himself snookered after a long pot on a red. Wattana produced a break of 53 to win the match. "It was my lucky day. Graeme [Dott] played better than I did in the second half of the match," Wattana said.

The world number 2 John Higgins, who had won the 1997 European Open during the season, faced Horne, number 113 in the rankings. "I've left Sheffield twice feeling deeply disappointed and I don't think people expect me to win it now," Higgins said ahead of the match. In the first session, Higgins had his cue repaired by referee Lawrie Annandale. After this, Higgins compiled two century breaks of 111 and 134 and led Horne 5–4 after the first session. Higgins made another century in the second session and went on to claim a 10–6 victory. Horne's highest break of the match was 58. The world number 199 Jones led John Parrott 5–4 after the first session. Parrott compiled a 102 break in the second session and later forced a decider, which he won. He punched the air when he secured victory. "[Jones] played tremendously well and has commendable bottle. I take my hat off to him. I thought [he] would crack under pressure, particularly towards the end, but that wasn't the case. One of his safety shots in the last frame was the best I've ever seen," Parrott said.

Steve Davis took the first five frames against McLellan, who then won the sixth, aided by breaks of 32 and 55. Davis was 7–2 ahead after the first session and took all three frames of the second session for a 10–2 victory. The world number 189 Walker made a break of 87 in frame five as he built a 4–1 lead against Dave Harold. Harold then won three consecutive frames to tie the match, but Walker secured a 5–4 lead at the end of the session. In the second session, Walker led 7–4 and 9–5 before securing a 10–7 win. Peter Ebdon, runner-up the previous year, fell 2–6 behind the world number 81 Stefan Mazrocis after the first session. Mazrocis went on to win 10–3. Ken Doherty compiled breaks of 71 and 94 as he built a 3–0 lead against Mark Davis. Davis then tied the scores, but Doherty led 5–4 after the first session. Breaks of 84 and 92 aided Doherty to a 10–8 victory, while Davis did not produce a half-century during the second session.

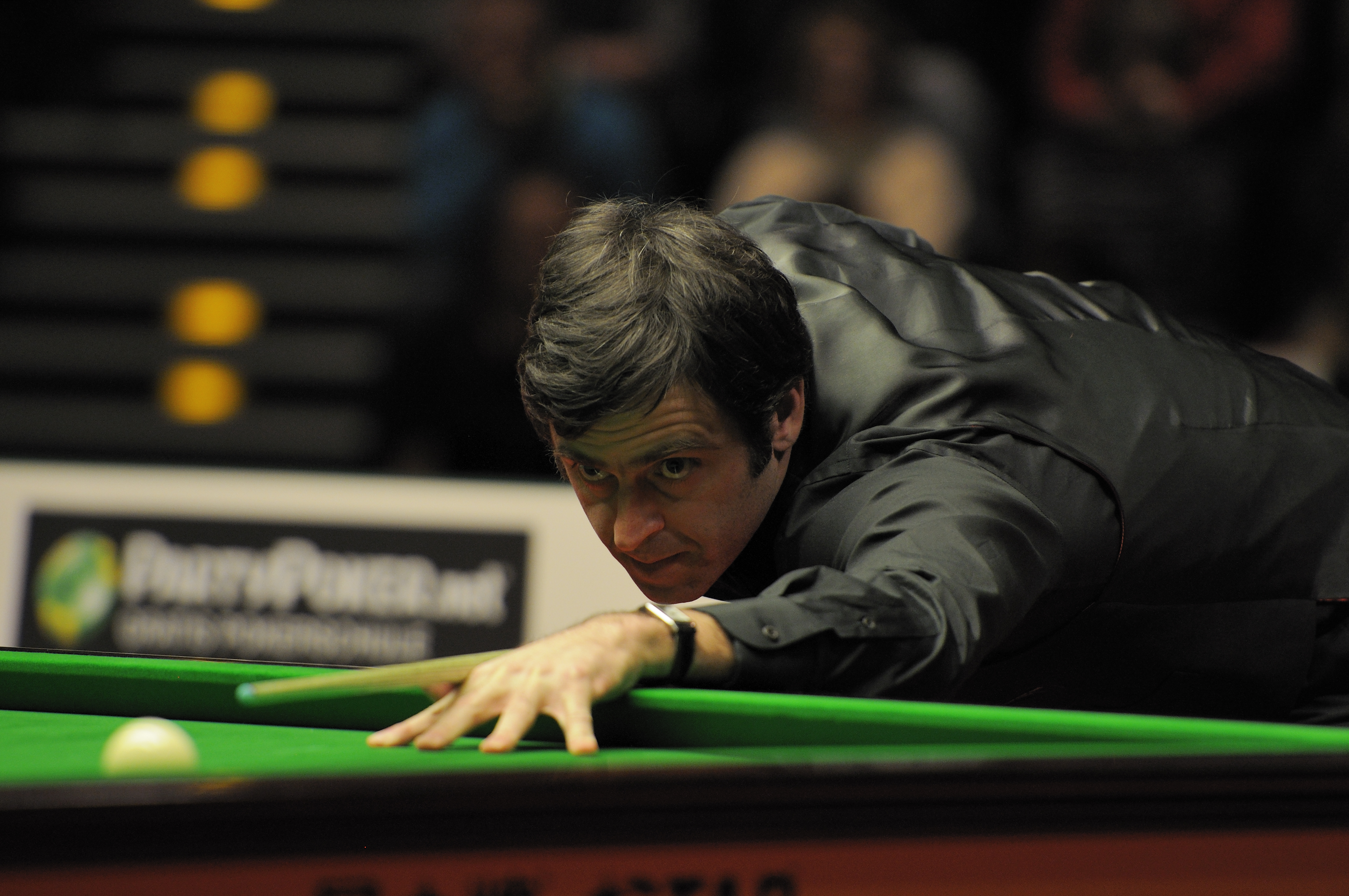
Ronnie O'Sullivan (pictured in 2012) made a maximum break in 5 minutes and 8 seconds, the fastest 147 in snooker history.

In frame 14 of his first-round match against Mick Price, Ronnie O'Sullivan compiled a maximum break in a time of 5 minutes and 8 seconds, making it the fastest 147 in snooker history. It was the fourth 147 in the history of the tournament and O'Sullivan's first in professional competition. He was awarded a prize of £147,000 for the maximum and also won the tournament's highest break prize of £18,000. "I thought it was on when I got to the second red. I was in the balls and all I could think was maxi[mum]. If I had stopped and thought I'd have probably missed. I was shaking like a leaf. I was in bits," O'Sullivan said. O'Sullivan also made breaks of 74, 82, 91, 86, and 74 and won the match 10–6. Billy Snaddon won the first three frames against Alan McManus, producing a 131 break in the second. McManus won frames four and five, but Snaddon was 6–3 in front after the first session. Snaddon extended his lead to four frames at 8–4. McManus came from behind to win frame 13 with a 65 clearance and also took the next after Snaddon went in-off after potting the last yellow ball. McManus went on to win the match in a decider. "I struggled to get to grips with the match all the way through, though in the end I was pleased at the way I got back into the match. Hopefully I will be able to relax more the next time I play," McManus said.

Jimmy White compiled a break of 125 as he took an 8–4 lead over Anthony Hamilton. Hamilton tied the scores with breaks of 78, 96, 65, and 52, and the match went to a decider, which Hamilton won with a 54 break. It was White's third first-round defeat in his 17 Crucible appearances. Brian Morgan was 3–5 behind against Alain Robidoux, but he recovered to lead 8–7. However, Robidoux compiled breaks of 58, 45, and 89 to take the next three frames and advance into the second round. Darren Morgan won the first four frames and then produced a break of 128 in the sixth to lead Gary Wilkinson 5–1. Wilkinson replied with breaks of 95, 56, and 91 to reduce Morgan's lead to 5–4 after the first session. In the second session, Morgan produced breaks of 71, 75, 64, and 47 as he took five of the six frames played, securing a 10–5 victory, which allowed him to remain in the top 16.

=== Second round ===
The second round took place from 24 to 28 April, each match played as the best of 25 frames over three sessions. Hendry met Williams, who had defeated him in the final of the 1997 British Open three weeks before. Williams built a 4–1 lead, but Hendry won three consecutive frames to tie the scores after the first session. In the second session, Williams twice led by two frames, but Hendry levelled once again and then won all five frames played in the third session, producing breaks of 66, 76, and 81 for a 13–8 victory. Facing McManus, Walker was two frames behind at the conclusion of the second session but took six of the seven frames played in the third session to win 13–10. "I've never seen [Walker] before, but I'm impressed. He's playing so well he could make it to the semis," McManus said. Walker attributed his improvements to practising with Darren Morgan.

O'Sullivan made a 133 break in the opening frame, but Morgan replied with four consecutive frames, including a 121 break in frame four. In the second session, breaks of 68, 52, and 46 gave O'Sullivan a 6–5 advantage. Morgan produced another century break, but O'Sullivan won the final frame of the session with a fluke on the blue ball, moving 9–7 ahead. In the final session, Morgan compiled breaks of 116, 59, 61, and 54 to force a decider, which he won with an 84 break. Morgan, whose mother had died months before, cried after the match. Robidoux fell 0–2 behind Mazrocis, but he recovered to lead 5–3, 8–3 and 12–7, making a 121 break in the third session. Mazrocis made a 127 break as he reduced Robidoux's lead to 12–9, but Robidoux took frame 22 with a 60 break for a 13–9 victory. Hamilton produced breaks including 50, 63, 94, and 117 as he built a 4–0 lead, scoring 414 points without reply. Parrott replied with breaks of 66, 66, 88, and 86 to level the match at the end of the first session. In the second session, Parrott forfeited frame 11 on the three-miss rule. "I don't think I have ever seen a ball roll off so much," he said. Parrott then won four consecutive frames to lead 9–7. Hamilton produced century breaks of 121 and 129 as he levelled the match at 11–11. Parrott won the next frame with a 133 break and went on to secure a 13–11 victory.

Doherty compiled two century breaks as he built a 6–2 lead against Davis. In the second session, he produced further breaks of 71, 62, 65, 96, 66, 54, and 68 as he extended his lead to 12–2. In frame 11, Doherty attempted a maximum break, but he missed the thirteenth red. Davis won frame 15, but Doherty sealed a 13–3 victory in the next, winning the match with a session to spare. "You can try too hard and sometimes when you do the wheels fall off and you have to sit there and suffer. It was a marvellous performance from Ken [Doherty]. I was totally annihilated," Davis said. "I haven't played like that for a couple of seasons. Every time I got in I seemed to score heavily. I have been putting in a lot of work coming into this and it's paying off," Doherty said. Higgins made four half-centuries in the first session as he took a 6–2 lead against Dale. He also took the first six frames of the second session and extended his advantage to ten frames at 12–2. Dale then made a century break of 110 and also took the last frame of the session. In the third session, Dale won the first frame with a 79 break, but Higgins sealed a 13–5 victory with a 101 break.

Wattana won the opening frame against Lee and also made a 112 break to go 3–1 ahead. Lee won the next two frames to tie the scores. In frame seven, Wattana required two snookers, but he secured the penalty points he needed and went on to win the frame. In the last frame of the session, Wattana missed a yellow ball off its spot and the scores were level at 4–4. Wattana won the first five frames of the second session and compiled an 80 break in the last as he moved 10–6 ahead. Lee won the first frame of the final session with a century break, but Wattana then took three in a row for a 13–7 victory.

=== Quarter-finals ===
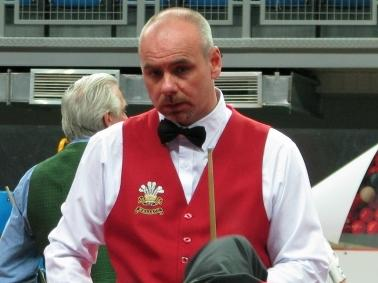
Darren Morgan (pictured in 2008) lost 10–13 to Stephen Hendry in the quarter-finals. He accused boxer Naseem Hamed, Hendry's friend, of distracting him during the match.

The quarter-finals took place on 29 and 30 April, each match played as the best of 25 frames over three sessions. Morgan produced breaks of 52, 84, and 77 as he built a 5–3 lead against Hendry in the first session. The first two frames of the second session were shared, before Morgan then lost position in frame 11 and missed a chance to go 7–4 in front. Hendry took four consecutive frames, making breaks including 54, 71, and 99. Morgan trailed 7–9 going into the last session, but he won the first two frames to tie the scores at 9–9. Hendry compiled breaks of 59 and 53 and also benefited from a miscue from Morgan in frame 22 to progress with a 13–10 scoreline. Morgan accused boxer Naseem Hamed, who was in the audience as Hendry's friend, of distracting him. "It was putting me off and getting Stephen [Hendry] in the mood so I politely asked for him to be moved so I couldn't see him. He has got an intimidating face," he said.

Doherty, who had never defeated Higgins, trailed 0–3, but recovered to win three consecutive frames, the last of them with a 65 clearance. The first session ended level at 4–4. Doherty made breaks of 91 and 68 in the second session to end it 9–7 ahead and further breaks of 61, 90, 67, and 116 in the final session for a 13–9 victory. "I cried when Alex [Higgins] and Dennis [Taylor] won the World Championship because I was from the same part of the world. It's nice to follow in their footsteps," Doherty said after securing a place in the semi-finals of the tournament for the first time in his career. Parrott, the 1991 World Champion, made a 129 break in the first frame, but he trailed Wattana 3–5 at the end of the first session. Parrott made breaks of 82, 69, and 129 in the second session, but breaks of 64, 56, and 93 allowed Wattana to maintain a two-frame lead. Wattana went on to win 13–10. Robidoux, playing in the World Championship quarter-finals for the first time, shared the first session with Walker and built a two-frame lead at the end of the second session. Walker reduced the deficit to one frame at the start of the last session, but Robidoux replied with a 113 break and then won three more frames for a 13–8 victory.

=== Semi-finals ===
The semi-finals took place from 1 to 3 May. For the first time, the semi-final matches were played as the best of 33 frames, having previously been the best of 31. It was the first time since the 1976 edition that no player from England reached the semi-finals. Robidoux and Doherty shared the eight frames of the first session. Doherty then won seven of the eight frames played in the second session to build an 11–5 lead. In the third, Robidoux reduced his deficit to five frames at 7–12, but Doherty then won five consecutive frames, featuring breaks of 76, 74, and 73, to win the match 17–7 with a session to spare. He became the first player from the Republic of Ireland to reach the final of the World Championship. "You have to be ruthless and put things like friendship out of your mind," said Doherty after defeating his friend Robidoux. "At the end I was sat there with a smile on my face like a Cheshire cat."

Wattana, who had previously reached the semi-finals of the World Championship at the 1993 edition, compiled breaks of 97 and 87 to win the first two frames against Hendry. Hendry then produced breaks of 64, 106, and 92 to take five consecutive frames, before Wattana secured the last of the session to trail 3–5. Hendry extended his lead by taking the first frame of the second session and also won the second with a century break, but Wattana won five of the next six to tie the match. Hendry produced breaks of 78, 66, 70, and 63 as he took the first four frames of the third session, ending it 14–10 in front. In the final session, Wattana compiled breaks of 76 and 70 to narrow his deficit to two frames at 13–15, but Hendry produced a century break of 114 and a break of 55 to win 17–13. An audience of 20 million people was reported to have watched the match in Thailand.

=== Final ===
The best-of-35-frame final took place over four sessions on 4 and 5 May between Hendry and Doherty. Both players had the same manager, Ian Doyle. Hendry was trying to win his seventh world title, having won the last five in a row. Alan Chamberlain refereed his first and only World Championship final. He was the first referee since Jim Thorpe in 1984 to officiate his first final, all finals since that year having been officiated by either John Williams, Len Ganley, or John Street.

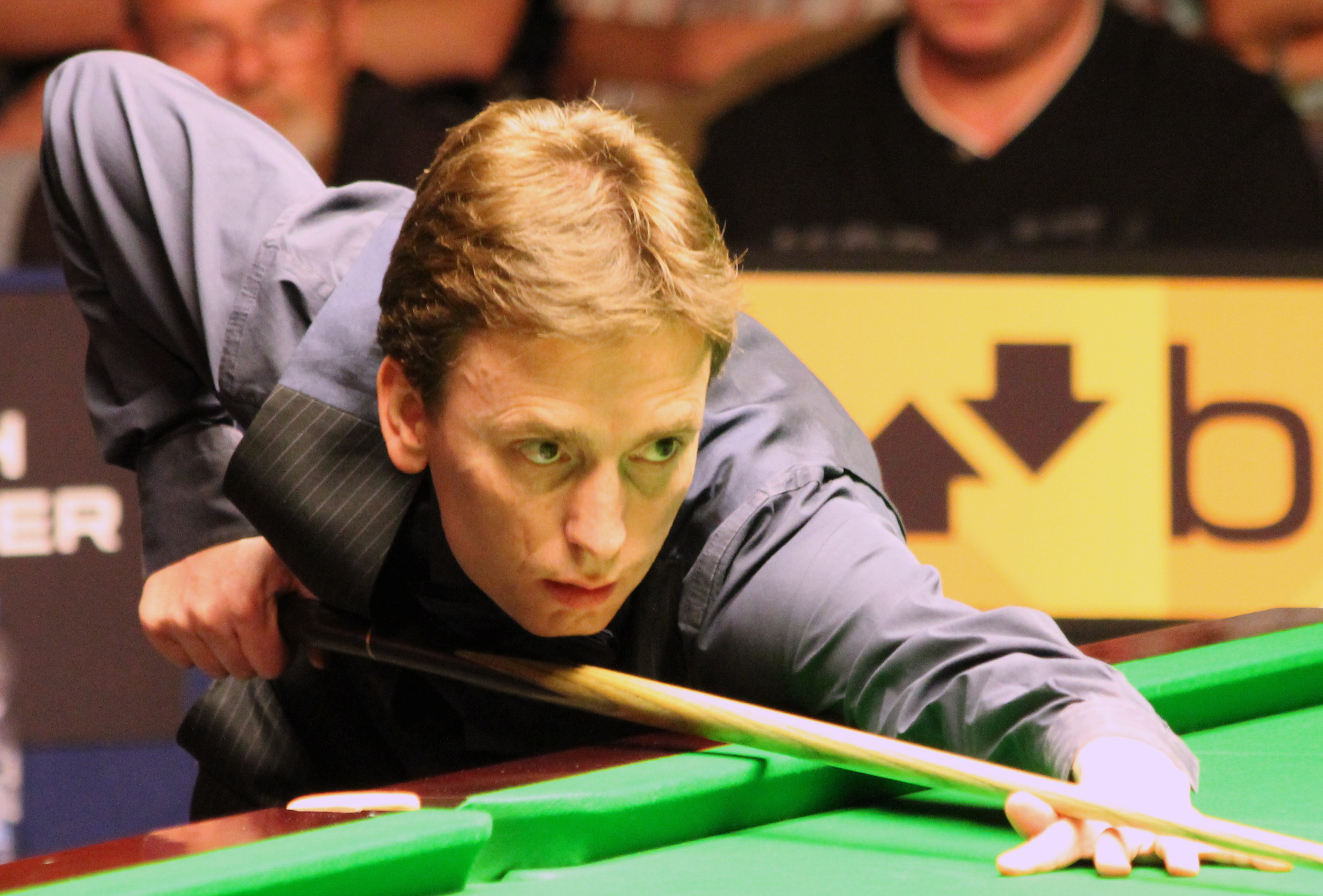
Ken Doherty (pictured in 2012) defeated Stephen Hendry 18–12 in the final to claim his first World Championship title. He became the first player from the Republic of Ireland and only the second player from outside the United Kingdom to win the title in the modern era.

Doherty won the opening frame, but Hendry followed with two century breaks to take the lead. Doherty then won four consecutive frames, making breaks including 69 and 59, before Hendry took the last of the session with a 122 break to trail 3–5. Hendry secured the first frame of the second session, but Doherty then won five in a row, making an 85 break in frame 14. The last two frames of the session were shared, giving Doherty an 11–5 overnight lead. "The centuries apart, it was a poor performance from Hendry who littered his game with errors," wrote Guy Hodgson, reporting for The Independent. "The champion missed chances that he would pot 999 times out of a thousand in practice." The third session was shared, with Hendry compiling breaks of 58, 92, and 137. Hendry produced breaks of 51 and 110 in the first two frames of the last session and also took the third to reduce his deficit to three frames at 12–15. Doherty then made breaks of 61 and 50 and also won frame 30 for an 18–12 victory. Doherty's victory brought to an end Hendry's five-year run as World Champion. It was Hendry's first defeat in the World Championship since the 1991 edition, also bringing to an end his record 29-match winning streak at the Crucible.

Doherty became the first player from the Republic of Ireland to win the World Championship and only the second player from outside the United Kingdom to claim the title in the modern era, following Cliff Thorburn in 1980. He also became the first player to win the IBSF World Under-21 Championship, the World Amateur Championship and the World Championship. Doherty, who earned £210,000 in prize money, climbed to third in the snooker world rankings. "It's marvellous for my family. They were all out here playing. They were potting every ball," he said. In Masters of the Baize, Luke Williams and Paul Gadsby wrote, "Doherty's life soon entered the surreal vortex of excitement and celebration common to all first-time Crucible winners. As the first world snooker champion from Ireland, his victory inspired a national party, with a quarter of a million people taking to the streets to welcome him home."

Hendry received £126,000 as runner-up. "Ken [Doherty] did the job, you can't take anything away from him. I thought I'd do the job when I got back to 15–12. Had I won the next frame, Ken would have been under a lot pressure. But the way I played in the second session was a recipe for disaster, my long potting wasn't all that good," Hendry said. "It's not disastrous, but it is disappointing. I'd swap the world title for the other events, but I'm No 1 in the world by a country mile and that's a consolation to take away. I've had a season that many other players would die for. I'm only 28. I'm not gone yet."

== Main draw ==
The draw for the main tournament is shown below. The numbers in parentheses after the players' names denote the seedings for the 16 seeded players. The match winners are shown in bold.

**First round** Best of 19 frames
19 April
**Stephen Hendry (SCO) (1)**	**10**
Andy Hicks (ENG)	6
19 & 20 April
**Mark Williams (WAL) (16)**	**10**
Terry Griffiths (WAL)	9
20 & 21 April
**Darren Morgan (WAL) (9)**	**10**
Gary Wilkinson (ENG)	5
20 & 21 April
**Ronnie O'Sullivan (ENG) (8)**	**10**
Mick Price (ENG)	6
22 April
Nigel Bond (ENG) (5)	8
**Stephen Lee (ENG)**	**10**
23 & 24 April
**James Wattana (THA) (12)**	**10**
Graeme Dott (SCO)	9
23 April
Jimmy White (ENG) (13)	9
**Anthony Hamilton (ENG)**	**10**
21 & 22 April
**John Parrott (ENG) (4)**	**10**
Bradley Jones (ENG)	9
19 & 20 April
Peter Ebdon (ENG) (3)	3
**Stefan Mazrocis (ENG)**	**10**
22 & 23 April
**Alain Robidoux (CAN) (14)**	**10**
Brian Morgan (ENG)	8
19 & 20 April
Dave Harold (ENG) (11)	7
**Lee Walker (WAL)**	**10**
21 & 22 April
**Alan McManus (SCO) (6)**	**10**
Billy Snaddon (SCO)	9
19 & 20 April
**Ken Doherty (IRL) (7)**	**10**
Mark Davis (ENG)	8
21 April
**Steve Davis (ENG) (10)**	**10**
David McLellan (SCO)	2
23 & 24 April
Tony Drago (MLT) (15)	9
**Dominic Dale (WAL)**	**10**
22 & 23 April
**John Higgins (SCO) (2)**	**10**
Graham Horne (SCO)	6

**Second round** Best of 25 frames
25 & 26 April
**Stephen Hendry (SCO) (1)**	**13**
Mark Williams (WAL) (16)	8
24, 25 & 26 April
**Darren Morgan (WAL) (9)**	**13**
Ronnie O'Sullivan (ENG) (8)	12
27 & 28 April
Stephen Lee (ENG)	7
**James Wattana (THA) (12)**	**13**
26, 27 & 28 April
Anthony Hamilton (ENG)	11
**John Parrott (ENG) (4)**	**13**
25 & 26 April
Stefan Mazrocis (ENG)	9
**Alain Robidoux (CAN) (14)**	**13**
24 & 25 April
**Lee Walker (WAL)**	**13**
Alan McManus (SCO) (6)	10
26, 27 & 28 April
**Ken Doherty (IRL) (7)**	**13**
Steve Davis (ENG) (10)	3
27 & 28 April
Dominic Dale (WAL)	5
**John Higgins (SCO) (2)**	**13**

**Quarter-finals**; Best of 25 frames
29 & 30 April
**Stephen Hendry (SCO) (1)**	**13**
Darren Morgan (WAL) (9)	10
29 & 30 April
**James Wattana (THA) (12)**	**13**
John Parrott (ENG) (4)	10
29 & 30 April
**Alain Robidoux (CAN) (14)**	**13**
Lee Walker (WAL)	8
29 & 30 April
**Ken Doherty (IRL) (7)**	**13**
John Higgins (SCO) (2)	9

**Semi-finals**; Best of 33 frames
1, 2 & 3 May
**Stephen Hendry (SCO) (1)**	**17**
James Wattana (THA) (12)	13
1, 2 & 3 May
Alain Robidoux (CAN) (14)	7
**Ken Doherty (IRL) (7)**	**17**

**Final**; Best of 35 frames
4 & 5 May
Stephen Hendry (SCO) (1)	12
**Ken Doherty (IRL) (7)**	**18**

=== Final: frame scores ===
Final: (Best of 35 frames) Crucible Theatre, Sheffield, 4 & 5 May 1997; Referee: Alan Chamberlain
Stephen Hendry (SCO) (1)				12–**18**			**Ken Doherty (IRL)** (7)			
Session 1: 3–5
Frame	1	2	3	4	5	6	7	8	9	10
Hendry	7	**117**^{†} (117)	**106**^{†} (106)	13	9	51	11	**122**^{†} (122)	N/A	N/A
Doherty	**67**^{†}	5	0	**77**^{†}	**78**^{†} (69)	**75**^{†}	**69**^{†}	0	N/A	N/A
Session 2: 2–6 (5–11)
Frame	1	2	3	4	5	6	7	8	9	10
Hendry	**76**^{†}	32	55	43	13	50 (50)	**74**^{†}	28	N/A	N/A
Doherty	12	**89**^{†}	**62**^{†}	**57**^{†}	**65**^{†}	**85**^{†} (85)	47	**60**^{†} (52)	N/A	N/A
Session 3: 4–4 (9–15)
Frame	1	2	3	4	5	6	7	8	9	10
Hendry	**70**^{†} (58)	24	**110**^{†} (92)	0	16	45	**137**^{†} (137)	**75**^{†}	N/A	N/A
Doherty	23	**71**^{†} (70)	4	**86**^{†}	**85**^{†} (52)	**59**^{†}	0	12	N/A	N/A
Session 4: 3–3 (12–**18**)
Frame	1	2	3	4	5	6	7	8	9	10
Hendry	**61**^{†} (51)	**114**^{†} (110)	**61**^{†}	23	19	49	N/A	N/A	N/A	N/A
Doherty	30	0	57	**82**^{†} (61)	**69**^{†} (50)	**71**^{†}	N/A	N/A	N/A	N/A
137				Highest break			85			
5				Century breaks			0			
9				50+ breaks			7			
Ken Doherty wins the 1997 World Snooker Championship; Breaks over 50 are shown in parentheses. † = Winner of frame

== Qualifying results ==
There were nine rounds in the qualifying competition. The first eight qualifying rounds took place at the Norbreck Hotel, Blackpool, from 3 to 24 January 1997. The final qualifying round was played at Telford International Centre from 24 to 26 March. The first four rounds were played as the best of 9 frames, and the other rounds were the best of 19 frames.

=== Rounds 1–5 ===
Results for rounds 1 to 5 are shown below.

First qualifying round Best of 9 frames
William Milton (IRL)	5
John Leahy (IRL)	2
Andy Lavin (ENG)	5
Alan Brookes (ENG)	0
Michael Rhodes (ENG)	5
Mohammed Rangzib (ENG)	2
Udesh Pillay (ENG)	5
Arvinder Batth (ENG)	3
Jon Wibberley (ENG)	5
Steven Gibbs (ENG)	3
Johl Younger (AUS)	5
Graham Francis (ENG)	0
Mohammed Shehab (UAE)	5
David Manley (WAL)	2
Brian Cox (ENG)	w/o
Michael Kirkham (ENG)	w/d
James Tatton (ENG)	5
John Wade (ENG)	1
Ali Carter (ENG)	5
Charlie Economou (CYP)	0
Daniel Smith (ENG)	5
Matthew Street (ENG)	2
Alex Lambie (SCO)	w/o
Richard McHugh (IRL)	w/d
Barry Hawkins (ENG)	5
Huseyin Hursid (TUR)	0
John Wilson (ENG)	5
Neil Smitham (ENG)	4
Alan Burnett (SCO)	5
Stephen Tierney (SCO)	2
Danny Lathouwers (BEL)	5
John Daniels (ENG)	2
Peter Holland (ENG)	5
Karen Corr (NIR)	2
Tim Price (ENG)	5
Abdul Allie (RSA)	2
Paul Stockwell (ENG)	5
Dane Hall (ENG)	1
Mark Tucker (WAL)	5
Ali Bassiri (ENG)	1
David Gray (ENG)	5
Nick Manning (ENG)	4
Norman MacLachlan (SCO)	5
Danny Auld (ENG)	1
Mohammed Al Joker (UAE)	w/o
Daryl Wouters (CAN)	w/d
David Craggs (ENG)	5
Jimmy O'Shea (ENG)	4
Kyndon Paddon (ENG)	5
James Reynolds (WAL)	2
Allan Williams (SCO)	5
Ewan Hunter (SCO)	3
Mark Cackett (ENG)	5
Malcolm Bilclough (ENG)	4
Grant Conquest (ENG)	5
Majed Basheer (ENG)	3
Michael Holt (ENG)	5
Michael Speight (ENG)	4
Marc Farnsworth (ENG)	5
Andrew Higginson (ENG)	4
Avtar Sohanpal (ENG)	5
Wayne Stannard (ENG)	2
Richard Tatton (ENG)	5
Paul Clutton (ENG)	0
Stephen Delaney (ENG)	5
Ian Glover (ENG)	2
Justin Smalley (ENG)	5
Anthony Massey (ENG)	1
Wayne Ellison (ENG)	5
Simon Keeton (ENG)	1
Steven McMillan (ENG)	w/o
Stuart Hinton (ENG)	w/d
Karl Beare (ENG)	5
Stephen Pieroni (ENG)	1
Craig Roper (ENG)	5
Shaun Wilkes (ENG)	2
Spencer Donnelly (SCO)	5
Costas Kassinides (CYP)	0
Mark Carrington (ENG)	5
Harinder Singh (ENG)	1
Barry McNamee (IRL)	w/o
Guo Hua (CHN)	w/d

Second qualifying round Best of 9 frames
Lee Walters (ENG)	0
William Milton (IRL)	5
David Mole (ENG)	1
Andy Lavin (ENG)	5
Del Smith (ENG)	0
Michael Rhodes (ENG)	5
Andrew Milliard (ENG)	5
Udesh Pillay (ENG)	1
Indika Dodangoda (LKA)	4
Jon Wibberley (ENG)	5
Matthew Bray (ENG)	3
Johl Younger (AUS)	5
Iain Trimble (ENG)	5
Mohammed Shehab (UAE)	1
Darren Swinburn (ENG)	5
Brian Cox (ENG)	3
Eddie Barker (ENG)	0
James Tatton (ENG)	5
Elliott Clark (ENG)	0
Ali Carter (ENG)	5
Graham Stevens (ENG)	5
Daniel Smith (ENG)	3
Gary Thomson (SCO)	5
Alex Lambie (SCO)	0
Garoid O'Connor (ENG)	5
Richard Alford (ENG)	0
Andrew Hall (ENG)	5
Lee Mallen (ENG)	1
Tony Kenny (ENG)	5
Andreas Ahmed (ENG)	2
Andrew Alexandrou (ENG)	3
Barry Hawkins (ENG)	5
Robert Harrhy (WAL)	5
John Wilson (ENG)	1
John Whitty (ENG)	3
Alan Burnett (SCO)	5
Alfonso Bellusci (ENG)	4
Danny Lathouwers (BEL)	5
Nicholas Segal (ENG)	w/d
Peter Holland (ENG)	w/o
Robert Grenville-Smith (ENG)	1
Tim Price (ENG)	5
Munier Cassim (RSA)	1
Paul Stockwell (ENG)	5
Stuart Mann (ENG)	5
Mark Tucker (WAL)	3
Jack Fitzmaurice (ENG)	1
David Gray (ENG)	5
Stephen Ormerod (ENG)	5
Norman MacLachlan (SCO)	1
Jason Greaves (ENG)	5
Mohammed Al Joker (UAE)	1
Richard Somauroo (ENG)	1
David Craggs (ENG)	5
Gareth Atkins (ENG)	4
Kyndon Paddon (ENG)	5
Evan Munro (SCO)	5
Allan Williams (SCO)	2
Christopher McGee (ENG)	5
Mark Cackett (ENG)	3
David Athorn (ENG)	2
Grant Conquest (ENG)	5
Andrew Photiou (ENG)	4
Michael Holt (ENG)	5
Lee Johnson (ENG)	5
Julian Mills (ENG)	3
Mark Ganderton (ENG)	5
Juan Rosales (CHL)	3
Nick Spelman (ENG)	5
Dean Richardson (ENG)	2
Neil Selman (ENG)	5
Andrew Highfield (ENG)	1
Stuart Bingham (ENG)	5
Eddie Glass (ENG)	4
Mark Love (ENG)	5
Johan Oenema (NED)	4
Carl Stringer (ENG)	w/o
Vipul Patel (ENG)	w/d
Karl Townsend (ENG)	5
Jamie Moreland (ENG)	4
Colin Donaldson (SCO)	2
Marc Farnsworth (ENG)	5
Steve Day (ENG)	5
Avtar Sohanpal (ENG)	4
Darren Paris (SUI)	1
Richard Tatton (ENG)	5
Kevin Smith (ENG)	5
Stephen Delaney (ENG)	3
Richard Culham (ENG)	5
Gary Clarke (ENG)	0
John Dunning (ENG)	5
Anthony Bridge (ENG)	0
Andrew Grieve (ENG)	5
Jimmy Singh (ENG)	3
Stephen Waldron (ENG)	5
Sanjay Meghani (ENG)	1
John Mills (WAL)	5
Richard Jones (WAL)	4
Richard Batty (ENG)	5
Mark Weston (ENG)	0
Myles Deleuse (ENG)	w/o
Paul Lovegrove (ENG)	w/d
Simon Bedford (ENG)	5
Tony Brown (ENG)	3
Paul Clarke (ENG)	1
Justin Smalley (ENG)	5
Sefton Payne (ENG)	5
Wayne Ellison (ENG)	0
Jason Dunworth (ENG)	w/d
Steven McMillan (ENG)	w/o
Mario Wehrmann (NED)	3
Karl Beare (ENG)	5
Simon Smith (ENG)	5
Mike Nixon (ENG)	4
Neil Gilder (ENG)	5
Paul Fung (HKG)	1
Jason Curtis (ENG)	5
Richard King (ENG)	4
Ahmed Osman (BEL)	5
Paul Radin (ENG)	1
Paul Dawson (ENG)	3
Craig Roper (ENG)	5
Mark Whatley (ENG)	1
Spencer Donnelly (SCO)	5
Barry Mapstone (ENG)	5
Mark Carrington (ENG)	2
Munraj Pal (ENG)	5
Barry McNamee (IRL)	4

Third qualifying round Best of 9 frames
Steve Ventham (ENG)	4
William Milton (IRL)	5
Steve Whalley (ENG)	5
Andy Lavin (ENG)	3
Steve Harrison (ENG)	2
Michael Rhodes (ENG)	5
Anthony O'Connor (IRL)	2
Andrew Milliard (ENG)	5
Graham Fisken (ENG)	5
Jon Wibberley (ENG)	3
Declan Hughes (NIR)	2
Johl Younger (AUS)	5
Bjorn Haneveer (BEL)	5
Iain Trimble (ENG)	1
Ian Hurdman (ENG)	5
Darren Swinburn (ENG)	2
Michael O'Sullivan (ENG)	5
James Tatton (ENG)	4
Robert Milkins (ENG)	5
Ali Carter (ENG)	3
Will Jerram (ENG)	2
Graham Stevens (ENG)	5
Shaun Mellish (ENG)	4
Gary Thomson (SCO)	5
Craig Bradshaw (ENG)	3
Garoid O'Connor (ENG)	5
Mario Geudens (BEL)	5
Andrew Hall (ENG)	2
Steve Elliott (ENG)	5
Tony Kenny (ENG)	1
Adrian Gunnell (ENG)	3
Barry Hawkins (ENG)	5
Andy Neck (ENG)	5
Robert Harrhy (WAL)	2
Andrew Radford (ENG)	1
Alan Burnett (SCO)	5
Leo Fernandez (IRL)	5
Danny Lathouwers (BEL)	2
Mark Williams (ENG)	4
Peter Holland (ENG)	5
Geoff Dunn (SCO)	5
Tim Price (ENG)	4
Lee Grant (ENG)	4
Paul Stockwell (ENG)	5
Mukesh Parmar (ENG)	3
Stuart Mann (ENG)	5
Richard Wheelhouse (ENG)	1
David Gray (ENG)	5
Matthew McGrotty (ENG)	5
Stephen Ormerod (ENG)	2
James Vicarey (ENG)	2
Jason Greaves (ENG)	5
Dean Venables (ENG)	1
David Craggs (ENG)	5
Darren Limburg (ENG)	5
Kyndon Paddon (ENG)	3
Ryan Michael (ENG)	1
Evan Munro (SCO)	5
Damian Massey (ENG)	4
Christopher McGee (ENG)	5
Jonathan Bagley (ENG)	5
Grant Conquest (ENG)	2
Stephen Kershaw (ENG)	3
Michael Holt (ENG)	5
Raymon Fabrie (NED)	5
Lee Johnson (ENG)	4
Scott Rigg (ENG)	5
Mark Ganderton (ENG)	1
Dermot McGlinchey (NIR)	5
Nick Spelman (ENG)	3
Daniele Zagaroli (ITA)	3
Neil Selman (ENG)	5
Iwan Jones (WAL)	3
Stuart Bingham (ENG)	5
Ian Bullimore (ENG)	2
Mark Love (ENG)	5
Eddie Manning (ENG)	3
Carl Stringer (ENG)	5
Andrew Peters (WAL)	0
Karl Townsend (ENG)	5
David Singh (IND)	0
Marc Farnsworth (ENG)	5
Neil Wood (ENG)	2
Steve Day (ENG)	5
Brett Patmore (ENG)	4
Richard Tatton (ENG)	5
Wayne Saidler (ENG)	2
Kevin Smith (ENG)	5
Mark Miller (ENG)	2
Richard Culham (ENG)	5
Philip Seaton (ENG)	5
John Dunning (ENG)	2
John Burns (ENG)	3
Andrew Grieve (ENG)	5
Gary Irvine (NIR)	w/d
Stephen Waldron (ENG)	w/o
Wayne Lloyd (WAL)	5
John Mills (WAL)	3
Quinten Hann (AUS)	5
Richard Batty (ENG)	0
Scott Cooney (ENG)	5
Myles Deleuse (ENG)	4
Neal Jones (ENG)	1
Simon Bedford (ENG)	5
John Herbert (WAL)	5
Justin Smalley (ENG)	2
Steve Russell (ENG)	4
Sefton Payne (ENG)	5
Michael Leach (ENG)	5
Steven McMillan (ENG)	0
Hugh Abernethy (SCO)	5
Karl Beare (ENG)	2
Matt Bailey (ENG)	5
Simon Smith (ENG)	3
Neil Tomkins (WAL)	5
Neil Gilder (ENG)	3
Darren Shaw (ENG)	3
Jason Curtis (ENG)	5
Justin Buckingham (ENG)	5
Ahmed Osman (BEL)	1
Chris Barnard (ENG)	5
Craig Roper (ENG)	0
Stephen Popplewell (ENG)	0
Spencer Donnelly (SCO)	5
Andrew Hannah (ENG)	2
Barry Mapstone (ENG)	5
Colm Gilcreest (IRL)	4
Munraj Pal (ENG)	5

Fourth qualifying round Best of 9 frames
Barry West (ENG)	5
William Milton (IRL)	2
Stuart Parnell (ENG)	5
Steve Whalley (ENG)	2
David Coles (ENG)	0
Michael Rhodes (ENG)	5
Craig MacGillivray (SCO)	5
Andrew Milliard (ENG)	0
Mehmet Husnu (CYP)	4
Graham Fisken (ENG)	5
Steve Archer (ENG)	4
Johl Younger (AUS)	5
Ian Sargeant (WAL)	3
Bjorn Haneveer (BEL)	5
Alfie Burden (ENG)	5
Ian Hurdman (ENG)	0
Tai Pichit (THA)	5
Michael O'Sullivan (ENG)	1
Sam Chong (MYS)	3
Robert Milkins (ENG)	5
Anthony Harris (ENG)	2
Graham Stevens (ENG)	5
Gareth Chilcott (WAL)	5
Gary Thomson (SCO)	3
Steve Meakin (ENG)	2
Garoid O'Connor (ENG)	5
Steve Prest (ENG)	2
Mario Geudens (BEL)	5
Jim Chambers (ENG)	5
Steve Elliott (ENG)	3
Martin O'Neill (NIR)	5
Barry Hawkins (ENG)	3
Philip Williams (WAL)	1
Andy Neck (ENG)	5
Michael Duffy (NIR)	2
Alan Burnett (SCO)	5
Patrick Delsemme (BEL)	2
Leo Fernandez (IRL)	5
Joe Delaney (IRL)	5
Peter Holland (ENG)	2
Mark Gray (ENG)	1
Geoff Dunn (SCO)	5
Leigh Griffin (ENG)	5
Paul Stockwell (ENG)	1
Scott Bigham (SCO)	3
Stuart Mann (ENG)	5
Darren Hackeson (ENG)	2
David Gray (ENG)	5
John Bayliss (ENG)	5
Matthew McGrotty (ENG)	3
Robert Foxall (ENG)	5
Jason Greaves (ENG)	3
Peter McCullagh (ENG)	1
David Craggs (ENG)	5
Anton Bishop (ENG)	1
Darren Limburg (ENG)	5
Patrick Wallace (NIR)	5
Evan Munro (SCO)	2
Bradley Jones (ENG)	5
Christopher McGee (ENG)	0
Alex Borg (MLT)	5
Jonathan Bagley (ENG)	2
Joe O'Boye (IRL)	1
Michael Holt (ENG)	5
David McDonnell (IRL)	5
Raymon Fabrie (NED)	4
Paul Davison (ENG)	3
Scott Rigg (ENG)	5
Richy McDonald (SCO)	w/d
Dermot McGlinchey (NIR)	w/o
Stephen Taylor (ENG)	5
Neil Selman (ENG)	2
Garry Baldrey (ENG)	4
Stuart Bingham (ENG)	5
Mike Dunn (ENG)	5
Mark Love (ENG)	2
Gary Lees (ENG)	5
Carl Stringer (ENG)	4
Pat Horne (ENG)	5
Karl Townsend (ENG)	2
Lee Walker (WAL)	5
Marc Farnsworth (ENG)	4
Murdo MacLeod (SCO)	1
Steve Day (ENG)	5
Micky Roughan (IRL)	2
Richard Tatton (ENG)	5
Alistair Fleming (SCO)	5
Kevin Smith (ENG)	2
David Taylor (ENG)	2
Richard Culham (ENG)	5
Robby Foldvari (AUS)	4
Philip Seaton (ENG)	5
Paul S. Davison (ENG)	5
Andrew Grieve (ENG)	0
Simon Parker (ENG)	5
Stephen Waldron (ENG)	0
Troy Shaw (ENG)	5
Wayne Lloyd (WAL)	0
Mark Fenton (WAL)	5
Quinten Hann (AUS)	4
Leigh Robinson (ENG)	5
Scott Cooney (ENG)	4
Suriya Suwannasingh (THA)	w/d
Simon Bedford (ENG)	w/o
Neil Mosley (ENG)	5
John Herbert (WAL)	3
Joe Jogia (ENG)	5
Sefton Payne (ENG)	2
John Lardner (SCO)	5
Michael Leach (ENG)	4
Jason Pegram (ENG)	4
Hugh Abernethy (SCO)	5
Eugene Hughes (IRL)	4
Matt Bailey (ENG)	5
Shane Haines (ENG)	2
Neil Tomkins (WAL)	5
Mark O'Sullivan (IRL)	4
Jason Curtis (ENG)	5
Simon Morris (ENG)	5
Justin Buckingham (ENG)	1
Paul Sweeny (ENG)	5
Chris Barnard (ENG)	1
Craig Harrison (ENG)	5
Spencer Donnelly (SCO)	2
Chris Shade (SCO)	4
Barry Mapstone (ENG)	5
Joe Perry (ENG)	5
Munraj Pal (ENG)	1

Fifth qualifying round Best of 19 frames
Matthew Stevens (WAL)	10
Barry West (ENG)	3
Jeff Cundy (ENG)	9
Stuart Parnell (ENG)	10
Paul Wykes (ENG)	1
Michael Rhodes (ENG)	10
Ian McCulloch (ENG)	10
Craig MacGillivray (SCO)	3
Surinder Gill (ENG)	10
Graham Fisken (ENG)	4
Barry Pinches (ENG)	10
Johl Younger (AUS)	5
Sean Storey (ENG)	10
Bjorn Haneveer (BEL)	5
Stuart Pettman (ENG)	8
Alfie Burden (ENG)	10
Robin Hull (FIN)	8
Tai Pichit (THA)	10
Karl Burrows (ENG)	7
Robert Milkins (ENG)	10
Michael Judge (IRL)	10
Graham Stevens (ENG)	1
Sean Lanigan (ENG)	8
Gareth Chilcott (WAL)	10
Paul Hunter (ENG)	10
Garoid O'Connor (ENG)	6
Jamie Woodman (ENG)	6
Mario Geudens (BEL)	10
Antony Bolsover (ENG)	10
Jim Chambers (ENG)	7
Mark Rowing (ENG)	8
Martin O'Neill (NIR)	10
Shokat Ali (PAK)	10
Andy Neck (ENG)	2
Paul Cavney (ENG)	6
Alan Burnett (SCO)	10
Wayne Brown (ENG)	10
Leo Fernandez (IRL)	2
Gerard Greene (NIR)	10
Joe Delaney (IRL)	6
Paul McPhillips (SCO)	5
Geoff Dunn (SCO)	10
Nick Fruin (ENG)	7
Leigh Griffin (ENG)	10
Steve Newbury (WAL)	3
Stuart Mann (ENG)	10
Nick Walker (ENG)	10
David Gray (ENG)	3
John Read (ENG)	10
John Bayliss (ENG)	4
Stuart Reardon (ENG)	9
Robert Foxall (ENG)	10
Stephen O'Connor (IRL)	10
David Craggs (ENG)	2
Alex Higgins (NIR)	9
Darren Limburg (ENG)	10
Matthew Couch (ENG)	10
Patrick Wallace (NIR)	6
John Giles (ENG)	6
Bradley Jones (ENG)	10
Andrew Cairns (ENG)	10
Alex Borg (MLT)	2
Adrian Rosa (ENG)	7
Michael Holt (ENG)	10
Jason Wallace (ENG)	10
David McDonnell (IRL)	7
Stefan Mazrocis (ENG)	10
Scott Rigg (ENG)	9
Jason Weston (ENG)	10
Dermot McGlinchey (NIR)	2
Yasin Merchant (IND)	10
Stephen Taylor (ENG)	2
Matt Wilson (ENG)	9
Stuart Bingham (ENG)	10
Noppadon Noppachorn (THA)	10
Mike Dunn (ENG)	4
Nick Pearce (ENG)	10
Gary Lees (ENG)	5
Steve Judd (ENG)	10
Pat Horne (ENG)	3
Danny Fowler (ENG)	4
Lee Walker (WAL)	10
Gary Ponting (ENG)	10
Steve Day (ENG)	8
Les Dodd (ENG)	5
Richard Tatton (ENG)	10
Chris Scanlon (ENG)	10
Alistair Fleming (SCO)	5
Martin Dziewialtowski (SCO)	10
Richard Culham (ENG)	4
Lee Richardson (ENG)	10
Philip Seaton (ENG)	2
Colin Morton (ENG)	4
Paul S. Davison (ENG)	10
Nigel Gilbert (ENG)	10
Simon Parker (ENG)	6
Darryn Walker (ENG)	10
Troy Shaw (ENG)	7
Oliver King (ENG)	10
Mark Fenton (WAL)	7
Ken Owers (ENG)	5
Leigh Robinson (ENG)	10
Darren Clarke (ENG)	10
Simon Bedford (ENG)	8
Peter Lines (ENG)	10
Neil Mosley (ENG)	4
David McLellan (SCO)	10
Joe Jogia (ENG)	9
Nick Dyson (ENG)	10
John Lardner (SCO)	8
Joe Grech (MLT)	5
Hugh Abernethy (SCO)	10
Brian Rowswell (ENG)	10
Matt Bailey (ENG)	6
Dominic Dale (WAL)	10
Neil Tomkins (WAL)	7
Dylan Leary (NIR)	10
Jason Curtis (ENG)	3
Ian Brumby (ENG)	10
Simon Morris (ENG)	4
Silvino Francisco (RSA)	6
Paul Sweeny (ENG)	10
Marcus Campbell (SCO)	10
Craig Harrison (ENG)	2
Graham Horne (SCO)	10
Barry Mapstone (ENG)	5
Tony Meo (ENG)	2
Joe Perry (ENG)	10

Note: w/o = walkover; w/d = withdrawn

=== Rounds 6–9 ===
Results for rounds 6 to 9 are shown below.

Sixth qualifying round Best of 19 frames
Matthew Stevens (WAL)	10
Stuart Parnell (ENG)	1
Michael Rhodes (ENG)	9
Ian McCulloch (ENG)	10
Surinder Gill (ENG)	5
Barry Pinches (ENG)	10
Sean Storey (ENG)	7
Alfie Burden (ENG)	10
Tai Pichit (THA)	10
Robert Milkins (ENG)	9
Michael Judge (IRL)	10
Gareth Chilcott (WAL)	3
Paul Hunter (ENG)	10
Mario Geudens (BEL)	7
Antony Bolsover (ENG)	10
Martin O'Neill (NIR)	5
Shokat Ali (PAK)	8
Alan Burnett (SCO)	10
Wayne Brown (ENG)	10
Gerard Greene (NIR)	8
Geoff Dunn (SCO)	10
Leigh Griffin (ENG)	6
Stuart Mann (ENG)	10
Nick Walker (ENG)	5
John Read (ENG)	10
Robert Foxall (ENG)	8
Stephen O'Connor (IRL)	10
Darren Limburg (ENG)	3
Matthew Couch (ENG)	7
Bradley Jones (ENG)	10
Andrew Cairns (ENG)	9
Michael Holt (ENG)	10
Jason Wallace (ENG)	7
Stefan Mazrocis (ENG)	10
Jason Weston (ENG)	10
Yasin Merchant (IND)	3
Stuart Bingham (ENG)	10
Noppadon Noppachorn (THA)	6
Nick Pearce (ENG)	10
Steve Judd (ENG)	7
Lee Walker (WAL)	10
Gary Ponting (ENG)	5
Richard Tatton (ENG)	5
Chris Scanlon (ENG)	10
Martin Dziewialtowski (SCO)	5
Lee Richardson (ENG)	10
Paul S. Davison (ENG)	10
Nigel Gilbert (ENG)	9
Darryn Walker (ENG)	10
Oliver King (ENG)	6
Leigh Robinson (ENG)	2
Darren Clarke (ENG)	10
Peter Lines (ENG)	9
David McLellan (SCO)	10
Nick Dyson (ENG)	10
Hugh Abernethy (SCO)	1
Brian Rowswell (ENG)	6
Dominic Dale (WAL)	10
Dylan Leary (NIR)	10
Ian Brumby (ENG)	8
Paul Sweeny (ENG)	10
Marcus Campbell (SCO)	7
Graham Horne (SCO)	10
Joe Perry (ENG)	8

Seventh qualifying round Best of 19 frames
Martin Clark (ENG)	7
Matthew Stevens (WAL)	10
Jason Prince (NIR)	10
Ian McCulloch (ENG)	8
Tony Knowles (ENG)	6
Barry Pinches (ENG)	10
Mark Bennett (WAL)	3
Alfie Burden (ENG)	10
Anthony Davies (WAL)	10
Tai Pichit (THA)	4
David Roe (ENG)	9
Michael Judge (IRL)	10
Jimmy Michie (ENG)	10
Paul Hunter (ENG)	7
Paul Davies (WAL)	10
Antony Bolsover (ENG)	8
Doug Mountjoy (WAL)	1
Alan Burnett (SCO)	10
Drew Henry (SCO)	10
Wayne Brown (ENG)	5
Wayne Jones (WAL)	6
Geoff Dunn (SCO)	10
Graeme Dott (SCO)	10
Stuart Mann (ENG)	5
Fergal O'Brien (IRL)	w/o
John Read (ENG)	w/d
Karl Broughton (ENG)	10
Stephen O'Connor (IRL)	3
Nick Terry (ENG)	5
Bradley Jones (ENG)	10
Jamie Burnett (SCO)	10
Michael Holt (ENG)	5
Karl Payne (ENG)	8
Stefan Mazrocis (ENG)	10
Stephen Murphy (IRL)	4
Jason Weston (ENG)	10
Brian Morgan (ENG)	10
Stuart Bingham (ENG)	5
Mark Flowerdew (ENG)	5
Nick Pearce (ENG)	10
Joe Johnson (ENG)	4
Lee Walker (WAL)	10
Euan Henderson (SCO)	10
Chris Scanlon (ENG)	3
Billy Snaddon (SCO)	10
Lee Richardson (ENG)	8
Mark Johnston-Allen (ENG)	5
Paul S. Davison (ENG)	10
Terry Murphy (NIR)	10
Darryn Walker (ENG)	3
Mark Davis (ENG)	10
Darren Clarke (ENG)	0
Tony Jones (ENG)	9
David McLellan (SCO)	10
Mike Hallett (ENG)	5
Nick Dyson (ENG)	10
Dean Reynolds (ENG)	9
Dominic Dale (WAL)	10
Jonathan Birch (ENG)	10
Dylan Leary (NIR)	5
Mark King (ENG)	10
Paul Sweeny (ENG)	6
Tony Chappel (WAL)	6
Graham Horne (SCO)	10

Eighth qualifying round Best of 19 frames
Matthew Stevens (WAL)	10
Jason Prince (NIR)	7
Barry Pinches (ENG)	6
Alfie Burden (ENG)	10
Anthony Davies (WAL)	5
Michael Judge (IRL)	10
Jimmy Michie (ENG)	10
Paul Davies (WAL)	9
Alan Burnett (SCO)	3
Drew Henry (SCO)	10
Geoff Dunn (SCO)	7
Graeme Dott (SCO)	10
Fergal O'Brien (IRL)	5
Karl Broughton (ENG)	10
Bradley Jones (ENG)	10
Jamie Burnett (SCO)	9
Stefan Mazrocis (ENG)	10
Jason Weston (ENG)	9
Brian Morgan (ENG)	10
Nick Pearce (ENG)	7
Lee Walker (WAL)	10
Euan Henderson (SCO)	8
Billy Snaddon (SCO)	10
Paul S. Davison (ENG)	3
Terry Murphy (NIR)	6
Mark Davis (ENG)	10
David McLellan (SCO)	10
Nick Dyson (ENG)	6
Dominic Dale (WAL)	10
Jonathan Birch (ENG)	3
Mark King (ENG)	6
Graham Horne (SCO)	10

Ninth qualifying round Best of 19 frames
Andy Hicks (ENG)	10
Matthew Stevens (WAL)	7
Terry Griffiths (WAL)	10
Alfie Burden (ENG)	4
Gary Wilkinson (ENG)	10
Michael Judge (IRL)	9
Mick Price (ENG)	10
Jimmy Michie (ENG)	9
Stephen Lee (ENG)	10
Drew Henry (SCO)	5
Joe Swail (NIR)	8
Graeme Dott (SCO)	10
Anthony Hamilton (ENG)	10
Karl Broughton (ENG)	5
David Finbow (ENG)	4
Bradley Jones (ENG)	10
Chris Small (SCO)	4
Stefan Mazrocis (ENG)	10
Dene O'Kane (NZL)	6
Brian Morgan (ENG)	10
Dennis Taylor (NIR)	7
Lee Walker (WAL)	10
Rod Lawler (ENG)	7
Billy Snaddon (SCO)	10
Jason Ferguson (ENG)	5
Mark Davis (ENG)	10
Neal Foulds (ENG)	9
David McLellan (SCO)	10
Willie Thorne (ENG)	6
Dominic Dale (WAL)	10
Steve James (ENG)	7
Graham Horne (SCO)	10

== Century breaks ==
A total of 39 century breaks were made during the main stage of the tournament. The highest was a maximum by Ronnie O'Sullivan.

- 147, 133 – Ronnie O'Sullivan
- 137, 122, 117, 114, 110, 106, 106, 101, 101 – Stephen Hendry
- 134, 130, 111, 101 – John Higgins
- 133, 129, 129, 102 – John Parrott
- 131 – Billy Snaddon
- 129, 121, 117 – Anthony Hamilton
- 128, 121, 116, 108 – Darren Morgan
- 127 – Stefan Mazrocis
- 125 – Jimmy White
- 123 – Mark Williams
- 121, 113 – Alain Robidoux
- 116, 104, 101 – Ken Doherty
- 112 – James Wattana
- 110 – Dominic Dale
- 100 – Stephen Lee
- 100 – Alan McManus
